= Hao (gamer) =

Chinese former professional Dota 2 player

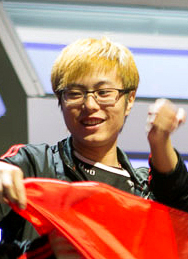
- Chen after winning The International 4

Personal information
- Name: Chen Zhihao
- Nationality: Chinese

Career information
- Games: Dota; Dota 2

Team history
- 2009–2010: xFy
- 2011: TyLoo
- 2011–2012: PanDarea Gaming
- 2012–2013: TongFu
- 2013–2014: Invictus Gaming
- 2014–2015: Newbee
- 2015: Vici Gaming
- 2015–2016: Newbee

Career highlights and awards
- The International champion (2014)

Chen Zhihao (born July 28, 1990) (Chinese: 陈智豪), better known simply as Hao, is a Chinese former professional Dota 2 player, best known for winning The International 2014 with Newbee. He is known to have been active among the Dota 2 community from 2011-2018. He was part of the Newbee eSports Club team that won the single largest money prize in video game history, a US$5,028,308 payout He joined Vici Gaming in 2015. Vici finished fourth at The International 2015. On August 31, 2015, it was reported that Hao would be returning to Newbee.

== Trivia ==
There is a nickname for Hao among the Chinese Dota players, "Hao the Hand Cutter (砍手豪)", because of the words he said when he faced RoX.KIS in 2010: "Pick Spectre for me, I will cut off my hand if we're not the winner." He is also known for spamming Spectre during the Anti-Mage craze.

== Biography ==
Chen 'Hao' Zhihao, nicknamed General Hao by the Chinese community, is known to be one of the most aggressive players in the scene. Having joined teams such as Nirvana.cn, TyLoo, Pandarea, TongFu, Invictus Gaming, Newbee, and Vici Gaming, Hao is no stranger to LAN competitions and is also known to be extremely fervent during matches. As a carry player, he has the urge to kill which can be seen in games where he dives countless times for kills. His risky plays defines his character, and the polarizing rewards or setbacks from the outcome of his aggression can make or break the team that he plays in.

Hao has played in nearly every International, in 2011 with TyLoo (Placed 9-12th), in 2012 (Placed 7-8th) and 2013 with TongFu (Placed 4th), in 2014 with Newbee (Placed 1st), and in 2015 with Vici Gaming (Placed 4th).

== Tournament placings ==
=== Defense of the Ancients ===
Team	Date	Placing	Event
XFy	2009-12-01	1st	Alienware Dota League 2009
TyLoo	2011-08-09	3rd	CPL Invitational 2011 (DotA)
PanDarea Gaming	2011-11-13	2nd	World DotA Championship 2011
TongFu	2012-09-14	2nd	ACE Dota Pro-league 2012 Season 1
TongFu	2012-12-02	1st	World Cyber Games 2012

=== Dota 2 ===
Team	Date	Placing	Event
TongFu	2012-09-02	7th	The International 2012
TongFu	2013-05-15	1st	AMD Premier League Season 1
TongFu	2013-07-06	1st	Dota 2 Super League
TongFu	2013-08-11	4th	The International 2013
NewBee	2014-05-25	1st	MarsTV Dota 2 League 2014
NewBee	2014-07-21	1st	The International 2014
NewBee	2014-09-26	5 - 8th	i-league
NewBee	2014-10-05	1st	World Cyber Arena 2014
NewBee	2014-11-16	1st	E-Sports World Championship 2014
NewBee	2014-12-07	1st	National Electronic Sports Open 2014
NewBee	2014-12-30	1st	ECL 2014 Autumn
Vici Gaming	2015-04-26	1st	Star Ladder StarSeries Season XII
Vici Gaming	2015-08-07	4th	The International 2015
Newbee	2015-11-16	13th-16th	Frankfurt Major 2015
Newbee	2015-12-18	13th-16th	World Cyber Arena 2015
Newbee	2016-01-30	5th-6th	MarsTV Dota 2 League Winter 2015
Newbee	2016-03-03	9th-12th	Shanghai Major 2016
Newbee	2016-05-15	2nd	EPICENTER
Newbee	2016-06-12	3rd	Manila Major 2016
Newbee	2016-07-10	1st	Nanyang Dota 2 Championships Season 2
Newbee	2016-08-02	9th-12th	The International 2016

Preceded by Alliance (Na'Vi)	The International winner 2014; With: NewBee; Zhang "Mu" Pan; Zhang "xiao8" Ning; Wang "Banana" Jiao; Wang "SanSheng" Zhaohui	Succeeded by Evil Geniuses
