= BurNIng =

Chinese esports player (born c. 1987)

Xu Zhilei
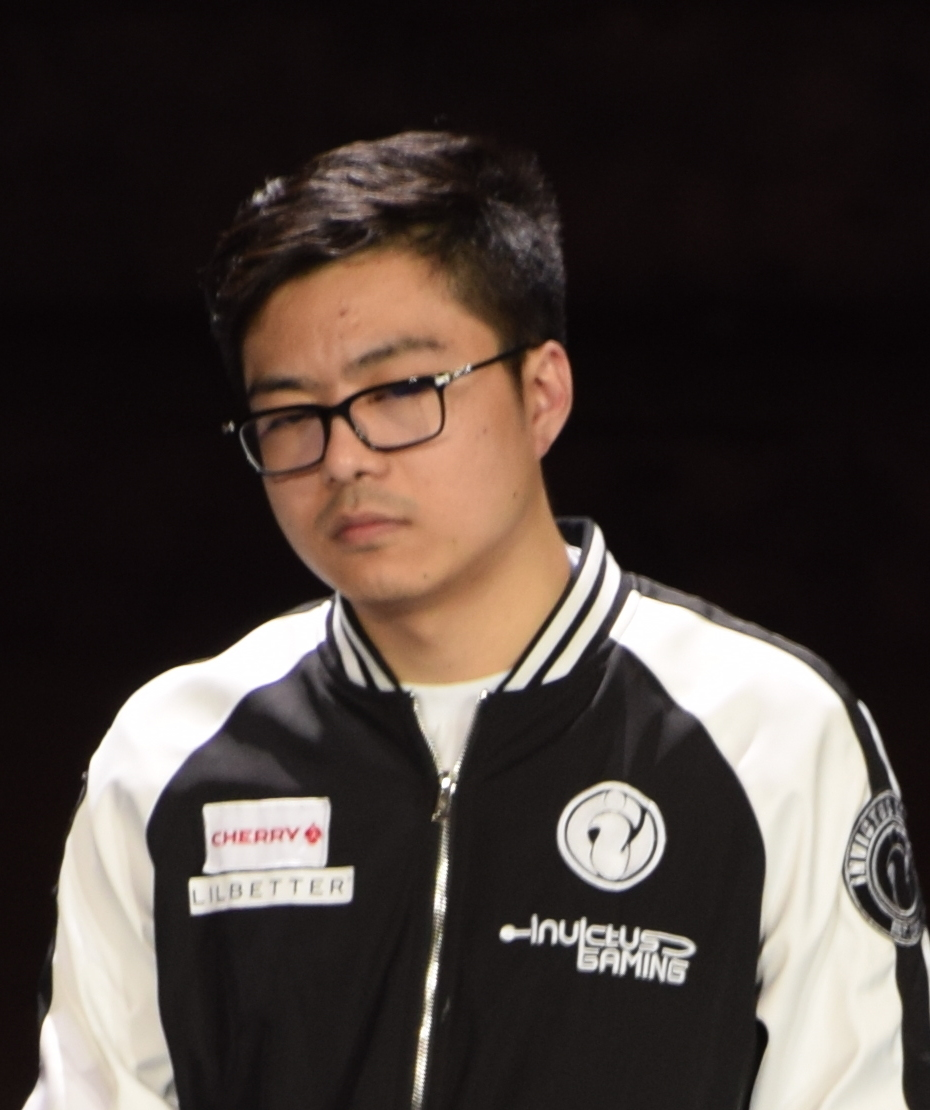
- Xu in 2017
- Born: 1987 or 1988 (age 37–38)
- Title: Co-owner of Team Aster

Esports career information
- Games: Defense of the Ancients; Dota 2
- Playing career: 2008–2018

Team history
- 2008: CaNt
- 2008–2009: 7L
- 2009: Ks.cn
- 2009: CityHunter
- 2010–2011: EHOME
- 2011–2014: Team DK
- 2014–2015: Big God
- 2015: Invictus Gaming
- 2015–2016: Vici Gaming
- 2016–2018: Invictus Gaming

Xu Zhilei (Chinese: 徐志雷), known by his in-game tag BurNIng (commonly written as Burning), is a Chinese professional gamer. He has played both Defense of the Ancients and Dota 2 professionally, and he is considered one of the best carry players in the history of Dota. In 2012, IceFrog, the developer of DotA and Dota 2, honored BurNIng by naming his signature hero Anti-Mage after him in the original Dota game. In September 2018, he founded a new team called "Team Aster".

== Dota ==
Burning started playing Dota professionally in 2008, and bounced around various teams before joining EHOME in 2010. EHOME would win 10 championships in 2010, including a dominating performance at Electronic Sports World Cup 2010 where the team didn't drop a game against some of the best Dota teams in the world.

In the beginning of 2011, Burning and teammate Zhou "KingJ" Yang left EHOME to join Team DK. 2011 proved to be another big year for Burning, winning 9 championships.

== Dota 2 ==
After not receiving an invite to The International 2011, Team DK switched over to Dota 2, and received an invite to The International 2012. Team DK finished 4th, losing to eventual finalists Natus Vincere in the winner's bracket, then eventual champions Invictus Gaming in the loser's bracket.

Burning announced before The International 2013 that he would retire after the tournament was over. At The International 2013, they managed to avenge last year's loss to Invictus, but were sent to the loser's bracket by eventual champions Alliance, then knocked out by Malaysian squad Orange Esports, finishing tied for 5th place.

Burning did not retire after the tournament as he had planned, but the team would have to be rebuilt around him as everyone else on Team DK was removed from the team.

After signing top players, including those from other regions outside of China such as iceiceice and Mushi, Team DK had what was regarded as an all-star roster and started off 2014 by finally winning an offline tournament, winning the WPC ACE Dota 2 League 2013, with a 4–3 win over Invictus in the finals on New Year's Day. Team DK would win 2 more offline tournaments, as well as several online tournaments heading into The International 2014. At The International 2014, Team DK would finish 4th, losing to Evil Geniuses in the winner's bracket, then fellow Chinese team Vici Gaming in the loser's bracket. After The International 2014, Burning announced his retirement.

In December 2014, Burning formed a team named Big God, which included several well-known veterans. The other members of the team were Zhang "xiao8" Ning (the captain), Bai "rOtk" Fan, Zhang "LaNm" Zhicheng. After Big God finished 4th at the Dota 2 Asia Championships in January 2015. Afterwards, the players went their separate ways.

In February 2015, Burning confirmed during his streaming that he would be joining Invictus Gaming. He officially joined the team next month.

At The International 2015, Invictus Gaming finished in 9th-12th place after losing to Team Secret. The next month, Burning joined Vici Gaming, reuniting with former DK teammates Daryl "iceiceice" Koh Pei Xiang and Xie "Super" Junhao.
