= Vasilii (gamer) =

Chinese streamer and former professional League of Legends player

Personal information
- Name: 李威俊 (Li Weijun)
- Born: 1993 or 1994 (age 32–33)
- Nationality: Chinese

Career information
- Games: League of Legends
- Playing career: 2012–2017

Team history
- 2012: EHOME
- 2012–2013: Royal Club
- 2013–2014: LMQ
- 2014–2016: Vici Gaming
- 2016–2017: IN Gaming
- 2017: Newbee

Chinese name
- Chinese: 李威俊
Transcriptions
Standard Mandarin
- Hanyu Pinyin: Lǐ Wēijùn

Chinese alias
- Chinese: 死亡宣告
- Literal meaning: declaration of death
Transcriptions
Standard Mandarin
- Hanyu Pinyin: sǐwáng xuāngào

Li Weijun (Chinese: 李威俊), better known by his online alias Vasilii, (Note: Li uses the online alias "死亡宣告" (literally "declaration of death") on Chinese platforms.) is a Chinese video game streamer and former professional League of Legends player. In late 2017, Li was given an 18-month competitive ban by Riot Games for beating his girlfriend during a livestream, an incident which prompted Chinese authorities to investigate and arrest him for domestic violence. Prior to his suspension he was a member of LPL team Newbee, and he was best known outside of China as the former AD carry for LCS team LMQ.

== Career ==
=== 2014 season ===
On 15 December 2013, LMQ left its parent organization Tian Ci and obtained a new sponsor in iBUYPOWER. With the assistance of its new sponsor, LMQ moved to North America to take advantage of the superior esports infrastructure. At this point, Dreams and Wayoff left the team, to be replaced by Royal Club top laner GoDlike, who renamed to ackerman.

While competing in the second Challenger Series, LMQ was also offered an invite to the North American Challenger League (NACL) Season 2 Qualifiers, where they went undefeated and secured a spot in the league. During the league's regular season, LMQ went 18–4 without a losing record against any team. During the March playoffs, LMQ defeated Cloud 9 Tempest 2–1 in the semifinals and moved on to face Team 8 in the tournament's grand finals. LMQ won the final series 3–1 and became NACL champions.

After having secured a spot in the semi-finals of the Challenger Series playoffs due to their tremendous number of points accumulated from both Challenger Series, LMQ went on to defeat Curse Academy in a 2–0 victory sending them to the finals against the tough Cloud 9 Tempest. After an initial loss in the best of five series, LMQ came back winning two in a row to make the series 2–1. Cloud 9 Tempest however, bounced back in game four to tie up the series 2–2. After a very low-kill game game five, Cloud 9 Tempest attempt to make a pick, but instead gets nearly aced and loses the game to LMQ. LMQ left the Challenger Series playoffs with a 5–2 record and went home with the grand prize of $16,000.

In April 2014, LMQ secured a spot for the 2014 NA LCS Summer Split after beating XDG Gaming 3–0 in the 2014 Season Summer Promotion Tournament. In the LCS, LMQ made an immediate impact, opening with a 4–0 week. Despite some relative floundering in the mid-season, LMQ found themselves back on top of the standings entering the last week of play. With a 2–2 week to end the season, LMQ dropped to second beneath Cloud 9. Although the two teams had the same 18–10 record, Cloud 9 held the tiebreaker with a 3–1 season head-to-head record against LMQ. Nevertheless, LMQ entered the NA LCS Summer Playoffs with the second seed and a first round bye.

In playoffs, the team fell to Team SoloMid 2–3 in a close series. They played against Team Curse in the 3rd place match and started off 0–2 but pulled off a reverse sweep and won the series 3–2. This qualified them for the 2014 World Championship where they were placed in Group C with Samsung Galaxy Blue, Fnatic and OMG. Despite a great start in the first day after defeating Fnatic and OMG, LMQ lost their remaining 4 games and was knocked out in groups. In December 2014, LMQ re-branded to Team Impulse with Li leaving the team and moving back to China due to having to take care of his family.

=== 2015 season ===
Li joined Vici Gaming in November 2014 for the 2015 LPL Season. Vici finished the regular season of the spring split in 4th but they stumbled in the playoffs and lost to Invictus Gaming 1–3 in the Quarterfinals. However, Li subbed out halfway through the season with Endless because of his poor performances early in the season. After the Spring Split, Li did not play any other games for Vici, streaming under the organization instead.

== 2017 arrest and aftermath ==
Li was arrested by police in late 2017 after beating his girlfriend during a livestream. He was subsequently dropped by his team Newbee, and suspended from all Riot-sanctioned tournaments until 1 January 2020.

Following his release, Li announced he would shift his focus to streaming full-time. He streamed on Chinese platform DouYu until 24 January 2018, when DouYu announced it was suspending Vasilii's account and submitting a request to authorities to have him permanently barred from streaming online. Li began streaming on YY on 27 January, but his YY account was suspended two days later.

== Tournament results ==
- 4th — 2015 Spring LPL season
- 3rd–4th — 2015 Spring LPL playoffs
