= TI4 =

TI4 may refer to:

- The International 2014, a Dota 2 tournament
- Twilight Imperium: Fourth Edition, a 2017 board game
