= Banana (gamer) =

Chinese esports player

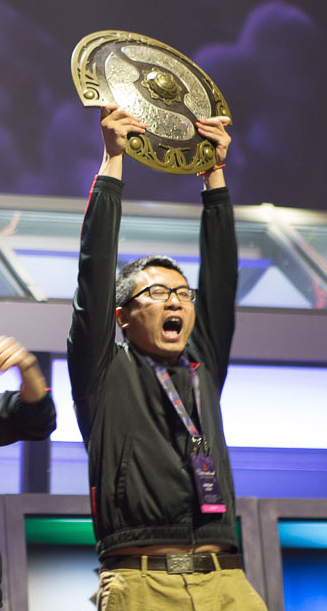
- Wang after winning The International 4

Personal information
- Name: Wang Jiao
- Nationality: Chinese

Current team
- Team: Newbee
- Role: Coach
- Game: Dota 2

Career information
- Games: Dota; Dota 2
- Playing career: 2009–2016
- Coaching career: 2016–present

Team history

As player:
- 2009–2010: xFy
- 2010–2011: Nirvana.cn
- 2012: Radiance
- 2012–2013: For.Love
- 2013: TongFu
- 2013–2014: Invictus Gaming
- 2014–2016: Newbee

As coach:
- 2016–2017: LGD Gaming
- 2017–2018: LGD.Forever Young
- 2018–present: Newbee

Career highlights and awards
- The International champion (2014)

Wang Jiao (Chinese: 王蛟), known by his tag Banana, is a Chinese Dota 2 player who is currently the coach for Newbee. He was part of the Newbee team that won what was then the single largest money prize in video game history, a US$5,028,308 payout at The International 4 (TI4) at the KeyArena, in Seattle, Washington. Newbee defeated ViCi Gaming three game to one. e-Sports Earnings estimates that Banana has won a total of US$1,192,049.89 individually from tournaments. As of April 14, 2015, after TI4 Wang "Banana" Jiao was the highest ranking player in terms of prize money won across all competitive video games. Banana joined Newbee in March 2014.

== Tournament placings ==
=== Defense of the Ancients ===
Team	Date	Placing	Event
XFy	2009-12-01	1st	Alienware Dota League 2009
Nirvana.cn	2010-11-07	1st	The DotA Razer Global Challenge
Nirvana.cn	2010-11-14	1st	World DotA Championship 2010
Nirvana.cn	2011-12-04	2nd	SMM Grand National Final DotA Tournament 2011

=== Dota 2 ===
Team	Date	Placing	Event
TongFu	2013-05-15	1st	AMD Premier League Season 1
TongFu	2013-07-06	1st	Dota 2 Super League
TongFu	2013-08-11	4th	The International 2013
NewBee	2014-05-25	1st	MarsTV Dota 2 League 2014
NewBee	2014-07-21	1st	The International 2014
NewBee	2014-09-26	5 - 8th	i-league
NewBee	2014-10-05	1st	World Cyber Arena 2014
NewBee	2014-12-07	1st	National Electronic Sports Open 2014
NewBee	2014-12-30	1st	ECL 2014 Autumn
NewBee	2015-02-01	13 - 16th	Dota 2 Asia Championships
NewBee	2015-08-03	13 - 16th	The International 2015
NewBee	2015-11-16	13 - 16th	Frankfurt Major 2015
