= Wang Jiao =

Wang Jiao may refer to:

- Wang Jiao (wrestler) (born 1988), female Chinese Olympic freestyle wrestler
- Wang Jiao (wrestler, born 1994) (born 1994), female Chinese freestyle wrestler
- Wang Jiao (DotA), Chinese professional Defense of the Ancients player
- Wang Jiao (footballer) (born 1995), Chinese football player
- The Mandarin name for Mong Kok
