= The International 2018 =

2018 esports tournament

Tournament information
- Game: Dota 2
- Location: Vancouver, Canada
- Dates: August 20–25, 2018
- Administrator: Valve
- Tournament formats: Group stage; Round robin; Main event; Double elimination
- Venue: Rogers Arena
- Participants: 18 teams
- Purse: US$25,532,177

Final positions
- Champions: OG
- 1st runner-up: PSG.LGD
- 2nd runner-up: Evil Geniuses

The International 2018 (TI8) was the eighth iteration of The International, an annual Dota 2 world championship esports tournament. Hosted by Valve, the game's developer, TI8 followed a year-long series of tournaments awarding qualifying points, known as the Dota Pro Circuit (DPC), with the top eight ranking teams being directly invited to the tournament. In addition, ten more teams earned invites through qualifiers that were held in June 2018, with the group stage and main event played at the Rogers Arena in Vancouver in August. The best-of-five grand finals took place between OG and PSG.LGD, with OG winning the series 3–2. Their victory was considered a Cinderella and underdog success story, as they had come from the open qualifiers and were not favored to win throughout the competition.

As with every International from 2013 onwards, the prize pool was crowdfunded by the Dota 2 community via its battle pass feature, with the total being over US$25 million, making it one of the largest for any esports tournament. Other events took place during the tournament, including a cosplay competition and submitted short film contest with their own independent prize pools, as well as two live demonstration games of a team of professional players playing against a team of five OpenAI-curated bots, known as the OpenAI Five, to showcase the capability of machine learning. In addition to nearly 20,000 spectators at the Rogers Arena, the tournament was livestreamed and seen by over 15 million people online. A documentary film following OG and PSG.LGD through the grand finals was released in January 2019. OG would later win The International 2019 the following year, becoming the first repeat champion of the International.

== Overview ==
Dota 2 is a 2013 multiplayer online battle arena (MOBA) video game developed by Valve. In it, two teams of five players compete by selecting characters known as "heroes", each with a variety of innate skills and abilities, and cooperate to be the first to destroy the base of the other team, which ends the match. The game is played from a top-down perspective, and the player sees a segment of the game's map near their character as well as mini-map that shows their allies, with any enemies revealed outside the fog of war. The game's map has three roughly symmetric "lanes" between each base, with several defensive towers protecting each side. Periodically, the team's base spawns a group of weak CPU-controlled creatures, called "creeps", that march down each of the three lanes towards the opponents' base, fighting any enemy hero, creep, or structure they encounter. If a hero character is killed, that character respawns back at their base after a delay period, which gets progressively longer the farther into the match.

As with previous years of the tournament, a corresponding battle pass for Dota 2 was released in May 2018, allowing the prize pool to be crowdfunded by players of the game. Known as the "Compendium", 25% of revenue made by it was sent directly towards the tournament's prize pool, which Valve started at a base US$1.6 million. At the time of event, Dota 2 featured 115 playable characters, called "heroes". Prior to each game in the tournament, a draft was held between the opposing team captains to select which heroes their teams use, going back and forth until each side has banned six and selected five heroes. Once a hero is picked, it cannot be selected by any other player that match, so teams used the draft to strategically plan ahead and deny the opponent's heroes that may be good counters or would be able to take advantage of weaknesses to their current lineup. The first pick in a match is decided by a pre-game coin toss, and then alternates between each game in that series. The team that does not get first pick gets the option of which side of the map to play on, a strategic benefit.

=== Format ===
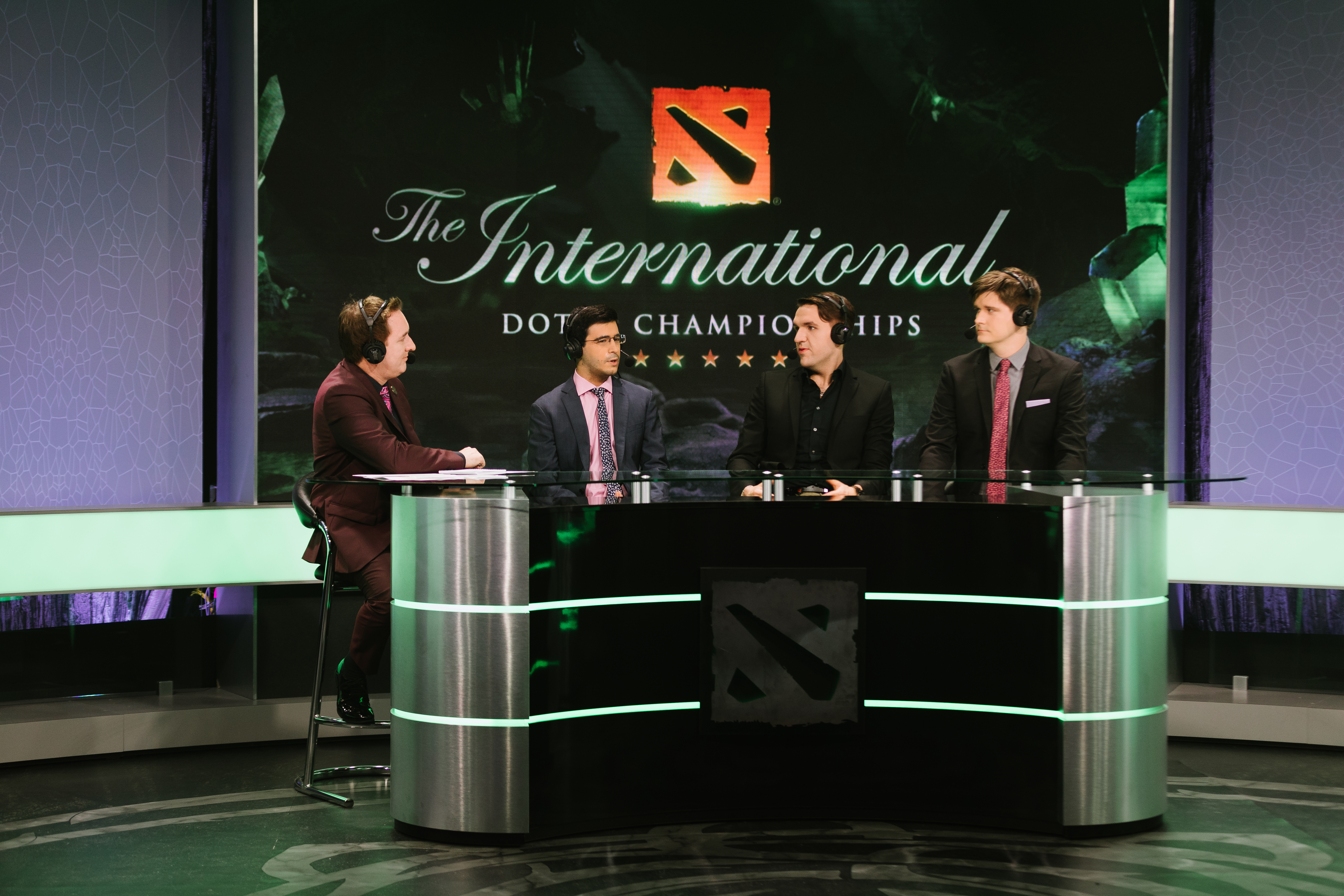
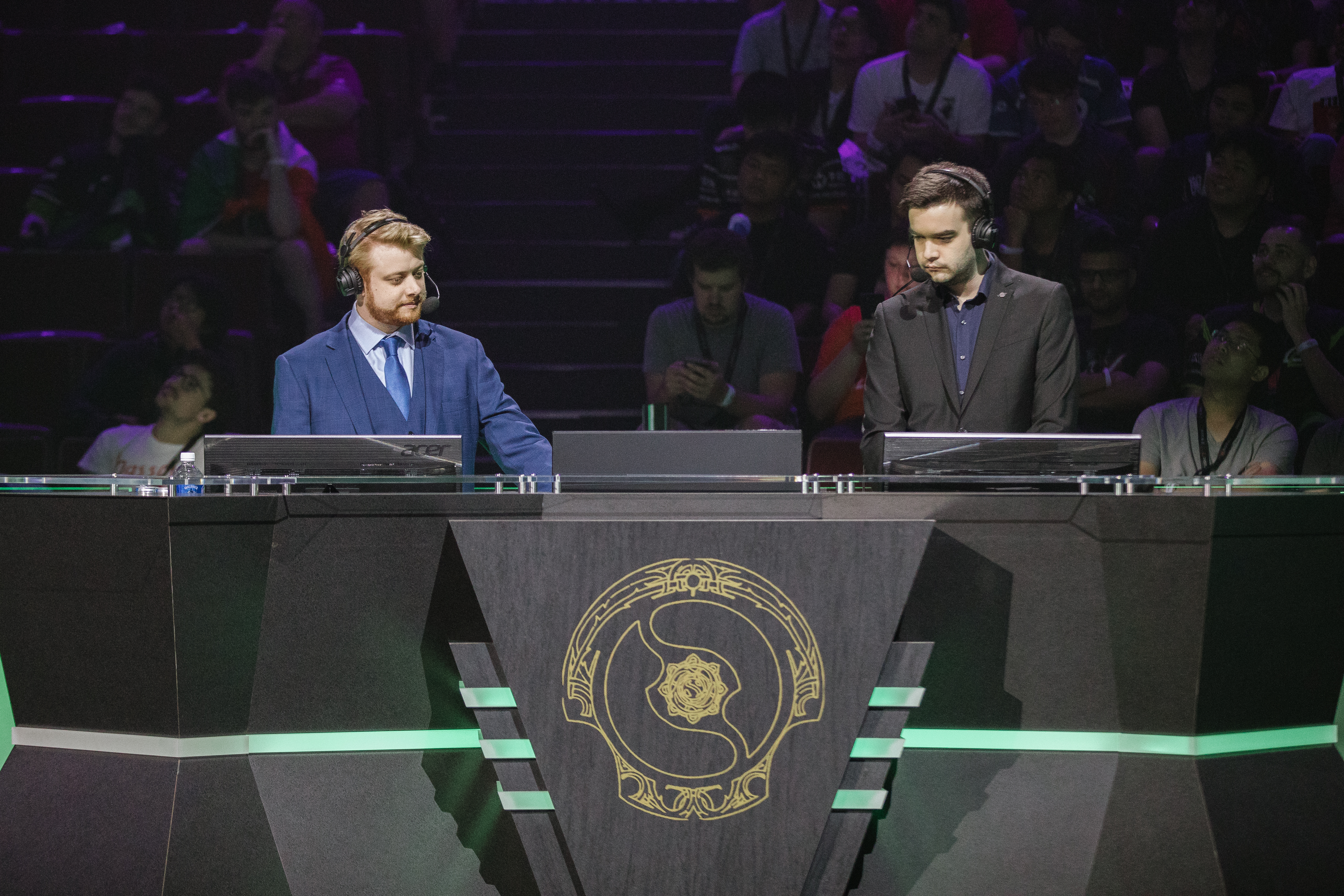
As with traditional sporting events, the tournament featured pre- and post-game discussion by a panel of analysts (top), with in-match casting being done by play-by-play and color commentators (bottom).

A change from previous Internationals, The International 2018 featured a series of tournaments running from October 2017 until June 2018, known as the Dota Pro Circuit (DPC), that awarded qualifying points with the top eight ranking teams receiving direct invitations. For the first time since The International 2013, the main event was not held at the KeyArena in Seattle, due to it undergoing renovation construction at the time, and was instead held at the Rogers Arena in Vancouver, Canada from August 20–25, 2018. The event was also broadcast on a number of livestreams, such as on Twitch and Steam.tv, with the latter being introduced specifically for the tournament. As with most major Dota 2 tournaments, the event had English, Chinese, and Russian-language broadcasting crews, with all of them having a large group of dedicated analysts and game casters.

The eight DPC teams to earn invites were Virtus.pro, PSG.LGD, Team Liquid, Team Secret, Mineski, Vici Gaming, Newbee, and VGJ.Thunder. In addition, twelve open qualifier single-elimination playoff brackets, two from each region, were held from June 14–18, 2018, with any eligible team able to participate in them, including non-professional ones. Winners of them advanced to the main qualifiers, which were held from June 18–25 and consisted of six regional brackets where an additional ten teams, Team Serenity, Invictus Gaming, Winstrike Team, OG, VGJ.Storm, Evil Geniuses, OpTic Gaming, paiN Gaming, Fnatic, and TNC Predator, earned invites by winning their respective regions.

To seed the elimination bracket for the main event, two separate round robin group stages featuring all 18 teams were played from August 15–18. Each of the teams played each other within their group in a two-game series. The top four placing teams of each group advanced to the upper bracket, while the fifth through eight advanced to the lower bracket. The lowest placed team from both groups were eliminated from the competition. The main event featured two brackets, an upper and lower, in a double-elimination tournament format. Winning teams of the upper bracket, played in a best-of-three match format, advanced to the next round, while the losing team would then be placed in respective rounds of the lower bracket. The winner of the upper bracket moved to the grand finals. Teams who were seeded into the lower bracket from the group stage played best-of-one games, with the loser being immediately eliminated. All later round matches in the lower bracket were played to best-of-three, with the winner of the lower bracket advancing to the grand finals, played as a best-of-five series, to face the winner of the upper bracket.

Direct invitation (DPC)

- (Russia) Virtus.pro
- (China) PSG.LGD
- (European Union) Team Liquid
- (European Union) Team Secret
- (Philippines) Mineski
- (China) Vici Gaming
- (China) Newbee
- (China) VGJ.Thunder

Regional qualifier winners

- Team Serenity (China)
- Invictus Gaming (China)
- (Russia) Winstrike Team (CIS)
- (European Union) OG (Europe)
- (United States) VGJ.Storm (North America)
- (United States) Evil Geniuses (North America)
- (United States) OpTic Gaming (North America)
- (Brazil) paiN Gaming (South America)
- (Malaysia) Fnatic (Southeast Asia)
- (Philippines) TNC Predator (Southeast Asia)

== Results ==
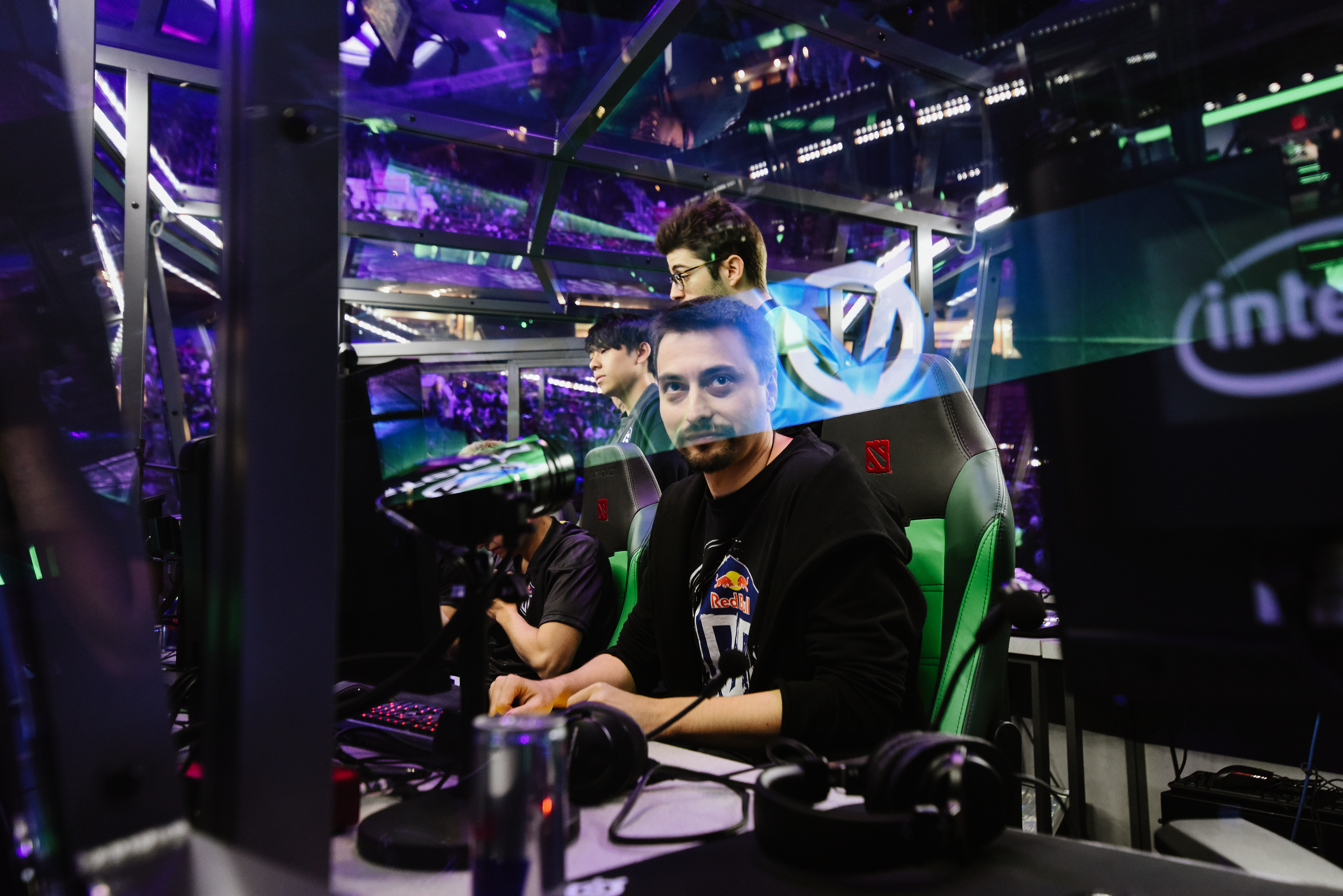
OG inside the playing booth during the hero drafting phase before one of their games

=== Group stage ===
Group A
Pos	Team	W	L	
1	Team Liquid	13	3	Advanced to the upper bracket
2	Evil Geniuses	13	3	Advanced to the upper bracket
3	PSG.LGD	11	5	Advanced to the upper bracket
4	OG	9	7	Advanced to the upper bracket
5	Fnatic	7	9	Advanced to the lower bracket
6	VGJ.Thunder	6	10	Advanced to the lower bracket
7	Mineski	5	11	Advanced to the lower bracket
8	Winstrike Team	4	12	Advanced to the lower bracket
9	Invictus Gaming	4	12	Eliminated

Group B
Pos	Team	W	L	
1	VGJ.Storm	12	4	Advanced to the upper bracket
2	Virtus.pro	10	6	Advanced to the upper bracket
3	Team Secret	8	8	Advanced to the upper bracket
4	OpTic Gaming	8	8	Advanced to the upper bracket
5	Newbee	8	8	Advanced to the lower bracket
6	TNC Predator	7	9	Advanced to the lower bracket
7	Team Serenity	7	9	Advanced to the lower bracket
8	Vici Gaming	7	9	Advanced to the lower bracket
9	paiN Gaming	5	11	Eliminated

=== Main event ===
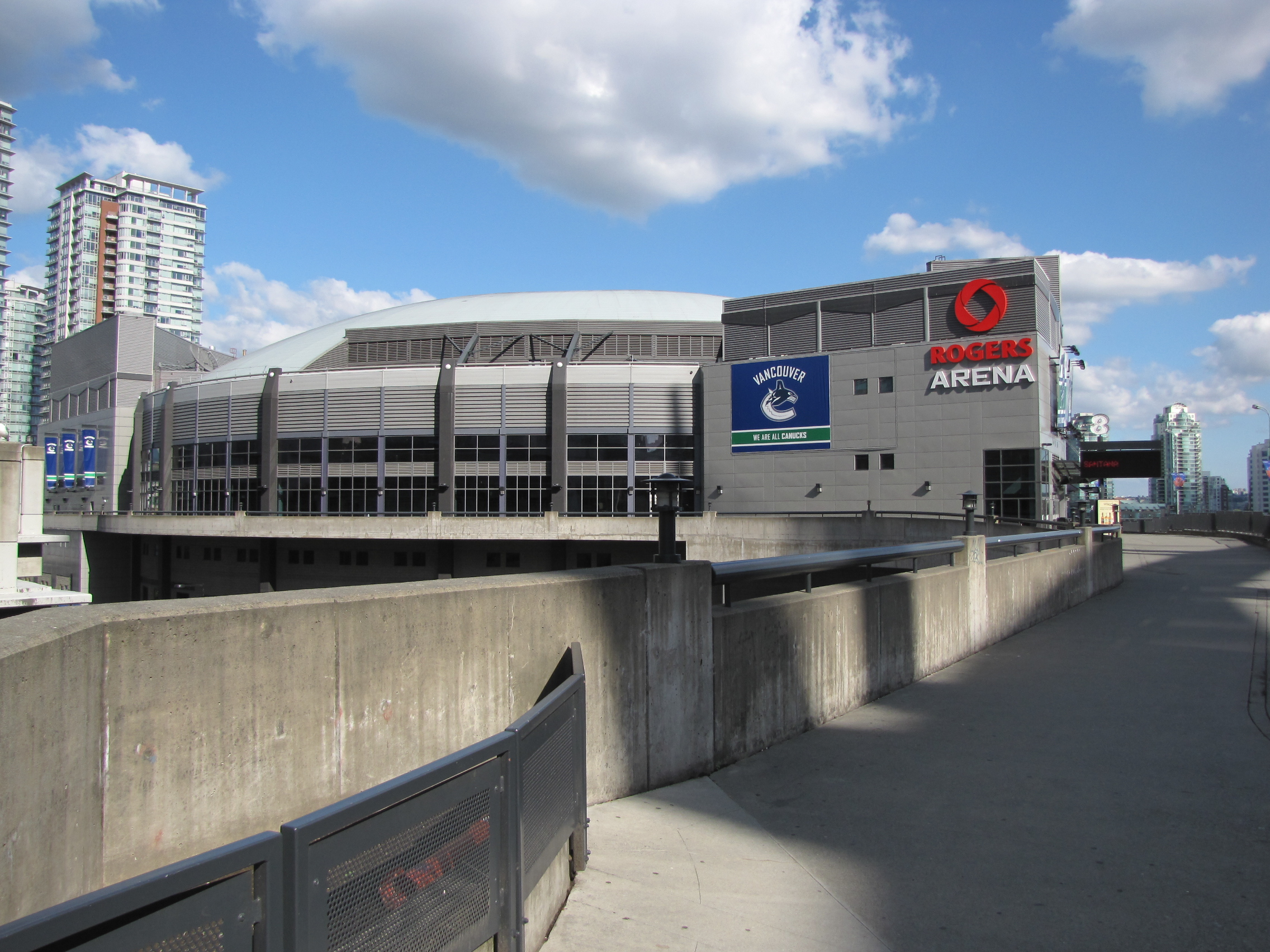
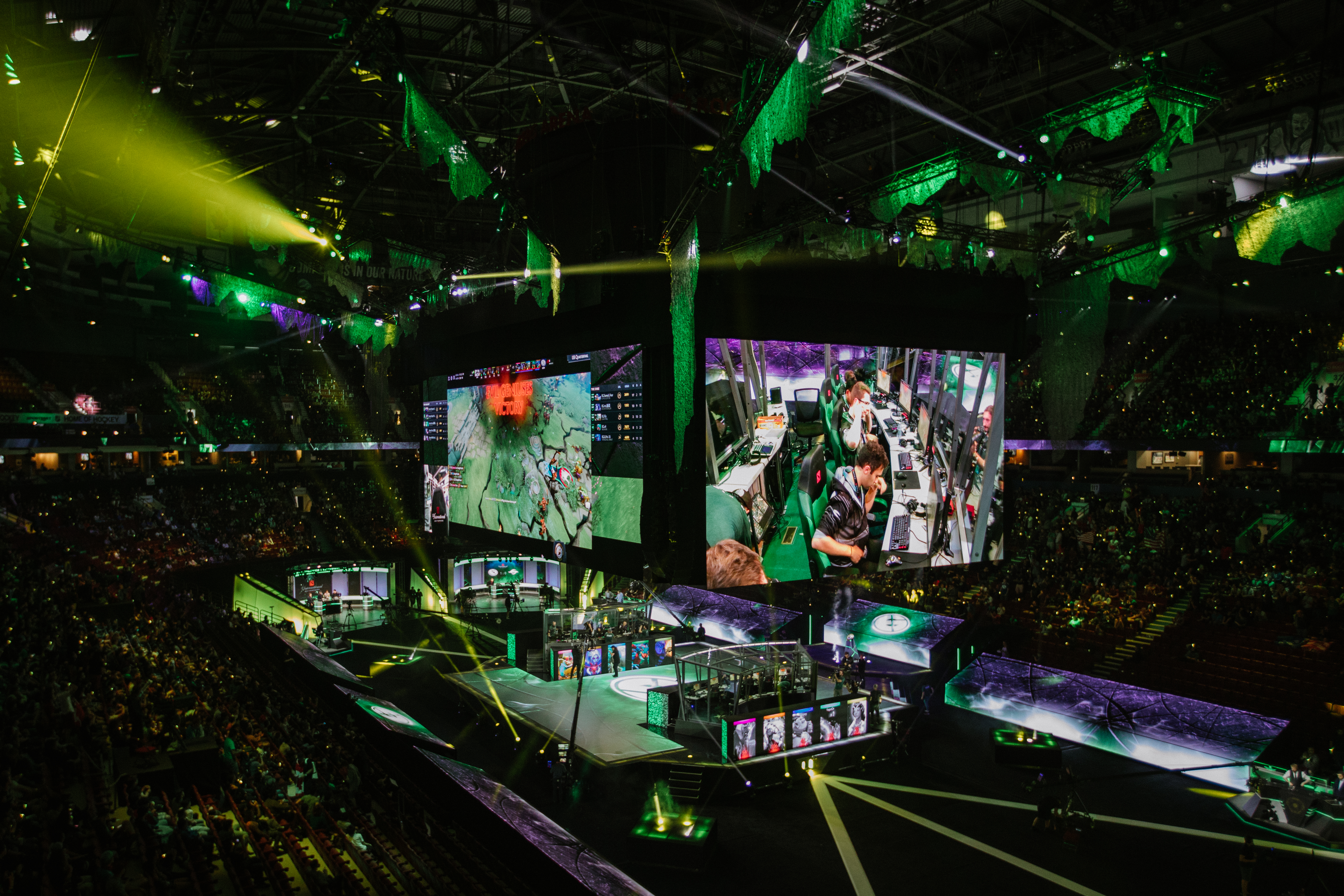
The Rogers Arena in Vancouver, the venue where the main event took place

The best-of-five grand finals took place between OG and PSG.LGD, with OG winning the series 3–2. While PSG.LGD earned a direct invite to the tournament by finishing third in the 2017–2018 Dota Pro Circuit standings, OG earned theirs by playing through and winning the European open qualifiers, which they were required to do per tournament rules following a roster shuffle after three members, Tal "Fly" Aizik, Gustav "s4" Magnusson, and Roman "Resolut1on" Fominok left the team in May 2018. Needing three new members just two weeks before the qualifiers began, OG quickly signed Topias "Topson" Taavitsainen, a newcomer to the scene who had never performed at a major LAN event prior to the event, Anathan "ana" Pham, a former member of the team who had taken a year-long break following their previous elimination at The International 2017, and Sébastien "Ceb" Debs, who had previously served as the team's coach.

Following their win at the European qualifiers, OG were then placed into group A, finishing fourth with a record of 9–7, which seeded them into the upper bracket. There, OG won every series to advance to the grand finals. Facing the lower bracket winner PSG.LGD in it, whom OG had just defeated in the upper bracket finals, OG won the game one, but lost the next two games. Needing another win to avoid losing the series, OG forced a late-game comeback in game four, and subsequently won game five, making them International champions and winning them over US$11 million in prize money. Their victory was considered a Cinderella and underdog success story, as they had come from the open qualifiers and had beaten some of the more favored and accomplished teams along the way. Their win also broke the historical trend of Chinese teams winning the International in even years. OG would also later win The International 2019 the following year, becoming the first repeat champion of an International.

==== Playoffs Bracket ====
Upper round 1	Upper round 2	Upper final	Grand Finals (Bo5)
Team Liquid	2
OpTic Gaming	0
Team Liquid	0
PSG.LGD	2
Virtus.pro	0
PSG.LGD	2
PSG.LGD	1
OG	2
VGJ.Storm	0
OG	2
OG	2
Evil Geniuses	1
Evil Geniuses	2
Team Secret	0
OG	3
PSG.LGD	2
Lower round 1	Lower round 2	Lower round 3	Lower round 4	Lower round 5	Lower final
OpTic Gaming	2
Evil Geniuses	2
Fnatic	0	Team Serenity	0
OpTic Gaming	1	Virtus.pro	0
Team Serenity	1
Virtus.pro	2	PSG.LGD	2
Virtus.pro	2
Evil Geniuses	2	Evil Geniuses	0
TNC Predator	0	Mineski	0
Team Liquid	0
Mineski	1
VGJ.Storm	2
Team Liquid	2
Newbee	0	Winstrike Team	0
VGJ.Storm	0	Team Secret	0
Winstrike Team	1
Team Secret	2
Team Secret	2
VGJ.Thunder	0	Vici Gaming	1
Vici Gaming	1

=== Winnings ===
Place	Team	Prize money (USD)
1st	OG	$11,190,158
2nd	PSG.LGD	$4,069,148
3rd	Evil Geniuses	$2,670,379
4th	Team Liquid	$1,780,252
5th–6th	Team Secret	$1,144,448
5th–6th	Virtus.pro	$1,144,448
7th–8th	OpTic Gaming	$635,804
7th–8th	VGJ.Storm	$635,804
9th–12th	Mineski	$381,483
9th–12th	Team Serenity	$381,483
9th–12th	Vici Gaming	$381,483
9th–12th	Winstrike Team	$381,483
13th–16th	Fnatic	$127,161
13th–16th	Newbee	$127,161
13th–16th	TNC Predator	$127,161
13th–16th	VGJ.Thunder	$127,161
17th–18th	Invictus Gaming	$63,580
17th–18th	paiN Gaming	$63,580

== Legacy ==
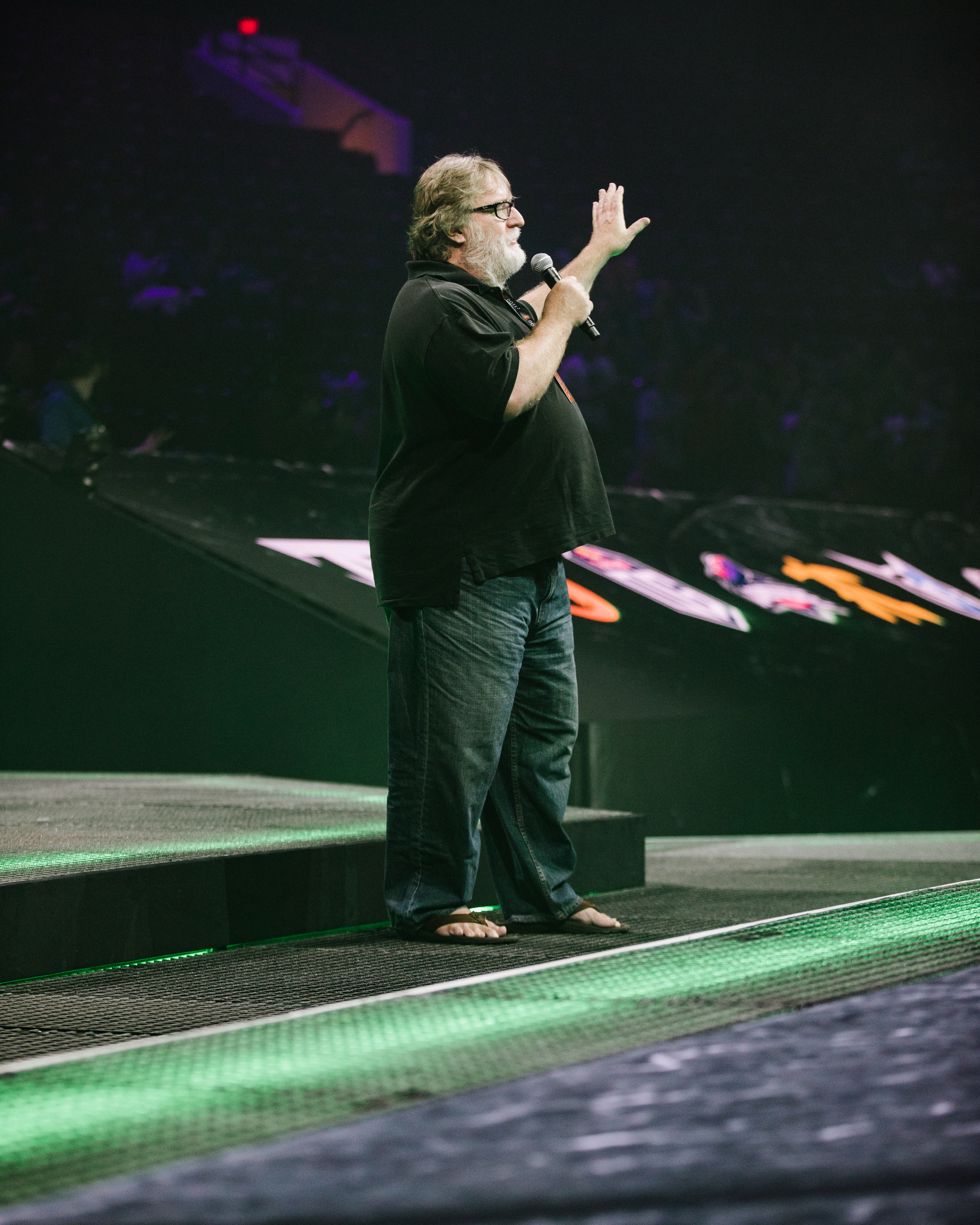
Valve founder and president Gabe Newell giving a speech at the opening ceremony

At the time, The International 2018 set a crowdfunded esport prize pool record by eclipsing the previous years' record, finalizing at US$25,532,177. Other related events took place during the tournament, such as a cosplay and submitted short film contest with their own independent prize pools. In addition, two live demonstrations of a team of professional players playing against a team of five OpenAI-curated bots, known as the OpenAI Five, took place to showcase the capability of machine learning. Although the bots lost both games, the first against paiN Gaming and the second against an all-star team of former Chinese players, they were considered a success by OpenAI who stated that due to the bots playing against some of the best players in Dota 2, it allowed them to analyze and adjust their algorithms for future games.

Attendees of the event at the Rogers Arena were given a free copy of Artifact, a then-upcoming Dota 2-themed digital collectible card game. New content for the game itself was also revealed during the event, including two new playable heroes and a Gabe Newell voice pack. The tournament was seen by over 15 million people online, with nearly 20,000 attending the matches at the Rogers Arena. The tournament, alongside OG's upset win over PSG.LGD, were respectively nominated for "best esports event" and "best esports moment" at The Game Awards 2018 ceremony. An episode of True Sight, Valve's documentary film series on the professional Dota 2 scene, was filmed during the event. It followed OG and PSG.LGD during the grand finals, documenting a number of behind the scenes moments for both teams before and after matches. It was released online for free on January 15, 2019, and also premiered to a live audience, with members of OG as special guests, at the Palads Teatret in Copenhagen.
