= G-League (esports) =

Tournament information
- Game: Defense of the Ancients, Street Fighter V
- Location: Shanghai, China
- Established: 2009
- Number of tournaments: Number of tournaments

G-League is an esports tournament held in Shanghai, China since 2009. Hosted by Gamefy, the series started out as a seasonal Defense of the Ancients tournament before changing to an annual format in 2012.

== Tournament history ==
=== 2009-2013 ===
From 2009 to 2012, multiple DotA Allstars tournaments were held every year. In 2011, such tournaments attracted hundreds of players and were broadcast live. From 2012 onwards, Gamefy began hosting an annual Dota 2 tournament under the G-League moniker.

=== 2014 ===
The Dota 2 tournament at G-League 2014 was won by Team DK, beating Invictus Gaming in the finale and winning $33,000 USD.

=== 2015 ===
LGD Gaming won G-League in 2015, winning $32,700 in prize money.

=== 2016 ===
G-League 2016 featured a Street Fighter V tournament that was a Premier Event of the Capcom Pro Tour, meaning that the winner of the tournament would automatically qualify for the 2016 Capcom Cup. The tournament was won by Chinese player Zeng "XiaoHai" Zhuojun, beating Kun Xian Ho in the finals.
