= Team DK =

- Divisions: Dota 2 Heroes of the Storm; StarCraft II
- Founded: 2010
- Folded: November 2015
- Location: China
- Manager: Teng "Andy" Zhao

Team DK was a Chinese esports organization that fielded Dota 2, Heroes of the Storm and StarCraft II teams. The Dota 2 team finished 4th at The International 2014. It folded in November 2015 citing difficulty competing with more well-financed teams.

== Former players ==
- Xu "BurNIng" Zhilei (Dota 2)

== Tournament results ==
- 4th — The International 2012
- 5th–8th — The International 2013
- 4th — The International 2014
