= Newbee =

Chinese esports organization

- Divisions: Dota 2 Starcraft 2 Hearthstone; Warcraft 3
- Founded: 2014; 12 years ago
- Disbanded: 2021
- Location: China

Newbee (Chinese: 新兵电子竞技俱乐部) is a Chinese esports organization, which has a Dota 2 division and formerly ones in League of Legends and Hearthstone. Newbee won The International 2014, taking $5 million in prize money, setting a Guinness World Record for the greatest prize money in an esports competition at the time. In February 2021, Newbee received a permanent ban from participating in official Dota 2 championships. As of 2023 there have been no active divisions.

== Dota 2 ==
=== History ===
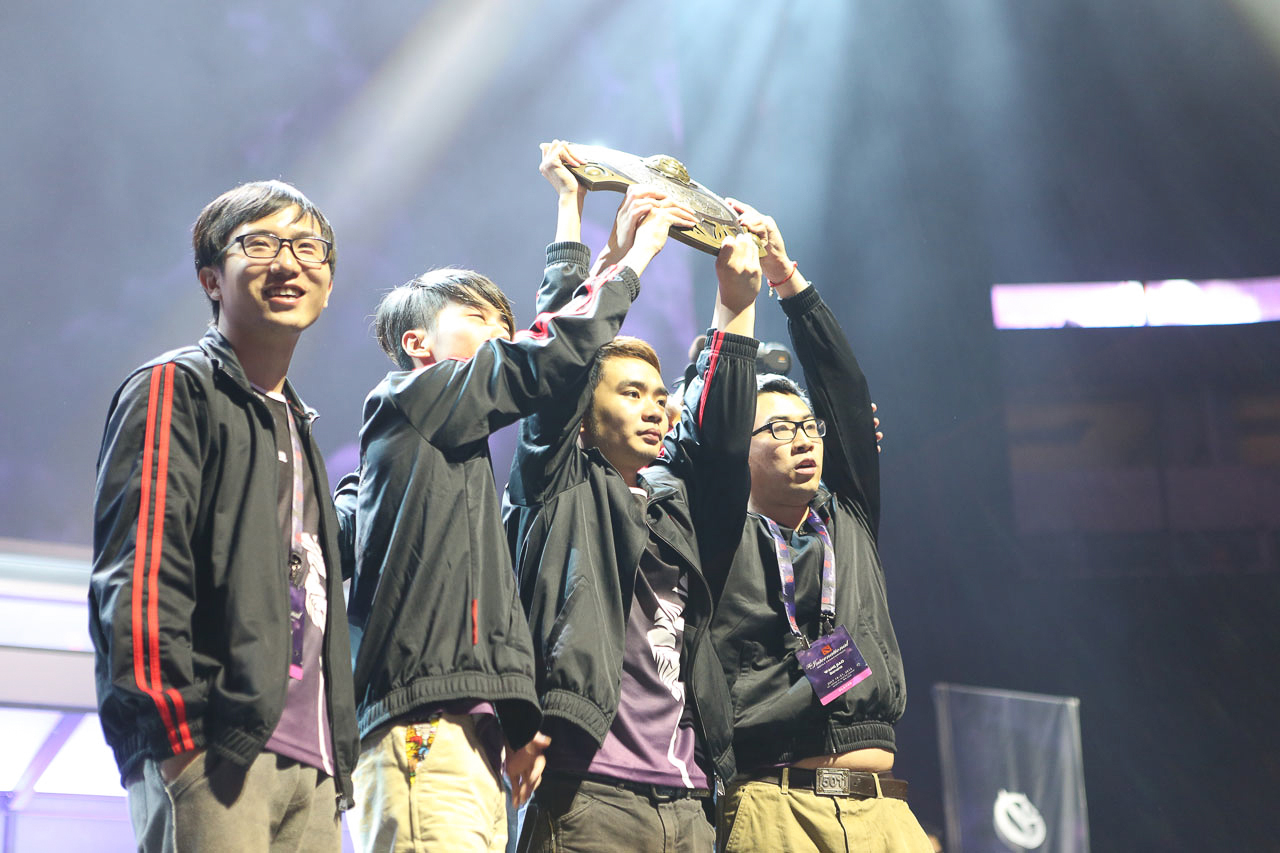
Newbee after winning The International 2014

Newbee was founded by Zhang "Xiao8" Ning and is sponsored by billionaire Wang "Niuwa" Yue. It emerged in early 2014 during the Chinese reshuffle. Originally dubbed "Dream Team 2", the rumors started after captain Zhang "xiao8" Ning made a post on his QQ micro-blogging page, saying "New start in 2014 after 3 years in LGD", forever Dream 5." The rumors later placed Zhang "Mu" Pan, Zeng "Faith" Hongda, Chen "Hao" Zhihao and Wong "ChuaN" Hock Chuan in the team together with xiao8. However, at last, on 23 February 2014, ACE Dota organization announced dubbed team "Newbee" consisted of xiao8, Mu, Hao, Zhou "KingJ" Yang and Gong "ZSMJ" Jian. Then Wang "Banana" Jiao transferred to the team, replacing ZSMJ and Wang "SanSheng" Zhaohui joins the team, replacing KingJ. Tong "mikasa" Junjie became the coach of this team and former Noah's Ark player Li "Li" Peng was the team's leader. After that, the Newbee's Dota 2 team won the MarsTV Dota 2 League without losing one game in May 2014 and placed in third in WPC League 2014 in June 2014. After these, Newbee won a direct invite to The International 2014.

In May 2014, Newbee's Dota 2 team won the MarsTV Dota 2 League without losing a game, and in June 2014, they finished third in the WPC League 2014. Following this, Newbee received a direct invite to The International 2014.

==== The International 2014 ====
In July, Newbee became the champion of The International 2014. After finishing 7–8 in the group stages, the team had to play a 3-way tiebreaker with Mousesports and LGD Gaming where the 3rd place team would be eliminated. Newbee finished 2–0 in the tiebreaker, and Mousesports went home. Qualifying for the 3rd phase, the team won a spot in the winner's bracket of the main event after defeating Titan 2–1, former TI champions Natus Vincere 2–0, then former TI champs Invictus Gaming 2–1. In the main event, Newbee defeated Vici Gaming 2-1 and Evil Geniuses 2-0 and earned a spot in the grand finals. Vici Gaming ended up winning the loser's bracket, setting up a rematch in the finals. In the grand finals, Vici won Game 1, but then Newbee won the next three, therefore winning the tournament and the $5,000,000+ prize money.

==== 2015–2020 ====
After winning the tournament, captain Xiao8 announced his retirement. Newbee acquires Wang "Rabbit" Zhang from LGD to take xiao8's place. After this change, Newbee won National Electronic Sports Open 2014, World Cyber Arena 2014, ECL 2014 Autumn and E-Sports World Championship 2014. In March 2015, Hao left Newbee to join Vici Gaming, and was replaced by Lin "June" Shiyang.

On 15 May 2020, Newbee's Dota 2 division was banned indefinitely from events organized by ImbaTV and CDA, following an investigation into allegations of match fixing. The decision was made public on the official Weibo accounts of ImbaTV and CDA, with relevant evidence being submitted to Valve and Perfect World the same day. The CDA Alliance and the Chinese Dota 2 Professional Association in partnership with the Dota 2 Professional League subsequently conducted their own investigation, and determined that Newbee was guilty of match fixing and gave lifetime bans to the team and players.

=== Tournament results ===
Place	Tournament	Location	Date	Prize money
1	The International 2014	KeyArena	31 March 2014	$5,028,308
1	6th e-Sports World Championship	Baku Crystal Hall	16 November 2014	$25,000
1	World Cyber Arena(WCA)	Yin Chuan, China	5 October 2014	¥2,000,000
1	NESO 2014	Qing Dao, China	7 December 2014	¥150,000
1	NanYang DOTA2 Championships(NYC)	Shang Hai, China	July 10，2016	$100,000
3	Dota 2 Asia Championships 2017(DAC)	Shang Hai, China	4 April 2017	$73,439
2	The Manila Masters	Manila	26 May 2017	$50,000
2	The International 2017	KeyArena	13 August 2017	$3,950,067

=== Final roster ===
Alias	Real name	Date joined
Moogy	Xu Han	2020-02-12
AQ	Yun Rui	2019-09-20
Wizard	Wen Lipeng	2019-03-20
Waixi	Yan Chao	2019-09-23
Faith	Zeng Hongda	2019-09-20

== Hearthstone ==
=== History ===
In August 2014, Newbee founded the Hearthstone squads consisted of four players. In December 2014, the Hearthstone squad of Newbee became the third place in Netease E-sports League Autumn 2014 Premier League.

=== Final roster ===
Alias	Real name
wayne	Wu Wei
God Slayer	Shen Yang

== League of Legends ==
On 15 May 2015, Newbee acquired the roster of League of Legends team Positive Energy. After qualifying for the League of Legends Secondary Pro League Summer Playoffs, they finished 4th in the playoffs, earning a spot in the Promotion playoffs. In the first round of the Promotion playoffs, however, Newbee lost to Team WE 3–0, failing to achieve promotion to the LPL.

== StarCraft II ==
=== Final roster ===
Alias	Real name	Join Date
Scarlett	Sasha Hostyn	2018-11-11
Time	Li Peinan	2018-08-03
Dear	Baek Dong Jun	2019-02-13

== Warcraft III ==
=== Final roster ===
Alias	Real name	Nationality	Date joined
LawLiet	Jo Ju Yeon	South Korea	2018-11-27
120	Guo Zixiang	China	2018-10-16
Lyn	Park Joon	South Korea	2018-12-04

Awards and achievements
Preceded by Alliance	The International winner 2014; With: Hao, Mu, xiao8, Banana, SanSheng, and Mikasa (coach)	Succeeded by Evil Geniuses
