= Vici Gaming =

Chinese esports organization

- Short name: VG
- Divisions: Counter-Strike: Global Offensive; Dota 2 Hearthstone; League of Legends; Wild Rift; Honor of Kings
- Founded: 21 September 2012; 13 years ago
- Folded: 2024
- Based in: Shanghai, China
- CEO: Lu "HunTeR" Wenjun
- Partners: HyperX, Biostar, HTC

Vici Gaming (VG) were a Chinese professional esports organization based in Shanghai. It had teams competing in Dota 2, League of Legends, StarCraft II, WarCraft III, FIFA, Hearthstone, Counter-Strike: Global Offensive and Honor of Kings. Vici Gaming's Dota 2 team had been a top contender in numerous tournaments, most notably as runners-up of The International 2014.

Vici Gaming officially exited esports as a whole after their Honor of Kings team, which competed in the franchised King Pro League, the top division of Chinese Honor of Kings esports, was sold to JD Gaming on 3 June 2024.

== Dota 2 ==
=== History ===
==== 2012 ====
Vici Gaming was founded on 21 September 2012 with the help of "Fengdidi", who previously played in PanDarea Gaming under the name PanPan, handpicking skilled players that were highly ranked on the Chinese DotA ladder at the time.

The players had no previous professional experience at the time with the exception of sydm who had played under the banner of TyLoo. Their mid lane player Cty had shown promise by winning a 1v1 tournament organized by 2009, in which he beat famous players like Ferrari_430, Sylar, Hao, and other top Chinese players shortly before getting recruited.

The team qualified for the 2012 G-League Season 2 by beating Noah's Ark in the preliminaries.

==== 2013 ====
On 28 January, Vici signed Greedy, captained by the famous YaphetS as their online/backup squad. The rest of the team consisted of xiaotuji, Maybe, nL_Ks, and CaptainGiveMeBall. They were focused on Dota, although they have since expanded to Dota 2.

On 1 March, Vici signed ZSMJ, the founder of Dota 2 squad. It was believed that ZSMJ brought some of his teammates from his project with Chisbug to Vici Gaming, of which a member is Sgua_Li. In the following weeks, Vici Gaming made some roster adjustments, dropping some players in private while sending out a public notice for interested players to contact them.

On 28 March, it was announced that carry player ZSMJ replaced mid player sydm and that former carry Cty picked up the mid role.

In June 2013, following elimination from The International 2013 qualifiers and a disappointing finish outside playoff places in DSL, Vici Gaming announced the departure of team executive, PandaPanPan, and team manager, Nada. Their replacement was mikasa, who had played as a substitute for VG.

On 31 October, Sylar joined the team as the new carry player, but would not be in the starting lineup for almost two months due to contract terms and TuTu remains to play on the ongoing 2013 WPC Ace Dota 2 League.

In December 2013, Vici Gaming traveled to Poland to compete in the Raidcall EMS Fall LAN finals, joining the ranks of teams like Alliance, Natus Vincere, and DK who were pioneers in east-west tournament participation. Vici would go on to take first place at EMS One Fall. Following this, the team also traveled to the Kingston HyperX Dota 2 League in Las Vegas., but would subsequently fall from the top of Dota 2 due to a lack of direction and poor player performances. Despite placing at many events Vici would not achieve another title in the TI3 to TI4 season.

==== 2014 ====
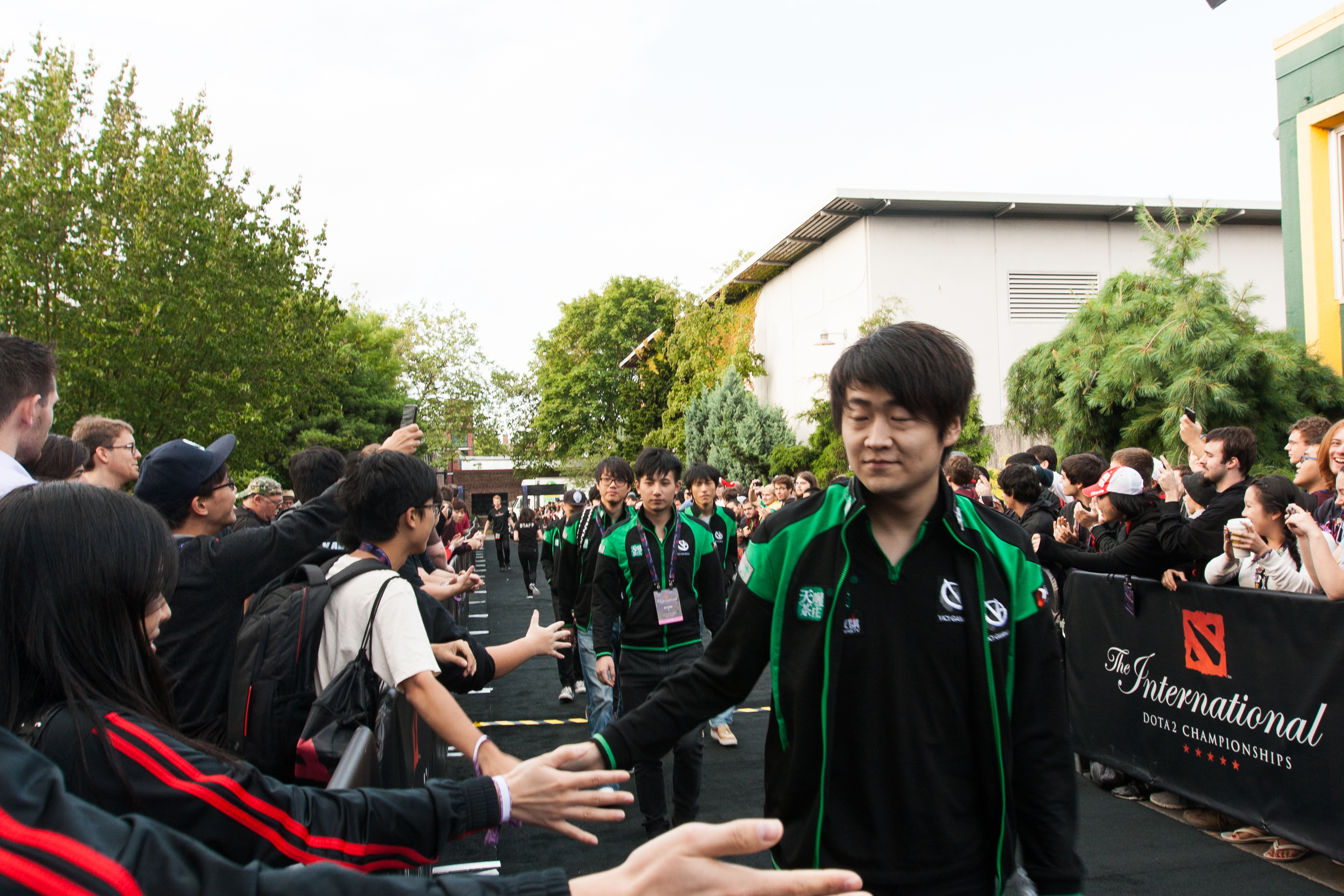
Vici Gaming at The International, July 2014.

On 16 April, it was announced that former EHOME player QQQ will be joining VG as a coach.

At the end of April 2014, Vici Gaming received an invitation to The International 2014, where they would go on to place first in the group stage and second overall. They lost to NewBee in the finals 3–1.

On 17 August, rOtK announced his retirement. 26 August – Sylar leaves the team, and Black^ and iceiceice join. VG looked very strong with their new lineup for the rest of the year, certainly the best Chinese team.

In mid December they travelled to Los Angeles to compete in The Summit 2 and as strong favorites they defeated Cloud9 for the Championship 3–1.

==== 2015 ====
VG had a strong 2015 season. In February, they reached the finals of Dota 2 Asian Championships ("the biggest event outside of The International") with not too much effort, but they lost shockingly 0–3 to Evil Geniuses in the Grand Finals, especially since they defeated them 2–0 the day before. With the next International being months away, this definitely shook up things for VG and they must've started analyzing their future and possibilities.

On 11 March, Hao joined VG, replacing Black^ in the Carry position, after a month of speculation and rumors going on.

On 15 March, the team announced the creation of a youth squad, VG.P. On 27 April, Vici won Starladder XII after defeating Invictus Gaming 3–1. They were one of the officially invited teams for The International 2015 with a complete prize pool of $18,377,817 and on 2 July they confirmed that they've obtained their USA visas, needed to participate in the event. They ended losing to LGD Gaming to finish 4th and securing $1,562,114. During the first day of The International 2015, VG became the first team outside of Europe to obtain the Verified Tag on Facebook, and third after only Fnatic and Gambit Gaming. After the annual post-TI break/shuffle period, Hao returned to Newbee and VG acquired Xu "BurNIng" Zhilei and Yang "YJ" Pu. They finished 2nd in the Nanyang Championships, falling 2–3 to Secret in the Grand Finals. They would proceed to participate in the first ever Major by Valve in Frankfurt, Germany. They finished in 5th place with $205,000 in winnings.

=== Final Roster ===
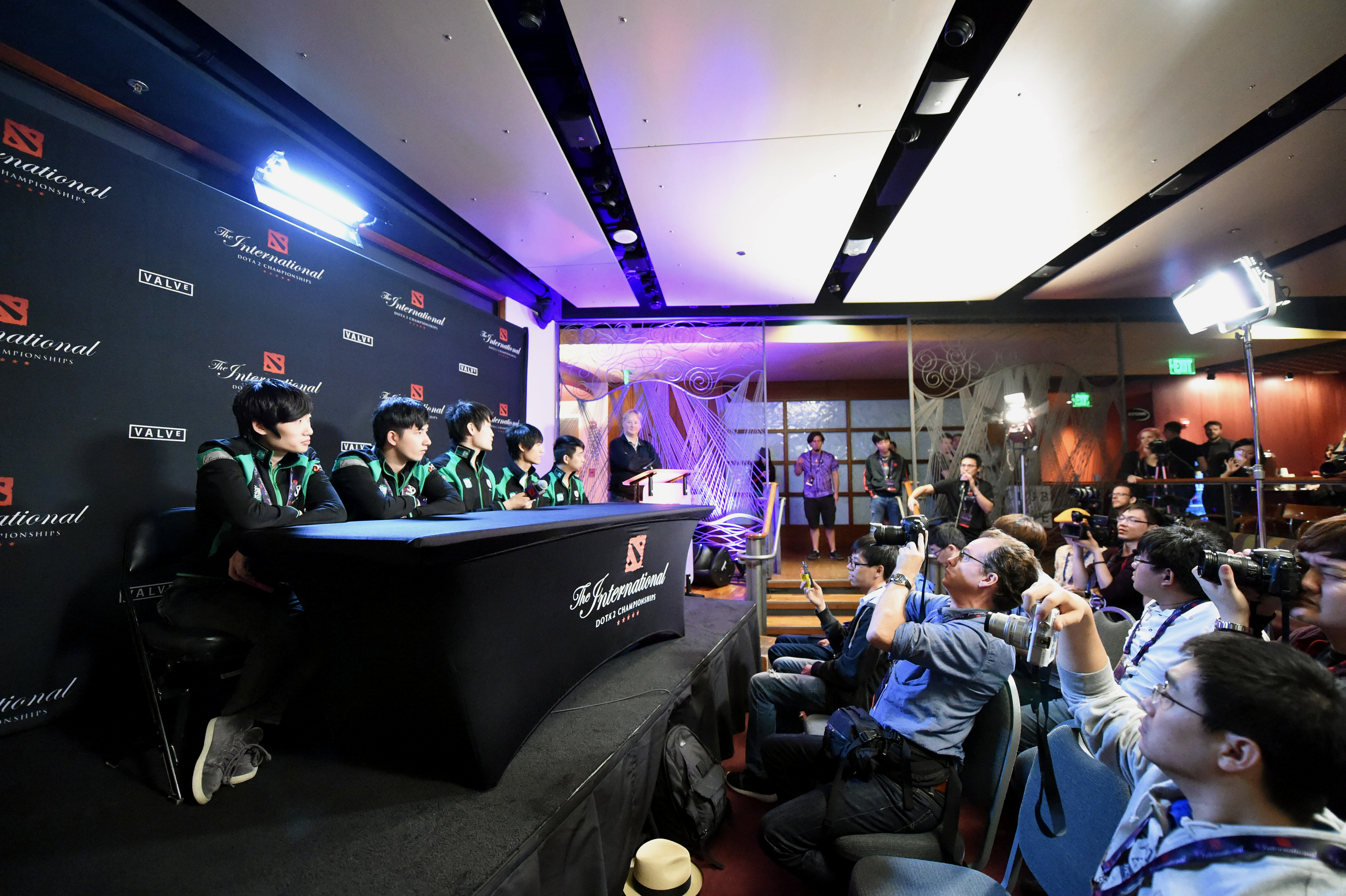
Vici Gaming's Dota 2 team at a press conference during The International 2014

ID	Name
Erika	Yang Shaohan
Setsu	Gao Zhenxiong
niu	Li Kongbo
fy	Xu Linsen
Yang	Zhou Haiyang

=== Active ===
ID	Name	Position	Join Date
shiro	Guo Xuanang	1	2025-12-24
Xm	Guo Hongcheng	2	2025-10-06
Bach	Zhang Ruida	3	2026-01-24
planet	Lin Hao	4	2025-12-24
y`	Zhang Yiping	5	2025-12-24
Maps	Wang Yutian	Coach	2025-10-06

=== VGJ ===
In September 2016, Vici Gaming signed an agreement with American basketball player Jeremy Lin and investment group China Digital Group to form another Dota 2 team, called VGJ, meant to create a celebrity brand in esports. The team later split into two branches in 2017: VGJ.Thunder, based in China, and VGJ.Storm, based in North America. In May 2018, VGJ.Storm won the GESC Thailand Dota 2 Minor tournament, while VGJ.Thunder qualified for The International 2018 with a top eight finish in the Dota Pro Circuit, with VGJ.Storm winning in the North American regional qualifiers to also gain an invite. In September 2018, the VGJ organization announced an ending to the Vici Gaming partnership due to new Dota Pro Circuit team ownership rules. As a result, it disbanded VGJ.Thunder and rebranded VGJ.Storm as J.Storm, with the team focusing on the North American esports scene.

== League of Legends ==
=== History ===
On 1 December 2015, VG signed former SKT T1 mid laner Lee "Easyhoon" Ji-hoon to their roster.

On 2 January 2021, VG rebranded as Rare Atom.

=== Final roster ===
Vici Gaming League of Legends roster
Players
Coaches

Role	Handle	Name	Nationality
Top	Cube	Dai Yi	China
Jungle	Aix	Li Yang	China
Jungle	Leyan	Lu Jue	China
Mid	FoFo	Chu Chun-Lan	Taiwan
Bot	iBoy	Hu Xianzhao	China
Support	Hang	Fu Minghang	China
Support	Maestro	Hu Jianxin	China

Head coach

Zhu "Loong" Xiao-Long

Assistant coach(es)

Xu "Endless" Hao

Legend:
- (I) Inactive
- (S) Suspended
- Substitute
- (injured) Injury / Illness

Roster updated 14 June 2020.
