= Alliance (esports) =

European esports organization

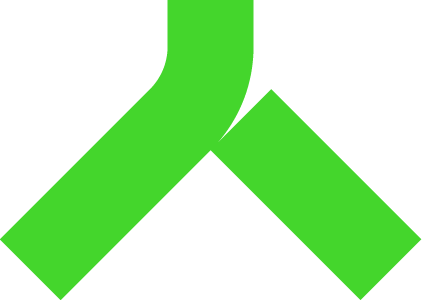
- Divisions: Apex Legends; Chess; Counter-Strike 2; The Finals; Naraka: Bladepoint; Marvel Snap; PUBG Mobile
- Founded: 2013
- Location: Gothenburg, Västergötland, Sweden
- Colors: Dark green, team green, light green
- Managing director: Kelly Ong (CSO)
- Manager: Jonathan "Loda" Berg; Henrik "AdmiralBulldog" Ahnberg; Joakim "Akke" Akterhall; Jerry "EGM" Lundkvist; Adam "Armada" Lindgren; Luqmanul "Scythe" Hakim
- Partners: Monster Energy; TEAM RAZER; Twitch; BYBIT; GG.Bet newzoo socios.com vbet CelcomDigi
- Website: thealliance.gg

Alliance is a professional gaming and esports organization based in Sweden that was formed in April 2013.

In December 2016, the organisation announced that it had become player-owned after parting with its parent organisation, GoodGame agency which was owned by Amazon through its subsidiary Twitch. The Dota 2 team won The International 2013, then the largest single prize money payout in esports history. The League of Legends team is one of the five teams that won a season of European League of Legends Championship Series with Fnatic, G2 Esports, Mad Lions and Rogue.

== History ==
The organization was founded in April 2013, picking up the Dota 2 team No Tidehunter as well as StarCraft II player Naniwa.

The organization expanded into League of Legends in December 2013, which competed in European League of Legends Championship Series. They entered Super Smash Bros. in November 2014 with the signing of Armada, a Fox and Peach player.

Alliance left StarCraft II in July 2014 with the release of their last player, SortOf. The League of Legends team was rebranded as Elements in January 2015 due to the team ownership rules in the League of Legends Championship Series preventing GoodGame Agency from owning multiple teams.

On 12 December 2016, Twitch spun Evil Geniuses and Alliance into player-owned organizations. According to Alliance member Jonathan Berg, all original members in addition to Armada got a percentage of the company.

In April 2024, the team underwent rebranding, leaning into the color green in their visual branding and introducing a new stylized "A" logo. They also introduced Rattio, an anthropomorphic rat as their new mascot.

== Dota 2 ==
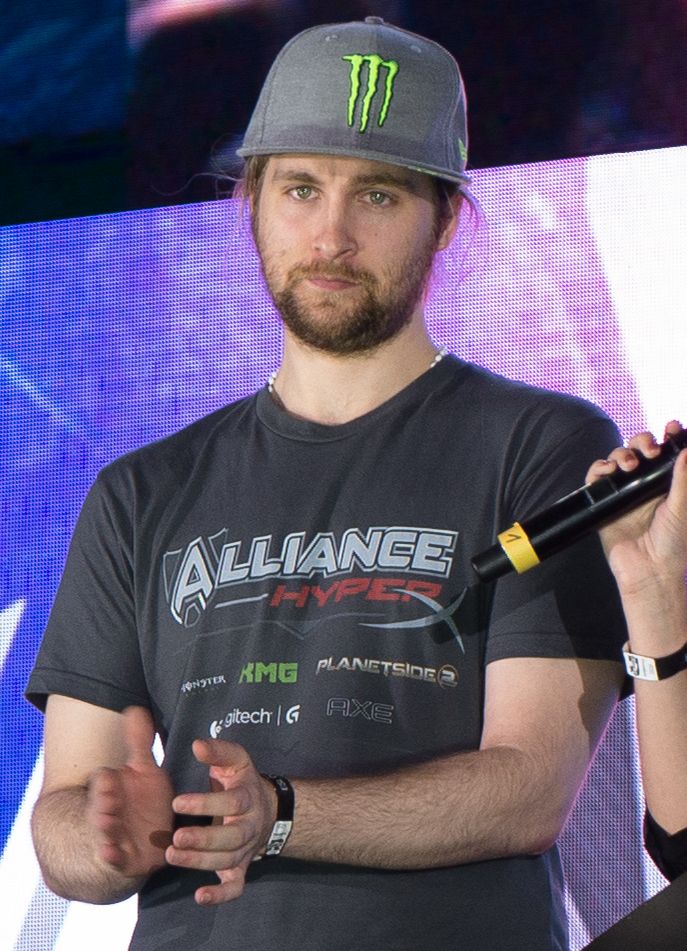
Then player, now manager Loda at ESL One Frankfurt 2014

A few months after being picked up by Alliance, the Dota 2 team won The International 2013, defeating former TI champions Natus Vincere in the grand finals 3–2. The team finished the group stages with a perfect 14–0 record, and only lost 3 games throughout the whole tournament (losing 1 game to Team DK, and the aforementioned 2 games to Na'Vi).

At The International 2014, the defending champions failed to make it out of the group stages, finishing tied for 11th place with a 6–9 record. After the tournament, their long stable roster fell apart, with the departure of Gustav "s4" Magnusson, Henrik "AdmiralBulldog" Ahnberg, and Jerry "EGM" Lundkvist.

While Starladder i-League is ongoing, Alliance announce the departure of MyNuts and use Kebap as a substitute in the series against Virtus.Pro

The team welcomes their previous teammate EGM back to Alliance

They would go on to win both WCA, the biggest prize pool event that was not directed by Valve, beating LGD in a best of 5; with a score of 3–2. Following this they went to Starladder almost missing the tournament due to weather complications. Despite a rocky start the team beat out TI reigning champions Evil Geniuses 2–0 in a best of three in the final. After their back to back victories at lans the team decided to drop out of the upcoming tournaments and focus on the Shanghai Major.

The team split up after the sixth rendition of the International, which resulted in AdmiralBulldog retiring to pursue streaming full-time, and Akke retiring to pursue a career in programing and S4 joining OG. S4 went on to win the Boston Major and the Kiev major, after leaving Alliance for OG.

The post TI6-shuffle squad featured former Ninjas in Pajamas players Limmp, Handsken and Jonassomfan as well as Loda and EGM. This squad had mediocre success failing to qualify for any major events during the TI6-TI7 season; ultimately leading to EGM being kicked on the last day of the "Drop period" before TI7 rosters had to be locked. They picked up Pablo as his replacement. After The International 2017, for which Alliance did not qualify, the team announced that they would part ways with its players Simon “Handsken” Haag, Linus “Limmp” Blomdin and Jonas “jonassomfan” Lindholm.

On April 10, 2023, the Alliance Cybersports organization announced on its official website that the Alliance.LATAM lineup playing in the South American DPC has left the organization.

== League of Legends ==
The Alliance League of Legends team formed in December 2013, and was granted the spot vacated by Evil Geniuses in the European League of Legends Championship Series due to Evil Geniuses moving to the North American LCS.

=== 2014 ===
In the Spring Split, Alliance finished 3rd in the regular season with a 16–12 record, behind SK Gaming and Fnatic. Alliance mid-laner Henrik “Froggen” Hansen was voted as the MVP of the Spring Split with 28% of the vote. In the playoffs, they finished 4th, losing to Fnatic in the semifinals 2–1, then lost to ROCCAT 2–0 in the 3rd place game.

In the Summer Split, Alliance topped the regular season standings with a 21–7 record. They then won the playoffs with a 3–1 over Fnatic in the finals, giving the team a spot in the 2014 League of Legends World Championship. At the World Championship, Alliance finished 3rd in their group, failing to advance to the knockout stage. The team was upset by Brazilian team KaBuM! e-Sports, which denied them a chance to play in a tiebreaker for a chance to progress to the knockout stage.

At Intel Extreme Masters San Jose, the team was eliminated by Cloud9.

The team picked up Martin "Rekkles" Larsson on 24 November 2014. After a Riot Games rules change concerning sponsorship, Alliance LoL left the organization and rebranded itself as Elements.

=== 2015 ===
Elements was created in January 2015 from the League of Legends roster of Alliance after rebranding itself due to a new sale of sponsorships rule established after the 2014 season. The initial starting roster of Elements included Wickd, Shook, Froggen, Rekkles, and Nyph.

After a 4–4 record at the end of the fourth week of the spring split, Elements replaced Wickd with former Millenium top laner Kevin "kev1n" Rubiszewski. In the sixth week of the split they replaced Nyph with former Evil Geniuses support Krepo, who had previously played with Froggen on CLG.EU and EG. Nyph stayed in the team as an assistant coach. One week later, Wickd returned to the toplane position while kev1n became a sub. Nyph replaced Mart as the new head coach, joining the team during the picks and bans.

Elements went 7–11 in the EU Spring LCS regular season to finish 7th, failing to make the playoffs.

Rekkles left the team in April and was replaced at AD Carry by Erik “Tabzz” Van Helvert.

Elements changed four of the players on the roster for the Summer 2015 Split.

In early May 2016, German football club FC Schalke 04 bought Element's LCS spot.

In late 2024 Alliance participated in the Wildz Invitational run by Rootz Ltd.

== Rosters ==
Alliance rosters

Apex Legends
Handle	Name	Nationality
Hakis	Håkansson, John	Sweden
Akku	Schneeberger, Jan	Germany
Unlucky	Türk, Andre	Austria

Chess
Handle	Name	Nationality
annamaja	Kazarian, Anna-Maja	Netherlands

Counter-Strike 2
Handle	Name	Nationality
eraa	Knutsson, Sean	Sweden
upE	Johansson, Markus	Sweden
twist	Eliasson, Simon	Sweden
bobeksde	Persson, Jonatan	Sweden
avid	Åberg, Arvid	Sweden

Naraka: Bladepoint
Handle	Name	Nationality
Revenge	Chen Yixun
Lian	Luo Zixiao
Bo	Chen Bo
Froztivus	Wicaksana Setyawan, Darian

Marvel Snap
Handle	Name	Nationality
Lowel	Fitas, Joaquin

PUBG Mobile
Handle	Name	Nationality
JimmyOP	Kamarudin, Muhammad Hazim Irfan	Malaysia
Oliyo	Amran, Mohammad Azli	Malaysia
AdikLuq	Hakim Hasan, Luqman	Malaysia
LeonDZ	Dzuliansyah, Leon	Indonesia
Iftar (L)	Syahmi, Muhammad Faris	Malaysia
Xynboy	Nor Hazlin, Hazril Aqif	Malaysia

Legend:
- (I) Inactive
- (S) Suspended
- (L) On loan
- (2W) Two-way player
- Substitute
- (injured) Injury / Illness

Source: Alliance

Awards and achievements
Preceded by Invictus Gaming	The International winner 2013; With: Loda, s4, AdmiralBulldog, EGM, Akke	Succeeded by Newbee
Preceded by Fnatic	League of Legends European Championship winner Summer 2015	Succeeded by Fnatic
