= The International (esports) =

Annual Dota 2 world championship

- Game: Dota 2
- Founded: 2011; 15 years ago
- Administrator: Valve; PGL
- No. of teams: 16 teams (2011–2016, 2024–present); 18 teams (2017–2021); 20 teams (2022–2023)
- Most recent champion: Team Spirit (2026)
- Most titles: Team Spirit (3)
- Tournament format: Group stage; Single round-robin; Main event; Double elimination
- Website: dota2.com/esports

The International (TI) is an annual esports world championship for the five-on-five video game Dota 2. Produced by the game's developer Valve, it serves as the culminating event of the professional Dota 2 season and currently features 16 teams. The International was first held in Germany at the 2011 Gamescom to promote the game's release. It was then held in Seattle, where Valve is headquartered, until it began to be hosted internationally again starting with The International 2018 in Vancouver.

The tournament's prize pool has been crowdfunded via transactions within the game since 2013, with a quarter of all revenue from it directly going towards it. Internationals have the largest single-tournament prize pool of any esport event, with its largest reaching US$40 million in 2021. The most recent champion is Team Spirit, who won The International 2026 for the third time. OG, and Team Liquid each have also won two Internationals since its inception.

== History ==
=== Early years ===
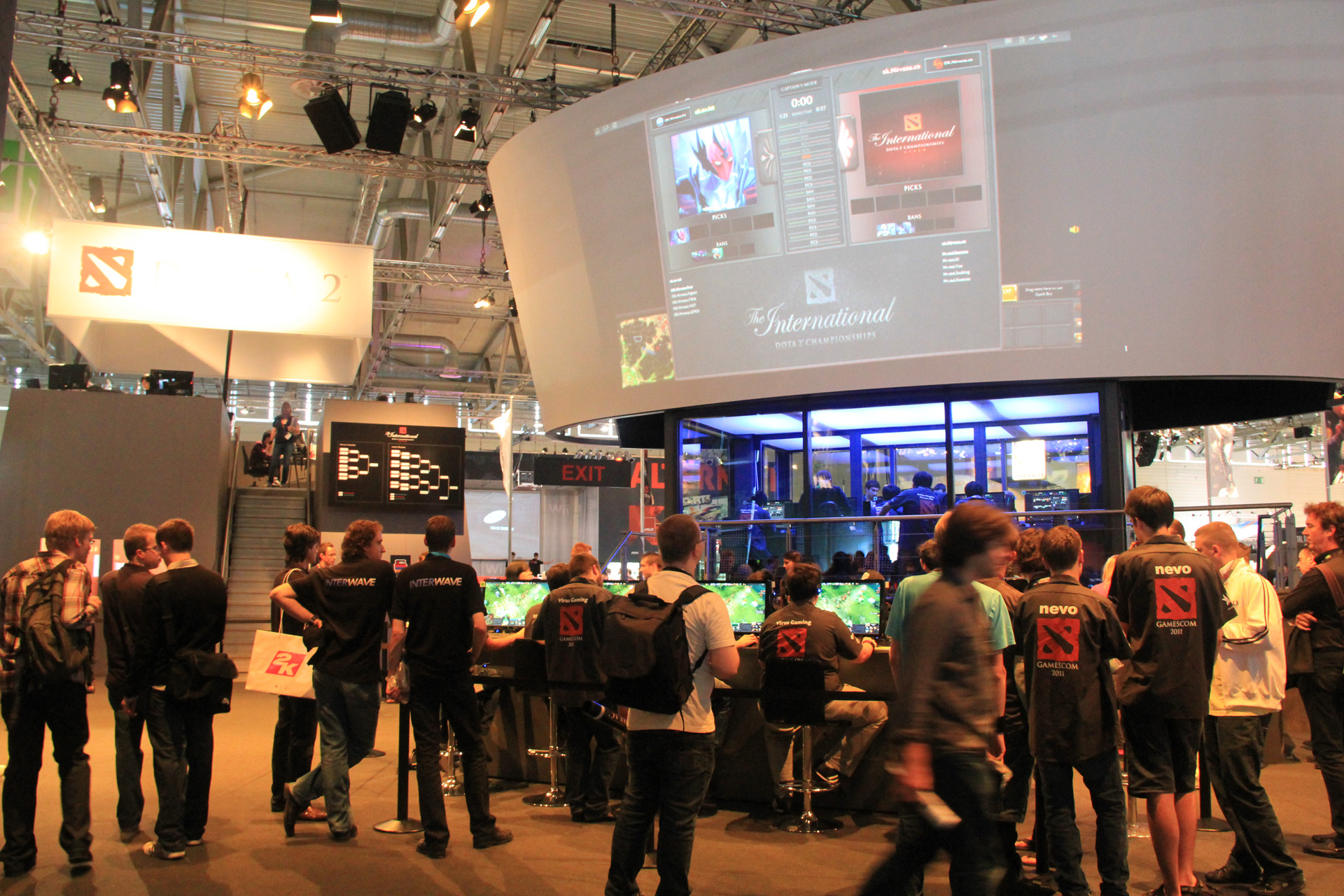
The first International was held at Gamescom in 2011.

Valve announced the first edition of The International on August 1, 2011. 16 teams were invited to compete in the tournament, which would also serve as the first public viewing of Dota 2. The tournament was funded by Valve, including the US$1 million grand prize, with Nvidia supplying the hardware. It took place at Gamescom in Cologne from August 17–21 the same year. The tournament started with a group stage in which the winners of each of the four groups were entered into a winner's bracket, and the other teams entered the loser's bracket. The rest of the tournament was then played as a double-elimination tournament. The final of this inaugural tournament was between Ukrainian-based Natus Vincere and Chinese-based EHOME, with Natus Vincere winning the series 3–1. EHOME won US$250,000, with the rest of the 14 teams splitting the remaining $350,000.

The International as a recurring annual event was confirmed in May 2012. The International 2012 was held at the 2,500 seat Benaroya Hall in Seattle from August 31 to September 2, with teams situated in glass booths on the main stage. The total prize pool remained at $1.6 million, with $1 million for the winning team. The previous winners, Natus Vincere, were beaten 3–1 by Chinese team Invictus Gaming in the grand finals. In November 2012, Valve released a free documentary on the event that featured interviews with the teams, and following them from the preliminary stages through to the finale.

=== Introduction of crowdfunding ===
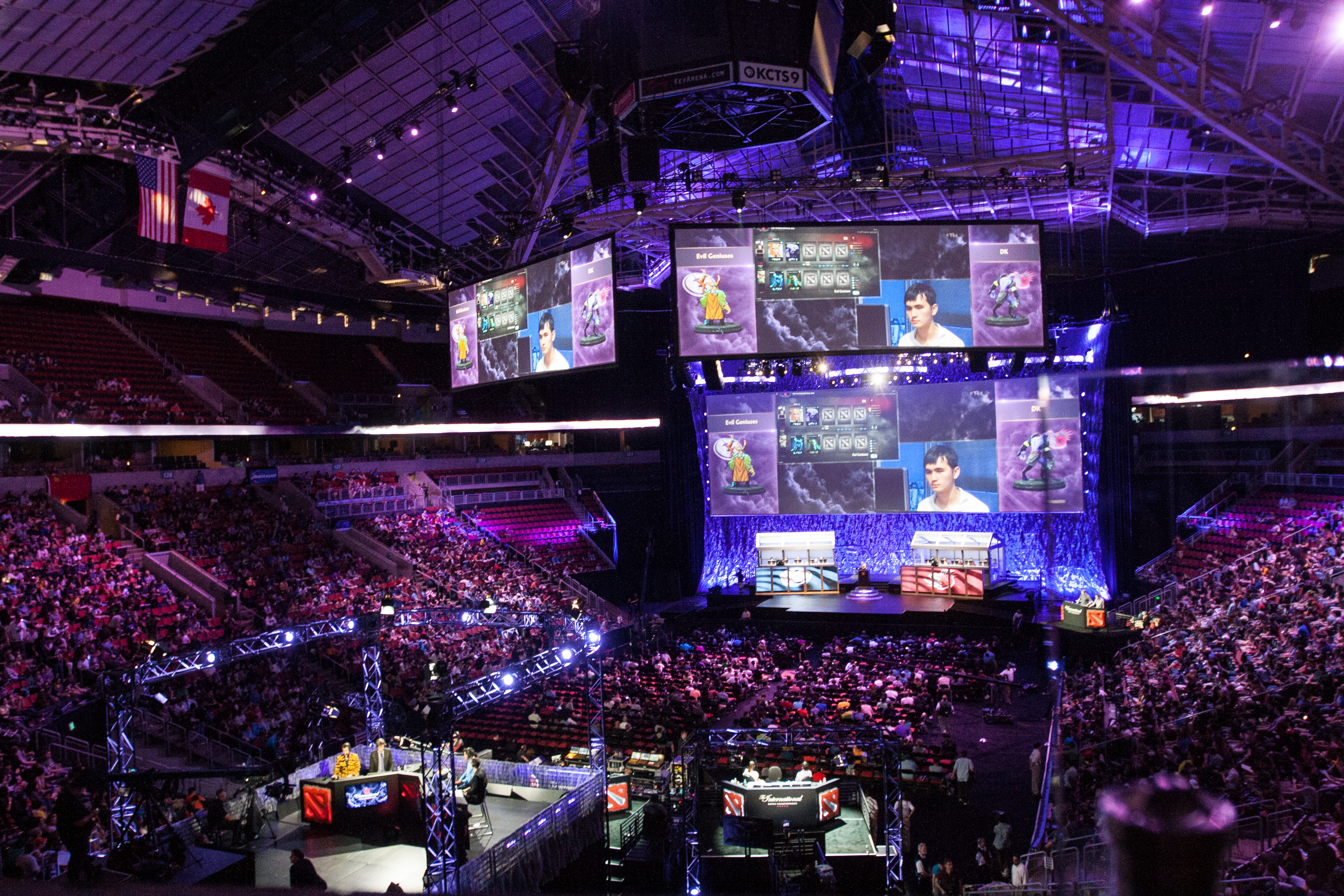
The International 2014 at the KeyArena in Seattle

The International 2013 was hosted again at the Benaroya Hall in Seattle from August 7–11. Sixteen teams participated, thirteen of which received direct invitations, and the final three being decided in two qualifying tournaments and a match at the start of the tournament. In May 2013, it was announced that an in-game battle pass, known as the Compendium, would be available for purchase that allowed for the tournament's prize pool to be crowdfunded. A quarter of the total revenue from the Compendium was added to the base $1.6 million prize pool. The prize pool eventually reached over $2.8 million, making it the largest prize pool in esports history at the time. KCPQ news anchor Kaci Aitchison acted as a host at the event, providing behind-the-scenes commentary and player interviews. The International 2013 was viewed by over a million concurrent viewers at its peak, via live streaming websites such as Twitch.

The International 2014 took place from July 18–21 at the KeyArena in Seattle. For the event, eleven teams would receive direct invites, with an additional four spots determined by regional qualifiers taking place between May 12–25. The sixteenth spot would be determined by a wild card qualifier between the runners-up from the regional competitions. The tickets for the event were sold out within an hour of going on sale that April. The tournament's crowdfunded prize pool again broke esport records for being the largest in history, with it totalling over $10.9 million. As a result, eight Dota 2 players became the highest earning players in esports, surpassing the top earning player at the time, Lee "Jaedong" Jae-dong of StarCraft. The event was also broadcast on ESPN networks for the first time.

In April 2015, Valve announced the introduction of the Dota Major Championships, a series of four annual tournaments, one for each season. The Fall, Winter and Spring Majors were sponsored by Valve but organized by third-party hosts at various international locations, while the Summer event was the International. This format was first implemented for the 2015–2016 season, featuring the Frankfurt Major, the Shanghai Major and the Manila Major, culminating in The International 2016. In the subsequent 2016–2017 season, the number of Major tournaments was reduced to three: the Boston Major, the Kiev Major and The International 2017. Starting with The International 2017, the total number of participating teams was increased from 16 to 18.

=== Dota Pro Circuit ===
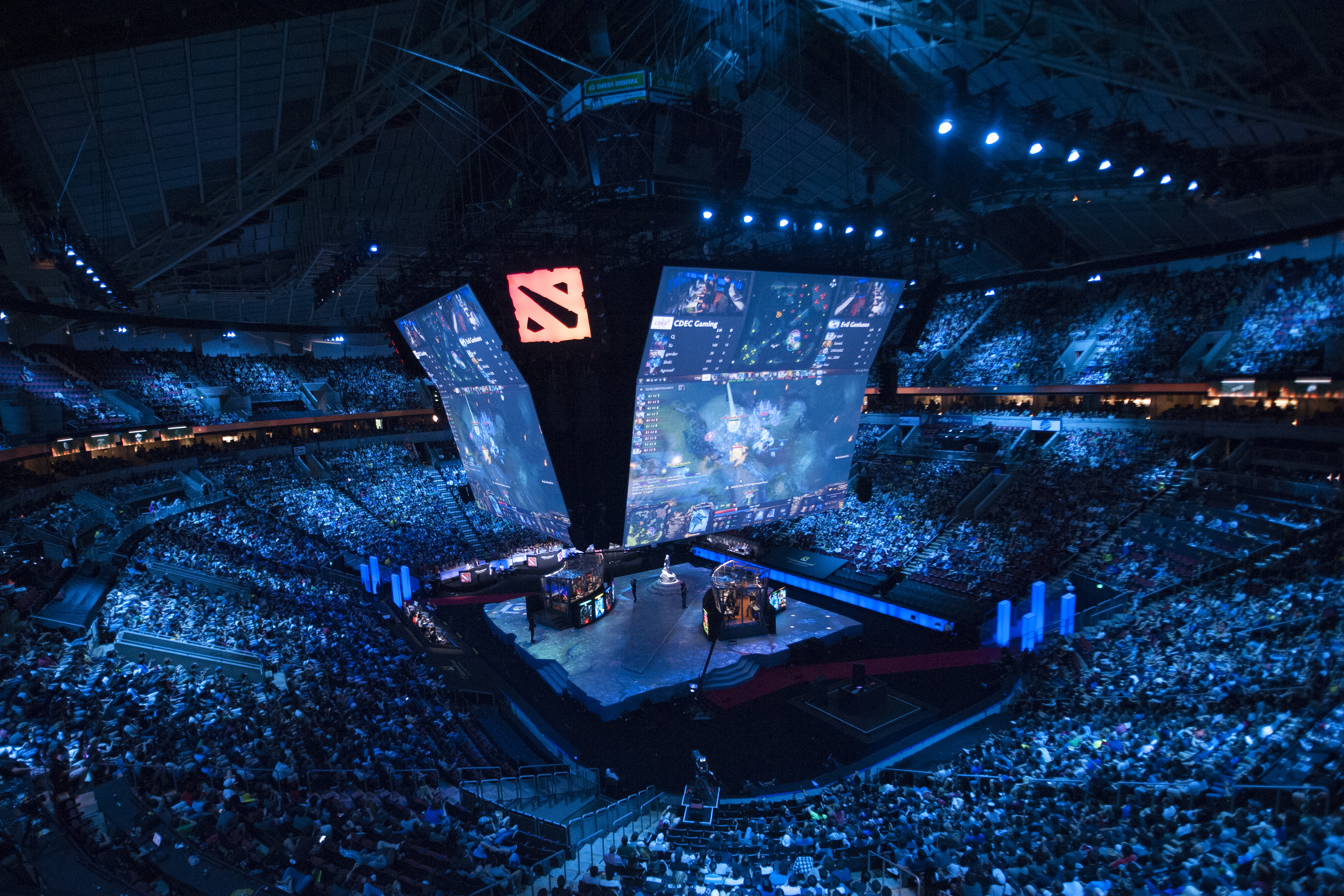
The International 2015 grand final in the KeyArena in Seattle

For the 2017–2018 season, Valve introduced the Dota Pro Circuit, a series of tournaments awarding qualifying points. The eight teams with the highest point totals at the end of the season received direct invitations to The International 2018, while another ten teams qualified via regional qualifier tournaments. The circuit was implemented to provide more "clarity and transparency" in the selection process for direct invites. Over the course of the 2017–2018 season, the Dota Pro Circuit comprised nine Majors (excluding The International 2018) and 13 Minors.

The International 2020 was the first International to skip a year, as it was postponed due to the COVID-19 pandemic. Ahead of the event, originally scheduled to be held in Stockholm, Sweden, the Swedish Sports Federation voted to deny recognition of esports as a sporting event, making it difficult for Valve to help international players to secure travel visas for participating there. Valve later rescheduled the event and rebranded it as The International 2021, which was held at the Arena Națională in Bucharest, Romania, in October 2021. It set a record for the largest prize pool of any single esports event at $40 million.

The International 2022 increased to 20 teams and was held in Singapore in October 2022, where it was won by Tundra Esports. It was the first International to not surpass the previous one's prize pool at $18.9 million, the lowest since The International 2015. The International 2023 was hosted at Climate Pledge Arena in Seattle, which was built at the same site as KeyArena, and ran from October 27 to 29. In September, Valve had announced that the 2023 season would mark the end of the Dota Pro Circuit.

== List of Internationals ==
Year	Location	Venue	Champion	Finals	Runner-up	Teams	Prize pool
2011	Cologne	Koelnmesse	Natus Vincere	3–1	EHOME	16	$1,600,000
2012	Seattle	Benaroya Hall	Invictus Gaming	3–1	Natus Vincere	16	$1,600,000
2013	Seattle	Benaroya Hall	Alliance	3–2	Natus Vincere	16	$2,874,380
2014	Seattle	KeyArena	Newbee	3–1	Vici Gaming	16	$10,923,977
2015	Seattle	KeyArena	Evil Geniuses	3–1	CDEC Gaming	16	$18,429,613
2016	Seattle	KeyArena	Wings Gaming	3–1	Digital Chaos	16	$20,770,460
2017	Seattle	KeyArena	Team Liquid	3–0	Newbee	18	$24,787,916
2018	Vancouver	Rogers Arena	OG	3–2	PSG.LGD	18	$25,532,177
2019	Shanghai	Mercedes-Benz Arena	OG	3–1	Team Liquid	18	$34,330,068
~~2020~~	Stockholm	Ericsson Globe	Cancelled due to the COVID-19 pandemic				
2021	Bucharest	Arena Națională	Team Spirit	3–2	PSG.LGD	18	$40,018,195
2022	Singapore	Suntec Singapore	Tundra Esports	3–0	Team Secret	20	$18,930,775
2022	Singapore	Singapore Indoor Stadium	Tundra Esports	3–0	Team Secret	20	$18,930,775
2023	Seattle	Seattle Convention Center	Team Spirit	3–0	Gaimin Gladiators	20	$3,143,063
2023	Seattle	Climate Pledge Arena	Team Spirit	3–0	Gaimin Gladiators	20	$3,143,063
2024	Copenhagen	Royal Arena	Team Liquid	3–0	Gaimin Gladiators	16	$2,602,164
2025	Hamburg	Barclays Arena	Team Falcons	3–2	Xtreme Gaming	16	$2,881,791
2026	Shanghai	Oriental Sports Center	Team Spirit	3–2	Team Vision	16	$3,906,263

== Format ==
=== Qualification and tournament format ===
With the exception of the inaugural edition, in which all teams were invited, subsequent tournaments have featured a mixed qualification process. A portion of the participating teams receive direct invitations, typically based on their performance throughout the year, while the remaining slots are filled through qualifier tournaments. The main tournament typically begins with a group stage conducted in a round-robin format, followed by a main event structured as a double-elimination bracket.

=== Prize pool ===
Since The International 2013, the tournament's prize pool is primarily crowdfunded through a battle pass called the Compendium, which raises money from players buying them to get exclusive in-game virtual goods and other bonuses. 25% of all the revenue made from yearly Compendiums go directly to the prize pool. The contribution of players from the game community is the main source of prize pool for the International. Until 2022, each iteration of The International has surpassed the previous one's prize pool. The International 2021 had the largest prize pool, awarding $40 million (£29 million) in total to participating teams. Prize pools began to decline by the mid-2020s; The International 2024 had the smallest since the introduction of crowdfunding at $2,602,164.

=== Trophy ===
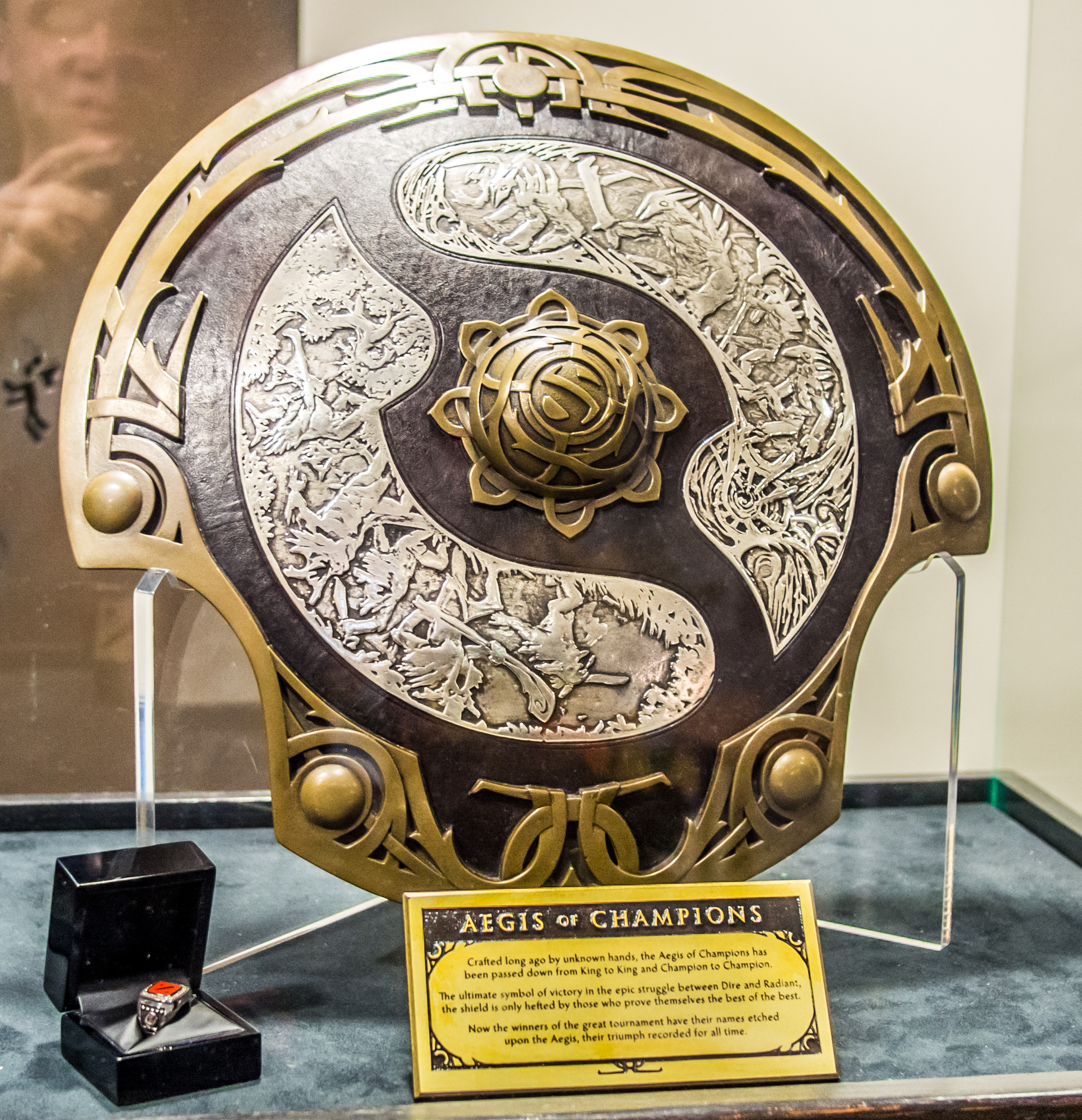
The Aegis of Champions trophy

The Aegis of Champions is a trophy that is awarded to the champions of an International. The reverse side of it is permanently engraved with the names of each player on the winning team. The Aegis is a shield inspired by Norse and Chinese designs, with it molded in bronze and silver by the prop studio, Weta Workshop. Miniature replicas of it are also sometimes awarded to compendium owners for having a high enough level in it.

== Media coverage ==
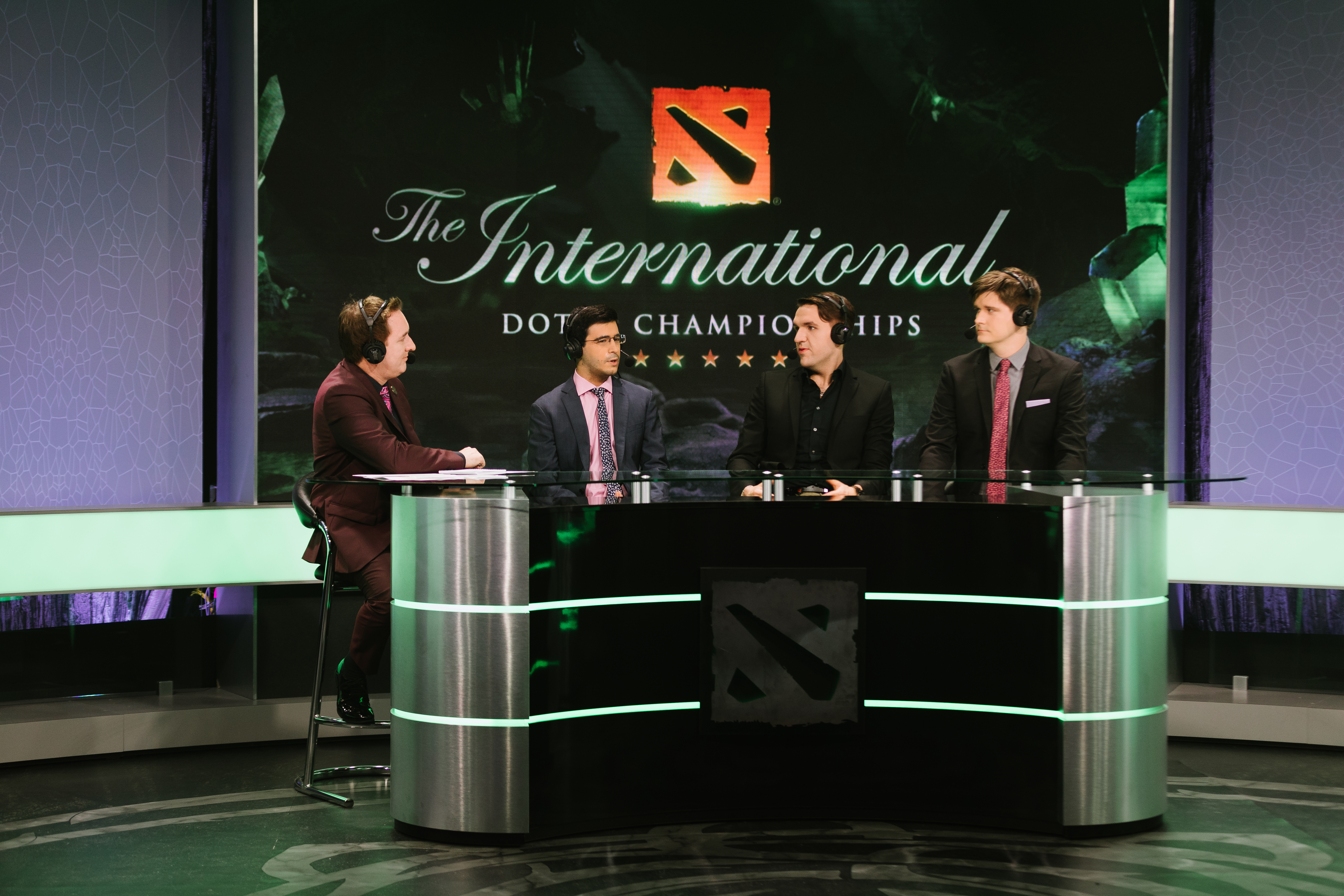
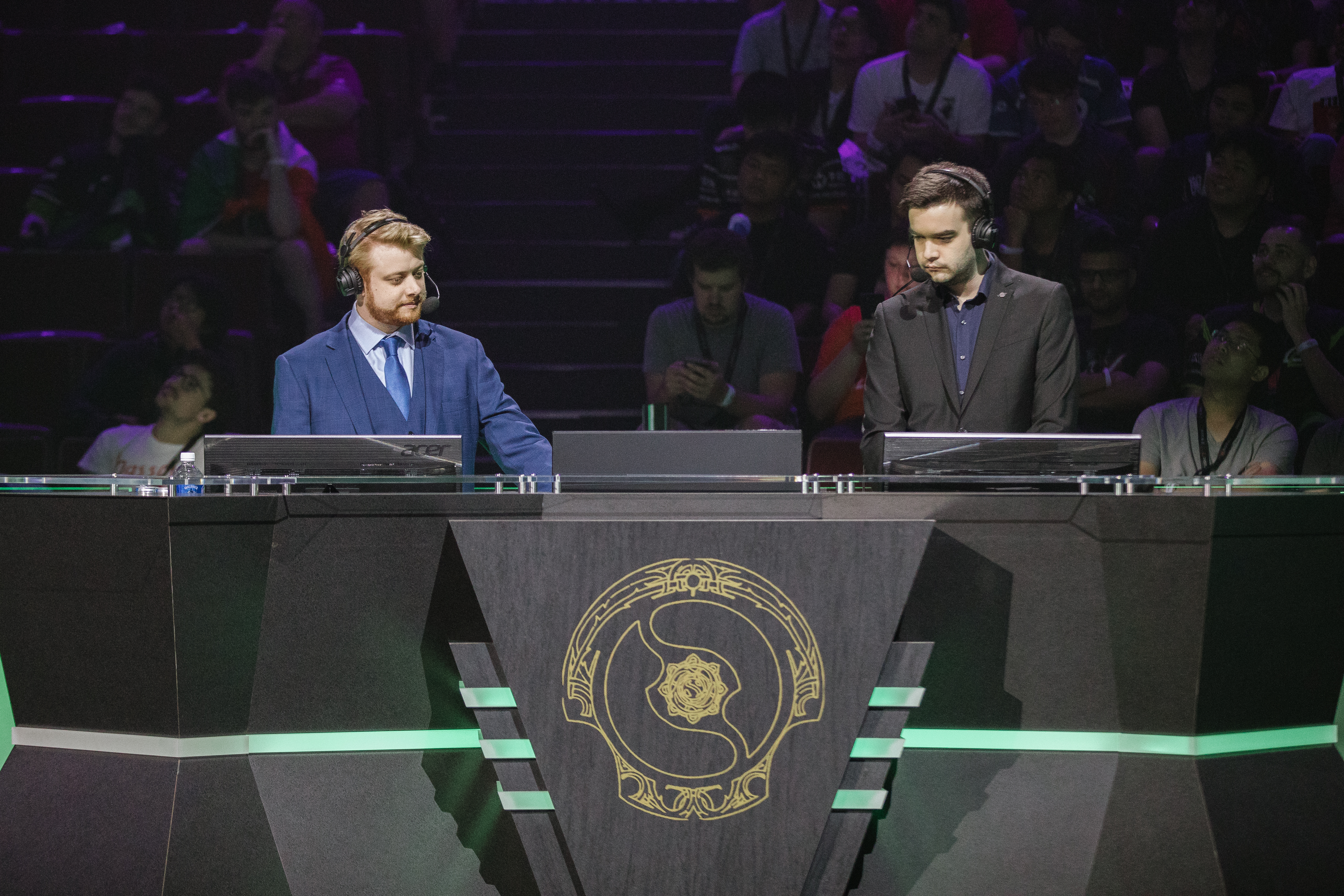
As with traditional sporting events, The International feature pre- and post-game discussion by a panel of analysts (left), with in-match casting being done by play-by-play and color commentators (right).

The primary medium for International coverage is through the video game live streaming platform Twitch, which is done by a selection of dedicated esports organizations and personnel who provide on-site commentary, analysis, match predictions, and player interviews surrounding the event in progress, similar to traditional sporting events. Multiple streams are provided in a variety of languages, mainly in English, Russian, and Chinese. The International also sometimes provides a "newcomer stream" that is dedicated to presenting games for viewers unfamiliar with the game.

=== Documentaries ===
In 2014, Valve released a free documentary, Free to Play, which followed three players during their time at the first International in 2011. In 2016, Valve began producing an episodic-based documentary series titled True Sight, considered a spiritual successor to Free to Play. Several more episodes of it have been filmed, showcasing the 2017, 2018, 2019, and 2021 tournaments. However, True Sight was discontinued after the 2022 tournament.
