= The International 2014 =

2014 esports tournament

Tournament information
- Game: Dota 2
- Location: Seattle, Washington, U.S.
- Dates: July 18–21, 2014
- Administrator: Valve
- Tournament format(s): Group stage Round robin Main event Double elimination
- Venue(s): KeyArena
- Participants: 16 teams
- Purse: $10,923,977

Final positions
- Champions: (China) Newbee (1st title)
- 1st runner-up: (China) Vici Gaming
- 2nd runner-up: (United States) Evil Geniuses

The International 2014 (TI4) was the fourth edition of The International, an annual esports Dota 2 championship tournament, which took place at the KeyArena in Seattle. Hosted by Valve, the tournament began on July 8 with the Playoffs phase and closed on July 21 with the Grand Final. The 2014 edition of The International featured nineteen Dota 2 professional gaming teams that competed for a Grand Prize of over US$5.0 million. Overall, US$10.93 million were awarded at the event, making it the largest esports event by prize money until it was topped by the next International.

The championship used a double-elimination tournament. The current format put teams against each other on a best-of-three basis, with winners and losers moving onto two brackets (Upper and Lower) for the knockout stage. The Grand Final was decided on a best-of-five match.

All previously winning teams were invited to the event. Defending champions Alliance were eliminated on Phase Two of the Playoffs, while 2011 and 2012 winners Natus Vincere and Invictus Gaming were eliminated during the Lower Bracket's Round One. The tournament was broadcast on streaming platform Twitch as well as ESPN3. ESPN2 broadcast a preview of the Grand Final, which was disputed between Chinese teams ViCi Gaming and NewBee. The latter won 3–1, becoming the second Chinese team to win the tournament after Invictus Gaming. It was the first Grand Final that was between two teams from Asia, as well as the first time Natus Vincere was not a participant.

== History ==
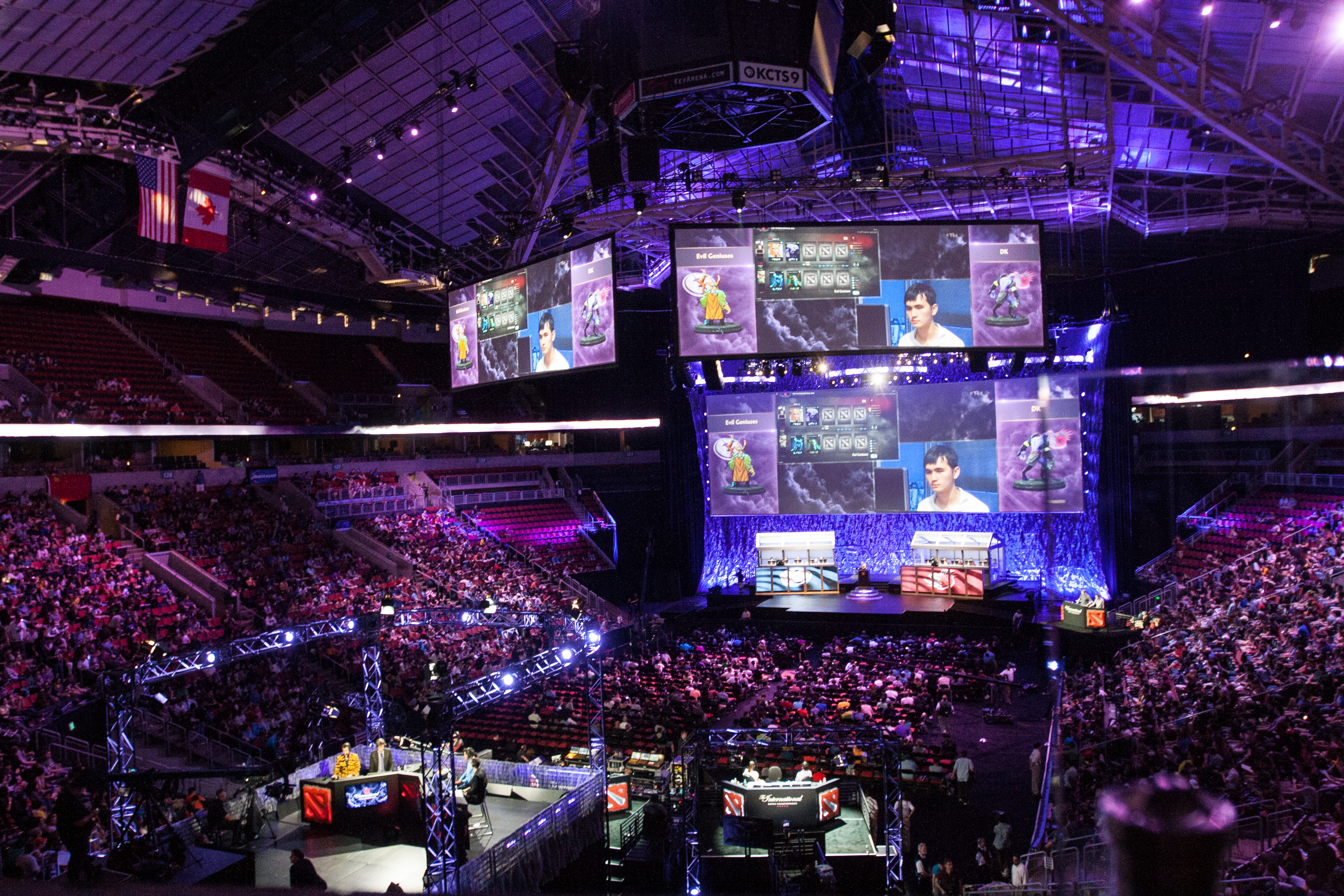
The first day of The International 2014 at KeyArena

The International 2014 was announced by Valve in March 2014 to be taking place in the new venue of KeyArena in Seattle. The 10,000 tickets went on sale soon after and sold out within an hour of going on sale. Eleven teams automatically qualified for the event, with four further places being played for in regional qualifiers and one place played for in playoffs made up of the regional runners-up.

Valve again revealed an interactive compendium book for the tournament. A quarter of its revenue went towards the tournament's overall prize pool. When certain prize pool milestones were met, rewards were unlocked, including a new Dota 2 game mode and visuals. Eleven days after the compendium went on sale the prize pool had been increased from Valve's $1.6 million to over $6 million, with all the rewards having been unlocked. By June the total prize pool reached over $10 million, the biggest electronic sports prize pool in history and a larger prize pool than both the Super Bowl and 2014 Masters Tournament.

In June, two of the invited Asian teams, CIS Game and Arrow Gaming, announced they had been denied entry visas to the United States to compete in the tournament but would be applying again. Arrow Gaming later received their visa and after 3 denied attempts CIS Game received theirs. The tournament was streamed on the Twitch streaming website with a number of different channels showing different languages, multiple games, and a stream aimed at new players.

== Qualification ==
11 teams around the world were directly invited to participate in the tournament, while 41 teams were invited to the qualifiers. The qualifiers were split into four regions: Americas, China, Europe and South-East Asia. Four winners of their respective regional qualifiers joined the directly invited teams in Phase Two, while four runners-up of their respective regional qualifiers continued to Phase One to fight for the last spot in Phase Two.

Natus Vincere America edged out fellow Americans Team Liquid in the Americas qualifier to earn their spot, while Malaysian team Arrow Gaming came out victorious against Koreans MVP Phoenix for the South-East Asian spot. LGD Gaming defeated CIS Game to become the fifth Chinese representative as German team Mousesports turned around against Russian team Virtus Pro to claim the European spot.

== Teams ==
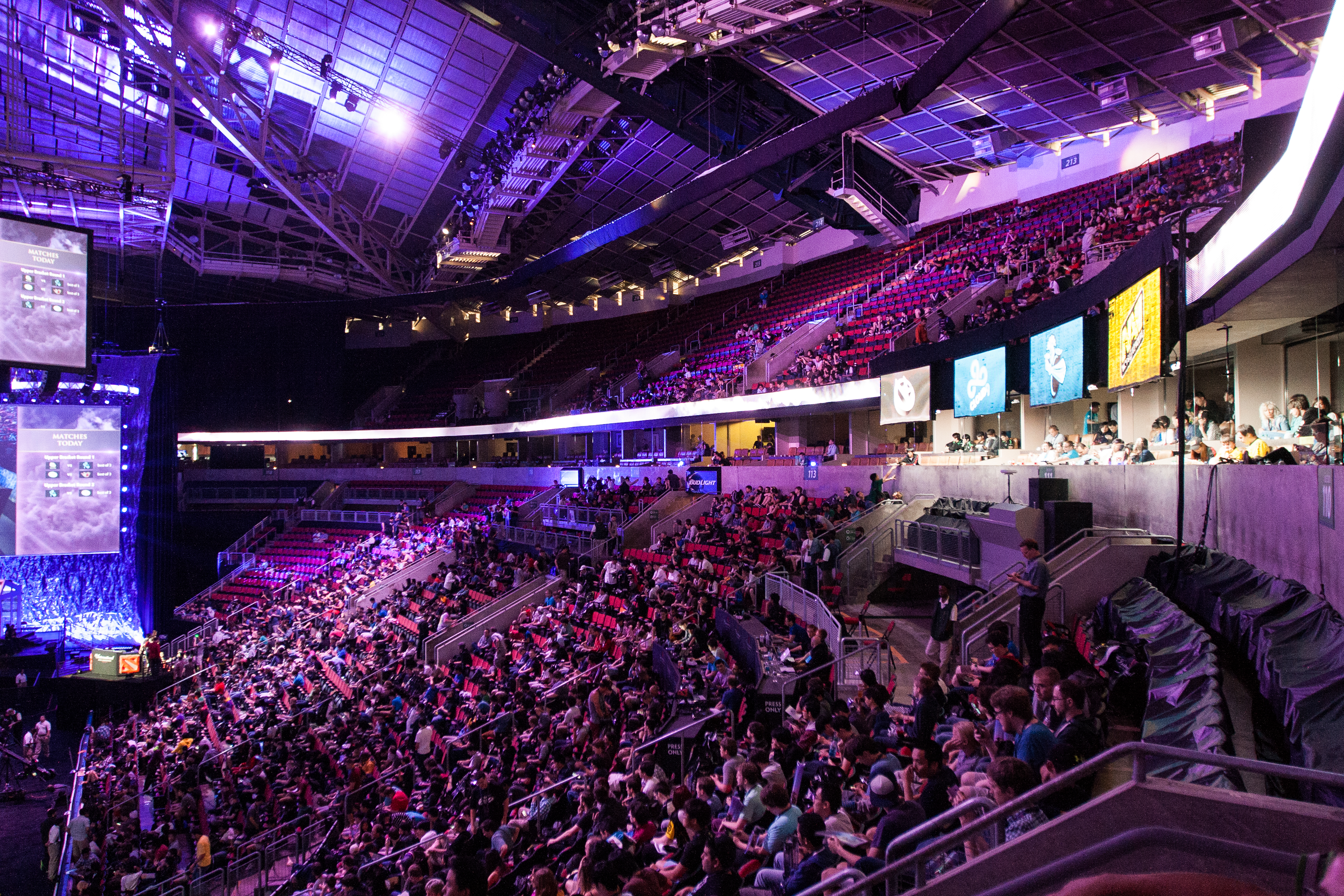
The crowd at The International 2014

A total nineteen professional teams from across the globe were invited to the event:

Direct invitation

- (Sweden) Alliance
- (United States) Evil Geniuses
- (China) Invictus Gaming
- (Ukraine) Natus Vincere
- (Malaysia) Titan
- (Europe) Fnatic
- (China) NewBee
- (China) ViCi Gaming
- (China) Team DK
- (United Nations) Cloud9
- (Russia) Team Empire

Regional qualifier winners

- (United States) Natus Vincere America (Americas)
- (Malaysia) Arrow Gaming (Southeast Asia)
- LGD Gaming (China)
- (Germany) Mousesports (Europe)

Wild card teams

- (United States) Team Liquid (Americas runner-up)
- (South Korea) MVP Phoenix (Southeast Asia runner-up)
- CIS Game (China runner-up)
- (Russia) Virtus.Pro (Europe runner-up)

== Results ==
Place	Team	Prize Money
1	(China) NewBee	$5,025,029
2	(China) ViCi Gaming	$1,466,898
3	(United States) Evil Geniuses	$1,032,262
4	(China) Team DK	$814,943
5-6	(China) LGD Gaming	$651,955
5-6	(European Union) Cloud9	$651,955
7-8	(China) Invictus Gaming	$516,131
7-8	(Ukraine) Natus Vincere	$516,131
9-10	(Malaysia) Titan	$48,897
9-10	(United States) Team Liquid	$48,897
11-12	(Germany) Mousesports	$38,031
11-12	(Sweden) Alliance	$38,031
13-14	(Europe) Fnatic	$21,732
13-14	(Russia) Team Empire	$21,732
15-16	(United States) Na'Vi North America	
15-16	(Malaysia) Arrow Gaming	
17	(South Korea) MVP Phoenix	
18-19	(Russia) Virtus.pro	
18-19	(China) CIS Game	

== Playoffs ==
Phase One of the playoffs for The International 2014 began on July 8, 2014, with teams Virtus.Pro, MVP, Liquid, and CIS Game competing for the last spot for the next phase. Phase Two of the playoffs was a round-robin group stage in which all 16 qualified teams played each other. The top two teams progressed straight to the main event's upper bracket, while the next eight teams entered a third playoff phase and the bottom six were eliminated. In Phase Three of the playoffs the eight teams who did not progress to the upper bracket and were not eliminated played to decide the six teams which would enter the upper and lower brackets, with two teams eliminated from the tournament.

=== Phase One ===
July 8, 2014

Round One
(Russia) Virtus.Pro	0
(South Korea) MVP Phoenix	2
(China) CIS Game	0
(United States) Team Liquid	2

Round Two
(South Korea) MVP Phoenix	0
(United States) Team Liquid	2

=== Phase Two ===
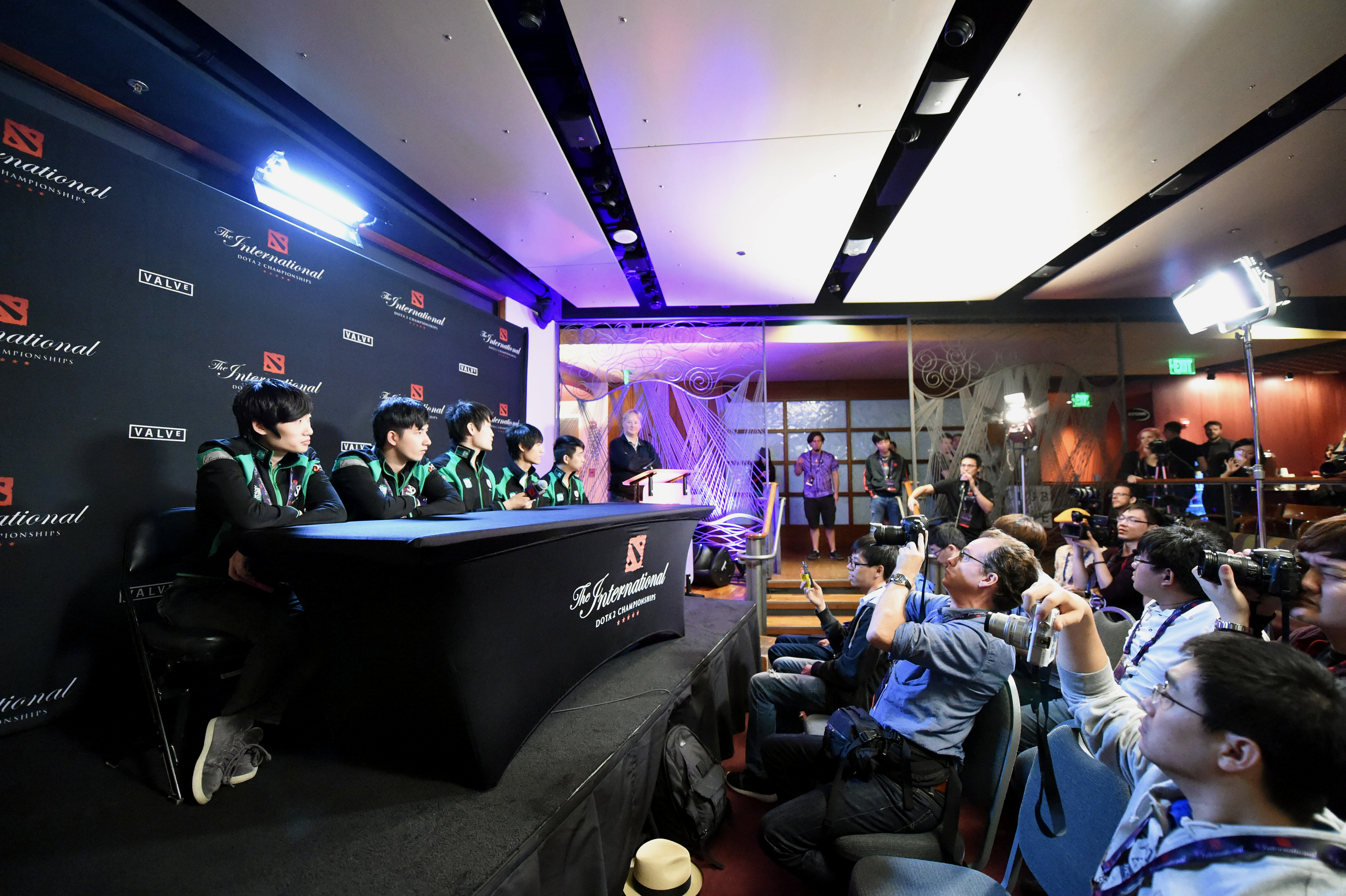
Vici Gaming during a press conference at The International 2014

July 9–12, 2014

Qualifies for Main Event's Upper Bracket
Qualifies for Phase 3's Round 3
Qualifies for Phase 3's Round 2
Qualifies for Phase 3's Round 1
Eliminated from the tournament

Pos	Team	Wins	Losses
1	(China) ViCi Gaming	12	3
2	(United States) Evil Geniuses	11	4
3	(China) Team DK	10	5
4	(China) Invictus Gaming	9	6
5	(Ukraine) Natus Vincere	8	7
6	(United Nations) Cloud9	8	7
7	(United States) Team Liquid	8	7
8	(Malaysia) Titan	8	7
9	(China) NewBee*	7	8
10	(China) LGD Gaming*	7	8
11	(Germany) Mousesports*	7	8
12	(Sweden) Alliance	6	9
13	(Russia) Team Empire	6	9
14	(Europe) Fnatic	6	9
15	(United States) Natus Vincere America	5	10
16	(Malaysia) Arrow Gaming	2	13

*NewBee, LGD Gaming and Mousesports ended on the same number of wins after the Round Robin, and hence required extra tiebreakers to be played. NewBee won both matches against LGD Gaming and Mousesports, hence taking 9th place. LGD Gaming took the victory against Mousesports, hence taking 10th place, while Mousesports takes the 11th place and was eliminated.

=== Phase Three ===
July 13, 2014

Match A
(United States) Team Liquid	0
(China) LGD Gaming	2

Match B
(United Nations) Cloud9	2
(China) LGD Gaming	1

Match C
(China) Team DK	2
(United Nations) Cloud9	0

Team DK advances to the Upper Bracket, Cloud9 and LGD Gaming advances to the Lower Bracket, Team Liquid is eliminated.

July 14, 2014

Match D
(Malaysia) Titan	1
(China) NewBee	2

Match E
(Ukraine) Natus Vincere	0
(China) NewBee	2

Match F
(China) Invictus Gaming	1
(China) NewBee	2

NewBee advances to the Upper Bracket, Invictus Gaming and Natus Vincere advances to the Lower Bracket, Titan is eliminated.

== Main event ==
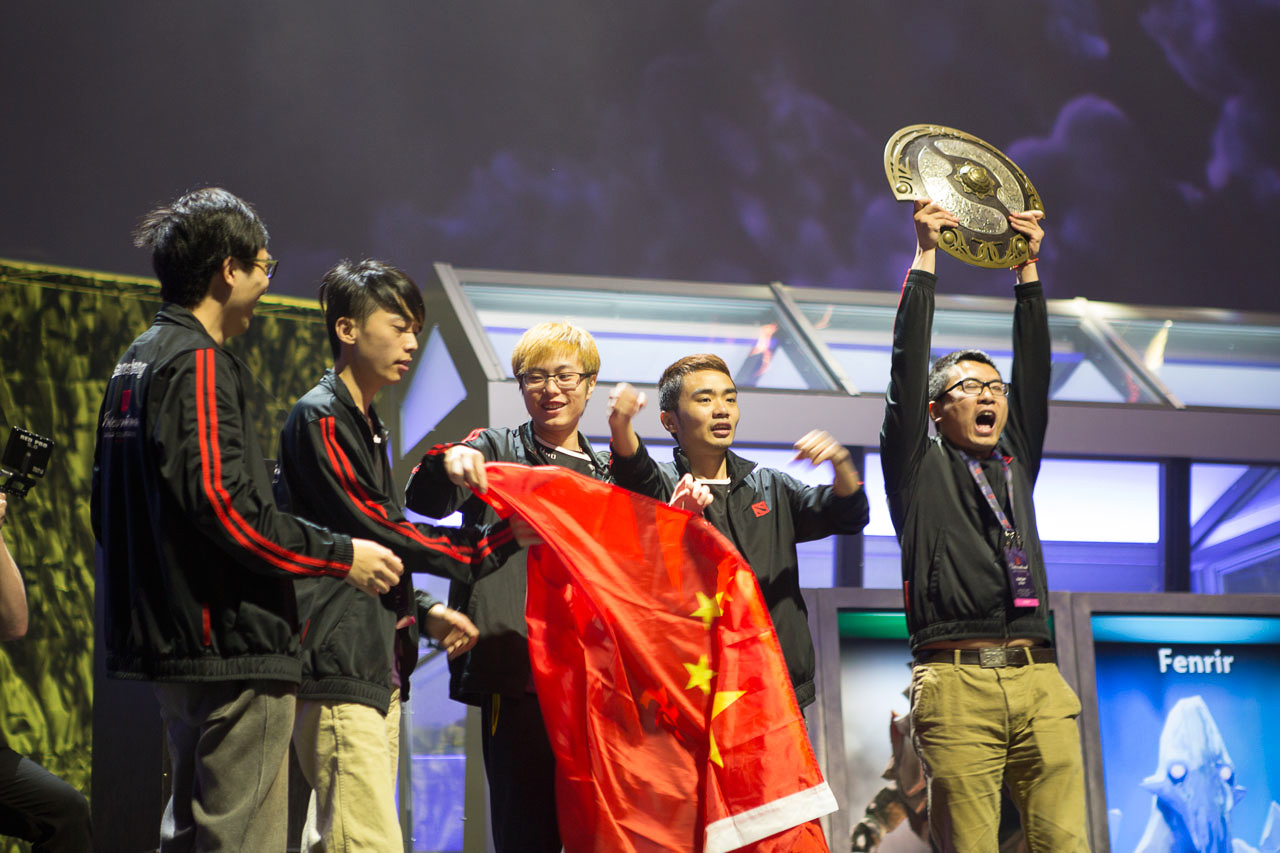
Winning team NewBee celebrating after the grand final

=== July 18: Upper Bracket (UB) ===
The Upper Bracket consisted of two rounds to decide one of the two teams to dispute the 2014 Grand Final. The first round comprised two matches between the top two teams of Phase Two against the two winners of Phase Three. Matches were decided on a best-of-three basis. The first match was held between Chinese teams ViCi and Newbee, with the latter winning 2–1. The second match was held between American team Evil Geniuses and Chinese team Team DK, with the former winning 2–0. The second round match for a place in the Grand Final was disputed by first round winners Newbee and Evil Geniuses; the match was won by the former with two straight victories.

=== July 19–20: Lower Bracket (LB) ===
The Lower Bracket consisted of four rounds to decide the remaining team to challenge Newbee in the Grand Final. Matches were decided on a best-of-three basis. Round One comprised two matches between the four losers of matches B, C, E and F of Phase Three (Cloud9, Natus Vincere, Invictus and LGD). Round Two comprised two matches between the winners of the first round against the losers of Upper Bracket's Round One (ViCi and Team DK). Round Three comprised two matches between the winners of the second round, while Round Four put the winner of Round Three against the loser of Upper Bracket's Round Two (Evil Geniuses).

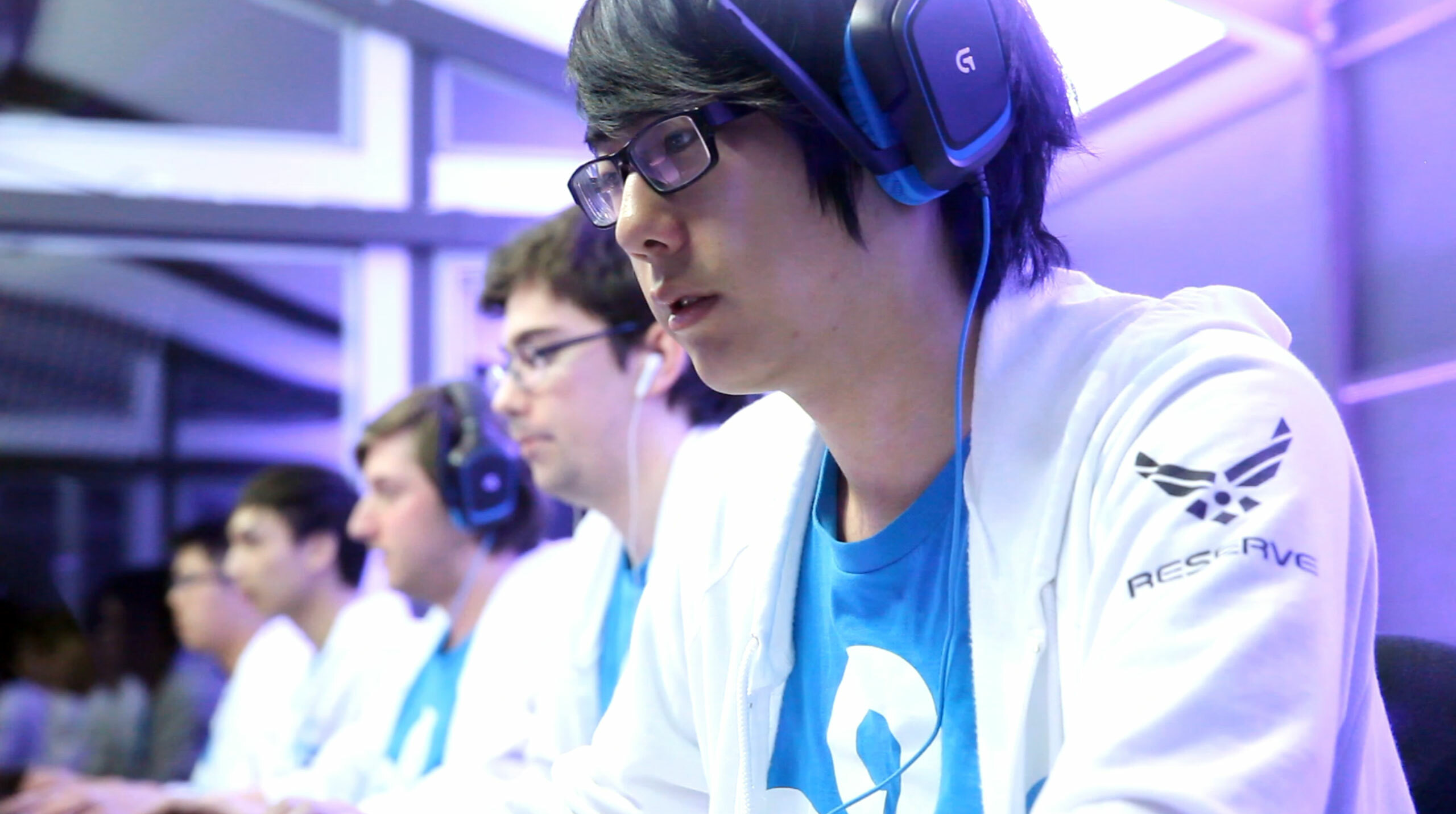
Cloud9 taking on Vici Gaming in the second round

=== July 21: Grand Final ===
The Grand Final of The International 2014 was between the Upper Bracket winner (Newbee) and the Lower Bracket winner (ViCi Gaming) for over 5 million dollars. NewBee reached the Grand Final by defeating Evil Geniuses in the Upper Bracket finals, while ViCi Gaming also defeated Evil Geniuses in the Lower Brackets en route to the Grand Final. The match was played on July 21, 2014, and was a best-of-five match. Unlike many other Dota 2 tournaments that feature a double-elimination bracket, there is no winners bracket advantage for the International 4: both teams require three game wins to take the championship.

Coming into the match Newbee and ViCi were tied in head-to-head results at 2-2 in this tournament, with ViCi winning the group-stage match 1–0, and Newbee winning the Upper Bracket match 2–1.

=== Bracket ===
Upper round 1	Upper final	Final
(China)	ViCi Gaming	1
(China)	NewBee	2
(China)	NewBee	2
(United States)	Evil Geniuses	0
(United States)	Evil Geniuses	2
(China)	Team DK	0
(China)	NewBee	3
(China)	ViCi Gaming	1
Lower round 1	Lower round 2	Lower round 3	Lower final
(China)	ViCi Gaming	2
(United Nations)	Cloud9	2	(United Nations)	Cloud9	1	(United States)	Evil Geniuses	1
(Ukraine)	Natus Vincere	1	(China)	ViCi Gaming	2	(China)	ViCi Gaming	2
(China)	Team DK	0
(China)	Team DK	2
(China)	Invictus Gaming	1	(China)	LGD Gaming	1
(China)	LGD Gaming	2

== Viewership ==
Valve announced that over 20 million unique viewers streamed the tournament. At its peak, concurrent viewers were over 2 million, lagging only behind League of Legends 2013 season finals, which reached 8.5 million concurrent viewers at its peak. According to an ESPN source reported by The Daily Dot, the broadcaster was so pleased with the success of the season finals that ESPN was looking to expand its esports coverage. Xbox was the leading viewing platform of The International 2014, despite Dota 2 being a PC game.

== Merchandise ==
During the four-day event visitors who managed to purchase a ticket for the event in the KeyArena got the chance to purchase unique merchandise at the Secret Shop. This merchandise was available on the upper level of the arena with long waiting lines curving around the hallways. The name of the merchandise shop, Secret Shop, is a reference to the in game store located in both the Radiant as well as the Dire jungle.

Every visitor received a goodie bag after picking up their entry badge for the KeyArena. This goodie bag was filled with Dota branded items such as a water bottle, secret shop booklet, hero pin and a booklet with information on the competing teams.
