= Ppd (gamer) =

American professional computer gamer

ppd
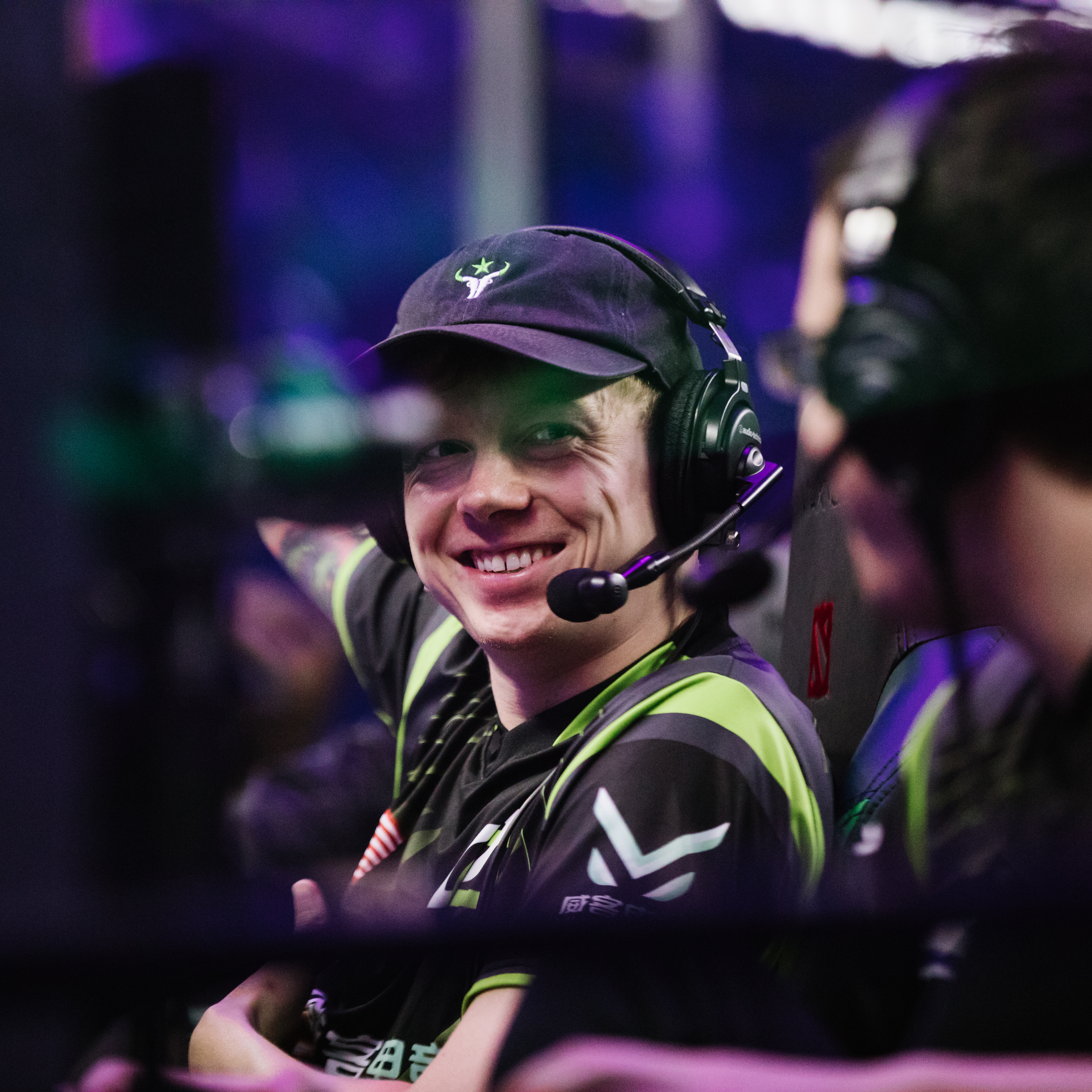
- ppd at The International 2018

Personal information
- Name: Peter Dager
- Nickname(s): Peterpandam, Franzzii
- Born: 1991 or 1992 (age 34–35)
- Nationality: American

Career information
- Games: Heroes of Newerth; Dota 2
- Playing career: 2010–2013 (HoN); 2013–2021 (Dota 2)
- Role: Support (Dota 2)
- Coaching career: 2021

Team history

As player:
- 2010–2011: SGty
- 2012: Trademark eSports
- 2012–2013: compLexity
- 2014–2016: Evil Geniuses
- 2017–2018: OpTic Gaming
- 2018–2020: Ninjas in Pyjamas
- 2020–2021: Sadboys

As coach:
- 2021: Alliance

Career highlights and awards
- The International champion (2015)

Peter Dager, better known as ppd, is an American former professional Dota 2 player. He was the former CEO of the esports organization Evil Geniuses, where he also won The International 2015 as a player-captain, later playing for OpTic Gaming and Ninjas in Pyjamas.

== Playing career ==
=== Heroes of Newerth ===
Dager began his esports career with Heroes of Newerth (HoN) in 2010, where he initially played under the alias "peterpandam" (which later became the acronym 'ppd'). He got vouched into the Fragment Inhouse League, where he reached the top of the competitive leaderboard; afterwards, he was invited to play for North American team SGty. With the team, he won North American Star League Season 2. Prior to playing in DreamHoN Winter 2011, Dager was kicked from the team. Dager joined his first professional team Trademark eSports in 2012. He began to experiment with many other teams until he found a more solid position with compLexity in Summer 2012. Dager came in second place at DreamHoN Summer 2013 with the compLexity HoN division. Shortly after, compLexity closed the division.

=== Dota 2 ===
Near the end of 2013, Dager followed the lead of many Heroes of Newerth pros before him and transitioned to Dota 2. Initially playing for few lesser known teams, he played on StayFree with teammate Wåhlberg. After The International 3, his talents earned him recruitment to Super Strong Dinosaurs with established players ComeWithMe and Sneyking. After the disbandment of SSD, Dager and Wåhlberg teamed up with Fear, UNiVeRsE, and Arteezy under the moniker S A D B O Y S. ppd took over the captain and drafting duties from Fear, and he immediately proved his worth with innovative styles of drafting. Together the team went on a 19-game win streak including a 1st-place finish in the Electronic Sports Prime/Shock Therapy Cup. On February 21, 2014, S A D B O Y S were announced as the new Evil Geniuses roster.

In March 2014, Dager made his Dota 2 LAN debut with EG at the Monster Energy Invitational, where they won 3–2 against Cloud9 in the finals. Under the leadership of Dager, EG began to establish themselves as one of the best teams in the world. ppd gained recognition for his drafts, which focused on the team's ability to play certain heroes at an exceptionally high level. On April 29 Dager and his EG teammates were directly invited to compete in The International 2014. They finished in the top 3 at three of the four major LANs prior to TI4, including taking first place at The Summit 1. Going into The International 4, EG was one of the favorites to win the tournament. EG ultimately struggled against the early game oriented meta at the tournament and ended up with a 3rd-place finish. After TI4, Dager took full responsibility for Evil Geniuses poor showing in their final match.

At The Summit 2, EG finished in fourth place behind some lackluster play. Despite the poor showing in the last tournament of the year, Dager led his team to championship titles in seven of the fifteen major competitions of the year.

In January 2015 'The great Western Dota reshuffle' was sparked by the departure of Arteezy and Zai from Evil Geniuses to Team Secret, which was due in large part to conflicts within the team. During several interviews Dager revealed the fact that he and his former teammate Artour had several disagreements on the heroes to draft, which led to the team's lack of practice for the latter part of 2014. With the Dota 2 Asia Championships quickly approaching, EG added SumaiL and Aui 2000 as stand-ins for the tournament. Behind Dager's drafts centered around SumaiL and stellar play from the rest of team, EG secured first place and took home, establishing themselves as the best team for the beginning of 2015. On May 6, 2015, Dager and the rest of Evil Geniuses were invited directly to The International 2015. Leading up to TI5 Evil Geniuses placed 2nd in three premier offline tournaments: joinDOTA MLG Pro League Season 1, The Summit 3, and ESL One Frankfurt 2015.

Evil Geniuses started TI5 off strong, placing first in Group B with a 10–4 record. After beating compLexity and EHOME at the main event, EG found themselves in the upper bracket finals matched up against CDEC Gaming. EG lost the match 2-0 and would have to head to the lower bracket. On the final day of the event EG squared off against LGD Gaming in the lower bracket finals and made quick work of them with a 2–0 win. Dager would get a second chance at figuring out his opponents in the final, CDEC gaming. EG prevailed with a 3–1 victory and were crowned The International champions, taking home the Aegis of Champions. One week after TI5, Dager and his teammates decided to remove Aui_2000 from Evil Geniuses in order to accommodate the return of Arteezy. Due to much outrage from the community over the decision, Dager made a post to his blog addressing why Aui_2000 was replaced.

After The International 2016, PPD became the CEO of Evil Geniuses and retired from competitive play. A year later, following The International 2017, he stepped down from the position to return to the competitive scene. He arranged a team which was later on signed by OpTic Gaming. Following a seventh-place finish at The International 2018, OpTic dropped their roster, with ppd joining Ninjas in Pyjamas that September. He announced his retirement from Dota 2 in April 2020.

== Coaching career ==
In May 2021, Alliance signed Dager as a coach for the remainder of the 2021 Dota Pro Circuit's second season.

== Personal life ==
Dager lives in Fort Wayne, Indiana.
