= Fear (gamer) =

American professional esports player and coach

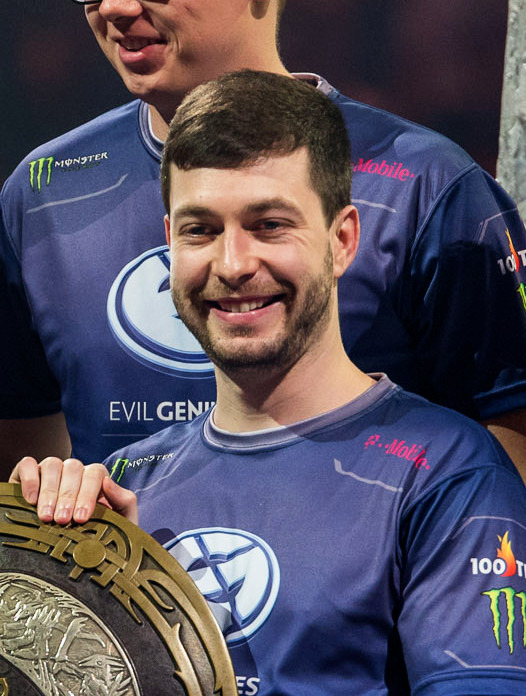
- Loomis in 2015

Personal information
- Name: Clinton Loomis
- Born: 1987 or 1988 (age 38–39)
- Nationality: American

Career information
- Games: Defense of the Ancients; Dota 2
- Playing career: 2005–2021
- Coaching career: 2014–2021

Team history

As player:
- 2005–2006: PluG Pullers Inc.
- 2006–2007: CompLexity Gaming
- 2007–2008: PluG Pullers V2
- 2008–2009: Meet Your Makers
- 2009: Evil Geniuses
- 2009–2010: Blight.int
- 2010: Nirvana.int
- 2010–2011: Lost.eu
- 2011: Browned Potatoes
- 2011: Online Kingdom
- 2011–2018: Evil Geniuses
- 2018–2020: J.Storm
- 2020: Business associates
- 2020–2021: Sadboys

As coach:
- 2014: Evil Geniuses
- 2016-2017: Evil Geniuses
- 2021: Thunder Predator

Career highlights and awards
- DAC 2015 champion; The International champion (2015)

Clinton Loomis, better known as Fear, is an American professional Dota 2 caster and former player. With a career spanning a decade, Fear is one of the oldest Dota players in the scene. He was featured alongside Danil "Dendi" Ishutin and Benedict Lim "hyhy" Han Yong in the documentary Free to Play. With Evil Geniuses, he won over a million dollars as the winners of The International 2015.

== History ==
=== Dota ===
Fear's first team was called PluG Pullers Inc., and they were picked up by CompLexity Gaming in 2006. After the compLexity Dota division was shut down in 2007, Fear reformed PluG Pullers, but left the team when he was asked to join Meet Your Makers. Fear was a member of MYM for a year, and he left the team a few weeks before the organization went bankrupt.

His next stop was Evil Geniuses, which lasted from March to December 2009 before the Dota division was disbanded. Fear then joined a star-studded Blight.int team, which changed sponsors before disbanding over salary issues. This led to a period of inactivity for Fear, as real-life commitments limited his ability to play competitively.

=== Dota 2 ===
==== 2011 ====
Fear's team Online Kingdom.Nirvana.int was one of the teams invited to The International 2011, where after an impressive 3–0 record in their group, finished a respectable 7th-8th place, the team taking home $25,000.

A few months after The International, Fear returned to Evil Geniuses.

==== 2014 ====
In January 2014, Fear and EG teammate Saahil "UNiVeRsE" Arora were seen as stand-ins for the team S A D B O Y S in addition to Sahan "KaTana" Gamage who was later dropped due to visa issues, consisting of Artour "Arteezy" Babaev, Peter "ppd" Dager, and Ludwig "zai" Wåhlberg. With an impressive 16–2 record in their 3 weeks of playing together, the team was picked up by Evil Geniuses as the new Dota team. After receiving an invite to The International 2014, Fear's arm problems became too much to handle, and he became the team's coach while Mason "mason" Venne joined the team in Fear's place in the "carry" position. Despite the setback, EG managed to finish 3rd place.

After recovering, Fear rejoined EG in August.

2015

With the addition of their youngest roster, Syed "Sumail" Hassan, Evil Geniuses took first place at the Dota 2 Asia Championships in February 2015. Later that year, Fear and Evil Geniuses won The International 2015, winning over six million dollars in prize money. After The International 2015, he transitioned from the "carry" to the "support" position to accommodate the return of his former teammate Arteezy. This new EG roster finished in third place in Frankfurt Major 2015 despite a strong showing early in the tournament.

2016

Fear and Evil Geniuses took third place at the Shanghai Major 2016. On June 26, Fear qualified with Evil Geniuses to The International 2016 by coming first in the Americas Qualifier Group Stage with a 5–1 record (and after defeating compLexity Gaming in a first place tiebreaker.) Fear and Evil Geniuses eventually finished third place in the event. After the tournament, Fear retired as a player, citing health issues, to focus on being the team's coach.

2017

At The International 2017, Fear participated as the coach of Evil Geniuses and finished 9th-12th at the tournament. After The International 2017, Fear rejoined the active roster of EG and assumed the captain role after the departures of zai and ppd.

2018

In May 2018, following a string of bad placements in Dota Pro Circuit tournaments, EG announced that Fear had been released but would remain a part of the organization in an undisclosed role. On December 14, 2018, Fear joined North American team J.Storm.

2019

With J.Storm, Fear became the Americas Champions of Betway Midas Mode 2.0.

2020

In the beginning of 2020, J.Storm disbanded its Dota team and its rosters including Fear are listed under a new Dota team called Business Associates. Fear held the captain position at Business Associate.
