= Sumail =

Pakistani esports player (born 1999)

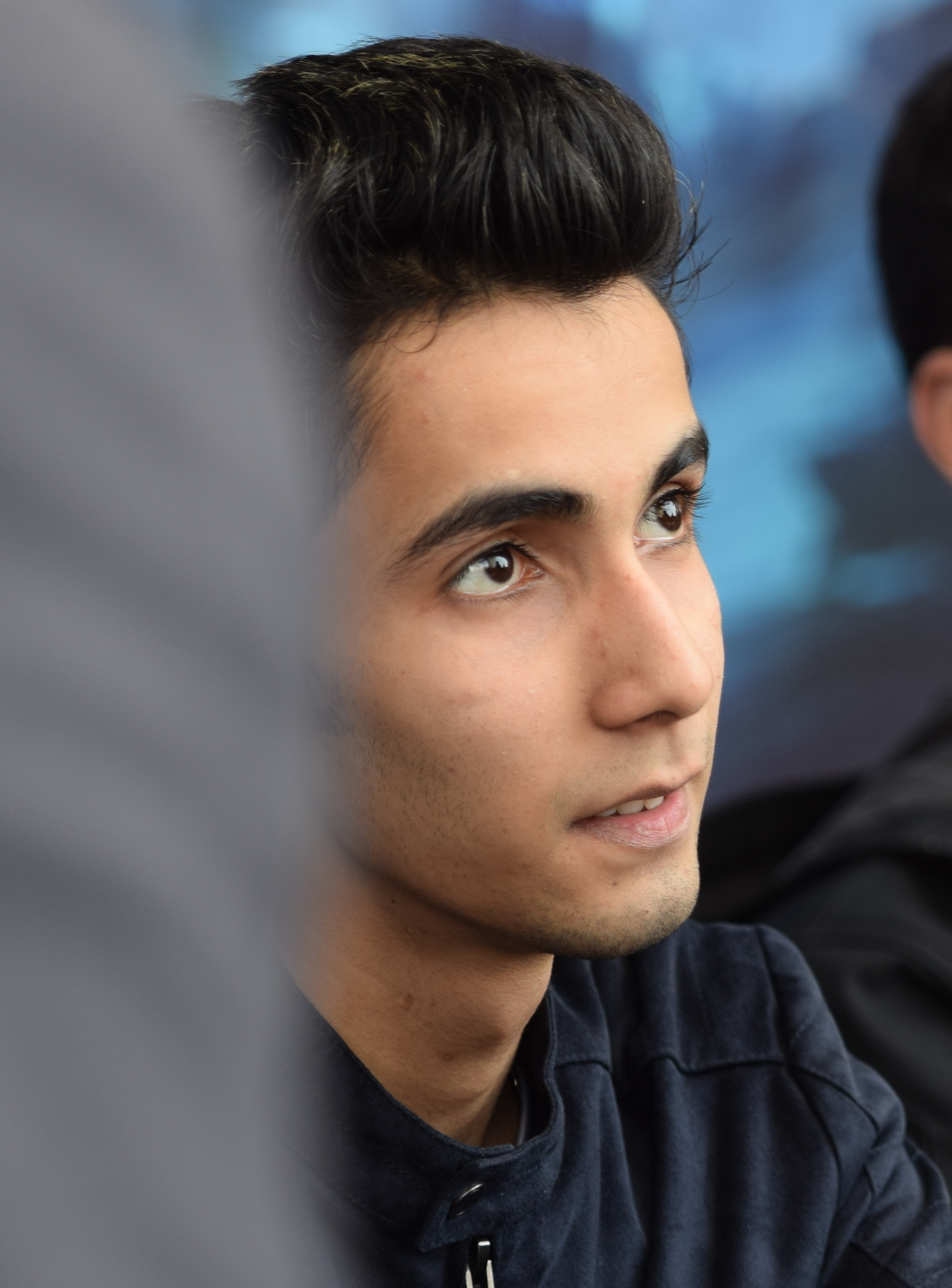
- Sumail in 2017

Personal information
- Name: Syed Sumail Hassan
- Born: 13 February 1999 (age 27); Karachi, Pakistan

Current team
- Team: LGD Gaming
- Game: Dota 2

Career information
- Playing career: 2014–present

Team history
- 2014–2019: Evil Geniuses
- 2019: Quincy Crew
- 2020: OG
- 2021: Team Liquid (stand-in)
- 2021: OG
- 2021–2022: Team Secret
- 2022–2026: Nigma Galaxy
- 2023: Team Aster (stand-in)
- 2023: Team Secret (stand-in)
- 2026–present: LGD Gaming

Career highlights and awards
- The International champion (2015)

Syed Sumail Hassan (Urdu: سمیل حسان ; born 13 February 1999), better known mononymously as Sumail, is a Pakistani professional Dota 2 player for LGD Gaming. He is a champion of The International, winning in 2015 as a member of Evil Geniuses.

Hassan's professional career began when he signed with Evil Geniuses in 2015. That same year, he and the team won The International 2015, which awarded him over a million dollars in prize money. He spent the next four years with the team, having varying degrees of success. In 2019, Hassan left EG to briefly play alongside his brother on the Quincy Crew before signing with OG in 2020. He has also played for Team Liquid, Team Aster, and Team Secret.

== Early years ==
Sumail was born on 13 February 1999, in Karachi, Pakistan. He has a brother, Yawar Hassan, who also plays professional Dota 2. Sumail first started playing Dota when he was eight years old. He and his family moved from Pakistan to the United States in 2012. He lives in Rosemont, Illinois, as a resident of the United States.

== Career ==
Upon his arrival to America, Sumail began playing in the North American Elite League. Hassan quickly became the highest rated player in the in-house league, establishing himself as one of the best unsigned talents in North America. Evil Geniuses (EG) signed him in January 2015, joining Fear, Aui_2000, Universe, and ppd. A month later, EG and Hassan participated in the Dota 2 Asia Championships, where finished in first place. EG's captain ppd entered the tournament with a focus on drafting around him. Sumail's breakout performance at the tournament led to widespread recognition as a young prodigy in both the Chinese and English Dota scenes.

EG entered The International 2015 as one of the tournament favorites. However, EG experienced a setback of their own after losing the upper bracket finals 0–2 to CDEC Gaming. EG defeated LGD Gaming in the lower bracket finals and prevailed 3–1 in a rematch with CDEC in the grand finals to win the tournament and a US$6.6 million grand prize, which made Sumail the youngest player ever to surpass a million in esports winnings. In 2016, Sumail was named by Time as among 'the 30 Most Influential Teens' that year. In September 2019, it was announced that he would be leaving the team to join the Quincy Crew alongside his brother Yawar. However, he left the team after only a few weeks, with the team's manager claiming he was not a "good fit" for them, before signing and playing with OG in 2020. Sumail left OG in July 2020.

In April 2021, Sumail signed with Team Liquid as a stand-in player for the second season of the 2021 Dota Pro Circuit. He would leave them and rejoin OG two months later.

He then rejoined OG in June 2021 before playing for Team Secret and Team Nigma.

In May 2023, Sumail joined Team Aster on loan until the end of The International 2023 cycle. In 2024, he competed in 1win Series Dota 2 Fall tournament. In February 2025, Sumail stood in for Stanislav "Malr1ne" Potorak at DreamLeague Season 25.

In September 2026, Sumail joined LGD Gaming as position two and is currently part of their active roster.
