= Arteezy =

Professional Dota 2 Player

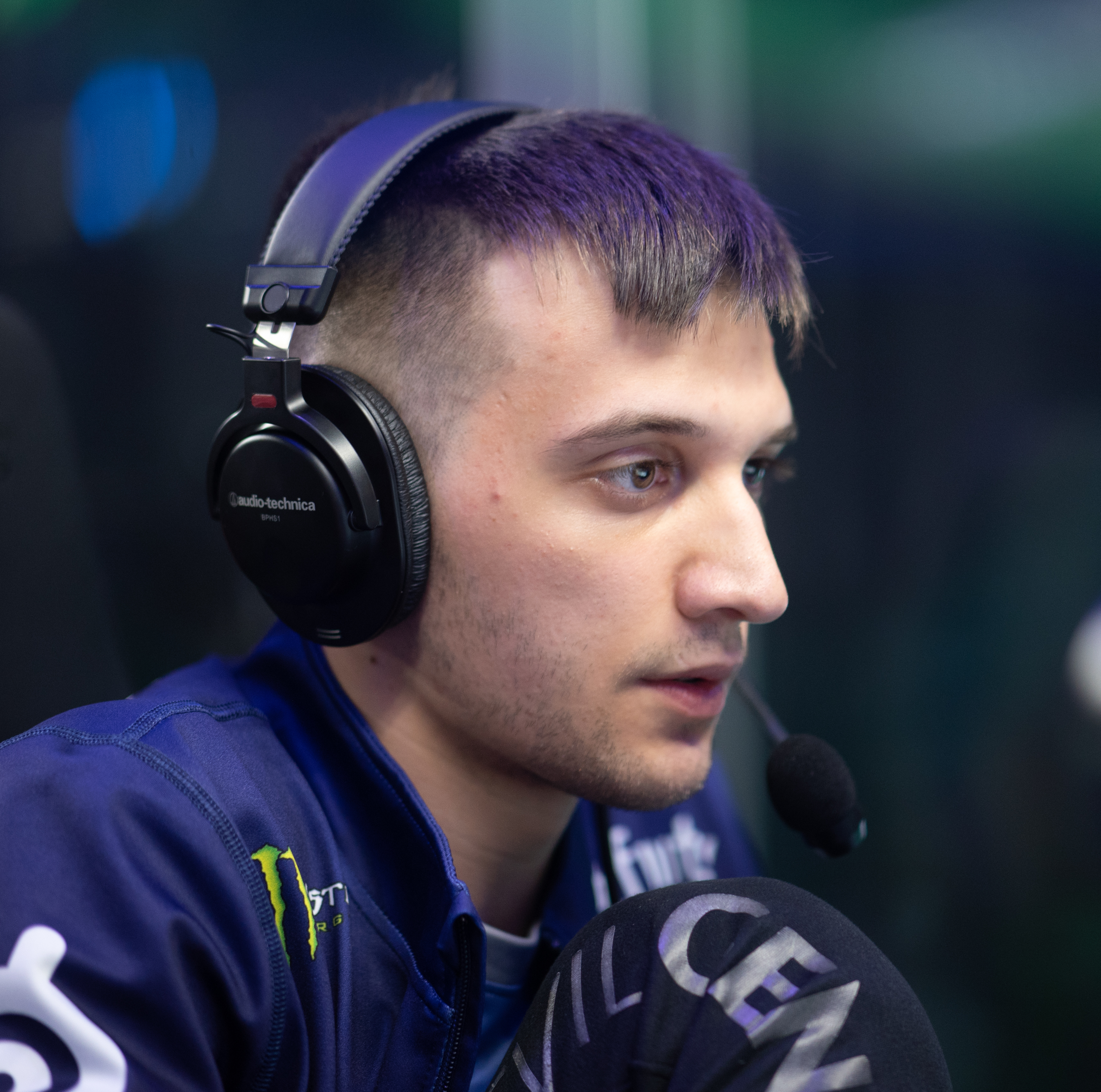
- Arteezy in August 2018
- Born: Artour Babaev; July 1, 1996 (age 30); Tashkent, Uzbekistan
- Occupations: Professional gamer; Streamer
- Years active: 2013–2024

Esports career information
- Game: Dota 2
- Role: Carry

Team history
- 2013: Speed Gaming
- 2014–2015: Evil Geniuses
- 2015: Team Secret
- 2015–2016: Evil Geniuses
- 2016: Team Secret
- 2016–2022: Evil Geniuses
- 2022–2025: Shopify Rebellion

Twitch information
- Channel: Arteezy
- Followers: 835,000

YouTube information
- Channel: Arteezy
- Subscribers: 32,000
- Last updated: April 21, 2025

Artour Babaev (born July 1, 1996), better known as Arteezy, is an Uzbek-Canadian professional Dota 2 player who last played professionally for Shopify Rebellion. An online streamer on Twitch since 2014, he became of the most popular streamers among the community.

Although born in Tashkent, Babaev and his family moved to Vancouver when he was 1 years old. His family moved frequently, before Babaev was born his parents, along with what would be his older brother Tigran, lived in Israel and Armenia. Babaev showed much promise as a teenager in Dota 2, reaching the highest matchmaking rating (MMR) on the public leaderboards. In November 2013, he made his professional debut in MLG Columbus as a stand-in for Speed Gaming. In January 2014, Babaev, along with North American Dota players Universe and Fear, as well as former Heroes of Newerth players ppd and zai created "S A D B O Y S" [sic], who were later signed by Evil Geniuses.

== History ==
=== 2013: Early career ===
On November 22, 2013, Arteezy had the opportunity to stand in for bOne7, who was unable to attend due to visa issues, and play for his previous team Speed Gaming (formerly Kaipi) at MLG Columbus. Arteezy handily defeated several more well-established midlaners, including Mushi and Dendi, en route to an underdog victory for Speed Gaming over the all-star Team DK in the finals.

=== 2014: Birth of Evil Geniuses ===
On January 31, 2014, Arteezy, along with Dota 2 veterans UNiVeRsE and Fear, as well as former Heroes of Newerth players ppd and zai, created S A D B O Y S [sic], which had immediate success. The team won 16 out of their first 18 matches, including winning the Electronic Sports Prime/Shock Therapy Cup while going undefeated. On February 21, 2014, Arteezy and company were announced to be the new Evil Geniuses Dota 2 squad, which continued to be a top-tier team despite being from the weaker North American scene.

On March 7, 2014, the new EG attended their first LAN tournament at the Monster Energy Invitational, where they won 3–2 against Cloud9 in the finals. With this victory, the team firmly established its reputation as one of the best Dota 2 teams in the world, due in no small part to Arteezy's skill. On April 29, 2014, Evil Geniuses were directly invited to compete in The International 2014 Dota 2 Championships. With top 3 finishes at three of the four major LANs before TI4, including a first-place finish at The Summit 1 over Team DK, EG was one of the favorites to win the biggest Dota 2 tournament of the year. EG was not as successful as the Chinese Dota 2 teams in adapting to the more aggressive play-style at TI4 but still ended with a 3rd-place finish, taking home US$1,038,416.

=== 2015: Joined Team Secret ===
After some internal issues with EG, Arteezy left the team and joined Team Secret in December 2014. With Arteezy transitioning to the carry position, Team Secret stormed through The Summit 3, Mars Dota League 2015 and ESL One Frankfurt 2015 taking 1st place at each, establishing themselves as the favorites for The International 2015. Team Secret ultimately finished 7–8th place at TI5. Following this result, in August he rejoined Evil Geniuses as the carry, with SumaiL continuing in the mid-lane position. This new Evil Geniuses roster finished in third place in Frankfurt Major 2015 despite a strong showing early in the tournament, losing to the eventual winners of the tournament, OG.

=== 2016: Highest ranked player ===
EG again finished third at the Shanghai Major 2016 and second at Dota Pit Season 4. On March 22, 2016, Arteezy and teammate Saahil Arora, better known as Universe, left the team to join Team Secret. Universe later re-joined EG before TI6, while Arteezy remained on Team Secret. In September, Babaev left Secret during the post-TI shuffle, returning to Evil Geniuses once again with former Team OG player Cr1t. In July 2016, Arteezy became the second player in Dota 2 history to reach 9,000 Matchmaking Rating (MMR) in online matchmaking. The first player to reach this rating was Team Liquid player Miracle-.

=== 2017: The Manila Masters champion ===
Evil Geniuses managed to get first place in The Manila Masters tournament, winning the first prize of $125,000. Later on The International 2017 tournament, despite being one of the directly invited teams, EG finished 9th-12th in the tournament. This led to the departure of position 4 player Zai, who was replaced by former team coach Fear.

=== 2018: The International 2018 ===
On July 27, 2018, Evil Geniuses won North America in-house tournament Summit 9 organized by Beyond The Summit. In August 2018, Arteezy and Evil Geniuses finished third place at The International 2018, marking his second 3rd-place finish at the International, his best overall performance.

=== 2019: The International 2019 ===
In August 2019, Arteezy and Evil Geniuses finished 5th-6th at The International 2019. Arteezy made a remarkable performance, getting a solo rampage versus 5 enemies on his game with Evil Geniuses against Vici Gaming.

=== 2020: The International 2020 ===
Due to the COVID-19 pandemic, The International was postponed until 2021.

=== 2021: The International 2021 ===
In October 2021, Arteezy and Evil Geniuses achieved a 9th-12th place finish at The International 2021, receiving $800,400.

=== 2022: The International 2022 ===
In October 2022, Arteezy and Evil Geniuses finished 9th-12th place at The International 2022. On November 15, 2022, it was announced that Evil Geniuses would be dropping their current Dota 2 roster. On December 9, 2022, Arteezy joined Shopify Rebellion.

=== 2023: The International 2023 ===
Arteezy, now a member of Shopify Rebellion, took part in the International hosted in Seattle, Washington in October 2023. The team underperformed, based on expectations on the squad, and finished the tournament in 13th to 16th place. As a result of the poor performance of the squad, Shopify Rebellion splintered, and as of now, only Arteezy and Saberlight remain within Canada's Shopify organization.

=== 2024: The International 2024 absent ===
After failing to qualify for The International 2024, Arteezy announced that he is stepping down from Shopify Rebellions Dota 2 active roster to focus on streaming and content creation.

=== 2025: Departure of Shopify Rebellion ===
In April 2025, Arteezy announced that he is no longer affiliated with the team.

== Personal life ==
Arteezy was born in Tashkent, Uzbekistan, to Uzbek parents of Russian and Armenian ancestry, and moved to Canada at the age of 2. He used to speak Russian at home, but due to a lack of practice, can now only understand spoken Russian, and cannot speak nor write it. Before playing Dota 2 professionally he played the original DotA as well as Starcraft II. Arteezy played Protoss, and reached Masters before he started playing Dota 2. Arteezy dated Chinese content creator, host, interviewer, translator, and a caster named Zhang Tiange, nicknamed "Dove" since 2017. Arteezy and Dove became engaged on December 29, 2024.

=== In-game nicknames ===
Arteezy's nickname originates from an eighth-grade friend who called him this out of the blue. He later changed it to "天鸽", meaning Tiange, a reference to the name of his fiancée, Dove. The playerbase, however, continues to call him "Arteezy" or variations such as "RTZ", with the phrase "2EZ4RTZ" becoming a popular meme during his peak.

== Awards and nominations ==
| Year | Ceremony | Category | Result | Ref. |
|---|---|---|---|---|
| 2024 | The Streamer Awards | Best MOBA Streamer | Nominated | |
