= Free to Play (film) =

- Release poster
- Based on: Dota 2
- Starring: Benedict Lim; Danil Ishutin; Clinton Loomis
- Cinematography: Phil Co; Nick Maggiore; Jeff Unay
- Music by: Mark Adler
- Production company: Valve
- Distributed by: Valve
- Release date: March 19, 2014
- Running time: 75 minutes
- Country: United States
- Language: English
- Budget: $150,000

Free to Play is a 2014 documentary film by American video game company Valve. The film takes a critical look at the lives of Benedict "hyhy" Lim, Danil "Dendi" Ishutin and Clinton "Fear" Loomis, three professional Defense of the Ancients (DotA) players who participated in the first International, the most lucrative esports tournament at the time. The central focus of the film is how their commitment to DotA had affected their lives and how this debut tournament for the sequel, Dota 2, would bring more meaning to their struggles.

== Synopsis ==
The documentary focuses on three different players who arrive in Cologne, Germany, to compete in an esports tournament for Dota 2, The International, which will award the winning team a prize of one million dollars.

Singaporean team Scythe Gaming is led by Benedict "hyhy" Lim. Parts of the film explore his life in Singapore, where he lives with his mother, aunt, and father. His father works long hours for a shipping company at the nearby port to support the family, and his mother and aunt disapprove of the time he spends on video games, which has led his grades to suffer. In order to attend The International, Hyhy must skip his final exams at school, and he feels that only winning the $1 million grand prize will demonstrate to his family that his gaming career is worthy of respect. He also admits that he is still in love with his ex-girlfriend, and hopes that a win at the International will impress her enough for her to give him a second chance.

Meanwhile, Clinton "Fear" Loomis, an American player from Medford, Oregon, is older than the other contestants, but he leads multinational team Online Kingdom in the hopes that he can finally prove that his life is going somewhere. Fear grew up under the care of his single mother, who eventually came to respect his skill at video games. As a young man in his 20s, Fear has found it difficult to support himself financially as a full-time gamer, being forced to play his matches on an old, secondhand CRT monitor.

Finally, Danil "Dendi" Ishutin of Ukrainian team Na'Vi uses Dota 2 to cope with the tragic death of his father. Dendi's mother reveals that Dendi and his father were very close and would often go fishing together. Since his father's unexpected death from cancer, Dendi has never again gone fishing and has instead thrown himself into his gaming career.

During the first stage of the competition, Online Kingdom, considered to be an underdog team, surprises onlookers by placing first in their group. Another group includes both Na`Vi and Scythe Gaming, who place first and third, respectively. In the playoffs, Online Kingdom end their run with losses to Chinese team Invictus Gaming and Russian team Moscow Five, and take home $25,000 as the 7th place team.

The strongest teams remaining are Scythe, Na'Vi, and EHome, a well-disciplined Chinese team. Scythe manages to defeat EHome, but loses to Na`Vi and is then eliminated in the lower bracket finals in a rematch with EHome. In the best-of-five championship series between EHome and Na`Vi, EHome manage to hand Na`Vi their first loss of the tournament, but in the end Dendi, an unpredictable but highly skilled playmaker, leads his team to victory and Na`Vi takes home the grand prize of $1 million.

Hyhy's team, Scythe Gaming, takes home $150,000 as the third-place finisher. Despite not winning the first place prize, Hyhy is ultimately successful in convincing his girlfriend to get back together with him. Fear finally buys a new computer with his share of the prize and moves in with his teammates (he would later go on to win The International 2015 with his team, Evil Geniuses, 4 years later). Dendi, with newfound peace of mind, goes fishing for the first time since the death of his father.

== Reception ==
Free to Play was generally well received by critics. Chris Zele of Maximum PC magazine, who was unfamiliar with the Dota franchise upon viewing the film, called Free to Play not only one of the best video game documentaries, but documentaries about any topic that he had ever seen. Philippa Warr of Wired magazine praised the film for drawing parallels between competitive video gaming and other sporting activities, while also noting that the film runs the risk of not connecting in certain areas, as in-game knowledge may be necessary for comprehending battle scenes. Brian Albert of IGN gave similar praise for being emotionally engaging and with a great deal of variety, while also criticizing it for failing to explain more intricate details about Dota 2 for those unfamiliar with the game.
