= Aui 2000 =

Canadian esports player and coach (born c. 1992)

Aui_2000
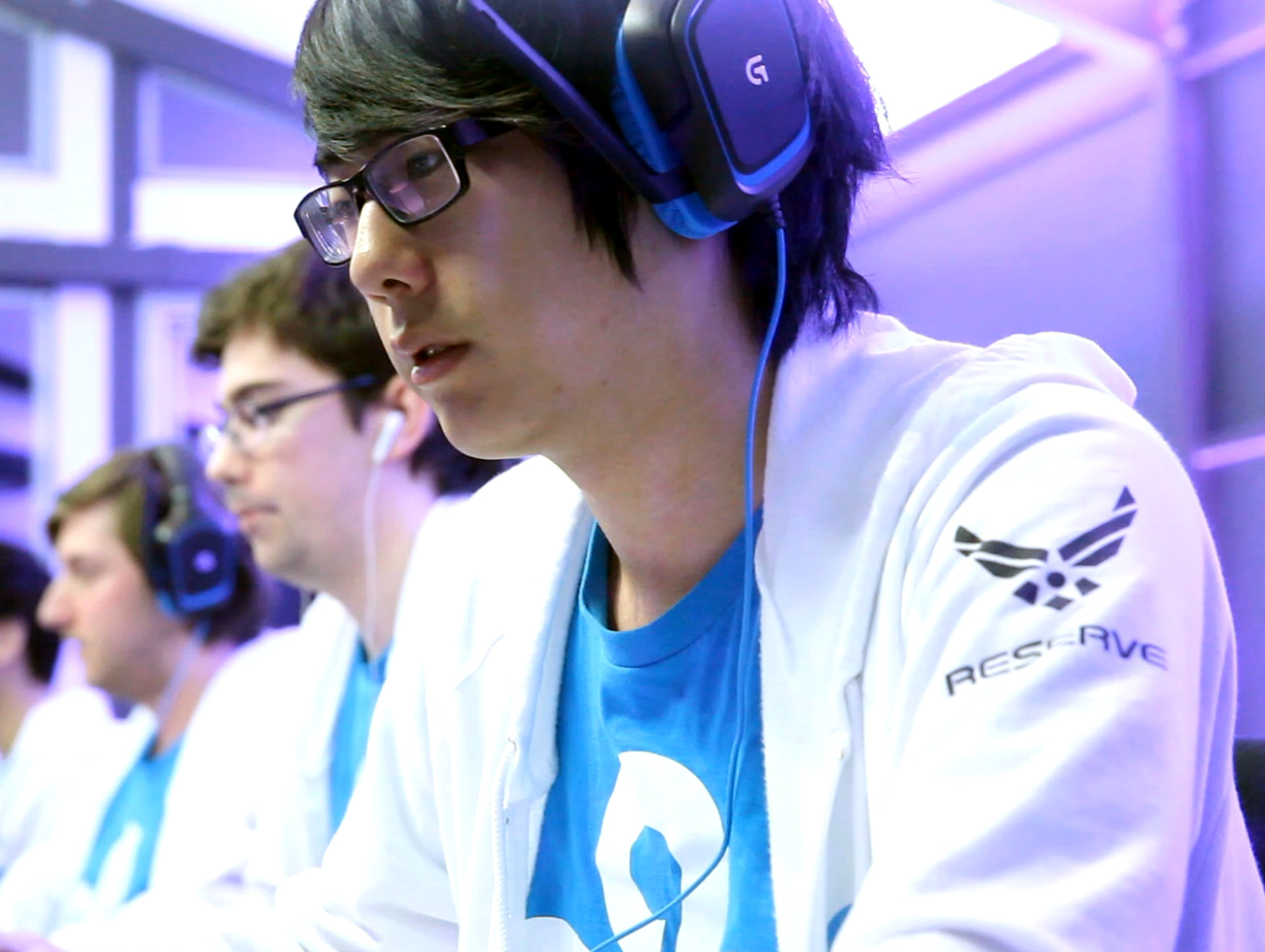
- Ling in 2014

Personal information
- Name: Kurtis Ling
- Born: October 2, 1992 (age 34)
- Nationality: Canadian

Career information
- Game: Dota 2
- Playing career: 2012–2021
- Coaching career: 2021–present

Team history

As player:
- 2012: PotM Bottom
- 2012–2013: Team Dignitas
- 2013–2014: Speed Gaming (Note: Speed Gaming was rebranded from RSnake.)
- 2014–2015: Cloud9
- 2015: Evil Geniuses
- 2015–2016: Digital Chaos
- 2016: Evil Geniuses
- 2016–2017: Team NP
- 2017: Cloud9
- 2018: Animal Planet (Note: Animal Planet briefly rebranded to Iceberg Esports.)
- 2018: Digital Chaos
- 2021: Arkosh Gaming

As coach:
- 2016: Team Secret
- 2018–2019: Forward Gaming
- 2019: Newbee
- 2021–2023: Tundra Esports
- 2024–present: Team Falcons

Career highlights and awards
- As player: The International champion (2015); As coach: 2× The International champion (2022, 2025)

Kurtis Ling (born October 2, 1992), better known as Aui_2000 or simply Aui, is a Canadian former professional Dota 2 player who is the current head coach for Team Falcons. Widely regarded as one of the greatest Dota 2 players of all time, Ling is a three-time champion of The International, first as a player of Evil Geniuses in 2015, and twice as a coach with Tundra Esports in 2022, and Team Falcons in 2025.

== Personal life ==
Kurtis attended the University of British Columbia before dropping out to play Dota 2 professionally full-time. His parents were initially skeptical of his career choice but eventually accepted it as he won more tournaments.

== History ==
EG acquired Ling from Cloud9 in January 2015.

On August 14, Aui_2000 was kicked off of the team just days after winning TI5. Artour "Arteezy" Babaev replaced him on the roster. His sudden dismissal after winning the Dota 2 championships sparked some outrage from the community, and forced team captain Peter "ppd" Dager to write a blog detailing the reasons behind Aui_2000's removal from the team.

Shortly after being kicked from EG, Ling formed his own team, Digital Chaos, but struggled to achieve any significant results. On March 25, following the abrupt departure of Artour "Arteezy" Babaev and Saahil "UNiVeRsE" Arora from Evil Geniuses, Ling announced that he would be rejoining the team. Ling was kicked from the team once again after the Manila Major 2016 in June.

For the 2017 season, Aui_2000 joined Team NP. They managed to qualify for The International 2017 before being signed by the Cloud9 organization. They were eliminated during the first round of the Lower Bracket by Team Empire.

For the 2018 season, Aui_2000 joined Forward Gaming as a coach. On July 21, 2019, Forward Gaming was dissolved; the roster was then signed to represent Chinese organization Newbee at The International 2019.

In August 2026, following Team Falcons' run at The International 2026, Ling said that he did not intend to continue his Dota 2 career and believed the 2026 season would likely be his last, as he cited the strain of frequent travel
