= The International 2016 =

2016 esports tournament

Tournament information
- Game: Dota 2
- Location: Seattle, Washington, U.S.
- Dates: August 3–13, 2016
- Administrator: Valve
- Tournament formats: Group stage; Round robin; Main event; double elimination
- Venue: KeyArena
- Participants: 16 teams
- Purse: $20,770,460

Final positions
- Champions: Wings Gaming
- 1st runner-up: Digital Chaos
- 2nd runner-up: Evil Geniuses

The International 2016 (TI6) was the sixth iteration of The International, an annual Dota 2 esports championship tournament. Hosted by Valve Corporation, the game's developer, the tournament began in June 2016 with the qualifier phase and ended after the main event at the KeyArena in Seattle in August. The tournament awarded the biggest prize pool in esports history at over $20 million, surpassing the record set at the previous International, with the champion team, Wings Gaming, winning over $9 million.

== Background and format ==
Like in previous years of the tournament, a corresponding digital compendium for Dota 2 was released before the event. Known as the Battle Pass, 25% of the revenue made by it was sent towards the tournament's prize pool. By the end of July, the crowdfunded prize pool had surpassed the previous year's total of $18.4 million, overtaking it as the largest esports tournament prize pool in history, eventually reaching over $20.7 million.

The event began with open qualifiers in June, with the Americas, China, Europe, and Southeast Asia regions. The winners of each region then went on to the main qualifiers, which also took place in June. Winners of the regional qualifier earned an invite to the main event, while a secondary playoff bracket took place for teams in 2nd-5th place, with the winner of them also earning an invite. Six teams were directly invited without need for qualifying, which was based on consistently good results at previous Dota 2 events. However, The International 2015 champion team Evil Geniuses did not receive a direct invite due to breaking Valve's rules on roster swapping prior to the tournament. They and Team Secret, who also broke the same rule, were forced to make their way through the open and main qualifiers, eventually finishing first in their respective regions, gaining an invite. Two teams from the Philippines, TnC Gaming and Execration, had issues securing travel visas to the United States, but were eventually able to get them one week before the event due to assistance from Filipino senator Bam Aquino.

The event began with the wild card matches on August 2, with the EHOME and Escape Gaming advancing to the round robin group stage the following day. The round robin group stage consisted of two groups of eight teams, with the top four teams of each group advancing to the upper bracket of the best-of-three double elimination main event, and the bottom four advancing to the lower bracket. The Grand Finals, consisting of the winners of the upper and lower brackets, will take place in a best-of-five series.

== Teams ==
Direct invitation

- (Europe) OG
- (Europe) Team Liquid
- (Ukraine) Natus Vincere
- (China) LGD Gaming
- (China) Newbee
- (South Korea) MVP Phoenix

Regional qualifier winners

- (United States) Evil Geniuses (Americas)
- (United States) Digital Chaos (Americas runner-up)
- Wings Gaming (China)
- Vici Gaming Reborn (China runner-up)
- Team Secret (Europe)
- (Sweden) Alliance (Europe runner-up)
- (Philippines) TnC Gaming (Southeast Asia)
- (Malaysia) Fnatic (Southeast Asia runner-up)

Wild card

- (United States) compLexity Gaming (Americas)
- EHOME (China)
- (European Union) Escape Gaming (Europe)
- (Philippines) Execration (Southeast Asia)

== Bracket ==
=== Wild card ===
Round one
(China) EHOME	2
(Philippines) Execration	1
Winner's bracket
(Europe) Escape Gaming	2
(United States) compLexity Gaming	1
Loser's bracket
(United States) compLexity Gaming	0
(Philippines) Execration	2

Round two
(China) EHOME	2
(Europe) Escape Gaming	0
(Europe) Escape Gaming	2
(Philippines) Execration	0

=== Group stage ===
All matches consisted of two games against the same opponent in a round robin format for each group, with two points being awarded for a 2–0 sweep, one point awarded for a 1–1 draw, and no points awarded for a 0–2 loss.

==== Group A ====
Pos	Team	Pld	W	D	L	Pts	
1	OG	7	4	3	0	11	Advanced to the upper bracket
2	Evil Geniuses	7	3	3	1	9	Advanced to the upper bracket
3	Alliance	7	3	2	2	8	Advanced to the upper bracket
4	Wings Gaming	7	3	2	2	8	Advanced to the upper bracket
5	TnC Gaming	7	3	1	3	7	Advanced to the lower bracket
6	Natus Vincere	7	2	2	3	6	Advanced to the lower bracket
7	LGD Gaming	7	1	3	3	5	Advanced to the lower bracket
8	Escape Gaming	7	0	2	5	2	Advanced to the lower bracket

Updated to match(es) played on August 5. Source:

==== Group B ====
Pos	Team	Pld	W	D	L	Pts	
1	EHOME	7	5	2	0	12	Advanced to the upper bracket
2	Digital Chaos	7	4	3	0	11	Advanced to the upper bracket
3	Newbee	7	3	2	2	8	Advanced to the upper bracket
4	MVP Phoenix	7	0	6	1	6	Advanced to the upper bracket
5	Fnatic	7	2	1	4	5	Advanced to the lower bracket
6	Team Secret	7	2	1	4	5	Advanced to the lower bracket
7	Team Liquid	7	1	3	3	5	Advanced to the lower bracket
8	Vici Gaming Reborn	7	1	2	4	4	Advanced to the lower bracket

Updated to match(es) played on August 5. Source:

== Main event ==
The best of five Grand Finals were between Wings Gaming, the upper bracket winner, and Digital Chaos, which won the lower bracket. Wings Gaming lost the first game to Digital Chaos, before winning three games in a row to win the series.

=== Bracket ===
Upper round 1	Upper round 2	Upper final	Grand Finals (best of five)
A1	OG	1
B4	MVP Phoenix	2
B4	MVP Phoenix	0
A4	Wings Gaming	2
B2	Digital Chaos	1
A4	Wings Gaming	2
A4	Wings Gaming	2
A2	Evil Geniuses	0
B1	EHOME	2
A3	Alliance	0
B1	EHOME	0
A2	Evil Geniuses	2
A2	Evil Geniuses	2
B3	Newbee	0
A4	Wings Gaming	3
B2	Digital Chaos	1
Lower round 1	Lower round 2	Lower round 3	Lower round 4	Lower round 5	Lower final
A1	OG	0
B1	EHOME	0
A5	TnC Gaming	1	A5	TnC Gaming	2
A5	TnC Gaming	1	B2	Digital Chaos	2
B8	Vici Gaming Reborn	0
B2	Digital Chaos	2	A2	Evil Geniuses	1
B2	Digital Chaos	2
B2	Digital Chaos	2	B2	Digital Chaos	2
B6	Team Secret	0	A7	LGD Gaming	0
B5	Fnatic	0
A7	LGD Gaming	1
A3	Alliance	0
B4	MVP Phoenix	0
B5	Fnatic	1	B5	Fnatic	2
B5	Fnatic	2	B5	Fnatic	2
A8	Escape Gaming	0
B7	Team Liquid	0
B3	Newbee	1
A6	Natus Vincere	0	B7	Team Liquid	2
B7	Team Liquid	1

== Results ==
(Note: Prizes are in USD)

Place	Team	Prize money
1	Wings Gaming	$9,139,002
2	Digital Chaos	$3,427,126
3	Evil Geniuses	$2,180,898
4	Fnatic	$1,442,000
5–6	EHOME	$934,671
5–6	MVP Phoenix	$934,671
7–8	Team Liquid	$519,262
7–8	TnC Gaming	$519,262
9–12	Alliance	$311,557
9–12	OG	$311,557
9–12	LGD Gaming	$311,557
9–12	Newbee	$311,557
13–16	Escape Gaming	$103,852
13–16	Natus Vincere	$103,852
13–16	Team Secret	$103,852
13–16	Vici Gaming Reborn	$103,852
