= Peak6 =

American financial Services company

PEAK6 Investments LLC
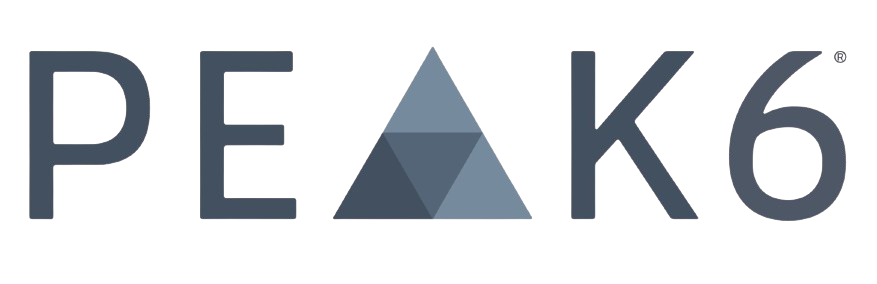
- Type: Private
- Industry: Financial services
- Founded: 1997; 29 years ago
- Founders: Matt Hulsizer; Jenny Just
- Headquarters: Austin, Texas, U.S.
- Products: Proprietary trading; Market making; Investment management; Fintech
- Subsidiaries: Apex Fintech Solutions
- Website: www.peak6.com

PEAK6 Investments LLC (Peak6) is an American financial services company headquartered in Austin, Texas. Originally dealing in options proprietary trading, it has expanded into other businesses most notably investment management and fintech.

PEAK6 places emphasis on Diversity, equity, and inclusion.

== Background ==
In 1997, Peak6 was founded in Chicago by Matt Hulsizer and Jenny Just who were previously options traders O'Connor & Associates. They left after O'Connor was acquired by UBS and the new venture was funded by $1.5 million in seed capital from partners at O'Connor, friends and family.

Peak6 achieved early success by options proprietary trading and used the profits to profits to expand its business. In 2006, Peak6 launched OptionsHouse, an online options and equities brokerage platform. Peak6 also launched a hedge fund.

In May 2012, Penson Worldwide which owned the clearing and custody firm used to settle trades and hold assets for OptionsHouse asked to borrow money from Peak6 as it was close to bankruptcy. Peak6 then paid $60 million to acquire Penson's clearing business which was formed as a new entity, Apex Clearing (now known as Apex Fintech Solutions).

In 2014, Peak6 sold OptionsHouse to General Atlantic for $200 million. In September that year, Peak6 spun out its $2.3 billion hedge fund as Achievement Asset Management.

By 2015, various fintech firms such as Robinhood Markets, Wealthfront, Betterment and Stash had started using Apex. Apex also expanded into powering digital wealth management and in 2018, started offering cryptocurrency services.

Peak6 has attempted to lessen the gender imbalance at the company. In 2016, it launched an intern program called "Trading Experience for Women". Initially it began with 7 women in the program and by 2021 it had trained 40 women since inception leading to 35% of Peak6's traders being female. In 2018, Peak6 added a software engineering internship for women and in 2021, added a product internship for women. Peak6 has also launched an outside venture in June 2020 named Poker Power, which aims to teach a million women to play Texas Hold'em.

In September 2020, BBC News reported Peak6 was looking to add an office in Belfast, Northern Ireland that would create 160 jobs. Invest Northern Ireland has offered more than £1 million in support.

In February 2021, Peak6 announced that it planned to list Apex on the New York Stock Exchange via a SPAC merger with Jon Ledecky's Northern Star Investment Corp. II which would value Apex at $4.7 billion. However, by December 2021, the plan was withdrawn mainly due to scrutiny by the regulators which led to a $1.5 million settlement by the U.S. Securities and Exchange Commission. In December 2023, it was reported that Apex had filed for a traditional IPO listing.

In December 2024, it was reported that Peak6 would move its headquarters from Chicago to Austin, Texas.

== Notable investments ==
Peak6 has been noted to make investments in football clubs. Previous investments include AS Roma,Wolverhampton Wanderers F.C., AFC Bournemouth and Dundalk F.C.

In May 2019, Peak6 acquired esports organization Evil Geniuses with Peak6 employee Nicole LaPointe Jameson becoming its CEO. In August 2023, Her tenure had multiple controversies and in August 2023 Jameson stepped down from her post. Sumail sued Evil Geniuses and Peak6 in December 2021 over contract negotiations and stock ownership which related to Peak6's acquisition terms. In March 2024, the jury sided with Evil Geniuses and Peak6.

== See also ==
- Proprietary trading
- Evil Geniuses
