= Dota 2 Asia Championships 2015 =

Dota 2 tournament in China

Dota 2 Asia Championships
- Dota 2 Asia Championships logo

Tournament information
- Sport: Dota 2
- Location: Shanghai, China
- Dates: 5 January–9 February 2015
- Administrator: Valve
- Tournament format(s): Group stage Round robin Bracket; Double elimination
- Host: Perfect World
- Venue: Shanghai Grand Stage
- Teams: 16
- Purse: $3,057,500

Final positions
- Champions: Evil Geniuses
- 1st runner-up: Vici Gaming
- 2nd runner-up: Team Secret

The Dota 2 Asia Championships 2015, (Chinese: 亚洲邀请赛; pinyin: Yà zhōu yāo qǐng sài) also known as DAC 2015, was a professional Dota 2 tournament that occurred in Shanghai, China from 5 January – 9 February 2015 at the Shanghai Grand Stage. It was organized and hosted by Perfect World. The tournament resembled The International, in that there were a number of teams directly invited and that there was a compendium released which contributed to the tournament's prize purse.

The tournament was won by Evil Geniuses. Sixteen teams competed in the tournament. Eight teams received direct invitations, they were Vici Gaming, LGD Gaming, Newbee, Invictus Gaming, Team Secret, Evil Geniuses, MVP Phoenix, and Rave. The rest of the teams were determined through qualifiers held for America, Europe, Asia, and a wildcard. The qualified teams through wildcard were TongFu.WanZhou, CDEC Gaming, EHOME, Big God, Cloud9, HellRaisers, Natus Vincere, and HyperGloryTeam.

There was a legal dispute between Huomao TV and Douyu TV over streaming rights for the tournament.

== Results ==
Place	Team	Prize money*
1	Evil Geniuses	$1,284,158
2	Vici Gaming	$366,902
3	Team Secret	$275,177
4	Big God	$214,026
5	Cloud9	$152,876
5	Rave	$152,876
7	HyperGloryTeam	$122,301
7	Invictus Gaming	$122,301
9-12	EHOME.cn	$30,575
9-12	Natus Vincere	$30,575
9-12	HellRaisers	$30,575
9-12	LGD Gaming	$30,575
13-16	TongFu.WanZhou	$15,288
13-16	CDEC Gaming	$15,288
13-16	Newbee	$15,288
13-16	MVP Phoenix	$15,288
17-20	Wings Gaming	$15,288
17-20	Energy Pacemaker	$15,288
17-20	Speed Gaming	$15,288
17-20	Power Rangers	$15,288
* All prizes are in USD
