= Frankfurt Major =

2015 Dota 2 tournament

Tournament information
- Sport: Dota 2
- Location: Frankfurt, Germany
- Dates: November 13–21, 2015
- Administrator: Valve
- Tournament format(s): Group stage Round robin Bracket; Double elimination
- Host(s): Electronic Sports League
- Venue(s): Festhalle Frankfurt
- Teams: 16 teams
- Purse: US$3,000,000

Final positions
- Champions: OG
- 1st runner-up: Team Secret
- 2nd runner-up: Evil Geniuses

The Frankfurt Major, also known as the Fall Major, was a Dota 2 tournament which took place from November 13–21, 2015. The tournament took place at the Festhalle Frankfurt in Frankfurt, Germany. It was the first of three Valve sponsored major Dota tournaments for the 2015–16 season, which were announced by the company on April 25, 2015. 16 teams competed in the tournament, which used the same format as The International 2015. The Electronic Sports League (ESL) hosted and organized the tournament.

Eight teams received direct invitations, which were announced on October 5. Regional Qualifiers took place on October 10–13, while the Open Qualifiers, open to any player, were run on October 6–9. Registration for the Open Qualifiers began on October 1. Although directly invited, China-based team Invictus Gaming encountered visa problems and on November 11 it was announced they would be replaced by another Chinese team, Newbee Young.

During the first stage, four groups of four teams played each other in a round-robin. Matches were a best-of-three double elimination. The main stage was double-elimination, with best-of-three matches save for the grand finals, which was a best-of-five. The tournament was won by European team OG.

== Participating teams ==
Direct invitation

- CDEC Gaming
- Evil Geniuses
- Team Secret
- Invictus Gaming^{1}
- LGD Gaming
- Vega Squadron
- EHOME
- ViCi Gaming
- Virtus.Pro

Regional qualifiers

- OG (Europe)
- Alliance (Europe)
- Cloud9 (Americas)
- Unknown.xiu (Americas)
- Newbee (China)
- Newbee Young (China)^{1}
- Mineski (Southeast Asia)
- Fnatic (Southeast Asia)

^{1}Invictus Gaming was replaced by Newbee Young due to visa complications

== Results ==
(Note: Prizes are in USD)

Place	Team	Prize Money
1	OG	$1,110,000
2	Team Secret	$405,000
3	Evil Geniuses	$315,000
4	EHOME.cn	$255,000
5	CDEC Gaming	$202,500
5	Vici Gaming	$202,500
7	Virtus.pro	$105,000
7	LGD Gaming	$105,000
9-12	Alliance	$45,000
9-12	Mineski	$45,000
9-12	Team Unknown	$45,000
9-12	Vega Squadron	$45,000
13-16	Cloud9	$30,000
13-16	Fnatic	$30,000
13-16	Newbee	$30,000
13-16	Newbee Young	$30,000
