= Universe (gamer) =

American professional esports player

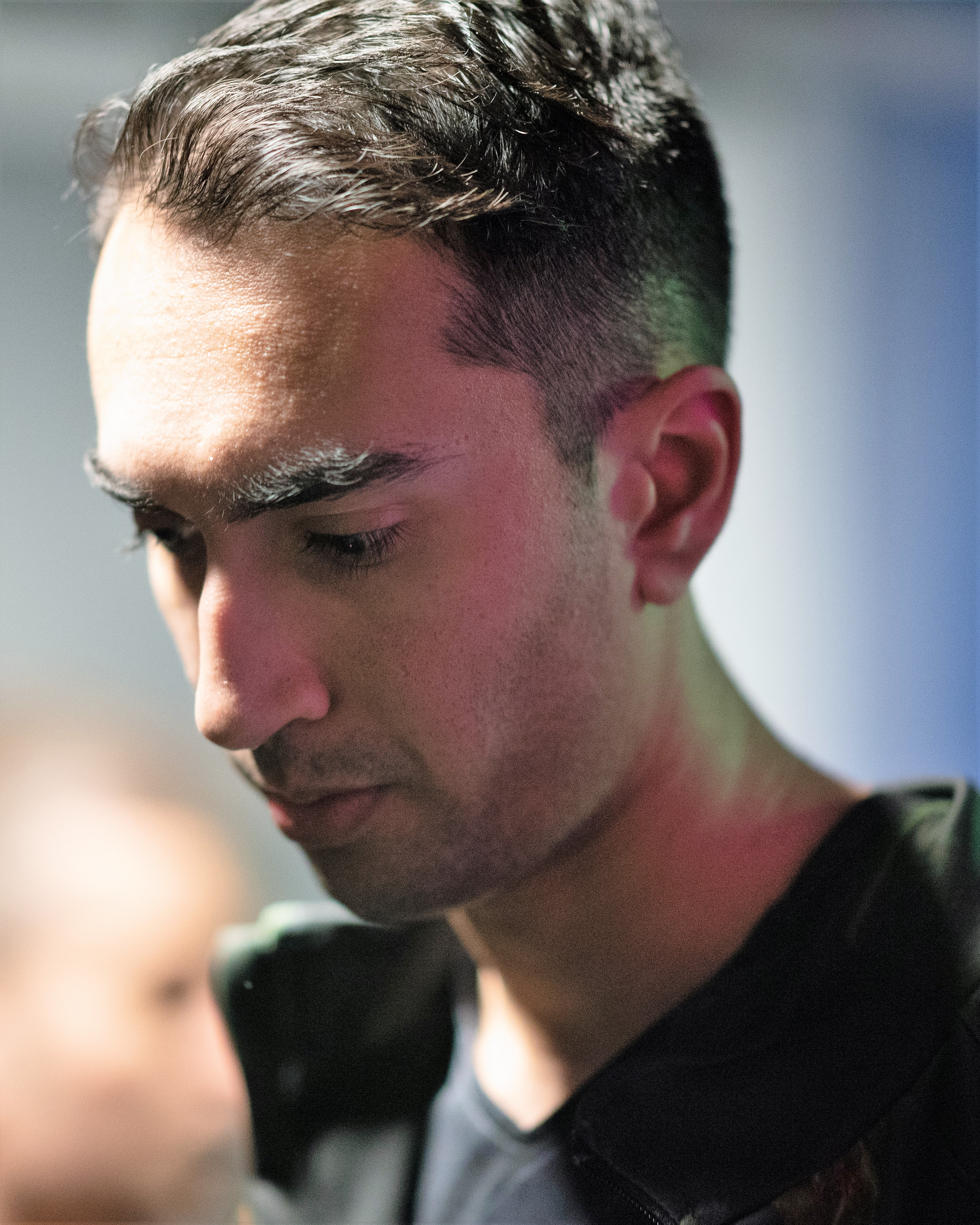
- Universe in 2018

Personal information
- Name: Saahil Arora
- Born: October 11, 1989 (age 37)
- Nationality: American

Career information
- Game: Dota 2
- Playing career: 2011–2020
- Role: Core/Support

Team history
- 2013: Team Dignitas
- 2013–2016: Evil Geniuses
- 2016: Team Secret
- 2016–2017: Evil Geniuses
- 2018: Fnatic
- 2018–2019: Forward Gaming
- 2019–2020: Ninjas in Pyjamas

Career highlights and awards
- The International champion (2015)

Saahil Arora (born October 11, 1989), better known as Universe, is an Indian American former professional Dota 2 player. He was a member of the Evil Geniuses team that won The International 2015.

== History ==
Universe is of Indian origin. He began his Dota career in 2011. Universe finished 9th at The International 2013 as a member of Team Dignitas. He finished 3rd at The International 2014 and won The International 2015, both as a member of Evil Geniuses (EG), and made the series-clinching play known as the "6 Million Dollar Echo Slam". EG also finished third at the Frankfurt Major 2015.

Evil Geniuses took third place at the Shanghai Major 2016. In March 2016, Arteezy and UNiVeRsE left the team to join Team Secret. He would then leave Team Secret to rejoin Evil Geniuses after the end of the Manila Major 2016 in June, effectively trading places with Sam "Bulba" Sosale.

Evil Geniuses also won the Manila Masters tournament in May 2017. Later on The International 2017 tournament, EG got a 9th-12th finish. During post-tournament shuffles, the team lost their support player Zai, who was replaced by former team member and coach Fear. Since leaving Evil Geniuses in 2017, he has played for Fnatic, Forward Gaming, and Ninjas in Pyjamas.

In April 2020, Universe retired from competitive Dota 2.
