= CDEC Gaming =

Chinese professional Dota 2 esports team

- Full name: Chinese Dota Elite Community
- Short name: CDEC, C-Dec
- Sport: Dota 2
- Founded: 2014
- Based in: Shanghai
- Colors: Fire engine red, White, Eminence

CDEC Gaming is a Chinese professional Dota 2 esports team based in Shanghai. The team placed second at The International 2015, which they qualified for with a wildcard. The achievement was considered a major upset. At TI CDEC also won their group stage and beat LGD Gaming and eventual winners Evil Geniuses in bracket. CDEC is an abbreviation for Chinese Dota Elite Community.

== History ==
On April 25, 2014, LGD Gaming announced that they would form a youth team called LGD.CDEC. They were named CDEC after the 'Chinese Dota Elite Community', an inhouse league in China. The team largely consisted of young talent from that league. In October 2014, LGD.CDEC left the LGD Gaming brand to establish a separate brand called CDEC Gaming, with the roster of Agressif, Maybe, 333, Garder and Q. CDEC showed promising signs of talent (especially Maybe, the team's mid player); however, following a disappointing 4th-place finish at the LAN finals of D2L Season 5, 333 left the team. He was temporarily replaced by the team's coach, former TyLoo and Vici Gaming player mikasa. CDEC were passed over for a direct invite to the Dota 2 Asia Championships and instead had to fight their way through the Asian Qualifiers where they came in second place. Despite their earlier promising results, they fared quite poorly at the group stage at DAC, where they were eliminated after placing 14th. Following DAC, the Chinese scene underwent a period of roster shuffles which resulted in mikasa leaving to coach LGD Gaming and up-and-coming mid player Maybe also leaving to play for LGD. The team soon added Shiki and Xz to complete their roster. In May 2015, CDEC were invited to play in The International 2015 Chinese Qualifiers. Despite not losing a single match in their group, CDEC failed to qualify directly to TI5 and instead were forced to go through the Wild Card. CDEC managed to defeat Vega Squadron and MVP Phoenix in order to secure one of the two wild card slots in the main event. During the group stage CDEC managed to surprise practically everyone as they fought their way to second place in their group, behind eventual champions Evil Geniuses. Despite their performance in their group, CDEC still came in as underdogs in the upper bracket; however, they shocked the world with their dominance on the main stage. CDEC went through the upper bracket without dropping a single game in any of the 3 series they played, which secured their place in the grand finals. In the grand finals CDEC faced Evil Geniuses and even though they had just beaten EG 2–0 in their previous series, CDEC lost the grand finals 1–3.

== Tournament results ==
- 13–16th – Dota 2 Asian Championships 2015
- 2nd – The International 2015
- 3rd – MLG World Finals 2015
- 5-6th – Frankfurt Major 2015
