= Shanghai Major =

2016 Dota 2 tournament

Tournament information
- Sport: Dota 2
- Location: Shanghai, China
- Dates: March 2–6, 2016
- Administrator: Valve
- Tournament format(s): Group stage Round robin Bracket; Double elimination
- Host: Perfect World
- Venue: Mercedes-Benz Arena
- Teams: 16 teams
- Purse: US$3,000,000

Final positions
- Champions: Team Secret
- 1st runner-up: Team Liquid
- 2nd runner-up: Evil Geniuses

The Shanghai Major was a Dota 2 tournament that took place in Shanghai from March 2–6, 2016, and was the second Major of the 2015–2016 Dota 2 season. 16 teams competed in the tournament; eight were given direct invitations and the other eight qualified through various qualifying tournament around the world. The Major was won by Team Secret, who defeated Team Liquid in a best of five series 3–1.

The tournament took place at the Mercedes-Benz Arena.

== Participating teams ==
Direct invitation

- Evil Geniuses
- OG
- Team Secret
- Alliance
- Virtus.Pro
- EHOME
- CDEC Gaming
- ViCi Gaming

Regional qualifiers

- LGD Gaming (China)
- Newbee (China)
- Team Archon (Americas)
- compLexity Gaming (Americas)
- Team Liquid (Europe)
- Team Spirit (Europe)
- MVP Phoenix (Southeast Asia)
- Fnatic (Southeast Asia)

== Results ==
(Note: Prizes are in USD)

Place	Team	Prize Money
1	Team Secret	$1,110,000
2	Team Liquid	$405,000
3	Evil Geniuses	$315,000
4	MVP Phoenix	$255,000
5-6	compLexity Gaming	$202,500
5-6	Fnatic	$202,500
7-8	OG	$105,000
7-8	Alliance	$105,000
9-12	EHOME.cn	$45,000
9-12	LGD Gaming	$45,000
9-12	Virtus.pro	$45,000
9-12	Newbee	$45,000
13-16	Team Archon	$30,000
13-16	Team Spirit	$30,000
13-16	Vici Gaming	$30,000
13-16	CDEC Gaming	$30,000

== Controversy ==
The Shanghai Major was plagued from the start with technical difficulties and both the production company and host, James "2GD" Harding, were publicly fired on the second day by Gabe Newell in a Reddit post. Despite this, the tournament continued to experience production issues and unexpected delays, as well as less than favorable conditions for the players and broadcasters.

Even after the event finished, controversy persisted. The hotel rooms the teams had stayed in were cleaned out, with a total of 40-50 personal belongings being lost or misplaced, including mice, keyboards, headsets, and car keys.
