= Dendi (gamer) =

Ukrainian esports player (born 1989)

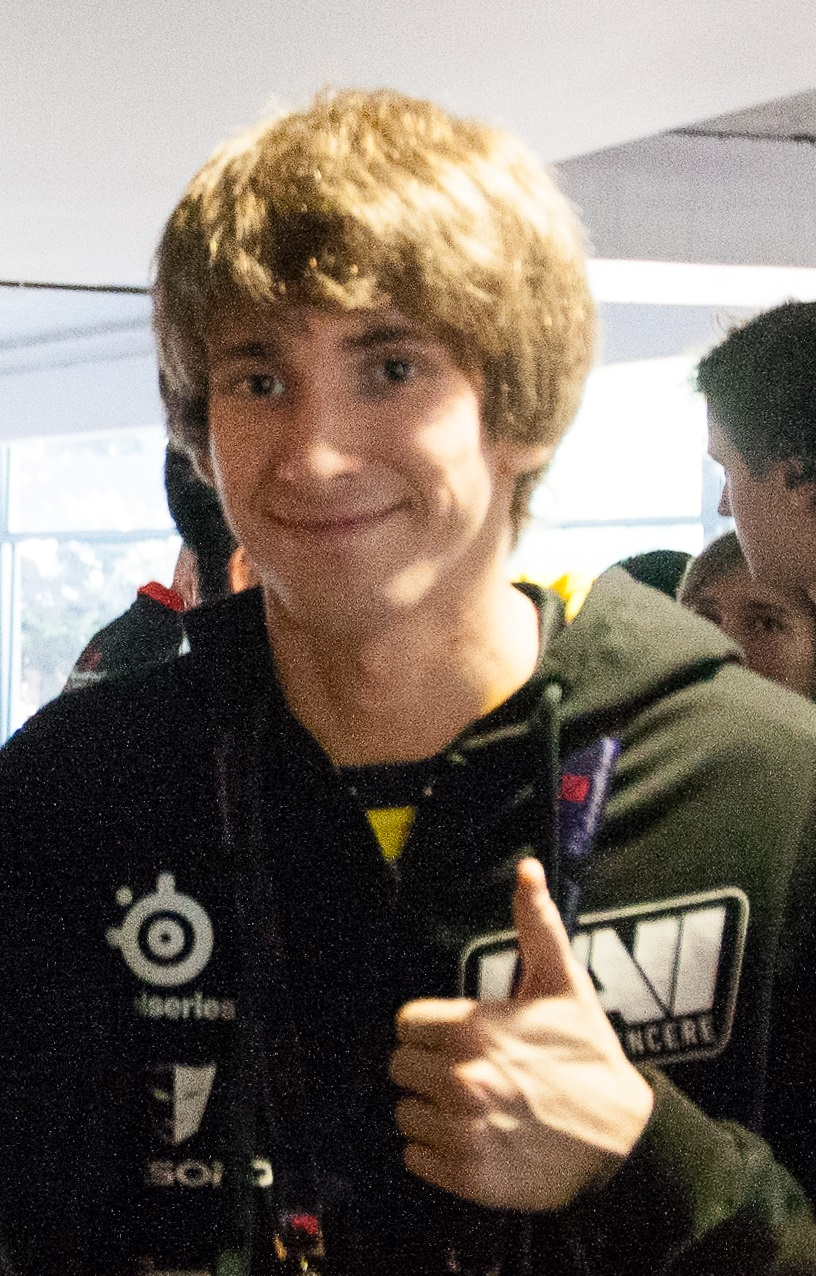
- Dendi with Na'Vi in 2014

Personal information
- Name: Danil Ishutin
- Born: 30 December 1989 (age 36); Lviv, Ukrainian SSR, Soviet Union
- Nationality: Ukrainian

Current team
- Team: B8
- Game: Dota 2

Career information
- Games: Defense of the Ancients; Dota 2
- Playing career: 2006–present

Team history
- 2006–2008: Wolker Gaming (WG)
- 2008-2009: Kingsurf.int
- 2009–2010: DTS Gaming
- 2010–2018: Natus Vincere
- 2019: Tigers
- 2020–present: B8

Career highlights and awards
- The International champion (2011)

Danil Ishutin (Ukrainian: Данило Ішутін; born 30 December 1989), better known as Dendi, is a Ukrainian professional Dota 2 player. He is best known for his time with Natus Vincere (Na'Vi) in the 2010s, where he was a member of the team that won The International 2011. He left Na'Vi in 2018 and formed his own Dota 2 organization in 2020, B8.

== Early years ==
Dendi was born in Lviv, Ukraine, on 30 December 1989. As a child, at the insistence of his mother-musician, he played the piano, and participated in acrobatics and dancing. The first computer in Dendi's house was his brother's, who did not allow him to play for a long time. The gaming world was opened to him by Quake and Doom. Dendi later began playing Warcraft III at local computer clubs. Dendi's total fascination with computer games was influenced by the death of his father from cancer. Dendi graduated from the Ukrainian Academy of Printing in 2011.

== Career ==
In 2006, Dendi started playing DotA professionally with WG. He was a part of the Ukrainian squad that finished third in MYM Prime Nations the same year. Only a few months later, WG made it to the grand final of one of the most prestigious tournaments that existed at the time, MYM Prime Defending. When Kingsurf.international merged with WG the next year, he became a full-time member of Ks.int. In late 2008, he joined DTS in its early stages, only to return to Ks.int in March 2009. Only three months later he returned to DTS, helping them secure a second-place victory at ESWC 2010. At the end of the year, Dendi achieved arguably the greatest success in his DotA career by finishing 3rd place in the most stacked tournament at the time, WDC 2010. Dendi joined Natus Vincere (Na'Vi) at the end of 2010, together with ArtStyle.

Dendi began his Dota 2 career with the Ukrainian team, Na'Vi, rapidly rising to fame after winning The International 2011. In the following years, Na'Vi continued to win many tournaments, including runner's up at The International 2012. At The International 2013, Na'Vi became the only team to participate in the grand finals of the prestigious tournament three years in a row, eventually losing to Alliance 3-2 in the grand finals.

Dendi was one of three Dota 2 players featured in the 2014 documentary Free to Play, which covered his story leading up to and including his performance at The International 2011.

At The International 2017, Dendi played in two live one-on-one demonstration matches against an OpenAI machine-learned bot, losing both. In September 2018, he was taken off Na'Vi's active roster before being officially released from his contract a year later. In January 2020, Dendi announced the formation of his own organization, B8.
