= MVP (esports) =

South Korean esports organization

- Divisions: Counter-Strike: Global Offensive; Honor of Kings; League of Legends; Overwatch; PlayerUnknown's Battlegrounds; Starcraft 2 Heroes
- Founded: October 15, 2010
- Folded: December 2, 2019
- Location: South Korea
- CEO: Choi "Hyunmoo" Yoon-sang
- COO: Lim "Dopani" Hyeon-seok
- CBO: Yang "Can Yang" Seon-il

MVP is professional esports organization in South Korea with teams competing in Counter-Strike: Global Offensive, Honor of Kings, League of Legends, Overwatch, and PlayerUnknown's Battlegrounds It formerly had players competing in Dota 2, Heroes of the Storm, and StarCraft II: Wings of Liberty

MVP's League of Legends team formerly competed in the League of Legends Champions Korea (LCK), the highest level of professional League of Legends in South Korea, before being relegated in late 2018 to the secondary league, Challengers Korea (CK).

== Dota 2 ==
MVP previously had four Dota 2 teams: MVP Phoenix, MVP HOT6ix, MVP Aegis, and MVP Revolution. MVP Phoenix was the primary Dota team and the last to disband when it did so on January 9, 2017.

=== Tournament results ===
- 7–8th — The International 2015
- 5–6th — MLG World Finals 2015
- 4th — Game Show Global eSports Cup Season 1
- 4th — Shanghai Major 2016
- 1st — Dota Pit League Season 4
- 1st — WePlay Dota 2 League Season 3
- 6th — Manila Major 2016
- 5–6th — The International 2016

== League of Legends ==
MVP
- Game: League of Legends
- Founded: May 7, 2012
- Folded: December 2, 2019
- League: Challengers Korea; LCK (formerly)
- Team history: MVP White/Blue/Red (2012–2013); MVP Ozone (2013); MVP (2013–2019)
- Based in: Seoul, South Korea
- Head coach: Kwon "Hell" Jae-hwan
- Manager: Shin "Flyn Shin" Dong-geun
- Championships: 1

=== History ===
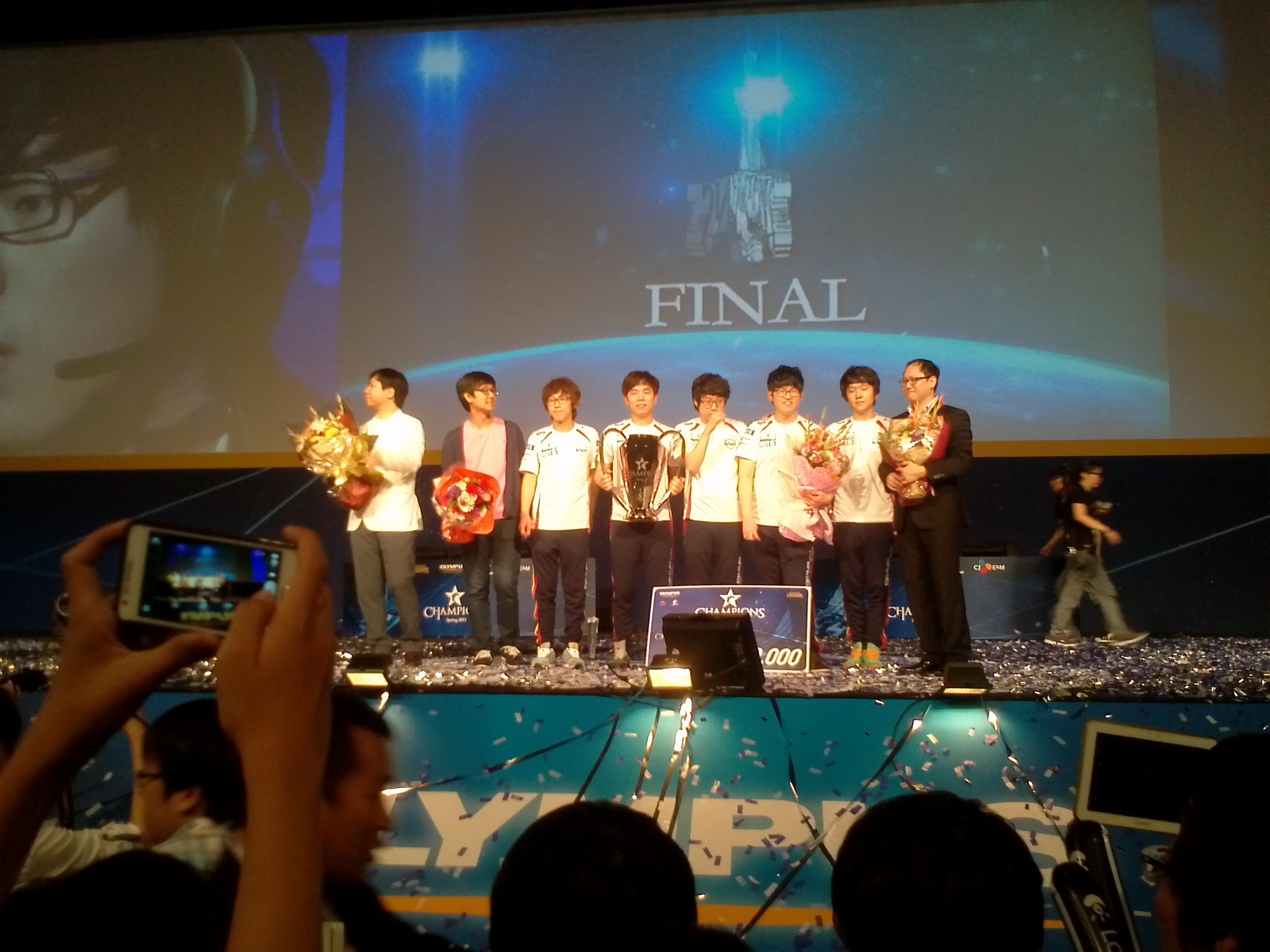
MVP Ozone after winning Champions Spring

MVP joined the professional League of Legends scene on May 7, 2012, when it formed three teams: MVP White, MVP Blue, and MVP Red. MVP Red disbanded a few months later, but MVP White and MVP Blue went on to participate in multiple seasons of the Champions league. In February 2013, the organization shuffled the rosters of the two teams, and MVP White (now renamed to MVP Ozone) became the flagship team. With a roster consisting of top laner Yoon "Homme" Sung-young, jungler Choi "DanDy" In-kyu, mid laner Bae "Dade" Eo-jin, bot laner Gu "imp" Seung-bin, and support Cho "Mata" Se-hyeong, MVP Ozone won Champions Spring 2013 with a 3–0 sweep of CJ Blaze in the finals. In September 2013, Samsung Electronics acquired both MVP rosters, forming Samsung Ozone and Samsung Blue.

MVP announced in November 2015 that it would return to League of Legends, and in December they announced a new roster of relatively unknown players: top laner Kang "ADD" Geon-mo, Kim "Beyond" Kyu-seok, mid laner An "Ian" Jun-hyeong, bot laner Oh "MaHa" Hyun-sik, and support Cha "ChaResh" In-myeong.
