= Evil Geniuses =

American esports organization based in Seattle, Washington

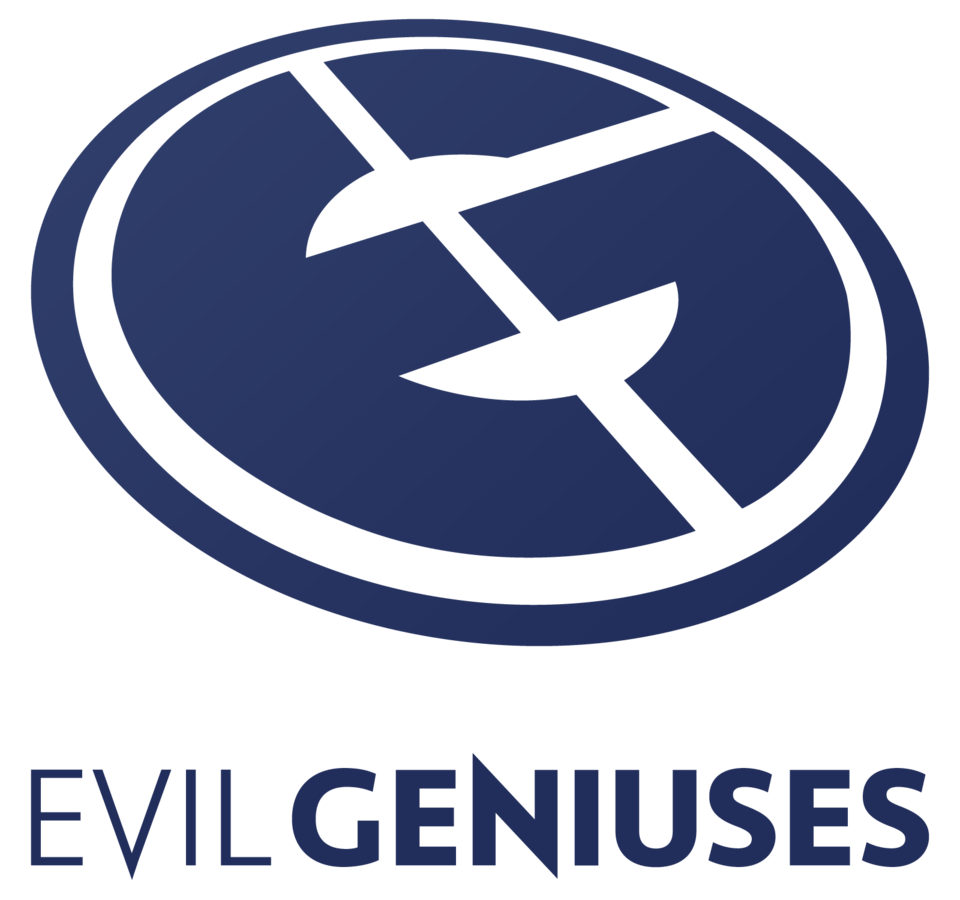
- Short name: EG
- Founded: 1999; 27 years ago
- Folded: 2 November 2026; 12 days ago
- Based in: Seattle, Washington, United States
- CEO: Chris DeAppolonio (Interim)
- Manager: Matthew Speidel (Head of Gaming)
- Parent group: PEAK6
- Website: www.evilgeniuses.gg

Evil Geniuses (EG) was an American esports organization based in Seattle, Washington. Founded in 1999, the organization had fielded players in various fighting games, Call of Duty, Counter-Strike: Global Offensive, Delta Force, Dota 2, Fortnite Battle Royale, Halo, League of Legends, Pokémon Unite, Valorant, StarCraft II, Rocket League, Tom Clancy's Rainbow Six Siege, and World of Warcraft.

In May 2019, EG was acquired by PEAK6, a Chicago-based investment company. While independently owned at the time of the acquisition, it was formerly a subsidiary of GoodGame Agency, which in turn was owned by Amazon.com through its division Twitch.

EG's Dota 2 team won The International 2015, receiving more than $6.6 million, the largest prize payout in esports history at the time. Their Call of Duty: WWII team won the 2018 Call of Duty Championship. Their Valorant team won the 2023 Valorant Champions.

In October 2026, EG announced that it will be ceasing all operations on November 2, 2026, after failing to retain VCT partnership status in Valorant.

== History ==
Evil Geniuses was founded as a Quake clan in Victoria, British Columbia, Canada, in 1997. Playing from the first cyber cafe in Victoria, the Underground Onramp, the original roster included Dakine, MikeJ, Killboy, Zakath, Muppetman, Jello and the EG girls featured in Wired Magazine, Jasp and Mystique. The Onramp and the EG clan were very popular in the emerging gaming circuit, being on the West Coast and having access to a T1 internet connection while the rest of the world was still on dial-up.

Many new members located in Seattle joined the clan and would regularly spar with members of DR including the world's first pro gamer, Thresh.

Members from both the Canadian and American roster were present during the 1997 Gameworks Tournament with access to the gaming lounge. Canadian players were not admitted into the tournament at the time due to the nascent pro gaming circuit, but were allowed to warm up with the contestants.

When the Underground Onramp closed, shortly after the release of modern home broadband internet, most of the Canadian roster went on to new careers, some into game development and still work in the gaming industry to this day. Meanwhile, the American roster flourished and went on to become one of the greatest gaming clans in the history of esports.

Philadelphia native and future CEO Alex Garfield started working for the team in 2004.

Evil Geniuses expanded into World of Warcraft (WoW) Arena by acquiring HukHukHukHukHuk in 2007. The roster consisted of many notable players including Abdul "Bokas" Suleiman, Garett "Garett" Llorent, Jesse "Koorban" Ryan, John "Nuvas" Liao, Einar "Spinister" Galilea, Brian "Tyz" Gustafson, Cyrus "Morifen" Foroughi, Anthony "Neia" Krug, and Paul "Zsu" Coats. In 2008, Evil Geniuses later acquired Issac "Azeal" Cummings-Bentley, Conrad "Zyz" Lope, Dan "spoh" Street, Emerson "Woundman" Condon, Charles "Cdew" Dewland, and Tim "Kollektiv" Yen, forming a new 3v3 arena team, as most of the previous team retired from competitive play. Notable accomplishments including winning the 2007 US Arena Championship, placing 3rd at Blizzcon 2007 (World Arena Championship), winning MLG San Diego 2008, placing 4th at Blizzcon 2012, and winning the Intel Extreme Masters IV WoW World Championship (2010).

Evil Geniuses acquired a Defense of the Ancients (Dota) roster on April 12, 2008, made up of players transferring from team eMg. EG entered the StarCraft: Brood War scene on April 25, 2009, with the recruitment of World Cyber Games USA champions Geoff "iNcontroL" Robinson, and Dan "Nyoken" Eidson, along with Eric "G5" Rothmuller, Jake "LzGaMeR" Winstead, and Bryce "Machine" Bates. EG saw its North American DotA squad depart on December 3, 2009, following two months of minimal practice and insufficient exposure.

Evil Geniuses expanded into StarCraft II during the game's launch year of 2010 with the recruitment of top American player Gregory "IdrA" Fields as well as the well-known commentator and player Nick "Tasteless" Plott on September 9. In a controversial move, EG acquired the brand of fellow North American gaming organization, Loaded, on October 9, 2010, but the deal only constituted the company sponsors, team owner and their Heroes of Newerth squad.

In 2010, EG expanded into fighting games by signing Justin Wong and Martin "Marn" Phan. Within a year, they expanded their fighting game division with the addition of Ricki Ortiz, Ari "fLoE" Weintraub, and Eduardo "PR Balrog" Perez-Frangie, as well as Japanese players Yusuke Momochi, and Yuka "Chocoblanka" Kusachi. Marn was eventually let go in 2011 at his own request, with the intention to start his own League of Legends team, Team MRN.

On March 31, 2011, long-time member Manuel "Grubby" Schenkhuizen, as well as StarCraft II division manager Nick "Tasteless" Plott departed from the organization. EG lost its Heroes of Newerth squad on July 8 to SK Gaming, due to sponsorship complications. Near the end of that month, the Korean North American Star League champion, Ho Joon "PuMa" Lee, joined up with EG, despite the lack of consultancy with his previous organization. Three weeks later, the top Canadian player, Chris "HuK" Loranger, left his long-time organization of Team Liquid, and joined EG, to compete alongside Fields and Lee in South Korea. On October 21, it was announced that the trio would be moving to stay with the South Korean team SlayerS, in accordance with a correlating partnership established between the organizations. EG saw the return of two former DotA players, Clinton "Fear" Loomis and Jimmy "DeMoN" Ho, with the acquisition of their first Dota 2 squad.

On January 7, 2012, EG announced the dismissal of its long-standing Counter-Strike squad, though star player Jordan "n0thing" Gilbert initially stayed on to produce content related to the game. In September 2012, Bulba and xHobbzeEx left the Dota 2 team due to personal issues and were replaced by Jio "Jeyo" Madayag and Robert "bdiz" Tinnes. On December 5, 2012, EG signed the successful StarCraft: Brood War Zerg player Lee Jae-Dong. On January 25, 2013, EG announced their expansion into League of Legends with the signing of the former Counter Logic Gaming European division – in negotiations that reportedly spanned three months, however the team would later disband due to extremely poor results.

On April 4, 2014, EG announced that they had signed fighting game player Kenneth "K-Brad" Bradley. Prior to this, Ari "fLoE" Weintraub had been let go from the team.

On October 27, 2014, it was announced that three players from the Evil Geniuses Call of Duty squad, Patrick "Aches" Price, Ian "Crimsix" Porter, and Ken Dedo, had left the organisation, later joining OpTic Gaming. The CEO of EG, Alex Garfield confirmed via reddit that he had indeed let three of the players go to OpTic.

On November 21, 2014, Evil Geniuses announced the launch of its first Halo squad, consisting of the twins Jason "Lunchbox" Brown and Justin "Roy" Brown, the 2014 Halo 4 World Championship finalist Justin "iGotUrPistola" Deese and the Eric "Snip3down" Wrona, who is reckoned among the best slayers in the world. The team competed in the Halo Championship Series Season 1 and won 3 online cups to this point. On December 21 iGotUrPistola left the squad due to an injury. He was replaced by Tony "LxthuL" Campbell transferring from the BTH.

On December 9, 2014, Evil Geniuses' parent organisation, GoodGame Agency announced that it had been acquired by Twitch.

On December 16, 2014, Evil Geniuses' Yusuke Momochi won the 2014 Capcom Cup tournament. Momochi has qualified for the event by winning South East Asia Major 2014 in Singapore. This win automatically granted him entry into Capcom Cup 2015. On July 19, 2015, Yusuke Momochi won Evolution 2015, taking the win from AVerMedia's Bruce "Gamerbee" Hsiang in a controversial Grand Finals set that saw Momochi suffer from hardware failure with his Razer arcade stick.

On December 12, 2016, Evil Geniuses along with Alliance became player-owned organizations. It was later confirmed that American Dota 2 player Peter "ppd" Dager was named CEO of Evil Geniuses.

At the beginning of 2017, ppd announced lineup switches for the fighting game and StarCraft II divisions. PR Balrog, Justin Wong, Momochi, and ChocoBlanka would depart from the FGC division; Ricki Ortiz, PPMD, and K-Brad would be kept while adding NYChrisG to the team. In addition, ppd announced that their SC2 division would be disbanding as InControL and HuK were released.

On March 24, 2017, Evil Geniuses entered into the Smash Bros. for Wii U scene by acquiring Julian "Zinoto" Carrington.

On November 10, 2017, Evil Geniuses announced that the organization had entered Tom Clancy's Rainbow Six: Siege by signing the former Continuum roster.

On April 12, 2019, Evil Geniuses entered Fortnite Battle Royale by signing Jordan "JTruth" Clouse and Chance "MoNsTcR" Duncan.

In late August 2019, Peter Chau, Troy "Canadian" Jaroslawski, and Aaron "Gotcha" Chung all left the Evil Geniuses Rainbow Six Siege division. Morquis "Modigga" Hribar joined the team as a player.

On September 26, 2019, the team confirmed their return to Counter-Strike, signing the roster of NRG Esports. The Evil Geniuses would shock the Counter Strike: Global Offensive scene by winning their first big event together, ESL One New York 2019.

On April 15, 2020, Evil Geniuses released their Rainbow Six Siege team and exited the scene.

On March 30, 2021, Evil Geniuses partnered with American apparel company POINT3.

In April 2021, Evil Geniuses partnered with cryptocurrency company Coinbase.

On May 23, 2023, Evil Geniuses partnered with crypto casino Thunderpick.

On October 20, 2026, Evil Geniuses announced on X that it will be ceasing operations on November 2, citing limited sponsorships and rising costs. This followed the organization failing to retain its partnership status in VCT Americas for the 2027 and 2028 seasons.

== Former divisions ==
=== Rocket League ===
During September 2021, Evil Geniuses announced their return to the RLCS.

On October 5, they announced the signing of "German Amigos" consisting of Leonardo “Catalysm” Crist Ramos, Ivan “ivn” Sabri, Riccardo “Rizex45” Mazzotta and coach Kuno “Mumen” Hildebrandt. On September 30 Rizex45 and Mumen were released. On October 3 Damian "Tox" Schäfer was signed as a player with John "Virge" Willis as coach.

On January 26, 2023, Evil Geniuses announced that they were leaving Rocket League.

=== Dota 2 ===
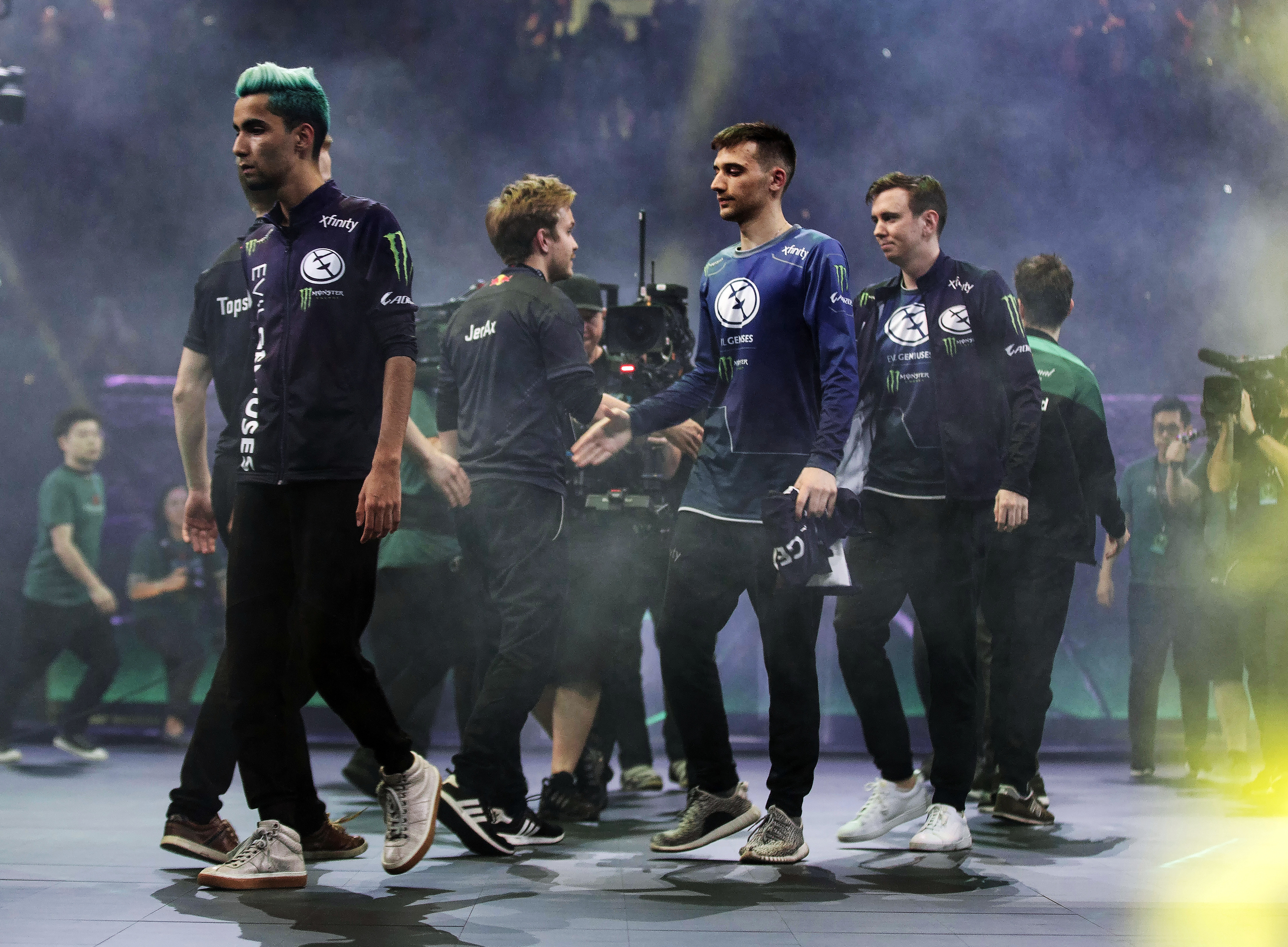
Evil Geniuses' post-match handshake with OG at The International 2018

After the International 2011, Evil Geniuses announced their new Dota 2 team in October 2011. This roster included Clinton "Fear" Loomis, Rasmus Berth "MiSeRy" Filipsen, Jimmy "DeMoN" Ho, Amel "PlaymatE' Barudzija, and Pers Anders Olsson "Pajkatt" Lille.

EG acquired Kurtis "Aui_2000" Ling from Cloud9 in December 2014 and Sumail from Pakistan. On August 8, 2015, Evil Geniuses beat CDEC Gaming to win The International 2015, securing a first-time championship and winning a total of US$6,616,014, which was one of the largest purses ever awarded in esports. They were also the first American-based team to win the event. A week later, Aui_2000 was released from his contract with the team, with former member Arteezy replacing him on the roster.

EG finished third at both the Frankfurt Major 2015 and the Shanghai Major 2016. On March 22, Arteezy and UNiVeRsE left the team to join Team Secret. On March 25, EG announced that former members Aui_2000 and Bulba would rejoin the roster to fill these vacancies.

EG placed third at The International 2016. After the tournament the team released ppd and Fear, who both decided to retire from playing Dota 2 to pursue other opportunities within the organization. They were replaced by Andreas Franck "Cr1t-" Nielsen, who would go on to become the new captain, and Arteezy.

Following their elimination at The International 2017 in August, Ludwig "zai" Wåhlberg departed Evil Geniuses, saying he would seek new options about his career. Shortly after, Peter "ppd" Dager stepped down as CEO and was replaced by former team manager, Philip Aram. The following month, Evil Geniuses announced that Clinton "Fear" Loomis would come out of his coaching role to rejoin the team as an active player.

In December 2017, EG announced that they would be releasing UNiVeRsE and their head coach, SVG. They would pick up Rasmus "Misery" Filipsen and Sam "Bulba" Sosale to replace them, respectively. In May 2018, EG announced the acquisition of former OG players s4 and Fly after releasing Fear and Misery from their contracts. Shannon Larkin was added as the Dota team's manager in June 2018, in time for the team's participation in Dota Summit 9, which they would win.

After adding two of Dota 2's most accomplished players, EG headed to The International 2018 in Vancouver, Canada. After a successful group stage where they went 13–3, the joint highest record with Team Liquid. They defeated Team Secret 2–0 in the upper bracket, before setting up a grudge match with OG. The series went to three games, eventually culminating in EG's defeat as they fell to the lower bracket. They continued eliminating tournament favorites in Virtus.pro and Team Liquid, before bowing out to PSG.LGD and taking third place and more than US$2.6 million in prize money.

As of November 15, 2022, Evil Geniuses has ceased operations in the North American Dota Scene, and has switched operations to the South America region, according to a tweet by CEO Nicole LaPointe.

As of November 1, 2023, Evil Geniuses releases its roster.

=== Counter-Strike ===
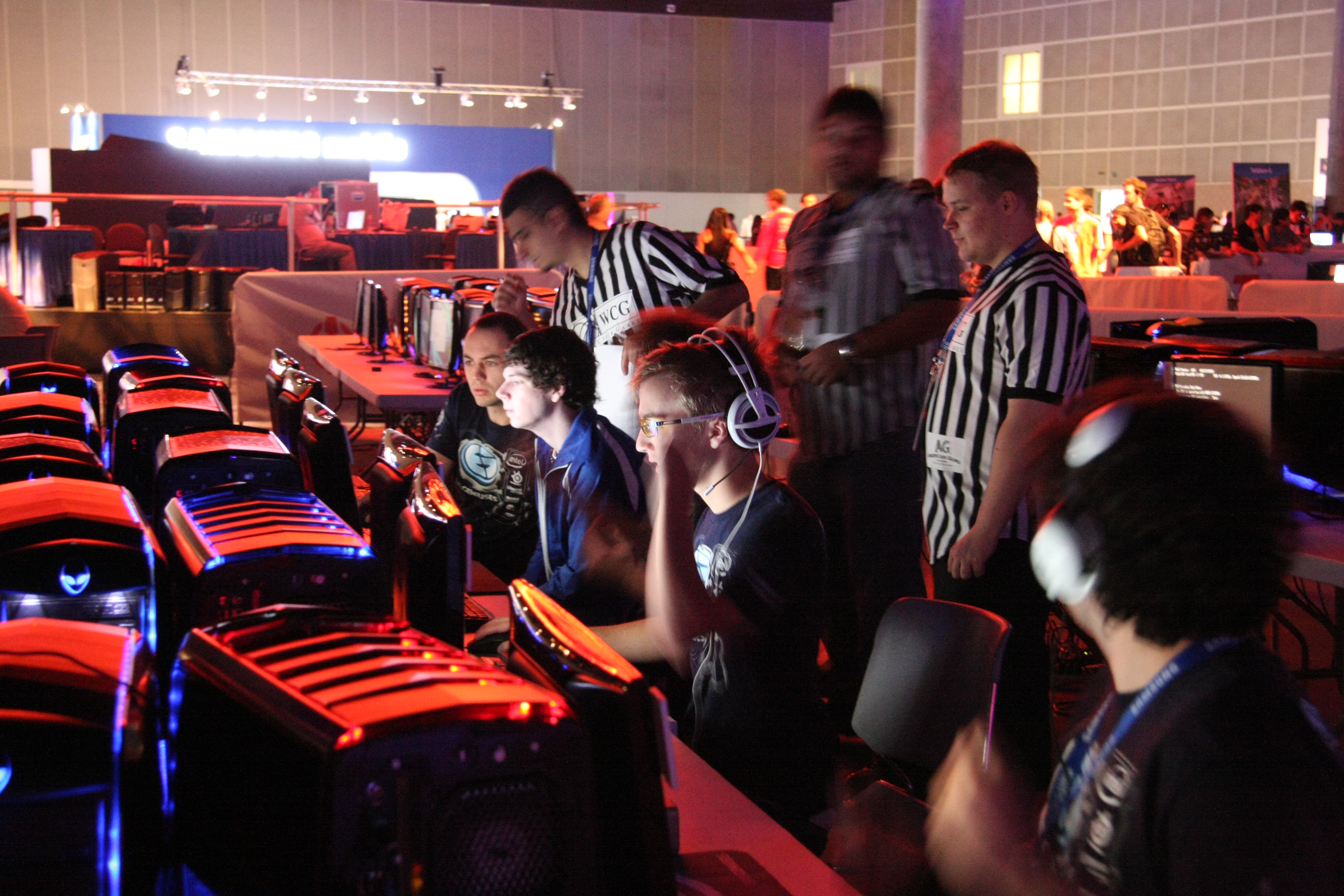
Evil Geniuses Counter-Strike division playing at the World Cyber Games 2010

EG had multiple Counter-Strike Source teams during the late 2000s and early 2010s.

In September 2019, Evil Geniuses acquired the Counter-Strike: Global Offensive (CSGO) team of NRG Esports the day before ESL One New York 2019. The original team consisted of Peter "stanislaw" Jarguz, Tarik "tarik" Celik, Vincent "Brehze" Cayonte, Ethan "Ethan" Arnold, Tsvetelin "CeRq" Dimitrov, and Chet "ImAPet" Singh as coach. At ESL One New York, EG was in Group B, alongside Danish superstars Astralis, FaZe Clan, and OpTic Gaming. EG's opening match was against FaZe Clan, in which they won 2–0. The following match was against Astralis, in which EG defeated them 2–0, something they have done only twice before and qualified for the playoffs. Evil Geniuses defeated G2 Esports 2–0. In the Grand Final, Evil Geniuses faced Astralis again, this time in a best of five. EG took the first map 16–3 and the second map 16–12. Unfortunately, on match point, EG choked a 4-round lead after reaching 15–11 and eventually lost the map 20–22. The next map, after struggling in the first half, EG won 16–8 and won the series 3–1. Brehze was named MVP of the event. At DreamHack Masters Malmö 2019, Evil Geniuses placed last alongside North, TyLoo, and fellow North Americans, Team Envy.

At StarSeries i-League CS:GO Season 8, located in Belek, Turkey, Evil Geniuses faced unknown Chinese 5Power Gaming in the opening match, where they won 2–0 relatively easily, though the team would fail to take two maps away from Swedish Ninjas in Pyjamas (NiP), forcing the EG into the losers bracket. In the losers bracket, the team would defeat Heroic after narrowly losing the first map but taking the next two with little struggle. EG took a solid victory against Furia 2–0 then took revenge against NiP by defeating the Swedes 2–0, progressing to the upper bracket. Evil defeated Renegades (which later became 100 Thieves) 2–0, taking the first map easily but struggling slightly more on the second. EG would next play Fnatic in the upper bracket finals. After a terrible first map losing 16–2, EG took the next two maps and booked a spot in the grand finals, facing the winner of the losers bracket, Fnatic once again. In the grand final, EG played extremely well, making a tremendous comeback from a 9–0 deficit to win the first map 16–12 and win the second map much more decisively with a 16–9 score. Ethan was named MVP of the event

On January 12, 2024, Evil Geniuses announced that they were leaving Counter-Strike.

=== League of Legends ===
In September 2019, Evil Geniuses announced it would be reentering League of Legends by buying out the League of Legends Championship Series (LCS) slot left open following the departure of Echo Fox.

During November, Evil Geniuses announced the signing of Dennis "Svenskeren" Johnsen, Tristan "Zeyzal" Stidam and Colin "Kumo" Zhao of Cloud9, Bae "Bang" Jun-sik of 100 Thieves, Daniele "Jiizuke" di Mauro of Team Vitality and Heo "Irean" Yeong-chol of Counter Logic Gaming as the Head Coach. They ended the Spring Split in 3rd place, losing to FlyQuest in the playoffs with a final score of 1–3.

In the 2022 spring split, the team placed fourth in the regular season with a .500 record of 9–9, and played against the first seed Team Liquid in the first round of playoffs, falling 3–2. The team then went on to complete a lower bracket run all the way to the Grand Finals, including a decisive 3–0 win against Team Liquid. In the Grand Finals, Evil Geniuses beat 100 Thieves 3–0 to win their first LCS Championship as an organization. They went on to finish 3–4th at the 2022 Mid-Season Invitational, losing 3–0 against eventual champions Royal Never Give Up. Keeping the same roster for the summer split, Evil Geniuses finished 3rd following a 3–2 loss against 100 Thieves.

Following the 2022 World Championship, where the team placed finished 11th–14th with a 1/5 group stage record, Evil Geniuses released their coaches Peter Dun, Artemis, Rigby, Artemis, and Academy head coach ZzLegendary. It was later announced that Impact also left the team.

On November 20, 2023, Evil Geniuses announced that they were leaving League of Legends and would not compete in the 2024 LCS season.

=== Fortnite Battle Royale ===
In early 2019, Evil Geniuses acquired a Fortnite Battle Royale team. The team was released in June 2020.

=== Overwatch ===
In July 2017, Evil Geniuses announced that they would be releasing their Overwatch team just two months after it was originally formed.

=== PlayerUnknown's Battlegrounds ===
In October 2017, Evil Geniuses acquired a PUBG team. After many changes throughout the following year, Evil Geniuses dropped the team in December 2018.

=== Tom Clancy's Rainbow Six Siege ===
In November 2017, the team announced that they had acquired the roster for the Rainbow Six Pro League team of Continuum shortly before the Year 2 Season 3 Finals. It included Troy "Canadian" Jaroslawski, Nathan "nvK" Valenti, Austin "Yung" Trexler, Brandon "BC" Carr, Ammar “Necrox” Albanna, and Jordan “BKN” Soojian as the team's Coach.

At the Year 2 Season 3 Finals in São Paulo, Brazil, EG placed 5–8th after losing to eventual champions ENCE Esports in the quarter finals. In February 2018, the team placed second to PENTA Sports in the Six Invitational 2018, the Rainbow Six Siege world championship. BKN would be released from the team on August 30 after placing second to G2 Esports, who picked up the former PENTA roster, in the Six Major Paris 2018. Necrox was later moved to the coach role as the team acquired Emilio "Geoometrics" Leynez Cuevas on September 3. Peter Chao also became manager of the Rainbow Six Siege team the same day. BC retired from a playing role on September 20, bringing Necrox back to a player role. On October 12, Aaron "Gotcha" Chung filled the empty spot of coach for the team and often played when another member of the team was unable to play.

In August 2019, Evil Geniuses would fall in the group stages of the Six Major Raleigh 2019 stunning fans and opponents. After a disappointing run in the Six Major Raleigh, Peter Chao, Gotcha, and Canadian all left the team, supporting the rumors of a potential change. To replace Canadian as a player, Morquis "Modigga" Hribar joined EG from Gotcha's former team, Disrupt Gaming. Ryan Towey also replaced Peter Chao as Manager. Canadian joined Spacestation Gaming and Gotcha joined Team SoloMid (TSM). EG performed relatively badly in the second half of Pro League Season 10, tying to Susquehanna Soniqs, Rogue, losing to Luminosity Gaming, placing 3rd failing to reach the Pro League Season 10 Finals in Tokoname, Japan.

In November, Geoometrics left to join TSM and was replaced by Gotcha as a player. Tristan "Ranger" Pehrson, the former coach of Rogue, joined as a coach.

On April 15, 2020, Evil Geniuses released the roster.

=== Valorant ===
On January 27, 2021, Evil Geniuses entered Valorant with their first roster consisting of Temperature, aleksandar, Osias, clawdia and Potter.

On September 21, 2022, they were selected as a partner to compete in the Valorant Champions Tour Americas League. The starting roster consisted of Alexander "jawgemo" Mor, Corbin "C0M" Lee, Ethan "Ethan" Arnold, Kelden "Boostio" Pupello, and Brendan "BcJ" Jensen, with Potter as coach. Evil Geniuses also harbored a "reserve" roster consisting of Vincent "Apoth" Le, Jeffrey "reformed" Lu, Max "Demon1" Mazanov, Kyle "ScrewFace" Jensen, and Jacob "icy" Lange.

In the 2023 Valorant Champions Tour (VCT) season, Evil Geniuses faced a series of challenges that led to their unfavorable status as the Valorant Champions Tour progressed. With a 1–4 record to begin the season, the team struggled to gain momentum. Following their poor start, the team underwent a roster overhaul, moving BcJ to the reserve roster and Demon1 to the starting roster. In spite of their poor beginning, as well as an unprecedented 0–13 loss on a map against LOUD, Evil Geniuses narrowly managed to secure a spot in the Americas League playoffs. Against all odds, the team performed well enough in the playoffs to qualify for Masters Tokyo and 2023 Valorant Champions later that year. At Masters Tokyo, Evil Geniuses performed above expectations, defeating both Americas League champions LOUD and Pacific League champions Paper Rex. Evil Geniuses were able to achieve an impressive second-place finish, losing only to Fnatic 0–3 in the Grand Finals.

During Champions 2023, Evil Geniuses, now strong contenders to win the event, began a flawless run up to the Upper Finals, where they would face off against a familiar rival in Paper Rex. In a tight map three in which they barely lost in overtime, Evil Geniuses were sent to the lower finals, where they would then clinch a narrow 3–2 win against defending champions LOUD, advancing to the Grand Finals once again in a rematch against Paper Rex. Evil Geniuses ended up winning the series with a 3–1 score, completing the Cinderella run and becoming the first North American team to win Valorant Champions.

Following an announcement in which Evil Geniuses' players were met with a decision to either explore new options or come back with pay cuts, the championship-winning roster ultimately disbanded; only Jawgemo and potter opted to remain with EG. The rest of the roster were spread out among teams including NRG, 100 Thieves, and LEVIATÁN. On January 26, 2024, Evil Geniuses revealed their new roster consisting of jawgemo, Apoth, Derrek, supamen, and NaturE, with potter as head coach and Mike "pho" Panza as assistant coach.

After placing 9th in Stage 2 of the 2024 VCT season and failing to qualify for any of the year's international tournaments, Evil Geniuses parted ways with jawgemo and Apoth, the former of which signed with G2 Esports. In their place, the organization signed Jacob "icy" Lange from G2 Esports and Jaccob "yay" Whiteaker, known for his time with Envy/OpTic Gaming, for 2025.

Going into the 2026 VCT season, following a 7-8th finish in Stage 2 of the 2025 season, Evil Geniuses let go of all of their players except Supamen. The organization then signed C0M, Okeanos, and assistant coach meco1e after they were let go from Leviatán, marking the former's return to the organization after winning Champions in 2023, as well as bao and dgzin, who had played in regional Challengers leagues the year prior. The organization also signed an Academy roster to play in the 2026 Challengers North America season consisting of jakee, mitch, Paincakes, stunna, and zerona, with Faded as head coach. Evil Geniuses failed to qualify for any of the year's international tournaments again, finishing 7th in Kickoff and Stage 2 and 11th in Stage 1.

==== Final roster ====
Evil Geniuses Valorant roster
Players
Coaches

Handle	Name	Nationality
bao	Nguyen, Bao	Vietnam
zerona	Varela, Javan	Mexico
Paincakes	Hass, Jake	United States
dgzin	De Santana Da Silva, Douglas	Brazil
supamen	Le, Phat	United States

Head coach

Christine "potter" Chi

Assistant coach(es)

Mike "pho" Panza, Daniel "Faded" Hwang

Legend:
- (I) Inactive
- (S) Suspended
- Substitute
- (injured) Injury / Illness

Roster

Awards and achievements
Preceded by Newbee	The International winner 2015; With: Fear, Sumail, Universe, Aui_2000, ppd), and BuLba (coach)	Succeeded by Wings Gaming
