= Team Secret =

European esports team

- Games: Dota 2 Rainbow Six Siege; PUBG Mobile; League of Legends; League of Legends: Wild Rift; VALORANT; Rocket League; Mobile Legends: Bang Bang; Counter-Strike 2 The Finals
- Founded: August 2014; 11 years ago
- Location: Europe
- Head coach: Lee "Heen" Seung-gon
- Manager: Cyborgmatt; John Yao
- Partners: Corsair Gaming; MetaThreads; NVIDIA; Secretlab
- Website: teamsecret.gg

Team Secret is an esports team based in Europe, formed in 2014, and best known for their Dota 2 team.

In March 2016, Team Secret picked up an international female Counter-Strike: Global Offensive team. In April 2016, Team Secret expanded into the world of Street Fighter with Lee "Poongko" Chung-Gon as their first World Warrior, and also signed Otto "Silent Wolf" Bisno as a Super Smash Bros. Melee player. In July 2018 Team Secret entered into competitive Age of Empires 2 after acquiring key members from Team TyRanT. In August 2018, Team Secret expanded into Rainbow Six Siege Pro League by signing Team IDK.

== Dota 2 ==
=== History ===
==== 2014 ====
Na`Vi posted on their website they released Puppey and KuroKy. On August 27, 2014, Team Secret debuted and showed their roster in a match against Alliance.

==== 2015 ====
After a solid second place in Star-Ladder Series 10, the team announced on their Twitter and the DAC site of the departure of Fly and BigDaddy, with zai and Arteezy taking their place as stand-ins.

Team Secret got third place in the Dota 2 Asia Championships and decided to stick with their roster, going on to win 5 premier tournaments.

Team Secret was widely considered to be the favorites to win The International 2015, but after a very disappointing 7-8th-place finish, the team announced that they would have some roster changes. Despite the overall success of the team for the year, members Arteezy and KuroKy were revealed to have clashed with one another and both players left the team. Arteezy went back to his previous team Evil Geniuses and KuroKy formed what would soon be the newest iteration of Team Liquid. On August 15, the team announced that Zai would take the next year off and finish school. As a result, s4 also decided to leave and rejoin his previous team Alliance.

For the Frankfurt Major, the team's new roster was announced and consisted of EternalEnVy, w33, Misery, Puppey, and pieliedie.

==== 2016 ====
During the Shanghai Major, Team Secret went through the upper bracket beating previous Frankfurt Major winners: OG in a best of three of 2–1 in the first upper bracket round; they faced Evil Geniuses in the second upper bracket round and won 2–1. Team Secret then faced Team Liquid in the upper bracket finals in a best of 3, winning 2–0 and heading into the Major's Grand Final.

On March 6, Team Secret played against the recent lower bracket winners Team Liquid in the Grand Finals in a best of five match for US$1.1 million. Team Secret won the match with a 3–1 score.

On March 22, Team Secret announced that Artour "Arteezy" Babaev and Saahil "Universe" Arora would be replacing w33 and MiSeRy.

On June 6, after placing last at the Manila Major, Team Secret announced that Kanishka "BuLba" Sosale would be replacing Saahil "UNiVeRsE" Arora.

On August 27, the team announced a completely new roster, featuring Asian players Pyo "MP" No-a, Yeik "MidOne" Nai Zheng and Lee "Forev" Sang-don in addition to the already established European support duo Johan "pieliedie" Åström and Clement "Puppey" Ivanov.

On November 6, Forev's departure was announced. His replacement for the season would be German offlaner Maurice "KheZu" Gutmann.

==== 2017 ====
After achieving no major tournament victories by May 2017, notably knocked out in the first round of the Kiev Major by tournament underdogs SG-esports, Team Secret replaced pieliedie with Yazied "YapzOr" Jaradat, moving Puppey to the 5 position. While their results were somewhat improved, it did not make up for a lackluster season, leading to Team Secret not being directly invited to The International 2017. After making it through the European qualifiers, Team Secret was knocked out of The International 2017 by eventual champion Team Liquid in a tense 2–1 series, finishing in 9th-12th place. During the following roster shuffle, KheZu and MP were replaced by Marcus "Ace" Hoelgaard and Adrian "FATA-" Trinks in September 2017. With the new roster and new season of Dota Pro Circuit 2017-2018, they went on to win DreamLeague Season 8.

==== 2018 ====
Despite the team achieved several minor tournament victories, they did not win any major tournament in 2018, placing 5th-6th in The International 2018. With the new season of Dota Pro Circuit 2018-2019, the team underwent another roster shuffle, with Ace and Fata leaving the team, replacing them would be Michał "Nisha" Jankowski and Ludwig "zai" Wåhlberg.

==== 2019–present ====
At the KL Major, Team Secret were hailed as one of the favorites. After topping their group easily, the team went on to tear through the Upper Bracket, only dropping one game to Virtus.pro in the Upper Bracket Finals. Unfortunately for Secret, VP took their revenge in the Grand Finals in a nail-biting five-game series, where Secret were able to take a 2–1 lead but were unable to secure a final victory to take home the Major Championship.

With the shuffle, the team achieved a couple major tournament wins, notably The Chongqing Major and the MDL Disneyland Paris Major. Team Secret had 14,400 points in the ranking of the professional season Dota 2 from Valve and occupy the very first place in it with Puppey being voted as the MDL MVP. They played 8 games on the last day MDL Disneyland Paris Major winning through the upper bracket and coming to win the finals in style. Zai was a major factor in making space with his Mars for Nisha and MidOne. Nisha had the most last hits at 35 min in the tournament. Team Secret would go on to win the finals in a very convincing manner with a results of 3–1 over Team Liquid.

In November 2024, Team Secret competed in the group stage of the 1win Series Dota 2 Fall.

=== Roster ===
Team Secret Dota 2 roster
Players
Coaches

| Role | Handle | Name | Nationality |
|---|---|---|---|
| Carry | Crystallis | Arets, Remco | Netherlands |
| Midlane | MidOne | Yeik, Nai Zhang | Malaysia |
| Offlane | BOOM | Bičan, Miroslav | Czech Republic |
| Support | yamich | Lazebnyy, Daniyal | Russia |
| Support | Puppey | Ivanov, Clement | Estonia |
| Support | YapzOr (injured) | Jaradat, Yazied | Jordan |

Head coach

- Tue "ah fu" Soon Chuan

Legend:
- (I) Inactive
- (S) Suspended
- Substitute
- (injured) Injury / Illness

Latest roster transaction: 10 June 2023.

== Rainbow Six Siege ==
=== History ===
Shortly before the Six Major Paris 2018, Team Secret signed Team IDK. The original roster consisted of Bryan "Elemzje" Tebessi, Ryan "Lacky" Stapley, Leon "LeonGids" Giddens, Matthew "meepeY" Sharples, David "sTiZze" de Castro and Louis "Helbee" Bureau as coach. At the Paris Major, Team Secret placed 3-4th after besting OrgLess, FaZe Clan, Team Vitality, and losing to G2 Esports, the eventual champions and received $25,000.

On February 17, 2020, Joonas "jNSzki" Savolainen came out of retirement after leaving G2 and later the Mousesports/GiFu roster to replace Elemzje.

On May 5, the team disbanded

On May 13, Team Secret signed Team OrgLess after they qualified for the European League, ahead of their debut.

=== Roster ===
Team Secret Rainbow Six Siege roster
Players
Coaches

| Handle | Name | Nationality |
|---|---|---|
| Jume | Steinmann, Marc | Germany |
| Adrian | Tryka, Adrian | Poland |
| Savage | Alves, Lucas | Portugal |
| Mowwwgli | Dahmani, Yanis | France |
| NoaUrz | Urwitz, Noah | Sweden |

Head coach

- Marlon "Twister" Mello

Assistant coach(es)

- Igor "Vivas" Vivas

Legend:
- (I) Inactive
- (S) Suspended
- (C) Team captain
- Substitute
- (injured) Injury / Illness

Latest roster transaction: 11 June 2025.

== League of Legends ==
=== History ===
Team Secret League of Legends division acquired a Vietnam Championship Series spot from Lowkey Esports and competed in the VCS from 2020 up until 2024, when the VCS became a tier-two league in preparation for the League of Legends Championship Pacific (LCP) to launch in 2025. Whilst Team Secret did not end up on the initial team list for the LCP, it was announced on 6 December 2024 that Team Whales, who was invited to the LCP, had been acquired by Team Secret; the team is now known as Secret Whales.

=== Roster ===
Team Secret League of Legends roster
Players
Coaches

| Handle | Name | Nationality |
|---|---|---|
| Pun | Nguyễn Đăng Khoa | Vietnam |
| Hiro02 | Trần Lê Trung Hậu | Vietnam |
| Hizto | Lê Văn Hoàng Hải | Vietnam |
| Dire | Trần Duy Đức | Vietnam |
| Eddie | Hoàng Công Nghĩa | Vietnam |
| Bie | Trần Đức Hiếu | Vietnam |

Head coach

Chen "WarHorse" Ju-Chih

Assistant coach(es)

Trần "Ciel" Tiến Thịnh

Legend:
- (I) Inactive
- (S) Suspended
- Substitute
- (injured) Injury / Illness

Roster updated 02 March 2026.

== PUBG Mobile ==
=== Roster ===
Team Secret PUBG Mobile roster
Players
Coaches

| Handle | Name | Nationality |
|---|---|---|
| BreaK | Ngo Ngoc Hai | Vietnam |
| JikeyMFM | Le Quoc Khanh | Vietnam |
| MaxLV | Nguyễn Văn Thuận | Vietnam |
| SoazUwU | Nguyen Viet Quan | Vietnam |
| TrangXIX | Tran Tuan Duong | Vietnam |

Head coach

- Vacant

Legend:
- (I) Inactive
- (S) Suspended
- Substitute
- (injured) Injury / Illness

== League of Legends: Wild Rift ==
=== Roster ===
Team Secret League of Legends: Wild Rift roster
Players
Coaches

| Handle | Name | Nationality |
|---|---|---|
| Hamez | Santos, James | Philippines |
| Azar | Salle, Eleazar | Philippines |
| Code | Raymundo, Morris | Philippines |
| Chewy | Dela Cruz, Caster | Philippines |
| Tatsurii | Garcia, Heri | Philippines |
| Trebor | Mansilungan, Robert | Philippines |

Head coach

- Vacant

Legend:
- (I) Inactive
- (S) Suspended
- Substitute
- (injured) Injury / Illness

Roster updated 22 January 2021.

== Valorant ==
=== History ===
Team Secret entered the Valorant competitive scene in 2021 after acquiring the roster of Bren Esports in early September, who were supposed to represent Southeast Asia in the 2021 Valorant Champions Tour: Stage 3 Masters in Berlin as the regional champions, but failed to participate due to national restrictions brought by the COVID-19 pandemic and visa issues. In the same year, they have qualified for the 2021 Valorant Champions, the world championship tournament of Valorant for the inaugural 2021 competitive season, and finished in the Top 8 of the tournament, falling to eventual champions Team Acend in the quarterfinals. In 2023, the team has been selected by Riot Games as one of the partner franchise teams for the International Leagues of the VCT Pacific.

=== Roster ===
Team Secret Valorant roster
Players
Coaches

| Handle | Name | Nationality |
|---|---|---|
| natz | Adiputra, Jonathan | Indonesia |
| STYRON | Goh, Tidus | Singapore |
| KellyS | Kent Sedillo, Kelly | Philippines |
| Zeus | Vega, Jhian | Philippines |
| Sylvan | Go, Young-sup | South Korea |

Head coach

Peter "Spin" Bradford

Legend:
- (I) Inactive
- (S) Suspended
- Substitute
- (injured) Injury / Illness

Roster updated 29 July 2026.

== Rocket League ==
=== History ===
On February 25 Team Secret acquired the roster of Erased; Roberto Lima "Sad" de Souza, Matheus "math" Gonçalves, Olímpio "nxghtt" Torres. September 19 math was removed from the starting lineup. October 8 Danilo "kv1" Michelini joined.

=== Roster ===
Team Secret Rocket League roster
Players
Coaches

| Handle | Name | Nationality |
|---|---|---|
| DRUFINHO | Miguel, Arthur | Brazil |
| Motta | Brito Motta, João | Brazil |
| kv1 | Michelini, Danilo | Brazil |
| math (I) | Gonçalves, Matheus | Brazil |

Head coach

Mateus Santos "STL" Tornilio Lemos

Legend:
- (I) Inactive
- (S) Suspended
- Substitute
- (injured) Injury / Illness

Roster updated 9 November 2025.

== Counter-Strike 2 ==
=== History ===
On January 8, 2024, Team Secret announced the formation of a new Counter-Strike 2 roster including Danish players Mikkel "Maze" Sparvath and Sebastian "Tauson" Tauson Lindelof, Serbian player Vladan "Kind0" Mandic, Israeli player Guy "anarkez" Trachtman and Polish player Paweł "innocent" Mocek.

=== Roster ===
Team Secret Counter-Strike 2 roster
Players
Coaches

| Handle | Name | Nationality |
|---|---|---|
| innocent | Mocek, Paweł | Poland |
| anarkez | Trachtman, Guy | Israel |
| Maze | Sparvath, Mikkel | Denmark |
| Kind0 | Mandic, Vladan | Serbia |
| Tauson | Tauson Lindelof, Sebastian | Denmark |

Head coach

Benjamin "cube" Stabell

Legend:
- (I) Inactive
- (S) Suspended
- Substitute
- (injured) Injury / Illness

Latest roster transaction: 8 January 2024.
