= LGD Gaming =

Chinese esports organization

- Nickname: 老干爹 ("Old Godfather") 乐观家族 ("Optimistic Family")
- Short name: LGD
- Divisions: Dota 2 Honor of Kings; League of Legends; Overwatch; PlayerUnknown's Battlegrounds
- Founded: 2009
- Based in: Hangzhou, Zhejiang
- Location: China
- CEO: Pan Fei
- Vice President: Hu "Bigbiao" Biao

LGD Gaming is a Chinese professional esports organization based in Hangzhou. It is one of the oldest esports organizations in China and currently has players competing in Dota 2, Honor of Kings, League of Legends, Overwatch, and PlayerUnknown's Battlegrounds.

LGD's Dota 2 team was notably in a partnership with PSG Esports, and is known for making it to the grand finals of The International 2018 and The International 2021. The partnership expired in September 2023. Its League of Legends team competes in the League of Legends Pro League (LPL), the top level of professional League of Legends in China.

LGD are also members of the Esports World Cup Foundation Club Support Program, funded by Saudi Arabia's Public Investment Fund, which gives teams monetary rewards for painting the Esports World Cup tournament series in a positive light and driving engagement to the tournament, which is seen to some as a sportswashing tool that Saudi Arabia is using to distract the public from their poor human rights record.

== Dota 2 ==
=== 2018–2019 ===
LGD Gaming's original Dota 2 division was founded along with the organization in 2009. In April 2018, French football club Paris Saint-Germain F.C. partnered with LGD, sponsoring and rebranding the Dota 2 team to PSG.LGD. After winning two Dota Pro Circuit majors in 2017 and 2018, the team secured a directive invite to The International 2018, where they advanced to the grand finals but lost to OG 2–3.

Following that, the roster remained together for the next season, where they received a direct invite to The International 2019 after securing a top 12 finish in that year's Dota Pro Circuit rankings. The team was placed in Group A, finishing with a 13–3 record which guaranteed a place in the upper bracket. There, the team defeated Virtus.pro and Vici Gaming before losing once again to OG in the upper bracket grand final. The team was placed in the lower bracket final against Team Liquid, losing the series 2–1 to earn them 3rd place and therefore a total of $3,089,706.

=== 2020–2022 ===
The team continued with their strong form during The International 2021, going 15–1 in the group stage to advance to the upper bracket. There, the team won every series to advance to the grand finals by defeating T1, Virtus.pro and Team Secret but ultimately falling to Team Spirit in the best-of-five series 3–2, after nearly staging a reverse-sweep.

With the organization electing to not make any roster changes, the team continued their strong form into the 2022 season after facing off against Team Spirit in a series of rematches. The first of two rematches led to a second-place finish at the PGL Arlington Major after losing the final 3–1, while the team won the inaugural Riyadh Masters with a 2–0 score.

The team secured an invite to The International 2022, where, despite being touted as favorites to win the event, the team placed 5th–6th at the event after losing to Team Aster.

=== 2023 ===
Before the start of The International 2023, the partnership between the two teams expired in September 2023. With this change, the roster will revert back to playing under the LGD Gaming banner.

=== 2024 ===
LGD Gaming failed to qualify for The International 2024, ending an 11-year streak of appearances. In the TI 2024 China Qualifier, they were defeated by Azure Ray and then by Team Turtle. This marks LGD Gaming's first absence from The International since their debut in 2012.

=== Roster ===
LGD Gaming Dota 2 roster
Players
Coaches

Role	Handle	Name	Nationality
Carry	shiro	Guo Xuanang	China
Midlane	Emo	Zhou Yi	China
Offlane	niu	Li Kongbo	China
Support	Pyw	Xiong Jiahan	China
Support	y`	Zhang Yiping	China
Support	planet (I)	Lin Hao	China
Offlane	Xiangyu (I)	Li Longwu	China

Head coach

- Zhang "xiao8" Ning

Legend:
- (I) Inactive
- (S) Suspended
- Substitute
- (injured) Injury / Illness

Latest roster transaction: 11 December 2023.

=== Achievements ===
Date	Place	Tier	Tournament	Prize
2022-07-24	1st	Tier 1	Riyadh Masters 2022	$1,500,000
2021-10-17	2nd	Tier 1	The International 2021	$5,202,400
2021-06-13	1st	Tier 1	WePlay AniMajor	$200,000
2019-08-25	3rd	Tier 1	The International 2019	$3,089,706
2018-08-25	2nd	Tier 1	The International 2018	$4,085,148
2018-05-20	1st	Tier 1	MDL Changsha Major	$400,000
2018-05-06	1st	Tier 1	EPICENTER XL	$500,000
2017-08-11	4th	Tier 1	The International 2017	$1,728,154
2015-08-08	3rd	Tier 1	The International 2015	$2,211,554
2015-05-23	1st	Tier 1	i-League Season 3	$214,184

== League of Legends ==
LGD Gaming
- Game: League of Legends
- Founded: 20 February 2012
- League: LPL
- Stadium: LGD Allied Esports Stadium
- Championships: 1× LPL (Summer 2015)

=== History ===
LGD Gaming created their League of Legends division on 20 February 2012, with Zhou "Bug" Qilin leading the team. After the TGA Grand Prix 2012, LGD qualified for the Season 2 China Regional Finals, but fell short after losing to Invictus Gaming. In 2013 Tencent created China's first championship series, the League of Legends Pro League (LPL). LGD failed to join the league through the qualifiers in both the spring and summer seasons of 2013, but was successful the next year, qualifying for the 2014 LPL Spring Split. The team placed fifth in the regular season of the 2014 LPL Spring Split, failing to qualify for playoffs. In the regular season of the 2014 LPL Summer Split however, LGD placed fourth and qualified for playoffs, where they lost to EDward Gaming 0–3 in the first round and Star Horn Royal Club 1–3 in the loser's bracket, remaining in 4th. LGD was unable to qualify for the 2014 World Championship after losing the final qualifying round in the 2014 China Regional Finals to OMG.

After failing to qualify for the 2014 World Championship, LGD decided to sign Korean players in hopes of qualifying the next year. Bot laner Gu "imp" Seung-bin and top laners Choi "Acorn" Cheon-ju and Lee "Flame" Ho-jong were acquired from Samsung White, Samsung Blue, and CJ Entus Blaze respectively. LGD placed sixth in the regular season of the 2015 LPL Spring Split with a 7–5–10 record, qualifying for playoffs. In playoffs the team surprised expectations by beating both OMG and Snake Esports, who were 3rd and 2nd respectively in the regular season, in two 3–0 sweeps. This qualified LGD for the finals, where they lost 2–3 to EDward Gaming in a close series.

=== Roster ===
Hangzhou LGD Gaming League of Legends roster
Players
Coaches

Role	Handle	Name	Nationality
Top	Burdol	Noh Tae-yoon	South Korea
Jungle	Meteor	Zeng Guo-Hao	China
Mid	haichao	Zhang Hai-Chao	China
Mid	Kepler	Zou Jia-Le	China
Bot	Shaoye	Qiu Guo-bin	China
Support	Jinjiao	Xie Jinshan	China

Head coach

Chen "1874" Li-Xin

Assistant coach(es)

Xian "Chelizi" Han-Xi

Legend:
- (I) Inactive
- (S) Suspended
- Substitute
- (injured) Injury / Illness

Roster updated 9 January 2024.
