= The International 2015 =

2015 esports tournament

Tournament information
- Game: Dota 2
- Location: Seattle, Washington, U.S.
- Dates: August 3–6, 2015
- Administrator: Valve
- Tournament format(s): Group stage Round robin Main event Double elimination
- Venue: KeyArena
- Participants: 16 teams
- Purse: US$18,429,613

Final positions
- Champions: Evil Geniuses
- 1st runner-up: CDEC Gaming
- 2nd runner-up: LGD Gaming

The International 2015 (TI5) was the fifth edition of The International, an annual Dota 2 esports championship tournament, which took place at the KeyArena in Seattle. Hosted by Valve, the game's developer, the tournament began in May with the qualifier phase and ended after the main event in August.

The tournament awarded one of the biggest prize pools in esports tournament history, at over US$18 million, with the winning team, Evil Geniuses, being awarded over $6 million.

== Background ==
Valve announced The International 2015 in January 2015, again taking place at the KeyArena in Seattle. Tickets went on sale in March, selling out in around 5 minutes.

An interactive compendium was again announced, being released in May 2015, with purchases of the compendium going towards the tournament's prize pool. By June, the prize pool had passed the previous year's total of $11 million, overtaking it as the largest esports prize pool in history at the time, and with 60 days of funding remaining. Valve anticipated that the total would exceed $15 million by the time of the tournament, a target which was reached in July. Purchasers who reach a high enough level with their compendium were sent a miniature replica International trophy.

The tournament's games began on July 26, with the wild card matches, followed by four days of a round robin format group stage being played as best of two matches. The main brackets then began on August 3.

During the second day of the tournament, a DDOS attack was reported to have occurred, affecting around three hours of games.

== Teams ==
Ten professional teams were directly invited to the event, with four regional winners and two 'wild card' winners also invited. The 'wild card' winners were decided during the main competition in Seattle from CDEC Gaming, Team Archon, MVP Phoenix and Vega Squadron.

Direct invitation

- (China) ViCi Gaming
- (United States) Evil Geniuses
- (Europe) Team Secret
- (China) Invictus Gaming
- (China) LGD Gaming
- (Europe) Cloud9
- (Russia) Team Empire
- (Russia) Virtus.pro
- (China) NewBee
- (Malaysia) Fnatic

Regional qualifier winners

- (United States) compLexity Gaming (Americas)
- (South Korea) MVP.Hot6ix (Southeast Asia)
- EHOME (China)
- (Ukraine) Natus Vincere (Europe)

Wild card winners

- CDEC Gaming (China)
- (South Korea) MVP Phoenix (Korea)

== Bracket ==
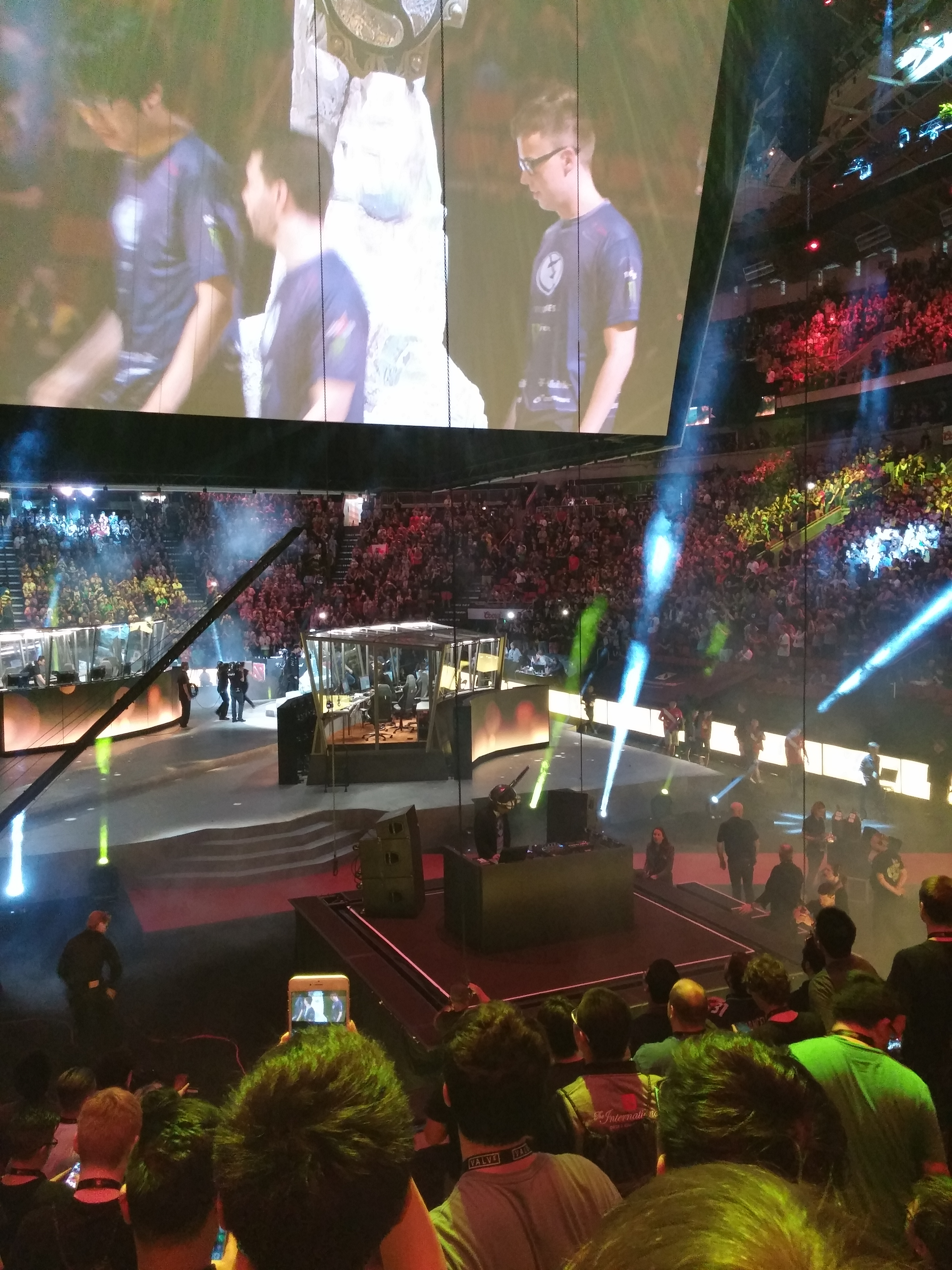
The International 2015 at the KeyArena in Seattle.

The tournament's first day of games began on July 26 with four teams competing for the two wild card spots. The winners of the upper and lower brackets, CDEC and MVP Phoenix, gained these positions in the main tournament.

=== Wild card ===
Round one
CDEC	2
Vega Squadron	1
Winner's bracket
MVP Phoenix	2
Archon	1
Loser's bracket
Vega Squadron	2
Archon	0

Round two
CDEC	2
MVP Phoenix	0
MVP Phoenix	2
Vega Squadron	1

=== Group stage ===
==== Group A ====
Pos	Team	Pld	W	D	L	Pts	
1	LGD Gaming	7	5	2	0	17	Seeded in Winner's quarterfinals with choosing rights
2	Team Secret	7	4	3	0	15	Seeded in Winner's quarterfinals without choosing rights
3	Complexity Gaming	7	4	1	2	13	Unseeded in Winner's quarterfinals
4	Cloud 9	7	3	1	3	10	Unseeded in Winner's quarterfinals
5	MVP Phoenix	7	1	3	3	6	Seeded in Loser's Round of 16 with choosing rights
6	Invictus Gaming	7	1	3	3	6	Seeded in Loser's Round of 16 without choosing rights
7	Fnatic	7	0	4	3	4	Unseeded in Loser's Round of 16
8	Natus Vincere	7	0	3	4	3	Unseeded in Loser's Round of 16

Source: The International 2015

==== Group B ====
Pos	Team	Pld	W	D	L	Pts	
1	Evil Geniuses	7	3	4	0	13	Seeded in Winner's quarterfinals with choosing rights
2	CDEC Gaming	7	4	1	2	13	Seeded in Winner's quarterfinals without choosing rights
3	EHOME	7	2	5	0	11	Unseeded in Winner's quarterfinals
4	Team Empire	7	2	3	2	9	Unseeded in Winner's quarterfinals
5	Virtus.pro	7	2	3	2	9	Seeded in Loser's Round of 16 with choosing rights
6	Vici Gaming	7	1	4	2	7	Seeded in Loser's Round of 16 without choosing rights
7	Newbee	7	0	6	1	6	Unseeded in Loser's Round of 16
8	MVP HOT6ix	7	0	2	5	2	Unseeded in Loser's Round of 16

Source: The International 2015

== Main event ==
Upper round 1	Upper round 2	Upper final	Grand Finals
A1	LGD Gaming	2
B4	Team Empire	1
A1	LGD Gaming	0
B2	CDEC Gaming	2
B2	CDEC Gaming	2
C4	Cloud 9	0
B2	CDEC Gaming	2
B1	Evil Geniuses	0
B1	Evil Geniuses	2
C3	Complexity Gaming	0
B1	Evil Geniuses	2
B3	EHOME	1
A2	Team Secret	0
B3	EHOME	2
B2	CDEC Gaming	1
B1	Evil Geniuses	3
Lower round 1	Lower round 2	Lower round 3	Lower round 4	Lower round 5	Lower final
B4	Team Empire	0
B3	EHOME	0
A5	MVP Phoenix	1	A5	MVP Phoenix	2
A5	MVP Phoenix	0	B6	Vici Gaming	2
B7	Newbee	0
B6	Vici Gaming	2	B1	Evil Geniuses	2
A4	Cloud 9	0
B6	Vici Gaming	1	A1	LGD Gaming	0
B6	Vici Gaming	1	B6	Vici Gaming	2
A1	LGD Gaming	2
A8	Natus Vincere	0
A3	Complexity Gaming	1
A1	LGD Gaming	2
B5	Virtus.pro	1	B5	Virtus.pro	2
B5	Virtus.pro	2	B5	Virtus.pro	0
A7	Fnatic	0
A2	Team Secret	1
A2	Team Secret	2
A6	Invictus Gaming	1	B6	Invictus Gaming	1
B8	MVP Hot6ix	0

== Results ==
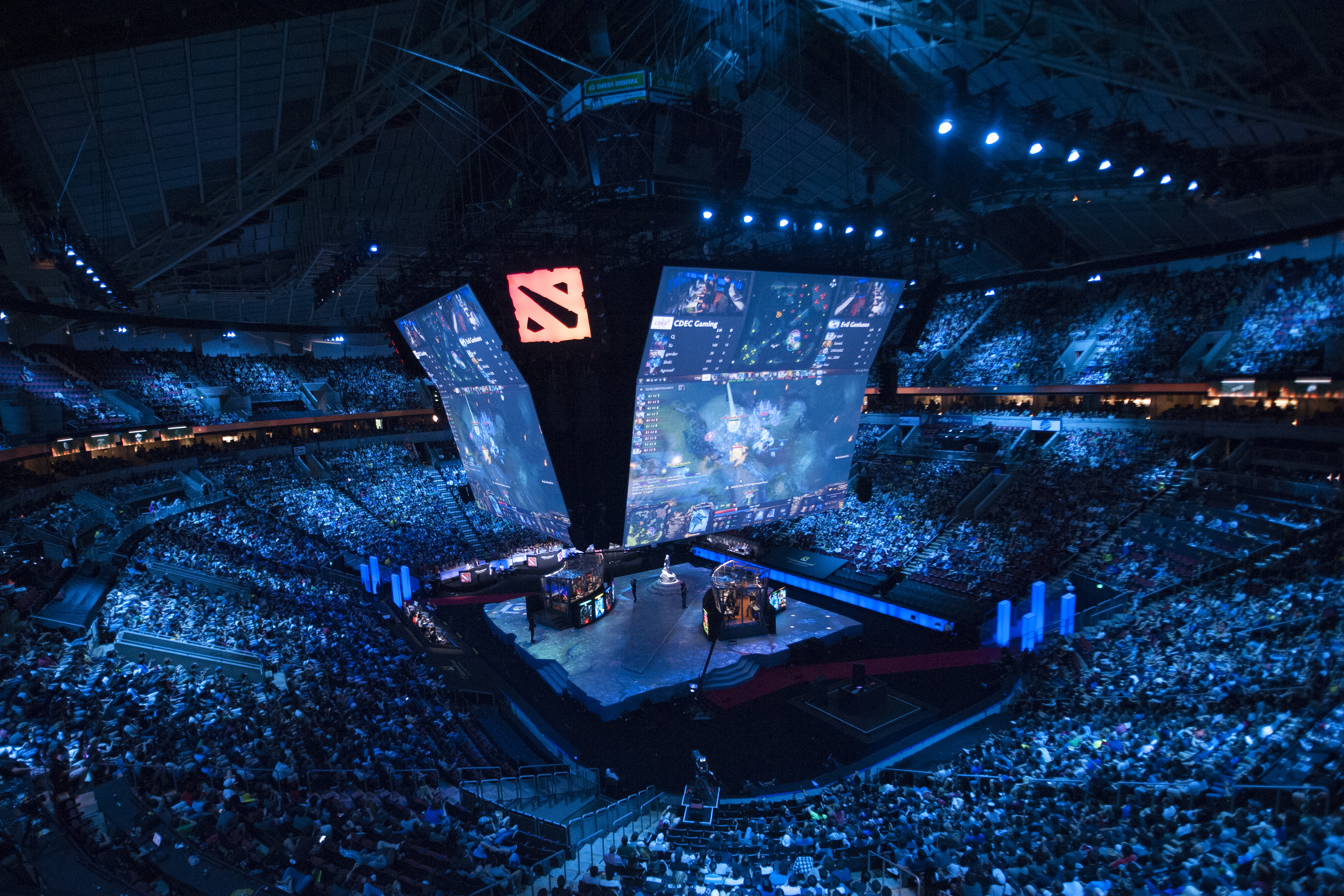
The International 2015 grand final in the KeyArena in Seattle.

(Note: Prizes are in USD)

Place	Team	Prize Money
1	Evil Geniuses	$6,634,661
2	CDEC Gaming	$2,856,590
3	LGD Gaming	$2,211,554
4	Vici Gaming	$1,566,517
5	EHOME.cn	$1,197,925
5	Virtus.pro	$1,197,925
7	MVP Phoenix	$829,333
7	Team Secret	$829,333
9–12	Team Empire	$221,155
9–12	Cloud9	$221,155
9–12	compLexity Gaming	$221,155
9–12	Invictus Gaming	$221,155
13–16	Fnatic	$55,289
13–16	Natus Vincere	$55,289
13–16	Newbee	$55,289
13–16	MVP HOT6ix	$55,289
