= KuroKy =

German electronic sports player

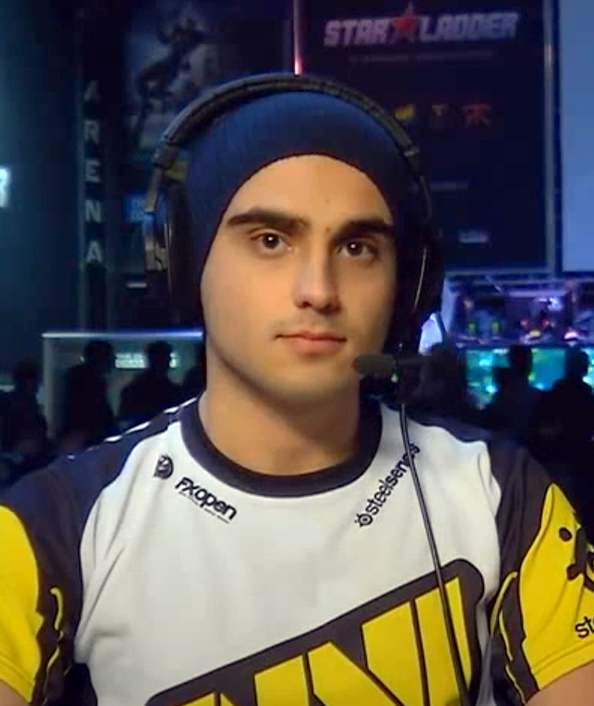
- Takhasomi in 2014

Personal information
- Name: Kuro Salehi Takhasomi
- Born: 28 October 1992 (age 34)
- Nationality: German; Iranian

Current team
- Team: Team Nigma
- Role: Captain/Support
- Games: Defense of the Ancients; Dota 2

Team history
- 2013–2014: Natus Vincere
- 2014–2015: Team Secret
- 2015: 5Jungz
- 2015–2019: Team Liquid
- 2019–present: Nigma Galaxy (Note: Known as Team Nigma from November 2019 to September 2021.)

Career highlights and awards
- The International champion (2017)

Kuro Salehi Takhasomi (Persian: کورو صالحی تخاصمی; born 28 October 1992), better known as KuroKy, is a German and Iranian professional Dota 2 player for Nigma Galaxy. He was a member of Team Liquid that won The International 2017.

== Career ==
=== 2008–2011: Dota ===
KuroKy began his professional career at age 16 in Defense of the Ancients, initially as a carry player for team mousesports, Kingsurf, Nirvana.int, MYM and Ks.int. It was in team mousesports where he met initial stand-in player Clement "Puppey" Ivanov, and started what was to become a long-standing relationship

=== 2011–2014: Early career, Natus Vincere ===
With the introduction of Dota 2 and its annual tournament The International, KuroKy's team struggled to find success and the signing of Puppey by Natus Vincere almost prompted KuroKy to quit professionally. Moving between teams Virtus.pro, Uebelst gamynG and mousesports, KuroKy's breakthrough came in 2013 when he joined Natus Vincere as a support player, finishing as runners-up in The International 2013.

=== 2014-2015: Team Secret ===
KuroKy left Natus Vincere after a lackluster 2014 campaign, and formed Team Secret with his Natus Vincere teammate Puppey, Fnatic players Fly and N0tail and from The Alliance, s4. A roster shuffle later saw them win 4 consecutive LAN finals, but disappointed in The International 2015 having gone in as the heavy favorites.

=== 2015–2019: Team Liquid ===
Following The International 2015, KuroKy left Team Secret to form a new team, 5Jungz composed of himself, FATA-, MATUMBAMAN, JerAx and MinD_ContRoL. 5Jungz was signed by the esports organisation Team Liquid and found immediate success, coming 2nd in The Shanghai Major 2016, The Manila Major 2016 and 1st at EPICENTER 2016. With further roster adjustments including the additions of then unknown pubstars Miracle- and GH, Team Liquid became the strongest team in the competition, winning several LANs in succession culminating in winning The International 2017.

Team Liquid's success in 2018 was comparatively lackluster. Liquid only managed to win one Valve Major competition all year, and only achieved 4th place at The International 2018. However, after the controversial replacement of MATUMBAMAN for Aliwi "w33" Omar even after taking a 2nd-place finish at the MDL Disneyland Paris Major, the team had found immediate success with another 2nd-place finish at the Epicenter Major after losing to Vici Gaming in a close series. Their success had continued to The International 2019, as they had made a miraculous run to the finals through the lower bracket of the Main Event after failing to obtain an upper bracket seed in the Group Stage. This involved beating Fnatic, TNC Predator, RNG, Evil Geniuses, Team Secret and PSG.LGD but ultimately falling to defending champions OG in the best-of-five series 3–1, therefore taking a grand total of $4,462,909.

=== 2019–present: Nigma ===
After four years with Team Liquid, KuroKy and the rest of the roster left to form their own organisation, Nigma.
