= Fly (gamer) =

Israeli Dota 2 player (born 1993)

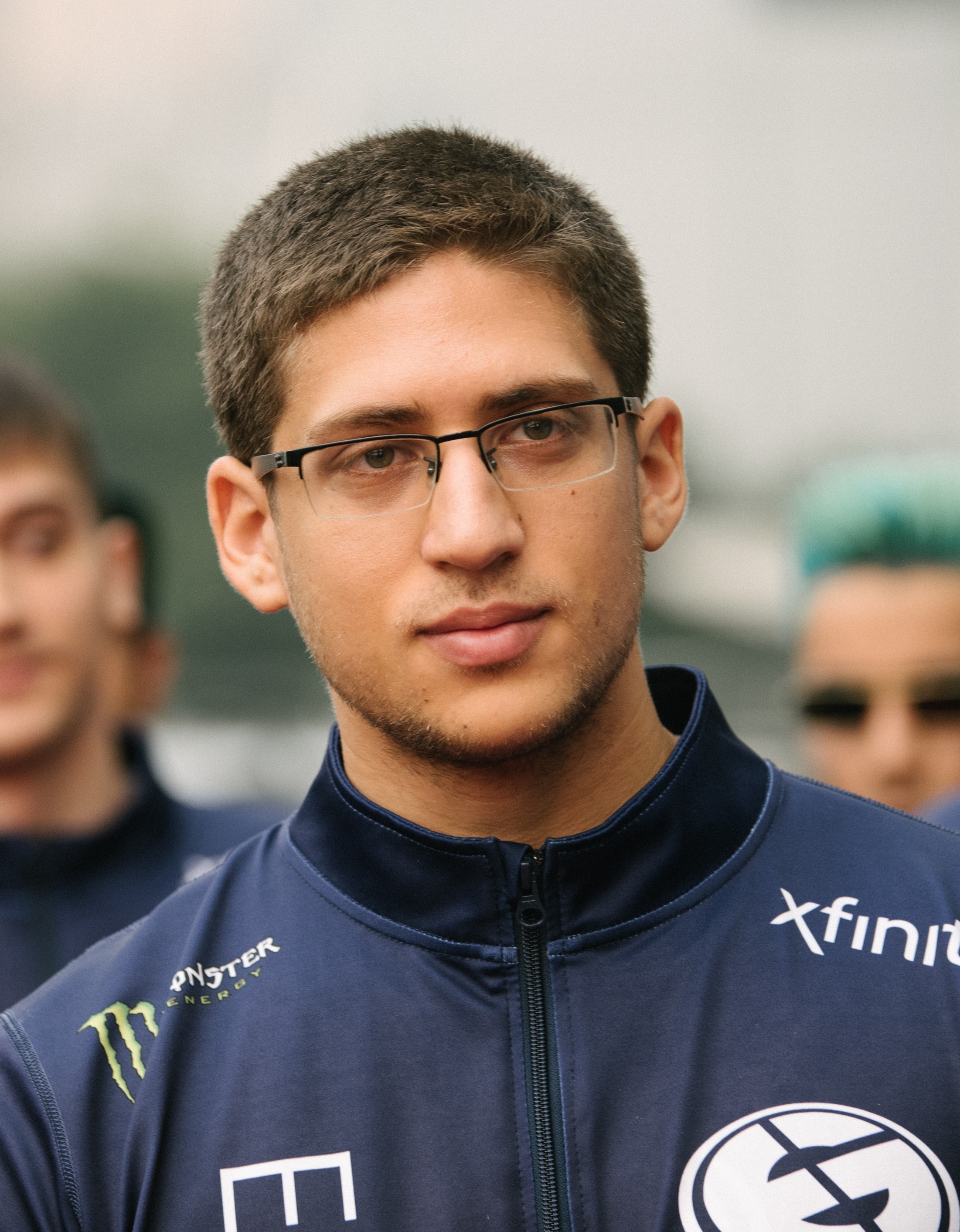
- Aizik in 2018

Personal information
- Name: Tal Aizik
- Born: 9 March 1993 (age 33)
- Nationality: Israeli/Canada

Current team
- Team: Nouns Esports
- Role: Support
- Game: Dota 2

Career information
- Games: Heroes of Newerth; Dota 2

Team history
- 2012–2014: Fnatic.EU
- 2014: Team Secret
- 2015: Complexity Gaming
- 2015–2018: OG
- 2018–2021: Evil Geniuses
- 2021–2022: Talon Esports
- 2022: Evil Geniuses
- 2022–2023: Shopify Rebellion
- 2023–2024: Nouns Esports
- 2024-2025: AVULUS
- 2025–: Virtus.pro

Career highlights and awards
- 4× Dota Major champion (Frankfurt, Manila, Boston, Kiev)

Tal Aizik (Hebrew: טל אייזיק; born 9 March 1993), better known as Fly, is an Israeli professional Dota 2 player for Nouns Esports. He is a former co-founder of the esports team OG. Aizik won four Dota Major Championships with team OG.

== Career ==
Coming from iLx along with N0tail and NoVa, Aizik took over the drafter role in Fnatic HoN squad. Being one of the longest serving members of Fnatic HoN squad, he switched with the team to Dota 2. Fly and n0tail left fnatic in August 2014. Tal played the offlane role for Team Secret, joining them along with BigDaddy. Tal and n0tail were separated at the end of 2014, when Aizik left Secret. They were re-united after The International 2015 in order to create a new team.

He founded OG on 31 October 2015. Soon after their renaming to OG, they won the Frankfurt Major tournament in November 2015, winning around US$1 million in prize money. Despite a 7th-place finish at the Shanghai Major in March 2016, OG won the Manila Major in June 2016, becoming the first team to repeat as champions of a Valve-sponsored Dota 2 tournament. OG also won the lesser ESL One Frankfurt 2016 tournament.

OG entered The International 2016 as one of the favorites, but finished 9-12th out of 16 teams. On 24 August 2016, founding members MoonMeander, Miracle- Al-Barkawi, and Cr1t- Nielsen left the team, but Fly remained. On 31 August 2016, s4, JerAx, and ana joined the team.

Although he won more 2 titles major, OG just finished 7-8th at The International 2017. The results made ana take a break after this. And then start of 2018, he and teams performed poorly on others tournaments.

In May 2018, he left OG to join Evil Geniuses, along with s4.

He and his team EG finished 3rd in The International 2018 but he was teased mercilessly when OG defeat him and his team and they won that.

In 2019, that scenario repeats itself as his team EG still defeat against opponents OG once again and only finished 5-6th when OG back-to-back win The International 2019

He finished 9-12th at The International 2021.

In 2021, he left EG and join Talon Esports but he left Talon and rejoins EG once again. At The International 2022, EG leads group stage but falling in brackets and finished 9-12th

== Personal life ==
He is the son of the Krav Maga instructor Moni Aizik. Tal has done instructor courses and has an active interest in Krav Maga himself. He says that if he were not a professional Dota 2 player, he would be a Krav Maga teacher.

Tal married long-time partner Evany Chang in 2023, who worked alongside Tal as manager, co-founder, and co-owner at varying points of his career.
