= Ana (gamer) =

Australian esports player (born 1999)

ana
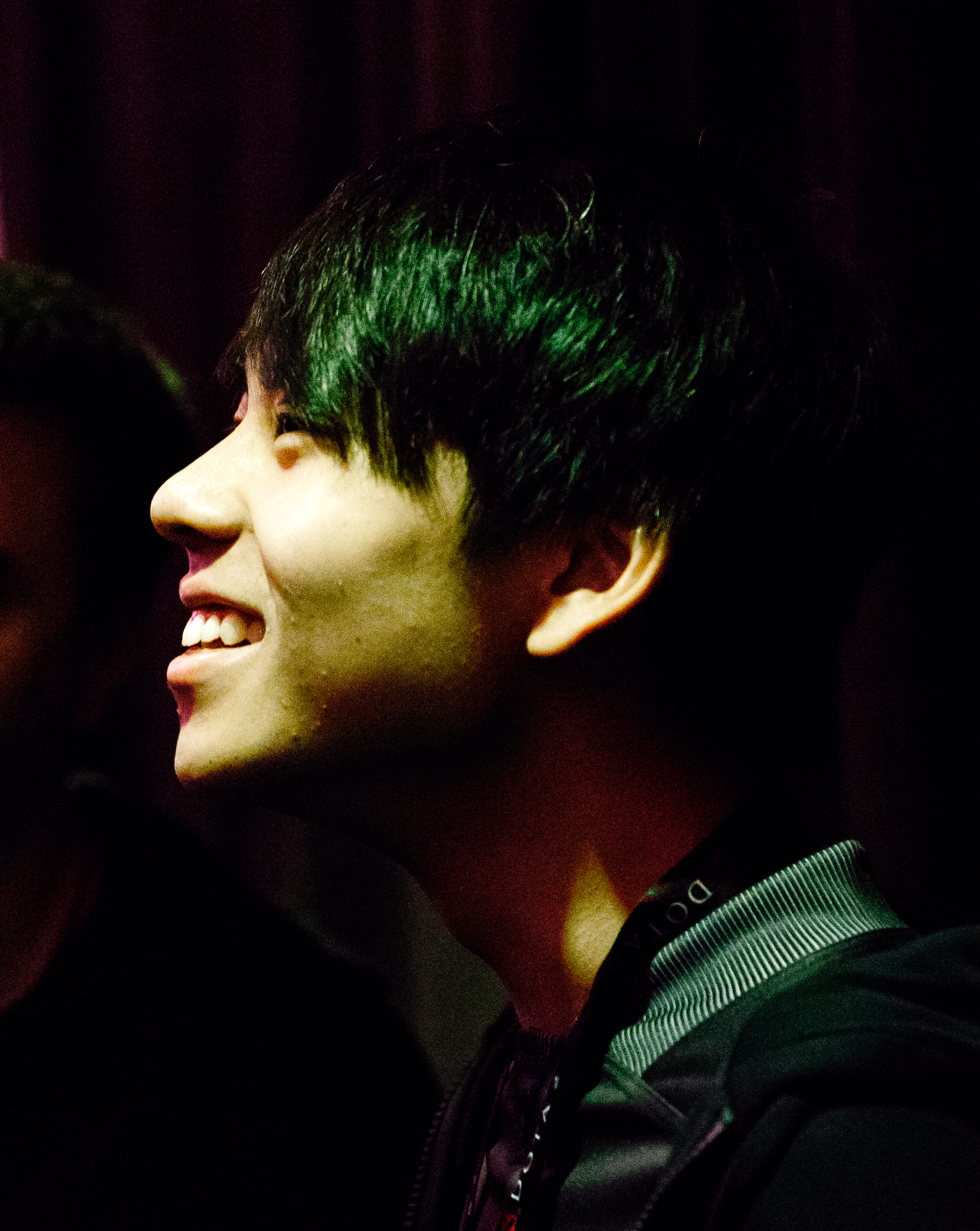
- Ana in 2018
- Born: Anathan Pham; 26 October 1999 (age 27); Melbourne, Australia
- Occupation: Professional gamer
- Years active: 2016–2021; 2022

Esports career information
- Game: Dota 2
- Role: Carry

Team history
- 2016: Invictus Gaming
- 2016–2021: OG
- 2022: T1

Career highlights and awards
- 2× The International champion (2018, 2019); 2× Dota Major champion (Boston, Kyiv)

Anathan Pham (born 26 October 1999), better known as ana, is an Australian professional Dota 2 player. As a member of OG, he has played in three iterations of The International, winning in 2018 and 2019, and has also won two Major championships tournaments.

== Career ==
=== Early career ===
Ana was born in Melbourne, Australia on 26 October 1999. An avid Dota 2 player, he often played 10 hours a day or more to the point where it started to impact his education. In 2016, Ana was offered a position in Invictus Gaming's in-house league; he dropped out of high school at age 16 and moved to Shanghai. He began as a substitute for Ferrari_430. His most notable accomplishment with the team was defeating Newbee in the grand finals of NEA 2016.

=== Move to OG ===
Following The International 2016, Ana left the team to join OG. In November, he won his first tournament with OG at Elimination Mode Season 2 and later won his first major event by defeating Ad Finem 3–1 in the grand finals of Boston Major.

The team's performance continued to stay consistent with additional top 4 performances at Dota Pit League Season 5, StarLadder i-League StarSeries Season 3, and Dota 2 Asia Championships 2017. Ana would then take his second major at Kiev Major, and the team was invited for The International 2017.

During The International 2017, OG underperformed expectations, finishing at 7-8th position, falling at the hands of LGD Gaming. Following their loss, Ana announced that he would be taking a break from the professional scene. In early 2018 he joined the short-lived Echo International.

=== International victories ===
==== 2018 ====
In 2018, months prior to The International 2018, OG's co-founder Fly left alongside s4, leaving OG struggling to fill their roster as all high level players had already signed for the upcoming competition. Ana thus re-joined OG alongside an unproven newbie Topson. With Topson being a solo middle specialist, Ana moved onto the hard carry role. Despite a bad start at The International 2018's group stage, OG finished fourth and were seeded into the upper bracket of the main event. Considered underdogs during their entire time at the event, OG and Ana advanced to the grand finals and won the tournament by defeating PSG.LGD in the best-of-five series 3–2. OG's win was characterized by some commentators as a Cinderella story

Following the victory, Ana decided to take a break from professional Dota 2.

==== 2019–2021 ====
He returned to the team in March 2019. Later that year, Ana won The International 2019, making him and the rest of the team the first repeat winners of The International. The commentators noted that Ana developed a completely novel carry Io strategy, which was previously considered to not be viable, which he utilised to great effect.

Ana announced another hiatus from the team following the victory. He returned to the active roster in April 2021.

=== Retirement ===
After two months with the team, Ana announced his retirement from competitive Dota in June 2021. However one year after his retirement, in 2022, he returned to the pro scene playing as a substitute player for Team Liquid and Royal Never Give Up in Riyadh Masters and PGL Arlington Major.

== Playstyle ==
External videos
- Analysis of a short play by Ana

In his early career, Ana played in the position solo mid, with comparatively little success. He received significant criticism for his solo mid performance and comparatively low creep score. Prior to the International 2018, Ana transitioned to playing as a carry, leaving the solo mid position to Topias "Topson" Taavitsainen.

Ana has been described as an integral piece to OG's success. He developed a novel carry Io strategy which kept his opponents off balance throughout The International 2019. He was noted for his so-called "game sense". Commentators have called him as one of the best carry players, and one of the best Dota 2 players overall.
