= Topson =

Professional Dota 2 player

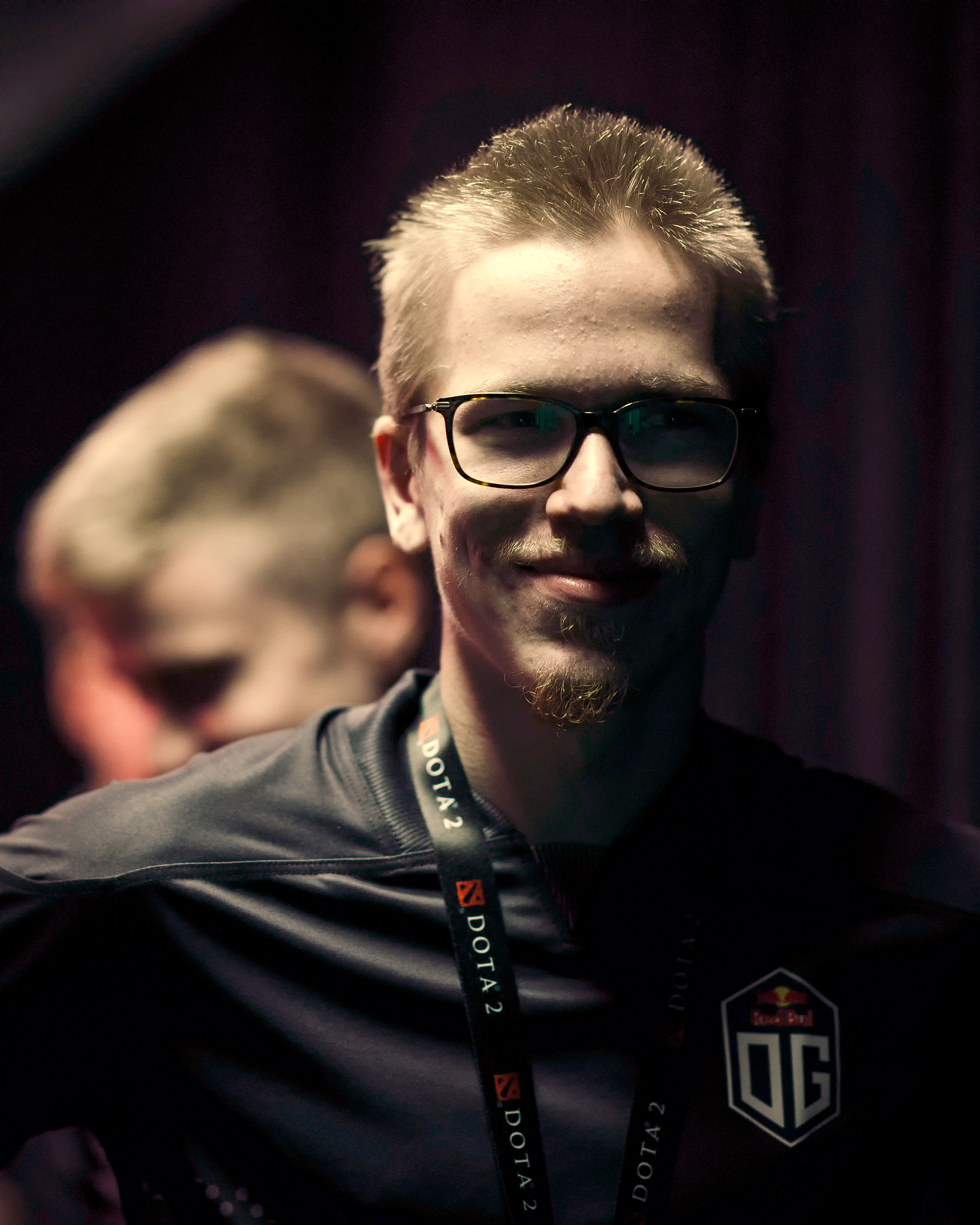
- Taavitsainen in 2018

Personal information
- Name: Topias Taavitsainen
- Born: 14 April 1998 (age 28); Haukipudas, Finland

Current team
- Team: LGD Gaming
- Role: Middle Lane
- Game: Dota 2

Team history
- 2017: SFT
- 2017–2018: 5 Anchors
- 2018–2022: OG
- 2022: T1 (stand-in)
- 2023–2024: Tundra Esports
- 2026: LGD Gaming (stand-in)

Career highlights and awards
- 2× The International champion (2018, 2019)

Topias Miikka Taavitsainen (born 14 April 1998), better known as Topson, is a Finnish professional Dota 2 player. As a member of OG, he won The International 2018 and The International 2019.

== Early life ==
Topias Miikka Taavitsainen was born in Haukipudas, Finland on 14 April 1998. He has seven brothers and four sisters. At the encouragement of his brothers, he began playing Defense of the Ancients when he was eight years old. His father owns a construction company and grew up as Laestadian family. His parents were doubtful if playing video games as a career would be profitable, but his eventual success of winning tournaments surprised his mother. He originally studied to be an electrician but transferred to a cooking school after one year.

== Career ==
Taavitsainen made appearances on lower-level squads in events before his big breakthrough. While none of these teams made an impact, his gameplay got noticed. His breakout for professional scene moment came in 2017. He had joined the Russian organisation SFT e-sports, where they had decided to pick up an entirely new roster. It was the first time that he had played for a high-tier team. After trying his luck with several teams, he focused on streaming and soon topped the European region by way of MMR. He was then recruited to join OG in 2018.

Prior to The International 2018, OG lost three members of its roster with co-founder and captain Fly and s4 leaving to join Evil Geniuses and Resolut1on being released from his contract. With majority of top level players already being committed to teams for the upcoming competition, OG offered a position to Taavitsainen who was at that point an unproven newbie who had never participated in a major LAN event. Due to such late roster change, OG was no longer eligible to be directly invited to The International 2018 and instead qualified through Open Qualifiers.

Following that, OG were then placed into group A of The International's group stage, finishing fourth with a record of 9–7, which seeded them into the upper bracket. There, OG won every series to advance to the grand finals. Facing the lower bracket winner PSG.LGD in it, whom OG had just defeated in the upper bracket finals, OG won the game one, but lost the next two games. Needing another win to avoid losing the series, OG forced a late-game comeback in game four, and subsequently won game five in a similar fashion, making them International champions and winning them over $11 million in prize money. Their victory was considered a Cinderella and underdog success story, as they had come from the open qualifiers and had beaten some of the more favored and accomplished teams along the way.

OG and Taavitsainen continued their reign as The International 2019 champions, defeating Team Liquid 3–1 to become the first team to win back-to-back Internationals. Taavitsainen remained in the roster until the conclusion of The International 2021, as OG were unable to defend their title after losing to eventual champions Team Spirit 2–0 in the lower bracket.

After a short hiatus from professional play, Taavitsainen joined T1 as a stand-in ahead of SEA qualifiers for The International 2022. Albeit, the team was unable to qualify for the main event, with Taavitsainen leaving the roster to join Ceb and N0tail in their team, "Old G".

After a brief reunion, Taavitsainen ended up joining defending champions Tundra Esports ahead of The International 2023. However, the roster was eliminated by Entity in the group stage of the event. Taavitsainen remained with the roster for the 2024 season, with Tundra Esports picking up a third place finish at The International 2024 after losing to Gaimin Gladiators in the lower bracket final. The event marked Taavitsainen's final appearance in professional play, as he announced his retirement from competitive Dota 2 due to family reasons and to enlist for mandatory military service in Finland.

In August 2026, it was announced that Taavitsainen would briefly return to professional play, after being signed by LGD Gaming as a stand-in for The International 2026.

== Playstyle ==
Prior to The International 2018, Taavitsainen was considered to be one of weaker middle laners due to his unorthodox hero pool, questionable in-game strategic choices, and tendency to lose the middle lane. In the latter stages of his career, Taavitsainen became renowned for his innovative playstyle, utilising his experience with unorthodox circumstances and his deep understanding of game mechanics to exploit weaknesses that other professionals had not yet considered. Taavitsainen's style has been described as being more selfless than most professional mid-laners, moving away from the rigid traditional expectations of the mid-lane role, and developing a flexibility of playstyle that allowed his team to draft and play in a more dynamic manner.

== Personal life ==
He is married to Malaysian-born Mawar Remy Taavitsainen. The couple first appeared together publicly during a Red Bull film screening in August 2019, shortly after his first International victory. They welcomed their daughter, Riina, on September 18, 2020. Following her birth, he took a hiatus from professional Dota 2 to focus on his family. Mawar has expressed strong support for his potential return to competitive gaming, often accompanying him to public events and screenings related to his career.

== Awards and nominations ==
Year	Award	Category	Result	Ref.
2026	The Streamer Awards	Best MOBA Streamer	Nominated	
