= Puppey =

Estonian esport player

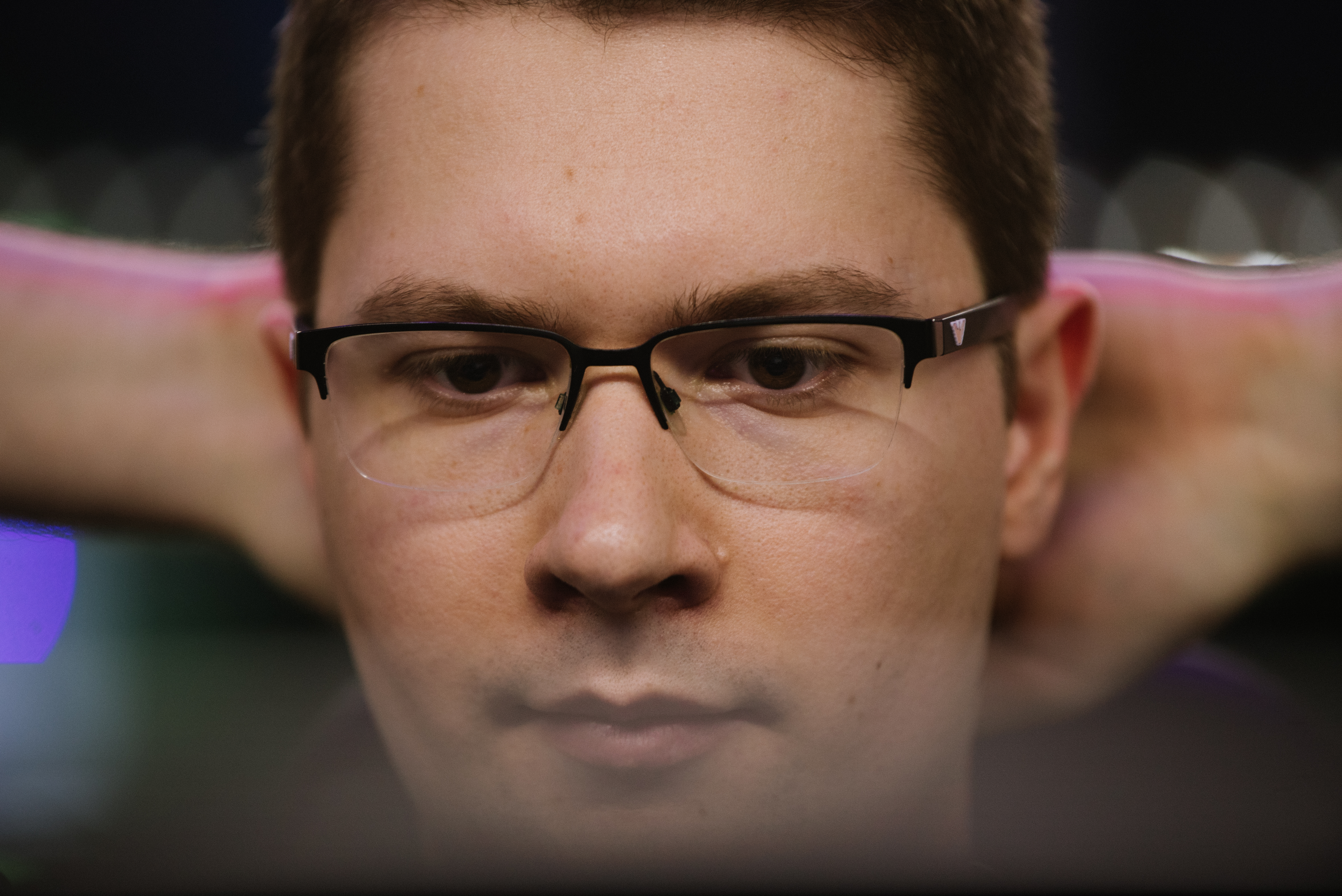
- Puppey in 2018

Personal information
- Name: Clement Ivanov
- Born: 6 March 1990 (age 36); Tartu, Estonia
- Nationality: Estonian

Current team
- Team: Team Secret
- Role: Support
- Game: Dota 2

Career information
- Games: Dota; Dota 2
- Playing career: 2007–2011 (Dota); 2011–present (Dota 2)

Team history
- 2007–2008: Xero Skill
- 2008–2009: KingSurf.International
- 2009: Nirvana.International
- 2009–2010: Team.GG
- 2010–2014: Natus Vincere
- 2014–present: Team Secret

Career highlights and awards
- The International champion (2011); Dota Major champion (Shanghai)

Clement Ivanov (born 6 March 1990), better known as Puppey, is an Estonian professional Dota 2 player for Team Secret. He is the founding member of Team Secret. Together with Natus Vincere, Puppey won The International 2011 in August 2011 for a one million dollar first place prize. They also took runner-up for the next two Internationals.

== DotA ==
Puppey began his esports career in 2007, joining team Xero Skill. Puppey had a successful DotA career playing for top teams, such as KingSurf.international, Nirvana.international, and Team Na'Vi. His final Dota LAN match was a win with Na'Vi at Asus Open Summer 2011.

== Dota 2 ==
=== With Natus Vincere ===
Puppey started his first steps into the DotA 2 competitive scene with Natus Vincere among players such as Dendi and Artstyle, as they competed in The International 2011. They went undefeated throughout the whole tournament, winning the then-big US$1,000,000 grand prize. They also won the Electronic Sports World Cup 2011 and took home US$12,000. In both of these tournaments, he demonstrated fantastic prediction with the hero Chen's ability to send his teammates back to base. Puppey became Natus Vincere's Captain after ArtStyle departed from the team in October 2011.

After winning those two tournaments, Puppey went on to have a place on the podium for 31 out of 32 different tournaments in from 2011 to 2013, winning tournaments such as the Alienware cup, StarLadder Star Series Season 7 and The Defense Season 4. He also achieved second place in The International 2012.

After winning the Dota 2 Champions League Season 2 in 2014, things began to go south for Puppey, getting a 7-8th place at The International 2014, Puppey suddenly left Natus Vincere with Kuroky. The community started saying rumors about why he would leave a team he stayed with for four years.

=== With Team Secret ===
After a loss in a series against Alliance, Puppey and his new team consisting of him, Fly, N0tail, KuroKy and s4, went on to achieve second place in their first tournament Starladder Season 10.

Following his first achievement with Team Secret, Puppey went on to be top 3 in 7 major tournaments and 1 premier tournament. He also won a 'Double Trouble' season with his manager, Matthew 'Cyborgmatt' Bailey. The Double Trouble tournament included a team of two major DotA 2 personalities who battled against other groups of two of the major Dota 2 personalities.

His first major achievement with Team Secret was when the team won US$120,000 in ESL One Frankfurt which included teams such as Alliance, Evil Geniuses, Cloud9, and Invictus Gaming.

Team Secret went into The International 2015 as heavy favorites, but left only with a tie for 7-8 place and US$830,000.

Following TI5, the team underwent heavy drama between Kuro 'KuroKy' S. Takhasomi and Artour 'Arteezy' Babaev, which started with Arteezy indirectly blaming the loss at The International on KuroKy while streaming on Twitch and KuroKy responding and flaming Arteezy in German forums.

In the post-TI5 shuffle, s4 and Arteezy returned to their previous teams, Zai decided to leave competitive DOTA to finish school, and KuroKy formed a new German team 5Jungz (which will later be sponsored by Team Liquid). On 22 August, team director Kemal Sadikoglu announced the new roster of Team Secret which now included MiSery, EternaLEnVy, w33, pieliedie and of course Puppey

Following the new roster change, Puppey and his team went on to achieve second place in The Frankfurt Major and ESL One New York while winning the Nanyang DotA 2 Championships and the MLG World Finals 2015.

Puppey and Team Secret won Shanghai Major 2016 in March 2016 after beating Team Liquid in the finals. Roster changes made by Team Secret after the Shanghai Major 2016 were followed with weaker performances for the team, including a shared last-place finish at the Manila Major 2016. Team Secret won the European qualifiers to The International 2016, but the team was once again among the first eliminations. The majority of the Team Secret roster left the team after the event.

Team Secret confirmed a new roster led by Puppey for the 2016-2017 season. The team failed to qualify for the Boston Major 2016 and was once again among the first eliminations from the Kiev Major 2017. Team Secret received a spot in The International 2017 by winning the European qualifiers. The team finished in ninth place. Another series of roster changes for the organization followed.

The 2017-2018 Dota 2 competitive season saw the introduction of the Dota Pro Circuit. Puppey competed in 15 events during the season and won two of them including the DreamLeague Season 8 major. Team Secret ranked fourth in the Dota Pro Circuit standings for the season, giving Puppey a direct invitation to The International 2018. The team finished in fifth place.

Valve overhauled the Dota Pro Circuit for the 2018-2019 season. Puppey and Team Secret qualified for all five majors during the season, winning two of them. Their performance during the season led to a first-place finish in the Dota Pro Circuit standings and an invitation to The International 2019. The team finished fourth.

Puppey and Team Secret sat out of the first major cycle of the 2019-2020 Dota Pro Circuit season but returned for the second. The team's season started with a first-place finish in DreamLeague Season 13. This established Puppey as the first player to win five official Dota 2 majors. The COVID-19 pandemic resulted in the remainder of the Dota Pro Circuit season being cancelled, which was followed by The International 2020 being canceled. Puppey and Team Secret remained in action in online events for the remainder of 2020, including winning eight tournaments in a row.

The Dota Pro Circuit returned in 2021 with a new, league-based format. Puppey continued to captain Team Secret, with the team qualifying for both majors. This included a fourth-place finish in the ONE Esports Singapore Major and a 16th-place finish in the WePlay AniMajor. These results combined with first and fourth-place finishes in the European DPC leagues saw Team Secret finish eighth in the season's standings, which yielded a direct invitation to The International 2021. Puppey became the sole player to attend every The International tournament after KuroKy and Team Nigma placed third in The International 2021's European qualifiers. Team Secret finished the event in third place.

The 2022 Dota Pro Circuit season saw Puppey and Team Secret fail to qualify for any of the year's three majors, placing fifth in each European regional league tour. The team qualified for The International 2022 after taking second place in the European regional qualifiers and winning the Last Chance Qualifier tournament. Team Secret advanced to the grand finals. This was Puppey's fourth appearance in the finals of The International. Team Secret was defeated 3-0 by Tundra Esports.

Despite that strong performance, Team Secret started the following season with a last-place finish in the DPC's first Western Europea League tour. This saw Puppey and his team relegated to the lower division for the first time. Team Secret was promoted by finishing first in the lower division's second tour, but was relegated again by a last-place finish in the third tour. This forced Puppey and Team Secret into the qualifiers, where they finished fourth. As a result, Puppey failed to qualify for The International for the first time in the event's history.

In November 2024, Puppey played in 1win’s Fall Series Dota 2 tournament ($100 000 prize pool).

=== With Edge ===
In June 2025, Puppey left Team Secret to join Edge, marking his first time competing in South America. Edge bolstered its roster by adding Puppey as a stand‑in for payk ahead of PGL Wallachia Season 5

== Controversies ==
On 16 February 2016, former team manager Evany Chang accused Team Secret of not paying prize winnings to her and former players. On 9 October 2016, former player EternaLEnVy wrote a blog post detailing several instances of the organisation, in particular team director Kemal and Puppey, failing to pay players on time, lying about payments and sponsorships, and taking a 10% cut out of prize winnings without informing the players. Later that day, another former player, MiSeRy, released a blog raising similar issues, and claiming Secret did not pay him until he asked several times. He also backed EternaLEnVy's claim that Puppey was the only player aware of the organization taking a 10% cut.
