= JerAx =

Professional Dota 2 player

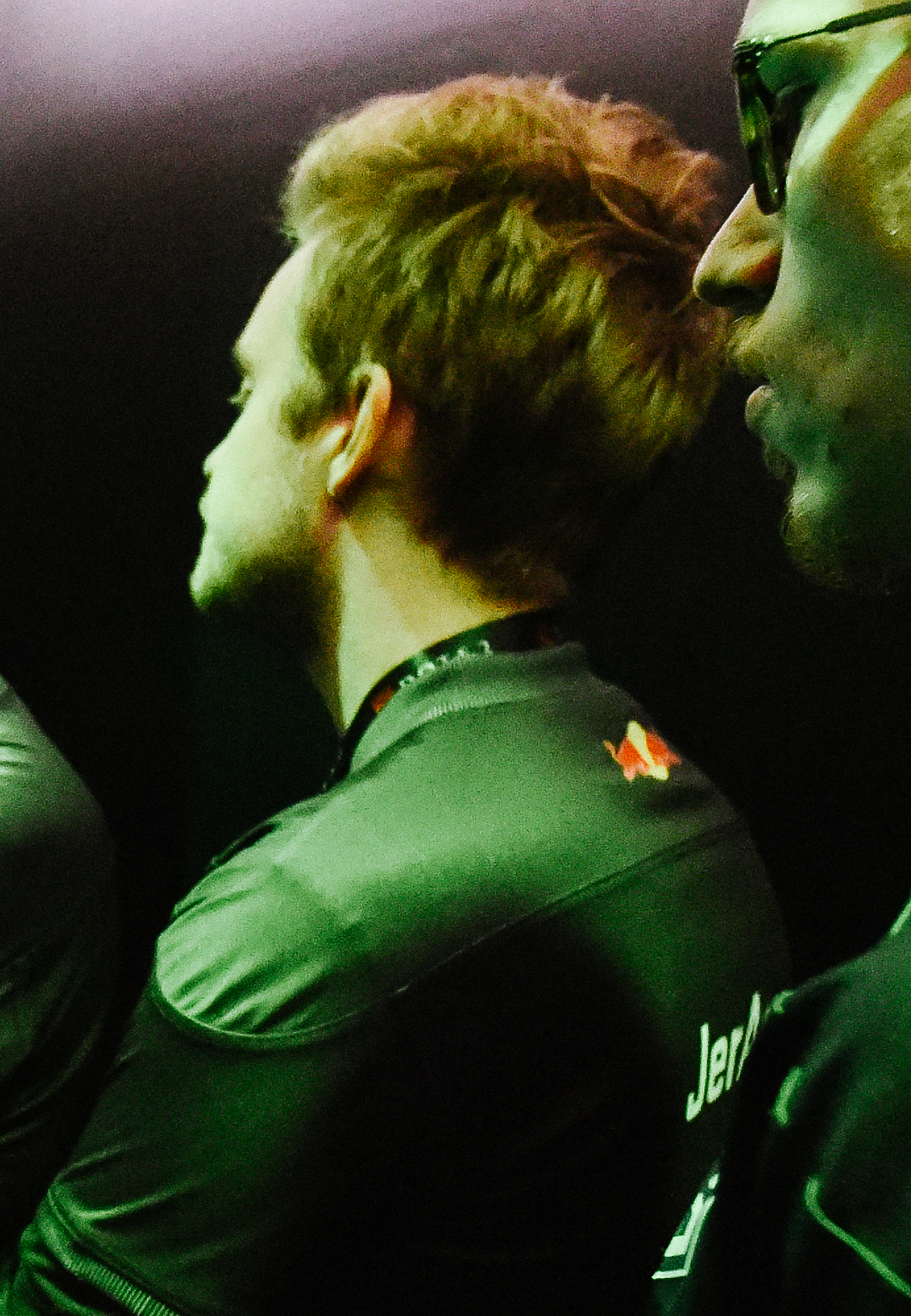
- Jesse (left) during The International 2018

Personal information
- Name: Jesse Vainikka
- Born: May 7, 1992 (age 34)

Career information
- Game: Defense of the Ancients; Dota 2
- Role: Semi-support

Jesse Vainikka (born May 7, 1992), better known as JerAx, is a retired Finnish professional Dota 2 player known for his playstyle with the hero Earth Spirit. He began his esports career in Heroes of Newerth before transitioning to Dota 2, where he had back-to-back victories at The International 2018 and The International 2019 with OG.

Jesse's professional career includes various roles and teams. After his success with OG, he briefly retired from competitive play but made a return to the scene as the captain of Evil Geniuses. He then joined Team Liquid as a coach in mid-2022.

== Career ==
External videos
- Get to know the Real JerAx | Unfold Jesse 'JerAx' Vainikka on YouTube, 29 January 2020.

Jesse began his career with the Finnish team Rat in the dark in 2013. Over the years, he became part of several international teams, including 5Jungz, Team Tinker, Team Liquid and OG. His achievements include being the first player to participate in four consecutive Dota 2 Major finals—Shanghai and Manila with Team Liquid, and Boston and Kiev with OG.

Jesse's career took off in 2015 when he joined 5jungz, a roster that later became Team Liquid. In 2016, he joined OG, where he won two Valve Majors and two The International titles, achieving historic success with the team. In 2018, he became the highest-earning individual player in esports, earning US$2,290,631.60 in prize money from Dota 2 championships.

In an interview with esports journalist Duncan "Thorin" Shields, Jesse clarified that he left Team Liquid by choice due to his declining mental health. He cited stress, near burnout, low self-esteem and difficult living conditions as reasons for his departure.

In 2020, Jesse auctioned his old gaming chair, which had the Team Liquid logo, to benefit the charity Save the Children. The auction, conducted in collaboration with the Finnish talk show Valavuori Live, resulted in a sum of €5,300, surpassing the auction prices of signed jerseys from renowned football players Lionel Messi and Wayne Rooney. On December 9, 2022, Jesse announced his retirement from professional Dota 2, saying that his passion for the game was lost. He returned briefly in 2021 for a six-month tenure with Evil Geniuses (EG). He came out of retirement and joined Evil Geniuses for his return to competitive play in the Dota Pro Circuit. In a post-match interview, Jesse mentioned his past experiences with Evil Geniuses' coach, Kanishka Sam "BuLba" Sosale and his admiration for teammates Andreas Franck "Cr1t-" Nielsen and Artour "Arteezy" Babaev made him join EG.

He later moved into a coaching role with Team Liquid. During his time with Team Liquid, the team faced a turbulent season but managed to qualify for The International 11 (TI11) through the Last Chance Qualifier and achieved a third-place finish at the event. He left Team Liquid in December 2022.
