= N0tail =

Danish-Faroese professional Dota 2 player (born 1993)

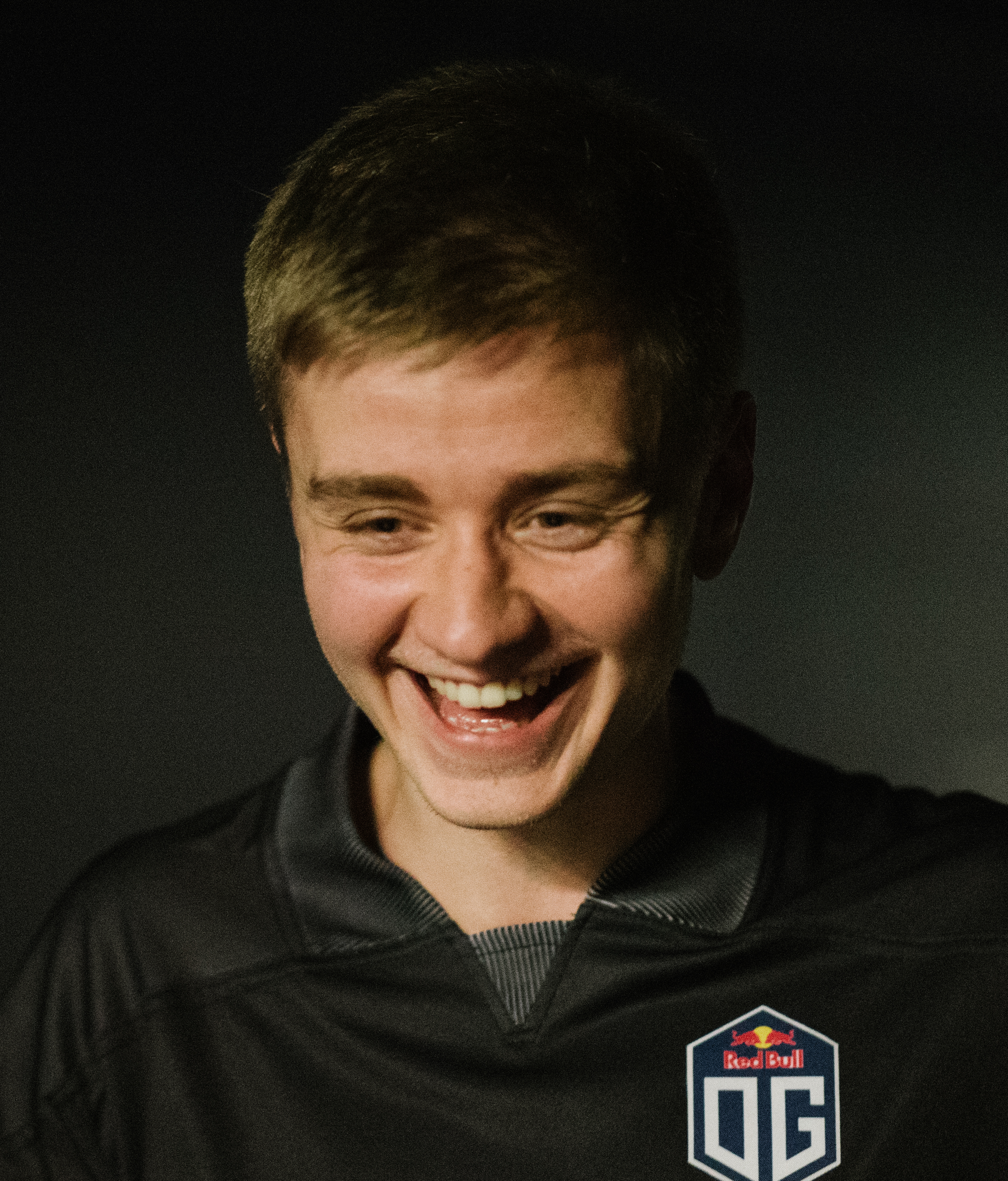
- N0tail in 2018

Personal information
- Name: Johan Sundstein
- Born: 8 October 1993 (age 33)
- Nationality: Danish

Current team
- Team: OG
- Role: Support, Captain
- Game: Dota 2
- Status: Inactive

Career information
- Games: Heroes of Newerth; Dota 2

Team history
- 2012–2014: Fnatic
- 2014–2015: Team Secret
- 2015: Cloud9
- 2015–present: OG

Career highlights and awards
- 2× The International champion (2018, 2019); 4× Dota Major champion (Frankfurt, Manila, Boston, Kiev)

Johan Sundstein (born 8 October 1993), better known as N0tail, is a Danish and Faroese professional Dota 2 player for OG. As a member of OG, he has played in four iterations of The International, winning in 2018 and 2019, and has also won four Major championships.

== Early years ==
Sundstein was born on 8 October 1993, and raised in Denmark to Faroese parents; former Faroese prime minister Jógvan Sundstein is his grandfather. Sundstein first began playing video games when he was two years old, beginning with Mario on the Nintendo Game Boy and Pokémon. Sundstein left high school early to fully devote himself to esports. Sundstein became one of the youngest professional Heroes of Newerth player at the early age of 15, playing the role of solo middle back then. He started by playing random pub games on HoN servers and later on decided to match up with Jascha "NoVa" Markuse and Tal "Fly" Aizik. They were recognized by the manager of Fnatic, who took them under his wing as an unofficial side project. This set off the beginning of Johan's professional career in esports.

== Professional career ==
=== Heroes of Newerth ===
N0tail, at the age of 15, met Jascha "NoVa" Markuse and Tal "Fly" Aizik in-game where they decided to start playing together. The trio became an unofficial side project of Fnatic manager Danijel "StreeT" Remus. After changes in the existing Fnatic Heroes of Newerth roster and the performance of N0tail and his friends, the group merged with the original Fnatic players Henrik "FreshPro" Hansen and Kalle "Trixi" Saarinen. Soon, the squad began to achieve wins in online tournaments, obtaining their first LAN victory in DreamHack Winter 2011. Along with his team Johan was able to secure 1st place victories in four consecutive DreamHack events.

=== Dota 2 ===
Due to decreasing activity in the professional Heroes of Newerth scene, N0tail decided to transfer to Fnatic's European Dota 2 team together with Jascha Markuse, Tal Aizik and Adrian Kryeziu on 30 March 2012. After a hard start to DotA, N0tail and his team Fnatic.EU won Thor Open LAN on 9 December 2012, beating No Tidehunter, now known as Alliance. Since Fnatic.EU won the LAN, they mostly dominated the pro scene until The International 2013, in which they placed 7–8th after losing to team Orange, which turned out to currently be the Fnatic squad.

One year later after not winning any premier tournaments and placing 13–14th in The International 2014, N0tail announced that he is leaving Fnatic together with Fly to create Team Secret, inviting Puppey, s4, and Kuroky to join. After a number of good finishes in five tournaments, Puppey decided to kick N0tail for Arteezy in preparation of the Dota 2 Asia Championships. N0tail decided to join Cloud9, replacing Aui 2000. Following multiple disappointing finishes and 9–12th place in The International 2015, Cloud9 released its squad. On 28 August 2015, it was announced that N0tail, together with his teammate Fly which was also kicked from Team Secret, have created (monkey) Business, a team featuring Miracle-, MoonMeander, Cr1t-, Fly, and N0tail.

Following promising performances, (monkey) Business proceeded to become OG. They quickly became the first team to defend a Major title in Dota 2 history after winning the Autumn Major in 2016. Despite a slow start during The International 2018's group stage, OG finished fourth and were seeded into the upper bracket of the main event. Considered underdogs during their entire time at the event, OG and Sundstein advanced to the grand finals and won the tournament by defeating PSG.LGD in the best-of-five series 3–2. The following year, he won The International 2019, making him and the rest of the team the first repeat winners of an International. N0tail was featured in Forbes 30 under 30 category at the age of 25. N0tail is the highest earning esports pro of all time in terms of prize money, making over $7 million in his career.

== Achievements ==
Place	Tournament	Date
7–8	The International 2013	August 2013
13–14	The International 2014	July 2014
9–12	The International 2015	August 2015
1st Place	Frankfurt Major	December 2015
7	Shanghai Major	March 2016
1st Place	Manila Major	June 2016
1st Place	ESL One Frankfurt 2016	June 2016
9–12	The International 2016	August 2016
1st Place	Boston Major	December 2016
1st Place	Kiev Major	April 2017
7–8	The International 2017	August 2017
1st Place	Mars Dota League Macau	December 2017
1st Place	The International 2018	August 2018
1st Place	The International 2019	August 2019
