= Ceb (gamer) =

French Dota 2 player

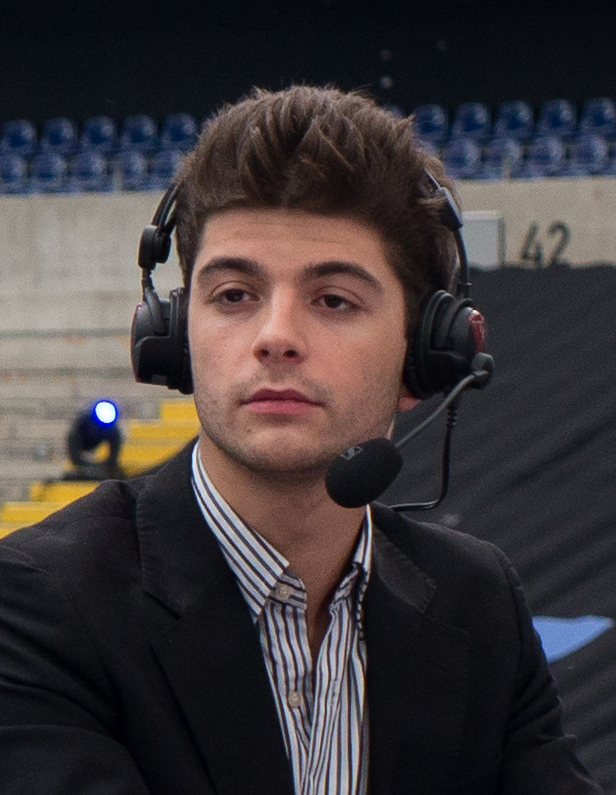
- Debs at ESL One Frankfurt in 2014

Personal information
- Name: Sébastien Debs
- Nickname(s): 7ckngMad, 7Mad
- Born: 11 May 1992 (age 34)
- Nationality: Lebanese, French

Career information
- Games: Dota 2
- Playing career: 2011–2021
- Role: Offlane
- Coaching career: 2016–2018

Team history

As player:
- 2011: Team Shakira
- 2012: Mortal Teamwork
- 2013: Sigma
- 2014: Denial eSports
- 2015: Alliance
- 2018–2021: OG
- 2022–2023: Old G
- 2023-: OG

As coach:
- 2016–2018: OG

Career highlights and awards
- As player: 2× The International champion (2018, 2019); As coach: 4× Dota Major champion (Frankfurt, Manila, Boston, Kiev)

Sébastien Debs (born 11 May 1992), better known as Ceb, is a Lebanese-French professional Dota 2 player who plays for OG. He won The International 2018 and 2019 as a player as well as four Dota Major Championships as a coach.

== Career ==
Debs' professional Dota 2 career started with Team Shakira in 2011. The team first gained notability after placing 4th in Dreamhack Winter 2011. He left the organisation and decided to join a rehash of Mortal Teamwork led by Troels "Synderen" Nielsen in 2012. His first The International tournament with the team ended up last in their group with a score of 3–11. Debs joined Alliance in 2015, but the team posted mediocre results and failed to qualify for The International 2015. In May 2016, OG invited him to coach a new founded organization. They were dominant at the Frankfurt, Manila, Boston and Kiev Majors. Following Resolut1on's departure from the team in March 2018, he was a substitute player before officially filling the offlane position for the team at The International 2018, where he also changed his in-game handle from 7ckngMad to Ceb. Along with the rest of OG, Debs became the first two-time winner of The International after the team's victory at The International 2019. In January 2020, he announced he would be leaving the active roster in order to develop other players on the team before rejoining the active roster that July.
