= Ahnberg =

Ahnberg may refer to:

- Ahnberg, South Dakota
- Henrik Ahnberg or AdmiralBulldog (born 1990), Swedish Dota 2 player
- Annika Åhnberg, Member of the Riksdag
