= CEB =

CEB or Ceb may refer to:

== Organizations ==
- CEB (high school), a chain of Mexican high schools
- CEB Inc., commercial firm that provides best practices research, executive education, and decision support tools
- Central Electricity Board, a board set up under The Electricity (Supply) Act 1926
- Ceylon Electricity Board, electricity company in Sri Lanka
- Commodity Exchange Bratislava, a commodity exchange in Slovakia
- Confederation of European Baseball, governing body for baseball and softball in Europe
- Confédération Européenne de Billard, governing body for billiards in Europe
- Continuing Education of the Bar, a California legal publisher
- Council of Elders of the Bundestag (Germany), a joint deliberative body
- Council of Europe Development Bank, an international lending institution to promote social cohesion
- United Nations Chief Executives' Board for Coordination, a high-level United Nations body

== Codes ==
- Articles related to Cebu, Philippines
  - CEB, IATA code for Mactan–Cebu International Airport
  - CEB, ICAO code for Cebu Pacific, a Filipino airline company
  - CEB, ISO provincial code for the province of Cebu
  - CEB, ISO language code for the Cebuano language

== Other uses ==
- The Graeco-Roman spelling of the Egyptian god Geb
- Čeb, old name for Čelarevo, Serbia
- CAAT enhancer binding, a regulatory sequence in DNA
- Census Enumerators' Books, books used by researchers in social science, local and family history
- Common English Bible, a new Bible translation, began in late 2008
- Compressed earth block, a block manufactured with a mechanical press
- Comunidades Eclesiais de Base, sub-units of parishes
- SSI CEB, a standard form factor for dual processor motherboards
- Sébastien "Ceb" Debs, an esports player
