= Athanasios Kartsabas =

Greek footballer (born in 1997)

Thanasis Kartsabas
Personal information
- Full name: Athanasios Kartsabas
- Date of birth: 3 June 1997 (age 29)
- Place of birth: Katerini, Greece
- Height: 1.95 m (6 ft 5 in)
- Position: Midfielder

Youth career
- Vataniakos

Senior career*
| Years | Team | Apps | (Gls) |
| 2015 | Pierikos | 0 | (0) |
| 2015–2017 | GAS Svoronos | | |
| 2017–2019 | Pierikos | 44 | (0) |
| 2019–2021 | Chania | 10 | (0) |
| 2021–2022 | Iraklis | 20 | (2) |
- * Club domestic league appearances and goals as of 11 September 2024

Athanasios 'Thanasis' Kartsabas (Greek: Αθανάσιος 'Θανάσης' Καρτσαμπάς; born 3 June 1997) is a Greek professional footballer who plays as a midfielder.

== Personal life ==
In addition to his football career, he is a professional Dota 2 player under the name dEsire. He has competed in numerous tours of the Dota Pro Circuit.
