= S4 (gamer) =

Swedish esports player (born 1992)

s4
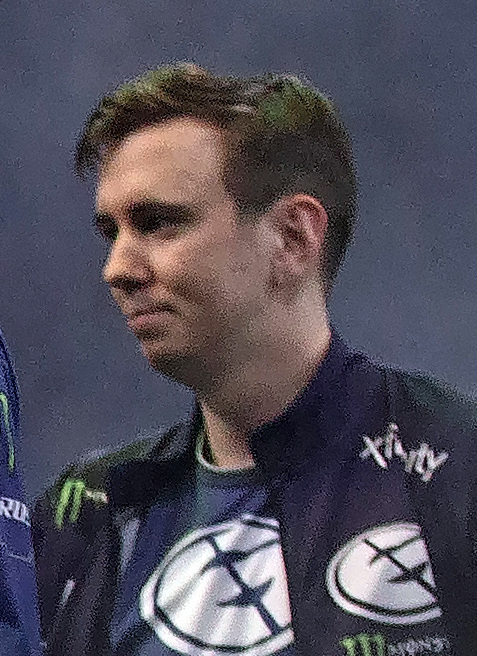
- Magnusson in 2018

Personal information
- Name: Gustav Magnusson
- Born: 1 April 1992 (age 34)
- Nationality: Swedish

Career information
- Game: Dota 2
- Playing career: 2012–present
- Role(s): Offlaner, Solo Middle

Team history
- 2013–2014: Alliance
- 2014–2015: Team Secret
- 2015: Alliance
- 2016–2018: OG
- 2018–2019: Evil Geniuses
- 2020–2021: Alliance

Career highlights and awards
- The International champion (2013); 2× Dota Major champion (Boston, Kiev)

Gustav Magnusson (born 1 April 1992), better known as s4, is a Swedish professional Dota 2 player. As a member of Alliance, s4 won The International 2013.

== Professional career ==
=== 2012: early career ===
s4's Dota 2 career started in early 2012 where he played at Dreamhack Summer 2012 with his team The Tough Bananas, however the team did not make the playoffs. In the fall of that same year he, along with AdmiralBulldog, created No Tidehunter (NTH). At the DreamHack Winter 2012 NTH defeated Evil Geniuses in the grand finals and secured first place in the team's first major tournament together.

=== 2013 ===
In 2013, NTH won several tournaments such as the StarLadder Season 5 LAN. In April 2013, s4, along with AdmiralBulldog, Akke, EGM, and Loda moved to Alliance - a world-renowned esports organization. With Alliance, they won the year's biggest tournament, The International 3, and without losing a series and only losing 3 games; two of which in the final best of 5-game series. As a result, s4 was the highest earning eSports player in 2013.

=== 2014 ===
In June 2014, s4 and Alliance won against Cloud9 in the Grand Final of DreamLeague Season 1 - making them the DreamLeague Season 1 champions. Unfortunately, s4 and Alliance placed 11th-12th at The International 2014 as they were eliminated early.

=== 2015 ===
After The International 2014 he decided to part ways with Alliance. He went on to create Team Secret with Clement "Puppey" Ivanov. Team Secret won the ESL One Frankfurt 2015. After Secret's disappointing placing in The International 2015 and the subsequent disbanding of the squad, s4 rejoined Alliance.

=== 2016 ===
Alliance qualified for The International 2016 as the runner-up to the Regional qualifier winners. They finished 3rd in Group A with 3 wins, 2 draws, and 2 losses. However, Alliance lost successive bracket stage matches to EHOME and Fnatic and ultimately finished 9th. As part of the annual post-The International roster shuffle, s4 left Alliance. On 31 August, s4 joined OG and later won the Boston Major.

=== 2017 ===
OG secured another Valve Major title at the Kiev Major 2017. Despite winning several Major tournaments, OG was eliminated on the 4th day of The International 2017 by LGD.

=== 2018 ===
In May 2018, he left OG to join Evil Geniuses. At The International 2018, s4 and EG placed third place securing $2,700,000 in prize money.

=== 2019 ===
At The International 2019, EG got eliminated by Team Liquid and exited the world tournament placing 5th-6th. Later in September, it was announced that he would be leaving the team.

=== 2020 ===
In 2020, s4 re-joined Alliance as captain and offlaner.
