= Moni Aizik =

Israeli martial artist

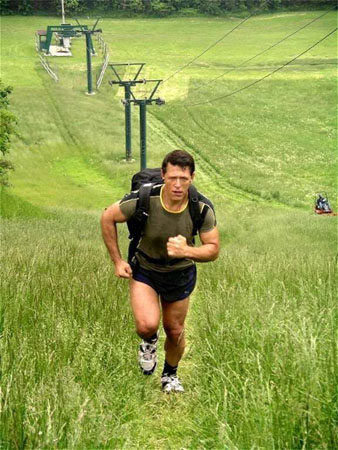
- Moni Aizik
- Born: Israel
- Native name: מוני אייזיק
- Style: Commando Krav Maga
- Teacher: Opa Schutte
- Rank: Black belt in Judo; Black belt in Jujutsu; Black belt in Krav Maga

Other information
- Notable students: Yael Arad; Fly (Dota player)
- Website: Commando Krav Maga

Moni Aizik (Hebrew: מוני אייזיק) is an Israeli-born martial artist. Aizik has a jujutsu and judo background and is the founder of Commando Krav Maga.

== Israel ==
At the age of eight, under Opa Schutte, Aizik started training in judo and jujutsu. He won national title in judo seven times.

Aizik states that he was asked, shortly after the Yom Kippur War, to improve upon the army's existing hand-to-hand combat system due to his knowledge of martial arts, including various Israeli fighting systems, jujitsu and judo.

After his military service he trained at a Maccabi Tel Aviv club in Israel: Krav maga(CKM), Jiujitsu, and Judo. One of Aizik's students was Yael Arad, a 1992 Olympic silver medalist in judo.

== North America ==
Moving to North America in the 1980s, Aizik started teaching CKM at the Jewish Community Center in Toronto, Ontario, and later opened The Samurai Club martial center where he taught Commando Krav maga, Judo, MMA and Jiujitsu. Among his students were the former UFC Welterweight Champion Carlos Newton and Joel Gerson. In 2006 Aizik start spreading Commando Krav maga (CKM) all over the world.

== Personal life ==
His son, Tal Aizik, is a professional Dota 2 player.
