= OG (esports) =

Esports organisation

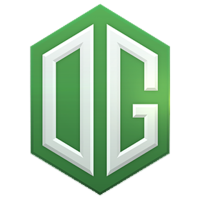
- Games: Dota 2; Counter-Strike 2; Rocket League; Honor of Kings
- Founded: August 2015; 11 years ago
- Location: Europe; Southeast Asia
- Owners: The Chiliz Group (51%)
- CEO: Xavier Oswald
- Head coach: Mikhail "Misha" Agatov (Dota 2); Casper "ruggah" Due (CS2)
- General manager: Manon Merloz
- Championships: 2× The International (2018, 2019) (Dota 2)
- Partners: Melbet; Socios.com; Dexsport; Secretlab; TMGM
- Website: ogs.gg

OG (also referred as OG Esports) is a professional esports organisation based in Europe and Southeast Asia. Formed in 2015, they are best known for their Dota 2 team who won The International 2018 and 2019 tournaments. They also have teams in Counter-Strike 2, Rocket League and Honor of Kings.

== History ==
=== Dota 2 ===
==== Foundation and early success (2015–2017) ====
OG was founded as "(monkey) Business" by players Tal "Fly" Aizik and Johan "N0tail" Sundstein, who were former Team Secret players, along with David "MoonMeander" Tan, Fritz "Frtz" DG, and Andreas "Cr1t-" Nielsen in August 2015. Soon after a dominating run through the European qualifiers for the Frankfurt Major, they adopted the moniker OG. They went on to win the inaugural Dota 2 Major Championship in Frankfurt in November 2015, earning US$1 million in prize money. Despite placing in the bottom half of the next Major in Shanghai in March 2016, the team would rebound and take first place at the Manila Major in June 2016, becoming the first team to repeat as champions of a Valve sponsored Dota 2 tournament.

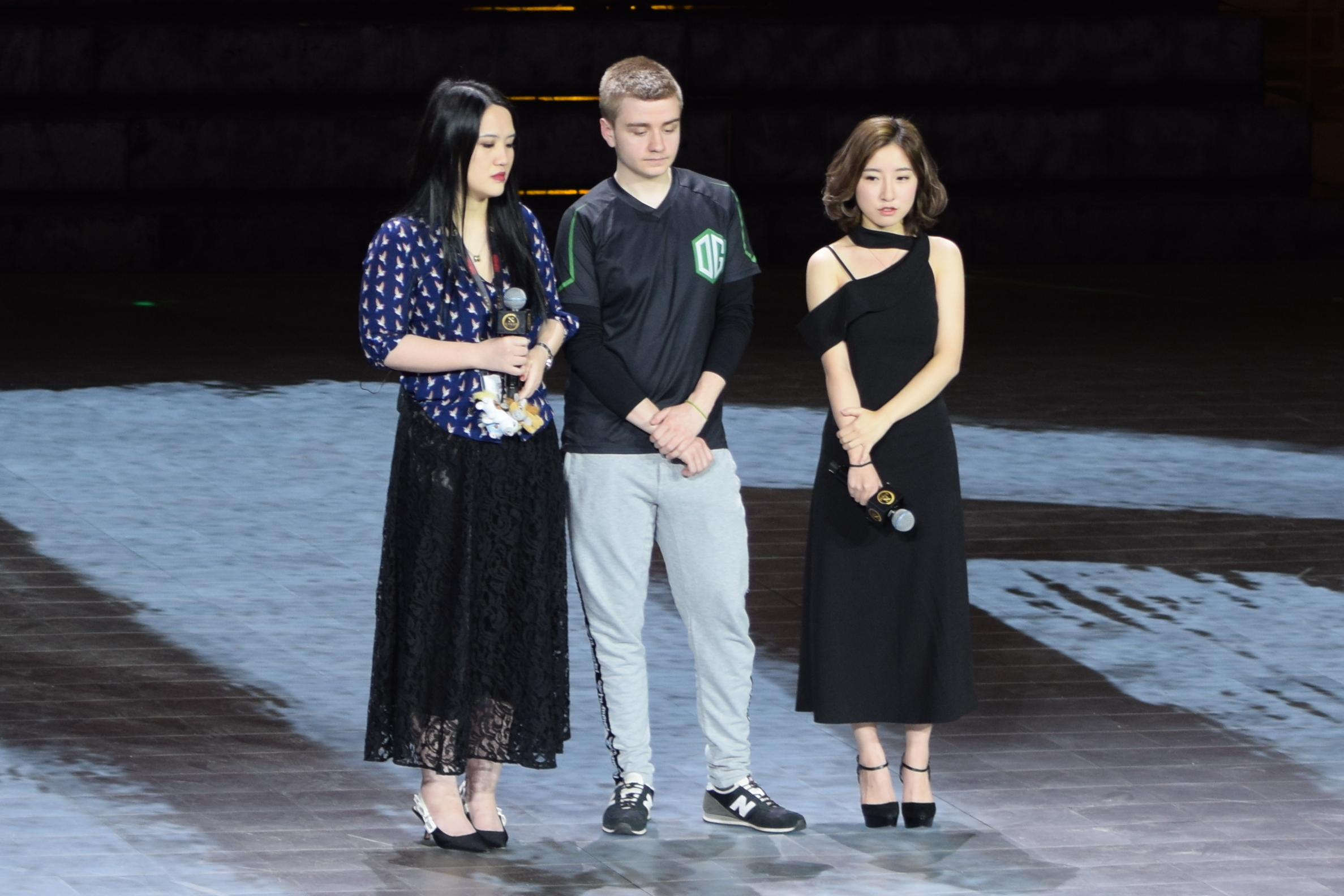
OG founder and captain Johan "N0tail" Sundstein during a post-game interview in 2017

OG during the Kiev Major

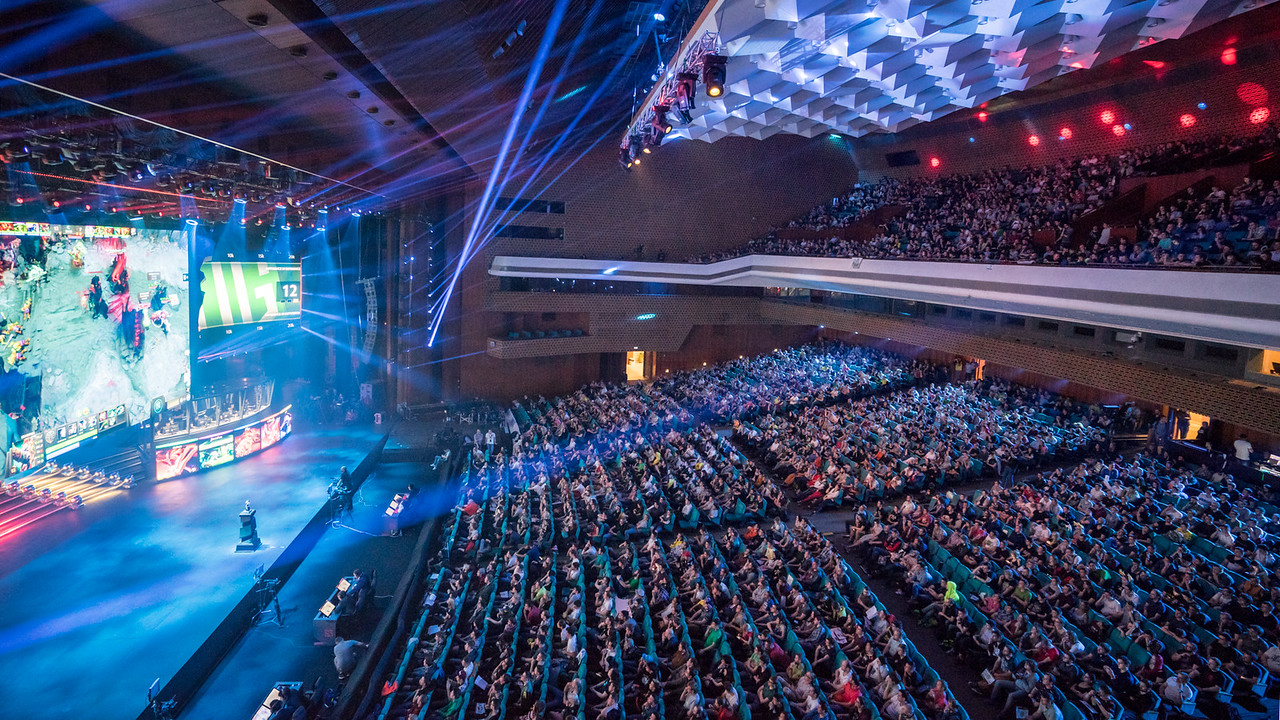
OG vs Virtus.pro

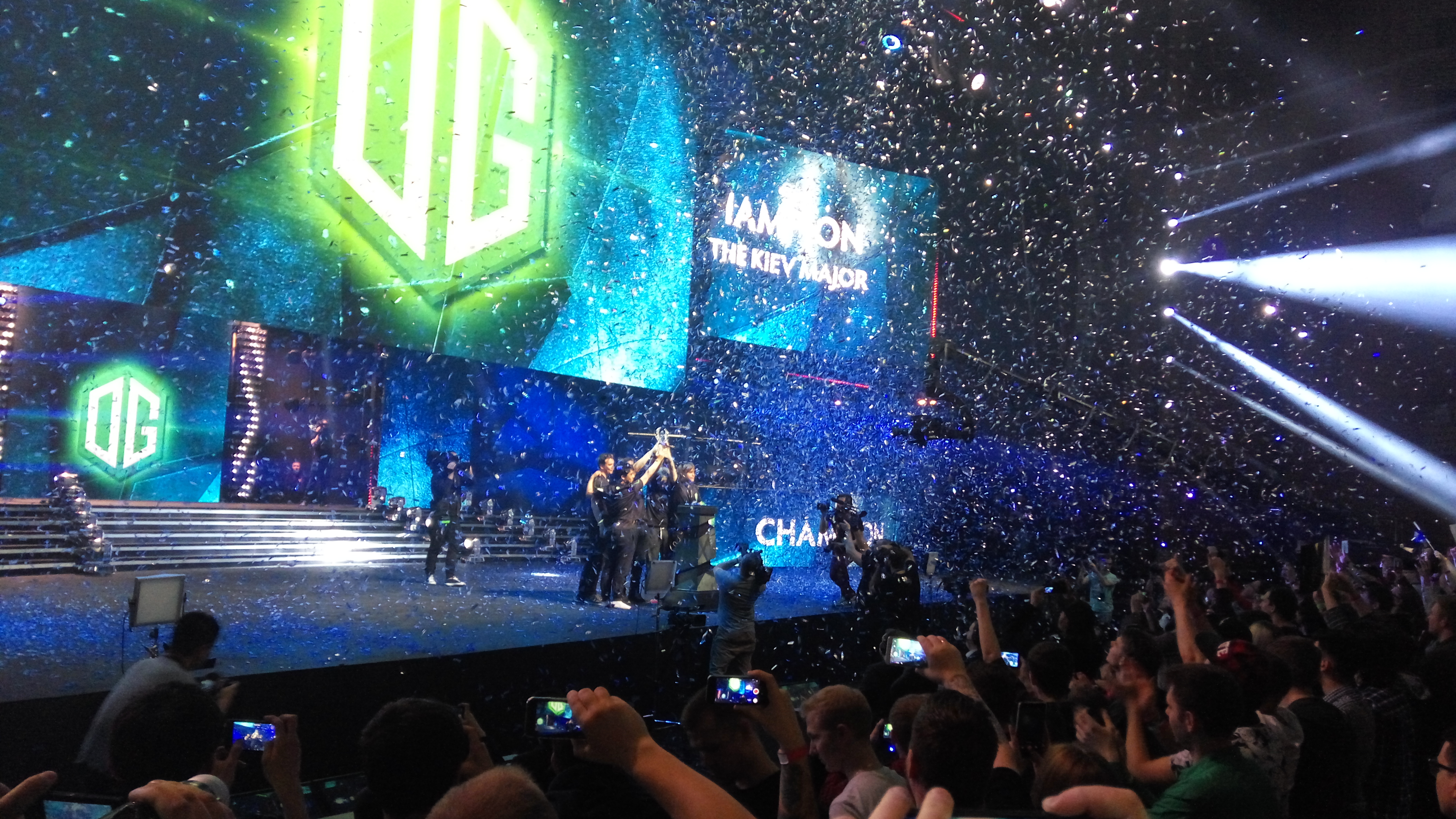
OG following their victory

OG entered The International 2016 as one of the favourites after earning a direct invite, but ended up finishing 9-12th out of 16 teams. In August 2016, MoonMeander, Miracle-, and Cr1t- left the team, with Gustav "s4" Magnusson, Anathan "ana" Pham, and Jesse "JerAx" Vainikka replacing them. Despite the new roster, OG won the Boston Major in December 2016, giving them their third Dota 2 Major championship. For the first premier tournament following Boston, OG advanced to the grand finals of the Dota 2 Asia Championships in Shanghai, where they were swept in a best-of-five series against Invictus Gaming. Following that, OG won the Kiev Major in a best of five series against Virtus.pro. At the Kiev event, the team made an appearance on Valve's True Sight documentary series.

==== The International victories (2018–2019) ====
OG during The International 2018

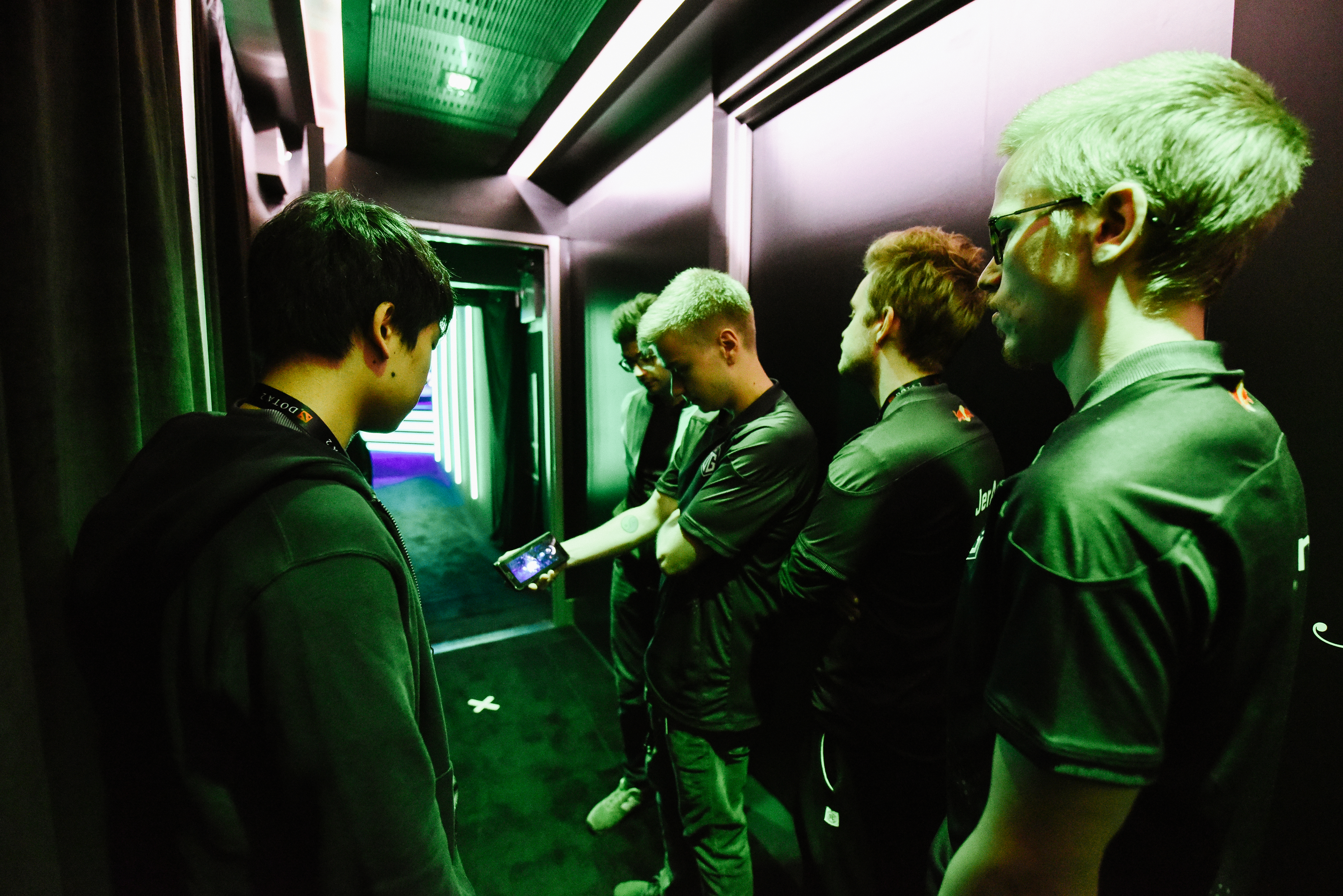
OG backstage

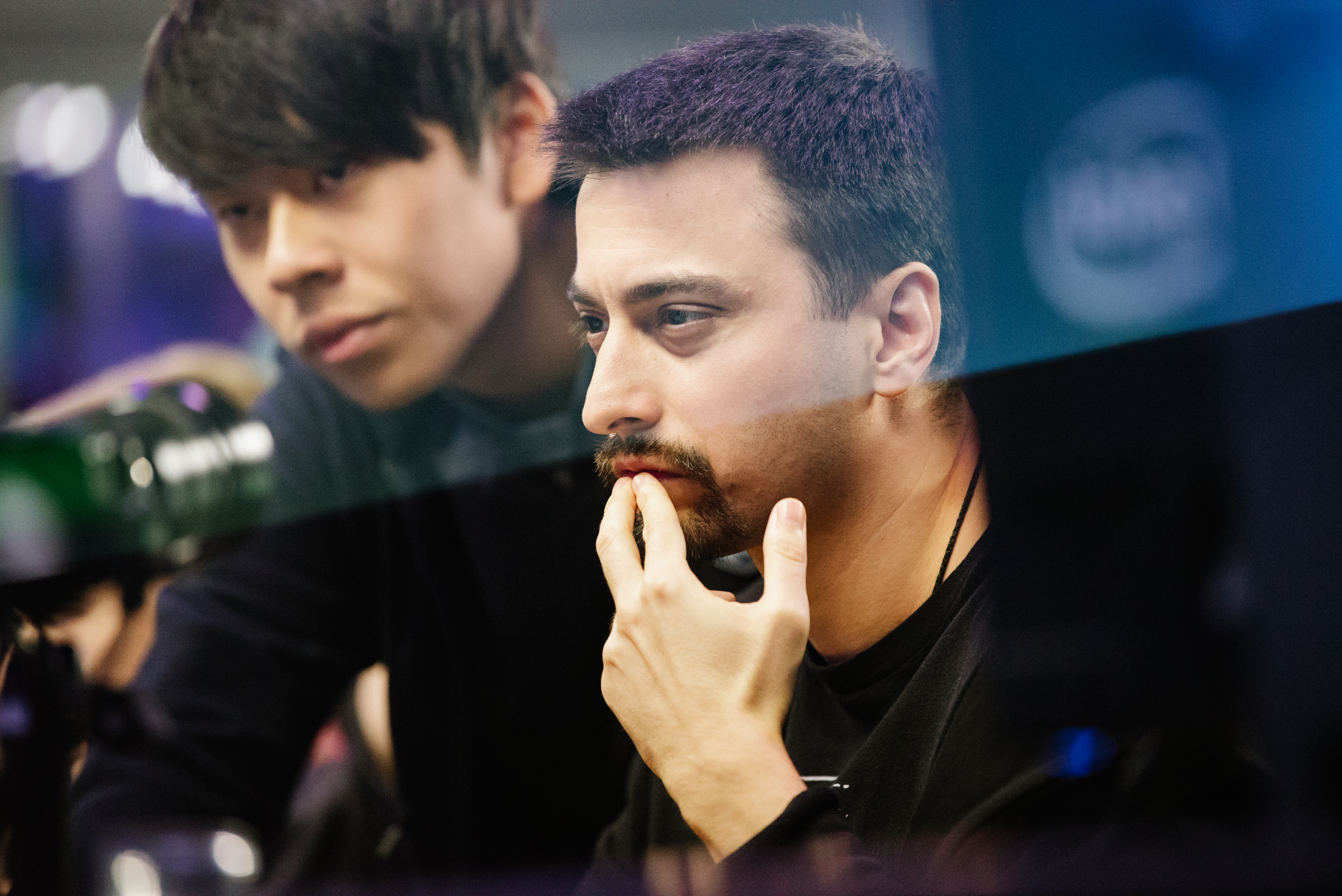
Former team coach Cristian "ppasarel" Banaseanu (foreground) and Anathan "ana" Pham prior to a match

In May 2018, the organisation signed James "Swedish Delight" Liu to represent the professional Super Smash Bros. fighting game scene. That same month, Fly and s4 left the team to join Evil Geniuses, with Roman "Resolut1on" Fominok joining VGJ.Storm. Due to post-deadline roster changes, OG would no longer be eligible to be directly invited to The International 2018 nor for the Regional Qualifiers and were required to play through the Open Qualifiers. Needing three new members just a few weeks before the qualifiers began, OG quickly signed Topias "Topson" Taavitsainen, a newcomer to the scene who had never performed at a major LAN event prior to the event, Sébastien "Ceb" Debs, who had previously served as the team's coach, and ana, returning to the team from a year-long break after their previous elimination at The International 2017. Finishing outside of the top eight in the Dota Pro Circuit final standings, which granted a direct invite to The International 2018, OG earned theirs by playing through and winning the European-region open qualifiers.

Following that, OG were then placed into group A of The International's group stage, finishing fourth with a record of 9–7, which seeded them into the upper bracket. There, OG won every series to advance to the grand finals. Facing the lower bracket winner PSG.LGD in it, whom OG had just defeated in the upper bracket finals, OG won the game one, but lost the next two games. Needing another win to avoid losing the series, OG forced a late-game comeback in game four, and subsequently won game five in a similar fashion, making them International champions and winning them over $11 million in prize money. Their victory was considered a Cinderella and underdog success story, as they had come from the open qualifiers and had beaten some of the more favoured and accomplished teams along the way. Their win also broke the historical trend of Chinese teams winning the International in even-numbered years.

In November 2018, ana left the team after deciding to take a break from the professional scene, with Per Anders "Pajkatt" Olsson Lille and Igor "iLTW" Filatov substituting for him until he returned in March 2019. In April 2019, the team played against and lost to the OpenAI Five, a group of artificial intelligence bots that learned to play the game entirely through machine learning, in a live exhibition series in San Francisco. Later that month, Titouan "Sockshka" Merloz replaced Cristian "ppasarel" Banaseanu as team coach.

The team earned a direct invite to The International 2019 by finishing in the top 12 of that season's Dota Pro Circuit. There, they went 14–2 in the group stage, advancing through the upper bracket before defeating Team Liquid in the grand finals 3–1, making them the first ever repeat champion of an International, being awarded $15.6 million out of the $34 million prize pool.

==== Restructuring (2020–present) ====
The Dota 2 team went through various changes in January 2020, with ana leaving to take another extended hiatus until the next Dota Pro Circuit season, JerAx announcing his retirement, and Ceb leaving the active roster to help focus on developing other players on the team. To replace them, the team signed Syed "Sumail" Hassan, Yeik "MidOne" Nai Zheng, and Martin "Saksa" Sazdov. Sumail was released from the team in July 2020, with Ceb rep lacing him as a player.

In March 2021, MidOne was removed from the roster, with ana briefly returning to the roster before announcing his retirement in June. Shortly after, the team re-signed Sumail. OG qualified to The International 2021 via regional qualifiers, but were eliminated 2–0 in the lower bracket to the tournament's eventual champion Team Spirit. In April 2021, OG announced the news on its official website that OG and German car brand BMW announced a partnership. In November 2021, the roster underwent significant changes as Sumail and Saksa were released, Ceb announcing his retirement from professional play, while Topson and N0tail left the active roster after deciding to take a break from the professional scene.

In November 2021, OG announced an entirely new roster consisting of Artem "Yuragi" Golubiev, Bozhidar "bzm" Bogdanov, Ammar "ATF" Al-Assaf, Tommy "Taiga" Le, and Mikhail "Misha" Agatov, who had previously served as the team's coach. In May 2022, OG qualified to and participated in the ESL One 2022 Stockholm Major, with Ceb and N0tail standing in for Misha and head coach Evgenii "Chuvash" Makarov respectively. Through the lower bracket, OG won their fifth Dota 2 Major, by defeating TSM FTX 3–1 in the grand finals. In August 2022, the team found further success at ESL One Malaysia 2022, defeating Team Aster 3–0 in the grand finals with Chuvash standing in for Misha due to visa issues.

OG participated in the 1win Series Dota 2 Fall tournament, held in November, 2024, competing for a total prize pool of US$100,000.

In November 2025, the team relocated their region to Southeast Asia from Europe. They are now participating in the PGL Wallachia Season 6 after acquiring the roster of Team Aureus who qualified for this tournament which makes this their debut as a Southeast Asian club and an all Filipino club.

=== Financial backing and ownership ===
OG were members of the Esports World Cup Foundation Club Support Program, funded by Saudi Arabia's Public Investment Fund, in 2024.The program gave teams monetary rewards for painting the Esports World Cup tournament series in a positive light and driving engagement to the tournament. This is seen to some as a sportswashing tool that Saudi Arabia is using to distract the public from their poor human rights record. OG weren't invited to the Esports World Cup Club Partner Program in 2025.

On 16 September 2025, The Chiliz Group, operators of the Chiliz blockchain and the Socios.com platform, announced that they had acquired a 51% majority stake in OG. The team have a "fan token" on the Socios platform with the ticker $OG, which became the first such token for an esports organization on the platform to hit a US$100 million market cap.

== Rosters ==
=== Dota 2 ===
OG Dota 2 roster
Players
Coaches

Role	Handle	Name	Nationality
Carry	1	Natsumi-	Vargas, John Anthony	Philippines
Midlane	2	Yopaj	Ferrer, Erin Jasper	Philippines
Offlaner	3	Raven	Fausto, Polo	Philippines
Support	4	TIMS	Randrup, Timothy	Philippines
Support	5	skem	Ong, Rolen Andrei Gabriel	Philippines

Head coach

Adam Shah (343)

Legend:
- (I) Inactive
- (S) Suspended
- Substitute
- (injured) Injury / Illness

Roster updated July 07, 2026.

=== Counter-Strike: Global Offensive ===
In December 2019, OG announced they had formed a Counter-Strike: Global Offensive team, with the organisation signing veterans Nathan "NBK-" Schmitt and Valdemar "valde" Bjørn Vangså, along with Aleksi "Aleksib" Virolainen, Issa "ISSAA" Murad and Mateusz "mantuu" Wilczewski. Following that, the team signed Casper "ruggah" Due as the team coach in January. In September 2020, ruggah was implicated in the coaching bug scandal. As a result, the Esports Integrity Commission (ESIC) and Valve banned ruggah from participating in one Valve-sponsored Major Championship. In February 2021, the team removed NBK- from the active roster, with ISSAA following suit shortly after. To replace them, the team signed Nikolaj "niko" Kristensen in March 2021, and Shahar "flameZ" Shushan a month later.

In January 2022, OG traded Aleksib for Nemanja "nexa" Isaković from G2 Esports, who was a part of the team that was the runner-up in the PGL Major Stockholm 2021. After failing to qualify for the PGL Major Antwerp 2022, OG benched valde and niko in May 2022. To replace them, OG signed Adam "NEOFRAG" Zouhar and Maciej "F1KU" Miklas. A few months later, the organization replaced the last founding member of the original roster, mantuu, with Abdulkhalik "degster" Gasanov.

On 8 June 2023, niko ended his stint as a stand-in for OG, becoming a free agent. Later that month, on 19 June, OG announced its intention to rebuild its roster around a core of F1KU, nexa and Iulian "regali" Harjău, following the departure of flameZ to Team Vitality. Finally, on 20 June, OG transfer listed NEOFRAG and degster, leaving only F1KU as an active member of the roster.

On 30 June 2023, OG announced the signings of Iulian "regali" Harjău, Nils "k1to" Gruhne, and Dion "FASHR" Derksen, along with the return of nexa to the active roster. NEOFRAG transferred to Into The Breach on 11 July 2023.

=== Counter-Strike 2 ===
On 14 November 2023, OG announced the benching of FASHR, followed by the transfer of nexa to in a return G2 on 21 November. OG announced the signing of MOUZ academy player Bram "Nexius" Campana on 21 December 2023, and completed their roster on 4 January 2024, following the signing of Israeli player Nikita "HeavyGod" Martynenko.

OG Counter-Strike 2 roster
Players
Coaches

Handle	Name	Nationality
spooke	Grundström, Olle	Sweden
adamb	Ångström, Adam	Sweden
cadiaN	Møller, Casper	Denmark
bodyy	Pianaro, Alexandre	France
pr1metapz	Voigt, Luca	Germany
arrozdoce (I)	Wing, Rafael	Portugal

Head coach

Lambert "Lambert" Prigent

Legend:
- (I) Inactive
- (S) Suspended
- Substitute
- (injured) Injury / Illness

Roster updated 20 May 2026.

=== Rocket League ===
On 18 January 2024, OG would announce their first ever Rocket League roster that competes in the North America (NA) region.

OG Rocket League roster
Players
Coaches

Handle	Name	Nationality
noly	Kidd, Joseph	United Kingdom
JKnaps	Knapman, Jacob	Canada
comm	Kyser, Robert	United States

Head coach

Kyle "torment" Storer

Legend:
- (I) Inactive
- (S) Suspended
- Substitute
- (injured) Injury / Illness

Roster updated 18 January 2024.

=== Valorant ===
The team formed a Valorant division in 2021. In May 2022, OG formed a partnership with the British esports organization, LDN UTD, to compete during the 2022 EMEA Valorant Champions Tour Stage 2. In September 2022, the roster disbanded after OG LDN UTD failed to make the EMEA Valorant partnered team league.

== Logo gallery ==
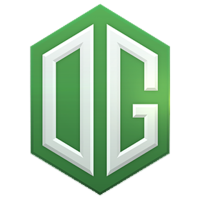
Original logo (currently)

Former logo with partnership of Red Bull

Awards and achievements
Preceded by Team Liquid	The International winners 2018 and 2019; With: ana, Topson, Ceb, JerAx, N0tail	Succeeded by Team Spirit
