= Wings Gaming =

Chinese esports organization

- Short name: Wings
- Divisions: Dota 2
- Founded: August 2014
- Folded: April 2017
- Based in: Chongqing
- Location: China

Wings Gaming was a Chinese Dota 2 esports team based in Chongqing. They were best known for winning over US$9 million at The International 2016 (TI6), which was one of the most lucrative esports tournaments in history. Wings were founded in the aftermath of post-The International 2014 roster shuffles in China, with the TI6 winning roster being put together in August 2015.

Wings were nominated in the best non-Olympic athlete category of the 2016 Chinese Top 10 Laureus Sport Awards, becoming the first esports team to be nominated. They were also nominated as esports team of the year at The Game Awards 2016. Just before the team played at the Kiev Major tournament in April 2017, all five of the playing members left the team, playing under the banner of Team Random at the event. Team Random disbanded following a bottom placed finish at the event, with most of the members taking a break from the professional scene. The team briefly reunited for an exhibition match at the Chongqing Major in 2019.

== Former roster ==
Alias	Name
shadow	Chu Zeyu
bLink	Zhou Yang
Faith_bian	Zhang Ruida
y` (Captain)	Zhang Yiping
iceice	Li Peng

== Notable achievements ==
=== 2015 ===
- 17–20th – Dota 2 Asia Championships

=== 2016 ===
- 1st – ESL One Manila 2016
- 13–16th – Manila Major
- 2nd – Nanyang Dota 2 Championships Season 2
- 1st – The Summit 5
- 1st – The International 2016
- 1st – Nanyang Cruise Cup
- 1st – Northern Arena BEAT Invitational
- 4th – The Summit 6
- 9–16th – Boston Major

=== 2017 ===
- 3–4th – ESL One Genting
- 9th–12th – Dota 2 Asia Champions 2017

Awards and achievements
Preceded by Evil Geniuses	The International winner 2016; With: shadow, bLink, Faith_bian, y`, iceice	Succeeded by Team Liquid
