= PSG.LGD =

Dota 2 division of PSG Esports

- Game: Dota 2
- Founded: April 2018; 8 years ago
- Folded: September 2023; 2 years ago
- Based in: Shanghai, China
- Partners: Monster Energy
- Parent group: LGD Gaming; PSG Esports
- Website: en.psg.fr/esports

PSG.LGD was a professional Dota 2 team based in China. They were formed as a partnership between PSG Esports and LGD Gaming in April 2018 until the end of the partnership in September 2023. PSG.LGD has finished as the runner-up in The International 2018 and 2021.

== History ==
=== 2017–2019 ===
The original Dota 2 division of the Chinese-based esports organization LGD Gaming was founded in 2009. The team had varying degrees of success, participating in and winning multiple tournaments and events over a nine-year span. In April 2018, French football club Paris Saint-Germain F.C. invested in the organization, sponsoring and rebranding the Dota 2 team as PSG.LGD. The team found instant success by winning two Majors of the 2017-2018 Dota Pro Circuit, which helped them secure a direct invite to The International 2018. There, they advanced to the grand finals but lost against OG again in five games.

Following that, the roster remained together for the next season, where they received a direct invite to The International 2019 after securing a top 12 finish in that year's Dota Pro Circuit rankings. The team was placed in Group A, finishing with a 13–3 record which guaranteed a place in the upper bracket. There, the team defeated Virtus.pro and Vici Gaming before losing once again to OG in the upper bracket grand final. The team was placed in the lower bracket final against Team Liquid, losing the series 2–1 to earn them 3rd place and therefore a total of $3,089,706.

=== 2020–2022 ===
After that loss, the team went through various changes, with notable members Xu "fy" Linsen and Lu "Maybe" Yao leaving the organization in September 2020, while Yang "Chalice" Shenyi and Yap "xNova" Jian Wei were transferred to EHOME later that month. To replace them, the team signed former member Wang "Ame" Chunyu, Cheng "NothingToSay" Jin Xiang, Zhao "XinQ" Zixing, along with Zhang "Faith_bian" Ruida and Zhang "y`" Yiping, who won The International 2016 with Wings Gaming. The team found immediate success by winning the WePlay AniMajor against Evil Geniuses 3–0.

The team continued with their strong form during The International 2021, going 15–1 in the group stage to advance to the upper bracket. There, the team won every series to advance to the grand finals by defeating T1, Virtus.pro and Team Secret but ultimately falling to Team Spirit in the best-of-five series 3–2, after nearly staging a reverse-sweep.

With the organization electing to not make any roster changes, the team continued their strong form into the 2022 season after facing off against in a series of rematches against Team Spirit. The first of two rematches led to a second-place finish at the PGL Arlington Major after losing the final 3–1, while the team won the inaugural Riyadh Masters with a 2–0 score.

The team secured an invite to The International 2022, where despite being touted as favorites to win the event, the team placed 5th–6th at the event after losing to Team Aster.

=== 2023 ===
In April 2023, the roster was unable to participate in DreamLeague Season 19 due to visa problems. However, the organization assured that the team will have time to solve all the problems and will arrive at the beginning of ESL One Berlin Major 2023.

Before the start of The International 2023, the partnership between the two teams expired in September 2023. With this change, the roster will revert back to playing under the LGD Gaming banner.

== Final roster ==
The International 2024: China Qualifier Squad
ID	Name	Position	Join Date	Leave Date	New Team
shiro	Guo Xuanang	1	2022-12-08[66]	2024-09-10[79]	Team Tidebound
Echo	Xu Ziliang	2	2024-05-22[78]	2024-09-10[79]	Team Tidebound
niu	Li Kongbo	3	2023-05-13[70]	2024-09-10[79]	Azure Ray
Pyw	Xiong Jiahan	4	2023-11-28[74]	2024-09-10[79]	Team Zero (Sub)
y`	Zhang Yiping	5	2020-09-16[62]	2024-09-10[79]	Team Tidebound

== Achievements ==
Date	Place	Tier	Tournament	Result	Prize
2022-07-24	1st	Tier 1	Riyadh Masters 2022	2 : 0	$1,500,000
2021-10-17	2nd	Tier 1	The International 2021	2 : 3	$5,202,400
2021-06-13	1st	Tier 1	WePlay AniMajor	3 : 0	$200,000
2019-08-25	3rd	Tier 1	The International 2019	1 : 2	$3,089,706
2018-08-25	2nd	Tier 1	The International 2018	2 : 3	$4,085,148
2018-05-20	1st	Tier 1	MDL Changsha Major	3 : 0	$400,000
2018-05-06	1st	Tier 1	EPICENTER XL	3 : 1	$500,000
2017-08-11	4th	Tier 1	The International 2017	0 : 2	$1,728,154
2015-08-08	3rd	Tier 1	The International 2015	0 : 2	$2,211,554
2015-05-23	1st	Tier 1	i-League Season 3	3 : 0	$214,184
