= The International 2021 =

2021 esports tournament

Tournament information
- Game: Dota 2
- Location: Bucharest, Romania
- Dates: October 7–17, 2021
- Administrator: Valve
- Tournament formats: Group stage; Round robin; Main event; Double elimination
- Venue: Arena Națională
- Participants: 18 teams
- Purse: US$40,018,195

Final positions
- Champions: Team Spirit
- 1st runner-up: PSG.LGD
- 2nd runner-up: Team Secret

The International 2021, also known as The International 10 (TI10), was the tenth iteration of The International, an annual Dota 2 world championship esports tournament. Hosted by Valve, the game's developer, the tournament followed a year-long series of tournaments awarding qualifying points, known as the Dota Pro Circuit (DPC), with the top 12 ranking teams being directly invited to the tournament. In addition, six more teams earned invites through regional qualifiers held earlier in 2021. The tournament took place in Bucharest, Romania, with the main event held behind closed doors at the Arena Națională due to restrictions on gatherings in the city.

As with every International from 2013 onwards, the prize pool was crowdfunded by the Dota 2 community via its battle pass feature with the total reaching US$40 million, making it the largest esports prize pool in history. The event was also the first International held since 2019, as the 2020 iteration was cancelled due to the COVID-19 pandemic. The Grand Finals were held between PSG.LGD and Team Spirit, with the latter winning 3–2 in a best-of-five series.

== Background ==
Dota 2 is a 2013 multiplayer online battle arena (MOBA) video game developed by Valve. In it, two teams of five players compete by selecting characters known as "heroes", each with a variety of innate skills and abilities, and cooperate together to be the first to destroy the base of the other team, which ends the match. The game is played from a top-down perspective, and the player sees a segment of the game's map near their character as well as a mini-map that shows their allies, with any enemies revealed outside the fog of war. The game's map has three roughly symmetric "lanes" between each base, with a number of defensive towers protecting each side. Periodically, the team's base spawns a group of weak CPU-controlled creatures, called "creeps", that march down each of the three lanes towards the opponents' base, fighting any enemy hero, creep, or structure they encounter. If a hero character is killed, that character respawns back at their base after a delay period, which gets progressively longer the farther into the match.

As with previous years of the tournament, a corresponding battle pass for Dota 2 was released in June 2021, allowing the prize pool to be crowdfunded by players of the game, who purchase the pass both to support the tournament and to access the rewards within it. A quarter of all revenue made by it was added directly towards the prize pool, which finalized at US$40,018,195. At the time of event, Dota 2 featured 121 playable characters, called "heroes". Prior to each game in the tournament, a draft is held between the opposing team captains to select which heroes their teams use, going back and forth until each side has banned seven and selected five heroes. Once a hero is picked it can no longer be selected by any other player that match, so teams used the draft to strategically plan ahead and deny the opponents' heroes that may be good counters or would be able to take advantage of weaknesses to their current lineup.

== Format ==
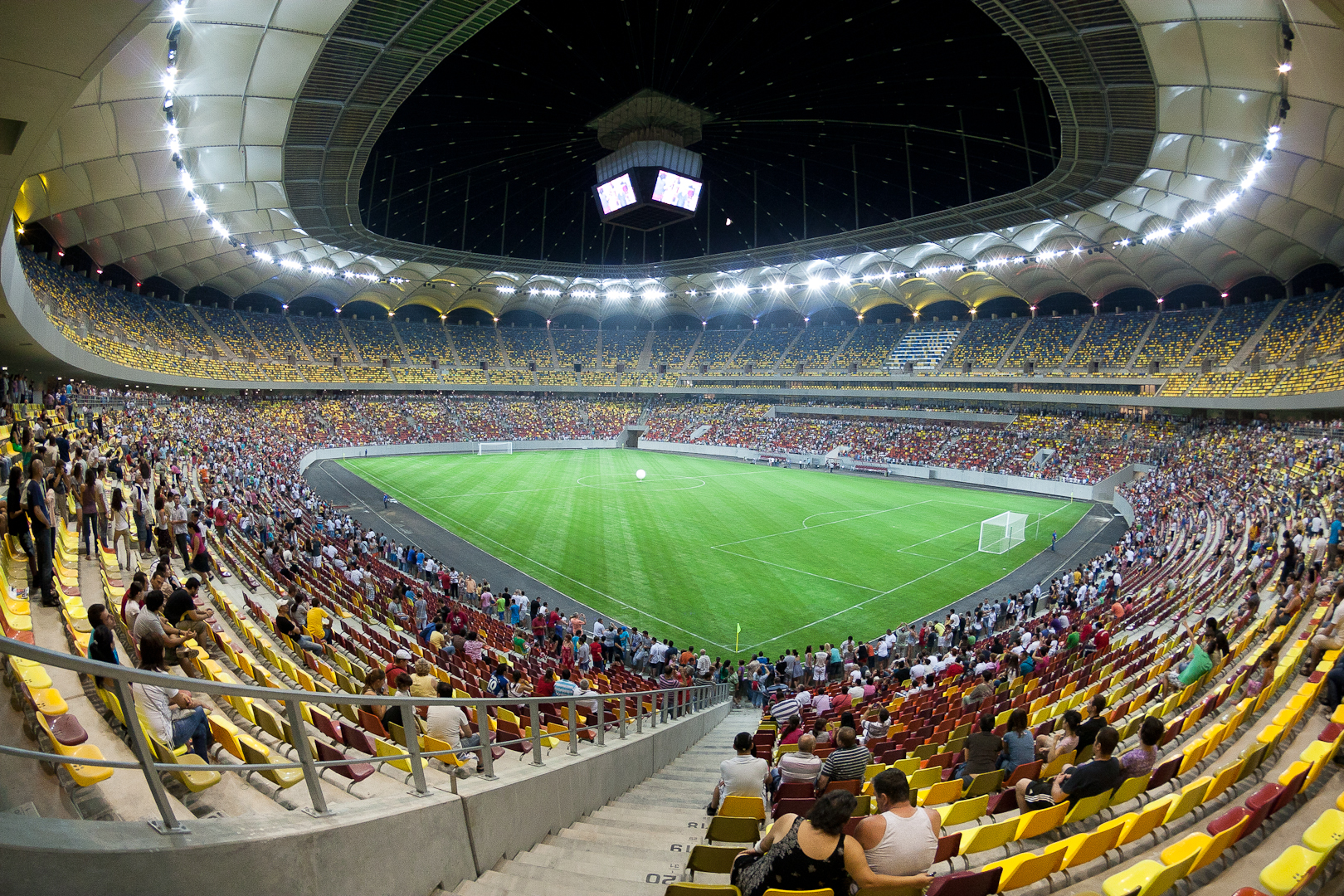
The main event was hosted at the Arena Națională in Bucharest

The event follows the postponement of The International 2020, which was originally set to be held at the Avicii Arena in Stockholm, Sweden, that year before being pushed back indefinitely due to the COVID-19 pandemic. Valve attempted to restart the event there in 2021 before the Swedish Sports Confederation voted to not recognize esports under its body, a move that would deny visas for most attempting to enter the country due to their COVID-19 restrictions at the time. Valve made repeated requests for the Swedish government to intervene before deciding to move the event to Romania. The event was originally scheduled to include a live audience who were required to wear face masks and show proof of COVID-19 vaccination to attend. However, Valve announced a week prior to the event that only teams, production staff, and other essential personnel would be allowed to attend due to rising COVID cases in the region and newly implemented restrictions set by the Bucharest government, with them refunding all ticket sales.

The International 2021 featured a series of pre-qualifying tournaments running throughout the first half of 2021, known as the Dota Pro Circuit (DPC), with the top 12 ranking teams receiving direct invitations. Six more teams received invites following the conclusion of double-elimination tournaments held in June and July 2021 for the China, Eastern Europe, Western Europe, North America, South America, and Southeast Asia regions, bringing the total number of participating teams up to 18. To seed the elimination bracket for the main event, round robin group stages featuring two groups of nine teams were played from October 7–10, 2021. In it, each of the teams played each other within their group in a two-game series. The top four placing teams of each group advanced to the upper bracket of the main event, while fifth through eighth advanced to the lower bracket. The lowest placed team from both groups were eliminated from the competition. The main event is being held at the Arena Națională in Bucharest from October 12–17.

=== Teams ===
Direct invitation (DPC)

- Evil Geniuses
- PSG.LGD
- Virtus.pro
- Quincy Crew
- Invictus Gaming
- T1
- Vici Gaming
- Team Secret
- Team Aster
- Alliance
- Beastcoast
- Thunder Predator

Regional qualifier winners

- China: Elephant
- Eastern Europe: Team Spirit
- Western Europe: OG
- North America: Team Undying
- South America: SG esports
- Southeast Asia: Fnatic

== Results ==
=== Group stage ===
Group A
Pos	Team	W	L	
1	Invictus Gaming	14	2	Advanced to the upper bracket
2	Virtus.pro	11	5	Advanced to the upper bracket
3	OG	10	6	Advanced to the upper bracket
4	T1	10	6	Advanced to the upper bracket
5	Team Undying	9	7	Advanced to the lower bracket
6	Evil Geniuses	9	7	Advanced to the lower bracket
7	Team Aster	5	11	Advanced to the lower bracket
8	Alliance	4	12	Advanced to the lower bracket
9	Thunder Predator	0	16	Eliminated

Group B
Pos	Team	W	L	
1	PSG.LGD	15	1	Advanced to the upper bracket
2	Team Secret	10	6	Advanced to the upper bracket
3	Vici Gaming	10	6	Advanced to the upper bracket
4	Team Spirit	10	6	Advanced to the upper bracket
5	Beastcoast	7	9	Advanced to the lower bracket
6	Quincy Crew	6	10	Advanced to the lower bracket
7	Fnatic	6	10	Advanced to the lower bracket
8	Elephant	6	10	Advanced to the lower bracket
9	SG esports	2	14	Eliminated

=== Main event ===
==== Bracket ====
Upper round 1	Upper round 2	Upper final	Grand Finals
Invictus Gaming	2
Team Spirit	1
Invictus Gaming	0
Team Secret	2
Team Secret	2
OG	0
Team Secret	0
PSG.LGD	2
PSG.LGD	2
T1	1
PSG.LGD	2
Virtus.pro	0
Virtus.pro	2
Vici Gaming	1
PSG.LGD	2
Team Spirit	3
Lower round 1	Lower round 2	Lower round 3	Lower round 4	Lower round 5	Lower final
Team Spirit	2
Virtus.pro	1
Team Undying	0	Fnatic	0
Team Spirit	2	Team Spirit	2
Fnatic	1
OG	0	Team Secret	1
OG	2
Team Spirit	2	Team Spirit	2
Quincy Crew	1	Quincy Crew	0
Invictus Gaming	0
Team Aster	0
T1	2
Invictus Gaming	2
Beastcoast	0	Alliance	0
T1	1	Vici Gaming	0
Alliance	1
Vici Gaming	2
Vici Gaming	2
Evil Geniuses	1	Evil Geniuses	1
Elephant	0

=== Winnings ===
Note: Prizes are in USD

Place	Team	Prize money
1st	Team Spirit	$18,208,300
2nd	PSG.LGD	$5,202,400
3rd	Team Secret	$3,601,600
4th	Invictus Gaming	$2,401,100
5th–6th	Vici Gaming	$1,400,600
5th–6th	Virtus.pro	$1,400,600
7th–8th	OG	$1,000,500
7th–8th	T1	$1,000,500
9th–12th	Alliance	$800,400
9th–12th	Evil Geniuses	$800,400
9th–12th	Fnatic	$800,400
9th–12th	Quincy Crew	$800,400
13th–16th	Beastcoast	$600,300
13th–16th	Elephant	$600,300
13th–16th	Team Aster	$600,300
13th–16th	Team Undying	$600,300
17th–18th	SG esports	$100,000
17th–18th	Thunder Predator	$100,000
