= The International 2022 =

2022 esports tournament

Tournament information
- Game: Dota 2
- Location: Singapore
- Dates: October 15–30, 2022
- Administrator: Valve
- Tournament formats: Group stage; Round robin; Main event; Double elimination
- Venues: Playoffs; Suntec Singapore; Grand Finals; Singapore Indoor Stadium
- Participants: 20 teams
- Purse: US$18,865,624

Final positions
- Champions: Tundra Esports
- 1st runner-up: Team Secret
- 2nd runner-up: Team Liquid

The International 2022 (also known as TI 11 and TI 2022) was the 11th iteration of The International, an annual Dota 2 world championship esports tournament hosted by Valve, the game's developer. The tournament followed the Dota Pro Circuit (DPC), an annual series of tournaments awarding points to teams, with the top 12 earning invitations and a further eight earning them by a series of qualifying playoffs.

The tournament was held in Singapore in October 2022 and was the first International where the main event was hosted at more than one venue, as the playoffs took place at Suntec Singapore followed by the grand finals at Singapore Indoor Stadium. As with every International from 2013 onwards, the prize pool was crowdfunded by the Dota 2 community via its battle pass feature with the total reaching US$19 million, the smallest prize pool for an International since 2015. The finals were held between Team Secret and Tundra Esports, with the latter winning.

== Background ==
Dota 2 is a 2013 multiplayer online battle arena (MOBA) video game developed by Valve. In it, two teams of five players compete by selecting characters known as "heroes", each with a variety of innate skills and abilities, and cooperate together to be the first to destroy the base of the other team, which ends the match. The game is played from a top-down perspective, and the player sees a segment of the game's map near their character as well as mini-map that shows their allies, with any enemies revealed outside the fog of war. The game's map has three roughly symmetric "lanes" between each base, with a number of defensive towers protecting each side. Periodically, the team's base spawns a group of weak CPU-controlled creatures, called "creeps", that march down each of the three lanes towards the opponents' base, fighting any enemy hero, creep, or structure they encounter. If a hero character is killed, that character respawns back at their base after a delay period, which gets progressively longer the farther into the match.

As with previous years of the tournament, a corresponding battle pass for Dota 2 was released in 2022, allowing the prize pool to be crowdfunded by players of the game. Those who purchase the pass both support the tournament and gain access to exclusive in-game rewards. A quarter of all revenue made by it up until November 2, 2022, was added directly towards the prize pool. It finalized at $18.9 million, making it the first International to not surpass the previous one's prize pool and the lowest since The International 2015. At the time of event, Dota 2 featured 123 playable characters, called "heroes". Prior to each game in the tournament, a draft is held between the opposing team captains to select which heroes their teams use, going back and forth until each side has banned seven and selected five heroes. Once a hero is picked it can no longer be selected by any other player that match, so teams used the draft to strategically plan ahead and deny the opponents' heroes that may be good counters or would be able to take advantage of weaknesses to their current lineup.

The International 2022 was the first tournament in the series to see a decrease in prize money compared to last year. This was due to insufficiently large donations from Battle Pass sales. Alexander "JAM" Korotkov and some part of the game's community still consider the decline to be positive or at least inevitable:

I'll put it this way: the fact that prize money went down is normal. And it was bound to happen sooner or later. I understand Valve perfectly well - you make the tournament with the biggest prize pool (before the Riyadh Masters), that's why it was prestigious. You can endlessly release these Battle Passes, throw in billions of lootboxes to pump up that prize pool and so on, but the question is: ‘Why?’. Just to fill your pocket? I don't know, for me personally, on the contrary, it would be better if the prize pool was 10-15 million, and it would be a simple well-done large event, that's all. So that there wouldn't be these overbearing sums, just so every team that made only to the top-16 wouldn't leave with a few hundred thousand dollars. Well, that's crazy, to be honest. For me, at least, it shouldn't work that way.

=== Teams ===
Direct invitation (DPC)

- PSG.LGD
- OG
- Team Spirit
- Beastcoast
- Team Aster
- Thunder Awaken
- Boom Esports
- TSM
- Tundra Esports
- Gaimin Gladiators
- Evil Geniuses
- Fnatic

Regional qualifier winners

- China: Royal Never Give Up
- Eastern Europe: BetBoom Team
- Western Europe: Entity
- North America: Soniqs
- South America: Hokori
- Southeast Asia: Talon Esports

Last chance qualifier winners

- Team Secret
- Team Liquid

== Group stage ==
Group A
Pos	Team	W	L	
1	Evil Geniuses	14	4	Advanced to the upper bracket
2	Team Liquid	13	5	Advanced to the upper bracket
3	PSG.LGD	12	6	Advanced to the upper bracket
4	OG	10	8	Advanced to the upper bracket
5	Hokori	9	9	Advanced to the lower bracket
6	Royal Never Give Up	9	9	Advanced to the lower bracket
7	Gaimin Gladiators	8	10	Advanced to the lower bracket
8	Boom Esports	5	13	Advanced to the lower bracket
9	Soniqs	5	13	Eliminated
10	BetBoom Team	5	13	Eliminated

Group B
Pos	Team	W	L	
1	Tundra Esports	14	4	Advanced to the upper bracket
2	Team Secret	13	5	Advanced to the upper bracket
3	Thunder Awaken	10	8	Advanced to the upper bracket
4	Team Aster	10	8	Advanced to the upper bracket
5	Fnatic	9	9	Advanced to the lower bracket
6	Team Spirit	9	9	Advanced to the lower bracket
7	Beastcoast	8	10	Advanced to the lower bracket
8	Entity	6	12	Advanced to the lower bracket
9	Talon Esports	6	12	Eliminated
10	TSM	5	13	Eliminated

=== Tier breakers ===
Group A
Pos	Team	W	L	
1	Boom Esports	2	0	Advanced to the lower bracket
2	Soniqs	1	1	Eliminated
3	BetBoom Team	0	2	Eliminated

Group B
Pos	Team	W	L	
1	Entity	1	0	Advanced to the lower bracket
2	Talon Esports	0	1	Eliminated

== Main event ==
Upper round 1	Upper round 2	Upper final	Grand Finals
Evil Geniuses	0
Thunder Awaken	2
Thunder Awaken	0
Team Secret	2
Team Secret	2
PSG.LGD	0
Team Secret	1
Tundra Esports	2
Tundra Esports	2
OG	0
Tundra Esports	2
Team Aster	0
Team Aster	2
Team Liquid	0
Tundra Esports	3
Team Secret	0
Lower round 1	Lower round 2	Lower round 3	Lower round 4	Lower round 5	Lower final
Evil Geniuses	0
Team Aster	2
Hokori	0	Beastcoast	2
Beastcoast	1	PSG.LGD	0
Beastcoast	1
PSG.LGD	2	Team Secret	2
PSG.LGD	2
Team Aster	1	Team Liquid	1
Team Spirit	0	Boom Esports	0
Team Liquid	2
Boom Esports	1
OG	2
Thunder Awaken	1
Fnatic	0	Gaimin Gladiators	0
OG	0	Team Liquid	2
Gaimin Gladiators	1
Team Liquid	2
Team Liquid	2
Royal Never Give Up	0	Entity	1
Entity	1

=== Winnings ===
Note: Prizes are in USD

Place	Team	Prize money
1st	Tundra Esports	$8,518,800
2nd	Team Secret	$2,461,000
3rd	Team Liquid	$1,703,800
4th	Team Aster	$1,135,800
5th–6th	PSG.LGD	$662,600
5th–6th	Thunder Awaken	$662,600
7th–8th	Beastcoast	$473,300
7th–8th	OG	$473,300
9th–12th	Evil Geniuses	$378,600
9th–12th	Boom Esports	$378,600
9th–12th	Gaimin Gladiators	$378,600
9th–12th	Entity	$378,600
13th–16th	Hokori	$284,000
13th–16th	Team Spirit	$284,000
13th–16th	Fnatic	$284,000
13th–16th	Royal Never Give Up	$284,000
17th–20th	Soniqs	$47,300
17th–20th	Talon Esports	$47,300
17th–20th	BetBoom Team	$47,300
17th–20th	TSM	$47,300
