= AdmiralBulldog =

Swedish esports player

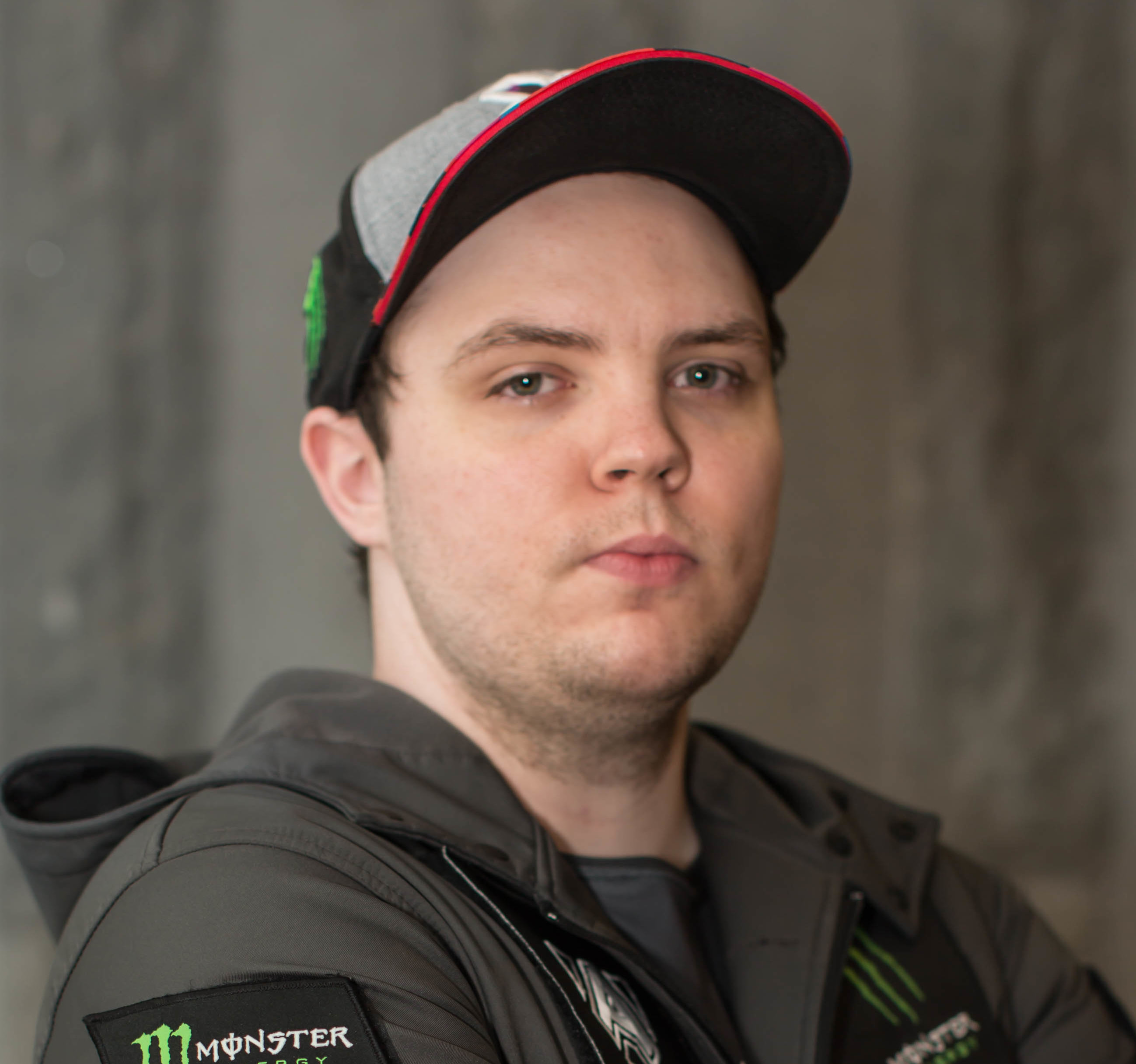

Personal information
- Name: Henrik Ahnberg
- Born: 19 December 1990 (age 35)
- Nationality: Swedish

Career information
- Games: Dota 2
- Playing career: 2012–2016
- Role: Offlaner

Team history
- 2012–2013: No Tidehunter
- 2013–2015: Alliance
- 2015: Team Tinker
- 2015–2016: Alliance

Career highlights and awards
- The International champion (2013)

Twitch information
- Channel: AdmiralBulldog
- Followers: 784 thousand

YouTube information
- Channel: AdmiralBulldog
- Subscribers: 256 thousand
- Views: 364.7 million
- Last updated: 8 February 2025

Henrik Ahnberg (born 19 December 1990), better known as AdmiralBulldog, is a Swedish streamer and former professional Dota 2 player for Alliance, with whom he won The International 2013.

== Professional career ==
Ahnberg debuted with the mainly Swedish team No Tidehunter on 9 November 2012 against Team Empire. Even though they beat Team Empire in a best of 3, Team Empire went on to win the TPL III league.

After beating teams such as Evil Geniuses, Natus Vincere, Fnatic, Team Liquid and winning nine tournaments in less than seven months, team Alliance decide to pick up the roster of No Tidehunter on 12 April 2013.

Immediately after getting sponsored, Alliance won 6 premier tournaments in a row including The International 3. After a disappointing 11th-place finish at The International 4, and another bad 8th-place finish at XMG Captains Draft 2.0, AdmiralBulldog went inactive in the competitive scene and started full-time streaming on Twitch except for one tournament with Team Tinker.

AdmiralBulldog returned to playing for Alliance for I-league season 3, in which they finished in 5th position. In the WCA 2015 Europe Open Qualifiers, Alliance won 1st place and $8,000, the only gold medal since ASUS ROG DreamLeague season 1. The team later went on to win the entire tournament.

On 17 January 2016, Ahnberg won StarLadder i-League StarSeries. As part of the annual post-The International 2016 roster shake-up, Ahnberg left team Alliance.

== Broadcasting career ==
Ahnberg was invited to both The International 2017 and 2018 as an analyst. However, for The International 2017 broadcast, his visa was denied when he arrived to Seattle, where the event was to take place. The visa issues continued for The International 2018 in Vancouver, for which he failed to secure a visa in time for the event.
