= Dota Pro Circuit =

Dota 2 professional league (2017-2023)

- Genre: Dota 2 tournament circuit and league
- Frequency: Annual
- Years active: 2017–2023
- Organizer: Valve
- Website: www.dota2.com/esports

The Dota Pro Circuit (DPC) was the professional league used in Dota 2, a competitive five-on-five video game. Active between 2017 and 2023, the DPC was organized by the game's developer, Valve and consisted of seasonal "Major" tournaments and Regional Leagues from North America, South America, Southeast Asia, China, Eastern Europe, and Western Europe. Points were earned by the top six teams playing in the upper division of a Regional League as well as those finishing in the top eight of a Major. The top 12 teams with the most points at the season's conclusion earned invites to The International, the premier tournament for Dota 2. The DPC was introduced in 2017 as a replacement for the Dota Major Championship series (2015–2016), which was criticized due to Valve's non-transparent process for sending out International invites. The DPC ended following the 2023 season.

== History ==
From late 2015 until early 2017, Valve sponsored a series of smaller-scale, seasonally held tournaments known as the Dota Major Championships. Their format was based on the tournament series of the same name that Valve also sponsored for their first-person shooter game, Counter-Strike: Global Offensive. Including The International 2016 and 2017, which were considered to be the cumulative Major of their respective seasons, the series had five other events, which were the Frankfurt Major, Shanghai Major, Manila Major, Boston Major, and Kiev Major. Following the International 2017, the Majors were replaced with the DPC due to criticism by teams and fans for Valve's non-transparent and unpredictable nature for handing out International invitations.

For the first season (2017–2018), teams' scores were determined by the total score of the top three point-earning players on them, with points being carried over if a player changes teams during the season. A team was allowed to change its roster twice in a specified time period, but would automatically lose its eligibility to obtain a direct invitation if they changed its roster after the second mid-season roster period had passed. The eight teams with the highest point totals at the end of the season received direct invitations to The International 2018, while another ten teams qualified via regional qualifier tournaments. Tournaments within the circuit were categorized as either Majors or Minors and were organized by third-parties. To qualify as a Major, a tournament was required to feature a minimum prize pool of $500,000, include at least one qualifier from each of the six primary regions (North America, South America, Southeast Asia, China, Europe, Commonwealth of Independent States) and culminate in an offline final. Minor tournaments followed the same structural requirements, but with a lower minimum prize pool of $150,000. Valve contributed directly to the prize pool of each event, matching the minimum required amount. Additionally, Valve coordinated the scheduling of tournaments to avoid calendar conflicts. Over the course of the 2017–2018 season, the Dota Pro Circuit comprised nine Majors (excluding The International 2018) and 13 Minors.

Starting with the second season (2018–2019), there were a number of adjustments to the rules, with the primary one being that both Major and Minor events are held in pairs, with qualifiers for each set to run in exclusively scheduled windows, as direct invites to them are now forbidden. In contrast with the previous season, the overall number of them decreased from 22 to 10, with the season beginning in September 2018 and concluding in June 2019. The number of direct International 2019 invites was increased from eight to twelve, with each of the six regions being given a single qualifying slot. The qualifiers for Majors ran first, and teams who failed to qualify for it were eligible to compete in the Minor qualifiers a few days later. The winner of a Minor tournament is granted a reserved slot in the associated Major. Valve also removed roster locks that previously prevented teams that made changes mid-season from qualifying for points for the season. Instead, all points are directly assigned to teams rather than individual players. Removing a player from the roster reduces the team's total points by 20 percent, with adding a replacement player having no penalty. In addition, Valve also implemented a rule that only allows for a single team owned in an multi-team organization to compete in The International and the qualifiers leading up to them. The rule also includes cases in which individual players have financial ties to other teams.

The 2021 DPC season consisted of two legs instead of three, with points from the suspended 2019–2020 season not being used. The Minors were also replaced by Regional Leagues that are six weeks long, in which teams competed for qualifying positions to attend Majors. Instead, the top four teams from each region were selected to qualify for the upper-division, with qualifiers being used to determine the remaining twelve teams in both the upper and lower divisions. In September 2023, Valve announced the 2023 season would be the last, as they believed the DPC had grown too large in the professional scene and wanted to support smaller, grassroots tournaments.

== Format ==
The Dota Pro Circuit originally consisted of three tours that consist of "Major" tournaments and Regional Leagues from North America, South America, Southeast Asia, China, Eastern Europe, and Western Europe. Each Major tournament consists of winners from each Regional League. Points are earned by the top six teams playing in the upper division of a Regional League, as well as the top eight teams of a Major tournament. Earlier tournaments in the season grant teams fewer total points, while the events closer to the International weigh more heavily. The top 12 teams with the most points at the season's conclusion earn invites to that year's International. To avoid conflicting dates, Valve directly manages the scheduling.

A team's roster is locked for the season, with a 15% DPC point penalty occurring for every player change. Teams who make roster changes after qualifying for a Major will also have an additional 20% penalty added for a total of a 35%. Teams can play four of their seven Regional League matches with a substitute, but any team that does so at a Major without special exception will incur a 40% point penalty. A team that plays five or more Regional League matches with a substitute will become disqualified from the season.
