= Boston Major =

Dota 2 tournament

Tournament information
- Sport: Dota 2
- Location: Boston, Massachusetts, United States
- Dates: December 7–10, 2016
- Administrator: Valve
- Tournament format(s): Group stage GSL format Bracket; Single elimination
- Host: PGL
- Venue: Wang Theatre
- Teams: 16
- Purse: US$3,000,000

Final positions
- Champions: OG
- Runner-up: Ad Finem

The Boston Major was a professional Dota 2 esports tournament that took place in Boston in the United States. The main event was played live at the Wang Theatre from December 7–10, 2016. Like other tournaments in the Dota 2 Major Championship series, the event featured 16 teams from around the world and had a $3,000,000 prize pool, with the victor winning $1,000,000. The event was presented and produced by PGL, who also had the same role at the previous Major in Manila.

Unlike previous Dota 2 Majors, the Boston Major was the first one to have a single elimination bracket. The event was won by OG, their third Dota 2 Major championship victory, who defeated Ad Finem in the best-of-five grand finals 3–1.

== Teams ==
Direct invitation

- Wings Gaming
- Digital Chaos
- Evil Geniuses
- Newbee
- EHOME
- LGD Gaming (Note: The Filipino-based team Execration was originally invited, but were not able to attend the tournament in time due to visa complications, and were instead replaced by LGD Gaming)
- OG
- MVP Phoenix

Regional qualifier winners

- Team NP (Americas)
- compLexity Gaming (Americas)
- LGD.Forever Young (China)
- iG Vitality (China)
- Ad Finem (Europe)
- Virtus.pro (Europe)
- Team Faceless (Southeast Asia)
- WarriorsGaming.Unity (Southeast Asia)

== Tournament ==
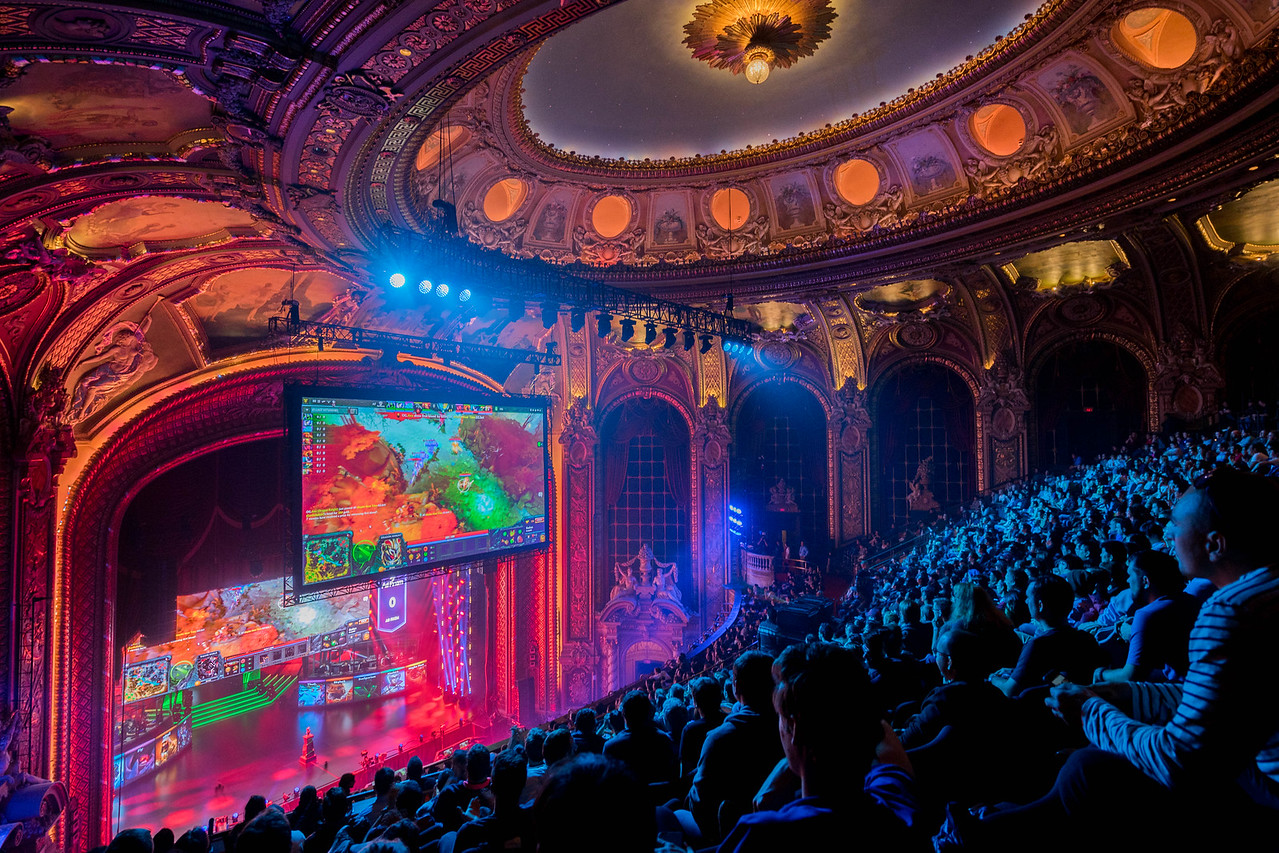
During the grand finals match between Ad Finem and OG

=== Groups ===
==== Group A ====
Pos	Team	Pld	W	L	Pts
1	Digital Chaos	2	2	0	2
2	Wings Gaming	3	2	1	2
3	WarriorsGaming.Unity	3	1	2	1
4	LGD.Forever Young	2	0	2	0

Updated to match(es) played on December 3. Source:

==== Group B ====
Pos	Team	Pld	W	L	Pts
1	Virtus.pro	2	2	0	2
2	Newbee	3	2	1	2
3	Team NP	3	1	2	1
4	MVP Phoenix	2	0	2	0

Updated to match(es) played on December 3. Source:

==== Group C ====
Pos	Team	Pld	W	L	Pts
1	LGD Gaming	2	2	0	2
2	compLexity Gaming	3	2	1	2
3	Evil Geniuses	3	1	2	1
4	Team Faceless	2	0	2	0

Updated to match(es) played on December 4. Source:

==== Group D ====
Pos	Team	Pld	W	L	Pts
1	OG	2	2	0	2
2	EHOME	3	2	1	2
3	Ad Finem	3	1	2	1
4	iG Vitality	2	0	2	0

Updated to match(es) played on December 4. Source:

=== Bracket ===
All series were played to a best-of-three, with the exception being the best-of-five grand finals.

First round
B1	Virtus.pro	2
D4	iG.Vitality	0
C3	Evil Geniuses	2
A2	Wings Gaming	0
C2	compLexity Gaming	0
A3	WarriorsGaming.Unity	2
D1	OG	2
B4	MVP Phoenix	0
A1	Digital Chaos	2
C4	Team Faceless	0
D2	EHOME	1
B3	Team NP	2
D3	Ad Finem	2
B2	Newbee	1
C1	LGD Gaming	0
A4	LGD.Forever Young	2

Quarterfinals
Virtus.pro	0
Evil Geniuses	2
WarriorsGaming.Unity	1
OG	2
Digital Chaos	2
Team NP	0
Ad Finem	2
LGD.Forever Young	1

Semifinals
Evil Geniuses	0
OG	2
Digital Chaos	0
Ad Finem	2

Finals
OG	3
Ad Finem	1

== Results ==
(Note: Prizes are in USD)

Place	Team	Prize money
1st	OG	$1,000,000
2nd	Ad Finem	$500,000
3rd/4th	Digital Chaos	$250,000
3rd/4th	Evil Geniuses	$250,000
5th–8th	LGD.Forever Young	$125,000
5th–8th	Team NP	$125,000
5th–8th	Virtus.pro	$125,000
5th–8th	WarriorsGaming.Unity	$125,000
9th–16th	compLexity Gaming	$62,500
9th–16th	EHOME	$62,500
9th–16th	iG Vitality	$62,500
9th–16th	LGD Gaming	$62,500
9th–16th	MVP Phoenix	$62,500
9th–16th	Newbee	$62,500
9th–16th	Team Faceless	$62,500
9th–16th	Wings Gaming	$62,500
