= Kiev Major =

Dota 2 tournament

Kyiv Major

Tournament information
- Sport: Dota 2
- Location: Kyiv, Ukraine
- Dates: April 27–30, 2017
- Administrator: Valve
- Tournament format(s): Group stage Swiss format Bracket; Single elimination
- Host(s): PGL
- Venue(s): National Palace of Arts
- Teams: 16
- Purse: US$3,000,000

Final positions
- Champions: OG
- Runner-up: Virtus.pro

The Kiev Major was a professional Dota 2 esport tournament that was held in April 2017 at the National Palace of Arts in Kyiv, Ukraine. The tournament featured eight directly invited teams, as well as eight qualified teams from six different worldwide regions.

The open qualifiers tournament was held on March 6–9, 2017, followed by the regional qualifiers held on March 10–13, 2017. For the first time in an officially sponsored tournament, Valve, the game's developer and tournament administrator, split the previously single Americas region into North and South America, as well as creating the CIS region out of Europe. The event had a $3 million prize pool, with the winning team taking $1 million. The best-of-five grand finals took place between OG and Virtus.pro, with OG taking the series 3–2, winning them their fourth Dota 2 Major championship.

== Teams ==
Direct invitation

- Evil Geniuses
- Mousesports (Note: Originally invited as Greek-based Ad Finem, the players left the organization in March 2017, with German-based Mousesports signing them the following month.)
- Newbee
- OG
- Team Liquid
- Team Random (Note: Invited as Wings Gaming, the original roster left the organization before the event, reforming as Team Random)
- Thunderbirds (Note: Invited as Digital Chaos, the original roster left the organization before the event, with the original Digital Chaos roster reforming as Thunderbirds and the Team Onyx roster and staff joining Digital Chaos. Valve tournament rules allow for replaced teams to remain in the tournament, as long as the rosters on the new team remained the same.)
- VGJ

Regional qualifier winners

- Digital Chaos (North America)
- iG Vitality (China)
- Invictus Gaming (China)
- SG e-sports (South America)
- Team Faceless (Southeast Asia)
- Team Secret (Europe)
- TNC Pro Team (Southeast Asia)
- Virtus.pro (CIS)

== Bracket ==
All series were played to a best-of-three, with the exception being the best-of-five grand finals.

First round
Invictus Gaming	2
Mousesports	1
Team Liquid	2
Newbee	1
Digital Chaos	0
VGJ	2
Virtus.pro	2
iG Vitality	0
TNC Pro Team	1
Team Faceless	2
OG	2
Team Random	1
Thunderbirds	0
Evil Geniuses	2
Team Secret	1
SG e-sports	2

Quarterfinals
Invictus Gaming	2
Team Liquid	1
VGJ	1
Virtus.pro	2
Team Faceless	1
OG	2
Evil Geniuses	2
SG e-sports	1

Semifinals
Invictus Gaming	0
Virtus.pro	2
OG	2
Evil Geniuses	0

Finals
Virtus.pro	2
OG	3

== Results ==
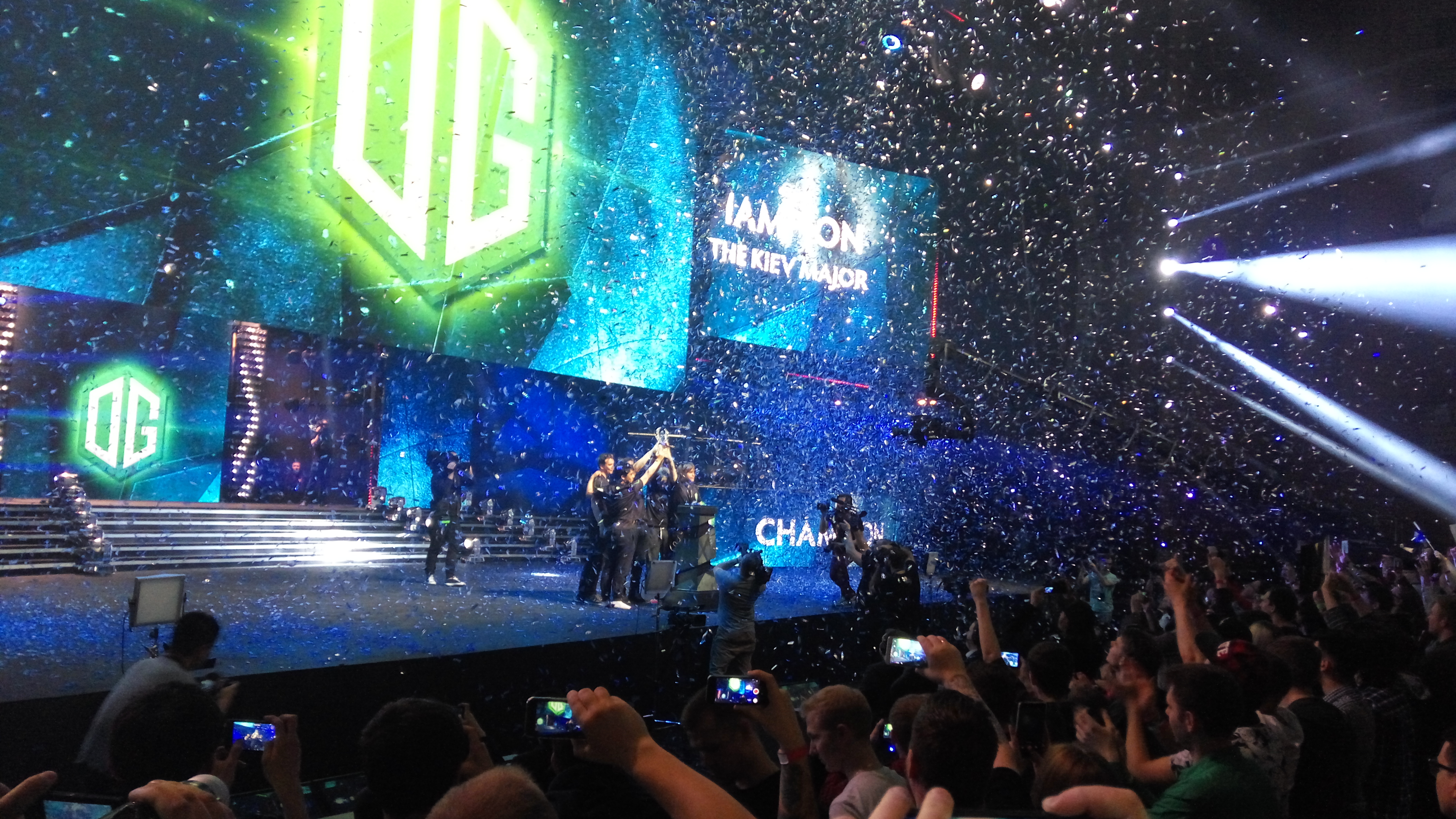
European-based team OG after their game five win in the grand finals

(Note: Prizes are in USD)

Place	Team	Prize money
1st	OG	$1,000,000
2nd	Virtus.pro	$500,000
3rd/4th	Evil Geniuses	$250,000
3rd/4th	Invictus Gaming	$250,000
5th–8th	SG e-sports	$125,000
5th–8th	Team Faceless	$125,000
5th–8th	Team Liquid	$125,000
5th–8th	VGJ	$125,000
9th–16th	Digital Chaos	$62,500
9th–16th	iG Vitality	$62,500
9th–16th	Mousesports	$62,500
9th–16th	Newbee	$62,500
9th–16th	Team Random	$62,500
9th–16th	Team Secret	$62,500
9th–16th	Thunderbirds	$62,500
9th–16th	TNC Pro Team	$62,500
