= Manila Major =

2016 Dota 2 tournament

Tournament information
- Sport: Dota 2
- Location: Manila, Philippines
- Dates: June 7–12
- Administrator: Valve
- Tournament format(s): Group stage Round robin Bracket; Double elimination
- Host: PGL
- Venue: Mall of Asia Arena
- Teams: 16
- Purse: US$3,000,000

Final positions
- Champions: OG
- 1st runner-up: Team Liquid
- 2nd runner-up: Newbee

The Manila Major, also known as the Spring Major, was a professional Dota 2 esport tournament that took place in Manila, Philippines. The main event was held at the Mall of Asia Arena from June 7–12, 2016.

== Participating teams ==
Direct invitation

- Evil Geniuses
- OG
- Team Secret
- Team Liquid
- Alliance
- Natus Vincere
- Araburat Gaming
- LGD Gaming
- Vici Gaming
- Fnatic
- MVP Phoenix
- compLexity Gaming

Regional qualifiers

- Digital Chaos (Americas)
- Newbee (China)
- Team Empire (Europe)
- Mineski (Southeast Asia)

== Results ==
=== Group stage ===
Group A
Pos	Team	Pld	W	L	
1	Newbee	2	2	0	Advanced to the upper bracket
2	OG	3	2	1	Advanced to the upper bracket
3	Team Empire	3	1	2	Advanced to the lower bracket
4	Complexity Gaming	2	0	2	Advanced to the lower bracket

Group B
Pos	Team	Pld	W	L	
1	Natus Vincere	2	2	0	Advanced to the upper bracket
2	Digital Chaos	3	2	1	Advanced to the upper bracket
3	Wings Gaming	3	1	2	Advanced to the lower bracket
4	Team Secret	2	0	2	Advanced to the lower bracket

Group C
Pos	Team	Pld	W	L	
1	Team Liquid	2	2	0	Advanced to the upper bracket
2	Fnatic	3	2	1	Advanced to the upper bracket
3	Alliance	3	1	2	Advanced to the lower bracket
4	Vici Gaming Reborn	2	0	2	Advanced to the lower bracket

Group D
Pos	Team	Pld	W	L	
1	LGD Gaming	2	2	0	Advanced to the upper bracket
2	MVP Phoenix	3	2	1	Advanced to the upper bracket
3	Evil Geniuses	3	1	2	Advanced to the lower bracket
4	Mineski	2	0	2	Advanced to the lower bracket

=== Main Event ===
Quarterfinals (Bo3)	Semifinals (Bo3)	Upper bracket finals (Bo3)	Grand finals (Bo5)
Team Liquid	0
MVP Phoenix	2
MVP Phoenix	0
OG	2
Natus Vincere	0
OG	2
OG	2
Newbee	1
Newbee	2
Digital Chaos	1
Newbee	2
Fnatic	0
LGD Gaming	1
Fnatic	2
OG	3
Team Liquid	1
Lower round 1 (Bo1)	Lower round 2 (Bo3)	Lower round 3 (Bo3)	Lower round 4 (Bo3)	Lower round 5 (Bo3)	Lower bracket finals (Bo3)
Team Liquid	2
Fnatic	0
Wings Gaming	0	compLexity Gaming	0
Team Liquid	2	Team Liquid	2
compLexity Gaming	1
Natus Vincere	0	Newbee	1
Natus Vincere	2
Team Liquid	2	Team Liquid	2
Alliance	1	Alliance	1
LGD Gaming	0
Mineski	0
Digital Chaos	1
MVP Phoenix	1
Evil Geniuses	0	Vici Gaming Reborn	2
Vici Gaming Reborn	1	LGD Gaming	2
Vici Gaming Reborn	1
LGD Gaming	2
LGD Gaming	2
Team Empire	1	Team Empire	0
Team Secret	0

=== Winnings ===
(Note: Prizes are in USD)

Place	Team	Prize Money
1st	OG	$1,110,000
2nd	Team Liquid	$405,000
3rd	Newbee	$315,000
4th	LGD Gaming	$255,000
5th–6th	Fnatic	$202,500
5th–6th	MVP Phoenix	$202,500
7th–8th	Natus Vincere	$105,000
7th–8th	Vici Gaming Reborn	$105,000
9th–12th	compLexity Gaming	$45,000
9th–12th	Alliance	$45,000
9th–12th	Digital Chaos	$45,000
9th–12th	Team Empire	$45,000
13th–16th	Wings Gaming	$30,000
13th–16th	Mineski	$30,000
13th–16th	Evil Geniuses	$30,000
13th–16th	Team Secret	$30,000
