= Dota =

Video game series

- Genres: ARTS; strategy
- Developer: Valve
- Publisher: Valve
- Creator: Eul
- Platforms: Windows; macOS; Linux; Android; iOS
- First release: Defense of the Ancients; 2003
- Latest release: Dota Underlords; February 25, 2020

Dota is a series of strategy video games. The series began in 2003 with the release of Defense of the Ancients (DotA), a fan-developed action real time strategy (ARTS) custom map for the video game Warcraft III: Reign of Chaos and its expansion, The Frozen Throne. The original map features gameplay designed around two teams of up to five players who assume control of individual characters called "heroes", which must coordinate to destroy the enemy's central base structure called an "Ancient", to win the game. Ownership and development of DotA were passed on multiple times since its initial release until Valve hired the map's lead designer IceFrog and after a legal dispute with Blizzard Entertainment, the developer of Warcraft III, brokered a deal that allowed Valve to inherit the trademark to the Dota name.

The first standalone installment in the series, Dota 2, was released by Valve in July 2013. A sequel to DotA, the game retains the same gameplay elements as its predecessor, while introducing new support and mechanics, as well as a setting separate from the Warcraft universe. Artifact, a digital collectible card game with mechanics inspired by Dota 2, was released in 2018. Dota Underlords, an auto battler based on the community-created Dota 2 mod Dota Auto Chess, was released in 2020.

The original DotA map is considered one of the most popular of all time, with tens of millions of players and a consistent presence at esports tournaments throughout the 2000s. DotA is considered a catalyst for the ARTS genre, establishing core gameplay mechanics that defined later titles and inspiring developers to create other games similar to it. Likewise, Dota 2 is cited as one of the greatest video games of all time, with an esports presence hallmarked by record-breaking prize pools that culminate in the annual championship known as The International. The spinoff games by Valve have been positively received, although Artifact was considered a failure as a large majority of its initial player base was lost within weeks with Valve stopping development on it shortly after its release.

== Games ==
The Dota series includes four games that are centered around competitive, online multiplayer gameplay. The original version, Defense of the Ancients, is a community-created Warcraft III custom map developed with the Warcraft III World Editor that was first released in 2003. The franchise name, "Dota", is derived from the original map's acronym, DotA. Dota 2, its standalone installment, was released as a free-to-play sequel in July 2013. The first spin-off, a digital collectible card game called Artifact, was released in November 2018. The second spin-off, an auto battler called Dota Underlords, was released in February 2020.

The main installments in the series are action real time strategy games, where the player assumes control over a single character - a "hero" - from a large roster of characters and coordinates with their teammates to destroy their opponents' large structure called an Ancient, while defending their own. Unlike the original version, which is largely derived from the setting of the Warcraft series, the standalone games share their own continuity. Likewise, the standalone games utilize the Source game engine and Steam distribution platform - both developed by Valve.

=== Defense of the Ancients (DotA) ===
The installment which established the Dota intellectual property was the Warcraft III: Reign of Chaos custom map Defense of the Ancients (DotA). Independently developed and released by the pseudonymous designer Eul in 2003, it was inspired by Aeon of Strife, a multiplayer StarCraft map. Before every DotA match, up to ten players are organized into two teams called the Scourge and the Sentinel—inspired by the factions from Warcraft lore—with the former in the northeast corner and the latter in the southwest corner of a nearly-symmetrical map. Using one of several game modes, the players each choose a single powerful unit called a "hero", who they are granted control of throughout the match. Heroes maintain special tactical advantages, in the way of their statistics, attack, and damage types, as well as abilities that can be learned and enhanced through leveling up from combat. Team coordination and roster composition are considered crucial for a successful match. The currency of the game is gold, which may be used for purchasing items that may enhance a hero's statistics and provide special abilities. Gold is awarded to players for destroying enemies and in increments on a rolling basis, while also being deducted for the death of one's hero. Heroes battle alongside weaker computer-controlled infantry units periodically dispatched in waves, who traverse three paths called "lanes", which connect the Scourge and Sentinel bases. Each lane is lined with defensive towers, which are not only more powerful the closer they are to their respective bases, but invulnerable until their predecessors are destroyed. At the center of each base is a central structure called an "Ancient", which is either the World Tree for the Sentinel or the Frozen Throne for the Scourge. To win a match, the enemy's Ancient must be destroyed.

=== Dota 2 ===
Valve's interest in the Dota intellectual property began when several veteran employees, including Team Fortress 2 designer Robin Walker and executive Erik Johnson, became fans of the map and wanted to build a modern sequel. The company corresponded with IceFrog by email about his long-term plans for the project, and he was subsequently hired to direct a sequel. IceFrog first announced his new position through his blog in October 2009, with Dota 2 being officially announced a year later. Shortly after, Valve filed a trademark claim for the Dota name. At Gamescom 2011, company president Gabe Newell explained that the trademark was needed to develop a sequel with the already-identifiable brand. Holding the Dota name to be a community asset, Feak and Mescon filed an opposing trademark for Dota on behalf of DotA-Allstars, LLC (then a subsidiary of Riot Games) in August 2010. Rob Pardo, the executive vice president of Blizzard Entertainment at the time, similarly stated that the Dota name belonged to the mod's community. Blizzard acquired DotA-Allstars, LLC from Riot Games and filed an opposition against Valve in November 2011, citing Blizzard's ownership of both the Warcraft III World Editor and DotA-Allstars, LLC as proper claims to the franchise name. The dispute was settled in May 2012, with Valve retaining commercial rights to the Dota trademark, while allowing non-commercial use of the name by third-parties.

An early goal of the Dota 2 team was the adaptation of Defense of the Ancients's aesthetic style for the Source engine. The Radiant and Dire factions replaced the Sentinel and Scourge from the map, respectively. Character names, abilities, items, and map design from the map were largely retained, with some changes due to trademarks owned by Blizzard. In the first Q&A session regarding Dota 2, IceFrog explained that the game would build upon the map without making significant changes to its core. Valve contracted major contributors from the Defense of the Ancients community, including Eul and artist Kendrick Lim, to assist with the sequel. Following nearly two years of beta testing, Dota 2 was officially released on Steam for Windows on July 9, 2013, and for OS X and Linux on July 18, 2013. The game did not launch with every hero from Defense of the Ancients. Instead, the missing ones were added in various post-release updates, with the final one, as well as the first Dota 2 original hero, being added in 2016. Since its release, Dota 2 has been cited as one of the greatest video games of all time. It is also the most lucrative esports game of all time, earning teams and players a total of over US$100 million by June 2017.

=== Artifact ===
Artifact is a digital collectible card game based on Dota 2, developed and published by Valve. The game focuses on online player versus player battles across three boards called lanes. Development began in late 2014, with lead designer Richard Garfield being brought in to help make a digital card game due to his experience with creating the Magic: The Gathering franchise. The game was then announced via a teaser trailer played at The International 2017, a large Dota 2-specific esports tournament organized by Valve. Artifact was released for Windows, macOS, and Linux in November 2018, with versions planned for Android and iOS. While its gameplay and drafting mechanics received praise, it was criticized for its high learning curve and monetization model, which some likened to being pay-to-win. The game saw a 95% decline in players within two months of its release, and had fewer than 100 concurrent players by mid-2019.

=== Dota Underlords ===
Dota Underlords is a free-to-play auto battler, a type of chess-like competitive multiplayer strategy video game, developed and published by Valve. The game is based on a Dota 2 community-created game mode called Dota Auto Chess, with journalists noting the parallel modding origins that DotA had from Warcraft III. It was released in early access in June 2019 for Android, iOS, macOS, Windows, and Linux, with it planned to be officially released in February 2020. One of the many auto battler games that released following the popularity of Dota Auto Chess, critics considered it one of the easiest to get into for newer players of the genre. In Dota Underlords, where players place characters, known as heroes, on an 8x8 grid-shaped battlefield. After a preparation phase, a team's heroes then automatically fight the opposing team without any further direct input from the player. A match features up to eight players online who take turns playing against each other in a one-on-one format, with the winner being the final player standing after eliminating all of the opposing players.

== Other media ==
An anime television series based on the franchise, Dota: Dragon's Blood, premiered on Netflix in March 2021. It is produced by Studio Mir and Kaiju Boulevard.

Swedish electronic music artist Basshunter released "Vi sitter i Ventrilo och spelar DotA" in 2006. The lyrics, in Swedish, are about using the voice chat program Ventrilo while playing Defense of the Ancients.

== IceFrog ==
IceFrog (born 1983 or 1984) is the pseudonymous lead designer of Defense of the Ancients and Dota 2. His involvement with the series began in 2005, when he inherited the reins of DotA Allstars from "Neichus", who himself inherited it from Steve "Guinsoo" Feak. IceFrog is also noted for his anonymity, having never publicly disclosed his identity. In February 2009, IceFrog revealed on his blog that he was 25 years old at the time.

In 2010, an anonymous person who claimed to be a Valve employee wrote a blog post titled "The Truth About IceFrog", in which he claimed that IceFrog had previously worked secretly on Heroes of Newerth for S2 Games before joining Valve in 2009, as well as stating his identity as Abdul Ismail. A court document regarding the ownership of the Dota intellectual property from April 2017 confirmed Ismail as the identity of IceFrog, as well as his pre-Valve contributions in Heroes of Newerth.
