= Dota Underlords =

2020 video game

- Developer: Valve
- Publisher: Valve
- Series: Dota
- Engine: Source 2
- Platforms: Android; iOS; macOS; Linux; Windows
- Release: February 25, 2020
- Genre: Auto battler
- Modes: Single-player, multiplayer

Dota Underlords is a 2020 auto battler game by Valve. The game is based on a popular Dota 2 community-created game mode called Dota Auto Chess, which was released in January 2019. Dota Underlords first released in early access in June 2019 before officially releasing on February 25, 2020, for Android, iOS, macOS, Linux, and Windows. The game is free to play and features cross-platform play.

== Gameplay ==
Heroes automatically fighting on the battlefield grid, with player's inventory below

Dota Underlords is an auto battler, a chess-inspired competitive strategy game, where players place characters, known as heroes, on an 8x8 grid-shaped battlefield. After a preparation phase, when the position of heroes can be changed and new ones can be placed, team's heroes then automatically fight the opposing team without any further direct input from the player. Over the course of a match, players earn gold that can be used to buy new heroes or experience points, that increases the maximum number of heroes that can be placed on the battlefield. When heroes are bought but are not placed on the grid, they are stored in player's inventory; if the player collects three identical heroes, they will combine into a single, stronger version with new unique abilities. Each hero also has a certain combination of 'alliances' - collecting two or more heroes of the same alliance will give a certain bonus to all its members.

Players also make use of items, given after certain number of rounds played, that can be assigned to chosen heroes to increase their power or add a special effect. After round 10, players are offered to choose between 4 different 'Lords', that act as an additional power on the battlefield.

Aside from the classical game mode, "Duos" and "Knockout" modes also exist. Knockout functions as a quick game mode with faster development, while Duos allows playing in a pair of two players, where both share same points of health and experience.

A match features up to eight players online who take turns playing against each other in a one-on-one format, with the winner being the final player standing after eliminating all of the opposing heroes. In classical mode, players start with 100 health, that will decrease after each lost battle, corresponding to the number of survived enemy heroes. Players can play both online matchmaking and single-player matches against bots.

== Development and release ==
Dota Underlords was developed and published by Valve for Android, iOS, macOS, Linux, and Windows. It is based on Dota Auto Chess, a popular community created game mode within Dota 2, a game they also developed. Following Dota Auto Chess's release in January 2019, it quickly became a phenomenon, having over seven million players by April 2019, Valve had met with the mod's developers, the Chinese-based Drodo Studio, to discuss directly collaborating on a standalone version. However, the two companies were unable to come to an agreement, with them both stating that it was in their best interest to develop their own separate games, with Dota Underlords being Valve's project. The game was built using Valve's Source 2 game engine, making it the first game using that engine to be released on mobile platforms.

Valve announced Dota Underlords in May 2019, with it releasing in early access as a free-to-play game on June 20, 2019. where it saw over 1.5 million downloads and held a concurrent player count on Steam of over 200,000 within a few days. Features such as a replay system, ranked matchmaking, daily challenges and rewards, and a battle pass were added over time during its early access phase before it officially released on February 25, 2020. It features full cross-platform play between its PC and mobile versions, with players able to freely start games on one and finish it on another.

== Reception ==
Reception

Review score
Publication	Score
GameSpot	9/10

Polygon called Dota Underlords a clone of Dota Auto Chess, stating that while they thought Underlords was more appealing to new players, the many similarities to the original mod could make it hard for veterans of the genre to see a reason to play Underlords over it. Critics also compared and contrasted it with Artifact, another Valve-developed Dota spinoff game released around the same time that was seen as unsuccessful, as well as Teamfight Tactics, the League of Legends take on the genre. IGN considered Underlords to be the easiest auto battler to get into as a novice due in part to its user interface.
