= Dota Auto Chess =

2019 video game

- Developer: Drodo Studio
- Platforms: Linux; OS X; Windows
- Release: January 4, 2019
- Genre: Auto battler
- Mode: Multiplayer

Dota Auto Chess is a strategy video game mod for the video game Dota 2. Developed by Drodo Studio and released in January 2019, the game features teams of automated Dota 2 heroes fighting battles on a chessboard.

The mod had over eight million players by May 2019 and its popularity led to the rapid creation of the auto battler genre. Later in 2019, Drodo Studio developed a standalone version known simply as Auto Chess, while Valve, the developer of Dota 2, developed their own standalone version known as Dota Underlords.

== Gameplay ==
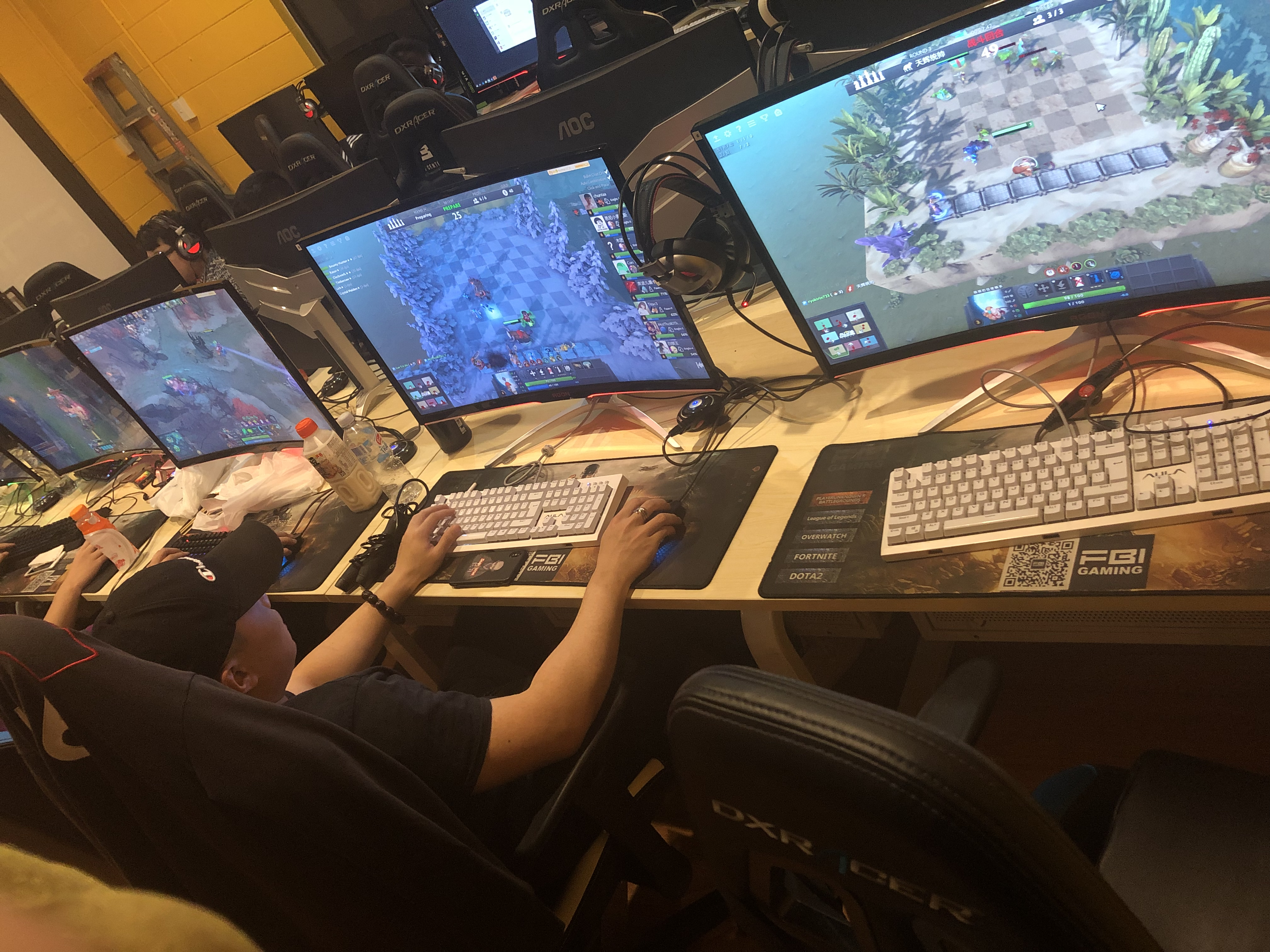
Dota Auto Chess being played at an internet café

This elimination style game features elements derived from Dota 2. Up to eight players are assigned to their own chessboard upon which their "home" battles are fought. Each player controls a character called a courier, which tracks the player's health, gold (displayed as the courier's mana), and experience level. At the beginning of every round, an enemy team appears on the player's board (home games) and the player's team appears on an enemy's board (away games). The teams fight in an automatically generated battle over which the player has no direct control, hence Auto.

Players create a team of pieces which are randomly drawn and purchased from a shared pool of over fifty distinct Dota 2 heroes, each with its own statistics, abilities, and persona. Three of the same piece combine to form a 2-star piece, and three 2-star pieces combine to form a 3-star piece. Each piece also belongs to a class and at least one particular race. Assembling a sufficient number of pieces in a race or class grants a "synergy" which increases the power of either a certain group of pieces or a player's entire team. Each synergy has multiple tiers of increasingly powerful buffs based on how many of each race or class are on a player's board. Synergy buffs may increase the defending team's stats, decrease the opponent team's defenses, or initiate synergy-specific abilities. Because the pool of pieces is shared by all players, synergies which are contested by multiple players are more difficult to assemble. Up to 8 unused pieces can be held on a player's bench.

Gameplay proceeds over the course of several dozen rounds with each round containing three phases: income, preparation, and battle. Income is rewarded at the beginning of each round based on a few different factors. On top of a base amount, players receive one gold in interest per multiple of ten gold (up to forty) currently in their bank. Winning and losing streaks of five or above grant bonus gold. When a player ends another player's win streak by winning an away game against said winning player, they receive extra gold. When a player is knocked out of the game, players that have contributed to their elimination receive gold and/or items. Players also earn one gold immediately upon winning a battle- notably before the next round's interest is calculated.

During the preparation phase, players can spend their gold to buy pieces, to buy experience, or to re-roll the options in their shop. They can also adjust their team- placing and rearranging pieces within the first four rows of their board, selling them, or moving them to the bench. As a player gains additional levels over time or by spending gold on experience, more powerful pieces become available to be rolled and purchased.

The battle phase is straightforward, as players have no control over any of their pieces on their board during this time. Pieces follow basic algorithms to fight and to use their abilities until only one team is left standing. The winning player deals damage to the losing player based on the surviving pieces in the winner's army. During battles, players observe their matches and others in order to determine tactical adjustments to positioning, to identify threats, and to scout for conflicting piece or team compositions.

During mob rounds, players may acquire items after killing neutral creeps and can give these items to their pieces. Each item has unique effects and some can be combined to form stronger versions. Upon a successful fight during every tenth round, the creeps drop a relic. Relics reward players with "neutral items" that manipulate the normal game rules in their favor.

=== Rankings ===
Dota Auto Chess has its own ranking system. After the end of a game, the rank of players changes based on how well they placed. Players who survive longer place higher and thus earn greater rank increases. There are six basic ranks in the game: Queen, King, Rook, Bishop, Knight and Pawn, with Queen the highest rank. The Pawn, Knight, Bishop and Rook ranks are split into numerical rankings from 1 to 9, while there is a single King and single Queen rank. Additionally, the top ten thousand Queen players on the global leaderboard are shown alongside their standing. At the end of April 2019, the developer added a season system. After the end of a season, higher rank players achieve better rewards and the rank will reset.

=== Cosmetics ===
All players have a basic courier at the beginning. After each game, players in the top rank are awarded "candies". Each player can achieve no more than ten candies per day. Players with Custom Pass can achieve five more candies per day. Players can spend 40 candies to roll a new courier or spend hundreds of candies to add a cosmetic effect on their couriers. Couriers have different rarities. The rare couriers are usually bigger and more appealing than normal ones. Some couriers can combine to form new couriers that cannot be bought directly. Beside earning candies in game, players can pay for candies.

In January 2019, players could scan QR codes in the game to pay for candies from a third party store. Drodo Studio later disabled candy codes, but candies are still available from some third party sellers out of the game.

== Development ==
When asked about the inspiration of Dota Auto Chess shortly following the mod's release, Drodo Studio stated that they drew inspiration from the Chinese tile-based game Mahjong for reference. Generally played by four people, the objective of Mahjong is to spell out a particular combination of cards through a series of replacement and trade-off rules while preventing opponents from achieving their own combinations. The game focuses on technique, strategy and calculation, but also relies on luck. While drawing inspiration from Mahjong, Dota Auto Chess made changes to accommodate the battle-oriented gameplay. The game also drew inspiration from a popular mod for WarCraft III called Pokemon Defense.

Dota Auto Chess was released by Drodo Studio to the Steam Marketplace on January 4, 2019. Since its release, Drodo Studio has updated the game with game balance adjustments, bug fixes and new content updates. The content updates include adding and removing pieces, as well as adding new synergies to the game. With the viral surge of popularity of the mod, Valve, the developer of Dota 2, flew Drodo Studio to their headquarters, to discuss recruiting them for developing a standalone version of Dota Auto Chess.

Valve and Drodo Studio concluded that they could not work together directly, though they agreed that would build separate standalone adaptations of the game and would support one another (see Dota Underlords). On June 1, 2019, Valve updated a monthly paid 'Auto Chess Pass' in the Dota 2 store, with a share of the revenue going to Drodo Studio.

== Standalone game ==
Auto Chess
- Developer: Drodo Studio
- Publisher: Drodo Studio
- Platforms: Android; iOS; Windows; PlayStation 4
- Release: Android; April 18, 2019; iOS; May 22, 2019; Windows; July 19, 2019; PlayStation 4; December 16, 2020
- Genre: Auto battler
- Mode: Multiplayer

A standalone Auto Chess by Drodo Studio was released on Android on April 18, 2019, on iOS on May 22, 2019, and on Windows via the Epic Games Store on July 19, 2019, and for PlayStation 4 on December 16, 2020. Drodo Studio stated that besides the development of Auto Chess, they would continue to upgrade Dota Auto Chess. Auto Chess was later published by Dragonest.

== Reception ==
The game had over 8.5 million subscribers by May 2019, with more than 300,000 active players daily. A tournament was held in early March 2019. Several publications praised Dota Auto Chess for its creative gameplay rules accessibility. VPEsports noted that Dota Auto Chess feels like a very strategic game: "It's a strategy game, with a feeling of a turn-based game, it has the key ingredients of card games and it requires the player to plan ahead while being rather good with APM."

Game Informer offered the praise that "It's not chess, and it's not Dota, but it's a great game to queue up and play with friends or solo." "It takes a few games to start to understand how everything works, but its got some really fun strategy hooks underneath everything." PCGamesN called Dota Auto Chess "the most successful third party Dota custom game ever".

Dota Auto Chess is often compared favorably with Valve's digital collectible card game, Artifact, with a number of publications stating that despite the two titles being released in close proximity, Dota Auto Chess has proven to be the more enduring game.

Several publications pointed out there was still room for improvement of the game. VP Esports noted that some bugs in the games needed to be fixed. VentureBeat tested the Drodo Auto Chess mobile game and noted that players who hadn't played Dota Auto Chess on PC might feel confused when figuring out the information of the unit on the field, saying "Drodo's mobile Auto Chess is a significantly better way to play the original great mod if you already know and comprehend the original game, and for that, it should be a success. But it feels like a perhaps smaller-scale version of Auto Chess, one designed around the small screen both visually and as a game, might be the one to take over the world like previous mods have."

The popularity of Dota Auto Chess quickly inspired a host of games, creating the auto battler subgenre. In China, there was a reported eight companies having registered the "Auto Chess" trademark in January 2019. After failing to reach an agreement with Valve, Drodo Studio partnered with Chinese production company Imba TV and Long Mobile to develop a standalone mobile version of the game called Auto Chess.

Announced on March 15, 2019, Auto Chess replaced Dota elements and features with its own separate setting. With Valve's direct technical support, Dota Auto Chess players are capable of migrating accounts to the mobile version to receive rewards.

In June 2019, game developer Riot Games announced that League of Legends would feature an auto battler of their own, known as Teamfight Tactics. That same month, Valve's standalone version of the game, Dota Underlords, was released in early access for PC and mobile platforms. A version based on Hearthstone by Blizzard Entertainment, titled Hearthstone Battlegrounds, was also announced later that year.
