= Defense of the Ancients =

2003 video game

- Defense of the Ancients' loading screen (2012)
- Designers: Eul; Steve Feak; Neichus; IceFrog
- Series: Dota
- Platforms: Windows, macOS
- Release: 2003
- Genre: MOBA
- Mode: Multiplayer

Defense of the Ancients (DotA) is a multiplayer online battle arena (MOBA) mod for the video game Warcraft III: Reign of Chaos (2002) and its expansion, The Frozen Throne (2003). The objective of the game is for each team to destroy their opponents' Ancient, a heavily guarded structure at the opposing corner of the map. Players use powerful units known as heroes, and are assisted by allied teammates and AI-controlled fighters. As in role-playing games, players level up their heroes and use gold to buy equipment during the game.

DotA has its roots in the "Aeon of Strife" custom map for StarCraft. The scenario was developed with the World Editor of Reign of Chaos, and was updated upon the release of its expansion, The Frozen Throne. There have been many variations of the original concept, the most popular being DotA Allstars, eventually simplified to DotA. The mod has been maintained by several authors during development, with the pseudonymous designer known as IceFrog maintaining the game since the mid-2000s.

DotA became a feature at several worldwide tournaments, including Blizzard Entertainment's BlizzCon and the World Cyber Games. Critical reception to DotA was positive, and it has been called one of the most popular mods of any game. DotA is largely attributed as being the most significant inspiration for the MOBA genre, refining and popularizing its core mechanics and gameplay structure. American video game developer Valve acquired the intellectual property rights to DotA in 2009 to develop a franchise, beginning with its sequel Dota 2 in 2013.

== Gameplay ==
A game of DotA in progress

Defense of the Ancients pits two teams of players against each other. Players on the Sentinel team are based at the southwest corner of the map, and those on the Scourge team are based in the northeast. Each base is defended by towers and waves of units which guard the main paths leading to their base. In the center of each base is the Ancient, the building that must be destroyed to win the game.

Each player controls one hero, a powerful unit with unique abilities. In DotA, players on each side can choose one of more than a hundred heroes, each with different abilities and tactical advantages. The scenario is highly team-oriented; it is difficult for one player to carry the team to victory alone. DotA allows up to ten players in a five-versus-five format. DotA offers a variety of game modes, selected by the game host at the beginning of the match. The game modes dictate the difficulty of the scenario, as well as whether players can choose their hero or are assigned one randomly. Many game modes can be combined, allowing more flexible options.

Because the gameplay revolves around strengthening individual heroes, it does not require the focus on resource management and base-building found in most traditional real-time strategy games. Killing computer-controlled or neutral units earns the player experience points; the player gains a level when enough experience is accumulated. Leveling up improves the hero's toughness and the damage they inflict, and allows players to upgrade spells or skills. The typical resource-gathering of Warcraft III is replaced by a combat-oriented money system; in addition to a small periodic income, heroes earn gold by killing or destroying hostile units, base structures, and enemy heroes. This creates an emphasis on "last-hitting" to land the killing blow and receive the experience and gold for doing so. Using gold, players buy items to strengthen their hero and gain abilities; certain items can be combined with recipes to create more powerful items. Buying items that suit one's hero is an important tactical element of the mod.

== Development ==
Blizzard Entertainment's 1998 real-time strategy game StarCraft shipped with a campaign editor that allowed players to create custom levels, complete with scripted triggers. One such custom map was "Aeon of Strife". Instead of controlling multiple units and managing buildings, players controlled a single hero unit as they fought against waves of enemies.

Blizzard followed StarCraft with the real-time strategy game Warcraft III in 2002. As with Warcraft II and StarCraft, Blizzard included a free World Editor in the game that allows players to create custom scenarios or maps for the game, which can be played online with other players through Battle.net. Warcraft III also featured powerful hero units that leveled up and could equip items to boost their abilities, and the World Editor enabled mapmakers to create their own. Taking inspiration from Aeon of Strife and using the expanded capabilities of the World Editor, modder "Eul" created the first version of Defense of the Ancients in 2003. The heroes could now sport different abilities and level up skills and equipment. After the release of Warcraft III's expansion The Frozen Throne, which added new features to the World Editor, Eul did not update the scenario and made his map code open-source. Other mapmakers produced Defense of the Ancients spinoffs that added new heroes, items, and features. Among the DotA variants created in the wake of Eul's map was DotA Allstars, originally created and developed by custom map makers Meian and Ragn0r, who took the most popular heroes and compiled them into one map. In March 2004, map maker Steve "Guinsoo" Feak assumed control of Allstars development. Feak said when he began developing DotA Allstars, he had no idea how popular the game would eventually become. Feak added a recipe system for items so that player's equipment would scale as they grew more powerful, as well as a powerful boss character called Roshan (named after his bowling ball) who required an entire team to defeat.

Feak used a Battle.net chat channel as a place for DotA players to congregate, but DotA Allstars had no official site for discussions and hosting. Subsequently, the leaders of the DotA Allstars clan, TDA, proposed that a dedicated web site be created to replace the various online alternatives that were infrequently updated or improperly maintained. TDA member Steve "Pendragon" Mescon created an official community site, dota-allstars.com.

Towards the end of Feak's association with the map in 2005, development of the map was controlled by Neichus, and then IceFrog. The new author, IceFrog, added new features, heroes, and fixes. IceFrog was at one time highly reclusive, refusing to give interviews; the only evidence of his authorship was the map maker's email account on the official website and the name branded on the game's loading screen. Defense of the Ancients was maintained via official forums. Users posted ideas for new heroes or items, some of which were added to the map. IceFrog would quickly update the map in response to feedback. Mescon maintained dota-allstars.com, which by May 2009 had over 1,500,000 registered users and received over one million unique visitors every month. Mescon's sale of the domain to Riot Games split the DotA community, and IceFrog announced a new official site, playdota.com, while continuing game development.

Because Warcraft III custom games have none of the features designed to improve game quality (matchmaking players based on connection speed, etc.), various programs were used to maintain Defense of the Ancients. External tools pinged player's locations, and games could be named to exclude geographic regions. Clans and committees such as TDA maintained their own official list of rules and regulations, and players could be kicked from matches by being placed on "banlists". While increasingly popular, DotA Allstars remained limited as a custom map in Warcraft III, relying on manual matchmaking, updates, and containing no tutorials.

== Reception and legacy ==
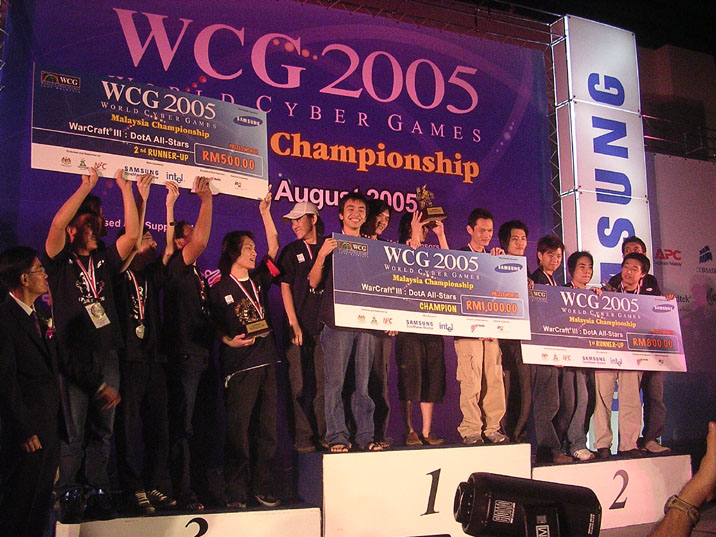
The top three finalists from the first World Cyber Games Defense of the Ancients championship

Computer Gaming World featured DotA Allstars in a 2004 review of new maps and mods in Warcraft III, and in the following years DotA Allstars became a fixture at esports tournaments. Its refined gameplay and high skill ceiling contributed to its widespread popularity in competitive environments. It debuted at Blizzard's BlizzCon convention in 2005. DotA Allstars featured in the Malaysia and Singapore World Cyber Games starting in 2005, and the World Cyber Games Asian Championships beginning with the 2006 season. Defense of the Ancients was included in the game lineup for the internationally recognized Cyberathlete Amateur League and CyberEvolution leagues. When the scenario appeared at the 2008 Electronic Sports World Cup, Oliver Paradis, the competition's manager, noted the game was chosen for the high level of community support behind the scenario and its worldwide appeal. The mod's extreme simplification of the real-time strategy formula made it more accessible for players who enjoyed the spectacle of the battles characteristic of the genre, but did not want to manage the demands of trying to control every part of the experience.

The scenario was extremely popular in many parts of the world, especially in Europe and Asia. In the Philippines and Thailand, it was played as much as the game Counter-Strike. It was also popular in Sweden and other Northern European countries, where the Defense of the Ancients-inspired song "Vi sitter i Ventrilo och spelar DotA" by Swedish musician Basshunter cracked the top ten singles charts in Sweden, Norway, and Finland. LAN tournaments were a major part of worldwide play, including tournaments in Sweden and Russia; however, due to a lack of LAN tournaments and championships in North America, several teams disbanded.

Michael Walbridge, writing for Gamasutra in 2008, stated that DotA "is likely the most popular and most-discussed free, non-supported game mod in the world". In pointing to the strong community built around the game, Walbridge stated that DotA showed it is much easier for a community game to be maintained by the community, and this is one of the maps' greatest strengths. Former game journalist Luke Smith called DotA "the ultimate RTS". Blizzard pointed to DotA as an example of what dedicated mapmakers can create using developer's tools.

Defense of the Ancients played a key role in shaping the multiplayer online battle arena (MOBA) genre, serving as a direct influence for several later titles. Demigod, released in 2009 by Gas Powered Games, was among the first games to draw inspiration from its mechanics, with GameSpy describing it as aspiring gods "[playing] DotA in real life". Feak, hired by Riot Games, applied many of the mechanics and lessons he learned from Defense of the Ancients to the core design of League of Legends. Other "DotA clones" include Heroes of Newerth by S2 Games, as well as Heroes of the Storm by Blizzard Entertainment, which brings together characters from its franchises, including heroes from Warcraft III. The MOBA design DotA popularized also made its way into games that deviated from the mod's top-down perspective, such as third-person shooters and side-scrolling platformers. DotA also shed light on the MOBA genre's challenging learning curve for new players and the often toxic and unfriendly behavior of its community.

=== Franchise ===
In October 2009, IceFrog was hired by Valve to lead a team to develop a standalone sequel to Defense of the Ancients, Dota 2. The gameplay hews closely to DotA. In addition to the pre-conceived gameplay constants, Dota 2 also features Steam support and profile tracking, intended to emphasize and support the game's matchmaking and community. The marketing and trademark of Dota as a franchise by Valve faced opposition from Riot Games and Blizzard Entertainment, who legally challenged the franchising of Dota by Valve. The legal dispute was concluded in May 2012, with Valve gaining franchising rights for commercial use to the trademark, while non-commercial use remained open to the public. Dota 2 was officially released in July 2013.
