= Aeon of Strife =

StarCraft custom map

Aeon of Strife is a custom map and mod for the real-time strategy video game StarCraft. Unlike standard StarCraft matches, it places players in control of individual powerful units while computer-controlled forces advance automatically toward opposing defenses. Published accounts disagree about the map's original creator and release date, and several versions were known to have circulated within the StarCraft custom-map community.

Aeon of Strife is regarded as a precursor to the multiplayer online battle arena (MOBA) genre. Its design was adapted by creators working with Warcraft III, including Eul, the creator of Defense of the Ancients (DotA). Later games based on the same general format include League of Legends and Dota 2.

== Gameplay and design ==
In standard matches of StarCraft, players gather resources, construct bases, produce units and command military forces. Hero units are occasionally available to be controlled by the player in single-player StarCraft campaigns, often simultaneously with the command of a conventional army. Aeon of Strife instead centers gameplay around a single powerful unit controlled by the player, while computer-controlled units called "creeps" automatically spawn and move between opposing bases. The player's role is not intended to micromanage this battle of attrition nor to build any structures, but instead to carefully tilt the battlefield in their favour by strategically supporting the computer-controlled units to destroy enemy defensive structures and, eventually, the base.

Descriptions of Aeon of Strife differ because multiple versions of the map circulated within the StarCraft custom-map community. Stephanie Boluk and Patrick LeMieux described Aeon of Strife as combining mechanics associated with real-time strategy, action-adventure, role-playing and tower defense games. In their account, an early form of Aeon of Strife sees up to four player-controlled heroes defended towers from computer-controlled enemies travelling along four lanes. GamesBeat described a version in which there were three lanes instead of four, heroes did not gain levels during a match, and there were no neutral areas between lanes.

Other accounts describe players accompanying automatically generated units along predetermined routes toward an enemy base. Players could earn currency and spend it on weapons and armor, with the objective of destroying a structure at the opposing base.

== Development and early history ==
StarCraft and its expansion Brood War included StarEdit, an editor that allowed players to create maps and scripted scenarios with rules different from the standard game. Custom maps could be distributed through Battle.net, including through downloads made when players joined multiplayer games. Simon Dor observed that this system as allowing players to share, alter and redistribute maps.

Published accounts give different names and dates for the original version of Aeon of Strife. Boluk and LeMieux attribute it to a designer using the name "Aeon64", as do histories published by GamesBeat and MCV/Develop. GamesBeat and MCV date its creation to 1998. The gameography in Metagaming, however, lists Aeon of Strife as dating from approximately 2002. A 2019 history published by Red Bull instead credits a designer known as "Gunner_4_ever".

== Influence and legacy ==
Video game journalist Jason Schreier described Aeon of Strife as one of the most popular custom maps made for StarCraft. Dor calls it one of the most renowned maps to emerge from the player-created map culture within the StarCraft community.

The release of Warcraft III gave custom-map creators access to the more extensive World Editor, which allows more detailed manipulation of terrain, objects and triggers, as well as imported assets and scripting. In 2003, a designer known as Eul created Defense of the Ancients, by combining the main concepts of Aeon of Strife and the hero mechanics included in Warcraft III. A 2009 postmortem by people involved with the later development of DotA identifies Aeon of Strife as the inspiration for Eul's map. DotA uses two competing teams of players and added character progression, items and other role-playing elements. Boluk and LeMieux describe it as an expansion of the earlier Aeon of Strife format, with two teams of five players fighting alongside computer-controlled units, while Schrier summarised it as a five-on-five competitive game with a greater emphasis on teamwork and strategy.

Dor discusses Aeon of Strife in his history of StarCraft modding and traces its adaptation through Defense of the Ancients to League of Legends, Dota 2 and other MOBA games. Boluk and LeMieux also drew comparisons between the layout of Aeon of Strife and those of subsequent video games it has influenced, having identified Aeon of Strife's map structure, gameplay mechanics and objectives, as well as the continued use of a broadly symmetrical, lane-based battlefield as early forms of three components adapted by these later games.

GamesBeat credited Aeon of Strife as laying groundwork for the MOBA genre as a whole, while MCV/Develop identifies it as an early example of gameplay that later became associated with MOBAs. Van Allen places the map early in a history of player-created modifications that were later adapted into separate games and genres.
