= Multiplayer online battle arena =

Video game genre

Multiplayer online battle arena (MOBA) (Note: Also known as action real-time strategy (ARTS) or, more recently, as hero brawler and team brawler) is a subgenre of strategy video games in which two teams of players compete on a structured battlefield, each controlling a single character with distinctive abilities that grow stronger as the match progresses. The objective is to destroy the enemy team's main structure while defending one's own. In some MOBA games, the objective can be defeating every player on the enemy team. Matches emphasize team coordination, tactical choices, and real-time combat. Players are assisted by computer-controlled units that periodically spawn in groups and march along set paths toward their enemy's base, which is heavily guarded by defensive structures. Players can influence these units by eliminating enemy waves or supporting their own, affecting lane control and map pressure. This type of multiplayer online video games originated as a subgenre of real-time strategy (RTS); however, most of the traditional RTS elements, such as building construction and unit production, were removed in favor of a more focused player-versus-player experience. The genre blends elements of real-time strategy, role-playing, and action games, combining strategic depth with individual character progression and fast-paced combat.

The first widely accepted game in the genre was Aeon of Strife, a fan-made custom map released in 2002 for StarCraft, in which four players each control a single powerful unit and, aided by weak computer-controlled units, compete against a computer-controlled enemy force, which is initially stronger. Defense of the Ancients (DotA) was created in 2003 by the Warcraft III modding community for Warcraft III: Reign of Chaos and its expansion, The Frozen Throne, with a map based on AoS. DotA was one of the first major titles to establish the core mechanics of the MOBA genre, serving as a direct inspiration for later titles, and the first MOBA for which sponsored tournaments were held. It was followed by two spiritual successors, League of Legends (2009) and Heroes of Newerth (2010), a standalone sequel, Dota 2 (2013), and other games in the genre, including Smite (2014) and Heroes of the Storm (2015).

Through the years, the MOBA genre has played a significant role in the rise of competitive esports. By the early 2010s, the genre had established itself as a major component of the esports landscape, with prize pools reaching over US$60 million in 2018, accounting for 40% of the total esports prize pools that year. Major esports professional tournaments are held in venues that can hold tens of thousands of spectators and are streamed online. A strong fanbase has opened up the opportunity for sponsorship and advertising, eventually leading the genre to become a global cultural phenomenon.

== Gameplay ==
A generic map layout popular in MOBA games. Yellow lines are the "lanes" where the action is focused. Blue and red dots are the "towers", the main line of defense for both teams. Green area is the jungle. Two light-colored areas are the teams' bases which encompass the blue and red corners, the structures upon which destruction results in victory.

Each match starts with two opposing teams, typically with five players each. Players work together as a team to achieve the ultimate victory condition, which is to destroy their enemy's base whilst protecting their own. Both teams usually have their main structures placed on opposite sides of the battlefield. The first team to destroy the opponents' main structure wins the match, though some games have the option of different victory conditions. Destroying other structures in the enemy's base may provide other benefits. Defensive structures, usually automatic "towers", are in place to prevent this. Each team is assisted by relatively weak computer-controlled units, called "minions", that periodically spawn in groups at both bases, marching down predefined paths (called "lanes") toward the enemy base. While minions naturally engage opposing forces, players can support them to increase their effectiveness in pushing through enemy defenses. There are typically three "lanes" on the battlefield that serve as primary paths between bases. The lanes are known as top, middle and bottom lane, or, in gamer shorthand – "top", "mid" and "bot". Between the lanes is an uncharted area called "jungle". The "jungle" is home to neutral monsters hostile to both teams and appear in marked locations on the map known as "camps". Defeating these monsters grants various benefits to the players and their team, such as growth in power, temporary buffs, or assistance in pushing the lane. Effective control over lanes and jungle objectives is crucial for maintaining map pressure and dictating the flow of the match.

The games are usually played on a battlefield shown from an isometric perspective, but certain MOBAs are played from a third-person or side-view perspective. The battlefield is represented in the interface by the mini-map.

A player controls a single powerful in-game unit, known as a "hero" or "champion," with a distinctive set of abilities and a unique playstyle. Heroes gain experience points and gold by being near defeated enemies or delivering the killing blow. Experience allows them to level up and enhance abilities, while gold is used to purchase items that improve their power. Most heroes have four abilities that can be upgraded as they progress. If a hero runs out of health points and dies, they are removed from active play until a respawn timer counts down to zero, at which point the hero respawns in their base. The respawn time increases as the game progresses and heroes level up.

Heroes typically fall into one of several roles, such as tank, damage dealer, and support, each with unique designs, strengths, and weaknesses. MOBAs typically offer a large number of viable playable heroes – League of Legends, for instance, began with 40, and added characters over time, reaching 100 in 2012 and 150 in 2020. This contributes to the game's strategic depth and learning curve as players must be aware of an increasing list of available characters. Choosing the right character is a skill, requiring players to evaluate available options and select one that fits their skill set, team composition, and opposing picks. Players often find a hero they excel at, referred to as a "main", and familiarize themselves with the remaining roster. Each hero is limited in the roles they can fulfill. No single hero is supposed to be powerful enough to win the game without team support. This creates a strong emphasis on teamwork and cooperation. The genre rewards players that are capable of cooperating with teammates to execute an effective strategy, enabling full potential of their individual abilities and mechanical skills.

Each player typically receives a small amount of gold per second during the course of the game. Moderate amounts of gold are rewarded for killing hostile computer-controlled units and larger amounts are rewarded for killing enemy heroes. Gold is used by heroes to buy a variety of different items that range in price and impact. For the most part, this involves improving the combat viability of the hero, although there may be other items that support the hero or team as a whole in different ways. As the heroes of each team get stronger, they can use multiple strategies to gain an advantage. These strategies can include securing objectives, killing enemy heroes, and gaining levels by defeating computer-controlled units. As a team grows stronger, they gain greater control over the map, apply more pressure on the opponent, and become more capable of dismantling the enemy's defenses and structures, ultimately leading to the destruction of their base.

=== Character classes and roles ===
In most MOBAs, playable characters have assigned classes such as "tank", "bruiser", "marksman", "mage", "fighter", "assassin", "support" and "healer", with each classification denoting various different skill sets and proficiencies. During the match, characters can be played in roles such as "carry", "support" and "ganker"; however, the number and type of roles can differ depending on the game. The carry role is expected to scale and itemize themselves to do the most damage against enemy characters and objectives, but may also require protection and assistance from their team members. Supports assist their team with abilities that aid allies and disable enemies, rather than dealing damage directly. Some supports have healing abilities which can be vital factor in the team composition's success, giving health and sustenance to their allies while limiting the enemy's options in terms of play patterns. Ganker roles are flexible, as they have both carry and support skills that are used to disrupt and eliminate enemies, thus giving their teammates an advantage over their opponents. Gankers can "act as a strategist, decision-maker or supporter depending on the team's needs." Player roles can be classified by the particular lane they are focusing on, such as "top laner", "mid laner", and "bottom laner", or by their role in a teamfight, such as "frontliner", "damage dealer", "healer", "flex", and the "offlaner".

=== Resemblance to other genres ===
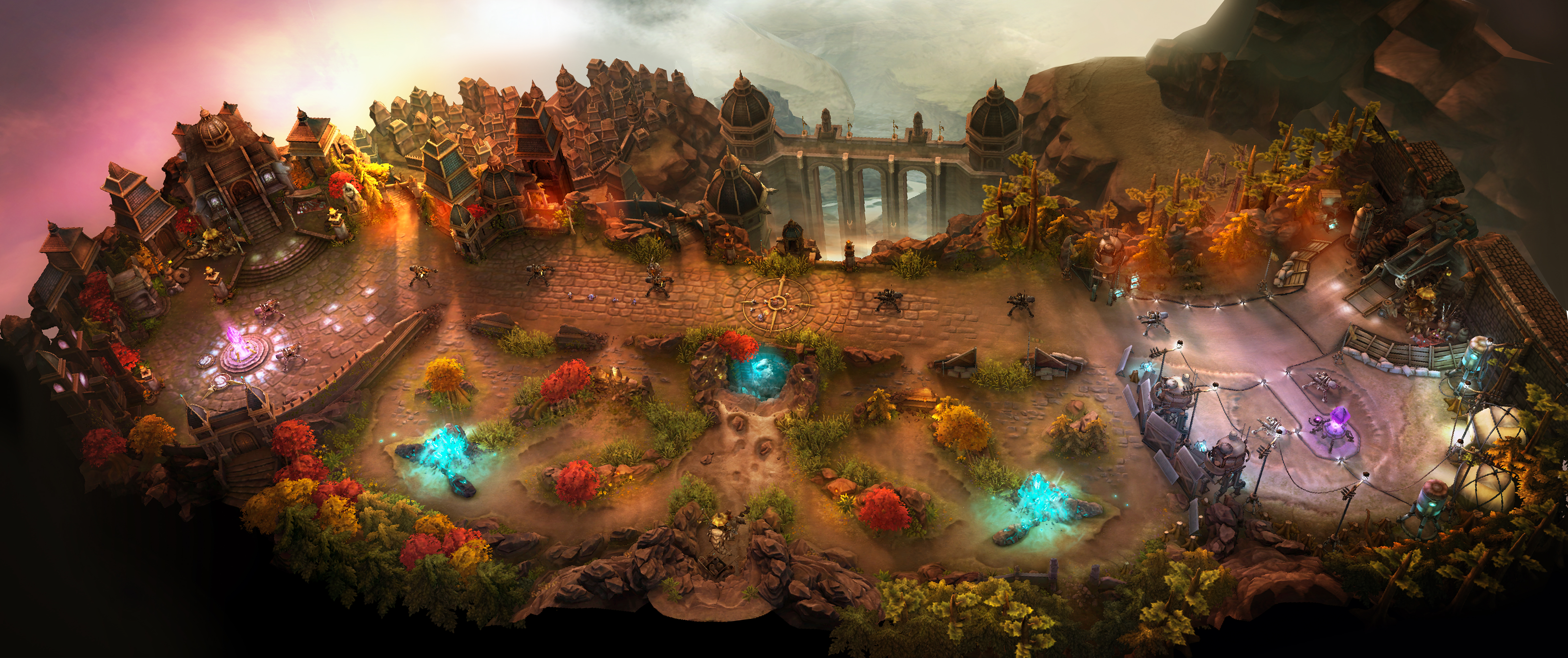
The Halcyon Fold map from the game Vainglory features a single lane connecting the two team bases, and the "jungle" underbrush beneath the lane.

As a fusion of real-time strategy (RTS), role-playing, and action games, MOBAs have many elements of established genres while still offering unique gameplay. In general, the design philosophy of the MOBA genre has moved away from constructing structures, army building, and controlling additional units in favor of hero-centric gameplay. However, some MOBA games have certain heroes that control a few specialized units, but not on the massive scale commonly found in RTS games. Much like real-time strategy games, structures and base defense play a crucial role in MOBAs, with the victory condition often being the destruction of the main structure in the enemy base. Players can find various friendly and enemy units on the map assisting each team. However, these units are computer-controlled and players usually do not control their movement or creation. Instead of building them, players rely on these units to move along the map's lanes.

Many defining elements of the action genre are represented in MOBA games. Players with better mechanical skills and quick reaction times typically excel relative to their peers. MOBAs often have a strong focus on micromanagement, involving mechanical abilities such as positioning, dodging, use of combo attacks, kiting, prediction and target selection. Direction-targeted abilities, or "skillshots", require precise aim and good timing in order to hit an enemy.

The MOBA genre resembles role-playing games (RPGs) in gameplay, though the MOBA genre focuses on the multiplayer battle in the arena-like environment, whereas RPGs typically revolve around a single-player story and exploration of different locations. Some key features of MOBAs, such as control over one specific character in a party, growth in power over time, learning new thematic abilities, leveling and accumulation of experience points, usage of the mana resource, equipment and inventory management, completing quests, and fighting with powerful boss monsters, are also typical of role-playing games.

== History ==
=== Origins ===
The 1989 Mega Drive/Genesis game Herzog Zwei has variously been cited either as a precursor to, or an early example of, the MOBA genre. It uses a similar formula, where each player controls a single command unit in one of two opposing sides on a battlefield. Herzog Zwei's influence is apparent in several later MOBA games such as Guilty Gear 2: Overture (2007) and AirMech (2012). Herzog Zwei was also cited as an inspiration to the developers of Warcraft and Starcraft.

1998's Future Cop: LAPD has a strategic "Precinct Assault" mode similar to Herzog Zwei in which players can actively fight alongside generated non-player units. This could be regarded as the first example of MOBA gameplay, depending on the definition of the genre. The Windows version of Future Cop: LAPD allows online competitive play.

In the same year, Blizzard Entertainment released its best-selling real-time strategy game StarCraft (1998) with a suite of game editing tools called StarEdit. These tools allowed players to design and create custom maps with non-standard rules and gameplay, such as Aeon of Strife. Some of the key features introduced in the map became the foundation of the newborn genre. In Aeon of Strife, players controlled a single powerful hero unit fighting along three lanes which were protected by defensive towers.

=== Establishing the genre: 2000s ===
In 2002, Blizzard released Warcraft III: Reign of Chaos (WC3), with the accompanying Warcraft III World Editor. Both the multiplayer online battle arena and tower defense subgenres took substantive shape within the WC3 modding community. A modder named Eul began converting Aeon of Strife into the Warcraft III engine, calling the map Defense of the Ancients (DotA). Eul significantly expanded the complexity of play from the original Aeon of Strife mod. Shortly after creating the custom DotA map, Eul left the modding scene. With no clear successor, Warcraft III modders created a variety of maps based on DotA and featuring different heroes. In 2003, after the release of WarCraft III: The Frozen Throne, a map creator named Meian created a DotA variant closely modeled on Eul's map, but combining heroes from the many other versions of DotA that existed at the time. Called DotA: Allstars, it was inherited after a few months by a modder called Steve "Guinsoo" Feak, and under his guidance it became the dominant map of the genre. After more than a year of maintaining the DotA: Allstars map, with the impending release of an update that significantly changed the map layout, Guinsoo left the development to his adjutant Neichus in the year 2005. After some weeks of development and some versions released, the latter turned over responsibility to a modder named IceFrog, who implemented substantial changes to the mechanics that deepened its complexity and capacity for innovative gameplay. The changes conducted by IceFrog proved popular with the community and the number of users on the Dota: Allstars forum reportedly peaked at over one million. DotA is widely regarded as the most significant influence on the MOBA genre, shaping its core mechanics and inspiring the development of numerous titles in the years to come.

=== Mainstream popularity: 2008–present ===
By 2008, the popularity of DotA had attracted commercial attention. Since the format was tied to the Warcraft property, developers began to work on their own "DOTA-style" video games. A Flash web game, named Minions, was created by The Casual Collective in 2008. Gas Powered Games released the first stand-alone commercial title in the genre, Demigod (2009). In late 2009, Riot Games' debut title League of Legends was released. It was initially designed by Steve Feak, one of the original creators of DotA: Allstars, who went on to apply many of the mechanics and lessons he learned from the mod. Riot began to refer to the game's genre as a multiplayer online battle arena (MOBA). Also in 2009, IceFrog, who had continued to develop DotA: Allstars, was hired by Valve, in order to design a sequel to the original map.

In 2010, S2 Games released Heroes of Newerth, which was heavily inspired by DotA: Allstars in terms of gameplay and aesthetics. The same year, Valve announced Dota 2 and subsequently secured the franchise's intellectual property rights after being contested by Riot Games for the DotA trademark. In 2012, Activision Blizzard settled a trademark dispute with Valve over the usage of the DOTA name and announced their own standalone game which was eventually named Heroes of the Storm. Dota 2 was released in 2013, and was referred to by Valve as an "action real-time strategy" game. In 2014, Hi-Rez Studios released Smite, a MOBA with a third-person perspective. Heroes of the Storm was released in 2015, featuring hero characters from Warcraft III and other Blizzard's franchises. Blizzard adopted their own personal dictation for their game's genre with "hero brawler", citing its focus on action.

With the expansion of the smartphone market, numerous MOBA titles have been released for portable devices, such as Vainglory (2014), and Honor of Kings (2015). An international adaptation of Honor of Kings developed by TiMi Studios and published by Tencent Games for markets outside mainland China, rebranded as Arena of Valor (2016), was released in the western market in 2017. In 2021, the Pokémon series released its first MOBA game in Pokémon Unite.

==== Next-generation wave and market saturation ====
During the last half of the 2010s, video game developers and publishers, following the success of League of Legends and Dota 2, tried to be part of the next-generation MOBA wave by putting their own twist in the genre, releasing games such as Battlerite (2017), and AirMech (2018). After years of development, many games which were supported by large publishers have not been fully released or their servers were shut down shortly after release. The most notable examples are Dawngate (2015) (Note: The number in brackets represents the year of official servers shut down.) by Electronic Arts, DC Comics-based Infinite Crisis (2015) by Warner Bros., Arena of Fate (2016) by Crytek, Gigantic (2017) by Perfect World Entertainment, Master X Master (2018) by NCSoft, and Paragon (2018) by Epic Games.

The saturation of the market and the dominance of established titles contributed to the decline of many new MOBA attempts, as they struggled to retain player engagement and compete with the genre's leading games.

In 2024, Valve announced their second MOBA title, Deadlock, after it was leaked by playtesters earlier that year. DotA developer Icefrog was rumoured to be involved in its development. Deadlock is a third-person MOBA with a heavy emphasis on movement and verticality.

== Impact ==
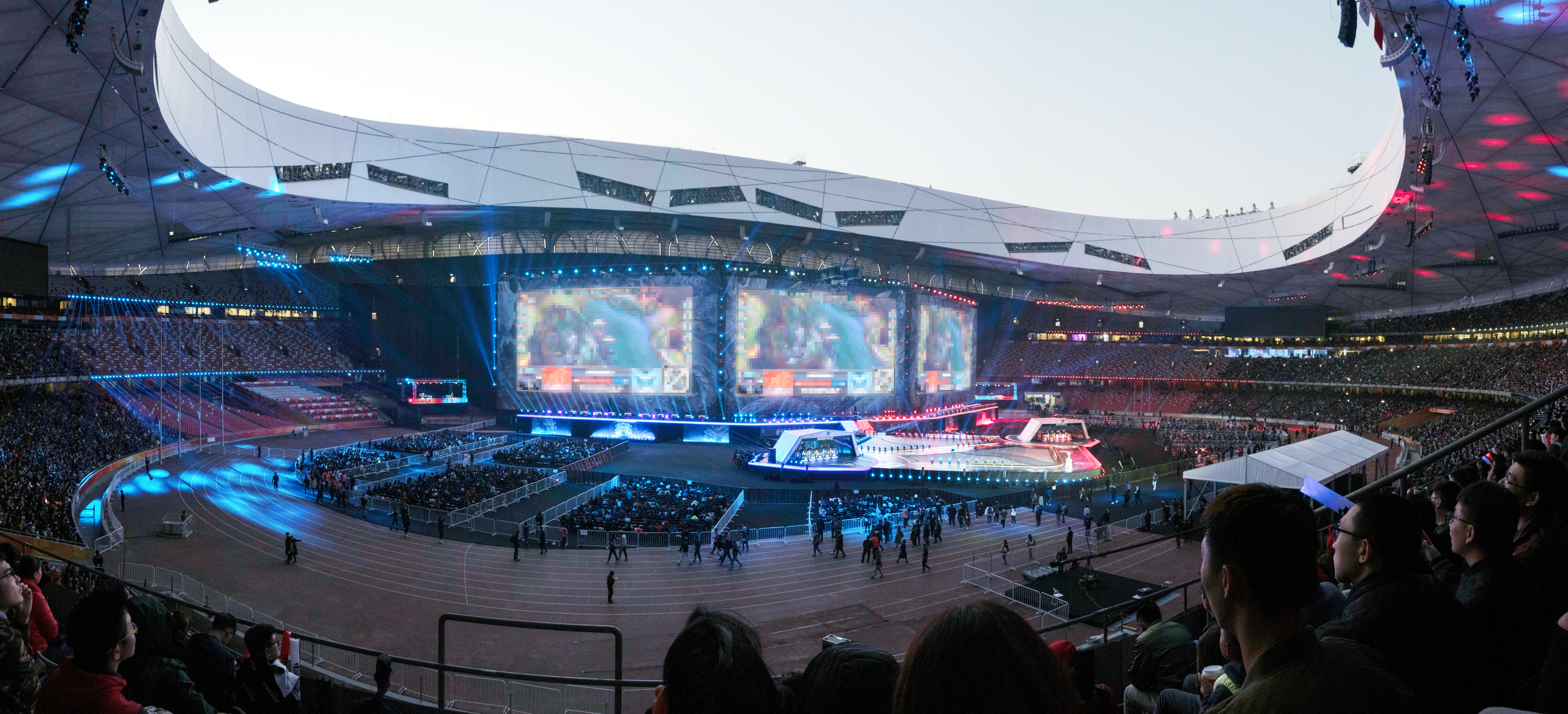
The 2017 League of Legends World Championship Finals held in the Beijing National Stadium, China

In the original Defense of the Ancients (DotA), each player controls one powerful unit rather than a large army. While it still kept the large scale, core mechanics, and goals of the real-time strategy games, DotA attempted to avoid "clickfest" gameplay in which high actions per minute scores are mandatory for efficient playing, changing focus to the actual teamwork, coordination, and tactics. This made the mod highly popular, as its dynamic and unpredictable fights, complex map, and hero-centric gameplay creates a more competitive environment and opportunities for outplaying the enemy team. Over time, the multiplayer online battle arena genre grew steadily within esports tournaments, becoming a major part of the competitive gaming scene by the early 2010s. The genre has seen further growth in popularity since the year 2015 – among the top five esports with the largest prize pools, three have been MOBA titles for three years in row. Distributed prize money in MOBA tournaments reached over US$54 million in 2017. A year later, prize pools continued to grow reaching over US$60 million, 40% of the year's total esports prize pools. 2018 League of Legends World Championship had the biggest prize pool out of all League of Legends esports championship finals, awarding almost $6.5 million.

MOBAs are some of the largest audiences for games in the world. Major esports professional tournaments are held in venues that can hold tens of thousands of spectators and are streamed online to millions of people by influencers and streamers such as Caedrel and OhnePixel. An active fanbase has opened up the opportunity for sponsorship and advertising, eventually leading the genre to become a global cultural phenomenon.

A free-to-play business model, which is used by the largest MOBA titles, have contributed to the genre's overall popularity. Players are able to download and play AAA-quality games at no cost. These games are generating revenue by selling cosmetic elements, including skins, voice lines, customized mounts and announcers, but none of these give the functional gameplay advantages to the buyer. As of 2012, free-to-play MOBAs, such as League of Legends, Dota 2, Heroes of the Storm, and Smite were among the most popular PC games. The success in the genre has helped convince many video game publishers to copy the free-to-play MOBA model. SuperData Research reported that the genre generated over $2.5 billion of revenue in 2017.

Similar to fighting games, MOBAs offer a large number of viable player characters, each of which having distinctive abilities, strengths, and weaknesses. With numerous choices available, players can find the character that best fits their skills and preferences. Playable characters blend a variety of fantasy tropes and often reference popular culture and mythology. One such figure commonly represented in MOBAs is Sun Wukong, a legendary mythical figure from 16th-century China. Examples of representation of Sun Wukong in MOBAs in the form of playable characters include "Wukong" in League of Legends, Samuro's "Monkey King" skin (custom outfit/costume) in Heroes of the Storm, and "Monkey King" in DotA 2.

=== Data analytics and match prediction ===
Due to the large volume of matches played on a daily basis around the world and the relatively complicated nature of the genre, (Note: League of Legends alone had a reported 100 million active monthly players worldwide in 2016 and an average of 27 million League of Legends games played per day reported in 2014.) MOBAs have become a popular target for the application of big data tools to predict match outcomes based on in-game factors such as hero kill/death/assist ratios, gold earned, time of a match, synergy with other players, team composition, and other, more advanced parameters.

=== Artificial intelligence in MOBAs ===
The use of artificial intelligence in MOBAs is an ongoing topic of research. Similar to real-time strategy games, MOBAs provide a highly complex environment for AI because of their large amount of possible variables, states, and decisions. One of the first known research-based MOBA AI agents was published around 2015 for League of Legends. The agent used influence maps to navigate the map and compute positioning risk. A similar agent to assist players was published in the same year.

Two years later, artificial intelligence research laboratory OpenAI developed the AI project OpenAI Five, which was first showcased at the Dota 2 World Championship, The International 2017, during a 1v1 demonstration. In this demonstration, OpenAI Five faced off against Dendi, a DotA player. In this 1v1, OpenAI Five defeated Dendi twice convincingly, with the first victory occurring before the five-minute mark and Dendi conceding before ninety seconds had passed in the second match. OpenAI returned to The International 2018, this time fielding an entire team of five AI players in two games against professional players, but ultimately losing both games. Despite this loss, OpenAI continued to work to improve OpenAI Five, and the project's advancement soon became evident: one year later, at The International 2019, OpenAI Five defeated The International 2018-winner OG in a limited version of Dota 2, becoming the first artificial intelligence system to beat the reigning world champion team at a video game.

== See also ==
- List of multiplayer online battle arena games
