= Artifact (video game) =

2018 video game

- Developer: Valve
- Publisher: Valve
- Director: Brandon Reinhart
- Designer: Richard Garfield
- Programmers: Brad Muir; Jeep Barnett; Bruno Carlucci
- Writer: Steve Jaros
- Composer: Tim Larkin
- Series: Dota
- Engine: Source 2
- Platforms: Windows; macOS; Linux
- Release: November 28, 2018
- Genre: Digital collectible card game
- Mode: Multiplayer

Artifact is a 2018 digital collectible card game by Valve for Windows, macOS, and Linux. It focuses on online player-versus-player battles and is based on the universe of Dota 2, a multiplayer online battle arena game by Valve. Artifact was designed by Magic: The Gathering creator Richard Garfield.

While Artifact's gameplay and drafting mechanics received praise, it was criticized for its high learning curve and monetization model, which some saw as pay-to-win. It saw a 95% decline in players within two months of its release, with only around a hundred concurrent players by mid-2019. Valve was surprised by the response, describing it as the largest discrepancy between their expectations for a game and the outcome.

Valve reworked the game as Artifact 2.0, altering several features, including removing the need to buy or trade cards with money. It was tested through a closed beta starting in March 2020. A year later, Valve announced that it had ceased development of the game, citing a lack of player interest, and made both versions of the game freeware. The original Artifact was renamed Artifact Classic and Artifact 2.0 was renamed Artifact Foundry.

== Gameplay ==
Artifact has players competing in three separate boards in sequential order, mimicking the three lanes of Dota 2's map.

Artifact is a digital collectible card game in which players build a deck of collectable cards purchased on the Steam Marketplace to defeat an opponent in one-on-one battles. It features many elements from the multiplayer online battle arena game Dota 2, also developed by Valve. Unlike most collectible card games, it features three "lanes" guarded by a tower at the end, with each lane existing as an independent board. The victor is the first player to either destroy a structure called the Ancient, which appears after a tower has been destroyed, or the first to destroy two towers in total. As with Dota 2, Artifact focuses on online player versus player matchmaking; it has no single-player mode beyond a tutorial mode against an AI opponent.

Each deck contains at least 40 cards, with a total of nearly 300 cards available at the game's launch. Cards are grouped into three rarity tiers, common, uncommon, and rare, and are further grouped into four color themes, red, green, black, and blue, that each have their own unique effects on the board. Each lane also has its own independent mana pool, which is used for casting hero abilities and grows by one point after each round while also fully replenishing. In addition to hero abilities, item cards can also be freely placed and used in any lane. Each time a card is played, the initiative passes to the opposing player. After all cards have been played in a lane, heroes and "creeps", which are weak but numerous mobs that can not be directly controlled and respawn every round, begin attacking whatever is opposite them, including the opposing tower if there are no units left. This repeats until all three lanes have been played, after which it goes to the "Shopping Phase", where gold accumulated during battles is spent on buying items and upgrading hero equipment in three different slots for weapons, armor, and accessories.

== Development ==
Development of Artifact began in late 2014, with lead designer Richard Garfield brought in to help make a digital card game due to his experience with creating the popular Magic: The Gathering franchise. The game was then announced via a teaser trailer played at The International 2017, a large Dota 2-specific esports tournament organized by Valve, although no specific details were revealed. More details regarding its concept and gameplay were revealed by Valve president Gabe Newell during a meeting with gaming press at Valve's headquarters in March 2018. There, Newell stated that it was not originally intended to be based on Dota 2, but it was decided to do so later in development as it was "useful". Newell also stated that it would not be free-to-play like Dota 2 and other similar card game competitors, and that the team wished for it to avoid becoming "pay-to-win". He hoped Artifact would be for card games what Half-Life 2 had been for single-player action games.

Artifact was created using Valve's Source 2 game engine, and features direct integration with the Steam Marketplace for buying and selling cards. While acknowledging that card games and Steam Marketplace transactions can both get expensive, such as with gun cosmetics in Valve's own Counter-Strike: Global Offensive, Garfield notes that printing restrictions do not exist with digital cards, and that Valve would directly control the production of them to limit extreme rarity. In addition, purchased card packs always include a rare card in them, which Valve hoped would prevent single cards being sold for high prices as it would be more valuable to purchase packs. Artifact also allows players to assemble decks outside of the game by using third-party tools, which can then be imported back into the game. Wanting to build upon what they had learned from Dota 2, Global Offensive, and Team Fortress 2, Valve planned for the game to have a professional esports scene, with revenue made from card pack purchasing feeding into tournament prize pools, similar to Dota 2's "Compendium" crowdfunding system. Valve planned for a million-dollar tournament to take place in 2019, but due to the game's commercial failure, no tournament was ever held.

Artifact was planned to be developed alongside Dota 2, where both games would share new heroes and other content. Writer Steve Jaros wrote character lore for Dota 2 and continued that role with Artifact by having each individual card provide more of it, all fully voiced, which he hopes would keep both games narratively connected. Programmer Jeep Barnett said they planned to have card set expansions progress over time, so that heroes in one set may have an aged version in a future set, or may die in one, and events of previous expansions can influence future ones. The soundtrack was written by Tim Larkin, who also composed for Dota 2.

=== Release ===
Artifact entered closed beta in early 2018, with numerous gaming industry members and professional card game players invited to test it. It was publicly playable for the first time at PAX West 2018, with a tournament hosted and all attendees receiving signed artwork prints and product keys for two free copies of the game. A beta for the PC version was released a week before the official launch, with attendees of The International 2018 Dota 2 tournament and its showing at PAX West given access to it.

Artifact was released for Windows, macOS and Linux on November 28, 2018, and was planned for Android and iOS devices in 2019. To help promote the game, a 128-player tournament featuring a US$10,000 prize pool was held on November 10–11, 2018. In addition, two webcomics by Valve were released to coincide with the game's launch. All owners of the game were given a redeemable token worth a free month of "Dota Plus", Dota 2's battle pass feature.

=== Artifact 2.0 ===
In 2020, following a lack of player interest, Newell told Edge that Valve had begun reworking Artifact as a new game, Artifact 2.0. The primary change was to eliminate card purchases and make all three lanes visible at the same time. The game would also include a single-player campaign. A closed beta started in March 2020. That month, Garfield and another Magic: The Gathering designer, Skaff Elias, among other contractors and employees, were laid off from Valve.

In March 2021, Valve announced that it had halted development of Artifact 2.0., saying they had not attracted enough players to justify further work. They made both Artifact games, renamed Artifact Classic and Artifact Foundry, completely free.

== Reception ==
=== Critical response ===
Reception

Aggregate score
Aggregator	Score
Metacritic	76/100

Review scores
Publication	Score
Destructoid	8.5/10
Game Informer	8.5/10
GameSpot	8/10
IGN	8.5/10
Jeuxvideo.com	15/20
PC Gamer (US)	80/100
PCGamesN	8/10

Artifact's gameplay and depth were praised, with Ali Jones of PCGamesN stating in a preview that the game was a "cut above" other card games he had played before. He also added that it successfully captured elements from two different genres, creating something that he was "hugely excited to return to". The game was also being compared to Hearthstone, with Mike Minotti of Venture Beat considering Artifact as the more complex, in-depth option that has a chance of become the leading digital card game on the market. While also noting the game's complexity, Julian Benson of PCGamesN compared it more to Magic: The Gathering as its creator, Richard Garfield, served as the lead designer on the game.

Tim Clark of PC Gamer praised the art style and presentation, noting that all of the game's assets were new and not directly copied over from Dota 2. Clark also stated that he could not wait to play more of the game, saying that he did not see it as a "cash grab" that others said it would be. James Davenport of the same publication thought that the gameplay was akin to Magic: The Gathering meeting three simultaneous games of Uno, and stated that while the game at first looked "extremely complex", it did not take him long to understand and begin playing. Eric Van Allen of Polygon added that while the game demands investment to learn, it was "intensely rewarding" for those who stuck with it and did not mind its monetization model.

=== Player response ===
Reception to the Artifact announcement at The International in 2017 was mixed, with the crowd voicing their disapproval. The trailer, uploaded to YouTube, soon featured a high dislike-to-like ratio with commenters expressing their disappointment with Valve seemingly abandoning their other franchises, such as Half-Life, in favor of recent gaming trends. As Artifact was not initially free-to-play like many of its competitors, criticism was also directed at the monetization model; some players and critics called it "pay-to-win", as new cards could only be purchased and not traded from the Steam Marketplace, or gained as rewards in specific drafting game modes that require the purchase of a ticket to participate in.

Artifact's concurrent player count dropped from 60,000 at launch to just over 1,500 within two months of its release, a 95% decline. By July 2019, Artifact had only around 100 concurrent players. In its first month of release, it averaged 8,300 viewers on the streaming service Twitch; by February 2020, it had lost 97% of this amount, and on April 8 viewers hit zero. In response, internet trolls began using the Artifact Twitch category to stream pornography and other content that violated Twitch's terms of service, prompting Twitch to temporarily suspend new creators from streaming.

In March 2019, Valve said it was pausing its scheduled updates to the game to "re-examine" its decisions about its design, economy, social elements, and other issues. In a statement on Valve's website, programmer Jeep Barnett said that Artifact represented the largest discrepancy between Valve's expectations for a game and the outcome. In March 2020, Newell said Artifact had been a "great disappointment", and that Valve planned to learn from its mistakes. He told Edge that they were surprised by the response as they "thought that it was a really strong product".

Garfield felt Artifact had failed because it was review bombed early on, with players upset over the apparent pay-to-win mechanics; this drove new players away, preventing the game economy from stabilizing at a point where the cost of building winning decks would have been on par with other digital card games, such as Hearthstone. He said that he and Elias were still optimistic about the game's future and would offer feedback and advice to Valve.

=== Awards ===
Artifact was nominated for "Game, Strategy" at the National Academy of Video Game Trade Reviewers Awards; and for "Best Interactive Score" and "Best Original Choral Composition" at the 2019 G.A.N.G. Awards.
