= Esports Awards =

Annual international gaming awards ceremony

- Awarded for: Excellence in esports performance, content creation, and industry contribution
- Location: Various (London, Arlington, Las Vegas, Riyadh)
- First award: 2016; 10 years ago
- Website: esportsawards.com

The Esports Awards is an annual international awards ceremony that recognizes achievements across the competitive gaming industry. Established in 2016 as the eSports Industry Awards, the event was rebranded to the Esports Awards in 2018.

The ceremony features a broad range of competitive gaming as well as creative categories, combines public voting with panel-selected judging, and is broadcast live across digital and social media platforms.

Over the years, the Esports Awards has grown into one of the most recognized events in the gaming industry, with ceremonies held in London, Arlington, and Riyadh, among other global locations. The event has partnered with several brands over the years, including Lexus, Verizon, Razer, and Secretlab.

== History ==
=== Origins (2016–2018) ===
The Esports Awards began in 2016 under the name eSports Industry Awards, with its inaugural ceremony held in London, United Kingdom.The inaugural ceremony featured 18 categories covering esports players, teams, organizations, and media figures in the competitive gaming scene.

In 2017, the organisers officially registered the shorter title Esports Awards, marking the first steps toward a rebrand. However, the complete transition to the new name was done in 2018, by which time the "Industry" label had been fully removed from the official logo and other brand materials.

=== Expansion in the US market (2019–2021) ===
Following several UK editions, the awards expanded geographically and commercially. In 2019 the organisation staged a ceremony at Esports Stadium Arlington in Texas, marking a strategic move into the United States market.

In 2021, the Esports Awards announced a complete rebrand ahead of that year's ceremony in Arlington, Texas. The updated logo featured a silhouette of the new trophy design.

=== Recent developments (2022–present) ===
From 2021 onward, the Esports Awards increased its production scale, commercial partnerships and global footprint. The 2021 ceremony at Esports Stadium Arlington reported large viewership, attracting over 20 million global viewers. In 2022, they relocated to Resorts World Las Vegas, marking its debut in Nevada, and returned to the same venue in 2023.

In 2023, Esports Awards and Xfinity set the Guinness World Record for the largest digital videogame display. The record-breaking installation consisted of 3,552 LED panels covering approximately 7,673 m^{2}.

In June 2024, the Esports Awards announced a multi-year partnership with the Esports World Cup Foundation. The agreement covers a three-year collaboration beginning with the 2024 Esports World Cup, which took place in Riyadh, Saudi Arabia.

In 2025, marking the tenth anniversary of the Esports Awards, organisers introduced the inaugural Esports Decade Awards. This standalone series of honours recognised players, teams, organisations, games and events that made the most significant impact over the past decade. Meanwhile, the standard yearly Esports Awards ceremony for 2025 is also scheduled to take place later the same year.

== Categories ==
Over the years, Esports Awards has featured a broad and evolving slate of honours. Some categories are introduced, retired, or merged depending on industry trends. Meanwhile, here are a few core categories that have persisted since the beginning.

- Esports Team of the Year
- Esports Game of the Year
- Esports Publisher of the Year
- Esports Organisation of the Year
- Esports PC Player of the Year
- Esports Console/Controller Player of the Year
- Esports Breakthrough Player of the Year
- Esports Streamer of the Year
- Esports Coach of the Year
- Esports Host of the Year
- Esports Commercial Partner of the Year

== Winners ==
=== 2016 ===
Category	Winner
UK Esports Player of the Year	Callum “Swanny” Swan
Esports Console Player of the Year	Seth “Scump” Abner
Esports PC Player of the Year	Marcelo “coldzera” David
Esports Rookie of the Year	Amer “Miracle” al-Barkawi
Esports Coverage Website of the Year	theScore Esports
Esports Team of the Year	Team EnVyUs
Esports Personality of the Year	Gabriel “FalleN” Toledo
Streamer of the Year	Michael “Imaqtpie” Santana
Streaming Platform of the Year	Twitch
Esports Journalist of the Year	Richard Lewis
Esports Game of the Year	Counter-Strike: Global Offensive
New Esports Game of the Year	Overwatch
Esports Publisher of the Year	Valve Corporation
Esports Photographer of the Year	Robert Paul
Esports Commercial Partner of the Year	Monster Energy
Hardware Provider of the Year	SCUF
Esports Broadcaster of the Year	Auguste “Semmler” Massonnat
Esports Live Event of the Year	The International 2016

=== 2017 ===
Category	Winner
UK Esports Player of the Year	Spencer "Gorilla" Ealing
Esports Console Player of the Year	Matthew "FormaL" Piper
Esports PC Player of the Year	Amer "Miracle-" Al-Barqawi
Esports Rookie of the Year (Console)	Victor "Punk" Woodley
Esports Rookie of the Year (PC)	Abay "HObbit" Khassenov
Esports Personality of the Year	Eefje '"Sjokz" Depoortere
Esports Play of the Year	Matthew "FormaL" Piper
Esports Unsung Hero of the Year	Megan "RheingoldRiver" Cutrofello
Esports Game of the Year	Counter-Strike: Global Offensive
Esports Team of the Year	OpTic Gaming
Streamer of the Year	Dr Disrespect
Streaming Platform of the Year	Twitch
Esports Coverage Website of the Year	ESPN
Esports Breakthrough Game of the Year	PUBG
Esports Publisher of the Year	Riot Games
Esports Commercial Partner of the Year	G Fuel
Esports Hardware Provider of the Year	Intel
Esports Live Event of the Year	2017 League of Legends World Championship
Esports Photographer of the Year	Joe Brady
Esports Videographer of the Year	Davis "OpTic Hitch" Edwards
Esports Journalist of the Year	Duncan "Thorin" Shields
Esports Broadcaster of the Year	Alex "Machine" Richardson

=== 2018 ===
Category	Winner
UK Esports Player of the Year	Spencer "Gorilla" Ealing
Esports Console Player of the Year	Mossad "MSdossary" Aldossary
Esports PC Player of the Year	Oleksandr "s1mple" Kostyliev
Esports Rookie of the Year (Console)	Kenny Williams
Esports Rookie of the Year (PC)	Gabriel "Bwipo" Rau
Esports Personality of the Year	Tyler "Ninja" Blevins
Esports Play of the Year	Matthew "FormaL" Piper
Esports Unsung Hero of the Year	Milos "Faceit Mikey" Nedeljkovic
Esports Game of the Year	Overwatch
Esports Team of the Year	Astralis (CS:GO)
Esports Organisation of the Year	Cloud9
Esports Breakthrough Game of the Year	Fortnite
Esports Live Event of the Year	2018 Overwatch League Grand Finals
Esports Publisher of the Year	Blizzard Entertainment
Streamer of the Year	Tyler "Ninja" Blevins
Streaming Platform of the Year	Twitch
Esports Supporting Agency of the Year	Evolved Talent Agency
Esports Coverage Website of the Year	ESPN
Esports Commercial Partner of the Year	Intel
Esports Hardware Provider of the Year	Nvidia
Esports Photographer of the Year	Helena Kristiansson
Esports Videographer of the Year	Davis "OpTic Hitch" Edwards
Esports Journalist of the Year	Jacob Wolf
Esports Broadcaster of the Year	Clint "Maven" Evans

=== 2019 ===
Category	Winner
Esports Console Player of the Year	Dominique "SonicFox" McLean
Esports PC Player of the Year	Kyle "Bugha" Giersdorf
Esports Rookie of the Year (Console)	Chris "Simp" Lehr
Esports Rookie of the Year (PC)	Kyle "Bugha" Giersdorf
Esports Personality of the Year	Matthew "Nadeshot" Haag
Esports Play of the Year	Thiago "S3xyCake" Reis
Esports Cosplayer of the Year	Littlejam
Esports Panel's Choice Award	Ryan Thompson
Esports Coach of the Year	Danny "zonic" Sørensen
Esports Game of the Year	league of Legends
Esports Team of the Year	G2 Esports (League of Legends)
Esports Organisation of the Year	Team Liquid
Esports Breakthrough Game of the Year	Super Smash Bros. Ultimate
Esports Live Event of the Year	2019 League of Legends World Championship
Esports Publisher of the Year	Riot Games
Streamer of the Year	Dr Disrespect
Esports Supporting Agency of the Year	Loaded
Esports Coverage Website of the Year	Dexerto
Esports Commercial Partner of the Year	HyperX
Esports Hardware Provider of the Year	Intel
Esports Photographer of the Year	Stephani Lindgren
Esports Videographer of the Year	Logan Dodson
Esports Journalist of the Year	Richard Lewis
Esports Caster of the Year	Henry "HenryG" Greer
Esports Host of the Year	Alex "Goldenboy" Mendez

=== 2020 ===
Category	Winner
Esports Console Player of the Year	Anthony "Shotzzy" Cuevas-Castro
Esports PC Player of the Year	Michał "Nisha" Jankowski
Esports Mobile Player of the Year	Made Bagas "Zuxxy" Pramudita
Esports Rookie of the Year (Console)	Anthony "Shotzzy" Cuevas-Castro
Esports Rookie of the Year (PC)	Ryu "Keria" Min-seok
Esports Personality of the Year	Carlos "ocelote" Rodríguez
Esports Coach of the Year	Lee "Heen" Seung-Gon
Esports Play of the Year	İsmailcan "XANTARES" Dörtkardeş
Esports Cosplayer of the Year	Glory Lamothe
Esports Panel's Choice Award	Michal Slowinski & Steve Dudenhoefer
Esports Content Creator of the Year	UpUpDownDown
Esports Game of the Year	League of Legends
Esports Mobile Game of the Year	Free Fire
Esports Organisation of the Year	G2 Esports
Esports Team of the Year	Team Secret (Dota 2)
Esports Content Team of the Year	League of Legends European Championship
Esports Creative Team of the Year	Paper Crowns
Esports Creative Piece of the Year	League of Legends Warriors Season Opening
Esports Content Series of the Year	Eavesdrop Podcast
Esports Publisher of the Year	Riot Games
Streamer of the Year	Ibai Llanos
Esports Supporting Agency of the Year	Character Select Agency
Esports Coverage Website of the Year	The Esports Observer
Esports Commercial Partner of the Year	Logitech
Esports Hardware Provider of the Year	Elgato
Esports Photographer of the Year	Rich Lock
Esports Videographer of the Year	Logan Dodson
Esports Journalist of the Year	Emily Rand
Esports Analyst of the Year	Chad "SPUNJ" Burchill
Esports Host of the Year	Eefje "Sjokz" Depoortere
Esports Colour Caster of the Year	Michael "KiXSTAr" Stockley
Esports Play by Play Caster of the Year	Clayton "CaptainFlowers" Raines
Esports Collegiate Award	Tyrelle Appleton

==== Lifetime Achievement 2020 recipients ====
- Daigo Umehara
- Craig “Torbull” Levine
- Richard Lewis
- Michael Sepso
- Lim “Boxer” Yo-hwan
- Johnathan “Fatal1ty” Wendel

=== 2021 ===
Category	Winner
Esports Controller Player of the Year	Chris "Simp" Lehr
Esports PC Player of the Year	Oleksandr "s1mple" Kostyliev
Esports Mobile Player of the Year	Zhu "paraboy" Bocheng
Esports Rookie of the Year (Controller)	Evan "M0nkey M00n" Rogez
Esports Rookie of the Year (PC)	Valerii "b1t" Vakhovskyi
Esports Personality of the Year	Bruno "Nobru" Goes
Esports Coach of the Year	Moon "Moon" Byung-chul
Esports Play of the Year	Jake "Virtue" Grannan
Esports Cosplayer of the Year	Peyton Cosplay
Esports Panel's Choice Award	Jas "Fizzi" Laferriere
Esports Content Creator of the Year	Ashley Kang
Esports Game of the Year	Valorant
Esports Mobile Game of the Year	Free Fire
Esports Organisation of the Year	100 Thieves
Esports Team of the Year	Atlanta FaZe (Call of Duty League)
Esports Creative Team of the Year	Alex Productions
Esports Creative of the Year	Thorsten Denk
Esports Creative Piece of the Year	No Clue | Adidas Partners with G2 Esports
Esports Creative Series of the Year	Metagame Documentary
Esports Broadcast/Production Team of the Year	Riot Games
Esports Video Production Team of the Year	G2 Esports
Esports Apparel of the Year	100 Thieves
Esports Publisher of the Year	Riot Games
Streamer of the Year	Ibai Llanos
Esports Supporting Service of the Year	Discord
Esports Coverage Platform of the Year	The Esports Observer
Esports Commercial Partner of the Year	Intel
Esports Hardware Provider of the Year	Corsair
Esports Photo of the Year	Eric Ananmalay
Esports Journalist of the Year	Kevin Hitt
Esports Analyst of the Year	Marc Robert " Caedrel" Lamont
Esports Host of the Year	Eefje "Sjokz" Depoortere
Esports Colour Caster of the Year	Chad "SPUNJ" Burchill
Esports Play by Play Caster of the Year	Miles Ross
Esports Collegiate Program of the Year	Maryville University
Esports Collegiate Ambassador of the Year	Dr. Chris "Doc" Haskell

==== Lifetime Achievement 2021 recipients ====
Sources:

- Amber Dalton
- Amy Brady
- Adam Apicella
- Michal "Carmac" Blicharz
- Stephanie "MISSHARVEY" Harvey
- Justin Wong
- Dave "Walshy" Walsh

=== 2022 ===
Category	Winner
Esports Controller Player of the Year	Matthew "FormaL" Piper
Esports PC Player of the Year	Oleksandr "s1mple" Kostyliev
Esports Mobile Player of the Year	Ceng "Order" Zehai
Esports Rookie of the Year (Controller)	Enzo "Seikoo" Grondein
Esports Rookie of the Year (PC)	Ilya “m0NESY” Osipov
Esports Personality of the Year	Matthew "Nadeshot" Haag
Esports Coach of the Year	Andrii "B1ad3" Horodenskyi
Esports Play of the Year	Russel "Twistzz" Van Dulken
Esports Cosplayer of the Year	Kinpatsu Cosplay
Esports Game of the Year	Valorant
Esports Mobile Game of the Year	PUBG Mobile
Esports Organisation of the Year	OpTic Gaming
Esports Team of the Year	LOUD (Valorant)
Esports Content Creator of the Year	Juan Manuel "Hungrybox" DeBiedma
Esports Content Group of the Year	S8UL Esports
Esports Creative of the Year	Christian Skimmeland
Esports Creative Team of the Year	LOUD
Esports Creative Piece of the Year	The Bellhop | Gucci Gaming Academy
Esports Content Series of the Year	Players
Esports Broadcast/Production Team of the Year	Riot Games
Esports Apparel of the Year	100 Thieves
Esports Publisher of the Year	Riot Games
Streamer of the Year	Ibai Llanos
Esports Supporting Service of the Year	Esports Engine
Esports Coverage Platform of the Year	Dexerto
Esports Commercial Partner of the Year	Verizon
Esports Hardware Provider of the Year	Logitech G
Esports Photo of the Year	Colin Young-Wolff
Esports Journalist of the Year	Ashley Kang
Esports Desk Analyst of the Year	Jessica "JessGOAT" Bolden
Esports Host of the Year	James "Dash" Patterson
Esports Colour Caster of the Year	Andy "Bravo" Dudynsky
Esports Play by Play Caster of the Year	Lauren "Pansy" Scott
Esports Collegiate Program of the Year	University of Hawaiʻi
Esports Collegiate Ambassador of the Year	Christine Fang

==== Lifetime Achievement 2022 recipients ====
Sources:

- Jason Lake
- Alexander Garfield
- Morgan Romine
- Daniel "OGRE1" Ryan
- Tom "OGRE2" Ryan
- Emil "HeatoN" Christensen
- Dennis "Thresh" Fong

=== 2023 ===
Category	Winner
Esports Controller Player of the Year	Paco “HyDra” Rusiewiez
Esports PC Player of the Year	Lee “Faker” Sang-hyeok
Esports Mobile Player of the Year	Mohamed “Mohamed Light” Tarek
Esports Breakthrough Player of the Year	Max “Demon1” Mazanov
Esports Personality of the Year	Disguised Toast
Esports Coach of the Year	Christine “potter” Chi
Esports Play of the Year	Ilya “m0NESY” Osipov
Esports Cosplayer of the Year	Akemikun
Esports Game of the Year	Valorant
Esports Mobile Game of the Year	Mobile Legends: Bang Bang
Esports Organisation of the Year	Team Vitality
Esports Team of the Year	T1 (League of Legends)
Esports Content Creator of the Year	S8UL Esports
Esports Content of the Year	Faker: A Decade Of Greatness
Esports Creative of the Year	Seso
Esports Creative Team of the Year	Paper Crowns
Esports Broadcast/Production Team of the Year	ESL FACEIT Group
Esports Publisher of the Year	Riot Games
Streamer of the Year	RiversGG
Esports Supporting Service of the Year	Prodigy Agency
Esports Coverage Platform of the Year	Esports Charts
Esports Commercial Partner of the Year	GUCCI
Esports Hardware Piece of the Year	Elgato Stream Deck MK.2
Esports Journalist of the Year	Richard Lewis
Esports Desk Analyst of the Year	Mimi “aEvilCat” Wermcrantz
Esports Host of the Year	Caleb “WavePunk” Simmons
Esports Colour Caster of the Year	Dan Gaskin
Esports Play by Play Caster of the Year	Mitch “Uber” Leslie

==== Lifetime Achievement 2023 recipients ====
- Chris Puckett
- Ian "Crimsix" Porter
- Marc Merrill
- Lee "Flash" Young Ho
- Manuel "Grubby" Schenkhuizen
- Shane "rapha" Hendrixson
- Victor "Nazgul" Goossens
- Michael "Odee" O'Dell

=== 2024 ===
Category	Winner
Esports Controller Player of the Year	Anthony "Shotzzy" Cuevas-Castro
Esports PC Player of the Year	Lee “Faker” Sang-hyeok
Esports Breakthrough Player of the Year	Stanislav "Malr1ne" Potorak
Esports Sim Racer of the Year	Sebastian Job
Esports Play of the Year	Alexander “jawgemo” Mor
Esports Personality of the Year	Seth "Scump" Abner
Esports Coach of the Year	Kim "Kim" Jung-su
Esports Community Leader of the Year	Marc Robert "Caedrel" Lamont
Esports Game of the Year	Valorant
Esports Mobile Game of the Year	Mobile Legends: Bang Bang
Esports Breakthrough Game of the Year	Teamfight Tactics
Esports Organisation of the Year	Team Falcons
Esports Team of the Year	T1 (League of Legends)
Esports Content Creator of the Year	Naman "Mortal" Mathur
Esports Content Group of the Year	S8UL Esports
Esports Content of the Year	GODS ft. NewJeans (뉴진스) (Official Music Video) | Worlds 2023 Anthem - League of Legends
Esports Creative of the Year	Tiago "Liquid Enigma" Paixao
Esports Creative Team of the Year	Team Liquid
Esports Broadcast/Production Team of the Year	ESL FACEIT Group
Esports Publisher of the Year	Riot Games
Streamer of the Year	RiversGG
Esports Supporting Service of the Year	Blitz.GG
Esports Content & Coverage Platform of the Year	Liquipedia
Esports Live Event of the Year	2023 League of Legends World Championship
Esports Commercial Partner of the Year	Red Bull
Esports Analyst of the Year	Jacob "Pimp" Winneche
Esports Host of the Year	Chris Puckett
Esports Colour Caster of the Year	Chad "SPUNJ" Burchill
Esports Play by Play Caster of the Year	Brandon "BSmith" Smith
Esports Panel's Choice Award	Corey Dunn
Lifetime Achievement in Esports	Jens Hilgers

=== Decade Awards ===
Category	Winner
Esports Game of the Decade	League of Legends
Esports Personality of the Decade	Matthew "Nadeshot" Haag
Streamer of the Decade	Félix "xQc" Lengyel
Esports Organisation of the Decade	Team Liquid
Esports Team of the Decade	T1 (League of Legends)
Esports PC Player of the Decade	Lee “Faker” Sang-hyeok
Esports Controller Player of the Decade	Anthony "Shotzzy" Cuevas-Castro
Esports Breakthrough Player of the Decade	Mathieu "ZywOo" Herbaut
Esports Coach of the Decade	Kim "kkOma" Jeong-gyun
Esports On-Air Talent of the Decade	Eefje "Sjokz" Depoortere
Esports Live Event of the Decade	2017 League of Legends World Championship
Esports Publisher of the Decade	Riot Games
Esports Commercial Partner of the Decade	Intel
Esports Content & Coverage Platform of the Decade	Liquipedia

=== 2025 ===
Category	Winner
Esports Commercial Partner of the Year	Red Bull
Esports Supporting Service of the Year	Prodigy Agency
Esports Creative Campaign of the Year	Team Liquid 25 Year Anniversary Campaign
Esports Supporting Platform of the Year	Liquipedia
Esports Content Group of the Year	S8UL Esports
Esports Content Creator of the Year	Nicholas "Jynxzi" Stewart
Esports Publisher of the Year	Riot Games
Esports Host of the Year	Laure "Bulii" Valee
Esports Colour Caster of the Year	Andrew "Vedius" Day
Esports Play by Play Caster of the Year	Clayton "CaptainFlowers" Raines
Esports Analyst of the Year	Mimi "aEvilcat" Wermcrantz
Esports Personality of the Year	Animesh "8Bit Thug" Agarwal
Streamer of the Year	Darren "IShowSpeed" Watkins Jr.
Esports Game of the Year	League of Legends
Esports Mobile Game of the Year	PUBG Mobile
Esports PC Player of the Year	Mathieu "ZywOo" Herbaut
Esports Controller Player of the Year	Zeng "Xiao Hai" Zhuojun
Esports Coach of the Year	Kim "Kim" Jung-su
Esports Breakthrough Player of the Year	Mason "Mercules" Ramsey
Esports Team of the Year	Team Vitality (Counter-Strike 2)
Esports Organisation of the Year	Team Falcons

==== Lifetime Achievement 2025 recipient ====
- Tom Cannon and Tony Cannon
- Steve Arhancet
- Dan "Artosis" Stemkoski and Nicolas "Tasteless" Plott
- Matthew "FormaL" Piper
- Johan "N0tail" Sundstein
- Peter "dupreeh" Rasmussen

=== 2026 ===
Category	Winner
Esports Game of the Year	Counter-Strike 2
Esports Mobile Game of the Year	Mobile Legends: Bang Bang
Esports Personality of the Year	Marc “Caedrel” Robert Lamont
Streamer of the Year	Darren “iShowSpeed” Watkins Jr
Esports Content Group of the Year	Gentle Mates
Esports Content Creator of the Year	Nicholas “Jynxzi” Stewart
Esports Commercial Partner of the Year	Razer
Esports Tournament Organizer of the Year	BLAST
Esports Supporting Service of the Year	ESG Law
Esports Breakthrough Player of the Year	Jaime “Craime” Bustos
Esports Team of the Year	OpTic Texas (Call of Duty)
Esports PC Player of the Year	Mathieu “ZywOo” Herbaut
Esports Controller Player of the Year	Brandon “Dashy” Otell
Esports Organization of the Year	Team Vitality
Esports Coach of the Year	Clement “Puppey” Ivanov
Esports Play-by-Play Caster of the Year	Alex “Machine” Richardson
Esports Colour Caster of the Year	Daniel “Gaskin” Gaskin
Esports Host of the Year	Iain Chambers
Esports Analyst of the Year	Anthony “NAMELESS” Wheeler
Panel’s Choice Award	Austin “Easy Mac” O’Neil
EWC Player’s Choice Award	Lee “Faker” Sang-hyeok
Esports Play of the Year	William “Spoit” Löfstedt

==== Lifetime Achievement 2026 recipient ====
- Damon “Karma” Barlow
- Juan “Hungrybox” Debiedma
- Gabriel “Fallen” Toledo
- Alex Muller
- John Nelson
- Paul Kent

== Controversies and criticism ==
During the 2018 ceremony, YouTuber Deji Olatunji, the younger brother of KSI, mistakenly announced Epic Games as the winner of Esports Publisher of the Year. Moments later, he revealed it had been a joke and corrected himself, announcing Blizzard Entertainment as the actual winner. The incident drew criticism from attendees and viewers who considered it unprofessional and disrespectful.

In 2024, the three-year partnership announcement between Esports Awards and the Esports World Cup Foundation provoked significant backlash from the esports community. Several commentators and industry figures expressed concern over the new partnership. Some members of the Esports Awards panel stepped down following the announcement. During the same period, Silviu Stroie, the CEO of PGL Esports announced they were withdrawing from the Esports Awards after being nominated for the Broadcast/Production Team of the Year award, stating that the event “has lost its credibility.”

== See also ==
- The Game Awards
- Golden Joystick Awards
