= Clem (gamer) =

French professional StarCraft II player

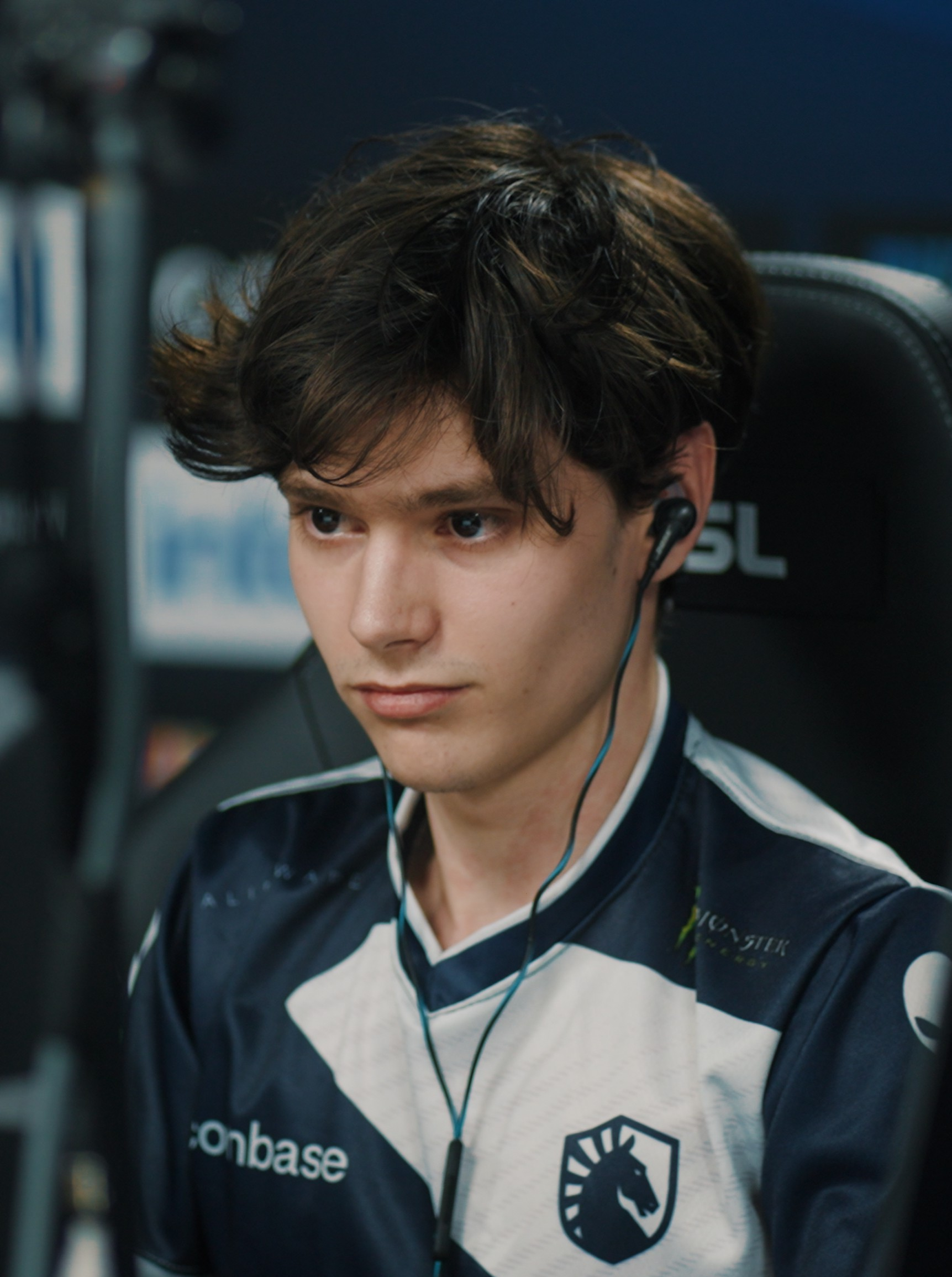
- Clem in 2023

Personal information
- Name: Clément Desplanches
- Born: April 8, 2002 (age 24); Nice, France

Current team
- Team: Team Liquid
- Game(s): StarCraft II, Stormgate

Career information
- Playing career: 2012–present

Career highlights and awards
- Esports World Cup 2024 champion; 8 Premier-level tournament titles; French Esports Player of the Year 2024 (L'Équipe)

Clément "Clem" Desplanches (born April 8, 2002, in Nice, France) is a French professional StarCraft II player competing for Team Liquid. In 2024, he was named Esports Player of the Year by L'Équipe, France's leading national sports newspaper, following his victory at the Esports World Cup 2024 StarCraft II tournament, where he earned $400,000 in prize money by defeating Serral 5–0 in the grand final.

Clément Desplanches was the subject of a biographical profile by Le Monde, France's newspaper of record, in February 2021, and is regarded as one of the most successful non-Korean players in the history of competitive StarCraft II. He plays the Terran race and is the only Terran foreigner to have won more than two individual Premier-level tournaments, with eight titles including a world championship.

== Early life ==
Clément Desplanches was born on April 8, 2002, in Nice, in the south of France. He began playing StarCraft II at around the age of 10, introduced to the game by his father Xavier, himself a strategy game enthusiast. Within six months of first playing, Clem had already reached the Master rank, placing him in approximately the top 2% of all players worldwide—a result his father described as "quite surprising at the time."

He has described his attraction to StarCraft II in terms of individual responsibility: "I like to put my fate in my own hands and say: if I lose, it's because I played badly; if I win, it's because I played well. I like the one-on-one."

Clem pursued his secondary education alongside his early esports career. He completed his baccalauréat in the ES (Economics and Social) stream through the French distance-learning centre (CNED) while competing at an international level, before transitioning to full-time play in 2020.

== Career ==
=== Amateur career (2012–2019) ===
Clem began competing in French local and regional LAN events from an early age, participating in tournaments such as PxL-Lan. He joined several amateur esports organisations successively during this period, representing teams including Punchline, OrKs eSports, Dead Pixels, Exceed Esports, and Infinity Gaming.

A notable early milestone came in April 2016 when, at only 14 years old, Clem qualified for the DreamHack Open: Tours, which also served as the 2016 WCS Spring Circuit Championship qualifier. He defeated established players including former WCS Premier participants Tefel, Miniraser, and Happy to secure a qualifying spot. However, as WCS rules at the time prohibited players under 16 from participating, Clem was disqualified and forfeited his spot in the main event. He continued competing on the European amateur circuit through 2016–2019, steadily building a reputation as one of the most promising young Terran players in Europe.

=== Joining Team Liquid and professional breakthrough (2020) ===
On February 21, 2020, Clem was recruited by Team Liquid, one of the most prestigious esports organisations in the world. This marked the start of his full-time professional career, following the completion of his secondary education.

His debut season quickly demonstrated his potential. He placed third at the DreamHack SC2 Masters 2020 Summer: Europe, then runner-up at the Fall edition, advancing further in the standings with each successive event. On November 8, 2020, Clem won his first Premier-level tournament, defeating Riccardo "Reynor" Romiti 4–2 in the grand final of the DreamHack SC2 Masters 2020 Winter: Europe.

=== European dominance (2021–2022) ===
Through 2021 and 2022, Clem cemented his position as the dominant force in European StarCraft II. He claimed first place at the DreamHack SC2 Masters 2021 Summer: Europe (June 2021), earning $10,750, then won the DreamHack SC2 Masters 2021 Fall: Europe (August 2021), also earning $10,750—defeating Serral 4–2 in the grand final.

In 2022 he added two further European titles: the DreamHack SC2 Masters 2022 Valencia: Europe (May 2022) and the DreamHack SC2 Masters 2022 Atlanta: Europe (October 2022), each earning him $16,000 in first-place prize money.

Despite this consistent European dominance, Clem struggled to replicate these results at global events against top Korean players—particularly at IEM Katowice.

=== First international breakthrough (2023) ===
In December 2023, Clem won the ESL SC2 Masters 2023 Winter global finals at DreamHack Atlanta, taking home $15,000 in first-place prize money from the $75,000 prize pool. The event featured 10 of the 11 highest-rated players in the world, most of them Korean, and Clem was not widely expected to advance deep. He defeated Dark, Solar, and Serral on his path to the final, then beat Dark again 4–1 in the grand final.

In a post-tournament interview with Blix.gg, Clem described the moment: "I just remembered every past tournament where I lost, and I was like, 'Okay, now it's my time. Now it's my tournament. Now it's finally my time to lift the trophy.'" He further reflected that the win, after eleven years in the game, was "incredible—I feel like I'm dreaming, you know?"

=== World Championship (2024) ===
In May 2024, Clem claimed first place at the ESL SC2 Masters 2024 Spring: Europe, defeating MaxPax 4–3 in the final to earn $15,000 in first-place prize money from the $150,000 regional prize pool.

The defining moment of his career came on August 18, 2024, when Clem won the Esports World Cup 2024 StarCraft II tournament in Riyadh, Saudi Arabia, earning $400,000 in first-place prize money from the $1,000,000 total prize pool. In the upper bracket he defeated Classic 3–0, Reynor 3–2, and Serral 3–0, before eliminating herO 4–0 in the semifinal and sweeping Serral 5–0 in the grand final—finishing the tournament with an 18–2 map record and a combined 8–0 map score against Serral.

Clem described the win on social media as "a dream come true." He was subsequently named Esportif français de l'année (French Esports Player of the Year) for 2024 by sports newspaper L'Équipe.

=== HomeStory Cup XXVIII and continued competition (2025–2026) ===
Clem returned as defending world champion at the Esports World Cup 2025, where he was eliminated in the quarterfinals by Classic. On June 7, 2025, he won the Bellum Gens Elite Stara Zagora 2025 tournament, defeating Serral 4–3 in the final.

On February 1, 2026, Clem won his first HomeStory Cup title, claiming the 28th edition of the long-running invitational held in Krefeld, Germany ($10,000 prize pool). He posted a 22–2 win–loss record throughout the event, defeating ShoWTimE 3–1 in the grand final. The win was notable given that Clem had previously entered the event approximately ten times without winning: "I've played a lot of HomeStory Cups before, maybe 10 or something, and I never won any [...] You've won one of everything else, so it's like, 'Where's HomeStory Cup?'"

== Playing style ==
Clem is primarily known as a Terran player and is regarded as one of the fastest and most mechanically skilled players in StarCraft II history. His style is characterised by aggressive multitasking, relentless pressure, and superior micro-management—the precise control of individual units in combat. His Terran vs. Zerg (TvZ) matchup is considered among the best in the world.

Clem is known for a wide and varied repertoire of build orders, adapting his strategy from game to game. He has attributed his ability to adapt quickly to balance patches to the alignment between the game's demands and his natural style: "I think that the recent patch was pretty good for my style."

Regarding matchup differences, Clem has explained: "Terran against Protoss is definitely way more build-order-decided than, let's say, TvZ. Against Zerg, it's like I can pretty much do the same micro builds over and over again, and it's usually the better player, mechanically and in the longer game, that wins."

In late 2024, Clem began experimenting with the Protoss race in matches against Terran opponents. He has noted that picking up Protoss allows him to "drag the other Terrans into the style of game he likes to play," given that Terran vs. Terran had historically been his weakest matchup.

He also competes in Stormgate, a real-time strategy title developed by former Blizzard Entertainment developers.

== Main results ==
Main results
Date	Tournament	Place	Score	Final opponent
12 July 2020	DH SC2 Masters 2020 Summer: Europe	Bronze	1–3	Reynor
13 September 2020	DH SC2 Masters 2020 Fall: Europe	Silver	3–4	Reynor
20 September 2020	DH SC2 Masters 2020 Fall: Season Finals	Bronze	3–1	Reynor
11 October 2020	King of Battles: KB International Championship	Bronze	4–2	Maru
8 November 2020	DH SC2 Masters 2020 Winter: Europe	Gold	4–2	Reynor
15 November 2020	DH SC2 Masters 2020 Winter: Season Finals	Bronze	3–2	Stats
17 January 2021	DH SC2 Masters 2020: Last Chance 2021	Bronze	3–1	Trap
6 June 2021	DH SC2 Masters 2021 Summer: Europe	Gold	4–1	Reynor
15 August 2021	DH SC2 Masters 2021 Fall: Europe	Gold	4–2	Serral
17 October 2021	DH SC2 Masters 2021 Winter: Europe	Silver	1–4	Serral
14 November 2021	DH SC2 Masters 2021 Winter: Season Finals	Bronze	3–0	Maru
1 May 2022	King of Battles 3	Bronze	3–2	Reynor
5 May 2022	DH SC2 Masters 2022 Valencia: Europe	Gold	4–3	Reynor
24 July 2022	HomeStory Cup XXI	Silver	0–2	Serral
16 October 2022	DH SC2 Masters 2022 Atlanta: Europe	Gold	4–3	Reynor
21 May 2023	ESL SC2 Masters 2023 Summer: Europe	Bronze	2–3	Serral
6 August 2023	Gamers8 2023	Bronze	0–3	Reynor
19 November 2023	ESL SC2 Masters 2023 Winter: Europe	Silver	1–4	Serral
3 December 2023	HomeStory Cup XXIV	Silver	1–3	Serral
17 December 2023	ESL SC2 Masters 2023 Winter (Finals)	Gold	4–1	Dark
5 May 2024	ESL SC2 Masters 2024 Spring: Europe	Gold	4–3	MaxPax
18 August 2024	Esports World Cup 2024	Gold	5–0	Serral
7 June 2025	Bellum Gens Elite Stara Zagora 2025	Gold	4–3	Serral
1 February 2026	HomeStory Cup XXVIII	Gold	3–1	ShoWTimE

== Achievements and records ==
- First non-Korean foreigner to win the StarCraft II Esports World Cup
- Named French Esports Player of the Year 2024 by L'Équipe
- Total career prize earnings exceeding $862,000 (as of early 2026)
- Largest single-tournament first-place prize of $400,000 from the Esports World Cup 2024
