= Smash Brothers (disambiguation) =

Super Smash Bros. is a series of fighting video games published by Nintendo.

Smash Brothers or Smash Bros. may also refer to:

- Super Smash Bros. (video game), the first game in the Super Smash Bros. series, released for the Nintendo 64 in 1999
- The Smash Brothers, a 2013 documentary about competitive players of the Super Smash Bros. games
- Super Smash Brothers (professional wrestling), a Canadian professional wrestling tag team composed of Evil Uno and Stu Grayson
