= Ken Hoang =

American professional esports player and Survivor contestant

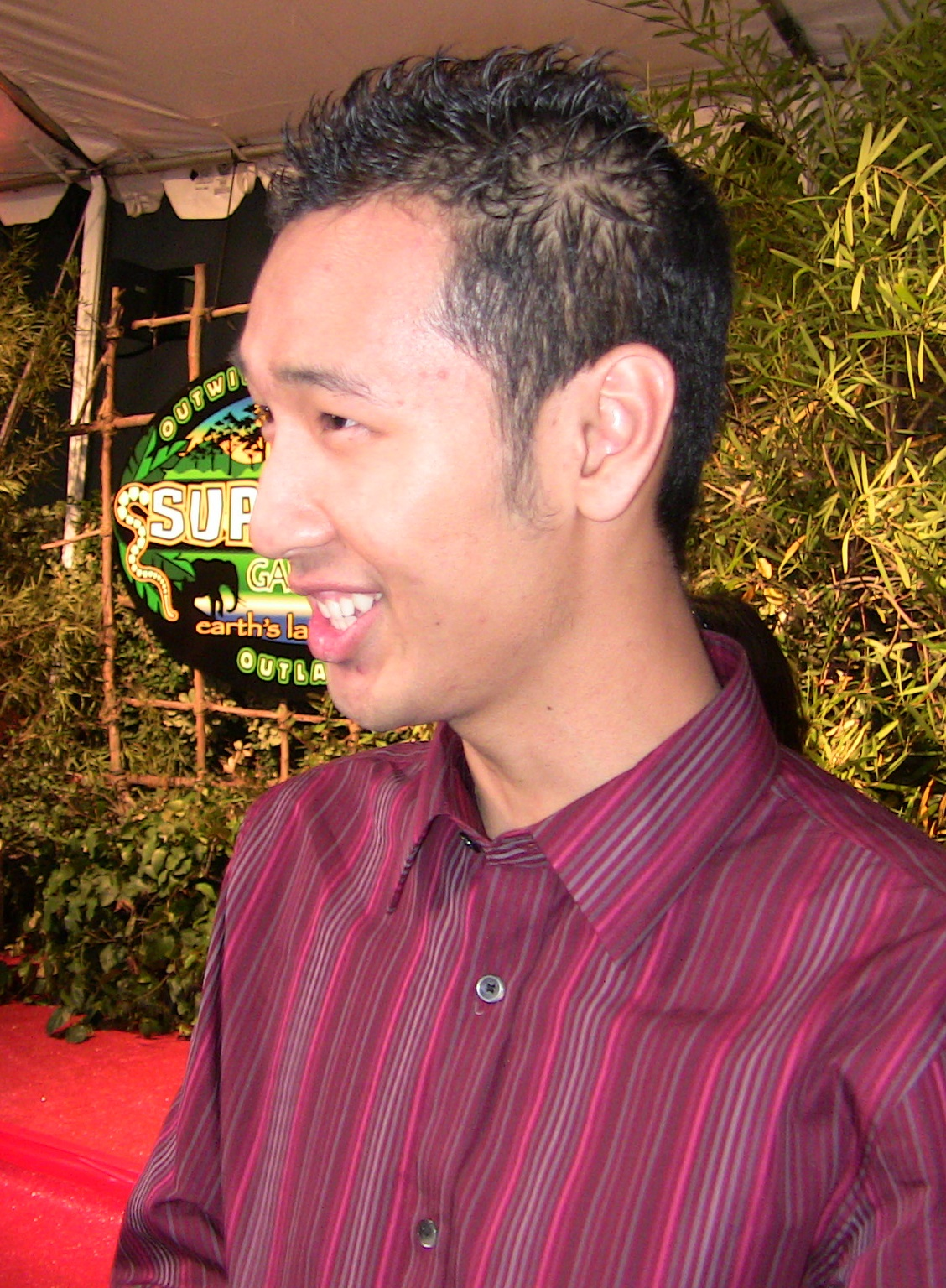
- At the Survivor finale showing, at CBS Studios, Los Angeles, California, December 14, 2008

Personal information
- Name: Ken Hoang
- Nicknames: SephirothKen; LiquidKen; The King of Smash
- Born: October 10, 1985 (age 41)

Career information
- Games: Super Smash Bros. Melee; Project M
- Playing career: 2003–2018

Team history
- 2014-2018: Team Liquid

Career highlights and awards
- (16 majors won): 7x MLG champion (2004-2006); 2x Tournament Go champion (2003); Game Over champion) 2004); MELEE-FC1 champion (2004); Gettin' Schooled 2 champion (2005); MELEE-FC3 champion (2005); Jack Garden Tournament champion (2005); Zero Challenge 2 champion (2006); EVO champion 2007

Ken Hoang (born October 10, 1985), also known as Kenny, SephirothKen, or Liquid`Ken, is an American professional Super Smash Bros. Melee player and television personality. Hoang was widely considered the most dominant Melee player in the world during the early years of the game's competitive scene in the early to mid-2000s. Hoang primarily plays Marth in Melee and is credited for pioneering several gameplay techniques integral to the game's competitive play, including the "dash dancing" movement technique and the "Ken Combo", an effective Marth combo for which he is the namesake. Hoang's dominance in the game earned him the nickname "The King of Smash".

Hoang was the 2004–2005 national champion of Major League Gaming, the 2007 international champion of Evolution Championship Series (EVO) World Finals, and was the highest ranked Super Smash Bros. Melee player in the United States, having also defeated reputable players from around the globe, including top Japanese players.

Hoang possesses the highest major tournament win-to-loss ratio of any Super Smash Bros. Melee player from 2003 to 2007. He received minor television coverage in MTV's True Life: I'm a Professional Gamer. Hoang retired in 2007, however he returned to the Melee scene in 2012, competing sporadically since. In 2014 he and fellow Melee veteran Daniel "KoreanDJ" Jung joined Team Liquid as the team's first Smash Bros. players. A 2021 list compiled by PGstats ranked Hoang as the fourth-greatest Melee player of all time.

Hoang was a contestant on Survivor: Gabon, which aired in the fall of 2008. He finished in fifth-place and was the sixth member of the jury.

== Smash Bros. career ==
Hoang started playing Super Smash Bros. when it was released for the Nintendo 64, but never competed in an organized tournament for the game, due to a lack of a widespread competitive scene at the time. When Super Smash Bros. Melee was released for the GameCube, Ken initially did not enjoy it, but the game grew on him after a period of a few months. By the time he attended his first tournament, he already built up a reputation in his town as the best Smash player. This tournament differed from most later Super Smash Bros. Melee tournaments in that matches were free-for-all matches between four players rather than a 1 vs 1 match. The other players teamed up against Hoang to eliminate him.

In 2003, he competed in his first major tournament, part of the Tournament Go (TG) series, one of the first major Melee tournament series. In this, the fourth installment of the tournament series, Hoang won the singles (1 vs 1) tournament and lost in the doubles (2 vs 2) tournament to the winners of the first two TG tournaments.

Seven months later, in August 2003, Hoang attended and won TG5. This was the first tournament where he partnered with Joel "Isai" Alvarado (otherwise known as "Malva00") for doubles in a team known as El Chocolate Diablo. Their victory in the doubles tournament started a 2 1/2-year winning streak. They won every doubles tournament they entered until MLG Chicago in July 2006, where they were defeated by Azen and Chillindude829 in the finals and received second place. However, they reclaimed their title later that year in August at MLG Orlando where they defeated Azen and Chillindude829 6–3 in the finals.

For the next two years, he continued to win nearly every competition he entered. The worst loss he ever garnered in his competitive career was in August 2004 at TG6 where he placed 9th out of approximately 128 competitors. He traveled to Japan several times and defeated top players such as Aniki, Captain Jack, Masashi, Bombsoldier, Korius, and Mikael in the summer of 2005 and 2006.

Ken retired from competitive play in 2008. Although retired, he was regarded as one of the top players long after his departure from the tournament scene. In September 2006, Ken was nominated in "The Dangerous Five" as one of "The World's Most Dangerous Gamers" by Electronic Gaming Monthly, in which he was called "The Duper" for his fast, smart, and aggressive play.

Hoang returned to the game in 2012 after a five-year hiatus and placed 33rd in Kings of Cali. He has since attended several additional tournaments, including EVO 2013, where he placed 49th out of 696 participants, then the Smash tournament with the largest number of entrants in history.

In 2013, Hoang's career was profiled in the documentary series The Smash Brothers. At the end of the year, Ken was ranked in the final spot at 100th in Melee it on Me's 2013 SSBMRank listing of the best Melee players.

On March 18, 2014, Team Liquid announced that Hoang and KDJ would be joining their new Super Smash Bros. team. Ken rose to 58th in the 2014 SSBMRank.

At Apex 2015 Ken finished 81st. At Apex he also played PC Chris in a Salty Suite exhibition match and lost 3–2.

At EVO 2015 Ken finished 13th, his highest placing at a major since Super Champ Combo in 2007.

== Survivor ==
In August 2008 it was announced that Hoang would be appearing on Survivor: Gabon, on the American television network CBS. He stated that he believed he was the underdog but hoped that it would garner him popular support.

Hoang was chosen to join the Fang tribe in the first episode when Danny "GC" Brown picked him. Fang was weaker than the opposing Kota tribe in challenges, losing five of the first six immunity challenges, and Hoang was in danger of elimination several times during the pre-merge stage of the game. He formed an early bond with fellow Fang castaway Michelle Chase, who ended up being the first person voted off. During the second Tribal Council, he was a target for elimination by Gillian Larson, but was spared as the rest of the tribe saw Larson as the weaker player. Hoang won the first immunity challenge for Fang, in which his puzzle-solving skills were pitted against physics teacher Bob Crowley of the Kota tribe. Though Kota was in the lead at the end of the first section of the challenge, which allowed Crowley a head start in solving his puzzle, Hoang solved the puzzle first and saved his tribe from Tribal Council.

Hoang made the merge and was in the merged tribe, named Nobag, a name that he coined himself. He wanted to seem like a weaker player, when in reality, he was the mastermind of some of the most important votes. He was the fifth-place finisher, and sixth member of the jury. In the Final Tribal Council, he voted for Susie Smith, who placed second behind Crowley, in the vote for Sole Survivor.

== Personal life ==
Hoang was born on October 10, 1985. Hoang's family is Vietnamese. Ken attended California State University, Long Beach, where he completed a Bachelor of Fine Arts degree in Illustration. He credits his earnings from playing Super Smash Bros Melee for financing him through college.
