= Survivor: Gabon =

- Season 17
- Region 1 DVD cover
- Presented by: Jeff Probst
- No. of days: 39
- No. of castaways: 18
- Winner: Robert "Bob" Crowley
- Runner-up: Susie Smith
- Location: Wonga-Wongue Presidential Reserve, Estuaire, Gabon
- Sprint Player of the Season: Robert "Bob" Crowley
- No. of episodes: 14

Release
- Original network: CBS
- Original release: September 25 – December 14, 2008

Additional information
- Filming dates: June 23 – July 31, 2008

Season chronology
- ← Previous; Micronesia Next → Tocantins — The Brazilian Highlands

Survivor: Gabon — Earth's Last Eden (commonly referred to as Survivor: Gabon) is the seventeenth season of the American CBS competitive reality television series Survivor. The premiere aired September 25, 2008, with the first two episodes screened back-to-back. Survivor: Gabon began filming in late June.

The winner was 57-year-old Robert "Bob" Crowley, a high school physics teacher from Maine. He defeated Susie Smith and Jessica "Sugar" Kiper in a 4–3–0 vote at the live finale to take the million dollar prize. In addition, Bob won the $100,000 "Sprint Survivor of the Season" award, beating out Sugar and Matty Whitmore, who were next highest in the popular vote. Crowley is the oldest survivor winner to date, by both birthday and age at victory.

== Format ==
Survivor is a reality television show based on the Swedish show Expedition Robinson, created by Mark Burnett and Charlie Parsons. The series follows a number of participants isolated in a remote location, where they must provide food, fire, and shelter. One participant is removed from the series by majority vote every three days, with challenges held to give a reward (ranging from living- and food-related prizes to a car) and immunity from being voted out of the series. The last remaining player receives a prize of $1,000,000.

== Contestants ==
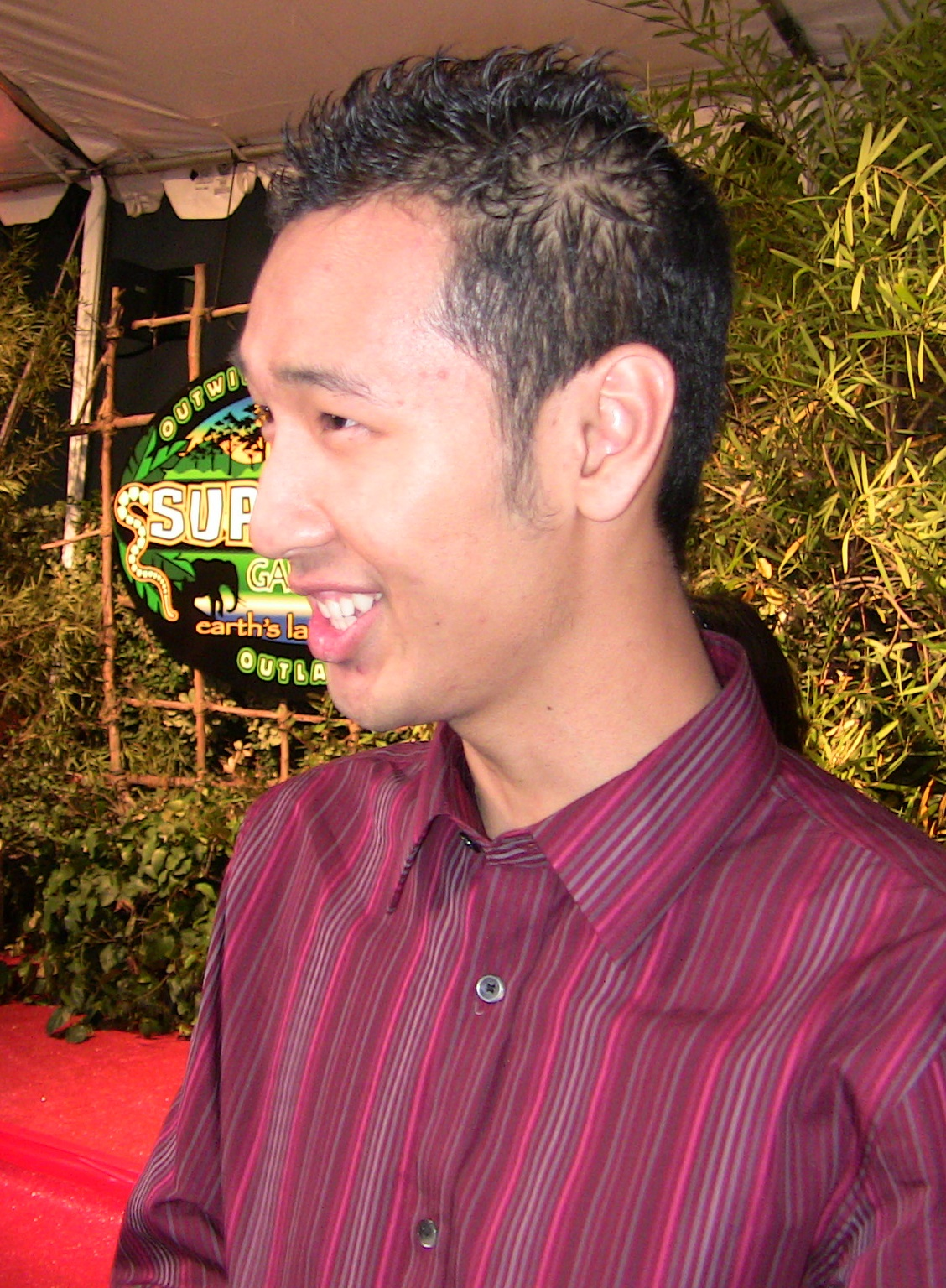
Ken Hoang

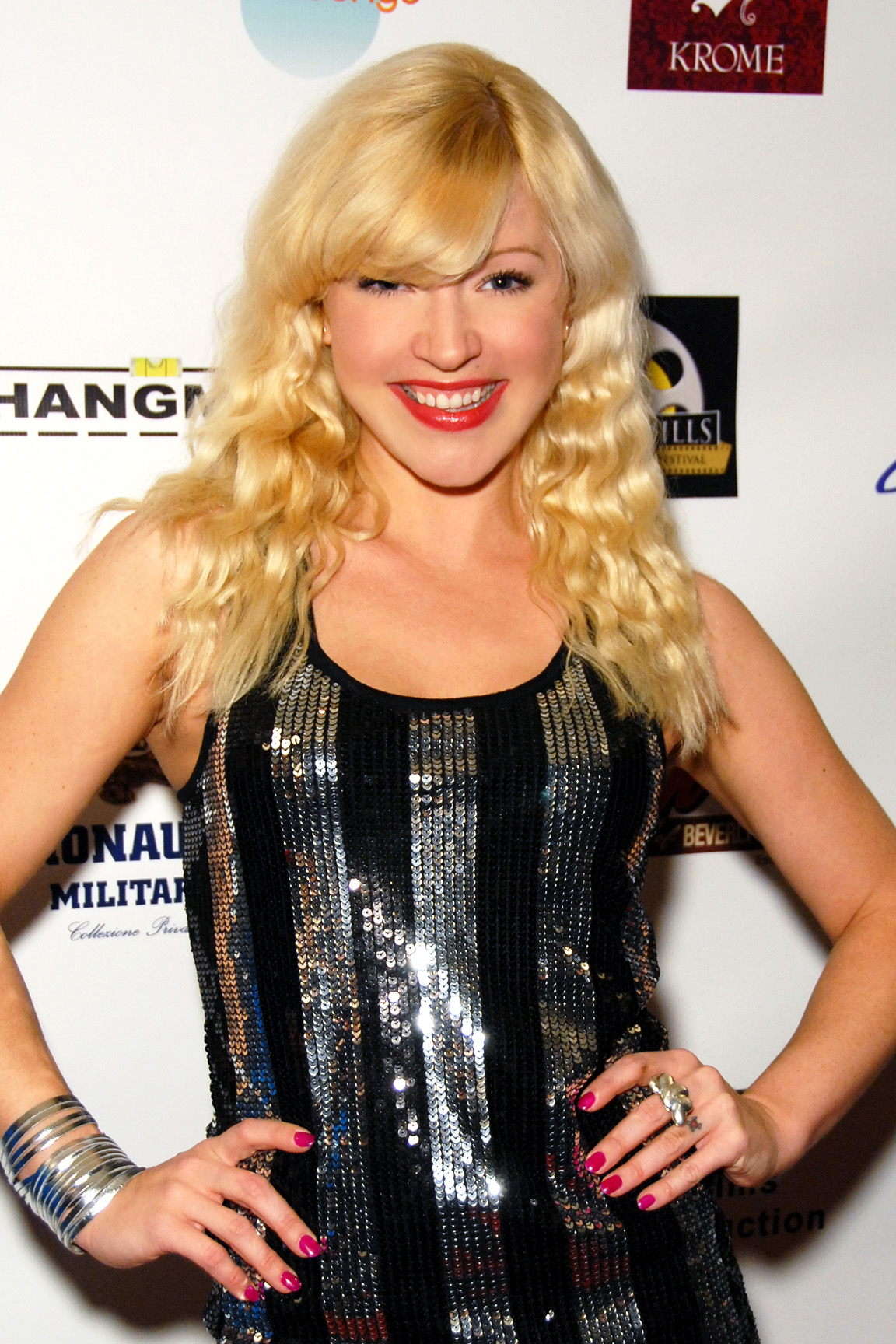
Jessica "Sugar" Kiper

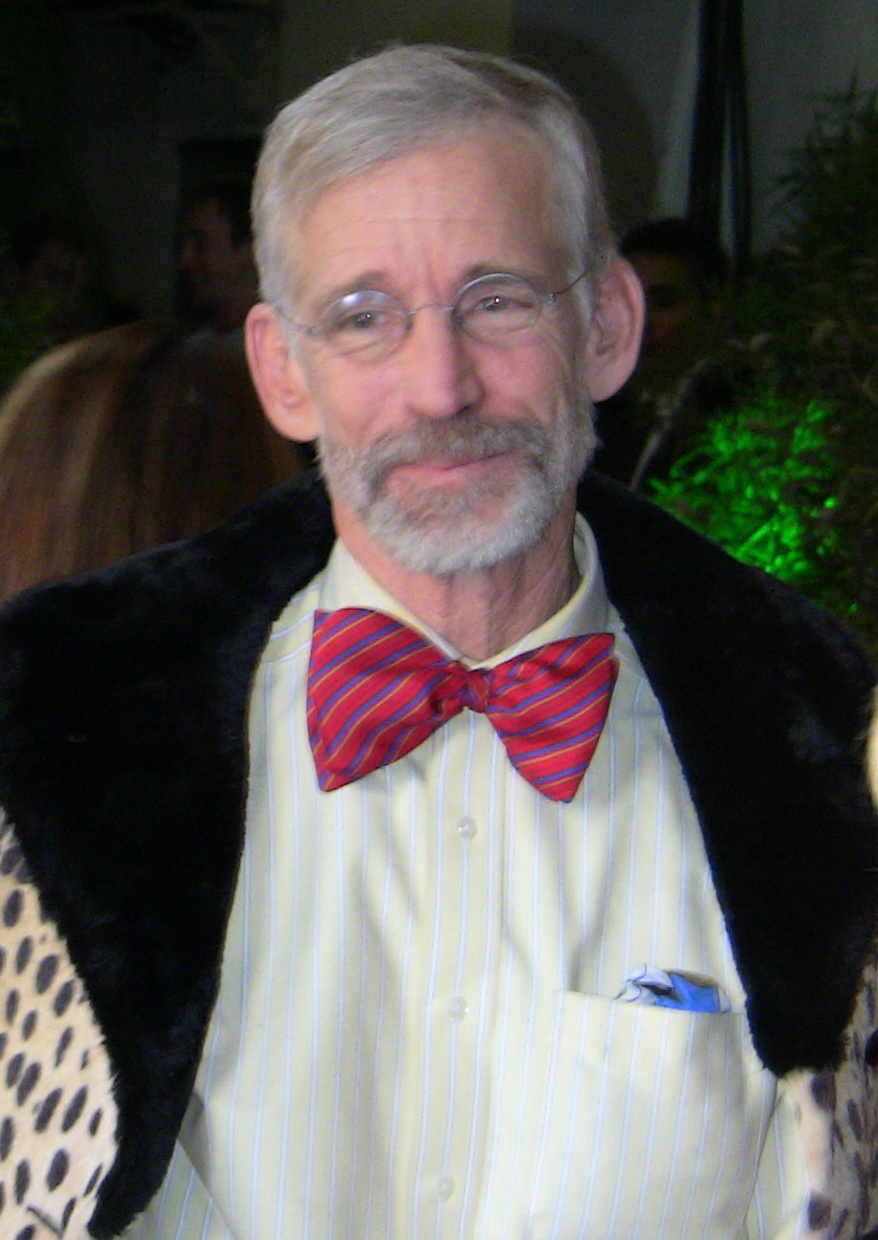
Robert "Bob" Crowley

This season started with 18 people divided into two tribes, Fang and Kota, named after ethnic groups in Gabon through a schoolyard pick. Former Dallas Cowboys head coach Jimmy Johnson was initially cast for this season, but was forced to drop out for medical reasons; he was replaced by eventual winner Bob Crowley. Johnson went on to compete on Survivor: Nicaragua. Notable contestants from this season include former 2004 Olympic gold medalist Crystal Cox; professional gamer Ken Hoang; and Matty Whitmore, the grandson of actor James Whitmore.

List of Survivor: Gabon - Earth’s Last Eden contestants
Contestant	Age	From	Tribe				Finish	
Contestant	Age	From	Original	First switch	Second switch	Merged	Placement	Day
Michelle Chase	24	Los Angeles, California	Fang				1st voted out	Day 3
Gillian Larson	61	Temecula, California	Fang				2nd voted out	Day 6
Paloma Soto-Castillo	23	Downey, California	Kota				3rd voted out	Day 9
Jacquie Berg	25	Santa Barbara, California	Kota	Fang			4th voted out	Day 12
Danny "GC" Brown	25	Portland, Oregon	Fang	Fang			5th voted out	Day 15
Kelly Czarnecki	22	Buffalo Grove, Illinois	Kota	Fang			6th voted out	Day 18
Ace Gordon	27	Naples, Florida	Kota	Fang			7th voted out	Day 21
Dan Kay	32	Boston, Massachusetts	Fang	Kota			8th voted out	Day 21
Marcus Lehman	28	Atlanta, Georgia	Kota	Kota	Kota		9th voted out 1st jury member	Day 24
Charlie Herschel	29	New York City, New York	Kota	Kota	Fang	Nobag	10th voted out 2nd jury member	Day 27
Randy Bailey	49	Eagle Rock, Missouri	Fang	Kota	Fang	Nobag	11th voted out 3rd jury member	Day 30
Corinne Kaplan	29	Los Angeles, California	Kota	Kota	Fang	Nobag	12th voted out 4th jury member	Day 33
Crystal Cox	29	Durham, North Carolina	Fang	Fang	Kota	Nobag	13th voted out 5th jury member	Day 36
Kenny Hoang	22	Westminster, California	Fang	Fang	Kota	Nobag	14th voted out 6th jury member	Day 37
Matty Whitmore	29	Pacific Palisades, California	Fang	Fang	Fang	Nobag	Eliminated; 7th jury member	Day 38
Jessica "Sugar" Kiper	29	Brooklyn, New York	Kota	Fang	Fang	Nobag	2nd runner-up	Day 39
Jesusita "Susie" Smith	47	Charles City, Iowa	Fang	Kota	Kota	Nobag	Runner-up	Day 39
Robert "Bob" Crowley	57	Portland, Maine	Kota	Kota	Kota	Nobag	Sole Survivor	Day 39

=== Future appearances ===
Jessica "Sugar" Kiper and Randy Bailey returned for Survivor: Heroes vs. Villains. Corinne Kaplan returned for Survivor: Caramoan.

Outside of Survivor, Kaplan competed on The Amazing Race 31 with two-time Survivor contestant Eliza Orlins. In 2020, Marcus Lehman competed on FOX's Labor of Love.

== Season summary ==
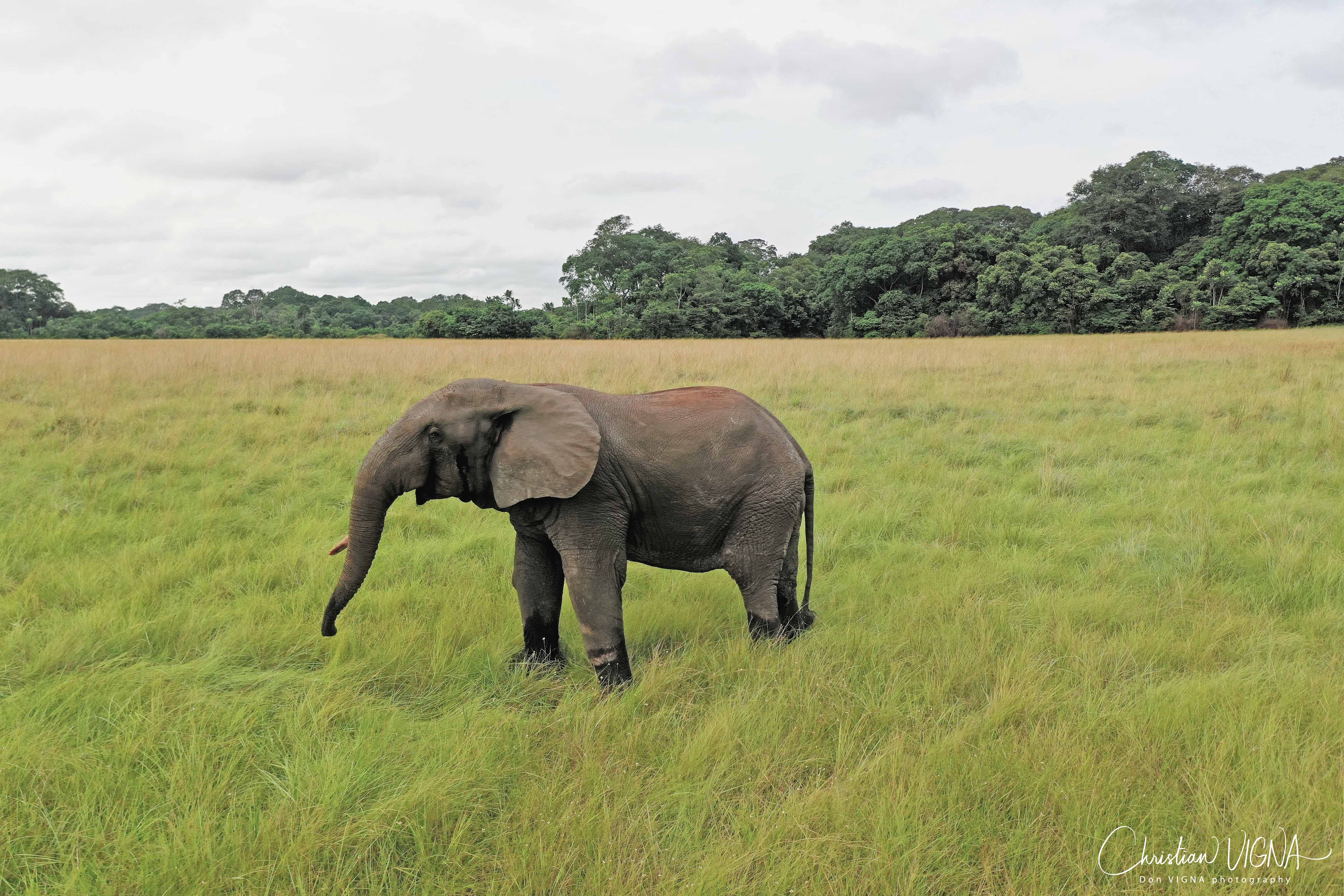
The season filmed in Estuaire Province in Gabon.

The players were divided into tribes by a schoolyard pick started by the oldest players, Bob and Gillian. It became evident that Gillian's tribe, Fang, was weaker, losing many of the reward and immunity challenges even after a tribal switch, but a core alliance between Matty, Ken, and Crystal developed. On Bob's tribe, Kota, a series of alliances were formed, strengthened after the swap with the addition of Randy. Both the hidden immunity idol and Exile Island were in play; the winning tribe on reward challenges was able to send one of the losing tribe's members to the latter. At Exile, that player had the option of a clue to the immunity idol hidden near Exile (ultimately leading to a string of hidden clues to the idol), or to relax in a small shack with a provision of fruit and a hammock. Sugar was the second player to visit Exile and found the idol on her first visit; she was repeatedly sent back to Exile, where, isolated from both tribes, she relaxed most of the time. Sugar's idol was eventually discovered by Matty, Ken, and Crystal, and they decided to bring her into their alliance, with Ken convincing her to vote off her closest ally Ace who he claimed was using her for the idol.

On Day 22, both tribes were given clues suggesting a tribal merge; they enjoyed a celebratory meal, and discovered a hidden immunity idol nearby. Unanimously, the players agreed to throw the idol away into the ocean. They then discovered they were still separate tribes, mixed by random draw, and returned to their camps. This development proved crucial for the minority Fang alliance, who successfully convinced Kota alliance member Susie that she was on the bottom of her alliance, resulting in the elimination of Kota alliance leader Marcus. The tribes were then merged with the former Kota alliance in the minority. The Fang alliance, now with Susie, dominated the game, eliminating the former Kota alliance until only Bob was left. Bob won three consecutive immunity challenges, forcing the Fang alliance to turn on themselves and resulting in the eliminations of Crystal and Ken due to their strong strategic prowess.

The final four were Matty, Sugar, Susie, and Bob. Susie won the final immunity challenge and ended Bob's immunity streak. Sugar decided to vote with Bob due to their social bond, forcing a tie between him and Matty; Bob won the fire-making tiebreaker challenge.

At the Final Tribal Council, the jury criticized Sugar for her backstabbing, not owning her game, and playing with her emotions. Susie was praised for playing under the radar strategically, while Bob was praised for his physical game, creating two fake immunity idols, and having control of his fate. The jury voted Bob the Sole Survivor in a 4-3-0 vote over Susie and Sugar, respectively.

Challenge winners and eliminations by episode
Episode			Challenge winner(s)		Exile Island	Eliminated	
No.	Title	Original air date	Reward	Immunity	Exile Island	Tribe	Player
1	"Want to See the Elephant Dung?"	September 25, 2008	Kota (Note: During the initial challenge, the first player from each tribe to complete it won individual immunity at their first Tribal Council, while the first tribe to complete the challenge won the reward.)	GC (Fang)	None	Fang	Michelle
1	"Want to See the Elephant Dung?"	September 25, 2008	Kota		None	Fang	Michelle
1	"Want to See the Elephant Dung?"	September 25, 2008	Kota		Dan (Fang)	Fang	Gillian
2	"She Obviously Is Post-Op!"	October 2, 2008	Fang	Fang	Sugar (Kota)	Kota	Paloma
2	"She Obviously Is Post-Op!"	October 2, 2008	Fang	Marcus (Kota)	Sugar (Kota)	Kota	Paloma
3	"It Was Like Christmas Morning!"	October 9, 2008	None (Note: There was no Reward Challenge due to a tribe switch.)	Kota	Sugar (Note: Sugar was exiled after not being chosen for a tribe, and joined the tribe that lost the next immunity challenge: Fang.)	Fang	Jacquie
4	"This Camp Is Cursed"	October 16, 2008	Kota	Kota	Sugar (Fang)	Fang	GC
5	"He's a Snake, But He's My Snake"	October 23, 2008	Kota	Kota	Sugar (Fang)	Fang	Kelly
6	"It All Depends on the Pin-Up Girl"	October 30, 2008	Kota	Marcus (Note: Marcus won the individual immunity challenge, and chose Sugar to receive immunity as well.) (Kota)	Sugar (Fang)	Fang	Ace
6	"It All Depends on the Pin-Up Girl"	October 30, 2008	Kota	Sugar (Fang)	Sugar (Fang)	Kota	Dan
7	"Apple in the Garden of Eden"	November 6, 2008	None	Fang	None	Kota	Marcus
8	"The Brains Behind Everything"	November 13, 2008	Fang	Susie	Bob (Kota)	Nobag	Charlie
9	""Nothing Tastes Better Than Five Hundred Dollars"	November 20, 2008	Survivor Auction	Ken	Bob	Nobag	Randy
10	"I Was Put on a Planet For This Show"	November 27, 2008	Recap Episode				
11	"The Good Things in Life Aren’t Easy"	December 4, 2008	Bob	Bob	None (Note: As part of a special event in which all players got to see their loved ones, nobody was sent to Exile Island.)	Nobag	Corinne
12	"The Good Guys Should Win in the End"	December 11, 2008	Bob [Crystal, Ken]	Bob	Susie	Nobag	Crystal
13	"Say Goodbye to Gabon"	December 14, 2008	None	Bob	None	Nobag	Ken
13	"Say Goodbye to Gabon"	December 14, 2008	None	Susie	None	Nobag	Matty
14	"Reunion"	December 14, 2008					

In the case of multiple tribes or castaways who win reward or immunity, they are listed in order of finish, or alphabetically where it was a team effort; where one castaway won and invited others, the invitees are in brackets.

== Episodes ==
No. overall	No. in season	Title	Rating/share (household)	Rating/share (18-49)	Original release date	U.S. viewers (millions)	Weekly rank
245	1	"Want to See the Elephant Dung?"	7.7/12	4.4/11	September 25, 2008	13.06	#13
The castaways were welcomed to the game by Jeff with just their street clothes. After introducing themselves, the tribes were divided by schoolyard pick. As traditional in Gabon, Jeff announced that the oldest people usually make the decisions in the tribe and therefore the oldest castaways, Bob and Gillian, started the pick. After the tribes were picked, tribe names Fang and Kota were announced, and buffs passed out, Jeff announced the first challenge for individual Immunity Idols and extra food.: Tribal Reward/Individual Immunity Challenge: The tribes would have to race across the plain and up a hill. The first castaway from each tribe to the top of the hill would win an Individual Immunity Idol that would only be good at their tribe's first Tribal Council. The first entire tribe to the top of the hill would win an extra bag of corn and beans.; Marcus and GC won individual Immunity Idols and Kota won the extra bag of food. At the Kota tribe, Bob and Ace took charge and organized the campsite. At the Fang tribe, a nighttime visit by an elephant spooked the tribe. Randy hit his head on the tribe's hut, requiring a visit by the Survivor medical team to put in several stitches.: Reward/Immunity Challenge: Six tribe members would be belted together and have to race through a swamp, over a net wall, and under and over a series of hitching posts. The six would then have to dig up three bags of puzzle pieces and deliver them to the three remaining tribe members. These three would then assemble the puzzle pieces to win flint and immunity.; At a combined Reward/Immunity Challenge, Kota pulled far ahead while digging up the puzzle bags and won by a blowout. Before Tribal Council, Michelle and Gillian were targets for votes due to their negativity and age, respectively. Michelle's negativity outweighed concerns over age and she was voted out. After the vote, Jeff announced that Fang would be taking their torches back to camp and gave them a flint. Picked as the leader of Fang at Tribal Council, GC started the tribe's first fire and organized jobs to fix up the campsite. At Kota, Charlie and Marcus formed an alliance; the two expanded their alliance to include Jacquie and Corinne. The four discussed bringing in Bob to have a majority, though Bob would be kept out of the core alliance of four. In the early morning of day 5, GC resigned his leadership of the tribe after arguing with Gillian over waking up early and making too much noise. After receiving tree mail announcing the next challenge, Dan tried to unify Fang by painting everybody with charcoal face paint.: Reward/Immunity Challenge: The tribes have to roll a large ball through a series of gates. At two points along the course, a tribe member would have to climb atop the ball to retrieve of set of keys. At the final gate, the keys would unlock three chains that blocked the gate. The first tribe to go through all the gates and roll their boulder atop a short pedestal wins fishing gear and immunity.; Despite Fang's attempts to boost morale, Kota won their third challenge in a row. Kota selected Dan to go to Exile Island, where he chose to get a clue to the Hidden Immunity Idol, but he was not able to decode the clue to find it. At Fang, Randy fashioned a fishing hook out of parts from his glasses and the tribe was finally able to get some meat. Gillian suggested to Susie that the two of them form an alliance, fearing they might have been next in line to be voted out since they were the oldest women in the game; she suggested the two vote off Ken because Gillian thought he was useless. Dan's behavior after he returned from Exile Island made the others suspicious that he had found the Hidden Immunity Idol. This caused some of the Fang tribe to reconsider voting out Gillian, and instead vote for Dan. At Tribal Council, before the vote, Dan emptied his bag to show the tribe that he did not have the Hidden Immunity Idol. Gillian's weakness at physical challenges was seen as a greater concern than Dan's potential of having the Hidden Immunity Idol and she was voted out.
246	2	"She Obviously Is Post-Op!"	7.7/12	4.3/12	October 2, 2008	13.08	#12
At Fang, the argument over who was or was not the tribe leader continued. At Kota, the rest of the tribe was annoyed at Ace's attitude of being king of the tribe.: Reward Challenge: One member of each tribe would hang on to a post. Two members of the opposing tribe would attempt to remove the tribe member from the post and drag them across the sand to the finish line. The first tribe to get the member of the other tribe across the finish line would receive one point. The first tribe to score two points wins blankets, a hammock, pillows, and a mat.; At the Reward Challenge, Ace chose Paloma to hang onto the post. However, the Fang members easily overpowered her, leading to their first victory. They also elected to send Sugar to Exile Island. The win re-energized the Fang tribe and they finally felt like a team. Meanwhile, at Kota, Paloma's poor effort at the challenge caused her to be seen as the weakest link in the tribe. Corinne talked to Bob about joining her alliance of four, though she kept him in the dark about his status in the endgame. On Exile Island, Sugar elected to receive a clue to the Hidden Immunity Idol over comfort and followed the clues to find the Hidden Immunity Idol. Sugar then revealed that her father's recent death was the motivation for her playing the game.: Immunity Challenge: One at a time, six tribe members would slide down a water slide. They would then swim out to retrieve a numbered tile, then run up the hill they slid down to drop their number off. Once all six tiles were retrieved, the remaining castaway would use the tiles to solve a numeric puzzle. The answer to the puzzle is a combination to open a locked chest which holds an ax. The first tribe to open their chest and use the ax to cut a rope that would raise their tribe's flag would win.; During the Immunity Challenge, Ken secured Fang's victory by overcoming Kota's lead at the tile retrieval stage and solving the numeric puzzle before Bob. After the Immunity Challenge and back at their camp, Sugar told Ace that she found the Hidden Immunity Idol while leading the others to believe she didn't have it. Paloma approached Corinne about forming an alliance and targeting Ace for elimination, due to Ace being manipulative and trying to set her up for failure at the Reward Challenge. At Tribal Council, Ace's attitude at camp was discussed, but the tribe chose to remove their weakest physical link and voted out Paloma.
247	3	"It Was Like Christmas Morning!"	7.7/12	4.3/12	October 9, 2008	13.28	#12
After Tribal Council, Ace was upset at Kelly's animosity towards him and her vote against him. In retaliation, he targeted her for the next elimination. Over at Fang, an alliance of Dan, Matty, Randy, and Susie formed and targeted GC for elimination. The remaining members of Fang, Crystal, GC, and Ken formed their own alliance. When the tribes next gathered, Jeff announced that the castaways would rank their tribemates by secret survey according to their importance within the tribe. Kota ranked Marcus as most important in their tribe followed by Ace, Bob, Charlie, Jacquie, Corinne, Sugar, and Kelly. Fang ranked Matty as most important in their tribe followed by Dan, Randy, Crystal, Ken, GC, and Susie. After announcing the rankings, Jeff told the castaways to drop their buffs as they would be picking new tribes by schoolyard pick once again. Voted as most important within their tribes, Marcus and Matty stayed with their original tribes and started the draft. The new Kota was Marcus, Dan, Charlie, Randy, Corinne, Susie, and Bob, while the new Fang tribe consisted of Matty, Ace, Crystal, Jacquie, Ken, Kelly, and GC. As Sugar was not selected during the process, she was sent to Exile Island. She would stay there until after the next Tribal Council and then join the tribe that lost the next Immunity Challenge. Since she had already found the Hidden Immunity Idol, Sugar chose the comfort option at Exile Island. At the newly formed Fang campsite, Crystal noticed that Kelly felt like an outcast at the old Kota and invited her to join her alliance with GC and Ken.: Immunity Challenge: The tribes would play a lacrosse-like game on the water. Each tribe member would be on a raft and have a paddle. Each round, Probst would toss a ball into the water. The castaways would paddle around the playing field, using the paddle to pass the ball from one tribemate to another. The first tribe to throw the ball three times into their opponents goal would win.; At the Immunity Challenge, Randy scored all three goals for Kota in their shutout victory over Fang. Kelly's poor performance at the challenge made Crystal, GC, and Ken reconsider their alliance with her, as they now perceived her as the weakest member of the tribe. However, they decided to target Jacquie instead, realizing that Sugar might have the Hidden Immunity Idol and with it, the trio of Ace, Sugar, and Jacquie would hold power within the tribe. They wanted to ensure that Ace in particular had as little power as possible, as he was also a physical threat. The three shared their plan with Matty to persuade him to vote their way, but he immediately informed Jacquie of the development. Jacquie tried to plead her case to Ken and Crystal, casting herself as an outsider who was not allied with Ace and really wanted to remain in the game. However, her effort was in vain, as the original Fang stuck to their plan at Tribal Council, voting Jacquie out.
248	4	"This Camp Is Cursed"	7.8/13	4.2/12	October 16, 2008	12.81	#12
Sugar arrived at Fang to join her new tribe and was surprised to see that Jacquie was voted out at the last Tribal Council. She continued to feign that she had not found the Hidden Immunity Idol, but Crystal did not believe her and targeted her next for elimination. On day 13, the Fang tribe were visited by an elephant just across the river from their camp.: Reward Challenge: A tribe member would toss fruit through a hole in a wall to two members of their own tribe. An opposing tribe member would stand in front of the wall and use a club to try to knock away the fruit as it was thrown through the air. Once a piece of fruit is caught by a tribe member, it would have to be thrown through a hole in a second wall defended by a second opposing tribe member. The tribe that catches the most fruit by weight after five minutes would win an herb garden, salt, oil, chili sauce, and all fruit collected from the challenge.; At the Reward Challenge, a strategy change of tossing two fruit at a time over Ace defending the second wall helped Kota win the challenge by 2 pounds (0.91 kg). Kota chose to send Sugar to Exile Island for the third time in a row, with Dan stating that it was a strategy move to force her to play the Hidden Immunity Idol before the tribal merge as they wanted it back into circulation. At Exile Island, Sugar once again opted for the comfort. At the Fang camp, the pressure of the game started to get to GC and he argued with Crystal. Immediately before they were to leave for the Immunity Challenge, he went off alone in the tribe's kayak, causing his tribemates to call out for him. He returned just before they left for the challenge.: Immunity Challenge: One member from each tribe would roll a large ball made of interwoven sticks down a hill. A blindfolded tribe member at the bottom of the hill would attempt to block the opposing tribe's ball with a shield and the aid of a caller. Behind the blocker would be a row of seven goals of varying point values. If a tribe's ball made it past the blocker and into a goal, they would be awarded the specified number of points. The tribe with the most points after five rounds would win.; At the Immunity Challenge, Fang was in the lead until the last round of the challenge when Randy, the caller for Kota, tricked Ace, the blocker for Fang, into stopping and allowing the last Kota ball to reach the goal. The final points were enough for Kota to win the challenge, continuing their winning streak. Before Tribal Council, GC told Matty that he was ready to leave the game. Crystal searched Sugar’s bag and found that Sugar had the Hidden Immunity Idol. Although Crystal, Kelly, Ken, and Matty believed that the upcoming Tribal Council was the ideal time to blindside Sugar, they decided instead to grant GC’s wish to leave and he was voted out.
249	5	"He's a Snake, But He's My Snake"	7.8/12	4.4/12	October 23, 2008	13.31	#14
The day after Tribal Council, Matty and Ace made a pact to take each other to the tribal merger as long as Ace could keep Sugar in the game and Matty could keep Ken in the game. Matty swore on his girlfriend and Ace swore on his mother's life. Over at Kota, Dan's extra helpings of food caused conflict among the tribe while the dwindling food supplies at Fang made them rethink their rationing of food. After Ace told Sugar that he thought the rest of Fang went through her bag and discovered the Hidden Immunity Idol, she gave him the idol for safekeeping.: Reward Challenge: The tribes would be tethered to a 20-foot (6.1 m) long, 200-pound (91 kg) cloth snake. The tribes would start at opposite ends of an oval course. Both tribes would run counter-clockwise around the course and try to catch up to the other tribe. If a tribe member could not continue, they may unhook themselves from the snake and the remaining tribe members would continue the challenge. The first tribe to catch the other tribe and touch one of the opposing tribe members would win croissants, fruit tarts, chocolate éclairs, coffee, and tea.; At the Reward Challenge, Kota won their fourth consecutive challenge when Ken, Sugar, Kelly, and Crystal were unable to keep up and dropped out of the challenge, leaving an exhausted Ace and Matty to be chased down by the five men of Kota. Randy's taunting of an emotional Crystal did not sit well with her and she predicted that the old Fang and new Fang members would not get along. Kota chose to send Sugar back to Exile Island for the fourth time. Unlike her last visit where she enjoyed the food with the comfort, Sugar felt guilty about eating while her fellow tribe members subsisted on three scoops of rice. Kelly thought that Crystal crying after the Reward Challenge was a sign of weakness, but Crystal said that it was not.: Immunity Challenge: The tribes would divide into three pairs. Each pair would be tethered together by a rope. The first pair would crawl under a cargo net, race through the jungle, go through an obstacle, retrieve two sections of a flag pole, and return to the starting line. The next pair would run the same course with an additional obstacle to retrieve the next two pieces of the flag pole. The final pair would run the course with two additional obstacles and retrieve the final two pieces of the flag pole. The first tribe to collect all of the flag pole pieces and assemble their flag would win.; At the Immunity Challenge, good teamwork by Kota during the flag pole assembly versus Ace trying to assemble Fang's flag alone allowed Kota to extend their winning streak to five challenges in a row. After the challenge, Matty approached Ace about blindsiding Sugar to flush the Hidden Immunity Idol, but Ace convinced Matty not to worry about the Hidden Immunity Idol being played and to vote for Kelly, though Ace did not tell Matty that he had the idol. Crystal also wanted to blindside Sugar or vote out Ace, but Matty told her of Ace's plans. Ken talked to Matty about blindsiding Ace, but Matty told Ken that he made a promise that he could not break. Lastly, Ken talked to Sugar about Ace and she told Ken that she had given the idol to Ace. Ken was unable to convince Sugar to change her alliances, but Ken did make sure that Sugar took the idol back from Ace. At Tribal Council, none of the blindside plans came to fruition and Kelly was voted out.
250	6	"It All Depends on the Pin-Up Girl"	7.7/13	4.1/12	October 30, 2008	13.02	#15
The day after Tribal Council, Crystal accidentally kicked over Fang's rice supply, which upset Ace and Matty. At the Kota camp, the alliance of Charlie, Corinne, and Marcus made Dan uncomfortable and he approached them feeling left out.: Reward Challenge: In two roped off squares, three members of a tribe would toss a breakable ball back and forth. An opposing tribe member would attempt to smash or knock the ball to the ground. The first tribe to break the opposing tribe's ball would score a point for the round. The first tribe to score three points would win a helicopter ride to a picnic. Not announced at the challenge was an additional reward of letters from home.; At the Reward Challenge, Kota continued their winning streak by shutting out Fang 3-0; Sugar was chosen to go to Exile Island for the fifth consecutive time. Back at camp, Matty voiced his frustration at Sugar’s lack of effort at the challenge. Matty offered Ace a plan to vote out Sugar without Ace having to stab her in the back, but Ace wanted to vote out Crystal instead. Meanwhile, Ken talked to Crystal about blindsiding Ace. During Kota's reward picnic, a crew member of the helicopter surprised them with letters from home. At the Immunity Challenge, Jeff announced that both tribes would be going to Tribal Council, that they would be playing for Individual Immunity, and there would be a twist announced after the Challenge was done.: Immunity Challenge: The castaways would compete in a head-to-head logrolling contest in a single-elimination tournament. Each castaway is matched up against another castaway. The first person to fall off from the log is eliminated from the challenge. The final round would have three castaways rolling the log at the same time. The last person remaining would win immunity.; Marcus won the Individual Immunity by defeating Sugar and Ace. The twist was that Marcus had to assign Individual Immunity to one member of the other tribe and he selected Sugar. After the Immunity Challenge, Ken, in an effort to blindside Ace, told Sugar about Ace and Matty plotting to vote her out. Later, Ace asked Sugar to give him the Hidden Immunity Idol, which made her think Ken's story was true. At Fang's Tribal Council, Ken's plan to blindside Ace came to fruition as Sugar cast the deciding vote against Ace and he was voted out. The afternoon before Kota's Tribal Council, Dan scrambled to keep himself in the game. Charlie, Corinne, and Marcus replaced Bob in their alliance with Randy, though they did not tell Bob. Susie upset Corinne by telling her she had planned to vote for her. Corinne immediately went to her alliance and told them that she wanted to vote out Susie. Corinne, Charlie, Marcus, Randy, and Bob split their votes between Dan and Susie, convincing each to vote for the other and hoping that the immunity idol would be flushed out if Dan had it in his possession. Ultimately, Dan was voted out.
251	7	"Apple in the Garden of Eden"	7.2/11	3.8/10	November 6, 2008	12.01	#15
Back at camp after Tribal Council, Marcus and Corinne addressed Susie over her opinion that she was a stronger player than Corinne. Over at Fang's camp site, the tribe tried to start over and looked ahead to an expected tribal merger. After tree mail hinted at a tribal merge, the castaways packed up their personal items and went to a beach for a feast. At the feast, a clue for a second Hidden Immunity Idol was tucked under a locked box that the castaways would open after the feast was over. Ken noticed the note first, but when he tried to get the note for himself, Charlie saw the note and forced Ken to share the note with everybody. When nobody showed much interest in going to find the idol for fear of looking greedy, Marcus proposed to dig up the Hidden Immunity Idol, but to throw it in the ocean so that nobody could use it. Although many were tempted to take the Idol, the castaways finally agreed to throw it into the ocean. When the castaways opened the locked box, they were instructed to each draw a numbered stone from a bag. A second note was then read, stating that they had just selected new tribes. Castaways with odd numbers would be the new Fang and the even numbers the new Kota. At the new Kota, Marcus identified Crystal as the cousin of one of his friends, forming a connection with her. The two agreed not to write each other's names down at Tribal Council, but Crystal later stated in a confessional she had no intention to be loyal to him. Marcus tried to convince Susie to join his alliance with himself and Bob. At the new Fang, Corinne felt that the greatest threat to her alliance with Marcus was Matty and she wanted to vote him out next. Matty told Sugar that Ace never targeted her contrary to what Ken told her and she felt bad about blindsiding Ace at the last Tribal Council. The two formed a new alliance. Concerned over how Susie would vote at a Kota Tribal Council, Randy talked to Charlie and Corinne about throwing the next Immunity Challenge to force Fang to go to Tribal Council where the three would vote out Matty.: Immunity Challenge: The castaways would hold two poles on the tops of their hands up against a board over their heads. Any movement in their hands would cause the poles to drop to the ground. If the castaway dropped his or her poles, he would be eliminated from the challenge. The last person who does not drop their poles would win immunity for their tribe and keep all of its members safe. In other words, the first tribe to have all its members drop their poles would lose immunity.; At the Immunity Challenge, Matty outlasted Bob and he won the challenge for Fang, spoiling Charlie, Corinne, and Randy's plans. Marcus tried to keep the Kota six alliance going by approaching Crystal about replacing Susie in the Kota six and voting out Ken followed by Susie, but she did not want to vote out her ally, Ken. Marcus told a different story to Susie, telling her the plan would be to vote out Ken followed by Crystal. He also promised to take Susie to the final three. Not wanting to betray her long term alliance with Ken, Crystal told Ken what Marcus told her. Crystal tried to convince Susie that Marcus's promise of a final three was not possible because Corinne and Randy disliked Susie too much to allow that to happen. At Tribal Council, Susie decided to join Crystal and Ken, and they made Marcus the first member of the jury.
252	8	"The Brains Behind Everything"	7.6/12	4.1/11	November 13, 2008	12.89	#15
Several castaways expected a merge notice via tree mail, but instead the tribes received a Reward Challenge note. Upon seeing the Marcus-less Kota tribe, Charlie and Corinne were visibly shocked at their ally's ouster.: Reward Challenge: The tribes would use a three man slingshot to shoot an oversized golf ball along three golf holes. The tribe that put their ball in the hole using fewer shots would receive one point. The first tribe to score two points would win an overnight trip to a Gabonese village.; Fang came from behind to win the Reward Challenge. Corinne announced that Fang was going to send Bob to Exile Island, hoping that he would find the Hidden Immunity Idol, but not knowing that Sugar had already found it. At Exile Island, Bob followed the clues to the Hidden Immunity Idol and found the location where the idol would have been. Unable to find the idol and thinking that Sugar may have found it, Bob fabricated a fake Hidden Immunity Idol that he hoped to use as a bluff. On day 27, before the start of the Immunity Challenge, Jeff announced that the tribes had merged.: Immunity Challenge: The castaways would make a fire large enough to burn through a rope using flint, steel, and a box of fire making supplies. The first castaway to completely burn through their rope would win immunity.; Susie and Sugar were the only two castaways to get a fire started during the Immunity Challenge, with Susie being the first to burn through her rope to win individual immunity. The castaways returned to the old Fang campsite, found that they had received new food supplies, and named themselves Nobag ("Gabon" backwards). The alliance of Charlie, Corinne, and Randy saw Sugar as a swing vote at Tribal Council to vote for Crystal, whom Randy wanted voted out. Sugar told Charlie and Corinne that she could not live with Randy any more and Corinne tried to convince Sugar that if she voted with their alliance that they would vote Randy out next. To get revenge for forcing him to share the note about the second Hidden Immunity Idol at the feast, Ken decided to blindside Charlie by fabricating a story that Charlie was the brains behind the Kota alliance. Ken told the story to his alliance of Crystal, Matty, and Susie who believed his story and agreed to vote for Charlie. Ken told the same story to Sugar in an effort to get her vote for Charlie. At Tribal Council, Crystal confronted Randy over why he disliked her so much. Sugar joined the alliance of Crystal, Ken, Matty, and Susie, because she did not want to align with Randy and Corinne, and Charlie was sent to the jury.
253	9	"Nothing Tastes Better Than Five Hundred Dollars"	7.5/12	4.0/11	November 20, 2008	12.50	#14
Not knowing that Sugar had the Hidden Immunity Idol, Bob told her that he did not have it and showed her the fake idol that he made.: Survivor Auction: Instead of a Reward Challenge, a Survivor Auction was held. Each castaway was given $500. Items won included food and drinks, a secret item for the next Immunity Challenge, the power to send someone to Exile Island and take their remaining money, and a hot bath with fresh clothes.; The second item up for bid was unknown as it was covered. After making the winning bid, Ken discovered he had won the right to send somebody to Exile Island and take their money. He chose Bob who immediately departed for Exile Island. For the second to last item at the auction, Corinne won a sealed bottle with a note that would give her an advantage at the next Immunity Challenge. Randy won the last item of the auction, chocolate chip cookies to share with the tribe. Sugar declined the first cookie offered to her which Randy then split between Matty and Corinne. Without taking one for himself, Randy offered Sugar the last cookie. She took it and gave it to Matty which upset Randy. At Exile Island, after getting no additional help from the Hidden Immunity Idol clue, Bob decided to go on a personal safari instead of looking for the idol. After the auction, Corinne and Randy talked to Matty about joining their alliance with Bob. Instead of joining with Corinne and Randy, Matty lobbied his alliance to vote out Bob next instead of Randy. Randy decided that the only option available to his alliance was to annoy the Fang alliance, get them to all vote for him, pull out the Hidden Immunity Idol that he assumed Bob had found, and blindside Susie at Tribal Council in revenge for her flipping to the Fang alliance. Randy told Matty that Matty had "whored [himself] out" to the original Kota alliance, at which point Matty rescinded his voting off order and gave into his alliance's want of voting Randy off.: Immunity Challenge: In the first round, the castaways would race across a series of balance beams carrying a bag of puzzle blocks. The first two castaways to bring all three of their bags would go to the final round in which each player must stack all of their pieces like a line of domino tiles while avoiding ropes that would topple the tiles that were already stacked. Once all of the blocks were properly stacked, the castaway would start a chain reaction which would release a flag. The first castaway to raise their flag would win.; At the Immunity Challenge, Corinne's sealed note that she bought at the Survivor Auction stated that she would skip the first round and go directly to the final round. Despite her advantage, Ken defeated her and Matty in the final round. After the Immunity Challenge, Bob told Sugar that he still did not have the Hidden Immunity Idol and she told him that he should give his fake idol to Randy. Figuring that he had nothing to lose and it would keep him in the game, Bob agreed to Sugar’s plan and gave Randy the fake idol. At Tribal Council, Randy pulled out the idol before the votes were read. Jeff announced that it was not a hidden immunity idol and tossed the idol into the fire pit. The votes against Randy were counted and he was sent to the jury.
254	10	"I Was Put on the Planet For This Show"	4.9/10	2.3/7	November 27, 2008	8.31	TBA
A recap of the first 30 days including previously un-aired bonus footage.
255	11	"The Good Things in Life Aren’t Easy"	7.5/12	4.0/11	December 4, 2008	12.73	#11
Back at camp after Tribal Council, Bob was upset at all of the laughing when Randy was voted out. Corinne and Sugar argued over how to play the game. At the Reward Challenge, the castaways got to view a short video clip from their loved ones before the schoolyard pick. Jeff said that the castaways' loved ones were not around the corner and he only had the videos of them. Because "today is all about love" according to Jeff, nobody was sent to Exile Island.: Reward Challenge: The castaways would be split into two teams of three by schoolyard pick. The unpicked castaway would be ineligible to win the reward. The teams would be roped together and have to race through a swamp to collect seven sprocket pieces at two different stations. After collecting all the sprockets, the team would have to assemble them on a board in order to turn another sprocket which in turn would raise a flag. The members of the winning team would move on to the final round to individually solve a sliding puzzle. The first castaway to solve the puzzle would win a video from their loved one, pizza, beer, and brownies. Not announced at the challenge was an in-person visit from their loved one.; The schoolyard pick resulted in one team of Susie, Matty, and Ken and another team of Crystal, Sugar, and Bob; Corinne was not picked, so she could not win. The team of Bob, Crystal, and Sugar came from behind to win the first round of the challenge and moved on to the final round. Bob won the Reward Challenge by quickly solving his sliding puzzle first. Jeff then told the rest of the tribe that he had nothing for them and told them to head back to camp. While Bob was watching the video clip from his wife, she paused and said that there was "something I wanted to show you" and moved off-camera. Contrary to what Jeff said at the start of the Reward Challenge, Peggy, Bob's wife, was in Gabon and she stepped around the corner to surprise Bob. Bob and Peggy then walked hand in hand to the Nobag campsite to meet the rest of the castaways. After introducing his wife to the tribe, Bob turned and whistled to signal the other castaways' loved ones to make an appearance. Matty proposed to his girlfriend, Jamie. The loved ones departed camp before sundown. Bob shared with Corinne a plan to blindside Matty where Bob would make up a second fake Immunity Idol and tell the Fang alliance that it was the idol that Marcus threw into the ocean. Bob's story was that Marcus only threw the bottle into the ocean, had hidden the idol around the camp, and told Bob where it was.: Immunity Challenge: The castaways would be asked trivia questions about Gabon. For each question answered correctly, the castaway would earn one ball. After four questions are asked, the castaways would throw the balls that they won down a hill at a target divided into zones. The castaway who throws their ball into the zone closest to the center of the target would win.; At the Immunity Challenge, Bob won by throwing his second ball one zone from the center. With Bob's win, Corinne expanded upon her blindsiding plan with Bob by concocting the story that Bob would have played the idol tossed into the ocean at the next Tribal Council, but since he won Individual Immunity, he would give Corinne the lost idol. Bob and Corinne hoped that the threat of Corinne having an idol would deter the Fang alliance from voting for her and would instead vote for Matty. Corinne told the story to Ken, which he believed and he suggested that Bob and Corinne approach Crystal with their plan. Bob told the story to Crystal and showed her the second fake idol. Crystal and Ken talked about their voting strategy under this plan where Ken would vote for Matty, Crystal would vote for Corinne, resulting in a 4-3 vote split between Corinne and Matty, respectively, Corinne would play the lost idol negating votes against her, the lost idol would be flushed, and Matty would be going home. At Tribal Council, the vote went as Crystal and Ken planned, Corinne's bluff was called and she was sent to the jury.
256	12	"The Good Guys Should Win in the End"	7.7/12	4.1/11	December 11, 2008	13.05	#14
After the castaways returned from Tribal Council, Matty was upset because Ken voted for him. Ken told Matty about Bob and Corinne's fake Hidden Immunity Idol, but Matty did not believe him. Ken confronted Bob about the fake Hidden Immunity Idol. Bob promised Ken that if he won the next Immunity Challenge that he would give the immunity necklace to Ken.: Reward Challenge: The castaways would race through a swamp and over several obstacles to retrieve one of three balls. They would then return to the start and toss the ball into a net. The first castaway to retrieve all three balls and get them into the net would win an overnight helicopter trip to a gorilla sanctuary in Loango National Park, a meal, a shower, and a bed to sleep in.; Bob won the Reward Challenge and chose to take Crystal and Ken along on the trip and to send Susie to Exile Island. While on the trip, Bob reiterated his promise to give the immunity necklace to Ken. Ken decided that he would only take it if he felt he was in danger of being voted out. On Exile Island, Susie selected the comfort choice because she knew that Sugar already had the Hidden Immunity Idol. Back at camp, Matty tried to get Sugar to give him the Hidden Immunity Idol. After returning from the reward trip, Crystal yelled at Matty for him questioning Crystal and Ken's loyalty to him. The yelling made Sugar change her opinion about Crystal and Ken. She told Matty that he would not be going home after the next Tribal Council and hatched a plan to take out Crystal and Ken.: Immunity Challenge: The castaways would be blindfolded during the challenge. At the starting line would be a Gabonese mask. At the other end of a net obstacle would be a duplicate mask with some pieces removed. Three bags of puzzle pieces would need to be carried across the net obstacle one at a time. The puzzle pieces would then need to be assembled to replicate the mask at the start line. The first castaway to correctly replicate the mask would win.; At the Immunity Challenge, Bob won immunity for the second time in a row, marking his fourth consecutive challenge win. Ken told Crystal, Matty, and Sugar that Bob would give him the immunity necklace if they all told Bob that they would be voting for Ken, so they should tell Bob that and then vote for Bob instead to blindside him. Sugar told Bob of Ken's plan, that she would not vote for him, and to vote for Crystal. At Tribal Council, Bob and Ken said that their agreement over the immunity necklace would be that Bob would give it to Ken if Bob felt that Ken was in danger of being voted out. Jeff stated that this Tribal Council would be the last Tribal Council where the Hidden Immunity Idol could be played. Sugar was openly wearing the Hidden Immunity Idol. Before the voting started, Jeff asked Bob if he was going to give up the Immunity necklace. Bob stated that he was not going to give up the necklace as he thought Ken was not going to go home. Before the votes were tallied, Sugar gave the Hidden Immunity Idol to Matty who then presented it to Jeff. Ken and Crystal's votes against Matty were voided and Crystal, upon receiving the four remaining votes, was sent to the jury.
257	13	"Say Goodbye to Gabon"	7.8/12	TBA	December 14, 2008	13.77	#9
Ken felt that Bob reneged on his deal to hand over the immunity necklace at the last Tribal Council. Sugar worked on re-establishing Ken's trust in her even as she plotted with Bob to vote out Susie and Ken next.: Immunity Challenge: The castaways would have to dig a hole under a wall, cross a maze made out of planks, and untie a series of knots that would open a gate that led to a maze with 25 Gabonese huts. In three of the huts would be a bag of puzzle pieces. One puzzle bag at a time would need to be retrieved from the maze and dropped off at the finish platform. Once all three bags were retrieved, the first castaway to correctly assemble the puzzle (a replica of a Gabonese hut) would win.; At the Immunity Challenge, Bob narrowly beat Sugar, winning immunity for the third straight time and the fifth consecutive challenge. At Tribal Council, Ken felt confident going into Tribal Council that he would not be voted out, but that confidence was misplaced as he was unanimously sent to the jury. Before the start of the final Immunity Challenge, the Final Four took the traditional journey honoring the castaways voted out before them.: Immunity Challenge: The castaways would be given 200 wooden tiles. The first castaway to use the tiles to build a house of cards 10 feet (3.0 m) tall would win. There is a time limit of 30 minutes for the challenge. If after 30 minutes, no castaway has built the house of cards to over 10 feet (3.0 m) tall, the castaway who builds the tallest house of cards at the end of the time limit would win.; Susie broke Bob's challenge winning streak by having built the tallest house of cards after 30 minutes. Sugar thought about forcing a tie at the next Tribal Council due to her loyalty towards Bob for being a father figure. Bob went off into the trees to practice starting a fire, anticipating a fire making tiebreaker challenge. At Tribal Council, Sugar did force a 2–2 tie between Bob and Matty. The tiebreaker challenge was to create a fire large enough to burn through a rope, which Bob won after resuscitating his initial fire to burn through his rope before Matty managed to even get one started. As a result, Matty became the final member of the jury. The final three spent their last day at camp eating the traditional feast and burning down one of the huts at the campsite. At the final Tribal Council, Charlie asked Sugar and Susie why they felt they should be voted at the "top of the totem pole" even though they were ranked the second lowest and lowest, respectively, among their tribes before the first tribal switch. He asked Bob if the "intimate cuddling and spooning all night long" was more enjoyable than he would liked to admit. Crystal asked no question of Susie, asked Bob to tell her something that Sugar didn't tell him to do, and asked Sugar why she voted her out. Ken asked Susie why she thought she deserved the million dollars and his vote, asked Sugar why she back stabbed him, and Bob about their deal over the immunity necklace. Corinne asked Susie if she would be willing to have her vocal cords removed if she were to win the million dollars. She asked Bob to show the nasty side of Bob and make her believe that he did not like Sugar. She took the opportunity to make a callous comment about Sugar’s deceased father, to which Sugar gave an obscene gesture. Marcus asked no questions of Susie, what Sugar would do to honor her deceased father if she were to win, and for Bob to give one example of a situation in which he was responsible for his decisions. Randy asked Susie to elaborate on the time that Susie said she felt sorry for him and Sugar and Bob if they considered the consequences of putting him on the jury when they gave him the fake Hidden Immunity Idol. Matty asked Susie to tell him why Bob and Sugar were less deserving that she was of the million dollars, Sugar to reveal something that she felt that she did was evil, and Bob why Sugar and Susie were more deserving of the million dollar prize than he was.
258	14	"Reunion"	7.0/12	TBA	December 14, 2008	11.74	#15
Months later, the votes were cast and the jury revealed Bob the Sole Survivor receiving four jury votes while Susie received the remaining three and Sugar received nothing. The castaways return to discuss the season with host, Jeff Probst.

== Voting history ==
	Original tribes			First switch					Second switch	Merged tribe						
Episode	1		2	3	4	5	6		7	8	9	11	12	13		
Day	3	6	9	12	15	18	21		24	27	30	33	36	37	38	
Tribe	Fang	Fang	Kota	Fang	Fang	Fang	Fang	Kota	Kota	Nobag	Nobag	Nobag	Nobag	Nobag	Nobag	
Eliminated	Michelle	Gillian	Paloma	Jacquie	GC	Kelly	Ace	Dan	Marcus	Charlie	Randy	Corinne	Crystal	Ken	Tie (Note: The first Tribal Council vote resulted in a tie. As there were only four castaways remaining, the two tied castaways would compete in a fire making challenge to resolve the tie.)	Matty
Votes	8–1	7–1	7–2	5–2	6–1	5–1	3–2	4–3	3–2	5–4	5–3	4–3	4–0 (Note: Sugar played a hidden immunity idol on Matty; therefore, two votes against him were not counted.)	4–1	2–2	Challenge (Note: Matty lost to Bob in the fire-making tiebreaker challenge.)
Voter	Vote															
Bob			Paloma					Dan	Ken	Crystal	Susie	Matty	Crystal	Ken	Matty	Won
Susie	Michelle	Gillian						Dan	Marcus	Charlie	Randy	Corinne	Crystal	Ken	Bob	
Sugar			Paloma	Exiled (Note: Sugar was sent to Exile Island after not being chosen in the first tribal switch. She joined the tribe that lost the subsequent Immunity Challenge: Fang.)	GC	Kelly	Ace			Charlie	Randy	Corinne	Crystal	Ken	Matty	
Matty	Michelle	Gillian		Jacquie	GC	Kelly	Crystal			Charlie	Randy	Corinne	Crystal	Ken	Bob	Lost
Ken	Michelle	Gillian		Jacquie	GC	Kelly	Ace		Marcus	Charlie	Randy	Matty	~~Matty~~	Susie		
Crystal	Michelle	Gillian		Jacquie	GC	Kelly	Ace		Marcus	Charlie	Randy	Corinne	~~Matty~~			
Corinne			Paloma					Dan		Crystal	Susie	Matty				
Randy	Michelle	Gillian						Susie		Crystal	Susie					
Charlie			Paloma					Dan		Crystal						
Marcus			Paloma					Susie	Ken							
Dan	Michelle	Gillian						Susie								
Ace			Paloma	Kelly	GC	Kelly	Crystal									
Kelly			Ace	Jacquie	GC	Crystal										
GC	Michelle	Gillian		Jacquie	Kelly											
Jacquie			Paloma	Kelly												
Paloma			Ace													
Gillian	Michelle	Ken														
Michelle	Gillian															

Jury vote
Episode	14		
Day	39		
Finalist	Bob	Susie	Sugar
Votes	4–3–0		
Juror	Vote		
Matty		Yes	
Ken		Yes	
Crystal		Yes	
Corinne	Yes		
Randy	Yes		
Charlie	Yes		
Marcus	Yes		

== Production notes ==
Probst recalled that the live finale of Gabon was almost ruined as the production assistant normally in charge of bringing the Final Tribal Council votes from the production offices to the live venue had forgotten to bring them, a fact discovered just as the live show started. Probst explained that another staff member raced back to the offices, breaking into the room where the votes were secured due to having no key, and faxed the votes over to the live venue, where another production staff member retraced the votes by hand with only about 15 minutes left before the live show vote reading. In the end, the original votes arrived at the studio in time and were read.

== Production ==
=== Filming ===
This season marked the second of the series that was filmed in Africa (Survivor: Africa had been filmed seven years earlier in Kenya). Reports from Gabon indicate the show was filmed around the coastal towns of Nyonie and Ekwata in the Wonga-Wongue Presidential Reserve. This season, players sent to Exile Island had a choice of receiving a clue to the location of a Hidden Immunity Idol or a comfort item. On April 13, 2008, at the National Association of Broadcasters's annual show, Sony announced that the 17th season of Survivor would be the first to be shot in high definition, using Sony's XDCAMs. The show ranked number ten in DVR playback (2.33 million viewers), according to Nielsen prime DVR lift data from September 22, 2008 – November 23, 2008.

== Reception ==
Survivor: Gabon was initially met with generally negative reception. Host Jeff Probst originally ranked Gabon 14th out of 19 seasons in 2010, thus ranking it as the sixth-worst season of the series. He later went on to say that the show was drifting during Gabon and that he nearly quit the show as a consequence. Dalton Ross of Entertainment Weekly ranked Gabon 28th out of 40, summarizing: "It got better near the end, but it was still a case of too little, too late. The fact that so many unworthy players went so far is simply too damning." Gabon is ranked as the second-worst season of the series by Examiner.com (only ahead of Survivor: Fiji), and The Wire (only ahead of Survivor: Redemption Island). "The Purple Rock Podcast" also ranked Gabon 41st out of 48, describing the cast as one of the most "inept Survivor casts ever from a gameplay perspective." In 2012 and 2013, Survivor fan site "Survivor Oz" consistently ranked Gabon as the eighth-worst season of the series in its annual polls ranking all seasons.

However, reception for Gabon has improved significantly in recent years. In 2014, it was voted the tenth-best season by "Survivor Oz". Its ranking improved substantially again in 2015, when it was ranked the seventh-best season. In 2015, a poll by Rob Has a Podcast ranked this season 23rd out of 30, with Rob Cesternino ranking this season 29th. This was updated in 2021 during Cesternino's podcast, Survivor All-Time Top 40 Rankings, ranking 26th out of 40. In 2020, Inside Survivor ranked this season 20th out of 40 saying that "the gameplay is completely baffling" but is "one of the most entertaining seasons of the show from a comedic perspective."

== Controversy ==
Survivor: Gabon received some minor criticism from the Parents Television Council for a brief, uncensored glimpse of Marcus's penis when the tip was partially exposed through the fly of his boxer shorts. The exposure occurred on the season opener during the second Immunity Challenge when Marcus raced alongside fellow contestants.
