= Miracle- =

Jordanian-Polish esports player (born 1997)

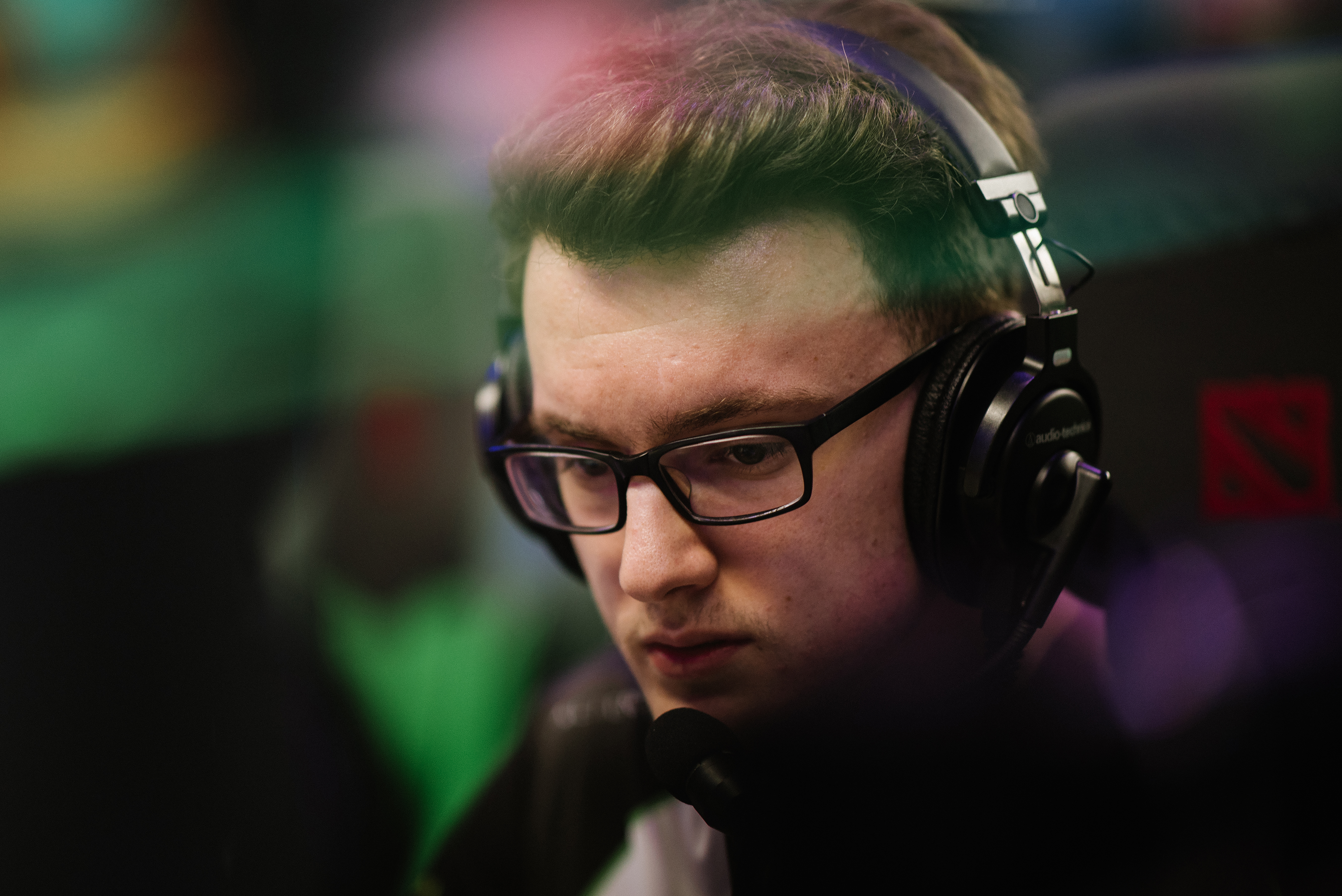
- Miracle in 2018
- Born: Amer Al-Barkawi; 20 June 1997 (age 29)
- Occupation: Professional gamer
- Years active: 2013–present

Current team
- Team: Nigma
- Role: Midlane; Carry
- Game: Dota 2

Team history
- 2015: Balkan Bears
- 2015: (monkey) Business
- 2015–2016: OG
- 2016–2019: Team Liquid
- 2019–present: Nigma Galaxy (Note: Known as Team Nigma from November 2019 to September 2021.)

Career highlights and awards
- The International champion (2017); 2× Major champion (Frankfurt, Manila)

Amer Al-Barkawi (Arabic: عامر البرقاوي; born 20 June 1997), better known as Miracle-, is a Jordanian-Polish professional Dota 2 player for Nigma Galaxy. He was a member of Team Liquid that won The International 2017.

== Career ==
Miracle-'s history with the multiplayer online battle arena genre began with Defense of the Ancients in the mid-2000s. Miracle- started playing Dota 2 as a "pubstar", meaning he did not play competitively, but was ranked highly in public matches. Miracle-'s first entry into the professional scene was with the Balkan Bears in early 2015, although he did not participate in any major tournament and left the team after only four months.

Later that year, Miracle- reached an in-game matchmaking rating (MMR) of over 8000; thus surpassing Aliwi "w33" Omar and becoming the highest ranked player. Miracle- was picked up by team (monkey) Business. Following a sponsorship deal, (monkey) Business reformed themselves as OG. Shortly following the rebranding, Miracle- and the team won the Frankfurt Major. Following a 7–8th-place finish in the Shanghai Major, Miracle- and OG won the Manila Major and ESL One Frankfurt 2016.

In March 2016, Miracle- became the first Dota 2 player to reach 9000 MMR. After placing 9–12th at The International 2016, Miracle- left OG as a free agent to join Team Liquid in September 2016. He, along with the rest of the team, won The International 2017, which had the largest prize pool of any esports tournament, winning nearly US$11 million in prize money. In November 2019, he and the rest of Team Liquid left to form their own organization, Nigma.

In April 2023, he played in place of Ammar "ATF" Al-Assaf at DreamLeague 19 before announcing his semi-retirement. Miracle‑ returned from break to stand in for Ammar "ATF" Al‑Assaf at DreamLeague Season 19 with Nigma Galaxy. In December 2023, he rejoined Nigma Galaxy's active roster after a year‑long hiatus, teaming up once more with Sumail and KuroKy. In June 2024, he represented the team at the 1win Series Dota 2 Summer tournament ($100 000 prize pool). In April 2025, he extended his competitive hiatus, remaining on Nigma Galaxy's bench due to personal reasons.
