= Team Liquid =

Dutch esports organization

- Short name: Liquid, TL
- Divisions: Age of Empires; Apex Legends; Artifact; Chess; Civilization VI; Clash Royale; Counter-Strike 2 Crossfire; Dota 2 EA Sports FC; Fortnite; Free Fire; Hearthstone; Heroes of the Storm; League of Legends; Mobile Legends: Bang Bang; Overwatch 2 Rocket League; PUBG; StarCraft II; Street Fighter; Super Smash Bros. Tekken 7 Tom Clancy's Rainbow Six Siege; Valorant; World of Warcraft
- Founded: 2000; 26 years ago
- Location: Utrecht, Netherlands; United States (LoL team); Americas (Counter-Strike team); Brazil (Crossfire team, Rainbow Six team, Free Fire team and Game Changers Valorant team); Europe (Alienware facility (Dota 2)); Indonesia (MLBB ID); The Philippines (MLBB PH)
- Manager: Victor Goossens (co-CEO); Steve Arhancet (co-CEO)
- Partners: Alienware; IMC Trading; HyperX; Jersey Mike's Subs; Marvel Entertainment; Monster Energy; Secretlab; SAP SE; Twitch
- Parent group: aXiomatic
- Website: www.teamliquid.com

Team Liquid (Dutch pronunciation: [ˈtim ˈlɪkʋɪt]) is a multi-regional professional esports organization based in the Netherlands that was founded in 2000. They signed their first professional players with the release of StarCraft II: Wings of Liberty.

In 2012, Team Liquid acquired a North American Dota 2 team, marking their first venture into multi-genre management. In January 2015, Team Liquid officially merged with Team Curse under the Liquid banner, bringing on Steve Arhancet, his supporting staff, and former Curse League of Legends, Street Fighter, and Super Smash Bros. teams. Their European Dota 2 squad won The International 2017, which had one of the largest prize pools for any esports tournament in history. Team Liquid's League of Legends team has won five LCS titles, and their Counter-Strike Global Offensive team was awarded the Intel Grand Slam prize in 2019 after winning four tournaments in just 63 days. Team Liquid also has Rainbow Six Siege, Free Fire and female Valorant teams in Brazil, Mobile Legends: Bang Bang rosters in Indonesia and the Philippines and chess grandmasters Fabiano Caruana, Magnus Carlsen and R Praggnanandhaa representing the organization.

== History ==
The website was released on May 1, 2001, by Victor "Nazgul" Goossens and Joy "Meat" Hoogeveen under the domain teamliquid.cjb.net. On September 22, 2002, the website was moved to the address of teamliquid.net. A day later the very first poll was posted as a vote for the website's name with the teamliquid.net name winning over other suggestions such as likwit.com. On April 5, 2019, it was announced that the website would be moving to the domain tl.net, with teamliquid.net becoming an alias for teamliquid.com in the future.

Although Team Liquid was primarily known as a StarCraft news site, there are many sub sections on the forums dedicated to other games as well. It was announced on August 30, 2012, that Team Liquid would be expanding to covering Dota 2 news. On December 8, 2012, Liquid expanded their esports franchise into multiple games for the first time, with the recruitment of a North American Dota 2 team.

On January 6, 2015, Steven "LiQuiD112" Arhancet joined Victor Goossens as co-owner of Team Liquid, officially commencing the merge between former Team Curse Gaming under the Team Liquid banner.

On September 27, 2016, Team Liquid sold its controlling interest to aXiomatic Gaming, an investment group including Golden State Warriors co-owner Peter Guber, entrepreneur Ted Leonsis, motivational speaker Tony Robbins, basketball Hall of Famer Magic Johnson, and AOL co-founder Steve Case.

On December 16, 2017, Team Liquid disbanded their Halo roster.

In 2020, the organization introduced Blue, an anthropomorphic horse, as its mascot. Blue has been featured in the organization's merchandising campaigns and collaborations.

== Ownership ==
aXiomatic
- Industry: Entertainment and sports
- Key people: Bruce Stein (CEO)
- Owner: Aerial Powers (co-owner); Asa Butterfield (co-owner); Jonathan Jablonowski (co-owner); Juan DeBiedma (co-owner); Lex Veldhuis (co-owner); Max Smith (co-owner)
- Website: www.axiomaticgaming.com

aXiomatic is an entertainment and sports management company. Investors for the group include Peter Guber, Tony Robbins, Magic Johnson, Ted Leonsis, Steve Case, and Eric Lefkofsky. The chief executive officer is Bruce Stein, the former chief executive officer and chief operating officer of Mattel Toys, Sony Interactive Entertainment and Kenner Products (Hasbro). On September 27, 2016, aXiomatic announced that it had acquired controlling interest of esports organization Team Liquid.

Other investors include Los Angeles Dodgers executives Lon Rosen and Tucker Kain, Golden State Warriors executives Rick Welts and Kirk Lacob, the Washington Nationals owners at Lerner Enterprises, Chicago Cubs president of business operations Crane Kenney, Donn Davis, co-founder of Revolution and managing partner of Revolution Growth, Zach Leonsis, VP and general manager of Monumental Sports Network, Mark Ein, founder and owner of the Washington Kastles and Washington Justice, and former NFL player Dhani Jones.

It was announced that Victor Goossens and Steve Arhancet would continue their roles as co-CEOs of Team Liquid after the acquisition.

In December 2021, five players signed by Team Liquid became co-owners: basketball player Aerial Powers, amateur Super Smash Bros. player (and actor) Asa "Stimpy" Butterfield, Counter-Strike: Global Offensive player Jonathan "EliGE" Jablonowski, Super Smash Bros. player Juan "Hungrybox' DeBiedma, and poker streamer and competitor Lex Veldhuis.

In January 2022, Team Liquid signed the World of Warcraft guild Limit, making Limit's guild leader and team captain Max "Maximum" Smith a co-owner.

In May 2024, it was announced that Team Liquid was a member of the Esports World Cup Foundation Club Support Program, funded by the Saudi Arabian Public Investment Fund. Later that same month, Team Liquid would sign two Mobile Legends: Bang Bang rosters in the form of AURA Esports and ECHO (renamed to Liquid AURA and Liquid ECHO, then to Team Liquid Indonesia and Team Liquid Philippines respectively), after they acquired STUN.GG, who owned both teams.

On May 9, 2025, Team Liquid acquired EA Sports FC organization Team Gullit, owned by former Dutch football player and manager Ruud Gullit. Liquid and Gullit were previously involved in a partnership during the 2024 Esports World Cup.

== Websites ==
=== Main websites ===
- TLnet – Originally branded as "Team Liquid", the tl.net website primarily provides StarCraft II coverage but also has some coverage for StarCraft Brood War, Counter-Strike Global Offensive, Heroes of the Storm, and Super Smash Brothers Melee. With the launch of StarCraft II, TLnet has grown into the largest StarCraft community on the internet, with over 220,000 active members and over twenty four million total posts. The website employs four person full-time staff at their New York City office to work on the site.
- Team Liquid – Website focusing on Team Liquid esports team coverage.
- Liquipedia – Is a volunteer-run wiki covering various esports, beginning with Starcraft: Brood War and currently covering more than 57 esports titles. In 2023 Liquipedia started to branch into covering traditional sports with their Formula 1 wiki. In 2024, Liquipedia would host the game-focused Dota 2 Wiki, which previously was hosted on Fandom, with an intent to merge both the esports wiki and the game wiki into a single, comprehensive Dota 2 wiki.

== Rosters ==
Team Liquid rosters

Starcraft 2
Handle	Name	Nationality
Clem	Desplanches, Clément	France
Elazer	Ogonowski, Mikołaj	Poland
Cure	Doh-wook, Kim	South Korea
MaNa	Komincz, Grzegorz	Poland
SKillous	Gurevich, Nikita	Russia

League of Legends
Handle	Name	Nationality
Morgan	Ru-han, Park	South Korea
Josedeodo	Villegas, Brandon Joel	Argentina
Quid	Hyeon-seung, Lim	South Korea
Yeon	Sung, Sean	United States
CoreJJ	Yong-in, Jo	South Korea

Counter-Strike 2
Handle	Name	Nationality
NAF	Markovic, Keith	Canada
EliGE	Jablonowski, Jonathan	United States
malbsMd	Samayoa, Mario	Guatemala
JT	Theodosiou, Ioannis 'Johnny'	South Africa
Jorko	Mitev, Georgi	Bulgaria

Dota 2
Handle	Name	Nationality
miCKe	Vu, Michael	Sweden
Nisha	Jankowski, Michał	Poland
Wisper	Dobles, Adrián	Bolivia
Boxi	Svahn, Samuel	Sweden
tOfu	Engel, Erik	Germany

Super Smash Bros.
Handle	Name	Nationality
Chillindude	Khan, Kashan	United States
Ken	Hoang, Ken	United States
Hungrybox	DeBiedma, Juan	United States
ChuDat	Rodriguez, Daniel	United States

Mobile Legends: Bang Bang ID
Handle	Name	Nationality
Aran	Aldhia Fahmi Aranda	Indonesia
Kyou	Risky	Indonesia
Kevinn	Yonathan Chin	Indonesia
Drichel	Andric Alfayyadh	Indonesia
Lyoni	M Rio Adi Wijaya	Indonesia
Aredlavv	Valdera Alvaro Tanto	Indonesia
Faviannn (I)	Favian Bayu Putra	Indonesia
AeronnShikii (I)	Sultan Muhammad	Indonesia
Widy (I)	Christian Widy Hartono	Indonesia

Mobile Legends: Bang Bang PH
Handle	Name	Nationality
Sanford	Sanford Vinuya	Philippines
KarlTzy	Karl Gabriel Nepomuceno	Philippines
Sanji	Alston Pabico	Philippines
Teddyqt	Dave Viaña	Philippines
Jaypee	Jaypee Dela Cruz	Philippines

Rainbow Six Siege
Handle	Name	Nationality
Kheyze	Zanello, Diego	Brazil
Jv92	Vitor, João	Brazil
Felipox	Gusmão De Lucia, Felipe	Brazil
Nade	Sá Ferreira, Felipe	Brazil
Maia	Araujo Maia, Gabriel	Brazil

Valorant Champions Tour
Handle	Name	Nationality
kamo	Frąckowiak, Kamil	Poland
nAts	Akhmetshin, Ayaz	Russia
purp0	Borchev, Semyon	Russia
MiniBoo	Lukaševičius, Dominykas	Lithuania
wayne	Chang, Wayne	Singapore

Valorant Game Changers
Handle	Name	Nationality
daiki	Vilela, Natalia	Brazil
Bizerra	Vieira, Vitoria	Brazil
Joojina	Paiva, Letícia	Brazil
isaa	Esser, Isabeli	Brazil
Jelly	Iris, Julia	Brazil

Apex Legends
Handle	Name	Nationality
Zer0	Perry, Rhys	Australia
Sikezz	Odom, Nicholas	United States
Panic	Arthur, Nathaniel	United States

Quake Champions
Handle	Name	Nationality
rapha	Hendrixson, Shane	United States

Legend:
- (I) Inactive
- (S) Suspended
- (L) On loan
- (2W) Two-way player
- Substitute
- (injured) Injury / Illness

== Tournaments and events ==
In addition to running a community site and team, Team Liquid also hosts a variety of tournaments and events.

=== Team Liquid Starleague ===
The two iterations of the TeamLiquid Starleague (or TSL for short) have been the largest StarCraft: Brood War tournaments outside of South Korea. The first TSL sponsored by Razer in 2008 was highly anticipated at the time, sporting all of the world's top Brood War players. It was topped one year later with 2009's TSL 2, which featured a total prize pool of over $20,000 and remains the largest non-Korean Brood War tournament to date. With the release of Starcraft II, Team Liquid announced a third installment, sponsored again by PokerStrategy.com with a prize pool of $34,700. The tournament took place between March and May 2011. On April 25, 2012, a fourth installment was announced (TSL 4).

=== Team Liquid StarCraft II Open ===
The TL Opens are one-day open single-elimination tournaments alternating between the NA and EU battle.net servers. The eight TL Open events that led up to the TSL 3 also served as a qualifier for the TSL.

=== Team Liquid Legacy Starleague ===
Announced on January 1, 2013, Team Liquid would be hosting a series of online tournaments for "foreign" players of StarCraft: Brood War.

=== Community events ===
- TL Attack: Modeled after a Korean TV show called Bnet Attack, a professional player plays games against non-professionals while chatting with the hosts.
- Liquibition: A King-of-the-Hill mode that is played best of 7 games.
- TL Arena: A professional player will be matched up with inferior opponents. With each win he gains, another handicap is added that limits his game play options, until he loses or he has defeated a certain number of opponents.

== Esports history ==
=== StarCraft and StarCraft II ===
The gaming clan "Liquid" was founded by Victor "Nazgul" Goossens near the end of 2000, after he decided to leave his previous clan. Liquid started with four members for the first months and grew to eight players over the following year. The members of the Liquid clan were handpicked by Goossens.

With the arrival of StarCraft II, Team Liquid announced plans to become an active professional esports team. Shortly after, sponsorship by The Little App Factory was announced, which qualified them as a sponsored professional team. This allowed Team Liquid to pay their players a salary and send the team to events around the world. The team created a dedicated news site separate from the more community oriented site, announced and released on May 10, 2011.

On August 13, 2012, three players traveled to Korea in order to live in the OGS training house and compete in GOMTV's Global StarCraft II League (GSL). Of the three players entering the preliminaries, only one, Dario "TLO" Wünsch qualified for the first two GSL events. He was eliminated out in the Second and First rounds respectively.

The third GSL was the strongest showing of Team Liquid thus far. Three players, Hayder "Haypro" Hussein, Jos "Ret" de Kroon and Jonathan "Jinro" Walsh qualified for the main tournament. While Hussein lost first round and de Kroon in 2nd, Walsh made to the semi-finals, losing 0–4 to the eventual winner Jang "MC" Min-Chul.

In 2012, during GSL Season 2, members Song "HerO" Hyeon Deok and Yun "TaeJa" Young Seo made it to the Round of 8 of the Code S tournament, with TaeJa being eliminated while HerO advanced to the semi-finals of the tournament.

At the end of 2023, Kim "Cure" Doh-wook and Clément "Clem" Desplanches reached the semifinals of ESL SC2 Masters: Winter 2023 Finals, at Dreamhack Atlanta. Cure lost to Dark 3-1 while Clem defeated Serral 3-1 and reached the finals. In the grand final, Clem competed against Dark and beat him 4-1.

At the start of 2024, Kim "Cure" Doh-wook was eliminated in the Round of 8 of Master's Coliseum 7, losing 3-4 against Solar.

In February 2024, Clément "Clem" Desplanches reached the Quarterfinals in IEM Katowice 2024 but lost 3-0 against Serral.

In February 2024, Kim "Cure" Doh-wook reached the Semifinals in IEM Katowice 2024 but lost 3-0 against Maru.

Clément "Clem" Desplanches has assured his direct spot in the Esports World Cup 2024 in Riyadh by winning SC2 Masters Winter 2023.

Kim "Cure" Doh-wook has assured his direct spot in the Esports World Cup 2024 in Riyadh by reaching top 4 at IEM Katowice 2024.

Both Clément "Clem" Desplanches and Kim "Cure" Doh-wook stopped in the Knockout Round 3 of ESL SC2 Masters: Spring 2024. Clem lost 3-0 to HerO while Cure lost 3-2 to Shin.

=== Smash Bros. ===
In March 2014, Team Liquid announced that it had picked up two Melee players: Ken, who is known as the "King of Smash" and KoreanDJ, who is known for being the first player to defeat Mew2King during his peak, thus starting its Smash team. After acquiring Curse Gaming, it also signed Hungrybox, who is considered to be one of the Five Gods of Melee, and Chillin, who was the first player to defeat Ken during his prime. On August 11, 2015, it picked up top Super Smash Bros. for Wii U player Nairo, who was the only player to knock ZeRo out of a tournament, ending ZeRo's 56 consecutive tournament win streak at MLG World Finals. On September 28, 2015, Team Liquid announced that KoreanDJ resigned from the organization and retired from competitive Smash, citing persistent hand and wrist pains.

=== League of Legends ===
On January 6, 2015, Liquid acquired the Team Curse's League of Legends roster, which consisted of Quas, IWillDominate, Voyboy, Cop, and Xpecial. The team finished the LCS Spring regular season in 6th place with a 10–9 record. On Week 5 and 6 of NA LCS Piglet was benched and replaced on the starting roster by KEITHMCBRIEF in an effort to try to improve their standings. In the playoffs they beat Counter Logic Gaming 3–0, before losing to Cloud9 3–2 and finishing in 3rd.

Team Liquid was very successful in 2018 and 2019, winning four LCS splits in a row. In the 2018 NA LCS season, Liquid had a roster of Impact, Xmithie, Pobelter, Doublelift, and Olleh. At the 2018 League of Legends World Championship, Liquid went 3–3 in groups and failed to advance. In the 2019 LCS season, Liquid replaced Pobelter with Jensen and Olleh with CoreJJ. Liquid failed to make it out of groups at the 2019 League of Legends World Championship, however, as their 3–3 record was insufficient to advance. In 2020, Broxah joined the team as jungler, replacing Xmithie. The 2020 Spring Split went very poorly for Liquid; they finished ninth place out of ten. Doublelift was benched due to motivation issues and replaced by Academy ADC Tactical, and Doublelift was eventually traded to Team SoloMid for the summer split, with Tactical promoted to starter. Liquid finished third that summer split and made it to 2020 League of Legends World Championship, but again their 3–3 record was insufficient to advance to the quarterfinals. In 2021, Santorin replaced Broxah as jungler, and LEC import Alphari replaced Impact as top laner. The team once again got a 3–3 record in groups at the 2021 League of Legends World Championship; this qualified them for a tiebreaker match with Gen.G, but Liquid lost and failed to advance.

The 2022 season saw a major shake-up of the roster, as the Honda sponsorship allowed the creation of a "super team" of Bwipo, Santorin, Bjergsen, Hans Sama, and CoreJJ. Despite high expectations and finishing third place in the regular season of the summer split, Liquid narrowly failed to earn a Worlds slot in the playoffs, a disappointment that caused a major controversy. Hans Sama left the team at the end of the season. On 26 September 2022 they also released Guilhoto from the head coach position.

=== Other ===
One week after the Curse merger, it was announced that Team Liquid acquired a Counter Strike: Global Offensive team that previously played under the title "Denial eSports".

On October 9, 2015, it was announced that Liquid would once again be fielding a Dota team, after being absence from the competitive DotA scene for more than a year.

On October 21, 2016, it was announced that Liquid would be fielding a professional Civilization VI team, captained by former world champion Civilization player MrGameTheory.

On August 7, 2020, Team Liquid announced their entrance to the Valorant esports scene by signing the fish123 roster, soulcas, Kryptix, L1NK, ec1s. Alongside these four players, they also added ScreaM as the fifth player. On February 24, 2021, Team Liquid parted ways with ec1s and added Jamppi into the roster. On April 23, 2021, Team Liquid announced changes to their Dota 2 roster on Twitter. Samuel "Boxi" Swann is taking a break from Dota to spend more time with his family. He will be replaced by Saeed Samail "SumaiL" Hassan. On December 25, 2021, analyst and translator Leon "Arthur" Lee interviewed Team Liquid coach, William "Blitz" Lee, who talked about the formation of the team, MATUMBAMAN and Zai, captain iNSaNiA and opponents at the Dota Pro Circuit. On 22 September 2022, they were announced as one of the 10 partner teams for the Valorant EMEA league.

On May 5, 2023, Team Liquid became the first Dota 2 team to score the minimum number of DPC points and qualify for The International 2023.

On November 21, 2023, Team Liquid announced its departure from Rocket League.

In May 2024, Team Liquid announced it was officially re-entering competitive Apex Legends play after signing the orgless team "Legacy" ahead of the 2024 Apex Legends Global Series (ALGS) Split 1 Playoffs LAN. It marked Team Liquid's return to the Apex scene, after leaving in December 2022. The roster is made up of Saul "YanYa" Ocampo, Luis Enrique "Neazul" Ramos Suarez, Alexis "Jaguares" Martinez, and Steven "Pistillo" Rojas as the coach.

On January 17, 2025, Team Liquid announced its re-entering into Overwatch 2 Esports before the start of the Overwatch Champions Series (OWCS) 2025 season as a Partner team after a seven and a half year hiatus from Overwatch Esports. The Team started with the signing of KNIFE, Tr33, Infekted, Rupal, And Vega for Stage 1. Then would add Zerruh to their roster before stage 2. KNIFE would leave before Stage 3. The team is coached by Cas Van "Casores" Andel, assisted by Danny "Danny" Mychakov

On February 13, 2025, Team Liquid entered chess by signing American grandmaster Fabiano Caruana. The next day, on February 14, Liquid signed the Norwegian grandmaster Magnus Carlsen. On June 28, Liquid announced the signing of Indian grandmaster R Praggnanandhaa. These players represented Liquid during the Champions Chess Tour 2025.

== Sponsors ==
On January 24, 2015, it was announced that HTC had become an official sponsor of Team Liquid.

In June 2022, Liquid partnered with Honda as a title sponsor for their League of Legends team, with the team renamed "Team Liquid Honda". On 19 May 2025, Liquid announced that their partnership with Honda had ended due to a social media controversy where Rainbow Six player Lucas "DiasLucasBr" Dias posted an image of an atomic bomb on X, referencing the bombings of Hiroshima and Nagasaki during World War II, after losing to Japanese team CAG Osaka. Although DiasLucasBr deleted the post and apologized to the CAG Osaka members, American Honda Motor Company issued a statement terminating the sponsorship after "deeming the conduct to be incompatible with Honda corporate values and unacceptable".

== Management ==
Victor "Nazgul" Goossens is a founding member, and currently co-owner and chief executive officer of Team Liquid. He originally competed in Brood War prior to forming Team Liquid.

Steve "LiQuiD112" Arhancet joined the Team Liquid staff when Team Curse merged with Team Liquid. Since the merge, Steve has taken the role of co-owner and chief executive officer and primarily manages the League of Legends team.

== Alienware Training Facility ==
In 2017 Team Liquid finished constructing its Alienware Training Facility in Los Angeles, which is designed to act as the training grounds for Team Liquid's CS:GO and League of Legends teams, as well as their esports headquarters. The facility houses non-players such as owner Steve "LiQuiD112" Arhancet and 1UP Studios, Team Liquid's in-house production studio, so that all departments of Team Liquid could work together. Team Liquid's sponsor Alienware supplied all the PC's to the Alienware Training Facility.

== See also ==
- Team Liquid PH

Awards and achievements
Preceded by Wings Gaming	The International winner 2017; With: MATUMBAMAN, Miracle-, MinD_ContRoL, GH, KuroKy, and Heen (coach)	Succeeded by OG
Preceded by Team Spirit	The International winner 2024; With: miCKe, Nisha, 33, Boxi, Insania, Blitz (coach), Jabbz (coach), and kpii (coach)	Succeeded by Team Falcons
