= Stormgate =

2025 video game

- Developer: Frost Giant Studios
- Composer: Frank Klepacki
- Engine: Unreal Engine 5
- Platform: Windows
- Release: August 5, 2025
- Genre: Real-time strategy
- Modes: Single-player, multiplayer

Stormgate is a 2025 real-time strategy video game developed by Frost Giant Studios for Microsoft Windows.

== Gameplay ==
Stormgate is a real-time strategy game set in a post-apocalyptic world. As is typical for the genre, players gather resources from a top-down perspective while simultaneously constructing bases, building up troops, upgrading units and buildings, and attacking enemy forces. The game is free-to-play with free and monetized content. It was developed to make a typically complex genre accessible to new audiences while providing the option of balanced, competitive one-on-ones for more advanced players.

At the heart of these innovations is the so-called "Buddy Bot", an optional and modularly customizable AI assistant. This bot was specifically designed to lower the typical entry barrier of macro-management for beginners and casual players. Players can configure the Buddy Bot to handle routine background tasks independently - such as training workers, constructing supply structures, or producing units. By doing so, the system relieves the burden of multi-tasking and high actions per minute (APM), allowing players to focus more heavily on strategic map navigation and direct unit micro-management. To maintain fairness in competitive play, the helper is strictly limited to single-player, cooperative modes (such as 3-player co-op), and non-ranked matches; it is not active in traditional 1v1 ranked play. In addition to the Buddy Bot, Stormgate features fluid control schemes and automated control groups, among other improvements.

== Factions ==
- Vanguard: Forms the ultimate defense alliance of humanity in Stormgate and stands out in gameplay due to extreme adaptability and technological efficiency. A core mechanic is the Veteran System, which allows surviving units to gain experience and receive additional health points. Furthermore, their robotic worker units ("B.O.B.s" / Servos) master automation, enabling multiple units to construct buildings together and accelerate production. The troops demonstrate strategic versatility through flexible transformation options, such as the Scout Post, which can take on five different defensive forms depending on the crew inside.
- Infernal Host: Represents a demonic, intergalactic race of conquerors in Stormgate that relies on numbers, mass, and sacrificial swarm tactics. Central gameplay mechanics include the Shroud, a magical fog that grants friendly units temporary shield health points. Instead of utilizing classic production times, troops are summoned almost instantly via charge-based production directly from the portal network. Additionally, the faction harvests the exclusive Animus resource from fallen souls, which is spent to cast powerful rituals and summon apocalyptic apex units like the Flayed Dragon.
- Celestial Armada: A technologically advanced civilization of enlightened energy beings that acts as protectors against cataclysmic threats. They completely bypass classic worker units for base construction, instead materializing structures directly from orbit via an energetic cascade field. Furthermore, their warfare revolves around a centralized power network that buffs the army when overloaded, combining biological-nanotech entities with robotic units.

== Free-To-Play Model ==
The game offers all game modes for free, including three prologue campaign missions, unlimited 1v1 ranked matches, and a three-player co-op mode against AI. Additionally, players can purchase optional content. These paid expansions include additional campaign chapters with three story-driven missions each (now bundled as one purchase called Stormgate - Ashes of Earth Campaign), unlockable hero progression for the co-op mode, and cosmetic pets.

== Development ==
Former Blizzard developers Tim Morten and Tim Campbell founded Frost Giant Studios in October 2020 with intention to build an accessible real-time strategy game. Morten previously was StarCraft II: Legacy of the Void's production lead, and Campbell had been Warcraft III: The Frozen Throne's campaign lead designer. They raised nearly $5 million in seed funding, an additional $5 million in March 2021, and $25 million in its January 2022 Series A funding. Frost Giant debuted Stormgate in June 2022. A closed beta started during December 2023. Stormgate became available for early access on Steam on July 30, 2024, and was fully released on August 5, 2025.

Following its release, Stormgate received a continuous series of updates and patches aimed at refining gameplay, expanding content, and improving performance. Frost Giant Studios implemented a responsive update cycle that included technical optimizations to the Snowplay engine, regular balance adjustments across factions, and ongoing improvements to campaign missions, user interface clarity, and audio design.

A notable milestone in the game's post-release development was the introduction of a collaborative community patch phase. Developed over several months in close partnership between Frost Giant developers and dedicated community creators, this initiative - among other things - integrated over 40 community-designed maps, expanded faction unit rosters with four new units, added ranked ladder modes like a 2v2 competitive playlist, and delivered tools for custom content creators to support the game's ecosystem.

In April 2026, Frost Giant announced that the game would discontinue online support and issue an offline patch, due to its host having been acquired by an artificial intelligence company and permanently ceasing its game server services as a result. Alongside the offline patch, further quality-of-life and performance updates were released, most notably improving general performance by 30%. Online services are to be brought back at some point in the future.

== Reception ==
Reception

Aggregate score
Aggregator	Score
OpenCritic	75/100 (Note: Based on 6 reviews)

Stormgate received a score of 75/100 on OpenCritic, while scoring 74/100 on Metacritic.

Among other things, GameStar praised the action-packed yet highly readable battles, the intuitive gameplay, and the three clearly defined factions. The campaign is said to be "pleasantly challenging" and the overarching storyline interesting. The metaprogression was also highlighted positively, while the somewhat stiff dialogue was criticized.

Multiplayer.it called Stormgate "a mix of old and new that works... very accessible for novices, very stimulating for veterans". The review praised, among other things, the varied, well-balanced units and the controls.

Reviewing Stormgate for IGN, Leana Hafer wrote: "Stormgate still has a long road ahead of it, but it's already a special game, combining the familiar and the fresh into a satisfying RTS experience."
