= Reynor =

Reynor is a surname. Notable people with the surname include:

- Jack Reynor (born 1992), Irish actor
- John Reynor (born 1964), Irish soccer player

== See also ==
- Reyner
