= Liquipedia =

Esports encyclopedia website

- Screenshot Liquipedia's desktop homepage
- Website type: Online encyclopedia
- Founded: 2006
- Owner: Team Liquid
- Key people: Erik Saler (head)
- Website: liquipedia.net
- Users: 38 million

Liquipedia is an online encyclopedia focused on esports. It is affiliated with U.S. and Netherlands-based esports team Team Liquid. Founded in 2006, it is the largest esports knowledge database in the world and covers over sixty different games including Counter-Strike, League of Legends, and Dota 2. The website covers tournament details and standings, player biographies, and team listings.

== History ==
The website was founded in 2006, originally to educate people on the best builds in StarCraft: Brood War.

The website expanded to League of Legends in 2017. In 2022, OVHcloud partnered with the website, providing it with cloud servers to run on. An app version of the encyclopedia was also released in October of that year. In 2023, it expanded to regular sports through Formula One, after noticing the large overlap between fans of the sport and esports. Liquipedia plans on furthering its reach to more traditional sports. In 2024, it began hosting the Dota 2 wiki, after its move from Fandom. This was the first general gaming wiki on the website, away from esports. Liquipedia said that they were "open to hosting more gaming wikis in the future."
