= Victor Goossens =

Dutch esports player

Personal details
- Born: 3 May 1983 (age 42) Utrecht, Netherlands

Victor "Nazgul" Goossens (Dutch pronunciation: [ˈvɪktɔr ˈɣoːsəns]; born 3 May 1983) is a Dutch retired professional StarCraft: Brood War player. He is the founder and co-owner of the multiregional professional esports organization Team Liquid.

== Career ==
Goossens began playing StarCraft in 1998 soon after release. At the age of 17, he founded Team Liquid's original website as dedicated fandom to StarCraft with no business intention in mind. After finishing high school he moved to South Korea with the intent of becoming a professional StarCraft player. He struggled financially with many tournaments paying only $50 to $100. He returned to the Netherlands and supported himself through poker.

Between 2002 and 2012, the website grew to a company which became one of esports biggest franchises. Team Liquid is estimated by Forbes to be worth $200 million. Goossens expanded Team Liquid to other games including Dota 2, a game which he supported since 2015. Goossens announced that Team Liquid was disbanding their Dota 2 team in 2019, the same team which won The International 7 in 2017.
