= The Smash Brothers =

2013 video game documentary

- Poster for the film depicting the players profiled in the series.
- Directed by: Travis Beauchamp
- Screenplay by: Travis Beauchamp
- Music by: Huw Williams; Kevin Kelbach; Travis Beauchamp
- Production company: East Point Pictures
- Release date: 2013
- Country: United States
- Language: English

The Smash Brothers is a 2013 nine-part documentary series written and directed by Travis 'Samox' Beauchamp. The documentary series examines the history of the competitive Super Smash Bros. community, in particular the game Super Smash Bros. Melee and seven of the most dominant players throughout its history up to that point: Christopher "Azen" McMullen, Joel "Isai" Alvarado, Ken "Ken" Hoang, Christopher "PC Chris" Szygiel, Daniel "KoreanDJ" Jung, Jason "Mew2King" Zimmerman, and Joseph "Mango" Marquez. The film also features extensive commentary from other community figures including Chris "Wife" Fabiszak, Wynton "Prog" Smith, Kashan "Chillindude" Khan, Antoine "Wes" Lewis-Hall, Daniel "ChuDat" Rodriguez, Juan "Hungrybox" Debiedma, and Lillian "Milktea" Chen. The series was crowdfunded through Kickstarter, receiving US$8,910. The series had a total budget of US$12,000. The series has received a combined total of over 10 million views on YouTube.

== Overview ==
The documentary is split into nine parts in chronological order, with each part except the first and the last profiling a notable Melee player.

Episode	Title	Summary
Part 1	Show Me Your Moves	Introduction to the documentary and overview of competitive Melee.
Part 2	No Johns	Follows the career of Christopher "Azen" McMullen.
Part 3	Don't Get Hit	Follows the career of Joel "Isai" Alvarado.
Part 4	The King of Smash	Follows the career of Ken "Ken" Hoang.
Part 5	Revolution	Follows the career of Christopher "PC Chris" Szygiel.
Part 6	Paper Cuts	Follows the career of Daniel "KoreanDJ" Jung.
Part 7	The Robot	Follows the career of Jason "Mew2King" Zimmerman.
Part 8	The Natural	Follows the career of Joseph "Mango" Marquez.
Part 9	Game!	Describes the EVO 2013 fundraiser, Nintendo's subsequent decision to block the tournament from streaming, and the eventual overruling and successful participation of Melee.

== Development ==
Beauchamp played Smash Bros. from an early age, and was inspired to create the documentary series after learning about the lives of professional players. The pilot episode was shot in the summer of 2011. The documentary took over two years to make. Beauchamp quit his job to work on it full-time. He was able to interview all of the players he profiled in the series except for Azen.

== Reception and legacy ==
The documentary series was well received by fans and game critics alike who praised its high production value, unusual for most fan films.

The documentary has been credited with leading to a renewed interest in competitive Melee tournaments. Due to the success of the series, Samox announced a spin-off documentary called Metagame, set to expand on the stories of Swedish smasher, Adam "Armada" Lindgren, America's Kevin "PPMD" Nanney, and others, The documentary premiered on a Twitch livestream from December 11–13, 2020.
