= List of esports players =

This is a list of esports players. This is not a complete list of all active, professional esports players, but rather a consolidation of the most influential or significant. The list does not include online poker or online chess players, since they are usually separated from esports.

== Notable players ==
Nickname	Real name	Country	Team	Game(s)	Career
Thor	Thor Aackerlund	United States	Camerica (spokesperson), considered to be one of the first professional gamers	Tetris, Nintendo World Championships	1990
pindaPanda	Pinda Rika Dorji	Bhutan		Dota 2	2016–present
Crimsix	Ian Porter	United States	Dallas Empire	Call of Duty	2012–present
JJoNak	Bang Seong-hyun	South Korea	New York Excelsior	Overwatch	2017–present
Seagull	Brandon Larned	United States	Dallas Fuel	Overwatch	2016–2018
sinatraa	Jay Won	United States	Sentinels	Valorant	2019–present
xQc	Félix Lengyel	Canada	Gladiators Legion	Overwatch	2016–present
Scarlett	Sasha Hostyn	Canada	Brave Star Gaming	StarCraft II	2011–present
Park Se-jun	Park Se-jun	South Korea	SK Telecom T1	Pokémon	2014–present
Svenskeren	Dennis Johnsen	Denmark	Evil Geniuses	League of Legends	2011–present
Dardoch	Joshua Hartnett	United States	Team SoloMid	League of Legends	2014–present
Aphromoo	Zaqueri Black	United States	Dignitas	League of Legends	2011–present
Nadeshot	Matthew Haag	United States	100 Thieves	Call of Duty	2007–2015
Ray Rizzo	Ray Rizzo	United States		Pokémon	2010–2015
JJu	Byun Eun-jong	South Korea	Samsung Khan	StarCraft	2002–2007
KillCreek	Stevie Case	United States		Quake	1998–?
FreeDoM	Chang Yong-suk	South Korea	Samsung Khan	StarCraft, Warcraft III	2003–2007
HeatoN	Emil Christensen	Sweden	Ninjas in Pyjamas	Counter-Strike	2001–2007
Ferrari_430	Luo Feichi	China		Defense of the Ancients, Dota 2	2010–2016
Jaedong	Lee Jae-dong	South Korea	Evil Geniuses	StarCraft: Brood War, StarCraft II	2007–present
moon	Jang Jae-ho	South Korea		Warcraft III, StarCraft II	2003–2013
Dendi	Danylo Ishutin	Ukraine	Natus Vincere	Defense of the Ancients, Dota 2	2007–present
MaDFroG	Fredrik Johansson	Sweden		Warcraft III	2001–2011
Vo0	Sander Kaasjager	Netherlands		Painkiller, Quake III, Quake 4, Quake Champions, World of Warcraft	2004–present
Mighty Mouse	Demetrious Johnson	United States	Method Gaming	World of Warcraft	2017–present
av3k	Maciej Krzykowski	Poland	Millenium	Quake series	2006–present
f0rest	Patrik Lindberg	Sweden	Ninjas in Pyjamas	Counter-Strike, Counter-Strike: Global Offensive	2005–2024
GeT RiGhT	Christopher Alesund	Sweden	Ninjas in Pyjamas	Counter-Strike, Counter-Strike: Global Offensive	2007–2021
friberg	Adam Friberg	Sweden	Heroic	Counter-Strike: Source, Counter-Strike: Global Offensive	2012–present
Xizt	Richard Landström	Sweden	Fnatic	Counter-Strike, Counter-Strike: Global Offensive	2010–present
allu	Aleksi Jalli	Finland	ENCE eSports	Counter-Strike, Counter-Strike: Global Offensive	2013–present
rebko	Jonas Jerebko	Sweden	Renegades	Counter-Strike: Global Offensive	2016–present
HuK	Chris Loranger	United States/Canada	Boston Uprising	Overwatch	2017–present
ToD	Yoan Merlo	France	Fnatic	Warcraft III, StarCraft II	2002–2013
MC	Jang Min-chul	South Korea		StarCraft: Brood War, StarCraft II	2010–2015
Ogre2	Tom Ryan	United States	Counter Logic Gaming	Halo series, Call of Duty	
Daigo	Daigo Umehara	Japan	Mildom Beast	Street Fighter (series)	
Grubby	Manuel Schenkhuizen	Netherlands		Warcraft III, StarCraft II	
July	Park Sung-joon	South Korea	StarTale	StarCraft, StarCraft II	
bds	Andreas Thorstensson	Sweden		Counter-Strike	
Walshy	David Walsh	United States		Halo 2, Halo 3	
Jinro	Jonathan Walsh	Sweden	Team Liquid	StarCraft II	2010–2012
Fly100%	Lu Weiliang	China		Warcraft III	
Fatal1ty	Johnathan Wendel	United States		Quake III, Unreal Tournament 2003, Painkiller, Quake 4	
JWong	Justin Wong	United States	Evil Geniuses	Fighting games	
BoxeR	Lim Yo-hwan	South Korea	SlayerS	StarCraft, StarCraft II	
FlaSh	Lee Young-ho	South Korea		StarCraft	2001–2015
NaDa	Lee Yun-yeol	South Korea		StarCraft: Brood War, StarCraft II	2001–2012
infi	Wang Xuwen	China	ViCi Gaming	Warcraft III, StarCraft II	
Ken	Ken Hoang	United States	Team Liquid	Super Smash Bros. Melee	2003–2007, 2012–present
Hungrybox	Juan Debiedma	United States	Team Liquid	Super Smash Bros. Melee, Project M, Super Smash Bros. Ultimate	2007–present
Armada	Adam Lindgren	Sweden	Alliance	Super Smash Bros. Melee, Project M	2007-2018
Mango	Joseph Marquez	United States	Cloud9	Super Smash Bros. Melee, Project M	
PPMD	Kevin Nanney	United States	Golden Guardians	Super Smash Bros. Melee, Project M	2009–2016
Mew2King	Jason Zimmerman	United States	COGnitive Gaming, Most Valuable Gaming	Super Smash Bros. Melee, Project M, Super Smash Bros. for Wii U	2005-2021
Leffen	William Hjelte	Sweden	Team SoloMid	Super Smash Bros. Melee, Super Smash Bros. Ultimate	2010–present
Isai	Isai Alvarado	United States		Super Smash Bros. 64, Super Smash Bros. Melee	2003–2014, 2016–Present
Westballz	Weston Dennis	United States		Super Smash Bros. Melee	2010–Present
Plup	Justin McGrath	United States	Panda Global	Super Smash Bros. Melee, Project M, Super Smash Bros. for Wii U	2010–Present
ZeRo	Gonzalo Barrios	Chile		Super Smash Bros. for Wii U	2014–2020
Nairo	Nairoby Quezada	United States		Super Smash Bros. for Wii U, Super Smash Bros. Ultimate	2010–present
PC Chris	Christopher Szygiel	United States		Super Smash Bros. Melee	2005–2015
Zain	Zain Naghmi	United States	Golden Guardians	Super Smash Bros. Melee	2014–present
Axe	Jeffrey Williamson	United States	Tempo Storm	Super Smash Bros. Melee	2009–present
Ludwig	Ludwig Ahgren	United States		Super Smash Bros. Melee	2017–present
Glutonny	William Belaïd	France	Solary	Super Smash Bros. Ultimate	2009–present
Marss	Tyler Martins	United States	Panda Global	Super Smash Bros. Ultimate	2014–present
MkLeo	Leonardo López Pérez	Mexico	T1	Super Smash Bros. Ultimate	2009–present
Tweek	Gavin Dempsey	United States	Team SoloMid	Super Smash Bros. Ultimate	2014–present
Samsora	Ezra Samsora Morris	United States		Super Smash Bros. Ultimate	2016–2021
SuperGirlKels	Kelsy Medeiros	Canada		Super Smash Bros. for Wii U, Super Smash Bros. Ultimate	2014–present
Zackray	Sota Okada	Japan	GameWith	Super Smash Bros. Ultimate	2017–present
Dabuz	Samuel Buzby	United States	Team Liquid	Super Smash Bros. Brawl, Super Smash Bros. for Wii U, Super Smash Bros. Ultimate	2009–present
Alpharad	Jacob Rabon IV	United States	Panda Global	Super Smash Bros. Ultimate	2018–present
Maister	Enrique Hernández Solís	Mexico	Spacestation Gaming	Super Smash Bros. Ultimate	2017–present
Reginald	Andy Dinh	United States	Team SoloMid	League of Legends	2009–2013
Forsen	Sebastian Fors	Sweden	Cloud9	Starcraft II, Hearthstone	
NYChrisG	Christopher Gonzalez	United States	TempoStorm	Fighting Games	
Momochi	Yusuke Momochi	Japan	Evil Geniuses	Street Fighter (series)	
Infiltration	Lee Seon-woo	South Korea		Street Fighter (series)	
xPeke	Enrique Cedeño Martinez	Spain	Origen	League of Legends	2010–present
Faker	Lee Sang-hyeok	South Korea	SK Telecom T1	League of Legends	2013–present
YellOwStaR	Bora Kim	France	PSG Esports (Coach)	League of Legends	2010–2016
kennyS	Kenny Schrub	France	G2 Esports	Counter-Strike: Source, Counter-Strike: Global Offensive	2012–present
NEO	Filip Kubski	Poland	Virtus.pro	Counter-Strike, Counter-Strike: Global Offensive	2004–present
Maikelele	Mikail Bill	Sweden	Digital Chaos	Counter-Strike, Counter-Strike: Global Offensive	2010–present
olofmeister	Olof Kajbjer	Sweden	FaZe Clan	Counter-Strike, Counter-Strike: Global Offensive	2012–present
Bjergsen	Søren Bjerg	Denmark	Team SoloMid	League of Legends	2012–present
Sneaky	Zachary Scuderi	United States	Cloud9	League of Legends	2012–present
Hai	Hai Lam	United States	Flyquest	League of Legends	2012–present
Doublelift	Peng Yiliang	United States	Team Liquid	League of Legends	2011–present
PerkZ	Luka Perković	Croatia	Cloud9	League of Legends	2014–present
Rekkles	Martin Larsson	Sweden	Fnatic	League of Legends	2012–present
FalleN	Gabriel Toledo	Brazil	Furia Esports, formerly MIBR, Luminostiy Gaming, and SK Gaming	Counter-Strike, Counter-Strike: Global Offensive	2004–present
Fear	Clinton Loomis	United States		Defense of the Ancients, Dota 2	2005–present
rapha	Shane Hendrixson	United States	Team Liquid	Quake	2008–present
AdmiralBulldog	Henrik Ahnberg	Sweden		Dota 2	2012–2016
s4	Gustav Magnusson	Sweden	Evil Geniuses	Dota 2	2012–present
Puppey	Clement Ivanov	Estonia	Team Secret	Dota 2	2007–present
Zhou	Chen Yao	China		Dota 2	2009–2014
Hao	Chen Zhihao	China		Dota 2	2009–2017
SanSheng	Wang Zhaohui	China		Dota 2	2008–2015
Banana	Wang Jiao	China	Newbee	Dota 2	2009–2016
Aui 2000	Kurtis Ling	Canada		Dota 2	2012–present
ppd	Peter Dager	United States	Ninjas in Pyjamas	Dota 2	2012–present
Sumail	Sumail Hassan	Pakistan	Evil Geniuses	Dota 2	2014–present
Miracle-	Amer al-Barqawi	Jordan	Team Liquid	Dota 2	2015–present
KuroKy	Kuro Salehi Takhasomi	Germany	Team Liquid	Dota 2	2007–present
SonicFox	Dominique McLean	United States	Echo Fox	Injustice 2, Mortal Kombat X, Dragon Ball Fighterz	2011–present
shroud	Michael Grzesiek	Canada	Cloud9 (retired)	Counter-Strike: Global Offensive	2013–2017
Kolento	Alexandr Malsh	Ukraine	Cloud9	Hearthstone	2014–present
Trump	Jeffrey Shih	United States	Cloud9	Hearthstone	2014–present
Hafu	Rumay Wang	United States	Cloud9	Hearthstone,World of Warcraft	?–present
Amaz	Jason Chan	China/Canada	NRG Esports	Hearthstone	2014–present
StanCifka	Stanislav Cifka	Czech Republic		Hearthstone, Magic: The Gathering	2015–present
Brian Kibler	Brian Kibler	United States		Hearthstone, Magic: The Gathering	1996–present
Kripparrian	Octavian Morosan	Canada	Team Solomid	Hearthstone, Magic: The Gathering, Diablo III	2012–present
Pavel	Pavel Beltiukov	Russia		Hearthstone	2016–present
Tfue	Turner Ellis Tenney	United States	Formerly FaZe Clan	Fortnite	2014–present
Clayster	James Clayton Eubanks	United States	Dallas Empire	Call of Duty	?–present
Attach	Dillon Price	United States	Evil Geniuses (loan)	Call of Duty	2013–present
antdavis3	Anthony Davis	United States	FaZe Clan Nuke Squad	Call of Duty	2022–present
GuardiaN	Ladislav Kovács	Slovakia	Natus Vincere, formerly Faze Clan	Counter-Strike: Global Offensive	2012–2022
NiKo	Nikola Kovač	Bosnia and Herzegovina	Team Falcons, formerly G2 Esports and Faze Clan	Counter-Strike: Global Offensive	2010–present
Karrigan	Finn Andersen	Denmark	Faze Clan, formerly Mousesports	Counter-Strike: Global Offensive	2008–present
Scump	Seth Abner	United States	Chicago Huntsmen	Call of Duty	2011–present
Karma	Damon Barlow	Canada/United States	Chicago Huntsmen	Call of Duty	2012–present
ACHES	Patrick Price	United States	Team EnVyUs	Call of Duty	2010–present
Happy	Vincent Cervoni Schopenhauer	France	Team LDLC	Counter-Strike: Global Offensive	2012–present
Karma	Ben Jackson	United States	Team Carbon	Halo	2005–present
Tsquared	Tom Taylor	United States	Str8 Rippin	Halo	2005–2015
Ace	Aaron Elam	United States	OpTic Gaming	Halo	2006–present
Saiyan	Ryan Danford	United States	The Raincallers	Halo	2004–2007
GH057ayame	Eric Hewitt	United States	Team Carbon	Halo	2005–2007
Zyos	Matt Leto	United States	Str8 Rippin	Halo	2003–2006
Lil Poison	Victor De Leon III	United States		Halo	2007–present
Ogre 1	Dan Ryan	United States	The Incredibles	Halo	2004–2009
Savage	Kenny Vaccaro	United States	Gamers First	Halo	2022–present
Benkert Szn	Kurt Benkert	United States	Spacestation Gaming	Halo	2022–present
Stork	Song Byung-gu	South Korea	Samsung Galaxy	StarCraft	2004–present
Fantasy	Jung Myung-hoon	South Korea	Dead Pixels	StarCraft	2007–present
Amazing	Maurice Stückenschneider	Germany	100 Thieves	League of Legends	2012–present
Impact	Jeong Eon-yeong	South Korea	Team Liquid	League of Legends	2012–present
Xmithie	Jake Kevin Puchero	South Korea	Team Liquid	League of Legends	2012–present
Jensen	Nicolaj Jensen	Denmark	Team Liquid	League of Legends	2012–present
iloveoov	Choi Yeon-sung	South Korea	Team Liquid	League of Legends	2003–present
Cypher	Alexey Yanushevsky	Belarus	Nemiga Gaming	Quake	2006–present
TaZ	Wiktor Wojtas	Poland	Virtus.pro	Counter-Strike: Global Offensive	2004–2023
Twistzz	Russel Van Dulken	Canada	Faze Clan, formerly Team Liquid	Counter-Strike: Global Offensive	2015–present
s1mple	Oleksandr Kostyliev	Ukraine	BC.Game, formerly Team Liquid and Natus Vincere	Counter-Strike: Global Offensive	2013–present
Stewie2K	Jake Yip	United States	Team Liquid	Counter-Strike: Global Offensive	2016–present
dupreeh	Peter Rasmussen	Denmark	Astralis	Counter-Strike: Global Offensive	2012–present
fox	Ricardo Pacheco	Portugal	Giants Gaming	Counter-Strike: Global Offensive	2007–present
FREAKAZOiD	Ryan Abadir	United States		Counter-Strike: Global Offensive	2012–present
missharvey	Stephanie Harvey	Canada	Counter Logic Gaming	Counter-Strike: Global Offensive	2005–present
Xyp9x	Andreas Højsleth	Denmark	Astralis	Counter-Strike: Global Offensive	2012–present
Rambo	Ronald Kim	United States	Complexity Gaming	Counter-Strike: Global Offensive	1997–present
KioShiMa	Fabien Fiey	France		Counter-Strike: Global Offensive	2012–present
Ksharp	Kyle Miller	United States		Counter-Strike: Global Offensive	2002–2007
n0thing	Jordan Gilbert	United States		Counter-Strike: Global Offensive	2008–present
dev1ce	Nicolai Reedtz	Denmark	Astralis	Counter-Strike: Global Offensive	2013–present
ropz	Robin Kool	Estonia	Team Vitality, formerly Faze Clan and Mousesports	Counter-Strike: Global Offensive	2017–present
ZywOo	Mathieu Herbaut	France	Team Vitality	Counter-Strike: Global Offensive	2018–present
Sgares	Sean Gares	United States		Counter-Strike: Global Offensive	2009–present
ShahZaM	Shahzeb Khan	United States	Complexity Gaming	Counter-Strike: Global Offensive	2014–present
shox	Richard Papillon	France	G2 Esports	Counter-Strike: Global Offensive	?–?
SmithZz	Edouard Dubourdeaux	France	G2 Esports	Counter-Strike: Global Offensive	2014–present
Summit1g	Jaryd Lazar	United States		Counter-Strike: Global Offensive	?–?
Tokido	Hajime Taniguchi	Japan		The King of Fighters, Street Fighter	2002–present
N0tail	Johan Sundstein	Denmark	OG	Heroes of Newerth, Dota 2	2012–present
Fly	Tal Aizik	Israel	Evil Geniuses	Heroes of Newerth, Dota 2	2012–present
Cyanide	Lauri Happonen	Finland	Origen	League of Legends	2009–2017
ana	Anathan Pham	Australia	OG	Dota 2	2015–present
BorasLegend	Ivan Lapanje	Sweden	Hashtag United F.C.	Fifa	2009–present
Dirty Mike	Michael LaBelle	United States		Fifa	2006–present
Wendelllira	Wendell Lira	Brazil	Netshoes E-Sports	Fifa	2012–present
Diego Demme	Diego Demme	Germany		Fifa	2019–present
M_ocki	Sascha Mockenhaupt	Germany	SV Wehen Wiesbaden	Fifa	2020–present
Julian Riedel	Julian Riedel	Germany	Hansa Rostock	Fifa	2020–present
Jay Ajayi	Jay Ajayi	United Kingdom		Fifa	2020–present
Brent Petway	Brent Petway	United States	Panathinaikos eSports	NBA 2K	2018–present
B0ston	Boston Scott	United States	Dignitas	Rocket League	2022–present
Fuudo	Keita Ai	Japan	Cygames Beast	Street Fighter V	2005–present
GamerBee	Bruce Yu-lin Hsiang	Taiwan	AVerMedia	Street Fighter	2010–present
Mystik	Kat Gunn	United States		Dead or Alive	2006–present
Luffy	Olivier Hay	France	Team ARES	Street Fighter	2010–present
Xain	Ho Kun Xian	Singapore	Team Razer	Street Fighter	2009–present
Kayane	Marie-Laure Norindr	France	Red Bull	Soulcalibur V	2001–2014
Kazunoko	Ryota Inoue	Japan	GODSGARDEN	Street Fighter, Guilty Gear	2013–present
nanonoko	Randy Lew	United States	Team Liquid	Hearthstone	2016–?
Latif	Abdullatif Alhmili	Saudi Arabia		Street Fighter, Guilty Gear	2009–present
NuckleDu	Du Dang	United States	Echo Fox	Street Fighter	2012–present
HelloKittyRicki	Ricki Ortiz	United States		Street Fighter	2003–present
Punk	Victor Woodley	United States	Panda Global	Street Fighter	2016–present
Snake Eyez	Darryl Lewis	United States	Red Bull	Street Fighter	2010–present
CaliPower	Alex Valle	United States	Red Bull	Street Fighter	1996–present
Vanessa	Vanessa Arteaga	United States	San Francisco Optx	Dead or Alive 4	2007–2008
Apollo	Shaun Clark	United States		StarCraft	?–?
Gordon Hayward	Gordon Hayward	United States	HUPU Esports	League of Legends, StarCraft II	2011–present
Darshan	Darshan Upadhyaya	United States	Counter Logic Gaming	League of Legends	2015–present
KiWiKiD	Alan Nguyen	United States		League of Legends	2011–present
Shiphtur	Danny Le	United States	Golden Guardians	League of Legends	2012–present
Stixxay	Trevor Hayes	United States	Counter Logic Gaming	League of Legends	2014–present
Biofrost	Vincent Wang	Canada	Counter Logic Gaming	League of Legends	?–present
iamchris4life	Chris Chike	United States		Dance Dance Revolution, Guitar Hero	2008–Present
FreddieWong10	Freddie Wong	United States		Guitar Hero	2007–?
ElkY	Bertrand Grospellier	France		StarCraft, WarCraft III	2001–2004
IdrA	Gregory Fields	United States	Evil Geniuses	StarCraft	2007–present
LucifroN	Pedro Moreno Durán	Spain	Team Liquid	StarCraft	2007–?
Adrian	Adrian Ma	United States	Echo Fox	League of Legends	2015–present
Aluka	Peng Zhenming	China	Team WE	League of Legends	2012–present
Balls	An Le	United States	FlyQuest	League of Legends	2012–present
Bdd	Gwak Bo-seong	South Korea	KT Rolster	League of Legends	2015–present
Bengi	Bae Seong-ung	South Korea	SK Telecom T1	League of Legends	2014–2018
BIG	Terry Chuong	United States	OpTic Gaming	League of Legends	2013–present
Cabochard	Lucas Simon-Meslet	France	Team Vitality	League of Legends	2013–present
Caps	Rasmus Winther	Denmark	G2 Esports	League of Legends	2016–present
Diamondprox	Danil Reshetnikov	Russia	Gambit Esports	League of Legends	2011–present
Dan Dinh	Dan Dinh	Russia	Cloud9	League of Legends	2010–2013
Doinb	Kim Tae-sang	South Korea	FunPlus Phoenix	League of Legends	2012–present
Dyrus	Marcus Hill	United States	Delta Fox	League of Legends	2010–2017
Expect	Ki Dae-han	South Korea	Excel Esports	League of Legends	2014–present
Febiven	Fabian Diepstraten	Netherlands	Clutch Gaming	League of Legends	2014–present
FeniX	Kim Jae-hun	South Korea	Echo Fox	League of Legends	2013–present
FORG1VEN	Konstantinos-Napoleon Tzortziou	Greece	Origen (esports)	League of Legends	2013–present
Freeze	Aleš Kněžínek	Czech Republic	Tempo Storm	League of Legends	2012–present
Froggen	Henrik Hansen	Denmark	Golden Guardians	League of Legends	2011–present
Bunny FuFuu	Michael Kurylo	United States	Cloud9	League of Legends	2013–2016
Gamsu	Noh Yeong-jin	South Korea	Shanghai Dragons	League of Legends, Overwatch	2014–present
GBM	Lee Chang-seok	South Korea	SuperMassive	League of Legends	2013–present
Gogoing	Gao Diping	China	Go Dream	League of Legends	?–?
Hard	Anthony Barkhovtsev	Canada	Echo Fox	League of Legends	2014–present
Hauntzer	Kevin Yarnell	United States	Golden Guardians	League of Legends	2013–present
HotshotGG	George Georgallidis	Canada	Counter Logic Gaming	League of Legends	2010–present
Huhi	Choi Jae-hyun	South Korea	Golden Guardians	League of Legends	2014–present
Huni	Heo Seung-hoon	South Korea	Clutch Gaming	League of Legends	2015–present
Alex Ich	Aleksei Ichetovkin	Russia	Team Envy	League of Legends	2010–present
Imaqtpie	Michael Santana	United States		League of Legends	2011–?
Karsa	Hung Hao-hsuan	Taiwan	Royal Never Give Up	League of Legends	2014–present
KEITH	Yuri Jew	United States	Echo Fox	League of Legends	2014–present
Kobe	Sam Hartman-Kenzler	United States	Counter Logic Gaming	League of Legends	2010–2011
LemonNation	Daerek Hart	United States	OpTic Gaming	League of Legends	2012–present
Lourlo	Samson Jackson	United States	Golden Guardians	League of Legends	2014–present
Lustboy	Ham Jang-sik	South Korea	Team SoloMid	League of Legends	2010–2015
Maple	Huang Yi-tang	Taiwan	Flash Wolves	League of Legends	2013–present
MaRin	Jang Gyeong-hwan	South Korea	Top Esports	League of Legends	2013–present
Matt	Matt Elento	United States	Team Liquid	League of Legends	2015–present
Meteos	William Hartman	United States	OpTic Gaming	League of Legends	2012–present
Misaya	Yu Jingxi	China	Team WE	League of Legends	2010–2013
Mithy	Alfonso Rodriguez	Spain	Origen	League of Legends	2012–present
Ohq	Oh Gyu-min	South Korea		League of Legends	2013–present
Piglet	Chae Gwang-jin	South Korea	Team Liquid	League of Legends	2013–present
Quas	Diego Ruiz	Venezuela	Tempo Storm	League of Legends	2013–present
Reignover	Kim Yeu-jin	South Korean	Cloud9	League of Legends	2013–present
Rush	Lee Yoon-jae	South Korean	Echo Fox	League of Legends	2014–present
Santorin	Lucas Tao Kilmer Larsen	Denmark	FlyQuest	League of Legends	2014–present
Sencux	Chres Laursen	Denmark	Rogue	League of Legends	2014–present
Seraph	Shin Woo-yeong	South Korea	Team Envy	League of Legends	2013–present
Smeb	Song Kyung-ho	South Korea	KT Rolster	League of Legends	2013–present
Smoothie	Andy Ta	Canada	Team SoloMid	League of Legends	2015–present
sOAZ	Paul Boyer	France	Misfits Gaming	League of Legends	2010–present
Toyz	Kurtis Lau Wai-kin	China (Hong Kong)	G-Rex	League of Legends	2011–present
Trick	Kim Gang-yun	South Korea	G2 Esports	League of Legends	2014–present
tyler1	Tyler Steinkamp	United States		League of Legends	2014–present
Uzi	Jian Zihao	China	Royal Never Give Up	League of Legends	2012–present
We1less	Wei Zhen	China	LGD Gaming	League of Legends	2012–present
WildTurtle	Jason Tran	Canada	FlyQuest	League of Legends	2012–present
XiaoWeiXiao	Yu Xian	China	VS Gaming	League of Legends	2012–present
Xpecial	Alex Chu	United States	Phoenix 1	League of Legends	2010–present
Zven	Jesper Svenningsen	Denmark	Team SoloMid	League of Legends	2013–present
Geguri	Kim Se-yeon	South Korea	Shanghai Dragons	Overwatch	2016–present
Dafran	Daniel Francesca	Denmark	Atlanta Reign	Overwatch	2016–2018
Jake	Jacob Lyon	United States	Houston Outlaws	Overwatch	2016–present
ryujehong	Ryu Je-hong	South Korea	Seoul Dynasty	Overwatch	2011–present
Thresh	Dennis Fong	United States		Quake	1993–1997
	Kim Ga-yeon	South Korea	SlayerS	StarCraft II	
Sjokz	Eefje Depoortere	Belgium		Unreal Tournament '99	
Sujoy	Sujoy Roy	United Kingdom		Quake	?–?
Cesaro	Cesaro	Switzerland	Tribe Gaming	UNO	2020–present
Bugha	Kyle Giersdorf	United States	Formerly Sentinels	Fortnite	2018–present
NubbinsGoody	Jonas Neubauer	United States		NES Tetris	2010–2020
Arslan Ash	Arslan Siddique	Pakistan	Twisted Minds, Red Bull eSports	Tekken; King of Fighters	2019–present
Atif Butt	Atif Ijaz	Pakistan	Team Falcons	Tekken	2019–present
QueenArrow	Sylvia Gathoni Wahome	Kenya		Mortal Kombat XL and Tekken 7	2017–present
Cazcom	Zooey Zephyr	United States		Super Smash Bros. and Project M	c. 2014
Ulsan	Lim Soo-hoon	South Korea	Freecs	Tekken	2018–present

== See also ==
- List of esports leagues and tournaments
