= Hamako Mori =

Japanese YouTuber and esports player (born 1930)

Gamer Grandma
- Born: Hamako Mori; 18 February 1930 (age 96); Asakusa, Japan
- Occupations: YouTuber, esports player

YouTube information
- Channel: Gamer Grandma
- Years active: 2014–2023
- Genre: video games
- Subscribers: 546 thousand
- Views: 30.2 million

Japanese name
- Kanji: 森 浜子
- Hiragana: もり はまこ
Transcriptions
- Romanization: Mori Hamako
- Last updated: 13 February 2025

Hamako Mori (born 18 February 1930), better known by her online alias Gamer Grandma, is a Japanese video game YouTuber and esports player. She is known to have been playing video and esports games since 1981. In May 2020, she was declared as the oldest ever gaming YouTuber in the world at the age of 90. She was praised and became an internet sensation for her gaming skills despite her age factor.

== Career ==
Mori pursued her interest in gaming in 1981 at the age of 51 after learning that her children and grandchildren were playing video games for hours. She started playing on the Cassette Vision console which was officially released in Japan on 30 July 1981. She then moved on to playing the Nintendo Famicom. Mori then ventured into PlayStation in the 1990's.

Mori initially played video games alone and then launched a gaming YouTube channel under the name Gamer Grandma in 2014 in order to connect with other gamers from across various parts of the world. She launched the YouTube channel in native Japanese language and apparently posted at least four videos of her games per month often gaining popularity with over million pageviews from viewers. She also started live streaming games such as Call of Duty: Modern Warfare and GTA 5 through her official YouTube account. She revealed that she often spend at least three or more hours per day on average playing her favourite games such as The Elder Scrolls V: Skyrim, Super Mario Bros., Dragon Quest, Final Fantasy, Call of Duty and Grand Theft Auto V.

As of May 2020, Mori was reported to have had over 250,000 subscribers on YouTube and as of June 2020, she had approximately 300,000 subscribers. As of 13 May 2020, she was internationally recognized and was awarded the Guinness World Record for becoming the oldest gaming YouTuber in the world at the age of 90. As of June 2021, she reached 500,000 subscribers on the mentioned platform. She suspended activities since 14 May 2023, due to hospitalization for bone fracture, until 25 March 2026, when she uploaded a video to provide updates about her health.

== See also ==
- List of esports players
- List of YouTubers
