= JJU =

JJU may refer to:

- Qaqortoq Heliport, in Greenland
- Jju language, spoken in Nigeria
- JJu (born 1983), gamer name of Byun Eun-jong, a South Korean professional StarCraft player
