= Little Poison =

Little Poison may refer to:

- Bruce Mather (ice hockey) (1926–1975), an American ice hockey player
- Jesús Pimentel (born 1940), a Mexican bantamweight boxer
- Rigoberto Riasco (1953–2022), a Panamanian professional boxer
- Paul Runyan (1908–2002), American professional golfer
- Lloyd Waner (1906–1982), Major League Baseball center fielder with the Pittsburgh Pirates
- Lil Poison, born Victor De Leon III (1998), the youngest professional gamer
