= Wei Zhen =

Wei Zhen is the name of:

- We1less (born 1997), real name Wei Zhen, Chinese League of Legends professional player
- Wei Zhen (footballer) (born 1997), Chinese association footballer
