= Imaqtpie =

American professional esports player

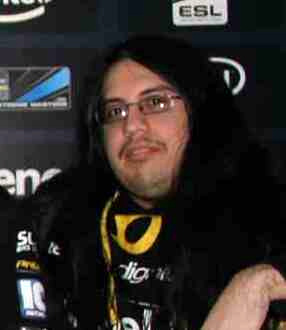
- Santana in 2012
- Born: Michael Santana
- Other names: qtpie; qt
- Occupations: Twitch streamer; Professional gamer; YouTuber
- Organizations: Team Dignitas; Delta Fox

Twitch information
- Channel: imaqtpie
- Years active: 2011–present
- Genre: Gaming
- Game: League of Legends
- Followers: 2.6 million
- Last updated: May 2, 2023

Michael Santana, better known as Imaqtpie (/ˌaɪməˈkjuːtipaɪ/ "I'm a cutie pie"), is an American League of Legends player. Formerly a professional player for Team Dignitas, he retired from professional play in 2014 to pursue a full-time streaming career on Twitch. He is one of League of Legends' largest online personalities with over 2.6 million followers on Twitch. In 2017 in an interview with Rolling Stone it was revealed he earns $2 million annually from streaming.

== Career ==
=== 2011 ===
In a Reddit AMA, Santana said the origin of his name came from his mom calling him "cute". At a young age, he played a lot of video games, particularly SOCOM U.S. Navy SEALs. He first began playing League of Legends shortly after the game's creation because it was free to play. After a few months, he began competing in local tournaments, where he was noticed by other players such as William "scarra" Li, who recruited him in April 2011 as an AD Carry on the team Rock Solid. In September of that year, Team Dignitas acquired the team to venture into professional League of Legends, and with it acquired Santana, scarra, and Joedat "Voyboy" Esfahani. According to Santana, his parents were proud of his career. "Having them support me and want me to do my best was very helpful for me to really focus on improving and doing what I had to do to be the best." A month later, the team won 1st place at IGN ProLeague (IPL) Season 3 in Atlantic City, defeating Epik Gamer 2–1 in the finals and earning a $10,000 prize for the team.

=== 2012 ===
In 2012, the team won 1st place at the LoLPro.com Curse Invitational in San Francisco and earned a $20,000 prize for the team. Later that year the team placed 2nd at the MLG Summer Championship in Raleigh, North Carolina losing to Team Curse in the finals, but both teams were disqualified and not awarded a prize after an investigation by MLG found the teams guilty of collusion. In September, Team Dignitas placed 2nd in the Season 2 North American Regional Finals in Seattle, Washington at PAX Prime, losing to Team SoloMid in the finals but qualifying the team to compete in the Season 2 World Championship in Los Angeles. The team placed last during the group stage without a single win, but their participation at Worlds qualified the team to compete in the Season 3 Spring Split. TSM top laner Dyrus later publicly apologized for accidentally revealing Team Dignitas's secret strategy to their opponents prior to the group stage, and admitted that the strategy might have given the team the upper hand in the tournament. "[Leaking the strategy] put Team Dignitas on tilt and lowered their morale... For those who say they would have lost anyway, that's not true because [TSM] lost to [the strategy] four times..."

=== 2013 ===
In 2013, the team started off strong, going 16–5 during the Spring regular season in the first 21 games, before going 1–6 in its final 7 games, ending the Spring regular season 17–11 but qualifying to compete in the Spring playoffs. In the Spring playoffs, the team placed last. In the 2013 Summer regular season, the team finished 5th with a score of 13–15 and qualified to compete in the Summer playoffs, but finished 4th, failing to qualify to compete in Worlds but allowing the team to compete next spring. When asked about avoiding relegation, Santana said "I don't even know how that was possible. Against [Team Curse], I honestly thought we were going to get relegated that season, and we somehow beat them... it's sometimes like 'Man... is North America this bad?' We don't do anything special but we can somehow manage to make it to 3rd or 4th place in most things." When asked if players needed to be replaced due to underperforming, teammate William "scarra" Li said Santana was underrated by others in the scene due to his lack of publicity on social media in the past, saying he considered Santana and his partner Jordan "Patoy" Blackburn to be "the best bot lane in North America... they're just insanely good." Li also praised Santana's knowledge of the game, saying "He conceptualizes the game really really well, so he's like an AD Carry shot caller, which is very very unusual... He is one of the players [on the team] that would be very incredibly hard to replace."

=== 2014 ===
In spring of 2014, Dignitas placed 4th during the regular season and did not qualify to compete in the playoffs. In the summer split, they placed 6th with a 13–15 record. In an interview, Santana said the team's lack of success was due to the players' desire to have fun, rather than to compete. "We've always had problems with the team that have stopped us from being as good as we could be. I honestly feel like, with the people we have, we could be the best, it's just that our mentality is terrible so it just stops us from doing anything... We don't have drive."

In October 2014, Team Dignitas announced that William "scarra" Li would be leaving the team, and three weeks later the team announced that Santana would be following suit, the last two members of the original lineup. In a vlog uploaded to his YouTube channel, Santana explained his retirement from professional League of Legends, saying he enjoyed playing with friends more than competing professionally:

In the start of my career, League was awesome... but I never had it in me to cut players for under-performing and things like that, so as the scene became more and more competitive, I wasn't meshing well with the scene and where it was going... I wish it was the way it was before, where it was just like playing with friends, just enjoying the game and having fun... Because of that, I've decided that it's better off for me if I just don't re-sign [with Team Dignitas] and try to figure out what it is I'm looking to do... at the end of the day, all I wanted from League of Legends was a place to hang out and play games with people...

— Santana, "my first vlog.... mercy..." on YouTube

=== 2015–present ===
After leaving Dignitas, Santana became one of the largest League of Legends streamers, with over 2.3 million followers on Twitch as of September 2018. His YouTube channel has over 1.6 million subscribers and 660 million views as of November 2020. According to an interview with Rolling Stone in 2017 Santana earns over $2 million a year as a Twitch streamer, not including corporate sponsorships.

In 2016, Santana was awarded The Esports Industry Awards Domino's Streamer of the Year award. In 2017, Santana was a nominee for the Teen Choice Awards Choice Gamer award.

In the summer of 2017, Santana briefly returned to competitive play, this time in the North American Challenger Series when Echo Fox announced a new sister team called Delta Fox. Santana joined its roster with former Team Dignitas teammates William "scarra" Li, Joedat "Voyboy" Esfahani, Danny "Shiphtur" Le, and retired Team SoloMid player Marcus "Dyrus" Hill. An unconventional decision to create a team with a roster exclusively of retired players, fans began referring to the team as the "Meme Team," prompting then-CEO Jace Hall to say "This is not a joke." The team defeated Toronto eSports 2–0 in the 2017 Spring Qualifier before ending the Spring season 1–1–3. The team disbanded at the end of the summer split following a 0–10 record. When asked about the team's results, Echo Fox owner Rick Fox said "...while the record may not show it, I have to think that it has reignited their competitive fire."

After his run with Delta Fox, Santana continued streaming, primarily League of Legends.

== Personal life ==
In July 2018 he had a surprise wedding with his girlfriend Lisha Wei, which gained media attention due to his attire: a T-shirt and shorts. He currently lives in California. Santana confirmed on his stream in early 2020 that he and Lisha were no longer together.

== Notable tournament results ==
Career tournament results
Date	Event	Placing	Team	Record	Opponent
October 6–9, 2011	IGN ProLeague (IPL) Season 3	(gold) 1st	Team Dignitas	2–1	Epik Gamer
February 11–25, 2012	LoLPro.com Curse Invitational	(gold) 1st	Team Dignitas	2–0	Team Curse
August 24–26, 2012	MLG Summer Championship	2nd	Team Dignitas	2–3	Team Curse
August 30 – September 2, 2012	LCS Season 2 North American Regional Finals	2nd	Team Dignitas	0–2	Team SoloMid
October 4–13, 2012	LCS Season 2 World Championship	12th	Team Dignitas	0–3	
February 7–19, 2013	LCS Season 3 North American Spring Regular Season	(bronze) 3rd	Team Dignitas	17–11	
April 26–28, 2013	LCS Season 3 North American Spring Playoffs	6th	Team Dignitas	1–2	Good Game University
June 12–16, 2013	LCS Season 3 North American Summer Regular Season	5th	Team Dignitas	13–15	
October 30 – September 1, 2013	LCS Season 3 North American Summer Playoffs	4th	Team Dignitas	0–2	Cloud9
January 16 – April 6, 2014	LCS 2014 North American Spring Regular Season	4th	Team Dignitas	12–16	
May 23 – August 3, 2014	LCS 2014 North American Summer Regular Season	6th	Team Dignitas	13–15	
	North American Challenger Series(NACS) 2017 Spring Qualifiers	(gold) 1st	Delta Fox	2–0	Toronto eSports
January 25 – March 1, 2017	North American Challenger Series(NACS) 2017 Spring Regular Season	5th	Delta Fox	1–1–3	
	North American Challenger Series(NACS) 2017 Summer Qualifiers	5th	Delta Fox	3–1	Team Liquid Academy
	North American Challenger Series(NACS) 2017 Summer Regular Season	6th	Delta Fox	0–10	

== See also ==
- List of most-followed Twitch channels
