= Scarra =

American professional esports players

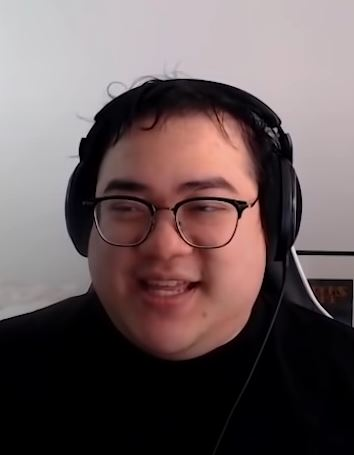
- Li in 2020

Personal information
- Name: William Jimmy Li
- Born: November 25, 1989 (age 36)
- Nationality: American

Career information
- Game: League of Legends
- Playing career: 2011–2014
- Role: Mid-laner
- Coaching career: 2014–2015

Team history

As player:
- 2011–2014: Team Dignitas

As coach:
- 2014: Team Dignitas
- 2015: Counter Logic Gaming

Career highlights and awards
- LCS All-Star (2013)

Twitch information
- Channel: Scarra
- Years active: 2012–2014; 2017-present
- Genre: Gaming
- Followers: 1.6 million

YouTube information
- Channel: Scarra
- Genre: Gaming
- Subscribers: 760 thousand
- Views: 231 million
- Last updated: April 3, 2025

William Li (born November 25, 1989), also known as his pseudonym Scarra, is an American Twitch streamer and former professional League of Legends player. He is most well known for being the mid laner for Team Dignitas. Li is a co-founder of OfflineTV, an online social entertainment group of content creators.

== Early life ==
Li's older brother is named David. He got all A's in middle school. He had a stuttering problem growing up, so his parents forced him to join a debate club in high school. He attended Texas A&M University but dropped out in 2012 to pursue a professional gaming career.

== Career ==
=== League of Legends ===
==== Season 1 ====
Li started playing League of Legends after its official release. He started to get attention from Locust, which he knew from World of Warcraft. He, Rambo, Th3Rat, Naryt, Voyboy, and Araragi together created a team to compete in the 2010 Newegg Winter Winfest tournament but lost the tournament.

Li signed with Team Dignitas prior to the start of the inaugural League of Legends Championship Series season.

On October 9, 2011, Li and his team defeated Epik Gamer 2-1 in the IGN Proleague Season 3 - Atlantic City.

Li was able to place third in the IEM Season VI - Global Challenge Kyiv but was defeated in the semifinals.

At the LoLPro.com Curse Invitational in San Francisco, Scarra and Team Dignitas took home the grand prize of $20,000.

Li attended the IEM Season VI - World Championship in Hanover.

==== Season 2 ====
While on the way back to the United States, Li attended IGN Proleague Season 4 - Las Vegas on April 6, 2012. His team was able to defeat Monomaniac 2-1 and Counter Logic Gaming Prime 2-1 in the second round. Team Dignitas fell short 2–1 against Team SoloMid and were ultimately eliminated by Counter Logic Gaming Prime 2–0.

On June 6, 2012, Li attended the MLG Pro Circuit - Spring Championship with a newly reformed Dignitas, having Voyboy replaced by Crumbzz. Scarra and Team Dignitas defeated Team Green Forest, Team Dynamic, and Counter Logic Gaming Prime. They lost to Team SoloMid, which they encountered Counter Logic Gaming Prime and lost 2–0, taking home third place.

Li and Team Dignitas participated in the 2012 MLG Summer Championship. They originally finished in second place in the tournament but would later be disqualified after MLG determined that there was collusion between Dignitas and the first-place team, Curse NA. At the Season Two North American Regionals, they also finished second, losing to Team SoloMid in the finals.

==== Season 3 ====
Li and his team attended the Season 3 League Championship Series. They finished in third place.

The Season 3 LCS Spring Playoffs took place in April, and Li and his team were sent to relegation at the Season 3 LCS Summer Promotion. Team Dignitas was able to defeat Team Summon 3-1 and secure their spot in the summer season.

His team also competed in the 2013 MLG Winter Championship. They went against Gambit Gaming but lost 2–0.

Scarra being interviewed at IPL5 Las Vegas in November 2013

In April 2013, Li was publicly voted as the NA LCS mid-lane All-Star, which allowed him to play for the North America LCS team and compete in All-Star Shanghai 2013. They lost against China LPL, 2–0. They went on to win against the Europe LCS by 2–0. After winning against Europe LCS, they went on to play against the Korean OGN Champions and lost 2–0.

==== Season 4 ====
On December 10, CLG was fined $10,000 by Riot for poaching Li from Dignitas. Additionally, Scarra would be banned from serving the position of being CLG's head coach for the first three weeks of the spring LCS. Scarra played for CLG Black in the summer season qualifier, but after defeating Maelstrom, they were forced to substituted out AD carry Stixxay for Frost and then lost to both Cloud9 Tempest and Magnetic, missing out on the NACS summer season.

=== Return to Twitch & OfflineTV ===
Following his retirement from the League of Legends Championship series, Li made his return to Twitch as a full-time content creator. In June 2017, Li joined Echo Fox's League of Legends Challenger Series team, Delta Fox, as a midlaner. He would leave two months later, joining the Meme Stream Dream Team, a team formed by Delta Fox's former roster. The Dream Team played in three exhibition tournaments: The Tyler1 Championship Series in 2017 and 2018, along with a "showmatch" at the 2018 NA LCS finals.

In July 2017, he and his then-manager, Chris Chan, founded OfflineTV, an online social entertainment group based in Los Angeles, California. Speaking on the origins of the group, Li stated "I think I just wanted to live with friends. That was the origin of it. I wanted to live with people and make cool stuff with other people. It was myself and my manager Chris who started this idea. It just led to where it is today. I can’t say that there was a formula we followed. We faced a lot of problems along the way. However, thanks to these problems, I feel like we came out stronger.

In 2019, Li was one of the most watched Teamfight Tactics streamers following the game's release in June, averaging 7,000 viewers. He also completed a streaming challenge where he streamed every day for the entire year.

In 2021, Li debuted a dragon VTuber model based on Choncc from Teamfight Tactics. His character experienced an isekai woken up in a fantasy world.

In 2022, Li debuted his new VTuber model, an evolved evil version of his original model. His character underwent a transformation after tragic incidents in the fantasy world.

In 2024, he disclosed in the OFFLINETV 30 DAY FITNESS CHALLENGE video that he is officially diagnosed with Type 2 Diabetes.

== Select competitions ==
=== League of Legends ===
Date	Location	Event	Placement	Winnings (US$)
2013-12-22	Cologne, Germany	Battle of the Atlantic 2013 - Winning Region	Win	$1,000
2012-09-02	Seattle, United States	Season 2 North American Regional Finals	2nd	$6,000
2012-02-25	Online	Solomid NA Tournament Circuit - Invitational #5	1st	$240
2012-02-25	San Francisco, United States	LoLPro.com Curse Invitational	1st	$5,000
2012-01-22	Kyiv, Ukraine	Intel® Extreme Masters Season VI - Global Challenge: Kyiv	3rd	$680
2011-11-20	Providence, United States	2011 Major League Gaming Pro Circuit Providence	3rd	$1,000
2011-10-09	Atlantic City, United States	IGN Pro League Season 3: Origins	1st	$2,000

=== Awards and nominations ===
Award	Year	Category	Result	Ref.
The Streamer Awards	2021	Legacy Award	Nominated	
The Streamer Awards	2021	Best Strategy Game Streamer	Nominated	
The Streamer Awards	2022	Best Strategy Game Streamer	Nominated	

== See also ==
- Imaqtpie
- Disguised Toast
- Pokimane
