= Allu (gamer) =

Finnish esports player (born 1992)

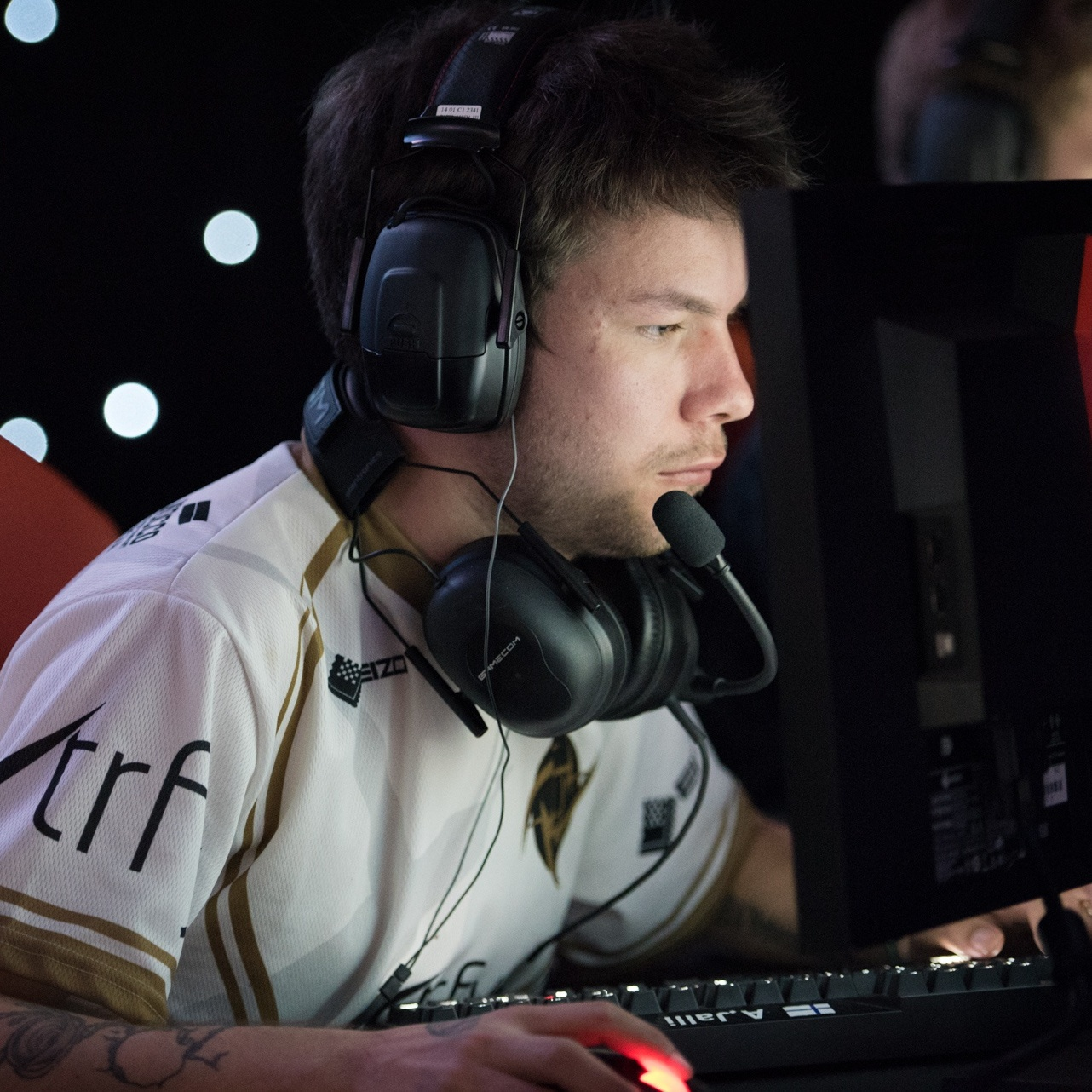
- Jalli with Ninjas in Pyjamas at Dreamhack Summer 2015

Personal information
- Name: Aleksi Jalli
- Born: May 20, 1992 (age 34)
- Nationality: Finnish

Current team
- Team: ENCE
- Role: Coach
- Game: Counter-Strike 2

Career information
- Playing career: 2009–2025
- Coaching career: 2026–present

Team history
- 2013–2014: ENCE
- 2014–2015: mousesports
- 2015: 3DMAX
- 2015: Ninjas in Pyjamas
- 2016: ENCE eSports
- 2016–2017: FaZe Clan
- 2017–2018: OpTic Gaming
- 2018–2022: ENCE
- 2022: temp
- 2022–2025: JANO
- 2026–Present: ENCE

Career highlights and awards
- HLTV Top 20 Player of the Year (2015)

Aleksi Jalli (born May 20, 1992), better known as allu, is a Finnish professional Counter-Strike 2 coach for ENCE. He previously played for Ninjas in Pyjamas and FaZe Clan. He has also played for 3DMAX, mousesports (mouz), ENCE, Rats of the Year, Team Curse, RAIDERS, The Hawks, and Team WinFakt.

== Career ==
=== Counter-Strike 1.6 Career ===
Jalli started playing CS competitively in Finland's 1.6 scene. He attended some notable events such as DreamHack Winter 2009, DreamHack Winter 2010, and Copenhagen Games 2011, but he never had any notable results.

=== 2012/2013 ===
Jalli transitioned to Counter-Strike: Global Offensive successfully, and played for some low level Finnish teams. He eventually transitioned to ENCE, but at the time, the Finnish scene didn't have very much talent, and allu once again struggled to place.

=== 2014 ===
Jalli left ENCE in June, and later the organization dropped the rest of the CS:GO roster. Jalli joined mousesports in July 2014. At ESWC 2014 mouz finished 9 - 12th. mouz failed to qualify for the third CS:GO Major of 2014, DreamHack Winter 2014. mouz found very minor success at smaller LANs in 2014.

=== 2015 ===
Jalli left mousesports at the end of January and joined 3DMax. During his brief stint with the team he failed to qualify for CS:GO Major ESL One Katowice 2015. Jalli joined Stockholm-based Ninjas in Pyjamas in February, replacing Mikail "Maikelele" Bill on what was intended to be trial basis. At 2015's first CS:GO Major, ESL One Katowice 2015, they finished second after losing to Fnatic in the finals. In August the second CS:GO Major, ESL One Cologne 2015, was held, and Jalli and NiP finished in 5-8th. In November NiP finished 3-4th in the third Major of the year, DreamHack Open Cluj-Napoca 2015. In December NiP finished second at Fragbite Masters Season 5. Jalli left Ninjas in Pyjamas on December 8, two months before his contract was set to expire, and did not immediately join another team. After a successful individual year for Jalli, he claimed 19th place in the Top 20 Players of 2015 by hltv.org.

=== 2016 ===
On January 4 it was announced that Jalli had rejoined ENCE eSports. Once again, Jalli would not find much success with the Finnish team, and on August 16, Jalli transferred to FaZe, replacing fox on the roster. After adding karrigan, FaZe had some notable placements including a semifinals finish at IEM Oakland 2016 and ELEAGUE Season 2.

=== 2017 ===
FaZe had good results in the start of 2017 with Jalli, placing 2nd at IEM Sydney 2017 and IEM Katowice 2017. They placed 1st at StarLadder & i-League Season 3. However, at PGL Major Kraków 2017, FaZe went out in last place. In the aftermath, Jalli was benched from FaZe, and replaced by GuardiaN. Jalli was soon moved to the short lived international European roster of OpTic Gaming.

=== 2018 ===
In 2018, Jalli once again returned to the Finnish scene and formed the Finnish team ENCE along with Aleksi "Aleksib" Virolainen, Jani "Aerial" Jussila, Sami "xseven" Laasanen, and Jere "sergej" Salo. The roster would soon find success, winning StarSeries and I-League Season 6, over Vega Squadron. At the end of 2018, Jalli and ENCE would win Dreamhack Winter 2018, with a great personal performance from Jalli.

=== 2019 ===
In early 2019, ENCE had a major upset and came 2nd at the first major of the year, IEM Katowice 2019. Later on in the year, they would attend StarSeries i-League Season 7, where they would place 5th-8th, falling at the hands of Natus Vincere. Following this, they would make a 3rd-place finish at Blast Pro Series São Paulo, going 4-1-1 in the group stage where they drew against Team Liquid and lost to Astralis. They would get revenge on the latter, however, by defeating them in a best-of-3 final at Blast Pro Series Madrid 2–0, taking their first LAN title of the year. ENCE placed 2nd at DreamHack Master Dallas 2019 and IEM Chicago 2019, losing to Team Liquid in the grand finals both times. Before the StarLadder Major: Berlin 2019, ENCE were set to replace their In-Game Leader Aleksi "Aleksib" Virolainen with Miikka "suNny" Kemppi, after the major. Allu took over In-Game Leading duties after his departure.

=== 2021–2022 ===
In May 2021, Jalli announced he would be stepping down from the active ENCE roster for "personal reasons", and officially left the team one month later. He played a couple matches as a stand-in with Complexity in October 2021.

After a period of inactivity, Jalli returned to the game in February 2022, forming a new Finnish CS:GO team with former ENCE head coach Slaava "Twista" Räsänen.

=== 2024 ===
In late 2024 Allu participated as an ambassador in the Wildz Invitational run by Rootz Ltd.

== Personal life ==
During his time on Ninjas In Pyjamas, Jalli mostly lived in Finland, but met with his teammates in person before major tournaments. Jalli has one child, who was born on 16 February 2019, during ENCE's historic run at IEM Katowice 2019.

== Tournament results ==
Bold denotes a CS:GO Major

| Placement | Tournament | Location | Date |
With Ninjas in Pyjamas
| 2nd place, silver medalist(s) | **ESL One Katowice 2015** | Katowice, Poland | 2015-03-12 – 2015-03-15 |
| 2nd place, silver medalist(s) | Gfniity Spring Masters 1 | London, United Kingdom | 2015-03-20 – 2015-03-22 |
| 2nd place, silver medalist(s) | StarLadder StarSeries XII | Kyiv, Ukraine | 2015-01-13 – 2015-03-29 |
| 2nd place, silver medalist(s) | FACEIT League 2015 Stage I Finals | London, United Kingdom | 2015-05-01 – 2015-05-03 |
| 2nd place, silver medalist(s) | Gfinity Masters Summer 1 | London, United Kingdom | 2015-06-26 – 2015-06-28 |
| 3rd place, bronze medalist(s) | **DreamHack Open Cluj-Napoca 2015** | Cluj-Napoca, Romania | 2015-10-28 – 2015-11-01 |
With 2016's ENCE Esports
| 1st place, gold medalist(s) | Operation: Kinguin #2 | N/A | 2016-01-18 – 2016-04-20 |
With FaZe Clan
| 2nd place, silver medalist(s) | IEM Katowice 2017 | Katowice, Poland | 2017-03-01 – 2017-03-05 |
| 1st place, gold medalist(s) | StarLadder i-League StarSeries Season 3 | Kyiv, Ukraine | 2017-04-04 – 2017-04-09 |
| 2nd place, silver medalist(s) | IEM Sydney 2017 | Sydney, Australia | 2017-05-03 – 2017-05-07 |
| 2nd place, silver medalist(s) | ECS Season 3 Finals | London, United Kingdom | 2017-06-23 – 2017-06-25 |
With 2018's ENCE Esports
| 1st place, gold medalist(s) | StarSeries & i-League CS:GO Season 6 | Kyiv, Ukraine | 2018-10-07 – 2018-10-14 |
| 1st place, gold medalist(s) | Dreamhack Open Winter 2018 | Jönköping, Sweden | 2018-11-30 – 2018-12-02 |
| 2nd place, silver medalist(s) | IEM Katowice 2019 | Katowice, Poland | 2019-02-13 – 2019-03-03 |
| 1st place, gold medalist(s) | BLAST Pro Series: Madrid 2019 | Madrid, Spain | 2019-05-10 – 2019-05-11 |
| 2nd place, silver medalist(s) | DreamHack Masters Dallas 2019 | Dallas, United States | 2019-05-28 – 2019-06-02 |
| 2nd place, silver medalist(s) | IEM Chicago 2019 | Chicago, United States | 2019-07-18 – 2019-07-21 |
