= Freedom (gamer) =

South Korean esports player (born 1988)

FreedoM

Personal information
- Name: Chang Yong-suk
- Born: April 26, 1988 (age 38)
- Nationality: South Korean

Career information
- Games: StarCraft; WarCraft III

- Freedom
- Hangul: 장용석
- RR: Jang Yongseok
- MR: Chang Yongsŏk

Chang Youngsuk (born April 26, 1988), known by his pseudonym Freedom, stylized FreedoM or FreeDoM, is a South Korean professional esports player of the real-time strategy games StarCraft and WarCraft III. Chang entered the E-sports world in 2004, beginning his career playing as the Night Elf race in the game WarCraft III.

Chang represented South Korea in WarCraft III at the World Cyber Games 2004, winning the 2004 national Korean qualifier. In 2005, he once again placed first on the World E-sports Festival. After the "MBC Map Scandal" where maps were rigged in order to make the Orc race more powerful, Freedom decided to quit playing WarCraft III and move onto playing StarCraft in 2006. Since then, his team Samsung Khan, won the championship for the StarCraft Pro-League 2006–2007 season.

Currently he is one of the most successful Korean poker players. He finished in 4th place at the 2008 Asian Poker Tour (APT) Manila where he took over $38,000 in prize money.

== Tournament placings ==
- 2003 MBC Sonokong Prime League III - 3rd place
- 2004 World Cyber Games Korea national qualifier - 1st Place
- 2005 MBC Land Cinema Prime League V - 3rd place
- 2005 World E-Sports Festival - 1st Place
- 2005 Ongamenet Invitational - 1st place
- 2007 Shinhan ProLeague - 1st place

=== Poker ===
- 2008 APPT Manila 2008 4th Place ($38,000)
