= Cabochard =

French professional League of Legends player

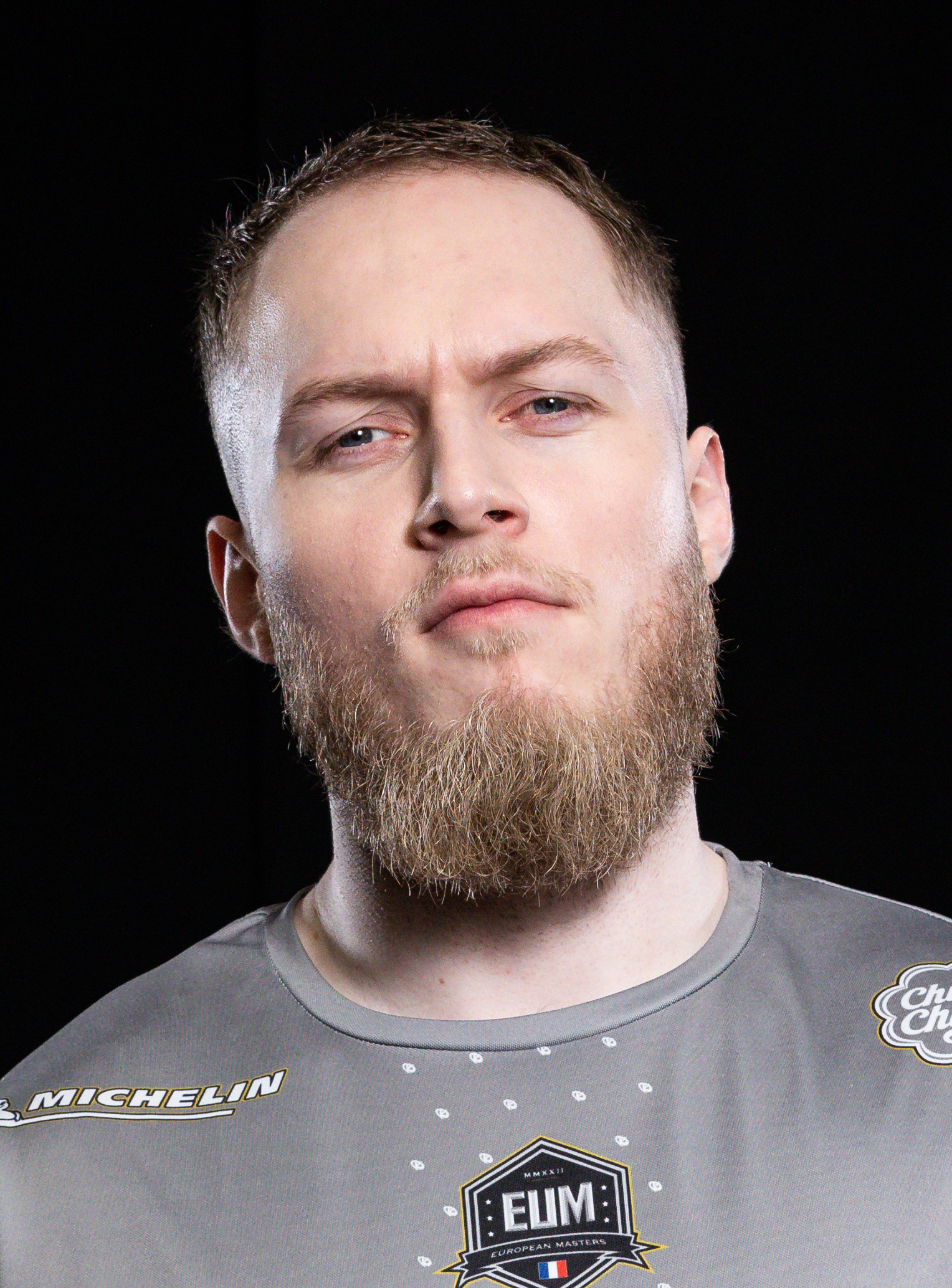

Personal information
- Name: Lucas Simon-Meslet
- Nationality: French

Career information
- Playing career: 2013–present
- Role: Top laner

Team history
- 2013: Escape the Ninja Pandas
- 2013–2014: Heavy Botlane
- 2014: COREPLAY
- 2014: GSI Gaming
- 2014: Heavy Botlane
- 2014: Ninjas in Pyjamas
- 2014–2015: Gambit Gaming
- 2016–2020: Team Vitality
- 2021–2024: Karmine Corp

Lucas Simon-Meslet, better known as Cabochard, is a French professional League of Legends player. He previously played for several other teams, most notably Gambit Gaming, Ninjas in Pyjamas, Team Vitality and Karmine Corp.

== Career ==
=== Season 3 ===
Cabochard's first notable tournament was at Paris Games Week 2013, where he competed with Escape the Ninja Pandas. The team ended up finishing in third place at the tournament. Soon after this, Cabochard joined Heavy Botlane.

=== 2014 season ===
After a short spell on Heavy Botlane, Cabochard joined COREPLAY towards the start of the season. During his time on the roster, the team managed to make it to the semifinals at the International Invitational Tournament 3, losing only to Cloud 9 Eclipse. After the tournament, the roster disbanded and Cabochard moved on to join GSI Gaming.

After only a month on the team, Cabochard left and rejoined Heavy Botlane. Another short stint on the team led to him being picked up by Ninjas in Pyjamas. His first tournament with NiP was Summer Series #2. The team ended up coming in 2nd in the tournament, losing to SK Gaming Prime in the final. He also competed with the team in the FACEIT Challenger Invitational 3, where the team came in 1st place.

NiP's performance in the last summer series meant that they had secured their spot in the Summer Playoffs. Cabochard and the team finished 4th, losing to Unicorns of Love in the 3rd place match. The team then played in the FACEIT Gamescom Challenge and finished 2nd, losing to H2k-Gaming in the final. The team also managed a 3rd-place finish at 2014 Black Monster Cup Europe Fall.

Soon after this, Ninjas in Pyjamas disbanded and Cabochard joined Gambit Gaming.

=== 2015 season ===
After being voted in by fans, Gambit Gaming were invited to IEM Cologne. They managed to win the tournament after beating Counter Logic Gaming in the finals and qualifying for the IEM Season IX - World Championship.

Gambit Gaming had a successful 2015 EU LCS Spring Split, finishing 4th in the regular season, partially due to Cabochard's impressive performances on Kennen and Morgana. In the playoffs they were beaten 3-1 by Unicorns Of Love in the quarterfinals.

At the IEM Season IX - World Championship, after a Round 1 loss against the CJ Entus, Gambit was eliminated after a lost to Team WE in Round 1 of the losers bracket.

Cabochard and the team had an unsuccessful Summer Split, eventually finishing the regular season in 8th place, forcing the team to play in the 2016 Spring Promotion. Cabochard and the team faced mousesports, winning the series and securing their place in the 2016 Spring Season.

=== 2016 season ===
Cabochard joined Team Vitality after the organization bought Gambit's LCS spot. On 14 December 2016 Cabochard was announced for the roster and signed a one-year contract. He was the only member of the Gambit squad to be kept on Vitality's roster.

With himself, Shook, Nukeduck, Hjärnan, and kaSing comprising the roster, the team was considered one of the top lineups in the LCS. Vitality finished the split in third place behind the surprise first-place G2 Esports and second-place H2k. In the playoffs, however, they were upset by the sixth-place Fnatic and eliminated in the quarterfinals.

== Achievements ==
=== Gambit Gaming ===
- 1st - IEM Season IX - Cologne

=== Karmine Corp ===
- 1st — EU Masters 2021 Summer
- 1st — EU Masters 2022 Spring
