= Sujoy Roy =

British professional online gamer

Sujoy

Personal information
- Name: Sujoy Roy
- Born: September 1975 (age 51)

Career information
- Games: Quake

Sujoy Roy (born September 1975) is a former professional online gamer based in the United Kingdom. He lives in Camden, Central London.

While studying at Cambridge University, Roy started playing the computer game Quake online against other players, and found that he had quite an aptitude for the game. Through an online server, he found that he was one of the best players in Europe. He spent many hours online, making full use of the high-speed 'JANET' connection Universities were graced with (offering a stable ~20 ping), and competed with clan Demonic Core. He is also credited with discovering how to rocketjump out of deep lava on the Quake 1 level DM4, a demo of him performing this move spread quickly around the Quake community and is now a common move in many FPS games. In the days before broadband Internet was available, he installed an ISDN line in his bedroom to improve his online performance.

Roy graduated from Cambridge University with an M.A. in Natural Sciences. After graduating from Cambridge, he took up a job at the merchant bank, JP Morgan, working on New York City's Wall Street, and regularly being shuttled between London and New York City.

Sujoy has appeared on many TV programmes on the main United Kingdom networks and satellite channels. He has also been interviewed by major newspapers and magazines, including the Financial Times and Sunday Times, as well as many computer magazines.

Sponsorships and endorsements included the Razer Boomslang mouse, probably the first mouse designed for online gamers. Sujoy had this mouse custom painted with the Union Jack by a motorcycle helmet artist, and it was a signature item at tournaments in which he competed.

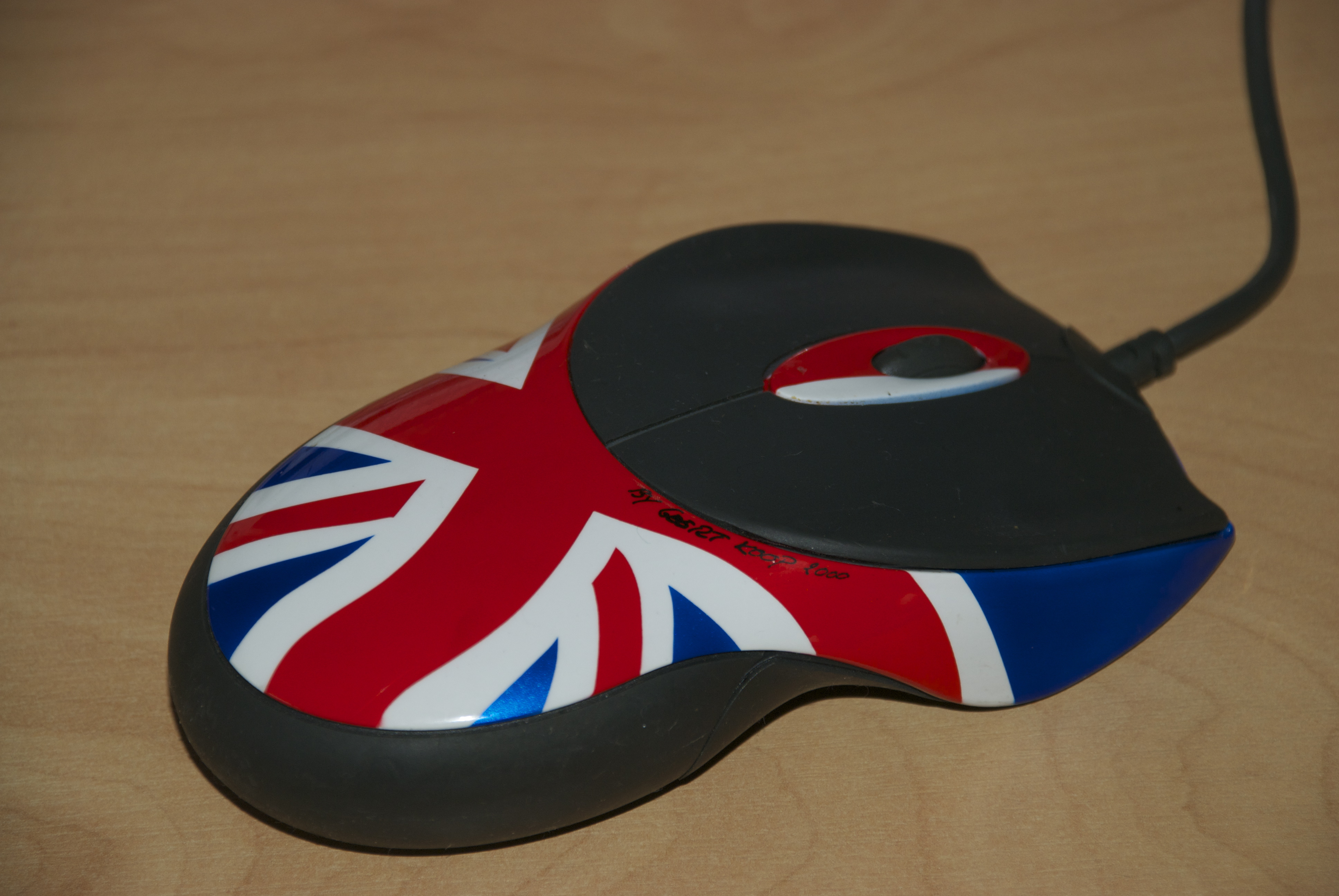
Sujoy's custom painted Razer gaming mouse

Sujoy retired from online gaming in 2001–2002 following the dotcom crash and set about organising multiplayer tournaments in the UK. Along with business partner, Dominic Mulroy, Sujoy helped found the VGA (Virtual Gaming Alliance), an organisation of internet gaming centres throughout the United Kingdom. Sujoy founded two Multiplayer Lan Gaming Centres named after his community website ESReality, one in Harrow, West London and the other in Maidenhead, Berks. In 2006, with the release of Quake 4 Sujoy briefly returned to compete at several competitions. However, success proved elusive and he slipped back into retirement shortly after.

In 2008 Sujoy was involved in launching Omega Sektor and managed the London Mint professional gaming team that competed in the Championship Gaming Series.

In December 2007 Sujoy launched Gamerbase, a gaming centre located within the HMV store at the London Trocadero in Piccadilly Circus. Gamerbase was acquired by the high street entertainment chain, HMV, in October 2008 and Sujoy subsequently joined HMV in a managerial capacity to oversee the technical aspects of Gamerbase.

Gamerbase won the Retail Innovation award in 2009 from MCV, the leading UK video games trade magazine. Sujoy has opened three further Gamerbase stores in the UK inside HMV stores in Manchester, Glasgow and Reading.
