= Lourlo =

American professional esports player

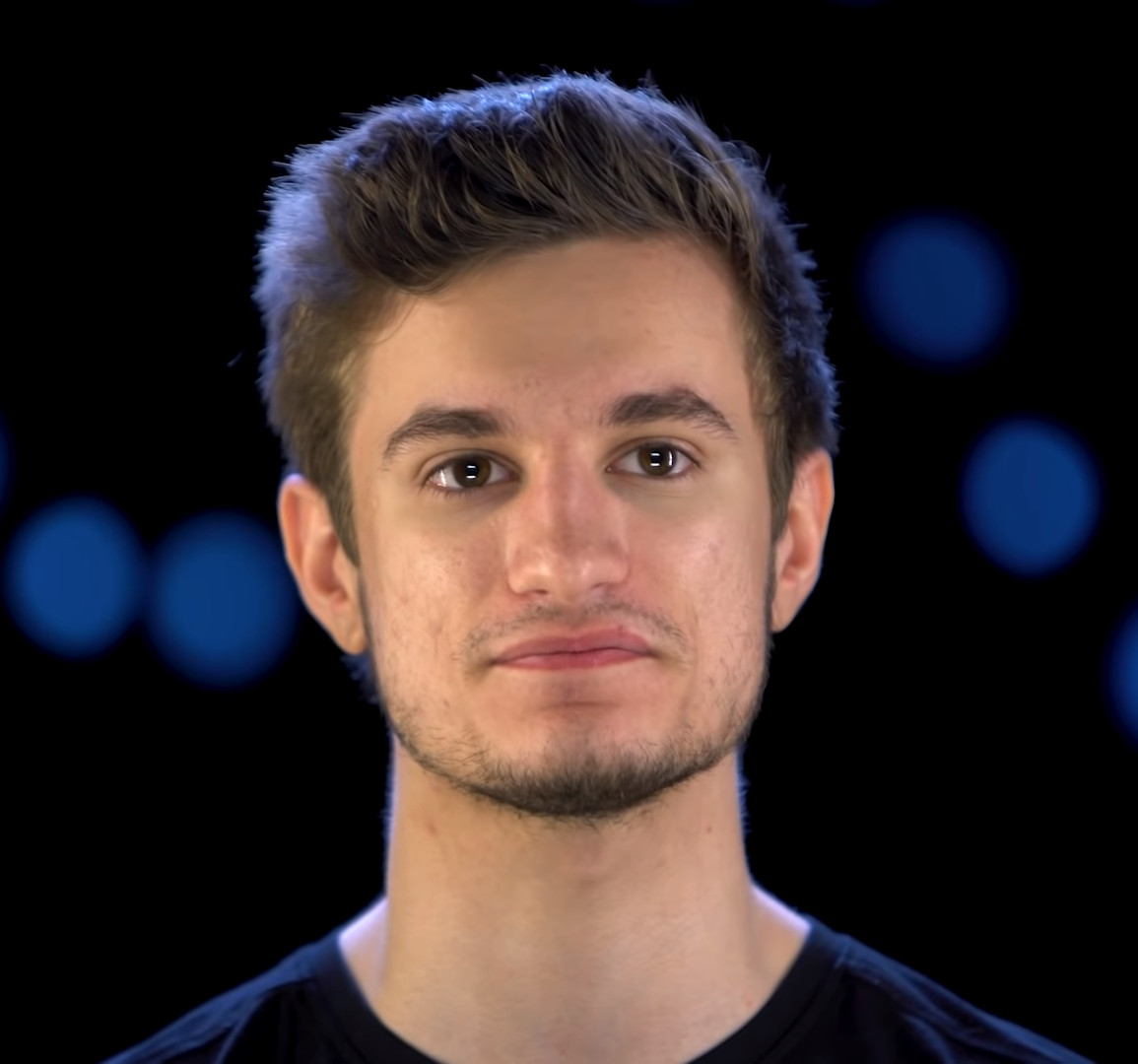
- Jackson in 2019

Personal information
- Name: Samson Jackson
- Born: March 24, 1998 (age 28)
- Nationality: American

Current team
- Team: Team Liquid
- Role: Streamer (Top Laner)
- Game: League of Legends
- League: LCS

Career information
- Playing career: 2012–present

Team history
- 2012: Severity Gaming
- 2014: Also Known As
- 2014–2015: Storm
- 2015: CLG Black
- 2016–2017: Team Liquid
- 2018: Golden Guardians
- 2019: Echo Fox
- 2020–2021: Dignitas Academy

Samson Jackson, better known by his in-game name Lourlo (/ˈlɔːrloʊ/), is an American professional League of Legends player who played as a top laner in the LCS for Team Liquid, Golden Guardians, Echo Fox and Dignitas, as well as several academy teams. He is currently a streamer and content creator for Team Liquid.

== Personal life ==
Samson "Lourlo" Jackson started gaming by playing World of Warcraft and has since played Hearthstone, Diablo, Bloodline Champions, and League of Legends.

== Career ==
=== 2015 Season ===
Lourlo joined CLG Black in 2015, beginning to play for them in the second week of the NACS Spring Season. The team placed 6th and last in the season, after losing a tiebreaker game to TSM Darkness.

=== 2016 Season ===
In January, Team Liquid announced Lourlo as their top laner for the 2016 NA LCS Spring Season. Liquid's spring split started out rocky, with an 0-2 in the first week. Eventually, they climbed into a fourth-place regular-season finish. In playoffs, they advanced to the semifinals, where they lost a narrow five-game series to CLG (the eventual champions). In the third-place series against the tournament-favorite Immortals who had been knocked down in an upset by TSM, Liquid lost once again, this time 0–3, to finish the playoffs in fourth place overall and continuing their "fourth-place curse."

Team Liquid boot camped in Korea in order to increase the skill of their players. During this time, Lourlo's rocky rookie split was brought into question and Team Liquid Academy top laner Zig was brought to Korea to fight for his spot. After Lourlo won his spot back, Team Liquid faced CLG in the first round of playoffs, where they lost 1–3. In the Regional qualifier, Team Liquid lost 3-0 to Team nV and failed to reach the World Championship.

=== 2020 Season ===
Lourlo signed with Dignitas Academy during the 2020 offseason. They finished second in the Academy regular season but placed 3rd/4th in the playoffs after losing to Evil Geniuses Academy in the semifinals. Lourlo continued to play for Dignitas Academy for the summer but was called up to the main LCS roster after at the start of week three and played there until the end of week six. He played with Dignitas Academy for the rest of the year.

=== 2021 Season ===
Lourlo continued to play with Dignitas Academy for the entirety of the 2021 competitive season. He parted ways with Dignitas at the end of the year.

== Post professional career ==
In 2022, Lourlo transitioned away from professional play and signed for Team Liquid as a content creator and streamer. As of August 2026, he remains with Team Liquid.
