= Jinro (gamer) =

Swedish esports player

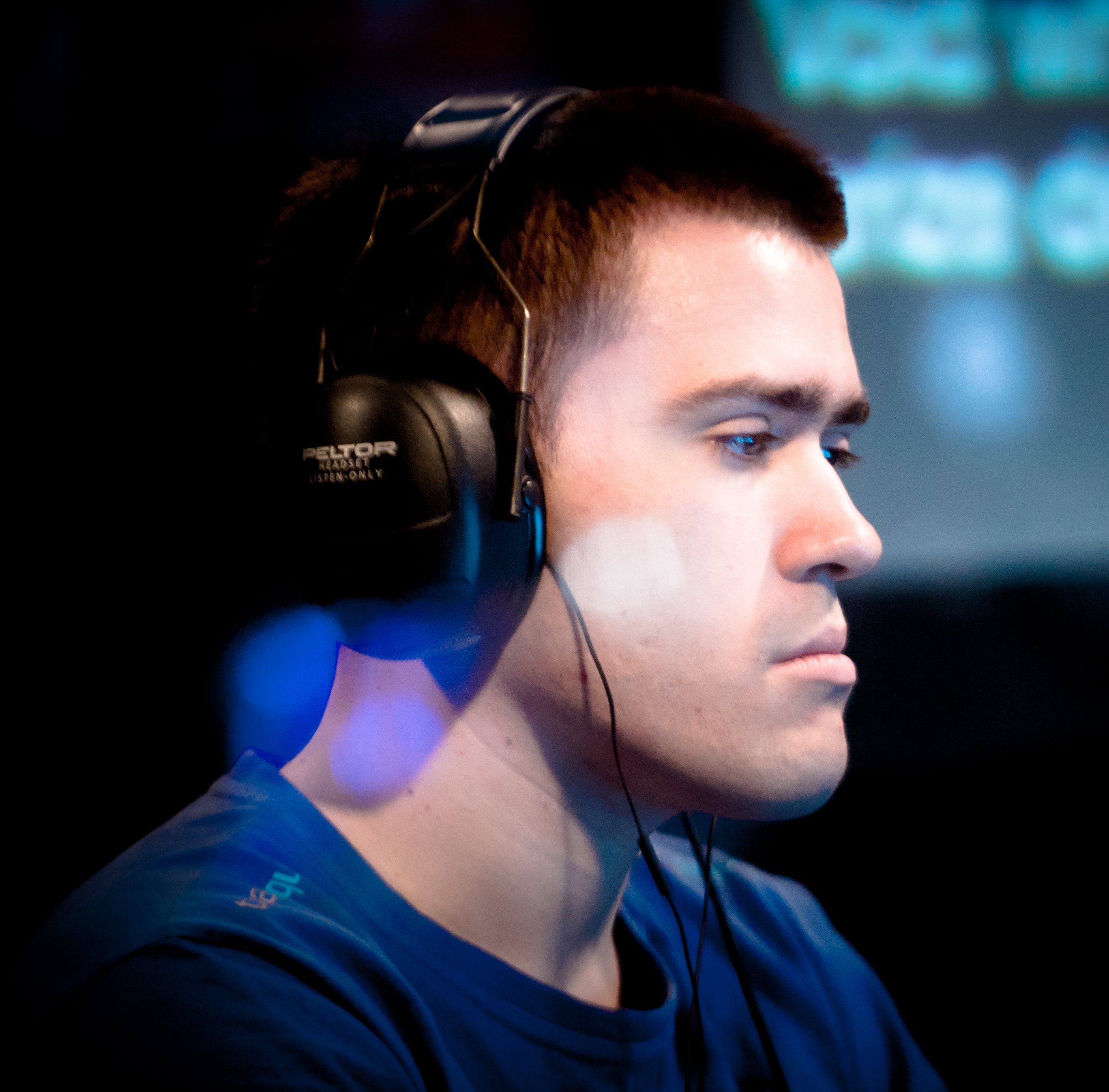
- Walsh at MLG Anaheim 2011

Personal information
- Name: Jonathan Walsh
- Nationality: Swedish

Career information
- Games: StarCraft: Brood War; StarCraft II
- Playing career: Until 2012

Team history
- 2010–2012: Team Liquid

Jonathan Walsh, nicknamed Jinro, is a retired Swedish professional StarCraft 2 player. He lives in South Korea, and played for Team Liquid in the GOMTV Global Starcraft II League (GSL). Jinro used to live in the oGs (Old Generations) team house, which was due to an agreement between oGs and Team Liquid. With the breakup of oGs, Jinro has found a new house with fellow Team Liquid players TLO, Hero, and Haypro. He plays as Terran. Jinro became the first non-Korean to reach the semi-finals in GSL Season 3. Jinro then went on to reach the semi-finals a second time. So far, Jinro is the only foreigner to reach the Ro4 in GSL. In November 2010 he won the Major League Gaming Starcraft 2 tournament in Dallas. His nickname comes from the Korean distiller Jinro.

On August 7, 2012, Jinro retired from pro-gaming.

== Tournament results ==
Jinro earned a total of US$28,034.98 in prize money during his career.

=== 2010 ===
- 1st MLG Dallas 2010 - November 7, 2010 ($6,250)
- 3rd-4th GSL Open Season 3 - December 18, 2010 (~$8,700)

=== 2011 ===
- 3rd-4th GSL Code S January 2011 - January 29, 2011 (~$4,500)
- 1st Clash of the Titans Showmatch ($1,500)
