= KiWiKiD =

American professional esports player

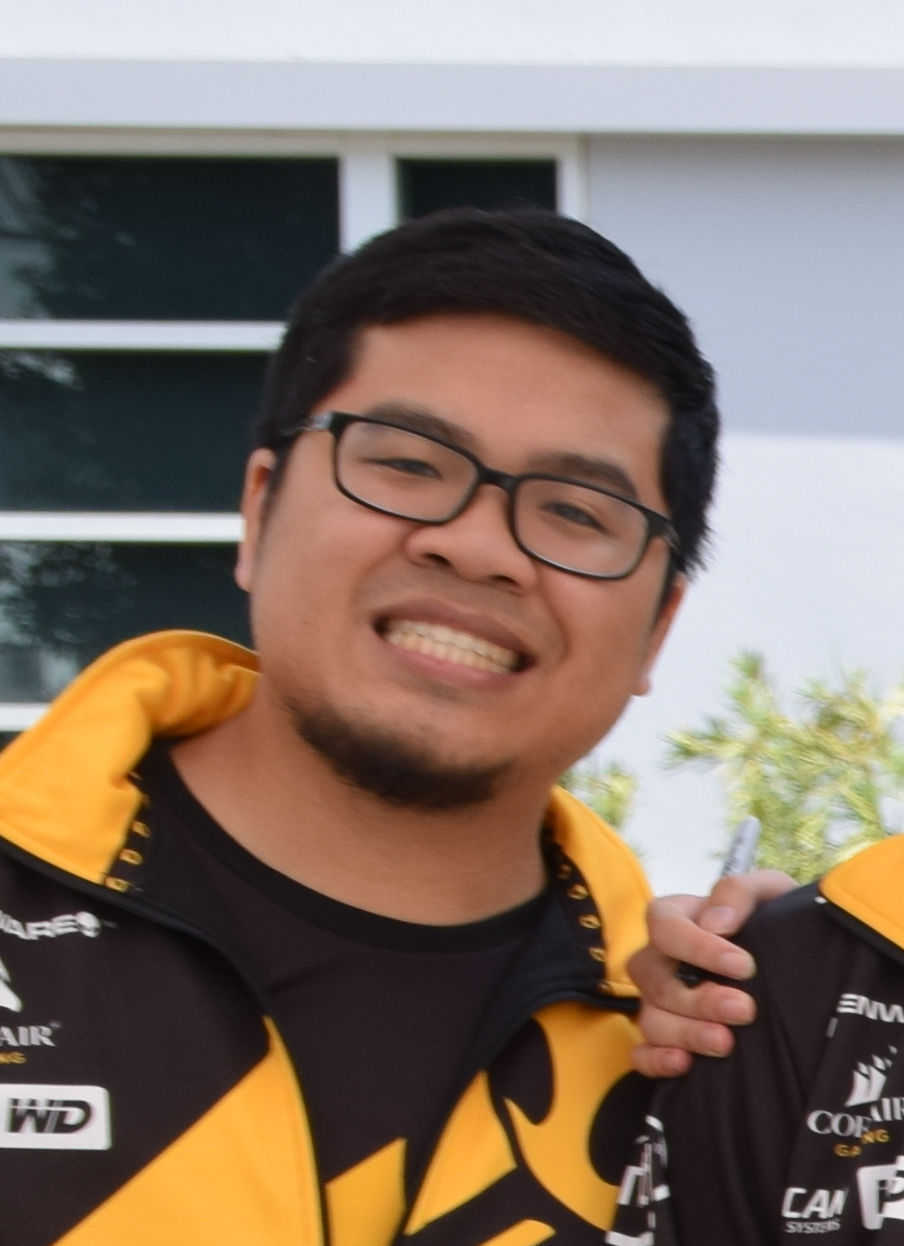
- Nguyen in 2015

Personal information
- Name: Alan Nguyen
- Nationality: American

Career information
- Game: League of Legends
- Playing career: Until 2016
- Role: Support

Team history
- 2011–2012: UT Austin
- 2012–2016: Team Dignitas
- 2016: NRG Esports

Alan Nguyen better known as KiWiKiD is an American League of Legends player who was the support player for NRG eSports. He was considering retirement from professional play and returning to school.

In November 2015 Team Dignitas added him to their roster.

He recruited for NRG eSports upon that team's entry into the LCS.

Nguyen attended the University of Texas at Austin from 2011 to 2012 and played on the schools IvyLoL team.

== Tournament placements ==
=== Dignitas ===
- SF — IEM IX Cologne

=== NRG eSports ===
- ? — 2016 Spring NA LCS
- 9th — 2016 NA LCS Summer regular season
- lost — 2017 Spring NA LCS promotion
