= Mike LaBelle =

American professional esports player

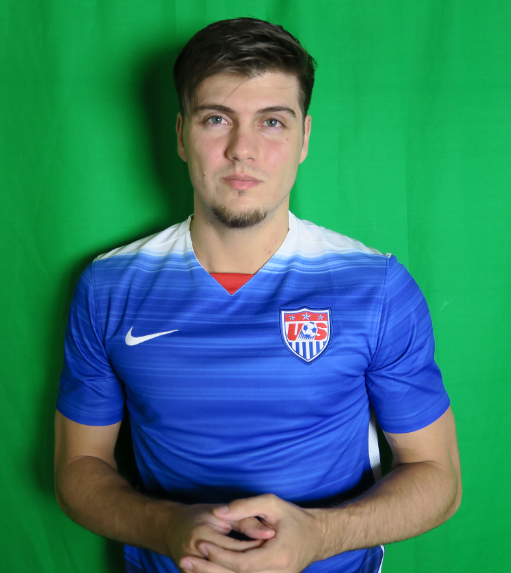

Personal information
- Nickname: Dirty Mike
- Born: Michael LaBelle; September 21, 1989 (age 37); Houston, Texas
- Nationality: American

Current team
- Team: New York Red Bulls
- Game: FIFA series

Career information
- Playing career: 2006–present

Team history
- 2019–present: New York Red Bulls
Honors
WCG National
Third place	Orlando, Florida	FIFA 07
Second place	Los Angeles, California	FIFA 08
Second place	Manhattan, New York	FIFA 09
Second place	Durham, North Carolina	FIFA 13

Michael LaBelle (born September 21, 1989), is a web-based entertainer, video producer, and a professional FIFA player for New York Red Bulls, previously known by the pseudonyms michs09 and Dirty Mike. He is known mostly for providing tips via nontraditional methods to gamers through YouTube and Twitch outlets.

== Playing career ==
LaBelle began his professional esports career in 2006 after qualifying for the World Final of the FIFA Interactive World Cup (FIWC). LaBelle has won seven national titles in FIFA, and represented the United States at the FIWC, ESWC (Electronic Sports World Cup), WCG (World Cyber Games), VG World Finals (Virgin Gaming), IeSF World Championship (International Esports Federation), WSVG (World Series of Video Games), Hyundai Global Championship, WCG Pan American Championship and as an ESL (Electronic Sports League) Major Series Player.

In 2018, LaBelle signed with the New York Red Bulls as an esports competitor.

== Entertainer ==
Since May 2016, LaBelle's channel has grown to over 283,000 subscribers and received over 37 million total views. He has been featured in the Houston Chronicle and Houston Press. He has also been featured on TV shows WCG Ultimate Gamer (Season 2) and Great Day Houston with Deborah Duncan on KHOU.

LaBelle had his celebration motion captured and featured in FIFA 14 (Le Cirque LaBelle).

He has also worked as a gaming analyst and host for KICKTV and Copa90.

As of May 2016, LaBelle is sponsored by SteelSeries, G2A, and EGSPN.

== Accomplishments ==
FIFA 15

- ESWC Grand Final (Paris, France) - 9th-16th place
- World Series of Video Games World Final (Maldives) - 5th-8th place
- World Series of Video Games National Qualifier - 1st place

FIFA 14

- KICK.TV Best Goal Competition - 1st place
- KICK.TV World Cup Invitational - 5th-8th place

FIFA 13

- Virgin Gaming Challenge Series World Final (Las Vegas, Nevada) - 32/256

FIFA 12

- Gamestop Virgin Gaming $50,000 Final Bracket - 3rd/4th (Xbox 360)
- Gamestop Virgin Gaming $50,000 Final Bracket - 5th-8th place (PS3)
- Virgin Gaming Challenge Series World Final (Manhattan, New York) - 64/256
- WCG Pan American Championship (Santiago, Chile) - 5th-8th place

FIFA 11

- IeSF World Championship (Andong, Korea) - 5th-8th place
- WCG Pan American Championship (São Paulo, Brazil) - 4th place

FIFA 10

- Hyundai Global FIFA Championship (Busan, Korea) - 9th -16th place
- IeSF Challenge World Championship (Daegu, Korea) - Group

FIFA 09

- ESL Major Series Player
- FIWC National Final (Manhattan, New York) - 2nd place
- Gillette Tournament of Champions Finals - 4th place
- WCG Grand Final (Chengdu, China) - Group
- WCG National Final (Manhattan, New York) - 2nd place
- WCG National Final Qualifier (West Region) - 1st place
- WCG US Open Invitational (Manhattan, New York) - 3rd place

FIFA 08

- CGS Taxi player for Chicago Chimera (Championship Gaming Series)
- FIWC Grand Final (Berlin, Germany) - 9th-16th place
- FIWC North American Regional (Los Angeles, California) - 1st place
- WCG Grand Final (Cologne, Germany) - Group

FIFA 07

- FIWC Grand Finalist (Amsterdam, Netherlands) - 9th-16th place

== Personal life ==
LaBelle was born on September 21, 1989, in Houston, Texas. As a child, he played games such as Duck Hunt and Mario Kart.
