= Apollo (gamer) =

British esports commentator

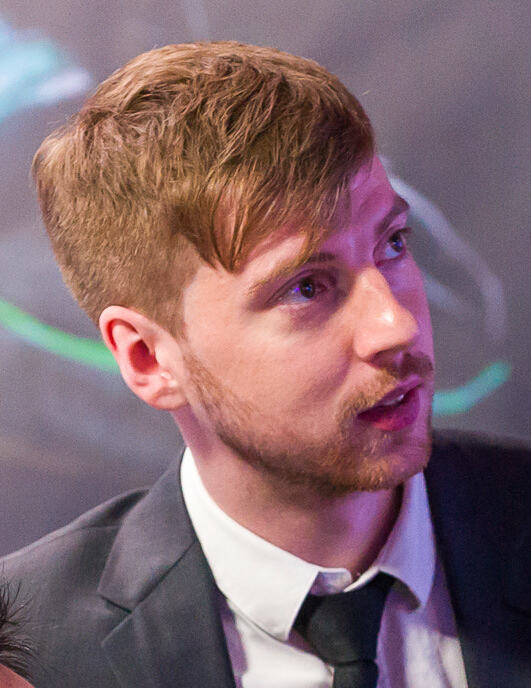
- Clark in 2014

Personal information
- Name: Shaun Clark
- Born: 14 October 1989 (age 37)
- Nationality: English

Career information
- Games: Command & Conquer 3

Shaun Clark (born 14 October 1989 in Staffordshire), also known by the handle, Apollo, is an esports commentator and former professional player. Apollo started his career as part of Team Dignitas playing Command & Conquer 3. A highlight of his time playing that game was coming in first place at the 2007 World Cyber Games. In 2009 Apollo retired from playing Command And Conquer and started playing poker and StarCraft: Brood War awaiting the release of StarCraft II: Wings of Liberty.

Shaun Clark moved to South Korea in the summer of 2010 to live with Nick “Tasteless” Plott who pushed him to go more into the direction of commentating StarCraft II, although his original goal was becoming a professional player. After arriving home, Apollo applied for a casting position alongside Sean “Day[9]” Plott at the Intel Extreme Masters in Cologne, Germany.

After casting with Sean Plott, Apollo's career got another boost from casting with John “Totalbiscuit” Bain at Multiplay UK i40. After working with The GD Studio for a year, Apollo joined ESL TV where he is casting the World Championship Series for Starcraft 2.
