= Gogoing =

Retired Chinese League of Legends player

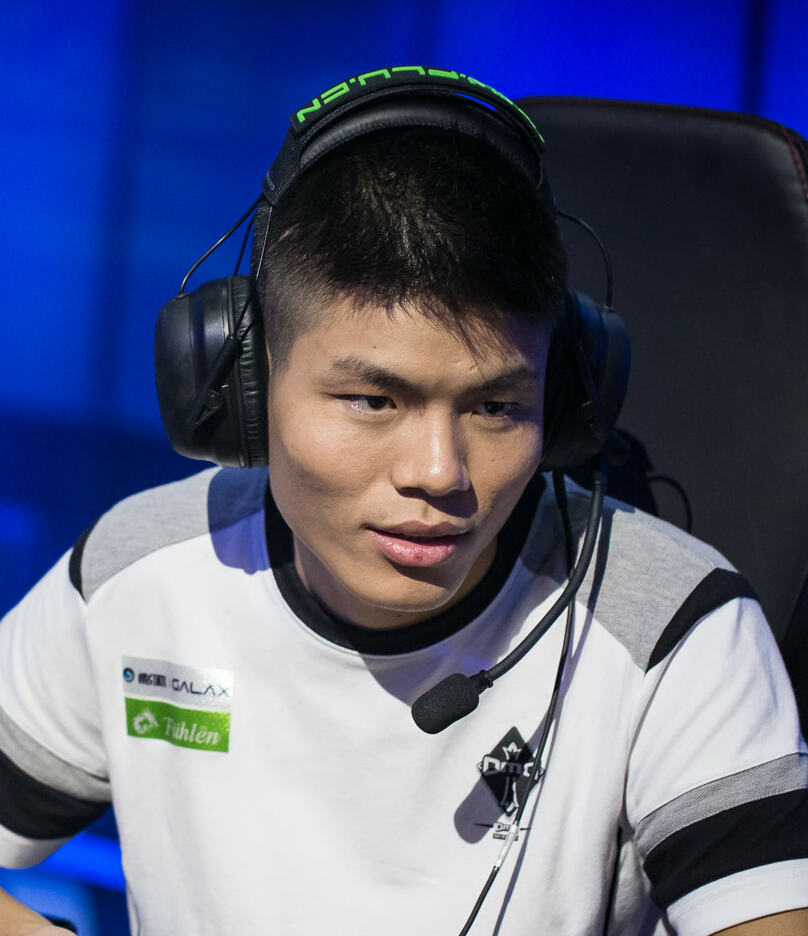
- Gao in 2015

Personal information
- Name: 高地平 (Gao Diping)
- Nationality: Chinese

Career information
- Games: League of Legends
- Playing career: 2012–2015
- Role: Top lane

Team history
- 2012–2015: Oh My God

Gao Diping (born October 17, 1991), better known as Gogoing, is a Chinese retired professional League of Legends player. He is a notable player of the "Top Lane" position, renowned for his Garen (a character of League of Legends) play. He has had high achievements both in the Chinese league as well as internationally. Gao, in his prime, has been considered by many analysts and other players in the League of Legends scene as one of the most mechanically skillful players and top top lane players, particularly in 2014. Gao retired in 2015.

In August 2016, Gogoing announced the formation of a new team, Go Dream, but he would serve as the manager and not a player.As of 2025, there has been no news regarding the establishment of this team.

== Tournament results ==
=== OMG ===
- 5–8th — 2013 League of Legends World Championship
- 1st — 2013 LPL Spring
- 2nd — 2013 LPL Summer
- 2nd — 2013 WCG Grand Prix
- 3rd — 2014 LPL Spring
- 2nd — 2014 LPL Summer
- 3–4th — 2014 League of Legends World Championship
- 5–8th — 2015 LPL Spring
- 7th — 2015 LPL Summer
