= SuperGirlKels =

Canadian esports player

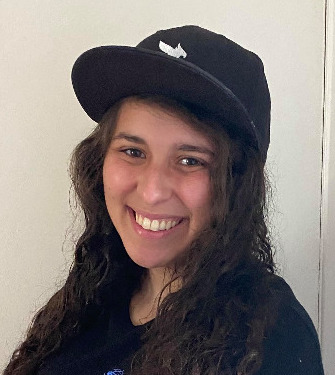
- Medeiros in 2021

Personal information
- Name: Kelsy Medeiros
- Born: May 20, 1995 (age 31)
- Nationality: Canadian

Career information
- Game: Super Smash Bros. for Wii U; Super Smash Bros. Ultimate
- Playing career: 2014–present

Kelsy Medeiros (born May 20, 1995), known professionally as SuperGirlKels, is a Canadian professional Super Smash Bros. player. Medeiros's competitive gaming career spanned from 2014 until her retirement in 2023, during which she competed in Super Smash Bros. for Wii U and Super Smash Bros. Ultimate tournaments using the character Sonic the Hedgehog.

== Biography ==
Kelsy Medeiros was born on May 20, 1995. From a young age, Medeiros played video games like Sonic the Hedgehog and Super Smash Bros. with her family. When she was 16 years old, she decided to attend the Super Smash Bros. tournament Apex 2012 while her family was taking a vacation in New York. As she was too young to travel to tournaments, she spent the following three years training through the game's online multiplayer services.

In addition to her activities as a competitive Super Smash Bros. player, Medeiros previously worked full-time for French game developer Ubisoft. Her younger brother, Jayson "Soar" Medeiros, has also played Super Smash Bros. competitively and was previously sponsored by Quebec team Mirage Esports. The siblings have competed as a team for doubles events.

== Career ==
=== Super Smash Bros. for Wii U ===
Medeiros formally began competing in tournaments in 2014. Competing in the Super Smash Bros. for Wii U event at Apex 2015, she placed within the top 64 of competitors. Returning to the same event at Apex 2016, she defeated top professional Jason "Mew2King" Zimmerman in an upset victory and ultimately placed in 5th. Later that year, she won the Super Smash Bros. event held at Lan ETS and placed 33rd at Super Smash Con.

2017 saw Medeiros place 2nd at Lan ETS, 5th at Royal Flush, 65th at Evo 2017, and 7th at DreamHack Montreal. In 2018, she took 1st place at Lan ETS and placed 5th at DreamHack Montreal. 2018 power rankings presented by esports team Panda Global (Note: The Panda Global Rankings are peer-administered power rankings of Super Smash Bros. players generally respected by the competitive gaming community.) ranked Medeiros as the 100th best Super Smash Bros. for Wii U player of all time.

=== Super Smash Bros. Ultimate ===
Medeiros signed with esports team Iceberg Competitive Esports in February 2018. After the organization dissolved later that year, Medeiros told CBC News in 2019 that it had failed to fulfill the terms of her contract, including salary payments. In 2019, Medeiros provided commentary for Nintendo's Super Smash Bros. Ultimate World Championship. At the tournament Frostbite 2020, she placed 97th individually and teamed with her brother to place 13th in the doubles event. When a wave of sexual abuse allegations emerged in the competitive community in 2020, Medeiros spoke to CBC News on the need for greater awareness of the issue of abuse within the community. Medeiros announced her retirement from Super Smash Bros. competition in 2023.

== Style of play ==
Medeiros primarily competed in Super Smash Bros. tournaments using the character Sonic the Hedgehog. A profile by esports publication The Meta described her play style as "always on the attack, probing her opponent's defenses and lunging for the carotid the moment she detects an opening." Medeiros cited professional Super Smash Bros. Melee competitor Jeffrey "Axe" Williamson, who plays the game with a similar "in-your-face" style, as an inspiration.
