= LucifroN =

Spanish professional gamer

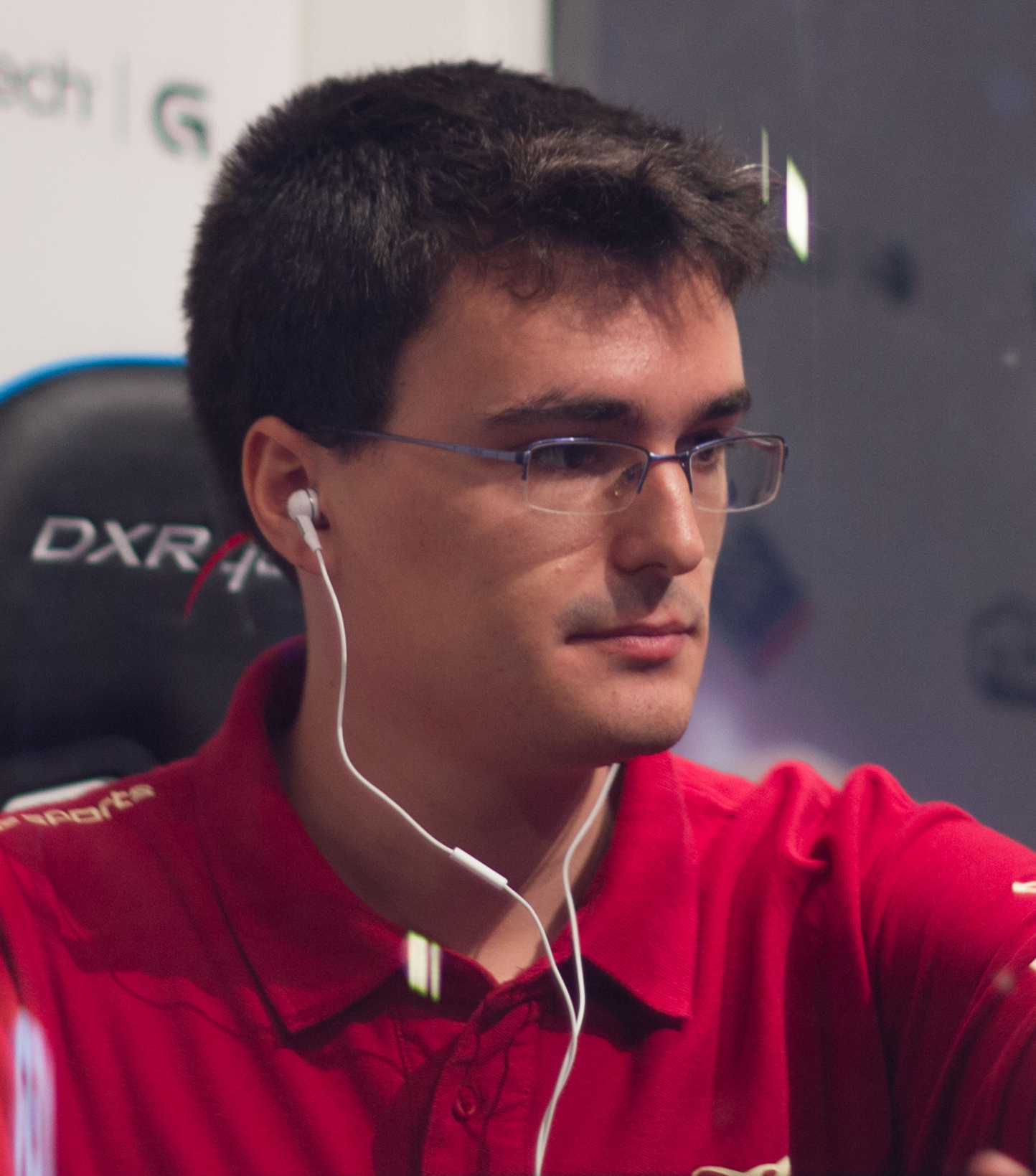
- LucifroN playing in a tournament in 2013

Personal information
- Name: Pedro Moreno Durán
- Born: 1991 or 1992 (age 34–35)
- Nationality: Spanish

Career information
- Games: Warcraft III: The Frozen Throne, StarCraft II; Heroes of the Storm; Warcraft III: Reforged

Pedro Moreno Durán (born 1991–1992), also known as LucifroN, is a Spanish professional gamer. He started his career in Warcraft III: The Frozen Throne and later competed in both StarCraft II and Heroes of the Storm.

== Career ==
According to El Mundo, Durán is one of the most famous Spanish professional gamers, and one of the few able to make a living playing games by 2012. In 2014, ABC described him as a Spanish esports star. In 2019, madridiario described Durán as Spanish "esports elite".

=== Warcraft III ===
When playing Warcraft III: The Frozen Throne, Durán became the world championship runner-up by finishing second on Blizzcon 2008. One year later he won the European Championship. He also placed 3rd at the Blizzcon 2009 European qualifier and won the Electronic Sports World Cup Masters of Cheonan. This was the first, and to date only, gold medal for Spain in the competition.

In March 2020, Durán and his brother Juan “VortiX” Moreno Durán were directly invited to a Warcraft III: Reforged event called ESL Masters Espana, a competition for Spanish and Portuguese, which was a qualification event for future DreamHack events. The brothers were the favourites to win the 3000 Euro prize pool.

=== StarCraft II ===
Durán switched to competing in StarCraft II, shortly after its 2010 release. By 2012, he was salaried by Karont3 and earned advertising revenue by livestreaming his gameplay. Durán and his brother VortiX were among the first international SC2 players to compete against Korean players who dominated the scene.

Durán participated in several international tournaments, winning The Gathering and the IPL D.I.C.E Showdown among others.

In 2011, Durán won the first season of Spain's Liga de Videojuegos Profesional(Professional Video Game League). In 2012, after an upset, he lost to his brother and fellow favourite VortiX in the semifinals of LVP Season 2. In May 2012, Durán and his brother VortiX represented Spain in the StarCraft II World Championship Series.

In 2013, Durán retired from competitive StarCraft II to focus on his computer engineering studies, but returned in October 2014 to compete in a new edition of the LVP, called the StarCraft II Master Circuit. In January 2016, shortly after retiring from Heroes of the Storm, Durán participated in a qualifying event for that year's IEM Katowice event, losing in the Round of 32.

=== Heroes of the Storm ===
In Heroes of the Storm Durán played for Team Liquid, winning several tournaments, most notably three DreamHacks. Durán stepped down from Team Liquid's Heroes of the Storm roster and retired from competitive play in 2016 to complete his bachelor's degree.
