= MaRin =

South Korean League of Legends player

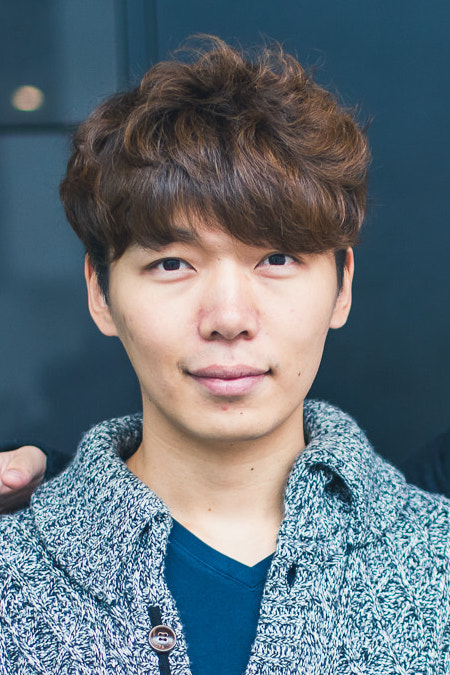
- MaRin In 2015

Personal information
- Name: Jang Gyeong-hwan
- Born: 1990 or 1991 (age 34–35)
- Nationality: Korean

Career information
- Games: League of Legends
- Playing career: 2013–2018
- Role: Top Lane

Team history
- 2013–2014: SK Telecom T1 S
- 2014–2015: SK Telecom T1
- 2015–2016: LGD Gaming
- 2016–2017: Afreeca Freecs
- 2018: Topsports Gaming

Career highlights and awards
- World champion (2015); 2015 Worlds MVP; 2x LCK champion

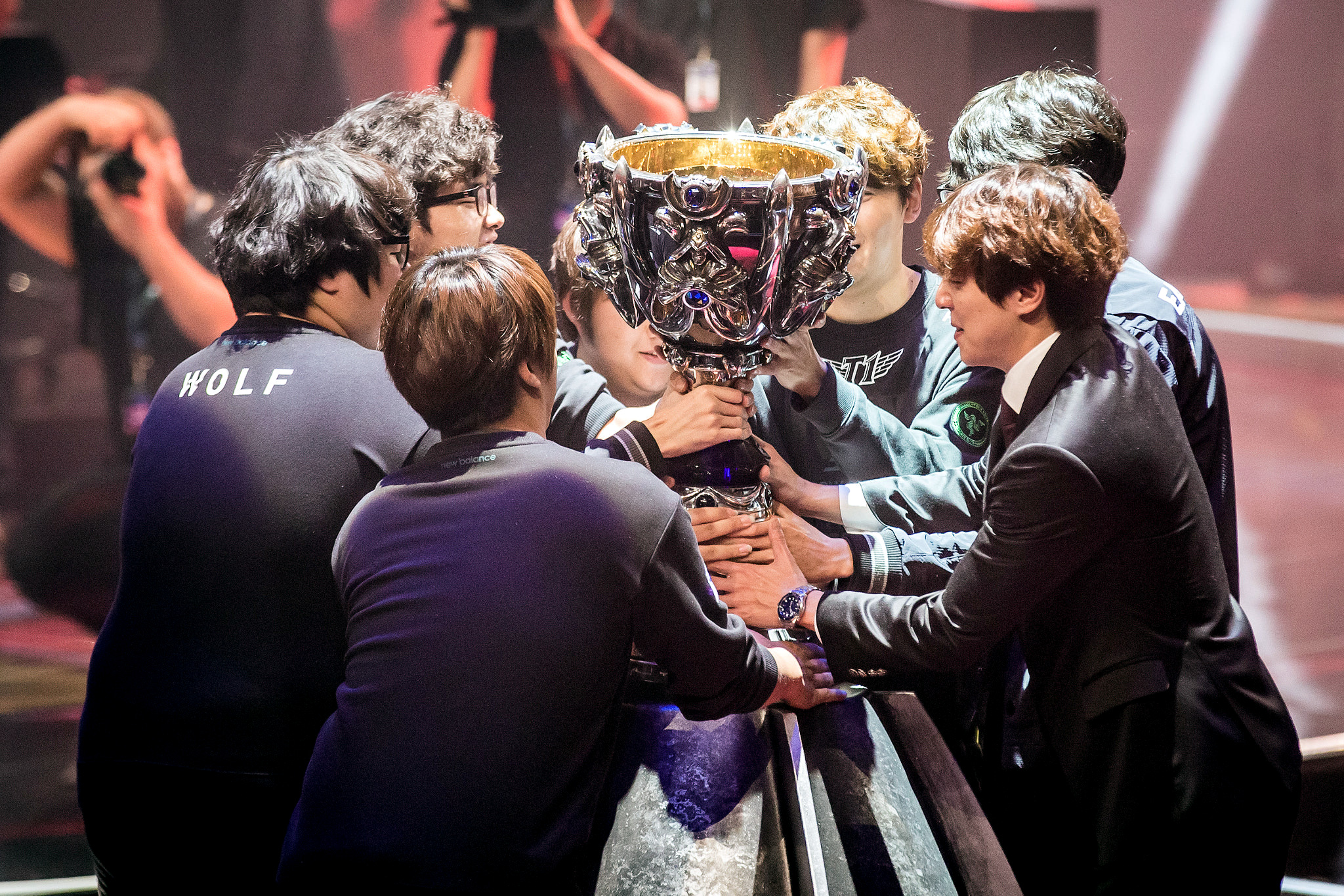
MaRin celebrating after winning the 2015 World Championship.

Jang Gyeong-hwan (Korean: 장경환) better known as MaRin, is a retired League of Legends esports player who was previously the top laner for TopSports Gaming. MaRin won the 2015 League of Legends World Championship with SK Telecom T1 and was named the Most Valuable Player of the event. He also played on SK Telecom T1 S before the team was consolidated with SK Telecom T1 K.

MaRin left SK Telecom T1 shortly after winning 2015 Worlds. On December 10, 2015, it was announced that he had joined LGD Gaming of the League of Legends Pro League (LPL) in Shanghai. He was replaced on the lineup by Lee “Duke” Ho-seong. MaRin returned to Korea's League of Legends Champions Korea (LCK) on December 12, 2016, signing with the Afreeca Freecs.

MaRin's signature champions are considered to be Rumble, Maokai, and Gnar.

== Tournament results ==
- 5th/8th - HOT6iX League of Legends Champions Korea Spring 2014 (SK Telecom T1 S)
- 2nd - SKT LTE-A LoL Masters 2014 (Sk Telecom T1)
- 4th - HOT6iX League of Legends Champions Korea Summer 2014 (SK Telecom T1 S)
- 1st - League of Legends Champions Korea Spring 2015 (SK Telecom T1)
- 2nd - Mid-season invitational 2015 (SK Telecom T1)
- 1st - League of Legends Champions Korea Summer 2015 (SK Telecom T1)
- 1st - 2015 League of Legends World Championship (SK Telecom T1)
- 3rd/4th - NAVER 2015 LoL KeSPA Cup (SK Telecom T1)
- 1st - 2015 All-Star Los Angeles (LCK)
- 7th/8th - 2016 Spring LPL Playoffs (LGD Gaming)
- 2nd - NEST 2016 (LGD Gaming)
