= Bengi (gamer) =

South Korean esports player

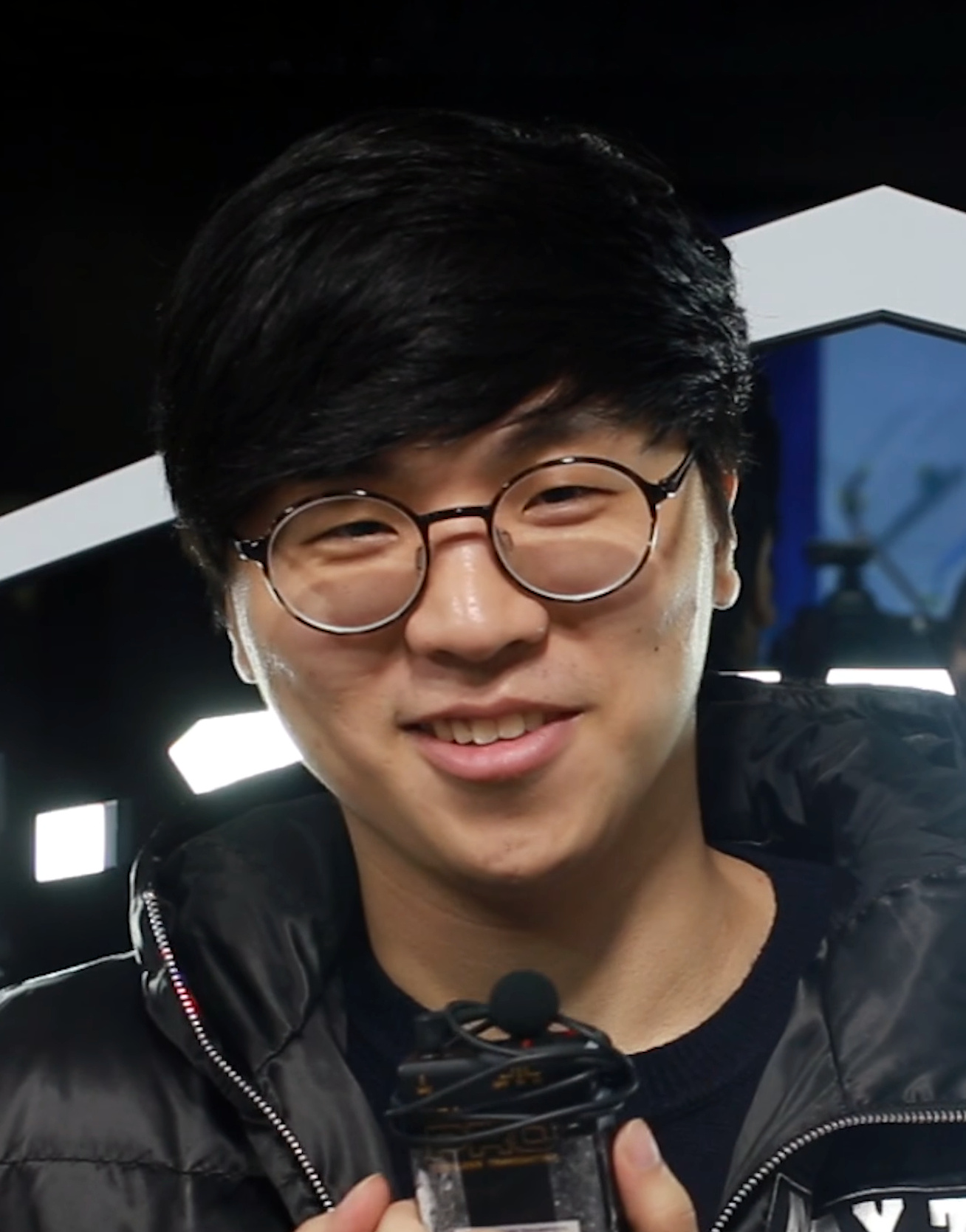
- Bengi in 2017

Personal information
- Name: 배성웅 (Bae Sung-woong)
- Nickname: The Jungle God
- Nationality: South Korean

Career information
- Game: League of Legends
- Playing career: 2012–2017
- Role: Jungler
- Coaching career: 2017–present

Team history

As player:
- 2012–2013: BBT
- 2013–2014: SK Telecom T1 K
- 2014–2016: SK Telecom T1
- 2016–2017: Vici Gaming

As coach:
- 2017–2018: SK Telecom T1
- 2020–2021: T1 Challengers
- 2021–2023: T1
- 2024–present: Dplus KIA

Career highlights and awards
- As player: 3× World champion (2013, 2015, 2016); 5× LCK champion; All-Star Invitational champion (2014); NLB champion (2014); As coach: 1× LCK champion; 1× LCK CL champion

Korean name
- Hangul: 배성웅
- RR: Bae Seongung
- MR: Pae Sŏngung

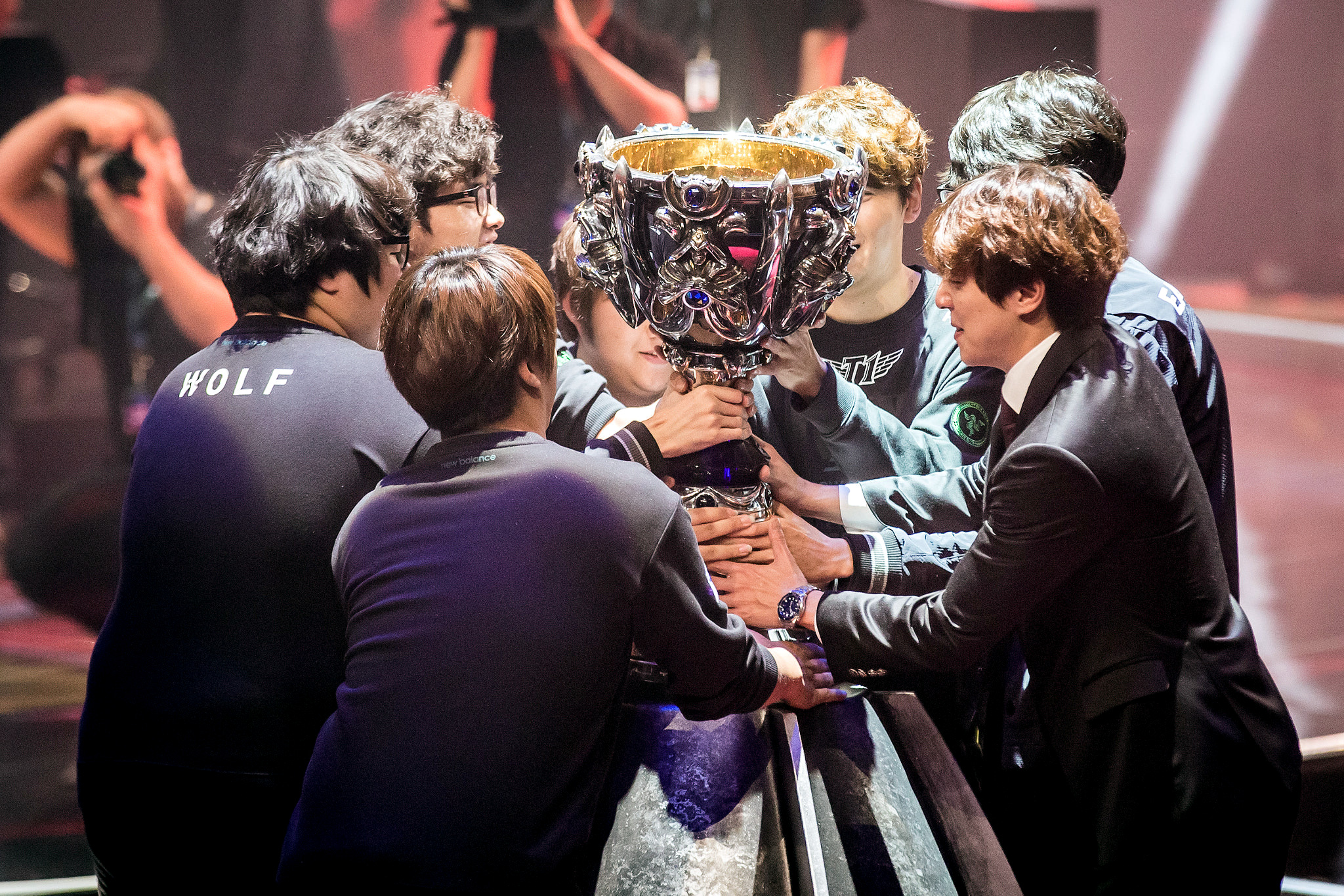
Bengi celebrating after winning the 2015 World Championship.

Bae Sung-woong (Korean: 배성웅), better known as Bengi (벵기), is a South Korean former professional League of Legends player and currently works for head coach for Dplus KIA.

As a professional player, Bengi has won three iterations of the League of Legends World Championships, having done so in 2013, 2015, and 2016. He has also won the All-Star Paris 2014. He owns three different League of Legends skins as a result of winning World Championships, which include SKT T1 Lee Sin (2013), SKT T1 Elise (2015) and SKT T1 Olaf (2016).

== Early life ==
Bengi enlisted in the army on January 28, 2019. He was discharged on September 4, 2020.

== Career ==
Bengi was previously known as JangTa. He started his career with BBT before joining SK Telecom T1 2 in 2013.

On November 27, 2017, he returned as a coach for SK Telecom T1. He parted ways with the team in November 2018.

On November 13, 2020, he rejoined T1 as the head coach for T1 Challengers team.

On December 3, 2021, Bengi was promoted as a coach from T1 Challengers to T1's main roster, which competes in LCK's main stage.

On September 5, 2022, Bengi was assigned as the interim head coach of T1.

On July 08, 2023, he resigned from his position as head coach of T1.

On November 13, 2024, after taking 1.5 years of break, Bengi joined Dplus KIA as head coach.
