= Pinda Rika Dorji =

Bhutanese eSports player

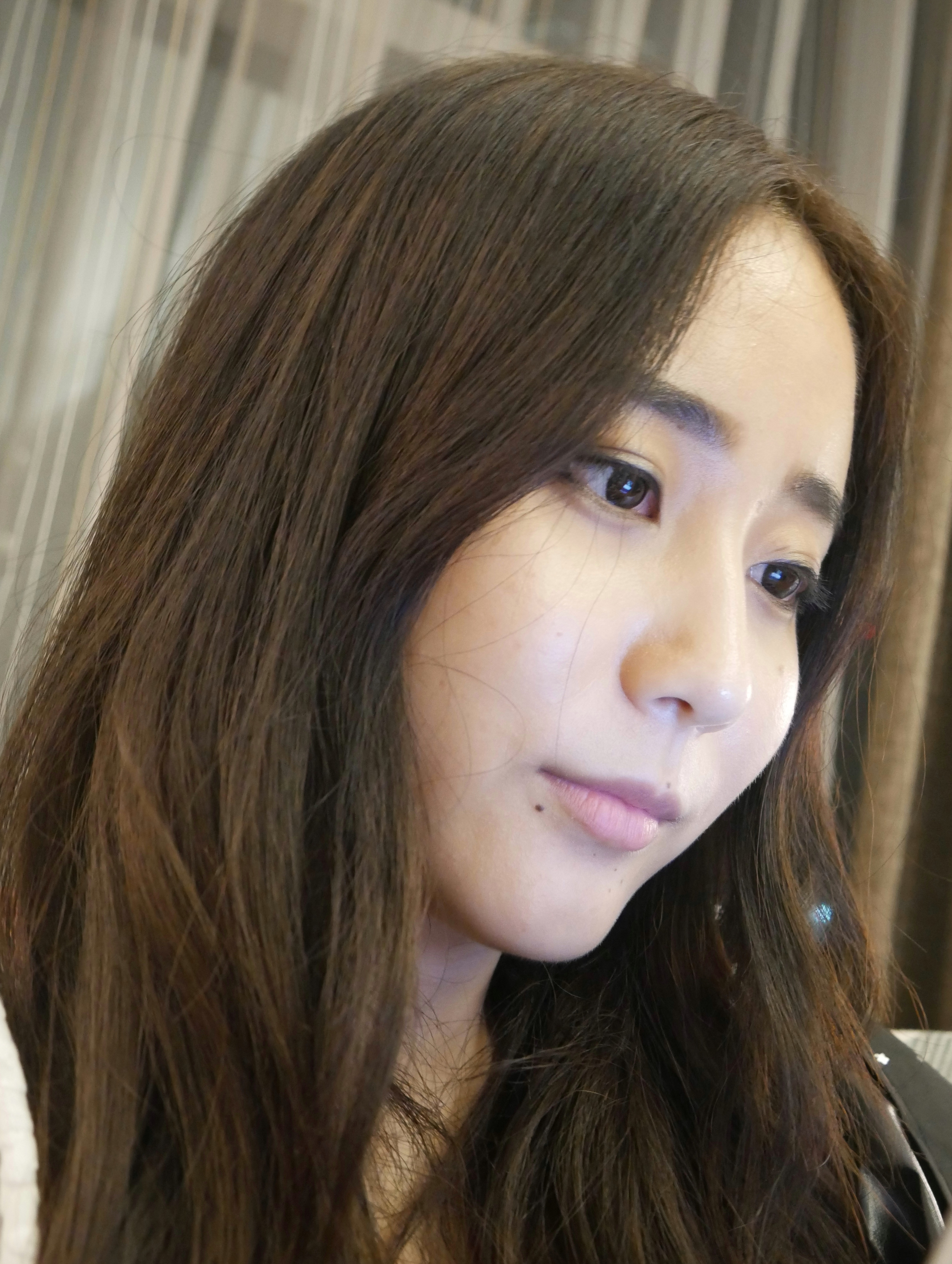
- Pinda Rika Dorji in 2017
- Born: Pinda Rika Dorji; November 7, 1993 (age 32); Thimphu, Bhutan
- Occupations: Gamer; Television host; YouTuber; Artist
- Years active: 2016–present
- Height: 5 ft 5.3 in (1.66 m)

Pinda Rika Dorji (born November 7, 1993), better known as pindaPanda, is a Bhutanese esports personality, YouTuber, and professional gamer. She has worked as a television host for Astro SuperSport's eGG Network.

== Early life ==
Dorji is from Changangkha, Thimphu. Her grandmother introduced her to video games when she was three years old, and they played Super Mario Bros. together on their NES. Later, she began playing online, despite the slow 3G connection in mountainous Bhutan.

Dorji first came to Kuala Lumpur, Malaysia, to pursue a degree in civil engineering. At the age of 21 in 2015, she graduated with from Infrastructure University Kuala Lumpur with a bachelor's degree in construction management in civil engineering.

== Career ==
Dorji is best known for playing Dota 2, which she has been playing since 2013. On her channel, Dorji also reviews the top competitions, does short cover versions of popular songs, dance routines, and tutorials for beginning players of Dota 2.

Dorji has her own lifestyle TV show called "The pindaPanda Show" on eGGNetwork.
