= Fox (gamer) =

Portuguese professional CS:GO player and former CS player

fox
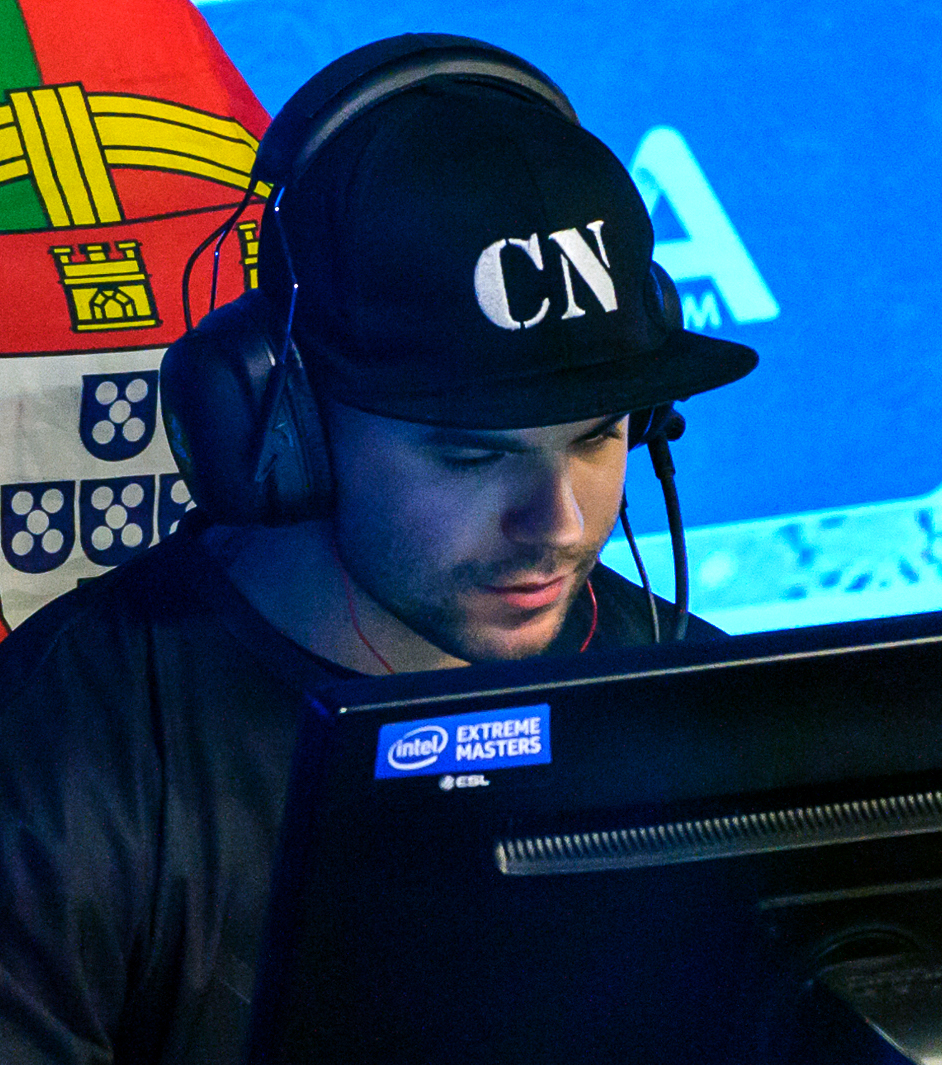
- Pacheco in 2015

Personal information
- Name: Ricardo Pacheco
- Born: 15 November 1986 (age 40); Guimarães, Portugal
- Nationality: Portuguese

Current team
- Team: Fourteen Esports
- Role: AWPer
- Game: Counter-Strike: Global Offensive

Career information
- Games: Counter-Strike; Counter-Strike: Global Offensive
- Playing career: 2006–present

Team history
- 2007–2015: k1ck eSports Club
- 2015: Team Kinguin
- 2015–2016: G2 Esports
- 2016: FaZe Clan
- 2016–2017: SK Gaming (stand-in)
- 2017: Team Dignitas
- 2017–2018: Team Kinguin
- 2018: Tempo Storm
- 2019: Giants Gaming
- 2021–present: Offset Esports

Ricardo Pacheco (born November 15, 1986), better known as fox, is a Portuguese professional Counter-Strike: Global Offensive player and former Counter-Strike 1.6 player.

== Career ==
Fox started his career in 2006 by playing Counter-Strike: 1.6 on Excello as an AWPer, he spent one year there and was signed in 2007 by the leading Portuguese eSports organization, k1ck eSports Club. Later on, in 2012, he switched his professional career to focus only CounterStrike: Global Offensive and signed with the Portuguese team, k1ck eSports Club with the most talented Portuguese players, winning the national championship and national cup.

His talent was noticed on some international teams in Europe, and in 2015 he signed with the French team G2 Esports, which was trying an international team with European players.

In 2016 he played as a stand-in for SK Gaming, the number 1 team in the world and placed 3rd-4th in the Major after falling to Virtus.pro in 2 overtimes.

On 4 January 2018 it was announced that fox will return to play with his ex-k1ck eSports Club teammate, MUTiRis, known as the second best Portuguese CS:GO player. Fox and MUTiRis, who departed the Spanish team, Giants, went to fox's first international team, Team Kinguin. After the things didn't go as planned at Team Kinguin, fox and MUTiRis left the organization, being the main cause the lack of good in-game communication between the five members. On 3 May 2018 it was announced fox would be joining a new international team, Tempo Storm.
