= Shiphtur =

Canadian professional esports player

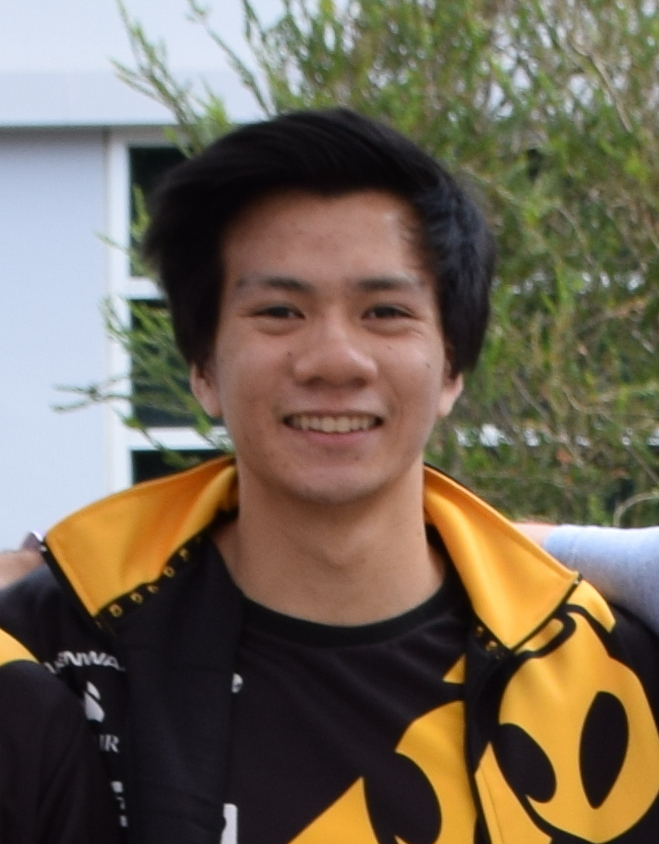
- Le in 2015

Personal information
- Name: Danny Le
- Nationality: Canadian

Career information
- Games: League of Legends
- Playing career: 2012–2018
- Role: Midlane

Team history
- 2012: Dirt Nap Gaming.Panda
- 2012: Monomaniac Evito
- 2012–2013: Team Dynamic
- 2013–2014: Team Coast
- 2014–2016: Dignitas
- 2016: Apex Gaming
- 2017: Delta Fox
- 2017–2018: Meme Stream Dream Team

Twitch information
- Channel: Shiphtur
- Years active: 2011–present
- Genre: Gaming
- Followers: 759 thousand
- Last updated: May 2, 2023

Danny Le, better known as Shiphtur (pronounced "shifter"), is a Canadian former professional League of Legends player. Shiphtur was the first esports player to be granted a P-1 athletic visa from the United States Department of State. On May 2, 2014, he joined Dignitas along with Darshan "ZionSpartan" Upadhyaya. On May 17, 2016, Apex Gaming acquired Dignitas' NA Challenger team including Shiphtur.

On September 26, 2016, Apex and Dignitas were acquired by the Philadelphia 76ers, and Shiphtur was released from the Apex Roster but not added to Dignitas.

== Tournament results ==
=== Team Apex ===
- 9th — 2016 NA LCS Summer regular season
- 5th–6th — 2016 NA LCS Summer playoffs
