= JJu =

South Korean esports player

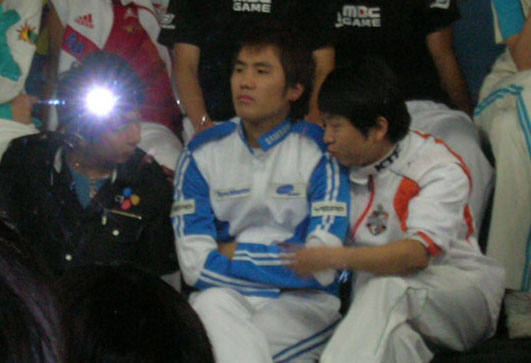

Personal information
- Name: Byun Eun-jong
- Nationality: South Korean

Career information
- Games: StarCraft

Korean name
- Hangul: 변은종
- RR: Byeon Eunjong
- MR: Pyŏn Ŭnjong

Eunjong "JJu" Byeon is a retired StarCraft pro gamer and poker player from South Korea.

Byun started his career at the STX Soul Team in 2002. He moved to the Samsung Khan Team in May 2005, where he acted as team leader. He and his team Khan won the championship for the Starcraft Pro-league 06-07 Season.

Currently retired, he is working his skill as a poker player.

== Accomplishments ==
- 2003 MBC TeamLeague Rookie Award
- 2004 Hangame Ongamenet Starleague 4th place
- 2004 Proleague 2nd Place
- 2005 Proleague 2nd Place
- 2005 Korea E-Sports Association League 1st Place (MVP)
- 2006 Proleague 1st Place
- 2006 Ongamenet StarLeague 4th Place
- 2006 MBC Starleague 3rd Place
- 2006 Ranked 3rd Place for All-time Progamer Ranking
- 2005~2007 Team Leader for Samsung Khan Progame Team
