= Lil Poison =

American professional esports player

Personal information
- Name: Victor De Leon III
- Born: May 6, 1998 (age 28)
- Nationality: American

Career information
- Games: Halo series

Victor De Leon III (born May 6, 1998), also known as Lil Poison, is a former professional Halo player. He is recognized by Guinness Book of World Records as the youngest professional video game player.

== Career ==
At age 5, De Leon entered the Major League Games for Halo and finished in the top 64 players internationally. At the age of six, De Leon became the youngest pro gamer after signing with Major League Gaming (MLG); however, MLG CEO Matthew Bromberg noted that De Leon was not technically a professional gamer, by the league's definition, as he was not a high enough rank and was not old enough. At the age of seven, he placed second, behind his uncle, at a Halo tournament in Chicago consisting of more than 550 contestants.

== Filmography ==
The HBO Latino Film Festival premiered Lil Poison, a documentary film filmed and directed by Beth Earl of Massive Productions. The film is about the life of De Leon and how he started and continues video gaming around the country.

== Personal life ==
De Leon was born on May 6, 1998. He began playing video games at two years old and was mentored by his father Victor DeLeon, Jr. and uncle Gabriel De Leon.
