= GodV =

Chinese professional League of Legends player

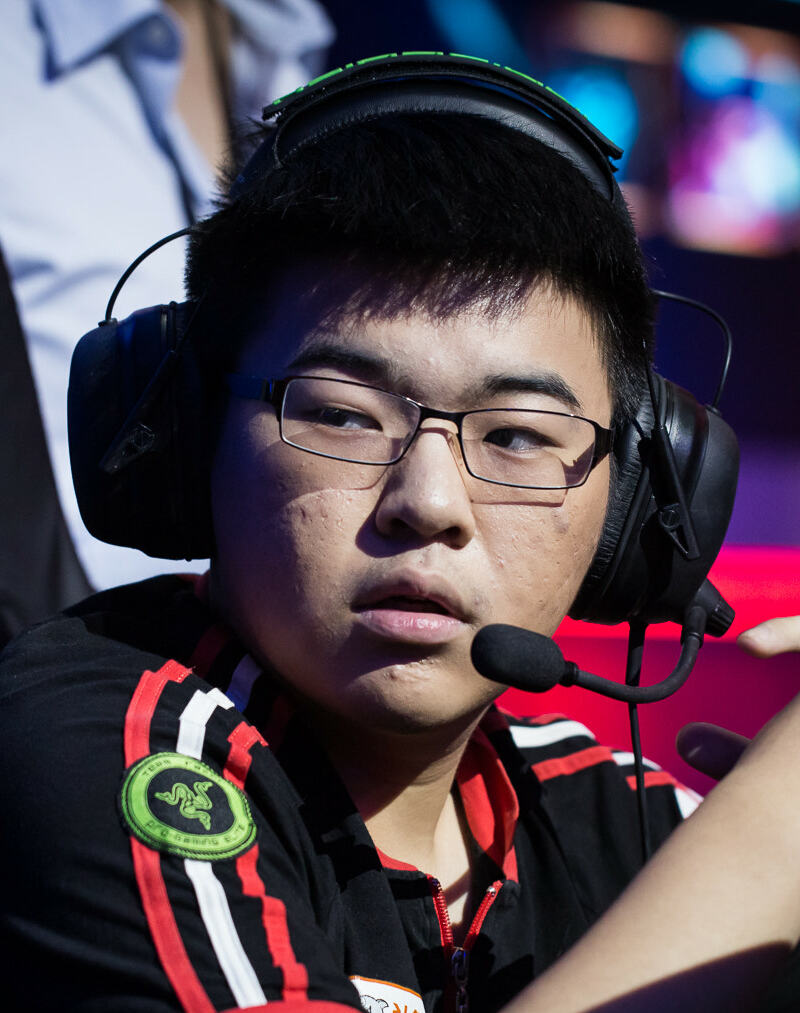
- Wei in 2015

Personal information
- Name: 韦朕 (Wei Zhen)
- Born: July 16, 1997 (age 29)
- Nationality: Chinese

Career information
- Games: League of Legends; PlayerUnknown's Battlegrounds
- Playing career: 2012–2017 (League of Legends); 2017–present (PUBG)
- Role: Mid laner (League of Legends)

Team history
- 2012–2014: Vici Gaming
- 2014–2017: LGD Gaming
- 2017–2022: Four Angry Men

Wei Zhen, better known by his in-game name GodV, (Note: Also known as We1less, PAinEvil, and LuciFer throughout his career.) is a retired Chinese professional League of Legends player who was previously the mid laner for LGD Gaming. While on LGD, GodV qualified for the 2015 World Championship after he and his team defeated the Qiao Gu Reapers 3–2 in the LPL finals. On June 8, 2020, Wei Zhen announced his marriage to Weng Jinxuan, also known by her online alias "Lil bee".

After his League of Legends career, Wei began his PlayerUnknown's Battlegrounds playing on team Four Angry Men and retired in 2022.

== League of Legends career ==
=== 2014 season ===
Wei joined LGD Gaming in May 2014 as their new mid laner under the name "We1less". He joined the team after leaving Vici Gaming, a team he was a part of since September 2012. LGD was knocked out extremely early in Demacia Cup Season 2, losing 2–1 to Team RM in the very first round. They placed fourth in the 2014 LPL Summer Regular Season and managed to qualify for the 2014 LPL Summer Playoffs. They failed to win a single game, losing 3–0 to both EDward Gaming and Star Horn Royal Club. LGD managed to make it to the 2014 Season China Regional Finals but were knocked out in the second round with a 2–1 loss to OMG.

=== 2015 season ===
LGD's first full tournament of the year was the 2015 Demacia Cup Spring Season where they made the quarterfinals but lost 3–0 to Invictus Gaming. Shortly afterwards, they finished the 2015 LPL Spring Regular Season in sixth place and advanced to the 2015 LPL Spring Playoffs. LGD upset both OMG and Snake eSports 3–0 to face EDward Gaming in the finals. The series went the distance to a full five games but LGD ultimately lost the series 3–2 to EDG.

Prior to the start of the second half of the season, We1less changed his name to "GODV". LGD became feared in China but they were upset 3–0 by OMG in the 2015 Demacia Cup Summer Season. LGD placed fifth in the 2015 LPL Summer Regular Season and qualified for the Seeding Match of the 2015 LPL Summer Playoffs. They fought their way to the finals, even upsetting EDG 3–0 along the way. LGD beat the Qiao Gu Reapers 3–2 in the finals to qualify for the 2015 World Championship as the top seed from China. LGD was placed in a group alongside Team SoloMid, Origen, and KT Rolster. They ended with a 2–4 record and were knocked out of the tournament.

=== 2016 season ===
Going into IEM X San Jose, GODV renamed once again, this time to PAinEvil. LGD were knocked out in the first round, losing 0–2 to Team SoloMid.

On May 10 Wei had to take a temporary leave from the game due to recurring hand injuries. After Wei's back in early August, although LGD's record has improved, due to too many early losses, he finally ranked fifth in Group B with a 7–9 regular season record and missed the playoffs. In the 2016 NEST National E-Sports Competition Finals, LGD lost to iG 0–2 and won the runner-up.

=== 2017 season ===
In the 2017 LPL Spring Split, LGD's poor condition ranked last in Group A in the regular season. According to LPL regulations, LGD needs to compete with LPL's sub-league LSPL to qualify for the relegation match. Godv helped LGD get 3 in the relegation match. -0 defeated GT, then defeated YM 3–0, successfully relegated.

== PlayerUnknown's Battlegrounds career ==
=== 2017 season ===
Godv transformed into a PlayerUnknown's Battlegrounds professional player and joined the Four Angry Men (4AM) team. In October 2017, Wei Zhen led 4AM in the Banana Project International Invitational and won the runner-up. In November 2017, 4AM won the runner-up in the G-Star PlayerUnknown's Battlegrounds Asia Invitational.

=== 2018 season ===
In February, 4AM won the first place in the SLI PlayerUnknown's Battlegrounds World Championship for two consecutive games and ranked eighth in total points. In June, 4AM won the championship in the TPP finals of the PCPI China Invitational.

=== 2019 season ===
In September 2019, 4AM won the PCL Summer Championship of FPP mode with a total of 241 points and 146 kills. In November 2019, 4am, ifty, qm, and vc four mainland teams played on behalf of the pcl region, went to participate in the PGC, which is the highest specification event in the official league of PUBG Esports, and won the third place with 99 points, next to geng and faze.

=== 2020 season ===
In October 2020, 4AM won the PCL Fall Championship of FPP mode with a total of 316 points with 103 placements and 169 kills.

=== 2021 season ===
In May 2021, 4AM won the PCL Spring Championship.

In July 2021, 4AM won TMC Global Invitational.

=== 2022 season ===
In December 2022, GodV left and retired.
