= Xian (disambiguation) =

Xi'an or Xian (西安) is the capital of Shaanxi province, China.

Xian or Xi'an may also refer to:

== Places ==
- Counties of China, known in Chinese as xiàn (县/縣)
- Xian (state) (弦), a minor state during the Zhou dynasty
- Xian County (献县/獻縣), a county in the Cangzhou prefecture, Hebei province, China
- Xi'an District, Mudanjiang (西安区), in Heilongjiang, China
- Xi'an District, Liaoyuan (西安区), formerly Xi'an County, in Jilin, China
- Xiān (暹), group of ancient political entities in Thailand.

== People ==
- Emperor Xian (disambiguation), posthumous name of several Chinese rulers
- Xian (surname) (咸; 冼), a Chinese surname
- Ashina Xian, a Western Turk khagan also appointed general by the Tang dynasty
- Bi Xian (802–864), official of the Chinese dynasty Tang dynasty
- Dong Xian (23 BC – 1 BC), Han dynasty politician
- Dou Xian (died 92 AD), Chinese general and consort kin of the Eastern Han dynasty
- Luo Xian (died 270), military general of the Jin dynasty of China
- Ruan Xian (fl. 3rd century), Chinese scholar who lived in the Six Dynasties period
- Sheng Xian (fl. 190s–200s), official who lived during the late Eastern Han dynasty
- Ho Kun Xian (mononymously known as Xian; born 1990), Singaporean video game player
- Xian Gaza (born 1993), Filipino internet personality and businessman
- Xian Lim (born 1989), Filipino-American actor, model, TV host and singer

== Other uses ==
- Xian (abbreviation), a form of the given name Christian
- Xi'an (comics), a Marvel Comics character
- Xian (Taoism) (仙), an immortal or enlightened person
- Xi'an (Aircraft Industrial Corporation), abbreviation for an aviation subsidiary (eg., Xian H-6)

== See also ==
- Du Xian (disambiguation)
- Li Xian (disambiguation)
- Liu Xian (disambiguation)
- Prince Xian (disambiguation)
- Wu Xian (disambiguation)
- Zhang Xian (disambiguation)
- Counties of the People's Republic of China (simplified Chinese: 县; traditional Chinese: 縣; pinyin: Xiàn), an administrative division in China
- County (Taiwan) (縣; Xiàn), an administrative division in Taiwan
