= Ham (surname) =

- Hangul: 함
- Hanja: 咸
- RR: Ham
- MR: Ham

Ham or Hahm is a Western and Korean surname.

In 2000 in South Korea, there were approximately 75,955 people with this surname. It is also used in North Korea. Although some sources claim there are as many as sixty Ham clans, only the Gangneung Ham clan (Korean: 강릉함씨) can be documented. Ham Gyu (Hanja: 咸規), a Goryeo general from the thirteenth century, is considered the founding ancestor of the Ham clan.

People with the surname include:

== Ham (Korean surname) ==
- Ham Chan-mi (born 1994), South Korean swimmer
- Ham Deok-ju (born 1995), South Korean professional baseball pitcher
- Ham Dong-hee, South Korean wheelchair curler
- Donhee Ham (born 1974), Gordon McKay Professor of Applied Physics and Electrical Engineering at Harvard University
- Ham Eun-ji (born 1997), South Korean weightlifter
- Ham Heung-chul (1930–2000), South Korean footballer
- Ham Hyun-gi (born 1962), South Korean footballer
- Ham Jang-sik (born 1994) South Korean retired professional League of Legends player and analyst known by the ID "Lustboy"
- Ham Jeung-im (born 1964), South Korean writer, professor, and former literary editor
- Ham Ji-hoon (born 1984) South Korean basketball player
- Ham Kee-yong (1930–2022), South Korean long-distance runner, winner of the 1950 Boston Marathon
- Han Da-min (born Ham Mi-na, 1983), South Korean actress
- Ham Pong-sil (born 1974), North Korean long-distance runner
- Ham Seok-heon (1901–1989), Korean Quaker author and activist
- Ham Tae-young (1873–1964), Korean politician, 3rd Vice president of First Republic of South Korea
- Ham Won-jin (born 2001), South Korean singer and child actor, member of the South Korean boy group Cravity
- Ham Seung-jin (born 1994), South Korean rapper, member of the K-pop boy group A-Jax

== Hahm (Korean surname) ==
- Hahm Eun-Jung (born 1988), South Korean singer and actress, member of the South Korean girl group T-ara
- Shinik Hahm (born 1958), Korean-American conductor

== Ham (Western surname) ==
- Arlene Ham (born 1936), American former politician in South Dakota
- Arthur Ham (1902–1992), Canadian histologist and tennis player
- Arthur Ham (golfer) (1891–1959), English golfer
- Bill Ham (1937–2016), American music impresario, best known as the manager, producer and image-maker for the blues-rock band ZZ Top
- Boris van der Ham (born 1973), Dutch writer, humanist, former politician and actor
- Darvin Ham (born 1973), American retired professional basketball player and current National Basketball Association assistant coach
- Ezequiel Ham (born 1994), Argentine footballer
- Greg Ham (1953–2012), Australian songwriter, actor and musician, member of the band Men at Work
- Jack Ham (born 1948), American retired National Football League player, member of the Pro Football Hall of Fame
- John Ham (disambiguation), also Hamm, several people
- Jon Hamm (born 1971), American actor, director and producer
- Ken Ham (born 1951), Australian-born Christian fundamentalist and young Earth creationist
- Kenneth Ham (born 1964), American retired astronaut and US Navy captain
- Marieke van den Ham (born 1983), Dutch water polo player
- Mary Katharine Ham (born 1980), American journalist and conservative commentator
- Mordecai Ham (1877–1961), American evangelist and temperance movement leader
- Paul Ham, Australian author, historian, journalist and publisher
- Pete Ham (1947–1975), Welsh singer, songwriter and guitarist, member of the rock band Badfinger
- Roswell G. Ham, American academic
- Tracy Ham (born 1965), American retired Canadian Football League quarterback

== Hahm (Western surname) ==
- Walther Hahm (1894–1951), German World War II general

== See also ==
- Xian (surname), Han Chinese version
- Hamm (surname), an English, German and Scottish surname
- List of Korean family names
- Korean name
