= Team Curse =

American esports organization (2011–2015)

- Divisions: League of Legends; Street Fighter; Super Smash Bros. Melee
- Founded: August 25, 2011
- Folded: January 6, 2015
- Location: Los Angeles, California
- Manager: Steve "LiQuiD112" Arhancet; Steve "Jokasteve" Perino
- Partners: Alienware; Cooler Master; G2A; HyperX; Loot Crate; Nissan
- Parent group: Curse, Inc.
- Website: www.teamcurse.net

Team Curse, also known as Curse eSports, was a North American esports organization sponsored by Curse, Inc. and based in Los Angeles. Formed as a League of Legends team in 2010 by Steve "LiQuiD112" Arhancet, it was acquired by Curse Inc. in August 2011, and the team renamed to Team Curse. On April 15, 2014, Arhancet announced that he had purchased the esports arm of the Curse Inc., which from then on was an organization entire separated from Curse, Inc., although they were still the title sponsor of the new Curse eSports brand.

On December 19, 2014, Curse, Inc. announced that it was dropping its title sponsorship of Curse eSports, after Riot Games introduced new League of Legends Championship Series (LCS) regulations regarding sponsoring more than one team. On January 6, 2015, the organization merged with Team Liquid. Team Liquid absorbed Curse eSports' League of Legends, Street Fighter, and Super Smash Bros. Melee rosters, the corresponding management staff, and Arhancet himself. Curse eSports had also previously fielded Call of Duty, Counter-Strike: Global Offensive, Guild Wars 2, Heroes of the Storm, Infinite Crisis, and Hearthstone teams.

== History ==
=== League of Legends ===
==== Team Curse ====
Team Curse
- Sport: League of Legends
- League: NA LCS
- Head Coach: Peter Zhang
- Established: August 25, 2010

On August 25, 2011, an unsigned League of Legends roster formally under unRestricted eSports was given a sponsorship by Curse Inc., and became Team Curse. The team's initial roster was Steve "LiQuiD112" Arhancet, Brandon "DontMashMe" Phan, Yiliang "Doublelift" Peng, Thomas "SYDTKO" Oh, Eugene "Pobelter" Park, Luis "Lapaka" Perez, Chenglong "Nyjacky" Wang, and Justin "Jsura" Nguyen. Two days after they were sponsored, Team Curse attended their first major event, MLG Raleigh 2011. After losing all of their group stage matches against Counter Logic Gaming, Epik Gamer, and Team SoloMid, the team finished the event in fourth place. They attended their second North American LAN, IGN Proleague 3 (IPL 3), in October 2011, where they fell to Team Dignitas in the first round.

Later that month, Team Curse was one of five American invitees to IEM VI New York, their first international event, where they were knocked out in the group stage, losing to SK Gaming among others, and on October 19, 2011, both Jsura and Lapaka decided to leave the team. Lapaka cited both professional and personal conflict with LiQuiD112 as his main reason for leaving. Alberto "Crumbzz" Rengifo was brought into the team that same day. On November 24, 2011, after the start of Riot Games' Season 2 Circuit, Doublelift left Team Curse to join North American rivals Counter Logic Gaming. Two days later, DontMashMe also left the team, once again citing Liquid112 as his main issue with the team. Despite the departure of some of their key players, Curse was still able to play in the second season of the National ESL Premier League, placing second behind Counter Logic Gaming.

Having been benched from Counter Logic Gaming, Cody "Elementz" Sigfusson joined Team Curse on December 19, 2011, while LiQuiD112 stepped down to a managing role. The next day, David "Cop" Roberson joined the team. Although March's IEM World Championship in Hanover was to prove the last event SYDTKO attended, his position on the team was still unclear as of an interview he gave on July 13, before his retirement from professional play some time afterwards. On May 19, 2012, Crumbzz left Curse and joined Team Dignitas, while Counter Logic Gaming's Brandon "Saintvicious" DiMarco joined Team Curse as Crumbzz' replacement. In June 2012, Curse picked up Jonathan "Westrice" Nguyen, as Pobelter was too young to move into the team's new gaming house. In August, Curse won MLG Raleigh 2012, beating Team Dignitas, but both teams were disqualified by for violating MLG's Official Pro Circuit Conduct Rules. No prize money or circuit points were awarded to either teams.

On August 20, 2012, Curse competed in the North American Regional Finals, but failed to qualify for the Riot Games Season 2 World Championship, placing fourth after losing to Counter Logic Gaming in the third place match. In September 2012, Westrice was benched from the team, and on November 1, Joedat "Voyboy" Esfahani was announced as his replacement. Additionally, for most of that month, the team played in several minor online events using Keenan "Rhux" Santos in place of Elementz. On November 21, LiQuiD112 announced that the team had benched Elementz in favor of Rhux, claiming that it would give them a "better opportunity" at IPL 5. Curse attended IPL 5 in late November. The team took third in their group, and were knocked to the losers bracket. Team Curse would be forced to eliminate Curse EU, before losing in the next round to reigning world champions Taipei Assassins.

Having failed to secure a top three placing at the North American Regional Finals, Team Curse did not automatically qualify for the newly created Riot Games NA League of Legends Championship Series (NA LCS), and were forced to attempt qualification through the Offline Qualifiers, with several of the team saying they would consider retirement should they failed to qualify. Team Curse progressed through each stage without losing a single game, and so secured a spot in the inaugural Spring Split of the NA LCS, beginning February 27, 2013. Team Curse ended the regular season in second place with a record of 19–9, behind Team SoloMid, and so secured a bye into the semifinals of the Spring Split Playoffs. Despite this, they lost both their semifinal match and the third place match, to Good Game University and Team Vulcun respectively, and so ended the season in fourth.

On April 20, 2013, Elementz announced that he had stepped down from the team, and on June 7, 2013, the organization announced that they had acquired former Gambit Gaming member Edward "Edward" Abgaryan to replace him. This move made Curse the first team to import a player from Europe to play in the NA LCS. Despite the move, Team Curse struggled in the Season 3 Summer Split, ending the regular season in fourth place with a record of 13–15. In the playoffs, the team would lose consecutive series to Team Dignitas and Counter Logic Gaming, and so would be forced to play in the Season 4 Spring Promotion tournament.

After the end to Season 3, the organization announced tryouts for all five positions on September 21, 2013. On October 7, the organization announced that Cop and Nyjacky would be moving to the newly formed Team LoLPro, being replaced by Zaqueri "Aphromoo" Black and Eugene "Pobelter" Park. Edward and Saintvicious also left the team, to be replaced by George "Zekent" Liu and Christian "IWDominate" Rivera. This new lineup was to last less than a week; Pobelter was released on October 13, 2013, over concerns regarding his age and availability, while Aphromoo was also released. The next day, it was announced that Diego "Quas" Ruiz and Cop had taken their spots. On December 22, 2013, this new Team Curse roster swept COGnitive Gaming to secure NA LCS requalification.

After the third week of the 2014 Spring Split, Zekent was replaced by Saintvicious, who was then in turn replaced by Michael "Bunny FuFuu" Kurylo after the seventh week. Team Curse finished the split in fifth place with a record of 11–17, before beating Team Dignitas in the playoffs to end the season in fourth place. On May 4, 2014, it was announced that Alex "Xpecial" Chu, previously of Team SoloMid, would replace BunnyFuFuu for the upcoming Summer Split. Team Curse finished fourth in both the regular season and playoffs, beating Counter Logic Gaming in the quarterfinals before losing to both Cloud9 and LMQ, disqualifying them once again from World Championship contention.

On September 17, 2014, Cop was released from Team Curse, and later joined Curse Academy. His replacement was announced on October 22, when Team Curse brought in former SK Telecom T1 K member Gwang-jin "Piglet" Chae to the team. On September 24 the team hired former LMQ head coach Peter Zhang, and on December 13, Curse announced that Jae-hun "FeniX" Kim would replace Voyboy for the 2015 season. On December 19, 2014, Curse Inc. announced that Team Curse would move forward without bearing the name "Curse" as a title sponsor, in order to allow the organization to continue promoting Curse Voice with other LCS teams while also complying with new LCS regulations regarding the sponsorship of more than one team. On January 6, 2015, Team Curse merged with Team Liquid, taking the latter's name; the League of Legends roster was included in the merger.

==== Curse EU ====
Curse EU
- Sport: League of Legends
- League: ECC
- Established: June 1, 2012
- Disbanded: January 25, 2013

On June 1, 2012, Team Curse purchased the Absolute Legends' League of Legends team, consisting of Vytautas "extinkt" Melinauskas, Algirdas "Sleper" Saliamonas, Tobias "Malunoo" Magnusson, Andreas "xinec" Krogsbøll, and Joey "YoungBuck" Steltenpool; also included in the deal was their manager Tomislav "Flyy" Mihailov. The team was branded as Curse EU. Curse EU's first event was the Reign of Gaming International Invitational, having qualified for the event under Absolute Legends. The team would lose all their group stage matches and the third place match, going out in last place on June 4. After the event, on June 13, Curse EU replaced player Youngbuck with Aurimas "Angush" Gedvilas. Six days later, after beating Fnatic and Millenium in their group at Dreamhack Summer 2012, Curse EU fell to Moscow Five in the semifinals, and placed third at the event after beating Fnatic once more in the third place match.

On August 16, 2012, Curse EU competed at the Season 2 European Regional Finals at Gamescom, where they lost to Fnatic in the quarterfinals, failing to secure a League of Legends World Championship seed. Sleper and xinec were kicked from the team on September 25, 2012, and were replaced by Jakub "Creaton" Grzegorzewski and Piotr "SuperAZE" Prokop. Having competed in the online group stages in late October, the team attended the Tales of the Lane offline finals on November 11, 2012, in Paris. Curse EU were to win the tournament, beating Moscow Five and Eclypsia in the final two rounds.

On November 27, days before IGN ProLeague 5 was due to begin, SuperAZE left the team, forcing them to use Jordan "Patoy" Blackburn of Team Dignitas as a substitute for the event. There, despite placing first in their group above North America's Team SoloMid, Curse EU lost their first two series in the knockout stage of the tournament to Counter Logic Gaming and sister team Team Curse, and so were eliminated in ninth-twelfth place. On December 9, Creaton and Angush left the team to join Eclypsia, and on December 12 the organization announced that Curse EU would be restructured in the coming month.

Some time before January 22, 2013, the team were rebranded as Team LoLPro, but remained under the Curse brand. LoL Pro is a League of Legends community site and part of the Curse Network. Competing at the Season 2 European Regional Finals had given the team a seed directly into the Offline Qualifiers for the inaugural season of the European League of Legends Championship Series (EU LCS), but only on the condition that three out of the five members who competed at the former event also competed at the latter. To satisfy this condition, Sleper was announced as rejoining the team on January 3, 2013. At some point before the qualifiers began on January 25, Titus "LeDuck" Hafner and Pavel "Mozilla" Klaban also joined the team. On January 25, 2013, ex-Curse EU, now Team LoLPro, took part in the EU LCS Offline Qualifiers in Poland. The team were quickly knocked out of the tournament after losing consecutive games to DragonBorns and Team Acer, and disbanded shortly afterwards.

==== Curse Academy ====
Curse Academy
- Sport: League of Legends
- League: NACS
- Established: January 24, 2013
- Disbanded: January 8, 2015

On January 24, 2013, Team Curse announced the formation of a League of Legends B-team, called Curse Academy. The announced roster was Keenan "Rhux" Santos, Christian "IWillDominate" Rivera, Eugene "Pobelter" Park, Johnny "Altec" Ru, and Orie "YoDa" Guo. In the first month after the team's inception, YoDa was replaced by David "Pixel" Zarinski This roster was not eligible to compete in the North American League of Legends Championship Series (NA LCS), given IWillDominate's then-ongoing ban, and Altec and Pobelter being ineligible due to their age.

In mid-March, despite their ineligibility, Curse Academy participated in an NA LCS Summer Promotion Qualifier at the 2013 MLG Winter Championship in Dallas. There, they failed to qualify after losing to Velocity eSports. After Pixel was replaced by Dylan "AtomicN" Newton later that month, the team attended the IPL Summer Promotion Qualifier in early April, taking second after losing to Quantic Gaming. Curse Academy's Promotion Tournament seed passed down to the next eligible team. On April 20, Rhux left the team to join Team Curse, and was replaced by Aaron "Swain Gretzky" Bean. Rhux rejoined the team on June 7. In late June, Curse Academy participated in an NA LCS Spring 2014 Promotion Qualifier at the 2013 MLG Spring Championship in Anaheim, failing to qualify after losing to FXOpen e-Sports.

On July 6, 2013, IWillDominate stepped down to become an analyst for the team, and was replaced by CloudTidus. However, CloudTidus was unable to travel to Gfinity London 2013 because of issues with his passport, and Don "Cpt Tran" Tran replaced him for the event. On July 17, the entire roster aside from Rhux was replaced, leaving Curse Academy as Rhux, Brad "OneBadBrad" Watson, Philip "Only Jaximus" Carter, Jovani "fabbbyyy" Guillen, and Tyler "Vibes" Selig. Vibes left the team the next day. On July 23, 2013, Maria "Yuno" Creveling acted as a substitute for Curse Academy against Exertus Zeal. She remained with the team until early August. Jason "Tsatsulow" Hawes filled the vacant spot on October 2, and IWillDominate moved to Team Curse five days later.

In the next two months Curse Academy would attempt to secure a seed for the NA LCS Season 4 Promotion Tournament, which the entire team were now eligible to compete in, taking part in the two final Promotion Qualifiers. In the first, on November 2, 2013, Curse Academy were knocked out by Napkins in Disguise in the last round, narrowly missing out on a seed. The team would be knocked out in the group stage of the second qualifier later that month, and so failed to qualify for the Promotion Tournament. On December 31, OneBadBrad announced that he had left Curse Academy, and on January 6, 2014, Tsatsulow was replaced by Nicolas "Gleebglarbu" Haddad, and Patrick "Titours" Lefort also joined. Gleebglarbu left the team to join Cloud9 Tempest two weeks later on January 21, and at some point before the end of the month Jamie "Sheep" Gallagher replaced him.

From February until the end of April, Curse Academy competed in the Spring Season of Riot Games' newly created North American Challenger Series (NACS), which had become the only route to secure promotion into the NA LCS. On February 1, 2014, after qualifying through an online group stage, the team were knocked out of the first half of the season after losing to Determined Gaming in the first round of the knockout stage. Only Jaximus announced that he had left Curse Academy on February 10, while fabbbyyy announced that he had been removed from the team the following day. The two were replaced by Julian "Duocek" LeGard and Brandon "DontMashMe" Phan that same day. Two weeks later, on February 25, 2014, Sheep left the team to join XDG Gaming, and was replaced by George "Zekent" Liu, who had been kicked from Team Curse.

In March 2014, having previously failed to place in the top four, Curse Academy were forced to requalify for the second half of the NACS Spring Season. The team managed this, and were matched against Cloud9 Tempest in the semifinals, where they lost. Zekent did not play in this match, and his position was filled by Keiwan "K1pro" Itakura. David "Diamond" Bérubé filled the same position in the team's win against vVv Gaming in the third place match on March 29, and Zekent announced his retirement from professional play four days later on April 2. Winning this match gave Curse Academy enough circuit points to qualify for the NACS Spring Playoffs, where K1pro again filled the vacant spot. The team lost to LMQ in the semifinals of the event, before falling to compLexity.Black in the third place match, narrowing missing out on a Summer Promotion Tournament seed.

On 4 May, Michael "Bunny FuFuu" Kurylo was removed from Team Curse's starting roster, and in his announcement post, LiQuiD112 claimed that he had given Bunny FuFuu the option of rebuilding Curse Academy's roster. Curse Academy used various substitute players for the next few events, but the team's full roster eventually stabilized as Cristian "Cris" Rosales, Brandon "Saintvicious" DiMarco, Zachary "mancloud" Allan Hoschar, Joshua "Impactful" Mabrey, and Bunny FuFuu. In June, the new 'rebuilt' Curse Academy competed in the first half of the NACS Summer Season. The team were beaten in the semifinals by Team Coast, before claiming third against Frank Fang Gaming on June 19. Lae-Young "Keane" Jang had joined the team from Team Curse OCE on June 16, but did not play in either match.

Keane was no more active in August, and did not take part in Curse Academy's matches in the second half of the NACS Summer Season. Despite being beaten by Team Coast in the finals, the team progressed to the NACS Summer Season Playoffs with a bye to the semifinals. Mancloud left Curse Academy on August 16, while Keane finally stepped up to the starting roster. Later that month, the team beat LoLPro in the semifinals of the Summer Playoffs, securing themselves a spot in the 2015 NA LCS Spring Promotion Tournament, before losing to Team 8 in the finals. Counter Logic Gaming picked Curse Academy as their opponent in the Promotion Tournament, and the two teams faced on September 9, 2014. Despite winning the first two games, Curse Academy would lose the next three, narrowly missing out on a spot in the Spring Split of the 2015 NA LCS.

On September 16, 2014, Riot Games released details of the upcoming Expansion Tournament, which would add two additional teams to the NA LCS, expanding it to a ten team league. Curse Academy were given an automatic seed into the tournament and a first round bye as a result of their participation in the Promotion Tournament. On September 24, Kevin "Hauntzer" Yarnell was announced as the team's newest member and Cris' replacement. Impactful also parted ways with the team at some point before September 28, when David "Cop" Roberson joined the team in his place. On December 12, 2014, after victories against compLexity.White and Team Coast, Curse Academy beat Team Fusion to secure entry into the 2015 Spring Split of the NA LCS On January 8, 2015, due to LCS rules regarding the ownership of two teams, it was announced that the Curse Academy roster and NA LCS spot had been sold to Gravity.

==== Team LoLPro ====
Team Curse
- Sport: League of Legends
- League: NACS
- Established: October 7, 2013
- Disbanded: December 2014

On October 7, 2013, Team Curse announced the formation of a second League of Legends B-team, called Team LoLPro, alongside changes to the main team's roster. LoL Pro is a League of Legends community site and part of the Curse Network. The team initially consisted of Chenglong "Nyjacky" Wang, David "Cop" Roberson, Cruz "Cruzerthebruzer" Odgen, and Brian "TrickZ" Ahn, with no fifth player announced. However, by October 14 Cop had moved back to the main League of Legends Championship Series team, and was briefly replaced by Jonathan "Demunlul" McCulloch, before he too left. On November 1, Cruzerthebruzer and TrickZ also left Team LoLPro, the latter to join Counter Logic Gaming, and the team's vacant spots were then filled by Kevin "Hauntzer" Yarnell, Simon "heavenTime" Jeon, Ben "LOD" deMunck, and Leon "Apexy" Tang. On December 6, Apexy was replaced by Derek "Lohpally" Abrams.

In January 2014, Team LoLPro attempted to join Riot Games' newly created North American Challenger Series (NACS), but failed to do so after being knocked out in the first round of the online qualifier. The team successfully qualified for the second half of the NACS Spring Season, but was eliminated in the quarterfinals by vVv Gaming on March 9. This loss meant Team LoLPro missed out on a seed into the Spring Playoffs, and Nyjacky was replaced by Devon "Hoodstomp" Mark two days later. In the first half of the NACS Summer Season, the team qualified once again, and progressed to the final before they were beaten by Team Coast at Wembley Arena on June 22. This second-place finish meant that Team LoLPro automatically qualified for the second half of the Summer Season. Neither Hoodstomp nor Lohpally played in the team's semifinal defeat against Curse Academy, and were instead replaced by Jordan "Patoy" Blackburn and Peter "Heartbeat" Lim. Hoodstomp announced his retirement that same day. The team was then beaten by Team 8 in the third-place-match on August 1, 2014, with Lohpally playing again in place of Heartbeat, giving Team LoLPro the third seed into the NACS Summer Playoffs.

At the Summer Playoffs, Team LoLPro played with Derek "Zignature" Shao in place of Lohpally, who had been moved to a substitute position. The team beat Denial eSports in the quarterfinals before losing to Curse Academy and Team Coast respectively in the semifinals and the third-place match on August 23. As a result, LoLPro did not qualify for the Spring Promotion Tournament, and on September 27, 2014, Curse eSports announced that it would be rebuilding Team LoLPro with new talent. On September 16, 2014, Riot Games released details of the upcoming Expansion Tournament, which would add two additional teams to the NA LCS, expanding it to a ten team league. The new Team LoLPro roster of Cuong "Flaresz" Ta, Thomas "Thinkcard" Slotkin, David "Yusui" Bloomquist, Apollo "WizFujiiN" Price, and Yuri "KEITHMCBRIEF" Jew qualified for the North American iteration of this tournament after finishing in fourth place on the League of Legends team ladder-rankings at the end of the qualifying period. The team lost to Team Coast in the second round of the online stage on November 23, 2014, and disbanded shortly afterwards.

== Final roster ==
As of the merger between Team Curse and Team Liquid on January 6, 2015.

=== League of Legends ===
Alias	Full Name
Quas	Diego Ruiz
IWDominate	Christian Rivera
FeniX	Jae-hun Kim
Piglet	Gwang-jin Chae
Xpecial	Alex Chu

=== Super Smash Bros. Melee ===
Alias	Full Name
Hungrybox	Juan Debiedma
Chillindude	Kashan Khan

=== Street Fighter ===
Alias	Full Name
NuckleDu	Du Dang

== Notable alumni ==
- Yiliang "Doublelift" Peng (League of Legends)
- Steve "LiQuiD112" Arhancet (League of Legends)
- Aleksi "allu" Jalli (Counter-Strike: Global Offensive)
- Dillon "Attach" Price (Call of Duty)
- Kevin "Hauntzer" Yarnell (League of Legends)
