= Si (surname 斯) =

Chinese family name

Si (斯) is a Chinese surname that is now mainly distributed in Zhuji, China.

According to historical records, it comes from Shǐ, which was given to Shi Wei by Sun Quan.

It is used in Korean as the Baekje surname Sa.

It is listed as one of the Eight surnames of Zhurong.

== Notable people ==
- Si Jiahui (斯佳辉; born 2002), Chinese snooker player
- Si Xia
- Si Xingjian (斯行健; 1901–1964), Chinese paleobotanist and stratigrapher
- Si Xinliang (斯鑫良; born 1950), Chinese politician

== See also ==
- Si (surname)
