= SSU =

SSU may refer to:

== Universities ==
- Sacramento State University, California
- Salem State University, Massachusetts
- Salisbury State University, Maryland
- Samar State University, Philippines
- Saratov State University, Russia
- Savannah State University, Georgia
- Shawnee State University, Ohio
- Sonoma State University, California
- Soongsil University, South Korea
- Southampton Solent University, England
- Southern States University, California
- Sri Sai University, India

== Science and technology ==
- Second, Saybolt universal, a standardised measure of kinematic viscosity
- Small-subunit ribosomal RNA, as in the SSU rDNA gene or SSU rRNA product (prokaryotic 16S ribosomal RNA, mitochondrial 12S ribosomal RNA, eukaryotic 18S ribosomal RNA)
- Synchronization Supply Unit, to reduce synchronization problems in digital telecommunications

== Security ==
- Sanitary Squad Unit, a unit in the United States Army Ambulance Service during World War I
- Security Service of Ukraine, the main Ukrainian internal security agency
- Special Security Unit, a specialized unit of the Sindh Police for performing security and counterterrorism functions
- Strategic Services Unit, a US intelligence organization of the 1940s
- Special Support Unit, was the police tactical unit of the Royal Ulster Constabulary active during The Troubles. Formed as a replacement to the Special Patrol Group in 1981 and a predecessor of the Headquarters Mobile Support Unit

== Other uses ==
- Sandiaga Salahuddin Uno, an Indonesian businessman and politician
- Sony's Spider-Man Universe
- Southern Sporting Union, an Indian football club in Imphal, Manipur
- Sudan Socialist Union
- Swedish Social Democratic Youth League (Swedish Sveriges Socialdemokratiska Ungdomsförbund)
- Si (surname), Chinese surname, romanized as Ssu in Wade–Giles.
