= Lustboy =

South Korean former professional gamer

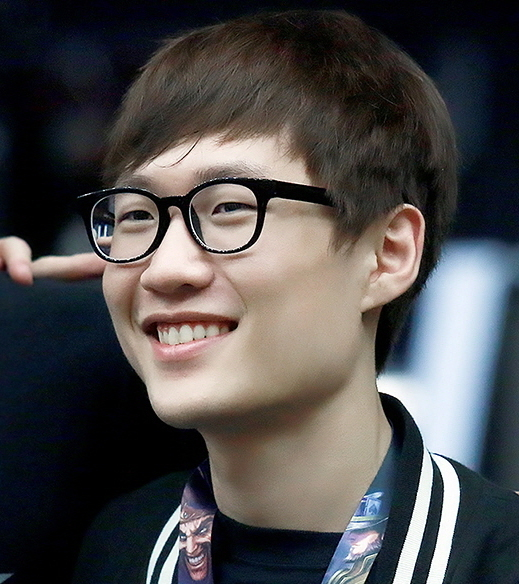
- Lustboy in 2014

Personal information
- Name: 함장식 (Ham Jang-sik)
- Nationality: South Korean

Current team
- Team: Retired
- Role: Coach
- Game: League of Legends
- League: LCS

Career information
- Playing career: 2011–2015
- Role: Support
- Coaching career: 2016–2021

Team history

As player:
- 2011–2012: MiG Blaze
- 2012–2013: Azubu Blaze
- 2013–2014: CJ Entus Blaze
- 2014–2015: Team SoloMid

As coach:
- 2016: Longzhu Gaming
- 2018–2020: Team SoloMid
- 2021–present: 100 Thieves

Career highlights and awards
- 3× NA LCS champion

Ham Jang-sik (Korean: 함장식), better known as Lustboy, is a South Korean League of Legends coach and retired professional player. After retiring from professional competition, Lustboy became a coach for Longzhu Gaming of the League of Legends Champions Korea (LCK), before leaving to coach for LCS team Team SoloMid. He joined 100 Thieves as the Support Coach in December 2020, but retired from the League of Legends scene at the end of 2021. He currently streams Lost Ark (video game) full time on Twitch (service).

Lustboy first played for Korean team MiG Blaze through their transition though CJ Entus Blaze and CJ Entus from 2011 to 2014, then played for Team SoloMid from 2014 to 2015. He retired from professional play following an injury. During his tenure on Team SoloMid as a support player, Lustboy won the 2014 Summer and 2015 Spring NA LCS.

== Playing career ==
Lustboy started gaming at the age of 7 with the first installment of the StarCraft (SC1) franchise from Blizzard Entertainment. However, this was well after the game became competitively popular in South Korea. As he phrased it:

"I really like to make innovation...I like trying new things no one's ever tried before. But [Blizzard] already made SC1 a long time ago so there [wasn't much for me to do]."

He later turned semi-pro playing StarCraft II, joining the Korean Team Prime as a substitute in 2010.

=== MiG Blaze ===
The next year he began playing League of Legends with a number of soon-to-be professionals. One of these, Dong-jin "Helios" Shin, would later sign as an AD carry with Maximum Impact Gaming (MiG) Blaze, and then bring on Lustboy as support when the position became vacant. As part of MiG Blaze, Lustboy took first place at the first OnGameNet tournament at Champions Spring 2012, winning the largest prize pool in League of Legends history up to that point.

That same year, they became the first Korean team to compete professionally in North America at Major League Gaming's first arena tournament, winning the competition with 10 wins and one loss.

MiG was acquired in 2013 by CJ Entus, and the now newly dubbed CJ Entus Blaze, went on to place first in the World Cyber Games 2013 Korean qualifiers. Lustboy left Blaze in 2014.

=== Team SoloMid ===
Lustboy joined Team SoloMid (TSM) of the North American League of Legends Championship Series (NA LCS) in July 2014, replacing former support, Gleeb. Lustboy described TSM as "like a dream team". Prior to the official announcement, TSM owner Andy Dinh was fined $2,000 for announcing the acquisition of Lustboy before receiving League approval for the transfer.

Along with Lustboy, TSM finished as the top North American team of 2014, with Lustboy ending with a 2.73 KDA. In the world championship that year, they were eliminated in the quarter-finals to future world champs Samsung White, but were the first team to take a game off them which was matched by Star Horn Royal Club in the finals. 2015 Worlds was no better as they placed 4th in Group D, following their disappointing performance at the world championship TSM announced that Lustboy was retiring as a player for the team.

Described as "arguably the best support in the NA LCS," at the time he ranked fifth among North American supports in KDA at 3.65, and fourth in gold-per-minute at 227. He continued as a streamer for TSM, and as an analyst for the team where he was centrally involved in the process of creating a new roster following the simultaneous departure of teammates Lucas ‘Santorin’ Larsen and Marcus 'Dyrus' Hill. He left the team on July 11 and was replaced as support by YellowStar. In TSM's official announcement, Lustboy is quoted as saying:

"Due to shoulder injuries and being tired of playing, I decided to step down as a player but I’ll still be involved with TSM helping in anyway possible. I will never forget how much fans and everyone treated me kindly, and I appreciate the opportunity given to me by TSM to prove my skills even though I was a foreigner." (Note: In the same announcement, coach Yoonsup "Locodoco" Choi is quoting saying the following: “Lustboy joined TSM at a critical time, when we were left without a support due to unforeseen circumstances. He was rushed to join the team and was a crucial part of our 1st place finish in summer split 2014. He’s been a pleasure to work with in and out of game and I hope he can continue his success for the rest of his future endeavors”)

== Coaching career ==
=== Longzhu Gaming ===
In 2015 Lustboy joined Longzhu Gaming of the League of Legends Champions Korea as a strategic coach.

=== Team SoloMid ===
In December 2017, Team SoloMid announced that Lustboy would be returning as a "strategy coach" for 2018, working with fellow coaches Parth Nadu and SSONG (Sang-soo Kim).

=== 100 Thieves ===
Ham was signed as a support role coach for 100 Thieves ahead of the 2021 LCS season.

== Tournament results ==
=== MiG Blaze/CJ Entus Blaze ===
==== 2012 ====
- 1st — Azubu The Champions
- 1st — Major League Gaming Summer Arena
- 4th — Azubu The Champions Summer 2012
- 2nd — Season Two Regional Finals - Seoul
- 1st — 2012 MLG Fall Championship

==== 2013 ====
- 2nd — IEM Season VII - Global Challenge Katowice
- 4th — OLYMPUS Champions Winter 2012-2013
- 4th — OGN Club Masters
- 1st — IEM Season VII - World Championship
- 2nd — OLYMPUS Champions Spring 2013
- 1st — 2013 World Cyber Games Korean qualifiers

==== 2014 ====
- 1st — 2013-14 ZOTAC NLB Winter 2013–2014
- 4th - HOT6iX Champions Spring 2014

=== CJ Entus ===
==== 2014 ====
- 3rd — SK Telecom LTE-A LoL Masters 2014

=== Team SoloMid ===
==== 2014 ====
- 1st — 2014 Summer NA LCS playoffs
- Semifinalist — IEM Season IX San Jose
- Quarterfinalist — 2014 League of Legends World Championship

==== 2015 ====
- 1st — IEM Season IX - World Championship
- 1st — 2015 Spring NA LCS playoffsa
- 2nd — 2015 Summer NA LCS Playoffs
- Semifinalist — 2015 League of Legends World Championship
- Semifinalist — IEM Season X San Jose (analyst)

=== Longzhu Gaming ===
==== 2016 ====
- 7th — 2016 Spring LCK (coach)
- 8th — 2016 Summer LCK (coach)
