= Xian (surname) =

Chinese family name

Xian (咸)
- Pronunciation: Xián
- Language: Chinese

Origin
- Language: Old Chinese
- Derivation: Gaoxin (高辛)
- Meaning: Salty

Other names
- Variant forms: Xhan, Shan, Shen
- Cognates: Zi (surname); Wu (surname); Si (surname); Mi (surname); Ji (surname)
- Derivatives: Haam, Ham, Hahm the Cantonese
- See also: Wu Xian (astronomer)

Xian (Chinese: 咸) is a Chinese surname. Its romanizations in Cantonese and Old Chinese are Haam and Ham or Hahm respectively.

It could refer to the surname 冼 which was chosen to replace the rare character surname Shan which cannot be displayed on a computer with normal coding. Two hundred people from Gaozhuang Village in Mudan District, Heze, Shandong were affected although people who already registered with their original name were allowed to keep it.

== Origin ==
- Di Ku (帝嚳) the Gaoxin (高辛)'s posterity got the surname Xian (咸).
- During the Shang dynasty, Astronomer Wu Xian (巫咸) got the surname Wu with given name of Xian (咸).
- During the Emperor Yao, the Si (姒) family got surname Xian (咸).
- In territory of Chu (state), the Mi (芈) family got surname Xian (咸).
- During the Zhou dynasty in Jin (晋), the Ji (姬) family got the surname Xian (咸).
- During the Han dynasty, Hui people (回) got the surname Xian (咸).
- During the Qing dynasty in Liaoning, Khitan (契丹) got the surname Xian (咸).
- Various Chinese Minorityies use surname Xian (咸).

== Notable people ==
- Lady Xian (512–602), noblewoman of the Li people born to the chieftain of the Xian tribe in Southern China
- Ah Xian (born 1960), Chinese-Australian artist
- He Zi Xian (born 1976), Chinese Grand Prix motorcycle racer
- Jia Xian, Chinese mathematician from Kaifeng of the Song dynasty
- Old Xian, artist based in Hangzhou, China
- Wang Xian (sport shooter) (born 1978), Chinese Olympic sport shooter
- Sim Woh Kum (1933–1973), Singaporean convicted murderer

=== Hsien ===
- Lee Hsien Yang
- Lee Hsien Loong
- Hou Hsiao-hsien
- Hsien Chung Wang

== See also ==
- Ham (surname), Korean version
- Xian (disambiguation), including other people with the name Xian
- Hui people
- Khitan people
- Mandarin Chinese
- Chinese Minority
- Xianyang, city in Shaanxi
