= Quas =

Venezuelan League of Legends player

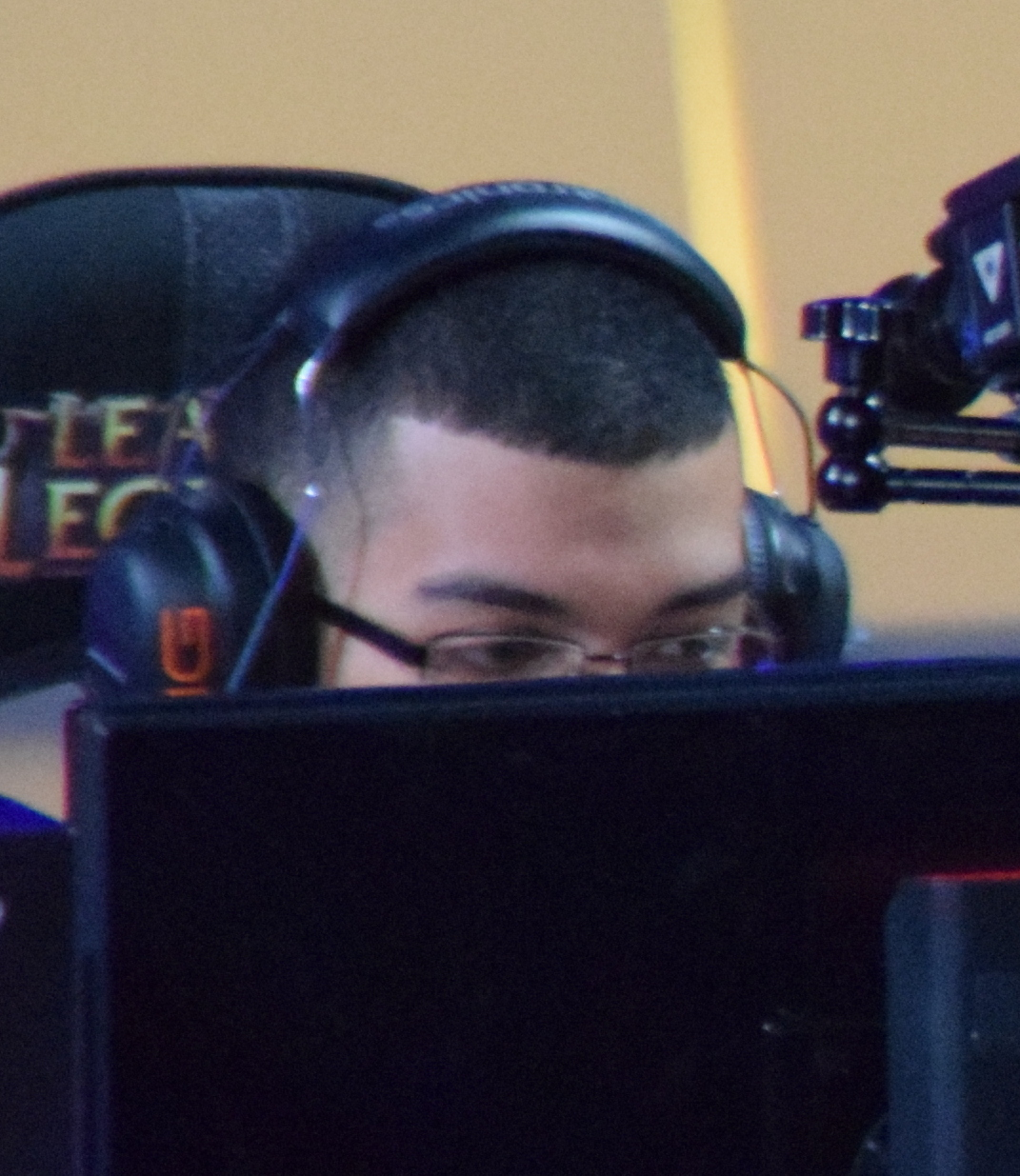
- Ruiz in 2015

Personal information
- Name: Diego Ruiz
- Born: 1991 or 1992 (age 34–35)
- Nationality: Venezuelan, American

Current team
- Team: Bay State College
- Role: Top laner
- Game: League of Legends

Career information
- Playing career: 2013–2017, 2020–present

Team history
- 2013: New World Eclipse
- 2013: Gold Gaming LA
- 2014: Team Curse
- 2015: Team Liquid
- 2016: NRG Esports
- 2017: Tempo Storm
- 2020–present: Bay State College

Diego Ruiz, better known as Quas, is a Venezuelan League of Legends player who plays top lane for Bay State College. He previously played for Team Liquid, Team Curse, NRG Esports, and Tempo Storm.

== Career ==
Ruiz dropped out of engineering school to focus on boosting accounts for money and coaching new players, and in 2013 moved to Los Angeles to take a job with New World Eclipse. He played for them in the top lane from May 2013 to September 2013. On September 14, Quas joined the reformed Gold Gaming LA, taking the position of top laner with KOR Kez as jungle, Bischu in the mid lane, otter as AD Carry, and NydusHerMain as support. He played with them up until October 14 when he left to take the position of solo laner for Team Curse, to play in the top lane while occasionally switching with Voyboy to play mid.

=== Team Liquid ===
Prior to the start of the 2014 NA LCS Spring Split, Team Curse merged with the Team Liquid organization and rebranded under the name Team Liquid. After a few swaps between Keith and Piglet as their AD carry, the team ended the season with a 9–9 record and qualified for playoffs with the sixth seed after defeating Team 8 in a tiebreaker game. During the split, Quas showcased his deep champion pool, with 13 different picks and wins on 9 of them. In the playoffs, Liquid beat CLG 3–0 in the quarterfinals before falling to Cloud9 3–2 in the semifinals; in the third-place match, Liquid finally broke the "fourth-place curse" that stopped them from placing higher than fourth place in any event that had persisted since they were Team Curse and took down Team Impulse 3–2.

Team Liquid finished the 2014 NA LCS Summer Split round robin in first place after winning a tiebreaker match over Counter Logic Gaming—the first team other than TSM or Cloud9 to place first in an NA LCS round robin. However, in the playoffs, they lost immediately in the semifinals to TSM, making them also the first team to finish first in an NA LCS round robin but not make the playoff finals. A CLG victory over TSM in the playoff finals sent Team Liquid to the regional finals instead of giving them a direct seed to Worlds via Championship Points, and in the gauntlet they lost to underdogs Cloud9, ending their post-season abruptly.

On November 29, 2015, Quas was suspended from Team Liquid in a decision made by team management. Shortly afterwards he announced his retirement from competitive League of Legends. He said he was planning on starting college.

=== NRG Esports ===
Quas un-retired in April 2016 and was picked up by NRG Esports in their LCS debut as their top laner. He and the team finished the 2016 NA LCS Summer Split with a 4–14 record and were eventually relegated.

=== Tempo Storm ===
Ruiz was signed by Tempo Storm ahead of the 2017 NA CS season. In November 2017, Ruiz again announced his retirement.

=== Bay State College ===
In 2020, Ruiz enrolled at Bay State College, joining the college's League of Legends team. He and the team competed in Risen Champions League, a tier-two tournament, where they team finished in ninth place.

== Tournament results ==
=== Team Liquid ===
- 2nd — 2015 Season North America Regional Finals
- 3rd — 2015 NA LCS Summer Playoffs
- 3rd — 2015 NA LCS Spring Playoffs

=== NRG Esports ===
- 5th — 2016 Spring NA LCS
- 5-6th — 2016 Spring NA LCS Playoffs
- 9th — 2016 NA LCS Summer regular season
- lost — 2017 Spring NA LCS promotion
