= Xpecial =

American professional gamer (born 1992)

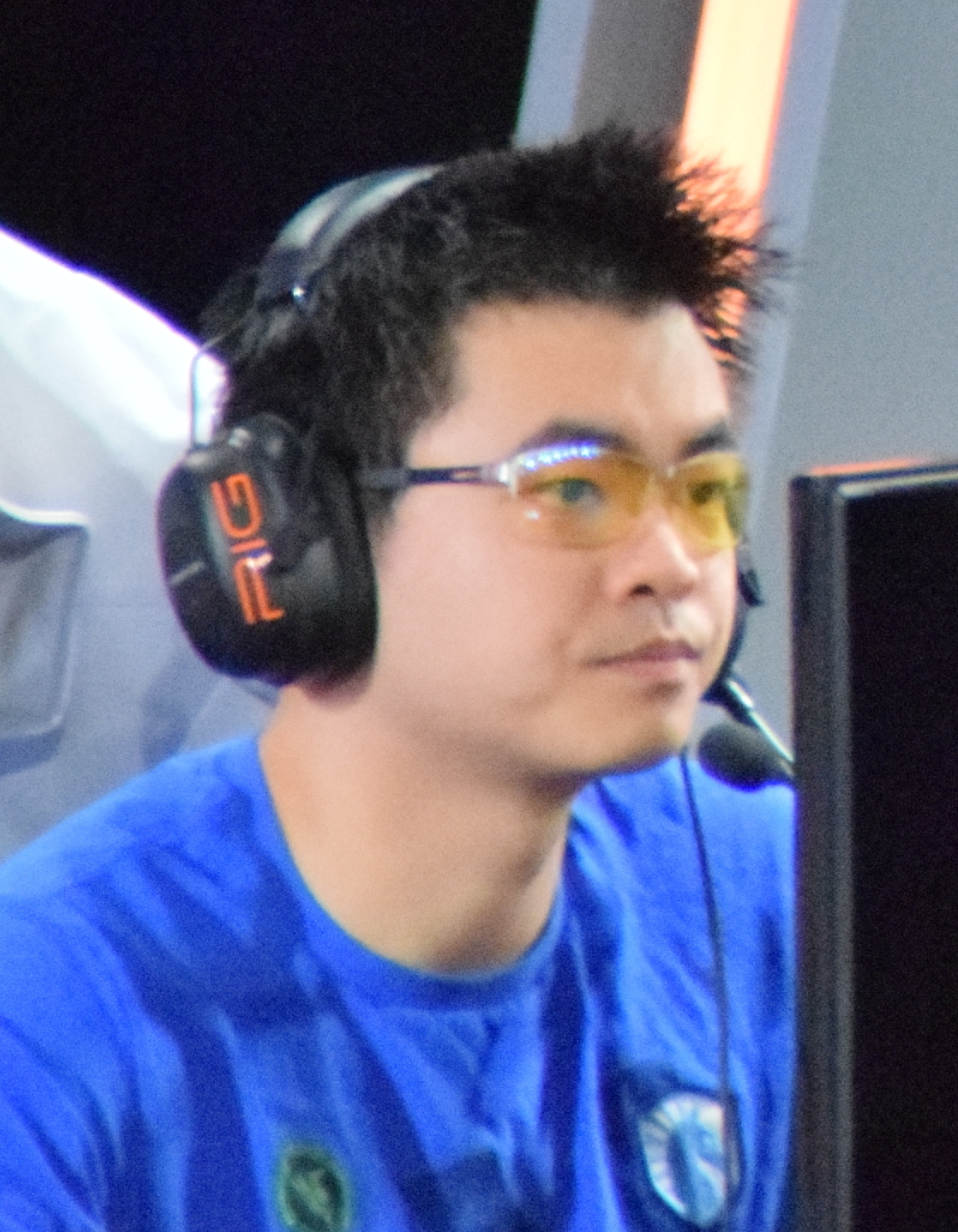
- Chu in 2015

Personal information
- Name: Alex Chu
- Born: 1991 or 1992 (age 34–35); Temple City, California, United States
- Nationality: American

Current team
- Team: Harrisburg University
- Role: Coach
- Game: League of Legends

Career information
- Playing career: 2011–2018
- Role: Support
- Coaching career: 2018–present

Team history

As player:
- 2011–2014: Team SoloMid
- 2014: Team Curse
- 2015: Team Liquid
- 2016: Apex Gaming
- 2017: Team Dignitas
- 2018: Phoenix1
- 2018: GGS Academy

As coach:
- 2018: Golden Guardians
- 2019–2022: Harrisburg University

Alex Chu (born August 12, 1992), better known by his in-game name Xpecial, is an American League of Legends player who was the head coach for Harrisburg University. He previously played for several teams, including Phoenix1, Team Dignitas, Team Liquid and Team SoloMid.

== Playing career ==
=== 2013–2014 ===
In May 2013, during Season 3, Xpecial was selected to join the North American All-Star team in Shanghai, along with Scarra, Doublelift, Saintvicious, and teammate Dyrus. Along with Doublelift, Xpecial received second place in the Bottom Lane Skill Competition, losing in the finals to Pray and MadLife of Korea. In the main event, the North American team finished in the top four by winning against Europe 2–0 and losing to both China and Korea 0–2.

On March 23, 2014, Xpecial was awarded the Week 9 MVP for having the highest KDA of the week, 11.5, in two games against Dignitas and XDG Gaming. This was his first Week MVP award and the fifth for Team SoloMid.

On April 27, 2014, Xpecial announced on his stream that he was being benched from Team SoloMid's main roster.

On May 4, Xpecial announced that he had been released by Team SoloMid and was joining Team Curse. The details surrounding the quick benching and subsequent release were unknown for some time, with neither party divulging any details until Xpecial announced via his stream that the release had not been performance related but rather due to his "passive-aggressive attitude". Months later, Xpecial retracted his statement, saying that he did not consider himself to be passive-aggressive but instead trying to be critical without being rude.

=== 2015 ===
Prior to the start of the spring LCS split, Team Curse merged with the Team Liquid organization and rebranded under the name Team Liquid. After a few swaps between Keith and Piglet as their AD carry, the team ended the season with a 9–9 record and qualified for playoffs with the sixth seed after defeating Team 8 in a tiebreaker game. In the playoffs, Liquid beat CLG 3-0 in the quarterfinals before falling to Cloud9 3-2 in the semifinals; in the third-place match, Liquid finally broke the "fourth-place curse" that stopped them from placing higher than fourth place in any event that had persisted since they were Team Curse and took down Team Impulse 3-2.

Team Liquid finished the summer split round robin in first place after winning a tiebreaker match over Counter Logic Gaming – the first team other than TSM or Cloud9 to place first in an NA LCS round robin. However, in the playoffs, they lost immediately in the semifinals to TSM, making them also the first team to finish first in an NA LCS round robin but not make the playoff finals. A CLG victory over TSM in the playoff finals sent Team Liquid to the regional finals instead of giving them a direct seed to Worlds via Championship Points, and in the gauntlet they lost to underdogs Cloud9, ending their post-season abruptly.

In September 2015, Xpecial released a vlog confirming that he would be leaving Team Liquid. His replacement Smoothie was announced a few weeks later, and shortly after Xpecial became a free agent. In his free agency announcement, he stated that he had played briefly with Cloud9's new Challenger team but that it hadn't worked out.

Xpecial confirmed the benching of himself from Team Liquid on the September 26, 2015.

=== 2016 ===
Xpecial joined NA Challenger Series team Apex Gaming, and the team won the 2016 Spring NA CS.

On September 27, 2016 Apex Gaming and Team Dignitas were acquired by the Philadelphia 76ers, and players were transferred to the Dignitas team.

== Coaching career ==
Chu began his coaching career as a coach for Golden Guardians in the 2018 NA LCS Summer Split. In June 2019, Chu joined Harrisburg University full-time as the university's varsity League of Legends coach, parting ways with the university in July 2022.

== Tournament results ==
=== Team Solomid ===
- 2nd — 2012 IEM VI - Kiev
- 1st — 2012 IGN Pro League Season 4
- 1st — 2012 Reign of Gaming International Invitational
- 1st — 2012 MLG Spring Championship 2012
- 1st — 2012 GIGABYTE ESPORTS LAN Invitational
- 1st — 2012 IPL Face Off: San Francisco Showdown
- 1st — 2012 Season 2 Regional Finals - Seattle
- 5th–8th — 2012 LoL Season 2 World Championship
- 9th–12th — 2012 IGN Pro League Season 5
- 1st — 2013 NA LCS Season 3 Spring Playoffs
- 2nd — 2013 NA LCS Season 3 Summer Playoffs
- 11th–12th — 2013 LoL Season 3 World Championship
- 1st — 2013 Battle of the Atlantic
- 2nd — 2014 NA LCS Season 4 Spring Playoffs
- 4th — 2014 Riot NA LCS Season 4 Summer Playoffs

=== Team Liquid ===
- 6th — 2015 League of Legends Championship Series Spring season
- 3rd — 2015 League of Legends Championship Series Spring playoffs

=== Apex Gaming ===
- 1st — 2016 Spring NA CS
- 6th — 2016 NA LCS Summer regular season
- 5th–6th — 2016 NA LCS Summer playoffs
