= Rush (gamer) =

South Korean professional League of Legends player

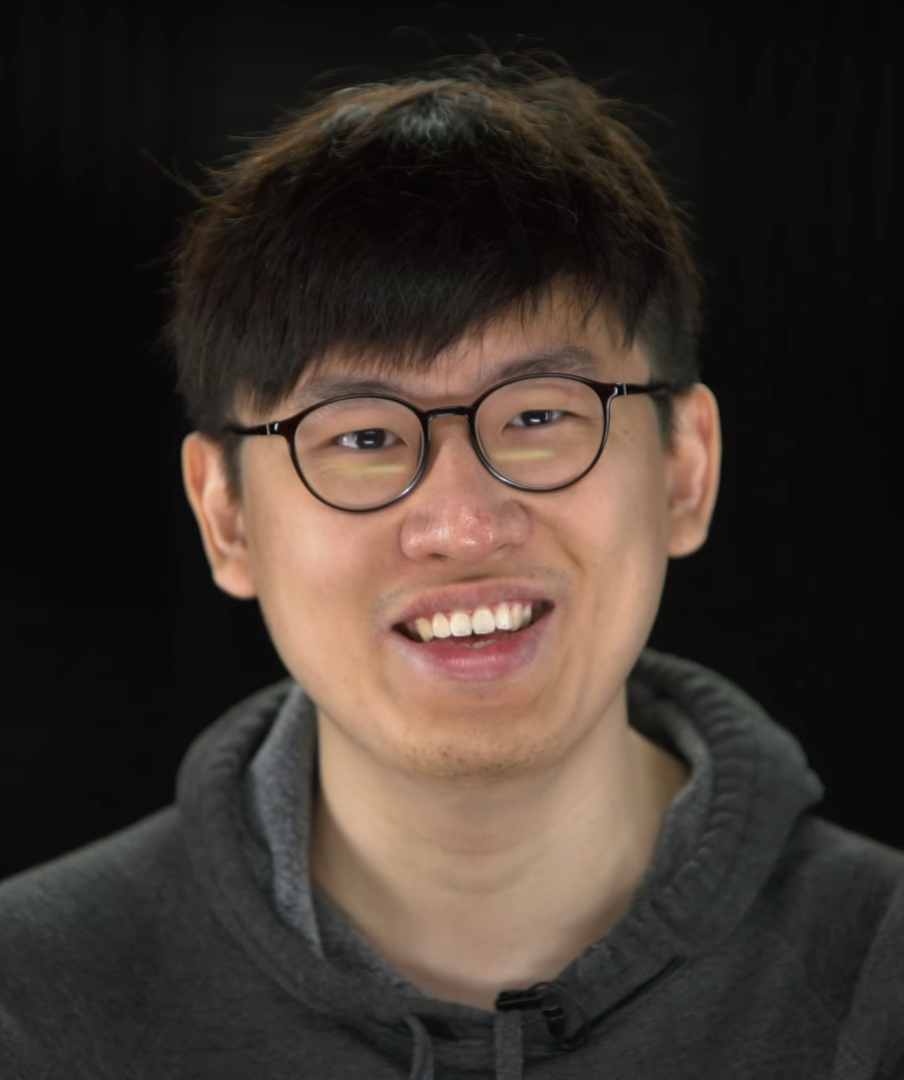
- Lee in 2019

Personal information
- Name: 이윤재 (Lee Yoon-jae)
- Nationality: South Korean

Career information
- Game: League of Legends
- Playing career: 2014–2016, 2018–2019
- Role: Jungler

Team history
- 2015: Team Impulse
- 2016: Cloud9
- 2018: KT Rolster
- 2019: Echo Fox

Lee Yoon-jae (Korean: 이윤재), better known by his in-game name Rush, is a South Korean retired professional League of Legends player. He most recently played as a jungler for Echo Fox of the League of Legends Championship Series.

== Career ==
In November 2014, Rush joined team LCS team LMQ, which was rebranded as Team Impulse a month later. Rush became known for his carry style jungling and strong mechanics on play making champions. Rush was the 2015 NA LCS summer split MVP. Rush led TIP to 4th place in the spring split and 3rd place in the summer split, but failed to qualify for the world championship after losing to Cloud 9 in the world qualifiers.

In November 2015, Rush joined Cloud9 along with former Gravity support Bunny FuFuu. Cloud 9 managed to reach 3rd place in the spring split. Rush played on the main Cloud9 roster until April, when former Cloud9 jungler Meteos returned to the main team. Rush moved to Cloud 9's challenger team until June 14, 2016. After being demoted to the challenger team, he decided to leave Cloud9 and return to South Korea to stream and look for opportunities on Korean teams.

Rush returned to competitive play after an 18-month break, signing with Korean team KT Rolster. He debuted in the final series of the season against Afreeca Freecs.

In November 2018, Rush returned to the LCS and joined Echo Fox. After a mediocre performance in the 2019 spring season and the first half of summer, Rush was released from his contract with Echo Fox on June 30, 2019, and the team received MikeYeung from a trade with Team Liquid to replace him.

In August 2019, CLG announced that Rush would be joining them as a streamer.

In October 2019, Rush participated in a celebrity charity tournament in Albuquerque, New Mexico. Rush’s team finished fourth overall.

In November 2020, Rush announced he would begin his mandatory military service after fulfilling his streaming contract with CLG and would retire from playing League of Legends and streaming as well.

In June 2022, Rush returned to streaming after finishing his mandatory military service.

== Tournament results ==
=== Team Impulse ===
- 4th — 2015 Spring NA LCS playoffs
- 4th — 2015 Summer NA LCS playoffs

=== Cloud9 ===
- 3rd — 2016 NA LCS Summer regular season
- 2nd — 2016 NA LCS Summer playoffs
