= 2015 NA LCS season =

- League: NA LCS
- Sport: League of Legends
- Duration: January 24 – April 19 (Spring); May 30 – August 23 (Summer)
- Teams: 10
- TV partner: Twitch

Spring
- Champions: Team SoloMid
- Runners-up: Cloud9
- Top seed: Team SoloMid
- Season MVP: Søren "Bjergsen" Bjerg (Team SoloMid)

Summer
- Champions: Counter Logic Gaming
- Runners-up: Team SoloMid
- Top seed: Team Liquid
- Season MVP: Lee "Rush" Yoon-jae (Team Impulse)

Regional finals
- Winner: Cloud9

NA LCS seasons
- ← 2014 2016 →

The 2015 NA LCS season was the third year of the North American League of Legends Championship Series. It saw an expansion of the league from eight to ten teams, as well as the introduction of championship points and the regional finals gauntlet to better determine which teams should qualify for the World Championship. The season was divided into spring and summer splits, each consisting of a regular season and playoff stage. The top six teams from the regular season advanced to the playoff stage, with the top two teams receiving a bye to the semifinals. Regular season games and the spring playoffs were played in the Riot Games Studios in Los Angeles, California, while the summer finals were held at Madison Square Garden.

The spring split began on January 24 and concluded with Team SoloMid winning their third NA LCS title on April 19, with a roster consisting of Dyrus, Santorin, Bjergsen, WildTurtle and Lustboy.

The summer split began on May 30 and concluded with Counter Logic Gaming winning their first NA LCS title on August 23, with a roster consisting of ZionSpartan, Xmithie, Pobelter, Huhi, Doublelift and Aphromoo.

The three teams that qualified for the 2015 World Championship were Counter Logic Gaming, Team SoloMid, and Cloud9.

== Spring ==
=== Regular season ===
Pos	Team	Pld	W	L	PCT	Qualification or relegation
1	Team SoloMid	18	13	5	.722	Advance to semifinals
2	Cloud9	19	13	6	.684	Advance to semifinals
3	Counter Logic Gaming	19	12	7	.632	Advance to quarterfinals
4	Team Impulse	18	11	7	.611	Advance to quarterfinals
5	Gravity Gaming	18	10	8	.556	Advance to quarterfinals
6	Team Liquid	19	10	9	.526	Advance to quarterfinals
7	Team 8	19	9	10	.474	
8	Winterfox	18	7	11	.389	Promotion tournament
9	Team Dignitas	18	6	12	.333	Promotion tournament
10	Team Coast	18	1	17	.056	Relegated to NA CS

Source: LoL Esports (Archived September 27, 2015, at the Wayback Machine)
Rules for classification: 1) Winning percentage; 2) head-to-head record; 3) tiebreaker match(es)

=== Playoffs ===
Quarterfinals
3	Counter Logic Gaming	0
6	Team Liquid	3
4	Team Impulse	3
5	Gravity Gaming	1

Semifinals
1	Team SoloMid	3
4	Team Impulse	1
Top seed selects opponent
2	Cloud9	3
6	Team Liquid	2

Final
1	Team SoloMid	3
2	Cloud9	1
Third place
4	Team Impulse	2
6	Team Liquid	3

Source: LoL Esports (Archived September 4, 2015, at the Wayback Machine)

=== Promotion tournament ===
Finals
Winner to 2015 Summer
A1	Winterfox	1
B2	Team Dragon Knights	3
Winner to 2015 Summer
A2	Team Dignitas	3
B1	Team Fusion	2

Source: LoL Esports (Archived September 23, 2015, at the Wayback Machine)

== Summer ==
=== Regular season ===
Pos	Team	Pld	W	L	PCT	Qualification or relegation
1	Team Liquid	19	14	5	.737	Advance to semifinals
2	Counter Logic Gaming	19	13	6	.684	Advance to semifinals
3	Team Impulse	19	13	6	.684	Advance to quarterfinals
4	Gravity Gaming	19	12	7	.632	Advance to quarterfinals
5	Team SoloMid	18	11	7	.611	Advance to quarterfinals
6	Team Dignitas	18	10	8	.556	Advance to quarterfinals
7	Cloud9	19	7	12	.368	
8	Team 8	19	6	13	.316	Promotion tournament
9	Enemy Esports	18	4	14	.222	Promotion tournament
10	Team Dragon Knights	18	3	15	.167	Relegated to NA CS

Source: LoL Esports (Archived September 27, 2015, at the Wayback Machine)
Rules for classification: 1) Winning percentage; 2) head-to-head record; 3) tiebreaker match(es)

=== Playoffs ===
Quarterfinals
3	Team Impulse	3
6	Team Dignitas	0
4	Gravity Gaming	1
5	Team SoloMid	3

Semifinals
1	Team Liquid	1
5	Team SoloMid	3
Top seed selects opponent
2	Counter Logic Gaming	3
3	Team Impulse	0

Final
5	Team SoloMid	0
2	Counter Logic Gaming	3
Third place
1	Team Liquid	3
3	Team Impulse	1

Source: LoL Esports (Archived September 23, 2015, at the Wayback Machine)

=== Promotion tournament ===
Finals
Winner to 2016 Spring
A1	Team 8	3
B2	Team Imagine	1
Winner to 2016 Spring
A2	Enemy Esprts	0
B1	Team Coast	3

Source: LoL Esports (Archived September 26, 2015, at the Wayback Machine)

=== Awards ===
- Most Valuable Player: Rush, Team Impulse
- Rookie of the Split: Move, Gravity
- Coach of the Split: Peter Zhang, Team Liquid
- 1st Team All-Pro:
  - T Impact, Team Impulse
  - J Rush, Team Impulse
  - M FeniX, Team Liquid
  - B Piglet, Team Liquid
  - S Aphromoo, Counter Logic Gaming
- 2nd Team All-Pro:
  - T Quas, Team Liquid
  - J IWillDominate, Team Liquid
  - M Bjergsen, Team SoloMid
  - B Doublelift, Counter Logic Gaming
  - S Adrian, Team Impulse
- 3rd Team All-Pro:
  - T ZionSpartan, Counter Logic Gaming
  - J Move, Gravity
  - M Keane, Gravity
  - B Altec, Gravity
  - S Bunny FuFuu, Gravity

== Worlds qualification ==
=== Championship Points ===
Pos	Team	Spr	Sum	Total	Qualification
1	Counter Logic Gaming	10	AQ	AQ	2015 League of Legends World Championship
2	Team SoloMid	90	90	180	2015 League of Legends World Championship
3	Team Liquid	50	70	120	Advance to regional qualifier
4	Team Impulse	30	40	70	Advance to regional qualifier
5	Cloud9	70	0	70	Advance to regional qualifier
6	Gravity Gaming	10	20	30	Advance to regional qualifier
7	Team Dignitas	0	20	20	
8	Team 8	0	0	0	
9	Enemy Esports	N/A	0	0	
10	Team Dragon Knights	N/A	0	0	
11	Winterfox	0	N/A	0	
12	Team Coast	0	N/A	0	

Source: 2015 NA LCS Rulebook (Archived September 5, 2015, at the Wayback Machine)
Rules for classification: 1) Championship points; 2) Summer Split points; 3) Summer Split regular season winning percentage; 4) Head-to-head record

=== Regional qualifier ===
Round 1
5	Cloud9	3
6	Gravity Gaming	2

Round 2
4	Team Impulse	2
5	Cloud9	3

Finals
3	Team Liquid	1
5	Cloud9	3

Source: LoL Esports (Archived September 26, 2015, at the Wayback Machine)
