= Darshan Upadhyaya =

Canadian-American professional esports player

Darshan
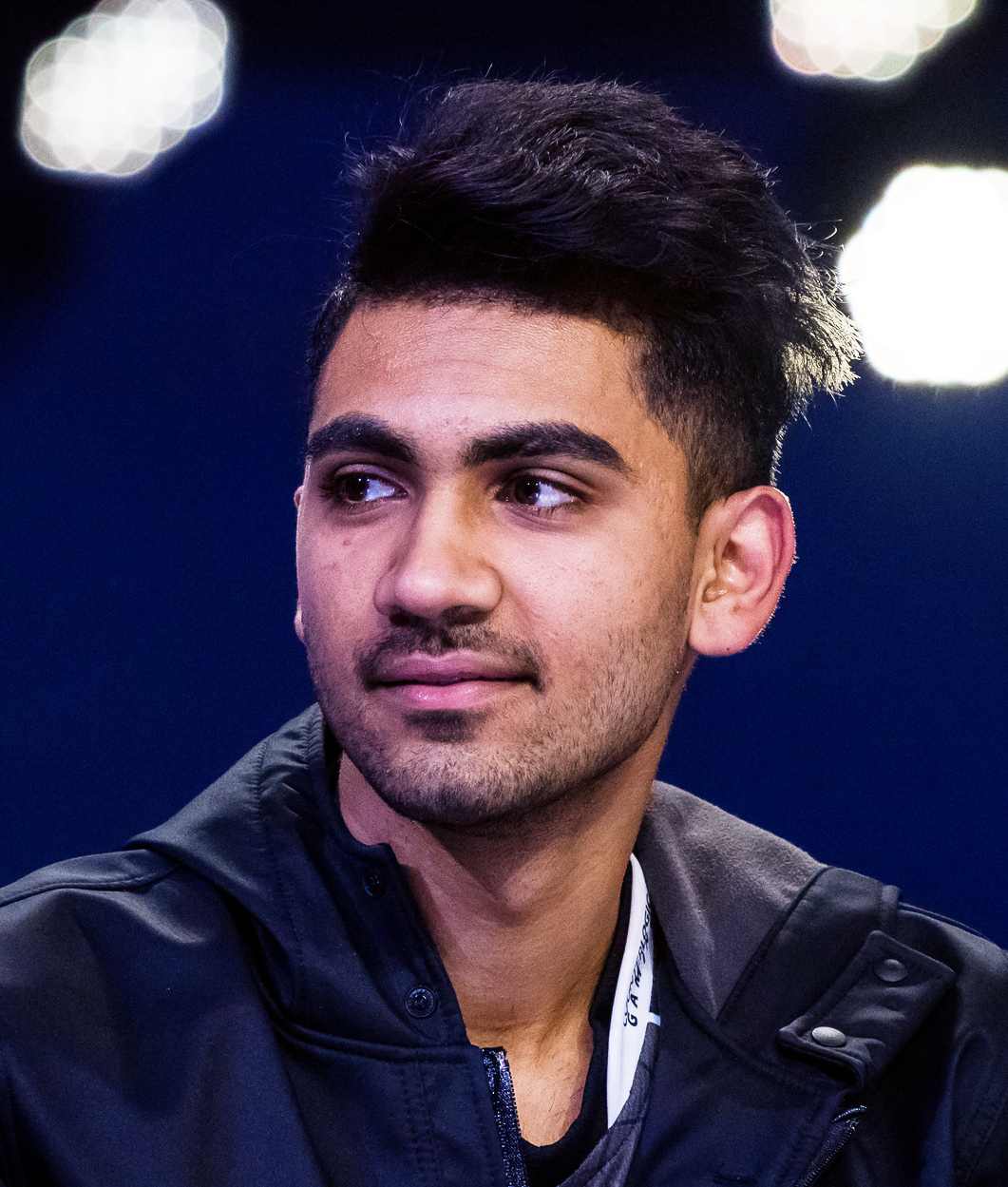
- Upadhyaya in 2016

Personal information
- Name: Darshan Upadhyaya
- Born: November 12, 1994 (age 32)
- Nationality: Canadian–American

Career information
- Game: League of Legends
- Playing career: 2012–2023
- Role: Top laner

Team history
- 2012: Monomaniac eSports
- 2012–2013: Team Dynamic
- 2013: Good Game University
- 2013–2014: Team Coast
- 2014: Team Dignitas
- 2015–2019: Counter Logic Gaming
- 2019–2020: GGS Academy
- 2021–2022: Cloud9 Academy
- 2023: 100 Thieves Challengers

Career highlights and awards
- 2× NA LCS champion

Darshan Upadhyaya, better known mononymously as Darshan and as ZionSpartan, is a Canadian-born American League of Legends player who played professionally from 2012–2023. He is most known for his four-and-a-half-year tenure as Counter Logic Gaming's top laner from November 2014 to May 2019, a time during which CLG and ZionSpartan made both the 2015 World Championship and the 2016 World Championship. ZionSpartan and CLG also won the 2015 NALCS Summer Split as well as the 2016 NALCS Spring Split. From the start of his career to November 2015, Upadhyaya played under the screenname ZionSpartan; from November 2015–2019, he played under the screenname Darshan; in 2020 he resumed playing as ZionSpartan; and in 2021 he has returned to Darshan.

Darshan was elected the inaugural president of the LCS Players Association in 2018, a loose union-like advocacy organization that represents the interests of contracted players in the LCS, and held that that position until 2022 or 2023.

== Personal life ==
Upadhyaya was born on November 12, 1994, and is of Indian origin. He resided in Poway, California, before joining professional esports.

While growing up, Upadhyaya was often called by his peers his in-game name, ZionSpartan. This was branded by the NALCS in a video titled "Even his teacher called him ZionSpartan."

Upadhyaya announced on Twitter in November 2023 that he was retiring from eSports.

== Tournament results ==
=== Counter Logic Gaming ===
- 1st – 2015 Summer NA LCS
- 12–13th – 2015 League of Legends World Championship
- 2nd – IEM X San Jose
- 1st – 2016 Spring NA LCS
- 2nd – 2016 Mid-Season Invitational
- 4th – 2016 NA LCS Summer regular season
- 4th – 2016 NA LCS Summer playoffs
