= Wu Xiang =

Wu Xiang may refer to:

- Wu Xiang (Ming general)
- Wu Xiang (athlete)
- Five-spice powder, or Wuxiang powder
- Ngo Hiang, or Wuxiang

== See also ==
- Wu Xian (disambiguation)
