= Bay State College =

Private college in Boston, Massachusetts, U.S.

Coordinates: 42.3521°N 71.0771°W

- Type: Private for-profit college
- Active: 1946–2023
- Accreditation: NECHE
- Location: Boston, Massachusetts, United States
- Campus: 1.50 acres (0.61 ha); Urban
- Colors: Red and White
- Website: baystate.edu

Bay State College (Bay State or BSC) was a private for-profit college in the Back Bay neighborhood of Boston, Massachusetts. It was founded in 1946 and was accredited by the New England Commission of Higher Education. In 2021, after several years of financial challenges and claims of fraud, the accreditor began to issue formal warnings and demand further information from the college; it closed two years later.

Bay State College specialized in business, information technology, and healthcare. The college offered associate and bachelor's degree programs. The college had three divisions: Day, Evening and Online. It had an additional campus in Taunton, Massachusetts. At the time of its closure, it was owned by Ambow Education Holding Ltd. of the Cayman Islands and Beijing, People's Republic of China.

== History ==
Bay State College opened in 1946 to serve the airline industry by providing "hands-on skills and paying particular attention to a strong educational foundation." One of its founders, George J. Brennan, was a Marine fighter pilot in World War II. The original location was at 70 State Street in Boston.

Bay State moved to Back Bay in 1961.

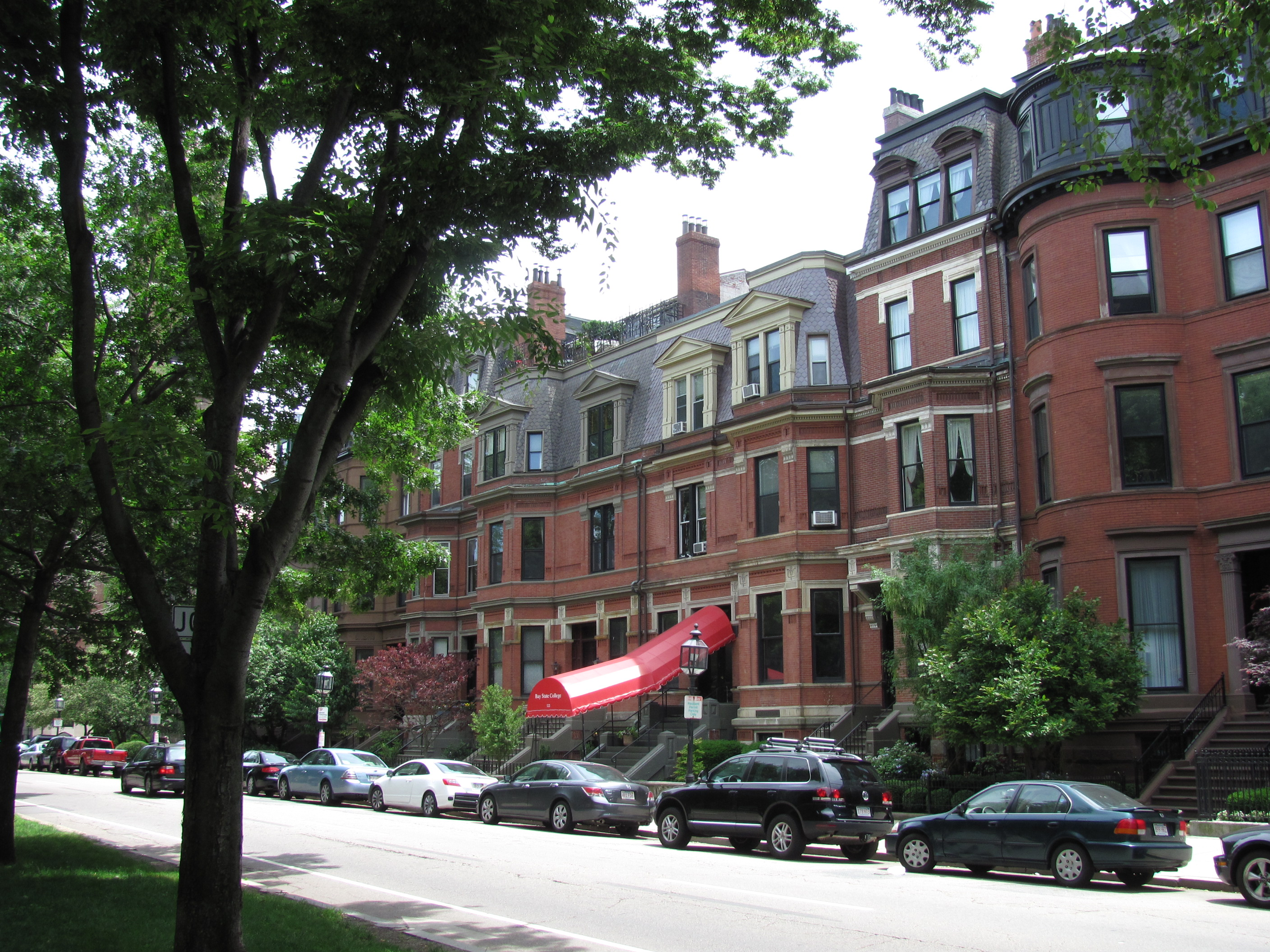
Bay State College, Boston MA. The campus was sold in 2017.

In 1975, Bay State College was initially authorized to grant associate degrees by the Commonwealth of Massachusetts.

=== Pfannenstiel Family (1988-2017) ===
In 1988, the original owners sold the school to Thomas E. Langford and Frederick G. Pfannenstiehl. Pfannenstiehl was president and owner of Educor Inc. and president of Burdett College as well as Bay State College. The Pfannenstiehl family also owned Harrison College in Indiana.

In 1989, Bay State became accredited by the New England Commission of Higher Education (NECHE, formerly NEASC).

In 2004, Bay State College was authorized by the state and NECHE to grant bachelor's degrees in business, Fashion, and Entertainment Management.

In 2013, BSC relocated its Middleboro campus to Taunton, Massachusetts.

=== Bay State College as a subsidiary of Ambow Education Holding (2017-present) ===
On September 29, 2017, the Commission on Institutions of Higher Education of the New England Association of Schools and Colleges approved the sale of Bay State College to Ambow Education Holding Ltd. Ambow acquired the school with a $6 million loan from Sino Accord Investments Limited.

In 2019, BSC moved its offices to 31 St. James Avenue in the Park Square Building. In the same year, BSC settled with the Massachusetts Attorney General for $1.1 million over allegations it was using false claims in their marketing and failing to comply with the state's for-profit college regulations.

In 2020, during the COVID-19 pandemic, Anbow Education and Bay State College received a $1.47 million federal PPP loan through the Bank of America and an additional $794,000 in CARES Act-HEERF funding. The following year, the Small Business Administration fully forgave the outstanding principal of the PPP loan.

During the pandemic, Bay State College also began working with Cisco to provide contact tracing. According to BSC, "faculty, staff, and students were each issued a lanyard and a badge holder containing a Bluetooth Low-Energy (BLE) beacon, which they were required to wear visibly at all times while on campus."

The college was placed on probation by its accreditor, the New England Commission of Higher Education, in 2022, over concerns about its finances and governance. Shortly after being placed on probation, the chief financial officer of the college's parent company resigned. The college's enrollment had also dropped significantly, from a peak at more than 1200 students in 2010 to about 300 in 2022.

In the fall of 2022, Bay State College's enrollment had dwindled to 215 students. In December 2022 the US Department of Education placed the school on heightened cash monitoring.

In January 2023, The Boston Globe reported that Bay State College was planning to eliminate most of its academic programs, maintaining only nursing and business. On record with WGBH, Senator Elizabeth Warren stated:

"We've watched this pattern before with these for-profit colleges. They start showing all kinds of warning signs," Warren said, before ticking off some of Bay State's problems. "Their enrollment has dropped substantially. They are losing money. They have canceled classes. They haven't paid their rent." "It's time to put them under a lot more scrutiny so that students are not left holding the bag."

In March 2023 Bay State College faced eviction after reportedly owing more than $720,000 in unpaid rent and fees.

On May 11, 2023, the board of trustees of Bay State College voted to permanently close at the end of academic year 2022-23.

== Accreditation ==
Bay State College was accredited by the New England Commission of Higher Education until its closure in 2023. The college was authorized to award Associate of Science, Associate of Applied Science, and Bachelor of Science degrees by the Commonwealth of Massachusetts: .

Bay State College's Associate of Science program in Physical Therapist Assistant was accredited by the Commission on Accreditation in Physical Therapy Education (CAPTE). Its Associate of Science in Nursing program was accredited by the Accreditation Commission for Education in Nursing (ACEN) and approved by the Massachusetts Board of Registration in Nursing.

In April 2021, BSC's accreditor asked the college to "show cause why the College should not be placed on probation or have its accreditation withdrawn." NECHE "expressed concern about the College's ability to implement its plans to increase enrollment, enhance financial stability, and assure the sufficiency of appropriately qualified faculty and staff. The commission further noted the lack of robust systems to evaluate educational effectiveness and to use data for planning and institutional improvement." A show cause hearing was held in November 2021, and on April 21, 2022, the commission voted to place Bay State College on probation because the college was not meeting standards on institutional resources and organization and governance. Specifically, Bay State did not demonstrate that its resources are sufficient to sustain the quality of its educational programs and to support institutional improvement now and in the foreseeable future and that it has an effective system of governance and sufficient administrative capacity. In January 2023, NECHE announced that it would withdraw Bay State's accreditation by August 31, 2023, a move that the college appealed. Accreditation was withdrawn on August 31, 2023.

== Faculty ==
According to the US Department of Education's College Navigator, BSC had 7 full-time instructors and 85 part-time instructors.

== Finances ==
In 2020, Bay State College had $6 million in assets and $4.1 million in liabilities. While Bay State College had financial deficits, it cut costs to narrow those deficits, from $4.1 million in 2020 to a preliminary 2021 deficit of approximately $1.7 million. Its parent company, Ambow Education, provided additional funding when needed.

== Esports ==
In 2018, Bay State College was the first college in Massachusetts to join the National Association of Collegiate Esports. The esports team competed in Call of Duty, League of Legends, Fortnite, Overwatch, and Madden. In 2022, the Super Smash contingent won the NACE National Championship over the University of Texas Austin.

== Student outcomes ==
Bay State College's overall graduation rate was 18 percent, with a transfer out rate of 24 percent. According to the College Scorecard, median student loan debt is $25,813. The nursing program had an average NCLEX-RN pass rate of 80.9 percent.

== Ambow Education Holding Ltd. ==
Ambow Education Holding Ltd is a Cayman Islands and China-based corporation that also owns NewSchool of Architecture and Design. According to Ambow Education's financial reports, the People's Republic of China (PRC) government "exerts substantial influence" over their business.

In 2013, Ambow was sued for "orchestrating a 'fake acquisition' to facilitate its initial public offering in the US" three years earlier. Ambow liquidated its assets and reorganized the company.

In 2017, Ambow acquired Bay State College and in 2020 it bought NewSchool of Architecture and Design.

In 2022, Ambow agreed to sell its Chinese assets to Clover Wealth Ltd. Xuejun Xie, a member of Ambow's Board, is listed as Clover Wealth's director in the purchase agreement.

Ambow Education claims to have a number of US patents, including patents related to artificial intelligence and holographic technology.

== See also ==
- List of for-profit universities and colleges
- For-profit colleges in the United States
