= Hamm (surname) =

Hamm is a surname. Notable people with the name include:

- Adam Hamm (born 1971), American politician
- Bob Hamm (American football) (born 1959), American football player
- Doyle Hamm (1957–2021), American man convicted of murder
- Harold Hamm (born 1945), American businessman
- Hildegard Hamm-Brücher (1921–2016), a German politician
- Jaden Hamm (born 2002), American baseball player
- John Hamm (born 1938), Canadian politician
- Jon Hamm (born 1971), American actor
- Josip Hamm (1905–1986), Croatian Slavist
- Leonard Hamm (born 1949) American police commissioner
- Ludwig Hamm (1921–1999), German politician
- Malik Hamm (born 2000), American football player
- Mia Hamm (born 1972), American soccer player
- Morgan Hamm (born 1982), American gymnast
- Paul Hamm (born 1982), American gymnast
- Peter Hamm (1937–2019), German poet, author, journalist, editor, and literary critic
- Philip Hamm (1859–?), Former member of the Wisconsin State Assembly
- Regie Hamm (born 1967), American songwriter, musician, writer
- Sam Hamm (born 1955), American screenwriter
- Shannon Hamm (born 1967), American guitar player
- Stuart Hamm (born 1960), American bass player

== See also ==
- Ham (surname), mainly Korean surname
