= Zhang Xian =

Zhang Xian or Xian Zhang may refer to:

- Zhang Xian (deity), Chinese deity, enemy of the eclipse-creating Tiangou and protector of unborn infants and male children
- Zhang Xian (poet) (990–1078), Chinese poet from the Song Dynasty
- Xian Zhang (conductor) (born 1973), Chinese-American conductor
- Zhang Xian (volleyball) (born 1985), Chinese female volleyball player

== See also ==
- Zhang (disambiguation)
- Xian (disambiguation)
