= World Cyber Games 2013 =

International esports competition

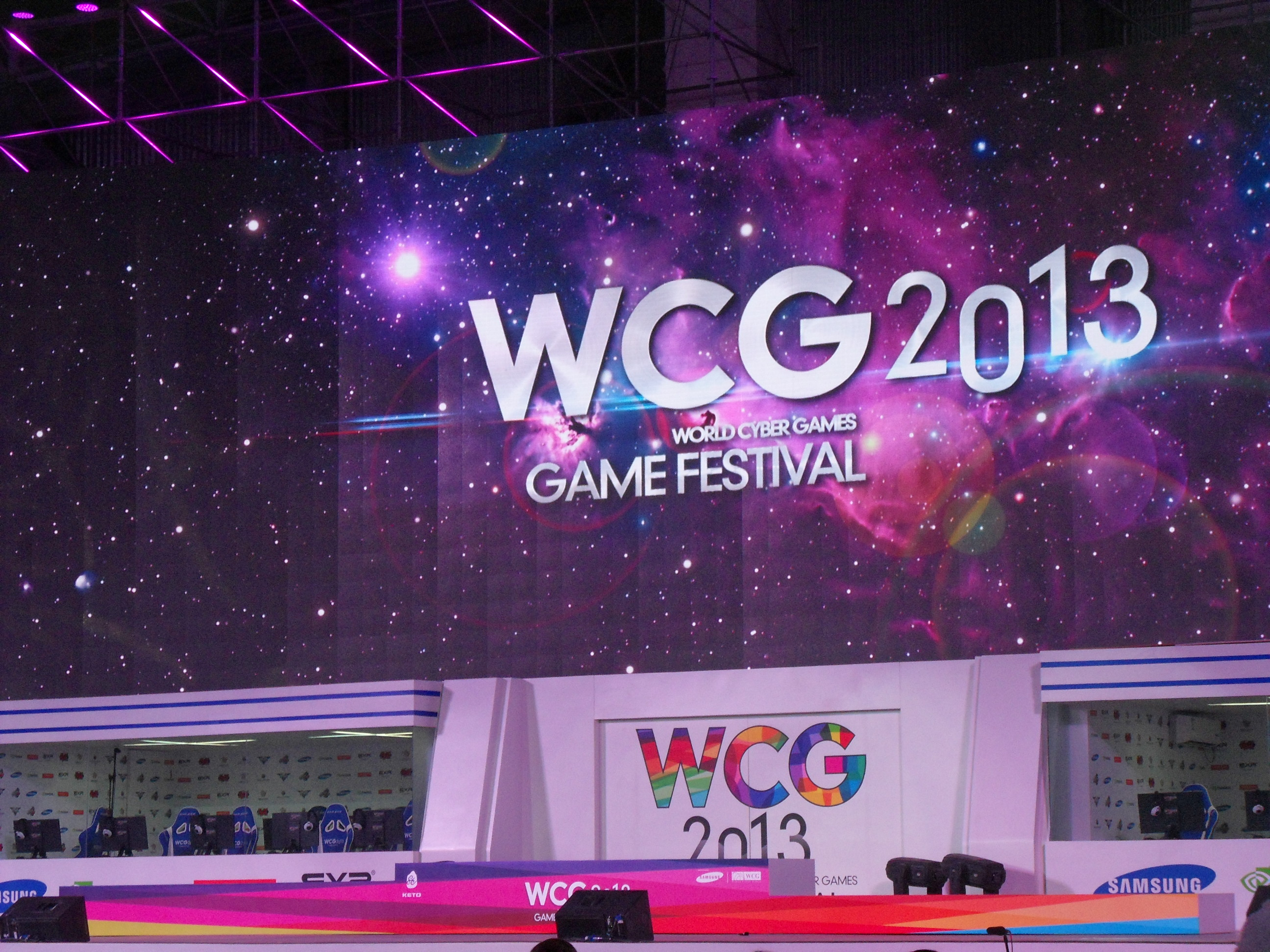
WCG 2013 Grand Final in Kunshan, China

The 2013 World Cyber Games (also known as WCG 2013) took place from 28 November to 1 December 2013 in Kunshan, Jiangsu, China. It was the third time the World Cyber Games was held in China. The event hosted 500 players from 40 countries

== Official games ==
=== PC games ===
- Crossfire (SmileGate)
- FIFA 14 (Electronic Arts)
- League of Legends (Riot Games)
- StarCraft II: Wings of Liberty (Blizzard)
- Super Street Fighter IV: Arcade Edition Ver. 2012 (Capcom)
- Warcraft III: The Frozen Throne (Blizzard)
- World of Tanks (Wargaming)

=== Promotion games ===
- Assault Fire (Tencent)
- QQ Speed (Tencent Holdings)

== Results ==
=== Official ===
Event	Gold		Silver		Bronze	
Crossfire	QCES.QQVIP (China)	Liu Zhiyang (ROYALSoLoLzy)	MSI EVOLUTION GAMING (Philippines)	Royce Bentley Omaga (MSI.RPGE)	HG.QQVIP (China)	Zhao Lumin (HGQQVIP/Mino)
Crossfire	QCES.QQVIP (China)	Lang Shu'ai (ROYAL70KGBLL)	MSI EVOLUTION GAMING (Philippines)	Jupiter Mars Gaboy (MSI.ELGEE)	HG.QQVIP (China)	Ha Lun (HGQQVIP/Harlen)
Crossfire	QCES.QQVIP (China)	Song Hongqi (ROYALBAOBAO3)	MSI EVOLUTION GAMING (Philippines)	Judan Cruz (MSI.KART)	HG.QQVIP (China)	Nian-Peng Sun (HGQQVIP/Enpi)
Crossfire	QCES.QQVIP (China)	Xie Xibin (ROYALYAYAWoW)	MSI EVOLUTION GAMING (Philippines)	James Michael Doron (MSI.NASMI)	HG.QQVIP (China)	He Yong (HGQQVIP/2xing)
Crossfire	QCES.QQVIP (China)	Xu Honggu (ROYALLINKIN9)	MSI EVOLUTION GAMING (Philippines)	Dale Duque (MSI.DHALEE)	HG.QQVIP (China)	Li Shuoliu (HGQQVIP/Aplo)
FIFA 14	(Iran) Keivan Javadi Elyaderani (FG|TNII)		(Germany) Tim Schiewe (Schiewe)		(Argentina) Juan Francisco Sotullo (PATAN)	
League of Legends	CJ Entus Blaze (South Korea)	Lee Ho-Jong (Flame)	OMG (China)	Li Haoyu (Sicca)	Team WE (China)	Wei Handong (WE.GIGABYTE.CaoMei)
League of Legends	CJ Entus Blaze (South Korea)	Kang Gyeong-Min (DayDream)	OMG (China)	Yin Le (LoveLin)	Team WE (China)	Yu Jingxi (WE.GIGABYTE.Misaya)
League of Legends	CJ Entus Blaze (South Korea)	Kang Chan-Yong (Ambition)	OMG (China)	Yu Jiajun (Cool)	Team WE (China)	Feng Zhuojun (WE.GIGABYTE.Fzzf)
League of Legends	CJ Entus Blaze (South Korea)	Kim Jin Hyun (Emperor)	OMG (China)	Zhu Jiawen (NaMei)	Team WE (China)	Ming Kai (WE.GIGABYTE.Mann)
League of Legends	CJ Entus Blaze (South Korea)	Jang-Sik Ham (Lustboy)	OMG (China)	Gao Diping (Gogoing)	Team WE (China)	Gao Xuecheng (WE.GIGABYTE.WeiXiao)
StarCraft II: Heart of the Swarm	(South Korea) Kim Min-cheol (Soulkey)		(South Korea) Kim Jeong-hun (Sora)		(South Korea) Won Lee-sak (PartinG)	
Super Street Fighter IV: Arcade Edition Ver. 2012	(Japan) Keita Ai (Fuudo)		(United States) Kevin Landon (EMP Dieminion)		(Hong Kong) Cheng Jonny Lai (Humanbomb)	
Warcraft III: The Frozen Throne	(China) Huang Xiang (TH000)		(South Korea) Jang Jae Ho (Moon)		(South Korea) Eom Hyo-Seop (FoCuS)	
World of Tanks	Team Dignitas	Dmytro Frishman (NaVi_SL1DE)	Team WUSA (Germany)	Pascal Griebsch (Dr_Tuer)	Fulcrum Gaming (United States)	Marco Martinez (Fzerox)
World of Tanks	Team Dignitas	Ruslan Iermakov (Luciquell)	Team WUSA (Germany)	Can Pintul (LDNexus)	Fulcrum Gaming (United States)	Kyle Nieset (Friction)
World of Tanks	Team Dignitas	Andrii Les (Rinoll)	Team WUSA (Germany)	Jan Brammer (Lauralanthalasa)	Fulcrum Gaming (United States)	Kolby Brooks (Junior_g99p)
World of Tanks	Team Dignitas	Roman Pavlenko (povel)	Team WUSA (Germany)	Johannes Najjar (Fkkschnitzel)	Fulcrum Gaming (United States)	Kirill Bondar (Sov13t)
World of Tanks	Team Dignitas	Oleksii Nogin (Arclit)	Team WUSA (Germany)	Michael Kelbg (Comandante)	Fulcrum Gaming (United States)	James Starr (Relics)
World of Tanks	Team Dignitas	Artem Rozenko (Stalker_ua)	Team WUSA (Germany)	Roman Podhorny (pSychoaa)	Fulcrum Gaming (United States)	David Williams (Nagatron)
World of Tanks	Team Dignitas	Sergey Pisotsky (Diver233)	Team WUSA (Germany)	Karim Turdikulov (OstapBender)	Fulcrum Gaming (United States)	Alex Spillman (hugomaximus)

=== Promotion ===
Event	Gold		Silver		Bronze	
Assault Fire (NiZhan)	SteelSeries*Class302 (China)	Jun Tian (Junjun*)	EP (China)	Wei Yuan (Robert)	Game7 e-sports (Brazil)	Gabriel Vinicius Correia Martins (modera-KOMBOZ4)
Assault Fire (NiZhan)	SteelSeries*Class302 (China)	Yaoru Yu (RURU*)	EP (China)	Wei Zhang (Unique)	Game7 e-sports (Brazil)	Walney Alves Reis (Jonn-MAVERICK)
Assault Fire (NiZhan)	SteelSeries*Class302 (China)	Zihuan Zhang (z1an*)	EP (China)	Yu Chao Zhang (Prince)	Game7 e-sports (Brazil)	Jonathan Da Gloria Costa (Jhow-CAMARO)
Assault Fire (NiZhan)	SteelSeries*Class302 (China)	Chenyang Zhao (Zhaozhao*)	EP (China)	Yu Zhou (Match)	Game7 e-sports (Brazil)	Rogerio Lopez Aranha (RoY-MUSTANG)
Assault Fire (NiZhan)	SteelSeries*Class302 (China)	Xinglong Feng (longlong*)	EP (China)	Yu-Jian Wang (XiaoHei)	Game7 e-sports (Brazil)	Caio Jorge Penha da Silva Lazzaro (400 kg)
QQ Speed	(China) Wei-Yi Tan (TAN Weiyi)		(China) Xu-Dong Li (Li Xudong)		No Entry	
QQ Speed (Team)	The Lunatic asylum (China)	YuJiang Shi (Shi YuJiang)	Telecom female Athletics (China)	Wei Luo (Luo Wei)	No Entry	
QQ Speed (Team)	The Lunatic asylum (China)	Tian-Tai Kang (Kang TianTai)	Telecom female Athletics (China)	Min Liu (Liu Min)	No Entry	
