= Ham Jeung-im =

South Korean writer (born 1964)

Ham Jeung Im (Korean: 함정임; born 1964) is a South Korean writer, professor, and former literary editor. She began writing articles on Korean literature for the journal Monthly Literature & Thought when she graduated from university, and went onto become the editor-in-chief of the journal Writer’s World and the publisher Solbook. She made her literary debut in 1990 when her short story “Gwangjangeuro ganeun gil” (광장으로 가는 길 The Road to the Square) won the Dong-a Ilbo New Writer's Contest and has written prolifically since. In 1993, she married Kim So-jin, a leading realist writer in South Korea. She stayed with him until his death in 1997. Her experience as a writer, editor, and spouse of another writer gives her a unique perspective on 1990s Korean literature.

== Life ==
Ham Jeung Im was born in 1964 in Gimje, South Korea. She studied French language and literature at Ewha Womans University. As a university student, she knew very little about the South Korean literary scene to the extent that she was not able to name any of the major literary journals in the country. In her final year of university, however, she won a poetry contest held by SNU Press. Subsequently, the journal Monthly Literature & Thought asked her to write a feature article entitled “Issues in Korean Literature Through the Eyes of a College Student” and even hired her when she graduated. Starting out as a rookie staff writer, her sudden exposure to a range of Korean literature made her recognize her own ignorance of the subject, which ignited her latent passion for writing. It is during this time that she wrote her award-winning debut short story, “Gwangjangeuro ganeun gil”(광장으로 가는 길 The Road to the Square). Ham Jeung Im believes the story won an award mainly because “it is a confessional story that diverges from the dominant writing style of the eighties.” Following her tenure at Monthly Literature & Thought, she enjoyed a successful editing career as the editor-in-chief of the journal Writer’s World and the publisher Solbook. At the same time, her writing career took off and she emerged as a prominent female writer in South Korea in the 1990s.

In 1993, Ham Jeung Im married her romantic partner and literary colleague Kim So-jin. She took a hiatus for two and a half years, during which she grappled with the question of what role literature must play in the battle between print and video media. In 1997, her husband died at the age of 35. In 2005, she married Park Hyeong-sup, a professor at Pusan National University. She currently works at the Korean Literature department of Dong-A University and juggles research with writing.

== Writing ==
Ham Jeung Im describes the themes and style of her early work as follows:

“What was I to write about? My experience of how the individual can be oppressed by the group or historical forces inspired me to write ‘Gwangjangeuro ganeun gil’ (광장으로 가는 길 The Road to the Square). From then to the time I wrote Iyagi, tteoreojineun gamyeon (이야기, 떨어지는 가면 Story, Falling Mask) (1992), the issue I was most interested in was communication. My guilt at not participating in the 1980s anti-government movement out of cowardice and my fear of public squares heavily influenced the way I view the world and write literature. A more immediate influence was the distress, powerlessness, and inevitable sense of disconnect I felt up against large newspaper organizations in the process of my literary debut. Literature held little meaning for me other than to go back to the beginning and find the right place for each being. It was a Ulyssean struggle to return to my origins after ‘the group’ collapsed. I was interested in exploring existence, which is something that was pitifully destroyed by the rigorism and rules of the eighties.”

To write about the new ethos of the 1990s, which involved exploring existence without being bound by the rigid conventions of the 1980s focusing on history and the nation, Ham Jeung Im chose subject matter or forms that radically differed from the previous decade’s. One critic observes that her early work’s “overuse of pronouns” is “likely an influence from Indo-European languages” and that she “experiments with not revealing the subject of her story right away.”

Ham Jeung Im later shifts her attention from the ethos of the nineties toward women. Her second short story collection Bameun malhanda (밤은 말한다 The Night Speaks) continues to investigate the origins of writing fiction, while addressing the existential solitude of women and the oppression they face in their daily lives. Critic Kim Mi-hyeon notes that “all of her protagonists are female writers,” who “view the world as a desert full of sand graves, feeling like a perpetual outsider or a wanderer with no true home.” Testing out new themes or styles and constantly asking questions about female agency are two of the most important aspects in understanding Ham Jeung Im's works.

== Works ==
=== Short story collections ===
1. 『저녁식사가 끝난 뒤』, 문학동네, 2015년, ISBN 9788954635769 (After Dinner. Munhakdongne, 2015.)
2. 『곡두』, 열림원, 2009년, ISBN 9788970636306 (Phantom. Yolimwon, 2009.)
3. 『네 마음의 푸른 눈』, 문학동네, 2006년, ISBN 9788954601337 (The Blue Eyes of Your Heart. Munhakdongne, 2006.)
4. 『버스, 지나가다』, 민음사, 2002년, ISBN 9788937403965 (The Bus Passes. Minumsa, 2002.)
5. 『당신의 물고기』, 민음사, 2000년 ISBN 9788937403446 (Your Fish. Minumsa, 2000.)
6. 『행복』, 랜덤하우스코리아, 1998년, ISBN 9788983751799 (Happiness. Random House Korea, 1998.)
7. 『동행』, 강, 1998년, ISBN 9788982180385 (Companion. Gang, 1998.)
8. 『밤은 말한다』, 세계사, 1996년, ISBN 9788933800867 (The Night Speaks. Segyesa, 1996.)
9. 『이야기, 떨어지는 가면』, 세계사, 1992, ISBN 9788933800195 (Story, Falling Mask. Segyesa, 1992.)

=== Novels and non-fiction ===
1. 『무엇보다 소설을 - 더 깊게, 더 짙게, 혼자만을 위한 지독한 독서』, 예담, 2017년, ISBN 9788959134748 (Fiction Above All: Deeper and Denser, an Intense Reading for Only Myself. Yedam, 2017.)
2. 『먹다, 사랑하다, 떠나다 - 노마드 소설가 함정임의 세계 식도락 기행』, 푸르메, 2014년, ISBN 9788992650915 (I Ate, I Loved, I Left: Gastronomical Adventures of the Nomad Novelist Ham Jeung Im. Purme, 2014.)
3. 『소설가의 여행법 - 소설을 사랑하기에 그곳으로 떠나다』, 예담, 2012년, ISBN 9788959136605 (How a Novelist Travels: Visiting Places in the Books You Love. Yedam, 2012.)
4. 『내 남자의 책』, 뿔(웅진), 2011년, ISBN 9788901127583 (My Man’s Book. Bbul, 2011.)
5. 『나를 미치게 하는 것들』, 푸르메, 2007년, ISBN 9788995800362 (Things That Drive Me Crazy. Purme, 2007.)
6. 『아주 사소한 중독』, 작가정신, 2006년, ISBN 9788972882701 (A Very Trivial Addiction. Jakkajungsin, 2006.)
7. 『춘하추동』, 민음사, 2004년, ISBN 9788937480508 (Four Seasons. Minumsa, 2004.)
8. 『인생의 사용 - 소설가 함정임의 프랑스 파리 산책』, 해냄, 2003년, ISBN 9788973374786 (Using Life: Novelist Ham Jeung Im’s Walk around Paris. Hainaim, 2003.)

== Awards ==
- 2013: 37th Yi Sang Literary Award Runner-up
- 2012: 36th Yi Sang Literary Award Runner-up
- 2006: 30th Yi Sang Literary Award Runner-up
