= Fenix (gamer) =

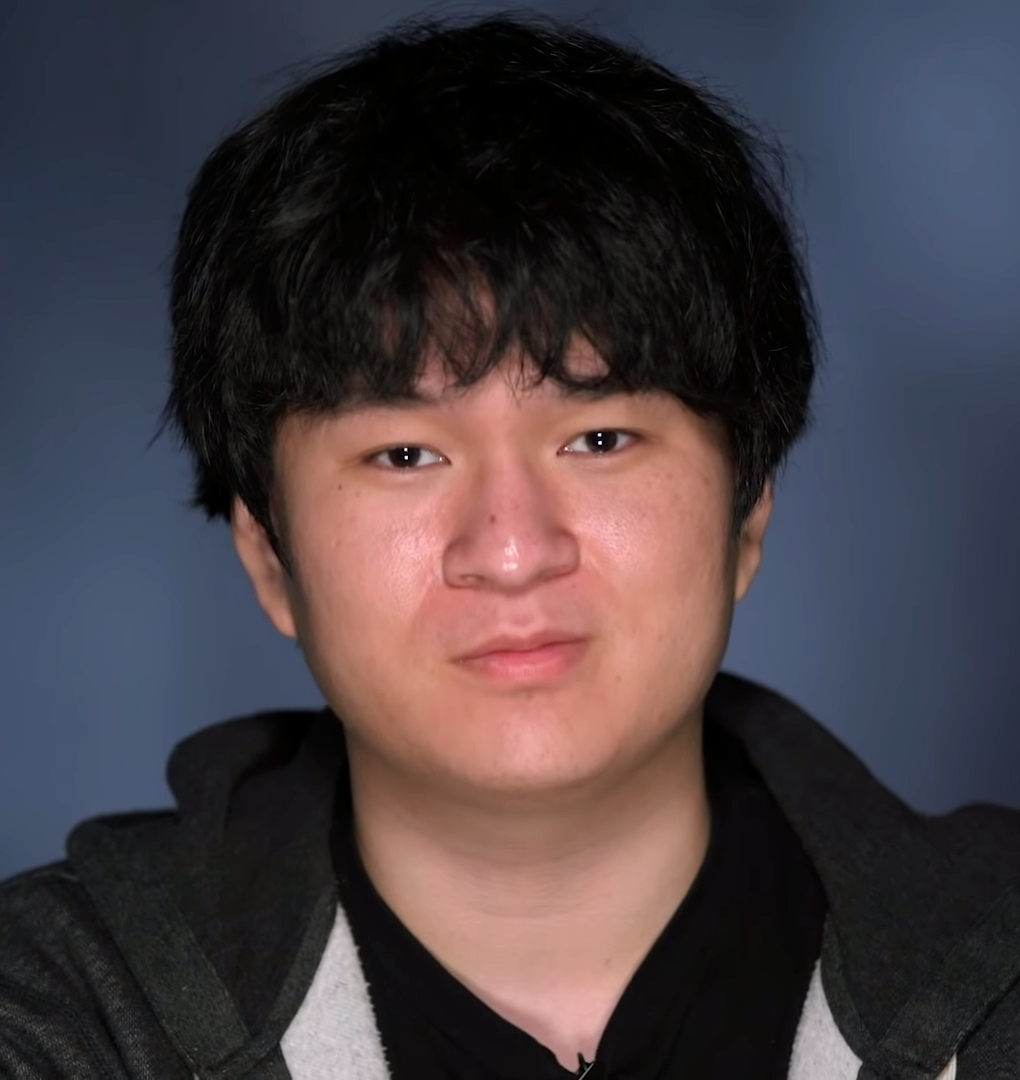
- Kim in 2019

Personal information
- Name: 김재훈 (Kim Jae-hun)
- Nationality: South Korean

Career information
- Games: League of Legends
- Playing career: 2013–present
- Role: Mid Laner

Team history
- 2013: Eat Sleep Game
- 2013–2014: Jin Air Falcons
- 2015–2016: Team Liquid
- 2017: Gold Coin United
- 2018–2019: Echo Fox
- 2020: Dignitas Academy
- 2020: Dignitas
- 2023: TSM

Kim Jae-hun (Korean: 김재훈), better known by his in-game name Fenix, is a South Korean professional League of Legends player who previously played the mid laner for TSM.

== Career ==
Fenix began his professional career in 2013 by signing with the team "Eat Sleep Game". Fenix didn't catch his big break until singing onto Team Liquid in 2015. His stay there was rather brief and was dropped from Liquid at the end of the 2016 season. The legacy he created while there would cause Gold Coin United and Echo Fox to take an interest in him. Fenix was signed onto Echo Fox at the end of the 2017 season. Fenix would later be released at the end of the 2018 season, with little to no warning. This situation caused him to not have enough time to sign onto a new team. Fenix is later signed back onto Echo Fox, who ended up disbanding because of inner conflicts, thus leaving Fenix without a team once again.

== Tournament results ==
=== Team Liquid ===
- 3rd – 2015 NA LCS Summer
- 3rd – 2015 NA LCS Spring
- 4th – 2016 NA LCS Spring playoffs
- 5th – 2016 NA LCS Summer regular season
- 5th–6th – 2016 NA LCS Summer playoffs

=== Echo Fox ===
- 2nd – 2018 NA LCS Spring regular season
- 4th – 2018 NA LCS Summer regular season
