= Emperor Xian (disambiguation) =

Emperor Xian can refer to:

- Emperor Xian of Han (汉獻帝, 181–234), personal name Liu Xie
- Yongzheng Emperor (1678–1735), posthumous name Emperor Xian (憲皇帝)
- Xianfeng Emperor (1831–1861), posthumous name Emperor Xian (顯皇帝)

== See also ==
- Marquis Xian of Jin (Western Zhou)
