= IWDominate =

American esports personality (born 1990)

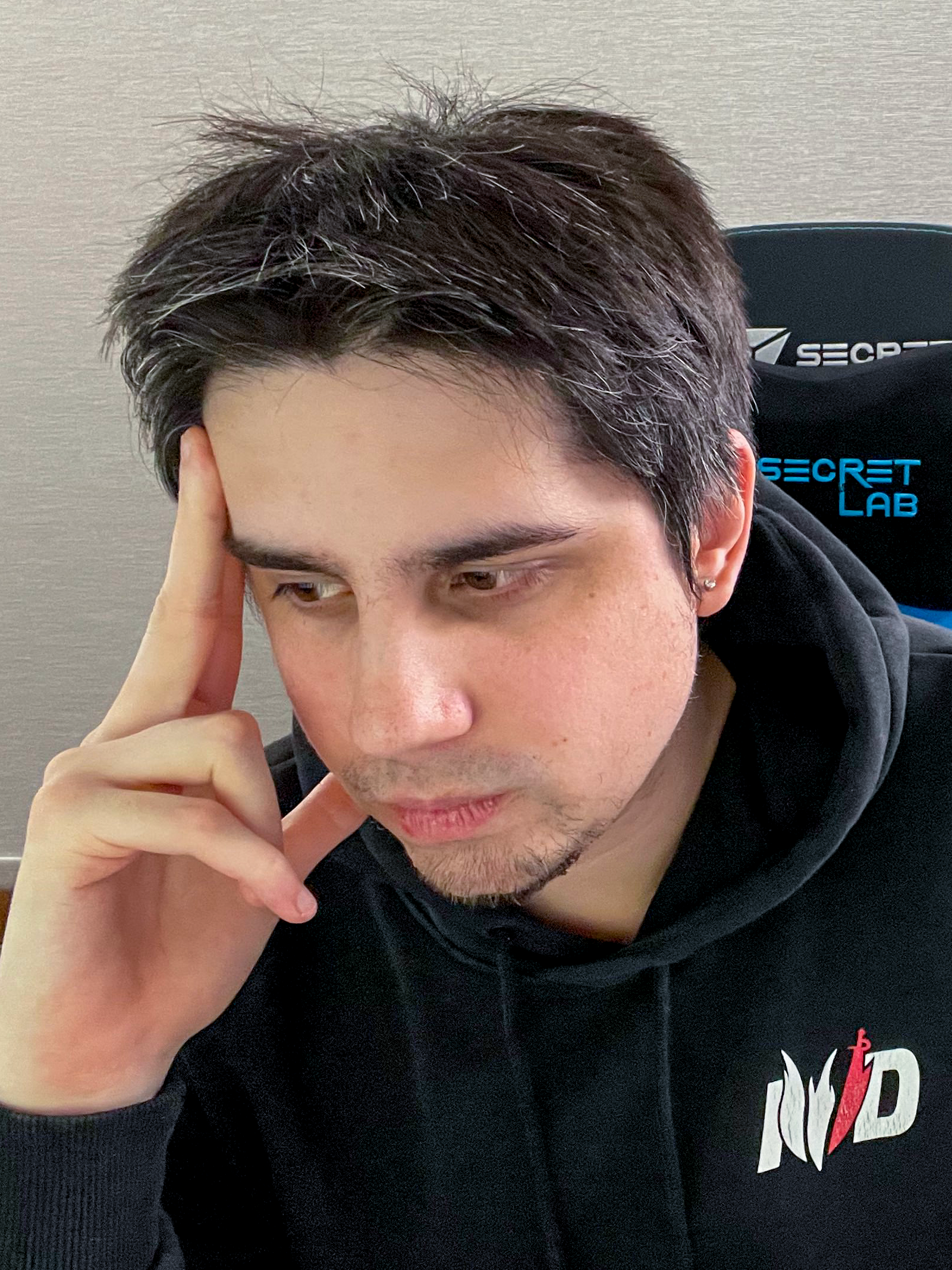
- IWDominate in 2023

Personal information
- Name: Christian Rivera
- Born: August 13, 1990 (age 36); New York City
- Nationality: American

Current team
- Team: Cloud 9
- Role: Coach
- Game: League of Legends
- League: League of Legends Championship Series

Career information
- Playing career: 2011–2016
- Role: Jungle

Team history
- 2011–2012: compLexity Gaming
- 2012: Dignitas
- 2013: Team Curse Academy
- 2013–2015: Team Curse
- 2015: Team Liquid

Career highlights and awards
- 1x NALCS regular season winner (2015 Summer); 1x IEM World Championship runner-up (Season 6)
- Sports commentary career
- Sport: Esports
- Employer: Riot Games (2021)

Twitch information
- Channel: IWDominate
- Years active: 2013–present
- Genre: Gaming
- Followers: 901,000

YouTube information
- Channel: IWDominate
- Genre: Gaming
- Subscribers: 439,000
- Views: 414,445,883
- Last updated: February 8, 2026

Christian Rivera (born August 13, 1990), better known as IWDominate, IWillDominate, IWD or Dom) is an American live streamer, YouTuber and podcaster. Rivera is currently the Head Coach for Cloud9's League of Legends team. Rivera previously competed as a professional League of Legends player in the LCS for Team Liquid, Team Curse, Dignitas and compLexity Gaming. Rivera was previously a co-owner of The Ruddy Sack, a professional team in the Nordic scene.

Known for co-streaming major professional League of Legends regional and international competitions, Rivera is a prominent streamer in the game's community. He is primarily known for his gameplay analysis and experience in the League of Legends esports scene.

On the livestreaming platform Twitch, Rivera operates ones of the most watched channels on the League of Legends category and consistently ranks as one of the top LCS co-streamers, competing in viewership with the official broadcast and Caedrel. Rivera has also been as a caster for the Chinese League of Legends Pro League.

== Early life ==
Rivera was born on August 13, 1990 in New York City. After his family moved to Florida when he was 5, he developed an obsession with videogames, starting with Donkey Kong and Super Mario, before moving on to real-time-strategy games such as Warcraft III. He also played tennis and baseball, competing in the United States Tennis Association and playing in the regional Florida leagues for baseball.

He started playing League of Legends after watching the 2010 World Cyber Games, where he was "instantly drawn to it", quickly downloading it and finding it easy, reaching rank one within six months of playing.

Rivera enrolled at the University of Miami, but after his sophomore year of college ended in 2011, he decided to drop out and pursue his professional career at 20 years old.

== Professional career ==
=== Early career ===
After a brief stint with amateur team Haters Make Us Famous, IWDominate began his professional career in 2011, joining CompLexity Gaming as their jungler until the end of the year. In January 2012, he signed with Team Dignitas, replacing Joshua "Jatt" Leesman. With Dignitas, he helped the team qualify for the Season 2 World Championship.

=== Suspension ===
IWDominate's tenure at Dignitas was cut short due to repeated in-game misconduct. On December 5, 2012, Riot Games issued a one-year LCS suspension and permanently banned all of IWDominate's League accounts for toxic behavior, citing multiple Tribunal cases and consistently high rankings for verbal abuse. During his suspension, Rivera created a new account named “IWDomínate” and climbed to 2,200 Elo while streaming on Twitch. IWDominate developed a "much-improved attitude" during this period.

=== Team Curse/Team Liquid ===
In mid-2013, IWDominate joined Team Curse's academy team in the Challenger Series, later serving as coach/analyst for the main roster. His LCS ban concluded in November 2013, soon afterwards he officially joined Team Curse as their starting jungler. In early 2015, Team Curse rebranded to Team Liquid following acquisition. IWDominate became team captain in the Summer Split, leading Team Liquid to a 13–5 regular-season record. He was named to the 2015 Summer Split Second All-Pro Team. Though the team performed strongly in regular season, they failed to qualify for the World Championship through playoffs and qualifiers.

== Retirement and coaching career ==
In early 2016, IWDominate briefly returned to the Team Liquid starting lineup for the Spring Split, but after just one game he announced his retirement from professional play. He cited a desire to move into coaching and content creation. Team Liquid immediately promoted young jungler Joshua "Dardoch" Hartnett as his replacement. IWDominate remained with Liquid as a positional coach for Dardoch and also appeared occasionally on the analyst desk for the LCS.

In 2025, IWDominate acted as a consultant for Cloud9. During the 2025/2026 offseason, it was announced that IWDominate would be working with Cloud9 directly as part of their 2026 coaching staff. On June 26, 2026, it was announced that IWDominate was promoted to the role of Head Coach.

== Content career ==
=== Content creation ===
After formally retiring, he became a full-time streamer and content creator. He continued with Team Liquid’s organization for several years, building a personal Twitch following, achieving nearly 800,000 followers by 2020 and producing game-analysis videos and co-streams of the LCS.

In August 2020, Cloud9 announced that Rivera would leave Team Liquid to join Cloud9 as a League of Legends content creator. During his tenure he continued to stream full-time, co-streaming League Championship Series broadcasts and other tournaments. Rivera remained with Cloud9 until December 2022, where they parted ways on good terms.

Rivera remains a prominent figure in the North American League community. He continues to co-stream competitive games from leagues around the world, including the LCK, LTA, LPL and LEC. He also occasionally provides analysis for Riot Games and third-party broadcasts.

=== The Ruddy Sack ===
Rebranded logo of The Ruddy Sack

In early 2025, Rivera expanded into team ownership, becoming co-owner of an NLC (Northern League of Legends Championship) slot alongside popular content creators Jakob 'YamatoCannon' Mebdi and Jake 'DonJake' Morley for the rebranded The Ruddy Sack (formerly Ruddy Esports). The expanded team featured high-profile players such as Luka 'Perkz' Perković, Marcin 'Jankos' Jankowski, Adam 'LIDER' Ilyasov, Humzh 'Humzh' Aborati, and Morgan 'Hustlin' Granberg, with YamatoCannon serving as Head Coach. The team aimed at providing a different style of content creation and humor, including custom 3D environments on Rivera's stream, akin to those ran by official broadcasts during the COVID-19 lockdowns, and streaming scrims akin to Los Ratones, who they competed against. The rebrand, logo and ownership changes were announced in January 2025, alongside a UK-based watch party at the Red Bull Gaming Sphere.

During the 2025 NLC Winter playoffs, The Ruddy Sack underperformed expectations and lost a close upper-bracket match to Bulldog Esports and were eliminated after a best-of-five series. Rivera acknowledged the poor performance on stream, calling for roster changes and strategic restructuring, and stated that the ownership remained committed to improving team cohesion and the viewing experience moving forward.

For the 2025 NLC Spring split, the roster would field a more traditional 'Ruddy' roster with less popular streamers. They would perform well, securing the team a slot at the Season Finals in Copenhagen, where the team placed 3rd after being eliminated 0-3 by Los Ratones. After the split concluded, DonJake announced on The Ruddy Sack's account on X/Twitter that Ruddy Esports and The Sack had parted ways on good terms, citing financial issues and uncertainty around the health of streamer teams.

== Controversies ==
=== 2012 suspension ===
Throughout his streaming career, Rivera has been known for an outspoken and sometimes abrasive personality. His 2012 suspension is the most significant, when Riot Games announced that he would be suspended from all LCS competition for one year and that all of his League of Legends accounts would be permanently banned. Riot’s announcement cited Rivera’s “persistent record” of verbal abuse and offensive language, noting he had been brought before the Tribunal nine times (with eight punishments) and was among the worst 0.7% of North American players for harassment. Dignitas subsequently removed him from their roster. Denied the LCS for a year, Rivera took the suspension as a chance to reform. In late 2012 he climbed the ranked ladder to 2200 Elo, and began streaming on Twitch to demonstrate improved behavior.
