= College Navigator =

Consumer site by the U.S. government

College Navigator is a consumer tool created by the US Department of Education and its National Center for Education Statistics so that people can evaluate US colleges that receive Title IV funds. College Navigator includes institutional data on programs offered, retention and graduation rates, prices, aid available, degrees awarded, campus safety, student loan defaults and accreditation.
