= Bunny FuFuu =

American esports player

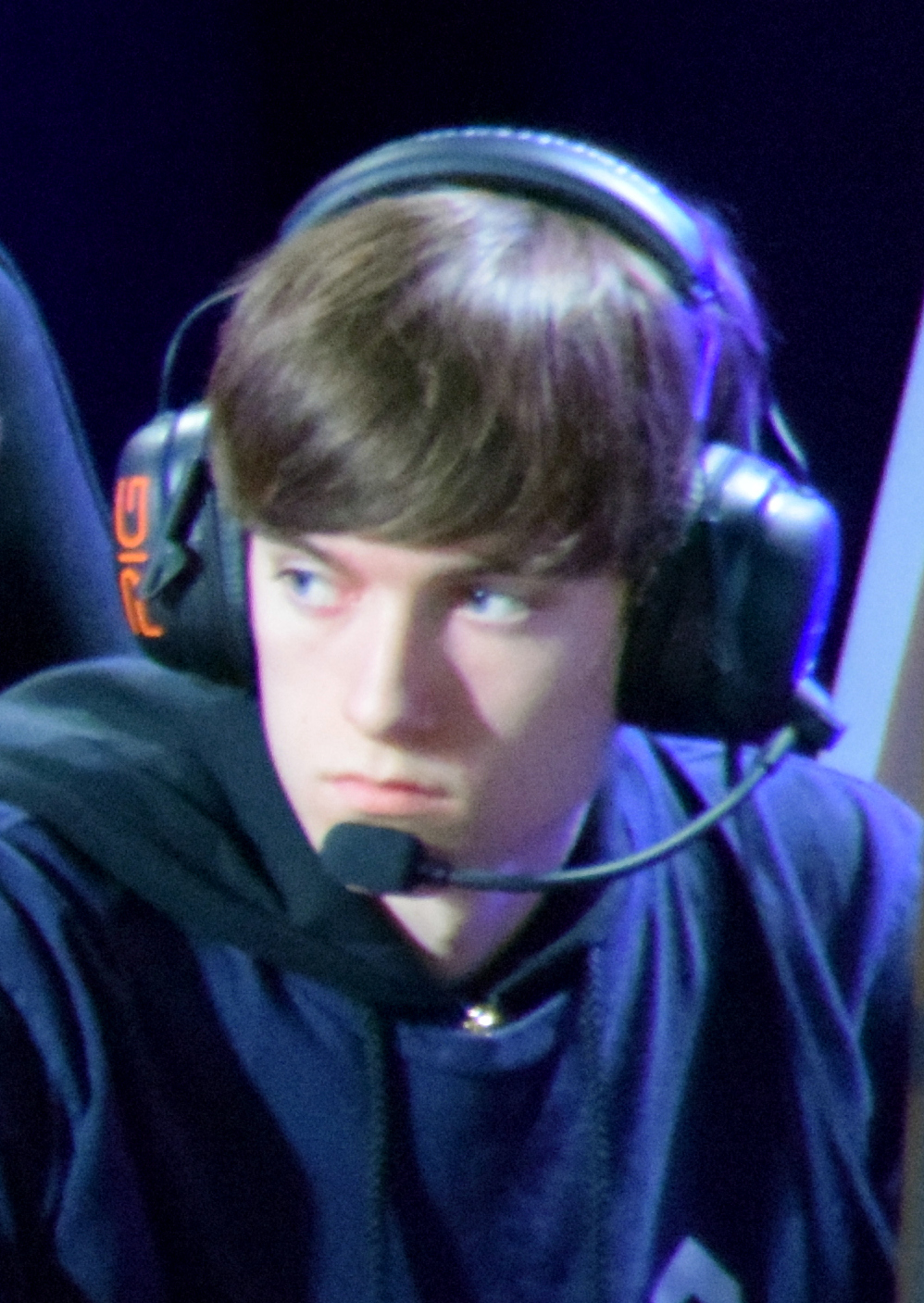
- Kurylo in 2015

Personal information
- Name: Michael Kurylo
- Nationality: American

Career information
- Games: League of Legends
- Role: Support

Team history
- 2014: Team Curse
- 2014–2015: Curse Academy
- 2015: Gravity Gaming
- 2016: Cloud9

Michael Kurylo, better known as Bunny FuFuu, is an American League of Legends player who was a streamer for Cloud9 and who most recently played substitute support for Cloud9 of the North American League of Legends Championship Series (NA LCS). He joined C9 on November 18, 2015. On July 17, 2016, Bunny FuFuu announced that he would be stepping down from C9's roster in order to become a full-time streamer.

== Tournament results ==
=== Curse Academy ===
- 3rd — 2014 NA Challenger Series Summer #1
- 2nd — 2014 NA Challenger Series Summer Playoffs
- 2nd — 2014 NA Challenger Series Summer Playoffs

=== Gravity Gaming ===
- 7th-8th — 2015 Spring NA LCS
- 7th-8th — 2015 Summer NA LCS

=== Cloud9 ===
- 3rd — 2016 NA LCS Spring Split
- 5-6th —2016 NA LCS Spring Playoffs
- 3rd — 2016 NA LCS Summer regular season
- 2nd — 2016 NA LCS Summer playoffs
