= Li Xian =

Li Xian may refer to:

- Li Xian (Northern Zhou general) (502-569)
- Emperor Zhongzong of Tang (656–710), personal name Li Xian (李顯)
- Emperor Mozhu of Western Xia (r. 1226–1227), personal name Li Xian (李睍)
- Prince Zhanghuai (653–684), personal name Li Xian (李賢), Tang dynasty prince
- Li Chengqi (679–742), or Li Xian (李憲), Tang dynasty prince, son of Emperor Ruizong
- Li Xian (chancellor) (709–766; 李峴), Tang dynasty official
- Li Xian (Ming dynasty) (1408–1466; 李賢), Ming dynasty mandarin
- Li Xian (Xin dynasty) (李憲; died 30 AD), Xin dynasty general
- Li Xian (actor) (born 1991), Chinese actor

== Places ==
- Li County (disambiguation), also known as Li Xian
