= John Ham =

Jo(h)n Ham(m) may refer to:

- John Ham, MP for New Shoreham in 1433
- John Ham, co-founder of Ustream
- John Ham (pirate) (fl. 1699–1720), pirate and privateer in the Caribbean
- John E. Hamm (1776–1864), American colonel, doctor and politician
- John Hamm (1938–2026), Canadian physician and politician
- Jon Hamm (born 1971), American actor, director and producer
- Jonathan Hamm (born 1985), former amateur boxer, actor, football player and current mixed martial artist
