= Liu Xian =

Liu Xian may refer to:

- Liu Xian (Prince of Wu) (劉賢), Western Han dynasty prince, son of Liu Pi (劉濞).
- Liu Xian (Prince of Zichuan) (劉賢; died 154), Western Han dynasty prince, son of Liu Fei (劉肥).
- Liu Xian (Prince of Jiaodong) (劉賢), Western Han dynasty prince, son of Liu Ji (劉寄).
- Liu Xian (Prince of Chen) (劉羨; died 97), Eastern Han dynasty prince, son of Emperor Ming.
- Liu Xian (Prince of Donghai) (劉羨), Eastern Han dynasty prince.
- Liu Xian (Later Zhao) (劉顯); Later Zhao military general and emperor during the Sixteen Kingdoms period.
- Liu Xian (劉賢), a fictional character in the historical novel Romance of the Three Kingdoms. See List of fictional people of the Three Kingdoms#Chapter 52.
