= Si Xingjian =

Chinese paleobotanist

Si Xingjian (Chinese: 斯行健, 1901–1964) was a Chinese paleobotanist. He is considered among the first generation of Chinese paleontologists.

Born in 1901, Si was from Zhuji, Zhejiang. He was a professor at Tsinghua University and Peking University. Si died in 1964.
