= Dyrus =

American professional esports player

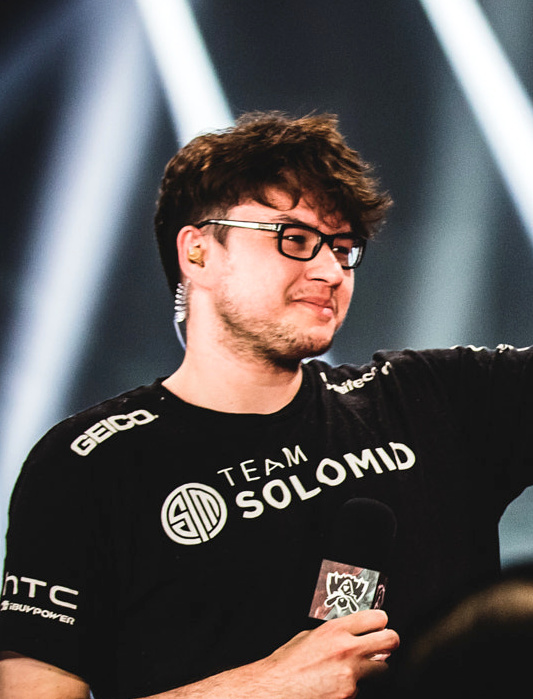
- Hill in 2015

Personal information
- Name: Marcus Hill
- Born: March 30, 1992 (age 34)
- Nationality: American

Career information
- Game: League of Legends
- Playing career: 2010–2015, 2017
- Role: Top laner

Team history
- 2010: All or Nothing
- 2010–2012: Epik Gamer
- 2012–2015: Team SoloMid
- 2017: Delta Fox

Career highlights and awards
- 3× NA LCS champion; WCG 2011 champion; IEM champion (2015)

Marcus Hill (born March 30, 1992), better known as Dyrus, is an American Twitch streamer and former professional player of the multiplayer online battle arena (MOBA) game League of Legends. Dyrus was the top laner for Team SoloMid (TSM) for most of his professional League of Legends career. With TSM, he won several LCS titles and appeared at several World Championships. He retired from professional play after the 2015 World Championship, although he briefly returned to play in 2017.

== Career ==
Dyrus began playing League of Legends in its beta phase. Dyrus' favorite champion is Singed, with which he acquired rank 1 in the beta phase. Dyrus' career started out as a support for one of the first competitive teams in the League of Legends professional scene, All or Nothing. Following the disbandment of All or Nothing, Dyrus joined Epik Gamer as their top laner. Dyrus gained exposure following his decision to start streaming on Twitch because of his unique play, interesting personality, and success of Epik Gamer at LAN tournaments. Dyrus later moved in into the gaming house of New York-based Team SoloMid (TSM) to pursue a full-time gaming career while still playing for Epik Gamer.

Following the resignation of TheRainMan from TSM, Dyrus offered himself as RainMan's replacement. Prior to his signing, Dyrus had already been living in the TSM gaming house. With Dyrus' former team's blessing, Dyrus resigned from Epik Gamer and has been playing as the top laner for Team SoloMid.

Dyrus and teammate Xpecial were selected for North American team at the May 2013 all-star League of Legends tournament in Shanghai.

Dyrus and TSM won the 2014 Spring split and the 2014 Summer split. In the 2015 Spring NA LCS, Dyrus helped TSM win the regular season and the playoffs. Team SoloMid was the winner of the Intel Extreme Masters Season IX Katowice World Finals. They defeated Team WE 3 to 0 in the finals.

Winning the 2015 Spring LCS granted them one of six invitations to the 2015 Mid-Season Invitational in the inaugural year for the event. TSM finished in 5th place at the event. In the summer split, TSM finished in 2nd place being defeated by Counter Logic Gaming in the playoffs.

At the 2015 League of Legends World Championship, TSM was placed in Group D which consisted of Origen, LGD Gaming, and KT Rolster known as the "Group of Death". TSM finished fourth place in its group and was unable to progress further. After TSM faced their last game at the tournament against LGD, Dyrus retired and was given a standing ovation for his contribution to TSM.

Hill returned to professional play in June 2017, joining Echo Fox's Challenger team Delta Fox to compete in the North America Challenger Series (NA CS). The team disbanded competitively after the NA CS league ended later in the year.

== Personal life ==
Marcus Hill was born on March 30, 1992, and grew up in Honolulu, Hawaii. His mother is Chinese-American while his father is of British-American descent. Dyrus went into professional League of Legends despite the wishes of his father, Mark Hill, who wanted him to work for the family plumbing business. On June 29, 2016, Dyrus announced his relationship with Emiru, a Twitch streamer. In November 2020 they officially broke up.

== Notable tournament placements ==
=== 2011 ===
2011
Date	Location	Event	Result	Placement
2011-11-20	Busan, South Korea	2011 World Cyber Games Grand Finals	Chicks Dig Elo 2 : 1 exGameburg Team	1st
2011-11-20	Providence, Rhode Island, U.S.	2011 MLG Providence	Epik Gamer 2 : 4 Team SoloMid	2nd
2011-10-09	Atlantic City, New Jersey, U.S.	IGN ProLeague Season 3 - Atlantic City	Epik Gamer 1 : 2 Team Dignitas	2nd
2011-09-24	online	Sound Blaster Nations Championship	Team USA 0 : 2 Team Canada	2nd
2011-08-27	Raleigh, U.S.	2011 MLG Pro Circuit	Epik Gamer 0 : 2 Counter Logic Gaming	2nd

=== 2012 ===
2012
Date	Location	Event	Result	Placement
2012-12-09	online	SoloMid Series - Week 6	Team SoloMid 2 : 1 Team Curse	1st
2012-10-28	online	SoloMid Series - Week 2	Team SoloMid 2 : 0 Orbit Gaming	1st
2012-10-21	online	SoloMid Series - Week 1	Team SoloMid 2 : 1 Orbit Gaming	1st
2012-09-23	online	Solomid NA Invitational 10	Team SoloMid 0 : 2 Monomaniac eSports	2nd
2012-09-10	online	Solomid NA Invitational 8	Team SoloMid win : forfeit Team Curse	1st
2012-09-02	Los Angeles, U.S.	Season 2 North American Regional Finals	Team SoloMid 2 : 0 Team Dignitas	1st
2012-08-19	online	Solomid NA Invitational 7	Team SoloMid 1 : 2 Team Curse	2nd
2012-08-12	San Francisco, California, U.S.	IPL Face Off: San Francisco Showdown	Team SoloMid 3 : 0 Team Curse	1st
2012-08-08	online	Solomid NA Invitational 6	Team SoloMid 2 : 0 mTw North America	1st
2012-08-05	New York City, New York, U.S.	2012 MLG Pro Circuit/Summer/Arena	Team SoloMid 0 : 2 Azubu Blaze	2nd
2012-06-17	Pomona, California, U.S.	GIGABYTE Esports LAN	Team SoloMid 2 : 0 CLG Black	1st
2012-06-10	Anaheim, California, U.S.	2012 MLG Pro Circuit/Spring	Team SoloMid 2 : 1 Counter Logic Gaming	1st
2012-06-03	online/offline	Reign of Gaming International Invitational	Team SoloMid 2 : 1 Epik Gamer	1st
2012-05-28	online	Solomid NA Tournament Circuit	Team SoloMid 4 : 2 Team Dynamic	1st
2012-04-08	Las Vegas, Nevada, U.S.	IGN ProLeague Season 4 - Las Vegas	Team SoloMid 2 : 0 Counter Logic Gaming	1st
2012-04-01	online	Leaguecraft ggClassic	Team SoloMid 2 : 0 4 Not Fire	1st
2012-03-16	online	Fatal1ty Gaming Gear League of Legends Tournament	Team SoloMid 2 : 1 Just Your Average Joes	1st

=== 2013 ===
2013
Date	Location	Event	Result	Placement
2013-09-02	Seattle, U.S.	LCS North America Season 3 Summer Playoffs	Team SoloMid 0 : 3 Cloud9	2nd
2013-04-28	Los Angeles, U.S.	LCS North America Season 3 Spring Playoffs	Team SoloMid 3 : 2 Team Coast	1st

=== 2014 ===
2014
Date	Location	Event	Result	Placement
2014	Los Angeles, California, U.S.	LCS North America Season 4 Spring Season		2nd
2014-04-20	Los Angeles, California, U.S.	LCS North America Season 4 Spring Playoffs	Team SoloMid 0 : 3 Cloud9	2nd
2014-09-01	Seattle, Washington, U.S.	LCS North America Season 4 Summer Playoffs	Team SoloMid 3 : 2 Cloud9	1st

=== 2015 ===
2015
Date	Location	Event	Result	Placement
2015-04-20	Los Angeles, U.S.	NA LCS 2015 Spring Season		1st
2015-04-20	Los Angeles, U.S.	NA LCS 2015 Spring Playoffs	Team SoloMid 3 : 0 Cloud9	1st
