= Santorin (gamer) =

Danish League of Legends player

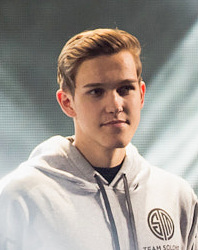
- Larsen in 2015

Personal information
- Name: Lucas Tao Kilmer Larsen
- Nationality: Danish

Current team
- Team: Team Liquid
- Role: Jungler
- Game: League of Legends
- League: LCS

Team history
- 2014: Team Coast
- 2015: Team SoloMid
- 2016: Huma
- 2016: NRG Esports
- 2017: Gold Coin United
- 2018: H2k Gaming
- 2018–2020: FlyQuest
- 2021–present: Team Liquid

Career highlights and awards
- NA LCS champion (2015 Spring)

Lucas Tao Kilmer Larsen, better known as Santorin, is a Danish professional League of Legends player who is the jungler for Team Liquid of the League of Legends Championship Series (LCS). He has also played for Team Coast, Team SoloMid, Team Ember and Team Huma. Santorin joined TSM in November 2014. He won the 2015 Spring NA LCS with TSM. On December 14, 2015, he was announced for Team Huma's North American League of Legends Challenger Series. On February 26, 2016, he was sold to Ember due to Huma's financial issues.

After a 9th place regular season finish in the 2016 Summer NA LCS, and subsequent relegation match losses, Santorin left NRG.

== Tournament results ==
=== Team SoloMid ===
- 1st — 2015 Spring NA LCS
- 2nd — 2015 Summer NA LCS

=== NRG Esports ===
- 5th — 2016 Spring NA LCS regular season
- 5-6th — 2016 Spring NA LCS playoffs
- 9th — 2016 NA LCS Summer regular season
- lost — 2017 Spring NA LCS promotion
