= Du Xian =

Du Xian may refer to:

- Du Xian (Tang dynasty) (died 740), official and general of the Chinese Tang dynasty
- Du Xian (news anchor) (born 1954), Chinese news anchor
