= Prince Xian =

Prince Xian may refer to either of the following Qing dynasty princely peerages:

- Prince Su (肅親王), created in 1636, renamed to Prince Xian (顯親王) in 1651
- Prince Xian (諴) (諴親王), created in 1733
