= Team Coast (esports) =

Former American esports organization

- Divisions: League of Legends; Dota 2 Smite; Hearthstone
- Founded: January 4, 2013
- Folded: October 14, 2016
- Team history: Good Game University (2013); Team Coast (2013–2016)
- Based in: Riverside, California
- Location: United States
- Partners: Azubu; CyberPowerPC; LOL-CLASS
- Website: teamcoast.net

Team Coast was an American esports organization and League of Legends website. It was originally formed under the name Good Game University on January 4, 2013, by the former roster of Team Dynamic following their departure from the parent organization. They named themselves Good Game University before changing their name to Team Coast on June 1, 2013. Their first offline tournament was the League of Legends Season 3 North American qualifiers where they qualified for a spot in the Season 3 League of Legends Championship Series (LCS).

== League of Legends ==
=== 2013 ===
On January 4, Good Game University was founded by the former roster of Team Dynamic following their departure from the parent multi-gaming organization. ZionSpartan, NintendudeX, DontMashMe, Shiphtur, I am Anjo, and Pixel joined the team.

Team Dynamic, composed of ZionSpartan, NintendudeX, DontMashMe, Shiphtur, I am Anjo, and Pixel, form Good Game University after leaving their parent organization. In January 2013, Good Game University competed in the North American LCS Qualifier. In the group stage, Good Game University beat Epik Gamer and Team TowerDiveTV, while dropping one game to Team FeaR. By winning those two games, GGU advanced to day two of the event where they would defeat Dirtnap Gaming and secure their spot in the Spring Split of the NA LCS. On January 24, Diamond joined. February 4, Fat joined. February 11, Luthman joined. February 13, BloodWater joined. I am Anjo become a sub. February 27, Jintae joins.

Shiphtur, GGU's mid lane player, was unable to play in the Spring LCS due to Visa issues. With substitute player Jintae, GGU opened the season poorly, going 2–12 with a seven-game losing streak. However, with the acquisition of Daydreamin, GGU turned their season around and finished sixth at 11–17 in the Spring Split, securing their spot in the NA LCS Spring Playoffs. In the quarterfinals of the playoffs, GGU defeated Dignitas 2–1, advancing them to the semifinals, where they beat Team Curse 2–1. With those two victories under their belt, GGU advanced to the finals, where they faced off against Team SoloMid (TSM). Although TSM won 3–2, Good Game University secured their spot in the NA LCS Summer Season.

On April 3, BloodWater leaves. After finishing the spring split at second place in the playoffs, the team renamed to Team Coast, their new sponsor. Additionally, ex-Curse Gaming support player Elementz became their coach. In early August Shiphtur's visa issues were resolved when he was granted a P visa, and he was able to play mid for Team Coast in the summer LCS season, replacing Jintae.

Team Coast began the season tied for second during Week One, but thanks to a seven-game losing streak at the end of the split, Coast had to settle for seventh with a record of 9–19. This meant they would be sent to relegation matches in December to win back their spot into the league for the Season 4 Spring Promotion. On June 1, Good Game University became Team Coast. Elementz joined as a coach. On June 18, Raìna joins. On June 25, CyberPowerPC became a sponsor of the team. July 2, Corsair sponsors Team Coast. August 19, LoL-Class sponsors Team Coast. October 28, DontMashMe leaves. November 26, WizFujiiN joins. December 12, coach Elementz leaves.

In the offseason, Team Coast was invited to some amateur scene events, winning ggLA Challenger Arena 5 and then earning a spot onto the new competitive league, North American Challenger League (NACL). During the first week of the NACL, on October 8, 2013, DontMashMe announced that he had stepped down from his starter AD position. On November 26, WizFujiiN joined as the new starting AD.

In December, Coast revealed that they would compete with challenger team The Walking Zed for a spot in the Season 4 Spring Split North American LCS at the Spring Promotion tournament. There, Coast would prevail 3-2 and receive a spot in their third LCS split, the Season 4 Spring Split.

=== 2014 ===
On January 5, Alex "Zaroxy" Penn joined as a coach/analyst. January 25, FEENIX sponsored Team Coast, while Corsair dropped their sponsorship. April 19, 6th place at2014 NA LCS Spring Playoffs May 2, Shiphtur and ZionSpartan leave. May 13, Santorin joins Team Coast as the starting jungler while NintendudeX moves to the sub position. June 9, new roster is announced, Dontmashme and Sheep join while Daydreamin and WizFujiiN moves to sub. Chaox joins as a coach. Team Coast finished sixth at the 2014 NA LCS Spring Playoffs after losing 2–0 to CLG and then 2–1 to Team Dignitas. The team was then relegated to the Riot League Championship Series/North America/2014 Season/Summer Promotion|2014 Summer Promotion Tournament, along with XDG Gaming and Evil Geniuses. Despite being favorited to win its series against compLexity.Black, having the best spring season record of the three teams facing relegation, and facing arguably the weakest of the three competing challenger teams, Coast lost 1-3 and with it lost its place in the LCS. Mid laner Shiphtur and top laner ZionSpartan quickly departed the team for warmer waters with Team Dignitas, while jungler NintendudeX stepped down to a substitute position.

In June, Coast announced a new starting roster, consisting mainly of experienced free agents. AD carry Dontmashme rejoined the team with renewed LCS aspirations, replacing WizFujiiN. Their new support player Sheep, had some LCS experience with XDG Gaming, along with mid laner Goldenglue with Team Dignitas and top laner Rhux with Team Curse. The only player without LCS experience, jungler Santorin, had been a substitute for top-ranked challenger team Cloud9 Eclipse in Europe. Lastly, Coast hired on Chaox, Season 2 star of Team SoloMid, as a coach.

As a recently relegated team, Coast was entered to compete in the 2014 NA Challenger Series (NACS). With series against Team Green Forest, Curse Academy, and Team LoLPro, Coast took first place with an overall 6–1 record. In July, in the 2014 Summer NACS, Coast again took first with series wins against Denial eSports, Team 8, and Curse Academy, with an undefeated 6–0 sweep. With two NACS titles at their back, Coast entered the August playoffs with high hopes and a first round bye, only to be swept in the semifinals by Team 8. Without letting their negative momentum continue, Coast defeated Team LoLPro in the third place match and took home US$8,000.

July 22, Chaox steps down as the team's Coach. August 30, Rhux and goldenglue were moved to sub positions. September 3, Miracle and Ringer joins. September 11, Sheep leaves Team Coast. September 27, LOD and Cris join. September 30, wewillfailer joined as Coach. October 3, Elementz comes back as Coach. October 27, Impaler and Jesiz join, while LOD and Santorin leave.

=== 2015 ===
On February 17, Mancloud joins as starting Mid laner, while Jesiz moved to sub. March 13, Sheep and Impaler left, and KonKwon joined. WelcomeToHeaven moved to starting jungler. May 2, mancloud left the team. Coast finished the 2015 Spring LCS in last place. The Daily Dot reported that a source close to the team revealed the team would disband rather than be relegated to the Challenger Series. However the team immediately responded on their Twitter account that this was not true.

In November, it was announced that Team Coast's LCS spot had been sold to a new esports organization called NRG Esports.

== See also ==
- Apex Gaming
