= Si (surname) =

Si is the pinyin romanization of a number of distinct Chinese surnames that are written with different characters in Chinese. Depending on the character, it may be spelled Sī, Sí, Sǐ, or Sì when tone diacritics are used. In Wade–Giles they are romanized as Ssu. Languages using the Latin alphabet do not distinguish among the different Chinese surnames, rendering them all as Si.

== Surnames romanized as Si ==
- Si (surname 姒)
- Si (surname 斯)
- Si (surname 司)
