= Wu Xian =

Wu Xian or Wuxian may refer to:

== Places ==
- Wu County (Wu Xian), later Wuxian City, a former county and county-level city of Suzhou, Jiangsu
- Suzhou, Jiangsu itself, also formerly called Wu County (Wu Xian)

== People ==
- Wu Xian (Shang dynasty), ancient Chinese astronomer of the Shang Dynasty
- Emperor Zhongzong of Tang (656–710), also known as Wu Xian
- Hsien Wu or Wu Xian (1893–1959), Chinese-American scientist
- Wu Xian (singer) (born 1982; also known as Ding Dang), Chinese singer
- Wu Xian (politician) (吴宪), Vice Governor of Zhejiang Province
