= List of League Championship Series (esports) teams =

This is a list of teams that compete in the League of Legends Championship Series (LCS), (Note: Formerly known as the North American League of Legends Championship Series (NA LCS) from its inception in Spring 2013 to Spring 2019.) the top level of professional League of Legends in North America. This also includes the teams that competed in the League of Legends Championship of The Americas (LTA) North Conference, or LTA North, which briefly replaced the LCS in 2025.

== All teams ==
Teams marked in bold are currently part of the LCS. Teams marked in italics were in the LTA North for 2025, while those marked in bold and italics were part of the LTA North and currently part of the LCS.

- 100 Thieves (Spring 2018 – Summer 2024) (Note: Was a member of the LTA North in 2025, but left after the 2025 season.)
- Apex Gaming (Summer 2016) (Note: Rebranded to Team Dignitas after both were bought by the Philadelphia 76ers.)
- **Cloud9** (Summer 2013 – Summer 2024; Split 1 2026 – present)
- Clutch Gaming (Spring 2018 – Spring 2020)
- Team Coast (Summer 2013 – Summer 2015) (Note: Sold their spot to NRG Esports.)
- compLexity Gaming (Spring 2013, Summer 2014)
- Counter Logic Gaming (Spring 2013 – Spring 2023)
- Team Curse (Spring 2013 – Summer 2014) (Note: Became a part of Team Liquid prior to Spring 2015.)
- Dignitas (Spring 2013 – Spring 2016, Spring 2017 – Summer 2017; Summer 2020 – Summer 2024; Lock-In 2026 – Summer 2026)
- Team Dragon Knights (Summer 2015)
- Echo Fox (Spring 2016 – Summer 2019)
- Enemy eSports (Summer 2015)
- Team Envy (Summer 2016 – Summer 2017)
- Evil Geniuses (Spring 2014 – Summer 2014; Summer 2020-Summer 2023) (Note: Played in EU LCS from Spring to Summer 2013; prior to Spring 2015, their LoL team rebranded to Winterfox.)
- **FlyQuest** (Spring 2017 – Summer 2024; Split 1 2026 – present)
- Golden Guardians (Spring 2018 – Summer 2023)
- Good Game University (Spring 2013) (Note: Rebranded to Team Coast prior to Summer 2013.)
- Gravity Gaming (Spring 2015 – Summer 2015) (Note: Curse Academy rebranded upon promotion to LCS.)
- Immortals (Spring 2016 – Summer 2017; Summer 2020 – Summer 2024)
- Team Impulse (Spring 2015 – Spring 2016) (Note: Rebranded from LMQ prior to Spring 2016.)
- **Team Liquid** (Spring 2015 – Summer 2024; Split 1 2026 – present) (Note: Team Curse organization merged with Team Liquid prior to Spring 2015.)
- **LYON** (Split 1 2026 – present) (Note: Formed as a merger between Liga Latinoamérica (LLA) teams Rainbow7 and Six Karma for the 2025 LTA season; the team moved to the LCS after the LTA's discontinuation.)
- LMQ (Summer 2014) (Note: Moved from the LPL and rebranded as Team Impulse prior to Spring 2016.)
- Team MRN (Spring 2013)
- NRG Esports (Spring 2016 – Summer 2016; Summer 2023 – Summer 2024)
- **OpTic Gaming** (Spring 2018 – Summer 2019; Split 1 2027 – present)
- Renegades (Summer 2015 – Spring 2016)
- **Sentinels** (Summer 2016 – Summer 2017 (as Phoenix1); Split 1 2026 – present)
- **Shopify Rebellion** (Spring 2024 – Summer 2024; Split 1 2026 – present)
- Team SoloMid (Spring 2013 – Summer 2023) (Note: Sold their spot to Shopify Rebellion.)
- Team 8 (Spring 2015 – Summer 2015) (Note: Spot sold to Immortals prior to Spring 2016.)
- Velocity eSports (Summer 2013)
- Team Vulcun (Spring 2013 – Summer 2013)
- Winterfox (Spring 2015) (Note: Rebranded from Evil Geniuses prior to Spring 2015.)
- XDG Gaming (Spring 2014)

== Prior to franchising ==
=== 2013 Spring ===
- Team SoloMid
- Team Curse
- Team Dignitas
- Counter Logic Gaming
- Team Vulcun
- Good Game University
- Team MRN
- compLexity Gaming

=== 2013 Summer ===
- Cloud9
- Team Vulcun
- Team SoloMid
- Team Curse
- Team Dignitas
- Counter Logic Gaming
- Team Coast
- Velocity eSports

=== 2014 Spring ===
- Cloud9
- Team SoloMid
- Counter Logic Gaming
- Team Dignitas
- Team Curse
- Team Coast
- Evil Geniuses
- XDG Gaming

=== 2014 Summer ===
- Cloud9
- LMQ
- Team SoloMid
- Team Curse
- Counter Logic Gaming
- Team Dignitas
- Evil Geniuses
- compLexity Gaming

=== 2015 Spring ===
- Team SoloMid
- Cloud9
- Counter Logic Gaming
- Team Impulse
- Gravity Gaming
- Team Liquid
- Team 8
- Winterfox
- Team Dignitas
- Team Coast

=== 2015 Summer ===
- Team Liquid
- Counter Logic Gaming
- Team Impulse
- Gravity Gaming
- Team SoloMid
- Team Dignitas
- Cloud9
- Team 8
- Enemy eSports
- Team Dragon Knights

=== 2016 Spring ===
- Immortals
- Counter Logic Gaming
- Cloud9
- Team Liquid
- NRG Esports
- Team SoloMid
- Echo Fox
- Renegades
- Team Impulse
- Team Dignitas

=== 2016 Summer ===
- Immortals
- Counter Logic Gaming
- Cloud9
- Team Liquid
- NRG Esports
- Team SoloMid
- Echo Fox
- Team Envy
- Phoenix1
- Apex Gaming

=== 2017 Spring ===
- Cloud9
- Counter Logic Gaming
- Echo Fox
- FlyQuest
- Immortals
- Phoenix1
- Team Dignitas
- Team Envy
- Team Liquid
- Team SoloMid

=== 2017 Summer ===
- Cloud9
- Counter Logic Gaming
- Echo Fox
- FlyQuest
- Immortals
- Phoenix1
- Team Dignitas
- Team Envy
- Team Liquid
- Team SoloMid

== Franchise teams ==
=== 2018 Spring – 2019 Summer ===
- 100 Thieves (Cleveland Cavaliers)
- Cloud9
- Clutch Gaming (Houston Rockets)
- Counter Logic Gaming
- Echo Fox
- FlyQuest
- Golden Guardians (Golden State Warriors)
- OpTic Gaming
- Team Liquid
- Team SoloMid

=== 2020 Spring – 2023 Spring ===
- 100 Thieves (Cleveland Cavaliers)
- Cloud9
- Counter Logic Gaming
- Dignitas
- Evil Geniuses
- FlyQuest
- Golden Guardians (Golden State Warriors)
- Immortals
- Team Liquid
- Team SoloMid

=== 2023 Summer ===
- 100 Thieves (Cleveland Cavaliers)
- Cloud9
- Dignitas
- Evil Geniuses
- FlyQuest
- Golden Guardians (Golden State Warriors)
- Immortals
- NRG Esports
- Team Liquid
- Team SoloMid

=== 2024 Spring – 2024 Summer ===
- 100 Thieves (Cleveland Cavaliers)
- Cloud9
- Dignitas
- FlyQuest
- Immortals
- NRG Esports
- Shopify Rebellion
- Team Liquid

=== Split 1 2025 – Split 3 2025 (LTA North) ===
- 100 Thieves (Cleveland Cavaliers) (Note: 100 Thieves was a "provisional guest" team that, while not being able to be relegated, did not have a partnership slot and left after 2025.)
- Cloud9
- Dignitas
- Disguised (Note: Disguised are a guest team that have to earn promotion back into the LCS each season.)
- FlyQuest
- LYON
- Shopify Rebellion
- Team Liquid

=== Lock-In 2026 – Summer 2026 ===
- Cloud9
- Dignitas
- Disguised
- FlyQuest
- LYON
- Sentinels
- Shopify Rebellion
- Team Liquid

=== Lock-In 2027 – present ===
- Cloud9
- Disguised
- FlyQuest
- LYON
- OpTic Gaming (Note: Spot is currently owned by Dignitas, who partnered with OpTic.)
- Sentinels
- Shopify Rebellion
- Team Liquid
