= 2016 NA LCS season =

- League: NA LCS
- Sport: League of Legends
- Duration: January 16 – April 17 (Spring); June 3 – August 28 (Summer)
- Teams: 10
- TV partner: Twitch

Spring
- Champions: Counter Logic Gaming
- Runners-up: Team SoloMid
- Top seed: Immortals
- Season MVP: Kim "Reignover" Yeu-jin (Immortals)

Summer
- Champions: Team SoloMid
- Runners-up: Cloud9
- Top seed: Team SoloMid
- Season MVP: Søren "Bjergsen" Bjerg (Team SoloMid)

Regional finals
- Winner: Cloud9

NA LCS seasons
- ← 2015 2017 →

The 2016 NA LCS season was the fourth year of the North American League of Legends Championship Series. It was divided into spring and summer splits, each consisting of a regular season and playoff stage. Regular season games were played in the Riot Games Studios in Los Angeles, California.

== Format ==
Teams compete in a double round robin tournament over the course of nine weeks during the regular season, with matches being best-of-three. The top six teams from the regular season advanced to the playoff stage, with the top two teams receiving a bye to the semifinals. The seventh place team qualifies for the next split of the LCS but does not participate in playoffs. The bottom three teams play in a promotion/relegation tournament against the top two NA Challenger Series teams. Playoffs were single-elimination and matches were best-of-five. The winner of the summer split automatically qualified for the 2016 World Championship, while the team with the most cumulative championship points from the spring and summer splits also qualified for World Championship. A final team, the winner of the regional finals, also qualified for the World Championship.

== Offseason changes ==
As the team with the worst record in the 2015 NA LCS Summer regular season, Team Dragon Knights was automatically relegated to the NA Challenger Series. As the eighth and ninth team places respectively, Team 8 and Enemy eSports were obligated to play in a promotion tournament against the second and third place Challenger teams, who were Team Coast and Team Imagine respectively. Enemy was relegated after losing to Coast 3–0, but Team 8 beat Imagine 3–1 to remain in the LCS. The two teams that won the Promotion matches both sold their spots to other teams before the start of the spring split. The LA Renegades were automatically promoted by winning the NA Challenger Series.

A total of three teams, Team Coast, Team 8, and Gravity Gaming sold their NA LCS spots, all to new esports organizations that had been created for the sole purpose of being in the LCS. Team Coast sold their spot to NRG eSports, Team 8 sold their spot to Immortals, and Gravity's spot was sold to Echo Fox. Team Impulse had announced their intentions to sell their spot, but failed to do so prior to the original deadline. However, after the Spring Split, Team Impulse managed to sell its spot to Phoenix1 just before the start of the Summer Split.

== Spring ==
=== Regular season ===
Pos	Team	Pld	W	L	PCT	Qualification or relegation
1	Immortals	18	17	1	.944	Advance to semifinals
2	Counter Logic Gaming	18	13	5	.722	Advance to semifinals
3	Cloud9	18	12	6	.667	Advance to quarterfinals
4	Team Liquid	18	10	8	.556	Advance to quarterfinals
5	NRG Esports	18	9	9	.500	Advance to quarterfinals
6	Team SoloMid	18	9	9	.500	Advance to quarterfinals
7	Echo Fox	18	6	12	.333	
8	LA Renegades	18	5	13	.278	Promotion tournament
9	Team Impulse	18	5	13	.278	Promotion tournament
10	Dignitas	18	4	14	.222	Relegated to NA CS

Source: LoL Esports (Archived January 23, 2018, at the Wayback Machine)
Rules for classification: 1) Winning percentage; 2) head-to-head record; 3) tiebreaker match(es)

=== Playoffs ===
The 2016 NA LCS Spring finals saw a rematch of the previous split's finals between Team SoloMid and Counter Logic Gaming. The finals were played in Las Vegas, Nevada at the Mandalay Bay Events Center.

==== Bracket ====
Quarterfinals
3	Cloud 9	1
6	Team SoloMid	3
4	Team Liquid	3
5	NRG eSports	0

Semifinals
1	Immortals	0
6	Team SoloMid	3
Top seed selects opponent
2	Counter Logic Gaming	3
4	Team Liquid	2

Final
6	Team SoloMid	2
2	Counter Logic Gaming	3
Third place
4	Team Liquid	0
3	Immortals	3

Source: LoL Esports (Archived November 27, 2017, at the Wayback Machine)

=== Promotion tournament ===
Quarterfinals
B2	Team Dragon Knights	3
B3	Team Dignitas	0

Semifinals
Winner to 2016 Summer
A1	Renegades	3
B2	Team Dragon Knights	0
Winner to 2016 Summer
A2	Team Impulse	3
B1	Apex Gaming	0

Final
Winner to 2016 Summer
B2	Team Dragon Knights	0
B1	Apex Gaming	3

Source: LoL Esports (Archived November 27, 2017, at the Wayback Machine)

=== Awards ===
- Most Valuable Player: Reignover, Immortals
- Rookie of the Split: Dardoch, Team Liquid
- Coach of the Split: Dylan Falco, Immortals
- 1st Team All-Pro:
  - T Huni, Immortals
  - J Reignover, Immortals
  - M Jensen, Cloud9
  - B WildTurtle, Immortals
  - S Adrian, Immortals
- 2nd Team All-Pro:
  - T Darshan, Counter Logic Gaming
  - J Rush, Immortals
  - M Pobelter, Immortals
  - B Sneaky, Cloud9
  - S Hai, Cloud9
- 3rd Team All-Pro:
  - T Balls, Cloud9
  - J Dardoch, Team Liquid
  - M Bjergsen, Team SoloMid
  - B Piglet, Team Liquid
  - S Aphromoo, Counter Logic Gaming

== Summer ==
=== Regular season ===
Pos	Team	Pld	W	L	PCT	Qualification or relegation
1	Team SoloMid	18	17	1	.944	Advance to semifinals
2	Immortals	18	16	2	.889	Advance to semifinals
3	Cloud9	18	12	6	.667	Advance to quarterfinals
4	Counter Logic Gaming	18	10	8	.556	Advance to quarterfinals
5	Team Liquid	18	9	9	.500	Advance to quarterfinals
6	Team EnVyUs (Note: Team EnVyUs acquired Renegade's LCS seed)	18	8	10	.444	Advance to quarterfinals
7	Apex Gaming	18	8	10	.444	
8	Phoenix1 (Note: Phoenix1 acquired Team Impulse's LCS seed)	18	5	13	.278	Promotion tournament
9	NRG Esports	18	4	14	.222	Promotion tournament
10	Echo Fox	18	1	17	.056	Relegated to NA CS

Source: LoL Esports (Archived January 18, 2018, at the Wayback Machine)
Rules for classification: 1) Winning percentage; 2) head-to-head record; 3) tiebreaker match(es)

=== Playoffs ===
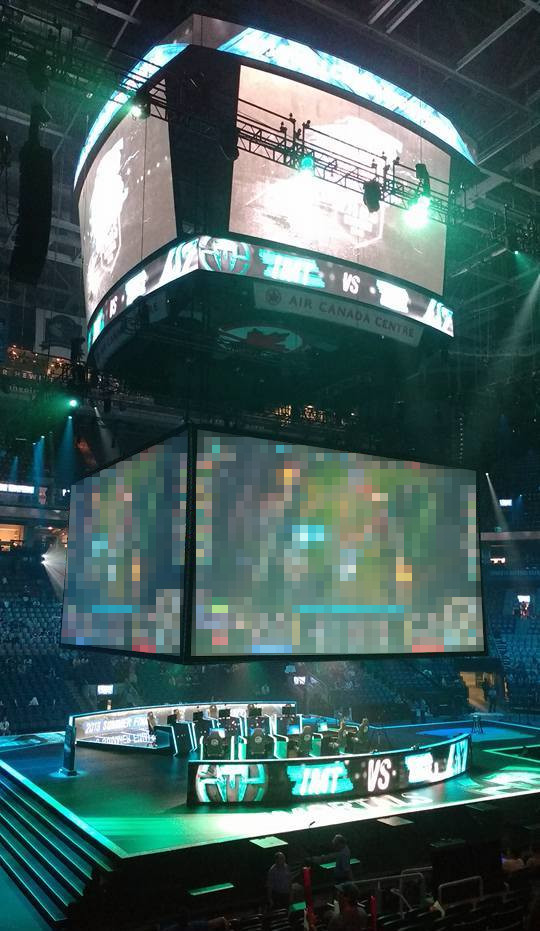
The playoff stage for the third place match between Immortals and Counter Logic Gaming.

The summer finals were held at the Air Canada Centre in Toronto, Canada, the first time an NA LCS match had been played outside of the United States.

==== Bracket ====
Quarterfinals
3	Cloud9	3
6	Team EnVyUs	1
4	Counter Logic Gaming	3
5	Team Liquid	1

Semifinals
1	Team SoloMid	3
4	Counter Logic Gaming	0
Top seed selects opponent
2	Immortals	2
3	Cloud9	3

Final
1	Team SoloMid	3
3	Cloud9	1
Third place
3	Immortals	3
4	Counter Logic Gaming	2

Source: LoL Esports (Archived January 18, 2018, at the Wayback Machine)

=== Promotion tournament ===
Quarterfinals
B2	Echo Fox	3
B3	Team Liquid Academy	2

Semifinals
Winner to 2017 Spring
A1	Phoenix1	3
B2	Echo Fox	0
Winner to 2017 Spring
A2	NRG Esports	0
B1	Cloud9 Challenger	3

Final
Winner to 2017 Spring
B2	Echo Fox	3
A2	NRG Esports	0

Source: LoL Esports (Archived January 23, 2018, at the Wayback Machine)

=== Awards ===
- Most Valuable Player: Bjergsen, Team SoloMid
- Rookie of the Split: Biofrost, Team SoloMid
- Coach of the Split: Parth, Team SoloMid
- 1st Team All-Pro:
  - T Hauntzer, Team SoloMid
  - J Reignover, Immortals
  - M Bjergsen, Team SoloMid
  - B Doublelift, Team SoloMid
  - S Biofrost, Team SoloMid
- 2nd Team All-Pro:
  - T Huni, Immortals
  - J Svenskeren, Team SoloMid
  - M Pobelter, Immortals
  - B Sneaky, Cloud9
  - S Aphromoo, Counter Logic Gaming
- 3rd Team All-Pro:
  - T Impact, Cloud9
  - J Dardoch, Team Liquid
  - M Jensen, Cloud9
  - B WildTurtle, Immortals
  - S Adrian, Immortals

== Worlds qualification ==
=== Championship Points ===
Pos	Team	Spr	Sum	Total	Qualification
1	Team SoloMid	70	AQ	AQ	2016 League of Legends World Championship
2	Counter Logic Gaming	90	40	130	2016 League of Legends World Championship
3	Immortals	50	70	120	Advance to regional qualifier
4	Cloud9	10	90	100	Advance to regional qualifier
5	Team Liquid	30	20	50	Advance to regional qualifier
6	Team EnVyUs	0	20	20	Advance to regional qualifier
7	Apex Gaming	N/A	0	0	
8	Echo Fox	0	0	0	
9	NRG Esports	10 (Note: NRG lost Spring Split points due to placing in a relegation position during the Summer Split)	0	0	
10	Phoenix1	0	0	0	
11	Dignitas	0	N/A	0	

Source: 2016 NA LCS Rulebook
Rules for classification: 1) Championship points; 2) Summer Split points; 3) Summer Split regular season winning percentage; 4) Head-to-head record

=== Regional qualifier ===
Round 1
5	Team Liquid	0
6	Team EnVyUs	3

Round 2
4	Cloud9	3
6	Team EnVyUs	0

Finals
3	Immortals	1
4	Cloud9	3

Source: LoL Esports (Archived January 18, 2018, at the Wayback Machine)
