= Huni (gamer) =

South Korean League of Legends player

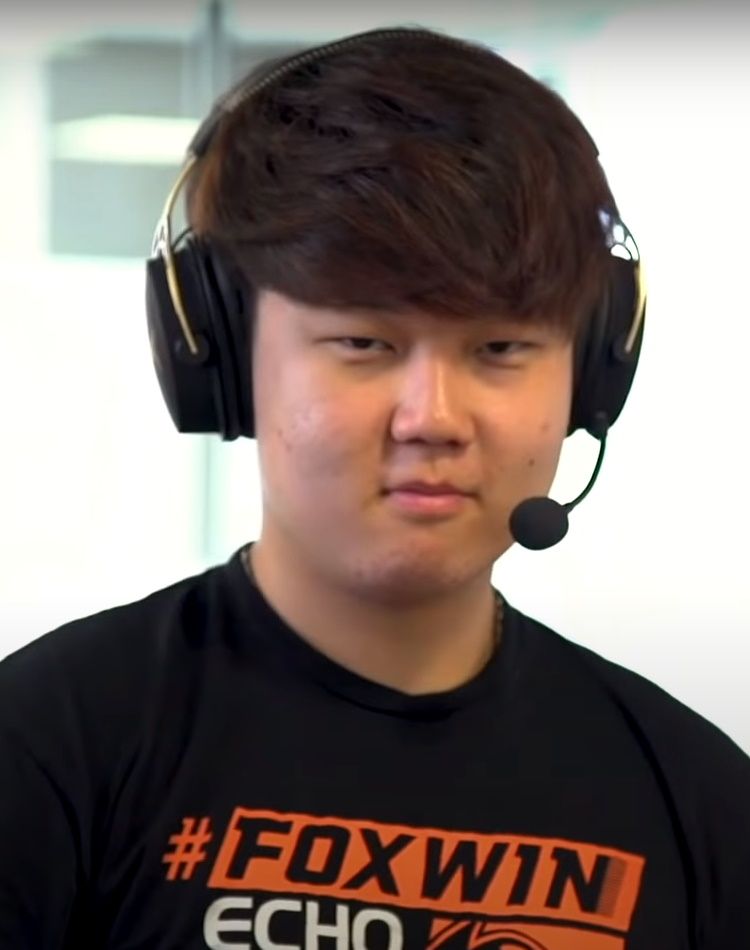
- Huni in 2018

Personal information
- Name: 허승훈 (Heo Seung-hoon)
- Born: 1997 or 1998 (age 28–29)
- Nationality: South Korean

Career information
- Game: League of Legends
- Playing career: 2015–2022
- Role: Top laner

Team history
- 2015: Fnatic
- 2016: Immortals
- 2017: SK Telecom T1
- 2018: Echo Fox
- 2019: Clutch Gaming
- 2020: Dignitas
- 2020: Evil Geniuses
- 2021–2022: Team SoloMid

Career highlights and awards
- MSI champion (2017); LCK champion (2017); 2× LEC champion; 1× LEC All–Pro First Team; 2× LCS All–Pro First Team

Heo Seung-hoon (Korean: 허승훈), also known as his pseudonym Huni (/ˈhuːni/), is a South Korean former professional League of Legends player. He is currently an analyst for Riot Games in LCK.

== Career ==
Huni started his career in League of Legends as a part of the Samsung organization. He was one of the practice partners for the team, though he was never announced as an official substitute for the team. Just before the start of the 2015 EU LCS Spring/Regular Season, Huni joined Fnatic as their starting toplaner, his first official team, as part of the new roster alongside Reignover, Febiven, Steelback, and YellOwStaR — the only player from the previous line-up. In spite of low expectations for the team consisting of relatively unknown players, they placed second in the regular season with a 13–5 game record, and Huni won the Rookie of the Split award for the EU LCS. In the playoffs, Huni and Fnatic took first place for the 2015 Spring EU LCS after edging out Unicorns of Love in a 3–2 series. From there, Huni went to MSI, where he and the rest of Fnatic showed the world that EU wasn't anything to be trifled with. After making it out of the group stages, Huni and Fnatic finally lost in the semi-finals to Korea's SKT T1 in a close 2–3 series.

Returning with Fnatic for the 2015 Summer Split of the EU LCS, Huni and the rest of Fnatic became the first team in LCS history to have an entirely undefeated regular season split, going 18-0. Fnatic proceeded to the finals of the EU LCS where their undefeated streak was finally ended by Origen, although they did still win the finals, ending with a 3–2 series over Origen. Huni then traveled with Fnatic to the 2015 World Championship, where they were drawn into Group B alongside Taiwan's ahq e-Sports Club, North America's Cloud9, and China's Invictus Gaming. Fnatic emerged triumphant and left the group stage in first place. Advancing to the quarter-finals, Huni and Fnatic were against China's Edward Gaming and won a swift 3–0 series. Advancing to the semi-finals, Huni and Fnatic finally were stopped against Korea's KOO Tigers, ending in a 0–3 series and ending their run at worlds.

In the following season, Huni and his teammate Reignover both asked for a raise, which Fnatic declined, and the two of them decided to join the Immortals roster that was being put together in North America, joining veterans WildTurtle, Pobelter, and Adrian. Immortals finished 3rd in both spring and summer, but lost in the regional gauntlet to Cloud9 and Huni missed out on worlds.

On December 1, 2016, defending World champion SK Telecom T1 announced Huni had become a member of the team.

Huni joined Echo Fox in 2018. In the regular season, his team tied for first place and Huni took home All-Pro honors for a dominant spring split. In playoffs however, Echo Fox fell in the semifinals to the eventual champions, Team Liquid, although won the third place match against Clutch Gaming. In summer, the team disappointed, falling in the quarterfinals to Team SoloMid and lost to TSM once again in the regional qualifier, missing Worlds.

Huni signed with Clutch Gaming in 2019. The team missed playoffs entirely in spring, but rallied in summer, reaching the quarterfinals where they beat Team SoloMid before stumbling vs Team Liquid in semis. Huni and CG qualified for the regional gauntlet where they won three back to back games to claim the final spot at the 2019 World Championship. After the end of the season, it was reported that Huni had agreed to a two-year extension of his contract with his team, now rebranded as Dignitas, which guaranteed him $2.3 million in salary over two years. This made Huni one of the highest paid players in LCS history.

Midway through the 2020 season, Huni changed teams and moved to Evil Geniuses.

In 2021, Huni joined TSM. In August 2022, Huni announced his retirement from professional League of Legends, due to recurring wrist problems.

== Tournament results ==
- 1st — 2015 Spring EU LCS (Fnatic)
- 1st — 2015 Summer EU LCS (Fnatic)
- 3rd–4th — 2015 League of Legends World Championship (Fnatic)
- 3rd — 2016 Spring NA LCS (Immortals)
- 2nd — 2016 NA LCS Summer regular season (Immortals)
- 3rd — 2016 NA LCS Summer playoffs (Immortals)
- 1st — 2017 LCK Spring Split (SKT T1)
- 1st — 2017 LCK Spring Playoff (SKT T1)
- 1st — 2017 Mid-Season Invitational (SKT T1)
- 4th — 2017 LCK Summer Split (SKT T1)
- 2nd — 2017 LCK Summer Playoff (SKT T1)
- 2nd — 2017 League of Legends World Championship (SKT T1)
- 3rd — 2018 NA LCS Spring Split (Echo Fox)
- 2nd — 2018 Rift Rivals 2018: NA vs EU (Echo Fox)
- 5th–6th — 2018 NA LCS Summer (Echo Fox)
- 3rd — NA LCS Regional Finals 2018 (Echo Fox)
- 9th — 2019 LCS Spring (Clutch Gaming)
- 4th — 2019 LCS Summer (Clutch Gaming)
- 1st — LCS Regional Finals 2019 (Clutch Gaming)
