= Immortals Gaming Club =

Esports holding company

Immortals, LLC
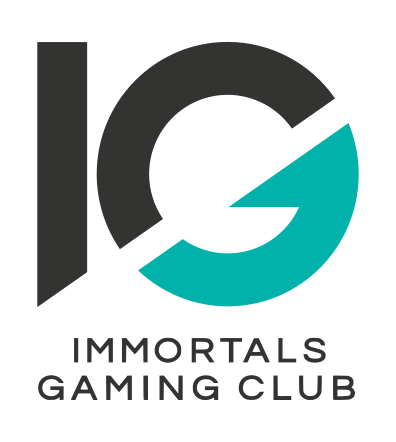
- Trade name: Immortals Gaming Club
- Type: Private
- Industry: Entertainment and sports
- Founder: Noah Whinston
- Headquarters: Los Angeles
- Key people: Peter Levin (Chairman); Jordan Sherman (CEO)
- Subsidiaries: Immortals; Los Angeles Valiant
- Website: www.immortals.gg

Immortals, LLC, doing business as Immortals Gaming Club (IGC), is a collective esports and gaming company. The company rebranded from Immortals to Immortals Gaming Club in 2019 after they acquired Brazil's Gamers Club. IGC owns and operates IGC Esports, which houses the Immortals, and the Los Angeles Valiant, and also has a partnership with the Brazilian sports club Corinthians. It previously owned MiBR.

== Investors ==
Investors for the group include Anschutz Entertainment Group, Peter Levin, the president of Lionsgate Interactive Venture and Games, who co-founded Nerdist; Allen Debevoise, former chairman at Machinima.com; Steve Kaplan, a co-owner of the NBA's Memphis Grizzlies; serial entrepreneur Brian Lee, Meg Whitman, entertainment industry venture capitalists Machine Shop Ventures, and others.

== Subsidiaries ==
- Immortals
- Los Angeles Valiant
- Gamers Club

== Previously Owned ==
- MiBR

== Partnerships ==
- Corinthians
