= Seung-hoon =

- Hangul: 승훈
- RR: Seunghun
- MR: Sŭnghun

Seung-hoon, also spelled Seung-hun, is a Korean given name.

People with this name include:

- Yi Seung-hun (1756–1801), Korean Roman Catholic martyr
- Lee Seung-hoon (boxer) (born 1960), South Korean boxer
- Oh Seung-hoon (footballer) (born 1988), South Korean football player
- Lee Seung-hoon (speed skater) (born 1988), South Korean speed skater
- Shin Seung-hun (born 1966), South Korean ballad singer
- Oh Seung-hoon (actor) (born 1991), South Korean actor and model
- Lee Seung-hoon (musician) (born 1992), South Korean singer, member of boy band Winner
- Huni (video gamer) (born Heo Seung-hoon, 1997), South Korean League of Legends player

Fictional characters with this name include:

- Yoo Seung-hoon, in 2012 South Korean television series Shut Up Flower Boy Band

== See also ==
- List of Korean given names
- You Seung-hun (유승현; born 1983), South Korean swimmer
