= Shymko =

Shymko (Ukrainian: Шимко) is a Ukrainian surname. Notable people with the surname include:

- Aleksandr Shymko (born 1977), Ukrainian composer and pianist
- Kyedae Shymko (born 2001), Canadian video game streamer
- Yuri Shymko (born 1940), Canadian politician
