= Team Impulse =

Former League of Legends team

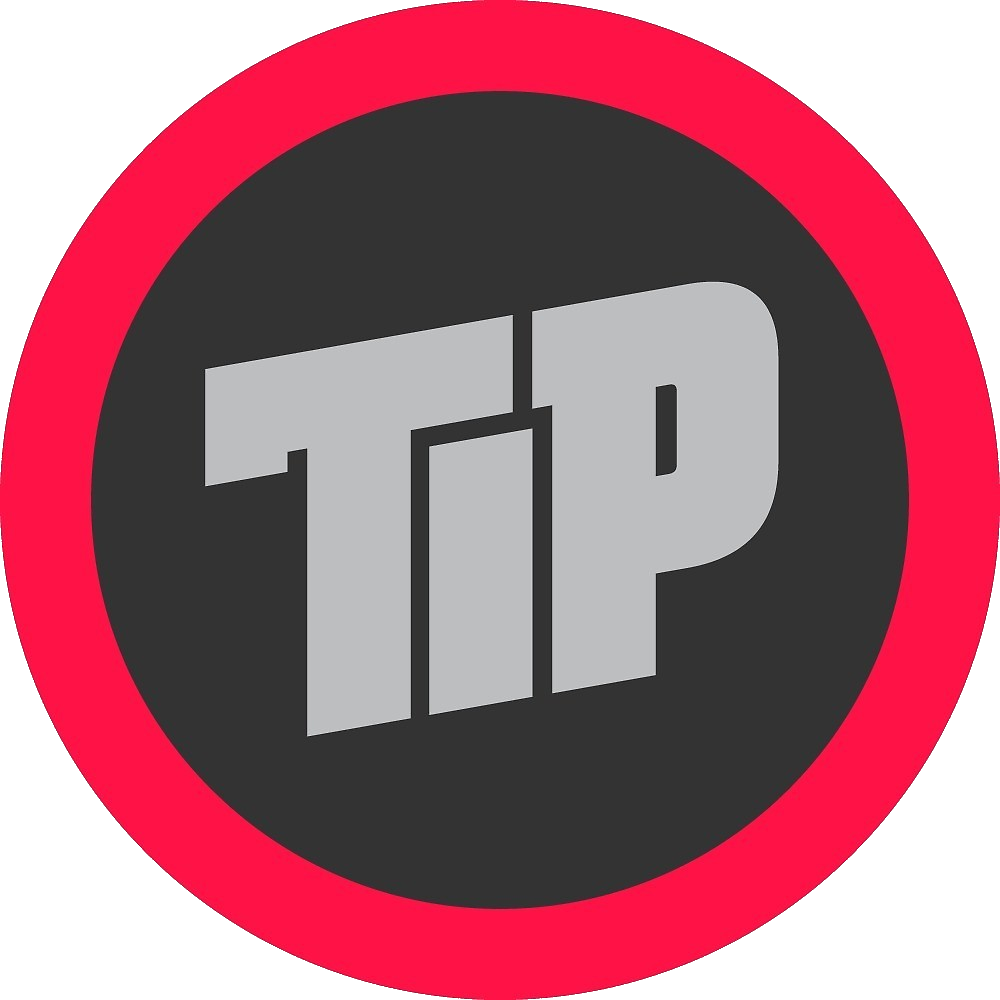
- Short name: TiP
- Game: League of Legends
- Founded: December 26, 2015
- Folded: May 23, 2016
- League: NA LCS
- Team history: LMQ (2013–2014)
- Location: United States
- Head coach: Jason Pan
- Manager: Lucas Wen
- Website: Official website

Team Impulse (TiP) was a professional League of Legends team that competed in the North American League of Legends Championship Series (NA LCS). The team was previously known as LMQ and was founded as a sister team to Royal Club that competed in the League of Legends Pro League in China. The team moved to North America on December 15, 2013, and competed in the North American scene. The team previously competed under the name LMQ iBUYPOWER in representation of their former sponsor iBUYPOWER. On December 26, the team rebranded as Team Impulse.

== History ==
=== 2013 ===
LMQ was formed in July 2013 after merging portions of the rosters of Team Livemore and Royal Club Tian Ci: Dreams, F1sh, andWayoff from the former; Mor, NoName, TS, XiaoWeiXiao, and PandaB from the latter. LMQ competed in the summer split of the 2013 LPL; despite taking a game off the Season 3 runner-up Royal Club, LMQ finished with a disappointing 8–13 record in sixth place.

In November 2013, after the Season 3 World Championship, F1sh and PandaB moved to LMQ's sister team, Royal Club. At that month's National Electronic Sports Tournament, LMQ went 2–1 in the tournament's group stage after downing CC Club and Team WE Academy while falling to the parent Team WE. In the bracket stage, LMQ lost 1–2 to the tournament favorite and eventual winner OMG, but rebounded in a 2–0 victory against Royal Club in the third place match.

On December 15, 2013, LMQ left its parent organization Tian Ci and obtained a new sponsor in iBUYPOWER. With the assistance of its new sponsor, LMQ moved to North America to take advantage of better esports infrastructure. At this point, Dreams and Wayoff left the team, to be replaced by Royal Club top-laner GoDlike, who renamed to ackerman.

=== 2014 ===
In January 2014, LMQ made their way atop the North American 5v5 Challenger tier and earned an invite to the official Riot-sponsored Challenger Series, also known as the Coke League. In their North American debut, LMQ went 8-0 and beat compLexity.Black 2–0 in the finals. By finishing first, LMQ received 9 Challenger Series Points and earned a berth in the second series. There, in March, LMQ went 4–1 on their way to a 2–0 win in the finals against Cloud9 Tempest, thus clinching the top overall seed in the Challenger Series playoffs to be held later in the season.

While competing in the second Challenger Series, LMQ was also offered an invite to the North American Challenger League (NACL) Season 2 Qualifiers, where they went undefeated and secured a spot in the league. During the league's regular season, LMQ went 18-4 without a losing record against any team. During the March playoffs, LMQ defeated Cloud9 Tempest 2–1 in the semifinals and moved on to face Team 8 in the tournament's grand finals. LMQ won the final series 3-1 and became NACL champions.

After having secured a spot in the semi-finals of the Challenger Series playoffs due to their number of points accumulated from both Challenger Series, LMQ went on to defeat Curse Academy in a 2–0 victory sending them to the finals against Cloud9 Tempest. LMQ won the Challenger Series playoffs with a 5–2 record and the grand prize of $16,000.

In April 2014, LMQ secured a spot for the 2014 NA LCS Summer Split after beating XDG Gaming 3–0 in the 2014 Season Summer Promotion Tournament.

LMQ placed 3rd in the Summer playoffs and qualified for the 2014 League of Legends World Championship. The team placed 9 - 12th after failing to make it to the bracket stage.

LMQ became embroiled in an ownership scandal which saw a dispute between the team's original owner, Guanzhou-based Tian Ci Performing Planning and A&K Esports.

On November 24, Alex Gu announced that LMQ's 2015 would include XiaoWeiXiao once again and that Popstar Adrian had signed with the team as their new support player.

On December 26, LMQ announced that they were rebranding as Team Impulse. The initial roster included Rush, XiaoWeiXiao, and Adrian, with Fly as their head coach. On January 1 WizFujiiN (now Apollo) and then on January 8 Impact joined the team.

=== 2015 ===
After using Rhux as a substitute for Impact in the first week, Team Impulse finished the round robin with an 11–7 record, in fourth place. In the playoffs, they defeated Gravity before losing to Team SoloMid and then Team Liquid, placing fourth overall. In the summer season, Team Impulse started shakily, placing no higher than sixth through the end of the fifth week. Starting in the sixth week, the team went on a massive winning streak, which was almost able to continue through two roster changes. They were in second place in the standings a while. Adrian sat out one game and was replaced by Gate. Later XiaoWeiXiao was suspended pending an investigation into Elo boosting prior to the ninth week. This prompted Adrian to return and Gate to move back to his primary role of mid lane to replace XiaoWeiXiao. This temporary suspension was eventually lengthened to a competitive ban until February 2016. Regardless, Team Impulse finished the last week tied for third place with Gravity and then won their tiebreaker game.

In the summer playoffs, the team beat Team Dignitas 3-0 before losing to both Counter Logic Gaming and Team Liquid to finish fourth, leaving them with the second-place spot in the Regional Final due to Championship Points. There, they became the second team in a row to fall to underdogs Cloud9 in a reverse sweep and so fell short of the World Championship.

On October 22, it was announced that Team Impulse was for sale. The team failed to sell their spot by the deadline.

=== 2016 ===
The team competed in the 2016 NA LCS Spring Split where they finished 9th with a record of 5-13.

On May 8, Riot Games issued a ruling banning Team Impulse from LCS and forcing the team to sell its spot within ten days. The punishment was issued due to Impulse failing to pay its players as well as not providing valid contracts. Despite the ten day deadline, the team did not sell their spot until May 23, when it was purchased by Phoenix1.

=== Final roster ===
Nat.	ID	Name	Role
(China)	Feng	Wang Xiao-Feng	Top Laner
(South Korea)	Procxin	Kim Se-young	Jungler
(South Korea)	Pirean	Choi Jun-sik	Mid Laner
(Canada)	Mash	Brandon Phan	Bot Laner
(United States)	Gate	Austin Yu	Support

== Tournament results ==
- 9th — 2016 NA LCS Spring Round Robin
- 3rd — 2015 Season North America Regional Finals
- 4th – 2015 NA LCS Summer Playoffs
- 3rd — 2015 NA LCS Summer Round Robin
- 4th — 2015 NA LCS Spring Playoffs
- 4th — 2015 NA LCS Spring Season
