= Pobelter =

American professional esports player

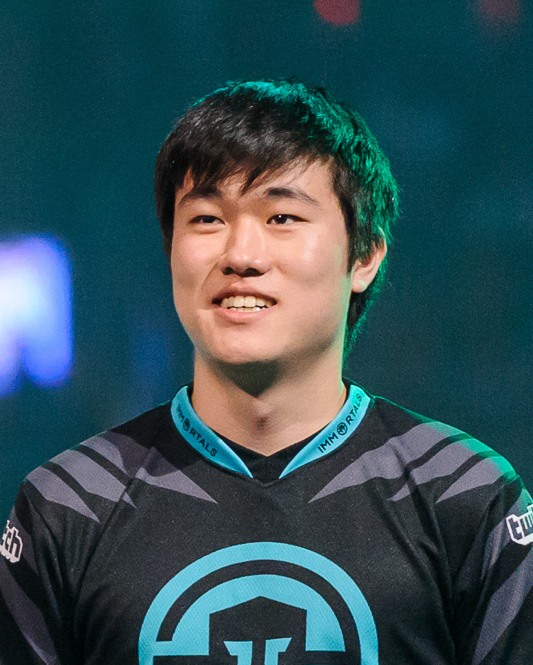
- Park in 2016

Personal information
- Name: Eugene Park
- Nickname: The Notorious P.O.B.
- Nationality: American

Career information
- Games: League of Legends
- Role: Mid Laner

Team history
- 2011–2012: Team Curse
- 2013: Curse Academy
- 2013: Team Curse
- 2014: Evil Geniuses
- 2015: Winterfox
- 2015: Counter Logic Gaming
- 2016–2017: Immortals
- 2018: Team Liquid
- 2019: FlyQuest
- 2020–2021: Counter Logic Gaming

Career highlights and awards
- 3× LCS champion

Eugene Park, better known as Pobelter, is an American retired League of Legends player who was formerly the mid laner for Counter Logic Gaming. He is a three-time champion of the LCS and has made four major international appearances.

== Early life ==
Pobelter has an older sister. He attended Troy High School in Fullerton, California. He tested into the school as he was an out-of-district student, and studied computer science in the Troy Tech magnet program. Pobelter initially played League of Legends as a hobby during high school.

== Career ==
Pobelter played on Team Curse, and eventually moved to Winterfox, a team largely perceived as being built around him. After Winterfox's loss in the relegation tournament after the Spring 2015 season, Pobelter abandoned the team and moved to Counter Logic Gaming, which proceeded to win the Summer 2015 Split. CLG then elected to play Huhi as their mid laner, prompting Pobelter to move to Immortals, which had highly successful regular seasons in 2016 but strangely failed in playoffs, losing 0–3 to TSM in the semifinals of the NA LCS Spring Split playoffs in April, and losing 2–3 to Cloud9 in the summer semifinals. They finished third in the 2016 Spring NA LCS, beating Team Liquid 3–0 in the third-place decider match. After Immortals were removed from the LCS in the 2018 season, Pobelter joined the successful Team Liquid. In 2019, Team Liquid replaced Pobelter with Jensen, and Pobelter went to Flyquest. Flyquest was reasonably successful in 2019 Spring, finishing fourth, but placed ninth in the Summer split. Flyquest announced that they had hired Tristan "PowerOfEvil" Schrage as their midlaner for 2020; Pobelter wrote in November 2019 that he had not been picked up by any team for a starting position in 2020. Unable to find a position, Pobelter coached for Team Liquid during the first half of the 2020 Spring Split, but eventually returned to Counter Logic Gaming's as their midlaner. On August 5, 2020, he was optioned to CLG's academy team.

== Tournament results ==
Career Tournament Results
Date	Event	Placing	Team	Record	Opponent
August 3–5, 2012	2012 MLG Summer Championship	(bronze) 3rd	Team Curse	1-2	Azubu Blaze, Team SoloMid, and Team BLACK
March 15–17, 2013	2013 MLG Winter Championship	3rd-4th	Curse Academy	0-2	Velocity eSports
June 29, 2013	2013 MLG Spring Championship	3rd-4th	Curse Academy	1-2	FXOpen e-Sports
January 24–March 29, 2015	2015 NA LCS Spring Regular Season	8th	Winterfox	7-11	N/A
May 30–July 26, 2015	2015 NA LCS Summer Regular Season	(silver) 2nd	Counter Logic Gaming	13-5	N/A
August 23, 2015	2015 NA LCS Summer Playoffs	(gold) 1st	Counter Logic Gaming	3-0	Team SoloMid
January 16–March 20, 2016	2016 NA LCS Spring Regular Season	(gold) 1st	Immortals	17-1	N/A
April 10, 2016	2016 NA LCS Spring Playoffs	(bronze) 3rd	Immortals	3-0	Team Liquid
June 3–July 31, 2016	2016 NA LCS Summer Regular Season	(silver) 2nd	Immortals	16-2	N/A
August 27, 2016	2016 NA LCS Summer Playoffs	(bronze) 3rd	Immortals	3-2	Counter Logic Gaming
January 20–March 26, 2017	2017 NA LCS Spring Regular Season	7th	Immortals	8-10	N/A
June 2–August 6, 2017	2017 NA LCS Summer Regular Season	(silver) 2nd	Immortals	14-4	N/A
September 3, 2017	2017 NA LCS Summer Playoffs	(silver) 2nd	Immortals	1-3	Team SoloMid
October 5–15, 2017	2017 League of Legends World Championship Group Stage	9th-12th	Immortals	2-5	Longzhu Gaming, Fnatic, and GIGABYTE Marines
January 20–March 18, 2018	2018 NA LCS Spring Regular Season	4th	Team Liquid	12-8	N/A
April 8, 2018	2018 NA LCS Spring Playoffs	(gold) 1st	Team Liquid	3-0	100 Thieves
