= TenZ =

Canadian online streamer (born 2001)

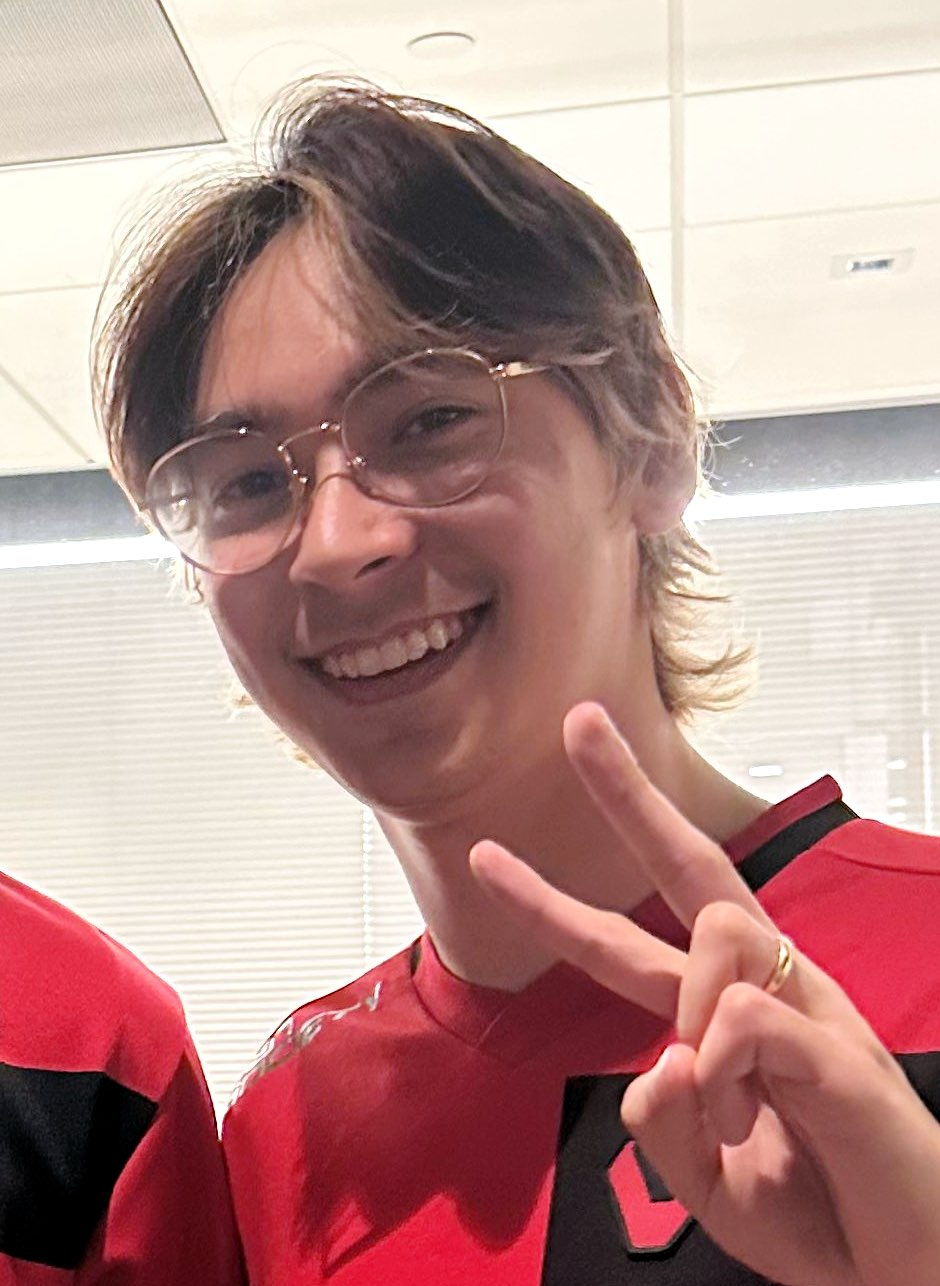
- TenZ in November 2023

Personal information
- Born: Tyson Van Ngo; May 5, 2001 (age 25); Nanaimo, British Columbia, Canada

Current team
- Team: T1

Career information
- Games: CS:GO; Valorant
- Playing career: 2019–present
- Role: Duelist; Initiator; Controller

Team history
- Counter-Strike
- 2019–2020: Cloud9
- Valorant
- 2020–2021: Cloud9
- 2021–2024: Sentinels
- 2024–2025: Sentinels (Content Creator)
- 2026–: T1

Career highlights and awards
- 2x VCT Masters Champion (Reykjavík 2021, Madrid 2024); VCT Masters Grand Finals MVP (Reykjavík 2021); VCT Americas Kickoff Champion (2024)

Twitch information
- Channel: TenZ
- Followers: 4.60 million

YouTube information
- Channel: TenZ
- Subscribers: 2.83 million
- Last updated: September 29, 2026

Tyson Van Ngo (born May 5, 2001), professionally known as TenZ, is a Canadian professional Valorant player currently competing with T1. He was formerly a professional Counter-Strike: Global Offensive player.

He began his esports career in October 2019 as a Counter-Strike: Global Offensive player for Cloud9. In April 2020, he transitioned to Valorant, playing for Cloud9. He took a break from professional Valorant in January 2021 to focus on full-time streaming career on Twitch. Later in April, he was loaned to Sentinels. He went on to win the VCT Stage Two Masters in Reykjavík later that year. In June 2021, his Cloud9 contract was bought out by Sentinels, where he would remain until the end of his professional career in September 2024. On November 2026, he announced his return to professional gaming after signing with T1

== Early life ==
Tyson Van Ngo was born on May 5, 2001, is from Nanaimo, on Vancouver Island, British Columbia, and is of Vietnamese and French descent.

== Career ==
=== Counter-Strike: Global Offensive ===
TenZ's professional career began in July 2019 when, at the age of 18, he joined the Cloud9 team in the first-person shooter title Counter-Strike: Global Offensive (CS:GO). He was seen as a rising North American prodigy. He had previously stood in for some organizations. However, after the team failed to perform at a high level, TenZ was benched in October of that year. TenZ began full-time content creation in January 2020.

=== Valorant ===
==== Cloud9 ====
However, in April 2020, following the public beta release of Riot Games' first-person shooter Valorant, TenZ announced his decision to retire from CS:GO and opted to transition into Valorant, thereby becoming Cloud9's first professional player in the title.

==== Sentinels ====
In January 2021, TenZ announced his departure from professional Valorant to focus on a career in content creation. However, his hiatus was short-lived, as Cloud9 agreed to loan TenZ to Sentinels in April 2021, following the suspension of Sentinels player Sinatraa. During the first two stages of the 2021 Valorant Champions Tour (VCT), TenZ competed remotely from Canada. Sentinels went on to win the first international Valorant tournament, the VCT Stage 2 Masters Reykjavík after sweeping Fnatic in the grand finals by a score of 3–0; TenZ was named the grand finals MVP. On June 2, 2021, Sentinels bought out TenZ's contract, reported to be valued between US$1.25 to $1.5 million.

After their first international trophy on May 30, 2021, TenZ and Sentinels would not win another trophy for almost 3 years.

On April 18, 2023, Sentinels head coach Adam Kaplan announced that TenZ would be temporarily benched due to illness and a hand injury.

On March 24, 2024, TenZ achieved his second international trophy, winning VCT Masters Madrid alongside Sentinels by defeating Gen.G 3-2. With this win, he is the second Valorant player to win two Masters trophies, and the only player to do so under the same organization. (Timofey "Chronicle" Khromov was the first to do so with Gambit and Fnatic.)

On September 14, 2024, TenZ announced his retirement from professional Valorant after four years of competing.

==== T1 ====
On May 9, 2026, T1 signed TenZ as a content creator and influencer. TenZ openly stated that he is listed as an available emergency substitute for T1’s roster. He then announced his return to competitive Valorant on November 12, 2026 after signing with the team's main roster

== Personal life ==
He moved to Los Angeles in January 2022. He was engaged to Kyedae Shymko, a content creator. The couple announced their engagement in August 2022. They jointly announced an amicable end to their relationship in February 2026.

He stated in an interview that he had ADHD, but he did not fully address the disorder until he took a break from competitive Valorant. He also revealed in a video published on the official Sentinels YouTube channel that he is protanomaly colorblind, and as a result uses yellow instead of red as his enemy highlight color in Valorant.

In April 2025, TenZ was unveiled as a global brand ambassador for Dutch peripheral manufacturer Wooting. The agreement formalised several years of on‑stream use of Wooting’s keyboards models and will feature collaborative content and limited‑edition products.

== Awards and nominations ==
Ceremony	Year	Category	Result	Ref.
Esports Awards	2021	Esports PC Player of the Year	Nominated	
Esports Awards	2021	Esports PC Rookie of the Year	Nominated	
The Game Awards	2021	Best Esports Athlete	Nominated	
The Streamer Awards	2021	Best FPS Streamer	Nominated	
The Streamer Awards	2022	Gamer of the Year	Won	
The Streamer Awards	2023	Best FPS Streamer	Nominated	
The Streamer Awards	2024	Best FPS Streamer	Nominated	
The Streamer Awards	2024	Gamer of the Year	Nominated	
Streamy Awards	2023	Competitive Gamer	Won	

== Ranked Performance ==
Over the course of Valorant ranked (2020-2026), TenZ has peaked Radiant (the highest rank in Valorant) 30 out of 39 times out of all 39 Acts. Additionally, the other 9 times he did not peak Radiant, he peaked Immortal (the second-highest rank). People who are ranked "Radiant" make up ~0.03-0.05% of the total ranked player base, while people who are ranked "Immortal" make up ~1-1.5% of the total ranked player base. TenZ was the first person to hit the highest rank named "Valorant" (name of the highest rank during the public beta phase of Valorant) in North America. (Victor "food" Wong was the first person to hit the renamed rank of "Radiant" when competitive mode officially launched in June 2020) TenZ has only peaked Radiant #1 once in his entire ranked career since the release of the "Radiant Cap," (the rank "Radiant" became restricted to the top 500 players per region) which was launched in Episode 2, Act 1.

=== Ranked Performance Statistics ===
Lifetime					2000 hrs	2132	58.0%	1.33	27.1%	Jett
Episode	Year	Month Span	Act	Peak Rating	Play Time	Wins	Win %	K/D	HS%	Top Agent
Season 2026	2026	October 14 - January 6, 2027	V26:A6	Immortal 1 52 RR, #3,369	2.8 hrs	2	33.3%	1.21	45.0%	N/A
Season 2026	2026	August 18 - October 14	V26:A5	Immortal 3 233 RR, #567	61 hrs	60	50.8%	1.15	32.8%	Jett
Season 2026	2026	June 22 - August 18	V26:A4	Radiant 339 RR, #469	38 hrs	34	45.3%	1.25	33.7%	Jett
Season 2026	2026	April 29 - June 24	V26:A3	Immortal 3 270 RR, #184	44 hrs	39	46.4%	1.18	30.2%	Jett
Season 2026	2026	March 18 - April 29	V26:A2	Immortal 2 195 RR, #817	24 hrs	20	42.6%	1.10	31.8%	Jett
Season 2026	2026	January 7 - March 18	V26:A1	Immortal 3 397 RR, #283	33 hrs	32	50.8%	1.13	32.0%	Jett
Season 2025	2025	October 15 - January 7, 2026	V25:A6	Radiant 459 RR, #454	64 hrs	56	45.5%	1.09	30.1%	Jett
Season 2025	2025	August 20 - October 15	V25:A5	Immortal 3 338 RR, #525	30 hrs	29	47.5%	1.15	30.5%	Veto
Season 2025	2025	June 25 - August 20	V25:A4	Radiant 518 RR, #108	54 hrs	53	50.5%	1.20	31.1%	Jett
Season 2025	2025	April 30 - June 25	V25:A3	Radiant 670 RR, #59	64 hrs	62	52.1%	1.19	30.9%	Jett
Season 2025	2025	March 5 - April 30	V25:A2	Radiant 614 RR, #89	55 hrs	55	53.4%	1.12	28.2%	Jett
Season 2025	2025	January 7 - March 5	V25:A1	Immortal 3 335 RR, #564	37 hrs	33	47.8%	1.22	30.5%	Jett
Episode 9	2024	October 23 - January 7, 2025	E9:A3	Radiant 575 RR, #79	63 hrs	56	48.7%	1.16	30.5%	Neon
Episode 9	2024	August 28 - October 23	E9:A2	Radiant 701 RR, #45	60 hrs	60	52.6%	1.21	28.8%	Jett
Episode 9	2024	June 25 - August 28	E9:A1	Immortal 3 284 RR, #550	19 hrs	22	61.1%	1.44	32.3%	Jett
Episode 8	2024	April 30 - June 25	E8:A3	Radiant 929 RR, #14	54 hrs	67	67.0%	1.31	29.9%	Jett
Episode 8	2024	March 5 - April 30	E8:A2	Radiant 958 RR, #7	50 hrs	69	73.4%	1.38	30.9%	Clove
Episode 8	2024	January 9 - March 5	E8:A1	Radiant 617 RR, #167	45 hrs	52	62.7%	1.49	31.4%	Reyna
Episode 7	2023	October 31 - January 9, 2024	E7:A3	Radiant 881 RR, #28	43 hrs	47	58.8%	1.50	33.6%	Omen
Episode 7	2023	August 29 - October 31	E7:A2	Radiant 1046 RR, #23	48 hrs	67	72.0%	1.49	31.9%	Jett
Episode 7	2023	June 27 - August 29	E7:A1	Radiant 1104 RR, #9	55 hrs	75	71.4%	1.57	27.5%	Jett
Episode 6	2023	April 25 - June 27	E6:A3	Radiant 1120 RR, #2	115 hrs	135	65.2%	1.35	22.6%	Jett
Episode 6	2023	March 6 - April 25	E6:A2	Immortal 3 501 RR, #858	29 hrs	26	50.0%	1.60	29.4%	Jett
Episode 6	2023	January 10 -March 6	E6:A1	Radiant 613 RR, #366	27 hrs	34	68.0%	1.57	24.1%	Jett
Episode 5	2022	October 18 - January 10, 2023	E5:A3	Radiant 930 RR, #22	87 hrs	98	62.0%	1.32	26.7%	Jett
Episode 5	2022	August 23 - October 18	E5:A2	Radiant 846 RR, #52	53 hrs	55	56.7%	1.35	27.0%	Jett
Episode 5	2022	June 22 - August 23	E5:A1	Radiant 944 RR, #7	67 hrs	76	62.3%	1.36	25.6%	Chamber
Episode 4	2022	April 27 - June 22	E4:A3	Radiant 881 RR, #39	59 hrs	59	54.1%	1.29	25.4%	Jett
Episode 4	2022	March 1 - April 27	E4:A2	Radiant 1176 RR, #2	123 hrs	141	63.5%	1.41	24.5%	Jett
Episode 4	2022	January 11 -March 1	E4:A1	Radiant 633 RR, #213	62 hrs	64	58.7%	1.31	23.8%	Jett
Episode 3	2021	November 2 - January 11, 2022	E3:A3	Radiant 781 RR, #132	47 hrs	46	55.4%	1.31	24.2%	Jett
Episode 3	2021	September 8 - November 2	E3:A2	Radiant 892 RR, #31	50 hrs	55	59.1%	1.43	27.0%	Jett
Episode 3	2021	June 22 - September 8	E3:A1	Radiant 703 RR, #87	57 hrs	64	61.0%	1.35	24.0%	Jett
Episode 2	2021	April 27 - June 22	E2:A3	Radiant 806 RR, #39	40 hrs	44	61.1%	1.36	23.1%	Jett
Episode 2	2021	March 2 - April 27	E2:A2	Radiant 463 RR, #5	62 hrs	66	57.9%	1.37	22.6%	Jett
Episode 2	2021	January 12 - March 2	E2:A1	Radiant 899 RR, #1	117 hrs	129	60.6%	1.56	21.9%	Jett
Episode 1	2020	October 13 - January 12, 2021	E1:A3	Radiant	20 hrs	25	67.6%	1.61	19.8%	Jett
Episode 1	2020	August 4 - October 13	E1:A2	Radiant	14 hrs	17	68.0%	1.51	19.2%	Jett
Episode 1	2020	June 2 - August 4	E1:A1	Radiant	10 hrs	8	44.4%	1.31	18.4%	Jett
