= Disguised (esports) =

Canadian esports organization

- Short name: DSG
- Divisions: Valorant; League of Legends; Apex Legends; Teamfight Tactics; Overwatch
- Founded: January 8, 2023; 3 years ago
- Owners: Jeremy Wang
- Website: www.disguised.gg

Disguised (abbreviated DSG) is an esports organization founded in 2023 by Canadian streamer Jeremy "Disguised Toast" Wang. The organization currently fields active teams in League Of Legends, Apex Legends, Tekken 8 and Overwatch with plans to compete in Teamfight Tactics in 2024.

The organization's games are generally streamed on Disguised Toast's Twitch channel, and are marked by Disguised Toast's extreme passion and anxiety for his team to perform well.

== History ==
On January 8, 2023, Internet personality Jeremy "Disguised Toast" Wang, announced a Valorant team under the name "Disguised". The team included members of the former Knights team, with the addition of two players: Steel, formerly a player for 100 Thieves and T1, and Clear, a rookie player. Disguised entered the Valorant Game Changers scene in March 2023.

Disguised branched into League of Legends in June 2023, competing in the North American Challengers League (NACL), and expanded to Apex Legends in August 2023. Disguised's League of Legends team won the organization its first trophy, securing first place in the summer split of the NACL. Disguised also entered Teamfight Tactics in October 2023 in advance of the TFT Vegas Open.

Wang won the Esports Personality of the Year in 2023 primarily for his work with Disguised.

Disguised exited the Valorant Game Changers scene on December 20, 2023, in a tweet.

In May 2024, Disguised entered into the fighting game scene by signing PhiDX to compete in Tekken 8 and announced a partnership with Chipotle Mexican Grill.

In January 2026, Disguised announced in a tweet that an Overwatch team was formed and was set to play their first game in Korea, as part of a bootcamp.

== Divisions ==
=== Valorant ===
Initially having expressed interest in signing a Valorant team in a tweet on October 30, 2022, Wang officially announced his roster and the DSG branding on January 8, 2023. He signed three players from the former Knights core (XXiF, Exalt, and Genghsta) and their coach OCEAN. They were joined by Steel, former T1 and 100 Thieves in-game leader, and rookie player Clear. On January 13, 2023, Disguised qualified for the Valorant Challengers League: North America (VCL: NA) through the Open Qualifier event. However, after four matches of the first split of VCL: NA, Disguised released Exalt and chose to play with their substitute Riku for the remainder of the split.

On March 8, 2023, it was reported that the organization would be forming another Valorant team for the Game Changers Open Qualifier, Valorant's league for women and marginalized genders. Disguised's Game Changers roster was officially announced on March 27, consisting of content creators Jodi "QuarterJade" Lee, Kyedae Shymko, Sydney "Sydeon" Parker, and Tenzin "tenzin" Dolkar, along with former Immortals player Lydia "tupperware" Wilson as in-game leader and Corey "Ruin" Hartog as coach. After failing to qualify for the main event, Wang jokingly "dropped" the team—in reality, the members never had a monetary contract with Disguised and the announcement was a parody of other esports teams' unceremonious firing of their players after failure to qualify.

After having failed to win a match in the Mid-Season Face-Off, Disguised signed Jaccob "yay" Whiteaker to their main roster for split two of VCL: NA. With multiple top international finishes and winner of The Game Awards Best Esports Athlete in 2022, yay's addition was seen as a promising sign for Disguised. Regardless, Disguised's performance failed to improve, going on an 11-game losing streak and ultimately being relegated from VCL: North America. The roster was released shortly after.

On July 10, 2023, Disguised signed a new Game Changers roster consisting of Katarina, Hannah "hannah" Reyes, Nathan "lazylion" Hoang, misu, and unstable. They ultimately placed 6th/7th in the North American Game Changers playoffs, with Disguised later announcing their departure from the Game Changers space citing their loss to a team later disqualified for cheating as an example of the need for Riot Games to improve the Game Changers system.

Disguised rejoined the Valorant scene in 2024 in collaboration with Bleed Esports, as Bleed's affiliate team. In doing so, the organization changed regions from North America to Pacific for Valorant only. The roster consisted of Azrie "Riza" Adly, Tyler "Juicy" Aeria, Wong "JayH" Jia Heng, Bryce "bryce" Lee, and Wayne "wayne" Chang and competed in VCL Malaysia/Singapore Split 1.

After placing third in split 1 of VCL Malaysia/Singapore 2024, the challengers league announced that they launched an investigation into JayH for potential match-fixing, and promptly placed him under suspension. Over a week later, Disguised released a tweet announcing the departure of JayH, bryce, and Riza. JayH was later found innocent and his suspension was lifted.

On May 17, 2024, Disguised announced in a tweet that they had signed Rodman "Vera" Yap, Tidus "STYRON" Goh, and grumble to compete on the roster for the second split. The team finished third in the group stage of split 2 of VCL Malaysia/Singapore 2024. In playoffs, the team finished first and secured a place in the VCT 2024: Ascension Pacific tournament that was held in Indonesia in September. This gave them a chance to compete for a promotion into the tier 1 VCT Pacific League. The team did not win Ascension, losing to Boom Esports in the lower bracket and finishing tied for 5th place.

The team moved to the new VCL Southeast Asia league, as VCL Malaysia/Singapore ceased to exist on July 18, 2024. They finished split 3 as the winners, defeating Made in Thailand in the grand final. However, on January 14, 2025, Disguised announced their withdrawal from VCL Southeast Asia, citing South Korean streaming platform SOOP (formerly AfreecaTV)'s exclusive rights to the league forbidding them from doing costreams on Twitch or other platforms.

==== Final roster ====
DSG Valorant roster
Players
Coaches

Handle	Name	Nationality
JA	John Timothy Arone	Philippines
crazyguy	Ngô Công Anh	Vietnam
Vera	Yap, Rodman	Singapore
STYRON	Goh, Tidus	Singapore
wayne	Chang, Wayne	Singapore

Head coach

Alexander "alexRr" Frisch

Legend:
- (I) Inactive
- (S) Suspended
- Substitute
- (injured) Injury / Illness

Latest roster transaction: January 6, 2025.

=== League Of Legends ===
On June 1, 2023, Disguised announced the creation of a League of Legends team to compete in the North America Challengers League (NACL), the second tier of competition in North America. The roster consisted of three players from reigning NACL champions, Cloud9 Challengers: FakeGod, Tomio, and Zeyzal, along with Young from Golden Guardians Challengers, Meech from CLG Challengers, and coach Goldenglue. The team won the summer 2023 season of the North American Challenger League, but were released after securing the organization's first trophy to provide players with an opportunity to play in the first tier LCS league. Tomio, FakeGod, and Zeyzal were signed by the newly formed Shopify Rebellion, while Meech and Goldenglue left for 100 Thieves. Young was verbally signed by Golden Guardians to their LCS team, however the organization was disbanded in the 2023 offseason and ceased to exist in December 2023.

Disguised chose to remain in the NACL for 2024, signing a roster of Milan "Tenacity" Oleksij, Perry "Perry" Norman, Daniel "Minui" Mingshui, and Philippe "Poome" Lavoie-Giguere, along with the return of Youngho "Young" Choi from the previous year's roster. The team had a disappointing split by finishing 7th in the regular season split and 4th in playoffs to end the spring season. For summer 2024, the team dropped Minui and picked up Frank "Tomo" Lam to replace him in the bot lane. Perry retired from professional play to pursue higher education. He was replaced by Johnny "Yukino" Dang in the Jungle role. Additionally, Head Coach Brandon "Inero" Smith left the team to take up the role of head coach of Immortals in the LCS. He was replaced by Dennis "Svenskeren" Johnsen. However, Tomo was signed mid-split by 100 Thieves as an emergency callup to their LCS team. This forced Tenacity to temporarily move to the Bot lane role and positional coach Brandon "Brandini" Chen to temporarily sub into the top lane role.

DSG League of Legends roster
Players
Coaches

Role	Handle	Name	Nationality
Top	Srtty	Michael Joye, Jett	Australia
Jungle	KryRa	Rahaian, Christian	Canada
Mid	Callme	Ji-hoon, Oh	South Korea
Bot	sajed	Ziade, Sajed	United States
Support	Lyonz	Luis Peralta, Pedro	Argentina

Head coach

Ian "ido" McCormick

Assistant coach(es)

Brandon "Brandini" Chen

Legend:
- (I) Inactive
- (S) Suspended
- Substitute
- (injured) Injury / Illness

Latest roster transaction: May 6, 2026.

=== Apex Legends ===
On August 22, 2023, Disguised announced the signing of an Apex Legends team consisting of Ira "dooplex" Shepherd, Trenton "lou" Clements, and Adam "senoxe" Lau. They had formerly played together as an unsigned roster by the name "Dudes Night Out" and qualified for the Apex Legends Global Series (ALGS) Championship in Birmingham. After competing in the ALGS Championship and placing 33rd, the roster was released.

For 2024, ALGS announced the expansion of their partnership program, with Disguised being one of the twelve teams added. On January 17, 2024, Disguised announced the signing of "The Dojo", fourth place finishers at the ALGS Championship. The roster consisted of Timothy "iiTzTimmy" An who remained signed to 100 Thieves as a content creator, Tyler "Dezignful" Gardner, and Alexander "Enemy" Rodriguez, along with head coach Deston "Bronzey" Nguyen. The team placed 8th in the Split 1 Playoffs and qualified for the ALGS Championship 2024.

On June 11, 2024, iiTzTimmy announced his departure from Disguised to join Moist Esports. The team eventually decided on Arturo "qzier" Hurtado to fill the empty slot and placed 26th at the 2024 Esports World Cup.

DSG Apex Legends roster
Players
Coaches

Handle	Name	Nationality
qzier	Hurtado, Arturo	United States
Dezignful	Gardner, Tyler	United States
Enemy	Rodriguez, Alexander	United States

Head coach

Deston "Bronzey" Nguyen

Legend:
- (I) Inactive
- (S) Suspended
- Substitute
- (injured) Injury / Illness

Latest roster transaction: July 2, 2024.

=== Teamfight Tactics ===
Prior to the Teamfight Tactics Vegas Open, Disguised signed ten players, including Wang himself. During the event, Disguised added two players: Kevin "Prestivent" Zou and Joven "Broccóli" Thandi, with Broccóli placing third overall.

=== Tekken 8 ===
On May 9, 2024, Disguised announced the signing of Tekken 8 player, PhiDX.

DSG Tekken 8 roster
Players
Coaches

Handle	Name	Nationality
PhiDX	Lam, Phi	United States

Head coach

- Vacant

Legend:
- (I) Inactive
- (S) Suspended
- Substitute
- (injured) Injury / Illness

=== Overwatch ===
On January 30, 2026, Disguised announced the creation of a North American Overwatch team, featuring Evan "PGE" Ngo, Joseph "Lep" Cambriani, Julian "Rokit" Pizana, Simon "Scyle" Broström and Alexander "Tred" Madgwick-Smith. Alongside Julian "Raikker" Bevien-Guevarra and Jack "Reyzr" Francis as substitute players for the team.

On September 30th, After a disappointing first two stages, DSG announced the signings of Yoon "smurf" Myeong-hwan, a formerly retired player, and DPS player Ryan "Ryan" Michael Lawless for Stage 3 of OWCS. They also added Canadian DPS player Alex "alex" George as a substitute.

DSG Overwatch roster
Players
Coaches

Role	Handle	Name	Nationality
Tank	smurf	Yoon, Myeong-hwan	South Korea
Damage	PGE	Ngo, Evan	United States
Damage	Ryan	Michael Lawless, Ryan	United States
Support	KiWii	Ryan, Willem	United Kingdom
Support	Scyle	Broström, Simon	Sweden

Head coach

Caleb "McGravy" McGarvey

Assistant coach(es)

Ethan "Cap" Walker, Robin "Zei" Sidhu

Legend:
- (I) Inactive
- (S) Suspended
- Substitute
- (injured) Injury / Illness

Latest roster transaction: September 30, 2026.
