= Reignover =

South Korean League of Legends coach and former player

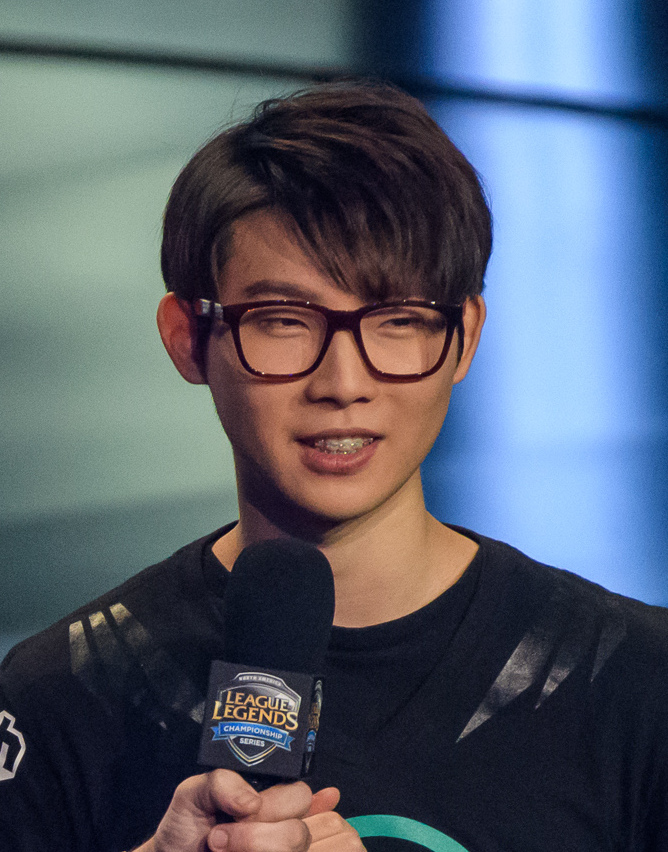
- Kim in 2016

Personal information
- Name: 김의진 (Kim Yeu-jin)
- Born: July 4, 1995 (age 31)
- Nationality: South Korean

Career information
- Games: League of Legends
- Role(s): Coach; Jungler (formerly)

Team history

As player:
- 2013–2014: Incredible Miracle
- 2015: Fnatic
- 2015–2016: Immortals
- 2016–2017: Team Liquid
- 2017–2018: Counter Logic Gaming

As coach:
- 2019: Cloud9 Academy
- 2020–2021: Cloud9
- 2022: MAD Lions

Career highlights and awards
- 2× LEC champion; 1× LCS champion (1× MVP)

Kim Yeu-jin (Korean: 김의진), better known as Reignover, is a South Korean League of Legends coach and former professional player. He played for Fnatic of the EU LCS during most of the 2015 season as their jungler. While on Fnatic, he won 2 EU LCS championships and placed third at the 2015 World Championship. After leaving Fnatic, he played for Immortals of the NA LCS in 2016 season, Team Liquid in 2017, and Counter Logic Gaming in 2018.

Reignover was named MVP of the 2016 NA LCS Spring Split while he was a member of Immortals.

In 2019, he joined Cloud9 as a coach. In 2020, he was promoted to head coach of Cloud9. He stepped down as head coach before the start of the 2021 LCS Summer Split and formally left the organization at the end of the season. He joined MAD Lions at the beginning of 2022 as a positional coach.

== Tournament results ==
=== Fnatic ===
- 1st — 2015 EU LCS Spring
- 3rd–4th — 2015 Mid-Season Invitational
- 1st — 2015 EU LCS Summer
- 3rd–4th — 2015 League of Legends World Championship

=== Immortals ===
- 3rd — 2016 Spring NA LCS
- 3rd — 2016 Summer NA LCS
