= LP Recharge =

2013 video game

- Developers: Kuuluu Interactive Entertainment; Machine Shop co. (distributors)
- Composer: Linkin Park
- Engine: Unity
- Platforms: Internet, Android, Apple Store
- Release: Facebook; September 12, 2013
- Genres: free-to-play, action-puzzle
- Mode: Single-player with multiplayer interaction

LP Recharge, also known as Linkin Park Recharge, is a 2013 free-to-play action-puzzle game, developed by Swiss studio Kuuluu Interactive Entertainment, which is composed by American rock band Linkin Park. The game was released on September 12, 2013, as it is a current playable game on Facebook. The game is focused on solving puzzles and also attempting to raise awareness about parts of the world that do not have reliable power.

== History ==
The game was announced on June 20, 2012; almost a year before the release of the game. A trailer was launched for the game in late August 2013. The game had 30,000 gamers in its first day. An official single by the band and electro house musician Steve Aoki, entitled "A Light That Never Comes", was unlocked by collecting 10 million MWh total in the game by the gamers on September 16, 2013. The single is also the opening track, along with a Rick Rubin reboot as the closing track, for the band's second remix album Recharged.

== Game story ==
Screenshot from LP Recharge

The game allows player to become a hero to save the world from the hybrids. LP Recharge takes place in a not-too-distant future where humans have depleted all natural resources on the planet. Society and what little energy stores remain have been seized control of by machines and an elite minority. Players join cooperatively to battle their captors and recharge the world with clean, sustainable energy. LP Recharge will be made available to play through Facebook (as long as the user has the Unity Web Player plugin installed).

Energy poverty and sustainable energy are critically important to co-developer Linkin Park. Launched in 2005, their non-profit charity organization Music for Relief provides aid to people affected by natural disasters and supports environmental and clean energy projects. Music for Relief's current environmental program, Power the World, was created to bring attention to the 1.3 billion people worldwide whose lack of electricity compromises their health, safety, education, and livelihoods. The social game LP Recharge brings attention to energy poverty and clean energy solutions.

== Music ==
The game featured music given by the band, although no official soundtrack was released in promotion of the game (just like what happened with the 8-Bit Rebellion! soundtrack). The music featured in the game was based on the themes of various songs by the band, and some from Recharged.

== LP Recharge event at Microsoft Loft ==
An event for the game was held at Microsoft Loft for the promotion of the game. Mike Shinoda, Joe Hahn and Dave Farrell were present at the event, playing the game and talking about how good the game is. The band members also had a talk on their new single, which was released after the success in the game.

== LP Recharge - Wastelands ==
The game was released in another name and enhanced features on the date of release of the band's new promotional single "Wastelands", which appeared on their sixth studio album The Hunting Party.
