= Dardoch =

American professional esports player

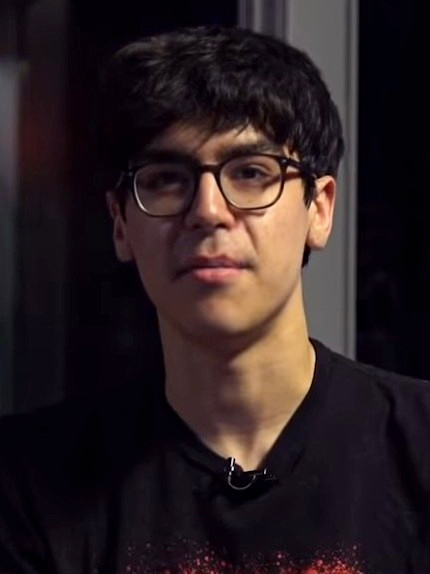
- Dardoch in 2018

Personal information
- Name: Joshua Hartnett
- Born: 1997 or 1998 (age 28–29)
- Nationality: American

Career information
- Game: League of Legends
- Playing career: 2014–present
- Role: Jungler

Team history
- 2014: Noble Truth
- 2014–2015: affNity
- 2015: Escalate Legion Gaming
- 2015: Storm
- 2015: Magnetic
- 2015: Team Imagine
- 2016: Team Liquid Academy
- 2016–2017: Immortals
- 2017: Counter Logic Gaming
- 2017–2018: Echo Fox
- 2018–2019: OpTic Gaming
- 2019–2020: Team SoloMid
- 2020–2021: Dignitas
- 2026–: Dignitas

Joshua Hartnett, better known as Dardoch (/ˈdɑːrˌdɒk/), is an American professional League of Legends player. He was named Rookie of the Split for the 2016 NA LCS Spring Split.

== Early life ==
Dardoch grew up in Bethlehem, Pennsylvania, with his parents and brother. He started playing League of Legends as a form of escapism from his life.

When I was in sophomore year, I got really, really good at League and I stopped caring so much about school because esports was kind of blowing up [...] My brother helped me convince my parents to let me play in Challenger Series, and then... Yeah, that's been my life ever since.

— Dardoch, Eyes on Dardoch

== Career ==
=== 2016 ===
Dardoch started off his career in the LCS in 2016 as the starting jungler for Team Liquid, where in the Spring Split he won Rookie of the Year and Third All-Pro Team. That split, Dardoch averaged the highest amount of kills of any jungler at 3.18. Team Liquid ended the regular season in fourth place, where their playoff run was ended in the semi-finals by Counter Logic Gaming in a 3–2 series.

It was announced that Dardoch was suspended on 27 May 2016, but Team Liquid co-CEO Steve Arhancet revealed that the suspension had been effective since 18 May 2016. Coach Locodoco cited behavioral problems, both in dynamic matchmaking and towards his own teammates and staff. The behavioral issues towards his teammates sparked between the Spring and Summer split, where team went to South Korea to bootcamp. In the documentary Breaking Point, Dardoch is seen repeatedly criticizing his teammates and coach, blaming them for holding the team back.

On August 30, 2016, it was announced that Dardoch had been released by Team Liquid. Following his departure, it was rumored that he had joined Echo Fox, but he subsequently joined Immortals on December 7, 2016.

=== 2017 ===
Dardoch began the 2017 Spring Split playing for Immortals. Despite the team finishing the split in seventh place and not qualifying for playoffs, Dardoch was voted for the Second All-Pro Team, higher than what he received in the 2016 Spring Split.

For the 2017 Summer Split, Dardoch was traded to Counter Logic Gaming. Immortal's coach Robert Yip stated that Dardoch was difficult to work with, but he has also shown potential for being the best player in the League. Immortals owner Noah Whinston stated that the trade was due to “internal issues and personality clashes”, and while not explicitly naming anybody, it was well understood that he was referring to Dardoch.

Counter Logic Gaming was performing very well in the Summer Split, obtaining a 10–3 record, but on 25 July 2017 it was announced that Dardoch would be rejoining Team Liquid. Counter Logic Gaming had been running a six-man roster with jungler OmarGod acting as a mentor for Dardoch, but the behavior problems persisted enough that the trade became necessary. The stated reason for the trade was very direct, saying Dardoch was "unwilling to adhere to the set of standards expected of every member of the team.” Team Liquid had a record of 4–10 when Dardoch rejoined, and they ended the split in ninth place with a 4–14 record. Dardoch received a single vote for Third All-Pro Team.

=== 2018 ===
For the 2018 Spring Split, Dardoch was signed to Echo Fox. With being the most traded and controversial player in the League, many believed that this opportunity would be Dardoch's last shot to prove himself. During his time on Echo Fox, Dardoch became an All-Star jungler, earning a spot on the 2018 NA LCS Spring All-Pro Team. Dardoch averaged the most kills and assists of any jungler that split, with the 2.05 kills and 7.32 assists. Echo Fox had ended the Spring Split in second place with a 12–4 record, being knocked out of the playoffs in the semi-finals by eventual split winner Team Liquid. Dardoch reflected on his past behavior in an interview, stating himself "I was a really bad teammate, and I was really immature.”

The Summer Split was still a successful one, but not as great as the Spring Split. With still no rumors of behavior issues from Dardoch, Echo Fox ended the split in fourth place with a 10–8 record. Dardoch was voted for Second All-Pro Team, and also received five votes for split MVP.

On December 4, OpTic Gaming announced they had signed Dardoch, in addition to their earlier jungler signing of Meteos on November 27. With Optic Gaming having two star junglers, it was a question as to how they would split time between the two players.

=== 2019 ===
The 2019 Spring Split saw Meteos playing starting more than Dardoch, with Meteos playing 12 games versus Dardoch playing 6 in the LCS. From the perspective of Dardoch, however, this was not much of an issue. Dardoch in an interview stated that Optic Gaming is the best team atmosphere he has been on, which he attributes to his freedom to shot-call and show off his champion pool. Dardoch's ability to show off his champion pool is proven by him playing five different champions in the six games he played in the LCS.

The 2019 Summer Split saw Dardoch benched from the main roster, playing in the Academy League for the entire split. The academy roster finished seventh with a 7-11 roster. Dardoch was briefly signed to Immortals, a team which would be rejoining the LCS in 2020, but Dardoch was signed as the starting jungler for TSM in November 2019.

=== 2020 ===
The 2020 Spring Split saw Dardoch performing at his same form, finishing the split on TSM in fifth place with a record of 9–9. He averaged the second most assists of any jungler at 6.39, right behind Spring Split MVP Blaber, who was a part of the most dominant LCS roster of all time. TSM was eliminated from the playoffs in the second round, losing 2–3 against FlyQuest.

During the off-season between the Spring and Summer Split, there were rumors that Dardoch was going to be traded to another team. On 11 May 2020, Leena Xu, president of TSM, was heard on livestream saying “That’s not up to me, like for example, no one wants to pick up Dardoch. That’s not my fault”. This leak became a massive controversy in the League of Legends Esports scene for multiple reasons, one main reason being the fact that this severely hurts Dardoch's leverage when negotiating with other teams, as they now know that Dardoch has no value on the market. Leena Xu and TSM CEO Andy Dinh would release public statements addressing the situation, but Dardoch would later state in an interview that Leena Xu never personally apologized, only Andy Dinh reached out to him to admit a mistake was made.

Dardoch signed with Team Dignitas on 26 May 2020. Team Dignitas ended the 2020 Summer Split in eight place with a record of 5–13. Despite his team's poor performance, Dardoch held the fourth highest average kills among junglers at 2.92 kills a game.

=== 2021 ===
Dardoch continued his role as Dignitas's starting jungler for the 2021 Spring Split. The team finished with a record of 11–7, good enough for fifth. Dardoch also earned a spot on the 3rd LCS All-Pro Team.

Dardoch would continue as the teams starting jungler for the 2021 Summer Split but was controversially benched on June 18 and would be replaced by Akkadian for the team's upcoming game against TSM. A week later, he was formally cut by the team and became a free agent. In a video regarding the release, Dignitas’ director of esports James Baker cited an incident that occurred after a loss that would eventually lead to his departure from the team.

Dardoch joined Immortals as an assistant coach in July.

=== 2026 ===
After several splits of coaching and playing in the Tier 2 scene, Dardoch returned to the LCS by re-joining Team Dignitas for the 2026 Summer Split.
