= Kyedae =

Canadian online streamer (born 2001)

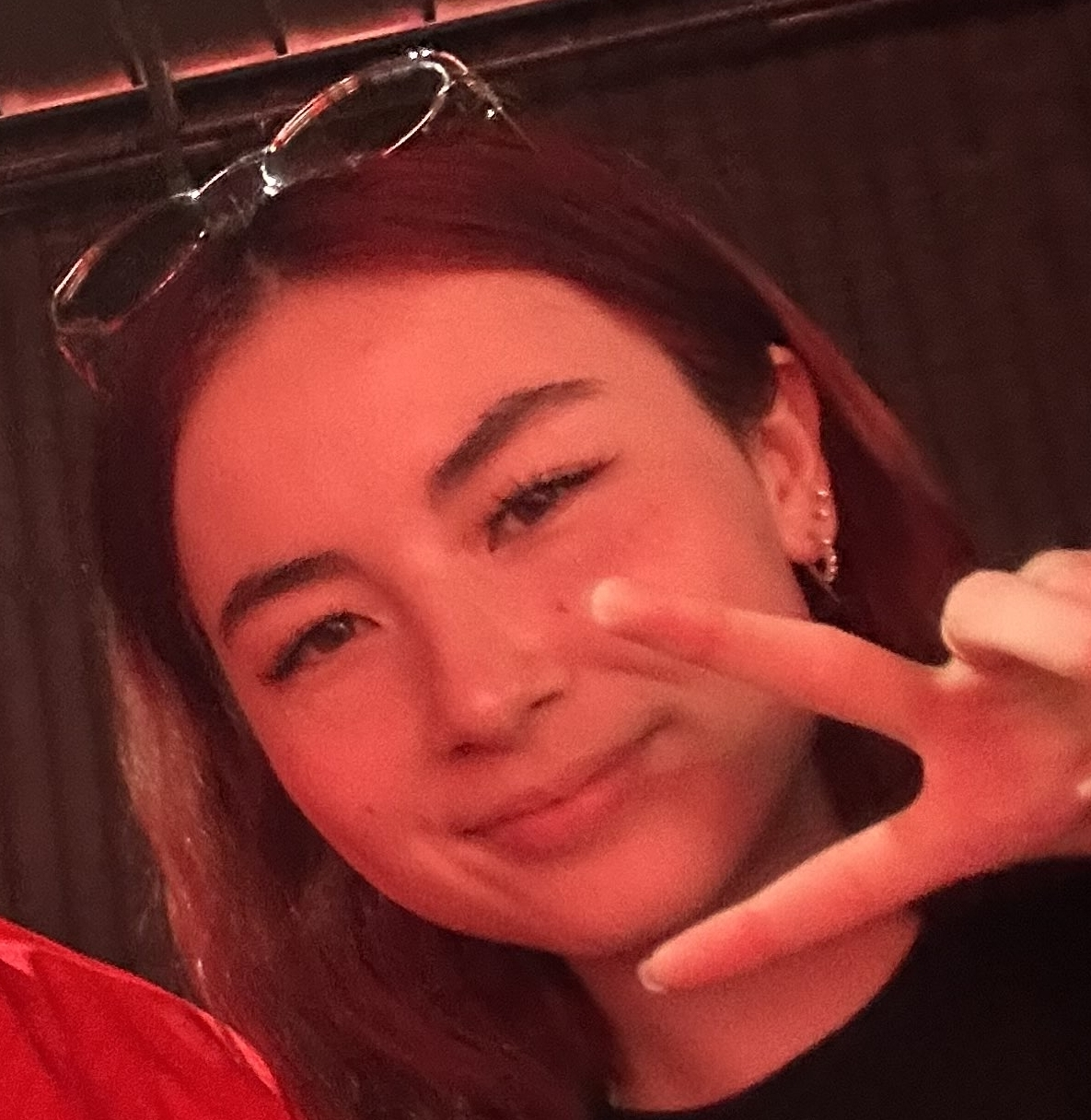
- Kyedae in April 2025
- Born: Kyedae Alisha Shymko; December 1, 2001 (age 24); Nanaimo, Canada
- Occupation: Online streamer
- Years active: 2020–2025; 2026–present
- Organization: 100 Thieves (2021–2024)
- Partner: TenZ (2019–2025)

Twitch information
- Channel: Kyedae
- Followers: 3.1 million

YouTube information
- Channel: Kyedae
- Subscribers: 1.46 million
- Last updated: April 13, 2025

Kyedae Alisha Shymko (born December 1, 2001), known mononymously as Kyedae, is a Canadian online streamer and YouTuber who is primarily known for creating Valorant content. She was named Best Valorant Streamer at the 2022 Streamer Awards.

== Early life ==
Kyedae spent her childhood in Canada and Japan. Her mother is Japanese, and her father is Ukrainian-Canadian. She speaks fluent Japanese and English.

While attending high school in Canada, she was introduced to PC gaming by Tyson Ngo, who would later become the professional esports player TenZ.

== Career ==
Kyedae began streaming on Twitch on October 31, 2020. In less than a year, Kyedae gained a significant following, amassing 172,000 subscribers on YouTube and acquiring 288,000 followers on Twitch. Kyedae's big break came when she was featured on the front page of Twitch, significantly boosting her follower count. She became known for her entertaining streams and collaborations with other popular streamers.

In April 2021, Kyedae joined the American esports organization 100 Thieves as a content creator, becoming their first international streamer. Her tenure with 100 Thieves lasted three years, during which she participated in many videos for the organization's YouTube channel and maintained a regular streaming schedule.

On March 11, 2023, Kyedae won the Best Valorant Streamer award at the 2022 Streamer Awards. On March 28, 2023, Kyedae was announced as a member of Disguised's Game Changers roster, designated as the 'Controller and Sentinel flex.' Other members of the team include content creators Jodi "QuarterJade" Lee and Sydney "Sydeon" Parker, along with Tenzin "tenzin" Dolkar. Former Immortals player Lydia "tupperware" Wilson serves as the in-game leader, with Corey "Ruin" Hartog fulfilling the role of coach.

On January 23, 2024, Kyedae announced her departure from 100 Thieves.

On April 17, 2025, Kyedae announced that she would be taking an indefinite hiatus from streaming. She returned to streaming on October 20, 2026.

== Personal life ==
Kyedae attended Dover Bay Secondary School in Nanaimo, B.C., graduating in 2019, along with her ex-fiancé TenZ.

Besides Valorant, Kyedae also streams real-life activities such as cooking, PC building, and traveling, often featured her ex-partner TenZ and her sister Sakura. She owns two dogs with TenZ but is allergic to cats.

Kyedae was in a long-term relationship with Canadian professional Valorant player and streamer Tyson "TenZ" Ngo; on August 16, 2022, Kyedae announced her engagement to TenZ.In February 2026, Kyedae confirmed that she and Ngo had ended their engagement and separated.

=== Health ===
On March 3, 2023, Kyedae announced via Twitter that she had been diagnosed with acute myeloid leukemia, a type of cancer affecting the blood and bone marrow. In September 2023, Kyedae revealed that she was officially off chemotherapy, although her treatment was not yet fully complete. In October 2026, Kyedae announced that she was in remission, but underwent laparoscopic surgery after being diagonosed with endometriosis.

== Awards and nominations ==
Year	Ceremony	Category	Result	Ref.
2022	12th Streamy Awards	Streamer of the Year	Nominated	
2022	The Streamer Awards	Best Valorant Streamer	Won	
2023	The Streamer Awards	Gamer of the Year	Nominated	

== Filmography ==
=== Music videos ===
Year	Title	Artist(s)	Ref.
2022	"Car Crash"	eaJ	
2022	"Memories"	Yungblud and Willow Smith	
