= Apex Gaming =

Professional League of Legends team

- Short name: APX
- Game: League of Legends
- Founded: January 20, 2016
- Folded: September 26, 2016
- League: NA LCS
- Location: United States
- Owner: Dignitas

Apex Gaming was a League of Legends team that competed in the North American League of Legends Championship Series (NA LCS). The team was coached primarily by Brandon "Saintvicious" DiMarco and David "Cop" Roberson. Apex Gaming also had a League of Legends Challenger Series team called Apex Pride, which entered the league after Team Dignitas transferred their spot. Apex was acquired by the Philadelphia 76ers in 2016 and merged with Dignitas.

== History ==
Apex Gaming was formed on January 20, 2016, after acquiring Team Imagine's spot in the 2016 NACS Spring Split. After placing first in the regular season and playoffs, Apex qualified for the 2016 NA LCS Summer Split promotion tournament. There, Apex defeated Team Dragon Knights in the qualifying round to earn a spot in the NA LCS. On July 8, 2016, support player Kevin "KonKwon" Kwon retired from professional gaming. The team finished with a record of 8–10, which earned them a seventh-place finish. On September 26, 2016, the Philadelphia 76ers announced their purchase of Apex and Dignitas, another esports organization. The Apex Gaming roster was then announced to be playing under the Dignitas banner.

== Final roster ==
Nat.	ID	Name	Role
(South Korea)	Ray	Jeon Ji-won	Top Laner
(South Korea)	Shrimp	Lee Byeong-hoon	Jungler
(South Korea)	Keane	Lae-Young Jang	Mid Laner
(United States)	Apollo	Apollo Price	Bot Laner
(United States)	Xpecial	Alex Chu	Support

== Tournament results ==
- 1st — 2016 Summer NA CS
- 7th — 2016 NA LCS season
