= LMQ (esports) =

Former esports team

- Game: League of Legends
- Founded: July 5, 2013
- Folded: December 26, 2014
- Head coach: Kim "Fly" Sang-chul
- Manager: Xiaowei "Sharon" Li
- General manager: Alex "Superrrman" Gu

LMQ was a League of Legends team. It was founded in China in 2013 as a sister team to Royal Club and competed in the League of Legends Pro League. On December 15, 2013, the team moved to North America to compete in the North American League of Legends Championship Series (NA LCS). The team later changed its name to Team Impulse.

== History ==
LMQ was formed on July 5, 2013, after merging portions of the rosters of Team Livemore and Royal Club Tian Ci: Dreams, F1sh, and Wayoff from the former; Mor, NoName, TS, XiaoWeiXiao, and PandaB from the latter. LMQ competed in the summer split of the 2013 LPL; despite taking a game off the Season 3 runner-up Royal Club, LMQ finished with a disappointing 8–13 record in sixth place.

In November 2013, after the Season 3 World Championship, F1sh and PandaB moved to LMQ's sister team, Royal Club. At that month's National Electronic Sports Tournament, LMQ went 2–1 in the tournament's group stage after downing CC Club and Team WE Academy while falling to the parent Team WE. In the bracket stage, LMQ lost 1–2 to the tournament favorite and eventual winner OMG, but rebounded in a 2–0 victory against Royal Club in the third place match.

On December 15, 2013, LMQ left its parent organization Tian Ci and obtained a new sponsor in iBUYPOWER. With the assistance of its new sponsor, LMQ moved to North America to take advantage of the superior esports infrastructure. At this point, Dreams and Wayoff left the team, to be replaced by Royal Club top laner GoDlike, who renamed to ackerman.

In January 2014, LMQ made their way atop the North American 5v5 Challenger tier and earned an invite to the official Riot-sponsored Challenger Series, also known as the Coke League. In their North American debut, LMQ went 8-0 and beat compLexity. Black 2–0 in the finals. By finishing first, LMQ received 9 Challenger Series Points and earned a berth in the second series. There, in March, LMQ went 4–1 on their way to a 2–0 win in the finals against Cloud 9 Tempest, thus clinching the top overall seed in the Challenger Series playoffs to be held later in the season.

While competing in the second Challenger Series, LMQ was also offered an invite to the North American Challenger League (NACL) Season 2 Qualifiers, where they went undefeated and secured a spot in the league. During the league's regular season, LMQ went 18-4 without a losing record against any team. During the March playoffs, LMQ defeated Cloud 9 Tempest 2–1 in the semifinals and moved on to face Team 8 in the tournament's grand finals. LMQ won the final series 3-1 and became NACL champions.

After having secured a spot in the semi-finals of the Challenger Series playoffs due to their tremendous number of points accumulated from both Challenger Series, LMQ went on to defeat Curse Academy in a 2–0 victory sending them to the finals against the tough Cloud 9 Tempest. After an initial loss in the best of five series, LMQ came back winning two in a row to make the series 2–1. Cloud 9 Tempest however, bounced back in game four to tie up the series 2-2. After a very low-kill game game five, Cloud 9 Tempest attempt to make a pick, but instead gets nearly aced and losing the game to LMQ. LMQ left the Challenger Series playoffs with a 5–2 record and went home with the grand prize of $16,000.

In April 2014, LMQ secured a spot for the 2014 NA LCS Summer Split after beating XDG Gaming 3–0 in the 2014 Season Summer Promotion Tournament.

=== 2015 Preseason ===
On November 24, 2014, Alex Gu announced that LMQ's 2015 roster would include XiaoWeiXiao once again and that Popstar Adrian had signed with the team as their new support player.

On December 26, 2014, LMQ announced it was rebranding to Team Impulse.

== Tournament results ==
- 6th – 2013 Summer LPL
- 1st – NA Challenger Series 2014 Spring Series 2
- 1st – NA Challenger Series 2014 Spring Playoffs
- 2nd – 2014 Summer NA LCS Round Robin
- 3rd – 2014 Summer NA LCS playoffs
- 12/13th – 2014 League of Legends World Championship
