= Team 8 =

- Game: League of Legends
- Founded: December 26, 2013
- Folded: October 7, 2015
- League: NA LCS
- Chairman: Clinton Foy
- CEO: Noah Whinston

Team 8 was a professional League of Legends team that competed in the North American League of Legends Championship Series. On October 7, 2015, Team 8's spot was acquired by Immortals, which began competing under the new name starting with the 2016 Spring LCS.

== History ==
=== 2013 ===
Team 8 formed in December 2013 with RicheRich, Guess8, chu8, Slooshi, and Dodo8. At their first event, the Razer League of Legends Holiday Bash, the team took second out of a field of 256, only dropping a set to Team LoLPro. Two weeks later, esports news site ALTGG offered to sponsor the newly formed team.

At the end of Season 3, Team 8 finished in the top 20 of the North American 5v5 Challenger Tier, and were thus offered an invite to the North American Challenger Series, also known as the Coke League after its sponsor. Unfortunately, the morning of their group semifinals match against vVv Red, top laner RicheRich left the team without warning. Team 8 was therefore forced to forfeit the game and exit early from the tournament.

After a month of searching for replacement players, Team 8 found ex-League Championship Series AD carry frommaplestreet and challenger player CaliforniaTrlolz. With the addition of frommaplestreet, Slooshi moved to mid lane and chu8 became the team's substitute. With their new roster, Team 8 competed in the second season of the North American Challenger League (NACL). Team 8 opened the season with an impressive 12–4 record, including a win against former LPL team LMQ. Despite a relatively disappointing end to the season, Team 8 finished first in the Elder Lizard Conference and tied for second overall with a record of 14–8, holding the conference tiebreaker against Cloud9 Tempest. During the NACL playoffs, Team 8 first played Team LoLPro and prevailed with a 2-0 set, and then fell to LMQ 1–3 to finish second and receive US$5000.

=== 2015 ===
For the second series of the Coke League, Team 8 again qualified and earned a spot in the quarterfinals, where they fell to LMQ 0–2. The team was known for its unique, top-lane-carry-centered play style.

Team 8 finished 8th in the Summer LCS and failed to make the playoffs.

On October 7, 2015, it was announced a new organization called Immortals would be acquiring the Team 8 spot. On October 14 Dodo8 announced his retirement and moved to a management position in Immortals.

The group is headed by a team of investors which includes Peter Levin, the president or Lionsgate Interactive Venture and Games, who co-founded Nerdist; Allen Debevoise, a chairman at Machinima.com; Steve Kaplan, a co-owner of the NBA's Memphis Grizzlies; Honest Co. CEO Brian Lee, entertainment industry venture capitalists Machine Shop Ventures, and others.
