= Adrian (gamer) =

American professional esports player

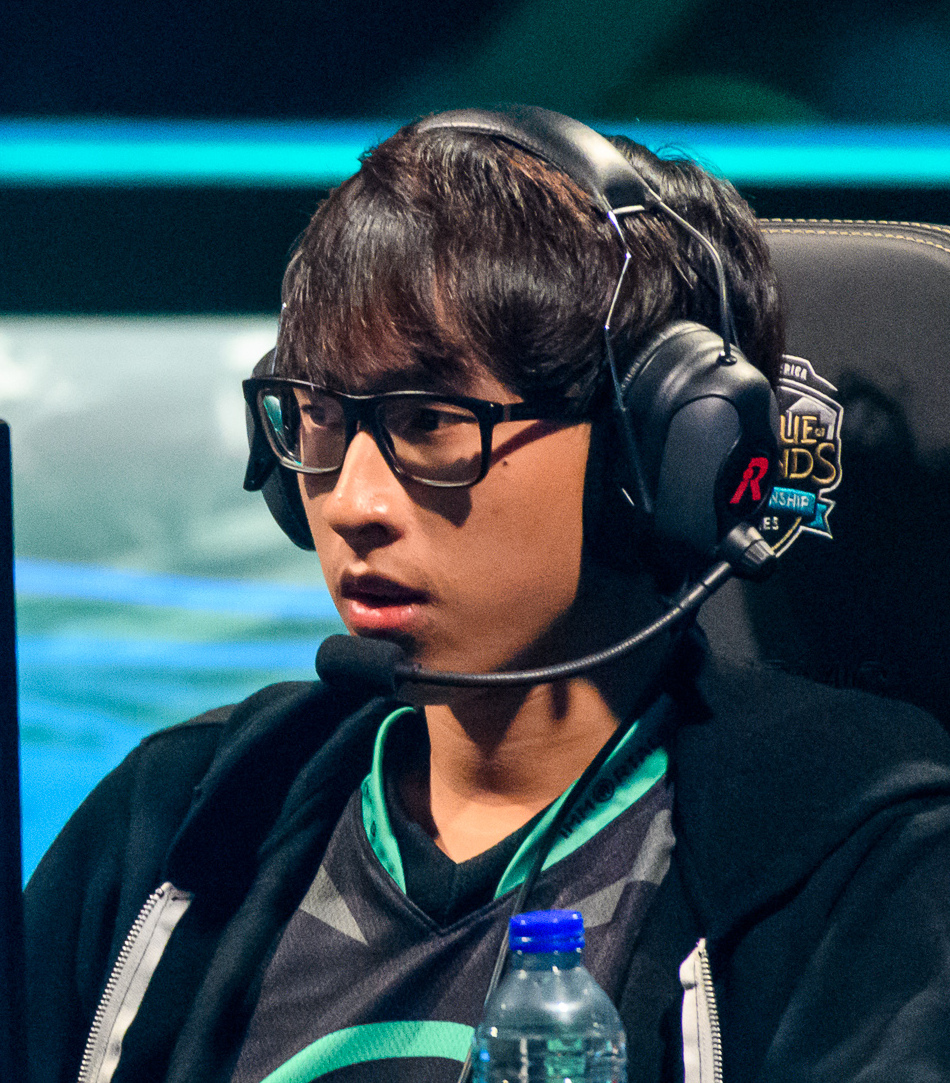
- Ma in 2016

Personal information
- Name: Adrian Ma
- Born: 1996 or 1997 (age 28–29); Houston, Texas
- Nationality: American

Career information
- Game: League of Legends
- Playing career: 2014–2018
- Role: Support

Team history
- 2014: XDG Gaming
- 2014–2015: Team Impulse
- 2015–2016: Immortals
- 2016–2017: Phoenix1
- 2017: Team Liquid
- 2017: Team Dignitas
- 2017–2018: Echo Fox

Adrian Ma, better known mononymously as Adrian, is a retired American professional League of Legends player who was most recently the support for Echo Fox of the LCS. He graduated from high school early at age 17 to attend the first varsity college esports team in the world, the program at Robert Morris University Illinois. Adrian has also played for XDG Gaming and Team Impulse.

On July 18, 2015, he temporarily stepped down from his role on the starting roster of Team Impulse. In December 2015, the newly formed NA LCS team Immortals announced they had acquired Adrian, however, after a poor performance in both the Spring and Summer playoffs for the NA LCS, Immortals announced his release in late 2016. Furthermore, it was announced that he would be playing the 2017 spring campaign for the NA LCS team Phoenix1. Later in 2017, he switched first to Team Liquid and then to Team Dignitas. He played the 2018 season for Echo Fox, before retiring from professional League of Legends after being released from the team.

== Tournament results ==
=== Team Impulse ===
- 4th — 2015 NA LCS Spring playoffs
- 4th — 2015 NA LCS Summer playoffs

=== Immortals ===
- 1st — 2016 NA LCS Spring Round Robin
- 3rd — 2016 NA LCS Spring Playoffs
- 2nd — 2016 NA LCS Summer regular season

=== Phoenix1 ===
- 3rd — 2017 NA LCS Spring

=== Echo Fox ===
- 3rd — 2018 NA LCS Spring
