= Machine Shop co. =

American entertainment company

- Industry: Entertainment
- Founded: 2012; 14 years ago (as company); 2015; 11 years ago (as Venture Capital)
- Founder: Linkin Park
- Headquarters: Beverly Hills, California, United States
- Products: Video games, Music industry, Ventures
- Website: Machine Shop co.

Machine Shop co. (commonly called Machine Shop or Linkin Park Inc.) is an American entertainment company that markets itself as a venture capital firm, event provider, supporter and lifestyle company. It was started as a music company by Linkin Park bandmates Mike Shinoda and Brad Delson in December 2012. Later on, it became a venture capital firm in January 2015. It was established as a joint company of music companies, "Chesterchaz Publishing" (Chester Bennington), "Big Bad Mr. Hahn Music" (Brad Delson and Joe Hahn), "Nondisclosure Agreement Music" (Dave Farrell), "Rob Bourdon Music" (Rob Bourdon) and "Kenji Kobayashi Music" (Mike Shinoda). In an independent study released on August 14, 2015, CB Insights recognized Machine Shop as the seventh most invested company by any celebrity. The company reached the mark due to major investments in Lyft, Blue Bottle Coffee Company and Shyp.

== History ==
=== 2012-2014: Founding ===
Mike Shinoda founded the music company to make the company one of the parent companies of Machine Shop Records with Access Industries and Warner Bros. The company made its first appearance in 2013, when it was an event provider for Concert for Philippines. The company was later a supporter for the online-based game LP Recharge and produced its first musical work in the form of Recharged as a parent company. In December 2013, the company had partnered with Japanese company BeatRobo to provide a platform known as PlugAir, but the software gained popularity in Asia when Hamasaki Ayumi released two hit singles, "Terminal" and "XOXO", on the PlugAir platform.

=== 2015-Present: Ventures ===
When the North American leg of Linkin Park's The Hunting Party Tour was cancelled, the free time was utilised for thinking about the venture. On January 1, Shinoda and the band opened Machine Shop Ventures, part of the same Machine Shop brand that houses the rest of the band's empire. Mike and Brad went to visit Y Combinator, the influential startup incubator, where they met with Michael Seibel, cofounder of Justin.tv and a partner at YC. Seibel spent much of his time giving Shinoda and co. a crash course in startup investing 101: equity vs. convertible notes, the average size of an angel investment, what he calls the "norms". Seibel explained the experience as,

To me, it was impressive in and of itself that they came up here and spent the time to dig in, as opposed to the first move being to cut a check. The band seemed to internalize that message. Rather than invest their considerable resources in a mishmash of businesses, they focused on startups that reflected their personal interests — areas like stock picking, which Shinoda has done since buying Apple. Hence the investment in Robinhood, a stock trading app that waives all fees to compete with E-Trade.

— Michael Seibel

Later the band had meeting with Anita Elberse and three of her students at Harvard Business School. The band learned that they need to build a diverse "brand ecosystem" and "diversify revenue streams" across several businesses to reduce financial risk in case something doesn't stick. The Harvard study also suggest that the band "partner with a broader community or network of global influencers to remain tapped into bleeding-edge cultural trends." This later provided the company to team up with new partners such as Lyft, Blue Bottle Coffee Company, and Shyp, and old partners such as BeatRobo, Open Labs, and Turnstile.

== Events ==
=== Concert for the Philippines ===
The company's goal for the event was to design identity for Music for Relief's Concert for the Philippines. It designed Concert for the Philippines branding, resulting in $500K raised for Typhoon Haiyan disaster relief. It also crafted look and feel of entire event from fliers to stage design, signage and live TV broadcast. The company Created exclusive concert for the Philippines memorabilia including gold bracelet, poster and apparel. It worked with artists like Linkin Park, Bad Religion, American rock band Heart and The Offspring in the event.

=== Sunset Strip Music Festival ===
The company had set a goal of rebranding the festival to appeal to a younger, more informed demographic. There was a creative brand identity for entire music festival. It consulted Music for Relief on festival on booth activation, resulting in 3x increase in funds raised.

=== The Mall art show ===
In 2014, Machine Shop worked with Red Bull and Good Smile company and put up an art show named as "Beast Astray", an art exhibit inspired by the motion picture, Mall.

=== BAPE ===
The company collaborated with A Bathing Ape for support of Linkin Park's Asia tour. They collaborated with Warner Bros. Japan to promote Linkin Park's DVD release.As a result, they sold out all three models of custom, co-branded T-shirts. They generated region specific press in East Asia.

=== Sebago event activation ===
The company collaborated with Sebago to design a boot inspired by Linkin Park tour crew. The event took place at Reed Space in New York City.

== Other works ==
=== PlugAir ===
PlugAir is a software platform created by the company as a solution to combat copyright infringement. They partnered with Japan-based cloud storage startup, rebranding it to increase brand awareness in non-Japanese markets. They redesigned PlugAir device and packaging. It also facilitated distribution of 5,000+ units to the Link Park community and created video content for marketing and promotional purposes. They accompanied CEO to WebSummit in Dublin to present to potential investors and partners.

They recently collaborated with Beatrobo to release Hamasaki Ayumi's two hit singles Terminal and XOXO on the PlugAir platform.

=== Infinity ===
The company collaborated with Harman International Industries to invigorate the Infinity brand through the design and launch of a new line of audio products. A 2014 documentary film, The Distortion of Sound, which features Shinoda, was also released in support of Infinity. They announced partnership at CES 2014 and designed Infinity One portable speaker with Harman International's Hong Kong based creative studio. They also won CES 2014 Innovations Design Award for the work done for music. They consulted kbs+ and Edelman on marketing/PR rollout plan.

=== Project Spark ===
The company collaborated with Microsoft to utilize the new Xbox gaming engine to create the first-ever custom Project Spark music video for Linkin Park's Guilty All The Same single release. It worked closely with Microsoft game development team, Project Spark, to modify the Project Spark creative tool kit. They generated over 2.7 million YouTube views. They featured "Guilty All The Same" on the Xbox home page to release the video.They created an in-game crowdsourcing experience of "remixing" song stems.

=== 686 ===
The company collaborated with a snowboard brand 686 to develop a new snowboard jacket concept. They managed seamless collaboration with 686 Mike Shinoda. It also designed textile pattern swatch and apparel design. Joe Hahn of Linkin Park helped in film content direction and production. Video content and behind-the-scenes interview series featured on influential culture site Hypebeast. Sold out snowboard jacket at online portal for major distributor Zumiez.

=== LPBLKMRKT ===
The company collaborated with Square and developed a nontraditional way to launch The Hunting Party album and expand the merchandise retail operation.

=== Toon Workshop ===
The company collaborated with Japanese audio manufacturer Fostex and toy conglomerate Good Smile to develop new audio device brand platform. It advised on industrial design of headphone product and conducted US market competitive analysis of audio landscape analysis. They developed go-to-market strategy.

=== Power the World ===
Power the World is an organization founded by Linkin Park. The goal of the company was to create awareness for Linkin Park's clean energy initiative in partnership with the United Nations Foundation. They designed new website to effectively communicate Power The World's mission. It also created cohesion among all social media assets. It again coordinated production of Power the World video commercial, "The Story of Imani" which got 51k+ YouTube Views.

=== LP Recharge ===
LP Recharge is a Facebook game created by Kuuluu Interactive Entertainment. the goal of the company in distribution of game was to drive awareness and gameplay of LP RECHARGE Facebook game, released in line with the launch of the single A Light That Never Comes, Linkin Park's collaboration with Steve Aoki.

=== Immortals ===
Immortals is an esports/competitive video game team that was created in 2015 and funded by a group of investors that included Machine Shop co. The team currently plays in the League of Legends Championship Series North America after purchasing Team 8.

== Crew and employees ==
- Mike Shinoda - Founder, President
- Brad Delson - Founder, President
- Bill Silva - Chief Operating Officer
- Jessica Sklar - Chief Strategy Officer, Partner
- Ryan DeMarti - Director of Operations
- Trish Evangelista - Project Manager
- Lorenzo Errico - Digital Manager
