= Immortals (esports) =

American professional esports organization

- Short name: IMT
- Founded: October 7, 2015
- Location: United States (Great Lakes region)
- CEO: TBD
- Divisions: League of Legends; League of Legends: Wild Rift; Valorant
- Parent group: Immortals Gaming Club
- Website: immortals.gg

Immortals was a professional esports organization based in the United States owned by Immortals Gaming Club. It was founded on October 7, 2015, after the acquisition of Team 8's LCS spot.

Immortals applied for a franchise partnership with the LCS when the league began franchising in late 2017, but their application was declined by Riot Games due to financial concerns, despite being one of three North American teams to qualify for the 2017 World Championship. However, in mid-2019 they rejoined the LCS after their parent company, Immortals Gaming Club, bought out OpTic Gaming and their LCS spot before exiting again at the end of 2024.

Immortals previously competed in other esports titles, including Valorant, Apex Legends, Arena of Valor, Clash Royale, Counter-Strike: Global Offensive, Dota 2, Overwatch, Rainbow Six Siege, Super Smash Bros. and Vainglory.

== Ownership ==
Immortals is owned by Immortals Gaming Club, a collective esports and gaming company. Other than owning the team their name stems from, Immortals Gaming Club owns MIBR and the Los Angeles Valiant Overwatch League team. Investors for the group include Anschutz Entertainment Group, Peter Levin, the president of Lionsgate Interactive Venture and Games, who co-founded Nerdist; Allen Debevoise, former chairman at Machinima.com; Steve Kaplan, a co-owner of the NBA's Memphis Grizzlies; serial entrepreneur Brian Lee, entertainment industry venture capitalists Machine Shop Ventures; Neil Leibman, a co-owner of MLB's Texas Rangers, and others.

== League of Legends ==
On October 7, 2015, it was announced that a new esports organization called Immortals had acquired Team 8's spot in the North American League of Legends Championship Series (NA LCS). On October 14, 2015, Dodo8 announced his retirement and moved to a management position in Immortals. On December 8 it was announced that Seong "Huni" Hoon Heo, Kim "Reignover" Yeu Jin, Eugene "Pobelter" Park, Jason "WildTurtle" Tran, and Adrian "Adrian" Ma would be joining the team's inaugural roster. Of these five players, only Pobelter remained on the 2017 roster. On December 7, 2016, Joshua "Dardoch" Hartnett joined as Immortals' starting jungler, signing a three-year contract. Top laner Lee "Flame" Ho-jong and bot laner Liyu "Cody Sun" Sun joined on December 9, 2016, while support Kim "Olleh" Joo-sung was first reported as joining the team on December 12, 2016, with a press release from Immortals officially announcing his signing on the following day.

Following a seventh-place finish in the spring split, Immortals finished second in the summer regular season and advanced all the way to the summer finals, where they were defeated by Team SoloMid. Nonetheless, Immortals qualified for the 2017 World Championship by having the most championship points at the end of the summer split.

At the 2017 World Championship, Immortals were placed in Group B of the main event group stage, along with Europe's Fnatic, South Korea's Longzhu Gaming and Vietnam's GIGABYTE Marines. After losing to Fnatic in the second round robin and one of two subsequent tiebreaker matches, Immortals were knocked out of the tournament. After failing to secure a spot in the newly franchised LCS, Immortals disbanded on November 20, 2017.

In June 2019, Immortals announced that they had rejoined the LCS after their parent company, Immortals Gaming Club, bought out OpTic Gaming and their LCS spot.

In January 2022, Immortals announced a multi-year naming rights partnership with the Progressive Corporation, renaming their LCS team to Immortals Progressive.

Immortals would exit the LCS a second time at the end of the 2024 season prior to the Americas merger.

=== Current roster ===
Immortals League of Legends roster
Players	Coaches
Role / Handle / Name / Nationality	Head coach: Vacant
Legend: (I) Inactive; (S) Suspended; Substitute; (injured) Injury / Illness	Roster updated November 5, 2025.

=== Tournament results ===
- 1st — 2016 NA LCS Spring Round Robin
- 3rd — 2016 NA LCS Spring Playoffs
- 2nd — 2016 NA LCS Summer Round Robin
- 3rd — 2016 NA LCS Summer Playoffs
- 7th — 2017 NA LCS Spring Round Robin
- 2nd — 2017 NA LCS Summer Round Robin
- 2nd — 2017 NA LCS Summer Playoffs
- 8th — 2020 LCS Spring
- 10th — 2020 LCS Summer
- 7th — 2021 LCS Spring
- 7th — 2021 LCS Summer
- 5-6th — 2021 LCS Championship
- 10th — 2022 LCS Spring
- 9th — 2022 LCS Summer
- 9th — 2023 LCS Spring
- 10th — 2023 LCS Summer
- 8th — 2024 LCS Spring
- 8th — 2024 LCS Summer

== Counter-Strike: Global Offensive ==
Immortals acquired Tempo Storm's fully Brazilian lineup on June 1, 2016. The former coach of SK Gaming, Wilton "zews" Prado, replaced Gustavo "SHOOWTiME" Gonçalves on July 22, 2016. On June 21, Immortals won DreamHack Summer 2016 after beating Ninjas in Pyjamas 2–0. The team placed 3rd-4th at CyberPowerPC Summer 2016, losing to Cloud9 in the semi-finals. Immortals won Northern Arena 2016 on September 4 after they beat Cloud9 in the finals. After a disappointing showing at ESL Pro League Season 4 Finals in Brazil, Immortals replaced Wilton "zews" Prado with former teammate of boltz, Lucas "steel" Lopes. The most recent roster change involving the team was when João "felps" Vasconcellos was traded to SK Gaming in exchange for Lincoln "fnx" Lau. On January 27, 2018, the team investors acquired the MiBR branding and transferred CS:GO operations to that brand, after some months of negotiation with Paulo Velloso (former MiBR CEO), planning to come back with a Brazilian roster in the future.

=== Tournament results ===
Bold denotes a Major

- 1st — DreamHack Summer 2016
- 3rd-4th — CyberPowerPC Summer 2016
- 1st — Northern Arena 2016
- 2nd — **PGL Kraków Major 2017**
- 2nd — DreamHack Montreal 2017

== Super Smash Bros. ==
Immortals branched into Super Smash Bros. by signing the Super Smash Bros. for Wii U and Super Smash Bros. Brawl player Jason "ANTi" Bates on September 13, 2016. Three months later they signed Super Smash Bros. Melee player DaJuan "Shroomed" McDaniel, who was previously signed with Winterfox.

== Dota 2 ==
On September 13, 2017, it was announced that Immortals had acquired the North American-based independent Korean squad Team Phoenix consisting of The International 2016 MVP Phoenix roster.

On December 30, 2017, offlaner Forev announced via Twitter his departure from the team.

== Clash Royale ==
Immortals started their Clash Royale team as part of the Clash Royale League North America. The team started on August 20, 2018, as part of Season 1 of the Clash Royale League. They went 10–4 in the regular season and won the playoffs to make it the World Finals in Tokyo, Japan. They got 4th in the seeding tournament and then lost in the quarter-finals.

=== Roster ===
ID	Position
Royal	1v1
ahcraaaap	2v2
thegod_rf	2v2
LaPoKaTi	1v1
Trainer Luis	Coach

== Rainbow Six Siege ==
On June 5, 2018, the team have announced a new Rainbow Six: Siege team (the second Brazilian squad in the organization), acquiring the former team of BRK e-Sports. On August 3, the team was transferred to MiBR, an esports organization owned by Immortals.

== Overwatch ==
On July 12, 2017, Overwatch developer Activision Blizzard officially announced that Noah Whinston, CEO of the team, had acquired a Los Angeles-based Overwatch League franchise spot for an estimated $20 million, after almost a year of discussion. "For us, the crucial part of [our reason to join the Overwatch League] overall was the localization aspect — being able to have a local territory that we have control over and build deeper ties with a fan base than the current model really allows us to do," Whinston said in an interview. "That localization element, in addition the revenue sharing elements, and the stability and the strong competitive future of the game, all of those were important aspects for us when it came to making the decision."

On October 23, 2017, Immortals revealed their franchise name as the Los Angeles Valiant and transferred all Overwatch operations to that brand. The team revealed their starting roster over a series of Twitter posts from October 30 to November 2, consisting of four DPS, four tanks, and three supports.

== Valorant ==
On May 21, 2020, Immortals announced their new VALORANT team. They participated in the first season of the Challengers tier of the Valorant Champions Tour as a non-partner. The following year, in 2022, they pivoted to the VCT Game Changers. They would eventually fold all FPS titles into MiBR and continue VALORANT operations under that title.
