= Dignitas (esports) =

American esports organization

- Divisions: League of Legends; Counter-Strike: Global Offensive; Rocket League; Valorant; Fortnite; Pokémon Unite; Pokémon Trading Card Game
- Founded: 9 September 2003
- Location: Newark, New Jersey
- Owners: Harris Blitzer Sports & Entertainment
- CEO: Michael "Prindi" Prindiville
- General manager: James "Bakery" Baker
- Partners: Champion; HyperX; Verizon; SIG
- Parent group: New Meta Entertainment
- Website: dignitas.gg

Dignitas (formerly referred as Team Dignitas) is an American esports organization based in Newark, New Jersey. It was founded by Michael "ODEE" O'Dell in 2003 as a merger of two Battlefield 1942 clans. Dignitas was acquired by the Philadelphia 76ers in 2016 and is now a part of parent company Harris Blitzer Sports & Entertainment (HBSE). The team is best known for its League of Legends, Rocket League, Fortnite, and Counter-Strike: Global Offensive squads.

The organization rebranded in October 2018, dropping "Team" from its name and replacing its old "alien" logo with an owl logo. In January 2021, Dignitas once again replaced their logo, returning a modernized version of the original "alien" design and introducing it as a mascot named Digi.

== History ==
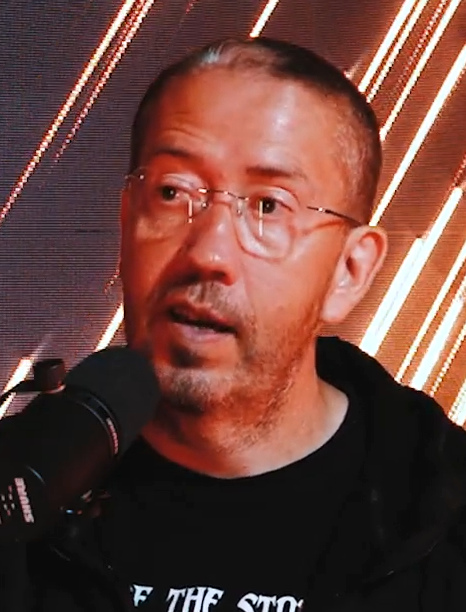
One of the organisation's founders, Michael “ODEE” O'Dell

Since the organization's inception in 2003, Dignitas have won 18 world championships and competed in 35 different titles.

=== 2003 to 2009 ===
Dignitas' first world championship came in 2005, when Chris Bullard won the FIFA Interactive World Cup.

In 2006, Dignitas' Battlefield 2 team was chosen as the Team of the Year by Geeksnet.org.

In May 2007, British Counter-Strike 1.6 news website UKCounterTerrorist.com ranked Dignitas as the number one team in Great Britain.

Freek "XeNoGeaR" Molema won the Trackmania Nations tournament and $10,000 at the 2007 Electronic Sports World Cup (ESWC).

August 2007 saw Dignitas' Enemy Territory: Quake Wars team claim victory at Quakecon 2007, taking home $22,000.

Shaun "Apollo" Clark, representing Dignitas, placed first in Command & Conquer 3: Tiberium Wars at the World Cyber Games 2007.

Dignitas' World in Conflict team was nominated for the 2007 eSports Award as "eSport Team of the Year".

At World Cyber Games 2008, Command & Conquer 3: Kane's Wrath player Pascal "Dackel" Pfefferle would win gold for Dignitas.

=== 2010–present ===
At the 2010 World Cyber Games, David "DaveySkills" Kelly won the Forza Motorsport 3 championship.

In January 2011, Dignitas player Jeffrey "SjoW" Brusi won $7,500 after placing first in the StarCraft II IEM European Tournament.

From 2010 until the organization's departure from the scene in 2016, Dignitas housed multiple TrackMania world champions. This began with Fredrik "Bergie" Bergmann's win at ESWC 2010. Then, Tim "Spam" Lunenburg and Carl-Antoni "CarlJr." Cloutier placed first and third respectively at ESWC 2012 tournament. Most notably, Carl-Antoni "CarlJr." Cloutier won three consecutive TrackMania 2 Stadium titles at ESWC 2013, 2014, and 2015.

Led by British team captain James "Bakery" Baker, Dignitas finished second at the 2015 Heroes of the Storm World Championship, and went on to win 4 of the 5 European Championships the next year.

In 2016, Dignitas was acquired by Philadelphia 76ers owners Josh Harris and David Blitzer, who merged them with Apex Gaming while keeping the Dignitas branding. Now a part of Harris Blitzer Sports & Entertainment, Dignitas formed a parent company, New Meta Entertainment, in 2019 after merging with Clutch Gaming with investments from Fertitta Entertainment, Susquehanna Private Capital, Delaware North, and Steve Rifkind.

Continuing on form in 2017, the team won IEM Katowice. In 2018, the team won the first international tournament of the year, making the team three-time IEM Katowice champions. Dignitas' Rocket League team, consisting of ViolentPanda, Turbopolsa, and Kaydop, won the RLCS Season 5 Finals in June 2018, becoming world champions. Dignitas' Counter-Strike: Global Offensive women's roster won the annual GIRLGAMER Esports Festival back-to-back in 2017 and 2018, and the Intel Extreme Challenge Katowice in 2018 and 2019.

== Battlefield 1942 ==
This Team represents all the founding Members of Dignitas.

Battlefield 1942 roster
Players
Coaches

Role	Handle	Name	Nationality
Tank	Liquide		Sweden
Assault	majsmannen		Sweden
Pilot	RaideN		Sweden
Assault	Thrasher		Germany
Pilot	Sakai		Germany
Sniper	ODEE		United Kingdom
Tank	Totti		Denmark
Tank	Cougar		Sweden
Assault	SpadEs		Sweden
Tank	kjn		Sweden
Assault	Heiner		Germany
Tank	Low-Life		Sweden
Pilot	Tagg		Sweden
Assault	Keno		Sweden
Assault	Deman		United Kingdom
Pilot	Svett		Sweden
Tank	NewmaN		Sweden
Assault	Zlaxxzor		Sweden
Assault	Zatarra		Sweden
Assault	hackbard		Germany

Head coach

majsmannen

Legend:
- (I) Inactive
- (S) Suspended
- Substitute
- (injured) Injury / Illness

== League of Legends ==
After being rejected as a franchise partner for the NA LCS in 2017, Dignitas returned to League of Legends in 2019 by acquiring Clutch Gaming. Under Dignitas' coaching staff, Clutch the team climbed from ninth place at the end of the 2019 LCS Spring Season to qualifying for Worlds 2019 as North America's third seed. After Worlds, Clutch Gaming officially rebranded under the Dignitas banner.

On 3 June 2021, Dignitas announced a naming rights deal with digital bank company "QNTMPAY". Under this four-year partnership, Dignitas' LCS and LCS Academy teams renamed to "Dignitas QNTMPAY" and "DIG QNTM Academy" respectively.

On November 16, 2026, Dignitas announced that their LCS slot would be operated by OpTic Gaming for the 2027 season as part of a partnership. While Dignitas have kept the slot, it is currently managed by Riot Games.

=== Current rosters ===
==== LCS team ====
Dignitas League of Legends roster
Players
Coaches

Role	Handle	Name	Nationality
Top	Denathor	Noah Erikson	United States
Jungle	Dardoch	Joshua Hartnett	United States
Mid	Palafox	Cristian Palafox	United States
ADC	FBI	Ian Victor Huang	Australia
Support	Ignar	Lee Dong-geun	South Korea

Head coach

Simon "Swiffer" Papamarkos

Assistant coach(es)

Emanuel "Emi" Ursachi

Legend:
- (I) Inactive
- (S) Suspended
- Substitute
- (injured) Injury / Illness

Roster updated Jun 26, 2022.

== Rocket League ==
Dignitas originally entered the Rocket League competitive scene with the pickup of the amateur North American team "Applesauce" on 23 January 2018.

On 22 May 2018, Dignitas announced that they parted ways with their North American team and signed the roster of Gale Force Esports, the defending Rocket League world champions. In February 2022, Dignitas signed NFL player Boston Scott as a content creator and substitute for their Rocket League roster.

=== Current roster ===
Dignitas Rocket League roster
Players
Coaches

Handle	Name	Nationality
ApparentlyJack	Benton, Jack	England
Fiv3Up	Seamen, Logan	United States
bora	Sari, Bora	United States
B0ston	Scott, Boston	United States

Head coach

Robert "fishhr" Waite

Legend:
- (I) Inactive
- (S) Suspended
- Substitute
- (injured) Injury / Illness

Roster updated 25 July, 2026.

== Counter-Strike: Global Offensive ==
Dignitas has fielded Counter-Strike teams since 2004, but joined the Global Offensive scene on 8 March 2013 with the signing of Torqued. Dignitas dropped this squad on 8 August 2013 and took a brief leave from the scene until 16 February 2014, when they announced their pickup of the Danish team über G33KZ. This roster achieved some notable results, including 3rd-4th-place finishes at both the EMS One Katowice 2014 and ESL One Cologne 2014 majors. This roster would later be transferred to TSM in January 2015 and ended up forming the nucleus of the Astralis squad that won four Majors, including three in a row from 2018 to 2019.

The day after the TSM transfer, Dignitas announced that they acquired the Danish roster of "Deponeret". On 19 December 2016, Dignitas mutually parted ways with this second Danish squad as well, stating "Team Dignitas and the Philadelphia 76ers are committed to building our next elite, international Counter Strike: Global Offensive team based in North America."

March 2017 saw Dignitas an international team featuring three former members of FaZe, with the roster disbanding in January 2018 after failing to qualify for the European CS:GO Minor. Later, in February 2018, Dignitas announced a North American roster, but dropped them in August after being relegated from the ESL Pro League.

Finally, in January 2020, Dignitas unveiled the signing of the ex-Ninjas in Pyjamas roster and Håkon "hallzerk" Fjærli.

On 17 August 2020, esports betting company VIE.gg acquired naming rights of Dignitas' Counter-Strike: Global Offensive team, with the team rebranding to "Dignitas VIE" and sporting an alternative red and black version of the Dignitas logo.

=== Last roster ===
Dignitas Counter-Strike: Global Offensive roster
Players
Coaches

Handle	Name	Nationality
f0rest	Lindberg, Patrik	Sweden
friberg	Friberg, Adam	Sweden
hallzerk	Fjærli, Håkon	Norway
HEAP	Alonso, Ludvig	Sweden
Lekr0	Olofsson, Jonas	Sweden
K1NG	Dill, Noah	United States

Head coach

Faruk "pita" Pita

Legend:
- (I) Inactive
- (S) Suspended
- Substitute
- (injured) Injury / Illness

Latest roster transaction: 6 October 2023.

== Valorant ==
Dignitas plunged into the Valorant scene with the signing of an all women's team on 15 May 2020. Kiara "milk" Makua left on 13 April 2021, leaving the team with only four members.

Later, the organization also signed free agent roster Homeless on 20 August 2020. Posting middling results, the team was eventually dropped on 31 March 2021.

=== Current roster ===
Dignitas Valorant roster
Players
Coaches

Handle	Name	Nationality
EMUHLEET	Garrido, Emmalee	United States
rain	Smith, Amanda	Canada
Theia	Mundorff, Melisa	United States
showliana	Maransaldi, Juliana	Brazil
Stefanie	Jones, Stefanie	United States

Head coach

- Vacant

Legend:
- (I) Inactive
- (S) Suspended
- Substitute
- (injured) Injury / Illness

Latest roster transaction: 10 May 2021.

== Fortnite ==
Dignitas would enter Fortnite esports by signing Pgod, Mero and Dukez in May 2022 to compete in the Fortnite Champion Series, the official Fortnite esports circuit that involves duos teams. The organization would sign Bugha, the winner of the 2019 Fortnite World Cup, the following year.

On April 11, 2024, it was announced that Dignitas would be competing in ESL Featuring Fortnite, a Squads-based variation of Fortnite run by ESL that is separate from the Fortnite Championship Series (f.k.a. Fortnite Champion Series).

=== Current roster ===
Dignitas Fortnite roster
Players
Coaches

Handle	Name	Nationality
Cooper	Smith, Cooper	United States
Khanada	Khim, Leon	United States
Acorn	Akhras, Abdullah	Canada
Bucke	Eschenburg, Logan	United States

Head coach

- Vacant

Legend:
- (I) Inactive
- (S) Suspended
- Substitute
- (injured) Injury / Illness

Latest roster transaction: 16 February 2024.

== Pokémon Trading Card Game ==
Dignitas entered the Pokémon Trading Card Game on the 11th of June 2026, the day before the 2026 NAIC (North American international championship), with the signing of Brent Tonisson and Rahul Reddy.

=== Current roster ===
Dignitas Pokémon roster
Players
Coaches

Handle	Name	Nationality
Rahul Reddy	Reddy, Rahul	United States
Brent Tonisson	Tonisson, Brent	Australia

Head coach

- Vacant

Legend:
- (I) Inactive
- (S) Suspended
- Substitute
- (injured) Injury / Illness

Latest roster transaction: 11 June 2026.
