= 2017 NA LCS season =

- League: NA LCS
- Sport: League of Legends
- Duration: January 20 – April 23 (Spring); June 2 – September 3 (Summer); September 8–10 (Regional finals)
- Teams: 10
- TV partner(s): Twitch, YouTube

Spring
- Champions: Team SoloMid
- Runners-up: Cloud9
- Top seed: Team SoloMid
- Season MVP: Noh "Arrow" Dong-hyeon

Summer
- Champions: Team SoloMid
- Runners-up: Immortals
- Top seed: Team SoloMid
- Season MVP: Søren "Bjergsen" Bjerg

Regional finals
- Winner: Cloud9

NA LCS seasons
- ← 2016 2018 →

The 2017 NA LCS season was the sixth season of the North American League of Legends Championship Series (NA LCS), a professional esports league for the video game League of Legends. The season was divided into two splits: Spring and Summer. The Spring Split began on January 20 and culminated with the playoff finals on April 23, 2017. The Summer Split began on June 2 and culminated with the Spring Split finals on September 3, 2017.

Team SoloMid won the spring split playoffs, qualifying them for the 2017 Mid-Season Invitational. Team SoloMid also won the summer split playoffs, directly qualifying them for the 2017 World Championship. Immortals and Cloud9 also qualified for the 2017 World Championship via Championship Points and winning the regional qualifier, respectively.

== Spring ==
The Spring Split regular season began on January 20, 2017. The regular season followed a standard double round-robin format, where each team faced every other team twice.

The bottom two teams from the regular season were relegated to the summer promotional tournament, where they competed with the top two teams from the League of Legends Challenger Series. The tournament was held from March 31 to April 2, 2017, and followed a double-elimination format. The top two teams advanced to the summer split.

The top six teams from the regular season advanced to the playoffs, a single-elimination tournament, which ran from April 8 to April 23, 2017. Of the six teams, the top two started in the semifinals, while the bottom four started in the quarterfinals. All matches were in a best-of-five format. Unlike the previous year, the top seed in the semifinals would play the lowest seed that advanced from the quarterfinals. The winner of the playoffs advanced to the 2017 Mid-Season Invitational. The Spring Split playoffs third place match and final was played at the Pacific Coliseum in Vancouver, Canada.

=== Regular season ===
Pos	Team	Pld	W	L	PCT	Qualification or relegation
1	Team SoloMid	18	15	3	.833	Advance to semifinals
2	Cloud9	18	14	4	.778	Advance to semifinals
3	Phoenix1	18	11	7	.611	Advance to quarterfinals
4	Counter Logic Gaming	18	10	8	.556	Advance to quarterfinals
5	FlyQuest	18	9	9	.500	Advance to quarterfinals
6	Dignitas	18	9	9	.500	Advance to quarterfinals
7	Immortals	18	8	10	.444	
8	Echo Fox	18	6	12	.333	
9	Team Liquid	18	5	13	.278	Promotion tournament
10	Team Envy	18	3	15	.167	Promotion tournament

Source: LoL Esports (Archived January 23, 2018, at the Wayback Machine)
Rules for classification: 1) Winning percentage; 2) head-to-head record; 3) tiebreaker match(es)

=== Promotion tournament ===
Initial Round
A1	Team Liquid	3
B2	eUnited	0
A2	Team Envy	1
B1	Gold Coin United	3
Losers Match
B2	eUnited	1
A2	Team Envy	3

First Qualification Match
Winner to 2017 Summer
A1	Team Liquid	3
B1	Gold Coin United	2
Second Qualification Match
Winner to 2017 Summer
B1	Gold Coin United	2
A2	Team Envy	3

Source: LoL Esports (Archived January 23, 2018, at the Wayback Machine)

=== Playoffs ===
Quarterfinals
3	Phoenix1	3
6	Team Dignitas	0
4	Counter Logic Gaming	2
5	FlyQuest	3

Semifinals
1	Team SoloMid	3
5	FlyQuest	0
2	Cloud9	3
3	Phoenix1	0

Final
1	Team SoloMid	3
2	Cloud9	2
Third place
3	Phoenix1	3
5	FlyQuest	2

Source: LoL Esports (Archived January 23, 2018, at the Wayback Machine)

=== Awards ===
- Most Valuable Player: Arrow, Phoenix1
- Rookie of the Split: Contractz, Cloud9
- Coach of the Split: Reapered, Cloud9
- 1st Team All-Pro:
  - T Hauntzer, Team SoloMid
  - J Lira, Team Envy
  - M Bjergsen, Team SoloMid
  - B Arrow, Phoenix1
  - S Smoothie, Cloud9
- 2nd Team All-Pro:
  - T Impact, Cloud9
  - J Dardoch, Immortals
  - M Jensen, Cloud9
  - B Sneaky, Cloud9
  - S Biofrost, Team SoloMid
- 3rd Team All-Pro:
  - T Ssumday, Dignitas
  - J Meteos, Phoenix1
  - M Ryu, Phoenix1
  - B Stixxay, Counter Logic Gaming
  - S Olleh, Immortals

== Summer ==
The Summer Split regular season ran from June 2 to August 6, 2017.

The bottom two teams from the regular season were relegated to the promotion tournament, where they competed with the top two teams from the Challenger Series. The tournament was held from August 11 to 13, 2017, and followed a double-elimination format. The top two teams advanced to the 2018 spring split.

The top six teams from the summer regular season secured spots in the Summer Split playoffs, which ran from August 19 to September 3, 2017. The playoffs were a single-elimination tournament, with top two teams starting in the semifinals and the following four starting in the quarterfinals. All matches were in a best-of-five format. The winner of the summer playoffs directly qualified for the 2017 World Championship. The Summer Split playoffs third place match and final were played at the TD Garden in Boston, Massachusetts.

=== Regular season ===
Pos	Team	Pld	W	L	PCT	Qualification or relegation
1	Team SoloMid	18	14	4	.778	Advance to semifinals
2	Immortals	18	14	4	.778	Advance to semifinals
3	Counter Logic Gaming	18	12	6	.667	Advance to quarterfinals
4	Cloud9	18	12	6	.667	Advance to quarterfinals
5	Dignitas	18	11	7	.611	Advance to quarterfinals
6	Team Envy	18	8	10	.444	Advance to quarterfinals
7	FlyQuest	18	6	12	.333	
8	Echo Fox	18	5	13	.278	
9	Team Liquid	18	4	14	.222	Promotion tournament
10	Phoenix1	18	4	14	.222	Promotion tournament

Source: LoL Esports (Archived February 3, 2018, at the Wayback Machine)
Rules for classification: 1) Winning percentage; 2) head-to-head record; 3) tiebreaker match(es)

=== Playoffs ===
Quarterfinals
3	Counter Logic Gaming	3
6	Team Envy	1
4	Cloud9	1
5	Team Dignitas	3

Semifinals
1	Team SoloMid	3
5	Team Dignitas	1
2	Immortals	3
3	Counter Logic Gaming	0

Final
1	Team SoloMid	3
2	Immortals	1
Third place
3	Team Dignitas	0
5	Counter Logic Gaming	3

Source: LoL Esports (Archived January 30, 2018, at the Wayback Machine)

=== Promotion tournament ===
Initial Round
A1	Team Liquid	3
B2	eUnited	0
A2	Phoenix1	3
B1	Gold Coin United	2
Losers Match
B1	Gold Coin United	0
B2	eUnited	3

First Qualification Match
Winner to 2018 Spring (Note: Team Liquid and Phoenix1 both won the promotion tournament, and would normally retain their spots in the NA LCS, however due to league-wide changes to a franchised model, they were no longer guaranteed a spot.)
A1	Team Liquid	3
A2	Phoenix1	2
Second Qualification Match
Winner to 2018 Spring
A2	Phoenix1	3
B2	eUnited	0

Source: LoL Esports (Archived January 23, 2018, at the Wayback Machine)

=== Awards ===
- Most Valuable Player: Bjergsen, Team SoloMid
- Rookie of the Split: MikeYeung, Phoenix1
- Coach of the Split: Ssong, Immortals
- 1st Team All-Pro:
  - T Ssumday, Dignitas
  - J Xmithie, Immortals
  - M Jensen, Cloud9
  - B Doublelift, Team SoloMid
  - S Olleh, Immortals
- 2nd Team All-Pro:
  - T Hauntzer, Team SoloMid
  - J Contractz, Cloud9
  - M Bjergsen, Team SoloMid
  - B Cody Sun, Immortals
  - S Smoothie, Cloud9
- 3rd Team All-Pro:
  - T Flame, Immortals
  - J Lira, Team Envy
  - M Huhi, Counter Logic Gaming
  - B Sneaky, Cloud9
  - S Aphromoo, Counter Logic Gaming

== Worlds qualification ==
=== Championship Points ===
Pos	Team	Spr	Sum	Total	Qualification
1	Team SoloMid	90	AQ	AQ	2017 League of Legends World Championship
2	Immortals	0	90	90	2017 League of Legends World Championship
3	Cloud9	70	20	90	Advance to regional qualifier
4	Counter Logic Gaming	10	70	80	Advance to regional qualifier
5	Dignitas	10	40	50	Advance to regional qualifier
6	FlyQuest	30	0	30	Advance to regional qualifier
7	Team Envy	0	20	20	
8	Phoenix1	50 (Note: Phoenix1 lost Spring Split points due to placing in a relegation position during the Summer Split)	0	0	
9	Echo Fox	0	0	0	
10	Team Liquid	0	0	0	

Source: 2017 NA LCS Rulebook
Rules for classification: 1) Championship points; 2) Summer Split points; 3) Summer Split regular season winning percentage; 4) Head-to-head record

=== Regional qualifier ===
Round 1
5	FlyQuest	3
6	Team Dignitas	0

Round 2
4	Counter Logic Gaming	3
5	FyQuest	1

Finals
3	Cloud9	3
4	Counter Logic Gaming	1

Source: LoL Esports (Archived January 14, 2018, at the Wayback Machine)

== Broadcast ==
- https://www.riftherald.com/competitive/2016/12/16/13728834/riot-lol-streaming-deal-bamtech-mlb
