= Sneaky (gamer) =

American streamer and former professional esports player

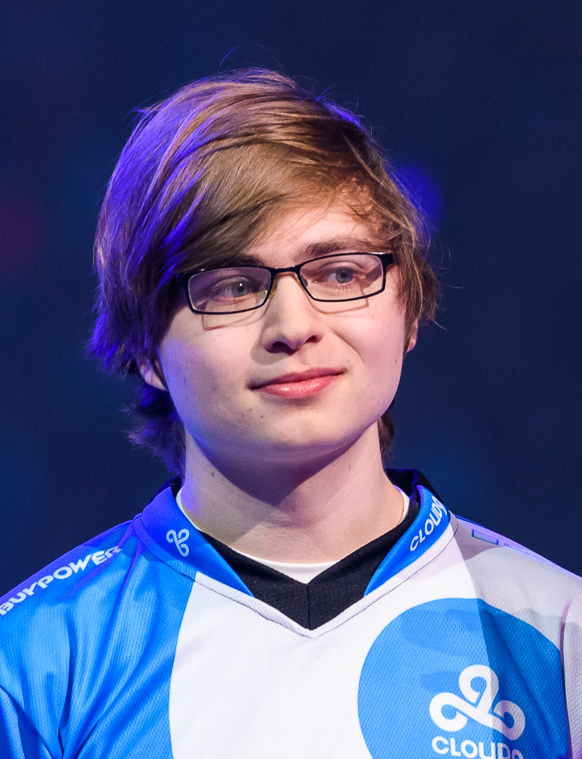
- Scuderi at the 2016 NA LCS Finals

Personal information
- Name: Zachary Scuderi
- Born: March 19, 1994 (age 32)
- Nationality: American

Career information
- Games: League of Legends
- Playing career: 2012–2020
- Role: ADC

Team history
- 2012: Ordinance Gaming
- 2012: Absolute Legends NA
- 2012–2013: Pulse Esports
- 2013: Team Dignitas
- 2013: Quantic Gaming
- 2013–2019: Cloud9

Career highlights and awards
- 2× NA LCS champion

Zachary Scuderi, better known as Sneaky, is a professional League of Legends player, streamer, crossplayer and pornographic actor. He played AD Carry for Cloud9 of the League of Legends Championship Series North America until 2019. He won the 2013 Summer NA LCS and 2014 Spring NA LCS with Cloud9. Scuderi is also known for his cosplays of anime and video game characters.

Sneaky became an independent full-time streamer on Twitch, leaving the professional scene in January 2020. However, despite not playing professionally, he has stated that he is not retired.

In November 2024, Scuderi set up an account on Fansly and began posting more content of a crossplaying and pornographic nature.

== Career ==
Originally a Mid Laner for Ordinance Gaming, he quickly transitioned into an AD Carry and bounced around on several NA teams, one of which included Team Dignitas.

=== Quantic Gaming ===
Sneaky joined Quantic Gaming on April 6, 2013, with the Balls, Meteos, Hai, and LemonNation.

=== Cloud9 ===
==== 2015 season ====
Cloud9 was the North American team fan-voted to IEM San Jose. They defeated paiN Gaming 2–0, Alliance 2–1, and then Unicorns of Love 3–0 to win the tournament. Sneaky capped off the finals against UOL with a game-winning pentakill on Corki.

Due to their IEM San Jose victory, Cloud9 qualified for IEM Katowice in March. They lost their only two games, first to GE Tigers and then to yoe Flash Wolves, and finished in 7th/8th place. Domestically, they underperformed at the start of the season and were in 8th place at the end of the second week of the spring LCS split. However, they improved over the course of the season, ending with a second-place finish behind Team SoloMid and a playoff bye; after beating Team Liquid 3–2, Cloud9 lost to TSM 1–3 in the finals and finished the split overall in second place.

Cloud9 replaced mid laner Hai with Incarnati0n at the start of the Summer Split due to Hai's retirement. They performed poorly for the first five weeks of the split and replaced Meteos with Hai going into the sixth week. With Hai back on the team, Cloud9's record improved from 3–7 to 6–12 by the end of the split, and they finished in 7th place after a tie-breaker victory against Team 8, narrowly avoiding relegations and retaining their Championship Points, though they did not qualify for playoffs. In the Regional Finals Gauntlet, Cloud9 reverse-swept both Gravity Gaming and Team Impulse before beating Team Liquid 3–1 in the finals. Their fourteen games played over the course of three days gave them North America's third seed to the 2015 Season World Championship, Cloud9's third-consecutive Worlds. Notably, Sneaky played Vayne in four games (3–1) and Draven twice (2–0), and had a 10.09 KDA across Cloud9's victories; he also received the MVP title for the final series of the gauntlet.

Considered an underdog at Worlds, Cloud9 were placed into Group B along with Fnatic, ahq, and Invictus Gaming and expected to place last. Instead, they surprised with an undefeated 3–0 first week. In the second week, Cloud9 needed only one win to advance to the quarterfinals but were unable to find it, losing four games in a row including a tiebreaker loss to ahq. They placed third in their group, ahead of only Invictus Gaming.

==== 2016 season ====
For the 2016 season, Cloud9 added two new players – Rush and Bunny FuFuu – and moved Hai to support, with the intention of splitting time with Bunny. However, after two losses with Bunny and two wins with Hai in the spring split, they committed to starting Hai full-time and rose to a 67% winrate, with a third-place seed in the playoffs. However, despite a seeding advantage, the team lost to TSM in the first round and were eliminated. Sneaky ended up losing the Worlds Quarterfinals with Cloud9 against Samsung Galaxy.

==== 2017 season ====
For the 2017 season, Cloud9 dropped Meteos and added Ray, the top laner from Apex Gaming, as well as Contractz, the jungler from Cloud9's Challenger Series team. Cloud9 proved strong with this roster, finishing in 2nd place with a 70% win rate during the regular split, the highest win rate out of any team. Following their spring success, Cloud9 had a reasonably strong summer split, finishing 4th place. Cloud9 ended up qualifying to the 2017 League of Legends World Championship through the NA Regional qualifier, taking a convincing 3–1 victory over Counter Logic Gaming. Their Worlds journey ended in the quarterfinals losing 2–3 against Team WE of the League of Legends Pro League.

==== 2018 season ====
Cloud9 entered the 2018 season replacing Contractz with former TSM jungler Svenskeren, and adding rookie top laner Licorice following Impact's move to Team Liquid. After a strong start to the split and vying for a playoff bye, Cloud9 faltered in the final weeks of the regular season and entered playoffs as the 5th seed after a series of tiebreakers. Cloud9 were defeated 3-0 by Team Liquid in the quarterfinals.

Just days before the start of the summer split, Cloud9 owner Jack Etienne and Coach Reapered shocked the League of Legends competitive community by announcing that Sneaky along with Jensen and Smoothie were being benched in favor of Cloud9 Academy players Keith, Goldenglue, and Zeyzal respectively, citing motivation issues and concern the starting roster would not qualify for playoffs. Cloud9 Academy dominated the academy league, however, the LCS roster struggled and fell to last place in the standings. Smoothie left the team, but Sneaky and Jensen were reinstated to the starting roster. Cloud9 found a winning formula utilizing a 7-man roster, and the team made an undefeated run in the second round robin to secure a 2nd-place finish and playoff bye in the summer playoffs. Cloud9 faced TSM in the semifinals and defeated their storied rivals 3–2, the first time Cloud9 had done so in the post-season since the 2014 spring finals. Cloud9 faced Team Liquid in the summer finals where they would once again be defeated by Liquid 3–0.

With their 2nd-place finish in the summer split, Cloud9 were seeded into the final round of the regional qualifier for the 2018 League of Legends World Championship where they once again faced TSM. Cloud9 defeated TSM in an impressive 3-0 set and qualified for Worlds as North America's 3rd seed. Cloud9 had to go through the Worlds play-in stage, going undefeated 4–0 in their group and defeating Gambit Esports 3–2 to qualify for the group stage. They were seeded into Group B (dubbed "the group of death") with Team Vitality, defending world champions GenG Esports, and tournament favorites Royal Never Give Up. After a rocky start, Cloud9 defied predictions and escaped the group of death going 3–0 in the second round robin. They faced RNG in a tiebreaker for 1st seed, losing after a close game and entered the knockout bracket as a 2nd seed.

Cloud9 faced Afreeca Freecs in the quarterfinals where they defeated the Korean team 3–0, becoming the first team from North America to reach top 4 at Worlds in seven years. Their semifinal match against Europe's Fnatic had even greater implications as it guaranteed the appearance of a western team in the World Finals for the first time since the inaugural tournament in 2011. Fnatic defeated Cloud9 3–0. For his part in Cloud9's miracle run from last place in North America to top 4 at Worlds, Sneaky was chosen by fan vote to attend the 2018 All-Star Event.

==== 2019 season ====
In the 2019 season, Nisqy joined as mid lane following Jensen's move to Team Liquid. Cloud9 had a strong spring split, finishing second in the regular season, but were defeated in a reverse sweep against TSM in the semi-finals. In summer Cloud9 had a strong split, but lost to Team Liquid in the finals in 5 games.

On January 15, 2020, Sneaky left the Cloud9 NA LCS Roster but remained an owner and advisor of the team.

== Post-hiatus ==
He is currently pursuing a career as a full-time Twitch streamer, though his teammates speculate he will likely make a return to professional play.

On July 10, 2020, Sneaky returned for a special LCS showmatch and the old Cloud9 team are reunited with Balls, Meteos, Hai, and LemonNation in order to face off TSM Classic consisting of Dyrus, TheOddOne, VoyBoy (replacing Reginald), WildTurtle, and Xpecial.

== Tournament results ==
- 1st - 2013 NA LCS Summer regular season
- 1st — 2013 NA LCS Summer playoffs
- 5–8th — 2013 League of Legends World Championship
- 1st - 2014 NA LCS Spring regular season
- 1st — 2014 NA LCS Spring playoffs
- 1st - 2014 NA LCS Summer regular season
- 2nd — 2014 NA LCS Summer playoffs
- 5–8th — 2014 League of Legends World Championship
- 2nd - 2015 NA LCS Spring regular season
- 2nd — 2015 NA LCS Spring playoffs
- 7th — 2015 NA LCS Summer regular season
- 1st — 2015 NA LCS Regional playoffs
- 9–11th — 2015 League of Legends World Championship
- 3rd — 2016 NA LCS Spring regular season
- 5/6th — 2016 NA LCS Spring playoffs
- 3rd — 2016 NA LCS Summer regular season
- 2nd — 2016 NA LCS Summer playoffs
- 5–8th — 2016 League of Legends World Championship
- 2nd — 2017 NA LCS Spring regular season
- 2nd — 2017 NA LCS Spring playoffs
- 4th — 2017 NA LCS Summer regular season
- 5/6th — 2017 NA LCS Summer playoffs
- 5–8th — 2017 League of Legends World Championship
- 5th — 2018 NA LCS Spring regular season
- 5/6th — 2018 NA LCS Spring playoffs
- 2nd — 2018 NA LCS Summer regular season
- 2nd — 2018 NA LCS Summer playoffs
- 1st — 2018 NA Regional Finals
- 3/4th — 2018 League of Legends World Championship
