= PowerOfEvil =

German League of Legends player

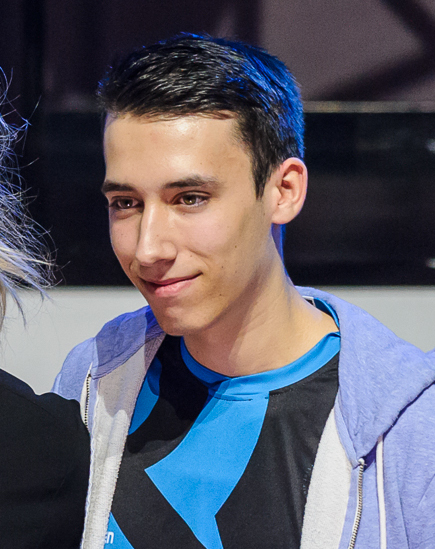
- Schrage in 2015

Personal information
- Name: Tristan Schrage
- Nationality: German

Current team
- Team: Eintracht Spandau
- Role: Midlaner
- Game: League of Legends
- Leagues: Prime League

Team history
- 2014–2015: Unicorns of Love
- 2016: Origen
- 2017: Misfits
- 2018: Optic Gaming
- 2019: Counter Logic Gaming
- 2020: FlyQuest
- 2021: Team SoloMid
- 2022: Immortals
- 2024–present: Eintracht Spandau

Tristan Schrage, better known as PowerOfEvil, also shortened to POE, is a German professional League of Legends player. Schrage has played for a number of professional teams in both in Europe and North America, including Unicorns of Love, Origen, Misfits, Optic Gaming, Counter Logic Gaming, FlyQuest, Team SoloMid, and Immortals.

== Professional career ==
=== Unicorns of Love ===
Schrage started his career on Unicorns of Love in 2014, replacing the incumbent Xodiaz partway through the year. Unicorns of love did not achieve great success in 2014, but the following year, the team made it all the way to the title match, eventually falling to Fnatic in the finals to place second overall. In the summer, they placed fourth overall, but did not qualify for the 2015 World Championship. Following the 2015 season, it was announced that Schrage would be leaving Unicorns of Love.

=== Origen ===
Schrage joined Origen for the 2016 season, and split time with xPeke in the mid lane throughout the season. Schrage reached the spring finals once again in the EU LCS, this time falling to G2 Esports and finishing in second once again. However, in the Spring Season, the team struggled, finishing in ninth place out of ten teams, missing both the playoffs, as well as the World Championship.

=== Misfits ===
Schrage joined Misfits in 2017. In the Spring Season, Misfits placed fourth overall, and in summer, Schrage achieved his third finals loss in three years, after Misfits were defeated by G2. However, despite not winning a split, Misfits still qualified for Worlds as Europe's second seed, due to their accumulated number of championship points. At the World championship, Misfits advanced past the groupstage, and met SK Telecom T1, the tournament favorites in the quarterfinals. Despite being heavy underdogs, Misfits took SKT to all the way to five games, in a very competitive series before falling.

=== OpTic Gaming ===
In 2018, Schrage moved from Europe to North America to join OpTic Gaming in the NA LCS. The team finished in ninth and seventh in their two splits that year, failing to even qualify for playoffs, and Schrage left the team after the season finished.

=== Counter Logic Gaming ===
Schrage joined Counter Logic Gaming in 2019. Once again he struggled along with his team, missing the playoffs with a seventh-place finish in spring. In summer however, the team made strides, and finished third in the regular season, and third in playoffs, allowing them once last chance in the regional gauntlet to qualify for Worlds. However the team was defeated 3–2 by Clutch Gaming and Schrage once again did not attend the World Championship.

=== FlyQuest ===
In 2020, Schrage moved teams once again, this time to FlyQuest. In the spring split, Schrage made it to his fourth domestic finals appearance, and the first since 2017, however once there, FlyQuest was swept 3–0 by Cloud9, and the team finished in second. In summer, Schrage took another second flash finish, this time losing the finals to Team SoloMid, however they still qualified for the 2020 World Championship. At Worlds, FlyQuest was eliminated in the group stage, after finishing third in their group with a 3–3 record.

=== Team SoloMid ===
For the 2021 season, Schrage was signed by Team SoloMid, replacing their long time star, Bjergsen. Schrage and TSM achieved regular season success, finishing second in spring, and first in summer, but both times fell in the playoffs, with a third and fourth-place finish, respectively, missing out on Worlds qualification.

=== Immortals ===
Schrage joined Immortals in 2022, making the team his eighth in as many years.
