= Doublelift =

American professional esports player and streamer (born 1993)

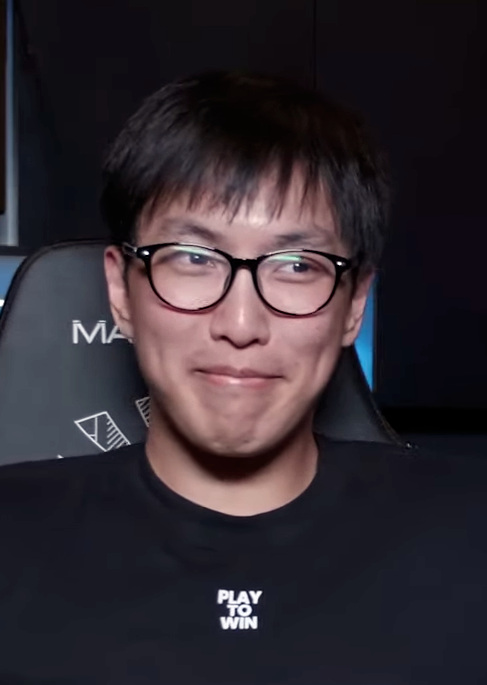
- Doublelift in 2019

Personal information
- Name: Yiliang Peng
- Nickname: Peter
- Born: July 19, 1993 (age 33)
- Nationality: American

Career information
- Games: League of Legends
- Playing career: 2011–2020, 2022–2023, 2025–present

Team history
- 2011: Counter Logic Gaming
- 2011: Epik Gamer
- 2011: unRestricted eSports
- 2011: Team Curse
- 2011–2014: Counter Logic Gaming (Note: Known as CLG Prime from May to December 2012.)
- 2015–2017: Team SoloMid
- 2018–2020: Team Liquid
- 2020: Team SoloMid
- 2023: 100 Thieves
- 2025: Near Airport

Career highlights and awards
- 8× LCS Champion; NA LCS MVP (2018 Summer); 5× LCS All–Pro First Team; Rift Rivals champion (2017)

Chinese name
- Chinese: 彭亦亮
Transcriptions
Standard Mandarin
- Hanyu Pinyin: Péng Yìliàng

Yiliang "Peter" Peng (born July 19, 1993), also known as his pseudonym Doublelift, is an American content creator, streamer, semi-professional and former-professional League of Legends player. He previously played for Counter Logic Gaming (CLG), Team Liquid, Team SoloMid (TSM), and 100 Thieves, and currently plays for his own personal team, Near Airport. Doublelift is widely considered to be one of the greatest North American League of Legends Championship Series players of all time, with 1 Split MVP, 5 All-Pro First Teams, and 1 All-Pro Third Team in 18 splits of competitive play. He is known for being a fierce competitor and trash-talking his opponents. One of his most famous statements came in 2013 at the League of Legends All-Star tournament when he claimed that, "Everyone else is trash."

== Career ==
Doublelift comes from California, and started playing console games before jumping to PC titles such as DotA, World of Warcraft, and Heroes of Newerth, eventually moving to League of Legends. In an interview with Machinima in 2013, Doublelift said his relationship with his parents was strained, because of his dream of being a professional esports player. "I would always struggle with my parents... we would just argue over everything, especially games. When I wanted to play they thought it was just a complete waste of time. It got worse and worse over the years." Doublelift first entered professional League of Legends when he gained the attention of George "HotshotGG" Georgallidis, founder of CLG, who recruited him as a substitute Support player. Shortly after, Doublelift left CLG to become the starting Support for Epik Gamer. He later joined UnRestricted as the starting AD Carry, and the team was acquired by Team Curse later that year.

Doublelift's first major tournament was DreamHack Summer 2011, also known as the Riot Season 1 Championship. Hosted in Sweden, he needed his parents' permission to go, but at the time his beginning esports career was a secret to his parents. "They wouldn't let me go... They were like 'You're going to die if you go to Sweden for Dreamhack'. " He was ultimately allowed to go after Doublelift's older brother helped convince their parents.

Doublelift was timid and socially awkward around his teammates. "I was really awkward and really introverted at the time. I was just that typical Asian guy who does nothing but play games. When I finally met my team I was like 'hi' and that was like the only thing I said. I said nothing after that. I was just a presence with them but I didn't interact with them very much." In a Reddit AMA (Ask me anything), Doublelift said he owed it to Epik Gamer for giving him the opportunity to begin his career. "Without Epik Gamer, I would have never made it into the pro scene most likely."

When Doublelift returned home, he said his parents were not proud of his accomplishment at Dreamhack. "They wanted me to go to college." Tensions grew between him and his parents over his choice of career, until in 2011 his parents told him to leave the house. He did, taking his prize money from Dreamhack and his computer. Doublelift wrote about the event on Reddit in a thread titled "Hi I'm Doublelift, formerly of team [Epik Gamer], and today I became homeless." With no college degree or family to return to, he decided to go all-in on his professional gaming career. Doublelift began earning money for writing educational League of Legends content for Team Curse. "I pretty much made half the guides for that site... I was just super happy and I could finally pay rent that month."

=== Counter Logic Gaming (2012–2015) ===
CLG prime would attend the 2012 MLG Fall Championship in Dallas on November 2 through 4th. In the first round they faced the Korean powerhouse NaJin Sword, where they were routed in two lopsided matches. Falling to the losers bracket, CLG Prime would sweep Curse Gaming in round one, and then pick up a close 2–1 series against another NA team Dignitas. They faced their sister team CLG EU in Round 3 and lost 2–1 and were eliminated from the tournament. CLG Prime finished in 4th with $2,500 in winnings.

On February 27, 2013, CLG participated in the Riot Season 3 North American League Championship Series Spring Split.

In 2014, Doublelift and CLG finished third and fifth, respectively in the spring and summer playoffs, and did not qualify for international events.

CLG and Doublelift were fined on January 6, 2015, after being found guilty of poaching ZionSpartan. CLG was fined $2,000 while Doublelift was fined $2,500. Furthermore, CLG was restricted from fielding ZionSpartan as a player or coach for the first week of the 2015 LCS Spring Split.

For the first eight weeks of the spring split, CLG was never lower in the standings than tied for second place. In the end, they lost a second-place tiebreaker to Cloud9 and so ended up in third place in the regular season. Ultimately, CLG lost to Team Liquid in the quarterfinals and ended the split tied for fifth place with Gravity Gaming.

Doublelift was benched during the Summer LCS due to an injury incurred from playing basketball.

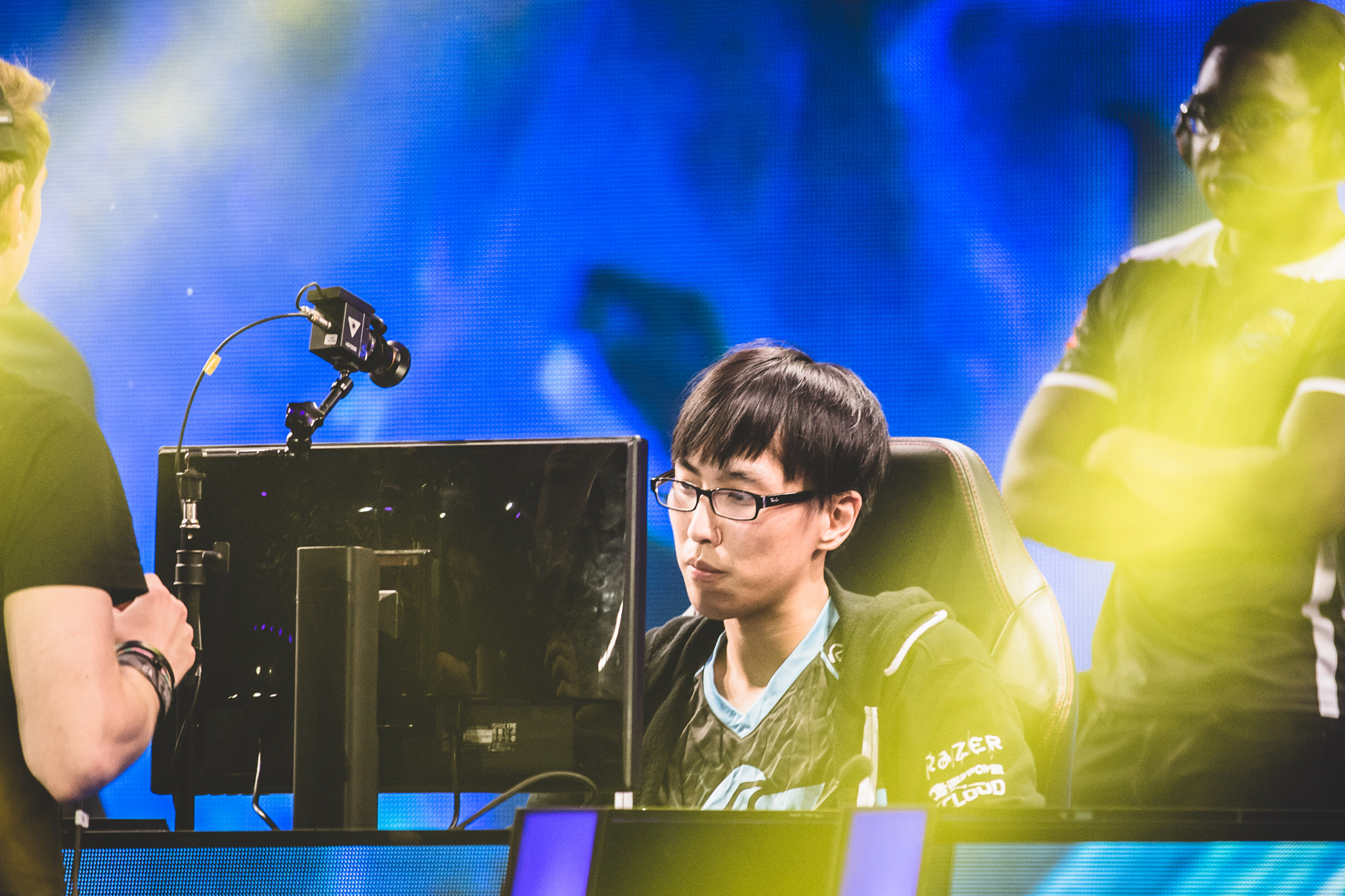
Doublelift at the 2015 League of Legends World Championship

In August, Doublelift helped CLG win their first-ever LCS Split playoff title. The victory also qualified them for the 2015 League of Legends World Championship. At Worlds CLG failed to make the bracket and finished 12/13th. On October 31, CLG informed Doublelift that they were not going to re-sign him.

=== Team SoloMid (2016) ===
After CLG released a statement, Team SoloMid announced that Doublelift would be joining, replacing long tenured AD Carry WildTurtle. On his new team, Doublelift reached the finals of the spring split, and faced off against his old team CLG. TSM fell 3–2 to CLG, and took a second-place finish, missing out on the Mid-Season Invitational. In summer, Team SoloMid added a new support to pair with Doublelift in the botlane, picking up Vincent "Biofrost" Wang. The team saw significant improvement in the summer split, improving their previous 9–9 record to a 17–1 standing at the end of the regular season, and earned a bye into playoffs. Doublelift also earned First Team All-Pro honors for his performance. Doublelift once again made it to the finals, and this time won, defeating Cloud9 3–1, to give Doublelift his second title.

Before the start of the 2017 season, TSM announced that Doublelift would be taking a hiatus from professional League of Legends during the spring split, saying "it's time for a small break." While he would remain contracted to the team, he would be streaming full-time until his return to professional play in the summer when, according to TSM owner Andy Dinh, he would have to compete with his replacement to return to the starting roster. In the past, Doublelift has spoken out about the never-ending competitive schedule for professional League of Legends. After representing North America in the All-Star 2013 in Shanghai, Doublelift said in a Reddit AMA "I'm just tired of playing all day every day, and I want a goddamn break but it's not possible to get one." In a Reddit AMA in 2014, Doublelift said "Most people who look at pros think that we live the dream life when in reality you either practice 16 hours a day or lose and end up frustrated. Sometimes you practice 16 hours a day and still end up losing." One month later, TSM announced that WildTurtle would be Doublelift's replacement for the 2017 spring split. In an interview, teammate Bjergsen agreed with Dinh's initial announcement that Doublelift would need to compete with his replacement, saying "I want WildTurtle to succeed and I wasn't just sitting around waiting for Peter because I wanted someone who was committed, and like I said I was disappointed and I felt he wasn't very committed. I didn't feel like he should just have the luxury of going out and making a lot of money [streaming] and returning to the team... No matter how good of a friend they are to me, if someone decides he's just going to take six months off and he thinks he's can just reenter the team, that's just not okay with me because I think everyone has to earn their spot."

=== Team Liquid and brief return to TSM (2017–2020) ===
More than halfway through the spring season and threatened by relegation, Team Liquid announced that Doublelift would temporarily be joining the team and would be released back to TSM at the end of the spring split, sparking controversy due to concerns of a conflict of interest when Doublelift inevitably competed against Team SoloMid while signed to Team Liquid. Team Liquid owner Steve Arhancet responded that Riot Games approved the trade after the team demonstrated that no other player in that role would be suitable for the team.

Before the start of the 2018 NA LCS season, TSM announced they would be parting ways with Doublelift, citing a desire for a stronger shot-caller in the bottom lane. On the same day, Team Liquid announced Doublelift would be returning along with his ex-Counter Logic Gaming teammates Xmithie and Pobelter. The team finished 4th place in the Spring Split regular season, securing a spot in the playoffs with a 12–8 record behind his former team TSM. Team Liquid defeated Cloud9 3–0 in the quarterfinals and Echo Fox 3–1 in the semifinals to make it to the Team Liquid's first ever final.

A week before the final, Doublelift learned that his mother Wei Ping Shen was killed and his father Guojon Peng seriously injured after his older brother Yihong Peng allegedly stabbed them in their family home in San Juan Capistrano California. Doublelift posted on Twitlonger "I'm still processing this news and joining up with my dad and little brother to make sure they're ok and the proper arrangements are being made. I'll likely be quiet on social media while I work through this. I hope you all understand and support me as you always have in the past." In an interview with Machinima in 2013, Doublelift had said his older brother was the biggest influence on his life and career, and that he had regrets over his falling out with his parents and wished to make amends in the future, but with his busy career "right now I can't do that, I'm too busy." Despite the pressure faced during this event, Steve Arhancet, owner and co-CEO of Team Liquid, announced that Doublelift would not be taking time off and was determined to play in the final as planned. In the final, Team Liquid convincingly defeated 100 Thieves 3–0 and won its first league championship.

In the summer split of 2018, Doublelift and Team Liquid picked up where they left off in spring. A tightly contested regular season saw Team Liquid come out with the number one seed by only a single game over Cloud9, qualifying them for a bye in the first round and a guaranteed spot in the semi-finals. Matched up against 100 Thieves, Doublelift and Team liquid cruised to a 3–1 series victory to move on to a spot in the finals against Cloud9. On the eve of the NA LCS finals, Doublelift was awarded a long-awaited NA LCS MVP for the summer split. This was his first MVP award. Team Liquid easily defeated Cloud9 3–0 in the finals to capture back to back North American LCS titles and looked towards a strong showing at Worlds 2018. However, they were eliminated in the group stage by KT Rolster and Edward Gaming.

After their group stage exit at Worlds 2018, Team Liquid announced the signings of Jensen and former world champion CoreJJ to the mid lane and support positions respectively. With their newly revamped roster, Team Liquid finished 14–4 on the 2019 Spring Split advancing to the Spring finals to face Doublelift's former team TSM. Team Liquid dropped the first two games of the series, but won the final three games to reverse sweep TSM in the best of 5 series, thus earning Doublelift his 6th championship and 3rd straight title.

Despite coming off of a strong performance in the Spring playoffs, Team Liquid struggled initially in the group stage of MSI (Mid-Season Invitational) 2019, but with a strong finish to the group stage they secured the final spot in the knock–out stage. In the semifinals, the 4th seeded Team Liquid upset the defending world champions, Invictus Gaming, 3–1, and advanced to the finals, where they faced G2 Esports, and were ultimately defeated in a 3–0 sweep.

After MSI, Liquid started out the 2019 LCS Summer Split 2–2, tying them for 4th place. However, by the end of the split, they had once again accrued a 14–4 record, finishing first. In the summer playoffs, Team Liquid beat Clutch Gaming 3–2, and secured a spot at the 2019 League of Legends World Championship. They advanced to the summer finals where they met the second seeded Cloud9. TL won the first game of the series, then dropped games 2 and 3, before winning the final two games to secure their 4th straight LCS trophy. This was Doublelift his 7th championship overall, and passing Xmithie to become the player with the most Championship titles in LCS history. At Worlds, Team Liquid were drawn into Group D, alongside DAMWON Gaming, Invictus Gaming, and ahq e-Sports Club. They went 3–3, placing third in their group, and were eliminated from the tournament.

With their premature exit from Worlds, Team Liquid parted ways with their jungler, Xmithie, and signed former Fnatic Jungler, Broxah. Prior to the start of the spring 2020 split, Broxah had visa issues preventing him from joining them for the start of the spring season, and Team Liquid performed very poorly. Midway through the split, Doublelift was benched in favor of Team Liquid Academy ADC (Attack Damage Carry) Tactical. According to Doublelift, this decision stemmed from his apparent lack of motivation to begin the 2020 spring split. Doublelift publicly apologized to his teammates for his attitude, and promised to work harder to return to the LCS stage. Doublelift returned to the starting lineup the following week, but ultimately Liquid finished the split in 9th place and did not make 2020 Spring Playoffs. Doublelift and Team Liquid's failure to qualify for playoffs marked the first time in LCS history that the reigning champion failed to qualify for the following split's playoffs.

=== Return to TSM (2020) ===
With a disappointing finish to Spring 2020, Team Liquid traded Doublelift to TSM for the 2020 Summer Split.

With his new team, Doublelift and TSM had a shaky start to the first half of the split, with a record of 6–3. Although they were third in LCS, critics deemed their wins unconvincing and some considered their record as not properly reflective of their actual skill level. In the middle of the split, Biofrost was replaced by TSM Academy support Treatz, with the team citing better communication and playmaking as the deciding factors. TSM finished the regular split in 4th place with a 12–6 record and qualified for playoffs. In playoffs, TSM faced the fifth-seeded Golden Guardians in the upper bracket of the double-elimination tournament. Although it was projected to be a close series, Golden Guardians unexpectedly swept TSM 3–0 with the TSM bottom lane being perceived as the weak link in the loss. After the first-round defeat, the team subbed Biofrost back in place of Treatz. The move was in part cited to the existing synergy between Doublelift and Biofrost, especially for laning phase. TSM would drop to the bottom half of the elimination bracket to face the 8th seed, Team Dignitas. TSM swept Dignitas in a convincing fashion, as expected. With the Golden Guardians' loss to Team Liquid, TSM had to face them once again in the 2nd round of the lower bracket. Golden Guardians took the first two games of the series, but behind outstanding performances from Bjergsen, Spica, and Brokenblade, TSM managed to come back and reverse sweep the series. In the next round, TSM faced Cloud9 in order to determine the final seed for the 2020 World Championships. TSM won the series against Cloud9 3–1 and qualified for Worlds. With Team Liquid losing to FlyQuest in the upper bracket, Doublelift faced his old team in order to move on to the summer split finals. TSM defeated Team Liquid 3–2 after a grueling five-game series. TSM faced FlyQuest in the finals, with TSM once again winning 3–2 after a tough five-game series. This win marked Doublelift's 8th NA LCS title.

Completing their miraculous lower bracket run, Doublelift and TSM headed to Shanghai for the 2020 World Championships as the NA 1st seed. During the tournament, TSM was placed into Group C along with the LCK 3rd seed Gen.G, the LEC 2nd seed FNC, and the LPL 4th seed LGD. Doublelift was once again unable to advance past the group stage, after TSM went 0–6 in the group stage.

In November 2020, Doublelift announced on his Twitter account that he was retiring from professional League of Legends, thus concluding a storied career which spanned nearly a decade.

On March 11, 2021, TSM announced on their Twitter that Doublelift was returning to the organization as a full-time content creator and streamer. Several months after his retirement, Doublelift revealed a significant reason he walked away from the pro scene was due to discontent with Team SoloMid, even going so far as to say "I fucking hate TSM" as well as accusing the owner, Reginald, of abuse, and left the organization entirely in November.

=== 100 Thieves (2023) ===
In December 2022, Doublelift announced his return to professional play, signing a contract with 100 Thieves for the 2023 season. In December 2023, Doublelift announced that he would be retiring for a second time.

=== Near Airport (2025) ===
In January 2025, Doublelift announced that he would return to competitive League of Legends, this time under his own team later known as "Near Airport" (a reference to North America's history of lackluster performances in international competitions), for the North American Challengers League qualifiers. The team proceeded to qualify for Split 1 of NACL without dropping a game. Near Airport has been compared to Los Ratones, a team founded by British streamer and former player Caedrel, for their practice of live-streaming scrimmages as well as their own games. In June 2025, the team disbanded.

== Personal life ==
Doublelift was born on July 19, 1993, and grew up in Mission Viejo, California. He has a younger and an older brother. In April 2018, his older brother killed their mother and injured their father after an altercation outside of their family's home.

Doublelift is close friends with esports journalist Travis Gafford. In an interview with Team Dignitas, Gafford said they first met when Doublelift posted on Reddit that he was homeless and Gafford offered for him to live on his couch until he had money to pay rent. Doublelift said "Travis really helped me grow up as a person because when I'm playing games and focusing on my job you don't have basic social skills or an understanding of the world. When I go outside I'm like 'how much money am I supposed to spend on food? How do I do my taxes? How do I get a bank account?' I didn't have a credit card, all I had was my wallet with cash and a PayPal account. He helped me set up a bank account, he helped me set up my life."

In April 2018, after Doublelift's mother was killed and his father was injured, Doublelift's older brother Yihong Peng was arrested by Orange County Sherrif's Department for allegedly stabbing their mother to death and severely injuring their father. Yihong was charged by Orange County with murder and attempted murder. In November 2024, he was found not guilty by reason of insanity due to schizophrenia.

== Seasons overview ==
Team	Year	Domestic			Mid-Season Invitational	World Championship
Team	Year	League	Spring	Summer	Mid-Season Invitational	World Championship
Epik Gamer	2011	—N/a			—N/a	4th
Counter Logic Gaming	2012	Champions	5th–8th	5th–8th	—N/a	9th–10th
Counter Logic Gaming	2013	NA LCS	5th–6th	5th	—N/a	Did not qualify
Counter Logic Gaming	2014	NA LCS	3rd	5th	—N/a	Did not qualify
Counter Logic Gaming	2015	NA LCS	5th–6th	1st	Did not qualify	12th–13th
Team SoloMid	2016	NA LCS	2nd	1st	Did not qualify	9th–12th
Team Liquid	2017	NA LCS	9th	—N/a	Did not qualify	—N/a
Team SoloMid	2017	NA LCS	—N/a	1st	—N/a	9th–11th
Team Liquid	2018	NA LCS	1st	1st	5th	9th–12th
Team Liquid	2019	LCS	1st	1st	2nd	9th–12th
Team Liquid	2020	LCS	9th	—N/a	Did not qualify	—N/a
Team SoloMid	2020	LCS	—N/a	1st	—N/a	13th–16th
100 Thieves	2023	LCS	5th–6th	7th–8th	Did not qualify	Did not qualify
Near Airport	2025	NACL	4th	—N/a	Did not qualify	Did not qualify

== Awards and nominations ==
Year	Ceremony	Category	Result	Ref.
2021	The Streamer Awards	Best League of Legends Streamer	Nominated	
2025	The Streamer Awards	Legacy Award	Won	
