= TSM League of Legends division =

League of Legends esports team

- Game: League of Legends
- Founded: 2011
- League: LCS (2013–2023)
- Based in: Los Angeles, California
- Owner: Andy "Reginald" Dinh
- LCS titles: 7; Spring 2013; Summer 2014; Spring 2015; Summer 2016; Spring 2017; Summer 2017; Summer 2020
- Website: tsm.gg

The League of Legends division of TSM was a gaming team based in Los Angeles, California, that competed in the League Championship Series (LCS), the top-level professional league for video game League of Legends in the United States and Canada, from 2013 to 2023. The organization sold their LCS franchise slot in 2023.

Established in 2011, the League of Legends division was the founding division of Team SoloMid. The team formed from a group of players that represented the community of the online League of Legends blog SoloMid.net, which was founded by brothers Dan Dinh and Andy "Reginald" Dinh. TSM was one of the founding members of the LCS and won the inaugural NA LCS championship. They won five more LCS titles from 2014 to 2017, including three consecutive titles: Summer 2016, Spring 2017, and Summer 2017. Their seventh LCS title came in Summer 2020.

Internationally, TSM has taken part in a total two Mid-Season Invitationals and eight League of Legends World Championships. Their world championship appearances span from the inaugural event in 2011 through 2017, as well as in 2020. They also won the Intel Extreme Masters Season IX World Championship in 2015.

== History ==
=== 2011–2013: Early years ===
==== 2011–2012: Pre-LCS era ====
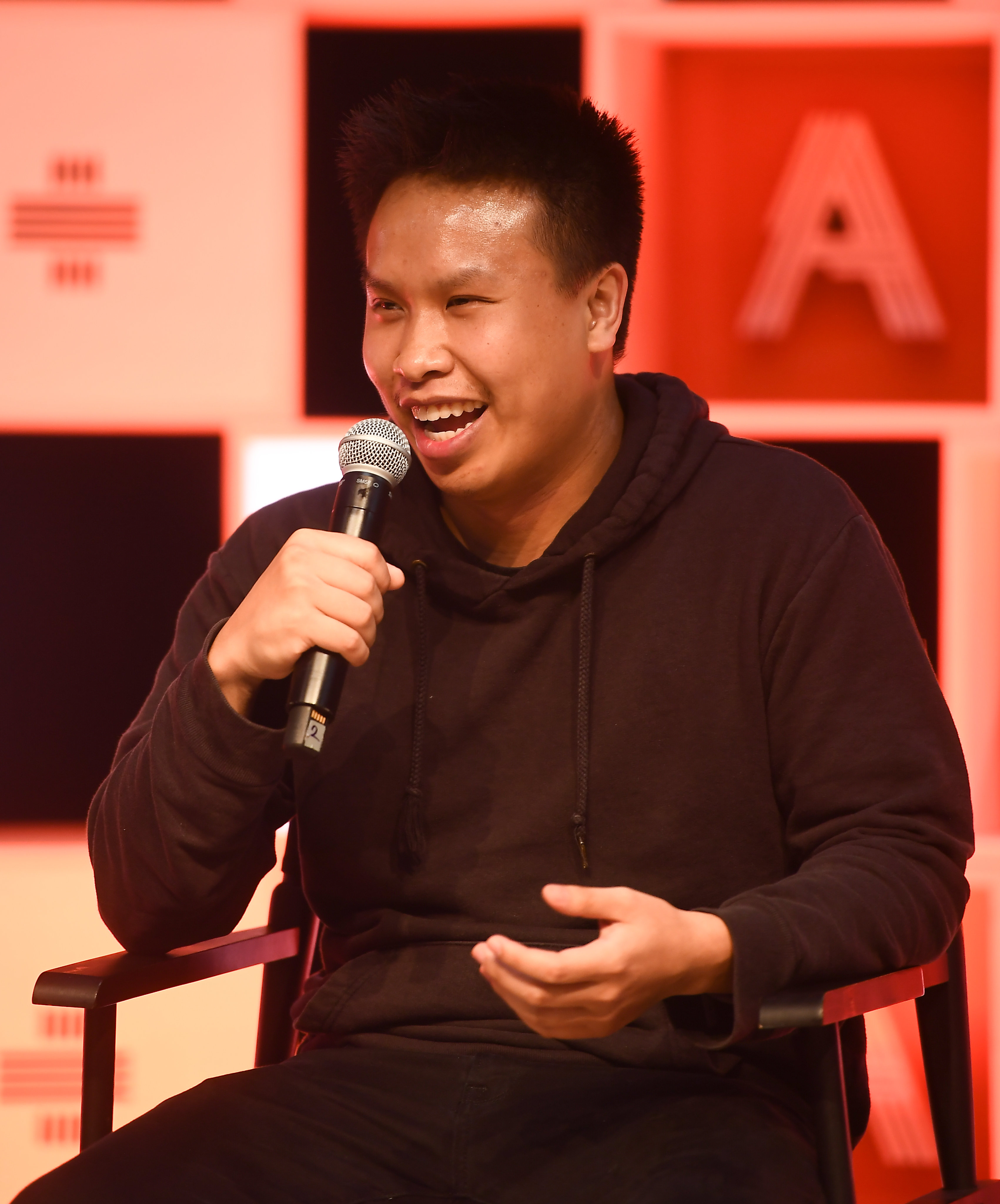
Founder Andy "Reginald" Dinh

Before entering esports, the origin of Team SoloMid (TSM) traces back to September 2009, when Andy "Reginald" Dinh and his brother Dan Dinh created a blog, which became SoloMid.net, during their college years providing written guides for the game League of Legends. The Dinh brothers were both part of a League of Legends clan called All or Nothing during the game's beta testing, which later rebranded to SoloMid. A small group of players that represented the SoloMid.net community would become the original TSM team: Brandon "Saintvicious" DiMarco, Shan "Chaox" Huang, Brian "TheOddOne" Wyllie, Choi "Locodoco" Yoon-seop, and Reginald. Team SoloMid was officially created in January 2011. Later that year, Riot Games launched the first season of what would become the League Championship Series. By then, both SaintVicious and Locodoco had left the team, and Christian "TheRainMan" Kahmann and Alex "Xpecial" Chu had replaced them to complete TSM's roster of the first season. The same year, Jack Etienne had become the general manager for the team.

In June 2011, Team SoloMid participated in the Season One World Championship. Following a successful performance in the group stage, they faced a setback in the upper bracket semifinals, when they were defeated by Against All Authority (aAa) by a score of 1–2. This loss dropped them to the lower bracket semifinal, where TSM secured a 2–0 victory against Epik Gaming. In the lower bracket final, Team SoloMid once again crossed paths with aAa, who had previously defeated them in the upper bracket final. In this rematch, aAa was given a one-game advantage due to their prior victory. TSM lost the first match of the best-of-three series, ultimately securing a 3rd place finish in the tournament and a prize of US$15,000. In August, TSM participated in two competitions at Gamescom. They took part in the Global Challenge Cologne, the first live event of Intel Extreme Masters Season VI, as well as ESL Major Series VIII. TSM secured the second-place position in both events, with Counter Logic Gaming (CLG) and SK Gaming winning in the respective finals. Towards the end of October 2011, Team SoloMid moved into a gaming house located in Lindenhurst, New York, making them the first North American team to do so. Subsequently, in the following month, the team won their first LAN event at the 2011 MLG Providence League of Legends tournament.

In January 2012, TSM participated in the IEM Season VI Global Challenge Kyiv. During the group stage, they secured victories against Curse Gaming, SK Gaming, and White Lotus, advancing them to the playoffs. In the semifinals, TSM emerged victorious against Dignitas, securing their spot in the finals. In the championship match, they were pitted against Moscow Five, a team that had maintained an undefeated record throughout the tournament. Team SoloMid fell short in the finals, losing to Moscow Five by a score of 1–2, placing second in the event. Following a disappointing performance at the 2012 IEM World Championship in Hanover, TSM announced that TheRainMan was departing from the team due to internal issues. The team subsequently added Marcus "Dyrus" Hill to their roster on March 12.

After the roster change, TSM finished as the highest placing among North American team through their next eight offline events. In April, they won the IGN Pro League (IPL) 4, beating other top North American teams including Counter Logic Gaming's North America team (CLG.NA), Dignitas, and Curse Gaming. In June, TSM won all three offline tournaments they participated in. The first was the Reign of Gaming International Invitational, although it was the least competitive of these events, as it did not feature other top-level North American teams. Following, they won the MLG Spring Championship, defeating CLG.NA in the finals. Lastly, at the GIGABYTE Esports LAN, although the tournament was not a regular fixture on the circuit, TSM once again emerged victorious, defeating CLG.NA in finals again. In August, at the MLG Summer Arena, TSM defeated Curse Gaming by a score of 3–0 and only lost to Azubu Blaze, who ultimately claimed the title and were widely regarded as the world's top team at that time. A week later, TSM won the IPL Face Off: San Francisco Showdown, where they defeated Curse in the final match. At the end of the month, the team competed in the Season Two Regional qualifier, a qualifier event for the Season Two World Championship. TSM defeated both Curse Gaming and Dignitas, earning the top North American seed.

At the Season Two World Championship, TSM's number one North American seed advanced them directly to the quarterfinals. The tournament featured five major regions, and not all could be seeded directly into the quarterfinal. In a random draw conducted by Riot, Azubu Frost, the top seed from Korea, was selected to enter the event in the group stage. Azubu Frost advanced to the quarterfinals, setting up a quarterfinal match between them and TSM. TSM lost the match to Azubu Frost and were eliminated from the event. Despite their loss, they were the only North American team to play beyond the group stage of the event.

In the final two events of the year, the MLG Fall Championship and IPL5, Team SoloMid did not finish either event as the top-ranked North American team, although none of their losses came from North American teams. At MLG, they finished one round behind CLG.NA, only losing to Korea's NJ SWD and Europe's CLG.EU. At IPL5, TSM lost to Europe teams Curse.EU and CLG.EU and Korean team Azubu Blaze.

==== 2013: Inaugural LCS champions ====
The first North American League of Legends Championship Series (NA LCS) season occurred in 2013. With it, a shift in atmosphere and practice regimens proved to be a challenging adjustment for Chaox. By the midpoint of the season, in February 2013, the team signed Jason "WildTurtle" Tran as a substitute. Following a match in which WildTurtle achieved a pentakill, he assumed the starting position for TSM, and the team finished the spring split regular season in first place. As the playoffs arrived, the newly configured TSM, with WildTurtle in the lineup, navigated through the semifinals to face the finalist, the sixth-seeded Good Game University (GGU). In the championship match, GGU pushed TSM to a full five-game series before eventually losing, securing TSM's place as the inaugural NA LCS league champion. In the 2013 summer split, TSM was struggling to maintain a .500 record in the regular season and finished in third place in the regular season. In the playoffs, TSM secured a spot in the final, defeating Vulcun in the NA LCS semifinal for the second consecutive time. However, the championship match was a one-sided affair, as Cloud9, a team that had only dropped three maps throughout the entire season, outclassed TSM in every aspect of the game and claimed the title from the defending champions.

At the Season 3 World Championship in October 2013, TSM found themselves placed in a group stage alongside GamingGear.eu from the Commonwealth of Independent States (CIS), Lemondogs from Europe, SK Telecom T1 from South Korea, and Oh My God from China. TSM did not progress beyond the group stage, failing to advance to the playoffs.

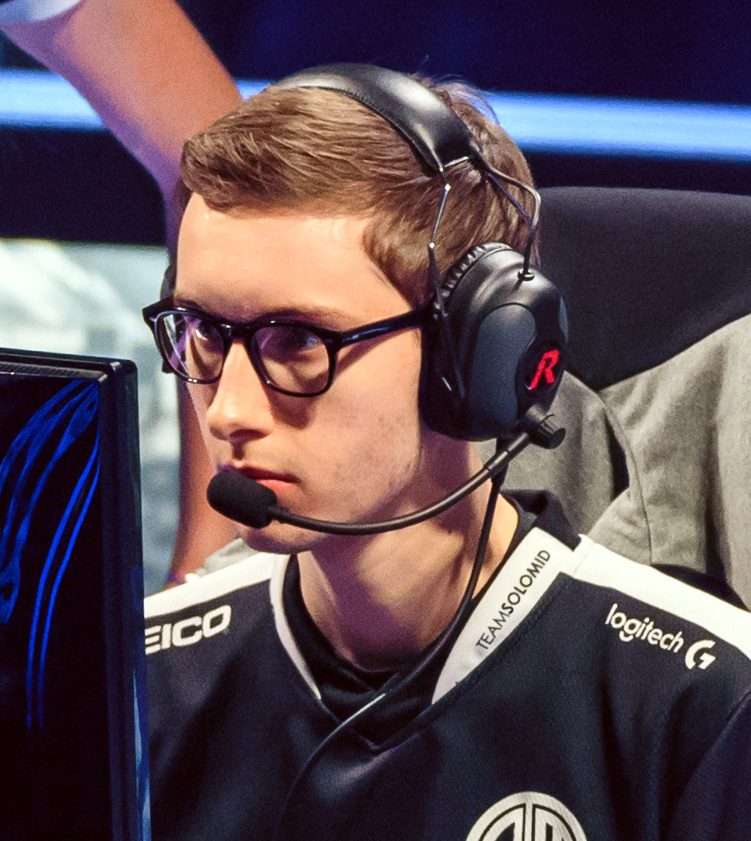
Bjergsen joined the team in late 2013

Following the world championship, TSM signed Søren "Bjergsen" Bjerg, a Danish teenager who previously played for the Copenhagen Wolves. In December, Team SoloMid then competed in the Battle of the Atlantic, a showmatch event that pitted teams from North America against teams from Europe. During this tournament, TSM went up against Lemondogs, and for this the match, Dinh chose to bench himself in favor of Bjergsen. TSM secured a convincing victory in their match, winning by a score of 2–0.

=== 2014–2020: Bjergsen era ===
==== 2014–2017: Domestic dominance ====
In the 2014 NA LCS spring split, Reginald chose to retire from professional play, shifting his focus to team management, and was replaced by Bjergsen. TSM remained competitive with Cloud9 throughout the season. They narrowly missed securing the top spot in the regular-season standings, finishing in second place. In the playoffs, TSM defeated Counter Logic Gaming by a score of 2–1 in the semifinals. However, in the championship match, Cloud9 once again defeated TSM, by a score of 3–0. Bjergsen was named the 2014 spring split MVP. The team made significant changes to their roster prior to the start of the summer split. They replaced OddOne with German import Maurice "Amazing" Stückenschneider and adjusted their bottom lane by signing rookie Nicolas "Gleebglarbu" Haddad in place of Xpecial. Eight games into the summer split, TSM brought in former player Locodoco as their new head coach. Although TSM remained competitive with Cloud9 for a significant portion of the spring split, their dramatically altered starting lineup caused them to slip back into the middle of the pack, finishing third in the standings behind both Cloud9 and the all-Chinese club, LMQ. Before the regular season concluded, TSM elected to replace Gleebglarbu with former South Korean champion Ham "Lustboy" Jang-sik. The team performed well in the playoffs, advancing past the quarterfinals and defeating LMQ in the semifinals, before facing Cloud9 in the finals for the third consecutive postseason. In championship match, TSM defeated Cloud9, winning their second NA LCS title.

During the 2014 League of Legends World Championship in September 2014, Team SoloMid was placed in a group alongside Starhorn Royal Club from China, SK Gaming from Europe, and Taipei Assassins from Taiwan. TSM performed well in the group stage, securing a second-place finish with a 4–2 record, having secured at least one victory against each of the competing teams, and progressed to the knockout stage. In the playoff quarterfinals, TSM faced off against Samsung White but were defeated with a 3–1 scoreline.

In October 2014, Amazing departed from the team to return to Europe, and a month later, the team signed Danish jungler Lucas "Santorin" Tao Kilmer as his replacement.

In the midst of the 2015 NA LCS spring split, in March 2015, Team SoloMid participated in the 2015 IEM World Championship held in Katowice. TSM emerged victorious by defeating Team WE in the finals, claiming the championship title and a grand prize of $108,414. This win made TSM the first American team to win a major League of Legends event since the introduction of Korean teams in international tournaments.

In the 2015 NA LCS spring split, TSM finished the regular season in first place. TSM took home all major awards in the split, with Bjergsen winning his second MVP award, Santoris winning the rookie of the split award, and Locodoco being named the coach of the split. The team went on to defeat Team Impulse in the playoff semifinals, and once again faced Cloud9 in the finals, for the fourth season in a row. While Cloud9 won the first game, TSM took the following three, marking back-to-back final NA LCS titles for TSM. By winning the spring playoffs, TSM was one of six teams to qualify for the inaugural Mid-Season Invitational (MSI), which was held from May 7 to 10, 2015. TSM's performed poorly at the MSI, largely due to their lack of understanding of the prevailing meta. The team failed to advance beyond the group stage. In the following summer split, TSM found difficulties securing a playoff spot, ultimately finishing in fifth place in the standings. TSM's heavy reliance on Bjergsen became increasingly evident, and teams began to exploit their somewhat predictable style of play. However, TSM still qualified for the playoffs. After defeating Gravity Gaming in the quarterfinals, they defeated Team Liquid, the regular-season title holder, in the semifinals by a score of 3–1. The finals took place at Madison Square Garden that season, and TSM faced Counter Logic Gaming, who was competing in their first NA LCS final. TSM was swept by CLG in the finals, finishing in second place.

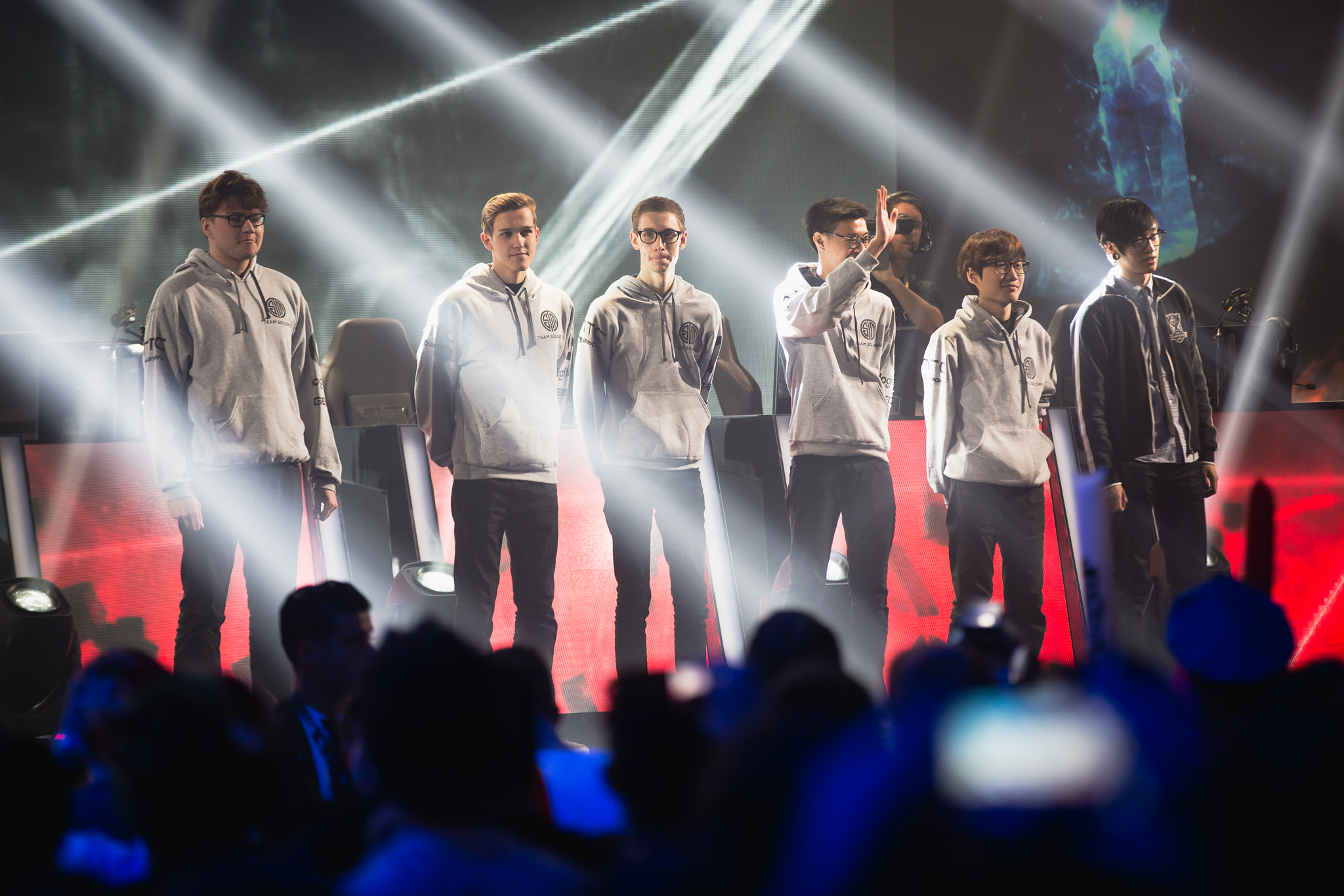
Team SoloMid at Worlds 2015.

TSM qualified for the 2015 League of Legends World Championship, largely due to their performance in the spring split, and were placed in a group that was dubbed the "Group of Death." This group consisted of China's LGD Gaming, South Korea's KT Rolster, and Europe's Origen. In the first week of the tournament, which took place in October 2015, TSM managed to secure a victory. However, during the second week, TSM lost to all three of their opponents and did not progress to the bracket stage of the competition.

Shortly after their performance at the 2015 World Championship, TSM revealed that Lustboy, Dyrus, and Santorin would not be part of the starting roster for the 2016 season. Both Lustboy and Dyrus opted to retire from professional play, while Santorin and the team "mutually parted ways." The team then picked up AD carry player Yiliang "Doublelift" Peng to replace WildTurtle in the starting roster. Shortly after, WildTurtle left the team. In November 2015, the team picked up top laner Kevin "Hauntzer" Yarnell, jungler Dennis "Svenskeren" Jognsen, and support Raymond "KaSing" Tsang. After four days of practice with the new roster, TSM participated in IEM San Jose in November 2015. During the quarterfinals, the team went up against LGD Gaming and secured a 2–0 victory. In the semifinals, they faced off against Origen but ended up losing by a score of 0–2. After the event, KaSing made the decision to leave the team and return to Europe. TSM then signed former Fnatic player Bira "YellOwStaR" Kim as his replacement.

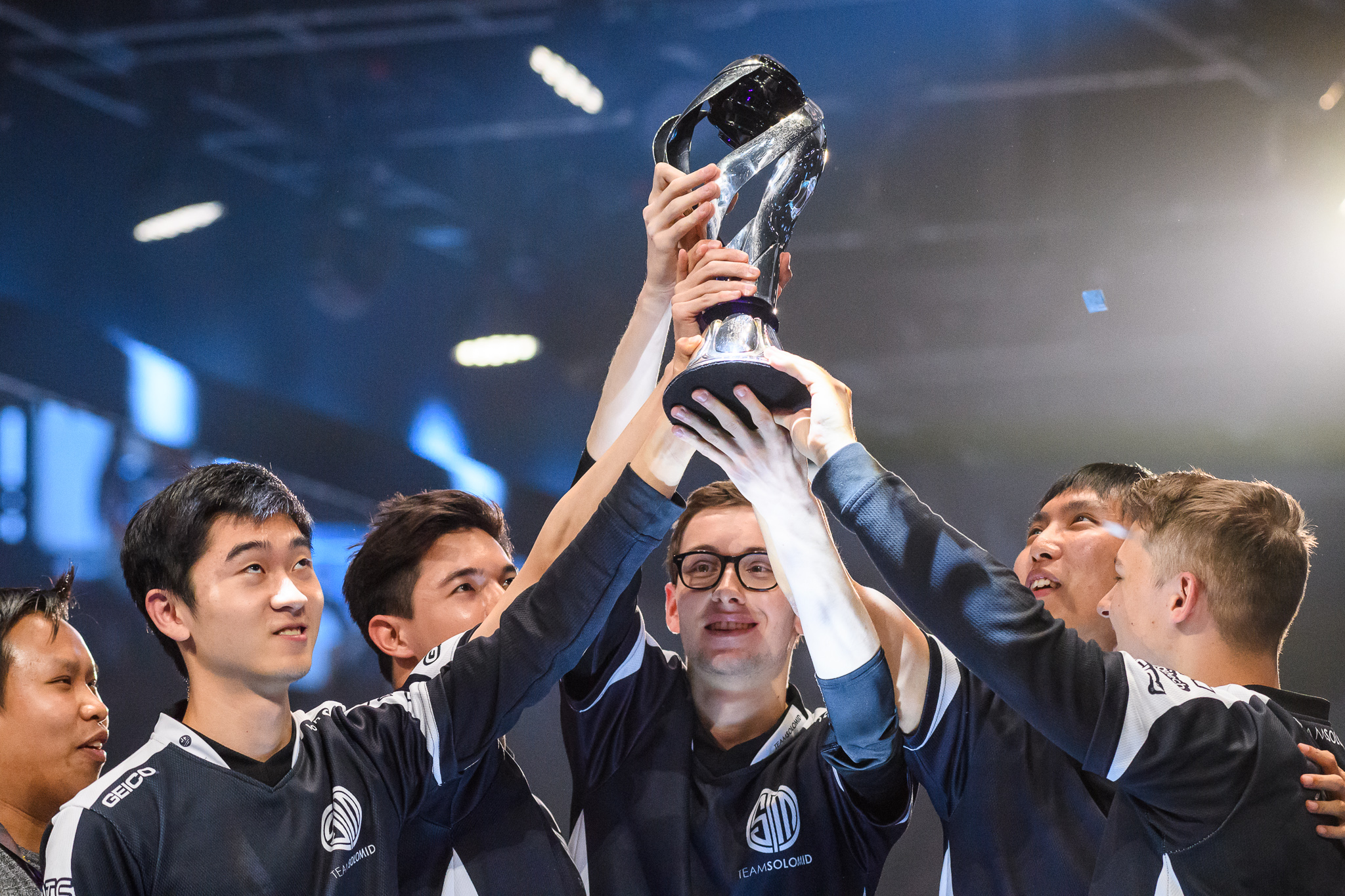
TSM won the 2016 NA LCS Summer Finals.

With their new roster, TSM finished the 2016 NA LCS spring split in sixth place in the standings, with a 9–9 record, marking the franchises worst placement finish, but still qualified for the playoffs. They defeated Cloud9 in the quarterfinals and the top-seeded Immortals in the semifinals to reach the finals for the seventh consecutive time. At the finals in Las Vegas, they faced off against CLG. Once again, TSM was defeated by CLG, this time by a score of 2–3. Prior to the summer split, YellOwStaR left TSM to return to Fnatic. TSM replaced him with a rookie, Vincent "Biofrost" Wang, to fill the support role. TSM only lost one match in the summer split regular season, which was to Phoenix1 after TSM had already secured the top seed heading into the playoffs. The team took home all major awards at the end of the split. Bjergsen won his third MVP title, Biofrost was named the rookie of the split, and Parth was named the coach of the split. In the playoffs, TSM swept CLG, 3–0, in the semifinals. In the finals, which were held in Toronto, TSM defeated Cloud9 by a 3–1 scoreline, winning their fourth league title.

TSM qualified for the 2016 League of Legends World Championship and was put into another "Group of Death." Their group included Samsung Galaxy from Korea, RNG from China, and Europe Splyce from Europe. After the first week of group play, TSM was in a three-way tie for first place, alongside Samsung and RNG. Heading into their final group stage match in week two, TSM had a 3–2 record, and they faced RNG, who had a 2–3 record. TSM lost their match against RNG, resulting in both teams finishing the group stage with 3–3 records. However, RNG held the head-to-head advantage, allowing them to advance to the quarterfinals while TSM was eliminated from the competition.

In November 2016, Doublelift announced that he would be taking the spring split off in order to "recover mentally and refuel," and the team signed their former AD carry WildTurtle as his replacement.

TSM ended the 2017 NA LCS spring split with a record of 15–3 and the top seed in the playoffs. With a bye directly into the semifinals, TSM went on to defeat the fifth-seeded FlyQuest by a 3–0 score. In the title match, TSM faced off against their longtime rivals and second-seeded Cloud9 once again. TSM won the match in a closely contested series, winning 3–2 to secure their fifth NA LCS championship. As a result of winning the spring split, TSM was qualified for the 2017 Mid-Season Invitational. In the play-in stage, their match was against Gigabyte Marines. Despite losing the first two games of the match, TSM managed to reverse sweep their opponents, ultimately winning 3–2 and securing a place in the main event group stage in Rio de Janeiro. In the group stage, TSM finished with a 4–6 record, putting them in a tie with Flash Wolves. To break the tie, a tiebreaker match was played, but TSM lost, leading to their elimination from the event. Doublelift returned to the team for the summer split, splitting time with WildTurtle. TSM ended the summer split as the top of the standings. Bjergsen was named the MVP of the split, giving him his fourth MVP award and becoming the most decorated NA LCS player in history. In the playoffs, TSM won against Team Dignitas in the semifinals to advance to their tenth consecutive NA LCS Finals, where they faced Immortals. In the finals, TSM defeated Immortals by a score of 3–1, winning their third consecutive NA LCS title and sixth overall.

TSM qualified for the 2017 League of Legends World Championship and was drawn into a group along with China's Team WE, Europe's Misfits Gaming, and Taiwan's Flash Wolves. Despite being favored to secure the top seed in the group, TSM finished the group stage with a 3–3 record, matching Misfits, which led to a tiebreaker match. TSM's defeat in the tiebreaker match resulted in a third-place finish in their group, leading to their elimination from the event.

==== 2018–2019: Rebuilding and struggles ====
After three consecutive years of failing to progress beyond the World Championship group stage, TSM made significant roster changes. The team parted ways with Svenskeren, Doublelift, and Biofrost and brought in Michael "MikeYeung" Yueng, Jesper "Zven" Svenningsen, and Alfonso "Mithy" Aguirre Rodriguez as their replacements. Furthermore, head coach Parth Naidy transitioned into an operations role within the organization, and the team signed Kim "SSONG" Sang-soo as their new head coach.

TSM ended the 2018 NA LCS spring split regular season with a record of 11–7, narrowly qualifying for the playoffs. TSM lost their quarterfinals match against Clutch Gaming by a score of 3–1, marking the first time that TSM had failed to qualify for the NA LCS finals. TSM's summer split began with a 5–7 record, but secured a playoff spot by finishing the season with a 10–8 record, winning six of their last eight games. Both of their losses during this period were to Echo Fox, who happened to be their quarterfinals opponent in the playoffs. In the quarterfinals match, TSM defeated Echo fox by a score of 3–1. In the semifinals, they faced their long-time rivals, Cloud9, but TSM lost the match 2–3. They finished the split in third place after defeating 100 Thieves by a score of 3–2 in the third place match.

At the conclusion of the NA LCS season, TSM qualified for the 2018 NA LCS Regional Qualifier gauntlet, which would determine North America's third and final representative for the 2018 League of Legends World Championship. After defeating Echo Fox in the semifinals, the team reached the finals of the gauntlet, then where they faced Cloud9. However, TSM lost the match 0–3, marking the first time in the franchise's history that the team failed to qualify for the World Championship.

After their disappointing performance in the 2018 season, TSM underwent significant roster changes for 2019. The team decided to part ways with Hauntzer, MikeYeung, and Mithy. In their place, TSM brought in Andy "Smoothie" Ta, Sergen "Broken Blade" Çelik, and Jonathan "Grig" Armao. Additionally, the team brought in Tony "Zikz" Gray as their new head coach.

Before the start of the 2019 LCS spring split, Grig was benched due to a wrist injury, and TSM promoted Matthew "Akaadian" Higginbotham from their academy team as his replacement. TSM struggled during the first half of the split, winning only two games in their first three weeks. However, the team turned it around in the latter part of the season, winning 11 of their last 12 games. TSM was matched up against Echo Fox in the quarterfinals, where they secured a 3–1 victory. In the semifinals, they had a comeback victory over Cloud9, winning 3–2 despite losing the first two games of the match. The team advanced to the finals against Team Liquid, taking an early 2–0 lead. However, TSM could not maintain their advantage, losing the following three matches and the series by a final score of 2–3. During the 2019 LCS summer split, Grig returned from his injury and was expected to share the starting jungler role with Akaadian. However, the season proved to be one of TSM's worst in the organization's history as they finished with a 10–8 record. The roster faced significant challenges in the jungle position, with three different junglers, including Mingyi "Spica" Lu, starting matches within an eight-week span, replacing both Grig and Akaadian at various points. For the playoffs, TSM announced that Spica would be their starting jungler. In the playoffs, TSM lost to Clutch Gaming 3–1 in their first match. Despite their early playoff loss, TSM qualified for the Regional Gauntlet, preserving their chance to qualify for the 2019 World Championship. Their opponent was once again Clutch Gaming, and TSM lost the match by a score of 2–3, causing them to miss out on Worlds for the second straight year.

==== 2020: Seventh LCS title ====
In the 2020 off-season, TSM re-signed Bjergsen to a two-year deal and also made him a part owner of the organization. However, the team underwent significant changes to their roster. They parted ways with Zven and brought in Kasper "Kobbe" Kobberup as their new AD carry. Additionally, they made a trade with Counter Logic Gaming, sending Smoothie to CLG in exchange for Biofrost, who returned to TSM as their support player. They also acquired Joshua "Dardoch" Hartnett from Immortals as their jungler. TSM also released head coach Zikz.

TSM finished the 2020 LCS spring split in fifth place with a 9–9 record. The team entered the double-elimination playoffs in the lower bracket. In their first match of the playoffs, they defeated 100 Thieves by a score of 3–2. However, in the next round, TSM was bested by FlyQuest in another close series, with a 3–2 scoreline, which resulted in TSM finishing the split in fourth place. After the spring split, TSM underwent more roster changes, parting ways with both Kobbe and Dardoch. As their replacements, TSM brought back Doublelift, who was acquired from Team Liquid, and promoted jungler Mingyi "Spica" Lu from their academy team. The organization also brought back Parth Naidu as their head coach. To start the summer split, TSM went 7–5, but after winning five of their final six games, they finished with a 12–6 record. Their first playoff match was against Golden Guardians, where TSM faced a setback by losing their initial match, relegating them to the lower bracket. From there, the team defeated Dignitas, Golden Guardians, Cloud9, and Team Liquid to advance to the LCS summer finals. In the finals, TSM faced FlyQuest, and started the match winning the first two games. Although FlyQuest claimed the subsequent two games, TSM won the fifth and final game of the series, clinching their seventh LCS title.

For the first time since 2017, TSM earned a spot at the World Championship, securing the top seed for North America. In the group stage of the 2020 World Championship, TSM was placed into a group with Europe's Fnatic, Korea's Gen.G and China's LGD Gaming. TSM did not progress beyond the group stage, as they were unable to secure a single win, and concluded the stage with an 0–6 record. It was the first instance where a top seed from a major region went winless in the group stage at the World Championship.

=== 2021–2023: Final years in the LCS ===
TSM's roster underwent significant changes after the 2020 season. Both Bjergsen and Doublelift retired from professional play, although Bjergsen stayed with the organization, taking on the role of the team's new head coach. Additionally, Broken Blade and Biofrost were released, leaving Spica as the sole remaining member of the team. The team signed top laner Heo "Huni" Seung-hoon, mid laner Tristan "PowerOfEvil" Schrage, AD carry Lawrence "Lost" Hui, and support Hu "SwordArt" Shuo-Chieh. TSM's contract with SwordArt was a two-year, US$6 million deal, believed to be the highest-paying contract among any esports team in the United States or Canada, as reported by The Washington Post.

In the 2021 LCS spring split, TSM finished the regular season with a record of 12–6, securing the second seed in the playoffs In the playoffs, they faced Team Liquid in the upper bracket quarterfinals and lost 3–1, moving to the lower bracket. In the lower bracket, they managed to defeat 100 Thieves with a 3–1 scoreline, earning a spot in the lower bracket finals. However, their season came to an end when they faced Team Liquid again and lost 1–3 in the lower bracket finals. During the summer split, which marked the first time the spring split regular season record was carried over, TSM clinched the first-place position with a 30–15 record. At the end of the regular season, Spica was named the MVP of the split. In the LCS Championship playoffs, their first match was in the upper bracket semifinals, where they faced Team Liquid and lost with a 1–3 score. Falling to the lower bracket, TSM managed to defeat Immortals in the lower bracket quarterfinals, securing a 3–1 victory. In the lower bracket semifinals, they were up against Cloud9, with the winner also earning an automatic qualification for the 2021 World Championship. However, TSM lost the series 3–2, marking the third time in four years that they missed out on Worlds.

The offseason saw another roster overhaul for TSM. The team parted ways with PowerOfEvil, SwordArt, and Lost. Head coach Bjergsen also left the team, joining Team Liquid. The team subsequently signed AD carry Edward "Tactical" Ra, mid laner Zhu "Keaiduo" Xiong, support Wei "Shenyi" Zi-Jie, and head coach Wong "Chawy" Xing Le.

Through the first half of the 2022 LCS spring split, TSM went 0–4. With the worst start to a season in the organization's history, TSM promoted support player Wang "Yursan" Sheng-Yu from their academy team to replace Shenyi, who was moved to the academy squad. However, these changes did not yield significant improvements, with TSM winning only one of their next five games. This led to another roster adjustment, with TSM recalling Shenyi and mid laner Ji "Takeover" Cha Hyeun-min from their academy team and sending Yursan and Keaiduo to the academy roster. TSM concluded the split with a franchise-worst 5–13 record, securing the ninth place in the standings. This marked the first time in franchise history that they did not qualify for the LCS playoffs. Prior to the start of the summer split, TSM signed mid laner Huang "Maple" Yi-Tang in place of Takeover. In July, during the middle of the split, Huni stepped down from the starting roster due to a wrist injury and transitioned to a coaching position a week later. Additionally, the team brought in three rookies, bot laner Tony "Instinct" Ng, top laner Alex "Soul" Luo, and support Jonathan "Chime" Pomponio, to replace Huni, Tactical, and Mia. Shortly after, Soul requested to return to TSM's academy team, and the team acquired veteran Colin "Solo" Earnest. The team finished the split in seventh place, with a 6–12 record.

For the 2023 LCS spring split, the organization decided to part ways with Instinct and Spica while signing jungler Lee "Bugi" Seong-yeop and AD carry Toàn "Neo" Trần. After a 5–6 start in the spring split, TSM sent Neo down to their academy squad and brought back WildTurtle as their starting AD carry. The team won three of their final seven games, finishing with an 8–10 record, which tied them for seventh place. In between splits, TSM parted ways with Solo and Maple, signing mid laners Lee "Ruby" Sol-min and David "Insanity" Challe. During the summer split regular season, TSM finished with an 8–10 record. As the sixth seed in the LCS playoffs, the team started in the upper bracket but lost in the upper bracket quarterfinals against Evil Geniuses. They were subsequently sent to the lower bracket, where they lost their match against Dignitas.

TSM made the official announcement in May 2023 that they would exit the LCS with the intention of competing in a different region after actively working towards this transition for several years. The organization sold its LCS slot in September 2023 to Shopify Rebellion.

== Records and achievements ==
=== Season-by-season ===
Year	Domestic								Mid-Season Invitational	World Championship
Year	League	Split	P	W	L	W–L%	Pos.	Playoffs	Mid-Season Invitational	World Championship
2011	—N/a								—N/a	Lower final
2012	—N/a								—N/a	Quarterfinals
2013	NA LCS	Spring	28	21	7	.750	1st	Winners	—N/a	Group stage
2013	NA LCS	Summer	28	14	14	.500	3rd	Runners-up	—N/a	Group stage
2014	NA LCS	Spring	28	22	6	.786	2nd	Runners-up	—N/a	Quarterfinals
2014	NA LCS	Summer	28	16	12	.571	3rd	Winners	—N/a	Quarterfinals
2015	NA LCS	Spring	18	13	5	.722	1st	Winners	Group stage	Group stage
2015	NA LCS	Summer	18	11	7	.611	5th	Runners-up	Group stage	Group stage
2016	NA LCS	Spring	18	9	9	.500	6th	Runners-up	Did not qualify	Group stage
2016	NA LCS	Summer	18	17	1	.944	1st	Winners	Did not qualify	Group stage
2017	NA LCS	Spring	18	15	3	.833	1st	Winners	Group stage	Group stage
2017	NA LCS	Summer	18	14	4	.778	1st	Winners	Group stage	Group stage
2018	NA LCS	Spring	18	11	7	.611	5th	Quarterfinals	Did not qualify	Did not qualify
2018	NA LCS	Summer	18	10	8	.556	5th	Quarterfinals	Did not qualify	Did not qualify
2019	LCS	Spring	18	13	5	.722	3rd	Runners-up	Did not qualify	Did not qualify
2019	LCS	Summer	18	12	6	.667	2nd	Runners-up	Did not qualify	Did not qualify
2020	LCS	Spring	18	9	9	.500	5th	Lower semifinals	Did not qualify (Note: The event was cancelled due to COVID-19, but TSM did not qualify for the 2020 Mid-Season Invitational before the event was cancelled.)	Group stage
2020	LCS	Summer	18	12	6	.667	4th	Winners	Did not qualify	Group stage
2021	LCS	Spring	45	30	15	.667	2nd	Lower finals	Did not qualify	Did not qualify
2021	LCS	Summer	45	30	15	.667	1st	Lower semifinals	Did not qualify	Did not qualify
2022	LCS	Spring	18	5	13	.278	9th	Did not qualify	Did not qualify	Did not qualify
2022	LCS	Summer	18	6	12	.333	7th	Lower quarterfinals	Did not qualify	Did not qualify
2023	LCS	Spring	18	8	10	.444	7th	Did not qualify	Did not qualify	Did not qualify
2023	LCS	Summer	18	8	10	.444	6th	Lower first round	Did not qualify	Did not qualify
Totals			445	276	169	.620	(2013–2023, includes only regular season)			

=== Other championships ===
- 2011 MLG National Championship
- 2012 IGN ProLeague Season 4
- 2012 Reign of Gaming International Invitational
- 2012 MLG Spring Championship
- 2012 IPL Face Off: San Francisco Showdown
- 2015 Intel Extreme Masters Season IX – Katowice
- 2017 League of Legends Rift Rivals (EU vs NA)

== Accomplishments and awards ==
LCS Most Valuable Player

- Bjergsen – Spring 2014, Spring 2015, Summer 2016, Summer 2017
- Spica – Summer 2021

LCS Rookie of the Split

- Santorin – Spring 2014, Spring 2015
- Biofrost – Summer 2016

LCS Coach of the Split

- Locodoco – Spring 2014, Spring 2015
- Parth – Summer 2016

LCS All-Pro First Team

- Bjergsen – Spring 2014, Summer 2016, Spring 2017, Spring 2018, Spring 2019, Summer 2020
- Xpecial – Spring 2014
- Doublelift – Summer 2016, Summer 2017
- Hauntzer – Summer 2016, Spring 2017
- Biofrost – Summer 2016
- Spica – Summer 2021

LCS All-Pro Second Team

- Dyrus – Spring 2014
- Svenskeren – Summer 2015, Summer 2016, Summer 2017
- Biofrost – Spring 2017
- Hauntzer – Summer 2017, Spring 2018
- Zven – Spring 2018
- PowerOfEvil – Spring 2021

LCS All-Pro Third Team

- Bjergsen – Spring 2016, Summer 2018, Summer 2019
- Broken Blade – Spring 2019, Spring 2020
- Zven – Spring 2019
- Biofrost – Spring 2020
- Huni – Spring 2021
- SwordArt – Spring 2021, Summer 2021
- PowerOfEvil – Summer 2021

Sources: (Note: 2014: 2015: 2016: 2017: 2018: 2019: 2020: 2021:)

== Naming sponsorships ==
In February 2013, Team SoloMid expanded their name to "Team SoloMid Snapdragon" after securing a sponsorship deal with Qualcomm. This partnership also involved a collaboration with CBS Interactive. As part of the sponsorship, TSM Snapdragon participated in a weekly web series called "Gamecrib," which premiered on February 20 and ran until June 14, 2013.

In June 2021, TSM signed a 10 year, $210 million naming rights deal with cryptocurrency exchange FTX, renaming the organization to TSM FTX. However, Riot Games did not permit TSM to use its new name and branding in League of Legends broadcasts. According to Riot's partnership guidelines, name and jersey sponsorships with cryptocurrency exchanges were considered a violation, and while the LCS approved TSM's partnership with FTX, they imposed specific restrictions on the use of FTX branding. As a result, TSM FTX players participating in LCS or other professional League of Legends events were not allowed to display the FTX logo on their jerseys. The sponsorship deal ended in November 2022, after the bankruptcy of FTX.
