= Jensen (gamer) =

Danish professional League of Legends player

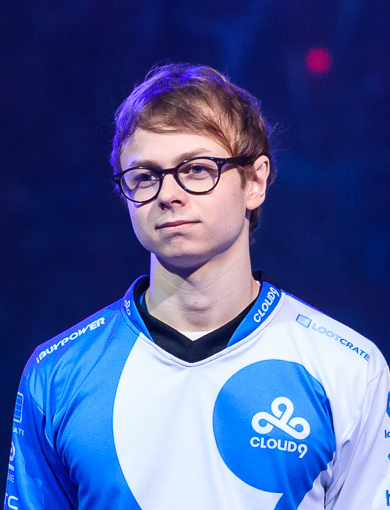
- Jensen in 2016

Personal information
- Name: Nicolaj Jensen
- Nationality: Danish

Career information
- Games: League of Legends
- Playing career: 2012–2025
- Role: Mid Laner

Team history

As player:
- 2012–2013: Team Solo Mebdi
- 2015–2018: Cloud9
- 2019–2021: Team Liquid
- 2022: Cloud9
- 2023: Dignitas
- 2024: FlyQuest
- 2024: Dignitas

As coach:
- 2014: SK Gaming

Career highlights and awards
- Rift Rivals champion (2017); 3× LCS champion; 4× LCS All–Pro First Team; LCS Lock In champion (2021)

Nicolaj Jensen, better known mononymously as Jensen, is a Danish former professional League of Legends player for Dignitas. Earlier in his career, he was known as Veigodx and Incarnati0n. Jensen began as a player for Team Solo Mebdi, a team attempting to enter the European LCS via qualifier. He was banned for toxicity and DDOS attacks against other players. After his ban was lifted, Incarnati0n joined NA LCS team Cloud9 in 2015, replacing founding mid laner and strategist Hai on the roster, who had announced his retirement. In 2019, he joined Doublelift and former teammate Impact on Team Liquid. He was released from Team Liquid after the 2021 season in favor of his rival Bjergsen, who took over his position on Team Liquid. In 2022, he rejoined Cloud9, and in 2023, he joined Dignitas. In 2024, Jensen joined FlyQuest.

He is considered one of the best mid laners in North America, competing for the spot of best NA mid laner against Bjergsen. A 2022 retrospective by the LCS staff voted Jensen as the 2nd greatest LCS mid laner of all time, behind only Bjergsen.

== Early career in European leagues ==
In early 2013, Nicolaj Jensen, then known by the screenname Veigodx, was part of Team Solo Mebdi, a team that hoped to qualify for the EU LCS. The team was barred from the tournament after Veigodx and two other players on it were banned. Veigodx was given an indefinite ban from League of Legends servers and the LCS after verbally abusing and performing DDOS attacks against other players online. Unable to compete directly in Riot-sanctioned events, in 2014, he served as a coach for SK Gaming.

== Cloud9 ==
Jensen's ban was lifted in March 2015 after a Riot investigation found that he had markedly improved his behavior and ceased getting negative reports from other players, nor was he continuing to DDOS players. Jensen moved to North America and joined Cloud9 in 2015. In having long-time member Hai transition off the team, Jensen would join Sneaky, Meteos, and incoming coach Reapered to challenge the other teams in the NA LCS. Although they did not place very high in the standings during Jensen's first two splits of being on Cloud9, they still qualified for Worlds. In Summer 2016, Cloud9 would add Impact and Smoothie and begin challenging Team SoloMid for the title. Even though they came close to winning the NA LCS several times, Jensen and his teammates were never able to pull it off. In Summer 2018, longtime players Jensen, Sneaky, and Smoothie were benched from the main team and sent to the academy team by the coaching staff after a poor start to the season, which resulted in a community backlash. They were subbed back onto the team after a few weeks, and this time placed second, behind Team Liquid which finished first. During Jensen's time on Cloud9, the team would become known for having the most international success of the LCS qualifying teams despite not becoming champions of the region. At the 2018 World Championships, Jensen led the team to semifinals, where they ultimately fell to Fnatic.

== Team Liquid ==
In 2019, Jensen would move on from Cloud9 to join Team Liquid, replacing Pobelter. The star-studded Team Liquid roster then included other players such as Impact, Xmithie, Doublelift, and CoreJJ. In Spring 2019, Jensen would earn his first LCS title and then place second at the Mid-Season Invitational. In the following Summer split, Jensen would win his second trophy and bring Team Liquid to its record of four titles in a row. Even though Jensen and Team Liquid had success all year, at the World Championships, Team Liquid would not pass the group stage into the knockout stage. In 2020, more roster changes occurred with Broxah replacing Xmithie in the Spring Split and in the Summer Split, Doublelift leaving. Without Doublelift, Jensen became the main carry of the team and proved himself to be one of the best NA mid laners of all time. Following the 2020 World Championship, Jensen re-signed with Team Liquid for a three-year extension worth $4.2 million. In 2021, Team Liquid placed 2nd in both the Spring Split and the Summer Split, which qualified them from Worlds. They were eliminated in Groups as their 3–3 record was not enough to advance to the quarterfinals.

Despite the contract lasting 2 more years, Jensen was released from Team Liquid at the end of 2021. Jensen's mid-laner rival Bjergsen decided to return from retirement and resume play, and Team Liquid promptly signed him in November 2021. No other team signed Jensen for the 2022 Spring Split, possibly due to the late release as they had already signed and announced other mid laners.

== Recent career ==
Jensen was signed by Cloud9 again for the 2022 summer split. During Spring, Cloud9 had played Korean import Summit in top lane and their long-time top-laner Fudge in mid-lane; with the signing of Jensen, Jensen become the new mid laner, and Fudge returned to top lane. Jensen was released from Cloud9 in November 2022, and joined Dignitas for the 2023 season. After a disappointing year with the team, Jensen was released and then signed by FlyQuest for Spring 2024. He was later benched by FlyQuest for Korean import Quad after Spring 2024 and rejoined Dignitas for that year's Summer split.

== Tournament results ==
=== SK Gaming ===
Date	Event	Placement
November 28 – December 1, 2013	DreamHack Winter 2013	(gold) 1st
September 18 – October 19, 2014	2014 World Championship	9th–11th

=== Cloud9 ===
- 7th — 2015 Summer NA LCS regular season
- 9th–11th — 2015 World Championship
- 3rd — 2016 Spring NA LCS regular season
- 5th–6th — 2016 Spring NA LCS playoffs
- 3rd — 2016 Summer NA LCS regular season
- 2nd — 2016 Summer NA LCS playoffs
- 5th–8th — 2016 World Championship
- 2nd — 2017 Spring NA LCS regular season
- 2nd — 2017 Spring NA LCS playoffs
- 4th — 2017 Summer NA LCS regular season
- 5th–6th — 2017 Summer NA LCS playoffs
- 5th–8th — 2017 World Championship
- 5th — 2018 Spring NA LCS regular season
- 5th–6th — 2018 Summer NA LCS playoffs
- 2nd — 2018 Summer NA LCS regular season
- 2nd — 2018 Summer NA LCS playoffs
- 3rd–4th — 2018 World Championship
- 1st — 2022 Summer LCS Championship

=== Team Liquid ===
- 1st — 2019 Spring LCS regular season
- 1st — 2019 Spring LCS playoffs
- 2nd — 2019 Mid-Season Invitational
- 1st — 2019 Summer LCS regular season
- 1st — 2019 Summer LCS playoffs
- 9th–16th — 2019 World Championship
- 1st — 2020 Summer LCS regular season
- 3rd — 2020 Summer LCS playoffs
- 9th–16th — 2020 World Championship
- 1st — 2021 LCS Lock-In playoffs
- 3rd — 2021 LCS Spring Regular Season
- 2nd — 2021 LCS Mid-Season Showdown
- 5th — 2021 LCS Summer Regular Season
- 2nd — 2021 LCS Championship

=== FlyQuest ===
- 1st — 2024 LCS Spring Regular Season
- 2nd — 2024 LCS Spring Playoffs
- 9th–10th — Mid Season Invitational

== See also ==
- Tyler1, a League of Legends live streamer that was similarly indefinitely banned and later unbanned.
