= Team Dragon Knights =

Former professional League of Legends team

- Short name: TDK
- Game: League of Legends
- Founded: September 2014
- Folded: May 23, 2016
- Owner: Chris "Greenf0rest" Shim; Sean "TriS" Shim; Alan Hubbard
- Manager: Toby Kwon
- Partners: Micro-Star International
- Website: tdk.gg

Team Dragon Knights, briefly known as Team Arena Online, was an American professional League of Legends team. For most of its history the team competed in the North American League of Legends Challenger Series, but was briefly in the North American League of Legends Championship Series during the 2015 Summer Split before being relegated.

== History ==
The team was formed in September 2014 by manager Sean Shim. They qualified for the ESL LCS Expansion Tournament via the Challenger ladder but did not participate in the tournament. However, after undergoing a number of roster changes they qualified for the spring season of the North American Challenger Series, beating Team Frostbite and Storm in the qualifier. In the Challenger Series, which took place from February 17 through March 28, 2015, TDK placed second in the season with a 7–3 record, behind Enemy eSports. In the playoffs, which ran from March 31, 2015, through April 1, 2015, they beat Team Fusion 2–1 before losing to Enemy 1–3, sending them to the Summer Promotion Tournament.

Despite the fact that they had placed higher than Fusion, Winterfox chose to play against them in their LCS relegation match on April 26, 2015. Prior to the match, mid laner Kyle chose to retire. TDK used temporary substitute mid laner Alex Ich from Renegades in the matches and won in a 3–1 upset, successfully qualifying for the 2015 NA LCS Summer Split. After the match Alex Ich chose to remain with his previous team. TDK attempted to buy out Altec's contract from Winterfox as Altec was planning on leaving the team, however he chose to join Gravity Gaming instead.

On May 18, 2015, TDK announced their summer split final roster, consisting of Seraph, Kez, Ninja, Emperor, and Smoothie. The team went on a seven-game losing streak when they were unable to use Emperor and Ninja on the starting roster because of delayed visas. They finished the LCS summer split in last place with a 3–15 record, eliminating them from the playoffs and relegating them back to the Challenger Series. On September 23, 2015, the team announced it would be renamed as Team Arena Online after new sponsor Arena Online, a tournament organizing company based in Houston, Texas. However, the team was forced to revert to their old name by Riot Games after Arena Online failed to deliver on their promises of creating a million dollar tournament circuit.

TDK was permanently banned from Riot-sponsored events on May 8, 2016, after Riot released a competitive ruling stating that there was an "inappropriate" connection between TDK and LCS team Renegades, with sources of financial compensation to players being a primary reason.

== Notable players ==
- Alex Ich
- Remilia
- Smoothie
