= Andy Dinh =

American entrepreneur and former esports player

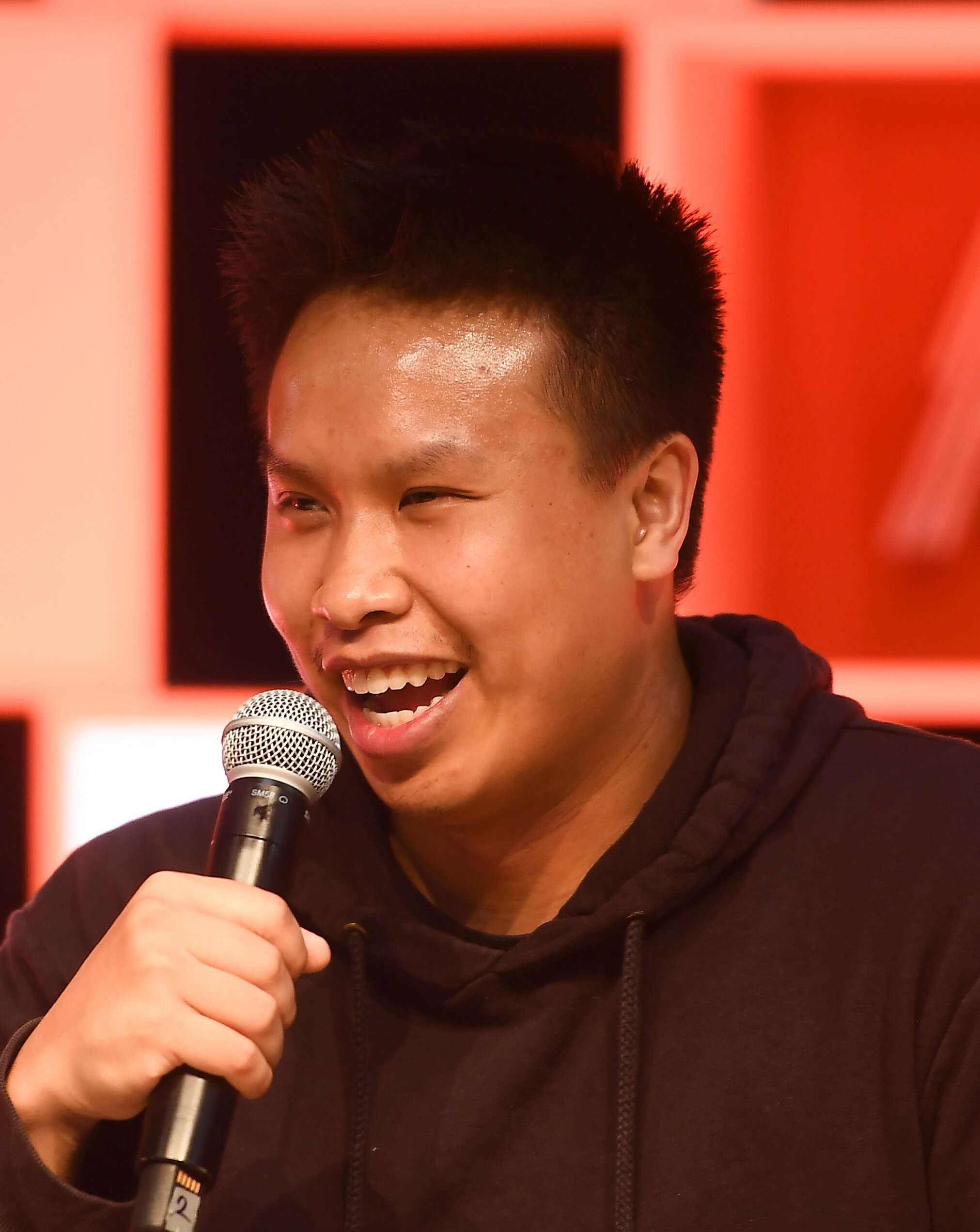
- Dinh in 2019
- Born: April 19, 1992 (age 34)
- Title: CEO of Team SoloMid
- Relatives: Dan Dinh (brother)

Esports career information
- Games: League of Legends
- Playing career: 2009–2013
- Role: Mid

Team history
- 2009–2011: All or Nothing
- 2011–2013: Team SoloMid

Andy Dinh (born April 19, 1992), better known as Reginald, is an American entrepreneur and former professional League of Legends player. He is the founder, owner, and CEO of Team SoloMid (TSM), an esports organization best known for its League of Legends team in the League Championship Series (LCS).

As a former player, he was the first mid laner for TSM.

== Professional gaming career ==
Dinh began playing League of Legends in the Closed Beta in 2008. Playing alongside his brother, Dan Dinh, he quickly became one of the most recognizable players in the game's sprouting player base. Andy and his brother then formed one of the earliest competitive League of Legends teams, team All or Nothing, during the League of Legends closed beta in September 2009. Around this time, he also founded the SoloMid website, one of the first websites dedicated to League of Legends, which also doubled as a website for his team. In early 2011, after disagreements between himself and Dan Dinh, All or Nothing disbanded and Andy "Reginald" Dinh went on to found Team SoloMid (TSM) as its mid lane and captain. At the Season 1 League of Legends World Championship in 2011, TSM took 3rd place and $10,000. TSM made many appearances at several independent tournaments, including a second-place finish at Intel Extreme Masters Season VI and a first-place finish at Major League Gaming's Providence tournament.

Going into League of Legends Season 2, TSM suffered losses while facing the Russian-based team Moscow 5 at Intel Extreme Masters Hanover and Kyiv events. Following these defeats, notable founding member Christian "The Rain Man" Kahmann resigned from the team citing differences in interests and TSM subsequently picked up Marcus "Dyrus" Hill to fill the empty spot, as he was already living in the TSM house. After these changes, Dinh and TSM went on to win several North American events during spring and summer. Following a 1st Place victory at the North American regionals, TSM became one of the teams playing at Riot Games's Season 2 World Championships in Los Angeles, where they were defeated 2–0 by Azubu Frost and placed 5th–8th with a prize of $75,000. Two months later in December, they placed 9th–12th in the IGN Pro League Season 5 to win $1,500.

Reginald retired from competition at the end of 2013. He made a brief appearance as TSM's mid laner in Week 7 of the 2014 NA LCS Spring Split due to Bjergsen returning to Denmark to renew his United States visa.

== Accusations of workplace bullying ==
Several current and former employees and players of TSM have accused Dinh of workplace bullying, including verbal abuse. Riot Games and TSM both launched their own investigations into the accusations in late 2021. However, accusations had arisen as early as 2011. Following the investigation, Riot Games found Dinh guilty of disparaging and bullying behavior and TSM was fined $75,000, with Dinh being ordered to complete sensitivity and executive training.
