= Hauntzer =

American professional esports player

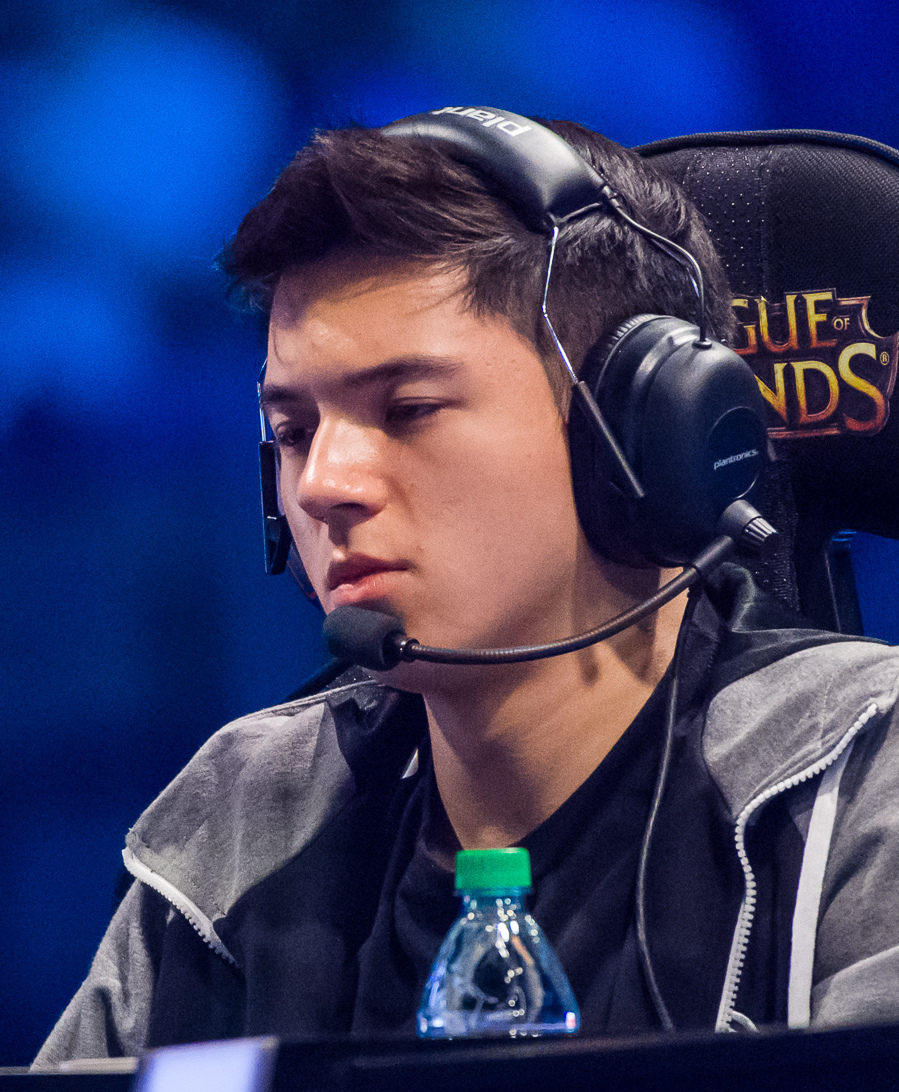
- Yarnell in 2016

Personal information
- Name: Kevin Yarnell
- Nationality: American

Career information
- Game: League of Legends
- Role: Toplaner

Team history
- 2013: The Gentlemen's Guild
- 2013–2014: Team LoLPro
- 2014: Curse Academy
- 2015: Gravity Gaming
- 2016–2018: Team SoloMid
- 2019–2020: Golden Guardians
- 2021: TSM Academy
- 2023: TSM Challengers
- 2023: TSM
- 2023: Shopify Rebellion

Kevin Yarnell, better known by his in-game name Hauntzer, is a professional League of Legends player who is currently a free agent, and was most recently a part of TSM Academy as their toplaner. He has also played for Team SoloMid, Golden Guardians, and Gravity Gaming in the League of Legends Championship Series.

== Career ==
Curse Academy left Team Curse and rebranded as Gravity Gaming in January 2015 upon qualifying for the LCS. In April, Gravity was at the top of the NA LCS rankings in part due to the play of Hauntzer. Gravity finished 5th in the Spring LCS Regular Season, qualifying for the playoffs, where they finished 5-6th after being eliminated by Team Impulse. In the following Summer LCS they finished 4th in the Regular Season and then 5-6th in the playoffs.

Yarnell joined Team SoloMid in November, replacing Marcus "Dyrus" Hill at top lane after the latter retired from competitive play. At his first tournament with TSM, Intel Extreme Masters Season X - San Jose, the team finished 5-8th.

Yarnell spent three years with Team SoloMid, and won three titles with the team. He was released after the 2018 season following the organization's failure to qualify for the World Championship.

Golden Guardians signed Yarnell for the 2019 season, and he spent two years with the organization before Golden Guardians ran into funding problems were forced to drop their entire roster, including Yarnell.

After failing to find a team in the LCS, Yarnell accepted a spot on an academy roster with Team SoloMid.

After the 2021 season playing in Academy, Yarnell was released.

== Tournament results ==
- 5th — North American League of Legends Championship Series Spring 2015 Regular Season (Gravity)
- 5th–6th — North American League of Legends Championship Series Spring 2015 Playoffs (Gravity)
- 4th — North American League of Legends Championship Series Spring 2015 Regular Season (Gravity)
- 5th–6th — North American League of Legends Championship Series Spring 2015 Regular Season (Gravity)
- 5th–8th — Intel Extreme Masters Season X - San Jose (Team SoloMid)
- 2nd — North American League of Legends Championship Series Spring 2016 Regular Season (Team SoloMid)
- 1st — 2016 NA LCS Summer regular season
- 1st — 2016 NA LCS Summer playoffs
- 9th–12th — 2016 League of Legends World Championship
