= Biofrost =

Canadian League of Legends player

Vincent Wang
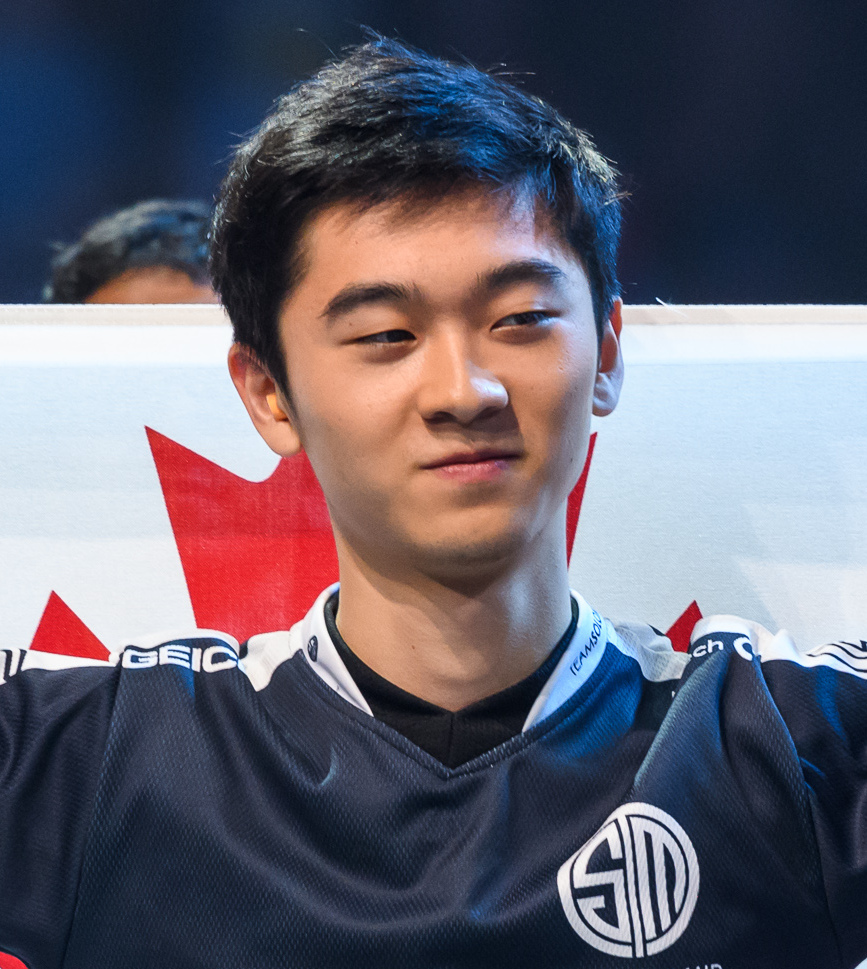
- Wang in 2016

Personal information
- Name: Vincent Wang
- Born: 17 September 1996 (age 30)
- Nationality: Canadian

Current team
- Team: Dignitas
- Role: Support
- Game: League of Legends

Career information
- Playing career: 2015–present

Team history
- 2015: Team Frostbite
- 2015: Elomingle
- 2015: Final Five
- 2015: Vortex
- 2015–2016: Also Known As
- 2016: Dream Team
- 2016–2017: Team SoloMid
- 2017–2019: Counter Logic Gaming
- 2019–2020: Team SoloMid
- 2021–2023: Dignitas

Career highlights and awards
- NA LCS champion (Summer 2016)

Vincent Wang, better known by his in-game name Biofrost, is a Canadian former League of Legends player and streamer and content creator.

== Career ==
Wang's gaming career began in the NA Challenger Series, playing for teams such as Team Frostbite, Vortex and Dream Team. Following the departure of YellOwStaR after the 2016 NA LCS Spring Split, Wang tried out for Team SoloMid's vacant support position. He would join TSM on their Korean bootcamp, eventually being chosen as their starting support for the 2016 Summer NA LCS Split. Despite his rookie status, TSM finished the split in first place with a 17–1 record, dropping a single match to Phoenix1. In the playoffs, TSM would go on to defeat CLG 3–0 and Cloud9 3–1. Additionally, Wang received the award for Rookie of the Split.

After such a dominant Summer Split, expectations for Wang and TSM were high for the 2016 League of Legends World Championship. The team was placed in Group D, alongside Samsung Galaxy, Royal Never Give Up, and Splyce. However, the team was unable to advance past the group stage, finishing in third with a record of 3–3.

In 2017, Wang continued to play for TSM, finishing first in the regular season and playoffs of both the Spring and Summer Splits. He also attended the 2017 Mid-Season Invitational and 2017 League of Legends World Championship, failing to advance past the group stages of both tournaments. Following the disappointing showing at Worlds 2017, TSM decided to rework its League of Legends roster, dropping Wang in favor of European import, mithy. TSM then sold Wang's contract to Counter Logic Gaming, whom Wang would play for in 2018. In the 2018 NA LCS Spring Split, Wang and CLG would finish in 7th place, narrowly missing the playoffs.

Wang announced he would take a break from professional League of Legends for the 2021 Spring season.

In December 2021, Wang joined Dignitas.

In March 2023, Wang left Dignitas' active roster, and then rejoined them as a streamer and content creator until he left at the end of 2023.

== Tournament awards ==
4-times LCS Champions (Summer 2016, Spring 2017, Summer 2017, Summer 2020).

Rift Rivals 2017 NA-EU Champions

== Personal life ==
Wang came out as gay on May 7, 2022.
