= 2020 LCS season =

Eighth season of North America's League of Legends Championship Series

- League: LCS
- Sport: League of Legends
- Duration: January 25 – April 19 (Spring); June 12 – September 6 (Summer)
- Teams: 10
- TV partners: English: ESPN2, Twitch, YouTube; Chinese: Huya

Spring
- Champions: Cloud9
- Runners-up: FlyQuest
- Top seed: Cloud9
- Season MVP: Robert "Blaber" Huang

Summer
- Champions: Team SoloMid
- Runners-up: FlyQuest
- Top seed: Team Liquid
- Season MVP: Jo "CoreJJ" Yong-in

LCS seasons
- ← 2019 2021 →

The 2020 LCS season was the eighth season of the League of Legends Championship Series (LCS), a professional esports league for the video game League of Legends. The season was divided into two splits: Spring and Summer. The Spring Split began on January 25 and culminated playoff finals on April 19, 2020. The Summer Split began on June 12 and culminated with the Spring Split finals on September 6, 2020. Most matches were played online due to the COVID-19 pandemic.

Cloud9 won the spring split playoffs, qualifying them for the 2020 Mid-Season Invitational (MSI). However, the MSI was cancelled due to the COVID-19 pandemic. In the summer split playoffs, Team SoloMid, FlyQuest, and Team Liquid claimed the first, second, and third positions, respectively, earning qualifications to the 2020 World Championship.

== Format changes ==
For the 2020 season, the league implemented a series of format changes. The league removed the "Championship points" system that was introduced in 2015. In this new structure, victories during the spring split would solely serve to qualify a team for the Mid-Season Invitational. The regional qualifying tournament, which was used to advance teams to the World Championship, was also eliminated. Instead, the top three teams from the summer split playoffs earned the right to advance to the World Championship. The LCS also changed its playoff format to a double-elimination bracket, and the number of teams participating summer playoffs was increased from six to eight.

== Spring ==
The Spring Split regular season ran from January 25 to March 22, 2020. The regular season followed a standard double round-robin format, where each team faced every other team twice, and each game was played in a best-of-one format. In response to the COVID-19 pandemic, LCS commissioner Chris Greeley announced the suspension of the 2020 season on March 13, 2020, with no definite timeframe for resumption. Subsequently, the LCS resumed its competitions through online play, starting on April 18, 2020.

The top six teams from the regular season advanced to the playoffs, a double-elimination tournament, which ran from March 28 to April 19, 2020. The top four teams started in the upper bracket of the playoffs, and the fifth and sixth seeds started in the lower bracket. The top-seeded team had their selection for their first round opponents between the third seed and the fourth seed. The winner of the playoffs would advance to the 2020 Mid-Season Invitational (MSI). However, the 2020 MSI was cancelled due to the COVID-19 pandemic.

The lower bracket final and grand final were planned to take place at the Ford Center in Frisco, Texas. However, due to the COVID-19 pandemic, the event was moved to Riot's Los Angeles studio.

=== Regular season ===
Pos	Team	Pld	W	L	PCT	Qualification
1	Cloud9	18	17	1	.944	Advance to upper semifinals
2	Evil Geniuses	19	11	8	.579	Advance to upper semifinals
3	100 Thieves	20	11	9	.550	Advance to upper semifinals
4	FlyQuest	19	10	9	.526	Advance to upper semifinals
5	Team SoloMid	18	9	9	.500	Advance to lower quarterfinals
6	Golden Guardians	19	9	10	.474	Advance to lower quarterfinals
7	Dignitas	20	9	11	.450	
8	Immortals	19	8	11	.421	
9	Team Liquid	18	7	11	.389	
10	Counter Logic Gaming	18	3	15	.167	

Source: LoL Esports

=== Playoffs ===
==== Bracket ====
Upper semifinals	Upper final	Final
1	Cloud9	3
3	100 Thieves	0
1	Cloud9	3
2	Evil Geniuses	1
2	Evil Geniuses	3
4	FlyQuest	1
1	Cloud9	3
Lower quarterfinals	Lower semifinal	Lower final	4	FlyQuest	0
3	100 Thieves	2
2	Evil Geniuses	1
5	Team SoloMid	3
5	Team SoloMid	2	4	FlyQuest	3
4	FlyQuest	3
4	FlyQuest	3
6	Golden Guardians	0

==== Final standings ====
Pos	Team	Qualification
1	Cloud9	2020 Mid-Season Invitational (Note: The 2020 Mid-Season Invitational was cancelled due to the COVID-19 pandemic.)
2	FlyQuest	
3	Evil Geniuses	
4	Team SoloMid	
5–6	100 Thieves	
5–6	Golden Guardians	

=== Awards ===
- 1st Team All-Pro:
  - T Licorice, Cloud9
  - J Blaber, Cloud9
  - M Nisqy, Cloud9
  - B Zven, Cloud9
  - S Vulcan, Cloud9
- 2nd Team All-Pro:
  - T Ssumday, 100 Thieves
  - J Closer, Golden Guardians
  - M Jiizuke, Evil Geniuses
  - B Bang, Evil Geniuses
  - S IgNar, FlyQuest
- 3rd Team All-Pro:
  - T Broken Blade, Team SoloMid
  - J Santorin, FlyQuest
  - M PowerOfEvil, FlyQuest
  - B Cody Sun, 100 Thieves
  - S Biofrost, Team SoloMid
- Most Valuable Player: Blaber, Cloud9
- Coaching Staff of the Split: Cloud9

== Summer ==
The Summer Split regular season was planned to run from June 20 to August 16, 2020. However, due to the cancellation of the 2020 MSI, the starting date was pushed forward to June 13. The Summer Split regular season followed the same format as the Spring Split. The top eight teams from the summer regular season secured spots in the Summer Split playoffs, which ran from August 20 to September 13, 2020. The playoffs played as a featured a double-elimination tournament, with top two teams starting in the upper bracket semifinals, the following four starting in the upper bracket quarterfinals, and the remaining two starting in the lower bracket. The top three teams from the playoffs qualified for the 2020 League of Legends World Championship.

=== Regular season ===
Pos	Team	Pld	W	L	PCT	Qualification
1	Team Liquid	18	15	3	.833	Advance to upper semifinals
2	Cloud9	18	13	5	.722	Advance to upper semifinals
3	FlyQuest	18	12	6	.667	Advance to upper quarterfinals
4	Team SoloMid	18	12	6	.667	Advance to upper quarterfinals
5	Golden Guardians	18	9	9	.500	Advance to upper quarterfinals
6	Evil Geniuses	18	8	10	.444	Advance to upper quarterfinals
7	100 Thieves	18	7	11	.389	Advance to lower round 1
8	Dignitas	19	6	13	.316	Advance to lower round 1
9	Counter Logic Gaming	19	5	14	.263	
10	Immortals	18	4	14	.222	

Source: LoL Esports

=== Playoffs ===
==== Bracket ====
Upper quarterfinals	Upper semifinals	Upper final	Final
1	Team Liquid	3
4	Team SoloMid	0	5	Golden Guardians	0
5	Golden Guardians	3	1	Team Liquid	2
3	FlyQuest	3
2	Cloud9	1
3	FlyQuest	3	3	FlyQuest	3
6	Evil Geniuses	2
3	FlyQuest	2
4	Team SoloMid	3
Lower round 1	Lower quarterfinals	Lower semifinal	Lower final
5	Golden Guardians	2
4	Team SoloMid	3	4	Team SoloMid	3	1	Team Liquid	2
8	Dignitas	0	4	Team SoloMid	3	4	Team SoloMid	3
2	Cloud9	1
2	Cloud9	3
6	Evil Geniuses	3	6	Evil Geniuses	0
7	100 Thieves	0

==== Final standings ====
Pos	Team	Qualification
1	Team SoloMid	2020 League of Legends World Championship
2	FlyQuest	2020 League of Legends World Championship
3	Team Liquid	2020 League of Legends World Championship
4	Cloud9	
5–6	Evil Geniuses	
5–6	Golden Guardians	
7–8	100 Thieves	
7–8	Dignitas	

=== Awards ===
- 1st Team All-Pro:
  - T Licorice, Cloud9
  - J Blaber, Cloud9
  - M Bjergsen, Team SoloMid
  - B Zven, Cloud9
  - S CoreJJ, Team Liquid
- 2nd Team All-Pro:
  - T Ssumday, 100 Thieves
  - J Santorin, FlyQuest
  - M Jensen, Team Liquid
  - B Tactical, Team Liquid
  - S Vulcan, 100 Thieves
- 3rd Team All-Pro:
  - T Impact, Team Liquid
  - J Closer, Golden Guardians
  - M Nisqy, Cloud9
  - M PowerOfEvil, FlyQuest
  - B FBI, Golden Guardians
  - S IgNar, FlyQuest
- Most Valuable Player: CoreJJ, Team Liquid
- Rookie of the Year: Tactical, Team Liquid
- Coaching Staff of the Split: Team Liquid

== Broadcast ==
The English broadcast was available on the League of Legends Esports website, as well as on Twitch and YouTube. On January 20, Riot Games announced their official partnership with Chinese streaming service Huya, giving them exclusive rights to the Chinese broadcast. On April 8, it was announced that the spring playoffs would be aired on ESPN2 and the ESPN App.

For the 2020 season, the LCS implemented a revised schedule, featuring broadcasts of matches on Monday evenings called "Monday Night League" in addition to their regularly scheduled Saturday and Sunday broadcasts. In May, the league decided to discontinue Monday Night League in May 2020 due to low viewership. Instead, the league extended its broadcasts to include Friday evenings.
