= Bjergsen =

Danish League of Legends player

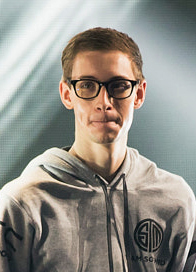
- Bjerg in 2015

Personal information
- Name: Søren Bjerg
- Born: 21 February 1996 (age 30); Denmark

Career information
- Games: League of Legends
- Playing career: 2012–2020, 2022–2023
- Role: Mid Laner
- Coaching career: 2021

Team history

As player:
- 2012: Western Wolves
- 2012: Team-LDLC
- 2012–2013: Copenhagen Wolves
- 2013: Ninjas in Pyjamas
- 2014–2020: Team SoloMid
- 2022: Team Liquid
- 2023: 100 Thieves

As coach:
- 2021: Team SoloMid

Career highlights and awards
- 6× LCS champion (4× MVP); 6× LCS All–Pro First Team; IEM champion (2015); Rift Rivals champion (2017); LCS Lock in Champion (2022)

Søren Bjerg (Danish: [ˈsɶːɐn ˈpjɛɐ̯ˀw]; born 21 February 1996), better known as Bjergsen (English: /ˈbjɜːrɡsɪn/ BYURG-sin), is a Danish former professional League of Legends player. He is best known for his 7 year career period from 2014 to 2020 as the starting mid laner for the Team SoloMid (TSM) League of Legends Championship Series (LCS) team. He followed it with shorter stints as a head coach for TSM, and again as a mid laner for Team Liquid and 100 Thieves. He is one of the most decorated North American players of all time with 6 domestic titles and 10 finals appearances, and has never finished below 5th place. Internationally, he won IEM Katowice 2015 and qualified for the League of Legends World Championship 5 times, only advancing past the group stage once. He is often regarded as the greatest North American League of Legends Championship Series player for his individual prowess as a mid laner, being a perennial MVP, 1st Team All Pro candidate, winning 4 MVP titles, 3 playoff MVP titles, and six First-Team All-Pro titles. Bjerg has never finished below 4th in All-Pro voting, and as of 2024 is the current all-time LCS kills leader. Bjerg retired from competitive eSports in April 2023.

== Early life ==
Bjerg was born on 21 February 1996, in Denmark. He grew up in Mejdal, Holstebro with his two brothers. Prior to League of Legends, Bjerg played several games casually, including Counter Strike Global Offensive, World of Warcraft, Hearthstone, and Diablo 2.

== Career ==
=== Copenhagen Wolves / Ninjas in Pyjamas (2013) ===
Bjerg joined professional League of Legends in 2013 as a member of the Copenhagen Wolves in the European League of Legends Championship Series. Due to age restrictions put in place by Riot Games, Bjerg was unable to play with the Copenhagen Wolves until Week 3. For the first two weeks, he was temporarily replaced by the team's substitute player, cowTard. After he turned 17 years old on the 21 February he joined the main lineup and played the remaining matches. After finding success with CW, his team was acquired by and re-branded as Ninjas in Pyjamas (NiP) for the Summer Split of the EU LCS.

=== Team SoloMid (2014–2020) ===
On 2 November 2013, Bjerg left NiP to move to North America and joined TSM as their mid laner. He was the second player to cross over from the EU to NA LCS, after Edward left Gambit Gaming to join Team Curse during Season 3. On 23 January 2014, Riot Games announced that Bjerg violated the LCS rules by approaching and encouraging a contracted LCS player to leave his position at Lemondogs. He admitted the violation and was fined $2,000. In the Spring Split, Bjerg and TSM finished second place in the regular season with a 22–6 record, and Bjergsen won the MVP award in his first split in North America. They were placed into the semi-finals, where they defeated Counter Logic Gaming 2–0 before falling 3–0 to Cloud9 in the finals. In the Summer Split, TSM ended at 16–12, which was enough for a third place seeding in the playoffs. TSM faced Dignitas in the first round, and won 3–1, before defeating LMQ in a close 3–2 series to make their fourth consecutive finals appearance, and their third against Cloud9. TSM beat the reigning champions, where Bjerg won his first LCS Championship.

In the 2015 Spring Split, Bjerg won the MVP Award again, leading his team to a 13–5 record, which was first place in the league. In playoffs, TSM defeated Team Impulse 3–1 in the Semifinals, before again meeting Cloud9 in the title match. TSM defeated Cloud9 3–1, and won their third LCS title, and Bjerg's second. In the Summer Split, TSM finished 5th, with a record of 11–7, but again the finals, defeating Gravity Gaming and Team Liquid both with a score of 3–1. In the finals, they faced Counter Logic Gaming, and were swept 3–0. Despite losing the Summer Finals, TSM still qualified for the 2015 League of Legends World Championship. At Worlds, TSM were drawn into Group D, alongside Korea's KT Rolster, Europe's Origen, and China's LGD Gaming. TSM came last in their group with a record of 1–5, eliminating them in the group stage.

In 2016, TSM started the Spring Split slow, ending in sixth place, with a 9–9 record, just qualifying for playoffs. However once the knockout stage arrived, TSM defeated Cloud9 and Immortals, 3–1, and 3–0 respectively, to face Counter Logic Gaming in a rematch of last year. Once again, TSM was defeated, this time with a score of 3–2. In the Summer Split, TSM finished with a record of 17–1, losing only a single game to Immortals, where Bjerg won his third MVP. The team faced Counter Logic Gaming in the playoffs once again, but this time in the Semifinals, where TSM beat them 3–0 in the series and went on to face Cloud9 in the finals, where they won 3–1. Bjerg therefore earned his third World Championship appearance as North America's first seed. At the competition, TSM was drawn into group D, with Korea's Samsung Galaxy, China's Royal Never Give Up, and Europe's Splyce. They finished third in their group with a 3–3 record, and were once again eliminated in the Group stage.

For the 2017 season, TSM finished the Spring Split with a record of 15–3 as the second seed. Bjerg was awarded First Team All–Pro. In playoffs, TSM defeated FlyQuest 3–0 before facing Cloud9 in the finals. TSM won 3–2, and qualified for the 2017 Mid–Season Invitational. At MSI, TSM finished with a 4–6 record, placing fifth out of six teams. For the Summer Split, Bjerg and TSM once again finished first in the regular season, with a 14–4 record. Bjerg was awarded his fourth MVP, and in playoffs, TSM defeated Dignitas 3–1 before facing Immortals in the finals. TSM won 3–1 and once again earned the first seed for the 2017 World Championships. TSM were placed into Group D, alongside China's Team WE, Europe's Misfits and Taiwan's Flash Wolves. TSM were unable to advance, going 3–3 to finish third.

In the 2018 Spring Split, TSM achieved an 11–7 record in the regular season, seeding third for playoffs. Bjerg was voted First Team All-Pro, but in playoffs, TSM were upset by the sixth seed, Clutch Gaming and for the first time in their history, TSM were eliminated before the finals. For the Summer Split TSM finished fifth with a 10–8 record, and faced Echo Fox in the quarterfinals, where they won 3–1, before losing to Cloud9 in the semifinals. Due to their fifth and third place finishes, respectively, TSM did not automatically qualify for Worlds 2018 and were instead placed into the Regional Gauntlet as the 2nd seed, with the winner claiming the third and final spot representing North America. In a rematch with Echo Fox, TSM swept the series 3–0, before being defeated and eliminated by Cloud9. For the first time in his LCS career, Bjerg did not attend the World Championship.

After the 2018 season, TSM went 13–5 in the 2019 Spring Split, which gave them enough for third place. Bjerg took home another First Team All-Pro, and in playoffs they defeated Echo Fox 3–1, and reverse swept Cloud9 3–2 to return to the finals vs Team Liquid, where they were, in turn, reverse swept. In the Summer Split, TSM finished fifth, with a 10–8 record, but lost their first playoff game 3–1 to Clutch. Once again, the Regional Gauntlet was the team's last chance to save their season, but TSM was defeated 3–2 by Clutch gaming, and for the second straight year, Bjerg and TSM failed to qualify for the World Championship.

In the Spring Split, TSM began their season by going 9–9, and in playoffs, defeated 100 Thieves 3–2 before falling to FlyQuest 2–3 and were once again eliminated early. In the Summer Split however, they finished fourth with 12–6, and Bjerg again took home All Pro Honors, being voted to the First-Team. TSM faced Golden Guardians in the first round, and swept 3–0. However due to the new format, they were given another change in the losers bracket. There, TSM went on a run, defeating Dignitas, Golden Guardians, Cloud9, Team Liquid, and finally FlyQuest to win the 2020 Summer Split. Bjerg claimed his 6th LCS Championship Title, tying him for second all time, and earning TSM a spot at Worlds, however they failed to win a single game, going 0–6 and finishing last among all teams in the group stage.

=== Team Liquid and 100 Thieves (2022–2023) ===
In September 2021, Bjerg announced a desire to resume a player role, and a one month later, he rejected a contract renewal offer from TSM, and announced he would be leaving the team. On 24 November 2021, Bjerg joined Team Liquid.

Bjerg made his debut with his new team in the 2022 Lock–In, which Team Liquid won, defeating Evil Geniuses 3–0. Bjerg earned player of the series in the final match. Despite having a roster of superstars, Team Liquid failed to make the finals of either split in the 2022 LCS season and the team was disbanded after that season. Bjerg joined 100 Thieves for the 2023 LCS season, reuniting with former TSM teammate Doublelift. After being upset early in the playoffs of the 2023 Spring split by Golden Guardians, Bjerg announced his retirement from League of Legends on 8 April 2023.

== Coaching career ==
In October 2020, after a seven-year career with TSM, Bjerg retired from professional play and transitioned to the head coach position for TSM. Bjerg dismissed speculation that his retirement was prompted by TSM's disappointing performance at the 2020 Worlds, saying that he had been planning it for some time. On November 21, TSM signed Tristan "PowerOfEvil" Schrage from FlyQuest to replace Bjerg in the midlane. This new TSM squad, with Bjerg as their coach, finished second in the Spring Split and first in the Summer Split, but despite regular season success, TSM did not succeed in playoffs, and placed fifth in Lock-In, third in the Mid-Season Showdown, and fourth in the Summer Split, losing to Cloud9, Team Liquid, and Cloud9, respectively. As a result, Bjerg's team did not attend Worlds.

== Seasons overview ==
Team	Year	Domestic			Mid-Season Invitational	World Championship
Team	Year	League	Spring	Summer	Mid-Season Invitational	World Championship
Copenhagen Wolves	2013	EU LCS	5th–6th	—N/a	—N/a	—N/a
Ninjas in Pyjamas	2013	EU LCS	—N/a	6th	—N/a	Did not qualify
Team SoloMid	2014	NA LCS	2nd	1st	—N/a	5th–8th
Team SoloMid	2015	NA LCS	1st	2nd	5th	14th–16th
Team SoloMid	2016	NA LCS	2nd	1st	Did not qualify	9th–12th
Team SoloMid	2017	NA LCS	1st	1st	5th	9th–11th
Team SoloMid	2018	NA LCS	5th–6th	3rd	Did not qualify	Did not qualify
Team SoloMid	2019	LCS	2nd	5th–6th	Did not qualify	Did not qualify
Team SoloMid	2020	LCS	4th	1st	None held (Note: Cancelled due to the COVID-19 pandemic.)	13th–16th
Team Liquid	2022	LCS	3rd	4th	Did not qualify	Did not qualify
100 Thieves	2023	LCS	5th–6th	—N/a	Did not qualify	—N/a

== Awards and nominations ==
Year	Ceremony	Category	Result	Ref.
2018	Forbes 30 Under 30	Games	Included	
