= 2017 Mid-Season Invitational =

League of Legends tournament

Tournament information
- Sport: League of Legends
- Location: Brazil
- Dates: 28 April–21 May
- Administrator: Riot Games
- Venue(s): CBLOL Studio (São Paulo, Play-in stage); Jeunesse Arena (Rio de Janeiro, Main Event)
- Teams: 13

Final positions
- Champions: SK Telecom T1
- Runner-up: G2 Esports
- MVP: Lee "Wolf" Jae-wan (SK Telecom T1)

The 2017 Mid-Season Invitational was the third annual League of Legends Mid-Season Invitational (MSI) tournament, hosted by Riot Games. The tournament was held from April 28 to May 21, 2017, in Brazil. This was the first time MSI had been extended. Each of 13 premier League of Legends leagues had a team that won the Spring Split represent them; Europe (EU LCS), South Korea (LCK), and China (LPL) had their teams automatically admitted into the main event whereas the other 10 leagues competed among each other in a "Play-in Stage" with the top 3 teams advancing to join the main event.

SK Telecom T1 from South Korea successfully defended their championship from the previous year, defeating G2 Esports 3–1 in the final.

== Qualified teams ==
Based on the result of the MSI and World Championship in 2 years before (2015–2016), 3 teams from Europe (EU LCS), South Korea (LCK), and China (LPL) are started in Main Group stage, 2 teams from North America (NA LCS) and Taiwan/Hong Kong/Macau (LMS) are started in Play-in round 2, and instead of the Mid-Season International Wildcard Invitational in 2015–2016, 8 teams from Wildcard regions are started in Play-in round 1.

Region	League	Team	ID
Start in Main Group stage
China	LPL	Team WE	WE
Europe	EU LCS	G2 Esports	G2
South Korea	LCK	SK Telecom T1	SKT
Start in Play-in round 2
North America	NA LCS	Team SoloMid	TSM
Taiwan/Hong Kong/Macau	LMS	Flash Wolves	FW
Start in Play-in round 1
Brazil	CBLOL	RED Canids	RED
CIS	LCL	Virtus.pro	VP
Japan	LJL	Rampage	RPG
Latin America North	LLN	Lyon Gaming	LYN
Latin America South	CLS	Isurus Gaming	ISG
Oceania	OPL	Dire Wolves	DW
Vietnam►Southeast Asia	VCS►GPL	GIGABYTE Marines	GAM
Turkey	TCL	SuperMassive eSports	SUP

== Venues ==
São Paulo and Rio de Janeiro were the two cities chosen to host the competition.

Brazil
São Paulo	Rio de Janeiro
Play-in Stage	Main Event
CBLoL Studio	Jeunesse Arena
Capacity:	Capacity: 15,430
2017 Mid-Season Invitational is located in Brazil

== Play-In Stage ==
=== Groups ===
First place teams of each group advance to round 2 of the stage

Group A

Pos	Team	Pld	W	L	PCT	Qualification
1	SuperMassive eSports	6	5	1	0.833	Advance to Play-In Knockouts
2	Red Canids Corinthians	6	4	2	0.667	
3	Dire Wolves	6	2	4	0.333	
4	Rampage	6	1	5	0.167	

Source: LoL Esports (Archived 2017-05-21 at the Wayback Machine)

Group B

Pos	Team	Pld	W	L	PCT	Qualification
1	GIGABYTE Marines	6	5	1	0.833	Advance to Play-In Knockouts
2	Lyon Gaming	6	4	2	0.667	
3	Virtus.pro	6	2	4	0.333	
4	Isurus Gaming	6	1	5	0.167	

Source: LoL Esports (Archived 2017-05-21 at the Wayback Machine)

=== Knockouts ===
Winners of the series advance to group stage. Losers drops to round 3.

GIGABYTE Marines advance to group stage by beating SuperMassive eSports 3–1. GPL of Southeast Asia gets directly spot in Main Group Stage for Summer Split winner and additional spot in Play-in Stage for Summer Split Runner-up at 2017 World Championship.

Round 2
Winner to Group Stage
Team SoloMid	3
GIGABYTE Marines	2
Winner to Group Stage
Flash Wolves	3
SuperMassive eSports	0

Round 3
Winner to Group Stage
GIGABYTE Marines	3
SuperMassive eSports	1

== Group stage ==
Pos	Team	Pld	W	L	PCT	Qualification
1	SK Telecom T1	10	8	2	0.800	Advance to Knockout Stage
2	Team WE	10	7	3	0.700	Advance to Knockout Stage
3	G2 Esports (Note: After the group stage G2 Esports was in a three way tie with Team SoloMid and Flash Wolves. The tiebreaker procedure put G2 Esports in third place as they had the best combined record (3–1) against the other two teams.)	10	4	6	0.400	Advance to Knockout Stage
4	Flash Wolves	11	5	6	0.455	Advance to Knockout Stage
5	Team SoloMid	11	4	7	0.364	
6	GIGABYTE Marines	10	3	7	0.300	

Source: LoL Esports (Archived 2017-05-21 at the Wayback Machine)

== Knockout stage ==
- The 1st-place team plays with the 4th-place team, The 2nd-place team plays with the 3rd-place team in semifinals.
- All matches are Best-of-five.

Semifinals
May 19
SK Telecom T1	3
Flash Wolves	0
May 20
Team WE	1
G2 Esports	3

Final
May 21
SK Telecom T1	3
G2 Esports	1

== Ranking ==
Place	League	Teams	PS1	PS2	PS3	GS	SF	Final
1st	LCK	SK Telecom T1				8–2	3–0	3–1
2nd	EU LCS	G2 Esports				4–6	3–1	1–3
3rd–4th	LPL	Team WE				7–3	1–3	
3rd–4th	LMS	Flash Wolves		3–1		4–6	0–3	
5th	NA LCS	Team SoloMid		3–2		4–6		
6th	VCS►GPL	GIGABYTE Marines	5–1	2–3	3–1	3–7		
7th	TCL	SuperMassive e-Sports	5–1	0–3	1–3			
8–9th	CBLOL	RED Canids	4–2					
8–9th	LLN	Lyon Gaming	4–2					
10–11th	LCL	Virtus.pro	2–4					
10–11th	OPL	Dire Wolves	2–4					
12–13th	LJL	Rampage	1–5					
12–13th	CLS	Isurus Gaming	1–5					
