= Smoothie (gamer) =

Canadian professional League of Legends player

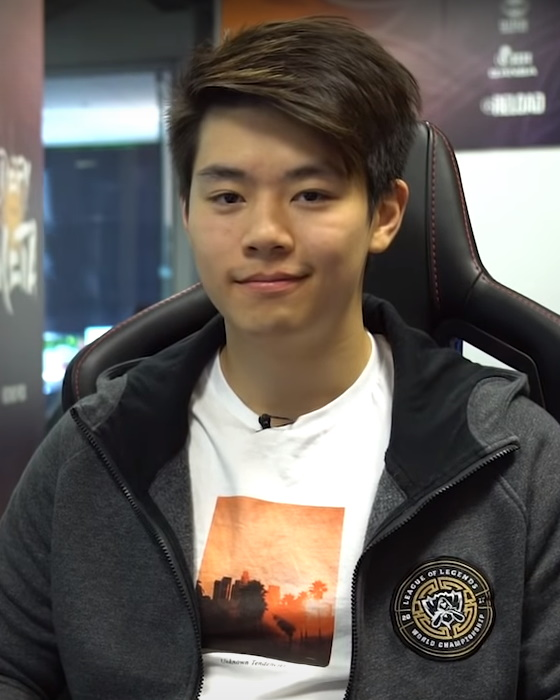
- Ta in 2018

Personal information
- Name: Andy Ta
- Born: 1996 or 1997 (age 29–30); Toronto, Canada
- Nationality: Canadian

Current team
- Team: Counter Logic Gaming
- Role: Support
- Game: League of Legends
- League: LCS

Career information
- Playing career: 2015–present

Team history
- 2015: Team Dragon Knights
- 2015–2016: Team Liquid
- 2016: Team Liquid Academy
- 2016–2018: Cloud9
- 2018: Cloud9 Academy
- 2018: Echo Fox
- 2018–2019: Team SoloMid
- 2019–2021: Counter Logic Gaming

Andy Ta, better known by his in-game name Smoothie, is a Canadian professional League of Legends player who was formerly the support for League of Legends Championship Series team Counter Logic Gaming. He has also played for Team Dragon Knights, Team Liquid, Cloud9, Echo Fox and Team SoloMid.

== Career ==
Ta joined Team Liquid in October 2015, and the team announced the acquisition by posting a YouTube video with the team drinking smoothies. He later joined Cloud9 in June 2016, along with Johnny "Altec" Ru.

== Tournament results ==
- 3rd — 2016 Spring NA LCS
- 5th–6th — 2016 Spring NA LCS playoffs
- 3rd — 2016 Summer NA LCS
- 2nd — 2016 Summer NA LCS playoffs
- 1st — 2016 NA LCS Regional Finals
- 5th-8th 2016 League of Legends World Championship
- 2nd — 2017 Spring NA LCS
- 2nd — 2017 Spring NA LCS playoffs
- 4th — 2017 Summer NA LCS
- 5th–6th — 2017 Summer NA LCS playoffs
- 1st — 2017 NA LCS Regional Finals
- 5th-8th 2017 League of Legends World Championship
