= Gravity Gaming =

- Nicknames: Team Gravity
- Short name: Gravity, GV
- Sport: League of Legends
- Founded: 2013 (as Curse Academy); 2015 (as Gravity)
- League: NA LCS
- Team history: Curse Academy (2013–2015)
- Based in: San Dimas, California
- Arena: NA LCS Studio
- Owner: Davis Vague

Gravity Gaming (also known as Team Gravity) was a North American League of Legends team that competed in the North American League of Legends Championship Series (LCS). The team was originally known as Curse Academy and was the second team of Team Curse. Upon qualifying for the LCS the team was required by league rules to rebrand. The team is based in San Dimas, California and plays games in the NA LCS Studio in Sawtelle, Los Angeles. The Gravity LCS spot was sold in December 2015 to former NBA player Rick Fox, who then rebranded the team as Echo Fox.

== History ==
=== 2015 Preseason ===
Curse Academy defeated Team Coast and the Team Fusion to qualify for the 2015 Spring LCS. Gravity was spun-off from team Curse in 2015. Due to Sale of Sponsorship rule changes for the 2015 Season, the Curse brand was required to be pulled from the team that represented them; however, Gravity inherited the LCS spot that Curse Academy had acquired via the Expansion Tournament. Gravity's initial starting roster included Hauntzer, Saintvicious, Keane, Cop, and Bunny FuFuu.

=== 2015 season ===
After the third week of the Spring Season, Gravity's coach SoulDra left the team. On May 25 in a match against TSM Keane picked Urgot, a champion who had been considerably nerfed. Two weeks later, he was replaced by LS Gravity's record after LS joined the team was 6–4, bringing their overall record to 10-8 and earning fifth place along with a playoff spot. In the quarterfinals, Gravity fell 1–3 to Team Impulse, earning 10 Championship Points for the season. After the split ended, veteran player Saintvicious retired from playing and left to become the coach for Team Coast. He was replaced by Move, a Korean jungler who had previously played for AD Gaming. Additionally Altec joined from the recently relegated Winterfox, replacing Cop. Cop retired from playing and became a coach for the team.

In the summer split, Gravity finished each week in at worst fourth position, even holding sole possession of first place for weeks 7 and 8; however, they lost both of their games in the final week and ended the season in fourth, after a tiebreaker loss to Team Impulse. In the playoff quarterfinals, Gravity lost to Team SoloMid, leaving them with a year-long total of 30 Championship Points, and qualifying for the regional finals in fifth place. They lost immediately in the gauntlet, reverse swept by first-round opponent Cloud9, who went on to qualify to the 2015 League of Legends World Championship.

The team was sold in December 2015 for around US$1 million to a yet-to-be announced owner. On December 18, 2015, it was announced that the actor and retired NBA player Rick Fox had purchased professional Gravity Gaming for around US$1 million and renamed the team Echo Fox.

== Final roster ==
Nat.	ID	Name	Role
(United States)	Hauntzer	Kevin Yarnell	Top Laner
(South Korea)	Move	Kang Min-su	Jungler
(South Korea)	Keane	Jang Lae-young	Mid Laner
(Canada)	Altec	Johnny Ru	Bot Laner
(United States)	Bunny Fu Fuu	Michael Kurylo	Support
