= 2014 NA LCS season =

- League: NA LCS
- Sport: League of Legends
- Duration: January 16 – April 20 (Spring); May 23 – September 1 (Summer)
- Teams: 8
- TV partner: Twitch

Spring
- Champions: Cloud9
- Runners-up: Team SoloMid
- Top seed: Cloud9
- Season MVP: Søren "Bjergsen" Bjerg (TSM)

Summer
- Champions: Team SoloMid
- Runners-up: Cloud9
- Top seed: Cloud9
- Season MVP: Yu "XiaoWeiXiao" Xian (LMQ)

NA LCS seasons
- ← 2013 2015 →

The 2014 NA LCS season was the second year of the North American League of Legends Championship Series. It was divided into spring and summer splits, each consisting of a regular season and playoff stage. The top six teams from the regular season advanced to the playoff stage, with the top two teams receiving a bye to the semifinals. Regular season games were played in Riot Games' studio in Sawtelle, Los Angeles.

The spring split began on January 16 and concluded on April 20 with the spring finals, which Cloud9 won with the same roster from the previous split: Balls, Meteos, Hai, Sneaky and LemonNation.

The summer split began on May 23 and concluded with Team SoloMid winning their second NA LCS title on September 1, with a roster consisting of Dyrus, Amazing, Bjergsen, WildTurtle and Lustboy. The summer split also saw the introduction of Riot Games' official fantasy league, the Fantasy LCS.

Team SoloMid, Cloud9 and LMQ qualified for the 2014 World Championship by placing first, second and third respectively in the summer playoffs.

== Spring ==
=== Regular season ===
Pos	Team	Pld	W	L	PCT	Qualification or relegation
1	Cloud9	28	24	4	.857	Advance to semifinals
2	Team SoloMid	28	22	6	.786	Advance to semifinals
3	Counter Logic Gaming	28	18	10	.643	Advance to quarterfinals
4	Team Dignitas	28	12	16	.429	Advance to quarterfinals
5	Curse Gaming	28	11	17	.393	Advance to quarterfinals
6	Team Coast	28	10	18	.357	Advance to quarterfinals
7	Evil Geniuses	28	8	20	.286	Promotion tournament
8	XDG Gaming	28	7	21	.250	Promotion tournament

Source: LoL Esports (Archived December 6, 2014, at the Wayback Machine)
Rules for classification: 1) Winning percentage; 2) head-to-head record; 3) tiebreaker match(es)

=== Playoffs ===
==== Bracket ====
Quarterfinals
4	Team Dignitas	1
5	Team Curse	2
3	Counter Logic Gaming	2
6	Team Coast	0

Semifinals
1	Cloud9	2
5	Team Curse	0
2	Team SoloMid	2
3	Counter Logic Gaming	1
Fifth place
4	Team Dignitas	2
6	Team Coast	1

Final
1	Cloud9	3
2	Team SoloMid	0
Third place
3	Counter Logic Gaming	2
5	Team Curse	0

Source: LoL Esports (Archived September 16, 2015, at the Wayback Machine)

==== Final standings ====
Pos	Team	Qualification or relegation
1	Cloud9	2014 League of Legends All-Star
2	Team SoloMid	
3	Counter Logic Gaming	
4	Team Curse	
5	Team Dignitas	
6	Team Coast	Promotion tournament

=== Promotion tournament ===
Finals
Winner to 2014 Summer
A1	Team Coast	1
B3	CompLexity Black	3
Winner to 2014 Summer
A2	Evil Geniuses	3
B2	Cloud9 Tempest	1
Winner to 2014 Summer
A3	XDG Gaming	0
B1	LMQ	3

Source: LoL Esports (Archived September 21, 2015, at the Wayback Machine)

== Summer ==
=== Regular season ===
Pos	Team	Pld	W	L	PCT	Qualification or relegation
1	Cloud9	28	18	10	.643	Advance to semifinals
2	LMQ	28	18	10	.643	Advance to semifinals
3	Team SoloMid	28	16	12	.571	Advance to quarterfinals
4	Curse Gaming	28	13	15	.464	Advance to quarterfinals
5	Counter Logic Gaming	28	13	15	.464	Advance to quarterfinals
6	Team Dignitas	28	13	15	.464	Advance to quarterfinals
7	Evil Geniuses	28	11	17	.393	Promotion tournament
8	CompLexity Black	28	10	18	.357	Promotion tournament

Source: LoL Esports (Archived September 28, 2015, at the Wayback Machine)
Rules for classification: 1) Winning percentage; 2) head-to-head record; 3) tiebreaker match(es)

=== Playoffs ===
==== Bracket ====
Quarterfinals
4	Team Curse	3
5	Counter Logic Gaming	0
3	Team SoloMid	3
6	Team Dignitas	1

Semifinals
1	Cloud9	3
4	Team Curse	0
2	LMQ	2
3	Team SoloMid	3
Fifth place
5	Counter Logic Gaming	1
6	Team Dignitas	3

Final
1	Cloud9	2
3	Team SoloMid	3
Third place
4	Team Curse	2
2	LMQ	3

Source: LoL Esports (Archived September 12, 2015, at the Wayback Machine)

==== Final standings ====
Pos	Team	Qualification or relegation
1	Team SoloMid	2014 League of Legends World Championship
2	Cloud9	2014 League of Legends World Championship
3	LMQ	2014 League of Legends World Championship
4	Team Curse	
5	Team Dignitas	
6	Counter Logic Gaming	Promotion tournament

=== Promotion tournament ===
Finals
Winner to 2015 Spring
A1	Counter Logic Gaming	3
B3	Curse Academy	2
Winner to 2015 Spring
A2	Evil Geniuses	3
B2	Team Coast	0
Winner to 2015 Spring
A3	CompLexity Black	2
B1	Team 8	3

Source: LoL Esports (Archived September 16, 2015, at the Wayback Machine)
