= 2013 NA LCS season =

- League: NA LCS
- Sport: League of Legends
- Duration: February 7 – April 28 (Spring); June 12 – September 1 (Summer)
- Teams: 8
- TV partner: Twitch

Spring
- Champions: Team SoloMid
- Runners-up: Good Game University
- Top seed: Team SoloMid

Summer
- Champions: Cloud9
- Runners-up: Team SoloMid
- Top seed: Cloud9

NA LCS seasons
- 2014 →

The 2013 NA LCS season was the first year of the North American League of Legends Championship Series. It was divided into spring and summer splits, each consisting of a regular season and playoff stage. The top six teams from the regular season advanced to the playoff stage, with the top two teams receiving a bye to the semifinals. Regular season games were played in a film studio in Sawtelle, Los Angeles, California.

The spring split began on February 7 and concluded with the spring finals on April 28. Both the regular season and playoffs were won by Team SoloMid with a roster consisting of Dyrus, TheOddOne, Reginald, WildTurtle, and Xpecial.

The summer regular season and playoffs were both won by Cloud9 in their debut split, with a roster consisting of Balls, Meteos, Hai, Sneaky and LemonNation. Cloud9 also set a historic regular season finish of 25–3, a record which stood until PAX 2013.

Cloud9, TeamSoloMid and Team Vulcun qualified for the Season 3 World Championship by placing first, second and third respectively in the summer playoffs.

== Spring ==
=== Regular season ===
Pos	Team	Pld	W	L	PCT	Qualification or relegation
1	Team SoloMid	28	21	7	.750	Advance to semifinals
2	Curse Gaming	28	19	9	.679	Advance to semifinals
3	Team Dignitas	28	17	11	.607	Advance to quarterfinals
4	Counter Logic Gaming	28	13	15	.464	Advance to quarterfinals
5	Team Vulcun	28	12	16	.429	Advance to quarterfinals
6	Good Game University	28	11	17	.393	Advance to quarterfinals
7	Team MRN	28	10	18	.357	Promotion tournament
8	CompLexity White	28	9	19	.321	Promotion tournament

Source: LoL Esports (Archived September 5, 2015, at the Wayback Machine)
Rules for classification: 1) Winning percentage; 2) head-to-head record; 3) tiebreaker match(es)

=== Playoffs ===
==== Bracket ====
Quarterfinals
4	Counter Logic Gaming	1
5	Team Vulcan	2
3	Team Dignitas	1
6	Good Game University	2

Semifinals
1	Team SoloMid	2
5	Team Vulcan	1
2	Team Curse	1
6	Good Game University	2

Final
1	Team SoloMid	3
6	Good Game University	2
Third place
2	Team Curse	1
5	Team Vulcun	2

Source: LoL Esports (Archived September 17, 2015, at the Wayback Machine)

==== Final standings ====
Pos	Team	Relegation
1	Team SoloMid	
2	Good Game University	
3	Team Vulcun	
4	Team Curse	
5–6	Counter Logic Gaming	Promotion tournament
5–6	Team Dignitas	Promotion tournament

=== Promotion tournament ===
Challenger
B4	Doublebuff	0
B5	Azure Cats	2
B3	Team Summon	2
B6	Fidelis	0
B2	Velocity Esports	2
B7	The Salad Bar	1
B1	Cloud9	2
B8	Team Astral Poke	0

Promotion
Winner to 2013 Summer
A1	Counter Logic Gaming	3
B5	Azure Cats	0
Winner to 2013 Summer
A2	Team Dignitas	3
B3	Team Summon	1
Winner to 2013 Summer
A3	Team MRN	2
B2	Velocity Esports	3
Winner to 2013 Summer
A4	CompLexity White	0
B1	Cloud9	3

Source: LoL Esports (Archived September 16, 2015, at the Wayback Machine)

== Summer ==
=== Regular season ===
Pos	Team	Pld	W	L	PCT	Qualification or relegation
1	Cloud9	28	25	3	.893	Advance to semifinals
2	Team Vulcun	28	20	8	.714	Advance to semifinals
3	Team SoloMid	28	14	14	.500	Advance to quarterfinals
4	Curse Gaming	28	13	15	.464	Advance to quarterfinals
5	Counter Logic Gaming	28	13	15	.464	Advance to quarterfinals
6	Team Dignitas	28	13	15	.464	Advance to quarterfinals
7	Team Coast	28	9	19	.321	Promotion tournament
8	Velocity Esports	28	5	23	.179	Promotion tournament

Source: LoL Esports (Archived September 16, 2015, at the Wayback Machine)
Rules for classification: 1) Winning percentage; 2) head-to-head record; 3) tiebreaker match(es)

=== Playoffs ===
==== Bracket ====
Quarterfinals
4	Team Curse	1
5	Team Dignitas	2
3	Team SoloMid	2
6	Counter Logic Gaming	0

Semifinals
1	Cloud9	2
5	Team Dignitas	0
2	Team Vulcun	0
3	Team SoloMid	2
Fifth place
4	Team Curse	0
6	Counter Logic Gaming	2

Final
1	Cloud9	3
3	Team SoloMid	0
Third place
5	Team Dignitas	0
2	Team Vulcun	2

Source: LoL Esports (Archived September 5, 2015, at the Wayback Machine)

==== Final standings ====
Pos	Team	Qualification or relegation
1	Cloud9	2013 League of Legends World Championship
2	Team SoloMid	2013 League of Legends World Championship
3	Team Vulcun	2013 League of Legends World Championship
4	Team Dignitas	
5	Counter Logic Gaming	
6	Team Curse	Promotion tournament

=== Promotion tournament ===
Promotion
Winner to 2014 Spring
A1	Team Curse	3
B3	COGnitive Gaming	1
Winner to 2014 Spring
A2	Team Coast	3
B2	The Walking Zed	0
Winner to 2014 Spring
A3	Velocity Esports	3
B1	To Be Determined	2

Source: LoL Esports (Archived September 15, 2015, at the Wayback Machine)
