= Xmithie =

Professional League of Legends player

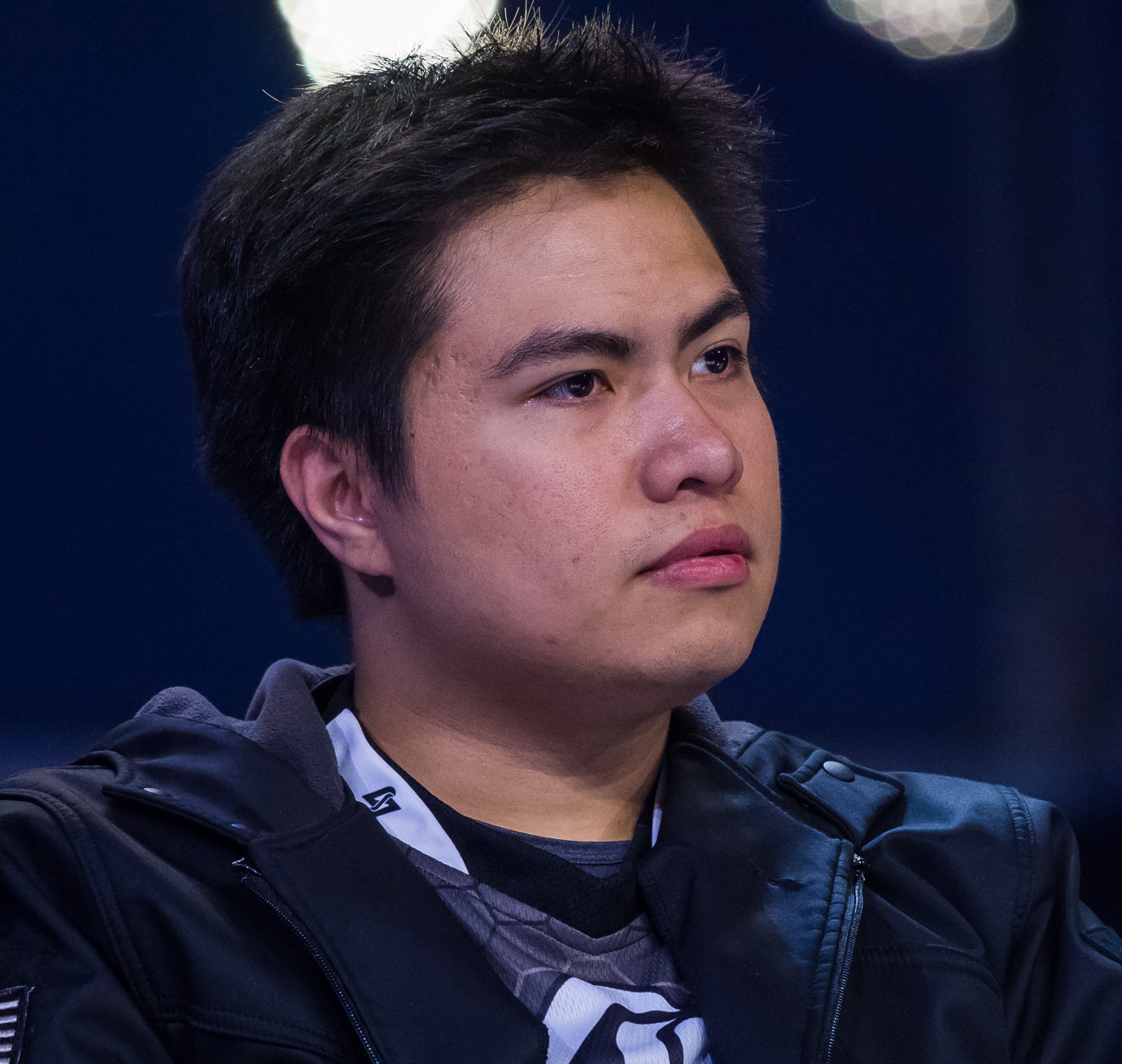
- Puchero in 2016

Personal information
- Name: Jake Puchero
- Nationality: Filipino-American

Career information
- Game: League of Legends
- Playing career: 2012–present
- Role: Jungler

Team history
- 2012: APictureOfAGoose
- 2012: mTw North America
- 2012: Monomaniac Ferus
- 2012: Team FeaR
- 2013–2014: XDG Gaming (Note: Renamed from Team Vulcan in mid-2013.)
- 2015–2017: Counter Logic Gaming
- 2017: Immortals
- 2018–2019: Team Liquid
- 2020: Immortals

Career highlights and awards
- 6× LCS champion

Jake Kevin Puchero, better known by his in-game name Xmithie (/ɛkˈsmɪθi/), is a Filipino-American professional League of Legends player most recently played as a jungler for Immortals of the League of Legends Championship Series (LCS). Xmithie won the NA LCS' 2015 Summer Split and the 2016 Spring Split while on CLG, as well as the 2018 Spring and Summer and 2019 Spring and Summer Splits while on Team Liquid.

== Career ==
=== Season 1 ===
Xmithie first entered the League of Legends in January 2011, quickly hitting level 30 and jumping into ranked duo queue, playing with his now ex-girlfriend. For a time during Season 1, Xmithie got stuck and hovered around the 1700 ELO range. However, once he began play solo in ranked, he sprang up to 2200 ELO, where he met other 2000 ELO players to form a team called Soldier Front. Team Soldier Front competed in small tournaments, eventually meeting APictureOfAGoose during a Go4LoL cup in October 2011. After playing against Team Soldier Front, A PictureOfAGoose invited Xmithie to join as their AD Carry substitute player, a position which he accepted.

=== Season 2 ===
As being a part of one of the teams that qualified through the North American Pre-Qualifier #1 for the IEM Season VI - Global Challenge Kiev, Xmithie planned to go with APictureOfAGoose to the event. But, due to family problems, LemonGoD was unable to attend the event. As a replacement, team captain Atlanta invited his friend cuRtoKy to join as the support player for APictureOfAGoose. Atlanta decided to change to the AD Carry position in order to play with cuRtoKy, since they were close friends and Atlanta believed he would synergize better with cuRtoKy more than Xmithie would. Xmithie took Atlanta's old position of jungler for the team. Despite the roster changes, APictureOfAGoose ended up not attending IEM Kiev.

Around one month after the departure of LemonGoD and the addition of Xmithie into the main lineup, APictureOfAGoose was acquired by mTw and became mTw.NA. This occurred while APictureOfAGoose was competing in the Alienware Arena North America: Winter, where they ended up placing third.

In the next few months, Xmithie found success with mTw.NA in various minor tournaments, taking first place in Go4LoL Cup #61, CSN playLEGENDS Points Cup 1, CSN playLEGENDS Points Cup 2, CSN playLEGENDS Points Cup 4, and the In2LOL Kickoff NA Tournament.

The first major tournament that Xmithie competed in under the mTw.NA banner was the 2012 MLG Pro Circuit - Spring Championship. At the event, Xmithie faced off in their first match against European powerhouse Counter Logic Gaming EU, who proved to be a tough opponent as CLG EU pulled out a 2–0 victory over mTw.NA. Dropping down to the loser's bracket, Xmithie and his team were able to take out vVv Gaming 2–1 to advance to the next round of the loser's bracket. But here mTw.NA fell to Team Dynamic 2–0, ending the tournament with 9th-12th-place finish.

Despite a disappointing showing at the MLG Spring Championship, Xmithie and mTw.NA continued to dominate the online tournament scene, taking first at the Solomid NA Invitational 3. Here, Xmithie and his team fell to Team Dynamic 0–2 in their first match of the tournament, dropping down to the loser's bracket of the third SoloMid Invitational. However, here Xmithie and mTw went on a hot streak, sweeping Lzuruha Gaming, Ordinance Gaming, and Team SoloMid 2–0 to advance to the loser's bracket final. There, mTw.NA continued forward with their momentum in tow, taking out Counter Logic Gaming Black 2–1, qualifying straight to the grand finals as Curse Gaming forfeited their remaining matches. Coming back up from the loser's bracket to face off against the team that put them there, Xmithie and mTw.NA came out on top in a close 2–1 victory in the first set and swept Team Dynamic 2–0 in the second set to take home first place from the tournament.

Continuing their success in online tournaments, Xmithie took first place on July 6, 2012, at the National ESL Pro Series Season 3 with his team mTw.NA. During the three-month-long online group stage, mTw.NA placed third, going 4-3 winning 9 games out of 16 by defeating 4Nothing 2–0, Epik Gamer 2–0, Counter Logic Gaming Prime 2–0, and Team Legion 2–0, while falling to Team Dignitas 1–2, Curse Gaming 0–2, and Team SoloMid 0–2. As Team SoloMid was forced to forfeit, mTw moved on up to the grand finals. There, Xmithie carried on the momentum and defeated Team Dignitas 2–0, taking home first place with his team mTw.NA.

Two days later, Xmithie took second place at the fourth SoloMid NA Invitational with team mTw.NA. Xmithie had a powerful start in the first two rounds, eliminating both Curse Gaming and Team Legion 2–1 to advance to the winners bracket final. But there Xmithie's team mTw.NA were unable to pull out a win, falling just short to Orbit Gaming 1–2. Not letting the loss get to them, Xmithie and mTw.NA were able to sweep heavy favorite Team SoloMid 2–0 to get another shot at first place. However, once again Orbit Gaming was able to pull out on top, taking mTw out in a close 2–1.

Xmithie participated in the Leaguecraft ggClassic Presented by Arqade with his team mTw.NA. In the group stages, his team pulled out an impressive 4-1 finish, taking second place, defeating 4Nothing, Orbit Gaming, Taipei Assassins, and Counter Logic Gaming Prime while taking their only loss to Counter Logic Gaming Black. In the playoffs mTw.NA fell to Team Dynamic 1–2, dropping down to the loser's bracket. There, mTw.NA took out Curse Gaming 2–0 to move forward to the second round of the loser's bracket. Once again, CLG Black took out mTw.NA 2–0, leaving Xmithie with a third-place finish.

A week after the top three performance at the Leaguecraft ggClassic, Xmithie competed in the SoloMid NA Invitational 5 alongside mTw.NA. Xmithie's team mTw.NA took out CLG Black 2–1 in the first round, but fell to Team SoloMid 0–2 in the second round, falling to the loser's bracket. There, mTw.NA went on a hot streak, taking out Team Dynamic, Ordinance Gaming, and Team SoloMid to reach the grand finals of the event. But mTw.NA fell to Team Dignitas 1–2 in the finals, taking home second place.

At the sixth Solomid NA Invitational, Xmithie took second place with his team mTw.NA. In the tournament, mTw.NA had a dominant first two rounds, taking out Meat Playground and Ordinance Gaming 2–0 to advance to the winner's bracket final. Here they fell to Team SoloMid 1–2, dropping down to face Ordinance Gaming once again for a shot at the grand finals. Repeating their success, mTw.NA once again swept Ordinance Gaming 2–0, advancing to the grand finals to get a rematch with Team SoloMid. Xmithie and mTw.NA had a strong first set, taking out the North American powerhouse 2–0. However, in the second set Team SoloMid rebounded and took out mTw.NA 2–0, leaving Xmithie with a second-place finish.

=== Season 5 ===
At the start of Season 5 Xmithie was picked up by CLG for the 2015 LCS Season, replacing Dexter. In the Spring Split CLG finished 3rd in regular season and 5th/6th in playoffs after losing to Team Liquid 0–3. Xmithie was OP Player once in Week 2. In the Summer Split CLG finished in second after losing to Team Liquid in a tiebreaker. This still earned them a bye in the playoffs, where they played Team Impulse and won 3–0, sending them to the finals against longtime rivals TSM. After another 3–0 victory against TSM, CLG qualified for the 2015 World Championship. On September 11 CLG announced that Xmithie was having visa issues and that HuHi would be their starting jungler for the 2015 League of Legends World Championship.

He became a naturalized US citizen in May 2015.

=== Season 7 ===
In May 2017, before start of the Summer Split of Season 7, Xmithie transferred from CLG to Immortals. He attended the Season 7 World Championships with Immortals, but the team did not continue past the Group Stage.

=== Season 8 ===
Following the announcement that Immortals would not be included in the franchising of the NALCS, Team Liquid announced that Xmithie would be a starter on the team in the 2018 Spring Split on November 22, 2017, along with other Immortals members Olleh and Pobelter. They would become the spring split champions, defeating 100 Thieves 3–0, with Xmithie providing a crucial play in Game 1 by stealing the Baron Nashor from 100 Thieves to help turn the tide in Team Liquid's favor.

During summer split, Team Liquid finished in first place during the regular season and defeated Cloud 9 3–0 in the playoff finals to win the split and ensure their spot at worlds for the first time in Team Liquid's history. However, at worlds they would fail to advance past the group stage, falling to KT Rolster and EDward Gaming.

== Tournament results ==
Career Tournament Results
Date	Event	Placing	Team	Record	Opponent
April 28, 2013	2013 NA LCS Spring Playoffs	(bronze) 3rd	Team Vulcun	2-1	Team Curse
September 1, 2013	2013 NA LCS Summer Playoffs	(bronze) 3rd	Team Vulcun	2-0	Team Dignitas
January 24–March 29, 2015	2015 NA LCS Spring Regular Season	(bronze) 3rd	Counter Logic Gaming	12-6	N/A
April 4, 2015	2015 NA LCS Spring Playoffs	5th-6th	Counter Logic Gaming	0-3	Team Liquid
May 30–July 26, 2015	2015 NA LCS Summer Regular Season	(silver) 2nd	Counter Logic Gaming	13-5	N/A
August 23, 2015	2015 NA LCS Summer Playoffs	(gold) 1st	Counter Logic Gaming	3-0	Team SoloMid
January 16–March 20, 2016	2016 NA LCS Spring Regular Season	(silver) 2nd	Counter Logic Gaming	13-5	N/A
April 17, 2016	2016 NA LCS Spring Playoffs	(gold) 1st	Counter Logic Gaming	3-2	Team SoloMid
May 15, 2016	2016 Mid-Season Invitational	(silver) 2nd	Counter Logic Gaming	0-3	SKT T1
June 3–July 31, 2016	2016 NA LCS Summer Regular Season	4th	Counter Logic Gaming	10-8	N/A
August 27, 2016	2016 NA LCS Summer Playoffs	4th	Counter Logic Gaming	2-3	Immortals
September 30–October 10, 2016	2016 League of Legends World Championship Group Stage	9-12	Counter Logic Gaming	3-3	ROX Tigers, Albus NoX Luna, and G2 Esports
January 20–March 26, 2017	2017 NA LCS Spring Regular Season	4th	Counter Logic Gaming	10-8	N/A
April 9, 2017	2017 NA LCS Spring Playoffs	5th-6th	Counter Logic Gaming	2-3	FlyQuest
June 2–August 6, 2017	2017 NA LCS Summer Regular Season	(silver) 2nd	Immortals	14-4	N/A
September 3, 2017	2017 NA LCS Summer Playoffs	(silver) 2nd	Immortals	1-3	Team SoloMid
October 5–15, 2017	2017 League of Legends World Championship Group Stage	9th-12th	Immortals	2-5	Longzhu Gaming, Fnatic, and GIGABYTE Marines
January 20–March 18, 2018	2018 NA LCS Spring Regular Season	4th	Team Liquid	12-8	N/A
April 8, 2018	2018 NA LCS Spring Playoffs	(gold) 1st	Team Liquid	3-0	100 Thieves
