= Cloud9 League of Legends =

League Championship Series team

Cloud9
- Sport: Esports
- Founded: 2013
- League: League of Legends Championship Series
- Division: Tier 1
- Region: North America
- Team history: Cloud9; 2013–present
- Based in: Los Angeles, California
- Colors: Blue, white, black
- Owner: Jack Etienne
- Head coach: Nick "Inero" Smith, Christian "IWillDominate" Rivera, Marcus "Veigarv2" Aune
- General manager: Jonathan "Tran" Tran
- Main sponsor: Kia
- Domestic titles: 6; NA LCS Summer 2013; NA LCS Spring 2014; LCS Spring 2020; LCS 2021 Mid-Season Showdown; LCS Summer 2022; LCS Spring 2023
- Website: Official website

The League of Legends division of Cloud9 (currently known as Cloud9 Kia due to sponsorship reasons) is a gaming team based in Los Angeles, California, and competes in the League of Legends Championship Series (LCS), the top-level professional league for League of Legends in the Americas, as a franchised team in the North Conference.

Established in 2013, the League of Legends division was the founding division of Cloud9. The team was originally a player-owned team before they were acquired by Quantic Gaming that same year; weeks later, the contracts of the players were sold to Jack Etienne.

Under their founding roster of Balls, Meteos, Hai, Sneaky, and LemonNation, Cloud9 won back-to-back League Championship Series (LCS) titles in their first two years of existence by winning the 2013 NA LCS Summer Split and 2014 NA LCS Spring Split. The team claimed their third LCS title by winning the 2020 LCS Spring Split in what was generally considered one of the greatest season performances by a team in the league's history. The team's fourth LCS title came in Spring 2021 after winning the 2021 Mid-Season Showdown. Additionally, Cloud9 hold several LCS records, including the highest winning percentage in a single split (92.9%) and the longest game winning streak in a single split (18).

== History ==
Cloud9's League of Legends division traces its roots back to the disbandment of Quantic Gaming's League of Legends roster, which included Nientonsoh, Hai, Yazuki, WildTurtle, and LemonNation. Following their departure from Quantic Gaming, these five players came together to form their own team called Team NomNom. However, their initial foray into the competitive scene faced an early setback when they were eliminated during the group stage of the Season 3 North American Offline Qualifier for the League of Legends Championship Series (LCS). Azure Gaming and Team MRN proved to be formidable opponents, leading to Team NomNom's elimination. As a result, Nientonsoh and Yazuki decided to part ways with the team.

In early 2013, Team NomNom underwent a rebranding and officially became Cloud9 (C9). The team's emerged victorious at the 2013 MLG Summer Promotion Qualifiers, defeating Velocity esports in the finals. This win secured their qualification for the 2013 NA LCS Summer Promotion Qualifiers. Cloud9 was then reacquired by Quantic Gaming on April 1. The roster, consisting of Balls, Meteos, Hai, Sneaky, and LemonNation, went undefeated in the Summer Promotion Qualifier, earning them a spot in the 2013 NA LCS Summer Split. Following their qualification, Quantic made the decision to revert the team's name back to Cloud9. However, the team would soon experience yet another ownership change, as former Team SoloMid manager Jack Etienne purchased the players' contracts for less than $20,000, solidifying the establishment of the Cloud9 organization.

=== 2013–2015: First seasons ===
==== Back-to-back LCS titles ====
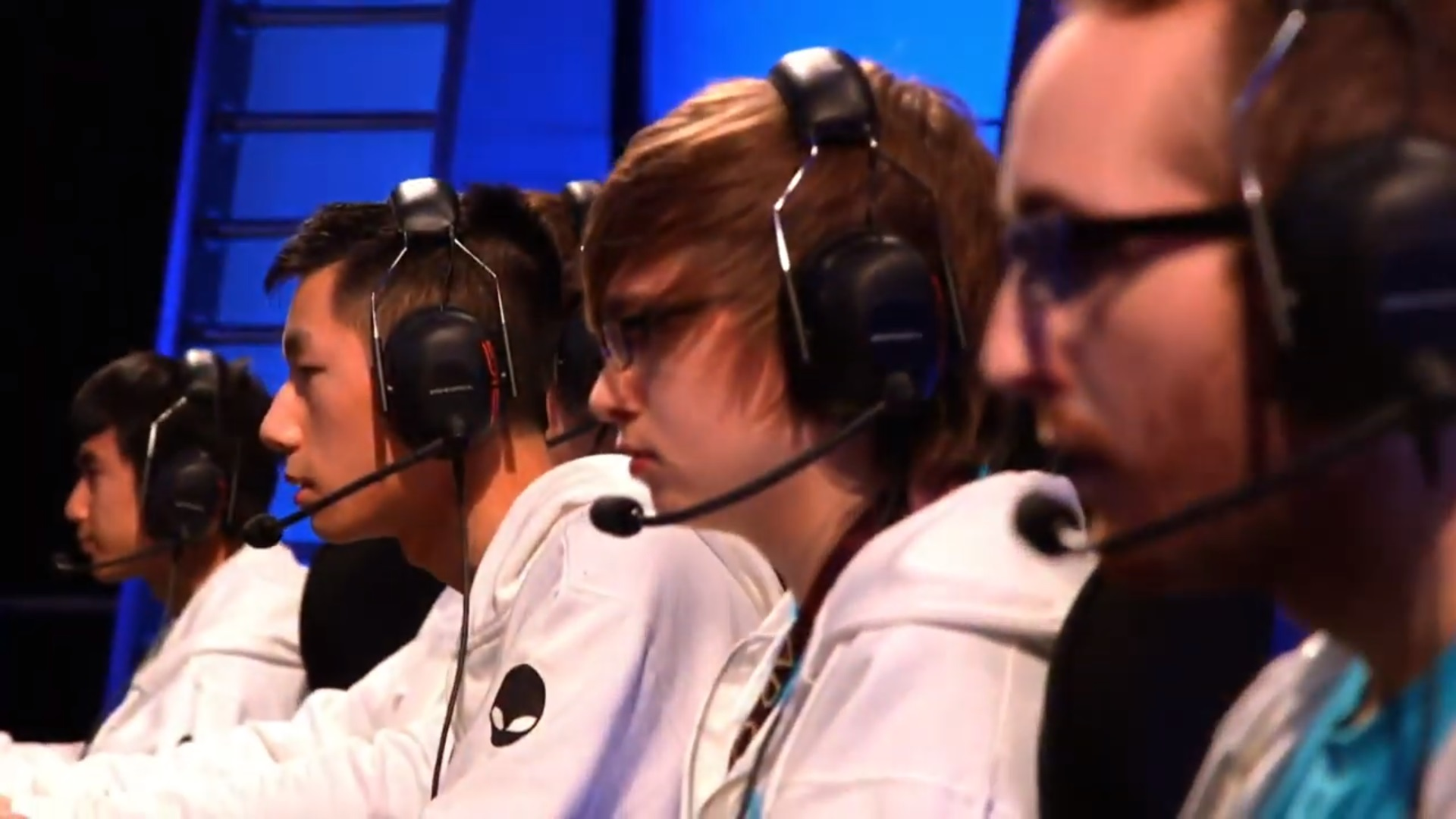
From left to right: Balls, Hai, Sneaky, LemonNation.

In the 2013 LCS Summer split regular season, the team went on a 13-game winning streak, marking the longest winning streak in LCS history at the time. They went on to finish the 2013 Summer split with a 25–3 game win–loss record to claim the top seed in the Summer Season Playoffs. With a bye into the semifinals, Cloud9 defeated Dignitas by a score of 2 games to 0. The team went on to sweep Team SoloMid, 3 games to 0, in the grand finals on September 1 to claim their first-ever LCS title. With the win, Cloud9 finished the season with a 30–3 game record and the highest winning-percentage in LCS history at 90.9%.

Due to their NA LCS Summer Season championship, Cloud9 received bye into the quarterfinals at the Season 3 World Championship (Worlds). In their first match, on September 23, Cloud9 lost to the top-seeded European team Fnatic by a score of 1 games to 2, eliminating them from the tournament. On October 29, the organization announced the departure of coach Alex Penn and the addition of Dan Dinh as the team's coach as the team planned to move from San Jose to Los Angeles. After a poll conducted earlier that month, Cloud9 was voted into IEM Season VIII - Cologne; the team received the most votes and was seeded directly into the semifinals. Cloud9 faced Gambit Gaming in the semifinals match on November 24, but Gambit took the win to move onto the finals. Cloud9 closed out 2013 by defeating European team Fnatic, 2–0, on December 22 at the Battle of the Atlantic. The win marked the first time that Cloud9 had defeated an international team.

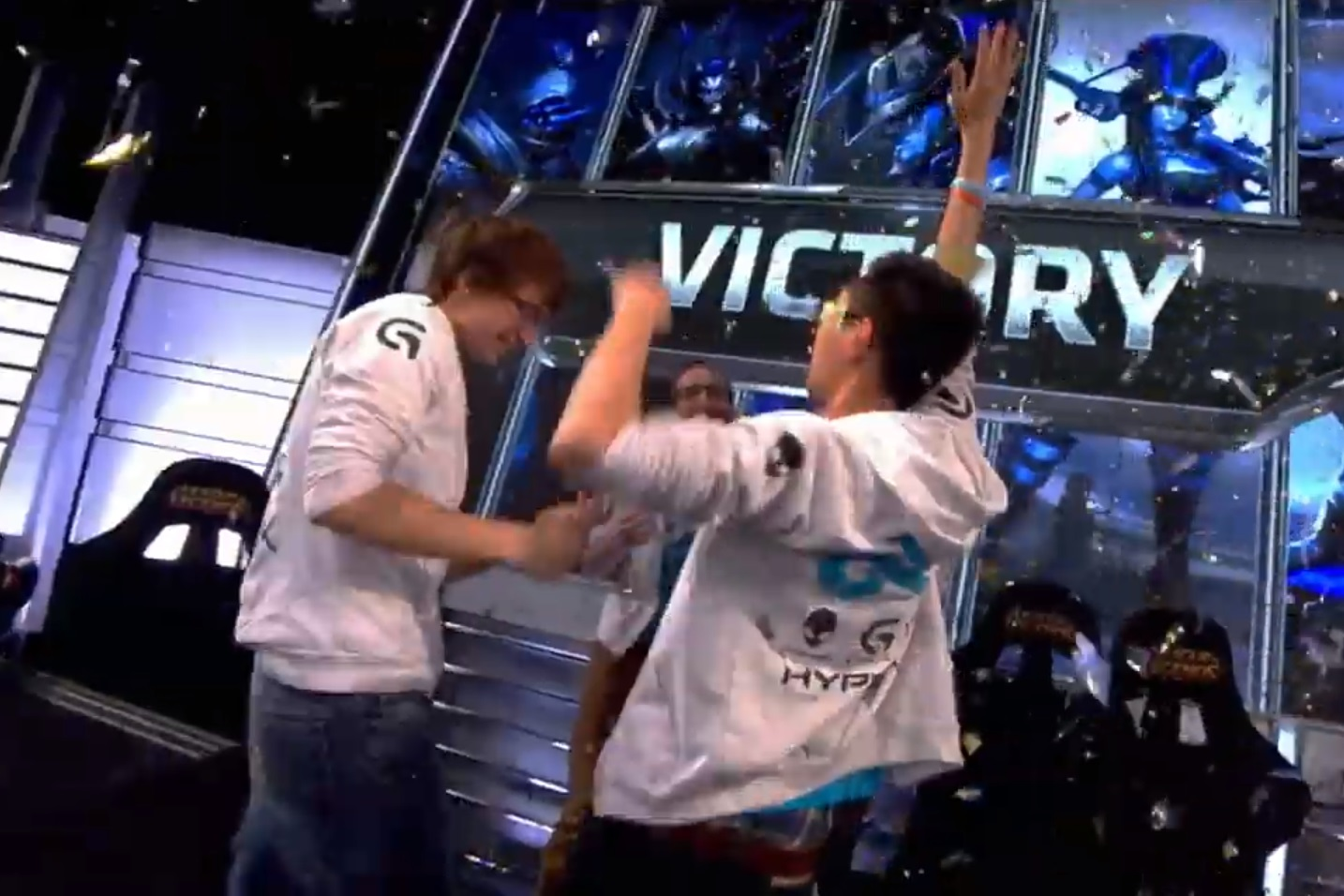
Cloud9 won the 2014 LCS Spring split championship.

In the 2014 NA LCS Spring Split, Cloud9 closed out the final five weeks on a 13-game winning streak, equaling their LCS record 13-game winning streak in 2013, to finish the regular season with a 24–4 record and the top seed in the playoffs. With a bye into the semifinals, Cloud9 first defeated Team Curse by a score of 2–0 in the playoffs. Cloud9 won their second consecutive LCS title after a 3–0 sweep over Team SoloMid in the grand finals on April 20. After going 5–0 in the playoffs, Cloud9 extended their record winning streak to 18 games and had gone undefeated in back-to-back playoffs.

Their LCS playoffs victory earned the team a spot in the 2014 All-Stars event in Paris, France. However, on April 30, Hai suffered a collapsed lung, which would prevent him from attending the All-Star event; two days later, Counter Logic Gaming's Link replaced him in the lineup on a loan. In group stage of the tournament, the team defeated OMG, Fnatic, and Taipei Assassins, but lost to SK Telecom T1 K, to finish the stage with a 3–1 record. In the playoff semifinals, Cloud9 lost to OMG, 0–2, and were eliminated from the playoffs.

In the 2014 NA LCS Summer Split, Cloud9 suffered a mid-season slump, falling to as low as fifth place in the season standings, but recovered to finish with a 18–10 record in the regular season and claim the top seed in the playoffs. After sweeping Team Curse the semifinals, Cloud9 advanced to the grand finals to face Team SoloMid for the third consecutive split. Cloud9 won the first game, extending their playoff winning streak dating back to the 2013 NA LCS Summer split, but dropped three of the next four games to lose the match, 2–3, and finish in second place.

With their finish at the 2014 NA LCS Summer split, Cloud9 qualified for the 2014 World Championship. In the World Championship group stages, Cloud9 became the first North American team in two years to defeat a Korean team after taking down NaJin White Shield. Cloud9 advanced to the knockout stage but lost to Samsung Galaxy Blue, 1–3, on October 4 in the quarterfinals. In November, Cloud9 was voted in by fans to play at IEM Season IX San Jose. In the tournament, the team swept paiN Gaming, 2–0, in the quarterfinals and defeated Alliance, 2–1, in the semifinals. The team took home their first IEM title on December 7 after they swept Unicorns of Love, 3–0, in the finals.

==== First roster changes ====
In the midst of the 2015 NA LCS Spring split regular season, Cloud9 competed in the IEM Katowice World Championship, which took place beginning on March 13, after qualifying as the winners of IEM San Jose in 2014. The team made an early exit in the tournament after falling to GE Tigers and Flash Wolves in their first two matches of the group stages.

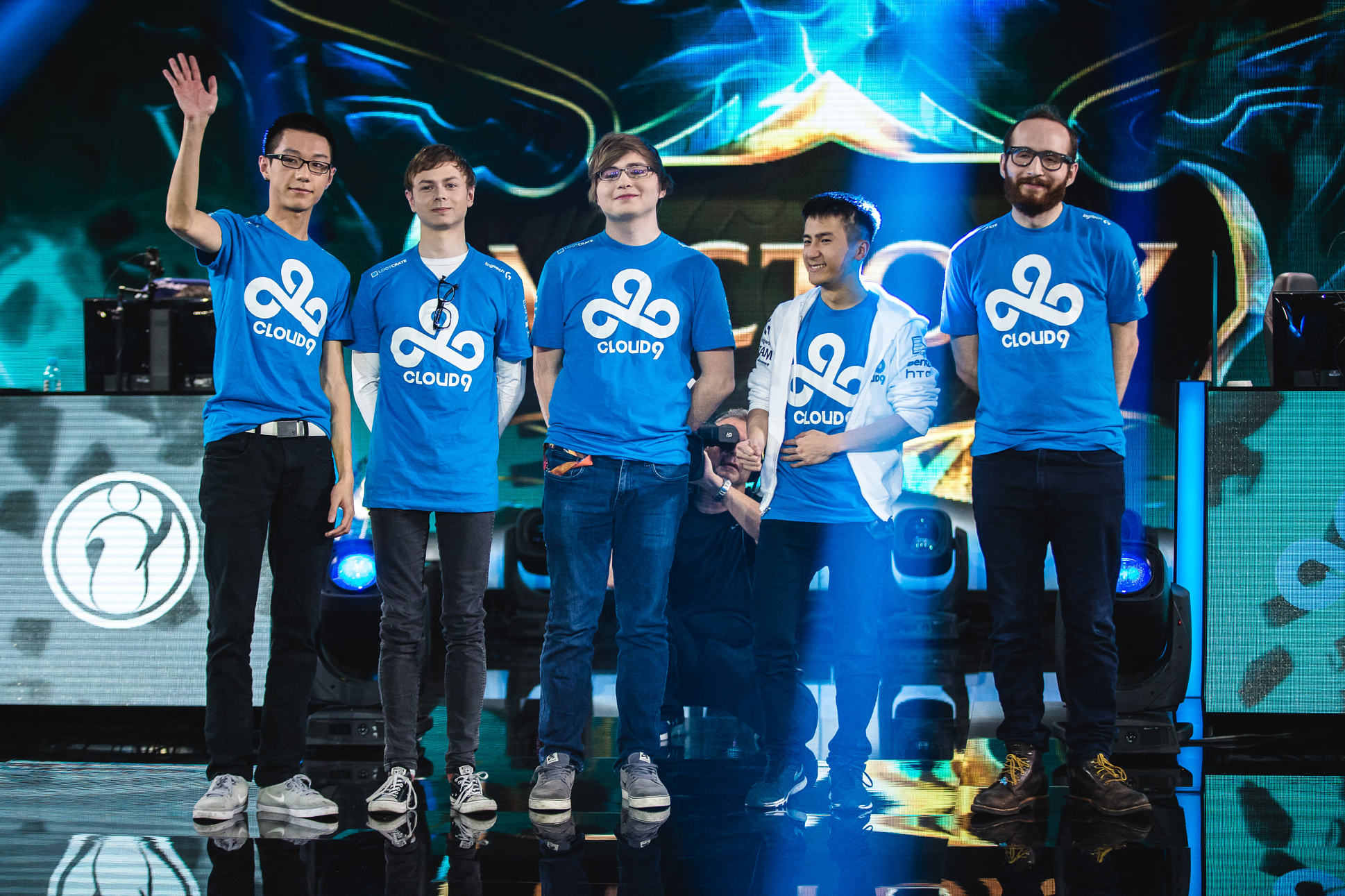
Cloud9 at 2015 Worlds

Cloud9 began the 2015 NA LCS Spring Split going 1–3. By the end of the regular season, the team finished with a 12–6 record, and after defeating Counter Logic Gaming in a tiebreaker match, they claimed the second seed and a first-round bye in the playoffs. After defeating Team Liquid in the semifinals match, Cloud9 advanced to the finals to face Team SoloMid for the fourth straight LCS split. Cloud9 took an early lead, winning the first game but dropped the following three, losing 1–3 and placing second for the second LCS split in a row. A few days after their second-place finish, on April 22, Hai officially retired from the team, citing chronic wrist pain and a loss of team confidence as the reasons for his retirement. Hai's retirement ended the team's nearly 750-day record of having the longest starting lineup in professional League of Legends history. While Hai stepped down as a competitor, he remained with Cloud9 in an organizational role as a partner management and team expansion assistant. On May 8, Cloud9 officially signed Incarnati0n as a replacement for Hai as mid-laner.

The team started the 2015 NA LCS Summer Split going 3–7. After the poor start, Meteos stepped down from the starting roster, later citing internal issues with his teammates. In his stead, Hai substituted back into the starting roster. Cloud9 dropped the three of the next four games, heading into the final two weeks with a 4–10 record and in eighth place – a low enough placement to be relegated. The team finished the season with a 6–12 record, and after defeating Team 8 in a tiebreaker match, they placed seventh in the regular season standings to avoid relegation but missed the LCS playoffs for the first time in their organization's history.

After avoiding LCS relegation, Cloud9 qualified for the North American Regional Qualifier for the 2015 World Championship as the last seed. In the tournament, they defeated Gravity Gaming, Team Impulse, and Team Liquid to earn North America's third seed in the World Championship tournament. Cloud9 started the group stages going 3–0 in the first week, defeating ahq eSports Club, Invictus Gaming, and Fnatic. In the second week of the group stage, they dropped three games in a row, and after losing a tiebreaker game against ahq, they were eliminated from the tournament.

On October 23, Cloud9 officially announced that LemonNation would be retiring as a competitor and transitioning to a coaching role. Cloud9 signed Rush and Bunny FuFuu in November, with Bunny FuFuu splitting time with Hai. With the new roster, Cloud9's final tournament of 2015 was IEM X Cologne, as the team qualified for the tournament after winning a fan vote. The team faced H2k-Gaming in the quarterfinals, but after winning game one of the match, they dropped the following two games and were eliminated from the tournament.

=== 2016–2020: Reapered era ===
==== First head coach ====
In the 2016 NA LCS Spring Split, Cloud9 finished the regular season with a 12–6 record and the third seed in the Spring playoffs. Jensen (formerly Incarnati0n) was named to the NA LCS Spring Split 1st All-Pro Team and was a runner-up for the league's Most Valuable Player award. The team faced Team SoloMid in the quarterfinals on April 2; they won the first game of the match but lost the following three to lose by a score of 1–3. Between splits, Cloud9 made the biggest roster changes in their organization's history, acquiring Impact from NRG eSports to replace Balls, bringing Meteos back to the main roster to replace Rush, and bringing Bunny FuFuu back to the main roster to replace Hai. Additionally, the team added former Edward Gaming coach Bok "Reapered" Han-gyu as the team's first official head coach.

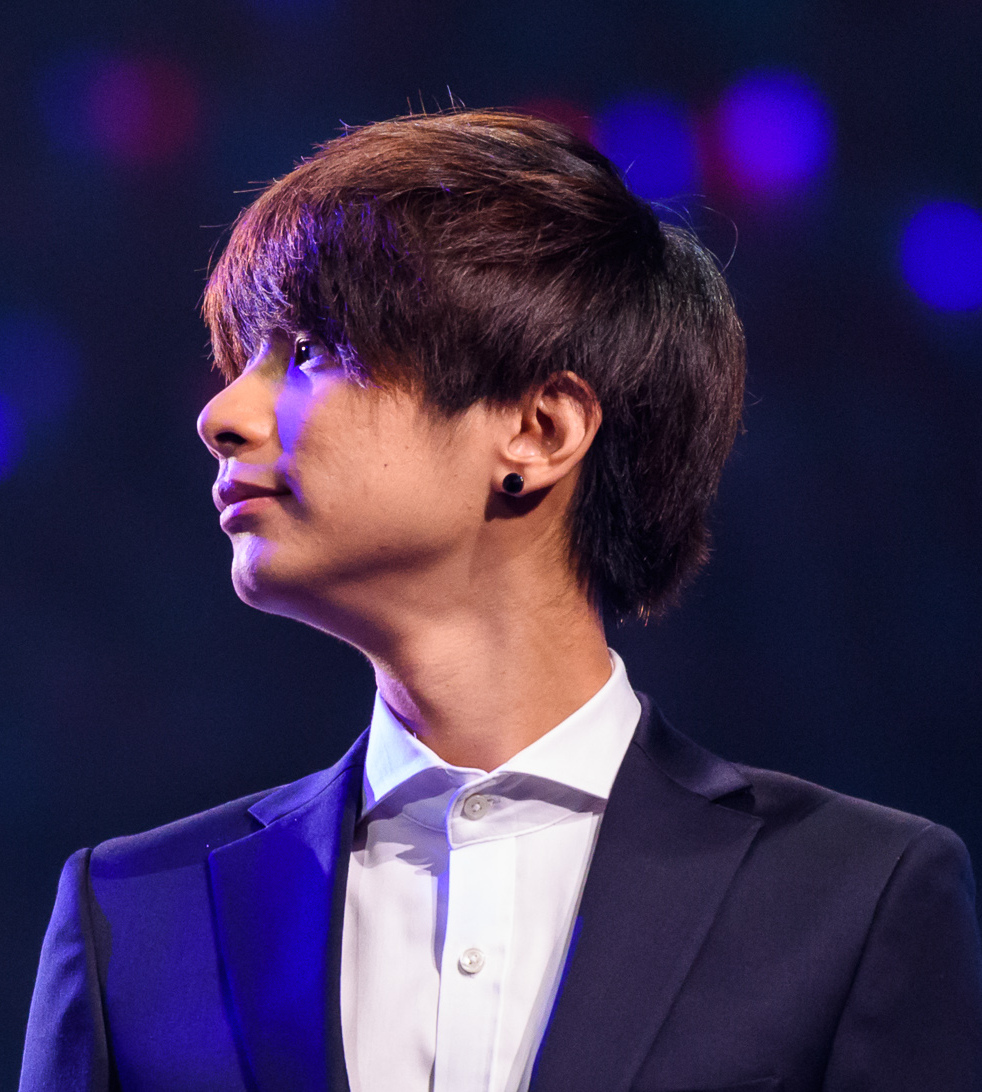
Bok "Reapered" Han-gyu was signed as head coach in 2016.

Cloud9 began the 2016 NA LCS Summer Split regular season with an 8–5 record. Up to this point in the season, Bunny FuFuu and Smoothie split starts, but on July 10, Bunny FuFuu stepped down from the starting roster. Similar to the 2016 Spring Split, Cloud9 finished the 2016 Summer Split regular season with a 12–6 record and the third seed in the Summer playoffs. In their quarterfinal match against Team EnVyUs, Jensen set an LCS record 20 kills in a single game as the team went on to win, 3–1. The team then defeated Immortals, 3–2, in the semifinals. For the fifth time in the team's history, Cloud9 faced Team SoloMid in the finals. In the match, Cloud9 took an early lead, winning the first game, but lost the following three, losing the match 1–3 and finishing the split in second place.

With their performance in the 2016 LCS season, Cloud9 qualified as the second seed in the North American Regional Qualifiers tournament for the 2016 World Championship. At the Regional Qualifiers, they swept Team EnVyUs, 3–0, in the second round and defeated Immortals, 3–1, in the finals, giving them the third seed for North America in the 2016 World Championship. At the 2016 World Championship, Cloud9 was placed in a group with IMay, SK Telecom T1, and Flash Wolves. Cloud9 went 3–3 in the group and earned the a spot a spot in quarterfinals, where they faced Samsung Galaxy on October 14. The team was swept by Samsung, 0–3, and were eliminated from the playoffs.

On December 19, Cloud9 officially announced they had promoted Contractz from their Challenger team to replace Meteos and signed former Dignitas player Ray as a substitute.

==== Quest for third title ====
Cloud9 went undefeated through the first four weeks of the 2017 NA LCS Spring Split, going 8–0. Prior to week five, the contract of Meteos, a substitute player for Cloud9 at the time, was sold to Phoenix1. The team finished the regular season in second place with a 14–4 record and a first-round bye in the Spring Split Playoffs. Smoothie was named to the 2017 NA LCS Spring Split 1st All-Pro team, Reapered was named the NA LCS Coach of the Split, and Contractz was named the NA LCS Rookie of the Split. In the playoffs, Cloud9 swept Phoenix1, 3–0, in the semifinals. For the sixth, and second consecutive, time, Cloud9 faced Team SoloMid in the NA LCS finals. After dropping the first two games of the match, Cloud9 won the following two to tie up the series but lost game five, finishing the split as the runners-up of the league.

After starting the 2017 NA LCS Summer Split with a 6–6 record, Cloud9 finished the split on a six-match winning streak to finish the regular season with a 12–6 record and the fourth seed in the playoffs. Jensen was named to the NA LCS Summer Split 1st All-Pro team and was the runner-up for the NA LCS Summer Split MVP. The team faced Team Dignitas in the quarterfinals of the Summer Split Playoffs on August 19; Cloud9 lost the match, 1–3, ending their 2017 LCS season.

Cloud9 was placed into the North America Regional Qualifiers for the 2017 World Championship play-in stage. The team defeated Counter Logic Gaming 3–1, to advance to the play-ins and represent North America as the third seed. In the play-in stage, Cloud9 was placed in a group with Team oNe and Dire Wolves. They went undefeated in their group with a 4–0 record to advance to the next stage of the play-ins. In the second stage, a single match against Lyon Gaming, Cloud9 swept Lyon, 3–0, and qualified into the Group Stage of the 2017 World Championship. In the group stage, Cloud9 was placed in a group which with Korea's SKT Telecom T1, China's EDward Gaming, and Taiwan's ahq e-Sports Club. They achieved a 3–3 record in the group stage and advanced to the knockout stage as the second seed from their group. In the quarterfinals, Cloud9 lost a 5-game match against Team WE from China and were eliminated from the tournament.

In November 2017, Cloud9 made multiple roster changes. The team lost Impact to free agency and signed Licorice as his replacement. Additionally, Cloud9 transferred Contractz to Golden Guardians and acquired Svenskeren from Team SoloMid as his replacement.

Cloud9 began the 2018 NA LCS Spring Split strong, going 8–2 through the first five weeks. They ended the split with an 11–7 record and in a four-way tie for third place with Team SoloMid, Team Liquid, and Clutch Gaming. After losing the third-place tiebreaker against Team Liquid and winning the fifth-place tiebreaker against Clutch Gaming, Cloud9 entered the playoffs as the fifth seed. Licorice was named the NA LCS Rookie of the Split, while head coach Reapered was the runner-up for the NA LCS Coach of the Split. In the playoffs, Cloud9 was swept by Team Liquid in the quarterfinals by a score of 0–3.

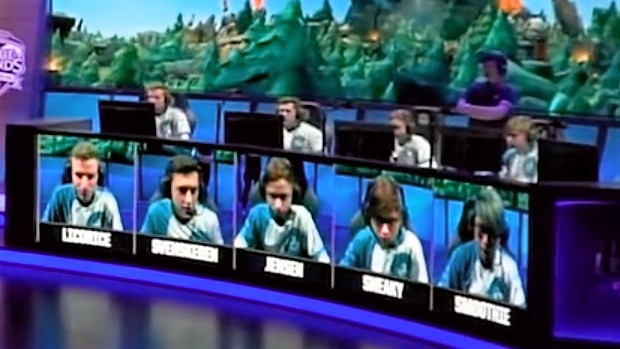
Cloud9 in-game with a match against Echo Fox in 2018

Before the Summer Split began, Jensen, Sneaky, and Smoothie were benched from the starting lineup, with Goldenglue, Keith, and Zeyzal being promoted from Cloud9's academy team as their replacements. With their starters benched, C9 started the Summer Split regular season with a 3–7 record and in last place through the first five weeks. In that time, Jensen and Sneaky returned to the starting roster in weeks three and four, respectively, as the team implemented a seven-man rotating roster, with Blaber and Svenskeren splitting starts at jungle and Jensen and Goldenglue splitting starts in the midlane. The team closed out the final four weeks of the regular season on an 8–0 run to finish the regular season in second place with an 11–7 record. Jensen was named to the All-Pro 1st Team, Blaber was named the Rookie of the Split, and Reapered was named the Coach of the Split. Cloud9 faced Team SoloMid in the semifinals match of the playoffs; after falling behind 1–2, Cloud9 won the final two games to win the match, 3–2, and advance to the finals. In the finals, they were swept by Team Liquid, 0–3, to finish as the runners-up of the split.

Cloud9 was placed in the North American Regional Qualifiers in order to qualify for the 2018 World Championship play-in stage. With a bye into the final, Cloud9 swept Team SoloMid, 3–0, in the finals match and earned a spot in the play-ins. Placed in a group with Japan's DentonatioN FocusMe and Brazil's KaBuM!, Cloud9 went 4–0 in their group and advanced to the second round of the play-ins. With a 3–2 victory over Russia's Gambit Esports, Cloud9 advanced to the 2018 World Championship. In the group stage, Cloud9 was grouped with Europe's Team Vitality, China's Royal Never Give Up (RNG), and Korea's Gen.G. The team finished with a 4–2 record in the group and tied for first with RNG; after losing a tiebreaker match against RNG, they finished second in their group and advanced to the knockout stage. In the quarterfinals, Cloud9 swept Korea's Afreeca Freecs, 3–0, and advanced to the semifinals. The win marked the first time in seven years that a North American team had qualified for the World Championship semifinals. Cloud9 was swept by Fnatic, 0–3, in the semifinals, ending their World Championship run.

In November, Jensen was transferred to Team Liquid; Cloud9 acquired Nisqy from Splyce as his replacement.

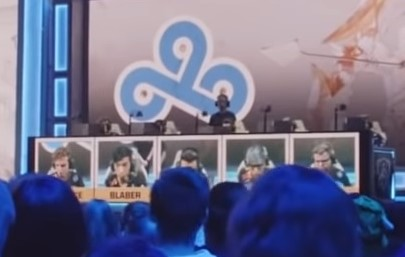
Cloud9 in the group stage at Worlds 2019

In the 2019 LCS Spring Split, Cloud9 secured the second seed and a bye to the semifinals of the playoffs after a win over FlyQuest on March 23. With a win over Clutch Gaming in their final regular season match, the team closed out the regular season with a 14–4 record. Licorice was named to the LCS All-Pro 1st Team and was the runner-up for the league's Most Valuable Player award, while head coach Reapered was named the Coach of the Split for the second split in a row. In the playoffs, Cloud9 faced Team SoloMid in the semifinals on April 13. After winning the first two games of the series, Cloud9 dropped the following three to lose the match by a score of 2–3.

Through the first six weeks of the 2019 LCS Summer Split, Cloud9 accrued an 8–4 record. Prior to week seven, the team traded Keith to Golden Guardians in exchange for Deftly. Cloud9 finished the regular season with a 12–6 record, again claiming the second seed in the playoffs and qualifying directly to the semifinals. Svenskeren won the Summer Split Most Valuable Player award and was named to the LCS All-Pro 1st Team. In the semifinals match, the team took a 3–1 win over Counter Logic Gaming and advanced to their seventh all-time LCS finals match. Cloud9 faced Team Liquid in the finals; after leading the series 2–1, Cloud9 lost the final two games to lose the match, 2–3, and finish the split at the runners-up.

After their LCS finish, Cloud9 qualified directly into the group stage for the 2019 World Championship as North America's second seed. In the group stage, Cloud9 was drawn into a group with Griffin, G2 Esports, and Hong Kong Attitude. The team finished with a 2–4 record in the group, failing to advance to the knockout stage for the first time since 2015.

After their 2019 season, the team acquired Dignitas' player Vulcan in exchange for a reported $1.5 million and academy player Johnsun. Additionally, Cloud9 parted ways with Sneaky, the team's starting AD carry of the past seven years, although later it was announced that Sneaky would remain as a part of the organization as an owner, advisor, and streamer. The team signed former Team SoloMid player Zven as his replacement.

==== Third LCS title and first World Championship absence ====
Cloud9 began the 2020 LCS Spring Split with a 12–0 record through the first six weeks, securing a spot in the winners bracket of the playoffs in the process. The team's first, and only, loss in the regular season came on March 7, when they fell to Team SoloMid in week 7. Cloud9 finished the regular season with a 17–1 record – tied for the best game record in LCS history – and the top seed in the playoffs. All five starters, Licorice, Blaber, Nisqy, Zven, and Vulcan, were named to the 2020 LCS Spring Split All-Pro 1st Team, head coach Reapered was named the Coach of the Split, and Blaber won LCS Spring Split Most Valuable Player award. In first round of the upper bracket of the playoffs, Cloud9 swept 100 Thieves, 3–0. The team then defeated Evil Geniuses, 3–1, in the upper bracket finals, advancing them to their second consecutive finals appearance. Cloud9 secured their third LCS title on April 19 after they swept FlyQuest, 3–0, in the finals. The win gave the team their first LCS title since 2014. With an overall 26–2 game win–loss record, including playoffs, for the split, Cloud9 set a LCS record for the highest winning percentage ever in a single split by a North American team at 92.9%, breaking their previous record of 90.9% from the 2013 Summer Split. The win qualified the team their first Mid-Season Invitational, but the event was canceled due to the COVID-19 pandemic.

Cloud9 initially carried their momentum from the Spring Split into the 2020 LCS Summer Split, posting a 9–0 record regular season record throughout the first half of the split. However, their momentum came to an end, as the team only won two of their next six games, including suffering their first 0–2 week for the first time in two years. After splitting their final two games, they finished the regular season in second place with a 13–5 record and a bye into the second round of the playoffs. Blaber and Zven were named to the 2020 LCS Summer Split All-Pro 1st Team. In the second round of the upper bracket of the playoffs, Cloud9 fell to FlyQuest, 1–3, dropping them into the lower bracket. The team then swept Evil Geniuses, 3–0, in the second round of the lower bracket. Cloud9's playoff run ended after they lost to Team SoloMid, 1–3, in the third round of the lower bracket. Due to changes made in the 2020 LCS season, where only the top three teams from the Summer Split would qualify 2020 World Championship, Cloud9 did not qualify for the 2020 World Championship, marking the first time in the organization's history that they would not attend the World Championship.

On September 14, Cloud9 parted ways with head coach Bok "Reapered" Hangyu, who had been the head coach of the team for the past four years. The organization promoted Cloud9's academy team coach Kim "Reignover" Yeu-jin as their new head coach. While the organization originally stated that the 2020 player roster would remain together going into the 2021 season, it was later announced that the team had parted ways with Licorice and Nisqy; the team promoted Fudge from their academy team and acquired Perkz from G2 Esports as their replacements.

=== 2021–present ===
==== Fourth LCS title ====
The LCS made major changes for the 2021 LCS season onwards. Records for the Spring and Summer Splits would no longer be separated; records from the Spring Split carry over to the Summer Split. Additionally, the Spring Split Playoffs were replaced by the Mid-Season Showdown, which acts as a qualifier for the Mid-Season Invitational, and the Summer Split Playoffs were replaced by the LCS Championship, which would then act as a qualifier for the World Championship.

Cloud9 sat atop the regular season standings throughout the entirety of the Spring Split of the 2021 LCS season, and after a win over Immortals in their Spring final regular season match, Cloud9 finished with the first half of the season with a 13–5 record and secured the top seed in the 2021 Mid-Season Showdown. Blaber, Perkz, and Zven were all named to the 2021 LCS Spring Split All-Pro 1st Team, and Vulcan was named to the 2nd Team, while the Cloud9 coaching staff won the Coaching Staff of the Split award. In the Mid-Season Showdown, Cloud9 defeated 100 Thieves, 3–0, and Team Liquid, 3–1, to advance to the finals. In the finals match, the team once again faced Team Liquid, who had made it to the finals through the lower bracket of the playoffs. Cloud9 took home their fourth LCS title on April 11 after taking down Team Liquid by a score of 3–2.

Cloud9's Mid-Season Showdown title qualified them to play in the 2021 Mid-Season Invitational (MSI) as the sole representatives of North America. For the first round of the tournament, Cloud9 was placed into Group C with Korea's DWG KIA, Japan's DetonatioN FocusMe and Latin America's Infinity Esports. After a 1–2 win–loss record to begin the group stage, Cloud9 won their final three matches to finish the group stage with a 4–2 record and advanced to the next stage of the tournament, the Rumble stage, as the second seed from their group, behind DWG KIA. Cloud9 finished the Rumble stage with three wins and seven losses and did not advance to the next stage of the tournament. Following their fifth-place finish in the MSI, Cloud9 promoted Calvin "K1ng" Truong from their academy team and sent Zven to their academy team. Additionally, Reignover stepped down as head coach to become the team's new assistant coach, while Alfonso "Mithy" Rodriguez took over as the team's new head coach.

After beginning the Spring Split of the 2021 LCS season with a 4–5 record, Cloud9 brought Zven back to the starting roster, and K1ng returned to the Academy team. After posting a 21–12 record partially through the season, the team secured a spot in the LCS Championship on July 6. Cloud9 finished the 2021 regular season in fourth place with a 27–18 record. In the first match of the double-elimination 2021 LCS playoffs, Cloud9 faced Team Liquid, and lost by a score of 1–3, sending them to the lower bracket. The team went on to win three series in a row in the lower bracket, defeating Golden Guardians, Evil Geniuses, and Team SoloMid by scores of 3–0, 3–0, and 3–2, respectively, securing the third and final spot for North America at the 2021 World Championship in the process. The team lost 1–3 in the lower bracket finals to 100 Thieves, ending their playoff run.

At Worlds, Cloud9 started in the Play–In stage, and were drawn into Group A, alongside Taiwan's Beyond Gaming, Japan's Detonation FocusMe, Turkey's Galatasaray Esports, and the Unicorns of Love of the LCL. The team went 3–1 in the group stage, placing second in their group after losing the tiebreaker to Detonation FocusMe, before defeating PEACE from Oceania with a score of 3–0 to qualify for the main event. In the group stage, Cloud9 were placed in Group A alongside Korea's Dawmon Kia (DK), China's FunPlus Phoenix (FPX), and Europe's Rogue. Group A was dubbed the "Group of death" by the media, as it hosted the two previous World Championship winners in DK and FPX, who were the favorites to win the tournament. Cloud9 lost their first three games, before winning two of their three games on the last day, putting them at a three-way tie with Rogue and FPX, with each team sitting at a 2–4 record. Cloud9 won the tiebreaker game, which was against Rogue, and advanced to the quarterfinals, becoming the first North American team to make it past the group stage since the previous Cloud9 team reached semifinals in 2018. In the quarterfinals, Cloud9 were matched up against Korea's Gen.G, and were swept 0–3, ending their run, and placing 5th–8th overall.

==== Fifth and sixth LCS titles ====
For the 2022 LCS season, massive roster and coaching staff changes would be made. With Perkz and Vulcan leaving the roster, Fudge role-swapped to mid-lane from top-lane and the team signed Korean players Park "Summit" Woo-tae, Kim "Beserker" Min-cheol, and Kim "Winsome" Dong-keon, alongside Nick "LS" Desare as their new head coach. The roster was dubbed "Korea9" by the community due to the roster only having two non-Korean players on the team. After a strong 3–1 start to the split, falling only to heavy favorite Team Liquid, it was announced less than an hour before Cloud9's first match of week three that LS had been dismissed as head coach and his position was filled by assistant coach Max Waldo. Regardless, Cloud9 would end the regular split in sole position of second place, but would end the Spring Split Playoffs in fourth after 0–3 defeats to both 100 Thieves and Evil Geniuses, only managing to beat Golden Guardians in a best of 5 during the first round of the losers bracket. On May 2, Isles, Summit, and Winsome departed Cloud9. After the collapse of the team in Spring Split, the team underwent even more roster changes. For Summer Split, Fudge returned back to the top lane, returning player Jensen was signed as their new mid laner, and Zven rejoined the roster role-swapping to support from ADC. This roster would go on to see success regionally, winning their 5th LCS Title in the 2022 LCS Summer Split with a 3-0 record in the finals against 100 Thieves. The team had a difficult run during 2022 League of Legends World Championship. Representing the LCS First Seed, Cloud9 was drawn into Group A, dubbed a "group of death" by the community as the group consisted of LCK's T1, LPL's Edward Gaming, and LEC's Fnatic. The team would fail to make it out of the group stage, ending the tournament with a 1-5 record in their group having only won a single best of one against Fnatic.

In 2023, Jensen left Cloud9 to play for Dignitas. In his place, Diplex was signed to the starting position for mid lane. The announced starting roster consisted of Fudge, Blaber, Dimitri "Diplex" Ponomarev, Berserker, and Zven. The roster started out Spring Split 2023 well, going 4-2 in the first four weeks of the season this change would be made permanent for the remainder of the 2023 season. The team would go on to win the 2023 LCS Spring Split, defeating Golden Guardians 3-1 in the Finals, qualifying them for the 2023 Mid-Season Invitational and giving them their 6th domestic title. The team would make it out of the Group Stage, but lose in Round 1 of the Bracket Stage 0-3 to LPL's Bilibili Gaming, ending MSI in 5th/6th alongside LEC's G2. Going into Summer Split, the roster remained the same and were heavy favorites for the title going into playoffs, finishing first in the regular season. Cloud9 would go on to lose 2-3 to NRG in the finals, securing the second seed to represent LCS at the 2023 League of Legends World Championship. The team would once again have a disappointing showing at Worlds 2023, finishing 1-3 in the newly introduced Swiss Stage, ending their tournament in 12th place.

In 2024, Zven would leave the roster to play for Dignitas, role-swapping back to ADC, and Vulcan would return to Cloud9 alongside Canadian mid-lane prodigy Joseph Joon "Jojopyun" Pyun in EMENES' absence. Keeping Berserker and Blaber, the team finished third in both the regular season and in playoffs, losing 0-3 Team Liquid in Losers Finals, failing to qualify for the 2024 Mid-Season Invitational. For the 2024 Summer Split, Cloud9 would replace Fudge in the top lane with rising Korean talent Park "Thanatos" Seung-gyu from LCK Challengers whilst bringing back Bok "Reapered" Han-gyu as head coach to help the young Korean player adjust to life in Los Angeles. The team would finish second in the regular season, however would fail to qualify for Worlds 2024 after a difficult 1-3 loss to 100 Thieves in Lower Bracket Round 2.

== Rivalries ==
=== Team SoloMid ===
Team SoloMid and Cloud9, two of the oldest professional Western League of Legends teams, developed a rivalry as a result of their four consecutive North American League of Legends Championship Series (NA LCS) finals matches from Summer 2013 to Spring 2015. In 2013, former Team SoloMid manager Jack Etienne purchased the contracts of the players of Cloud9, and the team's first season was in the 2013 NA LCS Summer Split. Earlier that year, Team SoloMid had won the 2013 Spring Split, making them the defending champions of the LCS. The first meeting between the teams took place in Cloud9's first-ever LCS Regular Season match on June 12, 2013; Cloud9 went on to win the match. Cloud9 defeated Team SoloMid in the 2013 Summer and 2014 Spring finals. In the following two LCS Finals, Team SoloMid defeated Cloud9 in both the 2014 Summer and 2015 Spring finals.

They met again in three consecutive NA LCS playoffs from Spring 2016 to Spring 2017; Team SoloMid won each match, which included the 2016 Summer and 2017 Spring finals. Cloud9 defeated Team SoloMid in the 2018 Summer semifinals. The same year, Cloud9 took down Team SoloMid in the 2018 World Championship play-ins, eliminating Team SoloMid from qualifying for the World Championship. In 2019, Team SoloMid defeated swept Cloud9 in the 2019 Spring semifinals match. Team SoloMid handed Cloud9 their only loss in the 2020 Spring Regular Season. Team SoloMid eliminated Cloud9 in Summer 2020 Playoffs, which also prevented Cloud9 from securing a spot at the 2020 World Championship. The following year Cloud9 returned the favor, defeating Team SoloMid in the 2021 Summer Playoffs, eliminating them from post-season contention and in doing so, Cloud9 claimed the finals spot at Worlds 2021.

== Roster ==
Cloud9 League of Legends roster
Players
Coaches

Role	Handle	Name	Nationality
Top	Thanatos	Park Seung-gyu	South Korea
Jungle	Blaber	Huang, Robert	United States
Mid	APA	Stearns, Eain	United States
Bot	Zven	Svenningsen, Jesper	Denmark
Support	Vulcan	Laflamme, Philippe	Canada

Head coach

- Nick "Inero" Smith

Assistant coach(es)

- Christian "IWDominate" Rivera
- Marius "Veigar v2" Aune

Legend:
- (I) Inactive
- (S) Suspended
- Substitute
- (injured) Injury / Illness

Roster updated November 25, 2025.

== Season-by-season records ==
Year		League Championship Series						Mid-Season Invitational	World Championship	Ref.
Year		P	W	L	W–L%	Pos.	Playoffs	Mid-Season Invitational	World Championship	Ref.
2013	Summer	28	24	4	.857	1st	Winners	–	Quarterfinals	
2014	Spring	28	18	10	.643	1st	Winners	–	Quarterfinals	
2014	Summer	28	20	8	.714	1st	Runners-up	–	Quarterfinals	
2015	Spring	18	12	6	.667	2nd	Runners-up	Did not qualify	Group stage	
2015	Summer	18	6	12	.333	7th	Did not qualify	Did not qualify	Group stage	
2016	Spring	18	12	6	.667	3rd	Quarterfinals	Did not qualify	Quarterfinals	
2016	Summer	18	12	6	.667	3rd	Runners-up	Did not qualify	Quarterfinals	
2017	Spring	18	14	4	.778	2nd	Runners-up	Did not qualify	Quarterfinals	
2017	Summer	18	12	6	.667	4th	Quarterfinals	Did not qualify	Quarterfinals	
2018	Spring	18	11	7	.611	5th	Quarterfinals	Did not qualify	Semifinals	
2018	Summer	18	11	7	.611	2nd	Runners-up	Did not qualify	Semifinals	
2019	Spring	18	14	4	.778	2nd	Semifinals	Did not qualify	Group stage	
2019	Summer	18	12	6	.667	2nd	Runners-up	Did not qualify	Group stage	
2020	Spring	18	17	1	.944	1st	Winners	None held (Note: Cloud9 qualified for the 2020 Mid-Season Invitational, but the event was cancelled due to COVID-19.)	Did not qualify	
2020	Summer	18	13	5	.722	2nd	Lower bracket round 3	None held	Did not qualify	
2021	Spring	45	28	17	.622	1st	Winners	Rumble stage	Quarterfinals	
2021	Summer	45	28	17	.622	4th	Lower bracket finals	Rumble stage	Quarterfinals	
2022	Spring	18	13	5	.722	2nd	Lower bracket finals	Did not qualify	Group stage	
2022	Summer	18	10	8	.556	5th	Winners	Did not qualify	Group stage	
2023	Spring	18	14	4	.778	1st	Winners	Lower bracket quarterfinals	Swiss stage	
2023	Summer	18	13	5	.722	1st	Runners-up	Lower bracket quarterfinals	Swiss stage	
Totals		417	286	131	.686	(2013–2023, includes only regular season)				

== Accomplishments and awards ==
LCS Most Valuable Player

- Svenskeren – Summer 2019
- Blaber – Spring 2020, Spring 2021
- Summit – Spring 2022
- Berserker – Spring 2023

LCS Finals MVP

- Hai – Spring 2014
- Vulcan – Spring 2020
- Perkz – Spring 2021
- Berserker – Summer 2022
- Fudge – Spring 2023

LCS Rookie of the Split

- Contractz – Spring 2017
- Licorice – Spring 2018
- Blaber – Summer 2018

LCS Coach of the Split

- Reapered – Spring 2017, Summer 2018, Spring 2020
- Coaching staff – Spring 2021, Spring 2023

LCS All-Pro First Team

- Jensen – Spring 2016, Summer 2017, Summer 2018
- Smoothie – Spring 2017
- Licorice – Spring 2019, Spring 2020–Summer 2020
- Blaber – Spring 2020–Spring 2021, Spring 2022, Spring 2023, Summer 2023
- Nisqy – Spring 2020
- Zven – Spring 2020–Spring 2021
- Vulcan – Spring 2020
- Perkz – Spring 2021
- Fudge – Summer 2021, Spring 2023
- Summit – Spring 2022
- Berserker – Spring 2023, Summer 2023

LCS All-Pro Second Team

- Rush – Spring 2016
- Sneaky – Spring 2016–Spring 2017, Summer 2018–Spring 2019
- Hai – Spring 2016
- Impact – Spring 2017
- Jensen – Spring 2017, Spring 2018
- Contractz – Summer 2017
- Smoothie – Summer 2017–Spring 2018
- Licorice – Summer 2018, Summer 2019
- Zeyzal – Summer 2018–Spring 2019
- Svenskeren – Spring 2019–Summer 2019
- Nisqy – Summer 2019
- Vulcan – Summer 2020–Spring 2021
- Berserker – Spring 2022, Summer 2022
- Zven – Spring 2023, Summer 2023
- EMENES – Spring 2023

LCS All-Pro Third Team

- Balls – Spring 2016
- Impact – Summer 2016
- Jensen – Summer 2016
- Sneaky – Summer 2017–Spring 2018
- Svenskeren – Spring 2018
- Nisqy – Spring 2019, Summer 2020
- Zeyzal – Summer 2019
- Blaber – Summer 2021
- Fudge – Spring 2022, Summer 2023
- EMENES – Summer 2023

== Notes ==
Awards and achievements
Preceded by Team SoloMid; Team Liquid; Team SoloMid; Evil Geniuses	League Championship Series winner Summer 2013 – Spring 2014; Spring 2020; Spring 2021; Summer 2022 – Spring 2023	Succeeded by Team SoloMid; Team SoloMid; 100 Thieves
