= Intel Extreme Masters Season X – Cologne =

- 2015

Tournament information
- Location: Cologne, Germany
- Dates: 18 December 2015–18 December 2015
- Host(s): Electronic Sports League
- Venue(s): ESL Arena
- Teams: 6
- Purse: $50,000 USD

Final positions
- Champion: Ever
- 1st runner-up: Qiao Gu Reapers
- 2nd runner-up: Fnatic, H2k-Gaming

Intel Extreme Masters Season X – Cologne (or IEM Cologne) was an esports event held at the ESL Arena in Cologne from 18 to 20 December 2015. There was only a tournament for League of Legends.

== Final standings ==
Place	Team	Roster	Coach	Prize money
1st	Ever	Crazy, Area, Athena, LokeN, Key	Kim Ga-ram	$25,000
2nd	Qiao Gu Reapers	V, Swift, Doinb, TnT, TcT	Lee "Hiro" Woo-suk	$11,000
3rd–4th	Fnatic	Gamsu, Spirit, Febiven, Rekkles, NoXiAK	Luis "Deilor" Sevilla Petit	$5,000
3rd–4th	H2K-Gaming	Odoamne, Jankos, Ryu, FORG1VEN, VandeR	Neil "PR0LLY" Hammad	$5,000
5th–6th	Team Dignitas	Smittyj, Kirei, Shiphtur, Apollo, Jesse	Ram "Brokenshard" Djemal	$2,000
5th–6th	Cloud9	Balls, Rush, Jensen, Sneaky, Hai	Daerek "LemonNation" Hart	$2,000
