= WildTurtle =

Canadian video game player

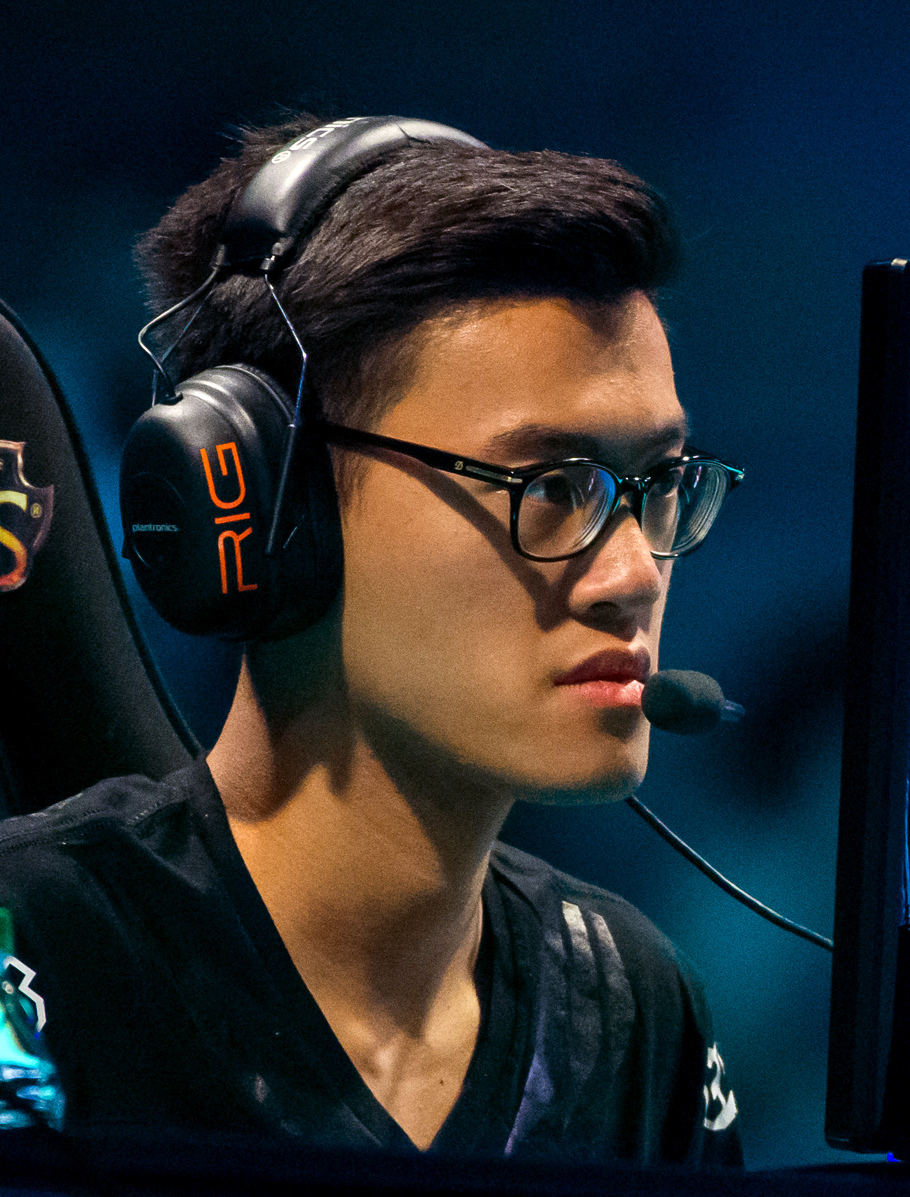
- Tran in 2016

Personal information
- Name: Jason Tran
- Born: February 9, 1995 (age 31); Toronto, ON
- Nationality: Canadian

Career information
- Game: League of Legends
- Playing career: 2011–2025
- Role: Bot Laner

Team history

As player:
- 2011: Forty Bus Gaming
- 2011–2012: Monomaniac eSports
- 2012: Kill Steal Gaming
- 2012: Orbit Gaming
- 2012: Quantic Gaming
- 2012–2013: Cloud9
- 2013–2015: Team SoloMid
- 2016: Immortals
- 2017: Team SoloMid
- 2017–2020: FlyQuest
- 2021: Counter Logic Gaming
- 2022: Immortals
- 2023: Team SoloMid
- 2024: Shopify Rebellion

As coach:
- 2024: Shopify Rebellion

Career highlights and awards
- 4× NA LCS champion

Jason Tran, also known as his nickname in-game WildTurtle, is a former Canadian professional League of Legends player. He previously played for Team SoloMid, Cloud9, CLG, Immortals, FlyQuest and Shopify Rebellion in the LCS . WildTurtle played in the 2013, 2014, 2015, and 2020 World Championships.

WildTurtle is one of the players with the most games played in LCS.

== Early life ==
WildTurtle used to play Defense of the Ancients, but transitioned to League of Legends to play with his friends. He returned to the game at the end of 9th grade after a one-year hiatus.

== Career ==
During Season 1 of League of Legends (2010–2011), WildTurtle played for Forty Bus Gaming and Kill Steal Gaming. He played for Monomaniac eSports prior to IPL (IGN Pro League) Season 4.

=== 2012 ===
Wildturtle was a substitute for Team Legion at the IPL Face Off: San Francisco Showdown on August 11 and 12 and played against Team WE. Later in the month, he played for Counter Logic Gaming Black at the MLG (Major League Gaming) Summer Championship, replacing Austin "LiNk" Shin as their mid-laner. They lost 0–2 to Team Dignitas in the second round of the tournament.

On October 20 Orbit Gaming announced that they were replacing their Attack Damage Carry (ADC) Nientohsoh with WildTurtle. Nientohsoh would move to the mid position, replacing nubbypoohbear who had left the team. The team left the organization on November 1, stating that some prize money was stolen and that equipment was never given to them. They renamed to Reddit Nation, and attended the Lone Star Clash 2 event. After the tournament Quantic Gaming announced that they had acquired the team.

On December 4, Quantic Gaming disbanded. Sources stated that investors withdrew funding without notifying the organization. The team was released on December 12 and renamed to the placeholder name NomNom. They finished in the top three at the Season 3 North American MLG Online Qualifiers and secured a spot to the offline qualifier for the League of Legends Championship Series (LCS).

=== 2013 ===
NomNom renamed to Cloud9 on January 8. They did not pass the offline qualifier for the LCS.

In March, the ADC of Team SoloMid (TSM), Chaox, was benched, then removed from the organization as a result of his lackluster performance, extracurricular activities, and attitude. WildTurtle, a substitute for TSM since February, became their starting ADC after initially substituting for Chaox when he was benched. Cloud9 replaced WildTurtle with SnEaKyCaStRoO.

TSM took first place in the North American League of Legends Championship Series (NA LCS) Spring Split. They lost 0–3 to Cloud9 in the finals of the NA LCS Summer Split playoffs.

=== 2014 ===
At the NA LCS Summer Split playoffs, TSM defeated Cloud9 in the finals 3–2, claiming first place.

TSM lost 1–3 to Samsung White in the quarterfinals of the 2014 World Championship in October.

In December, TSM lost 0–2 to Unicorns of Love in the quarterfinals of the Intel Extreme Masters Season (IEM) IX San Jose tournament.

=== 2015 ===
At the IEM Season IX – World Championship in March, TSM defeated Team WE 3–0 in the finals to win the tournament.

In April, TSM claimed first place at the NA LCS Spring Split playoffs after defeating Cloud9 3–1.

The team was eliminated from the Mid-Season Invitational in May in the group stage.

In August, TSM lost 0–3 to Counter Logic Gaming (CLG) in the finals of the NA LCS Summer Split playoffs.

TSM was eliminated from the 2015 World Championship in the group stage.

On December 7 Immortals announced that they had acquired WildTurtle.

=== 2016 ===
Immortals finished first in the NA LCS Spring Split regular season while having the best split in NA LCS history, with a 17–1 record.

Immortals lost 0–3 to TSM in the semifinals of the NA LCS Spring Split playoffs in April, then beat Team Liquid 3–0 in the third place match. Finishing second in the NA LCS Summer Split regular season, they lost 2–3 to Cloud9 in the semifinals, beating CLG 3–2 in the third-place match. Ending the season with the most championship points, they were seeded into the top of the regional qualifiers for the 2016 League of Legends World Championship, but were defeated by Cloud9 1–3, failing to qualify for the tournament.

In early November, WildTurtle was negotiating with Team Dignitas, and played as a substitute for TSM at IEM XI Oakland, where the team lost to Unicorns of Love in the semifinals. He then signed with the team on December 7, dropping negotiations with Dignitas and replacing Doublelift, who was taking a break from his pro-gaming career during the 2017 NA LCS Spring Split. He was replaced on Immortals by Cody Sun.

=== 2017 ===
In 2017, WildTurtle immediately helped the teams win 2017 LCS NA Spring Split and got tickets to MSI 2017.

At MSI, Team SoloMid finished with a 4–6 record, placing fifth out of six teams after lost tiebreak match against Flash Wolves.

In the 2017 Summer, WildTurtle joined Flyquest after TSM brought back Doublelift to active roster and also reunite some former Cloud9 player. They only finished 7th and lost regional qualifiers to go to Worlds.

=== 2018-2020 ===
From 2018 to 2020, WildTurtle and his team FlyQuest always in the middle of the rankings at LCS tournament and a time they finished last in the tournament. Until the 2020 season, they finally step up and finished 4th Spring and 2nd Summer and have a slot coming to Worlds 2020.

Coming in Worlds 2020, Flyquest were placed into Group D and finished third place with 3-3 record.

=== 2021-2023 ===
In 2021, WildTurle joined CLG and finished last bottom both Spring and Summer.

In 2022, WildTurtle rejoins Immortals but left after finished Spring Split with 10th place.

In 2023, WildTurtle rejoins TSM once again and played in challenger team in NACL, second tier LCS tournament. Shortly, he returns to main roster.

=== 2024-2025 ===
Coming into 2024 season, Shopify Rebellion acquires the roster and LCS spot of TSM and WildTurtle kept stay with the team as sub and coach. Also, he was streamer and content creator for the team until 2024 and early 2025.

Early 2025, WildTurtle announced his retirement in esports and trying on new things on life through video in channel team.

== Tournament results ==
=== Team SoloMid ===
- 2nd - 2013 NA LCS season Spring
- 1st - Season 3 NA LCS Summer
- 2nd - 2014 NA LCS Spring Playoffs
- 1st - 2014 NA LCS Summer Playoffs
- 1st - IEM IX World Championship - Katowice

=== Immortals ===
- 1st - 2016 NA LCS Spring Split Round Robin
- 3rd - 2016 NA LCS Spring Playoffs
- 2nd — 2016 NA LCS Summer regular season
- 3rd — 2016 NA LCS Summer playoffs
