= Balls (gamer) =

American professional esports player

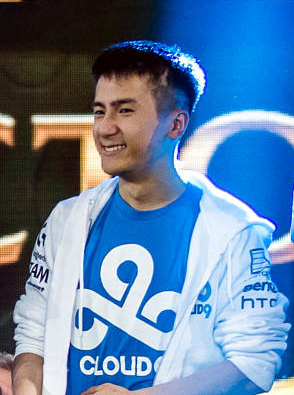
- Le in 2015

Personal information
- Name: An Le
- Nationality: American

Career information
- Games: League of Legends
- Playing career: 2011–2017
- Role: Top-laner

Team history
- 2011–2012: APictureOfAGoose
- 2012: mTw North America
- 2012: Monomaniac Ferus
- 2012–2013: Meat Playground
- 2013–2016: Cloud9
- 2016: Cloud9 Challenger
- 2017: FlyQuest

Career highlights and awards
- 2× NA LCS champion (2013 Summer, 2014 Spring)

An Le (Vietnamese: Lê Văn An) better known as Balls, is an American League of Legends player who most recently played professionally as the top laner for FlyQuest. As a member of Cloud9, Balls won the League of Legends Championship Series North America (NA LCS) twice and qualified for the League of Legends World Championship every year he was a part of the team.

== Playing career ==
Le began his career in 2011 as a part of North American team APictureOfAGoose. From late 2011 to late 2012, the team was picked up by mTw and renamed mTw.NA and, later, picked up by Monomaniac eSports and renamed to mMe Ferus. Le left the team in October 2012 and subsequently signed with team Meat Playground. Ten days after the 2013 NA LCS Spring Split qualifier, Meat Playground disbanded. Shortly after, Le signed with Cloud9.

On July 17, 2015, Balls was listed as a substituted of C9 Tempest, the Challenger Series team. On April 21, 2016, Cloud9 created its Challenger team headlined by Hai and Balls. In 2017, Le signed with FlyQuest. Although he never announced his retirement, Balls did not sign with another team after the 2017 season.

== Tournament results ==
=== Cloud9 ===
- 5/8th - 2013 League of Legends World Championship
- 3rd/4th - IEM Season VIII - Cologne
- 5/8th - 2014 League of Legends World Championship
- 2nd - 2015 North American League of Legends Championship Series Spring Playoffs
- 9/11th - 2015 League of Legends World Championship
