= Hai (gamer) =

American professional esports player

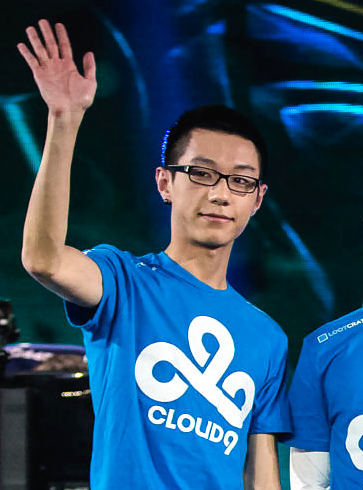
- Hai in 2015

Personal information
- Name: Lâm Du Hải
- Born: 1992 or 1993 (age 33–34)
- Nationality: American

Career information
- Game: League of Legends
- Playing career: 2012–2018
- Role(s): Mid, Jungle, Support

Team history
- 2012: Orbit Gaming
- 2013–2015: Quantic Gaming
- 2013–2016: Cloud9 (Note: Briefly rebranded to Quantic Gaming in early 2013.)
- 2016: Cloud9 Challenger
- 2017: FlyQuest
- 2018: Golden Guardians

Hai Lam (Vietnamese: Lâm Du Hải), better known mononymously as Hai, is an American former professional League of Legends player. He previously played mid lane for the Golden Guardians of the North American League of Legends Championship Series (NA LCS). Hai rose to prominence as the mid laner for Cloud9 (C9), leading them to two NA LCS championships. During a brief retirement due to health issues in 2015, he was Cloud9's Chief Gaming Officer. He returned to the team's lineup as their jungler and support to fill in for the split playoffs. He later became the mid laner for Cloud9 Challenger, which qualified for the LCS and was bought and rebranded as FlyQuest. Hai has won two NA LCS splits with Cloud9, as well as the NA LCS Promotion Tournament with Cloud9 Challenger. He is well known for his shot calling within the game.

Hai announced his retirement from the competitive League of Legends on April 23, 2018. In Spring 2019, he was part of the North America LCS analyst desk.

== Early life ==
Hai Lam moved to East Lansing, Michigan to attend Michigan State University, where he graduated with a Bachelor of Arts degree in Media Arts and Technology. He was a prominent member of the League of Legends club on campus.

== Career ==
=== Orbit Gaming ===
Hai began his professional League of Legends career in earnest as a part of Orbit Gaming in 2012. Orbit went on and was placed 7th/8th at the 2012 MLG Spring Championship. At the Spring Championship, Orbit defeated vVv Gaming 2–0 in the first round but lost 1–2 to Counter Logic Gaming Prime in the second round, which placed them in the losers' bracket. There, Orbit defeated Redact 2–0, Team Legion 2–0, and Team SoloMid Evo 2–0. They eventually lost to Counter Logic Gaming EU 1–2 in the fifth round of the losers' bracket.

On June 30, 2012, Orbit Gaming competed in the Leaguepedia North American Invitational. They finished the two-day online tournament in first place, most notably defeating Curse Gaming 2–1 in the quarterfinals and sweeping Team Dynamic 2–0 in the finals. On August 26, Orbit took fourth place at the 2012 MLG Summer Championship, losing to Dynamic 1–2 in the third-place match. This led to a tie with Monomaniac Ferus for eighth place in the North American Season Two Circuit Rankings. To decide the last spot for Season Two Regional Finals Seattle, a best-of-three tiebreak match was held. Orbit lost 0–2 to mMe and was denied a spot at the North American Regionals.

=== Cloud9 ===
==== 2013 season ====
Competing under the name Team NomNom and then Cloud9, Nientonsoh, Hai, Yazuki, WildTurtle, and LemonNation secured a spot in the Season 3 North American Offline Qualifier for the inaugural split of the League of Legends Championship Series. However, Cloud9 were knocked out in the group stage after losing to Team MRN and Azure Gaming.

Initially, Nientonsoh said that Cloud9 would disband in light of the loss. The team later decided to stay together, although Nientonsoh and Yazuki left the team and a roster change ensued. Hai shifted from jungle to mid, and new junglers and top laners were actively being tried out in online competitions. The final roster of Balls, Meteos, Hai, Sneaky, and LemonNation set out to qualify for the NA LCS.

==== 2014 season ====
Hai was hospitalized after suffering a collapsed lung in June, which prevented him from attending All-Star 2014 in Paris. CLG's Link replaced him on the roster. C9 finished 1st in the 2014 Summer LCS.

==== 2015 season ====
Cloud9 finished second in the 2015 NA Spring LCS. In the playoffs, C9 reached the finals, where they were beaten by Team SoloMid. On April 22, 2015, Cloud9 manager and founder Jack Etienne announced that Hai was retiring from competitive League of Legends and leaving the team. This followed a post on the League of Legends subreddit that showed Charlie, the coach of Cloud9, chatting with a streamer about Hai's departure. Hai mainly blamed his wrist injury in his retirement, saying, "I cannot keep up with the amount of Solo Queue games my teammates play and it's not fair to them. At best, my wrist injury would have only allowed me to play for another split and that wasn't even certain." He also stated that team morale was at an all-time low and that his teammates were losing trust in his shot calling and performance as a player. Hai announced his appointment as Chief Gaming Officer of Cloud9. He was replaced on the roster by Nicolaj "Incarnation" Jensen. Hai became a temporary substitute for Cloud9 Tempest in June.

Hai came out of retirement in the middle of the Summer 2015 Split and replaced Meteos as jungler. He helped the team rebound safe from relegations; they failed to qualify for the playoffs after ending the split in 7th place, but due to outstanding championship points from Spring, Cloud9 qualified for the Regional Finals. He helped the team qualify for the 2015 League of Legends World Championship by winning the North American qualifying tournament.

Considered an underdog at Worlds, Cloud9 was placed into Group B along with Fnatic, ahq, and Invictus Gaming and expected to place last. Instead, they achieved an undefeated 3-0 the first week. In the second week, Cloud9 needed only one win to advance to the quarterfinals but instead lost four games in a row, including a tiebreaker loss to ahq. They placed third in their group, ahead of only Invictus Gaming. On the final day of Group Stages, Hai made an obscene gesture towards an opponent who predicted Cloud9 would lose. As a result, Hai was fined €500 as he was expected to behave professionally.

==== 2016 season ====
In the 2016 Spring Split, Hai was replaced in the jungle by former Team Impulse jungler Yoon-Jae "Rush" Lee, and shared the role of support with former Gravity support Michael "BunnyFuFuu" Kurlyo. Hai trained BunnyFuFuu to become Cloud9's main shotcaller during the spring split.

=== Cloud9 Challenger ===
For the 2016 Summer Split, Hai moved to Cloud9's North America League of Legends Challenger Series (NA CS) team. Cloud9 Challenger made it past the NA CS promotion tournament to clinch a spot for the 2017 LCS Spring Split, although Cloud9 had to sell the spot, as one organization could not have more than one team in the league.

=== FlyQuest ===
Before the start of the 2017 LCS season, the Cloud 9 Challenger roster, including Hai in the mid lane, was purchased by Wesley Edens and rebranded as FlyQuest.

=== Golden Guardians ===
Hai signed with the Golden Guardians in ahead of the 2018 LCS season. In April 2018, he announced his retirement.

== Tournament results ==
- 9–11th — 2015 League of Legends World Championship
- 3rd — 2016 NA LCS Summer regular season
- 1st — 2016 NA Challenger Series Summer playoffs
- 2nd — 2016 NA LCS Summer playoffs
