= Svenskeren =

Danish esports player

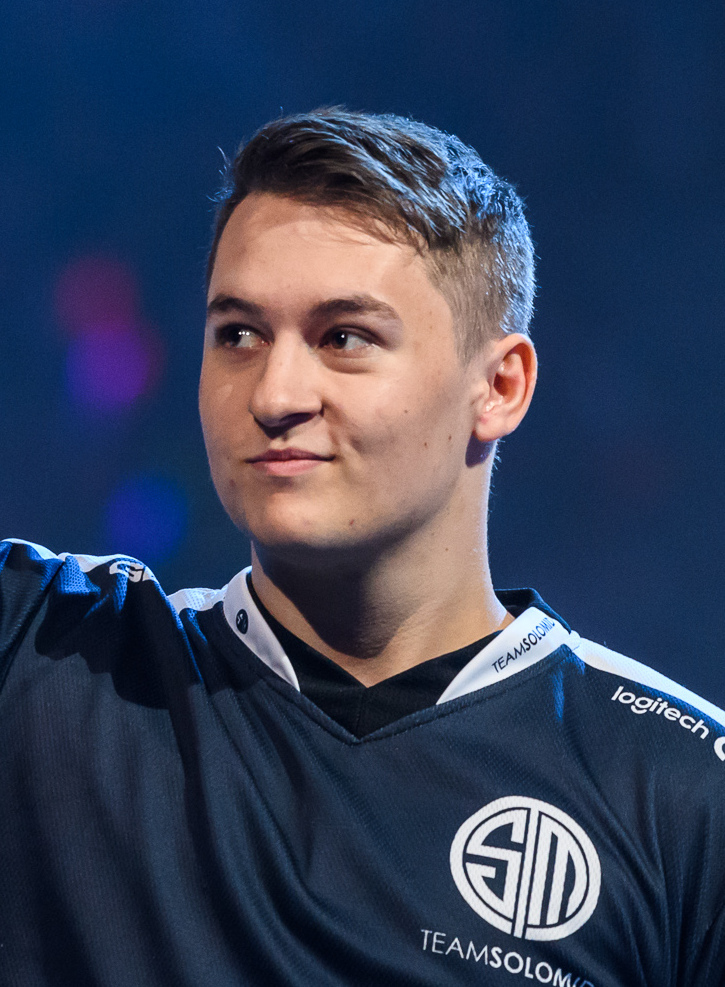
- Johnsen in 2016

Personal information
- Name: Dennis Johnsen
- Born: January 2, 1996 (age 30)
- Nationality: Danish

Career information
- Games: League of Legends
- Playing career: 2011–2022
- Role: Jungler

Team history
- 2011: LoLLeague
- 2011: 3DMAX
- 2011: Leethuanyan
- 2011: Team Mistral
- 2012–2013: Copenhagen Wolves
- 2013: Ninjas in Pyjamas
- 2013: Supa Hot Crew
- 2013–2015: SK Gaming
- 2015–2017: Team SoloMid
- 2017–2019: Cloud9
- 2019–2022: Evil Geniuses

Dennis Johnsen (born January 2, 1996), better known as Svenskeren (pronounced [ˈsvenskɐn]; Danish for 'the Swede'), is a Danish former professional League of Legends player. He has played for SK Gaming, Supa Hot Crew, Ninjas in Pyjamas, Copenhagen Wolves, Team SoloMid, Cloud9, and Evil Geniuses.

During the 2014 League of Legends World Championship group stage in Taiwan, Svenskeren registered an account by the name TaipeiChingChong on the Garena servers and was subsequently fined and suspended by Riot Games for racism. The incident was also criticized by the Taiwanese version of the newspaper Apple Daily. SK Gaming ultimately finished 9–11th.

TSM was involved in a dispute with H2k-Gaming over Svenskeren's contract as both sides claimed they had signed him first. Eventually he signed with TSM, replacing Lucas "Santorin" Larsen as their jungler. At his first tournament with the team, they finished 3rd-4th at Intel Extreme Masters Season X - San Jose.

== Personal life ==
Johnsen was born on January 2, 1996, and grew up in Denmark.

== Career ==
=== Season 1 (2011) ===
Svenskeren started his competitive League of Legends career with LoLLeague (known today as SK Gaming), before he joined 3DMAX. After a few gaming scrims, he eventually left and joined Leethuanyan's roster, which was also picked up by Team Mistral soon after. They managed to place 3rd at the Kings of Europe tournament, however, just before the third-place match, Svenskeren was replaced by Kottenx, leaving him team-less at the end of the season.

=== Season 2 (2012) ===
After taking the majority of his down time away from the competitive scene, Svenskeren was picked up by the Copenhagen Wolves near the end of season two. His debut with the wolves took place at the DreamHack Winter 2012 tournament, where they went on undefeated, only losing to CLG Europe in the semifinals. He and the team also competed at the THOR Open 2012, coming in 2nd behind Fnatic. Svenskeren and the team followed up these tournaments with more success, placing 1st at NorthCon eSport Arena 2012 and in the Eclypsia Christmas Cup.

=== Season 3 (2013) ===
Svenskeren moved around throughout this season from the Copenhagen Wolves, in the spring split to joining Ninjas in Pyjamas in the summer split. Towards the end of Season 3, Svenskeren went on to join SK Gaming, where they lost to his former team, the Copenhagen Wolves, in the first round of the amateur tournament at IEM Cologne.

=== Season 4 (2014) ===
Svenskeren performed well in the fresh SK Gaming roster in the Spring split. Adjustments in playstyle allowed for improvements in SK's results as they placed 3rd, securing them a spot in the spring playoffs. They placed 2nd, losing to Fnatic in the finals. In the Summer split, SK placed 4th in the regular summer split and subsequently 3rd, in the playoffs. They qualified for Worlds after defeating Team ROCCAT in the 3rd place match.

On September 17, 2014, Svenskeren was fined up to $2,500 and was suspended from competing at worlds with SK for violating the World Championship Event rules by using racially insensitive language while interacting with players in Taiwan. Svenskeren had registered an account by the name TaipeiChingChong on the Garena servers and was subsequently fined and suspended by Riot Games. The incident was also criticized by the Taiwanese version of the newspaper Apple Daily.

=== Season 5 (2015) ===
In response to poor behavior, Svenskeren honed in on his gaming capabilities, helping SK finish 1st in the Spring split. However, they finished 9th in the Summer split, after the exhaustive IEM Season IX - World Championship, where SK Gaming lost in the 2nd round of the winners bracket against the GE Tigers. Consequently, SK's lack in results resulted in the team's disbandment as they lost their place in the EU LCS at the end of the 2015 season.

=== Season 6 (2016) ===
In the 2016 preseason, Svenskeren had the choices to join either NA's TSM or EU's H2k. After initially turning down TSM's offer, Svenskeren was set to join H2k, however, the founder of TSM, Reginald, personally offered him a starting spot on the roster, and Svenskeren accepted. This created tensions between the teams as H2k claimed the transfer to be illegal due to having Svenskeren's agreement to join H2k in paper. TSM eventually won both Spring and Summer titles, ensuring their second NA LCS title in a row.

=== Season 7 (2017) ===
On TSM, Svenskeren assisted the team in finishing 1st with a 15–3 record in the regular spring split. Following in the spring playoffs, TSM defeated Cloud9, 3–2 in a close series, winning Svenskeren and TSM the 2017 Spring LCS title. This qualified them for the 2017 Mid-Season Invitational, however, TSM failed to live up to the occasion and placed 5th, with a record of 4–6. Following this performance loss, Doublelift was added, in place of WildTurtle for the 2017 Summer Split. They finished 1st again with a 14–4 record in the regular summer split and subsequently defeated Immortals, 3–1 in the summer playoffs, qualifying TSM for the 2017 World Championship. This cemented history as TSM was the first team in NA LCS history to ever achieve three titles in a row. After a poor performance at Worlds, Svenskeren left TSM in November and joined Cloud9.

=== Season 8 (2018) ===
One of Svenskeren's most pivoting seasons in his League of Legends career was in the 2018 season. Specifically, Cloud9 added Licorice and Svenskeren for the 2018 Spring Season. They placed 5th overall despite holding the 2nd place title for the majority of the season. In the 2018 Summer season, Cloud9 added Goldenglue, Keith and Zeyzal to their roster and brought back Jensen and Sneaky into the main roster. Due to poor performance, in these season splits, Svenskeren was moved to Cloud9 Academy while bringing Blaber in as the new roster for the remainder of the 2018 Summer Season. This likely foreshadowed his transition into Evil Geniuses as he remained a Jungle Substitute.

== Seasons overview ==
Team	Year	Domestic			Mid-Season Invitational	World Championship
Team	Year	League	Spring	Summer	Mid-Season Invitational	World Championship
Copenhagen Wolves	2013	EU LCS	5th–6th	—N/a	—N/a	—N/a
Ninjas in Pyjamas (Sub.)	2013	EU LCS	—N/a	6th	—N/a	Did not qualify
SK Gaming	2014	EU LCS	2nd	3rd	—N/a	9th–11th
SK Gaming	2015	EU LCS	4th	9th	Did not qualify	Did not qualify
Team SoloMid	2016	NA LCS	2nd	1st	Did not qualify	9th–12th
Team SoloMid	2017	NA LCS	1st	1st	5th	9th–11th
Cloud9	2018	NA LCS	5th–6th	2nd	Did not qualify	3rd–4th
Cloud9	2019	LCS	3rd–4th	2nd	Did not qualify	9th–12th
Evil Geniuses	2020	LCS	3rd	5th–6th	Did not qualify	Did not qualify
Evil Geniuses	2021	LCS	5th–6th	5th–6th	Did not qualify	Did not qualify
Cloud9 (Sub.)	2022	LCS	4th	—N/a	Did not qualify	—N/a
TSM Challengers	2023	NA CS	9th–12th	—N/a	—N/a	—N/a
