= Dark Passage (esports) =

Turkish esports team

- Short name: DP
- Divisions: League of Legends; Fortnite Battle Royale; Hearthstone; PlayerUnknown's Battlegrounds
- Founded: 2003
- Based in: Istanbul, Turkey
- CEO: Ertuğ "venza" Okçuoğlu
- Partners: ASUS; SteelSeries; Turkcell; Twitch

Dark Passage is a Turkish professional esports organization with players competing in League of Legends, Fortnite Battle Royale, Hearthstone, and PlayerUnknown's Battlegrounds. It is the oldest esports organization in Turkey, having been originally established in 2003 as a Counter-Strike team.

Dark Passage's League of Legends team competes in the Turkish Championship League (TCL), the top level of professional League of Legends in Turkey. In 2014, the team qualified for that year's World Championship after winning IWCT Gamescom 2014.

== League of Legends ==
Dark Passage
- Short name: DP
- Game: League of Legends
- Founded: 2012
- League: Turkish Championship League
- Head coach: Canberk "Coosone" Büyükyolaçan, Eray "Tasdin" Yıldırım

From 2013 to 2014, Dark Passage dominated the competitive League of Legends scene in Turkey. The team won all three seasons of the Riot Games Turkey Tournament in 2013, as well as that year's championship tournament. They also won all three seasons of the Turkish Championship League (TCL) in 2014. After winning the 2014 Riot Games Turkish Championship, Dark Passage qualified for the International Wild Card Tournament (IWCT), where they defeated Australian team Legacy Esports 3–0 to qualify for the 2014 World Championship.

For the 2014 World Championship group stage, Dark Passage was placed in Group A, along with Korean team Samsung Galaxy White, Chinese team Edward Gaming, and Taiwanese team ahq e-Sports Club. The team finished last in Group A and 14th–16th overall, failing to win a single game and ending with a 0–6 record.

== Rosters ==
=== League of Legends ===
Nat.	ID	Name	Role
(South Korea)	Zest	Kim Dong-min	Top Laner
(Turkey)	CHEF	Ali Durgut	Jungler
(Sweden)	Backlund	Jonathan Bäcklund	Mid Laner
(Turkey)	Ruep	İlker Bilen	Bot Laner
(South Korea)	Patch	Han Seung-min	Support

=== Fortnite Battle Royale ===
Nat.	ID	Name	Role
(Turkey)	Chuf	Enes Çifci	Captain
(Turkey)	Jack	Alican Eyüboğlu	Player
(Turkey)	Rawl	Mert Şerefli	Player

=== PlayerUnknown's Battlegrounds ===
- (Turkey) Antodalt
- (European Union) Apocalyp
- (Turkey) schzA
- (Turkey) Wreckage35
