= Meteos (gamer) =

American professional League of Legends player

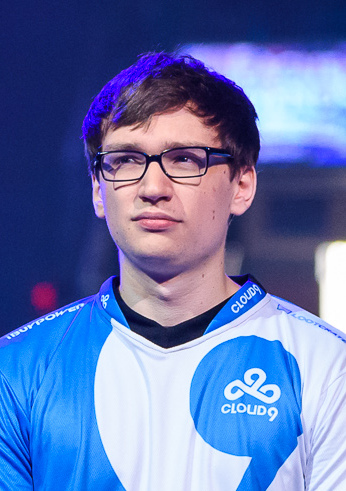
- Meteos in 2016

Personal information
- Name: William Hartman
- Born: June 13, 1993 (age 33)
- Nationality: American

Career information
- Games: League of Legends
- Playing career: 2012–2020
- Role: Jungler

Team history
- 2012–2013: Team Normal Stars
- 2013: compLexity Gaming
- 2013–2017: Cloud9 (Note: Briefly rebranded to Quantic Gaming in early 2013)
- 2017: Phoenix1
- 2017–2018: 100 Thieves
- 2018: FlyQuest
- 2018–2019: OpTic Gaming
- 2019–2020: 100 Thieves

Career highlights and awards
- 2× NA LCS champion

William Hartman, better known as Meteos, is an American professional League of Legends player. In the League of Legends Championship Series, Meteos has played for Cloud9, 100 Thieves (twice), OpTic Gaming, and FlyQuest. During his time on Cloud9, Meteos won two NA LCS titles and appeared in every split.

== Career ==
Meteos was introduced to League of Legends by his brother. His first favorite champion was Singed. He played ADC in Season 2, but eventually switched to Jungle in April 2012. He ranked up playing Skarner, a champion that came to be associated with him. He favored Jungle Elise in Season 3.

Meteos played "High Elo" normal games for a long time, earning over 3500 wins. At some point, he and his friends decided to form Team Normal Stars to compete in Go4LoL tournaments. Although they were able to win consistently, they disbanded before the first LCS qualifying games because their top laner was too young to compete. He became friends with WildTurtle, who asked him to be a sub for Cloud9. Since the team hadn't decided on a Jungler, he asked if he could join full-time. Meteos joined Cloud9 in early March after subbing for them in the MLG Rising Stars Invitational and IPL 6 qualifiers.

His original in-game name was "Long Dong" before it was changed to "Short Dog" for being offensive. But after an inactive name sweep, his current account's name became available. "Meteos" was the name he used in WoW for five years—it comes from a Nintendo DS game by the same name that happened to be on his desk at the time he created his WoW account.

On July 3, 2015, Meteos announced that he was stepping down as Cloud9's main jungler and shot caller. Following the announcement, Hai came out of retirement to fill in during the Summer Split Week 6. Meteos extended his thanks for the concern from the community — many wondered if he had a family/health emergency because of some ambiguously worded updates on social media. Meteos said that the team was not playing at its best with him as the shotcaller; he thought that if he stepped back for the rest of the split to let someone else jungle, C9 might avoid relegation. Jack Etienne, the general manager of Cloud9 said, "Meteos is a huge part of Cloud9 and one of the most talented players on our roster." Meteos is still actively involved in the C9 brand and will even sub for the new jungler as needed.

On May 9, 2016, it was announced he would return to the active C9 roster as Jungler.

Meteos returned to Cloud9 during the 2016 Summer Split as their starting jungler. Playing very well and with help of new members of the team such as C9 Impact and C9 smoothie, Cloud9 was able to secure a play off spot and making it all the way to the finals eventually losing to TSM. Making it through the gauntlet and defeating Immortals 3–1. Cloud 9 was able to qualify for worlds once again.

Following a Worlds quarterfinals finish with a 0–3 loss to Samsung Galaxy, Meteos once again announced his departure from the main Cloud9 lineup, moving into the substitute position, with the intent to stream full-time again. He was replaced by rookie jungler Contractz.

On November 23, 2017, Meteos, alongside Kim "Ssumday" Chan-ho and Yoo "Ryu" Sang-wook, joined 100 Thieves as their starting Jungler for the team's inaugural Spring 2018 season. His team recorded a 1st-place finish in the Spring 2018 split, but they lost 3–0 in the Playoff Finals to Team Liquid.

For the summer split of 2018, however, Meteos was traded to FlyQuest after requests to be traded, citing lack of chemistry and conflict with the coach, Neil "pr0lly" Hammad. He found some success in the Summer Split of 2018 with FlyQuest, making it to the Summer Playoffs, but was swept 3-0 by his former team, 100 Thieves.

== Tournament results ==
2013–2015
| Date | Event | Placing | Final game | | |
|---|---|---|---|---|---|
| 2013 | 2013 Summer NA LCS playoffs | (gold) 1st | 1 | Cloud9–? | Team SoloMid |
| 2013 | Season 3 World Championship | | Cloud9 | ?–? | ? |
| 2015 | 2015 League of Legends World Championship | | Cloud9 | ?–? | ? |
| 2016 | 2016 Summer NA LCS playoffs | (bronze) 3rd | ? | Cloud9–? | ? |
