= LemonNation =

American professional esports player

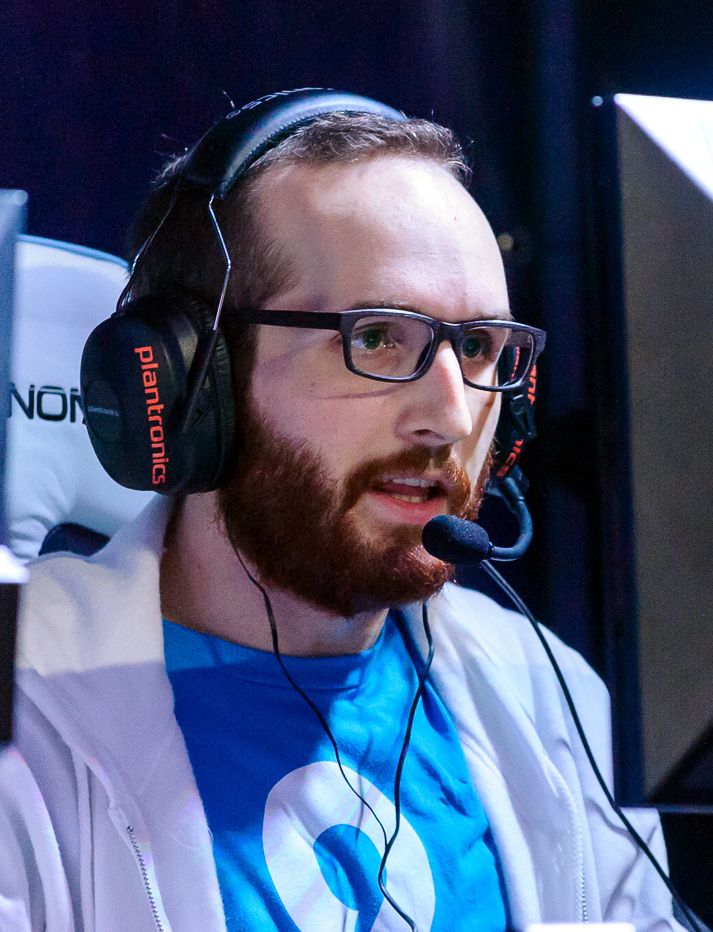
- Hart in 2014

Personal information
- Name: Daerek Hart
- Born: June 15, 1989 (age 37)
- Nationality: American

Career information
- Game: League of Legends
- Playing career: 2012–2018
- Role: Support

Team history
- 2012: Orbit Gaming
- 2012: Quantic Gaming
- 2013–2016: Cloud9 (Note: Briefly rebranded to Quantic Gaming in early 2013.)
- 2016: Cloud9 Challenger
- 2017: FlyQuest
- 2018: OpTic Gaming

Daerek Hart, better known as LemonNation, is a League of Legends player, formerly the support for OpTic Gaming of the NA LCS (NA LCS). During his time on Cloud9, Hart played the support role, winning the North American League of Legends Championship Series split titles and appeared in three consecutive League of Legends World Championships.

Hart retired from competitive play on October 24, 2015, and became C9's coach. Hart was replaced as support by Hai "Hai" Lam, who switched over from the jungle position. After retirement Hart was announced for the roster of Cloud9 Challenger, C9's League of Legends Challenger Series (CS) team.

== Career ==
2012 Season

Hart was picked up after gaining notoriety in the League of Legends scene for reaching rank 1 in solo queue playing only support. He was invited to play for the team HOODSTOMPGRAVESGG and was soon after acquired by Orbit Gaming in April 2012. Afterward, they left Orbit Gaming and were acquired by Quantic Gaming. After leaving this brand, Hart and his team went on to compete as Cloud 9.

2013 Season

Hart and a newly reformed Cloud 9 team went on to have a strong performance in the LCS Summer Split, ending with a victory against TSM 3–0 in the playoff finals.

2015 Season

Hart and Cloud 9 suffered a rough patch during this season, losing many of their games in Hai's absence from the team. After the return of Hai, however, they managed to improve their record and place a spot in the World Championship. In the championship, they were undefeated in their seed in the first week but went on to lose four games in a row to advance to the quarter-finals, placing third in their group.

2016 Season

Hart announced his intended retirement. He retired briefly, but then reentered the scene in 2017.

2017 Season

Hart and Cloud 9 Challenger were purchased and re-branded into FlyQuest. They finished 5th place with a 9–9 record. In the playoffs, they finished 4th overall. At the end of the Summer Season, they finished 7th overall in the regular season, and Hart left the team to join OpTic Gaming.

== Tournament results ==
=== Cloud9 ===
- 1st — 2013 Summer NA LCS
- 2nd — 2014 Summer NA LCS playoffs

=== Cloud9 Challenger ===
- Qualified for NA LCS Spring Split 2017
