= Intel Extreme Masters Season IX – World Championship =

Intel Extreme Masters Season IX
Tournament information
- Sport: Starcraft II
- Location: Katowice, Silesian Voivodeship, Poland
- Dates: December 12, 2014–March 15, 2015

Final positions
- Champion: Joo "Zest" Sung Wook

Tournament statistics
- Sponsors: Intel, BenQ, Kingston HyperX, GIGABYTE, ROCCAT

Intel Extreme Masters Season IX
Tournament information
- Sport: League of Legends
- Location: Katowice, Silesian Voivodeship, Poland
- Dates: December 12, 2014–March 15, 2015

Final positions
- Champions: Team SoloMid

Intel Extreme Masters Season IX – World Championship Katowice, also known as IEM Season IX World Championship took place in 2015. Intel Extreme Masters World Championship was held in Katowice, Silesian Voivodeship, Poland from March 12 to March 15, 2015. The World Championship has sanctioned official events include events of Starcraft II and League of Legends. It was the final event of Intel Extreme Masters Season IX.

== World Championship – Katowice ==
=== StarCraft II ===
Protoss (5)	Terran (7)	Zerg (4)
IEM Season IX: Shenzhen (2)
-	TaeJa (Team Liquid)	Solar (Samsung Galaxy)
IEM Season IX: Toronto (2)
Zest (KT Rolster)	Flash (KT Rolster)	-
IEM Season IX: San Jose (2)
herO (CJ Entus)	-	-
Rain (mYinsanity)	-	-
IEM Season IX: Taipei (2)
-	Maru (Green Wings)	Life (KT Rolster)
Online qualifiers (8)
Trap (Green Wings)	BByong (CJ Entus)	Dark (SK Telecom T1)
Patience (Dead Pixels)	INnoVation (SK Telecom T1)	Hydra (ROOT Gaming)
-	FanTaSy (Dead Pixels)	-
-	Cure (Green Wings)	-

== Results ==
=== StarCraft II ===
Place	Player	Prize money
1st	(South Korea) Zest	$66,707
2nd	(South Korea) Trap	$15,000
3rd–4th	(South Korea) BByong	$7,500
3rd–4th	(South Korea) Dark	$7,500
5–8th	(South Korea) FanTaSy	$3,000
5–8th	(South Korea) herO	$3,000
5–8th	(South Korea) INnoVation	$3,000
5–8th	(South Korea) Maru	$3,000
9–16th	(South Korea) Cure	$1,000
9–16th	(South Korea) Flash	$1,000
9–16th	(South Korea) Hydra	$1,000
9–16th	(South Korea) Life	$1,000
9–16th	(South Korea) Patience	$1,000
9–16th	(South Korea) Rain	$1,000
9–16th	(South Korea) Solar	$1,000
9–16th	(South Korea) TaeJa	$1,000

Source: Intel Extreme Masters

Round of 16
(South Korea) herO	3
(South Korea) Cure	1
(South Korea) BByong	3
(South Korea) Solar	1
(South Korea) Zest	3
(South Korea) Hydra	2
(South Korea) INnoVation	3
(South Korea) Life	2
(South Korea) Flash	2
(South Korea) Trap	3
(South Korea) FanTaSy	3
(South Korea) Rain	0
(South Korea) Maru	3
(South Korea) Patience	0
(South Korea) Dark	3
(South Korea) TaeJa	1

Quarter-finals
(South Korea) herO	1
(South Korea) BByong	3
(South Korea) Zest	3
(South Korea) INnoVation	2
(South Korea) Trap	3
(South Korea) FanTaSy	2
(South Korea) Maru	0
(South Korea) Dark	3

Semi-finals
(South Korea) BByong	1
(South Korea) Zest	3
(South Korea) Trap	3
(South Korea) Dark	1

Final
(South Korea) Zest	4
(South Korea) Trap	1
Third place
(South Korea) BByong	-
(South Korea) Dark	-

=== League of Legends ===
Place	Team	Prize money
1st	Team SoloMid	$108,414
2nd	Team WE	$30,000
3rd–4th	GE Tigers	$15,000
3rd–4th	yoe Flash Wolves	$15,000
5–6th	CJ Entus	$5,000
5–6th	SK Gaming	$5,000
7–8th	Cloud9	$2,500
7–8th	Gambit Gaming	$2,500
