= Lee Shin-hyung =

Korean football player

Personal information
- Date of birth: 2 March 2001 (age 25)
- Place of birth: Seoul, South Korea
- Height: 1.74 m (5 ft 9 in)
- Position: Forward

Team information
- Current team: Waldhof Mannheim II
- Number: 34

Youth career
- 2017: 1. FC Kaiserslautern
- 2018–2020: Astoria Walldorf
- 2020–2021: Waldhof Mannheim

Senior career*
Years	Team	Apps	(Gls)
2020–	Waldhof Mannheim II	39	(7)
2021	Waldhof Mannheim	2	(0)
- * Club domestic league appearances and goals as of 20 November 2022

Lee Shin-hyung (born 2 March 2001) is a professional footballer who plays as a forward for Verbandsliga Nordbaden club Waldhof Mannheim II.

== Career ==
After playing youth football for 1. FC Kaiserslautern and Astoria Walldorf, Lee made his professional debut for Waldhof Mannheim on 14 March 2021 in a 1–0 defeat at home to SV Meppen.
