= Team Vulcun =

American League of Legends team

- Short name: VUL
- Game: League of Legends
- Founded: February 2, 2013
- Folded: October 16, 2013
- League: North American League of Legends Championship Series (NA LCS)
- Team history: Team FeaR (2012–2013)
- Location: United States
- Head coach: Kenneth "Kenma" Buechter
- Manager: Christina "Gnomesayin" Laird

Team Vulcun was a professional League of Legends team that competed in the North American League of Legends Championship Series (NA LCS). The team was formed on February 2, 2013, after it acquired the roster of Team FeaR.

Team Vulcun finished 3rd in the 2013 NA LCS Spring Split and again in the 2013 NA LCS Summer Split. The latter placement qualified them for the 2013 World Championship, where they placed 4th in Group B and 11th–12th overall.

On October 16, 2013, it was announced that Team Vulcun would rename to XDG Gaming. Around a year later, the organization completely dissolved.

== Final roster ==
| Nat. | ID | Name | Role |
|---|---|---|---|
| (United States) | Sycho Sid | Benny Hung | Top Laner |
| (United States) | Xmithie | Jake Puchero | Jungler |
| (United States) | mandatorycloud | Zachary Hoschar | Mid Laner |
| (United States) | Zuna | Christopher Buechter | Bot Laner |
| (United States) | BloodWater | Lyubomir Spasov | Support |
