= 2014 League of Legends World Championship =

Esports tournament, held in Asia

League of Legends World Championship
- 2014

Tournament information
- Location: Taiwan; Singapore; South Korea
- Dates: September 18–October 19
- Administrator: Riot Games
- Tournament format(s): 16 team round-robin group stage 8 team single-elimination bracket
- Venues: 5 (in 4 host cities): National Taiwan University Sports Center (Taipei, Group Stage A & B); Singapore EXPO (Singapore, Group Stage C & D); Busan Exhibition and Convention Center (Busan, Quarterfinals); Olympic Gymnastics Arena (Seoul, Semifinals); Seoul World Cup Stadium (Seoul, Finals)
- Teams: 16
- Purse: $2,130,000

Final positions
- Champions: Samsung Galaxy White
- Runner-up: Star Horn Royal Club

Tournament statistics
- Matches played: 78
- Attendance: 40,000+ (final)
- MVP: Cho "Mata" Se-hyeong (Samsung Galaxy White)

The 2014 League of Legends World Championship was an esports tournament held from September 18 to October 19, 2014, for the multiplayer online battle arena video game League of Legends. It was the fourth iteration of the League of Legends World Championship, an annual international tournament organized by the game's developer, Riot Games. Matches were held in Taipei, Singapore, Busan, and Seoul, with grand finals being at the Seoul World Cup Stadium in Seoul, South Korea. The 16 teams qualified by either winning a major professional league or a regional qualifying tournament. There was a 16 team round-robin group stage followed by an 8 team single elimination bracket. The games were officially streamed on Twitch and Azubu in several languages and the finals were aired online on ESPN3.

The group stage began on September 18 in Taipei at the National Taiwan University Sports Center and concluded on September 28 in Singapore at the Singapore EXPO with eight teams advancing to the bracket stage. The bracket stage started on October 3 in Busan, South Korea at the Busan Exhibition and Convention Center, and concluded on October 19 with the grand finals hosted at the 45,000-seats Seoul World Cup Stadium, where South Korean team Samsung Galaxy White beat the Chinese team Star Horn Royal Club to become the 2014 League of Legends world champions.

American band Imagine Dragons contributed the theme song "Warriors" for the tournament, and performed live on the grand finals stage in South Korea. All games were made available for free via live streaming.

The 2014 World Championship games were streamed live by 40 broadcast partners, and cast in 19 languages. The grand finals were watched by 27 million people, with concurrent viewership peaking at over 11 million viewers.

== Teams ==
The following teams qualified to participate in the tournament's group stage:

| Region | | League | | Path | Team | ID | Pool |
|---|---|---|---|---|---|---|---|
| South Korea | | The Champions | | Most Circuit Points #1 | Samsung Galaxy Blue | SSB | 1 |
| South Korea | | The Champions | | Most Circuit Points #2 | Samsung Galaxy White | SSW | 2 |
| South Korea | | The Champions | | Regional Finals Winner | NaJin White Shield | NWS | 2 |
| China | | LPL | | Regional Finals Winner #1 | EDward Gaming | EDG | 1 |
| China | | LPL | | Regional Finals Winner #2 | Star Horn Royal Club | SHR | 2 |
| China | | LPL | | Regional Finals Winner #3 | OMG | OMG | 2 |
| Europe | | EU LCS | | Summer Champion | Alliance | ALL | 1 |
| Europe | | EU LCS | | Summer Runner-up | Fnatic | FNC | 2 |
| Europe | | EU LCS | | Summer Third-place | SK Gaming | SK | 3 |
| North America | | NA LCS | | Summer Champion | Team SoloMid | TSM | 1 |
| North America | | NA LCS | | Summer Runner-up | Cloud9 | C9 | 2 |
| North America | | NA LCS | | Summer Third-place | LMQ | LMQ | 3 |
| TW/HK/MO & SEA | | GPL | | Summer Champion | Taipei Assassins | TPA | 2 |
| TW/HK/MO & SEA | | GPL | | Regional Finals Winner | ahq e-Sports Club | AHQ | 2 |
| Wildcard | Brazil | CBLoL | IWCT | CBLol Regional Finals Winner ►IWCT PAX 2014 Winner | KaBuM! e-Sports | KBM | 3 |
| Wildcard | Turkey | TCL | IWCT | TCL Regional Finals Winner ►IWCT Gamescom 2014 Winner | Dark Passage | DP | 3 |

== Venues ==
Taipei, Singapore, Busan and Seoul were the 4 venues chosen to host the competition.

| Taipei, Taiwan | Singapore | South Korea | | |
| Taipei, Taiwan | Singapore | Busan | Seoul | |
|---|---|---|---|---|
| Group Stage A and B | Group Stage C and D | Quarterfinals | Semifinals | Finals |
| National Taiwan University Sports Center | Singapore EXPO | BEXCO Center | Olympic Gymnastics Arena | Seoul World Cup Stadium |
| Capacity: 4,200 | Capacity: 16,000 | Capacity: 4,002 | Capacity: 15,000 | Capacity: 66,704 |
| 2014 League of Legends World Championship is located in Taiwan | 2014 League of Legends World Championship is located in Singapore | 2014 League of Legends World Championship is located in South Korea | | |

== Group stage ==
The group stage was played in a best of one double round-robin format, with the top two teams from each of the four groups advancing to the knockout stage, for a total of eight teams.

Group A

| Pos | Team | Pld | W | L | PCT | Qualification |
|---|---|---|---|---|---|---|
| 1 | Samsung White | 6 | 6 | 0 | 1.000 | Advance to knockouts |
| 2 | Edward Gaming | 7 | 4 | 3 | .571 | Advance to knockouts |
| 3 | Ahq e-Sports Club | 7 | 3 | 4 | .429 | |
| 4 | Dark Passage | 6 | 0 | 6 | .000 | |

Source: LoL Esports (Archived 2014-11-05 at the Wayback Machine)

Group B

| Pos | Team | Pld | W | L | PCT | Qualification |
|---|---|---|---|---|---|---|
| 1 | Star Horn Royal Club | 6 | 5 | 1 | .833 | Advance to knockouts |
| 2 | Team SoloMid | 6 | 4 | 2 | .667 | Advance to knockouts |
| 3 | SK Gaming | 6 | 2 | 4 | .333 | |
| 4 | Taipei Assassins | 6 | 1 | 5 | .167 | |

Source: LoL Esports (Archived 2014-11-05 at the Wayback Machine)

Group C

| Pos | Team | Pld | W | L | PCT | Qualification |
|---|---|---|---|---|---|---|
| 1 | Samsung Blue | 6 | 5 | 1 | .833 | Advance to knockouts |
| 2 | OMG | 6 | 3 | 3 | .500 | Advance to knockouts |
| 3 | LMQ | 6 | 2 | 4 | .333 | |
| 4 | Fnatic | 6 | 2 | 4 | .333 | |

Source: LoL Esports (Archived 2014-11-05 at the Wayback Machine)

Group D

| Pos | Team | Pld | W | L | PCT | Qualification |
|---|---|---|---|---|---|---|
| 1 | NaJin White Shield | 7 | 5 | 2 | .714 | Advance to knockouts |
| 2 | Cloud9 | 7 | 4 | 3 | .571 | Advance to knockouts |
| 3 | Alliance | 6 | 3 | 3 | .500 | |
| 4 | KaBuM e-Sports | 6 | 1 | 5 | .167 | |

Source: LoL Esports (Archived 2014-11-05 at the Wayback Machine)

== Knockout stage ==
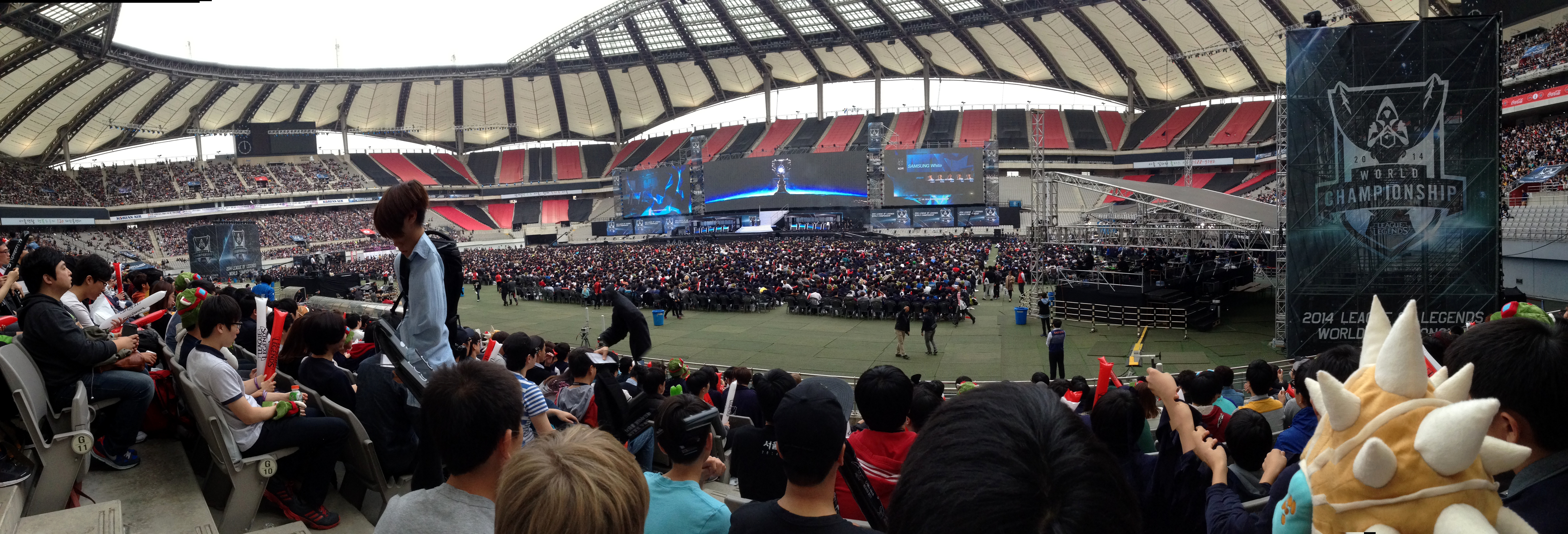
Seoul World Cup Stadium for the finals

Quarterfinals; BEXCO
October 3
Team SoloMid | 1
Samsung Galaxy White | 3
October 4
Cloud9 | 1
Samsung Galaxy Blue | 3
October 5
Star Horn Royal Club | 3
EDward Gaming | 2
October 6
NaJin White Shield | 0
OMG | 3

Semifinals; Olympic Gymnastics Arena
October 11
Samsung Galaxy White | 3
Samsung Galaxy Blue | 0
October 12
Star Horn Royal Club | 3
OMG | 2

Final; Seoul World Cup Stadium
October 19
Samsung Galaxy White | 3
Star Horn Royal Club | 1

Source: LoL Esports (Archived 2014-11-05 at the Wayback Machine)

== Final standings ==
| Place | Team | Prize money |
|---|---|---|
| 1st | Samsung Galaxy White | $1,000,000 |
| 2nd | Star Horn Royal Club | $250,000 |
| 3rd–4th | Oh My God | $150,000 |
| 3rd–4th | Samsung Galaxy Blue | $150,000 |
| 5–8th | Cloud9 | $75,000 |
| 5–8th | EDward Gaming | $75,000 |
| 5–8th | NaJin White Shield | $75,000 |
| 5–8th | Team SoloMid | $75,000 |
| 9–11th | ahq e-Sports Club | $45,000 |
| 9–11th | Alliance | $45,000 |
| 9–11th | SK Gaming | $45,000 |
| 12–13th | Fnatic | $35,000 |
| 12–13th | LMQ | $35,000 |
| 14–16th | Dark Passage | $25,000 |
| 14–16th | KaBuM! e-Sports | $25,000 |
| 14–16th | Taipei Assassins | $25,000 |

== Viewership and attendance ==
Around 40,000 fans attended the grand finals between Samsung White and Star Horn Royal Club. It is estimated that there were 288 million cumulative views throughout the entire tournament.

The 2014 World Championship games were streamed live by 40 broadcast partners, and cast in 19 languages. The grand finals were watched by 27 million people, with concurrent viewership peaking at over 11 million viewers.

=== Racism incident ===
Prior to the World Championship group stage in Taipei, SK Gaming's Dennis "Svenskeren" Johnsen acted in a racially insensitive way while playing on the Taiwanese server, being disrespectful towards other players and naming his account "TaipeiChingChong". Johnsen was fined US$2,500 and was suspended from his team's first three games in the tournament.
