= League of Legends: Season 3 World Championship =

2013 esports tournament

Season 3 World Championship
- 2013

Tournament information
- Location: United States
- Dates: September 15–October 4
- Administrator: Riot Games
- Tournament format(s): 10 team round-robin group stage 8 team single-elimination bracket
- Venue: 3 (in 1 host city)
- Teams: 14
- Purse: $2,050,000

Final positions
- Champions: SK Telecom T1
- Runner-up: Royal Club

Tournament statistics
- Matches played: 63

The Season 3 World Championship was an esports tournament for the multiplayer online battle arena video game League of Legends. It was the third iteration of the League of Legends World Championship held by Riot Games, and the last iteration not to be formally titled after the year it took place.

SK Telecom T1 defeated Royal Club 3–0 in the finals and took their first championship.

== Teams ==
- 14 teams participate
- Four teams receive direct entry into Quarter-finals through top 4 of All-Star Shanghai 2013.
  - Seed #1 from China, South Korea, North America, and Taiwan/Hong Kong/Macau

Region	Path	Team	ID
Starting in the Playoff stage
China	China Regional Finals Winner	Royal Club	RYL
North America	NA LCS Summer Champion	Cloud9	C9
South Korea	The Champion Most Circuit Points #1	NaJin Black Sword	NJS
TW/HK/MO	TW/HK/MO Regional Finals Winner	Gamania Bears	GAB
Starting in the Group stage
China	China Regional Finals Runner-up	Oh My God	OMG
Europe	EU LCS Summer Champion	Fnatic	FNC
Europe	EU LCS Summer Runner-up	Lemondogs	LD
Europe	EU LCS Summer 3rd Place	Gambit Gaming	GMB
North America	NA LCS Summer Runner-up	Team SoloMid	TSM
North America	NA LCS Summer 3rd Place	Team Vulcun	VUL
South Korea	The Champion Most Circuit Points #2	Samsung Ozone	SSO
South Korea	Korea Regional Finals Winner	SK Telecom T1 K	SKT
Southeast Asia	SEA Regional Finals Winner	Mineski	MSK
CIS►Wildcard	Regional CIS Championship ►IWCT Winner	GamingGear.EU	GG

== Venues ==
Culver City and Los Angeles were selected as the host cities for the World Championship.

United States
Culver City	Los Angeles	
Group Stage and Quarterfinals	Semifinals	Finals
Culver Sound Studios	Galen Center	Staples Center
Capacity: 1,500	Capacity: 10,258	Capacity: 20,000
League of Legends: Season 3 World Championship is located in the United States

== Group stage ==
The group stage featured ten teams, which were drawn into two groups of five according to their seeding. Teams from the same region could not be placed in the same group, with the exception of Europe’s third seed, Gambit Gaming. The competition was played in a double round-robin format, with all matches contested as best-of-one. When teams finished with identical win–loss and head-to-head records, a tiebreaker match was held to determine second place. The top two teams from each group advanced to the playoff stage, while the bottom three were eliminated.

Group A

Pos	Team	Pld	W	L	PCT	Qualification
1	Oh My God	8	7	1	.875	Advance to knockouts
2	SK Telecom T1 K	8	7	1	.875	Advance to knockouts
3	Lemondogs	8	3	5	.375	
4	Team SoloMid	8	2	6	.250	
5	GamingGear.eu	8	1	7	.125	

Source: LoL Esports (Archived 2014-10-07 at the Wayback Machine)

Group B

Pos	Team	Pld	W	L	PCT	Qualification
1	Fnatic	8	7	1	.875	Advance to knockouts
2	Gambit Gaming	9	6	3	.667	Advance to knockouts
3	Samsung Ozone	9	5	4	.556	
4	Team Vulcan	8	3	5	.375	
5	Team Mineski	8	0	8	.000	

Source: LoL Esports (Archived 2014-10-07 at the Wayback Machine)

== Playoff stage ==
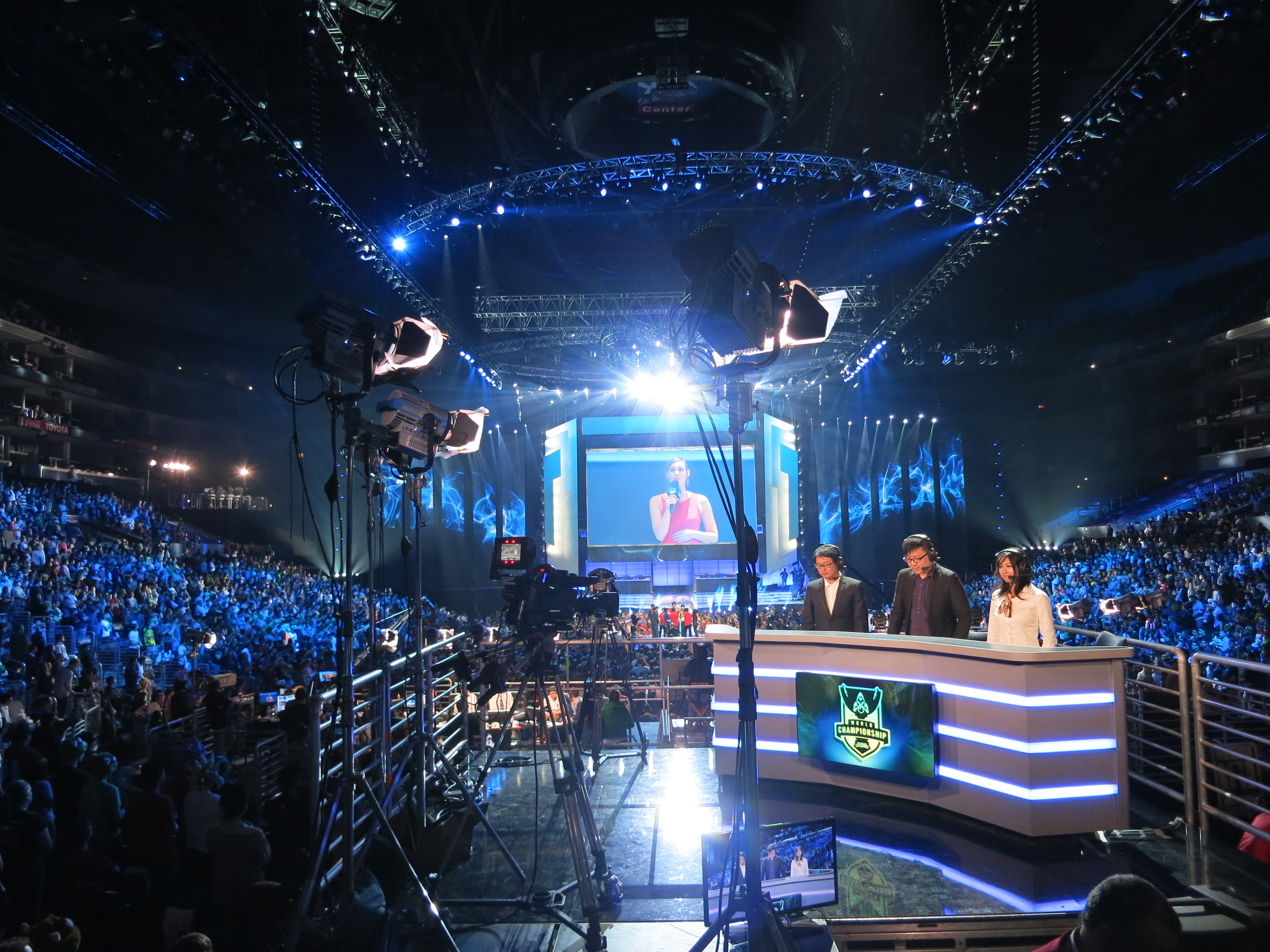
Broadcast desk during the playoffs

The playoff stage consisted of eight teams drawn into a single-elimination bracket. The quarterfinals were played as best-of-three series, while both the semifinals and the final were contested as best-of-five. The auto-qualified team was matched against an opponent from the group stage, and teams that had advanced from the same group were placed on opposite sides of the bracket, ensuring that they could not meet until the final.

Quarterfinals
AQ	Gamania Bears	0
A1	SK Telecom T1 K	2
AQ	NaJin Black Sword	2
B2	Gambit Gaming	1
AQ	Royal Club	2
A1	Oh My God	0
AQ	Cloud9	1
B1	Fnatic	2

Semifinals
SK Telecom T1 K	3
NaJin Black Sword	2
Royal Club	3
Fnatic	1

Final
SK Telecom T1 K	3
Royal Club	0

Source: LoL Esports (Archived 2014-10-07 at the Wayback Machine)

== Final standings ==
=== Team ranking ===
Place	Team	Prize money
1st	SK Telecom T1 K	$1,000,000
2nd	Royal Club	$250,000
3rd–4th	Fnatic	$150,000
3rd–4th	NaJin Black Sword	$150,000
5–8th	Cloud9	$75,000
5–8th	Gamania Bears	$75,000
5–8th	Gambit Gaming	$75,000
5–8th	Oh My God	$75,000
9–10th	Lemondogs	$45,000
9–10th	Samsung Ozone	$45,000
11–12th	Team SoloMid	$30,000
11–12th	Team Vulcun	$30,000
13–14th	GamingGear.EU	$25,000
13–14th	Mineski	$25,000

== Viewership and attendance ==
The 2013 World Championship final was watched over Twitch by over 32 million people, with a peak of 8.5 million concurrent views, a large increase from the 2012 finals of 8.2 million viewers, with 1.1 millions peak concurrent ones. The numbers shattered the previous records for any eSports event. These numbers were much higher than those of other competitor eSports events for Dota 2 and Starcraft 2, the former of which only reached one million concurrent viewers.

Riot's 8.5 million concurrent viewers is on a par with the "more than 8 million" people that watched Felix Baumgartner's jump from the edge of space. Exact figures for streaming events are difficult to ascertain, but All Things D reports that Baumgartner's jump was "web video's biggest event ever."

League of Legends is by far the biggest entity in the pro-gaming sector, regularly outstripping the stream viewer numbers of its major competitors, including Valve's Dota 2 and Blizzard's StarCraft II. In context, Valve's flagship Dota 2 tournament — The International 3 — took place two months before the League of Legends Season 3 World Championship finals and reached one million concurrent viewers.
