= Impact (gamer) =

South Korean League of Legends player

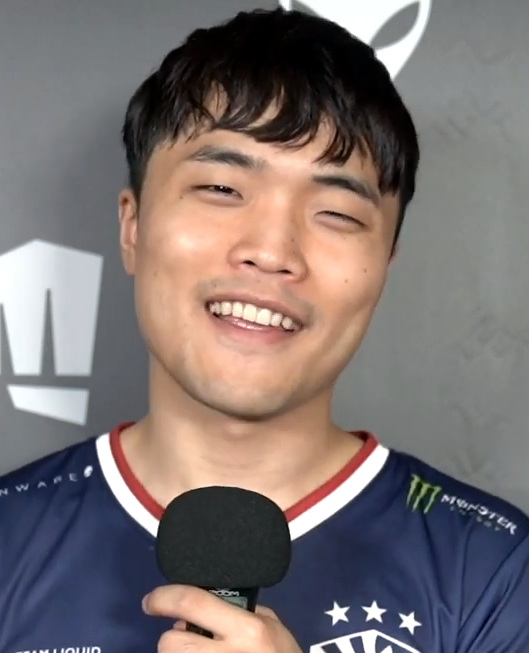
- Impact in 2019

Personal information
- Name: 정언영 (Jeong Eon-yeong)
- Nationality: South Korea

Current team
- Team: Sentinels
- Role: Top laner
- Game: League of Legends
- League: LCS

Team history
- 2012: Xenics Storm
- 2013–2014: SK Telecom T1
- 2015: Team Impulse
- 2016: NRG Esports
- 2016–2017: Cloud9
- 2018–2020: Team Liquid
- 2021–2022: Evil Geniuses
- 2023: FlyQuest
- 2024–2025: Team Liquid
- 2026–present: Sentinels

Career highlights and awards
- World champion (2013); 2× LCK champion; 6× LCS champion; LCS season MVP; 3× LCS All–Pro First Team; LTA champion; Rift Rivals champion (2017); All-Star Invitational champion (2014); NLB champion (2014)

Jeong Eon-yeong (Korean: 정언영), also known as his pseudonym Impact, is a South Korean League of Legends player for Sentinels of the League of Legends Championship Series (LCS). Impact won the Season 3 League of Legends World Championship as a member of SK Telecom T1 K. He played for both Team Impulse and NRG Esports in the LCS, before transferring to Cloud9 in May 2016. Impact left Cloud9 after the 2017 season and joined Team Liquid, where he won four LCS titles before departing the team for Evil Geniuses after the end of the 2020 season.

== Career ==
=== Xenics Storm ===
Impact began his career as a support player for Xenics Storm in 2012, and the team managed to place third in spring.

=== SK Telecom ===
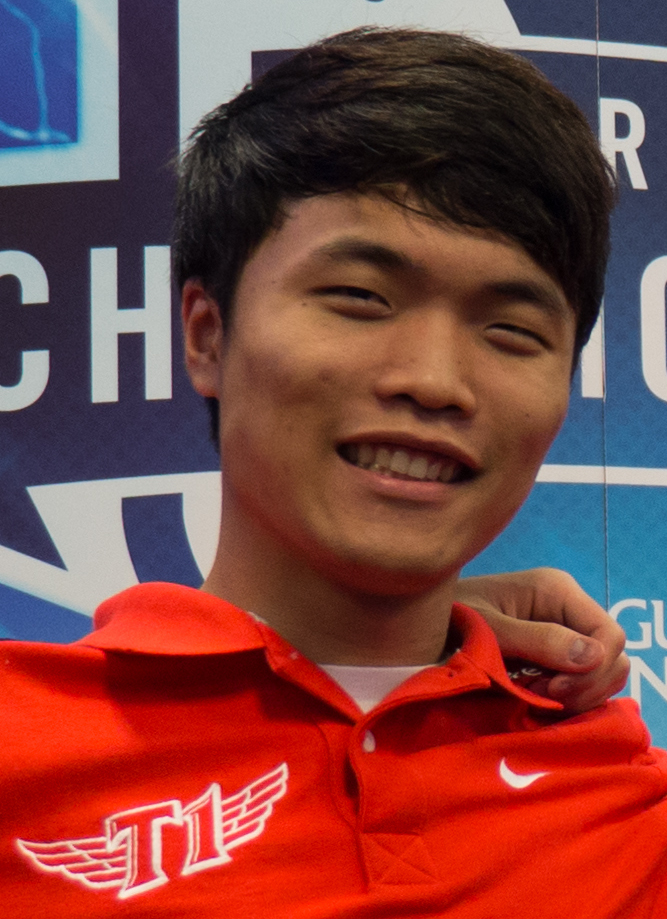
Impact at the League of Legends Season 3 World Championship

In 2013, Impact joined SK Telecom T1 K along with Bengi, Faker, Piglet and PoohManDo. The team went on to finished third in the spring split, and win the summer finals against KT Rolster Bullets. The team qualified for the 2013 World Championship as Korea's third seed, and subsequently tore through the tournament, dropping only 3 matches in the entire event, capped with a 3–0 sweep of China's Royal Club.

Following their World Championship victory, Impact and SK Telecom T1 K, won the winter split in the LCK, as well as All-Start Paris, before struggling in spring and summer, failing to place top 4 in either split, and missing out on the 2014 World Championship, where Impact was unable to defend his title internationally. At the end of the season, SKT parted ways with Impact.

=== Team Impulse ===
Impact joined Team Impulse ahead of the 2015 season, moving to the LCS in North America. Impact, having no formal education in speaking English, is said to have mastered the language in only a week using Rosetta Stone. The team had moderate regular season success, placing fourth and third in spring and summer, respectively. Impact was also voted to the First Team All–Pro in Summer, the first time the LCS gave out such awards. However, in playoffs, the team lost both times in the semifinals, then missed Worlds after falling to Cloud9 in the regional gauntlet.

=== NRG Esports ===
After the conclusion of the 2015 season, Impact left Team Impulse for NRG Esports.The team made playoffs in spring with a 9–9 record, but were swept 0–3 in the quarterfinals by Team Liquid.

=== Cloud9 ===
After NRG's mediocre finish in spring, Cloud9 acquired Impact from NRG, and started him as their top laner for the summer split after a temporary bootcamp in Korea. In the summer split, Cloud9 placed third in the regular season with a 12–6 record, while Impact saw his former team NRG relegated out of the LCS. Impact was voted to the All Pro Third Team, and Cloud9 advanced all the way to the finals, before falling to Team SoloMid. Cloud9 qualified for the Regional Gauntlet at the end of the season, and defeated both Team Envy and Immortals to earn a spot at the 2016 World Championship. At Worlds, Cloud9 made it out of their group, Group B, and advanced to the knockout stage with a 3–3 record. Additionally, SK Telecom T1 were the first seed from Group B with a 5–1 record, and were the eventual winners of the tournament, but their only loss in the group stage came at the hands of Cloud9, against their former top laner, Impact. In the quarterfinals, Cloud9 were defeated 3–0 by Samsung Galaxy, who later reached the finals before losing to SKT.

Impact remained on Cloud9 for the 2017 season, although substitute top laner Ray also joined the team, and played several games throughout the year in place of Impact. The team started the season strong, with 8 consecutive wins, and eventually finished the season with a 14–4 record. Impact was voted to the All Pro Second Team, and the team enjoyed a bye in the first round of the playoffs. In the semifinals, Cloud9 swept Phoenix 1 3–0, which set up a rematch from the previous year against Team SoloMid in the finals. Cloud9 once again lost the match, after a full five games, and finished the split in second place. In summer, Cloud9 finished in fourth place in the regular season, but in the quarterfinals of the playoffs, Cloud9 were defeated by Dignitas in what was described as a "massive upset", and knocked out early. The team qualified for the Regional Gauntlet once again, and defeated Counter Logic Gaming 3–1 to qualify for Worlds. At the 2017 World Championship, Cloud9 went undefeated in the Play–In stage, winning all 7 games to advance to the group stage, where they were placed into Group A, which once again had Impact's former squad, SK Telecom T1. Once again they achieved a 3–3 result, placing second in their group, and advanced to the quarterfinals. Cloud9 was matched against Team WE in the quarterfinals, and lost a five-game series 2–3.

=== Team Liquid ===
At the end of the 2017 season, Impact once again changed teams, reportedly turning down an offer to return to SK Telecom T1, opting instead to remain in North America and join Team Liquid. In spring, Team Liquid made playoff with a 11–7 record, and won matches against Cloud9 and Echo Fox to make the finals, where they defeated 100 Thieves 3–0, setting a record for fastest finals victory, and giving Impact his first LCS Title. The win earned Team Liquid a spot at the 2018 Mid–Season Invitational, where they went 4–6, losing a tiebreaker to Fnatic and placing fifth in the group stage, failing to advance. In summer, Team Liquid took first place in the regular season, securing a bye to the semifinals. Impact was also elected Third Team All Pro. Once again, they advanced, defeating 100 Thieves to face Impact's former team Cloud9 in the finals. Team Liquid swept the match, with a clean 3–0 victory over Cloud9 and Impact hoisted his second consecutive trophy. Due to their victories, Team Liquid qualified for the 2018 League of Legends World Championship as North America's first seed. At the tournament, they were drawn into Group D, and finished in third with a 3–3 record, failing to qualify for the knockout stage, and finishing in 9th–11th.

In 2019, Impact and Team Liquid once again placed first in the regular season, finishing with a 14–4 record. Impact was named to the All–Pro Second Team, and Team Liquid won the split 3–2 over Team SoloMid, giving Impact his third straight title. The team once again was invited to the Mid–Season Invitational, and placed fourth in the group stage with a 4–6 record, qualifying for the knockout stage as the lowest seed, and would face the reigning World Champions Invictus Gaming in the semifinals. Despite being heavy underdogs, Team Liquid upset Invictus Gaming 3–1, and became to first North American team to make the finals at a major international event. In the finals, the team faced Europe's G2, and were swept 0–3 in the finals. For the third straight split, Team Liquid finished the regular season in first place, with a 14–4 record in summer. Impact was also named First Team All-Pro. In playoffs, Team Liquid defeated Clutch Gaming to make the finals, which they won for the fourth time, this time over Cloud9. After winning his fourth title, Impact qualified for his fifth World Championship. At Worlds 2019, Team Liquid finished third in Group D with a 3–3 record once again, failing to advance past the group stage, and ending their season.

Impact entered 2020 in the last year of his three-year contract, after winning all four of his splits with Team Liquid. But in spring, Team Liquid struggled, going 7–11 and missing playoffs entirely, placing in the penultimate spot. In summer, the team returned to the playoffs, and once again took first place, going 13–5 and earning a bye in the first round. Impact was voted an All Pro after missing the award in spring, as he was named to the Second Team. In playoffs, Impact lost his first domestic playoffs match since 2017, 2–3 against FlyQuest in the upper bracket finals, then fell 2–3 to Team SoloMid in the lower bracket finals to place third on the season, and earn the third and final seed at the 2020 Worlds Championship.

=== Evil Geniuses ===
Impact left Team Liquid and joined Evil Geniuses in late 2020, ahead of the Spring 2021 split. In Spring 2022, the team qualified for playoffs with a 10–9 record. Evil Geniuses would go on to win the split, with Impact breaking his previous record of fastest LCS finals series, beating 100 Thieves in only an hour and 18 minutes. Impact left Evil Geniuses in November 2022.

=== FlyQuest ===
Impact joined FlyQuest for the 2023 season. The team consisted of known former LCK players like Prince and Vicla. FlyQuest managed a 14-4 record in the Spring split, yet fell short in playoffs to Golden Guardians, missing out on MSI 2023. In the Summer 2023 split, expectations were again high for FlyQuest with the addition of support Vulcan. FlyQuest would go on to shock with a ninth place finish in the Summer split, and the team would announce Impact's departure on November 22.

=== Team Liquid ===
Impact rejoined Team Liquid for the 2024 season. In returning to playing top lane for the team, he slotted into a roster including North American prospects Yeon and APA, as well as fellow Korean veterans CoreJJ and Umti. Impact and his team went on to win the 2024 LCS Spring Split, and earned a spot at that year's Mid-Season Invitational. A year later, he won the inaugural League of Legends Championship of The Americas (LTA) Split with the team and qualified for the 2025 First Stand Tournament. The team would announce Impact's departure after the 2025 season.

=== Sentinels ===
Impact joined Sentinels for the 2026 LCS season as its top-laner.

== Tournament results ==
=== SK Telecom T1 ===
- 1st – HOT6iX Champions Summer 2013 (SK Telecom T1)
- 1st – Season 3 World Championship (SK Telecom T1)
- 1st – PANDORA.TV Champions Winter 2013–2014 (SK Telecom T1 K)
- 1st – All-Star Paris 2014 Invitational (SK Telecom T1 K)
- 1st – ITENJOY NLB Summer 2014 (SK Telecom T1 K)

=== Cloud 9 ===
- 2nd – 2016 NA LCS Summer (Cloud 9)
- 2nd – 2017 NA LCS Spring (Cloud 9)
- 1st – 2017 Rift Rivals Blue Rift (NA LCS)

=== Team Liquid ===
- 1st – 2018 NA LCS Spring (Team Liquid)
- 2nd – 2018 Rift Rivals Blue Rift (NA LCS)
- 1st – 2018 NA LCS Summer (Team Liquid)
- 1st – 2019 LCS Spring (Team Liquid)
- 2nd – 2019 Mid-Season Invitational (Team Liquid)
- 2nd – 2019 Rift Rivals Blue Rift (LCS)
- 1st – 2019 LCS Summer (Team Liquid)
- 1st - 2024 LCS Spring (Team Liquid)

=== Evil Geniuses ===
- 2nd – 2022 LCS Lock In (Evil Geniuses)
- 1st – 2022 LCS Spring (Evil Geniuses)
