= Ssumday =

South Korean League of Legends pro gamer

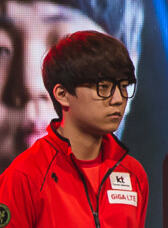
- Kim in 2015

Personal information
- Name: Kim Chan-ho
- Nationality: South Korean

Current team
- Team: HANJIN BRION Challengers
- Role: Head coach
- Game: League of Legends

Career information
- Playing career: 2013–2023
- Role: Toplaner
- Coaching career: 2026–present

Team history

As player:
- 2013–2016: KT Rolster
- 2017: Dignitas
- 2018–2022: 100 Thieves
- 2023: Evil Geniuses
- 2023: 100 Thieves

As coach:
- 2026–present: HANJIN BRION Challengers

Career highlights and awards
- 1× LCS Summer Champion (2021)

Kim Chan-ho (Korean: 김찬호) better known as Ssumday, is a South Korean professional League of Legends coach and former player who is the head coach of HANJIN BRION Challengers. Ssumday began his professional career in Korea on KT Rolster as their toplaner, before moving to North America where he spent a year with Team Dignitas, after which he signed with 100 Thieves in 2018. Ssumday won his first domestic championship in 2021 after eight splits with the team.

== Playing career ==
=== KT Rolster ===
Ssumday joined KT Rolster Bullets in early 2013 as their toplaner. The team had moderate success, placing third in Winter and second in Summer of the 2013 season. In 2014, KT Bullets took another third-place finish in Winter, but had no further success. At the end of 2014, after the World Championship concluded, the LCK announced large changes to its structure, which would include the two KT teams, KT Bullets and KT Arrows, merging into a single team, as well as the reduction from 3 splits a year, to two. In 2015, KT Rolster advanced to the finals once more in summer, and despite losing to SK Telecom T1, they qualified for the 2015 World Championship. At Worlds, KT took first place in their group with a 5–1 record and advanced to the knockout stage where they faced a fellow Korean team in Koo Tigers, and were defeated 1–3, exiting in the quarterfinals. For the 2016 season, KT took third place in spring, second place in summer, but did not qualify for the World Championship, losing out to Samsung Galaxy in the regional finals. After the 2016 season, it was announced that Ssumday would be leaving KT Rolster.

=== Dignitas ===
Ssumday joined Team Dignitas in 2016, and once again had moderate success, placing third in summer as well as picking up First Team All–Pro honors. However, in the regional finals, Dignitas were swept 0–3 by FlyQuest and once again missed Worlds. After the 2017 season, Riot announced that the LCS would be pursuing a franchised model, and Dignitas would not be a part of the league in 2018.

=== 100 Thieves ===
After Dignitas dissolved, Ssumday signed with a new organization, 100 Thieves, for a sum reported to be more than US$700,000. In their first split, the Thieves took first place in the regular season, and made it to the LCS finals, before they fell 0–3 to Team Liquid. In summer, Ssumday picked up another First Team All–Pro, and the 100 Thieves qualified for the 2018 World Championship, but bowed out in the group stage with a disappointing 2–4 record. The team struggled in 2019 and 2020, staying near the bottom of the standing in the LCS, before making a comeback in summer of 2021, after Ssumday acquired his green card, granting him residency in the United States. 100 Thieves finished second in the regular season, and went on to defeat Team Liquid in the finals for Ssumday's first domestic title, which Ssumday cited as a very important and emotional achievement.

=== Evil Geniuses ===
For the 2023 LCS Spring Split, Ssumday signed with Evil Geniuses.

=== 100 Thieves (second stint) ===
For the 2023 LCS Summer Split, Ssumday re-signed with 100 Thieves. After the season, Ssumday remained on 100 Thieves as a content creator. In May 2024, Ssumday announced his retirement from professional League of Legends.

== Coaching career ==
On June 23, 2026, Ssumday was announced as the new head coach for the challengers team of HANJIN BRION.
