= 2026 LCS season =

- League: LCS
- Sport: League of Legends
- Duration: 24 January – 1 March (Lock-In); 4 April – 14 June (Spring); 25 July – 4 October (Summer)
- Teams: 8

Lock-In
- Champions: LYON
- Runners-up: Cloud9 KIA
- Season MVP: Kacper "Inspired" Słoma (LYON)

Spring
- Champions: LYON
- Runners-up: Team Liquid Alienware
- Season MVP: Kang "Saint" Sung-in (LYON)

Summer
- Champions: Team Liquid Alienware
- Runners-up: LYON
- Season MVP: Kim "Berserker" Min-cheol (LYON)

LCS seasons
- ← 2025 (LTA North) 2027 →

The 2026 LCS season was the 14th season of the League Championship Series (LCS), a North American professional esports league for the video game League of Legends. It was the league's first season after its reinstatement following the discontinuation of the League of Legends Championship of The Americas (LTA), which merged the LCS with the Campeonato Brasileiro de League of Legends (CBLOL), which was also reinstated, and the Liga Latinoamérica (LLA) in 2025.

It was also the first LCS season under the new three-split structure and competitive calendar introduced by the game's developer Riot Games during the 2025 competitive season. The season began on 24 January and ended on 4 October.

LYON won the Lock-In Tournament and the Spring Split, defeating Cloud9 KIA and Team Liquid Alienware, respectively. Team Liquid Alienware also won the Summer Split, defeating LYON. All three teams qualified for the 2026 World Championship, with Team Liquid also qualifying for the Mid-Season Invitational. LYON also became one of four teams across the six Tier 1 regionsto qualify for all three international competitions as they also qualified for the First Stand Tournament.

== Background ==
The LCS initially ceased following Riot Games' announcement on June 11, 2024, in a blog post titled "LoL Esports: Building Towards A Brighter Future" that the LCS, CBLOL and LLA would plan to merge into a Pan-American league that would begin play in 2025, which would eventually be known as the League of Legends Championship of The Americas or LTA. The new merged league, which consisted of two conferences (North and South), had its first season in 2025, but was met with criticism on branding, competitive gaps between the Northern and Southern teams, and split formats. As a result, the new league struggled in viewership numbers. In the LTA North, the second and third splits only garnered an estimated 147,000 and 159,000 peak viewers respectively – significantly lower than the Spring and Summer splits of the 2024 LCS season.

During the maiden LTA Championship Finals between FlyQuest of the North Conference (now LCS) and Vivo Keyd Stars of the South Conference (now CBLOL), Riot Games announced that the LCS and CBLOL would return as independent leagues beginning with the 2026 competitive season.

== League changes ==
=== Splits ===
On 5 November 2025, the LCS announced that the "LCS Lock-In Tournament" would return for the first time since the 2022 season and would be the league's first split as opposed to being a pre-season tournament. The next two splits will also be known back to Spring and Summer.

=== Teams ===
Starting in 2026, the LCS will have one guest team similar to the lone LTA season, where the guest team will be subject to promotion and relegation against teams from Tier 2 leagues (North American Challengers League and Liga Regional Norte). Before the lone LTA season in 2025, it was announced that both Immortals and NRG Esports, two teams from the most recent LCS season, would leave competitive League of Legends, reducing the league's number of teams to eight.

Three team changes occurred heading into the 2026 season. On July 19, 2025, 100 Thieves confirmed its departure from the league after its 2025 season in the LTA and its final World Championship appearance in 2025, with the LCS announcing on October 10 that Sentinels would take its place from the 2026 season onward. Following the LCS's reinstatement on September 28, 2025, LYON, who was selected as a partner team in the former LTA North from the former LLA, confirmed its participation for the 2026 LCS season. Disguised would also win the LTA North promotion and relegation tournament to advance to its first LCS season in 2026.

=== Formats ===
Both the Spring and Summer splits followed the same regular season format, similar to the League of Legends EMEA Championship (LEC), but both splits each had a different playoffs format.

=== International tournament slots ===
In line with the new international tournament allocation for each region introduced in 2025, the LCS will also have the same number of qualified teams to all three international competitions each as with the LCK, LCP, LEC, and LPL – one for the First Stand Tournament, two for the Mid-Season Invitational, and three for the League of Legends World Championship (a fourth can be unlocked if an LCS team finishes as a finalist at MSI).

== Road shows ==
On 8 March 2026, the LCS announced that the venue for the Spring split finals would be in Arizona, to be held at the Mullett Arena in Arizona State University in Tempe, a suburb of Phoenix, from 13–14 June. These were the LCS' first matches outside of Los Angeles since the 2023 LCS Summer Split finals, which were held at the Prudential Center in Newark, New Jersey.

During the Spring Split finals on 14 June, the LCS announced that the Summer Split finals weekend, known as the "2026 LCS Championship", would be held at the Gas South Arena in Duluth, Georgia, a suburb of Atlanta, from 3–4 October. Mexico City would host the league's first "Team Homegrounds" event from 29–30 August at the Arena Esports Stadium at Artz Pedregal, hosted by LYON.

== Lock-In ==
=== Format ===
The LCS Lock-In Tournament featured eight (8) teams competing in a swiss stage tournament where all matches were best-of-threes. The team finished with a 3–0 record and the three teams that had a 2–1 record qualified for the playoffs. Among the three teams that finish with a 1–2 record, the team that had a better game record qualified as the fifth seed, while the remaining two teams competed in a best-of-one tie-breaker match to determine the sixth playoff seed.

All playoff matches were best-of-five series, applying the Double-elimination tournament bracket. The 3–0 team was able to choose their opponent for the first playoff round. The winner of the LCS Lock-In Tournament represented the league as its lone representative at the 2026 First Stand Tournament.

The draw for the first round of the Lock-In tournament was held on 13 January 2026.

=== Swiss Stage ===
Venue: Riot Games Arena, Los Angeles, California, United States

Bracket

2–0
Cloud9 KIA	2
1–0	FlyQuest	1
Cloud9 KIA	2
0–0	LYON	0
Sentinels	1	FlyQuest	2
Disguised	2	Disguised	1	1–1
LYON	2	Disguised	2
Dignitas	0	LYON	1
FlyQuest	2	Team Liquid Alienware	1
Shopify Rebellion	0	0–1	Sentinels	2
Cloud9 KIA	2	Sentinels	2
Team Liquid Alienware	0	Dignitas	0
Shopify Rebellion	0
Team Liquid Alienware	2	0–2
Dignitas	2
Shopify Rebellion	0

Source: LoL Esports

Standings

Record	Team	Qualification
3–0	Cloud9 KIA	Playoffs
2–1	FlyQuest	Playoffs
2–1	Sentinels	Playoffs
2–1	Disguised	Playoffs
1–2	LYON	Playoffs
1–2	Team Liquid Alienware	Playoffs
1–2	Dignitas	Eliminated
0–3	Shopify Rebellion	Eliminated

Tiebreaker

Tiebreaker Series 1; 8 February
Team Liquid Alienware	1
Dignitas	0

=== Playoffs ===
Venue: Riot Games Arena, Los Angeles, California, United States

Upper Bracket Round 1	Upper Bracket Final	Final
15 February
Cloud9 KIA	3
22 February
FlyQuest	0
Cloud9 KIA	3
14 February
Sentinels	0
Sentinels	3
Disguised	2	1 March
Cloud9 KIA	1
Lower Bracket Round 1	Lower Bracket Round 2	Lower Bracket Final	LYON	3
21 February
28 February
LYON	3
27 February	Sentinels	1
FlyQuest	0
LYON	3	LYON	3
20 February
Team Liquid Alienware	1
Team Liquid Alienware	3
Disguised	0

Source: LoL Esports

== Spring ==
=== Format ===
The Spring Split featured eight (8) teams competing in a single-round robin tournament where all matches were played in best-of-threes. The top six (6) teams advanced to the playoffs. The playoffs mirrored the LCS Lock-In Tournament, with all matches being played in best-of-fives and the top two teams qualifying for the 2026 Mid-Season Invitational.

=== Regular season ===
Venue: Riot Games Arena, Los Angeles, California, United States

Pos	Team	Pld	W	L	PCT	Qualification
1	Cloud9 KIA	7	7	0	1.000	Playoffs
2	LYON	7	5	2	.714	Playoffs
3	Team Liquid Alienware	7	5	2	.714	Playoffs
4	FlyQuest	7	4	3	.571	Playoffs
5	Sentinels	7	3	4	.429	Playoffs
6	Shopify Rebellion	7	2	5	.286	Playoffs
7	Disguised	7	2	5	.286	Eliminated
8	Dignitas	7	0	7	.000	Eliminated

Updated to match(es) played on 17 May 2026. Source: LoL Esports

=== Playoffs ===
Venues:

- Riot Games Arena, Los Angeles, California, United States
- Mullett Arena, Phoenix, Arizona, United States

Upper semifinals	Upper final	Final
23 May – Los Angeles
1	Cloud9 KIA	3
7 June – Los Angeles
4	FlyQuest	2
1	Cloud9 KIA	0
24 May – Los Angeles
2	LYON	3
2	LYON	3
3	Team Liquid Alienware	2	14 June – Phoenix
2	LYON	3
Lower quarterfinals	Lower semifinals	Lower final	3	Team Liquid Alienware	0
30 May – Los Angeles
13 June – Phoenix
5	Sentinels	0
6 June – Los Angeles	1	Cloud9 KIA	0
4	FlyQuest	3
4	FlyQuest	1	3	Team Liquid Alienware	3
31 May – Los Angeles
3	Team Liquid Alienware	3
6	Shopify Rebellion	0
3	Team Liquid Alienware	3

Source: LoL Esports

=== Awards ===
- 1st Team All-Pro:
  - T Thanatos, Cloud9 KIA
  - J Josedeodo, Team Liquid Alienware
  - M Saint, LYON
  - B Berserker, LYON
  - S Vulcan, Cloud9 KIA
- 2nd Team All-Pro:
  - T Morgan, Team Liquid Alienware
  - J Inspired, LYON
  - M Quad, FlyQuest
  - B Massu, FlyQuest
  - S Isles, LYON
- 3rd Team All-Pro:
  - T Gakgos, FlyQuest
  - J Blaber, Cloud9 KIA
  - M APA, Cloud9
  - B Yeon, Team Liquid Alienware
  - S CoreJJ, Team Liquid Alienware
- Most Valuable Player: Vulcan, Cloud9 KIA
- Coaching Staff of the Split: Cloud9 KIA

== Summer ==
=== Format ===
Similar to the Spring split, the Summer split had the same eight (8) teams competing in a single-round robin tournament where all matches were played in best-of-threes, with the top six (6) teams qualifying for the playoffs. Identical to the 2024 LCS season, the playoffs were a double-elimination bracket with an extended lower bracket. All playoff matches were played in best-of-fives, with the top three (3) teams in the playoffs securing qualification for the 2026 League of Legends World Championship, hosted in the United States.

=== Regular season ===
Venues:

- Riot Games Arena, Los Angeles, California, United States
- Arena Esports Center at Artz Pedregal, Mexico City, Mexico

Pos	Team	Pld	W	L	PCT	Qualification
1	LYON	7	6	1	.857	Playoffs
2	Team Liquid Alienware	7	6	1	.857	Playoffs
3	Cloud9 KIA	7	5	2	.714	Playoffs
4	Sentinels	7	4	3	.571	Playoffs
5	FlyQuest	7	3	4	.429	Playoffs
6	Shopify Rebellion	7	3	4	.429	Playoffs
7	Disguised	7	1	6	.143	Eliminated
8	Dignitas	7	0	7	.000	Eliminated

Updated to match(es) played on 6 September 2026. Source: LoL Esports

=== Playoffs ===
The top-seeded team will get to choose their opponents in the second round. Venues:

- Riot Games Arena, Los Angeles, California, United States
- Gas South Arena, Atlanta, Georgia, United States

Round 1	Round 2	Round 3	Final
19 September – Los Angeles
12 September – Los Angeles	1	LYON	1
3	Cloud9 KIA	3	3	Cloud9 KIA	3	27 September – Los Angeles
6	Shopify Rebellion	0	3	Cloud9 KIA	1
20 September – Los Angeles	2	Team Liquid Alienware	3
13 September – Los Angeles	2	Team Liquid Alienware	3
4	Sentinels	0	5	FlyQuest	0
4 October – Atlanta
5	FlyQuest	3
2	Team Liquid Alienware	3
1	LYON	1
Lower round 1	Lower round 2	Lower round 3	Lower final
3 October – Atlanta
26 September – Los Angeles	3	Cloud9 KIA	1
25 September – Los Angeles	1	LYON	3	1	LYON	3
18 September – Los Angeles	5	FlyQuest	2	6	Shopify Rebellion	1
6	Shopify Rebellion	3	6	Shopify Rebellion	3
4	Sentinels	2

Source: LoL Esports

=== Awards ===
- Most Valuable Player: Berserker, LYON
- Finals MVP: Josedeodo, Team Liquid Alienware
- Rookie of the Year: Cryogen, FlyQuest
- 1st Team All-Pro:
  - T Morgan, Team Liquid Alienware
  - J Josedeodo, Team Liquid Alienware
  - M Saint, LYON
  - B Berserker, LYON
  - S CoreJJ, Team Liquid Alienware
- 2nd Team All-Pro:
  - T Dhokla, LYON
  - J HamBak, Sentinels
  - M Quid, Team Liquid Alienware
  - B Yeon, Team Liquid Alienware
  - S Isles, LYON
- 3rd Team All-Pro:
  - T Thanatos, Cloud9 KIA
  - J Blaber, Cloud9 KIA
  - M Loki, Cloud9 KIA
  - B Rahel, Sentinels
  - S Vulcan, Cloud9 KIA
