= 2023 LCS season =

- League: LCS
- Sport: League of Legends
- Duration: January 26 – April 9 (Spring); June 14 – August 20 (Summer)
- Teams: 10

Spring Split
- Champions: Cloud9
- Runners-up: Golden Guardians
- Top seed: Cloud9
- Season MVP: Kim "Berserker" Min-cheol

Summer Split
- Champions: NRG
- Runners-up: Cloud9
- Top seed: Cloud9
- Season MVP: Joseph "jojopyun" Pyun

LCS seasons
- ← 2022 2024 →

The 2023 LCS season was the 11th season of the League Championship Series (LCS), a North American professional esports league for the video game League of Legends. The season was divided into two splits: Spring and Summer. The Spring Split began on January 26, 2023, and culminated with the Spring Split Finals on April 9, 2023. The Summer Split began on June 14, 2023, and culminated with the LCS Championship Final on August 20, 2023.

Prior to the end of the spring split playoffs, NRG Esports acquired Counter Logic Gaming's franchise slot. Just before the original planned start of the Summer Split, most LCS franchises ended their Challenger programs, leaving many pro players without teams. In response, the LCS Players Association threatened a walkout. Riot Games, the governing body of LCS, responded by delaying the Summer Split by two weeks for negotiations. They also warned that if no agreement was reached in that time, the entire LCS season would be canceled, and North American teams would miss Worlds 2023. Ultimately, negotiations continued, and the Summer Split started two weeks late.

Cloud9 won the spring split playoffs, directly qualifying them for the 2023 Mid-Season Invitational (MSI), while Golden Guardians finished as the runners-up, qualifying them for the MSI play-in stage. In the LCS Championship playoffs, NRG, Cloud9, and Team Liquid claimed the first, second, and third positions, respectively, earning direct qualifications to the 2023 World Championship. Golden Guardians, finishing in fourth place, qualified for the Worlds Qualifying Series.

== Spring ==
The Spring Split regular season ran from January 26 to March 17, 2023. The regular season followed a standard double round-robin format, where each team faced every other team twice, once in each half of the split. Regular season matches were best-of-one, allowing the use of any champion, except in cases of game-breaking bugs. If a new champion was introduced during the season, it was banned from use by any team for two weeks. Any ties in record were broken by head-to-head records, and any remaining ties were broken by tiebreaker matches.

The playoffs ran from March 23 to April 9, 2023, and followed a double-elimination tournament format. The top six teams with the highest regular season records secured spots in the Spring Playoffs, with the top four starting in the upper bracket and the following two in the lower bracket. All matches were played as a best-of-five series. The Finals were played at PNC Arena in Raleigh, North Carolina, and the top two teams from the playoffs qualified for the 2023 Mid-Season Invitational.

=== Regular season ===
Pos	Team	Pld	W	L	PCT	Qualification
1	Cloud9	19	15	4	.789	Upper bracket semifinals
2	FlyQuest	19	14	5	.737	Upper bracket semifinals
3	100 Thieves	20	12	8	.600	Upper bracket semifinals
4	Counter Logic Gaming	19	10	9	.526	Upper bracket semifinals
5	Evil Geniuses	19	10	9	.526	Lower bracket quarterfinals
6	Golden Guardians	18	9	9	.500	Lower bracket quarterfinals
7	Team SoloMid	18	8	10	.444	
8	Team Liquid	18	8	10	.444	
9	Immortals	18	4	14	.222	
10	Dignitas	18	3	15	.167	

Source: LoL Esports

=== Playoffs ===
==== Bracket ====
Upper semifinals	Upper final	Final
1	Cloud9	3
4	Counter Logic Gaming	1
1	Cloud9	3
2	FlyQuest	0
2	FlyQuest	3
3	100 Thieves	0
1	Cloud9	3
Lower quarterfinals	Lower semifinals	Lower final	6	Golden Guardians	1
3	100 Thieves	2
2	FlyQuest	2
6	Golden Guardians	3
6	Golden Guardians	3	6	Golden Guardians	3
5	Evil Geniuses	0
5	Evil Geniuses	3
4	Counter Logic Gaming	0

==== Final standings ====
Pos	Team	Qualification
1	Cloud9	2023 Mid-Season Invitational bracket stage
2	Golden Guardians	2023 Mid-Season Invitational play-in stage
3	FlyQuest	
4	Evil Geniuses	
5–6	Counter Logic Gaming	
5–6	100 Thieves	

=== Awards ===
- 1st Team All-Pro:
  - T Fudge, Cloud9
  - J Blaber, Cloud9
  - M Gori, Golden Guardians
  - B Berserker, Cloud9
  - S Vulcan, Evil Geniuses
- 2nd Team All-Pro:
  - T Impact, FlyQuest
  - J Spica, FlyQuest
  - M EMENES, Cloud9
  - B Prince, FlyQuest
  - S Zven, Cloud9
- 3rd Team All-Pro:
  - T Ssumday, Evil Geniuses
  - J Inspired, Evil Geniuses
  - M VicLa, FlyQuest
  - B Doublelift, 100 Thieves
  - S huhi, Golden Guardians
- Most Valuable Player: Berserker, Cloud9
- Coaching Staff of the Split: Cloud9

== Summer ==
The Summer Split regular season ran from June 14 to July 21, 2023. The regular season followed the same format as the Spring Split.

The playoffs ran from July 27 to August 20, 2023, and followed a double-elimination tournament format. The top eight teams with the highest regular season records secured spots in the playoofs, with the top two starting in the upper bracket semifinals, the following four starting in the upper bracket quarterfinals, and the remaining two starting in the lower bracket. The LCS Championship Finals were played at the Prudential Center in Newark, New Jersey. The top three teams from the playoffs qualified for the 2023 League of Legends World Championship, while the fourth placed team moved on to the Worlds Qualifying Series.

=== Regular season ===
Pos	Team	Pld	W	L	PCT	Qualification
1	Cloud9	19	14	5	.737	Upper bracket semifinals
2	Golden Guardians	19	13	6	.684	Upper bracket semifinals
3	Evil Geniuses	18	12	6	.667	Upper bracket quarterfinals
4	Team Liquid	18	10	8	.556	Upper bracket quarterfinals
5	NRG	18	9	9	.500	Upper bracket quarterfinals
6	Team SoloMid	18	8	10	.444	Upper bracket quarterfinals
7	Dignitas	19	8	11	.421	Lower bracket round 1
8	100 Thieves	19	7	12	.368	Lower bracket round 1
9	FlyQuest	18	6	12	.333	
10	Immortals	18	5	13	.278	

Source: LoL Esports

=== LCS Championship playoffs ===
==== Bracket ====
Upper quarterfinals	Upper semifinals	Upper final	Grand Final
1	Cloud9	3
3	Evil Geniuses	3	3	Evil Geniuses	0
6	Team SoloMid	2	1	Cloud9	3
5	NRG	0
2	Golden Guardians	1
4	Team Liquid	1	5	NRG	3
5	NRG	3
1	Cloud9	1
5	NRG	3
Lower round 1	Lower quarterfinals	Lower semifinals	Lower final
2	Golden Guardians	3
6	Team SoloMid	2	7	Dignitas	0	5	NRG	3
7	Dignitas	3	2	Golden Guardians	2	4	Team Liquid	2
4	Team Liquid	3
3	Evil Geniuses	1
4	Team Liquid	3	4	Team Liquid	3
8	100 Thieves	1

==== Final standings ====
Pos	Team	Qualification
1	NRG	Worlds 2023 Main Event
2	Cloud9	Worlds 2023 Main Event
3	Team Liquid	Worlds 2023 Main Event
4	Golden Guardians	Worlds Qualifying Series 2023
5–6	Evil Geniuses	
5–6	Dignitas	
7–8	Team SoloMid	
7–8	100 Thieves	

=== Awards ===
- 1st Team All-Pro:
  - T Licorice, Golden Guardians
  - J Blaber, Cloud9
  - M jojopyun, Evil Geniuses
  - B Berserker, Cloud9
  - S huhi, Golden Guardians
- 2nd Team All-Pro:
  - T Summit, Team Liquid
  - J River, Golden Guardians
  - M Gori, Golden Guardians
  - B Stixxay, Golden Guardians
  - S Zven, Cloud9
- 3rd Team All-Pro:
  - T Fudge, Cloud9
  - J Pyosik, Team Liquid
  - M EMENES, Cloud9
  - B UNF0RGIVEN, Evil Geniuses
  - S CoreJJ, Team Liquid
- Most Valuable Player: jojopyun, Evil Geniuses
- Rookie of the Year: Yeon, Team Liquid
- Most Improved Player: Licorice, Golden Guardians
- Coaching Staff of the Split: Golden Guardians

== Notable events ==
=== CLG sells slot to NRG ===
On April 6, 2023, NRG announced that it would be acquiring Counter Logic Gaming (CLG) and taking over its LCS slot. In the announcement, NRG CEO Andy Miller stated that all aspects of CLG's League of Legends division would remain intact, including the LCS team, academy team, coaching staff, analysts. NRG continued to use the CLG name in League of Legends until the official name change was sanctioned by Riot.

=== Player strike ===
In May 2023, Riot Games announced its intention to remove the requirement for LCS teams to financially support a North American Challengers League (NACL) team in addition to their LCS roster. This decision was made in response to requests from the ownership groups of the LCS teams, each of which had invested US$10 million for an LCS spot when the league transitioned to a franchised model in 2018. Riot Games presented the removal of the NACL mandate as a means to offer LCS teams greater operational and financial flexibility and to bolster the long-term sustainability of both the teams and the professional esports ecosystem in North America. Subsequently, every LCS franchise aside from Team Liquid, Evil Geniuses, and FlyQuest, disbanded their development rosters.

In response, the LCS Players Association (LCSPA) threatened a player walkout as a show of solidarity to the adversely affected players just before the start of the Summer Split. The LCSPA characterized Riot Games' decision as an "unprecedented move to dismantle the NACL," which would have rendered as many as 70 players, coaches, and managers unemployed. Additionally, the LCSPA alleged that Riot Games' announcement contradicted prior assurances made to the LCSPA earlier in the year, indicating that there would be no alterations to the NACL in 2023. The LCSPA had called on Riot Games to extend support to the NACL, asserting that this was essential to maintaining the overall health of the North American League of Legends esports scene and ensuring that players in the league could earn a sustainable income. In support of this argument, the LCSPA cited the success of second-tier leagues in regions such as South Korea, Europe, and China as evidence of thriving League of Legends communities. The LCSPA outlined its demands, which included implementing a promotion and relegation system between professional and amateur leagues, establishing a Riot Games-funded revenue pool to cover NACL team salaries, and fostering partnerships between LCS teams and NACL teams for cost-sharing. The players also sought a guarantee of year-long LCS contracts for players who won the LCS summer finals and the opportunity for NACL players from disbanded teams to retain their spots in the league if they wished to compete together.

Riot Games decided to delay the start of the LCS Summer Split by two weeks to give more time for negotiations. They also stipulated that if both parties could not reach an agreement within the designated two-week period, the summer season would be canceled, and North American teams would not be able to compete in the 2023 World Championship.

On June 8, 2023, a deal between Riot, the teams and the LCSPA was agreed upon, with the 2023 Summer Split starting on June 14. Naz Aletaha, the global head of League of Legends esports, addressed the players' demands. While many of the requests were not approved, certain terms were agreed upon during negotiations. These terms encompassed the establishment of a new business model for the NACL, introducing a revenue-sharing arrangement with a 50/50 split between the NACL tournament operator, Rally Cry, and participating teams. Additionally, improvements to the NACL's governance model were outlined, including the introduction of a Team Participating Agreement (TPA) and a vetting process for participating organizations. Riot Games also committed to minimum notice and severance requirements for LCS players based on their salary levels, created a new working group for optimizing scrimmages between LCS teams and the LCSPA, and reinforced healthcare insurance requirements for new LCS imports, emphasizing player well-being in the league. Furthermore, Riot Games provided a one-time payment of $300,000 to Rally Cry, the NACL tournament organizer, to assist NACL teams during their transition to the new league structure. Aletaha also emphasized that Riot Games already allowed for cost-sharing between LCS and NACL teams. During the first week of the split, players acknowledged prevailing issues within the Challenger system, but criticized Riot Games handling of the situation.

== Broadcast ==
Initially, the LCS planned to have matches played on Thursdays and Fridays, beginning at 2 pm CT. The early start time was met with negative feedback from fans and prominent community figures. There were concerns that this scheduling decision might impact the popularity of the competition and the future growth of League of Legends esports in the region, as younger viewers may be heavily involved in school, homework, and extracurricular activities during the broadcast time. Riot subsequently changed the start time of LCS matches to 4 pm CT on Thursdays and Fridays. Following the Summer Split delay due to the LCSPA walkout, Summer Split matches took place on Wednesdays, Thursdays, and Fridays.
