= 2022 LCS season =

- The LCS's tenth season emblem
- League: LCS
- Sport: League of Legends
- Duration: January 14–30 (Lock In); February 5 – April 24 (Spring); June 18 – August 20 (Summer)
- Teams: 10
- TV partner(s): English: Twitch, YouTube

Lock In
- Winner: Team Liquid
- Runners-up: Evil Geniuses

Spring
- Winner: Evil Geniuses
- Runners-up: 100 Thieves
- Top seed: Team Liquid
- Season MVP: Park "Summit" Woo-tae

Summer
- Winner: Cloud9
- Runners-up: 100 Thieves
- Top seed: Evil Geniuses
- Season MVP: Kacper "Inspired" Słoma

LCS seasons
- ← 2021 2023 →

The 2022 LCS season was the tenth season of the League Championship Series (LCS), a professional esports league for the video game League of Legends. As 2022 was the tenth anniversary of the League Championship Series, Riot announced a new LCS logo alongside "year-long celebrations planned" for the league. The season was preceded with the LCS Lock In, a preseason tournament that ran from January 14 to 30, 2022. The season was divided into two splits: Spring and Summer. The Spring Split began on February 5 and culminated with the Spring playoff finals on April 24, 2022. The Summer Split began on June 18 and culminated with the LCS Championship Final on September 11, 2022.

In the 2022 season, Riot Games took action against Andy Dinh, CEO and co-founder of TSM, imposing a US$75,000 fine and a two-year probation following an LCS investigation that revealed a recurring pattern of bullying and rule violations related to profanity, hate speech, and harassment. Additionally, Riot permanently banned former TSM coach Peter Zhang for mishandling player salaries, soliciting loans, and failing to provide compensation.

Evil Geniuses won the spring split playoffs, qualifying them for the 2022 Mid-Season Invitational. In the LCS Championship playoffs, Cloud9, 100 Thieves, and Evil Geniuses claimed the first, second, and third positions, respectively, earning qualifications to the 2022 World Championship.

== Format and changes ==
On November 21, 2021, Riot announced the format for the 2022 LCS season. The season would begin with the LCS Lock In Tournament, which would remain the same as the inaugural tournament in 2021, with all 10 LCS teams participating in a group and bracket stage. The winning team would receive $150,000.

The LCS reverted to a split format with even spring and summer splits, each lasting eight weeks. Both split regular seasons would be a double round robin, with five games played on Saturdays and Sundays, and two "LCS Super Weeks" with five additional games on Fridays to complete the double round-robin. Unlike 2021, split records were confined to their respective splits. The LCS Spring Playoffs continued with the top six teams from the regular season, and the LCS Summer Playoffs included the top eight teams. The spring split winner qualified for the 2022 Mid-Season Invitational, and the playoff structure remained the same, with the top four teams in double-elimination and the fifth and sixth starting in the lower bracket. The LCS Summer Playoffs were similar to 2022, with the first seed choosing their side of the bracket. The top three teams from the summer playoffs qualified for the 2022 League of Legends World Championship.

== Lock In ==
The LCS 2022 Lock In was a preseason event that took place from January 14 to 30. It began with a round robin group stage with two groups of five teams, with all matches being in a best-of-one format. The groups were determined through a draft where the 10 teams took turns selecting another team to place into the other group. For instance, 100 Thieves chose Evil Geniuses to be placed into Group B, and then Evil Geniuses chose TSM to be in Group A, and so on. The top four teams from each group advanced to the knockout stage, which was a single-elimination tournament. The quarterfinals were best-of-three matches, while the semifinals and finals were best-of-five. The final was played at the LCS Studios, and the winners received a prize of US$150,000.

=== Group stage ===
Group A

Pos	Team	Pld	W	L	PCT	Qualification
1	100 Thieves	4	3	1	.750	Advance to quarterfinals
2	Cloud9	4	3	1	.750	Advance to quarterfinals
3	FlyQuest	4	2	2	.500	Advance to quarterfinals
4	Golden Guardians	4	1	3	.250	Advance to quarterfinals
5	Team SoloMid	4	1	3	.250	

Source: LoL Esports
Rules for classification: 1) Wins; 2) Head-to-head record

Group B

Pos	Team	Pld	W	L	PCT	Qualification
1	Evil Geniuses	4	4	0	1.000	Advance to quarterfinals
2	Team Liquid	4	3	1	.750	Advance to quarterfinals
3	Counter Logic Gaming	4	2	2	.500	Advance to quarterfinals
4	Dignitas	4	1	3	.250	Advance to quarterfinals
5	Immortals	4	0	4	.000	

Source: LoL Esports

=== Knockout stage ===
Quarterfinals
A1	100 Thieves	0
B4	Dignitas	2
B2	Team Liquid	2
A3	FlyQuest	0
B1	Evil Geniuses	2
A4	Golden Guardians	0
A2	Cloud9	2
B3	Counter Logic Gaming	1

Semifinals
B4	Dignitas	1
B2	Team Liquid	3
B1	Evil Geniuses	3
A2	Cloud9	0

Final
B2	Team Liquid	3
B1	Evil Geniuses	0

== Spring ==
The Spring Split regular season began on February 5, 2022. The regular season followed a standard double round-robin format, where each team faced every other team twice, once in each half of the split. The playoffs ran from April 2 to 24, 2022, and followed a double-elimination tournament format. The top six teams with the highest regular season records secured spots in the Spring Playoffs, with the top four starting in the upper bracket and the following two in the lower bracket. The top seed chose their opponent for the opening matches. The lower bracket finals and grand final were played at NRG Stadium in Houston, Texas, and winner grand final qualified for the 2022 Mid-Season Invitational.

=== Regular season ===
Pos	Team	Pld	W	L	PCT	Qualification
1	Team Liquid	18	14	4	.778	Advance to upper semifinals
2	Cloud9	18	13	5	.722	Advance to upper semifinals
3	100 Thieves	18	12	6	.667	Advance to upper semifinals
4	Evil Geniuses	19	10	9	.526	Advance to upper semifinals
5	FlyQuest	20	10	10	.500	Advance to lower quarterfinals
6	Golden Guardians	19	9	10	.474	Advance to lower quarterfinals
7	Dignitas	18	8	10	.444	
8	Counter Logic Gaming	18	6	12	.333	
9	Team SoloMid	18	5	13	.278	
10	Immortals	18	5	13	.278	

Source: LoL Esports

=== Playoffs ===
==== Bracket ====
Upper semifinals	Upper final	Final
2	Cloud9	0
3	100 Thieves	3
3	100 Thieves	3
1	Team Liquid	2
1	Team Liquid	3
4	Evil Geniuses	2
3	100 Thieves	0
Lower quarterfinals	Lower semifinal	Lower final	4	Evil Geniuses	3
4	Evil Geniuses	3
1	Team Liquid	0
6	FlyQuest	1
4	Evil Geniuses	3	4	Evil Geniuses	3
2	Cloud9	0
5	Golden Guardians	0
2	Cloud9	3

==== Final standings ====
Pos	Team	Qualification
1	Evil Geniuses	2022 Mid-Season Invitational
2	100 Thieves	
3	Team Liquid	
4	Cloud9	
5–6	Golden Guardians	
5–6	Flyquest	

=== Awards ===
- 1st Team All-Pro:
  - T Summit, Cloud9
  - J Blaber, Cloud9
  - M Bjergsen, Team Liquid
  - B Hans Sama, Team Liquid
  - S CoreJJ, Team Liquid
- 2nd Team All-Pro:
  - T Ssumday, 100 Thieves
  - J Santorin, Team Liquid
  - M toucouille, FlyQuest
  - B Berserker, Cloud9
  - S huhi, Team Liquid
- 3rd Team All-Pro:
  - T Bwipo, Team Liquid
  - J Closer, 100 Thieves
  - M Fudge, Cloud9
  - B FBI, 100 Thieves
  - S Vulcan, Evil Geniuses
- Most Valuable Player: Summit, Cloud9
- Coaching Staff of the Split: Team Liquid

== Summer ==
The Summer Split regular season ran from June 17 to August 14, 2022. The regular season followed the same format as the Spring Split. The LCS Championship playoffs ran from August 20 to September 11, 2022, and followed a double-elimination tournament format. The top eight teams with the highest regular season records secured spots in the playoffs, with the top two starting in the upper bracket semifinals, the following four starting in the upper bracket quarterfinals, and the remaining two starting in the lower bracket. The top three teams from the playoffs qualified for the 2022 League of Legends World Championship. The LCS Championship Finals were played at the United Center in Chicago, Illinois.

=== Regular season ===
Pos	Team	Pld	W	L	PCT	Qualification
1	Evil Geniuses	18	15	3	.833	Advance to upper semifinals
2	100 Thieves	18	14	4	.778	Advance to upper semifinals
3	Team Liquid	18	12	6	.667	Advance to upper quarterfinals
4	Counter Logic Gaming	18	11	7	.611	Advance to upper quarterfinals
5	Cloud9	19	11	8	.579	Advance to upper quarterfinals
6	FlyQuest	19	10	9	.526	Advance to upper quarterfinals
7	Team SoloMid	18	6	12	.333	Advance to lower round 1
8	Golden Guardians	18	5	13	.278	Advance to lower round 1
9	Immortals	18	4	14	.222	
10	Dignitas	18	3	15	.167	

Source: LoL Esports

=== LCS Championship playoffs ===
==== Bracket ====
Upper quarterfinals	Upper semifinals	Upper final	Final
1	Evil Geniuses	1
4	Counter Logic Gaming	2	5	Cloud9	3
5	Cloud9	3	5	Cloud9	3
2	100 Thieves	1
2	100 Thieves	3
3	Team Liquid	3	3	Team Liquid	2
6	FlyQuest	1
5	Cloud9	3
2	100 Thieves	0
Lower round 1	Lower quarterfinals	Lower semifinal	Lower final
7	Team SoloMid	2
7	Team SoloMid	3	1	Evil Geniuses	3	2	100 Thieves	3
6	FlyQuest	2	1	Evil Geniuses	3	1	Evil Geniuses	2
3	Team Liquid	2
4	Counter Logic Gaming	2
8	Golden Guardians	2	3	Team Liquid	3
4	Counter Logic Gaming	3

==== Final standings ====
Pos	Team	Qualification
1	Cloud9	2022 League of Legends World Championship
2	100 Thieves	2022 League of Legends World Championship
3	Evil Geniuses	2022 League of Legends World Championship
4	Team Liquid	
5–6	Counter Logic Gaming	
5–6	Team SoloMid	
7–8	FlyQuest	
7–8	Golden Guardians	

=== Awards ===
- 1st Team All-Pro:
  - T Ssumday, 100 Thieves
  - J Inspired, Evil Geniuses
  - M jojopyun, Evil Geniuses
  - B Danny, Evil Geniuses
  - S Vulcan, Evil Geniuses
- 2nd Team All-Pro:
  - T Impact, Evil Geniuses
  - J Closer, 100 Thieves
  - M Bjergsen, Team Liquid
  - B Berserker, Cloud9
  - S CoreJJ, Team Liquid
- 3rd Team All-Pro:
  - T Bwipo, Team Liquid
  - J Santorin, Team Liquid
  - M toucouille, FlyQuest
  - B FBI, 100 Thieves
  - S huhi, 100 Thieves
- Most Valuable Player: Inspired, Evil Geniuses
- Rookie of the Year: jojopyun, Evil Geniuses
- Most Improved Player: Contractz, Counter Logic Gaming
- Coaching Staff of the Split: Counter Logic Gaming

== Notable events ==
=== Tenth anniversary ===
The LCS celebrated its 10th anniversary in 2022 with a series of activities and content throughout the year. The League Championship Series had its first regular season match on February 7, 2013, where Counter Logic Gaming forced a surrender vote out of Team SoloMid. The LCS organized various activities and content throughout the 2022 competitive season, such as special episodes of LCS shows that were planned to air during the season. The celebrations were set to conclude at the 2022 LCS Championship.

=== Sanctions against Andy Dinh ===
On July 13, 2022, Riot Games took action against Andy Dinh, the CEO and co-founder of TSM, as a result of an LCS investigation. Dinh received a US$75,000 fine and a two-year probation period. The investigation revealed a recurring pattern of bullying and disparaging conduct directed at TSM players and staff, resulting in violations of two LCS rules related to profanity, hate speech, and harassment. During this two-year probation, an independent monitor would manage a reporting system for all TSM employees to report any potential misconduct or rule violations by Dinh. Additionally, TSM would be mandated to provide a notice, approved by the league, to both current employees and new hires, granting access to the reporting system and explaining its purpose. The ruling specified that any subsequent rule violations by Dinh during the probation period would lead to severe penalties within the Riot ecosystem. Riot Games also required TSM to demonstrate within 60 days that Dinh had completed sensitivity training and executive coaching from a provider endorsed by the LCS.

The investigation was initiated in late 2021 when Yiliang "Doublelift" Peng, a former TSM player, accused Dinh of verbally mistreating other players during a live stream. Following this, the LCS Players Association (LCSPA) reached out to other players and TSM employees to validate Peng's claims. Riot's inquiry included interviews with 14 individuals, including Dinh, and a review of relevant documents, such as emails, public statements, and videos. Several widely circulated videos spanning nearly a decade depicted Dinh shouting at other TSM esports athletes. The league's investigation was distinct from an inquiry commissioned by TSM's parent company, Swift, which concluded that Dinh had not engaged in unlawful conduct. However, Dinh did acknowledge his aggressive demeanor and committed to coaching. The league's competitive ruling was made independently from TSM's internal investigation.

=== Coach Zhang banned ===
On August 8, 2022, Riot Games announced the permanent ban of former TSM coach Peter Zhang from all League of Legends esports events due to confirmed accusations made against him earlier that year. This action came after Riot verified accusations made against Zhang earlier in the year. These allegations involved his mishandling of players' salaries, which ultimately led to his termination from TSM in March. Riot's investigation substantiated the findings of TSM's internal inquiry and resulted in Zhang's exclusion from Riot-sanctioned League events. Riot clarified that Zhang's actions were in violation of LCS rules. He diverted portions of player salaries to his own accounts and those of his associates, failed to provide full compensation to a former TSM player for the sale of their car, and sought loans from TSM players and staff. During the period between December 2021 and February 2022, Zhang appropriated approximately $250,000 from two players, who were meant to receive a significant part of their earnings through a third-party entity in China.

The identities of the two affected players were not disclosed, although there were indications that one of them was former TSM support Yursan. In addition to the salary diversions, Zhang also approached eight TSM players and staff members for financial assistance, leading to his immediate dismissal from TSM upon the discovery of these actions. TSM promptly took steps to reverse pending wire transfers, preventing Zhang from obtaining an additional $20,000 in loans. As of now, around $4,500 in outstanding loans remains unpaid to the players who extended financial support to Zhang. One of the most prominent allegations against Zhang pertained to his involvement in the sale of a car on behalf of former TSM support SwordArt. Despite the sale yielding $80,000, Zhang only returned $35,000 to SwordArt, leaving $45,000 unpaid, as confirmed by Riot's investigation.

Zhang was given the opportunity to defend himself by providing a statement, but his response did not contain compelling evidence to challenge the report's accuracy. Consequently, Riot imposed a permanent ban on Zhang, prohibiting his involvement in official Riot-sanctioned League esports events and his association with any team participating in official leagues and competitions worldwide. This decision was made in accordance with Section 14.2.10 of the LCS rulebook, which empowers the LCS to penalize individuals for conduct that disrupts the league's rules and integrity standards.
