= Huhi =

American League of Legends player

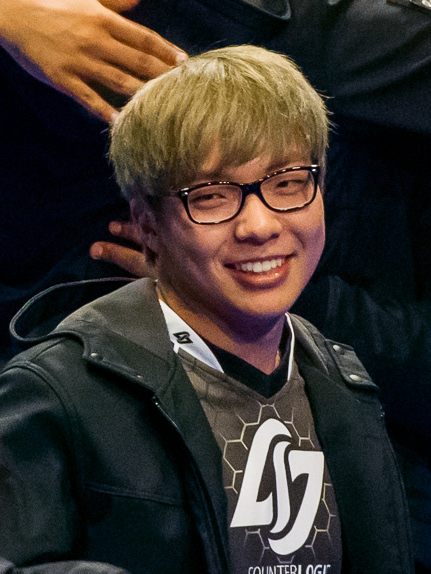
- Choi in 2016

Personal information
- Name: 최재현 (Choi Jae-hyun)
- Born: France
- Nationality: American (2023–present); Korean (1995–present)

Current team
- Team: Sentinels
- Role: Support
- Game: League of Legends
- League: LCS

Career information
- Playing career: 2014–present
- Role: Mid; Support

Team history
- 2014: Bigfile Miracle
- 2015: Team Fusion
- 2016–2018: Counter Logic Gaming
- 2019: 100 Thieves
- 2019–2020: Golden Guardians
- 2021– 2022: 100 Thieves
- 2023: Golden Guardians
- 2024: NRG
- 2025: Disguised
- 2026–present: Sentinels

Career highlights and awards
- 2× LCS champion (Spring 2016, Summer 2021)

Choi Jae-hyun (Korean: 최재현), better known as huhi, is a Korean-American professional League of Legends player for Sentinels of the LCS.

== Career ==
Huhi joined his first major team in North America when he became a member of Counter Logic Gaming in 2015. As CLG's mid laner, Huhi and his teammates won the 2016 NA LCS Spring Split Finals against Team SoloMid. He went on to place second at the 2016 Mid-Season Invitational. In November 2018, Huhi left CLG to play for 100 Thieves in the 2019 LCS Spring Split, but was released following the end of the regular season. Huhi played as a support for the Golden Guardians' academy team, which he joined before the start of the 2019 Summer Split. On July 5, 2019, he was promoted to the Golden Guardians' main roster, along with his AD carry, Victor "FBI" Huang.

100 Thieves announced on November 19, 2020, that it had acquired Huhi and Damonte from the Golden Guardians.

== Tournament results ==
=== Counter Logic Gaming ===
- 1st — 2016 NA LCS Spring Split Finals
- 2nd — 2016 Mid-Season Invitational
- 4th — 2016 NA LCS Summer regular season
- 4th — 2016 NA LCS Summer playoffs

=== 100 Thieves ===
- 4th - 2021 NA LCS Spring
- 1st - 2021 NA LCS Summer Split Finals

== Personal life ==
Huhi was born in France and has lived in South Korea, Dubai, and the United States. In December 2023, he posted on Twitter that he had received his United States citizenship.
