= 2024 LCS season =

- League: LCS
- Sport: League of Legends
- Duration: January 20 – March 31 (Spring) June 15 – September 7 (Summer)
- Teams: 8

Spring Split
- Champions: Team Liquid
- Runners-up: FlyQuest
- Top seed: FlyQuest
- Season MVP: Lim "Quid" Hyeon-seung

Summer Split
- Champions: FlyQuest
- Runners-up: Team Liquid
- Top seed: Team Liquid
- Season MVP: Jeong "Impact" Eon-young

LCS seasons
- ← 2023 2025 (LTA) →

The 2024 LCS season was the 12th season of the League Championship Series (LCS), a North American professional esports league for the video game League of Legends. The season was divided into two splits: Spring and Summer. The Spring Split ran from January 20 to March 31, and the Summer Split ran from June 15 to September 7, 2024. For the first time since 2014, the league had eight teams competing instead of 10.

The LCS was initially succeeded by the North Conference of the League of the Americas (LTA), but would only have one season in 2025. On 28 September 2025, Riot Games announced that the LCS would be reinstated starting in 2026.

== League changes ==
=== Teams ===
Following the 2023 season, TSM sold their LCS franchise slot to Shopify Rebellion. In addition, on November 19, 2023, Golden Guardians and Evil Geniuses exited the LCS, as their third-party administrator agreement with Riot Games was terminated. With not enough time to fill the two vacancies, the league announced that they would continue with eight teams for the 2024 season. The 2024 season marks the first time in a decade that the LCS had only eight teams competing in the league.

=== Commissioner ===
On December 13, 2023, Riot Games has announced that Mark "MarkZ" Zimmerman would be the new commissioner for the LCS. His appointment followed the departure of Jackie Felling, who stepped down from the commissioner position in summer 2023 due to health-related complications.

== Spring ==
The Spring Split regular season ran from January 20 to March 10, 2024. The regular season followed a double round-robin tournament format, with each team playing each other twice. All matches were best-of-one. The top six teams from the regular season advanced to the playoffs, with the top four teams starting in the upper bracket, and the following two starting in the lower bracket. The Spring Split Finals took place on March 31 at the Riot Games Arena in Los Angeles.

=== Regular season ===
Pos	Team	Pld	W	L	PCT	Qualification
1	FlyQuest	14	10	4	.714	Upper bracket semifinals
2	100 Thieves	14	10	4	.714	Upper bracket semifinals
3	Cloud9	14	8	6	.571	Upper bracket semifinals
4	Team Liquid	14	7	7	.500	Upper bracket semifinals
5	NRG Esports	15	7	8	.467	Lower bracket quarterfinals
6	Dignitas	15	6	9	.400	Lower bracket quarterfinals
7	Shopify Rebellion	14	5	9	.357	
8	Immortals	14	4	10	.286	

Source: LoL Esports

=== Playoffs ===
Upper semifinals	Upper final	Final
1	FlyQuest	3
4	Team Liquid	2
1	FlyQuest	3
3	Cloud9	0
2	100 Thieves	0
3	Cloud9	3
1	FlyQuest	1
Lower quarterfinals	Lower semifinals	Lower final	4	Team Liquid	3
2	100 Thieves	3
3	Cloud9	0
5	NRG Esports	2
2	100 Thieves	1	4	Team Liquid	3
4	Team Liquid	3
4	Team Liquid	3
6	Dignitas	0

=== Final standings ===
Pos	Team	Qualification
1	Team Liquid	2024 Mid-Season Invitational bracket stage
2	FlyQuest	2024 Mid-Season Invitational play-in stage
3	Cloud9	
4	100 Thieves	
5–6	NRG Esports	
5–6	Dignitas	

== Summer ==
=== Regular season ===
Pos	Team	Pld	W	L	PCT	Qualification
1	Team Liquid	7	7	0	1.000	Upper bracket semifinals
2	Cloud9	7	6	1	.857	Upper bracket semifinals
3	FlyQuest	7	5	2	.714	Upper bracket quarterfinals
4	Dignitas	7	3	4	.429	Upper bracket quarterfinals
5	100 Thieves	7	3	4	.429	Upper bracket quarterfinals
6	NRG Esports	7	2	5	.286	Upper bracket quarterfinals
7	Shopify Rebellion	7	1	6	.143	
8	Immortals	7	1	6	.143	

Source: LoL Esports

=== Playoffs ===
Upper quarterfinals	Upper semifinals	Upper final	Final
1	Team Liquid	3
4	Dignitas	0	5	100 Thieves	0
5	100 Thieves	3	1	Team Liquid	3
3	FlyQuest	2
2	Cloud9	1
3	FlyQuest	3	3	FlyQuest	3
6	NRG	1
1	Team Liquid	1
3	FlyQuest	3
Lower round 1	Lower quarterfinal	Lower semifinal	Lower final
3	FlyQuest	3
2	Cloud9	1	5	100 Thieves	0
5	100 Thieves	3	5	100 Thieves	3
4	Dignitas	3	4	Dignitas	2
6	NRG	2

Source: LoL Esports

=== Final standings ===
Pos	Team	Qualification
1	FlyQuest	2024 World Championship Swiss Stage
2	Team Liquid	2024 World Championship Swiss Stage
3	100 Thieves	2024 World Championship Play-In Stage
4	Cloud9	
5	Dignitas	
6	NRG	

== Awards ==
Spring

- Most Valuable Player: Quid, 100 Thieves
- Coaching Staff of the Split: 100 Thieves
- 1st Team All-Pro:
  - T Bwipo, FlyQuest
  - J River, 100 Thieves
  - M Quid, 100 Thieves
  - B Bvoy, Shopify Rebellion
  - S Busio, FlyQuest
- 2nd Team All-Pro:
  - T Impact, Team Liquid
  - J Inspired, FlyQuest
  - M Jojopyun, Cloud9
  - B Berserker, Cloud9
  - S Eyla, 100 Thieves
- 3rd Team All-Pro:
  - T Sniper, 100 Thieves
  - J Blaber, Cloud9
  - M Jensen, FlyQuest
  - B Massu, FlyQuest
  - S Vulcan, Cloud9

Summer

- Most Valuable Player: Impact, Team Liquid
- Coaching Staff of the Split: Team Liquid
- Most Improved Player: APA, Team Liquid
- Rookie of the Year: Massu, FlyQuest
- 1st Team All-Pro:
  - T Impact, Team Liquid
  - J Blaber, Cloud9
  - M APA, Team Liquid
  - B Yeon, Team Liquid
  - S CoreJJ, Team Liquid
- 2nd Team All-Pro:
  - T Thanatos, Cloud9
  - J Inspired, FlyQuest
  - M Jojopyun, Cloud9
  - B Berserker, Cloud9
  - S Vulcan, Cloud9
- 3rd Team All-Pro:
  - T Bwipo, FlyQuest
  - J UmTi, Team Liquid
  - M Quad, FlyQuest
  - B Massu, FlyQuest
  - S Busio, FlyQuest

== Broadcast ==
The LCS will return to Saturday and Sunday broadcasts after a year of weekday broadcasts. Riot Games announced the decision to revert to the original Saturday and Sunday broadcast days in response to widespread feedback from the North American League of Legends community. The move to Wednesday, Thursday, and Friday broadcasts in the previous year faced backlash from fans, contributing to a decline in overall viewership. The previous year saw a notable decrease in LCS viewership, reaching its lowest levels in peak viewership and average viewer counts over the last six seasons.
