= 2021 LCS season =

- League: LCS
- Sport: League of Legends
- Duration: January 15–31 (Lock In); February 5 – April 11 (Spring); June 4 – August 1 (Summer)
- Number of teams: 10
- TV partner(s): English: Twitch, YouTube

Lock In
- Winner: Team Liquid
- Runners-up: Cloud9

Spring
- Winner: Cloud9
- Runners-up: Team Liquid
- Top seed: Cloud9
- Season MVP: Robert "Blaber" Huang

Summer
- Winner: 100 Thieves
- Runners-up: Team Liquid
- Top seed: Team SoloMid
- Season MVP: Mingyi "Spica" Lu

LCS seasons
- ← 2020 2022 →

The 2021 LCS season was the ninth season of the League Championship Series (LCS), a professional esports league for the video game League of Legends. The season was preceded a new preseason tournament, the LCS Lock In, which ran from January 15 to 31, 2021. The season was divided into two splits: Spring and Summer. The Spring Split began on February 5 and culminated with the Mid-Season Showdown finals on April 11, 2021. The Summer Split began on June 4 and culminated with the LCS Championship Final on August 1, 2021.

In 2021, the LCS underwent significant changes. The spring split regular season became a six-week double round-robin, while the spring playoffs were renamed the Mid-Season Showdown. The summer split regular season expanded to a nine-week triple round-robin format. The spring and summer regular season records were combined to determine LCS Championship seeding. Additionally, the league rebranded as the League Championship Series and introduced a new logo and mottos.

Cloud9 won the spring split playoffs, qualifying them for the 2021 Mid-Season Invitational. In the LCS Championship playoffs, 100 Thieves, Team Liquid, and Cloud9 claimed the first, second, and third positions, respectively, earning qualifications to the 2021 World Championship.

== Format changes ==
The format of the LCS underwent significant changes for the 2021 season. The season introduced the "LCS Lock In," a three-week preseason tournament. The regular season expanded to five games a day over three days a week. The spring split regular season was changed to a double round-robin played over six weeks instead of nine, while maintaining the same number of games as the previous season. Additionally, the spring playoffs were rebranded as the Mid-Season Showdown (MSS). The summer split regular season was expanded to a triple round-robin format that took place over nine weeks. Additionally, the spring and summer regular season records were merged to determine the seeding for the LCS Championship at the end of the summer.

The league also rebranded from the League of Legends Championship Series into the League Championship Series ahead of the 2021 season. A new logo and two new mottos were introduced: Made by many and All for the game.

== Lock In ==
The inaugural LCS Lock In took place from January 15 to 31, 2021, as a three-week preseason tournament. The group stage team selection process began with the top-performing teams from the previous year, namely TSM from group A and FlyQuest from group B. These teams each selected squads to be placed in the opposing group. The Lock-In groups followed a round-robin format, where each team played every other team in their group once, with matches being best-of-one. The top four teams from each group advanced to the knockout stage. The quarterfinals in the knockout stage were contested in a best-of-three series, while the semifinals and final used a best-of-five format. The Lock In champion was awarded a prize of US$150,000, along with an additional $50,000 for a charity of their choice. Additionally, they gained the advantage of side selection for Game 5 of the regular season in case of tied head-to-head records.

=== Group stage ===
Group A

Pos	Team	Pld	W	L	PCT	Qualification
1	100 Thieves	4	3	1	.750	Advance to quarterfinals
2	Team Liquid	4	3	1	.750	Advance to quarterfinals
3	Team SoloMid	4	2	2	.500	Advance to quarterfinals
4	Golden Guardians	4	1	3	.250	Advance to quarterfinals
5	Counter Logic Gaming	4	1	3	.250	

Source: LoL Esports
Rules for classification: 1) Wins; 2) Head-to-head record

Group B

Pos	Team	Pld	W	L	PCT	Qualification
1	Evil Geniuses	4	3	1	.750	Advance to quarterfinals
2	Cloud9	4	3	1	.750	Advance to quarterfinals
3	FlyQuest	4	2	2	.500	Advance to quarterfinals
4	Immortals	4	1	3	.250	Advance to quarterfinals
5	Dignitas	4	1	3	.250	

Source: LoL Esports
Rules for classification: 1) Wins; 2) Head-to-head record

=== Knockout stage ===
Quarterfinals
A1	100 Thieves	2
B4	Immortals	0
B2	Cloud9	2
A3	Team SoloMid	1
B1	Evil Geniuses	2
A4	Golden Guardians	0
A2	Team Liquid	2
B3	FlyQuest	0

Semifinals
A1	100 Thieves	2
B2	Cloud9	3
B1	Evil Geniuses	0
A2	Team Liquid	3

Final
B2	Cloud9	2
A2	Team Liquid	3

== Spring ==
The Spring Split regular season ran from February 5 to March 14, 2021. The regular season followed a standard double round-robin format, where each team faced every other team twice. The playoffs ran from April 2 to 24, 2021. The top six teams from the Spring Split advanced to the Mid-Season Showdown (MSS), a double-elimination tournament. This format was similar to the 2020 Spring Playoffs, with the fifth and sixth seeds starting in the lower bracket. One change was the requirement for the first seed to face the fourth seed, and side selection favored the team that had most recently dropped from the upper bracket. Additionally, ties were resolved based on seeding. The winner of the MSS was awarded the first LCS title of 2021 and secured a spot at the 2021 Mid-Season Invitational.

The lower bracket final and grand final of the MSS took place at the Greek Theatre in Los Angeles, California.

=== Regular season ===
Pos	Team	Pld	W	L	PCT	Qualification
1	Cloud9	18	13	5	.722	Advance to upper semifinals
2	Team SoloMid	18	12	6	.667	Advance to upper semifinals
3	Team Liquid	18	12	6	.667	Advance to upper semifinals
4	100 Thieves	18	11	7	.611	Advance to upper semifinals
5	Dignitas	18	11	7	.611	Advance to lower quarterfinals
6	Evil Geniuses	18	10	8	.556	Advance to lower quarterfinals
7	Immortals	18	7	11	.389	
8	FlyQuest	18	6	12	.333	
9	Counter Logic Gaming	18	5	13	.278	
10	Golden Guardians	18	3	15	.167	

Source: LoL Esports (Archived March 18, 2021, at the Wayback Machine)

=== Mid-Season Showdown ===
==== Bracket ====
Upper round 1	Upper final	Final
1	Cloud9	3
4	100 Thieves	0
1	Cloud9	3
3	Team Liquid	1
2	Team SoloMid	1
3	Team Liquid	3
1	Cloud9	3
Lower round 1	Lower round 2	Lower final	3	Team Liquid	2
2	Team SoloMid	3
3	Team Liquid	3
6	Evil Geniuses	1
2	Team SoloMid	3	2	Team SoloMid	1
4	100 Thieves	1
4	100 Thieves	3
5	Dignitas	0

==== Final standings ====
Pos	Team	Qualification
1	Cloud9	2021 Mid-Season Invitational
2	Team Liquid	
3	Team SoloMid	
4	100 Thieves	
5–6	Dignitas	
5–6	Evil Geniuses	

=== Awards ===
- 1st Team All-Pro:
  - T Alphari, Team Liquid
  - J Blaber, Cloud9
  - M Perkz, Cloud9
  - B Zven, Cloud9
  - S CoreJJ, Team Liquid
- 2nd Team All-Pro:
  - T Impact, Evil Geniuses
  - J Santorin, Team Liquid
  - M PowerOfEvil, Team SoloMid
  - B FBI, 100 Thieves
  - S Vulcan, Cloud9
- 3rd Team All-Pro:
  - T Huni, Team SoloMid
  - J Dardoch, Dignitas
  - M Jensen, Team Liquid
  - B Neo, Dignitas
  - S SwordArt, Team SoloMid
- Most Valuable Player: Blaber, Cloud9
- Coaching Staff of the Split: Cloud9

== Summer ==
The Summer Split regular season ran from June 4 to August 1, 2021. The Summer Split regular season featured a triple round robin format, spanning nine weeks of play, where each team faced each other three times. The top eight teams with the highest combined regular season records from both spring and summer secured spots in the LCS Championship playoffs. The top two teams started in the upper bracket semifinals, the following four started in the upper bracket quarterfinals, and the remaining two started in the lower bracket. The LCS Championship playoffs, held from August 7 to 29, featured a double-elimination format. The top team from the playoffs was named the LCS champion, and the top three teams from the playoffs qualified for the 2021 League of Legends World Championship.

Initially, the LCS Championship lower bracket final and grand final were scheduled to be held at the Prudential Center in Newark, New Jersey. However, due to the increasing number of COVID-19 cases in the United States, these matches were relocated to the LCS Arena in Los Angeles, California, where they took place without a live audience.

=== Regular season ===
Pos	Team	Pld	W	L	PCT	Qualification
1	Team SoloMid	45	30	15	.667	Advance to upper semifinals
2	100 Thieves	45	29	16	.644	Advance to upper semifinals
3	Evil Geniuses	45	28	17	.622	Advance to upper quarterfinals
4	Cloud9	45	28	17	.622	Advance to upper quarterfinals
5	Team Liquid	45	27	18	.600	Advance to upper quarterfinals
6	Dignitas	45	23	22	.511	Advance to upper quarterfinals
7	Immortals	45	20	25	.444	Advance to lower round 1
8	Golden Guardians	45	14	31	.311	Advance to lower round 1
9	FlyQuest	45	14	31	.311	
10	Counter Logic Gaming	45	12	33	.267	

Source: LoL Esports (Archived October 8, 2021, at the Wayback Machine)

=== LCS Championship playoffs ===
==== Bracket ====
Upper round 1	Upper round 2	Upper final	Final
1	Team SoloMid	1
4	Cloud9	1	5	Team Liquid	3
5	Team Liquid	3	5	Team Liquid	3
2	100 Thieves	2
2	100 Thieves	3
3	Evil Geniuses	3	3	Evil Geniuses	2
6	Dignitas	1
5	Team Liquid	0
2	100 Thieves	3
Lower round 1	Lower round 2	Lower round 3	Lower final
1	Team SoloMid	3
6	Dignitas	0	7	Immortals	1	2	100 Thieves	3
7	Immortals	3	1	Team SoloMid	2	4	Cloud9	1
4	Cloud9	3
3	Evil Geniuses	0
4	Cloud9	3	4	Cloud9	3
8	Golden Guardians	0

==== Final standings ====
Pos	Team	Qualification
1	100 Thieves	2021 League of Legends World Championship
2	Team Liquid	2021 League of Legends World Championship
3	Cloud9	2021 League of Legends World Championship
4	Team SoloMid	
5–6	Evil Geniuses	
5–6	Immortals	
7–8	Dignitas	
7–8	Golden Guardians	

=== Awards ===
- 1st Team All-Pro:
  - T Fudge, Cloud9
  - J Spica, Team SoloMid
  - M Jiizuke, Evil Geniuses
  - B FBI, 100 Thieves
  - S CoreJJ, Team Liquid
- 2nd Team All-Pro:
  - T Impact, Evil Geniuses
  - J Closer, 100 Thieves
  - M Abbedagge, 100 Thieves
  - B Danny, Evil Geniuses
  - S huhi, 100 Thieves
- 3rd Team All-Pro:
  - T Huni, Team SoloMid
  - J Blaber, Cloud9
  - M PowerOfEvil, Team SoloMid
  - B Tactical, Team Liquid
  - S Vulcan, Cloud9
- Most Valuable Player: Spica, Team SoloMid
- Rookie of the Year: Danny, Evil Geniuses
- Most Improved Player: Fudge, Cloud9
- Coaching Staff of the Split: Evil Geniuses

== Broadcast ==
LCS regular season games were played on Fridays, Saturdays, and Sundays, with Fridays beginning at 3 pm PT and Saturdays and Sundays at 1 pm PT. A Spanish broadcast was produced by the LCS team FlyQuest.
