= Blaber (gamer) =

American professional esports player

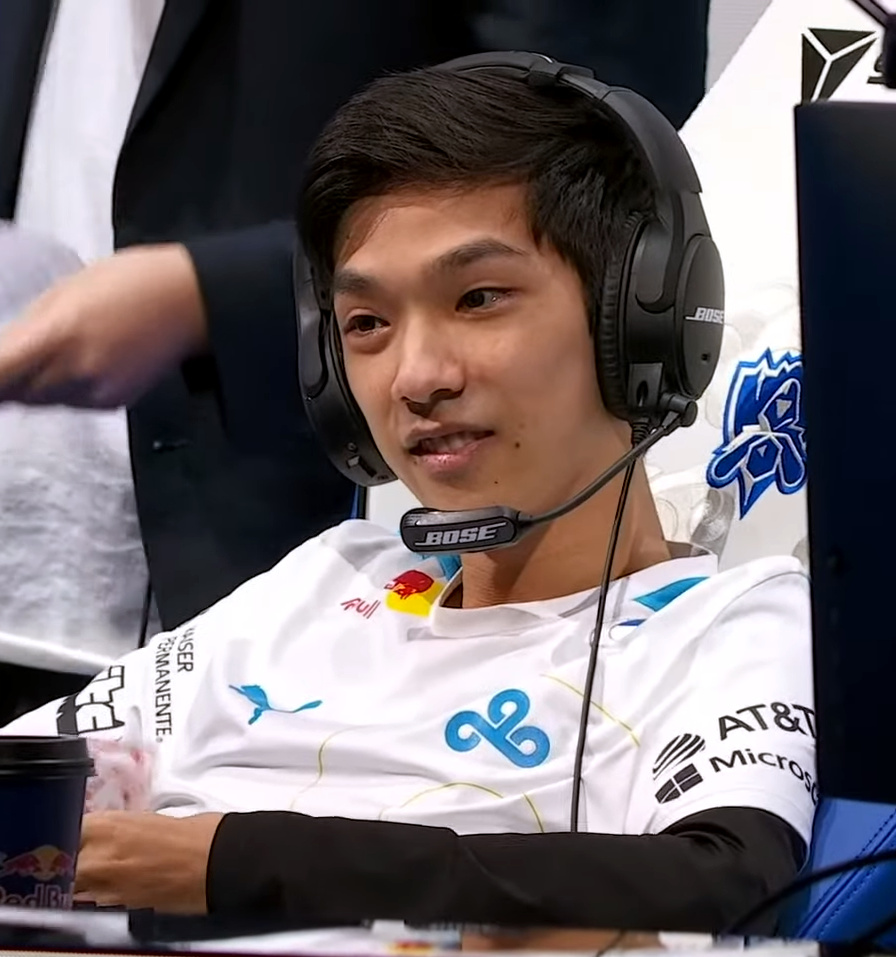
- Huang at the League of Legends World Championship 2021 in Iceland

Personal information
- Name: Robert Huang
- Born: January 4, 2000 (age 26)
- Nationality: American

Current team
- Team: Cloud9
- Role: Jungler
- Game: League of Legends
- League: LCS

Team history
- 2018–present: Cloud9

Career highlights and awards
- LCS Rookie of the Split (Summer 2018); 2× LCS MVP of the Split; 4× LCS champion; 6× LCS First-Team All Pro; LCS Third-Team All Pro

Robert Huang (born January 4, 2000), better known as Blaber, is an American professional League of Legends player for Cloud9. Huang is considered by many to be one of the best League of Legends players from North America. Huang was voted to both the League of Legends Championship Series Best Junglers and Best Players of All Time by a panel of experts as part of the LCS10 anniversary campaign.

== Early life ==
Huang was born and raised in Maryland and played competitive travel badminton until the age of 15. He began playing League of Legends in the season 1 beta at the age of 9. He followed League of Legends esports from an early age and was originally a fan of Doublelift and CLG.

== Career ==
Huang, then competing under the name "blaberfish2," was drafted by Cloud9 at the 2017 Scouting Grounds draft. A high school student at the time, Huang told the team that he wanted to finish school before pursuing a career in League of Legends. After graduating in 2018, Huang competed with Cloud9's academy team.

=== Early career as Cloud9 substitute (2018-2019) ===
After performing well with Cloud9's academy team, Huang was substituted into Cloud9's North American League of Legends Championship Series (NA LCS) roster in the 2018 NA LCS Summer Split over starting jungler Dennis "Svenskeren" Johnsen. After being regularly substituted into the NA LCS Cloud9 roster, the team lost only one match, going from last place in the league's standings to potentially receiving a first-round bye into the season playoffs. Throughout the season, Huang took on a sometimes-too-aggressive playstyle that "seemed to galvanize the team even when Svenskeren was brought back as the starter." After going 8–1 in the matches he played in the Summer Split, he received the league's Rookie of the Split award. In the playoffs, Cloud9 fell to a 1–2 deficit against Team SoloMid in the semifinals; after substituting Huang out of the lineup, the team won the final two matches to advance to the finals. In their finals match against Team Liquid, Cloud9 fell to Team Liquid 0–3, with neither of the team's junglers making much of an impact.

Throughout the 2019 LCS season, Huang continued his role as the team's secondary jungler behind Svenskeren. After struggling in their match against Hong Kong Attitude at the 2019 League of Legends World Championship, Cloud9 opted to start Huang in their match against G2 Esports the following day.

=== MVP and Championship seasons (2021-present) ===
In the off-season preceding the 2020 LCS season, Svenskeren left the team, citing that he did not want to split playing time with Huang. Throughout the 2020 Spring Split, Huang led the league amongst all junglers in multiple statistical categories, including experience differential, which was higher than all other junglers combined. For his performance throughout the split, Huang received the league's Most Valuable Player of the Split award. Cloud9 also went on to defeat FlyQuest in the Spring Split finals, marking Huang's first championship win. For the Summer split, Huang still performed well, taking 1st Team All Pro honors, again proving to be the best jungler in the league. However, in the playoffs, C9 was upset by FlyQuest, and then by TSM in the losers bracket, surprisingly missing Worlds 2020, the first time the Cloud9 organization had ever missed a Worlds.

In the Spring Split of the 2021 LCS season, Huang led the league in kills, assists, total team kill share, and damage, eventually winning his second MVP award. Cloud9 would also defeat Team Liquid in the Mid-Season Showdown, marking Huang's second championship win. At the 2021 Mid-Season Invitational, Huang struggled against tougher international competition, and with the changes in the meta, not performing up to the high expectations that were placed on him. C9 was eliminated in the "Rumble Stage" of the tournament, placing lower than expected. In the Summer Split, Huang regressed slightly from his MVP form in spring but remained a top player in the league. Huang was voted to the LCS 3rd team All Pro. Cloud9 finished the regular season 4th in the standings. After being sent to the losers bracket of the LCS Championship with a loss to Team Liquid; Cloud9 would go on to defeat Golden Guardians, Evil Geniuses, and TSM to qualify for Worlds before ultimately having their LCS season end with a loss to 100 Thieves. Huang and Cloud9 would start their run at the 2021 League of Legends World Championship with a disappointing loss to underdogs DetonatioN FocusMe in the play-in stage of the tournament. Cloud9 did win their subsequent play-in series and advanced to the group stage of the event, before again struggling in the group stage with an 0-3 record at the end of their first weak of play. The team would bounce back with strong performances from Huang and teammate Luka "Perkz" Perković and finish their group with a 3-4 record, advancing Huang to the knockout stage of Worlds for the first time in his career. Cloud9 was eliminated in the quarterfinals with a loss to Gen.G.

Cloud9 overhauled its roster before the start of the 2022 LCS season, with Huang being the only player on the team to return in the same position. Cloud9 would have a strong spring regular season finishing second in the standings and Huang once again making First-Team All Pro. Cloud9 struggled in the LCS spring playoffs, being eliminated in the lower bracket semifinals after winning only one playoff series. Cloud9 would again retool their roster before the summer split, with Huang reuniting with former teammates Nicolaj "Jensen" Jensen and Jesper "Zven" Svenningsen. Huang and the team finished the regular season in 5th, with Huang having a weaker summer season and did not make an LCS All Pro team for the first time in his career. Despite the weaker regular season Cloud9 would go on to win the summer championship without dropping a series, securing Huang his third domestic title. Huang advanced directly to the group stage of the 2022 League of Legends World Championship with Cloud9 qualifying as the first seed from the LCS. Huang and the team failed to remain competitive versus stronger international competition, only taking 1 game win before being eliminated from the tournament.

Huang and Cloud9 had continued domestic success in the 2023 LCS season. Cloud9 finished first in the regular season and Huang returned to First-Team All Pro and finished 3rd in MVP voting. Huang would win his fourth LCS title with Cloud9 after the team defeated Golden Guardians in the spring final. At the 2023 Mid-Season Invitational Huang would again struggle against international competition and was unimpressed with the team's level of play. Cloud9's only series win at the event was a rematch with LCS runner-up Golden Guardians. Huang would claim back-to-back First-Team All Pro nominations in the summer split. Huang would return to the world championship after Cloud9 finished second in the championship, losing to NRG in the LCS Championship Finals. Huang and Cloud9 were seeded into the Swiss stage at the 2023 League of Legends World Championship. Huang had a strong performance in the opening game versus MAD Lions but would be unable to continue that success for the rest of the event. Huang and team were eliminated from the event in the fourth round of the Swiss stage following a 2-1 loss to Fnatic.
