= Sentinels (esports) =

American professional esports organization

- Formerly: Phoenix1
- Type: Private
- Industry: Esports
- Founded: 2016
- Headquarters: Los Angeles, California, U.S.
- Key people: CEO: Rob Moore; Co-president: Eric Ma
- Parent: P1 Esports, LLC
- Divisions: 5: Valorant; Apex Legends; Halo; League of Legends; Marvel Rivals
- Website: Official website

Sentinels is an American esports organization based in Los Angeles, California. The organization was founded as the League of Legends team Phoenix1 and competed in the North American League of Legends Championship Series (NA LCS). In June 2018, Phoenix1 rebranded to Sentinels. The company currently fields teams in League of Legends, Valorant, Apex Legends, Marvel Rivals, and Halo.

== History ==
Phoenix1 was founded in May 2016 as a League of Legends team to compete in the North American League of Legends Championship Series (NA LCS). After the NA LCS became a franchised league, Phoenix1 sold its LCS spot. Following, Phoenix1 partnered with Kroenke Sports & Entertainment (KSE) to launch their Overwatch League franchised team Los Angeles Gladiators for the video game Overwatch. After successfully launching the Overwatch team, the company rebranded to Sentinels in June 2018. Sentinels opened two new divisions in 2018; in June 2018, they entered Hearthstone esports, and the following month, they began their Fortnite division.

In August 2019, Sentinels co-founder and CEO Rob Moore filed a lawsuit against KSE; Moore alleged that KSE purchased the organization Echo Fox without his knowledge. Following the suit, Sentinels split with KSE, leaving the latter as the sole owner of the Gladiators. In February 2020, Sentinels expanded into the competitive Halo scene. Two months later, they established their Valorant division.

== Divisions ==
=== Valorant ===
Sentinels began their Valorant division in April 2020, signing former Overwatch player Jay "sinatraa" Won and former Counter-Strike: Global Offensive players Shahzeb "ShahZaM" Khan, and Hunter "SicK" Mims, as well as bringing in Jared "zombs" Gitlin from their Apex Legends division. In June 2020, they rounded out their roster with the signing of Michael "dapr" Gulino. After sinatraa was suspended in 2021, Sentinels acquired Tyson "TenZ" Ngo on loan from Cloud9 in March of that year for Valorant Challengers Stage 1 and 2. Sentinels won the first international event in the Valorant competitive scene, VALORANT Champions Tour 2021: Stage 2 Masters – Reykjavík, without losing any map points. In June 2021, Sentinels fully acquired TenZ from Cloud9, buying out his contract. In September 2021, Sentinels finished 5th–8th place at the Valorant Champions Tour Stage 3: Masters Berlin after a defeat to Team Envy. Sentinels were eliminated from VALORANT Champions 2021 during group play by KRÜ Esports, which was regarded by many as the greatest upset till then in professional Valorant.

Sentinels signed Matt "Weltis" Liu as their analyst on July 22, 2022. On September 21, 2022, Sentinels was selected as a partner by Riot Games to compete in the Valorant Champions Tour Americas League for 2023. Sentinels overhauled their entire Valorant roster by letting go of Shahzeb "ShahZaM" Khan, Jordan "Zellsis" Montemurro, Michael "shroud" Grzesiek, and Eric "Kanpeki" Xu and replacing them with former XSET players, Zachary "zekken" Patrone and in-game leader Rory "dephh" Jackson, as well as 2022 Valorant Champions winners Gustavo "Sacy" Rossi and Bryan "pANcada" Luna. Sentinels also let go of their head coach Shane "Rawkus" Flaherty and replaced him with Don "SyykoNT" Muir as head coach and Adam "kaplan" Kaplan as a strategic coach. On March 13, 2023, Sentinels announced the signing of former OpTic Gaming player Jimmy "Marved" Nguyen, as a substitute. On April 17, 2023, SyykoNT announced his departure, promoting kaplan to head coach and Drew "DrewSpark" Spark-Whitworth as assistant coach. On May 9, 2023, Tyson "TenZ" Ngo returned to the active roster following a wrist injury. Following his return, dephh was let go and later replaced with Marved, who would compete with Sentinels for the remainder of the season as their in-game leader. Sentinels did not qualify for the Americas League playoffs, forcing them to compete in the Americas Last Chance Qualifier for 2023 Valorant Champions — of which they were then eliminated by Leviatán, putting their season to an end.

On September 13, 2023, Sentinels announced the signing of in-game leader Mohamed "johnqt" Ouarid. One day later, Sentinels re-signed Zellsis, now as their substitute player. Following the signing of Zellsis, Sentinels began a series of multiple off-season events culminating in their participation in the "AfreecaTV Valorant League" in Seoul, South Korea where they finished 1st place after beating Paper Rex. This was the last off-season event they participated in ahead of the 2024 season. As of February 9, 2024, Sentinels have moved pANcada to the bench and promoted Zellsis to the starting roster.

At the onset of the 2024 season, Sentinels beat out LOUD 3–2 in the grand final of the Americas Kickoff and qualified for Masters Madrid, as the number one seed representatives from the Americas region. Heading into Masters Madrid, where they faced off against two of the top teams from other regions, LOUD dominated the group stage with a close 2–1 victory over the hometown team, Team Heretics, and a 2–0 sweep over EMEA No. 1 seed Karmine Corp. They headed into the playoffs as the first team to qualify. They then beat LOUD once again in their first match, then lost to Gen.G in the upper finals. They were knocked down to the lower finals, where they faced an elimination match against Paper Rex. In a Bo5 series they won 3–1 over PRX and headed into the grand finals vs Gen.G; on March 24, 2024, they defeated Gen.G 3–2 in the grand final, earning the organization their second Masters trophy (and becoming the only organization to do so). As well, TenZ becomes the second player to have won two Masters titles, and Sacy becomes the first player to have won both a Champions and a Masters title.

Sentinels had a poor record in the subsequent Americas Stage 1, missing out on playoffs and being unable to qualify for Masters Shanghai. However, in the wake of Americas Stage 2, Sentinels recovered their performance and qualified for the playoffs; despite being eliminated early, they narrowly qualified for VCT Champions 2024 by accumulating the most Championship Points across the season. In the Champions 2024 group stage, after a rematch loss to tournament favorites Gen.G, they went on to defeat FunPlus Phoenix and later defeated Gen.G by a score of 2–0, eliminating the favorites and clinching their spot in the playoffs. They began their playoff run with a win against DRX, but in the ensuing loss to eventual tournament winners Edward Gaming, whom they were assumed to slightly favor to win against, Sentinels were sent to the lower bracket to face off against FNATIC. After a close 2–1 victory to FNATIC, Sentinels' run ended in the Top 4 as Team Heretics eliminated them 2–1 in the lower bracket.

On September 14, 2024, TenZ announced his retirement from Valorant competitive play after over four years of competing, removing his spot from the active roster. The following day, Sacy announced his retirement. Later that month, Sentinels signed Reduxx for the 2024 Red Bull Home Ground NA Qualifier, and Sentinels' substitute player, Rahul "curry" Nemani, would join the active roster for this event. They were eliminated by Cloud9 and did not qualify to the main event.

On October 7, 2024, Sentinels announced Marshall "N4RRATE" Massey and Sean "bang" Bezerra to the starting roster. The former had previously played for Karmine Corp, while the latter hails from 100 Thieves. On October 11, Yassine "reduxx" Aboulalazm was officially signed as the Sentinels' 6th man. The team would also acquire Luke "GUNTER" Clives as the assistant coach.

Sentinels began their 2025 campaign at VCT Americas Kickoff, which determined the region's representatives for Masters Bangkok. The team advanced through the upper bracket, defeating LOUD on January 31 to reach the upper-bracket final. After losing to G2 Esports, Sentinels defeated MIBR in the lower bracket to secure qualification for the international tournament.

On February 8, Sentinels faced G2 Esports in the grand final. Despite taking two maps, the team lost the best-of-five series 2–3, finishing as the tournament's runner-up. The result secured Sentinels a second-place finish at Kickoff and qualification for Masters Bangkok.

At Masters Bangkok, Sentinels competed in the Swiss stage against international teams. The team lost its opening match 0–2 to DRX before falling 1–2 to Team Liquid in the elimination round on February 23. The consecutive defeats resulted in a seventh–eighth-place finish, marking an early exit from the organization's first international event of the season.

Sentinels returned to regional competition for VCT Americas Stage 1. During the playoffs, the team defeated Cloud9 2–0 in the opening round, G2 Esports 2–1 in the upper-bracket semifinals, and MIBR 2–0 in the upper-bracket final to advance to the grand final. On May 4, Sentinels faced G2 Esports in a rematch of the Kickoff final but lost 1–3, finishing as the runner-up for the second consecutive regional tournament.

The second-place finish qualified Sentinels for Masters Toronto, where the team competed against international representatives from the other VCT regions. Sentinels advanced to the playoffs after competing in the Swiss stage, but their campaign ended in the lower bracket. After losing to Paper Rex, the team was eliminated by Fnatic on June 17 following a 1–2 defeat, finishing fifth–sixth overall.

In July, Sentinels competed at the 2025 Esports World Cup in Riyadh, Saudi Arabia. The team advanced from the group stage to the playoffs, where it faced Paper Rex in the quarterfinals on July 11. Sentinels lost the series 0–2 and finished the tournament in fifth–eighth place.

Sentinels began VCT Americas Stage 2 with a strong performance in the regular season, finishing first in Group A with an undefeated 5–0 record. The team advanced to the playoffs, where it defeated Cloud9 2–1 in the upper-bracket semifinals before losing 0–2 to G2 Esports in the upper-bracket final. Sentinels subsequently faced NRG in the lower-bracket final on August 30, losing 1–3 and finishing third overall.

The third-place finish secured Sentinels' qualification for VCT Champions 2025, held in Paris, France. This marked the team's third international VCT appearance of the season.

Sentinels entered VALORANT Champions 2025 in Group A alongside Paper Rex, GIANTX, and Xi Lai Gaming. The team opened its campaign against GIANTX on September 12, losing the series 1–2. Following the defeat, Sentinels faced Xi Lai Gaming in the elimination match on September 19. Despite taking the opening map, Sentinels lost the series 1–2 and were eliminated from the tournament in 13th–16th place.

The elimination marked the end of Sentinels' 2025 competitive season. Despite qualifying for all three international VCT events, the team did not win an international or regional championship during the year, with its best results being runner-up finishes at Americas Kickoff and Stage 1.

Following the conclusion of Champions Paris, Sentinels began restructuring its roster for the 2026 season. On October 22, the organization announced the departure of bang. Zellsis departed on October 28, followed by zekken on November 1, ending his three-year tenure with the organization.

On November 1, Sentinels announced its roster for the 2026 season, retaining johnqt and N4RRATE while promoting reduxx to the starting lineup. The organization also signed Gabriel "cortezia" Cortez from MIBR and Mirel "Kyu" Hrustemovic from Cubert Academy. The changes marked the end of the roster that had represented Sentinels throughout the 2025 season.

Following an underwhelming start to the season, Sentinels made significant mid-season changes. Head coach Adam "kaplan" Kaplan departed the team, alongside players Marshall "N4RRATE" Massey and Mirel "Kyu" Hrustemovic.

To address performance issues, Sentinels appointed Martin "Ewok" van der Walt as head coach and signed Jonah "JonahP" Pulice and Gurjiwan "Jerrwin" Gill to the active roster.

Sentinels competed in VCT Americas Stage 1 with a 2–3 record in the group stage, finishing ninth–tenth and failing to advance to the playoffs. The result continued the team's difficult start to the season following its early elimination from Kickoff.

Sentinels competed in the 2026 Esports World Cup Americas Qualifier in May. The team reached the final stage of the qualifier but finished in fifth–sixth place after losing 1–2 to LOUD on May 31, missing qualification for the main Esports World Cup tournament.

Sentinels entered VCT Americas Stage 2 seeking to recover from its earlier results. The team finished the group stage with a 2–3 record in Group Omega, placing fourth in the group and advancing to the play-in stage. It defeated LOUD 2–0 during the group stage but was unable to maintain consistency across the remaining matches.

In the play-in stage, Sentinels defeated 2Game Esports 2–0 but lost to ENVY and KRÜ Esports. The team finished seventh–eighth overall and failed to qualify for the playoffs. As a result, Sentinels did not qualify for any international VCT event during the 2026 season, ending its run of international appearances that had continued since 2024.

Following the conclusion of the 2026 season, Sentinels began rebuilding its roster for the 2027 VCT season. On September 15, JonahP and Jerrwin were moved to the inactive roster and permitted to explore opportunities with other teams. On October 30, the organization announced the departures of both Jerrwin and JonahP, ending their tenures with Sentinels after joining during the 2026 season.

Sentinels announced several additions in November. On November 2, the organization signed Francis "OXY" Hoang, followed by Brock "brawk" Somerhalder on November 3 and Alex "canezerra" Banyasz on November 6. On November 7, Jordan "Zellsis" Montemurro returned to the organization in a sixth-player role. Sentinels subsequently announced the departures of cortezia and reduxx on November 10.

On November 16, Sentinels signed British player Georgio "keiko" Sanassy, completing its starting lineup for the 2027 season. The announced roster consisted of johnqt, OXY, brawk, canezerra, and keiko, with Zellsis serving as the sixth player. Ewok remained head coach, while GUNTER continued as assistant coach.

==== Current roster ====
Sentinels Valorant roster
Players
Coaches

Handle	Name	Nationality
johnqt	Ouarid, Mohamed Amine	Morocco
OXY	Hoang, Francis	United States
brawk	Somerhalder, Brock	United States
canezerra	Banyasz, Alex	United States
keiko	Sanassy, Georgio	United Kingdom
Zellsis	Montemurro, Jordan	United States

Head coach

Martin "Ewok" van der Walt

Assistant coach(es)

Luke "GUNTER" Clives

Legend:
- (I) Inactive
- (S) Suspended
- Substitute
- (injured) Injury / Illness

Roster updated November 16, 2026.

=== Apex Legends ===
Sentinels entered the competitive Apex Legends scene on March 26, 2019, signing Morgan "Payne" Redfield Jr., Jared "zombs" Gitlin, and Nathan "xretzi" Telen to compete in the Twitch Rivals: Road to TwitchCon tournament. The organization later signed Adam "senoxe" Lau in June 2019. Sentinels won the Apex Legends tournament at TwitchCon San Diego in September 2019 and finished sixth at the Apex Legends Preseason Invitational that same month.

Following several roster changes, Sentinels continued competing in the Apex Legends Global Series (ALGS). The organization won the North American ALGS Split 1 Pro League in December 2021 and finished fourth at the Split 1 Playoffs in January 2022.>

In March 2023, Sentinels returned to the competitive scene by signing Cole "Rkn" Prommel, Beau "RamBeau" Sheidy, and Keon Berghout. Angello "Xenial" Cadenas joined the team in April, followed by Israel "Koyful" Lawrence in July. In November 2023, Sentinels signed Cody "Orioles" Palacorolla and coach Alex "coldjyn" Nicholls, while Koyful moved off the active roster. The organization subsequently parted ways with Orioles in February 2024, coldjyn in March, Rkn in April, and Xenial in May, leaving the team inactive.

Sentinels re-entered Apex Legends in May 2025, signing the former MPIRE Gaming roster consisting of Gabriel "Rileymekinac" Julien, Nicholas "LOTR31" Santay, and Carter Kain, alongside coach Justin "Voltic" Maunz and analyst Taunty. The team finished 12th at the 2025 ALGS Midseason Playoffs in July. In January 2026, Sentinels parted ways with the roster and its coaching and analytical staff.

On April 23, 2026, Sentinels announced its return to Apex Legends by signing the reigning ALGS Year 5 Championship-winning team Oblivion. The roster consisted of Miguel "Blinkzr" Quiles, Bowen "Monsoon" Fuller, and Brandon "FunFPS" Groombridge. Oblivion had won the 2026 ALGS Championship in Sapporo, Japan, in January, becoming the first team to win the championship after qualifying through the Last Chance Qualifier. Blinkzr was named the tournament's Most Valuable Player.

The newly signed roster finished third at the 2026 ALGS Split 1 Playoffs in July, earning $200,000 in prize money.

==== Current roster ====
Sentinels Apex Legends roster
Players
Coaches

Handle	Name	Nationality
Blinkzr	Quiles, Miguel	Canada
Monsoon	Fuller, Bowen	United States
FunFPS	Groombridge, Brandon	United States

Head coach

James "KIMCHILEE" Lee

Legend:
- (I) Inactive
- (S) Suspended
- Substitute
- (injured) Injury / Illness

Roster updated November 7, 2026.

=== League of Legends ===
For Phoenix1's inaugural, the team signed top laner Derek "zig" Shao, jungler Rami "Inori" Charagh, Sang-ook "Ryu" Yoo, bot laner Dong-hyeon "Arrow" No, and support Adrian "Adrian" Ma. Phoenix1 would miss out on NA LCS franchising for the 2018 season.

On October 10, 2025, Sentinels announced that they would return to the League Championship Series (LCS), taking over the slot previously held by 100 Thieves. On 5 December, the team announced its full roster for the 2026 LCS season.

==== Current roster ====
Sentinels League of Legends roster
Players
Coaches

Handle	Name	Nationality
Top	Impact	Jeong Eon-young	South Korea
Jungle	HamBak	Ham Yoo-jin	South Korea
Mid	DARKWINGS	Isaac Chou	United States
Bot	Rahel	Cho Min-seong	South Korea
Support	Huhi	Choi Jae-hyun	South Korea

Head coach

Greyson "Goldenglue" Gilmer

Assistant coach(es)

Mervin-Angelo "Dayos" Lachica

Legend:
- (I) Inactive
- (S) Suspended
- Substitute
- (injured) Injury / Illness

Roster updated December 5, 2025.

=== Marvel Rivals ===
The org entered the Marvel Rivals scene in March 2025; Sentinels signed several players who previously played for the Miami-based organization NTMR. Sentinels' last active roster was made up of Vanguard players Jacob "teki" Lebel-Frenette and William "Crimzo" Hernandez, Duelist players Jilani "Avery" Bouajila and Jimmy "nectar" Lebel-Frenette, and Strategist players Chassidy "aramori" Kaye and Steven "renko" Saucedo. They were coached by McGravy. On November 4, 2025, Sentinels announced that they were pausing their operations in Marvel Rivals and had released their entire roster.

== Former divisions ==
=== Fortnite ===
In July 2018, Sentinels began their Fortnite division after signing the players of the North American team TT. Included in the signings were Owen "Animal" Wright, Jaden "rieo" Leis, Mike "mikeqt" DeMarco, and Cayden "Carose" Bradford. In March 2019, Sentinels signed Kyle "Bugha" Giersdorf. On December 29, 2022, Sentinels announced their exit from competitive Fortnite after Bugha had won the Fortnite 2019 World Cup and FNCS Grand Championships in Chapter 2 Season 8, Grand Royale, and Chapter 3 Season 1 as a part of the organization.

=== Halo ===
Sentinels entered the Halo scene in February 2019, signing Halo veterans, previously of TOX Gaming, consisting of Paul "SnakeBite" Duarte, Tony "LethuL" Campbell Jr., Bradley "aPG" Laws, and Mathew "Royal2" Fiorante, with Chris "Royal1" Fiorante as their coach. In October 2020, Sentinels announced the signing of Bradley "Frosty" Bergstrom, a two-time Halo World Championship winner.

On January 13, 2023, SnakeBite, Royal2, Frosty, and Royal1 departed the organization. On the same day, Sentinels signed Kahari "Kuhlect" Miller, Tyler "Spartan" Ganza, Nick "KingNick" Panzella, and Kyle "Chig" Lawson. Exactly three months later, Kuhlect is released from the active roster, and a few days later on April 17 the organization signs Ayden "Suspector" Hill. A few months later on June 23, Suspector and KingNick depart the team, and Sentinels pick up Jesse "bubu dubu" Moeller and Michael "Falcated" Garcia.
