= FlyQuest =

Esports organization based in Los Angeles, US

- Short name: FLY
- Divisions: League of Legends; Super Smash Bros. Melee; Counter-Strike 2 Valorant
- Founded: January 6, 2017
- Based in: Corsico, Sardegna
- Location: Poggibonsi
- Stadium: Biagio bedstadium
- Owner: Chai
- President: Flyborg
- CEO: Filippo Francesco Meloni
- Head coach: Zeno Laera
- Manager: Jeffrey Hoang
- General manager: Nicholas Phan
- Website: www.flyquest.gg

FlyQuest is a professional esports organization based in the United States that was founded on January 6, 2017. It is owned by the Viola family, owners of the Florida Panthers.

FlyQuest was originally founded after the acquisition of the League of Legends roster of Cloud9 Challenger, which was the sister team of the Cloud9 organization. Cloud9 Challenger qualified for the North American League Championship Series in August 2016, alongside the main Cloud9 roster. LCS rules forbid an organization from owning multiple teams in the same league, so the team was sold to Milwaukee Bucks co-owner Wesley Edens and Fortress Investment Group and rebranded to FlyQuest, with the team roster unchanged.

Tricia Sugita was appointed as CEO in 2020, while Ryan Edens would move to a president position. She left the team on 13 June 2022, later becoming the Chief Marketing Officer for Cloud9. Michael Choi was appointed as the new CEO. In September 2022, the Viola family, owners of the Florida Panthers, acquired Flyquest. In December 2022, Brian Anderson was appointed as the new CEO. Australian gamer Chris “Papasmithy” Smith serves as president.

== League of Legends ==
=== Roster ===
FlyQuest League of Legends roster
Players
Coaches
#

Role	Handle	Name	Nationality
Top	Gakgos	Samet Bulut, İbrahim	Turkey
Jungle	Gryffin	Le, Johnson	United States
Mid	Quad	Song, Su-hyeong	South Korea
Bot	Massu	Abdulmalek, Fahad	Canada
Support	Cryogen	Luu, Michael	Vietnam

Head coach

Erlend "Nukeduck" Holm

Assistant coach(es)

Noh "Arrow" Dong-Hyeon
Alfonso "Mithy" Aguirre Rodríguez

Legend:
- (I) Inactive
- (S) Suspended
- Substitute
- (injured) Injury / Illness

Latest roster transaction: September 9, 2025.

=== Tournament results ===
Placement	Event	Final result (W–L)
5th	2017 NA LCS Spring Split	9–9
4th	2017 NA LCS Spring Playoffs	2–3 (against Phoenix1)
7th	2017 NA LCS Summer Split	6–12
3rd	2017 NA LCS Regional Qualifiers	1–3 (against Counter Logic Gaming)
8th	2018 NA LCS Spring Split	6–12
6th	2018 NA LCS Summer Split	10–8
5th–6th	2018 NA LCS Summer Playoffs	0–3 (against 100 Thieves)
4th	2019 LCS Spring Split	9–9
3rd–4th	2019 LCS Spring Playoffs	0–3 (against Team Liquid)
9th	2019 LCS Summer Split	5–13
4th	2020 LCS Spring Split	10–8
2nd	2020 LCS Spring Playoffs	0–3 (against Cloud9)
3rd	2020 LCS Summer Split	12–6
2nd	2020 LCS Summer Playoffs	2–3 (against Team SoloMid)
9-12th	2020 World Championship	3–3
5-8th	2021 LCS Lock-In	0–2 (against Team Liquid)
8th	2021 LCS Spring Split	6–12
9th	2021 LCS Summer Split	14–31
5-8th	2022 LCS Lock-In	0–2 (against Team Liquid)
6th	2022 LCS Spring Split	9–9
5-6th	2022 LCS Spring Split Playoffs	1–3 (against Evil Geniuses)
6th	2022 LCS Summer Split	9–9
7-8th	2022 LCS Summer Split Playoffs	2–3 (against TSM)
2nd	2023 LCS Spring Split	14–4
3rd	2023 LCS Spring Split Playoffs	0–3 (against Cloud9)
9th	2023 LCS Summer Split	6–12
1st	2024 LCS Spring Split	10–4
2nd	2024 LCS Spring Split Playoffs	1–3 (against Team Liquid)
9-10th	2024 Mid-Season Invitational	1–2
3rd	2024 LCS Summer Split	5–2
1st	2024 LCS Summer Split Playoffs	3–1 (against Team Liquid)
5-8th	2024 World Championship	2–3 (against Gen.G)
N/A	2025 LTA North Split 1	2–1
3rd-4th	2025 LTA Split 1 Playoffs	1–2 (against 100 Thieves)
2nd	2025 LTA North Split 2	6–1
1st	2025 LTA Split 2 Playoffs	3–1 (against Cloud9)
5-6th	2025 Mid-Season Invitational	2–3 (against Bilibili Gaming)

== Super Smash Bros. Melee ==
=== History ===
Super Smash Bros. Melee player John "KoDoRiN" Ko was signed by FlyQuest on December 8, 2021. Jake "Jmook" DiRado became the organization's second Melee player on June 10, 2022.

=== Current roster ===
FlyQuest Super Smash Bros. Melee roster
Players
Coaches

Handle	Name	Nationality
KoDoRiN	Ko, John	United States
JMook	DiRado, Jake	United States

Head coach

- Vacant

Legend:
- (I) Inactive
- (S) Suspended
- Substitute
- (injured) Injury / Illness

== Rocket League ==
FlyQuest made its first foray into Rocket League in September 2017, acquiring the eQuinox roster. This roster played in RLCS Season 4, finishing sixth in the regular season and missing out on a LAN spot after a 4–0 loss to Ghost Gaming in the regional playoffs. In the offseason between Seasons 4 and 5, FlyQuest dropped their first roster and picked up the Ambition Esports roster. This team finished first in RLRS league play for Season 5, earning them a spot in the promotional playoffs. They went on to defeat Out of Style and Counter Logic Gaming in the playoffs, earning them a spot in the RLCS for Season 6. FlyQuest finished fifth in league play, but again missed out on a LAN spot after losing to NRG in the regional playoffs. In December 2018, FlyQuest announced that they would be dropping their Rocket League roster, with AyyJayy and Wonder being transferred to Rogue and Pluto staying with the organization as a content creator.

=== Tournament results ===
- Qualified for RLCS Season 4 league play by defeating Renegades 3–2 during the RLCS Season 4 North America Play-In
- Qualified for RLCS Season 6 league play by defeating Counter Logic Gaming 4–2 during the RLCS Season 5 Promotional Tournament

== Counter-Strike 2 ==
On March 28, 2024, FlyQuest announced the signing of the Australian previous Grayhound Gaming roster, consisting of Alistair "aliStair" Johnston, Christopher "dexter" Nong, Joshua "INS" Potter, Jay "Liazz" Tregillgas, and Declan "Vexite" Portelli.

=== Roster ===
FlyQuest Counter-Strike 2 roster
Players
Coaches

Handle	Name	Nationality
nettik	Browne, Corey	New Zealand
jks	Savage, Justin	Australia
INS	Potter, Joshua	Australia
Vexite	Portelli, Declan	Australia
story	Vieira, João	Portugal
regali (I)	Harjău, Iulian	Romania

Head coach

Aaron "AZR" Ward

Legend:
- (I) Inactive
- (S) Suspended
- Substitute
- (injured) Injury / Illness

FlyQuest RED Counter-Strike 2 roster
Players
Coaches

Handle	Name	Nationality
GooseBreeder	Dobie, Mounira	Canada
BiBiAhn	Quach, Vivienne	Australia
Kaoday	Le Floc'h, Coline	France
emy	Choe, Emma	United States
vanessa	Gideon, Vanessa	United States

Head coach

Luca "Munstur" Ioanițiu

Assistant coach(es)

Alan "Shakezullah" Hardeman

Legend:
- (I) Inactive
- (S) Suspended
- Substitute
- (injured) Injury / Illness
