= League Championship Series (esports) =

Former professional League of Legends esports league

- Current season, competition or edition: 2026 LCS season
- Formerly: North American League of Legends Championship Series (2013–2018); League of Legends Championship Series (2019–2020); League of Legends Championship of The Americas North (2025 only)
- Game: League of Legends
- Founded: August 6, 2012; 14 years ago
- First season: 2013
- Owner: Riot Games
- Commissioner: Mark Zimmerman
- No. of teams: 8
- Region: North America
- Venues: Riot Games Arena, Los Angeles
- Most recent champion: Team Liquid Alienware (6th title) (LCS Summer 2026)
- Most titles: Team SoloMid (7 titles)
- Qualification: Franchise partnership
- Relegation to: Guest teams only: Liga Regional Norte (Northern LATAM); North American Challengers League (NA)
- International cups: First Stand Tournament; Mid-Season Invitational; World Championship
- Related competitions: CBLOL, LCK, LCP, LEC, LPL
- Website: www.lolesports.com

The League Championship Series (LCS) is the top level of professional League of Legends in the United States, Canada and Northern Latin America. The esports league is run by Riot Games. Each annual season of competition is divided into three splits, which conclude with a double-elimination tournament between the top teams. At the end of each split, the top teams qualify for international tournaments, currently First Stand, the Mid-Season Invitational and the World Championship.

Established in 2013, the league was initially split into two regions: the European League of Legends Championship Series (EU LCS) and the North American League of Legends Championship Series (NA LCS). The NA LCS featured eight teams, which were determined via a promotion and relegation system. In 2015, the league expanded to ten teams. In 2018, the NA LCS shifted to a franchise system with ten permanent teams, which became eight after the 2023 season. Along with the new model, the league rebranded to simply the League of Legends Championship Series, aligning with the EU LCS's change to League of Legends European Championship, creating unique identities for major regions. The franchise era of the LCS has witnessed several team sales and rebranding efforts. The 2020 season introduced format changes and had to adapt to online play due to the COVID-19 pandemic. In 2021, the LCS again rebranded to the League Championship Series. The 2023 season saw controversy with the LCS Players Association (LCSPA) threatening a player walkout over financial support for teams in the North American Challengers League (NACL).

For the 2025 season, the LCS merged with the Campeonato Brasileiro de League of Legends (CBLOL) and Liga Latinoamérica (LLA) to form the League of Legends Championship of The Americas (LTA). During the lone LTA season, the LCS name was retired and became the LTA North as one of the league's two conferences. The LCS returned as a standalone league in 2026, retiring the LTA name in return.

With the exception of some touring events, all games of the LCS are played live at the Riot Games Arena in Los Angeles, California. In addition to a small studio audience, all games are streamed live on Twitch and YouTube.

== History ==
=== Origins and early years ===
Prior to the formation of the North American League of Legends Championship series, League of Legends had a growing competitive scene, but a professional league was not a central component of Riot Games' initial business strategy. However, in 2011, professional organized league play became a prominent point of emphasis for Riot after the company hosted its inaugural championship tournament at DreamHack.

On August 6, 2012, Riot Games announced the formation of the League of Legends Championship Series (LCS), a professional gaming league designed to provide support to teams from Europe, Asia, and the United States. The inaugural season of the LCS commenced on February 7, 2013, coinciding with the third season of professional play in League of Legends. As such, it was designated as "Season 3". It was split two regional leagues: the European League of Legends Championship Series (EU LCS) and the North American League of Legends Championship Series (NA LCS). Within these leagues, eight teams representing their respective regions engaged in regional competitions. The top teams in each region advanced to the League of Legends World Championship. The league was not profitable throughout its first season. At the end of 2013, Riot announced a Challenger league, later known as the League of Legends Challenger Series (CS). The league was established with the purpose of serving as a platform for developing talent and providing an opportunity for Challenger-level teams to participate in the LCS via a promotion and relegation system.

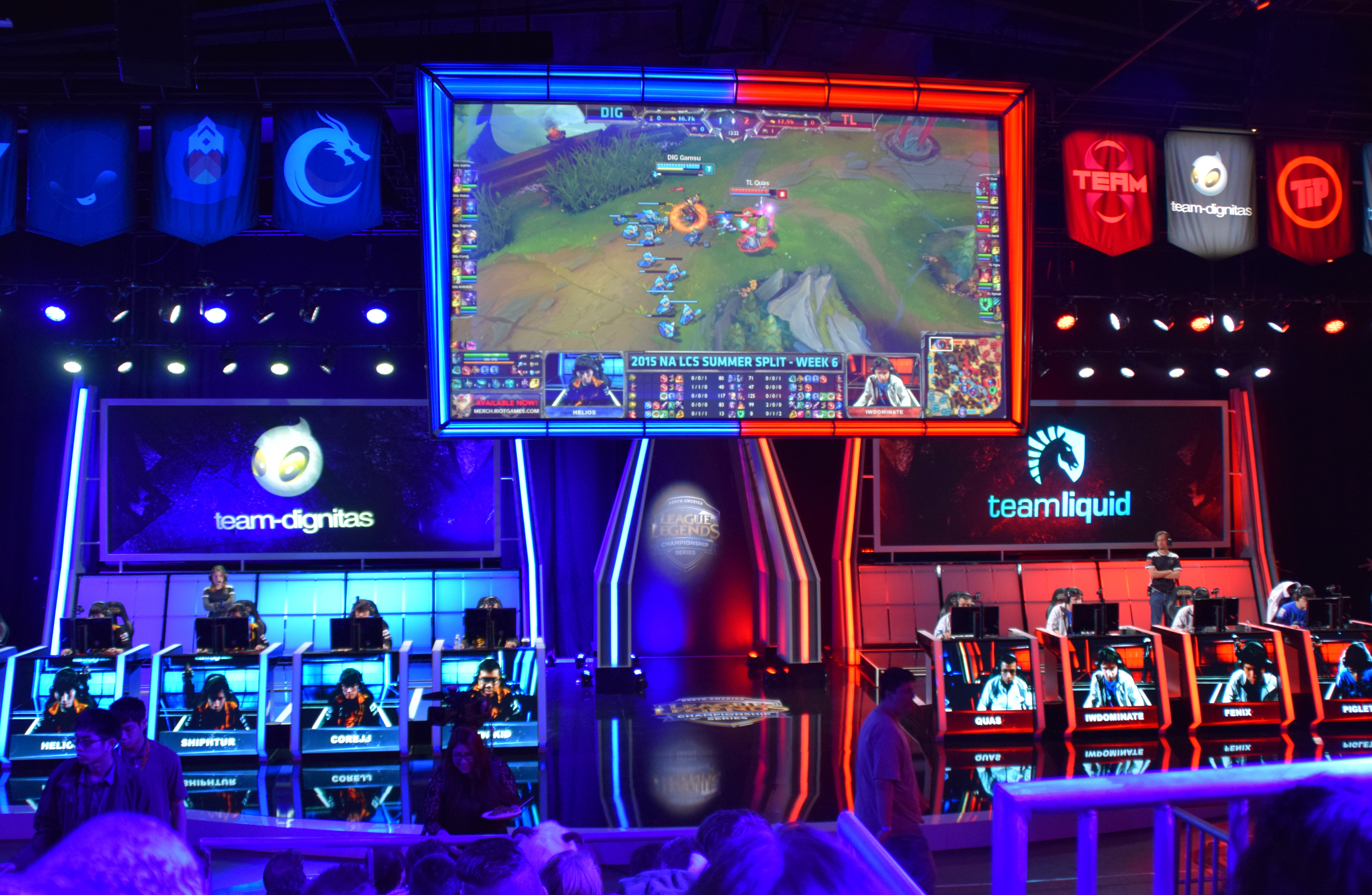
A match during the 2015 NA LCS summer split

Heading into the 2015 season, an expansion tournament was held in both Europe and North America that added two teams in each region, giving the LCS a total of 10 teams per region. Additionally, Riot introduced the concept of "Championship points", which teams would earn based on performance across both splits and playoffs in order to qualify for the World Championship. A new sale of sponsorship rule was instated for the 2015 season, prohibiting companies that facilitated sponsorships for LCS teams from also possessing the branding of those LCS teams. Notably, the GoodGame Agency held ownership of both Europe's Alliance and North America's Evil Geniuses while simultaneously managing sponsorships for both teams. Consequently, in compliance with this new regulation, these teams underwent rebranding, adopting the names Elements and Winterfox, respectively. Furthermore, Curse Inc. faced restrictions on sponsoring LCS team Team Curse, leading to a comprehensive merger of the entire esports organization under the banner of Team Liquid. The league's first female player, Maria "Remilia" Creveling, also joined the league in the 2015.

On May 8, 2016, Riot Games took a series of punitive actions against NA LCS teams Team Impulse and Renegades, along with Challenger Series team Team Dragon Knights. These actions effectively banned these teams from participating in any future sanctioned League of Legends contests due to several infractions, including neglecting player payments, mistreatment of players, and withholding information that would have rendered the teams ineligible for competition. In addition to these sanctions, it was found that, during trade requests between Renegades and Team Dragon Knights, both organizations provided misleading information to League officials regarding the independence of the two teams and the status of players and payments. The evidence indicated that some players continued to be compensated and housed by their former teams even after the trade had been completed. As a result of these actions, former Renegades owner Chris Badawi was permanently banned from participating in Riot-sanctioned leagues, and Christopher Mykles was banned from holding any Riot-sanctioned position within a competing organization for one year. The three teams were given until May 18 to sell all rights and legal claims to their LCS/CS berths.

=== Franchised era ===
In June 2017, Riot Games announced that the NA LCS would shift from a promotion and relegation system to franchised league with ten permanent teams beginning in 2018. Each of the ten teams would have guaranteed spots, which would encourage owners to make substantial investments, including the creation of training facilities and improvements in coaching, scouting, and player well-being. Each team was also mandated to maintain an academy squad for emerging talent development. Riot Games also raised the minimum salary for players to US$75,000, with an average annual income for League pros around $150,000. Additionally, a players' association was established to offer financial, legal, and career-building support to players. The buy-in price for the league was $10 million for existing League of Legends teams, who had previously participated in the League Championship Series or Challenger Series. New teams would be subject to an additional $3 million, which was distributed to the teams that were replaced in the league. The NA LCS received over 100 applications for a spot in the league. The ten franchised teams were announced in November 2017. Among the already established teams in the NA LCS were FlyQuest, Team SoloMid, Cloud9, Counter Logic Gaming, Echo Fox, and Team Liquid, while the newly admitted teams to the NA LCS were 100 Thieves, Clutch Gaming, Golden Guardians, and OpTic Gaming.

LCS logo from 2019 to 2020

In December 2018, the NA LCS re-branded its name to simply the LCS and with updated their logo. The change aligned with the EU LCS's name change to the League of Legends European Championship (LEC) earlier that year. Following the EU LCS's transition to LEC, all major regions in the competitive world of League of Legends had a unique name, logo, and brand identities. The changes were made to establish distinct identities for every regions.

The league saw several franchise sales in 2019. In June, the parent company of Dignitas announced that they had partnered with the Houston Rockets to acquire Clutch Gaming for reportedly over $30 million, marking the first-ever merger involving a League of Legends franchise in the LCS. In May, Riot Games issued a 60-day ultimatum to Echo Fox, demanding the removal of co-founder and shareholder Amit Raizada from their cap table. This action was prompted after it was revealed that Raizada had used racist language directed at former Echo Fox CEO Jace Hall during an email exchange, and in another email, Raizada also made threats against the family of Echo Fox's owner, Rick Fox. When Echo Fox failed to comply with Riot's directive, Riot Games forced Echo Fox to sell its LCS franchise. After a failed attempt to sell the franchise to Kroenke Sports & Entertainment, Echo Fox agreed to allow Riot Games to handle the sale process. In September, Evil Geniuses acquired Echo Fox's LCS slot for $33 million.

Before the 2020 season, the league implemented a series of format changes. The league removed the "Championship points" system introduced in 2015. In this new structure, victories during the spring splits would solely serve to qualify a team for the Mid-Season Invitational. The regional qualifying tournament, which was used to advance teams to the World Championship, was also eliminated. Instead, the top three teams from the summer split playoffs earned the right to advance to the World Championship. The LCS also implemented a revised schedule for the 2020 season, featuring broadcasts of matches on Monday evenings called "Monday Night League" in addition to their regularly scheduled Saturday and Sunday broadcasts. In response to the COVID-19 pandemic, LCS commissioner Chris Greeley announced the suspension of the 2020 season on March 13, 2020, with no definite timeframe for resumption. Subsequently, the LCS resumed its competitions through online play, starting on April 18, 2020. The league decided to discontinue Monday Night League in May 2020 due to low viewership. Instead, the league extended its broadcasts to include Friday evenings.

The league rebranded from the League of Legends Championship Series into the League Championship Series ahead of the 2021 season. A new logo and two new mottos were introduced: Made by many and All for the game. The LCS expanded the 2021 season to include a preseason tournament called the LCS Lock-In. The league also merged the regular season of the spring and summer splits. Team's spring split regular season record qualified them for the LCS Mid-Season Showdown, which itself would be a qualifier for the Mid-Season Invitational. Regular season records over both spring and summer would be used to seed teams into the LCS Championship tournament, with the top three teams from there moving on to the World Championship. For the 2022 season, the league returned to the previous regular season format, with each split's records being confined to that specific split.

In the 2023 season, another franchise sale took place when NRG Esports acquired Counter Logic Gaming, assuming control of its LCS slot. The 2023 season also saw the LCS Players Association (LCSPA) threaten a player walkout. In May of that year, Riot Games announced plans to remove the requirement for LCS teams to financially support North American Challengers League (NACL) teams, citing the need to provide more operational and financial flexibility to LCS teams. This change, effective from the 2023 Summer Split, led most LCS franchises to disband their development rosters. In response, the LCSPA threatened a player walkout to support affected individuals, viewing Riot's decision as unprecedented and contradictory to earlier assurances. The LCSPA demanded Riot's support for the NACL, citing successful second-tier leagues in other regions. The walkout vote passed, resulting in the first major esports league strike. Riot responded by delaying the start to the 2023 Summer Split, stipulating that if both parties could not reach an agreement within the designated two-week period, the Summer Split would be cancelled and no teams would be eligible for the 2023 World Championship. A deal was reached on June 8, establishing a new NACL business model with a 50/50 revenue split, governance improvements, minimum player notice and severance requirements, and healthcare insurance reinforcement. Riot also provided a one-time payment to Rally Cry, the NACL organizer, and emphasized cost-sharing between LCS and NACL teams.

Prior to the start of the 2024 season, TSM sold their franchise slot to Shopify Rebellion. In addition, on November 19, 2023, Golden Guardians and Evil Geniuses exited the LCS, as their third-party administrator agreement with Riot Games was terminated. With not enough time to fill the two vacancies, the league announced that they would continue with eight teams for the 2024 season.

=== LTA merger, dissolution and reinstatement of LCS ===
On June 11, 2024, Riot Games announced that the LCS, Brazil's Campeonato Brasileiro de League of Legends (CBLOL) and the Liga Latinoamérica (LLA) would form a pan-American league, later known as the League of Legends Championship of The Americas, that would begin play in 2025. Under this new model, six of the eight existing LCS teams would remain partnered and form a new North Conference (later named "LTA North"), joined by a team from northern Latin America and a guest slot, which would be determined by a promotion and relegation tournament after 2025, thus retiring the LCS name. Of the 8 teams in the Summer 2024 split of the LCS, Immortals and NRG left the league and were replaced by Lyon (as the LLA partner for northern Latin America) and Disguised (as the guest slot). In addition, 100 Thieves were reclassified as a "provisional guest team" and would leave League esports after the 2025 season when a new partner was found for 2026.

On September 28, 2025, during the LTA Championship between the North's FlyQuest and the South's Vivo Keyd Stars, Riot Games announced that they would reinstate the LCS as an independent league and discontinue the LTA name beginning in 2026. The next day, Riot confirmed that the LCS would get the LTA's international spots and that a simpler format would be used for each split due to the lack of "cross-conference" play like in the LTA.

== Format ==
In the year before the LTA merger, the LCS featured eight North American teams who competed in two seasonal splits, spring and summer. The regular season of the spring split adopted a round-robin format with best-of-one matches, with the Summer split using single round-robin best-of-three matches. In both splits, the top six regular season teams progressed to the double-elimination spring playoffs. The spring split had the top four in the upper bracket and the bottom two in the lower bracket, with the spring playoffs champions and runner-up qualifying as the North American representatives for the Mid-Season Invitational, while the summer split had all six teams placed in the upper bracket, with the top seed being to choose their second round opponent like in the LCK. In addition, the lower bracket was staggered, with the first round losers facing each other and the second round losers entering in different rounds based on their seed. The winner of the summer champions were crowned LCS Champions, with the top three teams qualifying as the North American representatives for the World Championship. For both split playoffs, all matches were played in a best-of-five format.

Following Riot Games' announcement of a new split structure and competitive calendar for League of Legends esports beginning with the 2025 competitive season and the reinstatement of the LCS, the league's format aligned with the changes, with a new Lock-In tournament instituted and Spring and Summer each maintaining a best-of-three regular season format into double elimination playoffs. As for slots to international tournaments, the winner of the first split will qualify for the First Stand Tournament, a new international competition that began in 2025 (the sole year of the LTA's existence), as the league's lone representative. The finalists of the second split will qualify for the Mid-Season Invitational, while the top three teams in the third split will qualify as the North American representatives for the League of Legends World Championship.

== Current teams ==
Italics indicate a guest team that can be relegated to the North American Challengers League (NACL) or Liga Regional Norte (LRN).

Teams	First appearance in the LCS	Roster					Coach
Teams	First appearance in the LCS	Top	Jungle	Mid	Bot	Support	Coach
Cloud9	2013 Summer	Thanatos	Blaber	APA	Zven	Vulcan	Inero
Disguised	2025 Split 1 (LTA)	Castle	KryRa	Callme	Sajed	Lyonz	ido
FlyQuest	2017 Spring	Gakgos	Gryffin	Quad	Massu	Cryogen	Thinkcard
LYON	2025 Split 1 (LTA)	Dhokla	Inspired	Saint	Berserker	Isles	Reignover
OpTic Gaming (Note: OpTic Gaming's slot in the LCS is run as a partnership with Dignitas, who own the slot; as part of the partnership, Riot Games manages the Dignitas/OpTic slot.)	2018 Spring	Photon	eXyu	Palafox	FBI	Eyla	Swiffer
Sentinels	2016 Summer (Note: As Phoenix1; Sentinels re-entered the LCS in 2026.)	Impact	HamBak	DARKWINGS	Rahel	Huhi	Goldenglue
Shopify Rebellion	2024 Spring	Fudge	Contractz	Zinie	Bvoy	Ceos	Reven
Team Liquid (Note: Known for sponsorship reasons as Team Liquid Alienware.)	2015 Spring	Morgan	Josedeodo	Quid	Yeon	CoreJJ	Spawn

== Seasons ==
Year	Season	Top seed	Record	Champion	Runner-up	No.
2013	Spring	Team SoloMid	21–7 (.750)	Team SoloMid	Good Game University	8
2013	Summer	Cloud9	25–3 (.893)	Cloud9	Team SoloMid	8
2014	Spring	Cloud9	24–4 (.857)	Cloud9	Team SoloMid	8
2014	Summer	Cloud9	18–10 (.643)	Team SoloMid	Cloud9	8
2015	Spring	Team SoloMid	13–5 (.722)	Team SoloMid	Cloud9	10
2015	Summer	Team Liquid	14–5 (.737)	Counter Logic Gaming	Team SoloMid	10
2016	Spring	Immortals	17–1 (.944)	Counter Logic Gaming	Team SoloMid	10
2016	Summer	Team SoloMid	17–1 (.944)	Team SoloMid	Cloud9	10
2017	Spring	Team SoloMid	15–3 (.833)	Team SoloMid	Cloud9	10
2017	Summer	Team SoloMid	14–4 (.778)	Team SoloMid	Immortals	10
2018	Spring	100 Thieves	13–6 (.684)	Team Liquid	100 Thieves	10
2018	Summer	Team Liquid	12–6 (.667)	Team Liquid	Cloud9	10
2019	Spring	Team Liquid	14–4 (.778)	Team Liquid	Team SoloMid	10
2019	Summer	Team Liquid	14–4 (.778)	Team Liquid	Cloud9	10
2020	Spring	Cloud9	17–1 (.944)	Cloud9	FlyQuest eSports	10
2020	Summer	Team Liquid	15–3 (.833)	Team SoloMid	FlyQuest eSports	10
2021	Spring	Cloud9	13–5 (.722)	Cloud9	Team Liquid	10
2021	Summer	Team SoloMid	30–15 (.667)	100 Thieves	Team Liquid	10
2022	Spring	Team Liquid	14–4 (.778)	Evil Geniuses	100 Thieves	10
2022	Summer	Evil Geniuses	15–3 (.833)	Cloud9	100 Thieves	10
2023	Spring	Cloud9	15–4 (.789)	Cloud9	Golden Guardians	10
2023	Summer	Cloud9	14–5 (.737)	NRG Esports	Cloud9	10
2024	Spring	FlyQuest	10–4 (.714)	Team Liquid	FlyQuest	8
2024	Summer	Team Liquid	7–0 (1.000)	FlyQuest	Team Liquid	8
2025	No season — replaced by LTA North					8
2026	Lock-In	Cloud9 KIA	6–1 (.857)	LYON	Cloud9 KIA	8
2026	Spring	Cloud9 KIA	7–0 (1.000)	LYON	Team Liquid Alienware	8
2026	Summer	LYON	6–1 (.857)	Team Liquid Alienware	LYON	8

== Championships ==
Team	Win	Loss	Total	Split(s) won	Split(s) runner-up
Team SoloMid†	7	5	12	2013 Spring, 2014 Summer, 2015 Spring, 2016 Summer, 2017 Spring, 2017 Summer, 2020 Summer	2013 Summer, 2014 Spring, 2015 Summer, 2016 Spring, 2019 Spring
Cloud9	6	8	14	2013 Summer, 2014 Spring, 2020 Spring, 2021 Spring, 2022 Summer, 2023 Spring	2014 Summer, 2015 Spring, 2016 Summer, 2017 Spring, 2018 Summer, 2019 Summer, 2023 Summer, 2026 Lock-In
Team Liquid	6	4	10	2018 Spring, 2018 Summer, 2019 Spring, 2019 Summer, 2024 Spring, 2026 Summer	2021 Spring, 2021 Summer, 2024 Summer, 2026 Spring
LYON	2	1	3	2026 Lock-In, 2026 Spring	2026 Summer
Counter Logic Gaming†	2	0	2	2015 Summer, 2016 Spring	—
100 Thieves†	1	3	4	2021 Summer	2018 Spring, 2022 Spring, 2022 Summer
FlyQuest	1	3	4	2024 Summer	2020 Spring, 2020 Summer, 2024 Spring
NRG Esports	1	0	1	2023 Summer	—
Evil Geniuses†	1	0	1	2022 Spring	—
Good Game University†	0	1	1	—	2013 Spring
Immortals	0	1	1	—	2017 Summer
Golden Guardians†	0	1	1	—	2023 Spring

† Denotes a team that is no longer in League of Legends

== Media coverage ==
The LCS primarily connects with its audience through online streaming via dedicated channels on platforms such as Twitch and YouTube. Games in 2013 drew in more that 1.7 million unique viewers. While regular season viewership on Twitch approached nearly 300,000 peak viewers in 2014 at times, recent years leading up to 2023 saw a consistent decline. For instance, the 2023 LCS Summer finals reached a peak of just over 223,000 viewers, marking a decrease of around 50,000 viewers compared to the previous split's finals and a decrease of 150,000 viewers compared to the summer 2022 finals.

Riot Games CEO Brandon Beck stated in 2012 that there were no immediate plans to try to bring the LCS to traditional TV, and news coverage of the regular season were generally limited to dedicated electronic sports news sites. In December 2016, Riot announced that it had reached a deal with BAMTech (a spin-off of MLB Advanced Media) to serve as the exclusive distributor of LCS broadcasts through 2023. BAMTech would have paid $50 million per-year under the contract, and split advertising revenue with Riot. However, internal complications arose after The Walt Disney Company acquired BAMTech, and the contract never actually took effect. As a substitute, Riot entered into an agreement to non-exclusively carry its broadcasts on ESPN+ instead, in addition to existing outlets such as Twitch.
