= CoreJJ =

South Korean esports player (born 1994)

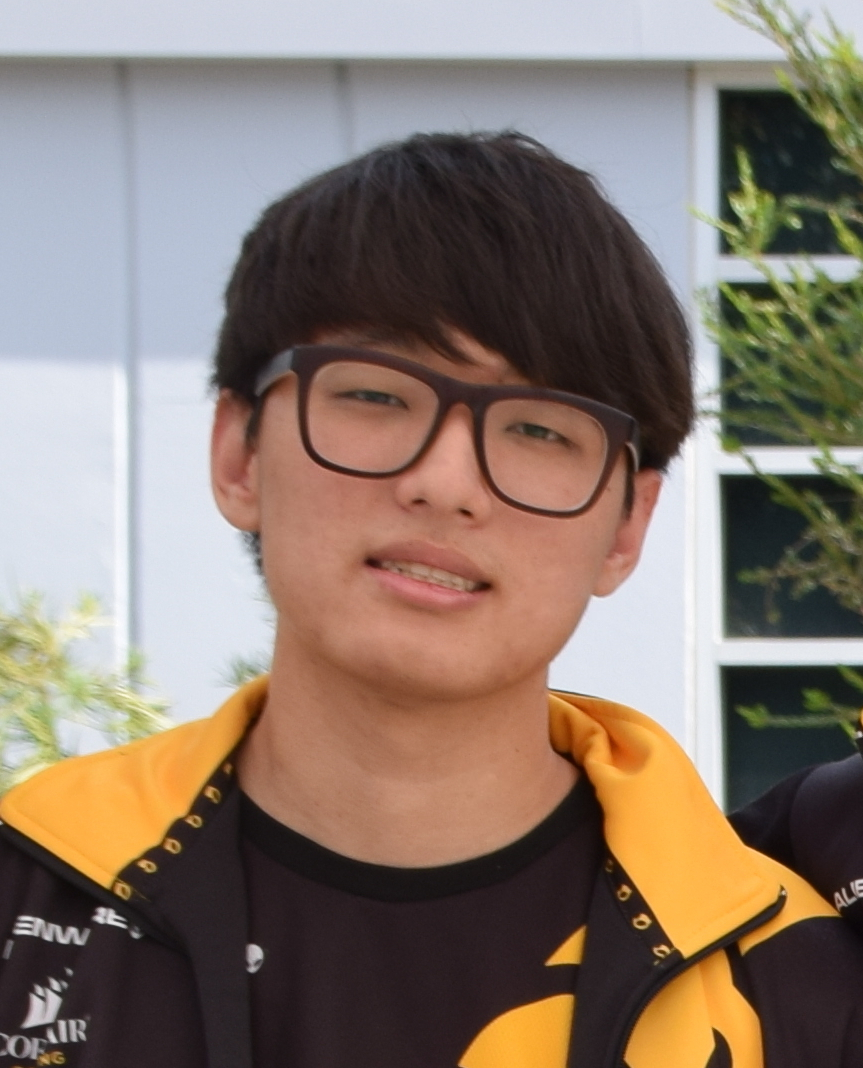
- Jo in 2015

Personal information
- Name: Jo Yong-in
- Born: 22 June 1994 (age 32)
- Nationality: South Korean

Current team
- Team: Team Liquid
- Role: Support
- Game: League of Legends
- League: LCS

Team history
- 2014–2015: Dignitas
- 2015–2017: Samsung Galaxy
- 2017–2018: Gen.G (Note: Known as KSV eSports from November 2017 to May 2018.)
- 2018–present: Team Liquid

Career highlights and awards
- World champion (2017); 3× LCS champion; 2× LCS MVP; 6× LCS All–Pro First Team; 2× LCS Lock in Champion; LTA champion; IEM champion (2016)
Medal record
Esports
Representing South Korea
Asian Games
| Silver medal – second place | 2018 Jakarta – Palembang | League of Legends |

Jo Yong-in (Korean: 조용인), better known as CoreJJ, is a South Korean League of Legends player who is the support for Team Liquid of the League of Legends Championship of The Americas (LTA). He won the 2017 World Championship with Samsung Galaxy. He was named MVP of the 2020 LCS Summer Split. He received his green card in February 2022.

He also represented the South Korean national team at the 2018 Asian Games, earning a silver medal.

== Tournament results ==
- 1st - IEM Season XI Gyeonggi (Samsung Galaxy)
- 2nd - 2016 League of Legends World Championship (Samsung Galaxy)
- 2nd - 2017 Rift Rivals (Samsung Galaxy)
- 1st - 2017 League of Legends World Championship (Samsung Galaxy)
- 2nd - 2018 Jakarta Palembang Asian Games (South Korea)
- 1st - 2019 LCS Spring (Team Liquid)
- 2nd - 2019 Mid-season invitational (Team Liquid)
- 2nd - 2019 Rift Rivals (Team Liquid)
- 1st - 2019 LCS Summer (Team Liquid)
- 1st - 2021 LCS Lock In (Team Liquid)
- 2nd - 2021 LCS Spring (Team Liquid)
- 2nd - 2021 LCS Summer (Team Liquid)
- 1st - 2022 LCS Lock In (Team Liquid)
- 1st - 2024 LCS Spring (Team Liquid)
