= Diamondprox =

Russian esports player

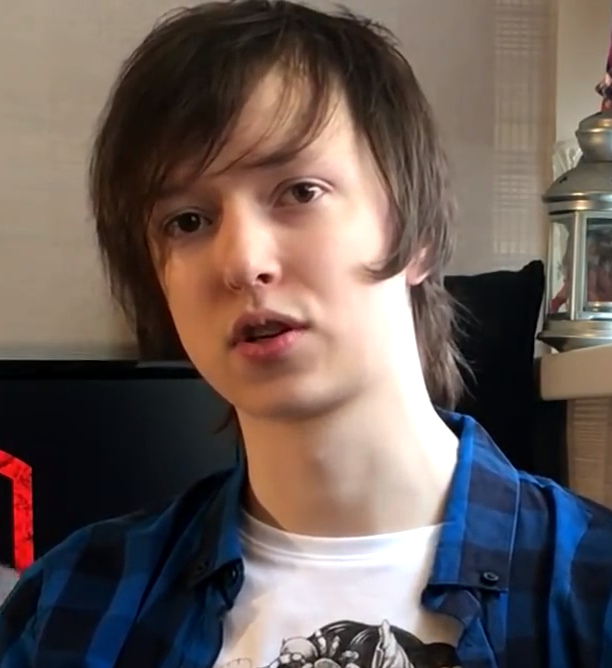
- Reshetnikov in 2016

Personal information
- Name: Данил Решетников (Danil Reshetnikov)
- Born: 24 December 1992 (age 33)
- Nationality: Russian

Career information
- Game: League of Legends
- Playing career: 2011–present
- Role: Jungler

Team history
- 2011: Team Empire
- 2011–2013: Moscow Five
- 2013–2015: Gambit Gaming
- 2015–2016: Unicorns of Love
- 2016: Gambit Esports
- 2016: Apex Gaming
- 2016–2020: Gambit Esports
- 2021: FURIA Esports
- 2022: Team Spirit

Career highlights and awards
- 3× LCL champion; IEM world champion

Danil Reshetnikov (Russian: Данил Решетников, born 24 December 1992), better known by his in-game name Diamondprox, is a Russian professional League of Legends player. He is best known for his time playing as the jungler for Gambit Esports (formerly Gambit Gaming). He previously played for Team Empire, Moscow Five, the Unicorns of Love, Team Spirit (esports) and Apex Gaming. Diamondprox hails from Saint Petersburg and is one of the world's most well-known junglers, known for his prowess on champions such as Lee Sin in Season 2, and innovating the popular Season 3 jungle play of Nasus and Xin Zhao. Diamondprox became known in the high elo ladders of League of Legends around the end of Season 1 and start of pre-Season 2.

== Career ==
=== Pre-Season 2 ===
In October 2011, he joined Team Empire as a jungler. The team subsequently won the IEM Season VI Qualifiers, securing a position at the IEM Season VI Global Challenge Kiev. A notable play against SK Gaming during this period led to the emergence of the recognized community catchphrase "EMPIRE!" and meme associated with the team's name.

=== Season 2 ===
Diamond with the rest of Team Empire were recruited by organization Moscow Five in December 2011. Their first major appearance would be at the IEM Season VI - Global Challenge Kiev on 19 January 2012. It would be here that Moscow 5 would make a name for themselves internationally, as they had little fame prior to IEM Kiev. At the event, Moscow 5 would show a dominant performance, going undefeated in group stage against Dignitas, against All authority, and Sypher. Taking first by going 3–0 in the group stage, Diamond and team would advance to the playoffs where they would take the series 2–0 against SK Gaming. Moving to the finals, Moscow 5 would defeat North American powerhouse Team SoloMid 2–1, dropping their only game of the tournament against Team SoloMid.

On 31 January 2012, Diamond with company would compete in the online Kings of Europe tournament. Once again showing their strength, they would go undefeated in the group stage, defeating SK Gaming, exGBT, and Team Mistral. Advancing to the playoffs, they would go on to defeat French team Sypher 2–1 in the semifinals. In doing so, Moscow 5 would face off against European favorite Counter Logic Gaming EU in the finals, where they would fall 1–2.

On 10 March 2012, Danil with his teammates would attend the IEM Season VI - World Championship in Hanover. Reproducing their results from Kiev, Moscow 5 once again went undefeated in group stage 5–0, defeating SK Gaming, Curse Gaming, Team SoloMid, Sypher, and EHome. Diamond would play a crucial role in the jungle to assist his team and continue their win streak in the playoff bracket, beating Counter Logic Gaming Prime 2–0 in the semifinals and defeating Dignitas 2–0 in the finals to take home first place. This tournament would mark a high point in Moscow 5's history, as they were able to come out of the tournament not only victorious, but were able to do so while not dropping a single game throughout the entire competition.

His team's next high placing at a major tournament would be at the online Corsair Vengeance Cup. Coming out of the group stage of the tournament 2–1, Moscow 5 had a strong run in the playoffs, defeating Hauteur 8, Intent Gaming, TeamRedbyteItalia, and Meet Your Makers in the first four rounds of the playoff bracket, before falling to against aAa 0–2 in the second phase of the winner's bracket, knocking the Russian team down to the loser's bracket. Moscow 5 would face off against Team SoloMid in their first match of the loser's bracket, in which the Russian team would come out victorious 2–1. Danil then faced and defeated SK Gaming 2–0 in the next round of the loser's bracket, which put them up to face against aAa once again. This time the team would come out victorious, defeating aAa 2–0, which put the team up against Counter Logic Gaming EU in the grand finals of the Corsair Vengeance Cup. Unfortunately, Moscow 5 would fall short to CLG.EU 0–2, losing to the team once again in a finals setting, taking home second place.

On 16 June, Diamondprox and comrades would attend DreamHack Summer 2012 after taking second at the online qualifiers. Moscow 5 would take second in group stage going 2–1, defeating Absolute Legends and Mebdi's Minions, but losing to Counter Logic Gaming EU. Advancing to the semifinals, Moscow 5 would face off against Curse Gaming EU, where the Russian team was able to come out ahead 2–0, advancing them to the grand finals of DreamHack Summer 2012. At the finals, Moscow 5 would play against familiar opponent, Counter Logic Gaming EU, where they would fall 0–2.

Diamond and Moscow 5 attended European Challenger Circuit: Poland after qualifying online with a 2–0 victory over CLG.EU sending them to the loser's bracket. This would mean that the teams shall meet again in the group stage, where Moscow 5 took second place going 2–1, defeating EloHell.net and Ocelote World while losing a game to CLG.EU. In the semifinals, Moscow 5 had a strong showing defeating Curse EU 2–0, going with a perfect 15–0 score in the second game. At the finals, Moscow 5 would meet their rivals CLG.EU once again. After having a 0–4 record against them in lan events, Diamondprox with his team were able to claim their revenge with a commanding 2–0 victory making them the ECC Poland champions.

As one of the eight European invitees for the Season Two Regional Finals - Cologne, Moscow Five would fly out to Germany for a chance to qualify for the Season 2 World Championship. Matched up against the recently formed Polish team EloHell, Moscow Five would take a 2–0 victory to advance to the second round of the playoffs. There, Moscow Five was able to come out victorious against Fnatic in a close 2–1, qualifying for the Season 2 World Championship in Los Angeles and advancing to the grand finals of the tournament. Continuing their dominant performance, Diamond would help win the finals 2–0 against SK Gaming.

At the Season 2 World Championship in October, Diamondprox with his teammates were considered by many analysts and professionals to be the favorites coming into the event. They were given a bye through the group stage and were selected to face Invictus Gaming in their quarterfinal match. Although iG consistently pressured M5's early game and won the laning phase, the Russian squad was able to overcome their deficits in the midgame and take the series 2–0. Advancing to face the Taipei Assassins in the semifinals, M5 continued their dominant form in the first game of the match and quickly secured game one. However, TPA matched M5's aggression in the next two games and successfully turned the series around. The Taiwanese team took the set 2–1, and Moscow Five was forced to settle for 3rd-4th place and $150,000.

=== Pre-Season 3 ===
After the Season 2 Championships, Danil's team would attend the European tournament Tales of the Lane from 27 October through 11 November 2012. They would emerge as first in their group stage 3–1, with wins against Curse EU, Eclypsia and MYM, but losing to the hungry IWantCookie. They were granted seeding directly into the semifinals due to their placing in the group stages. On 11 November M5 would travel to Paris to compete in the offline portions of the tournament. There they would face an upset from Curse EU, knocking them into the 3rd place match losing 0–2. They would finish the tournament with a sweep of SK Gaming, taking 3rd and €5,000 in winnings.

On 22 November 2012, Moscow 5 had the great opportunity to fly to Shanghai to attend the TGA Winter 2012 event. While not contestants of the tournament itself, the team would look to boost their popularity with the Chinese tour, doing photo ops, fan signings and Mandarin greeting videos. M5 also played two show matches against WE and iG, winning against both. They would leave China on 27 November, flying directly to Las Vegas to attend IPL 5.

On Day 1 of the IPL event, Diamond and M5 would advance through the group stages by defeating Curse Gaming twice and dropping a game to world champions, Taipei Assassins. They would then face World Elite which they scrimmed against heavily in Shanghai. However, WE would rout the Russian team 2–0, dropping them to the losers bracket. M5 would then defeat the tournament favorites, Korean powerhouse Azubu Blaze in a close 3-game series. M5 would get a chance to revenge their loss in the Season 2 World Championship against in TPA in round 5. Despite Alex Ich amassing an amazing 538 creep score and leading in gold to the very end of the game, M5 would still fall to the Taiwanese team in game 1, and lose again to Stanley on Nidalee in game 2, making it five consecutive loses to TPA. M5 would finish the tournament at 4th place and earn $3,000 in winnings.

On 10 January 2013, resultant of the arrest of Moscow Five's CEO in July of the previous year leaving the organization with a lack of funding, the League of Legends roster was released from the eSports organization as it went defunct.

=== Formation of Gambit Gaming ===
Four days later, on 14 January, it was announced that Gambit Gaming had acquired Diamondprox and the rest of the former M5 roster.

Marking their first appearance in an offline event as Gambit Gaming, in late January 2013, the Russian team would compete in IEM Season VII - Global Challenge Katowice as one of the eight qualified teams. Gambit Gaming would go 1–2 in the group stage, winning against MYM, while losing to Curse Gaming EU as well as Azubu Blaze. Because of this, the round robin had a tie of MYM, Gambit, and Curse Gaming EU, who all went 1–2. A time coefficient was used to break the tie though, giving Gambit Gaming a spot in the semifinals. Diamond would help to defeat Azubu Frost as the underdogs 2–0, then go on to take first place by knocking out Frost's brother team, Azubu Blaze who they had lost to in the group stage. Gambit Gaming takes home US$15,000 (≈11,609 Euros) as well as a direct seed into IEM World Championship.

=== Season 3 ===
==== Spring EU LCS ====
Competing as Gambit Gaming after qualifying as Moscow Five, the roster participated in the inaugural Season 3 European League of Legends Championship Series (LCS). The team finished the 10-week Spring Split in second place with a 21–7 record, securing their position for the following Summer Split. In the subsequent Spring Playoffs, the team placed second after a 2–3 defeat against Fnatic.

==== IEM World Championship & MLG Winter Championship ====
Gambit with Diamondprox attended the IEM Season VII - World Championship in Hannover, Germany held in March. The team dominated their group, going an undefeated 5–0, placing them in the semifinals. They then faced CJ Entus Frost and lost the set 2–1, knocking Gambit out of the tournament and ending the team in 3rd.

The Russian players were then invited to play in an international exhibition at 2013 MLG Winter Championship, playing first against American Team Dignitas, and won 2–0, constantly pressuring the opponent. Gambit faced Korean top contender KT Rolster B in the exhibition finals but were unable to secure 1st place, losing 2–1.

==== LCS All Stars ====
In April, Diamondprox with teammates "Alex Ich","Genja" and "Edward" were publicly voted to represent their respective lane positions on the Europe LCS All Star team to compete at All-Star Shanghai 2013 to play against the world's best All Star teams chosen in the same fashion. However, a rule stating that only 3 members of a team may be inducted onto the team, Genja was replaced as AD Carry by Evil Geniuses' Yellowpete. The team's top lane was sOAZ from Fnatic. Diamond with the rest of the EU all stars first faced off against heavy favorites Korean OGN Champions, and although good early gameplay from Diamond, the Korean team overtook them in a 2-0 set. Their next opponent was their sibling rivalry team, the North America LCS. Both teams played an explosive two games of up and down fighting however, NA LCS ended up being the victor, knocking Diamond with his all stars out of the tournament. In the All Star Skills Competition, Diamond bested China's Troll to reach the finals to play against Korea's inSec. In a move that thrilled the crowd, two of the world's most popular junglers, agreed to play their 1 v 1 in a mirror match of Lee Sin who they were both known for. inSec bested Diamondprox in the match up to win the skills tournament for junglers.

==== Summer EU LCS ====
Diamondprox qualified to the Season 3 World Championship with his team Gambit Gaming, finishing 3rd in the Summer Playoffs. 2016 Season

On 10 December, it was announced that Gambit has sold its LCS spot to Vitality, thus releasing the remaining players including Diamondprox. On 6 December, it was announced that he has joined Unicorns of Love and is the starting jungler for the team. They ended Week 2 of the 2016 EU LCS Spring Split with a 3-1 standing, only dropping a game to h2k-Gaming and even beating Fnatic. However, on 25 January, it was announced that Diamondprox will not be able to play for UOL anymore, for an undetermined amount of time, as he is having visa issues.

=== 2016 ===
On 10 December, it was announced that Gambit had sold its LCS spot to Team Vitality, in the process releasing their remaining players including Diamondprox. On 13 December 2015, it was announced that he has joined Unicorns of Love and would be the starting jungler for the team. They ended Week 2 of the 2016 EU LCS Spring Split with a 3-1 standing, only dropping a game to h2k-Gaming and even beating Fnatic. However, on 25 January, it was announced that Diamondprox would not be able to play for an undetermined amount of time, as he is having visa issues.

Before the 2016 Summer split, he was acquired by Team Apex of the North American League of Legends Championship Series. Playing as substitute for the main roster then relegated to the academy team (challenger league) with mediocre results, Daniil quit the organisation in the end of the summer split.

On 18 October Daniil rejoined his old organisation, in rebuilding mode, and was appointed as captain and main recruiter for the upcoming roster.

=== 2017 ===
Spring split of LCL was disappointing with the team failing to reach playoffs and finishing in 6th place out of 8 teams with 6 wins and 8 losses. Before summer split, roster changes were made, the acquisition of well renowned top regional players helped Diamondprox conquer the LCL title and a sport in play in stage at the 2017 World Championship. In the play in Stage the team went 0-4 and lost all games which made the organization make a change in the Coach position.

=== 2018 ===
Following a coaching change and the retention of its existing roster, Gambit.CIS won the 2018 LCL Spring Split. This victory qualified the team for the Play-In stage of the Mid-Season Invitational in Berlin, the second-highest ranked international tournament in League of Legends esports. During the group stage, Gambit secured first place in their group, finishing with a record that included a single defeat.

== Tournament results ==
=== Moscow Five ===
- 1st — IEM VII Katowice
- 1st — ESL Major Series Winter 2012
- 3rd — Season 2 World Championship
- 3rd–4th — IEM VII World Championship

=== Gambit Gaming ===
- 2nd — Season 3 EU LCS Spring Playoffs
- 3rd — Season 3 EU LCS Summer Playoffs
- 1st — IEM VIII Cologne

=== Unicorns of Love ===
- 5th — 2016 EU LCS Spring regular season

=== Team Apex ===
- 6th — 2016 NA LCS Summer regular season
- 5th–6th — 2016 NA LCS Summer playoffs

=== Gambit.CIS ===
- 1st — 2017 LCL Summer
- 1st — 2018 LCL Spring
