= Alex Ich =

Russian League of Legends player

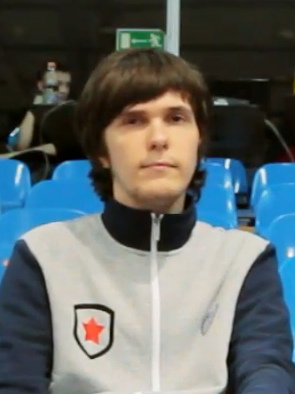
- Ichetovkin in 2014

Personal information
- Name: Алексей Ичетовкин (Aleksei Ichetovkin)
- Born: Russia
- Nationality: Russian

Career information
- Games: League of Legends
- Playing career: 2010–2018
- Role: Mid laner

Team history
- 2010: Dimegio Club
- 2011: Liquicity
- 2011: myRevenge
- 2011: MTG
- 2011: Team Empire
- 2011–2013: Moscow Five
- 2013–2014: Gambit Gaming
- 2014: Ninjas in Pyjamas
- 2014: RoX
- 2014: Oritura Sum
- 2014–2015: RoX
- 2015: Team Dragon Knights
- 2015: Misfits
- 2015–2016: Renegades
- 2016: Team Dragon Knights
- 2016–2017: Team Envy

Aleksei Ichetovkin, better known as Alex Ich, is a Russian retired professional League of Legends player. He was previously a streamer for the Pittsburgh Knights. During his professional career, Alex Ich played as the mid laner for several teams, including Moscow Five, Gambit Gaming, Renegades, Team Dragon Knights, Team Envy, and Ninjas in Pyjamas. During the peak of his career, around 2012, he was considered one of the best players in the world.

He joined Team Dragon Knights in a trade with Renegades on March 3, 2016. Ichetovkin retired in November 2018.

He currently works for Riot Games as a software engineer.

== Tournament results ==
=== Moscow Five ===
- 1st — Intel Extreme Masters Season VII – Global Challenge Gamescom
- 3rd–4th — Season 2 World Championship

=== Gambit Gaming ===
- 1st — IEM Season VII – Global Challenge Katowice
- 1st — ESL Major Series Winter 2012
- 3rd–4th — IEM Season VII – World Championship
- 2nd — 2013 MLG Winter Championship International Exhibition
- 2nd — Season 3 EU LCS Spring Playoffs
- 3rd — Season 3 EU LCS Summer Playoffs
- 5th–8th – Season 3 World Championship
- 1st — IEM Season VIII – Cologne

=== Team Dragon Knights ===
- Qualified — LCS Promotion

=== Team Envy ===
- 7th — 2016 NA LCS Summer regular season
