= Counter Logic Gaming =

American esports organization

- Short name: CLG
- Divisions: League of Legends; Fortnite; Super Smash Bros.; Apex Legends; Valorant
- Founded: April 2010
- Folded: April 2023
- Location: Los Angeles, California
- President: George Georgallidis
- Partners: Bud Light; MTN Dew Amp Game Fuel; OMEN by HP; Twitch; Squarespace; Spectrum; FLEXFIT; Logitech; Samsung SSD; Govee
- Parent group: Madison Square Garden Sports

Counter Logic Gaming (CLG) was an American esports organization headquartered in Los Angeles, California. It was founded in April 2010 by George "HotshotGG" Georgallidis and Alexander "Vodoo" Beutel as a League of Legends team and branched out into other games.

CLG fielded the oldest League of Legends team active at the time, having competed in every split of the North American League of Legends Championship Series (NA LCS) since it began in Spring 2013. CLG won two NA LCS splits, the 2015 Summer NA LCS and 2016 Spring NA LCS. The team also attended the 2012, 2015 and 2016 League of Legends World Championships, and was eliminated in the group stage on each occasion.

The organization also fielded Smite, Counter-Strike: Global Offensive (CS:GO), Super Smash Bros., Fortnite, H1Z1, Valorant, Dota 2, Overwatch, Hearthstone, Rocket League, Halo, Tom Clancy's Rainbow Six Siege, and Call of Duty teams. The organization was also one of the first in North America to implement a multi-team gaming house, and the current residence is able to house all their major divisions and the management staff on a permanent basis.

On July 31, 2017, Madison Square Garden Sports acquired a controlling stake in CLG.

On April 6, 2023, NRG Esports acquired CLG. The terms of the sale included only CLG's flagship League of Legends team, with all other players and staff being laid off. The CLG brand was officially shuttered post-acquisition. Consequently, Madison Square Garden Sports now owns a major stake in NRG.

== History ==
=== Organization ===
Counter Logic Gaming was founded to compete in League of Legends tournaments by George "HotshotGG" Georgallidis and Alexander "Vodoo" Beutel in April 2010. In December 2011, Counter Logic Gaming merged with the Absolute Legends organization. Although the two organizations decided to separate a month later, the ex-AbsoluteLegends roster chose to stay with CLG, as Counter Logic Gaming Europe. On February 2, 2012, the organization announced that it had acquired the Dota 2 roster of Swedish team eXperience Gaming. In May of that year, Georgallidis created a CLG League of Legends B team, known as Counter Logic Gaming Black. On July 2, 2012, HotshotGG stepped down from the position of active CEO of Counter Logic Gaming, citing a wish to focus more on his game-play, and was replaced by his mother, Helen Georgallidis.

In October 2012, CLG's Dota 2 team officially disbanded, with most of the players having left weeks before. Less than three months later, in late December, CLG.EU elected not to re-sign their contracts, instead signing with Evil Geniuses. The organization also disbanded CLG Black, leaving the original League of Legends team as the only roster under the Counter Logic Gaming banner. CEO Helen Georgallidis and COO Robert "CyberBob" Del Papa resigned with these announcements, and Kelby May was promoted to general manager for the organization. Kelby remained at CLG for two years until September 2014, when he stepped down; Matthew "MaTTcom" Marikian was promoted to general manager, while Bryan "bchenN" Chen was hired as the director of finance and operations.

On November 10, 2014, Counter Logic Gaming announced that they had acquired the Shoot to Kill (now Final Boss) Halo roster, including professional Halo veteran Tom "OGRE 2" Ryan, branded under the name Counter Logic Gaming Halo. In January 2015, the organization also acquired the ex-mouseSpaz Counter-Strike: Global Offensive roster as CLG.CS, and reestablished the CLG Black brand that same month. On June 14, 2015, the organization expanded into Super Smash Bros. Melee, picking up Kevin "PewPewU" Toy. On July 7, 2015, the all-female ex-Ubinite roster was announced as CLG Red, a second Counter-Strike: Global Offensive team, and on August 6, 2015, the organization announced that Devin "Mylixia" Nash had become the new CEO, while HotshotGG became the President/Owner of Counter Logic Gaming.

On December 2, 2015, the organization announced that they had expanded into Call of Duty by acquiring the roster of Denial eSports.

On July 31, 2017, Madison Square Garden Sports, owners of the NBA team New York Knicks and the NHL team New York Rangers acquired a controlling stake in CLG.

On April 3, 2023, independent League of Legends reporter Travis Gafford reported that CLG would be closing its esports operations, laying off its staff, and laying off all of its teams, including the sale of its LCS slot. On April 6, 2023, NRG Esports acquired CLG, with MSG becoming a major shareholder in NRG.

=== Controversies ===
==== Major League Gaming ====
On November 8, 2011, Counter Logic Gaming was disqualified from the MLG Providence 2011 Qualifiers. Having won their qualification match against RFLXGaming, it transpired that the team had fielded Luis "Lapaka" Perez in place of Ho-jin "Lilac" Jeon. Lapaka was registered as the team leader for AbsoluteLegends, another team in the tournament, and had played in a match between AbsoluteLegends and Team SoloMid. MLG ruled that CLG's decision to illegally use Lapaka as a ringer for their match against RFLXGaming warranted disqualification and confiscation of all prize money.

==== LCS fines and punishments ====
On August 12, 2014, Riot Games' Nick Allen announced that four members of Counter Logic Gaming's League of Legends team were to be fined US$1,250 for violating the League of Legends Championship Series rule associated with account sharing during their stay in Korea. These same players were also banned from Ongamenet (OGN) and Korean e-Sports Association-owned tournaments for two years. On December 10, 2014, CLG was fined US$10,000 by Riot, after being found guilty of soliciting Team Dignitas' William "Scarra" Li without acquiring his current team's approval. Additionally, Scarra was prohibited from serving as CLG's head coach on stage for the first three weeks of the 2015 NA LCS Spring Split. On January 6, 2015, after this first ruling, CLG's management voluntarily revealed a similar violation regarding the recruitment of Darshan "ZionSpartan" Upadhyaya. CLG was fined $2,000 by Riot, while Yiliang "Doublelift" Peng was fined US$2,500 for encouraging the violation. Furthermore, the team was restricted from fielding ZionSpartan for the first week of the 2015 LCS.

== Former divisions ==
=== League of Legends ===
==== Original team ====
Counter Logic Gaming began as a group of ten League of Legends players in April 2010, originally including Andy "Reginald" Dinh, among others, but solidified as a formal five-man roster, made up of "HotshotGG", Michael "bigfatjiji" Tang, Steve "Chauster" Chau, Sam "Kobe24" Hartman-Kenzler, and Cody "Elementz" Sigfusson. The team's first offline accomplishment was a win at World Cyber Games 2010, taking the final series against European powerhouse SK Gaming. Shortly afterwards in April 2011, Kobe24 retired from professional gaming, and Brandon "Saintvicious" DiMarco took his place on the team. Shortly afterwards, bigfatjiji was forced to change his name to bigfatlp by Riot Games. In June 2011, CLG attended the Riot Games Season 1 World Championship in Sweden. Despite a loss to Team SoloMid, they advanced from the group stage, but were knocked out of championship contention by FnaticMSI, and forced to fight for an eventual fifth-place finish.

In August 2011, after a string of domestic victories, CLG participated in their second international LAN tournament, IEM Season VI Cologne. The team defeated Team SoloMid in the Grand Final, and claimed victory. In November 2011, after a disappointing domestic run, including disqualification from MLG Providence 2011, CLG benched Elementz, adding Yiliang "Doublelift" Peng to their active roster. However, in order to participate in the nation-locked 2011 World Cyber Games, CLG formed a temporary all-Canadian team. Elementz returned to the roster for the event, and Team Solomid players Shan "Chaox" Huang and Brian "TheOddOne" Wyllie made up the rest of this temporary roster, alongside CLG members bigfatlp and HotshotGG. CLG was beaten by the Polish team in the semifinals, but was able to triumph over French team Millenium in the third place match.

After a fairly successful domestic run, including victory in Season 2 of the National ESL Premier League, CLG participated in the IEM Season VI World Championship in March 2012. Placing second in the group stage and losing to Russian team Moscow Five in the semifinals, CLG narrowly defeated aAa in the third place match. On March 12, 2012, CLG moved into a temporary gaming house in South Korea to participate in the 2012 OGN Spring Championship. Having qualified for the playoffs, CLG fell in the first round to eventual champions MiG Blaze, and on April 25, 2012, the team moved back to North America. Citing internal tensions between players Saintvicious, HotshotGG, and Chauster, CLG made a roster change in May 2012, removing Saintvicious, and adding Joedat "Voyboy" Esfahani from Team Dignitas. Two days later, the team announced a name change from Counter Logic Gaming to Counter Logic Gaming Prime, to differentiate themselves from the organization's second North American League of Legends team, Counter Logic Gaming Black. In June 2012, the newly named CLG Prime attended MLG Anaheim 2012, falling to rivals Team SoloMid in the finals.

CLG Prime was one of two North American teams to be invited to compete in the 2012 OGN Summer Championship. The team lost in their first group stage game to Counter Logic Gaming Europe. Despite this early loss, they qualified for the playoffs, and were eliminated by Korean team Azubu Frost. Despite no longer competing in Korea, CLG Prime remained the country to practice for the upcoming North American Regional Finals. There, after falling to Team SoloMid and defeating Team Curse in the third place match, CLG Prime became the last North American team to qualify for the Riot Games Season 2 World Championship.

At October's Riot Games Season 2 World Championship, CLG Prime was knocked out in the group stage, taking home a ninth/tenth-place finish and US$50,000. Following their disappointing World Championship performance, Voyboy left the team, and former MiG Frost player Yoon-sub "Locodoco" Choi was picked up. On November 29, CLG Prime entered IPL 5. Despite surprisingly strong showings against Curse EU, FnaticRC, and Moscow Five, the team placed fifth/sixth. After the event, Locodoco expressed in an interview that "coming to America was a mistake", but added that it did not indicate he would be leaving the team. However, on December 4 CLG announced the departure of Locodoco, and on December 28, Zaqueri "Aphromoo" Black was announced as their starting support player, while Austin "LiNk" Shin, formerly of CLG Black, joined as a substitute player. The team also dropped the Prime suffix from their name, due to the departure of Counter Logic Gaming Europe and disbanding of Counter Logic Gaming Black. On January 15, 2013, bigfatlp announced that he would be stepping down from the starting roster to a substitute position, citing lack of confidence in his own play, while LiNk stepped up to the starting roster.

As one of the top three teams from the North American region, CLG auto-qualified for the newly created Riot Games NA League of Legends Championship Series (NA LCS), the Spring Split of which began February 27, 2013. Following a regular season placement of fourth with a record of 13–15, the team was knocked into the Summer Promotion Tournament following defeat in the playoffs. CLG won their promotion match against bigfatlp's challenger team, Azure Cats, and was allowed to remain in the 2013 NA LCS for the Summer Split. Following this unsatisfactory split, HotshotGG decided to step down, and Aphromoo left. Bigfatlp rejoined the active roster, and Zachary "Nientonsoh" Malhas was acquired to fill the other vacant position. CLG also announced, on July 24, 2013, that OGN caster Christopher "MonteCristo" Mykles would be joining CLG as a coach.

The Summer Split proved no better for the revamped CLG roster, who ended the regular season in sixth place with a record of 13–15, scraping into playoffs. A loss in their first series against long-time rivals Team SoloMid meant they could no longer qualify for the Season 3 World Championship. The team claimed fifth/sixth place in the playoffs by beating Team Curse, and secured requalification for the next season of the NA LCS. On October 23, Chauster announced his retirement from competitive play, while bigfatlp moved back to a sub position. On November 7 it was announced that Aphromoo and Brian "TrickZ" Ahn would temporarily fill CLG's vacancies for the upcoming Intel Extreme Masters Season VIII Cologne. CLG took fourth at the event, falling in the semifinals to Fnatic. The organization announced that TrickZ would not remain with the team coming into 2014. Before the start of the 2014 Spring Split, CLG solidified their roster by picking up Marcel "dexter" Feldkamp, formerly of European team Lemondogs, and also offered a permanent roster spot to Aphromoo.

In the 2014 NA LCS Spring Split, CLG ended the regular season with the record of 18–10, placing third below rivals Cloud9 and Team SoloMid. CLG finished third at playoffs after losing to Team SoloMid and defeating Team Curse. Following this performance, Nientonsoh decided to step down from the starting line up, stating that he was unable to handle the heavy criticism from the public. On May 19, 2014, after considerable speculation, Korean import Wu-Yeong "Seraph" Shin was officially announced as the team's fifth member.

With its third-place finish in the Spring, CLG was able to compete in the 2014 NA LCS Summer Split. For five weeks in the mid-season, CLG held first place and peaked at a 13–7 record. However, toward the end of the split their form began to decline, and days before Week 11 of the split began, coach MonteCristo announced that the team would spend a number of weeks "bootcamping" in Korea to prepare for playoffs and a prospective World Championship spot. In the 2014 NA LCS Summer Playoffs, CLG entered with considerable expectations after their stint in South Korea. The team was heavily favored to take their initial series from Team Curse, but was cleanly beaten, and eliminated from contention for a Riot Games Season 4 World Championship seed. Following a second loss to Team Dignitas, CLG dropped into the following split's promotion tournament, where they defeated Curse Academy in an extremely close series. Shortly afterwards, on October 13, 2014, dexter announced that he would not renew his contract for the following split.

On October 31, 2014, the organization announced that William "Scarra" Li would be joining as the team's head coach, while also announcing that tryouts had begun for all positions. Eight days later, Darshan "ZionSpartan" Upadhyaya was announced as the newest addition to the lineup, replacing Seraph, whose contract the organization had decided not to renew. A month later, in December, it was announced that LiNk would return to the starting lineup for the forthcoming split, alongside Jake "Xmithie" Puchero, formerly of Team Vulcun. On December 19 CLG attended IEM IX Cologne with their new roster, aside from Xmithie, who was unable to attend due to visa issues; the team played with a substitute and finished second, behind Gambit Gaming.

The new roster made a remarkably strong start to the 2015 Spring NA LCS Split, and just missed out on a playoff bye after losing a second-place regular season tiebreaker to Cloud9. Despite looking strong going into the 2015 Spring Playoffs, CLG was once again unable to perform, losing in the quarterfinals to Team Liquid, and ended up in fifth place. Shortly after the playoffs ended, Scarra resigned as head coach on April 17, 2015. Less than a month later, LiNk also left, releasing a public statement about his time with CLG, in which he criticized almost every player, as well as the management and the coaching staff. The next day, the organization announced that they had replaced LiNk with two players, Eugene "Pobelter" Park and Jae-hyun "HuHi" Choi, with the plan being to alternate between the two. On May 28, 2015, Chris "Blurred Limes" Ehrenreich was announced as the new head coach of the team, while existing analyst Tony "Zikz" Gray was moved to a new position, Strategic Coach.

CLG had their best regular NA LCS split yet in the summer of 2015, finishing in second place with a record of 13–5. Their record gave the team an automatic playoff bye into the semifinals, where they were able to sweep Team Impulse, matching CLG against rivals Team SoloMid in their first NA LCS final. In the final, Counter Logic Gaming swept their long-term rivals, and became NA LCS champions for the first time, while Doublelift won the first LAN event of his five-year career. The team also secured the first North American seed to the 2015 League of Legends World Championship.

Although they were drawn into what was considered to be the easiest group, CLG finished below Flash Wolves and KOO Tigers, and so failed to progress to the tournament's knockout stage. Despite having their most successful NA LCS season, the organization made large changes to the championship winning roster. On October 23, 2015, it was announced that HuHi would be stepping up to the active roster, having fulfilled the role of a sub for the entirely of the previous split, while Pobelter left the team shortly afterwards. On October 28, it was announced that Blurred Limes had been released from the organization, with "a breach of trust" cited as the main reason behind the decision. On October 31, it was announced that Doublelift had been released after four years of being involved with the organization. Attitude problems and conflict within the team were cited as the main motivators. Doublelift was announced as the newest member of Team SoloMid shortly afterwards.

On November 11, 2015, former analyst and strategic coach Zikz was announced as CLG's new head coach, and on November 20, 2015, the organization announced that Trevor "Stixxay" Hayes, formerly of CLG Black, would be the fifth player for the team at IEM San Jose, although he was not announced as the starter for 2016. At the tournament, CLG would beat out both Unicorns of Love and Jin Air Green Wings 2-0, before falling to Origen in the final, marking the first time a North American team had beaten a Korean team in a series.

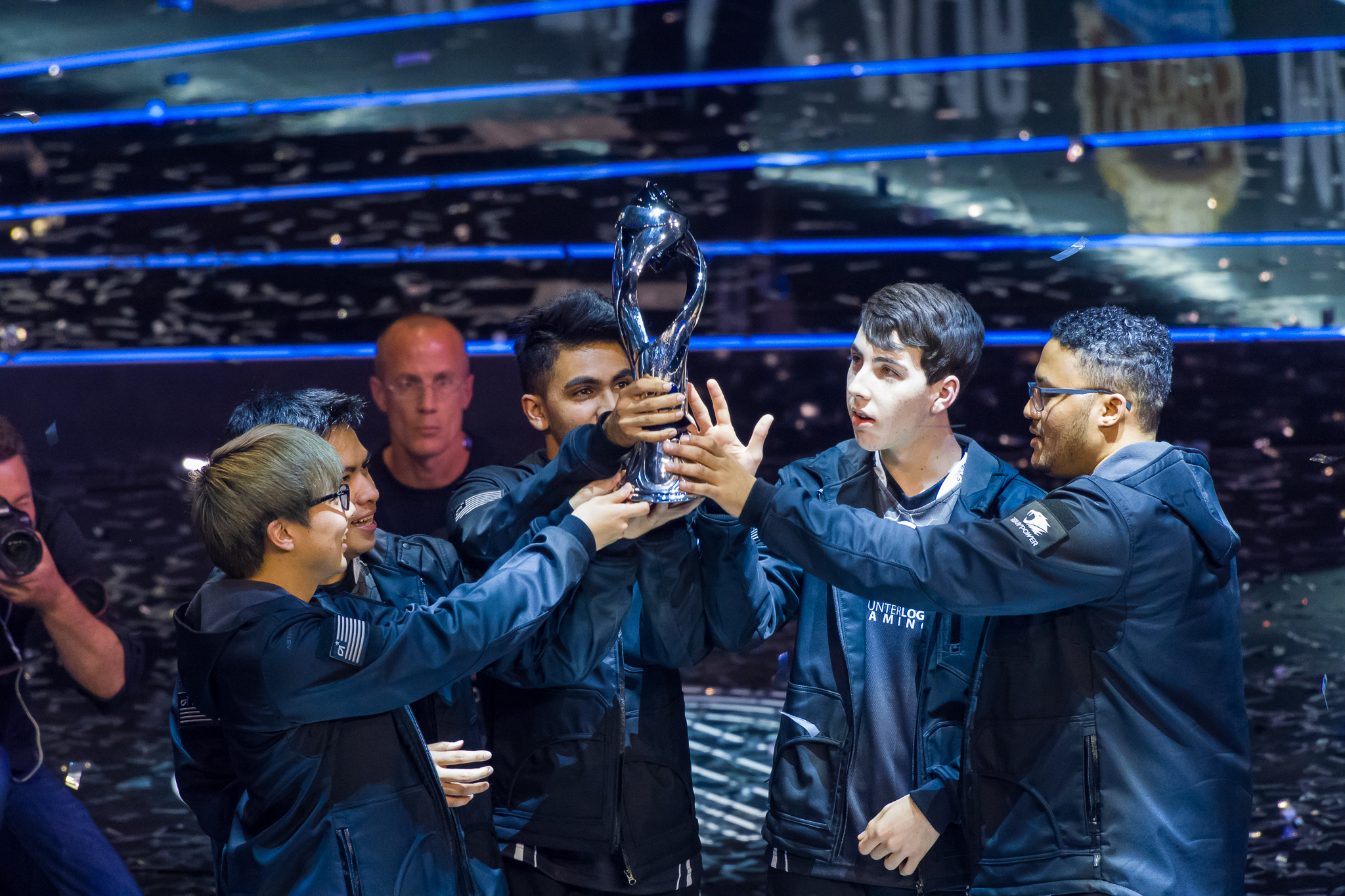
CLG won the 2016 NA LCS Spring Finals.

On April 17, 2016, CLG won their second consecutive NA LCS championship, defeating longtime rivals Team Solomid 3–2 in the grand finals.

With the 2016 NA LCS Summer Playoffs coming to a close, Team SoloMid swept CLG in the semifinals 3–0. This however sent CLG to play Immortals at the Air Canada Centre (Toronto, Canada) in the coveted 3rd place match, with crucial circuit points at stake. On August 27, 2016, CLG fell to IMT in 5 games to place 4th overall during the 2016 Summer Playoffs. With a TSM Victory over Cloud9 on August 28, 2016, CLG auto-qualified (off circuit points) as North America's 2nd seed at the 2016 League of Legends World Championships.

==== CLG.EU ====
On December 20, 2011, Counter Logic Gaming and European organization Absolute Legends announced a merger. The roster of Mike "Wickd" Petersen, Stephen "Snoopeh" Ellis, Henrik "Froggen" Hansen, Peter "Yellowpete" Wüppen, and Mitch "Krepo" Voorspoels became Counter Logic Gaming Europe. A month later, on January 30, 2012, the two organizations decided to separate, but the European roster elected to stay under the Counter Logic Gaming brand. The team's first challenge would be in the Kings of Europe online tournament, placing first after defeating Russian juggernauts Moscow Five in the final. The team experienced immense regional success over the next few months, consistently beating top European teams FnaticRC, Moscow Five, against All authority, and SK Gaming, and winning several tournaments, including the Corsair Vengeance Cup, In2LOL Kickoff EU, and Absolute Pro League March.

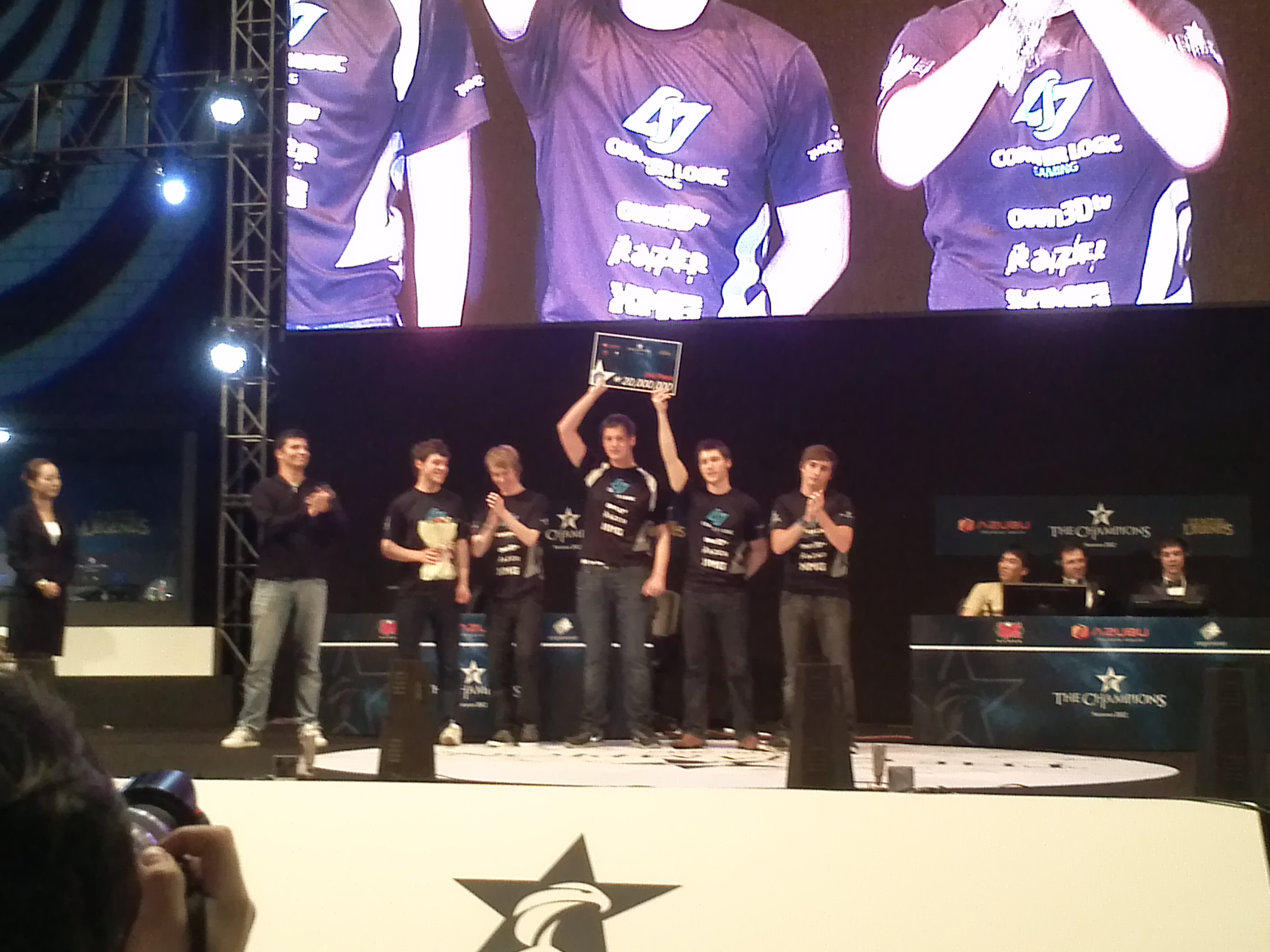
Counter Logic Gaming Europe at the Finals of the 2012 OGN Summer Championship. From left: Peter "Yellowpete" Wüppen, Henrik "Froggen" Hansen, Mike "Wickd" Petersen, Stephen "Snoopeh" Ellis and Mitch "Krepo" Voorspoels.

On June 10, 2012, Counter Logic Gaming Europe flew to Anaheim, California to participate in the 2012 MLG Spring Championships. Beaten out of the Winners Bracket by Team SoloMid, CLG.EU defeated both Team Curse EU and Orbit Gaming to advance to round six of the Losers Bracket, where they fell to Counter Logic Gaming Prime, going home with a fifth/sixth-place finish. After only six days of rest, the team flew out to Jönköping, Sweden to participate in DreamHack Summer 2012. In the group stage, CLG.EU placed first, defeating Moscow Five, Absolute Legends, and Mebdi's Minions, and then defeated FnaticRC to advance to the Grand Final. There, CLG.EU defeated Moscow Five once again in dominating fashion, securing their first major offline title.

After a successful year in the European Challenger Circuit, accruing a large number of circuit points, Counter Logic Gaming Europe was one of eight European teams to qualify for the Riot Season 2 European Regionals in August 2012, and flew out to Germany to compete for a spot at the Riot Games Season 2 World Championship. Despite being the heavy favorite coming into the event, CLG.EU fell to SK Gaming, dropping down in the bracket to play for the final worlds seed against Fnatic. The team took a clean victory, and secured themselves a spot in the Season 2 World Championship. Later that month Counter Logic Gaming EU was one of two European teams invited to attend the 2012 OGN Summer Championship. The team went undefeated in group play, going 3–0 against CLG Prime, LG-IM, and MVP Blue. CLG.EU defeated World Elite in the quarterfinals and NaJin Sword in the semifinals. Matched up against Azubu Frost in the final series of the tournament, CLG.EU almost took victory before losing three games in a row, and was only able to take home second place.

Counter Logic Gaming EU traveled to Los Angeles in October 2012 to compete in the Riot Games Season 2 World Championship. In the group stage, CLG.EU looked dominant while taking games off of Team Dignitas and Saigon Jokers. Advancing out of Group B as the second seed, the team faced World Elite in the round of eight. This match was marred by technical issues and had to be postponed due to power failures and connection problems. In the deciding third game, CLG.EU were finally able to secure victory. The team maintained their form through the first game of their semifinal against Azubu Frost, but were outmatched in games two and three, losing out overall. They finished in third/fourth place and were awarded prize money of $150,000.

On November 29, 2012, Counter Logic Gaming EU attended IPL 5 in Las Vegas, and began the tournament with a winning streak against North American teams CLG Prime, Team FeaR, and Team SoloMid. The eventual winners of the tournament, World Elite, pushed CLG.EU into the Losers Bracket, where they faced Season 2 World Champions, Taipei Assassins, who beat the Europeans and eliminated them from the tournament, leaving them with a disappointing final placement of fifth/sixth. In December 2012, just before the new year, CLG.EU decided not to renew their contract, and parted ways with the Counter Logic Gaming organization. On January 25, 2013, the team announced that they had joined Evil Geniuses.

==== CLG Black ====
On April 30, 2012, Counter Logic Gaming announced that it was looking for players to form a League of Legends B team. The roster for this team, Counter Logic Gaming Black, was finalized on May 12, 2012, made up of Devon "Hoodstomp" Mark and Austin "LiNk" Shin of Orbit Gaming, Lyubomir "Bloodwater" Spasov of 4Not.Fire, Christopher "Zuna" Buechter of mTw.NA, and Benny "Sycho Sid" Hung. After strong showings in various online events, CLG Black attended their first offline tournament, the GIGABYTE Esports LAN on June 15, 2012. Despite a loss to Team SoloMid in the group stages, strong showings against Team Green Forest and Team Curse allowed the team to advance to the playoffs. There, after reaching the finals, CLG Black lost to Team SoloMid once again, taking second place. On July 14, 2012, CLG Black participated in Leaguecraft ggClassic #2. Having advanced to the playoffs, they defeated Curse Gaming, but lost to Team Dynamic, dropping into the Losers Bracket. The team fought through the Losers Bracket, and faced Team Dynamic in the finals, losing once again, and finishing second.

On August 25, 2012, after a second round loss to Team Dignitas, Counter Logic Gaming Black faced Team Dynamic once more in the quarterfinals of the 2012 MLG Summer Championship, using Jason "WildTurtle" Tran in place of LiNk, who was unable to attend, and were beaten. This was the last major tournament for this short-lived CLG Black lineup; Hoodstomp announced his retirement on October 16, and on December 28, 2012, CLG Black officially disbanded. Bloodwater, Zuna, and Sycho Sid went on to play for Team Vulcun, while LiNk was moved up to the Counter Logic Gaming Prime roster, eventually replacing Michael "bigfatlp" Tang.

In January 2015, CLG formed a new secondary League of Legends team, under the moniker CLG Black, made up of Jonathan "Westrice" Nguyen, Thomas "Thinkcard" Slotkin, Brandon "Easy" Doyle, Trevor "Stixxay" Hayes, and Kenny "I KeNNy u" Nguyen. The team defeated Rock Bottom Gorillas and Team Liquid Academy In the North American Challenger Series Spring Qualifier, successfully qualifying for the Spring Split of the Riot Games NA Challenger Series, the second tier of professional League of Legends in North America. Westrice announced his retirement from professional play on February 24, 2015, before the start of the split, and was replaced by Samson "Lourlo" Jackson. After placing last in Spring, CLG Black was forced to participate in the qualifier for the Summer Split. William "Scarra" Li replaced Easy in the off-season, playing his first official match on June 3, 2015. After winning the first game of the qualifier, "Stixxay" was banned by Riot Games for two weeks due to his in-game behavior. Counter Logic Gaming Black lost both subsequent games, using Parsa "Frost" Baghai as a substitute, and so failed to qualify for the following North American Challenger Series Summer Split.

On November 5, 2015, it was announced that CLG Black was once again recruiting, with Thinkcard as the only returning player. On December 10, Tony "ZIkz" Gray confirmed a final roster of I KeNNy U, Thinkcard, Tyson "Innox" Kapler, Yuri "KEITHMCBRIEF" Jew and Petar "Unlimited" Georgiev in a comment on the /r/CLG subreddit. Three days later, the team was knocked out of the 2016 NACS Spring Split Open Qualifier by Team Liquid Academy, once again failing to qualify. The team has since been disbanded.

=== Counter-Strike: Global Offensive ===
==== CLG.CS ====
Counter Logic Gaming's potential expansion into Counter-Strike: Global Offensive was first discussed publicly in a December 2014 interview of George "HotshotGG" Georgallidis, who commented, "We're looking at all avenues. Right now we're really interested in CS:GO and Dota 2, and hopefully we'll be expanding to those areas very soon." This ambition became reality when, in early 2015, CLG signed the ex-mouseSpaz roster of Tarik "tarik" Celik, James "Hazed" Cobb, Stephen "reltuC" Cutler, Pujan "FNS" Mehta, and Peter "ptr" Gurney as CLG.CS. The team's first major event under the CLG banner was the first of three annual majors, ESL One Katowice 2015, where they dropped out in the group stages of the tournament. The team had decent success over the next few months, winning the CEVO Season 6 LAN Finals, and coming in fifth/sixth place at ESEA Global Finals Season 18, losing to European teams Fnatic and mousesports.

This middling level of success was not enough for the team, and on April 29, 2015, ptr was kicked. On May 8, the organization announced it was actively looking for a new fifth member, and on June 2, Josh "jdm64" Marzano rounded out the squad. The team went on to place fourth regionally in the online stage of ESL ESEA Pro League Season I, and so qualified for the LAN stage of the tournament. After unexpectedly taking out both Fnatic and Keyd Stars in their group, the team made it to the semifinals of the tournament, before being knocked out by Cloud9.

The team qualified for ESL One Cologne 2015 on August 2, 2015, as one of only two North American teams attending. CLG.CS performed surprisingly well at the event, but close losses against European powerhouses Ninjas in Pyjamas and Natus Vincere sent them out in the group stages. A string of mediocre domestic results bridged the gap to the last major of the year, DreamHack Open Cluj-Napoca, where Counter Logic Gaming was knocked out of their group by Natus Vincere. The remainder of the year brought equally disappointing results for the team, culminating in a last place finish at the ESL ESEA Pro League Season 2 Finals. Shortly after, on December 15, the organization announced that it was looking for a new fifth member, after FNS decided to step down from the roster. CLG announced Jacob "FugLy" Medina as their new fifth player and Faruk "pita" Pita as their head coach on January 20, 2016. FugLy left the team on March 13, 2016. Kenneth "koosta" Suen replaced jdm64 on June 13, 2016.

After ELeague Season 1 on July 14, 2016, Tarik "tarik" Celik and Faruk "pita" Pita departed from the team's active roster. Ethan "nahtE" Arnold and Yassine "Subroza" Taoufik joined the team on August 17, 2016. On November 30, 2017, CLG announced that the organization would be parting with the CS:GO team.

==== CLG Red ====
On July 5, 2015, Counter Logic Gaming announced that they had signed the ex-Ubinited roster of Christine "potter" Chi, Diane "di^" Tran, Benita "bENITA" Novshadian, Catherine "CAth" Leroux-Racette, Stephanie "missharvey" Harvey as a second, all-female, Counter -Strike: Global Offensive team, called CLG Red. Six days later, CLG.CS Red placed first at Electronic Sports World Cup 2015 CSGO Women, beating out Games4u.se Female in the final. Catherine "CAth" Leroux left the team on May 29, 2016. Klaudia "klaudia" Beczkiewicz joined as a player and Erik "da_bears" Stromberg joined as a coach on August 24, 2016. da_bears left the team six months later on February 14, 2017, who would be replaced by Cody "cubed" Thaw as head coach along with players Jennifer "refinnej" Le and Emma "Emy" Choe, replacing missharvey and klaudia. On February 13, 2018, CLG Red signed Lily "ProMise9k" Chen, to replace potter who had left the team a month prior. She would leave two months later, being replaced by missharvey on May 15. CLG Red announced the signing of Mounira "GooseBreeder" Dobie on July 12, 2018, utilizing a six-woman roster. CAth would return to the roster as a trial, replacing bENITA on the starting roster, on May 29, 2019. Head coach Stephan "vEz" Vezina, who had joined in July 2018 to replace cubed, parted ways with the team May 27, 2020. On July 9, 2020, CLG Red announced the signing of Juliana "Juli" Tosic, following the departure of bENITA in May. Viktor "flashie" Tamás Bea became the roster's final head coach on December 20, 2020. On November 1, 2021, refinnej left the roster, followed by the addition of Kelsie "uhKelsie" Click on December 13, 2021. The final iteration of the roster would be completed on August 12, 2022, with the signings of Vivienne "BiBiAhn" Quach, Coline "Kaoday" Le Floc'h and Marissa "madss" Dasta, playing alongside GooseBreeder and uhKelsie. The replacements marked the departures of di^, Emy and Juli. On April 6, 2023, Counter Logic Gaming disbanded the roster, with the players of CLG Red announcing that they had been released by the organization and had become free agents.

=== Super Smash Bros. ===
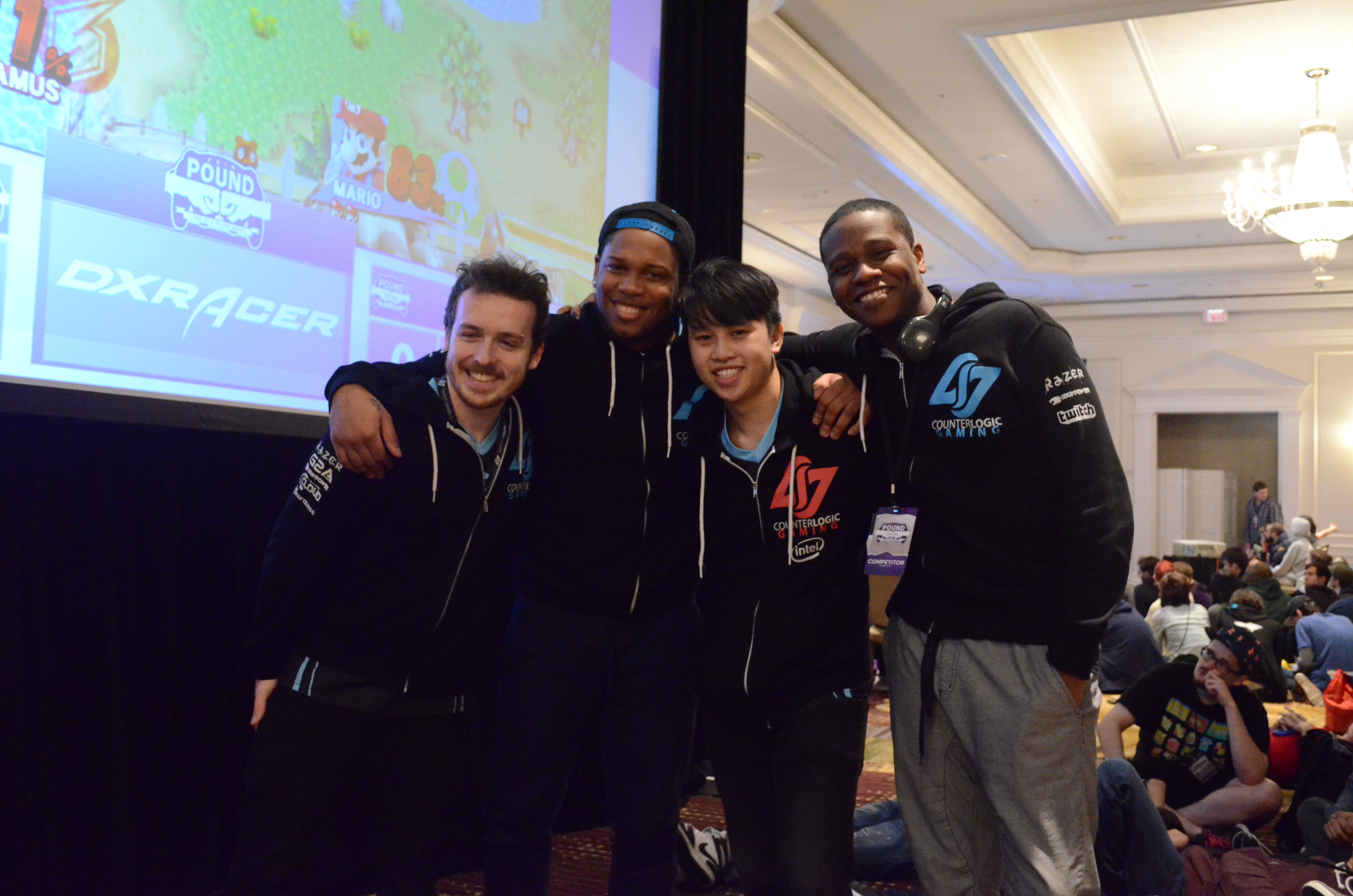
CLG's Smash players at Pound 2016. From left to right: Zac "SFAT" Cordoni, Tyrell "NAKAT" Coleman, Kevin "PewPewU" Toy & Richard "Keitaro" King Jr.

On June 14, 2015, the organization expanded into Super Smash Bros., picking up Northern California–based Melee player Kevin "PewPewU" Toy. He attended June's CEO 2015 and July's EVO 2015 under the Counter Logic Gaming brand, placing ninth place in the individual categories of each. He also placing third in doubles of the former and first place at EVO. On October 23, 2015, Counter Logic Gaming signed New Jersey–based Smash 4 player Tyrell "NAKAT" Coleman. On December 16, 2015, the organization announced that they had signed PewPewU's friend and doubles partner, North California–based Melee player Zac "SFAT" Cordini, making them among the first established Super Smash Bros. duos to be signed to the same organization. New Jersey–based competitive Smash 4 player and content creator Richard "Keitaro" King Jr. joined Counter Logic Gaming as a video editor on March 9, 2016. Southern California–based Smash 4 player James "VoiD" Makekau-Tyson joined on June 16, 2016. New York Super Smash Bros. Melee player Cody Schwab joined on January 20, 2023. Louisiana based Melee player Sasha "Magi" Sullivan joined the team on March 9, 2023.

=== Call of Duty ===
On December 2, 2015, Counter Logic Gaming announced that they had expanded into Call of Duty, after buying the roster of Anthony "Methodz" Zinni, Michael "Blfire" Glushenok, Aaron "CMPLX" Vetelino, and Tyler "FeLony" Johnson from Denial eSports.

The team's primary goal was participation in Stage 1 of the 2016 Call of Duty World League (CWL), to which end they attended the North American Pro Division Offline Qualifier. There, losses to Team EnVyUs and Team Kaliber would force CLG to attempt qualification in a second online stage. The team was one of four to qualify online, and secure a spot in the 2016 CWL.

=== Dota 2 ===
On February 2, 2012, Counter Logic Gaming picked up the unsigned eXperience Gaming roster, made up of Jonathan "Loda" Berg, Joakim "Akke" Akterhall, Jesper "Mirakel" Nyhlén, Per Anders Olsson "Pajkatt" Lille, and Alexander "Pinoy" Pettersson, under the name CLG Dota. On March 2, 2012, exactly a month later, Johan "smulgullig" Gidmark replaced Pinoy after the former acted as a stand-in for the team for minor online events. From March to August, after success in relatively minor online tournaments, CLG Dota's schedule was dominated by various more prolific online tournaments, either of the form of a group stage followed by playoff finals, or of a round-robin tournament. The first of these was Star Ladder Star Series Season 1, running from March 12 to April 29, 2012. Counter Logic Gaming placed third in the group stage, beating Darer at playoffs before losing to both Natus Vincere and Moscow Five in the Winners Bracket and Losers Bracket Finals, finishing third.

The second and third of the tournaments were ProDOTA World League Season 1 and The Premier League Season 2, taking place from April 13 to August 5, and April 17 to July 8, 2012, respectively. In the former, CLG Dota placed third in the European group stage, and beat Orange Esports and Team Infused in the playoffs, before losing to PotM Bottom in both the Winners Bracket and Grand Finals, taking home second. In the latter, which was a round-robin tournament, the team finished second behind Natus Vincere. On May 18, 2012, In the middle of these two tournaments, Loda and smulgulig left the team, and CLG picked up Rasmus "MiSeRy" Filipsen and Dominik "Lacoste" Stipic to replace them. From June 21 to August 12, 2012, after the additions to their roster, CLG Dota took part in The Defense Season 2. CLG finished second in their group behind Quantic Gaming, qualifying for the playoff stage. There they defeated mTw and mousesports to reach the Winners Bracket Final, where they lost to compLexity Gaming. The team met mousesports again in the Losers Bracket Final, but was defeated, taking home third place.

On September 29, 2012, Counter Logic Gaming was one of fourteen teams invited to attend the 2012 edition of The International, the roster's first and only LAN tournament. The event was run by Valve, the developer of Dota 2, and took place at PAX Prime in Seattle, with a $1,600,000 prize pool. The team was knocked out of the tournament in the group stage after being beaten by teams including Evil Geniuses and LGD Gaming. CLG Dota's placing was ninth to twelfth, and the team returned home with nothing. On October 15, 2012, the organization announced that MiSeRy and Pajkatt were leaving to join LGD.int. No replacements were announced. Later that month, on October 29, Akke also left the team to join No Tidehunter, and Counter Logic Gaming Dota officially disbanded.

=== Halo ===
On November 10, 2014, Counter Logic Gaming announced that they had acquired Shoot to Kill's Halo roster, made up of Richard "Heinz" Heinz, Halo veteran Tom "OGRE2" Ryan, Paul "SnakeBite" Duarte, Gerson "OgrEe" Baum, and Matthew "Royal 2" Fiorante, alongside their coach, Chris "Royal 1" Fiorante. Counter Logic Gaming Halo was picked up before the start of the official Halo Championship Series (HCS). After joining the organization, CLG Halo found immediate success, taking successive victories in ESL's HCS Pre-Cup Tournaments #1 and #2, beating other top teams including Evil Geniuses, OpTic Gaming, and Cloud9. Despite being eliminated in the round of sixty four by Evil Geniuses at HCS Season One Cup #1, the team recovered in December 2014 at the first HCS LAN Event: Iron Games Columbus, claiming first place after facing Evil Geniuses once more in the finals, and becoming the first winners of an HCS LAN event.

After this strong run, CLG Halo came into HCS S1 Cup #2 as first seed, but was upset by Denial eSports in the quarterfinals. In January 2015, due to their previous success, the team was able to hold on to their seeding going into the second LAN event of the season: UGC St. Louis. After reaching the Winners Bracket Final, they faced off against Denial, and were again defeated. After defeating Evil Geniuses in the Losers Bracket Final, the team had to face Denial once more in the Grand Final, and were once more defeated by them, claiming second. Despite repeatedly failing to win a tournament, CLG's relative consistency netted them the first seed for HCS S1 Cup #3, and the team looked to reassert themselves here. After breezing through the first few rounds, CLG found themselves in the finals against a familiar Denial team. CLG were finally able to overcome their opponents, and won their first official HCS Online Cup on January 11, 2015.

On January 25, 2015, CLG was taken out by Cloud9 in the semifinals of HCS S1 Cup #4, netting them another top 4 finish. In each of the next three HCS S1 Cups, #5, #6, and #7, CLG was eliminated by the newly formed Noble Black roster, leading fans to question whether CLG Halo would still perform well at LAN. On February 21, at Gamers For Giving 2015, CLG met Noble Black in round four. Despite their troubles in the online cups, CLG swept their opponents to advance to the next round. After losing a close series against OpTic Gaming, the team was forced into the Losers Bracket, where they beat eLevate, Cloud9, and OpTic to meet Evil Geniuses in the Grand Final. Evil Geniuses took a flawless series against Counter Logic Gaming Halo, and also took the first seed going into the HCS Season One Finals. At the HCS Season One Finals at PAX East, CLG lost to Evil Geniuses in the Winners Bracket Final, before defeating Noble Black in the Losers Bracket Final. Facing Evil Geniuses for a second time in the tournament on March 8, 2015, CLG Halo was again outclassed, ending both the tournament and the season with another second-place finish.

On March 13, 2015, Heinz confirmed on Twitter that he had been released. Counter Logic Gaming announced later that day that they had acquired Denial eSports' Scottie "Cloud" Holste to take his place. In April, at the first LAN of HCS Season Two: Iron Games Atlanta 2015, CLG Halo defeated Cloud9, before losing yet another series to Evil Geniuses, and falling into the Losers Bracket. There, CLG was defeated by Winterfox, and claimed fifth place after beating out OpTic Gaming in a consolation match, their first below second placing at an HCS LAN. Following HCS Season Two Cup #1, Ogre2 went on vacation, leaving the team with sub Weston "Clutch" Price to fill his role for the next two cups, in which the team placed top 16 and top 8 respectively.

OGRE2's return would not immediately lead to better fortunes for Counter Logic Gaming, as the team finished top 8 in HCS S2 Cup #4. However, on June 7, 2015, they earned their highest placing of the season, finishing third in HCS S2 Cup #5. They repeated this finish in HCS S2 Cup #6, before finishing top 8 in HCS S2 Cup #7, the final cup of the season. Later in June, CLG went into HCS LAN Indianapolis holding fifth seed, and was knocked out of the Winners Bracket relatively early on by Cloud9. Despite an impressive Losers Bracket run, they were beaten in the Grand Final by Evil Geniuses. This second-place finish was enough to secure them the fourth seed going into the HCS Season 2 Finals, which started on July 24, 2015. At the finals, CLG was once again forced into the Losers Bracket, this time by Evil Geniuses. Wins against OpTic Gaming, Cloud9, and Denial eSports took the team into the Grand Final, where they met Evil Geniuses for the last time that season. CLG managed their first and only Season Two victory against Evil Geniuses, but lost the second, deciding series, relegating Counter Logic Gaming Halo to successive second place season finishes.

On December 2, 2015, the organization announced the release of Cloud, and the acquisition of Bradley "Frosty" Bergstrom, and on January 28, 2016, it was announced that OGRE2 was being replaced by Tony "Lethxl" Campbell. Later in the year OpTic Gaming acquired the CLG Halo team

Awards and achievements
Preceded by Team SoloMid	North American League of Legends Championship Series winner Summer 2015–Spring 2016	Succeeded by Incumbent
