= Stixxay =

American League of Legends player

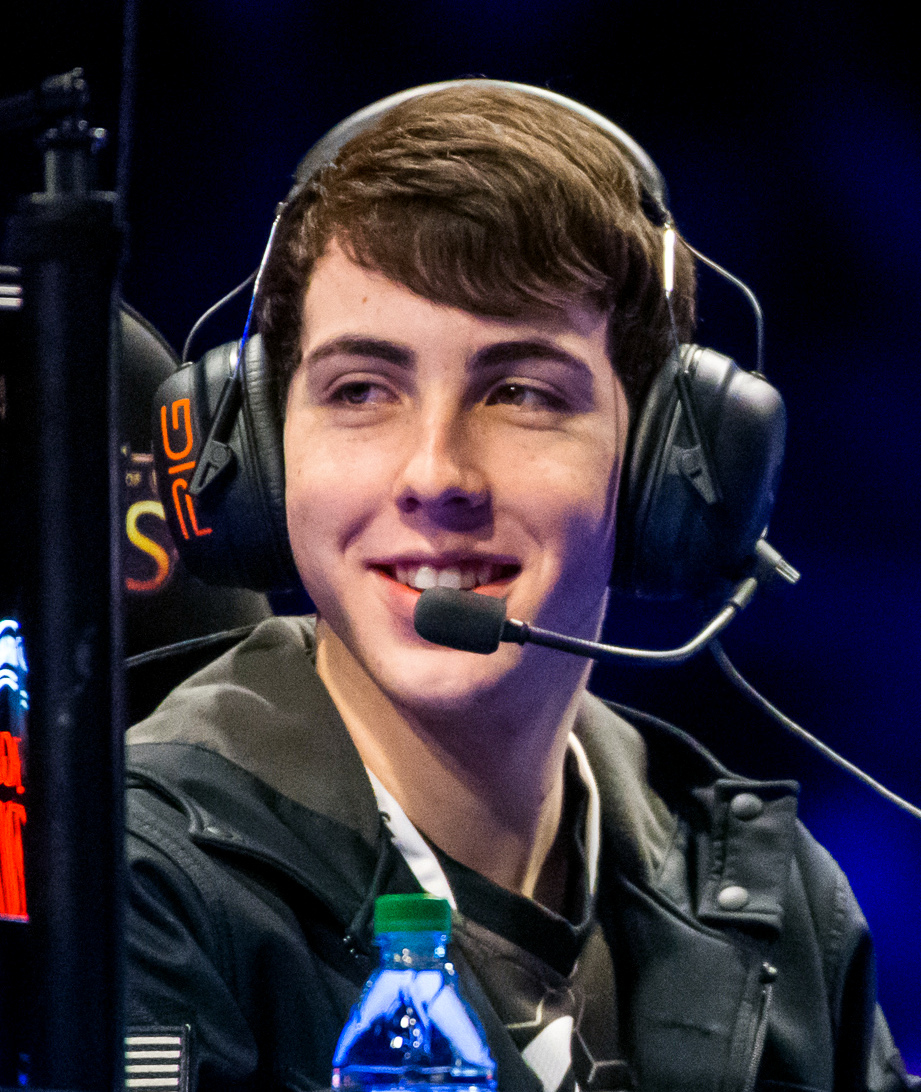
- Hayes in 2016

Personal information
- Name: Trevor Hayes
- Nationality: American

Career information
- Games: League of Legends
- Playing career: 2014–2023

Team history
- 2014: Denial eSports
- 2015: CLG Black
- 2016–2020: Counter Logic Gaming
- 2021–2023: Golden Guardians

Career highlights and awards
- NA LCS champion (2016 Spring)

Trevor Hayes, better known as Stixxay, is an American professional League of Legends player.

== Career ==
Stixxay started his League of Legends professional career as the starting ADC for CLG's Challenger NA team CLG Black and substitute ADC for Misfits. In the 2015 Spring Challenger Series, CLG Black and Stixxay finished 2–8. In November 2015 he was elevated to the main team, replacing Peter "Doublelift" Peng as bot laner. At the 2016 Mid-Season Invitational, Stixxay led the invitational in most kills (70). Stixxay won the 2016 North American League of Legends Championship Series Spring Split with CLG.

He was a player for Golden Guardians, and in January 2022 he stepped down as a player and transferred to a coaching role at Golden Guardians.

== Tournament results ==
- 1st — 2016 Spring NA LCS playoffs
- 2nd — 2016 Mid-Season Invitational
- 4th — 2016 NA LCS Summer regular season
- 4th — 2016 NA LCS Summer playoffs

== Individual achievements ==
- 1x NA LCS Finals MVP (Spring 2016)
- 1x MSI Group Stage All-Tournament team (2016)
