= HotshotGG =

Canadian esports player (born 1990)

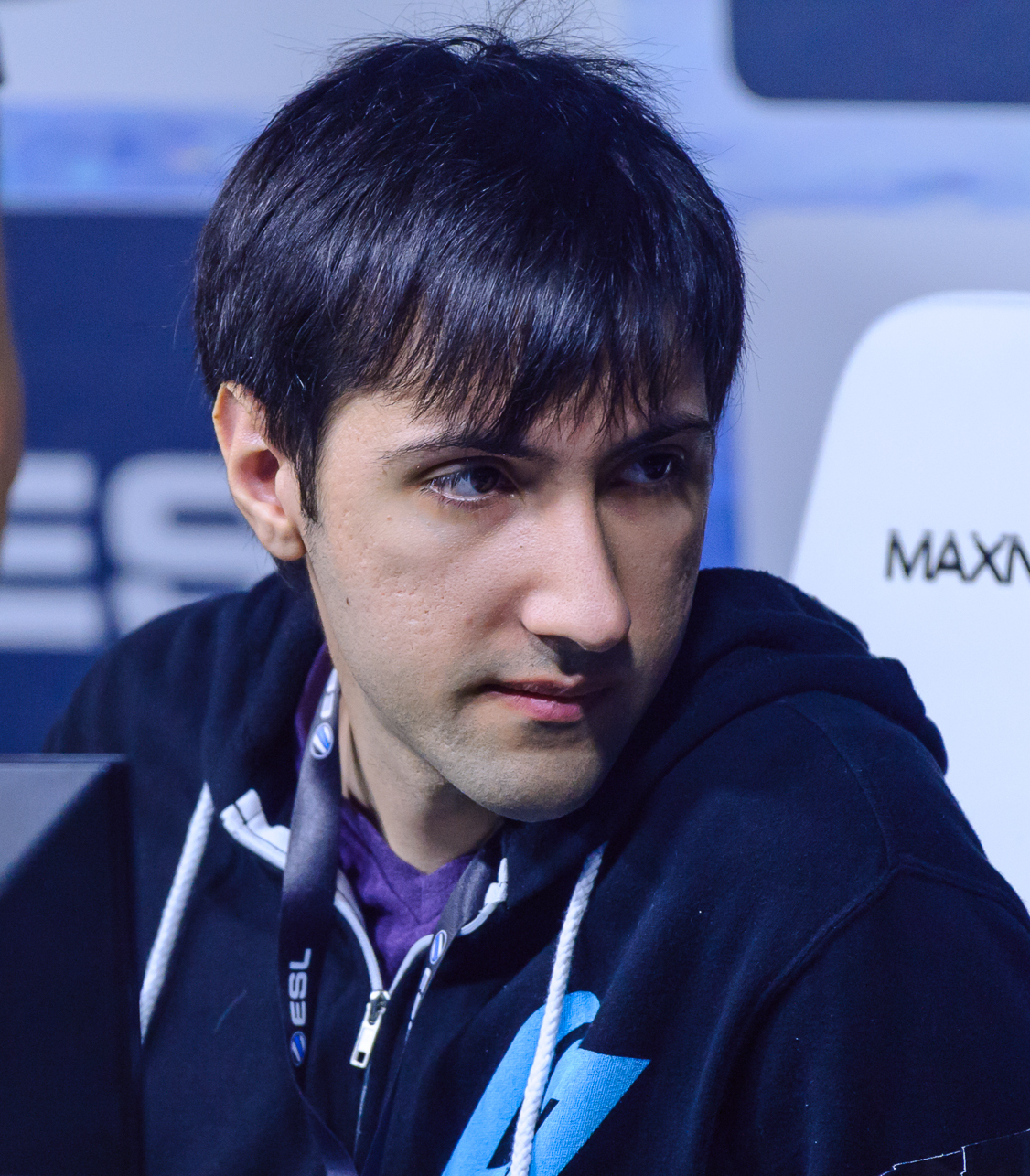
- Georgallidis in 2015

Personal information
- Name: George Georgallidis
- Born: June 23, 1990 (age 36)
- Nationality: Canadian

Career information
- Games: League of Legends
- Playing career: 2010–2013

Team history
- 2010–2013: Counter Logic Gaming

George Georgallidis (born June 23, 1990), better known as HotshotGG, is a Canadian former esports player. He is the founder and owner of Counter Logic Gaming, a professional esports organization.

== Biography ==
George Georgallidis founded Counter Logic Gaming in April 2010. Georgallidis has since led the organization's teams to success across multiple esports titles, including League of Legends, Counter-Strike: Global Offensive, Halo, and Super Smash Bros.. Following the 2013 NA LCS Spring Split, George stepped down as a player to take a managerial role in the team. He was replaced with Nientonsoh on May 26, 2013.

== Tournament results ==
=== Counter Logic Gaming ===
- 1st — 2010 World Cyber Games Grand Finals
- 3rd — 2011 World Cyber Games Grand Finals
- 2nd — MLG 2012 - Spring Championship
