= Magi (gamer) =

American esports player

Personal information
- Name: Sasha Italia Sullivan
- Nationality: American

Career information
- Game: Super Smash Bros. Melee

Team history
- 2021–2023: Beastcoast
- 2023: Counter Logic Gaming

Sasha Italia Sullivan, known by her gaming handle Magi, is an American professional Super Smash Bros. Melee player from Baton Rouge, Louisiana.

Sullivan began her competitive gaming career in 2015. Mainly using the character Falco Lombardi, Sullivan's improving tournament placements led her to be ranked as a top 100 Melee player in the world by 2018, according to power rankings presented by Red Bull and esports team Panda. She is the first woman to appear on formal power rankings of Melee players.

Sullivan was sponsored by the esports team Beastcoast from 2021 to 2023, and was briefly sponsored by Counter Logic Gaming prior to its dissolution in 2023. Panda ranked her as the 21st best Melee player in early 2022.

== Career ==
=== Early career (2014–2018) ===
Sasha Italia Sullivan competed in Yu-Gi-Oh! Trading Card Game tournaments at a young age, during which she started to go by the handle "Magi". Her interest in playing the fighting game Super Smash Bros. Melee grew in January 2014 after she watched The Smash Brothers, a documentary series on the history of professional Melee competition. She then began to attend tournaments for Project M, a fan-made modification of Super Smash Bros. Brawl, and in 2015 began to seriously compete in Melee tournaments. After she started to attend more tournaments in 2018, she eventually rose to the top placing on her state's community-organized power rankings by the spring of that year. Later in 2018 she would achieve high placements at major tournaments, specifically a 17th-place finish at Community Effort Orlando (CEO), 49th place at The Big House, and 5th place at DreamHack Austin. Power rankings presented by esports team Panda (Note: According to Kotaku, the Panda Global Rankings are peer-administered power rankings of Super Smash Bros. players generally respected by the competitive gaming community.) in 2018 ranked Sullivan as the 97th best Melee player in the world. This made her the first player from Louisiana, the first woman player, and the first transgender player to appear on formal power rankings for Melee.

=== Sponsorships and continued success (2018–present) ===
Sullivan, then ranked as the 98th best Melee player by Panda, upset top player Joseph "Mang0" Marquez at GENESIS 6 in 2019. She rose to 43rd place on Panda's power rankings for the following year; the entry on her power ranking highlighted her victory against Mang0 and four tournament placements earlier that year: 7th place at CEO 2019, 1st place at We Need Some Space II, 2nd place at DreamHack Dallas 2019, and 2nd place at Fortcon 2019.

In 2020, Sullivan placed 13th at two events, Smash Summit 9 and Smash Summit 10 Online, both invitational tournaments consisting of a small group of top Melee players. The latter tournament was held online amidst the COVID-19 pandemic. Due to the pandemic, there were no formal player rankings released from 2019 to 2021. In 2021, Sullivan placed 4th at Low Tide City 2021, 13th at Mainstage 2021, 7th at Smash Summit 12, and 9th at the Smash World Tour 2021 Championships. She also secured a sponsorship from esports organization Beastcoast, which sponsored top professional Johnny "S2J" Kim and match commentator Brandon "HomeMadeWaffles" Collier.

Sullivan's placements in major tournaments in 2022 include 13th at GENESIS 9, 2nd at DreamHack Dallas 2022, 2nd at CEO 2022, and 7th at Double Down. At CEO 2022, she notably defeated top player Justin "Plup" McGrath before reaching the grand finals. She also participated in the 2022 Ludwig Smash Invitational, organized by live streamer and former Melee commentator Ludwig Ahgren. Panda later ranked Sullivan as the 21st best Melee player through early 2022.

In March 2023, Sullivan ended her sponsorship with Beastcoast and joined Counter Logic Gaming's roster, although Counter Logic Gaming was dissolved less than a month later. She finished in 2nd place at the Melee event at Combo Breaker 2024 in Chicago.

== Personal life ==
Sullivan is from Baton Rouge, Louisiana. She is a graduate of Louisiana State University, where she studied sociology.

Sullivan is a transgender woman. In a 2022 interview with her university's student newspaper, she credited other professional video game players who are transgender, such as Ricki Ortiz and Scarlett, with easing her doubts on whether she would find success as a transgender player in the Melee gaming community. Sullivan spoke in an online panel discussion at the 2021 Athena Film Festival about how she found an online community where she could comfortably express herself when she was young. She has also said success in her gaming career "transformed my life completely" and has allowed her to live on her own, independent of her family.
