= Moscow Five =

Russian professional esports organization

- Short name: M5
- Divisions: League of Legends
- Founded: 2001; 24 years ago
- Location: Russia
- Owner: Dmitry "ddd1ms" Smilianets
- Head coach: Vladimir "Halbua" Borodin
- Website: www.m5.gg

Moscow Five is a Russian esports organization founded in 2001. The organization currently has a professional League of Legends team. On 16 December 2011, Moscow Five created what one could describe as one of the most successful international teams in the history of League of Legends. In 2013 former Moscow Five owner Dmitry "ddd1ms" Smilianets was arrested for his alleged involvement in "one of the largest" hacking and data breach schemes history in a global operation by the FBI's Cyber Division. Moscow Five's League of Legends team quickly reformed as Gambit Gaming under Pikiner's leadership.

Moscow Five returned to the professional League of Legends scene in 2014 and 2019 with new CIS teams.

== Counter-Strike ==
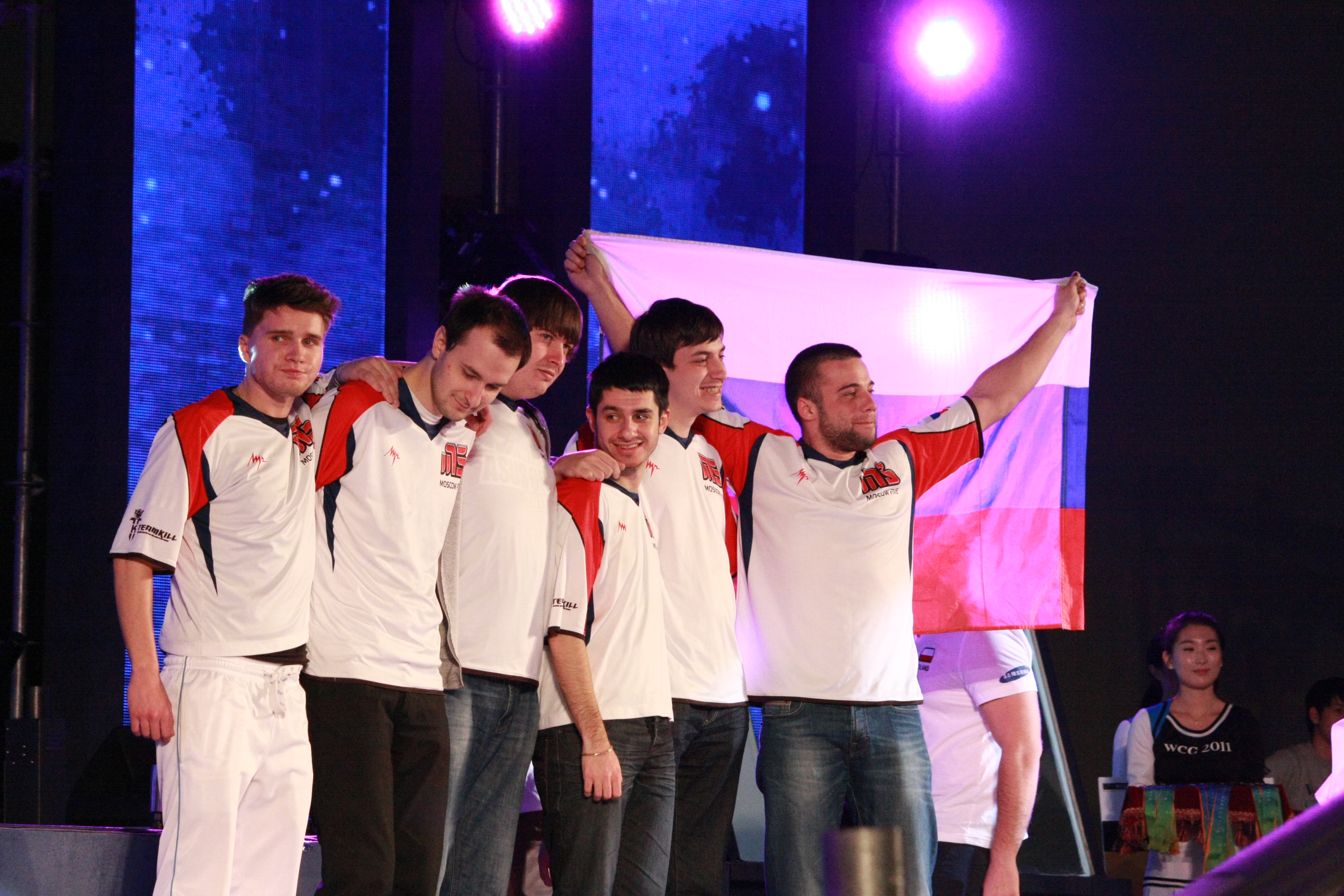
Moscow Five at WCG 2011

Moscow Five's Counter-Strike team won bronze at the 2011 World Cyber Games.

== League of Legends ==
=== Former EU LCS roster ===
Moscow Five League of Legends roster
Players
Coaches

Role	Handle	Name	Nationality
Top	Darien	Eugene Mazaev	Russia
Jungle	Diamondprox	Danil Reshetnikov	Russia
Mid	Alex Ich	Aleksei Ichetovkin	Russia
Bot	Genja	Eugene Andryushin	Russia
Support	Edward	Edward Abgaryan	Armenia

Head coach

Konstantin "Groove" Pikiner

Legend:
- (I) Inactive
- (S) Suspended
- Substitute
- (injured) Injury / Illness

=== Achievements ===
- 3rd–4th — Season 2 World Championship
- 1st — IEM Season VI - World Championship
