= Denial Esports =

Former esports organization based in the United States

- Nicknames: The Wolf Pack
- Divisions: Call of Duty; Counter-Strike: Global Offensive; Halo; Heroes of the Storm; League of Legends; Overwatch; Paladins; Smite
- Founded: June 4, 2013
- Folded: May 31, 2019
- Location: United States; United Kingdom (CoD); South America (CS:GO)
- Owner: Robert Bowling
- CEO: Robby "Ringokid" Ringnalda
- Partners: OPSEAT; META Threads; Razer; Twitch
- Website: www.denialesports.com

Denial Esports (previously stylized as Denial eSports) was a professional esports organization based in the United States. They were most well known for their Call of Duty team being 2015 world champions, having won the Call of Duty Championship 2015.

Former Infinity Ward development lead Robert Bowling bought the team on January 14, 2016.

In September 2017, the organization went inactive and their website went down due to issues paying players and staff. The organization later resumed operations, but was dissolved on 31 May 2019.

== Call of Duty ==
=== Roster ===
| Nat. | ID | Name | Join date |
|---|---|---|---|
| (United Kingdom) | Joee | Joseph Pinnington | April 11, 2018 |
| (United Kingdom) | Rated | Rhys Price | April 19, 2019 |
| (United Kingdom) | Bance | Ben Bance | April 19, 2019 |
| (United Kingdom) | Alexx | Alex Carpenter | April 19, 2019 |
| (Russia) | Soviet | Colby Privozny | November 19, 2014 |
| (France) | ZeeK (sub.) | Ryan Lapierre | January 29, 2019 |

=== Tournament results ===
- 1st — Call of Duty Championship 2015
- 2nd — ESWC Zénith 2015
- 2nd — MLG World Finals 2015

== Counter-Strike: Global Offensive ==
=== Roster ===
| Nat. | ID | Name | Join Time |
|---|---|---|---|
| (Mexico) | Blue | Carlos Arestegui | April 4, 2019 |
| (Mexico) | Link | Eduardo osuna | April 4, 2019 |
| (Peru) | vaatinator | Julio Jimenez | April 4, 2019 |
| (Mexico) | sam_A | Jesus Taboada | April 4, 2019 |
| (Colombia) | sickLyCS | Juanes Valencia | April 4, 2019 |
| (Venezuela) | Emmet | Eli Pachano (coach) | April 4, 2019 |

== Heroes of Newerth ==
Denial's Heroes of Newerth squad got 2nd at DreamHack Winter 2013 with a squad of Pontus "Zlapped" Mähler, David "Probusk" Busk, Dennis "Flensmeister" Brofalk, Micke "m'ICKe" Nguyen, Son "VnSensation" Nguyen.

== Paladins ==
=== Former ===
- Zach "Shadeey" Shades" Gilbert (Damage)
- Steven "Awry" Michalec (Support)
- Chris "Bitey" Mohn (Flex, Captain)
- David "Stolzey" Mathis (Damage)
- Noah "W1fL" Mathis (Tank)
- "PrinceDannyTv" (Flank)
- Kamlin “Kenzo” Subido Dunn (Tank)
- Bryce "Vex30" Kelly (Support)
- Cornslays (Coach)
- Hawker2255 (Flex)

== Fighting game players ==
=== Former ===
- Chris Tatarian (Street Fighter V)
- Mike "Danke" Schiller (Ultimate Marvel vs. Capcom 3, BlazBlue)
- Ernesto "Dios X" Ojeda (Ultimate Marvel vs. Capcom 3)
- James "Duck" Ma (Super Smash Bros. Melee)
- Tyler "Marss" Martins (Super Smash Bros. for Wii U)
- Stone Nguyen (Ultimate Marvel vs. Capcom 3)
- Andrew "iCranKiesT" Mendizabal (Street Fighter V)

| Preceded by compLexity Gaming | Call of Duty Championship winner 2015 | Succeeded by to be determined |
