= League of Legends: Season 2 World Championship =

2012 esports tournament

Season 2 World Championship
- 2012

Tournament information
- Sport: League of Legends
- Location: Los Angeles, California
- Dates: October 4–October 13
- Administrator: Riot Games
- Venue: Galen Center
- Teams: 12
- Purse: US$2,000,000

Final positions
- Champion: Taipei Assassins
- Runner-up: Azubu Frost

Tournament statistics
- Matches played: 31

The League of Legends: Season 2 World Championship was an esports tournament for the multiplayer online battle arena video game League of Legends, held from October 4 to October 13, 2012, in Los Angeles, California. It was the second iteration of the League of Legends World Championship, an annual international tournament organized by the game's developer, Riot Games. The tournament was won by Taipei Assassins who defeated Azubu Frost 3–1 in the final.

== Background ==
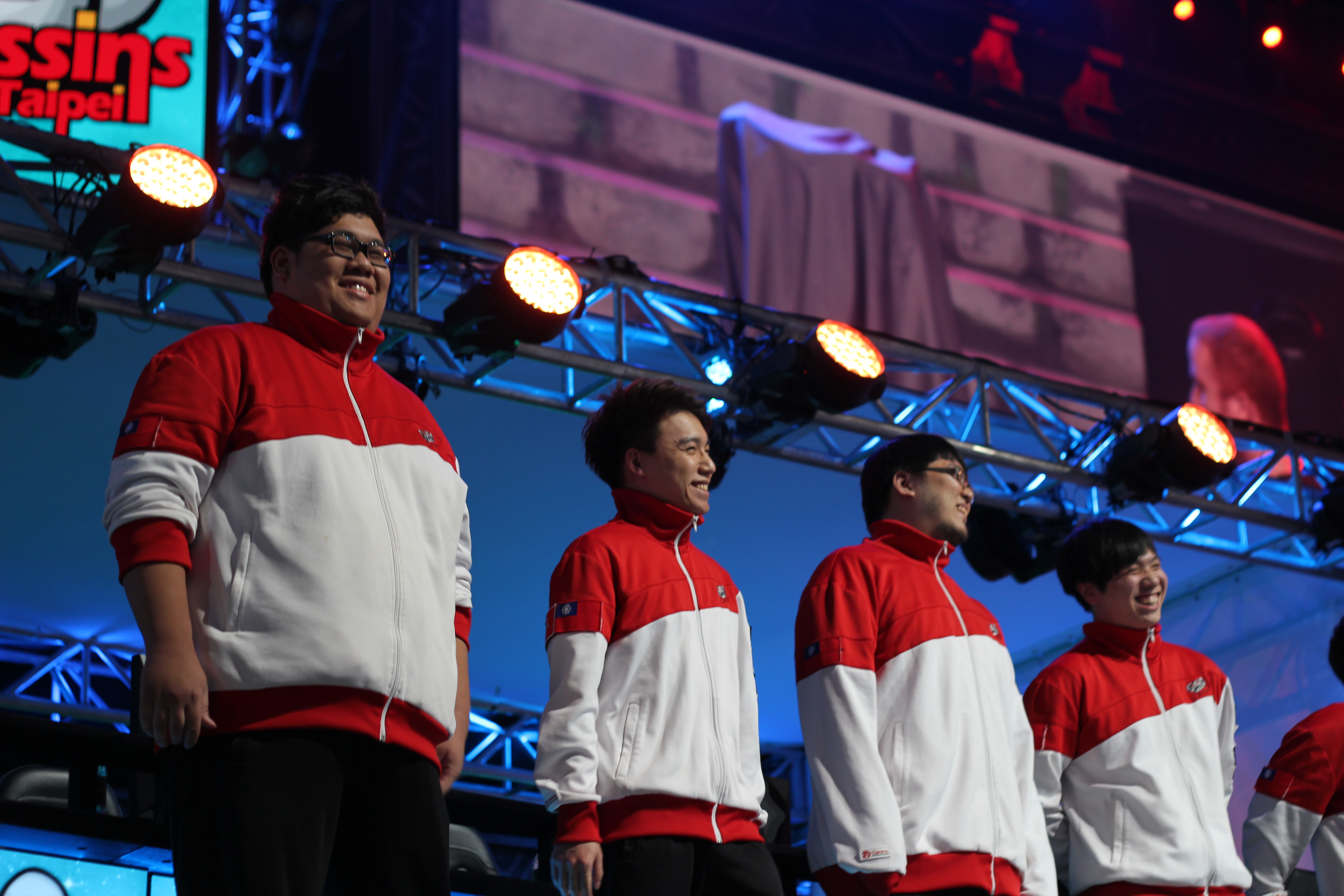
Taipei Assassins, the champions of season 2

After Season 1, Riot announced that US$5,000,000 would be paid out over Season 2. Of this $5 million, $2 million went to Riot's partners including the IGN Pro League and other major esports associations. Another $2 million went to Riot's Season 2 qualifiers and championship. The final $1 million went to other organizers who applied to Riot to host independent League of Legends tournaments.

The Season 2 World Championship was held in early October 2012 in Los Angeles, California to conclude the US$5 million season. Twelve qualifying teams from around the world participated in the championship, which boasted the largest prize pool in the history of e-sports tournaments at the time at US$2 million, US$1 million going to the champions, until The International 2013 beat it the next year. The group stage, quarterfinal, and semifinal matches took place between October 4 and 6. The grand final took place a week after, on October 13 in the University of Southern California's Galen Center in front of 10,000 fans, and were broadcast in 13 different languages. In the grand final, Taiwan's professional team Taipei Assassins triumphed over South Korea's Azubu Frost 3-to-1 and claimed the US$1 million in prize money.

Over 8 million viewers tuned in to the Season 2 World Championship broadcast, with a maximum of 1.1 million concurrent viewers during the grand final, making the Season 2 World Championship the most watched esports event in history at the time.

=== Controversies ===
==== Format ====
Several top teams missed out on the World Championship, including S1 champions Fnatic and Azubu Blaze. (Till 2022, Fnatic had only missed the Worlds for two times, the second was in 2016.)

==== Cheating incident ====
During the quarterfinal round of the Season 2 World Championship, Jang Gun Woong of team Azubu Frost cheated by turning his head to look at the big screen which was positioned behind him. The screen, which presents an overview of the game, is meant to be watched only by the crowd, as it displays elements that are supposed to be hidden from the players inside the game. This led to Azubu Frost being fined US$30,000.

==== Technical issues ====
During the last quarterfinal best-of-three match on October 6 between European team Counter Logic Gaming EU and Chinese team Team WE, multiple technical difficulties occurred. Roughly twenty minutes into the second game, the network connection in the arena went down, terminating the live stream on Twitch and disconnecting all ten players from the game, forcing a remake of the game. Then, roughly sixty minutes into the third game, the network went down again. A final attempt was made at finishing the third game, but due to more network outages and technical issues, including a player's defective computer which had to be replaced, the last game and the following semifinals were rescheduled to be played on October 10 in the Galen Center, which was still undergoing construction work. The cause of the connection issues is uncertain, but is suspected to have been caused by faulty hardware. This incident, which was called "拔网线"(lit:unplugging the network cable) by many Chinese LoL fans, was seemed as a conspiracy that denied Team WE from winning the championship, whom later won the IPL5 by beating Azubu Blaze, Moscow Five, CLG Europe and Fnatic.

== Qualification ==
The Participants qualified through the Regional Finals:

- China: July 26 – Shanghai, China at China Joy – 2 teams
- Europe: August 16 – Cologne, Germany at Gamescom – 3 teams
- North America: August 30 – Seattle, United States at PAX Prime – 3 teams
- Taiwan/Hong Kong/Macau: September 1 – Taipei, Taiwan at G1 – 1 team
- Southeast Asia: September 9 – Da Nang, Vietnam at Tien Son Sports Palace – 1 team
- South Korea: September 21 – Seoul, Korea at the OGN eSports Stadium – 2 teams

== Teams ==
Of the five first seeds of five regions (China, Europe, North America, South Korea, Taiwan/Hong Kong/Macau) a random drawing was done to determine which four teams skip the group stage

- The random drawing determined that Azubu Frost would go to the Group stage while the others received a bye

Region	Path	Team	ID
Starting in the Playoff stage
China	Most Circuit Points	Team WE	WE
Europe	Regional Finals Winner	Moscow Five	M5
North America	Regional Finals Winner	Team SoloMid	TSM
TW/HK/MO	Regional Finals Winner	Taipei Assassins	TPA
Starting in the Group stage
South Korea	Summer Champion	Azubu Frost	AZF
South Korea	Regional Finals Winner	NaJin Sword	NJS
China	Regional Finals Runner-Up	Invictus Gaming	IG
Europe	Regional Finals Runner-up	SK Gaming	SK
Europe	Regional Finals 3rd Place	CLG Europe	CLG.EU
North America	Regional Finals Runner-up	Team Dignitas	DIG
North America	Regional Finals 3rd Place	CLG Prime	CLG.NA
Southeast Asia	Regional Finals Winner	Saigon Jokers	SAJ

== Venues ==
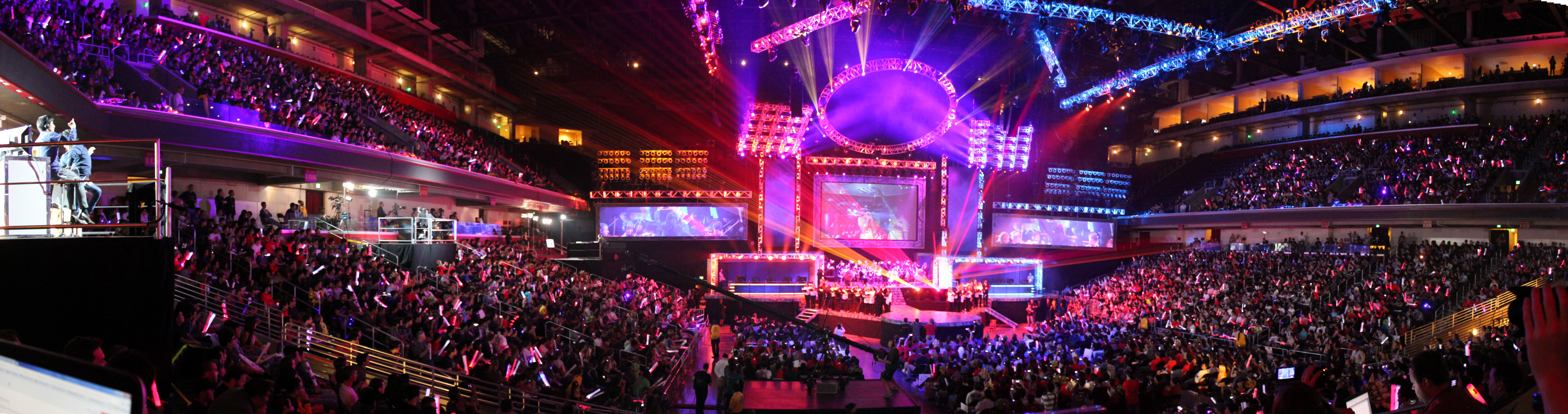
Galen Center for the finals

Los Angeles was selected as the host city for the World Championship.

United States
Los Angeles
Groups and Quarterfinals	Semifinals and Final
L.A. Live	Galen Center
Capacity: 2,300	Capacity: 10,258
League of Legends: Season 2 World Championship is located in the United States

== Group stage ==
The group stage consisted of eight teams, which were drawn into two groups of four according to their seeding. Teams from the same region could not be placed in the same group. The stage was played in a single round-robin format, with all matches contested as best-of-one. In cases where teams finished with identical win–loss and head-to-head records, a tiebreaker match was held to determine first or second place. The top two teams from each group advanced to the playoff stage, while the bottom two were eliminated.

=== Group A ===
Pos	Team	Pld	W	L	PCT	Qualification
1	Azubu Frost	3	3	0	1.000	Advance to knockout stage
2	Invictus Gaming	3	2	1	.667	Advance to knockout stage
3	CLG Prime	3	1	2	.333	
4	SK Gaming	3	0	3	.000	

=== Group B ===
Pos	Team	Pld	W	L	PCT	Qualification
1	NaJin Sword	3	3	0	1.000	Advance to knockout stage
2	CLG Europe	3	2	1	.667	Advance to knockout stage
3	Saigon Jokers	3	1	2	.333	
4	Team Dignitas	3	0	3	.000	

== Knockout stage ==
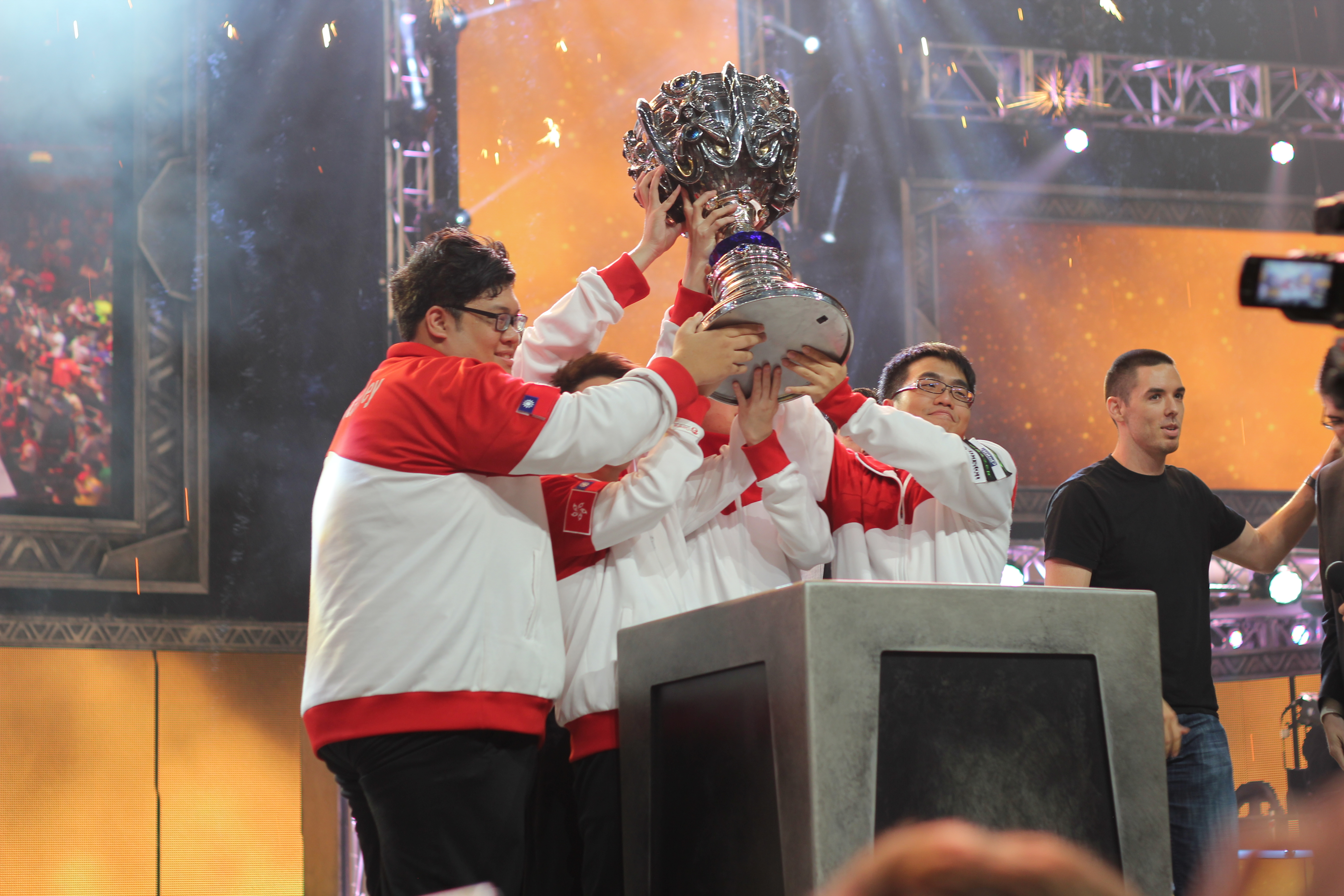
Taipei Assassins lifting the championship trophy

The knockout stage featured eight teams that were drawn into a single-elimination bracket. All matches were played as best-of-three series, with the exception of the final, which was contested as a best-of-five. The auto-qualified team was matched against an opponent from the group stage, and teams that had originated from the same group were placed on opposite sides of the bracket, preventing them from meeting until the final.

Quarterfinals
AQ	Moscow Five	2
A2	Invictus Gaming	0
AQ	Taipei Assassins	2
B1	NaJin Sword	0
AQ	Team SoloMid	0
A1	Azubu Frost	2
AQ	Team WE	1
B2	CLG Europe	2

Semifinals
Moscow Five	1
Taipei Assassins	2
Azubu Frost	2
CLG Europe	1

Final
Taipei Assassins	3
Azubu Frost	1

== Final standings ==
Place	Team	Prize money
1st	Taipei Assassins	$1,000,000
2nd	Azubu Frost	$250,000
3rd–4th	Moscow Five	$150,000
3rd–4th	CLG Europe	$150,000
5th–8th	Invictus Gaming	$75,000
5th–8th	NaJin Sword	$75,000
5th–8th	Team SoloMid	$75,000
5th–8th	Team WE	$75,000
9th–10th	CLG Prime	$50,000
9th–10th	Saigon Jokers	$50,000
11th–12th	SK Gaming	$25,000
11th–12th	Team Dignitas	$25,000
