= A1 Esports =

Bangladesh-based esports organization

- Short name: A1
- Founded: February 2020
- League: PMSL CSA
- Location: Bangladesh
- CEO: MD Abdul Jabbar Shakil
- Divisions: PUBG Mobile
- Motto: Be the One, Be A1
- Website: a1esportsbd.com

A1 Esports is a Bangladeshi professional esports organization focused on PUBG Mobile and Garena Free Fire.They are the first Bangladeshi team to play in PUBG Mobile Global Championship (PMGC).

== History ==
In February 2020, A1 Esports made their first appearance in PUBG Mobile Club Open (PMCO) Spring Split 2020 but did not qualify for the next round. In August 2020, they participated in the Fall Split of the tournament and manage to qualify for the PUBG Mobile Pro League (PMPL) Fall Split 2020. In that tournament, they finished in 3rd place and qualified for the PUBG Mobile Global Championship (PMGC) 2020.

In July 2021, they donated US$44,000 to UNICEF.

In May 2024, A1 Esports qualified for the PUBG Mobile Super League (PMSL) Spring 2024, which was held offline in Nepal. In June, they qualified for the grand finals of the tournament, where the top 5 teams qualified for the PUBG Mobile World Cup (PMWC) 2024.

In August 2024, A1 Esports has headed to Nepal to play PUBG Mobile Super League (PMSL) Fall 2024, where the top 4 teams qualified for the PUBG Mobile Global Championship (PMGC) 2024.

In May 2025, A1 Esports became the champion of the PUBG Mobile National Championship (PMNC) Bangladesh Spring 2025 and qualified for the PUBG Mobile Super League (PMSL) CSA Spring 2025, which will be held in Kazakhstan, where the top 3 teams qualified for the PUBG Mobile World Cup (PMWC) 2025.

On 31 October 2026, A1 Esports signed a roster for the mobile battle royale game Garena Free Fire.

== Roster ==
A1 Esports Free Fire roster

Handle	Name	Nationality	Join date
AZOIC	Mohammad Tozammel Haque Momin	Bangladesh	2026-10-31
RASEL	Rahinul Islam	Bangladesh	2026-10-31
TAJZ	Tanvir Hasan Taj	Bangladesh	2026-10-31
TOKI	Toki Ahmed	Bangladesh	2026-10-31

A1 Esports PUBG Mobile roster
Players
Coaches

Handle	Name	Nationality
9Tdegree	Yeash Khandakar	Bangladesh
ROWDY	Emon Sheikh	Bangladesh
DeathStorm	Hasan Mahmood	Bangladesh
CJboyy	Tahmid Aronno	Bangladesh
Flash	Tausif Rahman	Bangladesh

Head coach

- Vacant

Legend:
- (I) Inactive
- (S) Suspended
- Substitute
- (injured) Injury / Illness

Latest roster transaction: July 10, 2025.

== See also ==
- PUBG Mobile
- Esports
