= PUBG Mobile Super League CSA Spring 2025 =

PUBG Mobile tournament

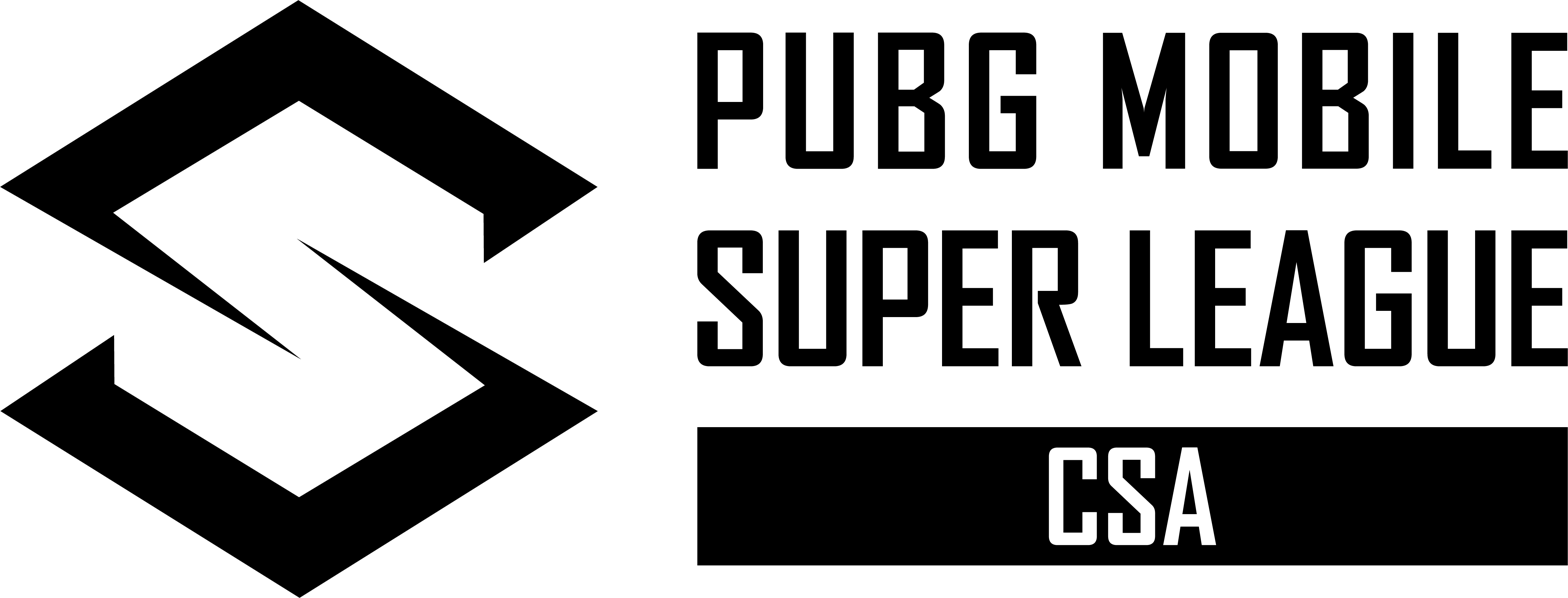

Tournament information
- Game: PUBG Mobile
- Dates: 12–22 June 2025
- Administrator: Level Infinite, Krafton, NODWIN Gaming
- Tournament format: Battle Royale
- Host: Kazakhstan
- Venue: (Kazakhstan) Almaty
- Participants: 20 teams
- Purse: $200,000
- Website: https://esports.pubgmobile.com

Final positions
- Champion: (Mongolia) Alpha Gaming
- 1st runner-up: (Nepal) Horaa Esports
- 2nd runner-up: (Pakistan) 4Thrives Esports
- MVP: (Mongolia) TOP (APG)

The PUBG Mobile Super League – Central & South Asia Spring 2025 (PMSL CSA Spring 2025) was the third season of the professional regional PUBG Mobile esports league PUBG Mobile Super League CSA, organized by Krafton, Level Infinite, and NODWIN Gaming. The event took place from June 12 to June 22, 2025, in Kazakhstan, featuring 20 teams from Central Asia and South Asia who competed for a $200,000 USD prize pool and three qualification slots for the PUBG Mobile World Cup 2025.

== Participating teams ==
Here are the participating teams of PUBG Mobile Super League CSA Spring 2025:

Region	Event	Qualification method	Team name
Central Asia	Invited		(Russia) Team Spirit
Central Asia	Invited		(Russia) Al Qadsiah
Central Asia	Invited		(Russia) Virtus.pro
Central Asia	Invited		(Ukraine) Natus Vincere
Central Asia	PUBGM Central Asia Play-in	PUBGM Central Asia Play-in 2025 Champion	(Mongolia) Alpha Gaming
Central Asia	PUBGM Central Asia Play-in	PUBGM Central Asia Play-in 2025 Runner-up	(Russia) Dagestan77
Central Asia	PUBGM Central Asia Play-in	PUBGM Central Asia Play-in 2025 3rd place	(Kazakhstan) Konina Power
Central Asia	PUBGM Central Asia Play-in	PUBGM Central Asia Play-in 2025 4th place	(Mongolia) Champions Esports
Central Asia	PUBGM Uzbekistan 2025 Play-in	PUBGM Uzbekistan Play-in Group A Champion	(Uzbekistan) Upgrade Team
Central Asia	PUBGM Uzbekistan 2025 Play-in	PUBGM Uzbekistan Play-in 2025 Group B Champion	(Uzbekistan) Hellion Gaming
Central Asia	PMNC Kazakhstan	PMNC Kazakhstan 2024 Champion	(Kazakhstan) AMIX Team
Central Asia	PMNC Kazakhstan	PMNC Kazakhstan 2024 ~~Runner-up~~ 3rd place	(Kazakhstan) Fache Gaming
South Asia	Invited		(Nepal) Horaa Esports
South Asia	PMNC Bangladesh	PMNC Bangladesh Spring 2025 Champion	(Bangladesh) A1 Esports
South Asia	PMNC South Asia	PMNC South Asia Spring 2025 Champion	(Nepal) DRS Gaming
South Asia	PMNC South Asia	PMNC South Asia Spring 2025 Runner-up	(Nepal) Tribe Aeromacy
Pakistan	Invited		(Pakistan) AS i8 Esports
Pakistan	PMNC Pakistan	PMNC Pakistan Spring 2025 Champion	(Pakistan) 4Thrives Esports
Pakistan	PMNC Pakistan	PMNC Pakistan Spring 2025 Runner-up	(Pakistan) R3GICIDE
Pakistan	PMNC Pakistan	PMNC Pakistan Spring 2025 3rd place	(Pakistan) Viper Knockout

== Format ==
The PUBG Mobile Super League – Central & South Asia Spring 2025 is structured into three main phases: Calibration Stage, Survival Stage, and Finals.

The tournament begins with the Calibration Stage, taking place on June 12 and 13, 2025. In this phase, the 20 participating teams are split into five groups of four. Each group competes in a set of eight matches over the course of two days. The purpose of this round is to determine the initial rankings and seeding for the subsequent stage based on their performance.

Following Calibration, the event moves into the Survival Stage, which runs from June 14 to 18, 2025. Teams are redistributed into new groups according to their Calibration rankings. Across five days, each team plays a total of 24 matches (six matches per day). The results from this stage are critical, as teams earn Head Start Points based on their final standings, which are carried over into the Finals. At the end of this stage, the top 16 teams advance to the final round.

The tournament culminates with the Finals, held from June 20 to 22, 2025. Over the course of three days, 16 teams compete in a total of 18 matches (six matches per day).

During Day 1 and Day 2, matches follow the standard tournament format, with teams earning points based on placements and eliminations. All Head Start Points earned in the Survival Stage are carried into the Finals, giving early leaders a strategic advantage.

On Day 3, the tournament introduces the Smash Rule, which significantly alters the competitive dynamic. After Match 12 (i.e., the final match of Day 2), a Match Point threshold is established. This threshold is calculated as the total point of the 1st place team at that time plus 10 points. Any team that reaches or exceeds this threshold becomes Match Point Eligible.

From Matches 13 to 18 (Day 3), the first Match Point Eligible team to secure a WWCD (Winner Winner Chicken Dinner) will be crowned the Champion of the tournament. If no Match Point Eligible team manages to win a match by the end of Day 3, the team with the highest total points across all Finals matches will be declared the winner.

This multi-stage format not only rewards consistency and strategy but also ensures high-stakes competition leading up to the selection of the top three teams who will qualify for the PUBG Mobile World Cup 2025.

== Schedule ==
Here is the schedule of PUBG Mobile Super League CSA Spring 2025:

Round		Date	Teams
Group Stage	Round 1 - Calibration	12 June 2025	All 20 teams
Group Stage	Round 1 - Calibration	13 June 2025	All 20 teams
Group Stage	Round 2 - Survival Stage	14 June 2025	All 20 teams
Group Stage	Round 2 - Survival Stage	16 June 2025	All 20 teams
Group Stage	Round 2 - Survival Stage	16 June 2025	All 20 teams
Group Stage	Round 2 - Survival Stage	17 June 2025	All 20 teams
Group Stage	Round 2 - Survival Stage	18 June 2025	All 20 teams
Finals		20 June 2025	Top 16 teams from Round 2
Finals		21 June 2025	Top 16 teams from Round 2
Finals		22 June 2025	Top 16 teams from Round 2

== Group Stage ==
=== Round 1 - Calibration ===
==== Group Draw ====
Here is the group draw of the Round 1 (Calibration) of the Group Stage of PUBG Mobile Super League CSA Spring 2025:

Group A	Group B	Group C	Group D	Group E
Team Spirit	Tribe Aeromacy	Upgrade Team	DRS Gaming	Viper Knockout
AS i8 Esports	4Thrives Esports	Horaa Esports	Virtus.pro	Al Qadsiah
Hellion Gaming	AMIX Team	Natus Vincere	Dagestan77	Konina Power
RGICIDE	Fache Gaming	Champions Esports	A1 Esports	Alpha Gaming

==== Standings ====
Here are the standings of the Round 1 (Calibration) of the Group Stage of PUBG Mobile Super League CSA Spring 2025:

Rank	Team	WWCD	Placement	Elims	Total points
1	(Mongolia) Alpha Gaming	1	29	41	70
2	(Kazakhstan) AMIX Team	0	23	47	70
3	(Russia) Al Qadsiah	2	28	41	69
4	(Kazakhstan) Konina Power	1	30	33	63
5	(Pakistan) 4Thrives Esports	1	24	37	61
6	(Russia) Dagestan77	0	12	48	60
7	(Pakistan) AS i8 Esports	0	16	33	49
8	(Nepal) Tribe Aeromacy	0	12	37	49
9	(Ukraine) Natus Vincere	0	13	35	48
10	(Nepal) Horaa Esports	2	24	23	47
11	(Pakistan) Viper Knockout	1	19	25	44
12	(Uzbekistan) Upgrade Team	1	12	32	44
13	(Pakistan) R3GICIDE	1	15	23	38
14	(Mongolia) Champions Esports	0	12	26	38
15	(Russia) Team Spirit	0	18	18	36
16	(Uzbekistan) Hellion Gaming	0	10	25	35
17	(Nepal) DRS Gaming	0	5	25	30
18	(Russia) Virtus.pro	0	9	19	28
19	(Kazakhstan) Fache Gaming	0	8	13	21
20	(Bangladesh) A1 Esports	0	1	16	17

=== Round 2 - Survival Stage ===
==== Group Draw ====
Here is the group draw of the Round 2 (Survival Stage) of the Group Stage PUBG Mobile Super League CSA Spring 2025:

Group A	Group B	Group C	Group D	Group E
Alpha Gaming	AMIX Team	Al Qadsiah	Konina Power	4Thrives Esports
Horaa Esports	Natus Vincere	Tribe Aeromacy	AS i8 Esports	Dagestan77
Viper Knockout	Upgrade Team	R3GICIDE	Champions Esports	Team Spirit
A1 Esports	Fache Gaming	Virtus.pro	DRS Gaming	Hellion Gaming

==== Standings ====
Here are the standings of the Round 2 (Survival Stage) of the Group Stage of PUBG Mobile Super League CSA Spring 2025:

Rank	Team	WWCD	Placement	Elims	Total points	Qualification
1	(Mongolia) Alpha Gaming	3	65	151	216	Advance to the Finals
2	(Pakistan) 4Thrives Esports	1	53	147	200	Advance to the Finals
3	(Russia) Virtus.pro	2	74	121	195	Advance to the Finals
4	(Kazakhstan) AMIX Team	3	57	126	183	Advance to the Finals
5	(Kazakhstan) Konina Power	3	68	105	173	Advance to the Finals
6	(Nepal) Horaa Esports	2	55	103	158	Advance to the Finals
7	(Nepal) DRS Gaming	2	72	80	152	Advance to the Finals
8	(Mongolia) Champions Esports	2	58	94	152	Advance to the Finals
9	(Pakistan) ASAP Esports	2	51	89	140	Advance to the Finals
10	(Russia) Al Qadsiah	2	52	87	139	Advance to the Finals
11	(Russia) Dagestan77	1	45	89	134	Advance to the Finals
12	(Russia) Team Spirit	1	45	88	133	Advance to the Finals
13	(Ukraine) Natus Vincere	1	47	76	123	Advance to the Finals
14	(Uzbekistan) Upgrade Team	0	35	85	120	Advance to the Finals
15	(Pakistan) Viper Knockout	2	47	56	103	Advance to the Finals
16	(Pakistan) R3GICIDE	0	34	68	102	Advance to the Finals
17	(Bangladesh) A1 Esports	2	29	59	88	Eliminated
18	(Uzbekistan) Hellion Gaming	0	34	54	88	Eliminated
19	(Kazakhstan) Fache Gaming	1	27	53	80	Eliminated
20	(Pakistan) AS i8 Esports	0	12	67	79	Eliminated

== Finals ==
=== Finals standings ===
Here are the standings of the Finals of PUBG Mobile Super League CSA Spring 2025:

Rank	Team	WWCD	Placement	Elims	HS Pts	Total points	Qualification
1	(Mongolia) Alpha Gaming	2	57	93	20	170	Qualified for the PUBG Mobile World Cup 2025
2	(Nepal) Horaa Esports	2	44	87	8	139	Qualified for the PUBG Mobile World Cup 2025
3	(Pakistan) 4Thrives Esports	1	40	81	16	137	Qualified for the PUBG Mobile World Cup 2025
4	(Russia) Al Qadsiah	1	43	87	6	136	
5	(Russia) Virtus.pro	3	58	61	12	131	
6	(Kazakhstan) Konina Power	0	40	80	9	129	
7	(Kazakhstan) AMIX Team	2	32	75	10	117	
8	(Russia) Team Spirit	1	37	68	4	109	
9	(Pakistan) Viper Knockout	2	43	61	1	105	
10	(Nepal) Tribe Aeromacy	1	31	60	6	97	
11	(Nepal) DRS Gaming	1	38	49	7	94	
12	(Mongolia) Champions Esports	2	32	54	7	93	
13	(Russia) Dagestan77	1	32	50	4	86	
14	(Pakistan) R3GICIDE	0	24	43	1	68	
15	(Ukraine) Natus Vincere	0	12	53	3	68	
16	(Uzbekistan) Upgrade Team	0	13	48	3	64	

== Final standings ==
$200,000 USD prize pool is divided into separate categories. Each team will earn prizemoney based on how well they did in the Group Stage (Survival Stage), Grand Finals, Showmatches and Overall WWCD counts.

Final standings and prizepool of $200,000 USD distribution are as seen as below:

Final Placement	Team name	Total Prize Pool	Qualification
Champion	(Mongolia) Alpha Gaming	$36,300	PMWC 2025
Runner-up	(Nepal) Horaa Esports	$21,350	PMWC 2025
3rd	(Pakistan) 4Thrives Esports	$18,750	PMWC 2025
4th	(Russia) Al Qadsiah	$12,250	
5th	(Russia) Virtus.Pro	$14,250	
6th	(Kazakhstan) Konina Power	$11,800	
7th	(Kazakhstan) AMIX Team	$11,250	
8th	(Russia) Team Spirit	$7,500	
9th	(Pakistan) Viper Knockout	$7,650	
10th	(Nepal) Tribe Aeromacy	$7,750	
11th	(Nepal) DRS Gaming	$8,200	
12th	(Mongolia) Champions Esports	$7,750	
13th	(Russia) Dagestan77	$7,400	
14th	(Pakistan) R3GICIDE	$5,000	
15th	(Ukraine) Natus Vincere	$5,950	
16th	(Uzbekistan) Upgrade Team	$5,100	
17th	(Bangladesh) A1 Esports	$2,000	
18th	(Uzbekistan) Hellion Gaming	$1,500	
19th	(Kazakhstan) Fache Gaming	$1,750	
20th	(Pakistan) AS i8 Esports	$1,500	

=== Base Prize Distribution ===
Here are the Base Prize Distribution of PUBG Mobile Super League CSA Spring 2025:

Group Stage Prize Distribution (Round 2 [Survival Stage] Only)
Place	Prize (in USD)
1st	$7,500
2nd	$6,000
3rd	$5,000
4th	$3,500
5th–8th	$2,500
9th–12th	$1,500
13th–16th	$750
17th–20th	$500

Finals Prize Distribution
Place	Prize (in USD)	Place	Prize (in USD)
1st	$26,000	9th	$4,250
2nd	$16,000	10th	$4,000
3rd	$11,000	11th	$3,750
4th	$8,500	12th	$3,500
5th	$7,000	13th	$3,250
6th	$6,000	14th	$3,000
7th	$5,000	15th	$2,750
8th	$4,500	16th	$2,500

Showmatch Prize Distribution (Finals)
Place	Prize (in USD)
1st	$900
2nd	$600
3rd	$500
4th	$400
5th	$350
6th	$300
7th	$250
8th	$200

Ultimate Arena TDM Prize Distribution
Place	Prize (in USD)
1st	$1,300
2nd	$900
3rd	$500
4th	$300

Special Prize
Category	Prize (in USD) (per unit)	Prize (in USD) (total)
WWCD	$250/match	$14,500
Team Participation	$1,000/team	$20,000

=== Awards ===
==== Player Awards ====
Award name	Prize (in USD)	Participant
Finals MVP	$1,000	(Mongolia) TOP (APG)
Rookie of the Season	$500	(Mongolia) ATOMIC (C1)
Most Elims in a Match	$500	(Uzbekistan) RUZEN (UPG)
Most Elims in a Day	$500	(Nepal) SKY (HORA)

==== Team Awards ====
Award name	Prize (in USD)	Participant
Most WWCD in the Season	$1,000	(Mongolia) Alpha Gaming
Most Points in a Match	$750	(Uzbekistan) Upgrade Team
Most Points in a Day	$750	(Russia) Virtus.pro
