= TEC Burmese Ghouls =

Burmese esports organisation

- Logo used since 2026
- Nickname: Papipapipu (Note: Papipapipu is one of MLBB Hero Angela's iconic voicelines and Burmese Ghouls fans gave the nickname because the team made major draft pick fails by selecting Angela in international tournaments, particularly at M5.)
- Short name: TECBG
- Founded: 2016; 10 years ago
- Based in: Yangon
- Location: Myanmar
- Divisions: Mobile Legends: Bang Bang; PUBG Mobile
- Official fan club: Ghouls
- Partners: Tecno Mobile, EVRDY, Burman Barbershop
- Parent group: Burmese Ghouls Esports

TEC Burmese Ghouls (TECBG) is a professional esports organisation based in Yangon, Myanmar. The team was founded in 2016 and has been operating ever since. The organisation is currently competing in Mobile Legends: Bang Bang and PUBG Mobile, though its MLBB team has been inactive since early 2025 after major players left due to contract expiry. The team also used to compete in Dota 2 and Arena of Valor. Burmese Ghouls also has a female division in Mobile Legends, named Burmese Ghouls Reinas.

Burmese Ghouls's achievements include its MLBB team scoring 1st runner up at the M2 World Championships and its AOV team representing Myanmar at the 30th Southeast Asian Games. The organisation has one of the biggest fan bases in the Myanmar Esports industry.

== History ==
=== 2016–2018 ===
==== Foundation and earliest achievements ====
Burmese Ghouls was founded with the name Team Accident 2 in 2016 by ICE ICE and PVNDV with the members of Kid, Ace, and Fox. Their first game contest was Huawei Nova Championship 2017. Before the contest, Kid and Fox left, and Ardam and Blank joined the team as new members and competed in the Zurich competition. They competed under the name Ghouls. Not long after, they changed their team's name to Burmese Ghouls. Burmese Ghouls was the team chosen to represent Myanmar at the MSC 2018 in Singapore, but they only advanced to the group stage. Then, the team won the Huawei Nova Championship 2018.

During MPL Myanmar Season 1, CG-0 joined as a stand-in. After competing in MPL Myanmar Season 1, Blank left the team and Ruby DD joined. The team started to operate officially under Burmese Ghouls Esports as of 2018.

=== 2019 ===
==== Achievements ====
After winning 1st runner up in MPL Myanmar Season 2, Ardam left, and Maybe joined the team. Then the team represented Myanmar at the MSC 2019 together with Team Resolution (RSO, currently known as Yangon Galacticos YG) but unplaced, and Kid returned to the team.

After winning MPL Myanmar Season 3, the team was chosen to represent Myanmmar at the $250,000 M1-World Championship in Malaysia in 2019, placing as 3rd runner ups after losing to Malaysian team TODAK in Lower Bracket Semifinal. Starting from MPL Myanmar Season 3, PVNDV became a coach and took a rest from the player life.

==== New teams ====
In April, following their continuous achievements on MLBB team, Burmese Ghouls announced that they would be expanding their Esports teams to Arena of Valor and PUBG Mobile. In September, the team also expanded to Dota 2.

=== 2020–2021 ===
During MPL Myanmar Season 4, Dee joined the team. Together with the new players, BG won the MPL Myanmar Season 4 and 5. In M2 World Championship, in Singapore. They were first runner up at the tournament. They were the first team in the Myanmar Esports industry to reach the finals of a World Championship tournament.

Right after they got back home from M2 World Championships, following the 2021 Myanmar coup d'état, Burmese Ghouls have disbanded as of July 3, 2021 with only the leader ICE ICE remaining in BG even though he will no longer play Mobile Legends: Bang Bang and other games because of a domestic boycott of Chinese games in Myanmar. Therefore, they had to shut down all their Esports teams.

=== 2021 ===
==== Refoundation ====
Although they stated to boycott the game, the team was eventually recreated under a new name "Burmese Ghouls Junior" with completely new members in 2021. The team joined in some 3rd-party tournaments, achieving minor successes.

=== 2022 ===
==== Coming back to fame ====
The team, renamed back to its original name "Burmese Ghouls", participated in MSC 2022 – Myanmar Qualifier, where they were second runner-ups. Therefore, they became well known again. At the time, the team was also performing well in other 3rd-party tournaments in Myanmar.

==== Participation in M4 World Championship – Myanmar Qualifier ====
Burmese Ghouls participated in the M4 World Championship – Myanmar Qualifier. Although they did not get to win the tournament, they performed well and got 5th–6th place.

=== 2023 ===
==== Early achievements ====
Earlier in the year, Burmese Ghouls participated in The Regional: Road to Cambodia 2023, which is a qualifier tournament to get a chance to represent Myanmar at 2023 SEA Games. But the team only managed to score 2nd runner up in the tournament. The next month, the team was direct-invited to MSC 2023 – Myanmar Qualifier, where they only got 5th–6th, unabled to qualify.

==== Qualifying as Myanmar representatives for IESF 2023 ====
In April, Burmese Ghouls was direct invited to IESF World Esports Championships 2023 – Myanmar Qualifiers. At this very tournament, Burmese Ghouls managed to win the champion title after beating Fenix Esports 3–1 in the Finals. This is the first time being the champions after 2021.

The team would later participate in IESF World Esports Championship 2023 – Southeast Asia Qualifier as Myanmar representatives.

==== Industry expansion ====
The team expanded their Esports industry by creating a PUBG Mobile team in September and creating a MLBB women's team, called "Burmese Ghouls Reinas", in December.

==== Qualification to M5 ====
Later in the year, Burmese Ghouls went undefeated in the MLBB M5 World Championship Qualifiers for Myanmar. Burmese Ghouls defeated Falcon Esports in the Lower-Bracket Finals. A rematch between Mythic Seal and Burmese Ghouls were staged in the Grand Finals. After winning Games 1 and 3, the team went 2–1 in the series, but Mythic Seal won 3–2. However, the Ghouls then won two-straight games and won the qualifying spot for Myanmar in the M5 World Championship in The Philippines. The team would return to the international stage for the first time since M2 where they finished as the runner-up behind Bren Esports.

== Tournaments ==
Burmese Ghouls MLBB men team's achievements are listed below.

=== MLBB male ===
==== MPL seasons ====
Season	Lineup	Result
MPL Myanmar Season 1	ICE ICE, Blank, PVNDV, Ardam, and Ace	Champion
MPL Myanmar Season 2	ICE ICE, Ace, Ruby DD, PVNDV, and Ardam	1st runner up
MPL Myanmar Season 3	ICE ICE, Ace, Ruby DD, Kid, and Maybe	Champion
MPL Myanmar Season 4	ICE ICE, Ace, Ruby DD, Maybe, Kid and Dee	Champion
MPL Myanmar Season 5	ICE ICE, Ace, Ruby DD, Maybe, Meow, Kid and Dee	Champion

==== Local and qualifier tournaments ====
Tournament	Lineup	Result
Zurich Mobile Legends Cup	ICE ICE, Ardam, Ace, Blank, PVNDV	Champion
MSC Qualifiers 2018	ICE ICE, Ardam, Ace, Blank, PVNDV	Champion
VIVO MLBB Cup	ICE ICE, Ardam, Ace, Blank, PVNDV	Champion
Huawei Nova Championship Season 1	ICE ICE, Ardam, Ace, Blank, PVNDV	Champion
Huawei Nova Championship Season 2	ICE ICE, Ace, Kid, Maybe, Ruby DD	Champion
MESL:Road To SEA Games Qualifier	ICE ICE, Ace, Ruby DD, Maybe, CG-0, PVNDV	4th place
Zurich MLBB Championship 2020	ICE ICE, Ace, Maybe, Kid, Ruby DD	Champion
Huawei Nova Championship Season 3	ICE ICE, Ace, Kid, Maybe, Ruby DD	Champion
Light of Dawn Pro-Invitational Tournament Season 1	Black Panda, Stitch, ControL, lynnxdaddy, Simple	4th place
Rise of Empire – Season 2	Jougan, Fayyan, Px7, Sorata, Jampii	Champion
MLBB Southeast Asia Cup 2022 – Myanmar Qualifier	Black Panda, Stitch, ControL, lynnxdaddy, Simple	3rd place
Real Cup Season 1	Black Panda, Stitch, ControL, lynnxdaddy, Simple, Fayyan	5th – 6th place
M4 World Championship: Myanmar Qualifier	Jougn, Niko, ControL, Stitch, Blink, Kuzan	5th – 6th place
Mahar Invitational Cup Season 1	Shadow, Niko, Lina, Stitch, Blink	1st runner up
ACFZ Esports Tournament	Shadow, Niko, Lina, Stitch, Blink	Champion
The Regional: Road to Cambodia 2023	Shadow, Niko, Lina, Stitch, Blink	3rd place
Real Cup Season 2	Niko, Lina, Stitch, Blink, Carbon	3rd place
MLBB Southeast Asia Cup 2023 – Myanmar Qualifier	Shadow, Niko, Lina, Stitch, Blink, Carbon, Kuzan, Zaidem, Yoe Yoe	5th – 6th place
IESF World Esports Championships 2023 – Myanmar Qualifiers	Shadow, Niko, Lina, Stitch, Blink, Carbon, Kuzan, Zaidem, Yoe Yoe	Champion
V-Championship Yangon	Shadow, Niko, Lina, Stitch, Blink	Champion
Mahar Professional Championship Season 2	Shadow, Niko, Lina, Stitch, Blink, Kuzan, Carbon	1st runner up
V-Championship Mandalay	Shadow, Niko, Lina, Stitch, Blink, Kuzan, Carbon	Champion
Youth Can Do Invitational Cup	Shadow, Niko, Lina, Stitch, Blink, Kuzan, Carbon	5th – 6th place
M5 World Championship: Myanmar Qualifier	Stitch, Lina, Blink, Carbon, Niko, Shadow	Champion
Mahar Invitational Cup Season 2	Shadow, Niko, Lina, Stitch, Blink, Carbon, Maybe	Champion
GG Gaming Festival - 2023	Shadow, Niko, Lina, Stitch, Blink, Carbon	1st runner up
Light of Dawn Pro-Invitational Tournament Season 2	Shadow, Niko, Lina, Stitch, Blink, Carbon, Maybe	3rd place
MLBB Mid Season Cup 2024 - Myanmar Qualifier	Kalay, Nico, Ackleyy, Stitch, Blink, Carbon	1st runner up
Gameverse Mission 2024 - Male	Carbon, Young S, Niko, Stitch, Blink, Kalay, Ackleyy	3rd place
M6 World Championship: Myanmar Qualifier	Shadow, Fay Yan, Niko, Stitch, Blink, Kalay, Bloodkikaka, Young S	5th – 6th place

==== International tournaments ====
Tournament	Lineup	Result
MSC 2018	ICE ICE, Ardam, Ace, PVNDV, Blank	5th – 6th place Group Stage
MSC 2019	ICE ICE, Ace, CG-0, PVNDV, Ruby DD, Ardam	9th–10th place Play-in
SEA Clash of Champions	ICE ICE, Ardam, Ace, CG-0, PVNDV	6th place
M1 World Championship	ICE ICE, PVNDV, Ace, Maybe, Kid	4th place
MPL Invitational 4 Nation Cup	ICE ICE, Ace, Kid, Maybe, Dee, RubyDD	3rd place
ONE Esports MPL Invitational 2020 (MPLI 2020)	ICE ICE, Ace, Dee, Ruby DD, Kid	3rd – 4th
M2 World Championship	Ace, Maybe, Dee, Ruby DD, Kid	1st runner up
Top Clans 2022 Winter Invitational	Jougan, Niko, ControL, Stitch, Blink, Kuzan	3rd place
IESF World Esports Championship 2023 – Southeast Asia Qualifier (as Myanmar National Team Representatives)	Shadow, Niko, Lina, Blink, Stitch, Carbon, Kuzan, Zaiden	3rd – 4th place Group Stage
M5 World Championship	Shadow, Niko, Lina, Stitch, Blinkx, Carbon	5th – 6th
Games of the Future 2024	Dlar, Saxa, Niko, Stitch, Blink	5th – 8th

== Players ==
Burmese Ghouls has two Esports teams, although its MLBB team have been inactive since the start of 2025.

=== Current rosters ===
Burmese Ghouls Mobile Legends: Bang Bang roster
Players
Coaches

Role	Handle	Name	Nationality
EXP Laner	CK	Kaung Thu Kha	Myanmar
Jungler	Daxx	Kaung Satt	Myanmar
MID Laner	Xian	Pyae Sone Aung	Myanmar
Gold Laner	Beni	Min Swan Kon	Myanmar
Roamer	Than Pouk	Than Htike Zin	Myanmar

Head coach

Nyo Chaw

Assistant coach(es)

Demon X

Legend:
- (I) Inactive
- (S) Suspended
- Substitute
- (injured) Injury / Illness

Latest roster transaction: 31 July 2026.

Burmese Ghouls PUBG Mobile roster
Players
Coaches

Handle	Name	Nationality
Exit	Aung Aung	Myanmar
Unknown	Nay Myo Khant	Myanmar
XZ	Shine Min Khant	Myanmar
Yahiko	Moe Khant Kyaw	Myanmar
Yatkha	Htoo Zin Aung	Myanmar
ICHI	Bhone Pyae Paing Paing Hein	Myanmar
West	Zaw Ye Htoo	Myanmar

Head coach

AKgTaMyo

Legend:
- (I) Inactive
- (S) Suspended
- Substitute
- (injured) Injury / Illness

Latest roster transaction: 26 Dec 2024.
