= 2026 MLBB Mid Season Cup =

Ninth edition of the MLBB mid-season tournament

2026 Mobile Legends: Bang Bang Mid Season Cup
- A scene during Selangor Red Giants vs Geekay Esports (Group B Lower Bracket Knockouts Round 1)

Tournament information
- Sport: Mobile Legends: Bang Bang
- Location: Paris, France
- Dates: 1 July–1 August 2026
- Administrators: Moonton; Esports Foundation
- Format: Double-elimination GSL (Group Stage); Single-elimination (Knockout Stage)
- Teams: 16 (main stage); 10 (wild card)
- Purse: US$3,000,000

Final positions
- Champions: Team Spirit
- 1st runner-up: Yangon Galacticos
- 2nd runner-up: ONIC Esports
- MVP: Mathaios "Kid Bomba" Chatzilakos

The 2026 Mobile Legends: Bang Bang Mid Season Cup was the ninth iteration for the multiplayer online battle arena game Mobile Legends: Bang Bang and the third edition under the name "Mid Season Cup".

The ninth iteration was the third-consecutive edition to be a part of the internationally sanctioned Esports World Cup tournament as one of its main esports titles. Moreover, it is the first edition of the tournament to be held in Europe, specifically Paris, France, as the Esports World Cup moved from Riyadh due to the war in Iran.

Defending champions Team Liquid PH failed to defend their title after an early group stage exit. In the Grand Finals, EECA's Team Spirit defeated Myanmar's Yangon Galacticos, 4-3 to win the title, becoming the first western team to do so in MLBB history. The team's EXP Laner, Mathaios "Kid Bomba" Chatzilakos, was named Finals MVP.

== Format ==
MSC 2026 featured 25 teams, an increase from 23 in the previous edition however, participating teams in the respective stages have largely remained the same – 16 teams participating in groups and 10 teams participating in the wild card, an increase from 8 in 2025.

=== Wild card stage ===
Similarly to the previous edition, the wildcard stage occurred first before the group stage. All ten wild card teams were split into two groups of five where each played a single-round robin Best-of-1 tournament. The top seeded teams from both groups advanced directly to the Wild Card Stage Decider Bracket. Meanwhile, teams seeded two would receive a bye-round in the Cross Group Gauntlet while seeds three and four would qualify for the Cross Group Gauntlet's first round. The Cross Gauntlet is a single-elimination bracket with only two teams advancing to the decider. Only one team from the Decider Bracket advances to the group stage.

If two or more teams finished with the same points, the standings are determined in accordance with the Official Rulebook's tiebreaker. The official MSC tiebreaker is as follows:

- If the ranking of the tied teams cannot be determined by ranking points, the tied teams will be ranked by head-to-head record.
- If the ranking of the tied teams cannot be determined by head-to-head record, the tied teams will be ranked by winning time (only the time of winning games)—the less time the team used, the higher ranking the team is.
- If the ranking of the tied teams cannot be determined by winning time (only the time of winning games), the tied teams will be ranked by the shortest single-game winning time, the less time the team used, the higher rank the team is.
- If the shortest single-game winning time (only the time of winning games) are still the same, then the longest single-game winning time will be compared. The less time the team used, the higher rank the team is.
- All match time data is based on the in-game results screen.

=== Group stage ===
The group stage followed thereafter. Unlike MSC 2025 where teams were subdivided into four different double-elimination GSL formats for the group stage, MSC 2026 featured two group stage double-elimination brackets. The group stage draw was conducted after the conclusion of the wild card stage with the main stipulation being that no two-teams from the same region is allowed to get drawn in the same match as the other, eliminating the possibility of a same-group elimination for a single region but rather the potential two-way elimination by a single region for both Groups A and B (e.g., Philippines has a team in Group A and Group B and both of them gets eliminated, hence a two-way elimination for a single region.) Similarly to the rulebook, the MSC tiebreaker was followed for this tournament as announced by the reporters during the first day of the livestream.

=== Knockout stage ===
The precipice of the tournament is the single-elimination knockout stage which was introduced during the 2024 edition of the tournament. All games apart from the Grand Finals are Best-of-5s while the Grand Finals was a Best-of-7. Similar to the 2025 edition, the battle-for-third also returned.

== Venue ==
Originally planned to be hosted in Riyadh, Saudi Arabia, on May 20, it was announced that the EWC will be moving its tournament for the first time since inception from Riyadh to Paris due to the "current regional situation". With this move, both MWI and MSC 2026 became the first tournament in the competitive year to be hosted in a venue outside of Asia and a major tournament sanctioned by Moonton to be hosted outside of the Asian continent. Both MWI and MSC 2026 will be hosted at the Paris Expo Porte de Versailles in Versailles, Paris, France.

Paris, France
Group Stage and Knockout Stage
Paris Expo Porte de Versailles

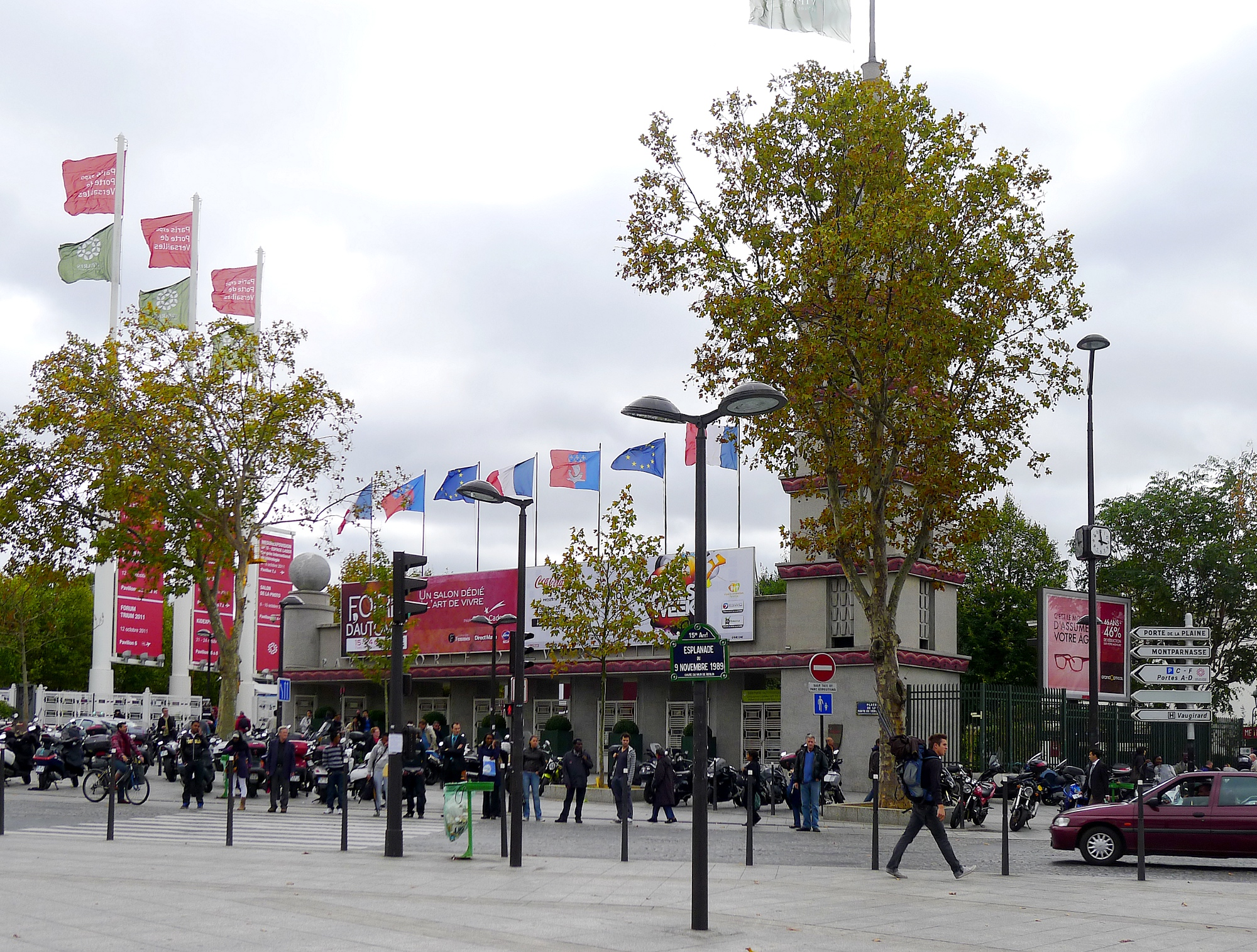

== Qualified teams ==
Fifteen teams qualified outright for the group stage with teams from the Mobile Legends: Bang Bang Professional Leagues of Indonesia, the Philippines, and Malaysia having two direct qualifiers to the group stage, and one qualifiers each – all of which are champions – from the Mobile Legends: Bang Bang Professional Leagues of Cambodia, Singapore, the Middle East and North Africa (MENA), the MTC Championship in Turkey, the Mobile Legends: Bang Bang Continental Championship (MCC) champion from the Commonwealth of Independent States or the EECA, and the inaugural tournaments of the Mobile Legends: Bang Bang Championship Tour for East Asia in Shanghai and the Americas, and the inaugural Moba Legends Masters Series in India.

Ten teams across the newly established Mobile Legends: Bang Bang Championship Tour groups will qualify for wild cards with two representatives coming from the SEA region – primarily from Thailand and Mekong – three from the EMEA region – particularly from the Middle East and North Africa (MENA), Turkey, and Europe – one from the EECA region – particularly the runner-up of the Mobile Legends: Bang Bang Continental Championship (MCC) – three from the EA region – particularly second through fourth place of the first leg of the Shanghai Tour – and the runner-up from the AMER region.

Several changes from the previous season includes the following:

- MCT East Asia will be given one main stage slot and three wild card slots, replacing the four combined slots held by national qualifiers in China, Japan, and Mongolia.
- MCT Americas will be given one main stage slot and one wild card slot, replacing the three combined slots held by the North America Challenger Tournament (NACT) and MPL Latin America. This also means that the Americas region has one less slot.
- The MLMS is given one main stage slot.
- MSL Thailand is given one wild card slot. Thai teams can still qualify via MCC Mekong as an alternate pathway.
- The MEC is given one wild card slot.
- The Vietnam MLBB Championship (VMC) no longer has a slot, but remains a qualifier for MCC Mekong, retaining the pathway for Vietnamese teams.

Legend:
Defending MSC champions	Former MSC champions	Best Finish – Knockout Stage	Best Finish – Group Stage	Best Finish – Wild Card Stage	First Time Qualifiers

MCT Region	Subregion	League	Path	Team
Starting from group stage
SEA	Indonesia	MPL ID	Season 17 champions	Team Vitality (Note: Officially known as Bigetron by Vitality, the team will compete as Team Vitality in MSC due to Esports World Cup Club Championship rules. Bigetron was bought out by the French organization in 2025.)
SEA	Indonesia	MPL ID	Season 17 runners-up	Onic Esports
SEA	Philippines	MPL PH	Season 17 champions	Team Liquid PH
SEA	Philippines	MPL PH	Season 17 runners-up	Team Falcons PH (Note: Team Falcons PH qualifies for the first time as the organization Team Falcons and not of a partnership based qualification like Falcons AP Bren in 2024. Denoting the "PH" on the suffix for the team due to its sister Team qualifying in another bracket.)
SEA	Malaysia	MPL MY	Season 17 champions	Selangor Red Giants
SEA	Malaysia	MPL MY	Season 17 runners-up	Team Vamos
SEA	Singapore	MPL SG	Season 11 champions	IGNITE Gaming
SEA	Cambodia	MPL KH	Season 10 champions	PRO Esports
SEA	Myanmar	MSL MM	Season 3 champions	Yangon Galacticos
EMEA	MENA	MPL MENA	Season 9 champions	Geekay Esports
EMEA	Turkey	MTC	Season 7 champions	Aurora Gaming (Note: Aurora Turkiyë will compete as Aurora Gaming because they are the only team under the Aurora brand to qualify for the tournament.)
EECA	CIS (Note: Moonton uses the term "Eastern Europe and Central Asia" in place of "Commonwealth of Independent States" when referring to the region as a whole.)	MCC	Season 7 champions	Team Spirit
EA	East Asia	MCT EA	Season 1 champions	Guangzhou Gaming
AMER	Americas	MCT AMER	Season 1 champions	Entity7
NR	India	MLMS	Season 1 champions	True Rippers
Starting from wild card stage
SEA	Thailand	MSL-TH	Season 1 champions	King of Gamers Club
SEA	Southeast Asia	MCCM	Season 7 champions	Niightmare Esports (Note: Niightmare Esports qualified for MSC 2021 but lost in the play-in tournament. For technicality purposes and the implementation of stages for this tournament, this team's best performance is part of the group stage as Wild Card Stage play-ins were not implemented during this time.)
EMEA	MENA	MPL MENA	Season 9 runners-up	Team Falcons
EMEA	Turkey	MTC	Season 7 runners-up	FUT Esports
EMEA	Europe	MEC	Season 2 champions	VSG
EECA	CIS	MCC	Season 7 runners-up	~~Verso Time~~ (Note: Verso Time withdrew prior to the start of the tournament as they failed to secure visas. All teams in their Wildcard group had their games against Verso Time converted into forfeit wins.)
EA	East Asia	MCT EA	Season 1 runners-up	The MongolZ
EA	East Asia	MCT EA	Season 1 third place	The Huns Esports
EA	East Asia	MCT EA	Season 1 fourth place	Sunset Ravens
AMER	Americas	MCT AMER	Season 1 runners-up	Alpha7 North

== Rosters ==
Notable in this edition was all five-past finals MVPs have qualified to the tournament which includes Grant Duane "Kelra" Pillas (2021), Eman "EMANN" Sangco (2022), Nicky "Kiboy" Pontonuwu (2023), Muhammad "Sekys" Zaman (2024), and reigning finals MVP Sanford "Sanford" Vinuya (2025).

Legend:
†	Team Captain	Defending Finals MVP	Former Finals MVP

Team	Coaching Staff		Tournament Roster					
Team	Manager	Coach	Exp Lane	Jungle	Mid Lane	Gold Lane	Roamer	Substitute
Team Vitality (Note: Team Vitality also has their assistant coach "Kdot" as an Assistant coach.)	––	~~Theodorus "Theonael" Valendra Natanael"~~ (Note: On July 19, 2026, Bigetron by Vitality announced that Theonael will not be coaching and accompanying the team for MSC due to health reasons. It is still unclear who will replace him.)	Dylont Ananda "Shogun" Setya Huraihira	Manuel "Nnael" Simbolon	Marcel Juan "Moreno" Moreno Sinulingga (†)	Eman Llanda "EMANN" Sangco (Note: MSC 2022 Finals MVP for RSG Philippines)	Muhammad Arifin "Finn" Hikmatullah	Muhd Rafi "Ryzaa" Mauriza
ONIC Esports	Calvin "CW" Winata	Paul Denver "Coach Yeb" Miranda	Motchi Lutfi "Lutpi" Adrianto	Kairi "Kairi" Rayosdelsol	Gilang "S A N Z"	Grant Duane "Kelra" Pillas (Note: MSC 2021 Finals MVP for Execration)	Nicky Fernando "Kiboy" Pontonuwu (Note: MSC 2023 Finals MVP for ONIC Esports) (†)	Sam Salomo "Ssamuel" Hosyo
Team Liquid	Mitch "Mitch" Liwanag	Ong "Coach Aeon" Wei Sheng	Sanford Marin "Sanford" Vinuya (‡)	Karl Gabriel "KarlTzy" Nepomuceno	Alston "Sanji" Pabico (†)	Dave "Teddy" Viaña	Jaypee "Jaypee" dela Cruz	Kim "Daiki" Sebanes
Team Falcons PH	Aila Denise "Adi" Padilla	Mohammad"Moody" Samal	David "Flap" Canon	Michael Angelo"Kyle" Sayson	Salic Alauya "Hadji" Imam	Marco Stephen "Super Marco" Requitiano	Rowgien Stimpson "Owgwen" Unigo (†)	Edferdz "Ferdz" Fernandez
Selangor Red Giants	Pook Kok "OzoraVeki" Sing (Note: Official role is "Other" in the announcement.)	Michael Angelo "Coach Arcadia" Bocabo	Mark Rusiana "Kramm" Genzon (†)	Muhammad Haqqullah "Sekys" Zaman (Note: MSC 2024 Finals MVP for Selangor Red Giants)	Hazziq Danish "Stormie" Bin Mohamad Rizwan	John Vincent "Innocent" Banal	Muhammad Qayyum "Yums" Suhairi	Muhammad Danish "Unii" Fitri Bin Razman
Team Vamos	––	Afrindo "G" Valentino	Muhammad "Sepat" Irfan bin Aujang	Danish Tahqif "Error 404" Bin Abdullah	Adriansyah "Clawkun" Baihaqi Lesmana	Nicodemus "Natco" Dustin Koesnadi	Muhammad Aqif "Zqeef" Haiqal Bin Azman	Muhammad Harith "Zeno" Bin Jefry
PRO Esports	SamZ	Chhim "CatGod" Vitou	Leng "SryimFelix" Kimhak	Kyle Shawn "Koyly" Reyes	Seng "Saa" Rosa	Salvick Guiyah "Kouzen" Tolarba	Mey "PPPPP" Sambatpanha	Douglas "ImbaDeejay" Astibe II
Yangon Galacticos	Joku	Mark Neil "Marvz" Luz	Hein Htet "Ying" Oo	Han Htoo "Hann" Swe	Myo Myint Ko "Kaize" Ko Kyaw	Shine Lin "Sanjiiii" Aung	Kyaw "Blink" Thuya	Min Htun "M God" Aung
IGNITE Gaming (Note: The team also has an analyst named "Cryptic")	––	Ronnel Jayson "Ransei" Calinawan	Yeo Wee "Diablo" Lun	Kelvin "Kelvin" Chen	Royven "Roy" Tan	Chester Yong "CS" Seng You	Jay Chung "Jay" Jun Wen	Drinn
Geekay Esports	Ihab "MarashallNemesis" Tarrafati	Mohamed Saeed "Ghostarica" Attia	Enkhbat "Aizn" Munkhharaa	Anand "Xeno" Baatarkhuu	Omar Sami "Quanok" Ali	Yazan "Yaga" Alsawaris	Mohamed "Shen" Elshanawany	Gamba
Team Spirit	Inverno	Nikita "Coldstar" Morozov"	Mathaios "Kid Bomba" Panagiotis Chatzilakos	Zaur "zaur egoist" Magomadov	Kemiran "Sunset Lover" Kochkarov (†)	Anton "Hiko" Igorevich Pak	Stanislav "SAWO" Reshniak	Ekaterina "Euphoria" Ustinova
Aurora Gaming	Eric Khor "ReiNNNN" Wei Soon	Neil "Midnight" de Guzman	Mehmet Ibrahim "Lunar" Ilgun	Sidar "Tienzy" Menteşe	Ahmet "Rosa" Taha Batır	Şiyar "Sigibum" Akbulut	Lukasz "PAGU" Bigus	Furkan "APEX47" Akbulut
Guangzhou Gaming	––	Lu "sundae" Wenhao	Li "Modi" Gaorong	Peng "ReCall" Kuohai	Xu "xYing" Weile	Cymond "Cy" Torres	Zhou "Meii" Ri	Wang Calvin "Wolf" Jacob
Entity7	Adolfo "Adolfo" Cellerico	Criss "CRISSANGEL" Angel	Ericber	Facundo "Hideonbush" Ledesma	Johan Andruy "Shin" Gonzalez	Cesar Daniel "Doom" Aldave Hernandez	Victor "Vanguin" Sousa	––
True Rippers	Aayush "Aayu" Singh	Rei "Coach Zen" Gayapanao	Rehan "Rehansyah" Irwansyah	Ryan "IYanZz" Tarigan	Abhijeet "ASUNA" Katkar	Gaithanlung "Garcia" Gonmei	Susanta "Kimmy" Biswas	Dhubalanta "Duba" Oinam
The MongolZ	Unurbat "Summer" Munkhbat	To be determined (Note: Initially, Rodel "Ar Sy" Cruz was named coach for the team. However, on June 27, 2026, the team announced that it will not associate itself with Cruz due to a breach of contract agreement.)	Ermuunbaatar "mumu" Tumurbaatar	Bagabandi "Zxaura" Tegshjargal	Lkhagvasuren "Mayki" Otgonbayar	Erdenebileg "Kei" Erdensuren	Tengis "Aux" Bayarsaikhan	Munkh Erdene "Dino" Sukhbaatar
The Huns Esports	Saikhanbileg "Bright" Oyunbumchin	Beku	Erkhembayar "Bankai" Batkhuu	stillmeta	Zolboo "Kenni" Tsogtbaatar	Yuki	Oyu	Miwaxn
Sunset Ravens	pipiminet	Raymond "Raizan" Tandrian	Ronixx	Mexi	Eska	Asahi "muiminet" Nakaminami	popopoon	trap
Niightmare Esports	Sathaphone "Alain"Kayavong	Coach V	Phoutthavan "Juviana" Pheungpasomxay	Mangkonethong "2Ez4Lexxy" Sinbandit	Marcelino Jr. Grijaldo "IDID" Semontina	Rasec "NoMed" Sugarno	Sengathit "J4ZBIN" Phounsavat	Khampaseuth "KHammy" Hanxana
King of Gamers Club	––	Justine "JUSTINE" Hamot Canoy	Chaiyakrit "33rd" Buangern	Ken Louie "Kzen" Bermudes Pile	Piyanat "Zed" Songsermpanit	John Ryan "Payen" Bernacer	Pongpanata "Hwiko" Ruengareerat	Last Hope
FUT Esports	ASG	Yosua "Tezet" Sanger	Egemen "Eksi" Onem	Mehmed Akif "Kazue" Ozturk	Mustafa Ege "Saiki" Akin	Necdet Efe "Rx" Arslan	Gorkem "Blotzfet" Altin	RAGNAR
Team Falcons	Amr Wafed "Kakashi" Yassein Hafez Elsayed	Paolo "Paoweeburn"Lobaton	Ayman Othman "Sanji" Bin Muidh Alqarni	Bien "Boyet" Chumecera	Muath Saad "Cuffin" S Alkoraini	Sulaiman Musallam "Saano" S Alrashdi	Moayed Ayman "Trolll" M Kharaba	Mohammed Ayman "Tarzan" M Kharabah
Victory Song Gamers (VSG)	Sakura	Jeffrey "Coach Jeff" Orquila Manforte	Jhon Marl "JM" Sebastain	Mark Venedict "MarkTzy" Pagaduan	Oleg "Dikson" Pakhomov	Carl Vincent "Carvi" Tinio	Meikel "boro" Busch	Alexander "Smetanduck" Lukovnikov
Alpha7 North	Anthony "G the aiko" Hodge	Martin "Sir rose" Bautista	Nathanael Sumpay "NATHZZ" Estrologo	Carlos Ortega "bestplayer1" Vega	Chris "COLEWORLD" Cartagenas	Ziameth-Jei "Zia" Caluya	Vo Thanh "Shark" Trung	Pavel

== Wild Card Stage ==
The Wild Card Stage for the 2026 MLBB Mid Season Cup will last from July 1st to July 4th in Paris, France. All teams were split into two groups of five and all matches will be played in a Best-of-3 setting. The first seed from both groups automatically qualifies for the decider stage while seeds two through four will play in the wildcard stage gauntlet while both 5-seeds from the groups are eliminated from the competition.

=== Group A ===
Pos	Team	Pld	W	L	GD	Qualification	FUT	A7N	MON	KGC	VSG
1	FUT Esports (Q)	4	3	1	+2	Decider Qualified	—	0–1	1–0	1–0	1–0
2	Alpha7 North (Q)	4	3	1	+2	Gauntlet Qualified	1–0	—	0–1	1–0	1–0
3	The MongolZ (Q)	4	3	1	+2	Gauntlet Qualified	0–1	1–0	—	1–0	1–0
4	King of Gamers Club (Q)	4	1	3	-2	Gauntlet Qualified	0–1	0–1	0–1	—	1–0
5	Victory Songs Gamers (E)	4	0	4	-4		0–1	0–1	0–1	0–1	—

Updated to match(es) played on July 2, 2026. Source:
(E) Eliminated; (Q) Qualified to the phase indicated

=== Group B ===
Pos	Team	Pld	W	L	GD	Qualification	HUNS	FLCM	SnR	NII	VSG
1	The Huns Esports (Q)	4	4	0	+3	Decider Qualified	—	1–0	1–0	1–0	W
2	Team Falcons (Q)	4	3	1	+1	Gauntlet Qualified	0–1	—	1–0	1–0	W
3	Sunset Ravens (Q)	4	2	2	-1	Gauntlet Qualified	0–1	0–1	—	1–0	W
4	Niightmare Esports (Q)	4	1	3	-3	Gauntlet Qualified	0–1	0–1	0–1	—	W
5	Verso Time (E)	4	0	4	0	Forfeited	FF	FF	FF	FF	—

Updated to match(es) played on July 2, 2026. Source:
(E) Eliminated; (Q) Qualified to the phase indicated

=== Match Results ===
Match 1	July 1	The MongolZ	0	–	1	FUT Esports	Paris, France
	17:00 (PHT)	FUT Esports wins the series, 1-0					Paris Expo Porte de Versailles
		Gold: 41.9k Turtle(s): 1 Lord(s): 0 Turret(s): 2 Total Kills: 5	Game Time: 15:08; Map: Dangerous Grass			Gold: 50.4k Turtle(s): 2 Lord(s): 2 Turret(s): 9 Total Kills: 17	

Match 2	July 1	The Huns Esports	1	–	0	Sunset Ravens	Paris, France
	17:45 (PHT)	The Huns Esports wins the series, 1-0					Paris Expo Porte de Versailles
		Gold: 32.9k Turtle(s): 2 Lord(s): 0 Turret(s): 5 Total Kills: 11	Game Time: 9:41; Map: Expanding Rivers			Gold: 24.3k Turtle(s): 1 Lord(s): 0 Turret(s): 0 Total Kills: 4	

Match 3	July 1	King of Gamers Club	1	–	0	Victory Song Gamers	Paris, France
	18:30 (PHT)	King of Gamers Club wins the series, 1-0					Paris Expo Porte de Versailles
		Gold: 49.8k Turtle(s): 1 Lord(s): 2 Turret(s): 9 Total Kills: 13	Game Time: 15:24; Map: Expanding Rivers			Gold: 41.7k Turtle(s): 2 Lord(s): 0 Turret(s): 2 Total Kills: 2	

Match 4	July 1	Sunset Ravens	0	–	1	Team Falcons	Paris, France
	19:15 (PHT)	Team Falcons wins the series, 1-0					Paris Expo Porte de Versailles
		Gold: 37.5k Turtle(s): 0 Lord(s): 0 Turret(s): 1 Total Kills: 5	Game Time: 14:08; Map: Flying Clouds			Gold: 48.3k Turtle(s): 3 Lord(s): 2 Turret(s): 8 Total Kills: 25	

Match 5	July 1	The MongolZ	1	–	0	Victory Song Gamers	Paris, France
	20:00 (PHT)	The MongolZ wins the series, 1-0					Paris Expo Porte de Versailles
		Gold: 78.5k Turtle(s): 1 Lord(s): 2 Turret(s): 9 Total Kills: 23	Game Time: 23:57; Map: Dangerous Grass			Gold: 73.7k Turtle(s): 2 Lord(s): 1 Turret(s): 6 Total Kills: 24	

Match 6	July 1	The Huns Esports	1	–	0	Team Falcons	Paris, France
	20:45(PHT)	The Huns Esports wins the series, 1-0					Paris Expo Porte de Versailles
		Gold: 70.9k Turtle(s): 1 Lord(s): 1 Turret(s): 7 Total Kills: 16	Game Time: 21:28; Map: Broken Walls			Gold: 66.2k Turtle(s): 9 Lord(s): 3 Turret(s): 2 Total Kills: 23	

Match 7	July 1	The MongolZ	1	–	0	King of Gamers Club	Paris, France
	21:30(PHT)	The MongolZ wins the series, 1-0					Paris Expo Porte de Versailles
		Gold: 39.6k Turtle(s): 3 Lord(s): 0 Turret(s): 7 Total Kills: 16	Game Time: 10:58; Map: Dangerous Grass			Gold: 29.8k Turtle(s): 0 Lord(s): 0 Turret(s): 0 Total Kills: 5	

Match 8	July 1	FUT Esports	1	–	0	Victory Song Gamers	Paris, France
	22:15(PHT)	FUT Esports wins the series, 1-0					Paris Expo Porte de Versailles
		Gold: 39.1k Turtle(s): 3 Lord(s): 1 Turret(s): 9 Total Kills: 6	Game Time: 11:53; Map: Broken Walls			Gold: 31.4k Turtle(s): 0 Lord(s): 0 Turret(s): 1 Total Kills: 1	

Match 9	July 2	The MongolZ	1	–	0	Alpha7 North	Paris, France
	17:00 (PHT)	The MongolZ wins the series, 1-0					Paris Expo Porte de Versailles
		Gold: 43.3k Turtle(s): 3 Lord(s): 1 Turret(s): 8 Total Kills: 21	Game Time: 11:44; Map: Flying Clouds			Gold: 30.6k Turtle(s): 0 Lord(s): 0 Turret(s): 0 Total Kills: 6	

Match 10	July 2	Sunset Ravens	1	–	0	Niightmare Esports	Paris, France
	17:45 (PHT)	Sunset Ravens wins the series, 1-0					Paris Expo Porte de Versailles
		Gold: 60.7k Turtle(s): 2 Lord(s): 2 Turret(s): 9 Total Kills: 14	Game Time: 20:47; Map: Flying Clouds			Gold: 57.0k Turtle(s): 0 Lord(s): 1 Turret(s): 3 Total Kills: 7	

Match 11	July 2	King of Gamers Club	0	–	1	Alpha7 North	Paris, France
	18:30 (PHT)	Alpha7 North wins the series, 1-0					Paris Expo Porte de Versailles
		Gold: 59.8k Turtle(s): 1 Lord(s): 1 Turret(s): 4 Total Kills: 13	Game Time: 19:36; Map: Dangerous Grass			Gold: 63.6k Turtle(s): 2 Lord(s): 2 Turret(s): 9 Total Kills: 20	

Match 12	July 2	The Huns Esports	1	–	0	Niightmare Esports	Paris, France
	19:15 (PHT)	The Huns Esports wins the series, 1-0					Paris Expo Porte de Versailles
		Gold: 55.4k Turtle(s): 1 Lord(s): 0 Turret(s): 5 Total Kills: 13	Game Time: 18:13; Map: Dangerous Grass			Gold: 53.8k Turtle(s): 2 Lord(s): 2 Turret(s): 7 Total Kills: 14	

Match 13	July 2	Alpha7 North	1	–	0	FUT Esports	Paris, France
	20:00 (PHT)	Alpha7 North wins the series, 1-0					Paris Expo Porte de Versailles
		Gold: 54.1k Turtle(s): 1 Lord(s): 1 Turret(s): 8 Total Kills: 23	Game Time: 17:01; Map: Expanding Rivers			Gold: 48.1k Turtle(s): 2 Lord(s): 1 Turret(s): 4 Total Kills: 4	

Match 14	July 2	Niightmare Esports	0	–	1	Team Falcons	Paris, France
	20:45(PHT)	Team Falcons wins the series, 1-0					Paris Expo Porte de Versailles
		Gold: 33.7K; Turtle(s): 3 Lord(s): 0 Turret(s): 7 Total Kills: 10	Game Time: 09:59; Map: Flying Clouds			Gold: 24.8k Turtle(s): 0 Lord(s): 0 Turret(s): 2 Total Kills: 2	

Match 15	July 2	Alpha7 North	1	–	0	Victory Song Gamers	Paris, France
	21:30(PHT)	Alpha7 North wins the series, 1-0					Paris Expo Porte de Versailles
		Gold: 39.6k Turtle(s): 3 Lord(s): 0 Turret(s): 7 Total Kills: 16	Game Time: 10:58; Map: Dangerous Grass			Gold: 29.8k Turtle(s): 0 Lord(s): 0 Turret(s): 0 Total Kills: 5	

Match 16	July 2	FUT Esports	1	–	0	King of Gamers Club	Paris, France
	22:15(PHT)	FUT Esports wins the series, 1-0					Paris Expo Porte de Versailles
		Gold: 47.6k Turtle(s): 1 Lord(s): 1 Turret(s): 8 Total Kills: 24	Game Time: 14:07; Map: Dangerous Grass			Gold: 37.7k Turtle(s): 2 Lord(s): 0 Turret(s): 1 Total Kills: 6	

==== Gauntlet Matches ====
Gauntlet Match 1	July 3	The MongolZ	1	–	2	Niightmare Esports	Paris, France
	17:00 (PHT)	Niightmare Esports wins the series, 2-1					Paris Expo Porte de Versailles
		Gold: 40.5k Turtle(s): 0 Lord(s): 0 Turret(s): 4 Team Kills: 2	Game Time: 15:01; Broken Walls			Gold: 49.8k Turtle(s): 3 Lord(s): 2 Turret(s): 9 Team Kills: 14	
		Gold: 46.3k Turtle(s): 2 Lord(s): 1 Turret(s): 8 Team Kills: 21	Game Time: 13:23; Dangerous Grass			Gold: 37.0k Turtle(s): 1 Lord(s): 0 Turret(s): 2 Team Kills: 12	
		Gold: 74.6k Turtle(s): 0 Lord(s): 1 Turret(s): 8 Team Kills: 15	Game Time: 24:59; Flying Cloud			Gold: 78.6k Turtle(s): 3 Lord(s): 3 Turret(s): 7 Team Kills: 30	

Gauntlet Match 2	July 3	Sunset Ravens	0	–	2	King of Gamers Club	Paris, France
	18:30 (PHT)	King of Gamers Club wins the series, 2-0					Paris Expo Porte de Versailles
		Gold: 47.8k Turtle(s): 2 Lord(s): 0 Turret(s): 3 Team Kills: 11	Game Time: 17:09; Dangerous Grass			Gold: 47.7k Turtle(s): 1 Lord(s): 3 Turret(s): 5 Team Kills: 8	
		Gold: 36.2k Turtle(s): 0 Lord(s): 0 Turret(s): 2 Team Kills: 2	Game Time: 14:25; Flying Cloud			Gold: 46.9k Turtle(s): 3 Lord(s): 2 Turret(s): 9 Team Kills: 12	

Gauntlet Match 3	July 3	Team Falcons	2	–	0	Niightmare Esports	Paris, France
	19:15 (PHT)	Team Falcons wins the series, 2-0					Paris Expo Porte de Versailles
		Gold: 44.0k Turtle(s): 2 Lord(s): 1 Turret(s): 8 Team Kills: 19	Game Time: 13:13; Dangerous Grass			Gold: 37.1k Turtle(s): 1 Lord(s): 0 Turret(s): 0 Team Kills: 6	
		Gold: 54.3k Turtle(s): 1 Lord(s): 3 Turret(s): 7 Team Kills: 21	Game Time: 16:50; Broken Walls			Gold: 49.8k Turtle(s): 2 Lord(s): 0 Turret(s): 1 Team Kills: 13	

Gauntlet Match 4	July 3	Alpha7 North	2	–	1	King of Gamers Club	Paris, France
	21:30 (PHT)	Alpha7 North wins the series, 2-1					Paris Expo Porte de Versailles
		Gold: 66.8k Turtle(s): 1 Lord(s): 1 Turret(s): 9 Team Kills: 20	Game Time: 22:02; Dangerous Grass			Gold: 63.7k Turtle(s): 2 Lord(s): 2 Turret(s): 6 Team Kills: 8	
		Gold: 51.8k Turtle(s): 3 Lord(s): 0 Turret(s): 3 Team Kills: 8	Game Time: 18:12; Broken Walls			Gold: 55.2k Turtle(s): 0 Lord(s): 3 Turret(s): 7 Team Kills: 12	
		Gold: 40.4k Turtle(s): 3 Lord(s): 1 Turret(s): 8 Team Kills: 19	Game Time: 11:37; Expanding Rivers			Gold: 29.5k Turtle(s): 0 Lord(s): 0 Turret(s): 1 Team Kills: 4	

=== Wild Card Playoffs ===
==== Wild Card Gauntlet ====
Round One (Best of 3)
Match 2, July 3, 2026 (18:30, PHT)
A4	King of Gamers Club	2
B3	Sunset Ravens	0
Match 1, July 3, 2026 (17:00, PHT)
A3	The MongolZ	1
B4	Niightmare Esports	2

Round Two (Best of 3)
Match 4, July 3, 2026 (21:30, PHT)
A2	Alpha7 North	2
A4	King of Gamers Club	1
Match 3, July 3, 2026 (20:00, PHT)
B2	Team Falcons	2
B4	Niightmare Esports	0

Qualified
A2	Alpha7 North
B2	Team Falcons

==== Wild Card Decider Stage ====
Semifinals (Best of 3)
Match 5, July 4, 2026 (17:00, PHT)
B1	The Huns Esports	2
A2	Alpha7 North	1
Match 6, July 4, 2026 (18:30, PHT)
A1	FUT Esports	1
B2	Team Falcons	2

Grand Finals (Best of 3)
Match 7, July 4, 2026 (20:00, PHT)
B1	The Huns Esports	1
B2	Team Falcons	2

Qualified
B2	Team Falcons

== Group Stage ==
The group stage for MSC 2026 is held from July 22 to July 26, 2026 at the Lenovo Legion Gauntlet Arena. With the conclusion of the wildcard stage, the group draws for both MWI and MSC were done after the tournament headed by casters and hosts Mohammad "Laphel" Mohammad Kamal, Rachel Melati "Aeterna" Nalapraya, and Frederick "Mirko" Handy Loho, who did the group draw for both MWI and MSC.

A consolidated, two-group, double-elimination GSL format will be observed for MSC 2026 where two groups from the upper bracket and two groups from the lower bracket will qualify for the knockout stage. All matches will be played in a Best-of-3 setting. No teams from the same region can be grouped in the same bracket.

=== Group A ===
Upper Bracket; Semifinals (Best-of-3)
Team Vitality	2
True Rippers	0
Team Falcons PH	2
Guangzhou Gaming	0
Team Vamos	2
Team Falcons MENA	0
Team Spirit	2
IGNITE Gaming	0
Lower Bracket; Knockouts Round 1 (Best-of-3)
True Rippers	0
Guangzhou Gaming	2
Team Falcons MENA	2
IGNITE Gaming	1

Upper Bracket; Finals (Best-of-3)
Team Vitality	2
Team Falcons PH	0
Team Vamos	2
Team Spirit	0
Lower Bracket; Knockouts Round 2 (Best-of-3)
Team Spirit	2
Guangzhou Gaming	1
Team Falcons PH	2
Team Falcons MENA	0

Qualified
Team Vitality
Team Vamos
Qualified
Team Spirit
Team Falcons PH

=== Group B ===
Upper Bracket; Semifinals (Best-of-3)
Yangon Galacticos	2
Geekay Esports	0
Selangor Red Giants	1
PRO Esports	2
ONIC	2
Entity7	0
Team Liquid	0
Aurora Gaming	2
Lower Bracket; Knockouts Round 1 (Best-of-3)
Geekay Esports	1
Selangor Red Giants	2
Entity7	2
Team Liquid PH	0

Upper Bracket; Finals (Best-of-3)
Yangon Galacticos	2
PRO Esports	0
ONIC	1
Aurora Gaming	2
Lower Bracket; Knockouts Round 2 (Best-of-3)
ONIC	2
Selangor Red Giants	0
PRO Esports	2
Entity7	0

Qualified
Yangon Galacticos
Aurora Gaming
Qualified
ONIC
PRO Esports

=== Matches ===
Match 1 - Group A	July 22	Team Vamos	2	–	0	Team Falcons MENA	Paris, France
	17:00 (PHT)	Team Vamos advances, 2-0					Paris Expo Porte de Versailles
		Gold: 48.7k Turtle(s): 2 Lord(s): 2 Turret(s): 8 Total Kills: 18	Game Time: 14:27; Map: Broken Walls			Gold: 41.8k Turtle(s): 1 Lord(s): 0 Turret(s): 1 Total Kills: 11	
		Gold: 52.7k Turtle(s): 2 Lord(s): 2 Turret(s): 8 Total Kills: 17	Game Time: 15:25; Map: Broken Walls			Gold: 47.2k Turtle(s): 1 Lord(s): 0 Turret(s): 4 Total Kills: 15	

Match 2 - Group A	July 22	Team Falcons PH	2	–	0	Guangzhou Gaming	Paris, France
	18:30 (PHT)	Team Falcons PH advances, 2-0					Paris Expo Porte de Versailles
		Gold: 54.1k Turtle(s): 1 Lord(s): 2 Turret(s): 8 Total Kills: 17	Game Time: 15:24; Map: Expanding Rivers			Gold: 43.5k Turtle(s): 2 Lord(s): 0 Turret(s): 1 Total Kills: 11	
		Gold: 54.5k Turtle(s): 0 Lord(s): 2 Turret(s): 7 Total Kills: 18	Game Time: 15:52; Map: Dangerous Grass			Gold: 42.1k Turtle(s): 3 Lord(s): 0 Turret(s): 1 Total Kills: 6	

Match 3 - Group A	July 22	Team Vitality	2	–	0	True Rippers	Paris, France
	19:15 (PHT)	Team Vitality advances, 2-0					Paris Expo Porte de Versailles
		Gold: 36.6K; Turtle(s): 2 Lord(s): 1 Turret(s): 7 Total Kills: 18	Game Time: 09:50; Map: Flying Cloud			Gold: 26.2k Turtle(s): 0 Lord(s): 0 Turret(s): 1 Total Kills: 4	
		Gold: 72.2k Turtle(s): 1 Lord(s): 4 Turret(s): 7 Total Kills: 26	Game Time: 21:58; Map: Dangerous Grass			Gold: 68.5k Turtle(s): 2 Lord(s): 0 Turret(s): 6 Total Kills: 20	

Match 4 - Group A	July 22	Team Spirit	2	–	0	IGNITE Gaming	Paris, France
	20:00 (PHT)	Team Spirit advances, 2-0					Paris Expo Porte de Versailles
		Gold: 48.0k Turtle(s): 2 Lord(s): 2 Turret(s): 9 Total Kills: 10	Game Time: 13:13; Map: Flying Cloud			Gold: 33.8k Turtle(s): 0 Lord(s): 0 Turret(s): 0 Total Kills: 2	
		Gold: 73.7k Turtle(s): 2 Lord(s): 3 Turret(s): 7 Total Kills: 20	Game Time: 22:42; Map: Flying Cloud			Gold: 65.9k Turtle(s): 1 Lord(s): 1 Turret(s): 4 Total Kills: 12	

Match 1 - Group B	July 23	Selangor Red Giants	1	–	2	PRO Esports	Paris, France
	17:00 (PHT)	PRO Esports advances, 2-1					Paris Expo Porte de Versailles
		Gold: 59.8k Turtle(s): 0 Lord(s): 2 Turret(s): 9 Total Kills: 17	Game Time: 18:05; Map: Expanding Rivers			Gold: 55.0k Turtle(s): 3 Lord(s): 0 Turret(s): 2 Total Kills: 13	
		Gold: 42.8k Turtle(s): 2 Lord(s): 0 Turret(s): 2 Total Kills: 9	Game Time: 14:56; Map: Dangerous Grass			Gold: 47.6k Turtle(s): 1 Lord(s): 2 Turret(s): 6 Total Kills: 17	
		Gold: 70.9k Turtle(s): 0 Lord(s): 1 Turret(s): 5 Total Kills: 14	Game Time: 22:33; Map: Flying Cloud			Gold: 72.3kk Turtle(s): 3 Lord(s): 3 Turret(s): 8 Total Kills: 24	

Match 2 - Group B	July 23	Team Liquid	0	–	2	Aurora Gaming	Paris, France
	19:30 (PHT)	Aurora Gaming advances, 2-0					Paris Expo Porte de Versailles
		Gold: 23.1k Turtle(s): 0 Lord(s): 0 Turret(s): 0 Total Kills: 1	Game Time: 09:41; Map: Flying Cloud			Gold: 34.6k Turtle(s): 3 Lord(s): 0 Turret(s): 5 Total Kills: 18	
		Gold: 39.9k Turtle(s): 0 Lord(s): 0 Turret(s): 3 Total Kills: 8	Game Time: 14:41; Map: Flying Cloud			Gold: 51.0k Turtle(s): 3 Lord(s): 2 Turret(s): 8 Total Kills: 18	

Match 3 - Group B	July 23	ONIC	2	–	0	Entity7	Paris, France
	19:15 (PHT)	ONIC advances, 2-0					Paris Expo Porte de Versailles
		Gold: 43.0k Turtle(s): 2 Lord(s): 1 Turret(s): 8 Total Kills: 22	Game Time: 11:23; Map: Expanding Rivers			Gold: 32.5k Turtle(s): 0 Lord(s): 0 Turret(s): 3 Total Kills: 6	
		Gold: 44.4k Turtle(s): 3 Lord(s): 1 Turret(s): 8 Total Kills: 15	Game Time: 11:32; Map: Broken Walls			Gold: 26.7k Turtle(s): 0 Lord(s): 0 Turret(s): 3 Total Kills: 2	

Match 4 - Group B	July 23	Yangon Galacticos	2	–	0	Geekay Esports	Paris, France
	20:00 (PHT)	Yangon Galacticos advances, 2-0					Paris Expo Porte de Versailles
		Gold: 36.4k Turtle(s): 2 Lord(s): 1 Turret(s): 7 Total Kills: 21	Game Time: 09:59; Map: Dangerous Grass			Gold: 25.0k Turtle(s): 0 Lord(s): 0 Turret(s): 1 Total Kills: 2	
		Gold: 51.5k Turtle(s): 1 Lord(s): 2 Turret(s): 7 Total Kills: 29	Game Time: 09:59; Map: Dangerous Grass			Gold: 43.6k Turtle(s): 1 Lord(s): 0 Turret(s): 3 Total Kills: 4	

Match 5 - Group A	July 24	True Rippers	0	–	2	Guangzhou Gaming	Paris, France
	17:00 (PHT)	Guangzhou Gaming advances, 2-0					Paris Expo Porte de Versailles
		Gold: 34.8k Turtle(s): 1 Lord(s): 0 Turret(s): 3 Total Kills: 6	Game Time: 12:23; Map: Flying Cloud			Gold: 42.9k Turtle(s): 2 Lord(s): 1 Turret(s): 7 Total Kills: 20	
		Gold: 51.5k Turtle(s): 2 Lord(s): 0 Turret(s): 5 Total Kills: 17	Game Time: 17:04; Map: Broken Walls			Gold: 54.1k Turtle(s): 1 Lord(s): 3 Turret(s): 8 Total Kills: 14	

Match 6 - Group A	July 24	Team Vamos	2	–	0	Team Spirit	Paris, France
	18:30 (PHT)	Team Vamos advances to Knockouts, 2-0					Paris Expo Porte de Versailles
		Gold: 46.9k Turtle(s): 3 Lord(s): 2 Turret(s): 9 Total Kills: 12	Game Time: 13:41; Map: Flying Cloud			Gold: 39.8k Turtle(s): 0 Lord(s): 0 Turret(s): 1 Total Kills: 7	
		Gold: 66.7k Turtle(s): 3 Lord(s): 2 Turret(s): 8 Total Kills: 21	Game Time: 19:24; Map: Broken Walls			Gold: 62.0k Turtle(s): 0 Lord(s): 1 Turret(s): 6 Total Kills: 13	

Match 7 - Group A	July 24	Team Vitality	2	–	0	Team Falcons PH	Paris, France
	19:15 (PHT)	Team Vitality advances to knockouts, 2-0					Paris Expo Porte de Versailles
		Gold: 61.5k Turtle(s): 1 Lord(s): 2 Turret(s): 7 Total Kills: 14	Game Time: 19:17; Map: Flying Cloud			Gold: 56.1k Turtle(s): 2 Lord(s): 1 Turret(s): 4 Total Kills: 13	
		Gold: 59.4k Turtle(s): 1 Lord(s): 1 Turret(s): 9 Total Kills: 18	Game Time: 18:21; Map: Broken Walls			Gold: 56.1k Turtle(s): 2 Lord(s): 1 Turret(s): 5 Total Kills: 11	

Match 8 - Group A	July 24	Team Falcons MENA	2	–	1	IGNITE Gaming	Paris, France
	20:00 (PHT)	Team Falcons MENA advances, 2-1					Paris Expo Porte de Versailles
		Gold: 49.0k Turtle(s): 3 Lord(s): 2 Turret(s): 8 Total Kills: 14	Game Time: 14:29; Map: Expanding Rivers			Gold: 40.2k Turtle(s): 0 Lord(s): 0 Turret(s): 2 Total Kills: 3	
		Gold: 62.1k Turtle(s): 3 Lord(s): 2 Turret(s): 8 Total Kills: 15	Game Time: 19:32; Map: Dangerous Grass			Gold: 66.9k Turtle(s): 0 Lord(s): 1 Turret(s): 9 Total Kills: 15	
		Gold: 44.0k Turtle(s): 2 Lord(s): 0 Turret(s): 6 Total Kills: 13	Game Time: 13:55; Map: Dangerous Grass			Gold: 37.1k Turtle(s): 1 Lord(s): 1 Turret(s): 0 Total Kills: 3	

Match 5 - Group B	July 25	Geekay Esports	1	–	2	Selangor Red Giants	Paris, France
	17:00 (PHT)	Selangor Red Giants advances, 2-1					Paris Expo Porte de Versailles
		Gold: 43.6k Turtle(s): 1 Lord(s): 0 Turret(s): 2 Total Kills: 11	Game Time: 14:36; Map: Expanding Rivers			Gold: 51.1k Turtle(s): 2 Lord(s): 1 Turret(s): 8 Total Kills: 19	
		Gold: 45.3k Turtle(s): 2 Lord(s): 1 Turret(s): 8 Total Kills: 15	Game Time: 12:32; Map: Dangerous Grass			Gold: 33.6k Turtle(s): 1 Lord(s): 0 Turret(s): 2 Total Kills: 5	
		Gold: 30.5k Turtle(s): 1 Lord(s): 0 Turret(s): 2 Total Kills: 4	Game Time: 10:58; Map: Expanding Rivers			Gold: 37.9k Turtle(s): 2 Lord(s): 1 Turret(s): 6 Total Kills: 12	

Match 6 - Group B	July 25	Yangon Galacticos	2	–	0	PRO Esports	Paris, France
	18:30 (PHT)	Yangon Galacticos advances to knockouts, 2-0					Paris Expo Porte de Versailles
		Gold: 93.1k Turtle(s): 2 Lord(s): 1 Turret(s): 9 Total Kills: 16	Game Time: 30:01; Map: Dangerous Grass			Gold: 87.4k Turtle(s): 0 Lord(s): 4 Turret(s): 4 Total Kills: 16	
		Gold: 42.6k Turtle(s): 2 Lord(s): 1 Turret(s): 7 Total Kills: 17	Game Time: 12:26; Map: Flying Cloud			Gold: 31.6k Turtle(s): 1 Lord(s): 0 Turret(s): 2 Total Kills: 2	

Match 7 - Group B	July 25	ONIC	1	–	2	Aurora Gaming	Paris, France
	20:00 (PHT)	Aurora Gaming advances to knockouts, 2-1					Paris Expo Porte de Versailles
		Gold: 36.5k Turtle(s): 1 Lord(s): 0 Turret(s): 1 Total Kills: 5	Game Time: 13:47; Map: Expanding Rivers			Gold: 47.2k Turtle(s): 2 Lord(s): 1 Turret(s): 9 Total Kills: 17	
		Gold: 56.5k Turtle(s): 3 Lord(s): 1 Turret(s): 9 Total Kills: 23	Game Time: 16:37; Map: Dangerous Grass			Gold: 50.9k Turtle(s): 0 Lord(s): 0 Turret(s): 2 Total Kills: 12	
		Gold: 25.3k Turtle(s): 1 Lord(s): 0 Turret(s): 2 Total Kills: 4	Game Time: 09:41; Map: Expanding Rivers			Gold: 33.2k Turtle(s): 2 Lord(s): 0 Turret(s): 6 Total Kills: 15	

Match 8 - Group B	July 25	Entity7	2	–	0	Team Liquid PH	Paris, France
	21:30 (PHT)	Entity7 advances, 2-0					Paris Expo Porte de Versailles
		Gold: 59.7k Turtle(s): 3 Lord(s): 2 Turret(s): 7 Total Kills: 21	Game Time: 19:28; Map: Dangerous Grass			Gold: 55.1k Turtle(s): 0 Lord(s): 0 Turret(s): 4 Total Kills: 10	
		Gold: 63.0k Turtle(s): 2 Lord(s): 3 Turret(s): 9 Total Kills: 13	Game Time: 19:28; Map: Flying Cloud			Gold: 55.3k Turtle(s): 1 Lord(s): 0 Turret(s): 0 Total Kills: 8	

Match 9 - Group A	July 26	Guangzhou Gaming	1	–	2	Team Spirit	Paris, France
	17:00 (PHT)	Team Spirit advances to knockouts, 2-1					Paris Expo Porte de Versailles
		Gold: 68.1k Turtle(s): 3 Lord(s): 3 Turret(s): 8 Total Kills: 11	Game Time: 21:42; Map: Broken Walls			Gold: 65.4k Turtle(s): 0 Lord(s): 1 Turret(s): 6 Total Kills: 13	
		Gold: 24.7k Turtle(s): 0 Lord(s): 0 Turret(s): 0 Total Kills: 1	Game Time: 10:26; Map: Dangerous Grass			Gold: 37.6k Turtle(s): 3 Lord(s): 1 Turret(s): 8 Total Kills: 7	
		Gold: 49.4k Turtle(s): 1 Lord(s): 0 Turret(s): 3 Total Kills: 4	Game Time: 18:22; Map: Expanding Rivers			Gold: 60.5k Turtle(s): 2 Lord(s): 3 Turret(s): 9 Total Kills: 14	

Match 9 - Group B	July 26	PRO Esports	2	–	0	Entity7	Paris, France
	18:30 (PHT)	PRO Esports advances to knockouts, 2-0					Paris Expo Porte de Versailles
		Gold: 85.7k Turtle(s): 3 Lord(s): 3 Turret(s): 9 Total Kills: 39	Game Time: 23:37; Map: Dangerous Grass			Gold: 83.5k Turtle(s): 0 Lord(s): 2 Turret(s): 8 Total Kills: 16	
		Gold: 64.3k Turtle(s): 3 Lord(s): 3 Turret(s): 9 Total Kills: 19	Game Time: 19:12; Map: Flying Cloud			Gold: 58.2k Turtle(s): 0 Lord(s): 0 Turret(s): 5 Total Kills: 10	

Match 10 - Group B	July 26	ONIC	2	–	0	Selangor Red Giants	Paris, France
	20:00 (PHT)	ONIC advances to knockouts, 2-0					Paris Expo Porte de Versailles
		Gold: 77.5k Turtle(s): 0 Lord(s): 1 Turret(s): 8 Total Kills: 16	Game Time: 23:43; Map: Expanding Rivers			Gold: 69.9k Turtle(s): 3 Lord(s): 3 Turret(s): 7 Total Kills: 20	
		Gold: 41.0k Turtle(s): 3 Lord(s): 1 Turret(s): 8 Total Kills: 12	Game Time: 11:08; Map: Flying Cloud			Gold: 28.5k Turtle(s): 0 Lord(s): 0 Turret(s): 0 Total Kills: 3	

Match 10 - Group B	July 26	Team Falcons PH	2	–	0	Team Falcons MENA	Paris, France
	21:30 (PHT)	Team Falcons PH advances to knockouts, 2-0					Paris Expo Porte de Versailles
		Gold: 60.6k Turtle(s): 2 Lord(s): 3 Turret(s): 9 Total Kills: 14	Game Time: 17:20; Map: Broken Walls			Gold: 50.7k Turtle(s): 1 Lord(s): 0 Turret(s): 3 Total Kills: 7	
		Gold: 63.0k Turtle(s): 1 Lord(s): 2 Turret(s): 9 Total Kills: 17	Game Time: 15:24; Map: Broken Walls			Gold: 55.3k Turtle(s): 2 Lord(s): 0 Turret(s): 3 Total Kills: 8	

== Knockout Stage ==
The Knockout Stage matches were determined by a draft pick by the upper-bracket qualifier teams, ranking them accordingly by the fastest gameplay done by the teams. Team Vamos was selected with the first selection order with a winning time of 1:02:57 followed by Yangon Galacticos, and Team Vitality. Aurora Gaming of Turkey was ranked fourth due to their lone 4-1 record while Vamos through Vitality, all teams had a 4-0 record.

Quarterfinals (Bo5)
Team Vamos	0
Team Spirit	3
Aurora Gaming	2
ONIC	3
Team Vitality	1
Team Falcons PH	3
Yangon Galacticos	3
PRO Esports	0

Semifinals (Bo5)
Team Spirit	3
ONIC	0
Team Falcons PH	2
Yangon Galacticos	3

Grand Finals (Bo7)
Team Spirit	4
Yangon Galacticos	3
3rd Place Match (Bo5)
ONIC	3
Team Falcons PH	0

=== Knockout matches ===
Quarterfinals Match 1	July 29	Yangon Galacticos	3	–	0	PRO Esports	Paris, France
	18:00 (PHT)	Yangon Galacticos advances to semis, 3-0					Paris Expo Porte de Versailles
		Gold: 40.4K; Turtle(s): 1 Lord(s): 1 Turret(s): 9 Total Kills: 19	Game Time: 14:27; Map: Broken Walls			Gold: 30.3K; Turtle(s): 2 Lord(s): 0 Turret(s): 1 Total Kills: 5	
		Gold: 51.8K; Turtle(s): 3 Lord(s): 2 Turret(s): 9 Total Kills: 22	Game Time: 13:58; Map: Dangerous Grass			Gold: 38.0k Turtle(s): 0 Lord(s): 0 Turret(s): 1 Total Kills: 5	
		Gold: 51.4K; Turtle(s): 1 Lord(s): 2 Turret(s): 9 Total Kills: 18	Game Time: 15:32; Map: Dangerous Grass			Gold: 43.3k Turtle(s): 2 Lord(s): 0 Turret(s): 2 Total Kills: 5	

Quarterfinals Match 2	July 29	Team Vitality	1	–	3	Team Falcons PH	Paris, France
	19:30 (PHT)	Team Falcons PH advances to semis, 3-1					Paris Expo Porte de Versailles
		Gold: 39.3k Turtle(s): 1 Lord(s): 0 Turret(s): 2 Total Kills: 6	Game Time: 14:55; Map: Dangerous Grass			Gold: 51.5k Turtle(s): 2 Lord(s): 2 Turret(s): 8 Total Kills: 18	
		Gold: 56.9k Turtle(s): 2 Lord(s): 2 Turret(s): 8 Total Kills: 15	Game Time: 16:52; Map: Expanding Rivers			Gold: 49.1k Turtle(s): 1 Lord(s): 0 Turret(s): 2 Total Kills: 9	
		Gold: 37.2k Turtle(s): 1 Lord(s): 0 Turret(s): 2 Total Kills: 8	Game Time: 13:20; Map: Expanding Rivers			Gold: 44.7k Turtle(s): 1 Lord(s): 2 Turret(s): 8 Total Kills: 14	
		Gold: 37.7k Turtle(s): 1 Lord(s): 0 Turret(s): 1 Total Kills: 5	Game Time: 13:20; Map: Expanding Rivers			Gold: 47.6k Turtle(s): 2 Lord(s): 1 Turret(s): 9 Total Kills: 13	

Quarterfinals Match 3	July 30	Team Spirit	3	–	0	Team Vamos	Paris, France
	18:00 (PHT)	Team Spirit advances to semis, 3-0					Paris Expo Porte de Versailles
		Gold: 52.9k Turtle(s): 2 Lord(s): 2 Turret(s): 9 Total Kills: 16	Game Time: 15:19; Map: Flying Cloud			Gold: 44.5k Turtle(s): 1 Lord(s): 0 Turret(s): 0 Total Kills: 8	
		Gold: 49.7k Turtle(s): 3 Lord(s): 2 Turret(s): 9 Total Kills: 17	Game Time: 13:53; Map: Broken Walls			Gold: 42.3k Turtle(s): 0 Lord(s): 0 Turret(s): 1 Total Kills: 8	
		Gold: 67.1k Turtle(s): 0 Lord(s): 2 Turret(s): 8 Total Kills: 10	Game Time: 22:13; Map: Dangerous Grass			Gold: 65.0k Turtle(s): 3 Lord(s): 1 Turret(s): 6 Total Kills: 11	

Quarterfinals Match 4	July 30	Aurora Gaming	2	–	3	ONIC	Paris, France
	19:30 (PHT)	ONIC advances to the semifinals, 3-2					Paris Expo Porte de Versailles
		Gold: 50.7k Turtle(s): 2 Lord(s): 2 Turret(s): 8 Total Kills: 13	Game Time: 14:12; Map: Broken Walls			Gold: 36.2k Turtle(s): 1 Lord(s): 0 Turret(s): 1 Total Kills: 2	
		Gold: 31.9k Turtle(s): 0 Lord(s): 0 Turret(s): 2 Total Kills: 5	Game Time: 11:31; Map: Flying Cloud			Gold: 42.5k Turtle(s): 3 Lord(s): 1 Turret(s): 9 Total Kills: 15	
		Gold: 44.2k Turtle(s): 2 Lord(s): 1 Turret(s): 7 Total Kills: 18	Game Time: 12:59; Map: Broken Walls			Gold: 35.3k Turtle(s): 1 Lord(s): 0 Turret(s): 3 Total Kills: 5	
		Gold: 59.6k Turtle(s): 0 Lord(s): 0 Turret(s): 5 Total Kills: 7	Game Time: 22:08; Map: Dangerous Grass			Gold: 69.8k Turtle(s): 3 Lord(s): 3 Turret(s): 9 Total Kills: 14	
		Gold: 49.9k Turtle(s): 1 Lord(s): 0 Turret(s): 2 Total Kills: 7	Game Time: 18:02; Map: Broken Walls			Gold: 57.2k Turtle(s): 2 Lord(s): 2 Turret(s): 9 Total Kills: 16	

Semifinals Match 1	July 31	Team Falcons PH	2	–	3	Yangon Galacticos	Paris, France
	18:00 (PHT)	Yangon Galacticos advances to finals, 3-2					Paris Expo Porte de Versailles
		Gold: 35.9k Turtle(s): 1 Lord(s): 0 Turret(s): 3 Total Kills: 3	Game Time: 13:39; Map: Dangerous Grass			Gold: 45.9k Turtle(s): 2 Lord(s): 2 Turret(s): 8 Total Kills: 17	
		Gold: 45.2k Turtle(s): 2 Lord(s): 1 Turret(s): 5 Total Kills: 4	Game Time: 15:10; Map: Flying Cloud			Gold: 48.2k Turtle(s): 1 Lord(s): 1 Turret(s): 6 Total Kills: 13	
		Gold: 49.2k Turtle(s): 3 Lord(s): 2 Turret(s): 9 Total Kills: 17	Game Time: 13:35; Map: Broken Walls			Gold: 35.3k Turtle(s): 0 Lord(s): 0 Turret(s): 2 Total Kills: 2	
		Gold: 48.3k Turtle(s): 3 Lord(s): 1 Turret(s): 8 Total Kills: 15	Game Time: 14:11; Map: Expanding Rivers			Gold: 37.2k Turtle(s): 0 Lord(s): 0 Turret(s): 1 Total Kills: 5	
		Gold: 51.0k Turtle(s): 2 Lord(s): 1 Turret(s): 5 Total Kills: 7	Game Time: 18:44; Map: Dangerous Grass			Gold: 58.2k Turtle(s): 1 Lord(s): 2 Turret(s): 7 Total Kills: 15	

Semifinals Match 2	July 31	Team Spirit	3	–	0	ONIC	Paris, France
	20:00 (PHT)	Team Spirit advances to finals, 3-0.					Paris Expo Porte de Versailles
		Gold: 57.4k Turtle(s): 2 Lord(s): 2 Turret(s): 8 Total Kills: 11	Game Time: 19:23; Map: Broken Walls			Gold: 53.2k Turtle(s): 1 Lord(s): 0 Turret(s): 3 Total Kills: 8	
		Gold: 41.4k Turtle(s): 2 Lord(s): 1 Turret(s): 9 Total Kills: 12	Game Time: 11:51; Map: Broken Walls			Gold: 31.8k Turtle(s): 1 Lord(s): 0 Turret(s): 0 Total Kills: 4	
		Gold: 47.9k Turtle(s): 3 Lord(s): 2 Turret(s): 8 Total Kills: 12	Game Time: 13:57; Map: Dangerous Grass			Gold: 37.4k Turtle(s): 0 Lord(s): 0 Turret(s): 1 Total Kills: 10	

Third Place Match	August 1	Team Falcons PH	0	–	3	ONIC	Paris, France
	16:00 (PHT)	ONIC wins the series, 3-0					Paris Expo Porte de Versailles
		Gold: 26.8k Turtle(s): 0 Lord(s): 0 Turret(s): 0 Total Kills: 1	Game Time: 11:06; Map: Flying Cloud			Gold: 41.3k Turtle(s): 3 Lord(s): 1 Turret(s): 9 Total Kills: 20	
		Gold: 24.2k Turtle(s): 0 Lord(s): 0 Turret(s): 0 Total Kills: 2	Game Time: 10:13; Map: Expanding Rivers			Gold: 35.7k Turtle(s): 3 Lord(s): 0 Turret(s): 7 Total Kills: 11	
		Gold: 54.3k Turtle(s): 1 Lord(s): 0 Turret(s): 3 Total Kills: 7	Game Time: 19:12; Map: Dangerous Grass			Gold: 61.4k Turtle(s): 2 Lord(s): 2 Turret(s): 8 Total Kills: 16	

Grand Finals	August 1	Team Spirit	4	–	3	Yangon Galacticos	Paris, France
	17:00 (PHT)	Team Spirit are your MSC 2026 champions.					Paris Expo Porte de Versailles
		Gold: 56.1k Turtle(s): 3 Lord(s): 2 Turret(s): 9 Total Kills: 13	Game Time: 13:39; Map: Dangerous Grass			Gold: 45.1k Turtle(s): 0 Lord(s): 0 Turret(s): 0 Total Kills: 5	
		Gold: 45.1k Turtle(s): 1 Lord(s): 1 Turret(s): 3 Total Kills: 2	Game Time: 16:25; Map: Expanding Rivers			Gold: 51.1k Turtle(s): 2 Lord(s): 1 Turret(s): 8 Total Kills: 16	
		Gold: 45.0k Turtle(s): 3 Lord(s): 1 Turret(s): 8 Total Kills: 15	Game Time: 12:51; Map: Expanding Rivers			Gold: 33.0k Turtle(s): 0 Lord(s): 0 Turret(s): 2 Total Kills: 1	
		Gold: 54.8k Turtle(s): 1 Lord(s): 1 Turret(s): 9 Total Kills: 14	Game Time: 15:30; Map: Expanding Rivers			Gold: 41.7k Turtle(s): 2 Lord(s): 1 Turret(s): 2 Total Kills: 5	
		Gold: 30.0k Turtle(s): 1 Lord(s): 0 Turret(s): 3 Total Kills: 2	Game Time: 11:18; Map: Broken Walls			Gold: 38.5k Turtle(s): 2 Lord(s): 1 Turret(s): 7 Total Kills: 17	
		Gold: 25.3k Turtle(s): 0 Lord(s): 0 Turret(s): 1 Total Kills: 1	Game Time: 10:10; Map: Flying Cloud			Gold: 36.8k Turtle(s): 3 Lord(s): 1 Turret(s): 6 Total Kills: 17	
		Gold: 54.8k Turtle(s): 3 Lord(s): 3 Turret(s): 8 Total Kills: 14	Game Time: 16:21; Map: Broken Walls			Gold: 44.7k Turtle(s): 0 Lord(s): 0 Turret(s): 2 Total Kills: 3	

== Final standings ==
Place	Team	Wild Card Stage		Final	Groups	Knockout Stage				Record	Win rate	Prize Pool	EWC Points
Place	Team	GRS	PLO	Final	Groups	QFN	SMF	3PM	GRF	Record	Win rate	Prize Pool	EWC Points
Champions	Team Spirit	Qualified			4-3	3-0	3-0	—N/a	4-3	14-6	.700	US$1,000,000	1,000
Runner-up	Yangon Galacticos	Qualified			4-0	3-0	3-2	—N/a	3-4	13-7	.650	US$500,000	750
3rd Place	ONIC	Qualified			5-2	3-2	0-3	3-0		11-7	.611	US$250,000	300
4th Place	Team Falcons PH	Qualified			4-2	3-1	2-3	0-3		9-9	.500	US$100,000	200
5th-8th	Aurora Gaming	Qualified			4-1	2-3				6-4	.600	US$100,000	0
5th-8th	Team Vamos	Qualified			4-0	0-3				4-3	.571	US$100,000	0
5th-8th	PRO Esports	Qualified			4-3	0-3				4-6	.400	US$100,000	0
5th-8th	Team Vitality	Qualified			4-0	1-3				5-3	.625	US$100,000	0
9th-12th	Entity7	Qualified			2-4					2-4	.333	US$65,000	0
9th-12th	Selangor Red Giants	Qualified			3-5					3-5	.375	US$65,000	0
9th-12th	Guangzhou Gaming	Qualified			3-4					3-4	.429	US$65,000	0
9th-12th	Team Falcons MENA	3-1	6-2	Q	2-5					11-8	.579	US$65,000	0
13th-16th	Team Liquid PH	Qualified			0-4					0-4	.000	US$45,000	0
13th-16th	Geekay Esports	Qualified			0-4					0-4	.000	US$45,000	0
13th-16th	IGNITE Gaming	Qualified			1-4					1-4	.200	US$45,000	0
13th-16th	True Rippers	Qualified			0-4					0-4	.000	US$45,000	0
17th	The Huns Esports	4-0	3-3							7-3	.700	US$35,000	0
18th-19th	FUT Esports	3-1	1-2							4-3	.571	US$31,500	0
18th-19th	Alpha7 North	3-1	2-2							5-3	.625	US$31,500	0
20th-21st	King of Gamers Club	1-3	3-2							4-5	.444	US$29,000	0
20th-21st	Niightmare Esports	1-3	2-3							3-6	.333	US$29,000	0
22nd-23rd	Sunset Ravens	2-2	0-2							2-4	.333	US$27,000	0
22nd-23rd	The MongolZ	3-1	1-2							4-3	.571	US$27,000	0
24th-25th	VSG	0-4								0-4	.000	US$25,000	0
24th-25th	Verso Time	Forfeited								0-0	.000	US$25,000	0
Place	Team	GRS	PLO	Final	Groups	QFN	SMF	3PM	GRF	Record	Win rate	Prize Pool	EWC Points
Place	Team	Wild Card Stage		Final	Groups	Knockout Stage				Record	Win rate	Prize Pool	EWC Points

== 2026 MLBB Women's International ==
2026 Mobile Legends: Bang Bang Women's International
Tournament information
- Sport: Mobile Legends: Bang Bang
- Location: Paris, France
- Dates: 14 July–18 July 2026
- Administrators: Moonton; Esports Foundation
- Format: Double-Elimination GSL (Group Stage); Single-Elimination (Knockout stage)
- Venue: Paris Expo Porte de Versailles
- Teams: 16
- Purse: US$500,000

Final positions
- Champions: Team Vitality (4th Title)
- 1st runner-up: Natus Vincere PH
- 2nd runner-up: Geltek Cyber Team
- MVP: Cindy Laurent "Cinny" Siswanto

The 2026 Mobile Legends: Bang Bang Women's International (stylized and referred to as MWI 2026) was the fifth iteration of the tournament formerly known as the Mobile Legends: Bang Bang Women's Invitational for the multiplayer online battle arena game Mobile Legends: Bang Bang. It is the female edition of the world championship which was held from the 14th to the 18th of July.

It was the third iteration of the tournament under the umbrella of the Esports World Cup in Paris, France. Alongside its male counterpart for MSC 2026, MWI 2026 was held first and making it the only game discipline to have two tournaments under the EWC Tournament.

Defending champions Team Vitality won their title defense, defeating 2024 MWI Champions Natus Vincere PH in six games.

== Qualification ==
Defending champions Team Vitality were invited to the tournament as the dominant team from Indonesia. The team – formerly known as Bigetron Era – had won three out of the last four iterations of the tournament with the lone exemption of MWI 2024 when Smart Omega Empress defeated them 3-0.

Otherwise, all other regions have direct qualifiers for the winners of their regional tournaments to the GSL Group Stage. A total of sixteen teams will qualify for the GSL Group Stage. As of June 10, 2026, each region has qualified one team to the tournament including: Indonesia, the Philippines, Malaysia and Singapore, Cambodia, the Middle East and Northern Africa, Eastern Europe and Central Asia, Europe-as-a-whole, Turkey, Mongolia, North America, Africa-as-a-whole, South America, Myanmar, and China. The Mekong region has yet to complete its tournament.

The following table shows the qualified teams and their respective qualification paths:

Legend:
Defending MWI champions	Former MWI champions	Best Finish – Knockout Stage	Best Finish – Group Stage	Best Finish – Wild Card Stage	First Time Qualifiers

Group	Region	League	Path	Team	Short Name
SEA	Indonesia	Battle of Gamehers	Season 2 champion	Team Vitality (Note: Team Vitality qualified already for MWI via winning the prior year's tournament, so the Battle of Gamehers spot transferred to second place.)	VIT
SEA	Indonesia	Battle of Gamehers	Season 2 runner-up	Falcons Vega	FLCN
SEA	Philippines	Athena Cup	Season 2 champion	Natus Vincere PH	NAVI (Note: Competed as Smart Omega Empress in MWI 2024.)
SEA	Malaysia Singapore	MLBB Ladies International Invitational	Season 1 champion	Team Rey Young	TRY
SEA	Cambodia	Queen Legends	Season 3 champion	Galaxy Phoenix	GPX
SEA	Southeast Asia	MWI Mekong Qualifier 2026	Qualifier's champion	Twisted Minds VN	TWIS
SEA	Myanmar	MWI Myanmar Qualifier 2026	Qualifier's champion	Falcon Daises	FALC
EMEA	Africa	MWI Africa Qualifier 2026	Qualifier's champion	Falcons Vega MENA	FLCN
EMEA	Middle East and Northern Africa	MWI MENA Qualifier 2026	Qualifier's champion	Virtus.pro MENA	VP
EECA	Eastern Europe and Central Asia	Lady MVP	Season 10 champion	Geltek Cyber Team	GCT
EECA	Europe	Valkyrie Clash	Split 1 champion	Geekay Esports FE	GEFE
EECA	Turkey	MWI Türkiye Qualifier 2026	Qualifier's champion	FUT Esports FE	FUT
EA	Mongolia	ESN National Championship	Season 1 champion	Aurora Storm	RORA
EA	China	MWI China Qualifier 2026	Qualifier's champion	SAETA	SAE
AMER	North America	MWI North America Qualifier 2026	Qualifier's champion	Gen.G Esports	GENG (Note: The roster consists of the MWI 2025 Finalists Gaimin Gladiators without Nicole "Nicholette" Huang and Jey "RYLAI" Enriquez who joined RRQ Shira.)
AMER	South America	MWI South America Qualifier 2026	Qualifier's champion	MIBR LOS (Note: Combined name of MIBR and Los Grandes due to Esports World Cup Club Championship rules as both share the same ownership; Los Grandes won the South America Qualifier.)	MIBR

== Group Stage ==
The group stage for MWI 2026 was held from July 14 to July 16, 2026 at the Lenovo Legion Gauntlet Arena.

Similarly to MSC, A consolidated, two-group, double-elimination GSL format is observed for MWI 2026 where two groups from the upper bracket and two groups from the lower bracket will qualify for the knockout stage. All matches was played in a Best-of-3 setting. No teams from the same region can be grouped in the same bracket.

=== Group A ===
Upper Bracket; Semifinals (Best-of-3)
Falcons Vega	0
SAETA	2
Team Rey Young	2
Aurora Storm	0
Geltek Cyber Team	2
Geekay Esports FE	0
Virtus.pro MENA	0
Twisted Minds VN	2
Lower Bracket; Knockouts Round 1 (Best-of-3)
Falcons Vega	2
Aurora Storm	0
Geekay Esports FE	0
Virtus.pro MENA	2

Upper Bracket; Finals (Best-of-3)
SAETA	0
Team Rey Young	2
Geltek Cyber Team	2
Twisted Minds VN	0
Lower Bracket; Knockouts Round 2 (Best-of-3)
Twisted Minds VN	0
Falcons Vega	2
SAETA	2
Virtus.pro MENA	0

Qualified
Team Rey Young
Geltek Cyber Team
Qualified
Falcons Vega
SAETA

=== Group B ===
Upper Bracket; Semifinals (Best-of-3)
Gen.G Esports	2
FUT Esports FE	0
Team Vitality	2
MIBR.LOS	0
Natus Vincere	0
Galaxy Phoenix	2
Falcon Daisies	1
Falcons Vega MENA	2
Lower Bracket; Knockouts Round 1 (Best-of-3)
FUT Esports FE	2
MIBR.LOS	0
Natus Vincere	2
Falcon Daisies	1

Upper Bracket; Finals (Best-of-3)
Gen.G Esports	0
Team Vitality	2
Galaxy Phoenix	2
Falcon Daisies	0
Lower Bracket; Knockouts Round 2 (Best-of-3)
Falcons Vega MENA	2
FUT Esports FE	0
Gen.G Esports	0
Natus Vincere	2

Qualified
Team Vitality
Galaxy Phoenix
Qualified
Team Falcons MENA
Natus Vincere

== Knockout Stage ==
The knockout stages began thereafter when the lower bracket qualifiers finished and all final 8 teams qualified to the latter. Team Vitality won the MWI 2026 title after defeating the Philippines' Natus Vincere PH 4 games to 2. This was the first time that both the former and outgoing champions faced each other in the MWI Grand Finals, and the second-time that the core members of rosters competed against each other since 2024.

Quarterfinals (Bo3)
Galaxy Phoenix	2
SAETA	1
Team Rey Young	0
Natus Vincere	2
Geltek Cyber Team	2
Falcons Vega MENA	1
Team Vitality	2
Falcons Vega	1

Semifinals (Bo5)
Galaxy Phoenix	0
Natus Vincere	3
Geltek Cyber Team	1
Team Vitality	3

Grand Finals (Bo7)
Natus Vincere	2
Team Vitality	4
Third Place Match (Bo5)
Galaxy Phoenix	0
Geltek Cyber Team	3

== Final standings ==
Team / Region	Group Stage				Knockout Stage				Prize Pool Share	Final Position	EWC Club Points
Team / Region	UBS	UBF	LBQ	LBF	QF	SF	3P	GF	Prize Pool Share	Final Position	EWC Club Points
Team Vitality	2–0	2–0	Qualified		2–0	3–1	N/A	4-2	US$150,000	Champions	1000
Natus Vincere	0–2	N/A	2–1	2–0	2–0	3–0	N/A	2-4	US$90,000	Runner Up	750
Geltek Cyber Team	2–0	2–0	Qualified		2–0	1–3	3-0	N/A	US$50,000	Third Place	500
Galaxy Phoenix	2–0	2–0	Qualified		2–0	0–3	0-3	N/A	US$30,000	Fourth Place	300
Falcons Vega	2–0	N/A	2–0	2–0	2–0	Eliminated			US$20,000	5th–8th	200
Falcons Vega MENA	2–0	2–0	N/A	2–0	2–0	Eliminated			US$20,000	5th–8th	200
Team Rey Young	2–0	2–0	Qualified		2–0	Eliminated			US$20,000	5th–8th	200
SAETA	2–0	2–0	N/A	2–0	2–0	Eliminated			US$20,000	5th–8th	200
FUT Esports FE	2–0	N/A	2–0	2–0	Eliminated				US$15,000	9th–12th	0
Gen.G Esports	2–0	2–0	N/A	2–0	Eliminated				US$15,000	9th–12th	0
Twisted Minds VN	2–0	2–0	N/A	2–0	Eliminated				US$15,000	9th–12th	0
Virtus.pro MENA	2–0	N/A	2–0	2–0	Eliminated				US$15,000	9th–12th	0
MIBR.LOS	2–0	N/A	2–0	Eliminated					US$10,000	13th–16th	0
Falcon Daisies	2–0	N/A	2–0	Eliminated					US$10,000	13th–16th	0
Aurora Storm	2–0	N/A	2–0	Eliminated					US$10,000	13th–16th	0
Geekay Esports FE	2–0	N/A	2–0	Eliminated					US$10,000	13th–16th	0

== Other Events ==
=== Visa Issues ===
On June 29, 2026, Verso Time head coach Vladimir "Ospreay" Gonchar via Telegram announced that the team was withdrawing from the MSC 2026 Wildcard stage due to persistent Visa Issues with the roster and players. Gonchar initially appealed to both Moonton and the Esports World Cup body to let Verso Time play on an online setting while their passports and visas were processed, a move supported by Moonton. However, EWC organizers denied the request and had thus resulted in the withdrawal.

According to the EWC, all matches will proceed as planned and all matches to the teams against Verso Time were wins by default, officially putting Verso Time in 25th place.

== See also ==
- 2026 Esports World Cup
- Mobile Legends: Bang Bang Mid Season Cup
- Mobile Legends: Bang Bang Women's Invitational
