= Yangon Galacticos =

Burmese esports organization

- Short name: YG
- Divisions: Mobile Legends: Bang Bang (2017–2021, 2025–present); PUBG Mobile (2019–present); Dota 2 (2019–present)
- Founded: 2017; 9 years ago
- Based in: Yangon, Myanmar
- Location: Southeast Asia
- Colors: Blue; Purple
- Partners: KBZ Pay; Lipovitan-D; KFC; V.Rohto; Grand Cherry Oo; Gusto; PowerHouse Fitness Club (PUBGM)
- Parent group: Yangon Galacticos

Yangon Galacticos (YG) is an esports organization based in Myanmar. The organization competes in professional tournaments in the esports Mobile Legends: Bang Bang, PUBG Mobile, and Dota 2.

On 3 August 2025, YG's PUBG Mobile team won the 2025 PUBG Mobile World Cup at the Esports World Cup, held in Riyadh, Saudi Arabia, becoming the first Burmese world champion in esports.

== History ==
=== Mobile Legends: Bang Bang ===
At first, the organization of Mobile Legends: Bang Bang team was founded as the team Resolution in 2017. They initially competed Mobile Legends: Bang Bang Southeast Asia Cup (MSC) 2017. They also competed in Mobile Legends: Bang Bang Professional League Myanmar (MPL Myanmar) season 1 2018 and finished as 4th place. Then, they competed in MPL Myanmar season 2 2019 and won it. They also competed in 2019 MLBB Southeast Asia Cup (MSC 2019) together with Burmese Ghouls. Then, they changed its name to "Yangon Galacticos" in MPL Myanmar season 3 2019. They finished as 4th place in MPL Myanmar season 3 and 3rd places in MPL Myanmar season 4 and 5. They competed many tournaments, but due to COVID-19 and the 2021 Myanmar coup d'état, MPL Myanmar didn't celebrate and YG's MLBB team was suspended. Later, YG's MLBB team was re-formed with new players in March 2025. On 14 March 2025, the Mobile Legends Super League season 1 was held in Myanmar by Moonton, they competed and finished in second place. On November 16, 2025, they won Mobile Legends: Bang Bang Super League Myanmar season 2 and received the opportunity to compete in the MLBB M7 World Championship. On May 31, 2026, they also won Mobile Legends: Bang Bang Super League Myanmar season 3 and received the opportunity to compete in the 2026 MLBB Mid Season Cup at 2026 Esports World Cup in Paris, France and they won the first runner-up. They also qualified as team Myanmar for the Asian Games Esports Qualifiers: Mobile Legends: Bang Bang in Singapore and received the opportunity to compete in Esports at the 2026 Asian Games in Japan and they won gold medal by defeating the Indonesian team 4-0 in the grand final on October 1, 2026. This marks the first time a Myanmar MLBB team has won a gold medal in an overseas tournament.

=== PUBG Mobile ===
YG's PUBG Mobile team founded in 2019 and first competed in PUBG Mobile Myanmar Championship 2019. They won the first prize in local and regional tournaments such as PUBG Mobile Myanmar Championship Fall 2022, PUBG Mobile National Championship Myanmar Fall 2024, PUBG Mobile Challenger's League – Southeast Asia Spring 2025, PUBG Mobile Regional Clash 2025 – Rodo Cup, PUBG Mobile Challenger's League – Southeast Asia Summer 2025. On July 25, 2025, they competed in the PMWC 2025 at EWC, held in Riyadh, Saudi Arabia. They only finished 11th in the Group Stage, so they had to compete again in the Survival Stage, finishing 8th with one point and advancing to the Grand Final Stage. In the Grand Final Stage, they showed different skills from the previous stages, winning two Winner Winner Chicken Dinner (WWCD)s on Day 1 and two more WWCDs on Day 2, and finishing with the highest points. On the final day, Day 3, a new rule was introduced, the "Smash rule", which was that the team with the most points after Day 1 and Day 2 was added to 10 points to determine the match point. The team that reached the match point would be the champion if it achieved the WWCD in the next match. On Day 3, YG reached the match point first, then Alpha Gaming reached the match point again, and Weibo Gaming also reached the match point again, but until the final match, none of the teams that reached the match point could achieve the WWCD, so YG with the most points became the Champion and the first international title of the Myanmar Esports.

The team received a hero's welcome upon arriving home at Yangon International Airport on 7 August 2025, with thousands of fans cheering them. At 4 pm that evening, they signed autographs for fans, took photos, and sang at the People's Square and Park in Yangon. A two-day celebration attended by thousands was held in Taunggyi, the capital of Shan State, with team members parading through streets with the trophy. Additionally, the KBZ Group announced that it would award the team members with nine plots of land distributed among them, valued at US$25,000 each.

On May 3, 2026, they also won SEA Regional Title, PMCL SEA 2026 Spring.

They qualified as team Myanmar for the Asian Games Esports Qualifiers: PUBG Mobile in Ho Chi Minh City, Vietnam and received the opportunity to compete in Esports at the 2026 Asian Games in Japan.

On August 31, 2026, they won PUBG Mobile Challengers League South East Asia Fall and they will compete PUBG Mobile Global Open season 2 South East Asia Finals.

=== Dota 2 ===
YG's Dota 2 team founded in 2019. They competed in over 100 tournaments, with over 40 direct invites. They first tournament was World Electronic Sports Games 2019 and achieved a fourth-place finish at the Myanmar Electronic Sports League (MESL) in 2019. They achieved first place in Asia Pacific Predator League Myanmar 2022. They achieved a first-place finish at the Master Cup SEA 2023. In 2025, they competed in the European Pro League World Series Southeast Asia and achieved third place in season 3 and second place in season 4 and even though they only finished 7th in season 5 but achieved the second place in season 6 and season 7. On August 13, they also won Lunar Snake Trophy 2. On October 28, they only achieved the second place in the European Pro League World Series Southeast Asia season 9. On February 21, 2026, they won the European Pro League World Series Southeast Asia season 12.

== Rosters ==
=== Current rosters ===
YG PUBG Mobile roster
Players
Coaches

Role	Handle	Name	Nationality
Fragger	Mernatt	Soung Wai Phyo	Myanmar
Flanker	Romeo	Khant Zaw Hein	Myanmar
Scout	Saycloud	Kaung Khant Aung	Myanmar
IGL	Smile	Swan Wint Maung	Myanmar

Head coach

Mako

Legend:
- (I) Inactive
- (S) Suspended
- Substitute
- (injured) Injury / Illness

Latest roster transaction: 26 Dec 2024.

YG Mobile Legends: Bang Bang roster
Players
Coaches

Role	Handle	Name	Nationality
EXP Laner	Ying	Hein Htet Oo	Myanmar
Jungler	Hannn	Han Htoo Swe	Myanmar
MID Laner	Kaize	Myo Myint Ko Ko Kyaw	Myanmar
Gold Laner	Sanji (on loan)	Shine Lin Aung	Myanmar
Roamer	Blink	Kyaw Thuya	Myanmar

Head coach

Marvz

Assistant coach(es)

M God, Happy

Legend:
- (I) Inactive
- (S) Suspended
- Substitute
- (injured) Injury / Illness

Latest roster transaction: 4 Mar 2026.

YG Dota 2 roster
Players
Coaches

Role	Handle	Name	Nationality
1	Ksh	Kaung Sett Hein	Myanmar
2	Young PH	Min Khant Maung	Myanmar
3	Mo Mo	Arkar Moe Myint Hein	Myanmar
4	Skill Lay	Thiha Kyaw Swar	Myanmar
5	ZawRain	Zawrain Sai Aung	Myanmar

Head coach

- Vacant

Legend:
- (I) Inactive
- (S) Suspended
- Substitute
- (injured) Injury / Illness

Latest roster transaction: 24 June 2026.
