= PUBG Mobile World Cup 2025 =

Electronic sports tournament

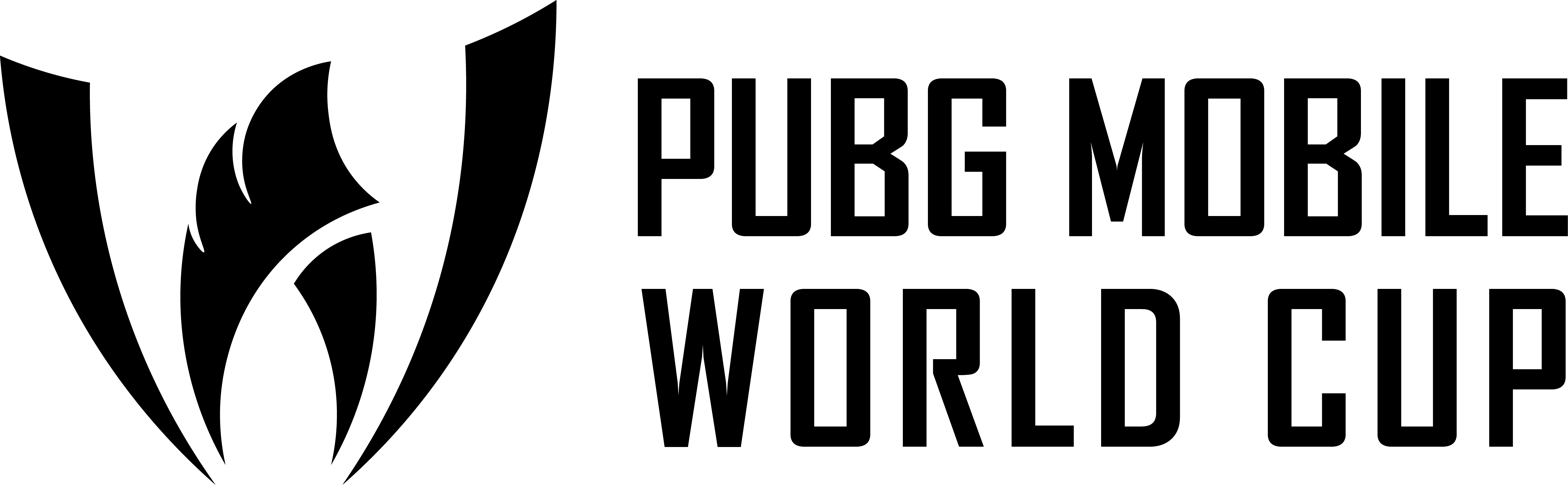

Tournament information
- Game: PUBG Mobile
- Dates: 25 July–23 August 2025
- Administrator: Level Infinite, Krafton, Esports World Cup
- Tournament format: Battle Royale
- Host(s): Riyadh, Saudi Arabia
- Participants: 24 teams
- Purse: $3,050,000
- Website: esportsworldcup.com/pmwc

Final positions
- Champion: (Myanmar) Yangon Galacticos
- 1st runner-up: (China) Weibo Gaming
- 2nd runner-up: (Mongolia) Alpha Gaming
- MVP: (Mongolia) Uuganbayar "DOK" Dulguun (Alpha Gaming)

The PUBG Mobile World Cup 2025 was the official mid-seasonal world tournament for PUBG Mobile (and its variants), organized by Level Infinite and Krafton. It was held from 5 august to 16 August 2026, as part of the 2025 Esports World Cup.

== Background ==
In October 2023, it was announced at the New Global Sport Conference that the Gamers8 esports festival, organized by the Saudi Esports Federation, would be "upgraded" to the Esports World Cup, held during the summer of 2024. In March 2024, it was announced that the PUBG Mobile mid-seasonal tournament, officially known as the PUBG Mobile World Cup (PMWC), would be included in the Esports World Cup games line-up, with the official format revealed shortly after.

The PUBG Mobile World Invitational (PMWI), which preceded the World Cup, was first held in 2021 under the Saudi Esports Federation's "Gamers Without Borders" initiative. Initially divided into East and West divisions, it was unified into a single global tournament from 2022 onward with the launch of Gamers8.

The PUBG Mobile World Cup 2025, part of the 2025 Esports World Cup, features 24 teams competing for a total prize pool of US$3,000,000. The tournament serves as the official mid-seasonal world tournament for PUBG Mobile and continues to be held in Riyadh, Saudi Arabia.

== Calendar ==
Here are the competitions dates of PUBG Mobile World Cup 2025:

●	Competitions days

July											August		
Week 3							Week 4						
21	22	23	24	25	26	27	28	29	30	31	1	2	3
				●	●	●		●	●		●	●	●

== Venue ==
PUBG Mobile World Cup 2025 was announced to be held in Riyadh, Saudi Arabia. The PUBG Mobile event was held at the BR Arena of Boulevard City, also known as the Qiddiya City Esports Arena for sponsorship purposes.

Riyadh, Saudi Arabia
Boulevard City; Qiddiya City Esports Arena
PUBG Mobile World Cup 2025 is located in Saudi Arabia

== Qualified teams ==
Region	Event	Qualification method	Team name	Group
Southeast Asia	PMSL SEA	PMSL SEA Summer 2025 Champion	(Thailand) eArena	Red
Southeast Asia	PMSL SEA	PMSL SEA Summer 2025 Runner-up	(Indonesia) Alter Ego Ares	Green
Southeast Asia	PMSL SEA	PMSL SEA Summer 2025 3rd place	(Vietnam) Team Secret	Yellow
Southeast Asia	PMCL SEA	PMCL SEA Summer 2025 Champion	(Myanmar) Yangon Galacticos	Yellow
Central Asia & South Asia	PMSL CSA	PMSL CSA Spring 2025 Champion	(Mongolia) Alpha Gaming	Green
Central Asia & South Asia	PMSL CSA	PMSL CSA Spring 2025 Runner-up	(Nepal) Horaa Esports	Red
Central Asia & South Asia	PMSL CSA	PMSL CSA Spring 2025 3rd place	(Pakistan) 4Thrives Esports	Yellow
Europe	PMSL Europe	PMSL Europe Spring 2025 Champion	(France) Team Falcons	Red
Europe	PMSL Europe	PMSL Europe Spring 2025 Runner-up	(Turkey) Fire Flux Esports	Yellow
Europe	PMSL Europe	PMSL Europe Spring 2025 3rd place	(Turkey) IDA Esports	Green
Europe	PMSL Europe	PMSL Europe Spring 2025 4th place (Note: 1 extra slot for 2025 PMGO Champion's Region)	(Turkey) Regnum Carya Esports	Yellow
Middle East and North Africa	PMNC KSA	PMNC KSA Spring 2025 Champion (Note: Host country Invite)	(Saudi Arabia) R8 Esports	Green
Middle East and North Africa	PMSL MENA	PMSL MENA Spring 2025 Champion	(Saudi Arabia) Team Vision	Yellow
Middle East and North Africa	PMSL MENA	PMSL MENA Spring 2025 Runner-up	(Saudi Arabia) POWR eSports	Red
Middle East and North Africa	PMSL MENA	PMSL MENA Spring 2025 3rd place	(Egypt) Team GAMAX	Green
Americas	PMSL Americas	PMSL Americas Spring 2025 Champion	(Brazil) INTENSE GAME	Green
Americas	PMSL Americas	PMSL Americas Spring 2025 Runner-up	(Brazil) INFLUENCE RAGE	Yellow
Americas	PMSL Americas	PMSL Americas Spring 2025 3rd place	(Brazil) Alpha7 Esports	Red
China	Peacekeeper Elite League	#1 PEL 2025 – PMWC Points	(China) Weibo Gaming	Red
China	Peacekeeper Elite League	#2 PEL 2025 – PMWC Points	(China) TT Global	Green
South Korea & Japan	PMPS Korea	PMPS 2025 S1 Champion	(South Korea) DRX	Yellow
South Korea & Japan	PMJL	PMJL S5 P1 Champion	(Japan) KINOTROPE gaming	Green
South Korea & Japan	Rivals Cup	Rivals Cup Spring 2025 Champion	(South Korea) Nongshim RedForce	Red
India	BGMI Pro Series	BGMI Pro Series 2025 Champion	(India) Team AxTMG	Red

== Format ==
Here is the format of PUBG Mobile World Cup 2025:

In the Group Stage, the three groups, consisting of eight teams each (a total of 24 teams), will compete against each other. The top 8 teams from the Group Stage will advance to the Grand Finals. The remaining 16 teams will advance to the Survival Stage. In the Survival Stage, the bottom 16 teams from Group Stage will compete against each other. The top 8 teams from the Survival Stage will advance to the Grand Finals. The top 8 teams from the Group Stage, along with the top 8 teams from the Survival Stage (a total of 16 teams), will compete in the Grand Finals.

Unlike last year, this year's PMWC Grand Finals applied the "Smash Rule": at the end of day 2, a target point would be set by adding 10 points to the score of the team at the top of the standings at that point. In order to be the champions, teams would have to reach or exceed the target point mark after a game; and then receive a Winner Winner Chicken Dinner in the games afterwards. If none of the teams achieve both conditions, the team with the most points would become the champion.

== Schedule ==
Here is the schedule of PUBG Mobile World Cup 2025:

Round	Date	Teams
Group Stage	25 July 2025	Group Red vs Yellow
Group Stage	26 July 2025	Group Green vs Yellow
Group Stage	27 July 2025	Group Red vs Green
Survival Stage	29 July 2025	Bottom 16 teams from Group Stage
Survival Stage	30 July 2025	Bottom 16 teams from Group Stage
Grand Finals	1 August 2025	Top 8 teams from Group Stage + Top 8 teams from Survival Stage
Grand Finals	2 August 2025	Top 8 teams from Group Stage + Top 8 teams from Survival Stage
Grand Finals	3 August 2025	Top 8 teams from Group Stage + Top 8 teams from Survival Stage

== Group Stage ==
=== Group Draw ===
Here is the group draw of PUBG Mobile World Cup 2025:

Group Red	Group Green	Group Yellow
Team Falcons	IDA Esports	Fire Flux Esports
Horaa Esports	Alpha Gaming	Regnum Carya Esports
eArena	Alter Ego Ares	4Thrives Espors
POWR eSports	Team GAMAX	Team Secret
Alpha7 Esports	INTENSE GAME	Team Vision
Nongshim RedForce	KINOTROPE gaming	INFLUENCE RAGE
Weibo Gaming	TT Global	DRX
Team AxTMG	R8 Esports	Yangon Galacticos

=== Group Stage standings ===
Here are the standings of the Group Stage of PUBG Mobile World Cup 2025:

Rank	Team	WWCD	Placement	Elims	Total points	Qualification
1	(Indonesia) Alter Ego Ares	2	35	86	121	Advance to the Grand Finals
2	(Pakistan) 4Thrives Esports	2	46	65	111	Advance to the Grand Finals
3	(China) Weibo Gaming	0	31	58	89	Advance to the Grand Finals
4	(South Korea) DRX	2	38	51	89	Advance to the Grand Finals
5	(Vietnam) Team Secret	0	40	46	86	Advance to the Grand Finals
6	(Mongolia) Alpha Gaming	1	26	60	86	Advance to the Grand Finals
7	(China) TT Global	1	21	62	83	Advance to the Grand Finals
8	(Turkey) IDA Esports	0	29	54	83	Advance to the Grand Finals
9	(Turkey) Regnum Carya Esports	2	31	50	81	Advance to the Survival Stage
10	(South Korea) Nongshim RedForce	2	30	46	76	Advance to the Survival Stage
11	(Myanmar) Yangon Galacticos	1	26	49	75	Advance to the Survival Stage
12	(Nepal) Horaa Esports	0	21	49	70	Advance to the Survival Stage
13	(Brazil) Alpha7 Esports	2	26	44	70	Advance to the Survival Stage
14	(Saudi Arabia) POWR eSports	2	23	40	63	Advance to the Survival Stage
15	(India) Team AxTMG	1	29	33	62	Advance to the Survival Stage
16	(Saudi Arabia) Team Vision	0	18	41	59	Advance to the Survival Stage
17	(Thailand) eArena	0	20	38	58	Advance to the Survival Stage
18	(Brazil) INFLUENCE RAGE	0	13	41	54	Advance to the Survival Stage
19	(Saudi Arabia) R8 Esports	0	11	39	50	Advance to the Survival Stage
20	(Brazil) INTENSE GAME	0	18	27	45	Advance to the Survival Stage
21	(Turkey) Fire Flux Esports	0	19	19	38	Advance to the Survival Stage
22	(France) Team Falcons	0	11	26	37	Advance to the Survival Stage
23	(Japan) KINOTROPE gaming	0	5	31	36	Advance to the Survival Stage
24	(Egypt) Team GAMAX	0	9	17	26	Advance to the Survival Stage

== Survival Stage ==
Here are the standings of the Survival Stage of PUBG Mobile World Cup 2025:

Rank	Team	WWCD	Placement	Elims	Total points	Qualification
1	(Nepal) Horaa Esports	2	36	72	108	Advance to the Grand Finals
2	(Turkey) Fire Flux Esports	2	40	64	104	Advance to the Grand Finals
3	(Saudi Arabia) POWR eSports	2	31	73	104	Advance to the Grand Finals
4	(Turkey) Regnum Carya Esports	1	36	64	100	Advance to the Grand Finals
5	(Thailand) eArena	2	36	56	92	Advance to the Grand Finals
6	(South Korea) Nongshim RedForce	1	28	64	92	Advance to the Grand Finals
7	(France) Team Falcons	0	29	42	71	Advance to the Grand Finals
8	(Myanmar) Yangon Galacticos	1	31	39	70	Advance to the Grand Finals
9	(Brazil) INFLUENCE RAGE	0	22	47	69	Eliminated
10	(Saudi Arabia) R8 Esports	1	20	35	55	Eliminated
11	(Saudi Arabia) Team Vision	0	14	36	50	Eliminated
12	(Brazil) INTENSE GAME	0	10	38	48	Eliminated
13	(Brazil) Alpha7 Esports	0	19	26	45	Eliminated
14	(India) Team AxTMG	0	9	28	37	Eliminated
15	(Japan) KINOTROPE gaming	0	12	18	30	Eliminated
16	(Egypt) Team GAMAX	0	11	16	27	Eliminated

== Grand Finals ==
Here are the standings of the Grand Finals of PUBG Mobile World Cup 2025:

Rank	Team	WWCD	Placement	Elims	Total points
1	(Myanmar) Yangon Galacticos	4	62	95	157
2	(China) Weibo Gaming	2	58	84	142
3	(Mongolia) Alpha Gaming	1	44	97	141
4	(South Korea) DRX	1	50	67	117
5	(Turkey) Regnum Carya Esports	2	50	62	112
6	(South Korea) Nongshim RedForce	1	36	74	110
7	(Pakistan) 4Thrives Esports	1	31	78	109
8	(Indonesia) Alter Ego Ares	2	28	76	104
9	(Nepal) Horaa Esports	1	31	69	100
10	(France) Team Falcons	2	31	64	95
11	(Turkey) IDA Esports	0	41	51	92
12	(Saudi Arabia) POWR eSports	1	28	61	89
13	(Vietnam) Team Secret	0	34	49	83
14	(Turkey) Fire Flux Esports	0	15	67	82
15	(Thailand) eArena	0	23	34	57
16	(China) TT Global	0	14	40	54

== Final standings ==
The 2025 PUBG Mobile World Cup's $3,050,000 USD prizepool is divided into separate categories. Each team will earn prizemoney based on how well they did in the Group Stage, Survival Stage and Grand Finals. The tournament's MVP earns $50,000 USD. The maximum amount of money a team may earn is $600,000 USD (if they finish first in the Group Stage, win the Grand Finals, win the Showmatch and Get the most eliminations in the Showmatch), while the maximum an individual player may earn is $50,000 USD (if they win MVP).

Final standings, EWC Club Championship points distribution, and prizepool of $3,050,000 USD distribution are as seen as below:

Final Placement	Team Name	Short Name	Total Prize Pool	EWC Club Points	Group Stage		Survival Stage		Grand Finals	
Final Placement	Team Name	Short Name	Total Prize Pool	EWC Club Points	Placement	Prize Pool	Placement	Prize Pool	Placement	Prize Pool
Champion	(Myanmar) Yangon Galacticos	YG	$547,000	1,000	11th	$29,000	8th	$18,000	1st	$500,000
Runner-up	(China) Weibo Gaming	WBG	$323,500	750	4th	$73,500	-	–	2nd	$250,000
3rd	(Mongolia) Alpha Gaming	APG	$222,000	500	5th	$72,000	-	–	3rd	$150,000
4th	(South Korea) DRX	DRX	$195,000	300	3rd	$75,000	-	–	4th	$120,000
5th	(Turkey) Regnum Carya Esports	REG	$153,000	200	9th	$31,000	4th	$22,000	5th	$100,000
6th	(South Korea) Nongshim RedForce	NS	$140,000	150	10th	$30,000	6th	$20,000	6th	$90,000
7th	(Pakistan) 4Thrives Esports	4T	$157,000	100	2nd	$77,000	-	–	7th	$80,000
8th	(Indonesia) Alter Ego Ares	AE	$150,000	50	1st	$80,000	-	–	8th	$70,000
9th	(Nepal) Horaa Esports	HORAA	$127,500	–	13th	$27,500	1st	$25,000	9th	$60,000
10th	(France) Team Falcons	FLCN	$97,000	–	22nd	$23,000	7th	$19,000	10th	$55,000
11th	(Turkey) IDA Esports	IDA	$118,000	–	8th	$68,000	-	–	11th	$50,000
12th	(Saudi Arabia) POWR eSports	POWR	$95,000	–	14th	$27,000	3rd	$23,000	12th	$45,000
13th	(Vietnam) Team Secret	TS	$110,500	–	6th	$70,500	-	–	13th	$40,000
14th	(Turkey) Fire Flux Esports	FF	$87,500	–	21st	$23,500	2nd	$24,000	14th	$35,000
15th	(Thailand) eArena	EA	$76,500	–	17th	$25,500	5th	$21,000	15th	$30,000
16th	(China) TT Global	TT	$94,000	–	7th	$69,000	-	–	16th	$25,000
17th	(Brazil) INFLUENCE RAGE	INF	$42,000	–	18th	$25,000	9th	$17,000	-	–
18th	(Saudi Arabia) R8 Esports	R8	$40,500	–	19th	$24,500	10th	$16,000	-	–
19th	(Saudi Arabia) Team Vision	VSN	$41,000	–	16th	$26,000	11th	$15,000	-	–
20th	(Brazil) INTENSE GAME	iG	$38,000	–	20th	$24,000	12th	$14,000	-	–
21st	(Brazil) Alpha7 Esports	A7	$41,000	–	12th	$28,000	13th	$13,000	-	–
22nd	(India) Team AxTMG	Ax	$38,500	–	15th	$26,50	14th	$12,000	-	–
23rd	(Japan) KINOTROPE gaming	KN	$33,500	–	23rd	$23,000	15th	$11,000	-	–
24th	(Egypt) Team GAMAX	GMX	$32,000	–	24th	$22,000	16th	$10,000	-	–

*Horaa Esports and Fire Flux Esports won an additional $15,000 and $5,000 respectively from the Showmatch.

=== Base Prize Distribution ===
Here are the Base Prize Distribution of PUBG Mobile World Cup 2025:

Group Stage Total: $1,000,000 USD
Place	Prize (in USD)	Place	Prize (in USD)	Place	Prize (in USD)
1st	$80,000	9th	$31,000	17th	$25,500
2nd	$77,000	10th	$30,000	18th	$25,000
3rd	$75,000	11th	$29,000	19th	$24,500
4th	$73,500	12th	$28,000	20th	$24,000
5th	$72,000	13th	$27,500	21st	$23,500
6th	$70,500	14th	$27,000	22nd	$23,000
7th	$69,000	15th	$26,500	23rd	$22,500
8th	$68,000	16th	$26,000	24th	$22,000

Survival Stage Total: $280,000 USD
Place	Prize (in USD)	Place	Prize (in USD)
1st	$25,000	9th	$17,000
2nd	$24,000	10th	$16,000
3rd	$23,000	11th	$15,000
4th	$22,000	12th	$14,000
5th	$21,000	13th	$13,000
6th	$20,000	14th	$12,000
7th	$19,000	15th	$11,000
8th	$18,000	16th	$10,000

Grand Finals Total: $1,700,000 USD
Place	Prize (in USD)	Place	Prize (in USD)
1st	$500,000	9th	$60,000
2nd	$250,000	10th	$55,000
3rd	$150,000	11th	$50,000
4th	$120,000	12th	$45,000
5th	$100,000	13th	$40,000
6th	$90,000	14th	$35,000
7th	$80,000	15th	$30,000
8th	$70,000	16th	$25,000

Showmatch Total: $20,000 USD
Place	Prize (in USD)
1st	$10,000
Most Elims
$10,000

=== Awards ===
Award name	Prize (in USD)	Participant
FMVP	$50,000	(Mongolia) DOK (APG)
Best IGL	–	(Myanmar) Smile (YG)
Grenade Master	–	(Mongolia) DOK (APG)
Field Medic	–	(Mongolia) DOK (APG)
Eagle Eye	–	(Nepal) NoFear (HORAA)
