= Xtreme Gaming =

European esports organization

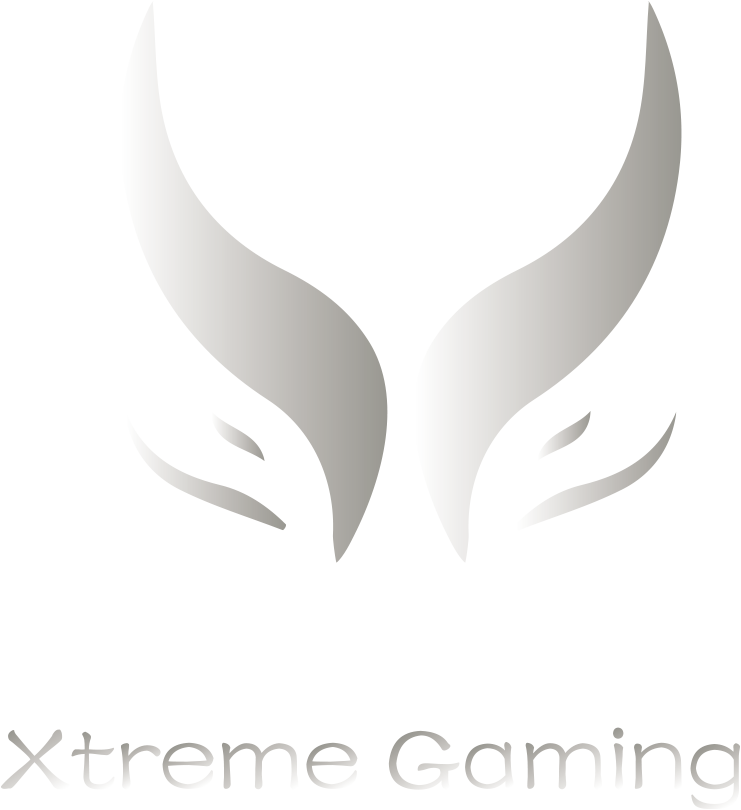
- Founded: 2021; 5 years ago
- Location: Chinese
- Colors: Silvery, Black
- CEO: Ye Yi
- Championships: The International 2025
- Partners: Ame｜ NothingToSay｜ Xxs｜ fy｜ xNova

Xtreme Gaming is a Chinese Dota 2 team.

The team is founded by Yang Yiqing (the founder of Azure Ray).The organization later became the sole proprietorship of Ye Yi (叶亿).

The team's current ranking is 11th out of 121 teams, with their best-ever ranking being 1st place on February 28, 2024, and their worst being 61st on November 29, 2023.

XG has been recognized as the best-performing Dota 2 team in China in 2025.

== Player Roster ==
=== Active ===
ID	Name	Position	Join Date
Ame	Wang Chunyu	1	2025-03-04
NothingToSay	Cheng Jin Xiang	2	2025-10-01
Xxs	Lin Jing	3	2023-12-27
fy	Xu Linsen	4	2025-10-01
xNova	Yap Jian Wei	5	2025-10-01
xiao8	Zhang Ning	Coach	2025-03-04

=== Ame ===
Wang "Ame" Chunyu began his professional career in 2015 with CDEC.Youth, later playing for CDEC and LGD Gaming (later PSG.LGD).

- 2016–2019: After competing in the TI6 China Qualifiers, he achieved significant success with PSG.LGD, winning the EPICENTER XL and MDL Changsha Major in 2018. During this period, he placed fourth at TI7, second at TI8, and third at TI9.
- 2020–2022: Following a brief stint with CDEC in early 2020, he returned to LGD, winning the WePlay AniMajor and finishing as runner-up at TI10 in 2021. In 2022, he secured multiple DPC China regional titles before entering an inactive status in December to take a break.
- 2023–Present: In 2023, Wang represented the Chinese national team and won the gold medal at the 19th Asian Games in Hangzhou. He officially returned to professional competition in December 2023 by joining Xtreme Gaming (XG). In September 2025, he led XG to a second-place finish at The International 2025 (TI15) after a close 2–3 grand final against Team Falcons.

== Timeline ==
=== 2021 ===
January 16th - The roster is revealed; Just, Storm, AYuNiD, Karkur and 桃.

November 22nd - A new roster is revealed; J, Paparazi, Srf, Pyw and Dy.

=== 2022 ===
January 6 - J and Srf goes inactive while lou and old eLeVeN join the team.

November 24 - The team parts ways with old eLeVeN as his contract ended while lou is transferred to Ybb Gaming.

December 6 - Srf registers with Outsiders From CN.

December 7 - Ghost and JT- join the team.

=== 2023 ===
March 4 - Pyw is transferred to Invictus Gaming.

March 8 - Kaka joins the team while coach bLink is replaced by LaNm.

May 9 - Coach LaNm leaves to join Azure Ray.

May 15 - Fenrir joins the team as head coach.

July 7 - Kaka leaves to join Team Aster.

July 10 - XinQ joins the team.

July 31 - Paparazi灬 retires from the competitive scene.

August 3 - Xm joins the team.

November 2 - Ghost is no longer with the team.

November 11 - JT- leaves to join Invictus Gaming.

November 28 - Xm and XinQ leave to join Azure Ray.

December 11 - Ame joins the team.

December 27 - Xm, Xxs, XinQ and coach Maps join the team.

=== 2024 ===
June 6 - The team partners with Weibo Gaming, competing as WBG.XG for Riyadh Masters 2024.

October 3 - Dy retires from the competitive scene.

October 20 - XinQ is moved into inactive, Pyw and 天命 join the team as substitutes.

November 12 - Ame and 天命 leave the team while Xxs is moved into inactive. Lou, niu and poloson join the team.

=== 2025 ===
March 4 - Lou, niu, poloson and coach Maps leave the team, Ame and coach xiao8 join the team while Xxs and XinQ return to the active roster.

April 3 - Undyne is replaced by 天命.

April 30 - 天命 is replaced by poloson.

September 20 - poloson leaves for Yakult Brothers.

October 1 - Xm and XinQ leaves the team. NothingToSay, fy and xNova join the team.

== Results ==
Date	Place	Tier	Tournament	Result		Prize
2025-09-14	2nd	Tier 1	The International 2025	2: 3	Team Falcons	$374,676
2025-08-03	3rd	Tier 1	Clavision Masters 2025: Snow-Ruyi	0: 2	Team Tidebound	$87,500
2025-05-16	1st	Tier 2	Asian Champions League 2025	3: 2	Team Tidebound	$100,000
2024-08-04	1st	Tier 1	Clavision: Snow Ruyi	3: 1	Team Spirit	$152,500
2024-07-19	7th - 8th	Tier 1	Riyadh Masters 2024	0: 2	BetBoom Team	$200,000
2024-05-19	2nd	Tier 1	PGL Wallachia Season 1	2: 3	Team Spirit	$175,000
2024-04-14	1st	Tier 1	Elite League Season 1	3: 1	Team Falcons	$300,000
2024-03-10	3rd	Tier 1	DreamLeague Season 22	0: 2	BetBoom Team	$120,000
2024-02-24	1st	Tier 2	Games of the Future 2024	2: 0	LGD Gaming	$350,000
2022-02-28	1st	Tier 2	OGA Dota PIT Season 6: China	3: 0	Team MagMa	$62,500
