= The International 2024 =

13th edition of The International

Tournament information
- Game: Dota 2
- Location: Copenhagen, Denmark
- Dates: September 4–15, 2024
- Administrator: Valve
- Tournament formats: Group Stage; Round Robin; Playoffs; Double elimination
- Venue: Royal Arena
- Participants: 16 teams
- Purse: US$2,602,164

Final positions
- Champion: Team Liquid
- 1st runner-up: Gaimin Gladiators
- 2nd runner-up: Tundra Esports

The International 2024 (also known as TI 13 and TI 2024), was the 13th edition of The International, the annual Dota 2 world championship esports tournament hosted by Valve, the game's developer. The tournament was held at the Royal Arena in Copenhagen, Denmark. Sixteen teams competed in the tournament to win the Aegis of Champions.

This was the first edition of the tournament that has returned to the format it had in the early years, in which direct invites are given out to the teams following their rankings throughout separate tournaments being held globally, following the abolition of the Dota Pro Circuit after the 2023 edition of The International had concluded. The event was won by The International 2017 champions Team Liquid, who defeated the previous years' finalist Gaimin Gladiators 3–0 in the final.

== Background ==
Valve announced that Copenhagen would play host to the crowning event of the Dota 2 competitive season around September 2024, but they are yet to release further details about the format of the tournament, scheduling, and how rankings from tournaments across the world will affect rankings and secure direct invitations for the teams participating.

== Teams ==
The direct invites for the tournament were announced on May 27, with 6 teams earning their spots in the tournament based on the performances in the previous tournaments during the year.

Direct invitation

- Team Spirit
- Xtreme Gaming
- Team Falcons
- Team Liquid
- Gaimin Gladiators
- BetBoom Team

Regional qualifier winners

- Entity (Europe)
- Tundra Esports (Europe)
- 1win (Europe)
- Team Zero (China)
- G2.iG (China)
- Talon Esports (Southeast Asia)
- Aurora (Southeast Asia)
- Nouns (North America)
- HEROIC (South America)
- Beastcoastrt (South America)

== Bracket ==
Upper round 1	Upper round 2	Upper Bracket Finals	Final
A1	Xtreme Gaming	0
C4	Team Liquid	2
A1	Team Liquid	2
B1	Cloud9	0
B1	Cloud9	2
D3	Aurora Gaming	0
A1	Team Liquid	2
C1	Gaimin Gladiators	0
C1	Team Falcons	0
A3	Tundra Esports	2
C1	Tundra Esports	0
B3	Gaimin Gladiators	2
C3	nouns	1
B3	Gaimin Gladiators	2
A1	Team Liquid	3
C1	Gaimin Gladiators	0
Lower round 1	Lower round 2	Lower round 3	Lower round 4	Lower round 5	Lower final
C3	nouns	0
B1	Cloud9	0
B4	Talon Esports	1	D2	BetBoom Team	2
A1	BetBoom Team	0	C2	Team Falcons	2
D2	BetBoom Team	2
C2	Team Falcons	2	C1	Tundra Esports	1
A3	Team Falcons	2
C2	Team Falcons	0	C2	Gaimin Gladiators	2
A4	1w Team	2	C2	1w Team	0
B3	Tundra Esports	2
C2	Team Zero	0
D3	Aurora Gaming	2
B3	Tundra Esports	2
D4	beastcoast	1	B2	HEROIC	1
C1	Aurora Gaming	0	C1	Xtreme Gaming	0
B2	HEROIC	2
B3	Xtreme Gaming	2
C4	Xtreme Gaming	2
D1	Team Spirit	2	A2	Team Spirit	1
A2	G2 x IG	0
