= Ame (gamer) =

Professional Chinese DotA 2 player for PSG.LGD

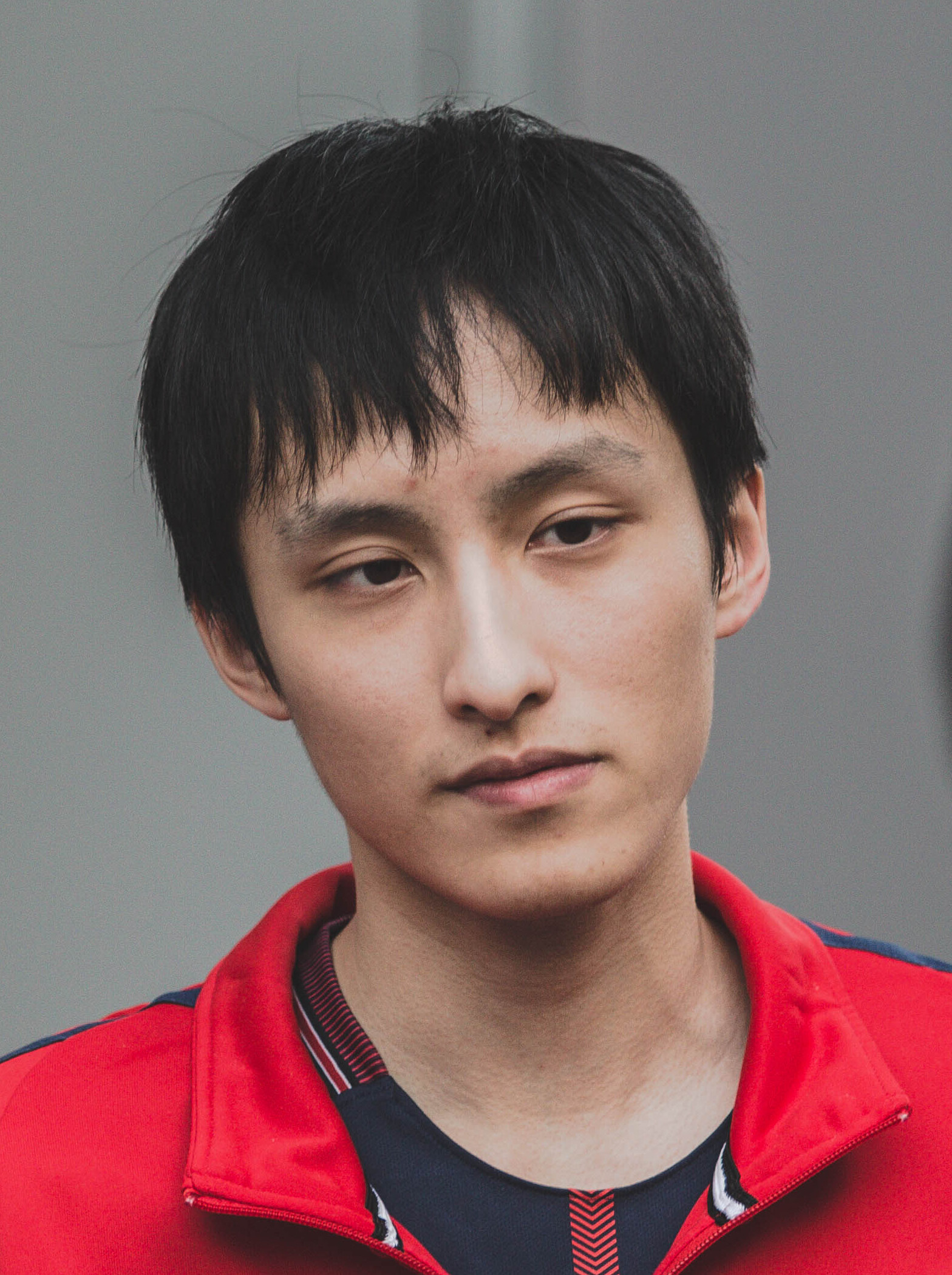
- Ame in 2018
- Born: Wang Chunyu; April 7, 1997 (age 29); China
- Occupation: Professional gamer
- Years active: 2015–present

Current team
- Team: Xtreme Gaming
- Role: Carry
- Game: Dota 2

Team history
- 2015–2016: CDEC Youth
- 2016–2020: PSG.LGD
- 2020: CDEC Gaming
- 2020–2023: LGD Gaming (Note: Known as PSG.LGD from April 2018 to September 2023.)
- 2023–present: Xtreme Gaming
Medal record
Esports
Representing China
Asian Games
Gold medal – first place	2022 Hangzhou	Dota 2

Chinese name
- Simplified Chinese: 王淳煜
Transcriptions
Standard Mandarin
- Hanyu Pinyin: Wáng Chúnyù

Wang Chunyu (Chinese: 王淳煜; pinyin: Wáng Chúnyù; born April 7, 1997), better known as Ame, is a Chinese professional Dota 2 player for Xtreme Gaming.

== Career ==
Ame started his Dota 2 career by joining the youth squad of CDEC Gaming, the following year he moved to LGD Gaming. They would go on to their first tier 1 tournament win at Mars Dota 2 League 2017 followed by a 4th place finish at The International 2017.

=== 2018–2019 ===
Throughout 2018, Ame and his team had multiple tournament wins and were considered one of the favourites for winning TI8. They eventually lost to OG in the grandfinals in 5 games, followed by a 3rd place finish at TI9 the following year.

=== 2020–2021 ===
After TI9, Ame was moved back to CDEC Gaming, which was also owned by PSG.LGD. On September 16, 2020, a new PSG.LGD roster was formed with Ame returning to PSG.LGD along with players from EHOME. This new roster would go on to dominate the season, and after winning the AniMajor along with a 3rd place finish at the Singapore Major, the team secured a direct invite to The International 2021.

Coming into the tournament, PSG.LGD were considered the heavy favourites for winning the tournament and had an impressive run dropping only 2 games. In the final, they eventually lost to Team Spirit 2–3.

=== 2022–2024 ===
At The International 2022, PSG.LGD, with Ame on the roster, experienced their worst placement since TI6, finishing fifth. Following the tournament, Ame announced he would be taking a break from competitive play and was moved to inactive status for PSG.LGD as of July 12, 2022. This decision came after a period of dominance and high expectations, including near victories at TI8 and TI10.

After a one-year hiatus, Ame made his return to competitive Dota 2 in December 2023, joining Xtreme Gaming (XG) from LGD Gaming. During his time away, Ame focused on streaming and personal matters. XG announced Ame's acquisition on December 11, 2023. Ame joins XG’s roster rebuild for the 2024 season, alongside former Vici Gaming captain Ding “Dy” Cong.

Despite putting up good results and winning several tournaments, his team failed to advance far at The International 2024 as 5th-6th results.

Just after the DreamLeague Season 24 tournament with bad results, Ame decided to leaves and join Gaozu. However, Gaozu performed poorly in ESL One Bangkok 2024 although they have good qualifiers.

In December 2024, Ame joined Yakult Brothers.

=== 2025–present ===
In March 2025, Ame returned to Xtreme Gaming and reunited with coach Xiao8 and changed rosters within the team.

Teams have been successful in lower tier tournament and qualified for The International 2025.

In this tournament, Ame and his team Xtreme advanced to the grand final but once again lost to Team Falcons 2-3.

== Notable accomplishments ==
Year	Place	Tournament	Team
2017	1st place, gold medalist(s)	Mars Dota 2 League 2017	LGD Gaming
2017	4	The International 2017	LGD Gaming
2018	2nd place, silver medalist(s)	Dota 2 Asia Championships 2018	LGD Gaming
2018	1st place, gold medalist(s)	EPICENTER XL	PSG.LGD
2018	1st place, gold medalist(s)	MDL Changsha Major	PSG.LGD
2018	2nd place, silver medalist(s)	The International 2018	PSG.LGD
2019	3rd place, bronze medalist(s)	The International 2019	PSG.LGD
2021	3rd place, bronze medalist(s)	ONE Esports Singapore Major 2021	PSG.LGD
2021	1st place, gold medalist(s)	WePlay AniMajor	PSG.LGD
2021	2nd place, silver medalist(s)	ESL One Fall 2021	PSG.LGD
2021	1st place, gold medalist(s)	OGA Dota PIT Invitational	PSG.LGD
2021	2nd place, silver medalist(s)	The International 2021	PSG.LGD
2022	1st place, gold medalist(s)	Riyadh Masters 2022	PSG.LGD
2022	2nd place, silver medalist(s)	PGL Arlington Major 2022	PSG.LGD
2023	1st place, gold medalist(s)	2022 Asian Games	China
2025	3rd place, bronze medalist(s)	Clavision Masters 2025	Xtreme Gaming
2025	2nd place, silver medalist(s)	The International 2025	Xtreme Gaming
