= Esports at the 2022 Asian Games – Dota 2 =

Dota 2 at the 2022 Asian Games
- Venue: Hangzhou Esports Center
- Date: 29 September – 2 October 2023
- Competitors: 78 from 14 nations

Medalists
gold medal	China; Wang Chunyu, Lu Yao, Yang Shenyi, Zhao Zixing, Yu Yajun, Xiong Jiahan
silver medal	Mongolia; Altanginjiin Bilgüün, Otgondavaagiin Sükhbat, Battsoojiin Mönkh-Erdene, Narankhandyn Batbayasgalan, Dashzevegiin Tögstör
bronze medal	Malaysia; Daniel Chan, Cheng Jin Xiang, Thiay Jun Wen, Ng Wei Poong, Yap Jian Wei, Tue Soon Chuan

The Dota 2 event at the 2022 Asian Games took place from 29 September to 2 October 2023 in Hangzhou, China.

== Schedule ==
All times are China Standard Time (UTC+08:00)

Date	Time	Event
Friday, 29 September 2023	14:00	Group round
Saturday, 30 September 2023	14:00	Quarterfinals
Sunday, 1 October 2023	09:00	Semifinals
Monday, 2 October 2023	14:00	Bronze medal match
Monday, 2 October 2023	19:00	Final

== Seeding ==
A qualification tournament called AESF Road to Asian Games 2022 was played online from 12 to 16 July 2023. The results of this tournament were used to determine the seedings for the Games.

Central Asia	East Asia	South Asia	Southeast Asia	West Asia
Kazakhstan (3–1)	China (1–0)	Nepal (1–0)	Malaysia (4–0)	Jordan (2–0)
Kyrgyzstan (2–2)	Hong Kong (0–1)	India (0–1)	Philippines (3–1)	Saudi Arabia (1–1)
Uzbekistan (2–2)			Laos (2–2)	Oman (0–2)
Iran (2–2)			Myanmar (1–3)	
Turkmenistan (1–3)			Thailand (0–4)	

Kazakhstan, China, Nepal, Malaysia and Saudi Arabia qualified directly to the quarterfinal stage.

== Squads ==
China	Hong Kong	India	Indonesia
Wang Chunyu; Lu Yao; Yang Shenyi; Zhao Zixing; Yu Yajun; Xiong Jiahan	Yee Tsz Hin; Kenton Shum; Richard Ng; Hung Shek Lun; Anthony Cheung; Sze To Hin Ming	Krish Nitin Gupta; Abhishek Yadav; Ketan Goyal; Shubham Shridhar Goli; Darshan Chandan Bata	Muhammad Rizky Anugrah; Randy Sapoetra; Daud Budiawan; Tri Kuncoro; Rizki Varizh; Syaid Resky
Kazakhstan	Kyrgyzstan	Malaysia	Mongolia
Darkhan Madikhan; Amir Akmollin; Abdimalik Sailau; Islambek Shaudyrbayev; Arman Orazbayev	Kyialbek Taiirov; Amanbek Iunusali Uulu; Bektur Kulov; Bakyt Emilzhanov; Abdyrakhman Raiapov	Daniel Chan; Cheng Jin Xiang; Thiay Jun Wen; Ng Wei Poong; Yap Jian Wei; Tue Soon Chuan	Altanginjiin Bilgüün; Otgondavaagiin Sükhbat; Battsoojiin Mönkh-Erdene; Narankhandyn Batbayasgalan; Dashzevegiin Tögstör
Myanmar	Nepal	Philippines	Saudi Arabia
Kaung Sett Hein; Min Khant Mg Mg; Aung Myat Soe; Thi Ha Kyaw Swar; Zaw Rain Sai Aung	Abhinav Shakya; Sesson Karki; Luja Maharjan; Lakshya Tamang; Prajjwol Bista	Eljohn Andales; Mc Nicholson Villanueva; Bryle Alvizo; Djardel Mampusti; Marvin Rushton; Roi Ladines	Aiman Abduljawad; Motaz Ahmed; Malek Al-Laheeb; Turki Al-Anzi; Nasser Al-Daajani; Badr Al-Rashdi
Thailand	Uzbekistan		
Karn Janmanee; Poomipat Trisiripanit; Natthaphon Ouanphakdee; Anurat Praianun; Supanut Chow; Thanathorn Sriiamkoon	Aleksey Bastanov; Saidakbar Akramkhujaev; Vadim Kim; Jamshid Abdurashitov; Shakhzod Mavlyanov; Ruslan Dzigar		

== Results ==
=== Group round ===
==== Group A ====
Pos	Team	Pld	W	L	Pts	Qualification
1	Kyrgyzstan	2	2	0	2	Quarterfinals
2	Philippines	2	1	1	1	
3	India	2	0	2	0	

Source: OCA

	Score	
India	0–1	Kyrgyzstan
India	0–1	Philippines
Kyrgyzstan	1–0	Philippines

==== Group B ====
Pos	Team	Pld	W	L	Pts	Qualification
1	Thailand	2	2	0	2	Quarterfinals
2	Indonesia	2	1	1	1	
3	Hong Kong	2	0	2	0	

Source: OCA

	Score	
Thailand	1–0	Indonesia
Thailand	1–0	Hong Kong
Indonesia	1–0	Hong Kong

==== Group C ====
Pos	Team	Pld	W	L	Pts	Qualification
1	Mongolia	2	1	1	1 (Note: Tied on head-to-head wins (1). Teams are ranked by shortest winning match time.)	Quarterfinals
2	Uzbekistan	2	1	1	1	
3	Myanmar	2	1	1	1	

Source: OCA
Notes:

	Score	
Mongolia	1–0	Uzbekistan
Mongolia	0–1	Myanmar
Uzbekistan	1–0	Myanmar

=== Knockout round ===
Quarterfinals
China	2
Thailand	0
Saudi Arabia	0
Malaysia	2
Kazakhstan	1
Mongolia	2
Kyrgyzstan	2
Nepal	0

Semifinals
China	2
Malaysia	1
Mongolia	2
Kyrgyzstan	0

Final
China	2
Mongolia	1
Bronze medal match
Malaysia	2
Kyrgyzstan	0
