= Mobile Legends: Bang Bang Women's Invitational =

World championship series for the Female Leagues of MLBB

Mobile Legends: Bang Bang Women's International
- Game: Mobile Legends: Bang Bang
- Founded: 2022
- Administrator: Moonton; Esports World Cup
- No. of teams: 9 (2022); 10 (2023); 12 (2024); 16 (2025–present)
- Region: Southeast Asia (2022–2023); International (2024–present)
- Venue: List
- Most recent champions: Team Vitality (MWI 2026)
- Most titles: Team Vitality (4 titles)
- Related competitions: Mobile Legends: Bang Bang Mid Season Cup; Mobile Legends: Bang Bang World Championship
- Tournament format: Group stage: Single round-robin (2022–2024); GSL format (2025-present); Playoffs; Single elimination tournament (2022-present)

The Mobile Legends: Bang Bang Women's International (stylized and commonly referred to as MWI) and formerly known as Mobile Legends: Bang Bang Women's Invitational is an annual world championship series for the female professional leagues of the Multiplayer online battle arena (MOBA) mobile game Mobile Legends: Bang Bang. MWI has been hosted by Moonton since its first season in 2022 and by 2024, the tournament was included in the Esports World Cup. It is the most important championship for the female division in MLBB, held mostly coinciding the Mobile Legends: Bang Bang Mid Season Cup.

In 2022, the first MWI Championship featured two from the top three most-competitive regions in MLBB, Indonesia, Philippines, and Malaysia with direct invites being delivered to Laos, Singapore and Cambodia. In its inaugural season, the female division of Indonesian organization Bigetron Alpha, Bigetron Era won the inaugural MWI 2022 championship 3–1 over co-patriots GPX Basreng.

In 2024, MWI was inaugurated as one of the two divisions for MLBB in the 2024 Esports World Cup and since its inception, it has followed different group and playoff bracket stages with the most-recent tournament—MWI 2025—following the GSL tournament format for the wildcard and group stage while it follows a single-elimination tournament for the knockout stage.

Team Vitality (formerly Bigetron Era) and Indonesia are the most-successful team and region in MWI, winning 2 titles back-to-back from 2022 to 2023.

== History ==
The inaugural was held in 2022 in Jakarta, Indonesia from January 27 to January 30, 2022. Game developer Moonton's Managing Director of Global Esports Lucas Mao said in a statement, MWI aims to "celebrate female strength and empowerment" following the repeated calls of an international tournament for the female division in a predominantly male eSports scene for MLBB. This was particularly observed during MPL Indonesia Season 9 when ONIC Esports included their talent Viroenita "Vior" Sutanto as their sub mid-laner, the first and only time a female was slotted in an MPL reserve slot, showing the disparity and the lack of competitions for the female population.

In 2024, Moonton announced that they are localizing leagues to continue the stretch of empowerment for women, thus during their annual M Summit (Moonton Games' business summit) it was revealed that the Philippines was to get a development on a local women's league. This follows the continual trend of honing local talent from the women's pool of players and see the potential in joining groups to both the local MPL and MDL leagues.

=== 2022 ===
The inaugural season of MWI was held in Jakarta, Indonesia from January 27 until the Grand Finals on January 30, 2022. With a prize pool of US$15,000, the inaugural had the smallest prize pool to date. It featured nine teams–7 direct invites and 2 qualified through a local league–to compete for the title of MWI champions. All teams were split into two groups to play a single round-robin format–due to the odd-number of teams, Group A had 5 teams while Group B had four–and only eight teams will qualify to the Knockout stage. Indonesian representatives Bigetron Era and GPX Basreng were the grand finalists of this event with Bigetron defeating Malaysian team Karra and GPX defeating Filipino team Bren Victress. Bigetron Era won the inaugural 3–1.

=== 2023 ===
The second season of MWI was held again in Jakarta from February 6 until the Grand Finals match on February 12, 2023. It featured ten teams across the Southeast Asian Region with eight teams qualifying through regional leagues while the two Filipina representatives—Omega Empress and Risk Velkhana—were directly invited. Similar to the inaugural, all teams were split into two groups of five and played a single-round robin. The top four teams from each group were then drawn for the Knockout stage. Indonesian representatives Bigetron Era and GPX Basreng returned for the second-consecutive Indonesian grand finals in the MWI with both teams eliminating both Filipina representatives Omega Empress and Risk Velkhana in the semis in 2–0 sweeps. Bigetron Era won their second MWI title and the only team thus far to go back-to-back.

=== 2024 ===
The third season of MWI became the largest expansion for the invitational yet after it became part of the 2024 Esports World Cup as the female division for Mobile Legends: Bang Bang. The third season was held in Riyadh, Saudi Arabia from July 24 until the Grand Finals match on July 27, 2024. The tournament featured twelve teams from across the international community where MLBB was both the predominant and rising esport. This year saw the reduction of the Philippines' representatives from two to one. Team Vitality (formerly Bigetron Era's roster) qualifying as the two-time defending champions. Similarly to seasons 1 and 2, all twelve teams were split into four groups of three to play a single-round robin tournament. The top two teams will qualify to the playoff bracket. Team Vitality and Omega Empress of Indonesia and the Philippines, respectively were this year's grand finalists after Vitality won 3–1 against compatriots representatives and former GPX Basreng roster Falcons Vega and Omega sweeping 3–0 CIS representatives Victory Song Gamers (VSG). Omega Empress would bring the Philippines' its first MWI title after sweeping defending champions Vitality in the Grand Finals.

=== 2025 ===
The fourth iteration of MWI was held again in Riyadh, Saudi Arabia from July 15 until the Grand Finals match on July 19, 2025. MWI 2025 expanded from twelve teams to sixteen teams with all groups being split into four bracket groups. Unlike the first three iterations, the Group Stage of MWI 2025 will feature the Global StarCraft II League or GSL Format for the group stage with teams who have a 2–0 and 2–1 record advancing to the knockout stage while 1–2 and 0–2 teams are to be eliminated. Defending champions Natus Vincere PH (formerly Omega Empress' roster) were eliminated in the Quarterfinals by NA representatives Gaimin Gladiators. Meanwhile, former two-time champions Team Vitality remained in title contention. Gaimin Gladiators won over Burmese representatives Terror Queens in the Semifinals 3–1 and secured North America's first Grand Finals slot in professional MLBB, the first time that a non-Asian region qualified for an MLBB Grand Finals in both the men's and women's division. Team Vitality returns to the Grand Finals after sweeping Team Liquid in Semis, the second-consecutive time that the team qualified to the Grand Finals as Team Vitality but the fourth-consecutive time if counted the Bigetron Era time which was the former team of Vitality's players were.

Team Vitality would win their third title in four years against Gaimin Gladiators, the third series where the Grand Finals ended with a sweep. Vitality would make history as the only team to hold three titles of MWI.

=== 2026 ===
The fifth iteration of MWI will be coinciding with the Mid-Season Cup 2026 in Paris, France as the 2026 Esports World Cup relocated for the first time since the tournament began.

== Venues ==
MWI was formerly a Southeast Asian based tournament with the top female teams from Southeast Asian countries competing. From the period of 2022–2023—prior to the tournament's international expansion—the MWI was held in Jakarta, Indonesia for the first two iterations. Since the 2024 iteration, the tournament has now been held in Riyadh, Saudi Arabia as part of the Esports World Cup.

Year	Iteration	Host		Venue
2022	1st	Indonesia	Jakarta	N/A (Online Tournament)
2023	2nd	Indonesia	Jakarta	Summarecon Mall Bekasi
2024	3rd	Saudi Arabia	Riyadh	Boulevard City
2025	4th	Saudi Arabia	Riyadh	Boulevard City
2026	5th	France	Paris	Paris Expo Porte de Versailles

== Results ==
=== Year-by-Year ===
Year	Iteration	Host	Champions	Results		First Runner-Up	Second Runner-Up	Third Runner-Up	Finals MVP	No. of teams
2022	1st	Indonesia	Bigetron Era	3	0	GPX Bersang	Karra and Omega Empress		Viorelle "Vival" Chen	9
2023	2nd	Indonesia	Bigetron Era	3	1	GPX Bersang	Risk Velkhana and Omega Empress		Cindy "Cinny" Siswanto	10
2024	3rd	Saudi Arabia	Omega Empress	3	0	Team Vitality	Falcons Vega and Victory Song Gamers		Sheen "Shinoa" Perez	12
2025	4th	Saudi Arabia	Team Vitality	4	0	Gaimin Gladiators	Terror Queens	Team Liquid	Cindy "Cinny" Siswanto	16
2026	5th	France	Team Vitality	4	2	Natus Vincere PH	Geltek Cyber Team	Galaxy Phoenix	Viorelle "Vival" Chen	16

=== Performances by teams ===
Legend

- 1st – Champions
- 2nd – Runners-up
- 3rd – Third place
- 4th – Fourth place
- SF – Semi-finals
- PO – Playoffs
- PI – Play-in
- GS – Group stage
- WC – Wildcard stage
- Q – Qualified
- • – Did not qualify
- × – Did not enter / Withdrew
- – Nation hosts

The results for GPX Bersang, Bigetron Era, and Omega Empress were included for Falcons Vega, Team Vitality, and Natus Vincere PH, respectively. Meanwhile, HomeGirls and Gaimin Gladiators' results were too included to each other's column for MWI 2024 as Gaimin Gladiators is fueling its own team for MWI 2025.

Team	2022	2023	2024	2025	2026	Times Entered	Times qualified	Top Four total
Team Vitality	1st	1st	2nd	1st	1st	5	5	5
Natus Vincere PH	PO	3rd	1st	PO	2nd	5	5	3
Falcons Vega	2nd	2nd	SF	×	PO	4	4	3
Gaimin Gladiators	×	×	PO	2nd	×	2	2	1
Terror Queens	×	×	×	3rd	×	1	1	1
Geltek Cyber Team	×	×	×	×	3rd	1	1	1
Galaxy Phoenix	×	×	×	×	4th	1	1	1
Team Liquid	×	×	×	4th	•	1	1	1
Bren Victress	SF	×	×	×	×	1	1	1
Karra	SF	×	×	×	×	1	1	1
Risk Velkhana	×	4th	×	×	×	1	1	1
Victory Songs Gamers	×	×	SF	×	×	1	1	1
ONIC Pertiwi	×	×	×	PO	•	1	1	0
Natus Vincere MY	×	×	×	GS	•	1	1	0
On Air Pipol	PO	×	×	×	×	1	1	0
Team HAQ Ladies	×	×	×	×	×	1	1	0
Zeg Iris	×	PO	×	×	×	1	1	0
HomeGirls	×	×	PO	×	×	1	1	0
Falcons Vega MENA	×	×	GS	GS	PO	2	2	0
Twisted Minds Orchid	×	×	×	PO	•	1	1	0
IDNS Princess	PO	×	×	×	×	1	1	0
Impunity Starlets	GS	PO	×	×	×	2	2	0
CFU Serendipity	×	×	GS	GS	×	2	2	0
Tidal Legends Gaming	×	×	GS	GS	•	2	2	0
Lugiámi	PO	×	×	×	×	1	1	0
Gray Odyssey	×	PO	×	×	×	1	1	0
Burmese Ghouls-Reinas	×	GS	×	×	×	1	1	0
Net Angels	×	×	PO	×	×	1	1	0
MDH Phoenix	×	PO	×	×	×	1	1	0
Zino Lillies	×	×	PO	×	×	1	1	0
Virtus.pro FE	×	×	×	PO	×	1	1	0
FUT Esports	×	×	×	PO	GS	1	1	0
DreamMax Girls	×	×	GS	GS	×	2	2	0
Cloud9	×	×	PO	×	×	1	1	0
Rising Rage	×	×	×	GS	×	1	1	0
WAOW GG Esports	×	×	×	GS	×	1	1	0

=== Performances by each nation ===
==== Number of teams by participation ====
Indonesia and the Philippines have the top two number of representation per team in MWI with 8 and 7 teams qualifying since 2022, respectively. Malaysia rounds the top three with six teams qualifying since 2022—and is noticeably the only region apart from the Philippines from MWI 2024—to have their representation dipped from 2 to 1 and followed by Cambodia, Myanmar, and Vietnam, whose consistency since MWI 2023 were observed.

Team	2022	2023	2024	2025	2026	Total
Indonesia	2	2	2	2	2	10
Philippines	2	2	1	2	1	8
Malaysia	2	2	1	1	1	7
Cambodia	1	1	1	1	1	5
Myanmar	×	1	1	1	1	4
Vietnam	×	1	1	1	1	4
Saudi Arabia	×	×	1	1	2	4
Brazil	×	×	1	1	1	3
China	×	×	1	1	1	3
United States	×	×	1	1	1	3
Singapore	1	1	0	0	×	2
CIS	×	×	1	1	×	2
Egypt	×	×	0	1	1	2
Turkey	×	×	0	1	1	2
Mongolia	×	×	0	1	1	2
Laos	1	×	0	0	×	1

==== Number of titles per region ====
Since its inception, Indonesia has made a total of eight top four appearances followed by the Philippines with 6, EECA (CIS) with 2 and the United States, Malaysia, Myanmar and Cambodia each having one.

Region	Title(s)	Runner-up(s)	Top Four Appearance(s)	Championship Team(s)	Runner-up Team(s)	Other Team(s) in the Top 4
Indonesia	4	3	8	Bigetron Era (2022–2023); Team Vitality (2025–2026)	GPX Basreng (2022–2023); Team Vitality (2024)	Falcons Vega (2024)
Philippines	1	1	6	Omega Empress (2024)	Natus Vincere PH (2026)	Omega Empress (2022–2023); Risk Velkhana (2023); Team Liquid (2025)
United States	0	1	1	—	Gaimin Gladiators (2025)	—
Malaysia	0	0	1	—	—	Karra (2022)
Eastern Europe and Central Asia	0	0	2	—	—	Victory Song Gamers (2024); Geltek Cyber Team (2026)
Myanmar	0	0	1	—	—	Terror Queens (2025)
Cambodia	0	0	1	—	—	Galaxy Phoenix (2026)

== See also ==
- Esports World Cup
- Mobile Legends: Bang Bang Mid Season Cup
- Mobile Legends: Bang Bang World Championship
- Mobile Legends: Bang Bang
- MPL Indonesia
- MPL Philippines
- MSC 2025
