= The International 2023 =

12th edition of The International

Tournament information
- Game: Dota 2
- Location: Seattle, Washington, U.S.
- Dates: October 12–29, 2023
- Administrator: Valve
- Tournament formats: Group stage; Single Round Robin tournament; Playoffs; Double Elimination
- Venues: Playoffs Weekend; Seattle Convention Center; Finals Weekend; Climate Pledge Arena
- Participants: 20 teams
- Purse: US$3,380,455

Final positions
- Champion: Team Spirit
- 1st runner-up: Gaimin Gladiators
- 2nd runner-up: LGD Gaming

The International 2023 (commonly referred to as TI 2023 or TI 12) was the concluding tournament of the multiplayer online battle arena (MOBA) game Dota 2. The International is the concluding international tournament of the Dota Pro Circuit in different regions. The tournament ran from October 12 until the Grand Finals on October 29, 2023.

A total of 20 teams qualified to compete in The International with 12 teams qualifying through the Dota Pro Circuit while 8 teams qualified through the regional qualifiers. These eight teams were subdivided into allotments from different regions with two Western European and South American teams and one team from North America, Eastern Europe, China and Southeast Asia, respectively, qualifying through the regional qualifiers.

TI 10 champions Team Spirit won The International 2023 following their early playoff exit during The International 2022. Team Spirit defeated North America's Gaimin Gladiators in the Finals 3-0. Team Spirit is the second team in TI history to win two-world championship titles to the organization with OG being the first back-to-back world champions in 2018 and 2019.

== Venue ==
The International 2023's Group Stage were done through online live broadcasts on several platforms such as YouTube and Facebook with the Playoffs being held at the Seattle Convention Center. Meanwhile, the Grand Finals was done in the Climate Pledge Arena, also in Seattle.

United States
Seattle, Washington
Playoffs Weekend	Finals Weekend
Seattle Convention Center	Climate Pledge Arena
Capacity: 8,000	Capacity: 18,300
The International 2023 is located in the United States

== Format ==
The International 2023 followed a different approach in the Group Stage and Playoffs of the tournament. The event was split into two phases: The Road to The International and The International.

The Road to The International refers to the Group Stage where all 20 teams are set to be split into four groups to matchup into a single Round-robin tournament with Best-of-two matches. The first phase of The Road to The International was specifically made in order to determine the teams competing in Phase 2.

The Top 2 teams during Phase 1 will be matching up with either the Third or Fourth Seed of a different group in a best-of-three match. Phase 2 was conducted in order to determine the placement per team in the 16-team bracket playoffs.

The International is the main playoff event. The teams that have competed in Phase 2 will be seeded accordingly in the Upper Bracket Quarterfinals while the teams who lost in Phase 2 will be seeded accordingly in the Lower Bracket's First Round.

== Participating teams ==
12 of the 20 participating teams qualified through the Dota Pro Circuit, a string of professional tournaments in every region to determine allocated points for teams to qualify to The International. The remaining eight teams qualified through the Regional Qualifiers.

Region	Team Name
Dota Pro Circuit
Europe	Team Liquid
Europe	Tundra Esports
Europe	Team Spirit
CIS	BetBoom Team
CIS	9Pandas
North America	TSM
North America	Shopify Rebellion
North America	Gaimin Gladiators
South America	Evil Geniuses
South America	beastcoast
Southeast Asia	Talon Esports
China	LGD Gaming

Region	Team Name
Regional Qualifiers
North America	nouns
South America	Keyd Stars
South America	Thunder Awaken
Western Europe	Entity
Western Europe	PSG Quest
Eastern Europe	Virtus.pro
China	Azure Ray
Southeast Asia	Team SMG

Ref:

== Group stage ==
=== Group Draw ===
The Group Stage Draw was released by Valve on October 11, 2023. The draw was not broadcast nor given prior to any eSports pages or enthusiasts. The draw featured four groups with five teams each.

Group A	Group B	Group C	Group D
9Pandas	Azure Ray	beastcoast	PSG Quest
Entity	BetBoom Team	Gaimin Gladiators	Talon Esports
Evil Geniuses	Shopify Rebellion	LGD Gaming	TSM
Team SMG	Team Liquid	nouns	Tundra Esports
Team Spirit	Thunder Awaken	Virtus.pro	Keyd Stars

=== Group Stage ===
==== Phase One ====
The Group Stage Weekend began on October 12, 2023, beginning with Phase One. Phase One of the Group Stage Weekend will eliminate one team per group in order to determine the sixteen teams that would qualify in The International playoff bracket itself. Teams eliminated in Phase One would not be contending for the playoffs.

===== Group A =====
Pos	Team	Pld	W	D	L	GF	GA	GD	Pts	Qualification
1	Team Spirit	4	4	0	0	8	0	+8	0	Advance to Phase 2
2	Entity	4	1	2	1	4	4	0	0	Advance to Phase 2
3	9Pandas	4	1	2	1	4	4	0	0	Advance to Phase 2
4	Evil Geniuses	4	0	2	2	2	6	−4	0	Advance to Phase 2
5	Team SMG	4	0	2	2	2	6	−4	0	Eliminated

Source: https://afkgaming.com/dota2/news/ti12-playoffs-schedule-results-and-other-details

===== Group B =====
Pos	Team	Pld	W	D	L	GF	GA	GD	Pts	Qualification
1	Team Liquid	4	3	1	0	7	1	+6	0	Advance to Phase 2
2	BetBoom Team	4	3	0	1	6	2	+4	0	Advance to Phase 2
3	Azure Ray	4	1	2	1	4	4	0	0	Advance to Phase 2
4	Shopify Rebellion	4	0	2	2	2	6	−4	0	Advance to Phase 2
5	Thunder Awaken	4	0	1	3	1	7	−6	0	Eliminated

Source: https://afkgaming.com/dota2/news/ti12-playoffs-schedule-results-and-other-details

===== Group C =====
Pos	Team	Pld	W	D	L	GF	GA	GD	Pts	Qualification
1	LGD Gaming	4	3	1	0	7	1	+6	0	Advance to Phase 2
2	Gaimin Gladiators	4	2	1	1	5	3	+2	0	Advance to Phase 2
3	nouns	4	0	3	1	3	5	−2	0	Advance to Phase 2
4	Virtus.pro	4	0	3	1	3	5	−2	0	Advance to Phase 2
5	beastcoast	4	0	2	2	2	6	−4	0	Eliminated

Source: https://afkgaming.com/dota2/news/ti12-playoffs-schedule-results-and-other-details

===== Group D =====
Pos	Team	Pld	W	D	L	GF	GA	GD	Pts	Qualification
1	Tundra Esports	4	3	1	0	7	1	+6	0	Advance to Phase 2
2	TSM	4	1	2	1	4	4	0	0	Advance to Phase 2
3	Talon Esports	4	2	0	2	4	4	0	0	Advance to Phase 2
4	Keyd Stars	4	0	3	1	3	5	−2	0	Advance to Phase 2
5	PSG Quest	4	0	2	2	2	6	−4	0	Eliminated

Source: https://afkgaming.com/dota2/news/ti12-playoffs-schedule-results-and-other-details

==== Phase Two ====
The Group Stage's Top 2 seeds will face the third or fourth seed of certain groups. Phase Two will determine the placement of each team in the playoff bracket stage with the winning team being seeded in the Upper Bracket while the Losing team in the Lower Bracket. All winning teams will be seeded in the Upper Bracket Quarterfinals against each other while the losing teams would be seeded in the Lower Bracket's Round 1.

A1 vs B3/B4
A1	Team Spirit	2
B4	Shopify Rebellion	0
C1 vs D3/D4
C1	LGD Gaming	2
D4	Keyd Stars	0

D2 vs C3/C4
D2	TSM	0
C4	Virtus.pro	2
B2 vs A3/A4
B2	BetBoom Team	1
A3	9Pandas	2

B1 vs A3/A4
B1	Team Liquid	2
A4	Evil Geniuses	0
D1 vs C3/C4
D1	Tundra Esports	0
C3	nouns	2

C2 vs D3/D4
C2	Gaimin Gladiators	1
D3	Talon Esports	2
A2 vs B3/B4
A2	Entity	0
B3	Azure Ray	2

== Playoffs ==
- Date of tournament: October 27–October 29
- All qualified teams in the second phase of the Group Stage were seeded in the Upper and Lower Brackets with the winning teams in the second phase seeded in the Upper Bracket and the losing teams in the lower bracket.
- All matches in the Upper and Lower Bracket games are Best of three (Bo3) matches and the Grand Finals is a Best of Five match (Bo5).

=== Bracket ===
Upper round 1	Upper round 2	Upper Bracket Finals	Final
A1	Team Spirit	2
C4	Virtus.pro	1
A1	Team Spirit	2
B1	Team Liquid	1
B1	Team Liquid	2
D3	Talon Esports	0
A1	Team Spirit	2
C1	LGD Gaming	0
C1	LGD Gaming	2
A3	9Pandas	0
C1	LGD Gaming	2
B3	Azure Ray	0
C3	nouns	0
B3	Azure Ray	2
A1	Team Spirit	3
C1	Gaimin Gladiators	0
Lower round 1	Lower round 2	Lower round 3	Lower round 4	Lower round 5	Lower final
C3	nouns	2
B1	Team Liquid	1
B4	Shopify Rebellion	0	D2	TSM	0
A1	nouns	0	C2	Gaimin Gladiators	2
D2	TSM	2
C2	Gaimin Gladiators	2	C1	LGD Gaming	0
A3	9Pandas	0
C2	Gaimin Gladiators	2	C2	Gaimin Gladiators	2
A4	Evil Geniuses	0	C2	Gaimin Gladiators	2
B3	Azure Ray	0
C2	Gaimin Gladiators	2
D3	Talon Esports	1
B3	Azure Ray	2
D4	Keyd Stars	0	B2	BetBoom Team	2
C1	BetBoom Team	2	C1	BetBoom Team	1
B2	BetBoom Team	2
B3	Virtus.pro	0
C4	Virtus.pro	2
D1	Tundra Esports	0	A2	Entity	0
A2	Entity	2

== Ranking ==
Team Name	Final position	Prize Pool
Team Spirit	Champions	$1,521,362
Gaimin Gladiators	1st Runner Up	$405,637
LGD Gaming	2nd Runner Up	$270,499
Azure Ray	3rd Runner Up	$185,898
Team Liquid	5th-6th	$109,925
BetBoom Team	5th-6th	$109,925
nouns	7th-8th	$84,489
Virtus.pro	7th-8th	$84,489
TSM	9th-12th	$67,569
9Pandas	9th-12th	$67,569
Talon Esports	9th-12th	$67,569
Entity	9th-12th	$67,569
Shopify Rebellion	13th-16th	$50,761
Evil Geniuses	13th-16th	$50,761
Keyd Stars	13th-16th	$50,761
Tundra Esports	13th-16th	$50,761
Team SMG	17th-20th	$33,840
Thunder Awaken	17th-20th	$33,840
beastcoast	17th-20th	$33,840
PSG Quest	17th-20th	$33,840

Ref:
