= 2025 MLBB Mid Season Cup =

8th iteration of the international tournament Mid-Season Cup

2025 Mobile Legends: Bang Bang Mid-Season Cup
Tournament information
- Sport: Mobile Legends: Bang Bang
- Location: Riyadh, Saudi Arabia
- Dates: 10 July–2 August 2025
- Administrators: Moonton; Qiddiya
- Format: GSL Format (Wild Card and Group Brackets); Single Elimination (Knockout Stage)
- Teams: 16 (Group Stage); 8 (Wild Card)
- Purse: US$3,000,000

Final positions
- Champions: Team Liquid PH
- 1st runner-up: Selangor Red Giants OG Esports
- 2nd runner-up: ONIC Philippines
- MVP: Sanford "Sanford" Vinuya

The 2025 Mobile Legends: Bang Bang Mid-Season Cup was an international tournament of the esports Multiplayer online battle arena game Mobile Legends: Bang Bang. It was the eighth iteration of the competition and the second iteration under the branding "Mid-Season Cup" since its conception in 2024. The tournament began with the Wild Card stage from July 10 to July 13, and ended with the Grand Finals on August 2, 2025.

For the second time, the tournament is in partnership with the 2025 Esports World Cup. It occurred alongside the Mobile Legends: Bang Bang Women's Invitational and other esports titles in the said world cup.

Team Liquid PH won the first MSC title for the organization after winning over the defending champions of Malaysia Selangor Red Giants OG Esports 4–1 in the Grand Finals. This is the first title for the Philippines since MSC 2022 and the second-consecutive season that a Philippines vs. Malaysia Grand Finals took place. Team Liquid PH's Exp Laner Sanford "Sanford" Vinuya was named Finals MVP.

== Background ==
MSC 2025 occurred simultaneously with the 2025 Esports World Cup held in Saudi Arabia. It is an international tournament where numerous major esports titles, such as League of Legends, Dota 2, PUBG: Battlegrounds, and Valorant, are competed by the worlds' most renowned teams. Mobile Legends: Bang Bang was part of the inaugural games played in EWC in 2024.

=== Tournament patch ===
Like other MOBAs, Moonton release patches for the game that would eventually culminate to forming METAs or the "most effective tactics available," alongside the usage of newly released or buffed up heroes for their tactical advantage.

Patch 1.9.91 was used for MSC 2025 and has been available for access since July 9. The primary changes with the patch was the introduction of a new mage named Zetian and the significant nerfs and attribute adjustments to heroes picked for the most effective tactics available (META) in-game. The patch notes summary is live and accessible through the game itself in the Events Tab.

Patch 1.9.91
New Hero
Zetian The Celestian Empress; Mage, Damage/Crowd Control
Ability		Note(s)
Passive	Celestial Armament	Phoenix Crown: Zetian gains increased Spell Vamp after hitting enemy heroes with Phoenix Strike and Phoenix Descent.; Celestial Robe: The power of the Phoenix Spirit periodically protects Zetian, knocking back and stunning any enemy heroes who dare to approach, dealing Magic Damage and granting Zetian a Shield.
Skill 1	Phoenix Strike	Zetian unleashes a Phoenix Wave in the target direction. If it hits an enemy, she automatically casts the next Phoenix Wave, up to 3 times. Zetian can cast other skills during this process. The third Phoenix Wave hits a larger area and pulls targets in the skill's direction for a short distance.
Skill 2	Phoenix Descent	Zetian summons a Phoenix Spirit at the target location, dealing Magic Damage and applying a brief slow effect to enemies in the area. The Phoenix Spirit hovers at the location for 3s, dealing sustained Magic Damage to enemies in a range and reducing enemies' Magic Defense. While the Phoenix Spirit is active, Zetian can use this skill again to command the Phoenix Spirit to charge toward a designated location, dealing Magic Damage and applying a brief slow effect upon arrival.
Ultimate	Fury of the Phoenix	Zetian grants all allied heroes a Movement Speed increase that gradually decays over 3 sec, while unleashing divine retribution upon all enemy heroes, dealing Magic Damage and stunning them on hit. During this time, Zetian gains vision of all enemy heroes. She can cast other skills while channeling this ability.
Hero Adjustments
Major Hero Adjustment(s)
Hero Name		Adjustment(s)
X.Borg		General Indication: BUFF Passive: BUFF – All skills now deal True Damage to enemies in the Overheated state. Previously, only Skill 1 could do this. Ultimate: NERF – Number of Flame Sprays were decreased from 14 to 12.
Kimmy		Kimmy is still a bit too dominant in the new patch. We've slightly turned down her mobility and the crowd control ability of her Ultimate. General Indication: NERF Attributes: NERF – Movement Speed was increased from 255 to 245. Ultimate: NERF – Slow Effect was decreased from 75% to 50%.
Kalea		Kalea is still a bit too dominant in the new patch. We've slightly turned down her healing capability in the early to mid game. General Indication: NERF Passive: NERF – HP Recovery was supposedly 120 + 10% Total HP + 60% Total Magic Power which was decreased to 40 + 10% Total HP + 60% Total Magic Power.
Baxia		Reduced survivability in the early and mid game; slightly increased survivability in the late game. General Indication: NERF Passive: NERF – Final Damage Reduction was 25 at all levels, it was decreased to 15 + (Hero Level x 1).
Joy		Reduced damage output in the mid to late game when Ultimate is unavailable. General Indication: NERF Passive: NERF – Magic Bonus was 55%, it was decreased to 40%.
Granger		Slightly reduced his Skill 1 damage and mobility. General Indication: NERF Skill 1: NERF – Physical Attack Bonus was 50% but it was decreased to 45% and the Movement Speed Bonus while Firing was 15%, it was decreased to 10%.
Uranus		Uranus has been dealing too much damage in the new patch, so we've slightly reduced the extra damage of his Skill 1. General Indication: NERF Skill 1: NERF – Radiance Stack Damage Bonus was originally 8-16 but it was decreased to 6-14.
Lapu-Lapu		After the previous enhancements, Lapu-Lapu's durability has gone beyond our expectations. We aim to change this by slightly reducing his sustained damage absorption in team fights. General Indication: NERF Skill 2: NERF – Damage reduction on hit was 30% + 8% per additional hero hit, it was decreased to 20% + 8% per additional enemy hero hit.
Wanwan		Slightly reduced Wanwan's damage in the mid to late game. General Indication: NERF Attributes: NERF – Physical Attack Growth was 9 but was decreased to 7.
Badang		Slightly reduced Badang's skill control frequency. General Indication: NERF Skill 2: NERF – His second skill cooldown was 9s but it was increased to 11s.

=== Time Rewind ===
The MSC x EWC 2025 management have announced their introduction to the "Time Rewind" tool, the first of its kind to be included in the tournament. The Time Rewind Tool is the ability for marshals to restore a previous point of a gain if an incident affects the competitive integrity of the match. The tool is then used to rewind to a certain point of the game with both sides agreeing to the rewind. The management said that there were only two ways that marshals gave a fair opportunity for both teams to try and fix patches and errors such as the traditional pause where matches are paused in a specific time for five minutes in which marshals and members of the technical team would try to fix the error in game or in the venue or a rematch.

In accordance with the MSC x EWC 2025 handbook, strict provisions were imposed for both the teams and the marshals from ever abusing their rights and authority to use the Time Rewind Tool. The management has said that any tactical exposure for either teams may be experienced if the tool is used however, the management has made it clear that communications between players are prohibited during the pause and only permitted communication will be from the players and marshals only.

== Venue ==
Similarly to MSC 2024, the venue for MSC 2025 will be in Riyadh, Saudi Arabia.

Wildcard Stage	Group Stage	Knockout Stage and Grand Finals
Saudi Arabia
Riyadh
Boulevard City, Backstage	Boulevard City, Backstage	Boulevard City, Arena 2
2025 MLBB Mid Season Cup is located in Saudi Arabia

== Format ==
Fifteen of the sixteen group-stage teams will be outright qualifying from major regions in Mobile Legends. These regions have made a name for themselves as the home of powerhouse teams including Indonesia and the Philippines alongside emerging powerhouse regions such as Malaysia and Singapore. Also included in the group-stage are established regions in their own right, with Moonton accredited competitions being the qualifying tournament for MSC such as Cambodia, MENA, North America, and Turkey. Meanwhile, Myanmar's inception returned following all esports competition halting in the region due to the 2021 Myanmar coup d'état and China with its growing esports base was seemed fitting to be of the same caliber as pre-established teams.

=== Wild card ===
Eight teams from the different regions of accredited Moonton tournaments will battle for the one wildcard slot in the group stage. These eight teams will be grouped into two different groups and will follow the GSL Format—The Global StarCraft II League Format—where all teams have three chances to qualify for the knockouts. The GSL Format has been used as the tournament format for several esports titles including the aforementioned StarCraft II and Dota 2.

In the opening match, the four teams will play a Best-of-3 series. Winning teams will advance and face each other in the winner's bracket while losing teams will advance to the loser's bracket. The team who wins in the winner's bracket will qualify for the knockout stage while the losing team will wait for the winner in the losers bracket. Simultaneously, the winner of the loser's bracket will face the loser of the winner's bracket while the loser of the loser's bracket will be eliminated.

In the redemption round, whoever wins Round 3 will qualify for the knockout stage while the loser will be eliminated. All teams who won 2-0 and 2–1 series will advance, those who loss 1-2 and 0-2 will be eliminated. The four teams who qualified for the knockout stage will battle each other to advance to the wild card finals. The winner of the wild card finals will qualify for the group stage.

=== Group stage ===
In the group stage, the two representatives from Indonesia, the Philippines, and Malaysia, joined by the champions of Myanmar and the EECA (CIS) will be put in Seed 1 while the remaining teams will be put into Seed 2. According to the group stage format video released by MLBB esports on YouTube, these teams were split into two groups prompting regional diversity as per caster Gideon Khew "GideonQ" Wei Yung. All of these teams will be drawn into two brackets and no region will be bracketed in the same group.

Each team will then play a Best-of-3 series in a double-elimination format. Similarly to the Wild Card stage, teams with a record of 2-0 and 2-1 advances and qualifies to the knockout stage while teams with a 1-2 and 0–2 record will be eliminated.

=== Playoffs ===
In the knockout stage, the eight qualified teams will be divided into two groups: teams who won 2–0, and teams who won 2–1. Teams with a 2–0 advantage will have the luxury to pick their 2-1 challengers. In the same video, the thought of a 2–0 team picking a weaker 2–1 team is palpable however, tides may turn regardless of their opponents. As of June 24, according to Gideon, the team who will pick first will only be determined once the competition begins. For the first time since MSC 2023, a third-place match will be introduced. All matches in the knockout stage from the Quarterfinals, Semifinals, and the Third Place match will be a Best-of-5. Only the Grand Finals will be a Best-of-7.

== Qualified teams ==
A total of sixteen teams will be competing in the Group Stage while only eight are to advance to the knockout stage. The wild card stage returned for the third-consecutive time since its inception in 2023.

For MSC 2025, Japan made its MLBB comeback. Japan last competed on a MLBB competition during the MLBB M2 World Championships and has since not competed.

Majority of the qualified teams for MSC 2025 are returning teams from the previous edition and/or during the Southeast Asian Cup editions of the games. These include current champions Selangor Red Giants OG Esports (2024) and former champions ONIC Esports (2019, 2023). MSC 2025 is uniquely the first edition of the games where two sister-teams have qualified for the tournament, that being ONIC Esports and ONIC Philippines.

On June 30, 2025, Moonton announced that S8UL Esports, who qualified as the North American Challenger Tournament (NACT) Spring champions, were no longer eligible to compete at MSC 2025 after two of their players, Michael "MobaZane" Cosgun and Jang "Hoon" Seong-hun, participated in a promotional event for the rival MOBA game Honor of Kings (also present at Esports World Cup) and got disqualified. As a result, NACT Spring runners-up Area 77 qualified in their place.

Legend:

Bold – Background denotes that the team is the Defending champions.

– Background denotes that the team is the Former MSC champions.

– Background denotes that the team's best finish is the Playoff/Knockout stage in its history.

– Background denotes that the team's best finish is the Group Stage in its history.

– Background denotes that the team's best finish is the Wild Card Stage in its history.

– Background denotes that it's the team's first time qualifying for MSC.

Region	League	Path	Team	Short Name
Qualified for the Group Stage
Indonesia	MPL-ID	Season 15 Champions	ONIC Esports	ONIC ID
Indonesia	MPL-ID	Season 15 Runners-Up	RRQ Hoshi	RRQ
Philippines	MPL-PH	Season 15 Champions	Team Liquid PH	TLPH
Philippines	MPL-PH	Season 15 Runners-Up	ONIC Philippines	ONIC PH
Malaysia	MPL-MY	Season 15 Champions	**Selangor Red Giants OG Esports**	**SRG.OG**
Malaysia	MPL-MY	Season 15 Runners-Up	HomeBois	HB
Singapore	MPL-SG	Season 9 Champions	Team Flash	FL
Cambodia	MPL-KH	Season 8 Champions	CFU Gaming	CFU
China	CQ	Qualifier Champions	DianFengYaoGuai	DFYG
Eastern Europe and Central Asia	MCC	Season 5 Champions	Team Spirit	TS
(Middle East and North Africa) MENA	MPL-MENA	Season 7 Champions	Ultra Legends	UL
(South America) LATAM	MPL-LATAM	Season 3 Champions	Corinthians	COR
Turkey	MTC	Season 5 Champions	Aurora Türkiye	RORT
(United States) North America	NACT	~~Spring Champions~~	~~S8UL Esports~~	~~S8~~
(United States) North America	NACT	Spring Runners-Up	Area 77	A77
Myanmar	MSL	Season 1 Champions	Mythic Seal	MYTH
Qualified for the Wild Card Stage
(Middle East and North Africa) MENA	MPL-MENA	Season 7 Runners-Up	Team Falcons	FLCN
(South America) LATAM	MPL-LATAM	Season 3 Runners-Up	INFLUENCE RAGE	RAGE
Eastern Europe and Central Asia	MCC	Season 5 Runners-Up	Virtus.pro	VP
Vietnam	VMC	Spring Champions	Legion Esports	LE
(ASEAN) Southeast Asia	M Challenge Cup	Season 5 Champions	Niightmare Esports	NM
Mongolia	MQ	Qualifier Champions	The MongolZ	MGLZ
China	CQ	Qualifier Runners-Up	Rare Atom	RA
Japan	JQ	Qualifier Champions	ZETA DIVISION	ZD

=== Rosters competing in MSC 2025 ===
Team	Coaching Staff		Main Five					Substitute
Team	Head	Assistant	Exp Lane	Jungler	Mid Lane	Gold Lane	Roam	Substitute
ONIC Esports	Denver "**Yeb**" Miranda	Adi "**Adi**" Asyauri	Moch "**Lutpiii**" Ardianto	Kairi "**Kairi**" Rayosdelsol	Gilang "**SANZ**"	Clayton "**Savero**" Kuswanto	Nicky "**Kiboy**" Pontonuwu	Nowee "**Ryota**" Macasa
ONIC Esports	Denver "**Yeb**" Miranda	Adi "**Adi**" Asyauri	Moch "**Lutpiii**" Ardianto	Kairi "**Kairi**" Rayosdelsol	Gilang "**SANZ**"	Clayton "**Savero**" Kuswanto	Nicky "**Kiboy**" Pontonuwu	Calvin "**CW**" Winata
RRQ Hoshi	Alfi "**Khezcute**" Nelphyana	Rasyid "**NMM**" Perwira	Rendy "**Dyrennn**" Syahputra	Arthur "**Sutsujin**" Sunarkho	Hajirin "**Rinz**" Arafat	Muhammad "**Toyy**" Rizky	Said "**Idok**" Ridho	Arron "**Chenn**" Fernaus
Team Liquid PH	Rodel "**Ar Sy**" Cruz	Harold "**Tictac**" Reyes	Sanford "**Sanford**" Vinuya	Karl Gabriel "**KarlTzy**" Nepomuceno	Alston "**Sanji**" Pabico	Kiel Calvin "**Oheb**" Soriano	Jaypee "**Jaypee**" dela Cruz	John "**Perkziva**" Sumawan
ONIC Philippines	Anthony "**YnoT**" Senedrin	Jeniel "**Haze**" Bata-Anon	Jann "**Kirk**" Gutierrez	King Cyric "**K1NGKONG**" Perez	Frince "**Super Frince**" Ramirez	Grant Duane "**Kelra**" Pillas	Borris "**Brusko**" Parro	Jaylord "**Hate**" Gonzales
Selangor Red Giants OG Esports	Michael Angelo "**Arcadia**" Bocado	Poon "**OzoraVeki**" Kok Sing	Mark Genzon "**Kramm**" Rusiana	Muhammad Haqqullah "**Sekys**" Shahrul Zaman	Hazziq Danish "**Stormie**" Rizwan	John Vincent "**Innocent**" Banal	Muhammad Qayyum "**Yums**" Suhairi	Ilmam Zareef "**Gojes**" Zulkifli
HomeBois	Ervan "**Belin**" Pratama	Aep "**Jester**" Saepudin	Kenley "**VELL**" Zefanya	Muhammad Ikmal Hakimy "**EYYMAL**" Azemy	Mohammad Irwandy "**IZANAMIYEYO**" Lim	Adam "**MELQT**" Hamidun	Vincentsius Ivan "**IVANN**" Adrianto	Muhammad Eiman "**EIVA**" Shah
Team Flash	Bjorn "**Zeys**" Ong	Bellamy "**Lolsie**" Yeov	Kenneth "**Kenn**" Lee	Jaymark "**Hadess**" Lazaro	Jankurt "**KurtTzy**" Matira	Keith Lim "**Vanix**" Wei Jun	Akihiro "**JPL**" Furusawa	Yeo "**Diablo**" Wee Lun
Team Flash	Bjorn "**Zeys**" Ong	Bellamy "**Lolsie**" Yeov	Kenneth "**Kenn**" Lee	Jaymark "**Hadess**" Lazaro	Jankurt "**KurtTzy**" Matira	Keith Lim "**Vanix**" Wei Jun	Akihiro "**JPL**" Furusawa	Adam Chong "**Adammir**" Jin Ee
CFU Gaming	Gesang "**T1m3go**" Jiacuo	**HanXie**	Vann "**Wadu**" Dane	Nhem "**Detective**" Chandavan	Chiang "**Zee**" Piseth	Khoun "**Xingg**" Amey	Sok "**Boxi**" Viera	Chhuon "**Oppi**" Phengkong
Ultra Legends	Mohammad Rashed "**JED**" Taheri	N/A	Mostafa "**Dark Lord**" Mahmoud	Osama "**Throwboy**" Saleh	Omar Sami "**Quanok**" Ali	Mahmoud Alhassan "**Pharaoh**" Mahmoud	Mahmoud "**RiseCrim**" Rawash	**Jersey**
Ultra Legends	Mohammad Rashed "**JED**" Taheri	N/A	Mostafa "**Dark Lord**" Mahmoud	Osama "**Throwboy**" Saleh	Omar Sami "**Quanok**" Ali	Mahmoud Alhassan "**Pharaoh**" Mahmoud	Mahmoud "**RiseCrim**" Rawash	**Elshadow Omar**
Corinthians	Diego "**Daarkness**" Casado	Diego "**Daarkness**" Casado	Kristofer "**Hesu**" Calderon	Ralph "**Flick**" Hamoy	Matheus "**Frostt**" Santos	Lucas "**Upa**" Araujo	Luiz "**Luiizz**" Alves	Everton "**Buzizio**" de Mattos
Team Spirit	Nikita "**Coldstar**" Morozov	**Harmonysoul**	Mathaios "**Kid Bomba**" Chatzilakos	Alexander "**ONESHOT**" Sharkov	Kemiran "**Sunset Lover**" Kochkarov	Pak Anton "**Hiko**" Igorevich	Stanislav "**SAWO**" Reshnyak	**Euphoria**
Aurora Turkiye	Aniel "**Master The Basics**" Jiandani (Note: Master The Basics is the head coach of Aurora Gaming's Philippine team. He will be the head coach stand-in for Aurora Turkiye, the sister team of Aurora PH. He will be joined by Dexter "Dex Star" Alaba, the assistant coach for Aurora PH, as an Analyst.)	Sacit "**Bagdalpesh**" Arslan	Mehmet Ibrahim "**Lunar**" Ilgun	Sidar "**Tienzy**" Mentese	Ahmet Taha "**Rosa**" Batir	Siyar "**Sigibum**" Akbulut	Furkan "**APEX47**" Akbulut	Eric "**ReiNNNN**" Khor
Area 77	**SIR ROSE**	**Jennyqt**	Rainiel "**URESHIII**" Logronio	**Shiro**	**HUNTER**	Ricer "**ISO**" Dela Cruz	Zidric "**JOYBOJ**" Beltran	**IDIRKK**
Mythic SEAL	Thet Lynn "**LynnXDaddy**" Hitut	**Gif**	Kyaw Zin **"Kalay**" Htet	Pyae Hein **"Kenn**" Ko	Hein Arkar **"Niko**" Htet	Kyaw Zin **"Zippy**" Bo	Ye Yint **"Bo Ye**" Naing	**Potay**
DiangFengYaoGuai	Lu "**Sasa**" Khai Bean	Saw "**Loong**" Kee Loong	Kiel Vj "**Kielvj**" Cruzem	Kenneth "**Super Kenn**" Marcello	Lin "**Yione**" Haifeng	Tang "**Loong**" Zelong	Liu "**zzzed**" Chenjian	Pei "**Pxiu**" Jian
Team Falcons	Francis "**Duckeyyy**" Glindro (Note: Glindro coached Falcons during their first match against Rare Atom during Day 1. It's unknown yet if Dizon will become the coach in the following matches.)	Amr Wafed "**Kakashi**" Elsayed	Ayman Othman "**Sanji**" Alqarni	Bien "**Boyet**" Chumecera	Muath Saad "**Cuffin**" Alkoraini	Sulaiman Musallam "**Saano**" Alrashdi	Moayed Ayman "**Troll**" Kharaba	Mohammed "**Tarzan**" Kharabah
Influence Rage	Ignacio "**BlackJax**" de Bautista	N/A	Lucas Fagundez "**Chino**" de Bautista	Diego Eduardo "**Jotun**" Balog	Darien Quiroz "**Chan**" Barraza	Angel "**Furry**" Samuel	Pablo "**Pakitoo**" Balog	Luan Marcos "**SR Luuma**" de Oliveira (Note: de Oliveira also acts as the team's analyst during MPL Latam.)
Virtus.pro	Kenneth "**Flysolo**" Coloma	Zaur "**zaur egoist**" Magomadov (Note: Magomadov was the Jungler for Virtus pro however, it was later revealed that Magomadov would transition to the analyst coaching staff role; Omega's Andrew "Andoryuuu" Flora became his stand-in replacement.)	Denis "**BadKot**" Bogomolav	Andrew "**Andoryuuu**" Flora	Dmitry "**sorrybae**" Belyaev	Egor "**Super Egorka**" Bugaev	Vladimir "**Pluto**" Misyurin	**Kerrigan**
Legion Esports	Arkar "**Sabo**" Phyo Min	**Moaii**	Nguyễn "**Meow**" Đức Nam	Nguyễn "**Jowga**" Văn Tô Đô	Justin Ahron "**Shocker**" Guanga	Nguyễn "**Daylight**" Việt Anh	Mark Gleen "**Kram God**" Florencio	Lâm "**Hehehehehehe**" Văn Đạt
Legion Esports	Arkar "**Sabo**" Phyo Min	**Moaii**	Nguyễn "**Meow**" Đức Nam	Nguyễn "**Jowga**" Văn Tô Đô	Justin Ahron "**Shocker**" Guanga	Nguyễn "**Daylight**" Việt Anh	Mark Gleen "**Kram God**" Florencio	Phạm "**GNART**" Ngọc Trạng
Niightmare Esports	Sathaphone "**Alain**" Kayavong	N/A	Zeke "**BAI LUCI**" Himaya	Mongkonethong "**2Ez4Lexxy**" Sinbandit	Phonesana "**Sosoul**" Inthavongxay	Kampaseuth "**Khammy**" Hanxana	Sengathit "**J4ZBIN**" Phounsavat	**Ninjaaa**
Niightmare Esports	Sathaphone "**Alain**" Kayavong	N/A	Zeke "**BAI LUCI**" Himaya	Mongkonethong "**2Ez4Lexxy**" Sinbandit	Phonesana "**Sosoul**" Inthavongxay	Kampaseuth "**Khammy**" Hanxana	Sengathit "**J4ZBIN**" Phounsavat	Marcelino Jr. "**I DID**" Grijaldo
ZETA Division	**Tink**	N/A	**june1**	**ten**	**psuke**	**muiminet**	**Kani**	**Falcon**
The MongolZ	**Booyo**	**Hanayuuh**	**Mumu**	Bilguun "**Zetsu**" Zagd-Ochir	Lkhagvasuren "**Mayki**" Otgonbayar	Tsotsaikhan "**Rynx K**" Nyamtsogt	Turbayar "**Shenlynn**" Bulgan	**Ganaa**
Rare Atom	Raymond "**Raizan**" Tandrian	Jiang "**G1deaon**" Taiyu	Ramadhoni "**Donn**"	Delvin "**Lanaya**" Gunawan	Zhang "**Paofu**" Hao	Wang "**Mikey**" Zixuan	Zhang "**Cat9**" Ye	Mao "**Shengge**" Yinpin

== MSC Wildcard ==
=== Group A bracket ===
Group Matches (Best-of-3)
Team Falcons	1
Rare Atom	2
Legion Esports	2
The MongolZ	1
Elimination (Best-of-3)
Team Falcons	0
The MongolZ	2

Upper Bracket (Best-of-3)
Rare Atom	2
Legion Esports	0
Lower Bracket (Best-of-3)
Legion Esports	0
The MongolZ	2

Qualified
Rare Atom
Qualified
The MongolZ

=== Group B bracket ===
Group Matches (Best-of-3)
ZETA Division	1
INFLUENCE RAGE	2
Virtus.pro	2
Niightmare Esports	0
Elimination (Best-of-3)
ZETA Division	2
Niightmare Esports	1

Upper Bracket (Best-of-3)
INFLUENCE RAGE	1
Virtus.pro	2
Lower Bracket (Best-of-3)
INFLUENCE RAGE	2
ZETA Division	0

Qualified
Virtus.pro
Qualified
INFLUENCE RAGE

In a closed-door draw session for the wild-card stage, the eight competing teams for the MSC Wild Card stage were grouped into the following brackets. Four teams will advance to the Wild Card Crossover Knockout Stage where only one team will advance to the main Group Stage.

=== MSC Wildcard Crossover Match ===
China's Rare Atom and ARM' Virtus.pro qualified for the wildcard crossover matches in the semifinals as one of the four remaining teams to qualify for the MSC Group Stage. Rare Atom qualified to the crossover semis after defeating Vietnam's Legion Esports 2-0 and Virtus.pro qualified to the crossover semis after defeating Argentina's INFLUENCE RAGE 2–1.

Virtus.pro won the crossover wildcard match against Rare Atom, 3–1. This gives the EECA a second slot for the MSC Group Stage Brackets for the first time in MSC history. They join the Philippines, Indonesia and Malaysia as the only four regions to have two teams qualify for its regions.

Wildcard Semifinals (Best-of-3)
A1	Rare Atom	2
B2	INFLUENCE RAGE	0

Wildcard Finals (Best-of-5)
B1	Virtus.pro	3
A1	Rare Atom	1

Wildcard Semifinals (Best-of-3)
B1	Virtus.pro	2
A2	The MongolZ	0

== MSC Group Bracket ==
Following the conclusion of the crossover match, MPL Casters Gideon Khew "GideonQ" Wei Yung and Dan "Leo" Cubangay oversaw the draw portion for the MSC Group Brackets. Teams were separated into two different pools and each team were drawn to the two Group Brackets. The first team was drawn for Group A and the second team was drawn for Group B and this format was followed until all sixteen teams were drawn to their group.

ONIC Philippines was drawn originally to Group A however, with Team Liquid PH being drawn earlier and both teams are from the same region, MSC rules were implemented so that ONIC Philippines and Team Liquid PH would be in different groups, thereby making Mythic SEAL, the last team to be drawn from Pool 1, to be part of Group A instead of Group B.

=== Group A Bracket ===
Upper Bracket Semifinals (Best-of-3)
Team Liquid PH	2
Ultra Legends	0
ONIC Esports	2
CFU Gaming	1
SRG OG Esports	2
Virtus.pro	1
Mythic SEAL	2
Corinthians Esports	1
Lower Bracket Semifinals (Best-of-3)
Ultra Legends	1
CFU Gaming	2
Virtus.pro	2
Corinthians Esports	1

Upper Bracket Finals (Best-of-3)
Team Liquid PH	2
ONIC Esports	1
SRG OG Esports	1
Mythic SEAL	2
Lower Bracket Finals (Best-of-3)
SRG OG Esports	2
CFU Gaming	0
ONIC Esports	2
Virtus.pro	0

Qualified
Team Liquid PH
Mythic SEAL
Qualified
SRG OG Esports
ONIC Esports

=== Group B Bracket ===
Upper Bracket Semifinals (Best-of-3)
Homebois	2
Team Flash	1
Team Spirit	2
DianFengYaoGuai	0
RRQ Hoshi	2
Area 77	0
ONIC Philippines	1
Aurora Türkiye	2
Lower Bracket Semifinals (Best-of-3)
Team Flash	2
DianFengYaoGuai	0
Area 77	0
ONIC Philippines	2

Upper Bracket Finals (Best-of-3)
Homebois	0
Team Spirit	2
RRQ Hoshi	2
Aurora Türkiye	1
Lower Bracket Finals (Best-of-3)
Aurora Türkiye	2
Team Flash	1
Homebois	0
ONIC Philippines	2

Qualified
Team Spirit
RRQ Hoshi
Qualified
Aurora Türkiye
ONIC Philippines

=== Knockout stage ===
As stated in the format video, all teams with a 2-0 aggregate will be selecting their opponents. Teams with the 2-0 aggregate are: Team Liquid, RRQ Hoshi, Team Spirit, and Mythic SEAL also in that order. The order to pick was determined by the speed of their game finishes with Team Liquid being the only team to finish their games under 1 hour. These four teams will pick one of their opponents from the 2-1 aggregate in SRG OG Esports, ONIC Esports, ONIC Philippines, and Aurora Türkiye.

The format of this stage is a single elimination bracket, meaning teams who lose in the quarterfinals will automatically drop out of the tournament, while those who lose in the semifinals will battle for the third place.

Quarterfinals (Bo5)
Team Liquid PH	3
Aurora Türkiye	0
Mythic SEAL	0
ONIC Esports	3
RRQ Hoshi	2
SRG OG Esports	3
Team Spirit	1
ONIC Philippines	3

Semifinals (Bo5)
Team Liquid PH	3
ONIC Esports	1
SRG OG Esports	3
ONIC Philippines	2

Grand Finals (Bo7)
Team Liquid PH	4
SRG OG Esports	1
Third Place Match (Bo5)
ONIC Philippines	3
ONIC Esports	2

==== Quarterfinals ====
Only the Philippines remained with two of its representatives advancing to the Semifinals in MSC 2025 after Team Liquid's 3–0 win over Aurora Türkiye and ONIC Philippines' 3–1 win over Team Spirit. Team Liquid will face MSC 2023 champions ONIC Esports in the Semifinals while ONIC Philippines will face the defending champions Selangor Red Giants OG Esports in Semis.

Quarterfinals Match 1	July 30, 2025	Team Liquid PH	3	–	0	Aurora Türkiye	Boulevard City, Riyadh
	17:00 PHT	Team Liquid wins the series, 3–0					
		Gold: 46,047; Turrets: 8; Lord: 1; Turtles: 2; Orange Buff: 8; Purple Buff: 10	Game Time: 12:33; Team Liquid leads the series, 1–0			Gold: 30,165; Turrets: 1; Lord: 0; Turtles: 1; Orange Buff: 4; Purple Buff: 3	
		Gold: 36,026; Turrets: 7; Lord: 1; Turtles: 3; Orange Buff: 5; Purple Buff: 9	Game Time: 10:43; Team Liquid leads the series, 2–0			Gold: 24,782; Turrets: 0; Lord: 0; Turtles: 5; Orange Buff: 5; Purple Buff: 3	
		Gold: 58,660; Turrets: 9; Lord: 3; Turtles: 2; Orange Buff: 11; Purple Buff: 9	Game Time: 18:53; Team Liquid wins the series, 3-0; Player of the Match: Sanji			Gold: 51,575; Turrets: 0; Lord: 0; Turtles: 0; Orange Buff: 6; Purple Buff: 8	

Quarterfinals Match 2	July 30, 2025	Mythic SEAL	0	–	3	ONIC Esports	Boulevard City, Riyadh
	18:00 PHT	ONIC wins the series, 3-0					
		Gold: 42,129; Turrets: 4; Lord: 0; Turtles: 2; Orange Buff: 7; Purple Buff: 6	Game Time: 14:28; ONIC leads the series, 1-0			Gold: 44,777; Turrets: 7; Lord: 1; Turtles: 1; Orange Buff: 6; Purple Buff: 10	
		Gold: 37,005; Turrets: 3; Lord: 0; Turtles: 1; Orange Buff: 4; Purple Buff: 7	Game Time: 15:17; ONIC leads the series, 2-0			Gold: 51,354; Turrets: 7; Lord: 2; Turtles: 2; Orange Buff: 11; Purple Buff: 10	
		Results were not shown	Game Time: 19:37; TBD leads the series, 0-0; Player of the Match: Kairi			Results were not shown	

Quarterfinals Match 3	July 31, 2025	RRQ Hoshi	2	–	3	SRG OG Esports	Boulevard City, Riyadh
	17:00 PHT	SRG OG Esports wins the series, 3-2					
		Gold: 64,058; Turrets: 7; Lord: 2; Turtles: 1; Orange Buff: 9; Purple Buff: 9	Game Time: 20:36; RRQ leads the series, 1-0			Gold: 59,384; Turrets: 6; Lord: 1; Turtles: 2; Orange Buff: 8; Purple Buff: 7	
		Gold: 39,442; Turrets: 1; Lord: 0; Turtles: 2; Orange Buff: 5; Purple Buff: 7	Game Time: 14:13; The series is tied, 1-1			Gold: 49,324; Turrets: 9; Lord: 1; Turtles: 1; Orange Buff: 6; Purple Buff: 6	
		Gold: 42,418; Turrets: 4; Lord: 0; Turtles: 1; Orange Buff: 5; Purple Buff: 8	Game Time: 15:25; SRG leads the series, 2-1			Gold: 48,460; Turrets: 6; Lord: 2; Turtles: 2; Orange Buff: 7; Purple Buff: 6	
		Gold: 36,152; Turrets: 7; Lord: 1; Turtles: 3; Orange Buff: 5; Purple Buff: 8	Game Time: 10:27; The series is tied, 2-2			Gold: 24,701; Turrets: 1; Lord: 0; Turtles: 0; Orange Buff: 4; Purple Buff: 3	
		Results of the match weren't shown	Game Time: 14:50; SRG wins the series, 3-2; Player of the Match: Stormie			Results of the match weren't shown	

Quarterfinals Match 4	July 31, 2025	Team Spirit	1	–	3	ONIC Philippines	Boulevard City, Riyadh
	18:00 PHT	ONIC Philippines wins the series, 3-1					
		• Gold: 47,063 • Turrets: 7 • Lord: 2 • Turtles: 3 • Orange Buff: 9 • Purple Buff: 8	Game Time: 13:51; Team Spirit leads the series, 1-0			• Gold: 33,969 • Turrets: 1 • Lord: 0 • Turtles: 0 • Orange Buff: 5 • Purple Buff: 5	
		• Gold: 52,273 • Turrets: 9 • Lord: 2 • Turtles: 3 • Orange Buff: 8 • Purple Buff: 8	Game Time: 14:48; The series is tied, 1-1			• Gold: 40,414 • Turrets: 1 • Lord: 0 • Turtles: 0 • Orange Buff: 4 • Purple Buff: 5	
		• Gold: 91,237 • Turrets: 9 • Lord: 3 • Turtles: 2 • Orange Buff: 17 • Purple Buff: 16	Game Time: 29:37; ONIC leads the series, 2-1			• Gold: 91,250 • Turrets: 5 • Lord: 1 • Turtles: 1 • Orange Buff: 9 • Purple Buff: 9	
		Results were not shown for this match	Game Time: 18:46; ONIC wins the series, 3-1; Player of the Match: Brusko			Results were not shown for this match	

==== Semifinals ====
MSC 2024 Semifinalists Team Liquid PH qualified to the Grand Finals after a 3–1 victory over Indonesian champions ONIC Esports while MSC 2024 champions Selangor Red Giants OG Esports won a close 3–2 series victory over the MLBB M6 World Champions ONIC Philippines in a chance to repeat as champions.

Semifinals Match 1	August 1, 2025	SRG OG Esports	3	–	2	ONIC Philippines	Boulevard City, Riyadh
	17:00 PHT	SRG OG Esports advances to the Grand Finals, 3–2					
		• Gold: 55,984 • Turrets: 9 • Lord: 3 • Turtles: 2 • Orange Buff: 7 • Purple Buff: 11	Game Time: 17:41; SRG leads the series, 1–0			• Gold: 46,282 • Turrets: 0 • Lord: 0 • Turtles: 1 • Orange Buff: 9 • Purple Buff: 5	
		• Gold: 33,399 • Turrets: 1 • Lord: 0 • Turtles: 0 • Orange Buff: 5 • Purple Buff: 4	Game Time: 12:24; The series is tied, 1–1			• Gold: 43,866 • Turrets: 9 • Lord: 1 • Turtles: 2 • Orange Buff: 5 • Purple Buff: 6	
		• Gold: 35,007 • Turrets: 7 • Lord: 1 • Turtles: 3 • Orange Buff: 4 • Purple Buff: 7	Game Time: 10:38; SRG leads the series, 2–1			• Gold: 25,742 • Turrets: 0 • Lord: 0 • Turtles: 0 • Orange Buff: 6 • Purple Buff: 4	
		• Gold: 26,284 • Turrets: 1 • Lord: 0 • Turtles: 0 • Orange Buff: 2 • Purple Buff: 3	Game Time: 11:05; The series is tied, 2–2			• Gold: 38,767 • Turrets: 8 • Lord: 1 • Turtles: 3 • Orange Buff: 6 • Purple Buff: 6	
		Results were not shown for this match	Game Time: 17:40; SRG OG Esports wins the series, 3-2; Player of the Match: Sekyss			Results were not shown for this match	

Semifinals Match 2	August 1, 2025	Team Liquid PH	3	–	1	ONIC Esports	Boulevard City, Riyadh
	18:00 PHT	Team Liquid PH advances to the Grand Finals, 3-1					
		• Gold: 48,332 • Turrets: 9 • Lord: 2 • Turtles: 2 • Orange Buff: 7 • Purple Buff: 11	Game Time: 14:15; Team Liquid leads the series, 1–0			• Gold: 37,272 • Turrets: 1 • Lord: 0 • Turtles: 1 • Orange Buff: 5 • Purple Buff: 4	
		• Gold: 74,595 • Turrets: 9 • Lord: 3 • Turtles: 1 • Orange Buff: 10 • Purple Buff: 15	Game Time: 25:39; Team Liquid leads the series, 2–0			• Gold: 76,722 • Turrets: 7 • Lord: 1 • Turtles: 2 • Orange Buff: 12 • Purple Buff: 10	
		• Gold: 47,418 • Turrets: 6 • Lord: 1 • Turtles: 2 • Orange Buff: 8 • Purple Buff: 9	Game Time: 16:26; Team Liquid leads the series, 2-1			• Gold: 49,814 • Turrets: 6 • Lord: 1 • Turtles: 1 • Orange Buff: 6 • Purple Buff: 6	
		Results were not shown for this match	Game Time: 14:32; Team Liquid wins the series, 3-1; Player of the Match: KarlTzy			Results were not shown for this match	

==== Battle for Third ====
The sister teams of ONIC Esports and ONIC Philippines were in the battle for third match for MSC 2025, the first since MSC 2023. ONIC Esports took the match point early at 2-1 however, ONIC Philippines rallied for a comeback 3–2 victory, securing the Philippines the third place while Indonesia finishes their best finish yet in two consecutive years in fourth.

Battle for Third	August 2, 2025	ONIC Philippines	3	–	2	ONIC Esports	Boulevard City, Riyadh
	17:00 PHT	ONIC Philippines wins the series, 2-2					
		• Gold: 65,956 • Turrets: 9 • Lord: 4 • Turtles: 2 • Orange Buff: 10 • Purple Buff: 13	Game Time: 21:16; ONIC Philippines leads the series, 1–0			• Gold: 59,095 • Turrets: 6 • Lord: 0 • Turtles: 1 • Orange Buff: 7 • Purple Buff: 8	
		• Gold: 35,352 • Turrets: 0 • Lord: 0 • Turtles: 1 • Orange Buff: 4 • Purple Buff: 4	Game Time: 14:20; The series is tied, 1–1			• Gold: 49,595 • Turrets: 9 • Lord: 2 • Turtles: 2 • Orange Buff: 8 • Purple Buff: 9	
		• Gold: 41,028 • Turrets: 7 • Lord: 1 • Turtles: 1 • Orange Buff: 7 • Purple Buff: 8	Game Time: 14:30; ONIC Esports leads the series, 2-1			• Gold: 7 • Turrets: 2 • Lord: 1 • Turtles: 2 • Orange Buff: 6 • Purple Buff: 8	
		• Gold: 66,356 • Turrets: 8br> • Lord: 0 • Turtles: 3 • Orange Buff: 10 • Purple Buff: 8	Game Time: 14:32; The series is tied, 2-2			• Gold: 60,723 • Turrets: 7 • Lord: 3 • Turtles: 0 • Orange Buff: 12 • Purple Buff: 14	
		Results were not shown for this match	Game Time: 14:44; ONIC Philippines wins the series, 3-2; Player of the Match: K1NGKONG			Results were not shown for this match	

==== Grand Finals ====
After dropping Game 1, Team Liquid PH won four straight games to defeat the defending champions of MSC, Selangor Red Giants OG Esports to win the Philippines its fourth MSC title and their first organizational MSC title. Team Liquid PH also returns the MSC championship back to the Philippines for the first time in three years since RSG Philippines' last win in 2022.

Grand Finals	August 2, 2025	Team Liquid PH	4	–	1	SRG OG Esports	Boulevard City, Riyadh, Saudi Arabia
	18:00 PHT	Team Liquid wins the Grand Finals, 4-1					
		• Gold: 41,959 • Turrets: 1 • Turtles: 1 • Lord: 0 • Orange Buff: 7 • Purple Buff: 7	Game Time: 15:31; SRG OG Esports leads the series, 1-0			• Gold: 48,221 • Turrets: 6 • Turtles: 2 • Lord: 2 • Orange Buff: 6 • Purple Buff: 7	
		• Gold: 60,658 • Turrets: 9 • Turtles: 2 • Lord: 3 • Orange Buff: 10 • Purple Buff: 14	Game Time: 18:10; The series is tied, 1-1			• Gold: 47,773 • Turrets: 0 • Turtles: 1 • Lord: 0 • Orange Buff: 8 • Purple Buff: 3	
		• Gold: 47,155 • Turrets: 7 • Turtles: 2 • Lord: 1 • Orange Buff: 8 • Purple Buff: 11	Game Time: 14:32; Team Liquid PH leads the series, 2-1			• Gold: 38,184 • Turrets: 1 • Turtles: 1 • Lord: 0 • Orange Buff: 6 • Purple Buff: 4	
		• Gold: 38,317 • Turrets: 8 • Turtles: 3 • Lord: 1 • Orange Buff: 7 • Purple Buff: 6	Game Time: 10:07; Team Liquid PH leads the series, 3-1			• Gold: 22,965 • Turrets: 0 • Turtles: 0 • Lord: 0 • Orange Buff: 3 • Purple Buff: 4	
		Results were not shown for this match	Game Time: 15:26; Team Liquid PH wins the series, 4-1			Results were not shown for this match	

== MSC Final Standings ==
Team	Wild Card Stage						Group Stage				Knockout Stage				Final Placement	Prize Pool Allocation	EWC Club Points
Team	Round 1		Round 2		Knockouts		Round 1		Round 2		Knockout Stage				Final Placement	Prize Pool Allocation	EWC Club Points
Team	UBS	LBS	UBF	LBF	CM	WCM	UBS	LBS	UBF	LBF	QF	SF	TPM	GF	Final Placement	Prize Pool Allocation	EWC Club Points
Team Liquid	—						2–0	—	2–1	—	RORA; 3:0	ONIC; 3:1	—	SRG; 4:1	Champions	US$1,000,000	1,000
SRG OG Esports	—						2–1	—	1–2	2–0	RRQ; 3:2	ONIC; 3:2	—	TLPH; 1:4	First Runner-Up	US$500,000	500
ONIC Philippines	—						1–2	2–0	—	2–0	TS; 3:1	SRG; 2:3	ONIC; 3:2	—	Second Runner-Up	US$250,000	300
ONIC Esports	—						2–0	—	1–2	2–0	MYTH; 3:0	TLPH; 1:3	ONIC; 2:3	—	Third Runner-Up	US$150,000	300
RRQ Hoshi	—						2–0	—	2–1	—	SRG; 2:3				5th–8th	US$100,000	200
Team Spirit	—						2–0	—	2–0	—	ONIC; 1:3				5th–8th	US$100,000	200
Aurora Türkiye	—						2–1	—	1–2	2–1	TLPH; 0:3				5th–8th	US$100,000	200
Mythic SEAL	—						2–1	—	2–1	—	ONIC; 0:3				5th–8th	US$100,000	200
Homebois	—						2–0	—	0–2	0–2					9th–12th	US$66,000	0
Team Flash	—						0–2	2–1	—	1–2					9th–12th	US$66,000	0
CFU Gaming	—						1–2	2–1	—	0–2					9th–12th	US$66,000	0
Virtus.pro	2–0	—	2–1	—	2–0	3–1	1–2	2–1	—	0–2					9th–12th	US$66,000	0
Ultra Legends	—						0–2	1–2							13th–16th	US$50,000	0
Corinthians Esports	—						1–2	1–2							13th–16th	US$50,000	0
DianFengYaoGuai	—						0–2	0–2							13th–16th	US$50,000	0
Area77	—						0–2	0–2							13th–16th	US$50,000	0
Rare Atom	2–1	—	2–0	—	2–0	1–3									17th	US$41,000	0
The MongolZ	1–2	2–0	—	2–0	0–2										18th–19th	US$35,000	0
INFLUENCE RAGE	2–1	—	1–2	2–1	0–2										18th–19th	US$35,000	0
Legion Esports	2–1	—	0–2	0–2											20th–21st	US$32,500	0
ZETA Division	1–2	2–1	—	0–2											20th–21st	US$32,500	0
Niightmare Esports	0–2	1–2													22nd–23rd	US$30,000	0
Team Falcons	1–2	0–2													22nd–23rd	US$30,000	0

== 2025 MLBB Women's Invitational ==
2025 Mobile Legends: Bang Bang Women's Invitational
Tournament information
- Sport: Mobile Legends: Bang Bang
- Location: Riyadh, Saudi Arabia
- Dates: 15–19 July 2025
- Administrators: Moonton; Qiddiya
- Format: GSL Format (Group Brackets); Single Elimination (Knockout Stage)
- Teams: 16 (Group Stage)
- Purse: US$500,000

Final positions
- Champions: Team Vitality
- 1st runners-up: Gaimin Gladiators
- 2nd runners-up: Terror Queens
- MVP: Cindy "Cinny" Siswanto

Also occurring in the 2025 Esports World Cup is the Mobile Legends: Bang Bang Women's Invitational, the second iteration of the MWI was held with both MSC and EWC 2025, and the third iteration of the tournament itself. MWI is the professional female division of the MLBB esports competition and is the pinnacle tournament for the female division.

MWI featured sixteen teams from across the international scene. Similarly to its male counterparts, the group stage format is similar except, MWI featured a four group stage bracket qualifiers instead of two. Each team was grouped into four and it determined the eight teams that qualified for the playoffs and the eight teams eliminated.

Defending MWI champions NAVI Philippines—the team that acquired the roster of Smart Omega Empress—was swept by North American representatives Gaimin Gladiators in the Quarterfinals. Team Vitality won the tournament and their third title with the core championship roster from MWI 2022 and 2023.

=== Qualified teams ===
Most regions held local qualifiers for female teams to qualify for MWI 2025 however, Indonesian representatives Team Vitality and ONIC Pertiwi are both teams that have finished Top 2 in the Southeast Asian Invitational league Battle of Gamehers of which, NAVI Philippines were among the teams competing. Vitality were the champions of this invitational while Pertiwi were third behind NAVI PH.

Like MSC 2025, two sister teams have qualified for MWI 2025, NAVI Philippines and NAVI Malaysia whom have their main team, NAVI Indonesia competing in MPL Indonesia.

Legend:

Bold – Background denotes that the team is the Defending champions.

– Background denotes that the team is the Former MWI champions.

– Background denotes that the team's best finish is the Playoff/Knockout stage in its history.

– Background denotes that the team's best finish is the Group Stage in its history.

– Background denotes that the team's best finish is the Wild Card Stage in its history.

– Background denotes that it's the team's first time qualifying for MSC.

Region	League	Qualification	Team	Group	Short Name
Indonesia	Battle of Gamehers	Best Indonesian Team (#1)	Team Vitality	A	VIT
Indonesia	Battle of Gamehers	Best Indonesian Team (#2)	ONIC Pertiwi	D	ONPW
Philippines	Athena League	Qualifier champions	**NAVI Philippines** (Note: European organization NAVI acquired Smart Omega Empress' roster and the players for NAVI PH are the defending champion roster.)	**C**	**NVPH**
Philippines	Athena League	Qualifier runner-up	Team Liquid PH	B	TLPW
Malaysia	MYSG Qualifier	Qualifier champions	NAVI Malaysia	B	NVMY
Cambodia	Queen Legends	Season 1 champions	CFU Serendipity	C	CFUS
MENA	Africa Cup	Qualifier champions	Falcons Vega Mena	A	FLVM
MENA	MENA Qualifier	Qualifier champions	Twisted Minds Orchid	A	TWO
Brazil	LATAM Qualifiers	Qualifier champions	DreamMax Girls	D	DMXG
CIS	Lady MVP	Season 7 champions	Rising Rage	D	RR
Mongolia	ESN MWI Qualifier	Qualifier champions	WAOW GG Esports	A	WAOW
Mekong	MEKONG Qualifier	Qualifier champions	Virtrus.pro FE	C	VPFE
Turkey	Turkiye Qualifier	Qualifier champions	FUT Esports	D	FUT
United States	North America Qualifier	Qualifier champions	Gaimin Gladiators	B	GG
China	China Qualifier	Qualifier champions	Tidal Legends Gaming	B	TLG
Myanmar	Myanmar Qualifier	Qualifier champions	Terror Queens	C	TQ

=== Rosters competing in MWI 2025 ===
Team	Coaching Staff		Main Five					Substitute
Team	Head	Assistant	Exp Lane	Jungler	Mid Lane	Gold Lane	Roam	Substitute
Team Vitality	N/A		**Fumi** (Venry Lim)	**Vival** (Viorelle Chen)	**Cinny** (Cindy Siswanto)	**Chell** (Michelle Siswanto)	**Vivian** (Vivi Indrawaty)	**Venom** (Jeanne Sylvi)
ONIC Pertiwi	N/A		**Navillera** (Habsyah Maifa)	**Xev** (Xeviola Maureen)	**Liv** (Livia Putri)	**Y1PPY**	**Pou** (Salsabila Mia)	**Cartaslim**
NAVI Philippines	**KingSalman** (Salma Macarambon)	**Aggressive** (John Paul Aveño)	**Ayanami** (Gwyneth Diagon)	**Keishi** (Kaye Alpuerto)	**Amoree** (Rica Amores)	**Shinoa** (Sheen Perez)	**Meraaay** (Mery Vivero)	**Lexaaa** (Alexandria Dardo)
Team Liquid Philippines	**Joy Boy** (Vincent De Guzman)	N/A	**Daiki**	**Ramici** (Trinity Ramos)	**Zaishii**	**CLA**	**Isuna**	**Soju**
NAVI Malaysia	**Aish** (Muhammad Faris Bin Badrul Zaman)	N/A	**Shaa** (Qurratul Nizam)	**Rina** (Afrina Ali)	**Hannie** (Hanis Dashuki)	**Fafau** (Nurul Fauzi)	**Remund** (Nadiya Bacriun)	**Yuki** (Nor Shahar)
CFU Serendipity	N/A		**MOSHIII** (Chanpisey Yong)	**Tegami** (Rin Chanthana)	**Faa**	**YuiFendi** (Maraty Ol)	**UEE** (Ee Prum)	**Pex**
Falcons Vega MENA	N/A		**Velvet** (Hadeel Abouelftouh)	**Sunlight** (Engy Beshay)	**Yui** (Rawan Abdalazeem)	**Names** (Asmaa Thabet)	**Fvvn** (Alaa Galous)	**Nucci** (Nourhan Abdelaal)
DreamMax Girls	N/A		**Day** (Daiana Neves)	**Angeliss** (Luciana Cristina)	**Camiis** (Camila de Melo)	**Bl4zktty** (Isabela Soares)	**Lucy** (Geovanna Alves Barreto)	**Pickmehai**
Rising Rage	**XavTzy**	N/A	**Zazha**	**Evredian**	**Everyy**	**Bondi**	**Asuna**	**Zefirka**
WAOW GG Esports	**Bebex**	**Nonaxn**	**Kairin**	**Phos**	**Mikewazovski**	**Rikka**	**Ayame**	N/A
Virtus.pro Fe	N/A		**Daisy** (Nông Thị Ngọc Ánh)	**Starsoyy** (Anisa Putri)	**Saa** (Văng Thị Yến Nhi)	**Liv** (Olivia Benita Wijaya)	**Kao** (Đỗ Thị Huyền Trang)	N/A
FUT Esports	N/A		**Unohana**	**Mireya**	**Zendaya**	**Mieko**	**Nora**	N/A
Gaimin Gladiators	**Rexvinn** (Kelvin Unting)	**Midnight** (Neil De Guzman)	**Aria** (Sharifah Alla Fakrrurozi)	**Nicholette** (Nicole Huang)	**Sayori**	**CxZ Panda** (Cindy Zhou)	**Ashlay** (Ashley Ann)	**JEWEL** (Jey Rose Enriquez)
Twisted Minds Orchid	N/A		**Lyrx**	**HIDE**	**Miss Meow**	**Lunar**	**Livin**	**Rafa**
Tidal Legends Gaming	**Catvin** (Zhang Bowen)	**Gangan** (Yuan Shenao)	**Bay** (Yan Ran)	**Chokess** (Jiang Jiali)	**Vermouth** (Chen Yuqing)	**YinHuai** (Liu Jihan)	**Kenzaki** (Zhang Qian)	**Infinite** (Liu Jihan)
Terror Queens	**Msk** (Min Khant)	N/A	**Hlaing** (Yadanar Hlaing)	**Ruii**	**LunaLynn** (Lynn Naing)	**CKOSHIII** (Wint Linn)	**Kuu** (Hsu Zin)	**Molly** (Thet Htar Thuzar)

=== Group stage ===
On June 27, 2025, the MWI Group Draw occurred on a closed-door setup. Similarly to MSC 2025 wild card, the Group Stage was played through the GSL Format with only eight teams advancing to the Knockout Stage: 4 teams from the Upper Brackets and 4 teams from the Lower Brackets.

==== Group A Bracket ====
**Group Matches** (Best-of-3)
Twisted Minds Orchid	0
**Team Vitality**	**2**
Waow GG Esports	0
**Falcons Vega MENA**	**2**
**Elimination** (Best-of-3)
**Twisted Minds Orchid**	**2**
Waow GG Esports	1

**Upper Bracket** (Best-of-3)
**Team Vitality**	**2**
Falcons Vega MENA	0
**Lower Bracket** (Best-of-3)
Falcons Vega MENA	0
**Twisted Minds Orchid**	**2**

**Qualified**
**Team Vitality**
**Twisted Minds Orchid**

==== Group B Bracket ====
**Group Matches** (Best-of-3)
Tidal Legends Gaming	0
**Team Liquid PH**	**2**
Gaimin Gladiators	0
**Natus Vincere MY**	**2**
**Elimination** (Best-of-3)
Tidal Legends Gaming	1
**Gaimin Gladiators**	**2**

**Upper Bracket** (Best-of-3)
**Team Liquid PH**	**2**
Natus Vincere MY	1
**Lower Bracket** (Best-of-3)
Natus Vincere MY	1
**Gaimin Gladiators**	**2**

**Qualified**
**Team Liquid PH**
**Gaimin Gladiators**

==== Group C Bracket ====
**Group Matches** (Best-of-3)
**Natus Vincere PH**	**2**
CFU Serendipity	0
**Terror Queens**	**2**
Virtus.pro FE	0
**Elimination** (Best-of-3)
CFU Serendipity	0
**Virtus.pro FE**	**2**

**Upper Bracket** (Best-of-3)
**Natus Vincere PH**	**2**
Terror Queens	1
**Lower Bracket** (Best-of-3)
**Terror Queens**	**2**
Virtus.pro FE	0

**Qualified**
**Natus Vincere PH**
**Terror Queens**

==== Group D Bracket ====
**Group Matches** (Best-of-3)
**ONIC Pertiwi**	**2**
DreamMax Girls	0
**FUT Esports**	**2**
Rising Rage	0
**Elimination** (Best-of-3)
**DreamMax Girls**	**2**
Rising Rage	1

**Upper Bracket** (Best-of-3)
**ONIC Pertiwi**	**2**
FUT Esports	0
**Lower Bracket** (Best-of-3)
**FUT Esports**	**2**
DreamMax Girls	0

**Qualified**
**ONIC Pertiwi**
**FUT Esports**

=== Knockout Stage ===
Quarterfinals (Bo3)
**Team Vitality**	**2**
FUT Esports	0
**Team Liquid PH**	**2**
Twisted Minds Orchid	0
Natus Vincere PH	0
**Gaimin Gladiators**	**2**
ONIC Pertiwi	1
**Terror Queens**	**2**

Semifinals (Bo5)
**Team Vitality**	**3**
Team Liquid PH	0
**Gaimin Gladiators**	**3**
Terror Queens	1

Grand Finals (Bo7)
**Team Vitality**	**4**
Gaimin Gladiators	0
Third Place Match (Bo5)
Team Liquid PH	0
**Terror Queens**	**3**

=== MWI Final Standings ===
Region/Team	Group Stage				Q	Knockout Stage				Final Placement	Win Rate	Prize Pool Allocation	EWC Club Points
Region/Team	Round 1		Round 2		Q	QF	SF	BT	GF	Final Placement	Win Rate	Prize Pool Allocation	EWC Club Points
Region/Team	UBS	LBS	UBS	LBS	Q	QF	SF	BT	GF	Final Placement	Win Rate	Prize Pool Allocation	EWC Club Points
Team Vitality	2–0	—	2–0	—	Q	2–0	3–0	—	**4–0**	**Champions**	**1.000**	US$150,000	1,000
Gaimin Gladiators	0–2	2–1	—	2–1	Q	2–0	3–1	—	**0–4**	**First Runner-Up**	.500	US$90,000	750
Terror Queens	2–0	—	1–2	2–0	Q	2–1	1-3	**3–0**		**Second Runner-Up**	.647	US$50,000	500
Team Liquid	2–0	—	2–1	—	Q	2–0	0-3	**0–3**		**Third Runner-Up**	.462	US$30,000	300
ONIC Pertiwi	2–0	—	2–0	—	Q	**1–2**				5th–8th	.714	US$20,000	200
Natus Vincere PH	2–0	—	2–1	—	Q	**0–2**				5th–8th	.571	US$20,000	200
FUT Esports	2–0	—	0–2	2–0	Q	**0–2**				5th–8th	.500	US$20,000	200
Twisted Minds Orchid	0–2	2–1	—	2–0	Q	**0–2**				5th–8th	.444	US$20,000	200
Natus Vincere MY	2–0	—	1–2	**1–2**	E					9th–12th	.500	US$15,000	0
Falcons Vega MENA	2–0	—	0–2	**0–2**	E					9th–12th	.500	US$15,000	0
DreamMax Girls	0–2	2–1	—	**0–2**	E					9th–12th	.286	US$15,000	0
Virtus.pro FE	0–2	2–0	—	**0–2**	E					9th–12th	.333	US$15,000	0
Rising Rage	0–2	**1–2**			E					13th–16th	.200	US$10,000	0
Tidal Legends Gaming	0–2	**1–2**			E					13th–16th	.200	US$10,000	0
WAOW GG Esports	0–2	**1–2**			E					13th–16th	.200	US$10,000	0
CFU Serendipity	0–2	**0–2**			E					13th–16th	.000	US$10,000	0

== See also ==
- Esports World Cup
- 2025 Esports World Cup
- MSC 2024
- Mobile Legends: Bang Bang Women's Invitational
