= 1win =

Online bookmaker and gambling platform

- Type: Private
- Industry: Online gambling and gaming
- Founded: 2016; 10 years ago
- Headquarters: Willemstad, Curaçao
- Area served: Worldwide
- Services: Online crypto-casino, betting and gambling
- Website: 1win.com

1win is an online bookmaker and gambling platform founded in 2016 and registered in Willemstad, Curaçao. It offers sports betting and online casino services. The company operates in countries of Eastern Europe, Africa, Latin America, and Asia.

== Services and operations ==
1win runs online sports betting and casino gaming, including bookmaker services processed through its website and associated online payment. It operates in multiple countries, with activities and ties to Russia, Ukraine, Belarus, Nigeria, Mexico, and South Africa, among others.

In Kazakhstan, access to the 1win platform is blocked and authorities are investigating its operations.

In Russia, the service is blocked as an unlicensed bookmaker and functions via mirror domains.

== Criminal investigation ==
In 2023, Kazakhstan authorities opened an investigation into the online casino and bookmaker services provided through the 1win platform, stating that the site accepted payments through internet acquiring without user authentication, and that minors could take part. The site was blocked in the country, and the organizers were placed on an international wanted list as part of the case.

Kazakhstan's Agency for Financial Monitoring reported that four suspected organizers were placed on an international wanted list, and a pre-trial seizure was imposed against their personal vehicles and financial assets in 2024. Criminal income was estimated at ₸3.8 billion.

After the start of the investigation in Kazakhstan, the platform's activity drew attention in Ukraine, where it was operating without a license.

== Data breach ==
In November 2024, the 1win platform suffered a data breach in which attackers copied data for roughly 96-100 million users, including email addresses, telephone numbers, IP addresses, countries, geolocation, dates of birth and passwords hashed with SHA-256. The dataset was later added to the Have I Been Pwned? database.

Following extortion demands that escalated to US$15 million during negotiations, portions of the stolen databases were posted on underground forums in early November 2024.

== Public relations initiatives ==
=== Charity projects ===
1win claims to conduct community and charity projects in Africa, Asia, and Latin America. Since 2024, 1win Charity has reported running programs such as free health-screening camps in Nigeria, holiday support for cancer patients at Korle-Bu Teaching Hospital in Ghana, and plastic-recycling programs and Holi celebrations in India. In partnership with its brand ambassador Canelo Álvarez, 1win has publicized charitable sport equipment donations in Mexico City and Guadalajara. During the 2026 Chilean wildfires, 1win announced that it had supplied emergency kits for relief efforts in the Ñuble region of Chile, in partnership with brand ambassador Andrés Campos.

=== Sponsorships ===
Since 2024, 1win has signed brand ambassador sponsorships with athletes and performers, including boxer Canelo Álvarez, MMA fighters Jon Jones and Ilia Topuria, cricketer David Warner, olympic wrestling champion Gable Stevenson, and adult performer Johnny Sins. In 2026, the company began a publicity campaign with American rapper Tyga.

=== Esports and Dota 2 ===
1win operates esports teams and sponsors events through its 1win Esports division. In Counter-Strike 2, the organization signed Timur "buster" Tulepov and Sanzhar "neaLaN" Ishkakov, joining Vladislav "lattykk" Vydrin, Boris "Ryujin" Kim, and Rassim "Jyo" Valiev.

In 2024–2025, roster changes included the departures of Dmitry "Fishman" Polishchuk and Alexander "Cloud" Zakharov ahead of FISSURE Universe: Episode 4.

In 2024, 1win Esports held three US$100,000 editions of the 1win Series Dota 2: Spring (won by Entity), Summer (won by Team Spirit), and Fall (won by Team Liquid). The organization also hosted a shorter event, the 1win Series Dota 2 Punch, which was won by Chimera Esports.

In June 2026, the company has signed an entire Tundra Esports Dota 2 roster (Pure, bzm, 33, Ari, and Whitemon) to transfer under 1win Esports, along with the team management and coach.

=== Rosters ===
1win rosters

Counter-Strike 2
Handle	Name	Nationality
ArtFr0st	Kharitonov, Artem	Russia
Ax1Le	Rykhtorov, Sergey	Russia
BELCHONOKK	Yasinskiy, Andrey	Russia
fame	Bolyshev, Petr	Russia
nafany	Gorshkov, Vladislav	Russia

Dota 2
Handle	Name	Nationality
Pure	Moskalenko, Ivan	Russia
bzm	Bogdanov, Bozhidar	Bulgaria
33	Shapira, Neta	Israel
Ari	Walker, Matthew	United Kingdom
Whitemon	Filemon, Matthew	Indonesia

Legend:
- (I) Inactive
- (S) Suspended
- (L) On loan
- (2W) Two-way player
- Substitute
- (injured) Injury / Illness
