= Sh1ro =

Russian professional Counter-Strike player

sh1ro

Personal information
- Name: Dmitry Sokolov
- Born: 14 July 2001 (age 25)
- Nationality: Russian

Current team
- Team: Spirit
- Role: AWPer
- Game: Counter-Strike 2

Team history
- 2018: team7
- 2018: FLuffy Gangsters
- 2018: Vyalie Pitoni
- 2019-2020: Gambit Youngsters
- 2020-2022: Gambit
- 2022: Players (Gambit)
- 2022-2023: Cloud9
- 2023-present: Spirit

Career highlights and awards
- 1x CS2 Major champion (Shanghai 2024); 4x HLTV Top 20 Player of the Year (2021–2024); 4x HLTV MVP

Dmitry Sokolov, better known as sh1ro, is a professional Counter-Strike 2 player currently playing for Team Spirit. Sokolov played in 6 Counter-Strike Majors, winning the 2024 Perfect World Shanghai Major against FaZe 2-1.

== Early life ==
Sokolov first started playing Counter Strike at the age of 5 after his uncle introduced the game to him. He played Counter Strike 1.6 until he switched to CS:GO in 2013.

== Career ==
=== 2018 ===
Sokolov's first professional team was one he assembled himself, called team7, in hopes to win online qualifiers. After qualifying and making it to the finals of the Russian e-Sports Championship, the entire roster was signed by FLuffy Gangsters. The team went on to win the grand finals and get an invite to closed qualifiers for the FACEIT Major, however they proceeded to lose all three matches to qualify, which resulted in the team splitting up.

=== 2019 ===
After playing in a bootcamp organized by Gambit, Sokolov was invited to join their first youth squad for Counter-Strike, Gambit Youngsters. They went on to win a $60,000 tournament, MSI MGA 2019 Finals, where sh1ro top fragged the final game with a 1.93 HLTV rating.

=== 2020 ===
After Gambit suspended their active lineup in May 2019, they promoted Gambit Youngsters to the main roster in October 2020. In November, the new Gambit roster went on to win their first tournament: DreamHack Open November 2020, beating Spirit 3-1. Sokolov top fragged that game dropping 73 kills across four maps with a 1.45 HLTV rating.

=== 2021 ===
Sokolov received his first MVP at IEM Katowice 2021, where Gambit beat G2, NaVi, Spirit, and Virtus Pro to win the tournament. Sh1ro was rated #4 on the top 20 players of 2021 according to HLTV, with an average rating of 1.24.

=== 2022 ===
Due to the invasion of Ukraine, the two main Russian eSports organizations, Gambit and Virtus Pro, both had to play under different names as they were banned from ESL and PGL tournaments. Gambit decided to put their main roster on sale in March, and one month later, Cloud9 picked up the entire team. Under this new organization, Sokolov and his team went on to win IEM Dallas, where his teammate Ax1le received the MVP. Despite this being the only tournament the roster would win this year, Sokolov was rated #3 on the top 20 players of 2022 by HLTV.

=== 2023 ===
After getting no notable results for most of 2022 and 2023, Sokolov decided to step down from the main roster of Cloud9 to look for another organization to join. In December, sh1ro joined Team Spirit, who had just won BetBoom Dacha 2023 after the recent arrival of donk. He was rated 8th best player on the HLTV top 20 players of 2023.

=== 2024 ===
Sokolov started the year winning IEM Katowice 2024, with donk receiving the MVP. Spirit proceeded to win the Blast Premier: Spring Final, and BetBoom Dacha Begrade 2024. They finished the year by winning the Shanghai Major, going undefeated in the group stage and playoffs. They beat FaZe in the finals 2-1, with sh1ro only putting up a 0.85 rating in the grand finals. Sh1ro was ranked #6 on the top 20 players of 2024 by HLTV, with his teammate donk getting #1.

=== 2025 ===
Team Spirit won 2 events in the first half of 2025: BLAST Bounty 2025 Season 1, and PGL Astana. Coming off of winning Astana, Sokolov and his team went into the Austin Major winning every match in the group stage. However, in the quarterfinals, Spirit was upset by MOUZ, losing 1-2, with Sokolov getting a 0.86 HLTV rating in that match. In the second half of 2025, right after the major, Spirit won IEM Cologne and BLAST Bounty 2025 Season 2 back-to-back. Sh1ro was ranked #5 by HLTV for the year of 2025.

== Notable Tournament Results ==
Bold denotes a Counter-Strike Major.

Year	Place	Tournament	Team	Winning Score	Opponent	Prize Money	Awards	Ref
2025	1st	BLAST Bounty Fall 2025	Spirit	3:0	TheMongolz	$287,812.50		
2025	1st	IEM Cologne 2025	Spirit	3:0	MOUZ	$400,000		
2025	1st	PGL Astana 2025	Spirit	3:1	Astralis	$200,000		
2025	1st	BLAST Bounty Spring 2025	Spirit	3:1	Eternal Fire	$288,125		
2024	1st	**Perfect World Shanghai Major 2024**	Spirit	2:1	FaZe	$500,000		
2024	1st	BetBoom Dacha Belgrade 2024 #2	Spirit	3:0	Eternal Fire	$250,000		
2024	1st	BLAST Premier: Spring Final 2024	Spirit	3:1	Natus Vincere	$200,000		
2024	1st	IEM Katowice 2024	Spirit	3:0	FaZe	$400,000		
2022	1st	IEM Dallas 2022	Cloud9	3:0	ENCE	$100,000		
2021	1st	BLAST Premier: Spring Finals 2021	Gambit	2:0	Natus Vincere	$225,000		
2021	1st	IEM XV - World Championship	Gambit	3:1	Virtus Pro	$400,000		
