= Team Spirit (esports) =

European esports organization

- Divisions: Chess; Counter-Strike 2; Dota 2; Hearthstone; Mobile Legends: Bang Bang; PUBG Mobile
- Founded: 2015; 11 years ago
- Location: Belgrade, Serbia
- Colors: White, Black, Grey
- CEO: Nikita "Cheshir" Chukalin
- Partners: Nike; Red Bull; BetBoom; Secretlab
- Website: teamspirit.gg

Team Spirit is a European esports organization based in Belgrade, Serbia. Founded in 2015, the organization currently has teams competing in Counter-Strike 2, Dota 2, Hearthstone, Pubg Mobile and Mobile Legends: Bang Bang. Their Dota 2 squad won three iterations of The International (2021, 2023, 2026), with the organization after winning their first title receiving the largest single prize money payout in esports history at $18 million. In 2022, as a result of the ongoing Russian invasion of Ukraine, the organization relocated from Moscow, Russia to Belgrade, Serbia.

== Divisions ==
=== Chess ===
In April 2025, the organization signed Grandmaster's Daniil Dubov and Vladislav Artemiev, who will represent Team Spirit during the Champions Chess Tour 2025 and the chess event at the 2025 Esports World Cup.

=== Counter-Strike 2 ===
The team had a successful season in 2024, defeating FaZe Clan 3–0 in the grand finals of IEM Katowice 2024 in February, giving them direct qualification for the year's IEM Cologne, Blast Premier World Final and the 2024 Esports World Cup. In June, the team defeated Natus Vincere 3–1 in the grand final of BLAST Premier Spring Final 2024. To end the season, Team Spirit won the BetBoom Dacha 2024 event after sweeping Eternal Fire 3–0 in the grand finals, and defeated FaZe Clan 2–1 to win the Perfect World Shanghai Major 2024, claiming the organization's first Counter-Strike Major Championship.

During the 2025 season, the team placed second at IEM Katowice 2025 after losing 3–0 to Team Vitality in the final, and defeated Astralis 3–1 in the final of PGL Astana 2025. In July, longtime member Boris "magixx" Vorobyev was replaced by Ivan "zweih" Gogin after the conclusion of the Blast Austin Major 2025. The team found instant success after defeating MOUZ 3–0 in the final of IEM Cologne 2025. Despite winning the Blast Bounty Season 2 event in August, the organization went through another roster change a month later, with Andrey "TN1R" Tatarinovich joining from Heroic to replace Myroslav "zont1x" Plakhotia. The team participated in the StarLadder Budapest Major 2025, where the team qualified for the playoffs after finishing with a 3–0 record in the third swiss stage. In the semifinals of the playoffs, they were eliminated by the defending and eventual Major champion Team Vitality with a 2–0 scoreline. After the roster's unsuccessful spell at the Budapest Major, the organization brought back magixx and zont1x to replace zweih and longtime member Leonid "chopper" Vishnyakov for the 2026 season.

The team notably made it to the finals of IEM Rio 2026, where they lost to Team Vitality in a 3–0 defeat. They eventually picked up their first major tournament win ahead of the IEM Cologne Major 2026, defeating Team Falcons in the finals of PGL Astana 2026 with a 3–0 scoreline. The team defeated G2 Esports to make it to the semifinals of the Cologne Major, but failed to make the finals of the event after losing to eventual champions Team Falcons. Despite the setback, the team went on to win two consecutive events, the Counter-Strike 2 event at the Esports World Cup 2026 and the Blast Porto Open 2026. Before the start of the PGL Major Singapore 2026, the team faced off against FURIA in the finals of Blast Premier Rivals Hong Kong, where they lost with a 3–0 scoreline.

==== Roster ====
Team Spirit CS2 roster
Players
Coaches

Handle	Name	Nationality
magixx	Vorobyev, Boris	Russia
donk	Kryshkovets, Danil	Russia
zont1x	Plakhotia, Myroslav	Ukraine
sh1ro	Sokolov, Dmitry	Russia
TN1R	Tatarinovich, Andrey	Belarus

Head coach

Sergey "hally" Shavaev

Assistant coach(es)

Dmitriy "S0tF1k" Forostyanko

Legend:
- (I) Inactive
- (S) Suspended
- Substitute
- (injured) Injury / Illness

Latest roster transaction: 6 November 2026.

=== Dota 2 ===
==== Foundation and early success (2020–2021) ====
In December 2020, the team signed the roster of Yellow Submarine, composed of players Illya "Yatoro" Mulyarchuk, Alexander "TORONTOTOKYO" Khertek, Magomed "Collapse" Khalilov and Yaroslav "Miposhka" Naidenov, with Miroslaw "Mira" Kolpakov later joining the roster ahead of the Eastern European qualifiers for The International 2021. There, the roster defeated Team Empire 3–2 in a close series to qualify for the main event.

At the main event, the roster secured a place in the upper bracket after going 10–6 in the group stage, where they were set to face Invictus Gaming. There, the team lost the series 2–1 to drop down to the lower bracket, where the team made a miraculous run to the finals after notably defeating the two-time defending champions OG, Virtus.pro, the team that had sent them down to the lower bracket Invictus Gaming, and Team Secret to face off against PSG.LGD in the grand finals. In the final, Team Spirit won the first two games, but lost the next two games in quick fashion. Needing another win to avoid losing the series and being reverse-swept, Team Spirit subsequently won game five, making them International champions and winning them a total of US$18,208,300, the largest purse ever awarded in esports. With this win, they were the first Eastern European team to win an International since Natus Vincere in the inaugural International in 2011. To commemorate their win, the team also made an appearance on Valve's True Sight documentary series.

==== Restructuring and second International victory (2022–2023) ====
The team continued their strong form into the 2022 season after facing off against in a series of rematches against PSG.LGD. The first of two rematches led to the team winning the PGL Arlington Major with a 3–1 score, while the team took a second-place finish at the inaugural Riyadh Masters after losing the final 2–0. The team ultimately secured a direct invite to The International 2022 by finishing in the top 12 of that season's Dota Pro Circuit, where despite being touted as favorites to win the event, the team placed 13th–16th at the event after losing to Boom Esports in a shocking upset.

Heading into the 2023 season, the organisation announced the departure of TORONTOTOKYO, with Denis "Larl" Sigitov replacing him on the roster. The roster found success midway into the season, after defeating Team Liquid 3–1 in the grand finals of the 2023 Riyadh Masters, receiving US$5,000,000 for winning the tournament. The team later won their second consecutive tournament, defeating Shopify Rebellion in the DreamLeague Season 21 grand finals. That same year, Team Spirit defeated Gaimin Gladiators in the Grand Finals of The International 2023, making them the first team since OG to become repeat champions of an International.

==== Restructuring and relative success (2024–2025) ====
After a string of poor results in the early part of the 2024 season, Team Spirit defeated Xtreme Gaming 3–2 in the final of PGL Wallachia Season 1 and defeated 9Pandas in the final of the 1win Series Dota 2 Summer tournament. The organization was one of six teams to receive a direct invite to The International 2024. Albeit, the roster were unable to defend their title, losing to Xtreme Gaming and placing 9th–12th at the event. The team underwent significant changes in September 2024, with Yatoro and Mira departing the roster to take a break from the professional scene. To replace them, the team signed Alan "Satanic" Gallyamov and Aleksandr "Rue" Filin from their academy team, whilst Abdimalik "Malik" Sailau was signed to stand-in for Collapse until the end of the year. In February 2025, Mira departed from the organization after signing with Aurora Gaming.

With Yatoro, Collapse and Rue retained for the 2025 season alongside Larl and Miposhka, the team found relative success after defeating Tundra Esports 3–2 in the final of DreamLeague Season 25, and placing second at ESL One Raleigh, losing to Parivision 3–1 in the final. In May 2025, the organization received a direct invite to The International 2025 due to their results earlier in the season. The roster picked up further success ahead of The International, notably defeating Team Falcons 3–0 in the grand final of the Dota 2 event at the Esports World Cup 2025 to win the grand prize of US$1,000,000. Despite their strong form going into The International 2025, the team failed to qualify for the main event after losing to Team Falcons 2–0 in the elimination round.

==== Further roster changes and third International victory (2025–present) ====
In October 2025, Nikita "panto" Balaganin was acquired from Aurora Gaming as a replacement for Miposhka, with the latter opting to take a break from the professional scene. Despite the team securing second place finishes at PGL Wallachia Season 6 and at DreamLeague Season 27, Balaganin's stint on the roster was ultimately short lived, as he was sent on loan to MOUZ after Alexey "not me" Kosmynin was signed to replace him in the lineup. With Miposhka later joining the coaching staff ahead of The International 2026, Kosmynin and the remaining core (Yatoro, Larl, Collapse and Rue) went on to win the organization's third International title, defeating Team Vision with a 3–2 scoreline. They subsequently became the first team to win three iterations of The International.

Shortly after the conclusion of The International, it was announced that Collapse would take another break from professional play, with Bohdan "Batyuk" Batiuk being brought into the team ahead of their participation in the BLAST Slam VIII event. There, the team made it to the grand final from the lower bracket, where they were defeated by Team Yandex with a 3–1 scoreline. In a rematch against Team Yandex in the final of the PARI Universe online tournament, the team went on to win the series with a 3–0 scoreline.

==== Roster ====
Team Spirit Dota 2 roster
Players
Coaches

Role	Handle	Name	Nationality
Carry	Yatoro	Mulyarchuk, Ilya	Ukraine
Midlane	Larl	Sigitov, Denis	Russia
Offlane	Batyuk	Batiuk, Bohdan	Ukraine
Support	not me	Kosmynin, Alexey	Russia
Support	rue	Filin, Aleksandr	Russia
Support	panto (I)	Balaganin, Nikita	Belarus
Offlane	Collapse (I)	Khalilov, Magomed	Russia

Head coach

Milan "MiLAN" Kozomara
Ilya "Illidan" Pivcaev

Legend:
- (I) Inactive
- (S) Suspended
- Substitute
- (injured) Injury / Illness

Latest roster transaction: 28 September 2026.

=== Mobile Legends: Bang Bang ===
==== Debut (2024) ====
In March 2024, Team Spirit would enter the MLBB esports scene in the CIS region's MLBB Continental Championships by signing Mathaios "Kid Bomba" Chatzilako, Kemiran "Sunset Lover" Kochkarov, Stanislav "SAWO" Reshniak, and Anton "Hiko" Pak from Deus Vult, thus acquiring their spot, as well as free agents Sergey "Marl" Finashev and Bogdan "Solist" Bolotin. Qualifying to the 2024 MLBB Mid Season Cup, they finished in 9th-12th Place. Marl and Solist depart from the team, with Alexander "ONESHOT" Sharkov replacing the former. The team soon qualified for the M6 World Championship, finishing in 4th, their best finish in the event so far, after losing to Selangor Red Giants in the lower bracket semifinals.

==== Improvements and first MSC Championship (2025–2026) ====
In 2025, Team Spirit won their regional championship, thus qualifying for the 2025 MLBB Mid Season Cup. In the event, they managed to reach the playoffs and finished at 5th-8th place after losing to M6 Champions ONIC Philippines. They wood soon qualify for M7 World Championship in 2026, where they finished at 5th-6th place after losing to Alter Ego in the lower bracket quarterfinals.

A month after the event, ONESHOT departs from the team, with Zaur "zaur egoist" Magomadov to replace him. They would subsequently qualify for the 2026 MLBB Mid Season Cup, where they reached the Grand Finals and defeated Yangon Galacticos in a best of seven series, 4-3, to win the organization's first MLBB trophy and become the first team outside Asia to win the event.

==== Roster ====
Team Spirit MLBB roster
Players
Coaches

Role	Handle	Name	Nationality
EXP Lane	Kid Bomba	Chatzilakos, Mathaios	Germany
Jungle	zaur egoist	Magomadov, Zaur	Russia
Middle	Sunset Lover	Kochkarov, Kemiran	Russia
Gold Lane	HIKO	Pak, Anton	Russia
Roamer	SAWO	Reshnyak, Stanislav	Russia

Head coach

Coldstar Nikita Morozov

Assistant coach(es)

Ooops Nazar Kislov
Harmonysoul Anastasia Tsai

Legend:
- (I) Inactive
- (S) Suspended
- Substitute
- (injured) Injury / Illness

Latest roster transaction: 7 March 2024.

=== PUBG-MOBILE ===
==== Roster ====
Team Spirit Pubg Mobile roster
Players
Coaches

Handle	Name	Nationality
Effect	Bekniiaz, Rysaliev	Kyrgyzstan
Kitsuné	Sergey, Pomerantsev	Russia
Knowme	Bulat, Sharafutdinov	Russia
Naómi	Anatolii, Ivanov	Russia

Head coach

Aliev Ruslan

Legend:
- (I) Inactive
- (S) Suspended
- Substitute
- (injured) Injury / Illness

Latest roster transaction: 26 February 2024.

Awards and achievements
Preceded by The International 2020; OG	The International winner 2021; With: Yatoro, TORONTOTOKYO, Collapse, Mira, Miposhka	Succeeded by The International 2022; Tundra Esports
Preceded by The International 2022; Tundra Esports	The International winner 2023; With: Yatoro, Larl, Collapse, Mira, Miposhka	Succeeded by The International 2024; Team Liquid
Preceded by PGL CS2 Major Copenhagen 2024; Natus Vincere	Perfect World Shanghai Major 2024 winner 2024; With: donk, chopper, sh1ro, zont1x, magixx	Succeeded by BLAST Austin Major 2025; Team Vitality
Preceded by 2025 MLBB Mid Season Cup; Team Liquid PH	Mobile Legends: Bang Bang Mid Season Cup winner 2026; With: Kid Bomba, zaur egoist, SAWO, Sunset Lover, Hiko	Succeeded by 2027 MLBB Mid Season Cup; Current champions
Preceded by The International 2025; Team Falcons	The International winner 2026; With: Yatoro, Larl, Collapse, rue, not me	Succeeded by The International 2027; Current champions
