= The International 2025 =

14th edition of The International

Tournament information
- Game: Dota 2
- Location: Hamburg, Germany
- Dates: September 4–14, 2025
- Administrator: Valve
- Format: The Road to The International; Swiss-system; Main event; Double Elimination
- Venue: Barclays Arena
- Participants: 16 teams
- Prize pool: US$2,881,791
- Website: dota2.com/esports/ti14

Final positions
- Champion: Team Falcons
- 1st runner-up: Xtreme Gaming
- 2nd runner-up: PARIVISION

The International 2025, commonly referred to as TI 14 or TI 2025, was the 14th edition of The International, the annual Dota 2 world championship organized by Valve, the game's developer. The group stage and corresponding elimination rounds were held online from September 4 to 7, while the playoffs took place at the Barclays Arena in Hamburg, Germany, from September 11 to 14, 2025. This marked the first time since the inaugural event in 2011 that Germany has hosted the championship. It was also the first iteration since 2017 in which no new hero was revealed. Team Falcons won the event after beating Xtreme Gaming 3–2 in the final.

== Format ==
As in previous years, the tournament was split into two phases: The Road to The International and the main event, The International.

The Road to The International was held online from September 4 to 7 and consisted of a group stage followed by an elimination round. The group stage employed a Swiss-system format, with all matches played as best-of-three series. The top three teams from this stage advanced directly to the main event. Teams placing 4th through 13th moved on to the elimination round, while the remaining teams were eliminated. In the elimination round, ten teams competed in five best-of-three matches. The winners of these matches qualified for the main event, while the losers were eliminated.

The main event was held at the Barclays Arena in Hamburg, Germany from September 11 to 14. It followed a double-elimination format, with all matches played as best-of-three series, except for the grand final, which was a best-of-five match.

== Participating teams ==
In May 2025, Valve revealed the eight teams that received direct invitations to The International 2025, stating that those teams had "risen above the rest". The Open Qualifiers were conducted online from May 31 to June 5, followed by the Regional Qualifiers, held online from June 4 to 17, which determined the remaining eight participating teams. On August 22, Valve announced that Gaimin Gladiators, one of the directly invited teams, would not be attending the event due to "internal matters between the players and the organization". Yakutou Brothers were subsequently named as the replacement for Gaimin Gladiators. In September, after the conclusion of the tournament, Gaimin Gladiators filed a C$7.5 million lawsuit against four of the players, who were no longer part of the team at that time.

Direct invitation

- Team Liquid
- PARIVISION
- BetBoom Team
- Team Tidebound
- Yakutou Brothers (replacing Gaimin Gladiators)
- Team Spirit
- Team Falcons
- Tundra Esports

Regional qualifier winners

- NAVI Junior (Western Europe)
- Nigma Galaxy (Western Europe)
- Aurora Gaming (Eastern Europe)
- Team Nemesis (Southeast Asia)
- BOOM Esports (Southeast Asia)
- Xtreme Gaming (China)
- Wildcard (North America)
- HEROIC (South America)

== Playoffs ==
Upper round 1	Upper round 2	Upper final	Final
Xtreme Gaming	2
Tundra Esports	0
Xtreme Gaming	0
PARIVISION	2
PARIVISION	2
HEROIC	0
PARIVISION	1
Team Falcons	2
Team Tidebound	0
Team Falcons	2
Team Falcons	2
BB Team	1
BB Team	2
Nigma Galaxy	1	Team Falcons	3
Xtreme Gaming	2
Lower round 1	Lower round 2	Lower round 3	Lower final
BB Team	2
Tundra Esports	0	HEROIC	1	PARIVISION	1
HEROIC	2	BB Team	0	Xtreme Gaming	2
Xtreme Gaming	2
Xtreme Gaming	2
Team Tidebound	0	Nigma Galaxy	0
Nigma Galaxy	2
