= MPL Indonesia =

Regional E-sports tournament that held in Indonesia

- Game: Mobile Legends: Bang Bang
- Founded: 2018
- Administrator: Moonton; Mineski Indonesia
- No. of teams: Season 1-2: 10; Season 3: 12; Season 4-11: 8 Season 12-18: 9
- Country: Indonesia
- Venues: Regular season Revival Studio (S1-S2); Mineski Studio (S3); MPL Arena (S4-S18) Playoffs; Mall Taman Anggrek (S1); JX Centre (S2); The BritAma Arena (S3, S12 ) Gelora Bung Karno Sports Complex (S4); MPL Arena (S5-S7, S9); Sofitel Bali Nusa Dua Hotel (S8); Jakarta International Expo (S10-S11); Jakarta International Velodrome (S13, S15, S17); Eldorado Dome (S14); Nusantara International Convention Exhibition PIK 2 (S16); Jatim Expo (S18)
- Most recent champion: Bigetron by Vitality (2nd title) (Season 18)
- Most titles: ONIC Esports (8th title)
- Sponsors: Samsung, Telkomsel, Gopay, Dunia Games, Good Day Coffee, Good Time Biscuits, Head & Shoulders, Sukro, UBS Gold, Royals Guards, Yoritos, Imajinari
- International cups: Mobile Legends: Bang Bang Mid Season Cup; Mobile Legends: Bang Bang World Championship
- Related competitions: Mobile Legends: Bang Bang Development League
- Tournament format: Regular season Double Round Robin; Playoffs; Double Elimination
- Website: id-mpl.com

The Mobile Legends: Bang Bang Professional League Indonesia, better known as MPL Indonesia or MPL-ID, is a regional professional esports league for the game Mobile Legends: Bang Bang in Indonesia. MPL-ID serves as the direct qualifying tournament for Indonesian teams for the Mobile Legends: Bang Bang Mid Season Cup (MSC) and the Mobile Legends: Bang Bang World Championship (M World).

Since its inaugural season in 2018, six teams have been crowned Champions among the 30 teams that have participated in MPL Indonesia. These are Team NXL, RRQ Hoshi, ONIC Esports, EVOS Legends, Team Liquid ID and Bigetron by Vitality.

MPL Indonesia is split into two seasons per year, once during the summer and once during the latter months of the year. MPL Indonesia, along with MPL Philippines, is a franchise-based league, meaning the nine teams that compete in each season, are franchises that are legally able to compete in MPL Indonesia tournaments. MPL Indonesia also has a lower-league for developing players named MDL Indonesia, wherein the same nine franchise teams have their own respective MDL teams.

== History ==
The first MPL Indonesia tournament was held in 2018 at the Revival Studio where the first regular season was held. Venues changed as the tournament had gained massive popularity within the Indonesian community. Some of the most-prominent teams in Mobile Legends have competed since Season 1 such as RRQ and EVOS.

During the COVID-19 pandemic, MPL Indonesia Season 5, so did other regions such as the Philippines and Malaysia, cancelled its in-person attendance for the tournament and followed an offline format to ensure the safety of the fans and the people working on set. All regions slowly opened up at the beginning of MPL Season 9.

=== Season 1 (2018) ===
MPL Indonesia hosted the first tournament with 10 qualifying teams slated to compete. These teams are RRQ.O2 (Now RRQ Hoshi), Louvre Esports, Team Rev Indo, EVOS Legends, Team NXL, Bigetron Player Kill (Now Bigetron Alpha), Pandora Esports, Domino's Hunters, Saints Indo 2 and Elite 8 Critical Reborn. Being considered a dark-horse team, Team NXL was able to win the first season of MPL Indonesia, defeating EVOS Legends 3–2.

=== Season 2 (2018) ===
The second season was held during the latter part of 2018. The second season featured a new set of teams such as SFI Esports, Team Capcorn, Boom JR, ONIC Esports and Aerowolf Roxy with teams such as RRQ.O2, EVOS, Bigetron Esports and Louvre Esports returning. However, Despite beating Team NXL 3–2, EVOS Legends once again finished second to the eventual champions RRQ.O2, defeating EVOS in a 3–0 sweep.

=== Season 3 (2019) ===
The third season of MPL Indonesia was highlighted to be an event where the champions and the runner-up teams would qualify to represent Indonesia to the Mobile Legends: Bang Bang Southeast Asia Cup of 2019, better known as MSC 2019. ONIC Esports was able to defeat Louvre Esports in the Grand Finals after ONIC finished an undefeated run in the regular season, going 11-0 (22–4). After a dominant showing in MPL Indonesia, ONIC Esports was also able to clinch the MSC 2019 title in Manila.

=== Season 4 (2019) ===
MPL Indonesia Season 4 was the first tournament in MPL Indonesia history to implement a franchise-based system, removing all qualifying tournaments to qualify for MPL.

==== Regular season ====
Pos	Team	Pld	W	L	MF	MA	MD	Pts	Qualification
1	q – EVOS Esports	14	11	3	23	9	+14	14	Upper-Bracket Semifinals
2	q – RRQ Hoshi	14	10	4	22	13	+9	9	Upper-Bracket Semifinals
3	q – Alter Ego	14	10	4	21	15	+6	6	Upper-Bracket Quarterfinals
4	q – AURA Fire	14	7	7	17	16	+1	1	Upper-Bracket Quarterfinals
5	q – ONIC Esports	14	6	8	14	16	−2	−2	Upper-Bracket Quarterfinals
6	q – Bigetron Esports	14	6	8	16	18	−2	−2	Upper-Bracket Quarterfinals
7	e – Geek Fam ID	14	3	11	11	23	−12	−12	Eliminated from the Playoffs
8	e – Aerowolf Pro Team	14	3	11	11	25	−14	−14	Eliminated from the Playoffs

Source: MPL official website
Rules for classification: Head-to-head record, number of winning games, match length of victories, tiebreaker game
e – Eliminated; q – Qualified for the phase indicated

==== Playoff bracket ====
Upper-Bracket Quarterfinals
4	AURA Fire	0
5	ONIC Esports	2
3	Alter Ego	2
6	Bigetron Esports	1

Upper-Bracket Semifinals
1	EVOS Legends	2
5	ONIC Esports	1
2	RRQ Hoshi	2
3	Alter Ego	1
Lower-Bracket Semifinals
5	ONIC Esports	0
3	Alter Ego	2

Upper-Bracket Finals
1	EVOS Legends	2
2	RRQ Hoshi	0
Lower-Bracket Finals
2	RRQ Hoshi	2
3	Alter Ego	0

Grand Finals
1	EVOS Legends	3
2	RRQ Hoshi	1

The fourth season of MPL Indonesia determined Indonesia's representatives for the first Mobile Legends: Bang Bang World Championship, better known as the M1 World Championship, which was held in Kuala Lumpur. Longtime rival teams EVOS Legends and RRQ Hoshi led the regular season before securing their place as Indonesia's representative in the upcoming World Championship, with EVOS Legends taking the MPL Indonesia Season 4 championship title.

==== M1 World Championship ====
RRQ Hoshi and EVOS Legends met again in the Grand Finals of the M1 World Championships. EVOS Legends won the upper-bracket finals, while RRQ Hoshi advanced from the lower bracket. After a seven-game series, EVOS Legends won the inaugural M1 World Championship title.

=== Season 5 (2020) ===
MPL Indonesia Season 5 was the first season of MPL Indonesia to be played under the restrictions of the COVID-19 pandemic, which forced the tournament to transition to an entirely online format. Despite the challenges posed by the global crisis, the league successfully adapted, maintaining competitive integrity and high viewership throughout the season.

==== Regular season ====
Pos	Team	Pld	W	L	MF	MA	MD	Pts	Qualification
1	q – RRQ Hoshi	14	11	3	22	8	+14	14	Upper-Bracket Semifinals
2	q – Bigetron Alpha	14	11	3	22	8	+14	14	Upper-Bracket Semifinals
3	q – EVOS Legends	14	9	5	20	13	+7	7	Upper-Bracket Quarterfinals
4	q – Alter Ego	14	7	7	16	18	−2	−2	Upper-Bracket Quarterfinals
5	q – ONIC Esports	14	6	8	17	19	−2	−2	Upper-Bracket Quarterfinals
6	q – Aerowolf Pro Team	14	5	9	17	21	−4	−4	Upper-Bracket Quarterfinals
7	e – AURA Fire	14	4	10	13	22	−9	−9	Eliminated from the Playoffs
8	e – Geek Fam ID	14	3	11	7	25	−18	−18	Eliminated from the Playoffs

Source: MPL official website
Rules for classification: Head-to-head record, number of winning games, match length of victories, tiebreaker game
e – Eliminated; q – Qualified for the phase indicated

==== Playoff bracket ====
Upper-Bracket Quarterfinals
4	Alter Ego	1
5	ONIC Esports	2
3	EVOS Legends	2
6	Aerowolf	0

Upper-Bracket Semifinals
1	RRQ Hoshi	2
5	ONIC Esports	0
2	Bigetron Alpha	1
3	EVOS Legends	2
Lower-Bracket Semifinals
5	ONIC Esports	2
2	Bigetron Alpha	0

Upper-Bracket Finals
1	RRQ Hoshi	2
3	EVOS Legends	1
Lower-Bracket Finals
2	EVOS Legends	2
5	ONIC Esports	0

Grand Finals
1	RRQ Hoshi	3
3	EVOS Legends	2

The regular season saw fierce competition among Indonesia's top teams with RRQ Hoshi and Bigetron Alpha emerging as the frontrunners, both finishing with an impressive 11–3 record and a +14 game difference. The playoffs continued the intense competition, with RRQ Hoshi, Bigetron Alpha, and EVOS Legends as the top contenders for the championship. After several closely contested matches, RRQ Hoshi and EVOS Legends once again met in the Grand Finals, setting up a highly anticipated rematch of the MPL Indonesia Season 4 Finals. Despite EVOS Legends' determination to defend their title, RRQ Hoshi ultimately clinched the championship with a narrow 3–2 victory.

==== Mobile Legends: Bang Bang Southeast Asia Cup 2020 ====
RRQ Hoshi and EVOS Legends were Indonesia's representative for MSC 2020. However, due to the COVID-19 pandemic, the tournament was cancelled.

=== Season 6 (2020) ===
MPL Indonesia Season 6 was the second season in MPL Indonesia to be played during the COVID-19 pandemic.

==== Regular season ====
Pos	Team	Pld	W	L	MF	MA	MD	Pts	Qualification
1	q – Alter Ego	14	11	3	24	10	+14	14	Upper-Bracket Semifinals
2	q – RRQ Hoshi	14	10	4	22	11	+11	11	Upper-Bracket Semifinals
3	q – ONIC Esports	14	10	4	21	12	+9	9	Upper-Bracket Quarterfinals
4	q – Bigetron Alpha	14	8	6	19	16	+3	3	Upper-Bracket Quarterfinals
5	q – Aerowolf Pro Team	14	7	7	17	17	0	0	Upper-Bracket Quarterfinals
6	q – EVOS Legends	14	7	7	15	16	−1	−1	Upper-Bracket Quarterfinals
7	e – Geek Fam ID	14	2	12	9	26	−17	−17	Eliminated from the Playoffs
8	e – AURA Fire	14	1	13	7	26	−19	−19	Eliminated from the Playoffs

Source: MPL official website
Rules for classification: Head-to-head record, number of winning games, match length of victories, tiebreaker game
e – Eliminated; q – Qualified for the phase indicated

==== Playoff bracket ====
Upper-Bracket Quarterfinals
4	Bigetron Alpha	2
5	Aerowolf	0
3	ONIC Esports	2
6	EVOS Legends	1

Upper-Bracket Semifinals
1	Alter Ego	1
4	Bigetron Alpha	2
2	RRQ Hoshi	2
3	ONIC Esports	1
Lower-Bracket Semifinals
3	ONIC Esports	1
1	Alter Ego	2

Upper-Bracket Finals
1	Bigetron Alpha	0
3	RRQ Hoshi	2
Lower-Bracket Finals
4	Bigetron Alpha	2
1	Alter Ego	2

Grand Finals
2	RRQ Hoshi	3
1	Alter Ego	2

This season saw Alter Ego and RRQ Hoshi finish as the first and second seed of the regular season with an 11-3 and 10–4 record respectively. Both Alter Ego and RRQ Hoshi met again in the Grand Finals of MPL Indonesia Season 6 after an intense playoff bracket. Despite Alter Ego's dominant regular season performance, RRQ Hoshi proved their resilience and emerged victorious with a 3–2 victory, securing the MPL Indonesia Season 6 championship title and becoming the first team in MPL Indonesia history to achieve a back-to-back championship title run.

==== M2 World Championship ====
Both RRQ Hoshi and Alter Ego Esports secured their spots at the M2 World Championship in Singapore, despite the tournament facing delays due to the COVID-19 pandemic. However, their championship hopes were cut short, as neither team reached the Grand Finals. Instead, Bren Esports of the Philippines triumphed over Burmese Ghouls, the Myanmar representatives, to claim the Philippines’ first-ever Mobile Legends World Championship title.

=== Season 7 (2021) ===
MPL Indonesia Season 7 featured the final appearance of the Aerowolf Pro Team who will subsequently fold its team and roster in Season 8.

==== Regular season ====
Pos	Team	Pld	W	L	MF	MA	MD	Pts	Qualification
1	q – ONIC Esports	14	11	3	22	10	+12	12	Upper-Bracket Semifinals
2	q – EVOS Legends	14	9	5	22	14	+8	8	Upper-Bracket Semifinals
3	q – RRQ Hoshi	14	9	5	20	12	+8	8	Upper-Bracket Quarterfinals
4	q – Bigetron Alpha	14	9	5	19	16	+3	3	Upper-Bracket Quarterfinals
5	q – Alter Ego	14	7	7	16	14	+2	2	Upper-Bracket Quarterfinals
6	q – Aerowolf Pro Team	14	7	7	17	17	0	0	Upper-Bracket Quarterfinals
7	e – Geek Fam ID	14	4	10	13	22	−9	−9	Eliminated from the Playoffs
8	e – AURA Fire	14	0	14	4	28	−24	−24	Eliminated from the Playoffs

Source: MPL official website
Rules for classification: Head-to-head record, number of winning games, match length of victories, tiebreaker game
e – Eliminated; q – Qualified for the phase indicated

==== Playoff bracket ====
Upper-Bracket Quarterfinals
4	Bigetron Alpha	2
5	Alter Ego	1
3	RRQ Hoshi	1
6	Aerowolf	2

Upper-Bracket Semifinals
1	ONIC Esports	1
4	Bigetron Alpha	2
2	EVOS Legends	2
6	Aerowolf	1
Lower-Bracket Semifinals
1	ONIC Esports	0
6	Aerowolf	2

Upper-Bracket Finals
4	Bigetron Alpha	2
2	EVOS Legends	1
Lower-Bracket Finals
2	EVOS Legends	2
6	Aerowolf	0

Grand Finals
4	Bigetron Alpha	2
2	EVOS Legends	4

ONIC Esports dominated the MPL Indonesia Season 7 regular season, finishing as the top seed with an 11–3 record and an impressive +12 game difference. They were followed by EVOS Legends and RRQ Hoshi, both having a 9–5 record. Despite their dominance, ONIC Esports did not perform in the playoffs, losing to Bigetron Alpha and Aerowolf. RRQ Hoshi was also unexpectedly eliminated in the early stages of the playoffs, breaking their chance to attain a never-done-before three-peat in MPL Indonesia.

The championship match of MPL Indonesia Season 7 was contested between EVOS Legends and Bigetron Alpha. EVOS Legends won the Grand Finals 4–2, securing the season's championship title.

==== Mobile Legends: Bang Bang Southeast Asia Cup 2021 ====
The two finalists, EVOS Legends and Bigetron Alpha, not only fought for the championship but also secured their spots as Indonesia's representatives for MSC 2021. Despite garnering support to be the favorites to win the tournament, EVOS Legends and Bigetron Alpha were unable to pull off significant victories against rising regions such as the Philippines, Cambodia and Malaysia. This came after Bigetron Alpha suffered a 0-3 standing finish in the group stages, but EVOS maintained a 2–0 lead. Both EVOS and Bigetron were eliminated from attaining the MSC 2021 Cup. An All-Philippine Grand Finals ensued, with Execration (now Smart Omega) winning against MPL-PH S7's champions Blacklist International.

=== Season 8 (2021) ===
MPL Indonesia Season 8 saw the qualifications for the champions and runner-up for the MLBB M3 World Championships. It was also the first tournament where all teams in MPL Indonesia were able to qualify for the first MPL Invitational.

==== Regular season ====
Pos	Team	Pld	W	L	MF	MA	MD	Pts	Qualification
1	q – ONIC Esports	14	11	3	24	11	+13	13	Upper-Bracket Semifinals
2	q – RRQ Hoshi	14	10	4	22	9	+13	13	Upper-Bracket Semifinals
3	q – Alter Ego	14	10	4	21	14	+7	7	Upper-Bracket Quarterfinals
4	q – EVOS Legends	14	8	6	18	14	+4	4	Upper-Bracket Quarterfinals
5	q – AURA Fire	14	7	7	18	17	+1	1	Upper-Bracket Quarterfinals
6	q – Bigetron Alpha	14	6	8	16	19	−3	−3	Upper-Bracket Quarterfinals
7	e – Geek Fam ID	14	3	11	9	24	−15	−15	Eliminated from the Playoffs
8	e – Rebellion Esports	14	1	13	7	27	−20	−20	Eliminated from the Playoffs

Source: MPL official website
Rules for classification: Head-to-head record, number of winning games, match length of victories, tiebreaker game
e – Eliminated; q – Qualified for the phase indicated

==== Playoff bracket ====
Upper-Bracket Quarterfinals
4	EVOS Legends	3
5	AURA Fire	2
3	Alter Ego	3
6	Bigetron Alpha	1

Upper-Bracket Semifinals
1	ONIC Esports	3
4	EVOS Legends	0
2	RRQ Hoshi	3
3	Alter Ego	0
Lower-Bracket Semifinals
3	Alter Ego	2
4	EVOS Legends	3

Upper-Bracket Finals
1	ONIC Esports	1
2	RRQ Hoshi	3
Lower-Bracket Finals
1	ONIC Esports	3
4	EVOS Legends	2

Grand Finals
2	RRQ Hoshi	3
1	ONIC Esports	4

The Season 8 regular season concluded with ONIC Esports and RRQ Hoshi finishing at the top of the standings, both tied with 13 points and securing direct spots in the upper-bracket semifinals. Alter Ego followed closely in third place with a strong 10–4 record. Despite having upset finishes in the recent seasons, ONIC Esports was able to pull off a fierce 7-game-series Grand Finals win against RRQ Hoshi, giving ONIC its second MPL Indonesia title. ONIC was the third team to attain such a feat.

==== M3 World Championship ====
Both ONIC and RRQ qualified for the M3 World Championships. However, ONIC Esports defeated MPL Philippines Season 8 Champions, and back-to-back champions Blacklist International to a 3–1 series in the MPL Invitational 2021. Despite the victory, ONIC Esports was eliminated earlier than usual in the lower-bracket matchup against Blacklist International, who was defeated in a 3–2 series against BloodThirstyKings (BTK). Blacklist sent ONIC Esports home in a 2–1 victory. RRQ Hoshi suffered the same fate in the lower brackets, getting eliminated by Blacklist International in a 3–0 series in the lower-bracket quarterfinals. M3 highlighted the Indonesian team's worst performance in the world stages thus far.

=== Season 9 (2022) ===
MPL Indonesia Season 9 was the first edition of the tournament that saw in-person attendance in the MPL Arena where the regular season and playoffs were held. Season 9, however, did not allow fans to attend during Weeks 1 and 2 due to health protocols provided by the Indonesian Government.

==== Regular season ====
Pos	Team	Pld	W	L	MF	MA	MD	Pts	Qualification
1	q – RRQ Hoshi	14	12	2	25	8	+17	17	Upper-Bracket Semifinals
2	q – ONIC Esports	14	11	3	22	8	+14	14	Upper-Bracket Semifinals
3	q – AURA Fire	14	9	5	20	12	+8	8	Upper-Bracket Quarterfinals
4	q – EVOS Legends	14	8	6	18	17	+1	1	Upper-Bracket Quarterfinals
5	q – Alter Ego	14	6	8	17	17	0	0	Upper-Bracket Quarterfinals
6	q – Bigetron Alpha	14	6	8	14	19	−5	−5	Upper-Bracket Quarterfinals
7	e – Rebellion Zion	14	4	10	12	20	−8	−8	Eliminated from the Playoffs
8	e – Geek Fam ID	14	0	14	1	28	−27	−27	Eliminated from the Playoffs

Source: MPL official website
Rules for classification: Head-to-head record, number of winning games, match length of victories, tiebreaker game
e – Eliminated; q – Qualified for the phase indicated

==== Playoff bracket ====
Upper-Bracket Quarterfinals
4	EVOS Legends	3
5	Alter Ego	2
3	AURA Fire	3
6	Bigetron Alpha	2

Upper-Bracket Semifinals
1	RRQ Hoshi	3
4	EVOS Legends	2
2	ONIC Esports	3
3	Aura Fire	1
Lower-Bracket Semifinals
2	Aura Fire	3
5	EVOS Legends	1

Upper-Bracket Finals
1	RRQ Hoshi	3
2	ONIC Esports	2
Lower-Bracket Finals
2	ONIC Esports	3
5	Aura Fire	2

Grand Finals
1	RRQ Hoshi	4
2	ONIC Esports	1

In Season 9, defending champions ONIC Esports reached the Grand Finals in an attempt to repeat their MPL title. They were defeated by RRQ Hoshi, who won their fourth MPL Indonesia Championship, making them the first team to achieve this milestone.

==== Mobile Legends: Bang Bang Southeast Asia Cup 2022 ====
RRQ and ONIC again represented Indonesia in the MSC 2022 Cup tournament in Kuala Lumpur, the first regional tournament to be held with an attendance of fans. ONIC was unable to qualify to the playoffs after a poor showing during the group stages. However, RRQ beat all odds to dominate its Group along with the Philippines' powerhouse team Smart Omega. RRQ Hoshi qualified for the Grand Finals in the upper bracket, defeating MPL Philippines Season 9 champions RSG Philippines, but were defeated once again by RSG in the Grand Finals in a 4–0 sweep.

=== Season 10 (2022) ===
MPL Indonesia Season 10 marked the league's first significant influx of players from the Philippines. After finishing as runner-up at the M3 World Championships, ONIC Philippines released several players who went on to compete internationally. In Season 10, many Indonesian teams adapted their play styles to align more closely with the Filipino approach, reflecting the Philippines' strong performance in major international Mobile Legends tournaments.

Philippine players and coaches who transferred to Indonesia
Player name	IGN	Lane	Former team	Former region	New team	Ref.
Kairi Rayosdelsol	Kairi	Jungle	ONIC Philippines	Philippines	ONIC Esports	
Denver Miranda	Coach Yeb	Coach	ONIC Philippines	Philippines	ONIC Esports	
Allen Baloy	Baloyskie	Roamer	ONIC Philippines	Philippines	Geek Fam	
Mark Capacio	Markyyyy	Gold Lane	ONIC Philippines	Philippines	Bigetron Alpha	
Gerald Trinchera	Dlarskie	Exp Lane	ONIC Philippines	Philippines	EVOS Esports	
Jaymark Lazaro	Janaaqt	Jungle	ECHO Philippines	Philippines	Geek Fam	
Michael Bocado	Arcadia	Coach	ECHO Philippines	Philippines	RRQ	

==== Regular season ====
Pos	Team	Pld	W	L	MF	MA	MD	Pts	Qualification
1	q – ONIC Esports	14	11	3	25	13	+12	12	Upper-Bracket Semifinals
2	q – RRQ Hoshi	14	9	5	18	14	+4	4	Upper-Bracket Semifinals
3	q – Alter Ego	14	7	7	18	17	+1	1	Upper-Bracket Quarterfinals
4	q – Bigetron Alpha	14	7	7	17	18	−1	−1	Upper-Bracket Quarterfinals
5	q – Rebellion Zion	14	6	8	16	18	−2	−2	Upper-Bracket Quarterfinals
6	q – AURA Fire	14	6	8	17	20	−3	−3	Upper-Bracket Quarterfinals
7	e – EVOS Legends	14	5	9	14	19	−5	−5	Eliminated from the Playoffs
8	e – Geek Fam ID	14	5	9	15	21	−6	−6	Eliminated from the Playoffs

Source: MPL official website
Rules for classification: Series, Games Diff, H2H, Games Win%
e – Eliminated; q – Qualified for the phase indicated

==== Playoff bracket ====
Upper-Bracket Quarterfinals
4	Bigetron Alpha	3
5	Rebellion Zion	0
3	Alter Ego	2
6	AURA Fire	3

Upper-Bracket Semifinals
1	ONIC Esports	3
4	Bigetron Alpha	1
2	RRQ Hoshi	3
6	Aura Fire	2
Lower-Bracket Semifinals
4	Bigetron Alpha	0
6	Aura Fire	3

Upper-Bracket Finals
1	ONIC Esports	1
2	RRQ Hoshi	3
Lower-Bracket Finals
1	ONIC Esports	3
6	Aura Fire	0

Grand Finals
2	RRQ Hoshi	1
1	ONIC Esports	4

ONIC Esports topped the regular season with an impressive 11–3 record and a +12 game differential, securing a direct slot into the Upper-Bracket Semifinals alongside RRQ Hoshi. RRQ Hoshi and ONIC Esports once again met in the MPL Indonesia Grand Finals for the third consecutive season. The trilogy of both RRQ and ONIC finished with ONIC Esports defeating RRQ Hoshi 4–1 in the Grand Finals, with Kairi taking Finals MVP honors.

==== M4 World Championship ====
Both RRQ and ONIC again represented Indonesia in the upcoming MLBB M4 World Championships in Jakarta. RRQ Hoshi and ONIC Esports finished 3rd and 4th in the tournament.

=== Season 11 (2023) ===
In Season 11, ONIC Esports continued their dominance in MPL Indonesia. They topped the regular season with a 13–1 record. In the playoffs, ONIC swept EVOS Legends 3–0 in the upper-bracket semifinals, defeated Alter Ego 3–0 in the upper-bracket finals, and clinched the championship by sweeping EVOS Legends 4–0 in the Grand Finals. This victory marked ONIC's fourth MPL Indonesia title.

==== Regular season ====
Pos	Team	Pld	W	L	MF	MA	MD	Pts	Qualification
1	q – ONIC	14	13	1	27	8	+19	19	Upper-Bracket Semifinals
2	q – Rex Regum Qeon	14	9	5	22	15	+7	7	Upper-Bracket Semifinals
3	q – Bigetron Alpha	14	8	6	19	15	+4	4	Upper-Bracket Quarterfinals
4	q – Geek Slate	14	8	6	20	17	+3	3	Upper-Bracket Quarterfinals
5	q – EVOS Legends	14	7	7	18	17	+1	1	Upper-Bracket Quarterfinals
6	q – Alter Ego	14	6	8	18	25	−7	−7	Upper-Bracket Quarterfinals
7	e – Rebellion Zion	14	4	10	11	22	−11	−11	Eliminated from the Playoffs
8	e – AURA Fire	14	1	13	10	26	−16	−16	Eliminated from the Playoffs

Source: MPL official website
Rules for classification: Matches W-L, Matches%, Games W-L, Games%, Games Diff, H2H
e – Eliminated; q – Qualified for the phase indicated

==== Playoff bracket ====
Play-ins
4	Geek Slate	2
5	EVOS Legends	3
3	Bigetron Alpha	2
6	Alter Ego	3

Upper-Bracket Semifinals
1	ONIC	3
5	EVOS Legends	0
2	RRQ Hoshi	1
6	Alter Ego	3
Lower-Bracket Semifinals
2	RRQ Hoshi	2
5	EVOS Legends	3

Upper-Bracket Finals
1	ONIC	3
6	Alter Ego	0
Lower-Bracket Finals
6	Alter Ego	2
5	EVOS Legends	3

Grand Finals
1	ONIC	4
5	EVOS Legends	0

==== Mobile Legends: Bang Bang Southeast Asia Cup 2023 ====
Both ONIC Esports and EVOS Legends qualified to represent Indonesia in the Mobile Legends: Bang Bang Southeast Asia Cup 2023. ONIC Esports won the tournament, defeating Blacklist International 4–2 in the Grand Finals. This feat made history, as ONIC became the first team to win the competition twice.

=== Season 12 (2023) ===
MPL Indonesia Season 12 introduced an expansion from eight to nine teams, with the addition of Dewa United Esports. This marked a significant growth in the league as competition intensified among Indonesia's best Mobile Legends teams.

==== Regular season ====
Pos	Team	Pld	W	L	MF	MA	MD	Pts	Qualification
1	q – ONIC	16	13	3	27	9	+18	18	Upper-Bracket Semifinals
2	q – Rex Regum Qeon	16	11	5	24	16	+8	8	Upper-Bracket Semifinals
3	q – Geek Fam ID	16	10	6	22	16	+6	6	Upper-Bracket Quarterfinals
4	q – Bigetron Alpha	16	7	9	17	20	−3	−3	Upper-Bracket Quarterfinals
5	q – Rebellion Zion	16	7	9	17	21	−4	−4	Upper-Bracket Quarterfinals
6	q – Dewa United Esports	16	7	9	17	22	−5	−5	Upper-Bracket Quarterfinals
7	e – EVOS Legends	16	6	10	17	22	−5	−5	Eliminated from the Playoffs
8	e – Alter Ego	16	6	10	17	23	−6	−6	Eliminated from the Playoffs
9	e – AURA Fire	16	5	11	14	23	−9	−9	Eliminated from the Playoffs

Source: MPL official website
Rules for classification: Matches Win, Match%, Games%, H2H
e – Eliminated; q – Qualified for the phase indicated

==== Playoff bracket ====
Play-ins
4	Bigetron Alpha	3
5	Rebellion Zion	0
3	Geek Fam ID	3
6	Dewa United	1

Upper-Bracket Semifinals
1	ONIC	3
4	Bigetron Alpha	2
2	RRQ Hoshi	2
3	Geek Fam ID	3
Lower-Bracket Semifinals
2	RRQ Hoshi	0
4	Bigetron Alpha	3

Upper-Bracket Finals
1	ONIC	3
3	Geek Fam ID	2
Lower-Bracket Finals
3	Geek Fam ID	3
4	Bigetron Alpha	2

Grand Finals
1	ONIC	4
3	Geek Fam ID	2

ONIC Esports continued their dominance, finishing the regular season at the top with a 13–3 record. In the playoffs, they faced stiff competition but managed to prevail. ONIC narrowly defeated Bigetron Alpha 3–2 in the upper-bracket semifinals, followed by another intense 3–2 victory over Geek Fam ID in the upper-bracket finals. In the Grand Finals, ONIC secured their historic three-peat championship run, winning their fifth MPL Indonesia title by defeating Geek Fam ID 4–2.

==== M5 World Championship ====
With this victory, ONIC Esports and Geek Fam ID became Indonesia's representatives for the MLBB M5 World Championship. ONIC had a strong run in the tournament and made it to the Grand Finals, but ultimately finished as the runners-up of the M5 World Championship.

=== Season 13 (2024) ===
MPL Indonesia Season 13 introduced a new era of partnership teams, with ONIC Esports partnering with Fnatic to form Fnatic ONIC, while AURA Esports joined forces with Team Liquid to become AURA Liquid.

==== Regular season ====
Pos	Team	Pld	W	L	MF	MA	MD	Pts	Qualification
1	q – Bigetron Alpha	16	13	3	28	9	+19	19	Upper-Bracket Semifinals
2	q – Fnatic ONIC	16	11	5	25	16	+9	9	Upper-Bracket Semifinals
3	q – Geek Fam ID	16	10	6	22	20	+2	2	Upper-Bracket Quarterfinals
4	q – Liquid Aura	16	8	8	21	18	+3	3	Upper-Bracket Quarterfinals
5	q – EVOS Glory	16	8	8	20	23	−3	−3	Upper-Bracket Quarterfinals
6	q – RRQ Hoshi	16	7	9	18	22	−4	−6	Upper-Bracket Quarterfinals
7	e – Rebellion Esports	16	6	10	17	24	−7	−7	Eliminated from the Playoffs
8	e – Alter Ego	16	5	11	17	24	−7	−7	Eliminated from the Playoffs
9	e – Dewa United	16	4	12	14	26	−12	−12	Eliminated from the Playoffs

Source: MPL official website
Rules for classification: number of winning games, match diff, H2H
e – Eliminated; q – Qualified for the phase indicated

==== Playoff bracket ====
Play-ins
4	Liquid AURA	0
5	EVOS Glory	3
3	Geek Fam ID	3
6	RRQ Hoshi	2

Upper-Bracket Semifinals
1	Bigetron Alpha	1
5	EVOS Glory	3
2	Fnatic ONIC	3
3	Geek Fam ID	2
Lower-Bracket Semifinals
1	Bigetron Alpha	0
3	Geek Fam ID	3

Upper-Bracket Finals
5	EVOS Glory	0
2	Fnatic ONIC	3
Lower-Bracket Finals
5	EVOS Glory	3
3	Geek Fam ID	2

Grand Finals
2	Fnatic ONIC	4
5	EVOS Glory	2

Bigetron Alpha dominated the regular season, finishing at the top of the standings with a 13–3 record. However, their playoff run ended in disappointment as they failed to secure a single victory, marking a surprising early exit. Instead, Fnatic ONIC capitalized on the opportunity and showcased their strength in the playoffs. They secured a 4–2 victory over EVOS Legends in the Grand Finals, claiming their sixth MPL Indonesia title and historic 4-peat.

==== Mobile Legends: Bang Bang Mid Season Cup 2024 ====
With this triumph, Fnatic ONIC earned their place as Indonesia's representative for the Mobile Legends Mid-Season Cup (MSC 2024) alongside EVOS Glory. However, both Indonesian teams were eliminated in the group stage.

=== Season 14 (2024) ===
MPL Indonesia Season 14 saw Liquid AURA officially rebranded as Team Liquid ID, marking their full integration into the global Team Liquid organization.

==== Regular season ====
Pos	Team	Pld	W	L	MF	MA	MD	Pts	Qualification
1	q – RRQ Hoshi	16	13	3	28	11	+17	17	Upper-Bracket Semifinals
2	q – Team Liquid ID	16	12	4	25	14	+11	11	Upper-Bracket Semifinals
3	q – Bigetron Alpha	16	11	5	26	14	+12	12	Upper-Bracket Quarterfinals
4	q – Fnatic ONIC	16	10	6	21	17	+4	4	Upper-Bracket Quarterfinals
5	q – Geek Fam ID	16	9	7	21	20	+1	1	Upper-Bracket Quarterfinals
6	q – Alter Ego	16	6	10	16	22	−6	−6	Upper-Bracket Quarterfinals
7	e – Dewa United Esports	16	5	11	16	23	−7	−7	Eliminated from the Playoffs
8	e – Rebellion Esports	16	3	13	12	27	−15	−15	Eliminated from the Playoffs
9	e – EVOS Glory	16	3	13	12	29	−17	−17	Eliminated from the Playoffs

Source: MPL official website
Rules for classification: number of winning games, match diff, H2H
e – Eliminated; q – Qualified for the phase indicated

==== Playoff bracket ====
Play-ins
4	Fnatic ONIC	2
5	Geek Fam ID	3
3	Bigetron Alpha	3
6	Alter Ego	0

Upper-Bracket Semifinals
1	RRQ Hoshi	3
5	Geek Fam ID	1
2	Team Liquid ID	3
3	Bigetron Alpha	2
Lower-Bracket Semifinals
3	Bigetron Alpha	3
5	Geek Fam ID	0

Upper-Bracket Finals
1	RRQ Hoshi	3
2	Team Liquid ID	2
Lower-Bracket Finals
2	Team Liquid ID	3
3	Bigetron Alpha	0

Grand Finals
1	RRQ Hoshi	3
2	Team Liquid ID	4

In the regular season, RRQ Hoshi led the standings with a 13–3 record, closely followed by Team Liquid ID at 12–4. Both teams dominated throughout the tournament and eventually faced off in the upper-bracket finals, where RRQ Hoshi narrowly won 3–2 to advance to the Grand Finals. However, Team Liquid ID made a strong lower-bracket run and ultimately defeated RRQ Hoshi 4–3 in the Grand Finals, securing their first-ever MPL Indonesia championship. This victory made Team Liquid ID the fifth different team to win MPL Indonesia, officially ending ONIC Esports' era of dominance.

==== M6 World Championship ====
With their performances, Team Liquid ID and RRQ Hoshi qualified as Indonesia's representatives for the MLBB M6 World Championship. In the international tournament, Team Liquid ID reached the Grand Finals but fell 4–1 to Fnatic ONIC PH, finishing as the M6 runners-up.

=== Season 15 (2025) ===
MPL Indonesia Season 15 introduced a major change as Rebellion Esports' slot was acquired by Natus Vincere (NAVI), marking the entry of the European esports powerhouse into the MPL Indonesia scene. During the regular season, another European esports powerhouse, Team Vitality, acquired Bigetron Esports and their slot, renaming the team to Bigetron by Vitality.

==== Regular season ====
Pos	Team	Pld	W	L	MF	MA	MD	Pts	Qualification
1	q – RRQ Hoshi	16	12	4	25	14	+11	11	Upper-Bracket Semifinals
2	q – Geek Fam ID	16	11	5	25	17	+8	8	Upper-Bracket Semifinals
3	q – ONIC	16	10	6	24	17	+7	7	Upper-Bracket Quarterfinals
4	q – Bigetron by Vitality	16	9	7	23	18	+5	5	Upper-Bracket Quarterfinals
5	q – Alter Ego	16	9	7	22	18	+4	4	Upper-Bracket Quarterfinals
6	q – Team Liquid ID	16	9	7	22	20	+2	2	Upper-Bracket Quarterfinals
7	e – EVOS	16	7	9	19	21	−2	−2	Eliminated from the Playoffs
8	e – Dewa United Esports	16	5	11	15	24	−9	−9	Eliminated from the Playoffs
9	e – Natus Vincere	16	0	16	6	32	−26	−26	Eliminated from the Playoffs

Source: MPL official website
Rules for classification: Matches W-L, Matches%, Games W-L, Games%, Games Diff, H2H
e – Eliminated; q – Qualified for the phase indicated

== Viewership ==
As of MPL Indonesia S18

MPL Indonesia was streamed live on Facebook Gaming, TikTok and YouTube.

Year	Season	Peak viewers	Average viewers	Hours watched	Air time	Prize pool	Reference
2018	1	98,927	18,715	547,400	29 hours	$100,000	
2018	2	N/A				$100,000	
2019	3	N/A				$120,000	
2019	4	289,460	49,766	6,067,274	122 hours	$300,000	
2020	5	825,656	123,378	18,527,223	150 hours	$300,000	
2020	6	1,387,047	162,979	29,023,734	178 hours	$300,000	
2021	7	1,838,907	319,846	54,293,857	170 hours	$300,000	
2021	8	2,392,579	447,142	76,945,678	172 hours	$300,000	
2022	9	2,845,364	442,217	82,768,110	187 hours	$300,000	
2022	10	2,384,335	440,591	80,921.722	184 hours	$300,000	
2023	11	1,888,453	357,631	73,344,128	205 hours	$300,000	
2023	12	2,100,032	520,262	116,711,888	224 hours	$336,500	
2024	13	2,225,961	464,773	110,267,346	237 hours	$336,500	
2024	14	4,008,662	512,189	117,504,669	229 hours	$336,000	
2025	15	4,132,224	488,526	113,297,159	232 hours	$298,000	
2025	16	3,110,921	460,093	101,258,657	220 hours	$298,000	
2026	17	2,948,968	487,879	105,544,347	216 hours	$298,000	
2026	18	2,533,485	336,476	75,847,121	226 hours	$298,000	

== Current teams and rosters ==
Team name	Head coach	Assistant coach	Analyst	EXP Lane	Jungler	Mid Lane	Gold Lane	Roamer
Alter Ego Esports	Kenny "Xepher"; Deo	Michael "Styx" Abraham	-	Syauki Fauzan "Nino"; Sumarno	Syahrul "Rinee"; Ramadhan Muhammad Affan "Yazukee"; Wahyudi	Dalvin Ramadhana "Hijumee"; Putra Muhammad "Cyruz" Halim	Arifudin "Arfy" Dingarai	Alexander "Alekk" Owen Vincentsius "Ivann" Adrianto
Bigetron by Vitality	Abraham "Bam" Unida	Ervan Pratama "Erpang"; Hasan	Arya "Barbossa" Al Nazhari	Dylont Ananda "Shogun"; Setya	Manuel "Nnael"; Simbolon Muhammad "Ronn" Syahron	Marcel Juan Moreno "Moreno"; Sinulingga	Eman Llanda "EMANN"; Sangco	Muhammad Arifin "Finn" Hikmatullah
Dewa United Esports	Jaypee Felipe "Right" Lugtu	"Lius Andre"	Dian "Wongcoco" Agusta	Haikal "Markk" Balad John "QINN" Carlo	Reynaldo "Reyy"; Ferdiand Muhammad Ikhsan "Vanz"; Farabi	Muhamad Akmal "Octa"; Maulana	Delvin "Maybeee"; Chua	Irfan "Muezzaa"
EVOS	Calvin "VYN"	-	Akbar "Bravo"; Tubagus	I Gusti Made Indra "Xorizo"; Dwipayana Rendy Chandra "Rendyy" Wijaya	Albert Neilsen "Alberttt"; Iskandar	Attanasius David "SwayLow" Halomoan Faiskal "RoundeL" Khadafi	Erland "Erlan"; Saputra Jabran Bagus "Branz" Wiloko	Hengky "Kyy"; Gunawan
Geek Fam ID	Derry Santiriani "Dora" Pratama	Mark Kevin Delos "Bluffzy"; Reyes	-	Mercy Richart "Gobs"; Ratuliu	Muhammad "Maykids"; Akbar	Valent Agriansyah "Aboy"; Putra	Mohammad Dwi Chandra "Caderaa"; Pambudi Kenny "KennzyySkie"; Ramadhan	Allen Jedric "Baloyskie"; Baloy
Natus Vincere	Anthony Dennis "YnoT"; Senedrin	Hafizun "Jacklee" Ahmad	H a n	Karsten "Karss"; William	Andrew Lew "Andoryuuu"; Flora Joshua Adonai Nathan "Joshuaa" Kurniawan	Muhammad "Jiizee"; Najiyullah	Budi "Zeonn"; Liunardi	Muhammad Rakha "APHRO" Sastradinata
ONIC	Adi "Adi"; Syofian Asyauri	Calvin "CW" Winata	Riyan "Gem" Febriyanto	Moch Lutfi "Lutpiii"; Ardianto	Kairi Ygnacio "Kairi"; Rayosdelsol	Gilang "SANZ"	Grant "Kelra" Pillas Scevenko David "Skylar"; Tendean	Nicky Fernando "Kiboy"; Pontonuwu
RRQ Hoshi	Alfi Syahrin "Khezcute"; Nelphyana	Fadhil "Rave" Abdurahman	Rasyid Kevin "NMM"; Perwira	Rendy "Dyrennn"; Syahputra	Arthur "Sutsujin"; Sunarkho Ferdyansyah "Ferxiic"; Kamaruddin	Hajirin "Rinz"; Arafat	Muhammad "Toyy"; Rizky	Said Ali "idok" Ridho
Team Liquid ID	Dolly "SaintDeLucaz"; Van Pelo	Muhammad "Pahlevi" Reza Pahlevi	Usep "Facehugger"; Satiawan	Aldhia Fahmi "Aran"; Aranda	Favian Bayu "Faviannn"; Putra Yonathan "JOOOO" Chin	Yehezkiel "Yehezkiel"; Wiseman	"Kyou" Leonardo Prasetyo "Kabuki" Agung	Christian Widy Wardhana "Widy"; Hartono

== Results ==
=== By season ===
As of MPL Indonesia S18

Background shading indicates that the team led that season's MPL Indonesia regular season.
Background shading indicates that the team won the Mobile Legends: Bang Bang Mid Season Cup.
Background shading indicates that the team won the Mobile Legends: Bang Bang World Championship.

Year	Edition	Champions	Runner up	3rd place	4th place	5th-6th place		Mobile Legends: Bang Bang Mid Season Cup			M World Championship	
2018	Season 1	Team NXL	EVOS Legends	RRQ.O2	Bigetron PK	Team Rev Indo	Elite 8 Critical Reborn	Team NXL	EVOS Legends	RRQ.O2	Not held	
2018	Season 2	RRQ.O2	EVOS Legends	ONIC Esports	Louvre Esports	Aerowolf Roxy	Saints Indo	Team NXL	EVOS Legends	RRQ.O2	Not held	
2019	Season 3	ONIC Esports	Louvre Esports	Aerowolf Roxy	SFI Critical	Bigetron Esports	Alter Ego	ONIC Esports		Louvre Esports	EVOS Legends	RRQ Hoshi
2019	Season 4	EVOS Legends	RRQ Hoshi	Alter Ego	ONIC Esports	Bigetron Esports	AURA Fire	ONIC Esports		Louvre Esports	EVOS Legends	RRQ Hoshi
2020	Season 5	RRQ Hoshi	EVOS Legends	ONIC Esports	Bigetron Alpha	Aerowolf Pro Team	Alter Ego	Cancelled due to COVID-19 pandemic			RRQ Hoshi	Alter Ego
2020	Season 6	RRQ Hoshi	Alter Ego	Bigetron Alpha	ONIC Esports	Aerowolf Pro Team	EVOS Legends	Cancelled due to COVID-19 pandemic			RRQ Hoshi	Alter Ego
2021	Season 7	EVOS Legends	Bigetron Alpha	Aerowolf Pro Team	ONIC Esports	RRQ Hoshi	Alter Ego	EVOS Legends		Bigetron Alpha	ONIC Esports	RRQ Hoshi
2021	Season 8	ONIC Esports	RRQ Hoshi	EVOS Legends	Alter Ego	Bigetron Alpha	AURA Fire	EVOS Legends		Bigetron Alpha	ONIC Esports	RRQ Hoshi
2022	Season 9	RRQ Hoshi	ONIC Esports	AURA Fire	EVOS Legends	Bigetron Alpha	Alter Ego	RRQ Hoshi		ONIC Esports	ONIC Esports	RRQ Hoshi
2022	Season 10	ONIC Esports	RRQ Hoshi	AURA Fire	Bigetron Alpha	Rebellion Zion	Alter Ego	RRQ Hoshi		ONIC Esports	ONIC Esports	RRQ Hoshi
2023	Season 11	ONIC Esports	EVOS Legends	Alter Ego	RRQ Hoshi	Bigetron Alpha	Geek Slate	ONIC Esports		EVOS Legends	ONIC Esports	Geek Fam ID
2023	Season 12	ONIC Esports	Geek Fam ID	Bigetron Alpha	RRQ Hoshi	Rebellion Zion	Dewa United Esports	ONIC Esports		EVOS Legends	ONIC Esports	Geek Fam ID
2024	Season 13	Fnatic ONIC	EVOS Glory	Geek Fam ID	Bigetron Alpha	RRQ Hoshi	Liquid AURA	Fnatic ONIC		EVOS Glory	RRQ Hoshi	Team Liquid ID
2024	Season 14	Team Liquid ID	RRQ Hoshi	Bigetron Alpha	Geek Fam ID	Fnatic ONIC	Alter Ego	Fnatic ONIC		EVOS Glory	RRQ Hoshi	Team Liquid ID
2025	Season 15	ONIC Esports	RRQ Hoshi	Geek Fam ID	Alter Ego	Bigetron Esports	Team Liquid ID	ONIC Esports		RRQ Hoshi	ONIC Esports	Alter Ego
2025	Season 16	ONIC Esports	Alter Ego	EVOS	Bigetron by Vitality	Dewa United Esports	Natus Vincere	ONIC Esports		RRQ Hoshi	ONIC Esports	Alter Ego
2026	Season 17	Bigetron by Vitality	ONIC Esports	Geek Fam ID	Team Liquid ID	Dewa United Esports	EVOS	Bigetron by Vitality		ONIC Esports	Bigetron by Vitality	Natus Vincere
2026	Season 18	Bigetron by Vitality	Natus Vincere	Team Liquid ID	Alter Ego	ONIC Esports	EVOS	Bigetron by Vitality		ONIC Esports	Bigetron by Vitality	Natus Vincere

=== By team ===
As of MPL Indonesia S18

Denotes that the franchise team is still active in MPL Indonesia.
Denotes that the franchise team has left MPL Indonesia.
Denotes that the team was a non-franchise team and is no longer participating in MPL Indonesia.

Team			MPL Indonesia									Moonton international competitions			Other international competitions			National team representatives		National tournaments
Team			Playoffs					Regular season				Moonton international competitions			Other international competitions			National team representatives		National tournaments
Organization	Name(s)	Duration	Champion(s)	Runners-up	Final(s)	Season(s) won	Season(s) runners-up	Leader(s)	Runners-up	Season(s) led	Season(s) runners-up	MPLI title(s)	MSC title(s)	World title(s)	ESL Challenge Finals	ESL Masters	Games of the Future	SEA Games	IESF World Championships	President's Cup
ONIC Esports	ONIC Esports	S2–S10	8	2	10	Season 3 Season 8 Season 10; Season 11; Season 12; Season 13; Season 15; Season 16	Season 9 Season 17	9	2	Season 2 Season 3 Season 7 Season 8 Season 10; Season 11; Season 12; Season 16; Season 17	Season 9, Season 13	2 (2021, 2022)	2 (2019, 2023)	0	1 (S3)	0	1 (2025)	0	0	1 (2019)
ONIC Esports	ONIC	S11–S12	8	2	10	Season 3 Season 8 Season 10; Season 11; Season 12; Season 13; Season 15; Season 16	Season 9 Season 17	9	2	Season 2 Season 3 Season 7 Season 8 Season 10; Season 11; Season 12; Season 16; Season 17	Season 9, Season 13	2 (2021, 2022)	2 (2019, 2023)	0	1 (S3)	0	1 (2025)	0	0	1 (2019)
ONIC Esports	Fnatic ONIC ID	S13–S14	8	2	10	Season 3 Season 8 Season 10; Season 11; Season 12; Season 13; Season 15; Season 16	Season 9 Season 17	9	2	Season 2 Season 3 Season 7 Season 8 Season 10; Season 11; Season 12; Season 16; Season 17	Season 9, Season 13	2 (2021, 2022)	2 (2019, 2023)	0	1 (S3)	0	1 (2025)	0	0	1 (2019)
ONIC Esports	ONIC	S15–present	8	2	10	Season 3 Season 8 Season 10; Season 11; Season 12; Season 13; Season 15; Season 16	Season 9 Season 17	9	2	Season 2 Season 3 Season 7 Season 8 Season 10; Season 11; Season 12; Season 16; Season 17	Season 9, Season 13	2 (2021, 2022)	2 (2019, 2023)	0	1 (S3)	0	1 (2025)	0	0	1 (2019)
Rex Regum Qeon	RRQ.O2	S1–S2	4	5	9	Season 2, Season 5, Season 6, Season 9	Season 4, Season 8, Season 10, Season 14, Season 15	5	6	Season 1 Season 5, Season 9, Season 14, Season 15	Season 4, Season 6, Season 8, Season 10, Season 11, Season 12	1 (2020 S1)	0	0	0	0	0	0	0	0
Rex Regum Qeon	PSG.RRQ	S3	4	5	9	Season 2, Season 5, Season 6, Season 9	Season 4, Season 8, Season 10, Season 14, Season 15	5	6	Season 1 Season 5, Season 9, Season 14, Season 15	Season 4, Season 6, Season 8, Season 10, Season 11, Season 12	1 (2020 S1)	0	0	0	0	0	0	0	0
Rex Regum Qeon	RRQ Hoshi	S4–present	4	5	9	Season 2, Season 5, Season 6, Season 9	Season 4, Season 8, Season 10, Season 14, Season 15	5	6	Season 1 Season 5, Season 9, Season 14, Season 15	Season 4, Season 6, Season 8, Season 10, Season 11, Season 12	1 (2020 S1)	0	0	0	0	0	0	0	0
EVOS Esports	EVOS Esports	S1–S3	2	5	7	Season 4, Season 7	Season 1, Season 2, Season 5, Season 11, Season 13	1	2	Season 4	Season 1, Season 7	0	0	1 (M1)	0	0	0	0	1 (2022)	0
EVOS Esports	EVOS Legends	S4–S12	2	5	7	Season 4, Season 7	Season 1, Season 2, Season 5, Season 11, Season 13	1	2	Season 4	Season 1, Season 7	0	0	1 (M1)	0	0	0	0	1 (2022)	0
EVOS Esports	EVOS Glory	S13–S14	2	5	7	Season 4, Season 7	Season 1, Season 2, Season 5, Season 11, Season 13	1	2	Season 4	Season 1, Season 7	0	0	1 (M1)	0	0	0	0	1 (2022)	0
EVOS Esports	EVOS	S15–present	2	5	7	Season 4, Season 7	Season 1, Season 2, Season 5, Season 11, Season 13	1	2	Season 4	Season 1, Season 7	0	0	1 (M1)	0	0	0	0	1 (2022)	0
Bigetron Esports; Team Vitality	Bigetron Player Kill	S1	2	1	3	Season 17, Season 18	Season 7	1	2	Season 13	Season 5, Season 16	0	0	0	0	0	1 (2026)	0	0	1 (2022)
Bigetron Esports; Team Vitality	Bigetron Esports	S2–S4	2	1	3	Season 17, Season 18	Season 7	1	2	Season 13	Season 5, Season 16	0	0	0	0	0	1 (2026)	0	0	1 (2022)
Bigetron Esports; Team Vitality	Bigetron Alpha	S5–S14	2	1	3	Season 17, Season 18	Season 7	1	2	Season 13	Season 5, Season 16	0	0	0	0	0	1 (2026)	0	0	1 (2022)
Bigetron Esports; Team Vitality	Bigetron Esports	S15	2	1	3	Season 17, Season 18	Season 7	1	2	Season 13	Season 5, Season 16	0	0	0	0	0	1 (2026)	0	0	1 (2022)
Bigetron Esports; Team Vitality	Bigetron by Vitality	S15–present	2	1	3	Season 17, Season 18	Season 7	1	2	Season 13	Season 5, Season 16	0	0	0	0	0	1 (2026)	0	0	1 (2022)
Team Liquid	Liquid AURA	S13	1	0	1	Season 14	–	1	2	Season 18	Season 14; Season 17	0	0	0	0	0	0	0	0	0
Team Liquid	Team Liquid ID	S14–present	1	0	1	Season 14	–	1	2	Season 18	Season 14; Season 17	0	0	0	0	0	0	0	0	0
Team NXL		S1	1	0	1	Season 1	–	0	0	–	–	0	0	0	0	0	0	0	0	0
Alter Ego Esports		S3–present	0	2	2	–	Season 6, Season 16	1	0	Season 6	–	1 (2020 S2)	0	0	0	0	0	0	0	0
Geek Fam	Geek Fam ID	S4–S10	0	1	1	–	Season 12	0	1	–	Season 15	0	0	0	0	0	0	0	0	0
Geek Fam	Geek Slate	S11	0	1	1	–	Season 12	0	1	–	Season 15	0	0	0	0	0	0	0	0	0
Geek Fam	Geek Fam ID	S12–present	0	1	1	–	Season 12	0	1	–	Season 15	0	0	0	0	0	0	0	0	0
Natus Vincere		S15–present	0	1	1	–	Season 18	0	1	–	Season 18	0	0	0	0	0	0	0	0	0
Louvre Esports		S1–S3	0	1	1	–	Season 3	0	0	–	–	0	0	0	0	0	0	0	0	0
Dewa United Esports		S12–present	0	0	0	–	–	0	0	–	–	0	0	0	0	0	0	0	0	0
Aura Esports	Aura Fire	S3–S12	0	0	0	–	–	0	0	–	–	0	0	0	0	0	0	0	0	2 (2021, 2023)
Aura Esports	Liquid Aura	S13	0	0	0	–	–	0	0	–	–	0	0	0	0	0	0	0	0	2 (2021, 2023)
Aerowolf Esports	Aerowolf Roxy	S2–S3	0	0	0	–	–	0	2	–	Season 2 Season 3	0	0	0	0	0	0	0	0	0
Aerowolf Esports	Aerowolf Pro Team	S4–S7	0	0	0	–	–	0	2	–	Season 2 Season 3	0	0	0	0	0	0	0	0	0
Rebellion Esports	Rebellion Esports	S8	0	0	0	–	–	0	0	–	–	0	0	0	0	0	0	0	0	0
Rebellion Esports	Rebellion Zion	S9–S12	0	0	0	–	–	0	0	–	–	0	0	0	0	0	0	0	0	0
Rebellion Esports	Rebellion Esports	S13–S14	0	0	0	–	–	0	0	–	–	0	0	0	0	0	0	0	0	0

== Player awards and achievements ==
=== Season player and coach awards ===
As of MPL Indonesia Season 18

Year	Season	Awards											
Year	Season	MVP	Team	FMVP	Team	MIP	Team	ROS	Team	RST	Team	BCT	Team
2018	Season 1	Hansen "Spade" Meyerson	Elite 8 Critical Reborn	Supriadi "Watt" Putra	Team NXL	N/A		N/A		N/A		N/A	
2018	Season 2	Try "AyamJAGO" Sukardi	RRQ.O2	Try "AyamJAGO" Sukardi	RRQ.O2	N/A		N/A		N/A		N/A	
2019	Season 3	Teguh "Psychoo" Firdaus	ONIC Esports	Muhammad "Udil" Ardiansyah	ONIC Esports	N/A		N/A		N/A		N/A	
2019	Season 4	Muhammad "Lemon" Ikhsan (1)	RRQ Hoshi	Gustian "REKT"	EVOS Legends	N/A		N/A		N/A		N/A	
2020	Season 5	Jabran "Branz" Wiloko	Bigetron Alpha	Calvin "Vyn"	RRQ Hoshi	N/A		N/A		N/A		N/A	
2020	Season 6	Muhammad "Lemon" Ikhsan (2)	RRQ Hoshi	Albert "Alberttt" Iskandar	RRQ Hoshi	Muhammad "Butsss" Sanubari	ONIC Esports	N/A		Gilang "SANZ"	ONIC Esports	N/A	
2021	Season 7	Albert "Alberttt" Iskandar (1)	RRQ Hoshi	Ihsan "Luminaire" Kusudana	EVOS Legends	Hafizhan "Clover" Mirzaputra	EVOS Legends	N/A		Ferdyansyah "Ferxiic" Kamaruddin	EVOS Legends	N/A	
2021	Season 8	Muhammad "Butsss" Sanubari	ONIC Esports	Calvin "CW" Winata (1)	ONIC Esports	Erico "god1va"	AURA Esports	N/A		Syauki "Nino" Sumarno	Alter Ego	N/A	
2022	Season 9	Albert "Alberttt" Iskandar (2)	RRQ Hoshi	Deden "Clayyy" Nurhasan	RRQ Hoshi	Leonardo "Kabuki" Agung	AURA Esports	N/A		Thomas "SamoHt" Budiman	ONIC Esports	Muhammad "Pahlevi" Pahlevi	AURA Esports
2022	Season 10	Kairi "Kairi " Rayosdelsol (1)	ONIC Esports	Kairi "Kairi " Rayosdelsol (1)	ONIC Esports	Maxwell "Maxx" Alessandro	Bigetron Alpha	N/A		Bernard "Widjanarko" Widjanarko	Rebellion Zion	Ronaldo "Aldo" Lieberth	ONIC Esports
2023	Season 11	Gilang "SANZ"	ONIC Esports	Gilang "SANZ"	ONIC Esports	Mohammad "Caderaa" Pambudi (1)	Geek Slate	N/A		Kenneth "Kenn" Marcello	Bigetron Alpha	Paul "Yeb" Miranda	ONIC Esports
2023	Season 12	Kairi "Kairi " Rayosdelsol (2)	ONIC Esports	Nicky "Kiboy" Pontonuwu	ONIC Esports	Mohammad "Caderaa" Pambudi (2)	Geek Fam ID	Manuel "Nnael" Simbolon	Geek Fam ID	Manuel "Nnael" Simbolon	Geek Fam ID	Paul "Yeb" Miranda	ONIC Esports
2024	Season 13	Eman "EMANN" Sangco	Bigetron Alpha	Calvin "CW" Winata (2)	Fnatic ONIC	Marcel "Moreno" Sinulingga	Bigetron Alpha	Gugun "Gugun" Pratama	Liquid AURA	N/A		Alfi "Khezcute" Nelphyana; Rasyid "NMM" Perwira	Bigetron Alpha
2024	Season 14	Favian "Faviannn" Putra	Team Liquid ID	Christian "Widy" Hartono	Team Liquid ID	Yehezkiel "Yehezkiel" Wiseman	Team Liquid ID	Favian "Faviannn" Putra	Team Liquid ID	N/A		Alfi "Khezcute" Nelphyana; Rasyid "NMM" Perwira	RRQ Hoshi
2025	Season 15	Said "Idok" Ridho	RRQ Hoshi	Gilang "SANZ" (2)	ONIC Esports	Syauki "Nino" Sumarno	Alter Ego	Muhammad "Maykids" Ardani	Geek Fam ID	N/A		Alfi "Khezcute" Nelphyana; Rasyid "NMM" Perwira; Fadhil "Rave" Abdurahman	RRQ Hoshi
2025	Season 16	Gilang "SANZ" (2)	ONIC Esports	Kairi "Kairi " Rayosdelsol (2)	ONIC Esports	Muhamad "Octa" Maulana"	Dewa United Esports	Dylont "Shogun" Huraihira	Bigetron by Vitality	N/A		Adi "Adi" Asyauri; Calvin "CW" Winata; Riyan "Paddington" Febriyanto	ONIC Esports
2026	Season 17	Grant "Kelra" Pillas	ONIC Esports	Marcel Juan "Moreno" Sinulingga	Bigetron by Vitality	Yonathan "Kevinn" Chin	Team Liquid ID	Andric "Drichel" Alfayyadh	Team Liquid ID	N/A		"Honjaw"; Usep "Facehugger" Satiawan	Team Liquid ID
2026	Season 18	Yonathan "Kevin" Cin	Team Liquid ID	Dylont "Shogun" Huraihira	Bigetron by Vitality	Yonathan "Kevin" Cin	Team Liquid ID	Joshua "Joshua" Kurniawan	Natus Vincere	N/A		Anthony "YnoT" Senedrin; Hafizun "Jacklee" Ahmad; Abdullah "Han" Saputra	Natus Vincere

=== Multiple awards ===
As of MPL Indonesia Season 17

Players with multiple individual awards
Player	Totals	MVP	FMVP	MIP	ROS	RST
Gilang "SANZ"	5	2	2	0	0	1
Kairi "Kairi" Rayosdelsol	4	2	2	0	0	0
Albert "Alberttt" Iskandar	3	2	1	0	0	0
Muhammad "Lemon" Ikhsan	2	2	0	0	0	0
Try "AyamJAGO" Sukardi	2	1	1	0	0	0
Muhammad "Butsss" Sanubari	2	1	0	1	0	0
Calvin "CW" Winata	2	0	2	0	0	0
Mohammad "Caderaa" Pambudi	2	0	0	2	0	0
Favian "Faviannn" Putra	2	1	0	0	1	0
Manuel "Nnael" Simbolon	2	0	0	0	1	1
Syauki "Nino" Sumarno	2	0	0	1	0	1
Marcel Juan "Moreno" Sinulingga	2	0	1	1	0	0

== International appearances ==
As of Mobile Legends: Bang Bang Mid Season Cup 2026

Background shading indicates a franchise team that is still active in MPL Indonesia.
Background shading indicates a franchise team that is no longer in MPL Indonesia.
Background shading indicates a non-franchise team that previously competed in MPL Indonesia.

Mobile Legends: Bang Bang Mid Season Cup
	2017 (2)	2018 (3)	2019 (2)	2021 (2)	2022 (2)	2023 (2)	2024 (2)	2025 (2)	2026 (2)
ONIC Esports	×	×	1st	•	GS	1st	GS	4th	3rd
RRQ Hoshi	×	3rd	•	•	2nd	•	•	PO	•
EVOS Esports	×	GS	•	3rd	•	PO	GS	•	•
Bigetron Esports	×	•	•	PO	•	•	•	•	PO
Aerowolf Esports	×	4th	•	•	×	×	×	×	×
Louvre Esports	×	•	2nd	×	×	×	×	×	×
Elite8 Esports	PO	•	×	×	×	×	×	×	×
Saints Indo	PO	•	•	×	×	×	×	×	×

Mobile Legends: Bang Bang World Championship
	2019 (2)	2020 (2)	2021 (2)	2022 (2)	2023 (2)	2024 (2)	2025 (2)	2026 (2)
EVOS Esports	1st	•	•	•	•	•	•	•
RRQ Hoshi	2nd	3rd	PO	3rd	•	PO	•	•
ONIC Esports	•	•	PO	4th	2nd	•	PO	•
Alter Ego	•	4th	•	•	•	•	2nd	•
Team Liquid	×	×	×	×	×	2nd	•	•
Geek Fam	•	•	•	•	PO	•	•	•
Bigetron by Vitality	•	•	•	•	•	•	•	Q
Natus Vincere	×	×	×	×	×	×	•	Q

Legend

- 1st – Champions
- 2nd – Runners-up
- 3rd – Third place
- 4th – Fourth place
- SF – Semi-finals
- PO – Playoffs
- PI – Play-in
- GS – Group stage
- WC – Wildcard stage
- Q – Qualified
- • – Did not qualify
- × – Did not enter / eligible
- – Hosts

== MDL Indonesia ==
The Mobile Legends Development League Indonesia, abbreviated as MDL ID or MDL Indonesia, is an official tournament organized by Moonton. It serves as the second-tier professional esports league for the game Mobile Legends: Bang Bang in Indonesia. This league acts as a platform for developing and nurturing new talents and players to advance to the Mobile Legends Professional League Indonesia.

=== By season ===
Year	Season	Grand final			Playoffs		No. of teams
Year	Season	Champions	Score	Runners-up	Semifinalist		No. of teams
2020	1	Victim Esports	3–2	Recca Esports	Siren Clan	XCN KINGS	12
2020	2	Siren Clan	3–1	RRQ Sena	ONIC Prodigy	EVOS Icon	11
2021	3	SIREN Esports	3–0	Victim Esports	KINGS Esports	EVOS Icon	14
2021	4	Alter Ego X	3–1	EVOS Icon	Bigetron Beta	AURA Esports	14
2022	5	EVOS Icon	3–1	Alter Ego X	Dewa United	AURA Esports	14
2022	6	Bigetron Beta	3–0	EVOS Icon	Dewa United	GPX	14
2023	7	EVOS Icon	4–2	Dewa United	ONIC Prodigy	OPI Pegasus	16
2023	8	TWE Bossque	4–2	RRQ Sena	ONIC Prodigy	OPI Pegasus	17
2024	9	Geek Fam ID Jr	4–3	RRQ Sena	ONIC Prodigy	Bigetron Beta	17
2024	10	RRQ Sena	4–2	Bigetron Beta	ONIC Prodigy	Pendekar Esports	16
2025	11	Alter Ego X	4–2	Diton	ONIC Prodigy	Team Liquid Academy ID	16
2025	12	Bigetron Academy	4–0	Kagendra	ONIC Prime	NAVI Junior	16
2026	13	Bigetron Academy	4–3	Geek Fam ID Jr	RRQ Sena	EVOS Icon	16
2026	14	Bigetron Academy	4–0	EVOS Icon	VL Team	NAVI Junior	16

=== By team ===
Background shading indicates a sister team of an active MPL Indonesia franchise.
Background shading indicates a sister team of a former MPL Indonesia franchise.
Background shading indicates a non-franchise team.

Teams		MDL Indonesia			Finals	
Organization	Team name	Title(s)	Runners-up	Final(s)	Seasons won	Seasons runners-up
Bigetron Esports (S1–present)	Bigetron Beta (S1-S10); Bigetron Academy (S11–present)	4	1	5	S6, S12, S13, S14	S10
EVOS Esports (S1–present)	EVOS Icon (S1–present)	2	3	5	S5, S7	S4, S6, S14
Alter Ego Esports (S1–present)	Alter Ego X (S1–present)	2	1	3	S4, S11	S5
SIREN Esports (S1-S3)	Siren Clan (S1-2); Siren Esports (S3)	2	0	2	S2, S3	-
Rex Regum Qeon (S1–present)	RRQ Sena (S1–present)	1	3	4	S10	S2, S8, S9
Victim Esports (S1-S4)	Victim Esports (S1-S4)	1	1	2	S1	S3
Geek Fam (S1–present)	Geek Fam ID Jr (S1–present)	1	1	2	S9	S13
TWE Esports (S8)	TWE Bossque (S8)	1	0	1	S8	-
Recca Esports (S1)	Recca Esports (S1)	0	1	1	-	S1
Dewa United Esports (S3–present)	Dewa United Esports (S3-S7); Dewa United Rhodes (S8-S9); Dewa United Morpheus (S10–present)	0	1	1	-	S7
Diton (S11–present)	Diton (S11–present)	0	1	1	-	S11
Kagendra (S10–present)	Kagendra (S10–present)	0	1	1	-	S12
ONIC Esports (S1–present)	ONIC Prodigy (S1-S11); ONIC Prime (S12–present)	0	0	0	-	-
Team Liquid (S10–present)	Team Liquid Academy ID (S10–present)	0	0	0	-	-
Natus Vincere (S11–present)	NAVI Junior (S11–present)	0	0	0	-	-
AURA Esports (S1-S9)	AURA Esports (S1-S5); AURA Blaze (S6-S7); AURA Esports (S8-S9)	0	0	0	-	-
Rebellion Esports (S4-S10)	Red Bull Rebellion (S4); Rebellion Sinai (S5-S8); Rebellion Blitz (S9-10)	0	0	0	-	-
Aerowolf Esports (S1-S3)	Aerowolf Jr (S1-S3)	0	0	0	-	-

== See also ==
- MPL Philippines
- MDL Philippines
- Mobile Legends: Bang Bang Championship Tour
- Mobile Legends: Bang Bang Women's Invitational
- Mobile Legends: Bang Bang Mid Season Cup
- Mobile Legends: Bang Bang World Championship
- Garudaku
