= Mobile Legends: Bang Bang Championship Tour =

Professional esports leagues

- Game: Mobile Legends: Bang Bang
- First season: January 25, 2026; 9 months ago
- Owner: Moonton
- Division: MCT AMER; MCT EA; MCT EECA; MCT MENA; MCT SEA

The Mobile Legends: Bang Bang Championship Tour (stylized as MCT and regionally stylized based on its location) is a cross-league regional competition for the Multiplayer online battle arena mobile game Mobile Legends: Bang Bang. Established in 2026, it is the official qualifying regional tournament for developing and rising regions for the MLBB ecosystem.

Announced in 2026 as part of the Esports roadmap of the game during the MLBB M7 World Championship, the MCT has five championship tour leagues: The Americas (stylized as AMER), East Asia (stylized as EA), Southeast Asia (stylized as SEA), the Middle East and Africa (stylized as EMEA), and Eastern Europe and Central Asia (stylized as EECA). As of August 9, 2026, MCT AMER and MCT EA have been the inaugural active leagues.

== History ==
Prior to the establishment of the championship tour leagues, MLBB operated on a system where professional and amateur leagues were established in regions who excel in international tournaments and where MLBB has a growing base of players. These included the establishment of the Mobile Legends: Bang Bang Professional League (MPL) in regions such as Indonesia, the Philippines, Malaysia, Singapore, and Myanmar.

The Myanmar league was discontinued due to the geopolitical tensions in Myanmar and the COVID-19 pandemic. Singapore had split from Malaysia to create two distinct leagues named in accordance with their regions, and certain tournaments were sanctioned for proper qualification routes, specifically in North America through the North America Challenger Tournament (NACT), and the establishment of MPL Brazil.

Since then, several changes prior to the MCT were made for different qualification routes for teams. In 2024, MPL Brazil was dissolved as it merged with the other MLBB sanctioned leagues in South America to form MPL LATAM, a competitive hiatus for the NACT, and subjected exclusivity due to the dominance of Southeast Asia in the game was put into question as to MLBB's global footprint and international presence.

In January 2026, prior to the Grand Finals of the M7 World Championship in Jakarta, Tiger Xu, Moonton Games' Global Head for MLBB Esports, announced the establishment of the Mobile Legends: Bang Bang Championship Tour as a blueprint for a long-term view of what the game and its esport can be. He emphasized that the transition is critical as its integration due to expansion and by bringing in several emerging regions, the market is ensured that it plays a central role in the competitive landscape.

It was introduced as an intercontinental, cross-regional tournament designed to unify the previously isolated territories that have sizeable MLBB players and communities into a larger, highly-competitive zone of tournaments. Its primary function is to "break local boundaries and elevate global gameplay."

== Leagues and format ==
In the announcement, five championship tour leagues were established and each league will have several teams and tournaments. It acts as the international qualifier for regional teams for the game's international tournaments such as the Mobile Legends: Bang Bang Mid Season Cup and the Mobile Legends: Bang Bang World Championship. In the announcement, MCT AMER, MCT EA, MCT EECA, MCT EMEA, and MCT SEA were named as the five championship tour leagues, however, MCT AMER, MCT EA, and MCT SEA will be the first three inaugural tournaments to be hosted under this format.

=== MCT AMER ===
The Mobile Legends: Bang Bang Championship Tour The Americas (MCT AMER) integrates teams from North America, Central America, Latin America, and Brazil into a unified circuit of tournaments that serves as these teams' international qualification path to the aforementioned tournaments.

The inaugural season held in 2026 featured sixteen teams: eight from North America and eight from South America. Central American teams were grouped in the North Group while all South American teams including Brazil were grouped in the South Group. Both eight-team groups played a Swiss Stage Seeding tournament where the top two teams from each group earned a direct bye in the upper bracket semifinals for their groups. The other teams were then seeded accordingly to their seeds: Seeds 3 and 4 were given byes during the upper bracket quarterfinals and teams Seeded 5 through 8 were drawn to match each other in the first round. All rounds apart from the grand finals of each group were best-of-fives while the grand finals were best-of-sevens.

The winner of the finals in each group would face the champions of the other group in a final best-of-seven tournament. South America's Entity7 won the inaugural MCT AMER Split 1 title in six games after defeating North America's Alpha7 North. The tournament was held online.

North Group		South Group	
Region	Team name	Region	Team name
Canada	The Night Horde	Argentina	9Z Globant
Colombia	Influence Rage Origins	Argentina	Influence Rage
Dominican Republic	Stamina Esports	Brazil	Alpha7
Mexico	Lyon	Brazil	DreamMax
Mexico	U2	Chile	Black Sentence
United States	Alpha7 North	Peru	Entity7
United States	Leviathan	Peru	Infinity
United States	Vendetta	Peru	Octa Gaming

=== MCT EA ===
The Mobile Legends: Bang Bang Championship Tour East Asia (MCT EA) integrates teams from China, Japan, Mongolia, and South Korea into a unified circuit of tournaments that serves as these teams' international qualification path to the aforementioned tournaments.

Prior to its debut, MCT EA partnered with Japanese-based Esports organization HERO Esports' Asian Champions League (ACL) to host MCT EA. MCT EA was then officially known as the MLBB Championship Tour EA x ACL. Unlike its sister-league MCT AMER, MCT EA acts as the regional qualifier playoff tournament for regional qualifiers as prior to the establishment of MCT EA, China and Mongolia have their own respective circuits.

Chinese teams have qualified through the MLBB China Masters (MCS) league while Mongolian teams have qualified through the ESN National Championships. Meanwhile, Japan and South Korea qualified through their own local regional qualifiers. The tournament was held offline at the Star Ring Center in Shanghai.

Region	Team name
China	Guangzhou Gaming
China	YBINGAME
Japan	Sunset Ravens
Mongolia	The MongolZ
Mongolia	The Huns Esports
South Korea	Feiyun Esports

=== MCT SEA ===
The Mobile Legends: Bang Bang Championship Tour Southeast Asia (MCT SEA) is the third championship tour circuit in the MLBB ecosystem. As announced in the M7 World Championship, MCT SEA will be hosted in Bangkok, Thailand as an offline event. It serves as a qualification pathway for four teams into the MLBB M8 World Championships in Turkey where the top two teams qualify for the main stage and the third and fourth teams qualify for wildcard. These teams include the champions of the developmental leagues of the Philippines, Indonesia, and Malaysia, alongside team representations from the Mobile Legends: Bang Bang Super League regions in Thailand, Myanmar, and the professional league representations from Cambodia, Singapore, and qualifiers from Vietnam, Brunei, Laos, and Timor-Leste.

Region	Team name
Philippines	Team Falcons Academy
Indonesia	TBD
Malaysia	SRG Academy
Thailand	Bacon Time
Thailand	Tenacity
Myanmar	Falcon Esports
Cambodia	TBD
Singapore	Evil
Vietnam	Saigon Phantom
Brunei	TBD
Laos	189 Esports
East Timor	TBD

=== Future Leagues ===
==== MCT EMEA ====
The Mobile Legends: Bang Bang Championship Tour The Middle East and North Africa (MCT EMEA) will be one of the two future league circuits for the MLBB ecosystem tapping the markets of the Middle East and Africa. Currently, the Middle East has a professional league circuit named MPL MENA.

==== MCT EECA ====
The Mobile Legends: Bang Bang Championship Tour Eastern Europe and Central Asia (MCT EECA) will be the other future league circuits for the MLBB ecosystem for Europe. Currently, Eastern Europe as the Mobile Legends: Bang Bang Continental Championship (MCC) while the rest of the European continent competes under the MLBB European Championship (MEC).

== Results ==
=== MCT AMER ===
Year	Split	Champions	Score	Runner-up	No.	Qualification	Ref.
2026	Split 1	Entity7	4–2	Alpha7 North	16	2026 MLBB Mid Season Cup	
2026	Split 2	DreamMax Esports	4–1	LYON	16	MLBB M8 World Championship	

=== MCT EA ===
Year	Split	Champions	Score	Runner-up	No.	Qualification	Ref.
2026	Split 1	Guangzhou Gaming	3–1	The MongolZ	12	2026 MLBB Mid Season Cup	
2026	Split 2	The MongolZ	5–3 (Note: The series was a Best-of-9.)	DianFengYaoGuai	12	MLBB M8 World Championship	

== See also ==
- MPL Philippines
- MDL Philippines
- MPL Indonesia
- Mobile Legends: Bang Bang World Championship
- Mobile Legends: Bang Bang Mid Season Cup
