= Telin =

Indonesian carrier services and investment company

PT. Telekomunikasi Indonesia International (Telin)
- Type: Subsidiary
- Industry: Telecommunications; Investment
- Headquarters: Telkom Landmark Tower, Tower 2, 16th & 17th floor, The Telkom Hub, Jl. Jend. Gatot Subroto kav. 52; Jakarta, Indonesia
- Brands: Telin Singapore; Telin Hong Kong; Telkomcel; Telkom Australia; Telkom Macau; Telkom Taiwan; Telin Malaysia; Telkom USA; Myanmar Branch; Business Unit in Kingdom of Saudi Arabia
- Parent: Telkom Indonesia

PT Telekomunikasi Indonesia International or Telkom International, and commonly abbreviated as Telin, is an Indonesian carrier services and investment company and is a wholly owned subsidiary of Telkom Indonesia. It is an international telecommunication business serves as Telkom's business arms in managing and developing its business lines outside Indonesia.

== Operation ==
Telin manages several subsidiaries, Telekomunikasi Indonesia International Pte. Ltd. in Singapore (Telin Singapore), Telekomunikasi Indonesia International (HongKong) Limited (Telin Hong Kong), Telekomunikasi Indonesia International (TL) S.A. (Telin Timor-Leste), Telekomunikasi Indonesia International Australia Pty. Ltd. (Telin Australia), Telkom Macau Limited (Telin Macau), Telkom Taiwan Limited (Telin Taiwan), Telekomunikasi Indonesia International (Malaysia) Sdn. Bhd (Telin Malaysia), Telekomunikasi Indonesia International (USA), Inc. (Telin USA). In addition to those subsidiaries, Telin established a branch in Myanmar and a business unit in Kingdom of Saudi Arabia. Telin existence in several footprints worldwide will serve function as Telin main gateways to international telecommunication market.

On September 9, 2013, Telin released the ownership of 29.71% shares of the Scicom (MSC) Berhad Malaysia, the largest contact centre for outsourcing service providers in Malaysia.

On September 25, 2014, Telin acquired 75% shares of Contact Centres Australia (CCA) makes it entitles as Telin Australia's subsidiary. CCA is a Sydney-based company who runs Business Process Outsourcing specifically Contact centre service for fundraising (not for profit organisation) and commercial business.

Telin provides network business, international information-telecommunication services, including the international telecommunication services for and on behalf of Telkom as well as its international telecommunication services.

Telin also owns licences for the fixed and closed network establishment in Indonesia as well as the Facility Based Operator (FBO) licence in Singapore and Unified Carrier Licence (UCL) in Hong Kong.

Aside from its footprints and products and services, Telin owns numbers of Infrastructures divided into Point of Presence (PoP), Submarine Cable Systems, and World Hub of Command Centre (WHOCC).

- Point of Presence (PoP) in 65 areas: PoP ASIA: Batam (2), Dumai, Jakarta (4), Manado, Surabaya, Dili, Hong Kong (3), Seoul, Kuala Lumpur, Naypyidaw, Singapore (4), Taipei, Tokyo. POP EUROPE & MIDDLE EAST: Amsterdam, Berlin, Dubai, Frankfurt, Kiev, London, Luxemburg, Madrid, Manchester, Marseille, Milan, Moscow, Palermo, Paris, Sofia, Stockholm, Switzerland, Vienna, Warsaw. POP USA: Ashburn, Chicago, Guam, Hawaii, Los Angeles (2), New York, Palo Alto, San Jose, Seattle, Toronto.
- Undersea Cable System namely
1. Batam Singapore Cable System (BSCS), a submarine cable system connecting Batam Centre station (Batam) to Telin station in Singapore. The total system length is around 98 km, connecting the landing sites through six fibre pair cables, with stub cable is provided for future extension of the system.
2. Dumai Malacca Cable System (DMCS), is a submarine telecommunications cable system linking Indonesia and Malaysia across the Strait of Malacca
3. Southeast –Asia Japan Cable (SJC), an 8,900-kilometre cable system, which could further extend to 9,700 kilometres.
4. America Asia Gateway (AAG), a 20,000-km, high-bandwidth fibre optic submarine cable system that will connect Southeast Asia to the United States.
5. Southeast Asia Middle East Western Europe 5 (SEA-ME-WE 5), an undersea cable system with an approximate length 20.000 km passing Southeast Asia to Europe. Status: Construction to operate in 2016.
6. Southeast Asia – United States (SEA-US), an undersea cable system with an approximate length 15.000 km directly connecting Manado, Indonesia to LA, USA. It has already operated since September 2017.
7. Indonesia Global Gateway (IGG), an undersea cable system connecting Manado and Dumai, a project collaboration between Telkom and Telin.
- World Hub of Command Centre (WHOCC) is located in Kalibata, Jakarta, Indonesia to provide various services such as Help Desk and Assistance 24/7, Network Surveillance, and Real Time Fault Handling (RTFH)s.

== See also ==
- Telkom Indonesia
