= Digiserve =

Indonesian telecommunication company

PT Telkom Solusi Indonesia
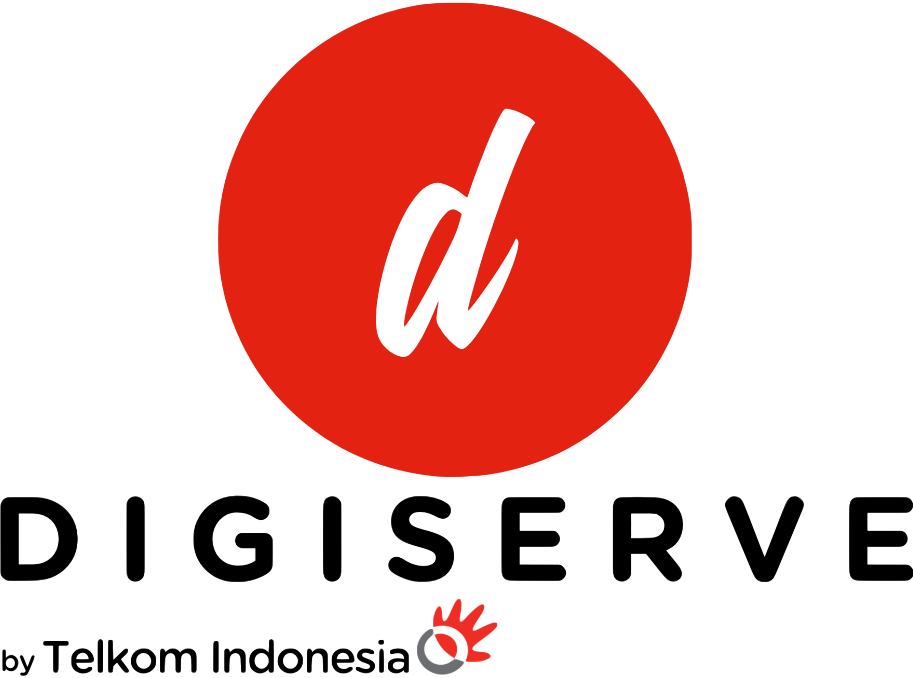
- Trade name: Digiserve (since 2021); Telkomtelstra (2014–2021)
- Formerly: PT Teltranet Aplikasi Solusi (2014–2021)
- Type: Subsidiary
- Industry: Telecommunications
- Founded: 27 October 2014; 12 years ago
- Headquarters: Jakarta, Indonesia
- Area served: Indonesia
- Key people: Hartono
- Services: Managed network services; WAN optimization; Managed cloud services; Software as a service; Infrastructure as a service; Platform as a service; Unified communication and collaboration services; Managed security services; Professional services
- Owner: Telkom Indonesia
- Number of employees: 200-500
- Parent: Telkom Indonesia
- Website: www.digiserve.co.id

PT Telkom Solusi Indonesia, also known as Digiserve by Telkom Indonesia, is a telecommunications company based in Jakarta, Indonesia. The company was previously known as Telkomtelstra (2014–2021) and PT Digital Aplikasi Solusi (2021–2026). On November 1, 2026, the acquisition of Digiserve's shares by PT Telkom Indonesia (Persero) Tbk officially took legal effect. Since then, the company has become a direct subsidiary of Telkom Indonesia and has operated under the legal entity name PT Telkom Solusi Indonesia. Digiserve is known for its services in Managed Network and Security Services (MNSS), Managed Cloud Services, and Managed Digital Productivity.

== History ==
Telkomtelstra logo from 2014 through 2021

The birth of Digiserve (then known as telkomtelstra) came from an initial meeting and MOU between two companies, Telkom Indonesia and Telstra, an Australian company. The joint venture agreement was finalized between the two companies’ parents on 29 August 2014. The idea was to select and jointly share specialised resources of the two companies in order to create a new joint venture to be the exclusive provider of network application services (NAS) to business clients in Indonesia, Southeast Asia’s largest economy.

PT Teltranet Aplikasi Solusi (telkomtelstra) was established by notarial deed No. 36 in Jakarta. The deed of establishment was approved by the Minister of Justice of the Republic of Indonesia in his decision letter No AHU-31520.40.10.2014, dated 27 October 2014. Since its foundation, it has expanded to include a range of different services, and has been awarded “the most innovative partnership award” by the IDC.

On 30 September 2021, Telkomtelstra was rebranded as Digiserve after Telkom acquired Telstra's remaining shares.

On November 1, 2026, PT Telkom Indonesia (Persero) Tbk (Telkom) acquired the shares of PT Digital Aplikasi Solusi (Digiserve) as part of its efforts to strengthen its information and communication technology (ICT) solutions business in the corporate and enterprise market. This move made Digiserve a direct subsidiary of Telkom, operating under the legal entity name PT Telkom Solusi Indonesia.

== Services ==
Digiserve provides network application services across Indonesia, and is, per its agreement, the exclusive provider of these services in the country. As of today, the services they offer include:

Managed Network Services – Digiserve provides management services for the communication networks of both multinational and domestic companies.

Managed Cloud Services - Digiserve offers on-demand services to companies via the internet from cloud systems as opposed to on-premises servers.

Software as a Service - Also known as software on demand, Digiserve hosts subscription-based software services.

Unified Communication and Collaboration - Digiserve helps companies overcome challenges by bringing all communications into one place, and providing communication services for personnel.

Managed Security Services - Services that aim to protect a company, and the sensitive information of customers from attacks and leaks.

Professional Services - Consultation services including project management and assessment.

== Awards ==
- Innovation in Events, Silver Stevie Winner, 2016
