= Telin Singapore =

Singaporean subsidiary of Telkom Indonesia International

- Type: Subsidiary of PT. Telekomunikasi Indonesia International
- Industry: Telecommunications
- Headquarters: 1 Harbourfront Place #03-12 HarbourFront Tower One, Singapore 098633
- Key people: Indarto Nata (CEO)
- Parent: PT. Telekomunikasi Indonesia International
- Website: https://www.telin.sg

Telin Singapore was incorporated on 6 December 2007 as a wholly owned subsidiary of Telkom Indonesia International. As a member of TELKOM Group, Telin's strategic focus is to provide Infocom and connectivity services from Indonesia and beyond. Telin was awarded a Facilities-Based Operator (FBO) License in May 2008 from Infocomm Development Authority of Singapore. Telin's goal is to increase the operating reach and services footprint for TELKOM Group.

In June 2015, Telin Singapore started construction of a US$115 million Telin-3 data centre in Jurong, Singapore.

In 2018, Telin Singapore partnered with Campana Group to develop internet connectivity between Myanmar and Singapore.
