= Telkomsel =

Indonesian telecommunications company

PT Telekomunikasi Selular
- Logo used since 2026 (Note: Standalone Telkomsel's logo without tagline has been in use since 18 June 2021.)

- Telkom Landmark Complex Building in Jakarta, Indonesia
- Trade name: Telkomsel
- Type: Joint venture
- Industry: Telecommunications
- Founded: 26 May 1995; 31 years ago
- Headquarters: Telkom Landmark Complex, Jakarta, Indonesia
- Key people: Diaz Hendropriyono (President Commissioner); Nugroho (President Director)
- Brands: SIMPATI; Halo; Orbit; Telkomsel One; EZnet; by.U; IndiHome
- Services: Prepaid; Postpaid; Landline telephony; Wireless and fixed internet; SMS
- Owners: Telkom Indonesia (69.9%); Singtel (30.1%)
- Website: www.telkomsel.com

PT Telekomunikasi Selular (lit. 'Cellular Telecommunications Limited'), trading as Telkomsel, is an Indonesian telecommunications company founded in 1995. Its ownership is divided between Telkom Indonesia (69.9%) and Singtel (30.1%), which serves as Telkom's consumer services arm starting 1 July 2023 by its management takeover of IndiHome. It is headquartered alongside Telkom in the Telkom Landmark Complex.

Telkomsel is the largest cellular telecommunication carrier in the country with 169.5 million customer base as of 2020. The company operates their GSM network on the 900–1800 MHz frequency range, as well as 3G, 4G, and 5G services on other frequencies. Telkomsel operates a variety of mobile services, the most prominent of which are SIMPATI (formerly Telkomsel PraBayar) and Telkomsel Halo (formerly kartuHalo). These brands differ on their payment model (prepaid vs. postpaid) and pricing. As of the first quarter of 2020, Telkomsel had a 66.4% share of the Indonesian mobile phone market.

== History ==
Former logo of Telkomsel used until 18 June 2021. The "by Telkom Indonesia" byline was added in early 2010.

Telkomsel was incorporated on 26 May 1995 in Jakarta, Indonesia by PT Telekomunikasi Indonesia Tbk (Telkom) and PT Indosat Tbk (Indosat). In 1996, KPN Netherlands (KPN) and PT Setdco Megacell Asia (Setdco) acquired stakes in Telkomsel of 17.28% and 5%, respectively. In 2001, Telkom acquired Indosat shares to increase its ownership to 77.72%, while KPN and Setdco's shares were acquired by Singtel Mobile. The following year, Singtel Mobile increased its ownership by 12.7%, bringing its total ownership in Telkomsel to 35%, while it is majority owned by Telkom Indonesia with 65% of the shares.

In November 1997, Telkomsel became the first wireless carrier in Asia to introduce rechargeable GSM pre-paid services (branded as simPATI until the 2021 rebrand). In September 2006, Telkomsel became the first carrier in the country to launch a 3G service.

On 20 March 2009, Telkomsel and Apple South Asia launched the iPhone 3G in Indonesia with customised price plans for all of Telkomsel's customers. Three years later, Telkomsel had acquired more than 100 million active customers.

In 2014, 11 million former Telkom Flexi (the parent company's fixed wireless access service) subscribers were migrated to either kartuAs or kartuHALO service (depending on their plan) when Telkom, along with various other cellular providers across the country, ended their CDMA services.

In April 2017, the company's website was hacked, and a message protesting about high charges and unnecessary extra services was posted containing numerous offensive words. There was widespread support for the hacker on social media.

Another version of Telkomsel logo in social media's profile used since 18 June 2021.

In June 2021, Telkomsel became the first carrier in the country to launch a 5G service, with limited rollout in certain regions in Jakarta, Bandung and South Tangerang, along with Batam. On 18 June 2021, Telkomsel launched its new logo, replacing the old logo that has been used 26 years since its foundation.

On 6 April 2023, Telkomsel announced its plan to merge with Telkom's broadband arm, IndiHome, into a single entity valued at 58.3 trillion rupiah. This merger means that Telkomsel will begin to expand its coverage in the fixed broadband market while preparing for the transition to a digital economy and 5G technology.

== Network coverage ==
As of 2018, Telkomsel had 160,705 Base Transceiver Stations (BTS) with 68.7% being 3G/4G capable. The network uses GSM Dual Band (900 & 1800), GPRS, EDGE, 3G, 4G, and 5G technologies.

Frequencies used on Telkomsel Network in Indonesia
Band	Frequency	Frequency Width	Protocol	Notes
8	900 MHz (880~890, 925~935)	2*10 MHz	EDGE / LTE / LTE-A	
3	1800 MHz (1765~1785, 1860~1880)	2*20 MHz	EDGE / LTE / LTE-A	
1	2100 MHz (1960~1980, 2150~2170)	2*20 MHz	LTE / LTE-A / NR	
40	2300 MHz (2300~2340)	40 MHz	LTE / LTE-A / NR	

== Brand identity ==
First Simpati logo, 1997–2021

Second KartuHalo logo, 2012–2021

Telkomsel PraBayar logo, 2021–2025

Telkomsel Halo logo, 2021–present

Simpati's second logo, after returning to using the name Simpati logo, 2025–present

=== Slogans ===
==== As Telkomsel ====
- Dari Telkomsel (From Telkomsel, 1995–present, tagline)
- Begitu Dekat Begitu Nyata (So Close So Real, 2001–2008)
- Jangkauan Terluas & Kualitas Terbaik (Most extensive Coverage & Best Quality, 2009–2014)
- Telkomsel Paling Indonesia (Telkomsel Most Indonesian, 2010–2014)
- Terluas Tercepat (Most extensive, Fastest, 2014–2021)
- Buka Semua Peluang (Open All Opportunities, 2021–2026)
- Melayani Sepenuh Hati (Serving Wholeheartedly, 2026–present; adopted from Danantara's slogan)

==== As Flexi ====
- Bukan Telepon Biasa (Not an Ordinary Phone, 2003–2010)
- Lebih Irit kan! (More economical, right!, 2010–2014)

==== As Simpati/Telkomsel PraBayar ====
- Dengan simPATI, Tetap Terkendali (With simPATI, Stay in Control, 1997–2001)
- No Problem (2001–2003)
- No Compromise, No Problem (2003–2006)
- Pilihan Jitu! (Great Choice!, 2006–2007)
- Satu Untuk 1001 Keinginan! (One For 1001 Wishes!, 2008–2009)
- Pilihan Juara! (Champion's Choice!, 2009–2010)
- Nyamannya Pakai simPATI (The Convenience of Using simPATI, 2010–2012)
- My simPATI, My Style (2012)
- Your Everyday Discoveries (2014–2021)
- Buka Semua Peluang (Open All Opportunities, 2021–2025)
- Terbaik Untukmu (Best For You, 2025–sekarang)
- Jadi Duta Simpati, Is My Duty (Being a Simpati Ambassador Is My Duty, 2025–present, sub-slogan / tagline)

==== As KartuHalo/Telkomsel Halo ====
- Just For You (2012–2021)

== See also ==
- List of mobile network operators
