= Telkom Landmark Complex =

Office tower complex in Jakarta, Indonesia

The Telkom Hub

General information
- Type: office
- Location: Jakarta, Indonesia, Jalan Jenderal Gatot Subroto, Kav-52
- Construction started: 2012
- Completed: 2017
- Owner: Graha Sarana Duta dba TelkomProperty (Telkom Indonesia)

Height
- Architectural: 220 m (720 ft)
- Tip: 202.2 m

Technical details
- Floor count: 52 floors x 1; 21 floors x 1; 16 floors x 1
- Floor area: 115,500 m² / 1,243,232 ft²

Design and construction
- Architects: Woods Bagot; Pandega Desain Weharima (PDW)
- Structural engineer: PT Haerte Widya Consultant
- Main contractor: PT Adhi Karya Tbk

Telkom Landmark Complex or The Telkom Hub is an office complex of three high-rise building in Jakarta, Indonesia. The oldest of the building is known as Graha Merah Putih. The other two buildings are named as Telkom Landmark Tower and Telkomsel Smart Office.

The complex is built as a digital hub for developing digital entrepreneurs, digital infrastructure and solutions, digital innovation culture, social and technology education centers, digital customer care service as well as a smart mosque. The complex has a wide array of amenities including food and beverage court, auditorium, retail space, a fitness center, and a mosque.

- Graha Merah Putih is a 75 meters tall and 16 story building.
- Telkomsel Smart office tower is a 21 story building of 105 meters tall, which was completed in 2015.
- Telkomsel Landmark Tower is a 220 meters tall skyscraper that was topped off in 2016, and inaugurated in 2018. The building is set to become the new headquarters of Telkom Indonesia (its registered office stays in its former headquarters in Bandung). The tower has 52 floors above the ground, 3 levels of podium and 3 levels of basement. It is built with BEMS concept with LED lighting at common areas. The tower is integrated with other two buildings of the complex by a multi-story podium.

== See also ==
- Skyscraper design and construction
- List of tallest buildings in Indonesia
- List of tallest buildings in Jakarta
