= Telkom Indonesia =

Indonesian telecommunications company

PT Telekomunikasi Indonesia (Persero) Tbk

- Telkom Landmark Tower in Jakarta, Telkom Indonesia's current headquarters
- Trade name: Telkom Indonesia
- Type: Public
- Traded as: IDX: TLKM; NYSE: TLK
- ISIN: ID1000129000
- Industry: Telecommunications; Mass media; Property; Financial services; Technology
- Founded: 23 October 1856; 170 years ago (Original foundation); 6 July 1965; 61 years ago (Separated from PTT; official anniversary since 2016)
- Headquarters: Bandung, Indonesia (Corporate headquarters); Telkom Landmark Complex, Jakarta, Indonesia (Operational headquarters)
- Key people: Angga Raka Prabowo (president commissioner); Dian Siswarini (president director)
- Services: Fixed line; Mobile telephony; Internet services; Digital Television; IT Services
- Revenue: ▲ Rp 135.567 trillion (2019)
- Operating income: ▲ Rp 42.394 trillion (2019)
- Net income: ▲ Rp 18.663 trillion (2019)
- Total assets: ▲ Rp 221.208 trillion (2019)
- Total equity: ▲ Rp 99.561 trillion (2019)
- Owner: Danantara (52.09%)
- Number of employees: 24,272 (2019)
- Subsidiaries: List: Telin; Telkomsel; Telkom Akses; Mitratel; Pramindo; TelkomMetra; Graha Sarana Duta; Telkomsigma; Finnet; Admedika; Dayamitra Telekomunikasi; Digiserve; Patra Telekomunikasi Indonesia; PINS; MetraPlasa; TelkomInfra
- Website: www.telkom.co.id

PT Telekomunikasi Indonesia (Persero) Tbk (lit. 'Telecommunications Indonesia State-owned Public Limited Company') officially shortened into PT Telkom Indonesia (Persero) Tbk, also simply known as Telkom, is an Indonesian multinational telecommunications conglomerate with its corporate headquarters in Bandung and its operational headquarters in the Telkom Landmark Complex in Jakarta. Telkom is listed on the Indonesia Stock Exchange and has a secondary listing on the New York Stock Exchange—the only Indonesian company, currently listed there (but not the first—the first was Indosat, which delisted from the exchange in 2013). The government of Indonesia owns over half of the Telkom's outstanding shares.

Telkom has major business lines in fixed line telephony, internet, and data communications. It is operated as the parent company of the Telkom Group, which is engaged in a broad range of businesses which consist of telecommunication, multimedia, property, and financial services. Since 2008, Telkom Indonesia began changing its business, focusing on infrastructure, systems, organization and human resources, and the corporate culture, in order to face the rising competition.

After privatization in 1995, Telkom Indonesia's total consumer base grew by 7.8% in 2010 to 129.8 million customers at the end of December 2011, making the company the nation's largest telecommunication service provider in terms of subscriber count.

== History ==
Telkom is one of the oldest telecommunication companies in the world, with its history dating back to the colonial period. The company's history started on 23 October 1856, when the colonial government established an electromagnetic telegraph service connecting Batavia (Jakarta) and Buitenzorg (Bogor).

The telegraph service continued to grow, and in 1884, the colonial government established a private company in Bandung to provide postal and domestic telegraph services, which were later upgraded to international telegraph and telephone services.

=== Early years ===
Telephony services to the colony were introduced in 1882, initially under the management of private companies with government licenses. Then, to centralize things, the Dutch government consolidated all postal and telegraph services in 1906 into a single state agency: the Post, Telegraph and Telephone Service (Dutch: Post-, Telegraaf-, en Telefoondienst, PTT).

The turmoil of World War II profoundly affected the development of this government institution. Following the Nazi occupation of the Netherlands in May 1940, the government-in-exile decided to assert direct state control over all Dutch property, including PTT assets in the colonies, to prevent them from falling into German hands. This was, however, temporary, as Japan occupied the Dutch East Indies between 1942 and 1945 and took over all communication networks.

Following the proclamation of independence by Indonesia in August 1945, nationalists took over PTT headquarters in Bandung the following month. The transfer of ownership was formalized in December 1949, following the Indonesian National Revolution.

=== State-owned company ===
In 1961, the PTT was transformed from a government agency into a statutory corporation, the Postal and Telecommunications Services company. Four years later, on 6 July 1965, the Indonesian government split the company in two: PN Pos Giro would handle mail services, and PN Telekomunikasi would be responsible for telecommunications. The postal branch would eventually evolve into Pos Indonesia in 1995, which remains the state-owned postal service for the nation's 230 million people.

PN Telekomunikasi itself was further divided in 1974. A new entity, Perusahaan Umum Telekomunikasi (Perumtel), was created to run both domestic and international telecommunications services, while PT Industri Telekomunikasi Indonesia (PT INTI) was established to manufacture telecommunications equipment. The international arm was then spun off in 1980, becoming the newly nationalized PT Indonesian Satellite Corporation (Indosat).

By 1991, Perumtel had been incorporated as a state-owned perseroan terbatas (limited liability company) and was renamed Perusahaan Perseroan (Persero) PT Telekomunikasi Indonesia, or Telkom. For its first few years as Telkom, the company operated through twelve regional units called Wilayah Telekomunikasi (Witel), each responsible for all aspects of business in its territory.

In 1995, Telkom reorganized the twelve Witels into seven regional divisions and one network division. In a bid to bring in private capital and expertise, Telkom then entered into Operational Cooperation Agreements (KSO), transferring operational rights for five of its seven regions (I, III, IV, VI, and VII) to private consortia. Under these agreements, partners would manage the regions, build new fixed-line infrastructure, and share revenue with Telkom for a fixed term, after which the assets would revert to the company.

=== Privatization ===
On 14 November 1995, Telkom was privatized through an initial public offering (IPO), with its shares listed on the Jakarta Stock Exchange and the Surabaya Stock Exchange (these two later merged in December 2007 to form the Indonesia Stock Exchange). Its shares were then listed on the New York and London stock exchanges (as American depositary shares) and offered on the Tokyo Stock Exchange. Today, Telkom is Indonesia's largest company by market capitalization, valued at approximately IDR 190.5 trillion as of the end of 2009. The Indonesian government retains an aggregate interest of 51.19% of the issued and outstanding shares of Telkom. It also holds one Dwiwarna, or golden share, granting it certain veto powers.

In mid-1997, Indonesia was badly affected by the Asian economic crisis. Among those impacted were certain KSO partners, who experienced difficulties in fulfilling their obligations to Telkom. Telkom eventually acquired control of its KSO partners in Regions I, III, and VI, and amended the terms of the KSO agreements with its KSO partners in Regions IV and VII to obtain legal rights to control the financial and operating decisions of those regions.

Since 5 June 2014, Telkom shares are no longer traded on the London Stock Exchange ("LSE"), and since 16 May 2014, they have ceased to be registered on the Tokyo Stock Exchange ("TSE") in Japan.

=== Telecommunication deregulation ===
In 1999, Indonesia passed a deregulating telecommunication law that set in motion a sweeping array of reforms and enlivened competition policy, private investment, and long term industry direction. Among the proposed reforms were the progressive elimination of the joint ownership, by Telkom and Indosat, of most of the telecommunications companies in Indonesia. This was intended to promote a more competitive market. As a result, in 2001, Telkom acquired Indosat's 35.0% stake in Telkomsel, resulting in Telkom owning 77.7% of the shares of Telkomsel, while Indosat acquired Telkom's 22.5% interest in Satelindo and its 37.7% stake in Lintasarta. In 2002, Telkom sold 12.7% of Telkomsel to Singapore Telecom Mobile Pte Ltd (SingTel Mobile), reducing Telkom's ownership of Telkomsel to 65.0%.

On 1 August 2001, the Government terminated Telkom's exclusive right to provide fixed line services in Indonesia and Indosat's right to provide international direct dial services. Subsequently, Telkom's exclusive rights to provide domestic and long-distance services were terminated in August 2002 and August 2003, respectively.

On 7 June 2004, Telkom began to provide their own international direct dial fixed line services. On 16 November 2005, the Telkom-2 satellite was launched to replace all satellite transmission services that have been served by previous satellite, Palapa B-4.

=== Transformations ===
In 2009, Telkom started transforming its business, being the only company in the field of telecommunications to transform to a broader range of business. The company expanded to telecommunications, information technology services, media and edutainment. Telkom's decision to transform its business was prompted by the shift in customer lifestyles and supported by advances in technology and regulatory changes that enabled service providers to deliver enhanced service to customers. With this new business transformation, Telkom also plans to conduct the acquisition of several companies that are in line with Telkom's transformation of the new business.

In August 2012, the Telkom-3 satellite was lost in a launch failure, being placed into an unusably low orbit following the failure of the Briz-M upper stage of the Proton-M rocket that had launched it. Its replacement Telkom-3S successfully launched aboard an Ariane 5 rocket on 14 February 2017, 21:39 UTC.

In March 2019, Telkom Indonesia was one of the first Asian telco's to launch a cloud gaming service in cooperation with Gamestream.

== Operations ==
Telkom Indonesia is a dominant and largest provider of fixed line services due to owning most of Indonesia's copper network. Telkom also runs telephone exchanges, trunk network and local loop connections for its fixed-line telephones. Currently, Telkom is responsible for approximately 8.3 million telephone lines in Indonesia. And like most of the other state-ownership telecommunication companies in the world, Telkom is obliged to provide public services such as public call boxes.

Telkom Indonesia businesses are operated under government regulation by the Indonesian Ministry of Communication and Information. Telkom, as a government-owned company, is required to comply with additional obligations such as provide telecommunication services and not being discriminatory. As well as providing service in those regulated areas, Telkom has expanded into more profitable products and services where there is less government-owned-related regulation.

Telkom Indonesia is the parent company of the Telkom Group, which is engaged in a wide range of businesses that consist of telecommunication, information, multimedia, property, and financial services. Telkom mainly operates in fixed line telephony, Internet and data communications business, while other businesses are run by subsidiaries.

=== Business divisions ===
Telkom now categorizes its portfolio into 3 Digital Business Domains:

1. Digital Connectivity: Fiber to the x (FTTx), 5G, Software Defined Networking (SDN)/ Network Function Virtualization (NFV)/ Satellite
2. Digital Platform: Data Center, Cloud, Internet of Things (IoT), Big Data/ Artificial Intelligence (AI), Cybersecurity
3. Digital Services: Enterprise, Consumer

=== Subsidiaries and investments (Telkom Group) ===
- Telin (Telekomunikasi Indonesia International): International telecommunications services and investment company
- Telkomsel: Consumer division, until 2023 wireless division; joint venture with Singtel
- Infomedia Nusantara: Information & communication services
- Digiserve : ICT services
- Multimedia Nusantara: Strategic investment and holding company
  - Telkomsigma: IT, consulting services and data centre
  - Finnet: Financial services
  - Mojopia: Internet commerce business
  - Melon Indonesia: Music and entertainment business (with SK Telecom)
  - Admedika: Healthcare network provider
  - MDI Ventures: Corporate Venture Capital
- TelkomProperty: Property development and management company
- PINS Indonesia: Trading, distribution, and integration CPE business
  - Scicom: Global CRM consulting, technology services, education, and outsourcing company
- Daya Mitratel: Wireless telecommunication provider
- Telkom Akses: Wireline telecommunication provider
- Napsindo: Marketing business

Other investments:

- Patrakom: Strategic IT and telecommunications
- Bangtelindo: Telecommunication planning, construction, installation and maintenance company
- PT Pasifik Satelit Nusantara: Satellite telecommunications company
- Citra Sari Makmur: Satellite and terrestrial network company

== Corporate identity ==
The "cricket ball" logo used from 1 May 1991 until 13 September 2002

The "cricket ball" logo used from 13 September 2002 until 16 October 2009

Logo used from 16 October 2009 until 16 August 2013

Logo used since 17 August 2013

=== Slogans ===
- Setia Melayani Anda (Serving You Faithfully, 1 January 1995–13 September 2002)
- Dimensi Baru Informasi dan Komunikasi (New Dimensions of Information and Communication, 1 January 2000–13 September 2002)
- Bersama Meraih Masa Depan (Together Achieving the Future, 2001–13 September 2002)
- Committed 2 U (pronounced as Committed To You, 13 September 2002–16 October 2009)
- The World in Your Hand (16 October 2009-present)
