= MDL Philippines =

Developmental league of MPL Philippines

- Game: Mobile Legends: Bang Bang
- First season: 2023
- Administrator: Moonton
- No. of teams: 12
- Country: Philippines
- Most recent champions: TL Academy PH (Season 6)
- Most titles: TL Academy PH (2 titles)

The Mobile Legends: Bang Bang Development League Philippines, commonly known as MDL Philippines (MDL PH), is the developmental league of MPL Philippines, the country's top-level esports league for Mobile Legends: Bang Bang. The league includes academy teams of their MPL counterparts as well as independent teams. It is the second developmental league in MLBB esports, after MDL Indonesia.

== History ==
On January 25, 2023, Moonton announced the establishment of the Philippines' own Mobile Legends: Bang Bang Development League or MDL Philippines. MDL Philippines began its first season on February 15 of the same year.

MDL Philippines introduced eight development teams from their professional franchise organizations. Notably, Bren Esports (now known as AP Bren), became the first team to collaborate with Euphoria Esports for MDL Philippines Season 1, the first partnership between two teams in the MDL. Furthermore, MDL Philippines would include two Non-MPL franchise teams in ZOL Esports and GameLab Esports.

=== Season 1 ===
During Season 1, teams were split into two groups: Group A and Group B. Teams in their respective groups will play a double round robin format of games and with the remainder of the season, will go into a single round robin tournament to face cross-matches between both groups. The top two teams from both groups received two first-round byes, teams seeded 2nd and 3rd were slated into the first knockout rounds and the remaining two teams were eliminated from playoff contention.

GameLab Esports and ECHO Philippines' MDL team ECHO Proud tied for the best record in MDL Philippines Season 1 with a 10–3 record, and a 22–8, and 23–9 match win-loss record, respectively. Both teams would eventually face each other in the grand final where ECHO Proud won their first MDL title and the first MDL Philippines title, defeating GameLab 3–1.

=== Season 2 ===
Season 2 would feature many rebranding efforts from the MPL-franchised teams. Blacklist International partnered with Malaysian organization Team Lunatix, the Bren-Euphoria partnership came to an end after AP Esports acquired the rights to the Bren Esports organization, ZOL Esports and TNC Neo partnered to TNCZ4, and RSG Philippines partnering with local amateur team Mistah Esports Pro.

MDL Philippines introduced two additional non-MPL Teams, increasing the number of participants from ten to twelve. These included GameLab Esports, Euphoria Esports, amateur team MHRLK Esports and RRQ Kaito, the first MLBB roster for the Indonesian organization, Rex Regnum Qeon.

Certain scandals plagued some teams of MDL Philippines Season 2, most-notably the termination of the partnership between Blacklist International and Team Lunatix over a mismanagement situation on the part of Team Lunatix. This prompted the immediate termination of the partnership.

ECHO Proud for the second-consecutive season topped the regular season with a 10–1 game record and a 20–6 match record. Season 2's format would be different from its predecessor, opting for a single-round-robin match due to the number of teams. The top 8 teams would advance to the playoffs.

=== Season 3 ===
Season 3 reduced the number of teams from twelve to ten as MHRLK Esports and Euphoria Esports departed the amateur league. This was the first season where defending champions ECHO Proud plummeted from the first seed to the fifth seed, ending the regular season with a 5–4; 12–10 record. Furthermore, this was the first season with an international organization in RRQ Kaito claiming the first seed.

Season three was another season plagued with scandals and misdemeanor as the league reported issues of game fixing between certain teams. As a result, three players were indefinitely banned from participating in any Moonton-sponsored leagues and events.

ECHO Proud qualified for the Grand Final of MDL Philippines Season 3 after defeating Omega Neos 2–0 in the semifinals stage. This is ECHO Proud's third consecutive grand final appearance since season 1. Moreover, RRQ Kaito secured a grand final spot after beating Blacklist Rough World Era 2–0 in the semifinals. RRQ Kaito defeated ECHO Proud 3–2 in the grand final, making the second team to win an MDL title after two, back-to-back titles for ECHO Proud.

=== Season 4 ===
The fourth season of MDL Philippines will showcase for the first time regional qualifiers for Philippine teams across its three island clusters: Luzon, Visayas, and Mindanao. The qualifier rounds itself will last from the last week of July until the month of August with MDL Philippines aiming to begin by a hair earlier than MPL Philippines Season 14.

=== Results ===
==== By season ====
Year	Season	Champion	Results		First runner-up	Second runner-up	Third runner-up	Finals MVP
2023	1	ECHO Proud	3	1	GameLab Esports	Blacklist Academy; Bren Euphoria		Jaypee
2023	2	ECHO Proud	3	1	Omega Neos	TNCZ4	Euphoria Esports	Zaida
2024	3	RRQ Kaito	3	2	ECHO Proud	Blacklist Academy; Omega Neos		Ferdz
2024	4	Lazy Esports	4	3	RRQ Kaito	Team Liquid PH Academy; Omega Neos		Jamespangks
2025	5	ONIC x Nine Lives	4	1	Aurora Hunters	Omega Neos; RRQ Kaito		Kayn
2025	6	AP Bren x Rough World Era	4	2	RRQ Kaito	Aurora Hunters; Uncle Drew X Gamerpact Ascend		Matt
2026	7	Aurora Hunters	4	3	Twisted Minds RWE	Raii x ROCK; Martial Mayhem TM		Eskapo

==== By team ====
Team	Champions	Runner up	2nd runner up	3rd runner up
TL Academy PH^{1}	2 (S1, S2)	1 (S3)	1 (S4)	0
RRQ Kaito	1 (S3)	1 (S4)	1 (S5)	1 (S5)
Lazy Esports	1 (S4)	0	0	0
ONIC x Minerva	1 (S5)	0	1 (S3)	1 (S3)
AP Bren x Rough World Era	1 (S6)	0	1 (S1)	1 (S1)
Blacklist Academy	0	0	2 (S1, S3)	1 (S1)
Omega Neos	0	1 (S2)	3 (S3, S4, S5)	3 (S3, S4, S5)
TNC x Voltes PH	0	0	1 (S2)	2 (S3, S4)
Martial Mayhem	0	0	1 (S7)	1 (S4)
Aurora Hunters	1 (S7)	1 (S5)	0	0
GameLab	0	1 (S1)	0	0
Euphoria Esports	0	0	1 (S2)	1 (S2)
Rai x ROCK	0	0	1 (S7)	0
Twsited Minds	0	1 (S7)	0	0

^{1} - Formerly known as ECHO Proud and Liquid ECHO.

Italic - Team pulled out of the league.
