= Vulcan (gamer) =

Canadian League of Legends player

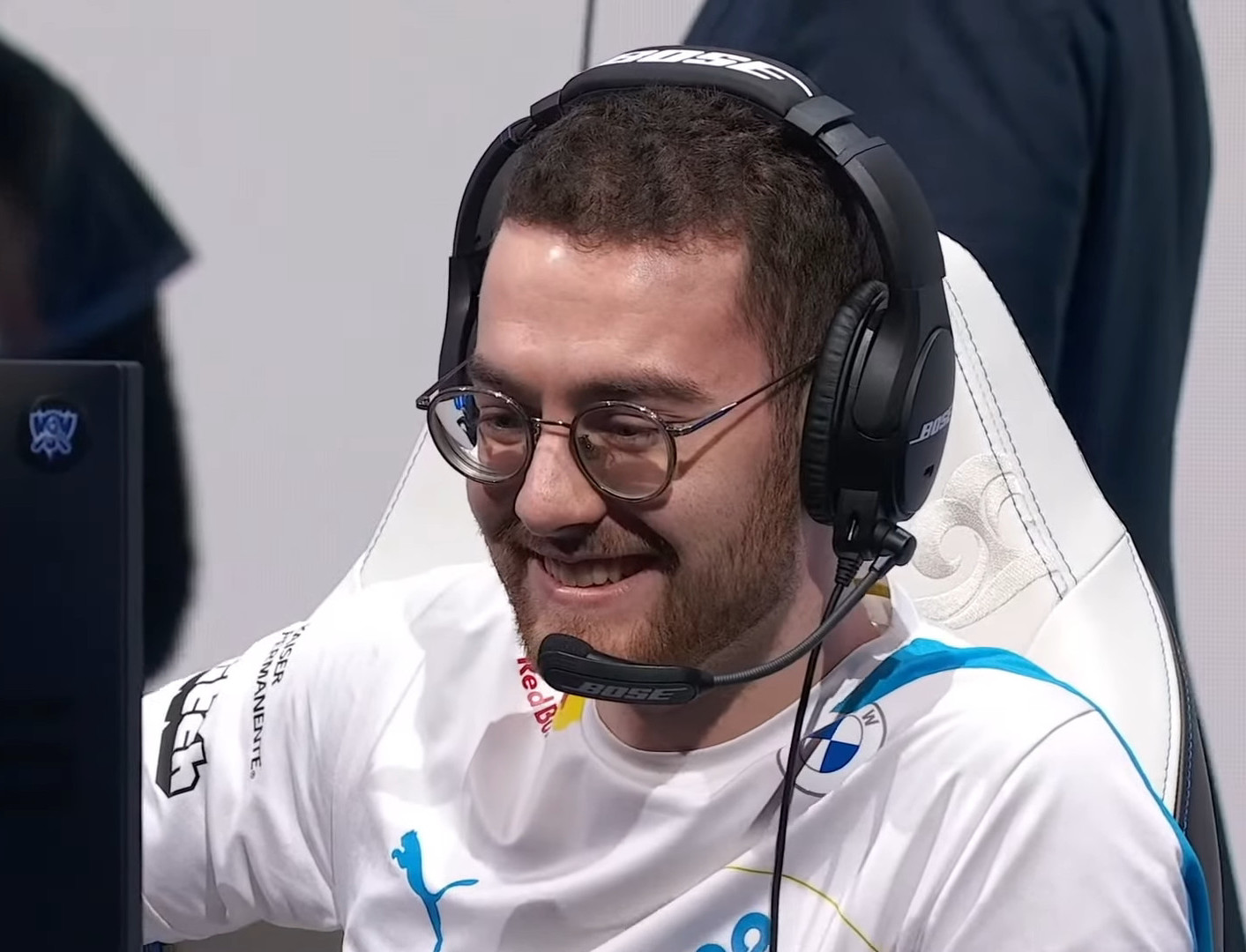
- Laflamme in 2021

Personal information
- Name: Philippe Laflamme
- Born: 1999 or 2000 (age 26–27); Laval, Quebec, Canada
- Nationality: Canadian

Current team
- Team: Cloud9
- Role: Support
- Game: League of Legends
- League: LTA (North Conference)

Team history
- 2019: Clutch Gaming
- 2020–2021: Cloud9
- 2022–2023: Evil Geniuses
- 2023: FlyQuest
- 2024–present: Cloud9

Philippe Laflamme, better known as Vulcan, is a Canadian professional League of Legends support for Cloud9, in the League of Legends Championship of The Americas (LTA) North Conference. Previously, Vulcan had played for Clutch Gaming, the team that drafted him in the League Championship Series (LCS), Evil Geniuses, and FlyQuest.

== Professional career ==
=== Clutch Gaming ===
Vulcan was invited to the LCS proving grounds following the 2018 season, in which he showcased his skills, as well as his communication and teamwork. He was drafted fourth overall by Clutch Gaming, which gave the organization exclusive negotiation rights with Vulcan. Vulcan signed with Clutch, and entered the 2019 LCS season as their starting support, making his debut on January 26. The team had a rough start, going 5–13 in his first season, missing playoffs. Due to the team's poor performance, Vulcan's bot lane partner Piglet was released, and AD Carry Cody Sun was signed as his replacement. In the summer split, Vulcan and Clutch made playoffs as the fifth seed, and finished fourth overall, after losing the third place match to Counter Logic Gaming. However they qualified for the regional gauntlet as the lowest seeded team, and proceeded to defeat FlyQuest, Counter Logic Gaming, and Team SoloMid in consecutive matches to qualify for the third and final spot in the 2019 League of Legends World Championship. However at worlds, Clutch were unable to win a game in the group stage, becoming the first North American team to go 0–6.

=== Cloud9 ===
In the 2019 off season, Cloud9 acquired Vulcan for a reported US$1.5 Million buyout. After several months boot–camping in Korea, Vulcan and his new bot lane partner Zven dominated the rest of the LCS in 2020, and Cloud9 went 17–1 on the season, with Vulcan and the entire C9 roster winning First Team All–Pro. Vulcan also received several MVP votes, although the award ultimately went to his teammate Blaber. The team went on to sweep FlyQuest in the finals, and Vulcan won his first LCS title. MSI 2020 was cancelled due to the ongoing COVID-19 pandemic, so the next time Vulcan played was in the 2020 summer split, where he picked up a Second Team All–Pro award for his regular season performance. Despite their impressive spring split, Cloud9 lost in playoffs, finishing fourth and missing out on Worlds 2020, the first year Vulcan did not attend.

In the 2021 LCS season, Vulcan was awarded another Second Team All–Pro in the spring split, after Cloud9 accrued a league best 13–5 record. The team went on to win another split after defeating Team Liquid in the Mid Season Showdown, Vulcan's second title. Due to their spring victory, Cloud9 qualified for the 2021 Mid Season Invitational in Iceland. The team succeeded in the group stage, but did not make is past the rumble stage, bowing out in fifth. In the summer of LCS, Vulcan was selected to the Third Team All–Pro as Cloud9 made playoffs, and despite falling out of the upper bracket early, Cloud9 qualified for Worlds after wins over Golden Guardians, Evil Geniuses, and Team SoloMid. At the World Championship, Cloud9 made it to the quarterfinals, before losing 3–0 to Gen.G, finishing 5th-8th, Vulcan's best international finish.

=== Evil Geniuses ===
Vulcan joined Evil Geniuses for the 2022 season, and noted that despite his respect for Zven, he wanted to try a new lane partner after two years together on Cloud9. He won his second LCS title during the 2021 LCS Spring Season, beating 100 Thieves 3–0 in the finals.
