= Damonte (gamer) =

American League of Legends player and coach (born 1997/98)

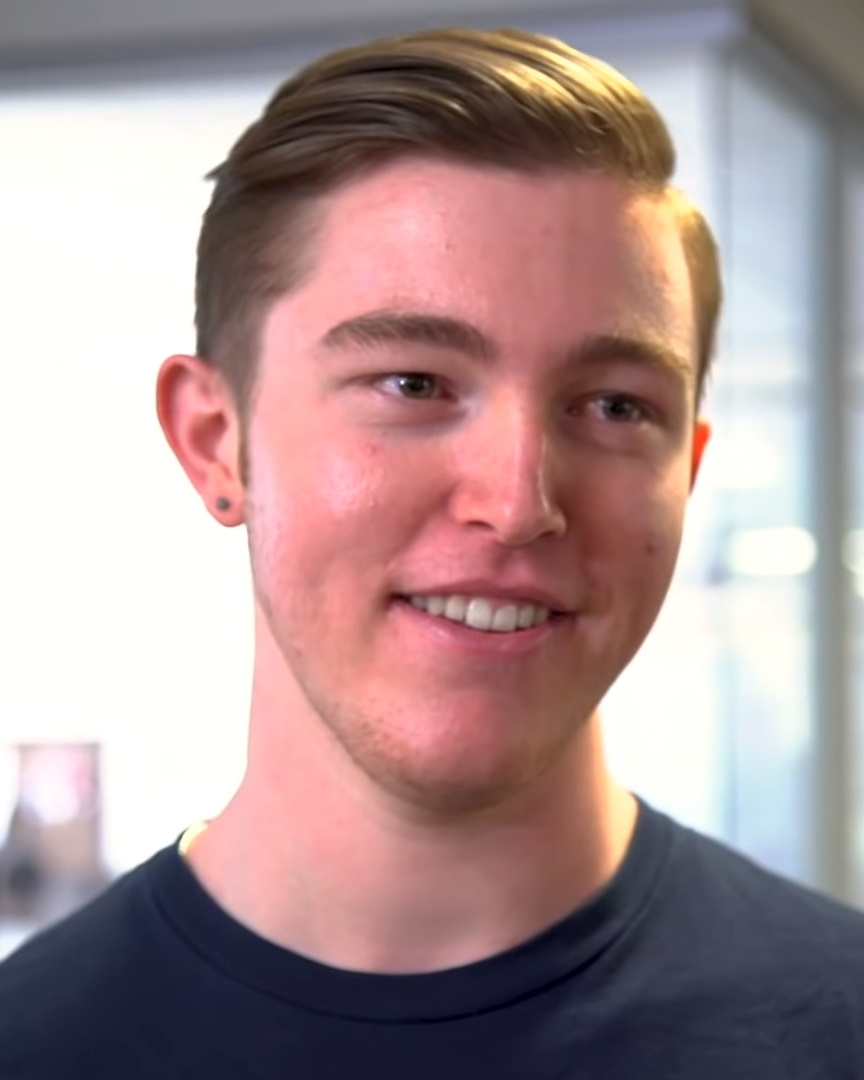
- Damonte in 2018

Personal information
- Name: Tanner Damonte
- Born: 1997 or 1998 (age 28–29)
- Nationality: American

Current team
- Team: Shopify Rebellion
- Role: Mid
- Game: League of Legends
- League: LCS

Career information
- Playing career: 2015–2021
- Coaching career: 2021–present

Team history

As player:
- 2016–2018: Echo Fox
- 2018–2019: Clutch Gaming
- 2019: Dignitas
- 2019–2020: Dignitas Academy
- 2020: Golden Guardians
- 2020–2021: 100 Thieves
- 2021: 100 Thieves Academy
- 2021: Counter Logic Gaming

As coach:
- 2021–2023: Counter Logic Gaming
- 2023: NRG Esports
- 2023–2025: FlyQuest
- 2025–present: Shopify Rebellion

Tanner Damonte, better known mononymously as Damonte (/dəˈmɒnteɪ/), is an American professional League of Legends player and coach. In 2019, he was one of the few domestic mid laners to compete in North America's LCS, alongside other players like Goldenglue and Pobelter. He is particularly known for his mastery of the champion Qiyana.

== Career ==
=== Echo Fox (2016–2018) ===
Damonte began playing League of Legends competitively in January 2015, competing in amateur leagues under the names "Mini" and "Mini Me". In February 2016 he joined his first major professional team, Echo Fox, as a substitute player. From July 2016 to June 2017, he played as the mid laner for Delta Fox, Echo Fox's academy team competing in the Challenger Series.

Damonte made his LCS debut in May 2017, after he was promoted to a starting position in Echo Fox's main roster. However, he was moved back to the academy roster in December 2017, before once again being promoted to the main roster in July 2018 following a brief suspension for poor behaviour in online ranked matches.

=== Clutch Gaming (2019) ===
In November 2018 it was announced that Clutch Gaming had signed Damonte to a two-year contract to complete its starting roster for the 2019 spring split. Initially seeing disappointing results with a ninth-place finish in the 2019 LCS Spring regular season, Damonte and his teammates made a comeback in the summer split after replacing Piglet with Cody Sun in the bot lane. The team first secured a spot in the summer playoffs after defeating the Golden Guardians in a determining match, then they defeated TSM in the quarterfinals, before losing to Team Liquid in the semifinals. Due to being reverse swept by CLG in the third-place decider match, Clutch Gaming was forced to begin in the first round of the regional qualifier for the 2019 World Championship. After defeating FlyQuest, CLG and TSM in the first, second and third rounds respectively, Damonte qualified for his first World Championship, alongside his teammates.

At the 2019 World Championship, Clutch Gaming began in the play-in stage as North America's third seed, only qualifying for the main event after defeating Turkish team Royal Youth in the second round of the play-in stage. Because of group draw rules for the main event, Clutch Gaming was forced into Group C, which was nicknamed the "group of death" due to it having three regional superteams: South Korea's SK Telecom T1, China's Royal Never Give Up, and Europe's Fnatic. Clutch Gaming finished last in their group and were eliminated without picking up a single win in the main event.

In the off-season, Clutch Gaming was merged with Dignitas and Damonte was transferred to Dignitas' new League of Legends roster. However, in November 2019 Damonte announced that Dignitas had decided not to exercise the second year option stipulated under his original contract with Clutch Gaming (which Dignitas had acquired), and that he had been released from the team.

=== Dignitas Academy (2020) ===
Dignitas announced on December 16, 2019, that it had signed Damonte to its academy team for the 2020 spring split. Dignitas Academy had a strong start to the spring split, maintaining first place throughout the first half of the regular season. However, the team was overtaken by Cloud9 Academy in the second half and finished second, earning them a bye to the semifinals, where they lost to Evil Geniuses Academy.

=== Golden Guardians (2020) ===
On May 5, 2020, Damonte left Dignitas Academy to join Golden Guardians.

=== 100 Thieves (2021) ===
100 Thieves announced on November 19, 2020, that it had acquired Damonte and Huhi from the Golden Guardians.

=== Counter Logic Gaming (2021) ===
Damonte joined Counter Logic Gaming as their starting mid laner on July 13, 2021. He transitioned to the role of positional coach at the end of the year.

== Personal life ==
In April 2020, Damonte partnered with professional baseball player Hunter Pence as part of Verizon's "Pay It Forward Live" campaign to raise money for small businesses affected by the COVID-19 pandemic. The pair played a friendly match together on April 14.
