= Goldenglue =

American League of Legends player and coach

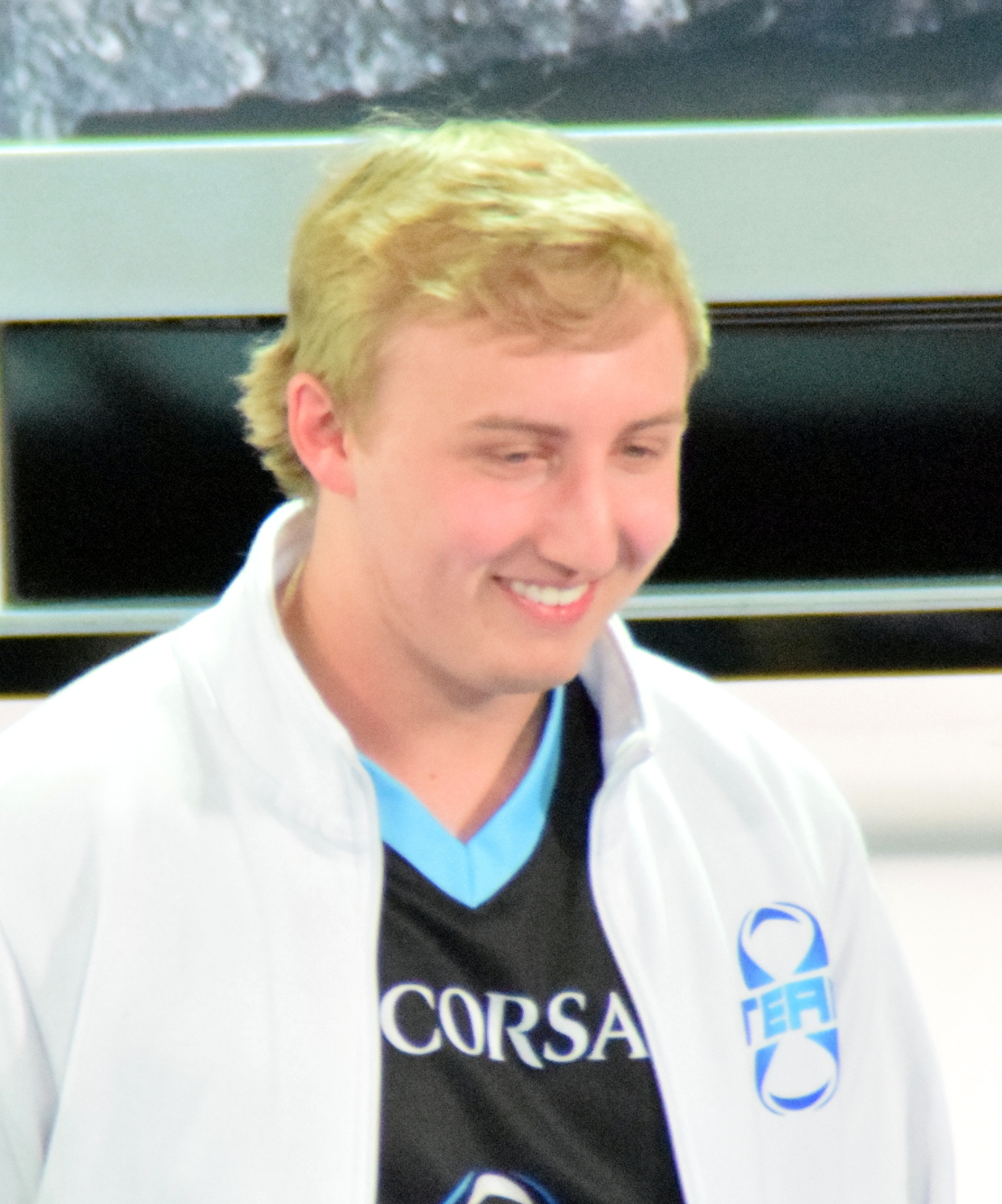
- Gilmer in 2015

Personal information
- Name: Greyson Gregory Gilmer
- Born: November 23, 1996 (age 29)
- Nationality: American

Current team
- Team: Sentinels
- Role: Head coach
- Game: League of Legends
- League: LCS

Career information
- Playing career: 2013–2020
- Role: Mid
- Coaching career: 2020–present

Team history

As player:
- 2013–2014: Skyline
- 2014: compLexity.Red
- 2014: Dignitas
- 2014: Team Coast
- 2014–2015: compLexity Gaming
- 2015: Frank Fang Gaming
- 2015: Team 8
- 2015–2016: Ember
- 2016: Echo Fox
- 2016–2017: Team Liquid
- 2017–2019: Cloud9
- 2019–2020: Golden Guardians
- 2020: Evil Geniuses

As coach:
- 2020–2022: 100 Thieves Academy
- 2023: Disguised
- 2024–2025: 100 Thieves
- 2026–present: Sentinels

Greyson Gregory Gilmer (born November 23, 1996), better known by his in-game name Goldenglue, is an American League of Legends coach and former professional player. He is currently the head coach of LCS team Sentinels.

== Early life ==
Gilmer was raised in the town of Flower Mound, Texas. As a teenager he played varsity football for Edward S. Marcus High School. After receiving an offer from NA LCS team Dignitas in March 2014, Gilmer decided to quit football and focus on a career in professional esports.

== Career ==
Dignitas signed Greyson "Goldenglue" Gilmer in March 2014 to replace their long-time mid laner William "Scarra" Li, who had agreed to transition to a coaching role. However, two weeks later Goldenglue was benched and Scarra was brought back to the mid lane; Goldenglue left the team shortly thereafter.

Goldenglue played for several Challenger teams afterward from mid-2014 to late 2016, and only played briefly for a few LCS teams during relegation matches or as an emergency substitute player. In late 2016 Goldenglue was offered a starting spot on Team Liquid for the 2017 NA LCS Spring Split, but was benched again after the team's disappointing performance in the first half of the regular season. Goldenglue returned to his starting position the next split but was benched again, prompting him to leave the team.

Following the NA LCS' franchising in late 2017, Goldenglue joined Cloud9's academy team. During Goldenglue's stay on the team, Cloud9 Academy finished first in every regular season, but they were never able to win playoffs; the highest finish by the team was runners-up, which they accomplished twice. Despite helping Cloud9's main roster defeat Team SoloMid in the 2018 NA LCS Summer Playoffs, Goldenglue was not offered a starting position by any LCS team for the 2019 season, and he stayed on Cloud9 Academy for another year.

In late 2019 Goldenglue was signed by Golden Guardians for the 2020 LCS Spring Split, but after barely qualifying for and finishing fifth/sixth in playoffs, Goldenglue was benched yet again and replaced by Damonte. Golden Guardians released Goldenglue from their starting roster shortly after, and Goldenglue made a statement saying he believed he was still LCS-caliber and would be trying out for teams as either a player or coach for the next split.

Although initially not receiving any offers to play in the LCS for the summer split, Goldenglue was signed by Evil Geniuses on July 16, 2020, after the first half of the regular season.

Goldenglue joined Sentinels as the head coach of their League of Legends team for the 2026 LCS season, following his departure from 100 Thieves.
