= 2019 LCS season =

- League: LCS
- Sport: League of Legends
- Duration: January 26 – April 13 (Spring); June 1 – August 25 (Summer); September 6–8 (Regional finals)
- Teams: 10
- TV partner(s): Caffeine, Twitch, YouTube, ESPN+

Spring
- Champions: Team Liquid
- Runners-up: Team SoloMid
- Top seed: Team Liquid
- Season MVP: Jo "CoreJJ" Yong-in

Summer
- Champions: Team Liquid
- Runners-up: Cloud9
- Top seed: Team Liquid
- Season MVP: Dennis "Svenskeren" Johnsen

Regional finals
- Winner: Clutch Gaming

LCS seasons
- ← 2018 2020 →

The 2019 LCS season was the seventh season of the League of Legends Championship Series (LCS), a professional esports league for the video game League of Legends. The season was divided into two splits: Spring and Summer. The Spring Split began on January 26 and culminated with the playoff finals on April 13, 2019. The Summer Split began on June 1 and culminated with the Spring Split finals on August 25, 2019.

Team Liquid won the spring split playoffs, qualifying them for the 2019 Mid-Season Invitational. Team Liquid also won the summer split playoffs, directly qualifying them for the 2019 World Championship. Cloud9 and Clutch Gaming also qualified for the 2019 World Championship via Championship Points and winning the Regional Finals, respectively.

== Spring ==
The Spring Split regular season began on January 26 and ended on March 24, 2019. The regular season followed a standard double round-robin format, where each team faced every other team twice. The top six teams from the regular season advanced to the playoffs, a single-elimination tournament, which ran from March 29 to April 13, 2019. Of the six teams, the top two started in the semifinals, while the bottom four started in the quarterfinals. The winner of the playoffs advanced to the 2019 Mid-Season Invitational. The Spring Split final was played at the Chaifetz Arena in St. Louis, Missouri.

=== Regular season ===
Pos	Team	Pld	W	L	PCT	Qualification
1	Team Liquid	18	14	4	.778	Advance to semifinals
2	Cloud9	18	14	4	.778	Advance to semifinals
3	Team SoloMid	18	13	5	.722	Advance to quarterfinals
4	FlyQuest	19	10	9	.526	Advance to quarterfinals
5	Golden Guardians	19	9	10	.474	Advance to quarterfinals
6	Echo Fox	18	8	10	.444	Advance to quarterfinals
7	Counter Logic Gaming	18	7	11	.389	
8	OpTic Gaming	18	7	11	.389	
9	Clutch Gaming	18	5	13	.278	
10	100 Thieves	18	4	14	.222	

Source: LoL Esports
Rules for classification: 1) Winning percentage; 2) head-to-head record; 3) tiebreaker match(es)

=== Playoffs ===
Quarterfinals
3	Team SoloMid	3
6	Echo Fox	1
4	FlyQuest	3
5	Golden Guardians	2

Semifinals
1	Team Liquid	3
4	FlyQuest	0
Top seed selects opponent
2	Cloud9	2
3	Team SoloMid	3

Final
1	Team Liquid	3
3	Team SoloMid	2

=== Awards ===
- Most Valuable Player: CoreJJ, Team Liquid
- Rookie of the Split: V1per, FlyQuest
- Coach of the Split: Reapered, Cloud9
- 1st Team All-Pro:
  - T Licorice, Cloud9
  - J Xmithie, Team Liquid
  - M Bjergsen, Team SoloMid
  - B Doublelift, Team Liquid
  - S CoreJJ, Team Liquid
- 2nd Team All-Pro:
  - T Impact, Team Liquid
  - J Svenskeren, Cloud9
  - M Jensen, Team Liquid
  - B Sneaky, Cloud9
  - S Zeyzal, Cloud9
- 3rd Team All-Pro:
  - T Broken Blade, Team SoloMid
  - J Santorin, FlyQuest
  - M Nisqy, Cloud9
  - B Zven, Team SoloMid
  - S Smoothie, Team SoloMid

== Summer ==
The Summer Split regular season ran from June 1 to August 4, 2019, and followed the same format as the Spring Split. The top six teams from the summer regular season secured spots in the Summer Split playoffs, which ran from August 10 to 25, 2019. The playoffs were a single-elimination tournament, with top two teams starting in the semifinals and the following four starting in the quarterfinals. The winner of the summer playoffs directly qualified for the 2019 World Championship. The third place match and final took place at Little Caesars Arena in Detroit, Michigan.

=== Regular season ===
Pos	Team	Pld	W	L	PCT	Qualification
1	Team Liquid	18	14	4	.778	Advance to semifinals
2	Cloud9	19	13	6	.684	Advance to semifinals
3	Counter Logic Gaming	19	12	7	.632	Advance to quarterfinals
4	Team SoloMid	18	10	8	.556	Advance to quarterfinals
5	Clutch Gaming	18	9	9	.500	Advance to quarterfinals
6	OpTic Gaming	20	10	10	.500	Advance to quarterfinals
7	Golden Guardians	19	8	11	.421	
8	100 Thieves	19	8	11	.421	
9	FlyQuest	18	5	13	.278	
10	Echo Fox	18	4	14	.222	

Source: LoL Esports
Rules for classification: 1) Winning percentage; 2) head-to-head record; 3) tiebreaker match(es)

=== Playoffs ===
- Format: Single elimination, best-of-five

Quarterfinals
3	Counter Logic Gaming	3
6	OpTic Gaming	0
4	Team SoloMid	1
5	Clutch Gaming	3

Semifinals
1	Team Liquid	3
5	Clutch Gaming	2
Top seed selects opponent
2	Cloud9	3
3	Counter Logic Gaming	1

Final
1	Team Liquid	3
2	Cloud9	2
Third place
5	Clutch Gaming	2
3	Counter Logic Gaming	3

=== Awards ===
- Most Valuable Player: Svenskeren, Cloud9
- Rookie of the Split: FakeGod, 100 Thieves
- Coach of the Split: Cain, Team Liquid
- 1st Team All-Pro:
  - T Impact, Team Liquid
  - J Svenskeren, Cloud9
  - M Jensen, Team Liquid
  - B Doublelift, Team Liquid
  - S CoreJJ, Team Liquid
- 2nd Team All-Pro:
  - T Licorice, Cloud9
  - J Xmithie, Team Liquid
  - M Nisqy, Cloud9
  - B Stixxay, Counter Logic Gaming
  - S Biofrost, Counter Logic Gaming
- 3rd Team All-Pro:
  - T Ruin, Counter Logic Gaming
  - J Wiggily, Counter Logic Gaming
  - M Bjergsen, Team SoloMid
  - B Cody Sun, Clutch Gaming
  - S Zeyzal, Cloud9

== Championship Points ==
Pos	Team	Spr	Sum	Total	Qualification
1	Team Liquid	90	AQ	AQ	2019 League of Legends World Championship
2	Cloud9	40	100	140	2019 League of Legends World Championship
3	Team SoloMid	70	20	90	Advance to Regional Finals
4	Counter Logic Gaming	0	70	70	Advance to Regional Finals
5	Clutch Gaming	0	40	40	Advance to Regional Finals
6	FlyQuest	40	0	40	Advance to Regional Finals
7	OpTic Gaming	0	20	20	
8	Echo Fox	10	0	10	
9	Golden Guardians	10	0	10	
10	100 Thieves	0	0	0	

Source: 2019 LCS Rulebook

== Regional Finals ==
The Regional Finals was a single elimination tournament consisting of the top four teams in the LCS based on championship points that had not directly qualified for the 2019 World Championship. The winner of the Regional Finals advanced to the 2019 World Championship.

Round 1
5	Clutch Gaming	3
6	FlyQuest	1

Round 2
4	Counter Logic Gaming	2
5	Clutch Gaming	3

Final
3	Team SoloMid	2
5	Clutch Gaming	3

== Broadcast ==
In June 2019, Riot announced a streaming partnership with Caffeine for the LCS. This partnership, which was not exclusive, enabled users of Caffeine to co-host the broadcast by streaming it on their individual channels. The agreement, which was not exclusive, was in effect for the remainder of the 2019 LCS season, encompassing the regular season, playoffs, finals, and regional qualifiers. The LCS also broadcast their matches on Twitch, YouTube, and ESPN+.
