= 2018 NA LCS season =

- League: NA LCS
- Sport: League of Legends
- Duration: January 20 – April 8 (Spring); June 16 – September 9 (Summer); September 14–16 (Regional qualifier)
- Teams: 10
- TV partner(s): Twitch, YouTube

Spring
- Champions: Team Liquid
- Runners-up: 100 Thieves
- Top seed: 100 Thieves
- Season MVP: Zaqueri "Aphromoo" Black

Summer
- Champions: Team Liquid
- Runners-up: Cloud9
- Top seed: Team Liquid
- Season MVP: Yiliang "Doublelift" Peng

Regional qualifier
- Winner: Cloud9

NA LCS seasons
- ← 2017 2019 →

The 2018 NA LCS season was the seventh season of the North American League of Legends Championship Series (NA LCS), a professional esports league for the video game League of Legends. The season was divided into two splits: Spring and Summer. The Spring Split began on January 20 and culminated with the playoff finals on April 8, 2018. The Summer Split began on June 16 and culminated with the Spring Split finals on September 9, 2018.

The 2018 season saw a shift in the NA LCS from a promotion and relegation system to a franchised league with ten permanent teams. The buy-in price for existing teams was US$10 million, while new teams incurred an additional $3 million, distributed to replaced teams. Over 100 applications were received, narrowed down to a shortlist, with the final ten franchised teams announced in November 2017. Of the final ten franchised teams, six were previously established in the NA LCS, while four new organizations joined the league.

Team Liquid won the spring split playoffs, qualifying them for the 2018 Mid-Season Invitational. Team Liquid also won the summer split playoffs, directly qualifying them for the 2018 World Championship. 100 Thieves and Cloud9 also qualified for the 2018 World Championship via Championship Points and winning the regional qualifier, respectively.

== Format and changes ==
=== Franchising ===
In June 2017, Riot Games announced that the NA LCS would shift from a promotion and relegation system to franchised league with ten permanent teams beginning in 2018. Each of the ten teams would have guaranteed spots, with the hope to encourage owners to make substantial investments, including the creation of training facilities and improvements in coaching, scouting, and player well-being. Each team was also mandated to maintain an academy squad for emerging talent development. Riot Games also raised the minimum salary for players to US$75,000, with an average annual income for League pros around $150,000. Additionally, a players' association was established to offer financial, legal, and career-building support to players.

The buy-in price for the league was $10 million for existing League of Legends teams, who had previously participated in the League Championship Series or Challenger Series. New teams would be subject to an additional $3 million, which was distributed to the teams that were replaced in the league. The NA LCS received over 100 applications for a spot in the league. Those applications were then narrowed down to a shortlist, nicknamed "phase two", which saw participants travel to Riot Games' Los Angeles office to interview and review their applications.

The ten franchised teams were announced in November 2017. Among the already established teams in the NA LCS were FlyQuest, Team SoloMid, Cloud9, Counter Logic Gaming, Echo Fox, and Team Liquid. The other four existing teams, Immortals, Phoenix1, Team Dignitas and Team EnVyUs, were declined entry into the restructured league. Due to their departure, four new organizations were added to the NA LCS: 100 Thieves, Clutch Gaming, Golden Guardians, and OpTic Gaming.

=== Match length ===
On September 29, 2017, Riot Games announced that the NA LCS would return to a best-of-one format for the 2018 season. The three previous splits employed a best-of-three format and aired two streams simultaneously. According to Riot, the change to a best-of-three format was aimed to increase fan engagement, but its incorporation of simultaneous dual streams to accommodate more games led to a drop in viewership.

== Spring ==
The Spring Split regular season began on January 20 and ended on March 18, 2018. The regular season followed a standard double round-robin format, where each team faced every other team twice. All matches were best-of-one. The top six teams from the regular season advanced to the playoffs, a single-elimination tournament, which ran from March 24 to April 8, 2018. Of the six teams, the top two started in the semifinals, while the bottom four started in the quarterfinals. The winner of the playoffs advanced to the 2018 Mid-Season Invitational.

The Spring Split third place match and final was played at The Fillmore Miami Beach at the Jackie Gleason Theater in Miami, Florida.

=== Regular season ===
Pos	Team	Pld	W	L	PCT	Qualification
1	100 Thieves	19	13	6	.684	Advance to semifinals
2	Echo Fox	19	12	7	.632	Advance to semifinals
3	Team SoloMid	20	13	7	.650	Advance to quarterfinals
4	Team Liquid	20	12	8	.600	Advance to quarterfinals
5	Cloud9	20	12	8	.600	Advance to quarterfinals
6	Clutch Gaming	20	11	9	.550	Advance to quarterfinals
7	Counter Logic Gaming	18	7	11	.389	
8	FlyQuest	18	6	12	.333	
9	OpTic Gaming	18	5	13	.278	
10	Golden Guardians	18	4	14	.222	

Source: LoL Esports (Archived August 27, 2018, at the Wayback Machine)
Rules for classification: 1) Winning percentage; 2) head-to-head record; 3) tiebreaker match(es)

=== Playoffs ===
Quarterfinals
3	Team SoloMid	1
6	Clutch Gaming	3
4	Team Liquid	3
5	Cloud9	0

Semifinals
1	100 Thieves	3
6	Clutch Gaming	2
Top seed selects opponent
2	Echo Fox	1
4	Team Liquid	3

Final
1	100 Thieves	0
4	Team Liquid	3
Third place
2	Echo Fox	3
6	Clutch Gaming	0

=== Awards ===
- Most Valuable Player: Aphromoo, 100 Thieves
- Rookie of the Split: Licorice, Cloud9
- Coach of the Split: Pr0lly, 100 Thieves
- 1st Team All-Pro:
  - T Huni, Echo Fox
  - J Dardoch, Echo Fox
  - M Bjergsen, Team SoloMid
  - B Cody Sun, 100 Thieves
  - S Aphromoo, 100 Thieves
- 2nd Team All-Pro:
  - T Hauntzer, Team SoloMid
  - J Meteos, 100 Thieves
  - M Jensen, Cloud9
  - B Zven, Team SoloMid
  - S Smoothie, Cloud9
- 3rd Team All-Pro:
  - T Ssumday, 100 Thieves
  - J Svenskeren, Cloud9
  - M Febiven, Clutch Gaming
  - B Sneaky, Cloud9
  - S Hakuho, Clutch Gaming

== Summer ==
The Summer Split regular season ran from June 16 to August 19, 2018, and followed the same format as the Spring Split. The top six teams from the summer regular season secured spots in the Summer Split playoffs, which ran from August 25 to September 9, 2018. The playoffs were a single-elimination tournament, with top two teams starting in the semifinals and the following four starting in the quarterfinals. The winner of the summer playoffs directly qualified for the 2018 World Championship.

The Summer Split third place match and final took place at the Oracle Arena in Oakland, California.

=== Regular season ===
Pos	Team	Pld	W	L	PCT	Qualification
1	Team Liquid	18	12	6	.667	Advance to semifinals
2	Cloud9	18	11	7	.611	Advance to semifinals
3	100 Thieves	20	12	8	.600	Advance to quarterfinals
4	Echo Fox	20	11	9	.550	Advance to quarterfinals
5	Team SoloMid	20	11	9	.550	Advance to quarterfinals
6	FlyQuest	20	10	10	.500	Advance to quarterfinals
7	OpTic Gaming	18	9	9	.500	
8	Counter Logic Gaming	18	7	11	.389	
9	Clutch Gaming	18	6	12	.333	
10	Golden Guardians	18	5	13	.278	

Source: LoL Esports (Archived September 10, 2018, at the Wayback Machine)
Rules for classification: 1) Winning percentage; 2) head-to-head record; 3) tiebreaker match(es)

=== Playoffs ===
Quarterfinals
3	100 Thieves	3
6	FlyQuest	0
4	Echo Fox	2
5	Team SoloMid	3

Semifinals
1	Team Liquid	3
3	100 Thieves	1
Top seed selects opponent
2	Cloud9	3
5	Team SoloMid	2

Final
1	Team Liquid	3
2	Cloud9	0
Third place
3	100 Thieves	2
5	Team SoloMid	3

=== Awards ===
- Most Valuable Player: Doublelift, Team Liquid
- Rookie of the Split: Blaber, Cloud9
- Coach of the Split: Reapered, Cloud9
- 1st Team All-Pro:
  - T Ssumday, 100 Thieves
  - J Xmithie, Team Liquid
  - M Jensen, Cloud9
  - B Doublelift, Team Liquid
  - S Aphromoo, 100 Thieves
- 2nd Team All-Pro:
  - T Licorice, Cloud9
  - J Dardoch, Echo Fox
  - M PowerOfEvil, OpTic Gaming
  - B Sneaky, Cloud9
  - S Zeyzal, Cloud9
- 3rd Team All-Pro:
  - T Impact, Team Liquid
  - T Flame, FlyQuest
  - J Santorin, FlyQuest
  - M Bjergsen, Team SoloMid
  - B Zven, Team SoloMid
  - S Olleh, Team Liquid

== Worlds qualification ==
=== Championship Points ===
Pos	Team	Spr	Sum	Total	Qualification
1	Team Liquid	90	AQ	AQ	2018 League of Legends World Championship
2	100 Thieves	70	40	110	2018 League of Legends World Championship
3	Cloud9	10	90	100	Advance to Regional Finals
4	Team SoloMid	10	70	80	Advance to Regional Finals
5	Echo Fox	50	20	70	Advance to Regional Finals
6	Clutch Gaming	30	0	30	Advance to Regional Finals
7	FlyQuest	0	20	20	
8	Counter Logic Gaming	0	0	0	
9	Golden Guardians	0	0	0	
10	OpTic Gaming	0	0	0	

Source: 2018 NA LCS Rulebook

=== Regional qualifier ===
The regional qualifier was a single elimination ladder tournament that ran from September 14 to 16, and consisted of the top four teams in the LCS based on championship points that had not directly qualified for the 2018 World Championship. All matches were best-of-five The winner of the Regional Finals advanced to the 2018 World Championship.

Round 1
5	Echo Fox	3
6	Clutch Gaming	0

Round 2
4	Team SoloMid	3
5	Echo Fox	0

Finals
3	Cloud9	3
4	Team SoloMid	0
