= Clutch Gaming =

American esports organization (2017–2019)

- Short name: CG
- Game: League of Legends
- Founded: 2017
- Folded: 2019
- League: League of Legends Championship Series
- Based in: Houston, Texas
- Owner: Houston Rockets (before June 6, 2019); Harris Blitzer Sports & Entertainment (after June 6, 2019)

Clutch Gaming (CG) was an American esports organization founded by the Houston Rockets in 2017. It had a professional League of Legends team that competed in North America's League of Legends Championship Series (LCS). (Note: Known as the North American League of Legends Championship Series (NA LCS) from 2013 to 2018.) In 2019, Harris Blitzer Sports & Entertainment acquired a majority stake in Clutch Gaming and merged it with Dignitas.

The team saw mixed success in its two years of competition. Although Clutch Gaming was never able to reach the LCS finals, it did qualify for the 2019 World Championship after winning that year's regional qualifier. At the World Championship, Clutch Gaming managed to advance from the play-in stage to the group stage of the main event, but the team was eliminated after failing to pick up a win in what commentators described as a "group of death".

== History ==
=== Founding ===
Riot Games, the creator of League of Legends, announced on May 31, 2017, that the North American League of Legends Championship Series (NA LCS) would discontinue its promotion and relegation system and adopt a franchise model reminiscent of traditional sports leagues by the 2018 season. ESPN reported in October 2017 that Riot Games had accepted an application from the Houston Rockets of the National Basketball Association to join the NA LCS. On November 20, 2017, Rockets owner Tilman Fertitta confirmed his organization's acquisition of a spot in the NA LCS, as well as the team's name: Clutch Gaming.

Clutch Gaming's inaugural roster consisted of Solo, Lira, Febiven, Apollo, and Hakuho. Lira, Apollo, and Hakuho were previously members of Team Envy, which competed in the 2017 NA LCS season but was not accepted into the franchised league. Solo joined from Gold Coin United of the North American Challenger Series, the secondary league of the NA LCS, while Febiven came from H2K of the European League of Legends Championship Series.

=== 2018 season ===
Clutch Gaming finished sixth in the 2018 NA LCS Spring Split regular season with a record of 11 wins and 9 losses, after losing tiebreaker matches against Team SoloMid (TSM) and Cloud9. Despite having what Xing Li of Dot Esports described as a "strong enough start" to the regular season, Clutch Gaming struggled against the top-tier teams of the league, although they managed a win against second-place Echo Fox near the season's end. Clutch Gaming's regular season placement qualified the team for their inaugural playoffs run, with TSM being their first opponents in the quarterfinals. TSM, then the NA LCS's three-time defending champions, were favored by analysts to win the matchup due to their players' experience and the team's longstanding domestic dominance. However, in an upset result, Clutch Gaming defeated TSM 3–1, advancing to the semifinals and knocking TSM out of playoffs; it marked the first time TSM had missed an NA LCS finals. The team's playoff success was nonetheless short-lived. Clutch Gaming lost 2–3 to 100 Thieves in a close semifinals series, with the last game lasting 74 minutes. The team ultimately finished fourth in playoffs after Echo Fox defeated them 3–0 in the third-place decider match.

Clutch Gaming ended the 2018 NA LCS Summer Split regular season in ninth place with a 6–12 record and did not qualify for playoffs. However, the team's fourth-place playoff finish in the previous split earned them a spot in the 2018 NA LCS Regional Qualifier for that year's World Championship (colloquially "Worlds"). Echo Fox once again defeated Clutch Gaming 3–0 in the first round of the regional qualifier, eliminating Clutch Gaming from Worlds contention.

In late November 2018, Clutch Gaming and Echo Fox traded players in preparation for the upcoming 2019 LCS Spring Split (the league had rebranded and removed "NA" from its name). Solo, Apollo, and Hakuho joined Echo Fox, and in return, Clutch Gaming received Huni and Damonte. Piglet and Vulcan, who had been promoted from Clutch Gaming's academy team during the summer regular season, completed the roster.

=== 2019 season ===
Despite victories against playoff contenders, including eventual spring finalists TSM, Clutch Gaming concluded the 2019 LCS Spring Split regular season in ninth place again, this time with a 5–13 record. The team subsequently announced that it would replace Piglet with Cody Sun as the team's starting bot laner for the summer split. During the spring split, Cody Sun had been playing for Clutch Gaming's academy team, but he played for the main team for one weekend's games.

Clutch Gaming's final victory against Golden Guardians at the end of the 2019 LCS Summer Split regular season secured them a spot in playoffs. The team ended the regular season in fifth place with a 9–9 record, avoiding a three-way tie for sixth. In the quarterfinals Clutch Gaming once again defeated TSM 3–1, moving on to the semifinals, where they lost 2–3 to Team Liquid in a close series. Clutch Gaming was then defeated by Counter Logic Gaming (CLG) in the third-place decider match, forcing the team to play through the regional qualifier once again for a chance to qualify for the 2019 World Championship. After defeating FlyQuest and CLG in the first and second rounds of the gauntlet, respectively, Clutch Gaming found themselves facing TSM yet again in the qualifying round. TSM began the series with two victories but were ultimately defeated by Clutch Gaming. With their final win over TSM after running the entire gauntlet, Clutch Gaming qualified for Worlds as the LCS's third seed. It marked not only the team's debut at Worlds but also the individual debuts of Lira, Damonte, and Vulcan.

Clutch Gaming began their Worlds run in the play-in stage, where they were placed in group A with the League of Legends Continental League's Unicorns of Love and the Oceanic Pro League's Mammoth. Group A was locked in a three-way tie after each team defeated one opponent but failed to beat the other in two round robins. Clutch Gaming avoided the first tiebreaker match due to them having the shortest total game time among their victories. The Unicorns of Love defeated Mammoth in the first tiebreaker match but fell to Clutch Gaming in the second, despite previously defeating them twice during the round robins. Clutch Gaming thus emerged as the first seed of their group and advanced to the qualifying round of the play-in stage. Clutch Gaming subsequently defeated Royal Youth of the Turkish Championship League 3–0 to secure a spot in the main event.

For the group stage of the main event, Clutch Gaming was placed in Group C, widely described by commentators as the "group of death" due to it having three regional powerhouses: South Korea's SK Telecom T1, China's Royal Never Give Up, and Europe's Fnatic. Clutch Gaming ended their Worlds run with a 0–6 record in the group stage, failing to pick up a single win in two round robins.

Near the end of 2019, Clutch Gaming merged with Dignitas, an inaugural member of the NA LCS whose application to the franchised LCS had previously been rejected in 2017. Harris Blitzer Sports & Entertainment, the owners of Dignitas, had earlier bought a majority stake in Clutch Gaming for over US$30 million, on June 6, 2019.

== Season-by-season records ==
Year		League of Legends Championship Series						Mid-Season Invitational	World Championship	Ref.
Year		P	W	L	W–L	Pos.	Playoffs	Mid-Season Invitational	World Championship	Ref.
2018	Spring	20	11	9	.550	6th	Semifinals	Did not qualify	Did not qualify	
2018	Summer	18	6	12	.333	9th	Did not qualify	Did not qualify	Did not qualify	
2019	Spring	18	5	13	.278	9th	Did not qualify	Did not qualify	Group stage	
2019	Summer	18	9	9	.500	5th	Semifinals	Did not qualify	Group stage	

== Accomplishments and awards ==
LCS Second-Place Rookie

- Vulcan – Spring 2019

LCS All-Pro Third Team

- Febiven – Spring 2018
- Hakuho – Spring 2018
- Cody Sun – Summer 2019
