= IiTzTimmy =

American Twitch streamer and gamer (born 2000)

iiTzTimmy
- An in 2026
- Born: Timothy An; April 19, 2000 (age 26)

Twitch information
- Channel: iiTzTimmy
- Years active: 2019–present
- Genres: Gaming; Just Chatting
- Games: Apex Legends; Valorant
- Followers: 2.9 million

YouTube information
- Channels: iiTzTimmy; iiTzTimmy Two
- Years active: 2018–present
- Genre: Gaming
- Subscribers: 1.81 million (main channel); 242 thousand (iiTzTimmy Two)
- Views: 413.84 million (main channel); 39.35 million (iiTzTimmy Two)

Esports career information
- Games: Apex Legends; Valorant
- Playing career: 2019–2020, 2023–2025

Team history
- Apex Legends
- 2019–2020: Golden Guardians
- 2023–2024: The Dojo
- 2024: Disguised
- 2024: Moist Esports
- 2024: The Dojo
- 2024–2025: 100 Thieves
- 2025: NRG Esports
- Last updated: September 9, 2025

Timothy An (born April 19, 2000), better known as iiTzTimmy, is an American streamer and retired professional Apex Legends player.

== Early life ==
Timothy An was born on April 19, 2000. He became interested in gaming through playing MapleStory with his brother, and later switched to playing League of Legends and Soldier Front 2.

== Career ==
An, after creating his Twitch channel in 2018, was originally a League of Legends streamer, but switched to Apex Legends after the release of the game in 2019. He played professionally with the Golden Guardians until 2020, when he decided to switch to full-time content creation.

In March 2021, An reached the Masters rank in Apex Legends after climbing from Bronze in just one 33-hour long stream. He has also set the record for the most damage recorded in a single game. In August, he reached the Apex Predator rank from Bronze in a 55-hour stream. He later beat this record in 2024, doing it in 34 hours. An signed to 100 Thieves as a streamer in November 2022.

An returned to professional play in March 2023. With his team, The Dojo, he placed top four in the ALGS: 2023 Championship after making the Last Chance Qualifiers. He became a Red Bull athlete in April 2023. In August, An won the AT&T Annihilator Cup, winning $100,000. In January 2024, he signed with Disguised but moved to Moist Esports in June. An later signed with 100 Thieves as part of their competitive roster in November. In March 2025, he signed with NRG Esports. In July 2025, he announced his retirement from professional play.

== Awards and nominations ==
| Award | Year | Category | Result | Ref. |
|---|---|---|---|---|
| The Streamer Awards | 2021 | Best Valorant Streamer | Won | |
| The Streamer Awards | 2021 | Gamer of the Year | Nominated | |
| The Streamer Awards | 2022 | Best Battle Royale Streamer | Won | |
| The Streamer Awards | 2022 | Gamer of the Year | Nominated | |
| The Streamer Awards | 2023 | Best Battle Royale Streamer | Won | |
| The Streamer Awards | 2024 | Best Battle Royale Streamer | Nominated | |
| The Streamer Awards | 2026 | Gamer of the Year | Pending | |
| Streamy Awards | 2022 | Competitive Gamer | Nominated | |
| Streamy Awards | 2023 | Competitive Gamer | Nominated | |
