= Damonte =

Damonte (/dəˈmɒnteɪ/) is a surname. Notable people with the surname include:

- Israel Damonte (born 1982), Argentine footballer and manager
- Loris Damonte (born 1990), Italian footballer
- Tanner Damonte (born 1997), American League of Legends player and coach
