= Froggen =

Danish professional League of Legends player

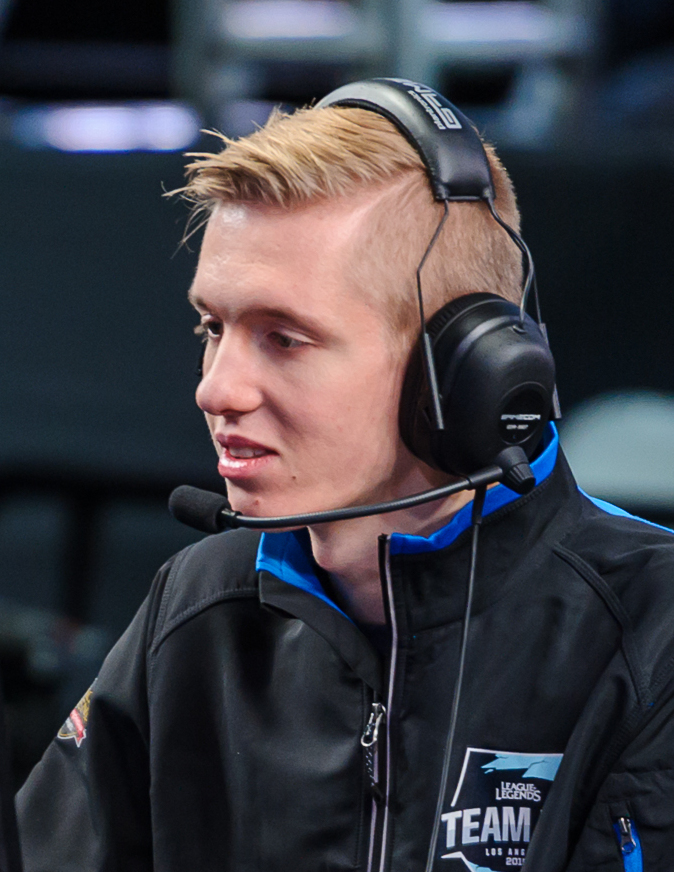
- Hansen in 2015

Personal information
- Name: Henrik Hansen
- Born: 1993 or 1994 (age 32–33); Denmark
- Nationality: Danish

Career information
- Game: League of Legends
- Playing career: 2011–present
- Role: Mid laner

Team history
- 2011: mTw - aL
- 2011–2012: CLG Europe
- 2013: Evil Geniuses
- 2013–2015: Alliance
- 2015: Elements
- 2016–2017: Echo Fox
- 2018: Origen
- 2018–2019: Golden Guardians
- 2019–2020: Dignitas

Henrik Hansen, better known by his in-game name Froggen, is a Danish professional League of Legends player. He is currently signed with Luminosity Gaming as a streamer. Over the course of his career he has also played for CLG.EU, Evil Geniuses, Alliance, Elements, Origen, Echo Fox, the Golden Guardians and Dignitas. Anivia is considered his signature champion.

== Early life ==
Hansen was born in Denmark. Since his childhood, he has played games such as Counter-Strike and Warcraft 3, and was introduced to League of Legends by his brother.

== Career ==
=== 2012 ===
In 2012, Froggen helped CLG.EU finish third at the Season 2 World Championship.

=== 2013 ===
In January, Froggen signed with Evil Geniuses and moved to their gaming house in Berlin. The team qualified for the inaugural spring split of the EU LCS and finished 4th with a 15–13 record in the regular season, qualifying them for the playoffs; in which they finished 3rd.

In December 2013, Froggen joined Alliance, who took Evil Geniuses' spot in the EU LCS after they moved to the NA LCS.

=== 2014 ===
In the 2014 EU LCS Spring Split, Froggen's team Alliance finished 3rd in the regular season with 16–12, qualifying for playoffs and finishing in 4th.

In the 2014 EU LCS Summer Split, Alliance went 21–7 in the regular season and finished in first place, making it to playoffs and staying in first place after defeating Fnatic in the finals and earning themselves an invitation to the 2014 League of Legends World Championship.

At worlds Alliance unexpectedly went 3–3 in their group bracket and failed to make playoffs, ending up in 9–12th place.

=== 2015 ===
After a change to LCS branding rules, Alliance's League of Legends team was required to rebrand itself and leave the organization. The team subsequently rebranded into Elements.

Elements finished 7th in the 2015 EU LCS Spring Split and Summer Split, failing to qualify for playoffs both times.

In November, Elements released all of their players except for Froggen and Nyph.

Froggen was voted by fans to appear in the 2015 All Stars tournament in Los Angeles in December. At the event he had a 1v1 exhibition match against reigning world champion SK Telecom T1's Lee "Faker" Sang-hyeok which he won.

=== 2016 ===
On 2 January he moved to Southern California to join Echo Fox, which had just bought a spot in the North American League of Legends Championship Series.

Echo Fox finished last in the 2016 Summer NA LCS with a 1–17 record, which meant the team could be relegated to the League of Legends Challenger Series. After defeating NRG eSports 3-0 they re-qualified for the 2017 NA LCS Spring Split.

=== 2017 ===
After speculations about Froggen leaving Echo Fox rise, he subsequently released his official statement on YouTube in regards to his termination with the team and shared his perspective outlook for the future in 2018.

=== 2018 ===
It was widely rumored on Twitch and Discord that Froggen would be returning to the League of Legends professional scene in 2018. This was later confirmed by Origen on Twitter on 5 April 2018, as they announce that Froggen will be joining them as their mid laner. Froggen left Origen after their victory in the 2018 European Cup and was subsequently signed by the Golden Guardians on 8 December 2018 as their mid laner.

=== 2019 ===
Froggen then went on to play for Golden Guardians in the NA LCS season 9 finishing 5/6th in the spring split. He would retain his starting spot for summer.

=== 2020 ===
Froggen signed with Dignitas for the 2020 LCS season. In the Spring Split they finished with a record of 8-10, placing just outside of playoffs at seventh. For the summer split, Froggen was benched after six games and moved down to the academy roster. He would then play the rest of the season on Dignitas Academy.

== Tournament results ==
=== CLG.EU ===
- 4th — Season 2 World Championship

=== Evil Geniuses ===
- 3rd — 2013 Spring NA LCS playoffs

=== Alliance ===
- 4th — 2014 Spring EU LCS playoffs
- 1st — 2014 Summer EU LCS playoffs

=== Elements ===
- 7th — 2015 Spring EU LCS

=== Echo Fox ===
- 7th — 2016 Spring NA LCS
- 10th — 2016 Summer NA LCS
- 8th — 2017 Spring NA LCS

=== Origen ===
- 1st — 2018 EU Masters

=== Golden Guardians ===
5th–6th — 2019 Spring LCS 7th – 2019 Summer LCS
