= Febiven =

Dutch retired professional League of Legends player

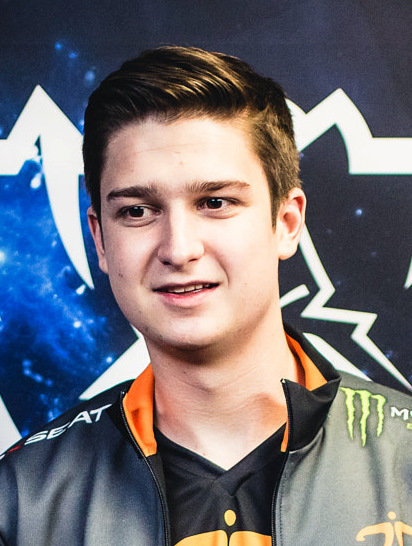
- Diepstraten in 2015

Personal information
- Name: Fabian Diepstraten
- Nationality: Dutch

Career information
- Games: League of Legends
- Role: Mid

Team history
- 2014: Cloud 9 Eclipse
- 2014: H2k-Gaming
- 2015–2016: Fnatic
- 2017: H2k-Gaming
- 2018: Clutch Gaming
- 2019–2020: Misfits Gaming
- 2021: Fnatic Rising
- 2024: TDS (Team du Sud)

Career highlights and awards
- 2× EU LCS champion

Fabian Diepstraten (Dutch pronunciation: [ˈfaːbijɑn ˈdipstraːtə(n)]), better known as Febiven, is a Dutch professional League of Legends player, currently playing for Team du Sud (LFL). During his career which spanned seven years, he played for several teams, including Misfits Gaming, Clutch Gaming, Fnatic, H2k-Gaming, and Cloud9 Eclipse.

== Career ==
Febiven first joined Cloud9 Eclipse in the EU CS in January 2014, and this was the start of his eSports career. The team failed to qualify for the EU LCS, however during that time Febiven had attracted the attention of several large organisations. In May 2014, Febiven left Cloud 9 Eclipse to join team H2k-Gaming.

On 7 January 2015, H2k-Gaming announced Febiven's departure. He then joined the reinvented team of Fnatic and his performance increased drastically. With a 7.8 KDA and first place in the EU LCS Championships, he has become one of the best-known mid laners in Europe.

In December 2016, Febiven returned to H2K, where he finished 6th in the Spring Split, and 4th in the Summer Split, missing a trip to worlds.

On 23 June 2016 he and teammate Rekkles broke the creep score (CS) world record with 858 minions killed in a game.

On 2 December 2017 Clutch Gaming announced that he would be the starting mid laner for the team for the Season 8 NA LCS Spring Split.

After a year in NA LCS, Febiven has returned to his home soil in Europe where he joined Misfits Gaming.

== Personal life ==
Febiven appeared on the cover of Vogue Netherlands in March 2016.

== Tournaments results ==
=== Fnatic ===
- 1st — 2015 EU LCS Spring
- 3rd–4th — 2015 Mid-Season Invitational
- 1st — 2015 EU LCS Summer
- 3rd–4th — 2015 World Championship
- 3rd–4th — IEM X Cologne
- 3rd — 2016 EU LCS Spring playoffs
- 2nd — IEM X World Championship
