= Aphromoo =

American League of Legends player

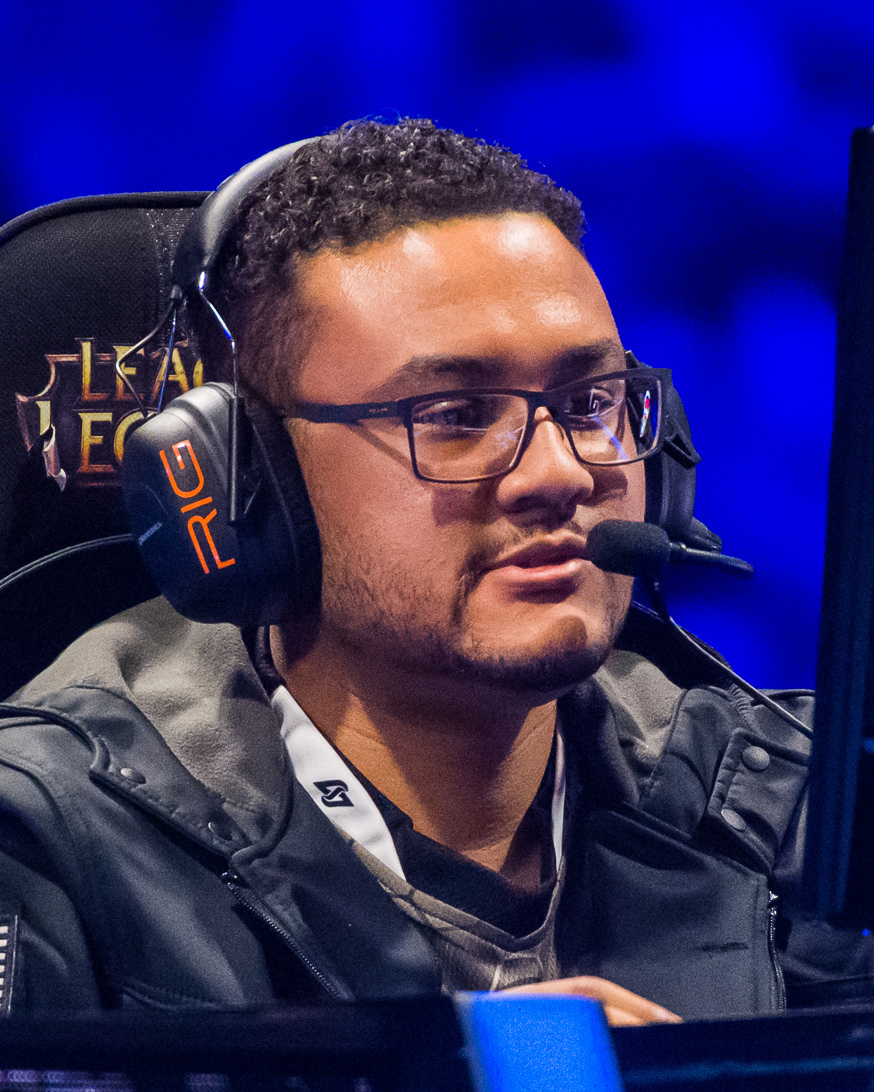
- Aphromoo at the 2016 NA LCS Spring Finals

Personal information
- Name: Zaqueri Black
- Born: September 8, 1992 (age 34)
- Nationality: American

Career information
- Game: League of Legends
- Playing career: 2011–2022
- Role: Support

Team history
- 2011: Team OG Sout Rez
- 2011–2012: v8 eSports
- 2012: Epik Gamer
- 2012: Team SoloMid Evo
- 2012: mTw North America
- 2012: Monomaniac Ferus
- 2012: Team FeaR
- 2012–2013: Counter Logic Gaming
- 2013: Team Curse
- 2014–2017: Counter Logic Gaming
- 2017–2019: 100 Thieves
- 2019–2021: Dignitas
- 2021–2022: FlyQuest

Career highlights and awards
- 2× LCS champion (2015 Summer, 2016 Spring); 1× LCS MVP (2018 Spring)

Zaqueri Black (born September 8, 1992), better known by his in-game name Aphromoo, is an American retired professional League of Legends player. Aphromoo won the 2018 Spring Split MVP award, the first time a support player had received the title.

== Career ==
Aphromoo played for a number of teams in the early years of professional League from 2011 to 2012. During this period, he also played the AD Carry bottom lane position. He still rarely subs over to this role, but switched to Support in 2013 when he joined Counter Logic Gaming (CLG), the team he would be closely identified with for a long time. Aphromoo played for CLG in the spring split of 2013 as well as from 2014 to 2017, during which he supported AD Carries Doublelift and later Stixxay. CLG would go on to win the 2015 NALCS Summer Split as well as the 2016 NALCS Spring Split. CLG also attended the League of Legends World Championship in 2015 and 2016, albeit with mixed results.

After a weaker performance for CLG in 2017, where CLG lost out the 3rd and final North American invitation to Worlds to Cloud9 in a tiebreaker match, Aphromoo left CLG in November 2017. He joined 100 Thieves, a new team made after the NALCS adopted a new franchising system. Aphromoo's veteran leadership and strong individual performance was credited as major reasons behind 100 Thieves' success; they placed 1st in the NALCS in regular season, and took 2nd place overall after the playoffs. This helped Aphromoo win the MVP award, despite the position of Support usually being neglected in this vote since the MVP award started in 2014.

Aphromoo announced his retirement from professional League in January 2023. He held the record for most number of LCS games played from August 2022–March 2023; he had slightly nudged ahead of WildTurtle and finished the 2022 season with 597 games played. Bjergsen took the title from him during the 2023 season, and WildTurtle also returned to edge ahead of him on the all-time leaderboard.

== Tournament results ==
=== Counter Logic Gaming ===
- 5th–6th — 2015 Spring NA LCS playoffs (3rd in regular season)
- 1st — 2015 Summer NA LCS playoffs (2nd in regular season)
- 12th–13th — 2015 League of Legends World Championship
- 1st — 2016 Spring NA LCS playoffs (2nd in regular season)
- 2nd — 2016 Mid-Season Invitational
- 4th — 2016 NA LCS Summer playoffs + regular season
- 9th–12th — 2016 World Championship
- 5th–6th — 2017 NA LCS Spring playoffs (4th in regular season)
- 3rd — 2017 NA LCS Summer playoffs + regular season

=== 100 Thieves ===
- 2nd — 2018 NA LCS Spring playoffs (1st in regular season)
- 4th — 2018 NA LCS Summer playoffs (3rd in regular season)
- 9th–12th — 2018 World Championship
