= Vote center =

Polling place serving multiple precincts

In the United States of America, a vote center, sometimes known as a super precinct, is a polling place that combines multiple precincts allowing voters to choose at which location to vote regardless of their home address. Voter centers can be used to allow voters to choose from any polling place within a larger jurisdiction, commonly county. Vote centers were first used in Larimer County, Colorado, USA.

Vote centers can reduce the number of polling places required per election theoretically reducing costs.
