= Piglet (gamer) =

South Korean League of Legends player

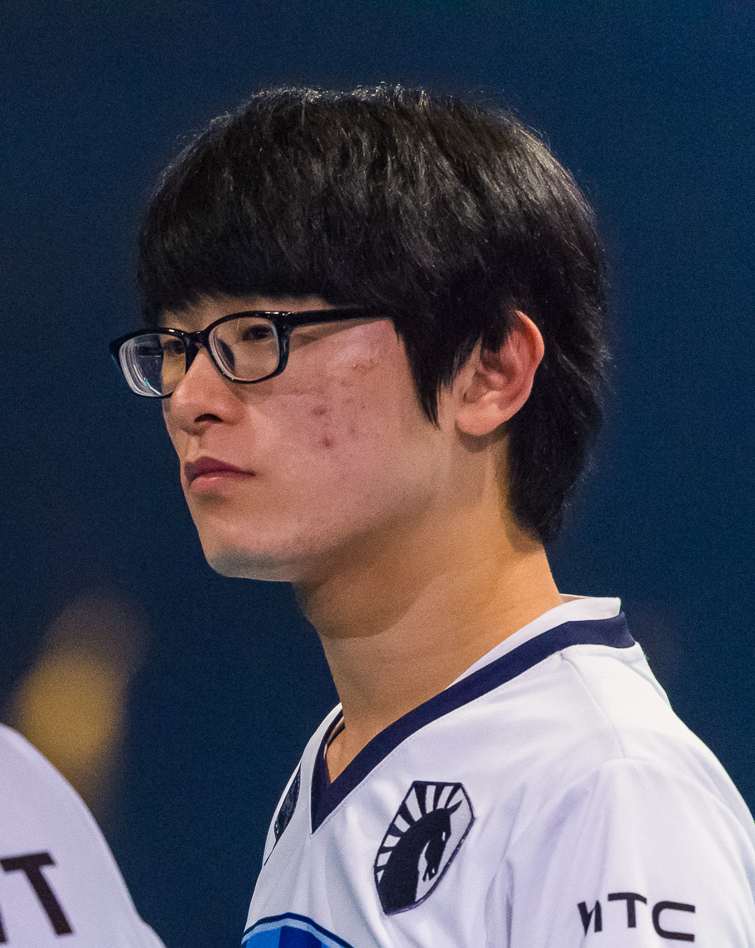
- Chae in 2016

Personal information
- Name: 채광진 (Chae Gwang-jin)
- Nationality: South Korean

Career information
- Games: League of Legends
- Playing career: 2013–2019
- Coaching career: 2021–present

Team history
- 2013–2014: SK Telecom T1 K
- 2014–2015: Team Curse
- 2015–2017: Team Liquid
- 2018–2019: Clutch Gaming

Career highlights and awards
- World champion (2013); 2x LCK champion; All-Star Invitational champion (2014); NLB champion (2014); 1× LCS First Team All–Pro

Chae Gwang-jin (Korean: 채광진), better known as Piglet, is a South Korean former professional League of Legends player, and previous coach for T1 Academy. Piglet won the Season 3 World Championship in 2013 with LCK team SK Telecom T1.

== Career ==
=== 2013 ===
Before Piglet played League of Legends, he was a semi-professional player of StarCraft. His family was strongly against him becoming a pro gamer, so he lied that he quit the game. Meanwhile, he went to PC bangs to play and practice. However, he felt that he didn't play well enough and gave up the idea of being a pro. After playing League of Legends Piglet wondered if it would also have a pro scene, and when he saw people playing the game on TV his interest in becoming a pro reignited. When the South Korean servers of League of Legends opened, he began to practice more. Eventually Piglet received offers from several teams, but he decided to only contact SK Telecom T1 (SKT). In February 2013, Piglet joined the newly created SK Telecom T1 #2 after successfully passing their tryout test.

Piglet and his team's playing debut was in OLYMPUS Champions Spring 2013, which put them in Group A together with CJ Entus Blaze, KT Rolster A, MVP Blue, MVP Ozone and NaJin Sword. The rookie team surprised by finishing at the top ahead of tournament favourites CJ Entus Blaze. In the quarter-finals, the team faced NaJin Shield which they swept 3–0, putting them in a semi-final against MVP Ozone. SKT was a strong favorite to win, but they were upset by MVP and suffered a defeat. In the following 3rd place match SKT beat CJ Entus Frost 3–0.

Later the same month, SKT participated in the AMD-INVEN GamExperience, where they once again were knocked out in the semi-finals by MVP OZone, leading to a 3rd–4th-place finish. Shortly after, the SK Telecom T1 organization released SK Telecom T1 #1 and renamed SK Telecom T1 #2 to simply SK Telecom T1. Following this, the team competed in HOT6iX Champions Summer 2013. There they once again finished at the top of their group with a clean 3–0 record. Coming of a 3–0 win in the quarter-finals, the team found themselves once again against MVP Ozone. This time however, they beat MVP, and went on to face KT Rolster Bullets in the final. In what has been described as among the greatest series of the game's history, SKT defeated KT in a 3–2 reverse sweep and secured their position in the regional finals for a chance at competing in the Season 3 World Championship. There they beat KT again and thus earned Korea's final seed in the tournament.

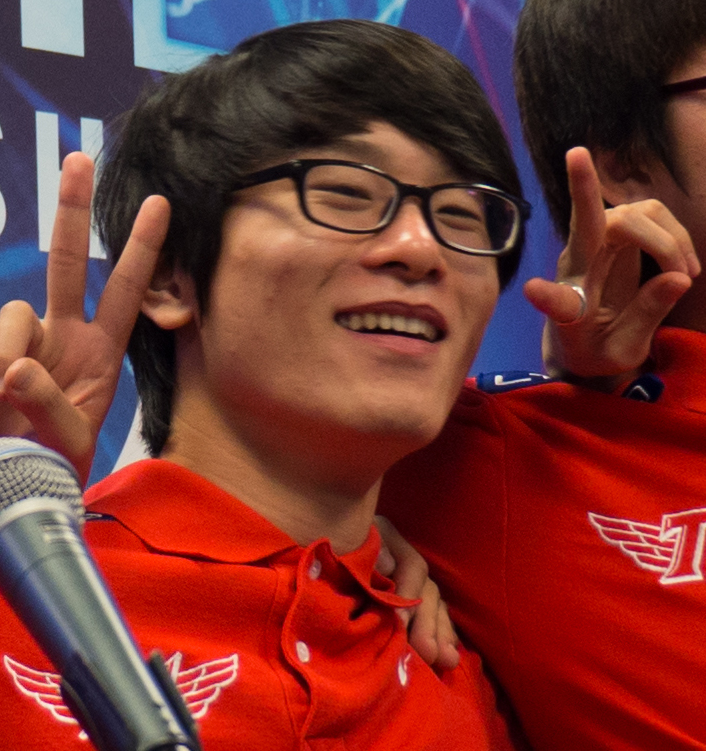
Piglet at the League of Legends Season 3 World Championship

At the Season 3 World Championship in Los Angeles, California, SKT only lost one game in the group stages to Chinese team OMG to tie for first place. They then swept the Taiwanese team Gamania Bears 2–0 in the quarter-finals to face off against NaJin Black Sword in the semi-finals.In the semifinals, they faced Najin Black Sword and won with a score of 3-2. Up against China's Royal Club, the team didn't lose a single game and were crowned the Season 3 World Champions.

=== 2014 ===
Piglet and SK Telecom continued their domination by winning OGN Winter undefeated. In the interview that followed, Piglet famously cried because he believed that opposing ADC 'Imp' had played better than him. Despite SK Telecom looking to go for their second consecutive win, they had plenty of issues which started when support Poohmandu stepped down and replaced with Wraith. SK Telecom struggled to get out of groups in Spring and Summer but their dominance internationally continued when they won 'All-Stars' undefeated. Poohmandu came back in Summer but most players had slumped and they lost to Najin in the regional qualifiers.

=== 2015 ===
Piglet was released from SKT after sister teams were disbanded, and SKT went with Bang as their starting ADC. Piglet was receiving offers from nearly every team around the world, but no Korean teams because of his infamous toxicity which was a reason why he was released from SKT. Piglet joined Team Curse, who then renamed to Team Liquid, a team renowned for only making fourth. The transfer shocked all fans as many believed he would join teams with championship victories. Hopes were high for Piglet but his little knowledge in English led to poor results and he was replaced by Keith. Team Liquid brought back Piglet after week 7 and they scraped playoffs. Team Liquid entered playoffs with little hopes but surprisingly went 3–0 against CLG, who barely missed the playoff bye. They then took a 2–0 lead against Cloud9, looking poised to make their first finals in the organisations history but were reverse-swept and played in the 3-4th place match. Team Liquid beat Team Impulse 3–2, breaking the fourth place curse.

In Summer, Team Liquid made first in the regular season and Piglet cemented himself as the best ADC in the region. They looked to finally make Worlds but they lost 3–1 against TSM in the semi-finals and then lost in the regional qualifier to a surprising Cloud9. Rumours circulated that Piglet would leave the team but he stayed.

=== 2016 ===
Despite rumours that he would leave, Piglet stayed on Team Liquid with Fenix but the rest of their roster looked bleak. Quas was suspended, and then kicked for behaviour issues, IWillDominate planned to retire and Xpecial was kicked from the team. This put a strain on Team Liquid and they picked up Lourlo, an NA CS top laner who looked poor on CLG Black, Smoothie, a support who seemed to have potential but was relegated on TDK and Team Liquid also picked up a full challenger team, planning to split times between them. Team Liquid played one game against Renegades, but suffered defeat, and they then announced IWillDominate was retiring and Smoothie was benched. Their replacements were Dardoch and Matt. Dardoch was a very hyped up jungler and Matt was a fairly unknown player who was known for being a Thresh and Bard player, and made challenger playing on the NA server in Hawaii with high ping. After a rough start, Team Liquid were able to bring it back to a fourth-place finish with Piglet touted as the best player in North America with Huni and Reignover by fans. Team Liquid won 3–0 against NRG and many pro-players were impressed by their dominant scrims and said they could win the split. However, Team Liquid lost 3–2 to CLG, which ended with a very close game 5, decided by Darshan and Huhi double-teleporting onto the same minion, tricking Piglet into thinking it was one person. They then lost to Immortals.

In Summer, Dardoch was suspended for behaviour issues, by clashing with Locodoco and Piglet. Team Liquid went on without Dardoch, but after a poor start, Dardoch was brought back and Piglet voluntarily moved to their Challenger team. Team Liquid and Team Liquid Academy had impressive splits, but Team Liquid had a rough end to the regular season after they lost to CLG while having a 10k gold lead, which angered Dardoch as they lost their shot of making third. Team Liquid Academy made it to five games against the C9 team (who infamously put together the roster with veterans, to make a million dollars by selling the slot) but Piglet accidentally locked in Rammus and they lost the series. They then played Echo Fox but lost in game 5, ending their season without making it into the LCS.

=== 2017 ===
Many believed that Piglet would finally move on from Team Liquid, and have a shot at making Worlds. He was rumoured to join Korean teams, as well as recent NA LCS champions, TSM and also Worlds semi-finalist team H2k. Team Liquid recently had an influx in cash and rumours circulated that they would acquire Smeb, Reignover, Adrian and some believed they would get Pobelter. However, when the ROX Tigers lost to SKT at Worlds again, Smeb joined KT Rolster, which was put together for the sole purpose of beating SKT. Despite Team Liquid's claim that they would completely revamp the roster in order to win an LCS championship, they kept a lot of the same players and brought in Reignover, whose salary was estimated to be $2 million, and Goldenglue, who had multiple shots at making LCS but was never up to the level. Team Liquid also brought back Piglet and many believed that Goldenglue would step up and Piglet would carry. However, Team Liquid did very poorly in the regular season as Piglet looked nothing like his former self and Goldenglue continued to not look up to an acceptable standard. When IEM Katowice took place, Team Liquid decided to bench Goldenglue and put Piglet mid. Team Liquid won their first series against IMT with Piglet smashing Pobelter but they failed to meet expectations despite Piglet looking better than Goldenglue. They then brought in Doublelift, who came back after taking the split off. Doublelift was able to look good but Piglet, Matt and Reignover continued to struggle. Team Liquid placed ninth and forced to play in the promotion tournament. Team Liquid had a 2–0 lead against GCU but were nearly reverse-swept again but Piglet stepped up in Game 5 and Team Liquid made it back into the LCS.

Team Liquid did not make any roster changes for Summer split, angering fans as they were not happy with Team Liquid's poor performance. Team Liquid continued to do poorly but were able to acquire CLG's Dardoch and LCK veteran Mickey to join their squad. Despite them not being able to avoid relegations, they were able to make it back into the LCS with a 3–0 win over eUnited and a reverse sweep against Phoenix1.

=== 2018 ===
Despite rumors of Piglet rejoining the LCK, he stayed in America to play for Clutch Gaming's Academy squad. Due to family issues, Piglet and his squad failed to make playoffs with a record of 8–10 in the spring split.

During the 2018 Spring split, Piglet was a member of the Academy Team, but played several games on the main roster in July. The academy team went 10-8 and were the 4th seed for the Academy Championship Series (the Academy Version of Worlds), but lost to FlyQuest Academy 2–3.

=== 2019 ===
In December 2019, he announced his retirement from professional League of Legends.

== Tournament results ==
2013
Date	Event	Placing	Final game		
2013-06-05	OLYMPUS Champions Spring 2013	(bronze) 3rd	SK Telecom T1 #2	0	CJ Entus Frost
2013-06-29	AMD-INVEN GamExperience	(bronze) SF	SK Telecom T1 #2	0-2	MVP Ozone
2013-08-31	HOT6iX Champions Summer 2013	(gold) 1st	SK Telecom T1	3-2	KT Rolster Bullets
2013-10-04	Season 3 World Championship	(gold) 1st	SK Telecom T1	3-0	Royal Club

2014
Date	Event	Placing	Final game		
2014-01-25	PANDORA.TV Champions Winter 2013–2014	(gold) 1st	SK Telecom T1 K	3-1	Samsung Galaxy Ozone
2014-05-11	All-Star Paris 2014 Invitational	(gold) 1st	SK Telecom T1 K	3-0	OMG
2014-05-14	bigfile NLB Spring 2014	(bronze) 3rd	SK Telecom T1 K	3-0	KT Rolster Bullets
2014-06-18	SK Telecom LTE-A LoL Masters 2014	(silver) 2nd	SK Telecom T1	0-3	Samsung Galaxy
2014-08-09	ITENJOY NLB Summer 2014	(gold) 1st	SK Telecom T1 K	3-0	NaJin Black Sword

2015
Date	Event	Placing	Final game		
2015-04-18	2015 NA LCS Spring	(bronze) 3rd	Team Liquid	3-2	Team Impulse
2015-08-22	2015 NA LCS Summer	(bronze) 3rd	Team Liquid	3-1	Team Impulse
2015-12-13	2015 All-Star Los Angeles	(gold) 1st	Team Fire	1-0	Team Ice

=== Individual awards ===
Year	Award	Category	Result	Ref.
2014	Korea e-Sports Awards 2013	Best ADC	Won	
2015	LCS 2015 Summer Split Awards	North America MVP	3rd	
2015	LCS 2015 Summer Split Awards	North America All Pro 1st Team – ADC	Won	
