= Licorice (gamer) =

Canadian League of Legends player

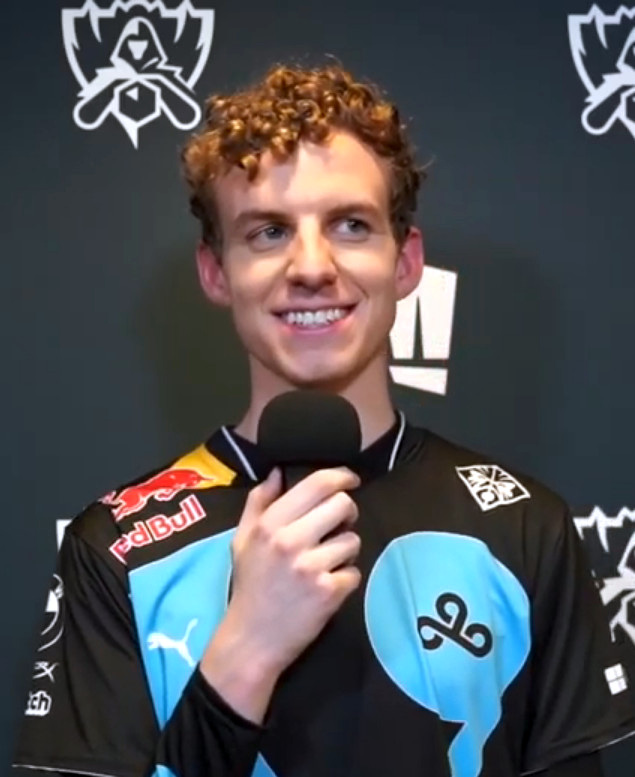
- Ritchie in 2019

Personal information
- Name: Eric Ritchie
- Born: 1997 or 1998 (age 28–29)
- Nationality: Canadian

Current team
- Team: Lyon
- Role: Top laner
- Game: League of Legends
- League: LTA North

Team history
- 2016: Cloud9 Challenger
- 2016–2017: Team eUnited
- 2018–2020: Cloud9
- 2020: FlyQuest
- 2021–2023: Golden Guardians
- 2024: Dignitas
- 2025–present: Lyon

Career highlights and awards
- LCS champion (2020 Spring); LCS Rookie of the Split (2018 Spring); 4× LCS First-Team All Pro; 2× LCS Second-Team All Pro; 1× LCS Most Improved Player

Eric Ritchie, better known as Licorice, is a Canadian professional League of Legends player currently playing for Lyon in the League of Legends Championship of The Americas (LTA) North Conference. Prior to competing in the League Championship Series (LCS), the predecessor to the LTA, Ritchie played for LCS Challenger teams, such as Cloud9 Challenger and Team eUnited. Ritchie signed with Cloud9 ahead of the 2018 NA LCS season; in his rookie season, he was won the league's Rookie of the Split award and reached the semifinals at the 2018 League of Legends World Championship. He made his second World Championship appearance in 2019, and in 2020, he won the LCS championship. After six splits with the team, ahead of the 2021 season, Ritchie was traded to FlyQuest. He was transferred to the Golden Guardians in the middle of the 2021 Summer split, before moving to Dignitas (in the Summer 2024 split) after Golden Guardians dissolved at the end of 2023. Upon the LCS becoming the LTA North, Ritchie moved to Lyon, the only Latin America-based team in the conference.

== Professional career ==
=== Pre–LCS ===
Early in his career, in 2016, Ritchie played for Cloud9 Challenger in the League of Legends Challenger Series, as a substitute. In December 2016, Challengers Series team eUnited bought out Ritchie's contract from Cloud9.

=== Cloud9 ===
In late 2017, Ritchie signed with Cloud9, as their starting top laner on the main roster for the 2018 NA LCS season. He entered his rookie season as the replacement for Cloud9's former top laner Jeong "Impact" Eon-yeong and made his LCS debut in January 2018. At the end of the Spring Split, Ritchie won the league's Rookie of the Split award. In the Summer Split, Ritchie and Cloud9 reached the semifinals, where they faced Team Liquid; however, they lost the match, 0–3. Cloud9 qualified for the 2018 World Championship as North America's third seed, where Ritchie helped the team reach their best international finish in the organization's history, reaching the semifinals. At the end of the year, Ritchie was invited to the 2018 All-Star Event as one of three North American representatives.

The following season, Ritchie was named to the 2019 LCS Spring Split All-Pro first team. Ritchie missed two weeks of the 2019 Summer Split due to a wrist injury, however despite the missed games, he was named to the LCS All-Pro second team at the end of the split. Cloud9 reached the 2019 LCS Summer Split finals, marking the second LCS finals appearance for Ritchie; the team lost to Team Liquid in the finals by a score of 2–3. Cloud9 qualified for the 2019 World Championship, marking the second time Ritchie had attended the World Championship.

In the 2020 Spring Split, Ritchie and Cloud9 finished the regular season with a 17–1 record, tying an LCS record. The team went on to sweep FlyQuest, 3–0, in the LCS finals, giving Ritchie his first LCS title. Ritchie, alongside the entire Cloud9 roster, was named to the All–Pro first team, although Ritchie was the only member of Cloud9 to not be in the top-10 voting for the Spring Split Most Valuable Player award. The following split, Ritchie was named to the LCS All-Pro first team and was a nominee for the splits MVP award. However Cloud9 fell early in the playoffs, and for the first time in his LCS career, Ritchie did not qualify for Worlds.

After the 2020 season, Cloud9 announced that they would be retaining their entire roster for the 2021 LCS season; however, after LEC Star Luka "Perkz" Perković became available for trade, he was subsequently acquired by Cloud9 in October 2020, and Academy player Fudge was promoted to the starting lineup, replacing Ritchie in the toplane.

=== FlyQuest ===
In November 2020, FlyQuest bought out Ritchie's contract from Cloud9 for a reported US$1.5 million. Through the 2021 Spring Split and half of the 2021 Summer Split, FlyQuest amassed only a 9–24 record, with Ritchie posting the worst kill-death ratio among all LCS players up until July in the Summer Split.

=== Golden Guardians ===
In July 2021, FlyQuest sold Ritchie's contract to Golden Guardians, who had a 8–25 record at that point in the season. At the time of signing, Golden Guardians also agreed to extend his contract through the 2023 season. Golden Guardians had an improved win rate after the acquisition of Ritchie, finishing the season with a 14–31 record.

=== Dignitas ===
After the 2023 season, Golden Guardians left League of Legends, and esports as a whole, releasing Ritchie in the process. Ritchie would not be signed by a team for the 2024 first split, but signed with Dignitas on May 7, in time for the Summer split. Dignitas would finish 5th in that split, failing to qualify for the 2024 World Championship in the final LCS split.

=== Lyon ===
On December 23, 2024, Ritchie was announced as the top laner for Lyon, a team formed as a merger between former LLA teams Rainbow7 and Six Karma, in the newly-formed LTA North Conference (which replaced the LCS).
