= 100 Thieves =

American lifestyle brand and gaming organization

100 Thieves, LLC
- Type: Private
- Industry: Esports; Lifestyle; Clothing
- Founded: November 20, 2017; 8 years ago
- Headquarters: Los Angeles, California, U.S.
- Key people: President: Jacob Toft-Anderson; COO: Julie Van
- Revenue: ▲US$38 million (2021)
- Total equity: ▲US$460 million (2022)
- Owners: Matthew "Nadeshot" Haag; Dan Gilbert; Drake; Scooter Braun; Rachell "Valkyrae" Hofstetter; Jack "CouRageJD" Dunlop; Jack "NiceWigg" Martin
- Divisions: Apex Legends; Call of Duty; Counter-Strike 2; Marvel Rivals; Rainbow Six Siege; Valorant
- Website: 100thieves.com

100 Thieves, LLC (abbreviated 100T) is an American lifestyle brand and gaming organization based in Los Angeles, California, founded in 2017 by Matthew "Nadeshot" Haag. The organization competes in several video games, including Apex Legends, Call of Duty, Counter-Strike 2, Rainbow Six Siege, Marvel Rivals, and Valorant.

They currently operate three franchise teams, which compete in the Valorant Champions Tour (VCT), Apex Legends Global Series (ALGS) (branded as Crazy Thieves), and the Call of Duty League (CDL) (branded as Los Angeles Thieves).

== History ==
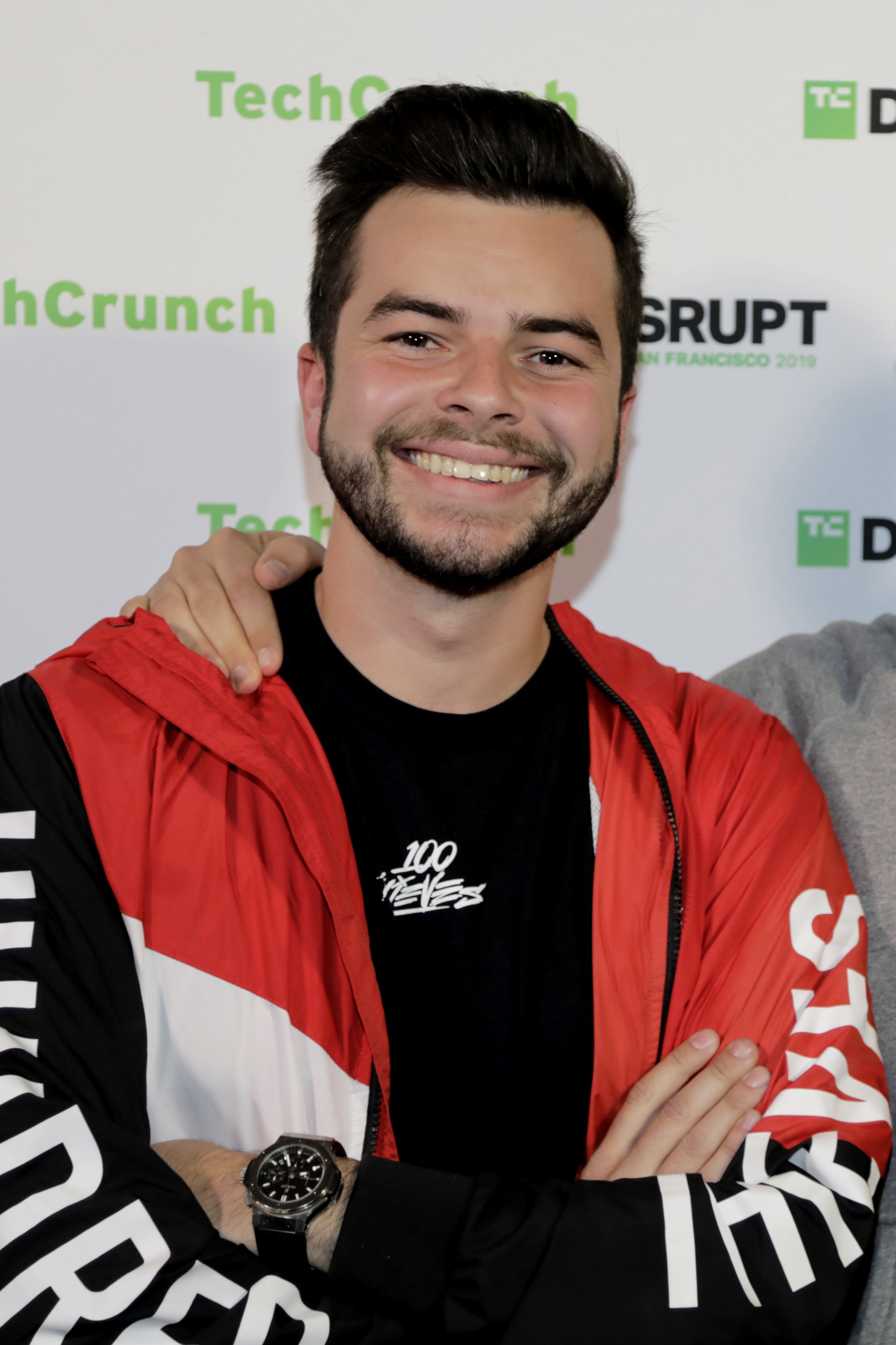
Founder, co-owner, and former CEO of 100 Thieves Matthew "Nadeshot" Haag

100 Thieves was founded in 2017 by Matthew "Nadeshot" Haag, a former OpTic Gaming Call of Duty team captain, (MLG) X Games gold medalist, and 2014 Esports Athlete of the year. In November 2017, 100 Thieves received a multimillion-dollar investment from Cleveland Cavaliers and Quicken Loans owner Dan Gilbert allowing the company to expand into a full-fledged esports organization.

On October 23, 2018, 100 Thieves announced that they finished their Series A funding round co-led by Scooter Braun and Drake, who both became co-owners when they raised $25 million. Included in this round was Sequoia Capital, Ludlow Ventures, Courtside Ventures, WndrCo, Marc Benioff, Drew Houston, Green Bay Ventures, Tao Capital and Advancit Capital. Their Series B funding round on July 16, 2019, was led by Artist Capital Management which raised $35 million. Included in this round is Aglae Ventures, Groupe Arnault (controlling shareholder of Louis Vuitton Moet Hennessy).

In March 2021, 100 Thieves signed a sponsorship deal with Truly Seltzer and Twisted Tea. They acquired gaming peripheral company Higround in October 2021, marking their first acquisition. On December 2, 2021, 100 Thieves announced their Series C funding round, which raised $60 million.

In May 2022, 100 Thieves announced its intentions to publish a video game. It hired former Telltale Games CEO Pete Hawley as its chief product officer to set up a studio. In July, more than 10 members of 100 Thieves' content team were laid off. Nadeshot launched his own energy drink, called Juvee, on October 4.

In January 2023, around 30 employees were laid off, including several lead staff members. That November, 100 Thieves announced it was laying off 20% of its workforce, affecting employees at its game studio and energy drink brand. These business units would also be spun off as separate companies in order to focus on esports and apparel.

On May 6, 2024, the Esports World Cup Foundation, funded by the Saudi Arabia Public Investment Fund and organizers of the Esports World Cup tournament series, announced the 30 organizations (known in the ESWC as Clubs) who would make up the Club Support Program, with 100 Thieves being one of them. This program gives teams a one-time six-figure stipend if an organization is willing to enter new esports as well as additional funding each year if they drive viewership and fan engagement to the Esports World Cup. In December 2024, Nadeshot revealed that he would be taking a step back from 100 Thieves to pursue full-time content creation.

In September 2025, Nadeshot confirmed that he is no longer the CEO of 100 Thieves and had stepped down from the position sometime between 2023 and 2024, but remains involved with the organization in other roles.

== Divisions ==
=== Apex Legends ===
In February 2019, 100 Thieves announced their entrance in the Apex Legends competitive scene, signing Connor "Gigz" White, Justin "Teenage" Phipps, and Isiah "Lifted" Slowik as their first roster. In August 2019, 100 Thieves announced Justin "JP2" Pate as their fourth roster member. In the same month, 100 Thieves announced their exit from the Apex Legends scene, releasing their entire roster.

In October 2021, 100 Thieves returned to Apex Legends, signing the roster of Brendan "Onmuu" Pode, Alex "scuwry" Scala, and Nicholas "Vein" Hobbs. In February 2022, the team released Vein and signed Alan "Vaxlon" Gonzalez, with Tyler "Sickks" Clark joining later on as their new head coach. The team placed 3rd in the 2022 Apex Legends Global Series World Championship. In September 2023, 100 Thieves released their entire roster.

In November 2024, 100 Thieves announced the roster of Tyler "Dezignful" Gardner, Noyan "Genburten" Ozkose, and 100 Thieves content creator Timothy "iiTzTimmy" An, with Deston "Bronzey" Nguyen as the head coach. After being eliminated in the group stage of the 2024 Apex Legends Global Series World Championship, Dezignful announced that he would be exploring his options for next season.

In March 2025, 100 Thieves announced the departures of Dezingful and iiTzTimmy and announced the signings of Josue "Phony" Ruiz and Evan "Verhulst" Verhulst to join Genburten for the 2025 season.

In September 2025, Bronzey stepped down as head coach and was replaced by Balvarine.

In January 2026, 100 Thieves announced a collaboration with the Japanese esports organization Crazy Raccoon, branding the team as the "Crazy Thieves" for the Year 5 Championship. The following month, Balvarine would step down as the team's head coach and was replaced by Daniel "Nihil" Freudenthal. In March 2026, the team added Marco "Stuhni" Paramo as a substitute. In July 2026, Verhulst was released amd Israel "Koyful" Lawrence joined a month later.

==== Current roster ====
Crazy Thieves Apex Legends roster
Players
Coaches

Handle	Name	Nationality
Genburten	Ozkose, Noyan	Australia
Koyful	Lawrence, Israel	United States
Phony	Ruiz, Josue	United States
Stuhni	Paramo, Marco	United States

Head coach

Luca "Liuq" Andenna

Legend:
- (I) Inactive
- (S) Suspended
- Substitute
- (injured) Injury / Illness

Latest roster transaction: September 3, 2026.

=== Call of Duty ===
==== 2019 season ====
The team started the season off signing the team of Kenneth "Kenny" Williams, Maurice "Fero" Henriquez, Sam "Octane" Larew, Austin "SlasheR" Liddicoat, and Ian "Enable" Wyatt. They placed 9th–12th at CWL Las Vegas 2019, qualifying for the Pro League Qualifiers and for the Pro League. After this, they had to re-evaluate the roster, and acquired Preston "Priestahh" Greiner and head coach James "Crowder" Crowder on loans from FaZe Clan, with Fero getting benched. At CWL Fort Worth 2019, the team finished 4th losing to Team Reciprocity, citing medical issues with player Priestahh and being replaced by Fero. At CWL London 2019, the team won the organization's first trophy. At CWL Anaheim 2019, the team won the organization's second trophy. After the Pro League, 100 Thieves finished second in Division B, qualifying for Pro League playoffs. At the Pro League Playoffs, the team placed 5th–6th, losing to Gen.G esports. In the 2019 Call of Duty World Championship, 100 Thieves finished second, with a loss to eUnited.

==== Los Angeles Thieves ====
After initially announcing their intention to not join the Call of Duty League in 2019, 100 Thieves announced in November 2020 that they would enter the league as the "Los Angeles Thieves" after acquiring OpTic Gaming's slot. In the 2022 season, the Los Angeles Thieves defeated the Atlanta FaZe to the win the 2022 Call of Duty League World Championship, bringing the organization their first ever world championship.

==== Current roster ====
Los Angeles Thieves roster
Players
Coaches

Handle	Name	Nationality
aBeZy	Pharris, Tyler	United States
DK	K, Dayton	Wales
Envoy	Hannon, Dylan	United States
Ghosty	Rothe, Daniel	United States

Head coach

Shane "ShAnE" McKerral

Legend:
- (I) Inactive
- (S) Suspended
- Substitute
- (injured) Injury / Illness

Latest roster transaction: November 4, 2026.

=== Counter-Strike 2 ===
On November 10, 2025, 100 Thieves announced that their entry into the Counter-Strike 2 competitive scene, marking their return to Counter-Strike esports for the first time since October 2020. The organization also announced the online casino Roobet as the team's title sponsor and the team will play under the name "100 Thieves Roobet". On November 12, the team made their first signings with the hirings of Graham "messioso" Pitt as Head of CS Operations and Sean "sgares" Gares as Head of FPS. The latter had previously been head coach for their Valorant team and will be working with both the Counter-Strike 2 and Valorant divisions. On November 13, 100 Thieves announced their first player in multi-time HLTV MVP Håvard "rain" Nygaard. On December 19, 100 Thieves announced Lukas "gla1ve" Rossander as their head coach. On January 5, 2026, 100 Thieves announced the signings of André "Ag1l" Gil, Alex "poiii" Sundgren, and William "sirah" Kjærsgaard. The following day, the team was finalized with the signing Nicolai "dev1ce" Reedtz.

==== Current roster ====
100 Thieves Counter-Strike 2 roster
Players
Coaches

Handle	Name	Nationality
rain	Nygaard, Håvard	Norway
poiii	Sundgren, Alex	Sweden
sirah	Kjærsgaard, William	Denmark
dev1ce	Reedtz, Nicolai	Denmark
Gizmy	von Spreckelsen, Jack	United Kingdom

Head coach

Lukas "gla1ve" Rossander

Assistant coach(es)

Jaime "Séns" Callejas
Lucas "zander" Carvalho

Legend:
- (I) Inactive
- (S) Suspended
- Substitute
- (injured) Injury / Illness

Latest roster transaction: July 16, 2026.

=== Marvel Rivals ===
In March 2025, 100 Thieves announced their entry into the Marvel Rivals competitive scene with the roster of Huu "Billion" Ngo, Anthony "delenna" Rosa, Harvey "hxrvey" Scattergood, James "SJP" Hudson, Marschal "Terra" Weaver, Eric "TTK" Arraiga, and Vincent "Vinnie" Scaratine with Joshua "Tensa" Small as head coach. In May 2025, 100 Thieves parted ways with Tensa as their head coach. In June 2025, Luis "iRemiix" Figueroa and Kamryn "Malenia" Mistry were hired as the team's new coaches with Malenia also being a substitute, while Billion would leave the team. In August 2025, SJP was released. A month later, Jacob "Nuk" Allen was signed to the roster.

On November 17, 100 Thieves announced that they would be leaving the Marvel Rivals competitive scene, releasing their entire roster.

On February 10, 2026, 100 Thieves announced that they have re-joined the Marvel Rivals scene as part of the Marvel Rivals Partner Program, re-signing Delenna, Malenia, TTK, Vinnie with IRemiix as the head coach to join the new additions of Bryce “Self” Pettit and Pol “Wyni” Carracedo. In August 2026, deleena and Vinnie were both released and Cart and Jimmy "nectar" Lebel-Frenette joined the roster with Oasis as a substitute.

==== Current roster ====
100 Thieves Marvel Rivals roster
Players
Coaches

Role	Handle	Name	Nationality
Duelist	nectar	Lebel-Frenette, Jimmy	United States
Duelist	Self	Pettit, Bryce	United States
Strategist	Malenia	Mistry, Kamryn	United States
Strategist	Wyni	Carracedo, Pol	Spain
Vanguard	cart	TBA	United States
Vanguard	TTK	Arragia, Eric	United States
Strategist	Oasis	TBA	Sweden

Head coach

Luis "iRemiix" Figueroa

Legend:
- (I) Inactive
- (S) Suspended
- Substitute
- (injured) Injury / Illness

Latest roster transaction: August 28, 2026.

=== Rainbow Six Siege ===
On February 14, 2026, 100 Thieves announced their entry into the Rainbow Six Siege competitive scene as part of the R6 Partner Program. On March 9, 100 Thieves announced their inaugural roster of Adam "Atom" Gutierrez, Arthur "GMZ" Oliveria, Roberto "Panbazou" Feliciano, Zachary "SpiriTz" Dionne, and Evan "Yoggah" Nelson with the coaching staff of Luiz "Kizi" Sirico and Kaique "Kpan" Pantojo. After going 0-4 in the group stage of the 2026 North American League Kickoff tournament, 100 Thieves announced the release of players Panbazou and Yoggah, and the firing of head coach Kizi on May 22, and signed new players Matthew "Hotancold" Stevens and Kason with Igor "Vivas" Vivas as their new head coach.

==== Current roster ====
100 Thieves Rainbow Six Siege roster
Players
Coaches

Handle	Name	Nationality
Atom	Gutierrez, Adam	United States
Hotancold	Stevens, Matthew	United States
GMZ	Oliveria, Arthur	Brazil
Kason	Kason	United States
SpiriTz	Dionne, Zachary	Canada

Head coach

Igor "Vivas" Vivas

Assistant coach(es)

Kaique "Kpan" Pantojo

Legend:
- (I) Inactive
- (S) Suspended
- Substitute
- (injured) Injury / Illness

Latest roster transaction: May 22, 2026.

=== Valorant ===
==== 2020: First Strike Champions ====
On June 4, 2020, 100 Thieves Esports announced their entrance into the Valorant competitive scene through the signing of Spencer "Hiko" Martin. Within three weeks of signing Hiko, the team was finalized. The team also signed Hector "FrosT" Rosario as their head coach but he was announced until months later. The original team consisted of in-game leader Keane "Valliate" Alonso, Diondre "YaBoiDre" Bond, Zachary "Venerated" Roach, and Alfred "Pride" Choi. This team, however, did not last long; on August 14, 2020, the entire team, apart from Hiko, was released. Shortly thereafter, the team went on to sign Counter-Strike: Global Offensive veterans Nick "nitr0" Cannella and in-game leader Joshua "steel" Nissan. 2 months later, the team was once again finalized after signing Peter "Asuna" Mazuryk and Quan "dicey" Tran from Immortals. The team went on to win the very first Valorant First Strike tournament, defeating TSM in the grand finals.

==== 2021–2022: Roster changes ====
On January 26, 2021, the team brought in Jonathan "silenx" Huntington as a substitute in place of nitr0, due to nitr0's wife going into labor. Nitr0 returned to the team shortly after. On February 28, 2021, the team benched dicey in favor of another veteran CS:GO player, Ethan "Ethan" Arnold. After the Masters 3 tourney, the team decided to call up their substitute Aaron "b0i" Thao to the starting roster, moved steel to the bench, and appointed nitr0 as full-time in-game leader. The team also added Johann "seven" Hernandez as a substitute. Their 2021 season ended after falling to Cloud9 in the NA Last Chance Qualifier for Valorant Champions. On November 12, the team fired FrosT. On November 23, dicey and b0i were dropped from the team. Soon after, both steel and nitr0 departed the team.

They started 2022 with the signing of in-game leader Adam "ec1s" Eccles and Hunter "BabyJ" Schline and promoting analyst Jovanni "Jovi" Vera to head coach. Shockingly, after two losses in the 2022 NA VCT Challengers Stage 1 group stage, ec1s and BabyJ were released; the team then acquired Sean "bang" Bezerra from TSM and Noah "jcStani" Smith from Kansas City Pioneers on loans and Ethan was appointed as in-game leader. After being eliminated in the 2022 NA VCT Challengers group stage, the team parted ways with Jovi and hired Sean "sgares" Gares as head coach with Michael "Mikes" Hockom joining him as an assistant, and hiring Daniel "ddk" Kapadia as general manager. On March 27, jcStani announced his free agency after his loan period ended with the team. On April 12, Hiko announced his retirement from competitive Valorant but remained with the organization as a content creator. A couple days later, bang was fully bought out and the team then signed Derrek "Derrek" Ha, in-game leader Brenden "stellar" McGrath, and William "Will" Cheng, while Ethan was moved to the bench and later released. The team was able to qualify for 2022 Valorant Champions after beating The Guard in the grand finals of the NA Last Chance Qualifier. The team was then placed Group D alongside DRX, FURIA Esports, and Fnatic. The team finished the tournament 9-12th. Following the end of the regular 2022 season, 100 Thieves released Will and signed XSET star player Matthew "Cryo" Panganiban, and Mikes was promoted to head coach, following Sgares's departure. 100 Thieves ended the year by winning the Red Bull Home Ground tournament #3 in Manchester with a 3–0 win over Cloud9 in December 2022.

==== 2022–present: VCT Americas era ====
===== 2022–2023 season =====
In September 2022, 100 Thieves was selected as one of the thirty teams to be part of Riot Games' partnership program for the 2023 season. During the season, they failed to qualify to Americas League playoffs and were also eliminated in their first match in the Americas Last Chance Qualifier. On September 12, 2023, 100 Thieves announced the release of Derrek and stellar.

===== 2023–2024 season =====
On September 25, 2023, 100 Thieves signed Tony "Zikz" Gray as head coach, who had previously been head coach for their League of Legends team. Mikes was moved back to assistant coach. On November 1, 2023, 100 Thieves announced Daniel "eeiu" Vucenovic to the starting roster. 100 Thieves competed in the main event of Red Bull Home Ground #4 in Tokyo with Nicholas "NaturE" Garrison as a stand-in and interim in-game leader, and placed fifth.

On January 8, 2024, 100 Thieves rounded out their roster with in-game leader, Kelden "Boostio" Pupello. Boostio, along with Zikz, previously won the 2023 Valorant Champions with Evil Geniuses. The season started off poorly with 100 Thieves losing all their games in the Kickoff tournament and being eliminated. In Americas Stage 1, they placed second in their group and qualified for the playoffs. With a clean sweep of their playoff games including a 3–0 win over G2 Esports in the grand final, they became Stage 1 champions and qualified to Masters Shanghai as the first seed from Americas, earning a bye to the playoffs and 9 circuit points for the 2024 Valorant Champions. At Shanghai, they placed 4th after beating FUT and Paper Rex but losing to both eventual finalists Gen.G and Team Heretics. With a 2–3 record in Americas Stage 2, the team made it into playoffs but placed 4th, ending their year one win away from qualifying to Champions.

===== 2024–2025 season =====
On October 3, it was announced that Bang would be leaving after two and a half years with the team. On October 8, Alexander "Zander" Dituri was announced as the new fifth member of the roster with Yury "frenya" Elkin and Rudi "rudi" Mcken joining the coaching staff later on.

After a subpar start to the year, being eliminated immediately from 2025 Kickoff, and not making it to Masters Toronto either, 100 Thieves placed second in the 2025 Esports World Cup qualifier and became one of four Americas teams to qualify for Riyadh. They lost both matches played at EWC and were eliminated in last place. On July 19, Boostio was benched and Drew "Kess" Lee was added to the roster, while Zander would take over in-game leading duties. In Stage 2, 100 Thieves finished with a 3–2 record in group stage, but were eliminated by Cloud9 in the Stage 2 playoffs and failed to qualify for Champions.

===== 2025–2026 season =====
After being eliminated, 100 Thieves allowed all members of the roster and coaching staff to explore their options of the 2026 season as restricted free agents. During the offseason, majority of the roster and all of the coaching staff left, while Asuna and Cryo stayed. On November 6, the team announced the signings of TSM trio Timothée "Timotino" Dupont, in-game leader Jordan "vora" Pulwer, and 2021 Valorant Champion Laurynas "Nbs" Kisielius as their new head coach with Erik "d00mbr0s" Sandgren as an assistant. The following day, the team finalized their roster for the 2026 season by re-signing Bang, who departed the team the offseason prior. On November 12, the team announced that Sgares would be returning to the team as the Head of FPS, primarily working with the Valorant and Counter-Strike 2 divisions.

Despite failing to qualify for Masters Santiago and Masters London, 100 Thieves won their first international title by defeating NRG 3–1 in the grand finals of the 2026 Esports World Cup, marking the organization's first international tournament victory in Valorant. 100 Thieves later defeated LOUD 3-2 to become Stage 2 Champions and qualified for 2026 Valorant Champions, their first time competing in the tournament in four years. 100 Thieves placed 3rd after being eliminated by Team Vitality.

==== Game Changers ====
On August 4, 2025, 100 Thieves entered the Valorant Game Changers scene by signing the free agent "Aussie and Friends" team that included 100 Thieves content creator Lydia "lidyuh" Wilson, Presley "Slandy" Anderson, Jasmine "Jazzyk1ns" Manankil, Jina "marceline" Kim and Emily "melya" Khan with the coaching staff of Abdo "c4Lypso" Agha as head coach and Anthony "thattree" Duran as an assistant. On August 19, C4Lypso stepped down as head coach. On September 25, Harry "zelo" Davies was hired as the team's new head coach. On November 12, Jazzyk1ns was released.

On February 4, 2026, 100 Thieves released their entire roster (barring Lidyuh) and coaching staff, signing Misu, scaryshark32, terror, and zoriental with Tanishq "Tanizhq" Sabharwal as head coach. In April 2026, 100 Thieves released their entire roster and left the Valorant Game Changer scene.

==== Challengers ====
On June 1, 2026, 100 Thieves announced a collaboration with Your Favorite Player (YFP) to form a new Valorant team to compete in the Valorant Challengers scene branded as "Your Favorite Thieves" or "YFT". They inherited YFP's team that included David “atlas” Griffiths, Jaiden “devy” Mantz, Bradley “Muddy” Saephan, Ali “stallion” Kadhim, and Damion “XXiF” Cook.- The quietly disbanded in July 2026.

==== Current roster ====
100 Thieves Valorant roster
Players
Coaches

Handle	Name	Nationality
Asuna	Mazuryk, Peter	United States
bang	Bezerra, Sean	United States
Cryo	Panganiban, Matthew	United States
Timotino	Dupont, Timothée	Canada
Vora	Pulwer, Jordan	Canada

Head coach

Laurynas "Nbs" Kisielius

Assistant coach(es)

Erik "d00mbr0s" Sandgren

Legend:
- (I) Inactive
- (S) Suspended
- Substitute
- (injured) Injury / Illness

Latest roster transaction: November 7, 2025.

=== Content creators ===
==== Current members ====
ID	Name	Joined
(United States) Nadeshot	Matthew Haag	November 20, 2017
(United States) NoahJ456	Noah Johnson	June 25, 2018
(United States) Valkyrae	Rachell Hofstetter	October 22, 2018
(United States) CouRageJD	Jack Dunlop	May 28, 2019
(United States) Yassuo	Mohammad Abdalrhman	August 22, 2019
(United States) BrookeAB	Brooke Ashley Bond	October 30, 2019
(United States) Jesser	Jesse Riedel	November 17, 2020
(United States) Jiedel	James Riedel	November 17, 2020
(United States) ZackTTG	Zack Mowley	November 17, 2020
(United States) Enable	Ian Wyatt	December 10, 2020
(United States) Fuslie	Leslie Fu	May 12, 2021
(United States) JHBTeam	James Bennett	August 6, 2021 (Note: JHBTeam originally joined as a social media intern on April 13, 2020 before transitioning into a content creator on August 6, 2021.)
(United States) NiceWigg	Jack Martin	September 12, 2021
(United States) Hiko	Spencer Martin	April 12, 2022 (Note: Hiko originally joined as a Valorant player on June 4, 2020, before transitioning into a content creator on April 12, 2022.)
(United States) Vinnie Hacker	Vinnie Hacker	May 11, 2022
(United States) PeterParkTV	Peter Park	August 3, 2022
(United States) Lough	Logan Robles	November 21, 2022
(United States) Octane	Sam Larew	June 27, 2023 (Note: Octane originally joined as a Call of Duty player on September 9, 2021, before transitioning into a content creator on June 27, 2023.)
(United States) JoshChx	Josh Chx	March 7, 2024
(United States) KingWoolz	Carter Woolley	March 7, 2024
(United States) LEGIQN	Jordan Payton	March 7, 2024
(United States) Lidyuh	Lydia Wilson	March 7, 2024
(United States) Sparkles_QT	Adriana	March 7, 2024
(Australia) Ylona Garcia	Ylona Garcia	August 2024
(Canada) Sunny		July 8, 2025
(China) Pipluptiny	Anita	July 10, 2025
(United States) PsyPho	Sammy	June 12, 2026
(United States) Kalei	Kalei Renay	July 23, 2026
(United States) Danny	Danny Bans	August 26, 2026
(United States) Nick	Nick Grajeda	August 26, 2026
(United States) Romeo	Romeo Centeno	August 26, 2026
(Philippines) Sophy	Sophia Mapua	October 5, 2026

==== Former members ====
ID	Name	Joined	Left
(United States) Nickmercs	Nick Kolcheff	January 2018	May 24, 2019
(United States) Mako	Joseph Kelsey	June 14, 2019	December 15, 2020
(United States) Avalanche	Brandon Thomas	June 14, 2019	January 31, 2021
(United States) Classify	Yan Shalomov	June 14, 2019	January 31, 2021
(United States) Froste	Erind Puka	June 14, 2019	January 31, 2021
(South Korea) TinaKitten	Christina Kenyon	September 15, 2021	December 26, 2022
(United States) AustinShow	Austin	March 11, 2021	March 6, 2023
(United States) CashNasty	Cassius Clay	November 17, 2020	March 21, 2023
(England) Kristopher London	Kristopher Obaseki	November 17, 2020	March 21, 2023
(United States) Moochie	Mitchell Crowley	November 17, 2020	March 21, 2023
(United States) Neekolul	Nicole Sanchez	July 10, 2020	June 23, 2023
(Canada) Kyedae	Kyedae Shymko	April 16, 2021	January 23, 2024
(United States) Will Neff	William Neff	November 2, 2021	February 5, 2024
(South Korea) Ssumday	Kim Chan-ho	February 27, 2024	May 7, 2024
(United States) IiTzTimmy	Timothy An	November 9, 2022	March 3, 2025
(United States) D4vd	David Burke	March 7, 2024	September 2025
(England) Ellum	Josh Bingle	March 20, 2025	December 2025

== Former divisions ==
=== Call of Duty: Warzone ===
In November 2020, 100 Thieves entered the Call of Duty: Warzone competitive scene announcing Thomas "Tommey" Trewren and Rhys "Rated Price" as their first players. In October 2022, Tommey left the team, with Rated also leaving a month later.

In April 2025, 100 Thieves returned to the scene for the 2025 Esports World Cup, announcing the roster of Rasim "Blazt" Ogresevic, Gabe "GabeKunn" Kunn, Logan "Skullface" Greifelt, and Ethan "Ebatez" Bates as head coach. In October 2025, t100 Thieves exited the scene, releasing their entire roster.

=== Clash Royale ===
In April 2018, 100 Thieves was announced as member of the Clash Royale League. In the following months, 100 Thieves announced the roster of Eduadro "Eddie" Rojas-Torras, Jacob "Frost" Horsch, James "Pt105" Keresey, and Hoan "PureZuhn" Le, with Davis "Gilgamesh" Huang as head coach and William "Woody" Hix as the team's general manager.

In December 2018, 100 Thieves announced their departure from competitive Clash Royale.

=== Counter-Strike: Global Offensive ===
In December 2017, 100 Thieves announced that they signed the former roster of Immortals which included players Bruno "BIT" Lima, Lincoln "fnx" Lau, Henrique "HEN1" Teles, Vito "kNgV-" Giuseppe, and Lucas "LUCAS1" Teles with Rodolfo "bLecker" Blecker as head coach. However, the organization had issues with visas, resulting in the team being disbanded.

In late October 2019, 100 Thieves announced the signing of the former Renegades roster which included Aaron "AZR" Ward, Sean "Gratisfaction" Kaiwai, Joakim "jkaem" Myrbostad, Justin "jks" Savage, and Jay "Liazz" Tregillgas with Aleksandar "kassad" Trifunović as head coach. At IEM Beijing 2019, the team placed second in the tournament, losing to Astralis. The team placed 7th–8th at the ESL Season 10 Pro League Finals, losing to Fnatic. In April 2020, head coach Kassad was mutually let go from the team and Chet "Chet" Singh was hired as the new head coach a month later. On October 12, 2020, 100 Thieves announced their departure from the competitive CS:GO scene, citing complications with travel, a focus on European events, and COVID-19 as the main reasons behind the move.

=== Fortnite: Battle Royale ===
In July 2018, 100 Thieves announced their entrance into the Fortnite: Battle Royale competitive scene, announcing the signings of Kenith, Archie "Parallax" Sharder, and Alex "Risker" Biamonte, with SirDimetrious joining a month later.

At the beginning of 2019, Risker and Parallax were released and the team signed Maurilio "Blind" Gramajo, Davis "Ceice" McClellan, Hayden "Elevate" Krueger, Brandon "Klass" Weaver, and Gabriel "Kyuzi" Harlos. At the end of 2019, Blind, Kenith, and SirDimetrious were released, with the team signing Diego "Arkhram" Lima, Brendan "Falconer" Facloner, and Brett "grandmateets" Squires. At the Fortnite World Cup, Ceice and Elevate placed 3rd in the duos competition, while Arkhram and Falconer placed 5th.

In 2020, the team signed Martin "MrSavage" Andersen and Brodie "rehx" Franks, with Grandmateets, Klass, and Kyzui leaving the team.

In February 2021, Ceice and Elevate left the team. The next year, 100 Thieves exited the Fortnite: Battle Royale competitive scene, releasing the remaining roster members.

=== League of Legends ===
==== 2018: Inaugural season ====
On November 20, 2017, 100 Thieves was accepted as a franchise organization for the 2018 NA LCS season. The team signed Neil "pr0lly" Hammad as its head coach and Kim "Ssumday" Chan-ho, William "Meteos" Hartman, Ryu "Ryu" Sang-wook, Cody Sun, and Zaqueri "Aphromoo" Black for its starting roster. The team placed first in the spring split regular season with a 12–6 record, securing a bye into the semifinals. Additionally, Aphromoo was voted as MVP of the spring split. The first team they faced in the playoffs was Clutch Gaming, and 100 Thieves won 3–2, moving on to the finals, where they were swept 0–3 by Team Liquid in the finals.

100 Thieves' second-place finish qualified them for Rift Rivals 2018, an international tournament between the top three spring teams from Europe and North America. The team elected to use substitute player Đỗ "Levi" Duy Khánh in place of Meteos for the tournament. Team Liquid, 100 Thieves, and Echo Fox competed against Europe's Fnatic, G2 Esports, and Splyce, going a combined 4–5 in the double round-robin group stage with 100 Thieves with a 1–2 record after a single win against Splyce. In the best-of-five "relay race" finals, the team lost their game against Fnatic, contributing to North America's combined 1–3 loss to Europe.

Before the summer split, 100 Thieves traded Meteos to Flyquest, in exchange for their jungler, Andy "AnDa" Hoang. Following this roster move, the team placed third in the regular season with a 10–8 record. The team won their first match 3–0 over FlyQuest, before losing 1–3 to Team Liquid in the semi-finals, then losing 2–3 in the third place match to Team SoloMid.

The team's performance across both splits allowed them to qualify for the 2018 League of Legends World Championship in South Korea as North America's second seed. The team was drawn to Group D with Europe's Fnatic, China's Invictus Gaming, and Hong Kong's G-Rex. Shortly after qualifying for the world championship, they replaced Cody Sun with substitute player Richard "Rikara" Oh. 100 Thieves finished third in their group with a 2–4 record, and 12th overall, not qualifying for the knockout stage.

==== 2019–2020: Roster changes ====
In 2019, the team extended top laner Ssumday's contract, while Ryu moved to an assistant position. Cody Sun and Rikara opted to leave the team, and they were replaced by Choi "huhi" Jae-hyun and Bae "Bang" Jan-sik. Partway through the spring split, Huhi was benched in favor for Max "Soligo" Soong, but despite attempts at change, the team finished the spring split in dead last, with a 4–14 record, and elected to make additional roster changes for summer. Huhi left the team, and Maurice "Amazing" Stückenschneider joined to replace AnDa, who was moved to the academy roster along with Ryu. A month into the split, the team replaced Soligo with Ryu from the academy roster, and also swapped Ssumday with Aaron "FakeGod" Lee, as LCS rules required at least 3 North American residents on the starting roster. The team finished the summer split in eighth place and did not qualify for the post–season.

100 Thieves began the 2020 season with the announcement that Chris "PapaSmithy" Smith would be joining the team as the new general manager. Tony "Zikz" Gray was the next addition to the roster, replacing pr0lly as head coach, and both Meteos and Cody Sun rejoined the team for the second time, alongside new additions William "Stunt" Chen and Tommy "Ryoma" Le. Ryu, Amazing, Bang and Aphromoo all left the team, with FakeGod rejoining Academy and Ssumday rejoining the main roster. In spring, the team finished third in the regular season with a 10–8 record, and qualified for post–season for the first time since 2018. However once in the playoffs, they were swept 0–3 by Cloud9, and then lost 2–3 to Team SoloMid in the losers' bracket. After an 1–5 start in the summer split, the team parted ways with players Meteos and Stunt, and called up academy players Juan "Contractz" Garcia and Philippe "Poome" Lavoie-Giguere to replace them. The team finished in seventh at the end of the summer split with a 7–11 record, and were seeded into the loser's bracket of the playoffs, where they would be swept 0–3 by Evil Geniuses to finish their 2020 season.

==== 2021: LCS Champions ====
The 2021 season started with the team signing Can "Closer" Çelik, Victor "FBI" Huang, Tanner "Damonte" Damonte, and a returning Huhi from Golden Guardians. Ry0ma (renamed from Ryoma) and Poome were moved to the academy roster, while Cody Sun and Contractz both left the team. The team also added Aleš "Freeze" Kněžínek and Ham "Lustboy" Jang-sik to the coaching staff. The season started off with the preseason Lock−In tournament, and the team starting strong, placing first in their group, before sweeping Immortals 2–0 in the first round of the knock−out stage. In the semifinals they faced Cloud9, and despite winning the first two games, were reverse swept to lose 2–3 in the series, and finish 3rd/4th in the tournament. In week 5 of the spring split, the team decided to bring back Ry0ma as their starter and sent Damonte to academy. They finished the spring split in third place, and in the Mid-Season Showdown, were swept 0–3 by Cloud9, before picking up a 3–0 win of their own against Dignitas in the losers bracket. The team faced Team SoloMid next, and fell 1–3, and were eliminated from playoffs.

After a fourth-place finish in the spring split, the team parted ways with head coach Zikz and hired Bok "Reapered" Han-gyu as his replacement. Prior to the start of the summer split, 100 Thieves signed Felix "Abbedagge" Braun from the LEC, and Ry0ma was subsequently sent back to academy, while Damonte was dropped by the organization. The revamped roster would go on to finish second in the regular season, with a record of 29–16. The team won their first playoff match 3–2 against Evil Geniuses, before falling 2–3 to Team Liquid. In the losers' bracket, 100 Thieves defeated Cloud9 3–1 to set up a finals rematch against Team Liquid. This time around, 100 Thieves defeated Team Liquid in a 3–0 sweep, to win the 2021 LCS Championship and qualify for the 2021 League of Legends World Championship. The team's performance secured them a bye into Group B alongside China's Edward Gaming, Korea's T1, and Japan's DetonatioN FocusMe. The team finished third in their group, with a 3–3 record, and were eliminated from the tournament, placing 9th–12th overall and ending their season.

==== 2022–2023: Playoff struggles ====
In 2022, the team announced all five players would be returning, with academy top laner Milan "Tenacity" Oleksij as a sixth man. Alfonso "Mithy" Rodriguez also joined the coaching staff in the off−season. Once again, 100 Thieves were atop their group in the Lock−In tournament, however they were upset 0–2 by Dignitas in the quarterfinals of the Knock−Out stage, and eliminated early. Through the first round robin of the spring split, 100 Thieves accumulated a 5–4 record, putting them in a three-way tie for third place. 100 Thieves ultimately ended the spring split with a record of 12–6, securing themselves third place. In the first round of Playoffs, they swept Cloud 9 3–0 to advance to the winner bracket finals, where they came back from a 0–2 deficit to reverse sweep Team Liquid and advance to Grand Finals. There, they lost 0–3 to Evil Geniuses, denying 100 Thieves back to back championships.

Following a group stage exit at the 2022 World Championship, General manager PapaSmithy and coaches Repeared, Mithy, and Freeze parted ways with the team.

For the 2023 season, 100 Thieves released the entire roster except Closer, signing veterans Yiliang "Doublelift" Peng and Søren "Bjergsen" Bjerg and promoting Alan "Busio" Cwalina from the academy, and Tenacity to full-time top laner. The team also hired Christopher "Kaas" Oudheusden as their new head coach with Erlend "Nukeduck" Holm joining as an assistant and promoting Joseph "JungleJuice" Jang as general manager. After a 5–8 start to the Spring Split, Kaas and 100 Thieves parted ways and Nukeduck was promoted to interim head coach with Danny "Dan Dan" Comte joining as an assistant from the challengers team. Following a quick exit in Spring playoffs, Bjergsen announced his retirement.

After Bjergsen's retirement, the team announced their new head coach in Jang "Cain" Nu-ri and the signing of Lim "Quid" Hyeon-seung as their new mid laner. The team also brought back Ssumday as Tenacity decided to move to content creation. The team finished with a 7–11 record and placed 7th-8th in the summer split championship.

==== 2024–2025: Final seasons ====
For the 2024 season, the team parted ways with the whole roster and coaching staff except for Quid, signing Rayan "Sniper" Shoura, Kim "River" Dong-woo, Brandon "Meech" Choi, and Bill "Eyla" Nguyen. The team also announced Greyson "Goldenglue" Gilmer as their new head coach. The team finished 5th-8th in the Spring playoffs with a 10–4 record in the regular season.

During the Summer split, Meech was benched and the team signed Frank "Tomo" Lam. The team finished the regular season with a 3–4 record and finished 3rd in the Summer playoffs and qualified for the 2024 World Championship play-in, where they would be eliminated by PSG Talon. In October 2024, Meech was released.

On October 31, 100 Thieves announced their intention to sell their LCS franchise spot for the 2025 season, however, after close collaboration with Riot Games, 100 Thieves would continue to take part in the LCS (now reformed as the League of Legends Championship of The Americas (LTA) as the LCS merged with CBLOL and LLA) as a "provisional guest partner" in 2025. In November 2024, Tomo was released and FBI was re-signed as the new starting bot laner. They finished the regular season of Split 1 in first place, but finished as runner-ups in the playoffs, losing to Team Liquid 0–3 in the grand finals In Split 2, they finished 3rd in the regular season standings and placed top 6 in the playoffs. In July 2025, 100 Thieves announced that they would be exiting the LTA and League of Legends competitive scene after the 2025 season. In August 2025, Nishp "Dhokla" Doshi was added to the roster as a sixth man.

In October 2025, T1 defeated 100 Thieves at the 2025 Worlds tournament, resulting in their withdrawal from League of Legends.

=== Street Fighter ===
In May 2025, 100 Thieves announced their entry into the Street Fighter competitive scene with signing of Sean "Shine" Simpson. After placing 25th-36th in the 2025 Esports World Cup, Shine was quietly released and 100 Thieves exited the Street Fighter competitive scene.

=== Teamfight Tactics ===
In May 2025, 100 Thieves announced their entry into the Teamfight Tactics competitive scene with the roster of Joseph "Dishsoap" Goldsmith, Yoo "Kiyoon" Ki-yoon, Rereplay, and Spencer "Spencer" Zhou. In December 2025, the roster was released and 100 Thieves exited the scene.

== 100 Thieves Compound ==
The 100 Thieves Compound is a 15,000 square foot esports, entertainment, and apparel hub, located in Culver City, California. It has four sports training rooms: the Rocket Mortgage League of Legends training room, the AT&T Valorant training room, the Totino's Fortnite training room, and the League of Legends Academy training room. It also has a content studio, which is worth around half a million dollars. Other areas include the Cash App Lounge, the Totino's basketball court, many business operation areas and four streaming pods. Chairs, catering, and PCs are provided by Secretlab, Chipotle and NZXT respectively. It was formerly known as the 100 Thieves Cash App Compound.

The compound served as an LA County vote center for the 2020 United States presidential election.

== Awards and nominations ==
Year	Ceremony	Category	Result	Ref.
2021	Esports Awards	Esports Apparel of the Year	Won	
2021	Esports Awards	Esports Organization of the Year	Won	
2021	The Streamer Awards	Best Content Organization	Nominated	
2022	Esports Awards	Content Group of the Year	Nominated	
2022	Esports Awards	Esports Apparel of the Year	Won	
2022	Esports Awards	Esports Creative Team of the Year	Nominated	
2022	The Streamer Awards	Best Content Organization	Nominated	
