= Cody Sun =

Canadian League of Legends player

Personal information
- Born: April 25, 1997 (age 29)
- Nationality: Canadian

Career information
- Game: League of Legends
- Role: Bot

Team history
- 2015: Magnetic
- 2015: Team Imagine
- 2015–2016: Team Frostbite
- 2016: Dream Team
- 2016–2017: Immortals
- 2017: Team Liquid
- 2017–2018: 100 Thieves
- 2018–2019: Clutch Gaming
- 2019: Dignitas
- 2019–2020: 100 Thieves
- 2020–2021: TSM Academy
- 2021–2022: Mirage Elyandra

Chinese name
- Simplified Chinese: 孙立宇
- Traditional Chinese: 孫立宇
Transcriptions
Standard Mandarin
- Hanyu Pinyin: Sūn Lìyǔ

Liyu "Cody" Sun (Chinese: 孙立宇; born April 25, 1997) is a Canadian professional League of Legends player. He first rose to prominence while playing for Immortals in 2017, qualifying for the World Championship in his debut year in the LCS. The next year he qualified with 100 Thieves, and again the year after with Clutch Gaming.

== Career ==
Cody Sun began his League of Legends career in the Challenger scene, playing for several semi-professional teams from mid-2015 to late 2016. These teams included Magnetic, Team Imagine, Team Frostbite and Dream Team.

=== Immortals (2017) ===
On December 9, 2016, he joined Immortals and in the following year debuted in the LCS as the team's bot laner. Following a seventh-place finish in the spring split, Immortals finished second in the summer regular season and advanced all the way to the summer finals, where they were defeated by TSM. Nonetheless, Immortals qualified for the 2017 World Championship by having the most championship points at the end of the summer split.

At the 2017 World Championship, Immortals were placed in Group B of the main event group stage, along with Europe's Fnatic, South Korea's Longzhu Gaming and Vietnam's GIGABYTE Marines. A crucial misplay by Cody Sun in a game versus Fnatic led to his team's loss and the start of Fnatic's comeback in the group stage, as in the following match Fnatic defeated the GIGABYTE Marines to force a three-way tie in Group B. In one of the two subsequent tiebreaker matches, Fnatic defeated Immortals and knocked them out of the tournament. After failing to secure a spot in the newly franchised LCS, Immortals disbanded on November 20, 2017, and Cody Sun's contract was briefly held by Team Liquid before he joined 100 Thieves for the 2018 spring split.

=== 100 Thieves (2018) ===
100 Thieves finished the 2018 spring regular season in first place after five straight wins and a tiebreaker victory over Echo Fox, giving them a bye into the semifinals, where they defeated Clutch Gaming in a close series. However, 100 Thieves went on to be swept by Team Liquid in the finals.

100 Thieves finished third in the summer regular season and won their quarterfinal series against FlyQuest playing exclusively with Cody Sun as their bot laner, but in the semifinals he was suddenly swapped out for Rikara, despite Rikara having never played in the LCS. 100 Thieves ended up losing to Team Liquid in the semifinals and TSM in the third-place decider match. Nonetheless, Cody Sun's team once again qualified for the World Championship by having the most championship points; however he did not play a single game at the World Championship, as 100 Thieves opted to use only Rikara.

=== Clutch Gaming (2019) ===
Prior to the start of the 2019 summer split, Clutch Gaming announced that it was signing Cody Sun, replacing Piglet as the team's starting bot laner. Cody Sun's prowess in the bot lane was integral to Clutch Gaming's improved performance, which secured them a fifth-place finish in the regular season and a spot in playoffs. In the quarterfinals Clutch Gaming defeated TSM, but lost to Team Liquid in a close semifinal series. Clutch Gaming was then reverse swept by CLG in the third-place decider match, forcing them to begin in the first round of the regional qualifier for the 2019 World Championship. After defeating FlyQuest, CLG and TSM in the first, second and third rounds respectively, Clutch Gaming secured a spot in the 2019 World Championship as the LCS' third seed.

Clutch Gaming began in the play-in stage of the 2019 World Championship, where they were placed in Group A with the CIS' Unicorns of Love and Australia's Mammoth. After losing to the Unicorns of Love and defeating Mammoth in both round robins, Group A was locked in a three-way tie, but Clutch Gaming avoided the first tiebreaker match due to them having the shortest total game time (63:37) among their victories. Clutch Gaming then defeated the Unicorns of Love to secure first seed in their group. In the second round of play-in stage, Clutch Gaming was pitted against Turkey's Royal Youth, who they promptly swept to secure a spot in the main event.

Because of group draw rules for the main event, Clutch Gaming was forced into Group C, which was nicknamed the "group of death" due to it having three regional superteams: South Korea's SK Telecom T1, China's Royal Never Give Up, and Europe's Fnatic. Clutch Gaming finished last in their group and were eliminated without picking up a single win in the double round robin.

=== Return to 100 Thieves (2020) ===
In late 2019 it was announced that Cody Sun had rejoined 100 Thieves for the 2020 spring split.
