= Golden Guardians =

American esports organization

- Short name: GG (formerly GGS)
- Divisions: Apex Legends; League of Legends; Super Smash Bros. Melee; Teamfight Tactics; World of Warcraft
- Founded: November 20, 2017
- Folded: 2023
- League: LCS
- Based in: Oakland, California
- Location: United States
- Parent group: Golden State Warriors
- Website: www.goldenguardians.com

The Golden Guardians (GG) were an American esports organization owned by the Golden State Warriors. The organization was one of four that joined the League of Legends Championship Series (LCS) in 2018 after the league began franchising, the others being 100 Thieves, Clutch Gaming and OpTic Gaming. On December 18, 2019, the Golden Guardians announced their expansion into the professional scenes of Apex Legends, Teamfight Tactics and World of Warcraft. In 2020, Golden Guardians expanded into Super Smash Bros. Melee by signing player Zain "Zain" Naghmi.

In November 2023, Golden Guardians announced their departure from the LCS as the league shifted from a ten-team to an eight-team format. That same month, Melee player and streamer Kevin "PPMD" Nanney, who had signed to Golden Guardians in 2021, announced the disbanding of Golden Guardians as an organization. Nanney cited the organizations departure from the LCS as the main factor. The following month, it was noted that the Golden Guardians X page had been deleted.

== League of Legends ==
=== History ===
==== 2018 season ====
The Golden Guardians finalized their roster for the 2018 NA LCS Spring Split on December 13, 2017, signing top laner Samson "Lourlo" Jackson, jungler Juan "Contractz" Arturo Garcia, mid laner Hai "Hai" Du Lam, bot laner Matthew "Deftly" Chen and support Matthew "Matt" Elento, with Choi "Locodoco" Yoon-seop as head coach for the team. On February 4, 2018, Locodoco was fired after making inappropriate remarks towards a female member of Riot Games' esports staff. The final decision was made by the Golden State Warriors, the parent company of the Golden Guardians, who cited their strict zero tolerance policy. Assistant coach Tyler Perron was subsequently promoted to interim head coach to fill the vacant position. The team finished the regular season of the 2018 NA LCS Spring Split in tenth place with a 4–14 record.

On April 23, 2018, the Golden Guardians acquired mid laner Young-min "Mickey" Son from Team Liquid, in preparation for the 2018 NA LCS Summer Split. Shortly afterwards, Hai announced his retirement from competitive play for the second time and left the team.

The Golden Guardians ended the 2018 NA LCS Summer Split in tenth place, with a 5–13 record, becoming the first team in the league's history to finish last two splits in a row.

==== 2019 season ====
In preparation for the 2019 LCS Spring Split (which had recently renamed to exclude "NA" from its title), the Golden Guardians acquired Kevin "Hauntzer" Yarnell and Kim "Olleh" Joo-sung from Team SoloMid and Team Liquid respectively. Veteran player Henrik "Froggen" Hansen later joined the team to complete the roster. The Golden Guardians also hired Nick "Inero" Smith as the Golden Guardians' new head coach and Danan Flander, former Cloud9 senior general manager, as the team's first general manager.

Despite a disappointing start to the 2019 LCS Spring Split, the Golden Guardians managed to end the regular season in fifth place after losing a tiebreaker match to FlyQuest, with a 9–9 record. This secured the team their first appearance in playoffs, where they narrowly lost 2–3 to FlyQuest in the quarterfinals. During the first half of the summer split the Golden Guardians kept the same starting lineup from the spring split, but later opted to promote bot laner Victor "FBI" Huang and support Choi "Huhi" Jae-hyun from the academy team. Deftly was later traded to Cloud9 Academy for Yuri "Keith" Jew. The Golden Guardians ended the summer split tied for sixth with 100 Thieves and OpTic Gaming. After losing their tiebreaker match to OpTic Gaming, the Golden Guardians were locked out of playoffs.

==== 2023 season ====
For the 2023 LCS Spring Split, the Golden Guardians acquired mid laner Kim "Gori" Tae-woo from Hong Kong team PSG Talon. Huhi returned as the team's support, while top laner Eric "Licorice" Ritchie, jungler Kim "River" Dong-woo, and bot laner Trevor "Stixxay" Hayes were retained from the previous split.

On July 21, 2023, the Golden Guardians defeated 100 Thieves to end the summer split regular season with 13 wins, the most in the organization's history. The team attributed their success to "hard work", "the power of friendship", and "taco Fridays".

=== Tournament results ===
Placement	Event	Final result (W–L)
10th	2018 NA LCS Spring Split	4–14
10th	2018 NA LCS Summer Split	5–13
5th	2019 LCS Spring Split	9–9
5th–6th	2019 LCS Spring Playoffs	2–3 (against FlyQuest)
7th	2019 LCS Summer Split	8–10
6th	2020 LCS Spring Split	8–10
5th–6th	2020 LCS Spring Playoffs	0–3 (against FlyQuest)
5th	2020 LCS Summer Split	9–9
5th–6th	2020 LCS Summer Playoffs	2–3 (against Team SoloMid)
5th–8th	2021 LCS Lock-In	0–2 (against Evil Geniuses)
10th	2021 LCS Spring Split	3–15
8th	2021 LCS Summer Split	14–31
7th–8th	2021 LCS Championship	0–3 (against Cloud9)
5th–8th	2022 LCS Lock-In	0–2 (against Evil Geniuses)
6th	2022 LCS Spring Split	9–9
5th–6th	2022 LCS Spring Playoffs	0–3 (against Cloud9)
8th	2022 LCS Summer Split	5–13
7th–8th	2022 LCS Championship	2–3 (against Counter Logic Gaming)
6th	2023 LCS Spring Split	9–9

== Super Smash Bros. Melee ==
=== History ===
Super Smash Bros. Melee player Zain "Zain" Naghmi was signed by the Golden Guardians on February 6, 2020. During 2020, Zain has won Pound Online, the Ludwig Ahgren Championship Series 2, and Smash Summit 10, all three of which took place online due to the COVID-19 pandemic. On June 20, 2020, Golden Guardians hosted "The Octagon", a one-night showcase of some of Melee's top players competing in a first-to-five wins matchup with the main event being Zain vs Joseph "Mang0" Manuel Marquez, which Zain won 5–2.

On April 2, 2021, the organization announced the signings of Super Smash Bros. Melee player Edgard "n0ne" L. Sheleby, inactive player and streamer Kevin "PPMD" Nanney and commentator Kris "Toph" Aldenderfer.

Zain was ranked the number one player in the world in 2022.

On March 29, 2023, Zain announced his departure from the Golden Guardians; the following day, the organization announced the signings of then-#2-ranked Melee player Masaya "aMSa" Chikamoto and player-commentator Brandon "HomeMadeWaffles" Collier.

In November 2023, Kevin "PPMD" Nanney announced that, though the organization decided to disband, Golden Guardians Melee had been profitable.
