= Echo Fox =

American esports organization (2015–2019)

- Divisions: Apex Legends; Counter-Strike: Global Offensive; Dragon Ball FighterZ; Fortnite Battle Royale; Injustice 2 Madden NFL 19; Mortal Kombat 11; Super Smash Bros. Street Fighter V
- Founded: December 18, 2015
- Folded: November 2019
- Owner: Khalid Jones (co-owner)
- President: Jericho Rosales
- General manager: Justin Lee

Echo Fox was an American esports organization. It was founded on December 18, 2015, by retired basketball player Rick Fox, who created Echo Fox after he purchased the NA LCS spot of Gravity Gaming. The organization had expanded into various games with teams competing in titles such as Gears of War, Call of Duty, CS:GO, Dragon Ball FighterZ, Injustice 2, Madden NFL 19, Mortal Kombat, Super Smash Bros., and Street Fighter V. Echo Fox had several fighting game players with championship titles and are a well known organization in the professional scene.

== History ==
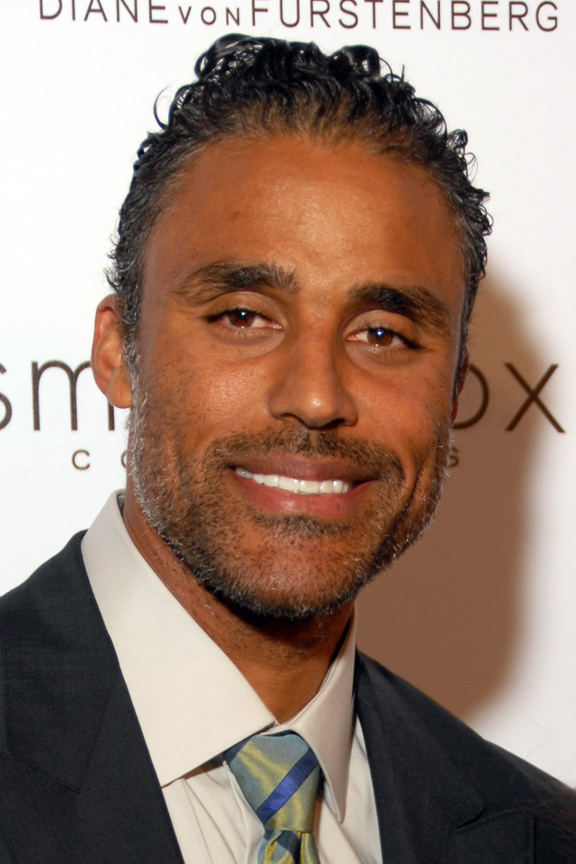
Rick Fox, co-founder of Echo Fox.

On December 18, 2015 Rick Fox and his business partners, Amit Raizada and Khalid Jones, entered the professional esports scene with their acquisition of the NA LCS spot of Gravity Gaming, creating a new team named Echo Fox. According to Raizada, he and Jones "both offered up $1 million each to get the new team off the ground" while Fox "never put in any of his own money into Echo Fox." Fox and Raizada subsequently had a falling out, in which Raizada claims Fox attempted to extort him of $5 million.

In 2019 Kroenke Sports and Entertainment agreed to a deal to purchase the LCS slot from Echo Fox for $30.25 million, however, the deal fell through due to legal issues with their partner, Sentinels.

Riot Games selected Evil Geniuses as the organization that would acquire Echo Fox's League Championship Series slot.

In September 2019, a lawsuit ousting general partner Rick Fox was sent to Fox by several of his business partners, stating Fox had repeatedly worked against the best interests of the company. The letter sent had several signatures including Vision Esports head Stratton Sclavos, investor Daniel Deshe, Raizada Group manager Ravi Srivastava and Khalid Jones, who was Fox's partner in the general partnership. Fox filed a lawsuit against his business partners Amit Raizada and Stratton Sclavos alleging the two partners committed fraud, conspiracy and breach of contract against him.

In November 2019, with numerous rumors spreading about Echo Fox splitting apart over the lawsuits, an Echo Fox investor officially confirmed the organization was disbanded.

== League of Legends ==
On January 23, 2016, due to some concerns over player work-eligibility, Echo Fox was unable to submit a roster and was required to forfeit their match against NRG Esports. Echo Fox finished last in the 2016 Summer NA LCS, forcing a relegation match. They defeated NRG Esports 3–0 in relegations and qualified for the 2017 NA LCS Spring Split.

In 2018, the North American League of Legends Championship Series moved to a franchised league and Echo Fox invested in a spot as a permanent partner. Echo Fox later received an equity investment from the New York Yankees and a new roster, which finished 2nd in the 2018 NA LCS Spring Split with 12 wins and 7 losses after losing a tiebreaker to 100 Thieves.

On August 16, 2019, the rosters of both Echo Fox and Echo Fox Academy were released, and the organization departed the professional League of Legends scene.

== Counter-Strike: Global Offensive ==
While no official reason has been given for Echo Fox allowing its players to leave, it is rumored that this was due to poor performances at both ELEAGUE Season 2 and IBUYPOWER Masters 2016. At ELEAGUE, Echo Fox lost versus Virtus.pro (where they won only a single round on Nuke), and versus G2 Esports (where Echo Fox lost 16–3 and 16–2 on Nuke and Dust 2 respectively). At iBUYPOWER Masters 2016 Echo Fox finished a disappointing 5th–6th place.

== Fighting games ==
Echo Fox entered the fighting game community on April 29, 2016, by signing Street Fighter V player Julio Fuentes. A month later, they would sign Super Smash Bros. pro Jason "Mew2King" Zimmerman.

In 2017, Echo Fox would make one of the biggest signings in esports history by signing seven FGC players all at once, three of which previously represented Evil Geniuses. The players were Street Fighter players Justin Wong, Yusuke Momochi, Hajime "Tokido" Taniguchi, and Yuko "ChocoBlanka" Momochi, Mortal Kombat players Dominique "SonicFox" McLean and Brad "Scar" Vaughn, and Super Smash Bros. player Leonardo "MKLeo" Lopez Perez. At the same time, Echo Fox signed former Evil Geniuses manager Antonio "CoolGrayAJ" Javier as the team's new manager.

Echo Fox would continue growing their team with the signing of Korean and French Tekken pros Saint, JDCR and VorttexX-Shadow, bringing their roster up to thirteen players.

== Call of Duty ==
On May 13, 2016, Echo Fox added a Call of Duty team with a roster of Jeremy "Neslo" Olsen, Jordan "Proof" Cannon, Jonathan "SinfuL" Baez, and Josh "Cyborg" Kimpson. In November, all players except Neslo were dropped and replaced by Anthony "Methodz" Zinni, Teegan "TcM" McCarthy, and Tanner "Mosh" Clark.

== Legacy ==
The legacy of Echo Fox encompasses a duality as being both a transformative entity for esports as well as a cautionary tale.

Echo Fox contributed to normalizing esports competitors in similarity to traditional athletes by investing in esports team infrastructure and establishing new industry standards for team members' housing, nutritional programs, and psychological support.

Echo Fox also had a substantial impact on the fighting game community by signing larger rosters of prominent competitors that spanned multiple game titles and providing salaried compensation and travel support between tournaments. These contributions changed the economic expectations and professional support within the genre and as consequence helped establish an expectation of standards that prompted other competing esport organizations to increase investments in their own teams.

Despite these contributions to esports players and the fighting game community, the rapid fall of Echo Fox is frequently analyzed as a cautionary business case regarding corporate governance in the field of esports. The organization's dissolution highlights financial and structural risks associated with its numerous activities regarding the rapid integration of venture capital, misaligned partnership objectives, as well as internal disputes. The culmination of the forced sale of their League of Legends Championship Series slot, and the dissolution that followed underscored the vulnerability of esports organizations to internal failures regardless of their public brand popularity or competitive success.
