= Rocket League Championship Series =

Video game tournament series

- RLCS Logo from 2020 – 2022 and 2025 – Present
- Nickname: RLCS
- Genre: Rocket League tournament
- Frequency: Twice yearly (2016–2020), Yearly (2020–present)
- Location: Various
- Years active: 2016–present
- Inaugurated: Season 1 (2016)
- Most recent: 2026
- Organizer: Psyonix (2016–2023); Blast ApS (2024–present)
- Sponsors: Progressive Insurance, Blacklyte
- Website: rocketleague.com/competitive
- Rocket League Championship Series 2026–27 Club Championship

The Rocket League Championship Series (RLCS) is an annual Rocket League esports tournament series produced by Blast ApS and endorsed by Psyonix, the game's developer. It consists of two online qualification splits in several regions, with teams earning points towards qualifying for midseason tournaments known as Majors and the Rocket League World Championship, both of which are held as LAN events worldwide.

== History ==
Psyonix had observed the popularity of Rocket League matches on Twitch and other live streaming platforms like YouTube by early 2016 and were looking to use the game more in Esports. In March 2016, Psyonix announced the first Rocket League Championship Series; the finals took place in June 2016 with a US$55,000 prize pool, and was won by iBUYPOWER Cosmic. The second season of the championship series took place in December 2016 with a $125,000 prize pool, and was won by FlipSid3 Tactics. A third series began in March 2017, with the $300,000 prize pool finals taking place three months later. In this season, two teams from the Oceanic region were also invited to compete.

A second division, the Rocket League Rival Series (RLRS), was added in Season 4. The two teams finishing at the bottom of the RLCS and the two teams finishing at the top of the RLRS for each region play each other in a promotion tournament at the end of the season to determine if teams are promoted or relegated. At the advent of Season 5 in June 2018, Psyonix organised and managed the event alone. Previous to this, they partnered with Twitch. Season 6 started in September 2018 and featured a $1,000,000 prize pool. For Season 7, Psyonix introduced South America as a new region. Season 8 took place in December 2019. The Season 9 championship was cancelled due to the COVID-19 pandemic, with winners of the regional championships being considered the champions. In July 2020, Psyonix announced a new format for the tenth season of RLCS, known as RLCS X. This format did away with league play and the RLRS in favor of teams earning points through three regional splits, all culminating in three seasonal majors.

The 2021–22 season began in October 2021, bringing in four new regions (Middle East and North Africa, Asia Pacific North, Asia Pacific South, and Sub-Saharan Africa), a more reliable circuit similar to Season X, and a $6 million prize pool. The new circuit consisted of 3 splits, containing 3 regionals and 1 international LAN major each, culminating in a World Championship to finish the season. The Majors were won by Team BDS, G2 Esports and Moist Esports. The season was won by Team BDS.

For the 2022–23 season Asia Pacific North and Asia Pacific South were combined into a single region with point totals being lowered and each regional event being called the Open, Cup and invitational. The Majors were won by Gen.G, Karmine Corp and Team Vitality, the latter of which would go on to win the World Championship.

Unlike the past two seasons, there was a considerably longer offseason after 2022–23 accompanying the removal of one of the splits, meaning that the 13th season of the RLCS wouldn't begin until January 26, 2024. The 2024 season saw the removal of the Open, Cup and Invitational system for each region in favor of three new open qualifying stages, those being a double-elimination qualifying bracket, a Swiss-system tournament featuring the top 16 from open qualifying and a knockout stage featuring the top 8 from the Swiss stage. This open qualifying cycle is repeated three times per split, awarding RLCS points after each stage, before the top teams in RLCS points in each region from those stages advance to that split's Major, which features the Swiss and knockout stages from open qualifying and award additional points. The combined standings decides who advances to the World Championship, which was reduced from 24 to 16 teams in the process using the same format as the Majors.

On January 4, 2024, it was announced that Blast ApS, a tournament organizer known for the Blast Premier circuit in Counter-Strike as well as organizing the esports circuit for Tom Clancy's Rainbow Six Siege, would take over from Psyonix as organizer for the RLCS in 2024, having previously run the Fortnite Championship Series (previously run by Psyonix's parent company Epic Games) since 2022.

The first major of the RLCS 2024 season was won by Gentlemates Alpine, with the second won by G2 Stride. The season was won by Team BDS. Towards the end of the RLCS 2024 World Championship, it was announced that RLCS would return for the 2025 season in January, with a total prize pool of $5,000,000, the addition of a 1v1 tournament, and changes to the 3v3 tournament which include the addition of last chance open qualifiers between Major 2 and the World Championship, and expanding the World Championship to 20 teams.

The 2025 season uses 2 Swiss groups, 16 teams in each. Top 8 of each group advance to the GSL stage. 2 groups of 8, 4 advance to the hybrid elimination bracket. This format is used for Opens and the World Championship, but Worlds doesn't use the Swiss groups and uses a GSL bracket for the Play-ins. Before the Swiss groups, there is a double elimination bracket and top 32 qualify for the Swiss groups (24 in Open 2, 3, 5 and 6 as top 8 of the last Open automatically qualify for the Swiss groups). Majors use a 16 team Swiss stage, in which top 8 qualify for the hybrid elimination bracket.

The first major of the season was won by Karmine Corp. The major also debuted the RLCS 1v1 event, which was won by France's Axel "Mawkzy" Timone, defeating Brazil's Yan "yanxnz" Xisto Nolasco 4–3. Mawkzy thus qualified for the RLCS World Championship at Lyon-Décines in September. The second major of the season was won by Team Falcons and marked the Middle East's first RLCS international title since their introduction in 2021. The Middle East is, to date, the only region outside North America or Europe to win an RLCS international event. The second major's RLCS 1v1 final also saw Saudi Arabia's Hisham "Nwpo" Alqadi defeat Brazil's João "diaz" Henrique 4–1 to qualify for the 1v1 World Championship, where he faced Mawkzy for the title of RLCS's first 1v1 World Champion, and won 4–1 in the Grand Final. Also in the 2025 World Championship was the 3v3 event, where NRG Esports won against Team Falcons in the Grand Final.

The 2026 season started on 14 November 2025 and ended on 20 September 2026. The season introduced a new Kickoff Weekend LAN and a 2v2 circuit.

The Kickoff Weekend LAN happened on 5–7 December with the top 6 North American and European teams of Open 1. Each region's Open 1 continued on 5–6 December (Europe on the 5th and North America on the 6th) and the top 4 of each Open advanced to the 8 team stepladder bracket. The winner, Karmine Corp, qualified for the Boston Major and gave Europe an extra qualification spot for the first and second major and the World Championship.

The first Major of the season took place in Boston at the Agganis Arena from 19 to 22 February 2026. The qualification process took place from 14 November 2025 to 8 February 2026. The Boston Major consisted of 16 teams in a group stage and an 8 team hybrid elimination playoff bracket.

The second Major of the season took place in Paris in the La Défense Arena from 20 to 24 May 2026. The qualification process took place from 13 March to 26 April 2026. The Paris Major consisted of 16 teams in a group stage and a 12 team hybrid elimination playoff bracket.

The Rocket League 2026 World Championship occurred from 15 to 20 September 2026, once again at the Dickies Arena in Fort Worth, Texas. The Last Chance Qualification stage took place from 2 to 26 July. It consisted of an 8 team GSL play-in bracket, where the top 4 teams qualified for the group stage with the auto-qualified top 12. From there, the format was the same as the Paris Major. Team Falcons would win their first world title (and the first world title not won by Europe or North America), defeating NA's Spacestation Gaming in a clean 4-0 sweep.

The RLCS Club Championship was announced on 20 September 2026 as a separate competition away from the Majors and World Championship, unofficially acting as a transition season as Rocket League plans to switch to Unreal Engine 6 as part of a future update. The Club Championship will see 20 partnered organizations compete alongside 4 open qualified sides, first at a Kickoff event at the Copper Box Arena in London before transitioning to online league play, concluding in a 16-team finals tournament in 2027.

== Results ==
=== 3v3 Seasons and World Championships ===
Season	Dates	Winner	Finals	Runner-up	Location	Ref.
1	April – August 2016 Worlds: 6 — 7 August 2016	iBUYPOWER Cosmic	4–2	FlipSid3 Tactics	(United States) Los Angeles	
2	October – December 2016 Worlds: 3 — 4 December 2016	FlipSid3 Tactics	4–1, 4–1	Mock-It eSports EU	(Netherlands) Amsterdam	
3	April – June 2017 Worlds: 2 — 4 June 2017	Northern Gaming	4–2, 4–3	Mock-It eSports EU	(United States) Los Angeles	
4	September – November 2017 Worlds: 12 — 14 November 2017	Gale Force eSports	4–0	Method	(United States) Washington, D.C.	
5	March – June 2018 Worlds: 8 — 10 June 2018	Dignitas	4–1, 4–3	NRG Esports	(England) London	
6	September – November 2018 Worlds: 9 — 11 November 2018	Cloud9	4–1, 4–1	Dignitas	(United States) Las Vegas	
7	April – June 2019 Worlds: 21 — 23 June 2019	Renault Vitality	4–1	G2 Esports	(United States) Newark	
8	October – December 2019 Worlds: 13 — 15 December 2019	NRG Esports	4–3	Renault Vitality	(Spain) Madrid	
9	February – April 2020 ~~Worlds: 24 — 26 April 2020~~	Cancelled due to the COVID-19 pandemic				
X	August 2020 – June 2021 Championships: 15 — 20 June 2021	Cancelled due to the COVID-19 pandemic				
2021–22	October 2021 – August 2022 Worlds: 4 — 7 and 9 — 14 August 2022	Team BDS	4–1	G2 Esports	(United States) Fort Worth	
2022–23	October 2022 – August 2023 Worlds: 3 — 6 and 8 — 13 August 2023	Team Vitality	4–0	Team BDS	(Germany) Düsseldorf	
2024	January – September 2024 Worlds: 10 — 15 September 2024	Team BDS	4–2	G2 Stride	(United States) Fort Worth	
2025	January – September 2025 Worlds: 10 — 14 September 2025	NRG Esports	4–1	Team Falcons	(France) Lyon-Décines	
2026	November 2025 – September 2026 Worlds: 15 — 20 September 2026	Team Falcons	4–0	Spacestation Gaming	(United States) Fort Worth	

=== 3v3 Official RLCS LAN Events ===
Season	Major	Dates	Winner	Finals	Runner-up	Location	Ref.
2021–22	Fall Major	8 – 12 December 2021	Team BDS	4–1, 4–3	The General NRG	(Sweden) Stockholm	
2021–22	Winter Major	24 – 28 March 2022	G2 Esports	3–4, 4–2	Team Queso	(United States) Los Angeles	
2021–22	Spring Major	29 June – 3 July 2022	Moist Esports	4–3, 4–0	Team Falcons	(England) London	
2022–23	Fall Major	8 – 11 December 2022	Gen.G Esports	4–2	Moist Esports	(Netherlands) Rotterdam	
2022–23	Winter Major	6 – 9 April 2023	Karmine Corp	4–2	FaZe Clan	(United States) San Diego	
2022–23	Spring Major	6 – 9 July 2023	Team Vitality	4–2, 4–1	Team BDS	(United States) Boston	
2024	Major 1 (Copenhagen Major)	28 – 31 March 2024	Gentle Mates	4–2	G2 Stride	(Denmark) Copenhagen	
2024	Major 2 (London Major)	20 – 23 June 2024	G2 Stride	4–1	Team Falcons	(England) London	
2025	Major 1 (Birmingham Major)	27 – 30 March 2025	Karmine Corp	4–0	The Ultimates	(England) Birmingham	
2025	Major 2 (Raleigh Major)	26 – 29 June 2025	Team Falcons	4–1	Dignitas	(United States) Raleigh	
2026	Kickoff Weekend	5 – 7 December 2025	Karmine Corp	4–0	Shopify Rebellion	(Denmark) Copenhagen	
2026	Major 1 (Boston Major)	19 – 22 February 2026	Gentle Mates	4-2	Team Vitality	(United States) Boston	
2026	Major 2 (Paris Major)	20 – 24 May 2026	Karmine Corp	4-1	Twisted Minds	(France) Paris	
Club Championship (2026-27)	Kickoff	9 – 13 December 2026				(England) London	

=== 1v1 Seasons and World Championships ===
Season	Dates	Winner	Finals	Runner-up	Location	Ref.
2025	March — September 2025 Worlds: 13 September 2025	(Saudi Arabia) Nwpo	4–1	(France) Mawkzy	(France) Lyon-Décines	
2026	May — September 2026 Worlds: 16—18 September 2026	(Morocco) Nass	4–2	(Saudi Arabia) Nwpo	(United States) Fort Worth	

=== 2v2 Seasons and World Championships ===
Season	Dates	Winner	Finals	Runner-up	Location	Ref.
2026	May — September 2026 Worlds: 17—20 September 2026	No Miss Just Fake	4-3	Team Falcons	(United States) Fort Worth	

== Statistics ==
=== Team Titles ===
* Team or organization no longer participates in Rocket League esports.

Team	Region	World Championships	Majors	Total
Team BDS	EU	2	1	3
Team Vitality	EU	2	1	3
NRG Esports	NA	2	0	2
Team Falcons	MENA	1	1	2
G2 Esports	NA	0	2	2
Karmine Corp	EU	0	3	3
Gentle Mates	EU	0	2	2
Gen.G Esports	NA	0	1	1
Moist Esports	EU	0	1	1
FlipSid3 Tactics	EU	1	0	1
Cloud9	NA	1	0	1
Dignitas	EU	1	0	1
FlipSid3 Tactics	EU	1	0	1
Gale Force eSports	EU	1	0	1
Northern Gaming	EU	1	0	1

=== Player Titles ===
Turbopolsa has won the most World Championships with four. Vatira has won the most Majors with four.

* Player no longer participates in Rocket League esports.

Player	Real Name	Region	World Championships	Majors	Total
Turbopolsa	Pierre Silfver	EU, NA	4	0	4
Vatira	Axel Touret	EU	0	4	4
Kaydop	Alexandre Courant	EU	3	0	3
dralii	Samy Hajji	EU, MENA	2	1	3
M0nkey M00n	Evan Rogez	EU, MENA	2	1	3
Atomic	Massimo Franceschi	NA	1	2	3
ViolentPanda	Jos van Meurs	EU	2	0	2
Alpha54	Yanis Champenois	EU	1	1	2
BeastMode	Landon Konerman	NA	1	1	2
Daniel	Daniel Piecenski	NA	1	1	2
ExoTiiK	Brice Bigeard	EU	1	1	2
Extra	Alexandre Paoli	EU	1	1	2
Kiileerrz	Yazid Bakhashwin	MENA	1	1	2
Radosin	Andrea Radovanovic	EU	1	1	2
Rw9	Saleh Bakhashwin	MENA	1	1	2
Seikoo	Enzo Grondein	EU	1	1	2
zen	Alexis Bernier	EU	1	1	2
itachi	Amine Benayachi	EU	0	2	2
0ver Zer0	Ted Keil	NA	1	0	1
Remkoe	Remco den Boer	EU	1	0	1
Fairy Peak!	Victor Locquet	EU	1	0	1
GarrettG	Garrett Gordon	NA	1	0	1
gimmick	Jesus Parra	NA	1	0	1
jstn.	Justin Morales	NA	1	0	1
Deevo	David Morrow	EU	1	0	1
gReazymeister	Marius Ranheim	EU	1	0	1
kuxir97	Francesco Cinquemani	EU	1	0	1
Kronovi	Cameron Bills	NA	1	0	1
Lachinio	Brandon Lachin	NA	1	0	1
Markydooda	Mark Exton	EU	1	0	1
Scrub Killa	Kyle Robertson	EU	1	0	1
SquishyMuffinz	Mariano Arruda	NA	1	0	1
torment	Kyle Storer	NA	1	0	1
nass	Nassim Bali	EU, NA	0	1	1
Archie	Archie Pickthall	EU	0	1	1
Oski	Oskar Gozdowski	EU	0	1	1
ApparentlyJack	Jack Benton	EU, NA	0	1	1
Atow.	Tristan Soyez	EU	0	2	2
Chicago	Reed Wilen	NA	0	1	1
Chronic	Nick Iwanski	NA	0	1	1
JKnaps	Jacob Knapman	NA	0	1	1
Joyo	Joseph Young	EU	0	1	1
juicy	Charles Sabiani	EU	0	2	2
noly	Joseph Kidd	EU, NA	0	1	1
rise.	Finlay Ferguson	EU, MENA, NA	0	1	1
trk511	Mohammed Alotaibi	MENA	0	1	1

=== Coach Titles ===
* Coach no longer participates in Rocket League esports.

Coach	Real Name	Region	World Championships	Majors	Total
Ferra	Victor Francal	EU	1	2	3
Satthew	Matthew Ackermann	NA	1	2	3
d7oom-24	Abdulrahman Saad	MENA	1	1	2
Eversax	Benjamin Wagner	EU	0	2	2
Gregan	Mike Ellis	EU	1	0	1
mew	Théo Ponzoni	EU	1	0	1
Sizz	Emiliano Benny	NA	1	0	1
Snaski	Nicolai Vistesen Andersen	EU	0	1	1
Allushin	Braxton Lagarec	NA	0	1	1
Kael	Javier Ojeda	EU	0	1	1
n0ah	Noah Hinder	EU	0	1	1

=== World Championships ===
European teams have the most victories (8) followed by North America (4). Three organisations (Team BDS, Team Vitality and NRG Esports) have won two World Championships. Only one team outside of Europe and North America has won the World Championship, that being Team Falcons in 2026, competing from Middle East and North Africa. Five players have won the World Championship multiple times, Turbopolsa (4), Kaydop (3), ViolentPanda (2), M0nkey M00n (2) and dralii (2). Only 3 players have won consecutive titles, being Turbopolsa, Kaydop and ViolentPanda, with Turbopolsa winning 3 in a row and the others winning 2.

=== Majors ===
European teams have the most victories (6), followed by North America (3), and Middle East and North Africa (1). One organisation, Karmine Corp, has won three Majors. Two organisations, G2 Esports and Gentle Mates, have won two Majors. Five players have won a Major multiple times, Vatira (4), followed by Itachi (2), juicy (2), Atow. (2) and Atomic (2).

=== Esports World Cup ===
After participating in the 2022 and 2023 Gamers8 tournaments, which were won by FURIA and Version1 respectively, the Gamers8 circuit rebranded into the Esports World Cup, with Rocket League being one of the titles for the 2024, 2025, and 2026. These would be won by Team BDS in 2024, Karmine Corp in 2025, and Team Falcons. They would defeat Team Falcons, Geekay Esports, and Spacestation Gaming respectively. dralli is the only player to win all 3 Esports World Cups.
