= Zain (gamer) =

American professional esports player

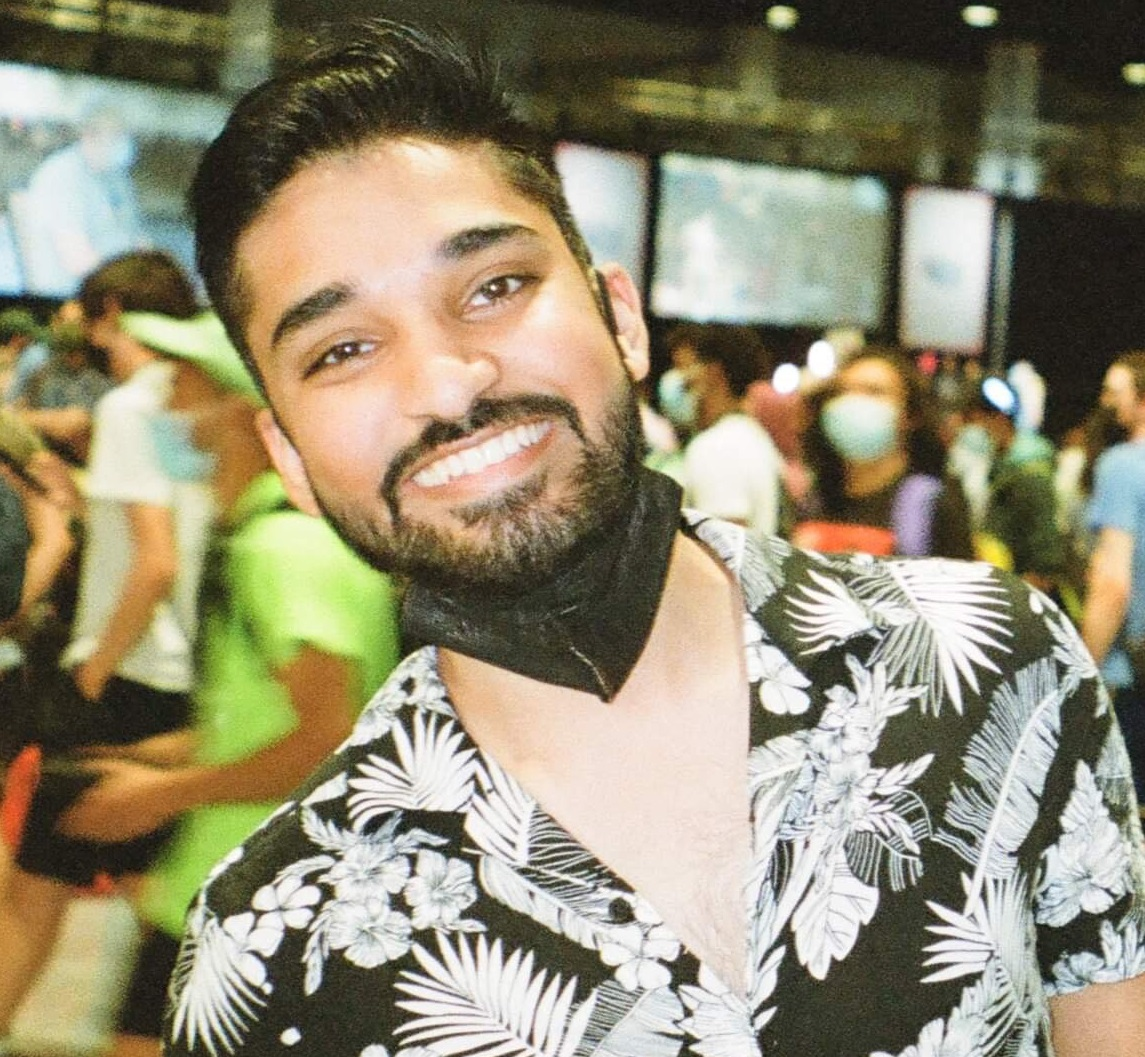
- Naghmi in 2023

Personal information
- Name: Zain Naghmi
- Born: June 11, 1996 (age 30)
- Nationality: American

Career information
- Game: Super Smash Bros. Melee
- Playing career: 2014–present

Team history
- 2018–2019: Panda Global
- 2020–2023: Golden Guardians
- 2023–2025: Moist Esports
- 2025–present: Shopify Rebellion

Career highlights and awards
- (28 majors won): 2x Shine champion (2018, 2022); 2x GENESIS champion (2020, 2022); 2x Ludwig Ahgren Championship Series champion (2020, 2022); 2x Super Smash Con champion (2023, 2025); 3x Get On My Level champion (2023, 2024, 2025); 2x Collision champion (2024, 2025); 2x Riptide champion (2024, 2025); 2x Pats House Champion (2024, 2026); 2x Battle of BC champion (2025, 2026); 2x Tipped Off Champion (2023, 2026); Smash Summit 10 champion (2020); Four Loko Fight Night champion (2020); Pound champion (2022); Ludwig Smash Invitational champion (2022); Fête 3 champion (2023); Wavelength champion (2024); Luminosity Makes Moves Miami champion (2024)

Twitch information
- Channel: ZainNaghmi
- Followers: 95,000
- Last updated: May 2026

Zain Naghmi (/zæn/ or /zeɪn/, born June 11, 1996), known mononymously as Zain, is an American professional Super Smash Bros. Melee player from Virginia. Beginning his career in 2014, he rapidly climbed the ranks, becoming a top 100 player in the world within only two years, a top 10 player since 2018, and was ranked the number one player in the world in 2022, 2024, 2025, and the 2026 summer season. Naghmi plays Marth and is currently considered the best Marth player in the world. He was sponsored by Golden Guardians from February 2020 to March 2023. In April 2023, he was signed by Moist Esports, which later merged with Shopify Rebellion, to which he is still signed.

His most notable tournament placings include first at GENESIS 7, GENESIS 8, and Get On My Level Forever, second at The Big House 9 and Smash Summit 11 and third at Smash Summit 12 and Super Smash Con 2019. A 2021 list compiled by PGstats ranked Naghmi as the ninth-greatest Melee player of all time.

== Early life ==
Naghmi was born on June 11, 1996, and grew up near Chantilly, Virginia. He is of Pakistani descent; his father Hasan emigrated to the United States from Pakistan in 1972 and works in real estate, while his mother Fatima works in cybersecurity. He has an older sister, Hena. In his youth, his sister purchased a GameCube and Melee, which they played together, sparking his interest in the game.

== Career ==
=== 2013–2017: Non-ranked beginnings ===
Zain first began competing in Melee tournaments in May 2014, with his first tournament being at "Smash @ Clarendon", a popular weekly event in Arlington, Virginia. He largely competed in local tournaments while in his first year at Virginia Tech, and had soon established himself as a formidable opponent among the Maryland/Virginia scene. Zain's breakout performance at a major tournament came in 2015, when he placed 33rd at Super Smash Con 2015, which was followed by a 1st-place finish at the MD/VA Fall Arcadian, the highest non-ranked tournament in the region.

=== 2017–2018: Beginning of professional career ===
Zain's 2017 season began with an appearance on the SSBMRank, a semiannual power ranking presented by Red Bull, where he was ranked as the 66th best Melee player for his performance in 2016. A heavy influence on the ranking was his performance at The Big House 6, where he placed 17th overall including a 2–0 victory over Justin "Plup" McGrath, who was ranked 6th in the world at the time. Zain's placing earned him some interest from Plup's team, Panda Global, who offered him a sponsorship; however, the deal never went through. 2017 saw high placements at several major tournaments which included 5th place at Super Smash Con 2017, bumping Zain up to 22nd on the SSBMRank 2017. He was again approached by Panda Global who offered him a full sponsorship - this time, Zain accepted, with the team officially announcing the signing on April 12, 2018.

=== 2018–2019: Panda Global and the rise to the top ===
Under Panda Global, Zain enjoyed success at major tournaments including first place finishes at Pound Underground, OMEGA II, and Shine 2018. However, despite his success, Zain parted ways with the team on November 8, 2019, along with teammates Cosmos and Kelazhur - no explanation for Zain's departure was given by either the organisation or Zain himself.

Zain also played for the MUN Huskies in the Collegiate Starleague (CSL), an intercollegiate esports league. The CSL hosted its grand final for the 2018 competitive season at Shine 2018, where the Hokies ultimately placed in second after losing to the University of Central Florida.

=== 2020–present: Mogul Moves, Golden Guardians and Slippi ===
Following his departure from Panda Global, Zain only competed in one tournament as a free agent. Two days prior to GENESIS 7, Twitch streamer Ludwig Ahgren announced his sponsorship of Zain for the tournament under his "Mogul Moves" clothing brand on January 22, 2020. Zain won Melee singles without losing a set, defeating Hungrybox - the number-one player in the world - in grand finals. As Zain's Mogul Moves sponsorship only lasted for the tournament, he became a free agent following GENESIS, but was soon signed by the Golden Guardians, the official esports organisation of the Golden State Warriors, on February 6, 2020. Since the signing, Zain has only competed in a few major tournaments - this was due to the COVID-19 pandemic, which prevented many live Melee events from taking place. However, with the release of the Project Slippi mod for Melee, matches and tournament could take place online. During the pandemic, Zain has won Pound Online, the Ludwig Ahgren Championship Series 2, and Smash Summit 10, all three of which took place online.

On April 17, 2022, Zain won GENESIS 8, his second consecutive GENESIS title. With this win, he became the first player since Adam "Armada" Lindgren to repeat as GENESIS champion. Zain would be ranked as the number 1 player in the world on PGstats Summer 2022 MPGR.

On October 23, 2022, Zain won the Melee portion of the Ludwig Smash Invitational.

In 2022, Zain was ranked as the number one Melee player in the world.

On March 29, 2023, Zain's contract with Golden Guardians ended. Shortly afterwards, on April 6, he signed with Moist Esports, under the Moist Moguls brand co-owned by MoistCr1TiKaL and Ludwig Ahgren.
