= Mighty Mike Plays controversy =

YouTube channel

Mighty Mike Plays
- YouTube profile picture
- Occupation: YouTuber
- Years active: 2026–present

YouTube information
- Channel: MightyMikePlays67
- Genre: Gaming
- Subscribers: 272 thousand
- Views: 4.13 million
- Last updated: November 3, 2026

Mighty Mike Plays (Mike Sarskiyan) is a 9-year-old American YouTuber known for a viral story in September 2026 in which he allegedly spent over $100,000 on his father's company credit card to purchase YouTube advertisements. The story was later discovered to be a hoax orchestrated by his father, David "Dave" Sarskiyan.

== YouTube channel ==
The channel was created on June 5, 2024, and Mike began uploading his gaming videos two years later.

In September 2026, Mike's father, Dave uploaded a video titled "Message from Dad...Mighty Mike Plays is Over.", falsely claiming that after setting up a $20 promotion for his son's Minecraft and Roblox videos, Mike kept the advertisements running for three weeks, resulting in a $118,000 bill charged to Dave's corporate credit card saved on his Google account and his subsequent firing. Within a few days, the video had reached three million views.

Dave launched a merchandise website instead of using a GoFundMe campaign, with shirts priced between $67 and $97. He faced skepticism and criticism online, including from YouTuber MoistCr1tikal suggesting that it could be a "scam".

Many in the YouTube community were unconvinced by Mike and Dave's story, and began to investigate to determine if the channel might be a scam. Allegations were made that Dave is actually a millionaire, and that the screenshot of Dave's American Express Gold Card bill was fake. These allegations have not been definitely proven, however, corporate records show that Dave Sarkisyan owns a marketing company named "Go The Distance Media". As a result of these allegations, Dave disabled and re-enabled YouTube comments, removed merch links, and threatened lawsuits.

On October 3rd, Dave uploaded a video responding to the hoax allegations, and promising to refund the money spent on the AI generated T-shirts. In the video, he mentions owning his own company, and that he did not expect that the YouTube video would go viral. He also clarified that being fired in this instance would refer to losing a contract with another company.
