= Turbopolsa =

Swedish professional Rocket League player

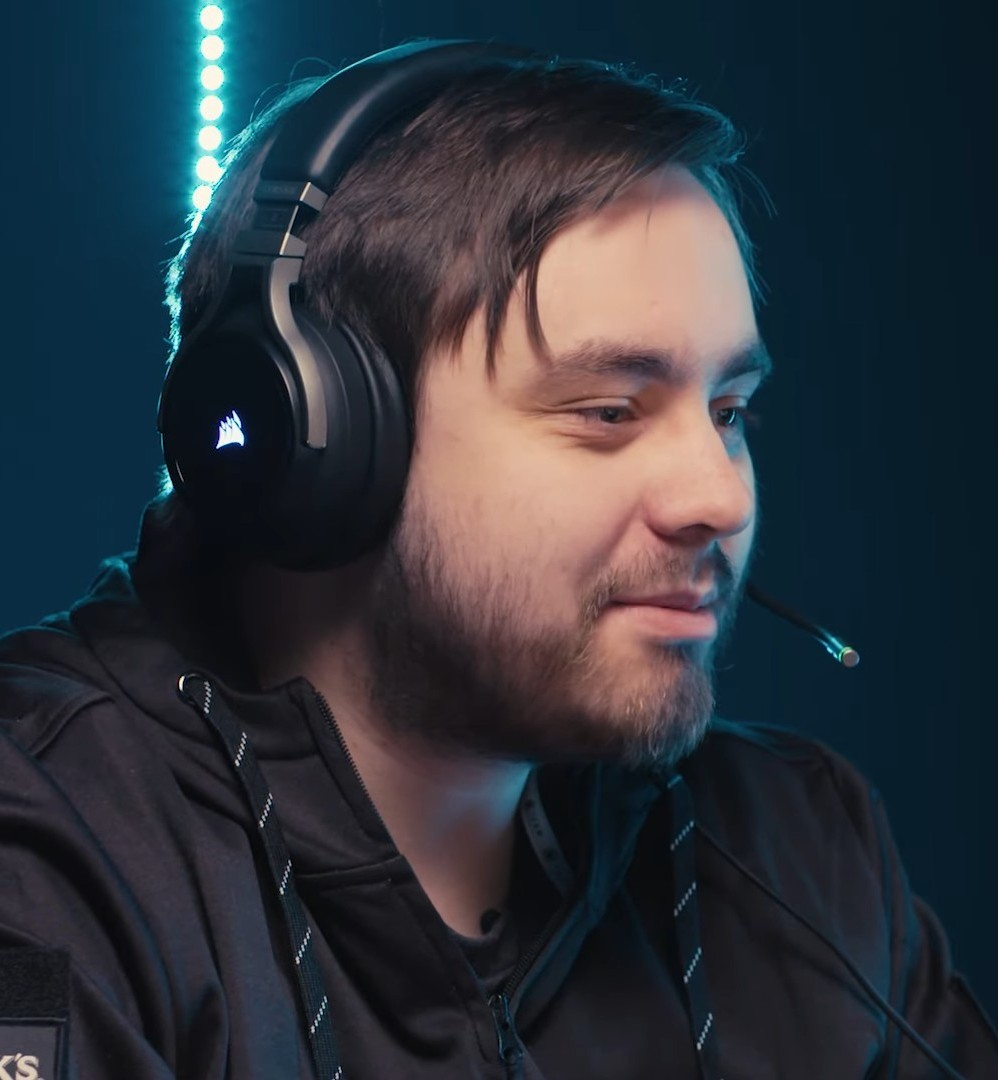
- Turbopolsa in 2020

Personal information
- Name: Pierre Silfver
- Born: August 9, 1998 (age 28)
- Nationality: Swedish

Career information
- Game: Rocket League
- Playing career: 2015–2023

Team history
- 8 Years: Northern Gaming, Gale Force, Dignitas, NRG, Team Envy, DarkZero

Career highlights and awards
- 4× RLCS Champion (seasons 3, 4, 5, 8); 2× RLCS Championship MVP (seasons 4, 8)

Pierre Silfver, also known as Turbopolsa, is a Swedish former professional Rocket League player.

Considered one of the greatest Rocket League players of all time, he has won four Rocket League Championship Series championships, the most out of any player. His first championship came in season 3 with Northern Gaming, where he was signed as a substitute player but was on the active roster for the entire championship tournament. The following season, he joined with Jos "ViolentPanda" van Meurs and Alexandre "Kaydop" Courant to form a roster that would win season 4 as Gale Force and season 5 as Dignitas. After leaving Dignitas at the end of season 7, he joined NRG Esports ahead of season 8, with whom he would win his fourth championship. His transfer made him the first RLCS player to move from Europe to North America. In season X he transferred to Team Envy, which he played with for two years before being moved to the substitute position. He played his final season with DarkZero Esports, and on the final day of the 2022/23 RLCS Winter Major, announced his retirement after eight years of professional Rocket League.

== Career ==
=== Early career ===
Turbopolsa began competing in Rocket League in community-organized tournaments. While he originally had no intention of playing the game professionally, after the team he was on made a deep run in a tournament held shortly before the launch of the Rocket League Championship Series, he and his then-teammates decided to compete together in the newly formed series. He began the inaugural season on KA-POW, before joining a competing team, Mock-It Esports, halfway through the season. In a 2018 interview, Turbopolsa expressed regret with the decision, stating that he later realized Mock-It only brought him on to ruin KA-POW's chances, and that he never felt welcomed by his new teammates. Mock-It was quickly eliminated from the inaugural championship tournament, and Turbopolsa left the team shortly after.

After failing to reach the championship tournament in season 2, Turbopolsa joined Northern Gaming as a substitute player for season 3, passing on starting roles in favor of joining a team he thought had a better chance of qualifying for offline tournaments. Northern Gaming decided to add a substitute to their roster because one of their starting players feared that he might be forced to miss tournaments due to his academic exams. Turbopolsa was called up to the starting roster late in the regional playoffs, and continued to play through the entirety of the main tournament, which ended with Northern Gaming claiming the Rocket League Championship Series season 3 championship in a win over Turbopolsa's former team, Mock-It. At the conclusion of the tournament, his teammate David "Deevo" Morrow was awarded the MVP award, but Deevo suggested that it should have gone to Turbopolsa instead.

=== Gale Force and Dignitas ===
Turbopolsa departed Northern Gaming at the conclusion of the third season, and shortly afterwards Gale Force captain Jos "ViolentPanda" van Meurs recruited both Turbopolsa and Alexandre "Kaydop" Courant. Kaydop was a member of the Mock-it team Turbopolsa had just defeated in the season 3 grand finals. After going 5–2 during the regular season, Gale Force went undefeated through the RLCS season 4 championship tournament, and Turbopolsa was named the tournament MVP. With the win, he became the first ever player to win two RLCS championship titles. The full three-person roster transferred to Dignitas for season 5, and again reached the grand finals of the season championships. The grand finals, against NRG Esports, was tightly contested, going to the final game of the best-of-seven series. In that game, NRG's Justin "jstn" Morales scored a tying goal after the clock had run out but before the match ended, forcing the match into overtime. Turbopolsa scored the winning goal in overtime, winning his third consecutive, and the full roster's second consecutive championship title. The Dignitas roster stayed together for season 6, and once again made it to the grand finals, however they were defeated by Cloud9, a team that had taken 3rd place at the tournament in the previous two seasons. Ahead of season 7, Kaydop departed Dignitas for Renault Vitality, and Dignitas failed to qualify for that season's RLCS championships. Turbopolsa departed the organization at the end of the season.

=== North America ===
Turbopolsa, who had up to this point competed in Europe, joined North American team NRG Esports for RLCS Season 8. He became the first player to transfer from Europe to North America, and the second player to transfer regions overall, in RLCS competition. The Game Haus' Connor Sanders called the signing "one of the most important roster moves the game has ever seen", noting that Europe was losing one of the region's most sought-after free agents, and NRG—already North America's strongest team—was gaining a multi-time champion. NRG advanced to the Season 8 finals, where they defeated Renault Vitality, which included Turbopolsa's former teammate Kaydop, in a seven-game series. The victory gave Turbopolsa his fourth championship, and he was once again awarded the tournament MVP award. He remains the only player with four RLCS titles.

Turbo continued to compete with NRG in the 9th season of RLCS, but the team struggled in several tournaments in 2020. The RLCS Season 9 championship was later cancelled due to the COVID-19 pandemic. Ahead of RLCS X, NRG announced they had removed Turbo from the starting roster. In June 2020, Team Envy announced they had signed Turbopolsa to compete in the upcoming RLCS X. In April 2022, he was benched by Team Envy. Two months later, Team Envy merged with OpTic Gaming, using the branding of the latter for their RLCS team.

For the 2022/23 season, DarkZero Esports attempted to build a roster around Turbo, but after failing to qualify for any Fall or Winter regionals, the organization pulled out of Rocket League Esports. Following continued health struggles, Turbopolsa announced his retirement from competitive Rocket League. He cited a diagnosis of moderate to severe diabetes as a major factor in his decision, noting the physical and mental challenges it imposed on his ability to maintain a professional playing schedule.

Following years at the top level of competition, Turbopolsa announced his retirement from professional Rocket League in late 2022. A major factor in his decision was his diagnosis of moderate to severe diabetes, which had increasingly impacted his health and daily performance. Managing the condition proved especially difficult in the high-pressure environment of esports, where long hours, irregular schedules, and travel made it challenging to maintain consistent blood sugar levels and overall wellness. Turbo later spoke about the mental and physical toll the disease had taken, describing how fatigue, difficulty concentrating, and strict medical routines began interfering with his training and gameplay.

In addition to his diabetes diagnosis, Turbopolsa faced challenges related to weight management and dietary habits. He openly discussed struggles with controlling his weight and an addiction to fast food, which compounded the difficulties of managing his health condition. The combination of these factors made it increasingly challenging to maintain the rigorous demands of professional play. Ultimately, he stepped away from the competitive scene to prioritize his health, earning respect from the community not only for his unmatched achievements but for his openness about the personal struggles behind the scenes.

Furthermore, Turbopolsa experienced complications from his diabetes that affected his lower extremities. He reported episodes of numbness and reduced leg strength, which impaired his ability to maintain the seated posture and foot coordination essential for high-level play. These physical limitations, combined with the demands of professional esports, contributed to his decision to retire and focus on his health.
