= Moist Esports =

American esports organization (2021–2025)

- Divisions: Guilty Gear Strive; Rocket League; Brawlhalla; Super Smash Bros.; Apex Legends; Street Fighter 6; Valorant
- Founded: August 11, 2021; 5 years ago
- Dissolved: January 17, 2025; 21 months ago (Merged into Shopify Rebellion)
- Owners: Charles White Jr.; Matt Phillips; Danny Palmer; Ludwig Ahgren; Nick Allen

Moist Esports was an American esports organization founded in 2021 by Charles White Jr., also known as MoistCr1tikal, and was co-owned by several others, including Ludwig Ahgren. The organization had teams competing in Guilty Gear Strive, Rocket League, Super Smash Bros. Melee, Super Smash Bros. Ultimate, Brawlhalla, Street Fighter 6, Valorant, and Apex Legends. Their Rocket League division won the Rocket League Championship Series 2021–22 Spring Split Major event in July 2022.

On January 17, 2025, White and Ahgren announced that they had become co-owners of Canadian esports organization Shopify Rebellion. As such, Moist Esports ceased operations, with their teams moving to Rebellion as a process; Moist had already collaborated with them on their Valorant team (known as Moist X Shopify, or MxS).

== History ==
On August 11, 2021, Internet personality Charles White Jr., known as MoistCr1tikal, announced the signing of Super Smash Bros. Ultimate player Kolawole "Kola" Aideyan and the formation of Moist Esports. By September, the organization expanded into two more esports, Guilty Gear Strive and Super Smash Bros. Melee. On May 5, 2022, Moist Esports created their Rocket League division after signing the former players of Team Queso.

On September 11, 2021, White revealed that he runs Moist Esports at a net loss. In the same video, he rallied 11 million of his subscribers to join Team Moist in the Omega Strikers event. The prize of the event awards the winning team 3% of the net revenue garnered during the first season of the game, and Team Moist took first place with over 2 million wins.

On January 25, 2023, Moist Esports announced that Ludwig Ahgren has joined as a co-owner, along with Nick Allen.

On February 26, 2023, Moist Esports expanded into Valorant with their team Moist Moguls. It was formed after the acquisition of Team BreakThru, and is the first expansion of Moist Esports after the arrival of Ludwig.

On April 6, 2023, Moist Esports signed Zain Naghmi, the top Super Smash Bros. Melee player in the world.

On January 17, 2025, Shopify Rebellion announced that White and Ahgren had joined the organization as co-owners. As a result, the two entities merged, with Shopify Rebellion taking Moist's teams on.

== Divisions ==
=== Apex Legends ===
On September 6, 2022, Moist Esports announced the creation of an Apex Legends team, signing three players from the former Team Burger. The Moist Esport Apex Legends team was signed on by Electronic Arts in 2023 as one of the twelve teams partnered for Year Four of the Apex Legends Global Series (ALGS) in the following year.

In January 2024, White went public on difficulties Moist Esports had with United States Citizenship and Immigration Services in immigrating the two Australian members of the team, Matthew "Emtee" Trengrove and Ben "Wxltzy" Walton. In anticipation of the 2024 ALGS Split One, both athletes were twice denied entry into the United States, and consequently arrived in Canada in order to accommodate and compete from there. The USCIS agent overseeing the requests responding to Moist Esports stated the official championship rankings of the team (4th in NA) provided by ALGS among other credentials was "insufficient" and, regarding a senior manager at Electronic Arts that vouched to Moist Esports' authenticity, that they "[could not] determine that [the representative's position] is considered an official of a governing body in Esports". White condemned the lengthy proceedings and the unnamed agent handling their case, stating that he is "happy to say [Moist Esports is] still struggling because the agent is a geriatric fossil that is out for some kind of vendetta," and alleged that other esport associates have actively worked to avoid business with the individual. On April 12, 2024, White announced in a video on his YouTube channel that the team would be separating due to being rejected numerous times by U.S. Immigration. Later that day, he announced on a live stream that he "will be pursuing the option of suing the U.S. Immigration department for their... mishandling of this case." Due to this situation, the team competed under the name "Not Moist" in the ALGS Year 4 Split 1 Playoffs. On May 3, 2024, he announced in a video that he is going through with suing the USCIS. The team would continue to play as "Not Moist" for Year 4 Split 2, but also played under the name "Mizuchi" during the Esports World Cup.

On September 29, 2024, Moist announced that they had signed the roster of Emtee, Xynew, Koyful and coach Don for the Year 4 Championship, taking Spacestation Gaming's slot with them. However, due to Moist merging with Shopify Rebellion in January 2025, the roster will play under the Shopify banner for the event.

=== Guilty Gear Strive ===
On August 31, 2021, Moist Esports created their Guilty Gear Strive division after signing Evo 2021 Online Guilty Gear Strive Champion Julian "Hotashi" Harris.

=== Brawlhalla ===
On September 22, 2021, Moist Esports announced the signing of Zack "Boomie" Bielamowicz.

=== Rocket League ===
On May 5, 2022, Moist Esports created their Rocket League division after signing the former players of Team Queso; Joe "Joyo" Young, Finlay "rise." Ferguson and Axel "Vatira" Touret. The team went on to win the Rocket League Championship Series 2021–22 Spring Split Major event in London, on July 3, 2022. In the 2022 Rocket League Championship Series World Championship, Moist Esports lost to FURIA Esports, 4–3, in the quarterfinals. On September 8 Axel "Vatira" Touret was removed from the starting roster and then released on the 20th. Then, on September 21 Moist announced the signing of Maëllo "AztraL" Ernst. On January 9, 2023, it was announced that rise would be leaving Moist for Oxygen Esports. He was replaced by Charles "juicy" Sabiani on January 12. On April 15, 2024, Moist Esports released their roster into free agency. 3 days later, Moist Esports announced their new roster, consisting of Aris, Fiv3Up, and Andy, along with Blaze as substitute. On July 11, 2024, Moist Esports announced that they would be releasing their current roster.

=== Super Smash Bros. ===
Moist Esports' first-ever signing was Super Smash Bros. Ultimate player Kolawole "Kola" Aideyan on August 11, 2021. The organization signed a second Super Smash Bros. Ultimate player later that month named Aaron "Aaron" Wilhite. The team debuted at Beyond the Summit's Smash Ultimate Summit Three event. The organization entered the Super Smash Bros. Melee esports scene after signing Kurtis "moky" Pratt in September 2021. Moist Esports would sign Alexis "Goblin" Stennett on September 15, 2021, as well as Paris Ramirez Garcia, a.k.a "Light" on September 15, 2021. By April 2022, the team had signed a total of four players to their Ultimate division.

On April 6, 2023, Zain signed with Moist Esports, under the Moist Moguls brand.

=== Valorant ===
On February 26, 2023, Moist Esports expanded into Valorant, with their team Moist Moguls. It was formed by the acquisition of Team BreakThru, including all of the 5 active players, the head coach, and their manager apex (Austin Copeland). On April 8, Moist Esports entered the marginalized gender-focused Game Changers program of Valorant by temporarily signing the team CLG Red. CLG Red had qualified for the North America Series One tournament before being let go from their organization Counter Logic Gaming following its shuttering and acquisition by NRG Esports. After member Emily "mle" Peters had reached out to co-owner Ludwig, the organization agreed to sign and to financially support them for the tournament's duration, with the team rebranding as Moist Moguls Red. Despite the temporary arrangement due to not being financially equipped for the sudden partnership, Moist pledged to help them find a new home following the tournament.

On September 20, 2023, the official Moist Esports X account announced that the Moist Moguls would be merging with Shopify Rebellion under the name of Moist x Shopify Rebellion. One of the Co-owners of Moist Esports, Ludwig Ahgren, has stated that "...and it should be referred to as MxS...". Ludwig and White would sign on as co-owners of Shopify Rebellion in January 2025, and as such the team would fully be renamed to Shopify Rebellion.
