= Cloud9 =

American esports organization

Cloud9 Esports, Inc.
- Type: Private
- Industry: Esports
- Founded: 2013
- Founders: Jack Etienne; Paullie Etienne
- Headquarters: Santa Monica, California, U.S.
- Key people: Jack Etienne (CEO); Paullie Etienne (COO); Jonathan Tran (President)
- Revenue: ▲US$35 million (2021)
- Total equity: ▲US$380 million (2022)
- Divisions: Apex Legends; Deadlock; EA Sports FC; Fortnite; Halo; Hearthstone; League of Legends; League of Legends: Wild Rift; Mobile Legends: Bang Bang; Rocket League; Super Smash Bros. Melee; Teamfight Tactics; Tom Clancy's Rainbow Six Siege; Valorant; World of Warcraft; Counter-Strike 2; Call of Duty
- Website: cloud9.gg

Cloud9 Esports, Inc., or simply Cloud9 (C9), is an American professional esports company based in Santa Monica, California. The company was originally founded as a professional League of Legends team by Jack and Paullie Etienne in May 2013 and was incorporated into Cloud9 Esports, Inc. on September 6, 2016. Cloud9 has received US$78 million in total raised equity via venture capital funding and was ranked the world's fifth-most valuable esports organization in mid-2022.

Cloud9 has held divisions in numerous esports throughout its existence, establishing eight by 2014. In 2018, Cloud9 won three international championships: the Rocket League Championship Series Season 6 World Championship, the 2018 Overwatch League Grand Finals, and the ELEAGUE Major: Boston 2018. The company currently operates four franchised teams: Cloud9 League of Legends of the League Championship Series (LCS), Cloud9 Valorant of the Valorant Champions Tour Americas, Cloud9 New York in the Call of Duty League and Cloud9 Rainbow Six in the BLAST R6 North America League. They previously operated the London Spitfire in the Overwatch League. They also operate or have operated non-franchised teams in Apex Legends, Counter-Strike 2, Deadlock, EA Sports FC, Fortnite, Halo, Hearthstone, League of Legends: Wild Rift, Mobile Legends: Bang Bang, Rocket League, Super Smash Bros., Teamfight Tactics, and World of Warcraft.

== History ==
=== 2013: Beginnings ===
The team that would become Cloud9 originated after esports organization Quantic Gaming released all of their League of Legends players, these being Balls (An Van Lee), Meteos (William Hartman), Hai (Hai Du Lam), Sneaky (Zachary Scuderi) and LemonNation (Daerek Hart). Afterward, all five players formed their own team under the moniker Team NomNom, later rebranding to Cloud9 in early 2013. Cloud9 was then reacquired by Quantic Gaming on April 1, 2013, and later rebranded the team back to Cloud9. The team then changed hands again in May 2013, as former Team SoloMid manager Jack Etienne and Paullie Etienne bought out the contracts of the players for less than $20,000, officially creating the Cloud9 organization. Paullie Etienne was appointed the chief operating officer, and Jack Etienne's father eventually signed on as the organization's first legal counsel.

=== 2013–2018: Expansion and funding ===
After early success in the organization's League of Legends division, Cloud9 expanded their brand into other esports. The organization entered Smite esports in December 2013. In 2014, Cloud9 created divisions for Dota 2, Super Smash Bros. Melee, Hearthstone, Counter-Strike: Global Offensive, Heroes of the Storm, and Halo. The organization disbanded their Smite division the same year due to internal issues, just prior to the start of the Smite Pro League, but it was reopened in January 2015. Throughout 2015 and 2016, Cloud9 established several more divisions, including Call of Duty, Overwatch, and their first touchscreen esport Vainglory. On September 6, 2016, the organization incorporated into Cloud9 Esports, Inc.

Although several of their divisions would dissolve, by March 2017, the company had ten teams across multiple titles and over one million fans spending a collective 15 million hours following Cloud9 players. That month, Cloud9 received a total of US$28 million from series A funding in a round led by Founders Fund, along with other investors Craft Ventures, former Facebook, Inc. executive Chamath Palihapitiya, Reddit Inc. cofounder Alexis Ohanian, and Major League Baseball player Hunter Pence. In July 2017, Cloud9 created their Rocket League division. The following month, Activision Blizzard announced that Cloud9 had purchased a London-based franchise slot for the upcoming Overwatch League (OWL); with the requirement that all organizations in the OWL create separate business entities and branding, Cloud9 created the subsidiary under the name London Spitfire. In November 2017, Riot Games announced that Cloud9 had secured a League of Legends Championship Series franchise slot for a reported US$10 million, marking the second owned franchised team by the company.

In June 2018, Cloud9 announced a major sponsorship deal with Red Bull, which included a deal that would place the Red Bull logo on the Cloud9 jerseys. In the middle of that deal, Jack Etienne invited 30 investors to a London Spitfire match at Blizzard Arena; four months later, Cloud9 announced that it had received US$50 million in series B funding in a round led by Valor Equity Partners, along with other investors TrueBridge Capital Partners, Reimagined Ventures, and Glassdoor founder Robert Hohman. Additionally, Valor Equity Partners founder and managing partner Antonio Gracias joined Cloud9's board of directors as a part of the deal. Funding from the round was to be used to establish a 20,000–30,000 square foot (1,900–2,800 m^{2}) headquarters and training facility in Los Angeles, which was expected to be completed by the end of 2019. After the investment, Forbes ranked Cloud9 as the world's most valuable esports company at US$310 million.

=== 2018–present: Success, controversy, and league owners ===
In 2018, at a time when many esports teams were significantly downscaling their operations and only focusing on a select few games, Cloud9 reached top-level international success in Counter-Strike, Rocket League, Overwatch, and League of Legends. The success of the organization led to Jack Etienne being named Game Shakers' Shaker of the Year in December 2018, an award honoring people who have made a long-lasting impact in the esports industry and helped raise esports awareness around the world. In the following months, Cloud9 entered sponsorship deals with apparel brand Puma, telecommunications company AT&T, and automotive company BMW, in what were all the companies' first team sponsorships in esports. In that time, Cloud9 has established an Apex Legends division.

In November 2019, Cloud9 was fined by Riot Games for violating League of Legends Championship Series (LCS) rules. Dating back to July 2018, Cloud9 had issued equity to seven of its LCS players through restricted stock units; Riot had created a rule in November 2017 that prohibited any team owner from being on the team's roster. Cloud9 was fined $25,000 for each player violation, totaling $175,000, and had to pay additional money to its players. Riot estimated the total fine to be $330,000 to $605,000. Cloud9 was again ranked by Forbes as the world's most valuable esports company in 2019, along with Team SoloMid; the company was valued at $400 million, a $90 million increase over the previous year.

In February 2020, it was announced that Cloud9, along with esports organizations Immortals Gaming Club, Dignitas' parent company New Meta Entertainment, Gen.G Esports, c0ntact Gaming, and OverActive Media, had established Counter-Strike: Global Offensive league Flashpoint, the first professional esports league owned and operated by team organizations. The following month, Cloud9 reentered Dota 2 esports after a hiatus of almost three years. Cloud9 created its Valorant division in April 2020, and in October, they created their first all-female esports team for Valorant. Forbes ranked Cloud9 as the world's second-most valuable esports company at $350 million in 2020, a 13% decrease from 2019. In May 2022, Forbes ranked them the fifth-most valuable, with a value of $380 million.

On May 6, 2024, the Esports World Cup Foundation, funded by the Saudi Arabia Public Investment Fund and organizers of the Esports World Cup tournament series, announced the 30 organizations (known in the ESWC as Clubs) who would make up the Club Support Program, with Cloud9 being one of them. This program gives teams a one-time six-figure stipend if an organization is willing to enter new esports as well as additional funding each year if they drive viewership and fan engagement to the Esports World Cup.

In February 2025, Cloud9 stepped away from Counter‑Strike 2 and re‑entered Rainbow Six Siege. In June, Cloud9 publicly denied rumours of a return to Counter‑Strike.

== Divisions ==
=== Deadlock ===
On November 9, 2026, Cloud9 signed the North American Deadlock team Melee Creeps, becoming the first major organization to have a roster in the title.

==== Roster ====
Cloud9 Deadlock roster
Players
Coaches

Handle	Name	Nationality
Saiah	Mendoza, Isaiah	United States
Lomein	Pham, Trivon	United States
AVG	Pirasteh, Sobhan	Canada
JonJon	Gross, Jonathon	United States
League	Rowand, Trentin	Canada
Zeno	Isakayev, Alex	United States

Head coach

Lukas "POSHYPOP" Villalpando

Legend:
- (I) Inactive
- (S) Suspended
- Substitute
- (injured) Injury / Illness

Latest roster transaction: November 9, 2026.

=== League of Legends ===
==== History ====
Cloud9 was officially created in 2013 after Jack Etienne purchased the contracts of all of Quantic Gaming's League of Legends players.

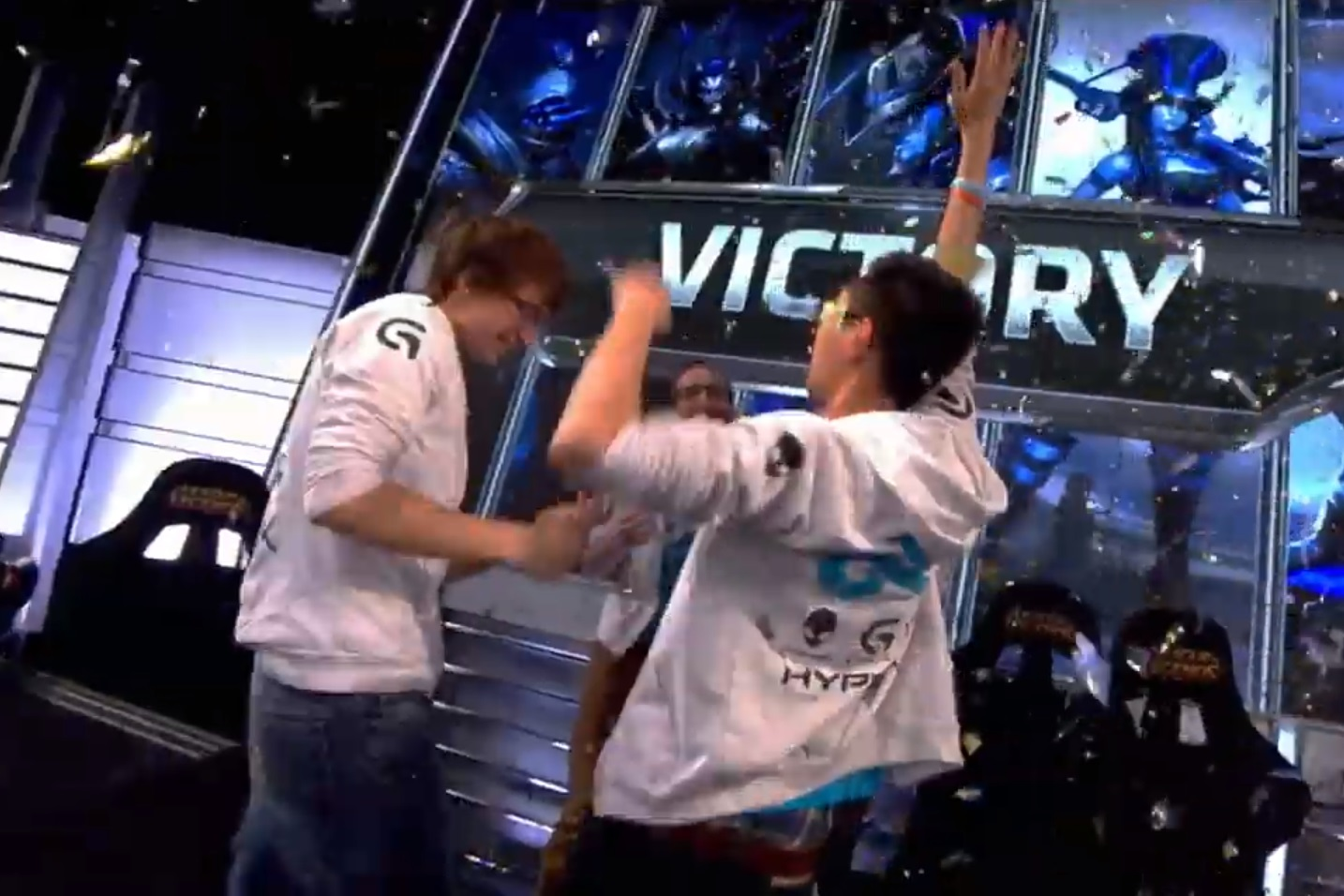
Cloud9 won back-to-back NA LCS championships in 2013 and 2014.

With a starting roster of Balls, Meteos, Hai, Sneaky, and LemonNation, Cloud9 went on a 13-game winning streak in the 2013 NA LCS Summer Split regular season, marking the longest winning streak in LCS history at the time. After claiming the top seed in the Summer Split Playoffs, the team went on to sweep the defending champions Team SoloMid, 3 games to 0, in the finals on September 1 to claim their first-ever LCS title. With the win, Cloud9 finished the season with a 30–3 game record and the highest winning-percentage in LCS history at 90.9%. In the 2014 NA LCS Spring Split, Cloud9 closed out the final five weeks on a 13-game winning streak, equaling their LCS record 13-game winning streak in 2013, and once again claimed the top seed in the playoffs. Cloud9 won their second consecutive LCS title after a 3–0 sweep over Team SoloMid in the finals on April 20. After going 5–0 in the playoffs, Cloud9 extended their record winning streak to 18 games and had gone undefeated in back-to-back playoffs. Cloud9 made it to the LCS finals in the 2014 NA LCS Summer Split and 2015 NA LCS Spring Split, but fell to Team SoloMid each time. In May 2015, Hai retired, ending Cloud9's nearly 750-day record of having the longest standing lineup in professional League of Legends history.

The team finished 2015 NA LCS Summer Split with a 6–12 record, their lowest regular season finish ever, and missed the LCS playoffs for the first time in their organization's history. In the 2016 NA LCS Spring Split, the team faced Team SoloMid in the quarterfinals but fell by a score of 1–3. In the quarterfinals match of the 2016 NA LCS Summer Split against Team EnVyUs, Cloud9's Jensen set an LCS record 20 kills in a single game. The team later fell to Team SoloMid in the finals. In the 2017 NA LCS Spring Split, for the sixth, and second consecutive, time, Cloud9 faced Team SoloMid in the NA LCS finals, but the team fell, 2–3. Cloud9 lost to Team Dignitas in the quarterfinals of the 2017 NA LCS Summer Split. In the 2018 NA LCS Spring Split playoffs, Cloud9 was swept by Team Liquid in the quarterfinals by a score of 0–3. The team again reached the finals in the 2018 NA LCS Summer Split, but they were swept by Team Liquid, 0–3.

After the 2018 NA LCS season, Cloud9 had their most successful League of Legends World Championship run. After advancing past the 2018 League of Legends World Championship group stage, Cloud9 swept Korea's Afreeca Freecs, 3–0, in the quarterfinals; The win marked the first time in seven years that a North American team had qualified for the World Championship semifinals. In the semifinals match. Cloud9 was swept by Fnatic, 0–3, ending their World Championship run.

In the 2019 LCS Spring Split, Cloud9 fell to Team SoloMid in the semifinals. After reaching the finals in the 2019 LCS Summer Split, the team fell to Team Liquid, 2–3. In the 2020 LCS Spring Split, Cloud9 finished the regular season with a 17–1 record – tied for the best game record in LCS history. The team secured their third LCS title on April 19, 2020, after they swept FlyQuest, 3–0, in the finals. The win gave the team their first LCS title since 2014; with an overall 26–2 game win–loss record, including playoffs, Cloud9 set an LCS record for the highest winning percentage ever in a single split by a North American team at 92.9%, breaking their own previous record of 90.9% from the 2013 Summer Split. Losses to Flyquest and Team SoloMid in the Summer Split playoffs not only eliminated the team from the LCS playoffs, but also eliminated Cloud9's ability to qualify for the 2020 World Championship, marking the first time in the organization's history that they would not attend the World Championship.

On September 14, 2020, Cloud9 parted ways with head coach Bok "Reapered" Hangyu, who had been the head coach of the team for the past four years. The organization promoted Cloud9's academy team coach Kim "Reignover" Yeu-jin as their new head coach.

In the 2021 LCS season, Cloud9 entered the Spring Split playoffs as the top seed, with a 13–5 record. C9 defeated Team Liquid in the finals, 3–2, and earned their 4th LCS title. At the 2021 Mid-Season Invitational, they failed to advance to the knockout stage. In the Summer playoffs, Cloud9 defeated Team SoloMid 3–2 to claim a spot at the 2021 League of Legends World Championship; however, they lost their next match to 100 Thieves. At Worlds, Cloud9 advanced to the quarterfinals, becoming the first North American team to make it past the group stage since the previous Cloud9 team reached semifinals in 2018. They lost in the quarterfinals to Gen.G, 0–3.

==== Roster ====
Cloud9 League of Legends roster
Players
Coaches

Role	Handle	Name	Nationality
Top	Thanatos	Park Seung-gyu	South Korea
Jungle	Blaber	Huang, Robert	United States
Mid	APA	Stearns, Eain	United States
Bot	Zven	Svenningsen, Jesper	Denmark
Support	Vulcan	Laflamme, Philippe	Canada

Head coach

- Nick "Inero" Smith

Assistant coach(es)

- Christian "IWDominate" Rivera
- Marius "Veigar v2" Aune

Legend:
- (I) Inactive
- (S) Suspended
- Substitute
- (injured) Injury / Illness

Roster updated November 25, 2025.

=== Hearthstone ===
On June 26, 2014, Cloud9 announced the formation of their Hearthstone division after acquiring team DogeHouse. Joining the team were the players Marcin "Gnimsh" Filipowicz, Cong "StrifeCro" Shu, Rumay "Hafu" Wang, Alexandr "Kolento" Malsh, and Jan "Ekop" Palys, with Gnimsh appointed as the team's captain. Additionally, the team picked up Andrew "TidesofTime" Biessener later that year. Kolento won the team's first major tournament after winning the Viagame House Cup #1 in October 2014; the following month, he won the DreamHack Hearthstone Championship. Kolento won the team's only major tournament in 2015 after winning CN vs EU Season 2 in March. The team picked up former Team SoloMid player Harry "Massan" Cheong in June 2015. In November 2015, Cloud9 parted ways with Hafu, TidesofTime, and Gnimsh. Cloud9 signed former team Archon player James "Firebat" Kostesich in March 2016. After being banned from Twitch in May 2016, Cloud9 parted ways with Massan. Several days later, the team signed Sanghyeon "DDaHyoNi" Baek. In May 2016, StrifeCro took home the OGN Hearthstone Seoul Cup World Invitational. Later that month, Cloud9 parted ways with Ekop. In March 2017, Firebat left the team. StrifeCro left the team in May 2017. In December 2018, Cloud9 signed Cho "Flurry" Hyun-soo, Kim "LookSam" Jin-hyo, and Jang "DawN" Hyun-jae. In March 2019, Kolento won StarLadder Hearthstone Ultimate Series Winter. The team signed Lee "Portia" Dongjae in August 2020.

==== Roster ====
Cloud9 Hearthstone roster
Players	Coaches
Handle / Name / Nationality; Kolento / Malsh, Aleksandr / Ukraine	Head coach: Vacant
Legend: (I) Inactive; (S) Suspended; Substitute; (injured) Injury / Illness	Latest roster transaction: August 20, 2020.

=== Tom Clancy's Rainbow Six Siege ===
Cloud9 announced that they were adding Rainbow Six Siege to their competitive roster on Twitter on June 18, 2018. However, the team that was originally put together by Cloud9 was eventually moved to Team Reciprocity, announced by Team Reciprocity on January 7, 2019. Cloud9 announced that it was re-entering the Rainbow Six Siege competitive circuit on April 6, 2019, with a new team of five players, one coach, and one assistant coach. They changed their roster of players to swap two of their players for the upcoming season. On August 15, 2021, Cloud9 announced that the organization would part ways with their Rainbow Six roster.

On June 12, 2024, Cloud9 announced that they would return to Rainbow Six Siege once more by partnering with beastcoast, who had a spot in the BLAST R6 North American League. The subsequent partnership would be known as Cloud9 Beastcoast.

On December 5, 2024, fellow North American esports organization M80 announced that they had bought beastcoast. Despite Cloud9 Beastcoast having qualified for the 2025 Six Invitational (SI), M80 already had a Rainbow Six Siege team that was also qualified to SI. As such, the Cloud9 Beastcoast roster was released with only a day until SI rosters were finalized. The former Cloud9 Beastcoast roster would play as "Unwanted" at SI, finishing in fourth place.

On February 15, 2025, Ubisoft announced that Cloud9 would be part of their "R6 Share" partner program beginning with the 2025 competitive season, which also meant they were invited to the new North American League.

==== Roster ====
Cloud9 Tom Clancy's Rainbow Six Siege roster
Players
Coaches

Handle	Name	Nationality
Centir	Medina, Deven	United States
Eddy	Diaz, Edwardo	United States
Ewzy	Troutner, Tyler	United States
Monk	Dawkins, Henry	United States
Panbazou	Feliciano, Roberto	United States

Head coach

Charles "Vivid" Stahelek

Legend:
- (I) Inactive
- (S) Suspended
- Substitute
- (injured) Injury / Illness

Latest roster transaction: November 7, 2026.

=== Valorant ===
==== Blue ====
===== 2020 =====
Cloud9 announced its entry into Valorant on April 12 by signing its first player, Tyson "TenZ" Ngo. Later Cloud9 would sign Skyler "Relyks" Weaver in June, Mitch "mitch" Semago and Josh "shinobi" Abastado in July, and the final member Daniel "vice" Kim in August. In First Strike: North America, Cloud9 lost 0-2 to T1 in the closed qualifier and did not qualify to the main event.

===== 2021 =====
On January 12, 2021, TenZ stepped down from the competitive scene to pursue content creation (while remaining as part of Cloud9). In the same month, Cloud9 Blue sign players Nathan "leaf" Orf from Chaos Esports Club's CS:GO division, and Son "xeta" Seon-ho from their former Korean team "Cloud9 Korea", as well as head coach Yoon "Autumn" Eu-teum and Manager Robin Lee. On February 5, 2021, Michael "poiz" Possis joins as the 6th player of the team. On March 11, 2021, TenZ is loaned to Sentinels for Masters Stage 1 in replacement of suspended player, sinatraa. On March 16, 2021, Daniel "vice" Kim parts ways with the team. On April 16, 2021, Skyler "Relyks" Weaver parts ways with the team. On April 19, 2021, Cloud9 transfers Ricky "floppy" Kemery and Erick "Xeppaa" Bach from their CS:GO division. On June 1, 2021, TenZ, who was previously on loan from Cloud9 Blue, is acquired by Sentinels. On March 13, 2021, Cloud9 Blue acquire Anthony "vanity" Malaspina from Version1. On September 10, 2021, floppy, parts ways with the team. On October 19, 2021, poiz is transferred to their Academy team. After failing to qualify for Masters Reykjavík in stage 2 and Masters Berlin in stage 3 they would qualify for the 2021 Valorant Champions in the North American Last Chance Qualifier beating Rise 3–0. At the Valorant Champions 2021, they would be put into Group D with FNATIC, Vision Strikers, and FULL SENSE; they would make it out of the group stage 2-1 before losing to Team Liquid in the quarterfinals.

===== 2022 =====
On May 15, 2022, Cloud9 traded xeta and Autumn to T1 for Rahul "curry" Nemani. Later on May 26, Cloud9 would sign assistant coach Joshua "m1cks" Micks. In VCT NA Stage 1: Challengers, Cloud9 narrowly missed out on Masters Reykjavik, placing third after losing to The Guard 0-3 in the lower final. Stage 2 did not fare well for them either, as this time they failed to qualify for the playoffs. Cloud9 were given a chance to qualify for VCT Champions 2022 through the VCT NA Last Chance Qualifier; however, they failed to do so as their season ended in a 0–2 loss to 100 Thieves.

Following the end of the 2022 season, Cloud9 were accepted into the partnership league as one of the ten teams representing VCT Americas. They announced their new roster consisting of core members vanity, leaf, and Xeppaa, and acquired Jordan "Zellsis" Montemurro who recently competed under Sentinels, OpTic Gaming superstar Jaccob "yay" Whiteaker, head coach Matthew "mCe" Elmore, and Mateja "qpert" Mijovic as substitute. With the signing of yay, the highest rated player in 2022, Cloud9 were considered by many to be a "superteam" and were expected to perform strongly in the 2023 season.

===== 2023 =====
At the onset of VCT 2023: LOCK//IN, Cloud9 began the season with a dominant win against Paper Rex but, to the shock of many, fell short to DRX in their subsequent match, eliminating them as a result. In the wake of this loss, Cloud9 made an unprecedented decision to release yay and vanity from their roster. On March 27, 2023, just days before the start of the Americas League, Cloud9 announced Dylan "runi" Cade and Jake "jakee" Anderson to the starting roster.

With this new roster, Cloud9 achieved a strong 9-1 record in the Americas League, earning them a bye in the league playoffs. However, in a surprising upset loss to Evil Geniuses and a narrow 1-2 loss to NRG, Cloud9 ultimately missed out on Masters Tokyo despite their outstanding performance in the regular season. In the Last Chance Qualifier for VCT Champions 2023, Cloud9 fell short yet again, ending their season with a 2–3 loss to LEVIATÁN.

On September 29, 2023, Cloud9 announced vanity, OXY, wippie, and head coach Immi to the starting roster, who would join existing members jakee and Xeppaa. Cloud9 would compete in various OFF//SEASON tournaments prior to the start of 2024, including the TEN Global Invitational in Busan, in which they emerged victorious, and Red Bull Home Ground #4 in Tokyo, in which they lost 2-3 to FNATIC in the grand finals (albeit with curry as a stand-in to replace wippie).

===== 2024 =====
Moving into the 2024 season, a poor performance in the inaugural Americas Kickoff tournament led to Cloud9's decision to release wippie and jakee. On March 30, 2024, Cloud9 announced the re-signing of runi as well as the signing of Kaleb "moose" Jayne, who would join the roster for VCT Americas: Stage 1 onward. In Stage 1, Cloud9 went 5-1 in matches and qualified to playoffs, but were immediately eliminated by G2 and could not qualify to Masters Shanghai. In Stage 2, Cloud9 extended their overall record to 6-4 and made playoffs once more, but were again eliminated in the first round, losing out 1-2 to KRÜ Esports. With this loss, Cloud9 is currently the only North American team to not qualify for a single international event since the debut of the partnership era.

On August 10, 2024, vanity was released from Cloud9 for the second time.

===== Roster =====
Cloud9 Valorant roster
Players
Coaches

Handle	Name	Nationality
FireBallOps	Tomaselli, Cameron	United States
GLYPH	Garcia, Conner	Philippines
alym	Baidyldaev, Torogul	Kyrgyzstan
Derrek	Ha, Derrek	United States
nightz	Verio-Smith, Christian	United States

Head coach

Ian "Immi" Harding

Legend:
- (I) Inactive
- (S) Suspended
- Substitute
- (injured) Injury / Illness

Latest roster transaction: November 7, 2026.

==== White ====
In October 2020, Cloud9 signed the orgless all-female team "MAJKL" to compete in First Strike under Cloud9 White. (with the all-male team rebranding to “Cloud9 Blue"). In November 2020, Dream joined as a head coach and MoonChopper as a strategic coach of Cloud9 White. Later in the month, Cloud9 White would fail to quality for First Strike: North America.

In January and February 2021, Cloud9 White would fail to qualify for the VCT 2021: North America Stage 1 Challengers 1, 2 and 3 Main Events. On March 12, 2021, Kaitlin "Keiti" Boop joined after being on trial. Later in March, Cloud9 White would qualify for the VCT 2021: Game Changers North America Series 1 in the first seed and later winning the tournament without losing a single map, a week later they would fail to qualify for VCT 2021: North America Stage 2 Challengers 1 Main Event. On April 13, Cloud9 White would release Keiti. In June, Cloud9 White would qualify for and win VCT 2021: Game Changers NA Series 2. The next month, Cloud9 White would fail to qualify for the VCT 2021: North America Stage 3: Challengers 1 and 2 Main Events before qualifying and winning VCT 2021: Game Changers North America Series 3. It was later announced that head coach Dream and Cloud9 parted ways a week prior to Series 3 qualifiers.

In February 2022, Cloud9 White would fail to qualify for VCT 2022: North America Stage 1: Challengers 1 Main Event but would go on to qualify and win VCT 2022: Game Changers North American Series 1. In June, Cloud9 would sign Reid "x0tek" Johnson as the new head coach while Annie would leave the team to pursue streaming, with Bob "Bob" Tran replacing her.

On December 20, 2022, Cloud9 announced that Cloud9 White was being disbanded, and all of the players were being dropped.

== Former divisions ==
=== Counter-Strike ===
Cloud9 entered the professional Counter-Strike: Global Offensive scene on August 1, 2014, with the acquisition of compLexity Gaming's North American roster. The players reportedly left compLexity after they received better offers from Cloud9 prior to renewing their contracts. Cloud9 made their first appearance at ESL One: Cologne 2014, where they finished 2–0 in Group D of the group stage but lost in the quarterfinals to Swedish team Ninjas in Pyjamas, who later won the tournament. On November 26, Sean "sgares" Gares replaced Spencer "Hiko" Martin as the team's in-game leader. On December 14, Hiko left Cloud9, to be replaced by Shahzeb "ShahZaM" Khan.

On April 24, 2015, Cloud9 released ShahZam and Kory "Semphis" Friesen. Five days later, Ryan "fREAKAZOiD" Abadir and Tyler "Skadoodle" Latham, formerly of iBUYPOWER, joined the team, and Braxton "swag" Pierce joined as an analyst, sgares stepped down from the roster on November 24.

Cloud9 placed thirteenth to sixteenth at MLG Columbus 2016, losing to Natus Vincere and G2 Esports in the group stage. Shortly after the event on April 12, it was announced that fREAKAZOiD would be leaving the team. Team Liquid's Eric "adreN" Hoag was subsequently announced as a temporary stand-in, playing for Cloud9 until Alec "Slemmy" White was announced as the official replacement on April 23. Manager Tres "stunna" Saranthus left the team on July 26. On August 17, Cloud9 announced that they were replacing Slemmy with Timothy "autimatic" Ta. On October 30, Cloud9 defeated SK Gaming 2–1 in a best-of-three series to win the ESL Pro League Season 4 finals in São Paulo, Brazil.

On August 15, 2017, Michael "shroud" Grzesiek and Jordan "n0thing" Gilbert left the team, with shroud announcing that he intended to become a full-time streamer.

On January 28, 2018, Cloud9 defeated FaZe Clan 2–1 at the ELEAGUE Major: Boston 2018 finals, becoming the first North American team to win a Major. On March 31, Cloud9's main AWPer, Tyler "Skadoodle" Latham, announced on Twitter that he was taking a break from professional play. On the same day, a much anticipated transfer occurred with Jacky "Stewie2K" Yip terminating his multi-year contract with Cloud9 to move to SK Gaming, although he would later join Team Liquid after only a brief stay with SK. shroud officially retired from competitive play and left Cloud9 on April 18.

Cloud9 announced on December 6, 2019, that Timothy "autimatic" Ta, Damian "daps" Steele, and Kenneth "koosta" Suen had been released from the organization and their contracts bought out by Gen.G Esports. A month later, on January 6, 2020, Cloud9 signed the South African team ATK's CS:GO roster.

On September 6, 2020, Cloud9 announced that they would undergo a complete rebuild in their CS:GO division. The players continued to play under the Cloud9 name until the new roster was completely formed. The next day, Cloud9 unveiled their new general manager Henry "HenryG" Greer and new coach Aleksandar "kassad" Trifunović. On September 10, Alex "ALEX" McMeekin signed a three-year contract with Cloud9. On September 19, Cloud9 acquired William "mezii" Merriman from GamerLegion and Özgür "woxic" Eker from mousesports. On October 7, Cloud9 re-signed Ricky "floppy" Kemery, who becomes the fourth player of the new team. The last player Patrick "es3tag" Hansen was bought from Astralis and was announced on October 15. On December 28, Aleksandar "kassad" Trifunović was released by Cloud9. On January 18, 2021, Özgür "woxic" Eker was released by Cloud9 following poor results as a team. On January 22, Erick "Xeppaa" Bach was announced as woxic's replacement on the team. On January 24, the return of Chris “Elmapuddy” Tebbit as new head coach was announced, along with the promotion of m1cks from analyst to the assistant coach position Cloud9 disbanded their CS:GO division in March 2021, citing difficulties due to the COVID-19 pandemic.

On April 24, 2022, Cloud9 returned to the CS:GO scene, this time in Europe, acquiring the roster of Gambit Esports.

Cloud9 won IEM Dallas on June 6, 2022, after defeating ENCE 3:0. Cloud9 won a grand prize of US$100,000.

Interz was replaced by Timur "buster" Tulepov on January 16, 2023. Cloud9 underwent more roster changes on July 13 of the same year, when buster and nafany were benched and replaced with former Natus Vincere players Denis "electronic" Sharipov and Ilya "Perfecto" Zalutskiy. Nafany departed Cloud9 to join the new Russian BetBoom roster on July 31.

Due to visa issues, buster filled in for Ax1Le as a substitute at IEM Cologne 2023. At the tournament, the team lost to Fnatic in the opening round, before achieving victories over 9INE, Monte and GamerLegion to secure play-offs. Ax1Le returned to the roster for the quarter-finals match against Team Vitality, where Cloud9 were eliminated 2-0.

On October 26, 2023, Cloud9 announced the stepping down of Dmitry "sh1ro" Sokolov. He would be replaced by Kirill "Boombl4" Mikhailov a week later, on November 2.

=== Overwatch ===
==== Pre-Overwatch League ====
Cloud9 formed its Overwatch division in March 2016 after signing team "google me". The team won several LAN events in April and May, such as the One Nation of Gamers Overwatch Invitational, Overkill, and the Alienware Monthly Melee. Their first major tournament post-release of Overwatch was the Agents Rising tournament, which they won after defeating Team Liquid in the finals.

Following Agents Rising, they finished second in both the June Alienware Monthly and Operation Breakout tournaments; both times they fell to Team EnVyUs in the finals. Later that month, Cloud9 finished in fourth place at the OG Invitational tournament after losing to Northern Gaming in the third-place match. After several wins in smaller weekly and qualifier tournaments, the team9 qualified for the Beyond the Summit (BTS) Overwatch Cup, Overwatch Open, and 2016 ESL Overwatch Atlantic Showdown. The team finished in second place at BTS after losing to Team EnVyUs in the finals, fell to Team EnVyUs in the group stage semifinals at the Overwatch Open, and did not make it past the group stage at the Atlantic Showdown. Cloud9 was one of four western teams invited to compete in South Korea's OGN Overwatch APEX Season 2, which began in January 2017. After falling to South Korean team KongDoo Uncia on February 28 in the group stage, Cloud9 was eliminated from the tournament.

Cloud9 failed to qualify for Overwatch Contenders North America season one; afterwards, the company acquired the former Laser Kittenz roster and established their European team Cloud9 EU for season one of Overwatch Contenders Europe. The following month, in September 2017, Cloud9 established their third Overwatch team after acquiring South Korean team KongDoo Panthera and competed under the moniker Cloud9 KongDoo. Cloud9 EU made it to the playoffs in Contenders Europe season one, but they fell to Misfits Gaming semifinals on October 7. Meanwhile, Cloud9 KongDoo had been competing in OGN Overwatch APEX Season 4, where they ended up taking third place after defeating NC Foxes on October 17.

==== London Spitfire ====
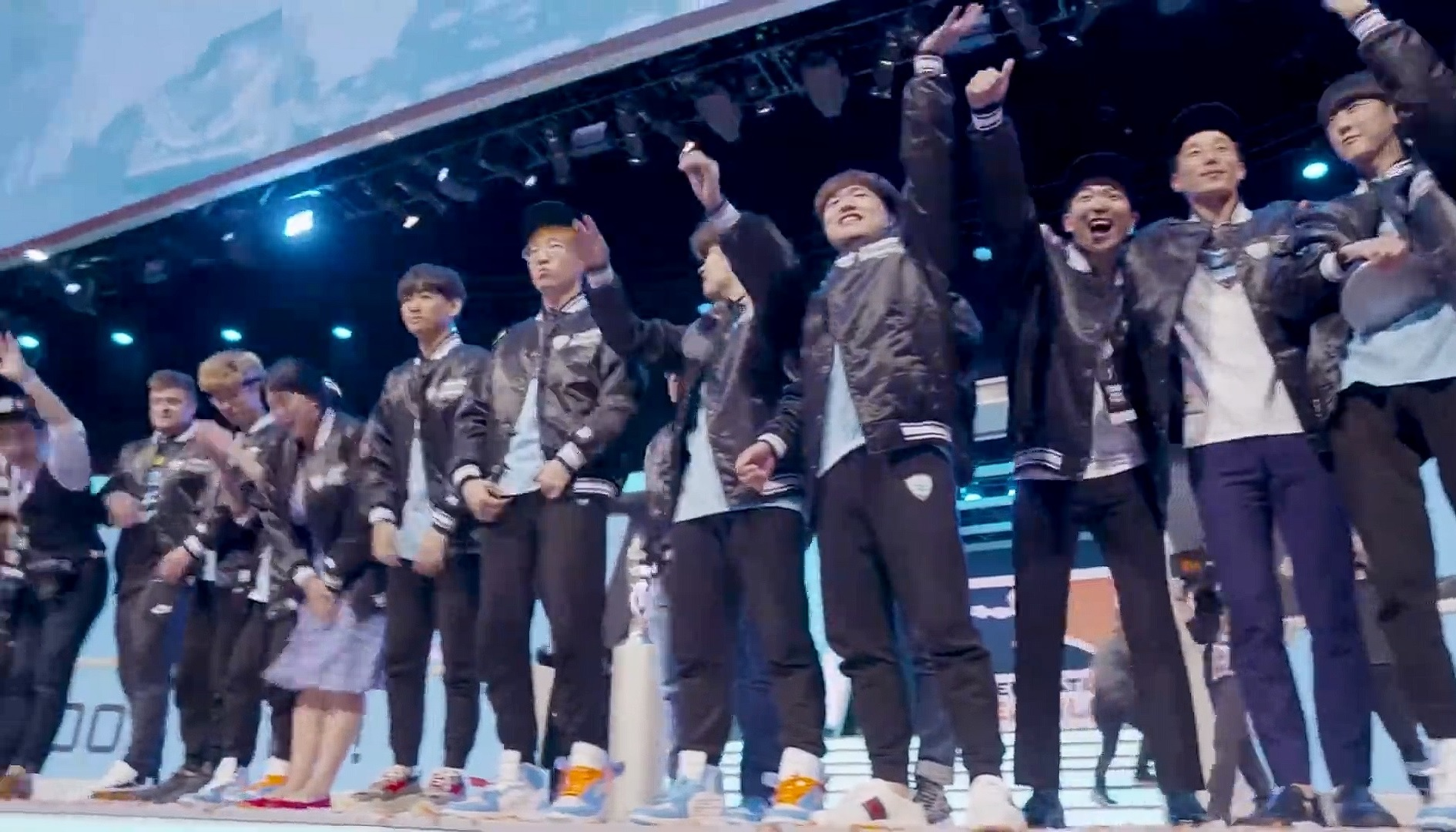
The London Spitfire won the 2018 Grand Finals.

On August 10, 2017, Activision Blizzard announced that Cloud9 had purchased a London-based franchise slot for the upcoming Overwatch League (OWL) for a reported US$20 million (£15.4 million); with the requirement that all organizations in the OWL create separate business entities and branding, Cloud9 created the subsidiary under the name London Spitfire. On November 9, they disclosed their 12-player inaugural season roster, the maximum permitted, which was an amalgamation of their Cloud9 KongDoo team and OGN Overwatch APEX Season 4 champions GC Busan. On February 15, 2018, the Spitfire's European Overwatch Contenders team was announced as the British Hurricane.

In the 2018 season, the Spitfire became the first-ever stage playoffs champions after defeating the New York Excelsior in the 2018 Stage 1 playoffs. In March, London parted ways with head coach Lee "Bishop" Beom-joon for undisclosed reasons. The team qualified for the Stage 2 playoffs, but they fell to the Philadelphia Fusion in the semifinals. London failed to reach the Stage 3 and Stage 4 playoffs and finished the regular season with a 24–16 record and the fifth seed in the 2018 Overwatch League playoffs. London defeated the Los Angeles Gladiators in the quarterfinals by a series score of 2–1 to advance to the semifinals. London won both games against the Los Angeles Valiant in the semifinals, advancing them to the 2018 Overwatch League Grand Finals. London faced the Philadelphia Fusion in the Grand Finals on July 27 and 28; in the best-of-three series, the Spitfire won the first two matches by scores of 3–1 and 3–0 to claim the inaugural Overwatch League title.

London began their 2019 season failing to qualify for the Stage 1 playoffs. The team qualified for the Stage 2 playoffs; however, they were knocked out in the quarterfinals by the Hangzhou Spark. The Spitfire parted ways with head coach Kwang-bok "Coach815" Kim in the middle of Stage 3, leaving the team without a head coach. London failed to qualify for the Stage 3 playoffs and finished the regular season with a 16–12 record, qualifying them for the 2019 play-in tournament for a chance to qualify for the 2019 season playoffs. London defeated the Shanghai Dragons, 4–3, in the play-in tournament in an OWL record eight-map series and qualified for the season playoffs. In the first round, London was defeated by the New York Excelsior, 1–4, sending the team to the lower bracket. A 0–4 loss to the San Francisco Shock the following match ended the Spitfire's 2019 playoff run.

=== Mobile Legends: Bang Bang ===
On June 11, 2024, Cloud9 announced that they had entered Mobile Legends: Bang Bang esports by signing North America's representatives for both the 2024 Mid Season Cup (formerly known as BloodThirstyKings) and 2024 Women's Invitational (formerly known as Reignfall), both held at the Esports World Cup in Saudi Arabia. The female roster disbanded sometime after MWI, while the male team disbanded on October 26, shortly after being reverse swept by BloodThirstyKings (who returned after Michael "MobaZane" Cosgun left Cloud9 for a soon to be disbanded Gaimin Gladiators) in the NACT Summer Grand Final, denying C9 a trip to M6.

=== Super Smash Bros. ===
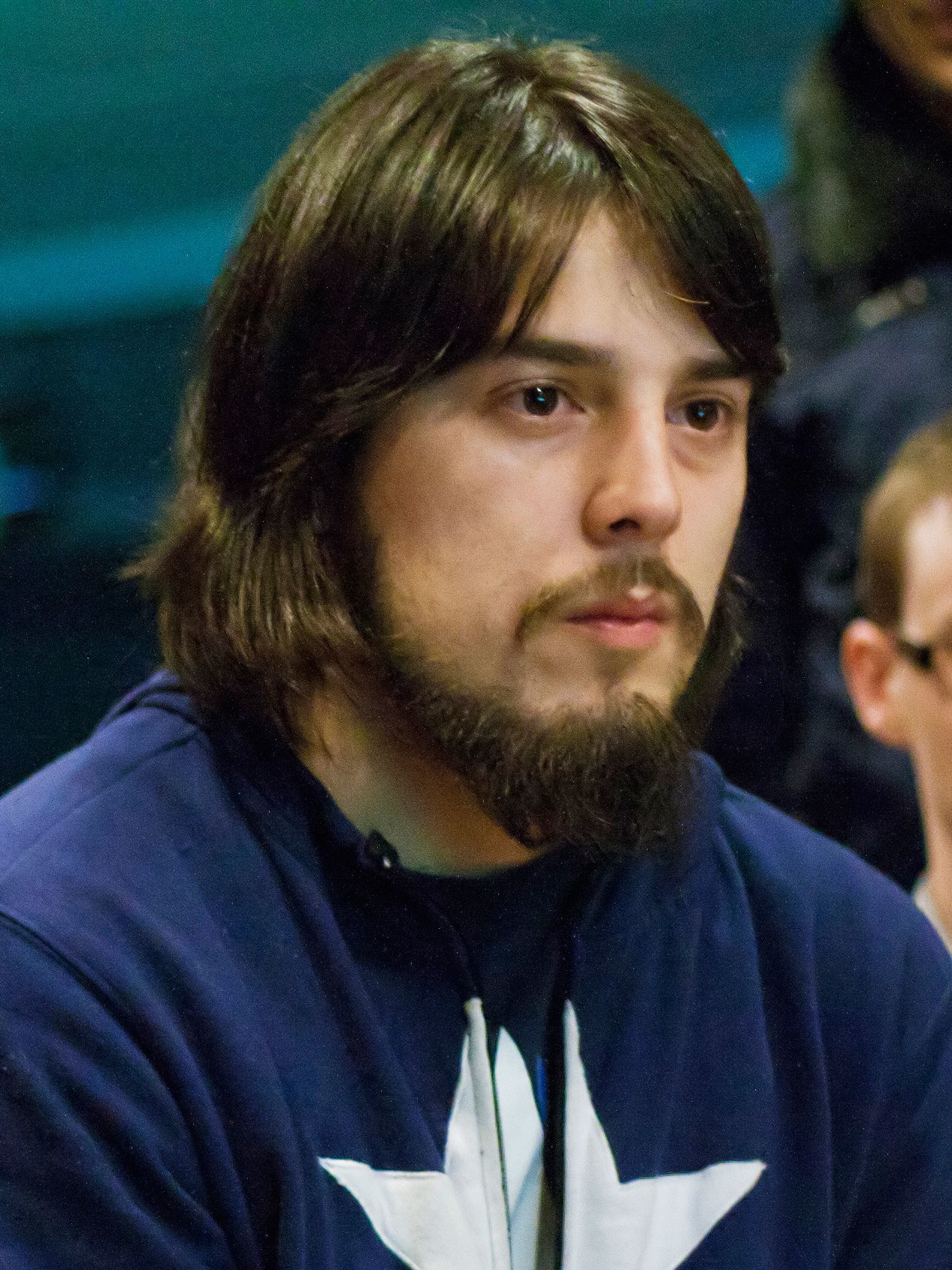
Mang0 played for Cloud9 from 2014 until 2025.

Cloud9 joined the Super Smash Bros. scene after picking up Evo 2013 champion Joseph "Mang0" Manuel Marquez for Super Smash Bros. Melee (Melee) in May 2014 and is currently the longest tenured player at Cloud9. Mang0's first tournament under Cloud9 was Get On My Level 2014 in Toronto, where he took first place. In June 2014, Mang0 finished in first and second at MLG Anaheim 2014 and CEO 2014, respectively, meeting Armada both times in the Grand Finals. The following month, Mang0 took home his second consecutive Evolution Championship Series (Evo) title after defeating Hungrybox in the Grand Finals of EVO 2014. In October 2014, Mang0 won The Big House 4 after defeating Mew2King in Grand Finals. In 2015, Mang0 finished in fourth place at Apex 2015 and third place at CEO 2015. At Evo 2015, Mang0 fell to Hungrybox in the lower bracket semifinals. At The Big House 5, Mang0 finished in fourth place after losing to Mew2King. Mang0's first tournament of 2016 was at GENESIS 3 in January, where he fell to Armada in the grand finals. The following month, Mang0 finished in second place at PAX Arena after losing to Hungrybox in the finals. He secured his first major tournament championship of 2016 in May after defeating Hungrybox in the finals at DreamHack Austin. The same month, he finished second at Get On My Level 2016 after falling to Leffen in the finals. In July 2016, Mang0 finished in fourth place at Evo 2016 after falling to Hungrybox in the lower bracket semifinals. The following month, he took first place at Super Smash Con 2016 after taking down Hungrybox in the finals.

In August 2016, the organization added their second Super Smash Bros. player with the addition of Evo 2016 champion Elliot "Ally" Bastien Carroza-Oyarce for Super Smash Bros. for Wii U (Smash 4). Mang0 and Ally both attended The Big House 6 in October 2016. Ally, citing health concerns, dropped out of the Smash 4 tournament after falling to the lower bracket. Mang0 took home his second The Big House title under Cloud9 after defeating Armada in the Melee finals. At the end of 2016, Cloud9 signed Daniel "Tafokints" Lee as Mang0's coach.

Ally and Mang0 competed in GENESIS 4 in January 2017. Both Cloud9 members took second place in their respective tournaments, with Ally falling to MKLeo in the Smash 4 finals and Mang0 falling to Armada in the Melee finals. At EVO 2017, Ally failed to defend his Smash 4 EVO title from 2016, finishing outside the top 32. In the Melee tournament, Mang0 reached the grand finals, but he fell to Armada in the finals match to finish in second place. The following month, Mang0 defended his Super Smash Con title after winning Super Smash Con 2017. The two competed at The Big House 7 in October 2017. Ally finished the Smash 4 tournament in the top eight, while Mang0 finished in the top six of the Melee tournament. In January 2018, Ally and Mang0 competed at GENESIS 5, with Ally finishing in ninth place and Mang0 finishing in fifth.

On March 31, 2018, Mang0's coach Tafokints announced he was departing the organization to join Counter Logic Gaming as their business development manager. Five days later, Cloud9 parted ways with Ally.

At Evo 2018, Mang0 finished in the top eight. Mang0 competed in his first Super Smash Bros. Ultimate tournament in June 2018 and finished in the top four. For the remainder of 2018, Mang0 failed to win a tournament but was able to finish in the top three of five tournaments, including Shine 2018, The Big House 8, and Smash Summit 7. In May 2019, Mang0 won Get On My Level 2019, ending his 19-event, and nearly two-year, streak without winning a tournament. He went on to win his second Melee major of the year in October after defeating Zain in The Big House 9 grand finals. Mang0 started 2020 with a third-place finish at GENESIS 7. In July 2020, he finished in second place at the Ludwig Ahgren Championship Series 2 after falling to Zain in the grand finals. In November, Mang0 was the runner-up at Smash Summit 10. Mang0 finished 2020 with a win at the Ludwig Ahgren Championship Series 3 after defeating iBDW in the finals.

On June 23, 2025, Cloud9 released Mang0 after his involvement in a sexual harassment incident during Ludwig Ahgren's Beerio Kart World Cup event on June 21.

=== Rocket League ===
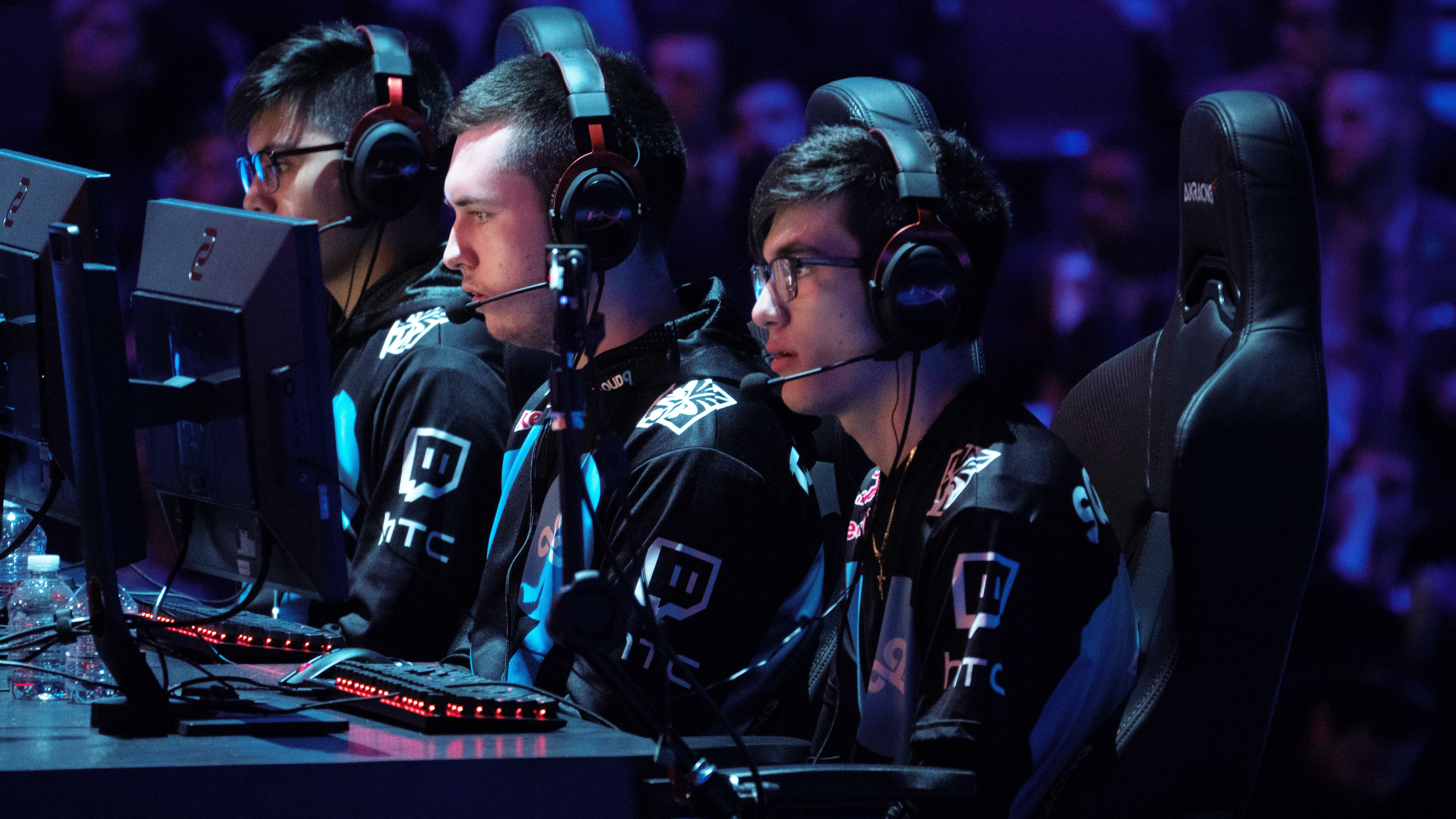
SquishyMuffinz, Gimmick, and Torment in their game against Dignitas to win RLCS Season 6

Cloud9 created their Rocket League division in July 2017 after acquiring DreamHack Atlanta champions team The Muffin Men. With a roster consisting of players Kyle "Torment" Storer, Mariano "SquishyMuffinz" Arruda, and Jesus "Gimmick" Parra, the team began play in the North America Rocket League Championship Series (RLCS) Season 4. After winning the North America playoffs, the team qualified for the RLCS World Championship tournament, where they were eventually eliminated by Scottish team Method in the lower bracket finals. Cloud9 made it to the RLCS Season 5 World Championship tournament but were eliminated by eventual champions Team Dignitas.

In Season 6, Cloud9 qualified for their third consecutive RLCS World Championship tournament. The team lost their first match of the tournament to We Dem Girlz, dropping them to the lower bracket of the tournament. Cloud9 won five consecutive elimination matches in the lower bracket and advanced to the Grand Finals, where they faced undefeated European team Team Dignitas on November 11, 2018. Cloud9 took down the defending champions by a series score of 4–1, marking the first time that a North American team had won the RLCS World Championship since Season 1.

Cloud9 followed up their Season 6 run with a semifinals loss in the Season 7 RLCS World Championship. Between seasons, Cloud signed former NRG Esports player Jayson "Fireburner" Nunez as the team's coach. Cloud9 finished North America RLCS Season 8 in seventh place, which put them at risk of being relegated to the Rocket League Rival Series, a lower division for the RLCS. The team made it through the promotion playoffs to avoid relegation and participate in North America RLCS Season 9, but they did not perform well. On June 10, 2020, Cloud9 would disband their Rocket League division and wouldn't come back until April 18, 2024, where they would acquire a roster consisting of Hunter "LionBlaze" Woitas, Kadin "Zineel" Zineelabidine and Oliver "percy." Ortiz. Cloud9's return to Rocket League in 2024 was financed, at least partly, by the funds they were given as members of the Esports World Cup Foundation Club Support Program, with the Esports World Cup Foundation itself backed by Saudi Arabia's Public Investment Fund. However three months later, on July 5, 2024, they announced they were dropping the team after a series of disappointing results.

=== Dota 2 ===
At The International 2024 in Copenhagen, Cloud9 qualified via the Western Europe regional qualifiers and dominated Group B with a 5–1 record to secure an upper‑bracket berth. After sweeping 1win 2–0 in the seeding decider, they defeated Aurora 2–0 in their upper‑bracket quarterfinal before falling 0–2 to Team Liquid. Cloud9 were then eliminated in fifth–sixth place following a 0–2 loss to Team Falcons, earning roughly US$88,000 in prize money.

=== Vainglory ===
On September 1, 2016, Cloud9 acquired Nemesis Hydra from Team Nemesis, getting their feet into the mobile esports scene. Nemesis Hydra had been one of the first competitive teams of Vainglory, having first appeared in March 2015. In their short year and a half of existence, Hydra had made it to the third tournament day, at least semi-finals, in each live championship. While never winning a championship, they completed a 14-game win streak in Split One of the 2016 Summer Season tournament "Evil 8."

In the Vainglory Summer Live Championships, under the blue and white of Cloud9, the team beat Phoenix Reborn in the first round, falling to Team SoloMid in the second round, and Phoenix Reign in the loser's bracket, missing their first day three of live finals in their history. Cloud9 would not qualify for the 2016 Vainglory World Championship. The team overcame Team SoloMid in the semifinals of the First Vainglory Unified Championship in London and were crowned winners after taking down Gankstars in Finals. In the 2017 Summer Unified Championships in Los Angeles they would once again be crowned Unified Champions, defeating Immortals in the final. At the 2017 World Championship, Cloud9 would make it all the way to the semifinal, before losing to Tribe Gaming, the former roster of Immortals.

On February 5, 2018, Cloud9 disbanded their Vainglory division.

=== Fortnite ===
Cloud9 first entered Fortnite competitively in 2018, and formally re-entered the circuit in the summer of 2019. The team is currently managed by Krissi Waters.

Awards and achievements
Preceded by Team SoloMid	North American League of Legends Championship Series winner Summer 2013–Spring 2014	Succeeded by Team SoloMid
Preceded by PGL Major Kraków 2017; Gambit Esports	ELEAGUE Major: Boston 2018 winner 2018	Succeeded by FACEIT Major: London 2018 (Astralis)
New award	2018 Overwatch League Grand Finals winner 2018	Succeeded by San Francisco Shock (NRG Esports)
