= Kolento =

Ukrainian esports player

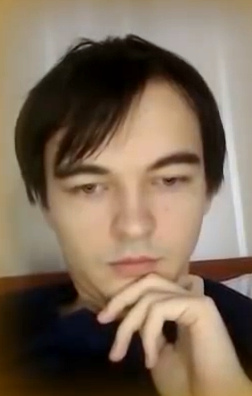
- Malsh in 2016

Personal information
- Name: Alexandr Malsh
- Nationality: Ukrainian

Current team
- Team: Cloud9
- Game: Hearthstone

Team history
- 2014–present: Cloud9

Alexandr Malsh, also known by his username Kolento, is a Ukrainian Hearthstone player who streams on Twitch. He is widely regarded as among the top Hearthstone players. Malsh is currently signed with Cloud9. Kolento formerly played World of Tanks competitively, before turning to Hearthstone.. Now he plays civilization 6.
