= Scarlett (gamer) =

Canadian professional esports player

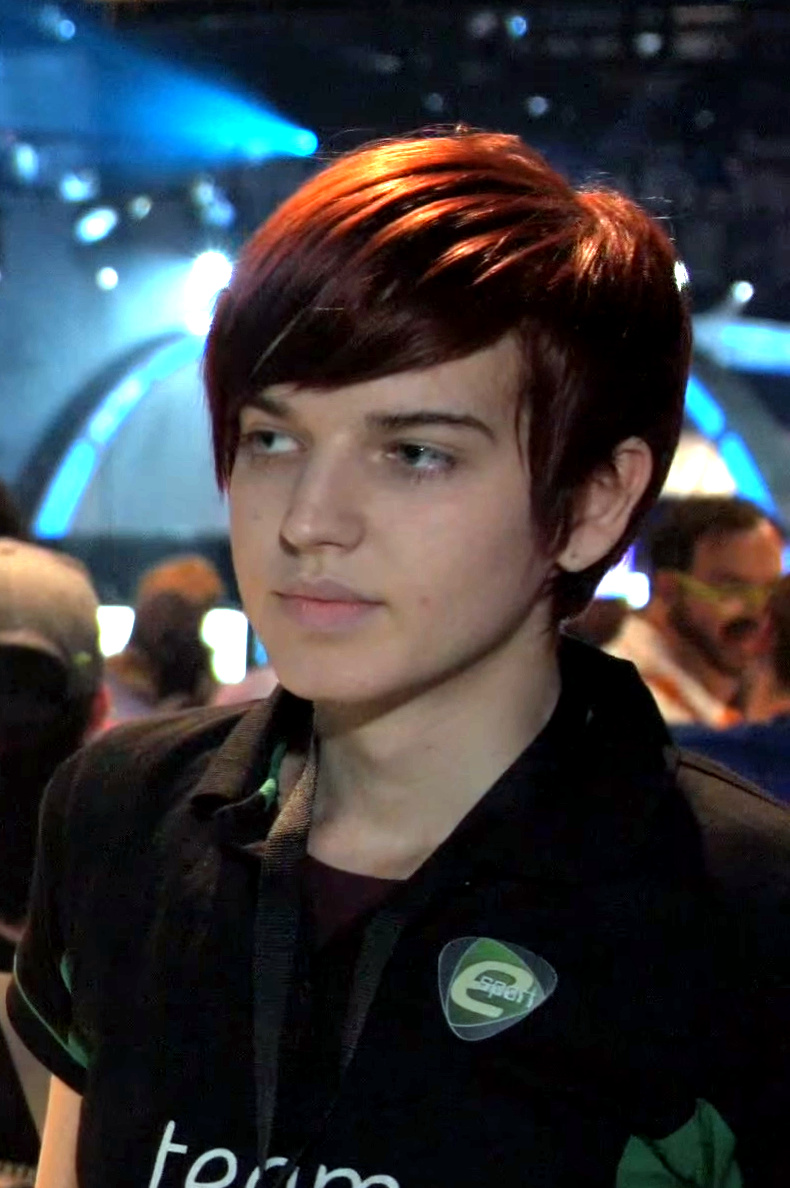
- Hostyn at BlizzCon 2014

Personal information
- Name: Sasha Hostyn
- Nicknames: The Queen of Blades; Korean Kryptonite
- Born: December 1993 (age 32); Kingston, Ontario, Canada

Career information
- Games: StarCraft; StarCraft II; Dota 2
- Playing career: 2011–present

Sasha Hostyn (born December 1993), also known by her username Scarlett, is a Canadian professional video game player. She is most well known for playing StarCraft II, and is the first woman to win a major StarCraft II tournament. She has also played Dota 2.

== Personal life ==
Hostyn grew up in Kingston, Ontario, and played games as a hobby during school and began to enter tournaments in 2011, leading to her career as a professional player. Hostyn is a transgender woman, and has said that her gender identity has "absolutely no relevance" to how she plays and that she has "always tried to make it a complete non-issue".

== Career ==
=== StarCraft II ===
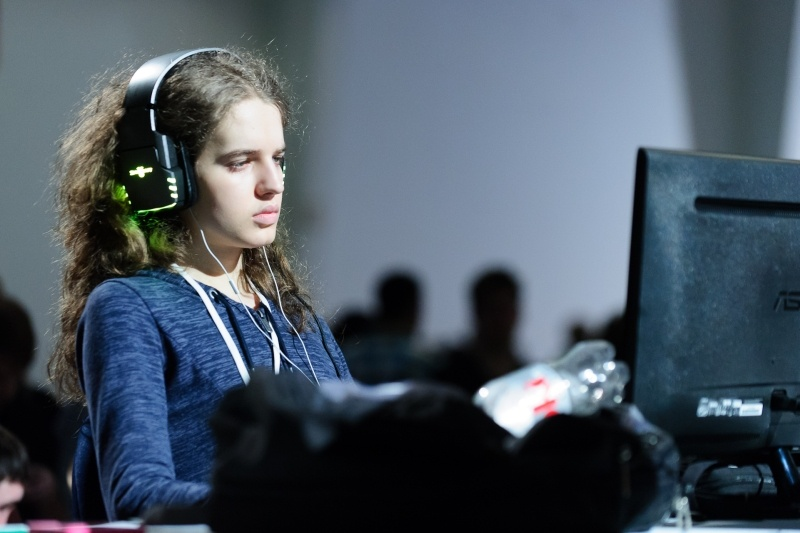
Hostyn at the North American Star League Season 3 in 2012

Hostyn became prominent in the StarCraft II scene in 2012 when she beat a number of highly ranked professionals at an event in Las Vegas. In 2013, she climbed the global StarCraft II rankings to rank 21 and placed second at NorthCon. By mid-2014, Hostyn had taken first place in seven tournaments, making her the second highest-paid professional female gamer at the time. By 2014, Hostyn had won over $110,000.

During her time playing StarCraft II, Hostyn has been called "the queen of StarCraft II", "Korean Kryptonite", and "The Queen of Blades". The New Yorker called her "the most accomplished woman in e-sports". She was the only Red Bull Battle Grounds 2014 finalist from a country other than South Korea. In 2014, Polygon named her one of 2014's 50 admirable gaming people, describing her as "one of the few women succeeding at the top level of the StarCraft II pro scene".

=== Dota 2 ===
Having lost some of her "competitive drive" for StarCraft II, Hostyn switched to playing Dota 2 in February 2015, explaining "If I can be good at both it’ll be something nobody has really done before."

=== Return to StarCraft II ===
As of June 2015, Hostyn has returned to StarCraft II, joining the Dead Pixels team and will compete in Korean leagues.

On August 17, 2016, Scarlett joined Team Expert.

In February 2018, Scarlett won the Intel Extreme Masters tournament, held in the leadup to the 2018 Winter Olympics in Pyeongchang, becoming the first woman to win a major StarCraft II tournament. Following this, in November 2018 Scarlett joined Newbee.

In February 2021, she joined the newly formed Shopify Rebellion.

== Awards ==
Scarlett was entered in the Guinness Book of Records as "highest career earnings for a female competitive video game player" on October 5, 2016.
