= College esports in the United States =

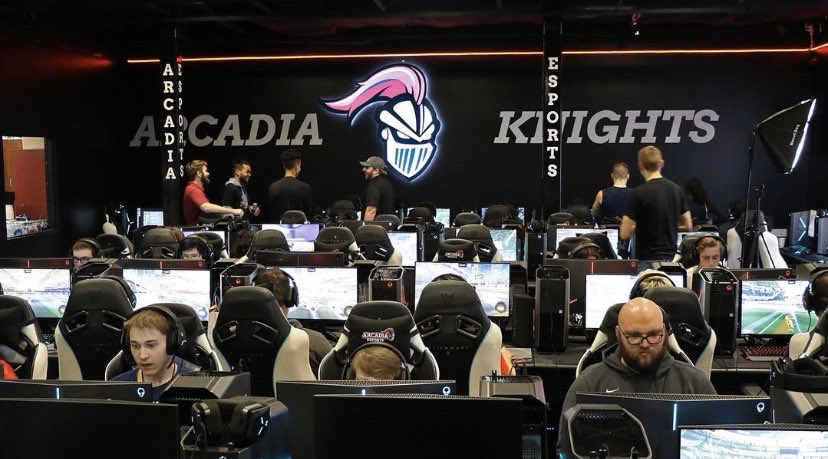
An esports arena at an American university

College esports in the United States is played by teams of amateur student-athletes at American universities and colleges. In the late 2000s, schools began forming esports clubs to play video games in self-organized collegiate tournaments. The first officially recognized varsity esports program was created at Robert Morris University Illinois in 2014.

While there are thousands of schools that participate in collegiate esports competitions, in 2018, there were at least 73 college varsity esports programs, and by 2019 over 130 college varsity programs. College esports is often viewed as a starting path for gamers that aspire to go professional.

The collegiate esports space includes tournaments that are geared specifically towards certain game titles. This includes Riot Games' collegiate League of Legends and VALORANT competitions. Broader intercollegiate programs such as the Esports Collegiate Conference and the National Association of Collegiate Esports (NACE) also support competition among participating institutions. The participation from each school is supported through varsity and club teams.

== Riot Games Collegiate League of Legends ==
In 2016, the North American Collegiate Championship (NACC) became the University League of Legends (uLoL) Campus Series, run by CSL, after IvyLoL and NACL stopped functioning and many of their staff were hired as Riot Games employees to orchestrate their collegiate activities. In the Fall of 2017, Riot Games announced that it would rebrand again as College League of Legends and switch official partners from CSL to Battlefy. In May 2019, Riot Games announced the formation of the Riot Scholastic Association of America (RSAA) as the governing body for collegiate and high school esports for League of Legends.

== Riot Games Collegiate Valorant ==
In 2021, Red Bull in collaboration with Riot Games introduced the Campus Clutch, a tournament consisting of university teams from 50 countries. This was Riot's first official tournament exclusively for collegiate programs, an open competition that featured regional qualifiers, national finals and an international championship in Madrid.

In 2022, Riot Games would announce the commencement of the first College Valorant Season (CVAL), an official collegiate competition that is ran annually for teams in the United States and Canada. This new structure of collegiate competition in Valorant features regional tournaments across North, South, East and West regions in a registration open for all institutions. Teams were set to participate in a format that included regional group stages and playoff brackets, with the strongest competing in the final championship event. The tournaments were held throughout the academic school year during fall, winter and spring. In 2023, Riot Games entered a 3 year partnership with GGTech, an international esports brand based in Spain that manages and organizes large scale esports tournaments and collegiate esports programs.

== Esports Collegiate Conference ==
The Esports Collegiate Conference was created on June 10, 2020, by member institutions of the Mid-American Conference, to facilitate esports competitions.

The organization was created to give college esports teams a more organized way to compete against one another through scheduled matches and championship tournaments. ESC runs separately from the Mid-American Conference (MAC) despite having identical founding members in the athletic conference.

The conference originally included 12 universities: the University of Akron, Ball State University, Bowling Green State University, the University at Buffalo, Central Michigan University, Eastern Michigan University, Kent State University, Miami University, Northern Illinois University, Ohio University, University of Toledo, and Western Michigan University. Its first season was planned for the 2020–21 academic year, with competitions taking place during the fall and spring semesters and the games being League of Legends and Overwatch.

In October 2020, Northeastern University became the first university outside of the original founding members to join the conference, beginning competition in the spring 2021 season.

ESC would later expand its competitions to include games such as Rocket League and VALORANT. During the 2021–22 academic year, the conference partnered with esports platform eFuse to produce and broadcast its tournaments. The partnership planned to organize 280 matches involving 14 member teams throughout the academic season.

== National Association of Collegiate Esports ==
The National Association of Collegiate Esports, otherwise known as NACE or NAC Esports, was founded in 2016. As of 2021, its membership includes over 170 colligate organizations .NACE works with institutions involved in esports, aiding them in establishing and supporting their esports programs. This includes setting eligibility requirements for student competitors and offering resources for schools in developing their respective teams. The organization offers competition in Rocket League, League of Legends, Overwatch, and other titles.

In February 2021, NACE partnered with the Atlantic East Conference to provide more opportunities for collegiate esports competition. The partnership helped establish competitive standards for schools willing to compete.

== List of colleges and universities with esports teams ==
Colleges and universities with esports teams
School	Location
Albion College	Michigan
Albright College	Pennsylvania
Anderson University (IN)	Indiana
Aquinas College	Michigan
Arcadia University	Pennsylvania
Ashland University	Ohio
Averett University	Virginia
Ball State University	Indiana
Barry University	Florida
Barton Community College	Kansas
Bellevue University	Nebraska
Bemidji State University	Minnesota
Benedictine University at Mesa	Arizona
Bethel College	Indiana
Boise State University	Idaho
Bowling Green State University	Ohio
Brescia University	Kentucky
Bryant & Stratton College	Virginia
California State University, East Bay	California
California State University, Dominguez Hills	California
Campbellsville University	Kentucky
Central Methodist University	Missouri
Central Michigan University	Michigan
Centralia College	Washington
Centre College	Kentucky
Cincinnati Christian University	Ohio
Coker College	South Carolina
College of St. Joseph	Vermont
Colorado College	Colorado
Columbia College	Missouri
Columbia College	South Carolina
Concordia University (Nebraska)	Nebraska
Concordia University (Texas)	Texas
Cottey College	Missouri
Crowder College	Missouri
Culver-Stockton College	Missouri
Cumberland University	Tennessee
Daemen College	New York
Davenport University	Michigan
Defiance College	Ohio
DeSales University	Pennsylvania
Dickinson State University	North Dakota
DigiPen Institute of Technology	Washington
Eastern Michigan University	Michigan
ECPI University	Virginia
Embry Riddle Aeronautical University	Arizona
Endicott College	Massachusetts
Fairfield University	Connecticut
Ferris State University	Michigan
Full Sail University	Florida
Fontbonne University	Missouri
Florida Southern College	Florida
Florida State University	Florida
George Fox University	Oregon
George Mason University	Virginia
Georgia Southern University	Georgia
Georgia State University	Georgia
Grand Valley State University	Michigan
Grand View University	Iowa
Harrisburg University	Pennsylvania
Hawkeye Community College	Iowa
Henderson State University	Arkansas
Illinois College	Illinois
Illinois Wesleyan University	Illinois
Immaculata University	Pennsylvania
Indiana Institute of Technology	Indiana
Indiana Wesleyan University	Indiana
Juniata College	Pennsylvania
Kansas Wesleyan University	Kansas
Kean University	New Jersey
Kent State University	Ohio
Kettering University	Michigan
King University	Tennessee
King's College	Pennsylvania
Kutztown University of Pennsylvania	Pennsylvania
Lackawanna College	Pennsylvania
Lambton College	Ontario
Lawrence Technological University	Michigan
Lebanon Valley College	Pennsylvania
Lees-McRae College	North Carolina
Lindenwood University	Missouri
Lourdes University	Ohio
Lycoming College	Pennsylvania
Marietta College	Ohio
Maryville University	Missouri
Marywood University	Pennsylvania
McPherson College	Kansas
McMurry University	Texas
Menlo College	California
Messiah University	Pennsylvania
Miami University	Ohio
Michigan Technological University	Michigan
Michigan State University	Michigan
Midland University	Nebraska
Midway University	Kentucky
Minnesota State University, Mankato	Minnesota
Missouri Baptist University	Missouri
Missouri Valley College	Missouri
Monroe College	New York
Mount Aloysius College	Pennsylvania
Morningside College	Iowa
Neumann University	Pennsylvania
New Jersey Institute of Technology	New Jersey
New Mexico Institute of Mining and Technology	New Mexico
New Mexico State University	New Mexico
Niagara University	New York
University of North Alabama	Alabama
Northeastern University	Massachusetts
Northern Essex Community College	Massachusetts
Northern Virginia Community College	Virginia
Northwest Christian University	Oregon
Northwest State Community College	Ohio
Northwood University	Michigan
Norwich University	Vermont
Oakland University	Michigan
Ohio University	Ohio
Ohio Northern University	Ohio
Oklahoma City University	Oklahoma
Oregon Institute of Technology	Oregon
Oregon State University	Oregon
Pennsylvania College of Art & Design	Pennsylvania
Pennsylvania College of Technology	Pennsylvania
Pennsylvania State University	Pennsylvania
Point Park University	Pennsylvania
Pratt Community College	Kansas
Principia College	Illinois
Randolph-Macon College	Virginia
Robert Morris University Illinois	Illinois
Robert Morris University	Pennsylvania
Rochester Institute of Technology	New York
Rowan University	New Jersey
Rutgers University	New Jersey
Sacred Heart University	Connecticut
Schreiner University	Texas
Seton Hill University	Pennsylvania
Shenandoah University	Virginia
Simpson College	Iowa
St. Louis College of Pharmacy	Missouri
South Dakota School of Mines & Technology	South Dakota
Southern Nazarene University	Oklahoma
Southern Virginia University	Virginia
Southwestern College	Kansas
Southwest Baptist University	Missouri
St. Ambrose University	Iowa
St. Clair College	Ontario
St. Cloud State University	Minnesota
St. Francis University	Pennsylvania
St. John's University (New York City)	New York
St. Mary's University	Texas
St. Thomas Aquinas College	New York
St. Thomas University	Florida
Stephens College	Missouri
Stockton University	New Jersey
Stevenson University	Maryland
Syracuse University	New York
SUNY Canton	New York
Sussex County Community College	New Jersey
Temple University	Pennsylvania
Tennessee Technological University	Tennessee
Texas A&M University-San Antonio	Texas
Texas Wesleyan University	Texas
Thomas College	Maine
Tiffin University	Ohio
Trine University	Indiana
United States Air Force Academy	Colorado
University of Alaska, Anchorage	Alaska
University at Albany	New York
University of Akron	Ohio
University of Arizona	Arizona
University at Buffalo	New York
University of California-Berkeley	California
University of California-Irvine	California
University of Central Oklahoma	Oklahoma
University of Colorado Boulder	Colorado
University of Delaware	Delaware
University of Illinois, Urbana-Champaign	Illinois
University of Jamestown	North Dakota
University of Kentucky	Kentucky
University of Louisville	Kentucky
University of Maryland, Baltimore County	Maryland
University of Missouri	Missouri
University of Montana	Montana
University of New Haven	Connecticut
University of New Mexico	New Mexico
University of North Dakota	North Dakota
University of North Texas	Texas
University of Oregon	Oregon
University of Oklahoma	Oklahoma
University of Pennsylvania	Pennsylvania
University of Pikeville	Kentucky
University of Providence	Montana
University of Redlands	California
University of Southern California	California
University of South Carolina-Sumter	South Carolina
University of St. Thomas (Texas)	Texas
University of Tennessee at Chattanooga	Tennessee
University of Texas at Dallas	Texas
University of Utah	Utah
University of Washington	Washington
University of Wisconsin-River Falls	Wisconsin
University of Wisconsin-Stevens Point	Wisconsin
Utah Tech University	Utah
Valparaiso University	Indiana
Wake Forest University	North Carolina
Warner Pacific University	Oregon
Wartburg College	Iowa
Waynesburg University	Pennsylvania
West Virginia University	West Virginia
West Virginia University Institute of Technology	West Virginia
West Virginia Wesleyan College	West Virginia
Western Kentucky University	Kentucky
Wichita State University	Kansas
Wilkes University	Pennsylvania
Wilson College	Pennsylvania
William & Mary	Virginia
Winthrop University	South Carolina
Yavapai College	Arizona
York County Community College	Maine
Dakota State University	South Dakota
