= Shopify Rebellion =

Canadian esports team

- Games: Apex Legends; Dota 2; Guilty Gear Strive; Halo Infinite; League of Legends; Rainbow Six Siege; Rocket League; Super Smash Bros.; StarCraft II; Street Fighter; Valorant
- Founded: February 2021
- Based in: Toronto, Canada
- Owners: Tobias Lütke; Charles White Jr.; Ludwig Ahgren
- Parent group: Shopify
- Website: Official website

Shopify Rebellion is a Canadian esports organization founded in February 2021 by e-commerce company Shopify, with active rosters in Apex Legends, Dota 2, Guilty Gear Strive, Halo Infinite, League of Legends, Rainbow Six Siege, Rocket League, Super Smash Bros., StarCraft II, Street Fighter, and Valorant. The team is co-owned by Shopify and internet personalities Charles "MoistCr1tikal" White Jr. and Ludwig Ahgren.

== History ==
On February 19, 2021, Shopify CEO Tobias Lütke announced the formation of Shopify Rebellion, beginning with the organization's StarCraft II division and recruited players such as 2016 WCS champion Byun "ByuN" Hyun-woo and Sasha "Scarlett" Hostyn. The organization expanded into their second esports title in April 2021, buying out the contracts of Kansas City Pioneers' Rocket League division. Shopify Rebellion entered Valorant esports in June 2021, signing a roster to compete in the Valorant Champions Tour Game Changers series. The organization established two more divisions in 2022, creating a Halo Infinite division in January and a Dota 2 division in December.

In August 2023, Shopify Rebellion signed NuckleDu for the video game Street Fighter. In September 2023, the organization entered League of Legends esports by acquiring TSM's League of Legends Championship Series (LCS) franchise slot. On the same day as its LCS purchase, Shopify Rebellion formed a joint-venture Valorant partnership with Moist Esports, known as Moist x Shopify (MxS).

The organization's Valorant Game Changers roster won the 2023 Game Changers Championship, defeating Team Liquid Brazil 3–2 in the final. They once again won the championship in 2024, defeating MIBR GC 3–0 in the final to become the first two-time champions.

On January 17, 2025, Moist Esports co-owners Charles White Jr., who goes by the name MoistCr1tikal, and Ludwig Ahgren were announced as co-owners of Shopify Rebellion. As part of the deal, Moist would merge with Shopify Rebellion, with all former Moist Esports teams transitioning to the new name.

On January 22, 2025, Shopify's Valorant Game Changers roster, now called Shopify Rebellion Gold, became the first Game Changers team to qualify for Valorant Challengers, the second tier of the game's esports competition.

On October 26, 2025, Shopify's Halo roster, became the final Halo Infinite world champions defeating OpTic Gaming 4-1 in the Grand Final.

== Rosters ==
Shopify Rebellion rosters

Apex Legends
Handle	Name	Nationality
Zap	Bangs, Nelson	United States
Xynew	Geissler, Brody	United States
Sauceror	Li, Jason	United States

Halo Infinite
Handle	Name	Nationality
Cykul	Sipes, Preston	United States
Royal2	Fiorante, Mathew	Canada
Frosty	Bergstrom, Bradley	United States
ItzTheLastShot	Gowan, Wyatt	United States

League of Legends
Handle	Name	Nationality
Contractz	Garcia, Juan	United States
Zinie	Baek-jin, Yoo (유백진)	South Korea
Bvoy	Ju Yeong-hoon	South Korea
Fudge	Allami, Ibrahim	Australia
Zeyzal	Stidam, Tristan	United States

Rainbow Six Siege
Handle	Name	Nationality
Ambi	Turk, Jaylen	United States
Spoit	Löfstedt, William	Sweden
Surf	Medina, Damian	United States
Bae94	Dowling, Jacob	United States
Spiker	Lukens, Brady	United States

Rocket League
Handle	Name	Nationality
Atomic	Franceschi, Massimo	United States
Daniel	Piecenski, Daniel	United States
Firstkiller	Corral, Jason	United States

StarCraft II
Handle	Name	Nationality
ByuN	Byun Hyun-woo	South Korea
Harstem	de Koning, Kevin	Netherlands
Lambo	Brosig, Julian	Germany
Scarlett	Hostyn, Sasha	Canada

Street Fighter
Handle	Name	Nationality
JAK	Edwards, David	United States
NuckleDu	Dang, Du	United States

Super Smash Bros. Melee
Handle	Name	Nationality
moky	Pratt, Kurtis	Canada
Zain	Naghmi, Zain	United States
Joshman	Lyras, Joshua	Australia

Super Smash Bros. Ultimate
Handle	Name	Nationality
Light	Ramirez, Paris	United States
Kola	Aideyan, Kolawole	United States

Valorant
Handle	Name	Nationality
Zander	Dituri, Alexander	Canada
Kyu	Hrustemovic, Mirel Braco	Canada
NiSMO	Tayar, Marc-Andre	Canada
Smoke	Unknown, Unknown	United States
Boni	Bonifacio, Mark	United States

Valorant Game Changers
Handle	Name	Nationality
dodonut	Chaisrakeo, Karnthida	Thailand
vanitas	Campione, Lucien	Italy
glowstick	Lambert, Franklin	United States
alexis	Guarrasi, Alexis	United States
Noia	Tierce, Nicole	Denmark

Legend:
- (I) Inactive
- (S) Suspended
- (L) On loan
- (2W) Two-way player
- Substitute
- (injured) Injury / Illness
