= Kaydop =

French esports player

Alexandre Courant, also known as Kaydop, is a French professional Rocket League player born on May 22, 1998, and currently 3-time RLCS world champion.
