= MoistCr1tikal =

American YouTuber and streamer (born 1994)

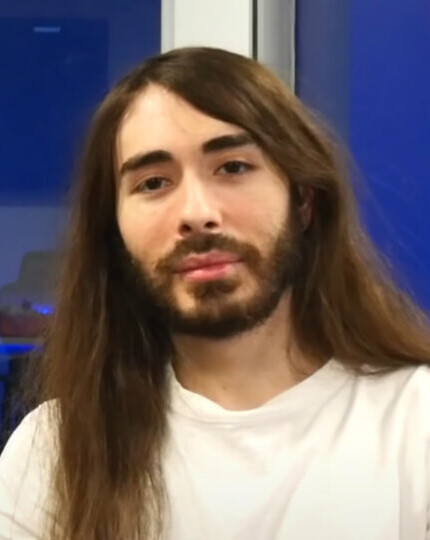
- White in 2022
- Born: Charles Christopher White Jr. August 2, 1994 (age 32); Tampa, Florida, U.S.
- Other names: Cr1TiKaL; penguinz0
- Education: University of Tampa (BS)
- Occupations: YouTuber; live streamer; podcaster; musician; actor; comic book writer; Esports manager
- Organization(s): Moist Esports; Shopify Rebellion

Twitch information
- Channel: moistcr1tikal
- Years active: 2018–2023; 2024–present
- Genres: Gaming; chatting; cooking; reaction
- Followers: 5.9 million

YouTube information
- Channel: penguinz0
- Years active: 2006–present
- Genres: Gaming; commentary; vlog; podcasts; music; reviews
- Subscribers: 18.3 million
- Views: 14.3 billion
- Last updated: November 9, 2026
- Website: moistglobal.com

Charles Christopher White Jr. (born August 2, 1994), better known as MoistCr1tikal, (Note: Sometimes stylized as MoistCr1TiKaL, pronounced "moist critical".) Cr1TiKaL, (Note: Pronounced "critical".) or penguinz0 (Note: Pronounced "penguin zee zero".) is an American YouTuber, online streamer, and actor. He is best known for his commentary videos and live streams covering internet culture and video games. His content is mostly characterized by his monotonous voice and deadpan comedic style. In addition, White was the co-founder and co-owner of the esports organization Moist Esports, is currently the co-owner of Shopify Rebellion, and is also a co-founder and member of the musical duo the Gentle Men.

As of November 2026, White's YouTube channel has over 18.3 million subscribers, while his Twitch channel has over 5.9 million followers.

== Early and personal life ==
Charles Christopher White Jr. was born on August 2, 1994, in Tampa, Florida. He attended Carrollwood Day School and was a member of the varsity basketball team. White attended the University of Tampa and graduated with a bachelor's degree in human sciences with a focus on exercise physiology.

== Internet career ==
=== 2006–2017: Early years and content evolution ===
White started making YouTube videos in 2006, when he most often uploaded videos discussing anime, as well as anime music videos and gaming music videos, to his old channels. He created his penguinz0 YouTube channel on May 7, 2007. During this time, he streamed live on Justin.tv from late 2009 to early 2010.

In 2013, White was cited by Tubefilter as panning YouTube's new comment system, which required a Google+ account to leave comments on videos. In early 2015, White began speaking about various topics, including internet drama. He drew attention from media outlets for his commentary videos, which were often of discourse about online platforms and considerably critical of YouTube's policies. In December 2016, White began co-hosting The Official Podcast with fellow Internet personalities Jackson Clarke, Andrew Wagenheim, and Kaya Orsan.

Media outlets sparsely referred to White's gameplay videos; his 2015 video on Ark: Survival Evolved was referenced by The Daily Star. The Daily Dot wrote that White is known for his "sardonic commentary." In February 2016, The Guardian included his video reaction to the Fine Brothers' React World controversy in their coverage of the situation. Kotaku referred to White's 2017 video demonstrating character customization in Mass Effect: Andromeda.

=== 2018–present: Twitch livestreaming and continued growth ===
White has continued to make content discussing events on online platforms and their communities. In January 2018, White addressed YouTube, which removed his video discussing Logan Paul's suicide forest controversy. By March 2018, White's YouTube channel had two million subscribers. In May, White's video featuring a pit of 5,400 balls, which he made for his husky Tetra, went viral; the Press Association interviewed him about the video and media outlets reported it. In 2018, White began livestreaming on Twitch. In March 2020; due to COVID-19 lockdown measures, he co-hosted an online Super Smash Bros. Ultimate tournament on his Twitch channel with fellow YouTuber Alpharad.

In late 2020, White's popularity grew due to his Twitch streams about chess and Among Us (during its 2020 popularity spike) with popular streamers such as Sykkuno, Pokimane, Nigahiga, Valkyrae, Trainwreckstv, and Disguised Toast. In June, White participated in the first PogChamps chess tournament, which Chess.com hosted. He won "one of the more anticipated games" in the tournament, beating fellow Twitch streamer xQc in six moves. According to Dot Esports, the game was one of the five "biggest moments in streaming from 2020" and the clip of White's victory became one of the most-viewed in Twitch history, gaining over 1.9 million views by December 24, 2020. White won the tournament's consolation bracket. In late October, White participated in U.S. Representative Alexandria Ocasio-Cortez's Among Us live streams.

In November, White signed a contract with BroadbandTV Corp (BBTV) to become a content partner. Also in November, White spoke in a YouTube video about an increase in Twitch's DMCA crackdowns. In December, White participated in a "Pokémon Week" event on Twitch in which several creators hosted streams in which they opened boxes of Pokémon cards. In January 2021, White began hosting a game show titled Hivemind with fellow streamer Ludwig Ahgren on Twitch.

On February 22, 2021, former YouTuber MaximilianMus deleted his YouTube channel after White labeled him "the worst YouTuber" in one of his videos. White was critical of Mus for maliciously raiding Twitch channels and claimed that Mus' audience had shared child pornography via Discord servers and his subreddit. In May of that year, Mus restored his channel and accused White of slander. In October 2021, White participated in a Nickelodeon All-Star Brawl charity tournament hosted by Alpharad and Coney of Panda Global.

On July 31, 2024, White announced that he would be stepping away from The Official Podcast and The Red Thread "to scale back his time spent on the internet," amid controversy regarding Orsan and arguments with streamer Sneako. On September 21, he was called to testify on the sixth day of the trial of Mitchell v. Jobst, a defamation lawsuit by Billy Mitchell against Karl Jobst for video essays covering allegations of Mitchell cheating his world records in Donkey Kong (1981) and Pac-Man (1980), of which White also voiced his belief in. White's January 2024 video on Mitchell, "He's A Cheater" — in which White started by "giving an apology" to Mitchell by farting into his microphone before reiterating certainty that Mitchell cheated — was presented into evidence to illustrate a "grapevine effect" of Jobst's videos on other YouTubers and their audience.

In February 2025, White released a video announcing his apparent retirement and handing the responsibility for his channel to singer T-Pain, with whom he had previously collaborated. After T-Pain stood in for him in a single video, White clarified that his retirement was merely a comedic act. On June 10, 2025, White created an additional channel dedicated exclusively to gaming playthroughs and livestreams, MoistCr1TiKaL Gaming. On October 20, 2025, White released a video paying tribute to his friend and chess teacher, Daniel Naroditsky, who had died the previous day.

== Other ventures ==
In 2019, White and Troy McKubre of the band Solstate started a musical duo named the Gentle Men. The duo started producing music with a string of singles released that same year. The Gentle Men released their debut album, The Evolution of Tears, in 2021, and a self-titled EP in 2023.

In 2019, White and his childhood friend Matt Philips co-founded a multi-channel network called Double Helix Media, which would soon after merge with the management team of creator Gibi ASMR to form Human Media Group. Human Media Group reportedly had signed 150 creators in April 2022. Human Media Group would then merge with the management team of Tyler "JimmyHere" Collins in August 2022 to form Mana Talent Agency, which he co-owns alongside JimmyHere, Wendigoon, and various other creators.

In July 2021, White announced the launch of a graphic novel series titled GODSLAP, which he wrote with author Stephanie Phillips and artist Ricardo Jaime and was published by Meatier Productions. That same year, White expressed interest in the expansion of the series beyond comics and hinted at an animated adaptation that was being produced. On September 3, 2026, an animated film based on GODSLAP was announced. It will be produced by Lyrical Animation.

In August 2021, White announced a new esports organization named Moist Esports. Super Smash Bros. Ultimate player Kolawole "Kola" Aideyan became the first player to join, and he won a tournament under the name "Moist Kola." In January 2025, White and Moist co-owner Ludwig Ahgren would become co-owners in Shopify Rebellion, with all Moist Esports rosters at the time following them.

On August 8, 2022, gaming organization One True King, along with White, announced the founding of technology company Starforge Systems, which focuses on building computers. The company was quickly met with backlash due to the high prices of their products, and shortly thereafter they decreased their prices by $100.

== Filmography ==
=== Films ===
Year	Title	Director	Writer	Producer	Notes	Ref.
2028	Godslap †	No	Yes	Yes	Production	

==== Acting ====
Year	Title	Role	Notes	Ref.
2014	The Hunger Games: Mockingjay – Part 1	District 8 hospital helper	Uncredited extra	
2021	Last of the Grads	Officer Greg		

=== Web ===
Year	Title	Role	Notes	Ref.
2016	Butter Lover	Cashier, customer		
2020–2022	HealthyGamerGG	Himself	2 episodes	
2020	Killer Bean	Kessler	Voice; web series; episode 1	
2022	MeatCanyon	Himself	Episode: "YouTuber Merch"	
2023–present	Skill Check	Hugh Fructose, Himself	Custom Dungeons & Dragons Show	
2023	The Dark, Sad Life of Boogie2988	Himself	Documentary; Archive footage	
2024	MrBeast	Himself	Episode: "50 YouTubers Fight for $1,000,000"	
2026	The Sick Mind of EDP445	Himself	Documentary	

=== Anime ===
Year	Title	Role	Notes	Ref.
2022	Tribe Nine	Hannya Tribe member	Funimation dub	
2024	Lovely Complex	Cane Osugi (voice)	Discotek dub	
2026	Baki-Dou	Police Officer (voice)	Dubbing Brothers dub	

=== Podcasts ===
Year	Title	Role	Notes	Ref.
2016–2024	The Official Podcast	Himself (co-host)	Co-host alongside Kaya Orsan, Jackson Clarke, and Andrew Wagenheim; 513 episodes	
2018	Sardonicast	Himself	1 episode	
2020	Scuffed Podcast	Himself	6 episodes	
2020	WILDCAST	Himself	1 episode	
2020	Misfits Podcast	Himself	1 episode	
2021	Forehead Fables Podcast	Himself	1 episode	
2021	Chuckle Sandwich	Himself	1 episode	
2021–2022	SomeOrdinaryPodcast	Himself	3 episodes	
2022	Tiny Meat Gang Podcast	Himself	1 episode	
2022	Trash Taste	Himself	1 episode	
2023	Fear&	Himself	1 episode	
2023	The Nik Nocturnal Podcast	Himself	1 episode	
2023–2024	The Red Thread	Himself (co-host)	Co-host alongside Isaiah Nichols and Jackson Clarke; 28 episodes	
2024	Jynxzi Podcast	Himself	1 episode	
2024	Steve-O's Wild Ride!	Himself	1 episode	
2025	Wine About It	Himself	1 episode	

=== Video games ===
Year	Title	Role	Notes	Ref.
2014	Tropico 5	American tourists	Voice role	
2015	Lucius II: The Prophecy	Job Gilman	Voice role	
2015	Voidexpanse	Spaceship Robot	Voice role	
2016	Anima: Gate of Memories	Zero Mask	Voice role	
2016	Move or Die	Announcer	Voice role	
2018	Anima: Gate of Memories – The Nameless Chronicles	Zero Mask	Voice role	
2018	Lucius III	Ceefor Bonaparte	Voice role	
2018	Star Control: Origins	Aliens from Charlox	Voice role	
2020	Popup Dungeon	The Internet Troll	Voice role	
2024	World of Warships	Chuck Blast	Likeness and voice over	
2025	Dispatch	Sonar / Victor	Voice role	
2026	Mewgenics	Cats	Creature role	

== Discography ==
=== The Gentle Men ===
Studio albums

Title	Album details
The Evolution of Tears	Released: September 5, 2021; Label: Sounds of Liberty; Formats: Vinyl, digital download

EPs

Title	Album details
The Gentle Men	Released: October 27, 2023; Label: Sounds of Liberty; Formats: CD, digital download

Singles

Title	Year	Album/EP
"2019 Guy"	2019	The Evolution of Tears
"Obsession"	2020	The Evolution of Tears
"Real to Me"	2020	The Evolution of Tears
"Skynut"	2020	The Evolution of Tears
"2004 Breakup"	2020	The Evolution of Tears
"I Am Truth"	2020	The Evolution of Tears
"Your Boyfriend Doesn't Scare Me" (featuring Kmac2021)	2021	The Evolution of Tears
"Perfect Oblivion"	2021	The Evolution of Tears
"The First Immortal" (Interlude)	2021	The Evolution of Tears
"Here's to Us"	2021	The Evolution of Tears
"Filthy"	2023	Non-album single
"What's Next"	2023	The Gentle Men
"Enemy" (featuring Andy Cizek)	2023	The Gentle Men
"Let You Down"	2023	The Gentle Men
"Ghosts"	2023	The Gentle Men
"Opinions Are Weapons" (featuring Jared Dines)	2023	The Gentle Men
"Time Travel"	2026	Non-album single

=== Solo ===
Music videos

Year	Title	Artist(s)	Role	Ref.
2024	"lil' freak"	bbno$	Himself	

== Bibliography ==
=== Novels ===
- Swan, Genghis (2017). The Man Who Forgot How to Poop. Chris Metzner. CreateSpace. ISBN 978-1-9776-3973-8.

=== Comics ===
- GodSlap (2022–present)
- Plague Seeker (2023–present)

== Awards and nominations ==
Year	Ceremony	Category	Result	Ref.
2021	The Streamer Awards	Best Variety Streamer	Won	
2022	12th Streamy Awards	Best Variety Streamer	Nominated	
2023	13th Streamy Awards	Subject Award – Commentary	Won	
2025	The Game Awards	Content Creator of the Year	Won	

== See also ==
- List of YouTubers
- List of most-followed Twitch channels
