= 2027 Valorant Champions Tour =

7th season of esports tournament series

- League: Valorant Champions Tour
- Sport: Valorant
- Duration: January 14 – March 7 (Kickoff + Masters Seoul); April 29 – June 20 (Cup 1 + Masters Valencia); August 5 – October 10 (Cup 2 + Champions)
- Teams: 32 (partner teams; 8 per league); Multiple non-partnered teams

Masters Seoul

Masters Valencia

Champions Austin

VCT seasons
- ← 2026 2028 →

The 2027 Valorant Champions Tour will be the seventh season of the Valorant Champions Tour and the first of the second open qualifiers era. The Kickoff stage will start on January 14. The two Masters events will be held in Seoul, South Korea after Kickoff and Valencia, Spain after the first round of Cups. The season will culminate with the 2027 Valorant Champions tournament in Austin, Texas, United States from September 16 to October 10.

Open qualifiers for Kickoff began in early November 2026.

== Changes ==
=== Switch to open qualifiers ===
After the first year of implementing the franchising system, Riot Games received criticism for its unsuitability and for its creation of difficulties for non-partner teams (a.k.a "tier 2 teams"), as the path to going professional and qualifying for Masters/Champions was no longer open, requiring more time and financial resources. These teams also did not receive the same level of support as partner teams ("tier 1 teams") unless they won Ascension, facing the risk of having their talent poached and struggle to maintain both financial stability and competitive strength, problems that also exist in the current franchising system in League of Legends (LoL) esports. Although Riot Games never made an official statement, their subsequent actions seemed to implicitly acknowledge that the franchising system had suffered irreparable failures at tier 2, ultimately leading to the early termination of the franchising era in 2026, one year ahead of schedule, and to the unveiling of a new Valorant esports system, which will be applied from the start of the 2027 season.

On April 8, 2026, Riot Games unveiled a format overhaul for the Valorant Champions Tour starting from the 2027 season, retaining the three-split structure and returning to a regional open qualifier system from the VCT's first few years. Under the new format, both partner and non-partner teams will have to play through open qualifiers for Kickoff Events and Regional Cups, with these events serving as qualifiers for Masters and Champions. In addition, the four major leagues (VCT Americas, VCT CN, VCT EMEA, & VCT Pacific) would become territories, with each hosting their respective Kickoff and Cup events. The partnership system will also switch to a two-year cycle, retaining existing incentives in addition to placement to a later round of open qualifiers, with non-partner teams receiving financial support for sustainability.

=== Partner team changes ===
While the VCT will return to an open format, it retained a partnership system, where each of the four territories have partnered teams with no guest slots, except for VCT CN, which retains two guest slots. On 22 October 2026, Riot Games announced the 32 partner teams for the 2027 and 2028 VCT, with each territory having eight teams.

Region	Additions		Subtractions	
Region	Partnered	▲ Promoted	Departed	▼ Relegated
Americas	G2 Esports	—N/a	Cloud9; Evil Geniuses; Furia	—N/a
EMEA	None	—N/a	GiantX; Natus Vincere	—N/a
Pacific	Crazy Raccoon; GAM Esports	—N/a	DetonatioN FocusMe; DRX; Global Esports; Team Secret	—N/a
China	Weibo Gaming; Xi Lai Gaming		—N/a	

In VCT Americas, G2 Esports became the only new partner team after it competed as a guest from 2024 to 2026. Cloud9, Evil Geniuses, and Furia depart from the partnership system with EG announcing its dissolution on November 2026. VCT EMEA didn't have any new partners, with GiantX and Natus Vincere departing the system. VCT Pacific saw two new partner teams in Crazy Raccoon and GAM Esports. Detonation FocusMe, DRX, Global Esports, and Team Secret are no longer partners with GE leaving esports completely.

VCT CN also had two new partners in Xi Lai Gaming, who were a guest team since 2025, and Weibo Gaming. The five teams that competed in 2026 who aren't partners, Dragon Ranger Gaming, FunPlus Phoenix, Nova Esports, Titan Esports Club, and Wolves Esports competed for the two guest slots or visitor team slots in the Threshold tournament, which was won by Dragon Ranger Gaming and Nova Esports.

== Kickoff ==
The Kickoff tournaments will be held from January 14 to February 7 and will retain the triple-elimination format used in 2026. The tournaments will be held in São Paulo, Brazil (Americas); Berlin, Germany (EMEA); Bangkok, Thailand (Pacific); and Hangzhou (China).

== Cup 1 ==
The first round of Cups will be held from April 29 to May 3. This round of Cups will be held in Mexico City, Mexico (Americas); Warsaw, Poland (EMEA); Manila, Philippines (Pacific); and Wuhan (China).

== Cup 2 ==
The second round of Cups will be held from August 5 to 29. This round of Cups will be held in Rio de Janeiro, Brazil (Americas); Istanbul, Turkey (EMEA); Tokyo, Japan (Pacific); and Shanghai (China).
