= Valorant Masters Seoul 2027 =

Esports competition in South Korea

Tournament information
- Game: Valorant
- Location: Seoul, South Korea
- Date: 20 February–7 March
- Administrator: Riot Games
- Teams: 12

Valorant Masters Seoul 2027 is an upcoming global Valorant tournament organised by the game's developer, Riot Games, following the Kickoff stage of the 2027 Valorant Champions Tour (VCT). The tournament will be held in Seoul, South Korea, from 20 February to 7 March.

It will be the first Masters event to be held under the VCT's second open-qualifiers era, and South Korea's second hosting of a global Valorant competition after the 2024 Champions tournament. Teams will qualify based on their placements within their territory's Kickoff event.

== Host selection ==
Days before the 2026 Valorant Champions finals in Shanghai, China, Riot Games announced on 15 October 2026 the locations for major tournaments of the 2027 Valorant Champions Tour, with Seoul being confirmed as the host city for the first Masters event of the competitive season. Seoul previously co-hosted the 2024 Valorant Champions tournament with Incheon and will also host the finals of the 2027 League of Legends World Championship. With Seoul's selection, it makes them only the second city to host both Masters and Champions, after Shanghai in 2024 (the same year as Seoul's Champions tournament) and 2026.

== Qualification ==
Qualification for Masters Seoul will be through the Kickoff events in each territory. Each of VCT Americas, VCT CN (China), VCT EMEA, and VCT Pacific will send three teams each, specifically the top three best-performing teams in each Kickoff event.
