= Valorant Masters Valencia 2027 =

Esports competition in Spain

Tournament information
- Game: Valorant
- Location: Valencia, Spain
- Date: 5–20 June
- Administrator: Riot Games
- Teams: 12

Valorant Masters Valencia 2027 is an upcoming global Valorant tournament organised by the game's developer, Riot Games, following Stage 1 of the 2027 Valorant Champions Tour (VCT) The tournament will be held in Valencia, Spain, from 5 to 20 June.

It will be the second global Valorant competition to take place in Spain after Masters Madrid 2024 and the first of two Riot Games-organized international esports competitions to be held in Valencia in 2027, with the second being the 2027 Mid-Season Invitational for League of Legends. Teams will qualify based on their placements within their territory's first regional cup.

== Host selection ==
Days before the 2026 Valorant Champions finals in Shanghai, China, Riot Games announced on 15 October 2026 the locations for major tournaments of the 2027 Valorant Champions Tour, with Valencia being confirmed as the host city for the second Masters event of the competitive season. Valencia will also host the 2027 Mid-Season Invitational for League of Legends, but it is currently unclear whether both events will be held at the Feria Valencia, which was confirmed as the main venue for MSI 2027.

== Qualification ==
Qualification for Masters Valencia will be through the first Regional Cups in each territory. Each of VCT Americas, VCT CN (China), VCT EMEA, and VCT Pacific will send three teams each, specifically the top three best-performing teams in each Cup.
