= 2027 Valorant Champions =

7th competition of Valorant Champions

Tournament information
- Sport: Valorant
- Location: Austin, Texas, United States
- Date: 16 September–10 October
- Administrator: Riot Games
- Teams: 16

The 2027 Valorant Champions is an upcoming esports tournament for the first-person tactical hero shooter video game Valorant. It will be the seventh iteration of Valorant Champions, the world championship tournament of the Valorant Champions Tour (VCT) organised by the game's developer, Riot Games. The tournament will be held in Austin, Texas, United States, from 16 September to 10 October.

It will be the second edition of the tournament to be held in the United States, the first to be held outside of the country's West Coast, and the first Champions tournament of the second open qualifiers era.

LOUD of the VCT Americas are the defending champions.

== Host selection ==
Riot Games initially announced in August 2024 that the 2027 edition of Champions would be held in the Americas, but the specific location was not specified at the time. Days before the finals of the 2026 Valorant Champions in Shanghai, China, Austin, Texas was announced as the host city for Champions in 2027. It will be the second international/global Riot Games-sanctioned competition to be held in the state of Texas after the 2026 League of Legends World Championship.

== Qualification ==
Qualification for Champions will be through the second Regional Cup in each territory. Each of VCT Americas, VCT CN (China), VCT EMEA, and VCT Pacific will send four teams: the top two (2) teams in each regional cup and the top (2) teams that have the most Championship Points.
