= 2026 Valorant Champions Tour =

Sixth season of the Valorant Champions Tour

- League: Valorant Champions Tour
- Sport: Valorant
- Duration: January 15 – March 15 (Kickoff + Masters Santiago); March – June 21 (Stage 1 + Masters London); June – October 18 (Stage 2 + Champions)
- Teams: 48 (12 per league)

Masters Santiago
- Champions: Nongshim RedForce
- Runners-up: Paper Rex
- Season MVP: Lee "Dambi" Hyuk-kyu

Masters London
- Champions: Leviatan
- Runners-up: Paper Rex
- Season MVP: Bruno "Neon" Rodriguez

Champions Shanghai
- Champions: LOUD
- Runners-up: Team Vitality
- Season MVP: Roberto "erde" Lobos

VCT seasons
- ← 2025 2027 →

The 2026 Valorant Champions Tour is the sixth season of the Valorant Champions Tour and fourth under the franchised system. The season began on January 15. The first Masters event of the season took place in Santiago, Chile after the Kickoff stage while London, United Kingdom will host the second Masters after Stage 1. The season will culminate with the 2026 Valorant Champions in Shanghai, China, which in turn, will end on October 18.

This will be the final season of the franchised era, as the VCT will return to an open qualifier system starting from the 2027 season.

== Changes ==
=== Team changes ===
League	Additions		Subtractions	
League	▲ Promoted	Partnered	▼ Relegated	Departed
Americas	ENVY	None	2 Game Esports	None
EMEA	PCFIC Esports; ~~ULF Esports~~; Eternal Fire (Note: Eternal Fire replaced ULF Esports in VCT EMEA following ULF's withdrawal from the league after Kickoff due to their failure to operate in line with league standards.)	Gentle Mates (Note: Gentle Mates were originally automatically relegated to Challengers. Following the removal of Movistar KOI from VCT EMEA, Gentle Mates became a new partner team, occupying the former team's slot, and negating their relegation.)	Apeks; ~~Gentle Mates~~	Movistar KOI; ULF Esports
Pacific	VARREL	FULL SENSE	None	Talon Esports
China	No changes			

In VCT Americas, ENVY was promoted from Challengers after finishing first in the Ascension tournament. The team replaced 2Game Esports, who were automatically relegated last season. This will also mark ENVY's return to top-tier Valorant competition, after the team was rebranded to OpTic Gaming in 2022.

On September 6, 2025, Riot Games removed Movistar KOI's slot at VCT EMEA following the termination of their partnership due to the team's violation of the Team Participation Agreement. On October 7, Gentle Mates, who were originally going to be relegated, was announced as a new partner team and occupied the vacant slot left by KOI. BBL PCFIC and Ulf Esports also joined the EMEA league via the Ascension tournament, while Apeks was automatically relegated due to their performance last season. BBL PCFIC will compete as PCFIC Esports.

On November 18, 2025, Riot removed Talon Esports from both VCT Pacific and the League of Legends Championship Pacific following the termination of their partnership due to financial issues and delayed payments to players and coaches. Their slot and roster in the VCT would be acquired by FULL SENSE. SLT was promoted to the Pacific league through the Ascension tournament, replacing BOOM Esports, who finished third in Ascension and failed to retain their slot. During the off-season, the slot and roster of SLT were acquired by VARREL.

On March 20, 2026, ULF Esports withdrew from VCT EMEA before the start of Stage 1 following the organization's challenges to operate in line with league standards and delayed payments. Their slot and roster would be replaced by Eternal Fire.

=== Format changes ===
Starting with this season, the Ascension tournament will no longer be held for the Americas, EMEA, and Pacific leagues. Instead, four Challenger teams from each region will participate in the play-ins of Stage 2, giving them a pathway to Champions.

Additionally, the Kickoff stage will feature a triple-elimination format. As a result, the first Masters event of the season has been expanded from eight to twelve teams.

The China league will also have a full tour throughout the entire 2026 season, with every phase of each stage being hosted in a different city leading up to Champions in Shanghai.

== Kickoff ==
=== Format ===
In each International League, the twelve teams will compete in a triple-elimination bracket, composed of upper, middle, and lower brackets. The four teams in each league that qualified for the 2025 Valorant Champions will earn a bye to the upper bracket quarterfinals while the remaining eight teams will start at the first round of the upper bracket. All matches are best-of-three except for the finals of each bracket, where matches are best-of-five.

A team's first loss will move them to the middle bracket (a traditional lower bracket in a double-elimination tournament), a second loss will move them to the lower bracket, and a third loss eliminates the team from competition and contention for Masters Santiago. Winning the upper, middle, or lower bracket finals awards the team the first, second, and third seed at Masters, respectively.

=== Americas ===
Upper round 1	Upper quarterfinals	Upper semifinals	Upper finals
NRG	2
LOUD	0	Cloud9	0
NRG	1
Cloud9	2
MIBR	2
MIBR	2
ENVY	2	ENVY	0
MIBR	2
Evil Geniuses	1
Furia	3
Sentinels	0
KRÜ Esports	1	Furia	2
Furia	2
Furia	2
G2 Esports	1
G2 Esports	2
100 Thieves	2	100 Thieves	1
Leviatán	1
Middle round 1	Middle round 2	Middle quarterfinals	Middle semifinals	Middle finals
100 Thieves	2
NRG	2
LOUD	1
100 Thieves	2	100 Thieves	0
Sentinels	0	MIBR	0
Sentinels	2
NRG	0	G2 Esports	3
Evil Geniuses	0
G2 Esports	2
ENVY	2
G2 Esports	2
KRÜ Esports	1
ENVY	1	Cloud9	0
Cloud9	2
Cloud9	2
Leviatán	0
Lower round 1	Lower round 2	Lower round 3	Lower quarterfinals	Lower semifinals	Lower finals
MIBR	2
100 Thieves	2
NRG	2	NRG	3
ENVY	0	Evil Geniuses	0
100 Thieves	2	100 Thieves	0
LOUD	0	Evil Geniuses	2
Cloud9	1
Evil Geniuses	2	Cloud9	2
Sentinels	0	Leviatán	0
KRÜ Esports	0	Leviatán	2
Leviatán	2

Source: Valorant Esports

=== EMEA ===
Upper round 1	Upper quarterfinals	Upper semifinals	Upper finals
Team Heretics	1
Natus Vincere	2	Natus Vincere	2
Natus Vincere	0
Karmine Corp	0
Gentle Mates	2
GiantX	0
FUT Esports	0	Gentle Mates	2
Gentle Mates	2
Gentle Mates	2
BBL Esports	3
Fnatic	0
PCFIC Esports	1	BBL Esports	2
BBL Esports	2
BBL Esports	2
Team Vitality	0
Team Liquid	1
ULF Esports	0	Team Vitality	2
Team Vitality	2
Middle round 1	Middle round 2	Middle quarterfinals	Middle semifinals	Middle finals
Team Liquid	2
Natus Vincere	1
Karmine Corp	1
Team Liquid	0	Fnatic	2
Fnatic	2	Gentle Mates	3
Fnatic	2
Fnatic	2	Fnatic	2
FUT Esports	1
Team Vitality	0
GiantX	2
Team Vitality	2
PCFIC Esports	1
GiantX	2	GiantX	0
Team Heretics	0
Team Heretics	2
ULF Esports	0
Lower round 1	Lower round 2	Lower round 3	Lower quarterfinals	Lower semifinals	Lower finals
Fnatic	0
Natus Vincere	0
Team Vitality	1	Team Liquid	3
Team Heretics	2	Team Heretics	2
Team Heretics	0	Team Liquid	2
Karmine Corp	2	Karmine Corp	1
Team Liquid	2
FUT Esports	1	GiantX	1
Team Liquid	2	Team Liquid	2
PCFIC Esports	0	ULF Esports	1
ULF Esports	2

Source: Valorant Esports

=== Pacific ===
Upper round 1	Upper quarterfinals	Upper semifinals	Upper finals
T1	1
Nongshim RedForce	2	Nongshim RedForce	2
Nongshim RedForce	2
Team Secret	0
FULL SENSE	0
DRX	1
ZETA DIVISION	0	FULL SENSE	2
Nongshim RedForce	3
FULL SENSE	2
Rex Regum Qeon	2
Paper Rex	2
VARREL	0	Global Esports	1
Paper Rex	0
Global Esports	2
Rex Regum Qeon	2
Rex Regum Qeon	2
DetonatioN FocusMe	2	DetonatioN FocusMe	0
Gen.G	0
Middle round 1	Middle round 2	Middle quarterfinals	Middle semifinals	Middle finals
DetonatioN FocusMe	2
FULL SENSE	1
Team Secret	0
DetonatioN FocusMe	2	DetonatioN FocusMe	2
Global Esports	1	Rex Regum Qeon	0
Global Esports	2
DetonatioN FocusMe	0	T1	3
ZETA DIVISION	0
T1	2
DRX	2
Paper Rex	1
VARREL	1
DRX	0	T1	2
T1	2
T1	2
Gen.G	1
Lower round 1	Lower round 2	Lower round 3	Lower quarterfinals	Lower semifinals	Lower finals
Rex Regum Qeon	1
FULL SENSE	0
DetonatioN FocusMe	0	Paper Rex	3
DRX	2	DRX	2
DRX	1	Paper Rex	2
Team Secret	1	ZETA DIVISION	1
Paper Rex	2
ZETA DIVISION	2	Paper Rex	2
Global Esports	2	Global Esports	1
VARREL	1	Gen.G	1
Gen.G	2

Source: Valorant Esports

=== China ===
Upper round 1	Upper quarterfinals	Upper semifinals	Upper finals
Bilibili Gaming	0
All Gamers	2	All Gamers	2
All Gamers	2
Nova Esports	0
Dragon Ranger Gaming	1
Dragon Ranger Gaming	2
JD Gaming	2	JD Gaming	1
All Gamers	3
Titan Esports Club	1
Xi Lai Gaming	2
Xi Lai Gaming	2
Trace Esports	1	Wolves Esports	0
Xi Lai Gaming	2
Wolves Esports	2
Edward Gaming	0
Edward Gaming	2
FunPlus Phoenix	0	Tyloo	0
Tyloo	2
Middle round 1	Middle round 2	Middle quarterfinals	Middle semifinals	Middle finals
Tyloo	2
Dragon Ranger Gaming	2
Nova Esports	0
Tyloo	2	Tyloo	1
Titan Esports Club	1	Xi Lai Gaming	3
Wolves Esports	1
Dragon Ranger Gaming	0	Bilibili Gaming	2
Titan Esports Club	2
Bilibili Gaming	2
JD Gaming	1
Edward Gaming	1
Trace Esports	2
Trace Esports	0	Bilibili Gaming	2
Bilibili Gaming	2
Bilibili Gaming	2
FunPlus Phoenix	0
Lower round 1	Lower round 2	Lower round 3	Lower quarterfinals	Lower semifinals	Lower finals
Bilibili Gaming	1
Tyloo	2
Dragon Ranger Gaming	1	Edward Gaming	3
Trace Esports	2	Trace Esports	0
Tyloo	1	Edward Gaming	2
Nova Esports	1	Wolves Esports	1
Edward Gaming	2
Wolves Esports	2	Edward Gaming	2
Titan Esports Club	1	JD Gaming	1
JD Gaming	2	JD Gaming	2
FunPlus Phoenix	1

Source: Valorant Esports

== Masters Santiago ==
=== Format ===
Masters Santiago will see twelve teams competing, up from eight compared to the previous two seasons' Kickoff Masters. The format will replicate that of Stage 1 Masters, with the second and third seeds from each International League competing in a Swiss-system tournament while the top seeds earn a bye to the playoffs.

== Stage 1 ==
=== Format ===
In each International League, the twelve teams will be divided into two groups, where they will then play a single best-of-three round-robin tournament, with the top four teams advancing to the double-elimination playoffs. The top three teams will start at the upper bracket with the top teams earning a bye to the upper bracket semifinals. The fourth-place teams will start at the lower bracket.

The top three teams in the playoffs will qualify for Masters London.

=== Playoffs ===
==== Americas ====
Upper Bracket Round 1	Upper Bracket Round 2	Upper Bracket Final	Grand Final
MIBR	1
FURIA	1	Leviatán	2
Leviatán	2	Leviatán	2
G2 Esports	1
KRÜ Esports	0
G2 Esports	2	G2 Esports	2
100 Thieves	0
Leviatán	2
G2 Esports	3
Lower Bracket Round 1	Lower Bracket Round 2	Lower Bracket Round 3	Lower Bracket Final
KRÜ Esports	0
FURIA	0	NRG	2	G2 Esports	3
NRG	2	NRG	2	NRG	2
100 Thieves	0
MIBR	0
100 Thieves	2	100 Thieves	2
LOUD	0

==== EMEA ====
Upper Bracket Round 1	Upper Bracket Round 2	Upper Bracket Final	Grand Final
FUT Esports	2
Eternal Fire	2	Eternal Fire	1
Team Heretics	1	FUT Esports	1
Team Vitality	2
Fnatic	0
Team Liquid	1	Team Vitality	2
Team Vitality	2
Team Vitality	2
Team Heretics	3
Lower Bracket Round 1	Lower Bracket Round 2	Lower Bracket Round 3	Lower Bracket Final
Fnatic	1
Team Heretics	2	Team Heretics	2	FUT Esports	1
BBL Esports	0	Team Heretics	2	Team Heretics	3
Eternal Fire	1
Eternal Fire	2
Team Liquid	1	Gentle Mates	0
Gentle Mates	2

==== Pacific ====
Upper Bracket Round 1	Upper Bracket Round 2	Upper Bracket Final	Grand Final
Paper Rex	1
Rex Regum Qeon	0	Global Esports	2
Global Esports	2	Global Esports	0
FULL SENSE	2
T1	0
DRX	0	FULL SENSE	2
FULL SENSE	2
FULL SENSE	0
Paper Rex	3
Lower Bracket Round 1	Lower Bracket Round 2	Lower Bracket Round 3	Lower Bracket Final
T1	2
Rex Regum Qeon	2	Rex Regum Qeon	1	Global Esports	0
DetonatioN FocusMe	1	T1	1	Paper Rex	3
Paper Rex	2
Paper Rex	2
DRX	2	DRX	1
Nongshim RedForce	1

==== China ====
Upper Bracket Round 1	Upper Bracket Round 2	Upper Bracket Final	Grand Final
Xi Lai Gaming	2
Titan Esports Club	0
Xi Lai Gaming	0
JD Gaming	2
JD Gaming	2
Tyloo	1
Xi Lai Gaming	0
Edward Gaming	2
All Gamers	2
Trace Esports	0
All Gamers	0
Edward Gaming	2
Edward Gaming	2
Dragon Ranger Gaming	1	Edward Gaming	3
Xi Lai Gaming	2
Lower Bracket Round 1	Lower Bracket Round 2	Lower Bracket Round 3	Lower Bracket Final
All Gamers	2
Titan Esports Club	1	Tyloo	1	Xi Lai Gaming	3
Tyloo	2	All Gamers	1	Dragon Ranger Gaming	1
Dragon Ranger Gaming	2
JD Gaming	0
Trace Esports	0	Dragon Ranger Gaming	2
Dragon Ranger Gaming	2

== Stage 2 ==
=== Format ===
Stage 2 will replicate Stage 1's round-robin tournament, but with top two teams in each group directly advancing to the playoffs. The remaining teams will compete in the new play-ins, where they will be joined by four teams from their region's Challengers system. The play-ins will be a double-elimination tournament, with the top four teams qualifying for the playoffs, while the remaining teams are eliminated.

Stage 2's playoffs will also replicate that of Stage 1, but with the top two teams qualifying for Champions.

== Championship Points ==
Throughout the season, teams can gain Championship Points based on performance in their league and Masters events. At the end of Stage 2, the two teams with the most points that haven't qualified through the playoffs will earn their spot at Champions.

Championship Points distribution
Event	1st	2nd	3rd	4th	5th–6th	Regular season win
Regional Kickoff	4	3	2	1	—N/a	
Masters Santiago	6	4	3	2	1	—N/a
Regional Stage 1	6	4	3	2	—N/a	1
Masters London	8	6	5	4	3	—N/a
Regional Stage 2	Champions qualification		5	4	—N/a	1

=== Americas ===
Pos	Team	KO	M1	S1	M2	S2	Total	Qualification
1	Leviátan	0	–	7	8		15	Guaranteed qualification via Championship Points
2	G2 Esports	3	2	9	0		14	Guaranteed qualification via Championship Points
3	NRG	2	3	9	0		11	Potential qualification via Championship Points
4	FURIA	4	0	3	-		7	Potential qualification via Championship Points
5	100 Thieves	0	–	5	–		5	
6	KRÜ Esports	0	–	4	–		4	
7	MIBR	1	–	3	–		4	
8	LOUD	0	–	3	–		3	
9	ENVY	0	–	2	–		2	
10	Sentinels	0	–	2	–		2	
11	Cloud9	0	–	1	–		1	
12	Evil Geniuses	0	–	0	–		0	

Updated to match(es) played on March 14, 2026. Source: Valorant Esports

=== EMEA ===
Pos	Team	KO	M1	S1	M2	S2	Total	Qualification
1	FUT Esports	0	–	7	3		10	Guaranteed qualification via Championship Points
2	Team Vitality	0	–	6	4		10	Guaranteed qualification via Championship Points
3	Team Heretics	0	–	9	0		9	Potential qualification via Championship Points
4	BBL Esports	4	1	2	-		7	Potential qualification via Championship Points
5	Eternal Fire	0	–	6	-		6	
6	Fnatic	1	–	5	-		6	
7	Team Liquid	2	0	4	-		6	
8	Gentle Mates	3	0	2	-		5	
9	GiantX	0	–	2	-		2	
10	Natus Vincere	0	–	2	-		2	
11	Karmine Corp	0	–	0	-		0	
12	PCFIC Esports	0	–	0	-		0	

Updated to match(es) played on March 10, 2026. Source: Valorant Esports

=== Pacific ===
Pos	Team	KO	M1	S1	M2	S2	Total	Qualification
1	Paper Rex	2	4	10	6		22	Guaranteed qualification via Championship Points
2	Nongshim RedForce	4	6	2	–		12	Guaranteed qualification via Championship Points
3	T1	3	0	7	–		10	Potential qualification via Championship Points
4	FULL SENSE	0	–	7	0		7	Potential qualification via Championship Points
5	Global Esports	0	–	6	0		6	
6	Rex Regum Qeon	1	–	4	–		5	
7	DRX	0	–	4	–		4	
8	DetonatioN FocusMe	0	–	2	–		2	
9	Gen.G	0	–	1	–		1	
10	Team Secret	0	–	1	–		1	
11	ZETA DIVISION	0	–	1	–		1	
12	VARREL	0	–	0	–		0	

Updated to match(es) played on March 15, 2026. Source: Valorant Esports

=== China ===
Pos	Team	KO	M1	S1	M2	S2	Total	Qualification
1	Edward Gaming	2	0	10	5		17	Guaranteed qualification via Championship Points
2	Xi Lai Gaming	3	0	9	3		15	Guaranteed qualification via Championship Points
3	All Gamers	4	1	5	-		10	Potential qualification via Championship Points
4	Dragon Ranger Gaming	0	–	6	0		6	Potential qualification via Championship Points
5	Bilibili Gaming	1	–	2	-		3	
6	JD Gaming	0	–	3	-		3	
7	Tyloo	0	–	3	-		3	
8	FunPlus Phoenix	0	–	2	-		2	
9	Titan Esports Club	0	–	2	-		2	
10	Trace Esports	0	–	2	-		2	
11	Nova Esports	0	–	1	-		1	
12	Wolves Esports	0	–	0	-		0	

Updated to match(es) played on March 10, 2026. Source: Valorant Esports
