= Valorant Champions Tour =

Professional esports league

- Current season, competition or edition: 2026 Valorant Champions Tour
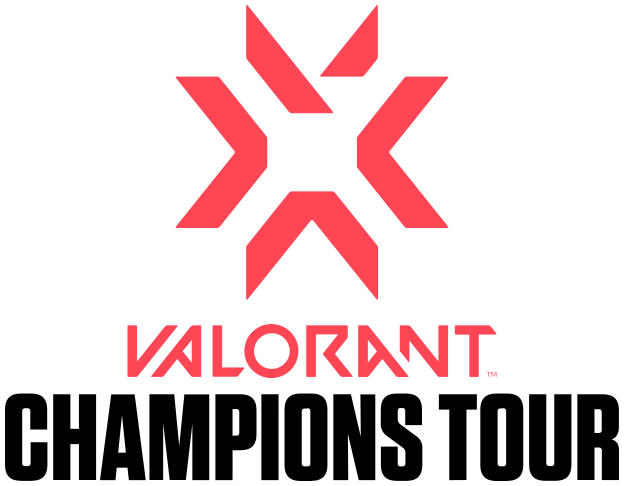
- Game: Valorant
- Founded: 2020; 6 years ago
- First season: 2021; 5 years ago
- Owner: Riot Games
- Director: Leo Faria
- Country: Global
- Website: valorantesports.com

The Valorant Champions Tour (VCT) is a global competitive esports tournament series for the video game Valorant organized by Riot Games, the game's developers. The series runs multiple events throughout each season, culminating in Valorant Champions, the top-level event of the tour. The VCT was announced in 2020, with its inaugural season taking place in 2021.

== History ==
=== 2021–2022: First open qualifiers era ===
In November 2020, Riot Games announced the first Valorant Champions Tour, a tournament series divided into three tiers: Challengers, Masters, and Champions. Challengers would act as the lowest tier, split into seven regions: North America, Brazil, Latin America (Hispanic America), EMEA, Southeast Asia (which later included South Asia and Oceania, becoming the Asia-Pacific region), Korea, Japan. Teams that advance past Challengers would move on to Masters, where teams would not be divided by regions anymore, and the top 16 teams from Masters would move on to Champions, the final tournament of VCT. In February 2021, they announced the VCT Game Changers, a supplementary tournament initiative for women and marginalized genders.

Riot hired esports infrastructure company Nerd Street Gamers as operators and producers for all North American Challengers and Masters events. They also hired several third-party companies to broadcast their events, such as Liga de Videojuegos Profesional (LVP) for their Spanish-language broadcasts and LetsPlay.Live for their Oceania broadcasts. The 2021 Champions tournament took place on December 1–12 at the Verti Music Hall in Berlin, Germany, concluding with team Acend defeating Gambit Esports in the grand finals by a score of 3–2.

Over 10,000 teams competed in the VCT in 2021. Outside of Champions, VCT saw its highest viewership at the Reykjavík Masters tournament in May, with a peak viewership of 1,085,850. The Champions grand finals match in December reached a peak viewership of 1,089,068, making it the VCT's highest peak viewership.

Riot made several changes to the format of VCT for its second iteration. While the overall structure of Challengers, Masters, and Champions remained unchanged, it reduced the number of stages of Challengers and Masters events from three to two. VCT Challengers began on February 11, 2022. The 2022 Champions Tournament took place from September 1 to 18 in Istanbul, Turkey where LOUD defeated OpTic Gaming 3-1 to become the 2022 World Champions.

=== 2023–2026: Franchised era ===
Riot Games announced a new format starting in 2023. The season would be split into three international regions – Americas, EMEA, and Pacific instead of the 7 regions format used in previous years. Each international region will have its own International League that replaces the Challengers to become the domestic competitions to qualify for Masters and Champions. On September 21, 2022, Riot Games announced the thirty teams that had been selected as part of their new partnership format in 2023-2027.

In February 2023, Riot partnered with Grid Esports for performance analysis data.

For China, Riot Games showed favor towards players here by giving Chinese teams a number of direct slots to participate in global tournaments (Masters and Champions) through third parties competitions in Hong Kong server, instead of having to play through Pacific league. In a June 2023 press conference, Riot COO Whalen Rozelle confirmed that Valorant would launch in China in July under the name 无畏契约 (lit. 'Fearless Contract'), with hopes to launch a VCT league there in 2024. Shortly after in August, Riot announced a regional league for China, raising the number of partnered teams to 40.

Immediately after its first year of implementation, the franchising system that Riot Games had made for VCT was criticized as being unsuitable. It created significant difficulties for non-partner teams (a.k.a "tier 2 teams"), as the path to going professional and qualifying for Masters/Champions was no longer open, requiring more time and financial resources. These teams also did not receive the same level of support as partner teams ("tier 1 teams") unless they won Ascension, facing the risk of having their talent poached and struggle to maintain both financial stability and competitive strength. In fact, many non-partner teams were eventually forced to disband after failing to win Challengers and Ascension tournaments. A lot of criticism was directed at Riot Games, specifically from the 2021 Champions winner team Acend and the two-time Masters winner player TenZ, for focusing primarily on tier 1 while gradually ignoring the tier 2 scene. Although Riot Games never made an official statement, their subsequent actions seemed to implicitly acknowledge that the franchising system had suffered irreparable failures at the tier 2, ultimately leading to the early termination of the franchising era in 2026, one year ahead of schedule, and to the unveiling of a new Valorant esports system, which will be applied from the start of the 2027 season.

=== 2027–future: Second open qualifiers era ===
To fix issues with the franchising system, on April 8, 2026, Riot Games announced a new format overhaul starting from the 2027 season. It retains the three-split system but using the regional open qualifier system from the pre-2023 era. All teams will have to play through the qualifiers, including partner teams, meaning there will be no tier 2 system. In Stage 1 and Stage 2, the top teams from open qualifiers will compete in a new type of international event known as Cups, which qualifies the top teams to Masters and Champions. The Kickoff stage will continue to utilize a separate format for its international tournament. Leagues will be disbanded but the four major regions will remain intact, with each region hosting their respective cups. The partnership system will also switch to a two-year cycle in 2027, retaining existing incentives in addition to placement to a later round of open qualifiers. Non-partner teams will also receive additional financial support for sustainability.

== Teams ==
=== Second open qualifiers era (2027–future) ===
In 2026, 32 teams in all four VCT territories were selected to be partner teams for each region for 2 years (until 2028), in line with the format overhaul. Each of the partnered teams was allowed automatic entry into Kickoff, but have to secure its qualification for Cups, Masters and Champions on merit. In VCT CN, the eight partner teams automatically qualify for Kickoff and Cups, and two visitor teams each year will be given direct qualification access via the "Threshold" tournament, similar to the former Ascension system, while the remaining teams for Kickoff and Cups will be decided by open qualifiers. The two visitor teams also automatically qualify for Kickoff and Cups.

- VCT Americas
  - 100 Thieves
  - G2 Esports
  - Leviatán
  - KRÜ Esports
  - LOUD
  - MIBR
  - NRG Esports
  - Sentinels
- VCT CN
  - All Gamers
  - Bilibili Gaming
  - Dragon Ranger Gaming*
  - Nova Esports*
  - Edward Gaming
  - JD Gaming
  - Trace Esports
  - TYLOO
  - Weibo Gaming
  - Xi Lai Gaming
- VCT EMEA
  - BBL Esports
  - Fnatic
  - FUT Esports
  - Karmine Corp
  - Gentle Mates
  - Team Heretics
  - Team Liquid
  - Team Vitality
- VCT Pacific
  - Crazy Raccoon
  - FULL SENSE
  - GAM Esports
  - Gen.G
  - Paper Rex
  - Rex Regum Qeon
  - T1
  - ZETA DIVISION

(*) Visitor teams in VCT CN

=== Franchised leagues (2023–2026) ===
In 2023, 30 teams were selected to be partner teams in International Leagues for five years (up to 2027, this ended up being shortened to 2026 with the 2027 VCT Format overhaul) with 10 teams per region. Non-partner teams compete in many sub-regions of Challengers events to qualify for Ascension events. The Ascension events in 2023 and 2024 had one winner per region, which earned them a temporary (initially two-year) promotion into their regions' International League. The promoted teams have a chance to qualify for the global tournaments (Masters and Champions), as well as get benefits provided to other partnered teams. Through the Challengers promotion system, International Leagues expanded by one team each, until they reached a cap of 12 teams in each region in 2025 (beforehand this was supposed to be a 14-team cap by 2027).

In China since the game's global launch, although Valorant had not been licensed for release in the country, Riot Games showed favor towards Chinese players by allowing Chinese teams to participate in global tournaments (Masters and Champions) through achievements in domestic tournaments organized by third parties, played at Hong Kong server. (Note: Although it has the same status as the game had not been officially released locally, in contrast to the favor given to China, Riot Games did not allow players and teams from Vietnam to participate in 2020 First Strike and 2021 VCT stage 1.) Since 2024, with Valorant licensed for release servers in Mainland China, Riot launched the VCT CN specifically for the only country that they considered competitive against the three International Leagues for many countries, as well as competition slots for teams from China at Masters and Champions. They also announced the second Masters event of the year to take place in Shanghai and released a new Chinese agent Iso alongside previous agent Sage.

Ten Chinese teams were selected as partner teams for the first franchising era of the VCT CN (originally planned to run until 2027, but later decided to end in 2026 at the same time as International Leagues), with two additional non-partner teams qualifying through China Ascension.

For 2025, the two temporary teams per International League can stay up via qualifying for Champions, compete in Ascension to stay in the league if they finished 5th to 8th, or get relegated back to their Challengers region if finishing 9th to 12th; only one of the guest teams per region can stay up via Champions, with the best performer of the two guests taking the spot if both qualify.

Ultimately, with the growing crisis in tier 2, Riot Games later decided to end the franchising era in 2026, one year earlier than originally planned (2027), in order to reassess existing partners and prepare for the new open qualifiers era.

Teams in each territory played on LAN in a centralized location: the Riot Games Arena in Los Angeles for VCT Americas, Riot Games Arena in Berlin for VCT EMEA, Sangam SOOP Colosseum in Seoul for VCT Pacific, and VCT CN Arena in Shanghai for VCT CN (until 2025 before moving to various venues across the country in 2026).

- VCT Americas
  - 100 Thieves
  - Cloud9
  - ENVY*
  - Evil Geniuses
  - G2 Esports* (Note: While The Guard won the 2023 Americas Ascension tournament, which guaranteed that they would participate in the VCT Americas League, on August 29, 2023, it was announced that they would not compete in VCT Americas for their stint (2024 and 2025) as they had not agreed to the Team Participation Agreement. On September 22, 2023, it was announced that G2 Esports had acquired all but one member of The Guard's roster, thus taking over their slot.)
  - FURIA
  - KRÜ Esports
  - Leviatán
  - LOUD
  - MIBR
  - NRG
  - Sentinels
- VCT CN
  - All Gamers
  - Bilibili Gaming
  - Dragon Ranger Gaming*
  - Edward Gaming
  - FunPlus Phoenix
  - JD Gaming
  - Nova Esports
  - Titan Esports Club
  - Trace Esports
  - TYLOO
  - Wolves Esports
  - Xi Lai Gaming*
- VCT EMEA
  - BBL Esports
  - Eternal Fire* (Note: On 20 March 2026, Riot Games announced that Eternal Fire would replace ULF Esports in VCT EMEA, following reports of ULF failing to operate in line with league standards, including failure to pay salaries and bonuses tied to their Ascension win. ULF voluntarily withdrew from the league.)
  - Fnatic
  - FUT Esports
  - Gentle Mates (Note: On September 6, 2025, Riot Games terminated the VCT EMEA partnership slot occupied by Movistar KOI, who had been a partner since 2023, for violating the Team Participation Agreement. Their replacement would be Gentle Mates, who were initially an ascension team, promoted to VCT EMEA in 2024 and relegated after finishing 9th-12th in 2025.)
  - GiantX (Note: Team had competed as Giants previously. On 14 December 2023, Giants Gaming and Excel Esports announced a merger, forming GiantX.)
  - Karmine Corp
  - Natus Vincere
  - PCIFIC Esports* (Note: PCIFIC Esports earned their spot in VCT EMEA via winning the 2025 Ascension EMEA as BBL PCFIC, an affiliate partnership with BBL Esports.)
  - Team Heretics
  - Team Liquid
  - Team Vitality
- VCT Pacific
  - DetonatioN FocusMe
  - DRX
  - FULL SENSE (Note: On November 18, 2025, Riot Games terminated the VCT Pacific partnership slot occupied by Talon Esports, who had been a partner since 2023, for financial insecurity and failing to pay its players and coaches in a timely manner. Their spot will be taken by FULL SENSE, retaining Talon's roster.)
  - Global Esports
  - Gen.G
  - Nongshim RedForce (Note: Sin Prisa Gaming earned promotion to the VCT after winning the 2024 Pacific Ascension. On 25 November 2024, it was announced that Nongshim RedForce had bought Sin Prisa, taking with them their guest spot in VCT Pacific. The team won the 2025 Pacific Ascension as Nongshim RedForce.)
  - Paper Rex
  - Rex Regum Qeon
  - T1
  - Team Secret
  - VARREL* (Note: SLT Seongnam earned promotion to the VCT via the 2025 Pacific Ascension. On 12 December 2025, it was announced that SLT would compete as VARREL for the 2026 VCT Pacific season, as Japanese organization VARREL had acquired the roster.)
  - ZETA DIVISION

(*) Non-partner teams in franchise system

== Tournaments ==
=== Valorant Champions ===
Valorant Champions is the season-ending tournament of the competitive Valorant calendar. It is considered the most important tournament of the entire season, with its first edition being held in 2021 in Berlin, Germany. Teams qualify based on placement across the four territories and championship points earned throughout the season, and compete for the title of Valorant World Champion. LOUD of the VCT Americas are the defending champions, having won the 2026 edition.

The next edition of Champions will take place in 2027 in Austin, Texas, United States.

=== Valorant Masters ===
The Valorant Masters is a biannual Valorant international tournament organized by Riot Games in the middle of the year since 2021. Similar to the Mid-Season Invitational for League of Legends, it is the second most important international Valorant tournament after Champions. There are usually two Masters tournaments each year. (Note: For 2023, to celebrate the new partnership system, Riot Games replaced the first split of International Leagues and a Masters by a season's kick-off global event called "VCT LOCK//IN" for all 30 partner teams and 2 invited teams from China. The winning team of this event is regarded to have won a Masters title.) Teams must place near the top of their regional league to qualify for Masters.

The two Masters tournaments for the 2027 calendar will take place in Seoul, South Korea, and Valencia, Spain.

=== Valorant Game Changers ===
Valorant Game Changers is a series of domestic competitions for women and other marginalized genders within Valorant esports. Teams that finish in top places qualify for the Valorant Game Changers Championship, the world championship event of Game Changers. Starting in 2027, the tournament will be held at the same time as Valorant Champions, with the next edition taking place in Austin, Texas, United States.

=== Other tournaments ===
Kickoff and Cups

Each VCT territory host one kickoff event and two regional cups every year that serve as qualification pathways for Valorant Masters and Valorant Champions. With the exception of Kickoff, where all eight partner teams qualify, teams secure qualification via the open qualifiers, except for VCT CN where all partner teams and the two visitor teams automatically qualify, with two slots contested via the open qualifiers.

Challengers and Ascension

Non-partner teams compete in Challengers events of sub-regions in Americas, EMEA and Pacific to qualify for "Ascension", the yearly promotion event to the respective International Leagues. Originally, it was announced that teams would have two-year stays in their International League after winning Ascension, with one team promoted every year until 2026, when two teams would be promoted every year until 2028. The leagues would have 14 teams each, totaling to 42 teams across the three leagues.

On June 21, 2024, Riot announced changes to the Ascension format from 2025, with teams promoted to the International Leagues for one-year stays instead, after which they would be relegated to Challengers again if they did not finish in the top 8 in their region's regional League; if they qualified for Champions however, they get to stay for another year; if they finished in the playoffs of the International League, they qualify for that year's Ascension for a chance to keep their place in the league.

In 2023-24, there are 23 minor regional leagues across the three international territories. From 2025, they got decreased to 15.

In 2026, due to end the first franchising era one year earlier, Ascensions will be not hosted. Instead, Challengers teams will have chance to join their respective VCT league's in Stage 2 play-off, giving them a pathway to qualify for Champions directly.

== Results ==
=== International Leagues & China League winners ===
| Year | Event | Americas | EMEA | Pacific | China |
|---|---|---|---|---|---|
| 2023 | League | LOUD | Team Liquid | Paper Rex | League did not exist |
| 2024 | Kickoff | Sentinels | Karmine Corp | Gen.G | Edward Gaming |
| 2024 | Stage 1 | 100 Thieves | Fnatic | Paper Rex | Edward Gaming |
| 2024 | Stage 2 | Leviatán | Fnatic | Gen.G | Edward Gaming |
| 2025 | Kickoff | G2 Esports | Team Vitality | DRX | Edward Gaming |
| 2025 | Stage 1 | G2 Esports | Fnatic | Rex Regum Qeon | Xi Lai Gaming |
| 2025 | Stage 2 | G2 Esports | Team Liquid | Paper Rex | Bilibili Gaming |
| 2026 | Kickoff (Note: The 2026 Kickoff stage didn't feature a grand final match, instead culminating with bracket finals. The team listed in the region's first seed (the winner of the upper bracket finals) heading into Masters.) | Furia | BBL Esports | Nongshim RedForce | All Gamers |
| 2026 | Stage 1 | G2 Esports | Team Heretics | Paper Rex | Edward Gaming |
| 2026 | Stage 2 | 100 Thieves | Karmine Corp | Global Esports | TYLOO |

=== Global tournaments ===
==== Valorant Masters ====
| Year | Event | Location | Final | | | | Teams | Ref. |
| Year | Event | Location | Winner | Score | | Runner-up | Teams | Ref. |
|---|---|---|---|---|---|---|---|---|
| 2021 | Stage 2 Masters (Note: Riot Games did not host an international Masters event for 2021 Stage 1 due to the COVID-19 pandemic. Instead, each region had its domestic Stage 1 Masters.) | Reykjavík | Sentinels | 3 | 0 | Fnatic | 10 | |
| 2021 | Stage 3 Masters | Berlin | Gambit Esports | 3 | 0 | Team Envy | 16 | |
| 2022 | Stage 1 Masters | Reykjavík | OpTic Gaming | 3 | 0 | LOUD | 12 | |
| 2022 | Stage 2 Masters | Copenhagen | FunPlus Phoenix | 3 | 2 | Paper Rex | 12 | |
| 2023 | LOCK//IN | São Paulo | Fnatic | 3 | 2 | LOUD | 32 | |
| 2023 | Masters Tokyo | Chiba (Note: Although this event had been named "Masters Tokyo", it was held in Chiba.) | Fnatic | 3 | 0 | Evil Geniuses | 12 | |
| 2024 | Masters Madrid | Madrid | Sentinels | 3 | 2 | Gen.G | 8 | |
| 2024 | Masters Shanghai | Shanghai | Gen.G | 3 | 2 | Team Heretics | 12 | |
| 2025 | Masters Bangkok | Bangkok | T1 | 3 | 2 | G2 Esports | 8 | |
| 2025 | Masters Toronto | Toronto | Paper Rex | 3 | 1 | Fnatic | 12 | |
| 2026 | Masters Santiago | Santiago | Nongshim RedForce | 3 | 0 | Paper Rex | 12 | |
| 2026 | Masters London | London | Leviatán | 3 | 2 | Paper Rex | 12 | |
| 2027 | Masters Seoul | Seoul | | | | | | |
| 2027 | Masters Valencia | Valencia | | | | | | |

==== Valorant Champions ====
| Ed. | Year | Host | Final | | | 3rd Place | 4th Place | Teams | Ref. |
| Ed. | Year | Host | Winners | Score | Runners-up | 3rd Place | 4th Place | Teams | Ref. |
|---|---|---|---|---|---|---|---|---|---|
| 1 | 2021 | Germany | Acend | 3–2; Verti Music Hall, Berlin | Gambit Esports | KRÜ Esports, Team Liquid | | 16 | |
| 2 | 2022 | Turkey | LOUD | 3–1; Volkswagen Arena, Istanbul | OpTic Gaming | DRX | FunPlus Phoenix | 16 | |
| 3 | 2023 | United States | Evil Geniuses | 3–1; Kia Forum, Inglewood | Paper Rex | LOUD | Fnatic | 16 | |
| 4 | 2024 | South Korea | Edward Gaming | 3–2; Inspire Arena, Incheon | Team Heretics | Leviatán | Sentinels | 16 | |
| 5 | 2025 | France | NRG | 3–2; Accor Arena, Paris | Fnatic | DRX | Paper Rex | 16 | |
| 6 | 2026 | China | LOUD | 3–1; Mercedes-Benz Arena, Shanghai | Team Vitality | 100 Thieves | G2 Esports | 16 | |
| 7 | 2027 | United States | | Future event TBA, Austin | | | | TBD | |

==== Teams' titles ====
* Team or organization no longer participates in Valorant esports.

| Team | Region | Champions | Masters | Total |
|---|---|---|---|---|
| LOUD | Americas | 2 | 0 | 2 |
| Acend | EMEA | 1 | 0 | 1 |
| Edward Gaming | China | 1 | 0 | 1 |
| Evil Geniuses | Americas | 1 | 0 | 1 |
| NRG | Americas | 1 | 0 | 1 |
| Fnatic | EMEA | 0 | 2 (Note: Included 2023 LOCK//IN's title) | 2 |
| Sentinels | Americas | 0 | 2 | 2 |
| FunPlus Phoenix (Note: FunPlus Phoenix is competing in China currently. Before 2023, they had competed in the CIS sub-region and EMEA. This roster then mostly competed in Natus Vincere.) | EMEA | 0 | 1 | 1 |
| Gambit Esports | EMEA | 0 | 1 | 1 |
| Gen.G | Pacific | 0 | 1 | 1 |
| Leviatán | Americas | 0 | 1 | 1 |
| Nongshim RedForce | Pacific | 0 | 1 | 1 |
| OpTic Gaming | Americas | 0 | 1 | 1 |
| Paper Rex | Pacific | 0 | 1 | 1 |
| T1 | Pacific | 0 | 1 | 1 |

==== Regions' titles ====
| Region | Champions | Masters | Total |
|---|---|---|---|
| Americas (VCT Americas) | 4 | 4 | 8 |
| EMEA (VCT EMEA) | 1 | 4 | 5 |
| China (VCT CN) | 1 | 0 | 1 |
| Pacific (VCT Pacific) | 0 | 4 | 4 |

=== Ascension winners ===
| Year | Americas | EMEA | | Pacific | | China |
|---|---|---|---|---|---|---|
| 2023 | The Guard | Gentle Mates | | BLEED Esports (Note: Due to winners of the 2023 Pacific Ascension, BLEED Esports promoted to VCT Pacific League in 2024 and 2025 seasons. However on 4 October 2024, Riot removed them from the VCT Pacific League, citing a "failure to comply with critical reporting requirements and other key obligations under the Team Participation Agreement", and replaced them with BOOM Esports, which were runners-up of the 2024 Pacific Ascension.) | | Dragon Ranger Gaming |
| 2024 | 2Game Esports | Apeks | | Sin Prisa Gaming | | Xi Lai Gaming |
| 2025 | ENVY | ULF Esports | BBL PCIFIC | SLT Seongnam | Nongshim RedForce | Dragon Ranger Gaming |

=== Valorant Game Changers Championship ===
| Year | Location | Final | | | |
| Year | Location | Champion | Score | | Runner-up |
|---|---|---|---|---|---|
| 2022 | Berlin | G2 Gozen | 3 | 2 | Shopify Rebellion GC |
| 2023 | São Paulo | Shopify Rebellion | 3 | 2 | Team Liquid Brazil |
| 2024 | Berlin | Shopify Rebellion | 3 | 0 | MIBR GC |
| 2025 | Seoul | Team Liquid Brazil | 3 | 2 | Shopify Rebellion Gold |
| 2026 | São Paulo | KRÜ Blaze | 3 | 2 | Gentle Mates GC |
| 2027 | Austin | | | | |

== Music ==
Music in Valorant esports tournaments have been used to promote both regional and international competitions. Champions have had official theme songs since its inception in 2021.

Champions songs

| Year | Song | Performers | Writer(s) and producer(s) | Notes |
|---|---|---|---|---|
| 2021 | Die For You | Grabbitz | Grabbitz | Zedd, and Dabin, produced their own respective remix versions of the theme song. |
| 2022 | Fire Again | Ashnikko | Ashnikko, Grabbitz, Slinger | |
| 2023 | Ticking Away | Grabbitz & bbno$ | Grabbitz, bbno$ | |
| 2024 | Superpower | Julie & Natty (Kiss of Life), Mark Tuan of Got7 | Kill Dave, Cal Scruby, Dabin, Dalton Diehl, Gianni Taylor, Joshua Landry | |
| 2025 | Last Shot | templuv, 347aidan | Julian Conner, Brodin Plett, Aidan Fuller | |
| 2026 | If The Sun Burns Out Tonight | Grabbitz, Oli Sykes, Courtney LaPlante | Nicholas Chiari, Frank Regelski, Grabbitz, Oli Sykes | |

== Awards ==
=== Masters ===
The original masters trophy was unveiled by Riot at a May 2021 media preview event in the build up to Masters Reykjavik. It features a metal bottom and a glass top.The trophy was redesigned in 2023, again by Volpin Props, to be reusable for Masters tournaments in multiple regions. It stands at 18 inches (46 cm) and features a swappable 'Radianite' core. The body of the trophy is palladium-plated with plastic components.

Each trophy is designed with motifs referencing or hinting at the game's agents or maps. For Masters Tokyo, it featured duelist Yoru's ultimate Oni mask. For Madrid, it featured butterflies, which is the motif for the then-newest controller, Clove. For Shanghai, it featured duelist Iso's lilac-themed shield. For Bangkok, it featured a diamond, which is the ability icon for the newest duelist, Waylay. For Toronto, the trophy's core is redesigned in a pink-colored iceberg, which is the theme for the newest map, Corrode. For Santiago, it featured a soundbox, which is the motif for the newest controller, Miks. For London, it featured Sage's Healing Orb surrounded in crystals, which is the theme for the newest map, Summit.

=== Champions ===
The Valorant Champions trophy was first unveiled ahead of Valorant Champions 2021. Also designed and built by Volpin Props of Atlanta, Georgia, it stands at 2 feet (61 cm) tall and is partially 3D-printed, with 24 karat gold decoration overlaid.
