= 2027 League of Legends World Championship =

17th competition of the League of Legends World Championship

Tournament information
- Sport: League of Legends
- Location: Japan; South Korea
- Administrator: Riot Games
- Host(s): Nagoya; Suwon; Seoul
- Venue: 3 (in 3 host cities)

The 2027 League of Legends World Championship (Japanese: 「リーグ・オブ・レジェンド」世界大会2027; Korean: 2027 리그 오브 레전드 월드 챔피언십) is an upcoming esports tournament for the multiplayer online battle arena video game League of Legends, set to be held in Japan and South Korea — in Nagoya, Suwon, and Seoul, from October to November 2027. It is the seventeenth iteration of the League of Legends World Championship, an annual international tournament organised by the game's developer, Riot Games.

It will be the first international League of Legends competition to take place in Japan, the first World Championship to be held in the Asia-Pacific (APAC) region since 2014 and the first under the League of Legends Championship Pacific (LCP) banner, and South Korea's third hosting of the tournament after the 2014, 2018, and 2023 editions. Teams will qualify based on placement within their regional leagues and results gained in the 2027 Mid-Season Invitational (MSI).

Bilibili Gaming of China's League of Legends Pro League (LPL) are the defending champions, having beat Gen.G in the 2026 final.

== Host selection ==
In a development update video published on 8 January 2025 to begin that year's competitive season, Riot Games announced that South Korea will host the 2027 edition of Worlds. The following year, in March 2026, the Korea e-Sports Association (KeSPA) opened the bidding process for potential host cities for the knockout stage.

During the media day for the 2026 World Championship Final in New York City, United States, on 13 November 2026, Riot Games added Nagoya in Japan as a host city for the Swiss stage, and confirmed Suwon and Seoul as the host cities for the knockout stage and finals, respectively. With Nagoya's addition, it will be the first time the country hosts an official major Riot Games-sanctioned international tournament since the 2025 VCT Pacific Stage 2 finals, which were hosted at LaLa Arena Tokyo Bay in Chiba.

Seoul hosted the 2014, 2018, and 2023 World Championship editions and is the home city of the League of Legends Champions Korea (LCK), while this will be Suwon's first time hosting an international League of Legends competition. Nagoya in Aichi Prefecture was the host city of the 2026 Asian Games, which held an esports tournament for League of Legends and other game titles.

== Venues ==
Three venues will be used for the tournament. In South Korea, the Suwon Convention Center will host the quarterfinals and semifinals, while the new Seoul Arena in the Chang-dong neighborhood located in the city's Dobong District will stage the finals. The Suwon Convention Center previously hosted LCK Roadshow events hosted by Gen.G and KT Rolster during the 2025 LCK season, while the Seoul Arena has a capacity of 28,000 and is set to open in June 2027.

No venue has been confirmed yet for Nagoya.

Nagoya, Japan	South Korea	
Nagoya, Japan	Suwon	Seoul
Swiss Stage	Quarterfinals and Semifinals	Finals
TBD	Suwon Convention Center	Seoul Arena
Capacity: TBD	Capacity: TBD	Capacity: 28,000
2027 League of Legends World Championship is located in Japan	2027 League of Legends World Championship is located in South Korea	

== Qualification ==
The Campeonato Brasileiro de League of Legends (CBLOL), League of Legends Champions Korea (LCK), League of Legends Championship Pacific (LCP), League Championship Series (LCS), League of Legends EMEA Championship (LEC), and League of Legends Pro League (LPL) will send qualified teams each, but the quota distribution has not been determined.
