= Valorant Masters Bangkok 2025 =

Valorant esports competition in Thailand

Tournament information
- Game: Valorant
- Location: Bangkok, Thailand
- Date: February 20 – March 2, 2025
- Administrator: Riot Games
- Tournament formats: Group stage; Swiss-system; Playoffs; Double Elimination
- Teams: 8
- Purse: US$500,000

Final positions
- Champions: T1
- Runner-up: G2 Esports

Tournament statistics
- Finals MVP: Kim "Meteor" Tae-oh (T1)
- Highest Kills: Yu "BuZz" Byung-chul (370 kills) (T1)
- Highest ACS: Ayaz "nAts" Akhmetshin (258) (TL)

Valorant Masters Bangkok 2025 was a global tournament organized by Riot Games for the first-person shooter game Valorant as part of the Valorant Champions Tour 2025 competitive season. The tournament was held from February 20 to March 2 in Bangkok, Thailand, at UOB Live.

Pacific team T1 defeated Americas team G2 Esports in the grand finals to win their first international Valorant event, as well as the region's second Masters title.

== Qualification ==
The winner (seed 1) and the runner-up (seed 2) in kickoff stages from three International Leagues (Americas, EMEA, Pacific) and China League qualified for the event.

(*) Non-partner teams in franchise system

Qualified teams
Regions	Kickoffs Winner	Kickoffs Runner-up
Americas	G2 Esports*	Sentinels
EMEA	Team Vitality	Team Liquid
Pacific	DRX	T1
China	Edward Gaming	Trace Esports

== Swiss Stage ==
- All eight teams played in the Swiss-system format with three rounds.
  - In round 1, the seed 1 teams of respective league's kick-offs faced the seed 2 of another region's kick-off league.
  - From round 2 onwards, matchups were determined after each round of play, based on win-loss record.
- Teams with two wins advanced to the playoffs, while teams with two losses were eliminated.
- All matches were best-of-three series.

Advance to Playoffs
1–0	Team Vitality
0–0	Team Vitality	2	Edward Gaming	Advance to Playoffs
Team Liquid	0	DRX	1	T1
Edward Gaming	2	G2 Esports	1	1–1	G2 Esports
Sentinels	0	Edward Gaming	2	T1	2
DRX	2	DRX	0
T1	0	0–1	G2 Esports	2
Team Vitality	2	T1	2	Team Liquid	0	Eliminated
G2 Esports	2	Trace Esports	0	DRX
Trace Esports	0	Sentinels	1	Eliminated	Team Liquid
Team Liquid	2	Trace Esports
Sentinels

== Playoffs ==
- Teams that had a 2–0 win-loss record were seeded against those who had a 2–1 win-loss record in the Swiss stage.
- All matches are a best-of-three series, except the Lower Bracket Final and Grand Final, which were best-of-five series.

Upper Bracket Semifinals
T1	1
Edward Gaming	2
G2 Esports	2
Team Vitality	0
Lower Semifinal
T1	2
Team Vitality	1

Upper Bracket Final
G2 Esports	2
Edward Gaming	0
Lower Bracket Final
Edward Gaming	1
T1	3

Grand Final
G2 Esports	2
T1	3

== Final standings ==
All participating teams were awarded a share of the US$500,000 prize pool. Additionally, 1st through 4th place teams earned Championship Points to help them qualify for the 2025 Valorant Champions Paris, which will be held in September.

Place	Team	Winnings (USD)	Championship Points
1st	T1	$250,000	5
2nd	G2 Esports	$100,000	3
3rd	Edward Gaming	$65,000	2
4th	Team Vitality	$35,000	1
5th-6th	DRX	$15,000	0
5th-6th	Team Liquid	$15,000	0
7th-8th	Sentinels	$10,000	0
7th-8th	Trace Esports	$10,000	0
