= 2023 Valorant Champions =

Gaming tournament

Tournament information
- Game: Valorant
- Location: Los Angeles and Inglewood, United States
- Dates: August 6–August 26
- Administrator: Riot Games
- Tournament format(s): GSL Format (group stage); Double Elimination (playoffs)
- Venues: 2: Shrine Auditorium and Expo Hall (Group Stage and Bracket Stage); Kia Forum (Upper Bracket Finals, Lower Bracket Semifinals and Finals, and Grand Finals)
- Teams: 16
- Purse: $2,250,000 USD

Final positions
- Champions: Evil Geniuses
- Runner-up: Paper Rex

Tournament statistics
- Attendance: 11,500
- MVP: Max "Demon1" Mazanov (EG)

The 2023 Valorant Champions was an esports tournament for the video game Valorant. This was the third edition of the Valorant Champions, the crowning event of the Valorant Champions Tour (VCT) for the 2023 Valorant competitive season. The tournament was held between August 6 and August 26, 2023 in Los Angeles, along with Inglewood, California, United States. Sixteen teams qualified for the tournament based on their result in the regular season leagues, 2023 Masters Tokyo, and the regional Last Chance Qualifiers.

"Ticking Away" was announced as the tournament's theme song, produced, composed and performed by Grabbitz and bbno$.

LOUD were the defending champions, but were eliminated in the Lower Bracket Finals to Evil Geniuses, who eventually won the Valorant world championship after defeating Paper Rex from Pacific in the finals by a score of 3–1. Maximilian "Demon1" Mazanov from Evil Geniuses was named MVP of the tournament.

== History ==
In September 2022, Riot announced the 30 teams partnered for the 2023 Champions Tour. Following the inclusion of the 2023 LOCK//IN event, Riot announced the location of 2023 Champions as Los Angeles.

To promote the event, on July 31, 2023, Riot released the anthem for the tournament, "Ticking Away". The track features artists Grabbitz and bbno$. In coordination with the track release, Riot hosted events across four LA neighborhoods featuring live music, food and livestreaming tournament matches. Additionally, Riot released a number of videos featuring bbno$ as "The Random".

On July 23rd, the sixteen qualified teams were announced by Riot Games.

Junta de Andalucía was announced as the Global English Broadcast Partner on August 7th.

== Venues ==
Los Angeles and Inglewood were chosen to host the competition. The tournament was held at the Shrine Auditorium and Expo Hall for the majority of the tournament, and at the Kia Forum for the top 4 teams on the final three days.

California, United States
Los Angeles	Inglewood	2023 Valorant Champions is located in the Los Angeles metropolitan area
Shrine Auditorium and Expo Hall	Kia Forum	2023 Valorant Champions is located in the Los Angeles metropolitan area
Shrine Expo Hall in Los Angeles on the opening day of the tournament with spectators	Kia Forum hosts the final three days of the event.	2023 Valorant Champions is located in the Los Angeles metropolitan area

== Qualified teams ==
Sixteen teams qualified for the global crowning event of the circuit, with teams either qualifying through their respective league or through Last Chance Qualifiers. The top 3 teams of each league during the playoffs or Masters Tokyo for EMEA immediately qualified for Champions, while the other 4 teams had to battle it out in the Last Chance Qualifiers in their respective regions (EMEA was given additional spot for Last Chance Qualifier runner-up due to Fnatic had won Masters Tokyo). China, although Valorant not officially released yet, is given 3 special spots to participate via a qualifier of third-party host.

Qualified teams for 2023 Valorant Champions
League	Team	Qualification
EMEA	Fnatic	Top 3 of EMEA teams in Masters Tokyo
EMEA	Team Liquid	Top 3 of EMEA teams in Masters Tokyo
EMEA	FUT Esports	Top 3 of EMEA teams in Masters Tokyo
EMEA	Giants Gaming	EMEA Last Chance Qualifier winner
EMEA	Natus Vincere	EMEA Last Chance Qualifier runner-up
Americas	Evil Geniuses	Americas League top 3
Americas	NRG	Americas League top 3
Americas	LOUD	Americas League top 3
Americas	KRÜ Esports	Americas Last Chance Qualifier winner
Pacific	Paper Rex	Pacific League top 3
Pacific	DRX	Pacific League top 3
Pacific	T1	Pacific League top 3
Pacific	ZETA DIVISION	Pacific Last Chance Qualifier winner
China	Edward Gaming	China Qualifier top 3
China	Bilibili Gaming	China Qualifier top 3
China	FunPlus Phoenix	China Qualifier top 3

== Group stage ==
The group stage took place from August 6 – 13, 2023. All 16 teams were divided into 4 groups of four teams each playing in a GSL-style double-elimination format. Games were held in a best-of-three series. The top 2 teams in each group qualified for the playoffs.

=== Draw Rules ===
16 Teams were drawn into 4 groups of 4 teams. Teams from the same region cannot be placed in the same group. If a team is drawn into the same group as another team from their region, they will be placed in the next valid group with the exception of the EMEA LCQ #2 seed, which was Natus Vincere. Matchups were based on the draw pools, with Pool 1 teams facing Pool 4 teams and Pool 2 teams facing Pool 3 teams in each group. These pools were determined by the performance of teams at Masters Tokyo and the Last Chance Qualifiers.

=== Bracket ===
Teams in bold advanced to the next round. The numbers to the left of each team indicate the team's seeding in its group, and the numbers to the right indicate the number of maps the team won in that match. Teams with map pick/ban choice (i.e., the higher-seeded team or upper-bracket team) are marked by an asterisk.

Note: Times are in the local time of Los Angeles (PDT) (UTC−7).

Group A

Round 1
August 9 12:00 pm
**1**	**Paper Rex**	**2**
4	KRÜ Esports	0
August 9 3:00 pm
**2**	**Edward Gaming**	**2**
3	Giants Gaming	1
Elimination Match
August 11 12:00 pm
4	KRÜ Esports	0
**3**	**Giants Gaming**	**2**

Winner's Match
August 10 6:00 pm
**1**	**Paper Rex**	**2**
2	Edward Gaming	0
Decider Match
August 13 12:00 pm
**2**	**Edward Gaming**	**2**
3	Giants Gaming	0

Qualified
**A1**	**Paper Rex**
**A2**	**Edward Gaming**

Group B

Round 1
August 7 3:00 pm
**1**	**Evil Geniuses**	**2**
4	FunPlus Phoenix	0
August 7 12:00 pm
**2**	**FUT Esports**	**2**
3	T1	0
Elimination Match
August 10 3:00 pm
4	FunPlus Phoenix	0
**3**	**T1**	**2**

Winner's Match
August 8 6:00 pm
**1**	**Evil Geniuses**	**2**
2	FUT Esports	0
Decider Match
August 12 3:00 pm
**2**	**FUT Esports**	**2**
3	T1	0

Qualified
**B1**	**Evil Geniuses**
**B2**	**FUT Esports**

Group C

Round 1
August 8 3:00 pm
**1**	**Fnatic**	**2**
4	ZETA DIVISION	0
August 8 12:00 pm
2	NRG Esports	0
**3**	**Bilibili Gaming**	**2**
Elimination Match
August 11 3:00 pm
4	ZETA DIVISION	0
**2**	**NRG Esports**	**2**

Winner's Match
August 9 3:00 pm
**1**	**Fnatic**	**2**
3	Bilibili Gaming	0
Decider Match
August 13 3:00 pm
**3**	**Bilibili Gaming**	**2**
2	NRG Esports	0

Qualified
**C1**	**Fnatic**
**C2**	**Bilibili Gaming**

Group D

Round 1
August 6 12:00 pm
1	Team Liquid	0
**4**	**Natus Vincere**	**2**
August 6 3:00 pm
**2**	**DRX**	**2**
3	LOUD	1
Elimination Match
August 10 12:00 pm
1	Team Liquid	0
**3**	**LOUD**	**2**

Winner's Match
August 7 6:00 pm
4	Natus Vincere	1
**2**	**DRX**	**2**
Decider Match
August 12 12:00 pm
4	Natus Vincere	1
**3**	**LOUD**	**2**

Qualified
**D1**	**DRX**
**D2**	**LOUD**

== Playoffs stage ==
The Playoffs are a double-elimination tournament that took place from August 16–26, 2022. All matches were a best-of-three series, except for the Lower Bracket Final and the Grand Final, which were a best-of-five series.

=== Qualified teams ===
Eight teams qualified for the double-elimination Playoffs portion of the tournament from the group stage.

Qualified teams for Playoffs
Group	Seed 1	Seed 2
A	Paper Rex	Edward Gaming
B	Evil Geniuses	FUT Esports
C	Fnatic	Bilibili Gaming
D	DRX	LOUD

=== Bracket ===
Teams in bold advanced to the next round. The numbers to the left of each team indicate the team's seeding in the bracket, while the numbers on the right indicate the number of maps the team won in that match. Teams with map pick/ban choice (i.e., the higher-seeded or upper-bracket teams) are marked with an asterisk. In cases where teams have the same seed from groups, a coin is flipped to determine which team gets the map pick/ban choice. The teams that won the coin toss are indicated with two asterisks. For the grand finals, the team who advanced from the upper bracket gets to ban the first two maps and have map pick/ban choice.

Note: Times are in the local time of Los Angeles (PDT) (UTC−7).

Upper Bracket Quarterfinals	Upper Bracket Semifinals	Upper Bracket Final	Grand Final
August 16 12:00 pm
C1	Fnatic	0
August 19 3:00 pm
**D2**	**LOUD**	**2**
D2	LOUD	1
August 16 3:00 pm
**A1**	**Paper Rex**	**2**
**A1**	**Paper Rex**	**2**
August 24 12:00 pm
B2	FUT Esports	0
**A1**	**Paper Rex**	**2**
August 17 12:00 pm
B1	Evil Geniuses	1
**D1**	**DRX**	**2**
August 19 12:00 pm
C2	Bilibili Gaming	0
D1	DRX	0
August 17 3:00 pm
**B1**	**Evil Geniuses**	**2**
**B1**	**Evil Geniuses**	2	August 26 12:00 pm
A2	Edward Gaming	1	A1	Paper Rex	1
**B1**	**Evil Geniuses**	**3**
Lower Bracket Round 1	Lower Bracket Quarterfinals	Lower Bracket Semifinals	Lower Bracket Final
August 20 12:00 pm (Note: The August 20 matches did not feature live audiences due to Hurricane Hilary.)
August 18 12:00 pm	D1	DRX	1	August 25 12:00 pm
**C1**	**Fnatic**	**2**	**C1**	**Fnatic**	**2**	August 24 3:00 pm	**B1**	**Evil Geniuses**	**3**
B2	FUT Esports	0	C1	Fnatic	1	D2	LOUD	2
August 20 3:00 pm	**D2**	**LOUD**	**2**
August 18 3:00 pm	**D2**	**LOUD**	**2**
C2	Bilibili Gaming	1	A2	Edward Gaming	1
**A2**	**Edward Gaming**	**2**

== Prize pool ==
Riot Games raised the prize pool for the 2023 Champions tournament to $2.25 million, an increase from the $1 million of 2022. The winner of Champions received $1 million.

Place	Team	Prize (USD)
1st	Evil Geniuses	$1,000,000
2nd	Paper Rex	$400,000
3rd	LOUD	$250,000
4th	Fnatic	$130,000
5th–6th	DRX	$85,000
5th–6th	Edward Gaming	$85,000
7th–8th	Bilibili Gaming	$50,000
7th–8th	FUT Esports	$50,000
9th–12th	Natus Vincere	$30,000
9th–12th	T1	$30,000
9th–12th	NRG Esports	$30,000
9th–12th	Giants Gaming	$30,000
13th–16th	KRÜ Esports	$20,000
13th–16th	FunPlus Phoenix	$20,000
13th–16th	ZETA DIVISION	$20,000
13th–16th	Team Liquid	$20,000
