= Valorant Masters Madrid 2024 =

Esports tournament in Madrid, Spain

- 2024

Tournament information
- Game: Valorant
- Location: Madrid, Spain
- Date: March 14–24, 2024
- Administrator: Riot Games
- Tournament format(s): Swiss stage (Group stage); Double-elimination (Playoffs)
- Venue: Madrid Arena
- Teams: 8
- Purse: US$500,000

Final positions
- Champions: Sentinels
- Runner-up: Gen.G

Tournament statistics
- Matches played: 16
- Attendance: 12,000
- Finals MVP: Zachary "zekken" Patrone
- Most kills: Zachary "zekken" Patrone (381 kills) (SEN)
- Highest ACS: Zachary "zekken" Patrone (259.5) (SEN)

Valorant Masters Madrid 2024 was a global tournament organized by Riot Games for the first-person shooter game Valorant as part of the Valorant Champions Tour 2024 competitive season. The tournament was held from March 14–24, 2024, in Madrid, Spain. The finalists of each regional league of VCT Kickoffs competed in the first major tournament of the season, which included the three International Leagues (Americas, EMEA, Pacific) and the China League.

Before the finals, an exhibition game was played between Team Spain and Team International to showcase the new agent Clove. Alongside other agents, both teams had Clove (mimi for Team International and mixwell for Team Spain) in their rosters. In that match, Team Spain defeated Team International 13-8.

Americas' Sentinels claimed their second global event title as they defeated Pacific's Gen.G in a five-game championship series, 3–2, to become the first ever two-time Masters champions. Zachary "zekken" Patrone of Sentinels earned the Finals MVP award garnering a 101/85/29 KDA during the series.

== Qualification ==
The winner (seed 1) and the runner-up (seed 2) for all three International Leagues and China League Kickoffs around the world qualified for the first global event of the competitive season of VCT.

Qualified teams
Regions	Kickoffs Winner	Kickoffs Runner-up
Americas	Sentinels	LOUD
EMEA	Karmine Corp	Team Heretics
Pacific	Gen.G	Paper Rex
China	Edward Gaming	FunPlus Phoenix

== Swiss Stage ==
- All eight teams played in the Swiss-system format with three rounds.
  - In round 1, the seed 1 teams of respective league kickoff faced the seed 2 of another region's kick-off league.
  - From round 2 onwards, matchups were determined after each round of play, based on its win-loss record, and teams from the same region could not play each other.
- Teams with two wins advanced to the playoffs, while teams with two losses were eliminated.
- All matches were best-of-three series.

Advance to Playoffs
1–0	Sentinels
0–0	Sentinels	2	Gen.G	Advance to Playoffs
Karmine Corp	2	Karmine Corp	0	LOUD
FunPlus Phoenix	0	Edward Gaming	1	1–1	Paper Rex
Gen.G	2	Gen.G	2	Edward Gaming	0
LOUD	1	LOUD	2
Edward Gaming	2	0–1	Karmine Corp	1
Paper Rex	1	FunPlus Phoenix	0	Paper Rex	2	Eliminated
Sentinels	2	LOUD	2	Edward Gaming
Team Heretics	1	Team Heretics	1	Eliminated	Karmine Corp
Paper Rex	2	FunPlus Phoenix
Team Heretics

== Playoffs ==
- Teams that had a 2–0 win-loss record were seeded against those who had a 2–1 win-loss record in the Swiss stage.
- All matches are a best-of-three series, except the Lower Bracket Final and Grand Final, which were best-of-five series.

All times are in Central European Time, (UTC+1).

Upper Bracket Semifinals
Gen.G	2
Paper Rex	0
Sentinels	2
LOUD	1
Lower Semifinal
Paper Rex	2
LOUD	0

Upper Bracket Final
Gen.G	2
Sentinels	1
Lower Bracket Final
Sentinels	3
Paper Rex	1

Grand Final
Gen.G	2
Sentinels	3

=== Upper Bracket ===
==== Semifinals ====
Semis A	March 21	Gen.G	2	–	0	Paper Rex	Madrid, Spain
	4:00 pm (UTC+1)	Statistics					Madrid Arena
		13	Split			8	
		13	Lotus			9	
			~~Ascent~~				

Semis B	March 21	Sentinels	2	–	1	LOUD	Madrid, Spain
	7:00 pm (UTC+1)	Statistics					Madrid Arena
		13	Split			4	
		12	Icebox			14	
		14	Sunset			12	

==== Final ====
Upper Final	March 22	Gen.G	2	–	1	Sentinels	Madrid, Spain
	4:00 pm (UTC+1)	Statistics					Madrid Arena
		13	Split			5	
		7	Lotus			13	
		13	Breeze			3	

=== Lower Bracket ===
==== Semifinal ====
Lower Semifinal	March 22	Paper Rex	2	–	0	LOUD	Madrid, Spain
	7:00 pm (UTC+1)	Statistics					Madrid Arena
		13	Ascent			11	
		13	Sunset			8	
			~~Bind~~				

==== Final ====
Lower Final	March 23	Sentinels	3	–	1	Paper Rex	Madrid, Spain
	5:00 pm (UTC+1)	Statistics					Madrid Arena
		14	Lotus			12	
		13	Ascent			6	
		5	Split			13	
		13	Sunset			3	
			~~Bind~~				

=== Grand Final ===
Grand Final	March 24	Gen.G	2	–	3	Sentinels	Madrid, Spain
	5:00 pm (UTC+1)	Statistics					Madrid Arena
		13	Breeze			8	
		12	Bind			14	
		13	Ascent			8	
		10	Split			13	
		6	Icebox			13	

== Final rankings ==
Place	Team	Prize pool (USD)
1st	Sentinels	$250,000
2nd	Gen.G	$100,000
3rd	Paper Rex	$65,000
4th	LOUD	$35,000
5th–6th	Edward Gaming	$15,000
5th–6th	Karmine Corp	$15,000
7th–8th	FunPlus Phoenix	$10,000
7th–8th	Team Heretics	$10,000

== Marketing ==
Riot Games revealed the game's 25th agent, Clove, who has a role of Controller, with a show-match between a Spanish and international team showcasing the newest agent's abilities.

As with previous international Valorant Champions Tour events, there were Twitch drops available for all viewers watching the tournament, and a player card released during the grand final of the tournament.
