= 2027 Mid-Season Invitational =

International esports competition

Tournament information
- Sport: League of Legends
- Location: Valencia, Spain
- Administrator: Riot Games
- Venue: Feria Valencia

The 2027 Mid-Season Invitational will be the twelfth iteration of the Mid-Season Invitational (MSI), a Riot Games–organized tournament for League of Legends, a multiplayer online battle arena video game. The tournament will be played in Valencia, Spain.

It will be the second of two Riot Games-organized international esports competitions to be held in Valencia in 2027, with the first being the Valorant Masters Valencia 2027 tournament for Valorant.

Hanwha Life Esports of the League of Legends Champions Korea (LCK) are the defending champions.

== Host selection ==
In a development update video published by Riot Games on 8 January 2025 to begin that year's competitive season, Riot Games announced that MSI 2027 will be held in Europe, with the location to be determined. Valencia was confirmed as the host city during the media day for the 2026 League of Legends World Championship Final in New York City, United States on 13 November 2026.

It will be the fourth time Europe will host MSI after the 2018, 2021, and 2023 editions, and will be the second international League of Legends competition to be held in Spain after staging the quarterfinals and semifinals of the 2019 League of Legends World Championship in Madrid.

== Venue ==
The Feria Valencia was confirmed as the tournament venue on 13 November 2026.

Valencia, Spain
Play-in stage	Bracket stage
Feria Valencia
2027 Mid-Season Invitational is located in Spain

== Qualification ==
The Campeonato Brasileiro de League of Legends (CBLOL), League of Legends Champions Korea (LCK), League of Legends Championship Pacific (LCP), League Championship Series (LCS), League of Legends EMEA Championship (LEC), and League of Legends Pro League (LPL) will send qualified teams each, but the quota distribution has not been determined.
