= Valorant Champions Tour EMEA =

Professional video game competition

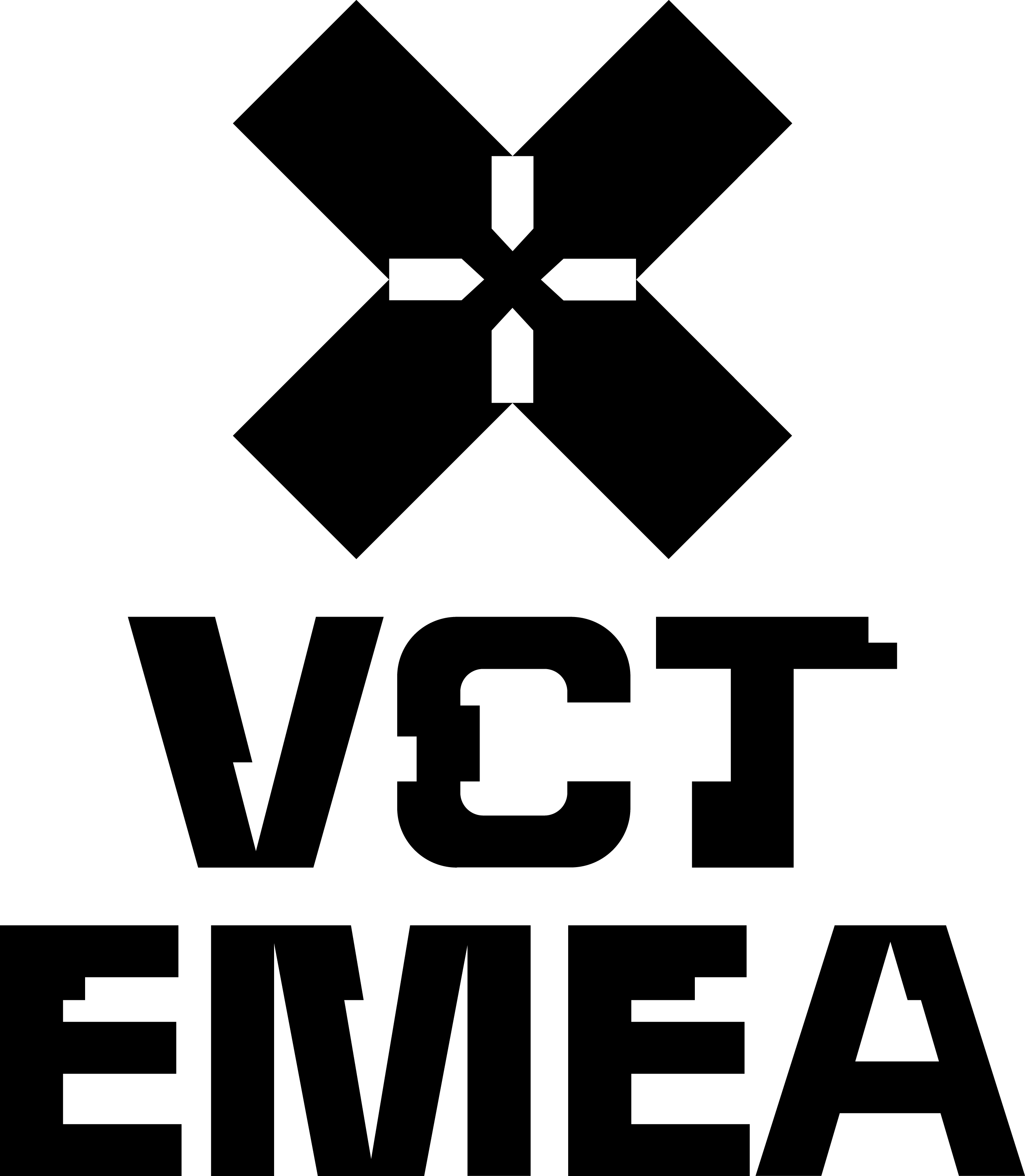
- Game: Valorant
- Founded: 2022; 4 years ago
- First season: 2023
- Organising body: Riot Games
- No. of teams: 8 (partner teams); TBD (non-partner teams)
- Country: Europe, the Middle East and Africa
- Most recent champion: Karmine Corp (2nd title)
- Most titles: Fnatic (3 titles)
- Qualification: Open qualifiers
- International cups: Valorant Masters; Valorant Champions
- Related competitions: VCT Americas; VCT CN; VCT Pacific

Valorant Champions Tour EMEA (VCT EMEA) is one of four territories of the Valorant Champions Tour (VCT), a global competitive esports tournament series organised by the game's developer Riot Games. It consists of teams from the Europe, the Middle East and Africa (EMEA) region, eight of which are partner teams and multiple non-partner teams as of the 2027 season, competing in open qualifiers and regional events throughout the year.

Launched in 2022 as one of three new franchised international leagues, it was one of the seven regions when the VCT was announced in 2020. In line with the VCT's return to an regional open qualifier system in 2027, the territory adopted qualification pathways for Europe, Turkey, and Middle East and North Africa (MENA), serving as qualifiers for both Kickoff and Regional Cups.

VCT EMEA holds three events (Kickoff + Regional Cups) per year that serve as qualifiers for the annual Valorant Masters and Valorant Champions tournaments, respectively. The eight partner teams automatically qualify for Kickoff, but will have to qualify for Cups, Masters, and Champions through the open qualification system.

Teams from VCT EMEA have appeared in four Champions finals, including its maiden title in the tournament's inaugural edition with Ascend. Fnatic is also one of only two teams to have won multiple Masters titles, the other being Sentinels from VCT Americas.

== Qualification ==
=== Overview (2027) ===
Kickoff

- All eight partner teams are guaranteed qualification.
- Four spots are contested through open qualifiers.
  - Two (2) spots reserved for the top two teams of the European qualifiers
  - One (1) slot reserved for the winners of each of the Turkey and MENA qualifiers.

Regional Cups

- Partner teams are not guaranteed qualification.
- All tournament spots are contested through qualification.
- Qualification format for Regional Cups has yet to be determined.

== Partner teams ==
=== Current ===
Riot Games announced on 21 October 2026 the full set of eight VCT EMEA partner teams, alongside those from the other VCT regional leagues. The partner teams comprise of the following:

- BBL Esports (Turkey)
- Fnatic (Europe)
- FUT Esports (Turkey)
- Gentle Mates (Europe)
- Karmine Corp (Europe)
- Team Heretics (Europe)
- Team Liquid (Europe)
- Team Vitality (Europe)

=== Former ===
Prior to the return of the open qualifier system, other partner teams included GIANTX and Natus Vincere from Europe.

== Results ==
As of 2026 Stage 2

Key
†	The team won Valorant Masters in the same season

Year	Tournament	Winners	Runners-up	Third place	Fourth place	Qualified for Valorant Champions				
Year	Tournament	Winners	Runners-up	Third place	Fourth place	Seed 1	Seed 2	Seed 3	Seed 4	Seed 5
2023	EMEA League	Team Liquid	Fnatic †	FUT Esports	Natus Vincere	Fnatic	Team Liquid	FUT Esports	Giants Gaming (Note: Qualified as winner of the Last Chance Qualifier)	Natus Vincere (Note: Qualified as runner-up of Last Chance Qualifier due to Fnatic winning Valorant Masters Tokyo 2023, where the top three EMEA teams qualified for Champions.)
2024	Kickoff	Karmine Corp	Team Heretics	Natus Vincere	Fnatic	Fnatic	Team Vitality	Team Heretics	FUT Esports	—N/a
2024	Stage 1	Fnatic	Team Heretics	FUT Esports	Karmine Corp	Fnatic	Team Vitality	Team Heretics	FUT Esports	—N/a
2024	Stage 2	Fnatic	Team Vitality	Team Heretics	FUT Esports	Fnatic	Team Vitality	Team Heretics	FUT Esports	—N/a
2025	Kickoff	Team Vitality	Team Liquid	Team Heretics	FUT Esports	Team Liquid	GIANTX	Fnatic	Team Heretics	—N/a
2025	Stage 1	Fnatic	Team Heretics	Team Liquid	BBL Esports	Team Liquid	GIANTX	Fnatic	Team Heretics	—N/a
2025	Stage 2	Team Liquid	GIANTX	BBL Esports	Natus Vincere	Team Liquid	GIANTX	Fnatic	Team Heretics	—N/a
2026	Kickoff	BBL Esports	Gentle Mates	Team Liquid	Fnatic	Karmine Corp	Team Liquid	FUT Esports	Team Vitality	—N/a
2026	Stage 1	Team Heretics	Team Vitality	FUT Esports	Eternal Fire	Karmine Corp	Team Liquid	FUT Esports	Team Vitality	—N/a
2026	Stage 2	Karmine Corp	Team Liquid	FUT Esports	Fire Flux Esports	Karmine Corp	Team Liquid	FUT Esports	Team Vitality	—N/a
2027	Kickoff									—N/a
2027	Cup 1									—N/a
2027	Cup 2									—N/a
