= Eternal Fire (esports) =

Turkish esports organization

- Short name: EF
- Sport: Counter-Strike 2 Valorant; PUBG; Brawl Stars; League of Legends
- Founded: 13 August 2021; 4 years ago
- Location: Istanbul, Turkey
- CEO: Furkan Güven
- Partners: Keydrop, Yüzdeyüz Online, Türk Telekom Gameon, PirateSwap.gg
- Website: eternalfire.gg

Eternal Fire is a Turkish esports organization founded on 13 August 2021. The organization has teams competing in Counter-Strike 2 and Valorant. Its Valorant team competes in the VCT EMEA league.

== Counter-Strike ==
Eternal Fire's CS:GO team was announced on 13 August 2021, featuring four of the most notable Turkish players in CS:GO history—woxic, XANTARES, Calyx, and imoRR—and one Jordanian player. Two months later, the Jordanian player, ISSAA, left the team and the organization became a fully Turkish roster. The team attended the Antwerp 2022 Major, but did not advance to the playoff stage. In July 2022, Calyx left the team and was replaced by MAJ3R. A week later, xfl0ud was moved to the inactive lineup and replaced by Ahmet "paz" Karahoca. The move brought the core of Space Soldiers back together.

After failing to qualify for the IEM Rio Major 2022, MAJ3R was removed from the team in October, while xfl0ud was brought back from inactivity. Later that month, paz requested to be benched for personal reasons, while coach Canpolat "hardstyle" Yıldıran was removed by the organisation itself. In early November, AWPer Özgür "woxic" Eker also benched himself, stating that he wanted to continue his career in an international team. Calyx and MAJ3R were brought back to fill in, while Sezgin "Fabre" Kalaycı was appointed as the new coach.

On 18 September 2024 Eternal fire announced their new Brawl Stars roster which consisted of players Ope, GuGu and Mebius. Eternal Fire were qualified for Brawl Stars World Finals 2024 where they finished 9-11th. On 13 December 2024 Mebius left the team.

=== 2025 ===
Eternal Fire had to sell their Counter-Strike team to the Serbia-based esports organization Team Aurora on April 5, 2025, due to sponsor issues and political reasons. As a result, Eternal Fire participated in the PGL Bucharest 2025 tournament under the Team Aurora name with their current CS2 roster on April 6, 2025.

=== Roster ===
Eternal Fire Counter-Strike 2 roster
Players
Coaches

Handle	Name	Nationality
jottAAA	Köklü, Samet	Turkey
regali	Harjău, Iulian	Romania
MisteM	Ries, Gareth	South Africa
imoRR (I)	Karataş, Ömer	Turkey
Calyx (I)	Arkın, Buğra	Turkey
Woro2k (I)	Veletniuk, Volodymyr	Ukraine

Head coach

Yiğit "yT" Özden

Legend:
- (I) Inactive
- (S) Suspended
- Substitute
- (injured) Injury / Illness

Latest roster transaction: 1 July 2026.

== Valorant ==
The Valorant roster of Eternal Fire was announced on 21 April 2024.

On 20 March 2026, Eternal Fire were admitted into the VCT EMEA league following financial issues at ULF Esports.

=== Roster ===
Eternal Fire Valorant roster
Players
Coaches

Handle	Name	Nationality
CyderX	Demir, Caner	Turkey
Izzy	Yılmaz, Baran	Turkey
QutionerX	Dural, Doğukan	Turkey
Anima	Aydin, Uğurcan	Turkey
Brave	Kasırga, Eren	Turkey

Head coach

Tolunay "Jonsyp" Pinarli

Legend:
- (I) Inactive
- (S) Suspended
- Substitute
- (injured) Injury / Illness

Latest roster transaction: 6 April 2025.
