= Valorant Champions Tour Americas =

Professional video game competition

- Game: Valorant
- Founded: 2022; 4 years ago
- First season: 2023
- Organising body: Riot Games
- No. of teams: 8 (partner teams); TBD (non-partner teams)
- Country: Americas
- Most recent champion: 100 Thieves (2nd title)
- Most titles: G2 Esports (4 titles)
- Qualification: Open qualifiers
- International cups: Valorant Masters; Valorant Champions
- Related competitions: VCT CN; VCT EMEA; VCT Pacific

Valorant Champions Tour Americas (VCT Americas) is one of four territories of the Valorant Champions Tour (VCT), a global competitive esports tournament series organised by the game's developer Riot Games. It consists of teams from the Americas region (North America, Brazil, and Latin America), eight of which are partner teams and multiple non-partner teams as of the 2027 season, competing in open qualifiers and regional events throughout the year.

Launched in 2022, it merged the North America, Brazil, and Latin America regions, which were separate when the VCT was announced in 2020, into one franchised international league. In line with the VCT's return to a regional open qualifier system in 2027, the territory adopted qualification pathways for North America, Brazil, and Latin America, serving as qualifiers for both Kickoff and Regional Cups.

VCT Americas holds three events (Kickoff + Regional Cups) per year that serve as qualifiers for the annual Valorant Masters and Valorant Champions tournaments, respectively. The eight partner teams automatically qualify for Kickoff, but will have to qualify for Cups, Masters, and Champions through the open qualification system.

Teams from VCT Americas have won four Champions titles and four Masters tournaments. LOUD, one of the VCT Americas teams, is the first team to win multiple Champions tournaments, having won in 2022 and 2026.

== Qualification ==
=== Overview (2027) ===
Kickoff

- All eight partner teams are guaranteed qualification.
- Four spots are contested through open qualifiers.
  - One (1) spot reserved for the winners of each of the North America, Brazil, and Latin America qualifiers.
    - Latin America qualifiers divided into LATAM North and LATAM South.
  - One (1) spot for the Last Chance Qualifier winner.

Regional Cups

- Partner teams are not guaranteed qualification.
- All tournament spots are contested through qualification.
- Qualification format for Regional Cup has yet to be determined.

== Partner teams ==
=== Current ===
Riot Games announced on 21 October 2026 the full set of eight VCT Americas partner teams, alongside those from the other VCT regional leagues. The partner teams comprise of the following:

- 100 Thieves (North America)
- G2 Esports (North America)
- KRÜ Esports (Latin America)
- Leviatán (Latin America)
- LOUD (Brazil)
- MIBR (Brazil)
- NRG Esports (North America)
- Sentinels (North America)

=== Former ===
Prior to the return of the open qualifier system, other partner teams included Cloud9 and Evil Geniuses from North America, and FURIA from Brazil.

== Results ==
As of 2026 Stage 2

Key
†	The team won Valorant Champions in the same season
†	The team won Valorant Masters in the same season

Year	Tournament	Winners	Runners-up	Third place	Fourth place	Qualified for Valorant Champions			
Year	Tournament	Winners	Runners-up	Third place	Fourth place	Seed 1	Seed 2	Seed 3	Seed 4
2023	Americas League	LOUD	NRG	Evil Geniuses	Cloud9	Evil Geniuses †	NRG	LOUD	KRÜ Esports (Note: Qualified via Last Chance Qualifier)
2024	Kickoff	Sentinels †	LOUD	Evil Geniuses	NRG	Leviatán	G2 Esports	KRÜ Esports	100 Thieves
2024	Stage 1	100 Thieves	G2 Esports	KRÜ Esports	Sentinels	Leviatán	G2 Esports	KRÜ Esports	100 Thieves
2024	Stage 2	Leviatán	G2 Esports	KRÜ Esports	100 Thieves	Leviatán	G2 Esports	KRÜ Esports	100 Thieves
2025	Kickoff	G2 Esports	Sentinels	MIBR	KRÜ Esports	G2 Esports	NRG †	Sentinels	MIBR
2025	Stage 1	G2 Esports	Sentinels	MIBR	Evil Geniuses	G2 Esports	NRG †	Sentinels	MIBR
2025	Stage 2	G2 Esports	NRG	Sentinels	Cloud9	G2 Esports	NRG †	Sentinels	MIBR
2026	Kickoff	FURIA	G2 Esports	NRG	MIBR	100 Thieves	LOUD †	NRG	G2 Esports
2026	Stage 1	G2 Esports	Leviatán †	NRG	100 Thieves	100 Thieves	LOUD †	NRG	G2 Esports
2026	Stage 2	100 Thieves	LOUD	NRG	G2 Esports	100 Thieves	LOUD †	NRG	G2 Esports
2027	Kickoff								
2027	Cup 1								
2027	Cup 2								
