= 2024 Valorant Champions =

Gaming tournament

- 2024

Tournament information
- Game: Valorant
- Location: Seoul and Incheon, South Korea
- Date: August 1–25, 2024
- Administrator: Riot Games
- Venues: 2: COEX Artium (Group Stage and Playoffs Stage); INSPIRE Arena (Top 4 Playoffs + Grand Finals)
- Teams: 16
- Purse: $2,250,000 USD

Final positions
- Champions: Edward Gaming
- Runner-up: Team Heretics
- MVP: Zheng "ZmjjKK" Yongkang (EDG)

The 2024 Valorant Champions was the fourth edition of the Valorant Champions, the world championship esports tournament organized by Riot Games for the first-person shooter game Valorant. The tournament ran from August 1–25, 2024. Seoul, along with Incheon, South Korea hosted the crowning event of Valorant Champions Tour's 2024 competitive season in which the sixteen best teams competed to become the season's world champions.

"Superpower" (stylized in all caps), performed by Julie and Natty of Kiss of Life and Mark Tuan of Got7, was the official theme song for the tournament.

Before the start of the grand final, Valorant's 26th agent and sixth Sentinel, Vyse, was revealed. She would eventually be available for play three days after the conclusion of the tournament.

Evil Geniuses were the defending champions, but failed to qualify after missing the Americas Playoffs and not having enough championship points. Edward Gaming won the championship after beating Team Heretics in the grand final 3–2, resulting in China's first international trophy. Zheng "ZmjjKK" Yongkang from Edward Gaming was named the MVP of the tournament.

== History ==
On February 17, 2024, Riot Games announced that Seoul will play host to the Valorant Champions, the crowning event of the VCT 2024 season.

== Qualified teams ==
Sixteen teams, including twelve teams (seed 1/2/3) that finished in the top three of Stage 2, and four teams (seed 4) that were out of top three but had most Championship Points in season of all three International Leagues (Americas, EMEA, Pacific) and China League, qualified for the global crowning event of the circuit.

(*) Non-partner teams in franchise system

Region	Stage 2 Winner	Stage 2 Runners-up	Stage 2 Third-place	Championship Points
Americas	Leviatán	G2 Esports*	KRÜ Esports	Sentinels
EMEA	Fnatic	Team Vitality	Team Heretics	FUT Esports
Pacific	Gen.G	DRX	Paper Rex	Talon Esports
China	Edward Gaming	FunPlus Phoenix	Trace Esports	Bilibili Gaming

== Venues ==
Seoul and Incheon were chosen to host the competition. The majority of the tournament is being held at the COEX Artium (home of VCT Pacific) in Seoul, and the final three days at the INSPIRE Arena in Incheon.

South Korea
Seoul	Incheon
COEX Artium	INSPIRE Arena
2024 Valorant Champions is located in South Korea

== Group stage ==
- Sixteen teams were drawn into four groups of four teams each. Teams from the same region cannot be placed in the same group.
- Seed 1 team play against seed 4, while seed 2 team play against seed 3 in the opening match.
- Double elimination; all matches are best-of-three.
- The eight teams consisting of the winners and runners-up of each group advance to the Playoff Stage. Remaining teams are eliminated.

=== Group A ===
Opening Match
Match 1 - 2 August
1	Fnatic	2
4	Bilibili Gaming	0
Match 2 - 2 August
2	DRX	2
3	KRÜ Esports	1
Elimination Match
Match 4 - 8 August
L1	Bilibili Gaming	0
L2	KRÜ Esports	2

Winners Match
Match 3 - 6 August
W1	Fnatic	0
W2	DRX	2
Decider Match
Match 5 - 10 August
L3	Fnatic	2
W4	KRÜ Esports	1

Playoffs Qualified
A1	DRX
A2	Fnatic

Opening Match	2 August	Fnatic	2	–	0	Bilibili Gaming	Seoul, South Korea
	20:00 (UTC+9)						COEX Artium
		13	Bind			9	
		13	Lotus			4	
			~~Ascent~~				

Opening Match	2 August	DRX	2	–	1	KRÜ Esports	Seoul, South Korea
	17:00 (UTC+9)						COEX Artium
		2	Haven			13	
		13	Abyss			6	
		13	Bind			6	

Winners Match	6 August	Fnatic	0	–	2	DRX	Seoul, South Korea
	20:00 (UTC+9)						COEX Artium
		11	Abyss			13	
		6	Lotus			13	
			~~Bind~~				

Elimination Match	8 August	Bilibili Gaming	0	–	2	KRÜ Esports	Seoul, South Korea
	20:00 (UTC+9)						COEX Artium
		13	Lotus			9	
		13	Icebox			4	
			~~Sunset~~				

Decider match	10 August	Fnatic	2	–	1	KRÜ Esports	Seoul, South Korea
	20:00 (UTC+9)						COEX Artium
		11	Sunset			13	
		13	Haven			9	
		13	Lotus			5	

=== Group B ===
Opening Match
Match 1 - 1 August
1	Gen.G	2
4	Sentinels	0
Match 2 - 1 August
2	FunPlus Phoenix	1
3	Team Heretics	2
Elimination Match
Match 4 - 8 August
L1	Sentinels	2
L2	FunPlus Phoenix	0

Winners Match
Match 3 - 6 August
W1	Gen.G	1
W2	Team Heretics	2
Decider Match
Match 5 - 10 August
L3	Gen.G	0
W4	Sentinels	2

Playoffs Qualified
B1	Team Heretics
B2	Sentinels

Opening Match	1 August	Gen.G	2	–	0	Sentinels	Seoul, South Korea
	17:00 (UTC+9)						COEX Artium
		13	Haven			8	
		13	Ascent			7	
			~~Abyss~~				

Opening Match	1 August	FunPlus Phoenix	1	–	2	Team Heretics	Seoul, South Korea
	20:00 (UTC+9)						COEX Artium
		12	Abyss			14	
		13	Bind			9	
		13	Lotus			15	

Winners Match	6 August	Gen.G	1	–	2	Team Heretics	Seoul, South Korea
	17:00 (UTC+9)						COEX Artium
		13	Abyss			11	
		11	Lotus			13	
		10	Bind			13	

Elimination Match	8 August	Sentinels	2	–	0	FunPlus Phoenix	Seoul, South Korea
	17:00 (UTC+9)						COEX Artium
		13	Bind			8	
		13	Lotus			5	
			~~Abyss~~				

Decider match	10 August	Gen.G	0	–	2	Sentinels	Seoul, South Korea
	17:00 (UTC+9)						COEX Artium
		9	Lotus			13	
		6	Icebox			13	
			~~Haven~~				

=== Group C ===
Opening Match
Match 1 - 3 August
1	Leviatán	2
4	Talon Esports	0
Match 2 - 3 August
2	Team Vitality	1
3	Trace Esports	2
Elimination Match
Match 4 - 9 August
L1	Talon Esports	0
L2	Team Vitality	2

Winners Match
Match 3 - 7 August
W1	Leviatán	1
W2	Trace Esports	2
Decider Match
Match 5 - 11 August
L3	Leviatán	2
W4	Team Vitality	0

Playoffs Qualified
C1	Trace Esports
C2	Leviatán

Opening Match	3 August	Leviatán	2	–	0	Talon Esports	Seoul, South Korea
	17:00 (UTC+9)						COEX Artium
		13	Bind			11	
		13	Ascent			8	
			~~Sunset~~				

Opening Match	3 August	Team Vitality	1	–	2	Trace Esports	Seoul, South Korea
	20:00 (UTC+9)						COEX Artium
		13	Ascent			15	
		13	Sunset			7	
		7	Bind			13	

Winners Match	7 August	Leviatán	1	–	2	Trace Esports	Seoul, South Korea
	17:00 (UTC+9)						COEX Artium
		10	Bind			13	
		13	Sunset			9	
		5	Ascent			13	

Elimination Match	9 August	Talon Esports	0	–	2	Team Vitality	Seoul, South Korea
	17:00 (UTC+9)						COEX Artium
		6	Lotus			13	
		8	Sunset			13	
			~~Bind~~				

Decider match	11 August	Leviatán	2	–	0	Team Vitality	Seoul, South Korea
	17:00 (UTC+9)						COEX Artium
		14	Icebox			12	
		13	Sunset			4	
			~~Ascent~~				

=== Group D ===
Opening Match
Match 1 - 4 August
1	Edward Gaming	2
4	FUT Esports	0
Match 2 - 4 August
2	G2 Esports	2
3	Paper Rex	0
Elimination Match
Match 4 - 9 August
L1	FUT Esports	0
L2	Paper Rex	2

Winners Match
Match 3 - 7 August
W1	Edward Gaming	1
W2	G2 Esports	2
Decider Match
Match 5 - 11 August
L3	Edward Gaming	2
W4	Paper Rex	1

Playoffs Qualified
D1	G2 Esports
D2	Edward Gaming

Opening Match	4 August	Edward Gaming	2	–	0	FUT Esports	Seoul, South Korea
	20:00 (UTC+9)						COEX Artium
		13	Lotus			9	
		13	Bind			10	
			~~Sunset~~				

Opening Match	4 August	G2 Esports	2	–	0	Paper Rex	Seoul, South Korea
	17:00 (UTC+9)						COEX Artium
		13	Icebox			8	
		13	Lotus			9	
			~~Bind~~				

Winners Match	7 August	Edward Gaming	1	–	2	G2 Esports	Seoul, South Korea
	20:00 (UTC+9)						COEX Artium
		13	Icebox			8	
		11	Haven			13	
		11	Bind			13	

Elimination Match	9 August	FUT Esports	0	–	2	Paper Rex	Seoul, South Korea
	20:00 (UTC+9)						COEX Artium
		11	Sunset			13	
		6	Bind			13	
			~~Lotus~~				

Decider match	11 August	Edward Gaming	2	–	1	Paper Rex	Seoul, South Korea
	20:00 (UTC+9)						COEX Artium
		3	Icebox			13	
		13	Sunset			8	
		13	Lotus			4	

== Playoffs ==
- Eight teams were drawn into a double-elimination bracket.
- The seed 1 team of each group was drawn against the seed 2 team of a different group in Upper Quarterfinals. Teams from same group were not drawn in same bracket until the Upper Final.
- All matches were best-of-three, except for the Lower Bracket Final and the Grand Final, which were best-of-five.

Upper Quarterfinals	Upper Semifinals	Upper Final	Grand Final
Match 1 – 14 August
A1	DRX	0
Match 7 – 17 August
B2	Sentinels	2
W1	Sentinels	1
Match 2 – 14 August
W2	Edward Gaming	2
C1	Trace Esports	0
Match 11 – 23 August
D2	Edward Gaming	2
W7	Edward Gaming	2
Match 3 – 15 August
W8	Leviatán	1
D1	G2 Esports	0
Match 8 – 17 August
C2	Leviatán	2
W3	Leviatán	2
Match 4 – 15 August
W4	Team Heretics	0
B1	Team Heretics	2	Match 14 – 25 August
A2	Fnatic	0	W11	Edward Gaming	3
W13	Team Heretics	2
Lower Round 1	Lower Quarterfinals	Lower Semifinals	Lower Final
Match 9 – 18 August
Match 5 – 16 August	L8	Team Heretics	2	Match 13 – 24 August
L1	DRX	2	W5	DRX	1	Match 12 – 23 August	L11	Leviatán	1
L2	Trace Esports	0	W9	Team Heretics	2	W12	Team Heretics	3
Match 10 – 18 August	W10	Sentinels	1
Match 6 – 16 August	L7	Sentinels	2
L3	G2 Esports	0	W6	Fnatic	1
L4	Fnatic	2

=== Upper Bracket ===
==== Quarterfinals ====
Upper Bracket Quarterfinals	14 August	DRX	0	–	2	Sentinels	Seoul, South Korea
	17:00 (UTC+9)						COEX Artium
		13	Sunset			15	
		8	Haven			13	
			~~Icebox~~				

Upper Bracket Quarterfinals	14 August	Trace Esports	0	–	2	Edward Gaming	Seoul, South Korea
	20:00 (UTC+9)						COEX Artium
		7	Bind			13	
		10	Sunset			13	
			~~Lotus~~				

Upper Bracket Quarterfinals	15 August	G2 Esports	0	–	2	Leviatán	Seoul, South Korea
	17:00 (UTC+9)						COEX Artium
		14	Icebox			16	
		5	Abyss			13	
			~~Haven~~				

Upper Bracket Quarterfinals	15 August	Team Heretics	2	–	0	Fnatic	Seoul, South Korea
	20:00 (UTC+9)						COEX Artium
		13	Lotus			3	
		14	Abyss			12	
			~~Haven~~				

==== Semifinals ====
Upper Bracket Semifinals	17 August	Sentinels	1	–	2	Edward Gaming	Seoul, South Korea
	17:00 (UTC+9)						COEX Artium
		13	Haven			9	
		9	Lotus			13	
		6	Sunset			13	

Upper Bracket Semifinals	17 August	Leviatán	2	–	0	Team Heretics	Seoul, South Korea
	20:00 (UTC+9)						COEX Artium
		15	Icebox			13	
		13	Lotus			10	
			~~Haven~~				

==== Final ====
Upper Bracket Final	23 August	Edward Gaming	2	–	1	Leviatán	Incheon, South Korea
	16:00 (UTC+9)						INSPIRE Arena
		14	Icebox			16	
		13	Lotus			4	
		13	Abyss			11	

=== Lower Bracket ===
==== Round 1 ====
Lower Bracket - Round 1	16 August	DRX	2	–	0	Trace Esports	Seoul, South Korea
	17:00 (UTC+9)						COEX Artium
		13	Lotus			3	
		13	Abyss			5	
			~~Sunset~~				

Lower Bracket - Round 1	16 August	G2 Esports	0	–	2	Fnatic	Seoul, South Korea
	20:00 (UTC+9)						COEX Artium
		3	Haven			13	
		11	Bind			13	
			~~Lotus~~				

==== Quarterfinals ====
Lower Bracket Quarterfinals	18 August	DRX	1	–	2	Team Heretics	Seoul, South Korea
	17:00 (UTC+9)						COEX Artium
		13	Abyss			5	
		5	Sunset			13	
		10	Icebox			13	

Lower Bracket Quarterfinals	18 August	Fnatic	1	–	2	Sentinels	Seoul, South Korea
	20:00 (UTC+9)						COEX Artium
		11	Sunset			13	
		13	Bind			9	
		6	Lotus			13	

==== Semifinal ====
Lower Bracket Semifinals	23 August	Team Heretics	2	–	1	Sentinels	Incheon, South Korea
	19:00 (UTC+9)						INSPIRE Arena
		8	Haven			13	
		13	Icebox			9	
		13	Abyss			7	

==== Final ====
Lower Bracket Final	24 August	Leviatán	1	–	3	Team Heretics	Incheon, South Korea
	16:00 (UTC+9)						INSPIRE Arena
		7	Icebox			13	
		13	Sunset			15	
		13	Abyss			9	
		3	Lotus			13	
			~~Haven~~				

=== Grand Final ===
The winning team from the Upper Bracket Final had the two-map ban advantage in map veto as the lower bracket team.

Grand Final	25 August	Edward Gaming	3	–	2	Team Heretics	Incheon, South Korea
	16:00 (UTC+9)						INSPIRE Arena
		6	Haven			13	
		13	Sunset			4	
		13	Lotus			9	
		11	Bind			13	
		13	Abyss			9	

== Prize pool ==
Riot Games announced that the prize pool for Champions 2024 would remain the same as 2023. The total prize pool was US$2.25 million, and the winner of Champions received US$1 million.

Place	Team	Prize (USD)
1st	Edward Gaming	$1,000,000
2nd	Team Heretics	$400,000
3rd	Leviatán	$250,000
4th	Sentinels	$130,000
5th–6th	DRX	$85,000
5th–6th	Fnatic	$85,000
7th–8th	G2 Esports	$50,000
7th–8th	Trace Esports	$50,000
9th–12th	Gen.G	$30,000
9th–12th	KRÜ Esports	$30,000
9th–12th	Paper Rex	$30,000
9th–12th	Team Vitality	$30,000
13th–16th	Bilibili Gaming	$20,000
13th–16th	FunPlus Phoenix	$20,000
13th–16th	FUT Esports	$20,000
13th–16th	Talon Esports	$20,000
