= 2022 Valorant Champions =

Gaming tournament

Tournament information
- Game: Valorant
- Location: Istanbul, Turkey
- Date: August 31 – September 18
- Administrator: Riot Games
- Tournament format(s): GSL Format (group stage); Double Elimination (playoffs)
- Venue: Volkswagen Arena Istanbul
- Teams: 16
- Purse: $1,000,000 USD

Final positions
- Champions: LOUD
- Runner-up: OpTic Gaming
- MVP: Erick "aspas" Santos (LOUD)

The 2022 Valorant Champions was an esports tournament for the video game Valorant. This was the second edition of the Valorant Champions, the crowning event of the Valorant Champions Tour (VCT) for the 2022 Valorant competitive season. The tournament was held from August 31 to September 18, 2022, in Istanbul, Turkey.

"Fire Again" was the tournament's theme song, put together by Ashnikko.

Acend were the defending champions, but failed to qualify for the event due to not have enough points to qualify directly, then losing to G2 Esports in the EMEA Last Chance Qualifier.

LOUD won the Valorant world championship after defeating OpTic Gaming in the finals by a score of 3–1. Erick "aspas" Santos from LOUD was named the tournament MVP.

== Venues ==
Istanbul was the city chosen to host the competition. The tournament was held at the Volkswagen Arena Istanbul, with spectators from knockout stage.

Istanbul, Turkey
Volkswagen Arena Istanbul
Volkswagen Arena Istanbul on the first day of the knockout stage with spectators	2022 Valorant Champions is located in Istanbul

== Format ==
=== Tournament's spots ===
Sixteen teams qualified for the global crowning event of the circuit, with ten teams qualifying through points earned throughout the season, while the remaining six teams qualified via the Last Chance Qualifiers.

Qualification path	Regions							
Qualification path	EMEA	North America	South America		East Asia			Asia-Pacific (Note: Including teams from sub-regions Indonesia, Malaysia+Singapore, Philippines, Thailand, Vietnam, Taiwan+Hong Kong, Oceania, and South Asia. Teams must first participate in sub-regional qualifiers to qualify for and earn points in the APAC Challangers.)
Qualification path	EMEA	North America	Brazil	Latin America (Note: Latin America has 2 sub-regions LATAM North and LATAM South. Teams must first participate in sub-regional qualifiers to qualify for and earn points in the LATAM Challangers.)	China (Note: Regional Circuit Points was not available for teams from China due to no have Challangers competitions in this season. Teams from China could only compete in East Asia Last Chance Qualifier with teams from Japan and South Korea.)	Japan	S.Korea	Asia-Pacific
Regional Circuit Points (10 spots)	2	2	1	1	0	1	1	2
Last Chance Qualifier (6 spots)	1	1	2		1			1
Total (16 spots)	3	3	4		3			3

=== Qualified teams ===
The following teams qualified for the event:

Qualified teams for 2022 Valorant Champions
Region		Team	Qualification
EMEA		FunPlus Phoenix	EMEA Regional Circuit Points #1
EMEA		Fnatic	EMEA Regional Circuit Points #2
EMEA		Team Liquid	EMEA Last Chance Qualifier winner
North America		OpTic Gaming	NA Regional Circuit Points #1
North America		XSET	NA Regional Circuit Points #2
North America		100 Thieves	NA Last Chance Qualifier winner
Asia-Pacific	MYSG	Paper Rex	APAC Regional Circuit Points #1
Asia-Pacific	Thailand	XERXIA Esports	APAC Regional Circuit Points #2
Asia-Pacific	Indonesia	BOOM Esports	APAC Last Chance Qualifier winner
East Asia	South Korea	DRX	KR Regional Circuit Points #1
East Asia	Japan	ZETA DIVISION	JP Regional Circuit Points #1
East Asia	China	Edward Gaming	EA Last Chance Qualifier winner
South America	Brazil	LOUD	BR Regional Circuit Points #1
South America	Brazil	Furia Esports	SA Last Chance Qualifier runner-up
South America	Latin America	Leviatán	LATAM Regional Circuit Points #1
South America	Latin America	KRÜ Esports	SA Last Chance Qualifier winner

== Group stage ==
The group stage took place August 31 – September 8, 2022. All 16 teams were divided into 4 groups of four teams each playing in a GSL-style double-elimination format. Games were held in a best-of-three series. Only the top 2 teams in each group will qualified for the playoffs.

Group A

Round 1
August 31
Paper Rex	2
Edward Gaming	1
August 31
Leviatán	2
Team Liquid	0
Elimination Match
September 4
Edward Gaming	0
Team Liquid	2

Winner's Match
September 1
Paper Rex	0
Leviatán	2
Decider Match
September 7
Paper Rex	1
Team Liquid	2

Qualified
A1	Leviatán
A2	Team Liquid

Group B

Round 1
September 1
OpTic Gaming	2
BOOM Esports	1
September 1
ZETA DIVISION	0
LOUD	2
Elimination Match
September 4
BOOM Esports	1
ZETA DIVISION	2

Winner's Match
September 2
OpTic Gaming	2
LOUD	1
Decider Match
September 7
LOUD	2
ZETA DIVISION	0

Qualified
B1	OpTic Gaming
B2	LOUD

Group C

Round 1
September 3
FunPlus Phoenix	2
KRÜ Esports	0
September 3
XSET	2
XERXIA Esports	0
Elimination Match
September 5
KRÜ Esports	2
XERXIA Esports	1

Winner's Match
September 5
FunPlus Phoenix	1
XSET	2
Decider Match
September 8
FunPlus Phoenix	2
KRÜ Esports	0

Qualified
C1	XSET
C2	FunPlus Phoenix

Group D

Round 1
September 2
DRX	2
FURIA Esports	0
September 2
Fnatic	1
100 Thieves	2
Elimination Match
September 5
FURIA Esports	1
Fnatic	2

Winner's Match
September 3
DRX	2
100 Thieves	0
Decider Match
September 8
100 Thieves	0
Fnatic	2

Qualified
D1	DRX
D2	Fnatic

== Knockout stage ==
The knockouts were a double-elimination tournament that took place September 9–18, 2022, at Volkswagen Arena, Istanbul. All matches were a best-of-three series, except for the Lower Bracket Final and the Grand Final, which were a best-of-five series.

Upper Bracket Quarterfinals	Upper Bracket Semifinals	Upper Bracket Final	Grand Final
Match 1 – September 9
D1	DRX	2
Match 7 – September 12
C2	FunPlus Phoenix	0
W1	DRX	0
Match 2 – September 9
W2	LOUD	2
A1	Leviatán	0
Match 11 – September 16
B2	LOUD	2
W7	LOUD	2
Match 3 – September 10
W8	OpTic Gaming	0
B1	OpTic Gaming	2
Match 8 – September 12
A2	Team Liquid	1
W3	OpTic Gaming	2
Match 4 – September 10
W4	XSET	1
C1	XSET	2	Match 14 – September 18
D2	Fnatic	0	W11	LOUD	3
W13	OpTic Gaming	1
Lower Bracket Round 1	Lower Bracket Quarterfinals	Lower Bracket Semifinals	Lower Bracket Final
Match 9 – September 13
Match 5 – September 11	L8	XSET	1	Match 13 – September 17
L1	FunPlus Phoenix	2	W5	FunPlus Phoenix	2	Match 12 – September 16	L11	OpTic Gaming	3
L2	Leviatán	0	W9	FunPlus Phoenix	0	W12	DRX	2
Match 10 – September 13	W10	DRX	2
Match 6 – September 11	L7	DRX	2
L3	Team Liquid	0	W6	Fnatic	1
L4	Fnatic	2

== Prize pool ==
Pos	Team	Prize
1st	LOUD	$300,000
2nd	OpTic Gaming	$150,000
3rd	DRX	$110,000
4th	FunPlus Phoenix	$80,000
5th–6th	XSET	$60,000
5th–6th	Fnatic	$60,000
7th–8th	Team Liquid	$40,000
7th–8th	Leviatán	$40,000
9th–12th	100 Thieves	$25,000
9th–12th	KRÜ Esports	$25,000
9th–12th	ZETA Division	$25,000
9th–12th	Paper Rex	$25,000
13th–16th	Furia Esports	$15,000
13th–16th	XERXIA Esports	$15,000
13th–16th	BOOM Esports	$15,000
13th–16th	Edward Gaming	$15,000
