= GiantX =

European esports organisation

GIANTX
- Short name: GX
- Divisions: Esports Virtual Arenas (EVA); League of Legends; Pokémon Champions; Valorant
- Founded: December 14, 2023; 2 years ago
- Based in: London, United Kingdom; Málaga, Spain
- Colors
- CEO: José Ramón Díaz
- Website: giantx.gg

GiantX (stylized as GIANTX) is a European esports organisation with active rosters in League of Legends, Pokémon Champions, Valorant and Esports Virtual Arenas (EVA). The organisation was created as a result of a merger between Excel Esports and Giants Gaming on 14 December 2023.

GIANTX has two League of Legends divisions: one that competes in the League of Legends EMEA Championship (LEC), the top level of professional League of Legends in Europe, the Middle East, and Africa, and an academy team that competes in the Liga Española de League of Legends (LES), the top level of professional League of Legends in Spain. The organisation also fields two players for Pokémon Champions who compete in VGC tournaments, two Valorant teams that competes in the Valorant Champions Tour (VCT) EMEA and Game Changers, and a Esports Virtual Arenas (EVA) team.

== History ==
GIANTX was formed in 15 December 2023 as a result of the merger between Excel Esports and Giants Gaming. Excel CEO Tim Reichert and Giants CEO José Ramón Díaz became co-CEOs of the newly formed organisation. The merger brought together the two organisations' talent, rosters, and content creators, while GIANTX retained their respective competitive operations in the League of Legends EMEA Championship (LEC) and the Valorant Champions Tour (VCT) EMEA leagues.

Prior to the merger, Excel Esports was primarily known for its LEC roster, while Giants Gaming was a partner team in the VCT EMEA. GIANTX retained all employees from both organisations and maintained regional headquarters in London, United Kingdom, and Málaga, Spain, as well as a competitive performance centre in Berlin, Germany. The organisation also retained its existing commercial partners. JRJ Group, which had acquired a majority stake in Excel Esports alongside Toms Capital in 2018, remained the controlling shareholder of the newly formed organisation.

In July 2024, GIANTX acquired AI start-up iTero Gaming in a multi-million-dollar deal. In October, the organisation announced a partnership with Samsung to collaborate on an in-person activation at EGX Comic Con 2024.

== Rosters ==
GIANTX rosters

Esports Virtual Arenas (EVA)
Handle	Name	Nationality
Chrisaser	Cabrera, Christian	Spain
Guzy	Roldán, Víctor Manuel	Spain
JPPro	Tomba, Juan Pablo	Spain
Javcross	Cruz, Javier	Spain
Venom	Servado, Gabriel	Spain

League of Legends (LEC)
Handle	Name	Nationality
Oscarinin	Muñoz, Óscar	Spain
ISMA	Boualem, Ismaïl	Belgium
Jackies	Jeřábek, Adam	Czech Republic
Flakked	Lirola, Víctor	Spain
Jun	Yoon Se-jun	South Korea
Lot (I)	Yıldız, Eren	Turkey
Noah (I)	Oh Hyeon-taek	South Korea

League of Legends (LES)
Handle	Name	Nationality
Th3Antonio	Espinosa, Antonio	Spain
Time	Almeida, Tiago	Portugal
Dyenn	Sánchez, Daniel	Spain
Rayito	Curtet, Michael	Spain
Attila	Carvalho, Amadeu	Portugal

Pokémon Champions
Handle	Name	Nationality
Folagor	Ramírez, Yoel	Spain
Torviv	Medina, Víctor	Spain

Valorant (VCT)
Handle	Name	Nationality
westside	Duda, Miłosz	Poland
ara	Hanceriuc, Eduard-George	Romania
Flickless	Maeckelbergh, Karel	Belgium
neT	Bernet, Michael	United States
Jesse	Čtvrtníček, Adam	Czech Republic

Valorant (GC)
Handle	Name	Nationality
adora	Sasnauskaite, Nadia	Lithuania
Anita	Doykova, Anna	Bulgaria
Anva	Dinçer, Nehir	Turkey
jademwah	Duffy, Jade	Scotland
Jduh	Kondu, Ceyda	Turkey

Legend:
- (I) Inactive
- (S) Suspended
- (L) On loan
- (2W) Two-way player
- Substitute
- (injured) Injury / Illness

Source: GiantX
