= Valorant Champions Tour China =

Professional video game competition

Valorant Champions Tour CN
- Game: Valorant
- Founded: 2023; 3 years ago
- First season: 2024
- Organising body: Riot Games; Tencent
- No. of teams: 8 (partner teams); 2 (visitor teams); TBD (non-partner teams)
- Country: China
- Most recent champion: TYLOO (1st title)
- Most titles: Edward Gaming (5 titles)
- Qualification: Open qualifiers Promotion and relegation
- International cups: Valorant Masters; Valorant Champions
- Related competitions: VCT Americas; VCT EMEA; VCT Pacific

Valorant Champions Tour China (VCT CN) is one of four territories of the Valorant Champions Tour (VCT), a global competitive esports tournament series organised by the game's developer Riot Games. VCT CN is joinly organised by both Riot Games and Tencent, consisting of teams from China, eight of which are partner teams, two as visitor teams, and multiple non-partner teams as of the 2027 season, competing in open qualifiers and regional events throughout the year.

Launched in 2023, it became the VCT's fourth franchised league alongside Americas, EMEA, and Pacific. In line with the VCT's return to a regional open qualifier system in 2027, VCT CN adopted the open qualifiers format while also continuing the visitor team model through promotion and relegation.

VCT CN holds three events (Kickoff + Regional Cups) per year that serve as qualifiers for the annual Valorant Masters and Valorant Champions tournaments, respectively. Unlike the other three international leagues, the eight partner teams and the two visitor teams automatically qualify for Kickoff and Cups.

Teams from VCT CN have won one Champions title, with Edward Gaming winning the 2024 edition, the first Chinese team to do so. While FunPlus Phoenix, one of the teams that participated in VCT CN in 2024, won Valorant Masters Copenhagen 2022, the team was part of VCT EMEA before joining in 2024.

== History ==
Prior to the launch of VCT CN, Riot Games showed favor towards players in China by giving Chinese teams a number of direct slots to participate in both Masters and Champions through third parties competitions in Hong Kong server, instead of having to play through Pacific league. In a June 2023 press conference, Riot Games' COO Whalen Rozelle confirmed that Valorant would launch in China in July under the name 无畏契约 (lit. 'Fearless Contract'), with hopes to launch a VCT league there in 2024. Shortly after in August, Riot announced a regional league for China, raising the number of partnered teams at the time to 40.

== Qualification ==
=== Overview (2027) ===
Kickoff and Regional Cups

- All eight partner teams and two visitor teams are guaranteed qualification.
- Two (2) spots are contested through open qualifiers.
- Qualification method has not yet been determined.

Visitor Team Qualification (VCT Threshold China 2026)

- 13 teams
  - 12 teams start in Week 1 single-elimination bracket, with four teams receiving a bye to the second round.
  - Losing Week 1 teams will advance to Week 2 single-elimination bracket plus one team.
- Winner of each of the Week 1 and Week 2 bracket will be the visitor teams for VCT CN.

== Teams ==
=== Partner teams ===
Riot Games announced on 21 October 2026 the full set of eight VCT CN partner teams, alongside those from the other VCT regional leagues. The partner teams comprise of the following:

- All Gamers
- Bilibili Gaming
- Edward Gaming
- JD Gaming
- Trace Esports
- TYLOO
- Weibo Gaming
- Xi Lai Gaming

=== Visitor teams ===
Two visitor teams are determined through a promotion tournament. The current visitor teams are Dragon Ranger Gaming and Nova Esports, the winners of the first and second week of VCT Threshold China 2026, respectively.

== Results ==
As of 2026 Stage 2

Key
†	The team won Valorant Champions in the same season

Year	Tournament	Winners	Runners-up	Third place	Fourth place	Qualified for Valorant Champions			
Year	Tournament	Winners	Runners-up	Third place	Fourth place	Seed 1	Seed 2	Seed 3	Seed 4
2024	Kickoff	Edward Gaming	FunPlus Phoenix	Dragon Ranger Gaming	Trace Esports	Edward Gaming †	FunPlus Phoenix	Trace Esports	Bilibili Gaming
2024	Stage 1	Edward Gaming	FunPlus Phoenix	Dragon Ranger Gaming	Trace Esports	Edward Gaming †	FunPlus Phoenix	Trace Esports	Bilibili Gaming
2024	Stage 2	Edward Gaming	FunPlus Phoenix	Trace Esports	Bilibili Gaming	Edward Gaming †	FunPlus Phoenix	Trace Esports	Bilibili Gaming
2025	Kickoff	Edward Gaming	Trace Esports	Bilibili Gaming	Dragon Ranger Gaming	Bilibili Gaming	Dragon Ranger Gaming	Edward Gaming	Xi Lai Gaming
2025	Stage 1	Xi Lai Gaming	Bilibili Gaming	Wolves Esports	Edward Gaming	Bilibili Gaming	Dragon Ranger Gaming	Edward Gaming	Xi Lai Gaming
2025	Stage 2	Bilibili Gaming	Dragon Ranger Gaming	Edward Gaming	Xi Lai Gaming	Bilibili Gaming	Dragon Ranger Gaming	Edward Gaming	Xi Lai Gaming
2026	Kickoff	All Gamers	Xi Lai Gaming	Edward Gaming	Bilibili Gaming	TYLOO	JD Gaming	Edward Gaming	Xi Lai Gaming
2026	Stage 1	Edward Gaming	Xi Lai Gaming	Dragon Ranger Gaming	All Gamers	TYLOO	JD Gaming	Edward Gaming	Xi Lai Gaming
2026	Stage 2	TYLOO	JD Gaming	Bilibili Gaming	Nova Esports	TYLOO	JD Gaming	Edward Gaming	Xi Lai Gaming
2027	Kickoff								
2027	Cup 1								
2027	Cup 2								
