= Valorant Champions Tour Pacific =

Professional video game competition

- Game: Valorant
- Founded: 2023; 3 years ago
- First season: 2024
- Organising body: Riot Games
- No. of teams: 8 (partner teams); TBD (non-partner teams)
- Country: Asia-Pacific
- Most recent champion: Global Esports (1st title)
- Most titles: Paper Rex (4 titles)
- Qualification: Open qualifiers
- International cups: Valorant Masters; Valorant Champions
- Related competitions: VCT Americas; VCT CN; VCT EMEA

Valorant Champions Tour Pacific (VCT Pacific) is one of four territories of the Valorant Champions Tour (VCT), a global competitive esports tournament series organised by the game's developer Riot Games. It consists of teams from the Asia-Pacific (APAC) region, eight of which are partner teams and multiple non-partner teams as of the 2027 season, competing in open qualifiers and regional events throughout the year.

Launched in 2022, it merged the Southeast Asia, Korea, and Japan regions, which were separate when the VCT was announced in 2020, into one franchised international league. In line with the VCT's return to a regional open qualifier system in 2027, the territory adopted qualification pathways for eight regions: Korea, Japan, Thailand, Indonesia, Vietnam, Southeast Asia (Philippines, Malaysia, Singapore, rest of Southeast Asia), South Asia, and Oceania, serving as qualifiers for both Kickoff and Regional Cups.

VCT Pacific holds three events (Kickoff + Regional Cups) per year that serve as qualifiers for the annual Valorant Masters and Valorant Champions tournaments, respectively. The eight partner teams automatically qualify for Kickoff, but will have to qualify for Cups, Masters, and Champions through the open qualification system.

Teams from VCT Pacific have appeared in seven Masters finals, including four consecutive Masters titles from Masters Shanghai 2024 to Masters Santiago 2026. Paper Rex is also the only team to have appeared in a Champions finals, having faced Evil Geniuses during the 2023 edition.

== Qualification ==
=== Overview (2027) ===
Kickoff

- All eight partner teams are guaranteed qualification.
- Four spots are contested through open qualifiers.
- Slot allocation and qualification format have yet to be determined.

Regional Cups

- Partner teams are not guaranteed qualification.
- All tournament spots are contested through qualification.
- Qualification format for Regional Cups has yet to be determined.

== Partner teams ==
=== Current ===
Riot Games announced on 21 October 2026 the full set of eight VCT Pacific partner teams, alongside those from the other VCT regional leagues. The partner teams comprise of the following:

- Crazy Raccoon (Japan)
- FULL SENSE (Thailand)
- GAM Esports (Vietnam)
- Gen.G (Korea)
- Paper Rex (Southeast Asia)
- Rex Regum Qeon (Indonesia)
- T1 (Korea)
- ZETA DIVISION (Japan)

=== Former ===
Prior to the return of the open qualifier system, other partner teams included DetonatioN FocusMe (Japan), DRX (Korea), and Team Secret (Southeast Asia).

== Results ==
As of 2026 Stage 2

Key
†	The team won Valorant Masters in the same season

Year	Tournament	Winners	Runners-up	Third place	Fourth place	Qualified for Valorant Champions			
Year	Tournament	Winners	Runners-up	Third place	Fourth place	Seed 1	Seed 2	Seed 3	Seed 4
2023	Pacific League	Paper Rex	DRX	T1	Gen.G	Paper Rex	DRX	T1	ZETA DIVISION (Note: Qualified via Last Chance Qualifier)
2024	Kickoff	Gen.G	Paper Rex	T1	DRX	Gen.G	DRX	Paper Rex	Talon Esports
2024	Stage 1	Paper Rex	Gen.G †	T1	DRX	Gen.G	DRX	Paper Rex	Talon Esports
2024	Stage 2	Gen.G	DRX	Paper Rex	Talon Esports	Gen.G	DRX	Paper Rex	Talon Esports
2025	Kickoff	DRX	T1 †	Gen.G	Talon Esports	Paper Rex	Rex Regum Qeon	T1	DRX
2025	Stage 1	Rex Regum Qeon	Gen.G	Paper Rex †	DRX	Paper Rex	Rex Regum Qeon	T1	DRX
2025	Stage 2	Paper Rex	Rex Regum Qeon	Talon Esports	T1	Paper Rex	Rex Regum Qeon	T1	DRX
2026	Kickoff	Nongshim RedForce †	T1	Paper Rex	Rex Regum Qeon	Global Esports	Nongshim RedForce	Paper Rex	T1
2026	Stage 1	Paper Rex	FULL SENSE	Global Esports	T1	Global Esports	Nongshim RedForce	Paper Rex	T1
2026	Stage 2	Global Esports	Nongshim RedForce	T1	VARREL	Global Esports	Nongshim RedForce	Paper Rex	T1
2027	Kickoff								
2027	Cup 1								
2027	Cup 2								
