= 2026 Valorant Champions =

6th competition of Valorant Champions

Tournament information
- Sport: Valorant
- Location: Shanghai, China
- Date: September 24 – October 18
- Administrator: Riot Games
- Venues: 2: Jing'an Sports Center (Group Stage and Playoffs Stage); Mercedes-Benz Arena (Top 4 Playoffs + Grand Finals)
- Teams: 16
- Purse: US$2,250,000

Final positions
- Champions: LOUD
- Runner-up: Team Vitality
- MVP: Roberto "erde" Lobos (LOUD)

The 2026 Valorant Champions (Chinese: 2026无畏契约全球冠军赛) was an esports tournament for the first-person tactical hero shooter video game Valorant. It was the sixth iteration of Valorant Champions, the world championship tournament of the Valorant Champions Tour (VCT) organised by the game's developer, Riot Games. The tournament was held in Shanghai, China.

It was China's first hosting of the tournament, the second international Valorant competition to be held both in the country and in Shanghai, and the final Champions tournament in the franchise era, as the VCT will return to an open qualifier format in 2027.

NRG were the defending champions heading into the event, but were subsequently eliminated in the playoffs by 100 Thieves. In the final, LOUD from the Americas defeated Team Vitality from EMEA with a 3–1 scoreline to win its second Champions title, becoming the first organization in Valorant history to do so, having previously won the 2022 edition.

== Host selection and venues ==
On 1 August 2025, Riot Games announced that the 2026 edition of Champions would take place in Shanghai, China. This was the second time Shanghai hosted a Valorant's global event after Valorant Masters Shanghai 2024, and the fifth Riot-organized international event, having previously hosted three editions of the League of Legends World Championship.

Two venues in Shanghai were used for the tournament: the Jing'an Sports Center and the Mercedes-Benz Arena, the latter of which hosted Valorant Masters Shanghai 2024 and the quarterfinals and semifinals of the 2025 League of Legends World Championship.

Shanghai, China
Group Stage and Playoffs	Final Four
Jing'an Sports Center	Mercedes-Benz Arena
Capacity: 5,600	Capacity: 18,000
2026 Valorant Champions is located in China

== Qualification ==
Sixteen teams, including eight teams (seed 1/2) that finished in the top two of Stage 2, and eight teams (seed 3/4) that were out of top two but had most Championship Points in season of all three International Leagues (Americas, EMEA, Pacific) and China League, qualified for the event.

The teams that qualified for the event are:

Region	Stage 2 Winner	Stage 2 Runners-up	Championship Points #1	Championship Points #2
Americas	100 Thieves	LOUD	NRG	G2 Esports*
EMEA	Karmine Corp	Team Liquid	FUT Esports	Team Vitality
Pacific	Global Esports	Nongshim RedForce*	Paper Rex	T1
China	TYLOO	JD Gaming	Edward Gaming	Xi Lai Gaming*

(*) Non-partner teams in franchise system

== Group stage ==
The group stage was held from 24 September to 4 October at the Jing'an Sports Center in Shanghai, and matches began at 17:00 CST (UTC+8) Sixteen teams were drawn into four GSL-style double-elimination groups of four teams each, with all matches played in best-of-threes. Teams from the same region cannot be placed in the same group. Seed 1 team play against Seed 4, while Seed 2 team play against Seed 3 in the opening match. The top two teams in each group advanced to the playoffs, while the remaining teams were eliminated.

=== Draw ===
The draw for the group stage was held on 6 September 2026 in São Paulo, Brazil after the VCT Americas Stage 2 finals. In each group, no same regions teams were allowed. Teams were divided into the following pools based on their seeding from their respective regions:

Pool 1 (#1 Seeds)

- 100 Thieves
- Karmine Corp
- Global Esports
- TYLOO

Pool 2 (#2 Seeds)

- LOUD
- Team Liquid
- Nongshim RedForce
- JD Gaming

Pool 3 (#3 Seeds)

- NRG
- FUT Esports
- Paper Rex
- Edward Gaming

Pool 4 (#4 Seeds)

- G2 Esports
- Team Vitality
- T1
- Xi Lai Gaming

=== Group A ===
Opening Match
1	100 Thieves	2
4	T1	0
2	JD Gaming	0
3	FUT Esports	2
Elimination Match
L1	T1	2
L2	JD Gaming	1

Winners Match
W1	100 Thieves	2
W2	FUT Esports	0
Decider Match
L3	FUT Esports	0
W4	T1	2

Playoffs Qualified
A1	100 Thieves
A2	T1

Source: Valorant Esports

Opening Match	27 September	100 Thieves	2	–	0	T1	Shanghai, China
	17:00 (UTC+8)						Jing'an Sports Center
		13	Summit			8	
		13	Ascent			9	
			~~Sunset~~				

Opening Match	27 September	JD Gaming	0	–	2	FUT Esports	Shanghai, China
	17:00 (UTC+8)						Jing'an Sports Center
		1	Ascent			13	
		10	Summit			13	
			~~Split~~				

Winners Match	30 September	100 Thieves	2	–	0	FUT Esports	Shanghai, China
	20:00 (UTC+8)						Jing'an Sports Center
		13	Split			5	
		13	Lotus			10	
			~~Sunset~~				

Elimination Match	2 October	T1	2	–	1	JD Gaming	Shanghai, China
	20:00 (UTC+8)						Jing'an Sports Center
		13	Lotus			11	
		3	Abyss			13	
		13	Haven			5	

Decider Match	4 October	FUT Esports	0	–	2	T1	Shanghai, China
	20:00 (UTC+8)						Jing'an Sports Center
		10	Sunset			13	
		10	Ascent			13	
			~~Summit~~				

=== Group B ===
Opening Match
1	Global Esports	1
4	Team Vitality	2
2	LOUD	2
3	Edward Gaming	0
Elimination Match
L1	Global Esports	2
L2	Edward Gaming	0

Winners Match
W1	Team Vitality	2
W2	LOUD	0
Decider Match
L3	LOUD	2
W4	Global Esports	0

Playoffs Qualified
A1	Team Vitality
A2	LOUD

Source: Valorant Esports

Opening Match	26 September	Global Esports	1	–	2	Team Vitality	Shanghai, China
	17:00 (UTC+8)						Jing'an Sports Center
		10	Abyss			13	
		13	Ascent			9	
		11	Summit			13	

Opening Match	26 September	LOUD	2	–	0	Edward Gaming	Shanghai, China
	20:00 (UTC+8)						Jing'an Sports Center
		13	Lotus			8	
		13	Summit			5	
			~~Sunset~~				

Winners Match	30 September	Team Vitality	2	–	0	LOUD	Shanghai, China
	17:00 (UTC+8)						Jing'an Sports Center
		13	Ascent			7	
		19	Summit			17	
			~~Lotus~~				

Elimination Match	2 October	Global Esports	2	–	0	Edward Gaming	Shanghai, China
	17:00 (UTC+8)						Jing'an Sports Center
		13	Summit			5	
		13	Sunset			6	
			~~Lotus~~				

Decider Match	4 October	LOUD	2	–	0	Global Esports	Shanghai, China
	17:00 (UTC+8)						Jing'an Sports Center
		13	Split			8	
		13	Sunset			9	
			~~Abyss~~				

=== Group C ===
Opening Match
1	TYLOO	0
4	G2 Esports	2
2	Team Liquid	1
3	Paper Rex	2
Elimination Match
L1	TYLOO	1
L2	Team Liquid	2

Winners Match
W1	G2 Esports	1
W2	Paper Rex	2
Decider Match
L3	G2 Esports	2
W4	Team Liquid	0

Playoffs Qualified
A1	Paper Rex
A2	G2 Esports

Source: Valorant Esports

Opening Match	24 September	Team Liquid	1	–	2	Paper Rex	Shanghai, China
	17:00 (UTC+8)						Jing'an Sports Center
		4	Ascent			13	
		13	Haven			7	
		10	Lotus			13	

Opening Match	24 September	TYLOO	0	–	2	G2 Esports	Shanghai, China
	20:00 (UTC+8)						Jing'an Sports Center
		6	Lotus			13	
		3	Sunset			13	
			~~Haven~~				

Winners Match	29 September	Paper Rex	2	–	1	G2 Esports	Shanghai, China
	17:00 (UTC+8)						Jing'an Sports Center
		9	Split			13	
		13	Haven			11	
		13	Lotus			9	

Elimination Match	1 October	Team Liquid	2	–	1	TYLOO	Shanghai, China
	17:00 (UTC+8)						Jing'an Sports Center
		13	Split			8	
		7	Summit			13	
		13	Lotus			2	

Decider Match	3 October	G2 Esports	2	–	0	Team Liquid	Shanghai, China
	17:00 (UTC+8)						Jing'an Sports Center
		13	Split			10	
		13	Abyss			7	
			~~Ascent~~				

=== Group D ===
Opening Match
1	Karmine Corp	2
4	Xi Lai Gaming	0
2	Nongshim RedForce	0
3	NRG	2
Elimination Match
L1	Xi Lai Gaming	0
L2	Nongshim RedForce	2

Winners Match
W1	Karmine Corp	1
W2	NRG	2
Decider Match
L3	Karmine Corp	1
W4	Nongshim RedForce	2

Playoffs Qualified
A1	NRG
A2	Nongshim RedForce

Source: Valorant Esports

Opening Match	25 September	Nongshim RedForce	0	–	2	NRG	Shanghai, China
	17:00 (UTC+8)						Jing'an Sports Center
		5	Lotus			13	
		13	Split			7	
			~~Sunset~~				

Opening Match	25 September	Karmine Corp	2	–	0	Xi Lai Gaming	Shanghai, China
	17:00 (UTC+8)						Jing'an Sports Center
		13	Sunset			3	
		13	Abyss			6	
			~~Ascent~~				

Winners Match	29 September	NRG	2	–	1	Karmine Corp	Shanghai, China
	20:00 (UTC+8)						Jing'an Sports Center
		7	Ascent			13	
		13	Summit			11	
		13	Haven			9	

Elimination Match	1 October	Nongshim RedForce	2	–	0	Xi Lai Gaming	Shanghai, China
	20:00 (UTC+8)						Jing'an Sports Center
		13	Summit			11	
		13	Sunset			11	
			~~Abyss~~				

Decider Match	3 October	Karmine Corp	1	–	2	Nongshim RedForce	Shanghai, China
	20:00 (UTC+8)						Jing'an Sports Center
		13	Sunset			9	
		5	Summit			13	
		6	Haven			13	

== Playoffs ==
Matches from the upper quarterfinals until the lower quarterfinals were held at the Jing'an Sports Center, while matches from the upper final until the grand final were held at the Mercedes-Benz Arena; both venues in Shanghai. Eight teams were drawn into a double-elimination bracket, where the first seed team of each group was drawn against the second seed team of a different group in Upper Quarterfinals. Teams from the same group were not drawn in the same bracket until the Upper Final. All matches were best-of-three, except for the Lower Bracket Final and the Grand Final, which were best-of-five. Matches began at 17:00 CST (UTC+8), except for the lower final (15:00 CST) and the grand final (14:00 CST).

=== Qualified teams ===
Eight teams qualified for the playoff portion of the tournament from the swiss stage:

Group	Winner	Runner-up
A	100 Thieves	T1
B	Team Vitality	LOUD
C	Paper Rex	G2 Esports
D	NRG	Nongshim RedForce

=== Bracket ===
Upper Quarterfinals	Upper Semifinals	Upper Final	Grand Final
Match 1 – 7 October
D1	NRG	2
Match 7 – 10 October
A2	T1	0
W1	NRG	1
Match 2 – 7 October
W2	LOUD	2
C1	Paper Rex	0
Match 11 – 16 October
B2	LOUD	2
W7	LOUD	2
Match 3 – 8 October
W8	Team Vitality	1
A1	100 Thieves	0
Match 8 – 10 October
C2	G2 Esports	2
W3	G2 Esports	0
Match 4 – 8 October
W4	Team Vitality	2
B1	Team Vitality	2	Match 14 – 18 October
D2	Nongshim RedForce	1	W11	LOUD	3
W13	Team Vitality	1
Lower Round 1	Lower Quarterfinals	Lower Semifinals	Lower Final
Match 9 – 11 October
Match 5 – 9 October	L8	G2 Esports	2	Match 13 – 17 October
L1	T1	2	W5	T1	1	Match 12 – 16 October	L11	Team Vitality	3
L2	Paper Rex	1	W9	G2 Esports	1	W12	100 Thieves	1
Match 10 – 11 October	W10	100 Thieves	2
Match 6 – 9 October	L7	NRG	0
L3	100 Thieves	2	W6	100 Thieves	2
L4	Nongshim RedForce	1

Source: Valorant Esports

==== Upper Bracket ====
Upper Quarterfinal 1	7 October	NRG	2	–	0	T1	Shanghai, China
	17:00 (UTC+8)						Jing'an Sports Center
		13	Lotus			11	
		13	Summit			7	
			~~Abyss~~				

Upper Quarterfinal 2	7 October	Paper Rex	0	–	2	LOUD	Shanghai, China
	20:00 (UTC+8)						Jing'an Sports Center
		9	Split			13	
		13	Sunset			15	
			~~Summit~~				

Upper Quarterfinal 3	8 October	100 Thieves	0	–	2	G2 Esports	Shanghai, China
	17:00 (UTC+8)						Jing'an Sports Center
		5	Abyss			13	
		11	Ascent			13	
			~~Summit~~				

Upper Quarterfinal 4	8 October	Team Vitality	2	–	1	Nongshim RedForce	Shanghai, China
	20:00 (UTC+8)						Jing'an Sports Center
		13	Split			8	
		4	Abyss			13	
		14	Haven			12	

Upper Semifinal 1	10 October	NRG	1	–	2	LOUD	Shanghai, China
	17:00 (UTC+8)						Jing'an Sports Center
		9	Haven			13	
		13	Sunset			10	
		3	Summit			13	

Upper Semifinal 2	10 October	G2 Esports	0	–	2	Team Vitality	Shanghai, China
	20:00 (UTC+8)						Jing'an Sports Center
		11	Abyss			13	
		4	Split			13	
			~~Ascent~~				

Upper Final	16 October	Team Vitality	1	–	2	LOUD	Shanghai, China
	14:00 (UTC+8)						Mercedes-Benz Arena
		13	Lotus			8	
		5	Summit			13	
		11	Haven			13	

==== Lower Bracket ====
Lower Round 1 Match 1	9 October	T1	2	–	1	Paper Rex	Shanghai, China
	17:00 (UTC+8)						Jing'an Sports Center
		13	Lotus			7	
		6	Ascent			13	
		13	Summit			11	

Lower Round 1 Match 2	9 October	100 Thieves	2	–	1	Nongshim RedForce	Shanghai, China
	20:00 (UTC+8)						Jing'an Sports Center
		13	Summit			5	
		9	Sunset			13	
		13	Ascent			1	

Lower Quarterfinal 1	11 October	NRG	0	–	2	100 Thieves	Shanghai, China
	17:00 (UTC+8)						Jing'an Sports Center
		12	Sunset			14	
		4	Haven			13	
			~~Summit~~				

Lower Quarterfinal 2	11 October	G2 Esports	2	–	1	T1	Shanghai, China
	20:00 (UTC+8)						Jing'an Sports Center
		13	Lotus			11	
		10	Abyss			13	
		13	Ascent			6	

Lower Semifinal	16 October	100 Thieves	2	–	1	G2 Esports	Shanghai, China
	17:00 (UTC+8)						Mercedes-Benz Arena
		10	Lotus			13	
		13	Ascent			10	
		13	Summit			7	

Lower Final	17 October	Team Vitality	3	–	1	100 Thieves	Shanghai, China
	15:00 (UTC+8)						Mercedes-Benz Arena
		5	Split			13	
		13	Summit			10	
		13	Lotus			11	
		13	Ascent			9	
			~~Haven~~				

==== Final ====
Grand Final	18 October	LOUD	3	–	1	Team Vitality	Shanghai, China
	14:00 (UTC+8)						Mercedes-Benz Arena
		13	Summit			11	
		8	Lotus			13	
		13	Sunset			5	
		13	Haven			10	
			~~Abyss~~				

== Final standings ==
Riot Games announced that the prize pool for Champions 2026 would remain the same as the last three editions. The total prize pool was US$2,250,000, and the winner of Champions received US$1,000,000.

Place	Team	Prize (USD)
1st	LOUD	$1,000,000
2nd	Team Vitality	$400,000
3rd	100 Thieves	$250,000
4th	G2 Esports	$130,000
5th–6th	T1	$85,000
5th–6th	NRG	$85,000
7th–8th	Nongshim RedForce	$50,000
7th–8th	Paper Rex	$50,000
9th–12th	FUT Esports	$30,000
9th–12th	Global Esports	$30,000
9th–12th	Team Liquid	$30,000
9th–12th	Karmine Corp	$30,000
13th–16th	JD Gaming	$20,000
13th–16th	Edward Gaming	$20,000
13th–16th	TYLOO	$20,000
13th–16th	Xi Lai Gaming	$20,000

== Marketing ==
=== Official song ===
"If The Sun Burns Out Tonight" was the tournament's theme song, performed by Grabbitz, Oli Sykes, and Courtney LaPlante. The song was released on 16 September 2026.

=== Showmatch ===
Before the lower bracket finals, a showmatch took place between Team Alpha (consisting of Aijiang, Gus, whzy, Hanghang, and Karry) and Team Omega (consisting of TenZ, Athena of Fifty Fifty, Keshi, OhnePixel, and Dabin). Team Alpha won the showmatch 13–11.

=== In-game ===
On the day of the grand finals, Valorant's 31st agent, Hush, hailing from Guangdong, was revealed. She will be available to play on 28 October, ten days after the tournament's conclusion.
