= 2026 First Stand Tournament =

League of Legends esports tournament

Tournament information
- Sport: League of Legends
- Location: Brazil
- Dates: March 16–22
- Administrator: Riot Games
- Host: São Paulo
- Venue: 1 (in 1 host city)
- Teams: 8
- Purse: US$1,000,000

Final positions
- Champion: Bilibili Gaming
- Runner-up: G2 Esports
- MVP: Chen "Bin" Zebin (Bilibili Gaming)

The 2026 First Stand Tournament was the second First Stand Tournament (FST) – a League of Legends tournament organized by publisher Riot Games at the conclusion of the first split in the current competitive calendar of the game's professional esports scene. The tournament was held in São Paulo, Brazil from 16 to 22 March 2026, featuring eight teams, and was the second international League of Legends competition to be hosted in Brazil after the 2017 Mid-Season Invitational.

Hanwha Life Esports of the League of Legends Champions Korea (LCK) were the reigning champions, but failed to qualify for the event following their elimination from the LCK Cup after the group stage.

Bilibili Gaming of China's League of Legends Pro League (LPL) won the tournament by defeating League of Legends EMEA Championship (LEC) representatives G2 Esports, with a score of 3-1 in the final, marking the first international title for the LPL since the 2023 Mid-Season Invitational and BLG's first as an organization. It also marked the first international event since MSI 2023 to be won by a team outside of the LCK, after the league's streak of six consecutive international titles dating back to the 2023 League of Legends World Championship ended.

== Qualification ==
Unlike the inaugural edition in 2025, the tournament featured eight teams. Two teams each from the League of Legends Champions Korea (LCK) and League of Legends Pro League (LPL) qualified by finishing as finalists of their respective splits, while one team from each of the other major regions, the League of Legends EMEA Championship (LEC), League Championship Series (LCS), Campeonato Brasileiro de League of Legends (CBLOL), and the League of Legends Championship Pacific (LCP), qualified through winning their respective splits. This was the first international League of Legends tournament since the 2024 World Championship to feature representatives from the LCS and CBLOL, as both leagues were reinstated after the discontinuation of the League of Legends Championship of The Americas (LTA) in 2025.

=== Qualified teams ===
Gen.G of the LCK was the first team to qualify for the tournament on 21 February 2026, with BNK FearX securing their spot a week later on 28 February to complete the league's two representatives. Secret Whales of the LCP, G2 Esports of the LEC, LOUD of the CBLOL, and LYON of the LCS, advanced to the tournament on the same day on 1 March. Bilibili Gaming of the LPL qualified on 4 March, with JD Gaming following suit on 7 March to complete the qualified teams.

It was the first appearance in an international League of Legends competition for BNK FearX, and the first international tournament appearance for JD Gaming since the 2023 World Championship, and the first for LYON since competing as Movistar R7 from the now-defunct Liga Latinoamérica (LLA) at the 2024 World Championship, making its first international stint under the LCS. In addition, this was also the first international League of Legends tournament without any teams from Taiwan since the Season 1 World Championship.

Region	League	Path	Team
Brazil; Southern Latin America	CBLOL	CBLOL Cup champion	LOUD
South Korea	LCK	LCK Cup finalists	Gen.G
South Korea	LCK	LCK Cup finalists	BNK FearX
Asia-Pacific	LCP	Split 1 champion	Secret Whales
North America; Northern Latin America	LCS	Lock-In Tournament winner	LYON
EMEA	LEC	LEC Versus winner	G2 Esports
China	LPL	Split 1 finalists	Bilibili Gaming
China	LPL	Split 1 finalists	JD Gaming

== Venue ==
Brazil was chosen to host the tournament on 8 January 2025 in a development update video published by Riot Games to begin the 2025 competitive season. São Paulo was revealed as the host city on 5 November 2025 alongside an announcement of the 2026 CBLOL season's season structure and format. During the media day for the 2025 League of Legends World Championship final in Chengdu, China two days later on 7 November 2025, the Riot Games Arena in São Paulo was confirmed as the tournament venue.

The decision to host the tournament at the 140-capacity venue, which is smaller than the 450-seater LoL Park in Seoul (which hosted the 2025 First Stand Tournament) and the two Riot Games Arenas in Los Angeles (300) and Berlin (210), later gained criticism by several fans. In response, Chris Greeley, the head of League of Legends esports, stated that having FST hosted in regional league studios allows for flexibility and experimentation with the format and schedule that isn't possible with the later international events. Greeley also stated that the event's purpose in the competitive calendar will be reviewed for 2027 with more details to be announced later in 2026. This eventually led to the reveal of First Stand: All In for the 2027 tournament, billed to be the largest tournament in League esports history.

São Paulo, Brazil
Riot Games Arena
Capacity: 140
2026 First Stand Tournament (Brazil)

== Format ==
All matches in the tournament across both the group stage and knockout stage were best-of-five series.

All eight teams began in the group stage and were divided in two GSL-style double-elimination groups, where the two teams in each group who earn two wins advanced to the knockout stage. The knockout stage was a single-elimination bracket and consisted of two Semifinals and a Final. The winner of the Final was crowned FST champion and gave their region's two representatives automatic advancement or byes to the 2026 Mid-Season Invitational's Bracket Stage. As with the previous competitive season, Fearless Draft was implemented.

== Draw ==
The draw for the group stage took place on 8 March 2026 in Suzhou, China after the LPL Split 1 finals.

Group A	Group B
Bilibili Gaming	Gen.G
G2 Esports	LYON
Secret Whales	LOUD
BNK FearX	JD Gaming

== Group stage ==
- Date and time: March 16–20, begins at 10:00 BRT (13:00 UTC)
- Eight teams were drawn into four groups of four teams each. Teams from the same region cannot be placed in the same group.
- Double elimination; all matches are best-of-five

=== Group A ===
Opening Matches
March 16, 10:00 BRT
Bilibili Gaming	3
BNK FearX	2
March 16, 15:00 BRT
G2 Esports	3
Secret Whales	0
Knockout Match
March 18, 15:00 BRT
BNK FearX	3
Secret Whales	0

Winners Match
March 18, 10:00 BRT
Bilibili Gaming	3
G2 Esports	0
Decider Match
March 20, 10:00 BRT
G2 Esports	3
BNK FearX	0

Playoffs Qualified
Bilibili Gaming
G2 Esports

Source: LoL Esports

Opening Match	16 March	Bilibili Gaming	3	–	2	BNK FearX	São Paulo, Brazil
	10:00 (UTC−3)						Riot Games Arena
		K/D/A: 29/9/62; Gold: 66.6K; Turrets: 9 Drakes: 2 Elder Dragons: 0 Barons: 2 Rift Heralds: 1 Voidgrubs: 1	Game 1; 29:38; BLG leads series 1–0			K/D/A: 9/29/20; Gold: 54.7K; Turrets: 1 Drakes: 2 Elder Dragons: 0 Barons: 0 Rift Heralds: 0 Voidgrubs: 0	
		K/D/A: 11/13/22; Gold: 49.9K; Turrets: 2 Drakes: 1 Elder Dragons: 0 Barons: 1 Rift Heralds: 1 Voidgrubs: 1	Game 2; 26:10; Series tied 1–1			K/D/A: 13/11/34; Gold: 53.2K; Turrets: 7 Drakes: 3 Elder Dragons: 0 Barons: 0 Rift Heralds: 0 Voidgrubs: 2	
		K/D/A: 17/23/34; Gold: 65.9K; Turrets: 3 Drakes: 1 Elder Dragons: 0 Barons: 0 Rift Heralds: 1 Voidgrubs: 0	Game 3; 33:06; BFX leads series 2–1			K/D/A: 23/17/49; Gold: 69.0K; Turrets: 9 Drakes: 3 Elder Dragons: 0 Barons: 1 Rift Heralds: 0 Voidgrubs: 3	
		K/D/A: 20/4/51; Gold: 56.5K; Turrets: 10; Drakes: 3 Elder Dragons: 0 Barons: 1 Rift Heralds: 1 Voidgrubs: 3	Game 4; 25:23; Series tied 2–2			K/D/A: 4/20/8; Gold: 43.1K; Turrets: 2 Drakes: 0 Elder Dragons: 0 Barons: 0 Rift Heralds: 0 Voidgrubs: 0	
		K/D/A: 25/16/56; Gold: 74.4K; Turrets: 10; Drakes: 4 Elder Dragons: 0 Barons: 1 Rift Heralds: 1 Voidgrubs: 3	Game 5; 34:14; BLG wins series 3–2			K/D/A: 16/25/30; Gold: 58.9K; Turrets: 0 Drakes: 1 Elder Dragons: 0 Barons: 0 Rift Heralds: 0 Voidgrubs: 0	

Opening Match	16 March	G2 Esports	3	–	0	Secret Whales	São Paulo, Brazil
	15:00 (UTC−3)						Riot Games Arena
		K/D/A: 22/10/52; Gold: 66.5K; Turrets: 10; Drakes: 3 Elder Dragons: 0 Barons: 2 Rift Heralds: 0 Voidgrubs: 1	Game 1; 29:22; G2 leads series 1–0			K/D/A: 10/22/24; Gold: 50.9K; Turrets: 1 Drakes: 1 Elder Dragons: 0 Barons: 0 Rift Heralds: 1 Voidgrubs: 2	
		K/D/A: 21/19/51; Gold: 66.4K; Turrets: 7 Drakes: 3 Elder Dragons: 0 Barons: 1 Rift Heralds: 1 Voidgrubs: 0	Game 2; 33:24; G2 leads series 2–0			K/D/A: 19/22/44; Gold: 62.9K; Turrets: 3 Drakes: 2 Elder Dragons: 0 Barons: 0 Rift Heralds: 0 Voidgrubs: 3	
		K/D/A: 20/12/39; Gold: 60.8K; Turrets: 11; Drakes: 2 Elder Dragons: 0 Barons: 1 Rift Heralds: 0 Voidgrubs: 3	Game 3; 27:46; G2 wins series 3–0			K/D/A: 12/20/12; Gold: 50.9K; Turrets: 2 Drakes: 2 Elder Dragons: 0 Barons: 0 Rift Heralds: 1 Voidgrubs: 0	

Winners Match	18 March	Bilibili Gaming	3	–	0	G2 Esports	São Paulo, Brazil
	10:00 (UTC−3)						Riot Games Arena
		K/D/A: 16/8/37; Gold: 68.1K; Turrets: 10; Drakes: 4 Elder Dragons: 0 Barons: 1 Rift Heralds: 1 Voidgrubs: 0	Game 1; 32:53; BLG leads series 1–0			K/D/A: 8/16/16; Gold: 57.0K; Turrets: 1 Drakes: 1 Elder Dragons: 0 Barons: 0 Rift Heralds: 0 Voidgrubs: 3	
		K/D/A: 18/7/41; Gold: 60.9K; Turrets: 8 Drakes: 2 Elder Dragons: 0 Barons: 1 Rift Heralds: 1 Voidgrubs: 3	Game 2; 29:54; BLG leads series 2–0			K/D/A: 7/18/11; Gold: 49.8K; Turrets: 0 Drakes: 3 Elder Dragons: 0 Barons: 0 Rift Heralds: 0 Voidgrubs: 0	
		K/D/A: 27/12/41; Gold: 66.9K; Turrets: 9 Drakes: 4 Elder Dragons: 0 Barons: 1 Rift Heralds: 1 Voidgrubs: 2	Game 3; 30:04; BLG wins series 3–0			K/D/A: 12/27/35; Gold: 54.5K; Turrets: 1 Drakes: 1 Elder Dragons: 0 Barons: 0 Rift Heralds: 0 Voidgrubs: 1	

Knockout Match	18 March	BNK FearX	3	–	0	Secret Whales	São Paulo, Brazil
	15:00 (UTC−3)						Riot Games Arena
		K/D/A: 23/16/54; Gold: 60.6K; Turrets: 10; Drakes: 4 Elder Dragons: 0 Barons: 1 Rift Heralds: 1 Voidgrubs: 1	Game 1; 27:26; BFX leads series 1–0			K/D/A: 16/23/37; Gold: 53.5K; Turrets: 3 Drakes: 0 Elder Dragons: 0 Barons: 0 Rift Heralds: 0 Voidgrubs: 1	
		K/D/A: 22/13/51; Gold: 59.1K; Turrets: 9 Drakes: 3 Elder Dragons: 0 Barons: 1 Rift Heralds: 0 Voidgrubs: 3	Game 2; 27:01; BFX leads series 2–0			K/D/A: 12/22/25; Gold: 45.6K; Turrets: 0 Drakes: 0 Elder Dragons: 0 Barons: 0 Rift Heralds: 1 Voidgrubs: 0	
		K/D/A: 15/13/32; Gold: 56.9K; Turrets: 7 Drakes: 1 Elder Dragons: 0 Barons: 0 Rift Heralds: 1 Voidgrubs: 3	Game 3; 28:48; BFX wins series 3–0			K/D/A: 13/15/24; Gold: 49.5K; Turrets: 1 Drakes: 3 Elder Dragons: 0 Barons: 0 Rift Heralds: 0 Voidgrubs: 0	

Decider Match	20 March	G2 Esports	3	–	0	BNK FearX	São Paulo, Brazil
	10:00 (UTC−3)						Riot Games Arena
		K/D/A: 22/6/45; Gold: 69.0K; Turrets: 11; Drakes: 4 Elder Dragons: 1 Barons: 2 Rift Heralds: 0 Voidgrubs: 3	Game 1; 31:48; G2 leads series 1–0			K/D/A: 6/22/15; Gold: 56.0K; Turrets: 4 Drakes: 0 Elder Dragons: 0 Barons: 0 Rift Heralds: 1 Voidgrubs: 0	
		K/D/A: 28/24/71; Gold: 74.5K; Turrets: 7 Drakes: 2 Elder Dragons: 0 Barons: 1 Rift Heralds: 0 Voidgrubs: 0	Game 2; 36:27; G2 leads series 2–0			K/D/A: 23/28/52; Gold: 67.6K; Turrets: 5 Drakes: 3 Elder Dragons: 0 Barons: 1 Rift Heralds: 1 Voidgrubs: 3	
		K/D/A: 24/7/48; Gold: 64.5K; Turrets: 9 Drakes: 3 Elder Dragons: 0 Barons: 1 Rift Heralds: 1 Voidgrubs: 0	Game 3; 30:30; G2 wins series 3–0			K/D/A: 7/24/9; Gold: 52.7K; Turrets: 3 Drakes: 1 Elder Dragons: 0 Barons: 0 Rift Heralds: 0 Voidgrubs: 3	

=== Group B ===
Opening Matches
March 17, 10:00 BRT
Gen.G	3
JD Gaming	0
March 17, 15:00 BRT
LYON	3
LOUD	2
Knockout Match
March 19, 15:00 BRT
JD Gaming	3
LOUD	0

Winners Match
March 19, 10:00 BRT
Gen.G	3
LYON	0
Decider Match
March 20, 15:00 BRT
LYON	1
JD Gaming	3

Playoffs Qualified
Gen.G
JD Gaming

Source: LoL Esports

Opening Match	17 March	Gen.G	3	–	0	JD Gaming	São Paulo, Brazil
	10:00 (UTC−3)						Riot Games Arena
		K/D/A: 15/4/47; Gold: 53.6K; Turrets: 8 Drakes: 3 Elder Dragons: 0 Barons: 1 Rift Heralds: 1 Voidgrubs: 0	Game 1; 23:09; GEN leads series 1–0			K/D/A: 4/15/6; Gold: 36.8K; Turrets: 0 Drakes: 0 Elder Dragons: 0 Barons: 0 Rift Heralds: 0 Voidgrubs: 3	
		K/D/A: 16/7/39; Gold: 56.1K; Turrets: 8 Drakes: 3 Elder Dragons: 0 Barons: 1 Rift Heralds: 1 Voidgrubs: 2	Game 2; 24:26; GEN leads series 2–0			K/D/A: 7/16/15; Gold: 42.1K; Turrets: 1 Drakes: 1 Elder Dragons: 0 Barons: 0 Rift Heralds: 0 Voidgrubs: 1	
		K/D/A: 15/9/26; Gold: 61.1K; Turrets: 8 Drakes: 3 Elder Dragons: 0 Barons: 1 Rift Heralds: 0 Voidgrubs: 3	Game 3; 29:49; GEN wins series 3–0			K/D/A: 9/15/18; Gold: 51.7K; Turrets: 2 Drakes: 2 Elder Dragons: 0 Barons: 0 Rift Heralds: 1 Voidgrubs: 0	

Opening Match	17 March	LYON	3	–	2	LOUD	São Paulo, Brazil
	15:00 (UTC−3)						Riot Games Arena
		K/D/A: 19/4/28; Gold: 59.8K; Turrets: 9 Drakes: 4 Elder Dragons: 0 Barons: 1 Rift Heralds: 1 Voidgrubs: 3	Game 1; 27:14; LYON leads series 1–0			K/D/A: 4/19/6; Gold: 42.7K; Turrets: 0 Drakes: 0 Elder Dragons: 0 Barons: 0 Rift Heralds: 0 Voidgrubs: 0	
		K/D/A: 11/20/17; Gold: 65.5K; Turrets: 3 Drakes: 1 Elder Dragons: 0 Barons: 1 Rift Heralds: 1 Voidgrubs: 2	Game 2; 36:17; Series tied 1–1			K/D/A: 20/11/38; Gold: 73.1K; Turrets: 8 Drakes: 4 Elder Dragons: 0 Barons: 1 Rift Heralds: 0 Voidgrubs: 1	
		K/D/A: 12/4/25; Gold: 61.5K; Turrets: 7 Drakes: 4 Elder Dragons: 0 Barons: 1 Rift Heralds: 1 Voidgrubs: 1	Game 3; 30:34; LYON leads series 2–1			K/D/A: 4/12/2; Gold: 52.5K; Turrets: 2 Drakes: 0 Elder Dragons: 0 Barons: 0 Rift Heralds: 0 Voidgrubs: 2	
		K/D/A: 9/16/23; Gold: 53.5K; Turrets: 1 Drakes: 1 Elder Dragons: 0 Barons: 0 Rift Heralds: 1 Voidgrubs: 3	Game 4; 31:16; Series tied 2–2			K/D/A: 16/9/39; Gold: 63.8K; Turrets: 10; Drakes: 3 Elder Dragons: 0 Barons: 1 Rift Heralds: 0 Voidgrubs: 0	
		K/D/A: 15/5/31; Gold: 71.5K; Turrets: 11; Drakes: 4 Elder Dragons: 0 Barons: 2 Rift Heralds: 1 Voidgrubs: 3	Game 5; 31:16; LYON wins series 3–2			K/D/A: 5/15/11; Gold: 59.3K; Turrets: 3 Drakes: 1 Elder Dragons: 0 Barons: 0 Rift Heralds: 0 Voidgrubs: 0	

Winners Match	19 March	Gen.G	3	–	0	LYON	São Paulo, Brazil
	10:00 (UTC−3)						Riot Games Arena
		K/D/A: 17/3/44; Gold: 53.7K; Turrets: 7 Drakes: 4 Elder Dragons: 0 Barons: 0 Rift Heralds: 1 Voidgrubs: 3	Game 1; 25:27; GEN leads series 1–0			K/D/A: 3/17/8; Gold: 40.7K; Turrets: 0 Drakes: 0 Elder Dragons: 0 Barons: 0 Rift Heralds: 0 Voidgrubs: 0	
		K/D/A: 18/9/38; Gold: 56.3K; Turrets: 8 Drakes: 3 Elder Dragons: 0 Barons: 1 Rift Heralds: 1 Voidgrubs: 3	Game 2; 25:53; GEN leads series 2–0			K/D/A: 9/18/11; Gold: 47.6K; Turrets: 2 Drakes: 1 Elder Dragons: 0 Barons: 0 Rift Heralds: 0 Voidgrubs: 0	
		K/D/A: 30/10/48; Gold: 58.8K; Turrets: 10; Drakes: 3 Elder Dragons: 0 Barons: 1 Rift Heralds: 1 Voidgrubs: 3	Game 3; 25:06; GEN wins series 3–0			K/D/A: 8/30/13; Gold: 43.2K; Turrets: 0 Drakes: 0 Elder Dragons: 0 Barons: 0 Rift Heralds: 0 Voidgrubs: 0	

Knockout Match	19 March	JD Gaming	3	–	0	LOUD	São Paulo, Brazil
	15:00 (UTC−3)						Riot Games Arena
		K/D/A: 10/6/20; Gold: 62.0K; Turrets: 9 Drakes: 4 Elder Dragons: 0 Barons: 1 Rift Heralds: 1 Voidgrubs: 3	Game 1; 29:16; JDG leads series 1–0			K/D/A: 6/11/6; Gold: 48.9K; Turrets: 1 Drakes: 0 Elder Dragons: 0 Barons: 0 Rift Heralds: 0 Voidgrubs: 0	
		K/D/A: 14/3/24; Gold: 56.3K; Turrets: 10; Drakes: 4 Elder Dragons: 0 Barons: 0 Rift Heralds: 1 Voidgrubs: 3	Game 2; 25:37; JDG leads series 2–0			K/D/A: 3/14/6; Gold: 41.7K; Turrets: 0 Drakes: 0 Elder Dragons: 0 Barons: 0 Rift Heralds: 0 Voidgrubs: 0	
		K/D/A: 19/7/34; Gold: 46.1K; Turrets: 9 Drakes: 3 Elder Dragons: 0 Barons: 0 Rift Heralds: 1 Voidgrubs: 3	Game 3; 20:58; JDG wins series 3–0			K/D/A: 7/19/14; Gold: 35.6K; Turrets: 0 Drakes: 0 Elder Dragons: 0 Barons: 0 Rift Heralds: 0 Voidgrubs: 0	

Decider Match	20 March	LYON	1	–	3	JD Gaming	São Paulo, Brazil
	15:00 (UTC−3)						Riot Games Arena
		K/D/A: 8/6/11; Gold: 55.4K; Turrets: 6 Drakes: 3 Elder Dragons: 0 Barons: 0 Rift Heralds: 0 Voidgrubs: 0	Game 1; 30:00; JDG leads series 1–0			K/D/A: 6/8/15; Gold: 57.5K; Turrets: 7 Drakes: 1 Elder Dragons: 0 Barons: 1 Rift Heralds: 1 Voidgrubs: 3	
		K/D/A: 13/18/34; Gold: 78.0K; Turrets: 8 Drakes: 3 Elder Dragons: 0 Barons: 0 Rift Heralds: 0 Voidgrubs: 0	Game 2; 41:02; Series tied 1–1			K/D/A: 18/13/49; Gold: 78.3K; Turrets: 6 Drakes: 3 Elder Dragons: 0 Barons: 2 Rift Heralds: 1 Voidgrubs: 3	
		K/D/A: 6/17/13; Gold: 51.2K; Turrets: 2 Drakes: 1 Elder Dragons: 0 Barons: 0 Rift Heralds: 1 Voidgrubs: 3	Game 3; 29:45; JDG leads series 2–1			K/D/A: 17/6/44; Gold: 63.0K; Turrets: 8 Drakes: 2 Elder Dragons: 0 Barons: 1 Rift Heralds: 0 Voidgrubs: 0	
		K/D/A: 10/20/22; Gold: 73.0K; Turrets: 3 Drakes: 2 Elder Dragons: 0 Barons: 1 Rift Heralds: 0 Voidgrubs: 0	Game 4; 41:16; JDG wins series 3–1			K/D/A: 20/10/62; Gold: 81.1K; Turrets: 10; Drakes: 4 Elder Dragons: 1 Barons: 1 Rift Heralds: 1 Voidgrubs: 3	

== Knockout Stage ==
- Date and time: March 21–22, start time at 10:00 BRT (UTC−3)
- All matches were best-of-five.
- The winning region received two automatic byes to the 2026 Mid-Season Invitational Bracket Stage

Semifinals
21 March, 10:00 BRT
B1	Gen.G	0
A2	G2 Esports	3
21 March, 18:00 BRT
A1	Bilibili Gaming	3
B2	JD Gaming	0

Final
22 March, TBD BRT
G2 Esports	1
Bilibili Gaming	3

=== Semifinals ===
Semifinals	21 March	Gen.G	0	–	3	G2 Esports	São Paulo, Brazil
	10:00 (UTC−3)						Riot Games Arena
		K/D/A: 4/16/10; Gold: 56.2K; Turrets: 2 Drakes: 1 Elder Dragons: 0 Barons: 0 Rift Heralds: 0 Voidgrubs: 1	Game 1; 32:15; G2 leads series 1–0			K/D/A: 16/4/34; Gold: 68.6K; Turrets: 11; Drakes: 4 Elder Dragons: 0 Barons: 1 Rift Heralds: 1 Voidgrubs: 2	
		K/D/A: 6/15/19; Gold: 58.9K; Turrets: 2 Drakes: 3 Elder Dragons: 0 Barons: 0 Rift Heralds: 0 Voidgrubs: 3	Game 2; 32:15; G2 leads series 2–0			K/D/A: 15/6/41; Gold: 65.2K; Turrets: 11; Drakes: 2 Elder Dragons: 0 Barons: 2 Rift Heralds: 1 Voidgrubs: 0	
		K/D/A: 3/16/9; Gold: 52.1K; Turrets: 1 Drakes: 0 Elder Dragons: 0 Barons: 0 Rift Heralds: 0 Voidgrubs: 0	Game 3; 30:14; G2 wins series 3–0			K/D/A: 16/3/34; Gold: 63.3K; Turrets: 10; Drakes: 4 Elder Dragons: 0 Barons: 1 Rift Heralds: 1 Voidgrubs: 1	

Semifinals	21 March	Bilibili Gaming	3	–	0	JD Gaming	São Paulo, Brazil
	15:00 (UTC−3)						Riot Games Arena
		K/D/A: 22/11/55; Gold: 71.3K; Turrets: 10; Drakes: 2 Elder Dragons: 0 Barons: 2 Rift Heralds: 1 Voidgrubs: 2	Game 1; 32:16; BLG leads series 1–0			K/D/A: 11/22/26; Gold: 55.5K; Turrets: 1 Drakes: 3 Elder Dragons: 0 Barons: 0 Rift Heralds: 0 Voidgrubs: 1	
		K/D/A: 15/7/36; Gold: 61.1K; Turrets: 9 Drakes: 2 Elder Dragons: 0 Barons: 1 Rift Heralds: 1 Voidgrubs: 0	Game 2; 29:47; BLG leads series 2–0			K/D/A: 7/15/11; Gold: 51.5K; Turrets: 3 Drakes: 2 Elder Dragons: 0 Barons: 0 Rift Heralds: 0 Voidgrubs: 3	
		K/D/A: 22/9/43; Gold: 76.9K; Turrets: 9 Drakes: 4 Elder Dragons: 0 Barons: 2 Rift Heralds: 1 Voidgrubs: 3	Game 3; 36:57; BLG wins series 3–0			K/D/A: 9/22/22; Gold: 67.7K; Turrets: 1 Drakes: 2 Elder Dragons: 0 Barons: 0 Rift Heralds: 0 Voidgrubs: 0	

=== Final ===
Finals	22 March	G2 Esports	1	–	3	Bilibili Gaming	São Paulo, Brazil
	10:00 (UTC−3)						Riot Games Arena
		K/D/A: 23/13/48; Gold: 74.3K; Turrets: 7 Drakes: 2 Elder Dragons: 0 Barons: 0 Rift Heralds: 1 Voidgrubs: 3	Game 1; 38:11; G2 leads series 1–0			K/D/A: 13/23/28; Gold: 71.8K; Turrets: 5 Drakes: 3 Elder Dragons: 0 Barons: 2 Rift Heralds: 0 Voidgrubs: 0	
		K/D/A: 12/28/22; Gold: 73.9K; Turrets: 3 Drakes: 1 Elder Dragons: 0 Barons: 0 Rift Heralds: 0 Voidgrubs: 0	Game 2; 39:33; Series tied 1–1			K/D/A: 28/12/57; Gold: 79.9K; Turrets: 9 Drakes: 4 Elder Dragons: 0 Barons: 1 Rift Heralds: 0 Voidgrubs: 3	
		K/D/A: 5/17/14; Gold: 46.6K; Turrets: 1 Drakes: 1 Elder Dragons: 0 Barons: 0 Rift Heralds: 0 Voidgrubs: 0	Game 3; 28:15; BLG leads series 2–1			K/D/A: 17/5/44; Gold: 59.9K; Turrets: 9 Drakes: 3 Elder Dragons: 0 Barons: 1 Rift Heralds: 1 Voidgrubs: 3	
		K/D/A: 12/8/26; Gold: 48.4K; Turrets: 1 Drakes: 3 Elder Dragons: 0 Barons: 0 Rift Heralds: 1 Voidgrubs: 0	Game 4; 26:35; BLG wins series 3–1			K/D/A: 8/12/19; Gold: 51.7K; Turrets: 7 Drakes: 1 Elder Dragons: 0 Barons: 1 Rift Heralds: 0 Voidgrubs: 3	

== Final standings ==
A base prize pool of US$1,000,000 is offered for the tournament.

Place	Team	GS	SF	Finals	Prize (%)	Prize (USD)
1st	Bilibili Gaming	2–0	3–0	3–1	25%	$250,000
2nd	G2 Esports	2–1	3–0	1–3	15%	$150,000
3rd–4th	Gen.G	2–0	0–3	–	12.5%	$125,500
3rd–4th	JD Gaming	2–1	0–3	–	12.5%	$125,500
5th–6th	LYON	1–2	–	–	10%	$100,000
5th–6th	BNK FearX	1–2	–	–	10%	$100,000
7th–8th	LOUD	0–2	–	–	7.5%	$75,000
7th–8th	Secret Whales	0–2	–	–	7.5%	$75,000
Place	Team	GS	SF	Finals	Prize (%)	Prize (USD)

== Marketing ==
The tournament's official slogan, Lead The Charge, was unveiled on 2 March 2026 alongside a release of the tournament primer.
