= 2026 CBLOL season =

- League: CBLOL
- Sport: League of Legends
- Duration: 17 January – 1 March (CBLOL Cup); 28 March – 6 June (Split 1); 25 July – 10 October (Split 2)
- Teams: 8

CBLOL Cup
- Champions: LOUD
- Runners-up: RED Canids Kalunga
- Season MVP: Song "Bull" Seon-gyu (LOUD)

Split 1
- Champions: FURIA
- Runners-up: RED Canids Kalunga
- Season MVP: Pedro "Tatu" Seixas (FURIA)

Split 2
- Champions: Los Grandes
- Runners-up: FURIA

CBLOL seasons
- ← 2025 (LTA South) 2027 →

The 2026 CBLOL season was the 14th season of the Campeonato Brasileiro de League of Legends (CBLOL), a Brazilian professional esports league for the video game League of Legends. It was the first season after the league's reinstatement following the discontinuation of the League of Legends Championship of The Americas (LTA), which merged the CBLOL with the League Championship Series (LCS), which was also reinstated, and the Liga Latinoamérica (LLA) in 2025.

It was the first CBLOL season under the new three-split structure and competitive calendar introduced by the game's developer Riot Games during the 2025 competitive season. The season began on 17 January and ended 10 October.

LOUD won the CBLOL Cup after defeating Red Canids Kalunga in a 3–0 sweep, qualifying for the First Stand Tournament. The following split, FURIA also defeated Red Canids Kalunga with a score of 3–1, with both teams representing the region at the Mid-Season Invitational. Guest team Los Grandes won the final split, defeating FURIA to win its maiden CBLOL title. Both teams qualified for the 2026 World Championship as the top two seeds.

== Background ==
The CBLOL initially ceased following Riot Games' announcement on 11 June 2024 in a blog post titled "LoL Esports: Building Towards A Brighter Future" that the CBLOL, LCS and LLA would plan to merge into a Pan-American league that would begin play in 2025, which would eventually be known as the League of Legends Championship of The Americas or LTA. The new merged league, which consisted of two conferences (North and South), had its first season in 2025, but was met with criticism on branding, competitive gaps between the Northern and Southern teams, and split formats. As a result, the new league struggled in viewership numbers. According to Esports Charts, all three splits of LTA South garnered an average of 244,200 peak viewers - significantly lower than the two splits of the 2024 CBLOL season, which garnered a peak viewership average of 395,700. Furthermore, Splits 1 & 2 of the latter season had 459,846 and 331,713 peak viewers respectively - with each LTA South split unable to reach 300,000 at minimum.

Aside from viewership declines, cross-conference quarterfinals matchups from the LTA's first split saw all North Conference teams won their best-of-three series against the South Conference in an 8-1 game record, with Isurus (then known as Isurus Estral) being the only Southern team to take a game in their series against Team Liquid. Due to this, several fans have criticized the competitive gap between teams from the North and the South. However, this would be improved upon in the final split, with RED Canids beating Shopify Rebellion in Round 1 of the LTA Playoffs, and Vivo Keyd Stars beating 100 Thieves in the Lower Bracket Final of the said phase - all in best-of-five series.

During the maiden LTA Championship Finals between FlyQuest of the North Conference (now LCS) and Vivo Keyd Stars of the South Conference (now CBLOL), Riot Games announced that the LCS and CBLOL would return as independent leagues beginning with the 2026 competitive season.

== League changes ==
=== Splits ===
On 5 November 2025, the CBLOL announced that the first split would be known as the CBLOL Cup, similar to the LCK Cup of the League of Legends Champions Korea. The next two splits will be respectively known as Splits 1 and 2.

=== Teams ===
Starting in 2026, the CBLOL will have one guest team similar to the lone LTA season, where the guest team will be subject to promotion and relegation against teams from Tier 2 leagues (Circuito Desafiante and Liga Regional Sur). Before the lone LTA season in 2025, it was announced that INTZ, KaBuM! Esports, Liberty, and Los Grandes, four teams from the most recent CBLOL season, would leave the league following the 2024 season. KabuM! Esports and Los Grandes would be invited to compete in the second-tier Circuito Desafiante beginning in 2025.

Two team changes occurred heading into the 2026 season. Leviatán, who was selected as a partner team in the former LTA South from the former LLA, was confirmed to remain as a partner team for the 2026 CBLOL season, marking their first appearance in the league. Furthermore, Isurus would win the LTA South promotion and relegation tournament to advance to its first CBLOL season in 2026. However, Isurus would withdraw on 4 December, citing challenges relating from the transition from LTA to CBLOL and the lack of a chance for the team to compete in global events. On 16 December, Riot Games announced that Los Grandes would take the guest spot previously held by Isurus, effectively being promoted from the Circuito Desafiante; KaBuM! IDL (a partnership between KaBuM! and Ilha das Lendas) were initially selected to take over the guest spot, but the organization declined the offer, instead focusing on the tier 2 scene.

=== Formats ===
Both Splits 2 and 3 (named Splits 1 and 2) will follow the same format, similar to the League of Legends EMEA Championship (LEC) and the League Championship Series (LCS). All three splits will also have a similar playoff format, mirroring that of the 2024 LCS Summer Split playoffs.

=== International tournament slots ===
The CBLOL will be allocated one team for both the First Stand Tournament and Mid-Season Invitational and was initially also allocated one team for the League of Legends World Championship. This was met by criticisms from fans, citing a low number of spots for the region given the CBLOL teams' performance in the LTA Playoffs against LCS teams, and played a role in Isurus withdrawing prior to the start of the 2026 season.

On 22 March 2026, prior to the final of the First Stand Tournament, Riot Games announced that the CBLOL would be allocated two teams for the World Championship instead of the planned single team. During a press conference, Riot's Global Head of LoL Esports Chris Geeley noted that criticisms or competitive results to the decision were not considered, instead it was a lack of time considering the impact of slot allocations.

== CBLOL Cup ==
=== Format ===
The CBLOL Cup featured eight (8) teams competing in a single-round robin tournament where all matches were played in best-of-ones. The top four (4) teams directly qualified for the playoffs, while the bottom four (4) teams competed in the play-in tournament. In the play-in phase, the format mirrored that of the NBA play-in tournament. The fifth and sixth ranked teams competed for the fifth playoff seed, while the seventh and eighth ranked teams faced off against one another with the loser being eliminated - all of which were best-of-threes. The winner of the 7/8 match and the loser of the 5/6 match vied for the sixth and final playoff seed in a best-of-five series.

In the playoffs, the top two (2) ranked teams began the second round, with the top-ranked team being able to choose their opponents. All remaining teams started in the first round. The playoffs had a Double-elimination tournament bracket with an extended lower bracket and a mix of best-of-three and best-of-five matches, with the winner of the CBLOL Cup qualifying to represent the league as its lone representative at the 2026 First Stand Tournament, which was held in Brazil. The runner-up and third place teams qualified for the Americas Cup, a cross-regional competition alongside teams from the LCS.

=== Regular season ===
Venue: Riot Games Arena, São Paulo, Brazil

Pos	Team	Pld	W	L	PCT	Qualification
1	Los Grandes	7	6	1	.857	Playoffs
2	RED Canids Kalunga	7	5	2	.714	Playoffs
3	FURIA	7	5	2	.714	Playoffs
4	LOUD	7	3	4	.429	Playoffs
5	Vivo Keyd Stars	7	3	4	.429	Play-In; 5th Seed Playoff
6	paiN Gaming	7	2	5	.286	Play-In; 5th Seed Playoff
7	Fluxo w7m	7	2	5	.286	Play-In; 6th Seed Playoff
8	Leviatán	7	2	5	.286	Play-In; 6th Seed Playoff

Updated to match(es) played on 1 February 2026. Source: LoL Esports

=== Play-ins ===
Round 1
2 February
6	paIN Gaming	1
5	Vivo Keyd Stars	2
2 February
8	Leviatán	2
7	Fluxo w7m	0

6th Seed Playoff
3 February
6	paIN Gaming	1
8	Leviatán	3

Final seeds
Vivo Keyd Stars	No. 5
Leviatán	No. 6

Source: LoL Esports

=== Playoffs ===
Venue: Riot Games Arena, São Paulo, Brazil

Round 1	Round 2	Round 3	Final
8 February
7 February	1	Los Grandes	1
4	LOUD	2	4	LOUD	2	21 February
5	Vivo Keyd Stars	0	4	LOUD	3
8 February	2	RED Canids Kalunga	1
7 February	2	RED Canids Kalunga	2
3	FURIA	2	3	FURIA	0
1 March
8	Leviatán	0
4	LOUD	3
2	RED Canids Kalunga	0
Lower round 1	Lower round 2	Lower round 3	Lower final
28 February
22 February	2	RED Canids Kalunga	3
15 February	1	Los Grandes	1	3	FURIA	1
14 February	3	FURIA	3	3	FURIA	3
5	Vivo Keyd Stars	1	8	Leviatán	0
8	Leviatán	3

Source: LoL Esports

== Split 1 ==
=== Format ===
Split 1 featured eight (8) teams competing in a single-round robin tournament where all matches were played in best-of-threes. The top six (6) teams advanced to the playoffs. The playoffs mirrored the CBLOL Cup playoff format, and similarly, the top two (2) ranked teams received a bye to the second round, with the top-ranked team choosing their opponents. The winner of Split 1 qualified for the 2026 Mid-Season Invitational and was placed in the bracket stage.

=== Regular season ===
Venue: Riot Games Arena, São Paulo, Brazil

Pos	Team	Pld	W	L	PCT	Qualification
1	RED Canids Kalunga	7	6	1	.857	Playoffs
2	FURIA	7	5	2	.714	Playoffs
3	Vivo Keyd Stars	7	4	3	.571	Playoffs
4	Los Grandes	7	4	3	.571	Playoffs
5	Fluxo w7m	7	4	3	.571	Playoffs
6	LOUD	7	3	4	.429	Playoffs
7	paiN Gaming	7	1	6	.143	Eliminated
8	Leviatán	7	1	6	.143	Eliminated

Updated to match(es) played on 3 May 2026. Source: LoL Esports

=== Playoffs ===
Venue: Riot Games Arena, São Paulo, Brazil

Round 1	Round 2	Round 3	Final
16 May
5 May	1	RED Canids Kalunga	3
4	Los Grandes	2	5	Fluxo w7m	1	24 May
5	Fluxo w7m	3	1	RED Canids Kalunga	0
17 May	2	FURIA	3
9 May	2	FURIA	3
3	Vivo Keyd Stars	1	6	LOUD	0
6 June
6	LOUD	3
2	FURIA	3
4	Los Grandes	1
Lower round 1	Lower round 2	Lower round 3	Lower final
31 May
30 May	1	RED Canids Kalunga	0
25 May	5	Fluxo w7m	2	4	Los Grandes	3
23 May	6	LOUD	2	4	Los Grandes	3
4	Los Grandes	3	4	Los Grandes	3
3	Vivo Keyd Stars	0

Source: LoL Esports

=== Awards ===
Award	Player	Team
Finals MVP	Tatu	FURIA
Most Fearless Player	Zest	Los Grandes
All-Pro Team
All-Pro Team	Zest	Los Grandes
All-Pro Team	Tatu	FURIA
All-Pro Team	Kaze	Red Canids Kalunga
All-Pro Team	Ayu	FURIA
All-Pro Team	JoJo	FURIA

== Split 2 ==
=== Format ===
The same eight (8) teams competed in Split 2 in a single-round robin tournament where all matches were played in best-of-threes. The top six (6) teams advanced to the playoffs, applying the same format and team seeding principles as Split 1. All matches were played in best-of-fives, with the finalists of Split 2 securing qualification for the 2026 League of Legends World Championship.

On 9 July 2026, Riot Games announced the final of Split 2 on October 10 would be held in a road show, with the location revealed to be the Carioca Arena 1 in Rio de Janeiro.

=== Regular season ===
Pos	Team	Pld	W	L	PCT	Qualification
1	LOUD	7	6	1	.857	Playoffs
2	Los Grandes	7	6	1	.857	Playoffs
3	FURIA	7	5	2	.714	Playoffs
4	Vivo Keyd Stars	7	5	2	.714	Playoffs
5	paiN Gaming	7	2	5	.286	Playoffs
6	RED Canids Kalunga	7	2	5	.286	Playoffs
7	Leviatán	7	1	6	.143	Eliminated
8	Fluxo w7m	7	1	6	.143	Eliminated

Updated to match(es) played on 30 August 2026. Source: LoL Esports

=== Playoffs ===
Venues:

- Riot Games Arena, São Paulo
- Carioca Arena 1, Rio de Janeiro (Final)

Round 1	Round 2	Round 3	Final
12 September – São Paulo
6 September – São Paulo	2	Los Grandes	3
3	FURIA	3	3	FURIA	1	27 September – São Paulo
6	RED Canids Kalunga	0	2	Los Grandes	3
13 September – São Paulo	1	LOUD	2
5 September – São Paulo	1	LOUD	3
4	Vivo Keyd Stars	1	5	paiN Gaming	1
10 October – Rio de Janeiro
5	paiN Gaming	3
2	Los Grandes	3
3	FURIA	2
Lower round 1	Lower round 2	Lower round 3	Lower final
3 October – São Paulo
26 September – São Paulo	1	LOUD	0
20 September – São Paulo	3	FURIA	3	3	FURIA	3
19 September – São Paulo	5	paiN Gaming	1	6	RED Canids Kalunga	2
6	RED Canids Kalunga	3	6	RED Canids Kalunga	3
4	Vivo Keyd Stars	0

Source: LoL Esports
