= LTAS =

LTAS may refer to:

- Zonguldak Airport (ICAO:LTAS)
- LTA South, a conference of the League of Legends Championship of The Americas, now known as Campeonato Brasileiro de League of Legends
