= Loud (esports) =

Brazilian esports organisation

LOUD
- Short name: LLL
- Games: Free Fire; League of Legends; Valorant; Brawl Stars
- Founded: 28 February 2019; 7 years ago
- Based in: Headquarters: São Paulo; Teams: Los Angeles (Valorant)
- Owners: Bruno Oliveira; Jean Ortega; Mathew Ho; Vinícius Júnior
- Partners: Itaú; Mentos; Samsung; TIM Brasil oBoticário
- Website: loud.gg

Loud (stylized in all caps) is a Brazilian esports organization with teams competing in Free Fire, League of Legends, Valorant and Brawl Stars. Founded in 2019, LOUD is the esports organization with the largest number of followers on social media in Brazil and the second largest in the world. LOUD's Valorant team won 2022 Valorant Champions and Best Esports Team at Esports Awards and The Game Awards.

== History ==
LOUD was created on February 28, 2019 by YouTuber Bruno "PlayHard" Oliveira along with entrepreneurs Jean Ortega and Mathew Ho. Since the beginning, LOUD has focused on creating videos on YouTube and popularizing its players and influencers. Being one of the pioneers of this model in Brazil, LOUD became the first Brazilian esports organization to reach 1 billion views.

In December 2023, professional footballer Vinícius Júnior acquired a stake in the organization, becoming a partner.

== Partnerships and collaborations ==
In August 2021, LOUD stamped the new packaging of Fusion Energy Drink, an Ambev brand of energy drinks. In January 2023, Burger King launched a LOUD-themed restaurant in São Paulo for 1 month.

In May 2024, LOUD was announced as a member of the Esports World Cup Foundation Club Support Program, run by the Esports World Cup Foundation, which is funded by the Saudi Arabia Public Investment Fund. This partnership program gives teams a one-time six-figure stipend if an organization is willing to enter new esports as well as additional funding each year if they drive viewership and fan engagement to the Esports World Cup tournament series.

== Current divisions ==
=== Free Fire ===
LOUD started as a Free Fire team, due to the popularization of the game in Brazil in 2019. LOUD's Free Fire team won the 2020 Copa America and the 2022 Liga Brasileira de Free Fire Stage 1.

LOUD Free Fire roster
Players
Coaches

Handle	Name	Nationality
Cauan7	Santos, Cauan	Brazil
Lost21	Souza, Luan	Brazil
Draxx	Borges, Victor	Brazil
Yago	Vinicius, Yago	Brazil

Head coach

Marcos "Frois" Frois

Assistant coach(es)

Frank "Frank7" Willian

Legend:
- (I) Inactive
- (S) Suspended
- Substitute
- (injured) Injury / Illness

Latest roster transaction: 20 April 2024.

=== League of Legends ===
LOUD's League of Legends team competes in the League of Legends Championship of The Americas (LTA), the top professional league of the game in the Americas, as a partnered team in the South Conference. They were previously members of the Campeonato Brasileiro de League of Legends (CBLOL), Brazil's top professional league

On 3 September 2022, LOUD swept paiN Gaming to win its first CBLOL title, qualifying the team for the 2022 World Championship. LOUD would win three additional CBLOL splits back-to-back, winning four consecutive titles overall, before falling to RED Canids in the final CBLOL split in 2024.

=== Achievements ===
Domestic

- CBLOL/ LTA South
  - Winners (4): 2022-2, 2023-1, 2023-2, 2024-1
- CBLOL Cup
  - Winners (1): 2026

=== Roster ===
LOUD League of Legends roster
Players
Coaches

Handle	Name	Nationality
Xyno	Ferreira, Carlos	Brazil
YoungJae	Yeong-jae, Ko	South Korea
MAGO	Dias, Jean	Brazil
Bull	Seon-gyu, Song	South Korea
Redbert	Flores, Ygor	Brazil

Head coach

Oh "Raise" Ji-hwan

Assistant coach(es)

Diego Alejandro de Alencar Jara "Sephis"

Legend:
- (I) Inactive
- (S) Suspended
- Substitute
- (injured) Injury / Illness

Latest roster transaction: 21 December 2025.

=== Valorant ===
LOUD arrived on the Valorant scene in early 2022 by signing a free agent team named "paNcada e amigos" (lit. 'paNcada and friends'). LOUD's Valorant team won the 2022 Valorant Champions, the culmination of that year's Valorant Champions Tour, the game's most prestigious international tournament. In 2023, LOUD placed second at LOCK//IN São Paulo after a narrow 3-2 defeat to Fnatic. 3 years later, LOUD placed first at Valorant Champions 2026 in Shanghai, the first ever team to win two Champions trophies.

LOUD Valorant roster
Players
Coaches

Handle	Name	Nationality
Erde	Lobos, Roberto	Chile
Darker	Cicuamia, Sebastián	Colombia
luk xo	Travaioli, Lucca	Brazil
DaviH	Cruz, David	Portugal
tkzin	Zimiani, Enzo	Brazil

Head coach

Gonzalo "Romanilly" Manzano

Legend:
- (I) Inactive
- (S) Suspended
- Substitute
- (injured) Injury / Illness

Latest roster transaction: 17 July 2026.

== Former divisions ==
=== Fortnite ===
In June 2020, LOUD started playing Fortnite competitions. Throughout, there were seven players who passed through the organization. In November 2022, LOUD announced their departure from the competitive Fortnite scene.

=== Vainglory ===
In March 2019, LOUD sent a team of Vainglory, representing the SA server to the WESG 2018 World Finals, the team had fr0g, MiniDookie, GwM, JuninhoMP and FalconDorian.

== Season-by-season ==
=== Free Fire ===
Year	Name	Final	Award
2019	FFPL - Season 3	2nd place	$2,176
2019	Free Fire World Series 2019	9th place	$4,000
2020	Copa América 2020	Champion	$15,000
2020	LBFF 2020: Series A - Stage 1	3rd place	$4,177
2021	LBFF 2021: Series A - Stage 1	2nd place	$15,480
2021	Free Fire World Series 2021	2nd place	$250,000
2022	LBFF 2022: Series A - Stage 1	Champion	$22,720
2022	Free Fire World Series 2022	7th place	$80,000
2022	C.O.P.A. Free Fire	2nd place	$0
2023	C.O.P.A. Free Fire	2nd place	$9,472
2023	LBFF 2023: Series A - Stage 1	Champion	$20,383
2023	Free Fire World Series 2023	7th place	$45,000
2023	ESL Snapdragon Pro Series: Challenge Season	2nd place	$6,200
2023	ESL Snapdragon Pro Series: Masters Season	4th place	$17,000
2023	FFWS Brasil: Stage 1		
2023	FFWS Brasil: Stage 2		

=== League of Legends ===
Year		CBLOL					First Stand	Mid-Season Invitational	World Championship
Year		Regular season				Playoffs	First Stand	Mid-Season Invitational	World Championship
Year		Matches	Wins	Losses	Position	Playoffs	First Stand	Mid-Season Invitational	World Championship
2021	Split 1	18	11	7	4th place	Quarterfinals		–	–
2021	Split 2	18	10	8	5th place	Quarterfinals		–	–
2022	Split 1	18	10	8	7th place	–		–	Play-In: Round 2
2022	Split 2	18	12	6	4th place	Champion		–	Play-In: Round 2
2023	Split 1	18	12	6	2nd place	Champion		Play-In: Round 2	Play-In: Round 1
2023	Split 2	18	13	5	3rd place	Champion		Play-In: Round 2	Play-In: Round 1
2024	Split 1	18	12	6	2nd place	Champion		Play-In: Round 1	–
2024	Split 2	18	10	8	4th place	Lower semifinals		Play-In: Round 1	–
2025 (Note: For the 2025 season, CBLOL was replaced by LTA South.)	Split 1	–	–	–	–	Quarterfinals	–	–	–
2025	Split 2	10	6	4	4th place	Lower quarterfinals	–	–	–
2025	Split 3	3	1	2	5th place	South Round 3	–	–	–
2026	Cup	7	3	4	4th place	Champion	Groups: Round 1		
2026	Split 1						Groups: Round 1		
2026	Split 2						Groups: Round 1		

=== Valorant ===
Year		Americas League					Masters	Champions	Other
Year		Regular season				Playoffs	Masters	Champions	Other
Year		Matches	Wins	Losses	Position	Playoffs	Masters	Champions	Other
2022 (Note: Refers to VCT: Brazil Challengers.)	Stage 1	4	4	0	1st place	Champion	Runner-up	Champion	
2022	Stage 2	4	4	0	1st place	Champion	Group stage	Champion	
2023		9	8	1	1st place	Champion	Lower Round 1	3rd place	Runner-up (LOCK//IN)
2024	Kick-off	2	2	0	1st place	Runner-up	4th place	–	
2024	Stage 1	5	2	3	3rd place	Knockout round	–	–	
2024	Stage 2	10	4	6	9th place	–		–	
2025	Kick-off	–	–	–	–	Lower quarterfinals	–	–	
2025	Stage 1	5	0	5	6th place	–	–	–	
2025	Stage 2	5	1	4	6th place	–		–	
2026	Kick-off	–	–	–	–	Lower round 1	–	Champion	
2026	Stage 1	5	3	2	4th place	Lower round 1	–	Champion	
2026	Stage 2	5	3	2	2nd place	Runner-up	–	Champion	

Year	Game Changers		Championship
Year	Name	Playoffs	Championship
2023	Game Changers Brazil Series 1	2nd place	–
2023	Game Changers Brazil Series 2	2nd place	–
2024	Game Changers Brazil Series 1	5-6th place	–
2024	Game Changers Brazil Series 2	2nd place	–
2024	Game Changers Brazil Series 3	3rd place	–

== Awards and nominations ==
Year	Ceremony	Category	Result	Ref.
2019	Prêmio eSports Brasil	Organização do Ano	Nominated	
2020	Prêmio eSports Brasil	Organização do Ano	Nominated	
2021	Esports Awards	Esports Video Production Team of the Year	Nominated	
2021	Esports Awards	Esports Organisation of the Year	Nominated	
2021	Prêmio eSports Brasil	Organização do Ano	Nominated	
2022	Esports Awards	Content Group of the Year	Nominated	
2022	Esports Awards	Esports Organisation of the Year	Nominated	
2022	Esports Awards	Esports Team of the Year	Won	
2022	Esports Awards	Esports Creative Team of the Year	Won	
2022	The Game Awards 2022	Best Esports Team	Won	
2022	Prêmio eSports Brasil	Organização do Ano	Won	
2023	Esports Awards	Esports Creative Team of the Year	Nominated	
2023	Esports Awards	Content Group of the Year	Nominated	
2023	Esports Awards	Esports Organisation of the Year	Nominated	
2023	Prêmio eSports Brasil	Organização do Ano	Won	
