= 2025 LTA season =

- League: LTA
- Sport: League of Legends
- Duration: 25 January – 23 February (Split 1); 5 April – 15 June (Split 2); 26 July – 28 September (Split 3)
- Teams: 16

Split 1
- Winners: Team Liquid
- Runners-up: 100 Thieves
- Season MVP: Sean "Yeon" Sung (Team Liquid)

Split 2
- Conference Champions: FlyQuest (North); FURIA (South)
- Runners-up: Cloud9 KIA (North) paiN Gaming (South)
- Season MVP: Kacper "Inspired" Słoma (North; FlyQuest); Marcos "CarioK" Oliveira (South; paiN Gaming)

Split 3
- Season Champions: FlyQuest
- Runners-up: Vivo Keyd Stars
- Season MVP: Kacper "Inspired" Słoma (FlyQuest)

The 2025 LTA season was the only season of the League of Legends Championship of The Americas (LTA), a Pan-American professional esports league for the video game League of Legends. The league launched with 16 teams, thirteen (13) of whom are franchised, two guest teams, and one provisional guest team, (Note: 100 Thieves is a "provisional guest team", as their franchise slot was sold back to Riot Games. For 2025, they participated like a franchised team in the LTA, meaning they can't be relegated.) all playing across three splits in line with the new three-split structure and competitive calendar introduced the game's developer Riot Games starting with the 2025 competitive season.

Team Liquid won the league's inaugural split, defeating 100 Thieves in a 3–0 sweep, qualifying for the 2025 First Stand Tournament. The first split also featured cross-conference matches in the quarterfinals, in which the Northern Conference teams won each match. In the second split, matches within the conferences were held, with FlyQuest and FURIA winning the North and South Conference Championships respectively. Both teams qualified for the 2025 Mid-Season Invitational.

FlyQuest and Vivo Keyd Stars would win their respective conferences in the final split, qualifying for the 2025 League of Legends World Championship and the LTA Playoffs, which would feature cross-conference matches. 100 Thieves also qualified for the tournament in their final appearance following its announcement that it would leave competitive League of Legends after the 2025 season. FlyQuest won the inaugural LTA Championship 3–1 over Vivo Keyd Stars. This would end up being the only LTA season, as Riot Games announced that both the League Championship Series (LCS) and Campeonato Brasileiro de League of Legends (CBLOL), which were combined along with the Liga Latinoamérica (LLA) to form the LTA, will return in 2026.

== Notable events ==
- On 11 June 2024, Riot Games announced in a blog post titled "LoL Esports: Building Towards A Brighter Future" that the League Championship Series (LCS), Campeonato Brasileiro de League of Legends (CBLOL) and Liga Latinoamérica (LLA) would plan to merge into a Pan-American league that would begin play in 2025.
- On 31 October 2024, the League of Legends Championship of The Americas was formed, with the inaugural 16 teams in the league announced that same day.
  - 100 Thieves, initially planned to be a regular partnered team coming from the former LCS, also announced on October 31 that they sold their slot back to Riot Games. As such, they would be a "provisional guest team" for the 2025 LTA season, which means they'll not be eligible for relegation but may leave competitive League at the end of the 2025 season.
- On 13 January 2025, Mark Zimmerman, who was initially the final commissioner of the LCS, was named the first (and eventually only) commissioner of the LTA.
- On 14 January 2025, Cloud9 announced a partnership with KIA America for their League of Legends division. The team is now known as Cloud9 KIA.
- On 24 January 2025, Fluxo announced a partnership with w7m esports for their League of Legends division. The team is now known as Fluxo w7m.
- On 16 March 2025, prior to the final of the 2025 First Stand Tournament, Riot Games announced that the "Fearless Draft" format would continue beyond the first split of the season. This included the LTA's Split 2 and Split 3 as well as MSI and Worlds.
- On 21 March 2025, Mark Zimmerman announced during an "LTA Address" that the formats for Splits 2 and 3 would change to align with Fearless Draft's global rollout. Split 2's regular season, initially announced as double round-robin best-of-1 group stage, was split into a single round-robin best-of-1 "positioning phase" and single round-robin best-of-3 "group stage", while Split 3's "Pick and Play" elimination stage matches were all converted to best-of-5s.
- On 19 May 2025, Japanese car manufacturer Honda would end their sponsorship of Team Liquid's League of Legends team in response to a tweet made by one of Liquid's Rainbow Six Siege players against a player on Japanese team CAG Osaka during the RE:L0:AD tournament.
- On 23 June 2025, Isurus and Estral Esports decided to part ways from their joint venture, Isurus Estral, who were in the LTA South as guests. As part of the split, Isurus would keep the LTA slot.
- On 19 July 2025, 100 Thieves confirmed its departure from the LTA after the 2025 season, with the league announcing a new partner team soon to take its place from the 2026 season onward.
- On 28 September 2025, prior to the LTA Championship Grand Finals, Riot Games announced that the LCS and CBLOL will return in 2026. The LTA was discontinued as a result.

== Guest teams ==
Two guest teams are competing in the 2025 season – Disguised from the North America Challengers League (NACL) in the United States and Isurus Estral (later just Isurus) from Argentina. Both teams will compete in a promotion and relegation tournament against the top teams from the Tier 2 leagues.

== Split 1 ==
The inaugural LTA Split began on 18 January, with the Finals held on 23 February at the newly renovated Riot Games Arena in São Paulo, Brazil.

=== Format ===
All sixteen (16) teams, eight (8) in each conference, competed in a Double-elimination tournament bracket in their respective conferences to determine the top four (4) teams each from both the LTA North and LTA South. All matches were played in best-of-threes. The remaining eight (8) then-competed in an eight-team single-elimination playoff bracket, where all matches except the finals were best-of-threes and the first round of matchups being cross-conference matches. The finals were a best-of-five series, with the winner being crowned Split 1 Champion and the lone LTA representative at the 2025 First Stand Tournament.

Split 1 implemented the "Fearless Draft" format, which was popularized by China's LoL Development League, where teams cannot pick a champion that they've already played in a series, even if the champion was picked by the opposing team. While the format was initially intended to be used only for Split 1, Riot Games later announced that it would apply for the remainder of the season.

The draw for the first round matchups in each conference were held on 18 January 2025.

=== North ===
Venue: Riot Games Arena, Los Angeles
Source: LoL Esports

Bracket 1

Round 1
25 January
FlyQuest | 2
Shopify Rebellion | 0
25 January
LYON Gaming | 0
Cloud9 KIA | 2
Lower Round 2
1 February
Shopify Rebellion | 2
LYON Gaming | 1

Round 2
2 February
FlyQuest | 1
Cloud9 KIA | 2
Round 3
Team Liquid | 2
Shopify Rebellion | 0

Advance to inter-conference playoffs
Cloud9 KIA
Team Liquid

Bracket 2

Round 1
26 January
100 Thieves | 2
Disguised | 0
26 January
Team Liquid | 2
Dignitas | 0
Lower Round 2
1 February
Disguised | 1
Dignitas | 2

Round 2
2 February
100 Thieves | 2
Team Liquid | 1
Round 3
FlyQuest | 2
Dignitas | 0

Advance to inter-conference playoffs
100 Thieves
FlyQuest

=== South ===
Venue: Riot Games Arena, São Paulo
Source: LoL Esports

Bracket 1

Round 1
25 January
paiN Gaming | 2
LOUD | 1
25 January
Vivo Keyd Stars | 1
Leviatán | 2
Lower Round 2
1 February
LOUD | 2
Vivo Keyd Stars | 1

Round 2
2 February
paiN Gaming | 1
Leviatán | 2
Round 3
9 February
LOUD | 2
RED Canids | 1

Advance to inter-conference playoffs
Leviatán
LOUD

Bracket 2

Round 1
26 January
Isurus Estral | 2
FURIA | 1
26 January
RED Canids | 2
Fluxo w7m | 0
Lower Round 2
1 February
FURIA | 2
Fluxo w7m | 0

Round 2
2 February
Isurus Estral | 2
RED Canids | 1
Round 3
9 February
FURIA | 1
paiN Gaming | 2

Advance to inter-conference playoffs
Isurus Estral
paiN Gaming

=== Playoffs ===
Venue: Riot Games Arena, São Paulo

Quarterfinals
15 February
100 Thieves | 2
paiN Gaming | 0
15 February
Leviatán | 0
FlyQuest | 2
16 February
Isurus Estral | 1
Team Liquid | 2
16 February
Cloud9 KIA | 2
LOUD | 0

Semifinals
22 February
100 Thieves | 2
FlyQuest | 1
22 February
Team Liquid | 2
Cloud9 KIA | 1

Final
23 February
100 Thieves | 0
Team Liquid | 3

== Split 2 ==
=== Format ===
In both conferences, teams competed in a single round-robin best-of-one round called the Positioning Phase. The results of this phase determined the seeding for the Group Stage, with the teams split into two groups of four and competing in a single round-robin schedule of best-of-three games. After the Group Stage, the top two teams in each group, four total, advanced to their conference's best-of-five Double-elimination tournament playoff bracket and played an additional seeding match, while the bottom two teams in each group faced each other for the final two playoff berths. The winners in each conference were crowned Conference Champions and qualified for the 2025 Mid-Season Invitational and Esports World Cup (alongside the LTA North runners-up for the latter).

=== North ===
==== Positioning phase ====
| Pos | Team | Pld | W | L | PCT |
|---|---|---|---|---|---|
| 1 | FlyQuest | 7 | 6 | 1 | .857 |
| 2 | Cloud9 KIA | 7 | 6 | 1 | .857 |
| 3 | 100 Thieves | 7 | 5 | 2 | .714 |
| 4 | Team Liquid | 7 | 4 | 3 | .571 |
| 5 | LYON | 7 | 3 | 4 | .429 |
| 6 | Shopify Rebellion | 7 | 2 | 5 | .286 |
| 7 | Disguised | 7 | 1 | 6 | .143 |
| 8 | Dignitas | 7 | 1 | 6 | .143 |

Updated to match(es) played on 6 April 2025. Source: LoL Esports

==== Group stage ====
===== Group A =====
| Pos | Team | Pld | W | L | PCT | Qualification |
|---|---|---|---|---|---|---|
| 1 | Cloud9 KIA | 3 | 3 | 0 | 1.000 | Advance to 1st Place Seeding Match |
| 2 | Team Liquid | 3 | 2 | 1 | .667 | Advance to 3rd Place Seeding Match |
| 3 | LYON | 3 | 1 | 2 | .333 | Advance to elimination matches |
| 4 | Disguised | 3 | 0 | 3 | .000 | Advance to elimination matches |

Updated to match(es) played on 12 May 2025. Source: LoL Esports

===== Group B =====
| Pos | Team | Pld | W | L | PCT | Qualification |
|---|---|---|---|---|---|---|
| 1 | FlyQuest | 3 | 3 | 0 | 1.000 | Advance to 1st Place Seeding Match |
| 2 | Shopify Rebellion | 3 | 1 | 2 | .333 | Advance to 3rd Place Seeding Match |
| 3 | 100 Thieves | 3 | 1 | 2 | .333 | Advance to elimination matches |
| 4 | Dignitas | 3 | 1 | 2 | .333 | Advance to elimination matches |

Updated to match(es) played on 12 May 2025. Source: LoL Esports

====== Tiebreaker ======
In case of teams with similar records, game scores (the cumulative number of games won and lost over multiple series) is applied. The following are the game scores for all team with 1-2 records:

- Shopify Rebellion: 4–5
- 100 Thieves: 3–4
- Dignitas: 2–5

==== Cross-group matches ====
===== Seeding matches =====
1st Place Seeding Match; 18 May
Cloud9 | 0
FlyQuest | 2

3rd Place Seeding Match; 19 May
Team Liquid | 2
Shopify Rebellion | 0

===== Elimination matches =====
Elimination Match 1; 18 May
LYON | 1
Dignitas | 2

Elimination Match 2; 19 May
100 Thieves | 2
Disguised | 0

==== Playoffs ====
Upper semifinals | Upper final | Final
24 May
1 | FlyQuest | 3
7 June
4 | Shopify Rebellion | 0
1 | FlyQuest | 3
25 May
2 | Cloud9 KIA | 2
2 | Cloud9 KIA | 3
3 | Team Liquid | 0 | 15 June
1 | FlyQuest | 3
Lower quarterfinals | Lower semifinals | Lower final | 2 | Cloud9 KIA | 2
31 May
14 June
3 | Team Liquid | 3
8 June | 2 | Cloud9 KIA | 3
5 | Dignitas | 1
3 | Team Liquid | 1 | 4 | Shopify Rebellion | 0
1 June
4 | Shopify Rebellion | 3
4 | Shopify Rebellion | 3
6 | 100 Thieves | 0

Source: LoL Esports

==== Awards ====
| Award | Player | Team |
|---|---|---|
| Finals MVP | Quad | FlyQuest |
| Season MVP | Inspired | FlyQuest |
1st All-Pro Team
| 1st All-Pro Team | Bwipo | FlyQuest |
| 1st All-Pro Team | Inspired | FlyQuest |
| 1st All-Pro Team | Quad | FlyQuest |
| 1st All-Pro Team | Massu | FlyQuest |
| 1st All-Pro Team | Busio | FlyQuest |
2nd All-Pro Team
| 2nd All-Pro Team | Thanatos | Cloud9 KIA |
| 2nd All-Pro Team | Blaber | Cloud9 KIA |
| 2nd All-Pro Team | Quid | 100 Thieves |
| 2nd All-Pro Team | Zven | Cloud9 KIA |
| 2nd All-Pro Team | Vulcan | Cloud9 KIA |
3rd All-Pro Team
| 3rd All-Pro Team | Impact | Team Liquid |
| 3rd All-Pro Team | River | 100 Thieves |
| 3rd All-Pro Team | Loki | Cloud9 KIA |
| 3rd All-Pro Team | Yeon | Team Liquid |
| 3rd All-Pro Team | CoreJJ | Team Liquid |

=== South ===
==== Positioning phase ====
| Pos | Team | Pld | W | L | PCT |
|---|---|---|---|---|---|
| 1 | paiN Gaming | 7 | 6 | 1 | .857 |
| 2 | FURIA | 7 | 5 | 2 | .714 |
| 3 | LOUD | 7 | 4 | 3 | .571 |
| 4 | Leviatán | 7 | 4 | 3 | .571 |
| 5 | Vivo Keyd Stars | 7 | 4 | 3 | .571 |
| 6 | RED Canids | 7 | 3 | 4 | .429 |
| 7 | Fluxo w7m | 7 | 1 | 6 | .143 |
| 8 | Isurus Estral | 7 | 1 | 6 | .143 |

Updated to match(es) played on 22 April 2025. Source: LoL Esports

==== Group stage ====
===== Group A =====
| Pos | Team | Pld | W | L | PCT | Qualification |
|---|---|---|---|---|---|---|
| 1 | paiN Gaming | 3 | 3 | 0 | 1.000 | Advance to 1st Place Seeding Match |
| 2 | Vivo Keyd Stars | 3 | 2 | 1 | .667 | Advance to 3rd Place Seeding Match |
| 3 | Isurus Estral | 3 | 1 | 2 | .333 | Advance to elimination matches |
| 4 | Leviatán | 3 | 0 | 3 | .000 | Advance to elimination matches |

Updated to match(es) played on 12 May 2025. Source: LoL Esports

===== Group B =====
| Pos | Team | Pld | W | L | PCT | Qualification |
|---|---|---|---|---|---|---|
| 1 | FURIA | 3 | 2 | 1 | .667 | Advance to 1st Place Seeding Match |
| 2 | LOUD | 3 | 2 | 1 | .667 | Advance to 3rd Place Seeding Match |
| 3 | RED Canids | 3 | 1 | 2 | .333 | Advance to elimination matches |
| 4 | Fluxo w7m | 3 | 1 | 2 | .333 | Advance to elimination matches |

Updated to match(es) played on 12 May 2025. Source: LoL Esports

====== Tiebreaker ======
In case of teams with similar records, game scores (the cumulative number of games won and lost over multiple series) is applied, with RED Canids taking the third place spot with a 3–4 game score as opposed to Fluxo w7m's 2–5. FURIA and LOUD, however, have an identical 5–3 game score, but FURIA takes the top spot due to their win against LOUD in group play.

==== Cross-group matches ====
===== Seeding matches =====
1st Place Seeding Match; 17 May
paiN Gaming | 2
FURIA | 1

3rd Place Seeding Match; 18 May
Vivo Keyd Stars | 2
LOUD | 1

===== Elimination matches =====
Elimination Match 1 May 18
Isurus Estral | 2
Fluxo w7m | 0

Elimination Match 2 May 19
RED Canids | 2
Leviatán | 0

==== Playoffs ====
Upper semifinals | Upper final | Final
24 May
1 | paiN Gaming | 3
8 June
4 | LOUD | 1
1 | paiN Gaming | 3
25 May
2 | FURIA | 1
2 | FURIA | 3
3 | Vivo Keyd Stars | 0 | 15 June
1 | paiN Gaming | 0
Lower quarterfinals | Lower semifinals | Lower final | 2 | FURIA | 3
1 June
14 June
3 | Vivo Keyd Stars | 3
7 June | 2 | FURIA | 3
5 | RED Canids | 1
3 | Vivo Keyd Stars | 0 | 6 | Isurus Estral | 1
31 May
6 | Isurus Estral | 3
4 | LOUD | 1
6 | Isurus Estral | 3

Source: LoL Esports

==== Awards ====
| Award | Player | Team |
|---|---|---|
| Finals MVP | Guigo | FURIA |
| Season MVP | CarioK | paiN Gaming |
1st All-Pro Team
| 1st All-Pro Team | Wizer | paiN Gaming |
| 1st All-Pro Team | CarioK | paiN Gaming |
| 1st All-Pro Team | Tutsz | FURIA |
| 1st All-Pro Team | Titan | paIN Gaming |
| 1st All-Pro Team | Kuri | paIN Gaming |
2nd All-Pro Team
| 2nd All-Pro Team | Guigo | FURIA |
| 2nd All-Pro Team | Tatu | FURIA |
| 2nd All-Pro Team | Roamer | paIN Gaming |
| 2nd All-Pro Team | Ayu | FURIA |
| 2nd All-Pro Team | Trymbi | Vivo Keyd Stars |
3rd All-Pro Team
| 3rd All-Pro Team | Robo | LOUD |
| 3rd All-Pro Team | Disamis | Vivo Keyd Stars |
| 3rd All-Pro Team | Mireu | Isurus Estral |
| 3rd All-Pro Team | Brance | RED Canids |
| 3rd All-Pro Team | Jojo | FURIA |

== Split 3 ==
On 3 June 2025, Riot Games announced that the final two games of the Americas Regional Championship (also known as the LTA Championship Finals) will be held at the Credit Union of Texas Event Center in Allen, Texas in the Dallas–Fort Worth metroplex in the United States on 27–28 September.

=== Format ===
Split 3 will have a "Pick & Play" format for the initial stages of the split. Both conferences will have a similar format across seven (7) weeks of play. The first week sees each team face each other based on the second split results, but after which, the lowest-ranked teams pick their opponents. After the first three weeks, a double elimination bracket is formed for the remaining four (4) weeks called the "Elimination Phase", with the top 4 teams seeded into the winner's bracket and the bottom 4 seeded into the loser's bracket. This bracket sees the best ranked teams pick their opponents for the first two rounds.

After those two rounds, the bracket will go on as is, with the top three teams in each conference's elimination phase qualifying for the Americas Regional Championship. The winner of each bracket per conference will earn a slot at the 2025 League of Legends World Championship as conference champions. All games in "Pick and Play"'s first three weeks are best-of-threes, while the double-elimination bracket "Elimination Phase" is consisted entirely of best-of-fives.

In the Americas Regional Championship, the three remaining teams from each of the two conferences compete in a best-of-five Double elimination tournament bracket, with the winners of each conference (the first two LTA representatives at Worlds 2025) starting in the upper bracket, with the remaining teams starting in the lower bracket. The winner of the finals will be crowned the inaugural LTA Champion, with the final LTA spot for Worlds 2025 being determined by the final rankings.

=== Pick & play phase ===
North

| Pos | Team | Pld | W | L | PCT |
|---|---|---|---|---|---|
| 1 | Cloud9 KIA | 3 | 3 | 0 | 1.000 |
| 2 | FlyQuest | 3 | 3 | 0 | 1.000 |
| 3 | Shopify Rebellion | 3 | 3 | 0 | 1.000 |
| 4 | Team Liquid | 3 | 1 | 2 | .333 |
| 5 | Disguised | 3 | 1 | 2 | .333 |
| 6 | LYON | 3 | 1 | 2 | .333 |
| 7 | Dignitas | 3 | 0 | 3 | .000 |
| 8 | 100 Thieves | 3 | 0 | 3 | .000 |

Updated to match(es) played on 10 August 2025. Source: LoL Esports

Progression

| Team | Week 1 | Week 2 | Week 3 |
|---|---|---|---|
| 100 Thieves | TL (L) | FLY (L) | SR (L) |
| Cloud9 KIA | LYON (W) | DIG (W) | TL (W) |
| Dignitas | SR (L) | C9 (L) | DSG (L) |
| Disguised | FLY (L) | SR (L) | DIG (W) |
| FlyQuest | DSG (W) | 100T (W) | LYON (W) |
| LYON | C9 (L) | TL (W) | FLY (L) |
| Shopify Rebellion | DIG (W) | DSG (W) | 100T (W) |
| Team Liquid | 100T (W) | LYON (L) | C9 (L) |

South

| Pos | Team | Pld | W | L | PCT |
|---|---|---|---|---|---|
| 1 | RED Canids | 3 | 3 | 0 | 1.000 |
| 2 | FURIA | 3 | 2 | 1 | .667 |
| 3 | Vivo Keyd Stars | 3 | 2 | 1 | .667 |
| 4 | paiN Gaming | 3 | 2 | 1 | .667 |
| 5 | LOUD | 3 | 1 | 2 | .333 |
| 6 | Isurus | 3 | 1 | 2 | .333 |
| 7 | Leviatán | 3 | 1 | 2 | .333 |
| 8 | Fluxo w7m | 3 | 0 | 3 | .000 |

Updated to match(es) played on 10 August 2025. Source: LoL Esports

Progression

| Team | Week 1 | Week 2 | Week 3 |
|---|---|---|---|
| Fluxo w7m | FUR (L) | ISG (L) | LEV (L) |
| FURIA | FXW7 (W) | PNG (L) | VKS (W) |
| Isurus | RED (L) | FXW7 (W) | LLL (L) |
| Leviatán | PNG (L) | VKS (L) | FXW7 (W) |
| LOUD | VKS (L) | RED (L) | ISG (W) |
| paiN Gaming | LEV (W) | FUR (W) | RED (L) |
| RED Canids | ISG (W) | LLL (W) | PNG (W) |
| Vivo Keyd Stars | LLL (W) | LEV (W) | FUR (L) |

=== Elimination phase ===
North

Round 1
23 August
Disguised | 3
Dignitas | 1
24 August
LYON | 1
100 Thieves | 3

Round 2
16 August
Cloud9 KIA | 2
Shopify Rebellion | 3
17 August
FlyQuest | 3
Team Liquid | 0
30 August
Team Liquid | 0
100 Thieves | 3
29 August
Cloud9 KIA | 3
Disguised | 2

Round 3
5 September
100 Thieves | 3
Cloud9 KIA | 2

Round 4
31 August
Shopify Rebellion | 1
FlyQuest | 3
6 September
Shopify Rebellion | 0
100 Thieves | 3

Conference Finals
7 September
FlyQuest | 3
100 Thieves | 1

Source: LoL Esports

South

Round 1
23 August
LOUD | 3
Fluxo w7m | 0
24 August
Isurus | 2
Leviatán | 3

Round 2
16 August
FURIA | 0
Vivo Keyd Stars | 3
17 August
RED Canids | 1
paiN Gaming | 3
29 August
RED Canids | 3
Leviatán | 1
30 August
LOUD | 3
FURIA | 0

Round 3
5 September
RED Canids | 3
LOUD | 2

Round 4
31 August
Vivo Keyd Stars | 3
paiN Gaming | 1
6 September
paiN Gaming | 0
RED Canids | 3

Conference Finals
7 September
Vivo Keyd Stars | 3
RED Canids | 0

Source: LoL Esports

=== Playoffs ===
Venues:

- Riot Games Arena, Los Angeles (Rounds 1–2, Upper Bracket Final)
- Credit Union of Texas Event Center, Dallas (Lower Bracket Final and Finals)

Round 1
13 September – Los Angeles
100 Thieves | 3
paiN Gaming | 0
14 September – Los Angeles
RED Canids | 3
Shopify Rebellion | 2

Round 2
21 September – Los Angeles
100 Thieves | 3
RED Canids | 0

Round 3
20 September – Los Angeles
FlyQuest | 3
Vivo Keyd Stars | 0
27 September – Dallas
Vivo Keyd Stars | 3
100 Thieves | 1

Finals
28 September – Dallas
FlyQuest | 3
Vivo Keyd Stars | 1

Source: LoL Esports

=== Awards ===
- Player of the Year: Kacper "Inspired" Słoma (FlyQuest)
- Finals MVP: Alan "Busio" Cwalina (FlyQuest)
- Rookie of the Year
  - Lee "Loki" Sang-min (Cloud9 KIA; North)
  - Pedro "Tatu" Seixas (FURIA; South)

North

| Award | Player | Team |
|---|---|---|
1st All-Pro Team
| 1st All-Pro Team | Bwipo | FlyQuest |
| 1st All-Pro Team | Inspired | FlyQuest |
| 1st All-Pro Team | Quid | 100 Thieves |
| 1st All-Pro Team | Massu | FlyQuest |
| 1st All-Pro Team | Busio | FlyQuest |
2nd All-Pro Team
| 2nd All-Pro Team | Thanatos | Cloud9 KIA |
| 2nd All-Pro Team | River | 100 Thieves |
| 2nd All-Pro Team | Quad | FlyQuest |
| 2nd All-Pro Team | Yeon | Team Liquid |
| 2nd All-Pro Team | Vulcan | Cloud9 KIA |
3rd All-Pro Team
| 3rd All-Pro Team | Fudge | Shopify Rebellion |
| 3rd All-Pro Team | Contractz | Shopify Rebellion |
| 3rd All-Pro Team | Loki | Cloud9 KIA |
| 3rd All-Pro Team | Bvoy | Shopify Rebellion |
| 3rd All-Pro Team | Eyla | 100 Thieves |

South

| Award | Player | Team |
|---|---|---|
1st All-Pro Team
| 1st All-Pro Team | fNb | RED Canids |
| 1st All-Pro Team | Disamis | Vivo Keyd Stars |
| 1st All-Pro Team | Mireu | Vivo Keyd Stars |
| 1st All-Pro Team | Morttheus | Vivo Keyd Stars |
| 1st All-Pro Team | Trymbi | Vivo Keyd Stars |
2nd All-Pro Team
| 2nd All-Pro Team | Boal | Vivo Keyd Stars |
| 2nd All-Pro Team | DOOM | RED Canids |
| 2nd All-Pro Team | Kaze | RED Canids |
| 2nd All-Pro Team | TitaN | paiN Gaming |
| 2nd All-Pro Team | frost | RED Canids |
3rd All-Pro Team
| 3rd All-Pro Team | Robo | LOUD |
| 3rd All-Pro Team | Tatu | FURIA |
| 3rd All-Pro Team | Roamer | paiN Gaming |
| 3rd All-Pro Team | Rabelo | RED Canids |
| 3rd All-Pro Team | RedBert | LOUD |

== Promotion and relegation tournament ==
The two guest teams – Disguised (North) and Isurus (South), as well as teams from the second-tier leagues will compete in a five-team double-elimination tournament per conference. The winners of both tournaments will qualify for the 2026 LCS and CBLOL seasons respectively as guest teams.

=== Qualified teams ===
North (LCS)

| Team | League | Path |
|---|---|---|
| Disguised | LTA North | Guest team |
| Luminosity Gaming | North American Challengers League | Split 2 playoffs top two teams |
| Conviction | North American Challengers League | Split 2 playoffs top two teams |
| Estral Esports | Liga Regional Norte | Split 2 playoffs top two teams |
| SDM Tigres | Liga Regional Norte | Split 2 playoffs top two teams |

South (CBLOL)

| Team | League | Path |
|---|---|---|
| Isurus | LTA South | Guest team |
| Alpha7 Esports | Circuito Desafiante | Split 2 playoffs #2 and #3 (Note: Vivo Keyd Stars Academy won the Split 2 title but are the academy team of Vivo Keyd Stars of the LTA South) |
| Flamengo MDL | Circuito Desafiante | Split 2 playoffs #2 and #3 |
| Farenvehn | Liga Regional Sur | Split 2 playoffs top two teams |
| Sicar Esports | Liga Regional Sur | Split 2 playoffs top two teams |

=== North (LCS) ===
Round 1
4 October
Conviction | 2
Estral Esports | 3

Round 2
5 October
Luminosity Gaming | 3
SDM Tigres | 0
6–7 October
Disguised | 3
Estral Esports | 1
SDM Tigres | 0
Estral Esports | 3

Round 3
Luminosity Gaming | 0
Disguised | 3
Luminosity Gaming | 3
Estral Esports | 0

Promotion Match
12 October
Disguised | 3
Luminosity Gaming | 1

=== South (CBLoL) ===
Round 1
30 September
Flamengo MDL | 3
Sicar Esports | 0

Round 2
1 October
Alpha7 Esports | 3
Farenvehn | 1
2 October
Isurus | 3
Flamengo MDL | 2
3 October
Farenvehn | 2
Flamengo MDL | 3

Round 3
4 October
Alpha7 Esports | 0
Isurus | 3
5 October
Alpha7 Esports | 3
Flamengo MDL | 2

Promotion Match
8 October
Isurus | 3
Alpha7 Esports | 0
