= 2025 First Stand Tournament =

League of Legends esports tournament

Tournament information
- Sport: League of Legends
- Location: South Korea
- Dates: 10–16 March
- Administrator: Riot Games
- Host: Seoul
- Venue: LoL Park
- Teams: 5
- Purse: US$1,000,000

Final positions
- Champions: Hanwha Life Esports
- Runner-up: Karmine Corp
- MVP: Kim "Zeka" Geon-woo (Hanwha Life Esports)

The 2025 First Stand Tournament was the inaugural First Stand Tournament (FST) – a League of Legends tournament organized by publisher Riot Games at the conclusion of the first of three splits in the current competitive calendar of the game's professional esports scene. The inaugural tournament was held in South Korea from 10 to 16 March 2025.

Hanwha Life Esports of the League of Legends Champions Korea (LCK) won the tournament by defeating League of Legends EMEA Championship (LEC) representatives Karmine Corp with a score 3-1 in the final, marking the organization's first international title.

== Qualification ==
Five teams from each of the five major professional regions, namely the League of Legends Champions Korea (LCK), League of Legends Pro League (LPL), League of Legends EMEA Championship (LEC), League of Legends Championship of The Americas (LTA), and the League of Legends Championship Pacific (LCP), qualified through winning their respective splits.

This would be the first and only First Stand Tournament featuring the LTA, a merger between the League Championship Series (LCS), Campeonato Brasileiro de League of Legends (CBLOL), and Liga Latinoamérica (LLA). The LTA was announced to be discontinued on 28 September 2025, with the LCS and CBLOL returning in 2026.

=== Qualified teams ===
On 23 February 2025, Hanwha Life Esports of the LCK, CTBC Flying Oyster of the LCP, and Team Liquid of the LTA, all qualified on the same day after winning their respective splits. This was followed by Top Esports of the LPL, qualifying for the tournament on 1 March, with Karmine Corp of the LEC being the final team to advance to FST after winning the Winter Split over G2 Esports the day after, qualifying for a League of Legends international competition for the first time in the organization's history. Notably, this snaps G2 Esports' streak of qualifying for six consecutive international tournaments, dating back to the 2022 Mid-Season Invitational. Also, this has been the worst performance for LPL in cross-region tournaments.

Region	League	Path	Team
China	LPL	Stage 1 winner	Top Esports
South Korea	LCK	LCK Cup champion	Hanwha Life Esports
EMEA	LEC	Winter champion	Karmine Corp
Americas	LTA	Split 1 champion	Team Liquid
Asia-Pacific	LCP	Qualifying Series winner	CTBC Flying Oyster

== Venue ==
The LoL Park in Seoul, which is the main studio of the LCK, was chosen to host the tournament's inaugural edition on 1 November 2024 during the media day for the 2024 League of Legends World Championship Final at The O2 Arena in London, United Kingdom.

Seoul, South Korea
LoL Park
Capacity: 450
2025 First Stand Tournament (South Korea)

== Format ==
The tournament was the first international event to adapt the Fearless Draft format, where teams cannot pick a champion that they've already played in a series, even if the opposing team already picked that champion. The five qualified teams were placed in a single round-robin best of 3 group; teams could which side of Summoner's Rift they want to be on for two of their series, while their opposing teams had the choice during the other two series. The top four teams then advances to the knockout stage, which was a single-elimination best of 5 bracket. The winner of the Final is crowned FST champion and gives their region's two representatives automatic advancement or byes to the 2025 Mid-Season Invitational's Bracket Stage.

== Group Stage ==
Pos	Team	Pld	W	L	PCT	Qualification
1	Hanwha Life Esports	4	4	0	1.000	Advance to playoffs
2	CTBC Flying Oyster	4	3	1	.750	Advance to playoffs
3	Karmine Corp	4	1	3	.250	Advance to playoffs
4	Top Esports	4	1	3	.250	Advance to playoffs
5	Team Liquid	4	1	3	.250	

Updated to match(es) played on 14 March 2025. Source: LoL Esports

Match 1	10 March	Team Liquid	2	–	1	Karmine Corp	Seoul, South Korea
	17:00 (UTC+9)						LoL Park
		Kills: 20; Turrets: 8 Gold: 61.3K; Baron: 1 Dragons: 4	Game 1; 32:01; TL leads series 1-0			Kills: 2 Turrets: 3 Gold: 50.6K; Baron: 0 Dragons: 1	
		Kills: 5 Turrets: 1 Gold: 36.6K; Baron: 0 Dragons: 1	Game 2; 23:20; Series tied 1-1			Kills: 20; Turrets: 9 Gold: 47.9K; Baron: 0 Dragons: 2	
		Kills: 19; Turrets: 10; Gold: 68.1K; Baron: 1 Dragons: 3	Game 3; 34:25; TL wins series 2-1			Kills: 3 Turrets: 1 Gold: 53.3K; Baron: 0 Dragons: 2	

Match 2	10 March	Hanwha Life Esports	2	–	0	Top Esports	Seoul, South Korea
	20:00 (UTC+9)						LoL Park
		Kills: 16; Turrets: 8 Gold: 55.9K; Baron: 1 Dragons: 2	Game 1; 28:59; HLE leads series 1-0			Kills: 7 Turrets: 2 Gold: 48.2K; Baron: 0 Dragons: 2	
		Kills: 21; Turrets: 8 Gold: 62K; Baron: 1 Dragons: 3	Game 2; 31:33; HLE wins series 2-0			Kills: 6 Turrets: 2 Gold: 50.6K; Baron: 0 Dragons: 1	

Match 3	11 March	CTBC Flying Oyster	2	–	0	Karmine Corp	Seoul, South Korea
	17:00 (UTC+9)						LoL Park
		Kills: 15; Turrets: 10; Gold: 57.8K; Baron: 1 Dragons: 4	Game 1; 29:54; CFO leads series 1-0			Kills: 7 Turrets: 2 Gold: 49.2K; Baron: 0 Dragons: 0	
		Kills: 22; Turrets: 11; Gold: 69.3K; Baron: 2 Dragons: 2	Game 2; 33:53; CFO wins series 2-0			Kills: 9 Turrets: 3 Gold: 58.8K; Baron: 0 Dragons: 2	

Match 4	11 March	Team Liquid	0	–	2	Top Esports	Seoul, South Korea
	20:00 (UTC+9)						LoL Park
		Kills: 11; Turrets: 1 Gold: 50.2K; Baron: 0 Dragons: 1	Game 1; 31:04; TES leads series 1-0			Kills: 25; Turrets: 8 Gold: 64.5K; Baron: 1 Dragons: 2	
		Kills: 7 Turrets: 1 Gold: 42.2K; Baron: 0 Dragons: 0	Game 2; 27:15; TES wins series 2-0			Kills: 23; Turrets: 10; Gold: 55.8K; Baron: 0 Dragons: 2	

Match 5	12 March	CTBC Flying Oyster	0	–	2	Hanwha Life Esports	Seoul, South Korea
	17:00 (UTC+9)						LoL Park
		Kills: 4 Turrets: 1 Gold: 37.1K; Baron: 0 Dragons: 0	Game 1; 23:58; HLE leads series 1-0			Kills: 19; Turrets: 9 Gold: 49.3K; Baron: 0 Dragons: 3	
		Kills: 11; Turrets: 1 Gold: 47.2K; Baron: 0 Dragons: 0	Game 2; 27:50; HLE wins series 2-0			Kills: 22; Turrets: 8 Gold: 60.2K; Baron: 1 Dragons: 4	

Match 6	12 March	Karmine Corp	2	–	0	Top Esports	Seoul, South Korea
	20:00 (UTC+9)						LoL Park
		Kills: 33; Turrets: 9 Gold: 66.5K; Baron: 1 Dragons: 5	Game 1; 31:53; KC leads series 1-0			Kills: 16; Turrets: 4 Gold: 59.2K; Baron: 0 Dragons: 0	
		Kills: 18; Turrets: 10; Gold: 62.3K; Baron: 1 Dragons: 3	Game 2; 31:06; KC wins series 2-0			Kills: 5 Turrets: 3 Gold: 52.2K; Baron: 0 Dragons: 1	

Match 7	13 March	Team Liquid	0	–	2	CTBC Flying Oyster	Seoul, South Korea
	17:00 (UTC+9)						LoL Park
		Kills: 5 Turrets: 3 Gold: 47.7K; Baron: 0 Dragons: 0	Game 1; 29:14; CFO leads series 1-0			Kills: 13; Turrets: 7 Gold: 54.7K; Baron: 1 Dragons: 4	
		Kills: 9 Turrets: 2 Gold: 54K; Baron: 0 Dragons: 1	Game 2; 33:06; CFO wins series 2-0			Kills: 20; Turrets: 10; Gold: 67K; Baron: 1 Dragons: 3	

Match 8	13 March	Karmine Corp	1	–	2	Hanwha Life Esports	Seoul, South Korea
	20:00 (UTC+9)						LoL Park
		Kills: 11; Turrets: 3 Gold: 60.3K; Baron: 0 Dragons: 2	Game 1; 35:24; HLE leads series 1-0			Kills: 20; Turrets: 10; Gold: 70.5K; Baron: 1 Dragons: 3	
		Kills: 24; Turrets: 9 Gold: 84.8K; Baron: 2 Dragons: 2	Game 2; 41:16; Series tied 1-1			Kills: 23; Turrets: 10; Gold: 78.8K; Baron: 1 Dragons: 4	
		Kills: 10; Turrets: 1 Gold: 51.1K; Baron: 0 Dragons: 2	Game 3; 30:15; HLE wins series 2-1			Kills: 20; Turrets: 10; Gold: 62.4K; Baron: 1 Dragons: 2	

Match 9	14 March	CTBC Flying Oyster	2	–	0	Top Esports	Seoul, South Korea
	17:00 (UTC+9)						LoL Park
		Kills: 19; Turrets: 10; Gold: 56.3K; Baron: 0 Dragons: 2	Game 1; 29:17; CFO leads series 1-0			Kills: 3 Turrets: 2 Gold: 47.2K; Baron: 0 Dragons: 3	
		Kills: 21; Turrets: 8 Gold: 62.6K; Baron: 1 Dragons: 3	Game 2; 31:36; CFO wins series 2-0			Kills: 12; Turrets: 2 Gold: 53.8K; Baron: 0 Dragons: 1	

Match 10	14 March	Team Liquid	1	–	2	Hanwha Life Esports	Seoul, South Korea
	20:00 (UTC+9)						LoL Park
		Kills: 13; Turrets: 2 Gold: 46.1K; Baron: 0 Dragons: 1	Game 1; 27:34; HLE leads series 1-0			Kills: 22; Turrets: 7 Gold: 59.3K; Baron: 1 Dragons: 2	
		Kills: 20; Turrets: 7 Gold: 63.9K; Baron: 0 Dragons: 5	Game 2; 34:28; Series tied 1-1			Kills: 13; Turrets: 5 Gold: 63.1K; Baron: 1 Dragons: 0	
		Kills: 3 Turrets: 1 Gold: 41K; Baron: 0 Dragons: 2	Game 3; 27:36; HLE wins series 2-1			Kills: 25; Turrets: 10; Gold: 57K; Baron: 1 Dragons: 1	

=== Tiebreakers ===
- Tiebreakers are based on the number of games won, but not necessarily series won.
- Karmine Corp was placed third by winning three games (1-2 vs Team Liquid; 2-0 vs Top Esports)
- Top Esports was placed fourth by winning two games (2-0) against Team Liquid.
- Team Liquid also won two games, but were eliminated due to three losses incurred (2-1 vs Karmine Corp, 0-2 vs Top Esports), and due to head-to-head matches against Top Esports and Karmine Corp.

== Knockout Stage ==
- Date and time: 15–16 March, start time at 13:00 KST (UTC+9)
- All matches are best-of-five.
- The winning region will receive two automatic byes to the 2025 Mid-Season Invitational Bracket Stage

Semifinals
15 March, 13:00 KST
2	CTBC Flying Oyster	2
3	Karmine Corp	3
15 March, 18:00 KST
1	Hanwha Life Esports	3
4	Top Esports	0

Final
16 March, 17:00 KST
3	Karmine Corp	1
1	Hanwha Life Esports	3

=== Semifinals ===
13:00 (UTC+9)	15 March	CTBC Flying Oyster	2	–	3	Karmine Corp	Seoul, South Korea
							LoL Park
		Kills: 3 Turrets: 4 Gold: 56.2K; Baron: 0 Dragons: 1	Game 1; 35:07; KC leads series 1-0			Kills: 13; Turrets: 11; Gold: 71.3K; Baron: 2 Dragons: 5	
		Kills: 1 Turrets: 1 Gold: 41.9K; Baron: 0 Dragons: 1	Game 2; 28:26; KC leads series 2-0			Kills: 24; Turrets: 11; Gold: 61.2K; Baron: 1 Dragons: 3	
		Kills: 22; Turrets: 10; Gold: 64.3K; Baron: 1 Dragons: 3	Game 3; 31:32; KC leads series 2-1			Kills: 12; Turrets: 2 Gold: 55.7K; Baron: 0 Dragons: 1	
		Kills: 14; Turrets: 9 Gold: 57.9K; Baron: 1 Dragons: 4	Game 4; 30:13; Series tied 2-2			Kills: 5 Turrets: 4 Gold: 50.5K; Baron: 0 Dragons: 1	
		Kills: 13; Turrets: 4 Gold: 68.6K; Baron: 0 Dragons: 3	Game 5; 39:28; KC wins series 3-2			Kills: 18; Turrets: 10; Gold: 74.1K; Baron: 1 Dragons: 3	

18:00 (UTC+9)	15 March	Hanwha Life Esports	3	–	0	Top Esports	Seoul, South Korea
							LoL Park
		Kills: 17; Turrets: 6 Gold: 56K; Baron: 0 Dragons: 1	Game 1; 29:13; HLE leads series 1-0			Kills: 6 Turrets: 2 Gold: 48.9K; Baron: 0 Dragons: 2	
		Kills: 38; Turrets: 10; Gold: 62.9K; Baron: 1 Dragons: 2	Game 2; 28:50; HLE leads series 2-0			Kills: 14; Turrets: 3 Gold: 48.8K; Baron: 0 Dragons: 1	
		Kills: 22; Turrets: 8 Gold: 64.8K; Baron: 1 Dragons: 4	Game 3; 33:55; HLE wins series 3-0			Kills: 12; Turrets: 3 Gold: 58.1K; Baron: 0 Dragons: 1	

=== Final ===
17:00 (UTC+9)	16 March	Karmine Corp	1	–	3	Hanwha Life Esports	Seoul, South Korea
							LoL Park
		Kills: 22; Turrets: 7 Gold: 69.6K; Baron: 1 Dragons: 3	Game 1; 36:11; KC leads series 1-0			Kills: 17; Turrets: 3 Gold: 63K; Baron: 0 Dragons: 2	
		Kills: 2 Turrets: 0 Gold: 43.8K; Baron: 0 Dragons: 0	Game 2; 29:57; Series tied 1-1			Kills: 11; Turrets: 9 Gold: 57.9K; Baron: 1 Dragons: 4	
		Kills: 11; Turrets: 1 Gold: 45.2K; Baron: 0 Dragons: 0	Game 3; 27:03; HLE leads series 2-1			Kills: 28; Turrets: 10; Gold: 59.4K; Baron: 1 Dragons: 4	
		Kills: 10; Turrets: 0 Gold: 60.8K; Baron: 0 Dragons: 2	Game 4; 35:52; HLE wins series 3-1			Kills: 22; Turrets: 13; Gold: 74.1K; Baron: 2 Dragons: 3	

== Final standings ==
A base prize pool of US$1,000,000 was offered for the tournament.

Place	Team	GS	SF	Finals	Prize (%)	Prize (USD)
1st	Hanwha Life Esports	4–0	3–0	3–1	30%	$300,000
2nd	Karmine Corp	1–3	3–2	1–3	22.5%	$225,000
3rd–4th	CTBC Flying Oyster	3–1	2–3	–	17.25%	$172,500
3rd–4th	Top Esports	1–3	0–3	–	17.25%	$172,500
5th	Team Liquid	1–3	–	–	13%	$130,000
Place	Team	GS	SF	Finals	Prize (%)	Prize (USD)

== Marketing ==
The tournament's official slogan, Yours For the Taking, was unveiled on 9 January 2025 alongside a format explainer video on YouTube.

== Sponsorship ==
=== Global Partners ===
- Amazon Web Services
- Esports World Cup
- Cisco
- HyperX
- Mastercard
- Mercedes-Benz
- HP Omen
- Opera GX
- Oppo
- Red Bull
- Secretlab
- Verizon

== Impact ==
Although Fearless Draft was initially intended for just the first split of the season and the First Stand Tournament, it was announced prior to the First Stand final on 16 March 2025 that it would be adopted for the rest of the 2025 competitive calendar, including the Mid-Season Invitational and World Championship. Fearless Draft was also confirmed for the entirety of the 2026 season.
