= Furia Esports =

Brazilian esports organization

Furia
- Short name: FUR
- Divisions: Counter-Strike 2 League of Legends; Rocket League; Valorant; Rainbow Six Siege; Apex Legends; Super Smash Bros. Kings League
- Founded: 8 August 2017; 9 years ago
- Location: São Paulo, Brazil; United States (Apex Legends team)
- Colors
- Owner: Jaime Pádua; André Akkari; Cris Guedes
- Partners: Adidas, Universidade Cruzeiro do Sul, PokerStars, Red Bull, Hellmann's, Betnacional and Lenovo
- Website: www.furia.gg

Furia (stylized as FURIA or FURIA Esports) is a Brazilian professional esports organization. Furia competes in Counter-Strike 2, Rocket League, League of Legends, Valorant, Rainbow Six: Siege, Apex Legends and Kings League. In 2022, Furia was named the fifth most currently successful esports organization in the world by the North American portal Nerd Street.

== History ==
Furia was founded in February 2017 by businessman Jaime Pádua, who was planning to invest in electronic sports, and entrepreneurs André Akkari (professional poker player) and Cris Guedes. These two had similar plans and gave Jaime the ability to structure the project.

On May 6, 2024, the Esports World Cup Foundation, funded by the Saudi Arabia Public Investment Fund and organizers of the Esports World Cup tournament series, announced the 30 organizations (known in the ESWC as Clubs) who would make up the Club Support Program, with Furia being one of them. This program gives teams a one-time six-figure stipend if an organization is willing to enter new esports as well as additional funding each year if they drive viewership and fan engagement to the Esports World Cup.

== Counter-Strike 2 ==
=== History ===
FURIA's Counter-Strike division would make their first appearance at a Major two years after their founding at IEM Katowice Major 2019, although they were eliminated in the New Challengers Stage. FURIA continued to improve for the rest of the year, challenging MIBR as the best team in Brazil and finishing second at ECS Season 7.

FURIA was the highest seeded team from the Americas region going into PGL Major Stockholm 2021, and were eliminated in the quarterfinals. They were also eliminated in the quarterfinals of PGL Major Antwerp 2022. On October 7, 2022, FURIA qualified to the IEM Rio Major 2022 through the Americas RMR. In front of the home crowd, FURIA exceeded expectations and reached the semifinals, until then its best placement in a Major. In 2023, IHC Esports defeated FURIA 2–1 and advanced to the group stage of IEM Katowice.

At BLAST Rivals Hong Kong in November 2026, FURIA came from a map down to defeat pre-match favourites Team Vitality 2–1. Their 13–0 victory on Mirage was Vitality’s first map defeat without a round in Counter-Strike 2. FURIA then defeated Team Spirit 3–0 in the final to defend their Hong Kong title and win their third trophy in four events.

=== Achievements ===
- (gold) ESL Pro League Season 12: North America
- (gold) FISSURE Playground 2
- (gold) Thunderpick World Championship 2025
- (gold) Intel Extreme Masters Chengdu 2025
- (gold) BLAST Rivals 2025 Season 2
- (silver) ECS Season 7 - Finals
- (silver) IEM Kraków 2026
- (silver) IEM Cologne Major 2026
- (bronze) ESL Pro League Season 11: North America
- 3rd/4th — BLAST Open London 2025
- 3rd/4th — IEM Rio Major 2022
- 3rd/4th — Intel Extreme Masters Season XVII - Dallas
- 3rd/4th — ESL Pro League Season 15
- 3rd/4th — ESL Pro League Season 13
- 3rd/4th — Dreamhack Masters Dallas 2019
- 5th-8th — PGL Major Antwerp 2022
- 5th-8th — PGL Major Stockholm 2021

=== Current roster ===
FURIA Counter-Strike 2 roster
Players
Coaches

Handle	Name	Nationality
FalleN	Toledo, Gabriel	Brazil
yuurih	Santos, Yuri	Brazil
KSCERATO	Cerato, Kaike	Brazil
YEKINDAR	Gaļinskis, Mareks	Latvia
molodoy	Golubenko, Danil	Kazakhstan

Head coach

Sid "sidde" Macedo

Assistant coach(es)

Juan "Hepa" Borges

Aidyn "KrizzeN" Tūrlybekov

Legend:
- (I) Inactive
- (S) Suspended
- Substitute
- (injured) Injury / Illness

Latest roster transaction: 4 July 2025.

== League of Legends ==
=== History ===
Furia entered the League of Legends scene with the acquiring of Uppercut Esports' roster to form Furia Uppercut in the CBLOL. The team shortly announced it would rename itself to Furia Esports after the conclusion of the CBLOL 2020 Split 1 tournament.

=== Achievements ===
International

- America's Cup
  - Winners (1): 2026

Domestic

- CBLOL/ LTA South
  - Winners (2): 2025-2, 2026-1
  - Runner-Up (1): 2026-2

=== Current roster ===
FURIA League of Legends roster
Players
Coaches

Handle	Name	Nationality
Guigo	Ruiz, Guilherme	Brazil
Tatu	Seixas, Pedro	Brazil
Tutsz	Peixoto Machado, Arthur	Brazil
Ayu	Saraiva, Andrey	Brazil
JoJo	Dzelme de Oliveira, Gabriel	Brazil

Head coach

Thomas "Thinkcard" Slotkin

Legend:
- (I) Inactive
- (S) Suspended
- Substitute
- (injured) Injury / Illness

Latest roster transaction: 12 August 2024.

=== Season-by-season ===
Year		CBLOL					First Stand	Mid-Season Invitational	World Championship	Other
Year		Regular season				Playoffs	First Stand	Mid-Season Invitational	World Championship	Other
Year		Matches	Wins	Losses	Position	Playoffs	First Stand	Mid-Season Invitational	World Championship	Other
2020	Split 1 (Note: As FURIA Uppercut.)	21	11	10	3rd place	Semifinals		–	–	
2020	Split 2	21	8	13	7th place			–	–	
2021	Split 1	18	5	13	9th place	–		–	–	
2021	Split 2	18	4	14	10th place	–		–	–	
2022	Split 1	18	12	6	2nd place	Lower round 3		–	–	
2022	Split 2	18	15	3	1st place	Lower semifinals		–	–	
2023	Split 1	18	9	9	6th place	Lower round 3		–	–	
2023	Split 2	18	8	10	7th place	–		–	–	
2024	Split 1	18	4	14	9th place	–		–	–	
2024	Split 2	18	9	9	5th place	Lower round 2		–	–	
2025 (Note: For the 2025 season, CBLOL was replaced by LTA South.)	Split 1	–	–	–	–	South lower round 2		Play-In: Round 1	–	
2025	Split 2	10	6	4	2nd place	Winners		Play-In: Round 1	–	
2025	Split 3	8	5	3	2nd place	South lower round 2		Play-In: Round 1	–	
2026	Cup	7	5	2	3rd place	Lower semifinals		Bracket: Round 1		Winners (Americas Cup)
2026	Split 1	7	5	2	2nd place	Champion		Bracket: Round 1		Winners (Americas Cup)
2026	Split 2							Bracket: Round 1		Winners (Americas Cup)

== Rocket League ==
=== History ===
In the 2022 Rocket League Championship Series, Furia Esports would make it to the semifinals of the tournament before losing to tournament winners Team BDS.

=== Achievements ===
- (gold) Gamers8 2022
- (gold) RLCS 2022–23 – Spring: North America Regional 3 – Spring Invitational
- (silver) RLCS Season X – South American Championship
- 3rd-4th – 2022 Rocket League Championship Series
- South American RLCS MVP
- Represented Brazil at the 2024 FIFAe World Cup

=== Current roster ===
FURIA Rocket League roster
Players
Coaches

Handle	Name	Nationality
swiftt	Lewy Gomes, Pedro Henrique	Brazil
Lostt	Buzon, Gabriel	Brazil
yanxnz	Xisto Nolasco, Yan	Brazil

Head coach

Bruno “brunovisqui” Roschel Grandini

Legend:
- (I) Inactive
- (S) Suspended
- Substitute
- (injured) Injury / Illness

Latest roster transaction: 9 November 2025.

== Rainbow Six Siege ==
=== Achievements ===
- (gold) RE:LO:AD 2025
- (gold) South America League 2025 – Stage 1
- (gold) South America League 2025 – Stage 2
- (bronze) Esports World Cup 2025
- (bronze) Six Invitational 2025
- 3rd-4th — Esports World Cup 2024
- 5th-8th — Blast R6 Major Manchester 2024
- 5th-8th — Six Berlin Major 2022
- 9th-12th — Six Invitational 2022
- 5th-8th — Six Mexico Major 2022
- 9th-12th — Six Invitational 2021

=== 2024 roster ===
FURIA Rainbow Six Siege roster
Players
Coaches

Handle	Name	Nationality
HerdsZ	Herdina, Gustavo	Brazil
Kheyze	Zanello, Diego	Brazil
Jv92	Vitor, João	Brazil
Felipox	De Lucia, Felipe	Brazil
Nade	Sá Ferreira, Felipe	Brazil

Head coach

Igor "Igoorctg" Santos

Assistant coach(es)

Felipe "Abreu" Silva

Legend:
- (I) Inactive
- (S) Suspended
- Substitute
- (injured) Injury / Illness

Latest roster transaction: 11 March 2024.

== Valorant ==
Furia announced its entry into the Valorant scene on 21 January 2021. The team would make an appearance at the inaugural 2021 Valorant Champions but would be eliminated in the group stages. They returned for the 2022 Valorant Champions, but finished the championship in the same place. In late 2022, Riot Games confirmed Furia would receive a partner spot in the international VALORANT league system.

=== 2025 roster ===
FURIA Valorant roster
Players
Coaches

Handle	Name	Nationality
Urango	Rodrigues, Victor	Brazil
Palla	Alcides, Davi	Brazil
basic	Henrique Ferlin Tessaro, Luiz	Brazil
heat	Marcelo, Olavo	Brazil
tuyz	Vieira, Arthur	Brazil
khalil (I)	Schmidt, Khalil	Brazil

Head coach

Ian "Shaw" Jardim

Assistant coach(es)

Lucas "Kamino" Kamino

Legend:
- (I) Inactive
- (S) Suspended
- Substitute
- (injured) Injury / Illness

Latest roster transaction: 15 July 2025.
