= PaiN Gaming =

Brazilian esports team

paiN Gaming
- Short name: PNG, paiN
- Games: Clash Royale; Counter-Strike 2; Dota 2; Kings League; League of Legends; PlayerUnknown's Battlegrounds; Free Fire
- Founded: March 2010; 16 years ago
- Based in: São Paulo, Brazil
- Owner: Arthur Zarzur
- CEO: Thomas Hamence
- Partners: Cassino.bet; Corsair; Dorflex; ExitLag; JBL; Melitta
- Website: www.pain.gg

paiN Gaming is a Brazilian esports organization founded in March 2010 by Arthur Zarzur, a former professional Dota player. It is best known for its League of Legends team, which has participated in the Campeonato Brasileiro de League of Legends (CBLOL), the top flight of the game in Brazil, since 2012.

paiN Gaming is one of the oldest esports organisations in Brazil and has a higher following on social media than many traditional sports clubs. It was also the first esports organization in Latin America to have a gaming house and the first in the world to have a fan membership program.

== History ==
paiN Gaming was founded in March 2010 by Arthur "PAADA" Zarzur, a former professional Dota player. Its inaugural League of Legends roster consisted of players from CNB e-Sports Club and GameWise. The organization has since expanded into the professional scenes of Clash Royale, Counter-Strike, Dota 2, Free Fire and PlayerUnknown's Battlegrounds.

In December 2025, the partnership between paiN Gaming and the Desimpedidos resulted in the formation of a joint team to compete in the Kings League, a seven-a-side football competition.

== Rosters ==
=== League of Legends ===
paiN League of Legends roster
Players
Coaches

Handle	Name	Nationality
Wizer	Choi, Euiseok	South Korea
CarioK	Oliveira, Marcos	Brazil
Roamer	Jo, Woojin	South Korea
TitaN	Lima, Alexandre	Brazil
Kuri	Choi, Wonyoung	South Korea

Head coach

Shin "Xero" Hyuk

Assistant coach(es)

Matheus "Sarkis" Guimarães
Bruno "Bp" Pombal

Legend:
- (I) Inactive
- (S) Suspended
- Substitute
- (injured) Injury / Illness

Latest roster transaction: 21 June 2024.

=== Counter-Strike 2 ===
paiN Counter-Strike 2 roster
Players
Coaches

Handle	Name	Nationality
biguzera	Bittencourt, Rodrigo	Brazil
snow	Vinicius, João	Brazil
piriajr	Barbosa, Guilherme	Brazil
vsm	Moreira, Vinicius	Brazil
saffee	Costa, Rafael	Brazil

Head coach

Henrique "rikz" Waku

Legend:
- (I) Inactive
- (S) Suspended
- Substitute
- (injured) Injury / Illness

Latest roster transaction: 25 Jun 2026.

== Season-by-season ==
=== League of Legends ===
==== Professional team ====
Year		CBLOL					Mid-Season Invitational	World Championship	Other
Year		Regular season				Playoffs	Mid-Season Invitational	World Championship	Other
Year		Matches	Wins	Losses	Position	Playoffs	Mid-Season Invitational	World Championship	Other
2012		–	–	–	–	3rd place			
2013		3	2	1	2nd place	Champion			
2014	Split 1	22	12	10	3rd place	Runner-up		–	
2014	Split 2	–	–	–	–	Semifinals		–	
2015	Split 1	14	9	5	4th place	3rd place	–	Group stage	Champion (IWC Chile)
2015	Split 2	14	9	5	3rd place	Champion	–	Group stage	Champion (IWC Chile)
2016	Split 1	14	8	6	4th place	6th place	–	–	
2016	Split 2	14	9	5	3rd place	Semifinals	–	–	
2017	Split 1	14	10	4	3rd place	Semifinals	–	–	Semifinals (Superliga ABCDE)
2017	Split 2	14	8	6	4th place	Runner-up	–	–	Semifinals (Superliga ABCDE)
2018	Split 1	19	7	12	8th place	–	–	–	Runner-up (Superliga ABCDE)
2018	Split 2 (Note: Refers to the Brazilian Challenger Circuit (Circuito Desafiante).)	10	7	3	1st place	Runner-up	–	–	Runner-up (Superliga ABCDE)
2019	Split 1	15	13	2	2nd place	Champion	–	–	Champion (Superliga ABCDE)
2019	Split 2	21	10	11	5th place	–	–	–	Champion (Superliga ABCDE)
2020	Split 1	21	10	11	6th place	–	–	–	
2020	Split 2	21	14	7	1st place	Runner-up	–	–	
2021	Split 1	18	11	7	5th place	Champion	Group stage	–	
2021	Split 2	18	14	4	1st place	Semifinals	Group stage	–	
2022	Split 1	18	10	8	4th place	Runner-up	–	–	
2022	Split 2	18	12	6	3rd place	Runner-up	–	–	
2023	Split 1	18	12	6	1st place	Runner-up	–	–	
2023	Split 2	18	14	4	1st place	Runner-up	–	–	
2024	Split 1	18	11	7	4th place	Runner-up	–	Swiss stage	
2024	Split 2	18	14	4	2nd place	Champion	–	Swiss stage	
2025 (Note: For the 2025 season, CBLOL was replaced by LTA South.)	Split 1	–	–	–	–	Quarterfinals	–	–	
2025	Split 2	10	9	1	1st place	Runner-up	–	–	
2025	Split 3	3	2	1	4th place	Champ. Round 1	–	–	
2026	Cup	7	2	5	6th place	Play-In Lower Final			
2026	Split 1	7	1	6	7th place	–			
2026	Split 2								

==== Academy team ====
Year		CBLOL Academy / Circuito Desafiante					Other
Year		Regular season				Playoffs	Other
Year		Matches	Wins	Losses	Position	Playoffs	Other
2021	Split 1	18	7	11	7th place	–	
2021	Split 2	18	8	10	6th place	Runner-up	
2022	Split 1	18	12	6	3rd place	Runner-up	
2022	Split 2	18	16	2	1st place	Champion	
2023	Split 1	18	7	11	9th place	–	
2023	Split 2	18	10	8	6th place	Lower Final	
2024	Split 1	11	9	2	1st place	Champion	Champion (Americas Challengers)
2024	Split 2	13	11	2	1st place	Runner-up	Champion (Americas Challengers)
2025	Split 1	Did not participate					
2025	Split 2	Did not participate					
2026	Split 1	9	2	7	7th place	Lower Final	
2026	Split 2						
