= Campeonato Brasileiro de League of Legends =

Brazilian esports league

- Current season, competition or edition: 2026 CBLOL season
- Formerly: League of Legends Championship of The Americas South (2025 only)
- Game: League of Legends
- Founded: 13 August 2012; 14 years ago
- First season: 2012
- Owner: Riot Games
- Director: Igor Corrêa
- No. of teams: 8
- Region: South America
- Venues: Riot Games Arena, São Paulo
- Most recent champion: Los Grandes (1st title) (Split 2 2026)
- Most titles: LOUD, INTZ (5 titles each)
- Qualification: Franchise partnership
- Relegation to: Guest teams only: Liga Regional Sur (Southern LATAM); Circuito Desafiante (Brazil)
- International cups: First Stand Tournament; Mid-Season Invitational; World Championship
- Related competitions: LCK, LCP, LCS, LEC, LPL
- Website: www.lolesports.com

The Campeonato Brasileiro de League of Legends (CBLOL, lit. League of Legends Brazilian Championship) is the top level of professional League of Legends competition in Brazil and Southern Latin America. There were anywhere from eight to ten teams in the league prior to 2025. Each annual season of play is divided into three splits, marked Split 1, Split 2, and Split 3; during the two-split era both splits consisting of eighteen rounds of round-robin tournament play, which then concluded with play-off tournaments between the top six teams. The winners of each split qualify for First Stand, the Mid-Season Invitational and World Championship respectively.

CBLOL would merge with North America's LCS and Latin America's Liga Latinoamérica to form the League of Legends Championship of The Americas in 2025, with CBLOL becoming the South Conference ("LTA South"). The decision was reversed beginning in 2026, reinstating CBLOL.

With the exception of some touring events, all games of the CBLOL are played live at the Riot Games Arena in São Paulo. In addition to a small studio audience, all games are streamed live on Twitch and YouTube. Live games are also broadcast on Xsports; they were broadcast on SporTV in 2017.

== Overview ==
The tournament had been organized since 2012, shortly after the debut of the Brazilian server, with professionalism still incipient, when it was held in just three days. In 2014, the first league championship was held: the Brazilian League - Champions Series, and in the same year the precedent of two annual competitions was inaugurated, with the holding of the Brazilian Regional Final. After that, the two-split format was adopted, with each one played in the first phase in the "all against all" format, and later knockout until the grand finale. Also in 2015, the league format with stable members was adopted, but subject to lowering and promotion of the worst placed to benefit the best of the Challenging Circuit. Until 2014, a qualifying phase for the championship dispute was adopted.

On 21 January 2020, Riot Brazil confirmed that CBLOL moved to franchising.

On 11 June 2024, Riot announced that CBLOL, LCS and LLA would form a pan-American league, the League of Legends Championship of The Americas in 2025. Six of the ten CBLOL teams remained partnered and formed the South Conference ("LTA South"), with INTZ, KaBuM! Esports, Liberty and Los Grandes leaving after 2024; KaBuM! would join a revived Challenging Circuit, which would serve as Brazil's second division once more. They would be joined by a team from southern Latin America (which would be Leviatán) and a guest slot determined by a promotion and relegation tournament with teams from the Challenging Circuit and South Regional League (Southern LATAM) after 2025; this guest spot went to Isurus Gaming, initially as Isurus Estral under a partnership with Estral Esports.

CBLOL adopted a first split which qualified a team from the pan-American league for a new international tournament named First Stand, but this was won by North America's Team Liquid. Also, the third split would lead to the Americas regional tournament which would send at least one team from the South to Worlds, which would be Vivo Keyd Stars. On September 28, 2025, Riot would discontinue the LTA and revive CBLOL and the LCS.

== Format ==
=== Copa CBLOL ===
- 8 teams participate
- 3 weeks, League play
- Single Round Robin
- Matches are best of one
- Advancement:
  - The Top four teams advance to the Playoffs
  - 5th - 8th advance to Entry Phase
    - 5th and 6th compete for the 5th Playoffs spot
    - Loser of 5th/6th competes with winner of 7th/8th match for the final Playoffs spot
    - Matches in Entry Phase are best of three

=== Splits 1 and 2 ===
- 8 teams participate
- 7 weeks, League play
- Single Round Robin
- Matches are best of three with Fearless Draft
- Advancement:
  - The Top six teams advance to the Playoffs
  - 7th and 8th don't advance to Playoffs

== Current teams ==
Team	First appearance
Fluxo	2023 Split 1
FURIA	2020 Split 1
Leviatán	2025 Split 1 (LTA South)
Los Grandes (Note: Guest Spot, was initially belonging to Isurus before they withdrew.)	2022 Split 2
LOUD	2021 Split 1
paiN Gaming	2012
RED Canids Kalunga	2016 Split 1
Vivo Keyd Stars	2013

== Results ==
Year	Split	Winner	Runner-up	Third place	Fourth place
2012		vTi Ignis	vTi Nox	paiN Gaming	Insight
2013		paiN Gaming	CNB	RMA	Nex Impetus
2014	1	Keyd Stars	paiN Gaming	CNB	KaBuM! Esports
2014	2	KaBuM! Esports	CNB	Keyd Stars	paiN Gaming
2015	1	INTZ	Keyd Stars	paiN Gaming	KaBuM! Black
2015	2	paiN Gaming	INTZ	Keyd Stars	g3nerationX
2016	1	INTZ	Keyd Stars	Operation Kino	KaBuM! Esports
2016	2	INTZ	CNB	paiN Gaming	Keyd Stars
2017	1	RED Canids	Keyd Stars	paiN Gaming	INTZ
2017	2	Team oNe	paiN Gaming	RED Canids	INTZ
2018	1	KaBuM! Esports	Vivo Keyd	RED Canids	CNB
2018	2	KaBuM! Esports	Flamengo Esports	CNB	Vivo Keyd
2019	1	INTZ	Flamengo Esports	Redemption POA	CNB
2019	2	Flamengo Esports	INTZ	KaBuM! Esports	Uppercut
2020	1	KaBuM! Esports	Flamengo Esports	Vivo Keyd	FURIA Uppercut
2020	2	INTZ	paiN Gaming	KaBuM! Esports	Prodigy
2021	1	paiN Gaming	Vorax	Flamengo Esports	RED Canids Kalunga
2021	2	RED Canids Kalunga	Rensga	paiN Gaming	Vorax
2022	1	RED Canids Kalunga	paiN Gaming	KaBuM! Esports	FURIA
2022	2	LOUD	paiN Gaming	FURIA	RED Canids Kalunga
2023	1	LOUD	paiN Gaming	Los Grandes	FURIA
2023	2	LOUD	paiN Gaming	RED Canids Kalunga	INTZ
2024	1	LOUD	paiN Gaming	Vivo Keyd Stars	RED Canids Kalunga
2024	2	paiN Gaming	Vivo Keyd Stars	RED Canids Kalunga	LOUD
2025	No season — replaced by LTA South				
2026	Cup	LOUD	RED Canids Kalunga	FURIA	Los Grandes
2026	1	FURIA	Los Grandes	RED Canids Kalunga	Fluxo w7m
2026	2	Los Grandes	FURIA	LOUD	RED Canids Kalunga

=== Titles by team ===
Team	Winners	Runner-up	Splits won	Splits runner-up
INTZ	5	2	2015-1, 2016-1, 2016-2, 2019-1, 2020-2	2015-2, 2019-2
LOUD	4	0	2022-2, 2023-1, 2023-2, 2024-1	—
paiN Gaming	4	8	2013, 2015-2, 2021-1, 2024-2	2014-1, 2017-2, 2020-2, 2022-1, 2022-2, 2023-1, 2023-2, 2024-1
KaBuM! Esports	4	0	2014-2, 2018-1, 2018-2, 2020-1	—
RED Canids Kalunga	3	0	2017-1, 2021-2, 2022-1	—
Los Grandes*	2	1	2017-2, 2026-2	2026-1
Vivo Keyd Stars	1	5	2014-1	2015-1, 2016-1, 2017-1, 2018-1, 2024-2
Flamengo Esports	1	3	2019-2	2018-2, 2019-1, 2020-1
Furia	1	1	2026-1	2026-2
vTi Ignis	1	0	2012	—

* Los Grandes wins the 2017-2 title as Team One.

CBLOL Cup

Team	Winners	Runner-up	Splits won	Splits runner-up
LOUD	1	0	2026	—
RED Canids Kalunga	0	1	—	2026
