= KaBuM! =

Brazilian e-commerce company

- Type: Closed-end S.A.
- Industry: E-commerce
- Founded: May 2003; 23 years ago in Limeira, São Paulo, Brazil
- Founders: Leandro Ramos; Thiago Ramos
- Headquarters: Brazil
- Area served: Brazil
- Products: Electronics (primarily)
- Number of employees: 270
- Parent: Magazine Luiza
- Website: www.kabum.com.br

KaBuM! is a Brazilian e-commerce company specializing in electronics and information technology. It was founded in May 2003 in the city of Limeira, São Paulo, by brothers Leandro Ramos and Thiago Ramos. The company is one of the largest of its kind in Brazil, and sells a wide variety of products in addition to electronics, including automotive electronics, cosmetics, perfume, and musical instruments.

== History ==
The KaBuM! was founded by brothers Leandro and Thiago Ramos, in May 2003, in São Paulo, operating 100% online since its creation. The founders themselves were responsible for developing the e-commerce platform, specializing in the sale of hardware products, gamer line, peripherals, smart home, smartphones and electronics. Deliveries to customers were made via the Post Office, being extended to other services, according to the region of destination of the orders, such as UPS and TNT.

With consumer orders distributed across the country, the KaBuM! are located in the interior of the states of São Paulo and Espírito Santo, the latter being the largest in terms of available area, with approximately 12 thousand m^{2}. The total number of active employees in the company is more than 1000 people.

In 2013, the e-commerce opened its office in the United States, in the state of Florida, with the objective of monitoring the launches of technology manufacturers and negotiating the availability of products on Brazilian soil, in a faster time.

Another KaBuM investment! was applied in the services available for delivery, in 2015, like a Boeing 727-200 Full Cargo, dedicated to e-commerce, with the capacity to transport 25 tons per flight to the main capitals of the country.

As for payment modalities, e-commerce of technology allows customers, purchases via Pix, bank slip and credit card, through the MasterCard, Visa, American Express, Hipercard, Elo and Diner Club International; via debit, by Banco Itaú and Banco do Brasil; in addition to the PayPal Electronic Wallet. Among the more traditional campaigns promoted by KaBuM!, Mega Maio and Black Friday stand out.

== Structure ==
KaBuM! is a closed-end S.A. and has multiple subsidiaries specialising in different sectors, such as KaBuM! Togo, an online supermarket, and KaBuM! TV, a reality show about technology. The company does not have any physical stores, but it does have three distribution centres located in São Paulo.
