= League of Legends Championship of The Americas =

Former professional League of Legends esports league

- Most recent season or competition: 2025 LTA season
- Game: League of Legends
- Founded: October 31, 2024; 19 months ago
- Founder: Riot Games
- First season: 2025
- Folded: 2025
- Replaced by: League Championship Series (North); Campeonato Brasileiro de League of Legends (South)
- Owner: Riot Games
- Commissioner: Mark Zimmerman
- No. of teams: 16 (13 franchised, 2 guests, 1 provisional guest (Note: 100 Thieves was a "provisional guest team", as their franchise slot was sold back to Riot Games. For 2025, they participated like a franchised team in the LTA, meaning they can't be relegated. 100 Thieves would leave League of Legends after the 2025 season.))
- Headquarters: North: Los Angeles; South: São Paulo
- Continent: Americas
- Last champion: FlyQuest (2025)
- Most titles: FlyQuest (1 title)
- Relegation to: (Guest teams only): Circuito Desafiante (Brazil); Liga Regional Norte (Northern LATAM); Liga Regional Sur (Southern LATAM); North American Challengers League (NA)
- International cups: First Stand; Mid Season Invitational; World Championship
- Related competitions: LEC, LCK, LPL, LCP

The League of Legends Championship of The Americas, also known as the League of The Americas (LTA), was the top level of professional League of Legends in the Americas, which included the United States, Canada, Latin America and the Caribbean. The esports league was run by Riot Games and had sixteen teams split into two conferences, North and South. Its only season was divided into three splits, with playoff competition between the top teams. At the end of each split, the best teams qualified for the three international tournaments – the winner of the first split qualified for the First Stand Tournament, the winners of each conference in the second split qualified for the Mid Season Invitational, and the top three teams in the third split playoffs (known as the LTA Championship) qualified for the annual League of Legends World Championship.

The league was initially announced in June 2024 as a merger between the then three regional leagues in the Americas – The League Championship Series (LCS), Campeonato Brasileiro de League of Legends (CBLOL) and Liga Latinoamérica (LLA). The LCS would form the basis for the North Conference (LTA North), while CBLOL formed the basis for the South Conference (LTA South). These two leagues would have six partnered teams each join the LTA for its inaugural season, with the LLA providing two additional teams, one each for the North and South Conference. In addition, one extra team from the LLA (in the South Conference) and one team from North America's second-tier league, the North American Challengers League (in the North Conference), would be "guest teams" that had to requalify for the LTA at the end of the season in promotion and relegation playoffs with the best teams from the regional second-tier leagues.

The league would only last one season, with the LCS and CBLOL returning in 2026 as separate leagues. FlyQuest won the only LTA Championship.

With the exception of some touring events, all LTA games were played live in two venues, both known as the Riot Games Arena – one in Los Angeles, California, United States, for the North Conference and one in São Paulo, Brazil for the South Conference. In addition to a small studio audience, all games were streamed live on Twitch and YouTube.

== History ==
=== Pre-LTA ===
==== North America ====
Prior to the formation of the then-North American League of Legends Championship Series (NA LCS), League of Legends had a growing competitive scene, but a professional league was not a central component of Riot Games' initial business strategy. However, in 2011, professional organized league play became a prominent point of emphasis for Riot after the company hosted its inaugural championship tournament at DreamHack in Sweden.

On August 6, 2012, Riot Games announced the formation of the League of Legends Championship Series (LCS), a professional gaming league initially designed to provide support to teams from Europe, Asia, and the United States. The inaugural season of the LCS commenced on February 7, 2013, coinciding with the third season of professional play in League of Legends; as such, it was designated as "Season 3". The LCS was split into two regional leagues: the European League of Legends Championship Series (EU LCS, now the LEC) and the North American League of Legends Championship Series. Initially, eight teams competed in each league, with the best teams qualifying for the League of Legends World Championship; this was later expanded to ten teams via expansion tournaments prior to the 2015 season. At the end of 2013, Riot announced the League of Legends Challenger Series (CS), which allowed teams to be able to participate in the LCS via a promotion and relegation system.

In June 2017, Riot Games announced that the NA LCS would shift to a franchised league with ten permanent teams beginning in 2018. Each team paid $10 million (for existing League of Legends teams who were in the NA LCS or CS) or $13 million (for new teams). The NA LCS re-branded its name to simply the LCS in December 2018 (after the EU LCS became the LEC), and then to just the League Championship Series before the 2021 season.

==== Brazil ====
Professional League competition began in 2012 in the form of a three-day competition known as the Campeonato Brasileiro de League of Legends (lit. Brazilian Championship of League of Legends), with the winner qualifying for the World Championship's International Wild Card Tournament (and later the standard Worlds play-in stage) after the 2013 season. In 2014, the league expanded to two splits, with the second split being a regional final. In 2015, CBLOL adopted a standard two-split format and a second-tier tournament known as the Circuito Desafiante (lit. Challenger's Circuit) that promotes teams to CBLOL. In 2020, Riot Games Brasil announced that the league would expand to ten teams from its original eight and adopt a franchise format like the LCS in North America for 2021.

==== Latin America ====
Latin American League of Legends competition began in 2015, however it was divided into two distinct zones at first. Northern Latin America (comprising Mexico, Central America, the Caribbean, Colombia, Ecuador and Venezuela had the Copa Latinoamérica Norte (CLN, later renamed Liga Latinoamérica Norte) and Southern Latin America (comprising Peru, Bolivia, Chile, Argentina, Paraguay and Uruguay) had the Copa Latinoamérica Sur (CLS). Both separate leagues would each send teams to international competition beginning in 2016.

In May 2018, Riot announced plans to merge both the LLN and CLS into a single league, known as the Liga Latinoamérica (LLA), starting in 2019. Unlike the LCS and later CBLOL, the LLA would continue to utilize a promotion and relegation format. All eight teams were awarded "performance points" after each split, with the worst two teams after the Closing split on points having to requalify for the LLA against the best teams in the tier-two Liga Regional Norte and Liga Regional Sur.

=== The League ===
On June 11, 2024, Riot Games announced in a blog post titled "LoL Esports: Building Towards A Brighter Future" that the LCS, CBLOL and LLA would plan to merge into a Pan-American league that would begin play in 2025.

Under this new model, six teams each from the LCS and CBLOL would become partners in the league and form their own separate conferences – North and South – along with one LLA team and one "guest team" (which would be determined by a promotion and relegation tournament after each season) each. Under the new three-split model, the best teams from each conference would compete against each other to determine a champion for the wider Americas region.

The league was officially formed on October 31, 2024, as the League of Legends Championship of The Americas, with the inaugural 16 teams in the league announced that same day. 100 Thieves, initially planned to be a regular partnered team, also announced on October 31 that they sold their slot back to Riot Games. As such, they would be a "provisional guest team", which means they'll not be eligible for relegation. 100 Thieves would leave competitive League at the end of the 2025 season, as Riot found a new partner to take their place.

On September 28, 2025, during the LTA Championship grand final between the LTA North's FlyQuest and the LTA South's Vivo Keyd Stars, Riot announced the discontinuation of the LTA, with the LCS and CBLOL returning as separate leagues. FlyQuest would end up winning the only LTA Championship.

In 2026, following the split of the LTA, Riot Games announced the Americas Cup, an international tournament resembling interconference play in the LTA, featuring the second and third-place teams from the LCS and CBLOL winter splits.

== Format ==
The lone LTA season iwas divided into three splits. Each split qualified teams to the three international competitions within League of Legends – the First Stand Tournament, the Mid Season Invitational and the League of Legends World Championship.

The first split saw each conference hold an eight-team double-elimination bracket with best-of-three series. The top 4 teams per conference (the winners of the two upper bracket semi-finals and the two lower bracket semi-finals respectively) advanced to an eight-team single-elimination bracket, like the one at the World Championship. The winner of the split qualifies for First Stand. All series during this split utilized Fearless Draft, where picked Champions cannot be played again for the remainder of the series. For the 2025 season, the knockout stage was held in São Paulo. São Paulo was meant to rotate hosting the knockout stage with Los Angeles, with São Paulo hosting in odd-numbered years and Los Angeles hosting in even-numbered years.

The second split initially would have the eight teams in each conference compete against their conference opponents in a double round-robin group stage, with all games being best-of-one. The top 6 teams per conference compete in a double-elimination best-of-five bracket, with the winner of each conference qualifying for the Mid-Season Invitational. However, as Fearless Draft was adopted on a permanent basis after First Stand, a different format was used. This would feature a single round-robin best-of-one group stage which would seed two single round-robin best-of-three groups, followed by seeding matches and then the double-elimination playoffs. No overall Split 2 champion was crowned. Had the LTA won the First Stand Tournament, the LTA's two representatives from each conference would both get byes to the Bracket Stage, skipping the Play-in Stage entirely. As this was not the case, only the winner from the conference which was represented at First Stand (that being the North after Team Liquid won the first split) earned a bye to the Bracket Stage.

The third split utilized a unique format called "Pick & Play" for its first stage. The first week saw each team face each other based on the second split results, but after that the lowest-ranked teams picked their opponents. After the third week, a double elimination bracket was formed, with the top 4 teams seeded into the winner's bracket and the bottom 4 seeded into the loser's bracket. This bracket saw the best ranked teams pick their opponents for the first two rounds. The remaining team in the winner's bracket would play in the "Worlds Qualifying Series" for the upper-bracket spot in the Americas Regional Championship against the lower bracket winner, with the third place team earning the final spot for their conference. All games in "Pick & Play" were best-of-threes, with the exception of the bracket stage, which consisted of best-of-fives.

The Americas Regional Championship, as the third split playoffs were known, saw the three remaining teams from each of the two conferences compete in a double elimination bracket consisting entirely of best-of-fives. The winners of the "Worlds Qualifying Series" matches for each conference started in the upper bracket, while the remaining teams started in the lower bracket; as the two teams in the upper bracket could finish no worse than third place, they qualified automatically for the World Championship. The winner of the grand final officially became the LTA champion, with the top three teams (top four if the LTA earned an additional spot via MSI) qualifying for the World Championship. The 2025 Championship's final rounds were held at the Credit Union of Texas Event Center in Allen, Texas, in the Dallas–Fort Worth metroplex in the United States. For odd-numbered years, the Regional Championship was to be by the LTA North, with the first rounds held in Los Angeles and the final two rounds held as a roadshow, while the South was meant to host in even-numbered years with São Paulo hosting the opening rounds.

=== Promotion Tournament ===
The two guest teams (one per conference), regardless of their performance during the LTA season, had to requalify for the LCS and CBLOL in 2026 end of the year against the top two second split teams from the second-tier leagues from each conference. (Note: Each second-tier league may have had academy teams linked to LTA partners. If an academy team finished in the top two, as Vivo Keyd Stars Academy did in the Circuito Desafiante, their spot was given to the next-best non-academy team in that league.) For the North, their guest team competed against the best teams in the North American Challengers League and Liga Regional Norte, while the South Conference's guest team competed against the best from Brazil's Circuito Desafiante and Liga Regional Sur. The second-tier league winners and defending guest team qualify for a double-elimination, best-of-five bracket; the runners-up of each tier two conference compete in a play-in match to face their conference's LTA guest team in the first round. The winners of the grand final in each conference's promotion tournament qualified for their respective league as the guest teams for next season.

== Teams ==
Final rosters from Split 3. Italics denotes a guest team, which had to promote back into their respective league at the end of each season.

Teams	Roster					Coach
Teams	Top	Jungle	Mid	Bot	Support	Coach
LTA North (LCS)
100 Thieves	Dhokla; Sniper	River	Quid	FBI	Eyla	Goldenglue
Cloud9 (Note: Known as Cloud9 Kia for sponsorship reasons.)	Thanatos	Blaber	Loki	Zven	Vulcan	Reapered
Dignitas	Photon	Sheiden	Keine	Tomo	Isles	Rigby
Disguised	Castle	eXyu	DARKWINGS	Rahel	Huhi	Ido
FlyQuest	Bwipo; GaKGoS	Inspired	Quad	Massu	Busio	Nukeduck
LYON (Note: Formed as a merger between Rainbow7 and Six Karma. The team was initially known as Lyon Gaming (as a homage to Rainbow7's former name), before renaming to LYON due to trademark issues.)	Srtty; Yayo; Zamudo	Oddie	Saint	Hena	Lyonz	Khynm
Shopify Rebellion	Fudge	Contractz	Palafox	Bvoy	Ceos	Reven
Team Liquid	Impact	Yuuji	APA	Yeon	CoreJJ	Spawn
LTA South (CBLOL)
Fluxo w7m (Note: Formed as a partnership between Fluxo and w7m esports.)	curty	Yampi	Fuuu	Marvin	ProDelta	Aoshi
FURIA	Guigo	Tatu	Tutsz	Ayu	JoJo	Thinkcard
Isurus (Note: When Isurus were initially announced as LTA guest members, they did so as Isurus Estral, a partnership between them and Estral Esports. However, after Split 2 of the 2025 LTA season, the two organizations opted to part ways, with Isurus keeping the LTA South guest slot.)	Zamudo; ZOEN	Josedeodo	Leza	Snaker	Ackerman	Ukkyr
Keyd Stars (Note: Known as Vivo Keyd Stars for sponsorship reasons.)	Boal	Disamis	Mireu	Morttheus	Trymbi scamber	SeeEl
Leviatán	Zothve	SCARY	Hauz	ceo	TopLop	Guchi
LOUD	Robo	Gryffinn	Jool	Route	RedBert	Sephis
PaiN Gaming	Wizer	CarioK	Roamer	TitaN	Kuri	Xero
RED Canids (Note: Known as RED Canids Kalunga for sponsorship reasons.)	fNb	doom	Kaze	Rabelo	Frosty	Tockers

== Season ==
Year	Season		Champion	No.				
Year	Season		Champion	No.	LTA #1 seed	LTA #2 seed	LTA #3 seed	LTA #4 seed
2025	Split 1		Team Liquid	16	2025 First Stand Tournament			
2025	Split 1		Team Liquid	16	Team Liquid	—N/a	—N/a	—N/a
2025	Split 2	North	FlyQuest	8	2025 Mid-Season Invitational			
2025	Split 2	South	FURIA	8	FlyQuest	FURIA	—N/a	—N/a
2025	Champion		FlyQuest	16	2025 League of Legends World Championship			
2025	Champion		FlyQuest	16	FlyQuest	Keyd Stars	100 Thieves	—N/a

== Media coverage ==
The LTA primarily connected with its audience through online streaming via dedicated channels on platforms such as Twitch and YouTube. Games were primarily broadcast in English, Spanish and Brazilian Portuguese for each respective audience (North America, Hispanic Latin America and Brazil).

== Concerns and controversies ==
The concerns and controversies surrounding the LTA led to the disbandment of the league and the return of the League Championship Series (LCS) and the Campeonato Brasileiro de League of Legends (CBLOL), which was announced on 28 September 2025.

=== Formats ===
Following the announcement of the league's format, several fans have voiced a "lack of competitive matches" for the league, referring to the Split 1 single-elimination cross-conference bracket having one best-of-five match which is the final with both the quarter-finals and semi-finals being contested in best-of-threes. Moreover, another point of criticism is the lack of a double-elimination format, which the former League Championship Series (LCS) utilized in their final season.

The LTA had the only format during the 2025 season without a lower bracket, as compared to other major Tier 1 regions. For comparison, it was the only league only to have one best-of-five for the first split as other regions namely the LCK (South Korea), LPL (China) LEC (EMEA), and the LCP (Asia-Pacific), implement the double-elimination format and have more number of best-of-five matches.

Fans have also voiced out the lack of consistency in tournament formats, with each split operating a different format for all three splits. As a result, both the LCS and CBLOL, as well as the League of Legends EMEA Championship have announced that the formats for their second and third splits in 2026 will remain the same with the exception of the playoffs.

=== Competitive gap ===
During the cross-conference quarterfinals matchups for Split 1, all LTA North teams won their best-of-three series against the LTA South teams in an 8-1 game record, with Isurus Estral being the only Southern team to take a game in their series against Team Liquid. Due to this, several fans have criticized the competitive gap between teams from the North and the South.

In one of his Twitch live streams, former Los Ratones head coach and former caster Marc "Caedrel" Lamont criticized not only the Split 1 format but also the gap between the quality of teams from the LTA North and LTA South, citing a potential risk of fans from the latter losing interest in competitive League of Legends should the gap continue to widen.
