= Liga Latinoamérica =

Esports league in Latin America

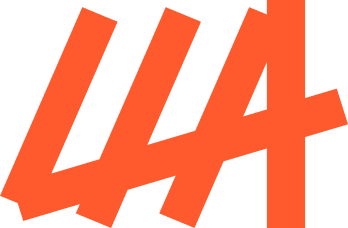
- Formerly: Liga Latinoamérica Norte; Copa Latinoamérica Sur
- Game: League of Legends
- Founded: October 2018
- First season: 2019
- Folded: 2024
- Replaced by: League of Legends Championship of The Americas
- Owner: Riot Games
- No. of teams: 6
- Last champion: Movistar R7 (4th title)
- Most titles: Movistar R7 (4 titles)
- Qualification: Promotion tournament
- Broadcasters: Twitch, YouTube
- Relegation to: Ligas Regionales: Liga Regional Norte; Liga Regional Sur
- Related competitions: Campeonato Brasileiro de League of Legends
- Website: la.lolesports.com

The Liga Latinoamérica (LLA; lit. 'Latin America League') was the top level of professional League of Legends in Latin America (refers to Hispanic America). The esports league was run by Riot Games Latin America. Each annual competitive season was divided into opening and closing seasons, which concluded with a playoff tournament between the top four teams.

Plans for the league were first announced in May 2018 by Riot Games, which stated that it would merge Latin America's two regional leagues, the Liga Latinoamérica Norte (LLN, North Latin America League) and Copa Latinoamérica Sur (CLS, South Latin America Cup), into a single competition.

The LLA ceased operations after the 2024 season, as three teams from the league joined a merged pan-American league known as the League of Legends Championship of The Americas, with a team from Northern Latin America joining the North Conference (made up of teams formerly from the LCS) and two teams from southern Latin America joining the South Conference (made up of teams formerly from CBLOL). In 2026, the LTA was split back into the LCS and CBLOL, but the LLA wasn't reinstated and teams will instead continue to compete within the ecosystems of both leagues (LCS for Northern Latin America, and CBLOL for Southern Latin America).

== Format ==
Each opening and closing season consisted of a group stage and a playoff stage. In the group stage, teams competed for points in a double round robin spread over two phases. The top four teams from the group stage would advance to the playoff stage, which used a "King of the Hill" single elimination bracket. During the 2019 season, there were no phases in the group stage, and six teams participated in a standard single elimination bracket in the playoff stage.

At the end of each split, the teams in the LLA were given performance points, with the bottom two teams in performance points after the Closing split playing in promotion and relegation series against the winners of the two regional leagues in Latin America, the Liga Regional Norte for teams in Mexico, Central America, the Caribbean, Colombia and Ecuador, and the Liga Regional Sur for teams from Argentina, Peru, Bolivia, Paraguay and Uruguay, for a chance to play in the next season's LLA. The 2023 and 2024 promotion tournaments were cancelled with no performance points awarded for the Closing split, following the expelling from one of the teams due to mismanagement and the league's merger respectively.

=== Group stage ===
- Six teams participated
- Double round robin, matches were best-of-three
- Match victories awarded teams one point
- Top six teams advanced to Playoffs

=== Playoffs ===
Double elimination bracket

- Matches were best-of-five
- Top 4 teams play in the winners' bracket
- 5th plays against 6th in the losers' bracket
- The loser with the lower seed from winners' bracket plays in losers' bracket round 2
- The loser with the higher seed from winners' bracket plays in losers' bracket round 3
- For Closing 2024, there were only 4 teams in double elimination playoffs

== Past seasons ==
Year	Season	1st place, gold medalist(s)	2nd place, silver medalist(s)	3rd place, bronze medalist(s)
2019	Opening	Isurus	Rainbow7	All Knights
2019	Closing	Isurus	All Knights	Infinity Esports
2020	Opening	All Knights	Isurus	Rainbow7
2020	Closing	Rainbow7	All Knights	Isurus
2021	Opening	Infinity Esports	Furious Gaming	All Knights
2021	Closing	Infinity Esports	Estral Esports	Furious Gaming
2022	Opening	Team Aze	Estral Esports	Rainbow7
2022	Closing	Isurus	Estral Esports	Team Aze
2023	Opening	Movistar R7	Six Karma	Estral Esports
2023	Closing	Movistar R7	Estral Esports	Six Karma
2024	Opening	Estral Esports	Movistar R7	Isurus
2024	Closing	Movistar R7	INFINITY	Isurus
