= 2025 League of Legends World Championship final =

Esports series

2025 League of Legends World Championship Final
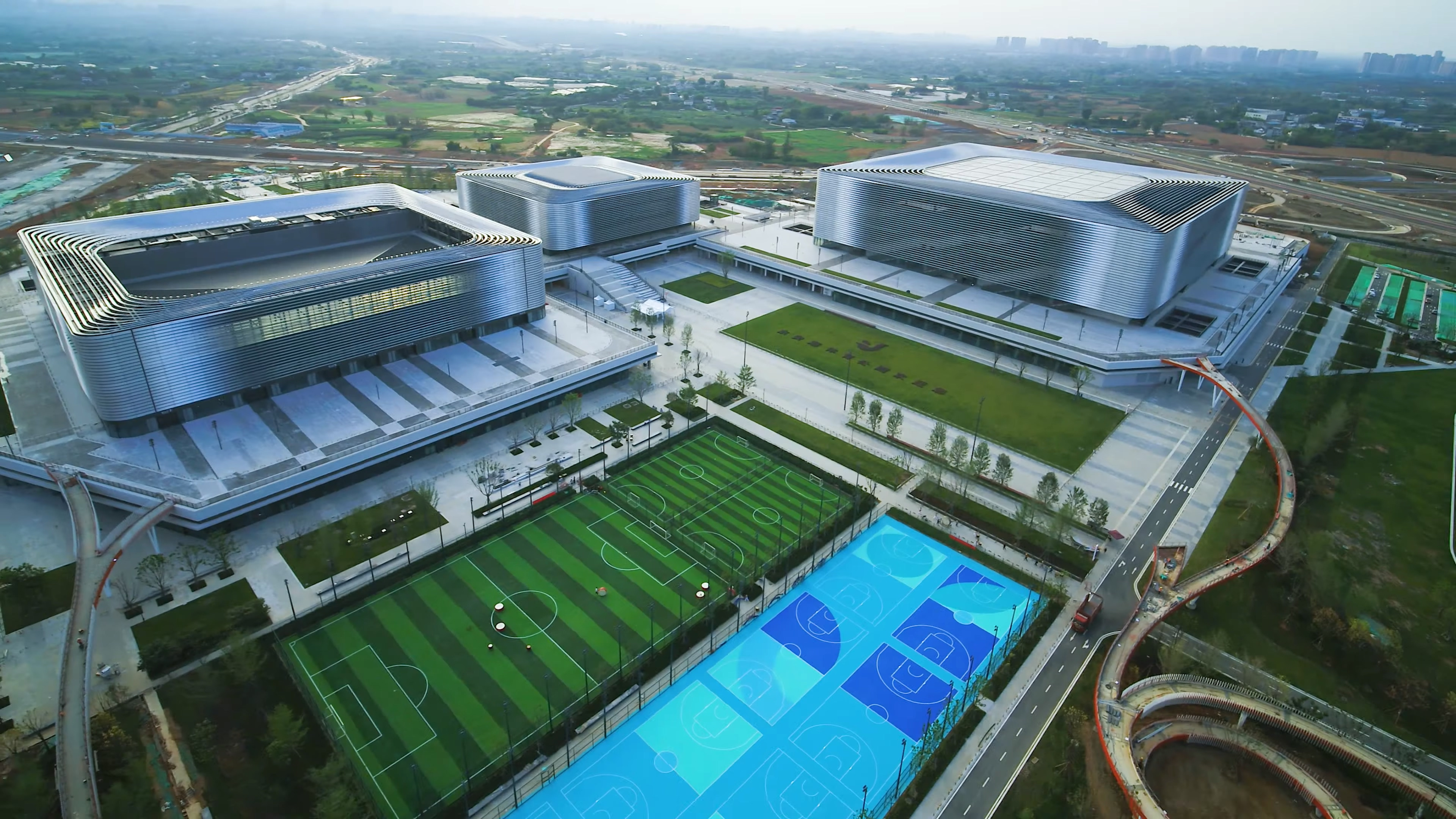
- The Dong'an Lake Sports Park Multifunctional Gymnasium (pictured on the right) hosted the final series.
KT	T1
2	3
- Date: 9 November 2025
- Venue: Dong'an Lake Sports Park Multifunctional Gymnasium, Chengdu, China
- MVP: Lee "Gumayusi" Min-hyeong

Live Broadcast
- Announcers: English; Daniel Drakos; Maurits "Chronicler" Jan Meeusen; Sam "Kobe" Hartman-Kenzler; Chinese; Wang "Remember" Chi-te; Feng "Rita" Yu; Jian "Uzi" Zihao; Luo Yunxi; Korean; Chun "Caster Jun" Yong-jun; Lee "CloudTemplar" Hyun-woo; Go "Ggoggo" Su-jin

The 2025 League of Legends World Championship Final was a League of Legends (LoL) esports series on 9 November 2025 at the Dong'an Lake Sports Park Multifunctional Gymnasium in Chengdu, China between KT Rolster and T1. It marked the fifteenth final of a LoL World Championship and the first championship series to take place under the new three-split structure and competitive calendar for the game's esports ecosystem implemented by the game's developer Riot Games since 2025. Both T1 and KT were two of four representatives from the League of Legends Champions Korea (LCK) at the tournament, the others being Gen.G and Hanwha Life Esports. It was T1's fourth consecutive finals appearance since the 2022 final, while it was KT's World Championship finals debut.

The series was a best of five and was the first World Championship final to feature the Fearless Draft format, after it was implemented by Riot Games for the rest of the 2025 competitive calendar as a result of "overwhelming" positive feedback during the first split and the 2025 First Stand Tournament, and the first China-hosted World Championship final in an indoor arena as the previous two editions of the event held in the country were held in stadiums – 2017 at the Beijing National Stadium, and 2020 at the Pudong Football Stadium.

T1 won the series, 3–2, mounting a comeback of two consecutive victories after facing a 1–2 series deficit after three games - winning their sixth World Championship and becoming the first team in tournament history to win three consecutive world titles. It was also the LCK's fourth consecutive World Championship victory and sixth straight international title dating back to the 2023 World Championship. Lee "Gumayusi" Min-hyeong earned Most Valuable Player honors, becoming the first attack damage carry (ADC) player to win the award since Park "Ruler" Jae-hyuk, when the latter won the honor for Samsung Galaxy during the 2017 World Championship also held in China. Meanwhile, the victory marked the sixth world championship for Lee "Faker" Sang-hyeok, the first international title for top-laner Choi "Doran" Hyeon-joon, and the second consecutive time a fourth-seed won the tournament after last year's T1 roster.

== Host selection ==
During the media day for the 2024 World Championship Final at The O2 Arena in London, United Kingdom on 1 November 2024, Riot Games announced that the 2025 Final will be held in Chengdu (where the 2024 Mid-Season Invitational had been hosted). The Dong'an Lake Sports Park Multifunctional Gymnasium, which has a capacity of 18,000 people, was selected as the venue for the finals on 25 July 2025. Opened in May 2021 as part of the Dong'an Lake Sports Park, the venue hosted various sports during the 2021 Summer World University Games (rescheduled to 2023) and the 2025 World Games.

== Route to the final ==
=== KT Rolster ===
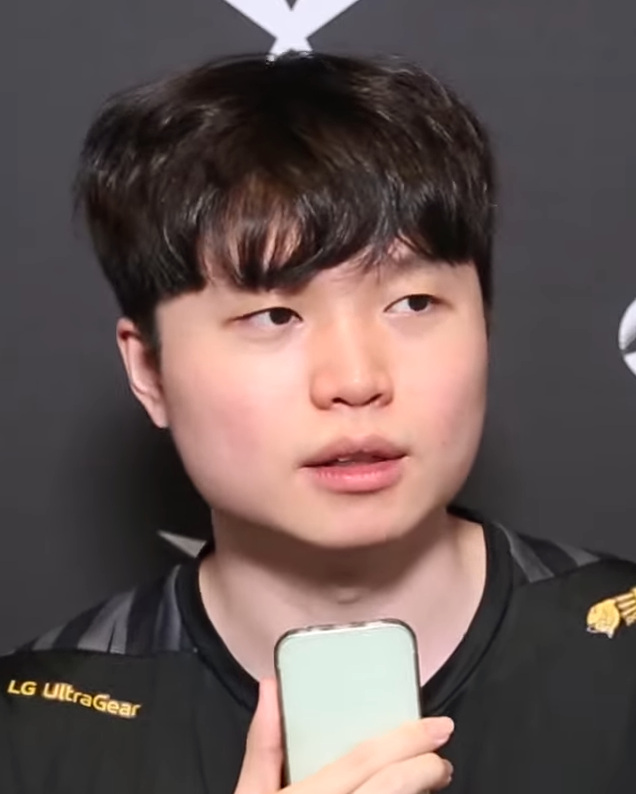
Bdd made his first World Championship final appearance in 2025.

Prior to its entry into League of Legends esports, KT Rolster was one of the most successful organizations in the Starcraft esports scene, winning the game's domestic professional league in South Korea on three occasions. The organization joined the League of Legends Champions Korea (LCK) in 2013, when the league was then known as The Champions. In its first year in the league in 2014, the organization fielded two sister teams - KT Rolster Bullets and KT Rolster Arrows, the latter of which would win the Summer Split in the same year, beating Samsung Galaxy Blue with a 3–2 scoreline. A year later, both sister teams would merge due to rule changes that prohibited organizations from owning two teams. The team also made its first League of Legends World Championship appearance in the same year, held in Europe, where they finished first in their group and made the quarterfinals. The team would not win a domestic title in the next few years, finishing as runners-up in the 2015 and 2016 Summer Splits, and the 2017 Spring Split - two of which were against SK Telecom T1, with the SKT-KT matchup continuously being dubbed as the "Telecom Wars". KT would break the drought in 2018, winning the 2018 Summer Split and qualifying for the 2018 World Championship in China, where they would again lose in the quarterfinals to Invictus Gaming of the League of Legends Pro League (LPL), 2–3. The series is widely known for its third game where both teams raced to each others' bases to destroy the nexus, a scenario commonly referred to as a "base race."

From 2019 to 2022, KT would struggle to finish in the top three in the LCK and would miss four consecutive World Championship appearances. During this period, the team's highest ranking was 5th place in the 2020 Spring Split; KT would go on to narrowly miss qualifying for the 2022 World Championship, losing to eventual world champions DRX in the second round of that year's regional finals, 2–3. Prior to the 2023 LCK season, KT re-acquired mid-lander Gwak "Bdd" Bo-seong, who joined the team from 2018 to 2019, transferring from Nongshim RedForce, joining jungler Moon "Cuzz" Woo-chan, who had been with the team since 2022. Prior to that year's Summer Split, the team called up substitute top-laner Lee "PerfecT" Seung-min from the organization's academy team, as the main top-laner at the time was Kim "Kiin" Gi-in. KT finished third in both the Spring and Summer Splits, while also qualifying for the 2023 edition of Worlds through the regional qualifiers, after a five-year drought from the tournament. The team would finish the swiss stage with a 3–2 record, qualifying for the quarterfinals in its third appearance. However, it would suffer a 1–3 defeat to the LPL's JD Gaming. Following Kiin's departure from the squad, PerfecT became the starting top-laner, while Cuzz transferred to Kwangdong Freecs and was replaced by Hong "Pyosik" Chang-hyeon for the 2024 LCK season. KT would finish 5th in both Spring and Summer Splits and also failed to qualify for the 2024 World Championship after a 2–3 defeat to eventual champions T1 in the fourth-seed decider of that year's regional finals in the LCK.

Heading into the 2025 LCK season and following Kim "Deft" Hyuk-kyu's entry into mandatory military service, ADC Seo "deokdam" Dae-gil joined the team, transferring from FunPlus Phoenix, while Cuzz was also re-acquired. KT would finish 5th-6th in the 2025 LCK Cup, losing in a 0–3 sweep to Nongshim RedForce in the first round of the playoffs. Before the first two rounds of the league's regular season, support Jeong "Peter" Yoon-su was called up from the academy team, swapping with Han "Way" Gil, who was the team's support player during the LCK Cup. KT finished 5th in Rounds 1 to 2 and were two wins away from qualifying for the 2025 Mid-Season Invitational after two 3–0 victories against Dplus Kia and Nongshim RedForce in the first two rounds of the Road to MSI tournament, but would lose to T1 in the third round, 1–3. In the final three rounds (Rounds 3-5), the squad finished 4th place in the Legend Group, taking into account its record in Rounds 1-2, qualifying for the season playoffs. KT would beat BNK FearX in the first round, 3–1, before securing an upset victory against tournament favorites Gen.G in the next round, 3–2 - qualifying for the 2025 World Championship in the process. The team would finish third after losing in a 0–3 sweep to Gen.G, who would eventually win the 2025 LCK championship, in the lower bracket final.

KT Rolster won their first game against Movistar KOI in the first round of the tournament's Swiss stage. In the second round, they would win against Secret Whales, before defeating Top Esports to advance to the knockout stage. In the quarterfinals, the team secured a 3–0 sweep against CTBC Flying Oyster, and repeated its feat against Gen.G in the semifinals with a 3–1 scoreline to advance to their first League of Legends World Championship Final.

KT's route to the final
Round	Opponent	Result
Swiss round 1	Movistar KOI	1–0
Swiss round 2	Secret Whales	1–0
Swiss round 3	Top Esports	2–0
Quarterfinals	CTBC Flying Oyster	3–0
Semifinals	Gen.G	3–1

=== T1 ===
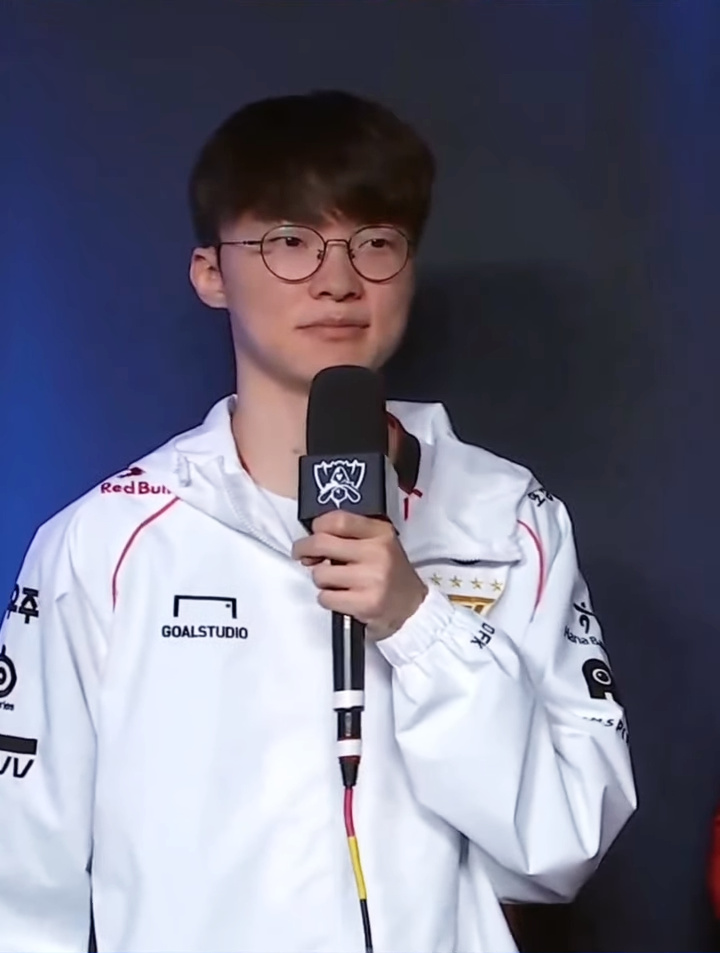
Faker made his eighth World Championship finals appearance.

Since losing the 2022 League of Legends World Championship final, T1 has seen mixed results in the League of Legends Champions Korea (LCK). During the 2023 LCK season, the squad placed second to Gen.G in both Spring and Summer Splits, qualifying for both the 2023 Mid-Season Invitational and the 2023 World Championship in the process. In MSI 2023 in London, T1 started the bracket stage with a 3–0 sweep against MAD Lions, before defeating Gen.G in the second round, 3–2, in a rematch of the Spring Split finals in the second round. However, T1 would suffer two consecutive losses in both the upper and lower bracket finals to the League of Legends Pro League (LPL)'s JD Gaming and Bilibili Gaming, respectively. During the World Championship in South Korea, T1 finished their swiss stage campaign with a 3–1 record, losing only to the LCK's first seed, Gen.G in the 1–0 bracket. Having qualified for the knockout stage, T1 went through teams from the LPL, winning against LNG Esports in a 3–0 sweep in the quarterfinals, defeating 2023 Mid-Season Invitational champions and tournament favorites JD Gaming in the semifinals, 3–1, in a rematch from the 2022 edition, and scoring a 3–0 sweep against Weibo Gaming in the finals to win their record-extending fourth world championship in their sixth finals appearance. T1 was famously the only team from the LCK to qualify for the semifinals, as fellow quarterfinalists Gen.G and KT Rolster failed to advance, losing to Bilibili Gaming and JD Gaming, respectively.

The 2024 LCK season saw T1 have an up-and-down season in both Spring and Summer Splits. In Spring, T1 placed 2nd with a 15–3 win-loss record, qualifying for the playoffs. Despite being relegated to the lower bracket following a 0–3 defeat to Hanwha Life Esports, the team won its next two matches to qualify for the split finals and the 2024 Mid-Season Invitational in Chengdu. However, T1 would lose to Gen.G in the finals, 2–3. During the Summer split, T1 had a 5–5 win-loss slate after the first five weeks but would go on to have a 6–2 record in their last eight games to finish the split, 11–7, placing fourth upon the completing of the regular season. After winning its first playoff series against KT Rolster, the squad was defeated by Hanwha Life Esports, 0–3, in a repeat result from the Spring split. Staving off elimination in their first lower bracket series against Dplus Kia, T1 would eventually be eliminated from the Summer split by Hanwha Life Esports with a 1–3 scoreline. The team was still able to qualify for the 2023 edition of Worlds through the regional qualifier, winning in the fourth-seed playoff against KT Rolster. In Worlds 2024, T1 would finish the swiss stage with a 3–1 record, qualifying for the knockout stage. The team would go on a 6–1 game score across the quarterfinals (vs. Top Esports) and semifinals (vs. Gen.G) to make its third straight finals, in which they would beat Bilibili Gaming with a 3–2 scoreline to win their fourth World Championship. Lee "Faker" Sang-hyeok would win his second Finals MVP honors alongside his fifth world title.

T1 kept four of its five players heading into the 2025 season, as Choi "Zeus" Woo-je transferred to Hanwha Life Esports. Top-laner Choi "Doran" Hyeon-joon was announced as his replacement on 19 November 2024, transferring from the same team Zeus joined. In the 2025 LCK Cup, the team finished first in their group and qualified for the play-in stage, where they would win against Nongshim RedForce, 2–0, to qualify for the playoffs. However, T1 would suffer a 2–3 loss to Hanwha Life Esports. In the first two rounds of the regular season (Rounds 1-2), T1 finished with an 11–7 win-loss slate and received a bye in the third round of the Road to MSI tournament, winning two matches against KT Rolster and Hanwha Life Esports to qualify for the 2025 Mid-Season Invitational in Vancouver. T1 started in the bracket stage at MSI 2025 with a nail-biting 3–2 win against CTBC Flying Oyster in the first round, and a 3–0 second round sweep against Bilibili Gaming in a rematch of the 2024 World Championship final. However, the team would be relegated to the lower bracket after a 2–3 defeat to Gen.G in the upper bracket final. Despite winning with another 3–2 scoreline against the LPL's Anyone's Legend in the lower bracket final, T1 would again lose to Gen.G in similar fashion, losing its first international final since the 2022 World Championship, when they lost to DRX. In Rounds 3-5, the squad finished the regular season with a 20–10 record, qualifying for the first round of playoffs, where they would beat Dplus Kia, 3–2. However, T1 would again be relegated to the lower bracket after suffering an 0–3 sweep against Hanwha Life Esports. Despite winning its first elimination series against Dplus Kia, T1 would eventually be eliminated by eventual LCK champions Gen.G in a 2–3 defeat, but still managed to qualify for the 2025 World Championship.

T1 won the play-in match against Invictus Gaming, 3–1, and its first Swiss stage match against FlyQuest, but would lose two consecutive matches to CTBC Flying Oyster and Gen.G, putting them in the 1–2 bracket and on the brink of elimination. The team would win two consecutive best-of-three series against 100 Thieves and Movistar KOI to qualify for the knockout stage. In the quarterfinals, T1 would mount a comeback victory against Anyone's Legend, 3–2, after facing a 1–2 deficit. T1 would score a 3–0 sweep against Top Esports in the semifinals to reach its eighth League of Legends World Championship Final, setting up an all-LCK final against KT Rolster.

T1's route to the final
Round	Opponent	Result
Play-in	Invictus Gaming	3–1
Swiss round 1	FlyQuest	1–0
Swiss round 2	CTBC Flying Oyster	0–1
Swiss round 3	Gen.G	0–1
Swiss round 4	100 Thieves	2–0
Swiss round 5	Movistar KOI	2–0
Quarterfinals	Anyone's Legend	3–2
Semifinals	Top Esports	3–0

== Background and pre-series ==
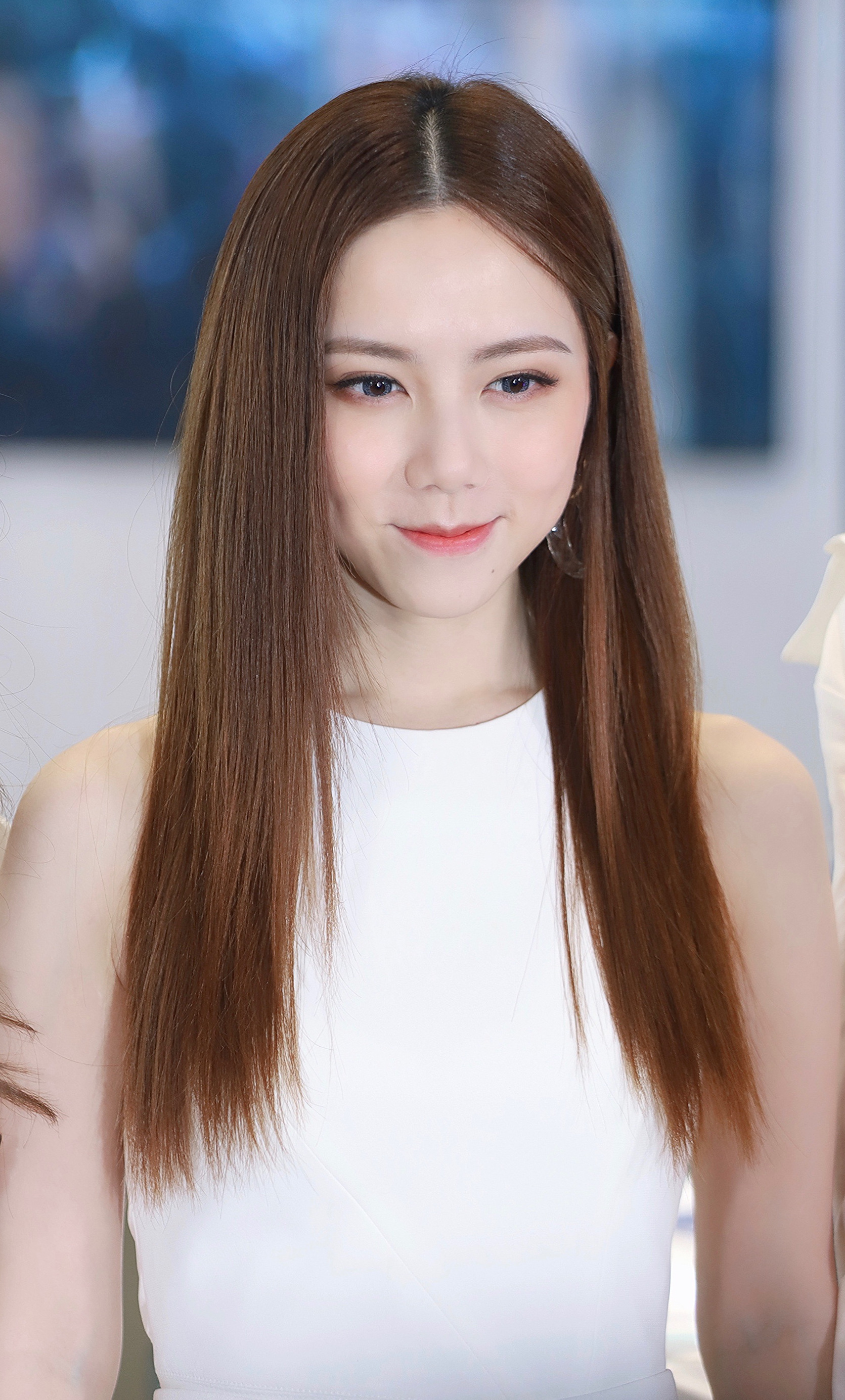
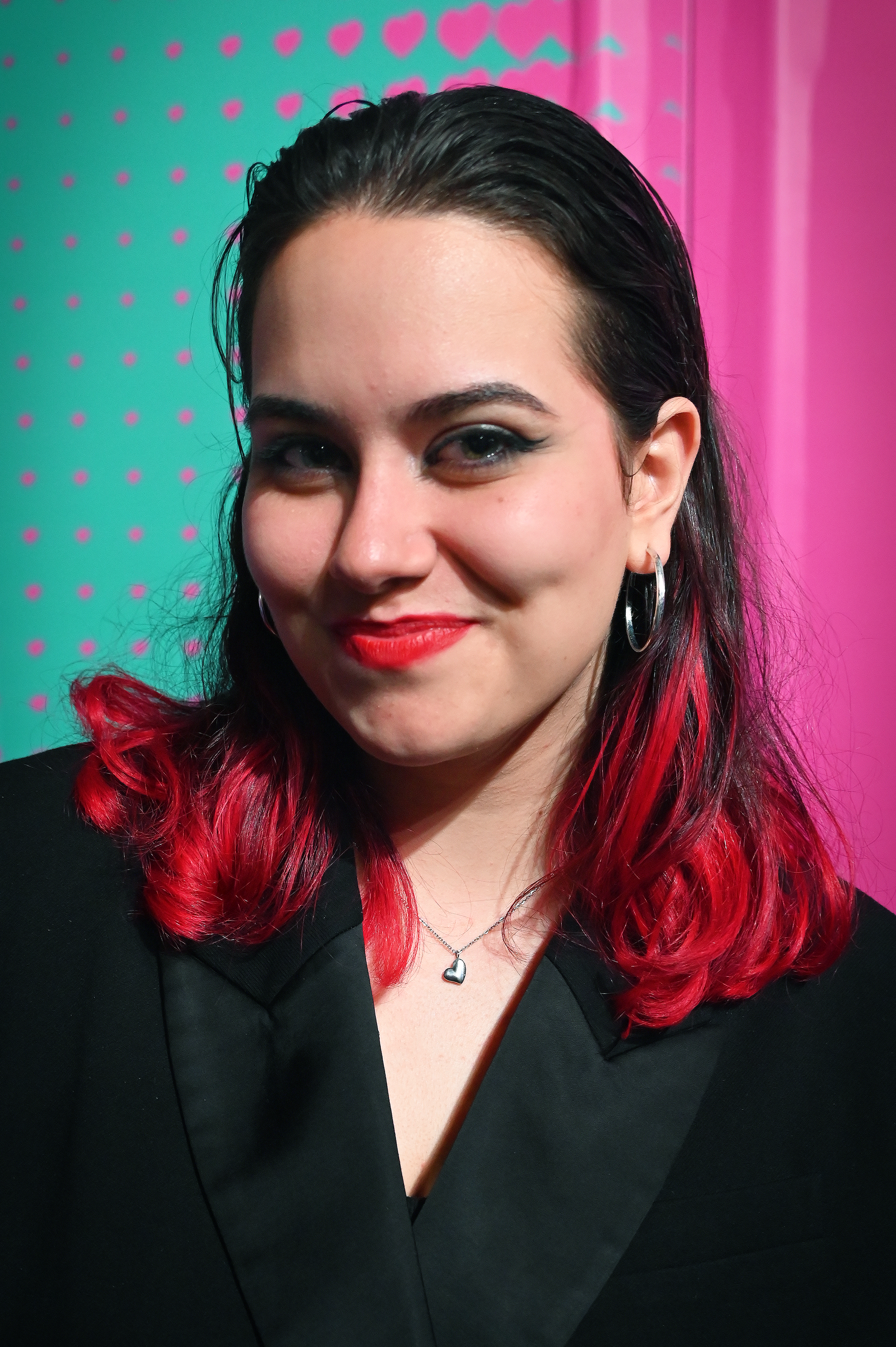
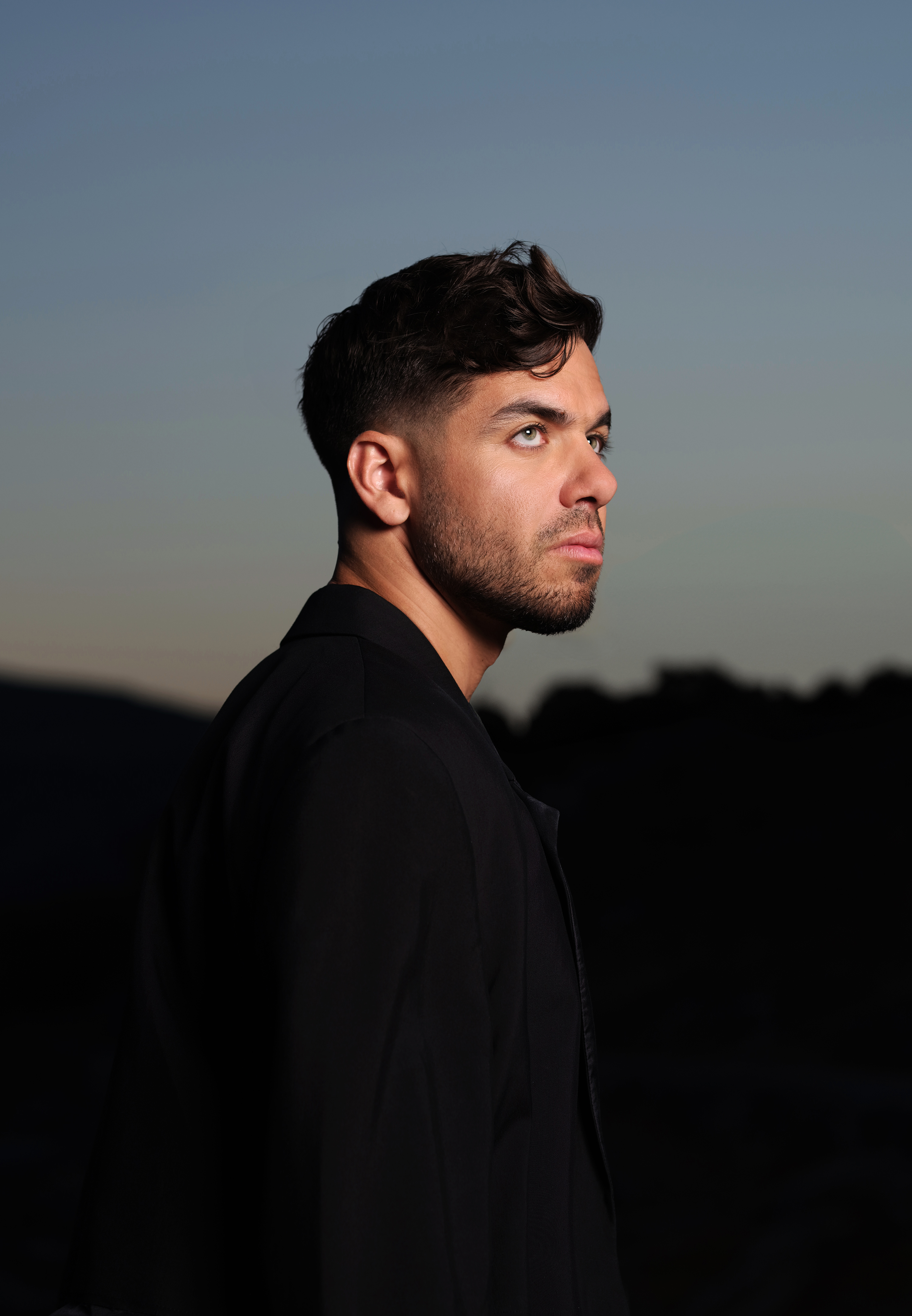
G.E.M., Teya, and Anyma performed at the opening ceremony.

KT Rolster and T1, alongside Gen.G and Hanwha Life Esports, were the LCK representatives at the 2025 World Championship. The rivalry between the two organizations, dating back to StarCraft: Brood War, is known as the "Telecommunications Rivalry" (or the "Telecom War"), as they are owned by two of South Korea's largest telecommunications companies in KT Corporation and SK Telecom respectively. Comcast Spectacor, a subsidiary of the American telecommunications company Comcast, has also held a minority ownership stake in T1 since 2019.

It was the eighth finals appearance for Lee "Faker" Sang-hyeok, the fourth finals for Moon "Oner" Hyeon-jun, Lee "Gumayusi" Min-hyeong, and Ryu "Keria" Min-seok, and the first for Choi "Doran" Hyeon-jun, who replaced Choi "Zeus" Woo-je as T1's top-laner for the 2025 competitive season following the latter's transfer to Hanwha Life Esports. Meanwhile, it was the first World Championship finals appearance for all five members of KT Rolster, but the second international final appearance for Gwak "Bdd "Bo-seong and Moon "Cuzz" Woo-chan, as they were both part of the Kingzone DragonX team that made the finals of the 2018 Mid-Season Invitational.

Against the Current lead vocalist Chrissy Costanza performed at her third World Championship final, after her appearances in 2017 and 2019.

Before the finals begin, an opening ceremony took place at 15:00 CST (UTC+08:00). The ceremony began with American singer-songwriter and Against the Current lead vocalist, Chrissy Costanza, performing a medley of "Warriors" (2014 World Championship theme song), "Phoenix" (2019 World Championship theme song), and "Legends Never Die" (2017 World Championship theme song). Costanza had performed the latter two songs during those year's editions and their respective opening ceremonies (the players were first presented to the crowd midway into the song). Austrian singer-songwriter Teya followed with a rendition of "Bite Marks", which was released in conjunction with the start of first thematic League of Legends season of 2025, entitled "Welcome to Noxus". Chinese and Hong Kong singer-songwriter G.E.M. then performed the tournament's official anthem, "Sacrifice". Italian-American electronic music producer Anyma, who also served as co-director of the opening ceremony, appeared mid-way through the song, providing a remix and visual effects, including a reveal of one of League of Legends' new in-game champions, "Zaahen". The players from KT and T1 were then introduced according to their roles, followed by the reveal of the Summoner's Cup alongside G.E.M. as she finished her performance.

The stage for the World Championship final took up all the space in the arena floor, which featured a central stage with a large LED screen and rock-like mini-stages on the sides. Throughout the ceremony, visual effects were cast on to the stage and the screen. Backup dancers also supported the first two performers in their respective performances.

== Series ==
=== Game 1 ===
Game 1 Team Compositions
Role	KT	T1
Top	Rumble	Ambessa
Jungle	Wukong	Xin Zhao
Middle	Ryze	Taliyah
ADC	Ashe	Varus
Support	Braum	Poppy

The champion selection phase for the first game commenced shortly after the conclusion of the opening ceremony. As a result of winning the coin toss prior to the series, KT were on blue side which gave them the opportunity to ban and pick the first champions of the game. In the first banning phase, KT opted to ban Bard, Keria's best champion during Rounds 3-5 of the 2025 LCK season with a 85.7% win rate, Neeko, and Yunara, the most banned champion in the tournament prior to the finals. Meanwhile T1 opted to ban Azir, Orianna, Bdd's best champion in the World Championship at this point in the tournament with an undefeated record leading up to the final with a 44.0 KDA, and Ezreal. Following the first ban phase, KT first picked Wukong for Cuzz. T1 responded by selecting Taliyah for Faker, and Varus for Gumayusi. Prior to the first game, Taliyah had been picked 21 times and banned 18 times throughout the tournament. For the remaining picks of the first pick phase, KT chose Rumble for PerfecT and Ryze for Bdd, with T1's last pick of the first selection phase being Xin Zhao for Oner. Before the second pick phase, T1 banned Ezreal and Sivir, while KT banned Alistar and Renata Glasc. As T1 were on red side, they got the first pick of the second pick phase, selecting Poppy for Keria. For their last two draft selections, KT selected Ashe for deokdam and Braum for Peter, while T1's final pick was Ambessa for Doran.

KT Rolster opened the series with a strong early game, securing First Blood through an aggressive contest in the river. Although T1 support Keria punished deokdam's overextension in the bottom lane, he fell to the turret, allowing KT to follow with an additional kill on Gumayusi. With the numbers advantage, KT claimed the first dragon and three uncontested Voidgrubs. KT extended their lead by collapsing on T1's attempted gank and later winning control around the second dragon, which they secured alongside the first Rift Herald. However, the early advantage was overturned during the fight for the third dragon, where T1 won the engagement, took the objective, and erased KT's lead. From that point forward, T1 outperformed KT in major team fights, winning engagements around Atakhan, Baron Nashor, and another Drake. While KT continued to pick up occasional kills, they would still lose team fights and objectives. Keria's Poppy played a key role in T1's mid-game turnaround, frequently creating numbers advantages and dealing solid damage. After another Baron buff, T1 pushed through KT's base to win Game 1.

Game 1	36:09	KT Rolster	11	–	25	T1	Chengdu, China
		T1 leads series 1–0					Dong'an Lake Sports Park Multifunctional Gymnasium
		K/D/A: 11/25/19; Gold: 61.3K; Turrets: 2 Drakes: 2 Elder Dragons: 0 Barons: 0 Rift Heralds: 1 Voidgrubs: 3	Game Stats			K/D/A: 25/11/70; Gold: 75.2K; Turrets: 9 Drakes: 3 Elder Dragons: 0 Barons: 2 Rift Heralds: 0 Voidgrubs: 0	

=== Game 2 ===
Game 2 Team Compositions
Role	KT	T1
Top	Rek'Sai	Sion
Jungle	Vi	Jarvan IV
Middle	Mel	Sylas
ADC	Ezreal	Sivir
Support	Neeko	Lulu

For the first banning phase of the second game, KT banned Bard, Trundle, and Caitlyn, while T1 chose to ban Azir, Orianna, and Yunara. Similar to the first game, KT were on blue side giving them the chance to select the first champion in the first picking phase, selecting Neeko for Peter, who had a 100% winning rate during the tournament prior to the finals with two victories. In response, Sion was picked by T1 for Doran and Jarvan IV for Oner. Rounding out their first three picks, Vi was selected for Cuzz and Rek'Sai for PerfecT. Before the finals, Vi had a 4-12 win-loss record throughout the World Championship. T1 concluded the first selection phase by picking Sivir for Gumayusi. In the second banning phase, T1 banned Yone and Kai'Sa, while KT banned Alistar and Galio, the latter of which is a champion Faker had 14 assists on in T1's second game victory against Top Esports in the semifinals. Still on red side, T1 selected Lulu for Keria, while KT rounded out their picks with Ezreal for deokdam and Mel for Bdd - a champion that had been picked only twice prior to the finals. Finishing the draft, T1 picked Sylas for Faker, who used the champion 11 times during the domestic season and had a 7-4 win-loss slate while using it.

In Game 2, KT Rolster claimed First Blood through a bottom-lane dive onto Gumayusi. While T1 secured the first dragon, they chose not to contest the Voidgrubs. KT then initiated a skirmish in mid lane, winning it two-for-one and extending their lead to roughly 2,000 gold. T1's attempt to pressure the top lane was again countered, allowing KT to take the first turret and the Rift Herald. Although T1 eliminated Cuzz's Vi to begin a team fight and emerged with the victory despite suffering losses, KT regrouped after respawns, secured an Ace, and used the opportunity to take Atakhan along with another dragon. Much of KT's mid-game pressure came from Bdd's Mel, whose individual lead enabled strong lane control and facilitated rapid turret destruction with the help of earlier Voidgrub stacks. T1 found moments of their own, such as Doran's ambush to pick off deokdam. However, KT continued to control the map, even contesting Baron, not to take it, but to delay T1's soul point. Cuzz later slipped into the pit to secure KT's third dragon. T1 attempted to convert this into a Baron take, but KT forced them away. With a pick onto Faker, KT won the ensuing team fight and claimed the Baron buff. They then broke into T1's base, won another fight near the Dragon, secured the Chemtech Soul, and destroyed one of T1's Nexus turrets. With their second Baron of the game, KT re-entered the base and closed out Game 2, evening the series.

Game 2	42:32	KT Rolster	24	–	15	T1	Chengdu, China
		Series tied 1–1					Dong'an Lake Sports Park Multifunctional Gymnasium
		K/D/A: 24/15/56; Gold: 88.5K; Turrets: 12; Drakes: 4 Elder Dragons: 0 Barons: 2 Rift Heralds: 1 Voidgrubs: 3	Game Stats			K/D/A: 15/24/36; Gold: 76.4K; Turrets: 3 Drakes: 2 Elder Dragons: 0 Barons: 0 Rift Heralds: 0 Voidgrubs: 0	

=== Game 3 ===
Game 3 Team Compositions
Role	T1	KT
Top	Renekton	K'Sante
Jungle	Viego	Dr. Mundo
Middle	Viktor	Syndra
ADC	Yunara	Corki
Support	Rakan	Alistar

Now on blue side for the third game, T1 banned Yone, Trundle, and Pantheon, while KT banned Bard, Azir, and Orianna. The first selection phase of the game saw T1 select Yunara for Gumayusi, with KT choosing Alistar for Peter and Dr. Mundo for Cuzz, a champion Oner used in T1's series-winning Game 5 win against Anyone's Legend in the quarterfinals. Completing the first picking phase, T1 picked Rakan for Keria and Renekton for Doran, where he is undefeated at this point in the tournament with two victories, while KT chose Corki for deokdam. In the final banning phase of Game 3, KT opted to ban Lillia and Galio while T1 banned Zoe and Cassiopeia, a champion Bdd had an average KDA of 15 in two victories during the tournament prior to the finals. Beginning the second picking phase, KT selected K'Sante for PerfecT, with T1 picking Viktor for Faker and Viego for Oner to complete their draft. KT then picked Syndra for Bdd to finish the Game 3 draft.

Game 3 ended with a scoreline of 36 minutes and 51 seconds and a kill scoreline of 23-9 in favor of KT, winning Game 3 to put the team at match point.

Game 3	36:51	T1	9	–	23	KT Rolster	Chengdu, China
		KT leads series 2–1					Dong'an Lake Sports Park Multifunctional Gymnasium
		K/D/A: 23/9/56; Gold: 70.9K; Turrets: 8 Drakes: 4 Elder Dragons: 0 Barons: 1 Rift Heralds: 0 Voidgrubs: 0	Game Stats			K/D/A: 9/23/20; Gold: 64.9K; Turrets: 5 Drakes: 2 Elder Dragons: 0 Barons: 0 Rift Heralds: 1 Voidgrubs: 3	

=== Game 4 ===
Game 4 Team Compositions
Role	T1	KT
Top	Gragas	Mordekaiser
Jungle	Nocturne	Trundle
Middle	Anivia	Cassiopeia
ADC	Kalista	Caitlyn
Support	Renata Glasc	Tahm Kench

KT was on match point with one win away from their first World Championship. Returning to blue side, T1 again had the opportunity to ban and pick the first champions of the game. In the first banning phase, T1 banned Yone, Pantheon, and Ziggs, a champion deokdam used in KT's series-clinching quarterfinal victory in the third game against CTBC Flying Oyster. Meanwhile, KT opted to ban Bard, Azir, and Orianna for the second consecutive game. Kalista was T1's first pick for Gumayusi, a champion that had a famously worse win rate during the 2025 Mid-Season Invitational. KT then selected Trundle for Cuzz and Caitlyn for deokdam, while T1 picked Nocturne for Oner and Renata Glasc for Keria, the latter of which to compliment the first pick. KT responded by locking in Cassiopeia for Bdd, whom he had a 2-0 record with during the World Championship prior to the finals, including in their series-clinching semifinal victory in Game 4 against Gen.G. Before the second pick phase, KT banned Galio and Hwei, while T1 chose to ban Ornn, which had a 63.6% win rate in the tournament at that point, and Yorick. Beginning the second picking phase, KT picked Tahm Kench for Peter, the first time the champion had been picked in the event, with T1 responding by picking Anivia for Faker and Gragas for Doran, one of his most-picked champions of his playing career. KT completed the draft by choosing Mordekaiser for PerfecT.

Game 4 ended with a time of 29 minutes and 40 seconds and a kill scoreline of 17-8 in favor of T1, forcing a deciding fifth and final game - marking the fourth World Championship fifth game in five years since the 2021 edition.

Game 4	29:40	T1	17	–	8	KT Rolster	Chengdu, China
		Series tied 2–2					Dong'an Lake Sports Park Multifunctional Gymnasium
		K/D/A: 17/8/47; Gold: 58.9K; Turrets: 10; Drakes: 4 Elder Dragons: 0 Barons: 1 Rift Heralds: 1 Voidgrubs: 3	Game Stats			K/D/A: 8/17/22; Gold: 43.8K; Turrets: 0 Drakes: 0 Elder Dragons: 0 Barons: 0 Rift Heralds: 0 Voidgrubs: 0	

=== Game 5 ===
Game 5 Team Compositions
Role	KT	T1
Top	Yorick	Camille
Jungle	Sejuani	Pantheon
Middle	Smolder	Galio
ADC	Ziggs	Miss Fortune
Support	Nautilus	Leona

Heading into Game 5, the teams in both blue and red sides had won two games each. KT was on blue side whilst T1 was in red. The first banning phase saw KT ban Bard, Draven, and Ornn and T1 ban Azir, Orianna, and Yone, which meant that Bard, Azir, Yone, and Orianna were the only champions to be banned in all five games. In the first picking phase, KT selected Ziggs for deokdam and T1 chose Pantheon for Oner and Galio for Faker, one of his most well-known champions to use. KT wrapped up their first three picks by selecting Yorick for PerfecT, considered as a blind pick, and Nautilus for Peter. For their final pick before the next banning phase, T1 decided to go with Camille for Doran, a champion whom he had three victories with during the 2025 LCK season and T1's semifinal victory over Top Esports, where he had a 4/2/12 K/D/A in one game during the series. For their final two bans, KT opted to ban Kai'Sa and Jhin, while T1 banned Maokai and Skarner. In the final picking phase of the series, T1 locked in Miss Fortune for Gumayusi, who had a 6-4 record with the champion prior to the World Championship. In their final two picks, KT selected Sejuani for Cuzz and Smolder for Bdd, a champion he had not used since the 2024 LCK season. The final selection of the series was Leona for Keria.

Game 5 ended with a time of 36 minutes and 46 seconds and a scoreline of 23-11 in favor of T1, winning their sixth World Championship and becoming the first team in League of Legends history to win three consecutive world titles.

Game 5	36:46	KT Rolster	11	–	23	T1	Chengdu, China
		T1 wins series 3–2					Dong'an Lake Sports Park Multifunctional Gymnasium
		K/D/A: 11/23/30; Gold: 61.2K; Turrets: 1 Drakes: 2 Elder Dragons: 0 Barons: 0 Rift Heralds: 1 Voidgrubs: 1	Game Stats			K/D/A: 23/11/55; Gold: 74.6K; Turrets: 10; Drakes: 4 Elder Dragons: 0 Barons: 1 Rift Heralds: 0 Voidgrubs: 2	

== Rosters ==
KT Rolster

2025 KT Rolster League of Legends roster
Players
Coaches

Role	Handle	Name	Nationality
Top	PerfecT	Lee Seung-min	South Korea
Jungle	Cuzz	Moon Woo-chan	South Korea
Mid	Bdd	Gwak Bo-seong	South Korea
Bot	deokdam	Seo Dae-gil	South Korea
Support	Peter	Jeong Yoon-su	South Korea

Head coach

- Go "Score" Dong-bin

Assistant coach(es)

- Park "Highness" Ji-won
- Kim "Museong" Moo-seong
- Son "Sonstar" Seung-ik

Legend:
- (I) Inactive
- (S) Suspended
- Substitute
- (injured) Injury / Illness

Roster updated 18 March 2025.

T1

2025 T1 League of Legends roster
Players
Coaches

Role	Handle	Name	Nationality
Top	Doran	Choi Hyeon-jun	South Korea
Jungle	Oner	Mun Hyeon-jun	South Korea
Mid	Faker	Lee Sang-hyeok	South Korea
Bot	Gumayusi	Lee Min-hyeong	South Korea
Support	Keria	Ryu Min-seok	South Korea

Head coach

Kim "kkOma" Jeong-gyun

Assistant coach(es)

Im "Tom" Jae-hyeon
Cho "Mata" Se-hyeong

Legend:
- (I) Inactive
- (S) Suspended
- Substitute
- (injured) Injury / Illness

Roster updated 22 November 2024.

== Post-series ==
T1's victory marked the first three-peat world championship feat by a team in tournament history. Their victory also makes them only the second team to win the title after starting from the play-in stage (DRX, who defeated T1 in the 2022 final, also started from play-ins). The tournament had a base prize pool of US$5 million. Of this, the winners, T1, received 20% ($1,000,000) of the pool. For coming second, KT was rewarded 16% ($800,000).

As with previous world champions, T1 has worked directly with Riot Games' visual department to release skins for the champions of their choosing. The players could choose any champion they've played over the whole tournament. Additionally, Gumayusi has received a second skin due to being chosen as the MVP.

T1 2025 World Championship Skins
Player	Chosen Champion(s)
Doran	Ambessa
Oner	Xin Zhao
Faker	Galio
Gumayusi	Yunara, Miss Fortune (MVP)
Keria	Seraphine

Of the ten (10) players that competed in the final, three (3) had expiring contracts by 17 November 2025, namely deokdam and Peter of KT Rolster, and Finals MVP Gumayusi of T1. On the same day, T1 announced ADC Gumayusi's departure after a seven-year stint with the organization since his inclusion as a trainee in 2018. The following day, KT Rolster announced that ADC deokdam and support Peter parted ways with the organization. All other players with the exception of Faker and Keria, who renewed their contract with T1 until 2029, are currently signed between 2026 and 2028.

== Broadcasting ==
The English broadcast was cast by Daniel Drakos of the League of Legends EMEA Championship, Maurits "Chronicler" Jan Meeusen of the League of Legends Champions Korea, and Sam "Kobe" Hartman-Kenzler of the League Championship Series. Drakos cast his first World Championship final, having cast the 2024 Mid-Season Invitational final, also held in Chengdu. It was also Kobe's fourth finals cast in five years, having been on the broadcast for the 2021, 2022, and 2024 finals previously, and the second and last finals cast for Chronicler following his decision to retire from esports at the end of the 2025 season.

The Chinese broadcast was cast by Wang "Remember" Chi-te and Feng "Rita" Yu of the League of Legends Pro League, with Hall of Legends 2025 inductee Jian "Uzi" Zihao and Chinese actor Luo Yunxi joining them. Meanwhile, the Korean cast was led by Chun "Caster Jun" Yong-jun, Lee "CloudTemplar" Hyun-woo, and Go "Ggoggo" Su-jin of the League of Legends Champions Korea.

Livestreaming of the series was primarily held on the official LoL Esports website, the Riot Games Twitch channel, and the LoL Esports YouTube and TikTok channels for the English broadcast. In China, South Korea and Vietnam, the finals were streamed live via select streaming platforms, while official broadcasts on multiple languages were available via Twitch, YouTube and TikTok. Co-streaming by several streaming personalities were included in the finals' broadcasting. Across certain countries, viewing parties were also set in multiple locations. The viewing party in Manila, Philippines went ahead as scheduled despite extreme weather conditions in the area brought about by Super Typhoon Fung-wong (locally known as Uwan).

APAC

- Australia: Melbourne, Sydney
- China: Beijing, Chengdu, Hangzhou, Shanghai, Suzhou, Xi'an
- Indonesia: Jakarta
- Malaysia: Kuala Lumpur
- New Zealand: Auckland
- Philippines: Manila
- South Korea: Seoul
- Taiwan: Taipei, Taoyuan, Zhubei
- Thailand: Bangkok
- Vietnam: Bình Dương, Can Tho, Da Lat, Da Nang, Haiphong, Hanoi, Ho Chi Minh City, Nha Trang, Quảng Ninh, Quy Nhon

Americas

- Argentina: Córdoba
- Canada: Richmond, Toronto, Windsor
- Chile: Santiago
- Mexico: Mexico City
- United States: Ann Arbor, Costa Mesa, New York City, Portland, San Jose, Santa Barbara, Sioux Falls

EMEA

- Albania: Tirana
- Egypt: Cairo
- France: Le Soler
- Greece: Athens, Katerini, Komotini, Thessaloniki, Veria
- Ireland: Cork
- Kuwait: Kuwait City
- Morocco: Casablanca
- Oman: Muscat
- Poland: Gdańsk
- Saudi Arabia: Jeddah, Riyadh
- Spain: A Coruña, Alicante, Barcelona, Córdoba, Madrid, Málaga, Seville, Tomelloso, Valencia, Valladolid, Vigo, Zaragoza
- Switzerland: Bern
- Tunisia: Tunis
- Turkey: Adana, Alanya, Ankara, Antalya, Bartın, Bolu, Çanakkale, Denizli, Edirne, Elazığ, Gaziantep, Isparta, Istanbul, İzmir, Kastamonu, Konya, Sakarya, Samsun, Şanlıurfa, Tekirdağ, Trabzon
- United Arab Emirates: Abu Dhabi, Dubai
- United Kingdom: Bath, Belfast, Birmingham, Brighton and Hove, Bristol, Coventry, Egham, Exeter, Glasgow, Kent, Leeds, Liverpool, London, Loughborough, Manchester, Newcastle upon Tyne, Northampton, Nottingham, Oxford, Portsmouth, Sheffield, Southampton, Sunderland
