= Mercedes-Benz Arena =

There are multiple stadiums sponsored by Mercedes-Benz named Mercedes-Benz Arena.

Mercedes-Benz Arena may refer to:

- Mercedes-Benz Arena (Shanghai), China
- The MHPArena (2015–2024: Mercedes-Benz Arena), stadium located in Stuttgart, Baden-Württemberg, Germany, and is the home to Bundesliga club VfB Stuttgart.
- Uber Arena (2008–2023: Mercedes-Benz Arena), multipurpose indoor arena in the Friedrichshain neighborhood of Berlin, Germany and os the home to the Eisbären Berlin ice hockey club and the Alba Berlin basketball team

== See also ==
- Mercedes-Benz Stadium, retractable roof multi-purpose stadium in Atlanta, Georgia, United States, and is the home of the Atlanta Falcons of the National Football League (NFL) and Atlanta United FC of Major League Soccer (MLS)
- Caesars Superdome (2011–2021: Mercedes-Benz Superdome), domed multi-purpose stadium in New Orleans, Louisiana, USA, and is the home stadium of the New Orleans Saints of the National Football League (NFL).
