= Doran (gamer) =

South Korean esports player (born 2000)

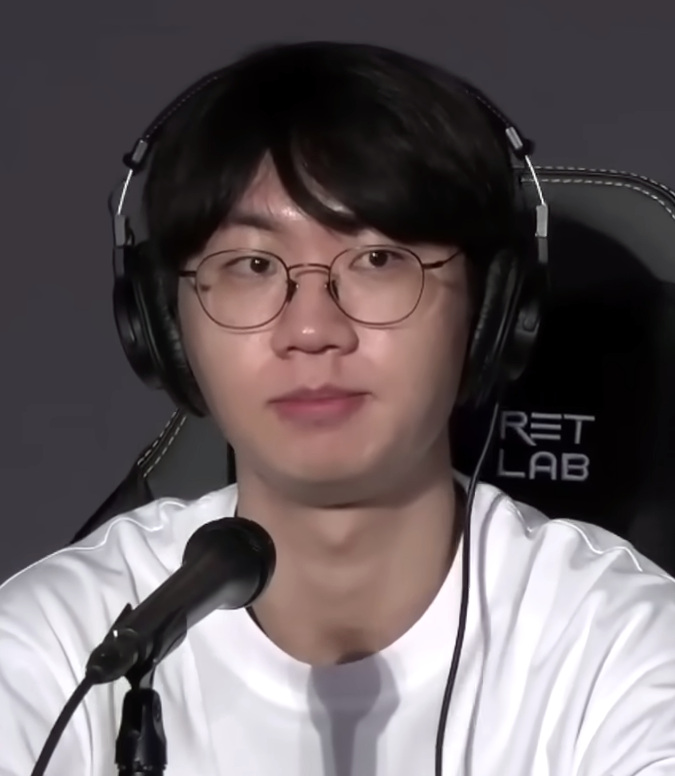
- Doran in 2025

Personal information
- Name: 최현준 (Choi Hyeon-joon)
- Born: July 22, 2000 (age 26); Changwon, South Korea
- Nationality: South Korean

Current team
- Team: Dplus KIA
- Role: Top
- Game: League of Legends
- League: LCK

Career information
- Playing career: 2018–present

Team history
- 2018: KeG Seoul
- 2018–2019: Griffin
- 2019–2020: DragonX
- 2021–2023: Gen.G
- 2023–2024: Hanwha Life Esports
- 2025–2026: T1
- 2027–present: Dplus KIA

Career highlights and awards
- World champion (2025); 4× LCK champion; 4× LCK Second All-Pro Team; 3× LCK Third All-Pro Team; KeSPA Cup champion (2025)

Choi Hyeon-joon (Korean: 최현준; born July 22, 2000), better known as Doran, is a South Korean professional League of Legends player for Dplus KIA of the League of Legends Champions Korea (LCK). He won the 2025 League of Legends World Championship as a member of T1.

== Career ==
=== KeG Seoul and Griffin (2017–2019) ===
Doran joined the Seoul national team in 2017 and the following year, he competed in the KeG Championship and KeSPA Cup. In the opening round of the knockout stage of the KeSPA Cup, Seoul defeated HLE but they were eliminated by DWG. After graduating from high school, Doran joined Griffin's youth training program. Griffin headed into the 2019 LCK Summer Split with a new top laner, Choi "Doran" Hyeon-joon, and finished the regular season in first place with a 13–5 record. This placement secured the team a bye to the finals and a spot in the 2019 World Championship, as a series victory would give them a direct qualification as the LCK's first seed, while a series loss would still earn them the most championship points and qualification as the LCK's second seed. Griffin lost to SKT in the finals, with Griffin only managing to take a single game off SKT.

=== DragonX (2020) ===
In late 2019, Doran transferred to DragonX. His team would lose to Damwon Gaming in the 2020 LCK summer finals. With DragonX, he also took part in the 2020 World Championship, where his team was eliminated by DAMWON in the quarterfinals.

=== KT Rolster (2021) ===
At the end of 2020, Doran joined KT Rolster. During the 2021 season, his team failed to qualify for the Spring and Summer Split.

=== Gen.G (2022–2023) ===
Doran joined Gen.G in 2022. During the 2022 LCK Summer Split, his team won their first LCK championship, defeating T1 in the final 3–0 to qualify as the first seed for the 2022 World Championship. They also won the 2023 Spring and Summer Splits.

=== Hanwha Life Esports (2024) ===
Doran played for Hanwha Life Esports in 2024. His team won the Summer Split by defeating his former team Gen.G by five games.

=== T1 (2025–2026) ===
In November 2024, Doran signed with T1. While his team finished in third place in the first two round of the LCK, they defeated KT and HLE to qualify as the second seed in the Mid-Season Invitational. In the MSI final, T1 lost to Gen.G. In November, they won the World Championship finals, thus giving Doran his first world title.

On November 19, 2026, Doran parted ways with T1.

=== Dplus KIA (2027–present) ===
On November 20, 2026, Doran was signed by Dplus KIA.
