= 2025 League of Legends World Championship =

15th competition of the League of Legends World Championship

Tournament information
- Sport: League of Legends
- Location: China
- Dates: 14 October–9 November
- Administrator: Riot Games
- Hosts: Beijing (Play-Ins & Swiss Stages); Shanghai (Quarterfinals & Semifinals); Chengdu (Final)
- Venue: 3 (in 3 host cities)
- Teams: 17
- Purse: US$5,000,000

Final positions
- Champions: T1
- Runner-up: KT Rolster

Tournament statistics
- MVP: Lee "Gumayusi" Min-hyeong (T1)
- Highest KDA: Park "Viper" Do-hyeon (8.1) (Hanwha Life Esports)
- Highest Kills: Park "Ruler" Jae-hyuk (14) (Gen.G)

The 2025 League of Legends World Championship (Chinese: 2025英雄联盟全球总决赛) was an esports tournament for the multiplayer online battle arena video game League of Legends, held in China from 14 October to 9 November in Beijing, Shanghai, and Chengdu. It was the fifteenth iteration of the League of Legends World Championship, an annual international tournament organised by the game's developer, Riot Games.

China hosted the event for the third time, having previously hosted it in 2017 and 2020. It was the first edition held under Riot Games' new split structure and competitive calendar, and the first to feature the Fearless Draft format. Seventeen teams qualified based on placement within their regional leagues and results gained in the 2025 Mid-Season Invitational (MSI).

The finals took place at the Dong'an Lake Sports Park Multifunctional Gymnasium in Chengdu, where T1 of the League of Legends Champions Korea (LCK) successfully defended their title once again after defeating fellow Korean representatives KT Rolster with a 3–2 scoreline. The organization subsequently won its record-extending sixth World Championship, and became the first team to win three consecutive world titles. The final's MVP was awarded to Lee "Gumayusi" Min-hyeong, who became the first ADC player to win the award since Park "Ruler" Jae-hyuk in 2017.

== Background ==
China first hosted the League of Legends World Championship in 2017, with Wuhan, Guangzhou, Shanghai, and Beijing serving as host cities. The 2020 edition of Worlds was China's second hosting of the event, but was held under restrictions due to the COVID-19 pandemic in mainland China, prompting Riot Games to stage the event through the use of an "isolation bubble" environment in Shanghai, with the exception of the Final at the Pudong Football Stadium where a limited number of fans were allowed to attend.

China was once again awarded the hosting rights to the tournament on 16 June 2021, when Riot Games originally announced the dates and locations of the 2021 League of Legends World Championship, with the event taking place in Shanghai, Qingdao, Wuhan, Chengdu, and the finals taking place in Shenzhen. However, due to travel complications arising from the COVID-19 pandemic in the country, Riot Games announced Reykjavík, Iceland (where the 2021 Mid-Season Invitational had been hosted), as the new host city for the event.

=== Host selection ===
On 24 October 2024, alongside its announcement of an extended sponsorship agreement with Chinese smartphone manufacturer OPPO, Riot Games announced that the 15th edition of the League of Legends World Championship in 2025 will be staged in China, marking the third time the country has hosted the tournament and the first since 2017 for China to host the event without travel restrictions.

== Venues ==
During the media day for the 2024 World Championship Final at The O2 Arena in London, United Kingdom on 1 November 2024, Riot Games announced that the 2025 Final would be held in Chengdu (where the 2024 Mid-Season Invitational had been hosted).

In a development update video published by Riot Games on 8 January 2025 to begin the 2025 competitive season, Beijing and Shanghai were announced as the host cities for the play-in stage / swiss stage, and the quarterfinals / semifinals, respectively. Both cities previously hosted the Worlds Final, namely the 2017 and 2020 editions.

The full list of venues for the tournament was announced on 25 July 2025. The Beijing Smart Esports Center played host to the play-in and swiss stages and is the home venue of the League of Legends Pro League's JD Gaming. The Mercedes-Benz Arena in Shanghai, which staged the Shanghai Masters of the 2024 Valorant Champions Tour, staged the quarterfinals and semifinals. The finals was held at the multifunctional gymnasium of the Dong'an Lake Sports Park in Chengdu.

China
Beijing	Shanghai	Chengdu
Play-ins and Swiss Stage	Quarterfinals and Semifinals	Finals
Beijing Smart Esports Center	Mercedes-Benz Arena	Dong'an Lake Sports Park; Multifunctional Gymnasium
Capacity: 2,000	Capacity: 18,000	Capacity: 18,000
Oct 14 – Oct 25	Oct 28 – Nov 2	Nov 9
		成都东安湖体育公园_Chengdu_Dong'an_Lake_Sports_Park_1
2025 League of Legends World Championship is located in China

== Qualification ==
By virtue of finishing as the two best performing regions in the 2025 Mid-Season Invitational, the League of Legends Champions Korea (LCK) and the League of Legends Pro League (LPL) qualified four teams each to the tournament, three of whom automatically qualified for the Swiss stage while the fourth seeds contested the final Swiss stage spot in the play-in stage. Meanwhile, the League of Legends EMEA Championship (LEC), League of Legends Championship of The Americas (LTA), and the League of Legends Championship Pacific (LCP) had three directly qualified teams each to the Swiss stage.

This was the first World Championship featuring the LCP, a new Asia-Pacific league consisting of a merger between the Pacific Championship Series (PCS), Vietnam Championship Series (VCS), League of Legends Japan League (LJL) and League of Legends Circuit Oceania (LCO). This was also the first and only World Championship featuring the LTA, a merger between the League Championship Series (LCS), Campeonato Brasileiro de League of Legends (CBLOL), and Liga Latinoamérica (LLA). The LTA was announced to be discontinued on 28 September 2025, with the LCS and CBLOL returning in 2026.

=== Qualified teams ===
Gen.G of the LCK became the first team to make the tournament on 23 July 2025 through its qualification for the LCK Playoffs and through winning the 2025 Mid-Season Invitational. On 6 September, CTBC Flying Oyster and PSG Talon became the first two teams to qualify from the LCP. The next day, G2 Esports of the LEC became the first Western team to advance to Worlds, with the LTA Conference Champions FlyQuest (North) and Vivo Keyd Stars (South) following suit hours later. On 8 September, Movistar KOI confirmed its qualification for the event. On 13 and 14 September, KT Rolster and Hanwha Life Esports qualified from the LCK, as well as Team Secret Whales from the LCP. Bilibili Gaming became the first LPL team to secure their spot in the tournament on 15 September.

Defending champions T1 of the LCK qualified for the World Championship on 18 September, with the LPL's Anyone's Legend and the LTA's 100 Thieves securing their spot three days later in their respective regions. On 25 September, Top Esports of the LPL confirmed its qualification, with Fnatic being the last LEC team to qualify on 26 September. The next day, the LPL's Invictus Gaming became the final team to clich their spot in the tournament.

This was the first World Championship appearance for the LPL's Anyone's Legend and the LTA's Vivo Keyd Stars. Meanwhile, it was the first tournament for the LCP's Team Secret Whales and the LEC's Movistar KOI under their current names. Secret Whales appeared at the play-in stage of the 2019 League of Legends World Championship as "Lowkey Esports" of the former Vietnam Championship Series (VCS), (Note: Lowkey Esports was acquired by Team Secret in February 2020, with the latter acquiring Team Whales in December 2024.) while Movistar KOI qualified for seven World Championships prior to its most recent name change in December 2024. (Note: Movistar KOI launched in January 2024 as a result of a merger between KOI, Movistar Riders and MAD Lions, with the merger being finalized in December of the same year.)

100 Thieves of the LTA made its final appearance at the World Championship, as the organization announced on 19 July 2025 that it would leave the league after the conclusion of the 2025 competitive season.

The teams that qualified for the event are:

Region	League	Qualification Path	Team
Starting from Swiss stage
South Korea	LCK		
South Korea	LCK	Season Champion; 2025 Mid-Season Invitational Winner	Gen.G
South Korea	LCK	Season Runner-Up	Hanwha Life Esports
South Korea	LCK	Season 3rd Place	KT Rolster
Asia-Pacific	LCP	Season Champion	CTBC Flying Oyster
Asia-Pacific	LCP	Season Runner-Up	Secret Whales
Asia-Pacific	LCP	Season 3rd Place	PSG Talon
EMEA	LEC	Summer Champion	G2 Esports
EMEA	LEC	Summer Runner-Up	Movistar KOI
EMEA	LEC	Summer 3rd Place	Fnatic
China	LPL	Split 3 Champion	Bilibili Gaming
China	LPL	Championship Points	Anyone's Legend
China	LPL	Regional Qualifiers 3rd Seed Playoff Winner	Top Esports
Americas	LTA	Season Champion; LTA North Split 3 Champion	FlyQuest
Americas	LTA	Season 2nd Place; LTA South Split 3 Champion	Vivo Keyd Stars
Americas	LTA	Season 3rd Place	100 Thieves
Starting from Play-in stage
South Korea	LCK	Season 4th Place	T1
China	LPL	Regional Qualifiers 4th Seed Playoff Winner	Invictus Gaming

=== Pre-tournament rankings ===
Following its introduction during last year's tournament, Riot Games continued to use its Global Power Rankings to evaluate and reflect the overall strength of teams, based on their regional league performances and international event results throughout the season. Ahead of the 2025 League of Legends World Championship, Gen.G ranked first with 1,627 points, followed by Hanwha Life Esports with 1,569 points. T1, the defending champion, placed third with 1,538 points, while Anyone's Legend and Bilibili Gaming rounded out the Top 5.

== Format ==
The fourth-seeded teams from the LCK and LPL, as a result of obtaining an additional slot from the 2025 Mid-Season Invitational, played one best-of-five series to determine the last team to qualify for the tournament's swiss stage. Sixteen (16) teams competed in the swiss stage, where the first eight (8) teams to achieve three (3) wins advanced to the knockout stage, which was a single-elimination bracket. All matches in the knockout stage were expected to be best-of-fives.

This was also the first World Championship to adopt the Fearless Draft format, where champions that have been played by either team become unavailable for both teams for the remainder of the series. While Fearless Draft was intended to only be used during the first split of the season, Riot Games announced prior to the final of the 2025 First Stand Tournament that it would apply for the rest of the year, including MSI and Worlds, after it received "overwhelming" positive feedback during that period. Fearless Draft was used for all best-of-3 and best-of-5 series during the World Championship.

== Play-in stage ==
Being the fourth-seeded teams of their respective regions, T1 of the LCK and Invictus Gaming of the LPL competed in a best-of-five series to determine the final qualified team for the tournament's Swiss stage. T1 qualified for the Swiss stage, defeating IG in a 3–1 scoreline.

Match 1	14 October	Invictus Gaming	1	–	3	T1	Beijing, China
	16:00 (UTC+8)						Beijing Smart Esports Center
		K/D/A: 9/15/15; Gold: 61.2K; Turrets: 3 Drakes: 4 Elder Dragons: 0 Barons: 0 Rift Heralds: 1 Voidgrubs: 3	Game 1; 34:21; T1 leads series 1–0			K/D/A: 15/9/3; Gold: 67.7K; Turrets: 8 Drakes: 0 Elder Dragons: 0 Barons: 1 Rift Heralds: 0 Voidgrubs: 0	
		K/D/A: 25/14/70; Gold: 76.1K; Turrets: 10; Drakes: 3 Elder Dragons: 0 Barons: 2 Rift Heralds: 0 Voidgrubs: 2	Game 2; 37:39; Series tied 1–1			K/D/A: 14/25/31; Gold: 62.8K; Turrets: 2 Drakes: 2 Elder Dragons: 0 Barons: 0 Rift Heralds: 1 Voidgrubs: 1	
		K/D/A: 11/27/17; Gold: 60.4K; Turrets: 1 Drakes: 2 Elder Dragons: 0 Barons: 0 Rift Heralds: 0 Voidgrubs: 0	Game 3; 35:26; T1 leads series 2–1			K/D/A: 27/11/66; Gold: 68.8K; Turrets: 7 Drakes: 4 Elder Dragons: 0 Barons: 1 Rift Heralds: 1 Voidgrubs: 3	
		K/D/A: 13/29/27; Gold: 47.6K; Turrets: 3 Drakes: 0 Elder Dragons: 0 Barons: 0 Rift Heralds: 0 Voidgrubs: 2	Game 4; 27:02; T1 wins series 3–1			K/D/A: 29/13/74; Gold: 56.1K; Turrets: 8 Drakes: 3 Elder Dragons: 0 Barons: 0 Rift Heralds: 1 Voidgrubs: 1	

== Swiss stage ==
The Swiss stage was held from 15 to 25 October at the Beijing Smart Esports Center in Beijing, with matches starting at 16:00 CST (UTC+8), with the exception of matches on 15 to 16 October and 25 October, which started at 13:00 CST. Sixteen teams competed in a Swiss-system format over five rounds. Teams that achieved three wins advanced to the knockout stage, while those with three losses were eliminated. In the first two rounds, all games were best-of-ones, while succeeding rounds had all matches as best-of-threes, except for the 1–1 matches.

=== Draw ===
After every round, a draw took place to determine each team's next opponent. For the first round, teams were drawn based on seeding. For succeeding rounds, teams were drawn based on record. The teams were divided into the following tiers for the first Swiss stage draw. In the first round, no two teams from the same region could face each other, while for succeeding rounds, teams cannot rematch against each other but could be paired with a team from the same region.

As T1 won the play-in series against Invictus Gaming, KT Rolster was placed in Tier 2, while Top Esports was assigned in Tier 3.

Tier 1

- Bilibili Gaming
- CTBC Flying Oyster
- FlyQuest
- G2 Esports
- Gen.G

Tier 2

- Anyone's Legend
- Hanwha Life Esports
- Movistar KOI
- Secret Whales
- Vivo Keyd Stars
- KT Rolster

Tier 3

- 100 Thieves
- Fnatic
- PSG Talon
- Top Esports
- T1

=== Bracket ===
Advance to knockouts
2–0	KT Rolster
1–0	CTBC Flying Oyster	1	Anyone's Legend
0–0	Top Esports	1	Anyone's Legend	2	Advance to knockouts
Gen.G	1	100 Thieves	0	KT Rolster	2	2–1	Hanwha Life Esports
PSG Talon	0	Anyone's Legend	1	Top Esports	0	G2 Esports	2	G2 Esports
FlyQuest	0	Gen.G	0	FlyQuest	1	Gen.G
T1	1	KT Rolster	1	1–1	Gen.G	2	Advance to knockouts
G2 Esports	0	Secret Whales	0	G2 Esports	1	Top Esports	0	2–2	CTBC Flying Oyster
Top Esports	1	T1	0	Bilibili Gaming	0	Hanwha Life Esports	2	Top Esports	2	Top Esports
CTBC Flying Oyster	1	CTBC Flying Oyster	1	Gen.G	1	CTBC Flying Oyster	0	Bilibili Gaming	1	T1
Fnatic	0	T1	0	CTBC Flying Oyster	2
Bilibili Gaming	0	0–1	Secret Whales	0	1–2	FlyQuest	0	Eliminated
100 Thieves	1	Bilibili Gaming	1	FlyQuest	1	Bilibili Gaming	2	Movistar KOI	0	Bilibili Gaming
Hanwha Life Esports	0	Fnatic	0	100 Thieves	0	Vivo Keyd Stars	0	T1	2	FlyQuest
Anyone's Legend	1	Movistar KOI	0	Hanwha Life Esports	1	Movistar KOI	2	Movistar KOI
Vivo Keyd Stars	0	G2 Esports	1	Secret Whales	1	Eliminated
Secret Whales	1	PSG Talon	0	0–2	100 Thieves	0	Secret Whales
KT Rolster	1	Hanwha Life Esports	1	Vivo Keyd Stars	2	T1	2	Vivo Keyd Stars
Movistar KOI	0	FlyQuest	1	PSG Talon	1	100 Thieves
Vivo Keyd Stars	0	Movistar KOI	2	Eliminated
Fnatic	1	Fnatic
PSG Talon

Source: LoL Esports

=== Round 1 ===
0–0; Match 2	15 October	Vivo Keyd Stars	0	–	1	Secret Whales	Beijing, China
	13:00 (UTC+8)						Beijing Smart Esports Center
		K/D/A: 8/22/15; Gold: 55.2K; Turrets: 1 Drakes: 1 Elder Dragons: 0 Barons: 0 Rift Heralds: 0 Voidgrubs: 0	33:29; TSW wins 1–0			K/D/A: 22/8/63; Gold: 75.0K; Turrets: 11; Drakes: 4 Elder Dragons: 0 Barons: 2 Rift Heralds: 1 Voidgrubs: 3	

0–0; Match 3	15 October	CTBC Flying Oyster	1	–	0	Fnatic	Beijing, China
	14:00 (UTC+8)						Beijing Smart Esports Center
		K/D/A: 18/5/43; Gold: 62.8K; Turrets: 9 Drakes: 4 Elder Dragons: 0 Barons: 1 Rift Heralds: 1 Voidgrubs: 2	32:00; CFO wins 1–0			K/D/A: 5/18/13; Gold: 52.4K; Turrets: 2 Drakes: 1 Elder Dragons: 0 Barons: 0 Rift Heralds: 0 Voidgrubs: 1	

0–0; Match 4	15 October	KT Rolster	1	–	0	Movistar KOI	Beijing, China
	15:00 (UTC+8)						Beijing Smart Esports Center
		K/D/A: 12/7/36; Gold: 63.8K; Turrets: 9 Drakes: 2 Elder Dragons: 0 Barons: 1 Rift Heralds: 0 Voidgrubs: 3	33:28; KT wins 1–0			K/D/A: 7/12/12; Gold: 55.6K; Turrets: 4 Drakes: 3 Elder Dragons: 0 Barons: 0 Rift Heralds: 1 Voidgrubs: 0	

0–0; Match 5	15 October	Bilibili Gaming	0	–	1	100 Thieves	Beijing, China
	16:00 (UTC+8)						Beijing Smart Esports Center
		K/D/A: 6/22/12; Gold: 52.0K; Turrets: 3 Drakes: 1 Elder Dragons: 0 Barons: 0 Rift Heralds: 1 Voidgrubs: 0	31:10; 100T wins 1–0			K/D/A: 22/6/44; Gold: 61.9K; Turrets: 9 Drakes: 3 Elder Dragons: 0 Barons: 1 Rift Heralds: 0 Voidgrubs: 3	

0–0; Match 6	15 October	FlyQuest	0	–	1	T1	Beijing, China
	17:00 (UTC+8)						Beijing Smart Esports Center
		K/D/A: 12/29/20; Gold: 60.3K; Turrets: 1 Drakes: 1 Elder Dragons: 0 Barons: 0 Rift Heralds: 1 Voidgrubs: 0	34:26; T1 wins 1–0			K/D/A: 29/12/62; Gold: 72.0K; Turrets: 8 Drakes: 3 Elder Dragons: 0 Barons: 2 Rift Heralds: 0 Voidgrubs: 3	

0–0; Match 7	15 October	Hanwha Life Esports	0	–	1	Anyone's Legend	Beijing, China
	18:00 (UTC+8)						Beijing Smart Esports Center
		K/D/A: 14/29/35; Gold: 72.2K; Turrets: 6 Drakes: 2 Elder Dragons: 0 Barons: 1 Rift Heralds: 1 Voidgrubs: 0	41:13; AL wins 1–0			K/D/A: 29/14/74; Gold: 82.6K; Turrets: 8 Drakes: 4 Elder Dragons: 0 Barons: 2 Rift Heralds: 0 Voidgrubs: 3	

0–0; Match 8	15 October	G2 Esports	0	–	1	Top Esports	Beijing, China
	19:00 (UTC+8)						Beijing Smart Esports Center
		K/D/A: 7/22/19; Gold: 55.6K; Turrets: 1 Drakes: 2 Elder Dragons: 0 Barons: 0 Rift Heralds: 0 Voidgrubs: 1	32:25; TES wins 1–0			K/D/A: 22/7/56; Gold: 67.4K; Turrets: 11; Drakes: 2 Elder Dragons: 0 Barons: 1 Rift Heralds: 1 Voidgrubs: 2	

0–0; Match 9	15 October	Gen.G	1	–	0	PSG Talon	Beijing, China
	20:00 (UTC+8)						Beijing Smart Esports Center
		K/D/A: 21/10/48; Gold: 57.4K; Turrets: 8 Drakes: 3 Elder Dragons: 0 Barons: 0 Rift Heralds: 1 Voidgrubs: 3	27:22; GEN wins 1–0			K/D/A: 10/21/20; Gold: 45.1K; Turrets: 0 Drakes: 1 Elder Dragons: 0 Barons: 0 Rift Heralds: 0 Voidgrubs: 0	

=== Round 2 ===
0–1; Match 10	16 October	FlyQuest	1	–	0	Vivo Keyd Stars	Beijing, China
	13:00 (UTC+8)						Beijing Smart Esports Center
		K/D/A: 26/5/63; Gold: 66.9K; Turrets: 9 Drakes: 4 Elder Dragons: 0 Barons: 1 Rift Heralds: 0 Voidgrubs: 3	31:17; FLY wins 1–0			K/D/A: 5/26/12; Gold: 49.9K; Turrets: 1 Drakes: 0 Elder Dragons: 0 Barons: 0 Rift Heralds: 1 Voidgrubs: 0	

1–0; Match 11	16 October	KT Rolster	1	–	0	Secret Whales	Beijing, China
	14:00 (UTC+8)						Beijing Smart Esports Center
		K/D/A: 14/11/39; Gold: 58.1K; Turrets: 9 Drakes: 2 Elder Dragons: 0 Barons: 1 Rift Heralds: 1 Voidgrubs: 3	28:06; KT wins 1–0			K/D/A: 11/14/22; Gold: 49.1K; Turrets: 2 Drakes: 2 Elder Dragons: 0 Barons: 0 Rift Heralds: 0 Voidgrubs: 0	

0–1; Match 12	16 October	Movistar KOI	0	–	1	G2 Esports	Beijing, China
	15:00 (UTC+8)						Beijing Smart Esports Center
		K/D/A: 7/20/11; Gold: 48.1K; Turrets: 3 Drakes: 0 Elder Dragons: 0 Barons: 0 Rift Heralds: 0 Voidgrubs: 3	28:21; G2 wins 1–0			K/D/A: 20/7/42; Gold: 58.7K; Turrets: 10; Drakes: 3 Elder Dragons: 0 Barons: 1 Rift Heralds: 1 Voidgrubs: 0	

1–0; Match 13	16 October	Top Esports	1	–	0	100 Thieves	Beijing, China
	16:00 (UTC+8)						Beijing Smart Esports Center
		K/D/A: 24/9/61; Gold: 61.1K; Turrets: 10; Drakes: 4 Elder Dragons: 0 Barons: 1 Rift Heralds: 1 Voidgrubs: 3	26:19; TES wins 1–0			K/D/A: 9/24/21; Gold: 42.9K; Turrets: 1 Drakes: 0 Elder Dragons: 0 Barons: 0 Rift Heralds: 0 Voidgrubs: 0	

1–0; Match 14	16 October	T1	0	–	1	CTBC Flying Oyster	Beijing, China
	17:00 (UTC+8)						Beijing Smart Esports Center
		K/D/A: 11/25/20; Gold: 53.7K; Turrets: 3 Drakes: 1 Elder Dragons: 0 Barons: 0 Rift Heralds: 0 Voidgrubs: 1	32:22; CFO wins 1–0			K/D/A: 25/11/59; Gold: 68.9K; Turrets: 11; Drakes: 4 Elder Dragons: 0 Barons: 1 Rift Heralds: 1 Voidgrubs: 2	

1–0; Match 15	16 October	Anyone's Legend	1	–	0	Gen.G	Beijing, China
	18:00 (UTC+8)						Beijing Smart Esports Center
		K/D/A: 16/10/40; Gold: 65.2K; Turrets: 8 Drakes: 4 Elder Dragons: 1 Barons: 1 Rift Heralds: 0 Voidgrubs: 0	32:14; AL wins 1–0			K/D/A: 10/16/24; Gold: 56.4K; Turrets: 2 Drakes: 0 Elder Dragons: 0 Barons: 0 Rift Heralds: 1 Voidgrubs: 3	

0–1; Match 16	16 October	Bilibili Gaming	1	–	0	Fnatic	Beijing, China
	19:00 (UTC+8)						Beijing Smart Esports Center
		K/D/A: 14/6/41; Gold: 56.6K; Turrets: 9 Drakes: 2 Elder Dragons: 0 Barons: 1 Rift Heralds: 1 Voidgrubs: 1	27:53; BLG wins 1–0			K/D/A: 6/14/15; Gold: 46.3K; Turrets: 1 Drakes: 2 Elder Dragons: 0 Barons: 0 Rift Heralds: 0 Voidgrubs: 2	

0–1; Match 17	16 October	PSG Talon	0	–	1	Hanwha Life Esports	Beijing, China
	20:00 (UTC+8)						Beijing Smart Esports Center
		K/D/A: 6/16/15; Gold: 45.9K; Turrets: 2 Drakes: 1 Elder Dragons: 0 Barons: 0 Rift Heralds: 0 Voidgrubs: 1	28:07; HLE wins 1–0			K/D/A: 16/6/41; Gold: 54.9K; Turrets: 8 Drakes: 3 Elder Dragons: 0 Barons: 0 Rift Heralds: 1 Voidgrubs: 2	

=== Round 3 ===
All 2–0 and 0–2 matches were best-of-threes, while 1–1 matches continued to be best-of-ones.

2–0; Match 18	17 October	KT Rolster	2	–	0	Top Esports	Beijing, China
	16:00 (UTC+8)						Beijing Smart Esports Center
		K/D/A: 28/10/69; Gold: 67.0K; Turrets: 8 Drakes: 2 Elder Dragons: 0 Barons: 1 Rift Heralds: 1 Voidgrubs: 1	Game 1; 32:59; KT leads series 1–0			K/D/A: 10/28/20; Gold: 55.5K; Turrets: 2 Drakes: 3 Elder Dragons: 0 Barons: 0 Rift Heralds: 0 Voidgrubs: 2	
		K/D/A: 18/7/50; Gold: 59.6K; Turrets: 10; Drakes: 4 Elder Dragons: 0 Barons: 1 Rift Heralds: 1 Voidgrubs: 2	Game 2; 29:19; KT wins series 2–0			K/D/A: 7/18/13; Gold: 52.0K; Turrets: 4 Drakes: 1 Elder Dragons: 0 Barons: 0 Rift Heralds: 0 Voidgrubs: 1	

2–0; Match 19	17 October	CTBC Flying Oyster	1	–	2	Anyone's Legend	Beijing, China
	19:00 (UTC+8)						Beijing Smart Esports Center
		K/D/A: 20/5/57; Gold: 74.1K; Turrets: 8 Drakes: 3 Elder Dragons: 0 Barons: 0 Rift Heralds: 1 Voidgrubs: 3	Game 1; 38:23; CFO leads series 1–0			K/D/A: 5/20/10; Gold: 65.1K; Turrets: 2 Drakes: 2 Elder Dragons: 0 Barons: 1 Rift Heralds: 0 Voidgrubs: 0	
		K/D/A: 11/18/30; Gold: 53.6K; Turrets: 3 Drakes: 2 Elder Dragons: 0 Barons: 0 Rift Heralds: 0 Voidgrubs: 1	Game 2; 30:09; Series tied 1–1			K/D/A: 18/11/53; Gold: 61.0K; Turrets: 9 Drakes: 2 Elder Dragons: 0 Barons: 1 Rift Heralds: 1 Voidgrubs: 2	
		K/D/A: 7/15/23; Gold: 50.9K; Turrets: 4 Drakes: 1 Elder Dragons: 0 Barons: 0 Rift Heralds: 1 Voidgrubs: 1	Game 3; 29:19; AL wins series 2–1			K/D/A: 15/7/44; Gold: 56.5K; Turrets: 7 Drakes: 4 Elder Dragons: 0 Barons: 0 Rift Heralds: 0 Voidgrubs: 2	

1–1; Match 20	18 October	Secret Whales	0	–	1	FlyQuest	Beijing, China
	16:00 (UTC+8)						Beijing Smart Esports Center
		K/D/A: 7/18/23; Gold: 53.7K; Turrets: 1 Drakes: 2 Elder Dragons: 0 Barons: 0 Rift Heralds: 1 Voidgrubs: 3	32:17; FLY wins 1–0			K/D/A: 18/7/42; Gold: 64.8K; Turrets: 8 Drakes: 3 Elder Dragons: 0 Barons: 1 Rift Heralds: 0 Voidgrubs: 0	

1–1; Match 21	18 October	Gen.G	1	–	0	T1	Beijing, China
	17:00 (UTC+8)						Beijing Smart Esports Center
		K/D/A: 23/3/71; Gold: 58.8K; Turrets: 9 Drakes: 3 Elder Dragons: 0 Barons: 1 Rift Heralds: 1 Voidgrubs: 3	27:43; GEN wins 1–0			K/D/A: 3/23/8; Gold: 42.8K; Turrets: 1 Drakes: 1 Elder Dragons: 0 Barons: 0 Rift Heralds: 0 Voidgrubs: 0	

1–1; Match 22	18 October	G2 Esports	1	–	0	Bilibili Gaming	Beijing, China
	18:00 (UTC+8)						Beijing Smart Esports Center
		K/D/A: 15/9/40; Gold: 54.1K; Turrets: 7 Drakes: 4 Elder Dragons: 0 Barons: 1 Rift Heralds: 1 Voidgrubs: 0	28:03; G2 wins 1–0			K/D/A: 9/15/23; Gold: 48.7K; Turrets: 4 Drakes: 0 Elder Dragons: 0 Barons: 0 Rift Heralds: 0 Voidgrubs: 3	

1–1; Match 23	18 October	100 Thieves	0	–	1	Hanwha Life Esports	Beijing, China
	19:00 (UTC+8)						Beijing Smart Esports Center
		K/D/A: 4/26/8; Gold: 37.9K; Turrets: 0 Drakes: 0 Elder Dragons: 0 Barons: 0 Rift Heralds: 0 Voidgrubs: 0	24:50; HLE wins 1–0			K/D/A: 26/4/67; Gold: 51.5K; Turrets: 9 Drakes: 4 Elder Dragons: 0 Barons: 0 Rift Heralds: 1 Voidgrubs: 3	

0–2; Match 24	19 October	Movistar KOI	2	–	1	Fnatic	Beijing, China
	16:00 (UTC+8)						Beijing Smart Esports Center
		K/D/A: 27/7/67; Gold: 62.2K; Turrets: 10; Drakes: 4 Elder Dragons: 0 Barons: 1 Rift Heralds: 0 Voidgrubs: 3	Game 1; 27:00; MKOI leads series 1–0			K/D/A: 7/24/12; Gold: 42.9K; Turrets: 1 Drakes: 0 Elder Dragons: 0 Barons: 0 Rift Heralds: 1 Voidgrubs: 0	
		K/D/A: 3/21/10; Gold: 41.9K; Turrets: 1 Drakes: 0 Elder Dragons: 0 Barons: 0 Rift Heralds: 1 Voidgrubs: 1	Game 2; 26:46; Series tied 1–1			K/D/A: 21/3/51; Gold: 57.0K; Turrets: 8 Drakes: 4 Elder Dragons: 0 Barons: 1 Rift Heralds: 0 Voidgrubs: 2	
		K/D/A: 24/5/63; Gold: 60.4K; Turrets: 9 Drakes: 3 Elder Dragons: 0 Barons: 1 Rift Heralds: 1 Voidgrubs: 3	Game 3; 28:58; MKOI wins series 2–1			K/D/A: 5/24/10; Gold: 45.7K; Turrets: 1 Drakes: 1 Elder Dragons: 0 Barons: 0 Rift Heralds: 0 Voidgrubs: 0	

0–2; Match 25	19 October	Vivo Keyd Stars	2	–	1	PSG Talon	Beijing, China
	19:00 (UTC+8)						Beijing Smart Esports Center
		K/D/A: 26/3/68; Gold: 54.8K; Turrets: 9 Drakes: 3 Elder Dragons: 0 Barons: 0 Rift Heralds: 1 Voidgrubs: 0	Game 1; 25:33; VKS leads series 1–0			K/D/A: 3/26/6; Gold: 39.4K; Turrets: 1 Drakes: 0 Elder Dragons: 0 Barons: 0 Rift Heralds: 0 Voidgrubs: 3	
		K/D/A: 11/25/27; Gold: 55.0K; Turrets: 2 Drakes: 1 Elder Dragons: 0 Barons: 0 Rift Heralds: 0 Voidgrubs: 1	Game 2; 34:18; Series tied 1–1			K/D/A: 25/11/65; Gold: 68.5K; Turrets: 8 Drakes: 4 Elder Dragons: 0 Barons: 1 Rift Heralds: 1 Voidgrubs: 2	
		K/D/A: 28/13/65; Gold: 69.1K; Turrets: 8 Drakes: 2 Elder Dragons: 0 Barons: 0 Rift Heralds: 1 Voidgrubs: 1	Game 3; 34:33; VKS wins series 2–1			K/D/A: 13/28/30; Gold: 57.8K; Turrets: 0 Drakes: 2 Elder Dragons: 0 Barons: 0 Rift Heralds: 0 Voidgrubs: 2	

=== Round 4 ===
2–1; Match 26	22 October	Hanwha Life Esports	2	–	0	CTBC Flying Oyster	Beijing, China
	16:00 (UTC+8)						Beijing Smart Esports Center
		K/D/A: 21/14/50; Gold: 61.0K; Turrets: 7 Drakes: 2 Elder Dragons: 0 Barons: 1 Rift Heralds: 0 Voidgrubs: 3	Game 1; 31:22; HLE leads series 1–0			K/D/A: 14/21/35; Gold: 53.8K; Turrets: 3 Drakes: 3 Elder Dragons: 0 Barons: 0 Rift Heralds: 1 Voidgrubs: 0	
		K/D/A: 15/13/41; Gold: 67.2K; Turrets: 9 Drakes: 2 Elder Dragons: 0 Barons: 1 Rift Heralds: 0 Voidgrubs: 1	Game 2; 34:41; HLE wins series 2–0			K/D/A: 12/15/25; Gold: 58.2K; Turrets: 3 Drakes: 3 Elder Dragons: 0 Barons: 0 Rift Heralds: 1 Voidgrubs: 2	

2–1; Match 27	22 October	G2 Esports	2	–	1	FlyQuest	Beijing, China
	19:00 (UTC+8)						Beijing Smart Esports Center
		K/D/A: 4/11/7; Gold: 59.3K; Turrets: 1 Drakes: 3 Elder Dragons: 0 Barons: 0 Rift Heralds: 0 Voidgrubs: 0	Game 1; 38:07; FLY leads series 1–0			K/D/A: 11/4/25; Gold: 70.0K; Turrets: 8 Drakes: 2 Elder Dragons: 0 Barons: 1 Rift Heralds: 1 Voidgrubs: 3	
		K/D/A: 15/3/44; Gold: 60.9K; Turrets: 9 Drakes: 4 Elder Dragons: 0 Barons: 1 Rift Heralds: 0 Voidgrubs: 3	Game 2; 31:33; Series tied 1–1			K/D/A: 3/15/5; Gold: 48.4K; Turrets: 2 Drakes: 1 Elder Dragons: 0 Barons: 0 Rift Heralds: 1 Voidgrubs: 0	
		K/D/A: 20/12/51; Gold: 66.0K; Turrets: 9 Drakes: 3 Elder Dragons: 0 Barons: 0 Rift Heralds: 1 Voidgrubs: 1	Game 3; 34:43; G2 wins series 2–1			K/D/A: 12/20/31; Gold: 62.6K; Turrets: 2 Drakes: 2 Elder Dragons: 0 Barons: 2 Rift Heralds: 0 Voidgrubs: 2	

1–2; Match 28	23 October	Movistar KOI	2	–	1	Secret Whales	Beijing, China
	16:00 (UTC+8)						Beijing Smart Esports Center
		K/D/A: 11/22/22; Gold: 58.1K; Turrets: 1 Drakes: 1 Elder Dragons: 0 Barons: 0 Rift Heralds: 1 Voidgrubs: 1	Game 1; 34:35; TSW leads series 1–0			K/D/A: 22/11/58; Gold: 68.5K; Turrets: 9 Drakes: 4 Elder Dragons: 0 Barons: 1 Rift Heralds: 0 Voidgrubs: 2	
		K/D/A: 17/9/43; Gold: 72.4K; Turrets: 11; Drakes: 2 Elder Dragons: 0 Barons: 2 Rift Heralds: 0 Voidgrubs: 0	Game 2; 35:16; Series tied 1–1			K/D/A: 9/17/10; Gold: 64.3K; Turrets: 6 Drakes: 2 Elder Dragons: 0 Barons: 0 Rift Heralds: 1 Voidgrubs: 3	
		K/D/A: 24/7/51; Gold: 63.2K; Turrets: 10; Drakes: 4 Elder Dragons: 0 Barons: 1 Rift Heralds: 0 Voidgrubs: 0	Game 3; 34:43; MKOI wins series 2–1			K/D/A: 7/25/13; Gold: 47.5K; Turrets: 2 Drakes: 1 Elder Dragons: 0 Barons: 0 Rift Heralds: 1 Voidgrubs: 3	

2–1; Match 29	23 October	Gen.G	2	–	0	Top Esports	Beijing, China
	19:00 (UTC+8)						Beijing Smart Esports Center
		K/D/A: 21/6/51; Gold: 54.2K; Turrets: 9 Drakes: 3 Elder Dragons: 0 Barons: 0 Rift Heralds: 1 Voidgrubs: 2	Game 1; 24:55; GEN leads series 1–0			K/D/A: 5/21/9; Gold: 39.4K; Turrets: 0 Drakes: 1 Elder Dragons: 0 Barons: 0 Rift Heralds: 0 Voidgrubs: 1	
		K/D/A: 23/10/74; Gold: 60.7K; Turrets: 7 Drakes: 3 Elder Dragons: 0 Barons: 1 Rift Heralds: 0 Voidgrubs: 2	Game 2; 29:27; GEN wins series 2–0			K/D/A: 10/23/27; Gold: 50.4K; Turrets: 3 Drakes: 0 Elder Dragons: 0 Barons: 0 Rift Heralds: 1 Voidgrubs: 1	

1–2; Match 30	24 October	Bilibili Gaming	2	–	0	Vivo Keyd Stars	Beijing, China
	16:00 (UTC+8)						Beijing Smart Esports Center
		K/D/A: 18/6/33; Gold: 62.4K; Turrets: 11; Drakes: 3 Elder Dragons: 0 Barons: 1 Rift Heralds: 1 Voidgrubs: 0	Game 1; 29:54; BLG leads series 1–0			K/D/A: 6/18/6; Gold: 47.6K; Turrets: 0 Drakes: 1 Elder Dragons: 0 Barons: 0 Rift Heralds: 0 Voidgrubs: 3	
		K/D/A: 21/20/41; Gold: 83.8K; Turrets: 9 Drakes: 3 Elder Dragons: 0 Barons: 2 Rift Heralds: 1 Voidgrubs: 1	Game 2; 43:51; BLG wins series 2–0			K/D/A: 20/21/49; Gold: 78.2K; Turrets: 5 Drakes: 2 Elder Dragons: 0 Barons: 0 Rift Heralds: 0 Voidgrubs: 2	

1–2; Match 31	24 October	100 Thieves	0	–	2	T1	Beijing, China
	19:00 (UTC+8)						Beijing Smart Esports Center
		K/D/A: 16/24/31; Gold: 72.2K; Turrets: 4 Drakes: 2 Elder Dragons: 0 Barons: 1 Rift Heralds: 1 Voidgrubs: 2	Game 1; 41:34; T1 leads series 1–0			K/D/A: 24/16/57; Gold: 82.4K; Turrets: 10; Drakes: 4 Elder Dragons: 0 Barons: 1 Rift Heralds: 0 Voidgrubs: 1	
		K/D/A: 12/17/24; Gold: 50.6K; Turrets: 0 Drakes: 1 Elder Dragons: 0 Barons: 0 Rift Heralds: 1 Voidgrubs: 0	Game 2; 30:01; T1 wins series 2–0			K/D/A: 17/12/46; Gold: 60.4K; Turrets: 10; Drakes: 4 Elder Dragons: 0 Barons: 1 Rift Heralds: 0 Voidgrubs: 3	

=== Round 5 ===
2–2; Match 32	25 October	CTBC Flying Oyster	2	–	0	FlyQuest	Beijing, China
	13:00 (UTC+8)						Beijing Smart Esports Center
		K/D/A: 21/14/60; Gold: 86.8K; Turrets: 10; Drakes: 4 Elder Dragons: 0 Barons: 2 Rift Heralds: 0 Voidgrubs: 3	Game 1; 45:07; CFO leads series 1–0			K/D/A: 14/21/37; Gold: 78.3K; Turrets: 3 Drakes: 3 Elder Dragons: 0 Barons: 1 Rift Heralds: 1 Voidgrubs: 0	
		K/D/A: 15/5/31; Gold: 56.6K; Turrets: 9 Drakes: 2 Elder Dragons: 0 Barons: 0 Rift Heralds: 0 Voidgrubs: 0	Game 2; 27:10; CFO wins series 2–0			K/D/A: 5/15/7; Gold: 43.8K; Turrets: 2 Drakes: 1 Elder Dragons: 0 Barons: 0 Rift Heralds: 1 Voidgrubs: 3	

2–2; Match 33	25 October	Top Esports	2	–	1	Bilibili Gaming	Beijing, China
	16:00 (UTC+8)						Beijing Smart Esports Center
		K/D/A: 10/21/23; Gold: 49.5K; Turrets: 2 Drakes: 0 Elder Dragons: 0 Barons: 0 Rift Heralds: 0 Voidgrubs: 3	Game 1; 28:19; BLG leads series 1–0			K/D/A: 21/10/54; Gold: 60.5K; Turrets: 11; Drakes: 4 Elder Dragons: 0 Barons: 1 Rift Heralds: 1 Voidgrubs: 0	
		K/D/A: 16/6/33; Gold: 56.5K; Turrets: 7 Drakes: 4 Elder Dragons: 0 Barons: 1 Rift Heralds: 0 Voidgrubs: 3	Game 2; 28:36; Series tied 1–1			K/D/A: 6/16/12; Gold: 48.6K; Turrets: 3 Drakes: 0 Elder Dragons: 0 Barons: 0 Rift Heralds: 1 Voidgrubs: 0	
		K/D/A: 22/25/57; Gold: 72.5K; Turrets: 9 Drakes: 4 Elder Dragons: 0 Barons: 1 Rift Heralds: 0 Voidgrubs: 2	Game 3; 27:10; TES wins series 2–1			K/D/A: 25/22/65; Gold: 66.0K; Turrets: 4 Drakes: 2 Elder Dragons: 0 Barons: 0 Rift Heralds: 1 Voidgrubs: 1	

2–2; Match 34	25 October	Movistar KOI	0	–	2	T1	Beijing, China
	19:00 (UTC+8)						Beijing Smart Esports Center
		K/D/A: 10/18/20; Gold: 57.3K; Turrets: 4 Drakes: 1 Elder Dragons: 0 Barons: 0 Rift Heralds: 0 Voidgrubs: 3	Game 1; 32:54; T1 leads series 1–0			K/D/A: 18/10/44; Gold: 69.8K; Turrets: 11; Drakes: 4 Elder Dragons: 0 Barons: 1 Rift Heralds: 1 Voidgrubs: 0	
		K/D/A: 18/19/47; Gold: 69.9K; Turrets: 1 Drakes: 2 Elder Dragons: 0 Barons: 0 Rift Heralds: 0 Voidgrubs: 3	Game 2; 41:19; T1 wins series 2–0			K/D/A: 19/18/47; Gold: 78.8K; Turrets: 9 Drakes: 4 Elder Dragons: 1 Barons: 2 Rift Heralds: 1 Voidgrubs: 0	

== Knockout stage ==
The knockout stage took place from 28 October to 2 November for the quarterfinals and semifinals. Unlike previous World Championship knockout stages, the two stages were held consecutively as opposed to having a week-long break in between each. Both stages were held at the Mercedes-Benz Arena in Shanghai. After the conclusion of the Swiss stage, a draw was conducted to determine the quarterfinal matches, where two teams that finished the Swiss stage with a 3–0 record were placed on opposite sides of the bracket and faced teams with a 3–2 record in the quarterfinals, while all remaining teams were seeded randomly.

Chengdu staged the finals on 9 November at the Dong'an Lake Sports Park Multifunctional Gymnasium. All matches in the knockout stage were contested in best-of-fives, with each match beginning at 15:00 CST (UTC+8).

=== Qualified teams ===
CTBC Flying Oyster's qualification marked the first knockout stage appearance for both the team and the League of Legends Championship Pacific (LCP), as well as the first from the Asia-Pacific region since 2015, when both Flash Wolves and ahq eSports Club of what was then known as the League of Legends Master Series (LMS) qualified for the knockout stage of that year's edition of the World Championship. It was also the first appearance of the League of Legends EMEA Championship (LEC) since 2022 and G2 Esports's first knockout stage since the 2020 edition, also held in China. Anyone's Legend of the LPL also made their knockout stage debut in their first World Championship appearance.

Eight teams qualified for the playoff portion of the tournament from the Swiss stage.

Pools	Teams
Pool 1 (3–0)	KT Rolster
Pool 1 (3–0)	Anyone's Legend
Pool 2 (3–1)	Hanwha Life Esports
Pool 2 (3–1)	G2 Esports
Pool 2 (3–1)	Gen.G
Pool 3 (3–2)	CTBC Flying Oyster
Pool 3 (3–2)	Top Esports
Pool 3 (3–2)	T1

=== Bracket ===
Quarterfinals
28 October, 15:00 CST – Shanghai
Gen.G	3
Hanwha Life Esports	1
29 October, 15:00 CST – Shanghai
KT Rolster	3
CTBC Flying Oyster	0
30 October, 15:00 CST – Shanghai
G2 Esports	1
Top Esports	3
31 October, 15:00 CST – Shanghai
Anyone's Legend	2
T1	3

Semifinals
1 November, 15:00 CST – Shanghai
Gen.G	1
KT Rolster	3
2 November, 15:00 CST – Shanghai
Top Esports	0
T1	3

Final
9 November, 15:00 CST – Chengdu
KT Rolster	2
T1	3

Source: LoL Esports

=== Quarterfinals ===
Match 35	28 October	Gen.G	3	–	1	Hanwha Life Esports	Shanghai, China
	15:00 (UTC+8)						Mercedes-Benz Arena
		K/D/A: 20/15/50; Gold: 64.7K; Turrets: 8 Drakes: 2 Elder Dragons: 0 Barons: 0 Rift Heralds: 1 Voidgrubs: 1	Game 1; 33:28; GEN leads series 1–0			K/D/A: 15/20/43; Gold: 60.9K; Turrets: 5 Drakes: 2 Elder Dragons: 0 Barons: 1 Rift Heralds: 0 Voidgrubs: 2	
		K/D/A: 29/22/79; Gold: 112.5K; Turrets: 10; Drakes: 3 Elder Dragons: 1 Barons: 3 Rift Heralds: 0 Voidgrubs: 1	Game 2; 58:51; GEN leads series 2–0			K/D/A: 22/29/44; Gold: 103.9K; Turrets: 7 Drakes: 4 Elder Dragons: 0 Barons: 1 Rift Heralds: 1 Voidgrubs: 2	
		K/D/A: 6/22/14; Gold: 53.0K; Turrets: 2 Drakes: 1 Elder Dragons: 0 Barons: 0 Rift Heralds: 1 Voidgrubs: 2	Game 3; 31:44; GEN leads series 2–1			K/D/A: 22/6/60; Gold: 67.6K; Turrets: 11; Drakes: 4 Elder Dragons: 0 Barons: 1 Rift Heralds: 0 Voidgrubs: 1	
		K/D/A: 19/6/56; Gold: 66.0K; Turrets: 10; Drakes: 4 Elder Dragons: 0 Barons: 1 Rift Heralds: 0 Voidgrubs: 3	Game 4; 31:58; GEN wins series 3–1			K/D/A: 6/19/16; Gold: 55.0K; Turrets: 3 Drakes: 0 Elder Dragons: 0 Barons: 0 Rift Heralds: 1 Voidgrubs: 0	

Match 36	29 October	KT Rolster	3	–	0	CTBC Flying Oyster	Shanghai, China
	15:00 (UTC+8)						Mercedes-Benz Arena
		K/D/A: 26/16/65; Gold: 68.7K; Turrets: 10; Drakes: 4 Elder Dragons: 0 Barons: 1 Rift Heralds: 1 Voidgrubs: 2	Game 1; 32:50; KT leads series 1–0			K/D/A: 12/26/29; Gold: 57.0K; Turrets: 1 Drakes: 1 Elder Dragons: 0 Barons: 0 Rift Heralds: 0 Voidgrubs: 1	
		K/D/A: 21/4/67; Gold: 50.6K; Turrets: 8 Drakes: 3 Elder Dragons: 0 Barons: 0 Rift Heralds: 1 Voidgrubs: 3	Game 2; 24:32; KT leads series 2–0			K/D/A: 4/21/11; Gold: 38.7K; Turrets: 1 Drakes: 0 Elder Dragons: 0 Barons: 0 Rift Heralds: 0 Voidgrubs: 0	
		K/D/A: 23/12/59; Gold: 59.9K; Turrets: 8 Drakes: 4 Elder Dragons: 0 Barons: 1 Rift Heralds: 0 Voidgrubs: 3	Game 3; 29:19; KT wins series 3–0			K/D/A: 12/23/28; Gold: 50.3K; Turrets: 4 Drakes: 1 Elder Dragons: 0 Barons: 0 Rift Heralds: 1 Voidgrubs: 0	

Match 37	30 October	G2 Esports	1	–	3	Top Esports	Shanghai, China
	15:00 (UTC+8)						Mercedes-Benz Arena
		K/D/A: 6/23/19; Gold: 48.1K; Turrets: 0 Drakes: 1 Elder Dragons: 0 Barons: 0 Rift Heralds: 0 Voidgrubs: 1	Game 1; 30:29; TES leads series 1–0			K/D/A: 23/6/59; Gold: 61.5K; Turrets: 8 Drakes: 3 Elder Dragons: 0 Barons: 1 Rift Heralds: 1 Voidgrubs: 2	
		K/D/A: 23/11/55; Gold: 66.2K; Turrets: 10; Drakes: 3 Elder Dragons: 0 Barons: 1 Rift Heralds: 0 Voidgrubs: 3	Game 2; 32:23; Series tied 1–1			K/D/A: 11/23/22; Gold: 56.0K; Turrets: 2 Drakes: 2 Elder Dragons: 0 Barons: 0 Rift Heralds: 1 Voidgrubs: 0	
		K/D/A: 4/14/8; Gold: 47.8K; Turrets: 3 Drakes: 0 Elder Dragons: 0 Barons: 0 Rift Heralds: 1 Voidgrubs: 3	Game 3; 29:17; TES leads series 2–1			K/D/A: 14/4/37; Gold: 55.7K; Turrets: 7 Drakes: 4 Elder Dragons: 0 Barons: 1 Rift Heralds: 0 Voidgrubs: 0	
		K/D/A: 5/17/10; Gold: 48.4K; Turrets: 3 Drakes: 1 Elder Dragons: 0 Barons: 0 Rift Heralds: 1 Voidgrubs: 3	Game 4; 29:24; TES wins series 3–1			K/D/A: 17/5/34; Gold: 59.6K; Turrets: 9 Drakes: 2 Elder Dragons: 0 Barons: 1 Rift Heralds: 0 Voidgrubs: 0	

Match 38	31 October	Anyone's Legend	2	–	3	T1	Shanghai, China
	15:00 (UTC+8)						Mercedes-Benz Arena
		K/D/A: 5/18/13; Gold: 63.7K; Turrets: 4 Drakes: 0 Elder Dragons: 0 Barons: 0 Rift Heralds: 1 Voidgrubs: 3	Game 1; 36:01; T1 leads series 1–0			K/D/A: 18/5/58; Gold: 73.3K; Turrets: 9 Drakes: 4 Elder Dragons: 1 Barons: 1 Rift Heralds: 0 Voidgrubs: 0	
		K/D/A: 22/10/55; Gold: 65.2K; Turrets: 10; Drakes: 3 Elder Dragons: 0 Barons: 1 Rift Heralds: 1 Voidgrubs: 0	Game 2; 31:32; Series tied 1–1			K/D/A: 10/22/26; Gold: 54.7K; Turrets: 3 Drakes: 2 Elder Dragons: 0 Barons: 0 Rift Heralds: 0 Voidgrubs: 3	
		K/D/A: 19/11/59; Gold: 72.9K; Turrets: 6 Drakes: 4 Elder Dragons: 1 Barons: 1 Rift Heralds: 1 Voidgrubs: 3	Game 3; 38:07; AL leads series 2–1			K/D/A: 11/19/26; Gold: 65.2K; Turrets: 5 Drakes: 1 Elder Dragons: 0 Barons: 0 Rift Heralds: 0 Voidgrubs: 0	
		K/D/A: 13/24/30; Gold: 61.1K; Turrets: 2 Drakes: 1 Elder Dragons: 0 Barons: 0 Rift Heralds: 0 Voidgrubs: 1	Game 4; 36:31; Series tied 2–2			K/D/A: 24/13/69; Gold: 72.6K; Turrets: 9 Drakes: 4 Elder Dragons: 0 Barons: 1 Rift Heralds: 1 Voidgrubs: 2	
		K/D/A: 17/10/49; Gold: 59.6K; Turrets: 3 Drakes: 0 Elder Dragons: 0 Barons: 0 Rift Heralds: 0 Voidgrubs: 0	Game 5; 35:14; T1 wins series 3–2			K/D/A: 10/17/27; Gold: 62.8K; Turrets: 9 Drakes: 4 Elder Dragons: 1 Barons: 1 Rift Heralds: 1 Voidgrubs: 3	

=== Semifinals ===
Match 39	1 November	Gen.G	1	–	3	KT Rolster	Shanghai, China
	15:00 (UTC+8)						Mercedes-Benz Arena
		K/D/A: 19/18/47; Gold: 82.2K; Turrets: 7 Drakes: 2 Elder Dragons: 0 Barons: 2 Rift Heralds: 1 Voidgrubs: 2	Game 1; 46:45; KT leads series 1–0			K/D/A: 18/19/52; Gold: 86.4K; Turrets: 10; Drakes: 4 Elder Dragons: 1 Barons: 1 Rift Heralds: 0 Voidgrubs: 1	
		K/D/A: 25/15/60; Gold: 81.2K; Turrets: 11; Drakes: 4 Elder Dragons: 0 Barons: 2 Rift Heralds: 1 Voidgrubs: 3	Game 2; 39:07; Series tied 1–1			K/D/A: 15/25/35; Gold: 69.8K; Turrets: 3 Drakes: 2 Elder Dragons: 0 Barons: 0 Rift Heralds: 0 Voidgrubs: 0	
		K/D/A: 2/17/2; Gold: 43.4K; Turrets: 1 Drakes: 0 Elder Dragons: 0 Barons: 0 Rift Heralds: 0 Voidgrubs: 2	Game 3; 29:00; KT leads series 2–1			K/D/A: 17/2/38; Gold: 58.6K; Turrets: 10; Drakes: 4 Elder Dragons: 0 Barons: 1 Rift Heralds: 1 Voidgrubs: 1	
		K/D/A: 2/16/3; Gold: 56.0K; Turrets: 3 Drakes: 1 Elder Dragons: 0 Barons: 0 Rift Heralds: 0 Voidgrubs: 2	Game 4; 35:08; KT wins series 3–1			K/D/A: 16/2/49; Gold: 66.8K; Turrets: 8 Drakes: 4 Elder Dragons: 1 Barons: 1 Rift Heralds: 1 Voidgrubs: 1	

Match 40	2 November	Top Esports	0	–	3	T1	Shanghai, China
	15:00 (UTC+8)						Mercedes-Benz Arena
		K/D/A: 4/11/5; Gold: 49.7K; Turrets: 3 Drakes: 0 Elder Dragons: 0 Barons: 0 Rift Heralds: 0 Voidgrubs: 3	Game 1; 30:12; T1 leads series 1–0			K/D/A: 11/4/25; Gold: 58.0K; Turrets: 7 Drakes: 4 Elder Dragons: 0 Barons: 1 Rift Heralds: 1 Voidgrubs: 0	
		K/D/A: 8/25/16; Gold: 46.3K; Turrets: 3 Drakes: 1 Elder Dragons: 0 Barons: 0 Rift Heralds: 1 Voidgrubs: 3	Game 2; 27:10; T1 leads series 2–0			K/D/A: 25/8/68; Gold: 58.8K; Turrets: 7 Drakes: 3 Elder Dragons: 0 Barons: 1 Rift Heralds: 0 Voidgrubs: 0	
		K/D/A: 15/34/28; Gold: 51.6K; Turrets: 1 Drakes: 0 Elder Dragons: 0 Barons: 0 Rift Heralds: 1 Voidgrubs: 3	Game 3; 28:55; T1 wins series 3–0			K/D/A: 34/15/79; Gold: 61.8K; Turrets: 8 Drakes: 4 Elder Dragons: 0 Barons: 1 Rift Heralds: 0 Voidgrubs: 0	

=== Final ===
Match 41	9 November	KT Rolster	2	–	3	T1	Chengdu, China
	15:00 (UTC+8)						Dong'an Lake Sports Park Multifunctional Gymnasium
		K/D/A: 11/25/19; Gold: 61.3K; Turrets: 2 Drakes: 2 Elder Dragons: 0 Barons: 0 Rift Heralds: 1 Voidgrubs: 3	Game 1; 36:09; T1 leads series 1–0			K/D/A: 25/11/70; Gold: 75.2K; Turrets: 9 Drakes: 3 Elder Dragons: 0 Barons: 2 Rift Heralds: 0 Voidgrubs: 0	
		K/D/A: 24/15/56; Gold: 88.5K; Turrets: 12; Drakes: 4 Elder Dragons: 0 Barons: 2 Rift Heralds: 1 Voidgrubs: 3	Game 2; 42:32; Series tied 1–1			K/D/A: 15/24/36; Gold: 76.4K; Turrets: 3 Drakes: 2 Elder Dragons: 0 Barons: 0 Rift Heralds: 0 Voidgrubs: 0	
		K/D/A: 23/9/56; Gold: 70.9K; Turrets: 8 Drakes: 4 Elder Dragons: 0 Barons: 1 Rift Heralds: 0 Voidgrubs: 0	Game 3; 36:51; KT leads series 2–1			K/D/A: 9/23/20; Gold: 64.9K; Turrets: 5 Drakes: 2 Elder Dragons: 0 Barons: 0 Rift Heralds: 1 Voidgrubs: 3	
		K/D/A: 8/17/22; Gold: 43.8K; Turrets: 0 Drakes: 0 Elder Dragons: 0 Barons: 0 Rift Heralds: 0 Voidgrubs: 0	Game 4; 29:40; Series tied 2–2			K/D/A: 17/8/47; Gold: 58.9K; Turrets: 10; Drakes: 4 Elder Dragons: 0 Barons: 1 Rift Heralds: 1 Voidgrubs: 3	
		K/D/A: 11/23/30; Gold: 61.2K; Turrets: 1 Drakes: 2 Elder Dragons: 0 Barons: 0 Rift Heralds: 1 Voidgrubs: 1	Game 5; 36:47; T1 wins series 3–2			K/D/A: 23/11/55; Gold: 74.6K; Turrets: 10; Drakes: 4 Elder Dragons: 0 Barons: 1 Rift Heralds: 0 Voidgrubs: 2	

== Final standings ==
A base prize pool of US$5,000,000 is offered for the tournament.

Place	Team	PI	SS	QF	SF	Finals	Prize (%)	Prize (USD)
1st	T1	3–1	3–2	3–2	3–0	3–2	20%	$1,000,000
2nd	KT Rolster	–	3–0	3–0	3–1	2–3	16%	$800,000
3rd–4th	Gen.G	–	3–1	3–1	1–3		8%	$400,000
3rd–4th	Top Esports	–	3–2	3–1	0–3		8%	$400,000
5th–8th	Anyone's Legend	–	3–0	2–3			6%	$300,000
5th–8th	Hanwha Life Esports	–	3–1	1–3			6%	$300,000
5th–8th	G2 Esports	–	3–1	1–3			6%	$300,000
5th–8th	CTBC Flying Oyster	–	3–2	0–3			6%	$300,000
9th–11th	Bilibili Gaming	–	2–3				3.5%	$175,000
9th–11th	FlyQuest	–	2–3				3.5%	$175,000
9th–11th	Movistar KOI	–	2–3				3.5%	$175,000
12th–14th	Secret Whales	–	1–3				2.5%	$125,000
12th–14th	100 Thieves	–	1–3				2.5%	$125,000
12th–14th	Vivo Keyd Stars	–	1–3				2.5%	$125,000
15th–16th	Fnatic	–	0–3				2.25%	$112,500
15th–16th	PSG Talon	–	0–3				2.25%	$112,500
17th	Invictus Gaming	1–3					1.5%	$75,000

== Marketing ==
=== Official song ===
In its 11 August 2025 development update, Riot Games announced that the official anthem of the World Championship would be released on 10 October, four days before the start of the tournament. On 19 September, it was revealed that Chinese and Hong Kong singer-songwriter G.E.M. would be the singer of the song, and is expected to perform during the tournament final on 9 November. On 8 October, Riot announced that the anthem, later entitled "Sacrifice", would be delayed three days to 13 October, owing to cutting out FlyQuest's top laner Gabriël "Bwipo" Rau. Bwipo's removal came after he commented on a September livestream that female pros should not be playing competitively during menstruation. Riot said that Bwipo was planned to be the only player from the LTA region present in the Worlds anthem's video, and his removal from it was not related to his one-series suspension from FlyQuest during the LTA playoffs. It would turn out that the Americas region was still represented in the video, with a shot of retired professional player Marcus "Dyrus" Hill of the United States, who played in the then-North American LCS (now known as the League Championship Series) for Team SoloMid from 2012 to 2015 and in four editions of the World Championship from 2011 to 2015.

"Sacrifice" by G.E.M was released on 13 October 2025, alongside a music video featuring players, personalities, and moments from previous World Championship editions as a tribute to the 15th year anniversary of League of Legends esports. The video also most notably features 2011 World Champion and Finals MVP, Maciej "Shushei" Ratuszniak, who died of cancer in April 2025.

==== Orchestral theme ====
As with every World Championship since 2012, an orchestral theme was released for the tournament. The 2025 Orchestral theme was released on 2 October 2025, composed and arranged by Riot Games composers Alexander Temple and J.D. Spears. It was recorded at the Sony Pictures Scoring Stage in Los Angeles, United States.

=== Slogan ===
The tournament's official slogan is "Earn Your Legacy" (Chinese: 争者留其名; pinyin: Zhēng Zhě Liú Qí Míng). It was unveiled internationally on 30 September 2025, coinciding with the release of the tournament primer. However, it had been released domestically in China prior to the said date.

== Sponsorship ==
Global Partners	Local Partners
Amazon Web Services; Cisco; Coinbase; Crunchyroll; Esports World Cup; HyperX; Mastercard; Mercedes-Benz; HP Omen; Opera GX; Oppo; Red Bull; Secretlab; Verizon; Globant	Bright Food (Guangming Mosilian); Durex China; JD.com; Cotti Coffee; Rio; Li-Ning; Intel China; ZIWI
