= Sacrifice (G.E.M. song) =

Single by G.E.M.
- Released: October 13, 2025
- Studio: Riot Games Music
- Length: 4:09
- Label: Riot Games
- Songwriters: Alex Seaver; Sebastien Najand
- Producers: Alex Seaver; Jayson De Zuzio; Madalin Rosioru

G.E.M. singles chronology
"Amazing Grace" (2024)	"Sacrifice" (2025)

Music video
- Sacrifice ft. G.E.M. (鄧紫棋) on YouTube

"Sacrifice" is a song by Hong Kong singer-songwriter G.E.M. It was released on October 13, 2025 as the official theme song of the 2025 League of Legends World Championship. The song was written by Alex Seaver and Sebastien Najand, and produced by Seaver, Jayson De Zuzio, and Madalin Rosioru. A music video was released on the same date as the song's release.

== Background ==
The 2025 World Championship was held in China - in the cities of Beijing, Shanghai, and Chengdu. The host selection was announced alongside an announcement of an extended sponsorship agreement between Chinese smartphone manufacturer OPPO and Riot Games on 24 October 2024.

On 19 September 2025, Riot Games announced that G.E.M. would be the main artist for the official theme song of the 2025 World Championship. In an interview with Sheep Esports, Riot Games' Global Head of Music Maria Egan said of G.E.M.'s selection, "she’s a superstar, and we had to find the biggest possible stage."

Recording for the song was conducted in Shanghai by G.E.M. alongside writers and producers Alex Seaver of Mako, Riot Games Principal Composer Sebastien Najand, and Jayson De Zuzio. On X (formerly Twitter), Seaver said, "We came together this year & aspired to make a ballad worthy of celebrating an emotional 15 years of Worlds and the things we give up to make it there. I realized I’d been around for so much of this history as well, wanted to give it my best."

== Release ==
"Sacrifice" was released on music streaming platforms on 13 October 2025. The title was unveiled four days prior on 9 October. The song was initially scheduled to be released on 10 October, as announced by Riot Games' 11 August 2025 development update for League of Legends. However, it was announced on 8 October that the release would be delayed to the 13th owing to cutting out FlyQuest's top laner Gabriël "Bwipo" Rau from the League of Legends Championship of The Americas (LTA), one of the five regions represented in the tournament, from the song's music video. Bwipo's removal came after he commented on a September livestream that female pros should not be playing competitively during menstruation, which was met with criticism.

G.E.M. performed the song at the 2025 League of Legends World Championship final on 9 November at the Dong'an Lake Sports Park Multifunctional Gymnasium in Chengdu, alongside a remix provided by Italian-American electronic music producer Anyma.

== Music video ==
The music video for "Sacrifice" was directed by Eddy.tv, and premiered on YouTube on 13 October 2025.

It is an animated music video that commemorates the 15th year anniversary of League of Legends esports, featuring real life professional esports players (current and retired) and personalities and various moments from previous World Championship editions. One includes a tribute at the end of the video for 2011 World Champion and Finals MVP, Maciej "Shushei" Ratuszniak, who died in April 2025 after losing a battle with cancer. The following players were featured in the video, either as their player selves or by a particular play or moment from a previous World Championship edition:

- (China) Wang "Baolan" Liuyi
- (South Korea) Gwak "Bdd" Bo-seong
- (South Korea) Cho "BeryL" Geon-hee
- (China) Chen "Bin" Zebin
- (Denmark) Rasmus "Caps" Winther
- (South Korea) Kim "Clid" Tae-min
- (South Korea) Kim "Deft" Hyuk-kyu
- (United States) Marcus "Dyrus" Hill
- (Japan) Shunsuke "Evi" Murase
- (South Korea) Lee "Faker" Sang-hyeok
- (China) Li "Flandre" Xuanjun
- (Sweden) Petter "Hjarnan" Freyschuss
- (China) Yu "JackeyLove" Wenbo
- (Poland) Marcin "Jankos" Jankowski
- (South Korea) Seo "Kanavi" Jin-hyeok
- (Vietnam) Đặng "Kati" Thanh Phê
- (South Korea) Ryu "Keria" Min-seok
- (Vietnam) Đỗ "Levi" Duy Khánh
- (South Korea) Kim "Life" Jeong-min
- (Russia) Kirill "Likkrit" Malofeyev
- (Slovenia) Mihael "Mikyx" Mehle
- (China) Lou "MISSING" Yunfeng
- (Croatia) Luka "Perkz" Perković
- (Ukraine) Alexander "PvPStejos" Glazko
- (South Korea) Hong "Pyosik" Chang-hyeon
- (Sweden) Carl Martin Erik "Rekkles" Larsson
- (South Korea) Park "Ruler" Jae-hyuk
- (Poland) Maciej "Shushei" Ratuszniak (1989-2025)
- (South Korea) Kang "TheShy" Seung-lok
- (China) Jian "Uzi" Zihao
- (South Korea) Kim "Wadid" Bae-in
- (Denmark) Martin "Wunder" Hansen
- (South Korea) Choi "Zeus" Woo-je

Other personalities in the music video included GAM Entertainment Chief Executive Officer Anthony "TK Nguyen" Nguyễn of Vietnam, League of Legends Champions Korea (LCK) caster Chun "Caster Jun" Yong-jun, and League of Legends Japan League (LJL) caster Koji "eyes" Mitarai.
