= Mercedes-Benz Arena (Shanghai) =

Indoor arena in Shanghai, China

- The Clam Shell, The Hamburger
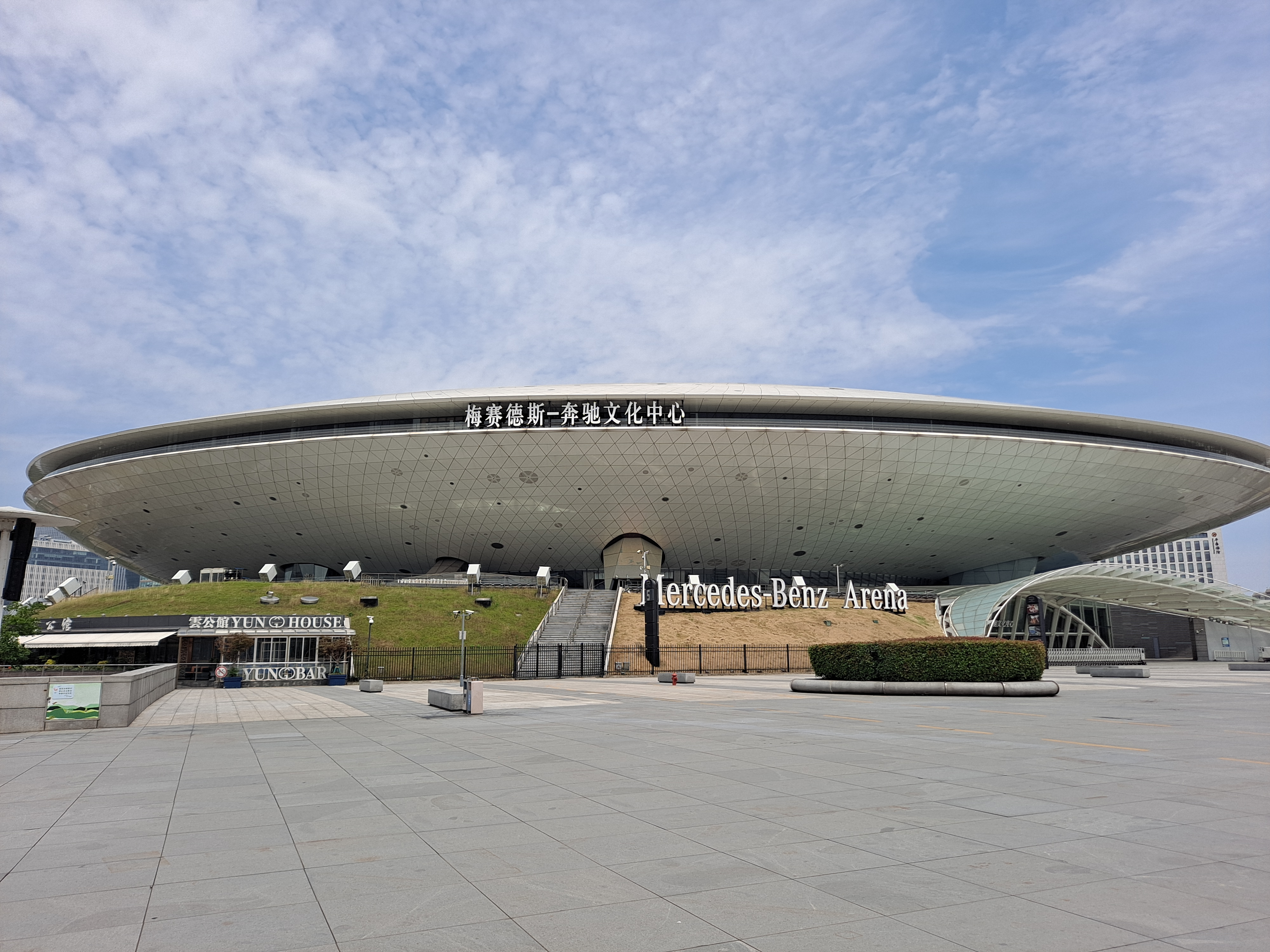
- Interactive map of Mercedes-Benz Arena
- Former names: Shanghai World Expo Cultural Center
- Address: 1200 Shibo Ave (or Expo Ave), Pudong District, Shanghai
- Coordinates: 31.191291°N 121.489391°E
- Operator: AEG
- Capacity: Main Venue maximum: 18,000; Main Venue end-stage: 13,000; The Mixing Room & Muse: 800
- Surface: Flooring
- Public transit: China Art Museum 8

Construction
- Built: 2007
- Opened: 30 April 2010
- Architects: ECADI and MANICA Architecture

The Mercedes-Benz Arena (simplified Chinese: 梅赛德斯-奔驰文化中心; traditional Chinese: 梅賽德斯-奔馳文化中心; pinyin: Méisàidésī-Bēnchí Wénhuà Zhōngxīn; Shanghainese: Me-se-teq-sy-pen-zy Ven-ho Tson-sin, literally "Mercedes-Benz Cultural Center"), formerly known as the Shanghai World Expo Cultural Center, is an indoor arena located on the former grounds of Expo 2010 in Pudong, Shanghai. It is owned and operated by the AEG-OPG joint venture.

The facility seats 18,000 people and includes a smaller venue, The Mixing Room & Muse, which is a more intimate live-music venue. The arena is known for hosting the opening ceremony for the Expo 2010, during which it was known as the Expo Cultural Center.

== Naming rights ==
The arena is sponsored in a ten-year deal by Mercedes-Benz and was officially renamed the Mercedes-Benz Arena on January 15, 2011. In June 2026, it was announced that a new naming rights partner would be sought after the naming rights deal would conclude.

== Events ==
The arena has become the most popular arena in mainland China since it opened in 2010, hosting various attractive cultural and entertainment events.

=== Music ===
Mercedes-Benz Arena is one of the most popular Shanghai venues for concert tours by performers in both Mandarin and Cantonese language, as well as by South Korean, Japanese, and Western musicians.

Furthermore, numerous notable international superstars have performed in this venue, including Adam Lambert, Akon, Alicia Keys, André Rieu, Andrea Bocelli, Aretha Franklin, Ariana Grande, Avenged Sevenfold, Avril Lavigne, The Beach Boys, Bruno Mars, Charlie Puth, The Cardigans, Eagles, Ed Sheeran, Elton John, Exo, Fall Out Boy, Imagine Dragons, Iron Maiden, James Blunt, Jane Zhang, Jennifer Lopez, Jessie J, Justin Bieber, Shawn Mendes, Katy Perry, The Killers, Lay Zhang, Lindsey Stirling, Lionel Richie, Mariah Carey, Maroon 5, Metallica, Michael Bublé, Muse, Nile Rodgers, Nine Percent, Nogizaka46, Owl City, OneRepublic, Pitbull, Richard Clayderman, Quincy Jones, Queen, Rebecca Ferguson, Rocket Girls 101, The Rolling Stones, Samantha Jade, Shinee, Simple Plan, Slash, T-ara, Taylor Swift, Tony Bennett, Troye Sivan, Usher, Unine, Playboi Carti, Westlife, Kenshi Yonezu, Kelly Yu and SNH48.

=== Sports ===
On 21 September 2017, an NHL pre-season game was held in the stadium, with the Vancouver Canucks losing 5–2 to the Los Angeles Kings. The game saw a crowd of 10,088 gather to watch the NHL's first-ever game played in China.

=== Entertainment ===
The Mercedes-Benz Arena held the annual Victoria's Secret Fashion Show in November 2017.

=== Esports ===
The arena also played host to some of the most prestigious esports events such as DOTA 2's Shanghai Major in 2016, The International 2019, and the 2023 LPL Spring Finals. It also hosted four matches, including the grand final, of the 2024 VALORANT Masters Shanghai, and both the quarterfinals and semifinals of the 2025 League of Legends World Championship. It will also host the final phase of the 2026 VALORANT Champions Shanghai, in October.

== See also ==
- List of indoor arenas in China
