= Valorant Masters Shanghai 2024 =

Esports competition in China

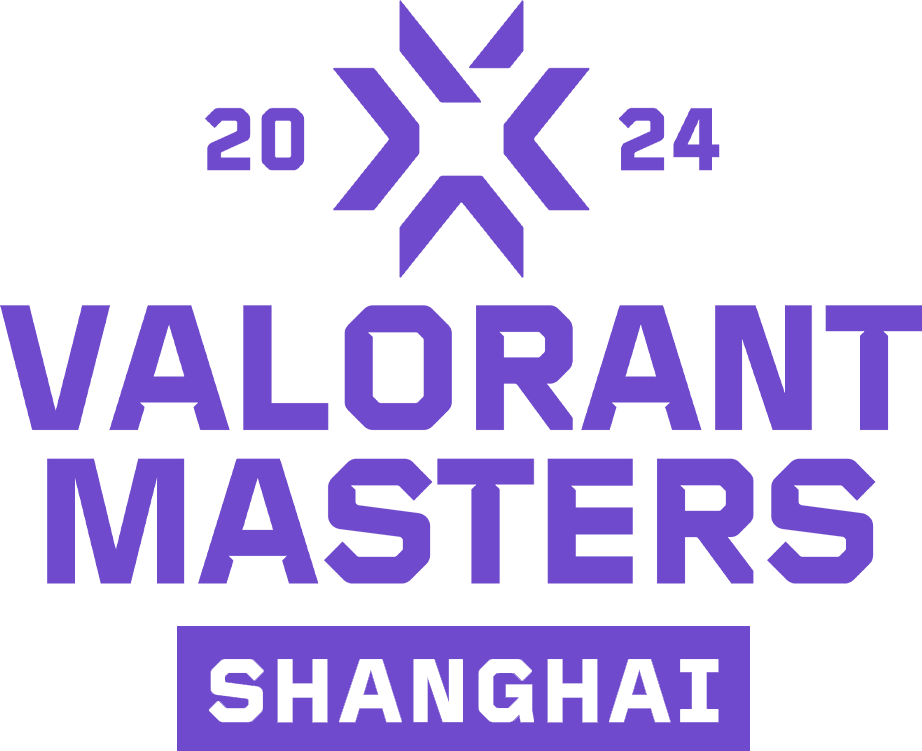

Tournament information
- Game: Valorant
- Location: Shanghai, China
- Date: May 23 – June 9, 2024
- Administrator: Riot Games
- Venue(s): VCT CN Arena (Group Stage and Playoffs); Mercedes-Benz Arena (Top 4 Playoffs + Grand Final)
- Teams: 12
- Purse: US$1,000,000

Final positions
- Champions: Gen.G
- Runner-up: Team Heretics

Tournament statistics
- Finals MVP: Kim "t3xture" Na-ra (Gen.G)
- Highest Kills: Mert "WoOt" Alkan (427 kills) (TH)
- Highest ACS: Nikita "Derke" Sirmitev (258.5) (FNC)

Valorant Masters Shanghai 2024 was a global tournament organized by Riot Games for the first-person shooter game Valorant as part of the Valorant Champions Tour 2024 competitive season. The tournament was held from May 23 to June 9 in Shanghai, China. The top three teams of each regional league of Stage 1 competed in the tournament, which included the three International Leagues (Americas, EMEA, Pacific) and the China League.

Before the finals, an exhibition match was held between Team China and Team International showcasing the game's newest map, Abyss, which Team China narrowly won, 13–11.

Gen.G from Pacific defeated Team Heretics from EMEA in the best-of-five grand final series, 3–2, to become the first-ever Pacific team to win an international Valorant event.

== Qualification ==
The top three teams in Stage 1 of all three International Leagues and China League qualified for this event. Winning teams (seed 1) received a bye to Playoffs, while runner-ups (seed 2) and third-place teams (seed 3) started from the Swiss Stage.

(*) Non-partner teams in franchise system

Region	Stage 1 Winner	Stage 1 Runner-up	Stage 1 Third-place
Americas	100 Thieves	G2 Esports*	Leviatán
EMEA	Fnatic	Team Heretics	FUT Esports
Pacific	Paper Rex	Gen.G	T1
China	Edward Gaming	FunPlus Phoenix	Dragon Ranger Gaming*

== Swiss Stage ==
- Eight teams played in the Swiss-system format with three rounds.
- Seed 2 teams faced the seed 3 teams from other regions in round 1.
- Teams had matched each other in previous rounds will not matched again.
- Teams with two wins advanced to the playoffs, while teams with two losses were eliminated.
- All matches were best-of-three series.

Advance to Playoffs
1–0	G2 Esports
0–0	G2 Esports	2	Gen.G	Advance to Playoffs
Team Heretics	2	Team Heretics	1	FUT Esports
Dragon Ranger Gaming	0	FunPlus Phoenix	1	1–1	Team Heretics
FunPlus Phoenix	2	Gen.G	2	FUT Esports	2
FUT Esports	1	Leviatán	1
G2 Esports	2	0–1	FunPlus Phoenix	1
T1	1	Leviatán	2	Team Heretics	2	Eliminated
Gen.G	2	T1	0	Leviatán
Leviatán	1	Dragon Ranger Gaming	0	FunPlus Phoenix
FUT Esports	2
Eliminated
T1
Dragon Ranger Gaming

=== Round 1 Matches ===
Round 1	May 23	G2 Esports	2	–	1	T1	Shanghai, China
	4:00 pm (UTC+8)						VCT China Arena
		13	Breeze			8	
		1	Icebox			13	
		14	Lotus			12	

Round 1	May 23	FUT Esports	1	–	2	FunPlus Phoenix	Shanghai, China
	7:00 pm (UTC+8)						VCT China Arena
		7	Sunset			13	
		14	Lotus			12	
		10	Icebox			13	

Round 1	May 24	Leviatán	1	–	2	Gen.G	Shanghai, China
	4:00 pm (UTC+8)						VCT China Arena
		13	Icebox			7	
		5	Lotus			13	
		7	Breeze			13	

Round 1	May 24	Team Heretics	2	–	0	Dragon Ranger Gaming	Shanghai, China
	7:00 pm (UTC+8)						VCT China Arena
		13	Icebox			5	
		13	Sunset			5	
			~~Split~~				

=== Round 2 Matches ===
Round 2 High	May 25	FunPlus Phoenix	1	–	2	Gen.G	Shanghai, China
							VCT China Arena
		16	Lotus			14	
		7	Sunset			13	
		11	Ascent			13	

Round 2 High	May 25	G2 Esports	2	–	1	Team Heretics	Shanghai, China
							VCT China Arena
		9	Lotus			13	
		13	Bind			6	
		13	Split			8	

Round 2 Low	May 26	Leviatán	2	–	0	T1	Shanghai, China
							VCT China Arena
		13	Breeze			9	
		13	Sunset			7	
			~~Split~~				

Round 2 Low	May 26	Dragon Ranger Gaming	0	–	2	FUT Esports	Shanghai, China
							VCT China Arena
		10	Bind			13	
		12	Ascent			14	
			~~Icebox~~				

=== Round 3 Matches ===
Round 3	May 27	FunPlus Phoenix	1	–	2	Team Heretics	Shanghai, China
	4:00 pm (CST)						VCT China Arena
		4	Sunset			13	
		13	Lotus			6	
		15	Icebox			17	

Round 3	May 27	FUT Esports	2	–	1	Leviatán	Shanghai, China
	7:00 pm (CST)						VCT China Arena
		13	Sunset			1	
		11	Lotus			13	
		13	Bind			11	

== Playoffs ==
- Seed 1 teams qualified directly to the Upper Bracket Quarterfinals, while the other four teams qualified for the playoffs from the Swiss stage.
- Each seed 1 team selected their opponent in a draw once the Swiss stages concluded.
  - Order drawn: Paper Rex (picked G2 Esports), then 100 Thieves (picked FUT Esports), then Edward Gaming (picked Team Heretics), leaving Fnatic with last remaining team (Gen.G).
- All matches were best-of-three series, except for the Lower Bracket Final and the Grand Final, which were best-of-five series.

Upper Bracket Quarterfinals	Upper Bracket Semifinals	Upper Bracket Final	Grand Final
Paper Rex	1
G2 Esports	2
G2 Esports	2
Team Heretics	1
Edward Gaming	0
Team Heretics	2
G2 Esports	0
Gen.G	2
100 Thieves	2
FUT Esports	0
100 Thieves	0
Gen.G	2
Fnatic	1
Gen.G	2	Gen.G	3
Team Heretics	2
Lower Bracket - Round 1	Lower Bracket Quarterfinals	Lower Bracket Semifinal	Lower Bracket Final
100 Thieves	2
Paper Rex	2	Paper Rex	1	G2 Esports	0
Edward Gaming	0	100 Thieves	0	Team Heretics	3
Team Heretics	2
Team Heretics	2
FUT Esports	2	FUT Esports	0
Fnatic	1

=== Upper Bracket ===
==== Quarterfinals ====
Upper Bracket Quarterfinals	May 30	100 Thieves	2	–	0	FUT Esports	Shanghai, China
	4:00 pm (CST)						VCT China Arena
		13	Icebox			2	
		13	Bind			5	
			~~Ascent~~				

Upper Bracket Quarterfinals	May 30	Fnatic	1	–	2	Gen.G	Shanghai, China
	7:00 pm (CST)						VCT China Arena
		13	Lotus			10	
		10	Bind			13	
		11	Breeze			13	

Upper Bracket Quarterfinals	May 31	Paper Rex	1	–	2	G2 Esports	Shanghai, China
	4:00 pm (CST)						VCT China Arena
		13	Split			7	
		10	Lotus			13	
		5	Bind			13	

Upper Bracket Quarterfinals	May 31	Edward Gaming	0	–	2	Team Heretics	Shanghai, China
	7:00 pm (CST)						VCT China Arena
		6	Sunset			13	
		3	Split			13	
			~~Breeze~~				

==== Semifinals ====
Upper Bracket Semifinals	June 2	G2 Esports	2	–	1	Team Heretics	Shanghai, China
	4:00 pm (CST)						VCT China Arena
		7	Icebox			13	
		13	Ascent			11	
		13	Lotus			4	

Upper Bracket Semifinals	June 2	100 Thieves	0	–	2	Gen.G	Shanghai, China
	7:00 pm (CST)						VCT China Arena
		10	Icebox			13	
		10	Ascent			13	
			~~Breeze~~				

==== Final ====
Upper Bracket Final	June 7	G2 Esports	0	–	2	Gen.G	Shanghai, China
	3:00 pm (CST)						Mercedes-Benz Arena
		8	Lotus			13	
		10	Ascent			13	
			~~Icebox~~				

=== Lower Bracket ===
==== Round 1 ====
Lower Bracket - Round 1	June 1	Paper Rex	2	–	0	Edward Gaming	Shanghai, China
	4:00 pm (CST)						VCT China Arena
		13	Bind			11	
		13	Sunset			6	
			~~Split~~				

Lower Bracket - Round 1	June 1	FUT Esports	2	–	1	Fnatic	Shanghai, China
	7:00 pm (CST)						VCT China Arena
		5	Split			13	
		13	Lotus			8	
		13	Ascent			3	

==== Quarterfinals ====
Lower Bracket Quarterfinals	June 3	100 Thieves	2	–	1	Paper Rex	Shanghai, China
	4:00 pm (CST)						VCT China Arena
		13	Breeze			5	
		10	Sunset			13	
		14	Icebox			12	

Lower Bracket Quarterfinals	June 3	Team Heretics	2	–	0	FUT Esports	Shanghai, China
	7:00 pm (CST)						VCT China Arena
		13	Bind			7	
		13	Sunset			4	
			~~Icebox~~				

==== Semifinal ====
Lower Bracket Semifinals	June 7	100 Thieves	0	–	2	Team Heretics	Shanghai, China
	6:00 pm (CST)						Mercedes-Benz Arena
		13	Bind			15	
		1	Sunset			13	
			~~Icebox~~				

==== Final ====
Lower Bracket Final	June 8	G2 Esports	0	–	3	Team Heretics	Shanghai, China
	3:00 pm (CST)						Mercedes-Benz Arena
		2	Bind			13	
		6	Icebox			13	
		8	Lotus			13	
			~~Split~~				
			~~Breeze~~				

=== Grand Final ===
The winning team from the Upper Bracket Final will have the two-map ban advantage in map veto as the upper bracket team.

Grand Final	June 9	Gen.G	3	–	2	Team Heretics	Shanghai, China
	3:00 pm (CST)						Mercedes-Benz Arena
		13	Breeze			6	
		9	Icebox			13	
		9	Ascent			13	
		13	Lotus			4	
		13	Split			3	

== Final rankings ==
Place	Team	Winnings (USD)
1st	Gen.G	$350,000
2nd	Team Heretics	$200,000
3rd	G2 Esports	$125,000
4th	100 Thieves	$75,000
5th–6th	FUT Esports	$50,000
5th–6th	Paper Rex	$50,000
7th–8th	Edward Gaming	$35,000
7th–8th	Fnatic	$35,000
9th–10th	FunPlus Phoenix	$25,000
9th–10th	Leviatán	$25,000
11th–12th	Dragon Ranger Gaming	$15,000
11th–12th	T1	$15,000
