= NAts =

Russian professional gamer (born 2002)

nAts

Current team
- Team: Team Liquid
- Game: Valorant

Personal information
- Born: Ayaz Akhmetshin; July 1, 2002 (age 23); Kazan, Tatarstan

Career information
- Playing career: 2020–present

Team history
- 2020: FishkaVTom
- 2020–2022: Gambit Esports
- 2022: M3 Champions
- 2022–present: Team Liquid

Ayaz Akhmetshin (born 1 July, 2002), better known as nAts, is a Russian professional Valorant player currently playing for Team Liquid.

== Early life ==
Ayaz Akhmetshin was born on 1 July 2002 in Kazan, Tatarstan. He played tennis as a child. Akhmetshin originally aspired to be a professional Counter-Strike: Global Offensive player, but it did not work out.

== Career ==
As a part of the original roster of Gambit Esports, which he joined in 2020, Akhmetshin won the 2021 Valorant Champions Tour: Stage 3 Masters and was the runner up for the 2021 Valorant Champions. At the same time, he was pursuing a degree in law at Kazan Federal University. In 2022, because of the sanctions by Riot Games against Russian organizations due to the Russian invasion of Ukraine, Akhmetshin played independently as a part of the M3 Champions but did not qualify in any masters events and lost the Last Chance Qualifiers. Gambit released their entire roster in August, leading to him signing with Team Liquid in November.

Akhmetshin was unable to attend part of the 2025 Valorant Champions Tour: Toronto Masters with Team Liquid due to visa issues.

== Personal life ==
Akhmetshin is known for carrying a stuffed panda with him during matches. He named it after his wife and has said it gives him a sense of confidence in competition.
