= Valorant Masters London 2026 =

Esports competition in the United Kingdom

Tournament information
- Game: Valorant
- Location: London, England
- Date: June 6 – 21, 2026
- Administrator: Riot Games
- Format: Group stage; Swiss-system; Playoffs; Double Elimination
- Venue: 1 (in 1 host city)
- Teams: 12
- Purse: USD $1,000,000

Final positions
- Champions: Leviatan
- Runner-up: Paper Rex

Tournament statistics
- MVP: Bruno "Neon" Rodríguez (Leviatan)
- Highest Kills: Rodrigo "spikeziN" Lombardi (383) (Leviatan)
- Highest ACS: Papaphat "primmie" Sriprapha (277) (FULL SENSE)

Valorant Masters London 2026 was a global Valorant tournament organized by publisher Riot Games following Stage 1 of the 2026 Valorant Champions Tour (VCT). The tournament was held in London, England, marking the first international Valorant competition to be held in the country. Twelve teams qualified for the event based on their placement in their respective VCT international leagues.

In the Grand Finals, Leviatan beat Paper Rex, 3-2, to win the organization's first trophy, as well as Americas' fourth Masters trophy, breaking Pacific's Masters winning streak of 4 tournaments.

Before the finals, an exhibition match was played to showcase the game's 13th map, Summit, set in Zhangjiajie. It was won by Team Chaos, consisting of sliggy, meg, Boaster from Fnatic, Biju, and temet with a 15-13 scoreline after overtime.

== Host selection ==
On 2 October 2025, in the build-up to the 2025 Valorant Champions Finals in Paris, France, Riot Games announced the host cities for the two Valorant Masters tournaments in 2026, with London, United Kingdom being selected as the host for the second Masters event of the competitive season. The city previously hosted the 2023 Mid-Season Invitational and the 2024 League of Legends World Championship final.

== Qualification ==
The top three teams in Stage 1 of three International Leagues (Americas, EMEA, Pacific) and China League qualified for this event. Winning teams (seed 1) received a bye to Playoffs, while runner-ups (seed 2) and third-place teams (seed 3) started from the Swiss Stage.

(*) Non-partner teams in franchise system

Region	Stage 1 Winner	Stage 1 Runner-up	Stage 1 Third-place
Americas	G2 Esports*	Leviatan	NRG
EMEA	Team Heretics	Team Vitality	FUT Esports
Pacific	Paper Rex	FULL SENSE	Global Esports
China	Edward Gaming	Xi Lai Gaming*	Dragon Ranger Gaming*

== Venue ==
Before the finals of Valorant Masters Santiago 2026, Riot Games announced on 15 March that the Copper Box Arena at the Queen Elizabeth Olympic Park was selected as the venue for the London Masters. The arena previously hosted the 2023 Mid-Season Invitational for League of Legends.

London, United Kingdom
Copper Box Arena
Capacity: 7,481
Valorant Masters London 2026 is located in the United Kingdom

== Format ==
The tournament will use the same twelve-team format used in the previous Masters. The second and third seeds from each International League compete in a Swiss-system tournament stage. The four teams that achieved two wins would advance to playoffs while those that achieved two losses would be eliminated. The four teams from the Swiss stage would join the first seeds from each region in the playoffs, a double-elimination tournament to decide the event's champion.

=== Swiss stage ===
Eight teams will compete in the Swiss stage, with the four teams that achieved two wins before accruing two losses advancing to playoffs. All matches were best-of-three series.

The draw for the initial matches was held in Los Angeles, United States after the Grand Finals of the VCT Americas Stage 1. The second-seeded teams were matched against one of the four third-seeded teams, and teams from the same league cannot be drawn against each other for the first match.

Advanced to playoffs
1-0	Team Vitality
0-0	Team Vitality	2	Leviatan	Advanced to playoffs
Team Vitality	2	FUT Esports	1	Xi Lai Gaming
Dragon Ranger Gaming	0	NRG	1	1-1	FUT Esports
FULL SENSE	0	Leviatan	2	Global Esports	1
FUT Esports	2	Xi Lai Gaming	2
Leviatan	2	0-1	FUT Esports	2
Global Esports	1	Dragon Ranger Gaming	1	NRG	1	1-2
Xi Lai Gaming	0	Xi Lai Gaming	2	NRG
NRG	2	Global Esports	2	0-2	Global Esports
FULL SENSE	1	Dragon Ranger Gaming
FULL SENSE

=== Playoffs ===
- Date and time: June 12–21, began at 15:00 BST (14:00 UTC)
  - Excluding games scheduled on June 20–21, which will begin at 14:00 BST (13:00 UTC).
- Seed 1 teams qualified directly to the Upper Bracket Quarterfinals, while the other four teams qualified for the playoffs from the Swiss stage.
- Each seed 1 team selected their opponent in a draw once the Swiss stages concluded.
  - Order drawn: G2 Esports (picked Xi Lai Gaming), then Edward Gaming (picked FUT Esports), then Paper Rex (picked Leviatan), leaving Team Heretics with last remaining team (Team Vitality).
- All matches will be played in a best-of-three series, with the exception of the Lower Bracket Finals and the Grand Finals which will be played in a best-of-five

Upper Bracket Round 1	Upper Bracket Round 2	Upper Bracket Final	Grand Final
June 13, 18:00 BST
G2 Esports	1
June 15, 15:00 BST
Xi Lai Gaming	2
Xi Lai Gaming	1
June 13, 15:00 BST
Edward Gaming	2
Edward Gaming	2
June 19, 15:00 BST
FUT Esports	1
Edward Gaming	1
June 12, 15:00 BST
Paper Rex	2
Paper Rex	2
June 15, 18:00 BST
Leviatan	0
Paper Rex	2
June 12, 18:00 BST
Team Vitality	1
Team Heretics	0	June 21, 14:00 BST
Team Vitality	2	Paper Rex	2
Leviatan	3
Lower Bracket Round 1	Lower Bracket Round 2	Lower Bracket Round 3	Lower Bracket Final
June 16, 18:00 BST
June 14, 18:00 BST	FUT Esports	0	June 20, 14:00 BST
G2 Esports	0	Team Vitality	2	June 19, 17:30 BST	Edward Gaming	0
FUT Esports	2	Team Vitality	0	Leviatan	3
June 16, 15:00 BST	Leviatan	2
June 14, 15:00 BST	Leviatan	2
Leviatan	2	Xi Lai Gaming	0
Team Heretics	1
