= Valorant Masters Santiago 2026 =

Esports competition in Chile

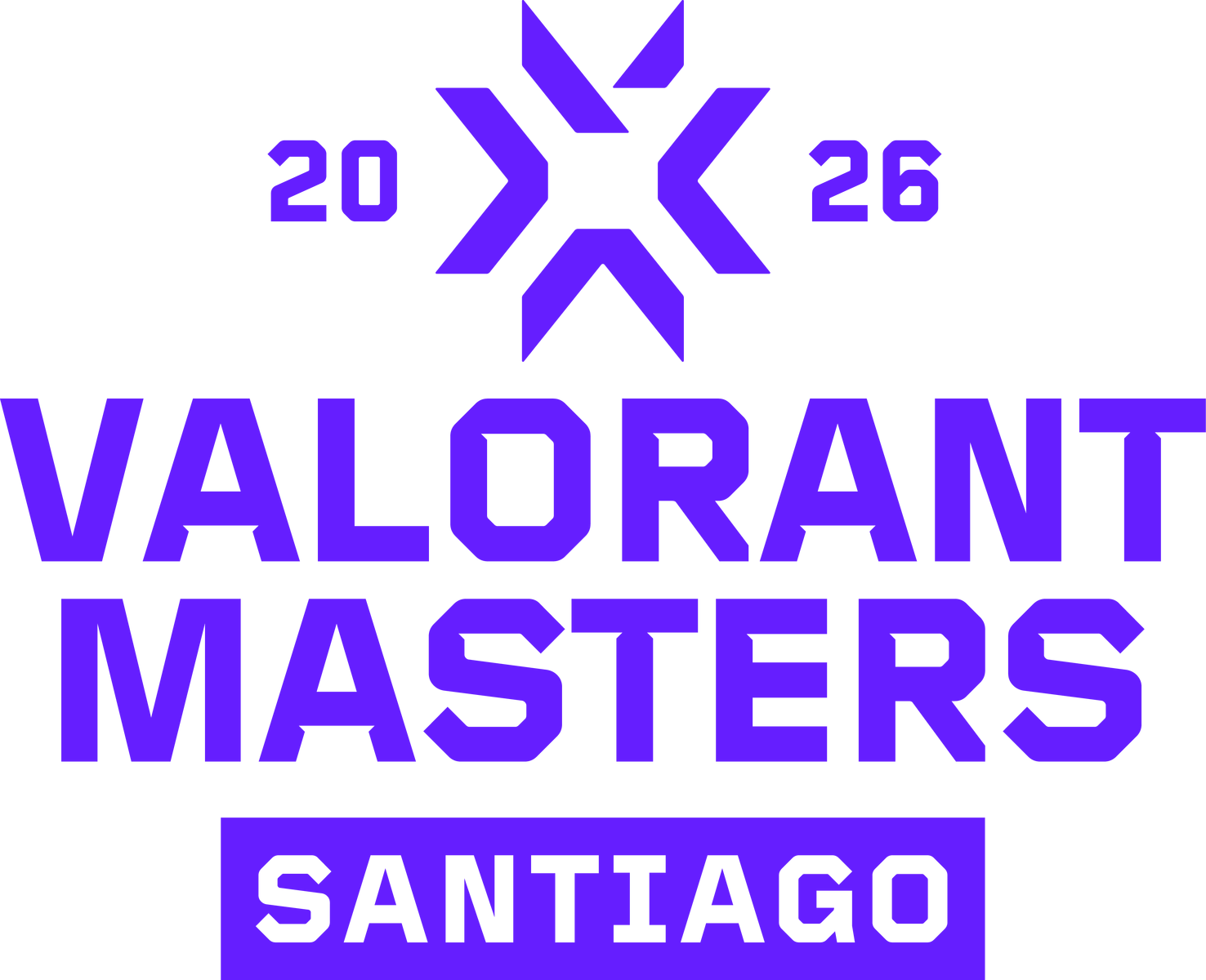

Tournament information
- Game: Valorant
- Location: Santiago, Chile
- Date: February 28 – March 15, 2026
- Administrator: Riot Games
- Format: Group stage; Swiss-system; Playoffs; Double Elimination
- Venue: 1 (in 1 host city)
- Teams: 12
- Purse: US$1,000,000

Final positions
- Champions: Nongshim RedForce
- Runner-up: Paper Rex

Tournament statistics
- MVP: Lee "Dambi" Hyuk-kyu (Nongshim RedForce)
- Highest Kills: Khalish "d4v41" Rusyaidee (371) (Paper Rex)
- Highest ACS: Martin "marteen" Pátek (268) (Gentle Mates)

Valorant Masters Santiago 2026 was a global Valorant tournament organized by publisher Riot Games following the Kickoff stage of the 2026 Valorant Champions Tour (VCT). The tournament was held from February 28 to March 15, 2026 in Santiago, Chile. It was the first Masters tournament for the Kickoff phase to feature twelve teams, with the top three teams from each region competing.

It marked the second international Valorant competition to be held in Latin America since the LOCK//IN Kickoff event in 2023, and the first to be held in Chile.

In the event's first regional grand finals match since the beginning of the partnership era, (Note: Overall, this is the fourth regional match in a VCT event's Grand Final; The first was between EMEA's Acend and Gambit Esports in 2021 Valorant Champions in Berlin. The second and third was between America's Optic Gaming and LOUD Esports in both Masters Reykjavik and 2022 Valorant Champions in Istanbul, though during that time, the Americas region was split between North America (Optic Gaming) and South America (LOUD Esports)) Nongshim RedForce swept Paper Rex, 3-0, to claim the organization's first trophy and the region's fourth consecutive Masters trophy. This also makes them the first team from the Ascension to win an international tournament.

Before the start of the grand finals, an exhibition match was played to showcase the game's 30th agent and 7th Controller, Miks, as well as a new game mode, Knockout. The showmatch also notably featured Megan of Katseye (members Sophia, Lara, Daniela, and Yoonchae were also in attendance) on team Weones Malos, alongside former player Sacy, TCK, Bstrdd, and furq.

== Host selection ==
On 2 October 2025, in the build-up to the 2025 Valorant Champions Finals in Paris, France, Riot Games announced the host cities for the two Valorant Masters tournaments in 2026, with Santiago, Chile being selected as the host for the first Masters event of the competitive season. The city hosted the first-ever esports competition of the Pan American Games during the 2023 edition.

== Qualification ==
Unlike the previous season's first Masters tournament, number of participants were increased from eight to twelve teams qualified for the tournaments from three international leagues (Americas, EMEA, Pacific) and the China league in Kickoff season. The top-seeded team from each region received a bye and automatically qualified for playoffs, while the remaining eight teams competed in the Swiss Stage to qualify for playoffs.

(*) Non-partner teams in franchise system

Region	Kickoffs 1st Seed	Kickoffs 2nd Seed	Kickoffs 3rd Seed
Americas	FURIA Esports	G2 Esports*	NRG
EMEA	BBL Esports	Gentle Mates	Team Liquid
Pacific	Nongshim RedForce*	T1	Paper Rex
China	All Gamers	Xi Lai Gaming*	Edward Gaming

== Venue ==
On 1 December 2025, the Espacio Riesco was chosen as the venue for the tournament.

Santiago, Chile
Espacio Riesco
Capacity: 10,000
Valorant Masters Santiago 2026 (Chile)

== Format ==
The tournament used the same twelve-team format used in Masters Shanghai 2024 and Masters Toronto 2025. The second and third seeds from each International League compete in a Swiss-system tournament stage. The four teams that achieved two wins would advance to playoffs while those that achieved two losses would be eliminated.

The four teams from the Swiss stage would join the first seeds from each region in the playoffs, a double-elimination tournament to decide the event's champion.

=== Swiss Stage ===
Eight teams competed in the Swiss stage, with the four teams that achieved two wins before accruing two losses advancing to playoffs. All matches were best-of-three series.

The draw for the initial matches was held in Los Angeles, United States after the lower bracket finals of the VCT Americas Kickoff. The second-seeded teams were matched against one of the four third-seeded teams, and teams from the same league cannot be drawn against each other for the first match.

All matches on 28 February and 1 March began at 14:00 CLST (17:00 UTC), while matches in the remaining days began at 15:00 CLST (18:00 UTC).

Advanced to playoffs
1-0	Paper Rex
0-0	Paper Rex	2	Gentle Mates	Advanced to playoffs
Gentle Mates	2	NRG	1	G2 Esports
Edward Gaming	0	Gentle Mates	2	1-1	NRG
T1	0	Team Liquid	0	T1	0
Team Liquid	2	G2 Esports	2
G2 Esports	0	0-1	Team Liquid	0
Paper Rex	2	Edward Gaming	0	NRG	2	1-2
Xi Lai Gaming	0	T1	2	T1
NRG	2	Xi Lai Gaming	0	0-2	Team Liquid
G2 Esports	2	Edward Gaming
Xi Lai Gaming

==== Round 1 ====
0–0; Match 1	28 February	Gentle Mates	2	–	0	Edward Gaming	Santiago, Chile
	14:00 (UTC−3)						Espacio Riesco
		13	Haven			11	
		13	Pearl			7	
			~~Abyss~~				

0–0; Match 2	28 February	Xi Lai Gaming	0	–	2	NRG	Santiago, Chile
	17:00 (UTC−3)						Espacio Riesco
		2	Haven			13	
		10	Abyss			13	
			~~Pearl~~				

0–0; Match 3	1 March	G2 Esports	0	–	2	Paper Rex	Santiago, Chile
	14:00 (UTC−3)						Espacio Riesco
		9	Split			13	
		5	Corrode			13	
			~~Breeze~~				

0–0; Match 4	1 March	T1	0	–	2	Team Liquid	Santiago, Chile
	17:00 (UTC−3)						Espacio Riesco
		8	Breeze			13	
		13	Split			15	
			~~Haven~~				

==== Round 2 ====
1–0; Match 5	2 March	Paper Rex	2	–	1	NRG	Santiago, Chile
	15:00 (UTC−3)						Espacio Riesco
		13	Split			10	
		10	Pearl			13	
		13	Haven			11	

1–0; Match 6	2 March	Gentle Mates	2	–	0	Team Liquid	Santiago, Chile
	18:00 (UTC−3)						Espacio Riesco
		13	Pearl			11	
		13	Bind			3	
			~~Split~~				

0–1; Match 7	3 March	Edward Gaming	0	–	2	T1	Santiago, Chile
	15:00 (UTC−3)						Espacio Riesco
		1	Bind			13	
		10	Haven			13	
			~~Split~~				

0–1; Match 8	3 March	Xi Lai Gaming	0	–	2	G2	Santiago, Chile
	18:00 (UTC−3)						Espacio Riesco
		8	Abyss			13	
		3	Haven			13	
			~~Breeze~~				

==== Round 3 ====
1–1; Match 7	4 March	NRG	2	–	0	Team Liquid	Santiago, Chile
	15:00 (UTC−3)						Espacio Riesco
		13	Breeze			11	
		13	Abyss			4	
			~~Pearl~~				

1–1; Match 8	4 March	G2 Esports	2	–	0	T1	Santiago, Chile
	18:00 (UTC−3)						Espacio Riesco
		13	Breeze			6	
		16	Haven			14	
			~~Split~~				

=== Playoffs ===
- Date and time: March 6–15, began at 15:00 CLST (18:00 UTC)
- Matches on March 7–8, March 13–15 began at 14:00 CLST (17:00 UTC).
- Seed 1 teams qualified directly to the Upper Bracket Quarterfinals, while the other four teams qualified for the playoffs from the Swiss stage.
- Each seed 1 team selected their opponent in a draw once the Swiss stages concluded.
  - Order drawn: Nongshim RedForce (picked Gentle Mates), then All Gamers (picked G2 Esports), then FURIA Esports (picked Paper Rex), leaving BBL with last remaining team (NRG).
- All matches were played in a best-of-three series, with the exception of the Lower Bracket Finals and the Grand Finals which were played in a best-of-five

Upper Bracket Round 1	Upper Bracket Round 2	Upper Bracket Final	Grand Final
March 6, 18:00 CLST
Nongshim RedForce	2
March 9, 15:00 CLST
Gentle Mates	0
Nongshim RedForce	2
March 7, 17:00 CLST
G2 Esports	1
All Gamers	0
March 13, 14:00 CLST
G2 Esports	2
Nongshim RedForce	2
March 6, 15:00 CLST
NRG	0
FURIA Esports	1
March 9, 18:00 CLST
Paper Rex	2
Paper Rex	0
March 7, 14:00 CLST
NRG	2
BBL Esports	1	March 15, 14:00 CLST
NRG	2	Nongshim RedForce	3
Paper Rex	0
Lower Bracket Round 1	Lower Bracket Round 2	Lower Bracket Round 3	Lower Bracket Final
March 10, 18:00 CLST
March 8, 17:00 CLST	Paper Rex	2	March 14, 14:00 CLST
Gentle Mates	1	All Gamers	1	March 13, 17:00 CLST	Paper Rex	3
All Gamers	2	Paper Rex	2	NRG	1
March 10, 15:00 CLST	G2 Esports	1
March 8, 14:00 CLST	G2 Esports	2
FURIA Esports	1	BBL Esports	0
BBL Esports	2

==== Upper Bracket ====
===== Round 1 =====
Upper Round 1 Match 9	6 March	FURIA Esports	1	–	2	Paper Rex	Santiago, Chile
	15:00 (UTC−3)						Espacio Riesco
		13	Haven			9	
		4	Breeze			13	
		7	Split			13	

Upper Round 1 Match 10	6 March	Nongshim RedForce	2	–	0	Gentle Mates	Santiago, Chile
	18:00 (UTC−3)						Espacio Riesco
		13	Haven			10	
		13	Corrode			10	
			~~Bind~~				

Upper Round 1 Match 11	7 March	BBL Esports	1	–	2	NRG	Santiago, Chile
	14:00 (UTC−3)						Espacio Riesco
		6	Pearl			13	
		13	Abyss			6	
		15	Split			17	

Upper Round 1 Match 12	7 March	All Gamers	0	–	2	G2 Esports	Santiago, Chile
	17:00 (UTC−3)						Espacio Riesco
		6	Pearl			13	
		4	Abyss			13	
			~~Bind~~				

===== Semifinals =====
Upper Round 2 Match 15	9 March	Nongshim RedForce	2	–	1	G2 Esports	Santiago, Chile
	15:00 (UTC−3)						Espacio Riesco
		7	Abyss			13	
		13	Corrode			7	
		14	Split			12	

Upper Round 2 Match 16	9 March	Paper Rex	0	–	2	NRG	Santiago, Chile
	18:00 (UTC−3)						Espacio Riesco
		12	Pearl			14	
		11	Bind			13	
			~~Split~~				

===== Finals =====
Upper Final; Match 19	13 March	Nongshim RedForce	2	–	0	NRG	Santiago, Chile
	14:00 (UTC−3)						Espacio Riesco
		13	Bind			9	
		13	Abyss			11	
			~~Haven~~				

==== Lower Bracket ====
===== Round 1 =====
Lower Round 1 Match 13	8 March	FURIA Esports	1	–	2	BBL Esports	Santiago, Chile
	14:00 (UTC−3)						Espacio Riesco
		7	Haven			13	
		13	Breeze			10	
		11	Abyss			13	

Lower Round 1 Match 14	8 March	Gentle Mates	1	–	2	All Gamers	Santiago, Chile
	17:00 (UTC−3)						Espacio Riesco
		13	Pearl			5	
		4	Split			13	
		8	Bind			13	

===== Round 2 =====
Lower Round 2 Match 17	10 March	G2 Esports	2	–	0	BBL Esports	Santiago, Chile
	15:00 (UTC−3)						Espacio Riesco
		13	Haven			5	
		13	Breeze			8	
			~~Abyss~~				

Lower Round 2 Match 18	10 March	Paper Rex	2	–	1	All Gamers	Santiago, Chile
	18:00 (UTC−3)						Espacio Riesco
		10	Corrode			13	
		13	Pearl			7	
		13	Split			4	

===== Semifinals =====
Lower Round 3 Match 20	13 March	Paper Rex	2	–	1	G2 Esports	Santiago, Chile
	17:00 (UTC−3)						Espacio Riesco
		11	Haven			13	
		13	Breeze			9	
		13	Corrode			4	

===== Finals =====
Lower Final; Match 21	14 March	Paper Rex	3	–	1	NRG	Santiago, Chile
	14:00 (UTC−3)						Espacio Riesco
		8	Pearl			13	
		13	Split			7	
		13	Corrode			6	
		13	Breeze			9	
			~~Haven~~				

==== Grand Finals ====
The winning team from the Upper Bracket Final will have the two-map ban advantage in map veto as the upper bracket team

Grand Final; Match 22	15 March	Nongshim RedForce	3	–	0	Paper Rex	Santiago, Chile
	14:00 (UTC−3)						Espacio Riesco
		13	Corrode			11	
		13	Split			4	
		13	Abyss			3	
			~~Haven~~				
			~~Bind~~				

== Final standings ==
All participating teams were awarded a share of the US$500,000 prize pool. Additionally, 1st through 6th place teams earned Championship Points to help them qualify for the 2026 Valorant Champions Shanghai, which will be held in September.

Place	Team	Winnings (USD)	Championship Points
1st	Nongshim RedForce	$350,000	6
2nd	Paper Rex	$200,000	4
3rd	NRG	$125,000	3
4th	G2 Esports	$75,000	2
5th–6th	All Gamers	$50,000	1
5th–6th	BBL Esports	$50,000	1
7th–8th	Gentle Mates	$35,000	0
7th–8th	FURIA Esports	$35,000	0
9th–10th	Team Liquid	$25,000	0
9th–10th	T1	$25,000	0
11th–12th	Edward Gaming	$15,000	0
11th–12th	Xi Lai Gaming	$15,000	0

== Controversies ==
=== Second round draw ===
After the conclusion of the first round matches on 1 March, the draw for the second round of the swiss stage was conducted immediately afterwards. However, hours after the draw, VCT commissioner Leo Faria announced that the draw would be redone due to an error of putting the first two teams drawn, Paper Rex and Gentle Mates, in the 1-0 bracket, when both teams should've been drawn in separate matchups in the same bracket. A new draw was conducted behind closed doors the night of the incident, but was not streamed live. A full video was posted on X (formerly Twitter) by Faria the day after on 2 March.
