= Valorant Masters Berlin 2021 =

Esports tournament in Berlin, Germany

- 2021

Tournament information
- Game: Valorant
- Location: Berlin, Germany
- Date: September 10–19, 2021
- Administrator: Riot Games
- Venue: Verti Music Hall
- Teams: 15
- Purse: US$700,000

Final positions
- Champion: Gambit Esports
- Runner-up: Team Envy

The Valorant Masters Berlin 2021, also known as Valorant Masters 2021 Stage 3, was a global tournament organized by Riot Games for the first first-person shooter game Valorant as part of the Valorant Champions Tour 2021 competitive season. The tournament is the second global LAN tournament to be hosted by the game, and it served as one of the qualifying tournaments leading to its global crowning event of the season, the 2021 Valorant Champions. The tournament was held from September 10–19, 2021, in Berlin, Germany.

Gambit Esports won the championship after defeating Team Envy, via 3–0 sweep in the best-of-5 grand final to become the champions of the tournament and automatically qualify for the Valorant Champions.

== Background ==
The tournament served as one of the qualifying tournaments leading to the world championship with the winner earning an automatic qualification to the global event of the season. With this, it was set to accommodate 16 teams who qualified via the regional Challengers leagues globally, and one of them is Bren Esports who originally qualified for the tournament as the Southeast Asian Challengers Champions. However, due to visa issues and the national restrictions brought by the COVID-19 pandemic, the team were forced to withdraw from the tournament and has left the tournament with 15 teams.

== Qualification ==
Region	Path	Teams
EMEA	VCT EMEA Stage 3 Challengers Champion	Gambit Esports
EMEA	VCT EMEA Stage 3 Challengers runner-up	SuperMassive Blaze
EMEA	VCT EMEA Stage 3 Challengers third placer	Acend
EMEA	VCT EMEA Stage 3 Challengers fourth placer	G2 Esports
North America	VCT North America Stage 3 Challengers Champion	Sentinels
North America	VCT North America Stage 3 Challengers runner-up	100 Thieves
North America	VCT North America Stage 3 Challengers third placer	Team Envy
Brazil	VCT Brazil Stage 3 Challengers Champion	Keyd Stars
Brazil	VCT Brazil Stage 3 Challengers runner-up	Havan Liberty
Latin America	VCT LATAM Stage 3 Challengers Champion	KRÜ Esports
Southeast Asia	VCT Southeast Asia Stage 3 Challengers Champion	~~Bren Esports~~
Southeast Asia	VCT Southeast Asia Stage 3 Challengers runner-up	Paper Rex
Japan	VCT Japan Stage 3 Challengers Champion	ZETA Division
Japan	VCT Japan Stage 3 Challengers runner-up	Crazy Raccoon
South Korea	VCT Korea Stage 3 Challengers Champion	Vision Strikers
South Korea	VCT Korea Stage 3 Challengers runner-up	Team F4Q

== Group Stage ==
The group stage was a GSL-style double elimination format, with only two teams per group qualified to the playoffs. All matches in the group stage were a best-of-three series.

=== Group A ===
Opening Matches
Vision Strikers	2
Paper Rex	0
SuperMassive Blaze	0
Acend	2
Elimination Match
Paper Rex	1
SuperMassive Blaze	2

Winners' Match
Vision Strikers	2
Acend	0
Decider Match
Acend	2
SuperMassive Blaze	1

Advanced to Playoffs
Vision Strikers
Acend

=== Group B ===
Opening Matches
Keyd Stars	0
Team Envy	2
KRÜ Esports	2
ZETA Division	1
Elimination Match
Keyd Stars	2
ZETA Division	0

Winners' Match
Team Envy	2
KRÜ Esports	0
Decider Match
KRÜ Esports	2
Keyd Stars	0

Advanced to Playoffs
Team Envy
KRÜ Esports

=== Group C ===
Opening Matches
Gambit Esports	2
Crazy Raccoon	0
100 Thieves	2
Havan Liberty	0
Elimination Match
Crazy Raccoon	2
Havan Liberty	0

Winners' Match
Gambit Esports	1
100 Thieves	2
Decider Match
Crazy Raccoon	0
Gambit Esports	2

Advanced to Playoffs
100 Thieves
Gambit Esports

=== Group D ===
As a result of Bren Esports' withdrawal from the tournament, the format for this group has been changed from GSL-style double-elimination format to a double round-robin format.

Pos	Team	Pld	W	L	PF	PA	PD	Pts	Qualification
1	G2 Esports (Q)	4	3	1	114	83	+31	7	Advanced to the quarterfinals
2	Sentinels (Q)	4	3	1	109	86	+23	7	Advanced to the quarterfinals
3	Team F4Q (E)	4	0	4	68	122	−54	4	Eliminated

Source: vlr.gg
Rules for classification: 1) Points; 2) Game difference; 3) Round differential;
(E) Eliminated; (Q) Qualified for the phase indicated

== Playoffs ==
The top two teams from each group qualified for the single-elimination crossover knockout stage. Teams are seeded in which the group winner will be paired against the second-seed of another group, which meant that teams from the same group can only meet until the Final.

The tournament saw Team Envy pull off a stunning upset with a 2-0 victory over the tournament favorites, Sentinels, while 100 Thieves staged a remarkable comeback in the quarterfinals, overturning a 7-12 deficit to secure a 14-12 win on Map 3, Breeze. In the semifinals, Team Envy secured victory over 100 Thieves, driven by yay’s dominant performance on Jett, delivering a remarkable 51-26 kill death score, while Gambit secured a 2-0 victory over G2, achieving the first-ever international 13-0 map win. Gambit then dominated the grand finals against Team Envy with a clean 3-0 sweep, securing their qualification for Valorant Champions 2021.

Quarterfinals
C1	100 Thieves	2
A2	Acend	1
B1	Team Envy	2
D2	Sentinels	0
A1	Vision Strikers	1
C2	Gambit Esports	2
D1	G2 Esports	2
B2	KRÜ Esports	0

Semifinals
C1	100 Thieves	0
B1	Team Envy	2
C2	Gambit Esports	2
D1	G2 Esports	0

Grand Final
B1	Team Envy	0
C2	Gambit Esports	3

=== Quarterfinals ===
Quarterfinals	September 16	Vision Strikers	1	–	2	Gambit Esports	Berlin, Germany
	01:00 pm (UTC+2)	Statistics					Verti Music Hall
		2	Bind			13	
		13	Split			7	
		8	Icebox			13	

Quarterfinals	September 16	G2 Esports	2	–	0	KRÜ Esports	Berlin, Germany
	04:30 pm (UTC+2)	Statistics					Verti Music Hall
		13	Icebox			9	
		13	Haven			7	
			~~Bind~~				

Quarterfinals	September 17	100 Thieves	2	–	1	Acend	Berlin, Germany
	07:00 pm (UTC+2)	Statistics					Verti Music Hall
		9	Ascent			13	
		13	Haven			8	
		14	Breeze			12	

Quarterfinals	September 17	Team Envy	2	–	0	Sentinels	Berlin, Germany
	03:00 pm (UTC+2)	Statistics					Verti Music Hall
		15	Haven			13	
		13	Split			7	
			~~Bind~~				

=== Semifinals ===
Semifinals 1	September 18	100 Thieves	0	–	2	Team Envy	Berlin, Germany
	09:00 pm (UTC+2)	Statistics					Verti Music Hall
		5	Haven			13	
		8	Ascent			13	
			~~Icebox~~				

Semifinals 2	September 18	Gambit Esports	2	–	0	G2 Esports	Berlin, Germany
	06:00 pm (UTC+2)	Statistics					Verti Music Hall
		13	Breeze			10	
		13	Icebox			0	
			~~Ascent~~				

=== Grand Final ===
Grand Final	September 19	Team Envy	0	–	3	Gambit Esports	Berlin, Germany
	06:00 pm (UTC+2)	Statistics					Verti Music Hall
		13	Bind			15	
		11	Haven			13	
		9	Split			13	
			~~Ascent~~				
			~~Icebox~~				

== Final rankings ==
Qualified for the 2021 Valorant Champions

Position	Team name	Circuit Points	Winnings (USD)
1st place, gold medalist(s)	Gambit Esports	—	$225,000
2nd place, silver medalist(s)	Team Envy	375	$125,000
3rd–4th	100 Thieves	325	$85,000
3rd–4th	G2 Esports	325	$85,000
5th–8th	Acend	275	$25,000
5th–8th	Sentinels	275	$25,000
5th–8th	Vision Strikers	275	$25,000
5th–8th	KRÜ Esports	275	$25,000
9th–12th	SuperMassive Blaze	225	$10,000
9th–12th	Keyd Stars	225	$10,000
9th–12th	Crazy Raccoon	225	$10,000
9th–12th	Team F4Q	225	$10,000
13th–15th	Paper Rex	175	$10,000
13th–15th	ZETA Division	175	$10,000
13th–15th	Havan Liberty	175	$10,000
Withdrew	Bren Esports	175	$10,000
