= Valorant Masters Tokyo 2023 =

Gaming tournament

- 2023

Tournament information
- Game: Valorant
- Location: Chiba, Japan
- Date: June 11–25, 2023
- Administrator: Riot Games
- Tournament format: Double Elimination
- Venue(s): Tipstar Dome Chiba (Group stage and Playoffs); Makuhari Messe (Lower Final and Grand Final)
- Teams: 12
- Purse: US$1,000,000

Final positions
- Champion: Fnatic
- Runner-up: Evil Geniuses

Valorant Masters Tokyo 2023 was an international esports tournament organized by Riot Games for the first-person shooter game Valorant, as part of the Valorant Champions Tour (VCT) 2023 competitive season. Although officially named Masters Tokyo, the tournament ran from June 11–25, 2023 in Chiba, Japan, instead of Tokyo.

For the 2023 season, this is the only Masters tournament to be played in the international leagues.

Fnatic have defeated Evil Geniuses via 3–0, in the best-of-5 Grand Final, to become the champions of the tournament.

== Participating teams ==
With the introduction of the international leagues, the season is divided into three leagues: Americas, Pacific, and the EMEA. The winning region of the VCT//LOCK IN 2023 earned an extra berth for their respective region to qualify for the tournament, with Fnatic winning the said tournament, hence they are given 4 slots for their region for this tournament. While the champions of the Americas and Pacific are given one direct slot each to start in the Upper Quarterfinals. China, although Valorant not officially released yet, is given 2 special spots to participate via third-party's competition.

Region	Path	Team	ID
Starting in the upper bracket quarterfinals
EMEA	VCT EMEA Champion	Team Liquid	TL
EMEA	VCT EMEA runner-up	Fnatic	FNC
Americas	VCT Americas Champion	LOUD	LOUD
Pacific	VCT Pacific Champion	Paper Rex	PRX
Starting in the group stage
EMEA	VCT EMEA League 3rd place	FÜT Esports	FÜT
EMEA	VCT EMEA League 4th place	Natus Vincere	NAVI
Americas	VCT Americas League runner-up	NRG	NRG
Americas	VCT Americas League 3rd place	Evil Geniuses	EG
Pacific	VCT Pacific League runner-up	DRX	DRX
Pacific	VCT Pacific League 3rd place	T1	T1
China	FGC Valorant Invitational Champion	Attacking Soul Esports	ASE
China	FGC Valorant Invitational runner-up	Edward Gaming	EDG

== Group stage ==
The group stages consisted of the remaining eight teams who were the runners-up or third placers of their respective regional international leagues around the world.

=== Group A ===
Opening Matches
Edward Gaming	1
T1	2
NRG	2
Natus Vincere	1
Elimination Match
Edward Gaming	2
Natus Vincere	0

Winners' Match
T1	1
NRG	2
Decider Match
T1	0
Edward Gaming	2

Advanced to Playoffs
NRG
Edward Gaming

=== Group B ===
Opening Matches
FÜT Esports	0
Evil Geniuses	2
DRX	2
Attacking Soul Esports	0
Elimination Match
FÜT Esports	2
Attacking Soul Esports	1

Winners' Match
Evil Geniuses	2
DRX	0
Decider Match
DRX	2
FÜT Esports	1

Advanced to Playoffs
Evil Geniuses
DRX

== Playoffs ==
The finalists of the EMEA League, the champions of the Pacific and Americas League all qualified for the tournament directly to the playoffs.

Majority of the playoff matches were a best-of-three series, except for the Lower Bracket Final and the Grand Final which were played in a best-of-five series. Italicized team had the two-map ban advantage as they were the upper-bracket team.

Upper Bracket Quarterfinals	Upper Bracket Semifinals	Upper Bracket Final	Grand Final
Paper Rex	2
DRX	0
Paper Rex	0
Fnatic	2
Fnatic	2
NRG	0
Fnatic	2
Evil Geniuses	1
Team Liquid	2
Edward Gaming	1
Team Liquid	0
Evil Geniuses	2
LOUD	0
Evil Geniuses	2	Fnatic	3
Evil Geniuses	0
Lower Bracket - Round 1	Lower Bracket Quarterfinals	Lower Bracket Semifinal	Lower Bracket Final
Team Liquid	1
DRX	0	NRG	2	Evil Geniuses	3
NRG	2	NRG	1	Paper Rex	2
Paper Rex	2
Paper Rex	2
Edward Gaming	2	Edward Gaming	1
LOUD	0

== Final rankings ==
Place	Team	Winnings (USD)
1st	Fnatic	$350,000
2nd	Evil Geniuses	$200,000
3rd	Paper Rex	$125,000
4th	NRG	$75,000
5th–6th	Team Liquid	$50,000
5th–6th	Edward Gaming	$50,000
7th–8th	DRX	$35,000
7th–8th	LOUD	$35,000
9th–10th	T1	$25,000
9th–10th	FÜT Esports	$25,000
11th–12th	Natus Vincere	$15,000
11th–12th	Attacking Soul Esports	$15,000

== Marketing ==
=== In-Game Drops ===
The tournament gave opportunity to all active players to earn in-game drops for free while watching the tournament. Fans must connect their account with their YouTube or Twitch channels, and they must watch the official livestream of the tournament on any Riot Games-approved channels. Each in-game drop had a specific time frame in which it can be earned. The VCT Masters Tokyo Player card were awarded during the Grand Final of the tournament, and the "Unpredictable" title was given out during the duration of the tournament.

=== Team Deathmatch Showmatch ===
Selected content creators and influencers around the world featured up in a showmatch featuring the game's newest game mode, Team Deathmatch, in which featured Team Japan vs. Team International in a three-game series. The showmatch took place before the Grand Final of the tournament.

Showmatch	June 25	Team Japan	2	–	1	Team International	Chiba, Japan
	12:00 (UTC+9)						Makuhari Messe
		100	Piazza			99	
		100	District			87	
		94	Kasbah			100	
