= PatMen =

Filipino esports player (born 2001)

Current team
- Team: Global Esports
- Role: Initiator
- Game: Valorant
- League: VCT Pacific

Personal information
- Born: Patrick Mendoza; December 5, 2001 (age 24); Angat, Bulacan, Philippines
- Nationality: Filipino

Team history
- 2022: SR Nacague
- 2023–2024: ZOL Esports
- 2025: NAOS Esports
- 2025: Paper Rex
- 2026–present: Global Esports

Patrick Mendoza (born December 4, 2001), better known by his player name PatMen, is a Filipino professional Valorant player who currently plays for Global Esports. He previously played for the Singapore-based organization Paper Rex, where he won the Valorant Champions Tour (VCT) Masters Toronto in 2025. Mendoza is the first Filipino player to win an international VCT Masters tournament. He was named the VCT Pacific Rookie of the Year and Initiator of the Year for the 2025 season.

== Early life ==
Patrick Mendoza is from Angat, Bulacan, Philippines. Before entering esports, he was a varsity basketball player in elementary school and high school at Colegio de Sta. Monica de Angat. He planned to try out for university basketball teams in Manila, but the COVID-19 pandemic prevented him from pursuing this path. During the lockdowns, his brother introduced him to Valorant. He previously played MOBA games like Dota and Mobile Legends: Bang Bang but had no prior experience with First-Person Shooter games.

== Career ==
=== 2022–2024: Early career ===
Mendoza began his professional career in the Tier 2 scene of Philippine Valorant. He played for SR Nacague in 2022 and ZOL Esports in 2023 and 2024. With ZOL Esports, he won the Predator League Philippines in 2024. ZOL Esports reached the grand finals of the VCT Challengers League Philippines in 2024 but lost to NAOS Esports, missing the Pacific Ascension tournament. Mendoza briefly played for NAOS Esports during the first quarter of 2025 in the VCT Challengers Southeast Asia.

=== 2025: Paper Rex ===
On March 4, 2025, Paper Rex announced they had signed Mendoza as a sixth man. The team made the acquisition after a poor performance in the VCT Pacific Kickoff. He eventually replaced Aaron "mindfreak" Leonhart in the starting roster.

Mendoza made his debut in April 2025 against BOOM Esports; although the team lost 1–2, he was named the MVP of the map Ascent. He later admitted to struggling with mental pressure during his initial weeks with the team. The team improved throughout VCT Pacific Stage 1, eventually defeating DRX in the lower bracket semifinals to qualify for an international event. Paper Rex finished Stage 1 in third place.

In June 2025, Mendoza and Paper Rex competed at Valorant Masters Toronto. The team went undefeated in the playoffs, beating G2 Esports and Sentinels. In the grand finals, they defeated Fnatic 3–1 to win the championship. This victory made Mendoza the first Filipino to win an international VCT trophy.

Later in the season, Paper Rex won the VCT Pacific Stage 2 title by defeating RRQ 3–1 in the finals held in Tokyo. Mendoza played a key role in the team's performance during the group stage, where they finished with a 4–1 record. The team then competed at Valorant Champions 2025 in Paris. Paper Rex finished in the top four, losing to DRX in the lower bracket semifinals.

On December 15, 2025, Paper Rex announced they had released Mendoza following an internal review. The organization cited unexpected complications from information leaks and negotiation timelines as factors in the decision.

=== 2026: Global Esports ===
On the same day as his release from Paper Rex, Global Esports announced that Mendoza had joined their roster for the 2026 VCT season. He joined a lineup that included fellow Filipino player Xavier "xavi8k" Juan.

== Player profile ==
Mendoza primarily plays the Initiator role. His former coach Alexandre "alecks" Sallé noted that Mendoza's background in team sports helped him align the team and manage relationships. Teammate Jinggg stated that Mendoza's vocal and confident personality helped improve the team's atmosphere.

Outside of competitions, Mendoza has participated in collegiate events, such as a fan meet at De La Salle University-Dasmariñas in November 2025.

== Awards and nominations ==
Mendoza received two awards at the 2025 VCT Pacific Awards. He was also nominated for Most Improved Player, which was won by DRX's player HYUNMIN.

Award	Year	Category	Result	Ref.
VCT Pacific Awards	2025	Rookie of the Year	Won	
VCT Pacific Awards	2025	Initiator of the Year	Won	
VCT Pacific Awards	2025	Most Improved Player	Nominated	
