= Paper Rex =

Singaporean esports organization

- Short name: PRX
- Founded: 2020; 6 years ago
- Division: Valorant; Pokémon Unite; Teamfight Tactics
- Region: Asia Pacific
- Based in: Singapore
- Location: Singapore; South Korea
- President: Matthew Djojonegoro
- CEO: Nikhil Hathiramani
- Manager: Kumaresan "Tommy" Ramani (team manager); Andi "Sleepy" Bangsawan (general manager - Indonesia)
- Official fan club: Paper People
- Partners: Pulsar Gaming Gears; ZOWIE; Secretlab
- Main sponsor: YOU•C1000
- Parent group: IMPLS Entertainment
- Website: www.pprx.team

Paper Rex is an esports organization based in Singapore. The organization was co-founded in January 2020 by Harley "dsn" Örwall, Nikhil "nikH" Hathiramani, Matthew Djojonegoro and Gad Tan. The organisation is mainly known for their Valorant division, being announced as one of the pioneer franchises in Valorant's premier competition, VCT 2023.

== History ==
Paper Rex was founded in January 2020 by Harley "dsn" Örwall, an ex-professional Counter-Strike player, Nikhil "nikH" Hathiramani, the founder and chief editor of CSGO2ASIA, Matthew Djojonegoro, a video game designer, and Gad Tan, a creative director who graduated from the University of New South Wales. The team uses the Dreamcore Dream Centre, a 10,000 sq ft (930 m^{2}) esports, entertainment hub, and retail store located in Singapore, to house their training centre and management staff.

== Teams ==
=== Valorant ===
==== 2020–2021 ====
Paper Rex moved into Valorant with their first roster on 19 July 2020, acquiring members of the Singaporean team Vindicta. The team underwent multiple roster changes before letting go of every player, with the last two players being benched on 5 February.

On 8 February, Paper Rex started their 2021 season by announcing the move of their Counter-Strike: Global Offensive roster into Valorant, a team consisting of Kumaresan "Tommy" Ramani, Aaron "mindfreak" Leonhart, Jason "f0rsakeN" Susanto, Benedict "Benkai" Tan, Jorell "Retla" Teo,and Khalish "d4v41" Rusyaidee and Alex "alecks" Salle as their coach.

On 20 May 2021, Paper Rex announced the departure of Tommy. On 21 May 2021, just a day later, Paper Rex announced the signing of Zhan Teng "shiba" Toh. Paper Rex placed 2nd in the Southeast Asia Stage 3 Challengers Playoffs, qualifying for VCT Masters 2 Berlin and placing 13th – 15th.

On 28 September 2021, Paper Rex announced the signing of Wang "Jinggg" Jing Jie, moving shiba to a substitute position due to his compulsory military service.

==== 2022 ====
They started the 2022 season by placing 1st in MY/SG Stage 1 Challengers and the APAC Stage 1 Challengers, qualifying for Masters Reykjavík as the top seeded team for the APAC region, where they placed 4th, their then-record high placing in an international event. Paper Rex repeated their domestic record in the next stage, placing 1st for MY/SG Stage 2 Challengers and APAC Stage 2 Challengers. This qualified them for Masters Copenhagen, where they placed 2nd behind FunPlus Phoenix, and were the first Asian (and APAC) team to reach the Grand Finals, surpassing their previous achievement and recording their highest placing in an international event thus far. Paper Rex qualified for Valorant Champions 2022 in Istanbul, Turkey, but failed to get out of the group stage and placed 9th – 12th. On 21 September 2022, Riot Games announced that Paper Rex were selected to be one of the 30 franchise teams for VCT 2023. PRX won the Valorant India Invitational 2022.

==== 2023 ====
On 22 March 2023, midway through the VCT Pacific season in Seoul, Paper Rex signed Ilya "something" Petrov, a Russian player who previously played for Sengoku Gaming.

Paper Rex qualified for Masters Tokyo and Champions Los Angeles after taking down T1 on 20 May 2023 in the upper semi-finals. The team then went on to win VCT Pacific on 28 May 2023, beating DRX 3–2 with a reverse sweep. Shortly after finishing first in the VCT Pacific League championship, Paper Rex announced their decision to make newly signed player Ilya "something" Petrov permanent by moving their In-Game Leader, Benedict "Benkai" Tan, to an inactive position on the roster.

During VCT Masters Tokyo 2023, the team had to call upon their substitute player Patiphan "CGRS" Posri as Ilya "Something" Petrov was unable to secure a visa to participate in the tournament. The team achieved third place despite not having their usual roster, falling to Evil Geniuses in the lower finals (3–2).

The team attended 2023 Valorant Champions with their full roster, and managed to attain 2nd place, after falling to Evil Geniuses in the grand finals (3–1). During the aforementioned Champions event, after Paper Rex's 2–1 victory over LOUD, Round Up Gamers interviewed Coach Alex "alecks" Salle, who revealed that Wang "Jinggg" Jing Jie would be departing the roster for the 2024 season due to his compulsory military service. He was subsequently moved to the substitute position following the conclusion of Champions.

On 11 September 2023, Paper Rex announced via social media that Patiphan "CGRS" Posri did not renew his contract and would be 'departing Paper Rex to pursue new endeavors'. On 16 September, just 5 days after the announcement of CGRS' departure, Paper Rex announced the addition of Cahya "monyet" Nugraha to the Valorant team to replace Jinggg, who will not be able to compete in 2024 to serve National service in Singapore. On the same day, Paper Rex also announced the departure of Benkai.

==== 2024 ====
Paper Rex qualified to Masters Madrid after taking down T1 in the VCT 2024: Pacific Kickoffs Semifinals with a 2–0 score. However, they lost to Gen.G with a 1–3 score in the Grand Final. In Masters Madrid, Paper Rex came in third after losing 1–3 to Sentinels in the Lower Grand Finals.

Paper Rex announced on 29 March 2024 that Wang "Jinggg" Jing Jie will be able to participate in further tournaments due to him being medically unfit for military service. As a result, Cahya "Monyet" Nugraha has been moved to the substitute role.

During VCT Pacific Stage 1, Paper Rex placed second in their group and qualified for the playoffs. They managed to come in victorious during the VCT Pacific Stage 1 Grand Finals against Gen.G, representing the Pacific Region as the first seed for Masters Shanghai. They finished 5th-6th in Masters Shanghai, after losing 1–2 to 100 Thieves in the Lower Bracket Quarterfinals.

In VCT Pacific Stage 2, Paper Rex finished with a 9–1 record in the Group Omega, placing them first in the standings and earning a bye in the playoffs. They qualified for VCT Champions 2024 after beating out Talon Esports 2–0 in the playoffs. They finished 3rd place in VCT Pacific, following a shocking 2-3 reverse sweep by DRX in the lower bracket final.

In the VCT Champions 2024 group stage, Paper Rex were met with an early loss to G2, an opponent they previously lost to in Masters Shanghai. In the lower bracket, they defeated FUT Esports but were then sent home by EDward Gaming, making this the first international event since LOCK//IN 2023 in which Paper Rex did not qualify to playoffs.

==== 2025 ====
During the 2025 season, the organization failed to qualify for Masters Bangkok after falling to DetonatioN FocusMe, making it the first time they failed to qualify for an international tournament since 2021. They subsequently made changes in their roster, moving Aaron "mindfreak" Leonhart to an inactive position and signing Patrick "PatMen" Mendoza to replace him.

In VCT Pacific Stage 1, they narrowly qualified for Masters Toronto after a reverse sweep against DRX, securing 3rd place. At the aforementioned event, they subsequently won their first international trophy after defeating two-time champions Fnatic in the Grand Finals, 3–1.

In VCT Pacific Stage 2, Paper Rex finished with a 4-1 record in the Group Omega, placing them first in the standings and earning a bye in the playoffs. They qualified for VCT Champions 2025 after beating fellow Masters champions T1, 2–0 in the playoffs. They subsequently managed to come out victorious at the Grand Finals after a dominant 3–1 win against RRQ, winning their first regional championship since Stage 1 in 2024.

Heading into Champions as favorites, the team placed fourth at event after losing to DRX 2–0 in the lower bracket semifinal. A few days after the tournament, Paper Rex announced the departure of Aaron "mindfreak" Leonhart from the organization On December 15, 2025, Paper Rex announced the departure of Patrick "PatMen" Mendoza from the team, with Adrian "invy" Jiggs Reyes from Team Secret to replace him the next day.

==== 2026 ====
During the 2026 Kickoffs, the organization earned a bye in the upper bracket qualifiers due to qualifying for Champions Paris. After dropping into the lower bracket, Paper Rex qualified for Masters Santiago by defeating RRQ in the lower bracket finals. At the said event, they made their tournament run mostly playing against all of the teams from the Americas region (Note: The only exception was in the Round 2 of the Lower Bracket against All Gamers from China, which they won 2-1), with them making it into the Grand Finals by eliminating last year's Champions winners, NRG, in the lower bracket finals after facing them three times in the event. They lost to Nongshim RedForce in a 3-0 sweep in the Grand Finals.

In VCT Pacific Stage 1, Paper Rex finished with a 4-1 record in the Group Alpha, placing them first in the standings and earning a bye in the playoffs. Dropped to the lower bracket by Global Esports, they made a lower bracket run and defeated T1, 2-1 to qualify for Masters London. They subsequently defeated FULL SENSE, 3-0 in the Grand Finals to earn a bye in the Masters as the 1st seed. Entering as favorites at the said event, they became the first team to qualify for Champions Shanghai by way of Championship Points, which they earned enough after defeating Team Vitality in the Upper Bracket Semis. Reaching for their fifth Grand Finals, they eventually lost to Leviatan, 3-2.

In VCT Pacific Stage 2, Paper Rex finished with a 3-2 record in the Group Omega, placing them second in the standings and earning a spot in the playoffs. They faced Nongshim RedForce in their first playoffs match, the same team who months prior dominated Paper Rex in a 3-0 Grand Finals loss at Masters Santiago. The result remained in favor of Nongshim RedForce, who defeated Paper Rex 2-0, knocking them into the lower bracket. In the lower bracket, they beat ONSIDE GAMING 2-0, progressing to the Lower Round 2, where VARREL pulled off an upset to eliminate Paper Rex from the tournament. They finished rather underwhelmingly, tied with the South Korean team Gen.G for 5th place. Coach Alex "alecks" Salle noted in a post-game interview that the team's play is "a little bit lackluster and a bit slow" as Paper Rex's season-long consistency began to waver.

During Champions Shanghai on October 9th, Paper Rex was eliminated from the tournament. Paper Rex entered the tournament as one of the fan favorites, yet was eliminated early, finishing 7–8th. Paper Rex had made it to the grand finals in Masters Santiago and Masters London, losing both grand finals sets. The team that eliminated Paper Rex from contention had been T1, a South Korean eSports organization. With the conclusion of the tournament, Paper Rex is yet to lift the Champions trophy.

==== Current roster ====
Paper Rex Valorant roster
Players
Coaches

Handle	Name	Nationality
f0rsakeN	Susanto, Jason	Indonesia
something	Petrov, Ilya	Russia
invy	Reyes, Adrian Jiggs	Philippines
PatMen	Mendoza, Patrick	Philippines
Primmie	Sriprapha, Papaphat	Thailand

Head coach

Alexandre "alecks" Sallé

Legend:
- (I) Inactive
- (S) Suspended
- Substitute
- (injured) Injury / Illness

Roster updated 15 December 2025.

==== Tournament history ====
Paper Rex Valorant
Valorant Champions Tour - Challengers (2021-2022)
Year	VCT Challengers								Masters 1	Masters 2	Champions
Year	Competition	G	W	L	Map W–L	Round W–L	Seed	Playoffs	Masters 1	Masters 2	Champions
2022	MY/SG Stage 1	2	2	0	4–0	52–17	1st Group A	1st place 3-0; Bleed eSports	Masters Reykjavík; 4th place 1-2; ZETA DIVISION	Masters Copenhagen; 2nd place 2-3; FunPlus Phoenix	Champions Istanbul; 9th-12th place Group Stage (1-2)
2022	APAC Stage 1	2	2	0	4–1	64–43	1st Group B	1st place 3-2; XERXIA	Masters Reykjavík; 4th place 1-2; ZETA DIVISION	Masters Copenhagen; 2nd place 2-3; FunPlus Phoenix	Champions Istanbul; 9th-12th place Group Stage (1-2)
2022	MY/SG Stage 2	7	7	0	14–1	189–82	1st	1st place 3-0; LaZe	Masters Reykjavík; 4th place 1-2; ZETA DIVISION	Masters Copenhagen; 2nd place 2-3; FunPlus Phoenix	Champions Istanbul; 9th-12th place Group Stage (1-2)
2022	APAC Stage 2	2	2	0	4-0	52-33	1st Group C	1st place 3-0; XERXIA	Masters Reykjavík; 4th place 1-2; ZETA DIVISION	Masters Copenhagen; 2nd place 2-3; FunPlus Phoenix	Champions Istanbul; 9th-12th place Group Stage (1-2)
Valorant Champions Tour – Pacific League (2023–present format)
Year	VCT Pacific								Masters 1	Masters 2	Champions
Year	Competition	G	W	L	Map W–L	Round W–L	Seed	Playoffs	Masters 1	Masters 2	Champions
2023	League	9	7	2	15–6	249–186	2nd	1st place 3-2; DRX	LOCK//IN São Paulo; 17th-32th place 0-2; Cloud9	Masters Tokyo; 3rd place 2-3; Evil Geniuses	Champions Los Angeles; 2nd place 1-3; Evil Geniuses
2024	Kickoff	1	1	0	2–1	36–30	1st Group C	2nd place 1-3; Gen.G Esports	Masters Madrid; 3rd place 1-3; Sentinels	Masters Shanghai; 5th-6th place 1-2; 100 Thieves	Champions Seoul; 9th-12th place Group Stage (1-2)
2024	Stage 1	5	4	1	8–3	133–100	2nd Group Omega	1st place 3-2; Gen.G Esports	Masters Madrid; 3rd place 1-3; Sentinels	Masters Shanghai; 5th-6th place 1-2; 100 Thieves	Champions Seoul; 9th-12th place Group Stage (1-2)
2024	Stage 2	5	5	0	10–3	154–100	1st Group Omega	3rd place 2-3; DRX	Masters Madrid; 3rd place 1-3; Sentinels	Masters Shanghai; 5th-6th place 1-2; 100 Thieves	Champions Seoul; 9th-12th place Group Stage (1-2)
2025	Kickoff	No Group Stage						7th-8th place 0-2; DetonatioN FM	Masters Bangkok; Did not qualify	Masters Toronto; 1st place 3-1; Fnatic	Champions Paris; 4th place 0-2; DRX
2025	Stage 1	5	2	3	7–7	153–149	4th Group Alpha	3rd place 2-3; Rex Regum Qeon	Masters Bangkok; Did not qualify	Masters Toronto; 1st place 3-1; Fnatic	Champions Paris; 4th place 0-2; DRX
2025	Stage 2	5	4	1	8-2	128-110	1st Group Omega	1st place 3-1; Rex Regum Qeon	Masters Bangkok; Did not qualify	Masters Toronto; 1st place 3-1; Fnatic	Champions Paris; 4th place 0-2; DRX
2026	Kickoff	No Group Stage						3rd Seed; 3-1; Rex Regum Qeon	Masters Santiago; 2nd place 0-3; Nongshim Redforce	Masters London; 2nd place 2-3; Leviatan	Champions Shanghai To be determined
2026	Stage 1	5	4	1	9-3	153-105	1st Group Alpha	1st place 3-0; FULL SENSE	Masters Santiago; 2nd place 0-3; Nongshim Redforce	Masters London; 2nd place 2-3; Leviatan	Champions Shanghai To be determined
2026	Stage 2	5	3	2	7-4	142-118	2nd Group Omega	5th-6th place 0-2; VARREL	Masters Santiago; 2nd place 0-3; Nongshim Redforce	Masters London; 2nd place 2-3; Leviatan	Champions Shanghai To be determined

=== Pokémon Unite ===
==== Current roster ====
Paper Rex Pokémon Unite roster
Players
Coaches

Handle	Name	Nationality
Bocchi	Lam Darren Chun Kit	Malaysia
Ht	Chye Lik Hen	Malaysia
Solo	Bryan Khoo	Singapore
Yang	Ng Zun Yang	Malaysia
YeMu	Lam Wei Heng	Malaysia
Reßöngs	Wayne Chua	Singapore

Head coach

- Vacant

Legend:
- (I) Inactive
- (S) Suspended
- Substitute
- (injured) Injury / Illness

Roster updated 30 October 2024.

=== Teamfight Tactics ===
==== Current roster ====
Paper Rex Teamfight Tactics roster
Players	Coaches
Handle / Name / Nationality; Kjaos / Joseph Arokiasamy, Keefe / Singapore	Head coach: Vacant
Legend: (I) Inactive; (S) Suspended; Substitute; (injured) Injury / Illness	Roster updated 11 March 2025.

== Achievements ==
=== Valorant ===
==== 2020 ====
- TheGym Singapore Invitational: 2nd place
- First Strike Malaysia & Singapore: 1st - 4th place (Qualifiers); 7th - 8th place (Playoffs)
- VSS.WF Series 1: 1st place

==== 2021 ====
- Champions Tour Malaysia & Singapore Stage 1: Challengers 1: 9th - 16th place (Qualifiers)
- Champions Tour Malaysia & Singapore Stage 1: Challengers 2: 1st - 4th place (Qualifiers); 4th place (Playoffs)
- Champions Tour Malaysia & Singapore Stage 1: Challengers 3: 4th place (Playoffs)
- EFire Master League: 2nd place (Group Stage); 1st place (Playoffs)
- Champions Tour Malaysia & Singapore Stage 2: Challengers 1: 1st - 4th place (Qualifiers); 2nd place (Main Event)
- Champions Tour Malaysia & Singapore Stage 2: Challengers 2: 1st place (Main Event)
- Champions Tour Malaysia & Singapore Stage 2: Challengers 3: 1st place (Main Event)
- Champions Tour SEA Stage 2: Challengers Finals: 3rd place
- KJC eSports VALORANT Tournament: One: 1st place (Singapore Qualifiers); 2nd place (Playoffs)
- VALO2ASIA Launch Invitational: 3rd - 4th place
- Champions Tour Malaysia & Singapore Stage 3: Challengers 1: 1st place (Main Event)
- Champions Tour Malaysia & Singapore Stage 3: Challengers 2: 2nd place (Main Event)
- Champions Tour Malaysia & Singapore Stage 3: Challengers 3: 1st place (Main Event)
- Champions Tour SEA Stage 3: Challengers Playoffs: 1st - 4th place (Group Stage); 2nd place (Playoffs)
- Valorant Champions Tour Stage 3: Masters Berlin: 13th-15th place (Group Stage)
- Champions Tour APAC Last Chance Qualifier: 5th-6th place (Knockouts)
- KJC eSports VALORANT Invitational: 1st place (Playoffs)
- Royal SEA Challenge: 1st - 2nd place (Group Stage); 3rd - 4th place (Playoffs)
- The Esports Club Showdown: 1st place

==== 2022 ====
- Champions Tour Malaysia & Singapore Stage 1: Challengers: 1st place (Playoffs)
- Champions Tour Asia-Pacific Stage 1: Challengers Playoffs: 1st place (Knockouts)
- Valorant Champions Tour Stage 1: Masters Reykjavík: 4th place (Playoffs)
- Champions Tour Malaysia & Singapore Stage 2: Challengers: 1st place (Group Stage); 1st place (Playoffs)
- Champions Tour Asia-Pacific Stage 2: Challengers Playoffs: 1st place (Playoffs)
- Valorant Champions Tour Stage 2: Masters Copenhagen: 2nd place (Playoffs)
- 2022 Valorant Champions: 9th - 12th place (Group Stage)
- Valorant India Invitational by Galaxy Racer: 1st - 2nd place (Group Stage); 1st place (Playoffs)

==== 2023 ====
- Champions Tour 2023: LOCK//IN São Paulo: 17th-32nd (Knockouts)
- Champions Tour 2023: Pacific League: 2nd place (League Play); 1st place (Playoffs)
- Champions Tour 2023: Masters Tokyo: 3rd place (Playoffs)
- 2023 Valorant Champions: 2nd place (Playoffs)
- AfreecaTV VALORANT LEAGUE: 2nd place (Group Stage in Group A); 2nd place (Playoffs)

==== 2024 ====
- Champions Tour 2024: Pacific Kickoff: 1st place (Group Stage in Group C); 2nd place (Playoffs)
- Champions Tour 2024: Masters Madrid: 3rd place (Playoffs)
- Champions Tour 2024: Pacific Stage 1: 1st place (Mid-season Playoffs)
- Champions Tour 2024: Masters Shanghai: 5th-6th place (Playoffs)
- Champions Tour 2024: Pacific Stage 2: 3rd place (Playoffs)
- 2024 Valorant Champions: 9th-12th place (Group Stage)
- VALORANT Radiant Asia Invitational: 3rd place (Swiss Stage); 1st place (Playoffs)
- Shanghai Esports Masters: 3rd-4th place

==== 2025 ====
- Champions Tour 2025: Pacific Stage 1: 3rd place (Playoffs)
- Asian Champions League by Hero Esports: 2nd place (Knockouts)
- Esports World Cup 2025: 1st place (Group Stage in group A); 4th place (Playoffs)
- Champions Tour 2025: Masters Toronto: 1st place (Playoffs)
- Champions Tour 2025: Pacific Stage 2: 1st place (Playoffs)
- 2025 Valorant Champions: 4th place (Playoffs)

2026

- Champions Tour 2026: Pacific Kickoff: 3rd place (Lower Bracket)
- Champions Tour 2026: Masters Santiago: 2nd place (Playoffs)
- Champions Tour 2026: Pacific Stage 1: 1st place (Mid-season Playoffs)
- Champions Tour 2026: Masters London: 2nd place (Playoffs)

=== Pokémon Unite ===
==== 2025 ====
- Pokémon UNITE Asia Champions League - Southeast Asia: 4th place (Playoffs)
