= Valorant Masters Reykjavík 2022 =

Gaming tournament

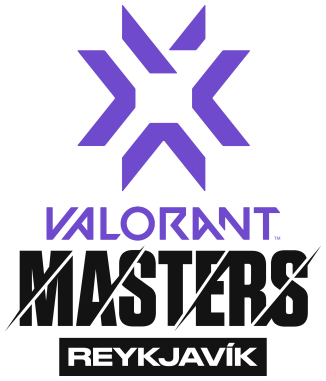

Tournament information
- Game: Valorant
- Location: Reykjavík, Iceland
- Date: April 10–24, 2022
- Administrator: Riot Games
- Venue: Laugardalshöll
- Teams: 12
- Purse: US$675,000

Final positions
- Champions: OpTic Gaming
- Runner-up: LOUD

The Valorant Masters Reykjavík 2022, also known as Valorant Masters 2021 Stage 1 was an international tournament organized by Riot Games for the first-person shooter game Valorant, as part of the Valorant Champions Tour's 2022 competitive season. The tournament ran from April 10–24, 2022, in Reykjavík, Iceland. The city also previously hosted the Valorant Masters 2021 Stage 2.

== Venue ==
Reykjavík was the city chosen to host the competition. All matches were played at Laugardalshöll without spectators.

Reykjavík, Iceland
Laugardalshöll

== Format ==
=== Tournament spots ===
The champion teams from the Asia-Pacific; EMEA (Europe, the Middle East and Africa) and North America Stage 1 Challengers were all directly qualified to the upper bracket quarterfinals. Which of the two regions Latin America and Brazil win the South America Playoff (the match between two runner-up teams from Challengers of twos) will get quarterfinals spot for their Challengers winner. The remaining eight teams were seeded in the GSL formatted group stage and were divided into two groups of four teams.

This tournament has 12 spots which are divided below:

Started in	Regions						
Started in	EMEA	North America	South America		Japan	S.Korea	Asia-Pacific (Note: Including teams from sub-regions Indonesia, Malaysia+Singapore, Philippines, Thailand, Vietnam, Taiwan+Hong Kong, Oceania, and South Asia)
Started in	EMEA	North America	Brazil	Latin America (Note: Latin America has 2 sub-regions LATAM North and LATAM South)	Japan	S.Korea	Asia-Pacific
Knockout stage (4 spots)	1	1	1 (Note: To be decided after South America Playoff match)		0	0	1
Group stage (8 spots)	2	1	1	1	1	1	1
Total (12 spots)	3	2	3		1	1	2

=== Qualified teams ===
FunPlus Phoenix originally qualified for the Stage 1 Masters after winning the 2022 EMEA Stage 1 Challengers; however, due to the travel restrictions caused by the Russian invasion of Ukraine, they were not able to field a team and were forced to withdraw from the competition. Riot then decided to replace them with Team Liquid as EMEA's third representative. With this, the squad was still awarded $25,000 and 200 circuit points, which is equivalent to an eighth-place finish — the lowest place they could have earned at the tournament.

Brazil's Challengers runner-up Ninjas in Pyjamas had won Latin America's Challengers runner-up Leviatán in South America Playoff match, leading to South America's spot in Knockout stage was given to Brazil's Challengers winner LOUD instead of Latin America's Challengers winner KRÜ Esports.

Region		Path	Team	ID
Starting in the Knockout stage
EMEA		EMEA Stage 1 Challengers runner-up	G2 Esports	G2
North America		NA Stage 1 Challengers winner	The Guard	TGRD
Asia-Pacific	MYSG	MYSG Stage 1 Challengers winner ►APAC Stage 1 Challengers winner	Paper Rex	PRX
Brazil		BR Stage 1 Challengers winner	LOUD	LLL
Starting in the group stage
EMEA		EMEA Stage 1 Challengers third-place	Fnatic	FNC
EMEA		EMEA Stage 1 Challengers fourth-place	Team Liquid	TL
North America		NA Stage 1 Challengers runner-up	OpTic Gaming	OPTC
Asia-Pacific	Thailand	Thailand Stage 1 Challengers winner ►APAC Stage 1 Challengers runner-up	XERXIA	XIA
South Korea		KR Stage 1 Challengers winner	DRX	DRX
Japan		JP Stage 1 Challengers winner	ZETA DIVISION	ZETA
Latin America	LATAM South	LATAM South Stage 1 Challengers runner-up ►LATAM Stage 1 Challengers Winner	KRÜ Esports	KRÜ
Brazil		BR Stage 1 Challengers runner-up ►South America Stage 1 Playoff winner	Ninjas in Pyjamas	NIP

=== Map pool ===
List of 7 maps are played in this tournament:

- Ascent
- Bind
- Breeze
- Fracture
- Haven
- Icebox
- Split

== Group stage ==
- 8 teams are divided into 2 groups of four teams each playing in a GSL-style double-elimination format. Two teams from the EMEA could not be placed in the same group.
- Games are held in a Bo3 series.
- 2 teams in each group will qualify for the playoffs.

=== Group A ===
Opening Matches
DRX	13	13	–	2
ZETA DIVISION	2	3	–	0
Ninjas in Pyjamas	13	13	–	2
Fnatic	7	8	–	0
Elimination Match
ZETA DIVISION	13	13	–	2
Fnatic	7	11	–	0

Winner's Match
DRX	13	13	–	2
Ninjas in Pyjamas	4	8	–	0
Decider Match
Ninjas in Pyjamas	13	10	12	1
ZETA DIVISION	6	13	14	2

Qualified
DRX
ZETA DIVISION

=== Group B ===
Opening Matches
KRÜ Esports	5	14	–	0
Team Liquid	13	16	–	2
XERXIA	13	13	–	2
OpTic Gaming	10	10	–	0
Elimination Match
KRÜ Esports	5	10	–	0
OpTic Gaming	13	13	–	2

Winner's Match
Team Liquid	13	11	17	2
XERXIA	7	13	15	1
Decider Match
XERXIA	9	6	–	0
OpTic Gaming	13	13	–	2

Qualified
Team Liquid
OpTic Gaming

== Knockout stage ==
- 4 seeded teams and 4 teams who qualified for the playoffs will play in a double-elimination tournament.
- All matches are a Bo3 series, except for the Lower Bracket Final and the Grand Final, which are a Bo5 series.
- The seeded team is drawn against the qualified team from groups.
  - Teams from same group will be on opposite sides of the Upper Bracket, meaning they cannot play each other until the Upper Bracket Finals (if both not go down to Lower Bracket).
  - Teams from same side in Upper Bracket will be on opposite sides of the Loser Bracket if both go down, meaning they cannot play each other until the Loser Bracket Semifinals.

Upper Bracket Quarterfinals	Upper Bracket Semifinals	Upper Bracket Final	Grand Final
Match 1
AQ	G2 Esports	13	13	–	2
Match 7
A	ZETA DIVISION	7	10	–	0
W1	G2 Esports	5	11	–	0
Match 2
W2	LOUD	13	13	–	2
AQ	LOUD	13	3	13	2
Match 11
B	Team Liquid	10	13	10	1
W7	LOUD	2	13	13	2
Match 3
W8	OpTic Gaming	13	8	11	1
AQ	Paper Rex	13	8	8	1
Match 8
A	DRX	10	13	13	2
W3	DRX	13	11	13	1
Match 4
W4	OpTic Gaming	8	13	15	2
AQ	The Guard	7	13	11	1	Match 14
B	OpTic Gaming	13	7	13	2	W11	LOUD	9	12	13	–	–	0
W13	OpTic Gaming	13	14	15	–	–	3
Lower Bracket Round 1	Lower Bracket Quarterfinals	Lower Bracket Semifinals	Lower Bracket Final
Match 9
Match 5	L8	DRX	11	13	4	1	Match 13
L1	ZETA Division	13	4	13	2	W5	ZETA DIVISION	13	10	13	2	Match 12	L11	OpTic Gaming	15	13	13	–	–	3
L2	Team Liquid	7	13	7	1	W9	ZETA DIVISION	6	13	13	2	W12	ZETA DIVISION	13	5	8	–	–	0
Match 10	W10	Paper Rex	13	2	10	1
Match 6	L7	G2 Esports	10	7	–	0
L3	Paper Rex	13	13	–	2	W6	Paper Rex	13	13	–	2
L4	The Guard	10	8	–	0

== Final rankings ==
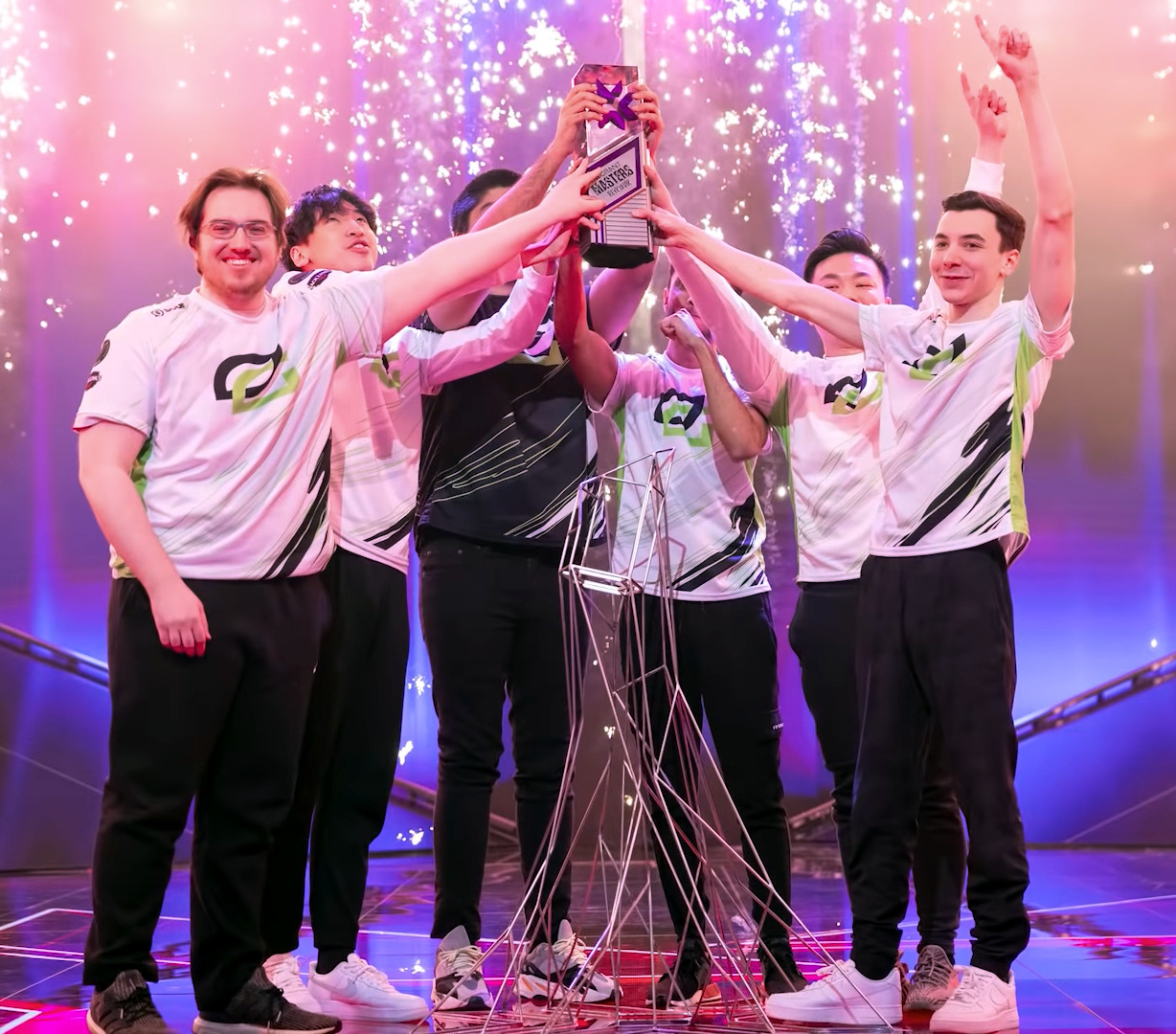
OpTic Gaming won Valorant Masters Reykjavík 2022.

Rank	Team	Winnings (USD)	Circuit Points
1st	OpTic Gaming	$200,000	750
2nd	LOUD	$120,000	500
3rd	ZETA Division	$85,000	400
4th	Paper Rex	$65,000	300
5th-6th	DRX	$40,000	250
5th-6th	G2 Esports	$40,000	250
7th-8th	Team Liquid	$25,000	200
7th-8th	The Guard	$25,000	200
9th-10th	Ninjas in Pyjamas	$15,000	150
9th-10th	XERXIA	$15,000	150
11th-12th	Fnatic	$10,000	125
11th-12th	KRÜ Esports	$10,000	125
