= Valorant Masters Toronto 2025 =

Esports competition in Canada

Tournament information
- Game: Valorant
- Location: Toronto, Canada
- Date: June 7–22, 2025
- Administrator: Riot Games
- Tournament formats: Group stage; Swiss-system; Playoffs; Double Elimination
- Venue: Enercare Centre
- Teams: 12
- Purse: US$1,000,000

Final positions
- Champions: Paper Rex
- Runner-up: Fnatic

Tournament statistics
- Finals MVP: Jason "f0rsakeN" Susanto (Paper Rex)
- Highest Kills: Emir "Alfajer" Beder (329 kills) (FNC)
- Highest ACS: Kim "t3xture" Na-ra (258)(Gen.G)

Valorant Masters Toronto 2025 was a global tournament organized by Riot Games for the first-person shooter game Valorant as part of the Valorant Champions Tour 2025 competitive season. The tournament was held between June 7–22 in Toronto, Canada. The top three teams from each Stage 1 regional league competed in the tournament, which included the three International Leagues (Americas, EMEA, Pacific) and the China League.

T1, the winners of Masters Bangkok in March, could not defend their title as they were eliminated during Stage 1 in Pacific and did not qualify for the event.

Paper Rex from Pacific defeated Fnatic from EMEA in the best-of-five Grand Final series, 3–1, and secured their first global title. Their victory, alongside T1's Masters Bangkok triumph, also made the VCT Pacific league the first league to win both Masters events in a single season.

Before the finals, an exhibition match was played to show the game's newest map, Corrode, based on Mont-Saint-Michel, France. It was won 13-7 by Team Toast, composed of Disguised Toast, TenZ, meL, Cobbie, and Sidsity.

== Qualification ==
The top three teams in Stage 1 of all three International Leagues and China League qualified for this event. The top-seeded team from each region received a bye and automatically qualified for playoffs, while the remaining eight teams competed in the Swiss Stage to qualify for playoffs.

(*) Non-partner teams in franchise system

| Region | Stage 1 Winner | Stage 1 Runner-up | Stage 1 Third-place |
|---|---|---|---|
| Americas | G2 Esports* | Sentinels | MIBR |
| EMEA | Fnatic | Team Heretics | Team Liquid |
| Pacific | Rex Regum Qeon | Gen.G | Paper Rex |
| China | Xi Lai Gaming* | Bilibili Gaming | Wolves Esports |

== Swiss Stage ==
Teams with two wins advanced to the playoffs, while teams with two losses were eliminated.

2-0 | 2-1
Advanced to playoffs | Advanced to playoffs
1-0 | Sentinels | Wolves Esports
Bilibili Gaming | 1 | Gen.G | Paper Rex
0-0 | Sentinels | 2
Team Heretics | 0 | Paper Rex | 0
Paper Rex | 2 | Gen.G | 2 | 1-1
Bilibili Gaming | 2 | Bilibili Gaming | 0
Team Liquid | 1 | Wolves Esports | 2
Sentinels | 2 | Paper Rex | 2
Wolves Esports | 0 | 0-1 | Team Liquid | 1
Gen.G | 2 | Team Heretics | 0
MIBR | 0 | Wolves Esports | 2
Team Liquid | 2 | 0-2 | 1-2
MIBR | 0 | Eliminated | Eliminated
Team Heretics | Bilibili Gaming
MIBR | Team Liquid

== Playoffs ==
Seed 1 teams qualified directly to the Upper Bracket Quarterfinals, while the other four teams qualified for the playoffs from the Swiss stage. All matches are a best-of-three series, except for the Lower Bracket and Grand Final, which are a best-of-five series.

Upper Bracket Quarterfinals | Upper Bracket Semifinals | Upper Bracket Final | Grand Final
G2 Esports | 0
Paper Rex | 2
Paper Rex | 2
Sentinels | 0
XLG Esports | 0
Sentinels | 2
Paper Rex | 2
Wolves Esports | 0
RRQ | 0
Wolves Esports | 2
Wolves Esports | 2
Gen.G Esports | 0
Fnatic | 1
Gen.G Esports | 2 | Paper Rex | 3
Fnatic | 1
Lower Bracket - Round 1 | Lower Bracket Quarterfinals | Lower Bracket Semifinals | Lower Bracket Final
Gen.G Esports | 1
G2 Esports | 2 | G2 Esports | 2 | Wolves Esports | 1
XLG Esports | 0 | G2 Esports | 0 | Fnatic | 3
Fnatic | 2
Sentinels | 1
RRQ | 1 | Fnatic | 2
Fnatic | 2

== Final rankings ==
All participating teams were awarded a share of the US$1,000,000 prize pool. Additionally, 1st through 6th place teams earned Championship Points to qualify for 2025 Valorant Champions, which was held from September 12 to October 5.

| Place | Team | Winnings (USD) | Championship Points |
|---|---|---|---|
| 1st | Paper Rex | $350,000 | 7 |
| 2nd | Fnatic | $200,000 | 5 |
| 3rd | Wolves Esports | $125,000 | 4 |
| 4th | G2 Esports | $75,000 | 3 |
| 5th–6th | Sentinels | $50,000 | 2 |
| 5th–6th | Gen.G Esports | $50,000 | 2 |
| 7th–8th | Rex Regum Qeon | $35,000 | 0 |
| 7th–8th | Xi Lai Gaming | $35,000 | 0 |
| 9th–10th | Team Liquid | $25,000 | 0 |
| 9th–10th | Bilibili Gaming | $25,000 | 0 |
| 11th–12th | Made In Brazil | $15,000 | 0 |
| 11th–12th | Team Heretics | $15,000 | 0 |
