= 2025 Valorant Champions =

Gaming tournament

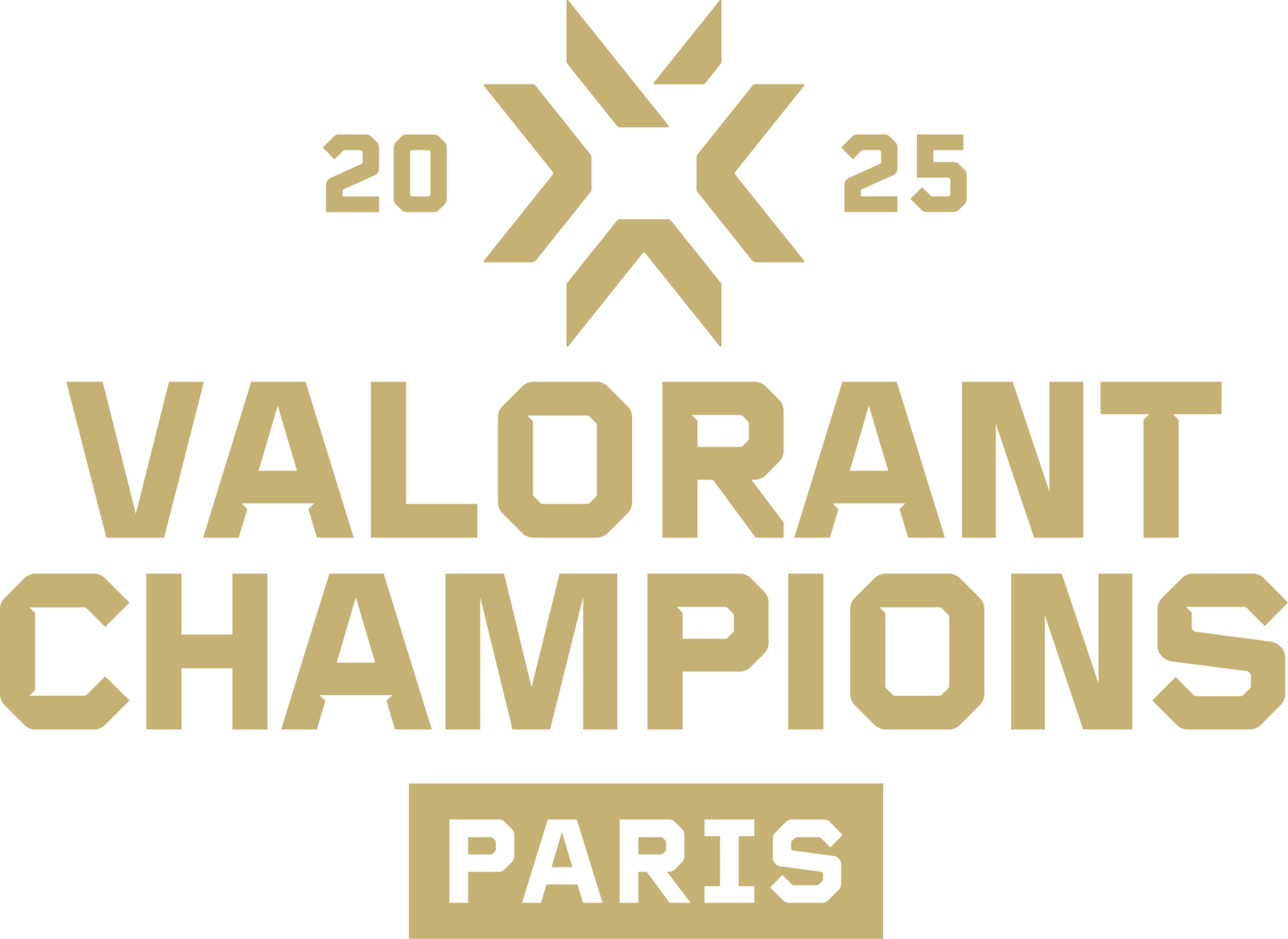

Tournament information
- Game: Valorant
- Location: Paris, France
- Date: September 12 – October 5, 2025
- Administrator: Riot Games
- Tournament formats: Group stage; GSL Format; Playoffs; Double Elimination
- Venues: 2: Les Arènes de Grand Paris Sud (Group Stage and Playoffs Stage); Accor Arena (Top 4 Playoffs + Grand Finals)
- Teams: 16
- Purse: US$2,250,000

Final positions
- Champions: NRG
- Runner-up: Fnatic
- MVP: Brock "brawk" Somerhalder (NRG)

The 2025 Valorant Champions was an esports tournament for the video game Valorant. This was the fifth edition of the Valorant Champions, the world championship tournament of the Valorant Champions Tour (VCT) for the 2025 Valorant competitive season. The tournament was held between September 12 to October 5, 2025, in Paris, and Évry-Courcouronnes, France. It marked the second staging of the event in the EMEA region after the inaugural edition in 2021 in Berlin, and the first time France hosted the tournament. Sixteen teams qualified for the tournament based on their standing in Stage 2 of their regional tournaments, as well as points accumulated from the overall tournaments held this year.

Edward Gaming was the defending champions, but failed to advance from the group stage. In the final, NRG from Americas defeated Fnatic from EMEA with a score 3–2 to win their organization's first championship, and by extension the region's third Champions title. With their victory, NRG's in-game leader (IGL), Ethan "Ethan" Arnold, became the first player to win the Champions twice (he first won the title in 2023 with Evil Geniuses). Brock "brawk" Somerhalder from NRG was named tournament MVP.

== Host selection ==
On August 17, 2024, during the 2024 Valorant Champions, Riot Games announced that Paris will host the next year's Valorant Champions, the crowning event of the VCT 2025 season.

== Venues ==
The event was held in Paris and Évry-Courcouronnes. The majority of the tournament were held at Les Arènes de Grand Paris Sud in Évry-Courcouronnes, while the final matches were held at Accor Arena in Paris.

This was the first Valorant tournament to be held in both venues, but not the first Esports events. The Les Arènes de Grand Paris Sud, which is the home arena of Karmine Corp hosted one of the stops of the League of Legends EMEA Championship's "LEC Roadtrip" during the 2025 season, while the Accor Arena staged the 2019 League of Legends World Championship final.

France
Évry-Courcouronnes	Paris
Les Arènes de Grand Paris Sud	Accor Arena
2025 Valorant Champions is located in France

== Qualified teams ==
Sixteen teams, including eight teams (seed 1/2) that finished in the top two of Stage 2, and eight teams (seed 3/4) that were out of top two but had most Championship Points in season of all three International Leagues (Americas, EMEA, Pacific) and China League, qualified for the global crowning event of the circuit.

(*) Non-partner teams in franchise system

Region	Stage 2 Winner	Stage 2 Runners-up	Championship Points #1	Championship Points #2
Americas	G2 Esports*	NRG Esports	Sentinels	MIBR
EMEA	Team Liquid	GiantX	Fnatic	Team Heretics
Pacific	Paper Rex	Rex Regum Qeon	T1	DRX
China	Bilibili Gaming	Dragon Ranger Gaming*	Edward Gaming	Xi Lai Gaming*

== Group stage ==
- Sixteen teams were drawn into four groups of four teams each. Teams from the same region cannot be placed in the same group.
- Seed 1 team play against seed 4, while seed 2 team play against seed 3 in the opening match.
- Double elimination: all matches are best-of-three.
- The eight teams consisting of the winners and runners-up of each group advance to the Playoff Stage. Remaining teams are eliminated.

=== Group A ===
Opening Match
Match 1 - 12 September
1	Paper Rex	2
4	Xi Lai Gaming	0
Match 2 - 12 September
2	GiantX	2
3	Sentinels	1
Elimination Match
Match 4 - 19 September
L1	Xi Lai Gaming	2
L2	Sentinels	1

Winners Match
Match 3 - 17 September
W1	Paper Rex	2
W2	GiantX	1
Decider Match
Match 5 - 21 September
L3	GiantX	2
W4	Xi Lai Gaming	0

Playoffs Qualified
A1	Paper Rex
A2	GiantX

Opening Match	12 September	Paper Rex	2	–	0	Xi Lai Gaming	Évry-Courcouronnes, France
	18:00 (UTC+2)						Les Arènes
		13	Bind			9	
		13	Sunset			5	
		-	~~Ascent~~			-	

Opening Match	12 September	GiantX	2	–	1	Sentinels	Évry-Courcouronnes, France
	21:00 (UTC+2)						Les Arènes
		6	Corrode			13	
		13	Sunset			4	
		13	Haven			9	

Winners Match	17 September	Paper Rex	2	–	1	GiantX	Évry-Courcouronnes, France
	18:00 (UTC+2)						Les Arènes
		11	Ascent			13	
		13	Lotus			10	
		13	Sunset			6	

Elimination Match	19 September	Xi Lai Gaming	2	–	1	Sentinels	Évry-Courcouronnes, France
	21:00 (UTC+2)						Les Arènes
		10	Abyss			13	
		13	Lotus			11	
		13	Haven			8	

Decider Match	22 September	GiantX	2	–	0	Xi Lai Gaming	Évry-Courcouronnes, France
	21:00 (UTC+2)						Les Arènes
		14	Bind			12	
		13	Ascent			10	
		-	~~Lotus~~			-	

=== Group B ===
Opening Match
Match 1 - 15 September
1	Bilibili Gaming	0
4	MIBR	2
Match 2 - 15 September
2	Rex Regum Qeon	0
3	Fnatic	2
Elimination Match
Match 4 - 20 September
L1	Bilibili Gaming	1
L2	Rex Regum Qeon	2

Winners Match
Match 3 - 18 September
W1	MIBR	1
W2	Fnatic	2
Decider Match
Match 5 - 22 September
L3	MIBR	2
W4	Rex Regum Qeon	0

Playoffs Qualified
B1	Fnatic
B2	MIBR

Opening Match	15 September	Bilibili Gaming	0	–	2	MIBR	Évry-Courcouronnes, France
	18:00 (UTC+2)						Les Arènes
		2	Haven			13	
		9	Corrode			13	
		-	~~Sunset~~			-	

Opening Match	15 September	Rex Regum Qeon	0	–	2	Fnatic	Évry-Courcouronnes, France
	21:00 (UTC+2)						Les Arènes
		10	Ascent			13	
		7	Abyss			13	
		-	~~Corrode~~			-	

Winners Match	18 September	MIBR	1	–	2	Fnatic	Évry-Courcouronnes, France
	21:00 (UTC+2)						Les Arènes
		13	Bind			5	
		7	Abyss			13	
		10	Haven			13	

Elimination Match	20 September	Bilibili Gaming	1	–	2	Rex Regum Qeon	Évry-Courcouronnes, France
	21:00 (UTC+2)						Les Arènes
		13	Sunset			7	
		8	Lotus			13	
		4	Abyss			13	

Decider Match	22 September	MIBR	2	–	0	Rex Regum Qeon	Évry-Courcouronnes, France
	21:00 (UTC+2)						Les Arènes
		13	Corrode			5	
		13	Abyss			5	
			~~Haven~~				

=== Group C ===
Opening Match
Match 1 - 13 September
1	Team Liquid	0
4	DRX	2
Match 2 - 13 September
2	NRG	2
3	Edward Gaming	0
Elimination Match
Match 4 - 19 September
L1	Team Liquid	2
L2	Edward Gaming	1

Winners Match
Match 3 - 17 September
W1	DRX	1
W2	NRG	2
Decider Match
Match 5 - 21 September
L3	DRX	2
W4	Team Liquid	0

Playoffs Qualified
C1	NRG
C2	DRX

Opening Match	13 September	Team Liquid	0	–	2	DRX	Évry-Courcouronnes, France
	21:00 (UTC+2)						Les Arènes
		8	Abyss			13	
		10	Bind			13	
		-	~~Lotus~~			-	

Opening Match	13 September	NRG	2	–	0	Edward Gaming	Évry-Courcouronnes, France
	18:00 (UTC+2)						Les Arènes
		17	Abyss			15	
		13	Corrode			11	
		-	~~Haven~~			-	

Winners Match	17 September	DRX	1	–	2	NRG	Évry-Courcouronnes, France
	21:00 (UTC+2)						Les Arènes
		13	Haven			4	
		11	Corrode			13	
		11	Lotus			13	

Elimination Match	19 September	Team Liquid	2	–	1	Edward Gaming	Évry-Courcouronnes, France
	21:00 (UTC+2)						Les Arènes
		3	Sunset			13	
		13	Abyss			6	
		15	Bind			13	

Decider Match	21 September	DRX	2	–	0	Team Liquid	Évry-Courcouronnes, France
	21:00 (UTC+2)						Les Arènes
		13	Corrode			8	
		13	Abyss			7	
		-	~~Bind~~			-	

=== Group D ===
Opening Match
Match 1 - 14 September
1	G2 Esports	0
4	Team Heretics	2
Match 2 - 14 September
2	Dragon Ranger Gaming	0
3	T1	2
Elimination Match
Match 4 - 20 September
L1	G2 Esports	2
L2	Dragon Ranger Gaming	0

Winners Match
Match 3 - 18 September
W1	Team Heretics	2
W2	T1	0
Decider Match
Match 5 - 22 September
L3	T1	0
W4	G2 Esports	2

Playoffs Qualified
D1	Team Heretics
D2	G2 Esports

Opening Match	14 September	G2 Esports	0	–	2	Team Heretics	Évry-Courcouronnes, France
	21:00 (UTC+2)						Les Arènes
		10	Corrode			13	
		10	Lotus			13	
		-	~~Haven~~			-	

Opening Match	14 September	Dragon Ranger Gaming	0	–	2	T1	Évry-Courcouronnes, France
	18:00 (UTC+2)						Les Arènes
		13	Lotus			15	
		14	Sunset			16	
		-	~~Ascent~~			-	

Winners Match	18 September	Team Heretics	2	–	0	T1	Évry-Courcouronnes, France
	21:00 (UTC+2)						Les Arènes
		13	Lotus			10	
		13	Sunset			11	
		-	~~Ascent~~			-	

Elimination Match	21 September	G2 Esports	2	–	0	Dragon Ranger Gaming	Évry-Courcouronnes, France
	21:00 (UTC+2)						Les Arènes
		13	Lotus			7	
		13	Abyss			7	
		-	~~Ascent~~			-	

Decider Match	22 September	T1	0	–	2	G2 Esports	Évry-Courcouronnes, France
	21:00 (UTC+2)						Les Arènes
		9	Lotus			13	
		8	Corrode			13	
			~~Sunset~~				

== Playoffs ==
- Eight teams were drawn into a double-elimination bracket.
- The seed 1 team of each group was drawn against the seed 2 team of a different group in Upper Quarterfinals. Teams from same group were not drawn in same bracket until the Upper Final.
- All matches were best-of-three, except for the Lower Bracket Final and the Grand Final, which were best-of-five.

Upper Quarterfinals	Upper Semifinals	Upper Final	Grand Final
Match 1 – 25 September
B1	Fnatic	2
Match 7 – 28 September
C2	DRX	1
W1	Fnatic	2
Match 2 – 25 September
W2	Paper Rex	1
A1	Paper Rex	2
Match 11 – 3 October
D2	G2 Esports	1
W7	Fnatic	0
Match 3 – 26 September
W8	NRG	2
D1	Team Heretics	0
Match 8 – 28 September
B2	MIBR	2
W3	MIBR	1
Match 4 – 26 September
W4	NRG	2
C1	NRG	2	Match 14 – 5 October
A2	GiantX	0	W11	NRG	3
W13	Fnatic	2
Lower Round 1	Lower Quarterfinals	Lower Semifinals	Lower Final
Match 9 – 29 September
Match 5 – 27 September	L8	MIBR	1	Match 13 – 4 October
L1	DRX	2	W5	DRX	2	Match 12 – 3 October	L11	Fnatic	3
L2	G2 Esports	1	W9	DRX	2	W12	DRX	1
Match 10 – 29 September	W10	Paper Rex	0
Match 6 – 27 September	L7	Paper Rex	2
L3	Team Heretics	2	W6	Team Heretics	1
L4	GiantX	1

=== Upper Bracket ===
==== Quarterfinals ====
Upper Quarterfinals	25 September	Paper Rex	2	–	1	G2 Esports	Évry-Courcouronnes, France
							Les Arènes
		13	Lotus			11	
		13	Corrode			15	
		13	Ascent			11	

Upper Quarterfinals	25 September	Fnatic	2	–	1	DRX	Évry-Courcouronnes, France
							Les Arènes
		13	Haven			11	
		8	Ascent			13	
		13	Lotus			5	

Upper Quarterfinals	26 September	Team Heretics	0	–	2	MIBR	Évry-Courcouronnes, France
							Les Arènes
		12	Corrode			14	
		6	Sunset			13	
		-	~~Haven~~			-	

Upper Quarterfinals	26 September	NRG	2	–	0	GiantX	Évry-Courcouronnes, France
							Les Arènes
		13	Haven			1	
		13	Lotus			6	
		-	~~Abyss~~			-	

==== Semifinals ====
Upper Semifinals	28 September	Fnatic	2	–	1	Paper Rex	Évry-Courcouronnes, France
							Les Arènes
		10	Bind			13	
		13	Haven			4	
		13	Lotus			9	

Upper Semifinals	28 September	MIBR	1	–	2	NRG	Évry-Courcouronnes, France
							Les Arènes
		14	Abyss			16	
		13	Haven			4	
		14	Corrode			16	

==== Final ====
Upper Final	3 October	Fnatic	0	–	2	NRG	Paris, France
							Accor Arena
		12	Ascent			14	
		5	Abyss			13	
			~~Lotus~~				

=== Lower Bracket ===
==== Round 1 ====
Lower Round 1	27 September	DRX	2	–	1	G2 Esports	Évry-Courcouronnes, France
							Les Arènes
		7	Lotus			13	
		13	Abyss			10	
		13	Bind			7	

Lower Round 1	27 September	Team Heretics	2	–	1	GiantX	Évry-Courcouronnes, France
							Les Arènes
		13	Ascent			4	
		3	Lotus			13	
		13	Bind			9	

==== Quarterfinals ====
Lower Quarterfinals	29 September	Paper Rex	2	–	1	Team Heretics	Évry-Courcouronnes, France
							Les Arènes
		13	Ascent			11	
		9	Bind			13	
		13	Lotus			4	

Lower Quarterfinals	29 September	MIBR	1	–	2	DRX	Évry-Courcouronnes, France
							Les Arènes
		13	Sunset			10	
		13	Ascent			15	
		10	Bind			13	

==== Semifinals ====
Lower Semifinals	3 October	DRX	2	–	0	Paper Rex	Paris, France
							Accor Arena
		15	Ascent			13	
		13	Lotus			8	
			~~Corrode~~				

==== Final ====
Lower Final	4 October	Fnatic	3	–	1	DRX	Paris, France
							Accor Arena
		8	Sunset			13	
		13	Corrode			3	
		13	Haven			11	
		13	Bind			4	
			~~Ascent~~				

=== Grand Final ===
Grand Final	5 October	NRG	3	–	2	Fnatic	Paris, France
							Accor Arena
		13	Corrode			3	
		13	Lotus			6	
		13	Abyss			15	
		8	Ascent			13	
		13	Sunset			5	

== Prize pool ==
Riot Games announced that the prize pool for Champions 2025 would remain the same as the last two editions. The total prize pool was US$2,250,000, and the winner of Champions received US$1,000,000.

Place	Team	Prize (USD)
1st	NRG	$1,000,000
2nd	Fnatic	$400,000
3rd	DRX	$250,000
4th	Paper Rex	$130,000
5th–6th	MIBR	$85,000
5th–6th	Team Heretics	$85,000
7th–8th	GiantX	$50,000
7th–8th	G2 Esports	$50,000
9th–12th	Rex Regum Qeon	$30,000
9th–12th	T1	$30,000
9th–12th	Xi Lai Gaming	$30,000
9th–12th	Team Liquid	$30,000
13th–16th	Dragon Ranger Gaming	$20,000
13th–16th	Bilibili Gaming	$20,000
13th–16th	Sentinels	$20,000
13th–16th	Edward Gaming	$20,000

== Marketing ==
=== Official song ===
"Last Shot" was the official theme song for the tournament, performed by templuv and 347aidan.

=== In-game ===
Before the start of the Grand Final, Valorant's 29th agent and seventh Sentinel, Veto, was revealed. He would eventually be available to play two days after the conclusion of the tournament.
