= 2021 Valorant Champions =

Esports tournament in Berlin, Germany

- 2021
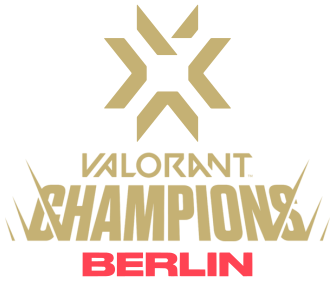

Tournament information
- Game: Valorant
- Location: Berlin, Germany
- Dates: December 1–12
- Administrators: Riot Games
- Tournament formats: 2 stages: Group stage: Double elimination bracket; Knock-out stage: Single elimination bracket
- Venues: 2 (in Berlin): Marlene-Dietrich-Halle (Group stage & Quarterfinals); Verti Music Hall (Semifinals & Finals)
- Teams: 16
- Purse: US$1,000,000

Final positions
- Champions: Acend
- Runner-up: Gambit Esports
- MVP: Aleksander "zeek" Zygmunt (Acend)

The 2021 Valorant Champions was an esports tournament for the first-person shooter video game Valorant. It was the first-ever edition of VALORANT Champions, the culmination of Valorant Champions Tour, an annual international tournament organized by the game's developer Riot Games. The tournament was held from December 1 to 12 in Berlin, Germany. Sixteen teams qualified for the tournament based on their result via 2021 VALORANT Masters: Stage 3, the regional Circuit Point standings in the year, and the regional Last Chance Qualifiers.

"Die For You" was the tournament's theme song, put together by Grabbitz, while Zedd, and Dabin, produced their own respective remix versions of the theme song.

Acend won the Valorant world championship after defeating Gambit Esports in the finals by a score of 3–2. Aleksander "zeek" Zygmunt from Acend was named the tournament MVP.

== Venues ==
Berlin was the city chosen to host the competition. The Group Stage was held at the Marlene-Dietrich-Halle, while the Semifinals and Finals was held at the Verti Music Hall.

Berlin, Germany
Group Stage	Quarterfinals	Semifinals	Finals
Marlene-Dietrich-Halle		Verti Music Hall	
Berlin is located in Germany

== Format ==
=== Tournament spots ===
A total of 16 teams qualified for Champions. The winner of the Stage 3 Masters (Gambit Esports from EMEA) automatically qualified for the event, 11 teams from North America, EMEA, Brazil, Latin America, Japan, South Korea, and Southeast Asia qualified through circuit points, and four teams qualified through four "Last Chance Qualifiers", held in North America (included teams from Oceania), EMEA, South America (Brazil + Latin America) and Asia-Pacific (China, Japan, South Korea, South Asia and Southeast Asia)

Qualification path	Regions						
Qualification path	EMEA (Note: Regional Circuit Points is available only for teams from Europe, CIS and Turkey. Teams from MENA could only compete in Last Chance Qualifier.)	North America (Note: Regional Circuit Points was not available for teams from Oceania due to no have Challengers competitions hosted by Riot Games at here. They could only compete in Last Chance Qualifier with teams from North America, and later withdrew due to travel issue in COVID-19 pandemic.)	South America		Asia-Pacific (Note: Regional Circuit Points was not available for teams from China and South Asia due to no have Challengers competitions hosted by Riot Games. Teams from China (later withdrew due to COVID-19 pandemic) and South Asia could only compete in APAC Last Chance Qualifier.)		
Qualification path	EMEA	North America	Brazil	Latin America (Note: Latin America has 2 sub-regions LATAM North and LATAM South.)	Japan	S.Korea	Southeast Asia (Note: Including teams from sub-regions Indonesia, Malaysia+Singapore, Philippines, Thailand, Vietnam, Taiwan+Hong Kong.)
Regional Circuit Points (11 spots)	2	2	2	1	1	1	2
Last Chance Qualifier (4 spots)	1	1	1		1		
VCT Masters Stage 3 champion (1 spot)	1	0					
Total (16 spots)	4	3	4		5		

=== Qualified teams ===
Region	Team	Qualified by
North America	Sentinels	North America Regional circuit points
North America	Team Envy	North America Regional circuit points
North America	Cloud9 (Note: Cloud9 had previously competed in North America Challengers as "Cloud9 Blue".)	North America Last Chance Qualifier
EMEA	Gambit Esports	Stage 3 Masters champion
EMEA	Acend	EMEA Regional circuit points
EMEA	Fnatic	EMEA Regional circuit points
EMEA	Team Liquid	EMEA Last Chance Qualifier
Brazil	Team Vikings	Brazil Regional circuit points
Brazil	Vivo Keyd	Brazil Regional circuit points
Brazil	FURIA Esports	South America Last Chance Qualifier
Latin America	KRÜ Esports	Latin America Regional circuit points
Southeast Asia	X10 CRIT (Note: X10 CRIT had previously competed in Southeast Asia Challengers as "X10 Esports" before changing their name due to sponsorship reasons.)	Southeast Asia Regional circuit points
Southeast Asia	Team Secret (Note: Team Secret acquired rosters and spot from Bren Esports before the event.)	Southeast Asia Regional circuit points
Southeast Asia	FULL SENSE	Asia-Pacific Last Chance Qualifier
South Korea	Vision Strikers	Korea Regional circuit points
Japan	Crazy Raccoon	Japan Regional circuit points

== Group stage ==
The group stage ran from December 1 to 7, 2022. Groups were decided based on teams' achievements in competitions of Valorant Challengers and Valorant Masters, circuit point, and estimated strength for each region. All 16 teams are divided into 4 groups of four teams each playing in a GSL-style double-elimination format. Games were held in a best-of-three series, and only the top two teams in each group qualified for the playoffs.

=== Brackets ===
Group A

Upper round 1
Acend	2
Vivo Keyd	1
Team Envy	2
X10 CRIT	0
Lower round 1
Vivo Keyd	0
X10 CRIT	2

Upper final
Acend	2
Team Envy	0
Lower final
Team Envy	1
X10 CRIT	2

Group B

Upper round 1
Sentinels	2
FURIA Esports	1
KRÜ Esports	0
Team Liquid	2
Lower round 1
FURIA Esports	1
KRÜ Esports	2

Upper final
Sentinels	1
Team Liquid	2
Lower final
Sentinels	1
KRÜ Esports	2

Group C

Upper round 1
Gambit Esports	2
Team Secret	1
Team Vikings	2
Crazy Raccoon	0
Lower round 1
Team Secret	2
Crazy Raccoon	0

Upper final
Gambit Esports	2
Team Vikings	1
Lower final
Team Vikings	0
Team Secret	2

Group D

Upper round 1
Vision Strikers	2
FULL SENSE	0
Fnatic	2
Cloud9	1
Lower round 1
FULL SENSE	0
Cloud9	2

Upper final
Vision Strikers	1
Fnatic	2
Lower final
Vision Strikers	1
Cloud9	2

== Knockout stage ==
The knockout stage began on December 8, culminating in the finals on December 12. Eight teams were drawn into a single-elimination bracket. The top-seeded team of each group was drawn against the second-seeded team of a different group. The teams from same group were on opposite sides of the bracket, meaning they could play each other until the Finals. All matches were best-of-three, except for the finals, which was best-of-five.

=== Bracket ===
Quarterfinals
A1	Acend	2
C2	Team Secret	0
B1	Team Liquid	2
D2	Cloud9	0
C1	Gambit Esports	2
A2	X10 CRIT	1
D1	Fnatic	1
B2	KRÜ Esports	2

Semifinals
Acend	2
Team Liquid	0
Gambit Esports	2
KRÜ Esports	1

Final
Acend	3
Gambit Esports	2

==== Acend vs. Team Secret ====
Acend vs. Team Secret Scores
Team	Score	Map	Score	Team
Acend	13	Icebox	8	Team Secret
Acend	13	Breeze	6	Team Secret
Acend	–	Split	–	Team Secret

==== Team Liquid vs. Cloud9 ====
Team Liquid vs. Cloud9 Scores
Team	Score	Map	Score	Team
Team Liquid	13	Bind	10	Cloud9
Team Liquid	13	Ascent	11	Cloud9
Team Liquid	–	Breeze	–	Cloud9

==== Gambit Esports vs. X10Crit ====
Gambit Esports vs. X10Crit Scores
Team	Score	Map	Score	Team
Gambit Esports	13	Fracture	7	X10Crit
Gambit Esports	7	Ascent	13	X10Crit
Gambit Esports	13	Breeze	7	X10Crit

==== Fnatic vs. KRÜ Esports ====
Fnatic vs. KRÜ Esports Scores
Team	Score	Map	Score	Team
KRÜ Esports	15	Haven	13	Fnatic
KRÜ Esports	6	Icebox	13	Fnatic
KRÜ Esports	13	Split	8	Fnatic

=== Semifinals ===
==== Acend vs. Team Liquid ====
Acend vs. Natus Vincere Scores
Team	Score	Map	Score	Team
Acend	13	Bind	6	Team Liquid
Acend	13	Split	5	Team Liquid
Acend	–	Ascent	–	Team Liquid

==== Gambit Esports vs. KRÜ Esports ====
Gambit Esports vs. KRÜ Esports Scores
Team	Score	Map	Score	Team
Gambit Esports	13	Breeze	8	KRÜ Esports
Gambit Esports	7	Ascent	13	KRÜ Esports
Gambit Esports	18	Bind	16	KRÜ Esports

=== Finals ===
Acend vs. Gambit Esports Scores
Team	Score	Map	Score	Team
Acend	11	Breeze	13	Gambit Esports
Acend	13	Ascent	7	Gambit Esports
Acend	3	Fracture	13	Gambit Esports
Acend	14	Icebox	12	Gambit Esports
Acend	13	Split	8	Gambit Esports

== Prize pool ==
Place	Team	GS	QF	SF	Finals	Prize (%)	Prize (USD)
1st	Acend	2–0	2–0	2–0	3–2	35%	$350,000
2nd	Gambit Esports	2–0	2–1	2–1	2–3	15%	$150,000
3rd–4th	KRÜ Esports	2–1	2–1	1–2		9%	$90,000
3rd–4th	Team Liquid	2–0	2–0	0–2		9%	$90,000
5th–8th	Team Secret	2–1	0–2			4%	$40,000
5th–8th	Cloud9 Blue	2–1	0–2			4%	$40,000
5th–8th	X10 CRIT	2–1	1–2			4%	$40,000
5th–8th	Fnatic	2–0	1–2			4%	$40,000
9th–12th	Team Envy	1–2				2%	$20,000
9th–12th	Sentinels	1–2				2%	$20,000
9th–12th	Team Vikings	1–2				2%	$20,000
9th–12th	Vision Strikers	1–2				2%	$20,000
13th–16th	Keyd Stars	0–2				2%	$20,000
13th–16th	Furia Esports	0–2				2%	$20,000
13th–16th	Crazy Raccoon	0–2				2%	$20,000
13th–16th	FULL SENSE	0–2				2%	$20,000
