= Uber Eats Music Hall =

Music hall in Berlin, Germany

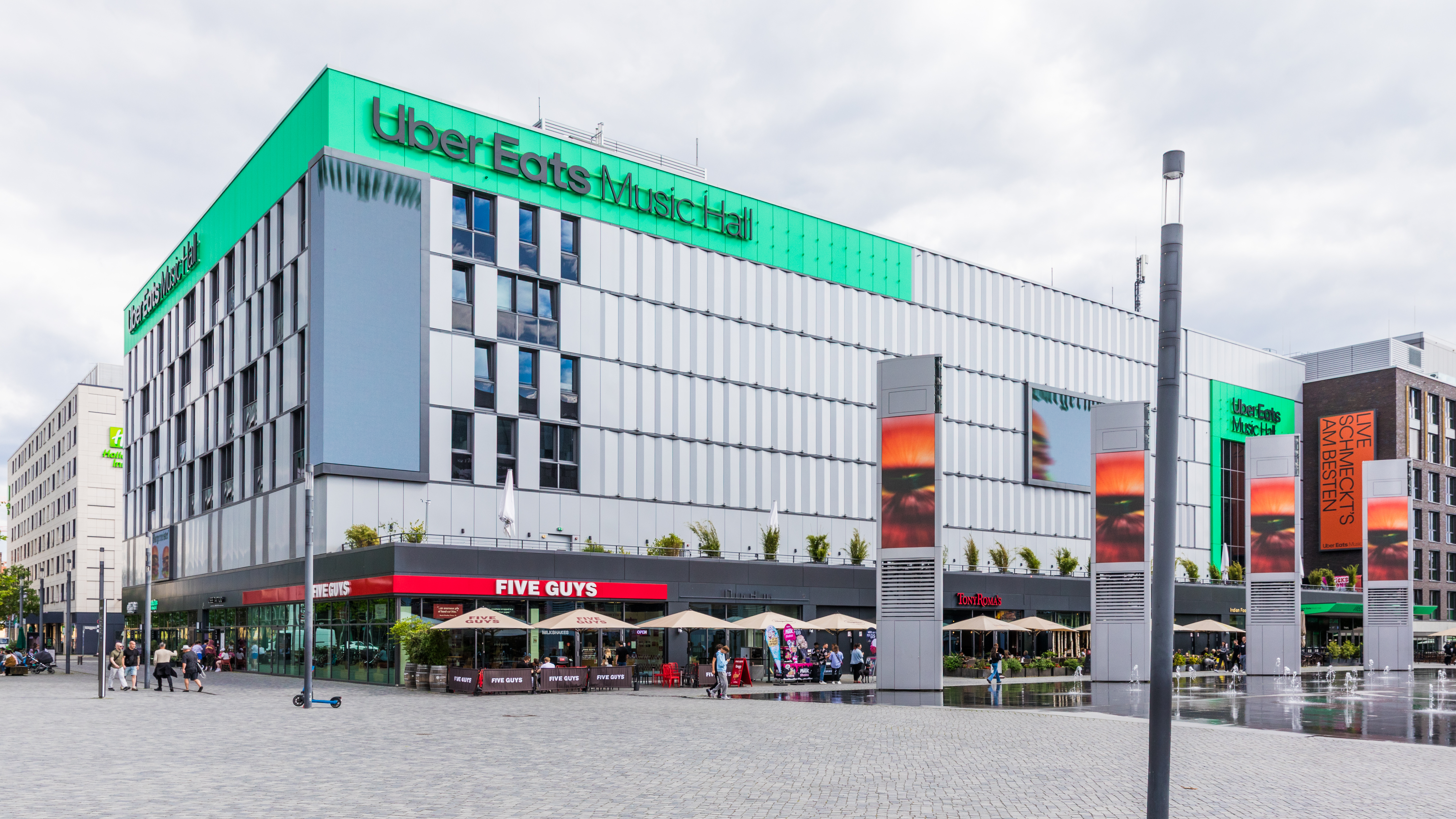
- Interactive map of Uber Eats Music Hall
- Address: Mercedes-Platz 2
- Location: Friedrichshain, Berlin, Germany
- Coordinates: 52°30′19″N 13°26′37″E
- Owner: Anschutz Entertainment Group
- Capacity: 4,500

Construction
- Opened: 2018

Website
- www.uber-eats-music-hall.de

The Uber Eats Music Hall, formerly known as the Verti Music Hall, is a music hall located on Uber-Platz in Berlin. Since it opened in 2018, up to 4,500 spectators have been able to attend concerts, shows and corporate events there. In January 2024, it was announced that the ride-hailing company Uber had secured the naming rights and that the hall would be renamed Uber Eats Music Hall on 22 March 2024.

== Founding ==
In 2015, it was announced that the hall operator, Anschutz Entertainment Group (AEG), wanted to expand its area around the Uber Arena (formerly Mercedes-Benz Arena). The plan was to create an entertainment quarter that would offer visitors a new concert venue in addition to hotels, restaurants, a cinema and a bowling alley. Around 200 million euros had been budgeted for the new event hall with an expected construction period of 24 to 30 months. At the end of 2017, it was announced that the insurance company Verti had signed the naming rights contract for the event hall, the Verti Music Hall. On 12 October 2018, the venue finally opened with an almost sold-out concert by Jack White.

== Events ==
Events at the Verti Music Hall range from concerts and festivals to sporting events and corporate events. In its first year, from October 2018 to October 2019, 43 concerts, 10 show events, 28 corporate events, 3 sporting events and a festival took place. The hall welcomed a total of 125,000 visitors. Among others, the following artists performed at the music hall: George Ezra, Gloria Gaynor, Hozier, Olivia Rodrigo, Cypress Hill, Bastille, Slash, Erykah Badu, Beth Hart, The Roots, The Beach Boys and Stray Kids.

== See also ==
- List of indoor arenas in Germany
