= 2015 EU LCS season =

- League: EU LCS
- Sport: League of Legends
- Number of teams: 10
- TV partner(s): Twitch

Spring
- Season champions: Fnatic
- Runners-up: Unicorns of Love
- Top seed: SK Gaming

Summer
- Season champions: Fnatic
- Runners-up: Origen
- Top seed: Fnatic

EU LCS seasons
- ← 2014 2016 →

The 2015 European League of Legends Championship Series (2015 EU LCS) was the third season of the European League of Legends Championship Series.

The Summer Split began with a rematch of the 2015 EU LCS Spring playoff finals between Unicorns of Love and fnatic. It was won by fnatic, their fifth split title. Most matches were played at a film studio in Adlershof, Berlin. The finals were played at the Hovet Arena Globentorget, Arenatorget in Johanneshov, Stockholm, Sweden.

== Spring ==
=== Regular season ===
Place	Team	Record
1.	SK Gaming	15 : 3
2.	Fnatic	13 : 5
3.	H2k-Gaming	12 : 6
4.	Gambit Gaming	10 : 8
5.	Unicorns of Love	9 : 9
6.	Copenhagen Wolves	8 : 10
7.	Elements	7 : 11
8.	Team ROCCAT	6 : 12
9.	Giants Gaming	5 : 13
10.	MeetYourMakers	5 : 13

== Summer ==
=== Rosters ===
Team	Players
Fnatic	Seung "Huni" Hoon Heo (허승훈); Kim "Reignover" Ui-jin (김의진); Fabian "Febiven" Diepstraten; Martin "Rekkles" Larsson; Bora "YellOwStaR" Kim
Gambit Gaming	Lucas "Cabochard" Simon-Meslet; Danil "Diamondprox" Reshetnikov; Felix "Betsy" Edling; Konstantinos "FORG1VEN" Tzortziou; "Edward" Abgaryan
GIANTS! Gaming	Jorge "Werlyb" Casanovas; Federico "Fr3deric" Lizondoà; Isaac "PePiiNeRo" Flores; Adrián "Adryh" Perez; Oskar "G0DFRED" Lundström
H2k-Gaming	Andrei "Odoamne" Pascu; Jean-Victor "loulex" Burgevin; Ryu "Ryu" Sang-wook (유상욱); Petter "Hjärnan" Freyschuss; Raymond "kaSing" Tsang
Origen	Paul "sOAZ" Boyer; Maurice "Amazing" Stückenschneider; Enrique "xPeke" Cedeño Martínez; Jesper "Niels" Svenningsen; Alfonso "Mithy" Aguirre Rodriguez
ROCCAT	Etienne "Steve" Michels; Marcin "Jankos" Jankowski; Erlend "Nukeduck" Våtevik; Rasmus "MrRalleZ" Skinneholm; Oskar "VandeR" Bogdan
Elements	Jesper "Jwaow" Strandgren; Marcel "Dexter" Feldkamp; Henrik "Froggen" Hansen; Erik "Tabzz" van Helvert; Patrick "Nyph" Funke
SK Gaming	Simon "fredy122" Payne; Dennis "Svenskeren" Johnsen; Hampus "Fox" Myhre; Adrian "CandyPanda" Wübbelmann; Christoph "nRated" Seitz
Unicorns of Love	Kiss "Vizicsacsi" Tamás; Berk "Gilius" Demir; Tristan "PowerOfEvil" Schrage; Pontus "Vardags" Dahlblom; Zdravets "Hylissang" Galabov
Copenhagen Wolves	"Lenny" Uytterhoeven; Ilyas "Shook" Hartsema; Søren "Soren" Holdt; Aleš "Freeze" Kněžínek; Christophe "je suis kaas" van Oudheusden

=== Regular season ===
Place	Team	Record
1.	Fnatic	18 : 0
2.	Origen	12 : 6
3.	H2k-Gaming	11 : 7
4.	Unicorns of Love	9 : 9
5.	Team ROCCAT	8 : 10
6.	Giants Gaming	8 : 10
7.	Elements	7 : 11
8.	Gambit Gaming	7 : 11
9.	SK Gaming	6 : 12
10.	Copenhagen Wolves	4 : 14

=== Playoffs ===
Quarterfinals
H2k-Gaming	3
Giants Gaming	0
Unicorns of Love	3
ROCCAT	2

Semifinals
Origen	3
H2k-Gaming	1
fnatic	3
Unicorns of Love	0

Finals
fnatic	3
Origen	2
Third place
H2k-Gaming	3
Unicorns of Love	0
