= 2017 EU LCS season =

- League: EU LCS
- Sport: League of Legends
- Teams: 10
- TV partner(s): Twitch, Azubu, YouTube

Spring
- Season champions: G2 Esports
- Runners-up: Unicorns of Love
- Season MVP: Tamás "Vizicsacsi" Kiss (Unicorns of Love)

Summer
- Season champions: G2 Esports
- Runners-up: Misfits Gaming
- Season MVP: Martin "Rekkles" Larsson (Fnatic)

EU LCS seasons
- ← 2016 2018 →

The 2017 European League of Legends Championship Series (2017 EU LCS) was the fifth season of the European League of Legends Championship Series (EU LCS), the highest level of professional League of Legends play in Europe. Most games were being played at Studio K/L in Adlershof, Berlin, Germany. The finals were held at the Barclaycard Arena in Hamburg, Germany.

The Spring Split was won by G2 Esports, with a roster of Expect, Trick, PerkZ, Zven, and Mithy and was their third EU LCS Champions title.

== Spring ==
=== Regular season ===
Group A

Place	Team	Series record	Game record	Points
1.	G2 Esports	12W - 1L	25W - 8L	+17
2.	Misfits	8W - 5L	19W - 12L	+7
3.	Fnatic	6W - 7L	17W - 19L	-2
4.	Team ROCCAT	6W - 7L	14W - 17L	-3
5.	Giants Gaming	2W - 11L	8W - 24L	-16

Group B

Place	Team	Series record	Game record	Points
1.	Unicorns of Love	11W - 2L	23W - 8L	+15
2.	H2k-Gaming	10W - 3L	22W - 8L	+14
3.	Splyce	7W - 6L	17W - 13L	+4
4.	Team Vitality	3W - 10L	9W - 21L	-12
5.	Origen	0W - 13L	2W - 26L	-24

=== Playoffs ===
Quarterfinals
3	Misfits	3
6	Splyce	2
4	H2k-Gaming	0
5	Fnatic	3

Semifinals
1	G2 Esports	3
6	Fnatic	1
2	Unicorns of Love	3
4	Misfits	1

Final
1	G2 Esports	3
2	Unicorns of Love	1
Third place
6	Fnatic	3
4	Misfits	0

== Summer ==
=== Regular season ===
Group A

Pos	Team	W - L (S)	W - L (G)	Points	Qualification (not final)
1.	(United Kingdom) Fnatic	9 - 1	19 - 4	+15	Advance to semifinals
2.	(Spain) G2 Esports	7 - 3	17 - 9	+8	Advance to quarterfinals
3.	(United Kingdom) Misfits	5 - 5	12 - 13	-1	Advance to quarterfinals
4.	(Germany) Team ROCCAT	3 - 7	10 - 14	-6	Remains in EU LCS for 2018 Spring Season
5.	(Sweden) Ninjas in Pyjamas	1 - 10	4 - 20	-16	Qualification to Promotion Tournament

Group B

Pos	Team	W - L (S)	W - L (G)	Points	Qualification (not final)
1.	(United Kingdom) H2k-Gaming	7 - 3	16 - 6	+10	Advance to semifinals
2.	(Germany) Unicorns of Love	6 - 4	16 - 12	+4	Advance to quarterfinals
3.	(Germany) Splyce	6 - 4	12 - 11	+1	Advance to quarterfinals
4.	(France) Team Vitality	4 - 6	10 - 13	-3	Remains in EU LCS for 2018 Spring Season
5.	(Germany) Mysterious Monkeys	3 - 8	6 - 18	-13	Qualification to Promotion Tournament
