= XPeke =

Spanish esports player (born 1992)

xPeke
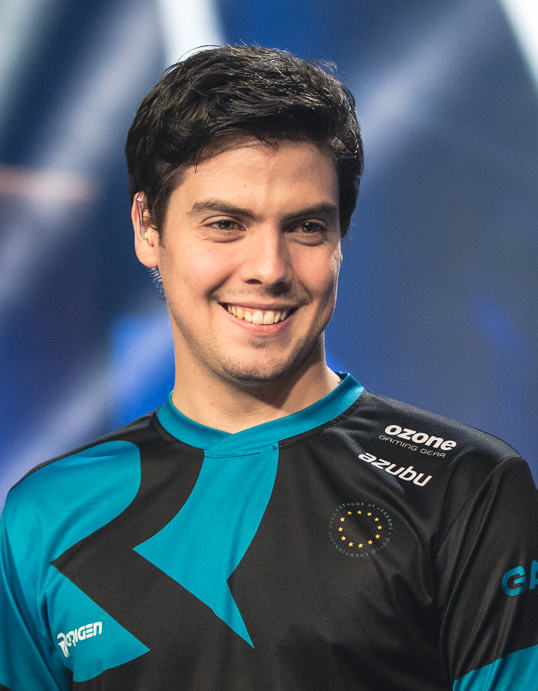
- xPeke at the 2015 League of Legends World Championship

Personal information
- Name: Enrique Cedeño Martínez
- Born: 24 April 1992 (age 34); Jumilla, Spain
- Nationality: Spanish

Career information
- Game: League of Legends
- Playing career: 2011–2017
- Role: Mid laner

Team history
- 2011: myRevenge
- 2011–2014: Fnatic
- 2015–2017: Origen

Career highlights and awards
- World champion (2011); 3× LEC champion

Enrique Cedeño Martínez (born 24 April 1992), better known by his in-game name xPeke (/ɛksˈpɛkeɪ/), is a retired professional League of Legends player. He was the founder and owner of Origen, which competed in the LEC, the top level of professional League of Legends in Europe. Martínez is best known for his spell with Fnatic, with whom he has won three League of Legends Championship Series Europe titles and the Season 1 World Championship.

== Early life ==
Enrique Cedeño Martínez was born on 24 April 1992 in Spain. His hometown is Molina de Segura in the southeastern Spanish autonomous community of Murcia.

== Career ==
Martínez first came to prominence in 2011 as a member of myRevenge, winning the Intel Extreme Masters Season V League of Legends invitational.

=== Fnatic ===
That myRevenge squad was picked up by Fnatic, with whom Martínez won the Season 1 League of Legends World Championship held at DreamHack. In 2013, he was a part of the Fnatic squad that played in the first ever split of League of Legends Championship Series Europe, eventually winning both the Spring and Summer Split, with him being named the Summer Split playoffs MVP. At IEM Season VI Katowice, Martínez "backdoored" (Note: A term to describe a situation where one sneaks into the enemy's base and quickly destroys it.) SK Gaming in a play regarded as one of the most iconic in League of Legends history due to how he accomplished it under pressure, near death, and while the enemy team was about to destroy his own base. In 2014, he won another Spring Split title with Fnatic, but lost in the Summer Split finals to Alliance. After the Season 4 World Championship, Martínez announced his departure from Fnatic with the intention to create a new team. On 7 December 2014, the formation of Origen was officially announced, with Martínez assuming the position of a player manager. In its first season as a professional team, Origen won the Europe Challenger Series title and finished second in the Summer Split of the European LCS. Martínez and Origen qualified for the Season 5 World Championship, having qualified through the regional gauntlet. At Worlds they got to the semi-finals of the playoff bracket before losing to SK Telecom T1. Overall, Martínez had the highest Creep Score (CS) of any player in the tournament.

=== Origen ===
Origen was initially founded by xPeke in December 2014 after he departed Fnatic to found his own team. Jungler "Amazing" (of Team SoloMid), support "Mithy" (formerly of Lemondogs), and rookie AD Carry "Niels" (now called "Zven") joined xPeke as he played mid lane. xPeke's former Fnatic teammate "sOAZ" joined shortly thereafter to play top lane. Origen established a base and gaming house in Tenerife in the Canary Islands of Spain in the beginnings.

In 2018 it was reported that Astralis' parent company RFRSH Entertainment had acquired Origen and would use their name and brand for their EU LCS entry as part of the 2019 European franchise program. On November 20, Riot Games confirmed Origen as one of the ten partner teams for the LEC 2019 Spring Split. xPeke stayed under the organization as an Origen ambassador and has an ownership.

== Seasons overview ==
| Year | Team | Domestic | | | Regional | International | |
| Year | Team | League | Split | | Rift Rivals | Mid-Season Invitational | World Championship |
| Year | Team | League | Spring | Summer | Rift Rivals | Mid-Season Invitational | World Championship |
|---|---|---|---|---|---|---|---|
| 2011 | Fnatic | —N/a | —N/a | —N/a | —N/a | —N/a | 1st |
| 2012 | Fnatic | —N/a | —N/a | —N/a | —N/a | —N/a | Did not qualify |
| 2013 | Fnatic | EU LCS | 1st | 1st | —N/a | —N/a | 3rd–4th |
| 2014 | Fnatic | EU LCS | 1st | 2nd | —N/a | —N/a | 12th–13th |
| 2015 | Origen | EU CS | 1st | — | —N/a | — | |
| 2015 | Origen | EU LCS | — | 2nd | —N/a | — | 3rd–4th |
| 2016 | Origen | EU LCS | 2nd | 9th | —N/a | Did not qualify | Did not qualify |
| 2017 | Origen | EU LCS | 5th | — | — | Did not qualify | — |

== Awards and honors ==
International

- One-time World champion – 2011

LEC

- Three-time LEC champion – Spring 2013, Summer 2013, Spring 2014

EU CS

- One-time EU CS champion – Spring 2015

Tournaments

- Intel Extreme Masters – Hanover 2011, New York 2011, San Jose 2015 (Note: As coach.)
- One-time Intel Extreme Masters MVP – Katowice 2013
- DreamHack Winter – 2012
- Thor Open – 2012
- RaidCall Dominance 1 – 2012
- ASUS ROG Paris Games Week – 2012
- ESL Major Series 10 – 2012
- 4Players.de All or Nothing 6 – 2012
- 4Players.de All or Nothing 4 – 2012
- League of Champions June – 2012
- Cdiscount Cup 4 – 2012
- Fight for Pride Promo – 2012
- Campus Gaming Party: Berlin – 2012
- PLAY RaidCall LoL Showmatch – 2012
- Gamers Assembly – 2015
- ESL MWC Challenge – 2015
