= 2016 EU LCS season =

- League: EU LCS
- Sport: League of Legends
- Teams: 10
- TV partner: Twitch

Spring
- Season champions: G2 Esports
- Runners-up: Origen
- Top seed: G2 Esports

Summer
- Season champions: G2 Esports
- Runners-up: Splyce
- Top seed: G2 Esports
- Season MVP: Kim "Trick" Gang-yun

EU LCS seasons
- ← 2015 2017 →

The 2016 European League of Legends Championship Series (2016 EU LCS) was the fourth season of the European League of Legends Championship Series.

The Spring Split began on January 16, with a rematch of the 2015 EU LCS Summer playoff finals. Most matches were played at a film studio in Adlershof, Berlin. The finals were played in Rotterdam, Netherlands, at the Rotterdam Ahoy.

The Summer Split was won by G2 Esports, with a roster of Expect, Trick, PerkZ, Zven, Mithy, Relinquished, Kikis, their first title. Most games were being played at Riot Games' studio in Adlershof, Berlin, Germany. The finals were at the Tauron Arena Kraków in Kraków, Poland.

== Spring ==
=== Rosters ===
| Team | Players |
| Team | ID |
|---|---|
| Elements | Steve; Gilius; Eika; MrRalleZ; sprattel; Dexter (sub); Solaaaa (sub) |
| Fnatic | Gamsu; Spirit; Febiven; Rekkles; NoXiAK; Klaj |
| G2 Esports | Kikis; Trick; PerkZ; Emperor; Hybrid; Gucioq (sub) |
| GIANTS! Gaming | SmittyJ; Maxlore; NighT; S0NSTAR; Hustlin; Samux; Special |
| H2k-Gaming | Odoamne; Jankos; Ryu; Selfie; FORG1VEN; VandeR |
| Origen | sOAZ; Amazing; PowerOfEvil; xPeke; Zven; Mithy |
| Splyce | Wunder (gamer); Trashy; Sencux; Kobbe; Nisbeth |
| ROCCAT | fredy122; Airwaks; Betsy; Safir; Tabzz; Edward (sub); extinkt (sub); NoXiAK (sub) |
| Team Vitality | Cabochard; Shook; Nukeduck; Hjärnan; kaSing |
| Unicorns of Love | Vizicsacsi; Diamondprox; Djoko; Rudy; loulex; Fox; Steelback; Hylissang |

=== Regular season ===
| Place | Team | Match record | Game record | Champ. points |
|---|---|---|---|---|
| 1. | G2 Esports | 15-3 | | |
| 2. | H2k-Gaming | 14-4 | | |
| 3. | Team Vitality | 13-5 | | |
| 4. | Origen | 11-7 | | |
| 5. | Unicorns of Love | 10-8 | | |
| 6. | Fnatic | 9-9 | | |
| 7. | Elements | 6–12 | | |
| 8. | Splyce | 5-13 | | |
| 9. | Team ROCCAT | 4-14 | | |
| 10. | GIANTS! Gaming | 3-15 | | |

=== Playoffs ===
Quarterfinals
Team Vitality | 1
Fnatic | 3
Origen | 3
Unicorns of Love | 0

Semifinals
H2k-Gaming | 2
Origen | 3
G2 Esports | 3
Fnatic | 1

Finals
Origen | 1
G2 Esports | 3
Third place
H2k-Gaming | 2
Fnatic | 3

== Summer ==
=== Rosters ===
| Team | Players | | |
| Team | ID | Name | Role |
|---|---|---|---|
| Fnatic | (Korea) Gamsu (Korea) Spirit (Netherlands) Febiven (Sweden) Rekkles (France) YellOwStaR (Spain) Werlyb (as substitute) (Sweden) Klaj (as substitute) | Noh Young-Jin; Lee Da-yoon (이다윤); Fabian Diepstraten; Martin Larsson; Bora Kim; Jorge Casanovas; Johan Olsson | Top; Jungle; Mid; AD Carry; Support; Top; Support |
| G2 Esports | (Korea) Expect (Korea) Trick (Croatia) PerkZ (Denmark) Zven (Spain) Mithy (Sweden) RelinQuished (as substitute) (Poland) Kikis (as substitute) | Dae-han Ki (대한기); Kim Kang Yoon (김강윤); Luka Perkovic; Jesper Svenningsen; Alfonso Aguirre Rodriguez; Joel Fjellström; Mateusz Szkudlarek | Top; Jungle; Mid; AD Carry; Support; AD Carry; Top |
| GIANTS! Gaming | (Germany) SmittyJ (United Kingdom) Maxlore (Korea) NighT (Korea) S0NSTAR (Sweden) Hustlin (Spain) Samux (as substitute) (Netherlands) Special (as substitute) | Lennart Warkus; Nubar Sarafian; Gun Woo Na; Son Seung-ik (손승익); Morgan Granberg; Samuel Fernández Fort; Joran Scheffer | Top; Jungle; Mid; AD Carry; Support; AD Carry; Mid |
| H2k-Gaming | (Romania) Odoamne (Poland) Jankos (Korea) Ryu (Czech Republic) Freeze (Poland) VandeR (Greece) FORG1VEN (playoffs only) (Sweden) Hulberto (as substitute) (Sweden) Knugen (as substitute) | Andrei Pascu; Marcin Jankowski; Ryu Sang-ook; Aleš Kněžínek; Oskar Bogdan; Konstantinos Tzortziou; Johan Johansson; Jesper Rundberg | Top; Jungle; Mid; AD Carry; Support; AD Carry; Jungle; AD Carry |
| Origen | (France) sOAZ (Germany) Amazing (Germany) PowerOfEvil (Spain) xPeke (Netherlands) Hybrid (Finland) Cyanide (as substitute) (Greece) FORG1VEN (as substitute) (June–August) | Paul Boyer; Maurice Stückenschneider; Tristan Schrage; Enrique Cedeño Martínez; Glenn Doornenbal; Lauri Happonen; Konstantinos Tzortziou | Top; Jungle; Mid; AD Carry; Support; Jungle; AD Carry |
| ROCCAT | (Korea) Parang (Switzerland) Airwaks (Sweden) Betsy (France) Steelback (Korea) Raise (United Kingdom) fredy122 (as substitute) (Lithuania) extinkt (as substitute) | Sang-won Lee; Karim Benghalia; Felix Edling; Pierre Medjaldi; Ji-hwan Oh; Simon Payne; Vytautas Mélinauskas | Top; Jungle; Mid; AD Carry; Support; Top; Support |
| Schalke 04 | (France) Steve (Germany) Gilius (Sweden) Fox (Denmark) MrRalleZ (Sweden) sprattel (Germany) Dexter (as substitute) (Germany) Solaaaa (as substitute) | Etienne Michels; Berk Demir; Hampus Myhre; Rasmus Skinneholm; Hampus Abrahamsson; Marcel Feldkamp; Nico Linke | Top; Jungler; Mid; AD Carry; Support; Jungle; AD Carry |
| Splyce | (Denmark) Wunderwear (Denmark) Trashy (Denmark) Sencux (Denmark) Kobbe (Slovenia) Mikyx (Denmark) Gripex (as substitute) (Netherlands) Vizility (as substitute) | Martin Hansen; Jonas Andersen; Chres Laursen; Kasper Kobberup; Mihael Mehle; Jesper Terkildsen; Jeffrey de Vries | Top; Jungle; Mid; AD Carry; Support; Jungle; AD Carry |
| Unicorns of Love | (Hungary) Vizicsacsi (Korea) Move (Germany) Exileh (Korea) Veritas (Bulgaria) Hylissang | Kiss Tamás; Kang Min-su; Fabian Schubert; Kim Kyoung-min; Zdravets Galabov | Top; Jungle; Mid; AD Carry; Support |

=== Regular season ===
| Place | Team | Match record | Points |
|---|---|---|---|
| 1. | G2 Esports | 10W-8T-0L | 38 |
| 2. | Splyce | 9W-6T-3L | 33 |
| 3. | Giants Gaming | 8W-3T-7L | 27 |
| 4. | H2k-Gaming | 7W-6T-5L | 27 |
| 5. | Fnatic | 7W-6T-5L | 27 |
| 6. | Unicorns of Love | 6W-5T-7L | 23 |
| 7. | Team Vitality | 3W-9T-6L | 18 |
| 8. | FC Schalke 04 | 3W-9T-6L | 18 |
| 9. | Origen | 2W-8T-8L | 14 |
| 10. | ROCCAT | 2W-6T-10L | 12 |

H2k finished above Fnatic after defeating them in a tiebreaker game

Team Vitality finished above Schalke 04 after defeating them in a tiebreaker game

=== Playoffs ===
The semi-finals match between fnatic and H2k was delayed two days due to technical reasons.

Quarterfinals
3 | Giants Gaming | 1
6 | Unicorns of Love | 3
4 | H2k-Gaming | 3
5 | fnatic | 0

Semifinals
1 | G2 Esports | 3
6 | Unicorns of Love | 1
2 | Splyce | 3
4 | H2k-Gaming | 2

Finals
1 | G2 Esports | 3
2 | Splyce | 1
Third place
6 | Unicorns of Love | 1
4 | H2k-Gaming | 3

== EU Regional Qualifiers ==
Quarterfinals
3 | Unicorns of Love | 3
4 | Giants Gaming | 0

Semifinals
2 | Fnatic | 0
3 | Unicorns of Love | 3

Final
1 | Splyce | 3
3 | Unicorns of Love | 2
