= YellOwStaR =

French League of Legends player and coach

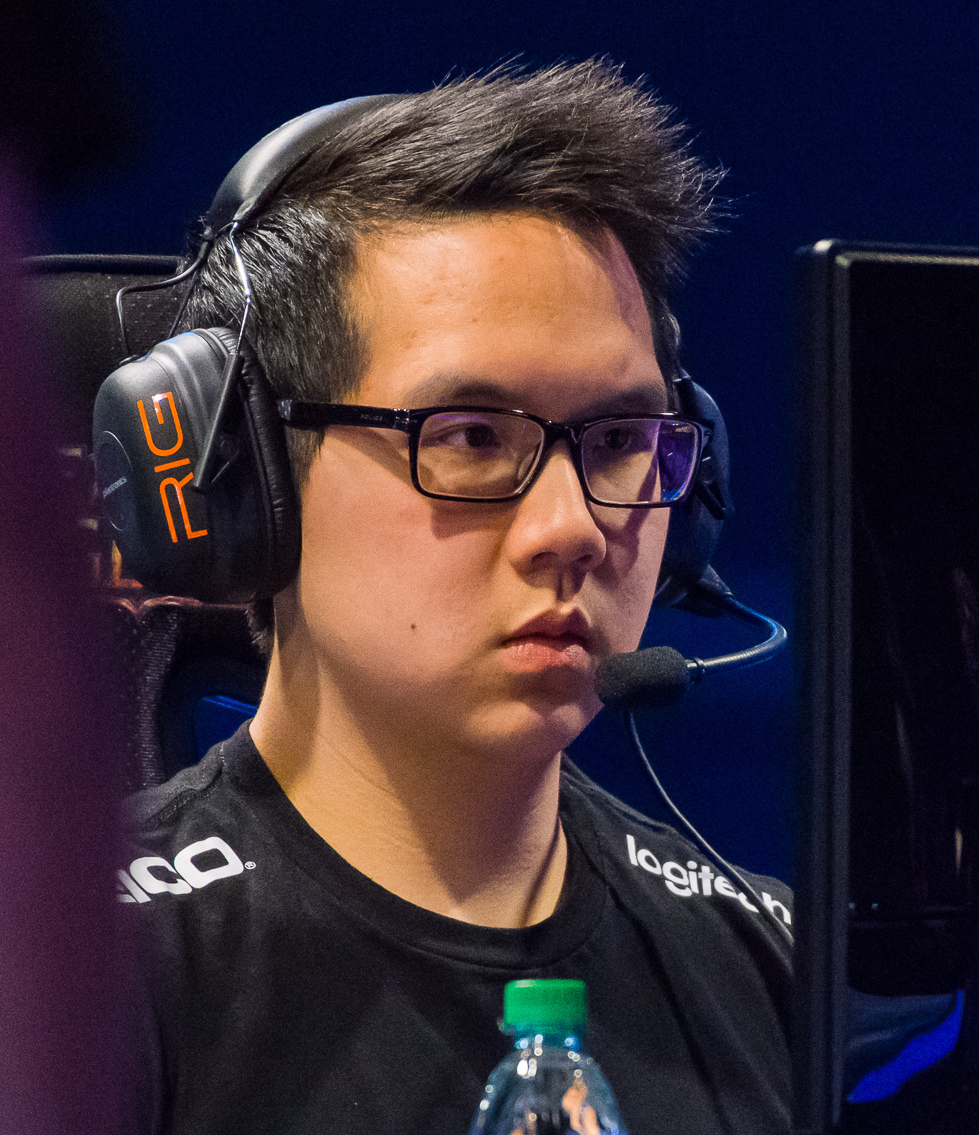
- Kim at the 2016 NA LCS Finals

Personal information
- Name: Bora Kim
- Born: 15 February 1992 (age 34)
- Nationality: French

Current team
- Team: LDLC OL
- Role: Support; Former: Bot Laner, Top Laner
- Game: League of Legends
- League: La Ligue Française (LFL)

Team history

As player:
- 2010–2011: against All authority
- 2011: Millenium
- 2011–2012: against All authority
- 2012: Millenium
- 2012: SK Gaming
- 2013–2015: Fnatic
- 2015–2016: Team SoloMid
- 2016: Fnatic
- 2020–present: LDLC OL

As coach:
- 2016–2017: PSG Esports
- 2017–2020: Team-LDLC

Bora Kim (born 15 February 1992), better known as YellOwStaR, is a French professional League of Legends player and coach. He has played and coached for several teams throughout his career, including Fnatic, SK Gaming, PSG Esports, against All authority, and Team SoloMid. YellOwStaR announced his retirement from professional play on 20 October 2016, but later announced his return on 13 January 2020 as a support for LDLC OL.

== Career ==
=== 2011 ===
YellOwStaR first joined the professional League of Legends scene after being picked up to play for eSports organization, Against All Authority in September 2010. They were able to compete and make a name for themselves at the IEM Season V - LoL Invitational in Germany, placing 2nd after losing to team MyRevenge. YellOwStaR and his team then went on to play at the biggest event of the time, the Riot Season 1 Championship in June 2011 at DreamHack Summer 2011. They were able to make it out of groups after a relegation match to advance, beating Team gamed!de. In the semifinals, YellOwStaR and aAa fought against the American powerhouse Team SoloMid, and were able to best the US players and advance to the winner finals bracket. Facing off against the familiar lineup of MyRevenge, now called Fnatic, aAa were unable take 1st, losing 2-0. They then went up again, against Team SoloMid to determine 2nd place, where they again defeated the American team, taking silver in the tournament.

After the championship, YellOwStaR with several of his teammates left aAa to join the new team Millenium. He played in few major tournaments, such as IEM Season VI - Global Challenge Cologne where they placed 4th, but left the team to rejoin a reformed aAa.

=== 2012 ===
YellOwStaR's team played in IEM Season VI - Global Challenge Kiev January 2011. At this event, against All authority would place third in Group B, going 1-2 by defeating Sypher, then falling to Moscow Five and Team Dignitas. As they were unable to reach top two in their respective group, aAa was eliminated after the group stage, going home with a 5th-6th-place finish. Their next premier tournament performance occurred at the IEM Season VI - World Championship, where they would make it out of the group stage, to win against SK Gaming then lose versus American teams Team Dignitas and Counter Logic Gaming, eventually taking 4th at the event. Tension and rocky performances at tournaments in the months after, led to YellOwStar and his bot lane support partner, nRated, leaving aAa and rejoining Millenium in June 2012 for a test period. The bot lane for the team was short lived as both players decided to leave the team after their testing period was due, with YellOwStaR going to play for long established European organization, SK Gaming. His first event with the team was European Challenger Circuit: Poland where they made it past groups, but lost their match against CLG EU but were able to best Team Curse EU to achieve 3rd in the tournament. YellOwStaR and his team were granted a huge opportunity to play in the Season Two Regional Finals held in Cologne where the top 3 placing teams would be flown to Los Angeles for the Season 2 World Championship for a chance to play for a $1,000,000 grand prize. SK went an undefeated 4-0, winning a spot in the finals, besting Team Acer Poland and CLG Europe. They faced the fairly new team Moscow Five who had been dominant in tournaments since emergence. YellOwStaR and his team were unable to take a game in the set, ending 2-0, but still placed 2nd overall and earned a spot for the trip to Los Angeles.

The Season 2 World Championship was held in October 2012. The event proved to be a disappointment, as they went a winless 0-3 in groups, going home with an 11th-12th placing.

After finding success with SK, YellOwStaR departed the team in December 2012 and was quickly picked up by Fnatic as their AD, reuniting with old teammates, nRated and sOAZ. In January 2013, his new team had a chance to participate in Riot's new competitive league for the upcoming Season 3 for NA and EU, the Riot League of Legends Championship Series (LCS), but they had to play for a spot at the Season 3 Europe Offline Qualifier; which he actually had already qualified to play in, when he was with SK Gaming. Fighting out of the group stage and into the quarterfinals, the new crew were able to best MeetYourMakers in a 2-0 set, to win a spot in the league.

=== 2013 ===
Fnatic competed in the 2013 EU League of Legends Championship Series (LCS) Spring Split, finishing the regular season with a 22–6 record. The team qualified for the Spring Playoffs, where they defeated Evil Geniuses 2–1 in the semifinals and Gambit Gaming 3–2 in the final, winning the championship and the $50,000 first-place prize.

YellOwStaR and Fnatic later qualified for the Season 3 World Championship after winning the Summer Playoffs. Fnatic finished first in their group and defeated Cloud9 in the quarterfinals before losing to Royal Club in the semifinals.

=== 2014 ===
YellOwStaR and Fnatic started off their season at the IEM Season VIII - World Championship. The team finished 2nd, losing to KT Rolster Bullets in the Grand Final. The Spring Split went relatively well for YellOwStaR and the team. A tight split saw YellOwStaR perform on a range of champions including Morgana, Annie, and Karma in particular. Fnatic ended the split in 2nd place behind SK Gaming, securing themselves a place in the Spring Playoffs. The whole team raised their game for the playoffs, and they emerged victorious after a win against Alliance in their semifinal matchup, and another against SK Gaming in the Grand Final. Due to Fnatic's performance in the Spring Playoffs, they had qualified to compete at All-Star Paris 2014, along with other regional winners from around the world. The team made it to the semifinals of the tournament, losing only to the world champions at the time, SK Telecom T1 K. The start of the Summer Split was shaky for YellOwStaR and the team. Fnatic could not break into the top 2 until Week 7 of the split, at which point their main rivals Alliance were already a considerable distance ahead of them in the race for 1st place. YellOwStaR managed to impress with his Thresh and Morgana throughout, picking up the Weekly MVP Award for Week 7, but Fnatic could only manage a 2nd-place finish. His performances on these champions also contributed to YellOwStaR picking up the MVP Award for the entire split. The team aimed to put the split behind them and focus on the Summer Playoffs. A close fought win over ROCCAT in the semifinal meant that YellOwStaR and the team would face Alliance in the final. The match ended in defeat for Fnatic, but the playoffs saw the team seal their qualification for the 2014 Season World Championship. The World Championship saw Fnatic placed in Group C with Samsung Blue, OMG, and LMQ. The team were only able to win 2 matches out of 6 in their group, meaning that they would go no further in the tournament.

=== 2015 ===
After being invited to the tournament, the departures of Rekkles, xPeke, and Cyanide meant that Fnatic and YellOwStaR would not be able to compete at IEM Season IX - Cologne. YellOwStaR and Fnatic's new roster had a successful Spring Split, finishing 2nd in the regular season with a 13-5 record, partly thanks to YellOwStaR's impressive performances on Janna and Annie among other champions. This secured them a bye to the semifinals of the Spring Playoffs. Fnatic beat H2k-Gaming in their semifinal matchup, and went on to secure 1st place after taking a 3-2 win over Unicorns Of Love in the playoff final. This meant that YellOwStaR and the team would pick up 90 Championship Points towards qualification for the 2015 Season World Championship. This also meant that Fnatic would represent Europe at the 2015 Mid-Season Invitational. YellOwStaR and the team had a relatively successful tournament, which they opened with a decisive win over Team SoloMid. The team also had a notably close group stage game with SK Telecom T1, but went on to lose the game. Fnatic finished the group stage in 4th place, meaning they would advance to the bracket stage. They faced SK Telecom T1 in the semifinals, this time playing out a close series, but ultimately losing 3-2. Now with Rekkles on the roster instead of Steeelback, YellOwStaR and the team went into the Summer Season with confidence running high after their performance on the international stage. Fnatic managed to finish the regular season with a perfect, unbeaten 18-0 record - and became the first team to achieve this in League Championship Series history. This meant a 1st place regular season finish for the team and a bye to the semifinals of the Summer Playoffs. Fnatic went on to win the playoffs, beating Origen 3-2 in a tight final. This qualified the team for the 2015 World Championship, where they would compete as Europe's #1 seed. At the 2015 League of Legends World Championship, Fnatic were seeded into Group B along with ahq e-Sports Club, Invictus Gaming, and Cloud9. They picked up 4 wins in the group, going unbeaten in the 2nd week of group stage games, meaning they would advance to the knockout stage of the tournament. In the quarterfinals, Fnatic beat EDward Gaming 3-0 before suffering a 3-0 loss to KOO Tigers in the semifinals, putting an end to their campaign.

On 1 December 2015, it was announced that YellOwStaR would be leaving Fnatic as well as moving to the North American LCS. On December he joined Team SoloMid as their support player.

=== 2016 ===
On 21 April 2016, TSM announced that after the Spring Split playoffs, YellOwStaR had expressed a desire to return to Europe for the remainder of the season and would no longer be a starting player on the team.

On 20 October 2016, YellOwStaR announced on a lengthy Facebook post that he has retired from his professional gaming career.

== Tournaments results ==
2015
| Date | Event | Placement | Final game | | |
|---|---|---|---|---|---|
| October 2015 | 2015 World Championship | 3rd–4th | Fnatic | 0–3 | KOO Tigers |
| 22 November 2015 | Intel Extreme Masters Season X - San Jose | 3rd–4th | Team SoloMid | 0–2 | Origen |

- 1st — 2016 Summer NA LCS
- 1st — 2016 Summer NA LCS playoffs
