= Intel Extreme Masters Season X – World Championship =

Intel Extreme Masters Season X – World Championship Katowice
- 2016

Tournament information
- Sport: League of Legends
- Location: Katowice, Silesian Voivodeship, Poland
- Administrator: Electronic Sports League
- Venue(s): Spodek
- Teams: Eight teams

Final positions
- Champions: SK Telecom T1 (Duke, Blank, Faker, Bang, Wolf)
- 1st runners-up: Fnatic (Gamsu, Spirit, Febiven, Rekkles, Klaj)
- 2nd runners-up: Royal Never Give Up (Looper, Mlxg, Xiaohu, Wuxx, Mata)

Intel Extreme Masters Season X – World Championship Katowice
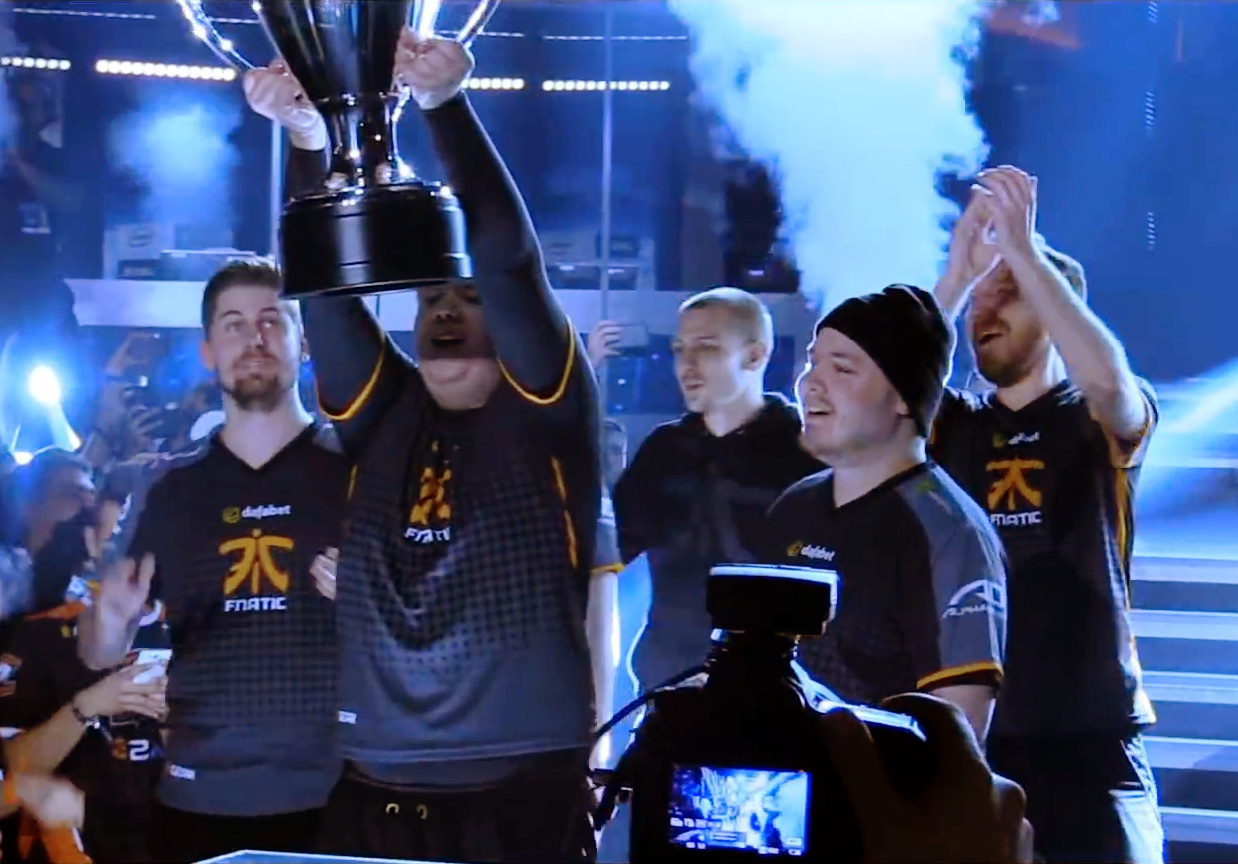
- Fnatic

Tournament information
- Sport: Counter-Strike: Global Offensive
- Location: Katowice, Silesian Voivodeship, Poland
- Administrator: Electronic Sports League
- Venue(s): Spodek

Final positions
- Champions: Fnatic (Olofmeister, JW, flusha, krimz, dennis)
- Runner-up: Luminosity Gaming

The Intel Extreme Masters Season X – World Championship or IEM Season X – Katowice was the world championship for the tenth season of the Intel Extreme Masters. It was held at the Spodek in Katowice, Silesian Voivodeship, Poland from March 2–6, 2016.

The Counter-Strike: Global Offensive portion was won by fnatic 3–0 with a roster consisting of Olofmeister, JW, flusha, krimz, and dennis against Luminosity Gaming.

League of Legends was won by SK Telecom T1 against fnatic. Both organizations had teams in both grand finals.

== Counter-Strike: Global Offensive ==
=== Final standings ===
Place	Team	Prize money
1st	Fnatic	$104,000
2nd	Luminosity Gaming	$44,000
3rd–4th	Astralis	$25,000
3rd–4th	Natus Vincere	$23,000
5th–6th	Tempo Storm	$13,000
5th–6th	Virtus.pro	$13,000
7th–8th	mousesports	$7,000
7th–8th	FaZe Clan	$7,000
9th–10th	Ninjas in Pyjamas	$5,000
9th-10th	E-Frag.net Esports Club	$4,000
11th–12th	Team EnVyUs	$3,000
11th–12th	The MongolZ	$2,000

== League of Legends ==
=== Final standings ===
Place	Team	Prize money
1st	SK Telecom T1	$50,000
2nd	Fnatic	$20,000
3rd–4th	Team SoloMid	$10,000
3rd–4th	Royal Never Give Up	$10,000
5th–6th	Ever	$3,500
5th–6th	Qiao Gu Reapers	$3,500
7th–8th	Origen	$1,500
7th–8th	Counter Logic Gaming	$1,500
