= Amazing (gamer) =

German professional League of Legends player and coach

- Amazing at the 2015 League of Legends World Championship

Personal information
- Name: Maurice Stückenschneider
- Born: 1993 or 1994 (age 31–32)
- Nationality: German

Current team
- Team: Misfits Gaming
- Role: Coach
- Game: League of Legends
- League: LEC

Career information
- Playing career: 2012–present
- Role: Jungler
- Coaching career: 2019–2020

Team history

As player:
- 2012: Absolute Legends.Alpha
- 2012–2013: Team Acer
- 2013: peculiar gaming
- 2013: against All authority
- 2013–2014: Copenhagen Wolves
- 2014: Team SoloMid
- 2014–2016: Origen
- 2016–2017: Fnatic
- 2017: Mysterious Monkeys
- 2018: FC Schalke 04
- 2019: 100 Thieves
- 2019: Mouz
- 2023–present: Bethany Lutheran College

As coach:
- 2018–2019: FC Schalke 04
- 2019–2020: Misfits Gaming

Career highlights and awards
- NA LCS champion (2014 Summer)

Maurice Stückenschneider (born 2 April 1994), better known by his in-game name Amazing, is a German professional League of Legends player and coach. He is currently a coach for Misfits Gaming of the League of Legends European Championship (LEC). Amazing was a semifinalist at the 2015 World Championship while on Origen. Stückenschneider has been called "one of the most successful German League of Legends players of all time."

== Playing career ==
Primarily using Udyr, Shyvana and Lee Sin, Amazing rose through the ranks and peaked at 2.8k Elo in Season 2. His progression drew notice from many teams, the most notable at the time being LCS Season 3 Qualifier participant Team Acer. A string of failed attempts to qualify for the LCS almost caused him to retire, but Shook's defection to Alliance allowed him to settle in one more team, the Copenhagen Wolves.

=== 2014 ===
It was with Copenhagen Wolves that Amazing finally reached the LCS. The Spring Split proved to be the break he needed, and he gained a reputation for his high mechanics and proficiency on Lee Sin, Elise, and Evelynn. However, even with Amazing's two-time weekly MVP performance, the team overall didn't see much success, and they were forced into relegations. After defeating Denial eSports.Europe in the Summer Promotion Tournament, Amazing left Copenhagen Wolves.

On 3 May 2014, Team Solomid announced that they had acquired Amazing and that TheOddOne had stepped down from the starting jungle position. Showing great synergy with Bjergsen, he immediately made an impact with the squad, but he saw criticism in his small champion pool. Despite this criticism, the Summer Split, his first split in the NA LCS, was a success for both him and TSM. Amazing was named weekly MVP in the 4th Week and the team finished 3rd overall. Inspired performances by Amazing and the team saw TSM place 1st at the Summer Playoffs, securing themselves a spot at the World Championship.

TSM were placed in Group B with Star Horn Royal Club, SK Gaming and Taipei Assassins. Amazing and the team secured four wins in the group, placing 2nd-place finish behind SHRC, and earning a spot in the quarterfinals. There they faced eventual winners Samsung White at this stage, and went out after only taking a single game off the Korean team in the best-of-5 series.

On 11 October 2014, it was announced that he was stepping down from the TSM roster in order to return home to Europe. Amazing cited personal reasons for leaving the team.

On 17 December 2014, it was announced that Amazing, mithy, and Niels had joined Origen along with former Fnatic players xPeke and eventually sOAZ.

=== 2015 ===
Origen qualified for the EUCS Spring Qualifier via the Challenger Ladder, where they beat Millenium Spirit in their bracket final, securing their qualification to the EUCS Spring Season. Origen were unbeaten until their penultimate game of the split, against LowLandLions.White, and despite dropping that one game easily secured first place in the regular season. Origen also placed highly in tournaments throughout this period, winning the ESL MWC Challenge and Gamers Assembly 2015. The Spring Playoffs saw Origen beat Reason Gaming in the semifinals 2-1 and then going on to sweep Copenhagen Wolves Academy (the team formerly known as LowLandLions.White) in the final to win the tournament and secure automatic qualification to the LCS Summer Season.

Throughout the EU LCS Summer Season, Origen jostled for 2nd position with H2k-Gaming, while Fnatic sat far ahead in an undefeated 1st place throughout. Impressive individual performances including Amazing's Gragas helped the team to a 2nd place regular season finish, and with it a bye past the Summer Playoffs quarterfinal round. In the semifinals, Origen faced off against rivals H2k and won 3–1; perhaps even more impressively, they took two games off Fnatic in the finals despite ultimately losing the series. Their second-place overall finish earned Origen 90 Championship Points, enough for the second seed in the 2015 Season Europe Regional Finals. There, they beat Team ROCCAT in a 3–2 series and then Unicorns of Love in an easy 3-0 and qualified for the 2015 World Championship, where they would play as Europe's #3 seed.

At the 2015 World Championship, Origen were drawn into Group D along with Team SoloMid, KT Rolster, and LGD Gaming. Origen went 3–0 in the 1st week of the round robin and ended the group with a 4–2 record, meaning they would advance to the knockout stage of the tournament. Origen won their quarterfinal series 3–1 against the Flash Wolves, becoming the first Western team to win a best-of-five at a World Championship, but were later knocked out by SK Telecom T1 in the semifinals.

=== 2016 ===
Origen and Amazing competed at IEM San Jose, and were given a bye to the semifinals due to Fnatic's withdrawal from the tournament. The team fielded their roster from the previous season, but with PowerOfEvil in the mid lane and xPeke taking a coaching role. They took down Team SoloMid in the semifinals, and went on to beat Counter Logic Gaming in the final - winning the tournament without losing a single game.

Origen's performance at IEM San Jose resulted in their qualification to the IEM World Championship. At the tournament, they first lost to Royal Never Give Up in the upper bracket of their group before then losing to Team SoloMid in the lower bracket, resulting in the team's elimination from the tournament.

Amazing and sOAZ left Origen on 11 November 2016.

== Coaching career ==
Stückenschneider signed with FC Schalke 04 Esports as the team's strategic manager in December 2018; he was promoted coach in January 2019. In December 2019, Stückenschneider signed with Misfits Gaming as the team's new League of Legends strategic coach.

== Tournament results ==
=== Team SoloMid ===
- 1st — 2014 Summer NA LCS playoffs

=== Origen ===
- 2nd — 2015 EU LCS Summer
- 3rd–4th — 2015 League of Legends World Championship
- 2nd — 2016 EU LCS Spring
- 1st — IEM X San Jose
- 9th — 2016 Summer EU LCS regular season
