= Chres =

Danish League of Legends player

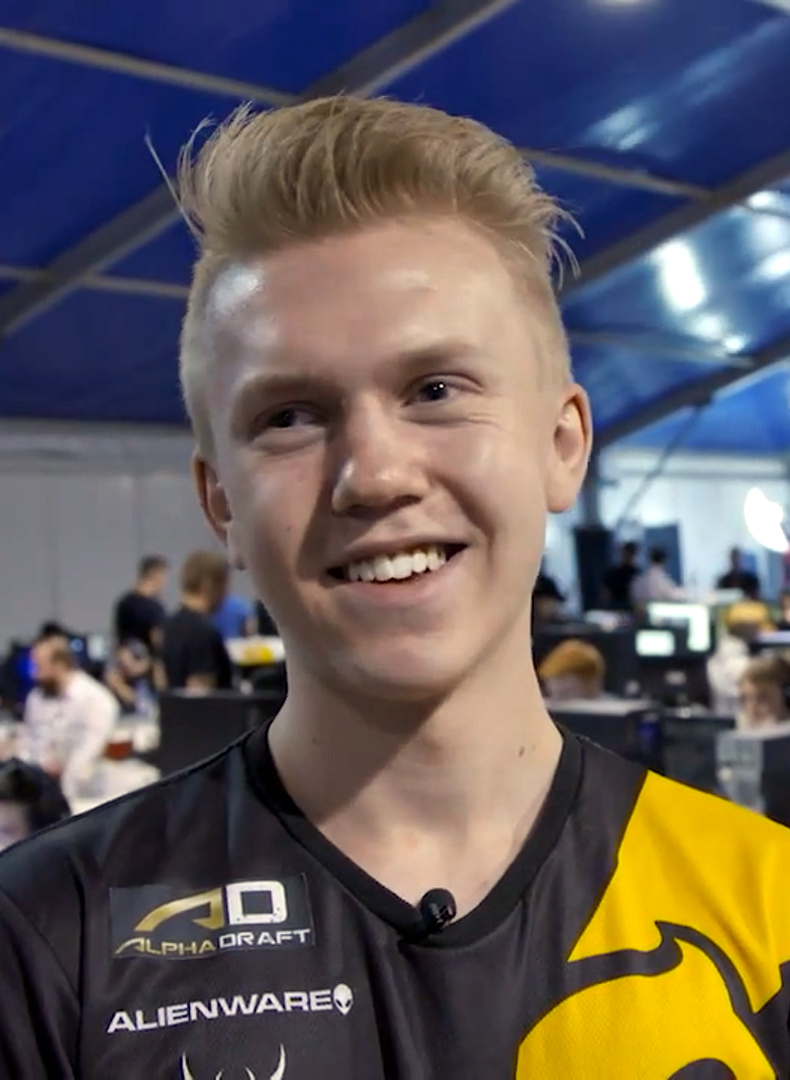
- Laursen in 2015

Personal information
- Name: Chres Laursen
- Nationality: Danish

Current team
- Team: AGO Rogue
- Role: Mid Laner
- Game: League of Legends
- League: Ultraliga

Team history
- 2014: Reason Gaming
- 2014: 4everzenzyg
- 2015: Team Dignitas EU
- 2016–2017: Splyce
- 2018: Misfits Gaming
- 2019: Rogue
- 2019: ROG Esport
- 2020: Gambit Esports
- 2020: Riddle Esports
- 2020: Barrage Esports
- 2021–present: AGO Rogue

Chres Laursen, better known simply as Chres and by his previous in-game name Sencux, is a professional Danish League of Legends player. He is the mid laner for AGO Rogue of the Ultraliga, the top-level league for professional League of Legends players in Poland. Chres previously played for LCL team Gambit Esports, and EU LCS teams Splyce and Misfits Gaming.

== Career ==
Sencux was considered an up-and-coming talent prior to his EU LCS debut, but had to wait a year before he met the league's age requirement. He joined Splyce after Team Dignitas EU was purchased by Follow eSports for over $1 mil USD. Splyce finished 7th in the 2016 Spring EU LCS and survive relegation by winning the promotion match.

== Tournament results ==
=== Team Dignitas EU ===
- 1st — 2015 EU CS Summer Playoffs

=== Splyce ===
- 2nd — 2016 EU LCS Summer regular season
