= KaSing =

British League of Legends player

Kasing
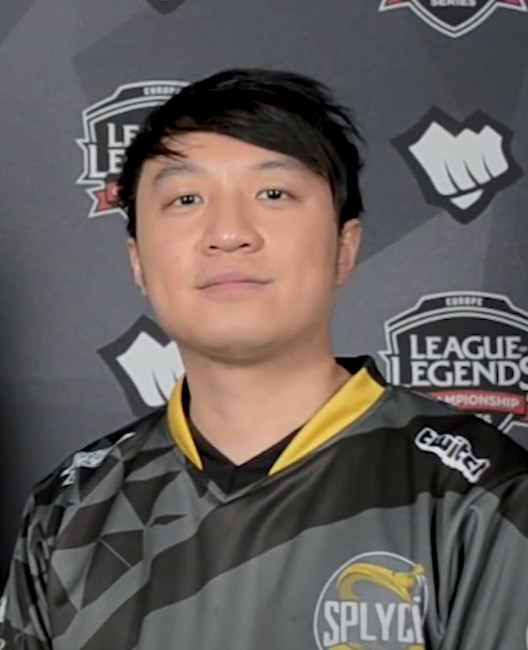
- Tsang in 2018

Personal information
- Name: Raymond Tsang
- Nationality: United Kingdom

Current team
- Team: Bulldog Esports
- Role: Support
- League: NLC

Team history
- 2012: H2k-Gaming
- 2012–2013: Enemy eSports
- 2013: myRevenge
- 2013: Dexter is actually evil
- 2013: British Tea Time
- 2013–2014: Team Dignitas UK
- 2014: Steve Bakes Cookies
- 2014: RoughNeX
- 2014: SUPA HOT CREW
- 2014–2015: Gamers2
- 2015: H2k-Gaming
- 2015: Team SoloMid
- 2015–2016: Team Vitality
- 2017: Red Bulls
- 2017–2018: Splyce
- 2018–2019: Excel Esports
- 2019–2020: Excel UK

Raymond Ka-sing Tsang (Chinese: 曾家星; Jyutping: Zang1 Gaa1 Sing1), known mononymously as Kasing, is a British professional League of Legends player who is the support for Bulldog Esports in the Northern League of Legends Championship.

== Career ==
Kasing joined H2k-Gaming ahead of the 2015 Spring EU LCS. KaSing joined TSM of the League of Legends Championship Series North America as the support and debuted with TSM at Intel Extreme Masters Season X – San Jose. He left after disappointing results from IEM San Jose and was replaced by former Fnatic player Bora "YellowStar" Kim. Soon afterwards, Kasing was picked up by Team Vitality upon the organization's buying of Gambit Gaming's EU LCS spot.

== Tournament results ==
=== Team Vitality ===
- 3rd — 2016 EU LCS Spring Split
- 5–6th — 2016 EU LCS Spring Playoffs
