= List of Shanghai Dragons (esports) players =

The Shanghai Dragons were a Chinese esports team founded in 2017 that competed in the Overwatch League (OWL). The Dragons began playing competitive Overwatch in the 2018 season.

All rostered players during the OWL season (including the playoffs) are included, even if they did not make an appearance.

== All-time roster ==
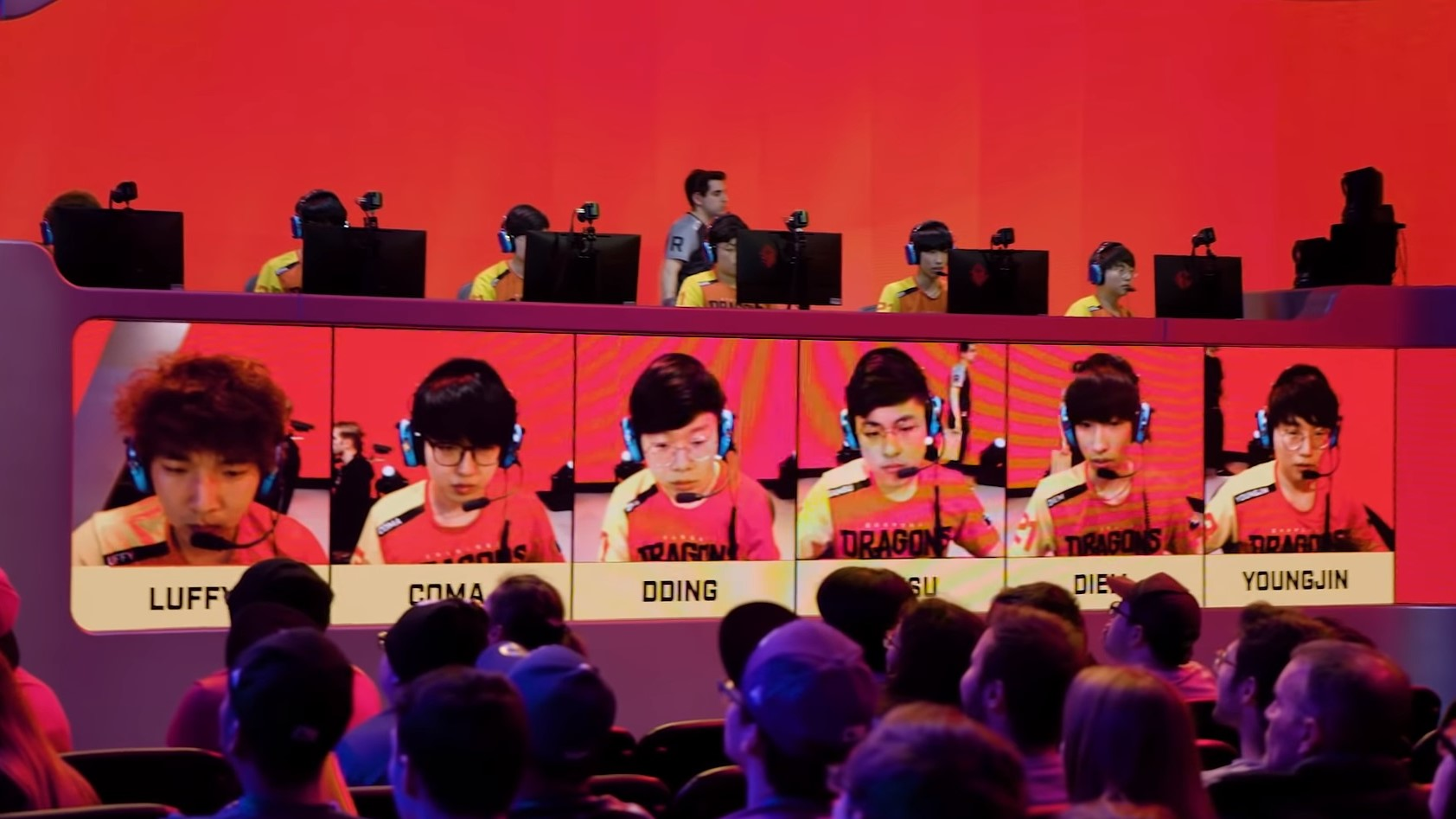
Shanghai Dragons players during a match in 2019.

As of October 9, 2023

| Handle | Name | Role | Country | Seasons | Ref. |
|---|---|---|---|---|---|
| Ado | Gihyeon Chon | Damage | South Korea | 2018 | |
| Altering | Yage Cheng | Support | China | 2018 | |
| BeBe | Yoon Hee-chang | Support | South Korea | 2022, 2023 | |
| CoMa | Kyungwoo Son | Support | South Korea | 2019 | |
| Daemin | Daemin Kim | Damage | South Korea | 2018 | |
| DDing | Jinhyeok Yang | Damage | South Korea | 2019–2020 | |
| Develop | Chae Rak-hoon | Damage | South Korea | 2021 | |
| diem | Minseong Bae | Damage, Support | South Korea | 2019–2021, 2023 | |
| Diya | Weida Lu | Damage | China | 2018–2020 | |
| envy | Lee Kang-jae | Tank | South Korea | 2019 | |
| Erster | Joon Jeong | Damage | South Korea | 2021 | |
| Fate | Pan-seung Koo | Tank | South Korea | 2021–2022, 2023 | |
| Fearless | Euiseok Lee | Tank | South Korea | 2018–2019, 2020 | |
| Fiveking | Zhaoyu Chen | Support | China | 2018 | |
| Fleta | Kim Byung-sun | Damage, Tank | South Korea | 2020–2022, 2023 | |
| Freefeel | Peixuan Xu | Support | China | 2018 | |
| Gamsu | Noh Yeong-Jin | Tank | South Korea | 2019 | |
| Gangnamjin | Kang Nam-jin | Support | South Korea | 2023 | |
| Geguri | Kim Se-yeon | Tank | South Korea | 2018–2020 | |
| GuardiaN | Junhwan Jo | Tank | South Korea | 2019 | |
| Heesu | Jeong Hee-su | DPS | South Korea | 2023 | |
| Ir1s | Kim Seung-hyun | Support | South Korea | 2023 | |
| Izayaki | Kim Min-chul | Support | South Korea | 2019–2022 | |
| LeeJaeGon | Lee Jae-gon | Support | South Korea | 2020–2022 | |
| LIP | Lee Jae-won | Damage | South Korea | 2020–2022 | |
| Luffy | Seonghyeon Yang | Support | South Korea | 2019–2020 | |
| MG | Dongjian Wu | Tank | China | 2018 | |
| Molly | Chengzhi He | Support | China | 2021–2022 | |
| Roshan | Wenhao Jing | Tank | China | 2018 | |
| Sky | Junjian He | Support | China | 2018 | |
| Stand1 | Seo Ji-won | Tank | South Korea | 2020 | |
| Undead | Chao Fang | Damage | China | 2018 | |
| Viper | Lee Jung-woong | DPS | South Korea | 2023 | |
| Void | Kang Jun-woo | Tank | South Korea | 2020–2022 | |
| WhoRU | Seungjun Lee | Damage | South Korea | 2021–2022 | |
| Xushu | Junjie Liu | Tank | China | 2018 | |
| YOUNGJIN | Youngjin Jin | Damage | South Korea | 2019 | |
