= Soaz =

Soaz may refer to

- Soaz (poetry), an elegiac poem
- Soaz (gamer), professional gamer]
- SOAz (drug), Pentazirinocyclodiphosphathiazene.
- Special Olympics Arizona, Arizona branch of the Special Olympics
- Soazza, a municipality in the Swiss canton of Graubünden
