= Spirit (gamer) =

Korean professional esports player

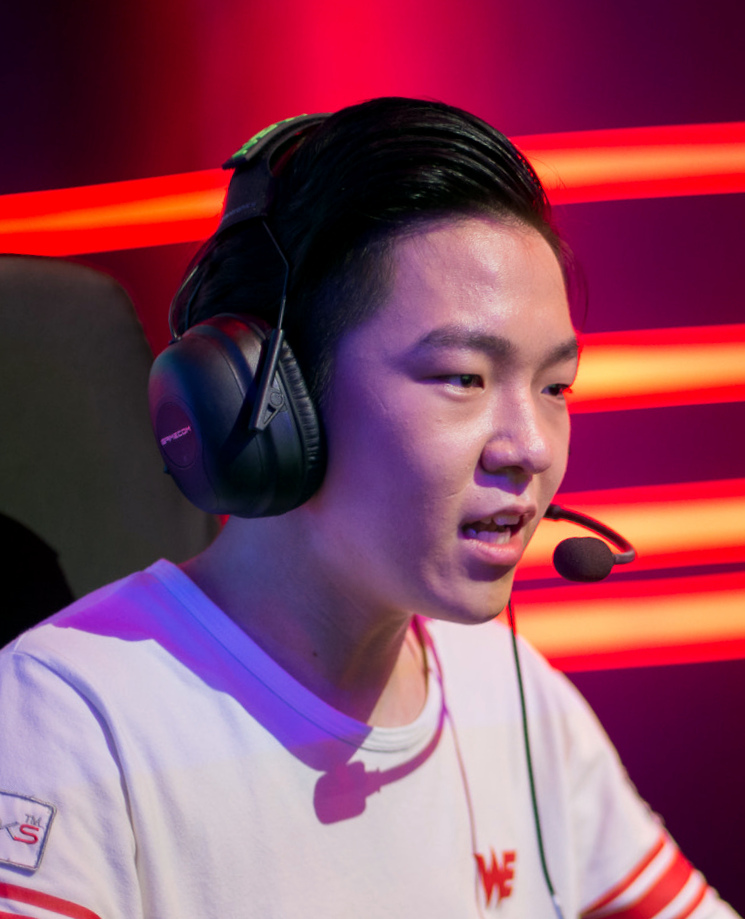
- Lee in 2015

Personal information
- Name: Lee Da-yoon
- Nationality: Republic of Korea

Current team
- Team: Afreeca Freecs Academy
- Role: Jungler
- Game: League of Legends
- League: LCK Challengers League

Team history
- 2013: MVP Blue
- 2014: Samsung Galaxy Blue
- 2015: Team WE
- 2016: Fnatic
- 2017–2020: Afreeca Freecs
- 2021–present: Afreeca Freecs Academy

Lee Da-yoon (Korean: 이다윤), better known as Spirit, is a Korean League of Legends player who is currently the jungler for the Afreeca Freecs in the LCK. Spirit has previously played for was Fnatic of the European League of Legends Championship Series (EU LCS). He has also played for MVP Blue, Samsung Galaxy Blue, and Team WE. Spirit joined fnatic on December 6, 2015 along with Noh “Gamsu” Yeong-jin.

Spirit left Fnatic on September 28, 2016 and returned to Korea, signing for the Afreeca Freecs after FNC failed to qualify for the 2016 League of Legends World Championship.

== Tournament results ==
=== Samsung Blue ===
- 3-4th - 2014 League of Legends World Championship

=== Fnatic ===
- 2nd — Intel Extreme Masters Season X – World Championship
- 3rd — 2016 EU LCS Spring playoffs
- 5th — 2016 Summer EU LCS
- ? — 2016 Summer EU LCS playoffs
