= Trick (gamer) =

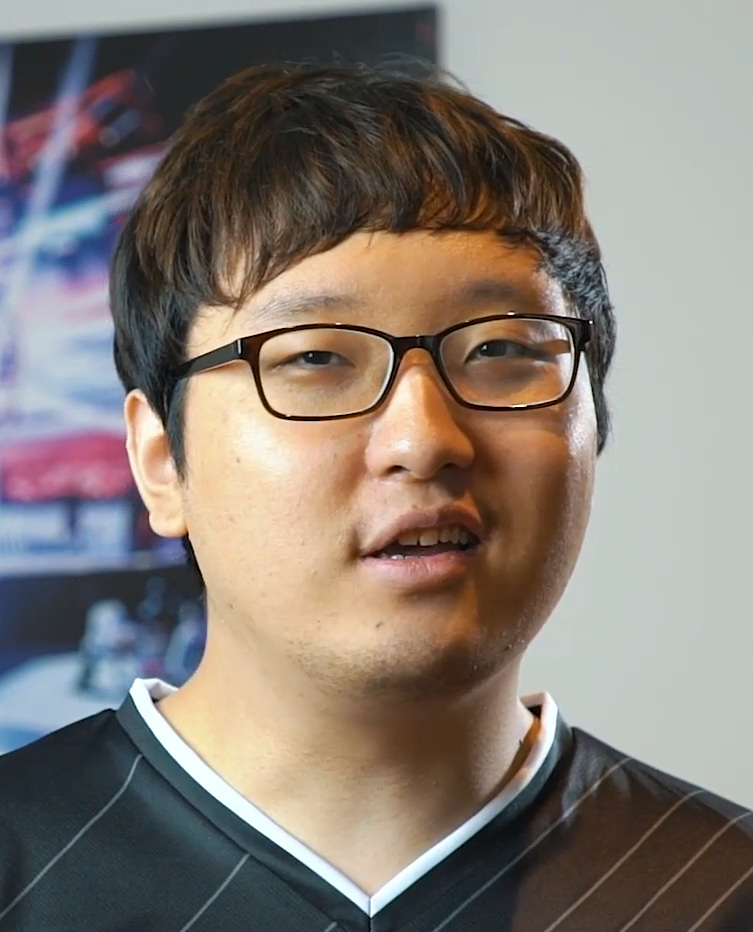
- Kim in 2017

Personal information
- Name: 김강윤 (Kim Gang-yun)
- Born: 1995 or 1996 (age 30–31)
- Nationality: South Korean

Career information
- Game: League of Legends
- Playing career: 2014–2023
- Role: Jungler
- Coaching career: 2024–present

Team history

As player:
- 2014: VTG 2
- 2014–2015: CJ Entus
- 2016–2017: G2 Esports
- 2018: bbq Olivers
- 2019: Galakticos
- 2019: Schalke 04 Esports
- 2020: SK Gaming
- 2023: Los Grandes

As coach:
- 2024: GIANTX (strategic)
- 2024: GIANTX PRIDE
- 2025: Rogue (assistant)
- 2025: Natus Vincere (assistant)

Career highlights and awards
- 4× EU LCS champion; 2x EU LCS Split MVP; 3x EU LCS 1st All-Pro Team

Kim Gang-yun (Korean: 김강윤), better known by his in-game name Trick, is a South Korean retired professional League of Legends player. He won the 2016 Spring EU LCS and 2016 Summer EU LCS while on G2 Esports; in the latter he earned the split MVP award. He also competed with FC Schalke 04 Esports and SK Gaming of the League of Legends European Championship (LEC).

== Career ==
Kim joined CJ Entus as a jungle substitute in December 2014. He played his first game in July 2015 against SBENU Sonicboom during SBENU Champions Summer 2015. He is currently a substitute for Ambition. CJ Entus placed third in the regular season but lost 3–0 to the KOO Tigers in the second round of playoffs. CJ had enough circuit points to qualify for the 2015 Season Korea Regional Finals but they lost 3–2 to the Jin Air Green Wings. Kim did not play in playoffs or the regionals. Kim left the team in November.

In late December, Kim moved to Europe to and joined G2 Esports of the EU LCS, as their new starting jungler, G2 also signed Emperor and YoungBuck as coach. The team quickly rose to prominence and recognition in the LCS, consistently tied for first place after each week, sometimes with H2k and sometimes also with Team Vitality, until the end of the split when they held first place with sole possession. With a quarterfinal bye, the playoffs also saw them strong, as they defeated both Fnatic and Origen 3–1 to win the season and secure an invitation to the 2016 Mid-Season Invitational.

Going into MSI, G2 Esports were seen as a favorite not to win, but to come in second place to the Korean representatives SK Telecom T1. However, the team lost their first four games of the round robin and ultimately finished in fifth place, ahead of only SuperMassive eSports, and out of playoff contention - importantly, this placement meant that Europe would forfeit their Pool 1 seed at Worlds. In a statement published partway through the second day of play, G2 stated that their players had taken vacation time after a "rigorous Spring Split." AD carry Emperor later stated that there had been an internal conflict within the team one day prior to the start of the event. In November 2017, Kim left G2 to join Korean team bbq Olivers. Kim returned to Europe in April 2019, signing with FC Schalke 04 Esports. After competing with SK Gaming in 2020, Kim retired from competitive play.

== Tournament results ==
=== G2 Esports ===
- 1st — 2016 Spring EU LCS regular season
- 1st — 2016 Spring EU LCS playoffs
- 5th–6th — 2016 Mid-Season Invitational
- 1st — 2016 Spring EU LCS
- 1st — 2016 Summer EU LCS regular season
- 1st — 2016 Summer EU LCS playoffs
