= Mithy =

Spanish professional League of Legends player and coach

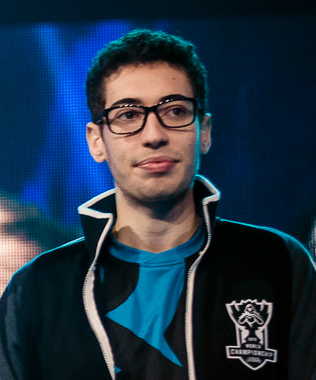
- Mithy at the 2015 League of Legends World Championship quarter-finals

Personal information
- Name: Alfonso Aguirre Rodríguez
- Born: 1993 or 1994 (age 31–32)
- Nationality: Spanish

Current team
- Team: Team Heretics
- Role: Assistant Coach
- Game: League of Legends
- League: LEC

Career information
- Playing career: 2012–2019
- Role: Support
- Coaching career: 2020–present

Team history

As player:
- 2012: GIANTS! Gaming
- 2013: Wizards e-Sports Club
- 2013: Heimerdinger's Colossi
- 2013: against All authority
- 2013: Lemondogs
- 2014: Ninjas in Pyjamas
- 2015–2016: Origen
- 2016–2017: G2 Esports
- 2018: Team SoloMid
- 2019: Origen

As coach:
- 2020: Fnatic
- 2021: Cloud9
- 2022: 100 Thieves (assistant)
- 2022–2024: Cloud9
- 2024–2025: FlyQuest (assistant)
- 2026–present: Team Heretics (assistant)

Career highlights and awards
- Rift Rivals champion (2019); 3× LEC champion; 2× LEC 1st All-Pro Team

Alfonso Aguirre Rodríguez, better known as Mithy, is a Spanish former professional League of Legends player, and current assistant coach for FlyQuest. He joined Ninjas in Pyjamas in October 2013. He joined G2 on May 19, 2016, ahead of the 2016 Summer EU LCS split. He then joined Team SoloMid in 2018. In 2019 he played his final year in Origen before retiring to be a coach.

== Seasons overview ==
Year	Team	Domestic			Regional	International	
Year	Team	League	Split		Rift Rivals	Mid-Season Invitational	World Championship
Year	Team	League	Spring	Summer	Rift Rivals	Mid-Season Invitational	World Championship
2013	Lemondogs	EU LCS	—	2nd	—N/a	—N/a	9th–10th
2014	Ninjas in Pyjamas	EU CS	2nd	—	—N/a	—N/a	—
2015	Origen	EU CS	1st	—	—N/a	—	—
2015	Origen	EU LCS	—	2nd	—N/a	—	3rd–4th
2016	Origen	EU LCS	2nd	—	—N/a	Did not qualify	—
2016	G2 Esports	EU LCS	—	1st	—N/a	—	13th–16th
2017	G2 Esports	EU LCS	1st	1st	2nd	2nd	9th–11th
2018	Team SoloMid	NA LCS	5th	3rd	Did not qualify		
2019	Origen	LEC	2nd	8th	1st	Did not qualify	

== Awards and honors ==
International

- One-time Rift Rivals champion – 2019

LEC

- Three-time LEC champion – Summer 2016, Spring 2017, Summer 2017
- Two-time LEC 1st All-Pro Team – Summer 2016, Summer 2017
- One-time LEC 2nd All-Pro Team – Spring 2017
- One-time LEC 3rd All-Pro Team – Spring 2019

EU CS

- One-time EU CS champion – Spring 2015
