= Zven =

Danish League of Legends player

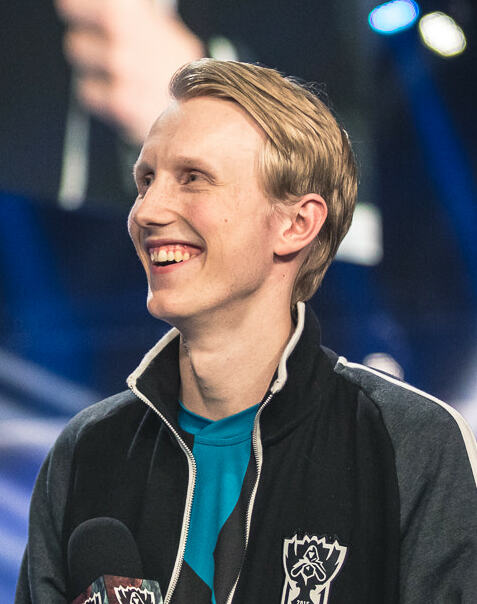
- Zven at the 2015 League of Legends World Championship

Personal information
- Name: Jesper Svenningsen
- Born: 24 June 1997 (age 29)
- Nationality: Danish

Current team
- Team: Cloud9
- Role: BOT / Support
- Game: League of Legends
- League: LTA (North Conference)

Career information
- Playing career: 2014–present

Team history
- 2014: SK Gaming Prime
- 2014–2016: Origen
- 2016–2017: G2 Esports
- 2018–2019: Team SoloMid
- 2020–2023: Cloud9
- 2024: Dignitas
- 2025–present: Cloud9

Career highlights and awards
- 3× LEC champion; 4× LCS champion; IEM champion (2015)

Jesper Svenningsen (born 24 June 1997), better known as Zven (formerly Niels), is a Danish professional League of Legends player who plays AD Carry for Cloud9 in the League of Legends Championship of The Americas (LTA) North Conference. He previously played for Team SoloMid, G2 Esports, Origen, SK Gaming Prime and Dignitas.

He had played for Origen and finished at 2015 Worlds semifinals. Then he joined G2 in May 2016 along with Mithy, ahead of the 2016 EU LCS Summer split. Zven joined Cloud9 for the 2020 LCS season wherein they won the Spring Split; Zven and Cloud9 won the 2021 Spring Split of the LCS as well. Zven was sent to the Cloud9 Academy team for the 2021 Summer Split. In 2022, he returned to the main roster, roleswapping to support after having played the role of AD Carry for his entire career. After the 2023 World Championship, he left Cloud9, citing a desire to return to the ADC role. He then joined Dignitas as their AD Carry for the 2024 LCS season Summer Split.

== Tournament results ==
Origen

- 3–4th — 2015 League of Legends World Championship
- 2nd — 2016 EU LCS Spring

G2 Esports

- 1st — 2016 Summer EU LCS regular season
- 1st — 2016 Summer EU LCS playoffs
- 1st — 2017 Spring EU LCS playoffs
- 1st — 2017 Spring EU LCS playoffs
- 13–16th — 2016 League of Legends World Championship

Cloud9

- 1st – 2020 Spring Split
- 1st – 2021 Spring Split
- 1st – 2022 Summer Split
- 1st – 2023 Spring Split
