= Expect (gamer) =

South Korean gamer

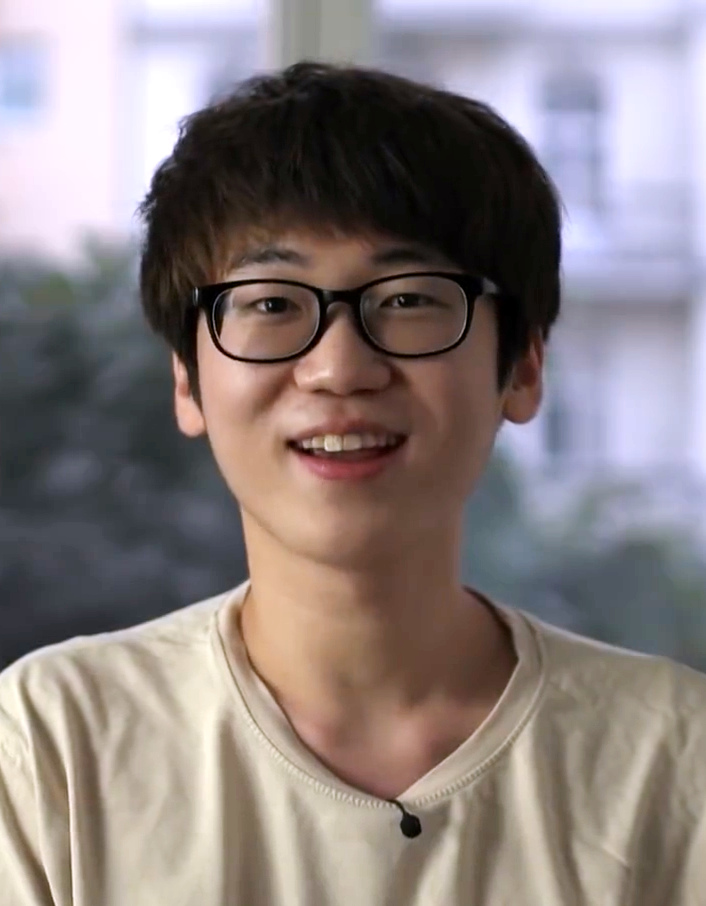
- Ki in 2016

Personal information
- Name: 기대한 (Ki Dae-han)
- Nationality: South Korean

Career information
- Playing career: 2014–present
- Role: Top Laner

Team history
- 2014: Midas FIO
- 2014: Xenics Storm
- 2015–2016: 2144 Gaming
- 2016–2017: G2 Esports
- 2018: Origen
- 2018: Fnatic (sub.)
- 2018–2020: Excel Esports

Career highlights and awards
- EU LCS champion (2016 Summer)

Ki Dae-han (Korean: 기대한), better known as Expect, is a former South Korean professional League of Legends player.

== Career ==
Ki "Expect" Dae-han joined Midas FIO as a top laner in early 2014. Midas FIO qualified for HOT6iX Champions Spring 2014 but they couldn't win a single game and missed playoffs. Ki joined Xenics Storm after the season was over alongside his teammates Nexus and SSuN. The team couldn't qualify for OGN before disbanding.

Ki's name temporarily became "Han" in early 2015 before he changed it back to Ki. Ki joined 2144 Gaming in May 2015. 2144 Gaming played in the 2015 Demacia Cup Summer Season where they lost 3–1 in the first round to Unlimited Potential. The team only placed third in their group in the 2015 LSPL Summer Season and were forced to play in the 2016 LSPL Spring Relegation Tournament. They requalified for the LSPL with 2-1 victories over Energy Pacemaker.Carries and Kx.Happy.

Ki joined G2 Esports just ahead of the start of the 2016 Summer EU LCS split, alongside Mateusz "Kikis" Szkudlarek on the roster as a top laner. However, Kikis unexpectedly left the team on June 12, 2016, leaving Ki the sole top laner on the team. In April 2020, Excel Esports parted ways with Ki.

== Tournament results ==
=== G2 Esports ===
- 1st — 2016 EU LCS Summer regular season
- 1st — 2016 EU LCS Summer playoffs
