= Soaz (gamer) =

French esports coach

sOAZ
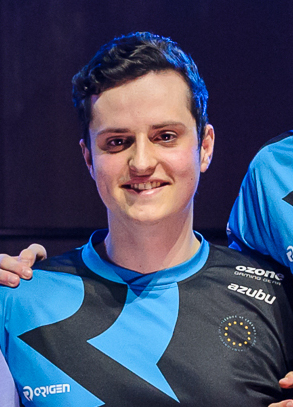
- sOAZ at IEM San Jose 2015

Personal information
- Name: Paul Boyer
- Born: 1993 or 1994 (age 31–32)
- Nationality: French

Current team
- Team: LDLC OL
- Role: Coach
- Game: League of Legends
- League: La Ligue Française

Career information
- Playing career: 2010–2020
- Role: Top laner
- Coaching career: 2021–present

Team history

As player:
- 2010–2011: against All authority
- 2011: Millenium
- 2011: Absolute Legends
- 2011–2012: against All authority
- 2012–2014: Fnatic
- 2015–2016: Origen
- 2017–2018: Fnatic
- 2019: Misfits Gaming
- 2020: Immortals
- 2021-2022: WAVE Esports

As coach:
- 2021: LDLC OL
- 2022: Mirage Elyandra
- 2022-2023: CLG
- 2023-: NRG

Career highlights and awards
- 5× LEC champion; Rift Rivals champion (2018)

Paul Boyer, better known as sOAZ (/ˈsoʊæz/), is a French League of Legends coach for LDLC OL. Formerly a professional League of Legends player, he has played for against All authority (aAa), Fnatic, Origen, and Misfits Gaming of the LEC and Immortals of the LCS. While on aAa, sOAZ was a runner-up in the Season 1 World Championship. sOAZ is one of the most decorated players to play in the EU LCS, having won five split titles (2013 Spring EU LCS, 2013 Summer EU LCS, 2014 Spring EU LCS, 2018 Spring EU LCS, 2018 Summer EU LCS) and six World Championship appearances.

== Career ==
sOAZ first joined Fnatic in 2012 and enjoyed over two years of success with an iconic roster which included xPeke, Cyanide and Yellowstar. On 23 December 2014 sOAZ left Fnatic and soon after joined former teammate xPeke, who founded Origen. sOAZ is one of only 4 players who have qualified for six World Championships, along with Sneaky, Doublelift and Clearlove. He later rejoined Fnatic, and was part of the 2018 team that reached the Worlds 2018 final, albeit sharing time with fellow top laner Bwipo.

For the 2019 season, sOAZ joined Misfits Gaming, along with mid laner Febiven. He left the team partway through the 2019 Summer Split along with support Gorilla as part of a rebuild of Misfits during their disappointing 2019 season. On 12 December 2019, sOAZ announced that he would be transferring to North America and joining LCS team Immortals as their top laner for the 2020 Spring Split.

In December 2020, it was announced that Boyer would be a coach for LDLC OL for the 2021 La Ligue Française season.

== Tournament results ==
=== against All authority ===
- 2nd — Season 1 World Championship

=== Fnatic ===
- 1st — DreamHack Winter 2012
- 1st — 2013 Spring EU LCS
- 1st — 2013 Summer EU LCS
- 1st — 2014 Spring EU LCS
- 3rd — 2017 Spring EU LCS
- 3rd — 2017 Summer EU LCS
- 5th–8th — 2017 League of Legends World Championship
- 1st — 2018 Spring EU LCS
- 3rd–4th — 2018 Mid-Season Invitational
- 1st — 2018 Summer EU LCS
- 2nd — 2018 League of Legends World Championship

=== Origen ===
- 1st — 2015 Spring EU CS
- 2nd — 2015 Summer EU LCS
- 3rd–4th — 2015 League of Legends World Championship
- 1st — IEM X San Jose
- 2nd — 2016 Spring EU LCS
- 9th — 2016 Summer EU LCS
