= Kobbé =

Kobbé is a surname. Notable people with the surname include:

- Gustav Kobbé (1857–1918), American music critic and author
- William August Kobbé (1840–1931), American major-general
  - Fort Kobbe
- Ole Mikal Kobbe (1881–1955), Norwegian military officer and politician
