= Djoko =

Djoko may refer to:

- An alternative spelling of Joko or Jaka, a Javanese male name
- An alternative spelling of Đoko (a diminutive of the name Đorđe (Anglicanized as "George")), a Serbian male given name

== See also ==
- Đoković, a Serbian surname derived from the male given name "Đoka" or "Đoko"
