= Splyce =

Former esports organization and media company

- Short name: SPY
- Divisions: Call of Duty; League of Legends; Overwatch; SMITE; Starcraft II
- Based in: Rochester, New York, U.S.
- CEO: Marty Strenczewilk
- General manager: Till Werdermann
- Partners: Foot Locker; Mountain Dew; Corsair; Twitch; SCUF Gaming
- Parent group: OverActive Media
- Website: splyce.gg

Splyce (SPY) was a professional esports organization and media company based in Rochester, New York. Their League of Legends team was a franchise member of the LEC, Europe's top professional league for League of Legends. Splyce announced its rebranding from Follow eSports in November 2015. On November 29, 2019, Splyce's parent company, OverActive Media, announced it had merged Splyce with its other esports subsidiary, MAD Lions, and that all of Splyce's teams would henceforth compete under that name.

== League of Legends ==
Follow eSports acquired the League of Legends team Dignitas EU after they qualified for the EU LCS (now LEC) on October 29, 2015, for nearly £625,000 ($1 million). At the time of the acquisition the team's roster consisted of Martin "Wunderwear" Hansen, Chres "Sencux" Laursen, Kasper "Kobbe" Kobberup, and Nicolai "Nisbeth" Nisbeth with Daniel Vorborg as Team Manager.

=== Tournament results ===
- 7th/10th – 2016 Spring EU LCS
- 2nd – 2016 Summer EU LCS regular season
- Runner-up – 2016 Summer EU LCS playoffs
- 5th/6th – 2017 Spring EU LCS playoffs
- 5th/6th – 2017 Summer EU LCS playoffs

== Call of Duty ==
On January 2, the day that the organization renamed itself, they picked up a Call of Duty roster consisting of JoshuaLee "Joshh" Sheppard, Jordan "Reedy" Reed, James "Dominate" Batz, and Benjamin "Bance" Bance. On May 8, the team finished second at ESWC Zénith 2016. It also participated in the Call of Duty World League.

Over the past years, Splyce has been one of the most competitively successful Call of Duty teams in the world.

In 2016, they finished second in the Call of Duty World League Championship.

In 2017, Splyce won the Call of Duty World League Stage 1 Playoffs, defeating FaZe Clan and Luminosity gaming, among others, on their way to capturing the title and over $200,000 in prize winnings.

In 2018, Splyce were the runners-up in the 2018 CWL Birmingham Open, the fourth Major International offline event for Call of Duty: World War II.

== Counter-Strike ==
On August 19, 2015, Follow eSports announced it had acquired the roster of SapphireKelownaDotCom. Follow eSports dropped SapphireKelownaDotCom and picked up the roster of ex-eLevate on October 25, 2015. Following shortly after the organisation's rebranding from Follow eSports to Splyce, the roster disbanded on December 27, 2015. On December 30, 2015, Splyce picked up four players from the team formerly known as Dogmen and picked up David "DAVEY" Stafford as their fifth player on January 14, 2016. Splyce was invited to the MLG Columbus 2016 qualifiers due to The Mongolz being unable to get visas. They qualified for MLG Columbus 2016 after beating Counter Logic Gaming and Vexed Gaming. Shortly after on June 17, 2016, Abraham "abE" Fazli and Andrew "Professor_Chaos" Heintz departed from the team, though Professor_Chaos was announced as Splyce's new coach on June 21, 2016. Jason "jasonR" Ruchelski additionally departed from the roster on July 7, 2016. On July 12, 2016, Splyce officially announced the signing of Joey "CRUC1AL" Steusel, Asger "AcilioN" Larsen and Enkhtaivan "Machinegun" Lkhagva. In the following 2 years, Splyce made some minor roster adjustments. On April 29, 2018, Splyce announced that they would pull out CS:GO, stating "It is something that is the best for all of us".

=== Tournament results ===
- 13th–16th – MLG Columbus 2016

== Halo ==
On October 11, 2018, Splyce announced that their Halo roster consisting of Renegade, Shotzzy, StelluR and Eco would be competing in the Call of Duty World League as well.

=== Tournament results ===
- 1st – 2018 Halo World Championships
- 4th – 2017 Halo World Championships
- 2nd – HCS London 2018
- 1st – MLG New Orleans 2018
- 1st – Halo World Championship 2018 North America Regional Finals
- 1st – MLG Orlando 2018
- 3rd – HCS Pro League Fall 2017 Finals

== Rocket League ==
On May 10, 2017, Splyce announced that they had signed Jaime "Karma" Bickford, a former Hearthstone turned Rocket League player, to their stream team. Three months later, Chandler "HotWheelsSid" Higdon and Braden "Pluto" Schenetzki were brought into the squad to compete in RLCS Season 4. However, this team failed to qualify through the open qualifiers and eventually disbanded. On March 6, 2018, Splyce announced the new roster which retained Karma and brought in Trevor "DudeWithTheNose" Hannah and Jake "JWismont" Wismont. Jimmy "Jimmer" Jordan was also brought in as a coach for the squad. Season 5 saw Splyce make it through the open qualifiers and into the RLRS, but a disappointing sixth-place finish meant they would not be staying in the Rival Series. The team stuck together for Season 6 and again qualified for the RLRS. A first-place finish in the regular season booked Splyce a trip to the Promotional Tournament, where they defeated both Bread and Rogue to gain promotion into the RLCS for Season 7.

=== Tournament results ===
- 1st – RLCS Season 6 NA Promotion Tournament

== Fighting games ==
On August 24, 2015, Follow eSports started a Super Smash Bros. division first signing two players. They would later expand into the FGC with the signing of Ryan "Filipino Champ" Ramirez.

== Starcraft II ==
On December 1, 2016, Splyce announced the creation of a Starcraft II division first signing Kang "Solar" Min Soo. On December 25, Kim "Stats" Dae Yeob was added to the roster. Jun "TY" Tae Yang, the last player to become part of the team joined on May 11, 2017. Kang "Solar" Min Soo left Splyce on August 1, 2018.

== Overwatch ==
In 2018, it was announced that an ownership including Splyce had purchased the Toronto Overwatch League franchise, later named Toronto Defiant. In addition to its ownership percentage, Splyce also operates the team.

== Investors ==
In 2017, Delaware North, owners of the Boston Bruins, invested in Splyce. Terms of the deal were not disclosed.

In 2018, Splyce raised a $2.6 million funding round from The Ledger Group/OverActive Media, an eSports investment group based in Canada, and First Serve Partners, a venture capital firm made up of business leaders, pop-culture influencers, and current/former professional athletes.
