= Gamsu =

South Korean professional esports player

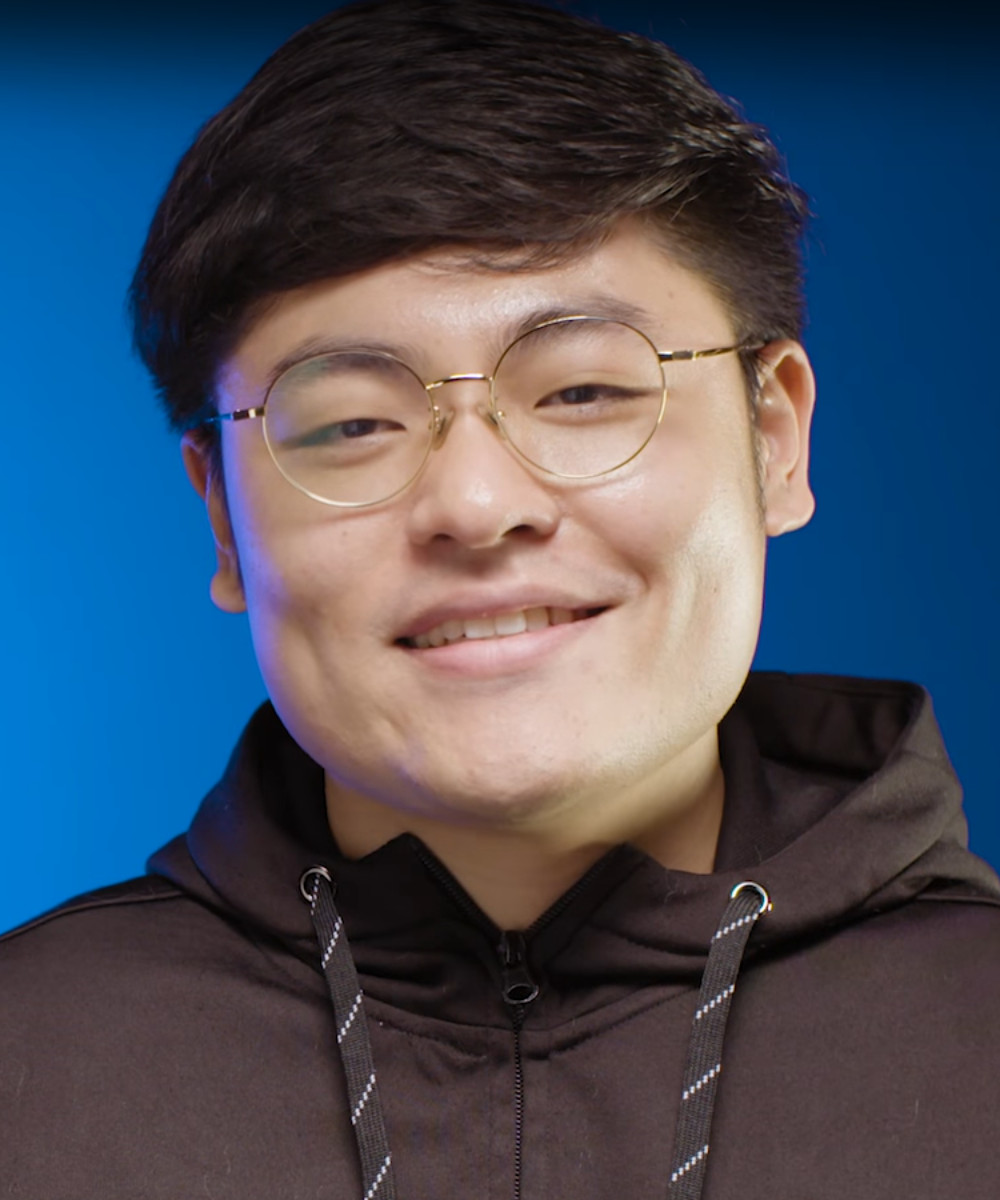
- Noh in 2020

Personal information
- Name: 노영진 (Noh Young-jin)
- Born: 1994 or 1995 (age 31–32)
- Nationality: South Korean

Current team
- Team: Dignitas
- Role: Top
- Game: League of Legends
- League: LCS

Career information
- Games: League of Legends; Overwatch
- Playing career: 2013–present
- Role: Top (League of Legends); Tank (Overwatch)

Team history
- League of Legends
- 2013: Alienware Arena
- 2014: Samsung Galaxy Blue
- 2014–2015: Team Dignitas
- 2015–2016: Fnatic
- Overwatch
- 2016–2017: CONBOX
- 2018: Boston Uprising
- 2019: Shanghai Dragons
- 2020: Dallas Fuel
- League of Legends
- 2021: 100 Thieves Next
- 2021–2022: 100 Thieves Academy
- 2022: Dignitas
- 2022-23: AOE

Career highlights and awards
- OWL Stage champion (2019); OWL All-Star (2018)

Noh Yeong-Jin (Korean: 노영진), better known as Gamsu, is a South Korean professional League of Legends player. He began his professional esports career with League of Legends, playing as a top laner for several teams, such as Fnatic, Team Dignitas, and Samsung Galaxy Blue. Noh transitioned to professional Overwatch in 2016, competing for CONBOX in the OGN APEX Series. With the inception of the Overwatch League in 2017, Noh signed with the Boston Uprising before being traded to the Shanghai Dragons a season later. After one season with the Dragons, Noh signed with the Dallas Fuel. In late 2020, Noh retired from competitive Overwatch to pursue a career in League of Legends again. He played on 100 Thieves' academy teams until he was signed with Dignitas in mid-2022.

== Professional career ==
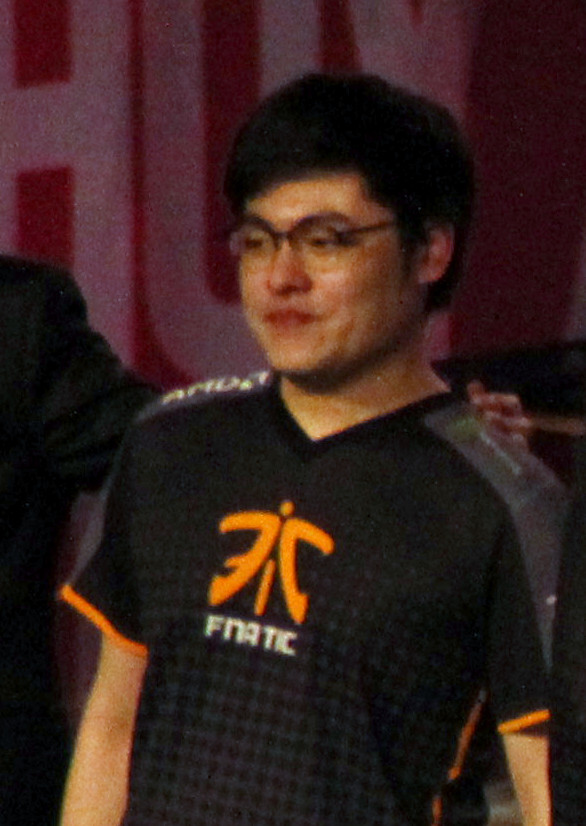
Noh finished his first stint playing League of Legends with Fnatic.

=== League of Legends ===
Gamsu started his esports career with Korean team Alienware Arena. They first competed in the PANDORA.TV Champions Winter 2013–2014, and ended up third place. Thereafter, Gamsu left Alienware Arena to join another Korean team, Samsung Blue.

Gamsu left Samsung Blue and joined Team Dignitas on November 17, 2014. Team Dignitas was then invited to participate in the IEM Season IX - Cologne, and ended up third place after being defeated by Gambit Gaming. During the 2015 NA LCS Spring Season, Team Dignitas fought hard for a spot, however ended up the 9th place, forcing them into the relegation tournament. Dignitas survived though, and re-qualified for the Summer 2015 NA LCS.

On December 17, 2015, Gamsu was announced as the new top laner for Fnatic, and the team was immediately invited to take part in IEM Season X – Cologne. The team had undergone few roster changes, and alongside Gamsu; Spirit and NoXiAK joined Febiven and Rekkles. Fnatic played in the 2016 EU LCS Spring Split and ended up third place.

=== Overwatch ===
Noh's professional Overwatch began in 2016 when he joined CONBOX T6, where they competed in the OGN APEX series. He played for the team through the first three seasons of APEX as the team's main tank and a coach, but after CONBOX was eliminated in Season 3, Noh was released.

On October 26, 2017, Boston Uprising's team president Chris "HuK" Loranger unveiled the team's full roster for the upcoming inaugural season of the Overwatch League, which included Noh as the team's dedicated main tank. Noh found success in their 2018 season; posting winning records in both Stage 1 and 2 and recorded a perfect 10–0 record in Stage 3 – the first team ever to accomplish the feat. While the team failed to claim any stage or season titles, Noh was selected for the 2018 All-Star Game.

On February 12, 2019, just days before the 2019 season, Boston transferred Noh to the Shanghai Dragons. He led the team to their first-ever win, as they took down his former team, Boston, on February 23 and snapped their franchise 42-game losing streak. In the remainder of the season, Noh led the Dragons to two stage playoff runs; while they were defeated by the San Francisco Shock in the Stage 2 quarterfinals, the team defeated the Shock in the Stage 3 finals, which gave Noh his first major tournament championship in his career. Noh parted ways with the Dragons on November 4, 2019.

Hours after the announcement of his departure from the Dragons, Noh signed with the Dallas Fuel. On October 17, 2020, Noh announced his departure from the Dallas Fuel to pursue competitive League of Legends again.

=== Return to League of Legends ===
In May 2021, Noh returned to competitive League of Legends, signing with 100 Thieves Next, the third team of 100 Thieves. Noh was promoted to the 100 Thieves Academy, the second team of 100 Thieves, later that year.

In May 2022, Noh returned to the LCS, signing with Dignitas, a team that he had played for seven years earlier.

== Personal life ==
Noh lived in a rural area growing up. While he played a lot of video games as a child, he enjoyed camping with his family during the summer seasons.
