= Giants Gaming =

ESports organization based in Spain

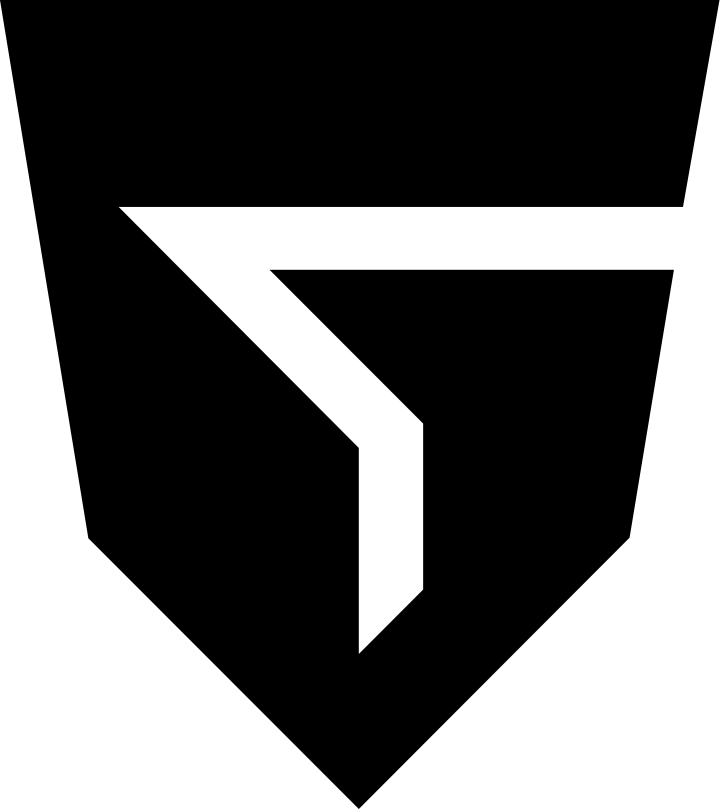
- Short name: GIA
- Divisions: League of Legends, Call of Duty, CS:GO, Rainbow Six Siege and FIFA
- Founded: 2008
- Location: Spain
- Partners: Vodafone; Nike; Chupa Chups; Diesel; Málaga; Prozis; Ozone; Versus Gamers; Nestlé
- Website: giants.pro

Giants Gaming, commonly referred to simply as Giants, was a Spanish professional esports organisation. The League of Legends team competed in the European League of Legends Championship Series. The organisation had two Rainbow Six Siege teams, a Singaporean team competing Southeast Asian Pro League and a Spanish team competing in the Spanish Nationals. Giants Gaming was founded in 2008 in Málaga, Spain. On 14 December 2023, Giants Gaming and Excel Esports announced a merger, forming GIANTX.

== Counter-Strike: Global Offensive ==
=== Tournament results ===
2017

- 13th-16th - CEVO Main Season 12 Europe
- 2nd - ESL Masters Spain Spring 2017 Finals
- 2nd - 4Gamers CS:GO Masters Porto
- 5th-6th - ESL Clash of Nations
- 3rd-4th - ESL Masters Spain Winter 2017 Finals
- 3rd-4th - Superliga Orange Season 13 Finals

2018

- 1st - Master League Portugal
- 3rd-4th - Moche XL eSports CS:GO Cup
- 1st - Superliga Orange Finals 2018
- 3rd-4th - ESL Masters Spain Spring 2018 Finals
- 7th-8th - DreamHack Open Valencia 2018
- 9th-16th - ESEA Advanced Season 28 Europe
- 1st - IeSF EWC Portugal 2018
- 1st - Worten Game Ring Master League Portugal
- 1st - ESL Masters Spain Winter 2018 Finals

2019

- 9th-12th - LOOT.BET HotShot Series Season 1
- 1st - BLAST Pro Series Madrid 2019 Play-in
- 1st - BLAST Pro Series Madrid 2019 Play-in Finals
- 6th - BLAST Pro Series Madrid 2019

== League of Legends ==
=== Tournament results ===
2013

- 7th — 2013 Spring EU LCS

2016

- 3rd — 2016 Summer EU LCS
- 5th/6th — 2016 Summer EU LCS Playoffs

== Tom Clancy's Rainbow Six Siege ==
Giants Gaming first acquired a Rainbow Six Siege team on 8 June 2018. The Spanish team would remain one of the top teams in Spain until it disbanded in October of the following year.

On 8 August 2019, Giants Gaming picked up top European team, Looking For Org shortly before the Six Major Raleigh. The original roster consisted of Maurice "AceeZ" Erkelenz, Léo "Alphama" Robine, Théophile "Hicks" Dupont, Lukas "Korey" Zwingmann, Valentin "Risze" Liradelfo, and Laurent "Crapelle" Patriarche as coach along with Robin "Robz" Planus as the team's manager. Giants placed 5-8th after defeating Evil Geniuses and Ninjas in Pyjamas but falling to ForZe Esports in the quarter-finals. After unsatisfactory results at the Pro League Season 10 Finals, Alphama was kicked and later joined American team, eUnited. The roster, along with the addition of AceeZ and Korey's former teammate, Jan "Ripz" Hucke, was later bought by Rogue, who previously fielded an American team.

On 9 January 2020, Giants Gaming picked up their third team, the Singaporean squad Aerowolf. Before the acquisition, Aerowolf decisively defeated the best teams in Australia and Japan in the Season 10 APAC Finals, Fnatic and Nora-Rengo respectively, before beating the previous Giants roster and challenging eventual runner-ups, American DarkZero Esports, at the Season 10 Finals. At the Six Invitational 2020, Giants lost to MiBR and Team Liquid in the group stage.

== Notable Achievements ==
=== Tom Clancy's Rainbow Six Siege ===
Tournament	End date	Location	Placement	Prize
Singapore Singaporean Roster
Six Invitational 2020	2020-02-16	Montreal, Quebec, Canada	13-16th	$60,000
Pro League Season 11 SEA	2020-03-26	South East Asia	2nd	$10,625
European Union Former European Roster
Six Major Raleigh 2019	2019-08-16	Raleigh, North Carolina, USA	5-8th	$20,000
Pro League Season 10 EU	2019-10-14	Europe	2nd	Finals
6 French League	2019-10-24	France	1st	Finals
6 French League Finals	2019-11-02	Paris, France	1st	$16,789
Pro League Season 10 Finals	2019-11-10	Tokoname, Japan	5-8th	$20,000

==== Spanish Team ====
Tournament	End date	Location	Placement	Prize
Spain Spanish Roster
Spain Nationals Season 2	2020-07-03	Spain	3rd	$900
Spain Former Spanish Roster
ESL Masters España Season 1 Group Stage	2018-10-04	Spain	1st	$1,151
ESL Euro Cup 2018	2018-10-07	Milan, Italy	2nd	$3,457
ESL Masters España Season 1	2018-10-21	Spain	2nd	$4,611
Drone Cup 2018	2019-02-09	Spain	1st	$3,397
Dreamhack Valencia 2019	2019-07-06	Valencia, Spain	13-16th	$0
Spain Nationals Season 1	2019-09-14	Spain	3rd	$886
Spain Nationals Season 1 Finals	2019-10-06	Madrid, Spain	3-4th	$1,372
