= Misfits Gaming =

US-based esports organization

- Short name: Misfits, MSF
- Divisions: League of Legends; Fortnite; Roblox
- Founded: 18 May 2016; 10 years ago
- Location: Florida, United States
- CEO: Ben Spoont
- Affiliations: Florida Mayhem; Miami Heretics; Pixel Playground; TubNet
- Website: misfitsgaming.gg

Misfits Gaming is a professional esports organization based in Boca Raton, Florida, with players competing in League of Legends, Overwatch, Call of Duty, Fortnite, and Roblox. It was founded on 18 May 2016 by Ben Spoont, initially launching as a League of Legends Challenger Series team. It is also partnered by creating a YouTube channel and a Roblox gaming studio called Pixel Playground created by Karl Jacobs and popular Roblox YouTuber KreekCraft on the 24 March 2023.

Misfits Gaming's League of Legends team is based in Berlin, Germany, and competes in the LEC, the highest level of competition in Europe through Riot Games' franchised league. The organization also operates the Florida Heretics of the Call of Duty League in partnership with Team Heretics, and they also formerly operated the Florida Mayhem in the now defunct Overwatch League.

The organization previously had a Counter-Strike: Global Offensive team which dissolved on 14 February 2018.

== Esports ==
=== League of Legends ===
Misfits Gaming League of Legends team was formed on May 18, 2016, to compete in the European Challenger Series Summer Qualifiers after their original parent organisation, Renegades, was given a competitive ruling which banned them from the competitive League of Legends scene. Their inaugural roster consisted of top laner Barney "Alphari" Morris, jungler Kim "Wisdom" Tae-wan, mid laner Marcin "SELFIE" Wolski, AD carry Florent "Yuuki60" Soler and support Han "Dreams" Min-kook.

After defeating EURONICS Gaming 3–1 in the finals, Misfits Gaming qualified for the European Challenger Series. Misfits Gaming finished first in the 2016 EU CS Summer Split and qualified for the 2017 EU LCS Spring promotion tournament, where they defeated FC Schalke 04 3–1 to advance to the EU LCS.

In 2017 the team qualified for that year's World Championship, where they made it to the knockout stage but lost 2–3 to SK Telecom T1 in the quarterfinals. The worlds roster had top laner Barney “Alphari” Morris, jungler Nubar “Maxlore” Sarafian, mid laner Tristan “PowerOfEvil” Schrage, AD carry Steven “Hans Sama” Liv, and support Lee “IgNar” Dong-guen.

During the 2018 Summer Split, the team was successful in making the EU LCS Summer Playoffs as the fifth seed with an 11–7 record. Misfits Gaming came strong into playoffs sweeping G2 Esports 3–0 in the quarterfinals. After losing 1–3 in the semi-finals to 1st place Fnatic, they faced Team Vitality in the third place match and lost 1–3, which put them as the lowest seed for the Regional Finals. They played Splyce in the first round, but lost in a close series 2–3, which stopped Misfits Gaming from going to the 2018 World Championship.

After a rough 2019 season, Misfits Gaming started the 2020 Spring Split strong, but dropped a couple of games in the last half of the season, putting them in 5th place with a 10–8 record. They qualified for the LEC 2020 Spring Playoffs but started in the lower bracket, losing to Rogue 1–3.

==== Academy teams ====
===== Misfits Academy =====
Misfits Gaming's academy team qualified for the 2017 EU LCS Summer Split on 13 April 2017, after defeating Origen 3–0 and Fnatic Academy 3–2. On 19 May 2017, Misfits then sold its academy team's LCS spot to German esports organisation Mysterious Monkeys for around US$400,000. The entire academy roster, excluding their jungler Milo "Pridestalker" Wehnes (who joined Team ROCCAT), was then transferred to Mysterious Monkeys.

===== Misfits Premier =====
Misfits Gaming also has a League of Legends academy team which competes in the LFL, known as Misfits Premier. The team started in 2017 and has been very successful in tournaments and league play. In their first year together they won the EU CS Spring 2017, 3–1 against FC Schalke 04 Esports in the final. In 2018, Misfits Premier struggled at the beginning of their season with EU Masters Spring but ended up winning the ESL UK Premiership Spring 2018, Forge of Champions Summer 2018 Qualifiers, and the Forge of Champions Summer 2018. Their success in 2018 continued into the 2019 season when they placed 2nd in the LFL Spring, and won the EU Masters 3–0 against SK Gaming Prime with top laner Danny “Dan Dan” Le Comte, jungler Patrick “Obsess” Engelmann, mid-laner Adam “Lider” Ilyasov, AD carry Matúš “Neon” Jakubčík and support Aleksi “Hiiva” Kaikkonen. For 2020, Misfits Premier found success in the LFL Championship, coming in as the lower seed and winning first place, sweeping both LDLC OL and GamersOrigin 3–0.

=== Overwatch ===
In late June 2016, Misfits Gaming acquired the roster of Graviton Surge, consisting of Swedish players Nicholas "Skipjack" Rosada, Jonathan "Kryw" Nobre, Andreas "Nevix" Karlsson, Terrence "SoOn" Tarlier, Sebastian "Zebbosai" Olsson and Nikolaj "Zaprey" Ian Moyes. On 12 July 2017, Overwatch developer Activision Blizzard officially announced that Misfits Gaming had acquired an Overwatch League franchise for the Miami–Orlando area. On 2 November, the organization revealed that the franchise would be named the Florida Mayhem and announced the transfer of the existing Misfits Gaming Overwatch roster to the Mayhem.

The 2019 Florida Mayhem season was the second season of the Florida Mayhem's existence in the Overwatch League and the team's second season under head coach Vytis "Mineral" Lasaitis. The Mayhem looked to improve from their 2018 campaign when they only amassed seven wins. After finishing Stage 1 with only one win, the Mayhem announced their intention to implement an all-Korean team and fired two coaches, including head coach Mineral. The team's struggles continued in Stage 2, as they did not win a single match. Prior to Stage 3, the Mayhem's all-Korean overhaul continued, as they made several roster changes. Florida hired Oh "Unread" Nam-hun amidst a one-win Stage 3 as the team's new head coach. The Mayhem found success in Stage 4, when the league implemented a 2-2-2 role lock, as they were able to win four of their final five matches.

In 2020, Florida Mayhem was successful in their OWC East Region Regular Season coming in fourth with a record of 17–7, qualifying for playoffs. They made a competitive run, finally losing to Washington Justice in the lower round 3 of the tournament.

=== Call of Duty ===
On August 20, 2019, Activision Blizzard announced that Misfits Gaming had purchased one of the two new franchise slots for the Call of Duty League. According to ESPN, the publisher was looking to sell slots for approximately US$25 million per team. On October 28, 2019, branding was revealed as the Florida Mutineers. On December 2, 2019, they revealed the five-man starting roster of Prestinni, Frosty, Skyz, Havok, and Maux and coach Atura. After splitting their first two series of the 2020 season at the CDL 2020 Launch Weekend event, the Mutineers outperformed expectations at the Atlanta FaZe Home Series. After losing 3–2 to the London Royal Ravens in their first series, Florida survived elimination matches against Optic Gaming Los Angeles and London, taking these series 3-1 and 3–2, respectively. In the semifinals, Prestinni and the Mutineers ousted twin Arcitys and the Chicago Huntsmen 3–2 to meet the Atlanta FaZe in the finals, where they would lose 3–0. Sometime prior to their next event, CDL Los Angeles, Prestinni made the decision to take some time away from the competitive scene, leading to the team's signing and immediate starting of Maurice "Fero" Henriquez. This would turn out to be a permanent move, however, as Fero would remain in the starting lineup even after Prestinni's return in late March 2020. The new lineup of Fero, Frosty, Skyz, Havok, and Maux would fall short at CDL Los Angeles, going 1–2 in matches with a 3-7 map count. They would bounce back with an event win at CDL Dallas, making a loser's bracket run before dropping the Minnesota ROKKR in the finals for their first win of the 2020 season. An early exit from their own home series, however, would prove to be the catalyst for change. An underperforming Maux was replaced with standout amateur player Joe "Owakening" Conley prior to CDL Minnesota. The new lineup saw unprecedented success across the next two events; Owakening, Fero, Frosty, Havok, and Skyz blitzed through CDL Minnesota and CDL Paris with an 8-0 match record and 24-9 map count.

=== Apex Legends ===
For 2019, Misfits Gaming acquired Matthew “help” Stokes, Cole “Losido” Stewart, and Taylor “moose” Adams for a new Apex Legends team to compete at a professional level. They got 6th place in the EXP Invitational - Apex Legends at X Games Minneapolis, and 20th place in the Apex Legends Preseason Invitational.

=== Counter-Strike: Global Offensive ===
In January 2017, Misfits Gaming acquired the ex-TSM CS:GO roster, composed of Sean "seang@res" Gares, Russel "Twistzz" Van Dulken, Skylar "Relyks" Weaver, Shazeb "ShahZaM" Khan and Hunter "SicK" Mims. As part of their acquisition of the roster, Misfits Gaming gained a spot in the ESL Pro League due to their players having already qualified while representing TSM.

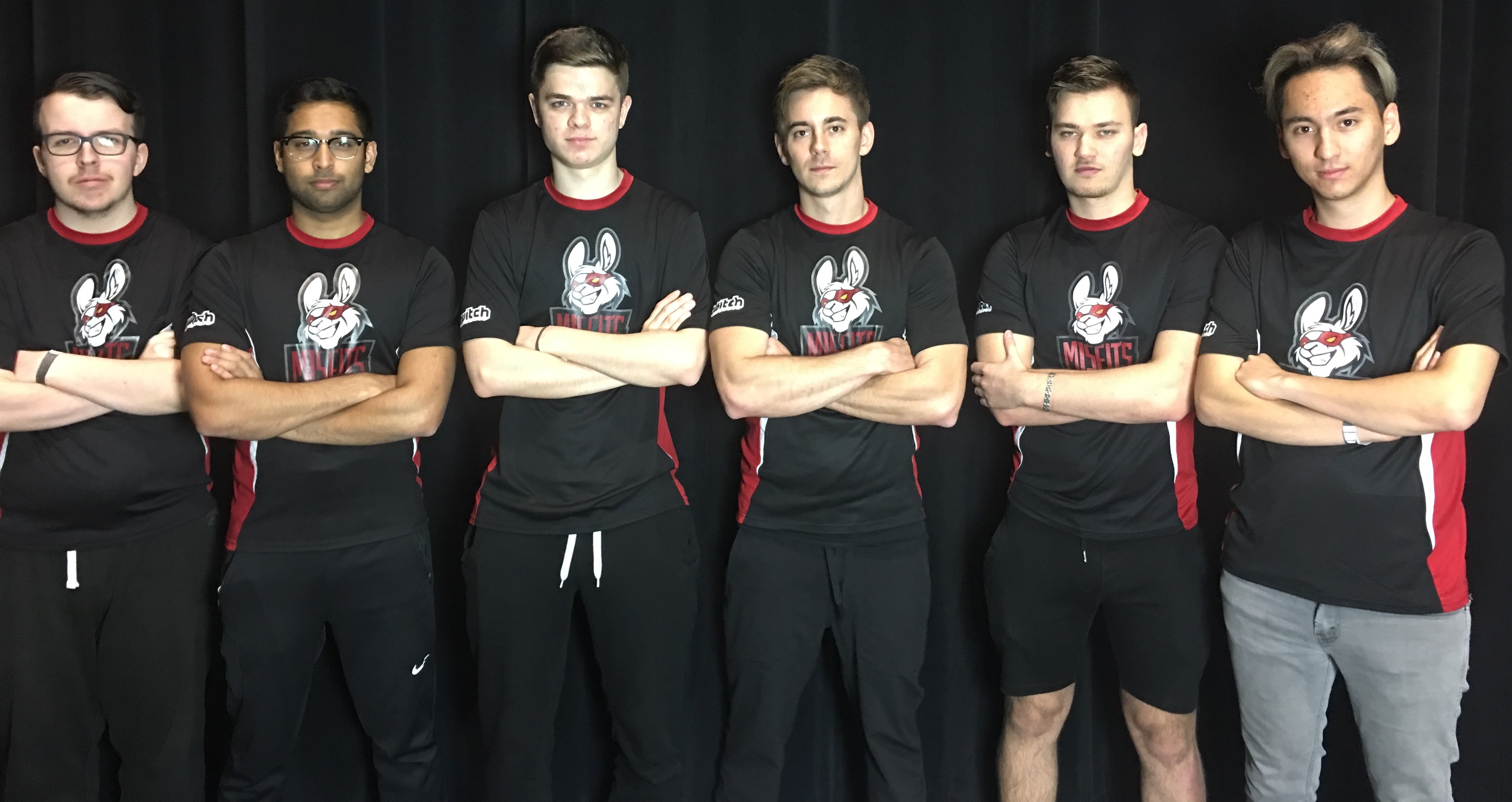
Misfits' CS:GO team at the Americas Minor Championship - Boston 2018 event in Toronto.

Russel "Twistzz" Van Dulken departed from the team on 14 April 2017, and on the same day it was announced that they had signed the French duo of David "devoduvek" Dobrosavljevic and François "AmaNEk" Delaunay. Shortly after joining Misfits Gaming, Skylar "Relyks" Weaver was released from the roster on July 25, 2017. Following the release of Relyks, Twistzz was transferred to Team Liquid after spending time on loan at the team for just under a week.

In the following months, the team was able to qualify for the ELEAGUE Major: Boston 2018, but had a poor showing due to the team's French Canadians being unable to get proper U.S. visas. They were only able to earn a single win and were subsequently eliminated from the tournament with a 1–3 record. Following the tournament, the contracts of seang@res, ShahZaM, and SicK expired, leaving devoduvek and AmaNEk as the only players remaining on the roster. On February 14, 2018, Misfits Gaming announced their departure from the professional CS:GO scene, releasing devoduvek and AmaNEk from their contracts.

=== Tournament results ===
- 3rd–4th — DreamHack Open Tours 2017
- 1st — CyberPowerPC Extreme Gaming Series - Fall 2017
- 3rd–4th — ESL Pro League Season 6
- 19th–21st — ELEAGUE Major: Boston 2018

=== Fighting games ===
Misfits ventured into the professional Super Smash Bros. scene on 29 November 2016, when they signed Ryan "The Moon" Coker-Welch. The organisation later expanded to more traditional fighting games with the signing of Armando "Angelic" Mejia.

== Content creation ==
In Fall 2022, Misfits launched a US$20 million fund for original content creation. One of its first signings after this announcement was streamer QTCinderella, the founder and organizer of The Streamer Awards.

== Gaming academy ==
In September 2020, Misfits announced the launch of their new program Misfits Academy. This started out as a video submission challenge where Fortnite players had to submit their best clips. Holden and Sceptic then reviewed the clips and chose new players to join Misfits’ Fortnite team, and the first winners of Misfits Academy were Eomzo and Yuz.

Academy returned in January 2021, however this time the Fortnite challenge was a tournament, where Misfits teamed up with MonsterDFace's PracticeServer. PracticeServer hosted the games.

Alongside the new Fortnite challenge, Misfits brought in two new challenges giving four more opportunities for people to join Misfits. This was a Content Creator challenge and a Creative challenge. The Content Creator challenge required people to submit a short video on why they think they should win. These videos were then reviewed on Misfits’ Twitch and winners were chosen live. The Creative challenge was for graphic designers, which required them to create a new design for Misfits. Winners were not picked live on stream.

These challenges continued every three months until late 2021.

Some of the winners of these challenges were Kluzzy, Kureo, NathanSmoke, Vertric, Cplitt, Alioof, Kwungle, Sueptime and Xtina.

The Misfits Gaming Academy was managed and run by multiple Misfits staff and affiliates such as MonsterDFace and Charlie.
