= Origen (esports) =

Former professional esports organisation

- Sport: League of Legends
- Founded: 7 December 2014
- Folded: 15 September 2020
- League: LEC
- Based in: Copenhagen, Denmark; Murcia, Spain (until 2018)
- Head coach: André "Guilhoto" Guilhoto
- Manager: Enrique "xPeke" Cedeño Martínez
- Broadcasters: Riot Games, Twitch
- Partners: Ozone Gaming Gear; Trig Esports; Azubu
- Parent group: Astralis Group

Origen was a professional esports organisation based in Europe. Its main League of Legends team participated in the League of Legends European Championship (LEC), the top-level league for the game in Europe. It was founded by Enrique "xPeke" Cedeño Martínez after his departure from Fnatic.

In 2018, Origen was acquired by RFRSH Entertainment, a company that owned Danish CS:GO team Astralis. Astralis and Origen later separated from RFRSH Entertainment in July 2019, and founded the Astralis Group. On 15 September 2020, the Astralis Group announced that all esports teams owned by them, including Origen, would be merged into the Astralis brand.

== History ==
=== 2014 ===
On 7 December, Origen was founded. 17 December, xPeke, Amazing, Zvanillan (Niels) and Mithy were announced as the first four players of the team.

=== 2015 ===
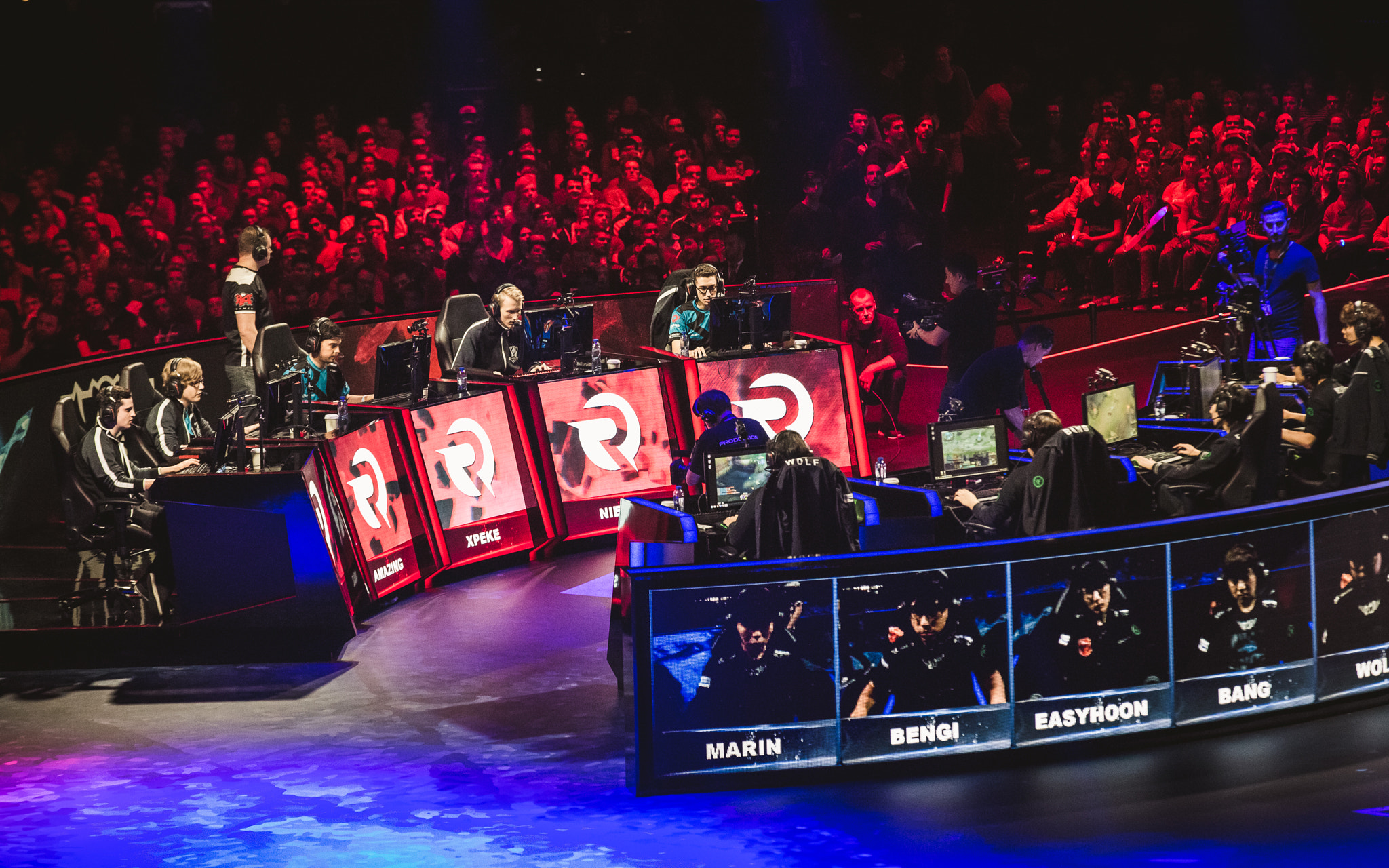
Origen facing SK Telecom T1 in the 2015 Worlds semifinals

January 2015 sOAZ joined. 4 February, Team qualifies for the challenger series. 8 April the team finished first in 2015 EU CS Spring Playoffs and qualified for 2015 EU LCS Summer Split. 30 April, Ducky joined as temporary coach.

On 16 May, Cyanide, Araneae and Casadar joined as substitute players. On 1 September, Ducky stepped down as coach. On 17 September, team analyst Hermit became head coach.

Origen qualified for the 2015 League of Legends World Championship. The team defeated Flash Wolves 3–1 in the first round of bracket. Origen reached the semi-finals of the tournament before losing to SK Telecom T1.

=== 2016 ===
Origen finished the Spring Split 5th, with an 11–7 record. In the playoffs, Origen swept Unicorns of Love and defeated H2k-Gaming, but ultimately lost to G2 Esports in the 2016 Spring EU LCS finals, finishing the split in 2nd place.

Origen surprised many by struggling in the 2016 Summer EU LCS, where they finished 9th, the penultimate place.

=== 2017 ===
In the 2017 Spring Split Promotion Tournament, Origen defeated Misfits 3–2 in order to re-qualify for the 2017 European LCS Spring Split. Origen was then joined by Team ROCCAT and Misfits.

In the 2017 European LCS Spring Split, Origen finished with a 0–13 record, as well as a 2–26 game record, with their only game wins coming against Giants Gaming and Team ROCCAT. Origen finished 5th in group B, and 10th overall in the EULCS, sending them to the 2017 EULCS Summer Promotion Tournament

In the 2017 EULCS Summer Promotion Tournament, Origen lost in the first round to Misfits Academy 3–0, and were soon relegated from the European LCS after losing 3–0 to Giants Gaming.

=== 2018 ===
On 29 March 2018, Origen and Riot Games confirmed that Origen, along with some of the teams from the 2017 Challenger Series, would compete in the new European Masters competition in April 2018. In April 2018, Origen announced that former KT Rolster jungler Choi "inSec" In-Seok, Ki "Expect" Dae-han, formerly of G2 Esports, World Championship semi-finalists Henrik "Froggen" Hansen and Konstantinos "FORG1VEN" Tzortziou as well as Jesse "Jesiz" Le of Fnatic would be their roster for the upcoming tournament. Origen came first place in the European Masters competition, defeating Polish side Illuminar Gaming 3–0 in the final.

On 20 November 2018, RFRSH Entertainment (parent company of Astralis) officially announce participation in the LEC with Origen.

=== 2019 ===
On 1 August 2019, Origen and Astralis are reported to be moving over to Astralis Group, which will split from RFRSH Entertainment. The team owner nikolaj later announces that the transaction will not be complete until August 9.

=== 2020 ===
On 15 September 2020, Origen rebranded as Astralis.
