= Unicorns of Love =

Esports organisation based in Germany

- Short name: UOL
- Divisions: Counter-Strike: Global Offensive; eSailing; League of Legends; League of Legends: Wild Rift; PUBG Mobile; Simracing; Valorant
- Founded: 15 August 2013; 12 years ago
- Based in: Hamburg, Germany
- Colours: Pink and white
- Website: unicornsoflove.com?lang=en

Unicorns of Love (UOL) is a professional esports organisation founded on 15 August 2013 and based in Hamburg, Germany.

Its League of Legends team competes in the League of Legends Continental League (LCL), the Commonwealth of Independent States' top professional league for the game. The organisation previously had a team that competed in the European League of Legends Championship Series (EU LCS).

== Counter-Strike: Global Offensive ==
=== History ===
UOL announced on 17 January 2019 that it had signed an all-German roster for its inaugural CS:GO team. The team consists of Oliver "kzy" Heck, Markus "maRky" Reitenbach, Andre "Kirby" Kempa, Christian "crisby" Schmitt, and Denim "DeniMM" Ameti.

=== Final roster ===
Unicorns of Love CS:GO roster
Players
Coaches

Handle	Name	Nationality
crisby	Schmitt, Christian	Germany
P4TriCK	Zaremba, Patrick Jan	Germany
Anhuin (C)	Paeseler, Markus	Germany
HadeZ	Meier, Lukas	Germany
Python	Munck-Foehrle, Jordan	France

Head coach

Alexander "kakafu" Szymanczyk

Legend:
- (I) Inactive
- (S) Suspended
- (C) Captain
- Substitute
- (injured) Injury / Illness

Latest roster transaction: 11 January 2021.

== League of Legends ==
Unicorns of Love
- Game: League of Legends
- League: LCL (main team); ESL Meisterschaft (academy team); EU LCS (2014–2018)
- Based in: Moscow, Russia (main team); Berlin, Germany (academy team)
- Head coach: Fabian "Sheepy" Mallant
- Manager: Dmitrii "Invi" Protasov
- General manager: Vivien "vivalaia" Mallant

=== History ===
UOL qualified for the 2015 EULCS Spring Split after they defeated Millenium 3-2 in the spring promotion tournament.

UOL then played in the Intel Extreme Masters San Jose tournament. They defeated Lyon Gaming 2-0 in the quarterfinals before upsetting Team SoloMid 2-0 to advance to the finals. There they lost 0-3 to Cloud9, placing second.

Kikis left the team in July 2015. On 13 December 2015 Diamondprox signed with the team. On 27 January 2016, Djoko substituted for Diamondprox for three weeks. On 22 February, Loulex replaced Rudy on the starting roster. On 24 April, Diamondprox left the team.

In early 2019, UOL's application to the rebranded and newly franchised League of Legends European Championship (LEC) was rejected. On 22 May 2019, they acquired the League of Legends Continental League (LCL) spot of Team Just. Their academy team, UOL "Sexy Edition", remained in Germany and played in ESL Meisterschaft.

BOSS, AHaHaCiK, and Nomanz joined from Vega Squadron, which won the 2019 LCL Spring Split, while Innaxe and Edward were acquired from Excel UK and Rogue respectively. UOL finished second in the 2019 LCL Summer regular season, qualifying for playoffs. After defeating Elements Pro Gaming in the semifinals and Vega Squadron in the finals, UOL won their first LCL title and qualified for the 2019 World Championship as the LCL's representative.

UOL has an academy team that competes in the German national league, Prime League 1st Division, called Unicorns Of Love Sexy Edition. Due to the Russian invasion of Ukraine and the LCL's subsequent suspension, Sexy Edition is, in essence, UOL's main team.

=== Current roster ===
Unicorns of Love Sexy Edition League of Legends roster
Players
Coaches

Role	Handle	Name	Nationality
Top	Fornoreason	Schummel, Felix	Germany
Jungle	White	Panglose, Aslan	France
Mid	RoyalKanin	Grönlund, Linus	Sweden
Bot	DenVoksne	Meilby, Nikolaj Asbjorn	Denmark
Support	Twiizt	Garcia Spetsig, Elton Richie	Sweden

Head coach

- Fabian "Sheepy" Mallant

Assistant coach(es)

- Samuel "Sam" Messerer
- Chris "FntasyStar"

Legend:
- (I) Inactive
- (S) Suspended
- Substitute
- (injured) Injury / Illness

Roster updated 5 June 2026.
