= 2015 League of Legends World Championship =

Fifth League of Legends World Championship, held in Europe

League of Legends World Championship
- 2015

Tournament information
- Location: France; England; Belgium; Germany
- Dates: October 1–October 31
- Administrator: Riot Games
- Tournament format(s): 16 team round-robin group stage 8 team single-elimination bracket
- Venues: 4 (in 4 host cities): Le Dock Pullman (Paris, Group stage); Wembley Arena (London, Quarterfinals); Brussels Expo (Brussels, Semifinals); Mercedes-Benz Arena (Berlin, Finals)
- Teams: 16
- Purse: US$2,130,000 (€1,907,194.31)

Final positions
- Champion: SK Telecom T1
- Runner-up: KOO Tigers

Tournament statistics
- Matches played: 73
- MVP: Jang "MaRin" Gyeong-hwan (SK Telecom T1)

The 2015 League of Legends World Championship was an esports tournament for the multiplayer online battle arena video game League of Legends. It was the fifth iteration of the League of Legends World Championship, an annual international tournament organized by the game's developer, Riot Games. It was held from October 1 to 31 in various cities across Europe: the group stages in Le Dock Pullman, in Paris, France; the quarterfinals at the Wembley Arena in London, England, United Kingdom; the semifinals in the Brussels Expo in Brussels, Belgium; and the finals at Mercedes-Benz Arena in Berlin, Germany. The 16 teams qualified by either winning a professional league or a regional qualifying tournament. There was a 16 team round-robin group stage followed by an 8 team single elimination bracket. The games were officially streamed on Twitch, YouTube and Azubu in several languages. The BBC also streamed the tournament online on BBC Three but for British IP addresses only. A peak of around 14 million concurrent viewers watched the finals, according to official sources.

== Teams ==
The following teams qualified to participate in the tournament's group stage:

Region		League		Path	Team	ID	Pool
Europe		EU LCS		Summer Champion	Fnatic	FNC	1
Europe		EU LCS		Most Championship Points	H2k-Gaming	H2K	2
Europe		EU LCS		Regional Finals Winner	Origen	OG	3
China		LPL		Most Championship Points	LGD Gaming	LGD	1
China		LPL		Regional Finals 1st-place	EDward Gaming	EDG	2
China		LPL		Regional Finals 2nd-place	Invictus Gaming	IG	2
North America		NA LCS		Summer Champion	Counter Logic Gaming	CLG	1
North America		NA LCS		Most Championship Points	Team SoloMid	TSM	2
North America		NA LCS		Regional Finals Winner	Cloud9	C9	3
South Korea		LCK		Summer Champion	SK Telecom T1	SKT	1
South Korea		LCK		Most Championship Points	KOO Tigers	KOO	2
South Korea		LCK		Regional Finals Winner	KT Rolster	KT	2
TW/HK/MO		LMS		Summer Champion	ahq e-Sports Club	AHQ	2
TW/HK/MO		LMS		Regional Finals Winner	Flash Wolves	FW	2
Wildcard	Brazil	CBLOL	IWCT	CBLOL Winter Champion ►IWCT Chile Winner	paiN Gaming	PNG	3
Wildcard	Southeast Asia	GPL	IWCT	GPL Regional Finals Winner ►IWCT Turkey Winner	Bangkok Titans	BKT	3

== Venues ==
Paris, London, Brussels, Berlin were the four cities chosen to host the competition.

Paris, France	London, England	Brussels, Belgium	Berlin, Germany
Group Stage	Quarterfinals	Semifinals	Final
Le Dock Pullman	Wembley Arena	Brussels Expo	Mercedes-Benz Arena
Capacity: 3,500	Capacity: 12,500	Capacity: 15,000	Capacity: 17,000
2015 League of Legends World Championship is located in France	2015 League of Legends World Championship is located in England	2015 League of Legends World Championship is located in Belgium	2015 League of Legends World Championship is located in Germany

== Group stage ==
The group stage was played in a best of one double round-robin format, with the top two teams from each of the four groups advancing to the knockout stage, for a total of eight teams. The group stage started on October 1 in Le Dock Pullman, Paris and concluded on October 11. In Group B, ahq e-Sports Club and Cloud9 both ended in a 3–3 tie, resulting in a tiebreaker won by ahq e-Sports Club to win second place in the group.

Group A

Pos	Team	Pld	W	L	PCT	Qualification
1	Flash Wolves	6	4	2	.667	Advance to knockouts
2	KOO Tigers	6	4	2	.667	Advance to knockouts
3	Counter Logic Gaming	6	2	4	.333	
4	paiN Gaming	6	2	4	.333	

Source: LoL Esports (Archived 2018-12-18 at the Wayback Machine)

Group B

Pos	Team	Pld	W	L	PCT	Qualification
1	Fnatic	6	4	2	.667	Advance to knockouts
2	ahq e-Sports Club	7	4	3	.571	Advance to knockouts
3	Cloud9	7	3	4	.429	
4	Invictus Gaming	6	2	4	.333	

Source: LoL Esports (Archived 2018-12-18 at the Wayback Machine)

Group C

Pos	Team	Pld	W	L	PCT	Qualification
1	SK Telecom T1	6	6	0	1.000	Advance to knockouts
2	Edward Gaming	6	4	2	.667	Advance to knockouts
3	H2k-Gaming	6	2	4	.333	
4	Bangkok Titans	6	0	6	.000	

Source: LoL Esports (Archived 2018-12-18 at the Wayback Machine)

Group D

Pos	Team	Pld	W	L	PCT	Qualification
1	KT Rolster	6	5	1	.833	Advance to knockouts
2	Origen	6	4	2	.667	Advance to knockouts
3	LGD Gaming	6	2	4	.333	
4	Team SoloMid	6	1	5	.167	

Source: LoL Esports (Archived 2018-12-18 at the Wayback Machine)

== Knockout stage ==
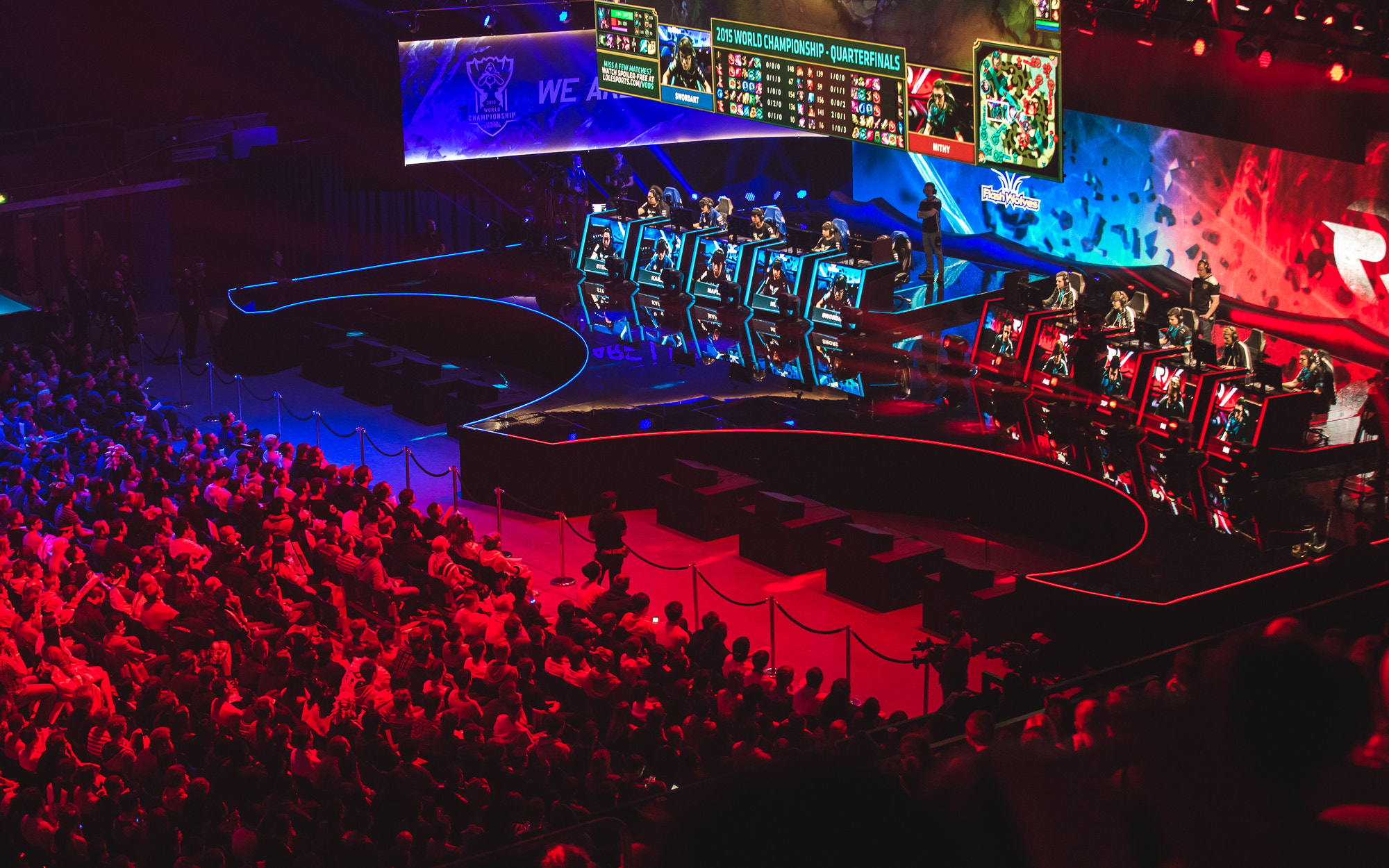
Wembley Arena stage during the Flash Wolves versus Origen game

The bracket stage started on October 15 in Wembley Arena in London, continued to Brussels Expo in Brussels, and concluded on October 31 with the grand finals hosted in Mercedes-Benz Arena in Berlin. The knockout stage has been streamed on BBC Three, while the final will be streamed on ESPN3. The bracket stage is played in a best of 5 format. In the grand final, SK Telecom T1 beat KOO Tigers 3 to 1, dropping their only game of the whole tournament.

Worlds 2015 would mark the last time any team from the Asia-Pacific region would qualify for the knockout stage until CTBC Flying Oyster achieved the feat by qualifying for the knockout stage of the 2025 tournament a decade later, with the Asia-Pacific league now the League of Legends Championship Pacific (LCP).

Quarterfinals
15 October – Wembley Arena
Flash Wolves	1
Origen	3
16 October – Wembley Arena
SK Telecom T1	3
ahq e-Sports Club	0
17 October – Wembley Arena
Fnatic	3
EDward Gaming	0
18 October – Wembley Arena
KT Rolster	1
KOO Tigers	3

Semifinals
24 October – Brussels Expo
Origen	0
SK Telecom T1	3
25 October – Brussels Expo
Fnatic	0
KOO Tigers	3

Final
31 October – Mercedes-Benz Arena
SK Telecom T1	3
KOO Tigers	1

== Final standings ==
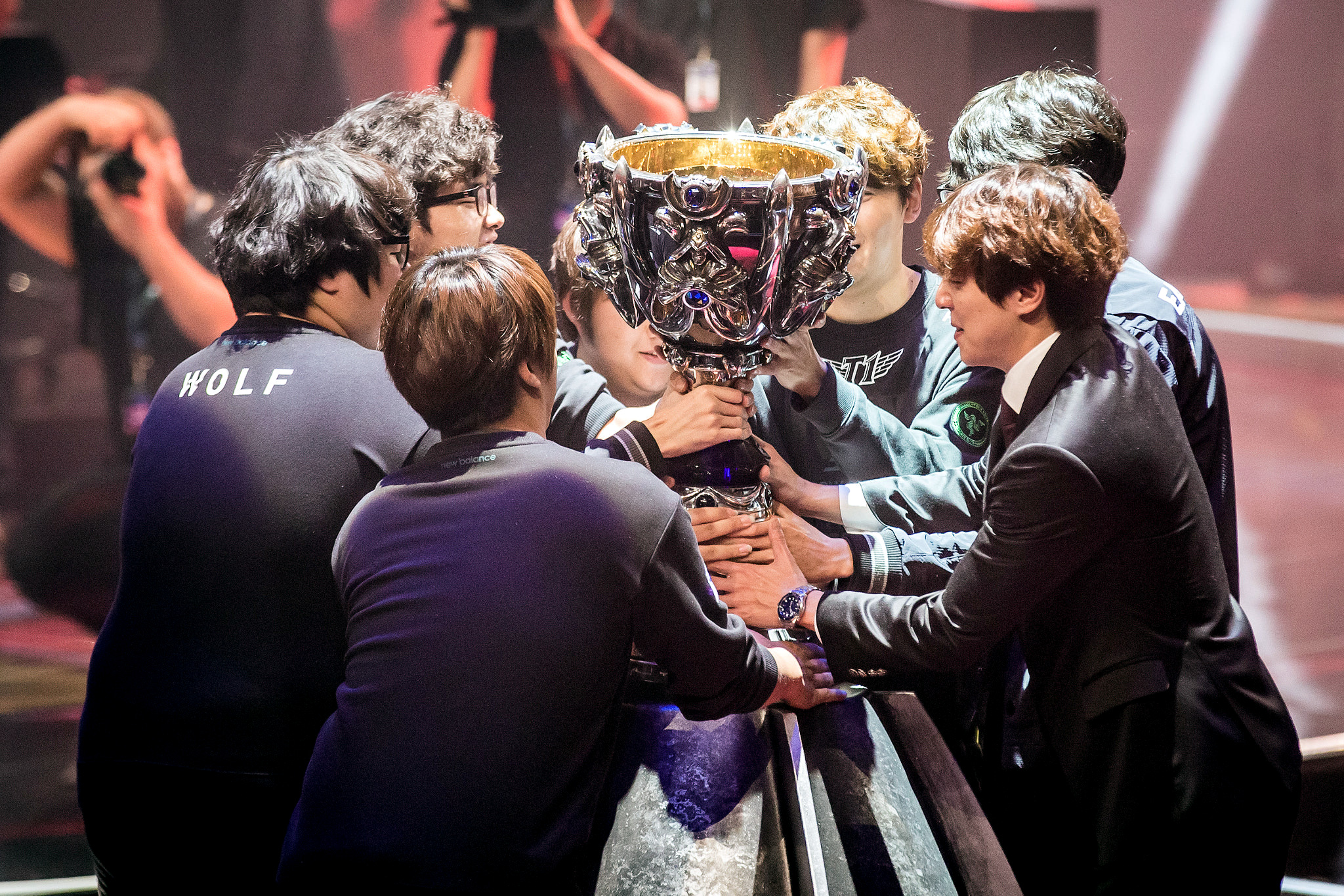
Players for SK Telecom T1 holding the championship trophy

Place	Team	Prize money
1st	SK Telecom T1	$1,000,000
2nd	KOO Tigers	$250,000
3rd–4th	Fnatic	$150,000
3rd–4th	Origen	$150,000
5–8th	ahq e-Sports Club	$75,000
5–8th	EDward Gaming	$75,000
5–8th	Flash Wolves	$75,000
5–8th	KT Rolster	$75,000
9–11th	Cloud9	$45,000
9–11th	H2k-Gaming	$45,000
9–11th	LGD Gaming	$45,000
12–13th	paiN Gaming	$35,000
12–13th	Counter Logic Gaming	$35,000
14–16th	Bangkok Titans	$25,000
14–16th	Invictus Gaming	$25,000
14–16th	Team SoloMid	$25,000

== Viewership numbers ==
The final was expected to have over 30 million people streaming it online. The finals were watched by 36 million people, with a peak concurrent viewership of 14 million viewers.

== Controversies ==
=== Obscenity incident ===
During the final day of the group stage in Paris, Cloud9's Hai "Hai" Lam made an obscene gesture towards an opponent while on stage. Hai was fined €500.

=== Technical issues ===
In game 2 of the quarterfinals between Fnatic and EDward Gaming, an in-game bug occurred to Fnatic's Kim "Reignover" Ui-Jin which prevented the game from continuing, forcing the game to be remade from scratch. EDG lost 0–3 to FNC, but because the remade of game 2, in which FNC had an advantage over EDG, EDG was taunted "lost 0–4 in a BO5" in China. After investigating the issue, Riot Games chose to disable Gragas, the champion Reignover was playing, for the rest of the tournament, along with Lux and Ziggs, champions who were deemed susceptible to the same issue.
