= Hylissang =

Professional League of Legends Player

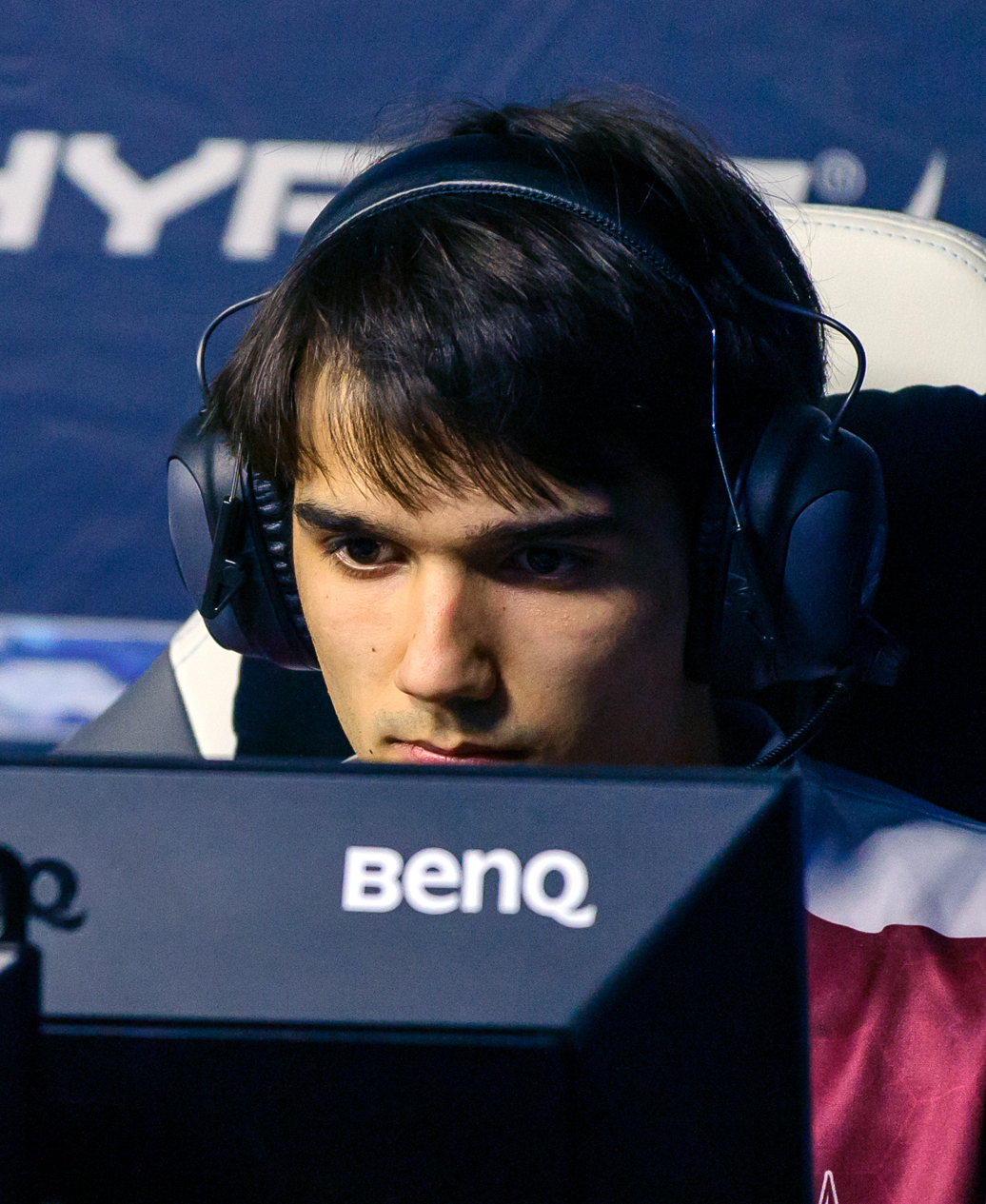
- Hylissang at IEM San Jose 2015

Personal information
- Name: Здравец Илиев Гълъбов (Zdravets Iliev Galabov)
- Nickname: The Professor
- Born: April 30, 1995 (age 31)
- Nationality: Bulgarian

Career information
- Games: League of Legends
- Playing career: 2014–present
- Role: Support

Team history
- 2014–2017: Unicorns of Love
- 2018–2022: Fnatic
- 2023: MAD Lions
- 2024–2025: Team Vitality

Career highlights and awards
- 2x Rift Rivals champion (2018, 2019); 3× LEC champion; 4× LEC 1st All-Pro Team

Zdravets Iliev Galabov, better known as Hylissang, is an inactive Bulgarian professional League of Legends player. Debuting in 2014 for Unicorns of Love, he has played the support role for his entire career. He previously played for Fnatic, MAD Lions, and Team Vitality.

== Career ==
=== Unicorns of Love ===
Hylissang began his professional career in 2014 when he joined Unicorns of Love. The team's promotion to the EU LCS spring split in 2015 led to a fan-voted entry into the Intel Extreme Masters Season IX. The tournament was Hylissang's and his team's first intercontinental experience. In an upset, UOL defeated Lyon Gaming in the quarterfinals and Team SoloMid in the semifinals. They secured second place in the tournament, after losing to Cloud9. Hylissang's and UOL's debut during the EU LCS spring split was also a success, finishing as the runner-up after a 2–3 loss to Fnatic in the finals of the spring playoffs. In the subsequent summer split, the team finished in 4th place. Despite consistent achievements in the regular splits, Hylissang and UOL were unable to qualify for the World Championship in 2015, 2016 and 2017.

=== Fnatic ===
In 2018, Hylissang joined Fnatic in the LEC. Playing as a support to the experienced AD Carry Rekkles, Hylissang contributed to one of Fnatic's most successful years. Fnatic would go on to win the 2018 spring split against G2 and then win the summer split versus Schalke 04.

For Hylissang's first World Championship in his career, Fnatic qualified as the number one European seed for Worlds 2018. Fnatic then progressed as first seed from the group stage with a score of 5–1, losing only to Invictus Gaming. With a win over China's Edward Gaming and a sweep against North America's Cloud9, Hylissang and Fnatic advanced to the Worlds finals. This was the team's second showing in the finals of Worlds since 2011. At the time, Fnatic was the only western team to ever make it to the World Championship finals. In spite of their accomplishments in the tournament thus far, the team was swept 3–0 by China's Invictus Gaming in the grand final.

In 2019, Fnatic placed third during the spring split. In the summer, after a long final series, Fnatic lost 2–3 to their rivals G2. While not the best result for the team, Hylissang was awarded the AMD MVP for his individual performance on Fnatic that year. Going as Europe's second seed in Worlds, Hylissang and his team reached quarterfinals but lost 1–3 to China's FunPlus Phoenix.

In 2020, Fnatic finished second in the spring and summer split, facing defeat to G2 in both finals. Similar to last year, Fnatic qualified as second seed to the World Championship and endured another quarterfinals loss to Top Esports in the World Championship. Afterwards, Rekkles, Hylissang's bot lane partner, departed the team. At the same time, Hylissang's contract with Fnatic was extended for one additional year.

In September 2022, before the start of Worlds, Hylissang and new Fnatic ADC Upset tested positive for COVID-19, causing a delayed start for the two players in the tournament.

After an overall unsuccessful 2021 and 2022 for Fnatic, Hylissang had to leave the team. Following nearly 5 years with Fnatic, Hylissang joined MAD Lions as their new support in November 2022.

== Seasons overview ==
Year	Team	Domestic					Regional	International		
Year	Team	League	Split				Rift Rivals	First Stand	Mid-Season Invitational	World Championship
Year	Team	League	Winter	Spring	Summer	Season Finals	Rift Rivals	First Stand	Mid-Season Invitational	World Championship
2014	Unicorns of Love	EU CS	—N/a	—	3rd	—N/a	—N/a	—N/a	—N/a	—
2015	Unicorns of Love	EU LCS	—N/a	2nd	4th	—N/a	—N/a	—N/a	Did not qualify	
2016	Unicorns of Love	EU LCS	—N/a	6th	4th	—N/a	—N/a	—N/a	Did not qualify	
2017	Unicorns of Love	EU LCS	—N/a	2nd	6th	—N/a	2nd	—N/a	Did not qualify	
2018	Fnatic	EU LCS	—N/a	1st	1st	—N/a	1st	—N/a	3th–4th	2nd
2019	Fnatic	LEC	—N/a	3rd	2nd	—N/a	1st	—N/a	Did not qualify	5th–8th
2020	Fnatic	LEC	—N/a	2nd	2nd	—N/a	—N/a	—N/a	None held (Note: Cancelled due to the COVID-19 pandemic.)	5th–8th
2021	Fnatic	LEC	—N/a	5th	2nd	—N/a	—N/a	—N/a	Did not qualify	14th–16th
2022	Fnatic	LEC	—N/a	3rd	3rd	—N/a	—N/a	—N/a	Did not qualify	9th–10th
2023	MAD Lions	LEC	2nd	1st	7th	3rd	—N/a	—N/a	7th–8th	12th–14th
2024	Team Vitality	LEC	6th	4th	9th	Did not qualify	—N/a	—N/a	Did not qualify	
2025	Team Vitality	LEC	7th	—	—	—N/a	—N/a	Did not qualify	—	

== Awards and honors ==
Regional

- Two-time Rift Rivals champion – 2018, 2019

LEC

- Three-time LEC champion – Spring 2018, Summer 2018, Spring 2023
- Four-time LEC 1st All-Pro Team – Spring 2018, Summer 2018, Spring 2022, Spring 2023
- Six-time LEC 2nd All-Pro Team – Spring 2019, Summer 2019, Spring 2020, Spring 2021, Summer 2021, Winter 2023
- One-time LEC 3rd All-Pro Team – Spring 2017
