= Bwipo =

Belgian-Brazilian League of Legends player (born 1998)

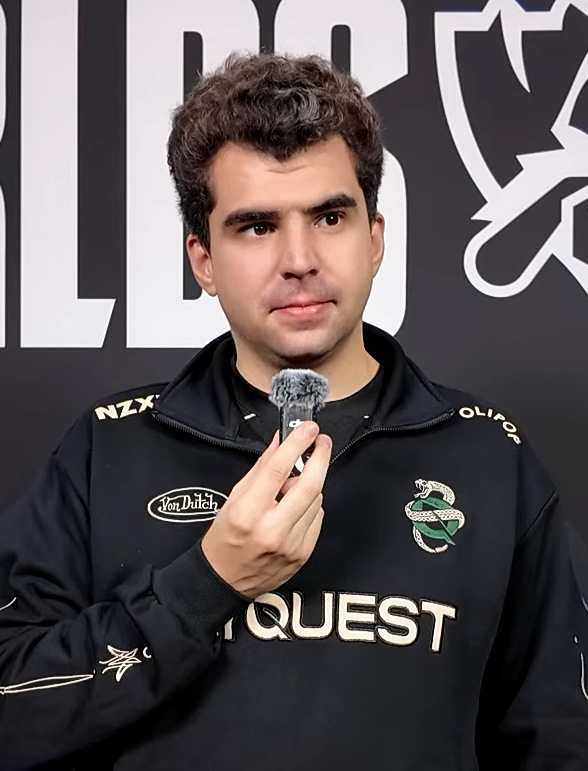
- Bwipo in 2025

Personal information
- Name: Gabriël Rau
- Born: 24 December 1998 (age 27)
- Nationality: Brazilian, Belgian

Current team
- Team: Estral Esports
- Role: Top Laner
- Game: League of Legends
- League: Circuito Desafiante

Team history
- 2018–2021: Fnatic
- 2022: Team Liquid
- 2024–2025: FlyQuest
- 2026: Witchcraft
- 2026: Forsaken (substitute)
- 2026–present: Estral Esports

Career highlights and awards
- 1x LTA champion; 2x LTA North champion; 1x LTA North Finals MVP; 2x LTA North First All-Pro Team; 1x LCS champion; 1x LCS First All-Pro Team; 3x LCS Third All-Pro Team; 2x EU LCS champion; 2x LEC Second All-Pro Team; 3x LEC Third All-Pro Team; Esports Awards PC Rookie Of The Year 2018

Twitch information
- Channel: bwipolol
- Years active: 2018–present
- Genres: Gaming; League of Legends
- Followers: 312,000

YouTube information
- Channel: Bwipo
- Genres: Gaming; League of Legends
- Subscribers: 41,000
- Last updated: 8 August 2025

Gabriël Rau (born 24 December 1998), better known as Bwipo, is a Belgian-Brazilian streamer, content creator and professional League of Legends player for Estral Esports in the Circuito Desafiante. He previously competed in the LEC for Fnatic, where his team was the runner-up of the 2018 League of Legends World Championship, as well as Team Liquid and FlyQuest in the LCS and its one-year successor the LTA North.

He is one of the most accomplished Western toplaners in League of Legends history, with five S-Tier tournament wins and five runner-up finishes.

== Professional career ==
=== Fnatic ===
Bwipo joined Fnatic in January 2018 as a substitute top laner, backing up Paul "sOAZ" Boyer. He did not play in his first split with the team, and Fnatic went on to win the spring split. In summer, after only a week of play, Fnatic substituted out their bot laner and reigning MVP Martin "Rekkles" Larsson in favor of Bwipo, citing it as Rekkles's decision due to changes in the meta. Rekkles returned to his starting role on 9 August, and Bwipo returned to the bench. Fnatic also won the summer split, although Bwipo played in no further games in the EU LCS. Due to their victory, the team qualified for the 2018 World Championship.

In 2019, sOAZ left Fnatic for Misfits Gaming and Bwipo was promoted to full time starting top laner for Fnatic. In the spring season, the team placed third, behind G2 and Origen, and in summer placed second, losing to G2 in the finals. Due to their successful finishes, Fnatic qualified for Worlds 2019, as Europe's second seed. At the World championship, the team went 4–2 in Group C, placing second, and in the quarterfinals, Fnatic fell to the eventual champions FunPlus Phoenix, placing 5th-8th.

For the 2020 season, Bwipo and Fnatic enjoyed another successful regular season, reaching the finals in the playoffs once again before falling to G2 with a score of 3–0. In summer, Fnatic found the same results, and were again swept by G2 in the finals. Due to their consecutive second-place finishes, the team qualified for the 2020 League of Legends World Championship as Europe's second seed. At Worlds 2020, Fnatic placed second in their group, advancing to the knockout stage where they faced Top Esports, and lost in a full 5-game series, eliminating them from the tournament with another 5th-8th finish.

Fnatic struggled in spring of 2021, placing fifth in the regular season at 9–9, and were swept by Schalke 04 in the second round of the playoffs, placing fifth overall. Before the summer split started, Fnatic made major roster changes, releasing Jungler Oskar "Selfmade" Boderek, roleswapping Bwipo to the jungle, and adding a rookie, Adam "Adam" Maanane, in the toplane. In his new role, Bwipo and Fnatic once again finished fifth in the regular season, but this time with an improved 11–7 record, and in playoffs, they won four consecutive games to make the finals once again. However, for the fourth time in five splits, they ended with a loss in the championship game, this time to MAD Lions. Once again, Bwipo went to the World Championship as the second seed for Europe. At the tournament, botlaner Elias "Upset" Lipp was unable to play for personal reasons, and without him the team went 1–5, placing last in their group. For the first time in his career, Bwipo failed to advance to the Knockout Stage.

=== Team Liquid ===
In November, after the conclusion of Worlds 2021, Team Liquid announced that they had acquired Bwipo from Fnatic, ending his four-year tenure with his original team, and moving to North America to play in the LCS. The season started out with the Lock-In tournament, which Team Liquid won. Bwipo and Team Liquid finished the regular season in first place with a 14–4 record. However, they finished 3rd place in the spring playoffs, losing to both 100 Thieves and Evil Geniuses. For the 2023 season, Bwipo was moved off the team's starting roster and continued on Team Liquid as a streamer.

=== FlyQuest ===
After a year away from competitive play, LCS team FlyQuest announced Bwipo as their starting top laner for the 2024 season on November 29, 2023. In Spring, FlyQuest finished the regular season in first place with a 10–4 record. They finished in 2nd place in the spring playoffs, losing 1–3 to Team Liquid. Due to their second-place finish, FlyQuest qualified for the 2024 Mid-Season Invitational, where they suffered an upset to PSG Talon and were eliminated.

In the summer split, the team acquired Mithy as an assistant coach, where they placed third with a 5–2 record. The team dominated playoffs, winning their first-ever LCS title after defeating Team Liquid 3–1. This qualified them for the 2024 World Championship, where they finished 5th-8th after losing a close 2–3 series to Gen.G. This result made them the best Western team of 2024.

For the 2025 Season, Bwipo remained with FlyQuest while the LCS merged with the CBLOL and the LLA to create the League of The Americas (LTA). In Split 1, the team placed 3rd-4th after losing to 100 Thieves.

In Split 2, the team signed İbrahim "Gakgos" Samet Bulut as a rookie substitute toplaner for Bwipo to coach. The team went on to beat Cloud9 3–2 to become LTA North Champions. This result qualified them to the 2025 Mid-Season Invitational, where they placed 5th-6th after being eliminated by Bilibili Gaming 3–2.

In Split 3, FlyQuest went on to finish the Pick and Play phase with a 6–0 game record, where they would quickly advance through playoffs to reach the North Conference Finals, where they would beat 100 Thieves 3–1 to win the LTA North Conference. Bwipo was named the finals MVP, and winning the LTA North qualified FlyQuest to the LTA Regional Championship as the #1 seed, guaranteeing them a spot at the 2025 League of Legends World Championship. Bwipo would be suspended for the first series of the LTA Regional Championship against Vivo Keyd Stars after he made comments on one of his Twitch livestreams regarding women in esports, stating "when a woman is on the wrong part of the month, just, playing competitively, there is a time of the month where you should not be fucking playing competitive games as a woman, in my opinion." These comments would also leave him out of the music video for the World Championship anthem "Sacrifice". FlyQuest would beat Vivo Keyd Stars in the upper bracket final 3-0 with Gakgos filling in and then again the grand final rematch 3-1 at full strength, winning FlyQuest their first (and only) LTA title. Bwipo would be named in the LTA North All-Pro first team for the season.

At the 2025 World Championship, FlyQuest would finish 2-3 in the Swiss stage, losing to G2 in the 2-1 round before being eliminated to CTBC Flying Oyster of the League of Legends Championship Pacific in the 2-2 decider match.

=== 2026 ===
Following his release from FlyQuest, Bwipo would sign with "Witchcraft", a team made up of ex-Los Ratones members including Veljko "Velja" Čamdžić, Tim "Nemesis" Lipovšek, Juš "Crownie" Marušič and Carl Martin Erik "Rekkles" Larsson, for the 2026 EMEA Masters Winter Split. Witchcraft were invited to EMEA Masters as Los Ratones competed in the LEC Versus tournament, but failed to qualify for the playoffs and later disbanded. The team would fail to make it out of the group stage after losing to G2 NORD in their group final. He would join Rift Legends team Forsaken as a substitute jungler for the EMEA Masters Spring Split in cases where Enes "XnS" Hansu could not play; the team finished 3rd in their group and failed to advance to playoffs.

On 9 July 2026, Bwipo would be announced as the new toplaner for Estral Esports heading into the second split of the Circuito Desafiante, the second tier league in Brazil that sits below the Campeonato Brasileiro de League of Legends (CBLOL).

== Content career ==
=== Twitch ===
Bwipo is a part-time live-streamer on Twitch where he plays League of Legends, most frequently solo queue on the North American ladder. In 2024, he had an average per-stream viewership of 3,321 viewers with a peak viewership of 13,995 viewers.

=== YouTube ===
Bwipo has two YouTube channels. His main channel features edited highlights of his solo queue League of Legends Twitch streams, while his VOD channel features full unedited gameplay. As of September 2025, his main channel averages 24,200 views across 124 videos. Bwipo has also been featured heavily on FlyQuest, Team Liquid and Fnatic's YouTube channels.
