= 2019 League of Legends World Championship final =

League of Legends esports series

2019 League of Legends World Championship Final
- The logo used for the 2019 League of Legends World Championship, featuring the Summoner's Cup
G2 Esports	FunPlus Phoenix
0	3
- Date: 10 November 2019
- Venue: AccorHotels Arena, Paris
- MVP: Gao "Tian" Tian-Liang

Live Broadcast
- Announcers: Chris "PapaSmithy" Smith; Trevor "Quickshot" Henry; Sam "Kobe" Hartman-Kenzler
- Viewers: Worldwide; 40 million concurrent peak 100 million estimated total

The 2019 League of Legends World Championship Final was a League of Legends (LoL) esports series between FunPlus Phoenix (FPX) and G2 Esports on 10 November 2019 at AccorHotels Arena in Paris, France. It marked the ninth final of a LoL World Championship and the first time either of the teams had reached the world finals. It was the first time FPX had reached Worlds. FPX were one of three Chinese representatives from the League of Legends Pro League at the 2019 Worlds, the others being Royal Never Give Up and Invictus Gaming, the victors of the previous Worlds. G2 Esports were one of three European representatives from the League of Legends European Championship alongside Fnatic and Splyce.

The series was a best of five and was played in front of over 15,000 spectators, with more than 40 million concurrent live stream viewers and a total of over 100 million total viewers. The series ended 3–0 in favour of FPX after a dominating performance from all their players.

FPX's jungler Gao "Tian" Tian-Liang earned the title of Most Valuable Player. The series marked the first international victory for FPX, though they would go on to fail to qualify for the 2020 World Championship.

== Background ==
A simplified representation of Summoner's Rift. The yellow paths are the "lanes" down which minions march; blue and red dots represent turrets. The fountains are the dark areas within each base, and are beside each Nexus. The dotted black line indicates the river.

League of Legends is a 2009 multiplayer online battle arena (MOBA) video game developed by Riot Games. Each year, Riot hosts a World Championship (Worlds) featuring the most successful teams globally throughout the year-long season. The 2019 Worlds, the ninth edition of the World Championship, as with its predecessors, was played on the map "Summoner's Rift", a play-field featuring three lanes defined by their location—top, middle, and bottom—and two jungle quadrants, mirrored diagonally down a neutral zone known as the river. Summoner's Rift is played by ten players, five per team, through an isometric perspective as players control characters, known as "champions", split between five roles respective on their location on the map: top, jungle, middle, attack damage carry, and support. The latter two are both played in the bottom lane. (Note: The roles in League of Legends are often referred to in the community as "top laner", "jungler", "midlaner", "ADC" (Attack Damage Carry), and "support". The latter two are conjunctively known as "botlaners".) The two teams are referred to as red and blue. The red team spawns in the top right and the blue team spawns in the bottom left.

In professional play, players choose their champions during champion select. This consists of four phases: banning phase and picking phase, both of which occur twice. The blue team starts, banning one champion at their discretion. This is then interchanged between the teams until six total champions have been banned, three per team. Blue side then picks their first champion, followed by red side selecting two champions before blue side completes the first phase of picking and banning by also locking in two champions. The teams then begin the second banning phase, starting with red side. The teams interchange until four additional champions have been banned, for a total of ten. Red side also initiates the second picking phase by selecting one champion. Blue side then responds by picking two champions before red side finalises the process by locking in the final champion.

The ultimate goal of the game is to destroy the enemy team's Nexus. This is accomplished through leveling up and purchasing items with gold, the in-game currency. In the lanes there are turrets and inhibitors, defensive objectives for the opposing team to destroy, as well as a constant stream of minions that can be killed for gold and experience. Similarly, the jungle contains monsters that reward gold and experience upon defeating them. In the river, there are two major neutral objectives. The Rift Herald spawns on the top side of the river and on death, rewards the team with an active item that respawns the Rift Herald, dealing significant damage to the opposing team's defensive structures. At 20 minutes in, the Rift Herald disappears and is replaced by Baron Nashor. Baron Nashor provides the team that kills it with substantial buffs. On the bottom side of the map, dragons spawn. Random elemental dragons that provide small permanent buffs to the acquiring team continue to spawn until 35 minutes in, at which point the Elder Dragon will spawn that upon being slain, provides the team with a powerful temporary buff. Gold and experience points are also obtained through killing these neutral monsters.

== Route to the final ==
=== G2 Esports ===
G2 Esports were dominant throughout the entirety of 2019, both domestically and internationally. In their domestic region, the League of Legends European Championship (LEC), they would triumph over Origen to win the 2019 Spring Split. The match was a five game series and occurred in the Ahoy Arena in Rotterdam, Netherlands on 13 April 2019 with an attending audience of 15,000, along with livestreams hosted through Twitch.tv and YouTube. G2 won the series 3–0 in under 75 minutes of combined game time. This set an LEC record, beating the former fastest five game series by over half an hour. G2 would also win game three, the final game, in a record 18 minutes 31 seconds. They would ultimately finish the Spring Split with a 13–5 record. G2's victory qualified them for the 2019 Mid-Season Invitational (MSI). An international tournament, they would need to compete against teams from other regions. After reaching the semi-finals, G2 beat the League of Legends Champions Korea (LCK) representative SKT T1, a team considered a favourite of the tournament, to reach the finals. The North American League Championship Series representative Team Liquid would be G2's opponent after Team Liquid upset the Chinese League of Legends Pro League (LPL) representative Invictus Gaming to reach the finals. G2 beat Team Liquid 3–0 in a best of five. The series was the quickest international best of five in League of Legends history. This victory marked the first time a European team had won the event.

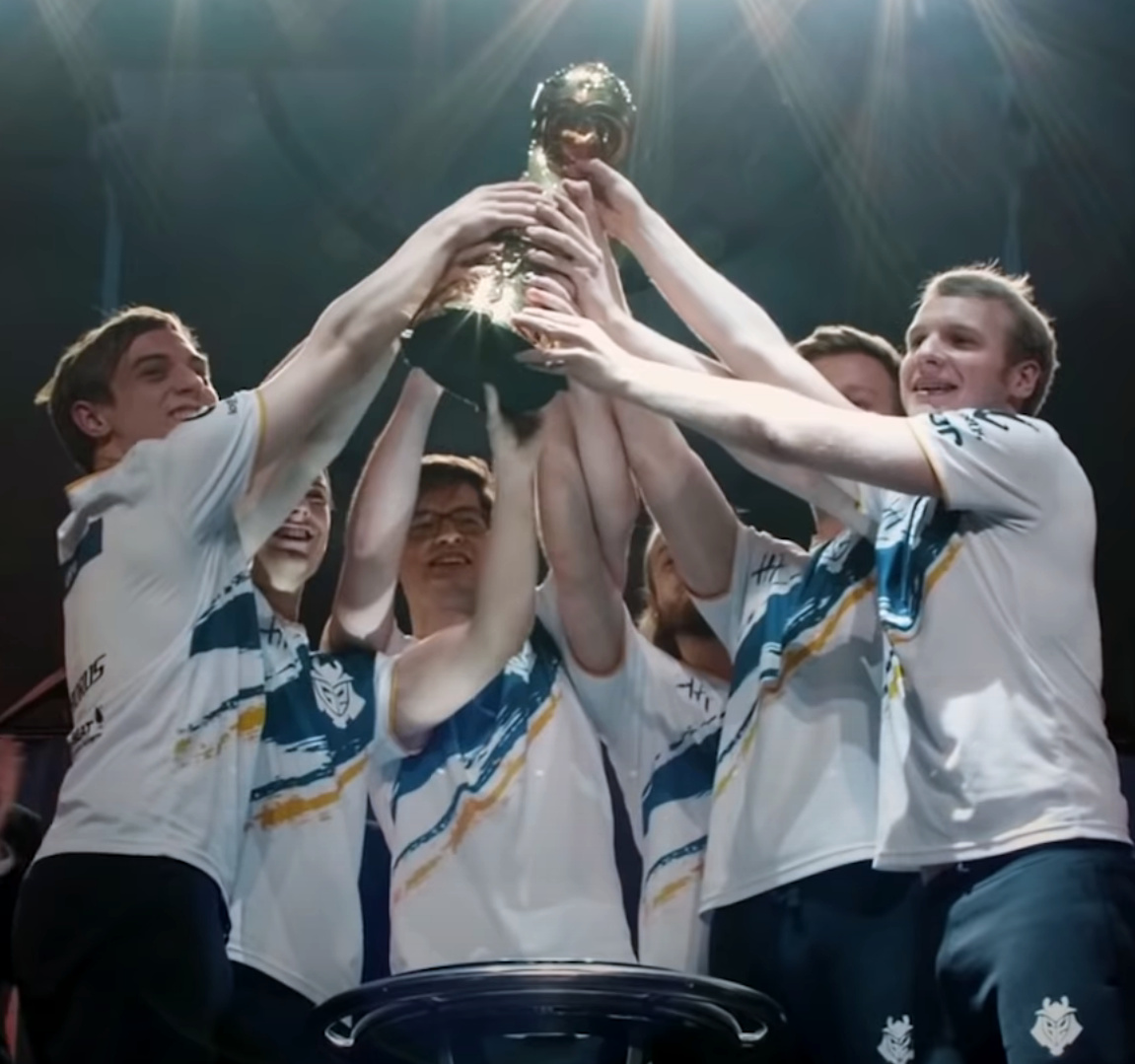
The players of G2 Esports lifting the 2019 Mid-Season Invitational trophy. Pictured left to right: Caps, Perkz, Mikyx, Promisq, Wunder, Jankos

After MSI, the LEC 2019 Summer Split commenced. Here, G2 would perform better than in the previous season, ending with a 15–3 record. The team would once again reach the finals, this time facing Fnatic in the Nikos Galis Olympic Indoor Hall in Athens, Greece on 8 September 2019. The series would become one of the most viewed esports events of all time, peaking at 850,000 livestream viewers. This finals would prove more difficult for G2 than the Spring Split, with the first game going the way of Fnatic. The series would then ping-pong between the two teams until the scoreline was 2–2. In the final game, G2 would draft a team composition that would be strong in the early game, in order to gain a quick lead and snowball into an early victory. This would prove successful, and G2 would win the series win 3–2. This victory cemented G2 as the European first seed for the 2019 League of Legends World Championship and marked their fourth Worlds appearance.

G2 was seeded into Group A for Worlds alongside Griffin, Cloud9, and Hong Kong Attitude. G2 remained undefeated throughout the group stage until their final game where they would lose against Griffin. This resulting in a tied overall record of 5–1 for G2 and Griffin and in determining the winner of the group, G2 lost the tie-breaker, finishing second in the group. Having progressed into the knockout stage, G2 defeated Damwon Gaming, a representative from the LCK, in the quarterfinals and SKT T1 in the semifinals to reach the 2019 League of Legends World Championship Final.

=== FunPlus Phoenix ===
After disappointing performances from FunPlus Phoenix (FPX) in their domestic region, the League of Legends Pro League, in 2018, where they ended with records of 9–10 and 8–11 in the Spring and Summer Splits respectively, the team saw major roster changes, as Kim "Doinb" Tae-sang replaced the midlaner and Gao "Tian" Tian-Liang, previously of Suning, joined as the jungler. These changes would prove successful as they would begin 2019 by achieving a third-place finish in the Spring Split. This split proved useful for building synergies between the team's players. For instance, Doinb developed a playstyle that involved consistently leaving his own lane to roam the map accompanied with Tian and Liu "Crisp" Qing-Song, the support, to gank opposing lanes with a significant numbers advantage.

In the Summer Split, FPX displayed dominance, losing only one series all split to Invictus Gaming, the victors of the 2018 League of Legends World Championship. The team would face off against Bilibili Gaming in the semi-finals, losing the first game but ending the series 3–1. The same would occur in the finals against Royal Never Give Up, which they would similarly win 3–1 to claim the 2019 Summer Split title. This victory made FPX the first seed for China at the World Championships and marked their first appearance at the World Championship.

FPX was seeded into Group B for Worlds, alongside J Team, GAM Esports, and Splyce, the lattermost winning their respective play-ins bracket. FPX began their Worlds stint by losing to J Team on the first day of groups, however they would then win three games in a row before losing to Splyce. After this loss, they would win one more game before competing in a tiebreaker against Splyce as they had both ended groups with a 4–2 record. FPX would win this game, finishing first in the group. Having advanced from groups into the knockout stage, FPX continued to use their signature playstyle and would trump Fnatic in the quarterfinals and Invictus Gaming in the semifinals to reach the finals against G2.

== Background and pre-series ==
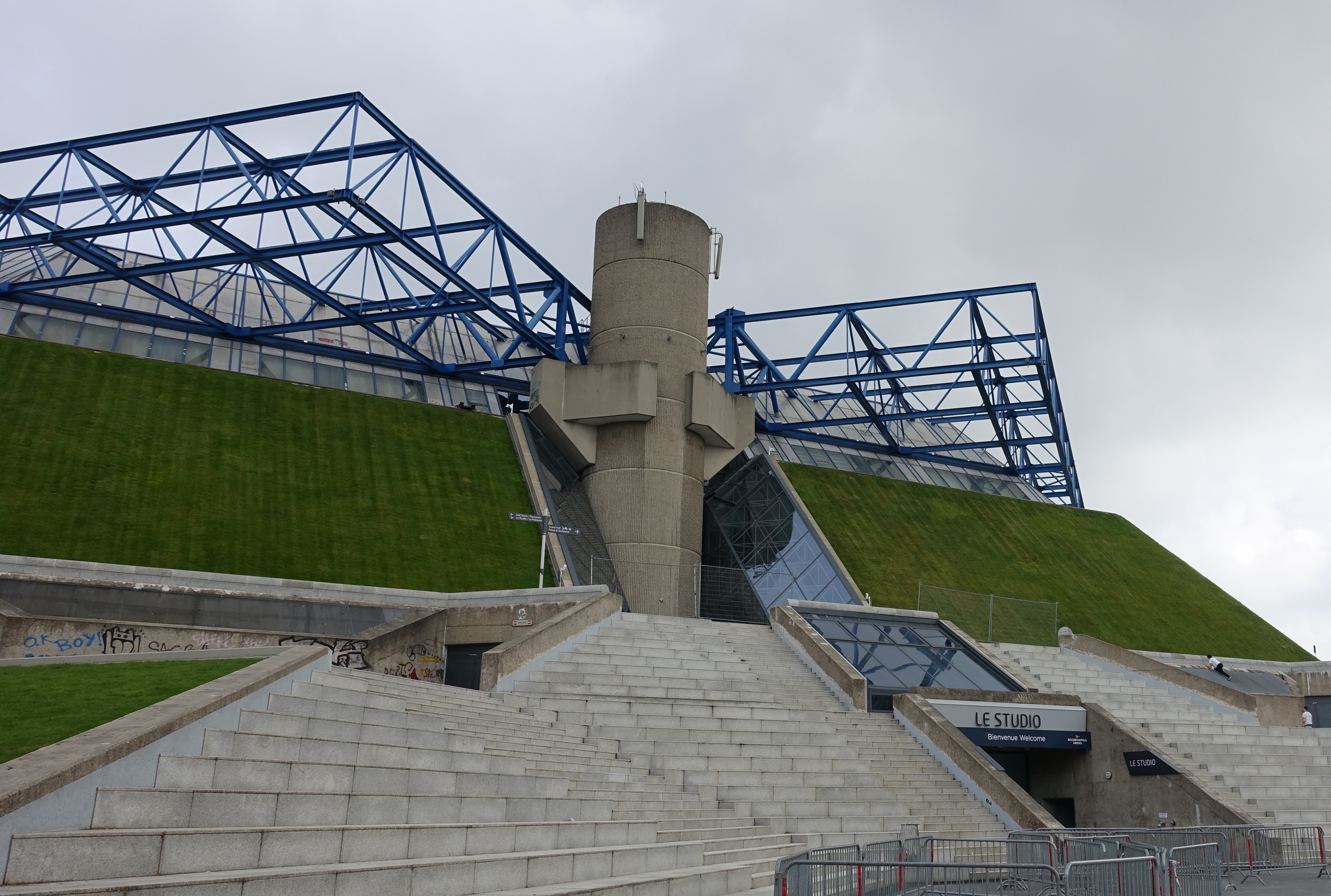
AccorHotels Arena in Paris, which was the venue for the final

G2 Esports were alongside Fnatic in representing the LEC and FPX were alongside Royal Never Give Up and Invictus Gaming, the victors of the previous Worlds, in representing the LPL. This series marked the first time either team had reached the World Finals, despite G2 having made three appearances in past World Championships. The Finals were a best of five series, with the first team to win a total of three games being crowned the champions.

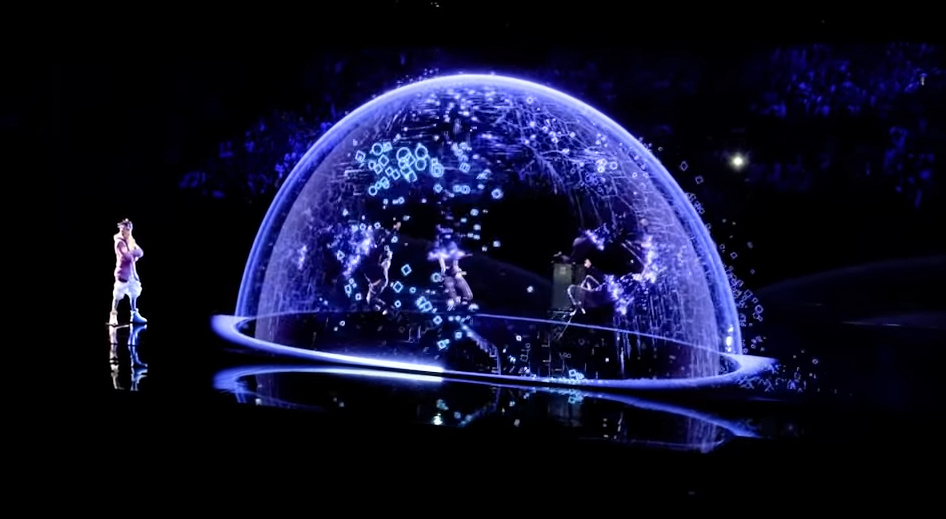
The opening ceremony incorporated holographic projections to support the live musical performances. The League of Legends character Ekko stands on the left hand side.

The series was held on 10 November 2019 at AccorHotels Arena in Paris, France for 15,000 spectators. The event was livestreamed via Twitch.tv and YouTube in multiple languages, as well as through the official LoL Esports website. Globally, Riot reported that the finals alone reached 44 million concurrent online viewers at its peak, with an estimated total of over 100 million total viewers over the course of the series. This equated to an average minute audience of 21.8 million. Prior to the commencement of the games, Riot held an opening ceremony featuring performances from musical artists that had collaborated with League of Legends throughout the year. This began at 13:00 local time (UTC+02:00). The ceremony began with Valerie Broussard performing "Awaken", a song released in conjunction with Riot at the start of 2019 to celebrate the beginning of the game's ninth season. This was immediately followed by True Damage, a fictional hip-hop group akin to that of K/DA, featuring Becky G, Keke Palmer, Jeon So-yeon of the K-pop girl group G-Idle, Duckwrth, and Thutmose, performing "GIANTS". Finally, the 2019 World Championship promotion song "Phoenix" was performed by Cailin Russo and Chrissy Costanza to conclude the opening ceremony. Throughout the ceremony, holographic projections were cast onto the stage to visualise League of Legends characters in the real world.

The English streams were cast by Chris "PapaSmithy" Smith, Trevor "Quickshot" Henry, and Sam "Kobe" Hartman-Kenzler.

=== Team line-ups ===
Neither team made any line-up changes going into the finals. FunPlus Phoenix's head coach was Chen "WarHorse" Ju-Chih and G2 Esports' head coach was Fabian "GrabbZ" Lohmann.

Role	FunPlus Phoenix	G2 Esports
Top	Kim "GimGoon" Han-saem	Martin "Wunder" Hansen
Jungle	Gao "Tian" Tian-Liang	Marcin "Jankos" Jankowski
Middle	Kim "Doinb" Tae-sang	Rasmus "Caps" Winther
ADC	Lin "Lwx" Wei-Xiang	Luka "Perkz" Perkovic
Support	Liu "Crisp" Qing-Song	Mihael "Mikyx" Mehle

== Series ==
=== Game 1 ===
Game 1 Team Compositions
Role	FunPlus Phoenix	G2 Esports
Top	Gangplank	Ryze
Jungle	Lee Sin	Elise
Middle	Nautilus	Pyke
ADC	Sivir	Varus
Support	Thresh	Tahm Kench

The champion selection phase for the first game commenced shortly after the conclusion of the opening ceremony. FPX were on blue side which gave them the opportunity to ban and pick the first champions of the game. In the first banning phase, FPX opted to ban Syndra, Gragas, and Kai'Sa, while G2 Esports banned Pantheon, a champion that had been banned in every previous game throughout the World Championship; Qiyana; and Xayah. Following the first ban phase, FPX first picked Nautilus, a champion the casters described as a "flex pick", or a champion capable of being played in multiple positions. It was ultimately played by Doinb, their midlaner. G2 Esports responded by locking in Varus for Perkz and Ryze for Wunder. For the remaining picks of the first pick phase, FPX chose Lee Sin for Tian and Sivir for LWX, and G2 chose Tahm Kench for Mikyx as their final pick. Before the second pick phase, G2 banned Blitzcrank and Braum and FPX banned and Rek'Sai and Olaf. As G2 were on red side, they got the first pick of the second pick phase, selecting Elise for Jankos. This was followed by Gangplank and Thresh from FPX, for GimGoon and Crisp, respectively, and with G2's last pick, they chose Pyke for Caps.

Upon the players loading into the game, it was paused immediately due to technical problems for several minutes. The teams opted to "split" the map, meaning both junglers began in the opposing team's jungle. After three minutes of play, the first blood of the match went the way of FPX after GimGoon, assisted by Tian and Doinb, successfully executed a tower dive against Wunder. A few minutes later, Tian took the first drake of the game. Eleven minutes in, the fight involving all ten players erupted when Doinb and Jankos met in the top side river. Crisp was brought very low but avoided death by using a stopwatch (a consumable item that temporarily makes the user invulnerable) when Caps used his ultimate ability. Ultimately, no member of either team died. One minute later Perkz was caught out in the top lane and was killed by LWX. Tian furthered his team's lead in the 14th minute by taking the second drake of the game, though G2 Esports traded it for the Rift Herald as compensation, which they then used to destroy the first tower for additional gold.

The game ended in just under 41 minutes.

=== Game 2 ===
Game 2 Team Compositions
Role	G2 Esports	FunPlus Phoenix
Top	Akali	Kled
Jungle	Elise	Lee Sin
Middle	Tristana	Ryze
ADC	Yasuo	Kai'Sa
Support	Gragas	Galio

Game 2 ended in 25:38 minutes, with a final kill scoreline of 20-4, in favour of FPX.

=== Game 3 ===
Game 3 Team Compositions
Role	FunPlus Phoenix	G2 Esports
Top	Gangplank	Ryze
Jungle	Lee Sin	Jarvan IV
Middle	Galio	Veigar
ADC	Xayah	Ezreal
Support	Thresh	Nautilus

G2 took first blood in the third game, but lost in 30:22. FPX would claim the Summoner's Cup in their first World's appearance.

== Post-series ==
The tournament had a base prize pool of US$2.225 million. Of this, the winners, FunPlus Phoenix, received 37.5% ($834,375) of the pool. For coming second, G2 was rewarded 13.5% ($300,375). Alongside this, the prize pool is increased through a percentage of the commissions from the year's promotional "Championship" skin—a form of virtual cosmetic that modifies the look of the player's champion. Championship skins are given to champions that are seen consistently in the professional leagues and tournaments that year. 2019's Championship skin was given to Ryze, who had a 95.2% presence at the 2019 Mid-Season Invitational. As with previous world champions, FPX worked directly with Riot's visual department to release skins for their chosen champions, with one per player. The skins imitate the team's design, hence FPX's skins include "a fiery motif, with bird-like masks". The chosen champions were Gangplank, picked by GimGoon; Lee Sin, picked by Tian; Malphite, picked by Doinb; Vayne, picked by LWX; and Thresh, picked by Crisp. The profits of these skins go in part to the players and their team, as well as to their respective professional league.

In the following season, FPX would fail to qualify for the 2020 League of Legends World Championship after an inconsistent year. Despite accruing 30 championship points in the LPL Spring Split from finishing third, the team was unable to perform in the Summer Split and were knocked out of contention by Invictus Gaming in the loser's bracket qualifier. In their stead, Top Esports, JD Gaming, LGD Gaming, and Suning represented the Chinese region. G2 Esports would qualify and attend the next year's Worlds representing Europe alongside Fnatic, Rogue, and MAD Lions. G2 would ultimately place third, losing to DAMWON Gaming in the semi-finals. DAMWON Gaming would go on to win the tournament.
