= Wunder (gamer) =

Danish professional League of Legends player

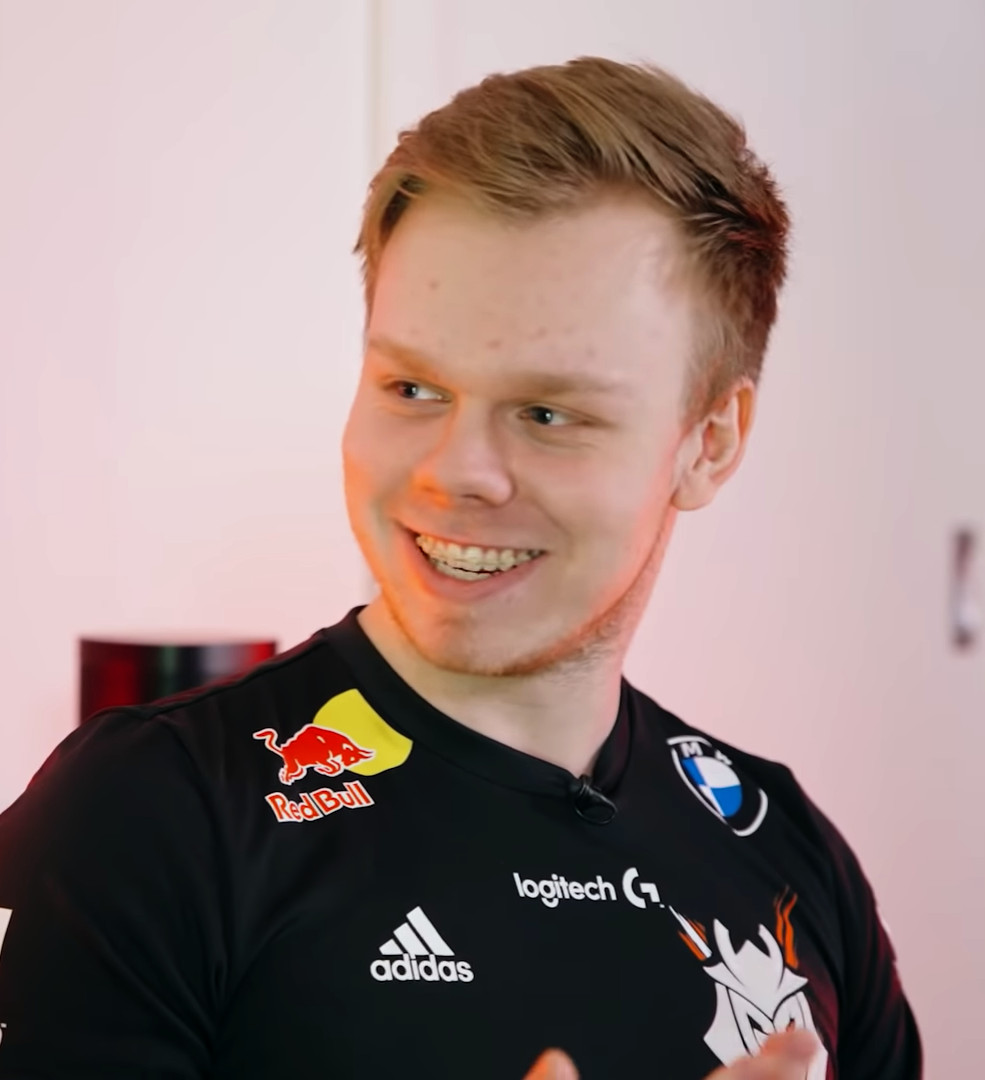
- Hansen in 2021

Personal information
- Name: Martin Nordahl Hansen
- Born: 1997 or 1998 (age 28–29)
- Nationality: Danish

Career information
- Game: League of Legends
- Playing career: 2014–present
- Role: Top laner

Team history
- 2014: 4everzenzyg
- 2015: SK Gaming Prime
- 2015: Team Dignitas EU
- 2016–2017: Splyce
- 2018–2021: G2 Esports
- 2022–2023: Fnatic
- 2024: Team Heretics
- 2025: The Ruddy Sack (Note: Temporary substitute.)
- 2026–present: SK Gaming

Career highlights and awards
- MSI champion (2019); 2× Rift Rivals champion (2018, 2019); 4× LEC champion; 5× LEC 1st All-Pro Team

Martin Nordahl Hansen, better known as Wunder, is a Danish professional League of Legends player for SK Gaming. He began playing in the League of Legends European Championship (LEC) with Splyce in 2016. After two seasons with the team, he signed with G2 Esports. In his four years with the team, he won four consecutive LEC titles, was a five-time LEC All-Pro, won the 2019 Mid-Season Invitational, and was a finalist at the 2019 League of Legends World Championship. He was transferred to Fnatic prior to the start of the 2022 LEC season.

== Professional career ==
=== Early career ===
By July 2014, Hansen was on a team that reached the top eight of the European Challenger Series, and in 2015, he played for Team Dignitas EU in the Challenger Series. However, after a new age restriction was imposed by Riot Games, he was unable to compete with the team in the Challengers Series playoffs.

=== Splyce ===
After an ownership change and rebrand, Hansen competed under the Splyce banner. He competed in the European League of Legends Championship Series (EU LCS) in 2016. His performance in the 2016 Spring Split was underwhelming, having the lowest KDA, a statistic referring to the number of kills and assists a player gets per death, the most deaths, and the least assists among all EU LCS players that played all 18 matches. However, by the end of the regular season, he had the most kills among all players that played his position, known as a "top laner", was named to the LCS All-Pro team, and reached the EU LCS playoff finals. Following an appearance at the 2016 League of Legends World Championship, Hansen re-signed with Splyce. However, he struggled throughout the 2017 EU LCS season and left the team at the end of the season.

=== G2 Esports ===
In December 2017, G2 Esports announced that they had signed Hansen for the upcoming EU LCS season. In 2018, he was named to the EU LCS All-Pro team in both the Spring Split and Summer Split, won the 2018 League of Legends Rift Rivals event, and qualified for the 2018 League of Legends World Championship.

The following year, he won his first League of Legends European Championship (LEC; formerly EU LCS) title, after G2 Esports defeated Origen, 3–0, in the 2019 Spring Split finals; Hansen was voted the most valuable player of the series. Hansen then picked up his first Mid-Season Invitational (MSI) title, after defeating Team Liquid, 3–0, in what was the fastest best-of-five final in League of Legends history, at the 2019 MSI. In the 2019 Summer Split, Hansen was once again named to the EU LCS All-Pro team and won his second consecutive EU LCS title, after defeating Fnatic, 3–2, in the playoff finals. G2 Esports qualified for Worlds 2019, marking Hansen's third straight appearance at the event. Heading into the tournament, ESPN ranked him as the eighth best player in the world and the best Western top laner at the World Championship. G2 Esports advanced to the World Championship finals, where they faced FunPlus Phoenix on 10 November 2019. In the first game of the series, Hansen died a tournament-high seven times, and ultimately, the team lost the series by a score of 0–3.

Hansen continued to consistently perform at a high level throughout the 2020 LEC season. He won two more LEC titles, bringing his total to four consecutive LEC titles, after G2 Esports defeated Fnatic in both the Spring and Summer Split finals. He and the team competed in the 2020 World Championship; Hansen was ranked as one of the five best top laners heading into the World Championship by ESPN and the second best European player overall, behind Rasmus "Caps" Winther.

Hansen was named to the All-Pro team in the 2021 Spring Split, becoming the first top laner in the LEC with at least five All-Pro selections in their career. However, by the end of the 2021 season, it was clear that Hansen's performance had been steadily declining. He ended the season with a 2.6 KDA, compared to his 3.9, 3.4, and 3.0 KDA in 2018, 2019, and 2020, respectively. In October 2021, G2 Esports founder and CEO Carlos "ocelote" Rodríguez Santiago announced that the organization was looking to either bench or trade Hansen prior to the beginning of the 2022 season.

=== Fnatic ===
In November 2021, Fnatic acquired Hansen from G2 Esports, with a reported approximate buyout of €600,000 (US$679,230). Hansen struggled in the 2022 Spring Split, posting the second worst kill-participation percentage among all top laners in the LEC through the regular season. In the playoffs, he played a league-high 32 different champions. After stepping down from LEC competition, Wunder returned to play for Fnatic as a substitute in the LEC Season Finals 2023.

=== Team Heretics ===
In December 2023, Hansen joins Team Heretics after not playing for half of 2023. He joins Heretics with former G2 2018-20 teammates Jankos and Perkz.

== Seasons overview ==
Year	Team	Domestic						Regional	International		
Year	Team	League	Split					Rift Rivals	First Stand	Mid-Season Invitational	World Championship
Year	Team	League	Versus	Winter	Spring	Summer	Season Finals	Rift Rivals	First Stand	Mid-Season Invitational	World Championship
2015	Team Dignitas EU	EU CS	—N/a	—N/a	5th	1st	—N/a	—N/a	—N/a	—	
2016	Splyce	EU LCS	—N/a	—N/a	8th	2nd	—N/a	—N/a	—N/a	Did not qualify	13th–16th
2017	Splyce	EU LCS	—N/a	—N/a	5th	5th	—N/a	Did not qualify	—N/a	Did not qualify	
2018	G2 Esports	EU LCS	—N/a	—N/a	2nd	6th	—N/a	1st	—N/a	Did not qualify	3rd–4th
2019	G2 Esports	LEC	—N/a	—N/a	1st	1st	—N/a	1st	—N/a	1st	2nd
2020	G2 Esports	LEC	—N/a	—N/a	1st	1st	—N/a	—N/a	—N/a	None held (Note: Cancelled due to the COVID-19 pandemic.)	3rd–4th
2021	G2 Esports	LEC	—N/a	—N/a	3rd	4th	—N/a	—N/a	—N/a	Did not qualify	
2022	Fnatic	LEC	—N/a	—N/a	3rd	3rd	—N/a	—N/a	—N/a	Did not qualify	9th–10th
2023	Fnatic	LEC	—N/a	9th	—	—	2nd	—N/a	—N/a	—	
2024	Team Heretics	LEC	—N/a	7th	5th	7th	Did not qualify	—N/a	—N/a	Did not qualify	
2025	The Ruddy Sack	NLC	—N/a	5th	—	—	—N/a	—N/a	—		
2026	SK Gaming	LEC	11th	—N/a	8th	8th	—N/a	—N/a	Did not qualify		

== Awards and honors ==
International

- One-time Mid-Season Invitational champion – 2019

Regional

- Two-time Rift Rivals champion – 2018, 2019

LEC

- Four-time LEC champion – Spring 2019, Summer 2019, Spring 2020, Summer 2020
- Five-time LEC 1st All-Pro Team – Summer 2016, Spring 2018, Summer 2018, Summer 2019, Spring 2021
- Two-time LEC 2nd All-Pro Team – Spring 2019, Summer 2020
- Three-time LEC 3rd All-Pro Team – Spring 2020, Summer 2021, Spring 2022

EU CS

- One-time EU CS champion – Summer 2015

Tournaments

- Gaming.dk LoL Liga Season 4 – 2013
- NetParty Fyn 14 – 2013
- League One European Cup: Week 2 – 2015
- League of Sharks – Spring 2015
- SCAN Invitational 2 – 2015
- DreamHack Valencia – 2015
- Insomnia55 – Summer 2015
