= Luka Perković =

Luka Perković may refer to:

- Luka Perković (gamer) (born 1998), Croatian League of Legends player best known as Perkz
- Luka Perković (writer) (1900–1948), Croatian novelist and poet, one time president of the Croatian Writers' Association
