= Challenger Series =

Challenger Series may refer to:

- ATP Challenger Tour, a series of international men's professional tennis tournaments.
- ISU Challenger Series, a series of international figure skating competitions.
- League of Legends Challenger Series (CS), two professional League of Legends leagues (EU CS) and (NA CS), in Europe and North America, which are the second highest level of play in those regions
