= North American League =

North American League may refer to:

- North American League (baseball), an independent professional baseball league based in San Ramon, California
- North American Soccer League (2011–2017), a D2 professional soccer league from 2011 to 2017
- North American Soccer League (1968–1984), a D1 professional soccer league from 1968 to 1984

== See also ==
- North American League of Legends Challenger Series
- North American League of Legends Championship Series
