= Perkz =

Croatian professional League of Legends player

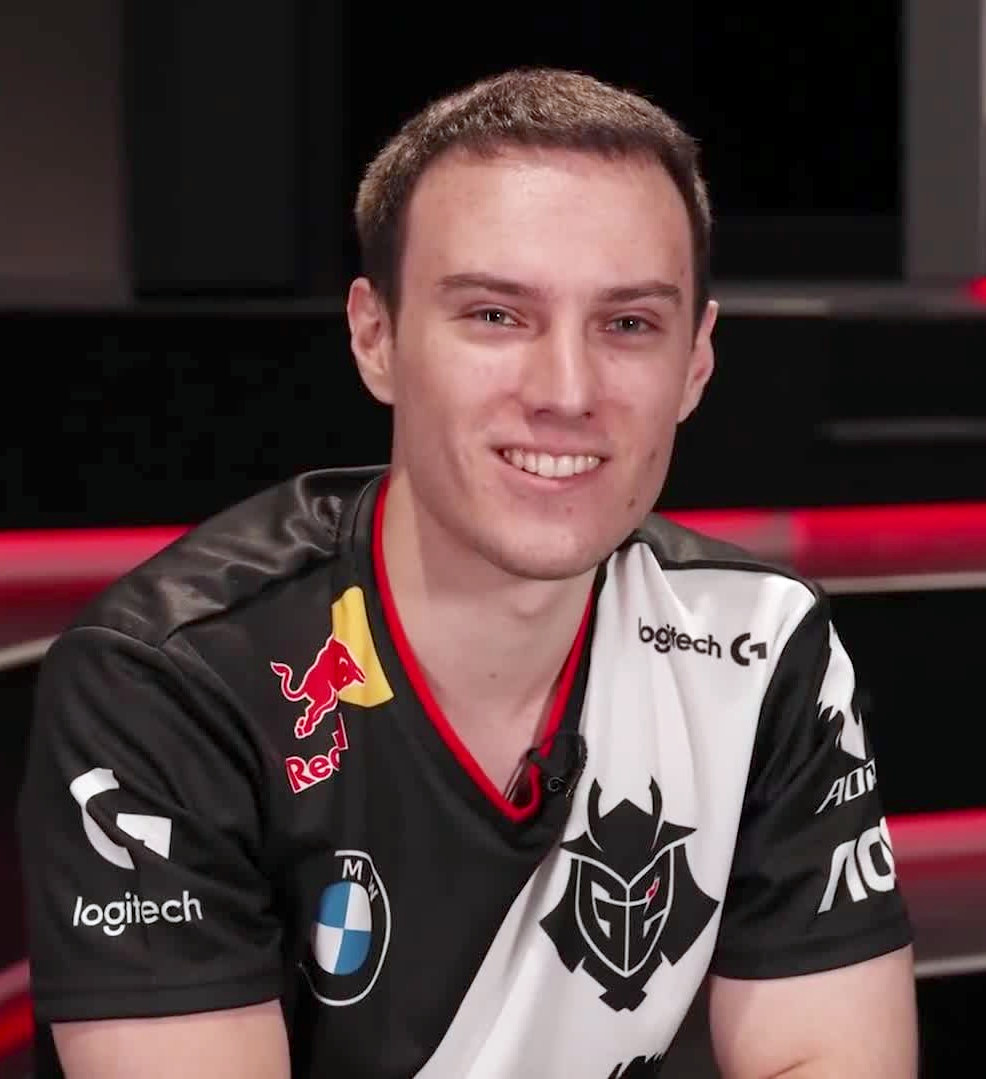
- Perkz with G2 Esports in 2020

Personal information
- Name: Luka Perković
- Nickname: Uma Jan
- Born: 30 September 1998 (age 28); Zagreb, Croatia
- Nationality: Croatian

Career information
- Games: League of Legends
- Playing career: 2014–2025
- Role(s): Mid (2014–2018, 2020–2024); AD Carry (2019–2020); Top (2025)
- Coaching career: July–November 2026

Team history

As player:
- 2014: GSI Gaming
- 2015: Gamers2
- 2015: Millenium
- 2015–2020: G2 Esports (Note: Known as Gamers2 in early 2015.)
- 2021: Cloud9
- 2022–2023: Team Vitality
- 2024: Team Heretics
- 2025: The Ruddy Sack

As coach:
- 2026: G2 Esports

Career highlights and awards
- MSI champion (2019); 2× Rift Rivals champion (2018, 2019); 8× LEC champion; 4× LEC 1st All-Pro Team; LCS champion; 1× LCS 1st All-Pro Team

Luka Perković (born 30 September 1998), better known as Perkz (previously stylized as PERKZ and PerkZ), is a Croatian former professional League of Legends player and coach. Throughout his career, he has been a mid laner, AD carry, top laner and a coach. He is widely regarded as one of the greatest western players in League of Legends history.

From 2015 to 2020, Perkz was a member of G2 Esports, when the team became the first European organization to win the Mid-Season Invitational in 2019. He reached the World Championship final in 2019. He has won 8 LEC titles, the 5th highest of any player.

== Career ==
=== 2014 season ===
Perkz's first professional team was GSI Gaming, which he joined midway through the 2013 season. With the team, he competed at DreamHack Summer 2014, though they did not make it past the group stage. Perkz and GSI Gaming won EpicGear Cup 16, and placed second in EpicGear Cup 17 before the team disbanded later on in the year.

=== 2015 season ===
At the start of 2015, Perkz joined Gamers2. He participated at International Invitational Tournament 4 with the team, and later the EU CS Spring Qualifier r as along with beansu, Obvious, Kobbe and kaSing. Gamers2 were beaten by Team Nevo in the final of their qualifier bracket. Perkz then left the team, joining Millenium soon after.

With Millenium, Perkz and the roster finished 2nd at Gamers Assembly 2015 behind only Origen. Not long after, Perkz officially left the team.

In May 2015, it was announced that Perkz would be rejoining Gamers2, who had retained their Challenger Series spot for the EUCS Summer Season. In October, Gamers2 rebranded themselves to G2 Esports.

=== 2016 season ===
G2 started strong in their first year as a part of the EU LCS. They finished the split in first place with a record of 15–3. In the playoffs, Perkz and G2 defeated established franchises Fnatic and Origen, 3–1 both times, to win the season and secure an invitation to 2016 Mid–Season Invitational.

Going into MSI, G2 Esports was not expected to win, with Korean representatives, SK Telecom T1 favored ahead of them, but were still expected to perform well. However, the team lost their first four games of the round robin and ultimately finished in fifth place out of six teams, and were eliminated from the tournament. This placement meant that Europe would forfeit their Pool 1 seed at the World Championship. In a statement published partway through the second day of play, G2 stated that their players had taken vacation time after a "rigorous Spring Split”. AD carry Emperor later stated that there had been an internal conflict within the team one day prior to the start of the event.

=== 2019 season ===
In 2019 Caps was traded from Fnatic to G2, resulting in two mid lane players on the same team. Perkz swapped to the AD Carry position, replacing his teammate Hjarnan. G2's 2019 season was very successful, with the team winning the Mid-Season Invitational, and making it to the 2019 League of Legends World Championship finals, where Perkz and the rest of G2 were defeated by FunPlus Phoenix.

=== 2020 season ===
For the 2020 season, Perkz moved back to the mid lane, swapping positions with Caps. After the spring split had ended, Perkz swapped back to the bot lane.

In the middle of the LEC 2020 Summer Split, Perkz had to take a break because of stress. Perkz came back after a short break, and G2 Esports managed to once again win the LEC, and qualify for Worlds 2020.

At the 2020 League of Legends World Championship, G2 Esports were eliminated in the semifinals by the eventual champions, Damwon Gaming. This marked the third strait year G2 has finished fourth or better at Worlds. Following the loss, Perkz and G2 decided to part ways in November 2020.

=== 2021 season ===
On November 20, 2020 Cloud9 announced Perkz as their new midlaner, replacing Nisqy. On Cloud9, Perkz reached the lock-in finals, and led Cloud9 to a first place finish in the regular season, as well as first place in the 2021 LCS MidSeason Showdown. Perkz was awarded Player of the Series for his performance in the finals against Team Liquid. Perkz is now the second player to have ever won both a LEC and a LCS championship title, along with his teammate Jesper "Zven" Svenningsen.

At the 2021 League of Legends World Championship Perkz and C9 reached the quarterfinals, where they lost to Gen.G.

== Seasons overview ==
Year	Team	Domestic					Regional	International		
Year	Team	League	Split				Rift Rivals	First Stand	Mid-Season Invitational	World Championship
Year	Team	League	Winter	Spring	Summer	Season Finals	Rift Rivals	First Stand	Mid-Season Invitational	World Championship
2015	Gamers2	EU CS	—N/a	—	3rd	—N/a	—N/a	—N/a	—	
2016	G2 Esports	EU LCS	—N/a	1st	1st	—N/a	—N/a	—N/a	5th	13th–16th
2017	G2 Esports	EU LCS	—N/a	1st	1st	—N/a	2nd	—N/a	2nd	9th–11th
2018	G2 Esports	EU LCS	—N/a	2nd	6th	—N/a	1st	—N/a	Did not qualify	3rd–4th
2019	G2 Esports	LEC	—N/a	1st	1st	—N/a	1st	—N/a	1st	2nd
2020	G2 Esports	LEC	—N/a	1st	1st	—N/a	—N/a	—N/a	None held (Note: Cancelled due to the COVID-19 pandemic.)	3rd–4th
2021	Cloud9	LCS	—N/a	1st	3rd	—N/a	—N/a	—N/a	5th	5th–8th
2022	Team Vitality	LEC	—N/a	5th	7th	—N/a	—N/a	—N/a	Did not qualify	
2023	Team Vitality	LEC	5th	3rd	10th	Did not qualify	—N/a	—N/a	Did not qualify	
2024	Team Heretics	LEC	7th	—	—	—	—N/a	—N/a	—	
2025	The Ruddy Sack	NLC	5th	—	—	—N/a	—N/a	—		

== Awards and honors ==
International

- One-time Mid-Season Invitational champion – 2019

Regional

- Two-time Rift Rivals champion – 2018, 2019

LEC

- Eight-time LEC champion – Spring 2016, Summer 2016, Spring 2017, Summer 2017, Spring 2019, Summer 2019, Spring 2020, Summer 2020
- Four-time LEC 1st All-Pro Team – Spring 2016, Spring 2017, Summer 2019, Spring 2020
- Three-time LEC 2nd All-Pro Team – Summer 2016, Spring 2018, Summer 2018
- One-time LEC 3rd All-Pro Team – Summer 2017
- Rookie of the Split – Spring 2016

LCS

- One-time LCS champion – Spring 2021
- One-time LCS 1st All-Pro Team – Spring 2021

Tournaments

- EpicGear Cup 16 – 2014
