= MAD Lions =

Spanish esports organisation

- Short name: MAD
- Divisions: League of Legends; Valorant
- Founded: 31 August 2017
- Folded: 6 December 2024
- League: LEC
- Based in: Madrid, Spain
- Championships: 3× LEC (Spring 2021, Summer 2021, Spring 2023)
- Parent group: OverActive Media
- Website: madlions.com

MAD Lions (Note: Known as MAD Lions E.C. until November 2019. "MAD" is short for Madrid, but the name "Madrid Lions" has never been used by the organisation. Also known as MAD Lions KOI during 2024.) was a Spanish esports organisation owned by OverActive Media. Its main League of Legends team, which was rebranded from Splyce, competed in Europe's top-level league for the game, the LEC. Its secondary League of Legends team competed in Spain's SuperLiga, the top three teams of which qualify for the prestigious European Masters tournament.

MAD Lions won their first LEC title on 11 April 2021, after reverse sweeping Rogue in the spring finals.

On December 6, 2024, the MAD Lions brand completed the definitive merger under the Movistar KOI brand.

== League of Legends ==
=== History ===
==== Before joining the LEC ====
MAD Lions was founded on 31 August 2017 to compete in the Spanish professional League of Legends scene. The team began competing in Spain's SuperLiga Orange (formerly División de Honor) and grew in popularity as they consistently topped the region, qualifying for the prestigious European Masters tournament thrice and winning the tournament in their second appearance in summer 2018. The organisation also began expanding globally, sponsoring several teams in Latin America under the MAD Lions brand.

In May 2019 it was announced that MAD Lions had been acquired by OverActive Media. The company later announced its intentions to dissolve its other esports subsidiary, Splyce, by the end of the year. Splyce's League of Legends team subsequently assumed the MAD Lions brand in November 2019, while MAD Lions' original League of Legends team renamed to MAD Lions Madrid.

==== 2020 season ====
MAD Lions' inaugural LEC roster for the 2020 Spring Split consisted of four rookies—Orome, Shad0w, Carzzy, and Kaiser—and one former member of Splyce, Humanoid. Despite expectations that the team would only qualify for the losers' bracket of playoffs or not qualify at all, MAD Lions finished fourth in the regular season and secured a spot in the winners' bracket. G2 Esports selected MAD Lions as their opponent for the first round of playoffs, and were expected to win against MAD Lions as favourites to win the spring season. However, MAD Lions were able to defeat G2 Esports in a close-fought series, knocking the latter into the losers' bracket. MAD Lions were then themselves knocked down to the losers' bracket after being swept by Fnatic in the second round of the winners' bracket. MAD Lions' inaugural split ended when they lost to a more well-prepared G2 Esports in the final round of the losers' bracket.

MAD Lions retained their entire spring lineup for the 2020 LEC Summer Split. The team finished second in the regular season and began playoffs in the winners' bracket. MAD Lions lost their rematch against G2 Esports in the first round of the winners' bracket, and were forced to climb through the losers' bracket once again. MAD Lions managed to defeat Schalke in the second round of the losers' bracket, but were swept by Rogue in the third round and ended fourth.

MAD Lions' fourth-place finish in the summer split qualified them for the play-in stage of the 2020 World Championship. As a team from a major region, MAD Lions was expected by many analysts to qualify for the main event. However, MAD Lions placed fourth out of five teams in their group and were eliminated from Worlds contention by Turkey's SuperMassive in the knockout stage.

==== 2021 season ====
Prior to the 2021 LEC Spring Split, Orome and Shad0w were replaced with Armut and Elyoya respectively, both of whom were making their debut in the LEC. Armut was previously the top laner for SuperMassive, the team which eliminated MAD Lions from the 2020 World Championship. MAD Lions finished third in the regular season and began in the winners' bracket once again. MAD Lions defeated Rogue in the first round of the winners' bracket, qualifying for the second round. There, MAD Lions defeated G2 Esports and advanced to their first LEC finals. Despite trailing 0–2, MAD Lions managed to reverse sweep Rogue in a closely fought finals, claiming their first LEC title.

=== Roster ===
==== Male ====
MAD Lions KOI League of Legends roster
Players
Coaches

Role	Handle	Name	Nationality
Top	Myrwn	Pastor Villarejo, Alex	Spain
Jungle	Elyoya	Prades Batalla, Javier	Spain
Mid	Fresskowy	Przewoźnik, Bartłomiej	Poland
Bot	Supa	Martínez García, David	Spain
Support	Alvaro	Fernández del Amo, Álvaro	Spain

Head coach

Tomás "Melzhet" Campelos Fernández

Assistant coach(es)

- Quentin "Zeph" Viguié

Legend:
- (I) Inactive
- (S) Suspended
- Substitute
- (injured) Injury / Illness

Roster updated 30 June 2024.

==== Female ====
MAD Lions KOI League of Legends roster
Players
Coaches

Role	Handle	Name	Nationality
Top	Emolga	Ortiz, Lorena	Spain
Jungle	Paradox	Stengel, Selina	Germany
Mid	Dragon	de los Ángeles Zarate, María	Argentina
Bot	Sakkuromi	Nieto Fonte, Sonia	Spain
Support	Miyuuri	Lupión, Carla	Spain
Jungle	Delicate	Giannopoulou, Chara	Greece

Head coach

Jasmin "Jay" Ajanovic

Legend:
- (I) Inactive
- (S) Suspended
- Substitute
- (injured) Injury / Illness

Roster updated 13 July 2024.

=== Seasons overview ===
Year		League of Legends EMEA Championship							Rift Rivals	Mid-Season Invitational	World Championship
Year		P	W	T	L	W–L%	Pos.	Playoffs	Rift Rivals	Mid-Season Invitational	World Championship
As Splyce
2016	Spring	18	5	—N/a	13	.278	8th	Did not qualify	—N/a	Did not qualify	13th–16th
2016	Summer	18	9	6	3	.667	2nd	2nd	—N/a	Did not qualify	13th–16th
2017	Spring	13	7	—N/a	6	.538	3rd	5th	Did not qualify	Did not qualify	Did not qualify
2017	Summer	13	8	—N/a	5	.615	3rd	5th	Did not qualify	Did not qualify	Did not qualify
2018	Spring	18	11	—N/a	7	.611	3rd	3rd	1st	Did not qualify	Did not qualify
2018	Summer	18	9	—N/a	9	.500	6th	5th	1st	Did not qualify	Did not qualify
2019	Spring	18	11	—N/a	7	.611	4th	4th	Did not qualify	Did not qualify	5th–8th
2019	Summer	18	12	—N/a	6	.667	3rd	6th	Did not qualify	Did not qualify	5th–8th
As MAD Lions
2020	Spring	18	11	—N/a	7	.611	4th	3rd	—N/a	Not held (Note: Cancelled due to the COVID-19 pandemic.)	19th
2020	Summer	18	12	—N/a	6	.667	2nd	4th	—N/a	Not held	19th
2021	Spring	18	10	—N/a	8	.556	3rd	1st	—N/a	3rd–4th	5th–8th
2021	Summer	18	12	—N/a	6	.667	3rd	1st	—N/a	3rd–4th	5th–8th
2022	Spring	18	8	—N/a	10	.444	7th	Did not qualify	—N/a	Did not qualify	17th–18th
2022	Summer	18	12	—N/a	6	.667	2nd	4th	—N/a	Did not qualify	17th–18th
2023	Winter	9	7	—N/a	2	.778	2nd	2nd	—N/a	7th–8th	12th–14th
2023	Spring	9	3	—N/a	6	.333	8th	1st	—N/a	7th–8th	12th–14th
2023	Summer	9	4	—N/a	5	.444	7th	7th	—N/a	7th–8th	12th–14th
2023	Season Finals	3	1	—N/a	2	.333	2nd	3rd	—N/a	7th–8th	12th–14th
As MAD Lions KOI
2024	Winter	9	5	—N/a	4	.556	4th	2nd	—N/a	Did not qualify	15th–16th
2024	Spring	9	4	—N/a	5	.444	7th	6th	—N/a	Did not qualify	15th–16th
2024	Summer	9	2	—N/a	7	.222	8th	8th	—N/a	Did not qualify	15th–16th
2024	Season Finals	3	1	—N/a	2	.333	4th	3rd	—N/a	Did not qualify	15th–16th
Totals		302	164	6	141	.537	(2016–2024, includes only regular season)				

== Valorant ==
=== Roster ===
==== Female ====
MAD Lions KOI Valorant roster
Players
Coaches

Handle	Name	Nationality
Alessia	Crisafo, Alessia	Spain
Nidxvilco	Dobrovolskyy, Nicole	Ukraine
didii	del Moral de la Torre, Lidia	Spain
Lil Bob	-	Germany
ikyoo	-	South Korea

Head coach

Adrián "Jedry" García Saiz

Legend:
- (I) Inactive
- (S) Suspended
- Substitute
- (injured) Injury / Illness

Roster updated 9 September 2024.

== Notes ==
Awards and achievements
Preceded by G2 Esports	League of Legends European Championship winner Spring 2021, Summer 2021	Succeeded by G2 Esports
