= 2019 LEC season =

- League: LEC
- Sport: League of Legends
- Duration: January 18 - April 14 (Spring); June 7 - September 8 (Summer); September 13–15 (Regional Finals)
- Teams: 10

Spring
- Champions: G2 Esports
- Runners-up: Origen
- Season MVP: Rasmus "Caps" Winther (G2 Esports)

Summer
- Champions: G2 Esports
- Runners-up: Fnatic
- Season MVP: Marcin "Jankos" Jankowski (G2 Esports)

Regional Finals
- Champions: Fnatic
- Runners-up: Splyce

LEC seasons
- ← 2018 2020 →

The 2019 LEC season is the seventh season, and the first under new branding, of the League of Legends European Championship (LEC), a professional esports league for the MOBA PC game League of Legends, following its rebranding in late 2018.

== League changes ==
In November 2018, Riot Games rebranded from the European League of Legends Championship Series to the League of Legends European Championship (LEC). The newly franchised competition was set to commence on January 18, 2019, with the announcement of 10 final franchise partners for the 2019 season. The returning teams included Fnatic, FC Schalke 04, G2 Esports, Misfits Gaming, Splyce, and Team Vitality. The four new organizations included Excel Esports, Rogue, SK Gaming, and Origen.

Riot Games began accepting applications with buy-in prices set at €8 million for existing teams and €10.5 million for new entrants. The selection process for the league involved a three-stage application process running through December 2018. Interested parties submitted applications outlining finances, team plans, and ownership background. Selected applicants underwent in-person reviews with Riot Games representatives.

The revenue pool, consisting of league sponsorship and media rights, individual team sponsorships, and merchandising revenue, were distributed among Riot Games, teams, and players. Players received 35% of the revenue pool to fund their salaries, with the excess distributed among them. Riot Games utilized 32.5% for broadcast production, live events, and other expenses, while the remaining 32.5% will go to the teams, part of which was equally distributed. The minimum player salary was also increased from $29,791 to $74,749 yearly. Riot Games planned to introduce a player development platform, providing support for aspiring professionals in areas like personal finance and healthcare.

== Spring ==
=== Regular season ===
| Pos | Team | Pld | W | L | PCT | Qualification |
|---|---|---|---|---|---|---|
| 1 | G2 Esports | 18 | 13 | 5 | .722 | Upper bracket finals |
| 2 | Origen | 18 | 12 | 6 | .667 | Upper bracket finals |
| 3 | Fnatic | 18 | 11 | 7 | .611 | Lower bracket quarterfinals |
| 4 | Splyce | 18 | 11 | 7 | .611 | Lower bracket quarterfinals |
| 5 | Team Vitality | 18 | 10 | 8 | .556 | Lower bracket quarterfinals |
| 6 | SK Gaming | 19 | 10 | 9 | .526 | Lower bracket quarterfinals |
| 7 | Schalke 04 | 19 | 9 | 10 | .474 | |
| 8 | Misfits Gaming | 18 | 8 | 10 | .444 | |
| 9 | Excel Esports | 18 | 5 | 13 | .278 | |
| 10 | Rogue | 18 | 2 | 16 | .111 | |

Source: LoL Esports

=== Playoffs ===
Round 1
3 | Fnatic | 3
5 | Team Vitality | 0
4 | Splyce | 3
6 | SK Gaming | 1

Round 2
1 | G2 Esports | 3
2 | Origen | 0
3 | Fnatic | 3
4 | Splyce | 1

Preliminary final
2 | Origen | 3
3 | Fnatic | 1

Grand final
1 | G2 Esports | 3
2 | Origen | 0

==== Final standings ====
| Pos | Team | Qualification |
|---|---|---|
| 1 | G2 Esports | 2019 Mid-Season Invitational Main Event 2019 Rift Rivals |
| 2 | Origen | 2019 Rift Rivals |
| 3 | Fnatic | 2019 Rift Rivals |
| 4 | Splyce | |
| 5–6 | SK Gaming | |
| 5–6 | Team Vitality | |

=== Awards ===
- 1st Team All-Pro:
  - T Cabochard, Team Vitality
  - J Jankos, G2 Esports
  - M Caps, G2 Esports
  - B Kobbe, Splyce
  - S Mikyx, G2 Esports
- 2nd Team All-Pro:
  - T Wunder, G2 Esports
  - J Selfmade, SK Gaming
  - M Nukeduck, Origen
  - B Upset, Schalke 04
  - S Hylissang, Fnatic
- 3rd Team All-Pro:
  - T Alphari, Origen
  - J Broxah, Fnatic
  - M Jiizuke, Team Vitality
  - B Rekkles, Fnatic
  - S Mithy, Origen
- Most Valuable Player: Caps, G2 Esports
- Rookie of the Split: Selfmade, G2 Esports
- Coach of the Split: Guilhoto, Origen

== Summer ==
=== Regular season ===
| Pos | Team | Pld | W | L | PCT | Qualification |
|---|---|---|---|---|---|---|
| 1 | G2 Esports | 18 | 15 | 3 | .833 | Upper bracket finals |
| 2 | Fnatic | 18 | 14 | 4 | .778 | Upper bracket finals |
| 3 | Splyce | 18 | 12 | 6 | .667 | Lower bracket quarterfinals |
| 4 | Schalke 04 | 18 | 11 | 7 | .611 | Lower bracket quarterfinals |
| 5 | Rogue | 18 | 7 | 11 | .389 | Lower bracket quarterfinals |
| 6 | Team Vitality | 19 | 8 | 11 | .421 | Lower bracket quarterfinals |
| 7 | SK Gaming | 19 | 7 | 12 | .368 | |
| 8 | Origen | 18 | 7 | 11 | .389 | |
| 9 | Misfits Gaming | 18 | 6 | 12 | .333 | |
| 10 | Excel Esports | 18 | 4 | 14 | .222 | |

Source: LoL Esports

=== Playoffs ===
Round 1
3 | Splyce | 0
5 | Rogue | 3
4 | Schalke 04 | 3
6 | Team Vitality | 1

Round 2
1 | G2 Esports | 3
2 | Fnatic | 2
5 | Rogue | 1
4 | Schalke 04 | 3

Preliminary final
2 | Fnatic | 3
4 | Schalke 04 | 0

Grand final
1 | G2 Esports | 3
2 | Fnatic | 2

==== Final standings ====
| Pos | Team | Qualification |
|---|---|---|
| 1 | G2 Esports | 2019 Worlds Main Event |
| 2 | Fnatic | |
| 3 | Schalke 04 | |
| 4 | Rogue | |
| 5–6 | Splyce | |
| 5–6 | Team Vitality | |

=== Awards ===
- 1st Team All-Pro:
  - T Wunder, G2 Esports
  - J Jankos, G2 Esports
  - M Caps, G2 Esports
  - B Perkz, G2 Esports
  - S Mikyx, G2 Esports
- 2nd Team All-Pro:
  - T Alphari, Origen
  - J Xerxe, Splyce
  - M Humanoid, Splyce
  - B Upset, Schalke 04
  - S Hylissang, Fnatic
- 3rd Team All-Pro:
  - T Bwipo, Fnatic
  - J Broxah, Fnatic
  - M Nemesis, Fnatic
  - B Rekkles, Fnatic
  - S IgNar, Schalke 04
- Most Valuable Player: Jankos, G2 Esports
- Rookie of the Split: Inspired, Rogue
- Coach of the Split: Grabbz, G2 Esports

== Regional Finals ==
=== Playoffs ===
Round 1
Origen | 2
Splyce | 3

Round 2
Schalke 04 | 0
Splyce | 3

Final
Fnatic | 3
Splyce | 0

==== Final standings ====
| Pos | Team | Qualification |
|---|---|---|
| 1 | Fnatic | Worlds 2019 Main Event |
| 2 | Splyce | Worlds 2019 Play-In stage |
| 3 | Schalke 04 | |
| 4 | Origen | |
