= Rekkles =

Swedish League of Legends player (born 1996)

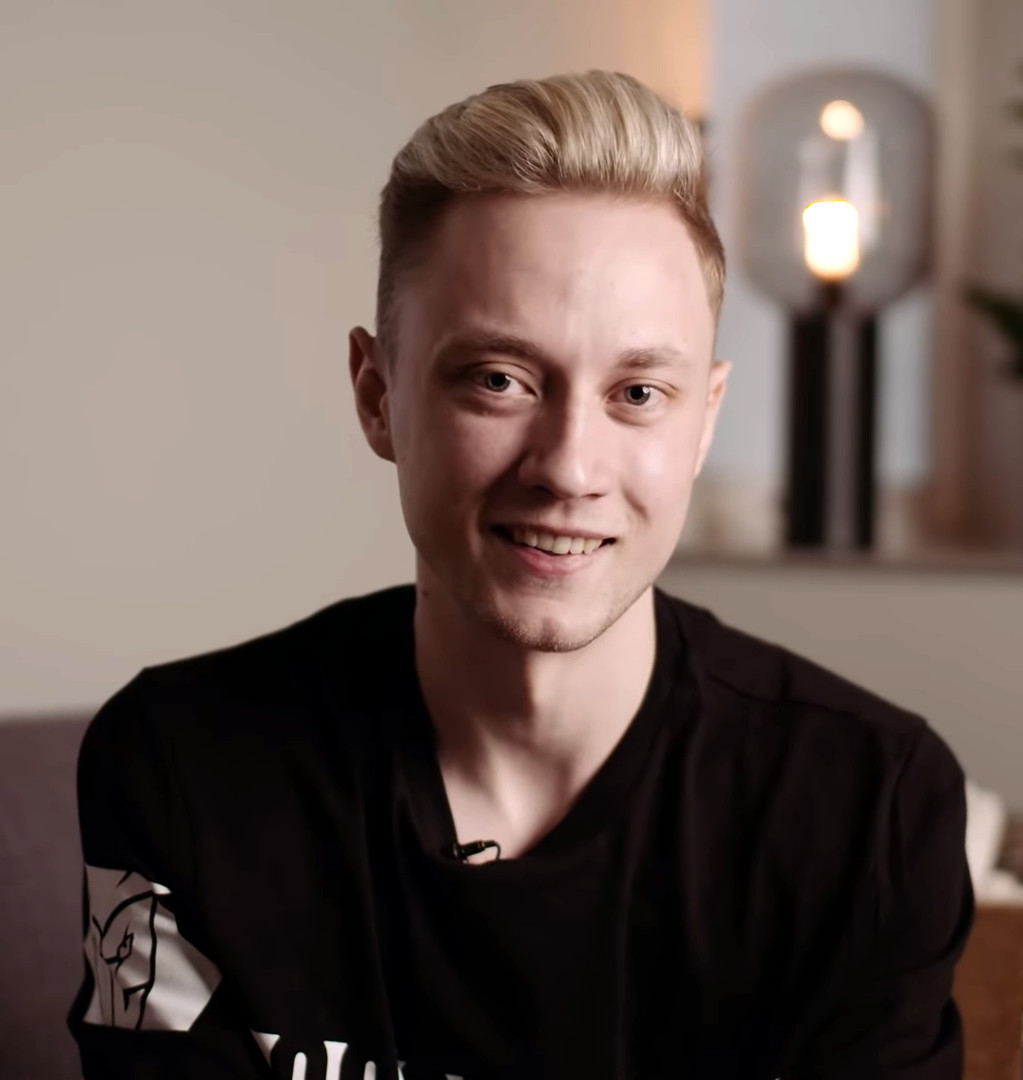
- Rekkles in 2020

Personal information
- Name: Carl Martin Erik Larsson
- Born: 20 September 1996 (age 30); Älvängen, Sweden
- Nationality: Swedish

Current team
- Team: Witchcraft
- Role: Support
- Game: League of Legends
- League: Northern League of Legends Championship

Career information
- Playing career: 2012–present
- Role: AD Carry, Support

Team history
- 2012–2014: Fnatic
- 2015: Alliance (Note: Rebranded to Elements in 2015.)
- 2015–2020: Fnatic
- 2021: G2 Esports
- 2022: Karmine Corp
- 2023: Fnatic
- 2024: T1 Esports Academy
- 2024–2026: Los Ratones
- 2026: Witchcraft

Career highlights and awards
- World champion (2024); 4× LEC champion; 4× LEC MVP; 3x LEC Finals MVP; LEC Play-offs MVP; 6× LEC First All-Pro Team; LEC Second All-Pro Team; 4× LEC Third All-Pro Team; 2× Rift Rivals champion; 3× EMEA Masters champion; 3× NLC champion; NLC First All-Pro Team; NLC Second All-Pro Team

Carl Martin Erik Larsson (born 20 September 1996), better known as Rekkles (pronounced "reckless"), is a Swedish professional League of Legends player who most recently played for Witchcraft at EMEA Masters. He has previously played for Fnatic, Alliance, G2 Esports, Karmine Corp, T1 Esports Academy, and Los Ratones.

He is considered by some to be the greatest AD Carry player in European history, notable for being the first player to have reached both 1,000 and 2,000 kills in the LEC and the European player with the most pentakills (10).

Rekkles has appeared in 8 international S-tier tournaments: 7 times at the World Championship (6 as a starter, 1 as a stand-in) and once at MSI.

Rekkles has won four LEC titles, two Rift Rivals titles, three EMEA Masters titles and three Northern LoL Championship titles. He placed second in the 2018 World Championship with Fnatic, and he was a stand-in for T1's 2024 World Championship win, though he did not play any games.

== Professional career ==
=== Early career ===
Originally from Älvängen, near Gothenburg, he became interested in video games after he injured his cruciate ligament playing football.

His competitive career started at age 16 with the teams Playing Ducks and PAH. He was also as a substitute player for both Team BLACK and SK Gaming.

=== Fnatic/Copenhagen Wolves ===
In November 2012, Rekkles joined Fnatic. However, Rekkles was unable to participate in the 2013 EU LCS for their main roster, as he was too young. Because of this, a secondary Fnatic squad, Fnatic.Beta, was created around him. The team was disbanded after a few months. In May 2013, he started playing together with YoungBuck, Shook v2, cowTard, and Unlimited as PrideFC, and after the team got signed by Copenhagen Wolves, he agreed to continue playing with them as a stand-in. On 22 November in 2013, Rekkles officially retook the starting AD Carry position in Fnatic from puszu, as he was now old enough to participate in the EU LCS.

During the 4th season, Rekkles and Fnatic participated in the IEM Season VIII – World Championship, and ended up second place after losing to KT Rolster Bullets during the Grand Finale.

At the beginning of 2014 season Spring Split, Rekkles had a great professional debut and was voted game MVP often. They ended the Spring split in 2nd place, losing to SK Gaming, but secured themselves a spot in the Spring Playoffs. The whole team raised their game for the playoffs, and they emerged victorious after a win against Alliance in their semifinals matchup, and against SK Gaming in the Grand Final.

Fnatic endured a rocky start during the beginning of the Summer Split. They could not make it into the top 2 until Week 7 of the Split, while their main rivals Alliance were already at considerable distance ahead of them in the race for 1st place. Throughout the games, Rekkles managed to impress with his plays with Lucian and Vayne, picking up the Weekly MVP Award for Week 9.

=== Alliance/Elements ===
On 24 November 2014, Rekkles joined Alliance as starting AD carry, after many rumours. His first event with Alliance was IEM San Jose. During the IEM, Fnatic ended up in the semifinals, however team lost their match against Cloud9 and placed third after playing against Team SoloMid. During the event, Rekkles was nominated for the MVP award along with PowerOfEvil, Vizicsacsi, Kikis, and Sneaky; however the final vote went to Sneaky.

In order to comply with new LCS regulations, Alliance would have to change their name for the upcoming season. On 8 January, it was announced that the team had rebranded as Elements. The Spring Split was not a success for the team as they finished 7th place after making a number of roster changes. Therefore, the team did not made it to the playoffs, however they did qualify for the Summer Split.

=== Return to Fnatic ===
On 14 May 2015, Rekkles returned to Fnatic. He was a part of the Fnatic roster that managed to finish the regular season with an unbeaten 18–0 record and became the first team to achieve this in League Championship Series history. He won the EU LCS championship after beating Origen, 3–2.

In 2018, Fnatic won both the Spring and Summer Split EU LCS championships. In both splits, he secured a spot on the 1st All-Pro Team.

He was a part of the team's 2018 World Championship run, where they became the first Western team since Season 1 to advance to the finals.

=== G2 Esports ===
In November 2020, Rekkles' contract in Fnatic had expired. He decided to move on from Fnatic to G2 Esports, where the spot for AD Carry was open after Perkz had left the team to play in the LCS.

At the beginning of the Spring Season of the League of Legends European Championship, a song dedicated to Rekkles titled Reckless with my heart was released by the LEC casters. The single is about Rekkles abandoning Fnatic, where he was a long time veteran, to join G2 Esports.

After a poor 2021 season, G2 Esports' CEO Carlos "ocelote" Rodríguez placed Rekkles on the buyout market. His buyout price was listed at €1.5 million.

=== Karmine Corp ===
Rekkles settled in the European regional league LFL with team Karmine Corp. While playing in the LFL in his first split he finished 3rd and won the EU Masters tournament. However, in the following split, Karmine Corp finished 6th in the LFL, unable to qualify for the EU Masters Summer tournament.

=== Fnatic ===
After spending one year on the ERL scene with Karmine Corp, Rekkles returned to the LEC. On 15 December 2022, he officially signed with Fnatic, where he had previously played twice. During the Spring split, on 26 March 2023, Rekkles reached his 500th game in the LEC. After finishing 9th in the Winter Split and 8th in the Spring Split, Rekkles announces his decision to roleswap from AD Carry to Support. Following this roleswap, Fnatic benched Rekkles.

=== T1 Esports Academy ===
After less than 1 year in the LEC, he moved to T1 Esports Academy and became the first high profile player from the west to play in the Korean league. On 11 December 2023, T1 officially announced Esports Academy with Dal – Guwon – Poby – Smash – Rekkles, Cloud as substitutive support and GBM as head coach to play in the LCK Challengers League. Rekkles' debut match in the LCK CL broke the viewing record.

Rekkles was with T1 as a substitute at the 2024 League of Legends World Championship, which T1 won. However, he did not play any games during the tournament, therefore it is not counted as his achievement.

=== Los Ratones, Witchcraft ===
In November 2024, popular streamer Caedrel announced that he would be starting a professional team called "Los Ratones," serving as head coach. Rekkles would join the roster consisting of toplaner Simon "Thebausffs" Hofverberg, jungler Veljko "Velja" Čamdžić, midlaner Tim "Nemesis" Lipovšek and ADC Juš "Crownie" Marušič. The team went on to win the second season of the NNO Cup in 2024, the 2025 Winter Split of the Northern League of Legends Championship, and the EMEA Masters Winter Split in the same year. The team was also featured in the second edition of Red Bull League of Its Own at the Accor Arena in Paris, France. In the event, Los Ratones emerged victorious against 2024 World Champions T1 in a showmatch, which featured Lee "Faker" Sang-hyeok.

As part of Los Ratones, Rekkles would win three consecutive splits in the NLC, as well as EMEA Masters Winter and Spring. Their EMEA Masters success qualified Los Ratones to compete in the LEC for the LEC Versus tournament in the winter of 2026, marking Rekkles' return to tier one competition for the first time since being benched by Fnatic. Los Ratones failed to qualify for the LEC Versus playoffs on tiebreakers after a 5-6 record and later disbanded. 4 of the 5 members of the Los Ratones project, including Rekkles, would form the team "Witchcraft" to compete in the EMEA Masters Winter Split afterwards.

== Seasons overview ==
Team	Year	Domestic				First Stand Tournament	Mid-Season Invitational	World Championship
Team	Year	League	Winter	Spring	Summer	First Stand Tournament	Mid-Season Invitational	World Championship
Fnatic	2014	EU LCS	—N/a	1st	2nd	—N/a	—N/a	12th–13th
Alliance	2015	EU LCS	—N/a	7th	—N/a	—N/a	Did not qualify	—N/a
Fnatic	2015	EU LCS	—N/a	—N/a	1st	—N/a	—N/a	3rd–4th
Fnatic	2016	EU LCS	—N/a	3rd	5th–6th	—N/a	Did not qualify	Did not qualify
Fnatic	2017	EU LCS	—N/a	3rd	3rd	—N/a	Did not qualify	5th–8th
Fnatic	2018	EU LCS	—N/a	1st	1st	—N/a	3rd–4th	2nd
Fnatic	2019	LEC	—N/a	3rd	2nd	—N/a	Did not qualify	5th–8th
Fnatic	2020	LEC	—N/a	2nd	2nd	—N/a	Did not qualify	5th–8th
G2 Esports	2021	LEC	—N/a	3rd	4th	—N/a	Did not qualify	Did not qualify
Karmine Corp	2022	LFL	—N/a	3rd	6th	—N/a	Ineligible	Ineligible
Karmine Corp	2022	EMEA Masters	—N/a	1st	—N/a	—N/a	Ineligible	Ineligible
Fnatic	2023	LEC	9th	8th	—N/a	—N/a	Did not qualify	Did not qualify
T1 Esports Academy	2024	LCK CL	—N/a	9th	4th	—N/a	Ineligible	Ineligible
T1 Esports Academy	2024	Asia Star Challengers Invitational	—N/a	—N/a	4th	—N/a	Ineligible	Ineligible
Los Ratones	2025	NLC	1st	1st	1st	—N/a	Ineligible	Ineligible
Los Ratones	2025	EMEA Masters	1st	1st	3rd–4th	—N/a	Ineligible	Ineligible
Los Ratones	2026	LEC	9th	—N/a	—N/a	Did not qualify	—N/a	—N/a
Witchcraft	2026	NLC	—N/a	TBD	TBD	Ineligible	Ineligible	Ineligible
Witchcraft	2026	EMEA Masters	13th–20th	TBD	TBD	Ineligible	Ineligible	Ineligible

Other titles

- DreamHack Winter 2012 (Fnatic)
- Thor Open 2012 (Fnatic)
- DreamHack Summer 2013 (Copenhagen Wolves)
- Gfinity London 2013 (Copenhagen Wolves)

== Awards and honors ==
International

- One-time World champion – 2024 (as a stand-in)
- Two-time Rift Rivals champion – 2018, 2019

LEC

- Four-time LEC champion – Spring 2014, Summer 2015, Spring 2018, Summer 2018
- Four-time LEC season MVP – Summer 2014, Summer 2017, Spring 2018, Spring 2021
- Three-time LEC Finals MVP – Summer 2015, Spring 2018, Summer 2018
- One-time LEC Playoffs MVP – Spring 2014
- Six-time LEC First All-Pro Team – Summer 2015, Summer 2017, Spring 2018, Spring 2020, Spring 2021, Summer 2021
- One-time LEC Second All-Pro Team – Spring 2017
- Four-time LEC Third All-Pro Team – Summer 2016, Spring 2019, Summer 2019, Summer 2020

Other

- Three-time EMEA Masters champion – Spring 2022, Winter 2025, Spring 2025
- Three-time NLC champion – Winter 2025, Spring 2025, Summer 2025
- One-time NLC First All-Pro Team – Spring 2025
- One-time NLC Second All-Pro Team – Summer 2025
- Two-time DreamHack champion – Winter 2012, Summer 2013
- One-time Thor Open champion – 2012
- One-time Gfinity champion – London 2013
