= Caps (gamer) =

Danish League of Legends player

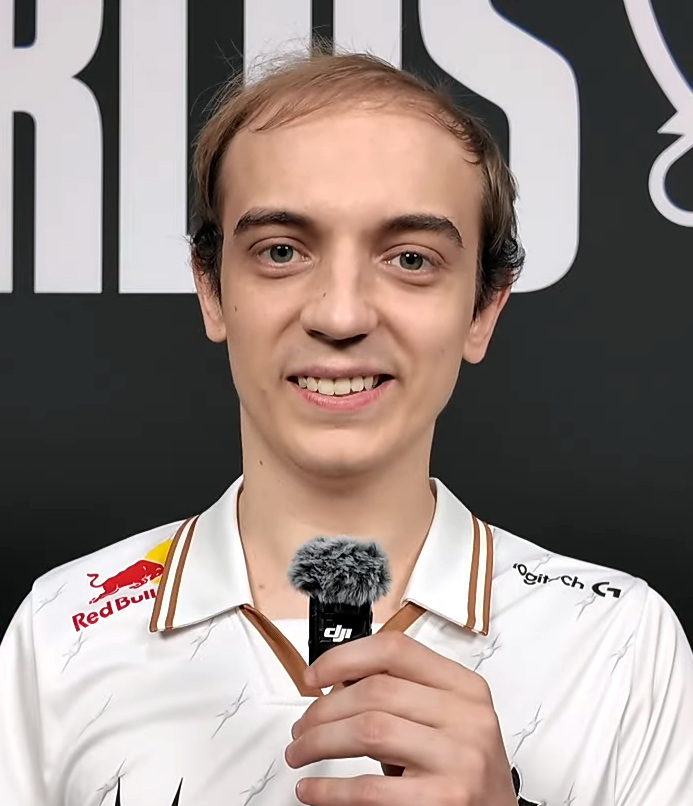
- Caps with G2 Esports in 2025

Personal information
- Name: Rasmus Borregaard Winther
- Nickname(s): Claps, Craps, Baby Faker, King of Europe, Demon Killer
- Born: 17 November 1999 (age 27)
- Nationality: Danish

Current team
- Team: G2 Esports
- Role: Mid laner
- Game: League of Legends
- League: LEC

Career information
- Playing career: 2015–present

Team history
- 2015: Enigma Esports
- 2016: Inspire eSports
- 2016: E-corp Gaming
- 2016: mousesports
- 2016: Nerv
- 2016: Dark Passage
- 2017–2018: Fnatic
- 2019–present: G2 Esports

Career highlights and awards
- MSI champion (2019); MSI Finals MVP; 2× Rift Rivals champion (2018, 2019); 18× LEC champion; 7× LEC Finals MVP; LEC Season MVP; 3× LEC Split MVP; 11× LEC 1st All-Pro Team; TCL champion; TCL Finals MVP; 2× World Championship Finalist (2018, 2019)

Rasmus Borregaard Winther (born 17 November 1999), better known as Caps, is a Danish professional League of Legends player for G2 Esports. Widely regarded as the greatest Western League of Legends player of all time, he has spent most of his career with G2, where he has become the team's franchise player.

Caps has won one MSI title, 18 LEC titles, two Rift Rivals titles and one TCL title. He is one of the few players to reach consecutive World Championship finals (2018 and 2019), though he lost both.

On 18 August 2026, he was inducted into the Hall of Legends, joining Faker and Uzi as the third inductee.

== Career ==
=== 2018 season ===
During the 2018 EU LCS season, Caps was part of team Fnatic in both the Spring and Summer Splits. He secured a spot on the 1st All-Pro Team. He earned the title of most valuable player (MVP) in the Summer Split that same year.

Caps' performance during the semifinals assisted Fnatic in achieving an uncontested win against competitor Cloud9, but the team subsequently lost to their group rival Invictus Gaming in the World Championship final.

=== 2019 season ===
Before the start of the 2019 season, Caps left Fnatic to join European esports organization G2 Esports. As Caps again achieved the title of MVP of the split, he became the first player ever to win back-to-back MVP titles on two different teams, in combination with his 2018 EU LCS Summer Split MVP achievement.

At the 2019 Mid-Season Invitational, G2 Esports defeated Team Liquid in the final, and Caps was rewarded with the 2019 MVP title.

In the League of Legends European Summer Split 2019 the past MSI 2019 champions returned to participate in the Summer split. Caps, as a member of G2, beat his previous team Fnatic 3–2 in a best-of-five match. In the 2019 League of Legends Worlds Championship, tournament, the team reached the finals but was defeated 3–0, with Caps' efforts rendered ineffective. His participation made Caps the first European player to ever play in, and lose, two Worlds Championship Finals in a row.

=== 2020 season ===
In the pre-season between 2019 and 2020, Caps switched his designation from 'mid lane' to 'bot lane'. Once again, Caps, as a member of G2, took first place in the regular season. G2 reached the finals and won against Fnatic 3–0. Caps swapped back to the mid lane position again, ahead of the LEC 2020 Summer Split.

In the LEC 2020 Summer Split, Caps and G2 Esports again earned the LEC Champion title and qualified for Worlds 2020.

=== 2021 season ===
At the end of 2021, Caps extended his contract with G2 through 2025.

=== 2023 season ===
Caps won the 2023 LEC Winter Split, which had recently changed its competitive format.

== Legacy ==
On August 16, 2026, Riot announced Caps as the third entry into the League of Legends' Hall of Legends, reflecting the substantial impact Caps has had on the e-sports scene. In this announcement, particular emphasis was placed on Caps' contribution to the European region's ability to compete with other regions at international tournaments.

He was officially inducted in a private ceremony at the Riot Games Arena in Berlin, Germany on August 18, 2026. A documentary on his career was released on September 10, 2026.

== Seasons overview ==
Year	Team	Domestic						Regional	International		
Year	Team	League	Split					Rift Rivals	First Stand	Mid-Season Invitational	World Championship
Year	Team	League	Versus	Winter	Spring	Summer	Season Finals	Rift Rivals	First Stand	Mid-Season Invitational	World Championship
2016	Nerv	EU CS	—N/a	—N/a	—	6th	—N/a	—N/a	—N/a	—	
2016	Dark Passage	TCL	—N/a	—	—N/a	1st	—N/a	—N/a	—N/a	—	
2017	Fnatic	EU LCS	—N/a	—N/a	3rd	3rd	—N/a	2nd	—N/a	Did not qualify	5th–8th
2018	Fnatic	EU LCS	—N/a	—N/a	1st	1st	—N/a	1st	—N/a	3rd–4th	2nd
2019	G2 Esports	LEC	—N/a	—N/a	1st	1st	—N/a	1st	—N/a	1st	2nd
2020	G2 Esports	LEC	—N/a	—N/a	1st	1st	—N/a	—N/a	—N/a	None held (Note: Cancelled due to the COVID-19 pandemic.)	3rd–4th
2021	G2 Esports	LEC	—N/a	—N/a	3rd	4th	—N/a	—N/a	—N/a	Did not qualify	Did not qualify
2022	G2 Esports	LEC	—N/a	—N/a	1st	2nd	—N/a	—N/a	—N/a	3rd–4th	11th–14th
2023	G2 Esports	LEC	—N/a	1st	4th	1st	1st	—N/a	—N/a	5th–6th	9th–11th
2024	G2 Esports	LEC	—N/a	1st	1st	1st	1st	—N/a	—N/a	4th	9th–11th
2025	G2 Esports	LEC	—N/a	2nd	2nd	1st	—N/a	—N/a	Did not qualify	7th–8th	5th–8th
2026	G2 Esports	LEC	1st	—N/a	1st	1st	—N/a	—N/a	2nd	4th	12th–14th

== Awards and honors ==
International

- One-time Mid-Season Invitational champion – 2019
- One-time Mid-Season Invitational Finals MVP – 2019

Regional

- Two-time Rift Rivals champion – 2018, 2019

LEC

- Eighteen-time LEC champion – Spring 2018, Summer 2018, Spring 2019, Summer 2019, Spring 2020, Summer 2020, Spring 2022, Winter 2023, Summer 2023, Season Finals 2023, Winter 2024, Spring 2024, Summer 2024, Season Finals 2024, Summer 2025, Versus 2026, Spring 2026, Summer 2026
- Seven-time LEC Finals MVP – Summer 2020, Spring 2022, Winter 2023, Season Finals 2023, Spring 2024, Summer 2024, Versus 2026
- One-time LEC Season MVP – 2024
- Three-time LEC Split MVP – Summer 2018, Spring 2019, Summer 2020
- Eleven-time LEC 1st All-Pro Team – Spring 2018, Summer 2018, Spring 2019, Summer 2019, Summer 2020, Spring 2021, Summer 2021, Winter 2023, Summer 2023, Winter 2024, Spring 2024
- Five-time LEC 2nd All-Pro Team – Summer 2017, Summer 2022, Spring 2023, Spring 2026, Summer 2026
- Two-time LEC 3rd All-Pro Team – Spring 2020, Spring 2025

TCL

- One-time TCL champion – Summer 2016
- One-time TCL Finals MVP – Summer 2016

Halls of Fame

- LoL Esports Hall of Legends inductee – 2026
