= Rogue (esports) =

Professional esports organization

- Short name: RGE
- Divisions: League of Legends; Rainbow Six Siege; Rocket League
- Founded: May 3, 2016
- Folded: June 13, 2025
- League: League of Legends European Championship (LEC), Rocket League Championship Series (RLCS)
- Based in: Berlin, Germany
- Location: Europe and the United States
- Colors: Blue and orange
- Official fan club: Rogue Nation
- Partners: Kia
- Parent group: ReKTGlobal
- Website: rogue-eu.myshopify.com

Rogue was a professional esports organization with teams competing across several different titles in Europe and the United States. It has two League of Legends teams based in Europe: a main team that participates in the League of Legends European Championship (LEC), and an academy team that participates in the Ultraliga. Team Rogue was founded by Franklin Villarreal, Derek Nelson and Carson Knuth in 2016, and acquired by now parent and management company ReKTGlobal and its partners in 2018. ReKTGlobal also owns the Call of Duty League team, the Carolina Royal Ravens. The organization is co-owned by prominent DJ Steve Aoki and YouTuber Vikram "Vikkstar123" Barn. Other Investors include Imagine Dragons, Rudy Gobert, Nicky Romero, Nick Gross and Landon Collins.

On October 6, 2022, Rogue announced a merger with KOI, an esports organisation owned by Ibai Llanos and Gerard Piqué. This will result in the existing Rogue teams rebranding to KOI. Following Infinite Reality's split with KOI in 2023, the team was reestablished.

== League of Legends ==
On November 20, 2018, Riot Games announced that Rogue would be one of ten franchise partners participating in the newly rebranded League of Legends European Championship (LEC).

For the 2019 LEC Spring Split, Rogue signed Kim "Profit" Jun-hyung, Mateusz "Kikis" Szkudlarek, Chres "Sencux" Laursen, Martin "HeaQ" Kordmaa and Kim "Wadid" Bae-in. On December 21, 2019, Rogue announced a partnership with Polish esports organization x-kom AGO in the Ultraliga, with Rogue remaining responsible for the team itself and x-kom AGO responsible for "establish(ing) a training presence in Warsaw and a dedicated marketing approach."

Following a 10th-place finish in their first split, Rogue promoted a majority of their academy team players for the 2019 LEC Summer split. This resulted in significant improvement, going from a 2–16 record in their first split to 7–11 in their second and qualifying for playoffs, where they lost a 1–3 game against Schalke 04 Esports. Building on this improvement, Hans Sama was brought in to replace Woolite. This saw the team compete for the top spot for the first time, notably placing first in the 2020 LEC Summer regular season. Despite a 2–3 loss against G2 Esports, Rogue qualified for the 2020 World Championship, where they finished 13–16th with just a single win in their group, against PSG Talon.

Ahead of 2021, Rogue saw several changes to their roster. Odoamne was signed from Schalke 04 Esports, while Trymbi was promoted from the academy team. This resulted in the team climbing up the ladder in the region, finishing second in the 2021 LEC Spring Split, losing against MAD Lions in the grand finals by being reverse swept in the finals. With the same roster for Summer, Rogue finished 3rd following a 1–3 loss against Fnatic, handing them the third seed at the 2021 League of Legends World Championship. They were put in the group along DWG KIA, FunPlus Phoenix, and Cloud9, where they finished third and were eliminated following a tiebreaker loss against Cloud9.

Inspired left the team in the off-season, joining North American side Evil Geniuses. French botlaner Hans Sama was acquired by Team Liquid. Joining as their replacements were Malrang from DWG KIA and Comp from Team Vitality. This roster would start off the season without losses in the first round robin stage but would place second in playoffs following an 0–3 loss against G2 Esports. In Summer, the team performed less strong in the regular season by placing 3rd, but managed to win their first LEC title by beating G2 Esports. They became the only Western team to make it to the 2022 League of Legends World Championship Knockout Stage, where they fell against JD Gaming to finish 5–8th in their final event.

On June 13, 2025, it was announced that Navi bought out Rogue's slot in the LEC league. At the time of the transition all players, coaches, and analysts were transferred to NAVI.

== Tom Clancy's Rainbow Six Siege ==
On August 24, 2017, Rogue signed the former roster of Vertical Gaming: John "Avian" Ackerly, Tyler "Ecl9pse" McMullin, George "KingGeorge" Kassa, Spencer "Slashug" Oliver, Austin "Yung" Trexler, and Tristan "Ranger" Perhson. Four days later, Yung left Rogue to return to Continuum; he was replaced with Bryan "Bryan" Agema on September 12. Kevin "Easilyy" Skokowski joined on December 22 after KingGeorge benched himself and eventually left due to family issues.

On March 19, 2018, Emilio "Geo" Leynez Cuevas joined the team to replace Avian. On September 3, Geo and Bryan both left Rogue and were later replaced by Aaron "Shuttle" Dugger and Seth "supr" Hoffman, though supr would leave two months later. Franklyn "VertcL" Cordero replaced Supr on November 28, three days after the latter left.

Rogue finished first at Dreamhack Valencia 2019 and qualified for the Six Major Raleigh 2019. At the Six Major 2019, Rogue placed ninth to twelfth after defeating Cyclops Athlete Gaming while losing to Team Secret twice in the group stage. After disappointing results at the Six Major Raleigh 2019, Ranger left the team and was replaced by the team's analyst, Eric "Reaper" Nohl. Taylor "Redeemer" Mayeur, an ex-Spacestation Gaming player, joined the team as a coach on October 9, 2019.

After the team was relegated to Challenger League, Ecl9pse, VertcL, and Slashug all left and joined different teams and causing the disbanding of the team. This left Rogue without a spot in Challenger League due to the rule requiring 3/5 players to retain a spot.

Shortly after though, on January 6, 2020, Rogue announced their buy out of the Vodafone Giants roster and the release of the remaining members of the North American roster. The buy out of the new roster had given them a spot in the European Rainbow 6 Pro League Season XI and the Six Invitational 2020. The team placed last at the Six Invitational 2020 after losing to Natus Vincere and eventual champions, Spacestation Gaming. In 2021, with the add of Prano they avoided relegations by placing fourth in EUL Stage 3 and they qualified for the Six Sweden Major. The victory over Team oNe in the quarterfinals gave Rogue a spot for the upcoming S.I. In August 2022 Rogue won against Faze Clan in the Six Major Berlin grand final, earning the EU region its first international Trophy since 2019.

On October 6th, 2022 it's announced via Twitter that Rogue will merge with KOI where the team would play under the KOI banner.November 3rd,2023 via Twitter it is announced that Rogue and KOI will split amicably. November 19th 2023 splits Rogue from KOI and acquires the full roster. A few months later on February 14th 2024 Rogue announces a departure from competitive Rainbow Six Siege.
