= Schalke 04 Esports =

Esports department of FC Schalke 04

Schalke 04
- Short name: S04
- Games: FIFA; League of Legends
- Founded: 16 May 2016; 10 years ago
- League: Prime League (since 2018); LEC (2016–2021)
- Based in: Adlershof, Berlin, Germany
- Parent group: FC Schalke 04

Schalke 04 Esports is the esports department of German football club FC Schalke 04. It has a FIFA division and a League of Legends division; the latter is a member of the Prime League, the European Regional League for League of Legends teams competing in Germany, Austria, and Switzerland.

Schalke formerly had a League of Legends team competing in the LEC (formerly the EU LCS), the top level of professional League of Legends in Europe. The team was relegated to the European League of Legends Challenger Series (EU CS) in the 2017 EU LCS Spring Promotion tournament but returned to the EU LCS after defeating the Ninjas in Pyjamas in the 2018 EU LCS Spring Promotion tournament.

In June 2021, FC Schalke 04 announced that it would sell its LEC slot to Team BDS, a Swiss esports organisation, for 26.5 million euros. The decision was made due to a combination of the coronavirus pandemic's impact on association football and the relegation of FC Schalke 04 to the second division of the Bundesliga after an exceptionally poor performance in the 2020–21 Bundesliga season, crippling the team's finances and pushing them to the brink of bankruptcy.

== History ==
In 2016, FC Schalke 04 opened an esports department and acquired the EU LCS spot of Elements, becoming the fourth football club to enter the professional League of Legends scene after Beşiktaş (which acquired the roster of Turkish team Aces High the previous year), Santos and Remo. The club also announced former Rot-Weiß Oberhausen and Sportfreunde Siegen midfielder and SK Gaming co-founder Tim Reichert as Head of eSport.

Schalke finished eighth in the 2016 Summer EU LCS and was relegated to the European League of Legends Challenger Series after losing a promotion match to Misfits Gaming. In December 2016, Steve and sprattel joined PSG eSports and left Schalke.

Schalke announced a new roster on 13 January 2017, with SmittyJ, loulex, SELFIE, Upset and Vander joining the team. SELFIE and Vander left Schalke on 30 April 2017. Memento, Caedrel and Norskeren joined Schalke on 22 May 2017, as Jungler, Mid Laner and Support respectively. Schalke also released loulex on the same day.

Schalke returned to the EU LCS on 25 August 2017, after defeating Ninjas in Pyjamas 3–0 in the 2018 EU LCS Spring Promotion tournament. On 30 September, Schalke released most of its roster: SmittyJ, Memento, Caedrel and Norskeren all announced their free agency via Twitter.

On 21 November 2017, Schalke announced the addition of Vizicsacsi, Pridestalker (now Pride), and Nukeduck to their roster as top laner, jungler, and mid laner respectively. Vander rejoined on the same day as Support. The team ended the 2018 EU LCS Spring Split in eighth place, but did not have to play in a promotion tournament as EUCS was abolished prior to the split. Amazing joined Schalke as starting jungler on 31 May 2018, after Pride was moved to a substitute role on 3 April. Schalke ended the 2018 EU LCS Summer Split in third place with a 12–6 record, qualifying the organisation for their first appearance in playoffs. The team managed to make it to the finals, but were defeated by Fnatic 1–3, and later failed to qualify for the 2018 World Championship after falling to G2 Esports 1–3 in the regional qualifiers.

Riot Games announced on 20 November 2018 that Schalke would be one of ten franchise partners participating in the newly rebranded League of Legends European Championship (LEC). Schalke completely revised their roster prior to the 2019 Spring LEC, signing veterans top laner Tamás "Vizicsacsi" Kiss, jungler Jonas "Memento" Elmarghichi, and support Lee "IgNar" Dong-geun, and rookie mid laner Felix "Abbedagge" Braun. Despite a strong start to the regular season, Schalke ended in seventh place with a 9–9 record, barely missing playoffs.

In preparation for the 2019 Summer LEC, Schalke signed 2016 Summer EU LCS MVP Kim "Trick" Gang-yun to replace Memento in the jungle. The team ended the regular season in fourth place with an 11–7 record, qualifying for playoffs. After defeating Team Vitality and Rogue in the first and second round of playoffs respectively, Schalke moved on to the third round in Athens, where they were swept by Fnatic.

Schalke 04 performed erratically in the 2020 LEC season. They came in 8th place of 10 in the Spring Split, and were considered a weaker team going into the Summer Split. Their initial results were poor, with an awful 1 win and 10 loss record, and were on the verge of being mathematically eliminated from playoff contention. Schalke proceeded to mount a dark horse "miracle run", however, after making adjustments to their jungle and bot lane positions. With Odoamne top lane, substitute jungler Gilius, Abbedagge in mid lane, and new bot laners Neon and Dreams, the team won out their remaining 7 games to narrowly qualify for 6th place and the playoffs. The head coach Dylan Falco explained in an interview at EarlyGame which changes in teamplay and tactics led them into the playoffs. In the playoffs, they defeated SK Gaming, but were themselves defeated by the MAD Lions. The team's surprising success attracted attention from other teams, and Odoamne left for Rogue, while Abbedagge left for 100 Thieves after the season concluded.

In 2021, Schalke 04 placed 4th in the LEC Spring Split. Despite their success in the Split, however, Schalke announced on June 29 that they would be selling their team slot and license in the LEC to the Swiss organization Team BDS for an estimated €26.5 million. The team has cited the COVID-19 pandemic and the parent club's relegation from Bundesliga as factors in the decision to leave the LEC. The 2021 Summer Split was their final appearance in the LEC; they finished last place in that split.

== Roster ==
Final Schalke 04 League of Legends roster
Players
Coaches

Role	Handle	Name	Nationality
Top	Broken Blade	Çelik, Sergen	Turkey
Jungle	Kirei	Yuen, Thomas	Netherlands
Mid	Nuclearint	Bizriken, Ilias	France
Bot	Neon	Jakubčík, Matúš	Slovakia
Support	LIMIT	Tot, Dino	Croatia
Jungle	Gilius	Demir, Erberk	Germany

Head coach

Dylan Falco

Assistant coach(es)

Rodrigo Domingues Oliveira
(head analyst)

Legend:
- (I) Inactive
- (S) Suspended
- Substitute
- (injured) Injury / Illness

Roster updated 19 May 2021.

== Tournament results ==
Placement	Event	Final result (W–T–L)
8th	2016 EU LCS Summer Split	3–9–6
Did not qualify	2017 EU LCS Spring Promotion	1–3 (against Misfits)
5th–8th	2016 GeForce Cup	0–2 (against TEAM #1)
1st	2017 EUCS Spring Split	5–0–0
3rd–4th	2017 EUCS Spring Playoffs	1–3 (against Misfits Academy)
2nd	2017 EUCS Summer Split	3–2–0
Qualified	2017 EUCS Summer Playoffs	3–1 (against Red Bulls)
Qualified	2018 EU LCS Spring Promotion	3–0 (against Ninjas in Pyjamas)
8th	2018 EU LCS Spring Split	7–11
3rd	2018 EU LCS Summer Split	12–6
2nd	2018 EU LCS Summer Playoffs	1–3 (against Fnatic)
2nd	2018 EU LCS Regional Qualifiers	1–3 (against G2 Esports)
7th	2019 LEC Spring Split	9–10
4th	2019 LEC Summer Split	11–7
3rd	2019 LEC Summer Playoffs	0–3 (against Fnatic)
3rd	2019 LEC Regional Finals	0–3 (against Splyce)
8th	2020 LEC Spring Split	6–12
6th	2020 LEC Summer Split	8–10
5th	2020 LEC Summer Playoffs	1–3 (against MAD Lions)
4th	2021 LEC Spring Split	9–9
4th	2021 LEC Spring Playoffs	1–3 (against Rogue)
10th	2021 LEC Summer Split	3–15
