= 2021 LEC season =

- League: LEC
- Sport: League of Legends
- Duration: January 22 - April 11 (Spring); June 22 - August 1 (Summer)
- Teams: 10

Spring
- Champions: MAD Lions
- Runners-up: Rogue
- Season MVP: Martin "Rekkles" Larsson (G2 Esports)

Summer
- Champions: MAD Lions
- Runners-up: Fnatic
- Season MVP: Kacper "Inspired" Słoma (Rogue)

LEC seasons
- ← 2020 2022 →

The 2021 LEC season was the third year of the League of Legends European Championship (LEC), a professional esports league for the MOBA PC game League of Legends, following its rebranding in late 2018. The spring regular season began on 22 January, and concluded on 14 March, while the playoffs started on 26 March and concluded on 11 April. The summer split began on 22 June, and playoffs concluded on 1 August. The three teams that qualified for the 2021 World Championship were MAD Lions, Fnatic, and Rogue, respectively.

== Teams ==
The Astralis Group merged its LEC team Origen into the Astralis brand prior to the 2021 season.

Astralis	Excel Esports
FC Schalke 04	Fnatic
G2 Esports	MAD Lions
Misfits Gaming	Rogue
SK Gaming	Team Vitality

== Spring ==
=== Regular season ===
Pos	Team	W	L	Pts	Qualification
1	G2 Esports (Note: G2 and Rogue's tie was broken by head-to-head record, with G2 winning both matchups.)	14	4	10	Advance to winners' bracket
2	Rogue	14	4	10	Advance to winners' bracket
3	MAD Lions	10	8	2	Advance to winners' bracket
4	FC Schalke 04 (Note: Because Fnatic and Schalke were tied in their head-to-head record, their tie was instead broken by their win percentage in the second round robin. Fnatic won three games in the second round robin while Schalke won four, so fourth place was awarded to Schalke.)	9	9	0	Advance to winners' bracket
5	Fnatic	9	9	0	Advance to losers' bracket
6	SK Gaming (Note: Misfits and SK Gaming's tie was broken by head-to-head record, with SK winning both matchups.)	8	10	−2	Advance to losers' bracket
7	Misfits Gaming	8	10	−2	
8	Excel Esports	7	11	−4	
9	Astralis	6	12	−6	
10	Team Vitality	5	13	−8	

Source: LoL Esports
Notes:

Upper round 1	Upper final	Final
1	G2 Esports	3
4	Schalke 04	2
1	G2 Esports	1
3	MAD Lions	3
2	Rogue	1
3	MAD Lions	3
3	MAD Lions	3
2	Rogue	2
Lower round 1	Lower round 2	Lower round 3	Lower final
1	G2 Esports	1
2	Rogue	3	2	Rogue	3
4	Schalke 04	3	4	Schalke 04	1
5	Fnatic	3	5	Fnatic	0
6	SK Gaming	1

=== Individual awards ===
Award	Player	Position	Team
All-Pro Team	Martin "Wunder" Hansen	Top	G2 Esports
All-Pro Team	Marcin "Jankos" Jankowski	Jungle	G2 Esports
All-Pro Team	Rasmus "Caps" Winther	Mid	G2 Esports
All-Pro Team	Martin "Rekkles" Larsson	Bot	G2 Esports
All-Pro Team	Mihael "Mikyx" Mehle	Support	G2 Esports
Coaching Staff of the Split	Rogue Coaching Staff	Staff	Rogue
Rookie of the Split	Javier "Elyoya" Prades Batalla	Jungle	MAD Lions
MVP	Martin "Rekkles" Larsson	Bot	G2 Esports

== Summer ==
=== Regular season ===
Pos	Team	W	L	Pts	Qualification
1	Rogue	13	5	8	Advance to winner' bracket
2	G2 Esports	12	6	6	Advance to winner' bracket
3	MAD Lions	12	6	6	Advance to winner' bracket
4	Misfits Gaming	12	6	6	Advance to winner' bracket
5	Fnatic	11	7	4	Advance to losers' bracket
6	Team Vitality	8	10	−2	Advance to losers' bracket
7	Excel Esports	7	11	−4	
8	Origen	7	11	−4	
9	SK Gaming	5	13	−8	
10	FC Schalke 04	3	15	−12	

Source: LoL Esports

=== Playoffs ===
Upper round 1	Upper final	Final
1	Rogue	3
4	Misfits Gaming	2
1	Rogue	0
2	MAD Lions	3
2	MAD Lions	3
3	G2 Esports	1
2	MAD Lions	3
5	Fnatic	1
Lower round 1	Lower round 2	Lower round 3	Lower final
1	Rogue	0
3	G2 Esports	2	5	Fnatic	3
4	Misfits Gaming	2	5	Fnatic	3
5	Fnatic	3	5	Fnatic	3
6	Team Vitality	2

=== Individual awards ===
Award	Player	Position	Team
All-Pro Team	Andrei "Odoamne" Pascu	Top	Rogue
All-Pro Team	Kacper "Inspired" Słoma	Jungle	Rogue
All-Pro Team	Rasmus "Caps" Winther	Mid	G2 Esports
All-Pro Team	Martin "Rekkles" Larsson	Bot	G2 Esports
All-Pro Team	Mihael "Mikyx" Mehle	Support	G2 Esports
Coaching Staff of the Split	Rogue Coaching Staff	Staff	Rogue
Rookie of the Split	Adam "Adam" Maanane	Top	Fnatic
MVP	Kacper "Inspired" Słoma	Jungle	Rogue
