= 2020 LEC season =

- League: LEC
- Sport: League of Legends
- Duration: January 24 - April 19 (Spring); June 12 - September 6 (Summer)
- Teams: 10

Spring
- Champions: G2 Esports
- Runners-up: Fnatic
- Season MVP: Marcin "Jankos" Jankowski (G2 Esports)

Summer
- Champions: G2 Esports
- Runners-up: Fnatic
- Season MVP: Rasmus "Caps" Winther (G2 Esports)

LEC seasons
- ← 2019 2021 →

The 2020 LEC season was the second year of the League of Legends European Championship (LEC), a professional esports league for the MOBA PC game League of Legends, following its rebranding in late 2018. The spring regular season began on 24 January and was originally scheduled to conclude on 21 March; however, due to the ongoing COVID-19 pandemic, the season was temporarily suspended on 13 March. Four days later, it was announced that all remaining LEC matches for the spring regular season would be played online, beginning on 20 March.

== League changes ==
On 23 April 2020, it was announced that the LEC would be given four spots at the 2020 World Championship due to the region's performance in 2018 and 2019. Unlike previous years, all of the LEC's participants at the 2020 World Championship will qualify solely through summer playoffs. Additionally, championship points awarded in the spring and summer regular seasons will no longer determine the LEC's second seed at the World Championship, nor seeding for the regional finals, which has been discontinued. Instead, they will only determine seeding for the summer playoffs. In the event of a tie in championship points, the team which earned more from the summer regular season will be awarded the higher seed.

Tiebreaker matches have also been discontinued; ties are broken either by head-to-head record or win percentage in the second round robin, with the former being considered before the latter.

== Broadcasting ==
The English broadcast is available on the LoL Esports website, as well as on Twitch and YouTube. On 20 January, Riot Games announced their official partnership with Chinese streaming service Huya, giving them exclusive rights to the Chinese broadcast.

== Teams ==
Excel Esports	FC Schalke 04
Fnatic	G2 Esports
MAD Lions	Misfits Gaming
Origen	Rogue
SK Gaming	Team Vitality

== Spring ==
=== Regular season ===
Pos	Team	W	L	Pts	Qualification
1	G2 Esports	15	3	12	Start in winners' bracket
2	Fnatic (Note: Because Fnatic and Origen were tied in their head-to-head record, their tie was instead broken by their win percentage in the second round robin. Fnatic won seven games in the second round robin while Origen won six, and so second place was awarded to Fnatic.)	13	5	8	Start in winners' bracket
3	Origen	13	5	8	Start in winners' bracket
4	MAD Lions	11	7	4	Start in winners' bracket
5	Misfits Gaming	10	8	2	Start in losers' bracket
6	Rogue	9	9	0	Start in losers' bracket
7	Excel Esports	7	11	−4	
8	FC Schalke 04	6	12	−6	
9	SK Gaming	4	14	−10	
10	Team Vitality	2	16	−14	

=== Playoffs ===
Upper round 1	Upper final	Final
1	G2 Esports	2
4	MAD Lions	3
4	MAD Lions	0
2	Fnatic	3
2	Fnatic	3
3	Origen	1
2	Fnatic	0
1	G2 Esports	3
Lower round 1	Lower round 2	Lower round 3	Lower final
4	MAD Lions	1
1	G2 Esports	3	1	G2 Esports	3
3	Origen	3	3	Origen	1
5	Misfits	1	6	Rogue	1
6	Rogue	3

=== Individual awards ===
Award	Player	Position	Team
All-Pro Team	Barney "Alphari" Morris	Top	Origen
All-Pro Team	Marcin "Jankos" Jankowski	Jungle	G2 Esports
All-Pro Team	Luka "Perkz" Perkovic	Mid	G2 Esports
All-Pro Team	Martin "Rekkles" Larsson	Bot	Fnatic
All-Pro Team	Mihael "Mikyx" Mehle	Support	G2 Esports
Coach of the Split	James "Mac" MacCormack	Coach	MAD Lions
Rookie of the Split	Ivan "Razork" Martin Diaz	Jungle	Misfits Gaming
MVP	Marcin "Jankos" Jankowski	Jungle	G2 Esports

== Summer ==
=== Regular season ===
Pos	Team	W	L	Pts	Qualification
1	Rogue	13	5	8	Qualify for winners' bracket
2	MAD Lions	12	6	6	Qualify for winners' bracket
3	G2 Esports	11	7	4	Qualify for winners' bracket
4	Fnatic (Note: Fnatic and SK Gaming's tie was broken by Fnatic winning both head-to-head matchups.)	9	9	0	Qualify for winners' bracket
5	SK Gaming	9	9	0	Qualify for losers' bracket
6	FC Schalke 04 (Note: Because Schalke and Excel were tied in their head-to-head record, their tie was instead broken by their win percentage in the second round robin. Schalke won seven games in the second round robin while Excel won four, and so sixth place was awarded to Schalke.)	8	10	−2	Qualify for losers' bracket
7	Excel Esports	8	10	−2	
8	Misfits Gaming	7	11	−4	
9	Team Vitality	7	11	−4	
10	Origen	6	12	−6	

Source: LoL Esports

=== Playoffs ===
Upper round 1	Upper final	Final
1	Rogue	0
4	Fnatic	3
4	Fnatic	3
2	G2 Esports	2
2	G2 Esports	3
3	MAD Lions	1
4	Fnatic	0
2	G2 Esports	3
Lower round 1	Lower round 2	Lower round 3	Lower final
2	G2 Esports	3
1	Rogue	3	1	Rogue	2
3	MAD Lions	3	3	MAD Lions	0
5	SK Gaming	0	6	FC Schalke 04	1
6	FC Schalke 04	3

=== Individual awards ===
Award	Player	Position	Team
All-Pro Team	Barney "Alphari" Morris	Top	Origen
All-Pro Team	Zhiqiang "Shad0w" Zhao	Jungle	MAD Lions
All-Pro Team	Rasmus "Caps" Winther	Mid	G2 Esports
All-Pro Team	Patrik "Patrik" Jírů	Bot	Excel
All-Pro Team	Norman "Kaiser" Kaiser	Support	MAD Lions
Coach of the Split	James "Mac" MacCormack	Coach	MAD Lions
Rookie of the Split	Labros "Labrov" Papoutsakis	Support	Team Vitality
MVP	Rasmus "Caps" Winther	Mid	G2 Esports
