= 2018 EU LCS season =

- League: EU LCS
- Sport: League of Legends
- Teams: 10
- TV partner(s): Twitch, Azubu, YouTube

Spring
- Season champions: Fnatic
- Runners-up: G2 Esports
- Season MVP: Martin "Rekkles" Larsson (Fnatic)

Summer
- Season champions: Fnatic
- Runners-up: FC Schalke 04 Esports
- Season MVP: Rasmus "Caps" Winther (Fnatic)

EU LCS seasons
- ← 2017 2019 →

The 2018 European League of Legends Championship Series (EU LCS) was the sixth season of the European League of Legends Championship Series, the highest level of professional League of Legends play in Europe. Most games were played at Studio K/L in Adlershof, Berlin, Germany. It was the final season under the EU LCS name, as the league was rebranded to the League of Legends EMEA Championship (LEC) from the 2019 season onwards.

== Format ==
Plans to break league into 4 regions and applying franchising business model was postponed until season 2019. Best-of-three format with dividing teams into two groups has been replaced by a Double Round Robin Format with "best of one" matches in a single group owing to EU LCS viewership falling.

Second-tier competition in Europe from season 2014 to 2017 was Challenger Series. In season 2018 it has been replaced by European Regional Leagues (ERLs). Promotion Tournament was cancelled, the European Cup provided in addition to ERLs.

== Spring ==
=== Regular season ===
Pos	Team	W - L	Points	Qualification
1.	Fnatic	14 - 4	+10	Advance to semifinals
2.	G2 Esports	11 - 7	+4	Advance to semifinals
3.	Splyce	11 - 7	+4	Advance to quarterfinals
4.	Team Vitality	10 - 8	+2	Advance to quarterfinals
5.	H2k-Gaming	8 - 10	-2	Advance to quarterfinals
6.	Team ROCCAT	8 - 10	-2	Advance to quarterfinals
7.	Misfits	8 - 10	-2	No qualification for Playoffs
8.	FC Schalke 04	7 - 11	-4	No qualification for Playoffs
9.	Giants Gaming	7 - 11	-4	No qualification for Playoffs
10.	Unicorns Of Love	6 - 12	-6	No qualification for Playoffs
