= 2020 League of Legends World Championship =

Tenth League of Legends World Championship, held in Shanghai

Tournament information
- Game: League of Legends
- Location: China
- Dates: 25 September–31 October
- Administrator: Riot Games
- Tournament formats: 10 team single round-robin play-in stage; 16 team double round-robin group stage; 8 team single-elimination bracket
- Venues: 2 (in Shanghai): Shanghai Media Tech Studio (play-ins, groups, quarterfinals, semifinals); Pudong Football Stadium (finals)
- Teams: 22

Final positions
- Champion: Damwon Gaming
- Runner-up: Suning

Tournament statistics
- Attendance: Peak viewership: 46,067,896
- MVP: Kim "Canyon" Geon-bu (Damwon Gaming)

The 2020 League of Legends World Championship was an esports tournament for the multiplayer online battle arena video game League of Legends. It was the tenth iteration of the League of Legends World Championship, an annual international tournament organized by the game's developer, Riot Games. It was held from 25 September to 31 October in Shanghai, China. Twenty-two teams from eleven regions qualified for the tournament based on their placement in regional circuits, such as those in China, Europe, North America, South Korea and Taiwan/Hong Kong/Macau/Southeast Asia, with ten of those teams having to reach the main "groups" event via a play-in stage.

"Take Over" was the tournament's theme song, put together by Henry Lau, Max Schneider, and A Day to Remember's lead vocalist Jeremy McKinnon.

The final was played on 31 October 2020 between Suning from China's League of Legends Pro League (LPL), and Damwon Gaming from South Korea's League of Legends Champions Korea (LCK). There, Damwon Gaming defeated Suning with a 3–1 scoreline, ending the LPL's back-to-back streak of world championship victories as they became the first South Korean team to win the world championship since Samsung Galaxy in 2017.

== Impact of the COVID-19 pandemic and other issues ==
The COVID-19 pandemic, which was mainly confined to China in January and early February 2020, affected the multi-city hosting format that was present previously. On 1 August, Riot Games announced the dates and location of the event, with all stages taking place in Shanghai through the use of an "isolation bubble" environment.

In September 2020, Riot Games announced that due to travel restrictions, two teams from VCS of Vietnam would not participate in the tournament.

During the 2020 Worlds Group Draw Show, it was revealed that PSG Talon's members "River" and "Tank" would be unable to attend the play-in stage due to delayed visas and quarantine issues, and that Hsiao "Kongyue" Jen-tso and Chen "Uniboy" Chang-chu would be loaned from ahq eSports Club to replace them. The organization confirmed this in an official announcement the next day, and further stated that "Unified" would also be unable to participate in the first half of the play-in stage for the same reason. Chen "Dee" Chun-dee was loaned from Machi Esports to replace Unified.

== Qualified teams ==
As the two Vietnamese teams (the Champion's Team Flash and Runner-up's GAM Esports of VCS Summer) are unable to participate, the third seed team from South Korea (LCK) will be promoted to start in the main group stage, as they were previously dropped to the play-in stage. The qualification format for North America and Europe changed with teams directly qualifying based on the results from their respective summer playoffs. Due to the merger of Taiwan/Hong Kong/Macau (LMS) and the Southeast Asian (LST) professional leagues into a single league (PCS) and have been reduced number of Worlds' spots from 4 to 2, Europe (LEC) will have another direct spot in the group stage and China (LPL) will have an additional spot in the play-in stage for the regional finals runner-up.

For the pool, the Main Group stage's pool #2 with 8 teams like as last year will be split to two pools #2 and pool #3, with 4 teams each pool. Qualified teams from Play-in stage will be drawn as pool #4. The Play-in stage's pool #3 in last year will be merged into pool #2, increased to 6 teams.

The teams that qualified for the event were:

| Region | League | Qualification Path | Team | ID | Pool |
Started from Group stage
| China | LPL | Summer Champion | Top Esports | TES | 1 |
| China | LPL | Most Championship Points | JD Gaming | JDG | 2 |
| China | LPL | Regional Finals Winner | Suning | SN | 2 |
| Europe | LEC | Summer Champion | G2 Esports | G2 | 1 |
| Europe | LEC | Summer Runner-Up | Fnatic | FNC | 2 |
| Europe | LEC | Summer 3rd Place | Rogue | RGE | 3 |
| South Korea | LCK | Summer Champion | Damwon Gaming | DWG | 1 |
| South Korea | LCK | Most Championship Points | DRX | DRX | 2 |
| South Korea | LCK | Regional Finals Winner | Gen.G | GEN | 3 |
| North America | LCS | Summer Champion | Team SoloMid | TSM | 1 |
| North America | LCS | Summer Runner-Up | FlyQuest | FLY | 3 |
| TW/HK/MO/SEA | PCS | Summer Champion | Machi Esports | MCX | 3 |
Started from Play-in stage
| China | LPL | Regional Finals Runner-Up | LGD Gaming | LGD | 1 |
| Europe | LEC | Summer 4th Place | MAD Lions | MAD | 1 |
| North America | LCS | Summer 3rd Place | Team Liquid | TL | 1 |
| TW/HK/MO/SEA | PCS | Summer Runner-Up | PSG Talon | PSG | 1 |
| CIS | LCL | Summer Champion | Unicorns of Love | UOL | 2 |
| Latin America | LLA | Summer Champion | Rainbow7 | R7 | 2 |
| Turkey | TCL | Summer Champion | SuperMassive Esports | SUP | 2 |
| Brazil | CBLOL | Summer Champion | INTZ | ITZ | 2 |
| Japan | LJL | Summer Champion | V3 Esports | V3 | 2 |
| Oceania | OPL | Summer Champion | Legacy Esports | LGC | 2 |

== Venues ==
After it was announced as early as November 2018 that the 2020 event would be held in China, Shanghai was the city chosen to host the competition. Almost all matches were played at Shanghai Media Tech Studio without spectators due to the COVID-19 pandemic, while the final match was held at Pudong Football Stadium.

Shanghai, China
| Play-in Stage | Group Stage | Quarterfinals | Semifinals | Finals |
| Shanghai Media Tech Studio | | | | Pudong Football Stadium |
| Capacity: 0 | | | | Capacity: 33,765 |
2020 League of Legends World Championship is located in China

== Play-in stage ==
- Venue: Shanghai Media Tech Studio.

=== Play-in groups ===
- Date and time: 25–28 September, began at 16:00 CST (UTC +08:00).
- Ten teams are drawn into two groups, with five teams in each group.
- Single round robin, all matches are best-of-one.
- If teams have same win–loss record at the end of play-ins, they play a tie-breaker match. A two-way tie is not broken by the results of the head-to-head game those teams played, however the team that won in the head-to-head gets side selection in the tiebreaker game.
- The top team automatically qualifies for the main event's group stage, while 2nd to 4th-place of each group advance to the play-in knockouts and 2nd-place receives a bye to Round 2. The bottom team is eliminated.

==== Group A ====
| Pos | Team | Pld | W | L | PCT | Qualification |
|---|---|---|---|---|---|---|
| 1 | Team Liquid | 5 | 4 | 1 | .800 | Advance to group stage |
| 2 | Legacy Esports | 5 | 3 | 2 | .600 | Advance to play-in knockouts round 1 |
| 3 | SuperMassive Esports | 4 | 2 | 2 | .500 | Advance to play-in knockouts round 2 |
| 4 | MAD Lions | 5 | 2 | 3 | .400 | Advance to play-in knockouts round 2 |
| 5 | INTZ | 5 | 1 | 4 | .200 | |

Source: LoL Esports
Rules for classification: 1) Winning percentage; 2) Tiebreaker match(es); 3) Total game victory time (Note: The total amount of time it took a team to win their games against all other teams in the tiebreaker)

==== Group B ====
| Pos | Team | Pld | W | L | PCT | Qualification |
|---|---|---|---|---|---|---|
| 1 | PSG Talon | 5 | 4 | 1 | .800 | Advance to group stage |
| 2 | Unicorns of Love | 5 | 3 | 2 | .600 | Advance to play-in knockouts round 1 |
| 3 | Rainbow7 | 4 | 2 | 2 | .500 | Advance to play-in knockouts round 2 |
| 4 | LGD Gaming | 5 | 2 | 3 | .400 | Advance to play-in knockouts round 2 |
| 5 | V3 Esports | 5 | 1 | 4 | .200 | |

Source: LoL Esports
Rules for classification: 1) Winning percentage; 2) Tiebreaker match(es); 3) Total game victory time

=== Play-in knockouts ===
- Date and time: 29–30 September
- King of the hill format with two branch. Single-elimination. All matches are best-of-five.
- The 3rd-place and 4th-place teams from the same group play each other in Round 1. Winner will play against with the 2nd-place team from other group in Round 2.
- The upper-place team chooses the side for all odd-numbered games, while the lower-place team chooses the side of even-numbered games.
- The winners of the Round 2 in each branch advances to the main event's group stage.

Round 1
B3 | Rainbow7 | 0
B4 | LGD Gaming | 3
A3 | SuperMassive Esports | 3
A4 | MAD Lions | 2

Round 2
A2 | Legacy Esports | 0
B4 | LGD Gaming | 3
B2 | Unicorns of Love | 3
A3 | SuperMassive Esports | 0

Source: LoL Esports

== Group stage ==
- Venue: Shanghai Media Tech Studio.
- Date and time: 3–11 October, began at 16:00 CST (UTC +08:00).
- Sixteen teams are drawn into four groups with four teams in each group based on their seeding. Teams of the same region cannot be placed in the same group.
- Double round robin, all matches are best-of-one.
- If teams have the same win–loss record and head-to-head record, a tiebreaker match is played for first or second place.
- Top two teams will advance to Playoff Stage. Bottom two teams are eliminated.

=== Group A ===
| Pos | Team | Pld | W | L | PCT | Qualification |
|---|---|---|---|---|---|---|
| 1 | Suning | 7 | 5 | 2 | .714 | Advance to knockouts |
| 2 | G2 Esports | 7 | 4 | 3 | .571 | Advance to knockouts |
| 3 | Team Liquid | 6 | 3 | 3 | .500 | |
| 4 | Machi Esports | 6 | 1 | 5 | .167 | |

Source: LoL Esports
Rules for classification: 1) Winning percentage; 2) Tiebreaker match(es); 3) Total game victory time

=== Group B ===
| Pos | Team | Pld | W | L | PCT | Qualification |
|---|---|---|---|---|---|---|
| 1 | Damwon Gaming | 6 | 5 | 1 | .833 | Advance to knockouts |
| 2 | JD Gaming | 6 | 4 | 2 | .667 | Advance to knockouts |
| 3 | PSG Talon | 6 | 2 | 4 | .333 | |
| 4 | Rogue | 6 | 1 | 5 | .167 | |

Source: LoL Esports
Rules for classification: 1) Winning percentage; 2) Tiebreaker match(es); 3) Total game victory time

=== Group C ===
| Pos | Team | Pld | W | L | PCT | Qualification |
|---|---|---|---|---|---|---|
| 1 | Gen.G | 6 | 5 | 1 | .833 | Advance to knockouts |
| 2 | Fnatic | 6 | 4 | 2 | .667 | Advance to knockouts |
| 3 | LGD Gaming | 6 | 3 | 3 | .500 | |
| 4 | Team SoloMid | 6 | 0 | 6 | .000 | |

Source: LoL Esports
Rules for classification: 1) Winning percentage; 2) Tiebreaker match(es); 3) Total game victory time

=== Group D ===
| Pos | Team | Pld | W | L | PCT | Qualification |
|---|---|---|---|---|---|---|
| 1 | Top Esports | 6 | 5 | 1 | .833 | Advance to knockouts |
| 2 | DRX | 6 | 4 | 2 | .667 | Advance to knockouts |
| 3 | FlyQuest | 6 | 3 | 3 | .500 | |
| 4 | Unicorns of Love | 6 | 0 | 6 | .000 | |

Source: LoL Esports
Rules for classification: 1) Winning percentage; 2) Tiebreaker match(es); 3) Total game victory time

== Playoff stage ==
- Date and time: 15–31 October, all matches will begin at 18:00 CST (UTC +08:00).
- Eight teams are drawn into a single elimination bracket.
- All matches are best-of-five.
- The 1st-place team of each group is drawn against the 2nd-place team of a different group.
- Teams from same group will be on opposite sides of the bracket, meaning they cannot play each other until the Finals.

Quarterfinals
15 October, 18:00 CST
D1 | Top Esports | 3
C2 | Fnatic | 2
16 October, 18:00 CST
A1 | Suning | 3
B2 | JD Gaming | 1
17 October, 18:00 CST
C1 | Gen.G | 0
A2 | G2 Esports | 3
18 October, 18:00 CST
B1 | Damwon Gaming | 3
D2 | DRX | 0

Semifinals
24 October, 18:00 CST
Top Esports | 1
Suning | 3
25 October, 18:00 CST
G2 Esports | 1
Damwon Gaming | 3

Final
31 October, 18:00 CST
Suning | 1
Damwon Gaming | 3

Source: LoL Esports

== Ranking ==
=== Team ranking ===
- (*) Not include tie-break games.
- The Vietnamese teams from VCS Summer who are unable to attend will be earned a 2.1% of prize pool, with 1.5% of Main Group Stage seed for the Champion (Team Flash) and 0.6% of Play-in Groups seed for the Runner-up (GAM Esports).

| Place | Region | Team | PG | PK1 | PK2 | GS | QF | SF | Finals | Prize (%) | Prize (USD) |
|---|---|---|---|---|---|---|---|---|---|---|---|
| 1st | LCK | Damwon Gaming | – | – | – | 5–1 | 3–0 | 3–1 | 3–1 | 25% | $556,250 |
| 2nd | LPL | Suning* | – | – | – | 4–2 | 3–1 | 3–1 | 1–3 | 17.5% | $389,375 |
| 3rd–4th | LEC | G2 Esports* | – | – | – | 4–2 | 3–0 | 1–3 | | 9% | $200,250 |
| 3rd–4th | LPL | Top Esports | – | – | – | 5–1 | 3–2 | 1–3 | | 9% | $200,250 |
| 5th–8th | LEC | Fnatic | – | – | – | 4–2 | 2–3 | | | 4.5% | $100,125 |
| 5th–8th | LCK | Gen.G | – | – | – | 5–1 | 0–3 | | | 4.5% | $100,125 |
| 5th–8th | LPL | JD Gaming | – | – | – | 4–2 | 1–3 | | | 4.5% | $100,125 |
| 5th–8th | LCK | DRX | – | – | – | 4–2 | 0–3 | | | 4.5% | $100,125 |
| 9th–11th | LCS | Team Liquid* | 3–1 | – | – | 3–3 | | | | 2.5% | $55,625 |
| 9th–11th | LPL | LGD Gaming* | 1–3 | 3–0 | 3–0 | 3–3 | | | | 2.5% | $55,625 |
| 9th–11th | LCS | FlyQuest | – | – | – | 3–3 | | | | 2.5% | $55,625 |
| 12th | PCS | PSG Talon* | 3–1 | – | – | 2–4 | | | | 2.5% | $55,625 |
| 13th–14th | LEC | Rogue | – | – | – | 1–5 | | | | 1.5% | $33,375 |
| 13th–14th | PCS | Machi Esports | – | – | – | 1–5 | | | | 1.5% | $33,375 |
| 15th–16th | LCS | Team SoloMid | – | – | – | 0–6 | | | | 1.5% | $33,375 |
| 15th–16th | LCL | Unicorns of Love* | 3–1 | – | 3–0 | 0–6 | | | | 1.5% | $33,375 |
| 17th | OPL | Legacy Esports* | 3–1 | – | 0–3 | | | | | 1% | $22,250 |
| 18th | TCL | SuperMassive Esports | 2–2 | 3–2 | 0–3 | | | | | 1% | $22,250 |
| 19th | LEC | MAD Lions* | 1–3 | 2–3 | | | | | | 0.75% | $16,687.50 |
| 20th | LLA | Rainbow7 | 2–2 | 0–3 | | | | | | 0.75% | $16,687.50 |
| 21st–22nd | CBLOL | INTZ* | 1–3 | | | | | | | 0.6% | $13,350 |
| 21st–22nd | LJL | V3 Esports* | 1–3 | | | | | | | 0.6% | $13,350 |
| Place | Region | Team | PG | PK1 | PK2 | GS | QF | SF | Finals | Prize (%) | Prize (USD) |
