= League of Legends Challenger Series =

Two professional League of Legends leagues

- Game: League of Legends
- Founded: 2014
- Folded: 2017
- Replaced by: European Masters (Europe); LCS Academy (North America)
- Owner: Riot Games
- No. of teams: 10 in Europe; 10 in North America
- Continents: Europe, North America
- Promotion to: League of Legends Championship Series

The League of Legends Challenger Series (CS) were two professional League of Legends leagues, one in Europe (EU CS) and one in North America (NA CS), that were the second highest level of professional League of Legends in those regions. The two highest-placing teams from the Challenger Series played in the League of Legends Promotion Tournament against the two lowest-placing League of Legends Championship Series (LCS) teams, the winners of which were promoted to the Championship Series in each region, whereas the losers were relegated to the Challenger Series. The league was announced in December 2013 and began play for the Spring 2014 season. Both the NA and EU CS were discontinued in 2018 in preparation for league franchising.
