= Elyoya =

Spanish professional League of Legends player

- Elyoya in 2026

Personal information
- Name: Javier Prades Batalla
- Born: March 13, 2000 (age 26); Villarreal, Spain

Current team
- Team: Movistar KOI
- Role: Jungler
- Game: League of Legends
- League: LEC

Career information
- Playing career: 2018–present

Team history
- 2018–2019: iNAT Gaming
- 2019: GGaming
- 2019: Movistar Riders Academy
- 2020: Movistar Riders
- 2021–2023: MAD Lions
- 2024: MAD Lions KOI
- 2025–present: Movistar KOI

Career highlights and awards
- 4× LEC champion; LEC Finals MVP; 3× LEC 1st All-Pro Team; Superliga champion; Superliga Finals MVP; Superliga MVP

Javier Prades Batalla (born 13 March 2000), better known as Elyoya, is a Spanish professional League of Legends player for Movistar KOI.

He has won four LEC titles, the most of any player that has not played for G2 Esports or Fnatic. He was named Finals MVP once (Spring 2025) and earned First Team All-Pro honors three times. He won a Superliga title in Summer 2020, being named both Finals and Season MVP.

== Professional career ==
=== 2020 season ===
After spending two months at the Movistar Riders Academy, Elyoya was promoted to the first team in October 2019, making his debut in the Iberian Cup at the end of the month.

He made his debut in Superliga Orange on January 23, 2020 against G2 Arctic. The team placed third in the spring split qualifying for the playoffs. In the playoffs, after comfortably beating Team Queso and MAD Lions Madrid in the quarterfinals and semifinals, respectively, lost to Vodafone Giants in the final 2–3. Despite the defeat, Elyoya managed to take the Rookie of the Split.

For the summer split the team was in first place, losing only 4 games. Elyoya's performance earned him seven MVP's of the game, the one with the most in the split. In the playoffs Riders beat Cream Real Betis 3–0 in the semifinal and another 3–0 against G2 Arctic in the final. Elyoya won the MVP of the split with 70% of the votes.

=== 2021 season ===
Elyoya sign with MAD Lions on November 24, 2020, for competing 2021 LEC season. MAD Lions won the spring and summer splits, with Elyoya winning the Rookie of the Split of spring split.

At the 2021 Mid-Season Invitational reached the semifinals but lost to DWG KIA 2–3. In 2021 World Championship they reached the quarterfinals, losing again to DWG KIA.

=== 2022 season ===
In the 2022 LEC season, Elyoya had less success. In the spring split, MAD failed to qualify for the playoffs. In summer, they ended second place with a 12–6 record, equaling G2. During playoffs, they lost to Rogue 2–3 in the upper round and 1–3 to Fnatic in the lower round. Despite this, MAD Lions managed to have four of its players named to the 1st All-Pro Team.

Internationally, despite not qualifying for the 2022 Mid-Season Invitational, they entered the 2022 World Championship as fourth seed. They managed to enter the knockout play-in where they beat Saigon Buffalo 3–1. However, they fell 0–3 against Evil Geniuses in their attempt to reach the group stage.

=== 2023 season ===
For the 2023 LEC season had a renewed team in top and bot lane. Reached the final of the winter split, losing 0–3 against G2 Esports. His performance earned him a spot on the best team in the split.

In spring, despite finishing 8th with a 3–6, he ended up winning the split against Team BDS 3–2. As in the previous split, Elyoya once again occupied the position on the 1st All-Pro Team, this time along with three of his teammates.

During 2023 Mid-Season Invitational they suffered the second fastest defeat in international an MSI (the fastest was T1 against Invictus Gaming in MSI 2019 with a time of 15:57), losing to T1 on the third map in a time of 16:47. Elyoya was the only one on his team who did not finish the series with a negative KDA, playing three Lee Sin's with 13/13/9.

The summer split they qualified for the groups but were quickly eliminated.

For the season finals they qualified in second position but losing to Fnatic 2–3 to qualify for the final, finally finishing in 3rd place and earning a pass to 2023 World Championship. In Worlds the team only achieved one victory against Team BDS, being eliminated against Weibo Gaming.

=== 2024 season ===
For the 2024 LEC season MAD Lions and KOI merged to form MAD Lions KOI. The new team made up of four rookies with Elyoya as captain, reached the final of the winter split. Despite winning the first map, the team ended up losing 1–3.

In the spring split the team had ups and downs, and were eliminated by Team Vitality in the playoffs, thus losing their chance to qualify for the 2024 Mid-Season Invitational.

On summer split the team qualified for the playoffs on the last day after winning their last game and two tiebreakers. In playoffs, they lost 1–2 in first round against Team BDS after dominating the series. They were eventually eliminated by Karmine Corp after a disappointing series.

For the season finals they lost to G2 Esports 1–3 in their pass to the final, finishing in third position and qualifying for 2024 World Championship. Despite winning their two games in the play-in, they ended up being eliminated in the Swiss stage after losing their three games.

=== 2025 season ===
For the 2025 LEC season the team acquired a new midlaner: Joseph "Jojopyun" Joon-pyun, the first NA import to play in the EU.

In winter split the team qualify for playoffs with a 6–3 record. In playoffs, after a few up and down matches, they finally ended up losing to Fnatic on their way to the final, finishing in fourth position and thus losing the opportunity to qualify for the 2025 First Stand.

The spring split the team qualify for playoffs in the third position with another 6–3. In playoffs, they defeated the current champion Karmine Corp twice, the last time being to advance to the split final against G2 Esports and qualifying for the 2025 Mid-Season Invitational and the 2025 Esports World Cup. In the final, the team looked superior throughout and won 3–1. After the final, Elyoya was named Finals MVP.

At MSI they were quickly eliminated after falling to Bilibili Gaming and CTBC Flying Oyster. In the EWC, the team qualified for the playoffs by defeating GAM Esports and their recent MSI executioner, CTBC Flying Oyster. In playoffs the team was eliminated by reigning world champion T1 1–2.

On summer split the team qualify for playoffs in first position in Group 1. In playoffs, after their victory against Fnatic, the team qualified for the 2025 World Championship. Additionally, Elyoya became the one on the only EMEA five players (alongside Marek "Humanoid" Brázda, Zdravets "Hylissang" Galabov, Luka "Perkz" Perković, and Bora "YellOwStaR" Kim) to qualify for Worlds in five consecutive years. After comfortably defeating Fnatic again in the lower bracket final, the team made it back to the split final against G2 Esports. In the final, the team was outclassed in every game and lost 0–3.

At Worlds, they started with losses against KT Rolster and G2 Esports. The team recovered by defeating Fnatic and Team Secret Whales. They then faced the reigning world champions, T1, for a spot in the quarterfinals, but lost 0–2, finishing in 9th–11th place.

=== 2026 season ===
At the first split of the season, the LEC Versus, the team suffered ups and downs in the regular season but qualified for the playoffs in 6th place with a 6–5 record. In the playoffs, the team comfortably beat Team Vitality (2–0) and Natus Vincere (2–0), securing passage to the Versus Finals at the Olimpic Arena in Badalona, the first of three events hosted by the team. At the event, the team lost 2–3 to Karmine Corp for a place in the final, finishing in 3rd place and failing to qualify for the 2026 First Stand.

In the spring, the team qualified for the playoffs in 4th place with a 6–3 record. On May 22, it was announced that Elyoya had renewed his contract with the team until 2028. Two days later, in their first playoff match, they swept Team Vitality 3–0 and faced G2 Esports for a spot in the final and 2026 Mid-Season Invitational, losing 2–3 after suffering a reverse sweep. They then faced Karmine Corp for a chance to qualify for both but lost in a disappointing series but qualifying for the 2026 Esports World Cup. At the EWC, the team lost to Bilibili Gaming and GAM Esports, finishing in 13th–16th place.

== Seasons overview ==
Year	Team	Domestic						International		
Year	Team	League	Split					First Stand	Mid-Season Invitational	World Championship
Year	Team	League	Versus	Winter	Spring	Summer	Season Finals	First Stand	Mid-Season Invitational	World Championship
2020	Movistar Riders	Superliga	—N/a	—N/a	2nd	1st	—N/a	—N/a	—	
2021	MAD Lions	LEC	—N/a	—N/a	1st	1st	—N/a	—N/a	3rd–4th	5th–8th
2022	MAD Lions	LEC	—N/a	—N/a	7th	4th	—N/a	—N/a	Did not qualify	17th–18th
2023	MAD Lions	LEC	—N/a	2nd	1st	7th	3rd	—N/a	7th–8th	12th–14th
2024	MAD Lions KOI	LEC	—N/a	2nd	6th	8th	3rd	—N/a	Did not qualify	15th–16th
2025	Movistar KOI	LEC	—N/a	4th	1st	2nd	—N/a	Did not qualify	7th–8th	9th–11th
2026	Movistar KOI	LEC	3rd	—N/a	3rd	2nd	—N/a	Did not qualify	Did not qualify	9th–11th

== Awards and honors ==
LEC

- Four-time LEC champion – Spring 2021, Summer 2021, Spring 2023, Spring 2025
- One-time LEC Finals MVP – Spring 2025
- Three-time LEC 1st All-Pro Team – Summer 2022, Winter 2023, Spring 2023
- Three-time LEC 3rd All-Pro Team – Spring 2021, Spring 2022, Spring 2025
- Rookie of the Split – Spring 2021

Superliga

- One-time Superliga champion – Summer 2020
- One-time Superliga Finals MVP – Summer 2020
- One-time Superliga MVP – Summer 2020
- Rookie of the Split – Spring 2020

Tournaments

- La Bruma Grand Prix – 2019
- Madrid Open Cup – 2019
