= 2025 LEC season =

- League: LEC
- Sport: League of Legends
- Duration: 18 January – 2 March (Winter); 29 March – 8 June (Spring); 2 August – 28 September (Summer)
- Teams: 10

Winter
- Champions: Karmine Corp
- Runners-up: G2 Esports
- Season MVP: Vladimiros "Vladi" Kourtidis (Karmine Corp)

Spring
- Champions: Movistar KOI
- Runners-up: G2 Esports
- Season MVP: Javier "Elyoya" Prades (Movistar KOI)

Summer
- Champions: G2 Esports
- Runners-up: Movistar KOI
- Season MVP: Rudy "SkewMond" Semaan (G2 Esports)

LEC seasons
- ← 2024 2026 →

The 2025 LEC season was the 13th season of the League of Legends EMEA Championship (LEC), a professional esports league for the video game League of Legends. It is the first LEC season under the new three-split structure and competitive calendar introduced the game's developer Riot Games starting with the 2025 competitive season. As with previous years, the 2025 season was divided into three splits, Winter, Spring, and Summer — retaining its current split structure while removing Season Finals after two seasons. The season began on 18 January and ended on 28 September.

Karmine Corp won its maiden LEC title during the winter split after defeating G2 Esports in a 3–0 sweep, qualifying for the 2025 First Stand Tournament to make its first appearance at an international League of Legends competition. The following split, Movistar KOI also defeated G2 Esports with a score of 3–1, with both teams representing the LEC at the 2025 Mid-Season Invitational. Both teams, who qualified for the 2025 League of Legends World Championship as the top two seeds, also contested the Summer Split title, which was won by G2 Esports in a 3–0 sweep against Movistar KOI. Fnatic also qualified for the 2025 World Championship as the third seed.

== League changes ==
As the LEC already had a three-split structure prior to Riot Games' announcement of a new split structure and competitive calendar for League of Legends esports beginning with the 2025 competitive season, the LEC only made minimal changes to its structure but made each split's format different. In addition, from 2025 onwards, the Season Finals would not be held and championship points would not determine a qualifier to the League of Legends World Championship.

=== Teams ===
One team change occurred heading into the 2025 season. Following a triple merger between KOI, Movistar Riders, and MAD Lions on 4 January 2024, MAD Lions KOI would be renamed to "Movistar KOI." The name change took effect at the beginning of the 2025 LEC season.

On 13 June 2025, it was announced that Ukrainian esports organization Natus Vincere (NAVI) had acquired Rogue's slot in the LEC. The team will make its league debut during the Summer Split.

=== Patches ===
The LEC is playing on the live patch for the first time in its history, making the second domestic region to adapt it after the League Championship Series (LCS), which was initially replaced by the League of Legends Championship of The Americas (LTA) in 2025 before the revert back to LCS.

=== Fearless Draft ===
As part of the initial changes to the 2025 competitive calendar, the Winter Split implemented the "Fearless Draft" format into the LEC. The format, which was popularized by China's LoL Development League, meant that teams could not pick a champion that they've already played in a series, even if the champion was picked by the opposing team. On 16 March 2025, prior to the final of the 2025 First Stand Tournament (which featured LEC team Karmine Corp), Riot Games announced that Fearless Draft would continue to be used for the rest of the 2025 season, including the LEC's Spring and Summer Splits and international tournaments.

== Winter ==
The Winter Split regular season began on 18 January and lasted until the Winter Split Finals on 2 March.

=== Format ===
Across three (3) weeks, all ten (10) competed in a single-round robin tournament where all matches were played in best-of-ones. The top eight (8) teams qualified to the playoffs, where an eight-team Double-elimination tournament bracket format was applied. Matches in the first two upper and lower rounds were contested in best-of-threes, while subsequent matches until the finals were played in best-of-fives. The winner of the Winter Split represented the LEC as its lone representative at the 2025 First Stand Tournament.

=== Regular season ===
Pos	Team	Pld	W	L	PCT	Qualification
1	Fnatic	9	8	1	.889	Advance to playoffs
2	Karmine Corp	9	6	3	.667	Advance to playoffs
3	G2 Esports	9	6	3	.667	Advance to playoffs
4	Movistar KOI	9	6	3	.667	Advance to playoffs
5	Team Vitality	9	5	4	.556	Advance to playoffs
6	GIANTX	9	5	4	.556	Advance to playoffs
7	Team BDS	9	4	5	.444	Advance to playoffs
8	Team Heretics	9	3	6	.333	Advance to playoffs
9	SK Gaming	9	1	8	.111	
10	Rogue	9	1	8	.111	

Updated to match(es) played on 27 January 2025. Source: LoL Esports

=== Playoffs ===
Upper quarterfinals	Upper semifinals	Upper final	Final
15 February
1	Fnatic	2
17 February
8	Team Heretics	0
1	Fnatic	0
15 February
3	G2 Esports	2
3	G2 Esports	2
24 February
6	GIANTX	0
3	G2 Esports	3
16 February
2	Karmine Corp	1
4	Movistar KOI	2
17 February
7	Team BDS	0
4	Movistar KOI	0
16 February
2	Karmine Corp	2
2	Karmine Corp	2	2 March
5	Team Vitality	0	3	G2 Esports	0
2	Karmine Corp	3
Lower round 1	Lower quarterfinals	Lower semifinals	Lower final
23 February
22 February	1	Fnatic	2	1 March
5	Team Vitality	1	7	Team BDS	1	28 February	2	Karmine Corp	3
7	Team BDS	2	1	Fnatic	3	1	Fnatic	2
23 February	4	Movistar KOI	1
22 February	4	Movistar KOI	2
6	GIANTX	2	6	GIANTX	0
8	Team Heretics	1

Source: LoL Esports

=== Awards ===
Award	Player	Team
Finals MVP	Vladi	Karmine Corp

== Spring ==
=== Format ===
The Spring Split featured the same ten (10) competing teams from the previous split. It was a single-round robin tournament where all matches were played in best-of-threes. Unlike the previous season, only the top six (6) teams advanced to the playoffs. The playoffs were contested in a Double-elimination tournament bracket, where the top (4) teams in the standings being seeded in the upper round and the next two (2) teams in the lower round. All matches were played in best-of-fives. The finalists of the Spring Split qualified for the 2025 Mid-Season Invitational.

=== LEC Roadtrip ===
On 7 March 2025, the LEC announced the creation of the "LEC Roadtrip," where regular season matches will be held outside of the Riot Games Arena in Berlin. For the 2025 Spring Split, Movistar KOI will host four matches from 26-27 April at the Madrid Arena in Madrid, Spain; while Karmine Corp will also host four matches from 10-11 May at the Les Arènes in Paris, France.

=== Regular season ===
Pos	Team	Pld	W	L	PCT	Qualification
1	Karmine Corp	9	8	1	.889	Playoffs Upper Bracket
2	Fnatic	9	7	2	.778	Playoffs Upper Bracket
3	Movistar KOI	9	6	3	.667	Playoffs Upper Bracket
4	G2 Esports	9	5	4	.556	Playoffs Upper Bracket
5	GIANTX	9	4	5	.444	Playoffs Lower Bracket
6	Team Heretics	9	4	5	.444	Playoffs Lower Bracket
7	Team Vitality	9	4	5	.444	
8	Team BDS	9	3	6	.333	
9	SK Gaming	9	2	7	.222	
10	Rogue	9	2	7	.222	

Updated to match(es) played on 5 May 2025. Source: LoL Esports

==== Tiebreaker ====
Due to the same game record of Team Heretics and Team Vitality, a tiebreaker best-of-one match was played on 14 May between the two teams to determine the sixth seed in the playoffs, which Team Heretics won.

=== Playoffs ===
Upper semifinals	Upper final	Final
25 May
1	Karmine Corp	2
26 May
3	Movistar KOI	3
3	Movistar KOI	1
24 May
4	G2 Esports	3
2	Fnatic	1
4	G2 Esports	3	8 June
4	G2 Esports	1
Lower quarterfinals	Lower semifinals	Lower final	3	Movistar KOI	3
31 May
7 June
2	Fnatic	3
2 June	3	Movistar KOI	3
5	GIANTX	1
2	Fnatic	0	1	Karmine Corp	2
1 June
1	Karmine Corp	3
1	Karmine Corp	3
6	Team Heretics	1

Source: LoL Esports

=== Awards ===
Award	Player	Team
Finals MVP	Elyoya	Movistar KOI
Season MVP	Upset	Fnatic
1st All-Pro Team
1st All-Pro Team	Canna	Karmine Corp
1st All-Pro Team	Yike	Karmine Corp
1st All-Pro Team	Vladi	Karmine Corp
1st All-Pro Team	Upset	Fnatic
1st All-Pro Team	Mikyx	Fnatic
2nd All-Pro Team
2nd All-Pro Team	Myrwn	Movistar KOI
2nd All-Pro Team	Razork	Fnatic
2nd All-Pro Team	Jojopyun	Movistar KOI
2nd All-Pro Team	Caliste	Karmine Corp
2nd All-Pro Team	Alvaro	Movistar KOI
3rd All-Pro Team
3rd All-Pro Team	Naak Nako	Team Vitality
3rd All-Pro Team	Elyoya	Movistar KOI
3rd All-Pro Team	Caps	G2 Esports
3rd All-Pro Team	Hans Sama	G2 Esports
3rd All-Pro Team	Targamas	Karmine Corp

== Summer ==
=== Format ===
All ten (10) competing teams were divided into two groups of five teams. Each team in their respective groups play other teams once in a best-of-three series match. The top two (2) teams from each group progressed to the playoffs, and the lowest-ranked teams in each group were eliminated. Third and fourth-ranked teams in each group played cross matches in best-of-fives to determine the final two playoff berths. Similar to the Spring Split, the playoffs will be a Double-elimination tournament bracket, where the top (4) teams in the standings being seeded in the upper round and the winners of the crossplay deciding matches in the lower round. All matches were played in best-of-fives, with the top three (3) teams in the playoffs securing qualification for the 2025 League of Legends World Championship.

The end of the Summer Split would also take place in a roadshow. On 27 April 2025, the LEC announced that the Summer Split Finals will be held at the Caja Mágica in Madrid, Spain from 26-28 September.

=== Regular season ===
Group 1

Pos	Team	Pld	W	L	PCT	Qualification
1	Movistar KOI	4	3	1	.750	Playoffs Upper Bracket
2	Karmine Corp	4	3	1	.750	Playoffs Upper Bracket
3	GIANTX	4	2	2	.500	Cross Play Decider
4	Team Vitality	4	2	2	.500	Cross Play Decider
5	Natus Vincere	4	0	4	.000	Eliminated

Updated to match(es) played on 26 August 2025. Source: LoL Esports

Group 2

Pos	Team	Pld	W	L	PCT	Qualification
1	G2 Esports	4	4	0	1.000	Playoffs Upper Bracket
2	Fnatic	4	3	1	.750	Playoffs Upper Bracket
3	Team Heretics	4	1	3	.250	Cross Play Decider
4	Team BDS	4	1	3	.250	Cross Play Decider
5	SK Gaming	4	1	3	.250	Eliminated

Updated to match(es) played on 26 August 2025. Source: LoL Esports

=== Cross Play Decider ===
Cross Play Decider 1
6 September
A3	GIANTX	3
B4	Team BDS	0

Cross Play Decider 2
5 September
B3	Team Heretics	1
A4	Team Vitality	3

=== Playoffs ===
Venues:

- Riot Games Arena, Berlin, Germany
- Caja Mágica, Madrid, Spain

Upper Bracket Round 1	Upper Bracket Final	Final
8 September – Berlin
A1	Movistar KOI	3
14 September – Berlin
B2	Fnatic	2
A1	Movistar KOI	1
7 September – Berlin
B1	G2 Esports	3
B1	G2 Esports	3
A2	Karmine Corp	1	28 September – Madrid
B1	G2 Esports	3
Lower Bracket Round 1	Lower Bracket Round 2	Lower Bracket Final	A1	Movistar KOI	0
15 September – Berlin
27 September – Madrid
B2	Fnatic	3
26 September – Madrid	A1	Movistar KOI	3
A3	GIANTX	0
B2	Fnatic	3	B2	Fnatic	1
13 September – Berlin
A2	Karmine Corp	1
A2	Karmine Corp	3
A4	Team Vitality	1

Source: LoL Esports

=== Awards ===
Award	Player	Team
Finals MVP	SkewMond	G2 Esports

== Awards ==
Award	Player	Team
Rookie of the Year	Caliste	Karmine Corp
