= 2026 Esports World Cup =

Esports tournament series held in France

Tournament information
- Sport: Esports
- Location: Paris, France
- Dates: 2 July–23 August
- Administrator: Esports Foundation; Tournaments supervised by ESL
- Venue(s): Paris Expo Porte de Versailles; Accor Arena
- Number of events: 25 in 24 esports
- Purse: $75 million
- Website: esportsworldcup.com

Final positions
- Champion: AG.AL (Note: For Club Championship purposes, All Gamers are known as "AG.AL Esports International" (or just AG.AL), as the organization includes All Gamers (based in China), All Gamers Global (for players outside of China), All Combo (the Mobile Legends: Bang Bang division of All Gamers based in Malaysia) and Anyone's Legend (most notably the League of Legends division of All Gamers).) (1st title)
- 1st runner-up: Team Falcons
- 2nd runner-up: Team Vitality

The 2026 Esports World Cup (EWC) was the third edition of the Esports World Cup, an annual international esports tournament series run by the Esports Foundation (EF). It took place in Paris, France from 2 July to 23 August 2026 and featured 25 events in 24 esports.

The event was scheduled to take place in Riyadh, Saudi Arabia, as it had for the prior two editions and both editions of Gamers8, EWC's predecessor. However, it was moved to Paris amid security concerns related to the 2026 Iran war.

This year featured one new title in the main lineup, the racing game Trackmania (2020), while Fortnite made its return to the EWC, this time using the Reload game mode. On the other hand, Rennsport and StarCraft II were not present this year. Due to their series' annual game releases, Call of Duty: Black Ops 7 and EA Sports FC 26 replaced Call of Duty: Black Ops 6 and EA Sports FC 25, respectively, in the game lineup.

Similar to the first two EWCs, each game hosted at least one event, some were standalone events while others were part of a larger competitive circuit. Mobile Legends: Bang Bang remained as the only game to host two events. A total of $75 million was distributed across all events, an increase from $71.5 million in 2025.

== Background ==
On 8 October 2025, the EWC announced the first 20 games that were included as part of the lineup. Out of the 24 games that were part of the main lineup in 2025, Rennsport, Rocket League, StarCraft II, and Tekken 8 weren't listed among the initial returning games. On 11 October, Tekken 8 was confirmed to return as the 21st game in the lineup.

On 17 December, the EWC announced that it entered a three-year partnership with Epic Games that would see two of its games, Fortnite and Rocket League, host EWC events through 2028. The latter was featured in both of the previous EWCs while the former returns to the lineup after it was featured in 2024. In the case of Fortnite, rather than the game being played on the game's Battle Royale mode (during Gamers8, the predecessor of the Esports World Cup) or in custom maps made using the Unreal Editor for Fortnite (as was the case for 2024), the event was played in Fortnite Reload, a variation of the Battle Royale mode, as part of the Fortnite Reload Elite Series. Trackmania (2020) was announced as the 24th and final game on 19 January 2026, which also marked the game's EWC debut.

The exclusion of StarCraft II from the lineup meant that the 2026 EWC would not feature any real-time strategy games, which caused criticism from creators and fans from the StarCraft II and RTS communities. Rennsport was the only other game dropped from the main lineup.

Saudi Crown Prince Mohammed bin Salman Al Saud and French President Emmanuel Macron at the closing ceremony of the EWC at the Grand Palais in Paris.

=== Move to Paris ===
On 14 May 2026, it was reported that the Esports Foundation had communicated to stakeholders surrounding EWC that the event would move from Riyadh, Saudi Arabia to Paris, France. The move was cited as a response to uncertainty in the Middle East region due to the 2026 Iran war, which has seen Iran and its allies attack Saudi infrastructure. The war had already caused the Saudi Arabian Grand Prix in Formula One to not take place as scheduled in April. The relocation was later confirmed by the Esports Foundation on 20 May, with the Paris Expo Porte de Versailles announced as the new host venue. On July 2026, it was announced that the Accor Arena would host the finals of the 2026 Esports World Cup Counter-Strike 2 tournament. Paris has hosted multiple major esports events, including the 2019 League of Legends World Championship Final, 2023's BLAST.tv Paris Major in Counter-Strike: Global Offensive and the 2025 Valorant Champions, among others.

== Format ==
=== Club Championship ===
The Club Championship was a cross-game competition within the Esports World Cup. The championship gave out a total of US$30 million among the top 24 clubs (used by the EWC in place of "organization"), determined by their overall performance in various games throughout the event. To qualify for the Club Championship, a club had to finish in the top 8 in at least two competitions, and to win the championship title, the club also had to secure first place in at least one competition. Only participants who were publicly announced as part of their respective organization before 1 May 2026 and registered as a representative before 26 May are eligible to earn points for their club. Below is a breakdown of the points awarded based on placement in the individual game championships:

Point distribution per event (Note: For events with no tiebreakers, 3–4 receive 500 points and/or 5–8 receive 200 points.)
Pos.	Points	Pos.	Points
1	1000	5	200
2	750	6	150
3	500	7	100
4	300	8	50

=== Club Partner Program ===
The Esports Foundation's Club Partner Program (formerly the Club Support Program) was an initiative designed to provide substantial financial assistance to selected esports organizations. Through this program, chosen teams receive annual financial support to enhance their operations and create more opportunities for professional players. The program was kept to cover 40 organizations, the same number as in 2025.

The 40 teams represented the five major competitive regions — Europe, North America, Asia, South America, and the Middle East — with the majority of the teams being primarily based in Europe or Asia. The initial list was revealed on 31 March 2026, accompanying the Esports World Cup Foundation's renaming to the Esports Foundation; it was leaked to Sheep Esports on 30 March. Several teams from the 2025 Club Partner Program, including LOUD, Bilibili Gaming, EVOS Esports and most notably FaZe Clan, did not get accepted, while 2024 Club Support Program member NRG returns after missing out in 2025. HEROIC was later removed from the program after the removal of their Dota 2 roster, leaving Counter-Strike 2 as the sole game they competed in. They agreed to void the slot by mutual decision. Karmine Corp, who had initially missed out on the program, would be announced as their replacement on 19 May.

Europe

- Fnatic
- FUT Esports
- G2 Esports
- Gentle Mates
- Karmine Corp (Note: Karmine Corp was initially not included in the Club Partner Program but were added later, replacing HEROIC.)
- MOUZ
- Natus Vincere
- Ninjas in Pyjamas (Note: For Club Championship purposes, Ninjas in Pyjamas are known as "Ninjas in Pyjamas eStar", as NIP Group also own Chinese organization eStar Pro.)
- Team Heretics
- Team Liquid (Note: Team qualified for the Club Partner Program as one of the top 8 clubs in the 2025 Club Championship.)
- Team Secret
- Team Spirit
- Team Vitality
- Virtus.pro

North America

- 100 Thieves
- Cloud9
- NRG
- Sentinels

Asia

- All Gamers
- Edward Gaming
- GAM Esports
- Gen.G Esports
- GodLike Esports
- JD Gaming
- ONIC Esports
- REJECT
- Rex Regum Qeon
- S8UL Esports
- T1
- Titan Esports Club
- Weibo Gaming
- Wolves Esports
- ZETA DIVISION

South America

- 9z
- Alpha7 Esports
- Fluxo W7M
- FURIA
- Leviatán

Middle East

- Team Falcons
- Twisted Minds

== Calendar ==
Most of the calendar was unveiled on 20 January 2026, with the exceptions of Fortnite Reload, PUBG Mobile, and Rocket League. Like last year, the events were held across a seven-week calendar.

●	Last chance qualifiers	●	Main competition days	●	Finals

July/August 2026		July																														August																						
July/August 2026		Kickoff				Week 1							Week 2							Week 3							Week 4							Week 5							Week 6							Week 7						
July/August 2026		2	3	4	5	6	7	8	9	10	11	12	13	14	15	16	17	18	19	20	21	22	23	24	25	26	27	28	29	30	31	1	2	3	4	5	6	7	8	9	10	11	12	13	14	15	16	17	18	19	20	21	22	23
Apex Legends							●	●	●	●	●																																											
Call of Duty: Black Ops 7																															●	●	●			●	●	●	●	●														
Call of Duty: Warzone																														●	●	●	●																					
Chess																																			●	●	●					●	●	●	●	●								
Counter-Strike 2																																						●	●	●										●	●	●	●	●
Crossfire																																																	●	●	●	●	●	
Dota 2							●	●	●	●	●	●		●	●	●	●	●	●																																			
EA Sports FC 26									●	●	●	●										●	●		●	●																												
Fatal Fury: City of the Wolves					●			●	●	●	●																																											
Fortnite Reload																																																		●	●	●	●	
Free Fire															●	●	●	●																																				
Honor of Kings																														●	●	●	●	●	●	●	●	●	●															
League of Legends															●	●	●	●	●																																			
Mobile Legends: Bang Bang	Men's																					●	●	●	●	●				●	●	●																						
Mobile Legends: Bang Bang	Women's													●	●	●	●	●																																				
Overwatch																													●	●	●	●	●																					
PUBG: Battlegrounds																					●	●	●	●	●	●																												
PUBG Mobile																																					●	●	●	●		●	●		●	●	●							
Rainbow Six Siege																																			●	●	●	●	●	●			●	●	●	●								
Rocket League																																							●	●	●		●	●	●	●	●							
Street Fighter 6																								●	●	●			●	●	●	●																						
Teamfight Tactics																					●	●	●	●	●																													
Tekken 8																															●	●	●			●	●	●	●															
Trackmania																																																		●	●	●	●	
Valorant		●	●	●	●	●	●		●	●	●	●																																										

== Results ==
=== Event winners ===
Event	Gold	Silver	Bronze
Apex Legends (Note: Known as the ALGS Year 6 Split 1 Playoffs, part of the Apex Legends Global Series.)	UNLIMIT; Yulariman xtsuvi Peace	Team Vision; Zach; LOTR31; Carter	Sentinels; Blinkzr; FunFPS; Monsoon
Call of Duty: Black Ops 7	OpTic Gaming; Dashy; Huke; Mercules; Shotzzy	Team Heretics; MettalZ; ReeaL; RenKoR; SupeR	100 Thieves aBeZy; HyDra; Nium; Scrap
Call of Duty: Warzone (Note: Takes the place of the Championship Finals for the Warzone Resurgence Series 2026.)	G2 Esports; Cythe; Bigman; Anziety	T1; Echo1867; Spam; Disrrpt	JD Gaming; FLS; Melvn; Slappy
Chess (Note: Takes the place of the Tour Finals for the Champions Chess Tour 2025–2026.)	Magnus Carlsen (Team Liquid)	Denis Lazavik (AG.AL) (Note: Due to the Esports World Cup requiring all divisions of a club to have unified branding for the Club Championship, the player represented All Gamers Global as AG.AL during the tournament, as they are part of the Chinese organization All Gamers.)	Hikaru Nakamura (Team Falcons)
Counter-Strike 2	Team Spirit magixx zont1x donk sh1ro tN1R	FUT Esports dem0n Krabeni cmtry dziugss xfl0ud	Legacy latto dumau n1ssim arT try
CrossFire (Note: Takes the place of the CrossFire Stars Summer Championship 2026.)	BaiSha Gaming; Lye; 577; N9; YDSS; Xxiao	Team Liquid adrF; WY; DANIMALz; Goken; 77	KINGZERO-eSports; 9u ice xn yf Tong
Dota 2 (Note: Formerly known as the Riyadh Masters during prior editions of Gamers8 (EWC's predecessor) and the Esports World Cup. The tournament takes the place of the Tour Finals for the ESL Pro Tour 2026.)	Team Vision; Satanic; No[o]ne- Noticed; 9Class; Dukalis	BB Team; Kiritych gpk MieRo; Save- Kataomi	Team Yandex watson CHIRA_JUNIOR; DM; Saksa; Malady
EA Sports FC 26 (Note: Known as the FC Pro World Championship 2026.)	RvPLegend (HYPERSPIRIT)	levyfinn (RBLZ Gaming)	Bonanno (Manchester City Esports)
Fatal Fury: City of the Wolves (Note: Tournament contains a qualification berth to the SNK World Championship Finals 2026.)	DarkAngel (Natus Vincere)	mi2ha4 (Virtus.pro)	Nemo (Saishunkan Sol Kumamoto)
Fortnite Reload (Note: Known as the Fortnite Reload Elite Series Championship, part of the Fortnite Reload Elite Series.)	Berlin International Gaming vic0 Malibuca	Momsy (Lyost Esport) (Note: Not eligible for Club Championship points.); SkyJump (Ravens Esports)	Aurora Gaming shxrk t3eny
Free Fire (Note: Tournament is part of the Free Fire World Series.)	LYON; Haax; Gamezking; SoyDella; Joker; Joacozd	AG.AL (Note: Due to the Esports World Cup requiring all divisions of a club to have unified branding for the Club Championship, All Gamers Global competed as AG.AL during the tournament, as they are part of the Chinese organization All Gamers.); NAMELESS; SAIFA; DEW; TEAMSR; BAROS	LOUD; HAK; Nickz7; Trap; GUAXA7 bzp10
Honor of Kings (Note: Known as the Honor of Kings World Cup 2026; featuring teams from the Arena of Valor professional leagues.)	KuaiShou Gaming silence JuHao; LiuLang; Yu; LFF	AG.AL (Note: Due to the Esports World Cup requiring all divisions of a club to have unified branding for the Club Championship, AG Super Play competed as AG.AL during the tournament, as they are part of the Chinese organization All Gamers.); Ran; Zoe; Sheng; YiNuo; Shuai	Geekay Esports; GuiYu; MusangKing; Shisan; Jem; Zhe
League of Legends (Note: This event is not sponsored, endorsed, or administered by Riot Games, but the tournament is officially sanctioned by the developers.)	Dplus KIA; Siwoo; Lucid; ShowMaker; Smash; Career	Karmine Corp; Canna; Yike kyeahoo Caliste; Busio	Gen.G; Kiin; Canyon; Chovy; Ruler; Duro
Mobile Legends: Bang Bang – Men (Note: Known as the MLBB Mid Season Cup 2026.)	Team Spirit; Kid Bomba zaur egoist Sunset Lover; Hiko; SAWO	Yangon Galacticos; Ying; Hannn; Kaize; Sanjiii; Blink	ONIC Esports; Lutpi; Kairi; SANZ; Kelra; Kiboy
Mobile Legends: Bang Bang – Women (Note: Known as the MLBB Women's International 2026.)	Team Vitality; Fumi; Vival; Cinny; Chell; Vivian	Natus Vincere; Ayanami; Keishi; Rain; Rianne; Meraaay	Geltek Cyber Team; Lyubon; Kioway; Sonjjqkke; Tokio; KUWEJO
Overwatch (Note: Known as the OWCS Midseason Championship 2026, part of the Overwatch Champions Series.)	ZETA DIVISION; Proper knife Bernar; Shu; Viol2t	Twisted Minds; Quartz; Youbi; TVNT; FunnyAstro; Simple	T1; Proud; ZEST; DONGHAK skewed Bliss
PUBG: Battlegrounds (Note: Tournament is part of the PUBG Global Championship.)	Virtus.pro; Lukarux; Beami curexi NIXZYEE	The Vicious; YmCud pau Taikonn; SirT	Natus Vincere; Feyerist; Hakatory boost1k- spyrro
PUBG Mobile (Note: Known as the PUBG Mobile World Cup 2026, part of the PUBG Mobile Global Championship.)	S2G Esports; Solkay; Lost; Kamikaze; HamsiG	Nongshim RedForce; SOEZ; XZY; TIZ1; HYUNBIN	Aurora Gaming; DOK; TOP; Zyol; REFUS
Rainbow Six Siege (Note: Tournament contains a qualification berth to the Six Invitational 2027.)	FaZe Clan; VITAKING soulz1 KDS; Handyy; Cyber	FURIA volpz Loira; HerdsZ; DiasLucasBr; Bokzera	DarkZero; Nuers njr Kyno; J9O; Fultz
Rocket League	Team Falcons; Rw9; Kiileerrz dralii	Spacestation Gaming zach diaz reveal	Ninjas in Pyjamas eStar (Note: Due to the Esports World Cup requiring all divisions of a club to have unified branding for the Club Championship, Ninjas in Pyjamas competed as Ninjas in Pyjamas eStar during the tournament.); Joreuz crr oaly
Street Fighter 6 (Note: Tournament is part of the Capcom Pro Tour.)	Craime (Team Falcons)	Hibiki (SBI e-Sports)	Hinao (REJECT)
Teamfight Tactics (Note: Tournament utilizes four-player teams instead of the conventional 1v1 competitive format.)	Team Vision; Zhenbai; Flancy; MoGG; Koyui	Aurora Gaming; 60second A Hao; Huanmie; LiLuo	AG.AL (Note: Due to the Esports World Cup requiring all divisions of a club to have unified branding for the Club Championship, All Gamers competed as AG.AL during the tournament.); A Chen; LiTuChuan; RiYue weimuluoqiu
Tekken 8 (Note: Tournament contains a qualification berth to the Tekken World Tour Finals 2026.)	M. Zubair (AG.AL)	LowHigh (Kiwoom DRX)	Yagami (Note: The player competed as a free agent during the tournament.)
Trackmania	Gwen (AG.AL)	Epos (Team Liquid)	Pac (Team Vitality)
Valorant	100 Thieves vora Asuna; Cryo; Timotino bang	NRG; Ethan mada brawk skuba keiko	Nongshim RedForce; Rb; Xross; Dambi; Francis; Ivy

== Prize pool ==
The 2026 Esports World Cup featured a prize pool of US$75 million, which surpassed the $71.5 million from last year. $30 million were allocated for the top 24 teams in this year's Club Championship, an increase from $27 million last year, though the champion club still received $7 million. $39 million were distributed across the 25 events for their respective prize pools.

Prize money distribution
Category	Prize
Club Championship	$30,000,000
Game Championships	$39,000,000
Qualifiers	$6,000,000
MVP Awards	$475,000 ($25,000 per title)
Jafonso Awards (Note: To be awarded if a team or player who qualified via a Last Chance Qualifier won a tournament (only active for Call of Duty: Black Ops 7, Chess, Counter-Strike 2, EA Sports FC 26, Fatal Fury: City of the Wolves, Rocket League, Street Fighter 6 and Tekken 8). It is named after João "Jafonso" Vasconcellos, who won the EA Sports FC tournament at the 2024 Esports World Cup after having qualified from the Last Chance Qualifier.)	Up to $400,000 ($50,000 per title)

Club Championship prize money distribution
Pos.	Team	Prize	Pos.	Team	Prize
1	AG.AL	$7,000,000	14	Nongshim RedForce	$400,000
2	Team Falcons	$5,000,000	15	BIG	$308,333.33
3	Team Vitality	$4,000,000	15	FaZe Clan	$308,333.33
4	Natus Vincere	$3,000,000	15	G2 Esports	$308,333.33
5	Team Liquid	$2,000,000	18	Weibo Gaming	$250,000
6	Team Spirit	$1,275,000	19	FURIA	$212,500
6	Virtus.pro	$1,275,000	19	Karmine Corp	$212,500
8	Aurora Gaming	$950,000	21	REJECT	$175,000
9	Twisted Minds	$800,000	22	Kiwoom DRX	$125,000
10	T1	$650,000	22	Spacestation Gaming	$125,000
11	Team Vision	$550,000	22	Team Heretics	$125,000
12	100 Thieves	$475,000			
12	ZETA DIVISION	$475,000			
