= 2026 LEC season =

- League: LEC
- Sport: League of Legends
- Duration: 17 January – 1 March (LEC Versus); 28 March – 7 June (Spring); 24 July – 20 September (Summer)
- Teams: 12 (LEC Versus); 10 (Spring & Summer)

LEC Versus
- Winners: G2 Esports
- Runners-up: Karmine Corp
- Season MVP: Rasmus "Caps" Winther (G2 Esports)

Spring
- Champions: G2 Esports
- Runners-up: Karmine Corp
- Season MVP: Kaan "Naak Nako" Okan (Team Vitality)

Summer
- Champions: G2 Esports
- Runners-up: Movistar KOI
- Season MVP: Caliste "Caliste" Henry-Hennebert (Karmine Corp)

LEC seasons
- ← 2025 2027 →

The 2026 LEC season was the 14th season of the League of Legends EMEA Championship (LEC), a professional esports league for the video game League of Legends. It was the first LEC season since 2018, then known as the European League Championship Series (EU LCS), to feature teams from the Tier 2 EMEA Regional Leagues (ERLs), as two teams were invited to compete in the league's first split. The season began on 17 January and ended on 20 September.

G2 Esports won all three splits of the season, defeating Karmine Corp in the final of LEC Versus and the Spring Split, and Movistar KOI in the Summer Split. Through this feat, the team qualified for all three international tournaments (First Stand Tournament, Mid-Season Invitational, World Championship), being one of four teams to do so across all six Tier 1 regions.

Aside from G2 Esports, Karmine Corp qualified for both MSI 2026 and the World Championship, while Movistar KOI also qualified for Worlds as the second seed.

== League changes ==
=== First split ===
On 23 October 2025, the LEC announced that the Winter Split would be removed and will be replaced with the "LEC Versus" tournament, featuring the ten (10) LEC partner teams and two (2) EMEA Regional League (ERL) teams. The two invited teams will only compete in the said event but not in the Spring and Summer splits, as they will be returning to their respective leagues after the tournament.

=== Teams ===
For the LEC Versus event, twelve teams competed. Aside from the ten (10) LEC teams, two (2) EMEA Regional League (ERL) teams were invited. One of which was Karmine Corp Blue (academy team of Karmine Corp) of the Ligue Française de League of Legends (LFL) as the 2025 EMEA Masters Summer Split champions. The other invited team was Los Ratones of the Northern League of Legends Championship (NLC), founded and coached by former LEC player and caster Marc "Caedrel" Lamont, as the best performing team across the ERLs during the 2025 EMEA Masters season. Both teams were eligible to qualify for the 2026 First Stand Tournament in Brazil.

On 15 December 2025, Team BDS rebranded to Shifters. BDS announced a change of brand identity in June 2025, following the hiring of Alexandre Lopez as their new CEO to replace team founder Patrice Bailo De Spoelberch. De Spoelberch was removed from his position in November 2024 following a now-deleted post on X that criticized women who underwent abortion.

=== Formats ===
Both the Spring and Summer splits will follow the same format, removing the groups format from the 2025 Summer split.

== Road shows ==
Some games of the 2026 season were held outside of the Riot Games Arena in Berlin. On 15 January 2026, the LEC announced six events of the "LEC Roadtrip" across Spain and France hosted by Movistar KOI and Karmine Corp, respectively. Barcelona would host the LEC Versus Finals Weekend from 27 February–1 March at the Olimpic Arena, while Madrid would stage two events at the Madrid Arena from 8–10 May for the Spring Split and from 5–6 September for the Summer Split. Paris will also host two events: one from 24–26 April at the Les Arènes for the Spring Split and one from 24–26 July at the Adidas Arena for the Summer Split.

The 2026 LEC Summer Split Finals Weekend will be held at the Palais Nikaïa in Nice, France from 18–20 September.

== LEC Versus ==
=== Format ===
The LEC Versus event featured twelve (12) teams competing in a single-round robin tournament where all matches were played in best-of-ones. The top eight (8) teams qualified for the playoffs, which will be an eight-team Double-elimination tournament bracket. Matches in the first two upper and lower rounds were contested in best-of-threes, while subsequent matches until the finals were played in best-of-fives. The winner of the LEC Versus event represented the league as its lone representative at the 2026 First Stand Tournament.

=== Regular season ===
Venue: Riot Games Arena, Berlin, Germany

Pos	Team	Pld	W	L	PCT	Qualification
1	Karmine Corp	11	8	3	.727	Playoffs
2	Natus Vincere	11	7	4	.636	Playoffs
3	Team Vitality	11	7	4	.636	Playoffs
4	Team Heretics	11	6	5	.545	Playoffs
5	GIANTX	11	6	5	.545	Playoffs
6	Movistar KOI	11	6	5	.545	Playoffs
7	G2 Esports	11	6	5	.545	Playoffs
8	Fnatic	11	5	6	.455	Playoffs
9	Los Ratones	11	5	6	.455	Eliminated
10	Shifters	11	5	6	.455	Eliminated
11	SK Gaming	11	3	8	.273	Eliminated
12	Karmine Corp Blue	11	2	9	.182	Eliminated

Updated to match(es) played on 8 February 2026. Source: LoL Esports

=== Playoffs ===
Venues:

- Riot Games Arena, Berlin, Germany
- Olimpic Arena, Barcelona, Spain

Upper quarterfinals	Upper semifinals	Upper final	Final
17 February – Berlin
1	Karmine Corp	2
20 February – Berlin
5	GIANTX	0
1	Karmine Corp	0
17 February – Berlin
7	G2 Esports	2
4	Team Heretics	0
23 February – Berlin
7	G2 Esports	2
7	G2 Esports	3
16 February – Berlin
6	Movistar KOI	0
2	Natus Vincere	2
20 February – Berlin
8	Fnatic	0
2	Natus Vincere	0
16 February – Berlin
6	Movistar KOI	2
3	Team Vitality	0	1 March – Barcelona
6	Movistar KOI	2	7	G2 Esports	3
1	Karmine Corp	2
Lower round 1	Lower quarterfinals	Lower semifinals	Lower final
22 February – Berlin
21 February – Berlin	2	Natus Vincere	1	28 February – Barcelona
4	Team Heretics	1	5	GIANTX	2	27 February – Barcelona	6	Movistar KOI	2
5	GIANTX	2	5	GIANTX	0	1	Karmine Corp	3
22 February – Berlin	1	Karmine Corp	3
21 February – Berlin	1	Karmine Corp	2
3	Team Vitality	2	3	Team Vitality	1
8	Fnatic	0

Source: LoL Esports

=== Awards ===
Award	Player	Team
Finals MVP	Caps	G2 Esports

== Spring ==
=== Format ===
The Spring Split featured the ten (10) LEC partner teams, where they competed in a single-round robin tournament where all matches were played in best-of-threes. The top six (6) teams advanced to the playoffs. The playoffs were contested in a Double-elimination tournament bracket, where the top (4) teams in the standings being seeded in the upper round and the next two (2) teams in the lower round. All matches were played in best-of-fives. The finalists of the Spring Split qualified for the 2026 Mid-Season Invitational, with the split winner advancing directly to the bracket stage and the runner-up advancing to the play-in round.

=== Regular season ===
Venues:

- Riot Games Arena, Berlin, Germany
- Madrid Arena, Madrid, Spain
- Les Arènes, Paris, France

Pos	Team	Pld	W	L	PCT	Qualification
1	Team Vitality	9	8	1	.889	Playoffs
2	Karmine Corp	9	7	2	.778	Playoffs
3	G2 Esports	9	6	3	.667	Playoffs
4	Movistar KOI	9	6	3	.667	Playoffs
5	Natus Vincere	9	6	3	.667	Playoffs
6	GIANTX	9	5	4	.556	Playoffs
7	Fnatic	9	3	6	.333	Eliminated
8	SK Gaming	9	2	7	.222	Eliminated
9	Shifters	9	1	8	.111	Eliminated
10	Team Heretics	9	1	8	.111	Eliminated

Updated to match(es) played on 10 May 2026. Source: LoL Esports

=== Playoffs ===
Venue: Riot Games Arena, Berlin, Germany

Upper semifinals	Upper final	Final
24 May
1	Team Vitality	0
25 May
4	Movistar KOI	3
4	Movistar KOI	2
23 May
3	G2 Esports	3
2	Karmine Corp	1
3	G2 Esports	3	7 June
3	G2 Esports	3
Lower quarterfinals	Lower semifinals	Lower final	2	Karmine Corp	2
30 May
6 June
5	Natus Vincere	1
1 June	4	Movistar KOI	0
2	Karmine Corp	3
2	Karmine Corp	3	2	Karmine Corp	3
31 May
6	GIANTX	0
6	GIANTX	3
1	Team Vitality	0

Source: LoL Esports

=== Awards ===
- Most Valuable Player: Naak Nako, Team Vitality
- Finals MVP: SkewMond, G2 Esports
- 1st All-Pro Team:
  - T Naak Nako, Team Vitality
  - J SkewMond, G2 Esports
  - M Jojopyun, Movistar KOI
  - B Caliste, Karmine Corp
  - S Busio, Karmine Corp
- 2nd All-Pro Team:
  - T Canna, Karmine Corp
  - J Yike, Karmine Corp
  - M Caps, G2 Esports
  - B Hans Sama, G2 Esports
  - S Fleshy, Team Vitality
- 3rd All-Pro Team:
  - T BrokenBlade, G2 Esports
  - J Lyncas, Team Vitality
  - M kyeahoo, Karmine Corp
  - B Carzzy, Team Vitality
  - S Labrov, G2 Esports

== Summer ==
=== Format ===
Unlike the previous season, the Summer split followed the Spring format, where the same ten (10) competing teams faced each other in a single-round robin tournament of best-of-three matches. The top six (6) teams advanced to the playoffs, applying the same format and team seeding principles as the Spring split. All playoff matches were played in best-of-fives, with the top three (3) teams in the playoffs securing qualification for the 2026 League of Legends World Championship.

=== Regular season ===
Venues:

- Riot Games Arena, Berlin, Germany
- Adidas Arena, Paris, France

Pos	Team	Pld	W	L	PCT	Qualification
1	Karmine Corp	9	9	0	1.000	Playoffs
2	Team Vitality	9	7	2	.778	Playoffs
3	G2 Esports	9	6	3	.667	Playoffs
4	GIANTX	9	5	4	.556	Playoffs
5	Natus Vincere	9	5	4	.556	Playoffs
6	Movistar KOI	9	4	5	.444	Playoffs
7	SK Gaming	9	3	6	.333	Eliminated
8	Fnatic	9	3	6	.333	Eliminated
9	Team Heretics	9	2	7	.222	Eliminated
10	Shifters	9	1	8	.111	Eliminated

Updated to match(es) played on 30 August 2026. Source: LoL Esports

=== Playoffs ===
Venues:

- Riot Games Arena, Berlin, Germany
- Madrid Arena, Madrid, Spain
- Palais Nikaïa, Nice, France

Upper semifinals	Upper final	Final
5 September – Madrid
1	Karmine Corp	3
6 September – Madrid
4	GIANTX	1
1	Karmine Corp	1
5 September – Madrid
3	G2 Esports	3
2	Team Vitality	0
3	G2 Esports	3	20 September – Nice
3	G2 Esports	3
Lower quarterfinals	Lower semifinals	Lower final	6	Movistar KOI	0
11 September – Berlin
19 September – Nice
5	Natus Vincere	3
18 September – Nice	1	Karmine Corp	0
4	GIANTX	2
5	Natus Vincere	1	6	Movistar KOI	3
12 September – Berlin
6	Movistar KOI	3
6	Movistar KOI	3
2	Team Vitality	2

Source: LoL Esports

=== Awards ===
- Most Valuable Player: Caliste, Karmine Corp
- Finals MVP: Labrov, G2 Esports
- All-Pro First Place:
  - T Canna, Karmine Corp
  - J Yike, Karmine Corp
  - M kyeahoo, Karmine Corp
  - B Caliste, Karmine Corp
  - S Busio, Karmine Corp
- All-Pro Second Place:
  - T Naak Nako, Team Vitality
  - J SkewMond, G2 Esports
  - M Caps, G2 Esports
  - B Hans Sama, G2 Esports
  - S Labrov, G2 Esports
- All-Pro Third Place:
  - T BrokenBlade, G2 Esports
  - J Rhilech, Natus Vincere
  - M Jojopyun, Movistar KOI
  - B Carzzy, Team Vitality
  - S Jun, GIANTX
