= Hans Sama =

French League of Legends player (born 1999)

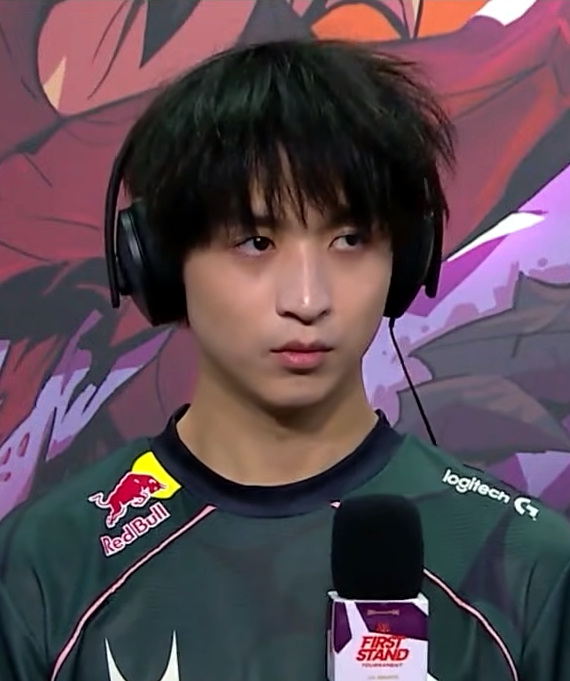
- Hans Sama in 2026

Personal information
- Name: Steven Liv
- Born: September 2, 1999 (age 27)
- Nationality: French

Current team
- Team: G2 Esports
- Role: Bot Laner
- Game: League of Legends
- League: LEC

Career information
- Playing career: 2014–present

Team history
- 2014–2015: The Gentle Team
- 2015: E-corp Gentle
- 2015–2016: Millenium
- 2016–2019: Misfits Gaming
- 2019: Misfits Premier
- 2020–2021: Rogue
- 2022: Team Liquid
- 2023–present: G2 Esports

Career highlights and awards
- 11x LEC champion; 1x LEC Finals MVP; 3x LEC 1st All-Pro Team; LCS Lock-In champion (2022); 1x LCS 1st All-Pro Team

Steven Liv, better known as Hans Sama, is a French professional League of Legends player for G2 Esports. Liv has previously played for Team Liquid in the League of Legends Championship Series (LCS), as well as Rogue and Misfits in the League of Legends EMEA Championship (LEC).

== Professional career ==
=== Misfits ===
Hans joined Misfits at age 16, in June 2016. At the time, Misfits was a new organization in the European Challenger Series (CS). The team placed first in the CS regular season, and were eligible for the European promotion tournament, where they defeated FC Schalke 04 and claimed their spot in the EU LCS; the highest level of professional play in Europe. At the end of the year, Hans signed a 2-year contract with Misfits, before even playing a single game in the EU LCS.

The following year, Hans and Misfits found spring success, qualifying for playoffs and reaching the Semifinals, and in summer, they made it all the way to the finals match, before falling to G2. However, due to their combined fourth and second place finishes, the team automatically qualified for the 2017 League of Legends World Championship as Europe's second seed. At Worlds 2017, Misfits advanced past the group stage with a 3–3 record, and met tournament favorites SKT T1 in the Quarterfinals. Despite being heavy underdogs, Hans and Misfits held up against the Korean squad, taking the series to a full five games before losing a close Game 5, and drew praise from the league community for their impressive showing, despite the loss.

After proving themselves a contender on the international stage, Misfits performed poorly in spring 2018, and finished the regular season with an 8–10 record, missing playoffs. In summer they rebounded enough to return to the postseason, but finished in fourth after losing the third place match to Vitality. Due to his team's results, Hans did not attend Worlds in 2018.

In 2019, Misfits brought together an impressive lineup, including sOAZ, Febiven, and GorillA, while retaining Hans and Maxlore, and were expected to once again be competitive internationally. However the team flopped, placing eighth in spring and ninth in summer, with a combined 12–21 record on the year, making no playoff appearances and attending no international events. Halfway through the summer split, Misfits substituted out the entire starting roster, including Hans, but did not see improvement. Misfits broke up after an extremely disappointing 2019 season, and Hans left the team.

=== Rogue ===
Hans joined Rogue ahead of the 2020 LEC season. In the spring split, Rogue made the playoffs, claiming the last spot with a 9–9 record, but lost in the second round. In summer however, Rogue went 13–5 achieving first place in the LEC and qualifying for Worlds 2020. But in the first round of the playoffs, they were swept by Fnatic and dropped to the lower bracket. They won their next series against MAD Lions, before losing to G2 and finishing third, giving them the third seed at the World Championship. At the tournament, Rogue went 1–5 in the group stage, placing last in their group and finishing 13th–14th.

In January 2021, Hans resigned with Rogue through the end of the 2022 season. When spring started, Hans and Rogue once again enjoyed regular season success, going 14–4 and tying with G2 for the best record in the LEC. In playoffs, despite losing their first match to MAD Lions, Rogue went on to defeat FC Schalke 04 and G2 to make finals, where they lost their rematch against MAD Lions in a close 5 game series. In the Summer split, Rogue finishing the regular season in first, at 13–5, marking the third straight split in which Hans' team won 13 or more games. In they playoffs, Rogue defeated Misfits in the first round, which qualified them for the 2021 World Championship, before being swept by both MAD Lions and Fnatic, giving them a third place finish. At Worlds 2021, Rogue were drawn into Group A, which contained both of the tournament favorites, and winners of the two previous World Championships: China's FunPlusPhoenix and Korea's Damwon Kia. This group wad dubbed the "Group of death" by the media, and along with North America's Cloud9, Rogue were not expected to be able to advance. However at the end of the double–round–robin, Damwon held a 6–0 record, while the other three teams, including Rogue, were tied at 2–4 each. Rogue upset FPX in the first tiebreaker, before falling to Cloud9 in the second, failing to qualify for the knockout stage.

=== Team Liquid ===
After Worlds concluded, Team Liquid of the LCS acquired Hans Sama from Rogue, buying out his contract for an undisclosed amount. In the preseason Lock–In tournament, Hans did not play in all the games, as the team rotated their roster. Team Liquid's support and Hans' botlaner partner, CoreJJ, had not yet received his green card, and the team could only play two non-resident players, therefore the team rotated between Bwipo, Hans, and CoreJJ. Despite not having their full roster, Team Liquid won the Lock–In tournament, defeating Evil Geniuses 3–0 in the finals. On February 16, CoreJJ acquired his green card.

Hans sama left Team Liquid at the end of the season after failing to qualify for the 2022 World Championship.

=== G2 Esports ===
For the 2023 season, Hans signed with G2 Esports. During his first split back in the European region, Hans won his maiden LEC title, defeating MAD Lions in the final 3–0 to qualify for the 2023 Mid-Season Invitational.

== Seasons overview ==
Year	Team	Domestic						Regional	International		
Year	Team	League	Split					Rift Rivals	First Stand	Mid-Season Invitational	World Championship
Year	Team	League	Versus	Winter	Spring	Summer	Season Finals	Rift Rivals	First Stand	Mid-Season Invitational	World Championship
2016	Millenium	EU CS	—N/a	—N/a	4th	—	—N/a	—N/a	—N/a	—	
2016	Misfits Gaming	EU CS	—N/a	—N/a	—	1st	—N/a	—N/a	—N/a	—	
2017	Misfits Gaming	EU LCS	—N/a	—N/a	4th	2nd	—N/a	Did not qualify	—N/a	Did not qualify	5–8th
2018	Misfits Gaming	EU LCS	—N/a	—N/a	7th	4th	—N/a	Did not qualify	—N/a	Did not qualify	Did not qualify
2019	Misfits Gaming	LEC	—N/a	—N/a	8th	9th	—N/a	Did not qualify	—N/a	Did not qualify	Did not qualify
2019	Misfits Premier	LFL	—N/a	—N/a	—	4th	—N/a	—	—N/a	—	
2020	Rogue	LEC	—N/a	—N/a	5th	3rd	—N/a	—N/a	—N/a	None held (Note: Cancelled due to the COVID-19 pandemic.)	13th–14th
2021	Rogue	LEC	—N/a	—N/a	2nd	3rd	—N/a	—N/a	—N/a	Did not qualify	9th–11th
2022	Team Liquid	LCS	—N/a	—N/a	3rd	4th	—N/a	—N/a	—N/a	Did not qualify	Did not qualify
2023	G2 Esports	LEC	—N/a	1st	4th	1st	1st	—N/a	—N/a	5th–6th	9th–11th
2024	G2 Esports	LEC	—N/a	1st	1st	1st	1st	—N/a	—N/a	4th	9th–11th
2025	G2 Esports	LEC	—N/a	2nd	2nd	1st	—N/a	—N/a	Did not qualify	7th–8th	5th–8th
2026	G2 Esports	LEC	1st	—N/a	1st	1st	—N/a	—N/a	2nd	4th	12th–14th

== Awards and honors ==
LEC

- Eleven-time LEC champion – Winter 2023, Summer 2023, Season Finals 2023, Winter 2024, Spring 2024, Summer 2024, Season Finals 2024, Summer 2025, Versus 2026, Spring 2026, Summer 2026
- One-time LEC Finals MVP – Season Finals 2024
- Three-time LEC 1st All-Pro Team – Winter 2023, Summer 2023, Winter 2024
- Five-time LEC 2nd All-Pro Team – Summer 2020, Spring 2021, Summer 2021, Spring 2026, Summer 2026
- Five-time LEC 3rd All-Pro Team – Spring 2017, Spring 2018, Summer 2018, Spring 2023, Spring 2025

LCS

- One-time LCS Lock-In champion – 2022
- One-time LCS 1st All-Pro Team – Spring 2022

EU CS

- One-time EU CS champion – Summer 2016

Tournaments

- ESL Championnat National Autumn – 2016
- Gamers Assembly – 2016
- Challenge France Spring – 2016
- Lyon e-Sport 9 – 2016
- Millenium Predator Tournament – 2015
- ASUS Republic of Gamers – 2015
- PGL Legends of the Rift Season 1: Last Chance – 2015
- ESL Go4LoL France May – 2015
