= 2024 LEC season =

Electronic sports season

- League: LEC
- Sport: League of Legends
- Duration: 13 Jan – 18 Feb (Winter); 9 Mar – 14 Apr (Spring); 8 Jun – 28 Jul (Summer); 10 Aug – 1 Sep (Season Finals)
- Teams: 10

Winter
- Champions: G2 Esports
- Runners-up: MAD Lions KOI

Spring
- Champions: G2 Esports
- Runners-up: Fnatic

Summer
- Champions: G2 Esports
- Runners-up: Fnatic

Season Finals
- Champions: G2 Esports
- Runners-up: Fnatic

LEC seasons
- ← 2023 2025 →

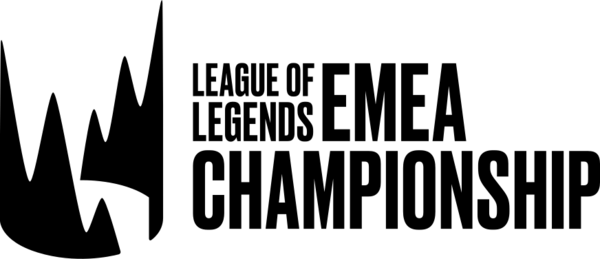
The new LEC logo

The 2024 LEC season is the 12th season of the League of Legends EMEA Championship (LEC), a professional esports league for the MOBA PC game League of Legends. The season is divided into three splits, Winter, Spring, and Summer, and will culminate with the LEC Season Finals.

Three team changes occurred leading up to the 2024 season, with Astralis selling their LEC franchise slot to Karmine Corp, KOI effectively rebranding to Rogue, and Excel Esports rebranding to GIANTX.

== League changes ==
=== Format and eligibility ===
In contrast to previous season, the LEC merged the group and playoff stages into one double-elimination tournament playoff for the 2024 season. It will maintain the same number of best-of-three and best-of-five series as the previous year. Additionally, teams that can face can face each other in the upper bracket of the playoffs will not face each other in the lower bracket, aside from the lower bracket final. The league also put increased emphasis on the Summer Split, with winner of the Summer Finals automatically qualifying for the 2024 World Championship and giving both the second- and third-place finishers in the Summer Split Playoffs a spot in the LEC Season Finals as well. Additionally, any ties in Championship Points heading into the LEC Season Finals are broken by which team earned the higher number of Championship Points in Summer.

The league increased the time in between the Winter and Spring splits and Spring and the Mid-Season Invitational by one week. The break between Summer split and the LEC Season Finals will be shortened by one week.

The LEC also increased the minimum age requirement to compete from 17 to 18. Riot said the reason for the age limit increase was to "enable teams and the LEC to explore additional revenue opportunities."

=== Teams ===
Several team changes occurred heading into the 2024 season. In October 2023, La Ligue Française team Karmine Corp purchased the LEC franchise slot of Astralis. The following month, KOI ended their partnership with Infinite Reality, splitting their esports assets. With the split, Infinite Reality retained the LEC franchise position and reverted their branding back to Rogue. OverActive Media, owner of MAD Lions, would then buy KOI (as well as Movistar Riders) in January 2024, rebranding their League team to MAD Lions KOI. In December 2023, Excel Esports and Giants Gaming merged. As a result, LEC franchise Excel Esports rebranded to GIANTX.

== Winter ==
The Winter Split regular season began on 13 January 2024. All matches took place at the Riot Games Arena in Berlin, Germany. The split concluded with the Winter Split Final on 18 February.

=== Regular season ===
Pos	Team	Pld	W	L	PCT	Qualification
1	G2 Esports	9	7	2	.778	Advance to playoffs
2	Team BDS	9	7	2	.778	Advance to playoffs
3	SK Gaming	9	5	4	.556	Advance to playoffs
4	MAD Lions KOI	9	5	4	.556	Advance to playoffs
5	Fnatic	9	5	4	.556	Advance to playoffs
6	Team Vitality	9	4	5	.444	Advance to playoffs
7	Team Heretics	9	4	5	.444	Advance to playoffs
8	GIANTX	9	4	5	.444	Advance to playoffs
9	Rogue	9	2	7	.222	
10	Karmine Corp	9	2	7	.222	

Source: LoL Esports

=== Playoffs ===
Upper quarterfinals	Upper semifinals	Upper final	Final
1	G2 Esports	2
8	GIANTX	0
1	G2 Esports	2
5	Fnatic	1
4	MAD Lions KOI	0
5	Fnatic	2
1	G2 Esports	3
2	Team BDS	0
2	Team BDS	2
7	Team Heretics	0
2	Team BDS	2
6	Team Vitality	0
3	SK Gaming	0
6	Team Vitality	2	1	G2 Esports	3
4	MAD Lions KOI	1
Lower round 1	Lower quarterfinals	Lower semifinals	Lower final
5	Fnatic	2
3	SK Gaming	2	3	SK Gaming	1	2	Team BDS	2
7	Team Heretics	1	5	Fnatic	2	4	MAD Lions KOI	3
4	MAD Lions KOI	3
6	Team Vitality	0
4	MAD Lions KOI	2	4	MAD Lions KOI	2
8	GIANTX	0

Source: LoL Esports

=== Awards ===
Award	Player	Team
Finals MVP	BrokenBlade	G2 Esports
Team of the Split		G2 Esports
Team of the Split	BrokenBlade	G2 Esports
Team of the Split	Yike	G2 Esports
Team of the Split	Caps	G2 Esports
Team of the Split	Hans Sama	G2 Esports
Team of the Split	Mikyx	G2 Esports

== Spring ==
The Spring Split regular will begin on 9 March 2024. The split will conclude with the Spring Split Final on 14 April.

=== Regular season ===
Pos	Team	Pld	W	L	PCT	Qualification
1	Fnatic	9	6	3	.667	Advance to playoffs
2	Team Vitality	9	6	3	.667	Advance to playoffs
3	G2 Esports	9	6	3	.667	Advance to playoffs
4	Team Heretics	9	6	3	.667	Advance to playoffs
5	Team BDS	9	5	4	.556	Advance to playoffs
6	GIANTX	9	4	5	.444	Advance to playoffs
7	MAD Lions KOI	9	4	5	.444	Advance to playoffs
8	SK Gaming	9	3	6	.333	Advance to playoffs
9	Rogue	9	3	6	.333	
10	Karmine Corp	9	2	7	.222	

Source: LoL Esports

=== Playoffs ===
Upper quarterfinals	Upper semifinals	Upper final	Final
1	Fnatic	2
6	GIANTX	0
1	Fnatic	0
3	G2 Esports	2
3	G2 Esports	2
7	MAD Lions KOI	0
3	G2 Esports	3
5	Team BDS	1
2	Team Vitality	2
8	SK Gaming	1
2	Team Vitality	1
5	Team BDS	2
4	Team Heretics	0
5	Team BDS	2	3	G2 Esports	3
1	Fnatic	1
Lower round 1	Lower quarterfinals	Lower semifinals	Lower final
1	Fnatic	2
4	Team Heretics	2	4	Team Heretics	1	5	Team BDS	2
8	SK Gaming	1	1	Fnatic	3	1	Fnatic	3
2	Team Vitality	1
2	Team Vitality	2
6	GIANTX	1	7	MAD Lions KOI	0
7	MAD Lions KOI	2

Source: LoL Esports

=== Awards ===
Award	Player	Team
Finals MVP	Caps	G2 Esports
Team of the Split		G2 Esports
Team of the Split	BrokenBlade	G2 Esports
Team of the Split	Razork	Fnatic
Team of the Split	Caps	G2 Esports
Team of the Split	Ice	Team BDS
Team of the Split	Jun	Fnatic

== Summer ==
The summer split will begin on 8 June, with the regular season ending on 30 June. After a one week break to allow for the League of Legends tournament at the 2024 Esports World Cup in Saudi Arabia, the playoffs will run from 12 to 28 July.

=== Regular season ===
Pos	Team	Pld	W	L	PCT	Qualification
1	SK Gaming	9	8	1	.889	Advance to playoffs
2	Team BDS	9	8	1	.889	Advance to playoffs
3	G2 Esports	9	7	2	.778	Advance to playoffs
4	Fnatic	9	6	3	.667	Advance to playoffs
5	Karmine Corp	9	4	5	.444	Advance to playoffs
6	Team Heretics	9	3	6	.333	Advance to playoffs
7	GIANTX	9	3	6	.333	Advance to playoffs
8	MAD Lions KOI	9	2	7	.222	Advance to playoffs
9	Team Vitality	9	2	7	.222	
10	Rogue	9	2	7	.222	

Source: LoL Esports

=== Playoffs ===
Upper quarterfinals	Upper semifinals	Upper final	Final
1	SK Gaming	2
6	Team Heretics	0
1	SK Gaming	0
4	Fnatic	2
4	Fnatic	2
7	GIANTX	1
4	Fnatic	3
3	G2 Esports	2
2	Team BDS	2
8	MAD Lions KOI	1
2	Team BDS	0
3	G2 Esports	2
3	G2 Esports	2
5	Karmine Corp	0	4	Fnatic	0
3	G2 Esports	3
Lower round 1	Lower quarterfinals	Lower semifinals	Lower final
1	SK Gaming	1
5	Karmine Corp	2	5	Karmine Corp	2	3	G2 Esports	3
8	MAD Lions KOI	0	5	Karmine Corp	2	2	Team BDS	1
2	Team BDS	3
2	Team BDS	2
6	Team Heretics	1	7	GIANTX	1
7	GIANTX	2

Source: LoL Esports

=== Awards ===
Award	Player	Team
Finals MVP	Caps	G2 Esports

== Season Finals ==
=== Qualification ===
A total of six teams will qualify for the Season Finals. The winner of each split, as well as the second- and third-placed teams from the Summer Split are automatically qualified, while the remaining teams are determined based on Championship Points. Teams are awarded Championship Points at the end of each split based on their performance, and seeding in the Season Finals is determined by a combination of Championship Points and Summer Playoffs placement.

Pos	Team	Win	Spr	Sum	Total	Qualification
1	G2 Esports (Note: Automatically qualified as the winner of the Winter, Spring and Summer Splits.)	120	145	180	445	Upper bracket semifinals
2	Fnatic	60	120	150	330	Upper bracket semifinals
3	Team BDS	80	95	120	295	Upper bracket semifinals
4	MAD Lions KOI	100	55	45	200	Upper bracket semifinals
5	SK Gaming	45	35	65	145	Lower bracket quarterfinals
6	GIANTX	30	35	65	130	Lower bracket quarterfinals
7	Team Heretics	30	55	45	130	
8	Team Vitality	45	70	0	115	
9	Karmine Corp	0	0	90	90	
10	Rogue	0	0	0	0	

Source: LoL Esports

=== Bracket ===
Venues:

- Riot Games Arena, Berlin, Germany
- Olympiahalle, Munich, Germany

Upper semifinals	Upper final	Final
11 August – Berlin
1	G2 Esports	2
24 August – Berlin
4	MAD Lions KOI	3
4	MAD Lions KOI	2
10 August – Berlin
2	Fnatic	3
2	Fnatic	3
3	Team BDS	0	1 September – Munich
2	Fnatic	1
Lower quarterfinals	Lower semifinals	Lower final	1	G2 Esports	3
18 August – Berlin
31 August – Munich
1	G2 Esports	3
23 August – Berlin	4	MAD Lions KOI	1
6	GIANTX	0
1	G2 Esports	3	1	G2 Esports	3
17 August – Berlin
3	Team BDS	2
3	Team BDS	3
5	SK Gaming	0

Source: LoL Esports

==== Final standings ====
Pos	Team	Qualification
1	G2 Esports	Worlds 2024 Swiss Stage
2	Fnatic	Worlds 2024 Swiss Stage
3	MAD Lions KOI	Worlds 2024 Play-In Stage
4	Team BDS	
5	SK Gaming	
6	GIANTX	

=== Awards ===
Award	Player	Team
Finals MVP	Hans Sama	G2 Esports

== Awards ==
Award	Player	Team
MVP of the Year	Caps	G2 Esports
Rookie of the Year	Jackies	GIANTX
