= Movistar KOI =

Spanish professional esports organisation

- Short name: MKOI
- Divisions: Call of Duty: Modern Warfare 4 (Note: As Toronto KOI.); League of Legends; Pokémon Champions; Teamfight Tactics
- Founded: 15 December 2021; 4 years ago
- Location: Madrid, Spain
- Colors
- Owner: OverActive Media
- CEO: Adam Adamou
- Partners: Movistar; Cupra; Mahou; HyperX; Razer; Médicos del Mundo; Ecoembes; Ilusiona; Idealo; Philips OneBlade
- Website: movistarkoi.gg

KOI, known as Movistar KOI for sponsorship reasons, is a Spanish professional esports organization owned by OverActive Media. The organization was founded by Internet celebrity and streamer Ibai Llanos and former FC Barcelona footballer Gerard Piqué on 15 December 2021.

From its first months of competition, the organization garnered significant media attention and audience reach in both the Spanish League of Legends and Valorant leagues. Seeking to expand its brand presence, the organization announced on 6 October 2022 a partnership with Infinite Reality and its ReKTGlobal brand, owners of Rogue. This partnership ended on 3 November 2023 following the revelation of non-payments by Infinite Reality and unsuccessful sporting goals. Two months after this separation, on 4 January 2024, OverActive Media, owner of MAD Lions, acquired KOI and Movistar Riders and merged them with MAD Lions, forming Movistar KOI and MAD Lions KOI. The team competed under these names during 2024 until the final merger, announced at the Movistar KOI-Con event on 6 December 2024.

The organization competes with three teams in League of Legends (European LEC and Spanish LES and Circuito Tormenta); one team in Teamfight Tactics; and two players for Pokémon Champions at VGC events. It also has a Call of Duty: Modern Warfare 4 team that competes as Toronto KOI in the CDL.

== History ==
=== 2021–2022: Fundation and early growth ===
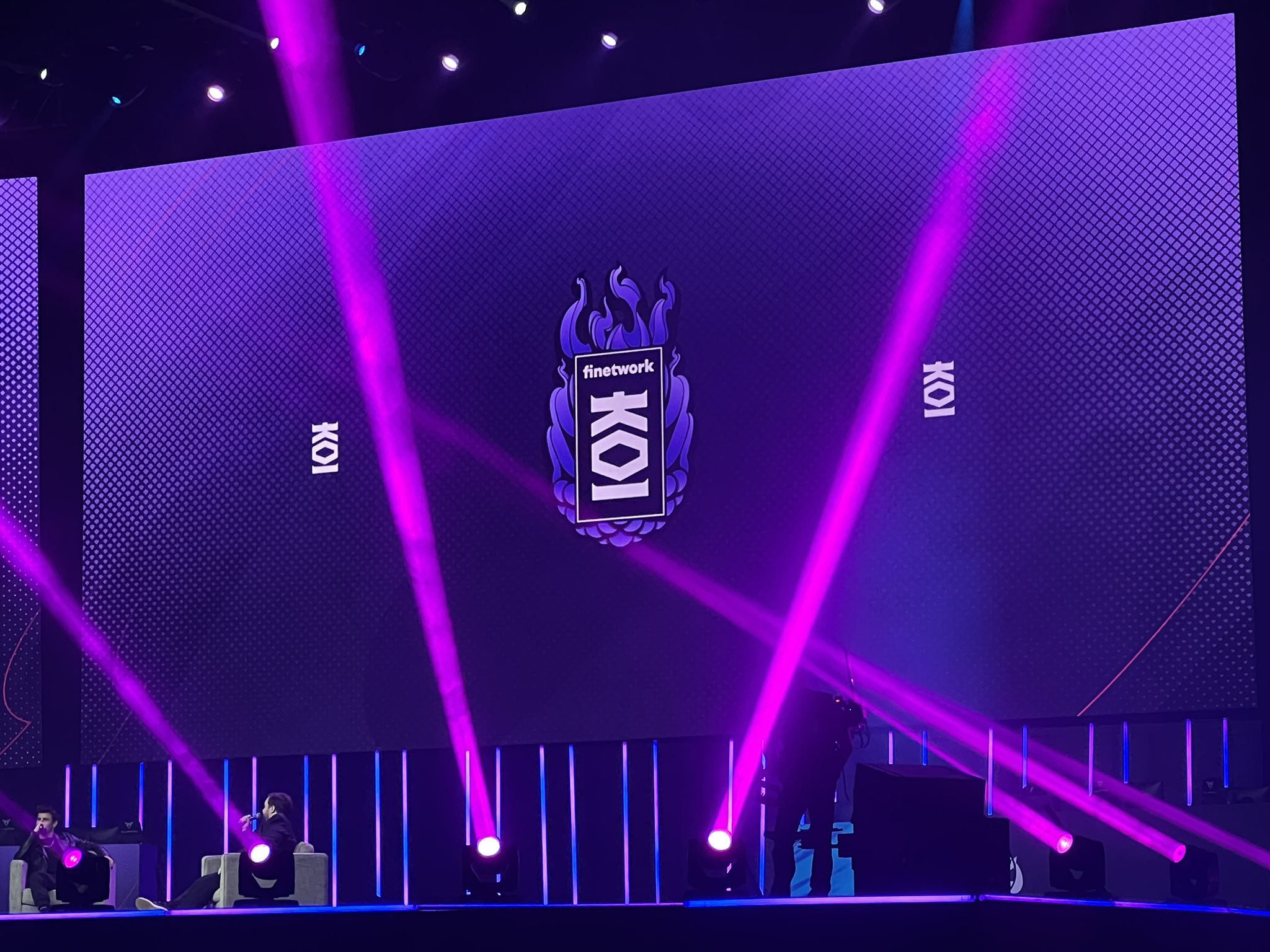
KOI presentation on 15 December 2021 at the Palau Sant Jordi.

On 1 September 2021, content creator Ibai Llanos and then-FC Barcelona footballer Gerard Piqué announced the creation of an esports club that would compete in the Spanish League of Legends Superliga after acquiring a league slot. At the time, the club's name, logo, sponsors, and players had yet to be decided.

The organization was officially founded on 15 December 2021 at an event held at the Palau Sant Jordi in Barcelona, hosted by Llanos and Piqué, which was attended by more than 15,000 people and attracted a peak Twitch viewership of 379,000. During the event, the organization also announced its entry into Valorant and revealed its initial content creators.

In its first months of competition in 2022, the organization quickly attracted significant attention, setting viewership records for Spanish esports broadcasts and drawing large crowds to its matches and events, reinforcing its position as one of Spain and Europe most followed esports organizations. By the end of the year, KOI had expanded its presence across multiple titles.

=== 2022–2023: Brand expansion and instability ===
Following rapid growth and significant impact on the Spanish esports scene, the organization sought to expand its brand internationally and establish a presence in major European competitions.

On 6 October 2022, Goatch Global, KOI's parent company, announced a strategic partnership with Infinite Reality and its brand ReKTGlobal, the owner of Rogue. Under the agreement, Rogue's competitive teams in League of Legends, Rainbow Six Siege and Rocket League would compete under the KOI brand from the 2023 season.

The partnership represented a major step in KOI's expansion, particularly in League of Legends, where the organization gained access to the League of Legends EMEA Championship (LEC), Europe's top-tier competition. However, the collaboration was ultimately affected by poor sporting results and financial difficulties, reportedly linked to Infinite Reality's failure to meet its financial obligations. On 3 November 2023, KOI and Infinite Reality ended their partnership. It was subsequently reported that Ibai Llanos had invested more than €3 million of his own money to cover payments to employees, players and content creators during the organization's financial difficulties.

=== 2023–present: New beginning and consolidation ===
After finishing its partnership with Infinite Reality in November 2023, KOI entered a restructuring period known as "Operación Fénix" (Operation Phoenix), focused on rebuilding the organization and strengthening its position in the Spanish esports scene.

On 4 January 2024, Goatch Global (KOI) was acquired along with Team Randomk Esports (Movistar Riders) by OverActive Media, the owner of MAD Lions. OAM decided to merge the three Spanish organizations under the KOI brand, competing for the 2024 season as Movistar KOI and MAD Lions KOI. On 28 February, it was announced that Movistar had renewed its contract as the main sponsor for three more years, through the end of 2026, having sponsored Riders since 2017.

At the Movistar KOI-Con event held on 6 December 2024 at the Palacio Vistalegre in Madrid, the final merger was announced, with the organization now competing solely as Movistar KOI.

In 2025, KOI hosted a two-day sold-out LEC Roadtrip event in Madrid, attracting 18,000 attendees and marking the competition's return to Spain after seven years. During the event, the organization announced the launch of Fénix Club Gaming, its official membership program. Later that year, KOI gained access to the Call of Duty League (CDL) through Toronto Ultra—another brand owned by OverActive Media—which began competing under the KOI brand in the 2026 season.

== Divisions ==
=== Call of Duty: Modern Warfare 4 ===
On 23 October 2025, it was announced that Toronto Ultra—the other brand owned by OverActive Media—would become part of the KOI brand as Toronto KOI. The team competes in the Call of Duty League (CDL), where it has won three Stage (2021 Major II, 2023 Major III and 2024 Major I) and played in two Championship Grand Finals (2021 and 2023).

=== League of Legends ===
==== LEC ====
2023

The team entered the LEC in 2023 following a collaboration agreement with Rogue. The entire roster was maintained except in the top lane, where Mathias "Szygenda" Jensen was signed.

In their debut winter split, the team managed to qualify for the playoffs, finishing in 3rd position. In spring the team managed to enter the group stage, finishing in 6th position.

For the summer split, the team signed Henk "Advienne" Reijenga as their new support. They managed to enter the group stage but failed to qualify for the playoffs, finishing in 8th position.

2024

After ending their collaboration with Rogue, KOI remained in the LEC through a new merger with MAD Lions (along with Movistar Riders). The new team became known as MAD Lions KOI (MDK) and announced its new roster for 2024, consisting of four rookies: Álex "Myrwn" Villarejo as top, Bartłomiej "Fresskowy" Przewoźnik as mid, David "Supa" Martínez as bot, and Álvaro "Alvaro" Fernández as support. All of them led by Javier "Elyoya" Prades in the jungle.

In their first split, the team qualified for playoffs with a 5–4 record. After losing to Fnatic 0–2 in the upper bracket, the team went on a winning streak to the split final, beating GIANTX (2–0), Team Vitality (2–0), Fnatic (3–2), and Team BDS (3–2). In the final, they started by winning the first map but ultimately fell 1–3 to G2 Esports.

In the spring they once again made it into the playoffs with a 4–5 record. In the playoffs, they lost to G2 Esports 0–2, dropping to the lower bracket. After defeating GIANTX 2–1, they finally lost to Team Vitality 0–2, being eliminated from the split and failing to qualify for the 2024 Mid-Season Invitational.

In the summer split they miraculously qualified for the playoffs on the last day after beating Rogue in the last regular match and winning two tiebreakers against Rogue and Team Vitality. In playoffs, they lost 1–2 in first round of upper bracket against Team BDS after dominating the series. They were eventually eliminated by Karmine Corp after a disappointing series.

With 200 points accumulated during the season, the team qualified for the Season Finals in 4th place. After defeating G2 Esports 3–2 in the upper bracket semifinals, the team fell to Fnatic 2–3 in the following round. In the lower bracket final, they were ultimately eliminated by G2 Esports, thus qualifying for the 2024 World Championship as the third and final seed. At Worlds, the team advanced to the Swiss stage after winning their first two games in the play-in against Vikings Esports and PSG Talon. In the Swiss stage, the team was eliminated after losing all three of their matches against Bilibili Gaming, PSG Talon and GAM Esports.

2025

The team retained its entire roster except for the mid position. On 6 December 2024, at KOI-Con event, Joseph "Jojopyun" Joon-pyun was announced as new midlaner, becoming the first player imported from North America to Europe. On the same day, it was announced that the team would be renamed Movistar KOI (MKOI) and played a showmatch against Karmine Corp, winning 2–0.

In the winter split, the team qualified for the playoffs with a 6–3 record. In the upper bracket, they beat Team BDS 2–0 and lost 0–2 to Karmine Corp. In the lower bracket, they beat GIANTX 2–0 before finally losing 1–3 to Fnatic, thus finishing in 4th place and failing to qualify 2025 First Stand.

In the spring they qualified for the playoffs again with another 6–3 record. During the regular season, the team hosted the LEC Roadtrip Madrid, which took place at the Madrid Arena on 26–27 April. In the playoffs they beat the reigning champion Karmine Corp twice, the last time being to advance to the split final against G2 Esports and qualifying for the 2025 Mid-Season Invitational and the 2025 Esports World Cup. In the final, the team proved superior throughout and won 3–1, achieving their 4th LEC title (the first under the KOI brand).

At MSI they were quickly eliminated after falling to Bilibili Gaming (1–3) and CTBC Flying Oyster (1–3), finishing in 7th–8th place. In the EWC, the team qualified for the playoffs after beating GAM Esports and their recent MSI executioner, CTBC Flying Oyster. In playoffs the team was eliminated by reigning world champion T1 1–2, finishing in 5th–8th position.

On summer split the team qualify for playoffs in first position in Group 1. In playoffs, after their victory against Fnatic, the team qualified for the 2025 World Championship and the Summer Finals held at the Caja Mágica in Madrid. At the event, they beat Fnatic again to secure a spot in the split final against G2 Esports. In the final, held on 28 September, the team was outplayed and lost 0–3.

At Worlds, they started with losses against KT Rolster and G2 Esports. The team recovered after beating and eliminating Fnatic and Team Secret Whales. They then faced the reigning world champions, T1, for a spot in the quarterfinals, but lost 0–2, finishing in 9th–11th place.

2026

The team retained its full roster and it was announced that it would host three LEC Roadtrips this year.

At the first split of the season, the LEC Versus, the team suffered ups and downs in the regular season but qualified for the playoffs in 6th place with a 6–5 record. In the playoffs, the team comfortably beat Team Vitality (2–0) and Natus Vincere (2–0), securing passage to the Versus Finals at the Olimpic Arena in Badalona, the first of three events hosted by the team. At the event, the team lost 2–3 to Karmine Corp for a place in the final, finishing in 3rd place and failing to qualify for the 2026 First Stand.

In the spring split, the team finished the regular season with a 6–3 record. During the same period, they held their second Roadtrip of the year on the weekend of 8–10 May at the Madrid Arena. In the playoffs, they swept Team Vitality 3–0 and suffered a reverse sweep in a 2–3 loss to G2 Esports for a spot in the split final and qualification for 2026 Mid-Season Invitational. They then faced Karmine Corp in one last chance to qualify both, but ultimately fell in a disappointing series, finishing in 3rd place and qualifying for the 2026 Esports World Cup. At EWC, the team lost to Bilibili Gaming and GAM Esports and was eliminated.

During the summer split, the team performed at an unrecognizable level and managed to qualify for the playoffs thanks to a stroke of luck as the sixth and final qualifier. In the playoffs, they beat Team Vitality to qualify for the Summer Finals in Nice. At the event, they swept Natus Vincere (3–1) and Karmine Corp (3–0), qualifying for the 2026 World Championship and the final of the split against G2 Esports. They were defeated in the final 0–3.

At Worlds, they got off to a great start, beating the eventual champion Bilibili Gaming and CTBC Flying Oyster to begin the tournament 2–0. However, following this strong start, they went on to lose three consecutive matches in their fight for a quarterfinal spot, ultimately getting eliminated and finishing 9th–11th place.

==== LES ====
2022

KOI entered the Superliga after acquiring the place of Astralis SB. On 15 December 2021, at the showmatch against Karmine Corp, they presented their roster composed of: Enzo "SLT" Gonzalez, Luis "Koldo" Pérez, Jørgen "Hatrixx" Elgåen, Rafa "Rafitta" Ayllón and Daniel "seaz" Binderhofer, with Pedro "Plasma" Ribeiro as a substitute. The team won the showmatch 2–1.

The team debuted in the spring split of 2022, finishing in 4th place. For the summer split, the team signed Matti "WhiteKnight" Sormunen and Francisco José "Xico" Cruz in top and mid, respectively. The team finished in 4th position again.

Between October and November they participated in the Iberian Cup, finishing in 3rd–4th place.

2023

With KOI's entry into the LEC, the team was renamed Finetwork KOI (FNK) in 2023. For the spring split, the team was renewed with Jakub "Sinmivak" Rucki, João Miguel "Baca" Novais and Damian "Lucker" Konefał in top, mid and bot. The team failed to qualify for the playoffs.

For summer the bot lane was completely renewed with the entry of Josip "Jopa" Čančar and Paul "Stend" Lardin as bot and support, respectively, moving "Lucker" and "seaz" to substitutes. The team finished in 3rd place.

They reached the final of the Iberian Cup against Los Heretics, played on 10 November. They were defeated 0–3.

2024

In 2024 the team became known as Movistar KOI after the merger with MAD Lions and Movistar Riders. The team was completely revamped for spring: Pedro José "Marky" Serrano as top; Will Antony "NoName" Jones as jungle; Adam "Random" Grepl as mid; Đorđe "Shy Carry" Stišović as bot; and Igor "marlon" Tomczyk as support. The team qualified for the playoffs and finished in 6th place.

In the summer, Magnus "MAXI" Kristensen and Rubén "Rhuckz" Barbosa joined in jungle and support. The team qualified for the playoffs and finished in 5th place.

They finished the season with the Iberian Cup, achieving 5th–8th place.

2025

For 2025, the team changed its name to Movistar KOI Fénix (MKF) and renewed the entire roster with Muhanad "Spooder" Sharad (top), Edgaras "Eckas" Strazdauskas (jungle), Bartłomiej "Fresskowy" Przewoźnik (mid), William "UNF0RGIVEN" Nieminen (bot) and Kamil "kamilius" Košťál (support). The competition included the new winter split, where the team finished in 6th place.

For spring, veteran support Erik "Treatz" Wessén was acquired but finished in 8th place. The team was almost entirely renewed in the summer except in mid with the signings of Ivan "NightSlayer" Bilous in top, Tiago "Time" Almeida in jungle, Zayan "13" Tareau in bot and Tomislav "Thomas" Nanjara as support. They made it back into the playoffs and finished in 4rd place.

During the Iberian Cup in November, they finished 5th–8th place.

2026

The roster remained intact except for the support position, with the addition of Mohamed "Myrtus" Rahli.

On 13 January it was announced that the league would be renamed Liga Española de League of Legends (LES) following the change in production of the Liga de Videojuegos Profesional (LVP) to Lastlap and CABAL esports.

From 13–15 February was held the Kickoff, the first split of the season. The team competed in Group A, where they beat Falke Esports and lost to UCAM Esports for a spot in the semifinals. The following day, they beat the Universidad de Barcelona 2–0, qualifying for the semifinals. In the semifinals, they comfortably beat Team Heretics Academy 2–0. In the final, they again beat Barça eSports 2–0, securing the organization's 6th title (their first as KOI) and qualifying as 1st seed to the EMEA Masters. At the event they were eliminated with a record of 1–2 out of three games, finishing in 9th–12th place.

In the spring split, they qualified for the playoffs with a 6–1 record. In the playoffs they finishing in 3rd place.

For summer split, the team announced Enes "XnS" Hansu as its new jungler. The team finished 1st with a perfect 7–0 record, qualifying for the playoffs. In the playoffs, they defeated Barça eSports 3–0 and beat Team Heretics Academy 3–2 in the final, securing their 2nd league title (7th overall) and qualified for the EMEA Masters and the Final Four. In the Final Four, they beat UCAM Esports 3–1 in the semifinals and Team Heretics Academy 3–2 in the final held at the Madrid Arena, securing their 3rd (8th) title. At EMEA, they finished in 3rd–4th place.

On 13–14 September, they competed in the qualifier for the new 2026 World Star Challengers Invitational beating the Turkish champion Bushido Wildcats and the German champion Berlin International Gaming, respectively, qualifying for the event. At the tournament they qualified for the quarterfinals with a 4–2 record in Group B, which included the academy teams of KT Rolster, Bilibili Gaming and CTBC Flying Oyster. In the quarterfinals, they fell to Solary 1–3, finishing in 5th–8th place.

==== Circuito Tormenta ====
On 23 March 2026, the team's entry into the Circuito Tormenta (CT) was announced under the name Movistar KOI Karps (MKS). The team competes in Division 1 of the Hextech Series.

=== Pokémon Champions ===
2024

On 4 January 2024, the team signed Álex "PokeAlex" Gómez and Eric "Riopaser" Ríos to compete in Pokémon VGC. During the season, both players achieved notable international results. "PokeAlex" finished 3rd–4th at the Europe International, while "Riopaser" achieved a Top 9 finish at the North America International. At the 2024 World Championship in Honolulu, held in August, "Riopaser" finished in the Top 25 and "PokeAlex" in the Top 33, among nearly 700 competitors.

2025

In 2025, "Riopaser" reached the finals of both the Stockholm Regional and Stuttgart Regional, finishing as runner-up on both occasions. He also finished 3rd–4th at the North America International, while "PokeAlex" finished 3rd–4th at the Birmingham Regional. Despite a strong year in terms of results, both players had a disappointing performance at the 2025 World Championship.

On 31 October 2025, KOI renewed both players for the 2026 season.

2026

The 2026 season saw both players continue to achieve strong results on the international stage. "Riopaser" finished 5th–8th at the Europe International and runner-up at the North America International, while "PokeAlex" achieved a Top 9 finish at the Europe International. However, at the 2026 World Championship, as in the previous year, both players were eliminated prematurely from the tournament.

On 27 September 2026, during the new 2026–27 VGC season, "Riopaser" won the Frankfurt Regional with a perfect 17–0 record out of 1,129 players, securing KOI first Pokémon title.

=== Teamfight Tactics ===
On 31 March 2022, KOI announced former LoL player Antonio "Reven" Pino as their TFT player. He achieved a 5th place in the Golden Spatula Cup in July and 29th in the Dragonlands tournament in November.

In 2023 "Reven" competed in the Vegas Open in December, finishing 155th out of 512 players.

After not participating in 2024, "Reven" announced its return on 22 April 2025 with the additions of Ignacio "Dalesom" Cosano, Marc "Safo20" Safont and "Odesza".

On 8 November 2025, "Dalesom" was crowned champion of the Spanish Major, winning the first TFT trophy for the organization. Additionally, "Odesza" and "Safo20" finished in 7th and 10th place, respectively. The following month the team competed in the Paris Open, which took place from 12–14 December. "Safo20" secured 3rd place out of 768 players, while "Odesza", "Reven", and "Dalesom" placed 227th, 338th, and 465th, respectively.

On 11 January 2026, "Reven" won the Shurima Cup and qualifying for the Tactician’s Crown, the World Championship, and becoming the first Spanish player to do so. In the tournament, held from 27–29 March, he finished in 8th place.

On 17 May 2026, the team qualified for 2026 Esports World Cup. At the event, they finished in 9th–12th place.

== Rosters ==
Movistar KOI rosters

League of Legends (LEC)
Handle	Name	Nationality
Elyoya	Prades, Javier	Spain
Jojopyun	Joseph Joon-pyun	Canada
Alvaro	Fernández, Álvaro	Spain

League of Legends (LES)
Handle	Name	Nationality
NightSlayer	Bilous, Ivan	Ukraine
XnS	Hansu, Enes	Turkey
Fresskowy	Przewoźnik, Bartłomiej	Poland

League of Legends (CT)
Handle	Name	Nationality
Patan	–	Serbia
dylux	Dylak, Filip	Poland
R0BIN	–	Bulgaria
Nae	Martí, Néstor	Spain
Bf	Martín, Mario	Spain

Pokémon Champions
Handle	Name	Nationality
PokeAlex	Gómez, Álex	Spain
Riopaser	Ríos, Eric	Spain

Teamfight Tactics
Handle	Name	Nationality
Reven	Pino, Antonio	Spain
Dalesom	Cosano, Ignacio	Spain
Safo20	Safont, Marc	Spain
Odesza	–	Spain

Legend:
- (I) Inactive
- (S) Suspended
- (L) On loan
- (2W) Two-way player
- Substitute
- (injured) Injury / Illness

== Former divisions ==
=== Apex Legends ===
On 24 April 2025, KOI entered Apex Legends by signing the Oblivion roster, consisting of Miguel "Blinkzr" Quiles, Firdaws "yJely" Abadi, and Brandon "FunFPS" Groombridge.

In May, the team competed in the Global Series, finishing in 93rd place. They later qualified for the 2025 Esports World Cup as part of the Global Series Midseason, where they placed 35th.

The team was eventually disbanded on 18 July.

=== Call of Duty: Warzone ===
On 14 April 2025, the team announced its roster: Emiliano "Clamp" Ramírez, Joseph "Vxlcom" Arcos and Joel "Netodz" Tello. They qualified in 1st place in the LATAM North qualifier for the 2025 Esports World Cup. The team finished in 16th place at the EWC held in August.

In October they participated in the World Series, finishing in 47th position. On the 6th of the same month, the team was disbanded.

=== Counter-Strike 2 ===
Following the merger in January 2024, the team inherited the Movistar Riders roster. The team was at the PGL Major Copenhagen 2024, where they finished in 23rd–24th position. In September they competed in the ESL Pro League Season 20, finishing in 29th–32nd position.

On 7 January 2025 the team was dissolved.

=== FIFA / EA Sports FC ===
KOI announced the signings of Jacobo "Chousita" Chousa and José "Jotaba" González on 3 October 2022 as its FIFA 23 players. The team competed in eLaLiga 2023 in association with FC Andorra.

Following the merger with Movistar Riders (and MAD Lions) on 4 January 2024, the team inherited players Andoni "Andonii" Payo and Valentín "Lavinten" Bandeo to compete in EA Sports FC 24 in association with Atlético Madrid. On the same day, the departure of "Chousita" was announced, followed by that of "Jotaba" on 9 February.

For the 2025 season, "Andonii" and "Lavinten" were retained to compete in EA Sports FC 25, maintaining their association with Atlético Madrid. On 21 October, "Andonii" departure was announced after more than eight years with the organization.

=== Free Fire ===
KOI entered the World Series LATAM on 26 February 2025, announcing its roster on 12 March. Between April and June, the team competed in the Latin America qualifier for the 2025 Esports World Cup. However, they were unable to advance and finished in 7th place.

The roster was dissolved on 26 November, and the new roster for 2026 was subsequently announced on 10 December. This new roster competed again in the qualifier for the 2026 Esports World Cup, finishing in 7th place and failing to qualify.

=== Honor of Kings ===
On 31 March 2025, the team announced its entry, announcing their roster on 17 April. The team competed in the Major West League (KMW) in spring, finishing in 5th position and failing to qualify for the 2025 Esports World Cup.

=== League of Legends ===
On 31 May 2023, a women's team was created under the name of KOI Amethyst. This team competed in the Equal eSports Cup and was dissolved on 4 October.

Following the merger with MAD Lions (and Movistar Riders) on 4 January 2024, the team returned with a women's team under the name MAD Lions KOI Femenino. The team competed again in the Equal eSports Cup and was finally disbanded on 16 September.

=== Rainbow Six Siege ===
With the new collaboration with Rogue, KOI inherited its roster on 16 December 2022. The team achieved 5th–6th position at the Six Invitational 2023 in February. The team was finally disbanded on 19 November.

=== Rocket League ===
With the collaboration agreement with Rogue in October 2022, the team inherited their roster. The team disbanded in November 2023.

On 24 April 2025, KOI returned to Rocket League by signing Óscar "tehqoz" Arco, Maarten "Oscillon" van Zee and Thomas "ThO." Binkhors. The roster failed to qualify for the 2025 Esports World Cup and it dissolved in 10 June.

=== Valorant ===
==== VCT ====
2023

On 21 September 2022, it was announced as a partner team with a four-year contract. On 16 December they announced their new roster for 2023: José Luis "koldamenta" Aranguren, Bogdan "Sheydos" Naumov, Nikita "trexx" Cherednichenko, and Berkant "Wolfen" Joshkun. The fifth and final member, Patryk "starxo" Kopczyński, was announced on 4 January 2023.

At the first international event, LOCK//IN São Paulo, held between February and March, the team was eliminated by NRG Esports. Shortly after, in the league phase held between 27 March–28 May, they finished in 9th place, missing out on the playoffs.

From 19–23 July, they competed in the Last Chance Qualifier. After beating Team Heretics (2–1) and Natus Vincere (2–0), they lost to Giants (0–2) for a spot in the final. They faced Natus Vincere again for a place in the final, losing once more and finishing in 3rd place, thus missing out on the 2023 Champions.

On 27 October, the additions of Tobias "ShadoW" Flodström, Kamil "kamo" Frąckowiak, and Bartosz "UNFAKE" Bernacki were announced. They subsequently competed in the Crossfire Cup in November, finishing in 5th–8th place.

2024

Following the merger with Movistar Riders and MAD Lions on 4 January 2024, the team began competing as Movistar KOI. On 9 February, they announced the roster consisting of "Sheydos", "starxo", "ShadoW", "kamo", and their recent signing, Grzegorz "GRUBINHO" Ryczko.

Between 20 February and 1 March, at the Kickoff qualifying for the Masters Madrid, the team qualified for the play-in by finishing 2nd in Group B. In the play-in, they lost to Team Vitality and Karmine Corp, failing to qualify for the playoffs and finishing in 6th place.

In Stage 1 (April–May) and Stage 2 (June–July), the team finished last (11th), thus ending the year having played only 15 games in total (including the Kickoff).

Following the departures of "starxo" and "kamo" in September and October, respectively, along with "ShadoW" going inactive, the team announced the signings of Dom "soulcas" Sulcas, Dawid "Filu" Czarnecki, and Xavier "flyuh" Carlson on 7 November. Two days later the roster debuted (along with "Sheydos" and "GRUBINHO") at the KCX4: Forever Rivals event organized by Karmine Corp.

2025

At the Kickoff, the team lost to Team Liquid and Gentle Mates, which led to their elimination and a 9th–12th place finish.

Between March and May, they competed in Stage 1. The team finished 5th in the Group Omega and failed to qualify for the playoffs, ending in 9th–10th place.

On 15 May, the departure of "GRUBINHO" was announced, along with the additions of Kamil "baddyG" Graniczka, Nathan "nataNk" Bocqueho, and Ondřej "MONSTEERR" Petrů (promoted from the academy), while "Sheydos" and "soulcas" were moved to inactive status. The next day they competed in the qualifier for the 2025 Esports World Cup, being eliminated after losing their only two games.

In Stage 2 (July–August), they were eliminated from the playoffs again after winning only one game against Apeks and finishing in 9th–10th place, thus ending the season.

On 6 September, co-founder Ibai Llanos announced in a video that Riot Games had expelled the team from the competition. According to Llanos, the decision was unexpected, as the organization was already planning for the following season. He explained that the possible reasons included the team's poor performance, low skin sales, and a lack of content. Llanos also expressed his personal opinion that the expulsion was related to Gentle Mates, a recently relegated team, taking the vacant spot, which ultimately occurred on 7 October.

==== Game Changers ====
Following the merger with MAD Lions (and Movistar Riders) on 4 January 2024, KOI inherited its roster and went on to compete as MAD Lions KOI (MDK). The roster retained Alessia "Alessia" Crisafo, Leyre "Leyre" Cebollada, and Nicole "Nidxvilco" Dobrovolskyy, with the additions of "mads" and Monika "KXoma" Čížová. The team qualified for VCT: Game Changers on 4 February after beat NYAN Esports 2–0.

The team competed in Stage 1, finishing in 9th place and being relegated to the Contender Series. On 3 March, "KXoma" left the team, and Lidia "didii" del Moral joined on 26 March. Four days later, Contender Series 1 began, where the team narrowly missed qualification for Stage 2 after losing 1–2 to Odd 1 OUT and finishing in 4th place.

With "mads" retiring on 25 April and "Leyre" leaving the team on 9 May, "Tara" and "Lil Bob" were announced as their replacements on 19 May. The team subsequently competed in Our Party Split 2, a qualifier for Contender Series 2, where they finished in 1st place.

In Contender Series 2, held in July, the team finished in 5th–6th place and failed to qualify for Stage 3. On 5 August, the departure of "Tara" was announced, and "ikyoo" was revealed as her replacement on 7 September.

On 9 November, the team won a showmatch against Karmine Corp at the KCX4: Forever Rivals event, with Paula "devilasxa" Blanco replacing "didii". The team was disbanded later that month, on the 28th.

==== Rising ====
2022

KOI announced their entry on 5 January 2022 with their roster consisting of Joona "H1ber" Parviainen, Oskar "PHYRN" Palmqvist, Ladislav "Sacake" Sachr, Gabriel "shrew" Gessle, and Gabriel "starkk" Marques, with Gerard "ThoR" Vicente as a substitute.

In Stage 1, the team finished third in the regular season with a 6–3 record. In the playoffs, the team lost to Rebels Gaming 2–3, finishing in 3rd place. Later, "H1ber" was loaned to Fnatic.

From May to July they competed in Stage 2–during this time Ramses "Famsii" Koivukangas, Alberto "neptuNo" González and Martin "MAGNUM" Peňkov joined, moving "starkk" and "shrew" to inactive–. The team finished in 9th place, playing for a spot in Split 1 in 2023 against Herbalife Real Betis. The team won 3–1.

In the Crossfire Cup held between October and November, the team finished in 3rd–4th place.

With the entry into VCT in 2023, the roster was dissolved on 31 December.

2025

On 2 January 2025, their return to competition was announced as Movistar KOI Fénix (MKF) with a roster consisting of: Antonio "Guardy" Guardiola, Ondřej "MONSTEERR" Petrů, Diogo "OLIZERA" Oliveira, Niklas "pika" Holze, and Zachary "ZachKappa" Neal.

In Stage 1 they qualified for the playoffs in 4th place. In the playoffs they lost against HGE Esports for a spot in the final, finishing in 3rd–4th place.

In Stage 2, between March and April, they qualified for the playoffs in 2nd place. In the playoffs, they beat DNSTY 3–2 in the semifinals. In the final, they beat UCAM Esports 3–0, achieving the organization's first Rising (and Valorant) title.

On 15 May "MONSTEERR" was promoted to VCT's main roster, and the team signed Michail "globeX" Kostylew as his replacement on the 19th. That same day, Stage 2 of Challengers EMEA began. They qualified for the playoffs as the top team in Group A. In the playoffs, they lost in the first round of the upper bracket against BBL PCIFIC 0–2. In the lower bracket, they beat FOKUS 2–0 before finally losing to Enterprise Esports 1–3, finishing in 3rd place.

Two weeks before Stage 3 began, the departure of "OLIZERA" and the arrival of Dawid "demek" Madrak were announced. In the tournament they ended up qualifying for the playoffs in 1st place in Group A. In the playoffs they comfortably beat Barça eSports 2–0 in the semifinals and Ramboot Club 3–1 in the final, achieving their second consecutive title.

In August they competed in the Final Four, where they qualified as the top team with 1875 points. After beat Ramboot Club 3–0, they played the final against DNSTY in San Javier. After a hard-fought final, they ended up losing 2–3.

Their last tournament was Stage 3 of the Challengers EMEA held in September where they finished last in Group C and ended up in 13th–14th place. The team's disbandment was announced on the 30th.

== Content creators ==
The following is a list of content creators currently signed to Movistar KOI:

ID	Name	Nationality	Joined
Ander	Ander Cortés	Spain	2021
Black	Alejandro García	Spain	2024
Karchez	José Carlos Sánchez	Spain	2021
Knekro	Sergio García	Spain	2021
Kuentin	Alejandro Cotrina	Spain	2024
Mellado	Jaime Mellado	Spain	2025
Pandarina	Marina Sánchez	Spain	2021
PauSenpai	Paula Gómez	Spain	2023
Perxitaa	Jaume Cremades	Spain	2024
Reven	Antonio Pino	Spain	2022
Rodenasink	Marta Ródenas	Spain	2025
Suja	Pol Domínguez	Spain	2024
Theakaleina	Eli	Russia / Spain	2025
Wolk	Víctor Fernández	Spain	2026

== Organization ==
=== Facilities ===
In Spain, it is headquartered at the Movistar eSports Center (MEC) in Madrid and has offices for co-streaming in Sant Cugat del Vallès, near Barcelona. It also has offices in Berlin (Germany).

=== Identity and culture ===
The club is named after the Koi carp, drawing inspiration from the traditional legend of the koi fish swimming upstream and climbing waterfalls to overcome adversity. According to the myth, a carp that successfully scales the crest of the Dragon's Gate is rewarded by the gods and transformed into a powerful dragon.

As a result of this imagery, which represents perseverance, resilience, and ultimate success, the team and its players are colloquially nicknamed "Las Carpas" (The Carps) by esports media and the community.

== Philanthropy ==
On 13 December 2025, KOInéfico, a charity livestream held to raise funds for Doctors of the World, raised a total of €18,000.
