= Canna (gamer) =

Korean esport player (born 2000)

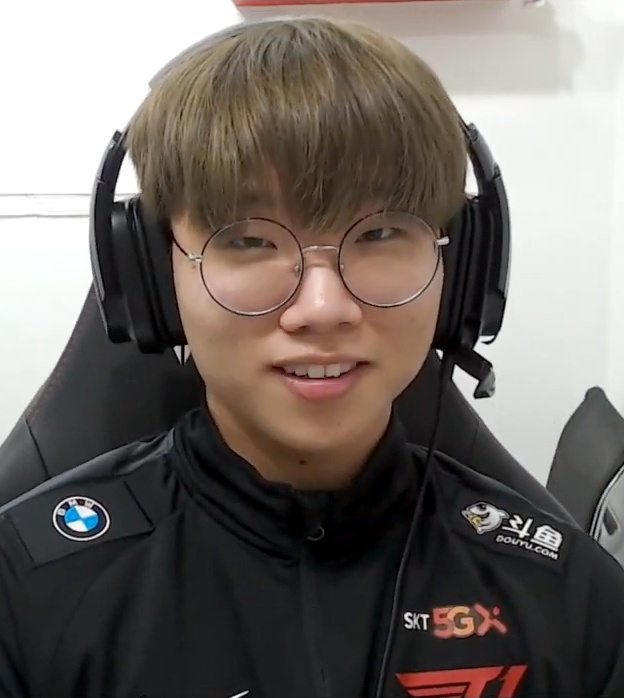
- Kim in 2020

Personal information
- Name: 김창동 (Kim Chang-dong)
- Born: 11 February 2000 (age 26); Andong, South Korea
- Nationality: South Korean

Current team
- Team: Karmine Corp
- Role: Top laner
- Game: League of Legends
- League: LEC

Team history
- 2020–2021: T1
- 2022: Nongshim RedForce
- 2023: Dplus KIA (Note: Known as DWG KIA from January 2021 to January 2023.)
- 2024–present: Karmine Corp

Career highlights and awards
- LCK champion; LEC champion; 2× LEC 1st All-Pro Team

Kim Chang-dong (Korean: 김창동), better known as Canna (Korean: 칸나), is a South Korean professional League of Legends player for Karmine Corp. He made his debut during KeSPA Cup 2019.

He was a trainee of T1 before being promoted to the team.

== Early life ==
His role model is Khan.

His in-game name was based on his favourite anime character, Kanna Kamui, from Miss Kobayashi's Dragon Maid.

== Career ==
=== Season 9 ===
During his time as trainee, he and four other trainees from T1, Ellim, Mask, Gumayusi and Kuri, competed in the 2019 LoL Amateur Tournament. The team was called 'T1 rookies', and they won the tournament.

On November 26, 2019, T1 announced that Canna would be joining as part of the roster. His first game after the announcement was against Gen.G during KeSPA Cup 2019, and his first champion used was Aatrox, which he won.

=== Season 10 ===
He played his first LCK game on February 7, 2020, against Hanwha Life Esports. He and his team finished the split in second place, which qualified them to the second round of playoffs.

On April 25, 2020, he and his team won the LCK Spring finals. This was his first LCK title, which made him a 'Royal Roader (Note: A Korean term given to the rookies that win the championship in their first year..)'.

=== Season 11 ===
He was included in the roster for 2021 League of Legends World Championship.

On November 25, 2021, he was transferred to Nongshim RedForce before the 2022 Spring Split.

== Seasons overview ==
Year	Team	Domestic						International		
Year	Team	League	Split					First Stand	Mid-Season Invitational	World Championship
Year	Team	League	Versus	Winter	Spring	Summer	Season Finals	First Stand	Mid-Season Invitational	World Championship
2020	T1	LCK	—N/a	—N/a	1st	5th	—N/a	—N/a	None held (Note: Cancelled due to the COVID-19 pandemic.)	Did not qualify
2021	T1	LCK	—N/a	—N/a	4th	2nd	—N/a	—N/a	Did not qualify	3rd–4th
2022	Nongshim RedForce	LCK	—N/a	—N/a	8th	8th	—N/a	—N/a	Did not qualify	Did not qualify
2023	Dplus KIA	LCK	—N/a	—N/a	5th	5th	—N/a	—N/a	Did not qualify	9th–11th
2024	Karmine Corp	LEC	—N/a	—	—	4th	Did not qualify	—N/a	—	Did not qualify
2025	Karmine Corp	LEC	—N/a	1st	3rd	4th	—N/a	2nd	Did not qualify	Did not qualify
2026	Karmine Corp	LEC	2nd	—N/a	2nd	3rd	—N/a	Did not qualify	10th	5th–8th

== Awards and honors ==
LCK

- One-time LCK champion – Spring 2020
- One-time LCK 2nd All-Pro Team – Summer 2020

LEC

- One-time LEC champion – Winter 2025
- Two-time LEC 1st All-Pro Team – Spring 2025, Summer 2026
- One-time LEC 2nd All-Pro Team – Spring 2026
