= League of Legends EMEA Championship =

Professional League of Legends esports league

- Current season, competition or edition: 2026 LEC season
- Formerly: European League of Legends Championship Series (2013–2018); League of Legends European Championship (2019–2022)
- Game: League of Legends
- Founded: 6 August 2012; 14 years ago
- First season: 2013
- Owner: Riot Games
- Commissioner: Artem Bykov
- No. of teams: 10
- Region: EMEA
- Venues: Riot Games Arena, Adlershof, Berlin, Germany
- Most recent champion: G2 Esports (20th title) (Summer 2026)
- Most titles: G2 Esports (20 titles)
- Qualification: Franchise partnership
- International cups: First Stand Tournament; Mid-Season Invitational; World Championship
- Related competitions: CBLOL, LCK, LCP, LCS, LPL
- Website: www.lolesports.com

The League of Legends EMEA Championship (LEC) is the professional League of Legends esports league run by Riot Games in the EMEA (Europe, the Middle East and Africa) region, in which ten teams compete. Each annual season is divided into three splits: Winter, Spring and Summer. At the end of the season, the top performing teams qualify for various international events: the First Stand Tournament by winning the LEC Versus tournament, the Mid-Season Invitational (MSI) for the top two teams of the Spring Split, the League of Legends World Championship for the top three teams of Summer Split. The LEC represents the highest level of League of Legends play in the EMEA region.

With the exception of some touring events, all games of the LEC are played live at the Riot Games Arena in Adlershof, Berlin, Germany. In addition to a small studio audience, all games are streamed live in several languages on Twitch and YouTube, with broadcasts regularly attracting over 300,000 viewers.

The popularity and success of the LEC has attracted significant media attention. On 30 September 2016, the French Senate unanimously adopted the last version of the Law for a Digital Republic, significantly improving the visa process for LEC players and esports athletes in general, giving a legal framework to esports contracts, introducing mechanisms to ensure payment of cash prizes, specifying rights for minor esport athletes, and more. A few months before, France also introduced a new esports federation, "France Esports", which has the duty to be a representative body of esports towards the government and serve as a "partner of the French National Olympic and Sports Committee for all matters relating to the recognition of electronic sports as sport in itself". Spain did the same in November 2016, creating the Spanish Federation of Video Games and Esports. The LEC has attracted sponsorships from LG UltraGear, Kia, Red Bull, and Erste Group.

Fnatic is the only team remaining that has played in every split since the inaugural 2013 Spring Split. G2 Esports is the team with the most champion titles, with 20 in total.

== Previous names ==
- 2013–2018: European League of Legends Championship Series (EU LCS)
- 2019–2022: League of Legends European Championship (LEC)
- 2023–present: League of Legends EMEA Championship (LEC)

== History ==
Riot Games launched League of Legends in October 2009 and attracted attention from the competitive gaming community. The first two seasons of competitive play consisted of a series of tournaments mostly organised by third parties, such as Intel Extreme Masters in Europe, capped by a world championship tournament hosted by Riot Games.

Riot Games announced the formation of the LCS on 6 August 2012, creating a fully professional league run by the company with a regular schedule and guaranteed salaries for players, featuring eight teams. Since the LCS was only launched in the third year of professional play, it was dubbed "Season 3". The top three finishers in the Riot Games European regional championships held in August 2012 automatically qualified, with the remaining five teams being decided in qualifier tournaments held in January 2013. Each LCS season is divided into two splits for spring and summer; the first games of the first spring split took place on 7 February 2013 in North America and on 9 February 2013 in Europe.

Season 3 of the LCS finished with the top three finishers Fnatic, Lemondogs, and Gambit Gaming. The top three teams advanced to the Season 3 World Championships.

Riot Games changed naming conventions in 2014, calling the season the "2014 Season" instead of "Season 4". The League of Legends Challenger Series was created as a second tier of competition for promotion and relegation.

At the end of the 2014 season, an expansion tournament was held in Europe that added two teams in region, giving the LCS a total of 10 teams for the start of the 2015 Season. Additionally, Riot introduced the concept of "Championship points", which teams would earn based on performance across both splits and playoffs in order to qualify for the League of Legends World Championship.

A new sale of sponsorship rule was instated for the 2015 season. As a result, several teams were forced to rebrand and leave their respective parent organisations.

The 2015 Summer European LCS Finals were played at Hovet Arena, Stockholm. The series ended with Fnatic winning 3–2 over Origen and peaked at close to 1 million concurrent viewers on Twitch, YouTube, and Azubu – the highest number of viewers for any LCS match to date.

The 2016 Spring European LCS finals were held at Rotterdam Ahoy in Rotterdam, with G2 winning 3–1 against Origen, making it their first LCS title. The 2016 Spring European LCS split was the first time G2 played in the professional LCS after having been promoted due to winning the European Challenger Series and European Promotion Tournament in summer 2016.

The 2016 Summer European LCS finals were played at the Tauron Arena in Kraków, Poland. G2 won 3–1 against Splyce and secured their second LCS title. Splyce would later win the 2016 Summer European Gauntlet and qualify for Worlds as the third-seeded European team.

The 2017 Spring European LCS finals were held at the Barclaycard Arena in Hamburg, Germany, where G2 won 3–1 against Unicorns of Love, securing their third LCS title and qualifying for the Mid-Season Invitational (MSI), an annually-held international League of Legends competition. G2 placed second at the MSI 2017, losing 1–3 to SKT T1, the Korean representatives, in the finals. The Summer Split LCS finals took place in Paris at the AccorHotel Arena, where G2 Esports won 3–0 against Misfits Gaming.

In 2019 the league rebranded from the "Europe League Championship Series" (EU LCS) to the "League of Legends European Championship" (LEC) and began franchising. Following the example of North America's LCS, which franchised a year prior, the LEC selected ten permanent franchise partners, replacing the previous promotion and relegation format. The EU LCS' secondary league, the EU Challenger Series (EUCS), was consequently discontinued and replaced with an independent tournament named European Masters, which features the top teams from Europe's many regional leagues.

In 2020, the league announced via their public Twitter account a partnership with a proposed Saudi Arabian city, Neom. Following major community backlash over the human rights abuses in the country, including criminalization of LGBT people, the partnership was called off the next day. Another two days later, the league's Director of Esports EMEA, Alberto Guerrero, put out a statement apologizing to the community for the partnership decision, with emphasis on apologizing to 'women, LGBTQIA+ individuals, and League of Legends players in the Middle East'.

Since 2023, the European region, alongside Turkey, the CIS and MENA, have been merged into the combined EMEA (Europe, the Middle East and Africa) region. The "League of Legends European Championship" became the "League of Legends EMEA Championship", meaning teams from Turkey and the CIS's leagues (TCL, LCL) no longer get direct slots for the Mid-Season Invitational and the World Championship. TCL teams now qualify for EMEA Masters, while as of 2026 the LCL has yet to return in any capacity due to the Russo-Ukrainian war.

== Trophy ==
The LEC Trophy was designed by DesignStudio and manufactured by English silverware company, Thomas Lyte. The design was inspired by the format of the tournament and its ten competing teams. Each team is represented by an individual column which cascades in a spiralling motion until one column rises to the top, and is named LEC Champion. The trophy was made in 2019, and stands at 1m in height.

== Current format ==
Since the rebrand of the league in 2023, 10 teams, selected through franchising, compete in the LEC. Each season is divided into three splits. Each split varies in format, but the top teams in each split qualify for the three international League of Legends events – First Stand for Winter, the Mid-Season Invitational for Spring, and the World Championship for Summer.

In 2023 and 2024, the three splits offered Championship Points to teams, with these points determining teams that qualified for a season-ending event known as the Season Finals. This was a double elimination, with the top 4 seeds qualifying for the upper bracket.

=== Overview (2025) ===
==== Winter Split ====
===== Stage 1 =====
- 10 teams
- Single round-robin, best of one
- Top 8 teams advance to Stage 2

===== Stage 2 =====
- 8 teams
- Double elimination, best of three for the first two rounds of the upper and lower bracket, best of five from then on
  - All matches in this stage utilize Fearless Draft, where picked Champions can't be played in future games within the series
- The winner of Stage 2 qualifies for the First Stand Tournament

==== Spring Split ====
===== Stage 1 =====
- 10 teams
- Single round-robin, best of three
- Top 6 teams advance to Stage 2

===== Stage 2 =====
- 6 teams
- Double elimination, best of five
- The winner and runner-up qualify for the Mid-Season Invitational

==== Summer Split ====
===== Stage 1 =====
- 10 teams, split into 2 groups of 5
- Single round-robin, best of three
- Top 2 teams in each group advance to Stage 2
- Third and fourth place in each group enter play-in for final two spots in Stage 2

===== Stage 2 =====
- 6 teams
- Double elimination, best of five
  - Top 2 teams in each group from Stage 1 placed in upper bracket, play-in winners placed in lower bracket
- The winner, runner-up and third place teams qualify for the World Championship
  - If the LEC earns an additional seed from the MSI, the fourth-place team would be seed 4

== Teams ==
Team	Debut	Roster					Head coach
Team	Debut	Top	Jungle	Mid	Bot	Support	Head coach
Fnatic	Spring 2013	Soboro	Razork	Vladi	Upset	Lospa	GrabbZ
G2 Esports	Spring 2016	BrokenBlade	SkewMond	Caps	Hans Sama	Labrov	Perkz
GIANTX	Spring 2019 (Note: Team had competed as Excel Esports before. On 14 December 2023, Excel Esports and Giants Gaming announced merger, forming GIANTX. Giants Gaming had been competing in EU LCS from 2013 to 2018.)	Oscarinin	ISMA	Jackies	Flakked	Jun	Guilhoto
Karmine Corp	Winter 2024 (Note: Karmine Corp acquired their LEC spot from Astralis in October 2023.)	Canna	Yike	kyeahoo	Caliste	Busio	Reapered
Movistar KOI	Spring 2016 (Note: Team had competed as Splyce (2016–2019) and MAD Lions (2020–2023) before. In January 2024, MAD Lions merged with KOI (and Movistar Riders), forming Movistar KOI. During 2024 they competed as MAD Lions KOI.)	Myrwn	Elyoya	Jojopyun	Supa	Alvaro	Melzhet
Natus Vincere	Summer 2025 (Note: Natus Vincere acquired their LEC spot and roster from Rogue on June 13, 2025.)	Maynter	Rhilech	Poby	SamD	Parus	TheRock
Shifters	Spring 2022 (Note: Team BDS acquired their LEC spot from Schalke 04 Esports in June 2021. Team BDS rebranded to Shifters on 15 December 2025.)	Rooster	Sheo	nuc	Paduck	Stend	Striker
SK Gaming	Spring 2013	Wunder	Skeanz	SlowQ	Jopa	Mikyx	OWN3R
Team Heretics	Winter 2023 (Note: Team Heretics acquired their LEC spot from Misfits Gaming in July 2022.)	Tracyn	Daglas	Serin	Hype	Way	Nukeduck
Team Vitality	Spring 2016 (Note: Team Vitality acquired their LEC spot from Gambit Esports in December 2015.)	Naak Nako	Lyncas	FIESTA	Carzzy	Fleshy	Pad

== Media coverage ==
The LEC primarily reaches its viewers through online streaming using its own channels on Twitch and YouTube. On Twitch alone, viewership numbers regularly exceed 200,000 for regular season play, and the games have drawn over 1.7 million unique visitors. In Spring 2020, the LEC reached an average minute audience of over 220,000. with the Spring Finals peaking at over 817,000 consecutive viewers. However, Riot Games CEO Brandon Beck stated in 2012 that there were no immediate plans to try to bring the LCS to traditional TV, but news coverage of the regular season isn't generally limited to dedicated electronic sports news sites, such as CBS Interactive's onGamers.

The scale and popularity of the LEC itself, however, has attracted considerable media attention, particularly around some events that legitimised the LEC as a serious competition.

== Results ==
=== By season ===
Year	Split	Champion	Runner-up	Third	Fourth	Qualified for World Championship			
Year	Split	Champion	Runner-up	Third	Fourth	Seed 1	Seed 2	Seed 3	Seed 4
EU LCS
2013	Spring	Fnatic	Gambit Gaming	Evil Geniuses	SK Gaming	Fnatic	Lemondogs	Gambit Gaming	—N/a
2013	Summer	Fnatic	Lemondogs	Gambit Gaming	Evil Geniuses	Fnatic	Lemondogs	Gambit Gaming	—N/a
2014	Spring	Fnatic	SK Gaming	Team ROCCAT	Alliance	Alliance	Fnatic	SK Gaming	—N/a
2014	Summer	Alliance	Fnatic	SK Gaming	Team ROCCAT	Alliance	Fnatic	SK Gaming	—N/a
2015	Spring	Fnatic	Unicorns of Love	H2k-Gaming	SK Gaming	Fnatic	H2k-Gaming	Origen	—N/a
2015	Summer	Fnatic	Origen	H2k-Gaming	Unicorns of Love	Fnatic	H2k-Gaming	Origen	—N/a
2016	Spring	G2 Esports	Origen	Fnatic	H2k-Gaming	G2 Esports	H2k-Gaming	Splyce	—N/a
2016	Summer	G2 Esports	Splyce	H2k-Gaming	Unicorns of Love	G2 Esports	H2k-Gaming	Splyce	—N/a
2017	Spring	G2 Esports	Unicorns of Love	Fnatic	Misfits Gaming	G2 Esports	Misfits Gaming	Fnatic	—N/a
2017	Summer	G2 Esports	Misfits Gaming	Fnatic	H2k-Gaming	G2 Esports	Misfits Gaming	Fnatic	—N/a
2018	Spring	Fnatic	G2 Esports	Splyce	Team Vitality	Fnatic	Team Vitality	G2 Esports	—N/a
2018	Summer	Fnatic	Schalke 04 Esports	Team Vitality	Misfits Gaming	Fnatic	Team Vitality	G2 Esports	—N/a
LEC
2019	Spring	G2 Esports	Origen	Fnatic	Splyce	G2 Esports	Fnatic	Splyce	—N/a
2019	Summer	G2 Esports	Fnatic	Schalke 04 Esports	Rogue	G2 Esports	Fnatic	Splyce	—N/a
2020	Spring	G2 Esports	Fnatic	MAD Lions	Origen	G2 Esports	Fnatic	Rogue	MAD Lions
2020	Summer	G2 Esports	Fnatic	Rogue	MAD Lions	G2 Esports	Fnatic	Rogue	MAD Lions
2021	Spring	MAD Lions	Rogue	G2 Esports	Schalke 04 Esports	MAD Lions	Fnatic	Rogue	—N/a
2021	Summer	MAD Lions	Fnatic	Rogue	G2 Esports	MAD Lions	Fnatic	Rogue	—N/a
2022	Spring	G2 Esports	Rogue	Fnatic	Misfits Gaming	Rogue	G2 Esports	Fnatic	MAD Lions
2022	Summer	Rogue	G2 Esports	Fnatic	MAD Lions	Rogue	G2 Esports	Fnatic	MAD Lions
2023	Winter	G2 Esports	MAD Lions	KOI	SK Gaming	G2 Esports	Fnatic	MAD Lions	Team BDS
2023	Spring	MAD Lions	Team BDS	Team Vitality	G2 Esports	G2 Esports	Fnatic	MAD Lions	Team BDS
2023	Summer	G2 Esports	Excel Esports	Fnatic	Team Heretics	G2 Esports	Fnatic	MAD Lions	Team BDS
2023	Season Finals	G2 Esports	Fnatic	MAD Lions	Team BDS	G2 Esports	Fnatic	MAD Lions	Team BDS
2024	Winter	G2 Esports	MAD Lions KOI	Team BDS	Fnatic	G2 Esports	Fnatic	MAD Lions KOI	—N/a
2024	Spring	G2 Esports	Fnatic	Team BDS	Team Vitality	G2 Esports	Fnatic	MAD Lions KOI	—N/a
2024	Summer	G2 Esports	Fnatic	Team BDS	Karmine Corp	G2 Esports	Fnatic	MAD Lions KOI	—N/a
2024	Season Finals	G2 Esports	Fnatic	MAD Lions KOI	Team BDS	G2 Esports	Fnatic	MAD Lions KOI	—N/a
2025	Winter	Karmine Corp	G2 Esports	Fnatic	Movistar KOI	G2 Esports	Movistar KOI	Fnatic	—N/a
2025	Spring	Movistar KOI	G2 Esports	Karmine Corp	Fnatic	G2 Esports	Movistar KOI	Fnatic	—N/a
2025	Summer	G2 Esports	Movistar KOI	Fnatic	Karmine Corp	G2 Esports	Movistar KOI	Fnatic	—N/a
2026	Versus	G2 Esports	Karmine Corp	Movistar KOI	GIANTX	G2 Esports	Movistar KOI	Karmine Corp	—N/a
2026	Spring	G2 Esports	Karmine Corp	Movistar KOI	GIANTX	G2 Esports	Movistar KOI	Karmine Corp	—N/a
2026	Summer	G2 Esports	Movistar KOI	Karmine Corp	Natus Vincere	G2 Esports	Movistar KOI	Karmine Corp	—N/a

=== By team ===
Teams in italics indicate teams that have been disbanded or no longer participates in the league.

Team	Title(s)	Runners-up	Seasons won	Seasons runner-up
G2 Esports	20	4	2016 Spring, 2016 Summer, 2017 Spring, 2017 Summer, 2019 Spring, 2019 Summer, 2020 Spring, 2020 Summer, 2022 Spring, 2023 Winter, 2023 Summer, 2023 Season Finals, 2024 Winter, 2024 Spring, 2024 Summer, 2024 Season Finals, 2025 Summer, 2026 Versus, 2026 Spring, 2026 Summer	2018 Spring, 2022 Summer, 2025 Winter, 2025 Spring
Fnatic	7	9	2013 Spring, 2013 Summer, 2014 Spring, 2015 Spring, 2015 Summer, 2018 Spring, 2018 Summer	2014 Summer, 2019 Summer, 2020 Spring, 2020 Summer, 2021 Summer, 2023 Season Finals, 2024 Spring, 2024 Summer, 2024 Season Finals
Movistar KOI	4	5	2021 Spring, 2021 Summer, 2023 Spring, 2025 Spring	2016 Summer, 2023 Winter, 2024 Winter, 2025 Summer, 2026 Summer
Rogue (Note: On October 6, 2022, Rogue announced a merger with KOI. This will result in the existing Rogue teams rebranding to KOI. Following Infinite Reality's split with KOI in 2023, the team was reestablished.)	1	2	2022 Summer	2021 Spring, 2022 Spring
Karmine Corp	1	2	2025 Winter	2026 Versus, 2026 Spring
Alliance (Note: On January 8, 2015, was rebranded as Elements. The team competed under that name until 16 May 2016, when it was dissolved and sold their LCS seed and roster to Schalke 04 Esports.)	1	0	2014 Summer	
Origen (Note: On September 15, 2020, Origen merged with Astralis. The team competing under that name from 2021 to 2023.)	0	3		2015 Summer, 2016 Spring, 2019 Spring
Unicorns of Love	0	2		2015 Spring, 2017 Spring
Gambit Gaming	0	1		2013 Spring
Lemondogs	0	1		2013 Summer
SK Gaming	0	1		2014 Spring
Misfits Gaming	0	1		2017 Summer
Schalke 04 Esports	0	1		2018 Summer
Shifters (Note: Formerly known as Team BDS until December 15, 2025.)	0	1		2023 Spring
GIANTX	0	1		2023 Summer
