= 2022 LEC season =

- League: LEC
- Sport: League of Legends
- Duration: January 15 – March 7 (Spring); June 22 – August 1 (Summer)
- Teams: 10

Spring
- Champions: G2 Esports
- Runners-up: Rogue
- Season MVP: Vincent "Vetheo" Berrié (Misfits Gaming)

Summer
- Champions: Rogue
- Runners-up: G2 Esports
- Season MVP: Yasin "Nisqy" Dinçer (MAD Lions)

LEC seasons
- ← 2021 2023 →

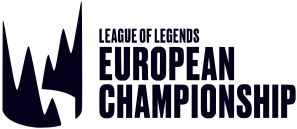
League of Legends European Championship logo

The 2022 LEC season is the fourth year of the League of Legends European Championship (LEC), a professional esports league for the MOBA PC game League of Legends.

== Spring ==
=== Teams ===
Team BDS acquired the LEC spot of FC Schalke 04 for €26.5m at the conclusion of the 2021 season. This is also the final LEC season for Rogue, as they will merge with KOI for the 2023 season.

=== Regular season ===
Pos	Team	W	L	Pts	Qualification
1	Rogue	14	4	10	Advance to winners' bracket
2	Fnatic	13	5	8	Advance to winners' bracket
3	Misfits Gaming	12	6	6	Advance to winners' bracket
4	G2 Esports	11	7	4	Advance to winners' bracket
5	Excel Esports	9	9	0	Advance to losers' bracket
6	Team Vitality	9	9	0	Advance to losers' bracket
7	MAD Lions	8	10	−2	
8	SK Gaming	7	11	−4	
9	Team BDS	4	14	−10	
10	Astralis	3	15	−12	

Source: LoL Esports

Upper round 1	Upper final	Final
1	Rogue	3
3	Misfits Gaming	1
1	Rogue	3
2	Fnatic	2
2	Fnatic	3
4	G2 Esports	1
1	Rogue	0
4	G2 Esports	3
Lower round 1	Lower round 2	Lower round 3	Lower final
2	Fnatic	0
3	Misfits Gaming	0	4	G2 Esports	3
4	G2 Esports	3	4	G2 Esports	3
5	Excel Esports	2	6	Team Vitality	0
6	Team Vitality	3

=== Awards ===
Award	Player	Team
MVP	Vetheo	Misfits Gaming
Coaching Staff of the Split	fredy122 SeeEl	Rogue
Outstanding Rookie	Shlatan	Misfits Gaming
1st Team All-Pro	Odoamne	Rogue
1st Team All-Pro	Malrang	Rogue
1st Team All-Pro	Vetheo	Misfits Gaming
1st Team All-Pro	Upset	Fnatic
1st Team All-Pro	Hylissang	Fnatic
2nd Team All-Pro	BrokenBlade	G2 Esports
2nd Team All-Pro	Jankos	G2 Esports
2nd Team All-Pro	Humanoid	Fnatic
2nd Team All-Pro	Comp	Rogue
2nd Team All-Pro	Trymbi	Rogue
3rd Team All-Pro	Wunder	Fnatic
3rd Team All-Pro	Elyoya	MAD Lions
3rd Team All-Pro	Larssen	Rogue
3rd Team All-Pro	Patrik	Excel Esports
3rd Team All-Pro	Targamas	G2 Esports

== Summer ==
=== Regular season ===
Pos	Team	W	L	Pts	Qualification
1	G2 Esports	12	6	6	Advance to winners' bracket
2	MAD Lions	12	6	6	Advance to winners' bracket
3	Rogue	11	7	4	Advance to winners' bracket
4	Misfits Gaming	10	8	2	Advance to winners' bracket
5	Fnatic	10	8	2	Advance to losers' bracket
6	Excel Esports	9	9	0	Advance to losers' bracket
7	Team Vitality	9	9	0	
8	Astralis	7	11	−4	
9	SK Gaming	7	11	−4	
10	Team BDS	3	15	−12	

Source: LoL Esports

=== Playoffs ===
Upper round 1	Upper final	Final
1	G2 Esports	3
4	Misfits Gaming	1
1	G2 Esports	3
2	Rogue	0
2	Rogue	3
3	MAD Lions	2
1	G2 Esports	0
2	Rogue	3
Lower round 1	Lower round 2	Lower round 3	Lower final
2	Rogue	3
3	MAD Lions	1	5	Fnatic	1
4	Misfits Gaming	0	5	Fnatic	3
5	Fnatic	3	5	Fnatic	3
6	Excel Esports	2

=== Awards ===
MVP: Yasin "Nisqy" Dinçer
