= Team Heretics =

Spanish esports organization

- Short name: TH
- Divisions: Brawl Stars; Call of Duty: Warzone; Esports Virtual Arenas (EVA); League of Legends; Marvel Rivals; Rainbow Six Siege; Valorant
- Founded: August 24, 2016; 10 years ago
- Location: Madrid, Spain
- Colors
- Owners: Heretics Holdings S.L., Arnau Vidal
- President: Antonio Catena
- Partners: Hyundai, Winamax, Logitech, Zowie, Maysun, Theta Network, $TH Fan Token
- Website: teamheretics.com

Team Heretics is a Spanish esports organization founded on 24 August 2016 and based in Madrid, Spain. The club fields professional teams across multiple titles, including Brawl Stars, Call of Duty: Warzone, Esports Virtual Arenas (EVA), League of Legends, Marvel Rivals, Rainbow Six Siege and Valorant.

== History ==
Team Heretics was founded in 2016 in Madrid by Antonio Catena, Arnau Vidal and Jorge "Goorgo" Orejudo as an organization focused on competitive gaming and digital entertainment. Over the following years the club developed a strong Spanish-speaking fanbase and expanded into several international esports competitions.

In July 2022, Team Heretics acquired a franchise slot in the League of Legends European Championship (LEC), replacing Misfits Gaming and marking a milestone in their expansion into top-tier European esports.

In 2025, the organization’s Valorant roster won its first major international title by securing the Esports World Cup in Riyadh, Saudi Arabia, defeating Fnatic 3–2 in a reverse sweep in the grand final.

Beyond competitive results, Team Heretics has expanded through strategic business partnerships. In 2023 the club announced a collaboration with Red Bull, featuring joint activations, branded apparel and social media content.

In 2025, the organization revealed a strategic partnership with CGN Esports focused on Valorant, expanding its footprint across the DACH region and collaborating on shared training initiatives and offline events in Spain and Germany.

== Rosters ==
Team Heretics rosters

Brawl Stars
Handle	Name	Nationality
iKaoss	del Álamo Expósito, Rubén	Spain
Subeme	–	Italy
Marco	–	Italy

Call of Duty: Warzone
Handle	Name	Nationality
Zepa	Zepackic, Mark	Australia
awbz	Ayoubi, Hatem	Australia
Teenie	Czarnoch, Jordan	Australia

Esports Virtual Arenas (EVA)
Handle	Name	Nationality
Chiflyy	–	Spain
ENDLESS	–	Spain
Maik	Perea, Miguel	Spain
S3xyChicken	–	Spain
Vozme	–	Spain

League of Legends (LEC)
Handle	Name	Nationality
Tracyn	Wojtoń, Sebastian	Poland
Daglas	Dagiel, Kacper	Poland
Hype	Byeon Jeong-hyeon	South Korea
Way	Han Gil	South Korea

League of Legends (LES)
Handle	Name	Nationality

Marvel Rivals
Handle	Name	Nationality
Alx	Suchev, Aleks	Bulgaria
Beetle	Batsrati, Ori	Israel
Naga	Dereli, Nikolai	Denmark
Nzo	Keippe, Enzo	France
Tanuki	Rademakers, Roald	Netherlands
Ken	Aspestrand, Leander	Norway

Rainbow Six Siege
Handle	Name	Nationality
Aqui	Aquilano, Alessio	Italy
Lollo	Masuccio, Lorenzo	Italy
Zaaramy	Di Rosa, Luca	Italy
Lasmooo	Berthelot, Vivien	France
Skeptic	–	United Kingdom

Valorant
Handle	Name	Nationality
RieNs	Ecirli, Enes	Turkey
benjyfishy	Fish, Benjamin David	United Kingdom

Rocket League
Handle	Name	Nationality
ajg	Gusinsky, Lautaro Francisco	Argentina
AtomiK	Cortés, Sergio Pérez	Spain
Dorito	Jiménez, Iván Ruiz	Spain
Braan	Fernández, Brandon Porto	Spain

Legend:
- (I) Inactive
- (S) Suspended
- (L) On loan
- (2W) Two-way player
- Substitute
- (injured) Injury / Illness

== Notable achievements ==
- Esports World Cup 2025 Valorant Champions (Riyadh, Saudi Arabia)
- Valorant First Strike Europe Champions (Europe)
- VCT EMEA Stage 1 Champions (Berlin, Germany)

== Other ==
Team Heretics also owns a Call of Duty franchise called Miami Heretics.
