= Karmine Corp =

French esports organization

- Nickname: Blue Wall
- Short name: KC / KCorp
- Divisions: League of Legends; Rocket League; Valorant
- Founded: 30 March 2020; 6 years ago (as Kameto Corp); 16 November 2020; 5 years ago (as Karmine Corp)
- League: League of Legends EMEA Championship; Valorant Champions Tour EMEA; Rocket League Championship Series
- Division: (France) Top tier (2021–2023) (European Union) Top tier
- Based in: Paris, France
- Colors: Blue
- Anthem: KELAWIN
- President: Kamel "Kameto" Kebir
- Official fan club: Ultras
- Partners: Chupa Chups, Direct Assurance, Logitech, Michelin, Red Bull, RhinoShield, Samsung Odyssey, ekWateur
- Website: www.karminecorp.fr

Karmine Corp (French pronunciation: [kaʁmin]; or simply KCorp) is a French professional esports organization incorporated and headquartered in Paris, France. The team employs professional players across six divisions, namely League of Legends, TrackMania, Teamfight Tactics, Super Smash Bros. Ultimate, Valorant and Rocket League.

Founded as Kameto Corp on 30 March 2020 by Twitch streamer duo Kamel "Kameto" Kebir and Zouhair "Kotei" Darji, the team took its current name when streamer and entrepreneur Amine "Prime" Mekri joined it as a founding member and joint owner on 16 November 2020. Under its new leadership, the organization underwent a major restructuring and purchased Nantes-based Team Oplon's Ligue française de League of Legends (or LFL) slot, thereby replacing it beginning with the 2021 season of France's top-level national league.

In 2023, Karmine Corp's League of Legends division was EMEA Masters titleholder. With their 2022 European Masters Spring Split victory, they became the first team to win it thrice, as well as the first team to win a hat-trick. Karmine Corp's Rocket League team won the WePlay Esports Invitational (EMEA region) in 2021. The group's Rocket League team also won the RLCS Fall and Winter EU Regional tournaments held in 2022 and 2023, as well as the RLCS Winter Split Major tournament in 2023. In October 18th, 2023, Kameto announced the team would be joining the LEC after acquiring stake in the slot owned by Danish esports organisation Astralis.

Karmine Corp has had rights to operate esports events and tournaments at Les Arènes, a 3,000-seat venue in Paris, since May 2024. The organization is also part of the Esports World Cup Foundation Club Support Program, funded by the Saudi Arabia Public Investment Fund, which gives organizations like Karmine Corp monetary resources if they want to expand into new esports and if they promote the Esports World Cup effectively. In January 2026, Amine "Prime" Mekri, one of the founder of the structure, left the organization after he was accused of "inappropriate behavior" by several former employees in an investigation led by the media outlet "Revue 21".

== Divisions ==
=== Valorant ===
Karmine Corp entered Valorant in May 2022, signing the roster of Amilwa, mikee, Shin, TakaS and Newzera. On 22 September 2022, they were announced as one of the 10 partner teams for the Valorant EMEA league.

== Rosters ==
Karmine Corp rosters

League of Legends (LEC)
Handle	Name	Nationality
Canna	Kim Chang-dong	South Korea
Yike	Sundelin, Martin	Sweden
kyeahoo	Kang Ye-hoo	South Korea
Caliste	Henry-Hennebert, Caliste	France
Busio	Cwalina, Alan	United States

League of Legends (LFL)
Handle	Name	Nationality
Tao	Xu Hongtao Alessandro	Italy
Yukino	Dang, Johnny	United States
Kamiloo	Haudegond, Kamil	France
Looki	Palfi, Rocco	Germany
Prime	Payet, Olivier	France

League of Legends (NL)
Handle	Name	Nationality
K0ala	Gonzalez, Alexis	France
Oleg	Karkachev, Oleg	Russia
Panda2	Siala, Hamza	Lebanon
Gwen	–	France
Alaric	Cader, Erwin	Sweden
Aymen	Zeghina, Aymen	France

Rocket League
Handle	Name	Nationality
M0nkey M0on	Rogez, Evan	France
bibbaba	Eötvös, Attila	Hungary
reyyn	Unknown, Unknown	France

Valorant (VCT)
Handle	Name	Nationality
avez	Khaled, Hazem	Egypt
dos9	Dastan, Zhumagali	Kazakhstan
LewN	Alkan, Burak	Turkey
SUYGETSU	Ilyushin, Dmitry	Russia
N4RRATE	Massey, Marshall	United States

Valorant (GC)
Handle	Name	Nationality
Glance	Anisimova, Anastasiya	Russia
Alkyia	Erin, Azra	Turkey
anesilia	Ivanova, Anastasia	Russia
Jiex	Yıldırım, Şura	Turkey
safiaa	Leghzal, Safia	Algeria

Legend:
- (I) Inactive
- (S) Suspended
- (L) On loan
- (2W) Two-way player
- Substitute
- (injured) Injury / Illness

== Tournament results ==
List of Karmine Corp tournament results
League of Legends (11)	Teamfight Tactics (6)	Rocket League (9)
First Stand Tournament (FST); Runner-up in 2025; League of Legends EMEA Championship (LEC); Winter Split Winner in 2025; European Masters (EMEA) : Spring Split Winner in 2021 and 2022; Summer Split Winner in 2021, 2023 and 2025; Ligue française (LFL) : Winter Split Winner in 2025; Spring Split Winner in 2021 and 2024; Summer Split Runner-up in 2021 and 2024; Summer Split Winner in 2023 and 2025	Birmingham Major Winner in 2025: Galaxies Championship (Worlds) : Winner in 2020; Rising Legends (EMEA) : Winner G&G in 2022; Winner MA! in 2023; Winner MA! Golden Spatula Cup in 2023; HexLeague : Winner in 2022; Fresh Cup : Winner in 2022	RLCS Winter Split Major : Winner in 2023; RLCS Europe Regional : Winner Fall Cup in 2022; Winner Winter Open in 2023; Winner Winter Cup in 2023; Winner Winter Open 1 in 2025; Winner Winter Open 2 in 2025; Olympic Esports Week Showmatch : Winner in 2023; WePlay Esports Invitational (EMEA) : Winner in 2021; Flip & Spin (EMEA) : Winner in 2023; Birmingham Major: Winner In 2025; Paris Major: Winner In 2026
TrackMania (3)	Super Smash Bros. Ultimate (3)	Valorant
Trackmania World Tour – World Championship : Winner in 2023; Maji Mondays : Winner in 2023; XPEvo Cup : Winner in 2023	Get On My Level : Doubles Winner in 2023; CIRQUE du CFL : Champion Doubles Winner in 2023; Ultimate Fighting Arena : Doubles Winner in 2023	VCT EMEA Kickoff: Winner in 2024
