= Chrissy Costanza =

American musician (born 1995)

- Costanza in 2026

Background information
- Born: Christina Nicola Costanza; August 23, 1995 (age 31); Waldwick, New Jersey, U.S.
- Genres: Pop rock; pop punk
- Occupations: Singer; songwriter; YouTuber
- Instruments: Vocals; piano; keyboards
- Years active: 2007–present
- Label: Fueled by Ramen
- Member of: Against the Current
- Spouse: Tucker Roberts (m. 2025)
- Website: www.chrissyofficial.com

TikTok information
- Page: chrissycostanza
- Followers: 119 thousand

YouTube information
- Channel: Chrissy Costanza
- Years active: 2007–present
- Genres: Gaming; Beauty and make-up; vlogs; Songwriter; Music Videos
- Subscribers: 871 thousand
- Views: 23.2 million
- Last updated: April 19, 2026

Christina Nicola Roberts (née Costanza) (born August 23, 1995) is an American singer, songwriter, musician, and YouTuber. She is best known as the lead vocalist and primary songwriter of the rock band Against the Current.

== Personal life ==
Costanza was born on August 23, 1995, in New Jersey into an Italian American family. She has a younger brother named Michael. Growing up, it was one of her dreams to become a musician. She met current band members Dan Gow and Will Ferri through a mutual friend.

Costanza began her education at The Village School in Waldwick, where she completed both elementary and middle school. She then attended Immaculate Heart Academy, a private all-girls Catholic high school located in Washington Township. In 2013, she enrolled at Fordham University, where she studied for one year.

In 2015, Costanza was in a relationship with Cameron Hurley of We Are the In Crowd. They broke up in 2019, which partly inspired the Against the Current song "That Won't Save Us".

In February 2021, she started dating Tucker Roberts, president of Spectacor Gaming and son of Comcast CEO Brian L. Roberts. Costanza confirmed their relationship in September 2021. They currently live together in Los Angeles with three cats. They became engaged on April 14, 2024. Costanza and Roberts got married in December 2025.

== Career ==
=== 2010s ===
Costanza was introduced to Dan Gow and Will Ferri through a mutual friend in 2011, joining their band. Against the Current soon started to write original songs, whose lyrics were mostly written by Costanza. They also started to post covers of popular songs on YouTube. Against the Current released their first single "Thinking" in 2012. Meanwhile, Costanza made a self-titled YouTube channel and started posting beauty videos. During mid-2013, Against the Current went on tour with Alex Goot.

Against the Current released their first EP Infinity in 2014. On June 6, Costanza made an appearance on Access Hollywood. In February 2015, Against the Current released their second EP Gravity. At the end of April 2015, Against the Current had signed a record deal with Fueled by Ramen. At the end of August, they embarked on their first world tour, the "Gravity World Tour". Against the Current released their debut album In Our Bones on May 20, 2016. In May, following the release of their debut album, Costanza performed live with Alex Goot on his tour on several occasions. While they were in the UK, Against the Current was asked to play a last minute set at the Download Festival. Kerrang!, a UK-based magazine devoted to rock music, said that the band were "writing their future", and described Costanza as "Their Fearless Frontwoman". At the end of June, Rock Sound announced that Costanza would receive her own column in their monthly magazine to talk about Against the Current's debut album, writing her own lyrics for the band, touring, and giving advice on how aspiring bands can be successful.

Against the Current recorded the song "Legends Never Die" for the video game League of Legends, as a tie-in for the 2017 League of Legends World Championship. Against the Current released their second studio album Past Lives in 2018. Against the Current returned to Reading Festival in August after which the band made their first appearances at Lollapalooza 2019 and Pentaport Rock Festival. Costanza collaborated with Cailin Russo on the song "Phoenix" for the 2019 League of Legends World Championship, which she then performed at the finals in Paris and again on New Year's Eve at the Bilibili New Year's Eve Concert in Beijing. Costanza performed the songs "Each Goal" and "Hero Too" as the character Kyoka Jiro in the fourth season of the anime series My Hero Academia.

=== 2020s ===
From July 2020 to May 2021, Costanza was the host of the show Guest House on streaming media channel VENN. At the end of 2020, Costanza teamed up with the winners of the 2019 League of Legends World Championship, FunPlus Phoenix, to release "Phoenix" as their 2021 anthem (This song being different to the 2019 song used for the 2019 League of Legends World Championship with the same name).

On January 10, 2022, Against the Current collaborated with the League of Legends European Championship (LEC) for a song called "Wildfire", with casters Vedius and Drakos as guest vocalists, as part of a promotion for the LEC's 2022 Spring Season.

On July 23, 2024, video game publisher Square Enix and Costanza jointly announced her collaboration with composer Masayoshi Soken and his band the Primals for the song "Give It All", which features in the raid series "The Arcadion", part of the video game expansion Final Fantasy XIV: Dawntrail.

In September 2024, Costanza and rock band Yellowcard created a pop-punk cover of "A Whole New World", which appeared on Walt Disney Records' A Whole New Sound compilation album.

On October 9, 2024, Costanza released her debut solo EP VII. The album's tracklist contained songs released previously, including her debut single "7 Minutes in Hell" which featured Voilà. On November 15, 2024, Costanza released the single "Perfect Crime".

On December 31, 2024, a music video titled "Mavuika: The Vow of Blazing Blood" was released by the official YouTube channel of the action role-playing video game Genshin Impact, featuring Costanza as the lead vocalist.

On October 31, 2025, Chrissy released a Deluxe Album titled "X", in celebration of her one-year anniversary of the original EP, "VII"'s release. In the album, two new songs were introduced, Rope and Weather, plus an extra song, a candlelit version of "7 Minutes in Hell".

Then, later that year, in early November, Chrissy appeared and performed at the League of Legends world championships "Worlds 2025", performing a medley of her League of Legends World Championship songs "Legends Never Die" and "Phoenix" from 2017 & 2019 respectively while incorporating the first World Championship's anthem (2014's "Warriors" by Imagine Dragons) to introduce the event.

== Discography ==
=== Albums ===
List of albums, with selected chart positions
Title	Details	Peak chart positions			
Title	Details	US Alt	US Ind	US Rock	US Heat
VII	Released: October 9, 2024; Label: Self-released; Format: Digital download	—N/a	—N/a	—N/a	—N/a

=== Singles ===
Year	Title	Album
2019	"Phoenix" (featuring Cailin Russo)	—N/a
2020	"Each Goal" (credited as "Kyoka Jiro Starring Chrissy Costanza")	My Hero Academia 4th Original Soundtrack
2020	"Hero Too" (credited as "Kyoka Jiro Starring Chrissy Costanza")	My Hero Academia 4th Original Soundtrack
2024	"7 Minutes in Hell" (featuring Voilà)	VII
2024	"If Looks Could Kill"	VII
2024	"I Tried to Act Your Age"	VII
2024	"You'd Be Right"	VII
2024	"But, What If I Fly?"	VII
2024	"Some Like It Hot"	VII
2024	"Pick Your Poison"	VII
2024	"Perfect Crime"	"VII (Physical Copies Only)" / "X (VII Deluxe Edition)"
2025	"Rope"	"X (VII Deluxe Edition)"
2025	"Weather"	"X (VII Deluxe Edition)"
2025	"7 Minutes in Hell (Candlelight Version)"	"X (VII Deluxe Edition)"
2026	Heavenly	Till Death and Back
2026	Protege	Till Death and Back
2026	White Noise	Till Death and Back

=== Other appearances ===
Year	Title	Album
2018	"Just What to Say" (Dashboard Confessional featuring Chrissy Costanza)	Crooked Shadows
2020	"Phoenix" (FunPlus Phoenix featuring Chrissy Costanza)	—N/a
2021	"Romantic Disaster" (Lil Lotus featuring Chrissy Costanza)	Error Boy
2022	"Half Empty" (State Champs featuring Chrissy Costanza)	Kings of the New Age
2022	"Teenagers" (The Summer Set featuring Chrissy Costanza)	Blossom, Pt.1
2023	"Out of Your Mind" (MisterWives featuring Chrissy Costanza)	Nosebleeds
2024	"Barely Breathing" (From Ashes to New featuring Chrissy Costanza)	Blackout
2024	"Caught It" (Voilà featuring Chrissy Costanza)	Glass Half Empty (Part II)
2024	"Give It All" (The Primals)	Riding Home
2024	"A Whole New World" (with Yellowcard)	A Whole New Sound
2024	"Rivals 'Til the End" (Marvel Rivals)	Marvel Rivals: Galactic Tunes (Original Video Game Soundtrack)
2024	"Blazing Heart – English Version" (HOYO-MiX)	Genshin Impact – Blazing Heart (Mavuika's Character Trailer Song)
2025	"Eye Of The Untold Her (Echo In The Dark)" (Lindsey Stirling & Chrissy Costanza)	Duality (Deluxe)
