= 2019 LST season =

- League: League of Legends SEA Tour
- Sport: League of Legends
- Duration: 20 April – 21 April (Spring); 20 July – 1 September (Summer)
- Teams: 4 (Spring); 8 (Summer)

Spring Split
- Champions: (Thailand) MEGA Esports
- Runners-up: (Malaysia) Team Empire

Summer Split
- Champions: (Thailand) MEGA Esports
- Runners-up: (Malaysia) Axis Empire

Seasons
- ← 2018

The 2019 LST season is the professional League of Legends tournament for the Southeast Asia region. In the spring, the best teams from 4 minor regions participate to determine which team is the best in the region. The summer, also known as Globe Conquerors Manila 2018 (GCM), is the new professional League of Legends league for the entire Southeast Asia region, replaces the Garena Premier League (GPL), with 8 teams from 5 countries participating to determine which team is the best in the region.

== Spring ==
=== Format ===
- Four teams participate

- Winner of National Minor Stage from Indonesia, Malaysia & Singapore, Philippines, and Thailand

- Single elimination bracket
- Semifinals are best of three
- Finals are best of five
- Winner qualifies for the 2019 MSI Play-in stage

==== Qualifications ====
Countries	Slot	Region
MalaysiaSingapore	1	Malaysia & Singapore
Philippines	1	Philippines
Thailand	1	Thailand
Indonesia	1	Indonesia

=== Qualified teams ===
4 teams from 4 countries/areas

Counties	Team(s)	ID
Philippines	(Philippines) Liyab Esports	LYB
Malaysia	(Malaysia) Team Empire	EMP
Thailand	(Thailand) MEGA Esports	MG
Indonesia	(Indonesia) Capital Esports	CAP

=== Results ===
- Semifinals are best of three
- Finals are best of five

Semi-finals
20 April
(Thailand) MEGA Esports	2
(Indonesia) Capital Esports	0
20 April
(Philippines) Liyab Esports	0
(Malaysia) Team Empire	2

Finals
21 April
(Thailand) MEGA Esports	3
(Malaysia) Team Empire	0

=== Final standings ===
Place	Prize	Team	Qualification
1st	$30,000	(Thailand) MEGA Esports	2019 MSI Play-in stage
2nd	$10,000	(Malaysia) Team Empire	
3rd-4th	$5,000	(Indonesia) Capital Esports	
3rd-4th	$5,000	(Philippines) Liyab Esports	

== Summer ==
=== Format ===
- Eight teams participate

- 4 winner teams of Summer National Qualifier (1 team from Indonesia-Malaysia-Singapore, 1 team from Philippines, 2 teams from Thailand).
- 4 teams are invited from Spring Season (winners of Spring National Minor).

- Group Stage

- Single Round Robin
- Matches are best of three
- Top six teams advance to Playoffs

- Playoffs

- Top 6 teams from Summer Season participate
- Single elimination bracket
- Finals are best of five
- All other matches are best of three
- Quarterfinals - 3rd seed faces 6th seed, 4th seed faces 5th seed
- Semifinals - 1st seed faces winner of 4th vs 5th, 2nd seed faces winner of 3rd vs 6th
- Finals - Winners from semifinals play each other
- Winner qualifies for the 2019 World Championship Play-in

=== Qualified teams ===
8 teams from 5 countries/areas

Counties	Team(s)	ID
Philippines	(Philippines) Liyab Esports	LYB
Philippines	(Philippines) SteelWolves Gaia	XSW
Malaysia	(Malaysia) WIN Esports	WIN
Malaysia	(Malaysia) Axis Empire (Note: Team Empire renamed to Axis Empire.)	AXE
Thailand	(Thailand) DeToNator	DTN
Thailand	(Thailand) MEGA Esports	MG
Thailand	(Thailand) Insurgent	ING
Indonesia	(Indonesia) Armored Project (Note: Capital Esports renamed to Armored Project.)	AP

=== Results ===
==== Group stage ====
Matches are best of one

#	Team	~	WIN	MG	LYB	DTN	AXE	XSW	AP	ING	W	L	±	Qualification
1	(Malaysia) WIN Esports	WIN	~	1−0	1−0	1−0	1−0	1−0	1−0	1−0	7	0	+7	Playoffs
2	(Thailand) MEGA Esports	MG	0−1	~	1−0	1−0	1−0	1−0	1−0	1−0	6	1	+5	Playoffs
3	(Philippines) Liyab Esports	LYB	0−1	0−1	~	1−0	1−0	1−0	1−0	1−0	5	2	+3	Playoffs
4	(Thailand) DeToNator	DTN	0−1	0−1	0−1	~	1−0	1−0	1−0	1−0	4	3	+1	Playoffs
5	(Malaysia) Axis Empire	AXE	0−1	0−1	0−1	0−1	~	1−0	1−0	1−0	3	4	−1	Playoffs
6	(Philippines) SteelWolves Gaia	XSW	0−1	0−1	0−1	0−1	0−1	~	1−0	1−0	2	5	−3	Playoffs
7	(Indonesia) Armored Project	AP	0−1	0−1	0−1	0−1	0−1	0−1	~	1−0	1	6	−5	
8	(Thailand) Insurgent	ING	0−1	0−1	0−1	0−1	0−1	0−1	0−1	~	0	7	−7	

==== Playoffs ====
Quarter-finals
7 September
DeToNator	0
(Malaysia) Axis Empire	2
WIN Esports	W
7 September
(Philippines) Liyab Esports	2
(Philippines) SteelWolves Gaia	0
MEGA	W

Semi-finals
8 September
WIN Esports	1
(Malaysia) Axis Empire	2
8 September
MEGA	2
(Philippines) Liyab Esports	0

Final
15 September
(Malaysia) Axis Empire	0
MEGA	3

=== Final standings ===
Place	Prize	Team	Qualification
1st	$15,000	(Thailand) MEGA Esports	2019 World Championship Play-in
2nd	$10,000	(Malaysia) Axis Empire	
3rd-4th	$7,000	(Malaysia) WIN Esports	
3rd-4th	$7,000	(Philippines) Liyab Esports	
5-6th	$4,000	(Philippines) SteelWolves Gaia	
5-6th	$4,000	(Thailand) DeToNator	
7th	$2,000	(Indonesia) Armored Project	
8th	$2,000	(Thailand) Insurgent	
