= In Our Bones World Tour =

2016–17 concert tour by Against the Current

- Tour by Against the Current
- Associated album: In Our Bones
- Start date: September 6, 2016
- End date: October 18, 2017
- Legs: 5
- No. of shows: 17 in Asia; 41 in Europe; 25 in North America; 4 in Oceania; 5 in Latin America; 92 total

Against the Current concert chronology
- Gravity World Tour (2015); The In Our Bones World Tour (2016)

The In Our Bones World Tour was the third headlining concert tour by American pop rock band Against the Current. Launched in support of their first studio album, In Our Bones (2016), the tour began on September 6, 2016 in Seoul, South Korea and concluded on October 18, 2017 in Buenos Aires, Argentina.

== Shows ==
List of concerts, showing date, city, country, venue, opening acts
Date	City	Country	Venue	Opening acts
Asia
September 6, 2016	Seoul	South Korea	YES24 MUV Hall	N/A
September 8, 2016	Singapore	Singapore	Scape the Ground Theater	The Summer State
September 10, 2016	Manila	Philippines	SM Skydome	United Colors Summer Nation
September 13, 2016	Tokyo	Japan	Tsutaya O-East	N/A
September 14, 2016	Osaka	Japan	Umeda Asako	N/A
September 16, 2016	Hong Kong	Hong Kong	Macpherson Stadium	Jude
September 17, 2016	Taipei (Note: The afternoon show originally scheduled for September 17 was cancelled and the evening show postponed to September 19 due to Typhoon Malakas.)	Taiwan	Legacy Taipei	N/A
September 17, 2016	Taipei	Taiwan	Legacy Taipei	N/A
Europe
September 21, 2016	Bristol	England	The Fleece	As It Is; Beach Weather
September 22, 2016	Glasgow	Scotland	Garage	As It Is; Beach Weather
September 23, 2016	Newcastle	England	Riverside	As It Is; Beach Weather
September 24, 2016	Leeds	England	Stylus	As It Is; Beach Weather
September 26, 2016	Belfast	Northern Ireland	Mandela Hall	As It Is; Beach Weather
September 27, 2016	Dublin	Ireland	Academy	As It Is; Beach Weather
September 28, 2016	Nottingham	England	Rescue Rooms	As It Is; Beach Weather
September 30, 2016	London	England	O_{2} Shepherd's Bush Empire	As It Is; Beach Weather
October 1, 2016	Birmingham (Note: The show originally scheduled for October 1 was postponed to October 3 due to illness.)	England	The Asylum	As It Is; Beach Weather
October 2, 2016	Manchester	England	Academy 2	As It Is; Beach Weather
October 5, 2016	Utrecht	Netherlands	Tivoli	Beach Weather
October 6, 2016	Cologne	Germany	Essigfabrik	Beach Weather
October 7, 2016	Antwerp	Belgium	Trix	Beach Weather
October 8, 2016	Paris	France	La Maroquinerie	Beach Weather
North America
November 13, 2016	Pittsburgh	United States	Xtaza	Beach Weather; Cruisr
November 15, 2016	Philadelphia	United States	Foundry @ Fillmore	Beach Weather; Cruisr
November 16, 2016	New York	United States	Irving Plaza	Beach Weather; Cruisr
November 17, 2016	Boston	United States	Middle East	Beach Weather; Cruisr
November 18, 2016	Montreal	Canada	Astral	Beach Weather; Cruisr
November 19, 2016	Toronto	Canada	Opera House	Beach Weather; Cruisr
November 20, 2016	Albany	United States	The Hollow	Beach Weather; Cruisr
November 22, 2016	Baltimore	United States	Baltimore Sound Stage	Beach Weather; Cruisr
November 25, 2016	Charlotte	United States	The Underground	Beach Weather; Cruisr
November 26, 2016	Orlando	United States	Social	Beach Weather; Cruisr
November 27, 2016	Atlanta	United States	Masquerade	Beach Weather; Cruisr
November 29, 2016	Houston	United States	House of Blues	Beach Weather; Cruisr
November 30, 2016	Dallas	United States	House of Blues	Beach Weather; Cruisr
December 2, 2016	Scottsdale	United States	Pub Rock	Beach Weather; Cruisr
December 3, 2016	San Diego	United States	SOMA	Beach Weather; Cruisr
December 4, 2016	West Hollywood	United States	Roxy	Beach Weather; Cruisr
December 5, 2016	Sacramento	United States	Broadwalk	Beach Weather; Cruisr
December 7, 2016	Vancouver	Canada	Rio Theatre	Beach Weather; Cruisr
December 8, 2016	Seattle	United States	Crocodile	Beach Weather; Cruisr
December 10, 2016	Salt Lake City	United States	In the Venue	Beach Weather; Cruisr
December 11, 2016	Denver	United States	Marquis Theatre	Beach Weather; Cruisr
December 13, 2016	Minneapolis	United States	Triple Rock	Beach Weather; Cruisr
December 14, 2016	Chicago	United States	Bottom Lounge	Beach Weather; Cruisr
December 15, 2016	Cleveland Heights	United States	Grog Shop	Beach Weather; Cruisr
December 16, 2016	Detroit	United States	Shelter	Beach Weather; Cruisr
Europe
February 7, 2017	Nijmegen	Netherlands	Doornroosje	Hunger
February 8, 2017	Den Haag	Netherlands	Paard van Troje	Hunger
February 9, 2017	Leuven	Belgium	Het Depot	Hunger
February 11, 2017	Heidelberg	Germany	Karlstorbahnhof	Hunger
February 12, 2017	Dortmund	Germany	FZW Club	Hunger
February 14, 2017	Nantes	France	Ferrailleur	Hunger
February 15, 2017	Bordeaux	France	Iboat	Hunger
February 17, 2017	Madrid	Spain	Sala Chango	Hunger
February 18, 2017	Valencia	Spain	Rock City	Hunger
February 19, 2017	Barcelona	Spain	Sala Boveda	Hunger
February 21, 2017	Lyon	France	Warmaudio	Hunger
February 23, 2017	Milan	Italy	Legend Club	Hunger
February 25, 2017	Munich	Germany	Strom	Hunger
February 26, 2017	Budapest	Hungary	Durer Kert	Hunger
February 28, 2017	Vienna	Austria	Szene	Hunger
March 2, 2017	Warsaw	Poland	Proxima	Hunger
March 3, 2017	Prague	Czech Republic	Lucerna Music Bar	Hunger
March 4, 2017	Luxembourg	Luxembourg	den Atelier	Hunger
March 5, 2017	Hamburg	Germany	Knust	Hunger
March 8, 2017	Brighton	England	The Haunt	Hunger
March 9, 2017	Norwich	England	Epic Studios	Hunger
March 10, 2017	Liverpool	England	O_{2} Academy 2	Hunger
March 12, 2017	Edinburgh	Scotland	Liquid Room	Hunger
March 13, 2017	Sheffield	England	Leadmill	Hunger
March 14, 2017	Cardiff	Wales	The Globe	Hunger
March 17, 2017	London	England	Bush Hall	Hunger
August 24, 2017	London	England	Borderline	SAINTE
Asia
September 17, 2017	Jakarta	Indonesia	MS Hall	N/A
September 19, 2017	Nagoya	Japan	Zepp Nagoya	N/A
September 20, 2017	Tokyo	Japan	Tsutaya O-East	N/A
September 22, 2017	Osaka	Japan	Zepp Bayside	N/A
September 24, 2017	Shanghai	China	Bandai Namco Shanghai Base	N/A
September 26, 2017	Bangkok	Thailand	Rock	N/A
September 28, 2017	Petaling Jaya	Malaysia	The Bee	N/A
September 30, 2017	Manila	Philippines	UP Town Centre (UPTC)	N/A
October 1, 2017	Manila	Philippines	Ayala Mall Solenad	N/A
Oceania
October 3, 2017	Auckland	New Zealand	Tuning Fork	Stateside
October 5, 2017	Brisbane	Australia	The Brightside	Stateside
October 6, 2017	Melbourne	Australia	Corner Hotel	Stateside
October 7, 2017	Sydney	Australia	Factory Theatre	Stateside
Latin America
October 12, 2017	Monterrey	Mexico	Cafe Iguana	TBC
October 13, 2017	Guadalajara	Mexico	Foro Independencia	TBC
October 14, 2017	Mexico City	Mexico	Cosa Nostra	TBC
October 16, 2017	Santiago	Chile	Teatro Cariola	TBC
October 18, 2017	Buenos Aires	Argentina	Roxy Live	TBC
				92 Shows
