= Legends Never Die (Against the Current song) =

2017 single by Against the Current

Single by Against the Current
- Released: September 15, 2017
- Genre: Rock; metal
- Length: 3:55
- Label: Riot Games
- Songwriters: Sebastian Najand; Justin Tranter; Alexander Seaver; Alexander Temple; Edouard Brenneisen; Jason Willey; Kyle Casey Hicks
- Producers: Mako; Oliver; Riot Games Music Team

Against the Current singles chronology
"Young & Relentless" (2016)	"Legends Never Die" (2017)	"Almost Forgot" (2018)

Music video
- "Legends Never Die" (feat. Against the Current) on YouTube

"Legends Never Die" is a song by American rock band Against the Current. Written by Sebastian Najand, Justin Tranter, Alexander Seaver, Alexander Temple, Edouard Brenneisen, Jason Willey, and Kyle Casey Hicks and produced by Mako, Oliver, and the Riot Games Music Team, the song was designed as the theme song for the 2017 League of Legends World Championship. The song was first released on the League of Legends YouTube channel on September 14, 2017, and was released as a single under Riot Games the next day. The ballad has been described as a rock and metal song with lyrics that revolve around never giving up and reaching goals.

"Legends Never Die" was well-received upon its release. Many critics have called it one of the best League of Legends World Championship songs. The song has been certified Gold by the Recording Industry Association of America and Platinum by Recorded Music NZ. The song's animated music video shows League of Legends champions Ashe, Lee Sin, and Garen training to become champions. Against the Current performed "Legends Never Die" at the opening ceremony of the 2017 League of Legends World Championship, and Chrissy Costanza opened the 2025 World Championship with a medley including the song. Norwegian DJ Alan Walker released a remix of the song. "Legends Never Die" has gained wide success on Spotify and YouTube. Costanza has said that the song's success changed her career.

== Background and release ==
Riot Games has released a theme song for each League of Legends World Championship since 2014, when the tournament collaborated with Imagine Dragons, who performed "Warriors" for the 2014 World Championship. The publisher then worked with Nicki Taylor for "Worlds Collide", the 2015 World Championship theme song, and Zedd, who made "Ignite", the 2016 World Championship theme song. Continuing the trend, Riot Games collaborated with Against the Current for "Legends Never Die", which served as the theme song for the 2017 World Championship.

"Legends Never Die" was written by Sebastian Najand, Justin Tranter, Alexander Seaver, Alexander Temple, Edouard Brenneisen, Jason Willey, and Kyle Casey Hicks and produced by Mako, Oliver, and the Riot Games Music Team. Najand explained that with the song, they wanted to have a song with similar elements to previous work but make it sound more personal. He sent demos he created to Seaver, who then sent back a written verse. League of Legends released the song on its YouTube channel on September 14, 2017, and it was officially released as a single on September 15, 2017, under Riot Games. The song's single cover art shows League of Legends champions Ashe and Lee Sin in the silhouette of a "very ambiguous player".

== Composition ==
"Legends Never Die" is a ballad that has been described as a "stadium-sized" rock and metal song. It is three minutes and 55 seconds long. According to the sheet music published to Musicnotes.com by Warner Chappell Music, it is in E minor with a tempo of 140 beats per minute. Chrissy Costanza's vocals range two octaves from E3 to E5 throughout the song. The song begins with a pad that fades in before its buildup between "haunting" verses and a "powerful" and "explosive" chorus. It also utilizes crescendos and heavy percussion.

The lyrics to "Legends Never Die" center around never giving up, facing difficult situations, and reaching goals. Writing for esports.gg, Lawrence "Malystryx" Phillips described the lyrics as about "the emotional struggle and grit needed to be the very best, to become a Legend".

== Reception ==
Upon its release, "Legends Never Die" gained a positive response. Aaron Mickunas of Dot Esports said that the song builds hype for the championship. For Polygon, Julia Lee said that the song "encompasses how epic Worlds is". Upon Against the Current releasing "Wildfire", another collaboration with League of Legends for the 2022 LEC season's European Championship, NME's Ali Shutler called "Legends Never Die" an "incredible, stadium-sized anthem". Daniel Martinez of TheGamer considered it the tenth-best rock song inspired by a video game.

Many critics have called "Legends Never Die" one of the best League of Legends World Championship songs. Phillips ranked the song as the best World Championship song to date in 2025, saying it "has everything you'd ever want from a League of Legends Worlds anthem". Ranking "Legends Never Die" second, Victoria Rose of Fanbyte characterized it as a powerful anthem. Antonia Haynes placed "Legends Never Die" third on her ranking for Esports Insider, praising how the intensity of its lyrics suited its role as a championship anthem. Grantham ranked "Legends Never Die" as the second-best World Championship anthem, saying it can give fans chills.

"Legends Never Die" was certified Gold by the Recording Industry Association of America in February 2022, representing over 500,000 confirmed units being sold in the United States. The song is also certified Gold by the British Phonographic Industry for over 400,000 confirmed sold units in the United Kingdom. In New Zealand, it was certified Platinum by Recorded Music NZ in May 2026. In Denmark, Italy, and Spain, it was certified Gold by IFPI Danmark, FIMI, and Promusicae, respectively.

== Music video ==
On October 18, 2017, the music video for "Legends Never Die" was released. It uses a shortened version of the song. The animated music video includes League of Legends champions Ashe, Lee Sin, and Garen training to become champions. It is different from previous League of Legends World Championship music videos due to more focus on champions than players and having a different animation style. However, there are minor references to the championship at the beginning and ending of the music video. Julia Lee of Polygon considered the music video to be "pretty neat" and "inspiring". Twinfinite's Brandon Dubin called it the fourth-best League of Legends music video for being "pure" and "emphasiz[ing] the message", and described its animation as "unique and impressive". By January 2025, the music video for "Legends Never Die" had received over 289 million views on YouTube, making it the fifth-most viewed video on the League of Legends YouTube channel at the time.

== Live performances ==
Against the Current performed "Legends Never Die" at the Beijing National Stadium at the 2017 League of Legends World Championship opening ceremony. Almost 50,000 people attended the performance. The concert included an augmented reality dragon flying in the crowd before ending up on the stage and growling at the audience. The performance earned Riot Games a Sports Emmy in Outstanding Live Graphic Design. Costanza said the performance was life-changing for her, telling ESPN that it was "wild [...] I perform on stage almost every day now, so I don't get stage fright [...] but [the ceremony] was different from anything else."

Against the Current included the song in the setlist for their tour in the United Kingdom in April 2022, and performed the song in December 2022 as a supporting act for a Pierce the Veil concert at the O2 Forum Kentish Town in London. The band again performed "Legends Never Die" at the O2 Forum Kentish Town in December 2023. At the Slam Dunk Festival 2024, Against the Current played "Legends Never Die" at the Kerrang! Stage, which Carol Giannattasio of MetalTalk believed "took the experience [of the performance] to a whole new level". The band performed the song in August 2024 at Lafayette in London. Costanza opened the 2025 League of Legends World Championship with a medley performance of "Warriors", "Phoenix", and "Legends Never Die". In March 2026, Costanza performed the song along with "Phoenix" and "Wildfire" at the Korean esports festival T1 Home Ground.

== Remix and covers ==
Norwegian DJ and producer Alan Walker produced a remix of "Legends Never Die" that League of Legends released on YouTube. Kat Bein of Billboard characterized his production as changing the song from "anthemic and exciting" to "bright and bouncy" with a "tropical" sound. She also compared the remix's hook to a "half-time hardstyle tune".

In April 2023, symphonic metal band the Dark Side of the Moon covered "Legends Never Die", supported with an original music video, for their debut album Metamorphosis. They released it ahead of the album itself "to shorten the waiting time [of the album]". In November 2025, N.Flying released a medley cover of "Legends Never Die" and the 2023 League of Legends World Championship anthem, "Gods" by NewJeans.

== Legacy ==
"Legends Never Die" was credited by Dylan Oxley of The AU Review as the song that rose Against the Current to fame. Jack Rogers of Rock Sound considered "Legends Never Die" to be a "megahit"; by March 2026, the song had received nearly 750 million streams on Spotify and an estimated 550 million total views across YouTube. It was described by Cecilia Ciocchetti as "one of the most enduring anthems" in the competition's history. Costanza has spoken out about the song's success, saying that it changed her career. She told Ciocchetti that she was "stunned" by its success and that "I have friends in my life that knew Legends Never Die, but that didn't know anything about League of Legends, that found League of Legends because of the song."

"Legends Never Die" was used along with two other League of Legends World Championship theme songs, "Rise" and "Phoenix", in the "Zegends Never Die" DLC pack for Hextech Mayhem.

== Personnel ==
Credits are adapted from Apple Music.

Against the Current

- Chrissy Costanza – vocals
- Dan Gow – electric guitar
- William Ferri – drums

Additional personnel

- Sebastian Najand – songwriter
- Justin Tranter – songwriter
- Alexander Seaver – songwriter, producer
- Alexander Temple – songwriter
- Edouard Brenneisen – songwriter
- Jason Willey – songwriter
- Kyle Casey Hicks – songwriter
- Alex Goot – vocal producer
- Colin Brittain – vocal producer
- Oliver – producer
- Riot Games Music Team – producer, mixing, engineer, mastering engineer

== Certifications ==
Certifications for "Legends Never Die"
Region	Certification	Certified units/sales
Denmark (IFPI Danmark)	Gold	45,000^{‡}
Italy (FIMI)	Gold	50,000^{‡}
New Zealand (RMNZ)	Platinum	30,000^{‡}
Spain (Promusicae)	Gold	30,000^{‡}
United Kingdom (BPI)	Gold	400,000^{‡}
United States (RIAA)	Gold	500,000^{‡}
^{‡} Sales+streaming figures based on certification alone.
