= State of Survival =

State of Survival may refer to:

- State of Survival, a 2009 album by Flipsyde
- State of Survival, a 2019 video game by FunPlus
