= 2018 GPL/SEA Tour season =

- League: Garena Premier League/League of Legends SEA Tour
- Sport: League of Legends
- Duration: 28 March – 1 April (Spring); 28 March – 1 April (Summer)
- Teams: 5 (Spring); 8 (Summer)

Spring Split
- Champions: (Thailand) Ascension Gaming
- Runners-up: (Vietnam) Saigon Jokers

Summer Split
- Champions: (Thailand) Ascension Gaming
- Runners-up: (Thailand) MEGA Esports

Seasons
- ← 2017 2019 →

The 2018 GPL season was the seventh edition of the Garena Premier League, a Riot Games-organised tournament for League of Legends, the multiplayer online battle arena video game. The spring split was a fully professional League of Legends league over all of the Southeast Asia region, with 16 teams from 5 countries/areas to determine which team is the best in the region. The event was replaced by the 2018 SEA Tour, also known as Globe Conquerors Manila 2018 (GCM), for the summer split. It had 8 teams from 5 countries participating to determine which team is the best in the region.

== Spring ==
=== Format ===
- Five teams participate

- Winners of PGS, LCM, SLS, LGS, and TPL.

- Group Stage

- Single round robin
- Matches are best of one
- Top four teams advance to Playoffs

- Playoffs

- Single elimination bracket
- Matches are best of five

- Winner qualifies for the 2018 Mid-Season Invitational Play-In

==== Qualifications ====
Countries	Slot	League
Malaysia	1	2018 LCM Spring
Singapore	1	2018 SLS Spring
Philippines	1	2018 PGS Spring
Thailand	1	2018 TPL Spring
Indonesia	1	2018 LGS Spring

=== Qualified teams ===
5 teams from 5 countries/areas

Counties	League	Team(s)	ID
Philippines	Pro Gaming Series (PGS)	(Philippines) Mineski	MSK
Malaysia	LOL Championship Malaysia (LCM)	(Malaysia) KL Hunters	KLH
Singapore	Singapore Legends Series (SLS)	(Singapore) Sovereign	SVR
Thailand	Thailand Pro League (TPL)	(Thailand) Ascension Gaming	ASC
Indonesia	LOL Garuda Series (LGS)	(Indonesia) Bigetron E-Sports	BGE

=== Results ===
==== Group stage ====
Matches are best of one

#	Team	~	MSK	ASC	SVR	KLH	BGE	W	L	±
1	(Philippines) Mineski	MSK	~	1−0	1−0	0−1	1−0	3	1	+2
2	(Thailand) Ascension Gaming	ASC	0−1	~	1−0	1−0	1−0	3	1	+2
3	(Singapore) Sovereign	SVR	0−1	0−1	~	1−0	1−0	2	2	+0
4	(Malaysia) KL Hunters	KLH	0−1	0−1	1−0	~	1−0	2	2	+0
5	(Indonesia) Bigetron E-Sports	BGE	0−1	0−1	0−1	0−1	~	0	4	−4

==== Playoffs ====
Semi-finals
31 March
(Philippines) Mineski	1
(Malaysia) KL Hunters	3
31 March
(Thailand) Ascension Gaming	3
(Singapore) Sovereign	0

Finals
1 April
(Malaysia) KL Hunters	1
(Thailand) Ascension Gaming	3
3rd-place match
1 April
(Philippines) Mineski	3
(Singapore) Sovereign	0

=== Final standings ===
Place	Team	Qualification
1st	(Thailand) Ascension Gaming	2018 MSI Play-In; Rift Rivals 2018
2nd	(Malaysia) KL Hunters	Rift Rivals 2018
3rd	(Philippines) Mineski	Rift Rivals 2018
4th	(Singapore) Sovereign	
5th	(Indonesia) Bigetron E-Sports	

== Summer ==
=== Format ===
- Eight teams participate

- With the recent conclusion of the 2018 GPL Spring, Thailand, Philippines and Malaysia will have 2 teams each country, while Singapore and Indonesia will have 1 team each country.

- Group Stage

- Teams are drawn into two groups based on seeding. Four teams each group.

- If a country has 2 teams, they can not placed in same group (with this, team from Indonesia can not placed in same group with team from Singapore).
- The top seeds from Thailand and Malaysia can not placed in same group.

- Double Round Robin.
- Matches are best of one.
- Top two teams each group advance to semifinals.

- Semifinals

- 1st place teams from the group stage each face a 2nd place team.
- Matches are best of five.
- Winners advance to final.

- Final

- Match is best of five.
- Winner qualifies for the 2018 Season World Championship Play-In

==== Qualifications ====
Countries	Slot	League
Malaysia	2	2018 Malaysia Qualifiers
Philippines	2	2018 Philippines Qualifiers
Thailand	2	2018 Thailand Qualifiers
Indonesia	1	2018 Indonesia Qualifiers
Singapore	1	2018 Singapore Qualifiers

=== Qualified teams ===
8 teams from 5 countries/areas

Counties	Seed	Team(s)	ID
Philippines	1	(Philippines) Mineski	MSK
Philippines	2	(Philippines) ArkAngel	AA
Malaysia	1	(Malaysia) KL Hunters	KLH
Malaysia	2	(Malaysia) Team Anything	TAT
Thailand	1	(Thailand) Ascension Gaming	ASC
Thailand	2	(Thailand) MEGA Esports	MG
Singapore	1	(Singapore) Resurgence	RSG
Indonesia	1	(Indonesia) Bigetron E-Sports	BGE

=== Results ===
==== Group stage ====
Matches are best of one

Group A

#	Team	~	ASC	RSG	MSK	TAT	W	L	±
1	(Thailand) Ascension Gaming	ASC	~	2−0	2−0	2−0	6	0	+6
2	(Singapore) Resurgence	RGS	0−2	~	1−1	2−0	3	3	+0
3	(Philippines) Mineski	MSK	0−1	1−1	~	1−1	2	4	−2
4	(Malaysia) Team Anything	KLH	0−2	0−2	1−1	~	1	5	−4

Group B

#	Team	~	MG	KLH	AA	BGE	W	L	±
1	(Thailand) MEGA Esports	MG	~	1−1	1−1	2−0	4	2	+2
2	(Malaysia) KL Hunters	KLH	1−1	~	1−1	2−0	4	2	+2
3	(Philippines) ArkAngel	AA	1−1	1−1	~	1−1	3	3	+0
4	(Indonesia) Bigetron E-Sports	BGE	0−2	0−2	1−1	~	1	5	−4

- 1st Place Tiebreaker (Thailand) MEGA Esports 1− 0 KL Hunters (Malaysia)

==== Playoffs ====
Semi-finals
18 August
(Thailand) Ascension Gaming	3
(Malaysia) KL Hunters	1
18 August
(Thailand) MEGA Esports	3
(Singapore) Resurgence	1

Finals
19 August
(Thailand) Ascension Gaming	3
(Thailand) MEGA Esports	0

=== Final standings ===
Place	Prize	Team	Qualification
1st	$100,000	(Thailand) Ascension Gaming	2018 Season World Championship Play-In
2nd	$50,000	(Thailand) MEGA Esports	
3rd-4th	$25,000	(Malaysia) KL Hunters	
3rd-4th	$25,000	(Singapore) Resurgence	
5-6th	$15,000	(Philippines) ArkAngel	
5-6th	$15,000	(Philippines) Mineski	
7-8th	$10,000	(Indonesia) Bigetron E-Sports	
7-8th	$10,000	(Malaysia) Team Anything	
