= Callum Daniel =

British entrepreneur (born 2008)

- Born: Callum Daniel; August 28, 2008 (age 18); London, England
- Relatives: Malcolm Daniel
- Awards: IET Young STEM Personality of the Year

Callum Daniel (born 28 August 2008) is a British entrepreneur and presenter. He is the founder of iCodeRobots, a technology company based in Loughborough University London. It is focused on giving children of all backgrounds and income levels access to classes training them to build and code robots and engaging them in a wide range of current and future tech.

At seven years old, he became one of the youngest CEOs in the UK.

== Early life ==
Daniel was born in London, England, the son of a British mother Dionne Daniel and British father Paul Daniel John-Charles. Daniel is an only child raised in London. Daniel is the great-grandson of Malcolm Daniel who served as a Senator in Antigua's Parliament, the first President of Antigua and Barbuda's workers union and also 2nd Vice President of the Caribbean Congress of Labour.

== Career ==
By partnering with other tech firms, Daniel managed to develop and execute a campaign that led to free sessions for 1,000 children. In 2020 Daniel became part of a team who fund raised and created over 6500 PPE Visors for the healthcare industry during lockdown.

In 2017 Daniel first spoke at Kidzania's inaugural Kidpreneur festival to inspire business leaders of the future and introduce children to the world of robotics by conducting robotic workshops. Financial Times journalist Jonathan Moules reviewed Daniel's workshop, which lead to more interest in Daniel's mission. Daniel continued to feature in the media on his mission to inspire children into technology including a part in BBC documentary Kidpreneurs, BBC Radio one stories, and various other media.

In 2018, Daniel's career extended to becoming a host and presenter, including a feature on LEGO's Discover channel with a series encouraging children to code and build robots, tech conferences, award shows, and red carpet film premieres where he interviews talent such as Will Smith, Pharrell, Guy Ritchie, and Alan Menken.

Listed as a Change Maker at the 2020 Children's Media Conference (CMC), Daniel was featured in a video in which he spoke about inspiring future generations and the role of media in educating children about the tech industry.

Daniel became an ambassador for Guild Esports Academy in early 2021.

== Awards ==
- Young STEM Personality of the Year 2021, global award by The Institute of Engineering and Technology
- Diana Award 2020 winner. Established in memory of Diana, Princess of Wales by The Diana Award
- Young Entrepreneur Award 2018 - by Newham Youth Achievement Award
- Inspire Awards 2017- The Soul Project
- Educational Innovation Award 2018 - by RoundTable Global
- Best media coverage of the year award - Ultra Education
