= Valorant Masters Copenhagen 2022 =

Gaming tournament

Tournament information
- Game: Valorant
- Location: Copenhagen
- Date: July 10–24, 2022
- Administrator: Riot Games
- Host: Denmark
- Venue(s): Forum Copenhagen (semifinals and grand finals)
- Teams: 12
- Purse: US $650,000

Final positions
- Champion: FunPlus Phoenix
- 1st runner-up: Paper Rex
- 2nd runner-up: OpTic Gaming

The Valorant Masters Copenhagen 2022, also known as Valorant Masters 2022 Stage 2, was an international esports tournament organized by Riot Games for the first-person shooter game Valorant, as part of the Valorant Champions Tour's 2022 competitive season. The tournament ran from July 10–24, 2022 in Copenhagen, Denmark.

FunPlus Phoenix of EMEA won their first international event after defeating APAC's Paper Rex in the five-game championship series, 3–2.

== Venue ==
Copenhagen was the city chosen to host the competition. All matches were played at Forum Copenhagen.

Copenhagen, Denmark
Forum Copenhagen

== Qualification and format ==
Similar with the previous Masters, the champion teams from the Asia-Pacific; EMEA (Europe, the Middle East and Africa) and North America Stage 2 Challengers were all directly qualified to the upper bracket quarterfinals. Which of the two regions Latin America and Brazil win the South America Playoff (the match between two runner-up teams from Challengers of twos) will get quarterfinals spot for their Challengers winner. The remaining eight teams were seeded in the GSL formatted group stage and were divided into two groups of four teams.

Region		Path	Team	ID
Starting in the upper bracket quarterfinals
EMEA		EMEA Stage 2 Challengers winner	Fnatic	FNC
North America		NA Stage 2 Challengers winner	XSET	XSET
Asia-Pacific	MYSG	MYSG Stage 2 Challengers winner ►APAC Stage 2 Challengers winner	Paper Rex	PRX
Latin America	LATAM South	LATAM South Stage 2 Challengers runner-up ►LATAM Stage 2 Challengers winner	Leviatán	LEV
Starting in the group stage
EMEA		EMEA Stage 2 Challengers runner-up	FunPlus Phoenix	FPX
EMEA		EMEA Stage 2 Challengers third-place	Guild Esports	GLD
North America		NA Stage 2 Challengers runner-up	OpTic Gaming	OPTC
Asia-Pacific	Thailand	Thailand Stage 2 Challengers winner ►APAC Stage 2 Challengers runner-up	XERXIA Esports	XIA
South Korea		KR Stage 2 Challengers winner	DRX	DRX
Japan		JP Stage 2 Challengers winner	NORTHEPTION	NTH
Brazil		BR Stage 2 Challengers winner	LOUD	LOUD
Latin America	LATAM South	LATAM South Stage 2 Challengers winner ►LATAM Stage 2 Challengers runner-up ►South America Stage 2 Playoff winner	KRÜ Esports	KRÜ

== Group stage ==
=== Group A ===
Opening Matches
OpTic Gaming	0
Guild Esports	2
LOUD	1
KRÜ Esports	2
Elimination Match
OpTic Gaming	2
LOUD	1

Winner's Match
Guild Esports	2
KRÜ Esports	1
Decider Match
KRÜ Esports	0
OpTic Gaming	2

Advanced to Playoffs
Guild Esports
OpTic Gaming

=== Group B ===
Opening Matches
FunPlus Phoenix	2
XERXIA Esports	1
DRX	2
NORTHEPTION	0
Elimination Match
XERXIA Esports	1
NORTHEPTION	2

Winner's Match
FunPlus Phoenix	1
DRX	2
Decider Match
FunPlus Phoenix	2
NORTHEPTION	0

Advanced to Playoffs
DRX
FunPlus Phoenix

== Playoffs ==
All seeded teams and the teams qualified from the group stage qualified for the knockout playoffs. All matches were in a best-of-three series, except for the Lower Bracket Final and the Grand Finals, which were a best-of-five series.

All times are in Central European Summer Time, UTC+02.

Upper Bracket - Round 1	Upper Bracket Semifinals	Upper Bracket Final	Grand Final
Paper Rex	2
Guild Esports	0
Paper Rex	2
Fnatic	0
Fnatic	2
FunPlus Phoenix	0
Paper Rex	2
OpTic Gaming	1
Leviatán	1
DRX	2
DRX	1
OpTic Gaming	2
XSET	0
OpTic Gaming	2	Paper Rex	2
FunPlus Phoenix	3
Lower Bracket - Round 1	Lower Bracket Quarterfinals	Lower Bracket Semifinals	Lower Bracket Final
DRX	0
Guild Esports	1	FunPlus Phoenix	2	OpTic Gaming	1
FunPlus Phoenix	2	FunPlus Phoenix	2	FunPlus Phoenix	3
Fnatic	1
Fnatic	2
Leviatán	2	Leviatán	1
XSET	1

=== Upper Bracket - Round 1 ===
Upper Round 1	July 14	Paper Rex	2	–	0	Guild Esports	Copenhagen, Denmark
	5:00 pm (UTC+2)	Statistics					Forum Copenhagen
		13	Ascent			4	
		14	Fracture			12	
			~~Icebox~~				

Upper Round 1	July 15	Fnatic	2	–	0	FunPlus Phoenix	Copenhagen, Denmark
	7:30 pm (UTC+2)	Statistics					Forum Copenhagen
		13	Icebox			10	
		13	Haven			4	
			~~Ascent~~				

Upper Round 1	July 15	Leviatán	1	–	2	DRX	Copenhagen, Denmark
	5:00 pm (UTC+2)	Statistics					Forum Copenhagen
		13	Ascent			6	
		5	Breeze			13	
		11	Haven			13	

Upper Round 1	July 16	XSET	0	–	2	OpTic Gaming	Copenhagen, Denmark
	9:00 pm (UTC+2)						Forum Copenhagen
		7	Haven			13	
		6	Bind			13	
			~~Ascent~~				

=== Upper Bracket Semifinals ===
Upper Semifinals A	July 17	Paper Rex	2	–	0	Fnatic	Copenhagen, Denmark
							Forum Copenhagen
		13	Ascent			11	
		13	Bind			10	

Upper Semifinals B	July 17	DRX	1	–	2	OpTic Gaming	Copenhagen, Denmark
							Forum Copenhagen
		13	Fracture			4	
		4	Breeze			13	
		11	Bind			13	

=== Lower Bracket - Round 1 ===
Lower Round 1	July 16	Guild Esports	1	–	2	FunPlus Phoenix	Copenhagen, Denmark
	5:00 pm (UTC+2)	Statistics					Forum Copenhagen
		11	Ascent			13	
		13	Breeze			3	
		4	Bind			13	

Lower Round 1	July 16	Leviatán	2	–	1	XSET	Copenhagen, Denmark
	8:00 pm (UTC+2)						Forum Copenhagen
		9	Split			13	
		15	Ascent			13	
		16	Haven			14	

=== Upper / Lower Bracket Final ===
Upper Final	July 22	v	Copenhagen, Denmark
			Forum Copenhagen

Lower Final	July 23	v	Copenhagen, Denmark
			Forum Copenhagen

=== Grand Final ===
Grand Final	July 24	Paper Rex	2	–	3	FunPlus Phoenix	Copenhagen, Denmark
	5:00 pm (UTC+2)	Statistics					Forum Copenhagen
		3	Bind			13	
		13	Icebox			7	
		7	Fracture			13	
		13	Haven			7	
		9	Breeze			13	

== Final standings ==
Rank	Team	Winnings (USD)	Circuit Points
1st	FunPlus Phoenix	$200,000	1,000
2nd	Paper Rex	$120,000	750
3rd	OpTic Gaming	$85,000	500
4th	Fnatic	$65,000	400
5th–6th	DRX	$40,000	300
5th–6th	Leviatán	$40,000	300
7th–8th	Guild Esports	$25,000	250
7th–8th	XSET	$25,000	250
9th–10th	KRŬ Esports	$15,000	200
9th–10th	NORTHEPTION	$15,000	200
11th–12th	LOUD	$10,000	150
11th–12th	XERXIA Esports	$10,000	150
