= Phoenix (Cailin Russo and Chrissy Costanza song) =

Single by Cailin Russo and Chrissy Costanza
- Released: October 8, 2019
- Length: 3:17
- Label: Riot Games
- Songwriters: Alex Seaver; Eduardo Brenneisen; Stephen Aiello

Music video
- "Phoenix" on YouTube

"Phoenix" is a song by American singers Cailin Russo and Chrissy Costanza, released on October 8, 2019, by Riot Games. Written by Alex Seaver, Eduardo Brenneisen, and Stephen Aiello, it was the theme song for the 2019 League of Legends World Championship.

== Background ==
"Phoenix" was written by Alex Seaver, Eduardo Brenneisen, and Stephen Aiello. Riot Games recruited American singers Cailin Russo and Chrissy Costanza to perform the anthem for the 2019 League of Legends World Championship. Costanza had previously featured on a World Championship song with the band Against The Current. This release made her the first artist to appear on two such anthems. Unlike in previous years, "Phoenix" appeared after the tournament had already begun. Leaks on the Apple Music and YouTube during the play-in finals forced Riot to release the song and video on October 8. Audio quality varied by platform. The Apple Music and SoundCloud versions reportedly featured clearer vocals and stronger bass than those on YouTube and Spotify.

This was the first World Championship video to feature real professional players alongside animation. Professional gamers Faker, Rookie, and Caps appear in the video, shown confronting performance pressure and online harassment. Visuals include a scene on an abandoned train and players fighting off insecurities resembling a "fungal infection."

== Composition and lyrics ==
A power ballad, "Phoenix" is slower and more downbeat than standard esports anthems. PC Gamer described it as a "quieter... Eye of the Tiger for the esports scene." Lyrical themes include survival and overcoming internal obstacles, with lines such as "You gotta conquer the monster in your head" and "Go bury your demons." Critics noted the focus on facing personal demons, with one describing the writing as "painfully on the nose."

== Reception ==
Early audience reactions were mixed. Fans on social media found the song "dull" or lacking "hype." Retrospective rankings have been more positive. Upcomer ranked "Phoenix" the second-best World Championship anthem in 2021, while a 2025 Esports list placed it seventh. PC Gamer called it "suitably heroic" but noted it was "more down" than the 2018 release.

== Charts ==
Chart performance for "Phoenix"
| Chart (2019) | Peak position |
|---|---|
| Hungary (Single Top 40) | 19 |
| South Korea Download (Gaon) | 134 |
| US World Digital Song Sales (Billboard) | 15 |
