= League of Legends SEA Tour =

2018–2019 esports league in Southeast Asia

- Formerly: Garena Premier League
- Sport: League of Legends
- Founded: 2018
- First season: Summer 2018
- Folded: 2019
- Replaced by: Pacific Championship Series (merged with LMS)
- Owners: FunPlus; Garena
- No. of teams: 4 (Spring); 8 (Summer)
- Countries: Southeast Asia (Indonesia, Malaysia, Philippines, Singapore, Thailand)
- Last champion: (Thailand) MEGA Esports (2nd title)
- Qualification: LST Qualifiers
- Broadcasters: Garena Live, YouTube
- International cups: Mid Season Invitational; World Championship
- Website: www.lolseatour.com

The League of Legends SEA Tour (LST) was a professional League of Legends esports tournament in Southeast Asia that was founded in 2018 by Garena as a replacement for the Garena Premier League (GPL). The competition consisted of teams who qualified through the LST qualifiers of each minor region: Indonesia–Malaysia–Singapore, Philippines, and Thailand. Winners of the LST represented Southeast Asia at the Mid-Season Invitational and World Championship.

It was announced in September 2019 that the LST would be merged with the League of Legends Master Series (Taiwan/Hong Kong/Macau) to create a new professional league for all Garena-affiliated regions (excluding Vietnam), the Pacific Championship Series (PCS).

== Minor regions of the LST ==
In 2019, based on the League of Legends local servers in Southeast Asia that have been released by Garena, LST is divided into some minor regions. Each region will have one spot in the spring season, while in the summer season it will be decided based on the results of the spring season.

In May 2019, Indonesia's local server for League of Legends was closed by Garena. Indonesian players were transferred to the SAM server (Singapore & Malaysia) and Indonesia was merged with Malaysia–Singapore to form a single minor region for the 2019 Summer Season.

Minor region (local server)	Spring	Summer
Indonesia	1	3
Malaysia; Singapore	1	3
Philippines	1	2
Thailand	1	3

== Format (2019 Summer) ==
Ranked Qualifier (Stage 1):

- Teams can register online and gain points by playing Ranked Solo Queue at local server: PH server (Philippines), TH server (Thailand), SAM server (Singapore & Malaysia, merged with Indonesia since May 2019).
- Top 7 teams of PH server, TH server and top 6 of SAM server with the highest points qualify for Stage 2.

National Qualifier (Stage 2):

- 8 teams participate in each minor region:
  - Some qualified through Stage 1.
  - Runner-up teams of Spring National Minor are invited.
- Double Elimination.
- Finals are best of three, all other matches are best of one.
- 4 winners qualify for Main Season: 1 from Indonesia-Malaysia-Singapore, 1 from Philippines, 2 from Thailand.

Main Season – Group Stage (Stage 3):

- 8 teams participate:
  - 4 winner teams of Summer National Qualifier (1 team from Indonesia-Malaysia-Singapore, 1 team from Philippines, 2 teams from Thailand).
  - 4 teams are invited from Spring Season (winners of Spring National Minor).
- Single Round Robin. Matches are best of three.
- Top 6 teams advance to Play-off Stage.

Main Season – Play-off Stage (Stage 4):

- Top 6 teams from Group Stage participate.
- Single elimination bracket. Matches are best of five.
- Winner will represent Southeast Asia at the 2019 League Of Legends World Championship.

== Results ==
Season		Main event date	Champion	Runner-up	3rd–4th
2018	SEA Tour Summer	13–19 August 2018	Ascension Gaming	MEGA Esports	Kuala Lumpur Hunters; Resugence
2019	Spring	20–21 April 2019	MEGA Esports	Team Empire	Capital Esports; Liyab Esports
2019	Summer	20 July – 15 September 2019	MEGA Esports	AXIS Empire	Liyab Esports; WIN Esports

Minor Region	Champion	Runner-up	3rd–4th
Thailand	3	1	0
Indonesia; Malaysia; Singapore	0	2	4
Philippines	0	0	2

(*)Team disbanded prior to the following season

Team	Champion	Runner-up	3rd–4th
MEGA Esports	2	1	0
Ascension Gaming*	1	0	0
Team Empire/AXIS Empire	0	2	0
Liyab Esports	0	0	2
Kuala Lumpur Hunters*	0	0	1
WIN Esports	0	0	1
Capital Esports	0	0	1
Resugence	0	0	1
