= FunPlus =

Video game developer and publisher

- Type: Private
- Industry: Video games
- Founded: 2010; 16 years ago
- Headquarters: Switzerland
- Area served: Worldwide
- Key people: Andy Zhong (CEO); Chris Petrovic (CBO)
- Products: State of Survival; King of Avalon; Guns of Glory; Stormshot; Sea of Conquest; Call of Antia; Misty Continent; Tiles Survive; Foundation: Galactic Frontier; Aniimo; DC:Dark Legion
- Number of employees: 2,000+ (2024)
- Website: www.funplus.com

FunPlus is a video game developer and publisher headquartered in Switzerland, with operations in China, Singapore, Portugal and Spain. The company's CEO is Andy Zhong.

Founded in 2010, the company develops mobile strategy games, including: State of Survival, King of Avalon, Guns of Glory, Stormshot, Misty Continent, Foundation: Galactic Frontier, Tiles Survive, Sea of Conquest and DC:Dark Legion. FunPlus has more recently expanded into console and PC development through subsidiaries, including Studio Ellipsis, based in Portugal, and Pawprint Studio, based in China.

FunPlus also operates an esport division, FunPlus Esports, whose League of Legends team, FunPlus Phoenix, won the 2019 World Championship.

== History ==
Founding and early growth (2010–2015)

FunPlus was founded in 2011 by Andy Zhong and Yitao Guan in Silicon Valley as Halfquest, focusing on web game development in Silicon Valley and Beijing. In Beijing, the company created DianDian Interactive game studio, which became the casual games division of the company. In October 2010, the company launched its first web game, Family Farm, on German social network VZ. In June 2011, the game appeared on Facebook.

In 2012, the company was relocated to Beijing and rebranded as FunPlus. In the same year, FunPlus launched its first mobile game, Family Farm Seaside, as well as a second web game, Royal Story.

A third web game, Happy Acres, launched in 2014. In the same year, the company established a mobile strategy game studio, KingsGroup, in Beijing.

Strategy games and international growth (2016-2020)

KingsGroup launched its first mobile strategy game, King of Avalon, in 2016. In the same year, FunPlus sold its DianDian Interactive studio to the Century Group, a listed company on the Shenzhen stock exchange, for $1 billion, after which the game studio was renamed Century Game. After the sale of DianDian studio, FunPlus focused on investing in other game studios globally as well as developing strategy games, e-sports, live-streaming and game publishing platforms.

In 2017, KingsGroup launched its second mobile strategy game, Guns of Glory. In 2018, FunPlus started to grow its international studio presence with a new studio in Beijing, as well as a new mobile development studios in Shanghai.

In 2019, KingsGroup launched and self-published mobile strategy game State of Survival. The game has since achieved more than 100 million downloads. FunPlus continued its international growth with new studios and a publishing office in Barcelona.

In 2020, the company's Guangzhou studio was opened. In December 2020, FunPlus opened its corporate global headquarters in Switzerland and moved all the game titles under the publishing accounts of FunPlus International.

Diversification and collaborations (2021-2023)

In 2021, FunPlus collaborated with AMC to introduce The Walking Dead to State of Survival. In April 2021, Imagendary Studios was acquired by FunPlus. In December 2021, the company collaborated with DC to introduce the Joker to State of Survival.

In January 2022, FunPlus launched the match-3 RPG Call of Antia. In March 2022, FunPlus announced a partnership with Orlando Bloom to bring his character to mobile strategy title, King of Avalon.

In January 2023, FunPlus expanded its publishing operations in Barcelona to game development, focused on hybrid-casual games. In July 2023, FunPlus announced DC: Dark Legion, a new strategy video game set in the DC universe currently in development. In August 2023, Imagendary Studios was "deeply restructured" and laid off a majority of its employees. Studio head Ryan Pollreisz and other lead staff members left the company in the weeks prior. In October 2023, FunPlus announced a partnership with Capcom to bring Resident Evil characters to mobile strategy title, State of Survival. In addition to the ones previously mentioned, FunPlus launched more collaborations with IP brands such as Tomb Raider, Teenage Mutant Ninja Turtles and Pacific Rim.

Recent releases and expansion (2024–2025)

In January 2024, FunPlus launched the strategy game Sea of Conquest: Pirate War. In May 2024, FunPlus and SkyDance Games announced Foundation: Galactic Frontier, a collaboration for a new strategy game. In November 2024, FunPlus opened a new Studio in Lisbon, spearheaded by the veteran gaming industry leader Alexandre Amancio. Studio Ellipsis is focusing on cross-platform game development and growing IP across multiple mediums. The Studio expanded into transmedia with the launch of its first Comic Series: Cradle of the Gods in October 2024.

FunPlus marked its 15th anniversary in May 2025 with a global campaign that brought together team members and in-game characters, alongside reflections from CEO Andy Zhong and Chief Business Officer Chris Petrovic on the company’s journey and future ambitions.

At the Xbox Games Showcase in June 2025, FunPlus’s publishing label Kingsglory revealed Aniimo, a free-to-play, creature-collecting open-world action RPG from Pawprint Studio, slated for 2026. The announcement highlighted its unique “Twining” mechanic, which allows players to merge with magical creatures, and opened registration for a closed beta.

That same month, State of Survival added a crossover with the video game Hitman, featuring the character Agent 47.

In July 2025, FunPlus released Tiles Survive!, a mobile strategy-survival game, following a former special forces officer building a stronghold against a zombie horde (the game reached 20 million players by April 2026).

Later, Aniimo was also featured at Gamescom 2025 in Cologne, Germany, where FunPlus, in partnership with Xbox, presented a playable beta test of the game for attendees, marking its first public hands-on beta after the Xbox reveal.

In August 2025, FunPlus advanced its “gaming for good” efforts by renewing its Play2Act partnership with PlanetPlay and the United Nations Development Program (UNDP), engaging players on environmental action through in-game polls under the EU- and UK-funded GREAT project. That same month, State of Survival launched a crossover with Terminator 2: Judgment Day, featuring Sarah Connor, the T-800, the T-1000, and themed limited-time content.

In October 2025, FunPlus launched the mobile strategy title Foundation: Galactic Frontier, an action-oriented adaptation of the sci-fi Foundation series, and DC: Dark Legion won two awards: Mobile Game Adaptation of the Year, and Mobile Game of the Year, at the GamingonPhone Awards 2025.

2026

State of Survival opened the year with a Rambo-themed crossover event in February 2026, introducing jungle-combat content tried to the character. Tiles Survive! passed 20 million players in April 2026, less than a year after launch.

King of Avalon marked its 10th anniversary in May 2026, and that same month, State of Survival added a crossover with the fighting-game series The king of Fighters XV, featuring the characters Mai Shiranui and B. Jenet.

In June 2026, DC: Dark Legion ran a Supergirl-themed in-game event from June 2025 to July 1st, timed to Warner Bros' theatrical release of Supergirl, and expanded the game's pre-registration into new Asian regions.

In August 2026, State of Survival added Silent Hill crossover featuring the character Heather Mason. That same month, at Gamescom 2026, Pawprint Studio confirmed Aniimo's release dates and announced a partnership using Nvidia's ACE technology. Aniimo lanched on PlayStation 5, Xbox Series X/S, and PC via Steam and Epic Game Store on September 16, 2026, followed by a mobile release on the App Store and Google Play on September 23, 2026.

== Awards ==
FunPlus and its games have received a number of industry rankings and awards. PockerGamer.biz has repeatedly ranked the company among its top mobile game makers:

- 32nd in 2017
- 25th in 2019
- 21st in 2021
- 25th in 2023
- 24th in 2025

State of Survival won the 'Best Simulation Game' at Samsung's Best of Galaxy Store Awards in 2020, 'Best Strategy Game' at Huawei's AppGallery Editor's Choice Award in 2021, and a Mobile GameDev Awards from GameRefinery for 'Biggest Evolver' and 'Best Use of IP in a collaboration event'.

In 2022, King of Avalon trailer featuring Orlando Bloomwon a Silver Clio Award.

in 2024, Sea of Conquest: Pirate War, won gold in three categories at the NYX Awards and was later named Best Strategy Game of the Year at the Pocket Gamer Mobile Games Awards.

in 2025, DC: Dark Legion won Mobile Game Adaptation of the Year, and Mobile Game of the Year at the GamingonPhone Awards.

Awards List:

- Top #32 Mobile Game Developers of PocketGamer.biz – 2017
- Top #25 Game Makers of PocketGamer.biz – 2019
- State of Survival won Best Simulation Game at Samsung’s Best of Galaxy Store Awards in 2020.
- Top #21 Game Makers of PocketGamer.biz – 2021
- State of Survival wins Best Strategy Game of Huawei’s AppGallery Editor’s Choice Awards 2021
- State of Survival wins Mobile GameDev Awards by GameRefinery for Biggest Evolver and Best Use of IP in a Collaboration Event
- Silver Winner of the Clio Awards in 2022 for its trailer of King of Avalon featuring Orlando Bloom.
- Top 50 Mobile Game Maker #25 – Aug 2023
- May 2024. NYX awards – SEA OF CONQUEST: PIRATE WAR CAPTURES GOLD IN THREE CATEGORIES
- Top 50 Pocket Gamer Mobile Game Maker #19
- Pocket Gamer Awards 2024 – Best Strategy Game of the Year – Sea of Conquest
- In 2025, FunPlus was ranked #24 in the "Top 50 Mobile Game Makers of 2025" list by Pocket Gamer.
- Oct 2025, DC: Dark Legion won two awards at the GamingonPhone Awards 2025: Mobile Game Adaptation of the Year and Mobile Game of the Year.

== Esports ==
FunPlus has an esports division named FunPlus Esports that sponsors several esports teams and leagues around the world. In 2017, FunPlus Esports founded FunPlus Phoenix, a professional esports organization with a League of Legends team competing in China's top league (the LPL), and operates the Pacific Championship Series. During its run from mid-2018 to 2019, the League of Legends SEA Tour was operated by FunPlus Esports.

In 2018 FunPlus Esports, in partnership with Chinese online game developer NetEase, launched the world's first global battle royale pro league, "Rules of Survival Global Series".

In 2019, FunPlus Phoenix won the League Of Legends World Championship in a 3–0 victory over G2 Esports.

In August 2021, FunPlus Phoenix’s mid laner Doinb earned the League of Legends Pro League Most Valuable Player award for the 2021 summer split.

In 2022, FunPlus Phoenix Wins the Chinese Wild Rift League.

== Ventures ==
In 2012, FunPlus received funding in the amount of $13 million in the Series A round from several Silicon Valley investors.

In 2014, FunPlus raised $74 million in a series B funding round led by Orchid Asia Group, GSR Ventures, and Steamboat Ventures.

Since 2014, the company has invested in other game studios and game-related projects globally. Among other ventures, the investment went to the development of the DianDian Interactive game studio.

In 2016, the Company sold its DianDian studio, when all of the investors' shares were purchased by the company and today FunPlus is one of the largest privately held companies in all of gaming and one of the only ones at that size that is completely bootstrapped.

In 2016, the company started a $50 million fund to invest in game startups. The first investment that FunPlus made was in Sirvo Studios.

In July 2016, FunPlus invested an undisclosed amount to Singaporean mobile game developer XII Braves.

In June 2021, FunPlus became one of the investors in seed funding for Drop Fake, which raised $9 million. In July 2021, FunPlus led a series B financing round for Singularity 6. The studio has raised $30 million. In the same year, FunPlus participated in the seed funding round for Gardens Studio, in which it raised $4.5 million.

In 2022, FunPlus invested in ConchShip Games with a 25% stake.
