= Doinb =

South Korean League of Legends player

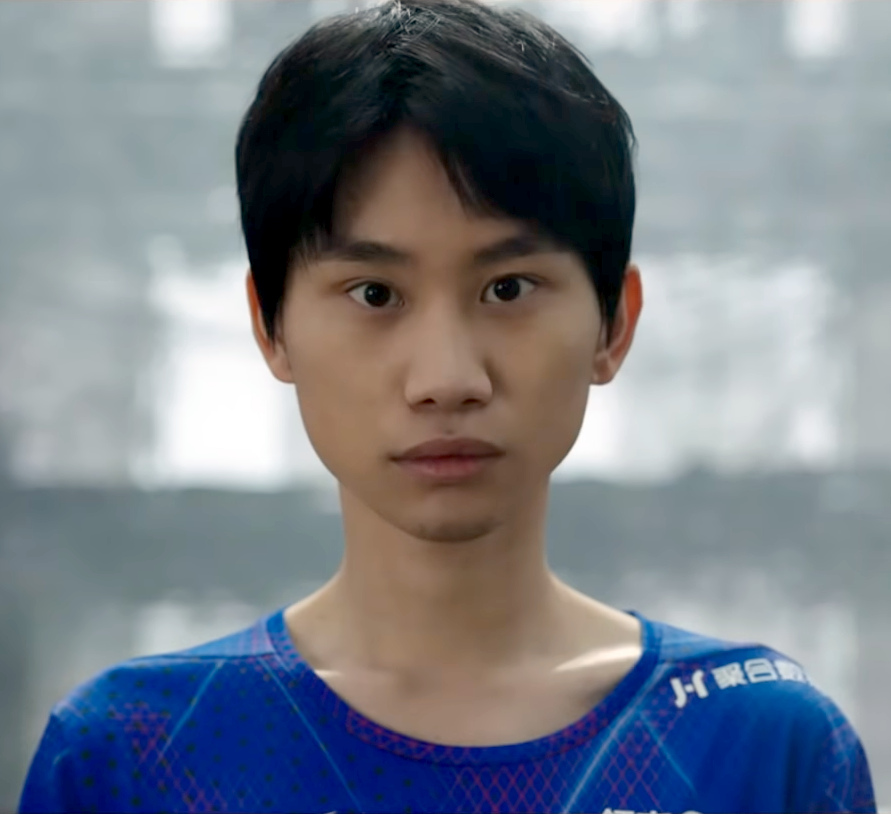
- Kim in 2022

Personal information
- Name: 김태상 (Kim Tae-sang)
- Born: December 30, 1996 (age 29)
- Nationality: South Korean

Career information
- Game: League of Legends
- Playing career: 2015–present
- Role: Mid

Team history
- 2015–2016: Qiao Gu Reapers
- 2016: Newbee
- 2016: Newbee Young
- 2016–2017: Qiao Gu Reapers
- 2017: JD Gaming
- 2017–2018: Rogue Warriors
- 2018–2021: FunPlus Phoenix
- 2021–2022: LNG Esports
- 2025–present: Ninjas in Pyjamas

Career highlights and awards
- World champion (2019); Rift Rivals champion (2018); LPL champion (Summer 2019); 4× LPL All Pro First Team

Kim Tae-sang (Korean: 김태상; born December 30, 1996), better known as Doinb, is a South Korean professional League of Legends player who is the mid laner for Ninjas in Pyjamas. He has spent his entire career in China's League of Legends Pro League (LPL). Doinb was the first player in the LPL to win the title of most valuable player twice; he won the title while playing for Qiao Gu Reapers and FunPlus Phoenix, in 2017 and 2019, respectively. Doinb won his first international title after he and his team swept G2 Esports in the grand finals of the 2019 World Championship.

== Career ==
=== 2015 ===
Doinb began his professional career in 2015 when he was picked up by the Chinese team Qiao Gu Reapers as their starting mid laner. In the Demacia Cup, the Qiao Gu Reapers placed third despite being an LSPL (then secondary league to the LPL) team. After winning the finals of the 2015 Spring LSPL, Doinb won his first championship title, and his team qualified for the LPL. The Qiao Gu Reapers went on to defeat Invictus Gaming in their first LPL semifinal, but finished runner-up after losing to LGD in the final.

=== 2016 ===
In the 2016 LPL spring playoffs, Doinb and his team were defeated by Team WE in the third-place decider match, placing fourth overall. In May 2016, the Qiao Gu Reapers renamed to Newbee and Doinb was transferred to Newbee Young (Newbee's academy team in the LSPL) due to a conflict he had with the team's jungler, Swift. Newbee Young defeated Young Miracles 3–2 in the 2016 LSPL Summer finals, qualifying the team for the LPL and earning Doinb his second LSPL title. Newbee Young rebranded to QG Reapers due to LPL rules afterthefact.

=== 2017 ===
The QG Reapers placed third in the 2017 LPL Spring regular season. However, they were defeated by I May 2–3 in the first round of playoffs. In April Doinb was given the MVP award for the 2017 LPL Spring season. Before the summer season, QG Reapers was purchased by JD Gaming, and Doinb remained on the roster. In the first game of the Demacia Cup, JD Gaming lost to LGD and placed 9th–12th. JD Gaming failed to make the 2017 LPL Summer playoffs after ending with a 6–11 record. In the 2017 National Electronic Sports Tournament finals, JD Gaming lost to Invictus Gaming and finished runner-up. In December 2017, Doinb joined Rogue Warriors. Rogue Warriors lost to Invictus Gaming 1–2 in the 2017 Demacia Championship.

=== 2018 ===
In 2018 Rift Rivals, Doinb and his team won the Rift Rivals championship for the LPL, along with Royal Never Give Up, Edward Gaming and Invictus Gaming. Doinb moved to FunPlus Phoenix in December 2018.

=== 2019 ===
In the 2019 LPL Spring regular season, Doinb and his team FunPlus Phoenix placed first with a 13–2 record. They then lost to JD Gaming in the semifinals but won to the third-place decider match against TOPSPORTS Gaming. For his performance throughout the 2019 LPL Spring season, Doinb was again awarded the MVP title.

In the 2019 LPL Summer Split, FunPlus Phoenix once again finished first in the regular season and automatically qualified for the semifinals. In the semifinals they defeated Bilibili Gaming 3–1, qualifying them for the finals and the 2019 World Championship, as any result in the finals would allow them to qualify (i.e., a victory in the finals would give FunPlus Phoenix the first LPL seed, a loss would award them enough championship points to qualify by having the most). FunPlus Phoenix then defeated three-time champions Royal Never Give Up 3–1 in the finals, securing their first title.

For the main event group stage of the 2019 World Championship, FunPlus Phoenix was placed in Group B along with Splyce, J Team, and GAM Esports. After defeating Splyce in a tiebreaker match, FunPlus Phoenix qualified for the knockout stage as the first seed in their group. In the quarterfinals FunPlus Phoenix defeated Fnatic, which finished runner-up the year prior, and in the semifinals they defeated fellow LPL team and defending world champions Invictus Gaming to advance to the finals. After defeating G2 Esports 3–0 in the finals, Doinb and his team won their first international title and were crowned 2019 Worlds champions.

After playing in the league for five years, Doinb became the first foreigner to acquire LPL residency on December 12, 2019, meaning he would henceforth be considered a domestic player.

=== 2020 ===
In the 2020 LPL Summer Split playoffs, FunPlus Phoenix was eliminated in the first round by Victory Five.

At the 2020 LPL Regional Qualifier for the 2020 World Championship, FunPlus Phoenix was knocked out by Invictus Gaming in a best-of-five match, barring them from the World Championship; he and his teammates would therefore not be defending their 2019 title.

=== 2021 ===
FunPlus Phoenix went 11–5 in the LPL Spring 2021 regular season, finishing fifth and qualifying for playoffs. In playoffs the team reached the grand final, where they were beaten by Royal Never Give Up 3–1. In the summer regular season, they finished first place, going 13–3. In playoffs their first match was a 3–0 sweep over LNG Esports. Their next match, against Team WE, they won 3–0, simultaneously qualifying them for the 2021 World Championship and the LPL Summer grand final. In the latter they were beaten by Edward Gaming 3–1.

At the 2021 World Championship, FunPlus Phoenix started in the Group Stage. Apart from themselves, their group consisted of Rogue, Cloud9, and defending world champions DWG KIA. Along with DWG KIA, FunPlus Phoenix were heavily favored to advance to the Playoffs Stage, but after an initial 2–1 performance, they crumbled in the second round robin and finished 2–5.

Doinb joined LNG Esports in the offseason following the World Championship.

=== 2022 ===
In the LPL Spring 2022 regular season, Doinb—now on LNG Esports—finished 11–5, placing fourth. In playoffs they were knocked out of the tournament in their first match, against Top Esports, who beat them 3–0. They went 8–8 in the Summer regular season, placing lower than before—seventh—but still qualifying for playoffs. Here the team won their first three matches, against Bilibili Gaming, Weibo Gaming, and Victory Five, but were swept 3–0 by JD Gaming in the first-round Upper Bracket and degraded to the first-round Lower Bracket, where they would have to win to advance; they ended up being beaten by Edward Gaming 3–1, ending their Summer Split.

LNG announced the departure of Doinb on 12 November 2022, and he entered free agency. He did not join a team in the offseason, and later clarified that he would be taking a break from professional play, stating that he "lost confidence this year" and was not satisfied with his results in the past two years.

=== 2025 ===
Doinb returned to professional play in 2025, joining Ninjas in Pyjamas for the first split of the season.

== Achievements ==
=== Qiao Gu Reapers ===
- 3rd — 2015 Demacia Cup
- 1st — 2015 Spring LSPL
- 2nd — 2015 Summer LPL
- 4th — 2016 Spring LPL

=== Newbee ===
- 1st — 2016 Summer LSPL
- 5th–8th — 2017 Spring LPL

=== JD Gaming ===
- 2nd — 2017 NEST

=== Rogue Warriors ===
- 1st — 2018 Rift Rivals

=== FunPlus Phoenix ===
- 1st — 2019 Spring LPL regular season
- 3rd — 2019 Spring LPL playoffs
- 1st — 2019 Summer LPL regular season
- 1st — 2019 Summer LPL playoffs
- 1st — 2019 World Championship
- 3rd — 2020 Spring LPL regular season
- 3rd — 2020 Spring LPL playoffs
- 5th – 2021 Spring LPL regular season
- 2nd – 2021 Spring LPL playoffs
- 1st – 2021 Summer LPL regular season
- 2nd – 2021 Summer LPL playoffs

== Individual awards ==
- Best New Player in the LPL (2015)
- 2017 LPL Spring Split MVP
- 2019 LPL Spring Split MVP
- 2021 LPL Summer Split MVP
- 16th player to achieve 1,000 kills in the LPL (February 2019)
- First South Korean to play 300+ games in the LPL (March 2019)

== Personal life ==
Doinb is married to Li Youzi, better known by her in-game name Tang Xiaoyou, and recently now known as Umi Lee; he first met her when he was 18-years-old and still a new player in the LPL. At the time, Li was a professional player and official commentator for the online fighting game Dungeon Fighter Online. Doinb and Li began dating in 2015, but they did not publicly reveal their relationship until 2016. On Doinb's 22nd birthday he proposed to Li, who accepted. On September 8, 2022, Doinb announced that he and Li were expecting their first child; Li announced that she had given birth in February 2023.
