= Cailin Russo =

American musician and model

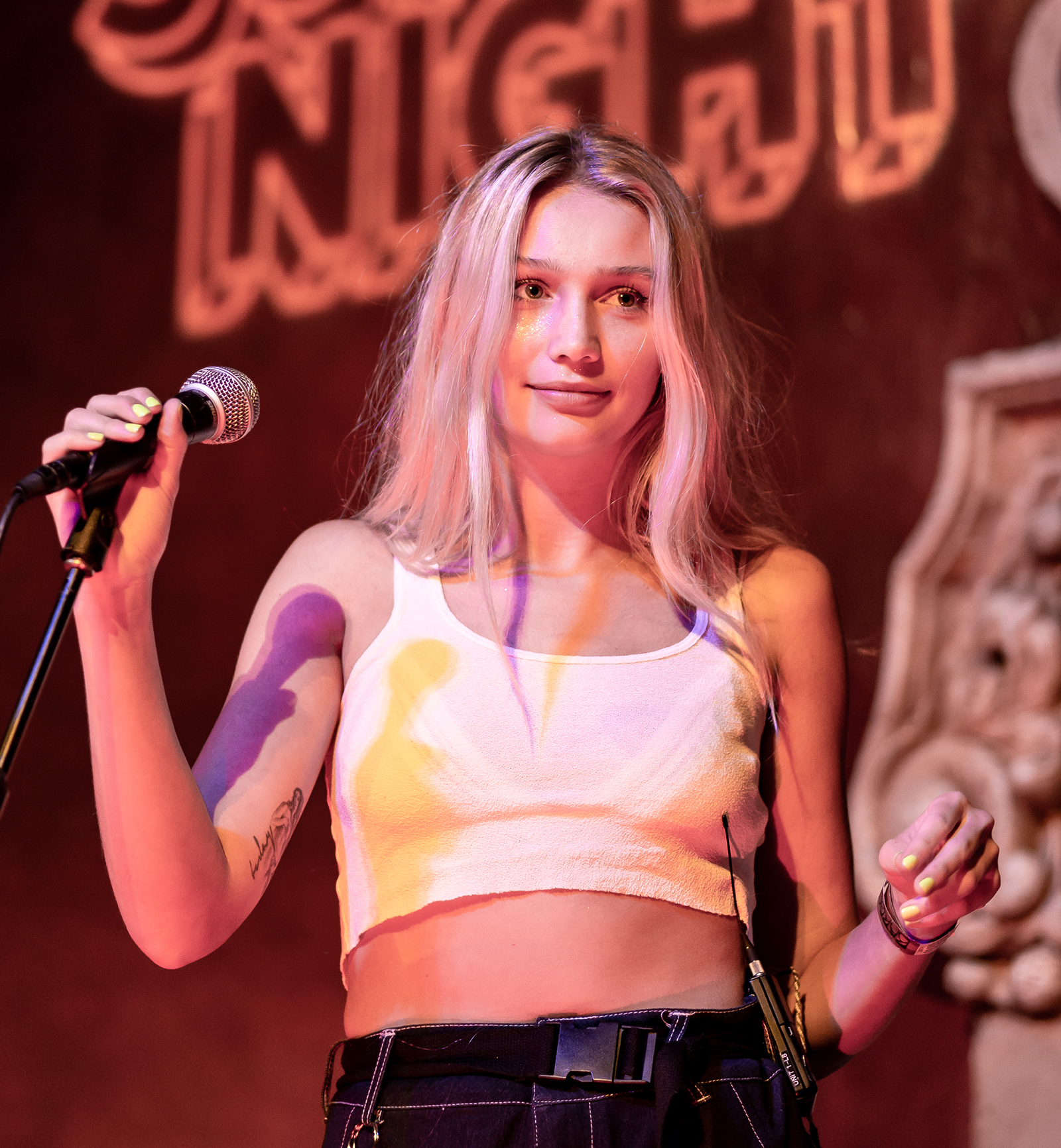
- Born: San Diego, California
- Occupations: Musician; model
- Father: Scott Russo

Cailin Russo is an American model, singer-songwriter and recording artist. She gained fame through her appearances in the Justin Bieber music videos for "All That Matters" and "Confident", as well as her featured vocals on the 2019 League of Legends World Championship promotional song "Phoenix".

== Early life ==
Russo was born to rock musician Scott Russo, lead vocalist of the band Unwritten Law, and Jodi Russo, and was raised in the Rancho Penasquitos neighborhood of San Diego, California. She is the subject of Unwritten Law's 1998 song "Cailin".

== Career ==
Russo began modeling "accidentally". She has modeled for brands such as Forever 21, Wildfox Couture, Ocean Pacific, PacSun, American Apparel, Free People, and Brandy Melville. Russo was cast as Justin Bieber's love interest in the music videos "All That Matters" and "Confident" by a family friend. Russo later signed with a label and started her music career.

=== Music ===
Russo is the lead singer of her eponymous band Russo (stylized in all caps). In 2018, she released an EP, House with a Pool, and has since released two singles: "Phoenix" and "Love No More". She cites Missy Elliott, OutKast, Gorillaz, Gwen Stefani, Bill Withers, Lauryn Hill, and Stevie Wonder as influences. Russo's sound has been described as "grunge-influenced punk rock, with a pinch of pop thrown in for good measure". They have toured with Jessie Ware and Madison Beer.

She collaborated with Chrissy Costanza in the song "Phoenix" that was made for the League of Legends World Championship 2019. The collaboration has gained over 140 million streams.

In 2022, Russo became a Juno-nominated artist for her work on Kanye West’s song "Hurricane".

Russo's song "Bad Things" was featured in the end credits of Canadian television show Heated Rivalry's season 1 finale, "The Cottage".
