= FunPlus Phoenix =

Chinese esports organization

- Nickname: "Little Phoenix" (小凤凰)
- Short name: FPX
- Divisions: Counter-Strike: Global Offensive; Fortnite Battle Royale; PlayerUnknown's Battlegrounds; Valorant; League of Legends (2018–2025)
- Founded: 20 December 2017
- League: League of Legends Pro League (2018–2025)
- Based in: Beijing, China
- CEO: Yang "Emily" Yan
- Championships: 1× World Championship (LoL, 2019); 1× VCT Masters (Valorant, 2022 Stage 2)
- League titles: 1× LPL (LoL, Summer 2019); 1× VCT Challenger EMEA (Valorant, 2022 Stage 1)
- Parent group: FunPlus

FunPlus Phoenix (FPX) is a Chinese professional esports organization owned by video game developer FunPlus. It has teams competing in Counter-Strike: Global Offensive, Fortnite Battle Royale, PlayerUnknown's Battlegrounds, and Valorant. It was founded on 20 December 2017 following FunPlus' acquisition of a spot in the League of Legends Pro League (LPL), the top level of professional League of Legends in China. On 10 November 2019, FPX's League of Legends team won the 2019 League of Legends World Championship after sweeping G2 Esports in the grand finals.

== League of Legends ==
=== History ===
On 20 December 2017, FunPlus' esports division announced the creation of FPX and its acquisition of a spot in the League of Legends Pro League (LPL). FPX's inaugural roster consisted of top laner Kim "GimGoon" Han-saem, jungler Hu "Pepper" Zhiwei, mid laner Feng "bing" Jinwei, bot laner Lin "Lwx" Weixiang, and support Liu "Crisp" Qingsong. The team's first tournament was the 2017 Demacia Championship, which they placed ninth to fifteenth after losing to Team WE in the third and final round of Group E.

For the 2018 LPL Spring regular season, FPX was placed in the league's western conference. Despite adding veteran mid laner Yu "Cool" Jiajun, FPX finished fifth in their conference with a 9–10 record and did not qualify for playoffs. Chen "Alex" Yu-ming replaced Pepper as the team's primary jungler for the 2018 LPL Summer regular season. FPX finished fourth in their conference with an 8–11 record, qualifying for playoffs as one of the bottom seeds. They were promptly defeated by JD Gaming in the first round.

In preparation for the 2019 LPL Spring regular season, FPX revamped their roster, adding jungler Gao "Tian" Tianliang and veteran mid laner Kim "Doinb" Tae-sang. The team massively improved, finishing first in the regular season with a 13–2 record and getting an automatic bye to the semifinals. However, in an upset result, FPX lost 2–3 to JD Gaming in the semifinals, and advanced to the third place decider match rather than the finals. FPX defeated Topsports Gaming 3–1 in the third place decider match.

Going into the 2019 LPL Summer Split without making any roster changes, FPX once again finished first in the regular season and automatically qualified for the semifinals. In the semifinals FPX defeated Bilibili Gaming 3–1, qualifying them for the finals and the 2019 World Championship, as any result would have sent FPX to the World Championship (i.e., a victory in the finals would automatically qualify FPX as the first LPL seed, a loss would award them enough championship points to qualify as the second LPL seed). FPX then defeated three-time champions Royal Never Give Up 3–1 in the finals, securing their first title.

For the main event group stage of the 2019 World Championship, FPX was placed in Group B along with Splyce, J Team, and GAM Esports. After defeating Splyce in a tiebreaker match, FPX qualified for the knockout stage as the first seed in their group. In the quarterfinals FPX defeated Fnatic, which finished runner-up the year prior, and in the semifinals FPX defeated fellow LPL team and defending world champions Invictus Gaming to advance to the finals. FPX then swept G2 Esports 3–0 in the finals to win their first international title and the LPL's second World Championship title.

On 30 November 2019, FPX won the award for "best team" at the 2019 China LoL of the Year Awards, held during the LPL All-Star event. In preparation for the 2020 spring season, several additions were made to FPX's roster: Two-time LCK champion Kim "Khan" Dong-ha joined from SKT T1, while three players were promoted from FPX's academy team.

On 17 November 2025, FPX and the LPL announced that FPX was withdrawing from the LPL.

=== Current roster ===
FunPlus Phoenix League of Legends roster
Players
Coaches

Role	Handle	Name	Nationality
Top	Xiaolaohu	Ping Xiaohu	China
Jungle	milkyway	Cai Zijun	China
Jungle	Moyan	Wang Xin	China
Mid	Care	Yang Jie	China
Bot	Deokdam	Seo Dae-gil	South Korea
Support	Life	Kim Jeong-min	South Korea

Head coach

Yeon "Sin" Hyeong-mo

Assistant coach(es)

Chen "Mouse" Yu-Hao
Kim "ikRyong" Geun-hyeong

Legend:
- (I) Inactive
- (S) Suspended
- Substitute
- (injured) Injury / Illness

Roster updated 8 February 2024.

=== Tournament results ===
Placement	Event	Final result (W–L)
9th–15th	2017 Demacia Championship	1–2 (against Team WE)
5th	2018 LPL Spring Split (West)	10–9
4th	2018 LPL Summer Split (West)	13–6
7th–8th	2018 LPL Summer Playoffs	1–3 (against JD Gaming)
NQ	NEST 2018 Qualifiers	1–2 (against Team WE)
1st	2019 LPL Spring Split	13–2
3rd	2019 LPL Spring Playoffs	3–1 (against Topsports Gaming)
9th–16th	NEST 2019	0–3 (against SinoDragon Gaming)
2nd	Rift Rivals 2019 LCK-LPL-LMS-VCS	1–3 (against LCK)
1st	2019 LPL Summer Split	14–1
1st	2019 LPL Summer Playoffs	3–1 (against Royal Never Give Up)
1st	2019 World Championship	3–0 (against G2 Esports)
3rd	2020 LPL Spring Split	12–4
3rd	2020 LPL Spring Playoffs	3–0 (against Invictus Gaming)
2nd	2020 Mid-Season Cup	1–3 (against Top Esports)
8th	2020 LPL Summer Split	9–7
7th–8th	2020 LPL Summer Playoffs	1–3 (against Victory Five)
4th	2020 LPL Regional Finals	2–3 (against Invictus Gaming)
4th	NEST 2020	1–2 (against Edward Gaming)
5th–8th	2020 Demacia Cup	0–3 (against Top Esports)
5th	2021 LPL Spring Split	11–5
2nd	2021 LPL Spring Playoffs	1–3 (against Royal Never Give Up)
1st	2021 LPL Summer Split	13-3
2nd	2021 LPL Summer Playoffs	1–3 (against Edward Gaming)

== Counter-Strike: Global Offensive ==
=== History ===
On 15 March 2020, FPX announced they had signed the former Danish roster of Heroic, consisting of Marco "Snappi" Pfeiffer, Casper "cadiaN" Møller, Johannes "b0RUP" Borup, Patrick "es3tag" Hansen, and Martin "Stavn" Lund, with Frederik "LOMME" Nielsen as their coach. The team played a single match in Phase 1 of the tournament before Patrick "es3tag" Hansen left the team to join Astralis. As a result of this, they had to forfeit the second match. For Phase 2, the organization fielded North American team Bad News Bears, consisting of Michael "dapr" Gulino, Peter "ptr" Gurney, Jonathan "Jonji" Carey, Mitch "mitch" Semago, and Austin "crashies" Roberts. With 65 points, FPX advanced to the quarterfinals. After losing the first match to MAD Lions, the team fell to the lower bracket, where they played against Gen.G. Despite an outstanding performance by the team's in-game leader Michael "dapr" Gulino, FPX lost the match and was eliminated from the tournament. This roster only lasted for the inaugural season of the Flashpoint league.

On 25 September 2020, FPX signed Serbian Petar "peca" Marković, who will be in charge of building the organization's new CS:GO team and split his duties between managing its CS:GO and VALORANT divisions.

On 25 January 2021, FPX confirmed that they signed the quartet of the former Godsent roster. The next day their fifth player Chris "ChrisJ" de Jong was announced.

On 3 March 2021, HLTV.org reported that chrisJ would leave from the current FPX-roster, being replaced by the former ENCE eSports player, Miikka "suNny" Kemppi.

On 5 November 2021, FPX announced that they would be discontinuing their Counter-Strike division, with the last 2 players parting ways with the organization in April of 2022.

=== Final roster ===
FunPlus Phoenix CS:GO roster
Players
Coaches

Handle	Name	Nationality
zehN	Linjala, Jesse	Finland
STYKO	Styk, Martin	Slovakia
maden	Bošković, Pavle	Montenegro
farlig	Jensen, Asger	Denmark
emi	Vuković, Luka	Serbia

Head coach

Jonatan "devilwalk" Lundberg

Legend:
- (I) Inactive
- (S) Suspended
- Substitute
- (injured) Injury / Illness

Latest roster transaction: 18 October 2021.

=== Tournament results ===
Placement	Event	Final result (W–L)
7th–8th	Flashpoint 1	0–2 (against Gen.G)
2nd	DreamHack Open January 2021 Europe	0–3 (against Team Spirit)

== Valorant ==
=== History ===
FPX built a Valorant team from CIS to compete in EMEA. They had won VCT 2022 stage 1 EMEA Challengers to qualify the 2022 VCT: Stage 1 Masters in Reykjavík, but could not attend due to travel restrictions on their Russian and Ukrainian players related to the 2022 Russian invasion of Ukraine and COVID-19 regulations.

At the 2022 VCT: Stage 2 Masters in Copenhagen, FPX was forced to play with Alliance player SEIDER after SUYGETSU was unable to travel from Russia to Denmark due to visa issues. After three matches played, SUYGETSU got his visa approved and made his way into Denmark. With the complete starting roster, FPX went on to win the tournament after beating APAC side Paper Rex 3–2, getting its first major win at Valorant.

After the organization's application to be part of the Valorant Champions Tour's new franchise system was denied in 2022, it released its CIS roster and set up a new team in China.

=== Current roster ===
FunPlus Phoenix Valorant roster
Players
Coaches
S

Handle	Name	Nationality
AAAAY	Zhang, Yang	China
sScary	Matarat, Nutchapon	Thailand
Setrod	Ou, Taigeng	Taiwan
BerLIN	Chang, Po-Lin	Taiwan
XII (S)	Chen, Yen-hsiang	Taiwan
Life2	Qu, DongHao	China

Head coach

Nikola "LEGIJA" Ninić

Assistant coach(es)

Yao "YorkMonster" Kun

Legend:
- (I) Inactive
- (S) Suspended
- Substitute
- (injured) Injury / Illness

=== Tournament results ===
Placement	Event	Final result (W–L)
4th	2022 Valorant Champions	0–2 (against DRX)
1st	2022 Valorant Champions Tour: Stage 2 Masters	3–2 (against Paper Rex)
1st	24cyber ORCs Cup	2–0 (against One Breath)
2nd	BLAST Valorant Twitch Invitational	2–3 (against G2 Esports)
3rd–4th	VALORANT First-Strike Europe	1–2 (against Fnatic)

== Sponsorships ==
FPX is sponsored by BMW, Herman Miller, Huya Live, OPPO, PUMA, Oish, Cool Fish, and Bixin.

Awards and achievements
Preceded by Invictus Gaming	League of Legends World Championship winner 2019; With: GimGoon, Tian, Doinb, Lwx, Crisp, and WarHorse (coach)	Succeeded by DAMWON Gaming
Preceded by Invictus Gaming	League of Legends Pro League winner Summer 2019; With: GimGoon, Tian, Doinb, Lwx, Crisp, and WarHorse (coach)	Succeeded by JD Gaming
Preceded by Optic Gaming	Valorant Masters winner 2022 Stage 2: Copenhagen; With: ANGE1, Shao, Zyppan, SUYGETSU, ardiis, SEIDER, and d00mbr0s (coach)	Succeeded by TBD
