= The Village School for Children =

Private school in New Jersey, United States

Coordinates: 41.012638°N 74.129335°W

Information
- Gender: Mixed
- Age: 18 months to 14 years
- Enrollment: 235 (2009-2010)

The Village School is an independent coeducational day school, serving students from 18 months to 14 years, located in the Borough of Waldwick, in Bergen County, New Jersey, United States. The Village School is a Montessori school for children from toddler through middle school. Its programs are based on the fundamental philosophy of Dr. Maria Montessori. It is one of the Montessori schools in New Jersey serving students up to 15 years of age.

As of the 2009–2010 school year, the school served 235 students, with 105 in pre-school and 129 in its Kindergarten through eighth grade program. The school had 24 students in kindergarten, about 16 students per class in grades 1–3, and about 19 students per class in grades 4–8.

The Village School is the New Jersey satellite school for the Center for Montessori Teacher Education, in which individuals in North Jersey are trained as instructors in the Montessori pedagogical methodology. Several teachers at the Village School have participated in this program as mentor teachers.

== Accreditation ==
The Village School is accredited by the American Montessori Society and by the Middle States Association of Colleges and Schools since 1993. The school is a member of the New Jersey Association of Independent Schools.

== History ==
The Village School was founded by Marilyn Larkin and Lynne Wasserman in 1977 in Ridgewood. Since its founding, the School expanded to several sites in Ridgewood, before consolidating these sites in Glen Rock. After an interim year in Ridgewood, the school relocated to its current School-owned facility in Waldwick during the summer of 2002, a site it purchased from Berkeley College.
