= Past Lives (Against the Current album) =

Studio album by Against the Current
- Released: September 28, 2018
- Length: 35:49
- Labels: Fueled by Ramen; Warner/Chappell Music
- Producers: Andrew Goldstein; Tommy English; Big Taste

Against the Current chronology
In Our Bones (2016)	Past Lives (2018)	Fever (2021)

Past Lives is the second studio album by American pop rock band Against the Current. The album was released on September 28, 2018.

== Track listing ==
Past Lives track listing
No.	Title	Writer(s)	Length
1.	"Strangers Again"	Declan Traynor: Andrew Goldstein; Nick Long	3:42
2.	"The Fuss"	Thomas Schleiter; Trent Dabbs	2:50
3.	"I Like the Way"	Andrew Goldstein; Nolan Sipe	3:23
4.	"Personal"	Andrew Goldstein; Sarah Hudson	3:24
5.	"Voices"	Andrew Goldstein; Jesse St. John; Sarah Hudson	3:24
6.	"Scream"	Allie Hughes; Jesse St. John; Leroy Clampitt; Thomas Schleiter	3:00
7.	"Almost Forgot"	Andrew Goldstein; Brittany Amaradio; Steph Jones	3:28
8.	"P.A.T.T."	Andrew Goldstein; Jessica Karpov; Nolan Sipe	2:33
9.	"Friendly Reminder"	Andrew Goldstein; Jesse St. John	3:09
10.	"Come Alive"	Maika Maile; Michael Ferri	3:24
11.	"Sweet Surrender"	Declan Traynor: Allison Veltz; Thomas Schleiter	3:32
Total length:			35:49

Japanese version bonus tracks
No.	Title	Length
12.	"NIJI"	5:00
13.	"Eyes Like Guns"	3:19
Total length:		43:09

== Charts ==
JPN	UK
185	86
