= Guild Esports =

British esports company

Guild Esports & Gaming
- Type: Private
- Industry: Esports
- Founded: September 3, 2019
- Defunct: August 21, 2025
- Fate: Financial challenges
- Headquarters: 2 Chance Street, Shoreditch, London, E1 6JT, United Kingdom
- Key people: Managing Director: Hari Sandhu; Managing Director: Gary Ladrido
- Owner: DCB Sports
- Website: Official website

Guild Esports & Gaming LTD (formerly The Lords eSports PLC, Guild Esports PLC) was a United Kingdom-based professional esports company founded in 2019. The organisation was the first esports firm to be publicly traded in the United Kingdom, before being fully acquired by US-based sports company DCB Sports in October 2024, and delisting from the London Stock Exchange. The company closed in August 2025 citing "financial challenges and the current economic climate" as the reasoning behind their decision.

Guild had competitive teams in titles including Rocket League, Valorant, Fortnite, FC 25, Sim Racing (Rennsport, iRacing) and PUBG Mobile. In addition to its competitive teams, Guild operated as a creative agency with an in-house studio, delivering campaigns that help brands reach a gaming audience. Past collaborations include campaigns for the Wicked movie, Karate Kid Legends, and Wild Robot. Guild also ran a Women in Gaming initiative with Sky called The Lobby - a mission to create more opportunities for women in the gaming community.

== History ==
Guild Esports was incorporated on 3 September 2019 under the name The Lords eSports PLC. The company launched publicly in 2020 and listed on the London Stock Exchange (LSE), raising £20 million in its IPO.

In 2022, Guild signed a 10-year lease on a 9,831 sq ft facility in Shoreditch, London, which became their official HQ and training facility.

In 2024, Guild joined the Esports World Cup’s Club Support Program, receiving a stipend to expand into multiple titles. That same year, Guild acquired Encore and a stake in Ginx TV, further expanding its media presence.

In October 2024, Guild Esports was acquired by DCB Sports, a US-based sports group, transitioning from a publicly traded company to a private one.

The company closed in August 2025 citing "financial challenges and the current economic climate" as the reasoning behind their decision.

== Esports ==
In November 2020, Guild Esports created their Fortnite division. In March 2021, the team won the Fortnite Champion Series European Grand Finals. The next month, the organisation's Rocket League team won the Rocket League Championship Series EU Spring Regional.

Guild Esports would acquire Bad News Eagles, a Kosovar-majority unsigned Counter-Strike 2 roster who had made the Antwerp, Rio and Paris Majors, in November 2023, rebranding them as Guild Eagles. However, on 24 May 2024, Guild released the team.

As the Esports World Cup Foundation Club Support Program gave Guild a one-time stipend if they wished to enter new esports, particularly those with a presence at the Esports World Cup itself, Guild Esports would sign rosters in Street Fighter 6 in February, Rennsport (giving them entry into the ESL R1 sim racing league) and Tekken 8 in May, and Apex Legends (marking their return after two years), Call of Duty: Warzone, and Mobile Legends: Bang Bang (in a partnership with R8 Esports focusing on their female roster) in June of 2024, whilst also expanding their Fortnite division in the process. Guild's Apex roster announcement on 13 June drew criticism for using AI-generated artworks of the game's characters.

== Ownership and Media Assets ==
Guild Esports was fully owned by DCB Sports. In 2024, Guild acquired:

- A stake in Ginx TV, a UK-based gaming and esports television channel.
- Encore, a Los Angeles-based fan engagement and analytics platform.
