= 2019 League of Legends World Championship =

Esports tournament held in Europe

League of Legends World Championship
- 2019

Tournament information
- Sport: League of Legends
- Location: France; Germany; Spain
- Dates: October 2–November 10
- Administrator: Riot Games
- Tournament format(s): 12 team double round-robin play-in stage 16 team double round-robin group stage 8 team single-elimination bracket
- Venues: 4 (in 3 host cities): LEC Studio (Berlin, Play-in stage); Verti Music Hall (Berlin, Main group stage); Palacio Vistalegre (Madrid, Quarterfinals & Semifinals); AccorHotels Arena (Paris, Finals)
- Teams: 24

Final positions
- Champion: FunPlus Phoenix
- Runner-up: G2 Esports

Tournament statistics
- Attendance: Peak viewership: 43,982,055
- MVP: Gao "Tian" Tianliang (FunPlus Phoenix)

The 2019 League of Legends World Championship was an esports tournament for the multiplayer online battle arena video game League of Legends. It was the ninth iteration of the League of Legends World Championship, an annual international tournament organized by the game's developer, Riot Games. It was held from October 2, 2019, to November 10, 2019, in Berlin, Madrid and Paris. Twenty four teams from 13 regions qualified for the tournament based on their placement in regional circuits such as those in China, Europe, North America, South Korea and Taiwan/Hong Kong/Macau with twelve of those teams having to reach the main event via a play-in stage.

"Phoenix" was the tournament's theme song, put together by Chrissy Costanza and Cailin Russo, while Blanke, Carpenter Brut, and 1788-L produced their own remix versions of "Phoenix". A virtual rap group named "True Damage" was unveiled by Riot Games during the ceremony, with Soyeon from (G)I-dle, Duckwrth, Thutmose, Keke Palmer and Becky G representing the group as its human counterpart and in the live performance of their debut song, "Giants", in the finals.

The final was played on 10 November 2019 between FunPlus Phoenix from China's League of Legends Pro League (LPL), and G2 Esports from Europe's League of Legends European Championship (LEC). There, FunPlus Phoenix defeated G2 Esports with a 3–0 scoreline, as their victory marked the second consecutive time a team from the LPL had won the world championship. If successful, G2 Esports would have become the first team to complete the "Golden Road". (Note: When a team wins all four major League of Legends titles in a single season (Spring and Summer domestic titles, Mid-Season Invitational and the World Championship).)

== Qualified teams ==
Based on the results of the Mid-Season Invitational and the World Championship in the year prior, with the 2018 MSI victory of Royal Never Give Up and 2018 Worlds victory of Invictus Gaming, the third seed team from China (LPL) will start in the group stage, replacing the third seed team from South Korea (LCK) that will now instead begin in the play-in stage. Due to the merger of Latin America North's and Latin America South's professional leagues into a single league (LLA) and the results of the 2019 Mid-Season Invitational, Vietnam (VCS) will have a direct spot in the group stage for the summer champions and an additional spot in the play-in stage for the summer runner-up, the same format used in 2017 Worlds. The summer champions of Taiwan/Hong Kong/Macau (LMS) have also been dropped to pool #2.

Region	League	Path	Team	ID	Pool
Starting in the main event's group stage
China	LPL	Summer Champion	FunPlus Phoenix	FPX	1
China	LPL	Most Championship Points	Royal Never Give Up	RNG	2
China	LPL	Regional Finals Winner	Invictus Gaming	IG	2
Europe	LEC	Summer Champion	G2 Esports	G2	1
Europe	LEC	Regional Finals Winner	Fnatic	FNC	2
North America	LCS	Summer Champion	Team Liquid	TL	1
North America	LCS	Most Championship Points	Cloud9	C9	2
South Korea	LCK	Summer Champion	SK Telecom T1	SKT	1
South Korea	LCK	Most Championship Points	Griffin	GRF	2
TW/HK/MO	LMS	Summer Champion	J Team	JT	2
TW/HK/MO	LMS	Most Championship Points	ahq e-Sports Club	AHQ	2
Vietnam	VCS	Summer Champion	GAM Esports	GAM	2
Starting in the play-in stage
Europe	LEC	Regional Finals Runner-up	Splyce	SPY	1
North America	LCS	Regional Finals Winner	Clutch Gaming	CG	1
South Korea	LCK	Regional Finals Winner	Damwon Gaming	DWG	1
TW/HK/MO	LMS	Regional Finals Winner	Hong Kong Attitude	HKA	1
Vietnam	VCS	Summer Runner-up	Lowkey Esports	LK	2
CIS	LCL	Summer Champion	Unicorns of Love	UOL	2
Latin America	LLA	Summer Champion	Isurus Gaming	ISG	2
Turkey	TCL	Summer Champion	Royal Youth	RYL	2
Brazil	CBLOL	Summer Champion	Flamengo eSports	FLA	3
Japan	LJL	Summer Champion	DetonatioN FocusMe	DFM	3
Oceania	OPL	Summer Champion	Mammoth	MMM	3
Southeast Asia	LST	Summer Champion	MEGA Esports	MG	3

== Venues ==
Berlin, Madrid, Paris were the three cities chosen to host the competition.

Berlin, Germany		Madrid, Spain	Paris, France
Play-in Stage	Main Group Stage	Quarterfinals & Semifinals	Finals
LEC Studio	Verti Music Hall	Palacio Vistalegre	AccorHotels Arena
Capacity: 174	Capacity: 2,250	Capacity: 15,000	Capacity: 20,300
2019 League of Legends World Championship is located in Germany		2019 League of Legends World Championship is located in Spain	2019 League of Legends World Championship is located in France

== Play-in stage ==
- Venue: LEC Studio, Berlin, Germany.

=== Groups ===
The group stage took place from 2 to 5 October, with matches beginning at 13:00 CEST (UTC+02:00) for the first leg and 12:00 for the second. Twelve teams were drawn into four groups of three, with each group playing a double round-robin format and all matches contested as best-of-one. When teams finished with identical win–loss and head-to-head records, a tiebreaker match was held to determine first or second place. The top two teams from each group advanced to the second round, while the third-place team was eliminated.

Group A

Pos	Team	Pld	W	L	PCT	Qualification
1	Clutch Gaming	5	3	2	.600	Advance to play-in knockouts
2	Unicorns of Love	6	3	3	.500	Advance to play-in knockouts
3	Mammoth	5	2	3	.400	

Source: LoL Esports
Rules for classification: 1) Winning percentage; 2) Head-to-head record 3) Tiebreaker match(es); 4) Total game victory time (Note: The total amount of time it took a team to win their games against all other teams in the tiebreaker)

Group B

Pos	Team	Pld	W	L	PCT	Qualification
1	Splyce	4	3	1	.750	Advance to play-in knockouts
2	Isurus Gaming	4	2	2	.500	Advance to play-in knockouts
3	DetonatioN FocusMe	4	1	3	.250	

Source: LoL Esports
Rules for classification: 1) Winning percentage; 2) Head-to-head record 3) Tiebreaker match(es); 4) Total game victory time

Group C

Pos	Team	Pld	W	L	PCT	Qualification
1	Hong Kong Attitude	4	3	1	.750	Advance to play-in knockouts
2	Lowkey Esports	4	2	2	.500	Advance to play-in knockouts
3	MEGA Esports	4	1	3	.250	

Source: LoL Esports
Rules for classification: 1) Winning percentage; 2) Head-to-head record 3) Tiebreaker match(es); 4) Total game victory time

Group D

Pos	Team	Pld	W	L	PCT	Qualification
1	Damwon Gaming	4	4	0	1.000	Advance to play-in knockouts
2	Royal Youth	5	2	3	.400	Advance to play-in knockouts
3	Flamengo eSports	5	1	4	.200	

Source: LoL Esports
Rules for classification: 1) Winning percentage; 2) Head-to-head record 3) Tiebreaker match(es); 4) Total game victory time

=== Knockouts ===
- Eight teams are drawn randomly into a single-elimination match, with first-place teams of each group facing second-place teams of another group.
- All matches are best-of-five.
- The first-place team chooses the side for all odd-numbered games, while the second-place team chooses the side of even-numbered games.
- The winner advances to the main event group stage as pool #3.

Round 1
October 7, 13:00 CEST
D1	Damwon Gaming	3
C2	Lowkey Esports	1
October 7, 18:00 CEST
A1	Clutch Gaming	3
D2	Royal Bandits	0
October 8, 13:00 CEST
C1	Hong Kong Attitude	3
B2	Isurus Gaming	1
October 8, 18:00 CEST
B1	Splyce	3
A2	Unicorns of Love	2

Source: Dot Esports

== Group stage ==
The group stage was held at the Verti Music Hall in Berlin from 12 to 20 October. Sixteen teams were drawn into four groups of four, with teams from the same region not permitted to be placed in the same group. The stage was played in a double round-robin format, with all matches contested as best-of-one. In cases where teams finished with identical win–loss and head-to-head records, a tiebreaker match was held to determine first or second place. The top two teams from each group advanced to the knockout stage, while the bottom two were eliminated.

Group A

Pos	Team	Pld	W	L	PCT	Qualification
1	Griffin	6	5	1	.833	Advance to knockouts
2	G2 Esports	6	5	1	.833	Advance to knockouts
3	Cloud9	6	2	4	.333	
4	Hong Kong Attitude	6	0	6	.000	

Source: Dot Esports
Rules for classification: 1) Winning percentage; 2) Head-to-head record

Group B

Pos	Team	Pld	W	L	PCT	Qualification
1	FunPlus Phoenix	6	4	2	.667	Advance to knockouts
2	Splyce	6	4	2	.667	Advance to knockouts
3	J Team	6	3	3	.500	
4	GAM Esports	6	1	5	.167	

Source: Dot Esports
Rules for classification: 1) Winning percentage; 2) Head-to-head record

Group C

Pos	Team	Pld	W	L	PCT	Qualification
1	SK Telecom T1	6	5	1	.833	Advance to knockouts
2	Fnatic	6	4	2	.667	Advance to knockouts
3	Royal Never Give Up	6	3	3	.500	
4	Clutch Gaming	6	0	6	.000	

Source: Dot Esports
Rules for classification: 1) Winning percentage; 2) Head-to-head record

Group D

Pos	Team	Pld	W	L	PCT	Qualification
1	Damwon Gaming	6	5	1	.833	Advance to knockouts
2	Invictus Gaming	6	4	2	.667	Advance to knockouts
3	Team Liquid	6	3	3	.500	
4	ahq Esports Club	6	0	6	.000	

Source: Dot Esports
Rules for classification: 1) Winning percentage; 2) Head-to-head record

== Knockout stage ==
The knockout stage featured eight teams drawn into a single-elimination bracket. All matches were contested as best-of-five series. Each first-place team from the group stage was matched against a second-place team from a different group. The first-place team selected the side for all odd-numbered games, while the second-place team chose the side for even-numbered games. Teams that had advanced from the same group were placed on opposite sides of the bracket, ensuring that they could not meet until the final.

Quarterfinals
October 26 – Madrid
A1	Griffin	1
D2	Invictus Gaming	3
October 26 – Madrid
B1	FunPlus Phoenix	3
C2	Fnatic	1
October 27 – Madrid
C1	SK Telecom T1	3
B2	Splyce	1
October 27 – Madrid
D1	Damwon Gaming	1
A2	G2 Esports	3

Semifinals
November 2 – Madrid
D2	Invictus Gaming	1
B1	FunPlus Phoenix	3
November 3 – Madrid
C1	SK Telecom T1	1
A2	G2 Esports	3

Final
November 10 – Paris
B1	FunPlus Phoenix	3
A2	G2 Esports	0

=== Quarterfinals ===
Quarterfinals	October 26	Griffin	1	–	3	Invictus Gaming	Madrid, Spain
		Source					Palacio Vistalegre
		0	Game 1			1	
		0	Game 2			1	
		1	Game 3			0	
		0	Game 4			1	

Quarterfinals	October 26	FunPlus Phoenix	3	–	1	Fnatic	Madrid, Spain
		Source					Palacio Vistalegre
		1	Game 1			0	
		1	Game 2			0	
		0	Game 3			1	
		1	Game 4			0	

Quarterfinals	October 27	SK Telecom T1	3	–	1	Splyce	Madrid, Spain
		Source					Palacio Vistalegre
		1	Game 1			0	
		1	Game 2			0	
		0	Game 3			1	
		1	Game 4			0	

Quarterfinals	October 27	Damwon Gaming	1	–	3	G2 Esports	Madrid, Spain
		Source					Palacio Vistalegre
		0	Game 1			1	
		1	Game 2			0	
		0	Game 3			1	
		0	Game 4			1	

=== Semifinals ===
Semifinals	November 3	Invictus Gaming	1	–	3	FunPlus Phoenix	Madrid, Spain
		Source					Palacio Vistalegre
		0	Game 1			1	
		1	Game 2			0	
		0	Game 3			1	
		0	Game 4			1	

Semifinals	November 3	G2 Esports	3	–	1	SK Telecom T1	Madrid, Spain
		Source					Palacio Vistalegre
		1	Game 1			0	
		0	Game 2			1	
		1	Game 3			0	
		1	Game 4			0	

=== Final ===
Final	November 10	FunPlus Phoenix	3	–	0	G2 Esports	Paris, France
		Source					AccorHotels Arena
		1	Game 1			0	
		1	Game 2			0	
		1	Game 3			0	

== Ranking ==
=== Team ranking ===
- (*) Not include tie-break games.

Place	Region	Team	PS1	PS2	GS	QF	SF	Finals	Prize (%)	Prize (USD)
1st	LPL	FunPlus Phoenix*			4–2	3–1	3–1	3–0	37.5%	$834,375
2nd	LEC	G2 Esports*			5–1	3–1	3–1	0–3	13.5%	$300,375
3rd–4th	LCK	SK Telecom T1			5–1	3–1	1–3		7%	$155,750
3rd–4th	LPL	Invictus Gaming			4–2	3–1	1–3		7%	$155,750
5th–8th	LCK	Damwon Gaming	4–0	3–1	5–1	1–3			4%	$89,000
5th–8th	LCK	Griffin*			5–1	1–3			4%	$89,000
5th–8th	LEC	Splyce*	3–1	3–2	4–2	1–3			4%	$89,000
5th–8th	LEC	Fnatic			4–2	1–3			4%	$89,000
9th–12th	LMS	J Team			3–3				2.25%	$50,062.50
9th–12th	LPL	Royal Never Give Up			3–3				2.25%	$50,062.50
9th–12th	LCS	Team Liquid			3–3				2.25%	$50,062.50
9th–12th	LCS	Cloud9			2–4				2.25%	$50,062.50
13th–16th	VCS	GAM Esports			1–5				1.25%	$27,812.50
13th–16th	LMS	ahq e-Sports Club			0–6				1.25%	$27,812.50
13th–16th	LMS	Hong Kong Attitude	3–1	3–1	0–6				1.25%	$27,812.50
13th–16th	LCS	Clutch Gaming*	2–2	3–0	0–6				1.25%	$27,812.50
17th–20th	LCL	Unicorns of Love*	2–2	2–3					0.75%	$16,687.50
17th–20th	VCS	Lowkey Esports	2–2	1–3					0.75%	$16,687.50
17th–20th	LLA	Isurus Gaming	2–2	1–3					0.75%	$16,687.50
17th–20th	TCL	Royal Youth*	1–3	0–3					0.75%	$16,687.50
21st–24th	OPL	Mammoth*	2–2						0.5%	$11,125
21st–24th	CBLOL	Flamengo eSports*	1–3						0.5%	$11,125
21st–24th	LJL	DetonatioN FocusMe	1–3						0.5%	$11,125
21st–24th	LST	MEGA Esports	1–3						0.5%	$11,125
Place	Region	Team	PS1	PS2	GS	QF	SF	Finals	Prize (%)	Prize (USD)
