= Against the Current (band) =

American rock band

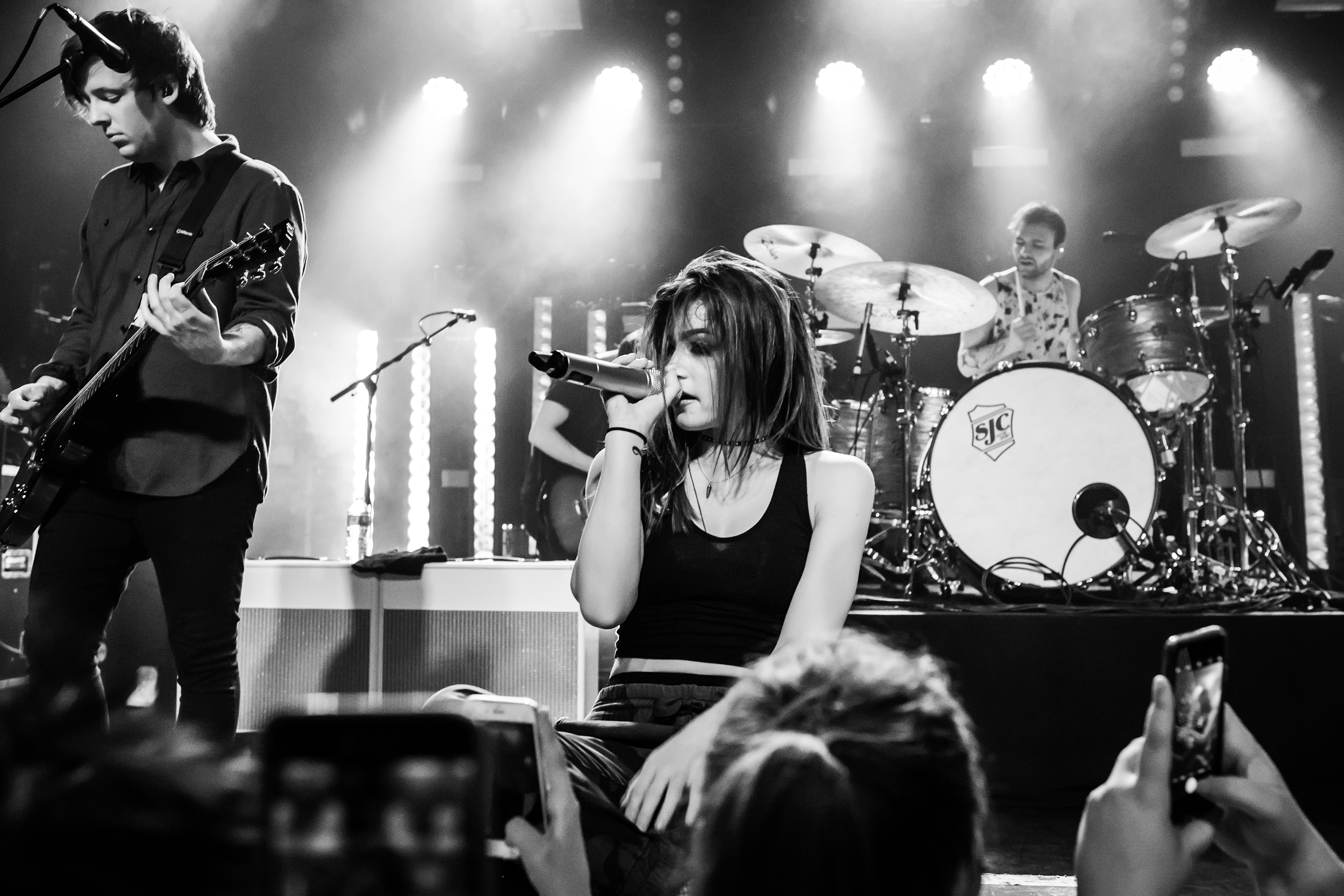
- From left to right: Dan Gow, Chrissy Costanza and Will Ferri

Background information
- Also known as: ATC
- Origin: Poughkeepsie, New York, U.S.
- Genres: Pop rock; pop-punk; alternative rock; synth-pop
- Years active: 2011–present
- Label: Fueled by Ramen
- Members: Chrissy Costanza; Dan Gow; Will Ferri
- Past members: Jeremy Rompala; Joe Simmons
- Website: atcofficial.com

YouTube information
- Channel: againstthecurrent
- Subscribers: 2.1 million
- Views: 513 million
- Last updated: February 25, 2024

Against the Current (often abbreviated as ATC) is an American rock band from Poughkeepsie, New York, formed in 2011. As of 2025, the band consists of lead vocalist Chrissy Costanza, guitarist Dan Gow, and drummer Will Ferri. The band quickly gained a sizeable online following after posting covers of various popular songs on YouTube. They played Warped Tour in 2016.

The band's first EP, Infinity, was released in May 2014 under their own label. The band followed Infinity with their next EP, Gravity, which was released on February 17, 2015. Shortly afterward, they signed to record label Fueled by Ramen. Their debut studio album, In Our Bones was released on May 20, 2016. In 2017, the band collaborated with the popular video game League of Legends in making the song "Legends Never Die" for the 2017 League of Legends World Championship. Their second studio album, Past Lives was released on September 28, 2018. Their third EP, Fever, was released on July 23, 2021. On January 10, 2022, the single "Wildfire" was released. Later that year, the band parted ways with their records company and have been releasing occasional singles since then while continuing to tour.

Their third album, Till Death & Back was released on 30 October 2026.

== History ==
=== Background and origins ===
Against the Current was formed in early 2011 by Dan Gow, Will Ferri, and Jeremy Rompala and was later joined by Chrissy Costanza in the summer of 2011 after being introduced to Gow, Ferri, and Rompala through a mutual friend. Joe Simmons was invited to fill in as their bass player but later joined the band after leaving his former band.

Will Ferri is the younger brother of We Are the In Crowd bass player and artist manager Mike Ferri, as the bands manager Mike Ferri utilized his relationships with well known YouTube cover artists such as Kurt Hugo Schneider and Alex Goot to help the band achieve a considerable amount of fame via various covers of popular songs posted as collaborations on more established channels.

=== Music history ===
In 2014, Joe Simmons & Jeremy Rompala split with the rest of the band.

On May 27, 2014, Against the Current released their debut EP, Infinity, independently through online distribution. The Infinity EP charted at No. 28 on the Heatseekers Albums. They began touring in support of the release of Infinity throughout most of 2014. After several tours, they entered the studio to record their second EP, Gravity, which was released on February 17, 2015. The EP featured six songs, and included a guest appearance from Taka of One Ok Rock on the song '"Dreaming Alone". A few weeks after the release of Gravity, the band announced that they had been signed by the label Fueled By Ramen on March 4, 2015. The Gravity EP charted on four Billboard magazine charts, while it peaked on the Alternative Albums, Independent Albums, Rock Albums, and Heatseekers Albums charts, peaking at 23, 27, 36 and 4, respectively.

On May 22, 2015, the band announced their first headlining tour in support of the Gravity EP, called the Gravity World Tour. The tour spanned 4 months (August 2015 to November 2015), and included stops in several continents, including North America, Asia, and Europe.

On August 1, 2015, Against the Current announced that they had finished recording their first full-length album. On February 6, 2016, the band announced their upcoming album's name, In Our Bones, as well as the release date, May 20, 2016. Their first studio album, In Our Bones, has been called "pop-rock perfection" by Alternative Press.

On September 14, 2017, Against the Current collaborated with Riot Games to create the single "Legends Never Die" for the 2017 League of Legends World Championship, published on Riot Games' YouTube channel. On November 4, 2017, the band performed live at the 2017 League of Legends World Championship opening and closing ceremonies.

On May 11, 2018, Against the Current released two singles, "Strangers Again" and "Almost Forgot", from the album Past Lives, released on September 28, 2018. On August 17, 2018, the band released the single "Personal". The single "Voices" was released on September 14, 2018.

On October 28, 2020, Against the Current released their new song "That Won't Save Us", followed by a second single, "Weapon", on March 10, 2021. These were followed up by a third song "Again & Again", featuring Guardin, on June 23, 2021. The bands first EP since 2015's Gravity called Fever was released on July 23, 2021.

On January 10, 2022, Against the Current collaborated with the League of Legends European Championship for a song called "Wildfire", with casters Vedius and Drakos as guest vocalists, as part of a promotion for the 2022 Spring Season of its League of Legends esports regional league run. In August 2022, they announced that they were no longer signed to Fueled by Ramen. Since then they have released the independent singles "Blindfolded", "Good Guy" and "Silent Stranger", accompanied with the start of their Nightmares & Daydreams World Tour. In 2024, they also released "Barely Breathing" and "Caught It", for which they collaborated with From Ashes to New and Voilà respectively.

On July 11, 2025, the band released a new EP available in digital format called Bonus Tracks, under the Fueled By Ramen label. It includes four tracks already featured as bonus songs on the Japanese versions of the albums In Our Bones and Past Lives.

In March 2026, the band released the single "Heavenly", followed by "Dead Man Walking" in May, "Always You & I" in July, and "Protégé" on September 9, with which they announced their third studio album, Till Death & Back, scheduled for release on October 30, 2026.

== Musical style ==
Against the Current's music is described as pop rock, pop-punk, alternative rock, and synth-pop in publications. On their second album Past Lives, the band moved away from pop-punk; in an interview with Billboard, Costanza reasons "We're all big fans of pop music; this is definitely the direction we’ve always wanted to head in. On this record, we were finally fearless and shed our skin. We wanted to create music that reflected our personalities now and also who we wanted to be."

== Band members ==
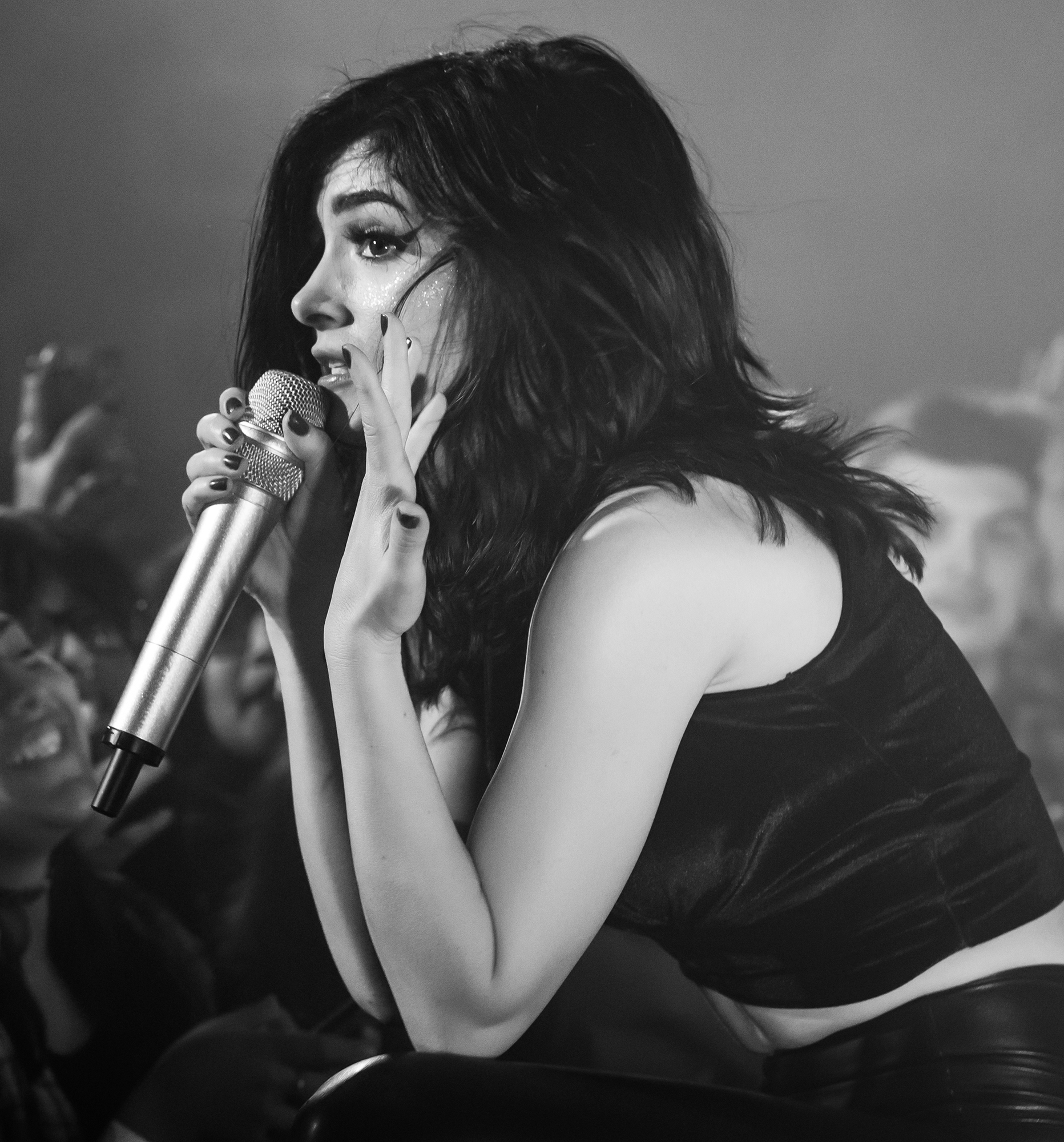
Lead singer Costanza performing in 2016

Current

- Chrissy Costanza – lead vocals (2011–present)
- Dan Gow – lead guitar, backing vocals (2011–present), rhythm guitar, bass (2014–present)
- Will Ferri – drums, acoustic guitar, piano, keyboards, backing vocals (2011–present)

Former

- Jeremy Rompala – rhythm guitar, piano (2011–2014)
- Joe Simmons – bass, backing vocals (2011–2014; touring 2014–present)

Touring

- Roo Buxton – rhythm guitar, lead guitar, keyboards, backing vocals (2015–2018)
- Jordan Eckes (We Are the In Crowd) – rhythm guitar, lead guitar, keyboards (2020–2022), backing vocals (2016–2022), bass (2016–2020)
- David Whitmore – bass, backing vocals (2020–present)
- Joe Cooper - electric guitar, backing vocals (2024-present)

== Discography ==
=== Studio albums ===
List of studio albums, with selected chart positions
Title	Album details	Peak chart positions						
Title	Album details	US	US Alt	US Rock	US Heat	CAN	JPN	UK
In Our Bones	Released: May 20, 2016; Label: Fueled by Ramen; Formats: CD, digital download	181	15	20	2	83	66	28
Past Lives	Released: September 28, 2018; Label: Fueled by Ramen; Formats: CD, digital download	—	—	—	—	—	185	86
Till Death & Back	Released: October 30, 2026; Formats: CD, LP, digital download, streaming	—	—	—	—	—	—	—
"—" denotes a recording that did not chart or was not released.

=== Extended plays ===
List of EPs, with selected chart positions
Title	Details	Peak chart positions				
Title	Details	US Alt	US Ind	US Rock	US Heat	JPN
Infinity	Released: May 27, 2014; Label: Self-released; Formats: CD, digital download	—	—	—	28	—
Infinity (The Acoustic Sessions)	Released: November 27, 2014; Label: Self-released; Format: Digital download	—	—	—	—	—
Gravity	Released: February 17, 2015; Label: Self-released; Formats: CD, digital download	23	27	36	4	33
Gravity (The Acoustic Sessions, Vol. II)	Released: July 10, 2015; Label: Self-released; Format: Digital download	—	—	—	—	—
Fever	Released: July 23, 2021; Label: Fueled by Ramen; Format: Digital download	—	—	—	—	—
Bonus Tracks	Released: July 11, 2025; Label: Fueled by Ramen; Format: Digital download; Bonus tracks featured on Japanese editions of In Our Bones & Past Lives	—	—	—	—	—
"—" denotes a recording that did not chart or was not released.

=== Singles ===
Year	Title	Certifications	Album
2012	"Thinking"		Single only
2013	"Closer, Faster"		Infinity
2013	"Guessing"		Single only
2014	"Gravity"		Gravity
2015	"Outsiders"		Single only
2015	"Talk"		Gravity
2016	"Running with the Wild Things"		In Our Bones
2016	"Runaway"		In Our Bones
2016	"Wasteland"		In Our Bones
2016	"Young & Relentless"		In Our Bones
2017	"Legends Never Die"	RIAA: Gold; BPI: Gold; IFPI DEN: Gold; RMNZ: Platinum	Single only
2018	"Almost Forgot"		Past Lives
2018	"Strangers Again"		Past Lives
2018	"Personal"		Past Lives
2018	"Voices"		Past Lives
2020	"That Won't Save Us"		Fever
2020	"That Won't Save Us (Acoustic)"		Single only
2021	"Weapon"		Fever
2021	"Again & Again"		Fever
2022	"Wildfire" (Includes LEC Version)		Single only
2022	"Blindfolded"		Single only
2023	"good guy"		Single only
2023	"silent stranger"		Single only
2024	"Barely Breathing" (feat. Against The Current)		Single only
2024	"Caught It" (with VOILÀ)		Glass Half Empty
2024	"Out of Your Mind" (feat. Against The Current)		Nosebleeds: Encore
2026	"Heavenly"		Till Death & Back
2026	"Dead Man Walking"		Till Death & Back
2026	"Always You & I"		Till Death & Back
2026	"Protégé"		Till Death & Back
