= MEGA Esports =

Thai esports organization

- Founded: 2012
- Based in: Bangkok, Thailand
- Location: Southeast Asia
- Website: www.megaesports.gg

MEGA Esports is a professional esports organization based in Bangkok, Thailand. It formerly had a League of Legends team competing in the League of Legends SEA Tour (LST), Southeast Asia's top professional league, as well as Dota 2 and Overwatch teams.

In late 2017, they acquired the roster of League of Legends team Bangkok Titans, which qualified for the 2015 World Championship as one of two wildcard representatives. In 2019, MEGA's victories in the LST spring and summer seasons qualified them for that year's Mid-Season Invitational and World Championship.

== League of Legends ==
MEGA
- Game: League of Legends
- Founded: May 2012
- Folded: January 2020
- League: League of Legends SEA Tour
- Team history: Bangkok Titans (2012–2017); MEGA (2017–2020)
- Based in: Bangkok, Thailand

=== History ===
MEGA's League of Legends division was created on 24 December 2017 after their acquisition of the Bangkok Titans, who were one of six teams originally created by Garena during the inception of Southeast Asia's professional League of Legends scene. MEGA finished second in LST 2018 Summer after losing to Ascension Gaming. In LST 2019 Spring and Summer, MEGA played against Malaysian team Axis Empire in the finals, sweeping them 3–0 both times and qualifying MEGA for the 2019 Mid-Season Invitational and 2019 World Championship respectively.

Following the 2019 World Championship, Riot Games announced on 26 November that they had decided to ban MEGA CEO Arnold Tandra from being involved in any of their sanctioned tournaments until 2022. The stated reason was that MEGA had not paid their players on time, which was against Riot's principle of "maintaining a good environment and ecosystem for professional players". MEGA's roster subsequently disbanded in early January 2020.
