= In Our Bones =

Studio album by Against the Current
- Released: May 20, 2016
- Recorded: 2015
- Studios: Studio America (Los Angeles, California)
- Genres: Pop rock; synth-pop; alternative rock; pop-punk
- Length: 38:48
- Labels: Fueled by Ramen; Warner/Chappell Music
- Producers: Andrew Goldstein; Tommy English

Against the Current chronology
Gravity (2014)	In Our Bones (2016)	Past Lives (2018)

Singles from Against the Current
- 1. "Running with the Wild Things" Released: February 4, 2016; 2. "Runaway" Released: February 25, 2016; 3. "Wasteland" Released: March 24, 2016; 4. "Young & Relentless" Released: August 16, 2016

Professional ratings
Aggregate scores
Source	Rating
Metacritic	83/100
Review scores
Source	Rating
Alternative Press	4/5 stars
Kerrang!	5/5 Ks
Rock Sound	8/10
Sputnikmusic	3.9/5

In Our Bones is the debut studio album by American pop rock band Against the Current. The album was released on May 20, 2016.

== Tour ==
The In Our Bones World Tour was officially announced though the band's Facebook, Instagram, Twitter, official website and YouTube channel. It began on September 6, 2016, in Seoul, South Korea and continued throughout Asia, Europe and North America. The tour concluded on October 18, 2017, in Buenos Aires, Argentina.

== Track listing ==
In Our Bones track listing
No.	Title	Writer(s)	Length
1.	"Running with the Wild Things"	Chrissy Costanza; Dan Gow; Will Ferri; Tom Schleiter; Audra Mae	3:43
2.	"Forget Me Now"	Costanza; Gow; Ferri; Schleiter; Nick Long; Steve Aiello	3:01
3.	"Chasing Ghosts"	Costanza; Gow; Ferri; Schleiter; Long	3:30
4.	"One More Weekend"	Costanza; Gow; Jake Haskell; Ferri; Schleiter; Nolan Sipe	3:05
5.	"In Our Bones"	Costanza; Gow; Ferri; Schleiter; Alexandra Tamposi; Stephen Wrabel; Jordi	2:59
6.	"Young & Relentless"	Costanza; Gow; Haskell; Ferri; Schleiter; Andrew Jackson; Maxim	3:22
7.	"Runaway"	Costanza; Gow; Ferri; Schleiter; Long	3:36
8.	"Brighter"	Costanza; Gow; Ferri; Schleiter; Aiello	3:27
9.	"Wasteland"	Costanza; Gow; Ferri; Sipe; Andrew Goldstein	3:25
10.	"Blood Like Gasoline"	Costanza; Gow; Ferri; Schleiter; Drew Pearson; Maxim	3:18
11.	"Roses"	Costanza; Gow; Haskell; Ferri; Schleiter; Long; Aiello	3:38
12.	"Demons"	Costanza; Gow; Ferri; Schleiter; Michael SanFilippo	3:24
Total length:			40:28

Japanese version bonus tracks
No.	Title	Writer(s)	Length
13.	"Steal The Night"	Costanza; Gow; Ferri	3:22
14.	"Zombie"	Costanza; Gow; Ferri	3:04
Total length:			46:54

== Personnel ==
Against the Current

- Chrissy Costanza – lead vocals, songwriting
- Dan Gow – lead guitar, rhythm guitar, bass guitar, backing vocals, songwriting
- Will Ferri – drums, keyboards, piano, backing vocals, songwriting

Additional musicians

- Steve Aiello – piano and background vocals (on "Brighter")
- Jake Haskell – additional bass guitar, songwriting

Production

- Tommy English – production
- Andrew Goldstein – co-production on Wasteland
- Matt Dougherty – engineering
- Neal Avron – mixing
- Scott Skrzynski – mixing assistant

== Chart performance ==
In Our Bones charted at number 181 on the US Billboard 200 chart, at number 15 on the US Top Alternative Albums, and at number 20 on the US Top Rock Albums. In the UK, the album charted at number 28 on the top albums chart. Internationally, the album has also charted in Austria, Belgium, Canada, France, Germany, and Switzerland.

=== Charts ===
Chart (2016)	Peak position
Austrian Albums (Ö3 Austria)	56
Belgian Albums (Ultratop Flanders)	86
Canadian Albums (Billboard)	83
French Albums (SNEP)	148
German Albums (Offizielle Top 100)	56
Scottish Albums (Official Charts)	21
Swiss Albums (Schweizer Hitparade)	60
UK Albums (Official Charts)	28
UK Downloads Chart (OCC)	17
UK Physical Albums Chart (OCC)	29
UK Rock & Metal Albums Chart (OCC)	2
UK Sales Chart (OCC)	20
US Billboard 200	181
US Top Album Sales (Billboard)	67
US Top Alternative Albums (Billboard)	15
US Heatseekers Albums (Billboard)	2
US Top Rock Albums (Billboard)	20
