= Peanut (gamer) =

South Korean professional esports player (born 1998)

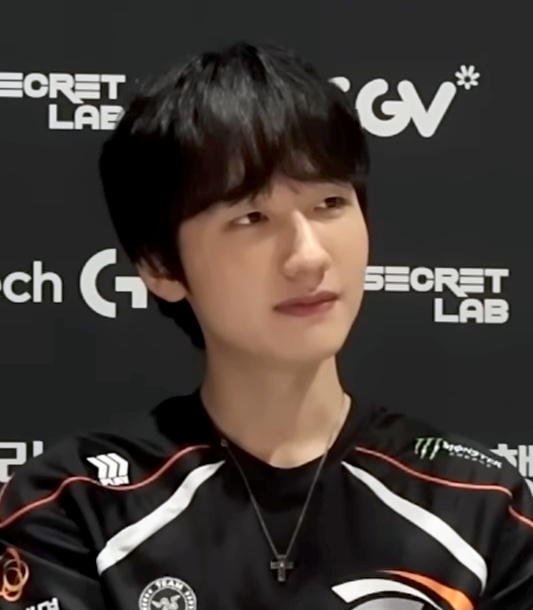
- Peanut in 2025

Personal information
- Name: 한왕호 (Han Wang-ho)
- Born: 윤왕호 (Yoon Wang-ho); February 3, 1998 (age 28)
- Nationality: South Korean

Career information
- Game: League of Legends
- Playing career: 2015–2025
- Role: Jungler

Team history
- 2015: Najin e-mFire
- 2016: ROX Tigers
- 2017: SK Telecom T1
- 2018 (Note: Competed with Longzhu Gaming in the 2017 KeSPA Cup): Kingzone DragonX (Note: Known as Longzhu Gaming until April 2018)
- 2019 (Note: Competed with Gen.G in the 2018 KeSPA Cup): Gen.G
- 2020 (Note: Competed with LGD Gaming in the Demacia Championship 2019): LGD Gaming
- 2021: Nongshim RedForce
- 2022–2023: Gen.G
- 2024–2025: Hanwha Life Esports

Career highlights and awards
- MSI champion (2017); First Stand champion (2025); 7× LCK champion; LCK season MVP; 2× LCK Finals MVP; 2× LCK All-Pro First Team; LCK Cup champion; KeSPA Cup champion (2016)
Medal record
Esports
Representing South Korea
Asian Games
| Silver medal – second place | 2018 Jakarta – Palembang | League of Legends |

Han Wang-ho (Korean: 한왕호; born Yoon Wang-ho, February 3, 1998), better known as Peanut, is a South Korean former professional League of Legends player. Throughout his career, he has one Mid-Season Invitational title, one First Stand title, seven League of Legends Champions Korea (LCK) titles and one KeSPA Cup title. He also represented the South Korean national team at the 2018 Asian Games, earning a silver medal.

Peanut's career began in 2015, at age 16, when he signed with League of Legends Champions Korea (LCK) team Najin e-mFire for the 2015 LCK season. From 2015 to 2021, Peanut played for a different team every year. In 2016, he signed with ROX Tigers, won the 2016 LCK Summer Split, and reached the 2016 World Championship Semi-Finals. He then signed with SK Telecom T1 in 2017, winning the 2017 Mid-Season Invitational and another LCK title. The following year, in his fifth consecutive LCK finals appearance, he won his third LCK title with Kingzone DragonX. After a disappointing year with Gen.G in 2019, he left the LCK to sign with League of Legends Pro League team LGD Gaming in 2020, where he made another World Championship appearance. In 2021, he signed with Nongshim RedForce and was traded the following year to Gen.G. In his second stint with Gen.G, from 2022 to 2023, Peanut won three LCK titles and made two World Championship appearances. He then signed with Hanwha Life Esports for the 2024 LCK season and retired after the 2025 season.

Peanut's individual accomplishments include accolades such as an LCK Season MVP award, two LCK Finals MVP awards, and one LCK First All-Pro Team designation. In 2021, he recorded his 1,000th kill in the LCK and became the 11th player in LCK history to record 2,500 assists.

== Professional career ==
At the age of 16, Peanut expressed his desire to become a professional League of Legends player to his aunt before discussing it with his parents. Despite excelling in academics, he faced disapproval from his mother when she discovered his frequent visits to PC bangs. This led to the first confrontation with his parents, as his mother emphasized the importance of academic success. Following a heated argument, Peanut's determination to pursue a career in professional gaming persuaded his father, who supported him with the condition not to blame them if things did not go as planned. Despite initial hesitation, Peanut's parents bought him a new computer, and he began practicing extensively at home.

=== Najin e-mFire ===
Peanut entered the competitive League of Legends scene when he signed with Najin e-mFire for the 2015 LCK season. However, his debut was initially delayed due to age restrictions, as he was sidelined until he turned 17 on February 3. He made his LCK debut with the team in a match against SK Telecom T1 (SKT). While Nanjin lost, Peanut maintained a 100% kill participation in game one, playing a part in all seven of his team's kills, while in games two and three, his kill participation dropped to 72%–76%. Throughout the season, his split time with the team's starting jungler, Jae-geol "Watch" Cho. In the spring split, Najin concluded with a 5–9 record, narrowly avoiding the need to compete in the promotion tournament. The team fared better in the summer split, ending with 11 wins and 7 losses. Although Najin advanced to the LCK Summer Split Playoffs, they were eliminated in the first round by KOO Tigers. In his rookie year, Peanut participated in a total of 17 games, securing seven wins and 10 losses.

=== ROX Tigers ===
Following the 2015 season, Peanut signed with ROX Tigers (formerly KOO Tigers). In the 2016 LCK Spring Split, the Tigers secured the top spot in the regular season standings, earning a bye directly into the playoff finals where they faced SKT. However, they lost the match, 1–3, finishing in second place. The subsequent summer split saw them once again claiming the top spot in the regular season standings, leading to a playoff finals match against KT Rolster. Peanut clinched his first domestic title as the Tigers emerged victorious in the finals with a 3–2 score.

By winning the Summer Split Finals, the Tigers secured a spot in the 2016 League of Legends World Championship as the LCK's top seed. After advancing past the group stage, the Tigers defeated EDward Gaming in the knockout quarterfinals and moved on to face SKT in the semifinals. Prior to the semifinals, Peanut led all players at the World Championship with 57 kills. The semifinals match was tied after four games, bring the match to a decisive game five. Peanut played as the champion Elise, a champion whom he had a KDA ratio of 23 heading into the match. Despite securing first blood by eliminating Bae "Bengi" Sung-woong, Peanut was soon after himself killed Bengi and Lee "Faker" Sang-hyeok. Although the teams remained evenly matched for the first 20 minutes, SKT gained control around the 40-minute mark, ultimately winning the match 3–2. Peanut concluded the World Championship with the highest average kills per game among all players with at least 10 games played; no jungler since the Season 3 World Championship had been in the top five.

At the end of the year Peanut won the 2016 KeSPA Cup, as ROX Tigers defeated Kongdoo Monster in the final.

=== SK Telecom T1 ===
Peanut's contract with the Tigers expired on November 30, 2016. On the same day, he signed with SK Telecom T1. In the 2017 LCK Spring Split with SKT, Peanut played in a total of 36 games, tallying 133 kills, 65 deaths, and 199 assists. SKT finished atop the regular season standings, receiving a bye directly into the playoff finals, where they faced KT Rolster. In game two of the finals, Peanut had six kills, one death, and eight assists, including a triple kill at the 28-minute mark that contributed to the team's victory. In game three, he finished with 11 kills, one death, and nine assists, which included another triple kill at the 17-minute mark. SKT clinched the series with a 3–0 win, securing Peanut back-to-back LCK titles. Peanut was named the MVP of the finals.

With the LCK Summer championship title, SKT qualified for the 2017 Mid-Season Invitational (MSI). During the group stage of the MSI, Peanut delivered standout performances, particularly when playing as the champion Lee Sin. In a match against GIGABYTE Marines, he set a record for the most kills within the first 15 minutes of a professional game, finishing with 15 kills, 14 of which were secured in the initial 12 minutes. Throughout the entire group stage, Peanut maintained a 4–0 record when playing as the Lee Sin, recording a KDA ratio of 11. SKT moved on past the group stage of the event and defeated Flash Wolves in the playoff semifinals, earning a spot in the 2017 MSI Final against G2 Esports. SKT secured a victory in game one, but in game two, Peanut played as Ivern, a champion with which he had limited familiarity, due to head coach Kim "kkOma" Jeong-gyun's draft choices. G2 had a strong early game, with Kim "Trick" Gang-yun securing first blood on Peanut, as SKT went on to lose the game. However, Peanut rebounded in game three, securing first blood as Lee Sin and ultimately winning the match. In game four, with Lee Sin banned, Peanut played as Olaf, a champion he was comfortable with, securing first blood once again. His well-timed intervention in the bottom lane, just before G2's bot lane hit level six, provided an early lead for SKT, which they maintained. Peanut ended the game with nine kills, no deaths, and six assists, securing his first-ever international title with the MSI victory.

SKT finished the 2017 LCK Summer Split regular season in fourth place with a 13–5 record. During the season, Peanut shared playing time with Kang "Blank" Sun-gu, plating in 24 games and accumulating 41 kills, 53 deaths, and 107 assists. Entering the LCK Summer playoffs in the first round, SKT advanced to the finals to face Longzhu Gaming. This marked Peanut's fourth consecutive LCK final appearance, becoming the first player in LCK history to do so. In the finals, Peanut started as the team's jungler over Blank. However, after a challenging game one where Peanut faced difficulties capitalizing on Longzhu rookie Moon "Cuzz" Woo-chan and primarily focused on mid lane kills rather than seizing other opportunities on the map, he was substituted out for Blank. SKT went on to two of the next three games, ultimately losing the match, 1–3, and finishing in second place.

SKT qualified for the 2017 World Championship as the LCK's second seed. After making it past the group stage and winning their quarterfinals matchup, SKT faced Royal Never Give Up in the semifinals. For the semifinals match, SKT elected to start Kang "Blank" Sun-gu over Peanut as the team's jungler. However, after falling behind 1–2 in the series, SKT brought Peanut back in for games four and five. The team won the final two games to win the series 3–2 and advance to the World Championship finals. In the Worlds final against Samsing Galaxy, Peanut started the match, but after SKT lost games one and two, he was taken out in favor of Blank. SKT went on to lose the third match as well, finishing in second at the World Championship. Following their World Championship loss, SKT announced that they would not be renewing Peanut's contract.

=== Longzhu Gaming / Kingzone DragonX ===
On November 25, 2017, Peanut signed with Longzhu Gaming, reuniting with his former ROX Tigers teammates Kim "PraY" Jong-in and Kang "GorillA" Beom-hyun. His first tournament with the team was the 2017 KeSPA Cup, which began on December 1, 2017. Longzhu advanced to the finals of the event, defeating Peanut's former team SK Telecom T1 in the semifinals along the way. However, they lost to their finals opponent, KT Rolster.

Just before the start of the 2018 LCK Spring Split, Longzhu Gaming rebranded to Kingzone DragonX. He played 32 games in the regular season, finishing with a KDA ratio of 8.9. The team finished atop the regular season standings with a 16–2 record, advancing them directly to the 2018 LCK Spring Split finals. In his fifth consecutive LCK Finals appearance, he picked up his third LCK title after Kingzone defeated Afreeca Freecs, 3–1, in the finals. In the 2018 Mid-Season Invitational, Kingzone advanced past the group stage and defeated Flash Wolves in the playoff finals to face Royal Never Give Up in the finals. However, Kingzone lost the match, 1–3, finishing in second place. Kingzone finished the 2018 LCK Summer split in third place with a 13–5 record. Despite a strong regular season, they lost in the playoffs to Afreeca Freecs. The team moved on to the 2018 LCK regional qualifier for the chance to qualify for the 2018 World Championship but lost in the finals to Gen.G, ending their season.

=== Gen.G ===
Following the 2017 World Championship, Peanut became a free agent and received lucrative offers from various teams outside the LCK. Despite multiple million-dollar proposals, he opted to remain in the LCK. Gen.G extended an offer that would make him the highest-paid jungler in the league, and on November 23, 2017, Peanut officially signed with Gen.G. Peanut struggled throughout the 2019 LCK season, and Gen.G barely avoided relegation in the Spring Split. While his performance improved slightly in the Summer Split, Gen.G finished in sixth place during the regular season, and Peanut failed to reach the World Championship for the second year in a row. On November 18, 2019, Gen.G parted ways with Peanut.

=== LGD Gaming ===
On November 22, 2019, Peanut left the LCK to sign with League of Legends Pro League (LPL) team LGD Gaming. The team struggled throughout the 2020 LPL Spring Split, finishing in 15th place with a 5–16 record. However, in the Summer Split, the LDG qualified for the playoffs and finished in fourth place. Throughout the 2020 LPL season, Peanut ranked among the top five LPL junglers for first blood percentage and gold difference. After defeating Invictus Gaming in the final of the LPL regional qualifier, LGD Gaming's earned them a spot in the 2020 World Championship as the LPL's final seed. Despite Peanut's generally strong showing in the LPL regular season, he faced challenges adapting to the meta at the 2020 World Championship, and LGD failed to make it to past the group stage. Following their Worlds exit, LGD parted ways with Peanut.

=== Nongshim RedForce ===
On November 30, 2020, Peanut made a return to the LCK by signing with Team Dynamics, which later rebranded to Nongshim RedForce in December 2020. This marked his seventh team in as many years. In the 2021 LCK Spring Split, Nongshim had middling results, finishing sixth place in the regular season, but secured a spot in the playoffs. However, they lost in the playoffs to Hanwha Life Esports, 2–3, with Peanut having little impact in the match. Peanut's performance notably improved in the 2021 LCK Summer Split. On June 24, 2021, he recorded his 1,000th kill in the LCK in a victory over T1. Additionally, he reached 2,500 assists in the LCK on August 1, 2021, during a win against Hanwha Life Esports, reaching the 11th most in LCK history. This win also secured Nongshim a spot in the summer playoffs. Peanut concluded the regular season with the second-best KDA average at 4.8 and the second-lowest average deaths per game at 1.8 among all junglers in the LCK. He was named the MVP of the 2021 LCK Summer Split and earned a spot on the LCK's First All-Pro team. Despite their regular-season success, Nongshim lost to DWG KIA in the second round of the playoffs. Nongshim then competed in the LCK regional qualifier. They faced Hanwha Life Esports on the second day of the qualifier, with the winner advancing to the 2021 World Championship, but they lost the match, 0–3, ending their season.

=== Return to Gen.G ===
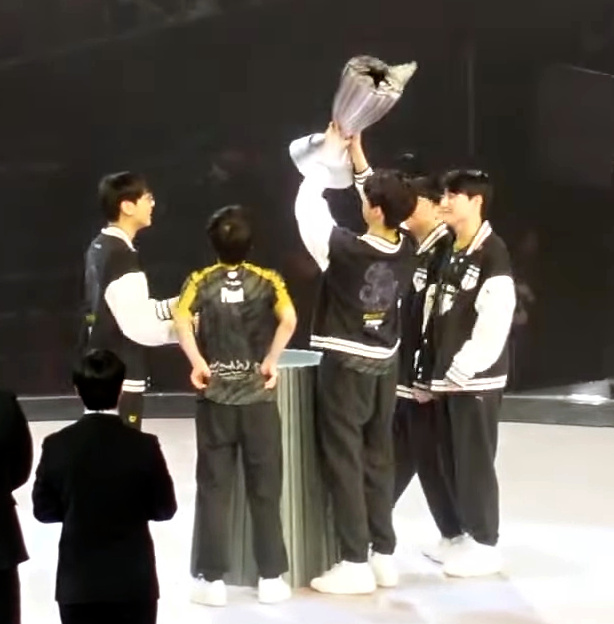
Peanut, with Gen.G, winning his 6th LCK title

On November 23, 2021, Peanut returned to Gen.G after Nongshim traded him in exchange for Gwak "Bdd" Bo-seong. The team finished the 2022 LCK Spring Split in second place, advancing to the semifinals of the playoffs. Gen.G advanced to the LCK Spring Split Finals, marking Peanut's first finals appearance in three years. However, they were defeated, 1–3, finishing in second place. During the 2022 LCK Summer Split, Gen.G performed well with a 17–1 record. Gen.G became the third team in LCK history to win 17 or more matches in a single split, with an 87.5% game record — the highest percentage in LCK history. Peanut finished the summer regular season with the best KDA and least average deaths among all junglers in the LCK and was named to the LCK First All-Pro Team for the second time in his career. Gen.G secured a spot in the 2022 LCK Summer Finals, where they faced T1 on August 28. The team went on to win the series 3–0, giving Peanut his fourth LCK title and securing Gen.G the top LCK seed in the 2022 World Championship. Peanut was named the finals MVP. In the World Championship, Gen.G progressed beyond the group stage and secured a 3–2 victory over DWG KIA in the knockout quarterfinals. They faced DRX in the semifinals, a team they had not lost to all year. However, DRX won the match, 3–1, ending Gen.G's Worlds run.

Heading into the 2023, Gen.G extended Peanut's contract. In the 2023 LCK Spring Split, Gen.G secured a second-place finish in the standings, trailing behind T1. During the playoffs, they defeated Hanwha with a 3–1 victory, earning a spot in the LCK Finals against T1. The best-of-five match took place on April 9, 2023, and Gen.G won by a 3–1 score, securing Peanut his fifth LCK title. As the Spring Split champions, Gen.G qualified for the 2023 Mid-Season Invitational (MSI), marking Peanut's third appearance at MSI. Gen.G started the in event's bracket stage, a double-elimination tournament. In their first match, they defeated G2 Esports. Following, they lost to T1, sending Gen.G to the lower bracket. After taking down Cloud9 in their next match, they lost to Bilibili Gaming, ending their MSI run. In the 2023 Summer Split, Peanut clinched his third consecutive LCK title, and sixth overall, as Gen.G defeated T1 in the finals. This placed him second among active players with the most LCK titles, behind Faker. In the Swiss stage of the 2023 World Championship, Gen.G posted a 3–0 record, advancing them to the knockout stage, where they faced Bilibili in the quarterfinals. However, the team was defeated, 0–3, ending their Worlds run.

On November 20, 2023, Peanut's contract with Gen.G ended, and he entered free agency.

=== Hanwha Life Esports ===
Peanut signed with Hanwha Life Esports ahead of the 2024 LCK season.

The team performed well during the 2024 LCK Spring Split, finishing in 3rd place with a 15–3 record, losing only to Gen.G and T1 with head-to-head scores of 0–2 and 1–1 respectively. Peanut himself earned 800 Player Of the Game (POG) points, earning him 6th in the overall POG standings. He was also the 3rd All-Pro team's jungler pick.

During the 2024 LCK Spring Playoffs, Hanwha Life Esports beat Kwangdong Freecs 3–0 in the first round and T1 3–0 in the second round, too. They then went on the face Gen.G in the round 3 upper finals, whom they lost to 1–3. This knocked them down into the lower finals, where they faced T1 once more. However, Hanwha Life Esports couldn't repeat their previous win, ultimately losing to T1 1–3 as well, meaning they placed 3rd overall.

As only the 1st and 2nd place got a chance to represent LCK at the 2024 Mid-Season Invitational, this marked the end of Hanwha Life Esports' spring split.

The 2024 LCK Summer Split saw Hanwha Life Esports placing 2nd with a 14–4 score, below only the dominant Gen.G. Overall, the matchups between the top 5 teams – save for Gen.G – were much closer, with Hanwha Life Esports seeing 1–1 head-to-head scores with both Dplus KIA, the third place team, as well as KT Rolster, the 5th place team. Namely, Hanwha Life Esports managed to beat the slumping T1 in 4th place both times they met. Peanut's performances earned him 800 POG points, placing him 4th in the overall standings. He was also picked as the 2nd All-Pro team's jungler, alongside all of his teammates.

Finishing 2nd during the summer regular season meant Hanwha Life Esports got a bye into the 2nd round of the 2024 LCK Summer Playoffs, where they faced T1. Hanwha Life Esports managed to put up dominant performances in games 1 and 3, ultimately winning the series 3–0. Advancing into the upper finals, the team faced off against Gen.G in a series they eventually lost 1–3, knocking them into the lower finals once again. Just like during spring, Hanwha Life Esports met T1 for a rematch. In a role-reversal from spring though, they managed to beat T1 3–1, earning themselves an appearance in the grand finals, where they would rematch Gen.G. In a long, 5-game series between the two teams, Hanwha Life Esports ultimately emerged victorious, breaking Gen.G's long streak of 4 title wins, and earning themselves both the title of Summer Champions, as well as LCK's first seed spot into the 2024 League of Legends World Championship. Namely, Peanut was named MVP four times during the playoffs – the most out of everyone.

Heading into the 2025 season with a new top laner, the team qualified for the 2025 First Stand Tournament after winning the LCK Cup. There, Peanut won his first international title in over 8 years, after defeating Karmine Corp 3–1 in the First Stand 2025 final. Despite not making that year's Mid-Season Invitational after losing to T1 in the qualifying match, the team maintained strong form to make it to the LCK Season Finals. After Peanut announced his retirement from professional play before the conclusion of the 2025 season due to mandatory military service in South Korea, Hanwha Life Esports were unable to defend their title in the season finals after losing to Gen.G 3–1. Despite the loss, Hanwha Life Esports still qualified for Worlds 2025 as the LCK's second seed. The team ultimately lost to Gen.G in the quarterfinals. Subsequently, Peanut retired from professional League of Legends to complete the mandatory military service.

== National team career ==
Peanut represented South Korea in the League of Legends demonstration event at the 2018 Asian Games. The tournament took place at the BritAma Arena at Mahaka Square in Jakarta, Indonesia, from August 27 to 29, 2018. The South Korean team earned a silver medal after a 1–3 loss to China in the finals.

== Player profile ==
Peanut initially gained recognition for his aggressive jungle style and competitive spirit. However, a notable weakness in his overall playstyle emerged in the form of subpar vision control. Coined as a "living ward" during his early ROX days, Peanut faced criticism for relying on pushing lanes to create invasion opportunities without establishing vision for sustained advantages or tracking the enemy jungler. This deficiency persisted during his stint with SK Telecom T1 in 2017, where the team struggled with mid-game vision control, hindering their ability to recover from deficits. SKT benched Peanut in 2017 due to his tendency for overzealous plays, a trait commonly associated with amateur players transitioning into the professional scene despite having top-tier mechanical skills. During this period, Peanut underwent a playstyle shift influenced by changes in the meta, particularly towards a more lane-focused approach. Unlike his previous experiences, he no longer had the luxury of a frequent isolated winning top lane dynamic to exploit. Instead, he had to prioritize setting up for his lanes to succeed, reflecting the evolving landscape of the game. Acknowledging the impact of the shifting meta, Peanut highlighted the significant influence of the transition from a jungle-centric to a more lane-focused style on his gameplay. The diminishing effectiveness of his preferred aggressive playstyle, which involved invading and applying pressure from the lanes, was further compounded by the increasing importance of catchup experience towards the end of 2017. In his 2020 LPL season, Peanut adapted his playstyle to outpace opponents' junglers through efficient pathing. Leveraging his teammates in the lanes became a key strategy for gaining overall team advantages. Notably, Peanut excelled in catching opponent junglers in unexpected positions, initiating battles strategically to secure victories. His ability to synchronize movements with teammates resulted in stable lane skirmishes, showcasing a more cohesive and effective approach compared to his earlier years.

== Seasons overview ==
| Year | Team | Domestic | | | | | Regional | International | | |
| Year | Team | League | Split | | | | Rift Rivals | First Stand | Mid-Season Invitational | World Championship |
| Year | Team | League | Cup | Spring | Summer | Season Playoffs | Rift Rivals | First Stand | Mid-Season Invitational | World Championship |
|---|---|---|---|---|---|---|---|---|---|---|
| 2015 | Najin e-mFire | LCK | —N/a | 6th | 5th | —N/a | —N/a | —N/a | Did not qualify | Did not qualify |
| 2016 | ROX Tigers | LCK | —N/a | 2nd | 1st | —N/a | —N/a | —N/a | Did not qualify | 3rd–4th |
| 2017 | SK Telecom T1 | LCK | —N/a | 1st | 2nd | —N/a | 2nd | —N/a | 1st | 2nd |
| 2018 | Kingzone DragonX | LCK | —N/a | 1st | 4th | —N/a | 2nd | —N/a | 2nd | Did not qualify |
| 2019 | Gen.G | LCK | —N/a | 7th | 6th | —N/a | Did not qualify | —N/a | Did not qualify | Did not qualify |
| 2020 | LGD Gaming | LPL | —N/a | 15th | 4th | —N/a | —N/a | —N/a | None held (Note: Cancelled due to the COVID-19 pandemic.) | 9th–12th |
| 2021 | Nongshim RedForce | LCK | —N/a | 6th | 4th | —N/a | —N/a | —N/a | Did not qualify | Did not qualify |
| 2022 | Gen.G | LCK | —N/a | 2nd | 1st | —N/a | —N/a | —N/a | Did not qualify | 3rd–4th |
| 2023 | Gen.G | LCK | —N/a | 1st | 1st | —N/a | —N/a | —N/a | 4th | 5th–8th |
| 2024 | Hanwha Life Esports | LCK | —N/a | 3rd | 1st | —N/a | —N/a | —N/a | Did not qualify | 5th–8th |
| 2025 | Hanwha Life Esports | LCK | 1st | —N/a | —N/a | 2nd | —N/a | 1st | Did not qualify | 5th–8th |

== Awards and honors ==
International

- One-time Mid-Season Invitational champion – 2017
- One-time First Stand champion — 2025

LCK

- Seven-time LCK champion – Summer 2016, Spring 2017, Spring 2018, Summer 2022, Spring 2023, Summer 2023, Summer 2024
- One-time LCK Cup champion – 2025
- One-time LCK Season MVP – Summer 2021
- Two-time LCK Finals MVP – Spring 2017, Summer 2022
- Two-time First LCK All-Pro Team – Summer 2021, Summer 2022
- Three-time Second LCK All-Pro Team – Spring 2023, Summer 2023, Summer 2024
- Two-time Third LCK All-Pro Team – Spring 2022, Spring 2024

LPL

- One-time LPL Third All-Pro team – Spring 2020

KeSPA

- One-time KeSPA Cup champion – 2016

== Personal life ==
Peanut was born on February 3, 1998.
