= Deft (gamer) =

South Korean League of Legends player

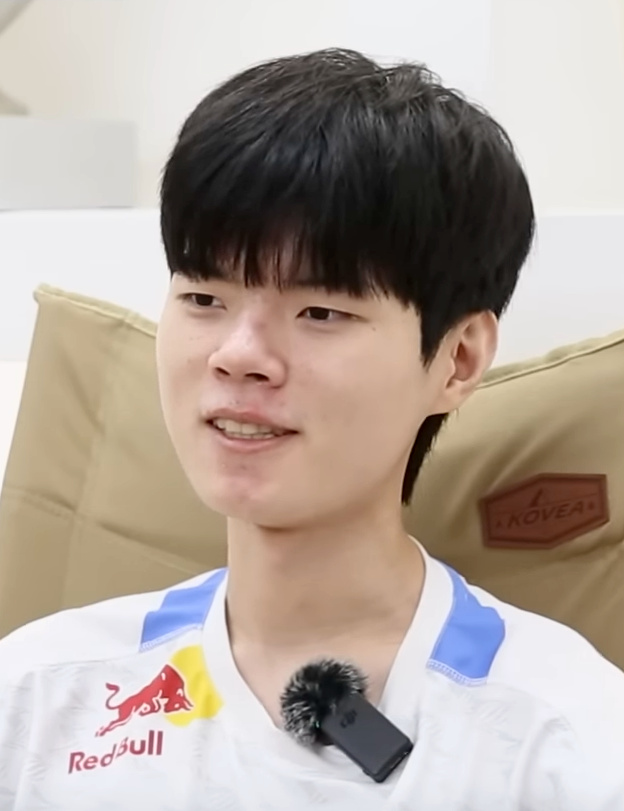
- Deft in 2022

Personal information
- Name: 김혁규 (Kim Hyuk-kyu)
- Nickname(s): Unbreakable Heart, One Man Army, Alpaca
- Born: October 23, 1996 (age 30); Seoul, South Korea

Career information
- Game: League of Legends
- Role: AD Carry

Team history
- 2013: MVP Blue
- 2014: Samsung Blue
- 2015–2016: Edward Gaming
- 2017–2018: KT Rolster
- 2019–2020: DRX (Note: Known as KING-ZONE DragonX in 2019.)
- 2021: Hanwha Life Esports
- 2022: DRX
- 2023: Dplus KIA (Note: Known as DWG KIA from January 2021 to January 2023.)
- 2024: KT Rolster

Career highlights and awards
- World champion (2022); MSI champion (2015); 2× LCK champion; 2× LPL champion; Rift Rivals champion (2019); 4× Demacia Cup champion; KeSPA Cup champion (2017); G-League champion (2014); 2× LoL Masters champion

Kim Hyuk-kyu (Korean: 김혁규; RR: Gim Hyeokgyu), better known as Deft (데프트), is a South Korean professional League of Legends player. Deft won his first LCK title with Samsung Blue. He won the 2015 Mid-Season Invitational and two LPL titles with Edward Gaming. He won his 2nd LCK title with KT Rolster and the 2022 League of Legends World Championship with DRX. Deft is the only other player aside from Ruler that has won the LCK, LPL, MSI and Worlds. He is considered one of the greatest marksman players of all time.

== Career ==
=== MVP Blue / Samsung Blue (2013–2014) ===
Deft began his League of Legends career signing with MVP Blue on February 19, 2013. He made his professional debut in the 2013 Champions Korea season on April 3, 2013. The team failed to make it out of the group stage in either of the season's splits. Following, MVP Blue was acquired by Samsung Galaxy, becoming Samsung Blue. Deft won his first domestic title in the 2014 Champions Spring Split, after Samsung defeated Najin Shield in the finals. The team qualified for the 2014 League of Legends World Championship and reached the semifinals of the event before being knocked out by their sister team and eventual champions, Samsung White.

=== Edward Gaming (2015–2016) ===
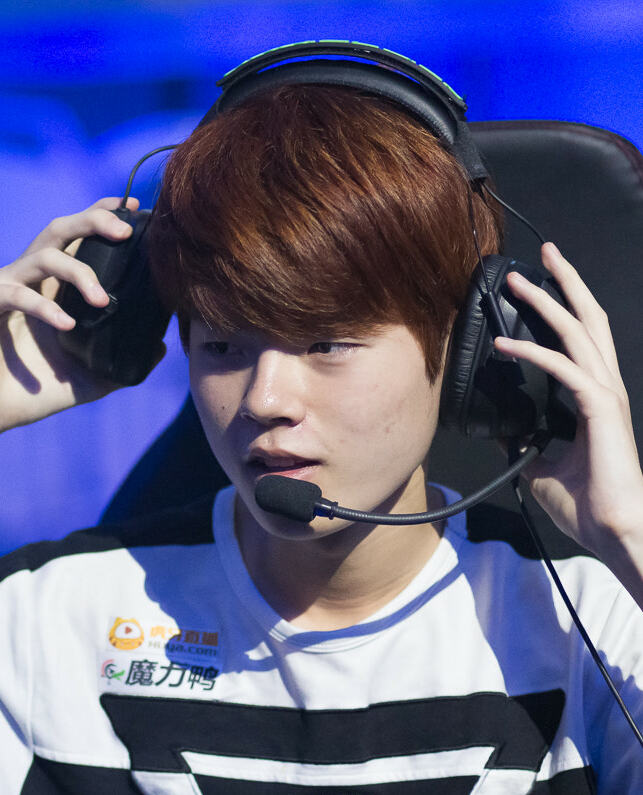
Deft in the 2015 LPL Summer Split

In November 2014, Deft signed with Edward Gaming (EDG) of the Chinese League of Legends Pro League (LPL). In his first split with the team, Deft reached the 2015 LPL Spring Split Finals where Edward Gaming faced LGD Gaming. The series was tied 2–2 after four games, culminating in a decisive fifth game. At around 35 minutes into game five, LGD had control around the Baron and looked to secure the Nashor to overcome a major gold deficit. However, Deft secured a pentakill that led to a win for EDG, giving Deft his first LPL title. With the LPL title, Edward gaming qualified for the 2015 Mid-Season Invitational (MSI). Deft won his first international title at MSI, after Edward Gaming defeated SK Telecom T1 in the finals.

In the 2016 LPL Summer Split, Deft had the second-highest KDA ratio among all AD Carries in the LPL at 6.3.

Deft became the seventh player to reach 1,000 kills in the LPL on August 26, 2016.

The team faced RNG in both finals, in which they lost Spring with 1–3 and won Summer with 3–0.

Deft and EDward Gaming qualified for 2016 World Championship, where they lost 1–3 in quarter-finals against ROX Tigers. Deft went back to Korea after the tournament.

=== KT Rolster (2017–2018) ===
After spending two years in China, Deft signed with KT Rolster on December 1, 2016, returning to Korea to compete in the League of Legends Champions Korea (LCK).

The teams met in the LCK Spring Split Finals, where KT Rolster fell with 0–3, and LCK Summer Split Semi-Finals, where KT Rolster failed to win again, this time 2–3. The lost in Summer split pushed the team out of qualifying for the Season 7 World Championship with tournament points, in which KT Rolster had to win the Korea Regional Qualifier in order to make it. In Regional Finals, KT lost to eventual World Champions, Samsung Galaxy with a score of 0–3.

Deft and the rest of KT Rolster decided to remain in the team even after a disappointing season. The team placed 3rd in Spring Split Playoffs and 1st in Summer Split Playoffs, where they defeated the rookie sensation team, Griffin, with 3–2, making it Deft's second LCK title. Deft received the most MVP games in the whole league, but did not win the Spring Split MVP award.

KT Rolster qualified for 2018 League of Legends World Championship, where they lost in an extremely close series to eventual World Champions, Invictus Gaming, with 2–3.

=== DRX (2019–2020) ===
On November 25, 2018, Deft joined Kingzone DragonX. The team achieved 3rd place in the Spring Split Playoffs. He became the ninth player to reach 1,000 kills in the LCK. He achieved his 1,000 kills on March 21, 2019. His 1,000th kill was on kt Rolster Kingen's Aatrox with his Ezreal. He is the first and only player to have reached 1,000 kills in two different regions. The team collapsed in Summer Split, resulting them to place at 7th in regular season. It was the first time in Deft's career where he missed playoffs. However, high placing in Spring Split allowed Kingzone DragonX to get a second chance at qualifying for World Championship, but the team ultimately fell in Regional Finals to DAMWON Gaming in a close, 2–3 effort.

On October 10, 2019, Kingzone DragonX rebranded as DragonX, and decided to rebuild the team around Deft. The team was completed with rookies such as Pyosik and Keria from DragonX academy, and the Griffin duo Doran and Chovy. DragonX placed 3rd and 2nd respectively in the LCK Spring and Summer Splits, which qualified them for Mid Season Cup 2020 and Season 10 World Championship. At Mid Season Cup, DRX placed tied for 2nd in the group with a 2–1 record, but lost both tie-breaker games. The team lost the LCK Summer Season Finals against Damwon Gaming with a match score of 0–3. At World Championship, DRX lost again in the quarter-finals to the eventual World Champions Damwon Gaming with a match score of 0–3.

=== Hanwha Life Esports (2021) ===
On November 23, 2020, Deft joined Hanwha Life Esports. The team struggled for most of the Spring Split, but managed to get 3rd place in LCK Spring Split Playoffs. On February 4, 2021, Deft won his 300th game in the LCK. His 300th win was against Afreeca Freecs. On March 14, 2021, Deft became the third player to have played 500 games in the LCK. He won his 500th game against Liiv SANDBOX. In Summer, the struggles piled up even more and the team placed 8th in LCK Summer Split, the lowest place Deft achieved since 2013. However, a high standings placement in Spring Split let HLE get a second chance at qualifying for the 2021 World Championship, where the team went on a "miracle run" winning 2 series in a row from the lowest placement in the bracket in the Regional Finals. They first defeated Liiv SANDBOX with a set score of 3–1, then swept Nongshim Redforce with a set score of 3–0, allowed them to grab the final seat for World Championship. In the match against T1 to determine the 4th seed, they lost with a set score of 2–3, and was placed second in the Regional Finals. Second place allowed Deft and his team to qualify for the World Championship, this time as the lowest LCK seed having to start the competition from The Play-In Tournament. HLE placed 2nd in Play-Ins and managed to make it to the quarter-finals, where they eventually met T1 again, in a losing effort 0–3.

=== Return to DRX (2022) ===
On December 4, 2021, DRX announced that Deft would be joining them for the upcoming season. Deft and his team struggled with 3 consecutive losses at the beginning of the split. They gained their first win of the split in the match against Kwangdong Freecs. In February 2022, Deft reached became the first player to reach the 3,000 career kills milestone. He also played his career 1,000th game in the same month, and was the first player to achieve the milestone. On February 24, 2022, Deft became the second player and the first AD Carry to reach 2,000 kills in the LCK. He played his 600th LCK games on March 24, 2022. His team was placed 4th in LCK Spring 2022, after losing to Kwangdong Freecs with a score of 2–3. Deft and his team was placed 6th in LCK Summer 2022, after losing to Liiv Sandbox with a score of 1–3. On September 4, 2022, Deft and his team successfully secured the last LCK spot to the World Championship after defeating Liiv Sandbox with a match score of 3–2. After going undefeated in play-ins and finishing first in the group stage, DRX reverse swept Edward Gaming, becoming the second team ever to reverse sweep someone at Worlds. Coincidentally, this occurred on Deft's 26th birthday. This became Deft's second time in the semi-finals, with his previous time being 8 years ago during the Season 4 World Championship.

Faker and Deft met as T1 and DRX captains in the World Championship final in the U.S. on November 5, 2022. DRX won the Season 12 World Championship, winning against T1 3–2. Deft was the oldest professional player to win the League of Legends World Championship before Faker broke his record on November 19, 2023. "The important thing is an unbreakable heart," which was left in an interview with a media outlet by Deft, who defeated T1 at the time and lifted the trophy for the first time in his career, emerged as a buzzword, citing the Korean national soccer team that participated in the Qatar World Cup.

=== Dplus Kia (2023) ===
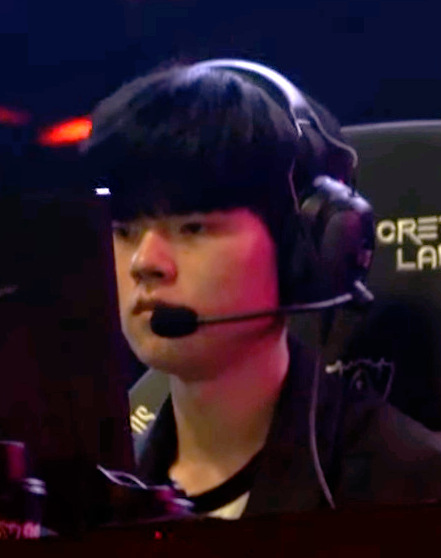
Deft at the 2023 World Championship Swiss stage

On November 24, 2022, Deft joined Damwon Kia alongside Canna, Canyon, ShowMaker, and Kellin. Both Spring and Summer were in poor form, finishing fifth, but they were in good form in the League of Legends World Championship selection and participated in the League of Legends World Championship as the LCK's fourth seed. Ultimately they were defeated by KT Rolster in their last Swiss Stage match, preventing them to reach the quarterfinals in the Knockout Stage.

=== Return to KT Rolster (2024) ===
Deft returned to KT Rolster in 2024, citing a desire to play with old DRX teammates BeryL and Pyosik. They were joined by veteran Bdd in the mid lane and rookie PerfecT in the top lane. In August 2024, Deft left the team in order to start his mandatory military service, enlisting the following year.

== National team career ==
In June 2026, Deft was appointed as a League of Legends national team performance analyst for 2026.

== Seasons overview ==
Year	Team	Domestic				Regional	International	
Year	Team	League	Split			Rift Rivals	Mid-Season Invitational	World Championship
Year	Team	League	Winter	Spring	Summer	Rift Rivals	Mid-Season Invitational	World Championship
2013	MVP Blue	Champions	—	11th–12th	9th–12th	—N/a	—N/a	Did not qualify
2014	Samsung Blue	Champions	5th–8th	1st	2nd	—N/a	—N/a	3rd–4th
2015	Edward Gaming	LPL	—N/a	1st	4th	—N/a	1st	5th–8th
2016	Edward Gaming	LPL	—N/a	2nd	1st	—N/a	Did not qualify	5th–8th
2017	KT Rolster	LCK	—N/a	2nd	3rd	2nd	Did not qualify	Did not qualify
2018	KT Rolster	LCK	—N/a	3rd	1st	2nd	Did not qualify	5th–8th
2019	DRX (Note: Known as Kingzone DragonX (2019) and DragonX (2020).)	LCK	—N/a	3rd	7th	1st	Did not qualify	Did not qualify
2020	DRX	LCK	—N/a	3rd	2nd	—N/a	None held (Note: Cancelled due to the COVID-19 pandemic.)	5th–8th
2021	Hanwha Life Esports	LCK	—N/a	3rd	8th	—N/a	Did not qualify	5th–8th
2022	DRX	LCK	—N/a	5th	6th	—N/a	Did not qualify	1st
2023	Dplus KIA	LCK	—N/a	5th	5th	—N/a	Did not qualify	9th–11th
2024	KT Rolster	LCK	—N/a	5th	5th	—N/a	Did not qualify	Did not qualify

== Awards and honors ==
International

- One-time Worlds champion – 2022
- One-time Mid-Season Invitational champion – 2015
- One-time Rift Rivals champion – 2019

LCK

- Two-time LCK champion – Spring 2014, Summer 2018
- Three-time LCK Second All-Pro Team – Spring 2023
- Three-time LCK Third All-Pro Team – Spring 2020, Summer 2020, Spring 2022
- One-time Meme of the Year – 2022

LPL

- Two-time LPL champion – Spring 2015, Summer 2016
- One-time LPL MVP of the Year – 2016
- One-time LPL AD Carry of the Year – 2016

KeSPA

- One-time KeSPA Cup champion – 2017

Tencent

- Four-time Demacia Cup champion – Spring 2015, Summer 2015, Grand Finals 2015, 2016

== Personal life ==
Deft was born on October 23, 1996. He attended middle school at Sangam Middle School. He attended high school at Mapo High School and was a classmate of Lee "Faker" Sang-hyeok (who he would face in the 2022 League of Legends World Championship final). Deft dropped out of high school, but later received a high school diploma after passing his high school graduation qualification examination.

Prior to going professional in 2011, Deft played League of Legends on the North American server; his favourite champion is Jinx. He also used to play Sudden Attack. Deft is a fan of Tottenham Hotspur F.C. and Son Heung-min.

In 2018, he was selected as one of the torch relay runners for the 2018 PyeongChang Winter Olympics, alongside his fellow kt Rolster teammates.

== Notes ==
Awards and achievements
Preceded by Edward Gaming	League of Legends World Championship winner 2022; With: Kingen, Pyosik, Zeka, Deft, BeryL	Succeeded by T1
Preceded by New championship	Mid-Season Invitational winner 2015	Succeeded by SK Telecom T1
