= Effort (gamer) =

South Korean esports player (born 2000)

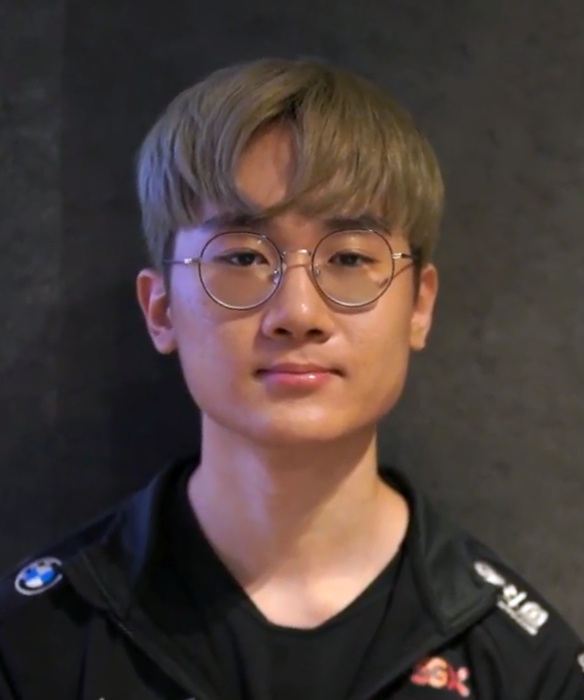
- Effort in 2020

Personal information
- Name: 이상호 (Lee Sang-ho)
- Nationality: South Korean

Current team
- Team: KT Rolster
- Role: Support
- Game: League of Legends
- League: LCK

Team history
- 2017–2020: T1 (Note: Known as SK Telecom T1 from 2014 to 2019.)
- 2021: Liiv Sandbox
- 2022: Nongshim RedForce
- 2023–2024: OK BRION (Note: Known as Fredit BRION (to January 2023) and BRION (to May 2023).)
- 2024: OK BRION Challengers
- 2026: KT Challengers
- 2026–present: KT Rolster

Career highlights and awards
- 2× LCK champion

Lee Sang-ho (Korean: 이상호; born November 23, 2000), better known as Effort (Korean: 에포트), is a South Korean professional League of Legends player for KT Rolster. He made his debut on KeSPA Cup 2017. He was an online trainee of SK Telecom T1 for 7 months before officially joining the team. Effort is well known for his exceptional play on Pyke.

== Early life ==
He stated in an interview that he used to watch a lot of StarCraft games. His in-game name, Effort, was named after a StarCraft player, Kim "EffOrt" Jung Woo, his favourite player.

He started playing League of Legends during his first year of his secondary school. His role model is Lee "Wolf" Jae-wan, former support player for SK Telecom T1.

== Career ==
=== Season 7 ===
SK Telecom T1 announced that they had signed Effort, who was previously a trainee of the team. Effort made his debut on KeSPA Cup 2017 on November 29, 2017. His first match was with Griffin, and his first champion used in his professional career was Blitzcrank. He won his first game against Griffin.

=== Season 8 ===
Effort became the starting supporter for SK Telecom T1 in the LCK Spring 2018. He played his first LCK game against ROX Tigers, which he won with a match score of 2–1. In the same season, he played his first playoffs in his career. SK Telecom T1 ended up at 4th place in the Spring season. SKT received 7th place in the Summer season, and 4th place in the Korea Regional Finals, which made them failed to qualify for 2018 League of Legends World Championship.

=== Season 9 ===
Effort played his first game of the season in the LCK Summer 2019. His first win of the season was against kt Rolster, where he started as the support player for the second match, breaking the five-game losing streak of SKT in Summer 2019. He became the starting player of the team since then.

He played his second playoffs in his career in Summer 2019. He had his first appearance on stage in the LCK finals on August 31, 2019. He won his first LCK title against Griffin on the same day with a match score of 3–1. His team had qualified as the first seed for LCK in the 2019 League of Legends World Championship, and he was selected as one of the members to represent SK Telecom T1 in World Championship.

=== Season 10 ===
On April 25, 2020, Effort and his team won the LCK Spring split finals against Gen.G with a match score of 3–0. This was his second LCK title.

On December 1, 2020, T1 announced the departure of their four-year Support player, Effort. Liiv Sandbox then announced that Effort will be joining them as their new Support player.

== Accomplishments ==
Year	Team	Event	Place
2017	SK Telecom T1	KeSPA Cup 2017	3rd–4th
2018	SK Telecom T1	League of Legends Champions Korea Spring 2018	4th
2018	SK Telecom T1	League of Legends Champion Korea Summer 2018	7th
2018	SK Telecom T1	Korea Regional Finals 2018	4th
2019	SK Telecom T1	League of Legends Champions Korea Summer 2019	1st
2019	SK Telecom T1	League of Legends World Championship 2019	3rd–4th
2020	T1	KeSPA Cup 2019	3rd–4th
2020	T1	League of Legends Champions Korea Spring 2020	1st
2020	T1	2020 Mid-Season Cup	7th–8th
2020	T1	League of Legends Champions Korea Summer 2020	5th
2020	T1	Korea Regional Finals 2020	2nd
2020	Liiv Sandbox	KeSPA Cup 2020	5th–6th
2021	Liiv Sandbox	League of Legends Champions Korea Spring 2021	8th
2021	Liiv Sandbox	League of Legends Champions Korea Summer 2021	5th
