= Gumayusi =

South Korean League of Legends player

- Gumayusi in 2026

Personal information
- Name: 이민형 (Lee Min-hyeong)
- Born: February 6, 2002 (age 24); Jeonju, South Korea

Current team
- Team: Hanwha Life Esports
- Role: AD Carry
- Game: League of Legends
- League: LCK

Team history
- 2018: KeG Seoul
- 2018–2025: T1
- 2026–present: Hanwha Life Esports

Career highlights and awards
- 3× World champion (2023, 2024, 2025); Worlds Finals MVP (2025); MSI champion (2026); Esports World Cup champion (2024); LCK champion; 3x LCK Bottom of the Year; 2× LCK First All–Pro Team; 3x LCK Third All–Pro Team
Medal record
Esports
Representing South Korea
Asian Games
Gold medal – first place	2026 Aichi-Nagoya	League of Legends
IeSF Esports World Championship
Gold medal – first place	2018 Kaohsiung	League of Legends

Lee Min-hyeong (Korean: 이민형; born February 6, 2002), better known as Gumayusi (Korean: 구마유시) or simply Guma, is a South Korean professional League of Legends player for Hanwha Life Esports. Starting off as a trainee for T1, he went on to win three consecutive League of Legends World Championships (2023–2025), including winning a World Championship Finals MVP in 2025 before leaving T1 to join Hanwha Life Esports (HLE) for the 2026 season. As a member of HLE, he went on to win the 2026 Mid-Season Invitational.

Gumayusi won one LCK title in 2022 and one Esports World Cup title in 2024. He represented the South Korean national team at the 2026 Asian Games, earning a gold medal.

== Career ==
=== Early career (2018) ===
On December 18, 2018, Gumayusi played in KeSPA Cup 2018 under the amateur team, KeG Seoul. His team defeated pro LCK team Hanwha Life Esports with a match score of 2–1.

=== T1 (2018–2025) ===
In December 2018, it was announced that Gumayusi joined SK Telecom T1 under the name "Catan". During his time as trainee, he and four other trainees from T1, Canna, Ellim, Mask, and Kuri, competed in the 2019 LoL Amateur Tournament. The team was called 'T1 Rookies', and they won the tournament. On November 26, 2019, T1 announced that Gumayusi was called up to the main roster.

Gumayusi made his debut in the LCK at the 2020 Regional Finals. His debut match was against Afreeca Freecs, which he won with a match score of 3–1. On November 24, 2020, Gumayusi re-signed with T1.

On January 13, 2021, Gumayusi played his first game of the season in LCK Spring 2021. He served as the main player of the roster for the first time in his career. The game was against Hanwha Life Esports. Gumayusi got his first pentakill in his career in the match against DWG KIA. He achieved the milestone with Aphelios. Gumayusi was included in the roster for the 2021 League of Legends World Championship, in which he and his teammates ended the journey in the semifinals. On December 3, 2021, Gumayusi re-signed with T1.

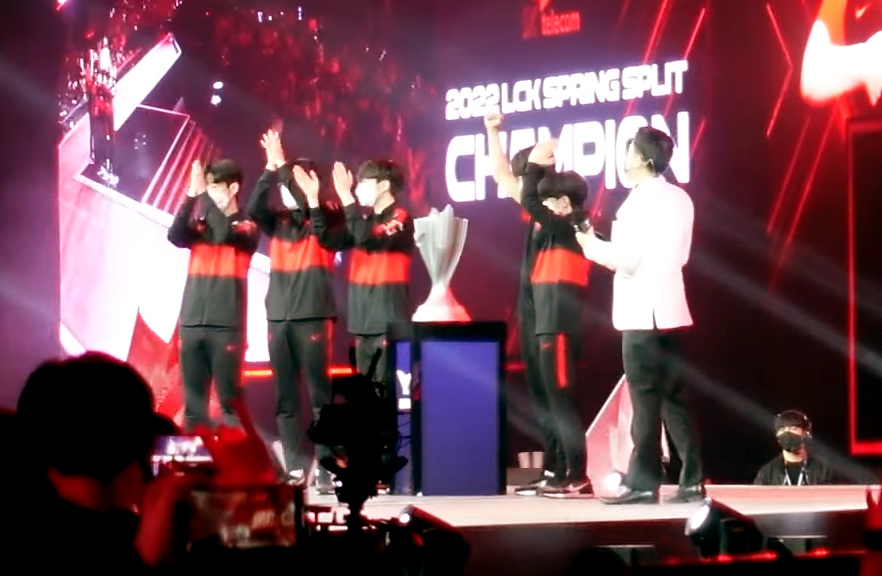
Gumayusi winning his 1st LCK title

In the 2022 LCK season, Gumayusi broke the record of the player with the most kills in a season, setting the record to 219 kills. He was also a member of the team that went undefeated in the regular season with a 18-0 record, becoming the first team to achieve this record in the LCK. Gumayusi won his first LCK title with his teammates in the 2022 LCK Spring finals.

In 2023, Gumayusi and T1 reached the LCK Spring Finals, where they lost to Gen. G. With finishing second place but qualified for the Mid-Season Invitational as the second seed, they got defeated 3–2 by JD Gaming and 3–1 by Bilibili Gaming to exit the Mid-Season Invitational at the loser-bracket final. T1 finished second in the LCK Summer Finals in another rematch against GenG, with the most championship points in the LCK. The team qualified for the 2023 World Championship, marking Gumayusi's third Worlds appearance. At Worlds, Gumayusi and T1 won their fourth Worlds title on November 19, 2023. After going 3-1 in the Swiss Stage, Gumayusi and T1 entered the Knockout Stage, where they first defeated the LPL second seed, LNG Esports 3-0 in the quarterfinals. After defeating tournament favorites JD Gaming 3-1 in the semifinals, Gumayusi and T1 defeated Weibo Gaming in the finals 3-0, marking Gumayusi's first World Championship and T1's fourth. On November 23, 2023, Gumayusi re-signed with T1.

At the 2024 League of Legends World Championship, Gumayusi and T1 won the tournament, marking T1's fifth World Championship and Gumayusi's second.

During the new LCK Cup in 2025, Gumayusi was benched and replaced by the T1 Academy ADC Sin "Smash" Geumjae after 5 games.. T1 did not qualify for the tournament's first stand, and he stayed benched until the regular Spring round. Gumayusi was not fully active; he and Smash were deployed alternately until the 14th of April. After the pressure of fans and T1's CEO Joe Marsh's intervention, the coach team let Gumayusi be the main ADC again with no official announcement. T1 finished the split with 11 wins and 7 losses, placing them third in the rankings after Gen.G and Hanwha Life Esports. Gumayusi and T1 qualified for MSI 2025 after they beat Hanwha Life Esports with a dominant 3-0 win, earning the second seed, during Road to MSI 2025. T1 advanced to semifinals at MSI 2025, beating CFO and BLG. They met Gen.G at semifinals and lost 2-3 and dropped to the lower brackets, meeting AL. With a 3-2 win, Gumayusi and T1 enter the finals to meet Gen.G for a second time. Ultimately, the team lost 2-3 again, ending up as runner-ups. 2025 LCK second round introduced a new system, where all teams are put in two groups depending on their standing in the previous round. Due to T1 ending the Spring round in third place, they are put in the "Legends" group and kept their placement until the end of the round. With their standings, Gumayusi and T1 were automatically qualified for the playoffs for 2025 World Championship. With a loss to HLE, T1 dropped to the lower bracket's quarterfinals and lost to Gen.G. Because an LCK team won MSI 2025, four LCK teams can participate at Worlds 2025. After the loss to Gen.G, T1 qualified for Worlds 2025 as the forth seed.

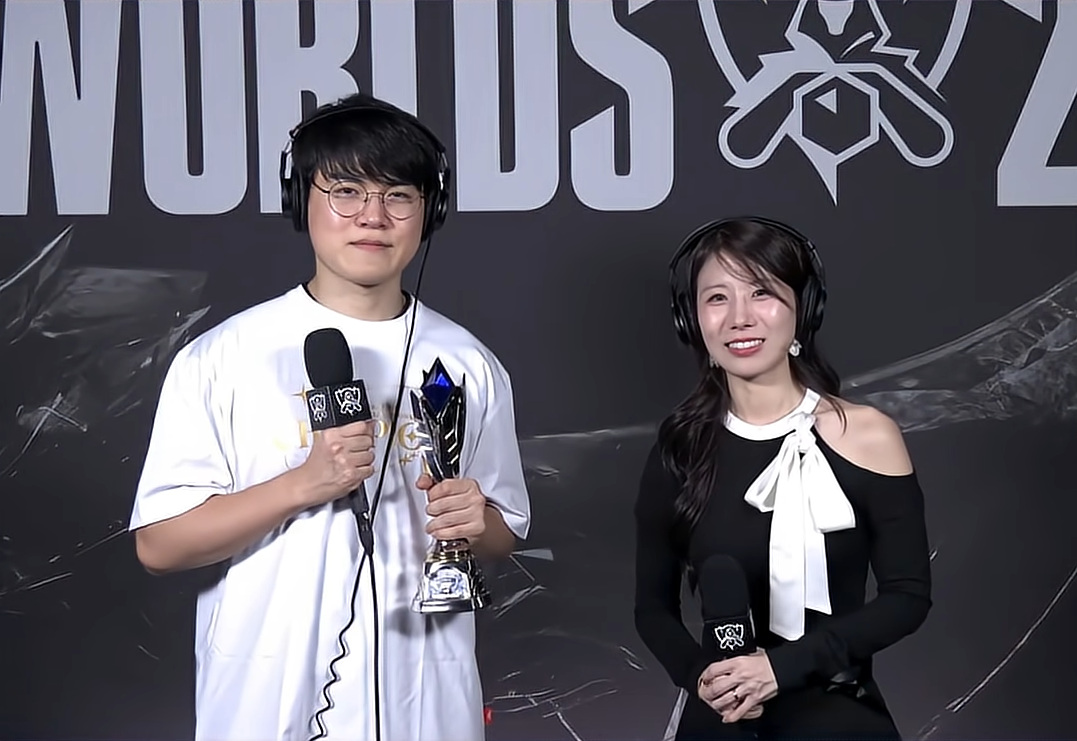
Guyamusi (left) with his 2025 Worlds Finals MVP trophy

At the 2025 World Championship, Gumayusi and T1 won their sixth Worlds title on November 9, 2025 after defeating KT Rolster with a close 3-2 win. He was named tournament MVP after the finals by Hall of Legends inductee Uzi due to his strong plays with Miss Fortune, Kalista, and Varus. Gumayusi will receive two skins, one for winning with T1 and a prestige skin for receiving the MVP award. His choices are Miss Fortune and Yunara. He becomes the player with the second-most skins after Faker.

On November 17, 2025, T1 announced that Gumayusi had left the team.

=== Hanwha Life Esports (2026–present) ===
On November 23, 2025, HLE announced that Gumayusi joined the team for the LCK 2026 season.

== Personal life ==
Lee Min-hyeong was born in South Korea on February 6, 2002. He is the younger brother of Lee "INnoVation" Shin-hyung, a South Korean former professional StarCraft II player. Lee, a 40th generation descendant of the Gyeongju Lee clan, is a distant nephew of Lee "Faker" Sang-hyeok, his former T1 teammate and organization's part-owner. Lee is a Christian.

Lee's role model is Uzi.

== Seasons overview ==
Year	Team	Domestic					International		
Year	Team	League	Split				First Stand	Mid-Season Invitational	World Championship
Year	Team	League	Cup	Spring	Summer	Season Playoffs	First Stand	Mid-Season Invitational	World Championship
2021	T1	LCK	—N/a	4th	2nd	—N/a	—N/a	Did not qualify	3rd–4th
2022	T1	LCK	—N/a	1st	2nd	—N/a	—N/a	2nd	2nd
2023	T1	LCK	—N/a	2nd	2nd	—N/a	—N/a	3rd	1st
2024	T1	LCK	—N/a	2nd	3rd	—N/a	—N/a	3rd	1st
			—N/a	Round 1-2	Round 3-5	—N/a	—N/a		
2025	T1	LCK	5th	3rd	3rd	4th	Did not qualify	2nd	1st
2026	HLE	LCK	10th	1st	2nd	2nd	Did not qualify	1st	9th–11th

== Awards and honors ==
International

- Three-time Worlds champion – 2023, 2024, 2025
  - One-time Worlds Finals MVP – 2025
- One-time Mid-Season Invitational champion – 2026
- One-time Esports World Cup champion – 2024

LCK

- One-time LCK champion – Spring 2022
- Three-time LCK Bottom of the Year – 2023, 2024, 2025
- Two-time LCK All-Pro 1st Team – Spring 2022, Spring 2023
- Three-time LCK All-Pro 3rd Team – Spring 2024, 2025 Season, 2026 Season
- Two-time LCK Gold King Award – 2022, 2023

South Korea Esports

- Asian Games gold medal winner – 2026
- IeSF Esports World Championship champion – 2018

Awards and achievements
Preceded by Lee "Faker" Sang-hyeok	League of Legends World Championship Finals MVP; 2025	Succeeded by Incumbent
