= Oner (gamer) =

South Korean esports player

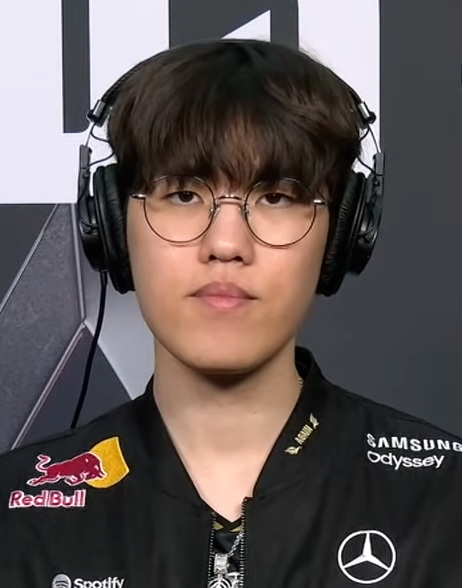
- Oner in 2025

Personal information
- Name: 문현준 (Moon Hyeon-jun)
- Born: December 24, 2002 (age 23); Gwangju, South Korea
- Nationality: South Korean

Current team
- Team: T1
- Role: Jungler
- Game: League of Legends
- League: LCK

Career information
- Playing career: 2020–present

Team history
- 2020: T1 Academy
- 2021–present: T1

Career highlights and awards
- 3× World champion (2023, 2024, 2025); Esports World Cup champion (2024); LCK champion; LCK Finals MVP; 4× LCK Jungle of the Year; LCK First All-Pro Team; 4× LCK Second All-Pro Team; LCK Third All-Pro Team; KeSPA Cup champion (2025)

Moon Hyeon-jun (Korean: 문현준; born December 24, 2002), better known as Oner, (Note: Korean: 오너) is a South Korean professional League of Legends player for T1. Throughout his career, he has won one League of Legends Champions Korea (LCK) title and three League of Legends World Championship titles.

Oner began his career in 2020 as a member of T1 Academy, the developmental team of T1. He was promoted to the main roster for the 2021 LCK season. While he only received some playing time in the 2021 Spring Split, since then, Oner has reached six LCK Finals, including a win in the 2022 Spring Split. He reached the Finals of the World Championship in his first year as a starter, and the following three years, he won the 2023, 2024 and 2025 editions of the World Championship.

Oner's individual accomplishments include accolades such as an LCK Finals MVP award, four LCK Jungler of the Year awards, and one LCK First All-Pro Team designations.

== Professional career ==
In 2020, Oner was signed to T1 Academy, the developmental team of T1. After turning 17 on January 31, 2021, he made his LCK debut on February 21 in a win over Liiv SANDBOX in the 2021 LCK Spring Split regular season.

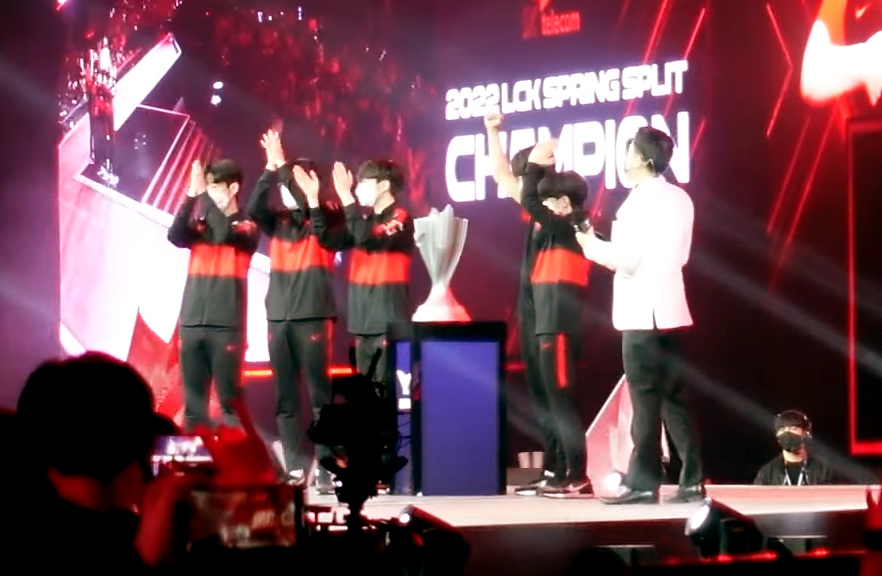
Oner winning his 1st LCK title

In the 2022 LCK Spring Split regular season, Oner was a member of the T1 team that went undefeated in the regular season with a 18–0 record, becoming the first team to achieve this record in the LCK. Moon won his first LCK title in the 2022 LCK Spring finals.

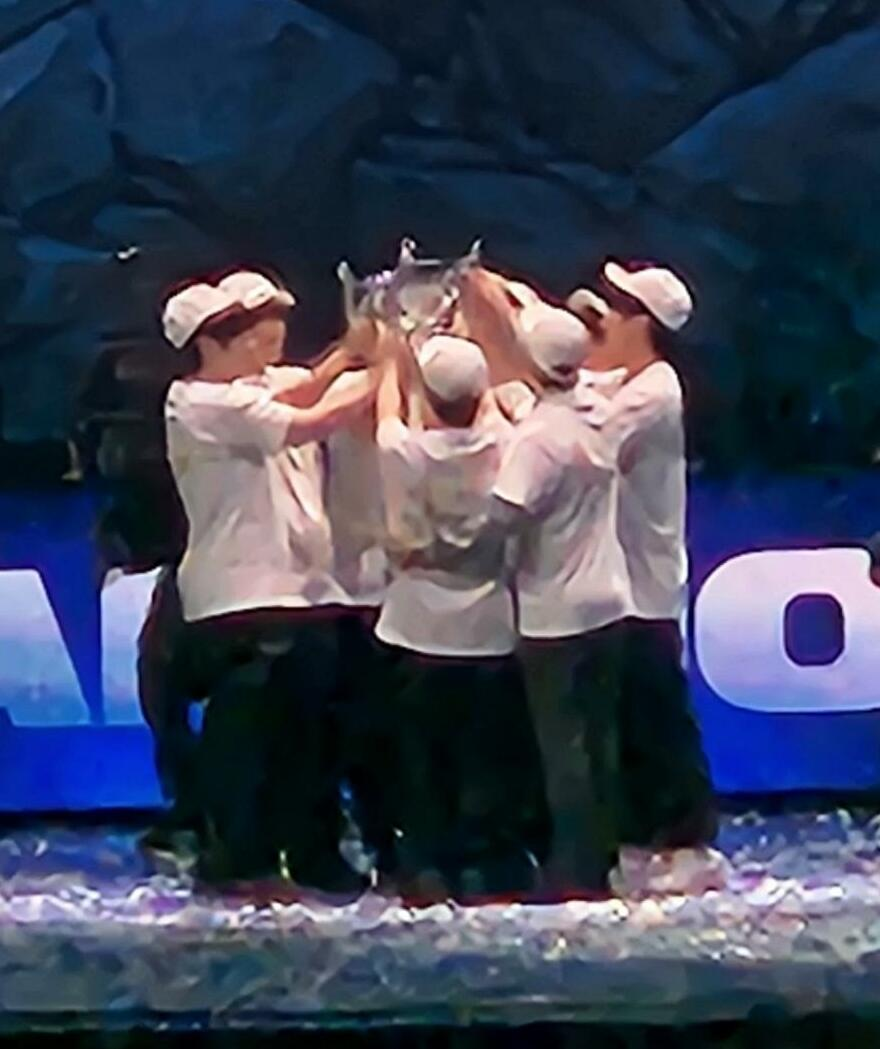
Oner celebrating after winning the 2023 World Championship

Moon and T1 reached 2023 LCK Spring finals, where they lost to Gen.G. By finishing second place, T1 qualified for the 2023 Mid-Season Invitational as the second seed, where they were defeated 3–2 by JD Gaming and 3–1 by Bilibili Gaming, exiting the Mid-Season Invitational at the loser-bracket final. T1 finished second in the 2023 LCK Summer Finals in another rematch against Gen.G. With the most championship points in the LCK, the team qualified for the 2023 World Championship, marking Oner's third Worlds appearance. T1 won their fourth Worlds title on November 19, 2023, after defeating Weibo Gaming in the finals by 3–0 score.

In the Spring Split of the LCK, T1 finished with a regular season record of 15–3, placing second behind Gen.G (which went 17–1). In the Spring Playoffs, T1 reached the finals but lost to Gen.G, finishing as runner-up of the split. As a result of their placement, they qualified for the mid-season international competition. At the 2024 Mid‑Season Invitational (MSI), T1 entered from the LCK and progressed through the play-in stage and bracket stage. In the bracket stage they defeated G2 Esports and Team Liquid but ultimately lost in the Lower-Bracket Final to Bilibili Gaming (3–2) and took third place overall. During the Summer Split, T1's performance declined relative to spring: they ended the regular season 11–7, placing 4th. In the Summer Playoffs, they defeated KT Rolster in Round 1, but were then swept 0–3 by Hanwha Life Esports in Round 2. They fought through the lower bracket, defeated Dplus KIA, but were eliminated after a 1–3 loss to Hanwha Life in the Lower-Bracket Final. At Worlds 2024, which was held in Berlin, Paris and London, Oner and T1 became the tournament champions, defeating Bilibili Gaming 3–2 in the Grand Final. This title represented their record-extending fifth World Championship for the organisation as well as the second World Championship in a row. Their route to qualification and the final reflected a resilience despite their weaker domestic summer showing.

With T1 heading into the 2025 season with a new top laner, Oner and the roster qualified as the second LCK seed for the 2025 Mid-Season Invitational after defeating Hanwha Life Esports 3–0 in the Road to MSI bracket. There, the team ultimately made it to their fifth MSI final in the organization's history, but fell short after losing to fellow LCK representative Gen.G 3–2 in a close series. In the second part of the newly revamped LCK season the team comfortably secured a spot in the 2025 LCK playoffs, where they qualified to the 2025 League of Legends World Championship after defeating Dplus KIA in round 2 of the lower bracket. The team qualified for the play-in stage of the World Championship as the fourth and final seed from the LCK, after losing to Gen.G 3–2 in round 3 of the lower bracket which ended their run in the LCK playoffs. At the World Championship, the team defeated Invictus Gaming 3–1 in the play-in stage to qualify for the Swiss stage. Despite a poor start to the Swiss stage, they qualified to the knockout stage with an overall 3–2 record after defeating 100 Thieves and Movistar KOI in the latter rounds. In the knockout stage, the team eliminated the last two remaining teams from China's LPL defeating Anyone's Legend in the quarterfinals in a close 3–2 scoreline, and Top Esports in the semifinals with a dominant 3–0 sweep. Oner and T1 defeated fellow LCK representatives KT Rolster with a 3–2 scoreline to win the organization's third consecutive Worlds title.

== Seasons overview ==
Year	Team	Domestic					International		
Year	Team	League	Split				First Stand	Mid-Season Invitational	World Championship
Year	Team	League	Cup	Spring	Summer	Season Playoffs	First Stand	Mid-Season Invitational	World Championship
2021	T1	LCK	—N/a	4th	2nd	—N/a	—N/a	Did not qualify	3rd–4th
2022	T1	LCK	—N/a	1st	2nd	—N/a	—N/a	2nd	2nd
2023	T1	LCK	—N/a	2nd	2nd	—N/a	—N/a	3rd	1st
2024	T1	LCK	—N/a	2nd	3rd	—N/a	—N/a	3rd	1st
2025	T1	LCK	5th	—N/a	—N/a	4th	Did not qualify	2nd	1st
2026	T1	LCK	4th	—N/a	—N/a	3rd	Did not qualify	5th–6th	3rd–4th

== Awards and honors ==
International

- Three-time Worlds champion – 2023, 2024, 2025
- One-time Esports World Cup champion – 2024

LCK

- One-time LCK champion – Spring 2022
- One-time LCK Finals MVP – Spring 2022
- Four-time Jungle of the Year – 2022, 2023, 2024, 2025
- One-time LCK All-Pro 1st Team – Spring 2023
- Four-time LCK All-Pro 2nd Team – Spring 2022, Summer 2022, Spring 2024, 2025 Season
- One-time LCK All-Pro 3rd Team – Summer 2024
