= Kkoma =

South Korean gamer (born 1985)

kkOma
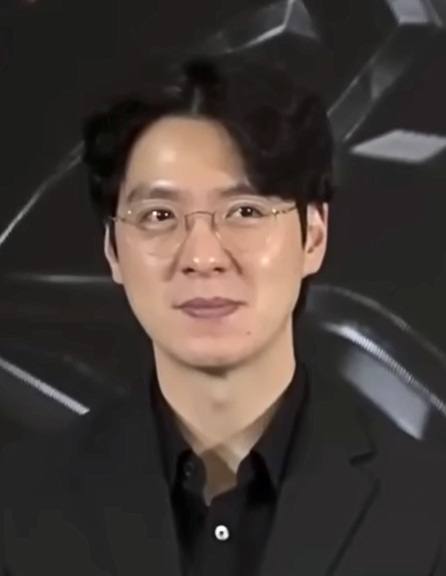
- kkOma in 2025

Personal information
- Name: 김정균 (Kim Jeong-gyun)
- Born: December 23, 1985 (age 40)
- Nationality: South Korean

Career information
- Game: League of Legends
- Playing career: 2012
- Role: Jungler
- Coaching career: 2012–2021, 2023–present

Team history

As player:
- 2012: StarTale

As coach:
- 2012–2019: T1 (Note: Known as SK Telecom T1 2 in 2013, SK Telecom T1 K in 2014, and SK Telecom T1 from 2014 to 2019.)
- 2020: Vici Gaming
- 2021: DWG KIA
- 2024–present: T1
- As administrator
- 2022: DWG KIA

Career highlights and awards
- As coach: 5× World champion (2013, 2015, 2016, 2024, 2025); 2× MSI champion (2016, 2017); Esports World Cup champion (2024); 10× LCK champion; 2× KeSPA Cup champion (2020, 2025); IEM champion (2016); Rift Rivals champion (2019); All-Star Invitational champion (2014); NLB champion (2014)
Medal record
Esports
Representing South Korea (as coach)
Asian Games
| Gold medal – first place | 2022 Hangzhou | League of Legends |

Kim Jeong-gyun (Korean: 김정균; born December 23, 1985), better known as kkOma, is a South Korean professional League of Legends coach, currently head coach for T1. As the coach of SK Telecom T1 and later DWG KIA, kkOma is a five-time world champion, two-time Mid-Season Invitational champion, and ten-time LCK champion. kkOma is widely considered the greatest coach in League of Legends history. He is known for his strict coaching attitude and aptitude for developing talented rookies. He was also a World Championship finalist in 2017 and 2021. He is the winner of the "Esports Coach of the Decade" prize at the Esports Awards 2025.

Prior to becoming a coach, kkOma enjoyed a short professional career in esports. He competed in StarCraft II competing under the ID "LittleBoy" for "Team Old Generations". After unsuccessful attempts to qualify for Global StarCraft II League, he quit Starcraft II and competed for one season of League of Legends Champions Korea for the team "Startale". He played as the jungler for Startale.

kkOma is the first and one of only two coaches who own a ward skin in League of Legends (SKT T1 kkOma Ward, released in 2017), the other coach being Im "Tom" Jae-hyeon, also from T1 (T1 Tom Ward, released in 2026).

He was the head coach of Korea's Asian Games 2022 League of Legends team.

== Professional career ==
=== SK Telecom T1 ===
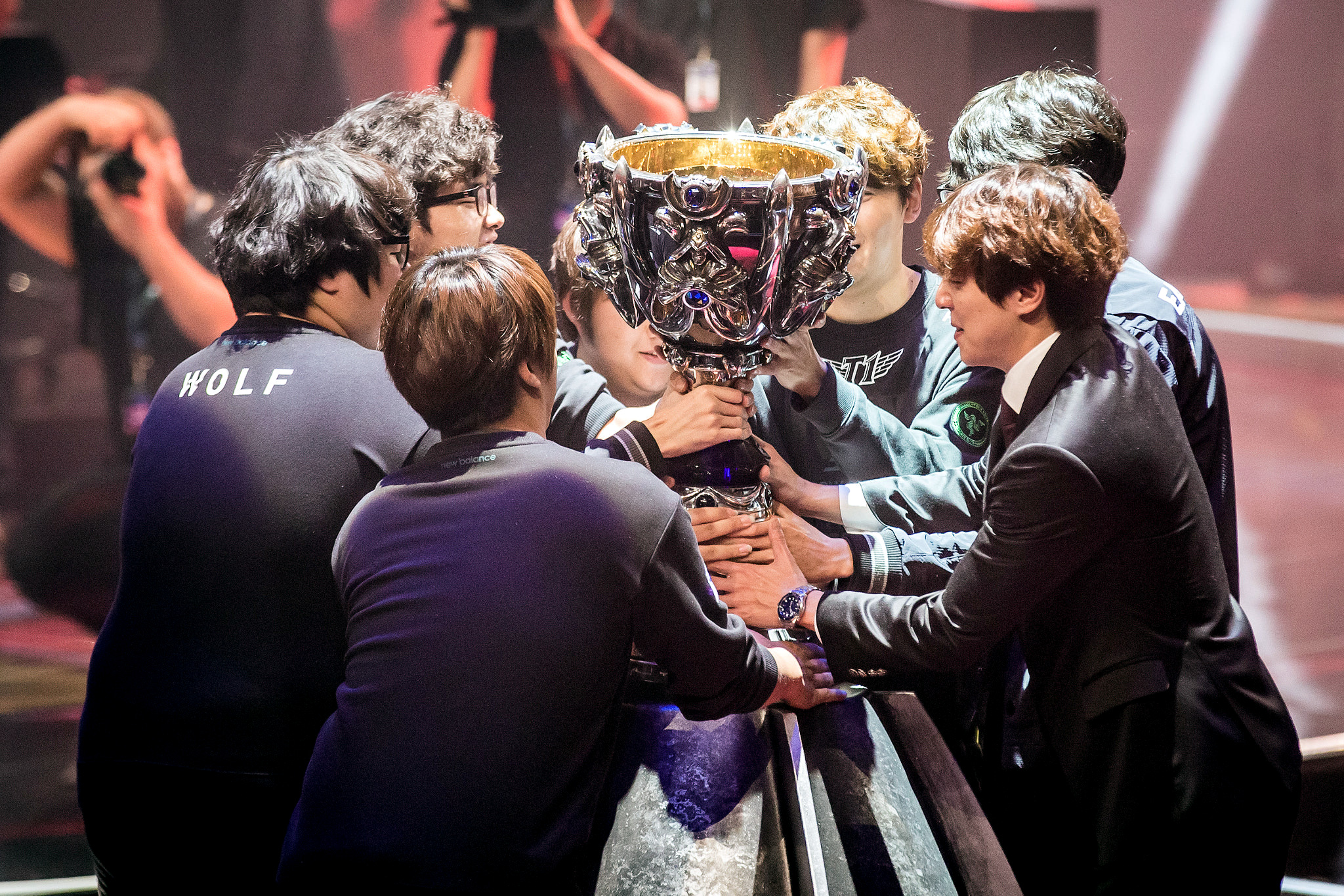
Kkoma celebrating after winning the 2015 World Championship.

In 2012, SKT T1 named kkOma as a coach for their League of Legends team in preparation for the upcoming 2013 Season 3. kkOma recruited players Faker, Bengi, Piglet, Impact, and PoohManDu to form the original SKT T1 team. kkOma and his team had won the Champions Summer 2013 and the 2013 World Championship.

Following a relatively disappointing Season 4, SKT T1 bounced back in 2015 Season 5. In 2015, kkOma was among the first coach to successfully implement two players equally sharing the same role, by having Faker and Easyhoon share the mid lane position. This allowed SKT T1 to adopt diverse play styles depending on which player was swapped in. kkOma would lead his team to sweep the calendar year by winning LCK Spring 2015, LCK Summer 2015, and the 2015 World Championship, becoming the first coach to win more than one World Championships.

Kkoma became the head coach of T1 in November 2017. kkOma successfully led his team to the seventh LCK title on 13 April 2019, marking his first LCK title as the head coach.

On 27 November 2019, it was announced that kkOma would leave SKT T1.

=== Vici Gaming ===
On 17 December 2019, Vici Gaming announced that kkOma joined the team as their head coach. He parted ways with Vici Gaming in September 2020 due to family reasons.

=== DWG KIA ===
In November 2020, kkOma was being reported as the new head coach of DWG KIA (formerly Damwon Gaming) after the departure of their coaches, Yang “Daeny” Dae-in and Kim “Zefa” Jae-min.

During the 2021 season, kkOma and his team were runners up in the 2021 Mid-Season Invitational, and the 2021 League of Legends World Championship.

In December 2021, kkOma was promoted to the role of athletic director within the DWG KIA organization.

=== Return to T1 ===
On 21 November, 2023, T1 announced kkOma's return to the organization as the head coach.

== National team career ==
In March 2022, the Korea Esports Association (KeSPA) announced the appointment of kkOma as the head coach for the South Korean League of Legends team for the 2022 Asian Games.

== Personal life ==
In late 2019, Kkoma announced his marriage. He has 2 children.
