= Bdd (gamer) =

South Korean esports player (born 1999)

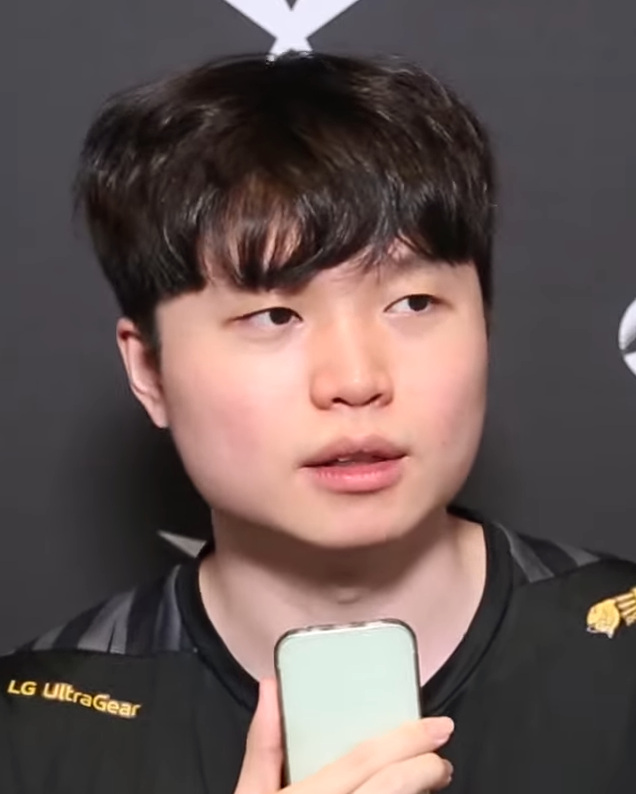
- Bdd in 2021

Personal information
- Name: Kwak Bo-seong
- Born: March 1, 1999 (age 27)
- Nationality: South Korean

Current team
- Team: KT Rolster
- Role: Mid lane
- Game: League of Legends
- League: LCK

Career information
- Playing career: 2015–present

Team history
- 2016: CJ Entus
- 2017–2018: Kingzone DragonX (Note: Known as Longzhou Gaming in 2017.)
- 2019: KT Rolster
- 2020–2021: Gen.G
- 2022: Nongshim RedForce
- 2023–present: KT Rolster

Career highlights and awards
- 2× LCK champion; 3× LCK season MVP; 2x LCK All–Pro First Team; LCK Player of the Year (2025)

Gwak Bo-seong (Korean: 곽보성, born March 1, 1999), better known as Bdd, is a South Korean professional League of Legends player for KT Rolster. He is a two-time LCK regular season MVP, receiving the title in the 2017 summer and 2018 spring splits.

Bdd's signature champions are considered to be Galio, Azir, Taliyah, Orianna and his favourite champion is Zed.

== Career ==
Bdd stands for bapdoduk (밥도둑), which means "rice thief".

Bdd joined CJ Entus as a substitute mid laner in April 2015 but was unable to play for them due to being underage. Bdd was hyped as a "super-rookie" and the biggest Korean mid laner prospect after Faker before his debut. He finally turned 17 on March 1, 2016, and he made his competitive debut in the 2016 LCK Spring on March 2 in a series against Kongdoo Monster, which CJ won 2–1. He finished the first competitive season at 8th place. CJ Entus had a very poor showing in the 2016 LCK Summer season, going 3-15 total in set score and being relegated for the first time in the team's history. Bdd along with all other members left the team after the season.

In December 2016, Bdd announced his signing with Longzhu Gaming. However, he spent the 2017 LCK Spring season on the bench. He was moved into the starting spot in the summer season and won the 2017 LCK Summer playoff as well as the regular season MVP with 1300 points, and set an all-time record of 11.3 KDA throughout the entire season over 44 games.

In January 2017, Longzhu Gaming was acquired by a Chinese company and rebranded into KING-ZONE DragonX. Bdd won the regular season MVP and playoff again in 2018 LCK Spring season. He and his team represented Korea for Mid-Season Invitational but they only managed to get runner-up disappointingly. KING-ZONE DragonX finished summer season at 4th place and failed to quality for 2018 World Championship after losing to Gen.G in regional qualifier.

On November 27, 2018, kt Rolster announced the singing of Bdd as their new mid laner. KT struggled in 2019 season and finished only at 9th and 8th place in spring and summer season. He left the team after a disappointing year in November 2019.

On November 20, 2019, Gen.G announced the signing of Bdd along with jungler Clid and top laner Rascal as their new members through former Gen.G player and world champion Ambition's twitch stream. Both Bdd and Clid signed a 3 years contract with the team.

Bdd won regular season MVP the 3rd time with 1200 points in 2020 LCK Spring season. Gen.G finished the regular season at 1st place but got swept by T1 in Spring playoff final. Bdd had a strong showing at 2020 Mid-Season Cup and won player of the game 3 times. Gen.G was the only Korean team to make it out of groups, but was eliminated by Top Esports in the semifinal. In the summer season, Bdd again won MVP for the 4th time in his career with 1200 points. Gen.G fell short in playoff by losing to DragonX and finished the season at 3rd place.

== Seasons overview ==
Year	Team	Domestic					Regional	International		
Year	Team	League	Split				Rift Rivals	First Stand	Mid-Season Invitational	World Championship
Year	Team	League	Cup	Spring	Summer	Season Playoffs	Rift Rivals	First Stand	Mid-Season Invitational	World Championship
2016	CJ Entus	LCK	—N/a	8th	10th	—N/a	—N/a	—N/a	Did not qualify	Did not qualify
2017	Kingzone DragonX	LCK	—N/a	7th	1st	—N/a	Did not qualify	—N/a	Did not qualify	5th–8th
2018	Kingzone DragonX	LCK	—N/a	1st	4th	—N/a	2nd	—N/a	2nd	Did not qualify
2019	KT Rolster	LCK	—N/a	9th	8th	—N/a	Did not qualify	—N/a	Did not qualify	Did not qualify
2020	Gen.G	LCK	—N/a	2nd	3rd	—N/a	—N/a	—N/a	None held (Note: Cancelled due to the COVID-19 pandemic.)	5th–8th
2021	Gen.G	LCK	—N/a	2nd	3rd	—N/a	—N/a	—N/a	Did not qualify	3rd–4th
2022	Nongshim RedForce	LCK	—N/a	8th	8th	—N/a	—N/a	—N/a	Did not qualify	Did not qualify
2023	KT Rolster	LCK	—N/a	3rd	3rd	—N/a	—N/a	—N/a	Did not qualify	5th–8th
2024	KT Rolster	LCK	—N/a	5th	5th	—N/a	—N/a	—N/a	Did not qualify	Did not qualify
2025	KT Rolster	LCK	6th	—N/a	—N/a	3rd	—N/a	Did not qualify	Did not qualify	2nd
2026	KT Rolster	LCK	9th	—N/a	—N/a	5th	—N/a	Did not qualify	Did not qualify	Did not qualify
