= 2023 LCK season =

Twelfth season of South Korea's League of Legends Champions Korea

- League: LCK
- Sport: League of Legends
- Duration: 18 January – 9 April (Spring); 7 June – 20 August (Summer)
- Teams: 10

Spring
- Season champions: Gen.G
- Runners-up: T1
- Season MVP: Ryu "Keria" Min-seok

Summer
- Season champions: Gen.G
- Runners-up: T1
- Season MVP: Son "Lehends" Si-woo

LCK seasons
- ← 2022 2024 →

The 2023 LCK season was the twelfth season of South Korea's LCK, a professional esports league for the MOBA PC game League of Legends. The season was divided into two splits: Spring and Summer. The Spring Split began on 18 January and culminated with the playoff finals on 9 April 2023. The Summer Split began on 7 June and culminated with the Summer Split finals on 20 August 2023.

The Spring Split winners, Gen.G, and runners-up, T1, qualified for the 2023 Mid-Season Invitational. Gen.G also won the Summer Split, directly qualifying them for the 2023 World Championship. T1 qualified for the 2023 World Championship via Championship Points, while both KT Rolster and Dplus Kia also qualified for the 2023 World Championship through the regional qualifier.

== Format ==
The regular season format was double round-robin. The games were played five days per week for both round robins.

Starting from the 2023 season, LCK introduced new format for the playoffs, where double elimination would be applied starting from the semifinals. LCK also eliminated the rules for call-up and send-down between LCK and LCK Challengers League from this season.

== Spring ==
The Spring Split regular season ran from 18 January to on 19 March 2023. The top six teams from the regular season advanced to the playoffs, which took place from 22 March to 9 April 2023. The finals took place at the Jamsil Indoor Stadium in Seoul. The top two teams from the playoffs qualified for the 2023 Mid-Season Invitational.

=== Regular season ===
Pos	Team	Pld	W	L	PCT	Qualification
1	T1	18	17	1	.944	Advance to upper semifinals
2	Gen.G	18	13	5	.722	Advance to upper semifinals
3	KT Rolster	18	13	5	.722	Advance to upper quarterfinals
4	Dplus Kia	18	12	6	.667	Advance to upper quarterfinals
5	Hanwha Life Esports	18	10	8	.556	Advance to upper quarterfinals
6	Liiv Sandbox	18	10	8	.556	Advance to upper quarterfinals
7	Kwangdong Freecs	18	6	12	.333	
8	Fredit Brion	18	4	14	.222	
9	DRX	18	3	15	.167	
10	Nongshim RedForce	18	2	16	.111	

Source: LoL Esports

=== Playoffs ===
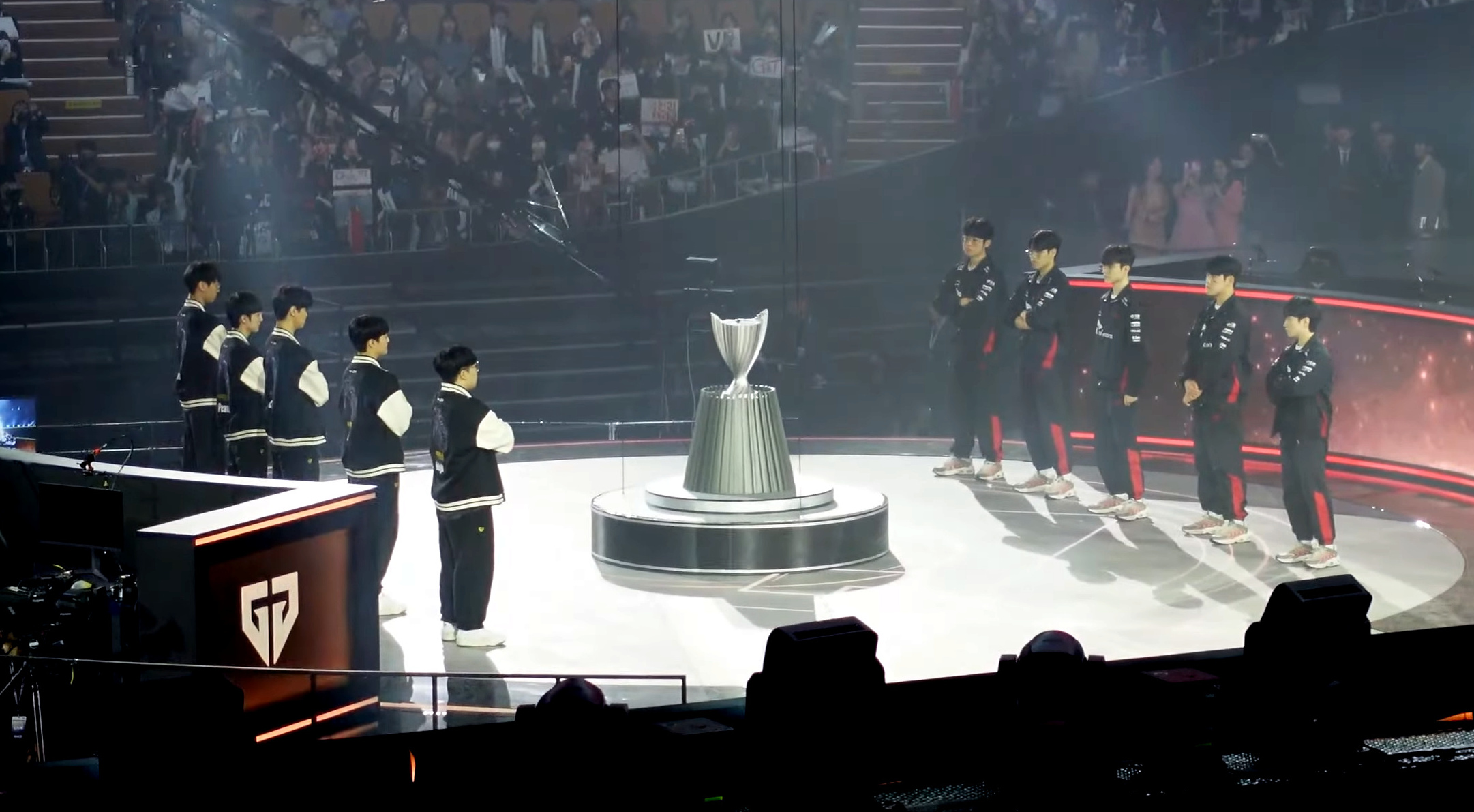
Gen.G and T1 played in the Spring Finals match.

Upper quarterfinals
3	KT Rolster	3
6	Liiv Sandbox	1
4	Dplus Kia	1
5	Hanwha Life Esports	3

Upper semifinals
1	T1	3
3	KT Rolster	2
2	Gen.G	3
5	Hanwha Life Esports	1
Lower semifinals
3	KT Rolster	3
5	Hanwha Life Esports	1

Upper final
1	T1	3
2	Gen.G	1
Lower final
2	Gen.G	3
3	KT Rolster	1

Final
1	T1	1
2	Gen.G	3

== Summer ==
The Summer Split regular season began on 7 June. The top six teams from the regular season advanced to the playoffs, which took place from 22 March to 9 April 2023. The top six teams from the regular season advanced to the playoffs, which took place from 8 to 20 August 2023. The finals took place at the Daejeon Convention Center in Yuseong-gu, Daejeon.

=== Regular season ===
Pos	Team	Pld	W	L	PCT	Qualification
1	KT Rolster	18	17	1	.944	Advance to upper semifinals
2	Gen.G	18	16	2	.889	Advance to upper semifinals
3	Hanwha Life Esports	18	12	6	.667	Advance to upper quarterfinals
4	Dplus Kia	18	11	7	.611	Advance to upper quarterfinals
5	T1	18	9	9	.500	Advance to upper quarterfinals
6	DRX	18	6	12	.333	Advance to upper quarterfinals
7	Liiv Sandbox	18	5	13	.278	
8	Fredit Brion	18	5	13	.278	
9	Nongshim RedForce	18	5	13	.278	
10	Kwangdong Freecs	18	4	14	.222	

Source: LoL Esports

=== Playoffs ===
Upper quarterfinals
3	Hanwha Life Esports	3
6	DRX	0
4	Dplus Kia	1
5	T1	3

Upper semifinals
1	KT Rolster	2
5	T1	3
2	Gen.G	3
3	Hanwha Life Esports	0
Lower semifinals
1	KT Rolster	3
3	Hanwha Life Esports	0

Upper final
2	Gen.G	3
5	T1	2
Lower final
5	T1	3
1	KT Rolster	2

Final
2	Gen.G	3
5	T1	0

== World Championship qualification ==
=== Championship points ===
Pos	Team	Spr	Sum	Total	Qualification
1	Gen.G	90	AQ	AQ	2023 World Championship
2	T1	70	100	170	2023 World Championship
3	KT Rolster	50	80	130	Advance to regional qualifier upper final
4	Hanwha Life Esports	30	50	80	Advance to regional qualifier upper final
5	Dplus Kia	20	30	50	Advance to regional qualifier lower semifinal
6	DRX	0	10	10	Advance to regional qualifier lower semifinal
7	Liiv Sandbox	10	0	10	
8	Kwangdong Freecs	0	0	0	
9	Nongshim RedForce	0	0	0	
10	Fredit Brion	0	0	0	

Source: 2023 LCK Rulebook

=== Regional qualifier ===
The regional qualifier was a tournament consisting of the top four teams in the LCK based on championship points that had not directly qualified for the 2023 World Championship. The top two teams faced off, and the winner earned a spot in the World Championship. Simultaneously, the bottom two teams played against each other, with the losing team being eliminated. The remaining two teams then competed for the last LCK spot in the 2023 World Championship.

Upper final	Advance to World Championship
3	KT Rolster	3
KT Rolster
4	Hanwha Life Esports	1
Lower semifinal	Lower final	Advance to World Championship
4	Hanwha Life Esports	1
Dplus Kia
5	Dplus Kia	3	5	Dplus Kia	3
6	DRX	0

Source: LoL Esports

== Awards ==
Spring

- Most Valuable Player: Keria, T1
- 1st Team All-Pro:
  - T Zeus, T1
  - J Oner, T1
  - M Faker, T1
  - B Gumayusi, T1
  - S Keria, T1
- 2nd Team All-Pro:
  - T Kiin, KT Rolster
  - J Peanut, Gen.G
  - M Chovy, Gen.G
  - B Deft, Dplus KIA
  - S Kellin, Dplus KIA
- 3rd Team All-Pro:
  - T Doran, Gen.G
  - J Canyon, Dplus KIA
  - M Bdd, KT Rolster
  - B Peyz, Gen.G
  - S Lehends, KT Rolster

Summer

- Most Valuable Player: Lehends, KT Rolster
- 1st Team All-Pro:
  - T Kiin, KT Rolster
  - J Cuzz, KT Rolster
  - M Bdd, KT Rolster
  - B Aiming, KT Rolster
  - S Lehends, KT Rolster
- 2nd Team All-Pro:
  - T Doran, Gen.G
  - J Peanut, Gen.G
  - M Chovy, Gen.G
  - B Peyz, Gen.G
  - S Delight, Gen.G
- 3rd Team All-Pro:
  - T Zeus, T1
  - J Canyon, Dplus KIA
  - M Zeka, Hanwha Life Esports
  - B Viper, Hanwha Life Esports
  - S Life, Hanwha Life Esports

Season

- Player of the Year: Faker, T1
- Positional Players of the Year:
  - Top: Zeus, T1
  - Jungle: Oner, T1
  - Mid: Faker, T1
  - Bottom: Gumayusi, T1
  - Support: Keria, T1
- Sponsorship Awards:
  - Secret Lab Assist King Award: Delight, Gen.G
  - Best Monster Slayer Award: Peanut, Gen.G
  - Logitech G Best Power Play Award: Deft, Dplus
  - JW Pharmaceutical Vision Award: Kael, Liiv Sandbox
  - OP.GG Search King Award: Faker, T1
  - LG Ultragear Objective Steal Award: Cuzz, KT Rolster
  - LCK Global Marketing Award: Morgan, Fredit Brion
  - HP Omen Best KDA Award: Aiming, KT Rolster
  - BBQ First Blood Award: Oner, T1
  - Woori WON Banking Gold King Award: Gumayusi, T1
- LCK 10th Anniversary Award: Seong Seung-heon and CloudTemplar
- Best Showmanship Award: Kwangdong Freecs
- Meme of the Year: CloudTemplar

== Broadcast ==
The LCK was broadcast at the following platforms:

- Korean: Naver, Afreeca TV, YouTube
- English: Twitch, YouTube
- Chinese: HuyaTV
- French: OTP
- Vietnam: YouTube, Facebook
- Japan: Twitch
