= 2022 LCK season =

Eleventh season of South Korea's League of Legends Champions Korea

- League: LCK
- Sport: League of Legends
- Duration: 12 January – 2 April (Spring); 15 June – 28 August (Summer)
- Teams: 10

Spring
- Season champions: T1
- Runners-up: Gen.G
- Season MVP: Ryu "Keria" Min-seok (T1)

Summer
- Season champions: Gen.G
- Runners-up: T1
- Season MVP: Park "Ruler" Jae-hyuk (Gen.G)

LCK seasons
- ← 2021 2023 →

The 2022 LCK season was the 11th season of the League of Legends Champions Korea (LCK), a South Korean professional esports league for the MOBA PC game League of Legends. The season was divided into two splits: Spring and Summer. The Spring Split began on 12 January and culminated with the Spring Split Final on 2 April 2022. The Summer Split began on 15 June and culminated with the Summer Split Final on 28 August 2022.

T1 won the Spring Split, qualifying them for the 2022 Mid-Season Invitational. Gen.G won the Summer Split, directly qualifying them for the 2022 World Championship. T1 qualified for the 2022 World Championship via Championship Points, while both DWG KIA and DRX also qualified for the 2022 World Championship through the regional qualifier.

== Format ==
The regular season format was double round robin. The games were played five days per week for both round robins.

== Spring ==
The spring split began on 12 January and finished on 20 March, immediately followed by the spring playoffs, which concluded with the spring finals, where T1 defeated Gen.G with a match score of 3–1 on 2 April. T1 represented the LCK in the 2022 Mid-Season Invitational, losing out to defending champions Royal Never Give Up 3–2 in the finals.

=== Regular season ===
| Pos | Team | Pld | W | L | PCT | Qualification |
|---|---|---|---|---|---|---|
| 1 | T1 | 18 | 18 | 0 | 1.000 | Advance to semifinals |
| 2 | Gen.G | 18 | 15 | 3 | .833 | Advance to semifinals |
| 3 | DWG KIA | 18 | 11 | 7 | .611 | Advance to quarterfinals |
| 4 | DRX | 18 | 11 | 7 | .611 | Advance to quarterfinals |
| 5 | Kwangdong Freecs | 18 | 8 | 10 | .444 | Advance to quarterfinals |
| 6 | Fredit Brion | 18 | 8 | 10 | .444 | Advance to quarterfinals |
| 7 | KT Rolster | 18 | 7 | 11 | .389 | |
| 8 | Nongshim RedForce | 18 | 5 | 13 | .278 | |
| 9 | Liiv Sandbox | 18 | 4 | 14 | .222 | |
| 10 | Hanwha Life Esports | 18 | 3 | 15 | .167 | |

Source: LoL Esports

=== Playoffs ===
Quarterfinals
DWG KIA | 3
Fredit Brion | 0
DRX | 2
Kwangdong Freecs | 3

Semifinals
T1 | 3
Kwangdong Freecs | 0
Top seed selects opponent
Gen.G | 3
DWG KIA | 2

Final
T1 | 3
Gen.G | 1

=== Awards ===
- Most Valuable Player: Keria, T1
- Player of the Split: Canyon, DWG KIA
- 1st Team All-Pro:
  - T Zeus, T1
  - J Canyon, DWG KIA
  - M Faker, T1
  - B Gumayusi, T1
  - S Keria, T1
- 2nd Team All-Pro:
  - T Rascal, KT Rolster
  - J Oner, T1
  - M Chovy, Gen.G
  - B Ruler, Gen.G
  - S BeryL, DRX
- 3rd Team All-Pro:
  - T Kiin, Kwangdong Freecs
  - J Peanut, Gen.G
  - M ShowMaker, DWG KIA
  - B Deft, DRX
  - S Lehends, Gen.G

== Summer ==
=== Regular season ===
| Pos | Team | Pld | W | L | PCT | Qualification |
|---|---|---|---|---|---|---|
| 1 | Gen.G | 18 | 17 | 1 | .944 | Advance to semifinals |
| 2 | T1 | 18 | 15 | 3 | .833 | Advance to semifinals |
| 3 | Liiv Sandbox | 18 | 13 | 5 | .722 | Advance to quarterfinals |
| 4 | DWG KIA | 18 | 10 | 8 | .556 | Advance to quarterfinals |
| 5 | KT Rolster | 18 | 10 | 8 | .556 | Advance to quarterfinals |
| 6 | DRX | 18 | 9 | 9 | .500 | Advance to quarterfinals |
| 7 | Kwangdong Freecs | 18 | 6 | 12 | .333 | |
| 8 | Nongshim RedForce | 18 | 5 | 13 | .278 | |
| 9 | Fredit Brion | 18 | 3 | 15 | .167 | |
| 10 | Hanwha Life Esports | 18 | 2 | 16 | .111 | |

Source: LoL Esports

=== Playoffs ===
Quarterfinals
Liiv Sandbox | 3
DRX | 1
DWG KIA | 3
KT Rolster | 2

Semifinals
Gen.G | 3
Liiv Sandbox | 1
Top seed selects opponent
T1 | 3
DWG KIA | 2

Final
Gen.G | 3
T1 | 0

=== Awards ===
- Most Valuable Player: Ruler, Gen.G
- Players of the Split: Ruler, Gen.G & Prince, Liiv Sandbox
- Rookie of the Year: Vicla, KT Rolster
- Best Coach: Score, Gen.G
- 1st Team All-Pro:
  - T Zeus, T1
  - J Peanut, Gen.G
  - M Chovy, Gen.G
  - B Ruler, Gen.G
  - S Lehends, Gen.G
- 2nd Team All-Pro:
  - T Doran, Gen.G
  - J Oner, T1
  - M Faker, T1
  - B Prince, Liiv Sandbox
  - S Keria, T1
- 3rd Team All-Pro:
  - T Rascal, KT Rolster
  - J Croco, Liiv Sandbox
  - M Clozer, Liiv Sandbox
  - B Aiming, KT Rolster
  - S Kael, Liiv Sandbox

== World Championship qualification ==
=== Championship points ===
| Pos | Team | Spr | Sum | Total | Qualification |
|---|---|---|---|---|---|
| 1 | Gen.G | 70 | AQ | AQ | 2022 World Championship |
| 2 | T1 | 90 | 100 | 190 | 2022 World Championship |
| 3 | DWG KIA | 50 | 50 | 100 | Advance to regional qualifier upper final |
| 4 | Liiv Sandbox | 0 | 80 | 80 | Advance to regional qualifier upper final |
| 5 | KT Rolster | 0 | 30 | 30 | Advance to regional qualifier lower semifinal |
| 6 | DRX | 20 | 10 | 30 | Advance to regional qualifier lower semifinal |
| 7 | Kwangdong Freecs | 30 | 0 | 30 | |
| 8 | Fredit Brion | 10 | 0 | 10 | |
| 9 | Nongshim RedForce | 0 | 0 | 0 | |
| 10 | Hanwha Life Esports | 0 | 0 | 0 | |

Source: 2022 LCK Rulebook

=== Regional qualifier ===
The regional qualifier was a tournament consisting of the top four teams in the LCK based on championship points that had not directly qualified for the 2022 World Championship. The top two teams faced off, and the winner earned a spot in the World Championship. Simultaneously, the bottom two teams played against each other, with the losing team being eliminated. The remaining two teams then competed for the last LCK spot in the 2022 World Championship.

Upper final | Advance to World Championship
3 | DWG KIA | 3
DWG KIA
4 | Liiv Sandbox | 1
Lower semifinal | Lower final | Advance to World Championship
4 | Liiv Sandbox | 2
DRX
5 | KT Rolster | 2 | 6 | DRX | 3
6 | DRX | 3

Source: LoL Esports

== Broadcast ==
The LCK was broadcast at the following platforms:

- Korean: Naver, Afreeca TV, Twitch
- English: Twitch
- Chinese: HuyaTV
- French: OTP
- Vietnam: YouTube
