= 2024 LCK season =

13th season of South Korea's League of Legends Champions Korea

- League: LCK
- Sport: League of Legends
- Duration: 17 January – 14 April (Spring); 12 June – 8 September (Summer); 12 – 14 September (Regional qualifier)
- Teams: 10

Spring
- Season champions: Gen.G
- Runners-up: T1
- Season MVP: Chovy (Gen.G)

Summer
- Season champions: Hanwha Life Esports
- Runners-up: Gen.G
- Season MVP: Chovy (Gen.G)

LCK seasons
- ← 2023 2025 →

The 2024 LCK season was the 13th season of the League of Legends Champions Korea (LCK), a professional South Korean esports league for the MOBA PC game League of Legends. The season is divided into two splits: Spring and Summer. The Spring Split began on 17 January 2024 and culminated with the playoff finals on 14 April. The Summer Split began on 12 June and ended with the Summer Grand Final on 8 September.

After finishing the Spring regular season at the top of the table, Gen.G defeated T1 in the Spring Grand Final with a score of 3–2 to win their fourth LCK split in a row; both teams qualified for the 2024 Mid-Season Invitational. Gen.G once again led the Summer regular season, but were defeated in the Summer Grand Final by Hanwha Life Esports with a score of 3–2 in an upset victory.

Hanwha Life Esports directly qualified to the 2024 World Championship by winning the Summer split, while Gen.G qualified via Championship Points. Through the regional qualifier, Dplus KIA and T1 also qualified, as the third and fourth LCK seeds respectively.

== League changes ==
=== Teams ===
Liiv Sandbox rebranded its esports team FearX heading into the 2024 season, which became BNK FearX on 23 May in time for the Summer Split.

=== Salary cap ===
In response to financial challenges faced by LCK organizations, such as Gen.G's CEO Arnold Hur revealing that his team had "never turned a profit" despite leading in sponsorship revenue, the LCK implemented a hard salary cap for starting rosters and a luxury tax system for the 2024 season. The salary cap will be calculated based on the total salary paid to the starting roster, excluding substitutes or benched players. It consists of a minimum level, set at 70% of a team's revenue earned in 2022, and an upper limit. Teams exceeding the maximum cap will incur a luxury tax, which will be redistributed to teams that stayed within the limit. However, to be eligible for a share of the luxury tax, teams must reach the minimum level of the salary cap. There is no individual cap on a player's salary, only for the entire team, and there are exceptions and bonuses based on player achievements.

== Spring ==
The Spring Split regular season ran from 17 January to 24 March 2024. The 10 teams played a total of 90 games, and all regular season games were played in a best-of-three format. The top six teams from the regular season advanced to the playoffs, which took place from 30 March to 14 April 2024. The two finalists, Gen.G and T1, advanced to the 2024 Mid-Season Invitational.

=== Regular season ===
| Pos | Team | Pld | W | L | PCT | Qualification |
|---|---|---|---|---|---|---|
| 1 | Gen.G | 18 | 17 | 1 | .944 | Advance to upper semifinals |
| 2 | T1 | 18 | 15 | 3 | .833 | Advance to upper semifinals |
| 3 | Hanwha Life Esports | 18 | 15 | 3 | .833 | Advance to upper quarterfinals |
| 4 | KT Rolster | 18 | 11 | 7 | .611 | Advance to upper quarterfinals |
| 5 | Dplus Kia | 18 | 9 | 9 | .500 | Advance to upper quarterfinals |
| 6 | Kwangdong Freecs | 18 | 7 | 11 | .389 | Advance to upper quarterfinals |
| 7 | FearX | 18 | 6 | 12 | .333 | |
| 8 | Nongshim RedForce | 18 | 4 | 14 | .222 | |
| 9 | DRX | 18 | 3 | 15 | .167 | |
| 10 | OKSavingsBank Brion | 18 | 3 | 15 | .167 | |

Source: LoL Esports

=== Playoffs ===
Upper quarterfinals
3 | Hanwha Life Esports | 3
6 | Kwangdong Freecs | 0
4 | KT Rolster | 2
5 | Dplus Kia | 3

Upper semifinals
1 | Gen.G | 3
5 | Dplus KIA | 2
Top seed selects opponent
2 | T1 | 0
3 | Hanwha Life Esports | 3
Lower semifinals
5 | Dplus KIA | 0
2 | T1 | 3

Upper final
1 | Gen.G | 3
3 | Hanwha Life Esports | 1
Lower final
3 | Hanwha Life Esports | 1
2 | T1 | 3

Final
1 | Gen.G | 3
2 | T1 | 2

Source: LoL Esports

== Summer ==
The Summer Split followed the same format as the Spring Split. The regular season ran from 12 June to 18 August, and the top six teams advanced to the playoffs, which took place from 23 August to 8 September.

The Grand Final was held at the Gyeongju Indoor Stadium on 8 September, where Hanwha Life Esports defeated Gen.G with a score of 3–2, automatically qualifying them to the 2024 World Championship. This was their first LCK title since joining the league in 2018. It also ended the possibility of Gen.G achieving the "Golden Road", after they had won both the 2024 Spring Split and Mid-Season Invitational.

=== Regular season ===
| Pos | Team | Pld | W | L | PCT | Qualification |
|---|---|---|---|---|---|---|
| 1 | Gen.G | 18 | 17 | 1 | .944 | Advance to upper semifinals |
| 2 | Hanwha Life Esports | 18 | 14 | 4 | .778 | Advance to upper semifinals |
| 3 | Dplus Kia | 18 | 13 | 5 | .722 | Advance to upper quarterfinals |
| 4 | T1 | 18 | 11 | 7 | .611 | Advance to upper quarterfinals |
| 5 | KT Rolster | 18 | 9 | 9 | .500 | Advance to upper quarterfinals |
| 6 | BNK FearX | 18 | 8 | 10 | .444 | Advance to upper quarterfinals |
| 7 | Kwangdong Freecs | 18 | 7 | 11 | .389 | |
| 8 | Nongshim RedForce | 18 | 5 | 13 | .278 | |
| 9 | DRX | 18 | 4 | 14 | .222 | |
| 10 | Ok SavingBank Brion | 18 | 2 | 16 | .111 | |

Source: LoL Esports

=== Playoffs ===
Upper quarterfinals
3 | Dplus Kia | 3
6 | BNK FearX | 1
4 | T1 | 3
5 | KT Rolster | 1

Upper semifinals
1 | Gen.G | 3
3 | Dplus Kia | 0
Top seed selects opponent
2 | Hanwha Life Esports | 3
4 | T1 | 0
Lower semifinals
3 | Dplus Kia | 1
4 | T1 | 3

Upper final
1 | Gen.G | 3
2 | Hanwha Life Esports | 1
Lower final
2 | Hanwha Life Esports | 3
4 | T1 | 1

Final
1 | Gen.G | 2
2 | Hanwha Life Esports | 3

Source: LoL Esports

== World Championship qualification ==
=== Championship points ===
| Pos | Team | Spr | Sum | Total | Qualification |
|---|---|---|---|---|---|
| 1 | Hanwha Life Esports | 50 | AQ | AQ | 2024 World Championship |
| 2 | Gen.G | 90 | 100 | 190 | 2024 World Championship |
| 3 | T1 | 70 | 80 | 150 | Advance to regional qualifier upper Round 1 |
| 4 | Dplus Kia | 30 | 50 | 80 | Advance to regional qualifier upper Round 1 |
| 5 | KT Rolster | 20 | 30 | 50 | Advance to regional qualifier lower Round 1 |
| 6 | BNK FearX | 0 | 10 | 10 | Advance to regional qualifier lower Round 1 |
| 7 | Kwangdong Freecs | 10 | 0 | 10 | |
| 8 | Nongshim RedForce | 0 | 0 | 0 | |
| 9 | DRX | 0 | 0 | 0 | |
| 10 | Ok SavingBank Brion | 0 | 0 | 0 | |

Source: 2024 LCK Rulebook

=== Regional qualifier ===
The regional qualifier is a tournament consisting of the top four teams in the LCK based on championship points that had not directly qualified for the 2024 World Championship. The top two teams face off, and the winner earns a spot in the World Championship. The bottom two teams then play against each other, with the losing team being eliminated. The remaining two teams then compete for the last LCK spot in the 2024 World Championship. The three best-of-five matches were held over three consecutive days, from 12 to 14 September.

Round 1
3 | T1 | 2
4 | Dplus Kia | 3
5 | KT Rolster | 3
6 | FearX | 0

Round 2
3 | T1 | 3
5 | KT Rolster | 2

Advance to Worlds
Dplus Kia
T1

Source: LoL Esports

== Awards ==
Spring

- Most Valuable Player: Chovy, Gen.G
- Player of the Split: Chovy, Gen.G
- 1st Team All-Pro:
  - T Kiin, Gen.G
  - J Canyon, Gen.G
  - M Chovy, Gen.G
  - B Peyz, Gen.G
  - S Keria, T1
- 2nd Team All-Pro:
  - T Zeus, T1
  - J Oner, T1
  - M Faker, T1
  - B Viper, Hanwha Life Esports
  - S Lehends, Gen.G
- 3rd Team All-Pro:
  - T Doran, Hanwha Life Esports
  - J Peanut, Hanwha Life Esports
  - M Zeka, Hanwha Life Esports
  - B Gumayusi, T1
  - S Delight, Hanwha Life Esports

Summer

- Most Valuable Player: Peyz, Gen.G
- Player of the Split: Chovy, Gen.G
- Rookie of the Year: Lucid, Dplus Kia
- 1st Team All-Pro:
  - T Kiin, Gen.G
  - J Canyon, Gen.G
  - M Chovy, Gen.G
  - B Peyz, Gen.G
  - S Lehends, Gen.G
- 2nd Team All-Pro:
  - T Doran, Hanwha Life Esports
  - J Peanut, Hanwha Life Esports
  - M Zeka, Hanwha Life Esports
  - B Viper, Hanwha Life Esports
  - S Delight, Hanwha Life Esports
- 3rd Team All-Pro:
  - T Kingen, Dplus Kia
  - J Oner, T1
  - M Bdd, KT Rolster
  - B Aiming, Dplus Kia
  - S Keria, T1
