= 2025 LCK season =

- League: LCK
- Sport: League of Legends
- Duration: 15 January – 23 February (LCK Cup); 2 April – 15 June (Rounds 1–2 & Road to MSI); 23 July – 28 September (Rounds 3–5, play-ins, playoffs)
- Teams: 10

LCK Cup
- Champions: Hanwha Life Esports
- Runners-up: Gen.G
- Season MVP: Choi "Zeus" Woo-je (Hanwha Life Esports)

Road to MSI
- Qualified for MSI 2025: Gen.G (First Seed); T1 (Second Seed)

Playoffs
- Season Champions: Gen.G
- Runners-up: Hanwha Life Esports
- Season MVP: Park "Ruler" Jae-hyuk (Gen.G)

LCK seasons
- ← 2024 2026 →

The 2025 LCK season was the 14th season of the League of Legends Champions Korea (LCK), a South Korean professional esports league for the video game League of Legends. It was the first LCK season under the new three-split structure and competitive calendar introduced by the game's developer Riot Games starting with the 2025 competitive season.

Unlike past seasons, the 2025 LCK season introduced a new format divided into three parts, with the first being the LCK Cup, which will determine the region's lone representative at the 2025 First Stand Tournament. The next two parts are a merged regular season season divided into two halves. The first half will feature the first two rounds of the season, while the second half will feature the last three rounds of the season and the LCK Play-Ins and Playoffs to determine the Season Champion. The LCK Cup ran from 15 January to 23 February, while the regular season began on 2 April and ended on 28 September.

The LCK Cup was won by Hanwha Life Esports, defeating Gen.G with a 3–2 scoreline to qualify for the First Stand Tournament. In the first two rounds of the season, both teams led the standings, but only Gen.G qualified for the 2025 Mid-Season Invitational alongside T1, who defeated Hanwha Life Esports in the final MSI qualification match in a 3–0 sweep.

After the final three rounds, Gen.G topped the standings and became the LCK's first single-season champion, defeating Hanwha Life Esports with a score of 3–1 in the Season Finals. Both teams qualified for the 2025 League of Legends World Championship. KT Rolster and T1 also qualified as the third and fourth seeds respectively.

== League changes ==
=== Season structure and format ===
In line with Riot Games' announcement of a new split structure and competitive calendar for League of Legends esports beginning with the 2025 competitive season, the LCK announced on 29 October 2024 that the former Spring and Summer Splits would be merged into one season, with the 2025 Mid-Season Invitational in between them, and the creation of the LCK Cup to serve as a qualifier for the inaugural First Stand Tournament. Additionally, the last three rounds of the season taking place after MSI 2025 will feature a triple round-robin group stage and a season champion will be crowned, with results from Rounds 1 and 2 having implications for teams in Rounds 3 to 5.

=== Teams ===
Only one team change occurred heading into the 2025 season. On 26 December 2024, Kwangdong Freecs renamed to "DN Freecs" after signing a sponsorship deal with DN Group.

== LCK Cup ==
=== Draft and Format ===
The LCK Cup featured ten (10) competing teams. For the group stage, teams were divided into two groups of five teams – Group Baron and Group Elder, named after two in-game objectives, Baron Nashor and the Elder Dragon. In determining the teams in both groups, a draft was conducted on 6 January 2025. During the draft, the finalists from the 2024 LCK Summer Split, Hanwha Life Esports (HLE) and Gen.G (GEN) were assigned to Baron and Elder, respectively. As HLE were the Summer Split champions, they were given the first pick of the draft. HLE and GEN took turns to make their first selections, with those selections picking the next teams in their respective groups in a snake format until all teams were selected into specific groups. The following were the results of the draft per group:

Group Baron

- 1st pick by Hanwha Life Esports: T1
- 4th pick by T1: BNK FearX
- 5th pick by BNK FearX: DN Freecs
- 8th pick by DN Freecs: OKSavingsBank Brion

Group Elder

- 2nd pick by Gen.G: Dplus KIA
- 3rd pick by Dplus KIA: KT Rolster
- 6th pick by KT Rolster: Nongshim RedForce
- 7th pick by Nongshim RedForce: DRX

Each team will play cross matches against the other group in a single round-robin format, where all matches will be played in best-of-threes. Accumulated results of teams in their respective groups will be used to determine a Winners group and a Losers group. The top three (3) teams in the winners group will directly advance to the playoffs, while the fourth and fifth-ranked teams will join the top four (4) teams in the losers group in the play-in stage. The last-ranked team in the latter group will be eliminated.

The play-in stage featured six (6) teams in three rounds. The first round saw the third to sixth ranked teams according to their seeding in a single-elimination format. Winners of the two best-of-three series in this round advanced to a double-elimination bracket second round, where they faced the top two (2) seeded teams from the same crop of play-in teams; while losing first round teams were eliminated. The winners of the two second round series, also in best-of-threes, progressed to the playoffs. Meanwhile, the losing teams squared off against one another in a best-of-five third round to determine the final playoffs spot. Seeding for the first round were assigned based on a team's individual wins in the group stage regardless of group.

In the playoffs, six (6) teams were featured in a semi-double elimination format where the three teams from the play-in stage began in the first round alongside the third-ranked team from the winners group. The top two-ranked teams from the said group got an automatic bye into the second round. All matches were played in a best-of-five, with the winner of the LCK Cup representing the region as its lone representative at the 2025 First Stand tournament.

The LCK Cup implemented the "Fearless Draft" format, which was popularized by China's LoL Development League, where teams cannot pick a champion that they've already played in a series, even if the champion was picked by the opposing team. The tournament began on 15 January.

=== Group Stage ===
Group Baron

Total Wins: 9

Pos	Team	Pld	W	L	PCT	Qualification
1	T1	5	4	1	.800	Advance to play-ins
2	Hanwha Life Esports	5	3	2	.600	Advance to play-ins
3	OKSavingsBank Brion	5	1	4	.200	Advance to play-ins
4	DN Freecs	5	1	4	.200	Advance to play-ins
5	BNK FearX	5	0	5	.000	Eliminated

Updated to match(es) played on 2 February 2025. Source: LoL Esports

Group Elder

Total Wins: 16

Pos	Team	Pld	W	L	PCT	Qualification
1	Dplus KIA	5	5	0	1.000	Advance to playoffs
2	Gen.G	5	3	2	.600	Advance to playoffs
3	KT Rolster	5	3	2	.600	Advance to playoffs
4	DRX	5	3	2	.600	Advance to play-ins
5	Nongshim RedForce	5	2	3	.400	Advance to play-ins

Updated to match(es) played on 2 February 2025. Source: LoL Esports

=== Play-Ins ===
Round 1
7 February
Nongshim RedForce	2
OKSavingsBank Brion	0
7 February
DRX	2
DN Freecs	0

Round 2
4th Seed Playoff - 8 February
T1	2
Nongshim RedForce	0
5th Seed Playoff - 8 February
Hanwha Life Esports	2
DRX	0

6th Seed Playoff
9 February
Nongshim RedForce	3
DRX	1

Source: LoL Esports

=== Playoffs ===
Upper quarterfinals
12 February
3	KT Rolster	0
6	Nongshim RedForce	3
13 February
4	T1	2
5	Hanwha Life Esports	3

Upper semifinals
15 February
1	Dplus KIA	3
6	Nongshim RedForce	1
16 February
2	Gen.G	2
5	Hanwha Life Esports	3
Lower semifinals
20 February
6	Nongshim RedForce	2
2	Gen.G	3

Upper final
19 February
1	Dplus Kia	2
5	Hanwha Life Esports	3
Lower final
22 February
1	Dplus Kia	0
2	Gen.G	3

Final
23 February
5	Hanwha Life Esports	3
2	Gen.G	2

Source: LoL Esports

== Regular season ==
Prior to the Final of the 2025 First Stand Tournament on 16 March, Riot Games announced that Fearless Draft would continue to be used throughout the rest of the year, including with the LCK, instead of being exclusively used during the LCK Cup and First Stand.

=== Rounds 1–2 & Road to MSI ===
==== Format ====
Across nine weeks of competition, ten (10) competing teams participated in a double round-robin tournament, where all matches were played in best-of-threes, similar to the most-recent format for the Spring and Summer Splits of previous LCK seasons. The top six teams from these rounds participated in Road to MSI, with all matches being best-of-five. The top two (2) ranked teams from the first two rounds of the season contested the region's first seed at the 2025 Mid-Season Invitational. The four (4) remaining teams were seeded in a five-round single-elimination king-of-the hill tournament, with the fifth and sixth-ranked teams beginning in round one; the fourth-ranked team seeded in round two, and the third-ranked team seeded in round three. The loser of the first-seed playoff was relegated to the fifth round, in which the winner of such will earn the LCK's second seed at MSI 2025. Since the sole representative of the LCK at the First Stand Tournament, Hanwha Life Esports, won the entire event, the two teams that earned the LCK's two slots at MSI 2025 got byes to the Bracket Stage, skipping the Play-in Stage entirely.

On 24 March 2025, the LCK announced that the final three matches of Road to MSI will be held at the Sajik Arena in Busan from 13–15 June. The venue had previously hosted the quarterfinals and semifinals of the 2023 League of Legends World Championship.

==== Rounds 1–2 ====
Pos	Team	Pld	W	L	PCT	Qualification
1	Gen.G	18	18	0	1.000	MSI Seed 1 Qualification Match
2	Hanwha Life Esports	18	14	4	.778	MSI Seed 1 Qualification Match
3	T1	18	11	7	.611	Road to MSI; King-of-the-Hill Tournament
4	Nongshim RedForce	18	10	8	.556	Road to MSI; King-of-the-Hill Tournament
5	KT Rolster	18	10	8	.556	Road to MSI; King-of-the-Hill Tournament
6	Dplus Kia	18	10	8	.556	Road to MSI; King-of-the-Hill Tournament
7	BNK FearX	18	6	12	.333	
8	OKSavingsBank Brion	18	5	13	.278	
9	DRX	18	5	13	.278	
10	DN Freecs	18	1	17	.056	

Updated to match(es) played on June 1, 2025. Source: LoL Esports

===== Tiebreaker =====
KT Rolster and Dplus Kia had tiebreaker match on 4 June to determine the 5th and 6th seeds in Road to MSI. KT Rolster won the match with a 2-1 scoreline to secure the fifth seed and the last spot in Legend Group for Rounds 3-5.

===== LCK Road Show =====
On 7 March 2025, Gen.G and KT Rolster announced that two separate matches featuring their teams would be held at the Suwon Convention Center from 3–4 May, as part of a two-day "2025 LCK Road Show". Gen.G faced Dplus Kia on 3 May as part of the Gen.G Homestand event, while a match between KT Rolster and T1 was held during the KT Homecoming event on the next day.

==== Road to MSI ====
Round 1
5	KT Rolster	3
6	Dplus KIA	0

Round 2
4	Nongshim RedForce	0
5	KT Rolster	3

Round 3
1	Gen.G	3
2	Hanwha Life Esports	2
3	T1	3
5	KT Rolster	1

Round 4
2	Hanwha Life Esports	0
3	T1	3

=== Rounds 3–5 ===
==== Format ====
Based on the standings from the first two rounds of the season, the ten (10) competing teams were ranked and divided into two groups – Legend Group (consisting of the top five teams) and Rise Group (consisting of the bottom five teams), with their first two rounds' records carried over. Each team in their respective groups played a triple round robin where all matches were played in best-of-threes. The top two (2) teams from the legend group directly advanced to the second round of playoffs, while the next two ranked teams (3rd and 4th) qualified for the first round of playoffs. The fifth-ranked team from the legend group and the top three (3) teams from the rise group were placed in the play-ins, and the bottom two (2) teams of said group were eliminated.

==== Rounds 3–5 ====
Legend Group

Pos	Team	Pld	W	L	PCT	Qualification
1	Gen.G	30	29	1	.967	Playoffs Round 2
2	Hanwha Life Esports	30	20	10	.667	Playoffs Round 2
3	T1	30	20	10	.667	Playoffs Round 1
4	KT Rolster	30	14	16	.467	Playoffs Round 1
5	Nongshim RedForce	30	10	20	.333	Play-Ins

Updated to match(es) played on 30 August 2025. Source: LoL Esports

Rise Group

Pos	Team	Pld	W	L	PCT	Qualification
1	Dplus KIA	30	19	11	.633	Play-Ins
2	BNK FearX	30	14	16	.467	Play-Ins
3	OKSavingsBank Brion	30	11	19	.367	Play-Ins
4	DRX	30	9	21	.300	Eliminated
5	DN Freecs	30	4	26	.133	Eliminated

Updated to match(es) played on 29 August 2025. Source: LoL Esports

=== Play-ins ===
==== Format ====
In a double-elimination format, the four (4) teams participated in the play-in stage, where winners of the first two series advanced to the winners bracket, while losing teams were relegated to the losers bracket. The two winners of the first two series faced each other, with the winning team securing the fifth seed in the playoffs. The losing team of the fifth-seed playoff was relegated to the 6th-place playoff, in which the winner of said series clinched the sixth seed.

Opening Matches
3 September
L5	Nongshim RedForce	3
R3	OKSavingsBank Brion	2
4 September
R1	Dplus Kia	2
R2	BNK FearX	3
Elimination Match
6 September
OKSavingsBank Brion	1
Dplus Kia	3

5th Seed Playoff
5 September
Nongshim RedForce	1
BNK FearX	3
6th Seed Playoff
7 September
Nongshim RedForce	0
Dplus Kia	3

Advance to Playoffs
BNK FearX
Dplus Kia

== Playoffs ==
The six (6) remaining teams contested the playoffs in a double-elimination format, where all matches were played in best-of-fives. The top four (4) teams from the playoffs qualified for the 2025 League of Legends World Championship, as an additional slot was unlocked based on the region's performance at MSI 2025. The winner of the LCK Finals was crowned the Season Champion.

Venues

- LoL Park, Seoul (Upper Round 1 to Lower Round 3)
- Inspire Arena, Incheon (Lower Bracket Final and Finals)

Upper round 1	Upper round 2	Upper final	Final
13 September – Seoul
10 September – Seoul	1	Gen.G	2
3	T1	3	4	KT Rolster	3	20 September – Seoul
6	Dplus KIA	2	4	KT Rolster	0
14 September – Seoul	2	Hanwha Life Esports	3
11 September – Seoul	2	Hanwha Life Esports	3
4	KT Rolster	3	3	T1	0
28 September – Incheon
5	BNK FearX	1
2	Hanwha Life Esports	1
1	Gen.G	3
Lower round 1	Lower round 2	Lower round 3	Lower final
27 September – Incheon
21 September – Seoul	4	KT Rolster	0
18 September – Seoul	1	Gen.G	3	1	Gen.G	3
17 September – Seoul	3	T1	3	3	T1	2
6	Dplus Kia	3	6	Dplus Kia	1
5	BNK FearX	1
