= KeSPA Cup =

South Korean esports competition

- 2025 KeSPA Cup logo
- Genre: Esports
- Frequency: Annual
- Location: Asia
- Country: South Korea
- Inaugurated: 2005
- Most recent: 2025
- Website: http://e-sports.or.kr/kespacup/

The KeSPA Cup (Korean: 케스파컵) is an esports event organized by the Korean eSports Association. As of the 2025 edition, the tournament is organized for League of Legends. Until 2016, the tournament was also organized for StarCraft II.

== History ==
The first KeSPA cup was hosted in 2005 as a tournament to allow professional StarCraft teams to play against amateur teams. Events were also held for Special Force, Kartrider, and FreeStyle Street Basketball. The second event was held in 2007 at Sejong University and also included WarCraft III and Counter-Strike.

In 2014, seven years since the last event, KeSPA Cup was brought back for its modern iteration and it has been held every year since. StarCraft II was the only game that had a tournament in the relaunch of the initiative and it featured 16 of the year's best players playing for 8 million South Korean won. The following year, two tournaments for StarCraft II were held, the first in May and the second in July. League of Legends was added as one of the events in 2015.

In 2016, Alex "Neeb" Sunderhaft became the first non-Korean StarCraft player to win a major Korean tournament in sixteen years after winning the 2016 KeSPA Cup. The previous non-Korean champion was Guillaume Patry, who won the first OnGameNet StarLeague in 2000.

== Tournaments ==
=== StarCraft ===
The format for the original StarCraft KeSPA Cup was a team based event where professional teams under KeSPA played against amateur teams. There have been no more tournaments held for StarCraft since 2007.

Year	Name of Tournament	Winners
2005	The First KeSPA Cup	Samsung
2007	The Second KeSPA Cup	MBC Game Hero

=== StarCraft II ===
KeSPA Cup was relaunched with a StarCraft II tournament. All of the tournaments are all part of the StarCraft II World Championship Series and thus award WCS points to the participants. The format for the tournament is a sixteen player elimination tournament starting with group stages and entering a playoffs round in the round of 8.

Year	Name of Tournament	Winner	Score	Runner-up	Prize pool (KRW)
2014	2014 KeSPA Cup	Joo "Zest" Sung-wook	4–1	Kim "herO" Joon-ho	80,000,000
2015	GiGA Internet 2015 KeSPA Cup Season 1	Kim "herO" Joon-ho	4–3	Park "Dark" Ryung-woo	25,000,000
2015	LOTTE Homeshopping 2015 KeSPA Cup Season 2	Eo "soO" Yoon-su	4–1	Park "Dark" Ryung-woo	25,000,000
2016	2016 KeSPA Cup	Alex "Neeb" Sunderhaft	4–0	Cho "Trap" Sung-ho	55,000,000

=== League of Legends ===
League of Legends was added as a recurring event in 2015. Fourteen teams competed in the 2025 edition, including all ten teams of the League of Legends Champions Korea and four invited teams.

Year	Winners	Score	Runners-up	Prize pool (KRW)
2015	ESC Ever	3–0	CJ Entus	100,000,000
2016	ROX Tigers	3–1	Kongdoo Monster	100,000,000
2017	KT Rolster	3–2	Longzhu Gaming	100,000,000
2018	Griffin	3–0	Gen.G	102,000,000
2019	Afreeca Freecs	3–0	Sandbox Gaming	158,000,000
2020	Damwon Gaming	3–0	Nongshim RedForce	144,000,000
2021	DWG KIA Challengers	3–1	Fredit BRION Challengers	30,000,000
2022	Not held			
2023	Not held			
2024	OKSavingsBank Brion	3–1	Dplus KIA	80,000,000
2025	T1	3–2	Hanwha Life Esports	100,000,000
