= 2021 LCK season =

Tenth season of South Korea's League of Legends Champions Korea

- League: LCK
- Sport: League of Legends
- Duration: 13 January – 10 April (Spring)
- Teams: 10

Spring
- Season champions: DWG KIA
- Runners-up: Gen.G
- Season MVP: Kim "Canyon" Geon-bu (DWG KIA)

Summer
- Season champions: DWG KIA
- Runners-up: T1
- Season MVP: Han "Peanut" Wang-ho (Nongshim RedForce)

LCK seasons
- ← 2020 2022 →

The 2021 LCK season was the tenth season of South Korea's LCK, a professional esports league for the MOBA PC game League of Legends.

2021 was also the first season LCK implemented their long-term partnership model. On 1 November 2020, Riot Korea announced the ten organizations that successfully signed the contract for LCK franchising model.

The regular season format was double round robin. During the first round of the split, games were played five days per week, and for the second round, games took place four days a week.

The spring split began on 13 January 2021 and concluded with the spring finals on 10 April 2021.

== Broadcasting ==
The LCK was broadcast at the following platforms:

- (South Korea) Korean: Naver, Afreeca TV, Twitch
- (United States) English: Twitch
- (China) Chinese: HuyaTV
- (France) French: OTP

== Spring ==
=== Regular season ===
Pos	Team	SW	SL	GW	GL	Pts	Qualification
1	DWG KIA	16	2	33	10	23	Advance to Semifinals
2	Gen.G	13	5	29	15	14	Advance to Semifinals
3	Hanwha Life Esports	12	6	26	18	8	Advance to Quarterfinals
4	T1	11	7	27	17	10	Advance to Quarterfinals
5	DRX	9	9	21	26	−5	Advance to Quarterfinals
6	Nongshim RedForce	7	11	18	24	−6	Advance to Quarterfinals
7	KT Rolster	6	12	18	27	−9	
8	Liiv SANDBOX	6	12	15	25	−10	
9	Afreeca Freecs	5	13	16	26	−10	
10	Fredit BRION	5	13	12	27	−15	

=== Playoffs ===
Quarterfinals
Hanwha Life Esports	3
Nongshim RedForce	2
T1	3
DRX	1

Semifinals
DWG KIA	3
Hanwha Life Esports	0
Gen.G	3
T1	0

Finals
DWG KIA	3
Gen.G	0

=== Awards ===
- Most Valuable Player: Canyon, DWG KIA
- Players of the Split: ShowMaker, DWG KIA; Pyosik, DRX; Chovy, Hanwha Life Esports
- Finals MVP: Khan, DWG KIA
- 1st Team All-Pro:
  - T Khan, DWG KIA
  - J Canyon, DWG KIA
  - M ShowMaker, DWG KIA
  - B Ruler, Gen.G
  - S Keria, T1
- 2nd Team All-Pro:
  - T Rascal, Gen.G
  - J Pyosik, DRX
  - M Chovy, Hanwha Life Esports
  - B Teddy, T1
  - S BeryL, DWG KIA
- 3rd Team All-Pro:
  - T Kingen, DRX
  - J Clid, Gen.G
  - M Bdd, Gen.G
  - B Ghost, DWG KIA
  - S Life, Gen.G

== Summer ==
=== Regular season ===
Pos	Team	SW	SL	GW	GL	Pts	Qualification
1	DWG KIA	12	6	29	14	15	Advance to Semifinals
2	Gen.G	12	6	27	19	8	Advance to Semifinals
3	Nongshim RedForce	12	6	27	19	8	Advance to Quarterfinals
4	T1	11	7	25	19	6	Advance to Quarterfinals
5	Liiv SANDBOX	11	7	26	21	5	Advance to Quarterfinals
6	Afreeca Freecs	11	7	25	21	4	Advance to Quarterfinals
7	KT Rolster	7	11	21	25	−4	
8	Hanwha Life Esports	7	11	17	26	−9	
9	Fredit BRION	5	13	20	28	−8	
10	DRX	2	16	9	34	−25	

=== Playoffs ===
Quarterfinals
Nongshim RedForce	3
Afreeca Freecs	1
T1	3
Liiv Sandbox	0

Semifinals
DWG KIA	3
Nongshim Redforce	0
Gen.G	1
T1	3

Finals
DWG KIA	3
T1	1

=== Awards ===
- Most Valuable Player: Peanut, Nongshim RedForce
- Player of the Split: Gori, Nongshim RedForce
- Rookie of the Year: Croco, Liiv SANDBOX
- Best Coach: kkOma, DWG KIA
- 1st Team All-Pro:
  - T Kiin, Afreeca Freecs
  - J Peanut, Nongshim RedForce
  - M ShowMaker, DWG KIA
  - B deokdam, Nongshim RedForce
  - S Keria, T1
- 2nd Team All-Pro:
  - T Khan, DWG KIA
  - J Canyon, DWG KIA
  - M Bdd, Gen.G
  - B Ruler, Gen.G
  - S Kellin, Nongshim RedForce
- 3rd Team All-Pro:
  - T Summit, Liiv SANDBOX
  - J Croco, Liiv SANDBOX
  - M Chovy, Hanwha Life Esports
  - B Prince, Liiv SANDBOX
  - S Effort, Liiv SANDBOX
