= Nongshim RedForce =

South Korean esports organization

- Short name: NS RedForce, NS
- Game: League of Legends; Valorant; PUBG Mobile; Honor of Kings
- Founded: 15 May 2016 (as I Gaming Star)
- League: LCK (LoL); VCT Pacific (Valorant); Pro Series Korea (PUBG Mobile)
- Location: South Korea
- Owner: Nongshim
- CEO: Oh "Evans" Ji-hwan
- Manager: Ko Jin-seob
- General manager: Cha Min-kyu
- Website: www.ns-esports.com

Nongshim RedForce (Note: Formerly known as: I Gaming Star (15 May 2016 – 12 January 2018); ES Sharks (12 January 2018 – 27 May 2019); Team Dynamics (27 May 2019 – 17 December 2020)) (Korean: 농심 레드포스) is a South Korean esports organization owned by food and beverage company Nongshim. The team's name and logo are a reference to Nongshim's popular instant noodle brand Shin Ramyun. The organization initially started as a League of Legends team before branching out into other esports.

== History ==
=== League of Legends ===
For most of its history, the team competed in Challengers Korea (CK), the second division of professional League of Legends in South Korea. However, as Team Dynamics, the team qualified for South Korea's primary league, League of Legends Champions Korea (LCK), after winning the 2020 LCK Summer promotion tournament. In late 2020 Riot Games Korea announced that Team Dynamics would be one of ten permanent franchise partners of the LCK. Nongshim became the main sponsor of Team Dynamics on 17 June 2020, and stated that it would acquire the team after the 2020 LCK season. On 17 December 2020, Team Dynamics was rebranded as Nongshim RedForce.

=== Valorant ===
On 25 November 2024, while owning a Valorant team in Challengers Korea, Nongshim RedForce acquired Sin Prisa Gaming, who had recently promoted to the Valorant Champions Tour via winning the Ascension Pacific tournament. As such, they also acquired their spot in the VCT Pacific League. Their Challengers team was transferred to FearX.

Failing to meet the requirements to keep their spot in the league, they were relegated once again to Ascension, where they retained their spot at the league by beating Boom Esports. They soon made their so-called "Cinderella run" in the Kickoffs, dominating the upper bracket and qualifying their first international tournament by beating RRQ in the Upper Bracket Finals, thus earning them a bye into the playoffs as the 1st seed in their region.

At Masters Santiago, they made an undefeated run into the tournament, only dropping a single map in their matches as they qualified into the Grand Finals, which they won by beating Paper Rex, 3–0, earning the organization's first tournament trophy and becoming the first team from Ascension to do so, as well as becoming the first team to have won an international tournament after starting from the game's Premier tournament game mode (as Sin Prisa Gaming).

== League of Legends ==
=== Current roster ===
Nongshim RedForce League of Legends roster
Players
Coaches

| Role | Handle | Name | Nationality |
|---|---|---|---|
| Top | Kingen | Hwang Seong-hoon | South Korea |
| Jungle | Sponge | Bae Young-jun | South Korea |
| Mid | Scout | Lee Ye-chan | South Korea |
| Bot | Diable | Nam Dae-geun | South Korea |
| Support | Lehends | Son Si-woo | South Korea |

Head coach

Choi "DanDy" In-kyu

Assistant coach(es)

Kim "Crazy" Jae-hee, Park "Chelly" Seung-jin

Legend:
- (I) Inactive
- (S) Suspended
- Substitute
- (injured) Injury / Illness

Roster updated 6 May 2026.

== Valorant ==
=== Current roster ===
Nongshim RedForce Valorant roster
Players
Coaches

| Handle | Name | Nationality |
|---|---|---|
| Xross | Jung Hwan | South Korea |
| Dambi | Lee Hyuk-kyu | South Korea |
| Francis | Kim Mu-bin | South Korea |
| Ivy | Park Sung-hyeon | South Korea |
| Rb | Goo Sang-min | South Korea |
| WoohyuN | Moon Woo-hyun | South Korea |

Head coach

Kim "SilKanon" Gyeong-min

Assistant coach(es)

Ma "ValAnalysis" Hyun-sung
Chae "yoman" Young-moon
So "sungmin" Seong-min

Legend:
- (I) Inactive
- (S) Suspended
- Substitute
- (injured) Injury / Illness

Roster updated 29 July 2026.

== Honor of Kings ==
=== Current roster ===
Nongshim RedForce Honor of Kings roster
Players
Coaches

| Role | Handle | Name | Nationality |
|---|---|---|---|
| Clash | Kyoung9 | Min Kyung-hyun | South Korea |
| Jungle | HAKU | Han Ji-hoon | South Korea |
| Mid | Illusion | Jo Seung-bin | South Korea |
| Farm | SIRI | Lee Hoon-min | South Korea |
| Roam | Fey | You Min-gyu | South Korea |

Head coach

Kim "YK" Hyo-jong

Legend:
- (I) Inactive
- (S) Suspended
- Substitute
- (injured) Injury / Illness

Roster updated 10 August 2025.

== Tournament results ==
| Placement | Event | Final result (W–L) |
|---|---|---|
| 3rd | 2026 Esports World Cup | 2-0 (against BBL Esports) |
| 1st | 2026 VCT Masters Santiago | 3-0 (against Paper Rex) |
| 1st | 2019 CK Summer Split | 11–3 |
| NQ | 2020 LCK Spring Promotion | 1–3 |
| 9th–12th | 2019 KeSPA Cup | 0–2 (against Gen.G) |
| 2nd | 2020 CK Spring Split | 9–5 |
| 1st | 2020 CK Spring Playoffs | 3–1 (against Spear Gaming) |
| Q | 2020 LCK Summer Promotion | 2–0 (against Seorabeol Gaming) |
| 8th | 2020 LCK Summer Split | 5–13 |
| 2nd | 2020 KeSPA Cup | 0–3 (against DAMWON Gaming) |
| 6th | 2021 LCK Spring Split | 7–11 |
| 6th | 2021 LCK Spring Playoffs | 2–3 (against Hanwha Life Esports) |
| 3rd | 2021 LCK Summer Split | 12–6 |
| 4th | 2021 LCK Summer Playoffs | 0–3 (against DWG KIA) |
