= KT Rolster =

South Korean esports organization

- Founded: 1999
- Location: South Korea
- Manager: Kang "H.O.T-Forever" Doh-gyung (SC2); Kang "Hirai" Dong-hoon (LoL)
- Partners: KT; Oronamin C Pocari Sweat; Razer; Danawa
- Website: KT Sports e-Sports

kt Rolster is a South Korean multi-gaming organization founded in 1999 with Korea Telecom as its head sponsor. A member of the Korean e-Sports Association, KT Rolster holds one of the richest and most successful StarCraft teams in the history, as well as one of the most successful League of Legends teams in Korea. The StarCraft team has fielded several legendary players throughout the pro-gaming scenes of StarCraft: Brood War and StarCraft II, such as Flash, Nal rA, YellOw, NaDa, NesTea, Reach, Life, TY and Zest.

== History ==
When the organization was created in 1999, it consisted solely of a StarCraft team which was named KTF n016 Progame Team after its head sponsor, Korea Telecom Freetel. In 2001, the team was renamed KTF MagicNs. When the sponsor merged with Korean Telecom, the organization subsequently went through several name changes and eventually ended up as KT Rolster (short for "Roller Coaster") in August 2009. The team transitioned to Starcraft II during the hybrid 2011-2012 Proleague Season 2.

In October 2012, kt Rolster added two League of Legends teams with members from teams NaJin Shield and the recently disbanded StarTale.

Having reached the quarterfinals of the League of Legends World Championship on three occasions (2015, 2018, 2023), the organization achieved its highest placement in international competition after making the finals of the 2025 League of Legends World Championship.

=== Roster ===
KT Rolster League of Legends roster
Players
Coaches

| Role | Handle | Name | Nationality |
|---|---|---|---|
| Top | PerfecT | Lee Seung-min | South Korea |
| Jungle | Cuzz | Moon Woo-chan | South Korea |
| Mid | Bdd | Gwak Bo-seong | South Korea |
| Bot | FenRir | Park Kang-jun | South Korea |
| Bot | Jiwoo | Jung Ji-woo | South Korea |
| Support | Effort | Lee Sang-ho | South Korea |

Head coach

- Go "Score" Dong-bin

Assistant coach(es)

- Park "Highness" Ji-won
- Kim "Museong" Moo-seong
- Son "Sonstar" Seung-ik

Legend:
- (I) Inactive
- (S) Suspended
- Substitute
- (injured) Injury / Illness

Roster updated 30 July 2026.

== Major tournament results ==
=== StarCraft/StarCraft 2 ===
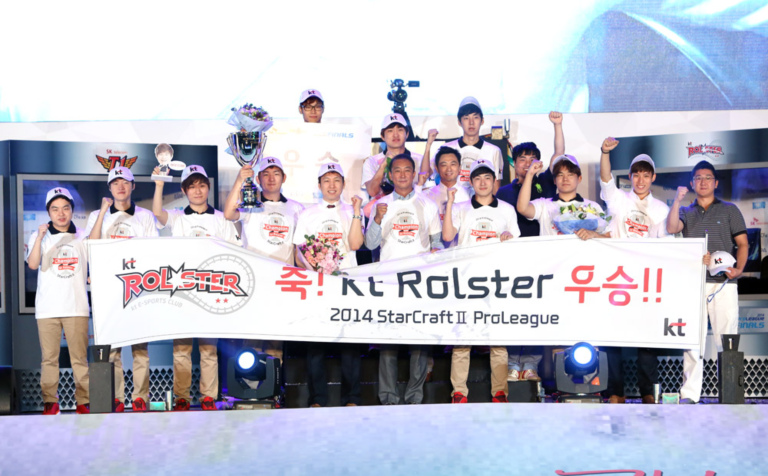
KT Rolster winning the 2014 StarCraft II Proleague

- 2009-2010 Shinhan Bank StarCraft Proleague Champions
- 2010-2011 Shinhan Bank StarCraft Proleague Champions
- 2014 SK Telecom StarCraft II Proleague Champions

=== League of Legends ===
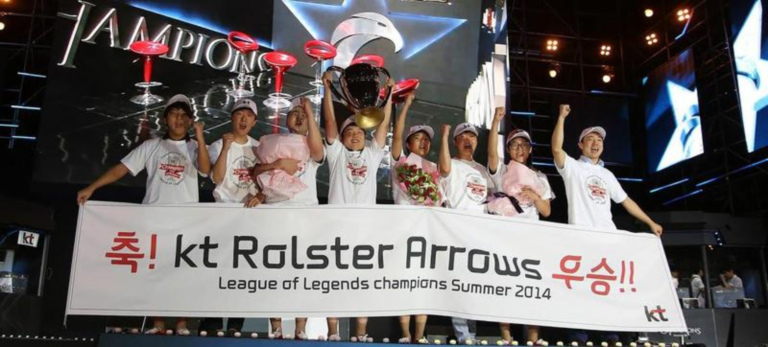
KT Rolster Arrows winning the Summer 2014 season of the League of Legends Champions Korea

==== Arrows ====
- HOT6iX Champions Summer 2014 Champions

==== Bullets ====
- Asian Indoor-Martial Arts Games 2013 Gold Medallists
- Intel Extreme Masters Season VIII World Champions

==== Merged Team ====
- League of Legends World Championship 2015 Quarter-Finals
- KeSPA Cup 2017 Champion
- League of Legends Champions Korea 2018 Summer Split Champion
- League of Legends World Championship 2018 Quarter-Finals
- League of Legends World Championship 2025 Finals

Awards and achievements
| Preceded by Samsung Galaxy Blue | League of Legends Champions Korea winner Summer 2014 | Succeeded by SK Telecom T1 |
| Preceded by CJ Entus Blaze | Intel Extreme Masters World Championship winner Season VIII (2014) | Succeeded by Team SoloMid |
