= Chovy (gamer) =

South Korean esports player (born 2001)

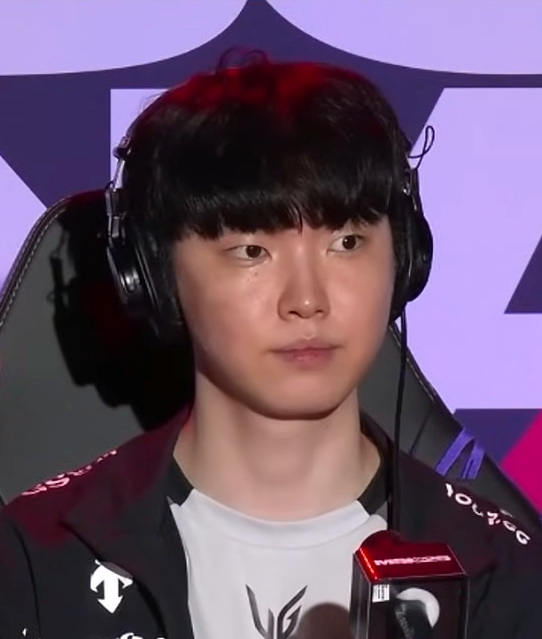
- Chovy at MSI 2025

Personal information
- Name: 정지훈 (Jung Ji-hoon)
- Born: March 3, 2001 (age 25)
- Nationality: South Korean

Current team
- Team: Gen.G
- Role: Mid
- Game: League of Legends
- League: LCK

Career information
- Playing career: 2017–present

Team history
- 2017: KeG Gwangju
- 2018–2019: Griffin
- 2020: DRX
- 2021: Hanwha Life Esports
- 2022–present: Gen.G

Career highlights and awards
- 2× MSI champion (2024, 2025); MSI Finals MVP (2025); Esports World Cup champion (2025); 6× LCK champion; 5× LCK Season MVP; LCK Finals MVP; 5× LCK All-Pro First Team; LCK Cup champion (2026); Rift Rivals champion (2019); KeSPA Cup champion (2018); KeSPA Cup Finals MVP
Medal record
Esports
Representing South Korea
Asian Games
| Gold medal – first place | 2022 Hangzhou | League of Legends |

Jung Ji-hoon (Korean: 정지훈; born March 3, 2001), better known as Chovy, is a South Korean professional League of Legends player for Gen.G. Domestically, he has won six League of Legends Champions Korea (LCK) titles and one KeSPA Cup, appearing in 12 out of 15 LCK finals since his debut. Internationally, he has won two Mid Season Invitational titles in 2024 and 2025, the latter of which he won Finals MVP, and was a finalist of the 2026 World Championship.

His career began in 2017 when he played for KeG Gwangju in the 2017 KeSPA Cup. The next year, he joined Griffin. He reached the 2017 LCK Finals in his rookie season, and at the end of the year, he won the 2018 KeSPA Cup. From 2019 to 2021, Chovy played on a different team each year: Griffin in 2019, DRX in 2020, and Hanwha Life Esports in 2021. In that time, he made three LCK finals appearances and three World Championship appearances. In 2022, Chovy signed with Gen.G. In his first year with the team, he reached the finals in both of the LCK splits, winning the 2022 Summer Split, and reached the semifinals of the 2022 World Championship. He picked up two more LCK titles with Gen.G in 2023, played in his first Mid-Season Invitational (MSI), and played in his fifth consecutive World Championship. He also represented the South Korean national team at the 2022 Asian Games, earning a gold medal. In 2024, Chovy picked up another LCK title and became the first player in LCK history to win four consecutive LCK titles.

Chovy's individual accomplishments include accolades such as four LCK Season MVP awards, an LCK Finals MVP award, four LCK First All-Pro Team designations, and two LCK Player of the Split awards. He also is the fastest player in the LCK to reach 1,000 kills.

== Professional career ==
=== Early career ===
Chovy began his career in December 2017, debuting with KeG Gwangju in the 2017 KeSPA Cup.

=== Griffin ===
Chovy entered the professional League of Legends scene when he was scouted by Kim "cvMax" Dae-ho, the former professional player turned head coach of Griffin. His journey with the team began in March 2018, at the age of 17, initially as a backup to starter Shin "Rather" Hyeong-seop. Griffin participated in the Challengers Series, a developmental league for the League of Legends Champions Korea (LCK), where they finished the spring split with an unbeaten 14–0 record. Following a victory over MVP, they earned a promotion to the LCK for the summer split. In Griffin's inaugural LCK match against Hanwha Life Esports, the team lost the first game. Chovy, initially on the bench, was subbed in for Rather, and Griffin secured victories in the next two games. In the match, Chovy's had 14 kills, two deaths, and 12 assists. From there on, he established himself as a regular starter, while Rather was later loaned to Flash Wolves. Chovy's start to the summer split saw him win nine out of his first 10 games, with a KDA of 14.1, significantly higher than any other player in the league. Additionally, he averaged nearly five kills per game, also higher than any other player. Despite finishing the summer split regular season with a 13–5 record, Griffin faced defeat in the 2018 LCK Summer Split Finals against KT Rolster. At the end of the year, Griffin competed in the 2018 KeSPA Cup, reaching the finals against Gen.G. In the final best-of-three match, Griffin won game one. In the following two games, Chovy played as Irelia and controlled Gen.G's mid laner, Song "Fly" Yong-jun. Chovy's solo leads in the early game helped Griffin succeed, allowing them to win games two and three in 30 minutes, and giving Chovy his first major domestic title. Chovy was named the MVP of the finals.

In a January 2019 interview with ESPN, Chovy stated that he considered retirement after the 2018 season, citing challenges he was grappling with as a player. Despite this, just before the commencement of the 2019 season, he opted to continue his career with Griffin by signing a three-year contract extension. Through the first 10 games of the 2019 LCK Spring Split, Chovy reached a record-setting KDA of 104 — 44 kills, 60 assists, and one death. His KDA peaked at 115, although this occurred in the middle of a game against Sandbox Gaming. On the final day of the regular season, Chovy was tied with Kim "Deft" Hyuk-kyu for the most "Player of the Game" (POTG) awards. Chovy claimed one more POTG award in Griffin's final match against Jin Air Green Wings. This award was met with criticism, as in the game, he did not register a kill. With the most POTG awards, Chovy was named the season MVP. Riot Games Korea acknowledged the controversy and stated intentions to review the MVP selection criteria. In the Spring Split Playoffs, Griffin once again advanced to the finals, this time facing SK Telecom T1 (SKT), but lost by a score of 0–3. Griffin finished the 2019 LCK Summer Split regular season at the top of the standings. In the playoffs, Chovy reached his third consecutive LCK final, where Griffin once again faced SKT. However, Griffin failed to win the title, losing the match by a score of 1–3. Due to their performance throughout 2019, Griffin qualified for the 2019 League of Legends World Championship. Throughout the group stage of Worlds, Chovy had the second-most kills and assists among all mid laners, along with only six deaths. The team advanced past the group stage, to the playoff quarterfinals, where they faced Invictus Gaming on October 26, 2019. In the quarterfinals matchup, Griffin elected to put Chovy in a defensive, tank-like role, matching him up with Invictus' Song "Rookie" Eui-jin. The strategy did not pay off, however, as Griffin lost the match, 1–3, ending their Worlds run.

After Griffin's exit from the 2019 World Championship, the team faced internal turmoil. Just before the championship, head coach cvMax was dismissed. Subsequently, cvMax alleged that Griffin mishandled a contract transfer earlier in the year. Following these accusations, Riot and KeSPA initiated investigations, revealing that Griffin did indeed violate Riot regulations. On November 25, 2019, Still8, the parent company of Griffin, provided all players with the option to terminate their contracts and enter free agency. On that day, Chovy decided to exercise this option and parted ways with the team.

=== DRX ===
In free agency, Chovy was offered multi-million-dollar contracts from teams in China and in the United States. Despite these tempting offers, he chose to sign a one-year deal with DragonX (DRX) for considerably less than his market value. The deciding factor in this decision was the presence of cvMax, who had become the head coach of DRX. DRX also brought in Deft, who was expected to be the core of the team along with Chovy. DRX had a strong showing in the 2020 LCK Spring Split, finishing with a 14–4 record and a seven-game winning streak. In the playoffs, they reached the semifinals but were eliminated by T1, marking the third consecutive split that Chovy faced playoff elimination at the hands of T1. Chovy finished the 2020 LCK Summer Split regular season with the third-most kills in the league. In the playoffs, DRX made it to the finals, marking Chovy's fourth LCK Finals appearance, but they faced a one-sided defeat against DAMWON Gaming (DWG), with DWG winning 3–0. DRX entered the 2020 World Championship as the LCK's second seed. After advancing past the group stage, DRX faced DWG in the playoff quarterfinals. However, mirroring their LCK Summer Split Final, DWG swept DRX 3–0, leading to their exit from Worlds. Following their departure from the World Championship, both Chovy and Deft left DRX due to dissatisfaction with upper management.

=== Hanwha Life Esports ===
For the 2021 season, Chovy and Deft signed with Hanwha Life Esports (HLE). The team secured a third-place finish in the 2021 LCK Spring Split regular season, and Chovy received the "Player of the Split" award, sharing the honor with DWG KIA's Heo "ShowMaker" Su and DRX's Hong "Pyosik" Chang-hyeon. After defeating Nongshim RedForce in the first round of the playoffs, HLE faced DWG KIA in the semifinals. Both Chovy and Deft had underwhelming performances, as DWG went on to win by a score of 3–0. On July 1, 2021, during the Summer Split, Chovy achieved his 1,000th kill and 1,500th assist in HLE's match against DRX. He became the 15th player to reach 1,000 kills and was the fastest player in LCK history to do so. Despite this milestone, HLE did not qualify for the LCK playoffs, marking Chovy's first absence in his career. The team still secured a spot in the 2021 LCK regional qualifier and emerged victorious against Nongshim RedForce in the final, securing the third and final LCK seed for the 2021 World Championship. Hanwha Life progressed through the play-ins and group stage of the World Championship, advancing to the playoff quarterfinals where they faced T1. However, they were eliminated with a 0–3 loss. Chovy's contract with HLE expired on November 15, 2021.

=== Gen.G ===
For the 2022 season, Chovy joined Gen.G, reuniting with support Son "Lehends" Si-woo, his former teammate from Griffin. In the 2022 LCK Spring Split, Gen.G performed well, finishing with a 15–3 record. They reached the 2022 LCK Spring Finals but were defeated by T1 by a score of 1–3. In June 2022, Chovy's contract was extended to the end of the 2023 season. During the 2022 LCK Summer Split, Gen.G continued their strong performance with a remarkable 17–1 record, becoming the third team in LCK history to win 17 or more matches in a single split. Additionally, they achieved an 87.5% game record, the highest percentage in LCK history. Chovy, alongside three teammates, earned a spot on the 2022 Summer LCK All-Pro First Team. In the playoffs, Gen.G defeated Liiv Sandbox in the semifinals and T1 in the finals, securing Chovy his first LCK title. Throughout the playoffs, he maintained a KDA of 15, with 28 kills, 62 assists, and six deaths. At the 2022 World Championship, Gen.G advanced past the group stage and secured a victory against DWG KIA in the knockout quarterfinals. In the semifinals, they faced DRX, a team they had not lost to throughout the year. However, DRX won the match 3 games to 1, bringing an end to Gen.G's run at Worlds.

In the 2023 LCK Spring Split, Gen.G secured a second-place finish in the standings, trailing behind T1. During the playoffs, they defeated Hanwha with a 3–1 victory, earning a spot in the LCK Finals against T1. he best-of-five match took place on April 9, 2023, and Gen.G emerged victorious with a 3–1 score, granting Chovy his second LCK title. Subsequently, Gen.G qualified for the 2023 Mid-Season Invitational (MSI), marking Chovy's inaugural appearance at MSI. Gen.G started the in event's bracket stage, a double-elimination tournament. In their first match, they defeated G2 Esports. Following, they faced T1. T1 won the first two games in the series, needing just one more for victory. In game three, T1's Lee "Gumayusi" Min-hyeong secured a quadra-kill, leaving only Chovy alive. Chased down the mid lane by two T1 players, Chovy noticed T1's Mun "Oner" Hyeon-jun taking tower damage. In less than one second, Chovy bought and activated a Stopwatch, stalling long enough for Oner to fall. Chovy then counter-attacked, defended the nexus, and prevented T1 from ending the game. This decision led Gen.G to victory in that game. While Gen.G won game four, T1 claimed the final game, sending Gen.G to the lower bracket. After taking down Cloud9 in their next match, they lost to Bilibili Gaming, ending their MSI run. In the 2023 Summer Split, Chovy secured his third consecutive LCK title as Gen.G triumphed over T1 in the finals. Chovy was named the MVP of the finals. In the Swiss stage of the 2023 World Championship, Gen.G posted a 3–0 record, advancing them to the knockout stage, where they faced Bilibili in the quarterfinals. However, the team was defeated, 3 games to 2, ending their Worlds run.

Following their Worlds exit, Gen.G released its entire roster, aside from Kim "Peyz" Su-hwan. However, a week later, Chovy re-signed with Gen.G. Gen.G lost only one match in the 2024 LCK Spring Split, finishing the regular season as the top seed for the playoffs with a 17–1 record. Chovy was named the regular season MVP, was named the Player of the Split, and was selected to the 2024 LCK Spring First All-Pro Team. Gen.G defeated T1 in the 2024 LCK Spring Split finals on April 14, securing Chovy his fourth consecutive LCK title and becoming the first player in LCK history to do so.

Chovy started off the 2025 season going seven games without a single death. 49 minutes in to game 3 of their first three-game series against T1, Chovy was left alone against four T1 members after the rest of his team died during their attempted siege on the base. Chovy, playing Viktor, secured a double kill before sniping T1's Gumayusi with a laser from the other side of the wall making it a triple kill. With a wave of minions Chovy single-handedly sieged the base against T1's Faker, taking down the nexus and ending the game just short of 51 minutes. Gen.G went undefeated in the first half of the LCK 2025 regular season with a 18–0 record. At MSI, Gen.G went undefeated in series matches beating T1 3–2 to become back-to-back MSI champions with Chovy being named as the MSI finals MVP. Shortly after, Gen.G became EWC Champions defeating Anyone's Legend in the finals, 3–2. Gen.G finished their LCK season with a record of 29–1 claiming their World's spot as the first seed from the LCK. In the LCK finals, Gen.G defeated Hanwha Life Esports marking Chovy's fifth LCK championship title. During the 2025 season he was named to the LCK all-pro first team, awarded his fourth LCK season MVP and named player of the year at the League Awards.

== National team career ==
Chovy represented South Korea in the 2022 Asian Games one of the six members in the League of Legends division of the South Korea national esports team. Chovy split time with Faker as the team's starting mid laner, but after the group stage, Faker was sidelined due to an illness, leaving Chovy as the team's starter. Chovy clinched a gold medal as South Korea emerged victorious against Saudi Arabia, China, and Chinese Taipei in the quarterfinals, semifinals, and finals, respectively. With the gold medal, Chovy received an exemption from mandatory military service.

== Player profile ==
In the early stages of his career, Chovy was known as a one-trick Cassiopeia player, still in the process of refining his understanding of macro aspects in League of Legends throughout 2018. However, in 2019, he emerged as a pivotal player for his team, gaining acknowledgment for his robust laning and mechanical skills, although he had not yet achieved the all-encompassing proficiency and consistency of some other top mid laners. During this period, Chovy underwent significant growth, expanding his champion pool and honing his mechanical skills. In the mid lane, he transformed each match into a strategic battle over minions, pressuring opponents to either retreat to the Nexus or engage in contests. Following the 2019 World Championship, there was a noticeable shift in Chovy's approach. He placed increased emphasis on coordinating with his team's side lanes early in the game, departing from the traditional wait-for-5-on-5 strategy. Throughout 2020, Chovy continued his evolution, transitioning from a 1v1 outplay specialist who somewhat relied on favorable matchups to a genuine team player.

== Seasons overview ==
| Year | Team | Domestic | | | | | Regional | International | | |
| Year | Team | League | Split | | | | Rift Rivals | First Stand | Mid-Season Invitational | World Championship |
| Year | Team | League | Cup | Spring | Summer | Season Playoffs | Rift Rivals | First Stand | Mid-Season Invitational | World Championship |
|---|---|---|---|---|---|---|---|---|---|---|
| 2018 | Griffin | CK | —N/a | 1st | — | —N/a | Did not qualify | —N/a | Did not qualify | Did not qualify |
| 2018 | Griffin | LCK | —N/a | — | 2nd | —N/a | Did not qualify | —N/a | Did not qualify | Did not qualify |
| 2019 | Griffin | LCK | —N/a | 2nd | 2nd | —N/a | 1st | —N/a | Did not qualify | 5th–8th |
| 2020 | DRX | LCK | —N/a | 3rd | 2nd | —N/a | —N/a | —N/a | None held (Note: Cancelled due to the COVID-19 pandemic.) | 5th–8th |
| 2021 | Hanwha Life Esports | LCK | —N/a | 3rd | 8th | —N/a | —N/a | —N/a | Did not qualify | 5th–8th |
| 2022 | Gen.G | LCK | —N/a | 2nd | 1st | —N/a | —N/a | —N/a | Did not qualify | 3rd–4th |
| 2023 | Gen.G | LCK | —N/a | 1st | 1st | —N/a | —N/a | —N/a | 4th | 5th–8th |
| 2024 | Gen.G | LCK | —N/a | 1st | 2nd | —N/a | —N/a | —N/a | 1st | 3rd–4th |
| 2025 | Gen.G | LCK | 2nd | —N/a | —N/a | 1st | —N/a | Did not qualify | 1st | 3rd–4th |
| 2026 | Gen.G | LCK | 1st | —N/a | —N/a | 1st | —N/a | 3rd–4th | Did not qualify | 2nd |

== Awards and honors ==
=== International ===
- Two-time Mid-Season Invitational champion – 2024, 2025
- One-time Mid-Season Invitational Finals MVP – 2025
- One-time Esports World Cup champion – 2025

=== Regional ===
- One-time Rift Rivals champion – 2019

=== LCK ===
- Six-time LCK champion – Summer 2022, Spring 2023, Summer 2023, Spring 2024, Season 2025, Season 2026
- Five-time LCK Season MVP – Spring 2019, Spring 2024, Summer 2024, Season 2025, Season 2026
- One-time LCK Finals MVP – Summer 2022
- One-time LCK Cup champion – 2026
- Two-time LCK Player of the Split – Spring 2021, Spring 2024
- Five-time LCK All-Pro 1st Team – Summer 2022, Spring 2024, Summer 2024, LCK 2025, 2026 Season
- Five-time LCK All-Pro 2nd Team – Summer 2020, Spring 2021, Spring 2022, Spring 2023, Summer 2023
- One-time LCK All-Pro 3rd Team – Summer 2021

=== Challengers Korea ===
- One-time Challengers Korea champion – 2018

=== South Korean national team ===
- Asian Games gold medal winner – 2022

The Game Awards

=== KeSPA ===
- One-time KeSPA Cup champion – 2018
- One-time KeSPA Cup Finals MVP – 2018
- Best Esports Athlete – 2025

== Philanthropy ==
In March 2020, in response to the COVID-19 pandemic, Chovy donated ₩10 million (US$8,385) to the Community Chest of Korea. In 2022, he donated ₩35 million to support low-income families and areas affected by the 2022 floods in South Korea. In 2023, he made a ₩30 million donation to Save the Children in February, and a ₩20 million donations to the National Disaster Relief Association for the 2023 South Korea floods in July.

== Personal life ==
Chovy was born on March 3, 2001. In an interview, Chovy's mother noted that his desire to become a professional gamer emerged as early as middle school.
