= 2026 LCK season =

- League: LCK
- Sport: League of Legends
- Duration: 14 January – 1 March (LCK Cup); 1 April – 14 June (Rounds 1–2 & Road to MSI); 29 July – 13 September (Rounds 3–4, play-ins, playoffs)
- Teams: 10

LCK Cup
- Champions: Gen.G
- Runners-up: BNK FearX
- Season MVP: Kim "Canyon" Geon-bu (Gen.G)

Road to MSI
- Qualified for MSI 2026: Hanwha Life Esports (1st seed); T1 (2nd seed)

Playoffs
- Season Champions: Gen.G
- Runners-up: Hanwha Life Esports
- Season MVP: Jung "Chovy" Ji-hoon (Gen.G)

LCK seasons
- ← 2025 2027 →

The 2026 LCK season was the 15th season of the League of Legends Champions Korea (LCK), a South Korean professional esports league for the video game League of Legends. It consisted of ten teams participating in three splits, with each split qualifying teams to three international tournaments. The season began on 14 January and ended on 13 September.

Gen.G won both the LCK Cup and the season championship - defeating BNK FearX (3–0) and Hanwha Life Esports (3–1), qualifying for both the First Stand Tournament and the League of Legends World Championship as first seeds from the region, respectively. Both Hanwha Life Esports and T1 also qualified for the World Championship and the Mid-Season Invitational, while BNK FearX also advanced to First Stand, its first appearance at an international League of Legends competition. Dplus KIA also qualified for Worlds at the fourth seed.

== League changes ==
=== Season duration ===
Unlike the previous year, the third split (Rounds 3–5), which originally follows a triple round-robin format, will be shortened to only a double round-robin format, namely Rounds 3–4. This is to give way for the South Korea national esports team for League of Legends preparations for the 2026 Asian Games in Aichi and Nagoya, Japan.

=== Teams ===
Two team changes occurred heading into the 2026 season. On 22 December 2025, DN Freecs was renamed to DN SOOPers following the rebranding of live-streaming service AfreecaTV to SOOP. Days later on 2 January 2026, OKSavingsBank Brion was renamed to Hanjin Brion after a new sponsorship deal was signed between Brion and the Hanjin Group.

An additional team change occurred before the start of the regular season, as DRX would be renamed to KIWOOM DRX on 19 March 2026 following a new sponsorship deal between DRX and Kiwoom Securities.

== Road shows ==
Some games will be held outside of the CHZZK LoL Park in Seoul. On 27 November 2025, the LCK announced that most of Road to MSI will be held at the Wonju Gymnasium in Wonju from 12 to 14 June, while the LCK Finals Weekend will take place at the KSPO Dome from 12 to 13 September. On 27 January 2026, the Kai Tak Sports Park in Kowloon, Hong Kong, was chosen to host the LCK Cup Finals Weekend from 28 February to 1 March, marking the first LCK event to be held outside of South Korea.

Teams will also host events with official games being played. On 28 January 2026, T1 announced two editions of the "T1 Home Ground" event for 2026, with the first being held from 24 to 26 April at the Inspire Arena in Incheon, and the second from 14 to 16 August at the KSPO Dome in Seoul. On 6 February 2026, DRX announced their own roadshow titled "DRX Homefront", to be held at the Vietnam Exposition Center in Hanoi from 8 to 10 May, marking the first LCK event to be held in Vietnam.

== LCK Cup ==
=== Format and draft ===
The LCK Cup featured ten (10) teams divided into two groups of five – Group Baron and Group Elder. A draft to determine the teams in each group was conducted on 7 January 2026, where the finalists from the 2025 LCK season, Gen.G (GEN) and Hanwha Life Esports (HLE), were assigned to Baron and Elder, respectively. As GEN were the defending champions, they had the choice to either have the first or second selection; eventually deciding to pick first. GEN and HLE took turns to make their first selections, with those selections picking the next teams in their respective groups in a snake format until all teams were selected into specific groups. The following were the results of the draft per group:

Group Baron

- 1st pick by Gen.G: T1
- 4th pick by T1: Nongshim RedForce
- 5th pick by Nongshim RedForce: DN SOOPers
- 8th pick by DN SOOPers: Hanjin Brion

Group Elder

- 2nd pick by Hanwha Life Esports: Dplus KIA
- 3rd pick by Dplus KIA: KT Rolster
- 6th pick by KT Rolster: BNK FearX
- 7th pick by BNK FearX: DRX

Each team played cross matches against the other group in a single round-robin format, where all matches were played in best-of-threes except for the third week of the tournament, which was known as a "Super Week" where matches were best-of-fives. Accumulated results of teams in their respective groups were used to determine a Winners group and a Losers group. Unlike the inaugural tournament, the top two teams from the winners group and the highest-ranked team in the losers group directly advanced to the playoffs. The third to fifth-ranked teams from the winners group and the second to fourth-ranked teams from the losers group qualified for the play-in stage, while the bottom-ranked team from the latter group were eliminated.

The play-in stage consisted of six teams in a semi double-elimination bracket consisting of best-of-three and best-of-five matches, with three teams advancing to the playoffs. The highest-ranked team amongst those qualified for the play-in stage received a bye to the second round and had the chance to choose their opponent. Consisting of six teams, the playoffs applied a double-elimination bracket where all matches were best-of-five series, with the top two teams from the winners group receiving a bye to the second round and the highest-ranked team from the losers group also getting a bye for the first round. In addition, the highest-ranked teams from each of the winners and losers group got the chance to select their opponents in their respective rounds. The finalists of the LCK Cup represented the region as its two representatives at the 2026 First Stand Tournament.

=== Group Stage ===
Venue: CHZZK LoL Park, Seoul, South Korea

Group Baron

Total Points: 16

Pos	Team	Pld	W	L	PCT	Qualification
1	Gen.G	5	5	0	1.000	Advance to playoffs
2	T1	5	5	0	1.000	Advance to playoffs
3	Nongshim RedForce	5	2	3	.400	Advance to play-ins
4	DN SOOPers	5	1	4	.200	Advance to play-ins
5	Hanjin Brion	5	0	5	.000	Advance to play-ins

Updated to match(es) played on 23 January 2026. Source: LoL Esports

Group Elder

Total Points: 14

Pos	Team	Pld	W	L	PCT	Qualification
1	BNK FearX	5	3	2	.600	Advance to playoffs
2	Dplus KIA	5	3	2	.600	Advance to play-ins
3	KT Rolster	5	2	3	.400	Advance to play-ins
4	DRX	5	2	3	.400	Advance to play-ins
5	Hanwha Life Esports	5	2	3	.400	Eliminated

Updated to match(es) played on 23 January 2026. Source: LoL Esports

=== Play-ins ===
Round 1
6 February
E4	DRX	2
B5	Hanjin Brion	1
6 February
E3	KT Rolster	0
B4	DN SOOPers	2

Round 2
7 February
E2	Dplus KIA	2
E4	DRX	0
7 February
B3	Nongshim RedForce	1
B4	DN SOOPers	2

Round 3
8 February
E4	DRX	3
B3	Nongshim RedForce	0

Source: LoL Esports

=== Playoffs ===
Venues:

- CHZZK LoL Park, Seoul, South Korea
- Kai Tak Arena, Kowloon, Hong Kong

Round 1	Round 2	Round 3	Final
14 February – Seoul
13 February – Seoul	B1	Gen.G	3
E2	Dplus KIA	3	E2	Dplus KIA	1	21 February – Seoul
E4	DRX	2	B1	Gen.G	3
15 February – Seoul	E1	BNK FearX	1
12 February – Seoul	B2	T1	1
E1	BNK FearX	3	E1	BNK FearX	3
1 March – Kowloon
B4	DN SOOPers	2
B1	Gen.G	3
E1	BNK FearX	0
Lower round 1	Lower round 2	Lower round 3	Lower final
28 February – Kowloon
22 February – Seoul	E1	BNK FearX	3
20 February – Seoul	B2	T1	2	E2	Dplus KIA	0
19 February – Seoul	E2	Dplus KIA	3	E2	Dplus KIA	3
B4	DN SOOPers	3	B4	DN SOOPers	1
E4	DRX	1

Source: LoL Esports

== Regular season ==
=== Rounds 1–2 and Road to MSI ===
==== Format ====
Both the first two rounds and the Road to MSI tournament followed the same format as the previous season. Ten competing teams participated in a double round-robin tournament, where all matches were played in best-of-threes and the top six teams from those rounds qualifying for the Road to MSI best-of-five tournament qualifier for the 2026 Mid-Season Invitational, which was hosted in South Korea.

Road to MSI consisted of the top two teams contesting the region's first seed. The remaining four teams competed in a four-round single-elimination king-of-the hill tournament, with the fifth and sixth-ranked teams beginning in round one; the fourth-ranked team seeded in round two, and the third-ranked team seeded in round three. In round four, the loser of the first-seed playoff faced the winner of round three for a spot at MSI 2026 as the region's second seed.

==== Rounds 1–2 ====
Venues:

- CHZZK LoL Park, Seoul, South Korea
- Inspire Arena, Incheon, South Korea
- Vietnam Exposition Center, Hanoi, Vietnam

Pos	Team	Pld	W	L	PCT	Qualification
1	Hanwha Life Esports	18	15	3	.833	MSI Seed 1 Qualification Match
2	T1	18	14	4	.778	MSI Seed 1 Qualification Match
3	Gen.G	18	14	4	.778	Road to MSI; King-of-the-Hill Tournament
4	KT Rolster	18	13	5	.722	Road to MSI; King-of-the-Hill Tournament
5	Dplus Kia	18	11	7	.611	Road to MSI; King-of-the-Hill Tournament
6	Hanjin Brion	18	6	12	.333	Road to MSI; King-of-the-Hill Tournament
7	BNK FearX	18	6	12	.333	Eliminated; advance to Rounds 3-4
8	KIWOOM DRX	18	5	13	.278	Eliminated; advance to Rounds 3-4
9	Nongshim RedForce	18	5	13	.278	Eliminated; advance to Rounds 3-4
10	DN SOOPers	18	1	17	.056	Eliminated; advance to Rounds 3-4

Updated to match(es) played on 30 May 2026. Source: LoL Esports

==== Road to MSI ====
Venues:

- CHZZK LoL Park, Seoul
- Wonju Gymnasium, Wonju

Round 1
6 June – Seoul
5	Dplus KIA	3
6	Hanjin Brion	0

Round 2
7 June – Seoul
4	KT Rolster	3
5	Dplus KIA	2

Round 3
12 June – Wonju
1	Hanwha Life Esports	3
2	T1	1
13 June – Wonju
3	Gen.G	3
4	KT Rolster	0

Round 4
14 June – Wonju
2	T1	3
3	Gen.G	2

Source: LoL Esports

=== Rounds 3–4 ===
==== Format ====
Based on the standings from the first two rounds of the season, the ten teams were ranked and divided into two groups – Legend Group (consisting of the top five teams) and Rise Group (consisting of the bottom five teams), with their first two rounds' records carried over. Unlike in the previous season, each team in their respective groups played best-of-three matches in a double-round robin format. The top two teams from the legend group advanced to the second round of playoffs, while the next two ranked teams (third and fourth) qualified for the first round of playoffs. The fifth-ranked team from the legend group and the top three teams from the rise group were placed in the play-ins, and the bottom two teams of said group were eliminated.

==== Rounds 3-4 ====
Legend Group

Pos	Team	Pld	W	L	PCT	Qualification
1	Gen.G	26	19	7	.731	Playoffs Round 2
2	Hanwha Life Esports	26	19	7	.731	Playoffs Round 2
3	T1	26	17	9	.654	Playoffs Round 1
4	Dplus KIA	26	17	9	.654	Playoffs Round 1
5	KT Rolster	26	15	11	.577	Play-Ins

Updated to match(es) played on 23 August 2026. Source: LoL Esports

Rise Group

Pos	Team	Pld	W	L	PCT	Qualification
1	Hanjin Brion	26	10	16	.385	Play-Ins
2	Nongshim RedForce	26	10	16	.385	Play-Ins
3	BNK FearX	26	10	16	.385	Play-Ins
4	KIMWOOM DRX	26	7	19	.269	Eliminated
5	DN SOOPers	26	6	20	.231	Eliminated

Updated to match(es) played on 23 August 2026. Source: LoL Esports

=== Play-ins ===
Four teams contested a GSL-style bracket, where the fifth-ranked team in the legend group faced the highest-ranked team from the rise group for the fifth seed in the playoffs. The other two teams went up against each other in an elimination series, with the winner facing the loser of the fifth-seed match to contest the sixth playoff spot.

Round 1
26 August
L5	KT Rolster	3
R1	Hanjin Brion	2
27 August
R2	Nongshim RedForce	1
R3	BNK FearX	3

6th Seed Playoff
28 August
R1	Hanjin Brion	2
R3	BNK FearX	3

Final seeds
KT Rolster	No. 5
BNK FearX	No. 6

Source: LoL Esports

== Playoffs ==
The six remaining teams contested the playoffs in a double-elimination format, where all matches were played in best-of-fives. The top four teams from the playoffs secured qualification for the 2026 League of Legends World Championship, with the winner of the LCK Finals being crowned the Season Champion. By virtue of Hanwha Life Esports winning the 2026 Mid-Season Invitational, a fourth slot was unlocked for the league. HLE subsequently qualified for the World Championship.

The top seed from the regular season, Gen.G, had the chance to select their opponents.

Venues:

- CHZZK LoL Park, Seoul
- KSPO Dome, Seoul (Lower Bracket Final & Final)

Round 1	Round 2	Round 3	Final
1 September
29 August	1	Gen.G	3
3	T1	3	5	KT Rolster	0	5 September
6	BNK FearX	2	1	Gen.G	3
2 September	2	Hanwha Life Esports	1
30 August	2	Hanwha Life Esports	3
4	Dplus KIA	0	3	T1	2
13 September
5	KT Rolster	3
1	Gen.G	3
2	Hanwha Life Esports	1
Lower round 1	Lower round 2	Lower round 3	Lower final
12 September
6 September	2	Hanwha Life Esports	3
4 September	3	T1	3	3	T1	1
3 September	5	KT Rolster	1	4	Dplus KIA	1
6	BNK FearX	2	4	Dplus KIA	3
4	Dplus KIA	3

Source: LoL Esports

== Season Awards ==
- Most Valuable Player: Chovy, Gen.G
- Finals MVP: Ruler, Gen.G
- Rookie of the Year: Smash, Dplus KIA
- Head Coach of the Year: cvMax, Dplus KIA
- All-LCK First Team:
  - T Zeus, Hanwha Life Esports
  - J Kanavi, Hanwha Life Esports
  - M Chovy, Gen.G
  - B Peyz, T1
  - S Keria, T1
- All-LCK Second Team:
  - T Kiin, Gen.G
  - J Lucid, Dplus KIA
  - M Zeka, Hanwha Life Esports
  - B Ruler, Gen.G
  - S Delight, Hanwha Life Esports
- All-LCK Third Team:
  - T Siwoo, Dplus KIA
  - J Canyon, Gen.G
  - M ShowMaker, Dplus KIA
  - B Gumayusi, Hanwha Life Esports
  - S Career, Dplus KIA
