= Smeb =

South Korean pro gamer (born 1995)

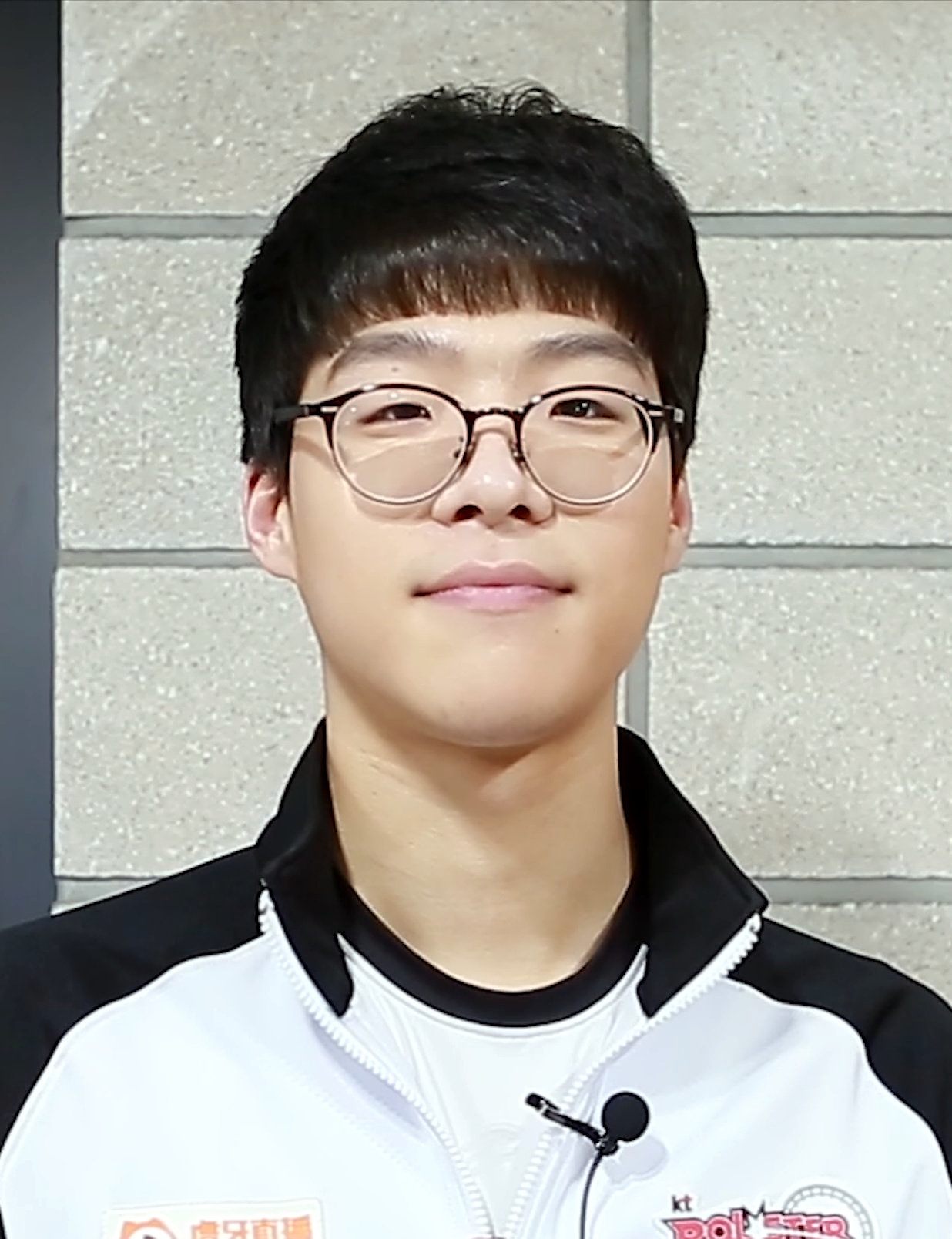
- Song in 2018

Personal information
- Name: 송경호 (Song Kyung-ho)
- Born: June 30, 1995 (age 31)
- Nationality: South Korean

Career information
- Games: League of Legends
- Playing career: 2012–2020
- Role: Top laner

Team history
- 2012: Nab
- 2013–2014: Incredible Miracle 1
- 2015–2016: ROX Tigers
- 2017–2019, 2020: KT Rolster

Career highlights and awards
- 2× LCK champion; 2× LCK season MVP; 2× KeSPA Cup champion

Song Kyung-ho (Korean: 송경호; born June 30, 1995), better known as Smeb, is a South Korean former professional League of Legends player.

== Career ==
Song began competing in League of Legends in 2012. He joined the Tigers in 2014, upon the team's formation. Smeb got his first penta kill recorder of top solo laner; on June 13, 2015, he achieved his penta kill by playing Riven against Jin Air Greenwings. KOO Tigers finished second at the 2015 League of Legends World Championship.

He was named MVP of the 2016 LCK season. Before the beginning of the 2016 League of Legends World Championship, he was ranked the No. 1 player in the world by the Worlds analysts and the No. 2 player in the world by ESPN. Despite his performance, the ROX Tigers lost 3–2 to SKT T1 in the semifinals.

Smeb was the sixth player to achieve 1,000 kills of LCK overall after Faker, Pray, Bang, Score and Kuro. He achieved 1,000 kills in the second round against KONGDOO MONSTER on March 1, 2018, during League of Legends Champions Korea 2018 Spring Season. He was selected as a 2018 PyeongChang Olympic torch relay runner along with the kt Rolster members.

On December 17, 2020, he announced his retirement from professional League of Legends.

== Seasons overview ==
Team	Year	Domestic			Mid-Season Invitational	World Championship
Team	Year	League	Spring	Summer	Mid-Season Invitational	World Championship
Incredible Miracle	2013	Champions	11th–12th	13th–16th	—N/a	Did not qualify
Incredible Miracle	2014	Champions	9th–12th	13th–16th	—N/a	Did not qualify
ROX Tigers	2015	LCK	2nd	3rd	Did not qualify	2nd
ROX Tigers	2016	LCK	2nd	1st	Did not qualify	3rd–4th
KT Rolster	2017	LCK	2nd	3rd	Did not qualify	Did not qualify
KT Rolster	2018	LCK	3rd	1st	Did not qualify	5th–8th
KT Rolster	2019	LCK	9th	8th	Did not qualify	Did not qualify
KT Rolster	2020	LCK	—N/a	6th	—N/a	Did not qualify

== Awards and honors ==
LCK

- Two-time LCK champion — Summer 2016, Summer 2018
- Two-time LCK season MVP — Spring 2016, Summer 2016

KeSPA

- Two-time KeSPA Cup champion — 2016, 2017
- KeSPA League of Legends Popularity Award — 2016
