= Mid-Season Invitational =

Annual League of Legends tournament

- Most recent season or competition: 2026 Mid-Season Invitational
- Game: League of Legends
- Founded: 2015; 11 years ago
- Administrator: Riot Games
- No. of teams: 11
- Venue: Rotating locations (next location: South Korea)
- Most recent champion: Hanwha Life Esports (1st title)
- Most titles: Royal Never Give Up (3 titles)
- Qualification: Regional league winners of the second split (Note: As of 2023, the spring split champions and runner-up from North America (LCS), China (LPL), and Korea (LCK) qualify for the event, while the Winter and Spring champion from EMEA (LEC) qualify for the event, as a result of the introduction of three splits to the LEC season.)
- Streaming partners: Twitch, YouTube
- Related competitions: World Championship; First Stand Tournament
- Tournament format: Double elimination
- Website: lolesports.com

The Mid-Season Invitational (MSI) is an annual League of Legends international tournament hosted by Riot Games in the middle of years, since 2015. It is the second most important international League of Legends tournament aside from the World Championship.

In 2015 and 2016, the event featured the Spring Split champions of the five major competitive League of Legends regional leagues (LEC, LCS, LCK, LMS, LPL), as well as a wildcard team from a region determined by the International Wildcard Invitational, held a few weeks beforehand. In its inaugural tournament, Chinese team Edward Gaming emerged victorious by defeating South Korean team SK Telecom T1 3–2 in the final.

Since 2017, Spring Split champions from all regions have been participating in the event. The International Wildcard Invitational was replaced by the Play-in Stage. The best Wildcard region receives a direct spot in the World Championship's Group Stage for that year for their Summer Split champion. The top four regions gets the pool 1 spot in the World Championship's Group Stage.

Royal Never Give Up from China is the most successful team with three MSI titles.

== History ==
=== 2015 ===
The 2015 Mid-Season Invitational was held from 7–10 May 2015 in Tallahassee, Florida. Five teams qualified to participate at the Mid-Season Invitational after winning the Spring Split within their own regional leagues, while a team from the Wildcard regions qualified by winning the Mid-Season International Wildcard Invitational (IWCI).

All games of the tournament were hosted in the Donald L. Tucker Civic Center. The final was played on 10 May 2015 between Edward Gaming, from China's League of Legends Pro League, and SK Telecom T1, from League of Legends Champions Korea, with Edward Gaming winning the inaugural championship 3–2.

=== 2016 ===
The 2016 Mid-Season Invitational was held from 4–15 May 2016 in Shanghai, China. In line with last years iteration, 5 teams qualified to participate at the Mid-Season Invitational after winning the Spring Split within their own regional leagues, while a team from the Wildcard regions qualified by winning the Mid-Season International Wildcard Invitational (IWCI).

All games of the tournament were hosted in the Shanghai Oriental Sports Center. The final was played on 10 May 2016 between Counter Logic Gaming, from the North American League of Legends Championship Series, and SK Telecom T1, from League of Legends Champions Korea, with SK Telecom T1 winning the championship 3–0. Lee "Faker" Sang-hyeok was awarded the MVP in the final.

=== 2017 ===
The 2017 Mid-Season Invitation was held from 28 April to 21 May 2017, in two Brazilian cities: São Paulo (play in) and Rio de Janeiro (groups and knockout stage). Departing from the previous years, thirteen teams qualified for the event by winning their respective Spring Splits, with the representatives from Europe (EU LCS), South Korea (LCK), and China (LPL) had their teams automatically admitted into the main event, while the other teams were admitted into the "play-in stage", where the top three teams in that stage qualified for the group stage.

The final was played on 21 May 2017, hosted in the Jeunesse Arena, between defending champions SK Telecom T1, from South Korea's League of Legends Champions Korea, and G2 Esports, from the European League of Legends Championship Series, with SK Telecom T1 retaining the championship 3–1, becoming the first team to win back-to-back Mid-Season Invitationals. Lee "Wolf" Jae-wan was awarded the MVP in the finals.

=== 2018 ===
The 2018 Mid-Season Invitational was held between 3–20 May 2018 in Germany and France. The two cities that hosted this event were Berlin (play-in and groups), and Paris (knockout stage). Fourteen teams qualified after winning their respective Spring Splits, with the teams from South Korea (LCK), North America (NA LCS) and China (LPL) automatically seeded into the group stage, whereas the other 10 leagues will compete among each other in a "play-in" with the top 2 teams advancing to join the main event.

The final was played on 20 May 2018, hosted in the Zénith Paris, between King-Zone DragonX, from South Korea's League of Legends Champions Korea, and Royal Never Give Up, from China's League of Legends Pro League, with Royal Never Give Up winning the championship 3–1, with Jian "Uzi" Zihao being awarded the MVP of the finals.

The finals, became one of the most watched esports matches in history, being watched by over 127 million unique viewers (mostly attributed to China's viewership), while the entire event boasted a total viewing time of over 2 billion hours.

=== 2019 ===
The 2019 Mid-Season Invitational was held between 1–19 May 2019 in Vietnam and Taiwan. Three cities that hosted this event were Ho Chi Minh City (play-in), Hanoi (groups), and Taipei (knockout stage). Similar to the 2017 Mid-Season Invitational, thirteen teams qualified for the event, as based on the regional results of the MSI and the World Championship in the two years prior (2017 and 2018), three teams from Europe (LEC), South Korea (LCK), and China (LPL) began in the main group stage; two teams from North America (LCS) and Taiwan/Hong Kong/Macau (LMS) begin in the second round of the play-in stage; and the eight remaining teams begin in the first round of the play-in stage.

The final was played on 19 May 2019, hosted in the Taipei Heping Basketball Gymnasium, between G2 Esports, from Europe's League of Legends European Championship, and Team Liquid, from North America's League of Legends Championship Series, with G2 Esports winning the championship 3–0, becoming the first European team to win the Mid-Season Invitational. Rasmus "Caps" Winther was given the MVP award for his performance in the final.

=== 2020 ===
Due to the COVID-19 pandemic, Riot Games cancelled the event, replacing it with the Mid-Season Streamathon, a series of international competitions and exhibition matches from multiple regions.

=== 2021 ===
The 2021 Mid-Season Invitational was held from 6–23 May 2021 in Reykjavík, Iceland. Twelve teams qualified for the event, where all teams began in the same stage of the tournament, unlike previous years where the winners of the minor leagues had to win play-in matches to face teams from the larger regions. GAM Esports, from the Vietnam Championship Series, was unable to attend the event due to travel restrictions related to the COVID-19 pandemic.

All games of the tournament were hosted in the Laugardalshöll, with no fans in attendance due to the COVID-19 pandemic in Iceland. The final was played on 23 May 2021 between the 2018 Mid-Season Invitational champions Royal Never Give Up, from China's League of Legends Pro League, and the defending World champions DWG KIA (formerly Damwon Gaming), from League of Legends Champions Korea. Royal Never Give Up won the championship 3–2, becoming the second team after T1 (formerly SK Telecom T1) to win two Mid-Season Invitationals. Chen "GALA" Wei was awarded the MVP in the final.

=== 2022 ===
The 2022 Mid-Season Invitational was held from 10–29 May 2022 in Busan, South Korea. Similar to the previous event, eleven teams qualified for the event, where all teams began in the same stage of the tournament, unlike previous years where the winners of the minor leagues had to win play-in matches to face teams from the larger regions. The CIS's League of Legends Continental League was unable to send a representative to the event due to the cancellation of their Spring Split, in response to the Russian invasion of Ukraine.

Due to travel restrictions related to the COVID-19 pandemic in Shanghai, where most of China's LPL teams are based, the LPL representative, Royal Never Give Up had competed in the tournament remotely from the team's training facility or the LPL Arena in Shanghai. All other representatives competed with artificially standardized ping to ensure competitive integrity.

The final was played on 29 May 2022, hosted in the Busan Exhibition and Convention Center (BEXCO). The series was played between the two most successful teams in the competition's history at the time, the defending champions Royal Never Give Up, from China's League of Legends Pro League, and T1, from League of Legends Champions Korea. In the final, Royal Never Give Up won the championship 3–2, becoming the first team to win three MSI titles, and the second team to successfully defend their title (after T1 in 2017). Yan "Wei" Yangwei was awarded the MVP for his performance in the final.

=== 2023 ===
The 2023 Mid-Season Invitational was held from 2–21 May 2023 in London, United Kingdom. Thirteen teams from nine regions qualified for the event as champions of their regional Spring splits, excluding North America (LCS), EMEA (Europe, the Middle East and Africa), Korea (LCK), and China (LPL), who each had two teams participate in the tournament. As a result of this change, the Spring Split champions from Turkey (TCL) and Oceania (LCO) no longer participated in the event due to the Turkish league losing their regional status to become a European Regional League (ERL), and the Oceania league merging under the Southeast Asian Pacific Championship Series (PCS).

The format for the event differed to the previous editions, with the introduction of a play-in stage, consisting of eight teams who are split into two double elimination brackets. There, three teams qualified to the main tournament bracket where the qualifying teams, along with five other teams, faced off in another double elimination bracket to determine the winner of the tournament.

All games of the tournament were hosted in the Copper Box Arena. The finals was played on 21 May 2023 between JD Gaming and Bilibili Gaming, both from the League of Legends Pro League (LPL). In the final, JD Gaming won the series 3–1, with Zhuo "knight" Ding being named the finals MVP of the tournament.

=== 2024 ===
The 2024 Mid-Season Invitational was held from 1–19 May 2024 at the Chengdu Financial City Performing Arts Center in Chengdu, China. Twelve teams from eight regions qualified for the event, with Japan's LJL merging under the Pacific Championship Series (PCS).

The finals was played on 19 May 2024 between Gen.G from the League of Legends Champions Korea (LCK), and the previous years' finalist Bilibili Gaming from the League of Legends Pro League (LPL), a rematch of the upper bracket final between the two teams. In the final, Gen.G won the series 3–1, becoming the second team from the LCK (after T1) to win an MSI title, whilst marking the first time a non-LPL (Chinese) team has won after five consecutive years of prior Chinese winners. Son "Lehends" Si-woo was awarded the finals MVP for his performance in the series. In addition, during game 2 of the finals, player Kim "Peyz" Soo-hwan also broke the record for most kills in a single international game, recording 28 kills. As a result, Gen.G will qualify for the World Championship (provided they also make the Summer playoffs in their regional league), whilst the LCK and LPL earned an additional spot at Worlds.

=== 2025 ===
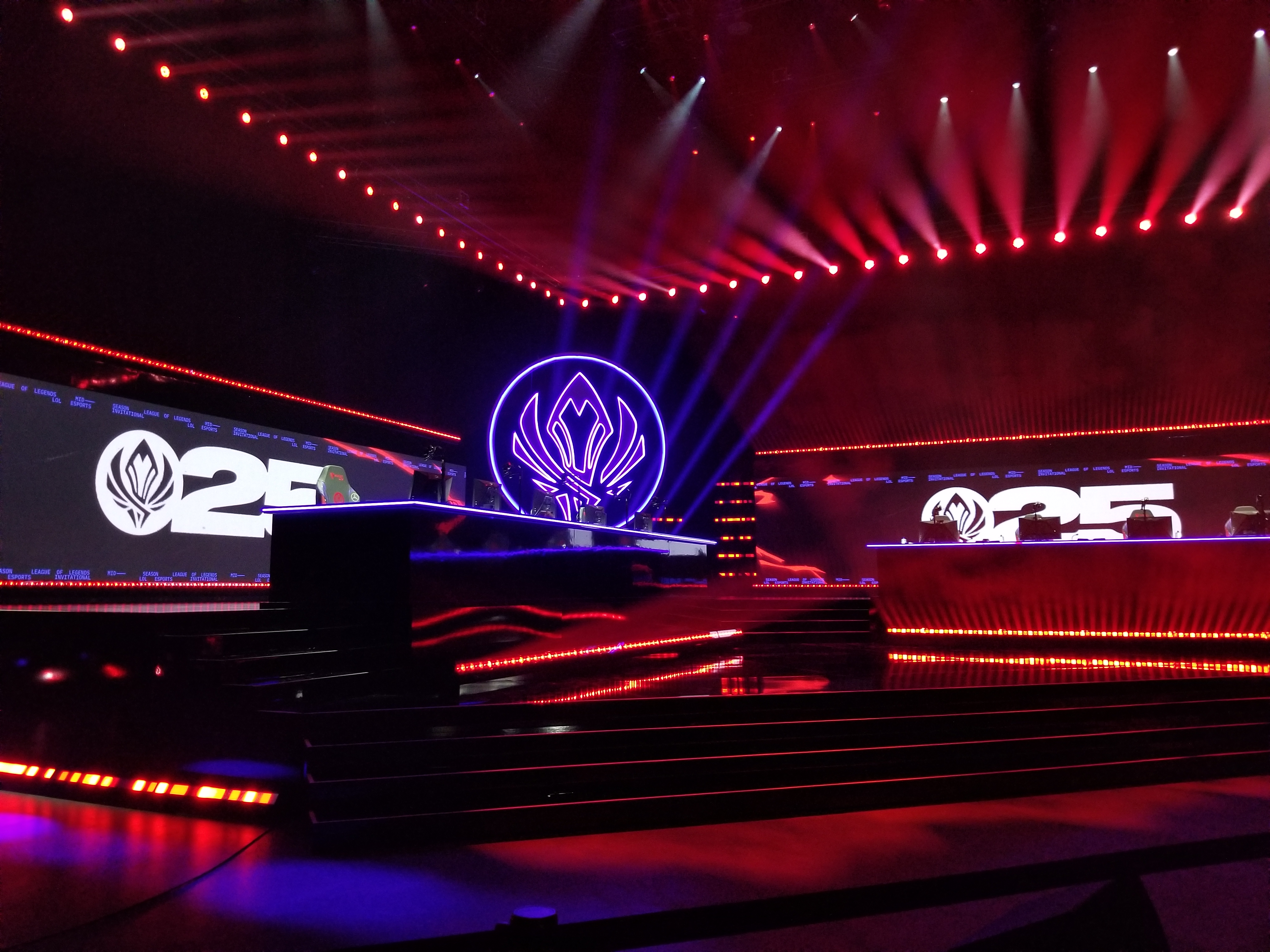
The event stage of MSI 2025 inside Pacific Coliseum

It was announced during the broadcast of the 2024 League of Legends World Championship final that MSI would take place in Canada in 2025, marking the country's first hosting of an international League of Legends competition. Vancouver was announced as the host city on 8 January 2025, with the Pacific Coliseum as the main venue. From this edition onwards, the team representing the winning region at the First Stand Tournament would give its region's two qualified teams a bye to the Bracket Stage. Since Hanwha Life Esports won the inaugural edition, the LCK would get two automatic byes to the Bracket Stage, skipping the Play-in Stage entirely.

All games of the tournament were best-of-fives and were played at the Pacific Coliseum. Out of the 19 best-of-five series played, nine (9) reached a fifth and deciding game, setting the record for the most number of Game 5s in any international League of Legends competition, surpassing the six (6) Game 5s during the 2021 League of Legends World Championship. The tournament was also the first edition of the tournament to feature the Fearless Draft format, where teams cannot pick a champion that they've already played in a series, even if the opposing team already picked that champion.

The final was played on 12 July 2025 between defending champions Gen.G and the two-time reigning world champions T1, both from the League of Legends Champions Korea (LCK), a rematch of the upper bracket final between the two teams. Gen.G won the series, 3–2, becoming the third team to win back-to-back MSI titles after T1 (then-SK Telecom T1) in 2016 and 2017, and Royal Never Give Up in 2021 and 2022. With the victory, Gen.G also qualified for the 2025 League of Legends World Championship provided it reaches the playoffs of the 2025 LCK season, which was certified on 23 July 2025.

=== 2026 ===
On 8 January 2025, Riot Games initially announced that the 2026 edition of MSI would be held in South Korea, marking the first time since 2022 that South Korea will host the event. The location of the event was revealed in November 2025, with Daejeon, South Korea hosting the entirety of the event. The competition will still use a double-elimination format with best-of-five series throughout, but the play-in stage will only qualify one team to the bracket stage.

The final was played on 12 July 2026, hosted in the second building of the Daejeon Convention Center. The series was played between Bilibili Gaming, from China's League of Legends Pro League, and Hanwha Life Esports, from League of Legends Champions Korea. In the final, Hanwha Life Esports won the championship with a 3–2 scoreline to claim their first MSI title, and their win marked the fifth overall time an LCK team has won the event (tied with the LPL in overall tournament wins). Choi "Zeus" Woo-je was awarded the MVP for his performance in the final. Similar to last year, Hanwha Life Esports also qualified for the 2026 League of Legends World Championship, provided the team reaches the playoffs of the 2026 LCK season.

=== 2027 ===
On 8 January 2025, Riot Games announced that the 2027 edition of MSI would be held in Europe. It was later announced in November 2026 that the Feria Valencia in Valencia, Spain, would host the event.

== List of Mid-Season Invitationals ==
Year	Final						No.
Year	Location	Venue	Champion	Score		Runner-up	No.
2015	Tallahassee, U.S.	Donald L. Tucker Civic Center	Edward Gaming	3	2	SK Telecom T1	12
2016	Shanghai, China	Shanghai Oriental Sports Center	SK Telecom T1	3	0	Counter Logic Gaming	12
2017	Rio de Janeiro, Brazil	Jeunesse Arena	SK Telecom T1	3	1	G2 Esports	12
2018	Paris, France	Zénith Paris	Royal Never Give Up	3	1	Kingzone DragonX	12
2019	Taipei, Taiwan	Taipei Heping Basketball Gymnasium	G2 Esports	3	0	Team Liquid	12
~~2020~~	Cancelled due to the COVID-19 pandemic and replaced with the Mid-Season Streamathon						
2021	Reykjavík, Iceland	Laugardalshöll	Royal Never Give Up	3	2	DWG KIA	11 (Note: A team from the Vietnam Championship Series was unable to compete in 2021 due to COVID-19 travel restrictions. In 2022, a team from the CIS's League of Legends Continental League was unable to participate due to the cancellation of their Spring Split, in response to the Russo-Ukrainian war.)
2022	Busan, South Korea	BEXCO	Royal Never Give Up	3	2	T1	11
2023	London, England	Copper Box Arena	JD Gaming	3	1	Bilibili Gaming	13
2024	Chengdu, China	Chengdu Financial City Performing Arts Center	Gen.G	3	1	Bilibili Gaming	12
2025	Vancouver, Canada	Pacific Coliseum	Gen.G	3	2	T1	10
2026	Daejeon, South Korea	Daejeon Convention Center II	Hanwha Life Esports	3	2	Bilibili Gaming	11
2027	Valencia, Spain	Feria Valencia					

=== Titles by region ===
Region	Titles	Runner-up	Total
South Korea (LCK)	5	5	10
China (LPL)	5	3	8
EMEA (LEC)	1	1	2
North America (LCS)	0	2	2

=== Titles by organization ===
Team	League	Champions	Runner-up	Total
Royal Never Give Up	LPL	3	0	3
T1 (Note: Rebranded from SK Telecom T1 in 2019.)	LCK	2	3	5
Gen.G	LCK	2	0	2
G2 Esports	LEC	1	1	2
Edward Gaming	LPL	1	0	1
JD Gaming	LPL	1	0	1
Hanwha Life Esports	LCK	1	0	1
