= 2019 LCK season =

League of Legends Champions Korea
- 2019

Tournament information
- Location: South Korea
- Administrator: Riot Games
- Tournament format(s): 2 Splits (Spring and Summer)
- Teams: 10
- Purse: ₩ 350,000,000

Final positions
- Champion: (South Korea) SK Telecom T1 (Spring and Summer)
- Runner-up: (South Korea) Griffin (Spring and Summer)

The 2019 LCK season was the eighth season of the League of Legends Champions Korea (LCK), a professional esports league for the MOBA PC game League of Legends.

== Spring Split ==
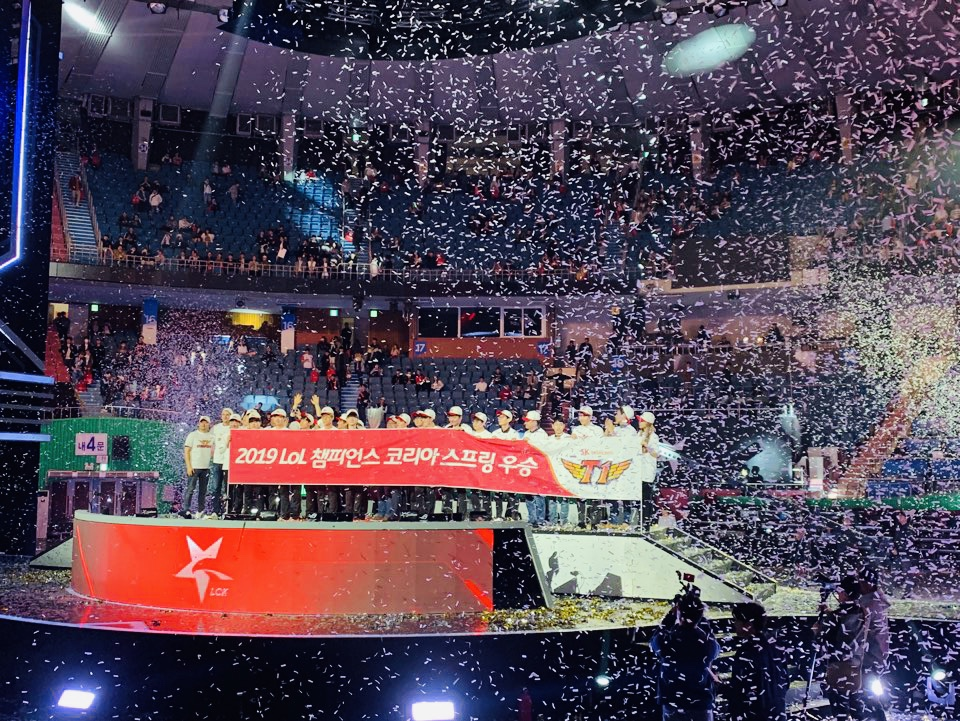
SK Telecom T1 won the Spring Split.

=== Team standings ===
Pos	Team	SW	SL	SPCT	GW	GL	GPCT	Pts	Qualification
1	Griffin	15	3		31	8		23	Advance to Finals
2	SK Telecom T1	14	4		31	13		18	Advance to Playoffs Round 2
3	Kingzone DragonX	13	5		27	12		15	Advance to Playoffs Round 1
4	SANDBOX Gaming	13	5		28	16		12	Advance to Wild Card
5	DAMWON Gaming	11	7		25	17		8	Advance to Wild Card
6	Hanwha Life Esports	9	9		20	21		−1	
7	Gen.G	5	13		16	28		−12	
8	Afreeca Freecs	5	13		14	29		−15	
9	KT Rolster	4	14		13	29		−16	Drop to promotion tournament
10	Jin Air Green Wings	1	17		3	35		−32	Drop to promotion tournament

=== Playoffs ===
Wild Card
4	SANDBOX Gaming	1
5	DAMWON Gaming	2

Playoffs Round 1
3	Kingzone DragonX	3
5	DAMWON Gaming	0

Playoffs Round 2
2	SK Telecom T1	3
3	Kingzone DragonX	0

Finals
1	Griffin	0
2	SK Telecom T1	3

== Summer Split ==
=== Team standings ===
Pos	Team	SW	SL	SPCT	GW	GL	GPCT	Pts	Qualification
1	Griffin	13	5		29	13		16	Advance to Finals
2	DAMWON Gaming	13	5		28	16		12	Advance to Playoffs Round 2
3	SANDBOX Gaming	12	6		27	18		9	Advance to Playoffs Round 1
4	SK Telecom T1	11	7		26	17		9	Advance to Wild Card
5	Afreeca Freecs	11	7		26	20		6	Advance to Wild Card
6	Gen.G	10	8		24	20		4	
7	Kingzone DragonX	9	9		23	23		0	
8	KT Rolster	6	12		16	28		−12	
9	Hanwha Life Esports	5	13		15	27		−12	Drop to promotion tournament
10	Jin Air Green Wings	0	18		4	36		−32	Drop to promotion tournament

=== Playoffs ===
Wild Card
4	SK Telecom T1	2
5	Afreeca Freecs	1

Playoffs Round 1
3	SANDBOX Gaming	0
4	SK Telecom T1	3

Playoffs Round 2
2	DAMWON Gaming	0
4	SK Telecom T1	3

Finals
1	Griffin	1
4	SK Telecom T1	3

== Media ==
=== Streams ===
- (United States) twitch
- (United States) Facebook
- (South Korea) twitch
- (South Korea) AfreecaTV
- (South Korea) NaverTV
- (South Korea) Facebook
- (Taiwan) Garena Live
- (United Kingdom) YouTube
- (Indonesia) YouTube
- (France) twitch
- (Germany) twitch
- (China) Huya
- (Japan) OPENREC
- (Russia) twitch

=== Broadcast Talent ===
- Korean
  - (South Korea) Jeon "Caster Jun" Yong Jun – Play-by-Play Caster
  - (South Korea) Seung "SEONG K" Seung Heon – Play-by-Play Caster
  - (South Korea) Lee "CloudTemplar" Hyun-woo – Color Caster
  - (South Korea) Kim Dong-jun – Color Caster
  - (South Korea) Kang "KangQui" Seung Hyun – Color Caster
- English
  - (Australia) Max "Atlus" Anderson – Play-by-Play Caster
  - (Australia) Chris "PapaSmithy" Smith – Color Caster
  - (United States) Brendan "Valdes" Valdes – Play-by-Play Caster
  - (United States) Nick "LS" De Cesare – Color Caster

=== Viewership Statistics ===
==== Spring ====
Peak Viewership
Total	28,014,116
Without Chinese Viewers	641,088
English Streams	227,915
Chinese Streams	27,532,576
Korean Streams	468,409
Twitch.TV Streams	243,544
YouTube Streams	223,603
Other
Avg Concurrent Viewers	2,878,118
Avg Concurrent Viewers (Excl. Chinese)	124,793
Total time watched	820,503,526

==== Summer ====
Peak Viewership
Total	766 770
Without Chinese Viewers	766 770
Twitch.TV Streams	366 440
Other
Total Time Watched	33 852 258 Hours
Avg Concurrent Viewers	117 136
