= Dplus KIA =

South Korean esports organization

- Short name: DK
- Game: League of Legends; Fortnite Battle Royale; PlayerUnknown's Battlegrounds; Rainbow Six Siege; Valorant
- Founded: 28 May 2017
- League: LCK
- Location: South Korea
- CEO: Lee Yu-yeong
- Championships: 1× World Championship (2020); 3× LCK (Summer 2020, Spring 2021, Summer 2021); 1x Esports World Cup (2026)
- Partners: Kia; Adidas; Logitech; Xenics; Hanatour; Zinus
- Website: dpluskia.gg

Dplus KIA (DK), formerly known as DWG KIA and DAMWON Gaming (abbr. DWG), is a South Korean professional esports organization. Its League of Legends team competes in the LCK, the top-level league for the game in South Korea.

Dplus KIA won their first LCK title on 5 September 2020 after defeating DRX in the 2020 LCK summer finals. Eight weeks later on 31 October 2020, Damwon won the 2020 World Championship after a dominant run through the group and knockout stages and a 3–1 victory over Suning in the grand finals.

== History ==
=== 2017 ===
DAMWON Gaming logo (2017–2020)

DAMWON Gaming was formed on 28 May 2017 by computer manufacturer Damwon after it acquired the Challengers Korea team Mirage Gaming. The team's initial roster consisted of top laner Lee "Parang" Sang-won, jungler Kim "Crush" Jun-seo, mid laner Kim "TRY" Yeong-hoon, bot laner Cho "BeryL" Geon-hee, and support Ryu "Hoit" Ho-seong. Despite a strong start and the addition of mid laner Park "CooN" Jae-ha midway through the summer split, Damwon Gaming finished fifth in the regular season. The roster was subsequently revamped, with Jang "Nuguri" Ha-gwon, Noh "Alive" Jin-wook, and newcomer Heo "ShowMaker" Su replacing Parang, BeryL, and TRY respectively. The new roster did not see much success at the 2017 LoL KeSPA Cup, and so jungler Son "Punch" Min-hyuk and bot laner Kim "Veritas" Kyoung-min were brought in for the 2018 Spring Split.

=== 2018 ===
During the spring regular season, BeryL briefly played for DAMWON Gaming as a substitute bot laner before swapping to support. DAMWON Gaming finished second in the regular season but lost to Ever8 Winners in the first round of playoffs. Crush, Alive, and Veritas left the team shortly afterwards, and bot laner Shin "Nuclear" Jeong-hyeon joined the team to fill in the bot laner position.

DAMWON Gaming dominated the summer regular season, finishing first and losing only a single series to Team BattleComics. DAMWON Gaming later qualified for the LCK after defeating Team BattleComics in the first qualifying match of the 2019 spring promotion tournament.

Rookie jungler Kim "Canyon" Geon-bu was signed to the team prior to the 2018 LoL KeSPA Cup, which he debuted in. DAMWON Gaming was eliminated in the second round of the tournament by Griffin and ended third to fourth. Top laner Lee "Flame" Ho-jong joined DAMWON Gaming as a substitute player after he returned to South Korea from the United States, where he competed for two years. Bot laner Lee "Aries" Chae-hwan also joined from BBQ Olivers, which DAMWON Gaming helped relegate in the aforementioned promotion tournament.

=== 2019 ===
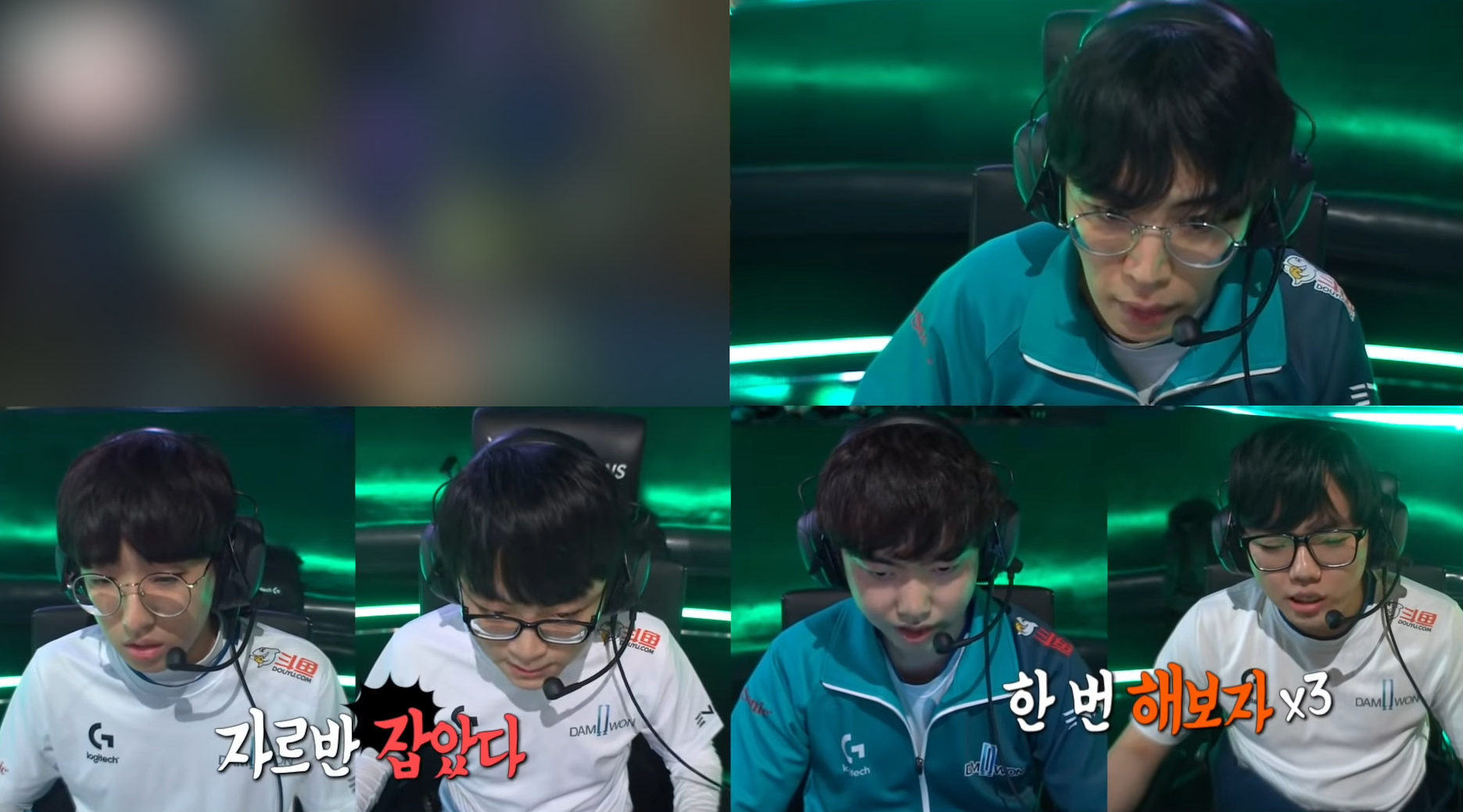
DAMWON players competing in 2019 LCK Spring

DAMWON Gaming finished fifth in the spring regular season and fourth in playoffs after losing the third-place match to Kingzone DragonX. Despite receiving praise for his performance in the regular season, Flame was never subbed in during playoffs, a decision which earned the team considerable criticism from fans.

DAMWON Gaming was one of four LCK teams that participated in Rift Rivals 2019; the LCK won the tournament after defeating China's LPL in the playoff stage. The team retained their entire roster for the summer split and finished second in the regular season and third in playoffs, losing to SKT T1 in the third round. DAMWON Gaming later defeated Kingzone DragonX in the final match of the regional finals to qualify for the play-in stage of the 2019 World Championship. This was the first time where a team qualified for both the LCK and Worlds in the same year.

DAMWON Gaming was drafted into Group D of the play-in stage, along with Turkish team Royal Youth and Brazilian team Flamengo Esports. The team finished top of their group undefeated, and later qualified for the main event after defeating Vietnamese team Lowkey Esports in one of the qualifying matches.

DAMWON Gaming was drafted into Group D of the main event as well, along with China's Invictus Gaming, North America's Team Liquid, and Taiwan's ahq eSports Club. The team once again finished top of their group, but were knocked out of the tournament by Europe's G2 Esports in the quarterfinals.

DRX (formerly Kingzone DragonX), which had introduced several rookies to its roster prior to the 2019 LoL KeSPA Cup, eliminated DAMWON Gaming from the tournament in the quarterfinals.

=== 2020 ===
Despite their performance in the 2019 LoL KeSPA Cup, Damwon's roster was kept in its entirety going into the 2020 spring split. Damwon later added Jang "Ghost" Yong-jun, an AD Carry player, to their roster in February. The team finished fifth in the regular season and fourth in playoffs, falling to DRX once again in a close series. DAMWON Gaming was one of three LCK teams that participated in the 2020 Mid-Season Cup; the team did not make it out of the group stage and finished fifth to sixth.

Without making any roster changes once again, Damwon placed first in the summer regular season with only two series losses, qualifying the team for the summer finals automatically. DAMWON Gaming swept DRX in the finals and won their first LCK title on 5 September.

On 31 October, DAMWON Gaming defeated Suning 3–1 in the 2020 World Championship finals to become world champions. Mid-laner Heo "ShowMaker" Su famously remarked "Shanghai library!" as they claimed the match win, acknowledging the stunned silence that their dominant victory had left the Chinese home crowd in.

DAMWON Gaming announced in late December that it had partnered with Kia Motors and would rebrand as DWG KIA prior to the 2021 LCK season.

=== 2021 ===
DWG KIA logo (2021–2022)

Coming into the 2021 season, Damwon Kia made changes to their roster by promoting one of its academy players, Kim "RangJun" Sang-joon as its midlaner, sharing the position with ShowMaker. They also replaced their star top-laner Nuguri with Kim "Khan" Dong-ha as he departed to FPX. Nonetheless, they won the 2020 KeSPA Cup on 2 January 2021, sweeping Nongshim RedForce in the finals.

Damwon Kia ended the 2021 Spring Split regular season in first place with a record of 16–2. They were locked into the playoff semifinals against HLE, sweeping them and qualifying for their second LCK finals. They were met by Gen.G in the 2021 spring playoff finals on 10 April, ending the series with another sweep against their opponents. This gave Damwon their second LCK title, punching their ticket to the 2021 Mid-Season Invitational.

Damwon Kia finished their group stage with a 5–1 record with one loss against NA's Cloud9 in the 2021 Mid-Season Invitational group stage. They headed into the Rumble Stage, dropping 2 games to China's Royal Never Give Up, ending with a 8–2 record. This gave them the 1st seed heading into the playoffs and they chose Europe's MAD Lions as their semifinals opponent, managing to narrowly beat them 3–2 to lock in a spot at the 2021 Mid-Season Invitational final on 23 May, facing off against China's Royal Never Give Up, the same team they dropped two games against in the Rumble Stage. In the final, the team ended up losing the close series with a score of 3–2 to China's Royal Never Give Up.

Damwon Kia continued their strong form during the 2021 Summer Split, having a 12-6 record in the regular season, before defeating T1 3-0 in the finals to secure a spot in the 2021 League of Legends World Championship. They finished their group stage during the event with a perfect 6–0 run, completely dominating all competition. In the quarterfinals stage, they faced off against the European team MAD Lions, sweeping them 3–0, continuing their perfect run. Their perfect run would be ended in the semifinals by a fellow Korean team, three time world champions T1, who would become the first team to take games off Damwon, though Damwon did win the series 3–2. In the final match, they faced China's Edward Gaming, who defeated them in a very close 3–2 series.

=== 2022–present ===
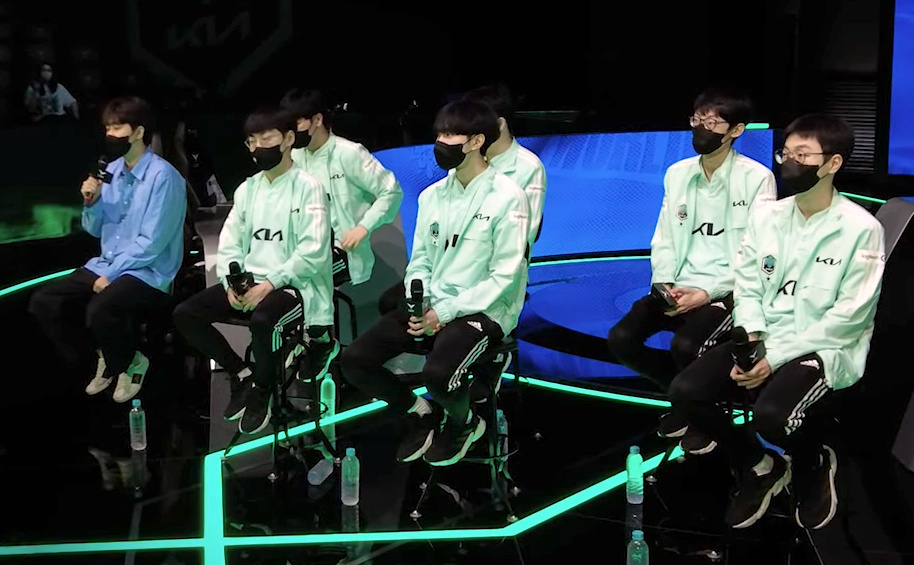
DWG KIA at 2022 Worlds Media Day

The team went through various changes before the start of the regular season, with Ghost and BeryL departing the roster, while Khan announced his retirement from professional play as a result of mandatory military service in South Korea. To replace them, the team signed Seo "deokdam" Dae-gil and Kim "Kellin" Hyeong-gyu from Nongshim RedForce, along with top laners Noh "Burdol" Tae-yoon and Yoon "Hoya" Yong-ho. Damwon finished third in the 2022 Spring regular season with a 11–7 record. During the playoffs, The team swept Fredit Brion in the quarterfinals before losing 2–3 to Gen.G in the semifinals, finishing third to fourth overall.

In April 2022, DWG KIA announced the return of Nuguri, while Hoya departed from the active roster a month later. The team put up a similar performance to Spring, finishing 4th following a loss against T1. Due to their combined results, DWG KIA qualified for the Regional Finals, where they secured the third seed for the 2022 League of Legends World Championship by beating Liiv SANDBOX. They finished second in their group, eliminating Evil Geniuses and G2 Esports, before losing their quarter finals match against fellow Korean team Gen.G.

Notably, the organisation won the League of Legends event at the 2026 Esports World Cup after defeating Karmine Corp with a 3–0 scoreline.

== Rosters ==
=== League of Legends ===
Dplus KIA League of Legends roster
Players
Coaches

Role	Handle	Name	Nationality
Top	Siwoo	Jeon Si-woo	South Korea
Jungle	Lucid	Choi Yong-hyeok	South Korea
Mid	ShowMaker	Heo Su	South Korea
Bot	Smash	Shin Geum-jae	South Korea
Support	Career	Oh Hyeong-seok	South Korea

Head coach

Kim "cvMax" Dae-ho

Assistant coach(es)

Ha "Hachani" Seung-chan
Lee "PoohManDu" Jeong-kyun

Legend:
- (I) Inactive
- (S) Suspended
- Substitute
- (injured) Injury / Illness

Roster updated 21 November 2025.

==== Tournament results ====
Placement	Event	Final result (W–L)
5th	2017 CK Summer Split	7–7
9th–12th	2017 KeSPA Cup	0–2 (against Jin Air Green Wings)
2nd	2018 CK Spring Split	11–3
3rd	2018 CK Spring Playoffs	1–3 (against Ever8 Winners)
1st	2018 CK Summer Split	13–1
Qualified	2019 LCK Spring Promotion	3–1 (against Team BattleComics)
3rd–4th	2018 KeSPA Cup	0–3 (against Griffin)
5th	2019 LCK Spring Split	11–7
4th	2019 LCK Spring Playoffs	0–3 (against Kingzone DragonX)
1st	Rift Rivals 2019 LCK-LPL-LMS-VCS	3–1 (against LPL)
2nd	2019 LCK Summer Split	13–5
3rd	2019 LCK Summer Playoffs	0–3 (against SKT T1)
1st	2019 LCK Regional Finals	12–4
5th–8th	2019 World Championship	1–3 (against G2 Esports)
5th–8th	2019 KeSPA Cup	0–2 (against DRX)
5th	2020 LCK Spring Split	9–9
4th	2020 LCK Spring Playoffs	2–3 (against DRX)
5th–6th	2020 Mid-Season Cup	1–2 (group stage)
1st	2020 LCK Summer Split	16–2
1st	2020 LCK Summer Playoffs	3–0 (against DRX)
1st	2020 World Championship	3–1 (against Suning)
1st	2020 KeSPA Cup ULSAN	3–0 (against Nongshim RedForce)
1st	2021 LCK Spring Split	16–2
1st	2021 LCK Spring Playoffs	3–0 (against Gen.G)
2nd	2021 Mid-Season Invitational	2–3 (against Royal Never Give Up)
1st	2021 LCK Summer Split	12–6
1st	2021 LCK Summer Playoffs	3–1 (against T1)
2nd	2021 World Championship	2–3 (against Edward Gaming)
3rd	2022 LCK Spring Split	11–7
3rd–4th	2022 LCK Spring Playoffs	2–3 (against Gen.G)
4th	2022 LCK Summer Split	10–8
4th	2022 LCK Summer Playoffs	2–3 (against T1)
1st	2019 LCK Regional Finals	3–1 (against Liiv SANDBOX)
5th–8th	2022 World Championship	2–3 (against Gen.G)

=== Rainbow Six Siege ===
DWG KIA Rainbow Six Siege roster
Players
Coaches

Handle	Name	Nationality
CATsang	Heo Se-woong	South Korea
yass	Yoo Sang-hoon	South Korea
coted	Jo Sung-joon	South Korea
RIN	Jang Byeong-uk	South Korea
Woogiman	Park Jin-wook	South Korea

Head coach

Jang "HoundBird" Gwon-jae

Assistant coach(es)

Park "PJH" Jae-hyun

Legend:
- (I) Inactive
- (S) Suspended
- Substitute
- (injured) Injury / Illness

Latest roster transaction: May 31, 2022.

=== Valorant ===
DWG KIA Valorant roster
Players
Coaches

Handle	Name	Nationality
Esperanza	Jeong Jin-cheol	South Korea
exy	Park Geun-cheol	South Korea
allow	Park Sang-wook	South Korea
Lakia	Kim Jong-min	South Korea
Estrella	Park Gun	South Korea
Wenty	Yang Geon-mo	South Korea

Head coach

Kang "solo" Keun-chul

Assistant coach(es)

Jung "peri" Bum-ki

Legend:
- (I) Inactive
- (S) Suspended
- Substitute
- (injured) Injury / Illness

Latest roster transaction: March 15, 2023.

Awards and achievements
Preceded by FunPlus Phoenix	League of Legends World Championship winner 2020; With: Nuguri, Canyon, Showmaker, Ghost, BeryL and Zefa (coach)	Succeeded by Edward Gaming
Preceded by T1	League of Legends Champions Korea winner (2 titles); 2020 Summer – 2021 Summer	Succeeded by T1
