= Griffin (esports) =

South Korean esports organization

- Short name: GRF
- Divisions: PlayerUnknown's Battlegrounds; League of Legends; Overwatch
- Founded: November 2016
- Folded: October 2021
- Team history: NOT BAD (2016–2017); Griffin (2017–2021)
- Location: South Korea
- Owner: Seo "Shark" Kyung-jong
- Parent group: STILL8
- Website: teamgriffin.gg

Griffin (Korean: 그리핀) was a South Korean esports organization owned by esports entertainment company STILL8. It had a team competing in PlayerUnknown's Battlegrounds and previously had teams competing in League of Legends and Overwatch. Griffin's League of Legends team competed in the League of Legends Champions Korea (LCK), the top level of professional League of Legends in South Korea.

== League of Legends ==
=== History ===
Griffin was founded in November 2016 as NOT BAD before renaming in January 2017. After failing to qualify for the League of Legends Champions Korea (LCK) through Challengers Korea (CK) in the year prior, Griffin was finally able to do so on April 14, 2018, defeating veteran organizations Kongdoo Monster and MVP in the LCK 2018 Summer promotion tournament.

Griffin's inaugural LCK roster consisted of top laner Choi "Sword" Sung-won, jungler Lee "Tarzan" Seung-yong, mid laners Jeong "Chovy" Ji-hoon and Shin "Rather" Hyeong-seop, bot laner Park "Viper" Do-hyeon and support Son "Lehends" Si-woo. The team quickly rose to the top of the standings, placing second in the regular season and playoffs after losing 2–3 to KT Rolster in the finals. Despite their performance, Griffin was unable to qualify for the 2018 World Championship through championship points, nor through the 2018 Korea Regional Finals, which they were eliminated from by Gen.G. On December 31, 2018, Griffin won the 2018 KeSPA Cup after sweeping Gen.G 3–0 in the finals.

Excluding Rather, who was loaned to the Flash Wolves in the offseason, Griffin returned to the LCK with the exact same roster for the 2019 LCK Spring Split. The team ended first in the regular season with a 15–3 record, but lost again in the finals after being swept 0–3 by SKT. Griffin was one of four LCK teams that competed at Rift Rivals 2019 LCK-LPL-LMS-VCS, which the league won on July 7, 2019.

Griffin headed into the 2019 LCK Summer Split with a new top laner, Choi "Doran" Hyeon-joon, and finished the regular season in first place with a 13–5 record. This placement secured the team a bye to the finals and a spot in the 2019 World Championship, as a series victory would give them a direct qualification as the LCK's first seed, while a series loss would still earn them the most championship points and qualification as the LCK's second seed. SKT ultimately defeated Griffin once again in the finals, with Griffin only managing to take a single game off SKT.

On January 5, 2021, the team disbanded.
