= Kiwoom Securities =

South Korean financial services company

- Type: Public
- Traded as: KRX: 039490
- Industry: Financial services
- Founded: January 31, 2000; 26 years ago in Seoul, South Korea
- Headquarters: Seoul
- Key people: Hyun-soon Hwang (CEO)
- Revenue: ▲US$2 billion (2022)
- AUM: ▲US$38.1 billion (2022)
- Number of employees: 941 (2022)
- Parent: Daou Technology Inc.
- Website: kiwoom.com

Kiwoom Securities is a South Korean financial services company based in Seoul. Founded in 2000, the company managed US$38.1 billion in assets in 2022 and was ranked on the Forbes Global 2000 list. Kiwoom acts as a broker for both foreign and domestic stock exchanges and futures exchanges. The company additionally provides other financial services, such as investment, risk management, asset management, and investment strategy research.

== History ==
Kiwoom Securities was founded on January 31, 2000, in Seoul. On March 15, 2001, Bong-soo Kim, one of the company's founders and the eventual chairman of the Korea Exchange, was appointed as chief executive officer and president. On April 23, 2004, Kiwoom become a public company and posted its initial public offering on the KOSDAQ market.

In November 2018, Kiwoom signed a five-year, ₩10 billion (US$9.5 million) contract to acquire the naming rights for the KBO League's Seoul-based Heroes baseball team, officially renaming it as the Kiwoom Heroes for the 2019 season.

In May 2023, the Financial Supervisory Service began an investigation of Kiwoom for alleged acts of stock manipulation. News of the investigation caused Kiwoom's stock price to fall.
