= League of Legends Champions Korea =

Professional video game competition

- Current season, competition or edition: 2026 LCK season
- Game: League of Legends
- Founded: 2012; 14 years ago
- First season: 2012
- Organising body: Riot Games
- No. of teams: 10
- Country: South Korea
- Venues: LoL Park, Seoul
- Most recent champion: Gen.G (7th title) (2026)
- Most titles: T1 (10 titles)
- Qualification: Franchise partnership
- International cups: First Stand Tournament; Mid-Season Invitational; World Championship
- Related competitions: CBLOL, LCP, LCS, LEC, LPL

League of Legends Champions Korea (LCK) is the primary competition for League of Legends esports in South Korea. Contested by ten teams, the league runs two seasons per year and serves as a direct route to qualification for the annual League of Legends World Championship. The LCK is administered in cooperation between Riot Games and KeSPA.

The league was formerly named League of Legends Champions before undergoing a major restructuring in late 2014, which saw a change in the competition's format and a rebranding to its current name. OGN reserved exclusive broadcasting rights of the league until 2016 when rights were split with SPOTV Games. In 2019, Riot Games took over the broadcasting of LCK. In 2021 the LCK franchised, and Challengers Korea (CK) and the LCK promotion tournament were discontinued.

Teams from the LCK have won the World Championship a record ten times, including five consecutive titles from 2013 to 2017.

== History ==
=== Pre-LCK era (2012–2014) ===
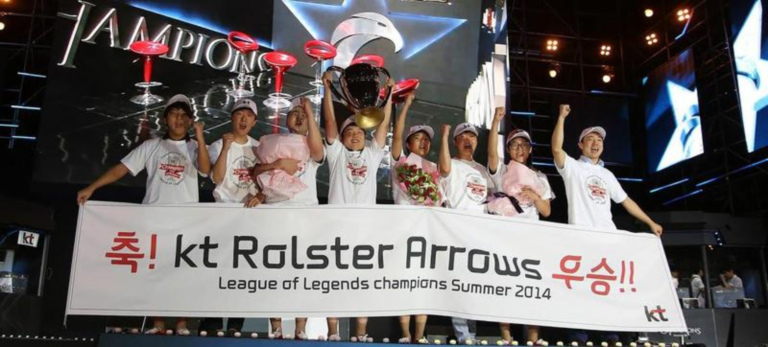
KT Rolster Arrows won the final Korea Champions before the implementation of the LCK.

Following the launch of South Korea's League of Legends server in December 2011, cable broadcaster OnGameNet launched the country's first major League of Legends tournament in March 2012. Named The Champions Spring 2012, the tournament ran from March to May and was contested by a total of 16 teams. MiG Blaze was crowned the competition's inaugural champion after defeating their organizational sibling team MiG Frost in the finals. The Champions Summer 2012 followed later that year, with a rebranded MiG Frost, now known as Azubu Frost, claiming the title themselves. Azubu Frost, along with NaJin Sword, went on to represent South Korea in their first appearance at the League of Legends World Championship in October.

A tri-tournament annual circuit was soon set as the norm for the league's calendar year, now consisting of three seasons held in the winter, spring, and summer. Azubu Frost and NaJin Sword clashed early in 2013 in the finals of Champions Winter 2012–13, with the latter emerging victorious. Champions Spring 2013 and Champions Summer 2013 later followed, being won by MVP Ozone and SK Telecom T1 K respectively. SK Telecom T1 K went on to win the Season 3 World Championship later that year, becoming the first team from the league to do so.

SK Telecom T1 K became the first team to successfully defend their title the following year, sweeping Samsung Galaxy Ozone in the finals of Champions Winter 2013–14 to cap off an undefeated tournament run. Ozone's sibling team, Samsung Galaxy Blue, went on to win Champions Spring 2014 but were bested in the finals of Champions Summer 2014 by KT Rolster Arrows.

In October 2014, plans were announced for a drastic overhaul of the league's structure. League of Legends Champions was rebranded to League of Legends Champions Korea (LCK), and the winter season was abolished in favor of an annual circuit consisting of the Spring Split and Summer Split. The competition's format, which consisted of a 16-team tournament with a group stage progressing into a knockout stage, was changed to a 10-team league operating on a round-robin basis, with the top five teams qualifying for a playoffs bracket. Furthermore, organizations were prohibited from owning more than one team - in particular, this change most heavily affected KeSPA-affiliated teams, all of which operated two squads as part of a sibling team system, forcing numerous organizations to merge or disband rosters.

=== LCK era (since 2015) ===
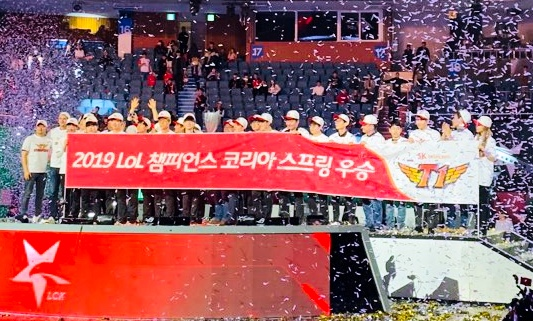
T1 is the most decorated team in the LCK.

LCK Spring 2015 marked the debut of the league operating under its new format and identity. A newly minted SK Telecom T1, a product of the prior year's merger between SK Telecom T1 K and SK Telecom T1 S, swept the calendar year by winning both LCK Spring 2015 and LCK Summer 2015.

SK Telecom T1 retained their crown in LCK Spring 2016, becoming the first team in competition history to win three consecutive titles. Their streak of dominance was ended in LCK Summer 2016 by ROX Tigers (currently Hanwha Life Esports), who became only the second team to win the league since its restructuring.

SK Telecom T1 won their sixth title as an organization on 22 April 2017, by defeating KT Rolster in the finals of LCK Spring 2017. In LCK Summer 2017 Finals, Longzhu Gaming won their first title on 26 August 2017 after defeating the spring winner SK Telecom T1.

Longzhu Gaming rebranded to Kingzone DragonX following the 2017 World Championship, and they defended their title in LCK 2018 Spring by defeating the Afreeca Freecs. kt Rolster won the LCK Summer 2018 championship, defeating Griffin in the finals.

SK Telecom T1 won the LCK Spring 2019 title after defeating Griffin in the finals with 3–0. This marked the seventh LCK title for SK Telecom T1. On 31 August 2019, SK Telecom T1 once again defeated Griffin in the finals with a score of 3–1. This was their eighth championship title, and also their back-to-back LCK title in 2019.

T1 also won the LCK Spring 2020 title after defeating Gen.G in the finals (3–0), taking the title for the third time in a row. The title also marked the organization's ninth championship title, and their first after rebranding from SK Telecom T1 to T1. In LCK Summer 2020, Damwon Gaming won their first championship title after defeating DRX in the finals.

DWG KIA (previously Damwon Gaming) won the title for both LCK Spring and Summer 2021, making them the champions for three consecutive splits. They defeated Gen.G in the Spring, and T1 in the Summer.

On 2 April 2022, T1 won the LCK Spring 2022 title after defeating Gen.G in the finals. This marked their tenth championship title. Gen.G would go on to win the LCK title for four consecutive splits (Summer 2022 to Spring 2024), before Hanwha Life Esports defeated them in the Summer 2024 final. It was Hanwha's first title under their current name and second if counting ROX Tigers' title in the Summer 2016.

On 29 October 2024, the LCK announced a new format to align itself with the rest of global League of Legends in 2025. To accommodate a new international tournament in March known as the First Stand, the league announced the LCK Cup, a "pre-season" tournament that sends the winner to the competition, as well as a merger of the two splits into one single season, with mid-season playoffs being held to determine Korea's MSI representatives and the end of season playoffs determining the LCK champion and Worlds representatives.

== Format ==
Throughout the season, the LCK uses Fearless Draft for all matches. Champions selected by either team in a game cannot be selected again for the remainder of the series. Each year features a preseason tournament, the LCK Cup, and the regular season leading into the season championship. The formats are as follows:

=== LCK Cup ===
==== Group stage ====
The LCK Cup precedes the regular season. The top two teams from the previous season are assigned to two groups (Group Baron and Group Elder), with each group taking turns drafting teams into their group until all teams are divided into two groups of five.

In the group stage, teams play five matches, one against all teams from the opposing group. All matches are best-of-three and award one point to the winning team's group. Since 2026, the final week of the group stage, known as Super Week, features best-of-five matches with two points awarded to the winning team's group.

The results of the group stage are used to determine qualification for the play-ins and playoffs. As of the 2026 season:

- The top two teams from the winning group qualify for the playoffs and start at the upper bracket semifinals.
- The top team from the losing group qualify for the playoffs and start at the upper bracket quarterfinals.
- The third through fifth-placed teams from the winning group and the second through fourth-placed team from the losing group qualify for play-ins.
  - The top two teams among play-in teams start in the second round while the rest start in the first round.
- The fifth-placed team from the losing group is eliminated.

==== Play-ins ====
Six teams compete in a hybrid-elimination play-in bracket, with all matches being best-of-five. The first round is single-elimination between the third to sixth seeds, with the winners advancing to a double-elimination bracket with the top two seeds. The winners of the second round qualify for the first round of the playoffs, while the losers compete in a final match for the final playoff berth.

==== Playoffs ====
Six teams compete in a double-elimination playoff bracket, featuring an extended lower bracket with all matches being best-of-five. The top two teams qualify for the First Stand Tournament as the LCK's representatives.

=== Regular season ===
Since the 2025 season, the LCK hosts a single regular season unlike other leagues that are divided into multiple "splits", each with a different champion. However, the regular season is still split into two, with a mid-season tournament taking place in between.

==== First half ====
In the first half, all ten teams play in a double round-robin tournament, playing two best-of-three matches against all other teams for a total of 18 matches. The top six teams in the first half compete in the Road to MSI tournament.

The Road to MSI features an all-best-of-five stepladder-style bracket. Teams from third to sixth place compete in the stepladder, while the top two teams compete in a single match for the first seed of the Mid-Season Invitational (MSI). The loser of the first seed match and the last remaining team of the stepladder compete in a final match for the second seed.

==== Second half ====
Results from the first half also determine the groupings for the second half. The top five teams are assigned to the Legend Group, while the bottom five are put into the Rise Group. They then play in a triple round-robin, playing three matches against all other teams from their group for a total of 12 additional matches. By the end of the regular season, all teams would have played 30 games. For 2026, due to the Asian Games happening that year, the second half would be a double round-robin, with teams playing eight matches for an overall total of 26.

At the end of the regular season:

- The top two teams from the Legend Group qualify for the playoffs and start in the second round.
- The third and fourth-placed teams from the Legend Group qualify for the playoffs and start in the first round.
- The fifth-placed team from the Legend Group and the top three teams from the Rise Group qualify for the play-ins.

=== Play-ins ===
Four teams compete in a double-elimination GSL-style format, with all matches being best-of-five. The top two teams qualify for the playoffs.

=== Playoffs ===
Six teams compete in a double-elimination playoff bracket, featuring an extended lower bracket with all matches being best-of-five, mirroring the LCK Cup's playoff format. The top three teams qualify for the World Championship, with the fourth-placed team also qualifying should the LCK earn an additional slot via MSI.

== Governance and player protection ==
In 2019, an investigation by Riot Games and the Korean e-Sports Association (KeSPA) found that Griffin, then a rising LCK team, had placed Seo "Kanavi" Jin-hyeok, a minor player, under a potentially exploitative contract. The team's head coach and director were suspended indefinitely, and Griffin was fined for an amount of 100 million KRW.

The controversy led South Korea's Ministry of Culture, Sports and Tourism to introduce standardized contracts for the esports industry, including the Esports Player Standard Contract, the Esports Trainee Standard Contract, and the Teenage Esports Player Standard Affiliated Agreement. The new rules limited player contracts to three years and prohibited teams from trading players or extending their contracts without the player's written consent.

== Teams ==
The following ten organizations compete in the league:

- BNK FearX
- DN SOOPers
- Dplus KIA
- Gen.G
- Hanjin Brion
- Hanwha Life Esports
- Kiwoom DRX
- KT Rolster
- Nongshim RedForce
- T1

== Results ==
=== By season ===
Key
†	The team won the World Championship in the same season

==== 2012–2024 ====
Year	Split	Winners	Runners-up	Third place	Fourth place	Qualified for World Championship			
Year	Split	Winners	Runners-up	Third place	Fourth place	Seed 1	Seed 2	Seed 3	Seed 4
2012	Spring	MiG Blaze	MiG Frost	Xenics Storm	Team OP	Azubu Frost	Najin Sword	—N/a	—N/a
2012	Summer	Azubu Frost	CLG Europe	Najin Sword	Azubu Blaze	Azubu Frost	Najin Sword	—N/a	—N/a
2013	Winter	Najin Sword	Azubu Frost	KT Rolster B	Azubu Blaze	Najin Black Sword	Samsung Galaxy Ozone (Note: Named MVP Ozone before September 2013)	SK Telecom T1 2 †	—N/a
2013	Spring	MVP Ozone	CJ Entus Blaze	SK Telecom T1 2	CJ Entus Frost	Najin Black Sword	Samsung Galaxy Ozone	SK Telecom T1 2 †	—N/a
2013	Summer	SK Telecom T1 2	KT Rolster Bullets	MVP Ozone	CJ Entus Frost	Najin Black Sword	Samsung Galaxy Ozone	SK Telecom T1 2 †	—N/a
2014	Winter	SK Telecom T1 K	Samsung Galaxy Ozone	KT Rolster Bullets	Najin White Shield	Samsung Galaxy Blue	Samsung Galaxy White †	Najin White Shield	—N/a
2014	Spring	Samsung Galaxy Blue	Najin White Shield	Samsung Galaxy Ozone	CJ Entus Blaze	Samsung Galaxy Blue	Samsung Galaxy White †	Najin White Shield	—N/a
2014	Summer	KT Rolster Arrows	Samsung Galaxy Blue	Samsung Galaxy White	SK Telecom T1 S	Samsung Galaxy Blue	Samsung Galaxy White †	Najin White Shield	—N/a
2015	Spring	SK Telecom T1	GE Tigers	CJ Entus	Jin Air Green Wings	SK Telecom T1 †	KOO Tigers	KT Rolster	—N/a
2015	Summer	SK Telecom T1	KT Rolster	KOO Tigers	CJ Entus	SK Telecom T1 †	KOO Tigers	KT Rolster	—N/a
2016	Spring	SK Telecom T1	ROX Tigers	KT Rolster	Jin Air Green Wings	ROX Tigers	SK Telecom T1 †	Samsung Galaxy	—N/a
2016	Summer	ROX Tigers	KT Rolster	SK Telecom T1	Samsung Galaxy	ROX Tigers	SK Telecom T1 †	Samsung Galaxy	—N/a
2017	Spring	SK Telecom T1	KT Rolster	Samsung Galaxy	Team MVP	Longzhu Gaming	SK Telecom T1	Samsung Galaxy †	—N/a
2017	Summer	Longzhu Gaming	SK Telecom T1	KT Rolster	Samsung Galaxy	Longzhu Gaming	SK Telecom T1	Samsung Galaxy †	—N/a
2018	Spring	Kingzone DragonX	Afreeca Freecs	KT Rolster	SK Telecom T1	KT Rolster	Afreeca Freecs	Gen.G	—N/a
2018	Summer	KT Rolster	Griffin	Afreeca Freecs	Kingzone DragonX	KT Rolster	Afreeca Freecs	Gen.G	—N/a
2019	Spring	SK Telecom T1	Griffin	Kingzone DragonX	Damwon Gaming	SK Telecom T1	Griffin	Damwon Gaming	—N/a
2019	Summer	SK Telecom T1	Griffin	Damwon Gaming	Sandbox Gaming	SK Telecom T1	Griffin	Damwon Gaming	—N/a
2020	Spring	T1	Gen.G	DragonX	Damwon Gaming	Damwon Gaming †	DRX	Gen.G	—N/a
2020	Summer	Damwon Gaming	DRX	Gen.G	Afreeca Freecs	Damwon Gaming †	DRX	Gen.G	—N/a
2021	Spring	DWG KIA	Gen.G	Hanwha Life Esports	T1	DWG KIA	Gen.G	T1	Hanwha Life Esports
2021	Summer	DWG KIA	T1	Gen.G	Nongshim RedForce	DWG KIA	Gen.G	T1	Hanwha Life Esports
2022	Spring	T1	Gen.G	DWG KIA	Kwangdong Freecs	Gen.G	T1	DWG KIA	DRX †
2022	Summer	Gen.G	T1	Liiv Sandbox	DWG KIA	Gen.G	T1	DWG KIA	DRX †
2023	Spring	Gen.G	T1	KT Rolster	Hanwha Life Esports	Gen.G	T1 †	KT Rolster	Dplus KIA
2023	Summer	Gen.G	T1	KT Rolster	Hanwha Life Esports	Gen.G	T1 †	KT Rolster	Dplus KIA
2024	Spring	Gen.G	T1	Hanwha Life Esports	Dplus KIA	Hanwha Life Esports	Gen.G	Dplus KIA	T1 †
2024	Summer	Hanwha Life Esports	Gen.G	T1	Dplus KIA	Hanwha Life Esports	Gen.G	Dplus KIA	T1 †

==== 2025–present ====
Ahead of the 2025 season, Riot Games revamped the format for the LCK by combining the Spring and Summer splits into one season, with the first split being known as the LCK Cup, which is a standalone tournament.

Season	Winners	Runners-up	Third place	Fourth place	LCK Cup winners
2025	Gen.G	Hanwha Life Esports	KT Rolster	T1 †	Hanwha Life Esports
2026	Gen.G	Hanwha Life Esports	T1	Dplus KIA	Gen.G

=== By team ===
Teams in italics indicate teams that have been disbanded or no longer participates in the league.

Performances in League of Legends Champions Korea by team
Team	Title(s)	Runners-up	Seasons won	Seasons runner-up
T1 (Note: Previously known as SK Telecom T1)	10	6	2013 Summer, 2013–14 Winter, 2015 Spring, 2015 Summer, 2016 Spring, 2017 Spring, 2019 Spring, 2019 Summer, 2020 Spring, 2022 Spring	2017 Summer, 2021 Summer, 2022 Summer, 2023 Spring, 2023 Summer, 2024 Spring
Gen.G (Note: Previously known as Samsung Galaxy Ozone, Samsung Galaxy Blue & White, Samsung Galaxy, and KSV eSports)	7	6	2014 Spring, 2022 Summer, 2023 Spring, 2023 Summer, 2024 Spring, 2025 Season, 2026 Season	2013–14 Winter, 2014 Summer, 2020 Spring, 2021 Spring, 2022 Spring, 2024 Summer
Dplus KIA (Note: Previously known as Damwon Gaming and DWG KIA)	3	0	2020 Summer, 2021 Spring, 2021 Summer	
KT Rolster (Note: Previously known as KT Rolster Bullets and KT Rolster Arrows)	2	4	2014 Summer, 2018 Summer	2013 Summer, 2015 Summer, 2016 Summer, 2017 Spring
Hanwha Life Esports (Note: Previously known as GE Tigers, KOO Tigers, and ROX Tigers)	2	4	2016 Summer, 2024 Summer	2015 Spring, 2016 Spring, 2025 Season, 2026 Season
CJ Entus (Note: Previously known as MiG Blaze & MiG Frost, Azubu Frost & Azubu Blaze, and CJ Entus Blaze)	2	3	2012 Spring, 2012 Summer	2012 Spring, 2012–13 Winter, 2013 Spring
Kiwoom DRX (Note: Previously known as Incredible Miracle, Longzhu Gaming, Kingzone DragonX, and DragonX)	2	1	2017 Summer, 2018 Spring	2020 Summer
Hanjin Brion (Note: Previously known as Najin Sword, Najin Black Sword & Najin White Shield, Brion Blade, hyFresh Blade, Fredit Brion, and OKSavingsBank Brion)	1	1	2012–13 Winter	2014 Spring
MVP	1	0	2013 Spring	
Griffin	0	3		2018 Summer, 2019 Spring, 2019 Summer
Winterfox (Note: Previously known as Counter Logic Gaming Europe and Evil Geniuses)	0	1		2012 Summer
DN SOOPers (Note: Previously known as Afreeca Freecs, Kwangdong Freecs, and DN Freecs)	0	1		2018 Spring
