= Gen.G =

Esports organization

- Full name: Gen.G Esports
- Short name: GEN / GenG
- Games: Brawl Stars; Counter-Strike 2; Fortnite; Honor of Kings; League of Legends; NBA2K; Overwatch; PlayerUnknown's Battlegrounds; Valorant; Rocket League; Rainbow Six Siege; Apex Legends; EA FC; Mobile Legends: Bang Bang
- Founded: August 2017
- Based in: Los Angeles, California, U.S.; Seoul, South Korea; Shanghai, China
- Owners: Kevin Chou; Kent Wakeford; Michael Li; Phillip Hyun
- Website: geng.gg

Gen.G (Korean: 젠지, stands for "Generation Gaming"), also referred to as Gen.G Esports and previously known as KSV Esports, is a professional esports organization with headquarters in Santa Monica, Seoul, and Shanghai. According to Forbes, Gen.G is the eighth most valuable esports organization in the world as of May 2022, worth US$250 million.

== History ==
Gen.G Esports was formed in 2017 as KSV eSports by Kevin Chou and Kent Wakeford, co-founders of the video game development company Kabam, Michael Li, and Phillip Hyun. The organization started out by acquiring the rights for an Overwatch League franchise in Seoul, South Korea. The purchase reportedly amounted to $20 million with the intention to hire both an all-Korean roster as well as an all-Korean management staff. This team would later be known as the Seoul Dynasty. On May 3, 2018, KSV eSports announced a rebranding to Gen.G. On January 20, 2020, Gen.G was unveiled to be behind an NBA 2K League franchise called the "Gen.G Tigers of Shanghai", the first franchise to not be affiliated with an NBA team, and the first franchise outside of North America. Along with the announcement, Gen.G announced that itself and the NBA 2K League were working together in a "long-term strategic relationship". On August 27, 2020, Gen.G was announced as one of the 10 selected teams as part of League of Legends Champions Korea (LCK) franchising. On September 21, 2022, Gen.G was announced as one of the 10 teams competing in the inaugural season of the VCT Pacifics league.

On May 6, 2024, the Esports World Cup Foundation, funded by the Saudi Arabia Public Investment Fund and organizers of the Esports World Cup tournament series, announced the 30 organizations (known in the ESWC as Clubs) who would make up the Club Support Program, with Gen.G being one of them. This program gives teams a one-time six-figure stipend if an organization is willing to enter new esports as well as additional funding each year if they drive viewership and fan engagement to the Esports World Cup.

== Current divisions ==
=== Brawl Stars ===
On October 8, 2024, Gen. G acquire Brawl Stars player Boni. On December 12, 2024 they sign OPrime as their coach. On January 17, 2025, Gen. G would sign players Mingyu and Siro.

=== Fortnite ===
On October 25, 2018, Gen.G entered Fortnite by signing the female players, KittyPlays, TINARAES, and maddiesuun. In August 2019, Gen.G partnered with Bumble to create an all-female Fortnite team known as "Gen.G Team Bumble", adding hannah and Carlee to their roster. TINARAES would become the first female Fortnite player to win a major competitive Fortnite event at the 'Twitch Rivals: TwitchCon Fortnite Showdown with Rhux and Pika. The team later became inactive, with no further official announcements or competitive appearances after 2021.

On February 19, 2020, Gen.G signed Swedish female Fortnite player Moqii, who would become the first female Fortnite professional player to win a Fortnite Championship Series qualifier.

With the return of Fortnite at the Esports World Cup, Gen.G announced they would be making a return to Fortnite. On January 6, 2026, Gen.G signed the duo Ritual and Ajerss as its primary competitive roster, while signing Jargue and Kingaling for its development roster.. As Kingaling developed into a top player, Gen.G signed his duo Kraez ahead of the last final Esports World Cup qualifier.

=== League of Legends ===
The KSV League of Legends team was formed on November 30, 2017, with the acquisition of Samsung's esports division, which included the 2017 World Champions Samsung Galaxy roster. The team, now named Gen.G Esports, would qualify for the 2018 League of Legends World Championship, but would end up being knocked out promptly in the group stage, with a 1–5 record, in a year with a particularly bad showing from the South Korean teams.

Due to missing out on the 2019 World Championship, the team's next appearance on the world stage would be at the 2020 World Championship. Gen.G would make it to the quarterfinals of the 2020 World Championship before being eliminated by G2 Esports. Gen.G made it to the semifinals of the 2021 World Championship, but they were eliminated by Edward Gaming, which went on to become that year's world champions.

During the 2022 LCK Summer Split, Gen.G won their first LCK championship, defeating T1 in the final 3–0 to qualify as the first seed for the 2022 World Championship. At Worlds, Gen.G grouped up against 100 Thieves, CTBC Flying Oyster, and Royal Never Give Up. After finishing first, they were placed against the 3rd Korean seed DWG KIA in the quarter finals, who they beat in a 3–2 series. In the semi-finals, Gen.G faced DRX, the 4th seeded team from Korea and lost the series 1–3.

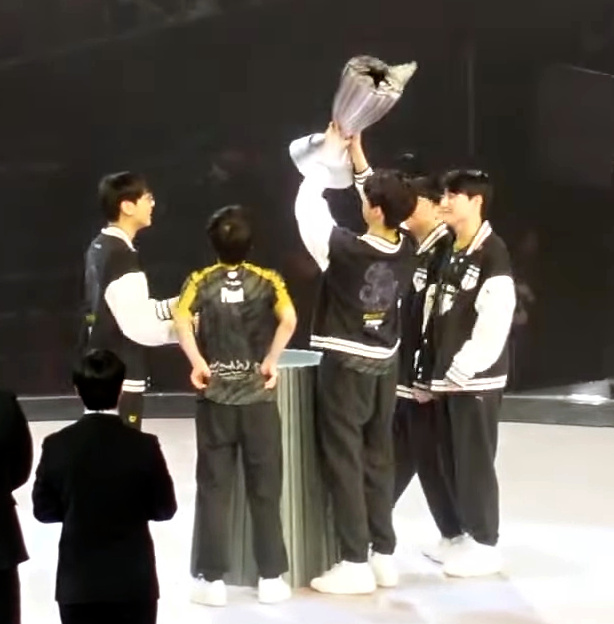
Gen.G won the 2023 LCK Spring Finals.

Once again Gen.G became the champions of LCK Spring 2023, by defeating T1 in the finals by 3–1. With this win, the team qualify as the first seed for the 2023 Mid-Season Invitational along with T1. Gen.G had lost to T1 with score 2–3 and later lost to Bilibili Gaming with score 0–3, finished at 4th place in Bracket Stage. On August 20, 2023, Gen.G defeated T1, became the champions of LCK Summer 2023.

At 2023 World Championship in home ground South Korea, with the new format is called Swiss Stage, they managed to win against GAM Esports, T1 and G2 Esports with result 3-0 series with four game wins and entered straight into the quarter-finals. However, they lost again against opponents Bilibili Gaming with score 2-3, just finished at 5th-8th place in the Worlds 2023.

Before the start of the 2024 season the team went through several changes, with Choi "Doran" Hyeon-joon, Han "Peanut" Wang-ho, and Yoo "Delight" Hwan-joong leaving the roster to join Hanwha Life Esports. To replace them, the organisation signed Kim "Kiin" Gi-in, Kim "Canyon" Geon-bu, and Son "Lehends" Si-woo. The roster found immediate success after the organisation won its fourth consecutive LCK title in the 2024 LCK Spring Split final, defeating T1 3–2 in a close series which allowed them to qualify for the 2024 Mid-Season Invitational. There, the roster made it to the grand final of the event after defeating Bilibili Gaming 3–1 in the upper bracket final. In the Summer split, all 5 members of Gen.G were named to the All-LCK First Team, demonstrating their high level performance throughout the split.

Prior to the 2025 season, Gen.G announced the departure of Kim "Peyz" Su-hwan and Son "Lehends" Si-woo. The empty positions due to the departure of the 2024 botlane were filled by the return of former Gen.G member Park "Ruler" Jae-hyuk from the LPL and the arrival of a newcomer, Joo "Duro" Min-kyu. The team finished the regular season with a 29–1 record in the LCK, and which included a 27 series win streak that spanned from the start of the regular season through MSI and EWC. Their dominant season resulted in all five members of Gen.G once again being named to the All-LCK First Team. During the road to MSI, Gen.G completed a reverse sweep against Hanwha Life Esports to secure themselves the first spot at MSI. They then went on to win the 2025 Mid-Season Invitational and the 2025 Esports World Cup. At the end of the season they claimed their fifth LCK title beating Hanwha Life Esports 3–1. Gen.G earned a ticket to the 2025 League of Legends World Championship as the 1st place seed from the LCK. Gen.G ended their season at the Worlds falling to KT in the semi-finals 1–3. Gen.G was nominated for "Best Esports Team" at The Game Awards 2025, but did not win.

=== NBA 2K ===
On September 26, 2019, the NBA 2K League today announced that Gen.G Esports would launch an NBA 2K League team from Shanghai that will join the other 22 NBA 2K League teams for the 2020 season. Gen.G Tigers of Shanghai was the first NBA 2K League team outside of North America.

=== PUBG: Battlegrounds ===
On November 7, 2017, KSV announced its entrance into the PUBG scene, with the team KSV Asel. Just a few weeks later, on December 7, 2017, KSV added a second team for PUBG, KSV Notitle a.k.a. KSV NTT. On August 16, 2018, Gen.G announced the merging of the two teams. The resulting team has proved very successful over the years, winning the first PUBG World Championship – PUBG Global Invitational 2018, the 2019 Global Championship, and placing third at the 2021 PUBG Global Invitational.

=== Rocket League ===
On September 28, 2022, Gen.G Mobil1 Racing was formed as a result of a partnership between Gen.G Esports and Mobil 1. ApparentlyJack, Chronic and noly joined the starting roster, with Pollo as substitute. Allushin joined as coach on the 30th. This team would compete in the RLCS 2022–2023 season. They would go on to win two regionals during that season along with the Fall Split Major held in Rotterdam. April 10, 2023 Pollo leaves as the sub. October 7, 2023, Noly leaves the roster and on October 10, 2023 Gen.G announces that Firstkiller joins ApparentlyJack and Chronic. April 25, 2024, Chrome joins as coach and Allushin is moved to the inactive roster. October 31, 2024 Chronic, ApparentlyJack, and FirstKiller are released. On November 19, 2024 Gen.G Mobil1 Racing acquire the roster of jstn, Majicbear, and CHEESE. join, with RawGreg as coach and Kevpert as assistant coach. CHEESE. left on October 9, 2025 and was replaced by rise. on the 11th. jstn. was replaced by frosty on March 6, 2026.

=== Valorant ===
On May 4 entered Valorant with the acquisition of FRENCH CANADIANS. Gen.G would win the first major North American VALORANT, T1 x Nerd Street Gamers Invitational. Gen.G would go on to win an additional 3 tournaments in 2020 – Pittsburgh Knights Tournament Series, Pulse Invitational, and Pittsburgh Knights Before Christmas. After being accepted into the Valorant Pacific League, Gen.G moved its Valorant operations to Korea.

During the 2024 season, Gen.G quickly rose to the top, winning the Pacific Kickoff tournament by beating Paper Rex 3–1 in the grand final and qualifying for Masters Madrid. They continued their winstreak in Madrid, becoming the first Korean team to reach an international grand final, but narrowly losing out to Sentinels 2–3. Following this, Gen.G reached their third grand final in VCT Pacific Stage 1, but were beat out by Paper Rex 2–3 in the end. In the subsequent Masters Shanghai, Gen.G went on a flawless run, eventually defeating Team Heretics 3–2 in the grand final and becoming the first Pacific team to hoist an international trophy. Gen.G maintained their dominance in VCT Pacific Stage 2, beating out DRX 3–1 in the grand final and qualifying to Valorant Champions 2024. Their year would come to an end as Sentinels eliminated them in the group stage.

=== Mobile Legends: Bang Bang ===
On January 28, 2026, Gen.G entered Mobile Legends: Bang Bang ahead of the Esports World Cup 2026 for the female division of MLBB. Gen.G acquired the roster of Gaimin Gladiators, the runner-up team for the Mobile Legends: Bang Bang Women's Invitational held in EWC 2026. The organization officially announced their roster for MWI 2026's qualifiers that features the entire Gaimin Gladiators lineup of Aria, Ruii, Sayori, Panda, and Ashlay.

== Rosters ==
Gen.G rosters

Brawl Stars
Handle	Name	Nationality
Boni	Namgung Bo	South Korea
Moding	Im Jin-gyu	South Korea
Cookie	Jang Woo-hyeok	South Korea

League of Legends (LCK)
Handle	Name	Nationality
Kiin	Kim Gi-in	South Korea
Canyon	Kim Geon-bu	South Korea
Chovy	Jung Ji-hun	South Korea
Ruler	Park Jae-hyuk	South Korea
Duro	Joo Min-kyu	South Korea

League of Legends (LCK CL)
Handle	Name	Nationality
Ripple	Byeon Jong-min	South Korea
Courage	Jeon Hyun-min	South Korea
Kemish	Kim Si-hun	South Korea
MUDAI	Lee Seon-gyu	South Korea
SIRIUSS	Go Gun	South Korea
Lumos	Kim Jae-min	South Korea

PUBG
Handle	Name	Nationality
Pio	Cha Seung-hoon	South Korea
Inonix	Na Hee-joo	South Korea
Esther	Go Jeong-wan	South Korea
Asura	Jo Sang-won	South Korea

Rocket League Mobil1 Racing
Handle	Name	Nationality
rise.	Ferguson, Finlay	England
MaJicBear	Acevedo, Christopher	United States
frosty	Walz, Kenneth	United States

Valorant
Handle	Name	Nationality
t3xture	Kim Na-ra	South Korea
Ash	Ha Hyun-cheol	South Korea
Munchkin	Byeon Sang-beom	South Korea
Foxy9	Jung Jae-sung	South Korea
Karon	Kim Won-tae	South Korea
Lakia	Kim Jong-min	South Korea

Fortnite
Handle	Name	Nationality
Ritual	Morton, Maguire	United States
Ajerss	Bernero, Aiden	United States

Legend:
- (I) Inactive
- (S) Suspended
- (L) On loan
- (2W) Two-way player
- Substitute
- (injured) Injury / Illness

== Former division ==
=== Heroes of the Storm ===
On October 24, 2017, it was announced that KSV acquired the rosters of two South Korean Heroes of the Storm (HOTS) teams – MVP Black and MVP Miracle. On November 28, KSV announced it had to drop the now KSV Miracle roster, due to restrictions from Blizzard. KSV Black/Gen.G roster would go on to win 3 Global Championships (2017 HOTS Global Championship, 2018 HOTS Global Championship Mid-Season Brawl, 2018 HOTS Global Championship) before Blizzard ended HOTS esports in December 2018.

=== Clash Royale ===
On February 26, 2018, Gen.G announce the founding of the Clash Royale division in the Clash Royale League China with Cheshen, D.King, XiaoK, Little Chen and Winds. Gen.G Esports withdrew from the Clash Royale League on November 4, 2019.

=== Call of Duty: Black Ops 4 ===
On January 31, 2019, Gen.G Esports enter Call of Duty with the signing of Team Space featuring Spacely, Maux, MajorManiak, Nagafen, Havok, and Nubzy as coach. Gen.G would also bring on Envoy before CWL Fort Worth 2019. Gen.G would finish CWL Anaheim 2019 in 2nd place and finish 2019 CWL Pro League in 2nd place. Gen.G would then be eliminated in last place in the Call of Duty Championship 2019. Shortly after the CWL Championship 2019 Gen.G released all of their players since Gen.G would not be participating in the new Call of Duty League.

=== Apex Legends ===
On March 1, 2019, Gen.G Esports entered the Competitive Apex Legends by signing GrimReality, dummy, and silkthread. On November 19, 2019, Gen.G released its Apex Legends roster due to poor performance.

=== Counter-Strike: Global Offensive ===
On December 6, 2019, Gen.G signed the former core of Cloud9 along with the team's assistant coach. Boston Major winner, Timothy "autimatic" Ta was signed, along with Kenneth "koosta" Suen, Damian "daps" Steele, and Chris "Elmapuddy" Tebbit as head coach. Three days later, Gen.G signed Sam "s0m" Oh after he was released from Team Envy. Hunter "SicK" Mims was also announced as a stand-in for the IEM Katowice 2020 qualifiers until the final slot was filled. On December 22, Gen.G announced the signing Hansel "BnTeT" Ferdinand from top Chinese team TyLoo to finalize the roster. Gen.G won the only in-person LAN in 2020 (due to COVID-19 pandemic), DreamHack Open Anaheim 2020, without dropping a map and currently remaining undefeated on LAN. Gen.G would also win 2020 ESL One: Road to Rio – North America. The roster was subsequently disbanded in February 2021, when its last member, Timothy "autimatic" Ta, was acquired by T1 in VALORANT.

=== Overwatch ===
Gen.G Esports' start came with the acquisition of an Overwatch League franchise spot, naming the team the Seoul Dynasty. In the leadup to this announcement, KSV eSports acquired the roster of Lunatic-Hai, on August 21, 2017.

== Championships ==
List of Gen.G Championships
League of Legends (3)	Heroes of the Storm (3)	PUBG: Battlegrounds (2)	Rocket League (1)
Mid-Season Invitational: Winner in 2024; Winner in 2025	Global Championship: Finals Winner in 2017 (as MVP Black); Mid-Season Brawl Winner in 2018; Finals Winner in 2018	Global Invitational; Winner in 2018; Global Championship; Winner in 2019	Regional Wins; Winner Fall Regional 3 – 2022; Winner Winter Regional 1 – 2023; Winner NA Open 3 – 2025; Fall Split Major; Winner in 2022
