= FearX =

South Korean esports organization

- Short name: FOX
- Games: League of Legends; Crazyracing Kartrider; FIFA Online
- Founded: 18 December 2018
- League: LCK
- Location: South Korea
- CEO: Lee Pil-seong
- Parent group: Sandbox Network
- Website: fearx.gg

FearX (Korean: 피어엑스), formerly Liiv SANDBOX and Sandbox Gaming, (Note: "Sandbox" is stylized in all caps, i.e. "SANDBOX".) is a South Korean esports organization owned by the multi-channel network Sandbox Network. It has teams competing in League of Legends, Crazyracing Kartrider, and FIFA Online.

Its League of Legends team is known as BNK FearX because of its sponsorship with BNK Financial Group and competes in the LCK, the top-level league for the game in South Korea.

== League of Legends ==
=== History ===
Sandbox Network acquired the roster and LCK spot of Team BattleComics on 18 December 2018, shortly after the latter qualified for the league through the promotion tournament.

=== Current roster ===
BNK FEARX League of Legends roster
Players
Coaches

Role	Handle	Name	Nationality
Top	Clear	Sony Hyeong-min	South Korea
Jungle	Raptor	Jeon Eo-jin	South Korea
Mid	VicLa	Lee Dae-Kwang	South Korea
Bot	Taeyoon	Kim Tae-yoon	South Korea
Support	Kellin	Kim Hyeong-gyu	South Korea

Head coach

Park "Edo" Jun-seok

Assistant coach(es)

Nam "Lira" Tae-yoo
Shin "Rather" Hyeong-seop

Legend:
- (I) Inactive
- (S) Suspended
- Substitute
- (injured) Injury / Illness

Roster updated 6 May 2026.
