= Hanwha Life Esports =

South Korean esports organization

- Divisions: League of Legends; Kart Rider
- Founded: 14 November 2016 (as Huya Tigers); 16 April 2018 (as Hanwha Life Esports)
- League: League of Legends Champions Korea; Kart Rider League
- Team history: Tigers (2014–2018) (Note: Due to being sponsored, Tigers was known as: HUYA Tigers (2014–2015); GE Tigers (2015); KOO Tigers (2015–2016); ROX Tigers (2016–2018)); Hanwha Life Esports (since 2018)
- Based in: Seoul
- Arena: Seoul LCK Arena
- Head coach: Yoon "Homme" Sung-young
- Championships: 1x MSI (2026); 1x First Stand (2025); 2× LCK (Summer 2016, Summer 2024); 1× LCK Cup (2025)
- Parent group: Hanwha Life Insurance

Hanwha Life Esports (HLE, Korean: 한화생명 e스포츠) is a South Korean esports organization based in Seoul, owned by Hanwha Life Insurance. It has teams competing in League of Legends and Kart Rider, with the former competing in the LCK, South Korea's top level professional league for the game.

In middle 2018, HLE acquired the League of Legends team and LCK spot of the org-less team Tigers. At the 2015 League of Legends World Championship, Tigers finished as runner-ups after facing SK Telecom T1 in the finals. In 2016, Tigers won their first LCK title after winning the 2016 Summer League of Legends Champions Korea playoffs, and at the 2016 League of Legends World Championship, the team finished as third place after they lost again to SK Telecom T1 2–3, although led the series 2–1.

== History ==
=== Tigers era ===
==== 2014 ====
Tigers was founded in November 2014 by Chinese social networking site YY. YY's parent company Guongzhou Huaduo Network Technology, LLC. (Duowan Inc.) hoped to promote their newly renamed streaming site, HUYA.com, in South Korea by creating a team built around well-known Korean players. The team was registered under Duowan's Korean subsidiary GE Entertainment.

The initial roster, announced under the name HUYA Tigers, included former members of NaJin Sword, NaJin Shield, and Incredible Miracle 1: top laner Smeb, jungler Lee, mid laner KurO, AD carry PraY, and support GorillA comprised the initial lineup, with NoFe as head coach. Shortly after its formation, the team qualified for the League of Legends Champions Korea Spring Qualifiers, placing first in the group stage over Team Avalanche. They went 2–1 in the final stage and qualified for SBENU Champions Spring 2015. In the Champions Spring pre-season, HUYA Tigers finished tied for third place with KT Rolster, each with 7 points. They renamed to GE Tigers at the start of the Spring Season.

==== 2015 ====
The GE Tigers started out as the top team in Korea in their first season in the LCK, in first place with a 7–0 match record and a 14–2 game record at the end of week 6 of the Spring season. This placement earned them an invitation to the Intel Extreme Masters Season IX – World Championship in March. However, after defeating Cloud9 and SK Gaming to win their group, they lost in the semifinals 2–1 to Team WE – who entered the competition as the 12th-place team in the Chinese League of Legends Pro League (LPL). This led many casters and analysts to label it the biggest upset to date in the entire history of competitive League of Legends. After their return to Korea, the GE Tigers' record worsened, and they dropped sets to both KT Rolster and to SK Telecom T1. They still finished first in the round robin with a 12–2 record, but in the playoffs they lost to SKT and missed out on the 2015 Mid-Season Invitational. Prior to the start of SBENU Champions Summer 2015, the GE Tigers were sponsored by streaming company KooTV and changed their name to the KOO Tigers. KOO ended the regular season of Champions Summer in 4th place. They beat NaJin e-mFire 2–1 and CJ Entus 3–0 to advance to the semi-finals where they played a close series with KT Rolster but lost 3–2, ultimately ending in third place. Because SKT won the finals, KOO automatically qualified for the 2015 League of Legends World Championship as the second seed from Korea with the most circuit points.

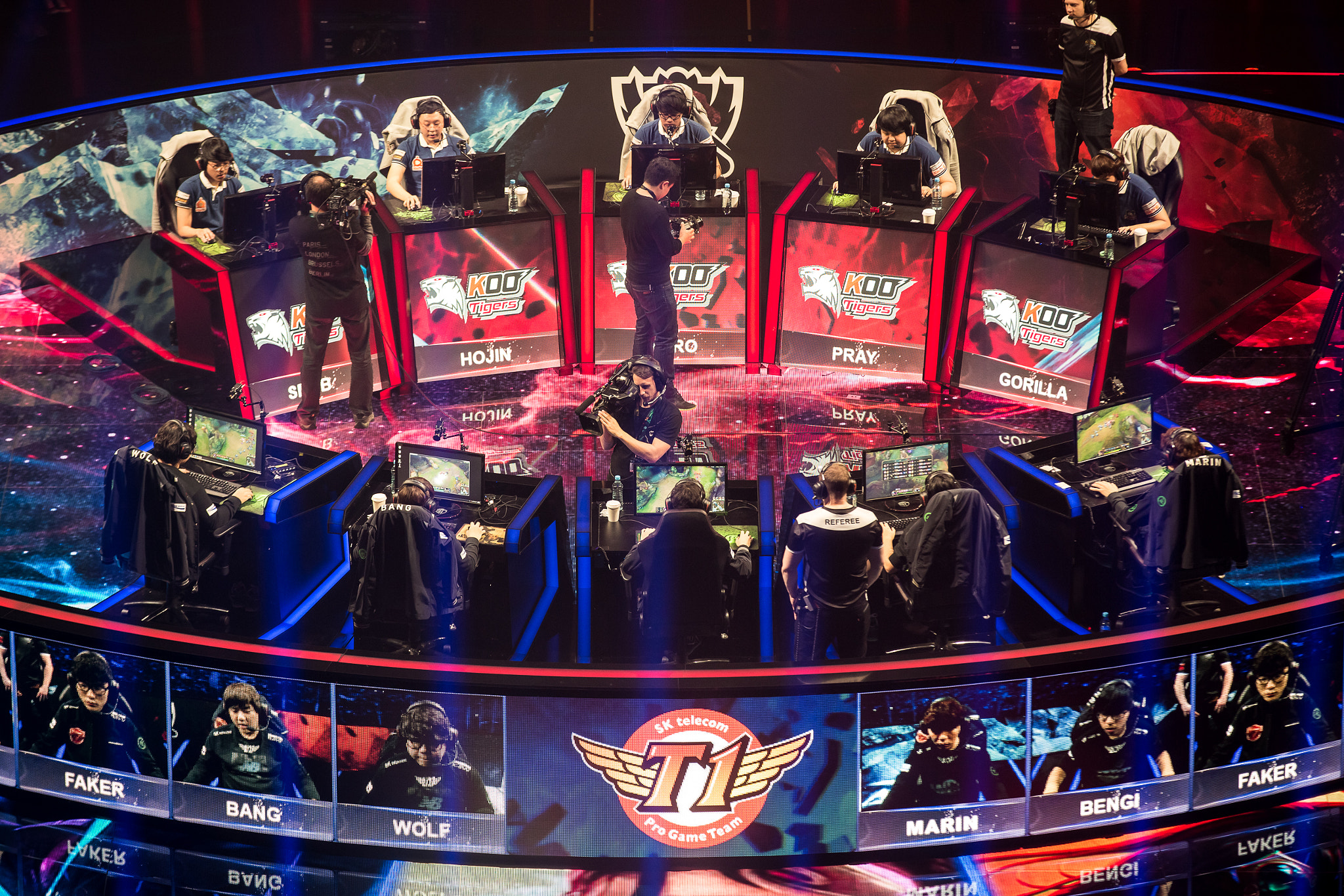
KOO Tigers in the 2015 World Finals

At the World Championship, KOO Tigers finished 2nd in their group with a 4–2 record and advanced to the bracket round. They defeated KT Rolster 3 to 1 in the quarter-finals. On 24 October 2015 they made a clean sweep, 3 to 0, against Fnatic in the semi-finals. The team finished second after losing with a 1–3 record to SK Telecom T1 in the final on 31 October 2015.

KooTV dropped their sponsorship of the team in November, reverting the name to just Tigers. In January 2016, the team once again changed their name, this time to ROX Tigers.

==== 2016 ====
In the LCK Champions spring season, ROX Tigers finished in 1st with 16–2 record. In the finals they faced SKT T1, losing 3–1 and finishing the LCK playoffs in the 2nd place. Despite losing the finals, the team was still praised for their high level of play, achieving near perfect record and the highest team KDA in this season.

Top laner Smeb was named MVP of the spring split and summer split.

=== HLE era ===
==== 2018 ====
In middle 2018, Hanwha Life Insurance acquired the League of Legends team rosters and LCK spot of ROX Tigers. The team also was renamed to Hanwha Life Esports (HLE). They had finished at 6th place of regular summer season and couldn't qualify for Play-off stage.

==== 2024 ====
In the LCK 2024 Spring Season, HLE, whose roster consisted of Doran, Peanut, Zeka, Viper and Delight, has finished in the top 3 teams for the second time in the history of their organization at 3rd place, with a 15-3 record. However, in the playoffs, they were defeated 1-3 by T1 in the lower brackets' final series despite having had a clean sweep 3-0 against T1 in the 2nd round before. Therefore, they missed the chance to attend the 2024 Mid-Season Invitational.

The team achieved their highest place ever in the name of Hanwha Life Esports by finishing the summer season at 2nd place (14-4), behind Gen.G Esports (17-1). In the summer playoffs, they swept T1 again, which then followed by a defeat 1-3 from Gen.G that put HLE, once again, face T1 in the lower brackets' final. This time, they didn't let the spring scenario happen again by beating T1 the fourth time this season with the result of 3-1. On 8 September 2024, although most casters and analysts predicted Gen.G would complete the first ever 5-peat in the LCK history since Summer 2022, HLE proved themselves to be above anyone's expectations by miraculously defeated GEN in 5 games to shut down their championship-winning streak and also their dream of the first ever Golden Road in League of Legends esports history, bringing their organization's first LCK trophy and the second LCK trophy if ROX Tigers' only domestic title was counted. Coincidently, the youngest member in the ROX roster winning the title that year, Peanut, led his team to the 2024 LCK Summer championship.

== Roster ==
Hanwha Life Esports League of Legends roster
Players
Coaches

Role	Handle	Name	Nationality
Top	Zeus	Choi Woo-je	South Korea
Jungle	Kanavi	Seo Jin-hyeok	South Korea
Mid	Zeka	Kim Geon-woo	South Korea
Bot	Gumayusi	Lee Min-hyeong	South Korea
Support	Delight	Yoo Hwan-joong	South Korea

Head coach

Yoon "Homme" Sung-young

Assistant coach(es)

Lee "Mowgli" Jae-ha

Legend:
- (I) Inactive
- (S) Suspended
- Substitute
- (injured) Injury / Illness

Latest roster transaction: 27 November 2025.

== Tournament results ==
=== As Tigers ===
- 2nd – 2015 League of Legends World Championship
- 1st – 2016 Spring League of Legends Champions Korea season
- 2nd – 2016 Spring League of Legends Champions Korea playoffs
- 1st – 2016 Summer League of Legends Champions Korea season
- 1st – 2016 Summer League of Legends Champions Korea playoffs
- 3rd–4th – 2016 League of Legends World Championship
- 1st – 2016 KeSPA Cup
- 3rd–4th – IEM Season 11 World Championship
- 6th – 2017 Spring League of Legends Champions Korea season
- 7th – 2017 Summer League of Legends Champions Korea season
- 9th–12th – 2017 KeSPA Cup
- 6th – 2018 Spring League of Legends Champions Korea season

=== As Hanwha Life Esports ===
- 6th – 2018 Summer League of Legends Champions Korea season
- 13th–19th – 2018 KeSPA Cup
- 6th – 2019 Spring League of Legends Champions Korea season
- 9th – 2019 Summer League of Legends Champions Korea season
- 5th–8th – 2019 KeSPA Cup
- 8th – 2020 Spring League of Legends Champions Korea season
- 9th – 2020 Summer League of Legends Champions Korea season
- 3rd–4th – 2020 KeSPA Cup
- 3rd – 2021 Spring League of Legends Champions Korea season
- 3rd – 2021 Spring League of Legends Champions Korea playoffs
- 8th – 2021 Summer League of Legends Champions Korea season
- 5th–8th – 2021 League of Legends World Championship
- 10th – 2022 Spring League of Legends Champions Korea season
- 10th – 2022 Summer League of Legends Champions Korea season
- 5th – 2023 Spring League of Legends Champions Korea season
- 4th – 2023 Spring League of Legends Champions Korea playoffs
- 3rd – 2023 Summer League of Legends Champions Korea season
- 4th – 2023 Summer League of Legends Champions Korea playoffs
- 3rd – 2024 Spring League of Legends Champions Korea season
- 3rd – 2024 Spring League of Legends Champions Korea playoffs
- 2nd – 2024 Summer League of Legends Champions Korea season
- 1st – 2024 Summer League of Legends Champions Korea playoffs
- 5th–8th – 2024 League of Legends World Championship
- 1st - 2025 LCK Cup
- 1st - 2025 First Stand Tournament
- 5th–8th – 2025 League of Legends World Championship
