= DRX (esports) =

South Korean esports organization

Kiwoom DRX
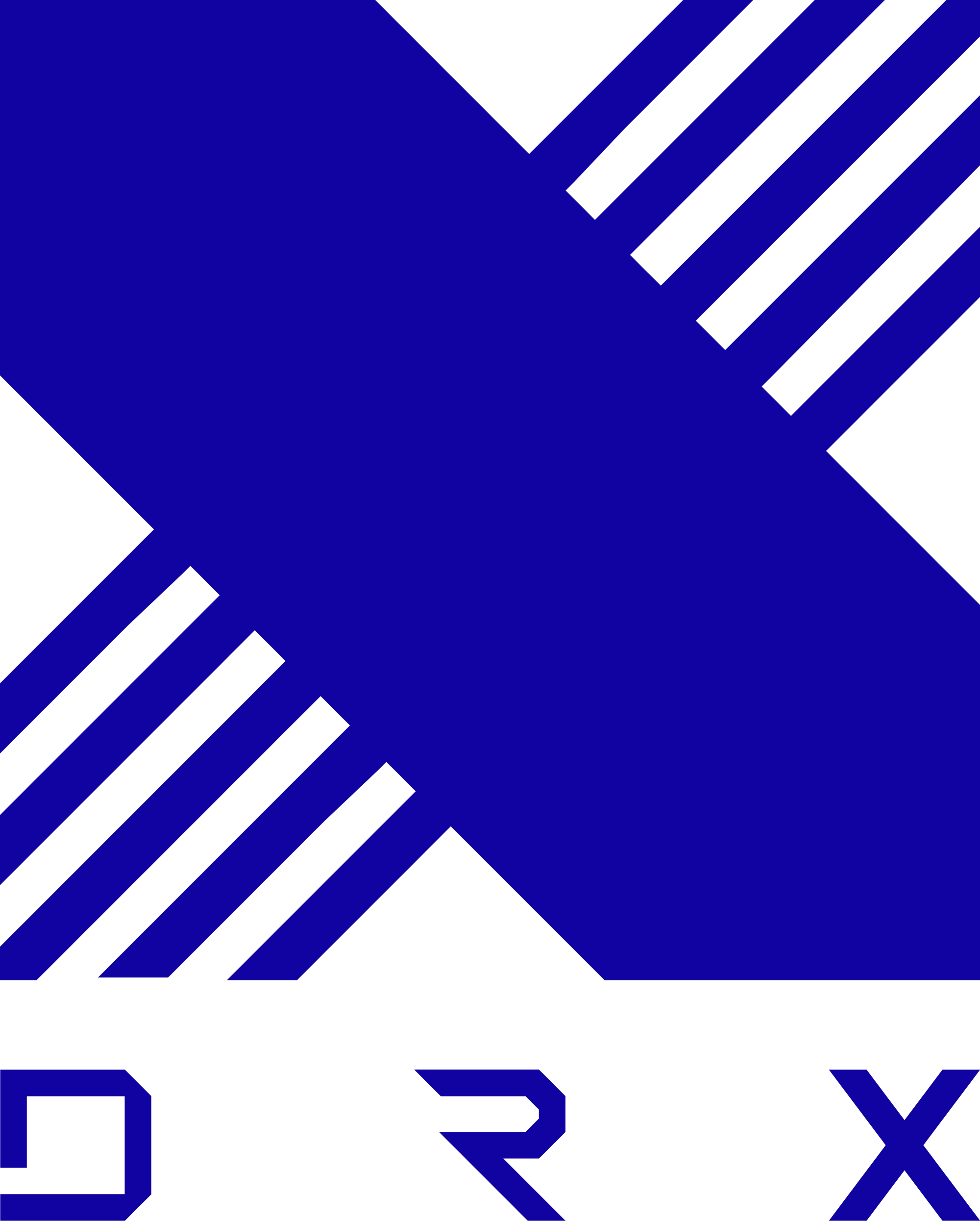
- Divisions: League of Legends; Tekken 8 Valorant; Warcraft
- Team history: League of Legends: Incredible Miracle (2012–2016); Longzhu Gaming (2016–2018); Kingzone DragonX (2018–2019); DragonX (2019–2020); Valorant: Vision Strikers (2020–2021)
- Location: South Korea
- Championships: 1× World Championship (2022)
- League titles: 2× League of Legends Champions Korea
- Partners: Kiwoom Securities, ChildFund Korea, Porsche, ROG, Nissin, Soop, MUSUBii
- Website: www.drx.gg

DRX (initialism derived from the previous name DragonX and currently named Kiwoom DRX for sponsorship reasons) is a South Korean esports organization with teams competing in League of Legends, Tekken 8, Valorant and Warcraft. It previously had teams competing in Honor of Kings and Clash Royale.

DRX's League of Legends division competes in the League of Legends Champions Korea (LCK). It has won two back-to-back LCK titles (2017 Summer and 2018 Spring) and the 2022 edition of the League of Legends World Championship.

== History ==
DRX's League of Legends division was initially named Incredible Miracle in 2012. In January 2016, Incredible Miracle was rebranded as Longzhu Gaming, which took over the name of their sponsor, LongZhu TV.

Longzhu Gaming was acquired by Chinese esports organization Kingzone in January 2018, and was rebranded as Kingzone DragonX (abbreviated as KZ).

In October 2019, Kingzone parted ways with its LoL division, which continued competing as DragonX and was later rebranded as abbreviated name DRX.

== Honours ==
=== League of Legends ===
==== Domestic ====
- League of Legends Champions Korea

Winners: 2017 Summer, (Note: as Longzhu Gaming) 2018 Spring (Note: as Kingzone DragonX)
Runners-up: 2020 Summer

- KeSPA Cup

Runners-up: 2017

==== International ====
- League of Legends World Championship

Winners: 2022

- Mid-Season Invitational

Runners-up: 2018

=== Valorant ===
- VCT Challengers Korea
  - Winners: 2021 Stage 1, (Note: as Vision Strikers) 2021 Stage 3, 2022 Stage 1, 2022 Stage 2
- VCT Pacific League
  - Runners-up: 2023
- VCT Pacific Stage 2
  - Runners-up: 2024
- Valorant Champions
  - Third place: 2022, 2025

== Tournament results ==
=== League of Legends ===
Year		League of Legends Champions Korea						Mid-Season Invitational	World Championship
Year		P	W	L	W–L%	Pos.	Playoffs	Mid-Season Invitational	World Championship
As Longzhu Gaming
2016	Spring	18	8	10	.444	7th	Did not qualify	Did not qualify	Did not qualify
2016	Summer	18	7	11	.389	8th	Did not qualify	Did not qualify	Did not qualify
2017	Spring	18	8	10	.444	7th	Did not qualify	Did not qualify	Quarterfinals
2017	Summer	18	14	4	.778	1st	Winners	Did not qualify	Quarterfinals
As Kingzone DragonX
2018	Spring	18	16	2	.889	1st	Winners	Runners-up	Did not qualify
2018	Summer	18	13	5	.722	3rd	Round 2	Runners-up	Did not qualify
2019	Spring	18	13	5	.722	3rd	Round 3	Did not qualify	Did not qualify
2019	Summer	18	9	9	.500	7th	Did not qualify	Did not qualify	Did not qualify
As DragonX / DRX
2020	Spring	18	14	4	.778	3rd	Round 3	Did not qualify	Quarterfinals
2020	Summer	18	15	3	.833	2nd	Runners-up	Did not qualify	Quarterfinals
2021	Spring	18	9	9	.500	5th	Quarterfinals	Did not qualify	Did not qualify
2021	Summer	18	2	16	.111	10th	Did not qualify	Did not qualify	Did not qualify
2022	Spring	18	11	7	.611	4th	Quarterfinals	Did not qualify	Winners
2022	Summer	18	9	9	.500	6th	Quarterfinals	Did not qualify	Winners
2023	Spring	18	3	15	.167	9th	Did not qualify	Did not qualify	Did not qualify
2023	Summer	18	6	12	.333	6th	Round 1	Did not qualify	Did not qualify
2024	Spring	18	3	15	.167	9th	Did not qualify	Did not qualify	Did not qualify
2024	Summer	18	4	14	.222	9th	Did not qualify	Did not qualify	Did not qualify
In the 2025 season, the LCK Spring and Summer seasons merged into one season.
2025		30	9	21	.300	9th	Did not qualify	Did not qualify	Did not qualify
2026		26	7	19	.269	9th	Did not qualify	Did not qualify	Did not qualify
Totals		380	180	200	.474	(2016–2026, includes only regular season)			

=== Honor of Kings ===
Year	Event	Placement	Last match	Result
2018	2018 Honor of Kings Champion Cup Summer Season	3–4	KZ vs eStar Pro	0–4
2018	Korea King Pro League Autumn 2018	1st	KZ vs ROX Phoenix	4–0
2018	2018 Honor of Kings Champion Cup Winter Season	5–8	Group stage	2–4
2019	Korea King Pro League Spring 2019	3rd	KZ vs Nova Esports	0–4

== Rosters ==
=== League of Legends ===
DRX League of Legends roster
Players
Coaches

Role	Handle	Name	Nationality
Top	Rich	Lee Jae-won	South Korea
Jungle	Vincenzo	Ha Seung-min	South Korea
Jungle	Willer	Kim Jeong-hyeon	South Korea
Mid	Ucal	Son Woo-hyeon	South Korea
Bot	Jiwoo	Jung Ji-woo	South Korea
Support	Andil	Moon Gwan-bin	South Korea

Head coach

Cho "Joker" Jae-eup

Assistant coach(es)

Yoo "Naehyun" Nae-hyun
Lee "Saroo" Jong-won

Legend:
- (I) Inactive
- (S) Suspended
- Substitute
- (injured) Injury / Illness

Roster updated 19 January 2026.

=== Valorant ===
DRX Valorant roster
Players
Coaches

Handle	Name	Nationality
MaKo	Kim Myeong-kwan	South Korea
BeYN	Kang Ha-bin	South Korea
Hyunmin	Song Hyun-min	South Korea
free1ng	No Ha-jun	South Korea
Flashback	Cho Min-hyeok	South Korea
Estrella	Park Geon	South Korea

Head coach

Pyeon "termi" Seon-ho

Assistant coach(es)

- Kwon "Argency" Soon-woo
- Kim "glow" Min-soo

Legend:
- (I) Inactive
- (S) Suspended
- Substitute
- (injured) Injury / Illness

Roster updated 4 October 2025.

=== DRX FGC ===
Player	Name
Knee	Bae Jae-min
Chanel	Kang Seong-ho
Infested	Park Byung-ho
poka	Shunsuke Abe
Leshar	Shin Moon-sup

=== Crossfire ===
DRX Crossfire roster
Players
Coaches

Role	Handle	Name	Nationality
Sniper	TGM	Vũ Văn Lương	Vietnam
IGL	KZ	Phạm Quốc Khánh	Vietnam
Tanker	Timber	Nguyễn Việt Tiến	Vietnam
Entry	MeoU	Nguyễn Trần Xuân Huy	Vietnam
Supporter	SP	Nguyễn Hiếu Trung	Vietnam
Sniper	MJ	Nguyễn Văn Chiến	Vietnam

Head coach

N/A

Legend:
- (I) Inactive
- (S) Suspended
- Substitute
- (injured) Injury / Illness

Roster updated 20 April 2026.

== Notes ==
Awards and achievements
Preceded by Edward Gaming	League of Legends World Championship winner 2022; With: Kingen, Pyosik, Zeka, Deft, BeryL	Succeeded by T1
