= 2022 League of Legends World Championship final =

League of Legends esports series

2022 League of Legends World Championship Final
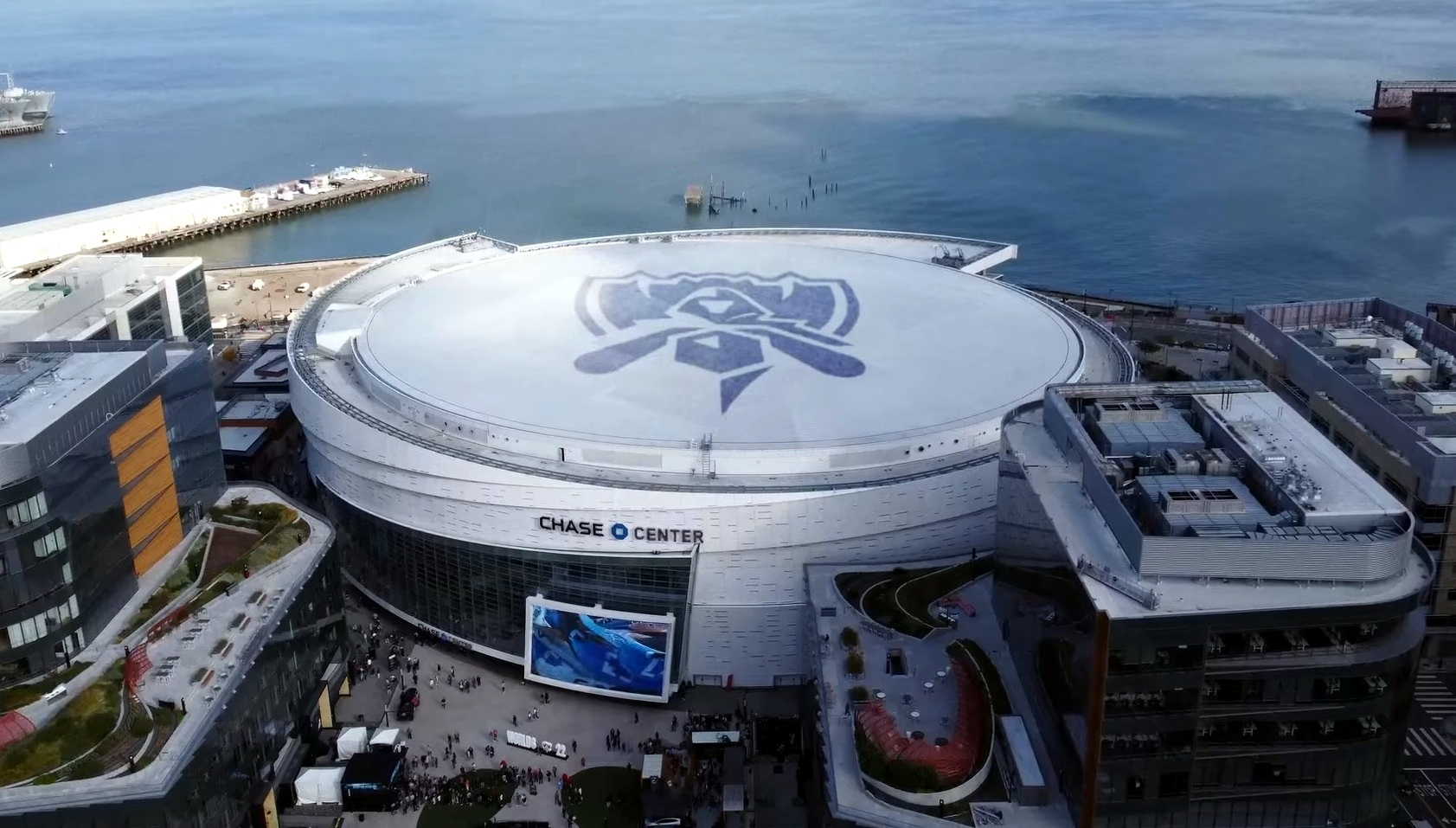
- The Chase Center hosted the tournament's final.
| DRX | T1 |
| 3 | 2 |
- Date: 5 November 2022
- Venue: Chase Center, San Francisco
- MVP: Hwang "Kingen" Seong-hoon

Live Broadcast
- Announcers: English; Clayton "CaptainFlowers" Raines; Marc "Caedrel" Lamont; Sam "Kobe" Hartman-Kenzler Korean; Chun "Caster Jun" Yong-jun; Lee "CloudTemplar" Hyun-woo; Kang "KangQui" Seung-hyeon; Jo "CoreJJ" Yong-in
- Viewers: Worldwide; 5.1 million concurrent peak viewers

The 2022 League of Legends World Championship final was a League of Legends (LoL) esports series between T1 and DRX on 5 November 2022 at the Chase Center in San Francisco, California, United States. It marked the twelfth final of a LoL World Championship. Both T1 and DRX were two of four representatives from the League of Legends Champions Korea (LCK) at the tournament, the others being Gen.G and DWG KIA. It was T1's first appearance in the final since the 2017 edition and the first time a play-in team made a tournament run to the final, with DRX starting their tournament from the play-in stage as the LCK's fourth seed, barely qualifying through the regional qualifiers.

The series was a best of five and was played in front of 18,000 spectators, with 5.1 million concurrent peak viewers, which was the highest in the tournament's history at the time. The series ended 3–2 in favor of DRX after a back-and-forth five-game series, and was considered the completion of a Cinderella run by commentators, with many regarding it as one of the greatest finals in the history of League of Legends.

DRX's top laner Hwang "Kingen" Seong-hoon earned Most Valuable Player honors. The series marked the first international victory for DRX and support Cho "BeryL" Geon-hee's second world championship, making him one of the two active players alongside Lee "Faker" Sang-hyeok, who also played in the series in his fifth finals appearance, to have more than one world championship after winning the title with DWG KIA in 2020. It also marked the first world championship for ADC Kim "Deft" Hyuk-kyu, who was reportedly in his final year of professional play before eventually deciding to continue playing for two more seasons before entering mandatory military service in South Korea, and his second international title after winning the 2015 Mid-Season Invitational with Edward Gaming, whom DRX also faced en route to the finals and were the defending champions heading into Worlds.

== Background ==
A simplified representation of Summoner's Rift. The yellow paths are the "lanes" down which minions march; blue and red dots represent turrets. The fountains are the dark areas within each base, and are beside each Nexus. The dotted black line indicates the river.

League of Legends is a 2009 multiplayer online battle arena (MOBA) video game developed by Riot Games. Each year, Riot hosts a World Championship (Worlds) featuring the most successful teams globally throughout the year-long season. The 2022 Worlds, the twelfth edition of the World Championship, as with its predecessors, was played on the map "Summoner's Rift", a play-field featuring three lanes defined by their location—top, middle, and bottom—and two jungle quadrants, mirrored diagonally down a neutral zone known as the river. Summoner's Rift is played by ten players, five per team, through an isometric perspective as players control characters, known as "champions", split between five roles respective on their location on the map: top, jungle, middle, attack damage carry, and support. The latter two are both played in the bottom lane. (Note: The roles in League of Legends are often referred to in the community as "top laner", "jungler", "midlaner", "ADC" (Attack Damage Carry), and "support". The latter two are conjunctively known as "botlaners".) The two teams are referred to as red and blue. The red team spawns in the top right and the blue team spawns in the bottom left.

In professional play, players choose their champions during champion select. This consists of four phases: banning phase and picking phase, both of which occur twice. The blue team starts, banning one champion at their discretion. This is then interchanged between the teams until six total champions have been banned, three per team. Blue side then picks their first champion, followed by red side selecting two champions before blue side completes the first phase of picking and banning by also locking in two champions. The teams then begin the second banning phase, starting with red side. The teams interchange until four additional champions have been banned, for a total of ten. Red side also initiates the second picking phase by selecting one champion. Blue side then responds by picking two champions before red side finalises the process by locking in the final champion.

The ultimate goal of the game is to destroy the enemy team's Nexus. This is accomplished through leveling up and purchasing items with gold, the in-game currency. In the lanes there are turrets and inhibitors, defensive objectives for the opposing team to destroy (at least one must be destroyed for the Nexus to take damage), as well as a constant stream of minions that can be killed for gold and experience. Similarly, the jungle contains monsters that reward gold and experience upon defeating them. In the river, there are two major neutral objectives. The Rift Herald spawns on the top side of the river and on death, rewards the team with an active item that respawns the Rift Herald, dealing significant damage to the opposing team's defensive structures. At 20 minutes in, the Rift Herald disappears and is replaced by Baron Nashor. Baron Nashor provides the team that kills it with substantial buffs. On the bottom side of the map, dragons spawn. Random elemental dragons that provide small permanent buffs to the acquiring team continue to spawn until 35 minutes in, at which point the Elder Dragon will spawn that upon being slain, provides the team with a powerful temporary buff. Gold and experience points are also obtained through killing these neutral monsters.

== Route to the final ==
=== T1 ===
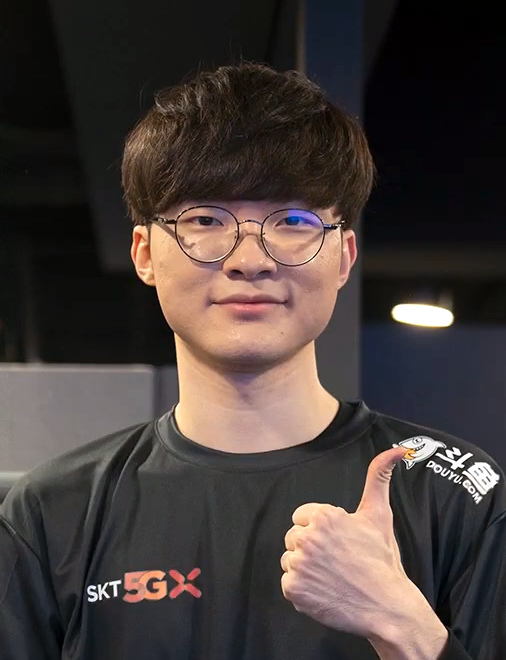
Faker in a January 2020 interview.

Heading into the 2022 Worlds Final, T1 was in the midst of an international title drought since their last major international championship, that being the 2017 Mid-Season Invitational. The team's last Worlds title came during the 2016 edition, which was coincidentally the last Worlds to be held in North America, when T1, then known as SK Telecom T1, won their third world championship after beating Samsung Galaxy, 3–2. A year later, they failed to defend their title as they were defeated by the same team in a 3–0 sweep. Since then, the team won the 2019 League of Legends Champions Korea (LCK) Spring and Summer Splits, as well as the 2020 Spring Split. However, T1 failed to make it to the finals of the 2019 Mid-Season Invitational, the 2019 and 2021 League of Legends World Championship, as well as not qualifying for the 2018 and 2020 editions of Worlds. In November 2020, T1 signed Ryu "Keria" Min-seok as their new support for the 2021 season, transferring from DRX. Around the same time, toplaner Choi "Zeus" Woo-je and jungler Mun "Oner" Hyeon-jun were called up from the T1 Academy to the main roster. ADC Lee "Gumayusi" Min-hyeong had been called up in November 2019. In early December 2021, T1 announced their roster for the 2022 LCK season.

T1 was one of the most dominant teams throughout 2022, both domestically and internationally. In the LCK, they would go on a perfect 18–0 record in the 2022 Spring Split, qualifying outright to the semifinals. This was an achievement no other LCK team has accomplished until that point. In the playoffs, T1 would complete the sweep against Kwangdong Freecs in the semifinals before beating Gen.G in the finals with a scoreline of 3–1 to win the Spring Split. T1's victory qualified them for the 2022 Mid-Season Invitational (MSI), which would be hosted by South Korea. In that tournament, T1 would finish the group stage with another perfect record of 6–0, qualifying them for the tournament's rumble stage. In the rumble stage, T1 had a mixed start, going 2–2 in their first four games before winning five of their last six games to finish the rumble stage as the second seed with a 7–3 win-loss slate. In the semifinals, T1 beat G2 Esports with a 3–0 sweep to qualify for their first MSI Final since the 2017 edition of the event. However, they would suffer a 2–3 defeat to League of Legends Pro League (LPL) representative Royal Never Give Up in the finals. In the Summer Split, T1 would finish as the second seed with a 15–3 win-loss record, qualifying them outright for the semifinals where they would beat DWG KIA with a 3–2 series win. However, the team would suffered a 3–0 sweep in the finals against Gen.G. Despite the loss, T1 garnered the most championship points, giving them an outright qualification to the 2022 World Championship. This would mark T1's eighth Worlds appearance and their third as T1.

In the group stage, T1 was seeded into Group A alongside defending champions Edward Gaming, Fnatic, and Cloud9. After their win over EDG in their first game of the tournament, they suffered a loss to Fnatic in their next game. However, T1 finished the group stage on a four-game winning streak, topping the group with a 5–1 win-loss record. Having advanced from groups into the knockout stage, T1 avenged their MSI 2022 finals loss against Royal Never Give Up in the quarterfinals, 3–2, before beating JD Gaming with a 3–1 series win to advance to their fifth League of Legends World Championship Final.

T1's route to the final
| Round | Opponent | Result |
|---|---|---|
| Group Stage | Edward Gaming | 1–0 |
| Group Stage | Fnatic | 0–1 |
| Group Stage | Cloud9 | 1–0 |
| Group Stage | Fnatic | 1–0 |
| Group Stage | Cloud9 | 1–0 |
| Group Stage | Edward Gaming | 1–0 |
| Quarterfinals | Royal Never Give Up | 3–0 |
| Semifinals | JD Gaming | 3–1 |

=== DRX ===
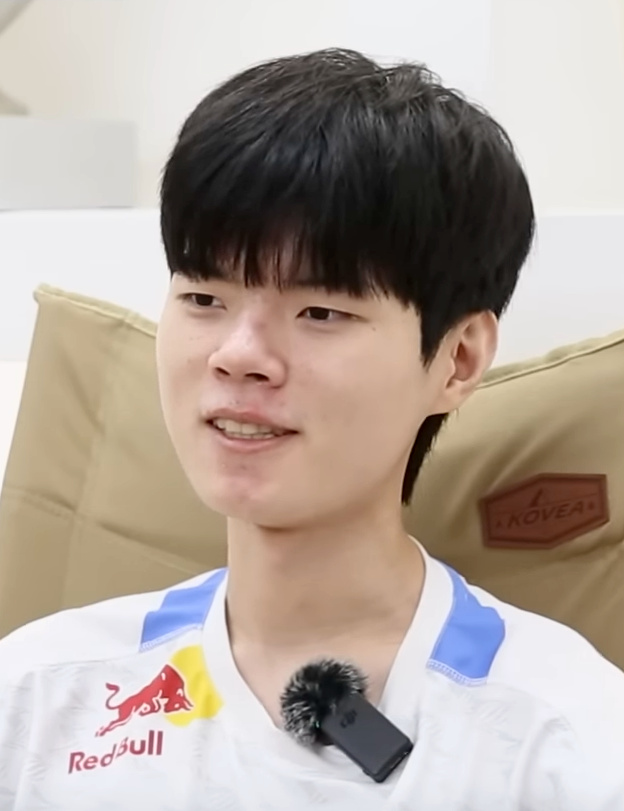
Deft during an interview before the start of 2022 Worlds.

Prior to the 2020s, DRX had won two League of Legends Champions Korea (LCK) titles — 2017 Summer as "Longzhu Gaming" and 2018 Spring as "Kingzone DragonX", a runner-up finish at the 2018 Mid-Season Invitational and a quarterfinal appearance at the 2017 League of Legends World Championship. However, with the turn of a new decade came struggles for the team, both domestically and internationally. Despite another runner-up finish at the 2020 Summer Split, DRX failed to make it past the quarterfinals in three splits from 2021 to 2022. Moreover, the team suffered a 2–16 record in the 2021 Summer Split, a far cry from their Spring Split performance in the same year where they finished with a 9–9 win-loss slate. After the 2021 season, the team saw a major roster change, as Cho "BeryL" Geon-hee, previously of DWG KIA and was coming off two consecutive Worlds finals appearances, joined as their new support. Veteran ADC Kim "Deft" Hyuk-kyu would return for his second stint with the team, transferring from Hanwha Life Esports, and Kim "Zeka" Geon-woo joined as the team new midlaner, transferring from the LPL's Bilibili Gaming. All three players would join toplaner Hwang "Kingen" Seong-hoon and jungler Hong "Pyosik" Chang-hyeon for the 2022 LCK season, the latter of which was the longest-tenured player in the team at the time.

The newly revamped roster would have a slow start to the 2022 Spring Split, losing their first three games before nailing their first victory of the split against Kwangdong Freecs. However, despite eventually finishing fourth with an 11–7 win-loss record, DRX would lose to the same team in the quarterfinals, 2–3. After the Spring Split and the 2022 Mid-Season Invitational, the Summer Split commenced. Here, DRX would finish the first two weeks with an undefeated record, eventually finishing with a 9–9 win-loss slate. The team would once again reach the quarterfinals as the 6th seed, but they suffered a 1–3 defeat to Liiv Sandbox. After the domestic season, DRX still had a chance to make it to the 2022 World Championship through the LCK Regional Finals, which determined the third and fourth seeds from the LCK to qualify for Worlds. The team was placed in the lower-bracket semifinal against KT Rolster and won with a result of 3–2, before beating Liiv Sandbox in the lower-bracket final with a similar scoreline to notch the last LCK spot in the tournament. This would mark the team's third Worlds appearance and their second as DRX, having qualified for the 2017 edition as "Longzhu Gaming."

DRX was seeded into Group B in the play-in stage alongside 2022 MSI champions Royal Never Give Up, MAD Lions, Saigon Buffalo, Isurus, and Istanbul Wildcats. With dominant performances from players such as Zeka, DRX finished first in their group, qualifying them for the group stage with an undefeated 5–0 record. The team was then placed in Group B of the group stage, alongside Top Esports, Rogue, and GAM Esports. Despite a loss to Rogue in their opening match, the team went on a four-game winning streak before losing to TES in their final game, setting up a tiebreaker match between Rogue and DRX, with the latter winning to secure the top spot in the group, qualifying for the quarterfinals. Having progressed into the knockout stage, DRX pulled off a reverse sweep against then-defending champions Edward Gaming in the quarterfinals, before beating fellow LCK team Gen.G in the semifinals with a 3–1 series win to reach the 2022 League of Legends World Championship Final, setting up an all-LCK final against T1.

DRX's route to the final
| Round | Opponent | Result |
|---|---|---|
| Play-In Stage | Royal Never Give Up | 1–0 |
| Play-In Stage | Saigon Buffalo | 1–0 |
| Play-In Stage | Istanbul Wildcats | 1–0 |
| Play-In Stage | Isurus | 1–0 |
| Play-In Stage | MAD Lions | 1–0 |
| Group Stage | Rogue | 0–1 |
| Group Stage | Top Esports | 1–0 |
| Group Stage | GAM Esports | 1–0 |
| Group Stage | Rogue | 1–0 |
| Group Stage | GAM Esports | 1–0 |
| Group Stage | Top Esports | 0–1 |
| Tiebreaker | Rogue | 1–0 |
| Quarterfinals | Edward Gaming | 3–2 |
| Semifinals | Gen.G | 3–1 |

== Background and pre-series ==
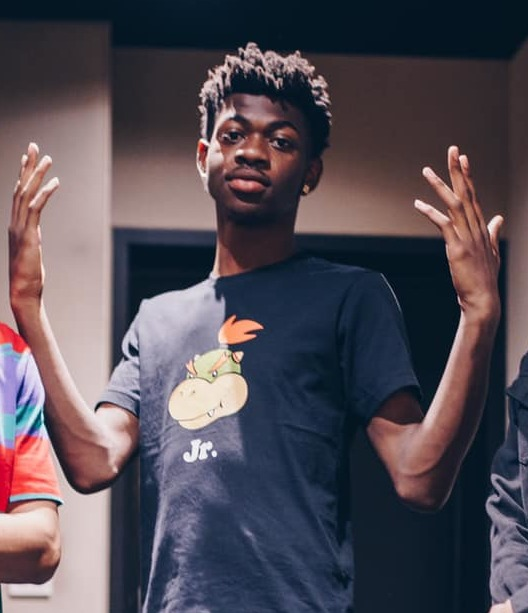
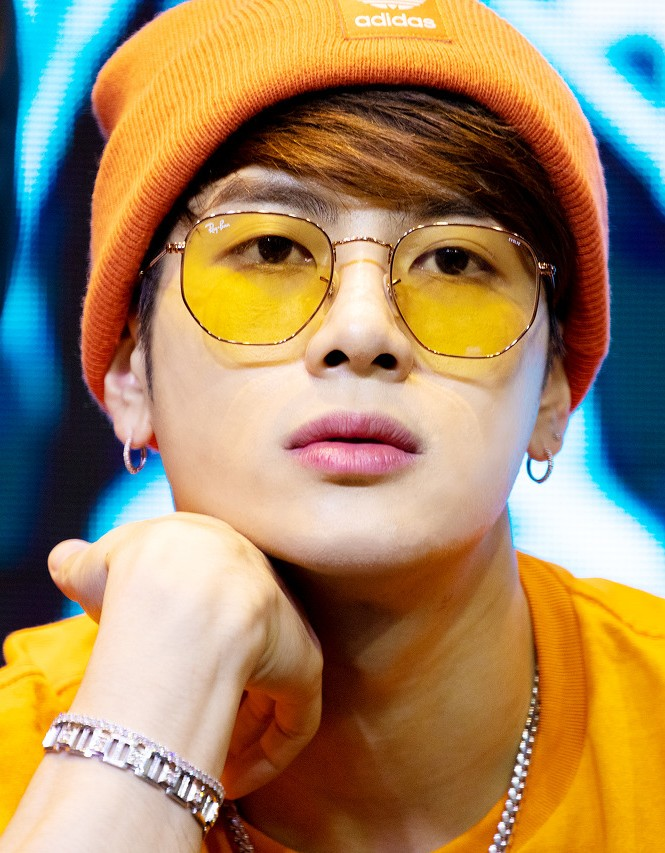
Lil Nas X and Jackson Wang performed during the opening ceremony.

T1 and DRX were alongside Gen.G and DWG KIA in representing the LCK. This series marked the first time Faker and Deft had faced each other in the Worlds Finals, as both players attended the same school during their high school years in Mapo High School, with Faker making his fifth appearance and Deft making his first. Moreover, this series was also DRX's first appearance in the finals, despite them having made two quarterfinal appearances in past World Championships. The Finals were a best-of-five series, with the first team to win a total of three games being crowned the champions.

The series was held on 5 November 2022 at the Chase Center in San Francisco, California, United States. In November 2021, Riot Games announced the venue as the host of the finals before a Golden State Warriors home game against the Toronto Raptors. The event was livestreamed via Twitch.tv and YouTube, as well as through the official LoL Esports website. Prior to the commencement of the games, Riot held an opening ceremony featuring performances from musical artists that had collaborated with League of Legends throughout the year. This began at 17:00 local time (UTC−08:00). The ceremony began with Edda Hayes performing "The Call," as the T1 and DRX players were initially presented to the crowd. The song was released in conjunction with the start of the game's twelfth season. This was immediately followed by Jackson Wang, performing "Fire to the Fuse," a collaborative track between 88rising and League of Legends. Finally, the 2022 World Championship promotion song "Star Walkin" was performed by Lil Nas X, with the T1 and DRX players being presented once more to the crowd along with the Summoner's Cup at the center of the stage as the opening ceremony concluded. Throughout the ceremony, correlated 2D laser and video projections were cast onto scrims surrounding the stage.

The English language streams were cast by Clayton "CaptainFlowers" Raines and Sam "Kobe" Hartman-Kenzler of the League Championship Series (LCS), and Marc "Caedrel" Lamont of the League of Legends European Championship (LEC). (Note: The LEC eventually changed "European" to "EMEA" at the start of the 2023 season.) The Korean language streams were cast by League of Legends Champions Korea (LCK) casters Chun "Caster Jun" Yong-jun, Lee "CloudTemplar" Hyun-woo, Kang "KangQui" Seung-hyeon, and Team Liquid support Jo "CoreJJ" Yong-in.

=== Team line-ups ===
Neither team made any line-up changes going into the finals. T1's coaches were Bae "Bengi" Seong-woong and Kim "moment" Ji-hwan, while DRX's coaches were Kim "Ssong" Sang-soo and Lee "Mowgli" Jae-ha.

| Role | T1 | DRX |
|---|---|---|
| Top | Choi "Zeus" Woo-je | Hwang "Kingen" Seong-hoon |
| Jungle | Mun "Oner" Hyeon-jun | Hong "Pyosik" Chang-hyeon |
| Middle | Lee "Faker" Sang-hyeok | Kim "Zeka" Geon-woo |
| ADC | Lee "Gumayusi" Min-hyeong | Kim "Deft" Hyuk-kyu |
| Support | Ryu "Keria" Min-seok | Cho "BeryL" Geon-hee |

== Series ==
=== Game 1 ===
Game 1 Team Compositions
| Role | T1 | DRX |
|---|---|---|
| Top | Yone | Aatrox |
| Jungle | Lee Sin | Viego |
| Middle | Azir | Sylas |
| ADC | Varus | Sivir |
| Support | Renata Glasc | Heimerdinger |

The champion selection phase for the first game commenced shortly after the conclusion of the opening ceremony. T1 were on blue side which gave them the opportunity to ban and pick the first champions of the game. In the first banning phase, T1 opted to ban Akali, Sejuani, and Ashe, while DRX banned Yuumi; a champion that had a perfect win rate throughout the tournament; Lucian; and Caitlyn. Following the first ban phase, T1 first picked Varus, for Gumayusi who had won every game he's played when picking the said champion leading up to the finals. DRX responded by picking Aatrox; for Kingen; and Viego; for Pyosik. For the remaining picks of the first pick phase, T1 chose Yone for Zeus; a pick meant to counter the Aatrox selection; and Renata Glasc for Keria, and DRX chose Sylas for Zeka as their final pick. Before the second pick phase, DRX banned Ryze and Graves, and T1 banned Rell and Ezreal. As DRX were on red side, they got the first pick of the second pick phase, selecting Heimerdinger for BeryL. For their last two draft selections, T1 selected Lee Sin; for Oner; and Azir; for Faker, the latter of which as a counter to DRX's selections in top and jungle and was Faker's best champion in the tournament heading into the finals. DRX's last pick was Sivir for Deft.

Game 1 ended in 31:10 minutes, with a final kill scoreline of 15–5, in favour of T1.

=== Game 2 ===
Game 2 Team Compositions
| Role | DRX | T1 |
|---|---|---|
| Top | Camille | Aatrox |
| Jungle | Viego | Graves |
| Middle | Sylas | Viktor |
| ADC | Varus | Ashe |
| Support | Heimerdinger | Lux |

For the first banning phase of the second game, DRX chose to ban Lucian for the second time, Ryze, and Renata Glasc; while T1 opted to ban Yuumi, Caitlyn for the second straight game, and Sejuani, also for the second straight matchup. As DRX were on blue side for the first time in the match, they got the first pick of the first picking phase, locking in Varus for Deft. T1 responded by picking Ashe for Gumayusi; a champion that was banned by T1 in the first game; and Aatrox for Zeus. For their last two picks before the second banning phase, DRX chose Heimerdinger for BeryL for the second-straight game, and Camille for Kingen. T1 concluded the first picking phase by selecting Lux for Keria. DRX then banned Nocturne and Azir, who was played by Faker in the first game; getting the highest K/D/A of 6/1/4; and T1 banned Akali and Kindred, the latter being the champion Pyosik has a perfect win rate at this point in the tournament until DRX's defeat in Game 1. T1, now on red side; chose Graves for Oner; and DRX selected Viego for Pyosik; another champion whom he had a perfect record with in the tournament leading up to the finals; and Sylas for Zeka. T1's final pick of the draft was Viktor for Faker.

Game 2 was the longest game of the series, ending after 46:11 minutes, with a close final kill scoreline of 17–13, in favour of DRX.

=== Game 3 ===
Game 3 Team Compositions
| Role | T1 | DRX |
|---|---|---|
| Top | Gragas | Ornn |
| Jungle | Graves | Viego |
| Middle | Azir | Sylas |
| ADC | Varus | Kalista |
| Support | Karma | Renata Glasc |

The first banning phase of Game 3 was similar to that of the first game, with T1 opting to ban Akali, Sejuani, and Ashe; while DRX banned Yuumi, Lucian, and Caitlyn, who remains banned at this point in the series for the third consecutive time. Now at blue side once again, T1 selected Varus for Gumayusi for the second time in the match. DRX countered with two bottom lane picks; Kalista for Deft and Renata Glasc for BeryL, the first time both champions were paired in the series. For their final two selections before the second banning phase, T1 locked in Azir for Faker; a champion critical in their team's Game 1 victory; and Karma for Keria. For the third consecutive game, Sylas was picked by DRX for Zeka. T1 then banned Aatrox; a champion Kingen had a 3–1 record in the tournament until their Game 1 loss; and Kindred; whom Pyosik has a perfect win rate on. Meanwhile, DRX opted to ban Yone and Lee Sin. Beginning the second picking phase, DRX selected Viego; for Pyosik; to which T1 would respond by selecting Graves; for Oner; considered a counter to DRX's low-range composition; and Gragas; for Zeus. DRX then locked in Ornn; for Kingen; matching the Gragas as top-lane tanks.

Game 3 ended in 32:11 minutes, with a tied final kill scoreline of 12-12.

=== Game 4 ===
Game 4 Team Compositions
| Role | DRX | T1 |
|---|---|---|
| Top | Aatrox | Fiora |
| Jungle | Maokai | Sejuani |
| Middle | Azir | Akali |
| ADC | Varus | Kalista |
| Support | Renata Glasc | Soraka |

T1 were at match point and a win would seal their fourth World championship. Returning to blue side, DRX again had the opportunity to ban and pick the first champions of the game. In the first banning phase, DRX banned Lucian, Ashe, and Ryze; a champion Faker has used in two victories in T1's semifinal win over JD Gaming with a KDA of 3.0. For T1, they opted to ban Caitlyn; for the fourth consecutive game; Yuumi, and Heimerdinger. DRX began the first picking phase, selecting Varus for Deft; a champion that has not lost a game and has been a crucial selection for both teams at this point in the series. T1 responded by locking in Kalista for Gumayusi; and Sejuani for Oner; meant to deny Pyosik a champion that pairs well with other champions such as Aatrox and Akali. For their final pick before the second banning phase, DRX selected Renata Glasc for BeryL; as a response to the Kalista pick; and Azir for Zeka. For their final selection before the second banning phase, T1 picked Soraka for Keria, which casters described as a "utility" pick. Before the second pick phase, DRX banned Viktor and Yone; limiting Faker to a melee champion and denying Zeus a counter to Aatrox; while T1 banned Kindred and Viego; the latter of which Pyosik has used in all three games. T1 then selected Akali for Faker, to which DRX responded by picking Aatrox for Kingen; and Maokai for Pyosik; meant to counter T1's picks in both middle and bottom lanes. Fiora was T1's final selection; for Zeus.

Game 4 was the shortest game of the series, ending at only 28:44 minutes, with a tied final kill scoreline of 14–4, in favour of DRX.

=== Game 5 ===
Game 5 Team Compositions
| Role | T1 | DRX |
|---|---|---|
| Top | Gwen | Aatrox |
| Jungle | Viego | Hecarim |
| Middle | Viktor | Azir |
| ADC | Varus | Caitlyn |
| Support | Karma | Bard |

Heading into Game 5, no team has won a game from red side. As they were on the said side in Game 4, T1 was on blue side whilst DRX was in red. The first banning phase saw T1 opting to ban Akali, Heimerdinger, and Renata Glasc, while DRX banned Yuumi, Lucian, and Lux in a surprising move. It was the first time in the series that Caitlyn was not banned by either team. In the first picking phase, T1 selected Karma for Keria. DRX responded by locking in Azir for Zeka; Faker's best champion; and Caitlyn for Deft, a champion he has a perfect win rate on and as a response to the Karma selection; leading the casters to speculate an impending surprise support pick for DRX. For their next two picks, T1 selected Varus for Gumayusi and Viktor for Faker. Concluding the first picking phase was DRX picking Aatrox for Kingen, a champion he has used twice at this point in the series. For their final two bans, DRX banned Yone and Lee Sin, while T1 banned Sejuani and Kindred; the latter of which was described as a "pocket pick" for Pyosik. For the second picking phase, DRX locked in Bard for BeryL in a surprising selection; as a counter to the immobility of T1's selections in both middle and bottom lanes. In their final two picks, T1 chose Viego for Oner and Gwen for Zeus; and DRX locked in Hecarim for Pyosik to round out the draft. The final two selections were met by loud cheers from the audience at the Chase Center.

Game 5 was the second game of the series to reach 40+ minutes, ending at 42:09 minutes, with a final kill scoreline of 19–10, in favour of DRX, who would win their first world championship title.

== Post-series ==
DRX's victory marked the first time a 4th seed won the world championship. The tournament had a base prize pool of US$2.225 million. Of this, the winners, DRX, received 22% ($489,500) of the pool. For coming second, T1 was rewarded 15% ($333,750). As with previous world champions, DRX worked directly with Riot's visual department to release skins for their chosen champions, with one per player. The skins imitate the team's design, hence DRX's skins were mostly colored in blue and showed its logo on recall animations, as well as signatures from each player. The chosen champions were Aatrox, picked by Kingen; Kindred, picked by Pyosik; Akali, picked by Zeka; Caitlyn, picked by Deft; Ashe, picked by BeryL; and Maokai, picked by Lee "Juhan" Ju-han, the team's substitute jungler who made two appearances for the team during the play-in stage, meeting Riot Games' criteria. He also made an appearance in DRX's first group stage match against Rogue. For the first time, a prestige skin was also released with Kingen's Aatrox, commemorating his Finals MVP award during the tournament.

In the build-up to the 2023 League of Legends World Championship in South Korea, Riot Games released the tournament's promotional song, "Gods" (stylized in caps), which was performed by South Korean girl group NewJeans. The song's music video featured Deft as the main protagonist, showcasing his past World Championship stints up until the 2022 edition, famously showing him facing his former teammates on his path to the world championship in 2022 (Tian "Meiko" Ye in EDG, Choi "Doran" Hyeon-joon in Gen.G, and Ryu "Keria" Min-seok in T1).

In the following season, DRX would fail to qualify for the 2023 edition of Worlds after losing to Dplus KIA (formerly known as DWG KIA) in the 2023 LCK Regional Finals. Weeks after the 2022 Worlds Final, DRX announced that the contracts of Kingen, Pyosik, Zeka, Deft, and BeryL had expired. Deft would stay in the LCK, joining Dplus KIA for the 2023 season, as well as Kingen and Zeka, both joining Hanwha Life Esports. Pyosik moved to the League Championship Series in North America, joining Team Liquid. BeryL was the only player to re-sign with DRX for the following season, while Juhan also stayed with the team. However, heading into the 2024 LCK season, three former members of the DRX squad teamed up once again as Deft, Pyosik, and BeryL all signed with KT Rolster. Juhan would also switch regions at the start of the 2024 season, signing with GiantX's Academy Team before being promoted to its main roster for the League of Legends EMEA Championship before returning to DRX for the 2025 season.

T1 kept the same roster for the 2023 LCK season, finishing as runners-up in both Spring and Summer Splits and making the semifinals of the 2023 Mid-Season Invitational in London. Despite not winning a domestic title, the team would have the most championship points, securing qualification for the 2023 edition of Worlds. T1 would finish their group Swiss stage campaign with a 3–1 record, losing only to the LCK's first seed, Gen.G in the 1-0 bracket. Having qualified for the knockout stage, T1 went through teams from China's League of Legends Pro League (LPL), sweeping LNG Esports 3–0 in the quarterfinals, defeating 2023 MSI champions JD Gaming in the semifinals, 3–1, in a rematch from the last tournament, and scoring another sweep against Weibo Gaming in the finals, 3–0, to win their record-extending fourth world championship in their sixth finals appearance. Top-laner Choi "Zeus" Woo-je would earn Finals MVP honors in the tournament. T1 was also famously the only team from the LCK to qualify for the semifinals, as fellow quarterfinalists Gen.G and KT Rolster failed to advance, losing to Bilibili Gaming and JD Gaming, respectively.
