= Order (esports) =

Australian esports organisation (2017–2022)

ORDER
- Founded: November 2017
- Folded: 2022
- Based in: Melbourne
- Location: Australia
- Owner: Gerard Murphy
- Divisions: Counter-Strike: Global Offensive; FIFA; League of Legends; Rainbow Six Siege; Street Fighter V; Valorant
- Website: ordergaming.gg

Order (stylised as ORDER) was an Australian professional esports organisation based in Melbourne. ORDER was one of the largest esports organisation in Australia fielding competitive rosters in: Counter-Strike: Global Offensive, FIFA, League of Legends, Rainbow Six Siege, Overwatch, Street Fighter V, and Valorant. The organisation entered voluntary administration on 17 August 2022 and eventually folded in November 2022.

== League of Legends ==
=== History ===
==== Founding ====
Order acquired the Oceanic Pro League (OPL) spot of Team Regicide on 14 December 2017. Its inaugural roster consisted of top laner James "Tally" Shute, jungler Samuel "Spookz" Broadley, mid laner Simon "Swiffer" Papamarkos, bot laner Ian "FBI" Victor Huang, and support Jake "Rogue" Sharwood.

==== 2018 season ====
Order placed third in the regular season of OPL 2018 Split 1, qualifying them for the second round of playoffs. Legacy Esports defeated Order after a close series and knocked them out of playoffs. In Split 2, Order once again placed third in the regular season and was once again knocked out of playoffs by Legacy Esports in the second round.

==== 2019 season ====
Finishing fifth in the OPL 2019 Split 1 regular season, Order entered playoffs with the lowest seed for playoffs and began in the first round against Mammoth. To the surprise of many analysts and fans, the Order went on a Cinderella run after defeating Mammoth, sweeping third-place Avant Gaming and second-place The Chiefs. However, Order's streak was ended by the Bombers in the finals, with the latter sweeping the former.

Order once again placed fifth in the regular season of Split 2 and, after defeating the Dire Wolves and the Bombers in the first and second rounds, respectively, they were eliminated from playoffs by a revamped Mammoth.

==== 2020 season ====
Order finished fourth in the OPL 2020 Split 1 regular season, qualifying for the lower bracket of playoffs (the playoffs format had been changed to a double elimination bracket prior to the start of the 2020 season). After eliminating Avant Gaming in the first round, Order was themselves eliminated by the Dire Wolves after a close series in the second round.

Improving from Split 1, Order finished second in Split 2 regular season, qualifying for the winners' bracket. After defeating Pentanet.GG in the first round, Order were knocked down to the lower bracket by Legacy Esports. Winning their subsequent match against The Chiefs in the third round, Order advanced to a rematch against Legacy Esports in the finals, which Order lost.

==== 2021 season ====
The League of Legends Circuit Oceania (LCO) replaced the OPL prior to the 2021 season, and Order was announced as one of its eight franchise teams.

Order placed fourth in the LCO 2021 Split 1 regular season and were promptly knocked out by The Chiefs in the first round of the lower bracket. Order fared better in Split 2, placing second in the regular season; however, they were knocked out of playoffs by Peace in the second round of the lower bracket after a close series.

==== 2022 season ====
For LCO 2022 Split 1, Order signed Brandon "BioPanther" Alexander, jungler Shane "Kevy" Allen, mid laner Ronald "Kisee" Vo, bot laner Nathan "Puma" Puma, and support Ian "Corporal" Pearse. Top laner Maximus "Maximize" Yaremenko moved to a substitute position.

Order placed fourth in the regular season and qualified for the first round of the lower bracket of playoffs. There, the team swept fifth-place Dire Wolves before sweeping second-place Peace in an upset result in the second round. Order defied the expectations of analysts and fans again by sweeping third-place Pentanet.GG in the third round and qualifying for the finals. After defeating The Chiefs in a close series, Order won its first domestic title and qualified for the 2022 Mid-Season Invitational. Order finished 7-8th in the event following a 0–8 record against Evil Geniuses and G2 Esports.

== Valorant ==
=== Formation ===
In July 2020, a group of five Australians formed the Free Agency team called "Team Launch". Team Launch would eventually go on to win the ORDER OCE Invitational, a tournament hosted by the organisation. After their impressive performance at the event ORDER would sign the team. The first iteration of ORDER was: Matthew "Texta" O’Rourke, Tyler "tucks" Reilly, Kale "Autumn" Dunne, Cameron "Disk0" Mac, Oliver "Dickstacy" Tierney.

== Honours ==
=== Valorant ===
Order Oce Invitational* (2020)

Chiefs Men Expert Invitational* (2020)

Valorant Challengers 5x (2021 split 1, 2021 split 2, 2021 championship, 2022 split 2, 2022 championship)

=== League of Legends ===
Oceania Champions 1x (Split 1 2022)

=== Counter-Strike: Global Offensive ===
WESG 2017 Asia Pacific Finals* (2017)

ESEA Division Australia 6x (Season 27, Season 30, Season 32, Season 33, Season 34, Season 36)

ESL Pro League -OCEANIA 1x (Season 8)

ESL ANZ Championship 3x (Season 8, Season 9, Season 12)

The Insanely Awesome CS:GO Tournament* (2022)

=== Overwatch ===
OCE Champions 2x (2019 Split 1, 2019 Split 2)

=== Player Unknown Battleground ===
OMEN by HP challenger series 2018* (2018)

=== Rocket League ===
Gfinity Australia Elite Series 1x (Season 1)

* one off event
