= Pentanet.GG =

Australian League of Legends team (2019–2023)

- Short name: PGG
- Game: League of Legends
- Founded: 2 December 2019
- Folded: 23 November 2023
- League: OPL (2020); LCO (since 2021)
- Based in: Perth, Australia
- Managing director: Stephen Cornish
- Head coach: Ryan Short
- General manager: Scott Farmer
- Championships: 1× LCO
- Parent group: Pentanet
- Website: pentanet.gg

Pentanet.GG was an Australian professional League of Legends team. It was founded on 2 December 2019, following the acquisition of the Bombers' Oceanic Pro League (OPL) spot by Perth-based internet provider Pentanet. After Riot Games discontinued the OPL following the 2020 season, Pentanet.GG became a member of the ESL-run League of Legends Circuit Oceania (LCO).

== History ==
Essendon Football Club announced on 2 December 2019 that it had sold its OPL spot to internet provider Pentanet. Pentanet simultaneously announced the founding of its new esports department, Pentanet.GG.

Pentanet.GG's inaugural roster consisted of top laner Brandon "BioPanther" Alexander, jungler Paris "Souli" Sitzoukis, mid laner Jarod "Getback" Tucker, bot laner Mark "Praedyth" Lewis, and support Jake "Rogue" Sharwood. The team finished sixth in Split 1 of the 2020 OPL season. Prior to Split 2, Pentanet.GG replaced "Souli" with Jackson "Pabu" Pavone, who had just announced his role swap from top to jungle. Pentanet.GG finished third in the regular season of Split 2 and qualified for playoffs. However, the team's playoff debut was short-lived. ORDER defeated Pentanet.GG 3–1 in the first round of the winners' bracket, knocking Pentanet.GG down to the second round of the losers' bracket. Pentanet.GG was then swept by The Chiefs and eliminated from playoff contention.

Riot Games announced in late 2020 that the OPL would be discontinued, prompting many OPL players to seek offers from overseas. "Rogue" subsequently left Pentanet.GG to join French team Izi Dream. He was replaced with OPL veteran Daniel "Decoy" Ealam. "Getback" was meanwhile replaced with another OPL veteran, Jesse "Chazz" Mahoney. The OPL's replacement, the LCO, was later announced by ESL in early 2021, with Pentanet.GG as one of its eight franchise members.

Pentanet.GG became the LCO's first champions after dominating Split 1 of the 2021 LCO season. The team finished first in the regular season with only one loss to Gravitas, and then won their first domestic title after winning three series in a row. This qualified Pentanet.GG for the 2021 Mid-Season Invitational as Oceania's representative.

For the first stage of the 2021 Mid-Season Invitational, Pentanet.GG was placed in Group A, along with China's Royal Never Give Up and Russia's Unicorns of Love. Vietnam's GAM Esports was also drawn into the group, but they were unable to participate in the event due to Vietnam's COVID-19 restrictions. Pentanet.GG finished the quadruple round robin with only two wins and six losses, tying Unicorns of Love for second. After defeating Unicorns of Love in the subsequent tiebreaker match, Pentanet.GG became the first Oceanic team to advance to the main event of an international League of Legends tournament. In the second stage of the tournament, Pentanet.GG only managed to win one game against North America's Cloud9, ending fifth to sixth overall.

In Split 2 of the 2021 LCO regular season, the team once again finished in first place with a 15–6 record. In the playoffs, Pentanet.GG beat Dire Wolves 3–0 before losing to PEACE 3–0 in the finals, ending the season in second place.

On 24 November 2023, Antic Esports acquired Pentanet.GG's LCO spot.

== Tournament results ==
Placement	Event	Final result (W–L)
6th	2020 OPL Split 1	7–14
3rd	2020 OPL Split 2	13–8
4th	2020 OPL Split 2 Playoffs	0–3 (against Chiefs Esports Club)
1st	2021 OPL Split 1	13–1
1st	2021 OPL Split 1 Playoffs	3–1 (against PEACE)
5th–6th	2021 Mid-Season Invitational	1–9 (main event)
1st	2021 OPL Split 2	15–6
2nd	2021 OPL Split 2 Playoffs	0–3 (against PEACE)
