= Peace (esports) =

Australian League of Legends team (2021–2023)

PEACE
- Game: League of Legends
- Founded: 16 February 2021
- Folded: 2023
- Location: Australia
- Owners: Edward Luo
- Head coach: Zhang "Colla" Hao
- General manager: Marco "shotzz" Mantarro

Peace (stylised in all caps) was an Australian professional League of Legends team competing in the League of Legends Circuit Oceania (LCO), the top-level league for the game in Oceania. The team qualified for the World Championship in its debut year after an upset victory over Pentanet.GG in the LCO 2021 Split 2 playoffs. PEACE was removed from the LCO in 2023, after its managers submitted the team's roster late.

== History ==
=== 2021 season ===
==== LCO 2021 ====
Peace was founded on 16 February 2021 by Edward Luo, following his acquisition of Avant Gaming's LCO spot. Avant Gaming had announced prior that it was merging with the Dire Wolves and selling its LCO spot. Peace's inaugural roster consisted of top laner Yao "Apii" Jianjing, jungler Thomas "LeeSA" Ma, mid laner James "Halo" Giacoumakis, bot laner Vincent "Violet" Wong, and support Ryan "Aladoric" Richardson. Bot laner Wang "Chayon" Yuncheng also joined Peace as a substitute player, and jungler Shane "Kevy" Allen later joined the team in the middle of the LCO 2021 Split 1.

Peace concluded their inaugural split, the LCO 2021 Split 1, with a strong finish. The team placed third in the regular season after losing a second place tiebreaker match to Dire Wolves, qualifying them for the winners' bracket of playoffs. Peace swept Dire Wolves in the first round before they were knocked down to the losers' bracket by Pentanet.GG after a close series. Peace then defeated The Chiefs in the losers' bracket to qualify for a rematch against Pentanet.GG in the finals. Peace was once again defeated by Pentanet.GG and finished runners-up in their inaugural split.

Peace signed several players to their roster in preparation for the LCO 2021 Split 2. Veteran players Leo "Babip" Romer and James "Tally" Shute were signed as the team's new starting jungler and mid laner, respectively. Support Junfu "Zingy" Jia also joined as a substitute player, while Kevy left Peace to join Order.

Peace had a slower start to the LCO 2021 Split 2 than Split 1, but the team was able to win their first domestic title in Split 2 nonetheless. For much of the regular season, Peace struggled to keep a consistent starting roster and many players role-swapped for different iterations. The team's substitute players Chayon and Zingy both saw time on-stage, top laner Apii and jungler LeeSA both played support for a few games, and at one point mid laner Tally had become the team's top laner. Owing to their constant roster changes, Peace finished fifth in the regular season and qualified for playoffs with the lowest seed in the losers' bracket. By the end of the regular season, Peace had committed to its original starting roster of Apii, Babip, Tally, Violet, and Aladoric. To many analysts' surprise, Peace made it through the entire losers' bracket to qualify for a rematch against Pentanet.GG in the finals. Peace defeated The Chiefs, Order, and Dire Wolves in the first, second, and third rounds of the losers' bracket, respectively. Despite most analysts predicting a Pentanet.GG victory, Peace surprised many by sweeping Pentanet.GG to claim their first LCO title and qualify for the 2021 World Championship (Worlds 2021).

==== Worlds 2021 ====
Shortly before Worlds 2021 was scheduled to begin, it was announced that Apii and LeeSA would not participate in the tournament due to visa issues. As Chinese citizens, both players had to apply for an Icelandic visa through the Chinese embassy in Australia, but the building was closed due to the COVID-19 pandemic in Australia. Peace's management considered having the two players return to China to get their Icelandic visas there, but the isolation period required afterwards would be longer than the duration of the tournament, and so the decision was made to find replacements for the pair instead. A week later, Peace announced that veteran LEC player Kiss "Vizicsacsi" Tamás would replace Apii, and that the team would go to Worlds 2021 with only one jungler.

For the play-in stage of Worlds 2021, Peace was placed in Group A, along with China's LNG Esports, South Korea's Hanwha Life Esports, Brazil's Red Canids, and Latin America's Infinity Esports. Peace finished third in their group and qualified for the knockout stage. Peace defeated Red Canids in a close series in the first round, but the team was swept by Cloud9 in the second, qualifying round.

=== 2022 season ===
Babip, Halo, Tally, Violet, and Aladoric all left Peace shortly after the conclusion of Worlds 2021.

In February 2022, Tally and Aladoric accused Peace of failing to pay several of its former players "tens of thousands" in bonuses and prize-pool cuts.
