= 2022 League of Legends World Championship =

12th competition of the League of Legends World Championship

Tournament information
- Game: League of Legends
- Location: Mexico; United States
- Dates: September 29–November 5
- Administrator: Riot Games
- Tournament formats: 12 team single round-robin play-in stage; 16 team double round-robin group stage; 8 team single-elimination bracket
- Venues: 4 (in 4 host cities): Mexico City (play-ins); New York (groups, quarterfinals); Atlanta (semifinals); San Francisco (finals)
- Teams: 24

Final positions
- Champion: DRX
- Runner-up: T1

Tournament statistics
- Attendance: 18,000 (Finals)
- MVP: Hwang "Kingen" Seong-hoon (DRX)
- Highest KDA: Zhuo "Knight" Ding (8.4) (JD Gaming)
- Highest Kills: Three players (12)

The 2022 League of Legends World Championship (Spanish: El Campeonato Mundial de League of Legends 2022) was an esports tournament for the multiplayer online battle arena video game League of Legends. It was the twelfth iteration of the League of Legends World Championship, an annual international tournament organized by the game's developer, Riot Games. The tournament was held from September 29 to November 5 in Mexico and the United States. It was the fourth edition of the World Championship to be held in the United States after the 2012, 2013, and 2016 editions, while this marked the first time Mexico hosted the tournament.

Twenty-four teams from 11 regions qualified for the tournament based on their placement in regional circuits such as those in China, Europe, North America, South Korea, Taiwan/Hong Kong/Macau/Southeast Asia and Vietnam, with twelve of those teams having to reach the main event via a play-in stage.

On August 29, Riot Games announced and revealed the new Summoner's Cup that would be awarded to the winner of the finals. "Star Walkin'" was announced as the tournament's theme song, performed by Lil Nas X.

DRX won the tournament after defeating T1 3–2 in a close final series. This was the first international title won by DRX, as well as the first by a play-in team. DRX's advance to the finals was widely described by commentators as a Cinderella run. DRX was considered an underdog team, having barely qualified for the tournament as South Korea's final seed, and having been pitted against a number of tournament favorites, including defending world champions Edward Gaming.

This is the last edition of Worlds to feature a round-robin play-in stage and group stage before switching to a GSL-style double-elimination bracket for the play-in stage and a Swiss stage main stage for the next edition of the tournament.

== Qualified teams and rosters ==
=== Qualified teams ===
China (LPL) and South Korea (LCK) received an additional spot, totaling up to four representatives each for their respective region.

Due to the ongoing Russian invasion of Ukraine, CIS (LCL) will not be able to send their representative this year, their slot will be given to the Europe (LEC) due to their strong performance over the past two years, making the LEC having four representatives for the region.

Top 4 regions in 2022 Mid-Season Invitational (LPL, LCK, LEC, LCS) are seeded to pool 1 in the main event's group stage for the summer champion.

Region	League	Qualification Path	Team	ID	Pool
Started from Group Stage
China	LPL	Summer Champion	JD Gaming	JDG	1
China	LPL	Most Championship Points	Top Esports	TES	2
China	LPL	Regional Finals Winner	Edward Gaming	EDG	3
South Korea	LCK	Summer Champion	Gen.G	GEN	1
South Korea	LCK	Most Championship Points	T1	T1	2
South Korea	LCK	Regional Finals Winner	DWG KIA	DK	3
Europe	LEC	Summer Champion	Rogue	RGE	1
Europe	LEC	Summer Runner-Up	G2 Esports	G2	2
North America	LCS	Championship Champion	Cloud9	C9	1
North America	LCS	Championship Runner-Up	100 Thieves	100	3
TW/HK/MO/SEA	PCS	Summer Champion	CTBC Flying Oyster	CFO	2
Vietnam	VCS	Summer Champion	GAM Esports	GAM	3
Started from Play-in Stage
China	LPL	Regional Finals Runner-Up	Royal Never Give Up	RNG	1
South Korea	LCK	Regional Finals Runner-Up	DRX	DRX	1
Europe	LEC	Summer Third Place	Fnatic	FNC	1
Europe	LEC	Summer Fourth Place	MAD Lions	MAD	2
North America	LCS	Championship Third Place	Evil Geniuses	EG	2
TW/HK/MO/SEA	PCS	Summer Runner-Up	Beyond Gaming	BYG	1
Vietnam	VCS	Summer Runner-Up	Saigon Buffalo	SGB	2
Brazil	CBLOL	Split 2 Champion	LOUD	LLL	3
Japan	LJL	Summer Champion	DetonatioN FocusMe	DFM	2
Latin America	LLA	Closing Champion	Isurus	ISG	3
Oceania	LCO	Split 2 Champion	Chiefs Esports Club	CHF	3
Turkey	TCL	Summer Champion	Istanbul Wildcats	IW	3

== Venues ==
Mexico City, New York City, Atlanta and San Francisco were the four cities chosen to host the tournament. Toronto formerly had been chosen to host the semifinals, but later Riot Games decided to host in Atlanta due to COVID-19 impacting the viability of securing multi-entry visas from Canada to the United States within necessary timelines.

Mexico City, Mexico	United States		
Mexico City, Mexico	New York City	Atlanta	San Francisco
Play-in Stage	Group Stage and Quarterfinals	Semifinals	Finals
Arena Esports Stadium	Hulu Theater	State Farm Arena	Chase Center
Capacity: 100	Capacity: 5,600	Capacity: 21,000	Capacity: 18,060
2022 League of Legends World Championship is located in Mexico	2022 League of Legends World Championship is located in the United States		

== Play-in stage ==
=== Play-in groups ===
The play-in groups took place from 29 September to 2 October. Twelve teams were drawn into two groups of six based on their seeding, with the restriction that two teams from the LEC could not be placed in the same group. The stage was played in a single round-robin format, with all matches contested as best-of-one. When teams finished with identical win–loss records, tie-breaker matches were held. In the case of a two-way tie, the result of the head-to-head game was not used to determine the winner; however, the team that had won the head-to-head match received side selection in the tiebreaker. The top team from each group automatically qualified for the main event, while the second- to fourth-placed teams advanced to the play-in knockouts, with the second-placed team receiving a bye to match 2. The bottom two teams were eliminated.

==== Group A ====
Pos	Team	Pld	W	L	PCT	Qualification
1	Fnatic	5	4	1	.800	Advance to group stage
2	Evil Geniuses	7	5	2	.714	Advance to play-in knockouts round 1
3	LOUD	6	3	3	.500	Advance to play-in knockouts round 2
4	DetonatioN FocusMe	6	3	3	.500	Advance to play-in knockouts round 2
5	Beyond Gaming	5	2	3	.400	
6	The Chiefs	5	0	5	.000	

Source: LoL Esports
Rules for classification: 1) Winning percentage; 2) Tiebreaker match(es); 3) Total game victory time (Note: The total amount of time it took a team to win their games against all other teams in the tiebreaker)

==== Group B ====
Pos	Team	Pld	W	L	PCT	Qualification
1	DRX	5	5	0	1.000	Advance to group stage
2	Royal Never Give Up	5	4	1	.800	Advance to play-in knockouts round 1
3	MAD Lions	5	3	2	.600	Advance to play-in knockouts round 2
4	Saigon Buffalo Esports	5	2	3	.400	Advance to play-in knockouts round 2
5	Isurus	5	1	4	.200	
6	DenizBank İstanbul Wildcats	5	0	5	.000	

Source: LoL Esports
Rules for classification: 1) Winning percentage; 2) Tiebreaker match(es); 3) Total game victory time

=== Play-in knockouts ===
The play-in knockouts were held from 3 to 4 October, using a king-of-the-hill format with two branches. The third-placed teams from the group stage faced the fourth-placed teams from the same group in the first match of each branch. The winners then played against the second-placed teams from the other group in the second match. All matches were single-elimination and contested as best-of-five series. The winners of the second match in each branch advanced to the main event group stage.

Round 1
A3	LOUD	1
A4	DetonatioN FocusMe	3
B3	MAD Lions	3
B4	Saigon Buffalo	1

Round 2
B2	Royal Never Give Up	3
A4	DetonatioN FocusMe	1
A2	Evil Geniuses	3
B3	MAD Lions	0

Source: LoL Esports

== Group stage ==
The main event group stage took place from 7 to 16 October. Sixteen teams were drawn into four groups of four based on their seeding, with teams from the same region generally not permitted to be placed in the same group. In the scenario where both the LEC 3rd and 4th seeded teams advanced to the group stage, the 4th-seeded team was exempt from the rule preventing a group from having more than one team from the same region. If either LEC team was eliminated during the play-in stage, the restriction remained in place. The stage was played in a double round-robin format, with all matches contested as best-of-one. When teams finished with identical win–loss and head-to-head records, tiebreaker matches were held to determine first or second place. In cases where more than two teams had the same record, tiebreaker placement was determined by the combined times of the teams’ victorious games. The top two teams from each group advanced to the knockout stage, while the bottom two were eliminated.

=== Group A ===
Pos	Team	Pld	W	L	PCT	Qualification
1	T1	6	5	1	.833	Advance to knockouts
2	Edward Gaming	6	4	2	.667	Advance to knockouts
3	Fnatic	6	2	4	.333	
4	Cloud9	6	1	5	.167	

Source: LoL Esports
Rules for classification: 1) Winning percentage; 2) Tiebreaker match(es); 3) Total game victory time

=== Group B ===
Pos	Team	Pld	W	L	PCT	Qualification
1	JD Gaming	7	6	1	.857	Advance to knockouts
2	DWG KIA	7	5	2	.714	Advance to knockouts
3	Evil Geniuses	6	1	5	.167	
4	G2 Esports	6	1	5	.167	

Source: LoL Esports
Rules for classification: 1) Winning percentage; 2) Tiebreaker match(es); 3) Total game victory time

=== Group C ===
Pos	Team	Pld	W	L	PCT	Qualification
1	DRX	7	5	2	.714	Advance to knockouts
2	Rogue	7	4	3	.571	Advance to knockouts
3	Top Esports	6	3	3	.500	
4	GAM Esports	6	1	5	.167	

Source: LoL Esports
Rules for classification: 1) Winning percentage; 2) Tiebreaker match(es); 3) Total game victory time

=== Group D ===
Pos	Team	Pld	W	L	PCT	Qualification
1	Gen.G	7	6	1	.857	Advance to knockouts
2	Royal Never Give Up	7	5	2	.714	Advance to knockouts
3	100 Thieves	6	1	5	.167	
4	CTBC Flying Oyster	6	1	5	.167	

Source: LoL Esports
Rules for classification: 1) Winning percentage; 2) Tiebreaker match(es); 3) Total game victory time

== Knockout stage ==
The main event knockout stage took place from 20 October to 5 November. Eight teams that advanced from the group stage were drawn into a single-elimination bracket. All matches were contested as best-of-five series. Each first-placed team from the group stage was matched against a second-placed team from a different group. The first-placed team selected the side for the first game, while the loser of each game chose the side for the following game. Teams that had advanced from the same group were placed on opposite sides of the bracket, ensuring that they could not meet until the final.

Quarterfinals
20 October, 14:00 PST – New York City
B1	JD Gaming	3
C2	Rogue	0
21 October, 14:00 PST – New York City
A1	T1	3
D2	Royal Never Give Up	0
22 October, 14:00 PST – New York City
D1	Gen.G	3
B2	DWG KIA	2
23 October, 14:00 PST – New York City
C1	DRX	3
A2	Edward Gaming	2

Semifinals
29 October, 14:00 PST – Atlanta
JD Gaming	1
T1	3
30 October, 14:00 PST – Atlanta
Gen.G	1
DRX	3

Final
5 November, 17:00 PST – San Francisco
T1	2
DRX	3

Source: LoL Esports

== Ranking ==
=== Team ranking ===
Place	Team	PG	PK1	PK2	GS	QF	SF	Finals	Prize (%)	Prize (USD)
1st	DRX (Note: Not including tie-break games.)	5–0	–	–	4–2	3–2	3–1	3–2	22%	$489,500
2nd	T1	–	–	–	5–1	3–0	3–1	2–3	15%	$333,750
3rd–4th	JD Gaming	–	–	–	5–1	3–0	1–3		8%	$178,000
3rd–4th	Gen.G	–	–	–	5–1	3–2	1–3		8%	$178,000
5th–8th	DWG KIA	–	–	–	5–1	2–3			4.5%	$100,125
5th–8th	Edward Gaming	–	–	–	4–2	2–3			4.5%	$100,125
5th–8th	Royal Never Give Up	4–1	–	3–1	5–1	0–3			4.5%	$100,125
5th–8th	Rogue	–	–	–	4–2	0–3			4.5%	$100,125
9th–10th	Top Esports	–	–	–	3–3				2.5%	$55,625
9th–10th	Fnatic	4–1	–	–	2–4				2.5%	$55,625
11th–14th	Evil Geniuses	3–2	–	3–0	1–5				2.375%	$52,843.75
11th–14th	100 Thieves	–	–	–	1–5				2.375%	$52,843.75
11th–14th	CTBC Flying Oyster	–	–	–	1–5				2.375%	$52,843.75
11th–14th	G2 Esports	–	–	–	1–5				2.375%	$52,843.75
15th–16th	Cloud9	–	–	–	1–5				2.25%	$50,062.50
15th–16th	GAM Esports	–	–	–	1–5				2.25%	$50,062.50
17th–18th	DetonatioN FocusMe	3–2	3–1	1–3					1.75%	$38,937.50
17th–18th	MAD Lions	3–2	3–1	0–3					1.75%	$38,937.50
19th–20th	LOUD	3–2	1–3						1.5%	$33,375
19th–20th	Saigon Buffalo	2–3	1–3						1.5%	$33,375
21st–22nd	Beyond Gaming	2–3							1%	$22,250
21st–22nd	Isurus	1–4							1%	$22,250
23rd–24th	Chiefs Esports Club	0–5							0.75%	$16,687.50
23rd–24th	Istanbul Wildcats	0–5							0.75%	$16,687.50
Place	Team	PG	PK1	PK2	GS	QF	SF	Finals	Prize (%)	Prize (USD)
