= Young Generation =

Young Generation may refer to:

- The Young Generation, a British singing and dancing group of the late 1960s and early 1970s
- Young Generation, a Vietnamese professional League of Legends team
