= Kanga Esports =

Australian esports organisation

- Founded: 30 January 2017
- Based in: Melbourne and Sydney
- Location: Australia
- Owners: Hayden "Haydz" Shiels; Brad "Gum" Da Silva
- General manager: Vash "Perzn" Memar
- Divisions: Marvel Rivals; Super Smash Bros. Ultimate
- Subsidiaries: Legacy
- Website: www.kangaesports.com

Kanga Esports is an Australian esports organisation based in Melbourne and Sydney. Founded in 2017 as a professional Paladins team, Kanga Esports saw international success in the competitive Paladins scene before branching out into other games. The organisation currently has teams competing in Marvel Rivals and Super Smash Bros. Ultimate.

== League of Legends ==
Kanga Esports acquired Legacy Esports and its LCO spot from the Adelaide Football Club on 21 November 2021. The LCO (short for League of Legends Circuit Oceania) is the top level of professional League of Legends in Oceania; Legacy Esports had been a long-time member of the LCO and its predecessor, the OPL (Oceanic Pro League). Legacy Esports qualified for the prestigious League of Legends World Championship in 2020, placing 17th to 18th out of 24 teams.

== Paladins ==
Professional Paladins player Hayden "Haydz" Shiels founded Kanga Esports in 2017. The team made several top finishes throughout its history and qualified for the Paladins World Championship in 2018, 2019, and 2020. Kanga Esports was a member of the Paladins Premier League.

=== Notable achievements ===
| Placement | Event |
|---|---|
| 3rd–4th | DreamHack Valencia 2017 |
| 3rd–4th | Paladin Masters Spring 2017 |
| 7th–8th | Paladins World Championship 2018 |
| 5th–8th | Paladins World Championship 2019 |
| 2nd | Paladins World Championship 2020 Placement Tournament |
| 5th–8th | Paladins World Championship 2020 |

== Fighting games ==
Kanga Esports sponsors Super Smash Bros. Ultimate player Jdizzle, who, as of November 2021, is ranked as Oceania's number one player.

Kanga Esports has also sponsored several of Oceania's top Brawlhalla players. Kylar Alice, who as of November 2021 is ranked as Oceania's number one player for both 1v1's and 2v2's, was previously sponsored by Kanga Esports. Kylar Alice's previous duo partner, Rite, and a current contender for number one, Doggo, are currently sponsored by Kanga Esports.

== Organisation ==
Kanga Esports previously had a training facility and gaming house in Atlanta, Georgia, United States.
