= Fenerbahçe Esports =

Turkish esports organization

- Nicknames: Sarı Lacivertliler (Yellow-Navy Blues); Vadinin Boğaları (Bulls of the Rift)
- Founded: 14 October 2016 (9 years, 362 days old)
- Based in: Istanbul, Turkey
- Colours: Yellow Navy
- President: Aziz Yıldırım
- Head coach: Emre "Arkhe" Akpınarlı
- Manager: Emre "nialya" Aksoy
- Partners: Maximum, Opet, NiMO TV, Axe, Omen, Fen Bilimleri Yayınları, Migros
- Parent group: Fenerbahçe S.K.
- Website: fenerbahceespor.com

Fenerbahçe Esports (Turkish: Fenerbahçe Espor) is the esports department of Turkish sports club Fenerbahçe S.K.. It was established in 2016. The department currently has teams competing in Age of Empires II: Definitive Edition, League of Legends, Valorant, FIFA, PlayerUnknown's Battlegrounds, Dota 2 and Apex Legends.

== History ==
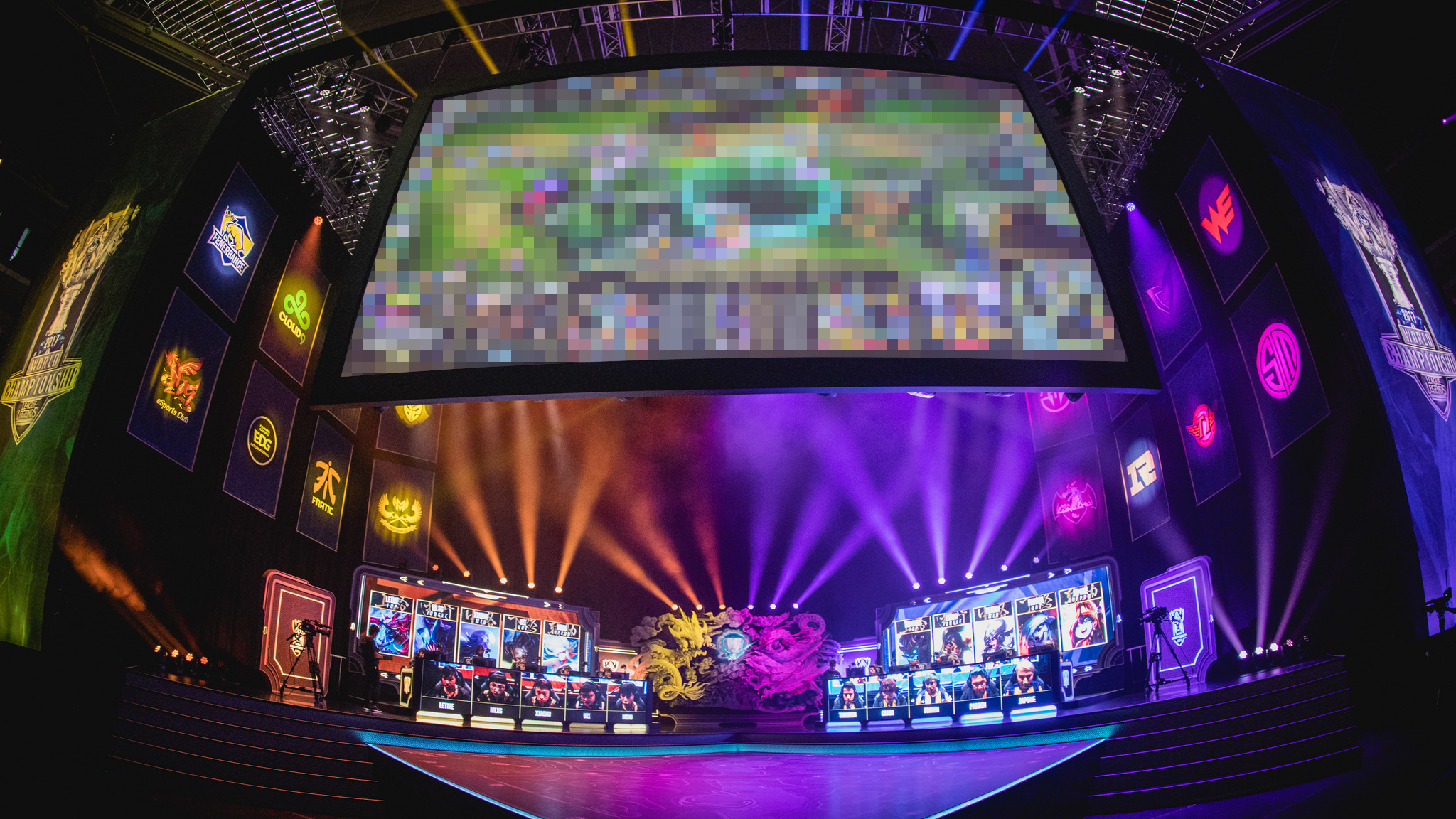
Group stage game at the Wuhan Sports Center Gymnasium during the 2017 League of Legends World Championship between Royal Never Give Up and Fenerbahçe

The team was established on 14 October 2016 when the 1907 Fenerbahçe Association, under the leadership of Ali Koç, took over all rights of the League of Legends team, SuperMassive eSpor in the Championship League. On November 23, Thaldrin became the first player to join the team and also took on the role of team captain. On November 24, coach Chris "MoSiTing" Würger joined the team. On December 10, 2016, it was announced that Reach, Frozen, Un1tback, J1mmy and JAPONE had joined the team. On January 8, 2017, Padden and Elysion joined as 2 marksmen. 1907 Fenerbahçe, which could not meet expectations during the winter season, beat HWA Gaming 3-2 in the semifinals, but lost 3-1 to SuperMassive in the semifinals and was eliminated in the semifinals. 1907 Fenerbahçe, who parted ways with Elysion, Un1tback and Reach in the summer, transferred Move. The team, which entered this season with momentum, finished the regular season in 1st place. Despite not being shown as the favorite in the final, they became champions by defeating SuperMassive 3-0 in the Turkish Grand Final played at Ülker Sports and Event Hall on August 19, 2017.

1907 Fenerbahçe, who parted ways with Move and signed Chaser in 2018, had a disappointing start to the season and finished the regular season in third place, performing well below the level of the previous year. They fell short of expectations by losing 3–1 to Team Aurora in the quarter-finals of the play-offs. The team re-signed Move in the summer but delivered a similar performance to the winter season, again finishing the league in third place. Although they defeated Bursaspor Esports 3–1 in the play-offs, they were eliminated in the semi-finals after a 3–1 loss to SuperMassive.

The management, who made radical decisions in 2019, parted ways with all of their players except Only35 and rebuilt the squad. They transferred Ruin, the former top laner of Giants Gaming, to the top lane, Kirei, who was the jungler of Dark Passage last season, to the jungler position, Bolulu, who was part of the Red Bull Factions 2018 champion Team Forge, to the mid lane, Hades, who played for Bursaspor Esports last season, and Japone, with whom they won the Summer Split championship. They finished the season in first place with 14 consecutive wins, and became champions by defeating SuperMassive 3-0 in the season finale. The team had the worst season in its history in the summer, finishing the first 9 weeks of the league in 2nd place with 7 wins and 2 losses, but finished the league in 6th place with 9 wins and 9 losses.

After sweeping SuperMassive 3–0 in the 2019 League of Legends TCL Winter finals, Fenerbahçe qualified for the 2019 Mid-Season Invitational as Turkey's representative in the play-in stage. The team was placed in Group A of the first round of the 2019 Mid-Season Invitational play-in stage, along with Vietnamese team Phong Vũ Buffalo, Australian team Bombers, and Argentine team Isurus Gaming. Fenerbahçe ended the group round robin with a 4–2 record, tying Phong Vũ Buffalo for 1st and forcing a tiebreaker match, which Fenerbahçe lost.

== Roster ==
=== NBA2K ===
Team
Country	Nick	Name	Position
Turkey	Tansu28	Tansu Aksoy	Small Forward
Turkey	Lovebattledead	Birkan Cengir	Power Forward
Turkey	IE9RENI	Eren Demirtaş	Playmaker
Turkey	Kado	Kadir Pektaş	Center
Turkey	Sabri_2k	Sabri Can Aksoy	Substitute
Turkey	Ates	Ates Peşkersoy	Substitute

=== FIFA ===
Team
Country	Nick	Name
Turkey	Mert1güven	Mert Güven
Turkey	Xeons	Ali Eren Yağız
Turkey	Sarpinho7	Sarp Sina Kaya
Turkey	Slippyzerg	Eren Aktürk

=== Apex Legends ===
Team
Country	Nick	Name
Turkey	Pinkfinkytinky	Umut Zeytünlü
Turkey	Ldraconian	Alperen Özsoy
Turkey	Cathryan	Gökhan Saral

=== Valorant ===
Team
Country	Nick	Name	Role
Turkey	Burzzy	Burak Özveren	
Turkey	Mykoz	Mert Demirci	
Turkey	Shalz	Serkan Erdoğan	
Turkey	Elite	Efe Teber	
Turkey	Wasp	Fırat Mahir Kovan	
Turkey	Gloomy	Can Mercan Özalp	
Turkey	Soyer	Burak Soyer	
Turkey	Theia	Yusuf Kahraman	
Turkey	Omit	Ümit Boz	Team Coach
Turkey	Epic	Arda Yıldız	Team Coach

=== PUBG Mobile ===
Team
Country	Nick	Name	Role
Turkey	Bochika	Cengizhan Kasımay	
Turkey	Touch	Bünyamin Mert Caba	
Turkey	Rebelion	Emirkan Aşçıoğlu	
Turkey	Falky	Muhammed Ali Zai	
Turkey	Mystery	Gizem Çoban	
Turkey	Kleia	Ceren Türk	
Turkey	Kiara	Kevser Nur	
Turkey	Chell	Beyza Çulgutay	
Turkey	Leslie	Esra Demir	
Turkey	Antodalt	Can Serhat Gecebakan	Team Coach

== Achievements ==
=== League of Legends ===
- Championship League - Summer Season
  - Champion (1): 2017
  - Runner-up (1): 2022
- Championship League - Winter Season
  - Champion (2): 2019, 2020
  - Runner-up (1): 2021
- Academy League - Winter Season
  - Champion (2): 2019, 2022
- Academy League - Summer Season
  - Runner-up (1): 2019
- Rift rivals
  - Champion (1): 2017

=== EA Sports FC 24 Türk Telekom eSuper Cup ===
  - Champion (1): 2024

=== ASUS Wolfteam ===
- Champion (3): 2018, 2019, 2020

=== NBA2K ===
- Bounce League
  - Champion (1): 2023

== Teams and Rosters ==
=== Valorant ===
As of 2025, the Valorant roster includes:

Player	Real Name
ibonata	İbrahim Taha Güler
Best	Bartu Keskin
KROSTALY	Okan Alaçam
Slaughter	İrfancan Çakıl
exe	Cantuğ Hacıgeldi
Yigox	Yiğit Arslan

Coaching staff:

- zGGr (Özgür Şentürk)
- Haul (Arda Özgül)

=== PUBG Mobile ===
Notable addition in 2023: Mehmet Akif "RayZ" Kastal joined the PUBG Mobile team to strengthen the lineup.

== Achievements ==
Fenerbahçe Esports has been an active competitor in Turkish and international esports tournaments, including the Valorant Champions Tour (VCL) and other leagues, regularly reaching playoff stages.
