= Vega Squadron =

Russian esports organization

- Divisions: FIFA; League of Legends
- Founded: 10 July 2012
- Based in: Moscow
- Location: Russia
- CEO: Alexey "Vega" Kondakov
- Manager: Anton "Tunes" Boyko
- General manager: Vanja "HighArT" Šimunec
- Parent group: Vega LLC

Vega Squadron is a Russian professional esports organization based in Moscow. It was originally formed as a StarCraft II team on 10 July 2012. Currently, the organization has players competing in Counter-Strike: Global Offensive, Dota 2, FIFA, and League of Legends.

Vega Squadron's CS:GO team has participated in multiple majors, and its League of Legends team competes in the League of Legends Continental League (LCL), the highest level of professional League of Legends in the Commonwealth of Independent States.

== League of Legends ==
=== History ===
Vega Squadron entered the professional League of Legends scene on 15 December 2015 with its acquisition of the roster of Carpe Diem. The team's first main roster consisted of top laner Alexandr "NoNholy" Ovchinnikov, jungler Nikolay "Zanzarah" Akatov, mid laner Evgeniy "Drobovik123" Belousov, bot laner Igor "Tauren" Titov, and support Roman "Wildheart" Maximchyuk. The majority of the roster remained the same for six LCL splits, with player changes only in the bot lane, most notably the acquisition of EU LCS veteran Edward "Edward" Abgaryan, who had previously played for Gambit Gaming and Moscow Five.

On 1 January 2019, Vega Squadron announced a completely revised main roster consisting of top laner Vladislav "BOSS" Fomin, jungler Kirill "AHaHaCiK" Skvortsov, mid laner Lev "Nomanz" Yakshin, bot laner Ilya "Gadget" Makavchuk, and support Aleksandr "SaNTaS" Lifashin. The team finished 3rd in the regular season of the 2019 LCL Spring Split and qualified for playoffs, where they defeated Gambit Esports 3–0 in the semifinals and Elements Pro Gaming 3–1 in the finals to qualify for the 2019 Mid-Season Invitational as the LCL's representative.

Vega Squadron was placed in Group B of the first round of the 2019 Mid-Season Invitational play-in stage, along with Japanese team DetonatioN FocusMe, Brazilian team INTZ e-Sports, and Thai team MEGA Esports. The team ended the group round robin with a record of 5 wins and 1 loss, placing 1st in Group B and qualifying for the second round of the play-in stage, where they lost 1–3 to Flash Wolves. This result forced Vega Squadron to play in a third round against Phong Vũ Buffalo, who they narrowly lost to 2–3 in a close series, eliminating them from the event.

On 8 May 2020, Riot Games Russia temporarily banned four players of the team from competing in the LCL due to an incident where the players spoke in team chat about the possibility of match fixing. The ban lasted until July 2020.

=== Roster ===
Vega Squadron League of Legends roster
Players
Coaches

Role	Handle	Name	Nationality
Top	Ques	Generalov, Roman	Russia
Jungle	TsarCanya	Sinyakov, Alexander	Latvia
Mid	Articuna	Virvičs, Valentīns	Russia
Mid	The Cemen	Blyzniuk, Yuri	Ukraine
Bot	Laatch	Melin, Felix	Sweden
Support	Tristesse	Nazarov, Kirill	Russia

Head coach

Viktor "VTorNic" Koloda

Legend:
- (I) Inactive
- (S) Suspended
- Substitute
- (injured) Injury / Illness

Roster updated 4 February 2022.

== FIFA ==
Vega Squadron signed FIFA 18 player Michael "Torres" Zaporozhets on 13 January 2018.
