= 2019 Mid-Season Invitational =

League of Legends tournament

Tournament information
- Sport: League of Legends
- Location: Vietnam; Taiwan
- Dates: 1 May–19 May 2019
- Administrator: Riot Games
- Venue: Show list: Play-in Stage VCS Studio (Ho Chi Minh City); Main event Group stage National Convention Center (Hanoi); Main event Playoffs Taipei Heping Basketball Gymnasium (Taipei)
- Teams: 13

Final positions
- Champions: G2 Esports
- Runner-up: Team Liquid
- MVP: Rasmus "Caps" Winther (G2 Esports)

The 2019 Mid-Season Invitational was the fifth Mid-Season Invitational (MSI), a Riot Games-organised tournament for League of Legends, the multiplayer online battle arena video game. The tournament was the culmination of the 2019 Spring Split, the first part of season 9 of the game's competitive scene.

Each of the 13 premier League of Legends leagues sent a team to represent them; Europe (LEC), South Korea (LCK) and China (LPL) had their teams automatically admitted into the main event whereas the other 10 leagues competed among each other in the Play-in Stage, with the top three teams advancing to join the main event Group Stage.

"Bring Home The Glory" was the tournament's theme song, put together by Sara Skinner.

The tournament was hosted in Vietnam and Taiwan from 1 to 19 May 2019. Matches of the play-in were held in the VCS Studio in Ho Chi Minh City, matches of the group stage were held in the Vietnam National Convention Center in Hanoi, and playoffs took place in the Taipei Heping Basketball Gymnasium in Taipei.

G2 Esports from Europe defeated Team Liquid from North America 3–0 in the final and brought the region its first MSI championship.

== Qualified teams ==
The total number of participating regions decreased in 2019, from 14 last year to 13, due to the merger of two professional leagues, the North (LLN) and the South (CLS) of Latin America into a single league (LLA). The format was based on the 2017 Mid-Season Invitational.

Because of the Regional success in MSI and the World Championship in the two years prior (2017 and 2018), three teams from Europe (LEC), South Korea (LCK), and China (LPL) began in the main Group stage; two teams from North America (LCS) and Taiwan/Hong Kong/Macau (LMS) begin in the second round of the play-in stage; and the eight remaining teams begin in the first round of the play-in stage. Losing teams in the second round will play in a third final main group stage qualifying round.

Region	League	Teams	ID
Start from Main event's Group stage
China	LPL	Invictus Gaming	IG
Europe	LEC	G2 Esports	G2
South Korea	LCK	SK Telecom T1	SKT
Start from Play-in stage round 2
North America	LCS	Team Liquid	TL
TW/HK/MO	LMS	Flash Wolves	FW
Start from Play-in stage round 1
Vietnam	VCS	Phong Vũ Buffalo	PVB
Brazil	CBLOL	INTZ e-Sports	ITZ
CIS	LCL	Vega Squadron	VEG
Japan	LJL	DetonatioN FocusMe	DFM
Latin America	LLA	Isurus Gaming	ISG
Oceania	OPL	Bombers	BMR
Southeast Asia	LST	MEGA Esports	MG
Turkey	TCL	1907 Fenerbahçe	FB

== Venues ==
Ho Chi Minh City, Hanoi, Taipei were the three cities chosen to host the tournament.

Vietnam		Taipei, Taiwan
Ho Chi Minh City	Hanoi	Taipei, Taiwan
Play-in Stage	Group Stage	Play-off Stage
VCS Studio (GG Stadium)	National Convention Center	Heping Basketball Gymnasium
Capacity: 120	Capacity: 3,700	Capacity: 6,958
2019 Mid-Season Invitational is located in Vietnam		2019 Mid-Season Invitational is located in Taiwan

== Play-in stage ==
=== Groups ===
Only two teams of each pool is drawn into a group. Double Round Robin. First place teams from each group advance to Round 2.

Group A

Pos	Team	Pld	W	L	PCT	Qualification
1	Phong Vũ Buffalo	7	5	2	0.714	Advance to Play-In Knockouts
2	1907 Fenerbahçe	7	4	3	0.571	
3	Bombers	6	2	4	0.333	
4	Isurus Gaming	6	2	4	0.333	

Source: Rock Paper Shotgun

Group B

Pos	Team	Pld	W	L	PCT	Qualification
1	Vega Squadron	6	5	1	0.833	Advance to Play-In Knockouts
2	DetonatioN FocusMe	6	4	2	0.667	
3	MEGA Esports	6	2	4	0.333	
4	INTZ eSports	6	1	5	0.167	

Source: Rock Paper Shotgun

=== Knockouts ===
Team Liquid plays against Group A 1st-place. Flash Wolves plays against Group B 1st-place. Winners of the series advance to Group stage. Losers will be dropped to Round 3.

Winner of the series advances to Group stage. Loser is eliminated.

VCS of Vietnam gets directly spot in Main Group Stage for Summer Split winner and additional spot in Play-in Stage at 2019 League of Legends World Championship.

Round 2
Winner to Group Stage
Team Liquid	3
A1	Phong Vũ Buffalo	0
Winner to Group Stage
Flash Wolves	3
B1	Vega Squadron	1

Round 3
Winner to Group Stage
Phong Vũ Buffalo	3
Vega Squadron	2

Source: Rock Paper Shotgun

== Group stage ==
Double Round Robin. Top 4 teams advance to the knock-out stage. Bottom 2 teams are eliminated.

Pos	Team	Pld	W	L	PCT	Qualification
1	Invictus Gaming	10	9	1	0.900	Advance to Knockout Stage
2	SK Telecom T1	10	7	3	0.700	Advance to Knockout Stage
3	G2 Esports	10	5	5	0.500	Advance to Knockout Stage
4	Team Liquid	10	4	6	0.400	Advance to Knockout Stage
5	Flash Wolves	10	3	7	0.300	
6	Phong Vũ Buffalo	10	2	8	0.200	

Source: Rock Paper Shotgun

== Knockout stage ==
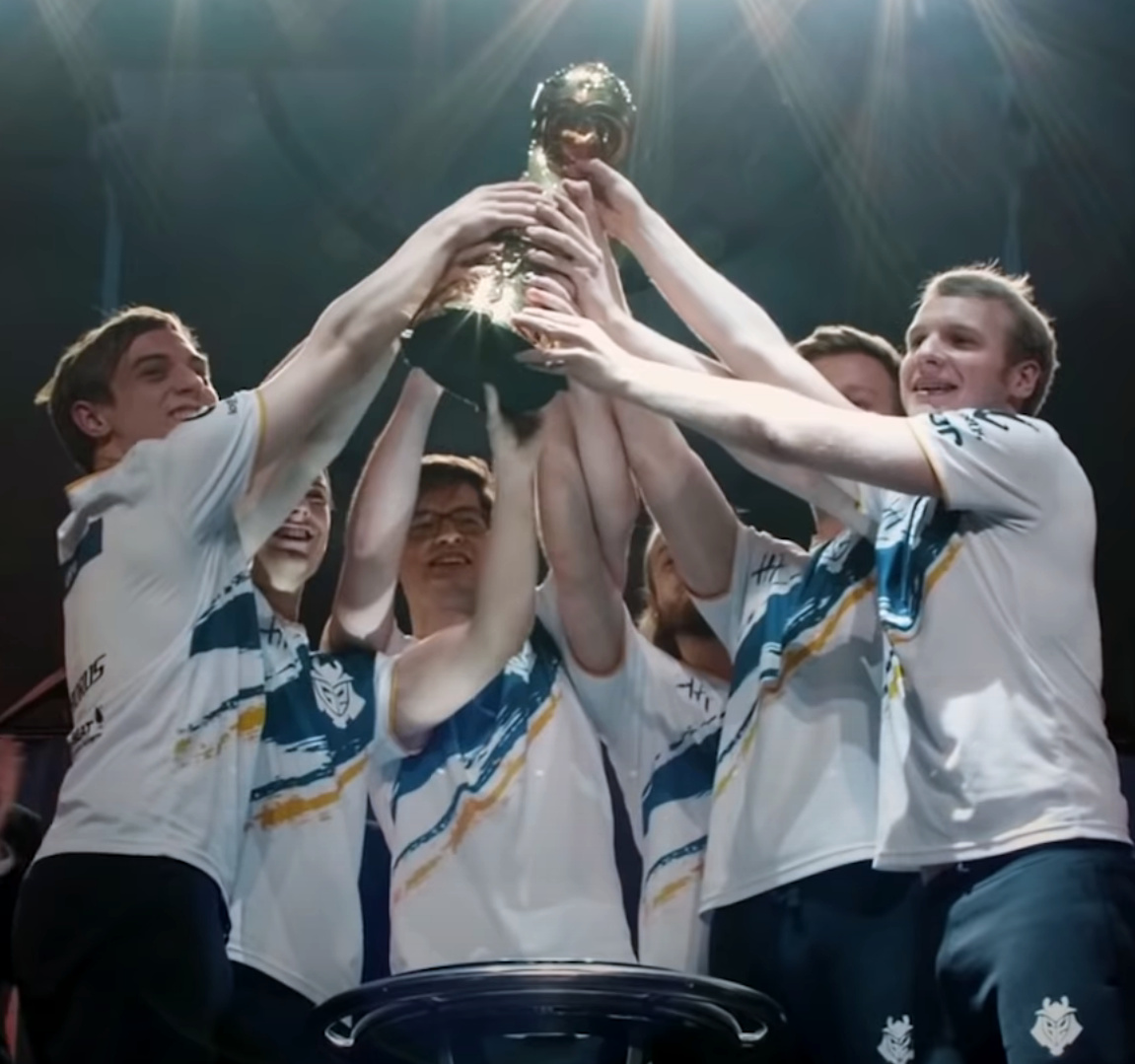
G2 Esports holding the MSI trophy

- 1st place team of Group Stage chooses between 3rd and 4th place to be their semifinal opponent (IG chose TL).
- Single elimination, matches are best-of-five

Semifinals
1	Invictus Gaming	1
4	Team Liquid	3
2	SK Telecom T1	2
3	G2 Esports	3

Final
Team Liquid	0
G2 Esports	3

Source: Rock Paper Shotgun

=== Semifinals ===
Semifinals	May 17	Invictus Gaming	1	–	3	Team Liquid	Taipei, Taiwan
	11:00 UTC	Source					Taipei Heping Basketball Gymnasium
		0	Game 1			1	
		0	Game 2			1	
		1	Game 3			0	
		0	Game 4			1	

Semifinals	May 18	SK Telecom T1	2	–	3	G2 Esports	Taipei, Taiwan
	08:00 UTC	Source					Taipei Heping Basketball Gymnasium
		1	Game 1			0	
		0	Game 2			1	
		1	Game 3			0	
		0	Game 4			1	
		0	Game 5			1	

=== Finals ===
Final	May 19	Team Liquid	0	–	3	G2 Esports	Taipei, Taiwan
	08:00 UTC	Source					Taipei Heping Basketball Gymnasium
		0	Game 1			1	
		0	Game 2			1	
		0	Game 3			1	

== Ranking ==
(*) Not including tie-break games.

Place	League	Teams	PS1	PS2	PS3	GS	SF	Final
1st	LEC	G2 Esports				5–5	3–2	3–0
2nd	LCS	Team Liquid		3–0		4–6	3–1	0–3
3rd–4th	LCK	SK Telecom T1				7–3	2–3	
3rd–4th	LPL	Invictus Gaming				9–1	1–3	
5th	LMS	Flash Wolves		3–1		3–7		
6th	VCS	Phong Vũ Buffalo*	4–2	0–3	3–2	2–8		
7th	LCL	Vega Squadron	5–1	1–3	2–3			
8th–9th	LJL	DetonatioN FocusMe	4–2					
8th–9th	TCL	1907 Fenerbahçe*	4–2					
10th–12th	LLA	Isurus Gaming	2–4					
10th–12th	OPL	Bombers	2–4					
10th–12th	LST	MEGA Esports	2–4					
13th	CBLOL	INTZ e-Sports	1–5					
