= League of Legends Continental League =

Professional esports league in the Commonwealth of Independent States

- Game: League of Legends
- Founder: Riot Games Russia
- First season: 2016
- Folded: 2022
- Owner: Riot Games Russia
- No. of teams: 8
- Continents: CIS
- Last champion: Unicorns of Love (3rd title)
- Most titles: Gambit Esports; Unicorns of Love (3 titles each)
- Broadcaster: Twitch
- Sponsor: Riot Games
- Domestic cup: LCL Open Cup
- Related competitions: League of Legends European Championship
- Website: ru.lolesports.com

The League of Legends Continental League (LCL; Russian: Континентальная лига по League of Legends, romanized: Kontinental'naya liga po League of Legends) was the top level of professional League of Legends competition in the Commonwealth of Independent States, organized by Riot Games Russia in 2016–2022. It replaced the SLTV StarSeries that was organized by StarLadder in 2016. There are eight teams in the league. Each annual season of play is divided into two splits, spring and summer, both consisting of five weeks of double round-robin tournament play, which then conclude with a play-off single elimination tournament between the top four teams. The winners of each split qualifies for the Mid-Season Invitational and the World Championship.

Prize pool of the competition in 2016 and 2017 amounts ₽4,5 million per season.

Due to the ongoing 2022 Russian invasion of Ukraine, the LCL's Spring 2022 season was cancelled, with no Summer 2022 or any 2023 or 2024 season played. When the LCL comes back, it may become an EMEA Regional League (ERL) that sends its top teams to EMEA Masters, since the CIS region was consolidated, alongside Europe, Turkey and MENA, into a single EMEA region in 2023.

== Results ==
=== As SLTV StarSeries ===
Year	Split	Champion	Runner-up	Third place	
2014	Season 1	Carpe Diem	Dragon Team	Revival Dragons	Good Team Multigaming
2014	Season 2	Hard Random	Virtus.pro	RoX	Internationally V
2014	Season 3	Dolphins of Wall Street	Hard Random	RoX	Moscow Five
2014	Season 4	RoX	Moscow Five	Virtus.pro	Team Just
2015	Spring	Hard Random	Moscow Five	Virtus.pro	Glacial Phoenix
2015	Summer	Hard Random	Dolphins of Wall Street	RoX	Carpe Diem

=== As LCL ===
Year	Split	Champion	Runner-up	Semifinalists	
2016	Spring	Hard Random	Team Empire	Vega Squadron	Natus Vincere
2016	Summer	Albus NoX Luna	Vega Squadron	RoX	Natus Vincere
2017	Spring	Virtus.pro	Vaevictis Esports	Vega Squadron	M19
2017	Summer	Gambit Esports	M19	Virtus.pro	Team Just Alpha
2018	Spring	Gambit Esports	RoX	Team Just (3rd place)	M19 (4th place)
2018	Summer	Gambit Esports	Dragon Army	Team Just	M19
2019	Spring	Vega Squadron	Elements Pro Gaming	Gambit Esports	M19
2019	Summer	Unicorns of Love	Vega Squadron	Gambit Esports	Elements Pro Gaming
2020	Spring	Unicorns of Love	RoX	Gambit Esports	Elements Pro Gaming
2020	Summer	Unicorns of Love	Gambit Esports	One Breath Gaming	CrowCrowd
2021	Spring	Unicorns of Love	CrowCrowd	Gambit Esports	One Breath Gaming
2021	Summer	Unicorns of Love	CrowCrowd	One Breath Gaming (3rd place)	Vega Squadron (4th place)
2022	Cancelled due to the ongoing 2022 Russian invasion of Ukraine				

== See also ==
- League of Legends Championship Series, equivalent competition in North America
- League of Legends European Championship, equivalent competition in Europe
