= 2022 Mid-Season Invitational =

League of Legends esports tournament

Tournament information
- Sport: League of Legends
- Location: Busan, South Korea
- Dates: 10 May–29 May
- Administrator: Riot Games
- Venue(s): Busan Esports Arena (group stage); Busan Exhibition and Convention Center (Rumble stage and Knockout stage)
- Teams: 11

Final positions
- Champions: Royal Never Give Up
- Runner-up: T1
- MVP: Yan "Wei" Yangwei (Royal Never Give Up)

The 2022 Mid-Season Invitational was the seventh Mid-Season Invitational (MSI), a Riot Games–organised tournament for League of Legends, a multiplayer online battle arena video game. The tournament was the culmination of the 2022 Spring Split and the first interregional competition of Season 12.

11 of the 12 premier League of Legends leagues had a team representing them; the LCL was not participating due to the Spring Split being cancelled as a result of the Russian invasion of Ukraine. The competition continued the same format that was introduced during MSI 2021. The minimum prize pool was US$250,000.

"Set It Off" was the tournament's theme song, put together by DPR Live, and DPR Cline.

The tournament was hosted in Busan, South Korea, from 10 to 29 May 2022. The Group Stage was held in the Busan Esports Arena, while the Rumble Stage and Knockout Stage was held in the Busan Exhibition and Convention Center (BEXCO) Exhibition Hall 1 in Busan. Due to COVID-19 pandemic in mainland China, the qualified team from LPL competed remotely from China, in the team's training facility.

Defending champion Royal Never Give Up from China defeated T1 from South Korea 3–2 in the final, winning their third MSI title.

== Format ==
Teams from 11 regions competed in the Group Stage, the Rumble Stage, and the Knockout Stage, similar to the format used in the 2021 Mid-Season Invitational.

=== Group stage ===
All teams were drawn into three groups, with two of the groups having four teams and one group with three teams. All matches was a best-of-one double round robin.

=== Rumble Stage ===
The top two teams from each group competed in the Rumble Stage. The matches was a best-of-one double round robin.

=== Knockout stage ===
The top four teams advanced to the Knockout Stage. The matches was a best-of-one single elimination.

== Qualified teams ==
Due to the ongoing Russian invasion of Ukraine, the LCL Spring Split had been cancelled, and the CIS region therefore could not participate in the tournament.

Region	League	Teams	ID	Pool
China	LPL	Royal Never Give Up	RNG	1
Europe	LEC	G2 Esports	G2	1
South Korea	LCK	T1	T1	1
North America	LCS	Evil Geniuses	EG	2
TW/HK/MO/SEA	PCS	PSG Talon	PSG	2
Vietnam	VCS	Saigon Buffalo (Note: The VCS Spring 2022 Champions GAM Esports decided not to participate in this MSI due to their participation in the 2021 Southeast Asian Games as the Vietnam National Team. Saigon Buffalo are invited to MSI as the runners-up.)	SGB	2
Latin America	LLA	Team Aze	AZE	3
Turkey	TCL	Istanbul Wildcats	IW	3
Brazil	CBLOL	RED Canids	RED	4
Japan	LJL	DetonatioN FocusMe	DFM	4
Oceania	LCO	ORDER	ORD	4

== Venue ==
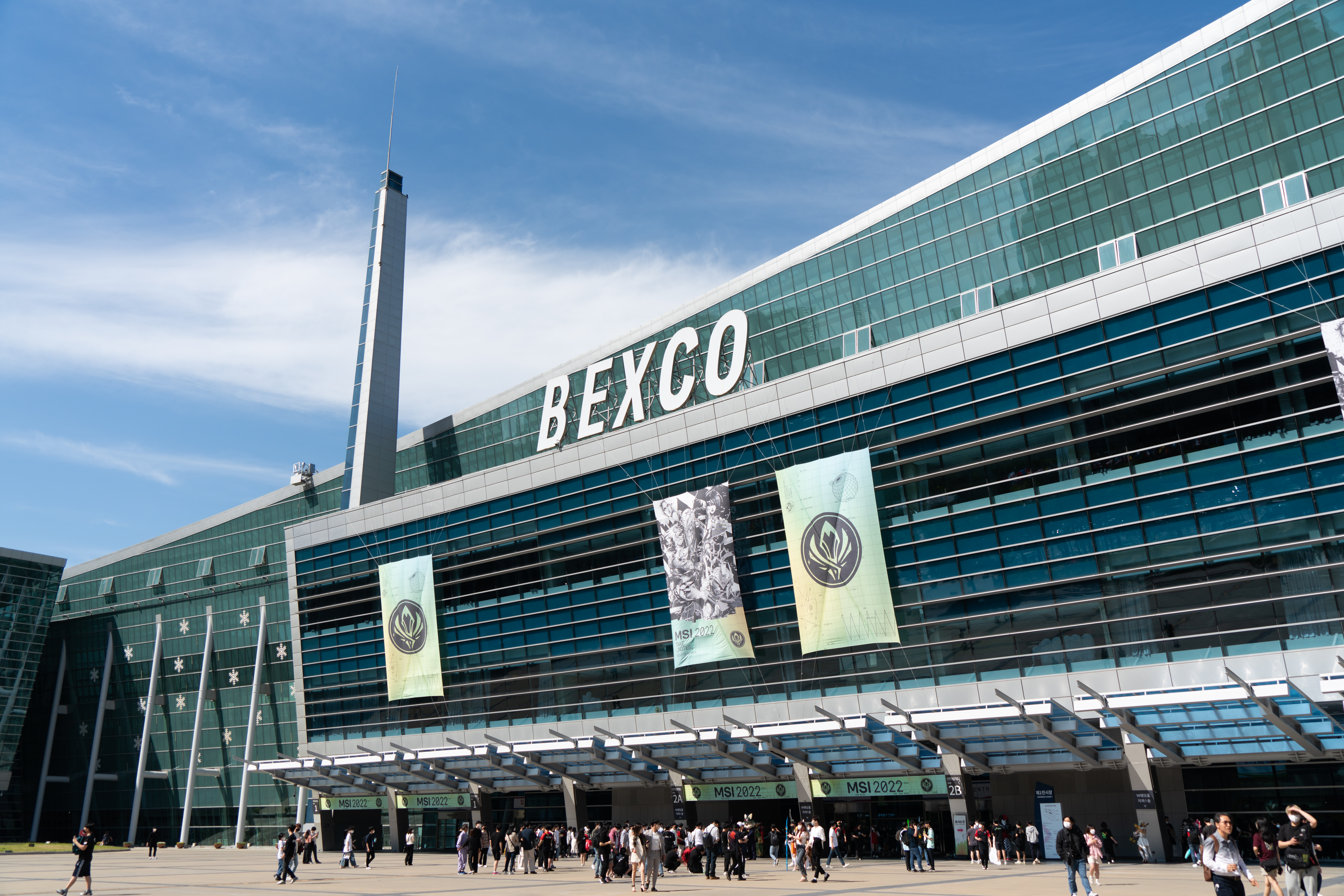
BEXCO for the 2022 MSI

Busan was the city chosen to host the competition. The Group Stage was held at the Busan Esports Arena, while the Rumble Stage and Knockout Stage was held at the BEXCO.

Busan, South Korea
Group Stage	Rumble and Knockout Stage
Busan Esports Arena	BEXCO
2022 Mid-Season Invitational is located in South Korea

== Group stage ==
- Date and time: 10–15 May, began at 17:00 KST (08:00 UTC)
- Eleven teams were drawn into three groups, two groups of four and one group of three
- Double round robin for Groups A and B, quadruple round robin for Group C; all matches were best-of-one
- If two teams had the same win–loss record and head-to-head record, then a tiebreaker match would have been played
- Top two teams advanced to the Rumble Stage; bottom two teams were eliminated

Group A

Pos	Team	Pld	W	L	PCT	Qualification
1	T1	6	6	0	1.000	Advance to Rumble stage
2	Saigon Buffalo Esports	6	4	2	0.667	Advance to Rumble stage
3	Team Aze	6	1	5	0.167	
4	DetonatioN FocusMe	6	1	5	0.167	

Source: LoL Esports

Group B

Pos	Team	Pld	W	L	PCT	Qualification
1	Royal Never Give Up	6	6	0	1.000	Advance to Rumble stage
2	PSG Talon	6	3	3	0.500	Advance to Rumble stage
3	RED Canids	6	2	4	0.333	
4	Istanbul Wildcats	6	1	5	0.167	

Source: LoL Esports

Group C

Pos	Team	Pld	W	L	PCT	Qualification
1	G2 Esports	8	8	0	1.000	Advance to Rumble stage
2	Evil Geniuses	8	4	4	0.500	Advance to Rumble stage
3	ORDER	8	0	8	0.000	

Source: LoL Esports

== Rumble stage ==
- Date and time: 20–24 May, begins at 15:00 KST (06:00 UTC)
- Six teams played in a double round robin; matches were best-of-one
- If teams had the same win–loss record and head-to-head record, then tiebreaker matches would have been played for first, second, and fourth place
- Top four teams advanced to the Knockout Stage; bottom two teams were eliminated

Pos	Team	Pld	W	L	PCT	Qualification
1	Royal Never Give Up	10	8	2	0.800	Advance to knockout stage
2	T1	10	7	3	0.700	Advance to knockout stage
3	G2 Esports	10	5	5	0.500	Advance to knockout stage
4	Evil Geniuses	10	5	5	0.500	Advance to knockout stage
5	PSG Talon	10	3	7	0.300	
6	Saigon Buffalo Esports	10	2	8	0.200	

Source: LoL Esports

== Knockout stage ==
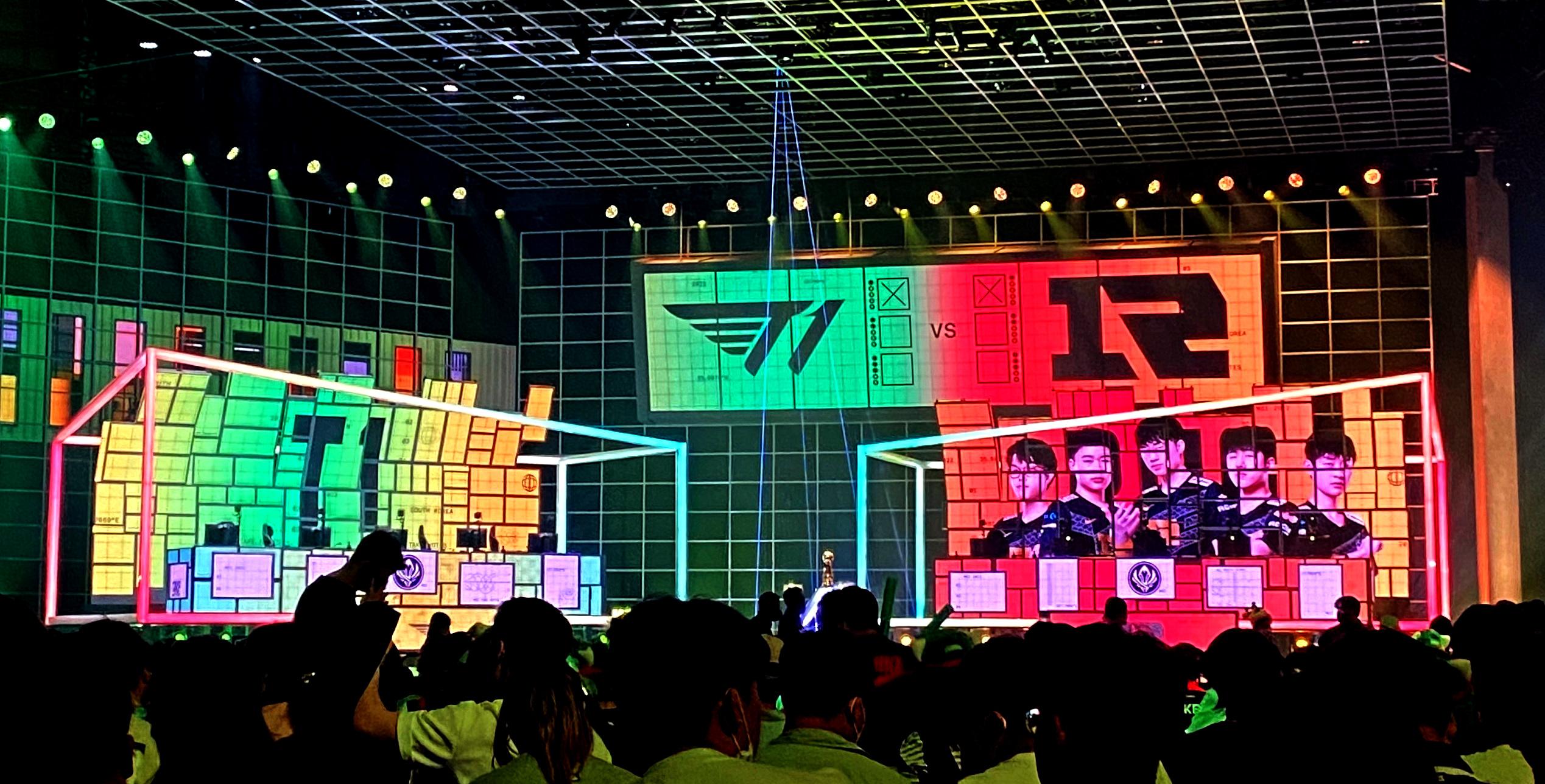
T1 vs RNG in the finals

- Date and time: 27–29 May, 17:00 KST (08:00 UTC)
- Single elimination, matches are best-of-five
- Top team from the Rumble Stage chose between 3rd and 4th to be their opponent and the day of play for the semifinals (RNG chose EG).

Semifinals
1	Royal Never Give Up	3
4	Evil Geniuses	0
2	T1	3
3	G2 Esports	0

Final
Royal Never Give Up	3
T1	2

=== Semifinals ===
Semifinals	May 27	Royal Never Give Up	3	–	0	Evil Geniuses	Busan, South Korea
	17:00 KST	Source					BEXCO
		1	Game 1			0	
		1	Game 2			0	
		1	Game 3			0	

Semifinals	May 28	T1	3	–	0	G2 Esports	Busan, South Korea
	17:00 KST	Source					BEXCO
		1	Game 1			0	
		1	Game 2			0	
		1	Game 3			0	

=== Finals ===
Final	May 29	Royal Never Give Up	3	–	2	T1	Busan, South Korea
	17:00 KST	Source					BEXCO
		1	Game 1			0	
		0	Game 2			1	
		1	Game 3			0	
		0	Game 4			1	
		1	Game 5			0	

== Ranking ==
(*) Not including tie-break games.

Place	League	Team	GS	RS	SF	Final	Prize (USD)	Prize (%)
1st	LPL	Royal Never Give Up	6–0	8–2	3–0	3–2	$75,000	30%
2nd	LCK	T1	6–0	7–3	3–0	2–3	$50,000	20%
3rd–4th	LEC	G2 Esports	8–0	5–5	0–3		$25,000	10%
3rd–4th	LCS	Evil Geniuses	4–4	5–5	0–3		$25,000	10%
5th	PCS	PSG Talon	3–3	3–7			$17,500	7%
6th	VCS	Saigon Buffalo	4–2	2–8			$17,500	7%
7th–8th	CBLOL	RED Canids	2–4				$8,325	3.33%
7th–8th	LCO	ORDER	0–8				$8,325	3.33%
9th–10th	LJL	DetonatioN FocusMe	1–5				$6,675	2.67%
9th–10th	LLA	Team Aze	1–5				$6,675	2.67%
11th	TCL	Istanbul Wildcats	1–5				$5,000	2%
