= Chiefs Esports Club =

Australian esports organisation

The Chiefs Esports Club
- Short name: The Chiefs, CHF
- Founded: 13 August 2014
- Location: Australia
- Divisions: League of Legends; Rainbow Six Siege; Rocket League
- Parent group: Team Bliss Esports
- Website: chiefsesc.com.au

The Chiefs Esports Club, often shortened to The Chiefs, is an Australian esports organisation.

The Chiefs' League of Legends team previously competed in the Oceanic Pro League (OPL), League of Legends Circuit Oceania (LCO), Pacific Championship Series (PCS only Playoffs), and League of Legends Championship Pacific (LCP).

== League of Legends ==
=== History ===
==== 2014 ====
In August 2014, the roster of Team Immunity left their organisation and formed Exodus Gaming, later rebranded as the Chiefs Esports Club. Their initial roster consisted of top laner Brandon "Swip3rR" Holland, jungler Samuel "Spookz" Broadley, mid laner Simon "Swiffer" Papamarkos, bot laner Derek "Raydere" Trang, and support Andrew "Rosey" Rose, and that five-man lineup became the longest-standing active roster without any substitutions or changes in history, unbroken for 608 days.

==== 2015 ====
In May 2015, that streak was broken when Rosey left the team to join Sin Gaming and was replaced by EGym. Despite their roster change, the Chiefs' lineup remained at the top of their region for the duration of the 2015 season, with OPL victories all four periods of the OPL; i.e. Split 1, Split 1 playoffs, Split 2, and Split 2 playoffs. Internationally, they fared less well, placing fifth at the International Wildcard Invitational in April and second at the International Wildcard Qualifier for Worlds 2015.

==== 2016 ====
In 2016, the Chiefs placed second for the first time domestically in the first OPL split, but still upset first-place Legacy Esports in the playoffs, to return to the IWCI once again. They then qualified for IEM Challenger for IEM Season 11 - Oakland—their first competition against teams from major regions—but lost 0–2 against Longzhu Gaming despite standout performances from Swiffer on Orianna.

==== 2017 ====
The Chiefs placed third in the OPL 2017 Split 1 regular season and fourth in playoffs after losing 2–3 to Sin Gaming in the second round. In the OPL 2017 Split 2 regular season, the Chiefs once again placed third in the regular season, but managed to advance all the way to the finals in playoffs, where they lost 1–3 to the Dire Wolves.

==== 2018 ====
For all four iterations of the 2018 OPL season (i.e. Split 1 and 2 regular seasons and playoffs), the Chiefs placed second, losing to Dire Wolves in both finals.

==== 2019 ====
The Chiefs placed second again in the OPL 2019 Split 1 regular season, but lost 3–0 to ORDER in the third round of playoffs and failed to make it to the finals. The 2019 OPL split 2 saw the Chiefs come first in the regular season, and coming second in playoffs, losing to Mammoth in the finals of the split 3–0.

==== 2020 ====
The Chiefs came second in the regular season of the 2020 OPL Split 1, and lost 2–3 to Dire Wolves in the playoffs, finishing third overall. After finishing fourth in the regular season of the 2020 OPL Split 2, the team went on to finish third once again in playoffs, losing to ORDER 1–3.

==== 2021 ====
The Chiefs were selected as one of the eight teams of the LCO following the dissolution of the OPL. Much of the team's 2020 roster left during the 2021 preseason, with only support Dragku remaining.

==== 2022 ====
The Chiefs would win the LCO Split 2 title in 2022, qualifying for 2022 Worlds, where they went winless and finished last in their play-in group.

==== 2023 ====
Upon the LCO's incorporation into the Pacific Championship Series in 2023, The Chiefs won both LCO splits that year, qualifying them for PCS playoffs both times. On both occasions, they would only win one game overall and finish tied for last place with the LCO's Team Bliss Esports.

==== 2024 ====
Upon Team Bliss acquiring The Chiefs, the spot occupied by the latter had to be sold, since no owning group could own two teams within the LCO. On 3 November 2023, their spot was sold to FURY Global.

==== 2025 ====
The Chiefs finished last in three consecutive stages of the 2025 LCP season and fell into the 2026 LCP season promotion and relegation qualifying event. In the end, they lost to Deep Cross Gaming in the promotion match and lost their qualification as a guest team in the 2026 LCP season.

== Counter-Strike: Global Offensive ==
The Chiefs Esports Club first entered the professional CS:GO scene with its acquisition of the Qlimax Crew in 2015. The Chiefs disbanded its CS:GO division in late 2021.
