= 2017 League of Legends World Championship =

Esports tournament

League of Legends World Championship
- 2017

Tournament information
- Location: China
- Dates: September 23–November 4
- Administrator: Riot Games
- Tournament format(s): 12 team double round-robin Play-in Stage; 16 team double round-robin group stage 8 team single-elimination bracket
- Venues: 4 (in 4 host cities): Wuhan (play-in stage & main group stage); Guangzhou (quarterfinals); Shanghai (semifinals); Beijing (finals)
- Teams: 24
- Purse: $4,596,591

Final positions
- Champion: Samsung Galaxy
- Runner-up: SK Telecom T1
- MVP: Park "Ruler" Jae-hyuk (Samsung Galaxy)

The 2017 League of Legends World Championship was an esports tournament for the multiplayer online battle arena video game League of Legends. It was the seventh iteration of the League of Legends World Championship, an annual international tournament organized by the game's developer, Riot Games. It was held from September 23 – November 4, 2017, in cities across China. Twenty four teams qualified for the tournament based on their placement in regional circuits such as those in North America, Europe, South Korea, and China, with twelve of those teams having to reach the group stage via a play-in round.

The finals featured a rematch of last year's competitors, and in 2017, Samsung Galaxy secured their second championship win after defeating the three-time world champion SK Telecom T1, with a 3–0 sweep in a best of five final series. Samsung has previously won the 2014 League of Legends World Championship. Park "Ruler" Jae-hyuk, the AD carry of Samsung, was named the MVP of the tournament for his outstanding performances.

Against The Current and Jay Chou collaborated with Riot Games to produce two exclusive songs titled "Legends Never Die" and "Hero" respectively for the tournament, while Alan Walker also produced his own remix of "Legends Never Die".

The 2017 World Championship was praised for its ceremonial performances, while receiving attention worldwide due to the high quality of the tournament, its multiple dramatic and emotional series, and SK Telecom T1's tributary moments. The finals was watched by 60 million unique viewers, breaking 2016's viewer record. A donation of US$2.35 million was also raised through the sales of Worlds 2017 Championship Ashe skin.

== Teams and qualifications ==
Based on the results of MSI and the World Championship in the previous two years, all teams from South Korea (LCK) were seeded directly into the group stage and Taiwan/Hong Kong/Macau (LMS) received an extra seed. With the ranking of the 2017 Mid Season Invitational, Southeast Asia (GPL) received a group stage seed for the summer champion team and one more slot in the play-in stage for the summer runner-up team, and the North American (NA LCS) summer split champion team was seeded to Pool 2 due to not qualifying for the top 4 at the MSI.

Region	League	Path	Teams	ID
Starting from Group stage
South Korea	LCK	Summer Champion	Longzhu Gaming	LZ
South Korea	LCK	Championship Points	SK Telecom T1	SKT
South Korea	LCK	Regional Finals	Samsung Galaxy	SSG
China	LPL	Summer Champion	Edward Gaming	EDG
China	LPL	Championship Points	Royal Never Give Up	RNG
Europe	EU LCS	Summer Champion	G2 Esports	G2
Europe	EU LCS	Championship Points	Misfits Gaming	MSF
North America	NA LCS	Summer Champion	Team SoloMid	TSM
North America	NA LCS	Championship Points	Immortals	IMT
TW/HK/Macau	LMS	Summer Champion	Flash Wolves	FW
TW/HK/Macau	LMS	Championship Points	ahq e-Sports Club	AHQ
Vietnam ►Southeast Asia	VCS►GPL	Summer Champion	GIGABYTE Marines	GAM
Starting from Play-in stage
China	LPL	Regional Finals	Team WE	WE
Europe	EU LCS	Regional Finals	Fnatic	FNC
North America	NA LCS	Regional Finals	Cloud9	C9
Vietnam ►Southeast Asia	VCS►GPL	Summer Runner-up	Young Generation	YG
TW/HK/Macau	LMS	Regional Finals	Hong Kong Attitude	HKA
Brazil	CBLOL	Summer Champion	Team oNe Esports	ONE
CIS	LCL	Summer Champion	Gambit Esports	GMB
Turkey	TCL	Summer Champion	1907 Fenerbahçe	FB
Japan	LJL	Summer Champion	Rampage	RPG
Latin America North	LLN	Summer Champion	Lyon Gaming	LYN
Latin America South	CLS	Summer Champion	Kaos Latin Gamers	KLG
Oceania	OPL	Summer Champion	Dire Wolves	DW

== Venues ==
Wuhan, Guangzhou, Shanghai, Beijing were the four cities chosen to host the competition.

China
Wuhan	Guangzhou	Shanghai	Beijing
Play-ins and Group Stage	Quarterfinals	Semifinals	Finals
Wuhan Sports Center Gymnasium	Guangzhou Gymnasium	Shanghai Oriental Sports Center	Beijing National Stadium
Capacity: 7,000	Capacity: 10,000	Capacity: 18,200	Capacity: 91,000
Sep 23 – Oct 15	Oct 19 – Oct 22	Oct 28 – Oct 29	Nov 4
2017 League of Legends World Championship is located in China

== Play-in stage ==
=== Groups ===
Group A

Pos	Team	Pld	W	L	PCT	Qualification
1	Team WE	4	4	0	1.000	Advance to play-in knockouts
2	Lyon Gaming	4	2	2	.500	Advance to play-in knockouts
3	Gambit Esports	4	0	4	.000	

Source: LoL Esports (Archived 2018-12-18 at the Wayback Machine)

Group B

Pos	Team	Pld	W	L	PCT	Qualification
1	Cloud9	4	4	0	1.000	Advance to play-in knockouts
2	Team One Esports	5	2	3	.400	Advance to play-in knockouts
3	Dire Wolves	5	1	4	.200	

Source: LoL Esports (Archived 2018-12-18 at the Wayback Machine)

Group C

Pos	Team	Pld	W	L	PCT	Qualification
1	Fnatic	4	3	1	.750	Advance to play-in knockouts
2	Young Generation	4	2	2	.500	Advance to play-in knockouts
3	Kaos Latin Gamers	4	1	3	.250	

Source: LoL Esports (Archived 2018-12-18 at the Wayback Machine)

Group D

Pos	Team	Pld	W	L	PCT	Qualification
1	1907 Fenerbahçe Espor	5	4	1	.800	Advance to play-in knockouts
2	Hong Kong Attitude	5	3	2	.600	Advance to play-in knockouts
3	Rampage	4	0	4	.000	

Source: LoL Esports (Archived 2018-12-18 at the Wayback Machine)

=== Knockouts ===
Round 1
Team WE	3
Young Generation	0
Cloud9	3
Lyon Gaming	0
Fnatic	3
Hong Kong Attitude	0
1907 Fenerbahçe	3
Team oNe Esports	1

Source: LoL Esports (Archived 2018-12-18 at the Wayback Machine)

== Group stage ==
Group A

Pos	Team	Pld	W	L	PCT	Qualification
1	SK Telecom T1	6	5	1	.833	Advance to knockouts
2	Cloud9	6	3	3	.500	Advance to knockouts
3	ahq e-Sports Club	6	2	4	.333	
4	Edward Gaming	6	2	4	.333	

Source: LoL Esports (Archived 2018-12-18 at the Wayback Machine)

Group B

Pos	Team	Pld	W	L	PCT	Qualification
1	Longzhu Gaming	6	6	0	1.000	Advance to knockouts
2	Fnatic	8	4	4	.500	Advance to knockouts
3	GIGABYTE Marines	7	2	5	.286	
4	Immortals	7	2	5	.286	

Source: LoL Esports (Archived 2018-12-18 at the Wayback Machine)
Rules for classification: 1) Winning percentage; 2) Tiebreaker match(es); 3) Total game victory time (Note: The total amount of time it took a team to win their games against all other teams in the tiebreaker)

Group C

Pos	Team	Pld	W	L	PCT	Qualification
1	Royal Never Give Up	6	5	1	.833	Advance to knockouts
2	Samsung Galaxy	6	4	2	.667	Advance to knockouts
3	G2 Esports	6	3	3	.500	
4	1907 Fenerbahçe Espor	6	0	6	.000	

Source: LoL Esports (Archived 2018-12-18 at the Wayback Machine)

Group D

Pos	Team	Pld	W	L	PCT	Qualification
1	Team WE	6	5	1	.833	Advance to knockouts
2	Misfits Gaming	7	4	3	.571	Advance to knockouts
3	Team SoloMid	7	3	4	.429	
4	Flash Wolves	6	1	5	.167	

Source: LoL Esports (Archived 2018-12-18 at the Wayback Machine)

== Knockout stage ==
=== Bracket ===
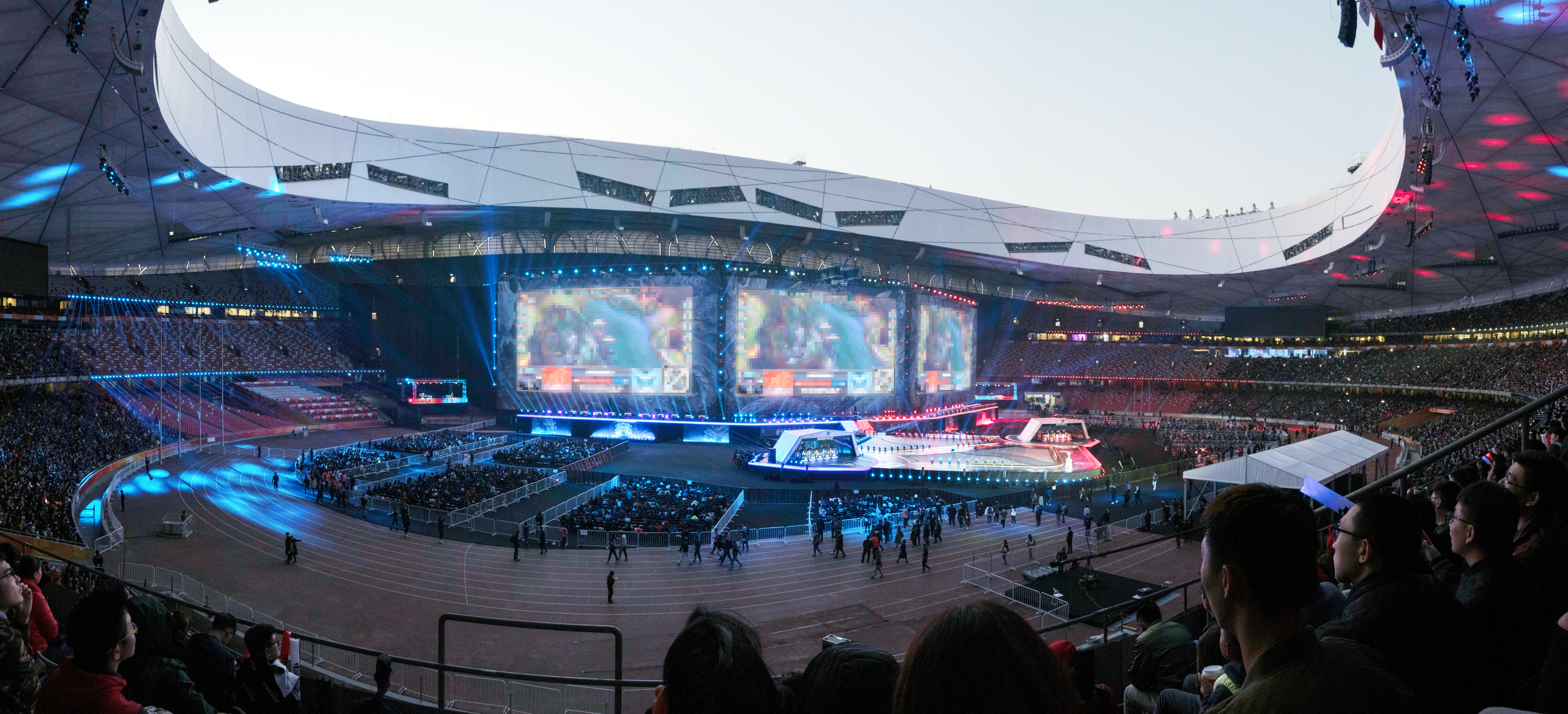
The stage for the finals between SKT T1 and Samsung Galaxy in the Beijing National Stadium

Quarterfinals
A1	SK Telecom T1	3
D2	Misfits Gaming	2
C1	Royal Never Give Up	3
B2	Fnatic	1
D1	Team WE	3
A2	Cloud9	2
B1	Longzhu Gaming	0
C2	Samsung Galaxy	3

Semifinals
SK Telecom T1	3
Royal Never Give Up	2
Team WE	1
Samsung Galaxy	3

Final
SK Telecom T1	0
Samsung Galaxy	3

=== Quarterfinals ===
Quarterfinals	October 19	Longzhu Gaming	0	–	3	Samsung Galaxy	Guangzhou, China
		Source					Guangzhou Gymnasium
		0	Game 1			1	
		0	Game 2			1	
		0	Game 3			1	

Quarterfinals	October 20	SK Telecom T1	3	–	2	Misfits Gaming	Guangzhou, China
		Source					Guangzhou Gymnasium
		1	Game 1			0	
		0	Game 2			1	
		0	Game 3			1	
		1	Game 4			0	
		1	Game 5			0	

Quarterfinals	October 21	Royal Never Give Up	3	–	1	Fnatic	Guangzhou, China
		Source					Guangzhou Gymnasium
		1	Game 1			0	
		1	Game 2			0	
		0	Game 3			1	
		1	Game 4			0	

Quarterfinals	October 22	Team WE	3	–	2	Cloud9	Guangzhou, China
		Source					Guangzhou Gymnasium
		1	Game 1			0	
		0	Game 2			1	
		0	Game 3			1	
		1	Game 4			0	
		1	Game 5			0	

=== Semifinals ===
Semifinals	October 28	SK Telecom T1	3	–	2	Royal Never Give Up	Shanghai, China
		Source					Shanghai Oriental Sports Center
		0	Game 1			1	
		1	Game 2			0	
		0	Game 3			1	
		1	Game 4			0	
		1	Game 5			0	

Semifinals	October 29	Team WE	1	–	3	Samsung Galaxy	Shanghai, China
		Source					Shanghai Oriental Sports Center
		1	Game 1			0	
		0	Game 2			1	
		0	Game 3			1	
		0	Game 4			1	

=== Final ===
Final	November 4	SK Telecom T1	0	–	3	Samsung Galaxy	Beijing, China
		Source					Beijing National Stadium
		0	Game 1			1	
		0	Game 2			1	
		0	Game 3			1	

== Final standings ==
Final standings, 2017
Places	Team	Prize (USD)
1st	Samsung Galaxy	$1,855,114
2nd	SK Telecom T1	$667,841
3rd–4th	Royal Never Give Up	$346,288
3rd–4th	Team WE	$346,288
5–8th	Longzhu Gaming	$197,879
5–8th	Misfits Gaming	$197,879
5–8th	Fnatic	$197,879
5–8th	Cloud9	$197,879
9–11th	TSM	$111,307
9–11th	G2 Esports	$111,307
9–11th	GIGABYTE Marines	$111,307
12–13th	Edward Gaming	$86,571
12–13th	ahq e-Sports Club	$86,571
14–16th	Flash Wolves	$61,837
14–16th	Immortals	$61,837
14–16th	1907 Fenerbahçe	$61,837
17–20th	Lyon Gaming	$37,102
17–20th	Hong Kong Attitude	$37,102
17–20th	Team oNe Esports	$37,102
17–20th	Young Generation	$37,102
21–24th	Rampage	$24,735
21–24th	Kaos Latin Gamers	$24,735
21–24th	Dire Wolves	$24,735
21–24th	Gambit Esports	$24,735
Total		$4,946,970

== Entertainment ==
=== League of Legends Live ===
League of Legends Live was held on the eve of the finals, November 3, in Beijing National Aquatics Center (or known as the Water Cube) to commemorate the tournament, featuring international artists and League of Legends community musicians. It featured performances of a wide variety of music from League of Legends, including Get Jinxed, hits from Pentakill, DJ Sona, Warsongs, Star Guardian, The Curse Of The Sad Mummy, medleys of a wide variety of Worlds and Champion themes, DJ and music producer Alan Walker, and many other tracks over the course of the 90-minute show.

=== Opening and closing ceremonies ===
During the opening ceremony of the finals, dancers wore different masks, as the ground around them had visual effects and colors. It was followed by Jay Chou's Worlds 2017 remix Hero performance, and a live version of Legends Never Die by Against the Current, with Chou playing the piano behind. An augmented reality dragon (modeled after the in-game Elder Drake) also flew around the arena halfway through the performance, with the Summoner's Cup rising from the grounds of the stadium at the same time. The closing ceremony featured Alan Walker performing his own remix of Legends Never Die, with Chrissy Costanza on the vocals. The overall performances of the ceremonies were well received.

== Legacy ==
The finals had 60 million unique viewers worldwide, breaking 2016's viewer record.

League of Legends fans raised over US$2 million for three different charities (BasicNeeds, Learning Equality and the Raspberry Pi Foundation) with the sales of the "Worlds 2017 Championship Ashe" skin.

SK Telecom T1's 0–3 defeat in the finals, along with Faker crying after the series concluded, has led to the game being considered to be one of the greatest upsets in League of Legends history.
