= Bombers (esports) =

Australian League of Legends team (2017–2019)

- Short name: BMR
- Game: League of Legends
- Founded: 14 December 2017
- Folded: 2 December 2019
- League: Oceanic Pro League (OPL)
- Based in: Melbourne, Australia
- Head coach: Luchio "SoulStrikes" Park
- Manager: Nathan "Euphoria" Mathews-Mallia
- Parent group: Essendon Football Club
- Website: www.bombers.gg

The Bombers were an Australian professional League of Legends team based in the Tullamarine suburb of Melbourne. Their name came from their parent organization, the Essendon Football Club, which is nicknamed the "Bombers". The team competed in the Oceanic Pro League (OPL), the highest level of professional League of Legends in Oceania.

== History ==
The Essendon Football Club announced on 14 December 2017 that it had purchased the OPL team Abyss Esports, becoming the second AFL team to enter the professional League of Legends scene after the Adelaide Football Club, which wholly acquired Legacy Esports in May 2017. However, unlike Adelaide, Essendon rebranded Abyss Esports along with the acquisition. The team was also relocated from Sydney to the Tullamarine suburb of Melbourne, where Essendon is based.

The Bombers' first roster consisted of top laner Christian "Sleeping" Tiensuu, jungler Sebastian "Seb" de Ceglie, mid laner Carlo "Looch" La Civita, bot laner Alan "Tiger" Roger, and support Andrew "Rosey" Rose. The team finished 6th in the OPL 2018 Split 1 and 5th in the OPL 2018 Split 2. Every player on the Bombers' original roster left in the offseason before the OPL 2019 Split 1 (except for Seb, who was moved to a substitute position). In December 2018, the team acquired a new roster consisting of top laner Min "Mimic" Ju-seong, jungler Choi "BalKhan" Hyun-jin, mid laner Tommy "ry0ma" Le, bot laner Victor "FBI" Huang, and support Jake "Rogue" Sharwood, the latter three of which were already veterans of the OPL. The new roster dominated the regular season of the OPL 2019 Split 1, ending in first place with a 19–2 record and directly qualifying for the grand finals, where they swept ORDER 3–0 to claim their first OPL title. The Bombers' victory in the grand finals qualified them for the 2019 Mid-Season Invitational as Oceania's representative in the play-in stage.

The Bombers were placed in Group A of the first round of the 2019 Mid-Season Invitational play-in stage, along with Turkish team 1907 Fenerbahçe, Vietnamese team Phong Vũ Buffalo, and Argentine team Isurus Gaming. The team ended third in their group and eleventh to twelfth overall with a 2–4 record, failing to qualify for the second round of the play-in stage. BalKhan left the team shortly after on 6 May 2019.

LCS team Golden Guardians announced on 28 May 2019 that it had acquired FBI from the Bombers for its academy team. To fill in the vacant positions for OPL 2019 Split 2, jungler Jeong "Wilder" Jin-woo was acquired from Japanese team Burning Core, while Looch rejoined as a bot laner from the Bombers' academy team. The Bombers finished third in the regular season and fourth in playoffs after getting knocked out in the second round by ORDER.

On 2 December 2019, it was announced that the Bombers' OPL slot had been sold to Perth-based internet provider Pentanet. Pentanet founded the esports organisation Pentanet.GG shortly afterwards.

== Season-by-season records ==
Year		Oceanic Pro League						Mid-Season Invitational	World Championship
Year		P	W	L	W–L	Pos.	Playoffs	Mid-Season Invitational	World Championship
2018	Split 1	19	5	17	.227	6th	Did not qualify	Did not qualify	Did not qualify
2018	Split 2	25	10	15	.400	5th	Round 1	Did not qualify	Did not qualify
2019	Split 1	21	19	2	.905	1st	Champions	Play-in stage	Did not qualify
2019	Split 2	21	14	7	.667	3rd	Round 2	Play-in stage	Did not qualify
