= Oceanic Pro League =

League of Legends esports league (2015–2020)

- Game: League of Legends
- Founded: 2015
- Folded: 7 October 2020
- Replaced by: League of Legends Circuit Oceania
- Owner: Riot Games Oceania
- No. of teams: 8
- Countries: Oceania (Note: Although Riot Games Oceania considers citizens of all Oceanic countries to be domestic players when competing in the OPL and OCS, most domestic players are from either Australia or New Zealand. Live matches are played in Sydney, Australia.)
- Last champion: Legacy Esports (2nd title)
- Most titles: Chiefs Esports Club; Dire Wolves (4 titles each)
- Broadcaster: Twitch

The Oceanic Pro League (OPL) was the top-level of professional League of Legends competition in Oceania. Founded in 2015 and organized by Riot Games Oceania, the league had eight teams. Matches were live streamed on Twitch and YouTube, the latter having on-demand-video archives for the OPL and the lower division Oceanic Challenger Series (OCS). The winners of OPL Split 1 qualified for the Mid-Season Invitational (MSI), while the winners of Split 2 qualified for the World Championship.

Riot Games announced the dissolution of the OPL on 7 October 2020, citing operation costs and failures to reach company-set goals. Riot Games closed its Sydney office, which had run the league. It was also announced that players with Oceanic residency would be allowed to participate in North America's LCS without filling an import slot.

ESL Australia announced on 18 December 2020 that they would be creating a new professional league for Oceania in 2021 to replace the OPL. The league was later named League of Legends Circuit Oceania (LCO).

== Result ==
Year	Split	Champion	Runner-up	Third-place	Fourth-place
2015	1	Chiefs Esports Club	Dire Wolves	Legacy Esports	Team Immunity
2015	2	Chiefs Esports Club	Legacy Esports	Avant Garde	Dire Wolves
2016	1	Chiefs Esports Club	Legacy Esports	Dire Wolves	Sin Gaming
2016	2	Chiefs Esports Club	Legacy Esports	Avant Garde	Dire Wolves
2017	1	Dire Wolves	Legacy eSports	Sin Gaming	Chiefs Esports Club
2017	2	Dire Wolves	Chiefs Esports Club	Legacy Esports	Sin Gaming
2018	1	Dire Wolves	Chiefs Esports Club	Legacy Esports	ORDER
2018	2	Dire Wolves	Chiefs Esports Club	Legacy Esports	ORDER
2019	1	Bombers	ORDER	Chiefs Esports Club	Avant Gaming
2019	2	Mammoth	Chiefs Esports Club	ORDER	Bombers
2020	1	Legacy Esports	Dire Wolves	Chiefs Esports Club	ORDER
2020	2	Legacy Esports	ORDER	Chiefs Esports Club	Pentanet.GG
