= Isurus Gaming =

Argentine esports organisation

Isurus
- Founded: 15 April 2011
- League: CLUTCH Circuit (CS:GO); Liga Latinoamérica (LoL)
- Based in: Argentina (organization); Brazil (CS:GO); Mexico (LoL)
- Location: South America
- Owner: Facundo "Kala" Calabró
- General manager: Belén "Bekindra" Silveira
- Divisions: Counter-Strike: Global Offensive; League of Legends
- Website: teamisurus.com

Isurus Gaming, or simply Isurus, is an Argentine professional esports organization with teams competing in Counter-Strike: Global Offensive and League of Legends.

Its League of Legends team competes in the League of Legends Championship of The Americas South. Isurus was the inaugural champion of the Liga Latinoamérica (LLA), winning both the opening cup and closing cup of the league's first year of play in 2019. These two championships qualified Isurus for the 2019 Mid-Season Invitational and the 2019 World Championship, respectively.

== Counter-Strike: Global Offensive ==
Isurus Gaming's first CS:GO team was created on 15 August 2012 and consisted of Valhalla, Rew4z, mvk, Nyogen, Otto and Andromeda, all of whom joined from the organization's previous CS: Source roster. Since then Isurus has exclusively signed Argentine players, with the exception of Uruguayan maxujas who currently plays as one of the team's entry fraggers. Isurus' CS:GO team competes in Brazil's CLUTCH Circuit, as well as other regional and international tournaments.

== League of Legends ==
Isurus Gaming first entered the professional League of Legends scene in 2013, acquiring an all-Argentine roster. They continued to field only Argentine players until late 2014, when they acquired Uruguayan top laner Juan "MANTARRAYA" Abdón. Isurus' first major title was the 2016 LAS Opening Cup, which they won after defeating Last Kings 3–0. This qualified them for the 2016 International Wildcard Invitational, where they placed seventh with a 2–5 record, failing to qualify for the 2016 Mid-Season Invitational. Isurus would later go on to win the 2016 LAS Closing Cup and the 2017 LAS Opening Cup, the latter of which qualified them for the 2017 Mid-Season Invitational. Despite consistently placing top three in the LAS, Isurus would not win another title until the creation of the Liga Latinoamérica (LLA) in 2019.

Isurus won both the opening and closing cups of the LLA's 2019 season, the former qualifying them for the play-in stage of the 2019 Mid-Season Invitational and the latter qualifying them for the play-in stage of the 2019 World Championship. At the 2019 Mid-Season Invitational, Isurus was placed in Group A of the first round of the play-in stage, along with Australian team Bombers, Turkish team 1907 Fenerbahçe, and Vietnamese team Phong Vũ Buffalo. Isurus finished tied for last in Group A with Bombers, placing tenth to twelfth overall.

At the 2019 World Championship, Isurus was placed in Group B of the first round of the play-in stage, along with European team Splyce and Japanese team DetonatioN FocusMe. Following the double round robin Isurus placed second in Group B with a 2–2 record, qualifying for the second round, where they were defeated by Hong Kong Attitude and eliminated from the tournament.
