= MVK Esports =

Vietnamese League of Legends team

- Short name: MVK
- Game: League of Legends
- Founded: November 2016
- Based in: Ho Chi Minh City, Vietnam
- Head coach: Lê "SofM" Quang Duy
- Manager: Nguyễn "Lily" Hoài Thương

MVK Esports is a Vietnamese professional League of Legends team competing in the League of Legends Championship Pacific. It was founded in 2016 as Young Generation and has since gone through several rebrands. (Note: Formerly known as: Young Generation (November 2016 – 18 May 2018); Phong Vũ Buffalo (18 May 2018 – 31 May 2019); Dashing Buffalo (31 May 2019 – 25 May 2020); Saigon Buffalo (25 May 2020 – 25 November 2023); Viking Esports (25 November 2023 – 5 December 2024); MGN Viking Esports (5 December 2024 – 30 December 2025)) MVK previously competed in the Vietnam Championship Series (VCS), where the team was crowned champions twice. MVK has qualified for the World Championship in 2017, 2018, 2022, and 2026, as well as the Mid-Season Invitational in 2019 and 2022.

== History ==
On 18 May 2018, Young Generation rebranded to Phong Vũ Buffalo after agreeing to a sponsorship deal with Phong Vũ, a major computer company in Vietnam. The team dominated in its first split in the VCS, losing only one series to EVOS Esports and one to GIGABYTE Marines, ending with a series record of 12 wins and 2 losses in the 2018 VCS Summer Split. This placement secured them a spot in finals of the VCS 2018 Summer Playoffs, where they defeated Cube Adonis 3–1 and qualified for the 2018 World Championship.

Because of EVOS Esports' placement at the 2018 Mid-Season Invitational, Vietnam was given a spot in the main event at the 2018 League of Legends World Championship, allowing Phong Vũ Buffalo to avoid the need to qualify through the play-in stage. For the group stage, Phong Vũ Buffalo was drawn into Group A, along with the Afreeca Freecs, the Flash Wolves, and G2 Esports. The team ended the group stage with 2 win and 4 losses, failing to qualify for the knockout stage.

Phong Vũ Buffalo placed 1st in the 2019 VCS Spring Split regular season, with a record of 13 wins and 1 loss. This directly qualified the team for the finals, where they defeated EVOS Esports 3–1 to qualify for the 2019 Mid-Season Invitational as Vietnam's representative.

Phong Vũ Buffalo was placed in Group A of the first round of the 2019 Mid-Season Invitational play-in stage, along with Turkish team 1907 Fenerbahçe, Australian team Bombers, and Argentine team Isurus Gaming. The team ended the group round robin with a record of 4 wins and 2 losses, tying 1907 Fenerbahçe for 1st and forcing a tiebreaker match, which 1907 Fenerbahçe lost. Phong Vũ Buffalo's victory qualified them for the second round of the play-in stage, where they lost 0–3 to Team Liquid. This result forced Phong Vũ Buffalo to play in a third round against Vega Squadron, who they defeated 3–2 in a close series, securing themselves a spot in the main event. Phong Vũ Buffalo placed last in the group stage of the main event with a 2–8 record, failing to advance to the knock-out stage.

On 31 May 2019, the organization announced it was renaming to Dashing Buffalo to reflect a change in its sponsorship, with Dashing Shampoo becoming its primary sponsor.

Dashing Buffalo renamed to Saigon Buffalo on 26 May 2020 to reflect its partnership with the Saigon Heat.

In November 2022, the South Korean esports-focused think tank JUEGO signed a deal to acquire Saigon Buffalo, but the deal fell through.

Saigon Buffalo was renamed Vikings Esports after the 2023 season.

The team rebranded as MVK Esports prior to the 2026 season.

== Current roster ==
MVK Esports League of Legends roster
Players
Coaches

Role	Handle	Name	Nationality
Top	Kratos	Ngô Đức Khánh	Vietnam
Jungle	Gury	Lương Hải Long	Vietnam
Jungle	SanSan	Lê Quốc Khánh	Vietnam
Mid	Chika	Võ Lê Nhân	Vietnam
Bot	Harky	Nguyễn Văn Hữu	Vietnam
Support	SiuLoong	Nguyễn Hoàng Lam	Vietnam

Head coach

Lê "SofM" Quang Duy

Assistant coach(es)

- Đặng "Bigkoro" Ngọc Tài
- Phan "Suga" Bá Phúc

Legend:
- (I) Inactive
- (S) Suspended
- Substitute
- (injured) Injury / Illness

== Tournament results ==
Placement	Event	Final result (W–L)
Qualified	VCS A 2017 Spring Promotion	2–0 (against Cherry Gaming)
2nd	VCS A 2017 Spring	10–2
2nd	VCS A 2017 Spring Playoffs	0–3
2nd	VCS A 2017 Summer	10–4
2nd	VCS A 2017 Summer Playoffs	0–3
2nd	GPL 2017 Summer	3–2 (against Ascension Gaming)
17th–20th	2017 World Championship	0–3 (against Team WE)
4th	VCS 2018 Spring	8–6
4th	VCS 2018 Spring Playoffs	1–3 (against GIGABYTE Marines)
1st	VCS 2018 Summer	12–2
1st	VCS 2018 Summer Playoffs	3–1 (against Cube Adonis)
13th–16th	2018 World Championship	2–4
1st	VCS 2019 Spring	13–1
1st	VCS 2019 Spring Playoffs	3–1 (against EVOS Esports)
6th	2019 Mid-Season Invitational	2–8 (main event)
3rd	Rift Rivals 2019 LCK-LPL-LMS-VCS	0–3 (against LPL)
4th	VCS 2019 Summer	8–6
4th	VCS 2019 Summer Playoffs	0–3 (against Lowkey Esports)
6th	VCS 2020 Spring	5–9
2nd	2020 Pulsefire Cup	1–3 (against GAM Esports)
7th	VCS 2020 Summer	3–11
Qualified	VCS 2021 Spring Promotion	3–1 (against V Gaming)
2nd	VCS 2021 Spring	10–4
2nd	VCS 2021 Spring Playoffs	1–3 (against GAM Esports)
5th	VCS 2021 Winter	6–8
2nd	31st SEA Games, Vietnam qualifier	1–3 (against GAM Esports)
2nd	VCS 2022 Spring	9–5
2nd	VCS 2022 Spring Playoffs	1–3 (against GAM Esports)
6th	2022 Mid-Season Invitational	2–8
3rd	VCS 2022 Summer	8–6
2nd	VCS 2022 Summer Playoffs	0–3 (against GAM Esports)
19–20th	2022 World Championship	1–3 (against MAD Lions)
17th	2026 World Championship	0–3 (against Karmine Corp)
