= League of Legends Circuit Oceania =

Esports league (2021–2024)

- Formerly: Oceanic Pro League
- Game: League of Legends
- Founded: 2021
- Folded: 2024
- Replaced by: LCP Oceanic Promotion Qualifier (OPQ)
- Owners: ESL Australia; Guinevere Capital
- No. of teams: 8
- Countries: Oceania
- Last champion: Ground Zero (2024 Split 2)
- Most titles: Chiefs Esports Club (3 titles)
- Website: https://lco.gg/

The League of Legends Circuit Oceania (LCO) was the top-level of professional League of Legends competition in Oceania, (Note: Most domestic players of Oceanic countries are from either Australia or New Zealand.) founded in 2021 and hosted by ESL Australia and Guinevere Capital.

== History ==
The LCO replaced the Oceanic Pro League (OPL), hosted by Riot Games Oceania from 2015 to 2020. Eight teams were announced for the inaugural season: Chiefs Esports Club, Dire Wolves, Gravitas, Legacy Esports, Mammoth, ORDER, Pentanet.GG and Avant Gaming. The annual season consisted of two splits, each of which conclude in a double-elimination tournament between the top five teams.

Before 2023, the winner of split 1 qualified for the Mid-Season Invitational (MSI), while the winner of split 2 qualified for the League of Legends World Championship. However, in 2023 and 2024, the top two teams from each LCO split were seeded into the Pacific Championship Series (PCS) playoffs and competed with other PCS (and later LJL) teams for a chance to represent the larger region at international events. LCO teams no longer qualified directly to MSI and Worlds.

On 20 September 2024, the LCO officially folded, with Riot Games exploring "new solutions" to replace it. It would be replaced in 2025 by the Oceanic Promotion Qualifier (OPQ), which would send its winner to the Promotion Playoffs for the new Asia-Pacific tier 1 league, the League of Legends Championship Pacific (LCP). "Saving OCE" would win the 2025 OPQ, before being eliminated in the 2025 Promotion Playoffs in the first round of the Free-For-All Bracket.

Since the LCO's dissolution, two of its former members have gone on to be part of the LCP. Chiefs Esports Club would be in the league's inaugural season as a guest team, but would be relegated after finishing as the worst team in the LCP and losing in the Free-For-All qualifying match to Deep Cross Gaming of the now tier 2 PCS. Ground Zero Gaming would move to the PCS in 2025 but similarly had bad results against Taiwanese opposition. However, as a result of PSG Talon being removed from the LCP following financial issues, GZ would be announced as their replacement for 2026 in December 2025, also as a guest team.

== Format (2023) ==
=== Regular season ===
- Eight teams participate.
- Double round-robin, best-of-one.
- Top five teams advance to playoffs.

=== Playoffs ===
- Five teams participate
- Double elimination bracket.
  - The 1st-place team from regular season receives a bye to begin in the second round of winners' bracket.
  - The 2nd and 3rd-place teams begin in the first round of the winners' bracket.
  - The 4th and 5h-place teams begin in the first round of the losers' bracket.

The top 2 teams of each split will represent Oceania at the Pacific Championship Series, entering that tournament's playoffs.

== Result ==
Year	Split	Champion	Runner-up	Third-place	Fourth-place
2021	1	Pentanet.GG	PEACE	Chiefs Esports Club	Dire Wolves
2021	2	PEACE	Pentanet.GG	Dire Wolves	ORDER
2022	1	ORDER	Chiefs Esports Club	Pentanet.GG	PEACE
2022	2	Chiefs Esports Club	Pentanet.GG	ORDER	Kanga Esports
2023	1	Chiefs Esports Club	Team Bliss	Dire Wolves	Pentanet.GG
2023	2	Chiefs Esports Club	Team Bliss	MAMMOTH	Vertex Esports Club
2024	1	Ground Zero	Antic Esports	Team Bliss	Kanga Esports
2024	2	Ground Zero	Team Bliss	Antic Esports	ION Global Esports
