= 2026 League of Legends World Championship final =

League of Legends esports series

2026 League of Legends World Championship Final
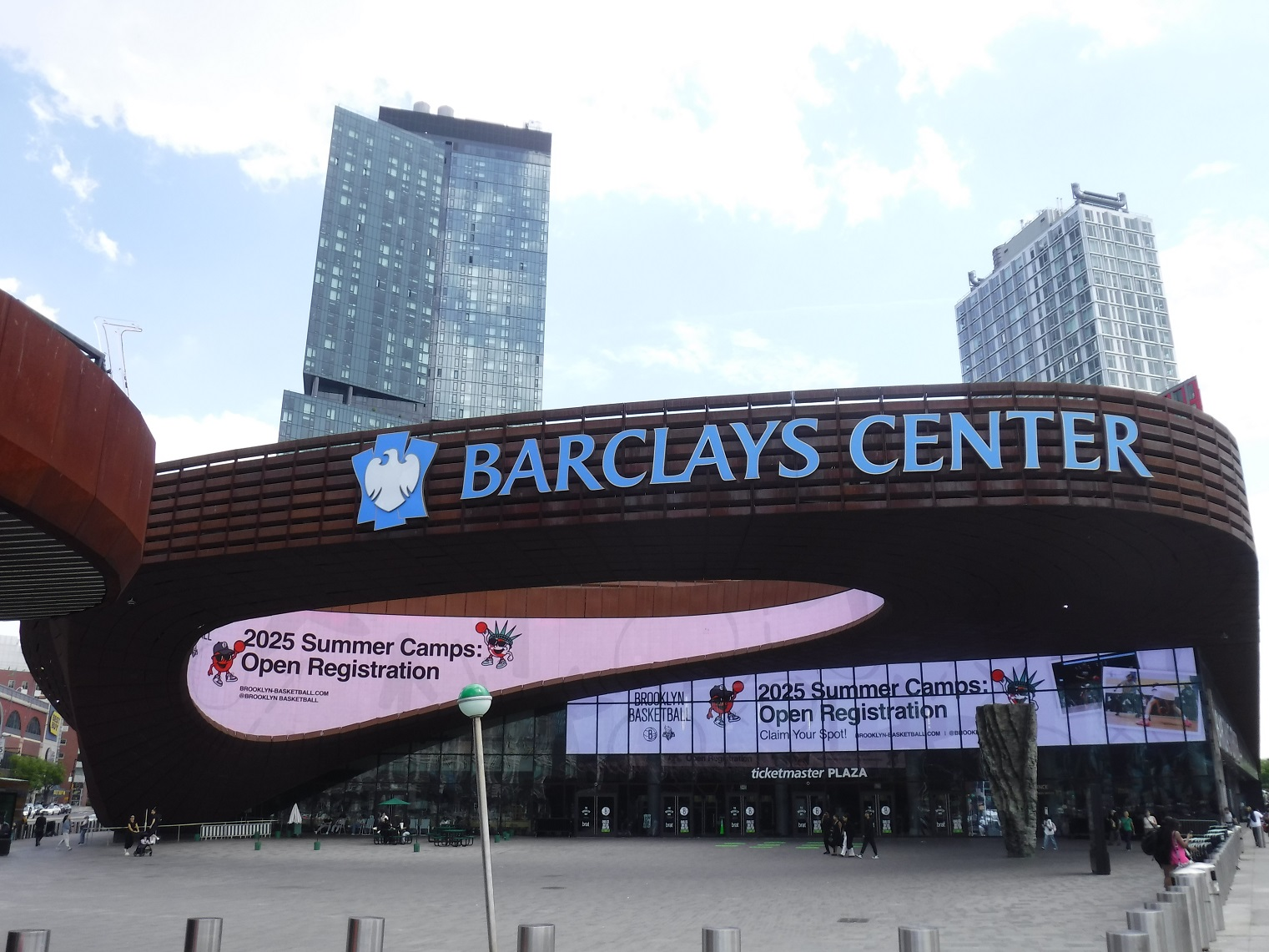
- The Barclays Center hosted the final series.
GEN	BLG
1	3
- Date: 14 November 2026
- Venue: Barclays Center, Brooklyn, New York City, United States
- MVP: Zhuo "Knight" Ding

Live Broadcast
- Announcers: English Clayton "CaptainFlowers" Raines Andrew "Vedius" Day Sam "Kobe" Hartman-Kenzler; Chinese Wang "Wang Duoduo" Qianyuan Wang "Remember" Chi-te Qian "Mille" Chen Feng "Rita" Yu Ke "957" Changyu Zhang Boheng; Korean Chun "Caster Jun" Yong-jun Lee "CloudTemplar" Hyun-woo Go "Ggoggo" Su-jin

The 2026 League of Legends World Championship Final was a League of Legends (LoL) esports series taking place at the Barclays Center in Brooklyn, New York City, United States, marking the sixteenth final of the League of Legends World Championship.

It was the first finals appearance for Gen.G under its current name and its third since the 2017 edition when Samsung Galaxy won the championship. The team was one of four Korean representatives from the League of Legends Champions Korea (LCK), the others being 2026 Mid-Season Invitational champions Hanwha Life Esports, 2025 world champions T1, and Dplus Kia. The finals marked the second appearance for Bilibili Gaming after losing the 2024 final, entering as the 2026 First Stand Tournament champions and as one of four Chinese representatives from the League of Legends Pro League (LPL) alongside Anyone's Legend, Top Esports, and Invictus Gaming.

The series was a best of five and was the first World Championship final to be held in the East Coast of the United States, as all prior finals held in North America were held in Los Angeles (2012, 2013, 2016) and San Francisco (2022) - all on the country's West Coast. It was also the first finals since 2021 to not feature T1, after four consecutive appearances from 2022 to 2025.

Bilibili Gaming won the series, 3–1, winning three consecutive games after facing a 0–1 deficit after the first game, winning their first World Championship and second international title as an organization. It was also the first World Championship for the LPL since 2021, and its fourth overall - ending the LCK's streak of four consecutive titles from 2022 to 2025. BLG's victory was described as one of the most legendary World Championship runs in League of Legends history, eliminating all four LCK representatives from the final round of the Swiss stage up to the final.

BLG mid-laner Zhuo "Knight" Ding earned Most Valuable Player honors and became the first Chinese mid-laner to win a World Championship, and the first non-Korean mid-laner to win the event since Kurtis "Toyz" Lau of the Taipei Assassins in 2012. Meanwhile, the victory marked the second World Championship for attack damage carry (ADC) Park "Viper" Do-hyeon after winning with Edward Gaming in 2021 - becoming only the second player since support Cho "BeryL" Geon-hee to have multiple titles not under the SKT T1 or T1 banner.

== Background and host selection ==
During the media day for the 2025 World Championship Final in Chengdu, China on 7 November 2025, Riot Games announced the host cities of the 2026 edition of Worlds, with Allen, Texas of the Dallas–Fort Worth metroplex hosting the swiss stage, quarterfinals, and semifinals; and New York City staging the Finals. It had been announced previously on 8 January 2025 that the 2026 tournament would be held in North America in a development update video for the game posted by Riot Games to begin that year's competitive season. Los Angeles was added as a host city on 22 March 2026 and will host the play-in stage. New York City was one of the host cities of the 2016 and 2022 editions of the League of Legends World Championship - all of which in the Midtown Manhattan area. In 2016, the semifinals were held at the Madison Square Garden, while the group stage and quarterfinals in 2022 took place at MSG's The Theater, which was then known as the Hulu Theater and was the venue's first esports event.

On 22 March 2026, during the finals of the 2026 First Stand Tournament in São Paulo, Brazil, Riot Games announced that the Barclays Center in Brooklyn, one of the city's five boroughs, would host the final series. Opened in 2012, the arena is the home venue of the Brooklyn Nets and the New York Liberty of the National Basketball Association (NBA) and the Women's National Basketball Association (WNBA), respectively, and has hosted the 2018 Overwatch League Grand Finals and the ESL One New York Counter-Strike: Global Offensive tournament on four occassions.

== Route to the final ==
=== Gen.G ===
Ruler made his third World Championship finals after finishing second in 2016 and winning his first World Championship in 2017 with Samsung Galaxy.

Prior to the 2018 season, Samsung Galaxy won the 2017 League of Legends World Championship, beating then-defending champions SK Telecom T1 in a 3–0 sweep. In November 2017, weeks after the final, the team was acquired by KSV Esports following the latter's acquisition of Samsung's esports division. In its first and eventually its only split, KSV finished at 5th place in the 2018 League of Legends Champions Korea (LCK) Spring split, with a 9–9 win-loss slate. On May 3, 2018, KSV announced that it was rebranding to Gen.G Esports, with the team debuting at that year's Summer split, finishing at joint-first place in the regular season with a 13–5 record but became the fourth seed after multiple tiebreaker rules. Despite losing to Afreeca Freecs in the first playoff round, Gen.G managed to qualify for the 2018 World Championship by winning the regional qualifiers across three games against SK Telecom T1 (3–2), Griffin (3–2), and Spring split champions Kingzone DragonX (3–0). In their debut appearance at Worlds, Gen.G finished last in their group with a 1–5 win-loss record.

2019 saw Gen.G finishing sixth and seventh in the LCK Spring and Summer splits, respectively, missing out on qualifying for that year's World Championship. Before the 2020 season, the team underwent a roster overhaul, retaining only two players including ADC Park "Ruler" Jae-hyuk, who had been with the team since 2016 and during Samsung Galaxy's 2017 World Championship run. In the 2020 season, the squad had a 14–4 win-loss slate in each of the Spring and Summer splits, but did not manage to win a domestic championship, losing to T1, 0-3, in the Spring finals, and to DRX in the Summer semifinals, 2-3. Gen.G would then move to the regional qualifiers and would be seeded in the qualification match, by virtue of finishing with the most number of championship points amongst all competing teams. The team would win the match against T1 in a 3–0 sweep. In Worlds 2020, the team finished first in their group with a 5-1 record, qualifying for the quarterfinals, but lost to G2 Esports, 0–3. The following year, Gen.G ranked second in each of the Spring and Summer splits, but again failed to win an LCK championship, losing to then-defending World Champions and 2020 LCK Summer champions DWG KIA in the Spring final and to T1 in the Summer semifinals, both 0–3. The team still managed to qualify for the 2021 World Championship and finished with a 5–3 win-loss slate. Due to four-way tie between them, MAD Lions, LNG Esports, and Team Liquid, Gen.G had to play a best-of-one tiebreaker match against Team Liquid, which they won. Despite winning their quarterfinal match against Cloud9, 3–0, the team would be defeated by eventual champions Edward Gaming in the semifinals with a 2–3 scoreline.

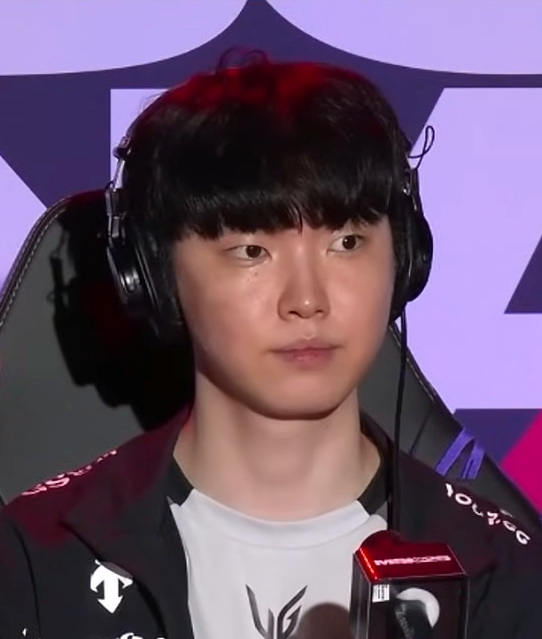
2026 LCK Season MVP Chovy made his first World Championship finals appearance after making the semifinals in 2022, 2024, and 2025.

In the 2021 offseason, Gen.G would sign four new players for the 2022 season, including mid-laner Jung "Chovy "Ji-hoon, transferring from Hanwha Life Esports. In the 2022 LCK Spring Split, the team finished with a 15–3 record, reaching the finals but were defeated by T1, 1–3. The Summer split would see an improvement, losing only a single match to finish with a 17–1 win-loss slate, and becoming the third team in LCK history to win 17 or more matches in a single split. In the playoffs, Gen.G defeated Liiv Sandbox in the semifinals, 3–1, and T1 in the finals, 3–0, to secure the organization's first LCK championship. Chovy earned Finals Most Valuable Player honors, while Ruler was also awarded the Summer split MVP award. Gen.G finished first in their group at the 2022 World Championship and defeated DWG KIA in the quarterfinals, 3–2, but lost to eventual champions DRX in the semifinals, 1–3. Ruler would leave the team during the 2022 offseason, signing with the LPL's JD Gaming, and was replaced by Kim "Peyz" Su-hwan for the 2023 campaign. The said year saw Gen.G win both LCK Spring and Summer championships, defeating T1 both times in the finals with a cumulative scoreline of 6–1, qualifying for both the 2023 Mid-Season Invitational, its first MSI as an organization, and the 2023 World Championship. In MSI 2023, the team would win its first bracket stage match against G2 Esports (3-1), but would lose to T1 (2–3) and got relegated to the lower bracket. Despite winning in a 3–0 sweep against Cloud9, the squad was defeated by Bilibili Gaming in an 0–3 sweep. Months later at Worlds, Gen.G went undefeated in the swiss stage, winning all three games, but was defeated again by Bilibili Gaming in the quarterfinals with a 2–3 scoreline, nearly pulling off a reverse sweep after facing a 0–2 deficit.

Two new players joined Gen.G for the 2024 season: Top-laner Kim "Kiin" Gi-in and Jungler Kim "Canyon" Geon-bu, transferring from KT Rolster and DWG KIA, respectively. The team would win the 2024 LCK Spring split, finishing at first place in the regular season with a 17–1 win-loss record, and defeating T1 in the finals, 3–2, to win their fourth consecutive LCK championship and qualify for the 2024 Mid-Season Invitational. The team went on an undefeated run at MSI 2024, defeating Fnatic (3–0), Top Esports (3–2), and Bilibili Gaming twice in the upper bracket final and finals, both with 3–1 scorelines each, to win their first international title. In the Summer split, Gen.G's championship streak would break: despite another 17-1 regular season, they lost in the finals to Hanwha Life Esports, 2–3. The 2024 World Championship saw Gen.G win all three swiss stage matches and qualify for the quarterfinals, where they would beat FlyQuest after winning two consecutive games facing a 1–2 deficit. However, the team was defeated by eventual champions T1 in the semifinals, 1–3.

Gen.G winning the 2025 LCK championship.

The following season, Joo "Duro" Min-kyu signed with the team as its new support, transferring from BNK FearX. In the 2025 LCK Cup, Gen.G placed second in Group Elder and was seeded in the second playoff round. Despite losing to Hanwha Life Esports, 2–3, the squad won two consecutive matches in the lower bracket against Dplus KIA (3–2) and Nongshim RedForce (3–0), respectively. However, HLE would again beat Gen.G in a similar scoreline as their last match, failing to qualify for the 2025 First Stand Tournament. The first two rounds of the season saw the team go undefeated in the regular season, finishing with an 18–0 record to become only the second team in LCK history to complete a split completely undefeated. Resulting from this feat, the team was seeded in the first qualification match in Road to MSI against Hanwha Life Esports, who they would beat 3–2 to qualify for the 2025 Mid-Season Invitational. MSI 2025 would see another undefeated run by Gen.G, winning against G2 Esports, Anyone's Legend, and T1 twice - with a 3–2 scoreline both in the upper bracket final and the grand final, to clinch back-to-back MSI titles. They also became only the third team to successfully defend their MSI title after SK Telecom T1 in 2017 and Royal Never Give Up in 2022. On 23 July 2025, Gen.G would win its first Round 3-5 match of the season against Hanwha Life Esports to win 27 consecutive matches to set a new League of Legends Esports record and became the first team to qualify for the 2025 World Championship in the process. The team would go on to finish the regular season with a 29–1 win-loss slate, only losing to T1. In the playoffs, Gen.G suffered a 2–3 defeat to KT Rolster in the second round, but won two straight matches in the lower bracket against T1 (3–2) and KT Rolster (3–0) to qualify for the finals, where they would win against Hanwha Life Esports, 3–1, to win the 2025 LCK championship. During Worlds 2025, Gen.G had a 3–1 swiss stage record and qualified for quarterfinals, where they would again beat HLE with a 3–1 scoreline. However, the team would suffer an upset defeat to KT Rolster in the semifinals, 1–3.

Gen.G kept the same roster for the 2026 LCK season, where they would win the LCK Cup after going on a combined 8–0 in both the group stage and the playoffs, qualifying for the 2026 First Stand Tournament, its first appearance at the said event. The team went 2–0 to qualify for the semifinals, but would suffer an upset 0–3 defeat to G2 Esports. The team placed third in the first two rounds of the season with a 14–4 record, but failed to qualify for the 2026 Mid-Season Invitational after losing to T1 in the final qualifying match, 2–3.. In the final two rounds, the squad finished the regular season with a 19–7 record and went undefeated in the playoffs, winning against KT Rolster (3–0) and Hanwha Life Esports twice with 3–1 scorelines each in both the upper bracket final and final to secure back-to-back LCK championships and the first seed at the 2026 World Championship. Gen.G went undefeated in the swiss stage, winning against Invictus Gaming, Hanwha Life Esports, and LYON, to clinch a spot in the knockout stage. In rematches of their 2-0 and 0-0 matchups, Gen.G would beat LYON in the quarterfinals with a 3-0 sweep, and would also beat Invictus Gaming with a similar scoreline - qualifying for their first League of Legends World Championship final since 2017 and the first under the Gen.G banner.

Gen.G's route to the final
Round	Opponent	Result
Swiss round 1	Invictus Gaming	1–0
Swiss round 2	Hanwha Life Esports	1–0
Swiss round 3	LYON	2–1
Quarterfinals	LYON	3–0
Semifinals	Invictus Gaming	3–0

=== Bilibili Gaming ===
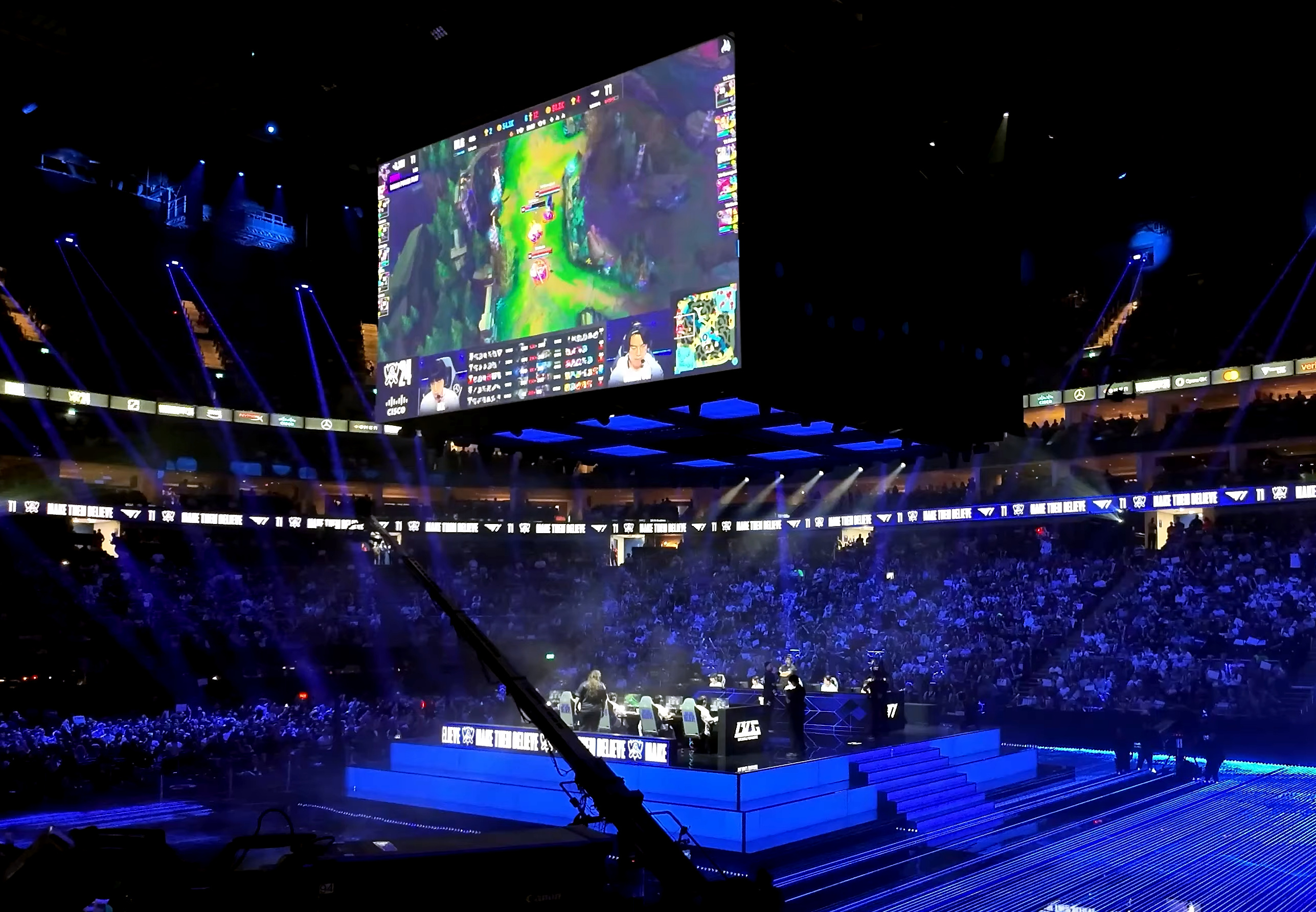
Bilibili Gaming played in the 2024 World Championship final.

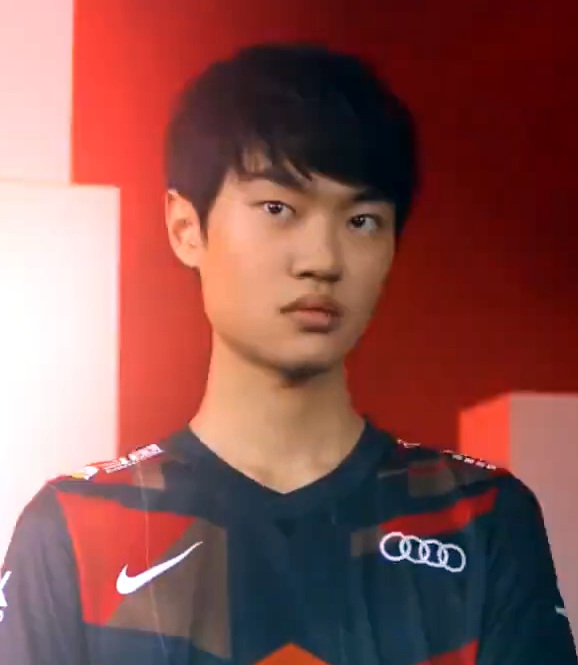
Knight made his second World Championship final in three years alongside three players.

Since losing the 2024 League of Legends World Championship final, Bilibili Gaming has remained one of the top-performing teams in the League of Legends Pro League (LPL). Weeks after the 2024 final, jungler Peng "Xun" Lixun departed the team and transferred to JD Gaming for the 2025 campaign. However, the team did not have a permanent replacement for him, as it signed three junglers throughout the year due to performance issues: Yan "Wei" Yangwei, Yang "Beichuan" Ling, and Zhao "Shadow" Zhiqiang, the latter of which was a former League of Legends European Championship (LEC) player who played for MAD Lions. In the first split of the season, BLG finished second in its group with a 2–1 record, qualifying for the playoffs. After defeating Weibo Gaming in the first round of the lower bracket, 3–1, the squad also won against TT Gaming in the next round with a similar scoreline. BLG would then lose to Top Esports in the third round, thus failing to qualify for the 2025 First Stand Tournament. Split 2 of the 2025 season saw BLG again finishing second in its group with a 5–1 win-loss slate, qualifying for Group Ascend in the rumble stage. The team would finish fourth in the group, winning 12 games to qualify for the playoffs. BLG would secure two 3–0 sweeps in its first two playoff matches against Invictus Gaming and Top Esports, respectively, but would lose in the upper bracket final against Anyone's Legend, 2–3, and was sent down to the lower bracket. The squad would win the lower bracket final with a 3–1 scoreline against Invictus Gaming and qualified for the 2025 Mid-Season Invitational, but would again lose to Anyone's Legend in the split finals, 1–3.

During MSI 2025, BLG won its first match against Movistar KOI, 3–1, but was defeated by T1 in the second round in a 0–3 sweep, and was relegated to the lower bracket. Despite winning a nailbiting 3–2 match against FlyQuest, the team suffered another 0–3 defeat in the tournament against Anyone's Legend in the lower bracket semifinal.. In the third split of the season, BLG finished third in Group Ascend with a 10–4 record, and went undefeated in the playoffs with wins against JD Gaming (3–2), Invictus Gaming (3–1), and Top Esports twice - both with 3–2 scorelines in the upper bracket final and final, respectively, to win the LPL championship and qualify for the 2025 World Championship. Mid-laner Zhuo "knight" Ding earned Finals Most Valuable Player honors. BLG lost its first swiss stage match of Worlds 2025 to 100 Thieves, but would win its next match against Fnatic. However, the team would fall to 1–2 following another defeat to G2 Esports. They would win against Vivo Keyd Stars to improve its record to 2–2, but would lose to Top Esports, 2–1, failing to qualify for the playoffs.

Viper made his second World Championship finals appearance after winning his maiden World Championship with Edward Gaming in 2021.

Elk departed BLG and transferred to Weibo Gaming during the 2025 offseason. ADC Park "Viper" Do-hyeon was announced as his replacment for the 2026 season on 1 December 2025, transferring from Hanwha Life Esports. On the same day, BLG also announced that Xun would return as the team's jungler, transferring from JD Gaming. The squad finished second to Anyone's Legend in Group Ascend with a 6–4 win-loss record, qualifying for the playoffs. BLG would win its first two playoff matches, scoring two 3–0 sweeps against Ninjas in Pyjamas and Weibo Gaming, respectively, before winning against JD Gaming in both the upper bracket final (3–2) and final (3–1) to win the first split and qualify for the 2026 First Stand Tournament. During First Stand, the team went undefeated in their group, beating BNK FearX, 3–2, and G2 Esports, 3–0 to qualify for the semifinals. BLG had a combined 6–1 win-loss slate across two playoff games against JD Gaming in the semifinals, 3–0, and G2 Esports in the finals, 3–1 - winning its first international title as an organization. The following split, BLG topped Group Ascend, winning 12 out of 14 games to qualify for the playoffs. Despite losing to Team WE in an upset defeat in the first round, the team won five consecutive matches in the lower bracket en route to winning the split title, and qualified for the 2026 Mid-Season Invitational. BLG won its first three matches at MSI 2026, winning against T1, LYON, and Hanwha Life Esports, to qualify for the finals. However, despite BLG being at match point with a 2–1 series lead, HLE would win two consecutive games to avenge its defeat to BLG and win its first MSI title. The team went on another 12–2 regular season in the third split, topping Group Ascend and was seeded in the second round of the playoffs. After winning against Top Esports and Anyone's Legend in the second round and upper bracket final, respectively, BLG qualified for the split finals, and subsequently qualified for the 2026 World Championship via championship points accumulated throughout the season. However, the team would suffer a 1–3 defeat to Anyone's Legend in the finals.

BLG lost its first Swiss stage match to Movistar KOI but improved its record to 2–1 after winning against Team Liquid Alienware and Karmine Corp. Despite falling to 2–2 after losing to Top Esports, BLG would secure an upset victory over Hanwha Life Esports to clinch the final spot in the playoffs. In the quarterfinals, the team defeated Dplus KIA, 3–0, and secured victory against defending champions T1 with a 3–1 scoreline to qualify for its second League of Legends World Championship final, ending T1's undefeated best-of-5 streak against LPL teams at Worlds.

BLG's route to the final
Round	Opponent	Result
Swiss round 1	Movistar KOI	0–1
Swiss round 2	Team Liquid Alienware	1–0
Swiss round 3	Karmine Corp	1–0
Swiss round 4	Top Esports	1–2
Swiss round 5	Hanwha Life Esports	2–0
Quarterfinals	Dplus KIA	3–0
Semifinals	T1	3–1

== Background ==
Gen.G and Bilibili Gaming were representatives of the LCK and LPL, respectively. This series marked the fifth time both teams met in a best-of-five series during an international League of Legends competition, with the first two series being the lower bracket semifinals of the 2023 Mid-Season Invitational in London, England, and the 2023 World Championship in South Korea, both were won by Bilibili Gaming with scores of 3–0 and 3–2, respectively. The most recent series were the upper bracket finals and grand finals of the 2024 Mid-Season Invitational in Chengdu, China, both of which were won by Gen.G by a 3–1 score in both matches. This was Gen.G's first Worlds Finals appearance under its current name, and its third overall - having appeared twice in 2016 and 2017 as Samsung Galaxy, winning the latter tournament. Bilibili Gaming also made its second World Finals after losing the 2024 final against T1, whom they beat in the 2026 semifinals. Four out of five players on Bilibili Gaming made their second finals appearance, while this was the debut for three players on Gen.G. Three players made their third Worlds finals appearance: Park "Ruler" Jae-hyuk, who was part of Samsung Galaxy during its 2016 finals run and 2017 championship campaign, Chen "Bin" Zebin, who made his first appearance during the 2020 final in Shanghai as part of Suning (now known as Weibo Gaming) prior to his 2024 appearance with Bilibili Gaming, and Kim "Canyon" Geon-bu, who defeated Bin in the 2020 final with DAMWON Gaming and appeared again in 2021. Bin also became the first Chinese player in League of Legends history to qualify for three World Championship finals, surpassing Jian "Uzi" Zihao's record of two appearances.

=== Team line-ups ===
Gen.G

2026 Gen.G League of Legends World Championship roster
Players
Coaches

Role	Handle	Name	Nationality
Top	Kiin	Kim Gi-in	South Korea
Jungle	Canyon	Kim Geon-bu	South Korea
Mid	Chovy	Jung Ji-hun	South Korea
Bot	Ruler	Park Jae-hyuk	South Korea
Support	Duro	Joo Min-kyu	South Korea

Head coach

- Ryu "Ryu" Sang-wook

Assistant coach(es)

- Kim "Lyn" Da-bin
- Park "Nova" Chan-ho

Legend:
- (I) Inactive
- (S) Suspended
- Substitute
- (injured) Injury / Illness

Bilibili Gaming

2026 Bilibili Gaming League of Legends World Championship roster
Players
Coaches

Role	Handle	Name	Nationality
Top	Bin	Chen Zebin	China
Jungle	Xun	Peng Lixun	China
Mid	Knight	Zhuo Ding	China
Bot	Viper	Park Do-hyeon	South Korea
Support	ON	Luo Wenjun	China

Head coach

- Yang "Daeny" Dae-in

Assistant coach(es)

- Li "Chieh" Chieh
- Zhuang "zyb" Yibin
- Nam "Ben" Dong-hyun

Legend:
- (I) Inactive
- (S) Suspended
- Substitute
- (injured) Injury / Illness

== Opening ceremony ==
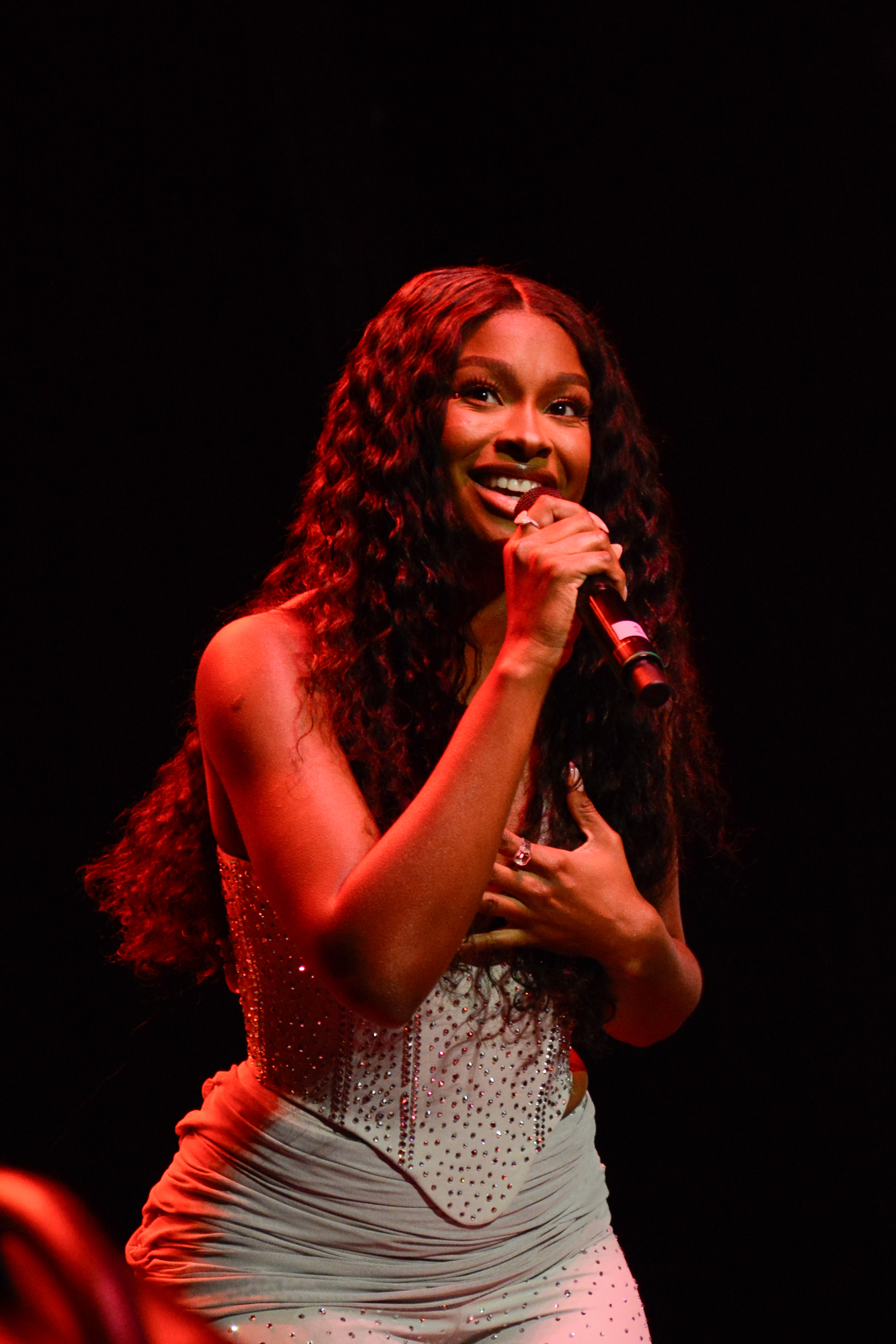
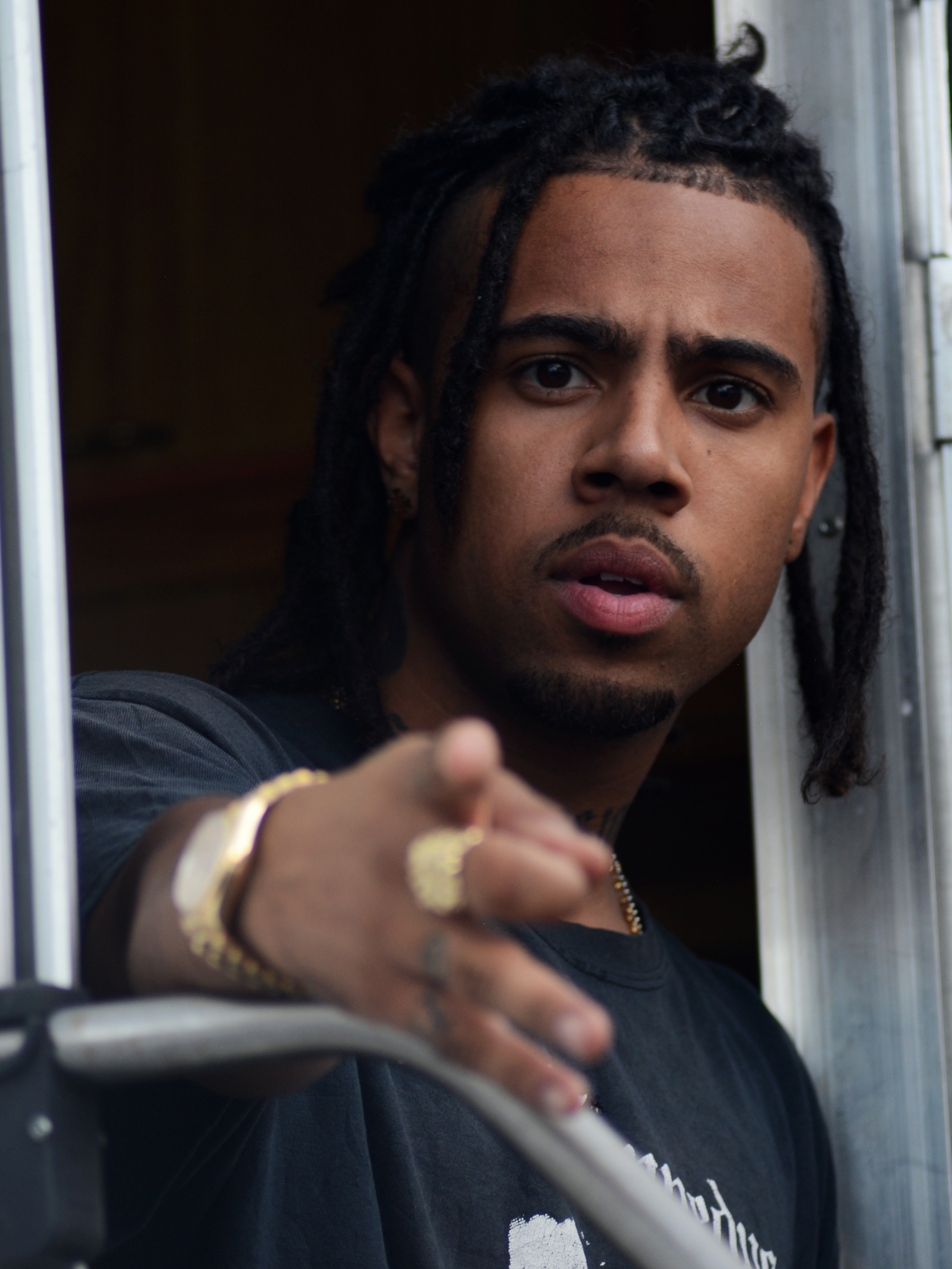
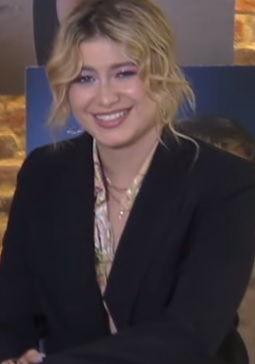
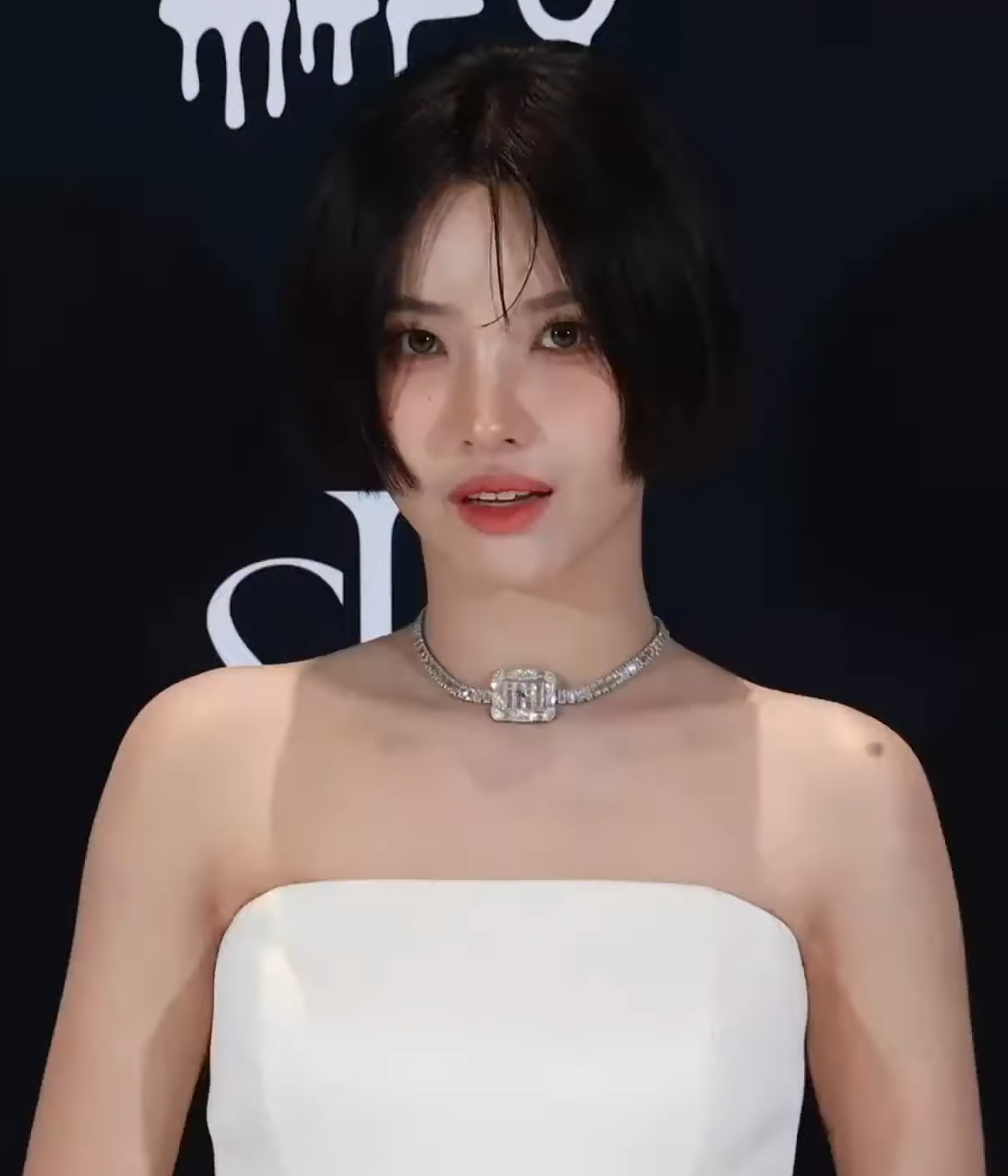
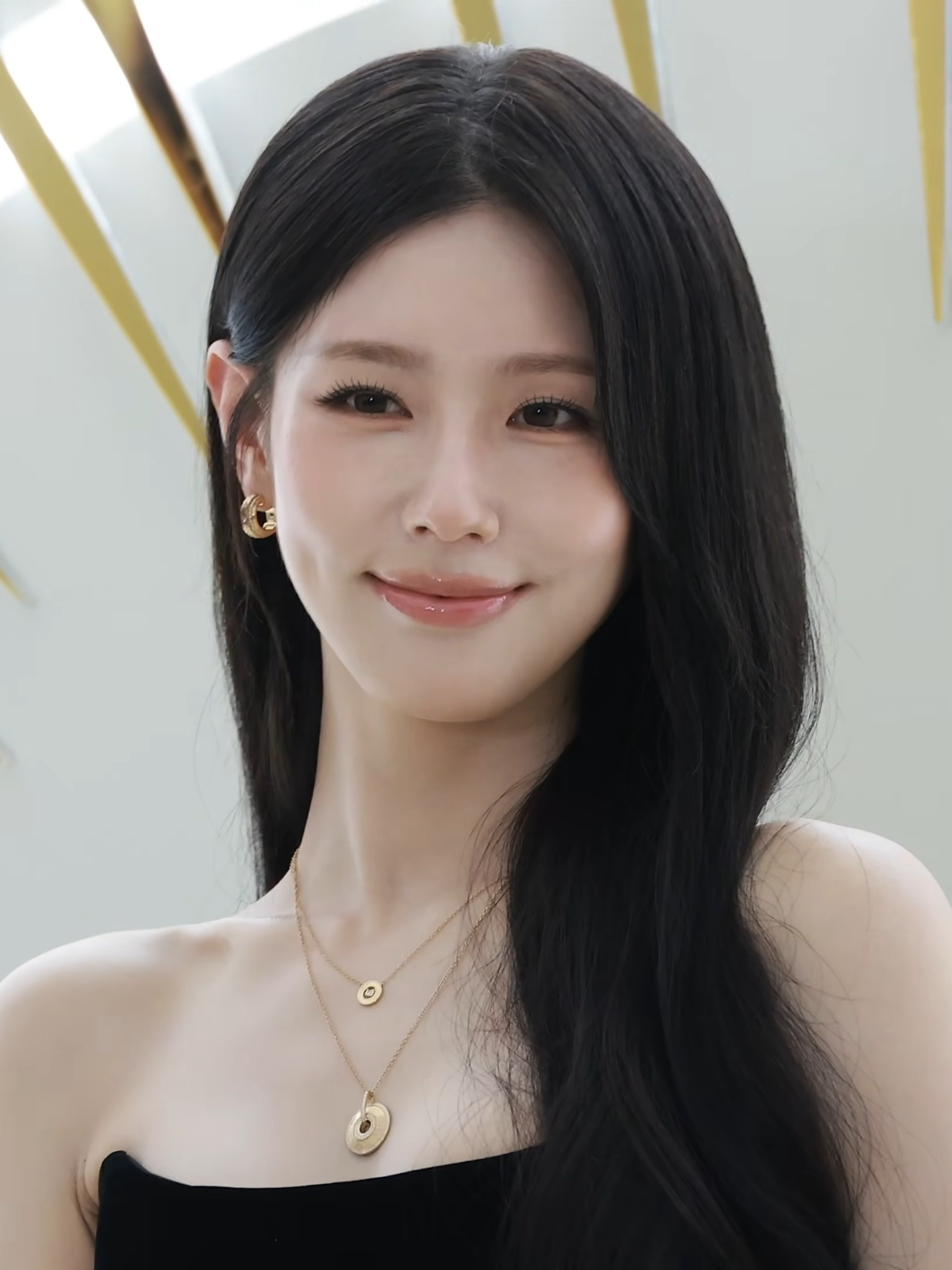
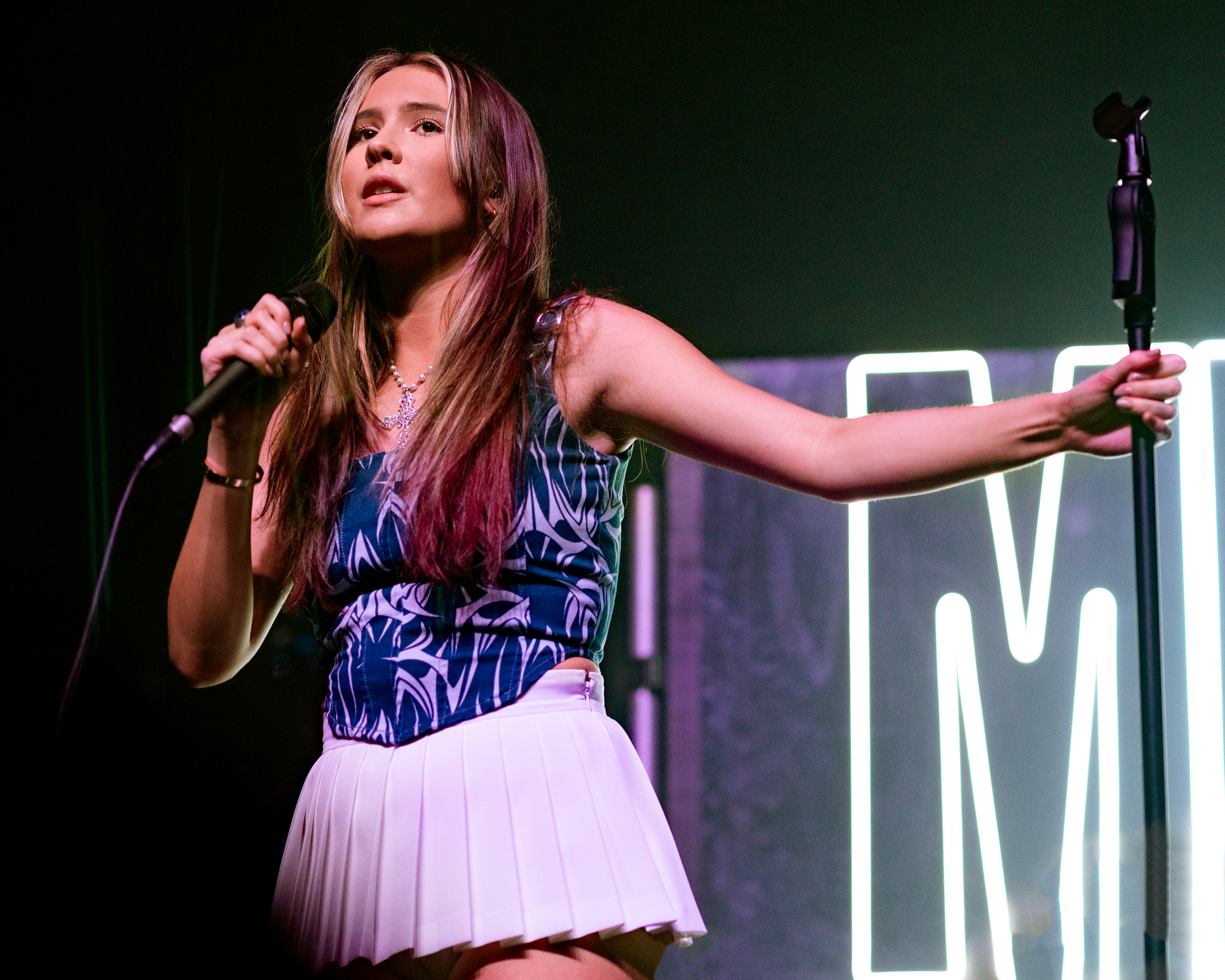
True Damage and K/DA (Coco Jones, Vic Mensa, Sofía Reyes, Jeon So-yeon, Cho Mi-yeon, Sophie Powers, and Mimi Webb) all performed at the final.

Before the finals, an opening ceremony (known as the Opening Ceremony presented by Mastercard for sponsorship reasons) took place at 14:00 EST (19:00 UTC), featuring K/DA and True Damage. This was both groups' second World Championship finals performance since the 2020 and 2019 editions, respectively. The ceremony began with a medley of K/DA songs performed as its members were revealed in order: "More" performed by Korean rapper Jeon So-yeon of I-dle, "The Baddest" performed by Soyeon and English singer-songwriter Mimi Webb, "Villain" performed by Canadian singer-songwriter Sophie Powers, and "Pop/Stars" performed by Korean singer Cho Mi-yeon of I-dle alongside all members. Three of the four songs are part of the group's All Out extended play (EP). The group then performs "Firestarter" from its namesake and most recent extended play.

24 drummers slowly made their way onto the stage, forming a drumline as the Summoner's Cup was unveiled from underneath the stage. True Damage then performs the tournament's official anthem, "Know My Name", with its members being unveiled in order: American singer Coco Jones and Mexican singer and songwriter Sofía Reyes, Korean rapper Jeon So-yeon of I-dle, and American singer Vic Mensa. Towards the final chorus of the song, players from Gen.G and Bilibili Gaming walked onto the stage and were introduced according to their role matchups as the ceremony concluded.

The stage for the World Championship final was a single oval stage with a 360-degree LED overhead, with a 180-degree inner LED overhead that was brought down for K/DA's performance of "Firestarter".

== Series ==
=== Game 1 ===
In the first wave of bans, Gen.G opted to ban Nocturne, Orianna, and Vi, while Bilibili Gaming chose to ban Qiyana, Cassiopeia, and Lulu. For the last four bans, Gen.G chose Jax & Camille, while Bilibili Gaming banned Ezreal & Seraphine.

Game 1 Team Compositions
Role	GEN	BLG
Top	Olaf	K'Sante
Jungle	Lee Sin	Jarvan IV
Middle	Syndra	Locke
ADC	Corki	Kalista
Support	Nami	Renata Glasc

Game 1 ended with a game time of 38 minutes and 59 seconds and a kill scoreline of 19 to 4 in favor of Gen.G to win the first game of the finals. BLG's defeat broke a 76-game winning streak of teams that secure dragon soul and at least one elder dragon in international League of Legends competitions.

Game 1		Gen.G	19	–	4	Bilibili Gaming	New York City, United States
	38:59	GEN leads series 1–0					Barclays Center
		K/D/A: 19/4/61; Gold: 80.0K; Turrets: 9 Drakes: 0 Elder Dragons: 1 Barons: 3 Rift Heralds: 0 Voidgrubs: 2	Game Stats			K/D/A: 4/19/12; Gold: 66.0K; Turrets: 3 Drakes: 4 Elder Dragons: 1 Barons: 0 Rift Heralds: 1 Voidgrubs: 1	

=== Game 2 ===
In the first wave of bans, Gen.G opted to once again ban Nocturne, this time alongside Qiyana and Nautilus, while Bilibili Gaming chose to ban Jayce, Vi, and Galio. For the last four bans, Gen.G chose Lulu & Akali, while Bilibili Gaming banned Renekton & Viktor.

Game 2 Team Compositions
Role	GEN	BLG
Top	Vayne	Gnar
Jungle	Cho'Gath	Naafiri
Middle	Orianna	Cassiopeia
ADC	Ezreal	Ziggs
Support	Karma	Camille

Game 2 ended with a game time of 53 minutes and 16 seconds and a kill scoreline of 19 to 14 in favor of BLG to even the series at one game apiece. The game's duration became the third-longest World Championship finals game in tournament history, only behind the third game (71 minutes and 20 seconds) and first game (54 minutes and 41 seconds) of the 2016 World Championship finals between SK Telecom T1 and Samsung Galaxy. BLG's Park "Viper" Do-heyon also had a 1,776 damage per minute in Game 2, reaching second in the all-time most damage per minute in international competitions - only behind Zachary "Sneaky" Scuderi's 1,781 damage per minute achieved during the first game of Cloud9's quarterfinal match at the 2018 World Championship against Team WE.

Game 2		Gen.G	14	–	19	Bilibili Gaming	New York City, United States
	53:16	Series tied 1–1					Barclays Center
		K/D/A: 14/19/27; Gold: 94.2K; Turrets: 4 Drakes: 3 Elder Dragons: 1 Barons: 1 Rift Heralds: 1 Voidgrubs: 1	Game Stats			K/D/A: 19/14/50; Gold: 99.5K; Turrets: 11; Drakes: 4 Elder Dragons: 0 Barons: 3 Rift Heralds: 0 Voidgrubs: 2	

=== Game 3 ===
In the first wave of bans, Gen.G opted to ban Nautilus, Renekton, and Seraphine, while Bilibili Gaming chooses to ban Qiyana, Jayce, and Lulu. For the last four bans, Gen.G chose Kai'Sa & Sivir, while Bilibili Gaming banned Xayah & Poppy.

Game 3 Team Compositions
Role	GEN	BLG
Top	Ambessa	Jax
Jungle	Wukong	Vi
Middle	Annie	Viktor
ADC	Jhin	Taliyah
Support	Rakan	Alistar

Game 3 ended with a game time of 37 minutes and 39 seconds and a kill scoreline of 20 to 8 in favor of BLG to reach match point, one win away from winning the World Championship.

Game 3		Gen.G	8	–	20	Bilibili Gaming	New York City, United States
	37:39	BLG leads series 2–1					Barclays Center
		K/D/A: 8/20/16; Gold: 65.7K; Turrets: 4 Drakes: 2 Elder Dragons: 0 Barons: 0 Rift Heralds: 1 Voidgrubs: 0	Game Stats			K/D/A: 20/8/60; Gold: 74.0K; Turrets: 10; Drakes: 4 Elder Dragons: 0 Barons: 1 Rift Heralds: 0 Voidgrubs: 3	

=== Game 4 ===
In the first wave of bans, Gen.G opted to ban Nautilus, Skarner, and Kindred, while Bilibili Gaming once again chose to ban Qiyana and Jayce, this time with Seraphine. For the last four bans, Gen.G chose Renekton & Galio, while Bilibili Gaming banned Sylas & Rumble.

Game 4 Team Compositions
Role	BLG	GEN
Top	Gwen	Aurora
Jungle	Nocturne	Pantheon
Middle	Twisted Fate	Akali
ADC	Yunara	Xayah
Support	Neeko	Lulu

Game 4 ended with a game time of 42 minutes and 58 seconds and a kill scoreline of 21 to 11 in favor of BLG to win its first League of Legends World Championship title and its second international title.

Game 4		Bilibili Gaming	21	–	11	Gen.G	New York City, United States
	42:58	BLG wins series 3–1					Barclays Center
		K/D/A: 11/21/25; Gold: 79.8K; Turrets: 5 Drakes: 4 Elder Dragons: 0 Barons: 1 Rift Heralds: 0 Voidgrubs: 3	Game Stats			K/D/A: 21/11/59; Gold: 89.7K; Turrets: 10; Drakes: 3 Elder Dragons: 0 Barons: 2 Rift Heralds: 1 Voidgrubs: 0	

== Post-series ==
BLG's victory marked the first World Championship for the LPL since 2021, becoming the fourth team from the league to do so after Invictus Gaming, FunPlus Phoenix, and Edward Gaming. With their win against Gen.G, BLG swept through all four LCK representatives to claim the trophy. The tournament had a base prize pool of US$5 million. Of this, the winners, BLG, received 20% ($1,000,000) of the pool. For coming second, Gen.G was rewarded 16% ($800,000).

As with previous world champions, BLG is expected to work directly with Riot Games' visual department to release skins for the champions of their choosing. The players could choose any champion they've played over the whole tournament. Additionally, Knight is expected to receive a second skin due to being chosen as the MVP.

Two days after the final, BLG were in attendance at a Brooklyn Nets game against the Philadelphia 76ers and were recognized. The Nets also gave all players custom jerseys before the game began.

== Broadcasting ==
The English broadcast was cast by Clayton "CaptainFlowers" Raines and Sam "Kobe" Hartman-Kenzler of the League Championship Series, and Andrew "Vedius" Day of the League of Legends EMEA Championship. It was the third Worlds Finals cast for CaptainFlowers, having worked on the 2018 and 2022 finals. It was also Kobe's fifth finals cast in six years, having been on the broadcast for the 2021, 2022, 2024, and 2025 finals previously, and Vedius' fourth finals cast after the 2020, 2021, and 2024 editions.

Broadcasts in Chinese were cast by Wang "Wang Duoduo" Qianyuan, Wang "Remember" Chi-te, Qian "Mille" Chen, Feng "Rita" Yu, and Ke "957" Changyu of the League of Legends Pro League, with Chinese gymnast and three-time 2024 Summer Olympics medalist Zhang Boheng joining them. Meanwhile, the Korean cast was led by Chun "Caster Jun" Yong-jun, Lee "CloudTemplar" Hyun-woo, and Go "Ggoggo" Su-jin of the League of Legends Champions Korea.

Livestreaming of the series was primarily be held on the official LoL Esports website, the Riot Games Twitch channel, and the LoL Esports YouTube and TikTok channels for the English broadcast. In China and South Korea, the finals were streamed on select platforms, while official broadcasts in multiple languages was available on Twitch, YouTube, and TikTok. Several streaming personalities co-streamed the finals, both remotely and in-person. Across certain countries, viewing parties are set in multiple locations.
