= 2021 League of Legends World Championship final =

League of Legends esports series

2021 League of Legends World Championship Final
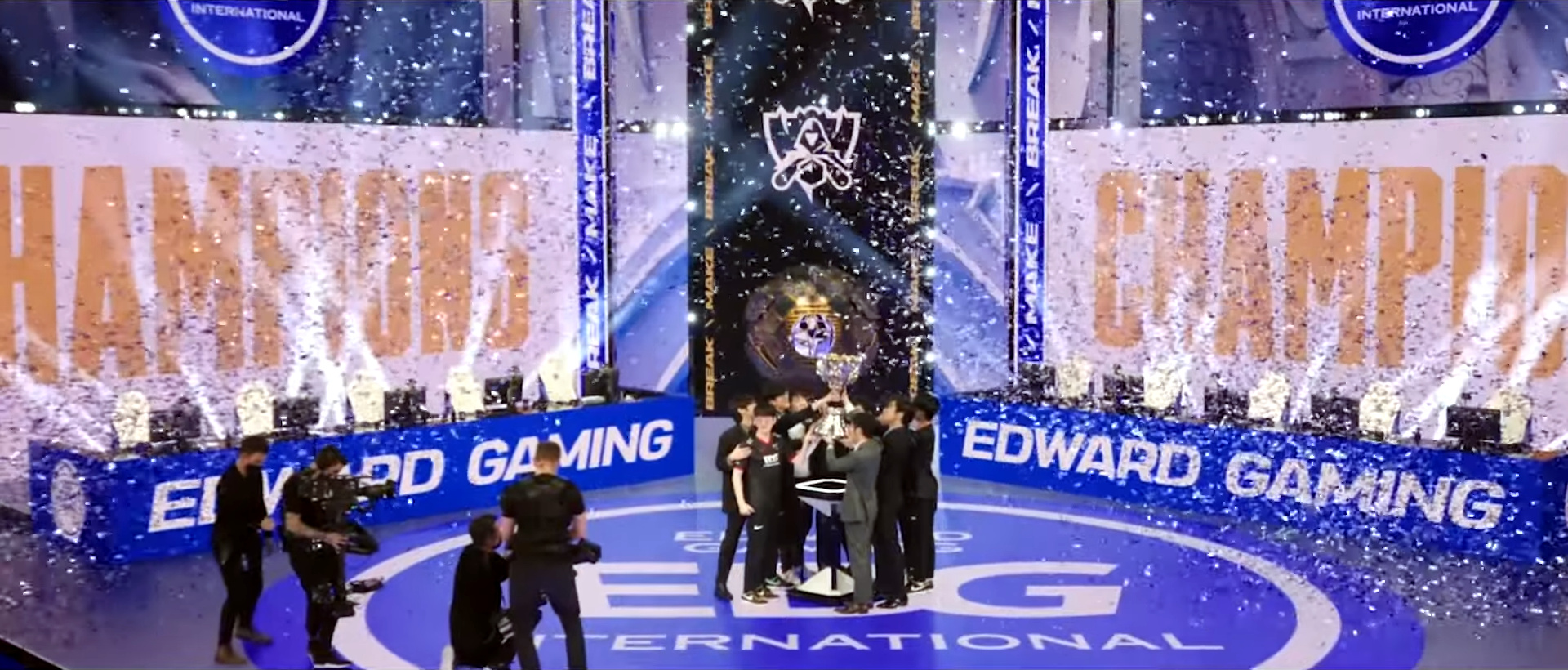
- A scene at the Laugardalshöll after the match.
EDG	DK
3	2
- Date: 6 November 2021
- Venue: Laugardalshöll, Reykjavík
- Attendance: 0 (Note: Due to the COVID-19 pandemic, the tournament was held behind closed doors.)
- MVP: Lee "Scout" Ye-chan

Live Broadcast
- Announcers: English; Max "Atlus" Anderson; Andrew "Vedius" Day; Sam "Kobe" Hartman-Kenzler
- Viewers: 4 million (peak excluding China)

The 2021 League of Legends World Championship Final was a League of Legends (LoL) esports series between DWG KIA and Edward Gaming on 6 November 2021 at the Laugardalshöll in Reykjavík, Iceland, marking the eleventh final of a LoL World Championship.

It was the second straight final for DWG KIA, who entered the series as defending champions, having won the 2020 edition. The team was one of four Korean representatives from the League of Legends Champions Korea (LCK), the others being Gen.G, T1, and Hanwha Life Esports. Edward Gaming were one of four Chinese representatives from the League of Legends Pro League (LPL) alongside FunPlus Phoenix, 2021 Mid-Season Invitational champions Royal Never Give Up, and LNG Esports.

The series was a best of five and was the first to be played with no audience due to the COVID-19 pandemic in Iceland, but was viewed by four (4) million peak viewers, which was the highest in tournament history at the time. The series ended 3–2 in favor of EDG, who mounted a comeback of two consecutive victories after facing a 1–2 series deficit after three games.

EDG's midlaner Lee "Scout" Ye-chan earned Most Valuable Player honors, becoming the first midlaner since Lee "Faker" Sang-hyeok, who won Finals MVP in 2016, to win the award. The series marked the first world championship for EDG — its second international title since winning the 2015 Mid-Season Invitational.

== Background ==
A simplified representation of Summoner's Rift. The yellow paths are the "lanes" down which minions march; blue and red dots represent turrets. The fountains are the dark areas within each base, and are beside each Nexus. The dotted black line indicates the river.

League of Legends is a 2009 multiplayer online battle arena (MOBA) video game developed by Riot Games. Each year, Riot hosts a World Championship (Worlds) featuring the most successful teams globally throughout the year-long season. The 2021 Worlds, the eleventh edition of the World Championship, as with its predecessors, was played on the map "Summoner's Rift", a play-field featuring three lanes defined by their location—top, middle, and bottom—and two jungle quadrants, mirrored diagonally down a neutral zone known as the river. Summoner's Rift is played by ten players, five per team, through an isometric perspective as players control characters, known as "champions", split between five roles respective on their location on the map: top, jungle, middle, attack damage carry, and support. The latter two are both played in the bottom lane. (Note: The roles in League of Legends are often referred to in the community as "top laner", "jungler", "midlaner", "ADC" (Attack Damage Carry), and "support". The latter two are conjunctively known as "botlaners".) The two teams are referred to as red and blue. The red team spawns in the top right and the blue team spawns in the bottom left.

In professional play, players choose their champions during champion select. This consists of four phases: banning phase and picking phase, both of which occur twice. The blue team starts, banning one champion at their discretion. This is then interchanged between the teams until six total champions have been banned, three per team. Blue side then picks their first champion, followed by red side selecting two champions before blue side completes the first phase of picking and banning by also locking in two champions. The teams then begin the second banning phase, starting with red side. The teams interchange until four additional champions have been banned, for a total of ten. Red side also initiates the second picking phase by selecting one champion. Blue side then responds by picking two champions before red side finalises the process by locking in the final champion.

The ultimate goal of the game is to destroy the enemy team's Nexus. This is accomplished through leveling up and purchasing items with gold, the in-game currency. In the lanes there are turrets and inhibitors, defensive objectives for the opposing team to destroy (at least one must be destroyed for the Nexus to take damage), as well as a constant stream of minions that can be killed for gold and experience. Similarly, the jungle contains monsters that reward gold and experience upon defeating them. In the river, there are two major neutral objectives. The Rift Herald spawns on the top side of the river and on death, rewards the team with an active item that respawns the Rift Herald, dealing significant damage to the opposing team's defensive structures. At 20 minutes in, the Rift Herald disappears and is replaced by Baron Nashor. Baron Nashor provides the team that kills it with substantial buffs. On the bottom side of the map, dragons spawn. Random elemental dragons that provide small permanent buffs to the acquiring team continue to spawn until 35 minutes in, at which point the Elder Dragon will spawn that upon being slain, provides the team with a powerful temporary buff. Gold and experience points are also obtained through killing these neutral monsters.

== Impact of the COVID-19 pandemic ==
The 2021 edition of the World Championship was the second to be affected by the COVID-19 pandemic, with the 2020 tournament being held in an isolation bubble in Shanghai, China. On 16 June 2021, Riot Games announced the cities of Shanghai, Qingdao, Wuhan, Chengdu, and Shenzhen as the host cities for the 2021 iteration of the event, with the finals taking place in Shenzhen. However, due to travel complications brought about by the pandemic in mainland China, Reykjavík, Iceland (where the 2021 Mid-Season Invitational had been hosted) was named as the new host city for the event.

== Route to the final ==
=== DK ===
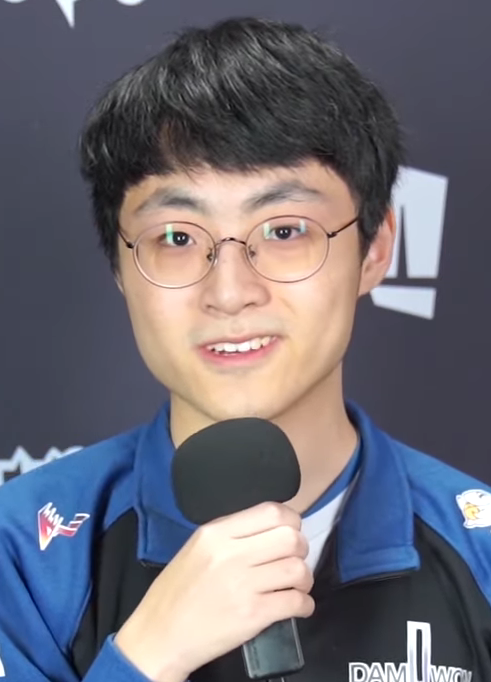
Showmaker was the 2020 LCK Summer MVP.

In the 2018 season, DWG KIA (then known as DAMWON Gaming) were part of the League of Legends Champions Korea's (LCK) Challengers League (then known as Challengers Korea), in which they would win that year's Summer Split — losing only a single series to Team BattleComics. This result automatically qualified them to the Spring Promotion, where two teams would be promoted to the LCK for the 2019 competitive season. DWG KIA would win all matches during the promotion tournament, with the first being a 2–0 win against BBQ Olivers and a 3–1 series victory over Team BattleComics in the qualification match — sending the team to its first LCK appearance. Prior to their qualification for the LCK, the team already had midlaner Heo "ShowMaker" Su and support Cho "BeryL" Geon-hee, who were the longest-tenured members of the team when it was then known as "Mirage Gaming," prior to its acquisition by computer manufacturer Damwon on 28 May 2017. Jungler Kim "Canyon" Geon-bu was also part of the team prior to the promotion tournament, while toplaner Jang "Nuguri" Ha-gwon joined the squad months after the acquisition, transferring from I Gaming Star. Canyon would make his professional debut during the 2018 LoL KeSPA Cup.

The following year, DAMWON Gaming made its maiden LCK season, where they would finish the Spring Split with an 11–7 win-loss slate, including wins against 2018 Summer Split champions KT Rolster and Gen.G, who were then known as Samsung Galaxy when it won the 2017 League of Legends World Championship. In their first playoff appearance, the team won its first series against SANDBOX Gaming, before losing to Kingzone DragonX to place 4th in the standings. Despite not qualifying for the 2019 Mid-Season Invitational, DAMWON Gaming earned a spot in Rift Rivals 2019, where the LCK won the tournament after defeating the LPL in the playoff stage. The team had a rough start to the Summer Split, losing its first two matches. However, it would only lose three more while winning the rest of their matches — finishing the regular season with a 13–5 record tying with Griffin, but would be the second seed as Griffin was able to win one series over DAMWON during the first week. The team would start in the third round of Summer Playoffs where one win to see the team qualify for the 2019 League of Legends World Championship. However, they would lose against SK Telecom T1, 0–3, but still had a chance to qualify through the Regional Qualifier. As DAMWON had the highest amount of championship points among the four participating teams, they would automatically be seeded in the qualification match, where they would win against Kingzone DragonX, 3–2 to qualify for their first-ever World Championship — becoming the first team to do so after being promoted to the LCK in the same year. In their world championship debut, the team would begin in the play-in stage where they would win all their double robin games against Royal Youth and Flamengo eSports, qualifying them for the group stage where they would be grouped in Group D with defending champions Invictus Gaming, Team Liquid, and ahq Esports Club. DAMWON would finish the group stage with a 5–1 win-loss record, securing the first seed and playoff qualification in their maiden tournament appearance, but would lose to eventual finalists G2 Esports in the quarterfinals, 1–3.

DAMWON kept its roster for the 2020 LCK season, but would later sign ADC Jang "Ghost" Yong-jun from SANDBOX Gaming. The team would finish the regular season with a 9–9 slate, qualifying for playoffs. Despite their first round victory over KT Rolster, 2–1, the team would face a 2–3 defeat to DRX in the second round, but still managed to qualify for the 2020 Mid-Season Invitational, which was eventually cancelled due to the COVID-19 pandemic and was replaced by the 2020 Mid-Season Cup. In the tournament, they were grouped alongside T1, defending world champions FunPlus Phoenix, and Top Esports, and were not able to advance to the knockout stage. In the following split, DAMWON would have its best season in the LCK, finishing on top of the standings with a 16–2 win-loss record and winning its first domestic championship after a 3–0 series victory over DRX — effectively qualifying for the 2020 League of Legends World Championship. In the group stage, DAMWON was seeded into Group B alongside JD Gaming, PSG Talon, and Rogue, with the team only losing one game en route to a 5–1 record. In the quarterfinals, the team would beat DRX, 3–0, in a rematch of the LCK Summer Finals, before securing a 3–1 victory over 2019 finalists G2 Esports to advance to its first World Championship final. In the finals, DAMWON Gaming were victorious against Suning, 3–1, to clinch its first international title, with Canyon earning Finals MVP honors.

Prior to the 2021 season, the team was rebranded as DWG KIA after signing on a partnership with Kia Motors. Only one change was made to the roster that won the 2020 edition of Worlds, with toplaner Kim "Khan" Dong-ha, who was in his final playing season, replacing Nuguri following the latter's move to FunPlus Phoenix. DWG KIA continued its domestic dominance with a 16–2 win-loss record in the 2021 Spring Split and winning its second LCK title after victories against Hanwha Life Esports in the semifinals and Gen.G in the finals and qualify for the 2021 Mid-Season Invitational. In MSI 2021, the team was seeded into Group C alongside Cloud9, DetonatioN FocusMe, and Infinity Esports — finishing with a 5–1 record before qualifying for the knockout stage through the rumble stage. Having an 8–2 record, the squad would face MAD Lions in the semifinals and managed to emerge victorious, 3–2, but would eventually lose to Royal Never Give Up in the finals, also ending in five games. Despite losing in their first MSI finals appearance, DWG KIA continued its domestic dominance during the Summer Split, finishing with a 12–6 win-loss slate en route to a 3–1 victory over T1 to secure their third consecutive LCK championship and second-straight qualification to the World Championship. The squad was seeded into Group A with Cloud9, Rogue, and FunPlus Phoenix, where they would finish the group stage undefeated at 6–0. In the playoffs, DWG KIA secured a 3–0 sweep over MAD Lions in the quarterfinals before facing T1 in a rematch of the Summer Split Finals in the semifinal stage. The team would triumph over T1 after a nail-biting 3–2 series win to advance to their second consecutive League of Legends World Championship Final.

DK's route to the final
Round	Opponent	Result
Group Stage	FunPlus Phoenix	1–0
Group Stage	Rogue	1–0
Group Stage	Cloud9	1–0
Group Stage	FunPlus Phoenix	1–0
Group Stage	Rogue	1–0
Group Stage	Cloud9	1–0
Quarterfinals	MAD Lions	3–0
Semifinals	T1	3–2

=== EDG ===
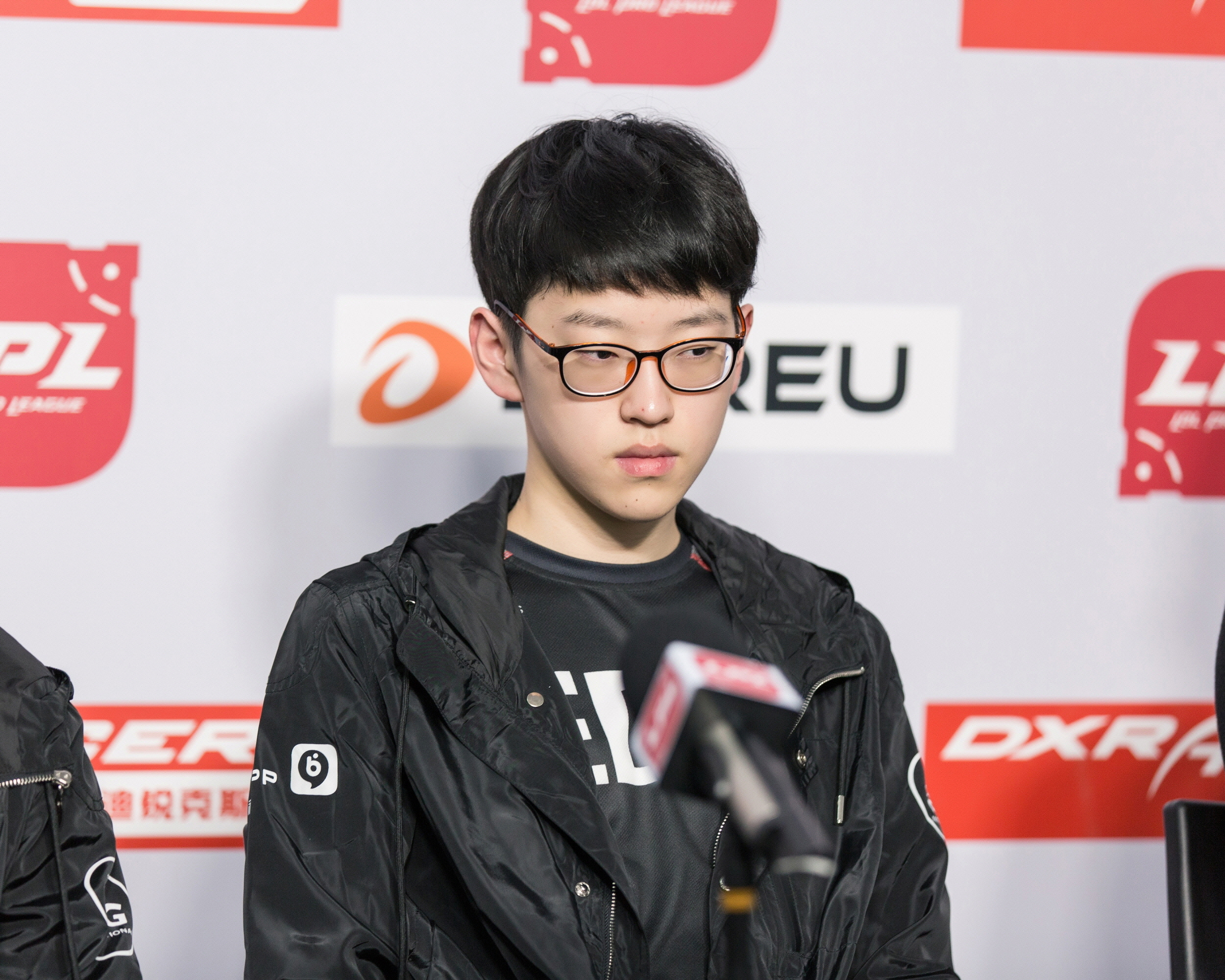
Scout during a press conference in February 2017.

Heading into the 2021 Worlds Final, EDG was in the midst of an international title drought since their last major international championship, that being the 2015 Mid-Season Invitational. Prior to the 2020s, EDG had won five League of Legends Pro League (LPL) titles — 2014 Spring and Summer, 2015 Spring, 2016 Summer, and 2017 Summer. Furthermore, the team was one of the consistent squads to qualify for the League of Legends World Championship in the 2010s, having qualified five consecutive times from 2014 to 2018. This streak was snapped in 2019 when the team failed to qualify for the tournament due to their placing during the 2019 LPL Summer Split, where they failed to earn enough championship points to qualify for the Regional Qualifiers. EDG were also not able to qualify for the 2020 League of Legends World Championship after another disappointing domestic season. As a result, the team underwent major roster changes for the 2021 LPL season. On 16 December 2020, toplaner Li "Flandre" Xuanjun and ADC Park "Viper" Do-hyeon both signed with the squad, transferring from LNG Esports and Hanwha Life Esports, respectively. The two new players joined jungler Zhao "Jiejie" Lijie, who was called up from EDG's Youth Team in April 2019, midlaner Lee "Scout Ye-chan, who joined EDG in March 2016, and support Tian "Meiko" Ye, who was the longest-tenured member on the team.

The newly revamped roster had a strong start to the 2021 Spring Split, winning their first eight matches en route to a 13–3 win-loss record, placing at second place behind defending MSI champions Royal Never Give Up, who finished the regular season at 14–2. In the playoffs, EDG began at the fourth round by virtue of being one of the top two teams, with their first opponent being Top Esports. The team would secure a 3–0 sweep but would lose to FunPlus Phoenix in the upper bracket finals, 2–3, relegating them to the lower bracket. EDG would again face a five-game defeat to eventual Spring Split champions RNG in the lower bracket finals. After the Spring Split, the Summer Split commenced. Here, EDG maintained their consistent form, winning their first seven matches, The team finished the regular season with a 12-4 slate, placing second once again with FunPlus Phoenix topping the standings at 13–3. Similar to the last split, EDG started their playoffs campaign in the fourth round as the second seed, where they lost to Team WE, 2–3, relegating them again to the lower bracket. The squad would win their next assignment against LNG Esports with a 3–1 scoreline, before beating Team WE in an upper bracket rematch in a nail-biting 3–2 win to advance to their first domestic final since the 2018 Spring Split. In the finals, EDG would secure a 3–1 victory over FunPlux Phoenix to win their first LPL championship since the 2017 Summer Split and qualification for the 2021 League of Legends World Championship.

EDG was seeded into Group B of the group stage alongside T1, 100 Thieves and DetonatioN FocusMe. Despite winning their first four matches, the team would lose its final two games to finish second with a 4–2 win-loss slate behind T1 at 5–1, qualifying for the quarterfinals. Having progressed into the knockout stage, EDG knocked off MSI 2021 champions Royal Never Give Up with a 3–2 scoreline in a rematch of the 2021 LPL Spring Split lower bracket finals, before beating Gen.G in another five-game series in the semifinals to advance to their first League of Legends World Championship Final.

EDG's route to the final
Round	Opponent	Result
Group Stage	100 Thieves	1–0
Group Stage	T1	1–0
Group Stage	DetonatioN FocusMe	1–0
Group Stage	DetonatioN FocusMe	1–0
Group Stage	T1	0–1
Group Stage	100 Thieves	1–0
Quarterfinals	Royal Never Give Up	3–2
Semifinals	Gen.G	3–2

== Background and pre-series ==
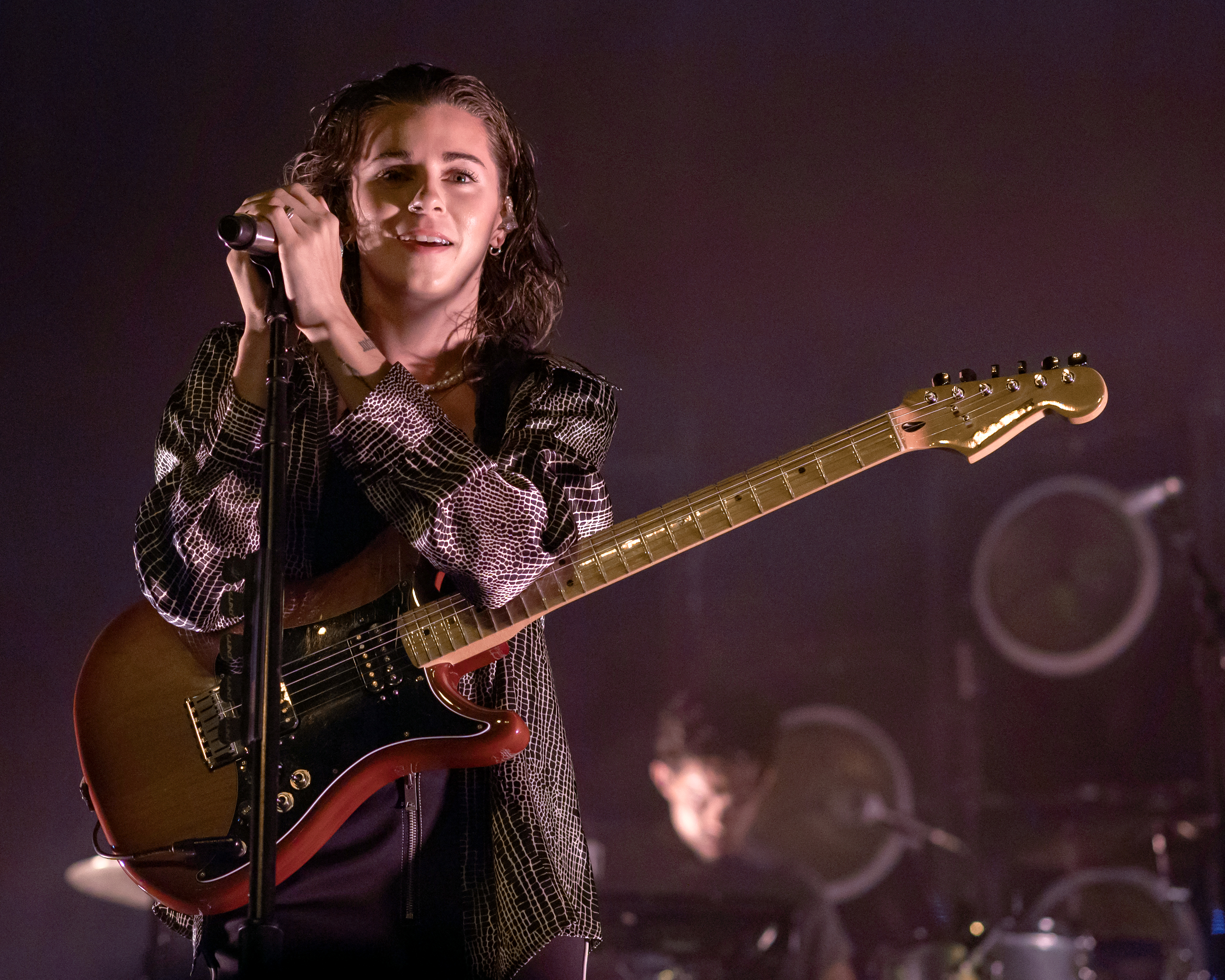
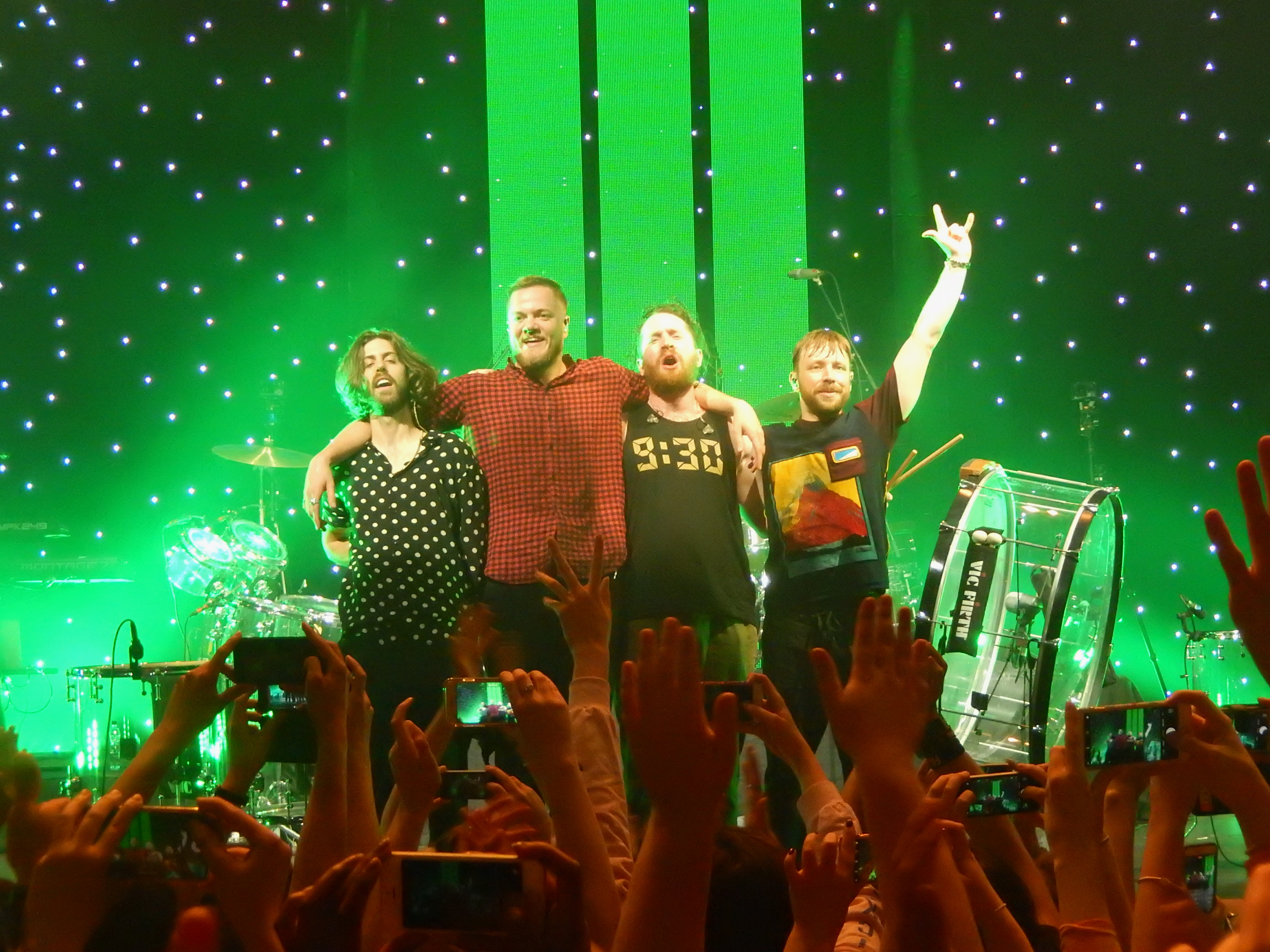
Lynn Gunn of PVRIS and Imagine Dragons performed in the show open.

DK and EDG were representatives of the LCK and LPL, respectively. This series marked the first time that two first-seeds from their respective groups faced off in a World Championship final. This was DK's second consecutive Worlds Finals appearance after winning the 2020 edition, while this was EDG's first as an organization, despite having made the MSI Finals in 2015, which they won. Moreover, this was the second Finals appearance for four of the five members of DWG KIA, since only one player from the 2020 roster (Nuguri) switched teams prior to the 2021 season. The series also marked the final competitive series for Kim "Khan" Dong-ha, who retired following the tournament to enter mandatory military service in South Korea. The Finals were a best-of-five series, with the first team to win a total of three games being crowned the champions.

The series was held on 6 November 2021 at the Laugardalshöll in Reykjavík, Iceland. Originally, the finals were scheduled to take place in Shenzhen, China, but was moved due to the COVID-19 pandemic. Unlike past finals, an opening ceremony was not held due to the venue being behind closed doors, which was another effect of the pandemic. Instead, Riot Games opted for a "Show Open" instead of an opening ceremony, which was a short-film featuring performances from musical artists, as well as backdrops from the first season of Arcane, which was released on Netflix on the day of the final. The short film was shot and produced in two locations: Los Angeles, United States and Birmingham, United Kingdom, consisting of computer generated imagery (CGI) and visual effects (VFX). The show open began with in-game characters Vi and Jinx, which then transitions to Bea Miller performing "Welcome to the Playground," a song included in Arcane Season 1's original soundtrack and is the title of the series' first episode, as well as a showcase of Zaun and Piltover which are fictional worlds from Legends of Runeterra. This was followed by Imagine Dragons and JID performing "Enemy," as the show open shows more of Zaun and the personalities of both Vi and Jinx. After more visuals from the animated series, the official theme song of the tournament, "Burn It All Down" was performed by Lynn Gunn of the American rock band PVRIS and American rapper Denzel Curry, who performs one of the song's remixes. At the tail-end of the song, a pre-recorded video showcasing the DK and EDG players was played alongside the reveal of the Summoner's Cup.

The English language streams were cast by Max "Atlus" Anderson of the League of Legends Champions Korea (LCK), Andrew "Vedius" Day of the League of Legends European Championship (LEC), and Sam "Kobe" Hartman-Kenzler of the League Championship Series (LCS).

=== Team line-ups ===
Neither team made any line-up changes going into the finals. DK's coaches were Kim "KkOma" Jeong-gyun and Lee "PoohManDu" Jeong-hyeon, while EDG's coaches were Yang "Maokai" Jisong and Zhu "KenZhu" Kai.

Role	DK	EDG
Top	Kim "Khan" Dong-ha	Li "Flandre" Xuanjun
Jungle	Kim "Canyon" Geon-bu	Zhao "Jiejie" Lijie
Middle	Heo "ShowMaker" Su	Lee "Scout "Ye-chan
ADC	Jang "Ghost" Yong-ju	Park "Viper" Do-hyeon
Support	Cho "BeryL" Geon-hee	Tian "Meiko" Ye

== Series ==
=== Game 1 ===
Game 1 Team Compositions
Role	DK	EDG
Top	Yasuo	Graves
Jungle	Xin Zhao	Jarvan
Middle	LeBlanc	Ryze
ADC	Ziggs	Jhin
Support	Rakan	Zilean

Game 1 ended in 35:39 minutes, with a final kill scoreline of 16–4, in favour of EDG.

=== Game 2 ===
Game 2 Team Compositions
Role	DK	EDG
Top	Graves	Irelia
Jungle	Qiyana	Xin Zhao
Middle	Malzahar	LeBlanc
ADC	Jhin	Kai'Sa
Support	Leona	Rakan

Game 2 ended in 32:18 minutes, with a final kill scoreline of 22–3, in favour of DK.

=== Game 3 ===
Game 3 Team Compositions
Role	EDG	DK
Top	Jayce	Gragas
Jungle	Xin Zhao	Lee Sin
Middle	Twisted Fate	Sylas
ADC	Jhin	Aphelios
Support	Leona	Braum

Game 3 ended in 36:02 minutes, with a final kill scoreline of 17–7, in favour of DK, putting them once win away from winning the world championship.

=== Game 4 ===
Game 4 Team Compositions
Role	EDG	DK
Top	Graves	Gwen
Jungle	Viego	Talon
Middle	Zoe	Orianna
ADC	Lucian	Jhin
Support	Lulu	Nami

Game 4 ended in 33:08 minutes, with a final kill scoreline of 6–3, in favour of EDG, forcing a deciding fifth and final game.

=== Game 5 ===
Game 5 Team Compositions
Role	DK	EDG
Top	Graves	Kennen
Jungle	Trundle	Xin Zhao
Middle	Syndra	Zoe
ADC	Ziggs	Aphelios
Support	Leona	Rakan

Game 5 ended in 41:19 minutes, which is the longest game of the series with a final kill scoreline of 21–10 in favour of EDG, who would win their first world championship.

== Post-series ==
EDG became the third team from China's League of Legends Pro League (LPL) to win the world championship after Invictus Gaming in 2018 and FunPlus Phoenix in 2019. The tournament had a base prize pool of US$2,225,000. Of this, the winners, EDG, received 22% ($495,000) of the pool. For coming second, DK was rewarded 15% ($337,500). As with previous world champions, EDG worked directly with Riot's visual department to release skins for their chosen champions, with one per player. The skins imitate the team's design and other elements, including a silver dragon theme with silver and blue adornments. In addition, the skins also had a chroma edition in black and red colors - representing the team's jersey colors during the tournament, as well as signatures from each player on recall animations. The chosen champions were Graves, picked by Flandre; Viego, picked by Jiejie; Zoe, picked by Scout; Aphelios, picked by Viper; and Yuumi, picked by Meiko.

In the following season, EDG retained its roster for the 2022 competitive campaign. Despite keeping the same group of players, the team underperformed during the Spring Split with a 10–6 win-loss record before losing in the second round of playoffs against Weibo Gaming, 1–3. However, EDG were able to improve their standing during the Summer Split, finishing in fifth place with an 11–5 slate. In the playoffs, the team started in the second round, winning two consecutive matches before losing to Top Esports in the fourth round. EDG would then be relegated to the lower bracket, where despite a 3–1 victory over LNG Esports, they would face a 0–3 sweep to Top Esports in the lower bracket final. After the domestic season, EDG still had a chance to make it to the 2022 World Championship through the LPL Regional Finals, which determined the third and fourth seeds of the LPL to qualify for Worlds. As the team had the highest number of championship points out of all participating squads, they only needed to win one match. EDG would win its qualification match against 2022 Mid-Season Invitational champions Royal Never Give Up, 3–2, to qualify for the 2022 edition of Worlds. EDG finished their group stage campaign in the tournament with a 4–2 record, losing only to T1 twice. Having qualified for the knockout stage, the squad was drawn to face the LCK's fourth seed DRX. Despite EDG taking a 2–0 lead in the match, they would drop three consecutive games and lose in the quarterfinals, 2–3. DRX would go on to win the world championship against T1 in the tournament final.
