= 2015 Mid-Season Invitational =

League of Legends tournament

Tournament information
- Location: United States
- Dates: 7 May–10 May
- Administrator: Riot Games
- Venue(s): Donald L. Tucker Civic Center (Tallahassee, Florida)
- Teams: 6
- Purse: $200,000

Final positions
- Champions: Edward Gaming
- Runner-up: SK Telecom T1
- MVP: Ming "Clearlove" Kai (Edward Gaming)

The 2015 Mid-Season Invitational is the first event of the Mid-Season Invitational (MSI) – a League of Legends tournament organized by publisher Riot Games that was held after Spring Season, from May 7–10, 2015 at the Florida State University Donald L. Tucker Civic Center in Tallahassee, Florida. The participants is 6 winner teams of the Spring Season: 5 teams from North America (NA LCS), Europe (EU LCS), China (LPL), South Korea (LCK), Taiwan/Hong Kong/Macau (LMS) and a team from Wildcard regions (Brazil, CIS, Japan, Latin America, Oceania, Southeast Asia) that won the Mid-Season International Wildcard Invitational (IWCI).

EDward Gaming from China won the first ever MSI title after defeating SK Telecom T1 from South Korea 3–2 at the final.

== Qualified teams ==
Region	League	Path	Team
Starting in the bracket stage
China	LPL	Spring champion	EDward Gaming
South Korea	LCK	Spring champion	SK Telecom T1
Europe	EU LCS	Spring champion	Fnatic
North America	NA LCS	Spring champion	Team SoloMid
TW/HK/MO	LMS	Spring champion	ahq e-Sports Club
Turkey	TCL	IWCI winner	Beşiktaş e-Sports Club

== Venue ==
Tallahassee was the city chosen to host the competition.

Tallahassee, Florida
Donald L. Tucker Civic Center
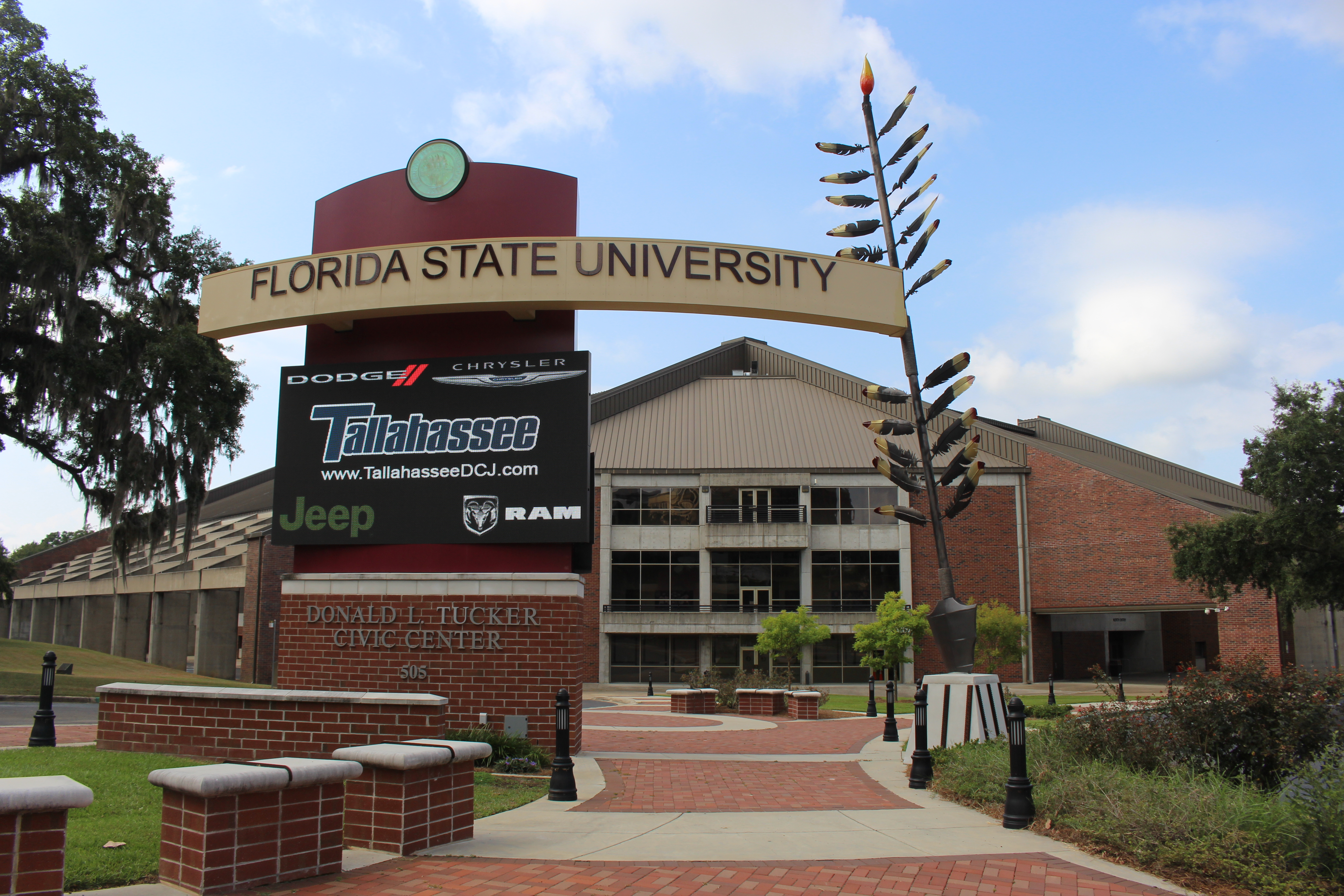

== Group stage ==
- Single Round Robin, all matches are Best-of-one.
- Top 4 teams advance to Knock-out Stage.

Pos	Team	Pld	W	L	PCT	Qualification
1	SK Telecom T1	5	5	0	1.000	Advance to Knockout Stage
2	EDward Gaming	5	4	1	0.800	Advance to Knockout Stage
3	Ahq e-Sports Club	5	3	2	0.600	Advance to Knockout Stage
4	Fnatic	5	2	3	0.400	Advance to Knockout Stage
5	Team SoloMid	5	1	4	0.200	
6	Beşiktaş e-Sports Club	5	0	5	0.000	

Source: LoL Esports (Archived 2015-05-09 at the Wayback Machine)

== Knock-out stage ==
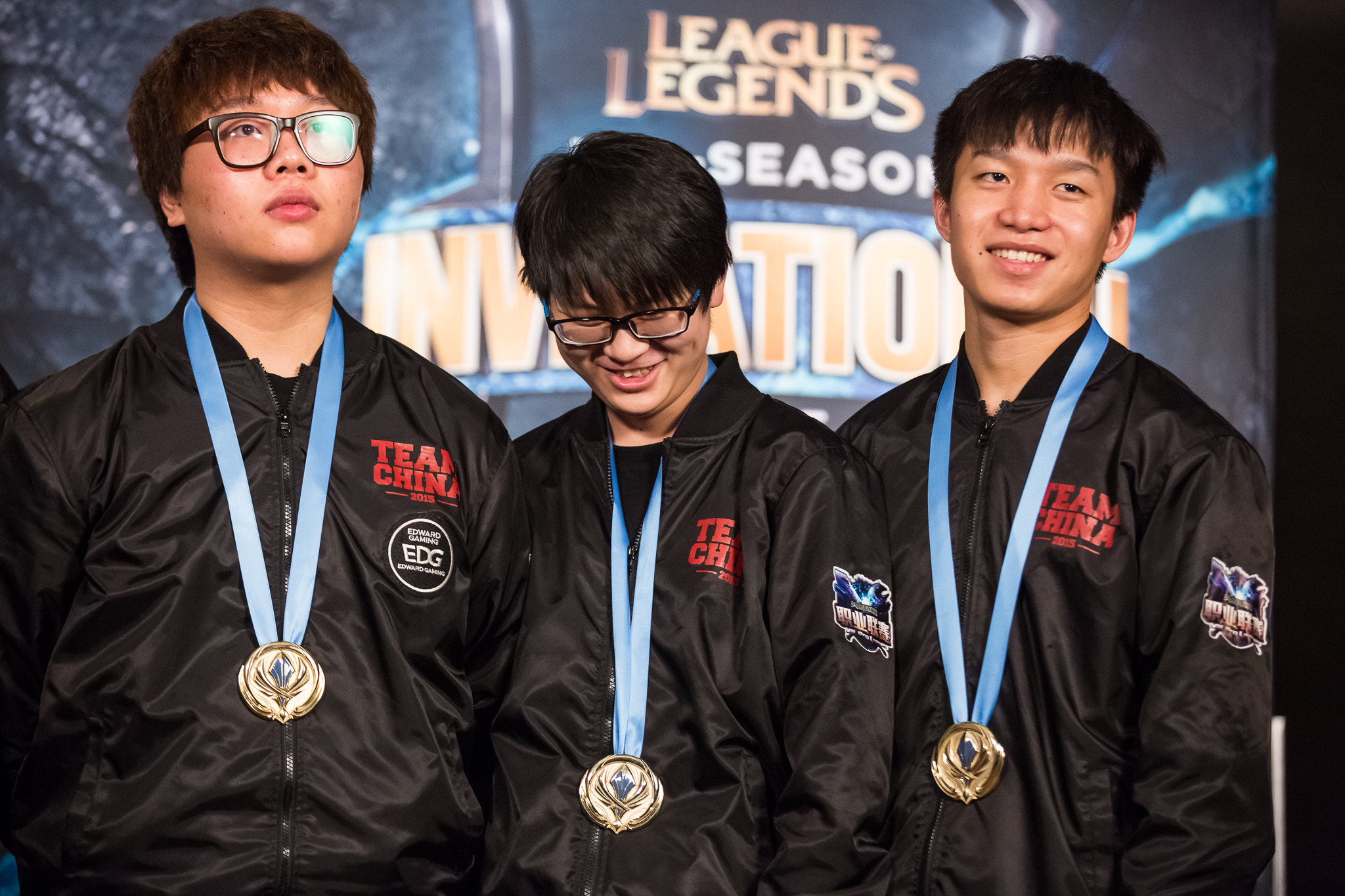
Some members of Edward Gaming with their championship medals

- The 1st-place team plays with the 4th-place team, The 2nd-place team plays with the 3rd-place team in semifinals.
- All matches are Best-of-five.

Semifinals
1	SK Telecom T1	3
4	Fnatic	2
2	EDward Gaming	3
3	ahq e-Sports Club	0

Final
SK Telecom T1	2
EDward Gaming	3
