= Edward Gaming =

Chinese esports organization

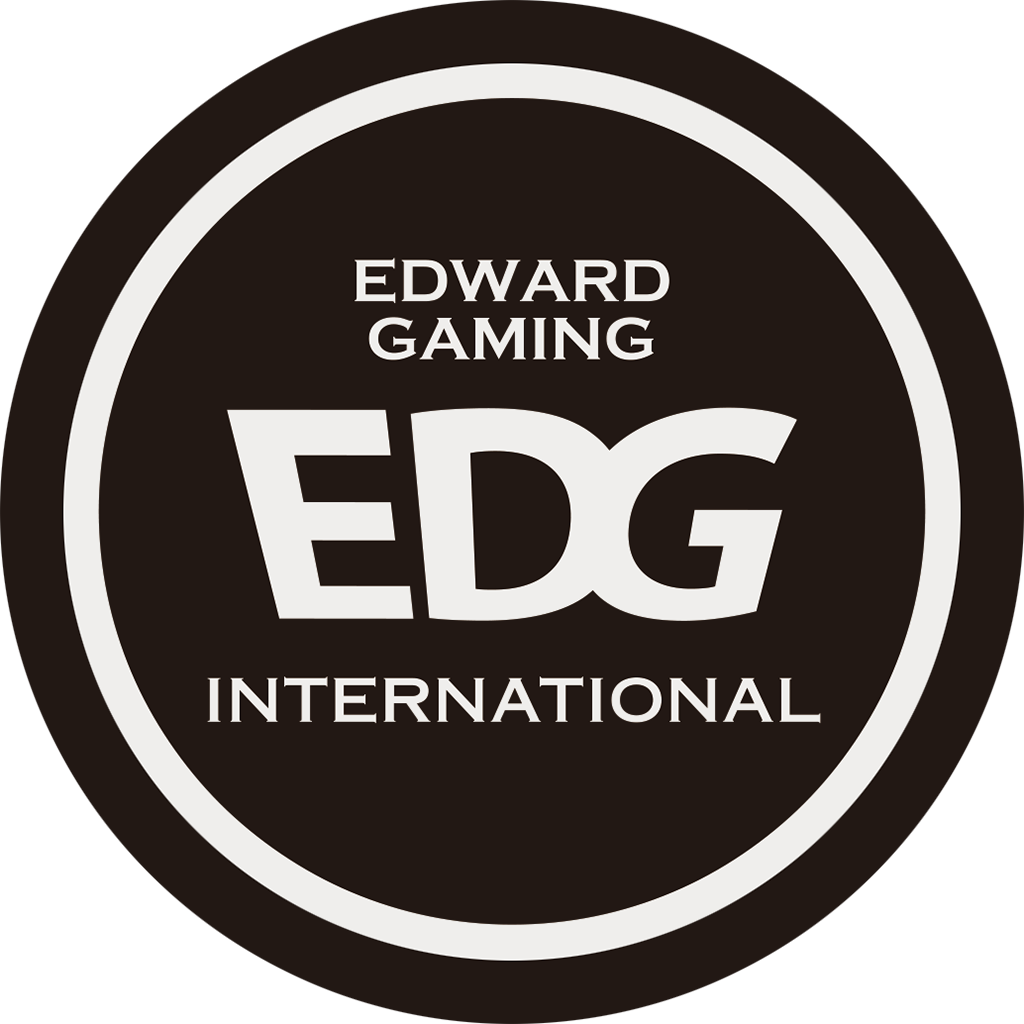
- Short name: EDG
- Founded: September 2013
- League: League of Legends Pro League
- Based in: Shanghai, China
- Arena: Hongkou Football Stadium
- Divisions: League of Legends; League of Legends: Wild Rift; Valorant; Arena of Valor; Hearthstone
- Championships: 1× Mid-Season Invitational (2015); 1× World Championship (2021); 1× Valorant Champions (2024)
- Partners: Hycan; Huya Live; Red Bull; Intel; Razer Inc. ExxonMobil; Dior; TCL Technology; Bixin; Luckin Coffee; Coca-Cola
- Website: https://www.edgteam.cn/

Edward Gaming (Note: Previously stylized as EDward Gaming.) (EDG) is a Chinese professional esports organization based in Shanghai.

EDG's League of Legends team, officially called EDG Hycan, competes in the League of Legends Pro League (LPL) and plays home games at the Shanghai Electric Industrial Park. It is the only LPL team to have won both the Mid-Season Invitational and the World Championship, in 2015 and 2021 respectively.

EDG's VALORANT team competes in the VALORANT Champions Tour as a partnered franchised team. Since 2022, they have consistently represented China on the international stage, attending almost every international event since their debut at 2022 VALORANT Champions. They won 2024 Valorant Champions, beating Team Heretics 3-2. EDG is also the only organization to have won the world championships of both of Riot Game's major titles.

== League of Legends ==
=== History ===
==== 2014 ====
Edward Gaming (EDG) was founded in September 2013 by SanShao, BingGui, and Edward Zhu, the team's namesake; Zhu is the eldest son of Zhu Mengyi, founder and former chairman of real estate company Hopson Development. They first entered the professional League of Legends scene in September 2013, then secured a spot in the 2014 LPL Spring Split by acquiring the slot of LMQ, which had left to compete in the 2014 NA Challenger Series. EDG's first acquisitions were Jie and former Positive Energy AD carry NaMei, who both signed with the team on 10 February. Soon after on 12 February, they acquired former World Elite players ClearLove and fzzf as their jungler and support, as well as Koro1 as their top laner.

On 29 April, EDG placed first at the 2014 International Esports Tournament in Yiwu, Zhejiang.

EDG gained a reputation as a "super team", emerging as the champions of the 2014 LPL Spring Split on 25 May.

They continued to perform well into the 2014 LPL Summer Split, finishing in first place in both the regular season and playoffs. In the finals of the playoffs on 24 August, they defeated OMG in the LPL Spring Final on 24 August. In addition to their LPL success, EDG also found success in other events, finishing top two at every major tournament they competed in. EDG won the 2014 China Regional Finals on 7 September, securing the first seed from China at the 2014 World Championship. However, EDG underperformed at the World Championship. The team tied for second in their group with ahq e-Sports Club and ended up losing to fellow LPL team Star Horn Royal Club 2–3 in the first round of playoffs.

On 12 September, EDG won the X Championship Season I. On 26 October, EDG placed first at the 2014 NVIDIA Game Festival. On 2 November, EDG finished in second place at the 2014 National Electronic Sports Tournament (NEST 2014). Samsung Galaxy Blue AD carry Deft announced on 11 November that he had joined EDG. On 2 December, mid laner PawN joined EDG from Samsung Galaxy White. EDG won the 2014 National Electronic Sports Open, defeating LGD Gaming in the finals on 7 December. On 13 December, they placed first at Demacia Cup Season 2. On 17 December, Azure, now known as Meiko, joined the team.

On 28 December, EDG placed first at G-League 2014.

==== 2015 ====
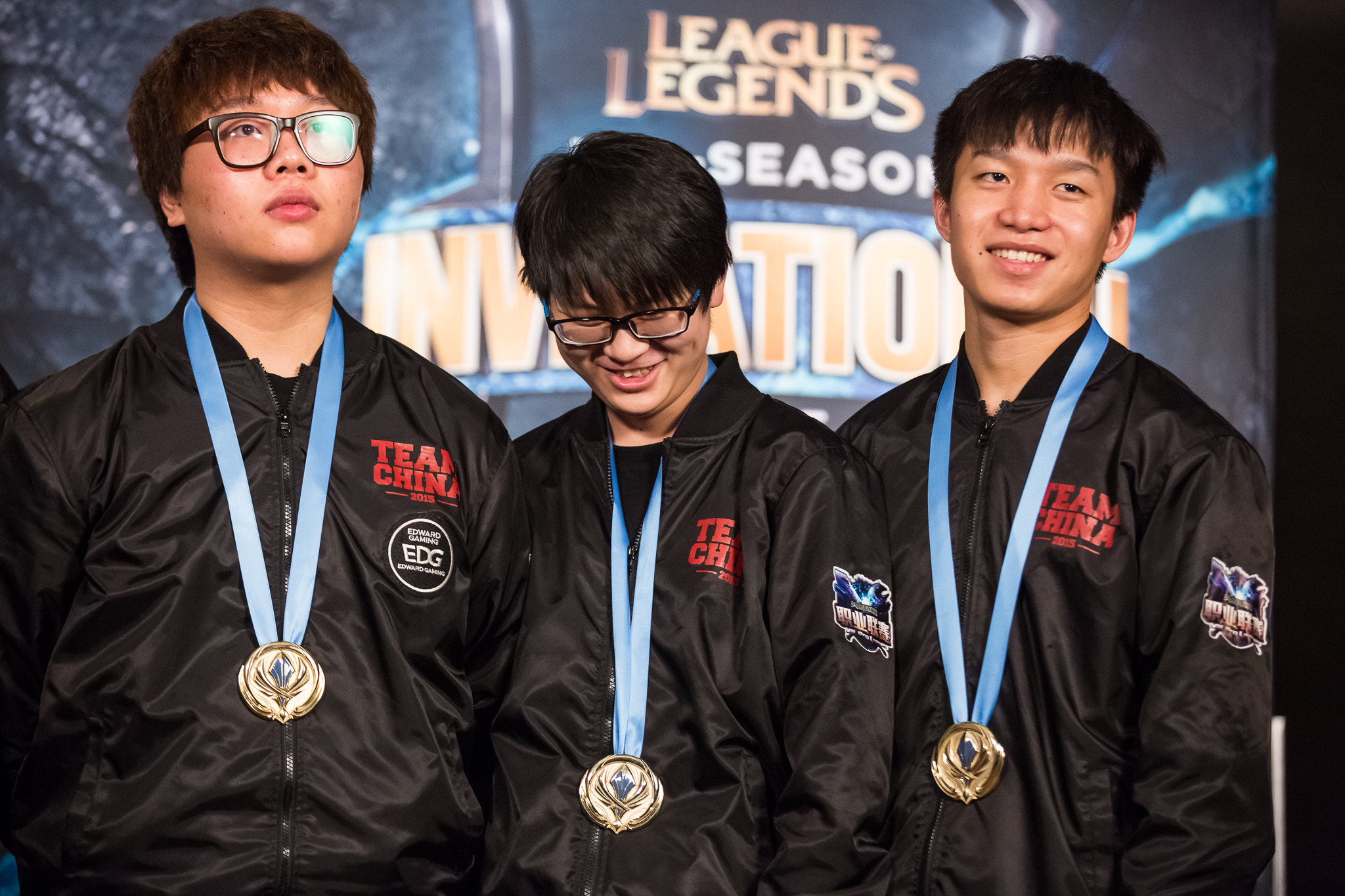
Players posing with medals after winning the 2015 Mid-Season Invitational

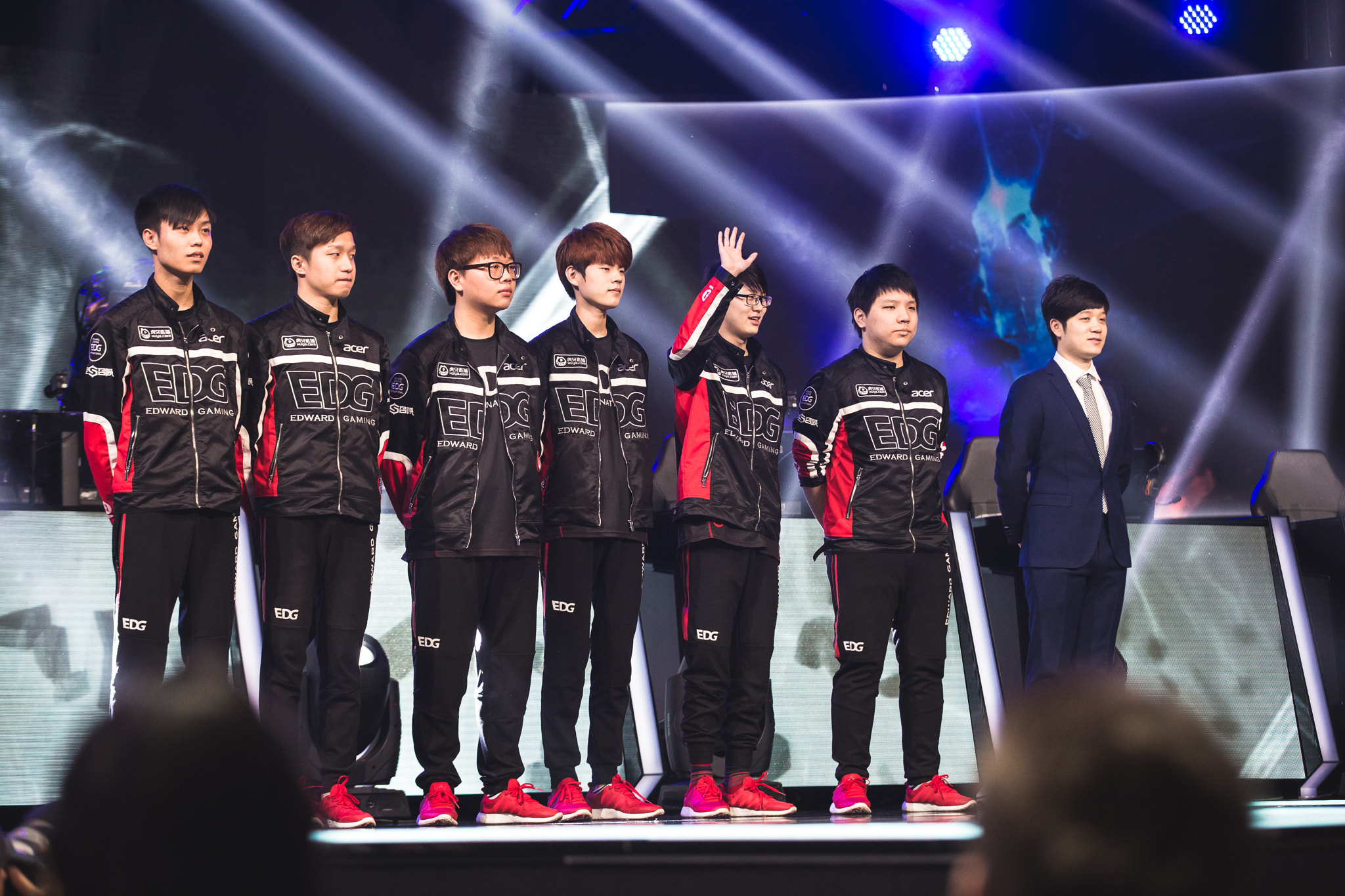
Edward Gaming at the 2015 League of Legends World Championship

On 4 January, NaMei left the team and joined Star Horn Royal Club. On 15 January, the day before the beginning of the 2015 LPL Spring Split, fzzf announced his retirement. He was replaced temporarily by Mouse, who played with the team at the G-League 2014 Finals, and in the first two weeks of the LPL Spring Split.

On 16 January, EDG started a Hearthstone division with lvxiaobu, yutian and longshi.

From week three of the split, Meiko played as the team's support. On 26 April, Reapered joined as a coach. EDG finished first in the 2015 LPL Spring Playoffs, defeating LGD 3–2 in the finals. EDG's LPL Spring title qualified them for the inaugural Mid-Season Invitational.

EDward Gaming beat SK Telecom T1 in the finals of the 2015 Mid-Season Invitational and were crowned as the tournament's inaugural champions.

At the 2015 World Championship, EDG lost in the quarterfinals to the European team Fnatic 0–3.

==== 2016 ====
In January 2016, EDG's Counter-Strike: Global Offensive division was established.

In January 2016, in the 2015 GHL Storm Hero Gold Finals, EDG lost to eStar 2–4 and finished runners-up. In June 2016, EDG E-sports Club officially announced the suspension of the Storm Hero Project.

On 23 April 2016, in the 2016 LPL Spring Final, EDG lost to Royal Never Give Up (RNG) 1–3 and finished runners-up.

EDG qualified for the 2016 LPL Summer Playoffs thanks to their placement in the regular season. EDG lost to RNG 0–3 in the 2016 LPL Summer Final and received the second seed for the LPL at the 2016 World Championship.

EDG tied with AHQ after the group stage, and the former qualified for the quarterfinals after beating the latter in a tiebreaker match. On 16 October 2016, EDG lost to South Korean team ROX Tigers 1–3 in the quarterfinals and was eliminated from the tournament. In the Demacia Cup held in December 2016, EDG defeated RNG 3–1 and advanced to the finals. In the final, EDG defeated the I May and set a record of five consecutive tournament championships by an LPL team.

==== 2017 ====
In April 2017, EDG lost to RNG 1–3 in the LPL Spring Playoffs semifinals and followed up with a 3–2 victory over OMG, finishing third. In the LPL Summer Split, the EDG defeated Invictus Gaming (IG) in the second round of playoffs to advance to the finals. In the final, EDG defeated RNG to win their fifth LPL title and qualify for the 2017 World Championship. EDG was eliminated from the 2017 World Championship after failing to place top two in their group, ending with a 2–4 record.

In 2017, the club officially established EDG.M as its mobile division and acquired the original 2016 World Cyber Games champion roster. In the Kings Glory Champions Cup, EDG lost 2–4 to the Qiao Gu Reapers in the quarterfinals.

In July 2017, EDG and Tyloo announced their new strategic partnership, stating that they would jointly train new players and help cultivate CS:GO talent in China. In November, the two teams created a jointly owned PlayerUnknown's Battlegrounds team.

On 31 October 2017, EDG and Lyon Esports announced their joint venture to establish "Lyon China" to compete in FIFA Online 3 esports tournaments.

==== 2018 ====
On 7 January 2018, EDG won the Demacia Cup Winter with a 3–1 victory over Snake Esports.

In the 2018 LPL Spring Split, EDG advanced to the playoffs after finishing first in the regular season, defeating Rogue Warriors before losing to RNG in the finals and finishing runners-up.

On 4 May 2018, EDG announced the completion of a nearly ¥100 million Pre-A round of financing, with the joint lead investor being the China Idol Entertainment Industry Fund, which is dominated by Capital and CIC Zhongcai.

==== 2020 ====
EDG placed sixth in the regular season of the 2020 LPL Spring Split with a record of 9 wins and 7 losses. In the first round of the playoffs, they defeated RNG and advanced to the second round. In the second round, they lost 1–3 to FunPlus Phoenix (FPX). EDG placed ninth in the regular season of the 2020 LPL Summer Split with a record of 8 wins and 8 losses and failed to qualify for the playoffs; the team's worst domestic performance to date.

==== 2021 ====
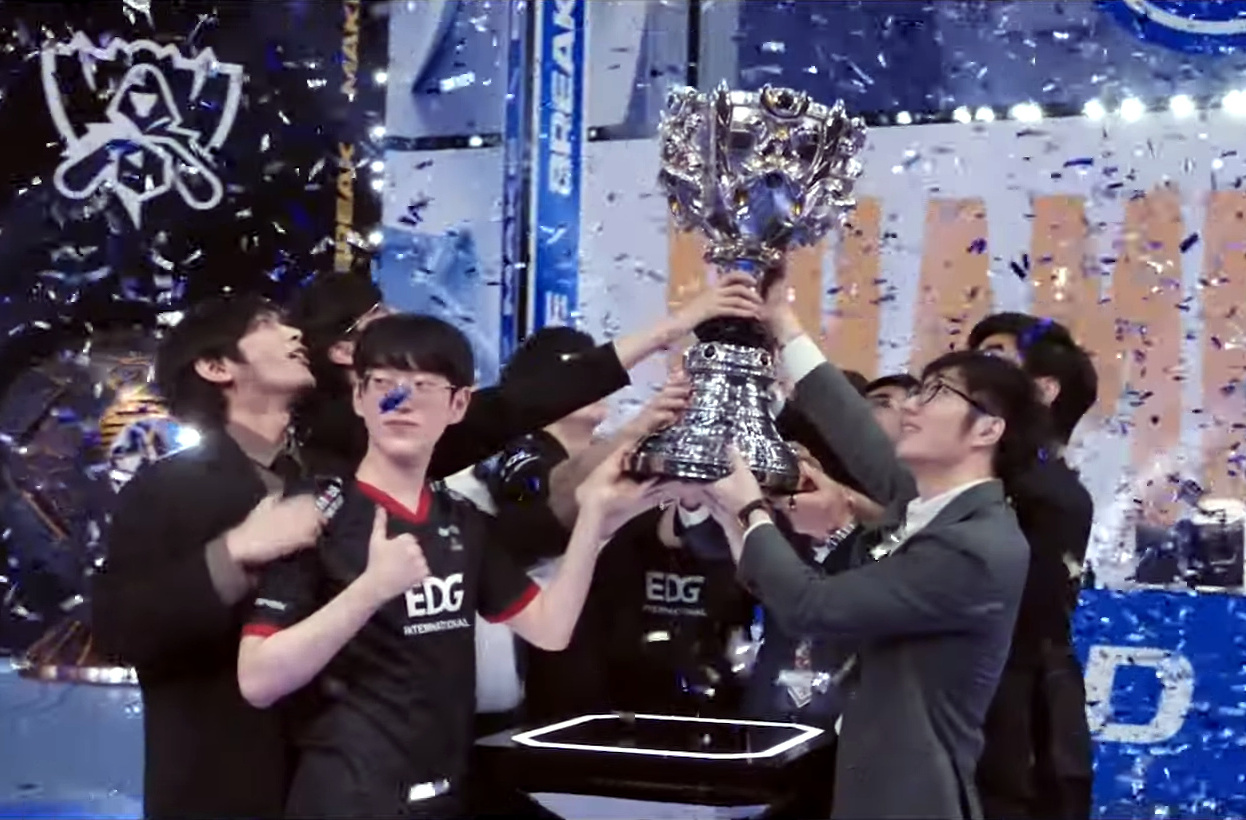
Edward Gaming won the 2021 World Championship.

EDG won the 2021 World Championship, and became the first team to do so while playing three full best-of-five series.

==== 2022 ====
During the 2022 League of Legends World Championship, Edward Gaming finished 5-8th after losing 2-3 to DRX, becoming the second team in World Championship history to be reverse swept at the event.

=== Roster ===
Edward Gaming League of Legends roster
Players
Coaches

Role	Handle	Name	Nationality
Top	Ale	Hu Jiale	China
Top	Solokill	Mak Fe Keung	China
Jungle	Jiejie	Zhao Lijie	China
Mid	Fisher	Lee Jeongtae	South Korea
Bot	Leave	Hu Hongchao	China
Support	Vampire	Zhao Zhe Can	China
Jungle	Monki	Wang Mengqi	China

Head coach

Ming "Clearlove" Kai

Assistant coach(es)

Chang "Poppy" Po-Hao Yi
Peng "Mni" Fang

Legend:
- (I) Inactive
- (S) Suspended
- Substitute
- (injured) Injury / Illness

Roster

== Valorant ==
=== History ===
==== 2022 ====
EDG made their international debut in 2022, with a roster of Haodong "Haodong" Guo, Shunzhi "CHICHOO" Wan, Senxu "nobody" Wang, Yongkang "Zmjjkk" Zheng, and Donghao "Life" Qu. The team attended 2022 Valorant Champions in Istanbul, Turkey placing 13-16th. Yongkang "ZmjjKK" Zheng, or simply "KangKang" (Chinese: 康康), especially impressed with his mechanical skill on the duelist role.

==== 2023 ====
In 2023, a roster change was made. Donghao "Life" Qu left the team and was replaced in the starting lineup by Zhao "Smoggy" Zhang. The team was invited to VCT 2023: LOCK//IN São Paulo in São Paulo, Brazil, placing 17th-32nd.

They would come in second in FGC Valorant Invitational 2023: Act 1, but qualified to Valorant Masters Tokyo, placing 5th-6th, losing to Team Liquid and Paper Rex.

They placed 1st in FGC Valorant Invitational 2023: Act 2 and VALORANT Champions Tour 2023: China Qualifier, and attended 2023 Valorant Champions in Los Angeles, California, placing 5th-6th.

==== 2024 ====
The team started 2024 strong, winning the VALORANT Champions Tour 2024: China Kickoff event and qualifying to VALORANT Champions Tour 2024: Masters Madrid. They placed 5th-6th once more, losing to Gen.G and LOUD.

They then won VALORANT Champions Tour 2024: China Stage 1, qualified to VALORANT Champions Tour 2024: Masters Shanghai, but placed only 7th-8th, dropping matches to Team Heretics and Paper Rex.

After losing their first match of VCT 2024: China Stage 2 to Wolves Esports, a change was made. Longtime in-game leader Haodong "Haodong" Guo was removed from the starting lineup, with Senxu "nobody" Wang taking over as in-game leader. On June 15, Weihong "WoodAy1" Lin joined as a substitute player, and on June 25, Meng-hsun "S1mon" Hsieh joined the starting lineup. Another change was made on July 27, when head coach Wen-hsin "AfteR" Lo was benched, and assistant coach Shijun "Muggle" Tang was promoted in his place. The team stabilized, dropping only two more matches and won VCT 2024: China Stage 2, qualifying to 2024 Valorant Champions in Seoul, South Korea.

In Seoul, EDG won their opening group stage match against Turkish powerhouse FUT Esports 2-0, then lost their second match to North American upstarts G2 Esports 1-2. Facing off against rival Pacific juggernaut Paper Rex, EDG narrowly won 2-1, qualifying to playoffs.

In the double elimination playoff format, they went on an unstoppable upper bracket run, winning first against fellow Chinese team Trace Esports 2-0 and North American team Sentinels 2-1. In the Upper Bracket Final, they sent North American #1 seed Leviatán to the lower bracket in a close 2-1 match, qualifying for the first grand final in their Valorant team's history. In the final, facing Team Heretics, EDward Gaming won 3-2, sealing their first Valorant championship, as well as the VCT CN league's first overall international title. For his contributions, star duelist player Zheng "ZmjjKK" Yongkang was awarded the MVP Award for the event.

==== 2025 ====
EDG started their 2025 Kickoff event by beating Nova Esports 2-0, but stumbled shortly after, losing to Trace Esports 2-1, knocking them to the lower bracket. In the lower bracket, the team went on a run, beating 2024 Ascension newcomers XLG Esports 2-1 and 2023 Ascension winners Dragon Ranger Gaming 2-0. Along the way, EDG won 30 rounds in a row. After winning the second map against XLG on a four round win streak, the team went 13-0 on the third map to beat XLG, then started their next game against DRG 13-0 as well. They beat Bilibili Gaming 3-0 in the lower bracket finals, a victory that qualified them to 2025 Masters Bangkok. EDG then won VCT China Kickoff 2025 with a commanding 3-1 victory over Trace Esports, the same team that had knocked them into the lower bracket earlier in the tournament, with the final map a lopsided 13-2 rout for EDG.

=== Roster ===
EDward Gaming Valorant roster
Players
Coaches

Handle	Name	Nationality
CHICHOO	Wan, Shunzhi	China
nobody	Wang, Senxu	China
ZmjjKK	Zheng, Yongkang	China
Smoggy	Zhang, Zhao	China
Jieni7	Zhang, Juntai	China
stew	Park, Young-chan	South Korea
zjc	Zhang, Juncheng	China

Head coach

Yoon "Autumn" Eu-teum

Assistant coach(es)

Seol "Indigo" Do-hoon

Legend:
- (I) Inactive
- (S) Suspended
- Substitute
- (injured) Injury / Illness

Roster updated 21 August 2026.

== Honours ==
=== Domestic ===
==== League ====
- League of Legends Pro League (LPL)
  - Winners (6): 2014 Spring, 2014 Summer, 2015 Spring, 2016 Summer, 2017 Summer, 2021 Summer
- Valorant Champions Tour Valorant China Evolution Series
  - Winners (3): 2023 Act 1, 2023 Act 2, 2023 Act 3
- Valorant Champions Tour China
  - Winners (4): 2024 Kickoff, 2024 Stage 1, 2024 Stage 2, 2025 Kickoff

==== Cup ====
- Demacia Cup
  - Winners (5): 2014 Season 2, 2015 Spring, 2015 Summer, 2016 Season, Championship 2017 Season

=== International ===
- Mid-Season Invitational
  - Winners (1): 2015
- League of Legends World Championship
  - Winners (1): 2021
- Valorant Champions
  - Winners (1): 2024

== Notes ==
Awards and achievements
Preceded by Damwon Gaming	League of Legends World Championship winner 2021; With: Flandre, Jiejie, Scout, Viper, Meiko	Succeeded by DRX
Preceded by New championship	Mid-Season Invitational winner 2015	Succeeded by SK Telecom T1
Preceded by Positive Energy; Royal Never Give Up; Team WE	League of Legends Pro League winner Spring 2014 – Spring 2015; Summer 2016; Summer 2017	Succeeded by LGD Gaming; Team WE; Royal Never Give Up
Preceded by New championship	Valorant Champions Tour: China; Spring 2023 – present	Succeeded by TBD
Preceded by Evil Geniuses	Valorant Champions; 2024	Succeeded by NRG
