= Kobe (commentator) =

American esports commentator

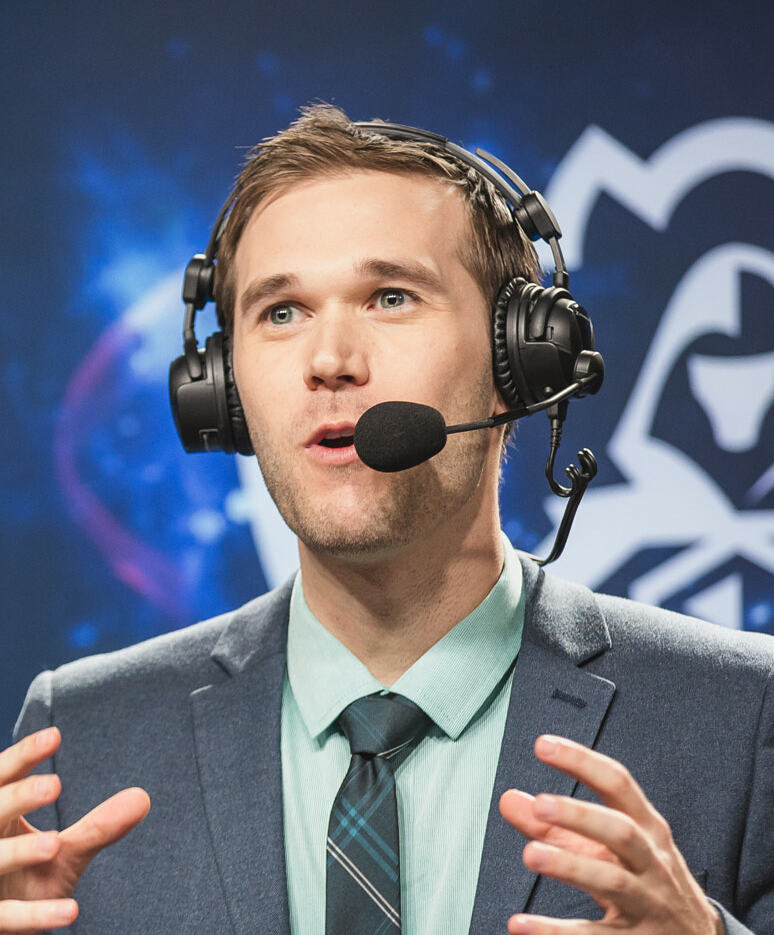
- Kobe in 2015

Personal information
- Name: Sam Hartman-Kenzler
- Nationality: American

Career information
- Game: League of Legends
- Playing career: 2010–2011

Team history
- 2010–2011: Counter Logic Gaming
- Sports commentary career
- Sport: Esports
- Employer: Riot Games (2013–present)

Sam Hartman-Kenzler, better known by his in-game ID Kobe, is an American League of Legends sports commentator for Riot Games. He has also spent several years playing for the professional team Counter Logic Gaming. He has had one of the longest careers of a sports commentator in the North American League of Legends Championship Series and has cast in several major international tournaments.

== Career ==
Kobe started his gaming career playing Pokémon, then moved onto Ocarina of Time and Goldeneye. He eventually started playing Super Smash Brothers and entered a few small tournaments. He then moved on to play DotA on W3 and Aeon of Strife. After graduating from college, he went backpacking in Europe spending a majority of his money.

A friend later told him about League of Legends, which was at the time a new free to play game in its Beta stages. He started his League career playing nothing but Shaco for 3 months, and while leveling up he met future team member HotshotGG. He then proceeded to carry himself to high elo using AP Sion and Katarina. This is where he would meet Bigfatjiji, Chauster, and Lilballz. Bigfatjiji would later invite Kobe24 and HotshotGG to a team that would later be called Counter Logic Gaming. He competed for Counter Logic Gaming as their Jungler until early 2011, when he retired from the professional scene to pursue an education and career in engineering.

Kobe came back to the scene as a shoutcaster for online tournaments before being hired by Riot for the North American LCS.
