= 2026 LPL season =

- League: LPL
- Sport: League of Legends
- Duration: 14 January – 8 March (Split 1); 4 April – 14 June (Split 2); 22 July – 13 September (Split 3)
- Teams: 14 (Splits 1 and 2); 12 (Split 3)

Split 1
- Winners: Bilibili Gaming
- Runners-up: JD Gaming
- Season MVP: Lee "Tarzan" Seung-yong (Anyone's Legend)

Split 2
- Winners: Bilibili Gaming
- Runners-up: Top Esports
- Season MVP: Zhuo "Knight" Ding (Bilibili Gaming)

Split 3
- Season Champions: Anyone's Legend
- Runners-up: Bilibili Gaming
- Season MVP: Zhuo "Knight" Ding (Bilibili Gaming)

LPL seasons
- ← 2025 2027 →

The 2026 LPL season was the 14th season of the League of Legends Pro League (LPL), a Chinese professional esports league for the video game League of Legends. It consisted of 14 teams participating in the first two splits, with 12 contesting the third, with each split qualifying teams to three international tournaments. The season began on 14 January and ended on 13 September.

Bilibili Gaming won the first two splits of the season, defeating JD Gaming and Top Esports, respectively. Anyone's Legend won the season championship, defeating Bilibili Gaming to secure the region's first seed at the 2026 World Championship. Both Bilibili Gaming and Top Esports also qualified for both the Mid-Season Invitational and Worlds, while Invictus Gaming also confirmed its slot at the latter tournament as the fourth seed through the regional qualifiers.

With its qualification for all three international competitions, Bilibili Gaming became one of four teams across all six Tier 1 regions to achieve the feat.

== League changes ==
=== Championship points ===
Similar to previous years, the LPL will utilize the championship points system in determining one of its representatives to the 2026 League of Legends World Championship, but the amount of points garnered increased from the most recent season. For instance, the team that wins the first split of 2026 would receive 80 points, as compared to only 20 from the previous season.

=== Teams ===
Two teams from the previous season left the league prior to the 2026 season. On 17 November 2025, 2019 League of Legends World Championship winners FunPlus Phoenix announced their departure from the LPL, while three-time Mid-Season Invitational champions Royal Never Give Up was confirmed not to participate for the 2026 season due to the organization's financial and legal issues. During the 2025 season, RNG finished as one of the bottom two teams, thus relegating them to the League of Legends Development League (LDL). However, the team and its academy team RNG Academy had to forfeit all its matches, owing to said issues. On 8 January 2026, RNG eventually confirmed its departure from competitive League of Legends.

The problems surrounding RNG stemmed from the organization being unable to meet both financial and legal commitments. Due to this, the Shanghai No.1 Intermediate People's Court imposed a CN¥ 160 million penalty in July 2025. RNG was also classified as a "high-risk defaulter" by the court. It was also further noted that the organization had also faced other issues.

With the departure of FPX and RNG, the league reduced to 14 teams.

== Split 1 ==
=== Format ===
Split 1 featured all 14 teams divided into three groups for the group stage - Group Ascend, Group Perseverance, and Group Nirvana. Each team was placed in their respective groups based on their performance during the 2025 season. The group stage followed a double round-robin format, with all matches being played in best-of-threes. The top four (4) Ascend teams directly advanced to the playoffs, while the bottom two (2) from the same group joined all the teams from the Perseverance group and the top two (2) Nirvana teams in Knights Rivals play-in stage. The bottom two (2) teams in the Nirvana group were eliminated.

The Knights Rivals play-in stage applied a hybrid double-elimination bracket with all matches being best-of-fives. In the first round, the bottom two (2) teams from Ascend faced the top two (2) teams from Perseverance with the winner of those two matches advancing to the playoffs. Meanwhile, the bottom two (2) teams from Perseverance and the top two teams from Nirvana went up against each other in elimination matches, with the winning teams advancing to face the losing teams from the first round for the final two spots in the playoffs.

In the playoffs, an eight-team double-elimination bracket was applied, with all matches played in best-of-fives. The two finalists from Split 1 qualified as the league's representatives at the 2026 First Stand Tournament.

=== Group Stage ===
Group Ascend

Pos	Team	Pld	W	L	PCT	Qualification
1	Anyone's Legend	10	8	2	.800	Playoffs
2	Bilibili Gaming	10	6	4	.600	Playoffs
3	Weibo Gaming	10	5	5	.500	Playoffs
4	JD Gaming	10	5	5	.500	Playoffs
5	Top Esports	10	4	6	.400	Knights Rivals
6	Invictus Gaming	10	2	8	.200	Knights Rivals

Updated to match(es) played on 6 February 2026. Source: LoL Esports

Group Perseverance

Pos	Team	Pld	W	L	PCT	Qualification
1	Ninjas in Pyjamas	6	4	2	.667	Knights Rivals
2	Team WE	6	4	2	.667	Knights Rivals
3	EDward Gaming	6	4	2	.667	Knights Rivals
4	TT Gaming	6	0	6	.000	Knights Rivals

Updated to match(es) played on 5 February 2026. Source: LoL Esports

Tiebreaker

1st Place Tiebreaker; 7 February
Ninjas in Pyjamas	2
Team WE	0

Group Nirvana

Pos	Team	Pld	W	L	PCT	Qualification
1	LNG Esports	6	6	0	1.000	Knights Rivals
2	Oh My God	6	3	3	.500	Knights Rivals
3	LGD Gaming	6	2	4	.333	Eliminated
4	Ultra Prime	6	1	5	.167	Eliminated

Updated to match(es) played on 3 February 2026. Source: LoL Esports

=== Knights Rivals ===
Qualification Series

Qualification Series 1; 9 February
A5	Top Esports	3
P2	Team WE	2

Qualification Series 2; 9 February
A6	Invictus Gaming	1
P1	Ninjas in Pyjamas	3

Lower Bracket

Elimination Series
10 February
P4	TT Gaming	0
N1	LNG Esports	3
10 February
P3	EDward Gaming	1
N2	Oh My God	3

Qualification Series
11 February
P2	Team WE	3
N1	LNG Esports	1
11 February
A6	Invictus Gaming	3
N2	Oh My God	0

Source: LoL Esports

=== Playoffs ===
Venue: Yangcheng International Esports Center, Suzhou

Upper quarterfinals	Upper semifinals	Upper final	Final
24 February
A4	JD Gaming	3
26 February
A5	Top Esports	2
A4	JD Gaming	3
24 February
A1	Anyone's Legend	2
A1	Anyone's Legend	3
4 March
P2	Team WE	0
A4	JD Gaming	2
25 February
A2	Bilibili Gaming	3
A3	Weibo Gaming	3
27 February
A6	Invictus Gaming	0
A3	Weibo Gaming	0
25 February
A2	Bilibili Gaming	3
A2	Bilibili Gaming	3	8 March
P1	Ninjas in Pyjamas	0	A2	Bilibili Gaming	3
A4	JD Gaming	1
Lower round 1	Lower quarterfinals	Lower semifinal	Lower final
2 March
28 February	A3	Weibo Gaming	3	7 March
A5	Top Esports	3	A5	Top Esports	2	5 March	A4	JD Gaming	3
P2	Team WE	0	A3	Weibo Gaming	3	A3	Weibo Gaming	0
3 March	A1	Anyone's Legend	1
1 March	A1	Anyone's Legend	3
A6	Invictus Gaming	3	A6	Invictus Gaming	1
P1	Ninjas in Pyjamas	1

Source: LoL Esports

=== Awards ===
- Most Valuable Player: Tarzan, Anyone's Legend
- Finals MVP: Knight, Bilibili Gaming
- Best Rookie: About, Team WE
- Best Coaching Staff: Anyone's Legend
- 1st All-Pro Team:
  - T Flandre, Anyone's Legend
  - J Tarzan, Anyone's Legend
  - M Knight, Bilibili Gaming
  - B Elk, Weibo Gaming
  - S Kael, Anyone's Legend
- 2nd All-Pro Team:
  - T Bin, Bilibili Gaming
  - J Xun, Bilibili Gaming
  - M Shanks, Anyone's Legend
  - B Viper, Bilibili Gaming
  - S ON, Bilibili Gaming
- 3rd All-Pro Team:
  - T Xiaoxu, JD Gaming
  - J Jiejie, Weibo Gaming
  - M Creme, Top Esports
  - B Hope, Anyone's Legend
  - S Vampire, JD Gaming

== Split 2 ==
=== Format ===
Split 2 saw the same 14 teams divided into two groups - Group Ascend and Group Nirvana - based on their standings from the first split. The top eight (8) teams from Split 1 comprised Ascend, while the bottom six (6) were assigned to Nirvana. The top four (4) teams from Ascend automatically qualified for the playoffs, while the bottom four (4) teams joined the top four teams from Nirvana in the Knights Rivals play-in stage. The bottom two (2) teams from the Nirvana group were eliminated from the 2026 LPL season.

The Knights Rivals play-in stage saw eight (8) teams competing for the final four spots in the playoffs in best-of-five matches. Similar to the first split, the playoffs also featured eight teams and best-of-five matches, with the finalists qualifying for the 2026 Mid-Season Invitational. The formats for each of the three stages has not been announced.

As Bilibili Gaming won the 2026 First Stand Tournament, both of the LPL's representatives at MSI had a bye to the bracket stage.

=== Group Stage ===
Group Ascend

Pos	Team	Pld	W	L	PCT	Qualification
1	Bilibili Gaming	14	12	2	.857	Playoffs
2	JD Gaming	14	9	5	.643	Playoffs
3	Top Esports	14	8	6	.571	Playoffs
4	Anyone's Legend	14	8	6	.571	Playoffs
5	Ninjas in Pyjamas	14	7	7	.500	Knights Rivals
6	Weibo Gaming	14	6	8	.429	Knights Rivals
7	Invictus Gaming	14	5	9	.357	Knights Rivals
8	Team WE	14	1	13	.071	Knights Rivals

Updated to match(es) played on 17 May 2026. Source: LoL Esports

Group Nirvana

Pos	Team	Pld	W	L	PCT	Qualification
1	LNG Esports	5	4	1	.800	Knights Rivals
2	TT Gaming	5	3	2	.600	Knights Rivals
3	LGD Gaming	5	3	2	.600	Knights Rivals
4	EDward Gaming	5	3	2	.600	Knights Rivals
5	Ultra Prime	5	2	3	.400	Eliminated from 2026 LPL season
6	Oh My God	5	0	5	.000	Eliminated from 2026 LPL season

Updated to match(es) played on 16 May 2026. Source: LoL Esports

=== Knights Rivals ===
Qualification Match 1
23 May
A8	Team WE	3
N1	LNG Esports	2

Qualification Match 2
23 May
A7	Invictus Gaming	0
N2	TT Gaming	3

Qualification Match 3
24 May
A5	Ninjas in Pyjamas	2
N4	EDward Gaming	3

Qualification Match 4
24 May
A6	Weibo Gaming	2
N3	LGD Gaming	3

=== Playoffs ===
Venues:

- Buji Culture & Sports Center, Shenzhen
- Optics Valley Gymnasium, Wuhan (Lower Bracket Final & Final)

Upper quarterfinals	Upper semifinals	Upper final	Final
29 May – Shenzhen
A2	JD Gaming	3
31 May – Shenzhen
N2	TT Gaming	1
A2	JD Gaming	1
29 May – Shenzhen
A3	Top Esports	3
A3	Top Esports	3
7 June – Shenzhen
N3	LGD Gaming	0
A3	Top Esports	3
30 May – Shenzhen
A8	Team WE	0
A4	Anyone's Legend	3
1 June – Shenzhen
N4	EDward Gaming	0
A4	Anyone's Legend	0
30 May – Shenzhen
A8	Team WE	3
A1	Bilibili Gaming	1	14 June – Wuhan
A8	Team WE	3	A3	Top Esports	0
A1	Bilibili Gaming	3
Lower round 1	Lower quarterfinals	Lower semifinal	Lower final
5 June – Shenzhen
2 June – Shenzhen	A4	Anyone's Legend	3	13 June – Wuhan
N3	LGD Gaming	3	N3	LGD Gaming	0	8 June – Shenzhen	A8	Team WE	2
N2	TT Gaming	2	A4	Anyone's Legend	0	A1	Bilibili Gaming	3
6 June – Shenzhen	A1	Bilibili Gaming	3
3 June – Shenzhen	A2	JD Gaming	1
N4	EDward Gaming	0	A1	Bilibili Gaming	3
A1	Bilibili Gaming	3

Source: LoL Esports

=== Awards ===
- Most Valuable Player: Knight, Bilibili Gaming
- Finals MVP: Knight, Bilibili Gaming
- Best Rookie: Heru, TT Gaming
- Best Coaching Staff: Bilibili Gaming
- 1st All-Pro Team:
  - T Bin, Bilibili Gaming
  - J Xun, Bilibili Gaming
  - M Knight, Bilibili Gaming
  - B Viper, Bilibili Gaming
  - S ON, Bilibili Gaming
- 2nd All-Pro Team:
  - T Flandre, Anyone's Legend
  - J Tarzan, Anyone's Legend
  - M HongQ, JD Gaming
  - B JackeyLove, Top Esports
  - S Vampire, JD Gaming
- 3rd All-Pro Team:
  - T Xiaoxu, JD Gaming
  - J JunJia, JD Gaming
  - M Creme, Top Esports
  - B GALA, JD Gaming
  - S Kael, Anyone's Legend

== Split 3 ==
=== Format ===
The remaining 12 teams was divided into Group Ascend and Group Nirvana for the group stage, similar to the second split. After the group stage, the Knights Rivals play-in stage qualified the last remaining teams for the playoffs. The playoffs was contested in best-of-five matches, with the winner of Split 3 being crowned the Season Champion and securing qualification for the 2026 League of Legends World Championship, filling up one of the four slots allotted for the region. The other three spots were determined by championship points and regional qualification results.

=== Group Stage ===
Group Ascend

Pos	Team	Pld	W	L	PCT	Qualification
1	Bilibili Gaming	14	12	2	.857	Advance to Playoffs
2	Anyone's Legend	14	9	5	.643	Advance to Playoffs
3	Top Esports	14	9	5	.643	Advance to Playoffs
4	JD Gaming	14	8	6	.571	Advance to Playoffs
5	Team WE	14	7	7	.500	Advance to Playoffs
6	LGD Gaming	14	6	8	.429	Advance to Playoffs
7	TT Gaming	14	3	11	.214	Advance to Knights Rivals
8	EDward Gaming	14	2	12	.143	Advance to Knights Rivals

Updated to match(es) played on 23 August 2026. Source: LoL Esports

Group Nirvana

Pos	Team	Pld	W	L	PCT	Qualification
1	Ninjas in Pyjamas	6	6	0	1.000	Advance to Knights Rivals
2	Invictus Gaming	6	4	2	.667	Advance to Knights Rivals
3	Weibo Gaming	6	2	4	.333	Eliminated
4	LNG Esports	6	0	6	.000	Eliminated

Updated to match(es) played on 22 August 2026. Source: LoL Esports

=== Knights Rivals ===
Venue: Beijing Smart Esports Center, Beijing

28 August
EDward Gaming	0
Ninjas in Pyjamas	3

28 August
TT Gaming	0
Invictus Gaming	3

=== Playoffs ===
Venues:

- Inzone Esports Industrial Park, Shanghai
- Shanghai Oriental Sports Center, Shanghai (Lower Bracket Final & Final)

Upper Bracket Round 1	Upper Bracket Round 2	Upper Bracket Final	Grand Final
4 September
29 August	A2	Anyone's Legend	3
A3	Top Esports	2	A6	LGD Gaming	1	7 September
A6	LGD Gaming	3	A2	Anyone's Legend	0
3 September	A1	Bilibili Gaming	3
30 August	A1	Bilibili Gaming	3
A4	JD Gaming	1	A5	Team WE	1
13 September
A5	Team WE	3
A1	Bilibili Gaming	1
A2	Anyone's Legend	3
Lower Bracket Round 1	Lower Bracket Round 2	Lower Bracket Round 3	Lower Bracket Final
6 September
5 September	A5	Team WE	1	12 September
N2	Invictus Gaming	3	N2	Invictus Gaming	3	8 September	A2	Anyone's Legend	3
A3	Top Esports	2	N2	Invictus Gaming	3	N2	Invictus Gaming	2
6 September	A6	LGD Gaming	0
5 September	A6	LGD Gaming	3
N1	Ninjas in Pyjamas	3	N1	Ninjas in Pyjamas	2
A4	JD Gaming	0

Source: LoL Esports

=== Awards ===
- Most Valuable Player: Knight, Bilibili Gaming
- Finals MVP: Tarzan, Anyone's Legend
- Best Rookie: About, Team WE
- Best Coaching Staff: Bilibili Gaming
- 1st All-Pro Team:
  - T ZUIAN, Top Esports
  - J Tarzan, Anyone's Legend
  - M Knight, Bilibili Gaming
  - B Viper, Bilibili Gaming
  - S ON, Bilibili Gaming
- 2nd All-Pro Team:
  - T Xiaoxu, JD Gaming
  - J Xun, Bilibili Gaming
  - M Shanks, Anyone's Legend
  - B JackeyLove, Top Esports
  - S Kael, Anyone's Legend
- 3rd All-Pro Team:
  - T TheShy, Invictus Gaming
  - J Heng, LGD Gaming
  - M Tangyuan, LGD Gaming
  - B GALA, JD Gaming
  - S Vampire, JD Gaming

== World Championship qualification ==
=== Championship points ===
Pos	Team	S1	S2	S3	Total	Qualification
1	Anyone's Legend	20	30	AQ	AQ	2026 World Championship
2	Bilibili Gaming	80	110	110	300	2026 World Championship
3	Top Esports	10	80	15	105	Advance to Regional Qualifier 3rd Seed Playoff
4	Invictus Gaming	10	0	80	90	Advance to Regional Qualifier 3rd Seed Playoff
5	Team WE	5	50	30	85	Advance to Regional Qualifier Elimination Match
6	JD Gaming	50	15	15	80	Advance to Regional Qualifier Elimination Match
7	LGD Gaming	0	15	50	65	
8	Weibo Gaming	40	0	0	40	
9	Ninjas in Pyjamas	5	0	30	35	
10	EDward Gaming	0	10	0	10	
11	TT Esports	0	10	0	10	
12	LNG Esports	0	0	0	0	
13	Ultra Prime	0	0	N/A	0	
14	Oh My God	0	0	N/A	0	

=== Regional Qualifier ===
The regional qualifier was a tournament consisting of the top four teams in the LPL based on championship points that have not directly qualified for the 2026 World Championship. The top two teams faced off, and the winner earned a spot in the World Championship. The bottom two teams then played against each other, with the losing team being eliminated. The remaining two teams then competed for the last LPL spot in the 2026 World Championship. The three best-of-five matches were held over three consecutive days, from 17 to 19 September.

==== Bracket ====
Venue: League Arena, Shanghai

Round 1
17 September
3	Top Esports	3
4	Invictus Gaming	1
18 September
5	Team WE	1
6	JD Gaming	3

4th Seed Playoff
19 September
4	Invictus Gaming	3
6	JD Gaming	1

Advance to Worlds
Top Esports
Invictus Gaming

Source: LoL Esports
