= 2020 LPL season =

Eighth season of South Korea's League of Legends Champions Korea

- League: LPL
- Sport: League of Legends
- Duration: 13 January – 2 May (Spring); 5 June – 27 August (Summer); 28 August – 30 August (Regional Finals)
- Teams: 17

Spring
- Season champions: JD Gaming
- Runners-up: Top Esports
- Top seed: Invictus Gaming
- Season MVP: Seo "Kanavi" Jin-hyeok (JD Gaming)

Summer
- Season champions: Top Esports
- Runners-up: JD Gaming
- Top seed: Top Esports
- Season MVP: Zhuo "knight" Ding (Top Esports)

Regional Finals
- Winner: Suning
- Runners-up: LGD Gaming

LPL seasons
- ← 2019 2021 →

The 2020 LPL season was the eighth year of China's League of Legends Pro League (LPL), a professional esports league for the MOBA PC game League of Legends.

The spring split began on 13 January, but was suspended after the first week of competition due to the COVID-19 pandemic in mainland China. The season resumed on 9 March with games being played online, However, several players could not play due to travel restrictions after they returned to their hometowns. and concluded with the spring finals on 2 May.

The summer split began on 5 June and concluded with the summer finals on 27 August.

== Spring ==
=== Regular season ===
Pos	Team	W	L	Pts	Qualification
1	Invictus Gaming	14	2	12	Advance to semifinals
2	JD Gaming	12	4	8	Advance to semifinals
3	FunPlus Phoenix	12	4	8	Advance to quarterfinals
4	Top Esports	11	5	6	Advance to quarterfinals
5	eStar Gaming	11	5	6	Advance to Round 1
6	Edward Gaming	9	7	2	Advance to Round 1
7	Royal Never Give Up	8	8	0	Advance to Round 1
8	Team WE	8	8	0	Advance to Round 1
9	Vici Gaming	7	9	−2	
10	Bilibili Gaming	7	9	−2	
11	Suning	7	9	−2	
12	Oh My God	7	9	−2	
13	Rogue Warriors	7	9	−2	
14	Dominus Esports	6	10	−4	
15	LGD Gaming	5	11	−6	
16	LNG Esports	5	11	−6	
17	Victory Five	0	16	−16	

=== Playoffs ===
Round 1
5	eStar Gaming	1
8	Team WE	3
6	Edward Gaming	3
7	Royal Never Give Up	1

Quarterfinals
4	Top Esports	3
R1	Team WE	1
3	FunPlus Phoenix	3
R1	Edward Gaming	1

Semifinals
1	Invictus Gaming	1
QF	Top Esports	3
2	JD Gaming	3
QF	FunPlus Phoenix	0

Finals
SF	Top Esports	2
SF	JD Gaming	3
Third-place match
SF	Invictus Gaming	0
SF	FunPlus Phoenix	3

== Summer ==
=== Regular season ===
Pos	Team	W	L	Pts	Qualification
1	Top Esports	13	3	10	Advance to semifinals
2	JD Gaming	13	3	10	Advance to semifinals
3	Invictus Gaming	12	4	8	Advance to quarterfinals
4	Suning	12	4	8	Advance to quarterfinals
5	Victory Five	11	5	6	Advance to Round 1
6	LGD Gaming	10	6	4	Advance to Round 1
7	Team WE	9	7	2	Advance to Round 1
8	FunPlus Phoenix	9	7	2	Advance to Round 1
9	Royal Never Give Up	8	8	0	
10	Edward Gaming	8	8	0	
11	Vici Gaming	8	8	0	
12	Bilibili Gaming	6	10	−4	
13	LNG Esports	5	11	−6	
14	Oh My God	4	12	−8	
15	Rogue Warriors	4	12	−8	
16	eStar Gaming	3	13	−10	
17	Dominus Esports	1	15	−14	

=== Playoffs ===
Round 1
5	Victory Five	3
8	FunPlus Phoenix	1
6	LGD Gaming	3
7	Team WE	1

Quarterfinals
4	Suning	3
R1	Victory Five	1
3	Invictus Gaming	0
R1	LGD Gaming	3

Semifinals
1	Top Esports	3
QF	Suning	0
2	JD Gaming	3
QF	LGD Gaming

Finals
SF	Top Esports	3
SF	JD Gaming	2
Third-place match
SF	Suning	3
SF	LGD Gaming	0

== World Championship qualification ==
=== Seeds ===
- Seed 1: Qualifies for the 2020 World Championship main event as the winner of the 2020 LPL Summer Playoffs
- Seed 2: Qualifies for the 2020 World Championship main event as the team with the most Championship Points accumulated from the spring and summer splits
- Seed 3: Qualifies for the 2020 World Championship main event as the winner of the 2020 LPL Regional Finals
- Seed 4: Qualifies for the 2020 World Championship play-in stage as the runners-up of the 2020 LPL Regional Finals

=== Championship Points distribution ===
Point distribution
Pos	Spring	Summer
1st	60	AQ^{1}
2nd	40	90
3rd	30	70
4th	20	40
5th	10	20
6th	10	10

^{1} Auto qualification as the LPL's first seed.

=== Regional Finals ===
Excluding the first and second seeds, the remaining four teams with the most Championship Points qualify for the Regional Finals (if Championship Points are equal, the final seeding for the regional finals is determined by teams' summer season rankings).

- Team 1: Suning (70 pts)
- Team 2: LGD Gaming (40 pts)
- Team 3: Invictus Gaming (30 pts)
- Team 4: FunPlus Phoenix (30 pts)

Round 1 (WB/LB)
CP1	Suning	3
CP2	LGD Gaming	0
CP3	Invictus Gaming	3
CP4	FunPlus Phoenix	2

Losers' bracket finals
WB	LGD Gaming	3
LB	Invictus Gaming	1

Seeding for Worlds
WB	Suning	3rd Seed
LB	LGD Gaming	4th Seed

Note: The winner of Round 1, Game 1 (i.e. Suning vs LGD Gaming) is the Regional Finals winner and the LPL's third seed at the World Championship. The winner of Round 2 is the Regional Finals runners-up and the LPL's fourth seed at the World Championship. The losers of Round 1, Game 2 (i.e. Invictus Gaming vs FunPlus Phoenix) and Round 2 are eliminated from World Championship contention.
