= 2025 LPL season =

- League: LPL
- Sport: League of Legends
- Duration: 12 January – 1 March (Split 1); 22 March – 14 June (Split 2); 19 July – 21 September (Split 3); 25–27 September (Regional Qualifiers)
- Teams: 16 (Splits 1 and 2); 14 (Split 3)

Split 1
- Winners: Top Esports
- Runners-up: Anyone's Legend
- Season MVP: Kim "Doinb" Tae-sang (Ninjas in Pyjamas)

Split 2
- Winners: Anyone's Legend
- Runners-up: Bilibili Gaming
- Season MVP: Lee "Tarzan" Seung-yong (Anyone's Legend)

Split 3
- Season Champions: Bilibili Gaming
- Runners-up: Top Esports
- Season MVP: Yu "JackeyLove" Wenbo (Top Esports)

LPL seasons
- ← 2024 2026 →

The 2025 LPL season was the 13th season of the League of Legends Pro League (LPL), a Chinese professional esports league for the video game League of Legends. It was the first LPL season under the new three-split structure and competitive calendar introduced by the game's developer Riot Games starting with the 2025 competitive season. Unlike past seasons, the 2025 LPL season was merged into three stages. The season began on 12 January and ended on 27 September.

Top Esports defeated Anyone's Legend with a 3–1 scoreline to win the first split and qualify for the 2025 First Stand Tournament. Anyone's Legend would go on to win the second split by defeating Bilibili Gaming in the final with a score of 3–1, with both teams securing their spots at the 2025 Mid-Season Invitational. In the final split of the season, Bilibili Gaming became the LPL Season Champions, defeating Top Esports with a score of 3–2 and qualifying for the 2025 League of Legends World Championship as the LPL's first seed.

Anyone's Legend also qualified for the 2025 World Championship via Championship Points, thus earning the region's second seed. Through the regional qualifier, Top Esports and Invictus Gaming also qualified as the third and fourth seeds respectively.

== League changes ==
=== Season structure and format ===
In line with Riot Games' announcement of a new split structure and competitive calendar for League of Legends esports beginning with the 2025 competitive season, the LPL announced on 14 December 2024 a three-stage season, with each stage having a different format. In addition, a season champion will be crowned after the third stage, and results from one stage will have implications for a team's seeding and placing for the succeeding stages. Initially, only Split 1 had "Fearless Draft", which was popularized by China's LoL Development League, where teams cannot pick a champion that they've already played in a series, even if the champion was picked by the opposing team. However, before the final of the 2025 First Stand Tournament on 16 March 2025, Riot Games announced that the format would continue for the rest of the season, including LPL's Split 2 and Split 3.

=== Teams ===
Only one team change occurred heading into the 2025 season. On 18 November 2024, the LPL repurchased Rare Atom's franchise slot, with the organization citing financial difficulties. With RA's departure, the league reduced to 16 teams.

== Split 1 ==
=== Format ===
Split 1 featured sixteen (16) competing teams during the Regular Season and were divided into four groups of four teams. Each team in their respective groups played a single round-robin where all matches were played as best-of-fives. The top two (2) teams in each group advanced to the eight-team Double-elimination tournament bracket, where all matches were also best-of-fives. The top seeds from each group were placed in the upper bracket while second seeds from each group were placed in the lower bracket. The winner of Split 1 qualified for the 2025 First Stand Tournament as the league's lone representative.

In addition to "Fearless Draft", side selection during the first game of each best-of-five series was decided by a one-on-one solo match. All subsequent games in a series had side selection given to the losing team.

=== Group Stage ===
==== Group A ====
Pos	Team	Pld	W	L	PCT	Qualification
1	Anyone's Legend	3	3	0	1.000	Advance to playoffs
2	Top Esports	3	2	1	.667	Advance to playoffs
3	LGD Gaming	3	1	2	.333	
4	Team WE	3	0	3	.000	

Updated to match(es) played on 17 February 2025. Source: LoL Esports

==== Group B ====
Pos	Team	Pld	W	L	PCT	Qualification
1	JD Gaming	3	3	0	1.000	Advance to playoffs
2	Weibo Gaming	3	2	1	.667	Advance to playoffs
3	Oh My God	3	1	2	.333	
4	Ultra Prime	3	0	3	.000	

Updated to match(es) played on 17 February 2025. Source: LoL Esports

==== Group C ====
Pos	Team	Pld	W	L	PCT	Qualification
1	TT Gaming	3	3	0	1.000	Advance to playoffs
2	Bilibili Gaming	3	2	1	.667	Advance to playoffs
3	EDward Gaming	3	1	2	.333	
4	LNG Esports	3	0	3	.000	

Updated to match(es) played on 17 February 2025. Source: LoL Esports

==== Group D ====
Pos	Team	Pld	W	L	PCT	Qualification
1	Ninjas in Pyjamas	3	3	0	1.000	Advance to playoffs
2	Invictus Gaming	3	2	1	.667	Advance to playoffs
3	Royal Never Give Up	3	1	2	.333	
4	FunPlus Phoenix	3	0	3	.000	

Updated to match(es) played on 17 February 2025. Source: LoL Esports

=== Playoffs ===
The remaining teams were drawn into their respective matchups during a draw show on 16 February 2025.

==== Lower Bracket Round 1 ====
Elimination Series 1; 23 February
Bilibili Gaming	3
Weibo Gaming	1

Elimination Series 2; 23 February
Top Esports	3
Invictus Gaming	1

==== Bracket ====
Upper Bracket Round 1	Upper Bracket Final	Final
22 February
TT Gaming	1
25 February
JD Gaming	3
JD Gaming	2
22 February
Anyone's Legend	3
Ninjas In Pyjamas	2
Anyone's Legend	3	1 March
Anyone's Legend	1
Lower Bracket Round 2	Lower Bracket Round 3	Lower Bracket Final	Top Esports	3
24 February
27 February
TT Gaming	1
26 February	JD Gaming	1
Bilibili Gaming	3
Bilibili Gaming	1	Top Esports	3
24 February
Top Esports	3
Ninjas In Pyjamas	1
Top Esports	3

Source: LoL Esports

=== Awards ===
Award	Player	Team
Finals MVP	JackeyLove	Top Esports
Season MVP	Doinb	Ninjas in Pyjamas
1st All-Pro Team
1st All-Pro Team	Flandre	Anyone's Legend
1st All-Pro Team	Tarzan	Anyone's Legend
1st All-Pro Team	Doinb	Ninjas in Pyjamas
1st All-Pro Team	Leave	Ninjas in Pyjamas
1st All-Pro Team	Kael	Anyone's Legend
2nd All-Pro Team
2nd All-Pro Team	Ale	JD Gaming
2nd All-Pro Team	Beichuan	TT Gaming
2nd All-Pro Team	Scout	JD Gaming
2nd All-Pro Team	1xn	TT Gaming
2nd All-Pro Team	ppgod	Ninjas in Pyjamas
3rd All-Pro Team
3rd All-Pro Team	TheShy	Invictus Gaming
3rd All-Pro Team	Kanavi	Top Esports
3rd All-Pro Team	knight	Bilibili Gaming
3rd All-Pro Team	Peyz	JD Gaming
3rd All-Pro Team	Feather	TT Gaming

== Split 2 ==
=== Format ===
Split 2 featured four phases – Group Stage, Rumble Stage, Knights Rivals and Playoffs, with the same (16) competing teams from Split 1 during the Regular Season. For the group stage, teams were re-seeded into four groups of four teams, similar to Split 1, based on the results from the said stage. Each team in their respective groups play a double round-robin where all matches are played in best-of-ones. The top two (2) teams in each of the four groups during the group stage advanced to "Group Ascend" for the rumble stage, while the third ranked teams in each group competed in a double-elimination play-in bracket, with a mix of best-of-one and best-of-three matches to determine the last two (2) spots in Ascend. The bottom ranked team in each group were placed in "Group Nirvana".

In the rumble stage, teams in the Ascend group competed in a double round-robin, while those in the Nirvana group were in a single round-robin. In each group, all matches were played in best-of-threes. The top four (4) Ascend teams advanced to the playoffs, while the next six teams qualified for the Knights Rivals stage. Meanwhile, the top two (2) teams of "Group Nirvana" joined latter stage. Teams that placed third and fourth were eliminated but featured in Split 3. The bottom two (2) Nirvana teams were eliminated from the 2025 LPL season.

The "Knights Rivals" Stage was a play-in tournament where the bottom six (6) Ascend teams and the top two (2) Nirvana teams competed in best-of-five matches, with the winning four (4) teams advancing to the playoffs. The playoffs were contested in an eight-team Double-elimination tournament bracket, where all matches were played in best-of-fives. The top four teams that advanced from Group Ascend got to choose their opponents in the upper bracket. The two (2) finalists automatically qualified for the 2025 Mid-Season Invitational, with the winner of Split 1 earning the LPL's first seed and the runner-up as the second seed.

A group stage draw was conducted on 14 March 2025 to determine the composition of the four groups.

=== Group Stage ===
==== Group A ====
- Dates of Matches: 22 & 26 March
- EDG and WE had a tie-breaker match for 3rd place, which WE won.

Pos	Team	Pld	W	L	PCT	Qualification
1	Weibo Gaming	6	5	1	.833	Group Ascend
2	Bilibili Gaming	6	5	1	.833	Group Ascend
3	Team WE	7	2	5	.286	Qualification Bracket
4	Edward Gaming	7	1	6	.143	Group Nirvana

Updated to match(es) played on 26 March 2025. Source: LoL Esports

==== Group B ====
- Dates of Matches: 24 & 28 March

Pos	Team	Pld	W	L	PCT	Qualification
1	Anyone's Legend	6	5	1	.833	Group Ascend
2	TT Gaming	6	3	3	.500	Group Ascend
3	Ultra Prime	6	2	4	.333	Qualification Bracket
4	Royal Never Give Up	6	2	4	.333	Group Nirvana

Updated to match(es) played on 28 March 2025. Source: LoL Esports

==== Group C ====
- Dates of Matches: 25 & 29 March

Pos	Team	Pld	W	L	PCT	Qualification
1	Top Esports	6	6	0	1.000	Group Ascend
2	Ninjas in Pyjamas	6	3	3	.500	Group Ascend
3	FunPlus Phoenix	6	2	4	.333	Qualification Bracket
4	Oh My God	6	1	5	.167	Group Nirvana

Updated to match(es) played on 25 March 2025. Source: LoL Esports

==== Group D ====
- Dates of Matches: 23 & 27 March

Pos	Team	Pld	W	L	PCT	Qualification
1	Invictus Gaming	6	6	0	1.000	Group Ascend
2	JD Gaming	6	4	2	.667	Group Ascend
3	LGD Gaming	6	2	4	.333	Qualification Bracket
4	LNG Esports	6	0	6	.000	Group Nirvana

Updated to match(es) played on 27 March 2025. Source: LoL Esports

==== Ascend Play-In ====
Round 1
30 March
FunPlus Phoenix	1
LGD Gaming	0
30 March
Ultra Prime	1
Team WE	0
Relegation Match
31 March
LGD Gaming	0
Team WE	2

Qualification Match 1
30 March
FunPlus Phoenix	2
Ultra Prime	1
Qualification Match 2
31 March
Ultra Prime	1
Team WE	2

Advance to Group Ascend
FunPlus Phoenix
Team WE

Source: LoL Esports

=== Rumble Stage ===
Group Ascend

Pos	Team	Pld	W	L	PCT	Qualification
1	Top Esports	18	15	3	.833	Advance to Playoffs
2	Anyone's Legend	18	13	5	.722	Advance to Playoffs
3	JD Gaming	18	12	6	.667	Advance to Playoffs
4	Bilibili Gaming	18	12	6	.667	Advance to Playoffs
5	Invictus Gaming	18	10	8	.556	Advance to Knights Rivals
6	Team WE	18	7	11	.389	Advance to Knights Rivals
7	Weibo Gaming	18	7	11	.389	Advance to Knights Rivals
8	FunPlus Phoenix	18	6	12	.333	Advance to Knights Rivals
9	Ninjas in Pyjamas	18	4	14	.222	Advance to Knights Rivals
10	TT Gaming	18	4	14	.222	Advance to Knights Rivals

Updated to match(es) played on 22 May 2025. Source: LoL Esports

Group Nirvana

Pos	Team	Pld	W	L	PCT	Qualification
1	EDward Gaming	5	4	1	.800	Advance to Knights Rivals
2	LGD Gaming	5	4	1	.800	Advance to Knights Rivals
3	LNG Esports	5	3	2	.600	Eliminated from Split 2
4	Ultra Prime	5	2	3	.400	Eliminated from Split 2
5	Oh My God	5	1	4	.200	Eliminated from 2025 LPL season
6	Royal Never Give Up	5	1	4	.200	Eliminated from 2025 LPL season

Updated to match(es) played on 11 May 2025. Source: LoL Esports

=== Knights Rivals ===
24 May
5	Invictus Gaming	3
12	EDward Gaming	0

25 May
8	FunPlus Phoenix	3
9	Ninjas in Pyjamas	2

26 May
6	Team WE	3
11	LGD Gaming	1

27 May
7	Weibo Gaming	3
10	TT Gaming	0

=== Playoffs ===
Upper quarterfinals	Upper semifinals	Upper final	Final
31 May
1	Top Esports	3
2 June
8	FunPlus Phoenix	1
1	Top Esports	0
31 May
4	Bilibili Gaming	3
4	Bilibili Gaming	3
9 June
5	Invictus Gaming	0
4	Bilibili Gaming	2
1 June
2	Anyone's Legend	3
2	Anyone's Legend	3
3 June
6	Team WE	0
2	Anyone's Legend	3
1 June
7	Weibo Gaming	1
3	JD Gaming	2	14 June
7	Weibo Gaming	3	2	Anyone's Legend	3
4	Bilibili Gaming	1
Lower round 1	Lower quarterfinals	Lower semifinals	Lower final
7 June
4 June	7	Weibo Gaming	1	13 June
8	FunPlus Phoenix	2	5	Invictus Gaming	3	11 June	4	Bilibili Gaming	3
5	Invictus Gaming	3	5	Invictus Gaming	3	5	Invictus Gaming	1
8 June	6	Team WE	0
5 June	1	Top Esports	2
6	Team WE	3	6	Team WE	3
3	JD Gaming	1

Source: LoL Esports

=== Awards ===
Award	Player	Team
Finals MVP	Tarzan	Anyone's Legend
Season MVP	Kanavi	Top Esports
1st All-Pro Team
1st All-Pro Team	369	Top Esports
1st All-Pro Team	Kanavi	Top Esports
1st All-Pro Team	knight	Bilibili Gaming
1st All-Pro Team	JackeyLove	Top Esports
1st All-Pro Team	Kael	Anyone's Legend
2nd All-Pro Team
2nd All-Pro Team	Flandre	Anyone's Legend
2nd All-Pro Team	Tarzan	Anyone's Legend
2nd All-Pro Team	Shanks	Anyone's Legend
2nd All-Pro Team	Peyz	JD Gaming
2nd All-Pro Team	ON	Bilibili Gaming
3rd All-Pro Team
3rd All-Pro Team	TheShy	Invictus Gaming
3rd All-Pro Team	Xun	JD Gaming
3rd All-Pro Team	Scout	JD Gaming
3rd All-Pro Team	Hope	Anyone's Legend
3rd All-Pro Team	Crisp	Top Esports

== Split 3 ==
=== Format ===
In Split 3, the remaining fourteen (14) teams entered the rumble stage. The teams that played in the Split 2 Playoffs will automatically be placed in "Group Ascend", while the remaining six (6) teams were placed in "Group Nirvana". Each team in their respective groups are playing a double round-robin where all matches are being played in best-of-threes, with the top four (4) Ascend teams advancing to the playoffs and the bottom four of the same group advancing to the "Knights Rivals" stage. Meanwhile, the top four (4) Nirvana teams will also join the said stage, with the bottom two teams automatically eliminated.

Teams in the "Knights Rivals" Stage competed in best-of-five matches, with the winners advancing to the playoffs. The playoffs, much like Split 2, was contested in an eight-team Double-elimination tournament bracket, where all matches were played in best-of-fives. The top three teams that advanced from Group Ascend got to choose their opponents in the upper bracket while the fourth-ranked team played against the team that was not selected. The winner of Split 3 was crowned the Season Champion and secured qualification for the 2025 League of Legends World Championship.

Side selection for Game 1s w beas decided by a coinflip, where the winners picked their side for the first game, while the losing team will get to choose for the following game. When a series reached Game 5, the losing team in Game 4 got to choose.

=== Rumble Stage ===
Group Ascend

Pos	Team	Pld	W	L	PCT	Qualification
1	Top Esports	14	12	2	.857	Advance to Playoffs
2	Invictus Gaming	14	11	3	.786	Advance to Playoffs
3	Bilibili Gaming	14	10	4	.714	Advance to Playoffs
4	Anyone's Legend	14	8	6	.571	Advance to Playoffs
5	Weibo Gaming	14	6	8	.429	Advance to Knights Rivals
6	JD Gaming	14	5	9	.357	Advance to Knights Rivals
7	Team WE	14	3	11	.214	Advance to Knights Rivals
8	FunPlus Phoenix	14	1	13	.071	Advance to Knights Rivals

Updated to match(es) played on 28 August 2025. Source: LoL Esports

Group Nirvana

Pos	Team	Pld	W	L	PCT	Qualification
1	Ninjas in Pyjamas	10	9	1	.900	Advance to Knights Rivals
2	EDward Gaming	10	8	2	.800	Advance to Knights Rivals
3	LGD Gaming	10	6	4	.600	Advance to Knights Rivals
4	Ultra Prime	10	3	7	.300	Advance to Knights Rivals
5	LNG Esports	10	2	8	.200	Eliminated
6	TT Gaming	10	2	8	.200	Eliminated

Updated to match(es) played on 25 August 2025. Source: LoL Esports

=== Knights Rivals ===
- Venue: Yangcheng International Esports Center, Suzhou

Qualification Match 1
30 August
FunPlus Phoenix	2
Ninjas in Pyjamas	3

Qualification Match 2
31 August
Team WE	1
EDward Gaming	3

Qualification Match 3
1 September
Weibo Gaming	3
Ultra Prime	0

Qualification Match 4
2 September
JD Gaming	3
LGD Gaming	0

=== Playoffs ===
Venues:

- Buji Culture & Sports Center, Shenzhen
- Shenzhen Dayun Arena, Shenzhen (Lower Bracket Final and Finals)

Upper quarterfinals	Upper semifinals	Upper final	Final
7 September
Bilibili Gaming	3
9 September
JD Gaming	2
Bilibili Gaming	3
7 September
Invictus Gaming	1
Invictus Gaming	3
15 September
EDward Gaming	0
Bilibili Gaming	3
8 September
Top Esports	2
Anyone's Legend	2
10 September
Weibo Gaming	3
Weibo Gaming	1
8 September
Top Esports	3
Top Esports	3	21 September
Ninjas in Pyjamas	1	Bilibili Gaming	3
Top Esports	2
Lower round 1	Lower quarterfinals	Lower semifinal	Lower final
13 September
11 September	Weibo Gaming	1	20 September
JD Gaming	3	JD Gaming	3	16 September	Top Esports	3
EDward Gaming	2	JD Gaming	0	Anyone's Legend	1
14 September	Anyone's Legend	3
12 September	Invictus Gaming	0
Anyone's Legend	3	Anyone's Legend	3
Ninjas in Pyjamas	1

=== Awards ===
Award	Player	Team
Finals MVP	knight	Bilibili Gaming
Season MVP	JackeyLove	Top Esports
1st All-Pro Team
1st All-Pro Team	TheShy	Invictus Gaming
1st All-Pro Team	Kanavi	Top Esports
1st All-Pro Team	knight	Bilibili Gaming
1st All-Pro Team	JackeyLove	Top Esports
1st All-Pro Team	Hang	Top Esports
2nd All-Pro Team
2nd All-Pro Team	369	Top Esports
2nd All-Pro Team	Tarzan	Anyone's Legend
2nd All-Pro Team	Rookie	Invictus Gaming
2nd All-Pro Team	GALA	Invictus Gaming
2nd All-Pro Team	Meiko	Invictus Gaming

Award	Player	Team
3rd All-Pro Team
3rd All-Pro Team	Flandre	Anyone's Legend
3rd All-Pro Team	Wei	Invictus Gaming
3rd All-Pro Team	Creme	Top Esports
3rd All-Pro Team	Elk	Bilibili Gaming
3rd All-Pro Team	ON	Bilibili Gaming
Nirvana All-Pro Team
Nirvana All-Pro Team	Zdz	EDward Gaming
Nirvana All-Pro Team	Xiaohao	EDward Gaming
Nirvana All-Pro Team	Doinb	Ninjas in Pyjamas
Nirvana All-Pro Team	Leave	Ninjas in Pyjamas
Nirvana All-Pro Team	Parukia	EDward Gaming

== World Championship qualification ==
=== Championship points ===
Pos	Team	S1	S2	S3	Total	Qualification
1	Bilibili Gaming	10	70	AQ	AQ	2025 World Championship
2	Anyone's Legend	15	90	80	185	2025 World Championship
3	Top Esports	20	20	110	150	Advance to Regional Qualifier 3rd Seed Playoff
4	Invictus Gaming	5	50	40	95	Advance to Regional Qualifier 3rd Seed Playoff
5	JD Gaming	10	10	60	80	Advance to Regional Qualifier Elimination Match
6	Weibo Gaming	5	20	40	65	Advance to Regional Qualifier Elimination Match
7	Team WE	0	30	0	30	
8	Ninjas in Pyjamas	5	0	10	15	
9	EDward Gaming	0	0	10	10	
10	FunPlus Phoenix	0	10	0	10	
11	TT Esports	5	0	0	5	
12	LGD Gaming	0	0	0	0	
13	LNG Esports	0	0	0	0	
14	Ultra Prime	0	0	0	0	
15	Royal Never Give Up	0	0	N/A	0	
16	Oh My God	0	0	N/A	0	

=== Regional Qualifier ===
The regional qualifier was a tournament consisting of the top four teams in the LPL based on championship points that had not directly qualified for the 2025 World Championship. The top two teams faced off, and the winner earned a spot in the World Championship. The bottom two teams then played against each other, with the losing team being eliminated. The remaining two teams then competed for the last LPL spot in the 2025 World Championship. The three best-of-five matches were held over three consecutive days, from 25 to 27 September.

==== Bracket ====
Venue: Buji Culture & Sports Center, Shenzhen

Round 1
25 September
3	Top Esports	3
4	Invictus Gaming	1
26 September
5	JD Gaming	3
6	Weibo Gaming	1

4th Seed Playoff
27 September
4	Invictus Gaming	3
5	JD Gaming	1

Advance to Worlds
Top Esports
Invictus Gaming

Source: LoL Esports
