= 2025 League of Legends World Championship qualification =

Esports tournament qualification

Qualification for the 2025 League of Legends World Championship occurred between July to September 2025, allocating seventeen (17) teams for the final tournament. The five Tier 1 regional leagues were expected to have a representation at the tournament.

As the winner of the 2025 Mid-Season Invitational (MSI), Gen.G of the League of Legends Champions Korea (LCK) received an automatic slot in the tournament, provided it qualified for its league's playoffs; this was confirmed on 23 July 2025. By virtue of being the second best-performing region at MSI, China's League of Legends Pro League (LPL) also earned an additional slot to the World Championship.

Outside of the berths from MSI, the five regional leagues – League of Legends Champions Korea (LCK), League of Legends Pro League (LPL), League of Legends EMEA Championship (LEC), League of Legends Championship of The Americas (LTA), and League of Legends Championship Pacific (LCP) produced three (3) qualified teams each.

== Method ==
Seventeen teams participated in the World Championship, with each team sending a roster of five players. A team was allowed a maximum of two substitute players.

=== Qualification via Regional Leagues ===
In line with Riot Games' announcement of a new international tournament allocation per region beginning with the 2025 competitive season, each of the five regional leagues distributed three (3) quotas each to the best-performing teams, making a total of fifteen (15) berths.

As qualification to Worlds was part of the regional league season, namely the third split, each league decided its own formats and qualification methods. The LPL was the only league to qualify teams for the tournament via the championship points system and a regional qualifier bracket.

=== Qualification via Mid-Season Invitational ===
The remaining two slots were attributed to results gained at the 2025 Mid-Season Invitational, with the winning team earning a berth to the World Championship, provided it reached the playoffs of its region's third split. Meanwhile, the second best-performing region at MSI also received an additional berth.

== Qualified teams ==
Qualification	Host	Dates	Qualified
Winner of the 2025 Mid-Season Invitational	(Canada) Vancouver	26 June–12 July	Gen.G
Top Three of the 2025 LCP Season Finals Playoffs	(Taiwan) Taipei (Vietnam) Da Nang	5–21 September	CTBC Flying Oyster; Secret Whales; PSG Talon
Winner of the 2025 LPL season 2025 LPL Championship Points Leader; Winners of the 2025 LPL Regional Qualifiers	(China) Shenzhen	7–27 September	Bilibili Gaming; Anyone's Legend; Top Esports; Invictus Gaming
Top Three of the 2025 LEC Summer Split Playoffs	(Germany) Berlin (Spain) Madrid	7–28 September	G2 Esports; Movistar KOI; Fnatic
2025 LTA Conference Champions; Top Three of the 2025 LTA Playoffs	(United States) Los Angeles (Brazil) São Paulo (United States) Dallas	7–28 September	FlyQuest; Vivo Keyd Stars; 100 Thieves
Top 2-4 of the 2025 LCK Playoffs (Note: Gen.G won the 2025 LCK championship but formally qualified as the winner of MSI 2025 prior to the playoffs.)	(South Korea) Seoul (South Korea) Incheon	10–28 September	Hanwha Life Esports; KT Rolster; T1

== Qualification matches ==
Qualification matches did not necessarily determine the seeding of each team for the tournament

=== MSI 2025 ===
Since 2024, the MSI Champion is assured of a spot at the League of Legends World Championship provided it qualified for its region's playoffs during the third split. Gen.G's victory over T1 reserved its spot in the tournament, but was not formalized yet due to the above-mentioned condition.

Gen.G vs T1 | Final

July 12	Gen.G	3	–	2	T1	Vancouver, Canada
17:00 (UTC-8)						Pacific Coliseum
	K/D/A: 6/17/18; Gold: 55.4K; Turrets: 3 Drakes: 3 Elder Dragons: 0 Barons: 0 Rift Heralds: 0 Voidgrubs: 2	Game 1; 34:24; T1 leads series 1–0			K/D/A: 17/6/53; Gold: 67.7K; Turrets: 10; Drakes: 2 Elder Dragons: 0 Barons: 2 Rift Heralds: 1 Voidgrubs: 1	
	K/D/A: 24/10/59; Gold: 62.1K; Turrets: 8 Drakes: 4 Elder Dragons: 0 Barons: 1 Rift Heralds: 1 Voidgrubs: 1	Game 2; 30:29; Series tied 1–1			K/D/A: 10/24/26; Gold: 49.0K; Turrets: 1 Drakes: 1 Elder Dragons: 0 Barons: 0 Rift Heralds: 0 Voidgrubs: 2	
	K/D/A: 2/20/4; Gold: 41.6K; Turrets: 1 Drakes: 0 Elder Dragons: 0 Barons: 0 Rift Heralds: 0 Voidgrubs: 2	Game 3; 27:33; T1 leads series 2–1			K/D/A: 20/2/49; Gold: 55.1K; Turrets: 9 Drakes: 4 Elder Dragons: 0 Barons: 1 Rift Heralds: 1 Voidgrubs: 1	
	K/D/A: 13/3/36; Gold: 53.9K; Turrets: 8 Drakes: 2 Elder Dragons: 0 Barons: 1 Rift Heralds: 1 Voidgrubs: 1	Game 4; 26:57; Series tied 2–2			K/D/A: 3/13/5; Gold: 41.8K; Turrets: 2 Drakes: 2 Elder Dragons: 0 Barons: 0 Rift Heralds: 0 Voidgrubs: 2	
	K/D/A: 15/4/39; Gold: 72.9K; Turrets: 10; Drakes: 4 Elder Dragons: 0 Barons: 2 Rift Heralds: 1 Voidgrubs: 0	Game 5; 35:20; GEN wins series 3–2			K/D/A: 4/15/9; Gold: 58.5K; Turrets: 3 Drakes: 1 Elder Dragons: 0 Barons: 0 Rift Heralds: 0 Voidgrubs: 3	

=== LCK ===
Gen.G vs Hanwha Life Esports | Round 3

Gen.G's were on a streak of 26 consecutive victories in best-of series prior to their first game in Rounds 3–5. With their 2–0 win over Hanwha Life Esports, the team qualified for the LCK Playoffs, meeting the conditions for qualifying for the World Championship as the MSI winner.

July 23	Gen.G	2	–	0	Hanwha Life Esports	Seoul, South Korea
19:00 (UTC+9)						LoL Park
	K/D/A: 19/7/48; Gold: 59.7K; Turrets: 8 Drakes: 2 Elder Dragons: 0 Barons: 1 Rift Heralds: 1 Voidgrubs: 2	Game 1; 28:36; GEN leads series 1–0			K/D/A: 7/19/19; Gold: 47.7K; Turrets: 2 Drakes: 2 Elder Dragons: 0 Barons: 0 Rift Heralds: 0 Voidgrubs: 1	
	K/D/A: 24/17/68; Gold: 82.9K; Turrets: 8 Drakes: 4 Elder Dragons: 0 Barons: 1 Rift Heralds: 0 Voidgrubs: 1	Game 2; 43:07; GEN wins series 2–0			K/D/A: 17/24/44; Gold: 77.3K; Turrets: 3 Drakes: 3 Elder Dragons: 0 Barons: 1 Rift Heralds: 1 Voidgrubs: 2	

Gen.G vs KT Rolster | Upper Bracket Round 2

KT Rolster was selected by Gen.G to be their opponents in the second round of the LCK playoffs, by virtue of being the first seed. After trailing the series, 1–2, KT scored two consecutive victories to pull off an upset victory and qualify for their fourth World Championship.

September 13	Gen.G	2	–	3	KT Rolster	Seoul, South Korea
15:00 (UTC+9)						LoL Park
	K/D/A: 3/18/7; Gold: 48.3K; Turrets: 1 Drakes: 1 Elder Dragons: 0 Barons: 0 Rift Heralds: 0 Voidgrubs: 2	Game 1; 29:08; KT leads series 1–0			K/D/A: 18/3/41; Gold: 57.7K; Turrets: 6 Drakes: 3 Elder Dragons: 0 Barons: 1 Rift Heralds: 1 Voidgrubs: 1	
	K/D/A: 18/14/37; Gold: 73.7K; Turrets: 8 Drakes: 4 Elder Dragons: 0 Barons: 0 Rift Heralds: 1 Voidgrubs: 3	Game 2; 38:32; Series tied 1–1			K/D/A: 14/18/38; Gold: 66.3K; Turrets: 3 Drakes: 2 Elder Dragons: 0 Barons: 1 Rift Heralds: 0 Voidgrubs: 0	
	K/D/A: 21/6/55; Gold: 69.4K; Turrets: 11; Drakes: 2 Elder Dragons: 0 Barons: 1 Rift Heralds: 0 Voidgrubs: 0	Game 3; 32:49; GEN leads series 2–1			K/D/A: 6/21/14; Gold: 53.4K; Turrets: 0 Drakes: 3 Elder Dragons: 0 Barons: 0 Rift Heralds: 1 Voidgrubs: 3	
	K/D/A: 8/21/19; Gold: 63.8K; Turrets: 2 Drakes: 1 Elder Dragons: 0 Barons: 0 Rift Heralds: 1 Voidgrubs: 0	Game 4; 38:02; Series tied 2–2			K/D/A: 21/8/51; Gold: 70.4K; Turrets: 7 Drakes: 4 Elder Dragons: 1 Barons: 0 Rift Heralds: 0 Voidgrubs: 3	
	K/D/A: 10/25/26; Gold: 78.4K; Turrets: 5 Drakes: 2 Elder Dragons: 0 Barons: 1 Rift Heralds: 0 Voidgrubs: 3	Game 5; 41:41; KT wins series 3–2			K/D/A: 25/10/76; Gold: 81.0K; Turrets: 8 Drakes: 4 Elder Dragons: 1 Barons: 1 Rift Heralds: 1 Voidgrubs: 0	

Hanwha Life Esports vs T1 | Upper Bracket Round 2

T1 had won the last four matches against Hanwha Life Esports prior to the match, but HLE would break their losing streak in a 3–0 sweep to clich their spot at the League of Legends World Championship for the fifth time and the third under the Hanwha Life banner. The team's first two appearances in 2015 and 2016 were under the KOO Tigers and ROX Tigers names, respectively.

September 14	Hanwha Life Esports	3	–	0	T1	Seoul, South Korea
15:00 (UTC+9)						LoL Park
	K/D/A: 26/12/70; Gold: 70.3K; Turrets: 7 Drakes: 3 Elder Dragons: 0 Barons: 2 Rift Heralds: 1 Voidgrubs: 1	Game 1; 36:10; HLE leads series 1–0			K/D/A: 12/26/32; Gold: 62.5K; Turrets: 2 Drakes: 3 Elder Dragons: 0 Barons: 0 Rift Heralds: 0 Voidgrubs: 2	
	K/D/A: 20/9/39; Gold: 78.1K; Turrets: 8 Drakes: 4 Elder Dragons: 0 Barons: 1 Rift Heralds: 0 Voidgrubs: 0	Game 2; 40:45; HLE leads series 2–0			K/D/A: 9/20/23; Gold: 68.7K; Turrets: 2 Drakes: 2 Elder Dragons: 0 Barons: 1 Rift Heralds: 1 Voidgrubs: 3	
	K/D/A: 17/10/40; Gold: 61.8K; Turrets: 9 Drakes: 2 Elder Dragons: 0 Barons: 1 Rift Heralds: 0 Voidgrubs: 0	Game 3; 30:55; HLE wins series 3–0			K/D/A: 10/17/29; Gold: 53.8K; Turrets: 3 Drakes: 3 Elder Dragons: 0 Barons: 0 Rift Heralds: 1 Voidgrubs: 3	

T1 vs Dplus KIA | Lower Bracket Round 2

Defending champions T1 qualified for their record-extending 10th appearance at the League of Legends World Championship.

September 18	T1	3	–	1	Dplus KIA	Seoul, South Korea
17:00 (UTC+9)						LoL Park
	K/D/A: 6/16/11; Gold: 48.4K; Turrets: 2 Drakes: 1 Elder Dragons: 0 Barons: 0 Rift Heralds: 0 Voidgrubs: 1	Game 1; 30:20; DK leads series 1–0			K/D/A: 16/6/45; Gold: 60.4K; Turrets: 9 Drakes: 3 Elder Dragons: 0 Barons: 1 Rift Heralds: 1 Voidgrubs: 2	
	K/D/A: 20/12/68; Gold: 70.9K; Turrets: 10; Drakes: 2 Elder Dragons: 0 Barons: 2 Rift Heralds: 1 Voidgrubs: 2	Game 2; 34:43; Series tied 1–1			K/D/A: 12/20/33; Gold: 60.4K; Turrets: 2 Drakes: 3 Elder Dragons: 0 Barons: 0 Rift Heralds: 0 Voidgrubs: 1	
	K/D/A: 23/6/49; Gold: 58.6K; Turrets: 7 Drakes: 3 Elder Dragons: 0 Barons: 1 Rift Heralds: 0 Voidgrubs: 0	Game 3; 28:33; T1 leads series 2–1			K/D/A: 6/23/13; Gold: 47.5K; Turrets: 2 Drakes: 0 Elder Dragons: 0 Barons: 0 Rift Heralds: 1 Voidgrubs: 3	
	K/D/A: 25/11/52; Gold: 72.6K; Turrets: 10; Drakes: 4 Elder Dragons: 0 Barons: 1 Rift Heralds: 1 Voidgrubs: 0	Game 4; 33:50; T1 wins series 3–1			K/D/A: 11/25/25; Gold: 59.0K; Turrets: 2 Drakes: 1 Elder Dragons: 0 Barons: 0 Rift Heralds: 0 Voidgrubs: 3	

=== LCP ===
CTBC Flying Oyster vs Team Secret Whales | Upper Bracket Round 2

CTBC Flying Oyster qualified for its third World Championship in only its fourth year as an organization, and became the only team to qualify for all three international League of Legends competitions in 2025, as they qualified for both First Stand and the Mid-Season Invitational in the same year.

September 6	CTBC Flying Oyster	2	–	1	Secret Whales	Taipei, Taiwan
17:30 (UTC+8)						LCP Arena
	K/D/A: 9/25/17; Gold: 57.3K; Turrets: 3 Drakes: 0 Elder Dragons: 0 Barons: 0 Rift Heralds: 1 Voidgrubs: 1	Game 1; 33:45; TSW leads series 1–0			K/D/A: 25/9/65; Gold: 68.8K; Turrets: 7 Drakes: 4 Elder Dragons: 0 Barons: 1 Rift Heralds: 0 Voidgrubs: 2	
	K/D/A: 12/10/31; Gold: 68.8K; Turrets: 9 Drakes: 2 Elder Dragons: 0 Barons: 2 Rift Heralds: 1 Voidgrubs: 3	Game 2; 36:00; Series tied 1–1			K/D/A: 10/12/34; Gold: 59.7K; Turrets: 1 Drakes: 3 Elder Dragons: 0 Barons: 0 Rift Heralds: 0 Voidgrubs: 0	
	K/D/A: 13/1/38; Gold: 64.1K; Turrets: 10; Drakes: 3 Elder Dragons: 0 Barons: 1 Rift Heralds: 1 Voidgrubs: 1	Game 3; 30:49; CFO wins series 2–1			K/D/A: 1/13/4; Gold: 47.4K; Turrets: 0 Drakes: 1 Elder Dragons: 0 Barons: 0 Rift Heralds: 0 Voidgrubs: 2	

GAM Esports vs PSG Talon | Upper Bracket Round 2

PSG Talon advanced to its fifth World Championship and eventually its last due to the organization being removed from the LCP prior to the 2026 season due to financial insecurity and failing to pay its players and coaches in a timely manner.

September 6	GAM Esports	0	–	2	PSG Talon	Taipei, Taiwan
20:00 (UTC+8)						LCP Arena
	K/D/A: 11/17/34; Gold: 67.9K; Turrets: 4 Drakes: 2 Elder Dragons: 0 Barons: 0 Rift Heralds: 1 Voidgrubs: 2	Game 1; 38:56; PSG leads series 1–0			K/D/A: 17/11/51; Gold: 73.0K; Turrets: 9 Drakes: 3 Elder Dragons: 0 Barons: 2 Rift Heralds: 0 Voidgrubs: 1	
	K/D/A: 10/22/28; Gold: 55.2K; Turrets: 3 Drakes: 1 Elder Dragons: 0 Barons: 1 Rift Heralds: 1 Voidgrubs: 3	Game 2; 30:13; PSG wins series 2–0			K/D/A: 22/10/61; Gold: 59.5K; Turrets: 7 Drakes: 3 Elder Dragons: 0 Barons: 0 Rift Heralds: 0 Voidgrubs: 0	

GAM Esports vs Team Secret Whales | Lower Bracket Round 3

Secret Whales qualified for its third World Championship and the first under the current name, as the team previously participated in the 2019 edition as "Lowkey Esports" before the acquisition of the latter's spot in the former Vietnam Championship Series (VCS) by Team Secret, previously participated in the 2023 edition, who eventually forged a partnership with Team Whales in late 2024. The loss also broke GAM Esports' streak of three consecutive appearances at the tournament.

September 14	GAM Esports	0	–	3	Secret Whales	Taipei, Taiwan
17:30 (UTC+8)						LCP Arena
	K/D/A: 6/22/15; Gold: 49.0K; Turrets: 2 Drakes: 1 Elder Dragons: 0 Barons: 0 Rift Heralds: 0 Voidgrubs: 1	Game 1; 29:42; TSW leads series 1–0			K/D/A: 22/6/65; Gold: 62.1K; Turrets: 8 Drakes: 4 Elder Dragons: 0 Barons: 1 Rift Heralds: 1 Voidgrubs: 2	
	K/D/A: 8/28/20; Gold: 48.3K; Turrets: 1 Drakes: 0 Elder Dragons: 0 Barons: 0 Rift Heralds: 1 Voidgrubs: 1	Game 2; 28:24; TSW leads series 2–0			K/D/A: 28/8/75; Gold: 63.9K; Turrets: 9 Drakes: 4 Elder Dragons: 0 Barons: 1 Rift Heralds: 0 Voidgrubs: 2	
	K/D/A: 14/23/39; Gold: 53.2K; Turrets: 2 Drakes: 2 Elder Dragons: 0 Barons: 0 Rift Heralds: 0 Voidgrubs: 1	Game 3; 30:16; TSW wins series 3–0			K/D/A: 23/14/68; Gold: 63.6K; Turrets: 10; Drakes: 2 Elder Dragons: 0 Barons: 1 Rift Heralds: 1 Voidgrubs: 2	

=== LEC ===
G2 Esports vs Karmine Corp | Upper Bracket Round 1

Despite Karmine Corp taking the first game, G2 Esports would win three consecutive games to win the series and advance to its ninth League of Legends World Championship since 2016, with their only absence being in 2021.

September 7	G2 Esports	3	–	1	Karmine Corp	Berlin, Germany
17:00 (UTC+2)						Riot Games Arena
	K/D/A: 9/16/20; Gold: 56.9K; Turrets: 2 Drakes: 2 Elder Dragons: 0 Barons: 0 Rift Heralds: 0 Voidgrubs: 0	Game 1; 35:00; KC leads series 1–0			K/D/A: 16/9/46; Gold: 67.6K; Turrets: 9 Drakes: 3 Elder Dragons: 0 Barons: 2 Rift Heralds: 1 Voidgrubs: 3	
	K/D/A: 15/7/49; Gold: 58.5K; Turrets: 11; Drakes: 2 Elder Dragons: 0 Barons: 1 Rift Heralds: 1 Voidgrubs: 1	Game 2; 29:27; Series tied 1–1			K/D/A: 7/15/15; Gold: 49.6K; Turrets: 2 Drakes: 2 Elder Dragons: 0 Barons: 0 Rift Heralds: 0 Voidgrubs: 2	
	K/D/A: 9/5/22; Gold: 55.6K; Turrets: 9 Drakes: 4 Elder Dragons: 0 Barons: 1 Rift Heralds: 0 Voidgrubs: 1	Game 3; 29:17; G2 leads series 2–1			K/D/A: 5/9/14; Gold: 49.2K; Turrets: 2 Drakes: 0 Elder Dragons: 0 Barons: 0 Rift Heralds: 1 Voidgrubs: 2	
	K/D/A: 13/3/27; Gold: 61.2K; Turrets: 11; Drakes: 4 Elder Dragons: 0 Barons: 1 Rift Heralds: 1 Voidgrubs: 2	Game 4; 31:50; G2 wins series 3–1			K/D/A: 3/13/4; Gold: 51.1K; Turrets: 2 Drakes: 1 Elder Dragons: 0 Barons: 0 Rift Heralds: 0 Voidgrubs: 1	

Movistar KOI vs Fnatic | Upper Bracket Round 1

Following the merger between MAD Lions, Movistar Riders, and KOI, the former MAD Lions was renamed to Movistar KOI ahead of the 2025 LEC season. After a five-game series, the team qualified for its eighth World Championship and the first under its new name.

September 8	Movistar KOI	3	–	2	Fnatic	Berlin, Germany
17:00 (UTC+2)						Riot Games Arena
	K/D/A: 12/20/37; Gold: 72.4K; Turrets: 4 Drakes: 2 Elder Dragons: 0 Barons: 0 Rift Heralds: 1 Voidgrubs: 0	Game 1; 42:40; FNC leads series 1–0			K/D/A: 20/12/54; Gold: 83.1K; Turrets: 10; Drakes: 4 Elder Dragons: 0 Barons: 2 Rift Heralds: 0 Voidgrubs: 3	
	K/D/A: 20/10/50; Gold: 62.0K; Turrets: 8 Drakes: 3 Elder Dragons: 0 Barons: 0 Rift Heralds: 1 Voidgrubs: 0	Game 2; 30:58; Series tied 1–1			K/D/A: 10/20/19; Gold: 51.9K; Turrets: 2 Drakes: 1 Elder Dragons: 0 Barons: 0 Rift Heralds: 0 Voidgrubs: 3	
	K/D/A: 15/11/38; Gold: 73.3K; Turrets: 13; Drakes: 2 Elder Dragons: 0 Barons: 2 Rift Heralds: 0 Voidgrubs: 1	Game 3; 35:19; MKOI leads series 2–1			K/D/A: 11/15/19; Gold: 61.4K; Turrets: 2 Drakes: 3 Elder Dragons: 0 Barons: 0 Rift Heralds: 1 Voidgrubs: 2	
	K/D/A: 9/17/18; Gold: 54.5K; Turrets: 4 Drakes: 0 Elder Dragons: 0 Barons: 0 Rift Heralds: 1 Voidgrubs: 2	Game 4; 30:19; Series tied 2–2			K/D/A: 17/9/52; Gold: 58.4K; Turrets: 6 Drakes: 4 Elder Dragons: 0 Barons: 1 Rift Heralds: 0 Voidgrubs: 1	
	K/D/A: 21/13/55; Gold: 74.3K; Turrets: 10; Drakes: 4 Elder Dragons: 0 Barons: 2 Rift Heralds: 1 Voidgrubs: 0	Game 5; 36:37; MKOI wins series 3–2			K/D/A: 13/21/24; Gold: 63.6K; Turrets: 2 Drakes: 2 Elder Dragons: 0 Barons: 0 Rift Heralds: 0 Voidgrubs: 3	

Fnatic vs Karmine Corp | Lower Bracket Round 2

Fnatic qualified for its record-extending 13th League of Legends World Championship, continuing its active streak of ten consecutive appearances.

September 26	Fnatic	3	–	1	Karmine Corp	Madrid, Spain
17:00 (UTC+2)						Caja Mágica
	K/D/A: 13/4/39; Gold: 73.5K; Turrets: 7 Drakes: 4 Elder Dragons: 0 Barons: 0 Rift Heralds: 0 Voidgrubs: 0	Game 1; 39:01; FNC leads series 1–0			K/D/A: 4/13/10; Gold: 66.7K; Turrets: 3 Drakes: 1 Elder Dragons: 0 Barons: 1 Rift Heralds: 1 Voidgrubs: 3	
	K/D/A: 15/7/48; Gold: 64.6K; Turrets: 9 Drakes: 3 Elder Dragons: 0 Barons: 1 Rift Heralds: 0 Voidgrubs: 2	Game 2; 33:22; FNC leads series 2–0			K/D/A: 7/15/14; Gold: 54.6K; Turrets: 2 Drakes: 2 Elder Dragons: 0 Barons: 0 Rift Heralds: 1 Voidgrubs: 1	
	K/D/A: 13/20/29; Gold: 70.9K; Turrets: 6 Drakes: 0 Elder Dragons: 1 Barons: 1 Rift Heralds: 0 Voidgrubs: 0	Game 3; 36:57; FNC leads series 2–1			K/D/A: 20/13/51; Gold: 71.2K; Turrets: 11; Drakes: 4 Elder Dragons: 0 Barons: 1 Rift Heralds: 1 Voidgrubs: 3	
	K/D/A: 12/3/25; Gold: 58.4K; Turrets: 7 Drakes: 4 Elder Dragons: 0 Barons: 0 Rift Heralds: 1 Voidgrubs: 3	Game 4; 30:41; FNC wins series 3–1			K/D/A: 3/12/8; Gold: 51.3K; Turrets: 2 Drakes: 1 Elder Dragons: 0 Barons: 0 Rift Heralds: 0 Voidgrubs: 0	

=== LPL ===
Anyone's Legend's qualification was confirmed on 21 September, which was their first as an organization, by having the most number of championship points aside from Bilibili Gaming, who won the 2025 LPL championship. Thus, AL didn't specifically had a series that would qualify them for the World Championship if they won.

Bilibili Gaming vs Top Esports | Upper Bracket Final

2024 runners-up Bilibili Gaming advanced to its third World Championship after the 2023 and 2024 editions, and the second-straight edition as the LPL's first seed after the winning the LPL finals.

September 15	Bilibili Gaming	3	–	2	Top Esports	Shenzhen, China
17:00 (UTC+8)						Buji Culture & Sports Center
	----	Game 1; 36:36; BLG leads series 1–0			----	
	----	Game 2; 39:05; Series tied 1–1			----	
	----	Game 3; 26:28; TES leads series 2–1			----	
	----	Game 4; 28:38; Series tied 2–2			----	
		Game 5; 30:21; BLG wins series 3–2				

Top Esports vs Invictus Gaming | Regional Qualifier 3rd Seed Playoff

Both Top Esports and Invictus Gaming qualified for the 3rd seed playoff by virtue of placing third and fourth, respectively, in the championship points ranking. With their 3–1 win, Top Esports secured its spot at the World Championship for the fourth time and Invictus Gaming was relegated to the 4th seed playoff.

September 25	Top Esports	3	–	1	Invictus Gaming	Shenzhen, China
17:00 (UTC+8)						Buji Culture & Sports Center
	----	Game 1; 31:53; TES leads series 1–0			----	
	----	Game 2; 27:02; TES leads series 2–0			----	
	----	Game 3; 33:42; TES leads series 2–1			----	
		Game 4; 31:14; TES wins series 3–1				

Invictus Gaming vs JD Gaming | Regional Qualifier 4th Seed Playoff

JD Gaming advanced to the 4th seed playoff after winning its elimination series against sixth seed Weibo Gaming. With their 3–1 victory, Invictus Gaming qualified for its fifth World Championship after a five year drought since its last appearance in 2019.

September 27	Invictus Gaming	3	–	1	JD Gaming	Shenzhen, China
17:00 (UTC+8)						Buji Culture & Sports Center
	----	Game 1; 28:50; JDG leads series 1–0			----	
	----	Game 2; 35:36; Series tied 1–1			----	
	----	Game 3; 29:29; IG leads series 2–1			----	
		Game 4; 29:37; IG wins series 3–1				

=== LTA ===
Vivo Keyd Stars vs RED Canids Kalunga | South Conference Finals

Vivo Keyd Stars qualified for its first World Championship appearance and ended up being the only team from the LTA South to be featured in the tournament.

September 7	Vivo Keyd Stars	3	–	0	RED Canids Kalunga	São Paulo, Brazil
17:00 (UTC-3)						Riot Games Arena
	K/D/A: 24/3/52; Gold: 61.6K; Turrets: 10; Drakes: 3 Elder Dragons: 0 Barons: 1 Rift Heralds: 0 Voidgrubs: 0	Game 1; 28:50; VKS leads series 1–0			K/D/A: 3/24/10; Gold: 46.2K; Turrets: 2 Drakes: 0 Elder Dragons: 0 Barons: 0 Rift Heralds: 1 Voidgrubs: 3	
	K/D/A: 25/5/54; Gold: 59.9K; Turrets: 10; Drakes: 3 Elder Dragons: 0 Barons: 1 Rift Heralds: 1 Voidgrubs: 3	Game 2; 28:04; VKS leads series 2–0			K/D/A: 5/26/12; Gold: 44.2K; Turrets: 1 Drakes: 1 Elder Dragons: 0 Barons: 0 Rift Heralds: 0 Voidgrubs: 0	
	K/D/A: 29/21/70; Gold: 93.8K; Turrets: 11; Drakes: 4 Elder Dragons: 0 Barons: 2 Rift Heralds: 1 Voidgrubs: 2	Game 3; 47:48; VKS wins series 3–0			K/D/A: 21/29/53; Gold: 86.5K; Turrets: 8 Drakes: 3 Elder Dragons: 0 Barons: 0 Rift Heralds: 0 Voidgrubs: 1	

FlyQuest vs 100 Thieves | North Conference Finals

FlyQuest advanced to its third World Championship and its second consecutive after qualifying in 2024. The team's first appearance was at the 2020 edition.

September 7	FlyQuest	3	–	1	100 Thieves	Los Angeles, United States
13:00 (UTC-8)						Riot Games Arena
	K/D/A: 19/18/48; Gold: 71.9K; Turrets: 9 Drakes: 3 Elder Dragons: 0 Barons: 0 Rift Heralds: 1 Voidgrubs: 1	Game 1; 37:03; FLY leads series 1–0			K/D/A: 18/19/45; Gold: 67.9K; Turrets: 4 Drakes: 2 Elder Dragons: 0 Barons: 1 Rift Heralds: 0 Voidgrubs: 2	
	K/D/A: 7/18/19; Gold: 48.3K; Turrets: 2 Drakes: 2 Elder Dragons: 0 Barons: 0 Rift Heralds: 0 Voidgrubs: 3	Game 2; 29:27; Series tied 1–1			K/D/A: 18/7/50; Gold: 58.3K; Turrets: 8 Drakes: 2 Elder Dragons: 0 Barons: 1 Rift Heralds: 1 Voidgrubs: 0	
	K/D/A: 15/1/36; Gold: 64.7K; Turrets: 9 Drakes: 4 Elder Dragons: 0 Barons: 1 Rift Heralds: 1 Voidgrubs: 2	Game 3; 33:02; FLY leads series 2–1			K/D/A: 1/15/1; Gold: 51.2K; Turrets: 2 Drakes: 1 Elder Dragons: 0 Barons: 0 Rift Heralds: 0 Voidgrubs: 1	
	K/D/A: 27/12/64; Gold: 66.8K; Turrets: 10; Drakes: 3 Elder Dragons: 0 Barons: 1 Rift Heralds: 0 Voidgrubs: 3	Game 4; 31:10; FLY wins series 3–1			K/D/A: 12/27/26; Gold: 57.2K; Turrets: 3 Drakes: 1 Elder Dragons: 0 Barons: 0 Rift Heralds: 1 Voidgrubs: 0	

100 Thieves vs RED Canids Kalunga | Playoffs Lower Bracket Round 2

Despite its 0–3 win-loss record in the Pick and Play phase of the LTA North Split 3, 100 Thieves would win three consecutive series against Team Liquid, Cloud9 KIA, and Shopify Rebellion to qualify for the Conference Finals and the LTA Playoffs. After winning against LYON in the first round of the lower bracket, the team defeated RED Canids Kalunga to secure its final appearance at the League of Legends World Championship. On 19 July 2025, the organization announced its departure from competitive League after the 2025 season.

September 21	100 Thieves	3	–	0	RED Canids Kalunga	Los Angeles, United States
13:00 (UTC-8)						Riot Games Arena
	K/D/A: 24/8/61; Gold: 63.8K; Turrets: 10; Drakes: 4 Elder Dragons: 0 Barons: 0 Rift Heralds: 1 Voidgrubs: 3	Game 1; 30:42; 100 leads series 1–0			K/D/A: 8/24/21; Gold: 48.9K; Turrets: 1 Drakes: 0 Elder Dragons: 0 Barons: 0 Rift Heralds: 0 Voidgrubs: 0	
	K/D/A: 31/22/73; Gold: 76.7K; Turrets: 9 Drakes: 4 Elder Dragons: 0 Barons: 1 Rift Heralds: 1 Voidgrubs: 0	Game 2; 36:48; 100 leads series 2–0			K/D/A: 22/31/57; Gold: 61.8K; Turrets: 0 Drakes: 1 Elder Dragons: 0 Barons: 0 Rift Heralds: 0 Voidgrubs: 3	
	K/D/A: 18/8/39; Gold: 62.0K; Turrets: 8 Drakes: 3 Elder Dragons: 0 Barons: 1 Rift Heralds: 1 Voidgrubs: 2	Game 3; 30:40; 100 wins series 3–0			K/D/A: 8/18/18; Gold: 48.4K; Turrets: 0 Drakes: 1 Elder Dragons: 0 Barons: 0 Rift Heralds: 0 Voidgrubs: 1	

== Seeding ==
Teams' seeding for the World Championship was determined by their final rankings in the final split.

- LCK: Season Champions Gen.G became the first seed after beating Hanwha Life Esports in the Finals, while both T1 and KT Rolster earned the third and fourth seeds, respectively.
- LCP: Season Champions CTBC Flying Oyster clinched the region's first seed after beating Secret Whales in the Finals, while PSG Talon became the third seed after losing in the lower bracket final.
- LEC: Summer Split Champions G2 Esports earned the first seed after beating Movistar KOI, while the third seed was gained by Fnatic after losing in the lower bracket final.
- LPL: Bilibili Gaming won the 2025 LPL Championship against Top Esports, clinching the region's first seed in the process. Anyone's Legend clinched the second seed via having the most number of championship points outside of BLG, with the third and fourth seeds being determined by the regional qualifiers – Top Esports and Invictus Gaming, respectively.
- LTA: Conference Champions FlyQuest (LTA North) and Vivo Keyd Stars (LTA South) contested the region's first seed in the LTA Championship Finals, which FlyQuest won. 100 Thieves got the third seed after losing in the lower bracket final.
