= 2026 Esports World Cup – League of Legends =

League of Legends tournament at the 2026 Esports World Cup

League of Legends at the 2026 Esports World Cup
Tournament information
- Sport: League of Legends
- Location: Paris, France
- Dates: July 15–19
- Administrator: Esports World Cup Foundation; Supervised by ESL and sanctioned by Riot Games
- Tournament format(s): 16 team GSL-style group stage 8 team single-elimination bracket
- Teams: 16

Final positions
- Champion: Dplus KIA
- Runner-up: Karmine Corp
- MVP: Shin "Smash" Geum-jae (Dplus KIA)

The multiplayer online battle arena (MOBA) video game League of Legends had a tournament at the 2026 Esports World Cup in Paris, France, from July 15 to 19, 2026. Sixteen teams took part in this tournament – three each from the LCK (Korea), LEC (EMEA), and LPL (China), two each from the LCP (Asia-Pacific), LCS (North America), and CBLOL (South America), and the defending champions Gen.G.

It was the third League of Legends tournament at the EWC and the second under a three-year partnership between game developer Riot Games and the Esports World Cup Foundation to bring League of Legends, Valorant, and Teamfight Tactics into the event until 2027. Dplus KIA of the League of Legends Champions Korea (LCK) won the tournament, defeating Karmine Corp of the League of Legends EMEA Championship (LEC) 3–0 in the final.

== Format ==
In the group stage, all sixteen teams were divided into four groups of four and competed in a GSL-style group stage double-elimination bracket, with the top two teams in each group advancing to the playoffs. Opening matches and winners' matches in the group stage were best-of-ones, while elimination and decider matches were best-of-three.

In the playoffs, the teams that qualified through the group stage competed in an eight-team single-elimination bracket. Matches in the quarter-finals and semi-finals were best-of-three; the final was a best-of-five. The teams that lost in the semifinals competed in a third-place match.

== Qualification ==
2025 tournament winners Gen.G automatically qualified for the 2026 edition by virtue of being defending champions. The League of Legends Champions Korea (LCK), League of Legends Pro League (LPL), and League of Legends EMEA Championship (LEC) had three representatives each. The League of Legends Championship Pacific (LCP), League of Legends Championship Series (LCS), and Campeonato Brasileiro de League of Legends had two representatives each.

=== Qualified teams ===
Region	League	Team	Path
South Korea	LCK	Gen.G	EWC 2025 Champions
South Korea	LCK	Hanwha Life Esports	Road to MSI winner
South Korea	LCK	T1	EWC Online Qualifier
South Korea	LCK	Dplus KIA	EWC Online Qualifier (Note: Since Hanwha Life Esports already qualified before winning the Road to MSI, Dplus KIA qualified for the EWC by virtue of being the third best team, and will enter the group stage.)
EMEA	LEC	G2 Esports	Spring Split champion
EMEA	LEC	Karmine Corp	EWC Online Qualifier
EMEA	LEC	Movistar KOI	EWC Online Qualifier (Note: Since G2 Esports already qualified before winning the Spring Split, Movistar KOI qualified for the EWC by virtue of being the third best team, and will enter the group stage.)
China	LPL	Bilibili Gaming	Split 2 champion
China	LPL	AG.AL (Note: Due to the Esports World Cup requiring all divisions of a club to have unified branding for the Club Championship, Anyone's Legend played as AG.AL during the tournament, as they are part of the Chinese organization All Gamers.)	EWC Online Qualifier
China	LPL	JD Gaming	EWC Online Qualifier
Asia-Pacific	LCP	Team Secret (Note: Due to the Esports World Cup requiring all divisions of a club to have unified branding for the Club Championship, Team Secret Whales played as Team Secret during the tournament, as they are part of the European organization Team Secret.)	Split 2 champion
Asia-Pacific	LCP	GAM Esports	EWC Online Qualifier (Note: Since Team Secret already qualified before winning Split 2, GAM Esports qualified for the EWC by virtue of being the runner-up, and will enter the group stage.)
North America	LCS	LYON	Spring Split champions
North America	LCS	Sentinels	EWC Online Qualifier
South America	CBLOL	FURIA	Split 1 champion
South America	CBLOL	MIBR.LOS (Note: Due to the Esports World Cup requiring all divisions of a club to have unified branding for the Club Championship, LØS played as MIBR.LOS during the tournament, as they are part of the Brazilian organization Spun Midia.)	EWC Online Qualifier

== Draw ==
The results of the draw for the group stage were announced on 7 July 2026.

Group A	Group B	Group C	Group D
G2 Esports	Team Secret	Bilibili Gaming	Hanwha Life Esports
AG.AL	Gen.G	T1	LYON
Dplus KIA	Karmine Corp	GAM Esports	JD Gaming
FURIA	Sentinels	Movistar KOI	MIBR.LOS

== Group stage ==
- Dates: 15–16 July 2026
- Sixteen teams were drawn into four groups of four teams each. Teams from the same region cannot be placed in the same group.
- Double elimination; Opening matches and winners' matches are best-of-one; elimination and decider matches were best-of-three

=== Group A ===
Opening Match
15 July, 13:20 CEST
G2 Esports	1
FURIA	0
15 July, 13:20 CEST
Dplus KIA	0
AG.AL	1
Elimination Match
15 July, 18:10 CEST
FURIA	0
Dplus KIA	2

Winners Match
16 July, 12:10 CEST
G2 Esports	0
AG.AL	1
Decider Match
16 July, 15:50 CEST
G2 Esports	0
Dplus KIA	2

Playoffs Qualified
AG.AL
Dplus KIA

=== Group B ===
Opening Match
15 July, 11:00 CEST
Team Secret	0
Sentinels	1
15 July, 11:00 CEST
Gen.G	1
Karmine Corp	0
Elimination Match
15 July, 15:40 CEST
Team Secret	1
Karmine Corp	2

Winners Match
16 July, 11:00 CEST
Sentinels	0
Gen.G	1
Decider Match
16 July, 13:20 CEST
Sentinels	0
Karmine Corp	2

Playoffs Qualified
Gen.G
Karmine Corp

=== Group C ===
Opening Match
15 July, 12:10 CEST
Bilibili Gaming	1
Movistar KOI	0
15 July, 12:10 CEST
GAM Esports	0
T1	1
Elimination Match
15 July, 15:40 CEST
Movistar KOI	1
GAM Esports	2

Winners Match
16 July, 11:00 CEST
Bilibili Gaming	1
T1	0
Decider Match
16 July, 13:20 CEST
T1	2
GAM Esports	0

Playoffs Qualified
Bilibili Gaming
T1

=== Group D ===
Opening Match
15 July, 14:30 CEST
Hanwha Life Esports	1
MIBR.LOS	0
15 July, 14:30 CEST
JD Gaming	1
LYON	0
Elimination Match
15 July, 18:10 CEST
MIBR.LOS	2
LYON	0

Winners Match
16 July, 12:10 CEST
Hanwha Life Esports	1
JD Gaming	0
Decider Match
16 July, 15:50 CEST
JD Gaming	2
MIBR.LOS	0

Playoffs Qualified
Hanwha Life Esports
JD Gaming

== Playoffs ==
- Dates: 17–19 July 2026
- Matchups were determined by a draw
- Eight teams consisting of the top two teams from each group in the group stage
- Single elimination; matches in quarterfinals and semifinals are best-of-threes; final is best-of-five

Quarterfinals
17 July, 13:00 CEST
Hanwha Life Esports	0
T1	2
17 July, 15:30 CEST
AG.AL	0
Karmine Corp	2
17 July, 13:00 CEST
Gen.G	2
JD Gaming	0
17 July, 15:30 CEST
Bilibili Gaming	1
Dplus KIA	2

Semifinals
18 July, 13:00 CEST
T1	1
Karmine Corp	2
18 July, 15:30 CEST
Gen.G	1
Dplus KIA	2

Final
19 July, 14:30 CEST
Karmine Corp	0
Dplus KIA	3
Third place
19 July, 12:00 CEST
T1	1
Gen.G	2

== Ranking ==
The tournament had a total prize pool of US$2,000,000. It was distributed as shown below.

Place	Team	Region	Prize (%)	Prize (USD)
1st	Dplus KIA	LCK	30%	$600,000
2nd	Karmine Corp	LEC	17%	$340,000
3rd	Gen.G	LCK	11%	$220,000
4th	T1	LCK	7%	$140,000
5th–8th	AG.AL	LPL	4.5%	$90,000
5th–8th	Bilibili Gaming	LPL	4.5%	$90,000
5th–8th	Hanwha Life Esports	LCK	4.5%	$90,000
5th–8th	JD Gaming	LPL	4.5%	$90,000
9th–12th	G2 Esports	LEC	2.75%	$55,000
9th–12th	Sentinels	LCS	2.75%	$55,000
9th–12th	GAM Esports	LCP	2.75%	$55,000
9th–12th	MIBR.LOS	CBLOL	2.75%	$55,000
13th–16th	FURIA	CBLOL	1.5%	$30,000
13th–16th	Team Secret	LCP	1.5%	$30,000
13th–16th	Movistar KOI	LEC	1.5%	$30,000
13th–16th	LYON	LCS	1.5%	$30,000
