= 2025 Esports World Cup – League of Legends =

League of Legends tournament at the 2025 Esports World Cup

League of Legends at the 2025 Esports World Cup
Tournament information
- Sport: League of Legends
- Location: Riyadh, Saudi Arabia
- Dates: July 16–20
- Administrator: Esports World Cup Foundation; Supervised by ESL and sanctioned by Riot Games
- Tournament format(s): 8 team GSL-style group stage 8 team single-elimination bracket
- Teams: 12

Final positions
- Champion: Gen.G
- Runner-up: AG.AL
- MVP: Kim "Kiin" Gi-in (Gen.G)

The multiplayer online battle arena (MOBA) video game League of Legends had a tournament at the 2025 Esports World Cup in Riyadh, Saudi Arabia, from July 16 to 20, 2025. Twelve teams took part in this tournament – three from the LTA (Americas), two each from the LCK (Korea), LCP (Asia-Pacific), LEC (EMEA) and LPL (China), and the defending champions T1. Teams qualified based on their qualification for the 2025 Mid-Season Invitational (MSI) through their placement within their regional leagues, with their seeding in the EWC tournament being determined by their performance at MSI.

It was the second League of Legends tournament at the EWC and the first under a three-year partnership between game developer Riot Games and the Esports World Cup Foundation to bring League of Legends, Valorant, and Teamfight Tactics into the event until 2027. Gen.G of the League of Legends Champions Korea (LCK) won the tournament, defeating AG.AL of the League of Legends Pro League (LPL) 3–2 in the final.

== Format ==
In the group stage, the eight teams (the six teams that finished from 5th to 10th during the 2025 Mid-Season Invitational and the two teams did not qualify for MSI) were divided into two groups of four and will compete in a GSL-style group stage double-elimination bracket, with the top two teams in each group advancing to the playoffs. All matches in the group stage were best-of-ones.

In the playoffs, the teams that qualified through the group stage joined the top four teams from MSI 2025 to compete in an eight-team single-elimination bracket. Matches in the quarter-finals and semi-finals are best-of-three; the final will be a best-of-five. The teams that lost in the semifinals will compete in a third-place match. All playoff matches will be best-of-threes, but the final will be a best-of-five.

== Qualification ==
2024 tournament winners T1 automatically qualified for the 2025 edition by virtue of being defending champions. The League of Legends Champions Korea (LCK), League of Legends Pro League (LPL), League of Legends EMEA Championship (LEC), and the League of Legends Championship Pacific (LCP) will have two representatives each, all of whom are qualified teams for MSI 2025. The League of Legends Championship of The Americas (LTA) will have three representatives – the top two teams from the North Conference and the South Conference champions – all from Split 2.

=== Qualified teams ===
Region	League	Team	Path	MSI Result	Qualified Phase
South Korea	LCK	T1	EWC 2024 Champions; Road to MSI Qualification Match 2 winner	2nd	Playoffs
South Korea	LCK	Gen.G	Road to MSI Qualification Match 1 winner	1st	Playoffs
South Korea	LCK	Hanwha Life Esports	Road to MSI third-ranked team (Note: Since T1 already qualified before winning the second qualification match of Road to MSI, Hanwha Life Esports qualified for the EWC by virtue of being the third best team, and will enter the group stage.)	DNQ	Group Stage
Asia-Pacific	LCP	CTBC Flying Oyster	Mid-Season Qualifying Series finalists	6th	Group Stage
Asia-Pacific	LCP	GAM Esports	Mid-Season Qualifying Series finalists	9th	Group Stage
EMEA	LEC	G2 Esports	Spring Split finalists	8th	Group Stage
EMEA	LEC	Movistar KOI	Spring Split finalists	7th	Group Stage
China	LPL	AG.AL (Note: Due to the Esports World Cup requiring all divisions of a club to have unified branding for the Club Championship, Anyone's Legend played as AG.AL during the tournament, as they are part of the Chinese organization All Gamers.)	Stage 2 finalists	3rd	Playoffs
China	LPL	Bilibili Gaming	Stage 2 finalists	4th	Playoffs
Americas	LTA	FlyQuest	LTA North Split 2 finalists	5th	Group Stage
Americas	LTA	Cloud9 KIA	LTA North Split 2 finalists	DNQ (Note: As only FlyQuest could qualify for MSI as LTA North champions, Cloud9 were guaranteed entry into the group stage for EWC.)	Group Stage
Americas	LTA	FURIA	LTA South Split 2 champion	10th	Group Stage

== Draw ==
The results of the draw for the group stage were announced on 11 July 2025.

Group A	Group B
Cloud9	CTBC Flying Oyster
FlyQuest	GAM Esports
FURIA	Hanwha Life Esports
G2 Esports	Movistar KOI

== Group stage ==
- Dates: 16–17 July 2025
- Eight teams were drawn into four groups of four teams each. Teams from the same region cannot be placed in the same group.
- Double elimination; all matches are best-of-one
- The eight teams consisting the teams that finished 5th-8th at MSI 2025 and the third-ranked team from the LCK and the second-ranked team from the LTA North.

=== Group A ===
Initial Match
16 July, 15:00 AST
FlyQuest	1
Cloud9	0
16 July, 14:00 AST
G2 Esports	1
Furia Esports	0
Elimination Match
16 July, 19:00 AST
Cloud9	0
Furia Esports	1

Winners Match
16 July, 17:00 AST
G2 Esports	1
FlyQuest	0
Decider Match
17 July, 13:00 AST
Furia Esports	0
FlyQuest	1

Playoffs Qualified
G2 Esports
FlyQuest

=== Group B ===
Initial Match
16 July, 12:00 AST
CTBC Flying Oyster	0
Hanwha Life Esports	1
16 July, 13:00 AST
Movistar KOI	1
GAM Esports	0
Elimination Match
16 July, 18:00 AST
CTBC Flying Oyster	1
GAM Esports	0

Winners Match
16 July, 16:00 AST
Hanwha Life Esports	1
Movistar KOI	0
Decider Match
17 July, 12:00 AST
Movistar KOI	1
CTBC Flying Oyster	0

Playoffs Qualified
Hanwha Life Esports
Movistar KOI

== Playoffs ==
- Dates: 17–20 July 2025
- Matchups were determined by a draw
- Eight teams consisting of the top four teams from MSI 2025 and the four teams that qualified from the group stage
- Single elimination; matches in quarterfinals and semifinals are best-of-threes; final is best-of-five

Quarterfinals
18 July, 15:00 AST
Gen.G	2
FlyQuest	0
17 July, 17:00 AST
G2 Esports	2
Bilibili Gaming	1
17 July, 14:00 AST
Hanwha Life Esports	1
AG.AL	2
18 July, 12:00 AST
Movistar KOI	1
T1	2

Semifinals
19 July, 12:00 AST
Gen.G	2
G2 Esports	1
19 July, 15:00 AST
AG.AL	2
T1	0

Final
20 July, 15:00 AST
Gen.G	3
AG.AL	2
Third place
20 July, 11:00 AST
T1	2
G2 Esports	0

== Ranking ==
The tournament had a total prize pool of US$2,000,000, doubled from the 2024 tournament. It was distributed as shown below.

Place	Team	Region	Prize (%)	Prize (USD)
1st	Gen.G	LCK	30%	$600,000
2nd	AG.AL	LPL	16%	$320,000
3rd	T1	LCK	11.5%	$230,000
4th	G2 Esports	LEC	8%	$160,000
5th–8th	Hanwha Life Esports	LCK	5.5%	$110,000
5th–8th	Bilibili Gaming	LPL	5.5%	$110,000
5th–8th	Movistar KOI	LEC	5.5%	$110,000
5th–8th	FlyQuest	LTA	5.5%	$110,000
9th–10th	CTBC Flying Oyster	LCP	3.75%	$75,000
9th–10th	FURIA	LTA	3.75%	$75,000
11th–12th	GAM Esports	LCP	2.5%	$50,000
11th–12th	Cloud9	LTA	2.5%	$50,000
