= LNG Esports =

Chinese esports organization

- Nickname: "Little Qilin" (小麒麟)
- Game: League of Legends
- Founded: 11 September 2013 (as Snake Esports); 21 May 2019 (as LNG Esports)
- League: League of Legends Pro League
- Team history: Snake Esports (2013–2019); LNG Esports (2019–present)
- Based in: Suzhou, China
- Stadium: Yangcheng International Esports Center
- Owner: Li Qilin
- CEO: Shuang Quan
- Manager: Wang "Stan" Miao; Zuo Wujun
- Parent group: Li-Ning
- Motto: "Anything is possible"

Chinese name
- Simplified Chinese: LNG电子竞技俱乐部
- Traditional Chinese: LNG電子競技俱樂部
- Literal meaning: LNG Esports Club
Transcriptions
Standard Mandarin
- Hanyu Pinyin: LNG Diànzǐ Jìngjì Jùlèbù

LNG Esports is a Chinese professional esports organization based in Suzhou. It was known as Snake Esports from its creation in 2013 until its acquisition by sportswear company Li-Ning in 2019.

LNG's main League of Legends team competes in the League of Legends Pro League (LPL), the top-level league for the game in China. LNG plays its home games at the Yangcheng International Esports Center in Suzhou.

== History ==
Snake Esports announced on 21 May 2019 that they had been acquired by athletic apparel company Li-Ning and that they were rebranding as LNG Esports. Top laner Li "Flandre" Xuanjun, jungler Lê "SofM" Quang Duy, mid laner Huang "Fenfen" Chen, bot laner Lu "Asura" Qi and support Hu "Maestro" Jianxin remained on the team following the acquisition. To complete LNG's inaugural roster, mid laner Bae "Plex" Ho-young and support Duan "Duan" De-Liang were acquired from Griffin and Vici Gaming respectively.

LNG placed seventh in the 2019 LPL Summer regular season, qualifying for the first round of playoffs. After sweeping Invictus Gaming in the first round, LNG lost to Royal Never Give Up in the quarterfinals.

In late 2019, LNG announced several roster changes, dropping SofM, Plex, Fenfen, and Maestro, and signing jungler Xiong "Xx" Yulong, rookie support Liao "lwandy" Dingyang, and Taiwanese veteran mid laner Huang "Maple" Yi-tang. Bot laner Wang "Light" Guangyu was also promoted from LNG's academy team. This revamped roster's first tournament was the 2019 Demacia Cup, in which they placed third in their group and failed to qualify for the knockout stage (i.e. playoffs). Aside from promoting top laner Zhou "chenlun17" Pengyuan, LNG did not make any other changes to their starting roster during the 2020 season. LNG placed 16th in the spring split and 13th in the summer split, both times ending with a 5–11 record.

LNG announced on 17 December 2020 that they had made several major changes to their roster. Top laner Chang "M1kuya" Xiao, mid laner Xie "icon" Tianyu, and most notably Korean star jungler Lee "Tarzan" Seung-yong had been acquired from SDX Gaming, OMG, and Griffin respectively. Despite these roster changes, in the 2020 Demacia Cup LNG once again finished third in their group and failed to qualify for the knockout stage. Hu "Ale" Jiale was subsequently acquired from TT Gaming and signed as a substitute top laner for the 2021 season.

LNG placed tenth in the 2021 LPL Spring regular season and qualified for the first round of playoffs, where they were swept by Suning. LNG had a stronger showing in the summer split, placing eight in the regular season and taking upset victories over several higher-placed teams. However, LNG's summer playoff run was ended in the fourth round (i.e. quarterfinals) by Edward Gaming, which would go on to win that split's title. LNG's overall placements in the spring and summer splits earned them a spot in the 2021 LPL Regional Finals, where they defeated Rare Atom and Team WE to qualify for the 2021 World Championship.

== Roster ==
LNG Esports League of Legends roster
Players
Coaches

Role	Handle	Name	Nationality
Top	Zika	Tang Hua-yu	China
Jungle	Weiwei	Wei Bo-han	China
Mid	Scout	Lee Ye-chan	South Korea
Bot	GALA	Chen Wei	China
Support	Hang	Fu Ming-hang	China

Head coach

Luo "Crescent" Cheng

Assistant coach(es)

Zeng "U" Long

Legend:
- (I) Inactive
- (S) Suspended
- Substitute
- (injured) Injury / Illness

Roster updated 23 July 2024.
