= Weibo Gaming =

Chinese esports organization

- Short name: WBG, WBG FAW Audi (League of Legends division)
- Divisions: Arena of Valor; Crossfire; Hearthstone; League of Legends; League of Legends: Wild Rift; Naraka: Bladepoint; PUBG: Battlegrounds; PUBG Mobile; Valorant; Identity V
- Founded: 21 November 2021; 4 years ago
- Partners: Audi; Andaseat; Lenovo Legion; Burger King; Razer Inc.; Gigabyte Technology; Acer Predator
- Parent group: Weibo Corporation

Chinese name
- Simplified Chinese: 微博电子竞技俱乐部
- Traditional Chinese: 微博電子競技俱樂部
- Literal meaning: Weibo Esports Club
Transcriptions
Standard Mandarin
- Hanyu Pinyin: Wēibó Diànzǐ Jìngjì Jùlèbù

Weibo Gaming (Note: Formerly known as: T.Bear Gaming (2015 – March 2016, 10 May – 28 December 2016); SNS Esports (March – 10 May 2016); Suning Gaming (28 December 2016 – 11 December 2018); Suning (11 December 2018 – 21 November 2021)) is a Chinese esports organization owned by the Weibo Corporation.

Its League of Legends team competes in the LPL, the top-level league for the game in China. It was owned by e-commerce company Suning.com for most of its history and was previously known as Suning.

Weibo are also members of the Esports World Cup Foundation Club Support Program, funded by Saudi Arabia's Public Investment Fund, which gives teams monetary rewards for painting the Esports World Cup tournament series in a positive light and driving engagement to the tournament, which is seen to some as a sportswashing tool that Saudi Arabia is using to distract the public from their poor human rights record.

As of September 2026, their Weibo Gaming team in the Esports World Cup has a CC Ranking of number 18, with 33 matches played, 17 wins and 1100 Total CC Points.

== League of Legends ==
=== History ===
The League of Legends team was founded as Suning Gaming on 28 December 2016, following Suning.com's acquisition of the League of Legends team T.Bear Gaming. A roster was formed to compete in the LSPL, China's secondary pro league; it consisted of XiaoAL (now Langx), Avoidless, dian, Fury, and Yoon. Suning placed second in the 2017 LSPL spring regular season and later swept Young Miracles in the spring finals to qualify for the LPL.On June 20, 2017, Suning Corporation filed a trademark application for "SN GAMING" with the Trademark Office of the State Administration for Industry and Commerce, which was rejected. The court ruled that "GAMING" carries connotations of gambling and could have a negative impact on teenagers; therefore, Suning Esports Club could only compete under the name "Suning".On January 8, 2020, Suning eSports Club announced that Kwon Young-jae (ID: Helper), who had previously played for CJ Entus, Samsung and Ever8, had joined the club as an assistant coach for the League of Legends division.On October 31, 2020, Suning Gaming Club won the runner-up title in the 2020 League of Legends World Championship.

On November 22, 2021, WBG Esports Club's League of Legends division officially announced that the former Suning Esports Club (SUNING) has been officially renamed WBG League of Legends Division (WEIBO GAMING, abbreviated as WBG).

=== Roster ===
Weibo Gaming League of Legends roster
Players
Coaches

Role	Handle	Name	Nationality
Top	Zika	Tang Huayu	China
Jungle	Jiejie	Zhao Lijie	China
Mid	Xiaohu	Li Yuanhao	China
Bot	Elk	Zhao Jiahao	China
Support	Erha	Shi Xuye	China

Head coach

Shin "Shine" Dong-wook

Assistant coach(es)

- Zhao "Tselin" Ze-Lin
- Feng "Medusa" Jun-Da
- Kim "KIM" Jung-su

Legend:
- (I) Inactive
- (S) Suspended
- Substitute
- (injured) Injury / Illness

Roster updated 5 December 2025.

=== 2023 season and Worlds runner-up run ===
Following a roster overhaul ahead of the 2023 season—which included the acquisitions of notable veteran players such as mid laner Li "Xiaohu" Yuanhao and support Liu "Crisp" Qingsong—Weibo Gaming experienced a highly volatile domestic circuit. Following an underwhelming spring split, the organization recruited former World Champion coach Yang "Daeny" Dae-in in May 2023 to stabilize the team. Despite finishing sixth in the 2023 LPL Summer Split, Weibo managed a narrow victory over EDward Gaming in the LPL Regional Finals, securing China's fourth and final seed for the 2023 League of Legends World Championship.

At Worlds 2023, Weibo Gaming was widely considered an underdog. They navigated the newly introduced Swiss stage with a 3–2 record, consistently staying alive through elimination matches. In the knockout stage, Weibo upset NRG Esports in the quarterfinals before pulling off a massive 3–2 semifinal victory over fellow LPL representatives and tournament favorites, Bilibili Gaming. Weibo Gaming's Cinderella run culminated in the Grand Finals at the Gocheok Sky Dome in Seoul, where they faced South Korea's T1. Weibo was ultimately swept 0–3, finishing the international tournament as the runners-up.

=== Tournament results ===
Placement	Event	Final result (W–L)
2nd	2017 LSPL Spring Split	17–5
1st	2017 LSPL Spring Playoffs	3–0 (against Young Miracles)
9th–12th	2017 Demacia Cup	1–2 (against I May)
4th	2017 LPL Summer Split (Group B)	7–9
7th–8th	2017 LPL Summer Playoffs	1–3 (against Invictus Gaming)
7th–8th	2017 Demacia Championship	1–2 (against Rogue Warriors)
5th	2018 LPL Spring Split (East)	9–10
4th	2018 LPL Summer Split (East)	10–9
7th–8th	2018 LPL Summer Playoffs	2–3 (against Topsports Gaming)
4th	NEST 2018	0–2 (against Rogue Warriors)
3rd	2018 Winter Demacia Cup	1–2 (against Invictus Gaming)
6th–7th	NESO 2018	3–5
10th	2019 LPL Spring Split	6–9
5th–8th	NEST 2019	0–2 (against SinoDragon Gaming)
8th	2019 LPL Summer Split	8–7
7th–8th	2019 LPL Summer Playoffs	1–3 (against Edward Gaming)
13th–16th	2019 Demacia Cup	1–3
11th	2020 LPL Spring Split	7–9
4th	2020 LPL Summer Split	12–4
3rd	2020 LPL Summer Playoffs	3–0 (against LGD Gaming)
1st	2020 LPL Regional Finals	3–0 (against LGD Gaming)
2nd	2020 World Championship	1–3 (against DAMWON Gaming)
2nd	2023 World Championship	0–3 (against T1)
