= All Gamers =

Chinese esports organization

- Full name: All Gamers Esports Club
- Short name: AG
- Divisions: As All Gamers; Call of Duty Mobile; CrossFire; Fatal Fury: City of the Wolves; Honor of Kings; Mobile Legends: Bang Bang; Overwatch; Peacekeeper Elite; QQ Speed; Rainbow Six Siege; Street Fighter 6 Teamfight Tactics; Tekken 8 Valorant; As All Gamers Global; Apex Legends; Call of Duty: Warzone; Fortnite; Trackmania; Rocket League; As Anyone's Legend; League of Legends; PUBG: Battlegrounds; Overwatch
- Founded: 1999 (as =A.G=); 2011 (as All Gamers)
- League: League of Legends Pro League (LPL); King Pro League (KPL); CrossFire Pro League (CFPL); Peacekeeper Elite League (PEL); Call of Duty Mobile Major (CDM); R6 CN League; Valorant Champions Tour China (VCT CN)
- Based in: Chengdu, China
- Stadium: All Gamers Esports Center (KPL team)
- Colors: Red
- Partners: SteelSeries; DXRacer; Huya Live; Bilibili; China Telecom

All Gamers (AG) is a Chinese esports organization based in Chengdu. Its origins date to the =A.G= team founded in 1999 by Hu Haibin, Jeeps, Han Yuliang, Yi Ran and Ma Tianyuan. The organization became a professional esports club in 2009, while its modern iteration was formed in 2011 through the merger of the VA esports club and the CrossFire team FC. In 2025, it consolidated its teams competing in international events under the AG.AL brand, competing under this name in the Esports World Cup

All Gamers has fielded teams in a range of PC, console and mobile esports, including League of Legends, Honor of Kings, CrossFire, QQ Speed, Peacekeeper Elite, Tekken 8, Trackmania, Free Fire, Arena of Valor, Teamfight Tactics and Rocket League.

== History ==
The organization's origins date to the creation of the =A.G= team in 1999. Hu Haibin, then a vice president of the Chinese gaming platform AsiaGame, formed the StarCraft team with players Jeeps, Han Yuliang, Yi Ran and Ma Tianyuan. In 2001, team members Ma Tianyuan and Wei Qidi won the StarCraft doubles competition at the World Cyber Games.

The original team then disbanded. In 2009, Ma Tianyuan and Sun Liwei established the VA esports club in Wuhan, while Jiang Yafei, known as Feifei, formed the Crossfire team FC. In 2011, VA and FC merged, re-establishing AG as a professional esports organization.

AG initially focused primarily on first-person shooter games, particularly CrossFire. It also fielded a League of Legends team between 2011 and 2013, but later withdrew from the game due to increasing costs.

In 2016, AG established a mobile esports division, AG Super Play, as an acquisition of the Honor of Kings club Super Play.Longzhu. They would later enter Crossfire Mobile. The division finished runner-up in the inaugural King Pro League season later that year. AG Super Play Honor of Kings have won 4 KPL titles and claimed three world championships, those being the 2019 Honor of Kings International Championship and the 2024 and 2025 King Pro League Grand Finals, as well as the 2024 Challenger Cup and 2025 Honor of Kings World Cup (as AG.AL).

In December 2021, AG returned to League of Legends by acquiring Rogue Warriors's division in League of Legends Pro League, which was subsequently renamed Anyone's Legend.

In 2024, the organization established AG Global to manage its international operations and expansion.

At the 2024 Esports World Cup, the organization finished 17th in the Club Championship. Due to the Esports World Cup Club Championship requiring organisations to compete as a single brand in order to be eligible, All Gamers consolidated its teams for EWC under the AG.AL name in 2025. Under AG.AL, they improved to sixth place in the Club Championship, with its teams winning two events and finishing runner-up in another.

AG.AL won the Esports World Cup Club Championship in 2026, finishing first with 5,300 points and becoming the first Chinese organization to win the competition's Club Championship. AG.AL entered 18 events and won individual titles in Tekken 8 via Khawaja Muhammad "M. Zubair" Zubair and Trackmania via Gwendal "Gwen" Duparc. AG.AL also had runner-up finishes in Free Fire, Honor of Kings (Note: Honor of Kings at the 2026 Esports World Cup was known as the Honor of Kings World Cup 2026 and featured teams from Arena of Valor.) and chess, and placed third in Teamfight Tactics.

== Divisions ==
All Gamers is particularly associated with CrossFire, where the organization has won the CrossFire Pro League more than ten times and won the CrossFire Stars World Championship in 2021. Its League of Legends division competes under the name Anyone's Legend, while All Gamers itself competes as a partner team in the China league of the Valorant Champions Tour.
