= Top Esports =

Chinese esports organization

- Short name: TES
- Games: League of Legends; PlayerUnknown's Battlegrounds
- Founded: 21 December 2017; 8 years ago
- League: League of Legends Pro League
- Team history: Topsports Gaming (2017–2019); Top Esports (2019–present)
- Location: China
- CEO: Guo Hao
- Championships: 1× LPL (Summer 2020)
- Parent group: Topsports

Chinese name
- Simplified Chinese: 滔搏电子竞技俱乐部
- Traditional Chinese: 滔搏電子競技俱樂部
- Literal meaning: Taobo Esports Club
Transcriptions
Standard Mandarin
- Hanyu Pinyin: Tāobó Diànzǐ Jìngjì Jùlèbù

Top Esports, previously known as Topsports Gaming, is a Chinese esports organization. Its League of Legends team competes in the League of Legends Pro League (LPL), the top-level league for the game in China. It was founded on 21 December 2017 by athletic apparel company Topsports.

== History ==
The Topsports Gaming brand was unveiled on 21 December 2017 by athletic apparel company Topsports, which had acquired the LPL spot of DAN Gaming. The team's first tournament was the 2017 Demacia Championship, where they placed ninth to fifteenth after losing in the third round to Suning Gaming.

Topsports was a member of the LPL's eastern conference during the 2018 spring season, placing seventh with a 3–16 record. For the 2018 summer season, Topsports was moved to the western conference where they placed third with a 10–9 record, qualifying for playoffs. The team lost in the first round to Royal Never Give Up. Topsports was one of eight teams that participated in the 2018 National Electronic Sports Tournament (NEST 2018), placing second after losing to JD Gaming in the finals. This result qualified Topsports for the 2018 Demacia Cup winter season, where they placed second again after losing to Invictus Gaming in the finals.

During the offseason before the 2019 LPL Spring Split Topsports changed up their main roster, which became top laner Bai "369" Jiahao, jungler Xiong "Xx" Yulong, mid laner Zhuo "Knight" Ding, bot laner Lee "LokeN" Dong-wook, and support Nam "Ben" Dong-hyun. The team finished third in the regular season with an 11–4 record and 4th in playoffs after losing to Invictus Gaming in the semifinals and FunPlus Phoenix in the third place match. At NEST 2019, Topsports fielded their trainee roster and placed fifth to eighth after losing to Edward Gaming in the quarterfinals.

On 15 May 2019, it was announced that Topsports Gaming had renamed to Top Esports. Top Esports placed second in the regular season of the 2019 LPL Summer Split and third in playoffs after winning the third-place match against Bilibili Gaming. The team was unable to qualify for the 2019 World Championship after narrowly losing to Invictus Gaming in the last round of the regional finals. Xx left the team on 15 December 2019 and was replaced by LMS veteran Hung "Karsa" Hao-hsuan. Ben and LokeN followed suit shortly after, and were replaced with Zhang "QiuQiu" Ming and Liang "yuyanjia" Jiayuan, and Ying "Photic" Qishen respectively. Top Esports lost to Vici Gaming in the 2019 Demacia Cup semifinals and placed fifth to eighth.

During the 2020 LPL Spring Split regular season, Top Esports experimented between QiuQiu and yuyanjia in the support role and originally intended to start former Invictus Gaming player and world champion Yu "JackeyLove" Wenbo as their bot laner. However, due to the length of JackeyLove's contract, he was unable to play until near the end of the regular season, with Photic maintaining his role as Top Esports' starting bot laner until then. Nonetheless, Top Esports finished fourth in the regular season with an 11–5 record. After defeating Team WE and Invictus Gaming in the quarterfinals and semifinals respectively, Top Esports made it to their first LPL finals. After a close series, Top Esports lost to JD Gaming and finished runners-up.

Due to the global COVID-19 pandemic, the annual Mid-Season Invitational was cancelled for 2020 and replaced by the Mid-Season Streamathon, an online live stream event featuring several tournaments and show matches. One of the online tournaments held was the Mid-Season Cup, featuring the top four teams from the LPL and LCK. Top Esports was drafted into Group A along with FunPlus Phoenix, DAMWON Gaming, and T1. The team finished second in their group, advancing to the knockout stage. In the semifinals, Top Esports swept Gen.G, moving on to the finals where they defeated FunPlus Phoenix to claim the Mid-Season Cup.

Top Esports did not make any roster changes going into the 2020 LPL Summer Split, although they did experiment with QiuQiu in the bot lane. The team finished first in the regular season and received a bye to the semifinals, where they swept Suning. After another close series against JD Gaming in the finals, Top Esports managed to defeat their longtime rivals, claiming their first LPL title and qualifying for the 2020 World Championship as the LPL's first seed.

For the main event group stage of the 2020 World Championship, Top Esports was drafted into Group D along with South Korean team DRX, North American team FlyQuest, and Russian team Unicorns of Love.

== Current roster ==
Top Esports League of Legends roster
Players
Coaches

Role	Handle	Name	Nationality
Top	ZUIAN	Cheng Zi-Hao	China
Jungle	Tian	Gao Tian-Liang	China
Mid	Creme	Lin Jian	China
Bot	JackeyLove	Yu Wenbo	China
Support	Zhuo	Wang Xu-Zhuo	China

Head coach

Chang "Poppy" Po-Hao

Assistant coach(es)

He "BoBo" Wen-Bo
Li "Leo" Yu-Ming

Legend:
- (I) Inactive
- (S) Suspended
- Substitute
- (injured) Injury / Illness

Roster updated 18 August 2026.

== Tournament results ==
Placement	Event	Final result (W–L)
9th–15th	2017 Demacia Championship	1–2 (against Suning Gaming)
7th	2018 LPL Spring Split (East)	3–16
1st	2018 Xinhua E-Sports Conference	3–1 (against ThunderoBot Gaming)
3rd	2018 LPL Summer Split (West)	10–9
6th	2018 LPL Summer Playoffs	1–3 (against Royal Never Give Up)
2nd	NEST 2018	1–2 (against JD Gaming)
2nd	2018 Demacia Cup	1–3 (against Invictus Gaming)
3rd	2019 LPL Spring Split	11–4
4th	2019 LPL Spring Playoffs	1–3 (against FunPlus Phoenix)
5th–8th	NEST 2019	1–2 (against Edward Gaming)
2nd	Rift Rivals 2019 LCK-LPL-LMS-VCS	1–3 (against LCK)
2nd	2019 LPL Summer Split	12–3
3rd	2019 LPL Summer Playoffs	3–0 (against Bilibili Gaming)
2nd	2019 LPL Regional Finals	2–3 (against Invictus Gaming)
5th–8th	2019 Demacia Cup	2–3 (against Vici Gaming)
3rd	2020 LPL Scrims League	2–2
4th	2020 LPL Spring Split	11–5
2nd	2020 LPL Spring Playoffs	2–3 (against JD Gaming)
1st	2020 Mid-Season Cup	3–1 (against FunPlus Phoenix)
1st	2020 LPL Summer Split	13–3
1st	2020 LPL Summer Playoffs	3–2 (against JD Gaming)
1st	2020 Demacia Cup	3–0 (against Team WE)
3rd	2021 LPL Spring Split	12–4
3rd	2021 LPL Spring Playoffs	2–3 (against Royal Never Give Up)
5th	2021 LPL Summer Split	10–6
5th-8th	2021 LPL Summer Playoffs	1–3 (against LNG Esports)
1st	2021 Demacia Cup	3–2 (against FunPlus Phoenix)
5th	2022 LPL Spring Split	11–5
2nd	2022 LPL Spring Playoffs	2–3 (against Royal Never Give Up)
1st	2022 LPL Summer Split	14–2
2nd	2022 LPL Summer Playoffs	2–3 (against JD Gaming)
9th–11th	2022 World Championship	3–3
