= League of Legends Pro League =

Professional League of Legends league in China

- Current season, competition or edition: 2026 LPL season
- Game: League of Legends
- Founded: 2013
- Owner: Tencent
- Motto: "Crazy is our game" (无畏竞巅峰)
- No. of teams: 16
- Country: China
- Venues: Shanghai (for most teams); Beijing (for JD Gaming); Shenzhen (for Ninjas in Pyjamas); Suzhou (for LNG Esports); Xi'an (for Team WE)
- Most recent champion: Anyone's Legend (2nd title) (2026)
- Most titles: Edward Gaming (6 titles)
- Sponsors: Mercedes Benz, Li-Ning, Momchilovtsi, JingDong, War Horse Energy Drink, Wahaha Soda Drink, Lenovo, Intel, TT Yuyin, TGIF, Oppo, Mobil Oil, TCL, Tongcheng, Sānjīn xīguā shuāng, Durex
- Domestic cup: Demacia Cup
- International cups: World Championship; Mid Season Invitational; First Stand Tournament
- Related competitions: CBLOL, LCK, LCP, LCS, LEC (Tier 1); League of Legends Development League (2nd Division)
- Website: lpl.qq.com (Chinese)

League of Legends Pro League
- Simplified Chinese: 英雄联盟职业联赛
- Traditional Chinese: 英雄聯盟職業聯賽
Transcriptions
Standard Mandarin
- Hanyu Pinyin: Yīngxióng Liánméng zhíyè liánsài

The League of Legends Pro League (LPL) is the top-level professional league for League of Legends in China. The first season of the LPL was the 2013 Spring season. The top three finishers of the playoff tournament receive automatic bids to the League of Legends World Championship. Playoffs are an eight team single elimination with each step a best-of-five series. The total prize pool is ¥2,350,000. In 2014 Riot Games began providing an English language broadcast. The format is modeled after the League of Legends Champions Korea format in South Korea. In September 2015 it was announced that Riot Games was in negotiations with Tencent to take over operations of the league. In 2019, Riot Games and Tencent created joint venture, TJ Sports, to focus on all League of Legends esports business in China, including tournament organizing, talent management, and venues.

With the exception of some touring events, LPL games are played in five venues in Shanghai, Suzhou, Shenzhen, Xi'an, and Beijing.

== Format ==
For the 2015 spring season the LPL adopted a best-of-two series. Teams compete in a double round robin.

From 2017 to 2018, the league used the same format as the EU LCS for selecting regular season groups. The highest ranked teams from the previous split headed the groups with other teams being selected. Matches were also best-of-three.

The LPL has used the following format from 2019 to 2021:

- Regular season:
  - All 16 teams compete in one group
  - Single round robin, all matches are best-of-three
- Top eight teams advance to playoffs
  - All matches are best-of-five
    - First and second place teams from the regular season begin in the semifinals (round 3)
    - Third and fourth place teams from the regular season begin in the quarterfinals (round 2)
    - Fifth to eighth place teams from the regular season begin in the round 1.

The LPL has used the following format from 2021:

- Regular season:
  - All 17 teams compete in one group
  - Single round robin, all matches are best-of-three
- Top ten teams advance to playoffs
  - All matches are best-of-five
  - Teams entering Game 7 and 8 have a second chance before being eliminated.
    - Ninth place team competes Eighth team from the regular season in Game 1.
    - Tenth place team competes Seventh team from the regular season in Game 2.
    - Winner of Game 1 competes with Fifth place team in Game 3.
    - Winner of Game 2 competes with Sixth place team in Game 4.
    - Winner of Game 3 competes with Fourth place team in Game 5.
    - Winner of Game 4 competes with Third place team in Game 6.
    - Winner of Game 5 competes with First place team in Game 7.
    - Winner of Game 6 competes with Second place team in Game 8.
    - Losers of Game 7 and Game 8 competes in Game 9.
    - Winners of Game 7 and Game 8 competes in Game 10.
    - Loser of Game 10 and Winner of Game 9 competes in Game 11.
    - Winners of Game 10 and Game 11 competes in Game 12 and decides the champion.

The finalists of the spring split represents China at the Mid-Season Invitational. The winner of the summer split (seed 1), the team with the most championship points (seed 2), and the winner and runners-up of the regional qualifier (seeds 3 & 4) qualify for the World Championship.

From 2025 onwards, instead of having two split per year, LPL reformed the season into three splits. The winner of Split 1 qualifies to First Stand 2025 while the winner and runner up qualifies to MSI 2025. For Worlds qualifications, they are determined as follows:

- The champion of Split 3 will automatically qualify for World Championship 2025 Main Event as the first seed.
- The team (other than the Split 3 champion) that has accrued the most championship points throughout the 2025 Season will qualify for World Championship 2025 Main Event as the second seed.
- The third seed, determined at the Regional Finals, will also qualify for World Championship 2025 Main Event.
- If needed, the fourth seed, determined at the Regional Finals, will qualify for World Championship 2025 Play-ins.
- If teams are tied by championship points, teams will be ranked based on Split 3 rankings.

== Teams ==
The following fifteen organizations compete in the league:

- Anyone's Legend
- Bilibili Gaming
- EDward Gaming
- Invictus Gaming
- JD Gaming
- LGD Gaming
- LNG Esports
- Ninjas in Pyjamas
- Oh My God
- Royal Never Give Up
- Team WE
- TT Gaming
- Top Esports
- Ultra Prime
- Weibo Gaming

== Results ==
† Background shading indicates that the team won the World championship.

Year	Split	1st	2nd	3rd	4th	Qualified for the World Championship			
Year	Split	1st	2nd	3rd	4th	Seed 1	Seed 2	Seed 3	Seed 4
2013	Spring	Oh My God	Positive Energy	Invictus Gaming	Team WE	Royal Club	OMG	—N/a	—N/a
2013	Summer	Positive Energy	Oh My God	Team WE	Royal Club	Royal Club	OMG	—N/a	—N/a
2014	Spring	EDward Gaming	Invictus Gaming	Oh My God	Team WE	EDward Gaming	Star Horn Royal Club	OMG	—N/a
2014	Summer	EDward Gaming	Oh My God	Star Horn Royal Club	LGD Gaming	EDward Gaming	Star Horn Royal Club	OMG	—N/a
2015	Spring	EDward Gaming	LGD Gaming	Invictus Gaming	Snake Esports	LGD Gaming	EDward Gaming	Invictus Gaming	—N/a
2015	Summer	LGD Gaming	Qiao Gu Reapers	Invictus Gaming	EDward Gaming	LGD Gaming	EDward Gaming	Invictus Gaming	—N/a
2016	Spring	Royal Never Give Up	EDward Gaming	Team WE	Qiao Gu Reapers	EDward Gaming	Royal Never Give Up	I May	—N/a
2016	Summer	EDward Gaming	Royal Never Give Up	I May	Team WE	EDward Gaming	Royal Never Give Up	I May	—N/a
2017	Spring	Team WE	Royal Never Give Up	EDward Gaming	Oh My God	EDward Gaming	Royal Never Give Up	Team WE	—N/a
2017	Summer	EDward Gaming	Royal Never Give Up	Invictus Gaming	Team WE	EDward Gaming	Royal Never Give Up	Team WE	—N/a
2018	Spring	Royal Never Give Up	EDward Gaming	Rogue Warriors	Invictus Gaming	Royal Never Give Up	Invictus Gaming †	EDward Gaming	—N/a
2018	Summer	Royal Never Give Up	Invictus Gaming	JD Gaming	Rogue Warriors	Royal Never Give Up	Invictus Gaming †	EDward Gaming	—N/a
2019	Spring	Invictus Gaming	JD Gaming	FunPlus Phoenix	Topsports Gaming	FunPlus Phoenix †	Royal Never Give Up	Invictus Gaming	—N/a
2019	Summer	FunPlus Phoenix	Royal Never Give Up	Top Esports	Bilibili Gaming	FunPlus Phoenix †	Royal Never Give Up	Invictus Gaming	—N/a
2020	Spring	JD Gaming	Top Esports	FunPlus Phoenix	Invictus Gaming	Top Esports	JD Gaming	Suning	LGD Gaming
2020	Summer	Top Esports	JD Gaming	Suning	LGD Gaming	Top Esports	JD Gaming	Suning	LGD Gaming
2021	Spring	Royal Never Give Up	FunPlus Phoenix	Edward Gaming	Top Esports	Edward Gaming †	FunPlus Phoenix	Royal Never Give Up	LNG Esports
2021	Summer	Edward Gaming	FunPlus Phoenix	Team WE	LNG Esports	Edward Gaming †	FunPlus Phoenix	Royal Never Give Up	LNG Esports
2022	Spring	Royal Never Give Up	Top Esports	Victory Five	JD Gaming	JD Gaming	Top Esports	Edward Gaming	Royal Never Give Up
2022	Summer	JD Gaming	Top Esports	Edward Gaming	LNG Esports	JD Gaming	Top Esports	Edward Gaming	Royal Never Give Up
2023	Spring	JD Gaming	Bilibili Gaming	Edward Gaming	Oh My God	JD Gaming	Bilibili Gaming	LNG Esports	Weibo Gaming
2023	Summer	JD Gaming	LNG Esports	Bilibili Gaming	Top Esports	JD Gaming	Bilibili Gaming	LNG Esports	Weibo Gaming
2024	Spring	Bilibili Gaming	Top Esports	JD Gaming	Ninjas in Pyjamas	Bilibili Gaming	Top Esports	LNG Esports	Weibo Gaming
2024	Summer	Bilibili Gaming	Weibo Gaming	Top Esports	LNG Esports	Bilibili Gaming	Top Esports	LNG Esports	Weibo Gaming
2025	Split 1	Top Esports	Anyone's Legend	JD Gaming	Bilibili Gaming	Bilibili Gaming	Anyone's Legend	Top Esports	Invictus Gaming
2025	Split 2	Anyone's Legend	Bilibili Gaming	Invictus Gaming	Team WE	Bilibili Gaming	Anyone's Legend	Top Esports	Invictus Gaming
2025	Split 3	Bilibili Gaming	Top Esports	Anyone's Legend	JD Gaming	Bilibili Gaming	Anyone's Legend	Top Esports	Invictus Gaming
2026	Split 1	Bilibili Gaming	JD Gaming	Weibo Gaming	Anyone's Legend	Anyone's Legend	Bilibili Gaming	Top Esports	Invictus Gaming
2026	Split 2	Bilibili Gaming	Top Esports	Team WE	Anyone's Legend	Anyone's Legend	Bilibili Gaming	Top Esports	Invictus Gaming
2026	Split 3	Anyone's Legend	Bilibili Gaming	Invictus Gaming	LGD Gaming	Anyone's Legend	Bilibili Gaming	Top Esports	Invictus Gaming

=== By team ===
Teams in italics indicate teams that have been disbanded or no longer participates in the league.

Team	Title(s)	Runners-up	Seasons won	Seasons runner-up
Edward Gaming	6	2	2014 Spring, 2014 Summer, 2015 Spring, 2016 Summer, 2017 Summer, 2021 Summer	2016 Spring, 2018 Spring
Royal Never Give Up	5	4	2016 Spring, 2018 Spring, 2018 Summer, 2021 Spring, 2022 Spring	2016 Summer, 2017 Spring, 2017 Summer, 2019 Summer
Bilibili Gaming	5	3	2024 Spring, 2024 Summer, 2025 Split 3, 2026 Split 1, 2026 Split 2	2023 Spring, 2025 Split 2, 2026 Split 3
JD Gaming	4	2	2020 Spring, 2022 Summer, 2023 Spring, 2023 Summer	2019 Spring, 2020 Summer
Top Esports	2	5	2020 Summer, 2025 Split 1	2020 Spring, 2022 Spring, 2022 Summer, 2024 Spring, 2026 Split 2
Anyone's Legend	2	1	2025 Split 2, 2026 Split 3	2025 Split 1
Invictus Gaming	1	2	2019 Spring	2014 Spring, 2018 Summer
FunPlus Phoenix	1	2	2019 Summer	2021 Spring, 2021 Summer
Oh My God	1	2	2013 Spring	2013 Summer, 2014 Summer
LGD Gaming	1	1	2015 Summer	2015 Spring
Positive Energy	1	1	2013 Summer	2013 Spring
Team WE	1	0	2017 Spring	
LNG Esports	0	1		2023 Summer
Newbee (Note: Previously known as Qiao Gu Reapers until May 2016, ultimately the team disbanded in December 2017.)	0	1		2015 Summer
