= Anyone's Legend =

Chinese League of Legends team

- Short name: AL
- Game: League of Legends; Overwatch; PUBG: Battlegrounds
- Founded: 1 December 2021; 4 years ago
- League: League of Legends Pro League (LPL); Overwatch Champions Series EMEA (OWCS); PUBG Vietnam Series (PVS)
- Based in: Chengdu, China
- Championships: 2× LPL; 1× PVS
- Motto: 不忘初心，荣耀彼此 (transl. "Do not lose sight of your goal. Bring honour to each other.")

Chinese name
- Simplified Chinese: AL英雄联盟
- Traditional Chinese: AL英雄聯盟
- Literal meaning: AL League of Legends
Transcriptions
Standard Mandarin
- Hanyu Pinyin: AL Yīngxióng Liánméng

Anyone's Legend (AL) is the name of multiple teams belonging to the Chinese esports organisation All Gamers, most notably its League of Legends division. AL's main League of Legends team was founded in 2021 and competes in the League of Legends Pro League (LPL), the top-level professional league for the game in China. AL won its first LPL title in the second split of 2025, which qualified the team for the 2025 Mid-Season Invitational. The team won its second title in the grand finals (third split finals) of 2026, qualifying for the 2026 World Championship as the LPL's first seed.

== History ==
The Chengdu-based esports organisation All Gamers (AG) announced on 1 December 2021 that it had acquired the League of Legends Pro League (LPL) spot of Rogue Warriors and established a new team named Anyone's Legend (AL). AL did not qualify for playoffs until the 2024 summer split, where they were knocked out in the third round.

Hoping to revamp its roster for the 2025 season, the team signed two LPL veterans: 2021 World Champion Flandre and 2024 World semifinalist Tarzan. AL placed first in their group in the group stage of the first split, but were defeated 3–1 by Top Esports in their inaugural finals appearance. In the subsequent group stage of the second split, they placed second in their group behind Top Esports. AL would then go undefeated through the entire upper bracket of playoffs to make it to the finals, where they defeated Bilibili Gaming (BLG) 3–1 to claim their first LPL title and a spot at their first international tournament, the 2025 Mid-Season Invitational (MSI 2025).

AL began MSI 2025 in the second stage (bracket stage) of the event due to them being the LPL's first seed. The team defeated North America's FlyQuest in the first round before losing to South Korea's Gen.G in the second. Dropping to the lower bracket, AL first defeated Taiwanese team CTBC Flying Oyster and then BLG once again, before being eliminated by South Korean team T1 in the last lower round before the finals.

AL defeated BLG once again in the 2026 grand finals (third split finals), earning the team the LPL's first seed at the 2026 World Championship.

== Roster ==
Anyone's Legend roster
Players
Coaches

Role	Handle	Name	Nationality
Top	Breathe	Chen Chen	China
Jungle	Tarzan	Lee Seung-yong	South Korea
Mid	Shanks	Cui Xiaojun	China
Bot	Hope	Wang Jie	China
Support	Kael	Kim Jin-hong	South Korea

Head coach

Fu "BigWei" Chien-wei

Assistant coach(es)

- Zhou "Despa1r" Lipeng
- Jiang "Teacherma" Chen

Legend:
- (I) Inactive
- (S) Suspended
- Substitute
- (injured) Injury / Illness

Roster updated 28 July 2026.

== Season-by-season records ==
Year		League of Legends Pro League						First Stand	Mid-Season Invitational	World Championship
Year		P	W	L	W–L	Pos.	Playoffs	First Stand	Mid-Season Invitational	World Championship
2022	Spring	40	14	26	.350	13th	Did not qualify	–	Did not qualify	Did not qualify
2022	Summer	37	16	21	.432	11th	Did not qualify	–	Did not qualify	Did not qualify
2023	Spring	41	13	28	.317	16th	Did not qualify	–	Did not qualify	Did not qualify
2023	Summer	39	12	27	.308	16th	Did not qualify	–	Did not qualify	Did not qualify
2024	Spring	41	18	23	.439	11th	Did not qualify	–	Did not qualify	Did not qualify
2024	Summer	19	9	10	.474	6th	Round 3	–	Did not qualify	Did not qualify
2025	Split 1	11	9	2	.818	1st	Runners-up	Did not qualify	Lower final	Quarterfinals
2025	Split 2	42	28	14	.667	2nd	Champions	Did not qualify	Lower final	Quarterfinals
2025	Split 3	34	19	15	.559	4th	Round 4 (LB)	Did not qualify	Lower final	Quarterfinals
2026	Split 1	27	18	9	.667	1st	Round 3	Did not qualify	Did not qualify	Swiss stage
2026	Split 2	31	17	14	.548	4th	Round 3	Did not qualify	Did not qualify	Swiss stage
2026	Split 3	36	22	14	.611	2nd	Champions	Did not qualify	Did not qualify	Swiss stage
