= OMG (esports) =

Chinese esports organization

- Full name: Oh My God
- Sport: League of Legends
- Founded: 9 May 2012; 14 years ago
- League: League of Legends Pro League
- Based in: Shanghai
- Colors: Black and white
- Manager: Huang "Tsukasa" Ying-Xiang
- Partners: Douyu TV

OMG (short for Oh My God) is a Chinese esports organization. Their League of Legends division was formed in May 2012 and competes in the League of Legends Pro League (LPL). The team made its first appearance at the League of Legends World Championship in 2013 and qualified again the following year.

== History ==
In May 2012, the Chinese eSports organization OMG picked up their first League of Legends team. That roster was short lived as the organization picking up Noah's Ark in August. One of their first major tournaments they attended was CPL Shenyang 2012. Able to conquer the Korean team of MVP White, they went on to lose against veteran Chinese powerhouse, Invictus Gaming 2–1, and followed up by facing MVP White again but losing the rematch, placing 3rd in the tournament. The following months led to strong showings at various small events and tournaments. A big opportunity to showcase their talents was when they would replace Azubu Frost in G-League 2012 Season 2. They were able to make it out of groups with a 1–2 record but lose first round of bracket stage to Team WE.i-Rocks placing 5th.

It was in pre-Season 3 into Season 3 that OMG gained headway with their name, becoming a feared opponent in Asia. They would qualify to play in NVIDIA Game Festival 2013 facing off against a few of the best Asian teams. They would lose against Season 2 World Championship participants World Elite and the Season 2 Champions Taipei Assassins, ending up 4th but proved to be a good experience for the players. Next OMG would qualify for one of the best competitive Chinese leagues, 2013 LPL Spring. Throughout the season, the team would tear through China's best, ending with a record of 21-7 and being 2nd going into playoffs. OMG overcame both World Elite and Positive Energy to become the LPL Spring Champions and prove their place as a world class team.

OMG would go on to win the major StarsWar 8 tournament, place 3rd at IEM Season VIII - Global Challenge Shanghai and dominate again in 2013 LPL Summer, ending in 1st place with a record of 17–4. Gaining much traction throughout Season 3, OMG became a favorite to possibly be a Chinese representative at the Season 3 World Championship in Los Angeles. At the Season 3 China Regional Finals in September 2013, OMG would face off versus three other of the country's top teams for a spot at the championship. After beating Invictus 2–0, OMG was able to be victorious over Royal Club Huang Zu, advancing them to the grand final but more importantly, winning the seed for Worlds. They would lose to Royal Club in the finals 3-1 and although missing the chance to gain the huge advantage of being placed directly into the quarterfinals, it still meant they would be present in the US to fight against the world's best.

At the S3 Championship, OMG would prove to be a powerhouse in their groups, taking the teams by storm with their early game aggression. They would only lose one game to SK Telecom T1 K and advance to the quarterfinals where they would face familiar foe, Royal Club Huang Zu. The match would be the most anticipated game in the quarterfinals and did not disappoint. The set proved to be explosive, with both sides playing very aggressively. OMG would being conquered by their Regional Finals rivals, losing 0–2. They would be eliminated from the tournament, finishing 5th.

OMG finished 1st in the 2014 LPL Spring Regular Season and then finished 3rd in the playoffs after losing to iG. Struggling in the Season 4 Worlds Group stage, they tremendously upset favored Korean team Najin in the Quarterfinals with news support. In the 2014 League of Legends World Championship, OMG beat Fnatic although there was allegedly a glitch that affect the outcome of the match. The team fell in a close 3–2 series to fellow Chinese rivals Royal Club.

Jian "Uzi" Zihao joined the team from Star Horn Royal Club in December 2014.

OMG finished 7th in the 2015 LPL Spring season and then 5th-8th in the playoffs. On 11 September, Gogoing, LoveLing and Cloud retired from professional play.

Late 2016, OMG forms his Overwatch's division, later, they acquired some members of DS Gaming, the team has mostly participated at OWPS (Overwatch Premier Series) tournament, they finished 4th for the OWPS Spring and 11th for the OWPS Summer. They have acceded to the OWPS Grands Finals, unfortunately, they finished 8th, after the finals ended, OMG's Overwatch division has disbanded.

In 2018, the OMG PUBG (PlayerUnknown's Battlegrounds) team finished 1st in the FPP (First-person perspective) portion of the PUBG Global Invitational tournament.

== Roster (2025) ==
Nat.	ID	Name	Role
(China)	Heri	Wang He-Yong (王赫永)	Top Laner
(China)	Heng	Yang Cui-Heng (杨翠衡)	Jungler
(China)	Linfeng	Qin Jia-Hao (秦嘉豪)	Mid Laner
(China)	Starry	Lei Ming (雷明)	Bot Laner
(South Korea)	Moham	Jeong Jae-hun (정재훈)	Support

== Tournament results ==
=== League of Legends ===
- 5th — Season 3 World Championship
- 3rd — 2014 League of Legends World Championship
- 7th — 2015 Spring LPL season
- 5th-8th — 2015 Spring LPL playoffs

=== Overwatch ===
- 4th — Overwatch Premier Series 2017 - Spring
- 11th — Overwatch Premier Series 2017 - Summer
- 5th-8th — Overwatch Premier Series 2017 - Grands Finals

=== PUBG ===
- 1st — PUBG Global Invitational 2018
