= TT Esports =

Chinese esports organization

- Short name: TT
- Divisions: League of Legends; Honor of Kings; PUBG Mobile; Wild Rift; Valorant Mobile
- Founded: 18 February 2020 (as TTG.XQ); 20 August 2020 (as TTG); 16 September 2020 (as TT)
- League: League of Legends Pro League (LPL); King Pro League (KPL); Peace Elite League (PEL)Wild Rift League (WRL)
- Based in: Guangzhou
- Location: China

TT Esports is a Chinese esports organization with teams competing in League of Legends, Honor of Kings, PUBG Mobile, Wild Rift, and Valorant Mobile. Its League of Legends team competes in the League of Legends Pro League (LPL), is one of the core business divisions of Quwan Group. The CEO is Liu Yifei.

== Honor of Kings ==
Guangzhou TTG (Honor of Kings)
- Nicknames: Sweet Cake (Chinese: 甜甜糕)
- Short name: Guangzhou TTG
- Founded: 18 February 2020
- League: King Pro League (KPL)
- Based in: Guangzhou, People's Republic of China
- Head coach: Hu Zhuanghao (ID: JiuZhe)
- Championships: 2023 KPL Summer Split - Champion; 2025 Asia Champions League - Champion

The team's Honor of Kings division, known as Guangzhou TTG, finished as runner-up in the 2021 KPL Spring Split, Autumn Split, and Challenger Cup. On September 10, 2023, the team defeated Wolves with a score of 4:2 in the 2023 KPL Summer Grand Finals, winning the championship. In addition, TT Esports won the championship at the 2025 Asia Champions League (ACL) and qualified for the 2025 Esports World Cup (EWC), where they ultimately finished as runners-up in the grand finals.

=== Coaching staff (2025 KPL season) ===
ID	Name	Position	Nationality
JiuZhe	Hu Zhuanghao	Head coach	People's Republic of China
Chen Xia	Wang Qing	Assistant coach	People's Republic of China
Zhi Jian	Huang Qinghua	Assistant coach	People's Republic of China
Ying Tian	Li Haotian	Analyst	People's Republic of China
Chord	Li Ruicheng	Project director	People's Republic of China
Fu Xiao	Liu Fusheng	Team leader	People's Republic of China

=== Players Roster ===
ID	Name	Position	Nationality
Qing	Wu Jinxiang	Confront	People's Republic of China
Zizz	Zhang Wenghao	Confront	People's Republic of China
Sunrise	Li Jiaxu	Jungle	People's Republic of China
Sunday	Zou Mingwei	Jungle	People's Republic of China
Crane	Jiang Lijie	Mid lane	People's Republic of China
Snowy	Yue Caiying	Farm lane	People's Republic of China
Joy	Zou Weixin	Support	People's Republic of China

=== Competitive results ===
==== Champions ====
- 2023 KPL Summer Split
- 2025 Asia Champions League

==== Runners-up ====
- 2021 KPL Spring Split
- 2021 KPL Autumn Split
- 2021 Honor of Kings Challenger Cup
- 2025 Esports World Cup (KWC)

==== Top 4 Finishes ====
- 2020 KPL Spring Split
- 2021 KCC World Championship
- 2024 KPL Spring Split

==== Asian Games Achievement ====
In October 2023, Guangzhou TTG player Jiang Tao (in-game ID: A Dou) was selected as a member of China's national team for the Honor of Kings Asian Games version at the 19th Asian Games in Hangzhou. He helped the national team win the first-ever gold medal in the esports category at the Asian Games.

== League of Legends ==
TT's League of Legends division is operated under TT Esports, a core business unit of Quwan Technology. It is one of TT Esports' most prominent divisions and officially joined the League of Legends Pro League (LPL) in September 2020. The team was founded on 25 December 2017 as SinoDragon Gaming (SDG) and was one of two teams (the other being Victory Five) accepted into the LPL as part of the league's 2019 expansion. The team rebranded as Dominus Esports (DMO) on 22 May 2019, and again on 15 September 2020 after its acquisition by Chinese messaging service ThunderTalk.

In 2023, players Yoon Yong-ho (ID: HOYA), Yang Ling (ID: Beichuan), Son Woo-hyeon (ID: Ucal), Tang Huanfeng (ID: huanfeng), and Bi Haotian (ID: yaoyao) made history by qualifying for the LPL Spring Split Playoffs and finishing in the Top 8.

=== Coaching staff (2025 LPL Stage 3) ===
ID	Name	Position	Nationality
AFei	Zhou Zhengyan	Head coach	People's Republic of China
Noname	Zhou Qilin	Assistant coach	People's Republic of China
Vlone	Xiao Chuyu	Project director	People's Republic of China
XiaoLvBu	Lv Yuchen	Analyst	People's Republic of China
Grayson	Xing Hao	Interpreter	People's Republic of China
Bing	Chen Bingnan	Team leader	People's Republic of China

=== Players (as of the 2025 LPL Stage 3) ===
ID	Name	Position	Nationality
HOYA	Yoon Yong-ho	Top	Republic of Korea
Aki	Mao An	Jungle	People's Republic of China
xiaohuangren	Yu Zhimin	Jungle	People's Republic of China
SeTab	Song Kyeong-jin	Mid	Republic of Korea
Yxl	Liu Yuxuan	Mid	People's Republic of China
1xn	Li Xiunan	ADC	People's Republic of China
Feather	Wang Tiancifu	Support	People's Republic of China

=== Competitive results ===
Runner-up at the 2022 Demacia Cup

Top 8 finish in the 2023 LPL Spring Split

== PUBG Mobile ==
On October 19, 2021, the professional PUBG Mobile team TMG Esports Club officially joined TT Esports, an esports club under Quwan Network. From that date onward, TMG Esports Club was officially renamed the "TT PUBG Mobile Division" and continued to compete in the Peace Elite League (PEL).

=== Coaching staff (2025) ===
ID	Name	Position	Nationality
OLDWHITE	Liu Hongze	Head coach	People's Republic of China
Color	Li Yang	Competition director	People's Republic of China
Guo Bao	Zhang Qibing	Project director	People's Republic of China

=== Players (as of the 2025 PEL Summer Split) ===
ID	Name	Position	Nationality
SiTing	Yan Youwang	Entry fragger	People's Republic of China
Xing	Han Xing	Camping	People's Republic of China
King	Lin Yien	Captain	People's Republic of China
AJay	Cao Wenjie	Lurker	People's Republic of China
TianYu	Zhang Tianyu	Entry fragger	People's Republic of China

=== Competitive results ===
- 2021 PEL S3 Week 1 — Weekly champion
- 2021 PEL S3 Week 2 — Weekly champion
- 2021 Peace Elite Super Cup — 4th place
- 2022 PEL Summer Regular Season Week 6 — Weekly champion
- 2022 PEL Summer Spilt Finals — 6th place
- 2023 PEL Summer Spilt Finals — 5th place
- 2023 Peace Elite World Championship PEL Qualifiers — 2nd place
- 2024 PEL Spring Spilt Finals — 3rd place
- 2024 PEL Autumn Spilt Week 2 — Weekly champion
- 2024 PEL Autumn Spilt Week 6 — Weekly champion
- 2025 PEL Spring Spilt Week 1 — Weekly champion
- 2025 PEL Spring Spilt Week 2 — Weekly champion
- 2025 PEL Spring Spilt Finals — Champion

=== Asian Games ===
Li Yang (ID: Color), coach of the TT PUBG Mobile division, led the Chinese national team to win the second-ever gold medal in the esports category at the 19th Asian Games in Hangzhou, competing in the PUBG Mobile Asian Games version.

== League of Legends: Wild Rift ==
In 2021, TT Esports established its League of Legends: Wild Rift division. In the same year, they defeated OMG with a score of 4:0 in the League of Legends: Wild Rift Professional Qualifier — LPL Track, claiming the championship of the LPL track qualifier.

=== Roster (as of the 2025 WRL Super League Stage 2) ===
ID	Name	Position	Nationality
Xin	Cheng Shuo	Top	People's Republic of China
XiaoBai	Wang Junshuai	Jungle	People's Republic of China
niuniu	Liu Yi	Jungle	People's Republic of China
Z	Zhou Tianye	Mid	People's Republic of China
KK	Miao Zixuan	ADC	People's Republic of China
qingshan	Li Cheng	Support	People's Republic of China
Chen	Chen Zhe	Head coach	People's Republic of China

=== Competitive results ===
- 2021 League of Legends: Wild Rift Pro League Qualifier – LPL Track — Champion
- 2021 Wild Rift Horizon Cup (Global Championship) — Runner-up
- 2022 Wild Rift Ionia Cup — Runner-up
- 2023 Wild Rift Ionia Cup — Champion
- 2024 Wild Rift Summer Split — Champion
- 2025 Wild Rift Super League Winter Split — Champion
- 2025 Wild Rift Ionia Cup (Guangzhou) — Champion
- 2025 Wild Rift Super League Stage 1 – Stop 1 — Champion
- 2025 Wild Rift Super League Stage 1 Finals — Runner-up

== Valorant Mobile ==
TT Valorant Mobile Division was officially established on July 1, 2025. Since its formation, the team has already achieved notable results, including winning the Fearless Journey Cup championship and securing second place in the 4399 War Soul Cup.

=== Competitive results ===
- Fearless Journey Cup — Champion
- 4399 War Soul Cup— Runner-up
