= Team WE =

Chinese esports organisation

- Short name: WE
- Divisions: Arena of Valor; League of Legends; PlayerUnknown's Battlegrounds; CrossFire; StarCraft; Warcraft III
- Founded: 21 April 2005; 20 years ago
- Based in: Xi'an, China
- Partners: DouYu; GIGABYTE; HyperX; i-Rocks; Niupu; Zhanqi TV
- Website: www.teamwe.com

Team WE, formerly known as World Elite, is a Chinese esports organisation based in Xi'an. It is one of the oldest esports organisations in China.

== League of Legends ==
=== Roster ===
Team WE League of Legends roster
Players
Coaches

Role	Handle	Name	Nationality
Top	Cube	Dai Yi	China
Jungle	Monki	Wang Meng-Qi	China
Mid	Karis	Kim Hong-Jo	South Korea
Bot	About	Moon Hyeong-seok	South Korea
Support	yaoyao	Bi Hao-Tian	China

Head coach

JinJin

Assistant coach(es)

694

Legend:
- (I) Inactive
- (S) Suspended
- Substitute
- (injured) Injury / Illness

=== Tournament highlights ===
- 2nd – Intel Extreme Masters Season IX – World Championship

== Warcraft III ==
=== Former players ===
ID	Name	Race	Joined
Sky	Li Xiaofeng	Human	2005
Infi	Wang Xuwen	Human	2007
