= List of Asian Games medalists in esports =

This is the complete list of Asian Games medalists in esports in 2022.

== Events ==
=== EA Sports FC Online ===
Games	Gold	Silver	Bronze
2022 Hangzhou	Teedech Songsaisakul (THA)	Phatanasak Varanan (THA)	Kwak Jun-hyouk (KOR)

=== Street Fighter V ===
Games	Gold	Silver	Bronze
2022 Hangzhou	Kim Gwan-woo (KOR)	Hsiang Yu-lin (TPE)	Lin Li-wei (TPE)

=== Arena of Valor ===
Games	Gold	Silver	Bronze
2022 Hangzhou	China (CHN); Sun Linwei; Lin Heng; Chi Xiaoming; Xu Bicheng; Jiang Tao; Luo Siyuan	Malaysia (MAS); Nicholas Ng; Yong Zhan Quan; Lai Chia Chien; Ong Jun Yang; Chong Han Hui; Eng Jun Hao	Thailand (THA); Vatcharanan Thaworn; Chayut Suebka; Kawee Wachiraphas; Anusak Manpdong; Sorawat Boonphrom

=== Dota 2 ===
Games	Gold	Silver	Bronze
2022 Hangzhou	China (CHN); Wang Chunyu; Lu Yao; Yang Shenyi; Zhao Zixing; Yu Yajun; Xiong Jiahan	Mongolia (MGL); Altanginjiin Bilgüün; Otgondavaagiin Sükhbat; Battsoojiin Mönkh-Erdene; Narankhandyn Batbayasgalan; Dashzevegiin Tögstör	Malaysia (MAS); Daniel Chan; Cheng Jin Xiang; Thiay Jun Wen; Ng Wei Poong; Yap Jian Wei; Tue Soon Chuan

=== Dream Three Kingdoms 2 ===
Games	Gold	Silver	Bronze
2022 Hangzhou	China (CHN); Cheng Long; Cheng Hu; Fu Haojie; Yao Xing; Zhou Ke; Guo Runmin	Hong Kong (HKG); Law Hing Lung; Chan Cheuk Kit; Yip Ho Lam; Yuen Pak Lam; Yip Wai Lam	Thailand (THA); Chatchapon Chanthorn; Werit Popan; Pachara Thongeiam; Walunchai Sukarin; Teerapat Supasdetch; Attakit Samattakitwanich

=== League of Legends ===
Games	Gold	Silver	Bronze
2022 Hangzhou	South Korea (KOR); Choi Woo-je; Seo Jin-hyeok; Jung Ji-hun; Park Jae-hyeok; Ryu Min-seok; Lee Sang-hyeok	Chinese Taipei (TPE); Xu Shi-Jie; Hung Hao-hsuan; Chu Jun-lan; Chiu Tzu-chuan; Hu Shuo-chieh; Su Chia-hsiang	China (CHN); Chen Zebin; Zhao Lijie; Zhuo Ding; Zhao Jiahao; Tian Ye; Peng Lixun

=== PUBG Mobile ===
Games	Gold	Silver	Bronze
2022 Hangzhou	China (CHN); Liu Yunyu; Zhu Bocheng; Zhang Jianhui; Chen Yumeng; Huang Can	South Korea (KOR); Choi Young-jae; Kim Dong-hyeon; Kwon Soon-bin; Kim Sung-hyun; Park Sang-cheol	Chinese Taipei (TPE); Chiang Chien-ting; Wang Bo-zhi; Tsai Cheng-fu; Wang Chin-hung; Chen Hung-ming
