= Keria (gamer) =

South Korean League of Legends pro gamer

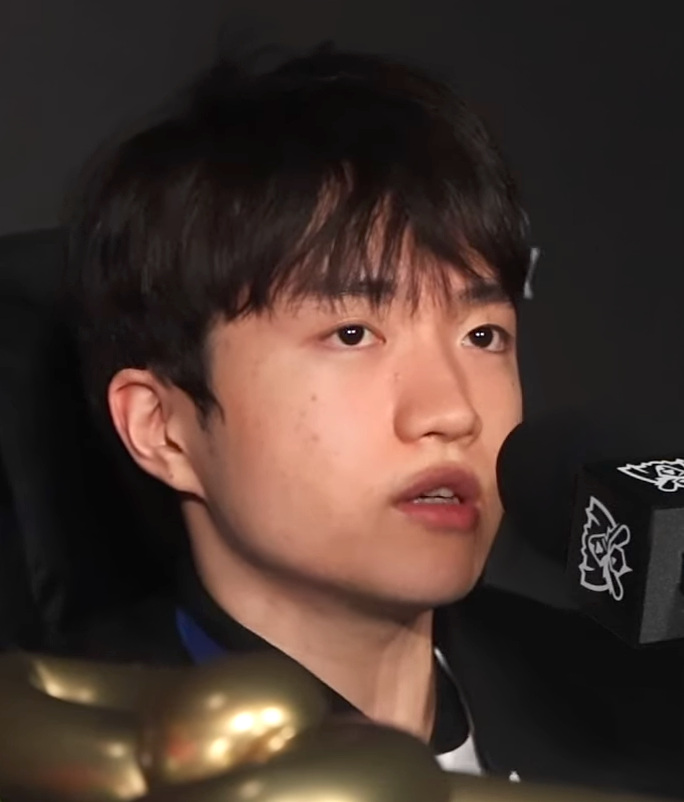
- Keria after winning the 2023 World Championship

Personal information
- Name: 류민석 (Ryu Min-seok)
- Nickname: The Genius Monster (Note: In Korean, 역천괴 or Yeokcheon-goe)
- Born: October 14, 2002 (age 24); Busan, South Korea

Current team
- Team: T1
- Role: Support
- Game: League of Legends
- League: LCK

Career information
- Playing career: 2019–present

Team history
- 2020 (Note: Also competed with DragonX in the 2019 KeSPA Cup): DRX
- 2021–present: T1

Career highlights and awards
- 3× World champion (2023, 2024, 2025); Esports World Cup champion (2024); LCK champion; 2× LCK Season MVP; 5× LCK Supporter of the Year; LCK Player of the Split; 7× LCK First All-Pro Team; 3× LCK Second All-Pro Team; LCK Third All-Pro Team; LCK Young Player Award; KeSPA Cup champion (2025)
Medal record
Esports
Representing South Korea
Asian Games
Gold medal – first place	2026 Aichi-Nagoya	League of Legends
Gold medal – first place	2022 Hangzhou	League of Legends

Ryu Min-seok (Korean: 류민석; born October 14, 2002), better known as Keria, is a South Korean professional League of Legends player for T1. Throughout his career, he has won one League of Legends Champions Korea (LCK) title and three League of Legends World Championship titles. He also represented the South Korean national team at the 2022 and 2026 Asian Games, earning two gold medals.

Keria began his career as a trainee on DragonX in 2018. He competed as a starter for the team beginning in 2020 and reached the LCK Finals in the Summer Split. For the 2021 season, Keria signed with T1. He has reached the LCK Finals five more times, winning it in the 2022 Spring Split. Keria has reached the knockout stage in the World Championship in each of his first five years of play, making it to the quarterfinals in 2020, semifinals in 2021, finals in 2022, and winning the World Championship in 2023, 2024 and 2025.

Keria's individual accomplishments include accolades such becoming the first support player to win the LCK regular season MVP award, two LCK regular season MVP awards in total, five LCK Supporter of the Year awards, one LCK Player of the Split award, and six LCK First All-Pro Team designations.

== Professional career ==
=== DRX ===
In 2018, Keria began his career by joining DragonX (DRX) as a trainee support player, and in November 2019, he was promoted from trainee to the main roster. He made his debut with the team on December 26, 2019, at the KeSPA Cup, where he secured a 2–0 victory against KeG Chungnam. Keria was named the MVP of the match.

In his rookie season, the 2020 LCK Spring Split, Keria had the highest kill participation among all support players in the league at 77.4% through the first half of the regular season. At the end of the regular season, Keria finished in third in the season MVP race, earned a spot on the LCK First All-Pro Team, and received the LCK Young Player Award. DRX had a solid showing in the 2020 LCK Spring Split, finishing with a 14–4 record and on the back of a seven-game winning streak. They entered the playoffs with a bye to the second round but were eliminated in the semifinals by T1. In the Summer Split regular season, Keria led all LCK support players in KDA and kill participation, also topping the league with 401 assists during the regular season. DRX finished the regular season in second place with a 15–3 record. In the playoffs, DRX reached the finals but experienced a one-sided defeat against DAMWON Gaming (DWG), with DWG winning 3–0.

Entering the 2020 League of Legends World Championship as the LCK's second seed, DRX progressed beyond the group stage. However, their Worlds run ended in the playoff quarterfinals against DWG, mirroring their previous encounter in the LCK Summer Split Final. DWG secured a decisive 3–0 victory, resulting in DRX's exit from the Worlds tournament.

=== T1 ===
On November 18, 2020, T1 officially announced the acquisition of Keria for the 2021 season. Despite facing challenges early on in the 2021 LCK Spring Split regular season, T1 finished it with a five-game winning streak, securing a spot in the playoffs. Recognized with the nickname "The Genius Monster," Keria earned a position on the LCK First All-Pro Team for the 2021 LCK Spring Split. In the playoffs, T1 emerged victorious against DRX in the first round but lost to Gen.G in the second round, finishing the split in fourth place. In the Summer Split, T1 finished fourth in the regular season standings with an 11–7 record. Keria secured his second consecutive placement on the LCK First All-Pro team at the end of the regular season. T1 advanced to the LCK Finals in the playoffs, but faced a defeat against DAMWON Gaming, settling for a second-place finish.

In October 2021, T1 defeated Hanwha Life Esports in the LCK regional qualifier finals, securing their place in the group stage of the 2021 World Championship. Progressing beyond the group stage, T1 advanced to the knockout semifinals, where they faced defeat against DWG. In December, Keria was presented the 2021 LCK Supporter of the Year award.

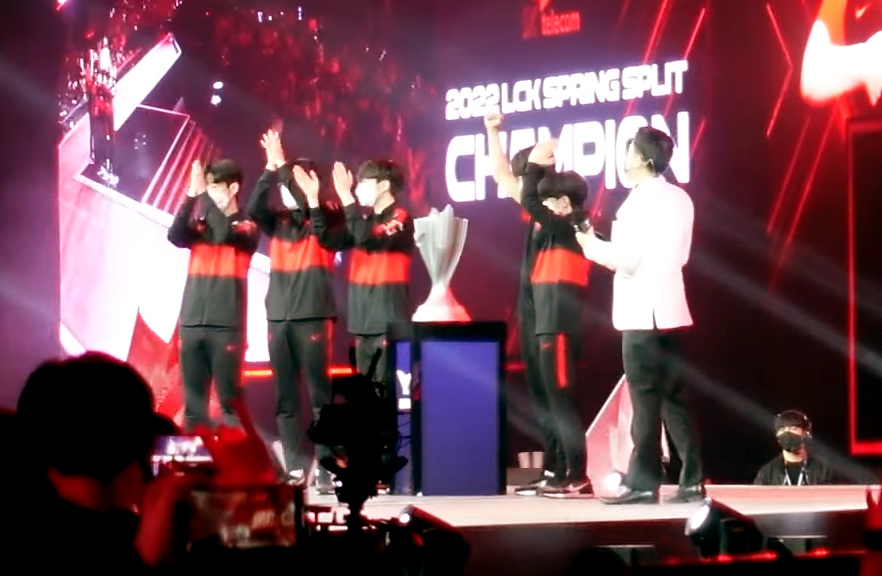
Keria winning his 1st LCK title

In the 2022 LCK Spring Split regular season, T1 achieved an unprecedented feat by concluding with an undefeated 18–0 record, marking the first time in LCK history that a team had accomplished such a perfect run. Keria broke the record for the most assists in a single split, recording 462 assists and surpassing the previous record of 445 set by former SK Telecom T1 support, Lee "Wolf" Jae-wan. Keria's performance earned him the distinction of being named the 2022 LCK Regular Season MVP, making him the first support player to receive this honor. Additionally, he secured a spot on the 2022 LCK First All-Pro team. T1 clinched the LCK title at the end of the split by defeating Gen.G on April 2, 2022, in the LCK Spring Finals, marking Keria's first LCK championship. On April 29, 2022, T1 extended Keria's contract through the end of the 2023 season. With the Spring Split title, Keria participated in his inaugural Mid-Season Invitational (MSI) as T1 qualified for the 2022 MSI as the LCK representative. Although the team reached the finals, they experienced a defeat against Royal Never Give Up, securing a second-place finish. During the 2022 LCK Summer Split, on July 7, Keria recorded his 2,500th assist in the LCK during a match against KT Rolster becoming the eighth support player and the 15th overall player in the LCK to reach this milestone. After T1's win over DWG KIA in the 2022 LCK Summer Split playoff semifinals, Keria was looked visibly ill postgame. He expressed in an interview afterwards that he had been feeling unwell since July, with symptoms such as brain fog and dizziness. T1 lost the 2022 Summer Split finals to Gen.G, finishing in second place.

T1 entered the 2022 World Championship as the LCK's second seed. T1 reached the Worlds finals after T1 defeated JD Gaming in the semifinals, but lost to DRX in the finals by a score of 2–3. After the loss, Keria was visibly upset, as the broadcast showed him shaking and tearing up. At the end of the year, Keria was named the LCK Supporter of the Year.

In the 2023 LCK Spring Split regular season, Keria earned the most Player of the Game awards, securing the Player of the Split title and becoming the first support player in LCK to achieve the recognition. Alongside the entire starting T1 roster, he received a spot on the 2023 LCK Spring First All-Pro Team, and Keria was named the regular season MVP for the second time in his career. Despite their regular season performance, T1 reached the Spring Split playoff finals but once again fell short against Gen.G, finishing in second place. With the second-place finish, T1 qualified for the 2023 Mid-Season Invitational. At MSI, T1 reached the upper bracket finals but faced defeat against JD Gaming, sending them to the lower bracket finals, where they lost to Bilibili Gaming by a score of 1–3. In July 2023, during the 2023 LCK Summer Split, T1 encountered challenges as mid laner Lee "Faker" Sang-hyeok was sidelined due to a wrist injury. Keria's, as well as the entire team's, performance dipped during this period. Upon Faker's return, T1 won their final two matches, concluding the regular season in fifth place with a 9–9 record. On August 20, 2023, Keria made his sixth LCK finals appearance, but T1 faced another defeat against Gen.G in the finals.

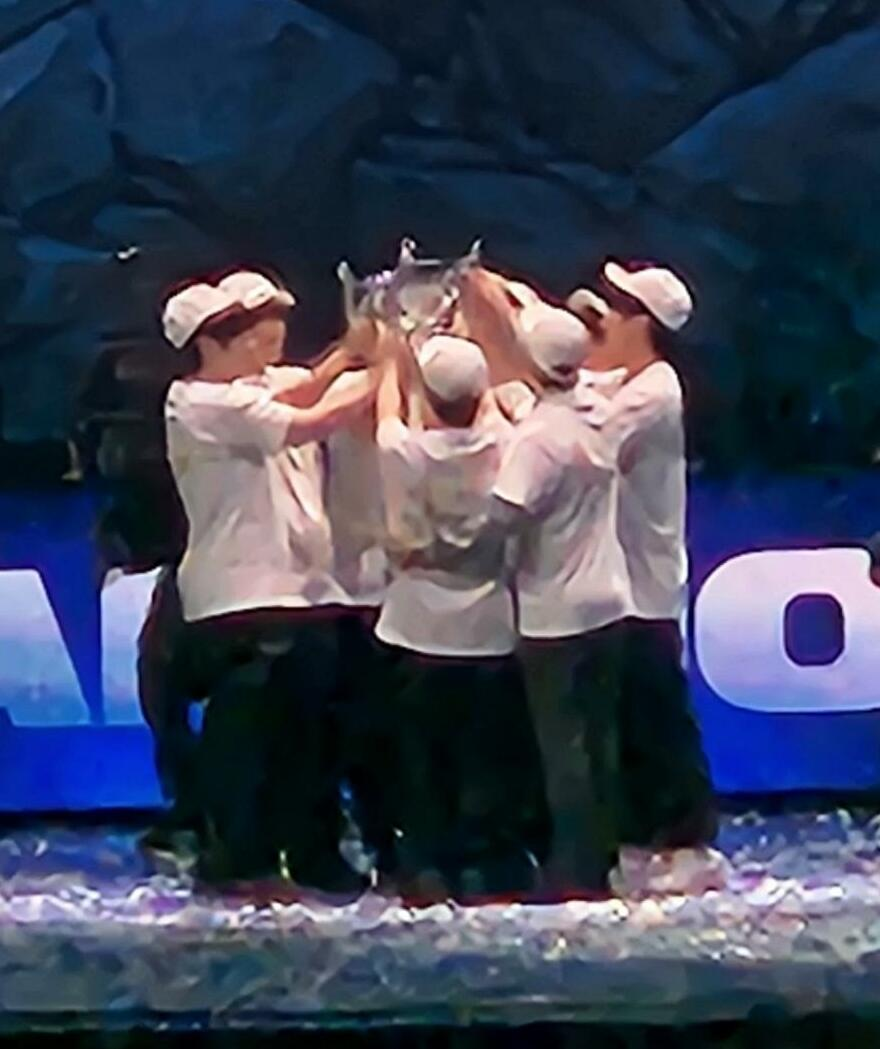
Keria celebrating after winning the 2023 World Championship

T1 entered the 2023 World Championship as the LCK's second seed. Keria reached his second consecutive appearance in the Worlds finals after T1 secured a victory over JD Gaming in the semifinals. In the finals against Weibo Gaming, the first game saw both teams evenly matched until the 18-minute mark, when Keria executed a move called Hostile Takeover. This play allowed teammates Faker and Zeus to secure kills that enabling T1 to establish a significant lead and ultimately secure the victory in the game. T1 carried this momentum to win the following two games as well, resulting in a 3–0 victory and giving Keria his first World Championship title. At the end of the year, Keria received his third consecutive LCK Supporter of the Year award.

In 2026, Ryu Min-seok has finally carved his name on the highest level in the history of the LoL Champions Korea (LCK). He has 6,191 assists in his career. He has surpassed Lee "Faker" Sang-hyuk the previous holder of the record, to become the No. 1 player in LCK's career assists.

== National team career ==
Keria represented South Korea in the 2022 Asian Games one of the six members in the League of Legends division of the South Korea national esports team. Keria clinched a gold medal as South Korea emerged victorious against Saudi Arabia, China, and Chinese Taipei in the quarterfinals, semifinals, and finals, respectively. With the gold medal, Keria received an exemption from mandatory military service. Keria won his second Asian Games gold medal as part of the South Korean team that defended their title at the 2026 Asian Games.

== Seasons overview ==
Year	Team	Domestic					International		
Year	Team	League	Split				First Stand	Mid-Season Invitational	World Championship
Year	Team	League	Cup	Spring	Summer	Season Playoffs	First Stand	Mid-Season Invitational	World Championship
2020	DRX	LCK	—N/a	3rd	2nd	—N/a	—N/a	None held (Note: Cancelled due to the COVID-19 pandemic.)	5th–8th
2021	T1	LCK	—N/a	4th	2nd	—N/a	—N/a	Did not qualify	3rd–4th
2022	T1	LCK	—N/a	1st	2nd	—N/a	—N/a	2nd	2nd
2023	T1	LCK	—N/a	2nd	2nd	—N/a	—N/a	3rd	1st
2024	T1	LCK	—N/a	2nd	3rd	—N/a	—N/a	3rd	1st
2025	T1	LCK	5th	—N/a	—N/a	4th	Did not qualify	2nd	1st
2026	T1	LCK	4th	—N/a	—N/a	3rd	Did not qualify	5th–6th	3rd–4th

== Awards and honors ==
International

- Three-time Worlds champion – 2023, 2024, 2025
- One-time Esports World Cup champion – 2024

LCK

- One-time LCK champion – Spring 2022
- Two-time LCK Season MVP – Spring 2022, Spring 2023
- Five-time LCK Supporter of the Year – 2021, 2022, 2023, 2024, 2025
- One-time LCK Player of the Split – Spring 2023
- One-time LCK Young Player Award recipient – Spring 2020
- Seven-time LCK All-Pro 1st Team – Spring 2020, Spring 2021, Summer 2021, Spring 2022, Spring 2023, Spring 2024, 2026 Season
- Three-time LCK All-Pro 2nd Team – Summer 2020, Summer 2022, 2025 Season
- One-time LCK All-Pro 3rd Team – Summer 2024

South Korea Esports

- Two-time Asian Games gold medal winner – 2022, 2026

Media

- Esports Awards PC Rookie of the Year – 2020

== Personal life ==
Keria was born on October 14, 2002, in Busan, Korea. He began playing video games when he was four years old when his grandmother dropped him and his older brother, Ryu Tae-seok, off at a PC Bang while she was running errands. Raised by his brother, Keria began playing League of Legends in the fifth grade at his brother's suggestion. Although his initial interest in the game was modest, he was inspired after watching a highlight montage featuring the gameplay of Hong "MadLife" Min-gi. Within a span of six months, Keria climbed from the bronze tier to the diamond tier and nurtured aspirations of pursuing a professional career. After three years of play, Keria attained the Challenger rank in the game's solo queue mode.

Keria is also known for his affinity for K-pop. After his team defeated JDG to win the semifinals of the 2023 World Championship, Keria vocally expressed his excitement about seeing NewJeans perform during the opening ceremony of the World Championship Finals. This moment gained attention, even reaching members Hanni and Minji.>
