= Faker (gamer) =

South Korean professional esports player (born 1996)

- Faker in 2026

Personal information
- Name: 이상혁 (Lee Sang-hyeok)
- Nickname: Unkillable Demon King (Note: Various news outlets have commented on Faker being known as the "Unkillable Demon King": Mina Kimes (June 11, 2015). "The Unkillable Demon King". ESPN.; Jacob Wolf (October 26, 2016). "The almighty mid lane: SKT's Faker vs. Samsung's Crown". ESPN.; Julia Lee (February 6, 2017). "Faker broke a Twitch record on his first day streaming". Rift Herald. Archived from the original on November 13, 2023.; Tyler Erzberger (October 31, 2017). "Ambition's and Faker's legacies intertwine once again". ESPN.; Miles Yim (October 2, 2019). "Faker's Michael Jordan-like return highlights League of Legends World Championship story lines". Washington Post.; Tyler Erzberger (November 1, 2019). "How Faker and his father made way for the Unkillable Demon King's return". ESPN.; Jerome Heath (March 5, 2020). "Faker becomes first player to reach 2,000 kills in LCK". Dot Esports.; Matt Porter (December 18, 2020). "10 things you didn't know about League of Legends supremo Faker". Red Bull.; Rich Stanton (December 1, 2022). "'The unkillable demon king' of esports ends speculation and stays put". PC Gamer.; Park Lin (July 7, 2025). "Korea's 'unkillable demon king' to vie for second title at 2025 Esports World Cup in Saudi Arabia". Korea JoongAng Daily.)
- Born: May 7, 1996 (age 30); Seoul, South Korea

Current team
- Team: T1
- Role: Mid
- Game: League of Legends
- League: LCK

Career information
- Playing career: 2013–present

Team history
- 2013–present: T1 (Note: Known as SK Telecom T1 2 in 2013, SK Telecom T1 K in 2014, and SK Telecom T1 from 2014 to 2019.)

Career highlights and awards
- 6× World champion (2013, 2015, 2016, 2023–2025); 2× Worlds Finals MVP (2016, 2024); 2× MSI champion (2016, 2017); MSI Finals MVP (2016); Esports World Cup champion (2024); Esports World Cup Finals MVP (2024); 10× LCK champion; 2× LCK Season MVP; LCK Finals MVP; 2× LCK Player of the Year (2023, 2024); 2× LCK Mid Laner of the Year (2023, 2024); 2× LCK First All-Pro Team; 2× LCK Second All-Pro Team; 2x LCK Third All-Pro Team; KeSPA Cup champion (2025); Rift Rivals champion (2019); IEM champion (2016); All-Star Invitational champion (2014); NLB champion (2014)
Medal record
Esports
Representing South Korea
Asian Games
Gold medal – first place	2026 Aichi-Nagoya	League of Legends
Gold medal – first place	2022 Hangzhou	League of Legends
Silver medal – second place	2018 Jakarta–Palembang	League of Legends

Lee Sang-hyeok (Korean: 이상혁; born May 7, 1996), better known as Faker, is a South Korean professional League of Legends player. Debuting in 2013, he has played as the mid-laner (Note: A League of Legends player who occupies the middle area of the map, typically playing alone during the early part of the game. The position gives a player relatively quick access to other lanes and objectives, making the role highly impactful in professional play.) for T1 (formerly SK Telecom T1) for his entire career. He has won a record 10 League of Legends Champions Korea (LCK) titles, two Mid-Season Invitational (MSI) titles, and a record six World Championship titles. Faker is widely regarded as the greatest League of Legends player in history, (Note: Attributed to multiple references:) and has been compared to basketball player Michael Jordan for his esports success. (Note: Attributed to multiple references:)

Originally from Gangseo District, Seoul, Faker established an early reputation as a dominant solo queue (Note: Solo queue is a single match where five similarly skilled players are randomly assigned to each team. Players may queue alone, or with one friend in lower ranks.) player before being signed by SKT (Note: Previous name for T1 when SK Telecom was their title sponsor.) in 2013 at the age of 17. In his debut year he won an LCK title and the World Championship. From 2014 to 2017, he won five further LCK titles, two MSI titles, and two additional World Championship titles. From 2018 to 2022, he won four more LCK titles but did not win another major international championship. He won the 2023, 2024 and 2025 World Championships, making him the first player to win three consecutive Worlds (Note: Shorthand for League of Legends World Championship.) titles. He represented the South Korean national team at the 2018, 2022 and 2026 Asian Games, earning a silver and two gold medals respectively.

Faker's individual achievements include accolades such as two World Championship Most Valuable Player (MVP) awards, an MSI MVP award, and two LCK Player of the Year awards. He holds several LCK records, including being the first player to reach 1,000, 2,000, and 3,000 kills (Note: In-game opponents directly eliminated by the player.), the first to reach 5,000 assists (Note: In-game contributions to eliminating an opponent without delivering the final blow.), and the first to have won 700 games. His accomplishments have earned him recognition as the Best Esports Athlete at The Game Awards, and he was named PC Player of the Decade by the Esports Awards in 2025. He was listed among the Time 100 Most Influential People in Sports in 2026. He was inducted into the ESL Esports Hall of Fame in 2019, and in May 2024, Riot Games announced him as the inaugural inductee for the LoL Esports Hall of Legends.

Faker is a marketing and media figure for esports, appearing in commercials for major brands and on television and talk shows. In 2020, he became a part-owner and executive of T1 Entertainment & Sports. His annual salary, as of 2020, was estimated by the Olympics to be nearly US$5 million.

== Early life ==
Faker was born in Seoul on May 7, 1996. His early years were spent under the care of his grandparents and his father, Lee Kyung-joon, in Gangseo District, Seoul. He was described as an introverted child by his father. While he did not play computer games extensively during his youth, he did enjoy playing arcade games such as Tekken and King of Fighters. As time passed, he gradually ventured into the realm of PC gaming, exploring titles such as Maplestory and Warcraft III.

In 2011, when League of Legends made its debut in South Korea, Faker quickly embraced the game and began playing the game's ranked mode after his high matchmaking rating (MMR) significantly increased queue times for unranked matches. While attending Mapo High School (the same school his rival Kim "Deft" Hyuk-kyu attended), Faker asked his father if he could drop out of school to pursue a career in esports. His father granted his request a month later.

== Professional career ==
=== Rookie season success (2013) ===
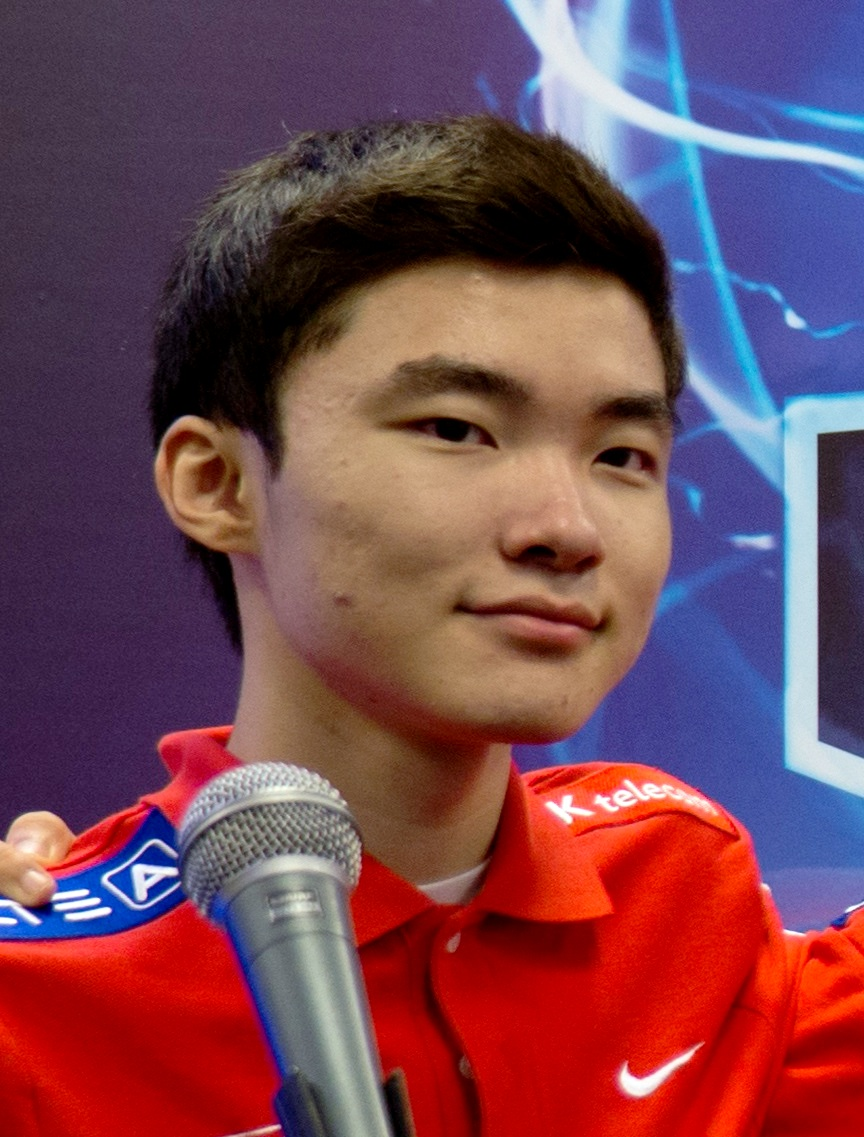
Faker after winning the 2013 World Championship

Faker began his professional career in 2013 when he caught the attention of SK Telecom T1 2 (later known as SK Telecom T1 K), a team affiliated with the SK Telecom T1 organization. Originally competing under the alias GoJeonPa (Note: Means "Old School" in Korean.), Faker joined the team as their mid laner, subsequently adopting the name Faker as his gaming handle. He made his professional debut on April 6, 2013, at a televised match held in Seoul, South Korea, where he secured a solo kill (Note: A kill where only two players are involved in combat and one emerges victorious.) against the South Korean All-Star mid laner Kang "Ambition" Chan-yong. In his first professional tournament, OGN Champions Korea 2013 Spring, Faker accounted for 31.6% of his team's kills and secured 133 kills over 20 games, positioning himself as the tournament's third highest performer in both categories. The subsequent split, OGN Champions Korea 2013 Summer, SKT T1 2 advanced to the tournament finals, where they faced off against the KT Rolster Bullets. In the match, Faker was suddenly engaged by Yoo "Ryu" Sang-wook from the Bullets, but Faker performed a "startling set of moves" to reverse the situation and kill Ryu. This play is regarded as one of the most famous League of Legends plays of all time; it not only propelled SKT T1 2 to a reverse sweep 3–2 victory over the Bullets but also marked Faker's first major title win. In Fall 2013, SKT T1 2 represented South Korea and the SK Telecom T1 organization at the Season 3 World Championship, commonly referred to as Worlds. Throughout the tournament, they had a record of 15 wins and 3 losses. SKT T1 2 faced off against China's Royal Club in the finals and won in one of the most lopsided finals in League of Legends history at the time.

=== Five more international titles (2014–2017) ===
Faker won his second domestic title in 2014, as SKT followed their 2013 success by going the entire OGN Champions Winter 2013–2014 season without losing a single game. After losing in the quarterfinals of Champions Spring 2014, the team won All-Star Paris 2014, the precursor to the Mid-Season Invitational (MSI). Competing back again in Champions Summer 2014, while the team qualified for the playoffs, they were eliminated again in the quarterfinals. At the 2014 League of Legends World Championship qualifiers, SKT faced Samsung Galaxy White in a deciding qualifier match. In the match, Faker was the first player to die (known as "giving away First Blood") in three consecutive games, as SKT lost the match and did not qualify for the World Championship. In the following offseason, Riot Games introduced new regulations stating that each organization could only have one team participating in each league, leading to the merger of SK Telecom's two teams, SKT T1 K and SKT T1 S, which became simply known as SK Telecom T1.

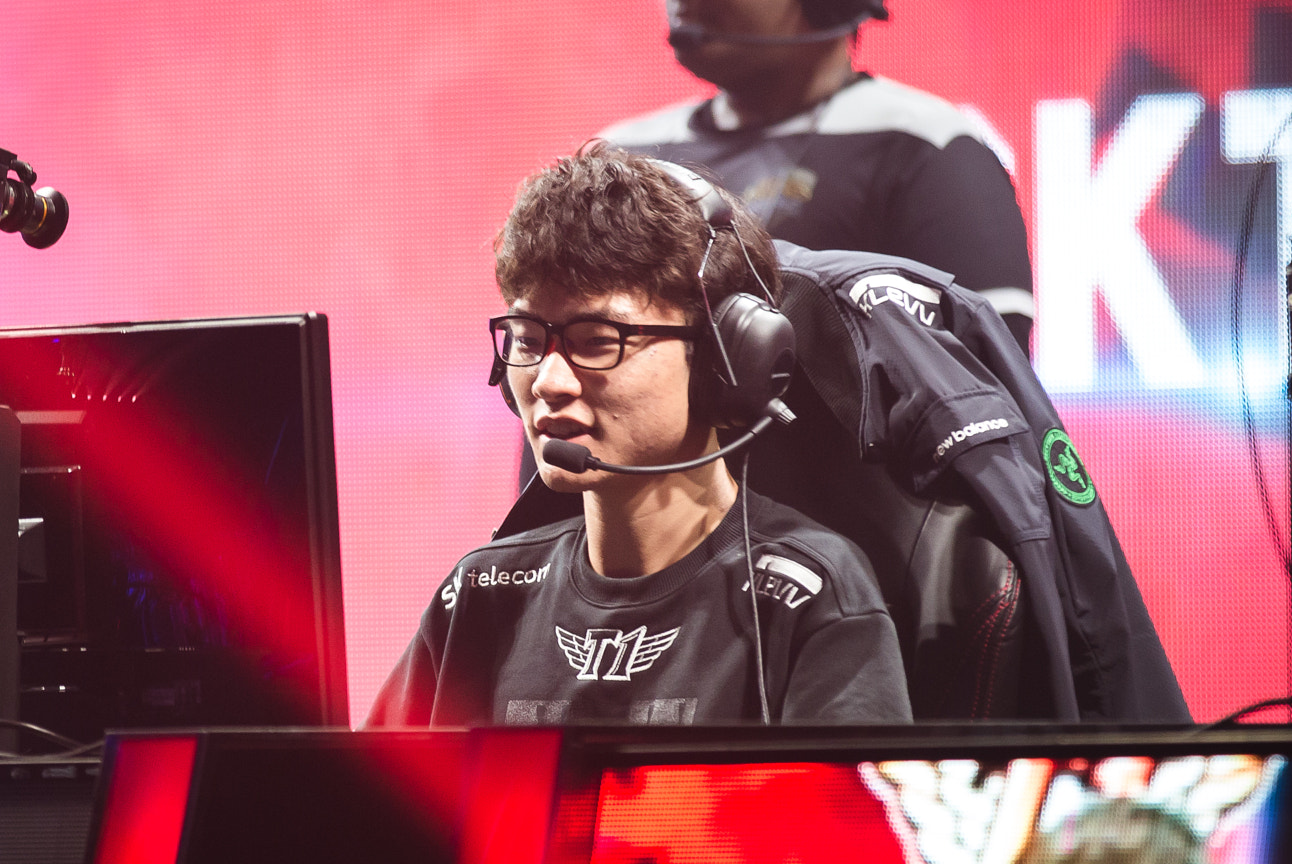
Faker competing at the 2015 World Championship

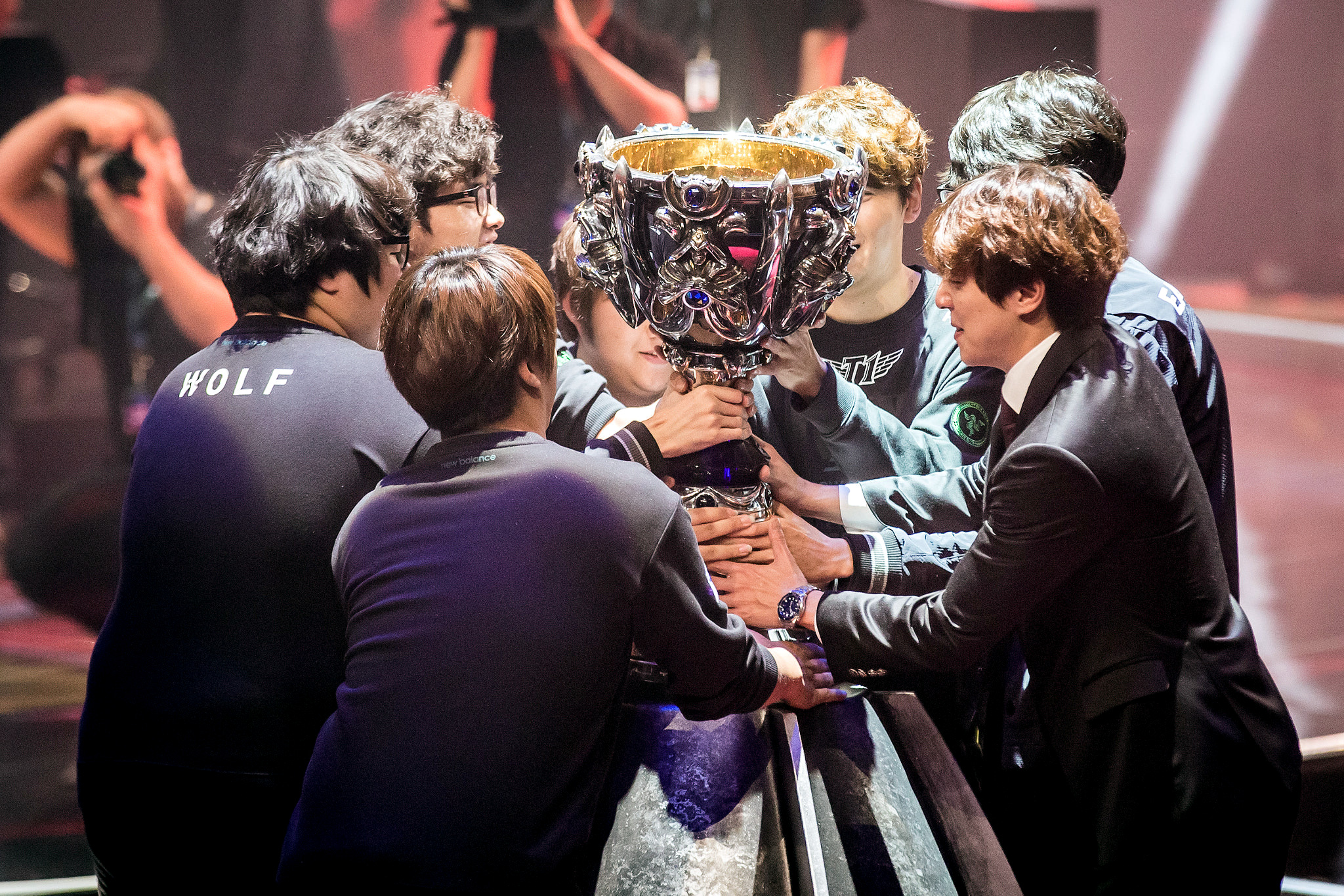
Faker (leftmost in back row) celebrating with SKT T1 after winning the 2015 World Championship

During the 2015 offseason, Faker re-signed with SK Telecom, despite receiving offers of nearly US$1,000,000 (equivalent to $1,359,994 in 2025) from various Chinese companies. Throughout the 2015 LCK season, Faker shared the mid lane position with teammate Lee "Easyhoon" Ji-hoon. Although Faker started the Spring Split season opening match against NaJin e-mFire, he was benched (Note: Replaced from the main roster by another player) in the second game after losing the first, with Easyhoon taking his place. However, Faker returned for the third game and led his team to victory by securing a pentakill. In the 2015 LCK Spring Split finals, Easyhoon started all three games, resulting in SKT's victory. Despite SKT winning the split, Faker expressed dissatisfaction with the outcome and stated his determination to deliver a better performance than Easyhoon in the future. During the break between splits, SKT participated in the 2015 Mid-Season Invitational, reaching the finals where they faced Edward Gaming in a best-of-five match. Throughout the tournament, Easyhoon played as the team's starting mid laner, but Faker was subbed in for game four after SKT fell behind 1–2. They won game four, and in game five Faker selected the champion LeBlanc, a character with which he had never lost in competitive play. However, EDG appeared to have prepared for this exact situation, picking an unconventional midlane champion in Morgana as a counter to LeBlanc. SKT lost the final game, resulting in a second-place finish. During the 2015 LCK Summer Split, SKT advanced to the finals against KT Rolster. While Easyhoon had been the primary mid laner for most of the split's matches, Faker played all three games of the finals and won, winning his fourth LCK title. By this point in his career, Faker had garnered several nicknames, including the "Unkillable Demon King" and "God".

SKT successfully secured a spot in the 2015 League of Legends World Championship, with Faker solidifying his position as the starting mid laner. Easyhoon only participated in four matches during the tournament, allegedly serving the purpose of "keeping Faker's ego in check", as stated by SKT coaches. Over the course of the tournament, SKT only lost game three of the Finals against KOO Tigers, as the team went on to win their second Worlds title by a score of 3–1. With the win, Faker became one of two players to have ever won the title twice. Following the victory, Faker garnered attention for his unconventional celebration, as he consumed a raw stalk of broccoli on stage.

Faker started the 2016 year by winning the IEM Season X World Championship. This accomplishment was followed by a win in the 2016 LCK Spring Split finals. Due to their performance in the Spring Split, SKT earned a spot in the 2016 Mid-Season Invitational. Despite a moderately balanced group stage performance, with a 6–4 record, SKT ultimately claimed the championship title by sweeping Counter Logic Gaming 3–0 in the finals. Faker's gameplay throughout the tournament, including the second-most kills of any player in the tournament, earned him the MVP title, marking the first time he had been named MVP at either MSI or Worlds. On July 11, 2016, during the 2016 LCK Summer Split Faker became the first player in the history of the LCK to secure 1,000 kills. While SKT fell short of winning their fourth consecutive LCK title after a loss to KT Rolster in the playoffs, their overall performance during the season still earned them a qualification for the 2016 World Championship. In the World Championship, SKT reached the finals against Samsung Galaxy, with SKT winning a close 3–2 series. Faker claimed his third world championship title and was named the MVP of the tournament. By the end of 2016, Faker had gained widespread recognition and had been referred to as "the Michael Jordan of esports".

In the lead-up to the 2017 season, Faker extended his contract with SKT. The contract, as stated by an SKT press release, was hailed as the "best contract in esports history". During the 2017 LCK Spring Split, Faker secured another LCK title, after the team swept KT Rolster with a 3–0 victory in the finals. At the 2017 Mid-Season Invitational, SKT finished atop their group with an 8–2 record. In the finals, they defeated G2 Esports, becoming the first team ever to win two consecutive Mid-Season Invitationals. However, in the subsequent LCK Summer Split, the team often found themselves falling behind early in matches and struggled to maintain their previous form. Despite this, SKT managed to reach the LCK Summer Finals, where they lost to Longzhu Gaming. The team qualified for the 2017 League of Legends World Championship and reached the finals, with Faker being the sole member of SKT to participate in four World Championship finals. Prior to the finals against Samsung Galaxy, Faker ranked second among all mid laners in the tournament for kills and assists. He also held the distinction of having played the highest number of unique champions in the event. SKT lost in the World Championship finals against Samsung Galaxy, with a score of 0–3. This loss marked Faker's first World Championship finals defeat and left him visibly upset, requiring consolation from his teammates to gather himself and shake hands with the Samsung Galaxy players post-game.

=== International shortcomings (2018–2022) ===
Following the conclusion of the 2017 season, SKT underwent a moderate rebuild, and Faker struggled to find success throughout the 2018 season. As the 2018 LCK Summer Split began, Faker found himself benched in favor of Choi "Pirean" Jun-sik starting from July 21, 2018. SKT's struggles continued throughout the summer split, and they failed to qualify for the playoffs, as they were unable to advance past the group stage. Faker made a return to the starting lineup for the LCK Regional Finals 2018, which served as qualifiers for the 2018 League of Legends World Championship. However, SKT could not secure a spot at Worlds 2018, marking an end to their 2018 season.

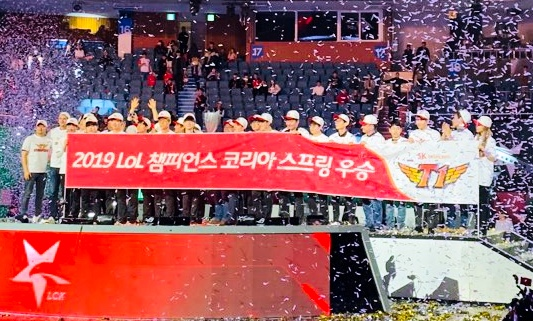
Faker celebrating with SKT after winning the 2019 LCK Spring Finals

In preparation for the 2019 season, SKT again underwent significant changes to their roster, but they retained Faker. Faker and SKT won the 2019 LCK Spring Split, as they defeated Griffin in the finals. The win marked Faker's seventh LCK title. In May 2019, SKT represented the LCK at the 2019 Mid-Season Invitational, where they were ultimately defeated by G2 Esports in the semifinals. Following the MSI, SKT participated in the 2019 Rift Rivals event, where teams from the LCK, LPL, LMS, and VCS competed. SKT, alongside three other LCK teams, clinched their league's first Rift Rivals championship title by defeating LPL teams. After winning Rift Rivals, Faker became the first player to have won all of the Riot-organized League of Legends international tournaments — All-Stars, Rift Rivals, MSI and Worlds. In the 2019 LCK Summer Split, SKT found themselves in ninth place in the league standings, leading to Faker being benched for a match against Griffin. However, SKT ultimately won the 2019 LCK Summer Split by defeating Griffin in the playoff finals, giving Faker his eighth LCK title. At the 2019 World Championship, Faker became the first player to reach 100 international wins, after SKT defeated Splyce in the quarterfinals. SKT were defeated in the semifinals by G2 Esports, marking the first time that Faker had been eliminated from Worlds before the finals.

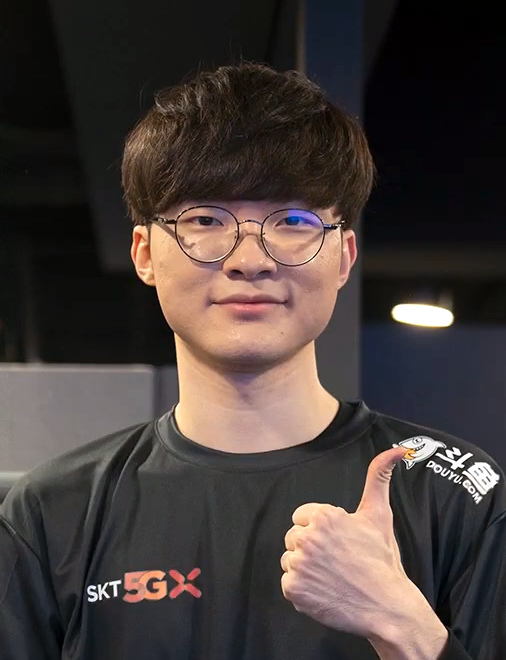
Faker in a 2020 interview

After the 2019 season, SK Telecom T1 underwent a rebrand and became known simply as T1. In February 2020, T1 announced that Faker had renewed his contract with the organization for three years, and as part of the deal, Faker also became a co-owner of T1 Entertainment and Sports, taking on a player-executive role. On March 5, 2020, during the 2020 LCK season, Faker became the first player to secure 2,000 kills in the LCK. At that point, Faker had a career win rate of 67.4% in the LCK, with 357 wins and 173 losses. In April 2020, he surpassed Go "Score" Dong-bin for the most games played in the LCK, reaching a total of 545 games. Faker and T1 went on to win the 2020 LCK Spring finals against Gen.G, marking Faker's ninth LCK championship. However, in the Summer Split starting in July 2020, Faker was often benched in favor of Lee "Clozer" Ju-hyeon, who had recently turned 17. In the playoffs, Faker was subbed in for the second game against Afreeca Freecs, but ultimately, T1 was eliminated from the competition. In the LCK regional qualifier for the 2020 World Championship, Faker returned to the starting roster. T1 defeated Afreeca Freecs in the semifinals but lost to Gen.G in the finals, failing to qualify for the World Championship.

In the 2021 LCK Spring Split, Faker elected to bench himself for three weeks following T1's loss to DRX on February 19, stating that he needed time off to improve. He returned to the starting roster on March 13, 2021, and secured a victory over Gen.G. In the Spring Split playoffs, T1 faced Gen.G in the semifinals but ended up losing the series. In the Summer Split, T1 reached the playoff finals, where they ultimately lost to DWG KIA to finish in second place. In the LCK Regional Finals, T1 defeated Hanwha Life Esports, securing their place in the 2021 World Championship group stage. As T1 prepared for the group stage of the World Championship, Faker was now the most experienced player on the team, having competed in over 150 games between MSI and Worlds, compared to his teammates, who collectively had played 65 games in international competitions. T1 finished at the top of their group and advanced made it to the semifinals, where they were defeated 2–by DWG KIA.

During the offseason before the 2022 season, Faker's contract with T1 expired, and he received an offer of US$20,000,000 (equivalent to $23,762,741 in 2025) per year from a Chinese team competing in the LPL, according to T1 CEO Joe Marsh. Faker elected to stay with T1. In the 2022 season, which marked Faker's 10th year as a professional player, he achieved several milestones in the 2022 LCK Spring Split. He became the first player in the LCK to reach both 2,500 kills and 700 games. Additionally, on February 18, 2022, Faker played his 1,000th professional game, becoming the second player in League of Legends history to reach the milestone. T1's finished the 2022 Spring Split regular season with an undefeated 18–0 record, an achievement that had not been accomplished by any team in the history of the LCK. Faker's performance earned him a place on the LCK's first All-Pro team, an accolade he had not received since 2020. T1 excelled in the Spring Split playoffs, culminating in a 3–1 victory over Gen.G in the finals. This marked Faker's and T1's 10th LCK title. At the 2022 Mid-Season Invitational, T1 reached the finals for the first time since 2017 after defeating G2 Esports in the semifinals. However, they lost 2–3 to Royal Never Give Up (RNG) in the MSI finals. On July 8, in a match against Gen.G the 2022 LCK Summer split, Faker became first player to achieve 500 wins in the LCK. However, T1's success in the Summer Split playoffs was short-lived, as they were defeated 0–3 by Gen.G in the finals. T1 secured their qualification for the 2022 World Championship. During the group stage, Faker became the first player to participate in 100 games at the World Championship, with his record standing at 72 wins and 28 losses. Additionally, Faker surpassed Jian "Uzi" Zi-Hao to claim the record for the most kills in World Championship history, accumulating over 350 kills across multiple editions of the tournament. Advancing to the World Championship finals, T1 faced off against DRX, where Faker played against his high school peer, Kim "Deft" Hyuk-kyu. T1 fell short in the series, ultimately losing to DRX 2–3 in what is regarded by many as one of the biggest upsets in League of Legends esports history.

=== Three consecutive Worlds titles (2023–2025) ===
From left to right: Gumayusi, Faker, Oner and Zeus at a 2023 LCK Awards press conference

During the 2023 LCK Spring Split, Faker achieved another LCK record. On January 20, 2023, in a match against KT Rolster, Faker surpassed Kang "GorillA" Beom-hyeon to claim the record for the most career assists in the history of the LCK at 4,137. On July 2, in the 2023 LCK Summer Split, Faker was sidelined due to an arm injury. His absence from competitive play extended for a duration of four weeks. During this time, T1's record fell from 6–2 to 7–9. Faker returned to the starting roster on August 2, helping the team defeat the Kwangdong Freecs. Winning their last game of the season, T1 finished with a 9–9 record, securing the fifth seed in the LCK Summer playoffs. T1 reached the LCK Summer finals, where they lost to Gen.G. Finishing with the most championship points in the LCK, the team qualified for the 2023 World Championship, marking Faker's eighth Worlds appearance. Faker won his fourth Worlds title on November 19, 2023, after T1 defeated Weibo Gaming with a 3–0 scoreline in the finals. With the win, Faker became the first person to win four World Championship titles and, at age 27, the oldest player to win one. At the 2023 LCK Awards ceremony in December, Faker was named the Mid Laner of the Year and the Player of the Year.

On February 1, 2024, Faker picked up his 600th win in the LCK in a match against DRX, becoming the first player to reach the milestone. Two days later, against the team OK Brion, Faker became the first player in LCK history to reach 3,000 kills. On April 7, 2024, in a regular season match against Dplus Kia, Faker earned his 5000th career assist in the LCK, becoming the first player in history to do so. Faker became the first player to achieve 100 wins in World Championship after defeating G2 Esports. On November 2, 2024, Faker earned his fifth Worlds title at the O2 Arena. He was selected as the Finals MVP, which marked his second FMVP (Note: Finals MVP) title at the World Championship. On the same day, he also became the first player to have reached 500 kills on Worlds stage.

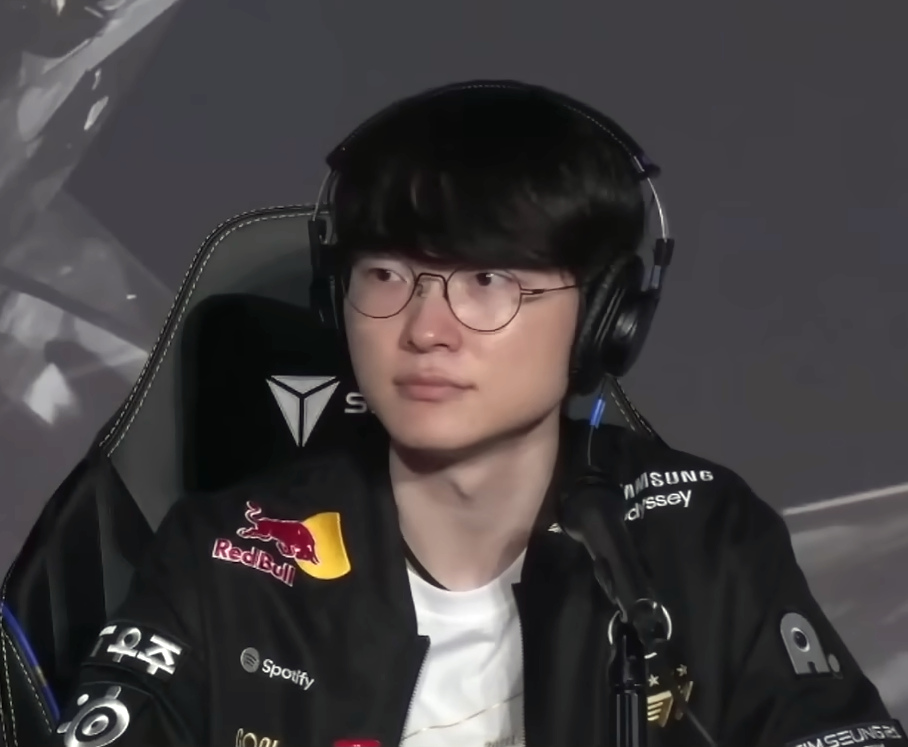
Faker at the 2025 Worlds Finals post-game press conference

With T1 heading into the 2025 season with a new top laner, Faker and the roster qualified as the second LCK seed for the 2025 Mid-Season Invitational after defeating Hanwha Life Esports 3–0 in the Road to MSI bracket. There, the team ultimately made it to their fifth MSI final in the organization's history, but fell short after losing to fellow LCK representative Gen.G 2–3 in a close series. In the second part of the newly revamped LCK season, Faker and T1 defeated Gen.G 2–1 in their homecoming event to end Gen.G's 28-match win streak and T1's 12-match losing streak against Gen.G in the LCK. During their second homecoming event against Nongshim RedForce, it was announced that Faker signed a four year extension with T1, in which he agreed to remain with the team until 2029. The team comfortably secured a spot in the 2025 LCK playoffs, where they qualified to the 2025 League of Legends World Championship after defeating Dplus KIA in round 2 of the lower bracket. The team qualified for the play-in stage of the World Championship as the fourth and final seed from the LCK, after losing to Gen.G 2–3 in round 3 of the lower bracket which ended their run in the LCK playoffs.

At the World Championship, the team defeated Invictus Gaming 3–1 in the play-in stage to qualify for the swiss stage. Despite a poor start to the swiss stage after notably losing to CTBC Flying Oyster in round 1, they qualified to the knockout stage with an overall 3–2 record after defeating 100 Thieves and Movistar KOI in the later rounds. In the knockout stage, the team eliminated the last two remaining teams from China's LPL which extended Faker's undefeated series record of 13–0 against LPL teams in best-of-fives at Worlds, defeating Anyone's Legend in the quarterfinals in a close 3–2 scoreline, and Top Esports in the semifinals with a dominant 3–0 sweep. In Faker's eighth overall Worlds final, T1 defeated fellow LCK representatives KT Rolster with a 3–2 scoreline to win the organization's third consecutive Worlds title, as Faker subsequently became the first player to win six World Championships.

=== KeSPA Cup win and World Championship semifinals (2026–present) ===
Before the start of the 2026 LCK season, Faker participated in and won his first KeSPA Cup after defeating Hanwha Life Esports 3–2 in the final. T1 ultimately had a rough start to the season as they did not qualify for the 2026 First Stand Tournament, losing to Dplus KIA with a 2–3 scoreline in the playoffs of the 2026 LCK Cup Finals. Faker and the team's form improved in the second part of the season, finishing in 2nd place of the double round-robin to advance to the Road to MSI bracket. There, they defeated longtime rivals Gen.G 3–2 to qualify as the LCK's second seed of the 2026 Mid-Season Invitational, where they started in the play-in stage. They subsequently lost to G2 Esports in the lower bracket of the event, marking the first time in the organisation's history that they finished outside of the top four in any international event. Despite the setback, Faker and the team qualified for the 2026 League of Legends World Championship as the third seed of the LCK, after defeating Dplus KIA in the third round of the lower bracket. Participating in the event as the three-time defending champions, the team made it to the semifinals of the event, where they proceeded to lose to eventual champions Bilibili Gaming by a 3–1 scoreline. Notably, the loss marked the first time that Faker and T1 lost to a team from the LPL in the knockout stage of the World Championship, and the first time since 2021 that Faker did not appear in the finals of the event.

== National team career ==
Faker represented South Korea in the League of Legends demonstration event at the 2018 Asian Games. The tournament took place at BritAma Arena at Mahaka Square in Jakarta, Indonesia, from August 27 to 29, 2018. Faker expressed feeling a greater sense of pressure compared to regular League of Legends competitions due to the diverse viewership demographic at the Asian Games. The South Korean team earned a silver medal after a 1–3 loss to China in the finals.

Faker once again represented South Korea in the 2022 Asian Games as one of six members of the League of Legends division of the South Korea national esports team. While he took home a gold medal in the event, Faker was absent from later knockout matches due to suffering from symptoms of the flu. The South Korean team defeated Saudi Arabia, China, and Chinese Taipei in the quarterfinals, semifinals, and finals, respectively. With the gold medal, Faker received an exemption from mandatory military service.

In an interview with The Korea Herald, Faker expressed interest in representing South Korea during the 2026 Asian Games. He stated that "If I get to compete, it would be very meaningful. I've always wanted to take part." In May 2026, Faker was subsequently chosen to represent the national esports team of South Korea for the third consecutive time.

Chosen alongside current teammate Ryu "Keria" Min-seok, former teammates Lee "Gumayusi" Min-hyeong and Choi "Zeus" Woo-je, and new additions Kim "Canyon" Geon-bu and Kim "Zeka" Geon-woo, the South Korean national team finished at the top of Group B with a 3–0 record. In the knockout stage, the team defeated Saudi Arabia 2–0 in the semi-finals and defeated Chinese Taipei 3–0 in the final to secure Faker his second consecutive gold medal at the Asian Games.

== Media figure ==
=== Endorsements and media ===
Faker's handprint and signature promoting a Republic of Gamers store in Taiwan

Faker has become a prominent figure in marketing campaigns for various brands. Companies such as Nike, Razer, Red Bull, and Creative Artists Agency have used Faker's image to promote their products and services. In 2017, Faker served as an advertising model for the Philippines' Bacchus energy drink. Lotte Confectionery introduced an ice cream brand named after him in 2020. Faker has also appeared in commercials alongside notable personalities, such as footballer Son Heung-min to endorse SK Telecom products. In 2023, Razer unveiled a customized "Faker Edition" of their DeathAdder V3 Pro mouse.

Faker made an appearance on the KBS2 talk show Hello Counselor in November 2018 and was featured on the esports talk show The Dreamer in July 2020. In August 2025, he made a cameo on the music video for Stray Kids' "Ceremony", portraying himself gaming and doing his signature "shush" pose.

In December 2025, Faker participated in an interview alongside Kim Min-seok, then-Prime Minister of South Korea. They subsequently discussed the impact of esports in South Korea and the video game industry overall.

=== Philanthropy ===
Following his absence from the 2018 World Championship, Faker announced his decision to donate all the revenue generated from his streaming activities in October 2018 to the UN Foundation.

On March 5, 2020, Faker publicly announced a donation of ₩30 million (US$25,000) to the Community Chest of Korea to combat the COVID-19 pandemic. In January 2022, Faker donated ₩50 million (US$41,700) to the Seoul Social Welfare Fund. As a result of his contributions, his name was honored on the wall of fame in Seoul's Gangseo District. The following August, Faker donated ₩30 million to the Hope Bridge National Disaster Relief Association, contributing to the aid efforts for victims affected by the 2022 floods in South Korea.

=== Streaming ===
On February 6, 2017, Faker embarked on his first livestream on Twitch, attracting a peak viewership of 245,100 viewers. This viewership figure set a record for the highest number of concurrent viewers for an individual streamer in the history of the platform. However, in early 2018, Tyler1, another popular League of Legends streamer, surpassed Faker's record. Tyler1's stream quickly amassed 300,000 viewers within 20 minutes, surpassing Faker's previous achievement and causing a temporary overload on Twitch's servers.

Through an exclusive streaming contract between T1 and AfreecaTV, Faker began streaming on AfreecaTV in June 2022.

In February 2025, Faker announced that he would host a Q&A livestream with Razer at their headquarters to celebrate 10 years of partnering with the company.

Faker has been noted for almost never using in-game skins in both his livestreams and professional matches. He explained in an interview with Sheep Esports that he often played without skins when he was younger because he needed to buy pre-paid cards to purchase in-game currency, and now trains without them to avoid distractions from skins that change the characters' animations and colors.

== Legacy ==
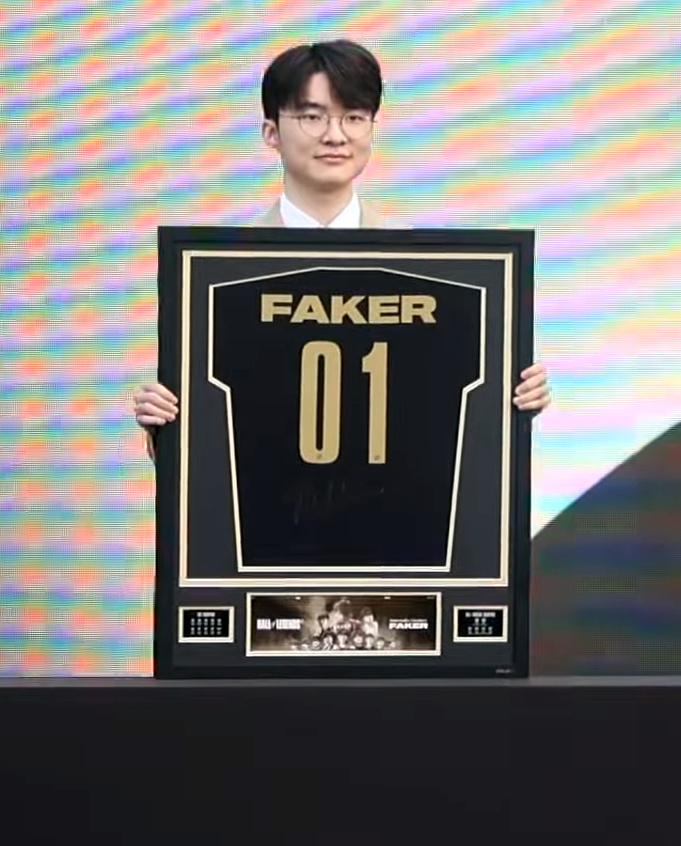
Faker holding his Hall of Legends jersey in 2024

Faker has been described as one of the most influential figures in League of Legends. ESPN's retrospective on the first ten years of the World Championship described him as being "near-universally accepted as the best League player of all time." He has been described by some as the greatest esports player of all time, and his status in esports has been compared to that of Michael Jordan in basketball.

Other professional players have described him as being an influence on their playstyles. In 2016, Edward Gaming's mid laner Lee "Scout" Ye-chan described Faker as his "role model". In 2022, Rasmus "Caps" Winther said that Faker was "a big inspiration" to him and that he "wanted to become good at League after seeing [Faker] at Season 3 Worlds". The Republic of Korea's Ministry of Culture, Sports and Tourism described him as the "most iconic professional player" in the history of esports and noted that he was so well known in South Korea that "even non-gamers know his name". His cultural influence in South Korea has been compared to K-pop group BTS. In 2026, Lee Jung-hoon, Secretary General of the LCK, stated "I believe his presence has been the biggest factor in bringing esports into the mainstream." Wired stated that the prominence of Faker and other Korean professionals has contributed to an idealized perception of Korean esports, noting that even Faker does not occupy the same level of national celebrity as Korea's most prominent traditional sports figures.

On May 22, 2024, Riot Games announced that Faker was chosen as their inaugural entry into the Hall of Legends, being officially inducted in a private ceremony at The Shilla Seoul in South Korea on June 6, 2024. A documentary on his career was released on June 15, 2024, in partnership with Mercedes-Benz. John Needham, Riot Games' president of esports, described Faker as "the most iconic and influential figure in League of Legends and esports history".

== Litigation ==
On July 19, 2022, Faker and T1 filed criminal complaints via law firm Apex Law LLC against a group of individuals under Article 311 of South Korea's Criminal Act which criminalizes public insults online. The complaints were described by the attorneys as targeted comments that included insults toward Faker's mother and offensive drawings.

== Seasons overview ==
Year	Team	Domestic						Regional	International		
Year	Team	League	Split					Rift Rivals	First Stand	Mid-Season Invitational	World Championship
Year	Team	League	Cup	Winter	Spring	Summer	Season Playoffs	Rift Rivals	First Stand	Mid-Season Invitational	World Championship
2013	SK Telecom T1 K	Champions	—N/a	—	3rd	1st	—N/a	—N/a	—N/a	—N/a	1st
2014	SK Telecom T1 K	Champions	—N/a	1st	5th–8th	5th–8th	—N/a	—N/a	—N/a	—N/a	Did not qualify
2015	SK Telecom T1	LCK	—N/a	—N/a	1st	1st	—N/a	—N/a	—N/a	2nd	1st
2016	SK Telecom T1	LCK	—N/a	—N/a	1st	3rd	—N/a	—N/a	—N/a	1st	1st
2017	SK Telecom T1	LCK	—N/a	—N/a	1st	2nd	—N/a	2nd	—N/a	1st	2nd
2018	SK Telecom T1	LCK	—N/a	—N/a	4th	7th	—N/a	2nd	—N/a	Did not qualify	Did not qualify
2019	SK Telecom T1	LCK	—N/a	—N/a	1st	1st	—N/a	1st	—N/a	3rd–4th	3rd–4th
2020	T1	LCK	—N/a	—N/a	1st	5th	—N/a	—N/a	—N/a	None held (Note: Cancelled due to the COVID-19 pandemic.)	Did not qualify
2021	T1	LCK	—N/a	—N/a	4th	2nd	—N/a	—N/a	—N/a	Did not qualify	3rd–4th
2022	T1	LCK	—N/a	—N/a	1st	2nd	—N/a	—N/a	—N/a	2nd	2nd
2023	T1	LCK	—N/a	—N/a	2nd	2nd	—N/a	—N/a	—N/a	3rd	1st
2024	T1	LCK	—N/a	—N/a	2nd	3rd	—N/a	—N/a	—N/a	3rd	1st
2025	T1	LCK	5th	—N/a	—N/a	—N/a	4th	—N/a	Did not qualify	2nd	1st
2026	T1	LCK	4th	—N/a	—N/a	—N/a	3rd	—N/a	Did not qualify	5th–6th	3rd–4th

== Awards, accomplishments and honors ==
=== International ===
- Six-time Worlds champion – 2013, 2015, 2016, 2023, 2024, 2025
  - Two-time Worlds Finals MVP – 2016, 2024
- Two-time Mid-Season Invitational champion – 2016, 2017
  - One-time Mid-Season Invitational Finals MVP – 2016
- One-time Esports World Cup champion – 2024
  - One-time Esports World Cup Finals MVP – 2024

=== Regional ===
- One-time Rift Rivals champion – 2019

=== LCK ===
- 10-time LCK champion – Summer 2013, Winter 2014, Spring 2015, Summer 2015, Spring 2016, Spring 2017, Spring 2019, Summer 2019, Spring 2020, Spring 2022
- Two-time LCK Season MVP – Summer 2013, Winter 2014
- One-time LCK Finals MVP – Summer 2015
- Two-time LCK Player of the Year – 2023, 2024
- Two-time LCK Mid Laner of the Year – 2023, 2024
- One-time LCK Most Improved Player – 2021
- One-time LCK Best Initiating Player – 2022
- Two-time OPGG Search King – 2023, 2024
- Two-time LCK First All-Pro Team – Spring 2022, Spring 2023
- Two-time LCK Second All-Pro Team – Summer 2022, Spring 2024
- Two-time LCK Third All-Pro Team – Spring 2020, LCK 2025 Season

=== South Korean national team ===
- Two-time Asian Games gold medal winner – 2022, 2026

=== KeSPA ===
- One-time KeSPA Cup champion – 2025
- One-time KeSPA League of Legends Mid Player Award – 2013
- Two-time KeSPA League of Legends Best Player – 2015, 2016
- Two-time KeSPA League of Legends Popularity Award – 2015, 2016
- Two-time KeSPA League of Legends eSports Award of the Year – 2015, 2016

=== Halls of Fame ===
- Six-time Korea Esports Hall of Fame Esports Star – 2018, 2019, 2020, 2022, 2023, 2024
- Esports Hall of Fame inductee – 2019
- LoL Esports Hall of Legends inaugural inductee – 2024

=== Media ===
- Forbes 30 Under 30 Asia Entertainment & Sports – 2019
- Forbes Korea Power Celebrity 40 – 2025
- Gold House Gold100 – 2026
- Time 100 Most Influential People in Sports – 2026
- Three-time The Game Awards Best Esports Athlete – 2017, 2023, 2024
- Two-time Esports Awards PC Player of the Year – 2023, 2024
- Esports Awards PC Player of the Decade – 2025
- Esports Awards EWC Player's Choice Award – 2026
- Team Razer Awards Player of the Year – 2025

=== National order ===
- Cheongnyong Medal of the Order of Sport Merit – 2026

== See also ==
- Chovy
- Ruler
- Bengi
- Perkz

== Notes ==
Awards and achievements
Preceded by Jang "MaRin" Gyeong-hwan; Choi "Zeus" Woo-je	League of Legends World Championship Finals MVP; 2016; 2024	Succeeded by Park "Ruler" Jae-hyuk; Lee "Gumayusi" Min-hyeong
Preceded by Ming "Clearlove" Kai	Mid-Season Invitational MVP; 2016	Succeeded by Lee "Wolf" Jae-wan
Preceded by Bae "dade" Eo-jin	League of Legends Champions Korea season MVP; Summer 2013 – Winter 2014	Succeeded by Bae "dade" Eo-jin
Preceded by Lee "Easyhoon" Ji-hoon	League of Legends Champions Korea Finals MVP; Summer 2015	Succeeded by Lee "Duke" Ho-seong
