= 2024 League of Legends World Championship =

14th competition of the League of Legends World Championship

Tournament information
- Sport: League of Legends
- Location: Germany; France; England
- Dates: 25 September–2 November
- Administrator: Riot Games
- Hosts: Berlin (Play-Ins & Swiss Stages); Paris (Quarterfinals & Semifinals); London (Final)
- Venue: 3 (in 3 host cities)
- Teams: 20

Final positions
- Champions: T1
- Runner-up: Bilibili Gaming

Tournament statistics
- Attendance: 14,700 (Finals)
- MVP: Lee "Faker" Sang-hyeok (T1)
- Highest KDA: Lee "Scout" Ye-chan (9.3) (LNG Esports)
- Highest Kills: Kim "Peyz" Soo-hwan (14) (Gen.G)

The 2024 League of Legends World Championship (German: League of Legends Weltmeisterschaft 2024; French: Le Championnat du Monde 2024 de League of Legends) was an esports tournament for the multiplayer online battle arena video game League of Legends. It was the fourteenth iteration of the League of Legends World Championship, an annual international tournament organised by the game's developer, Riot Games. The tournament was held from 25 September to 2 November in Berlin, Paris, and London. It marked the third time Germany and France hosted the event after the 2015 and 2019 editions, while it was the second World Championship to be held in England, United Kingdom since 2015. Twenty teams qualified for the event based on placement within their regional leagues and results gained in the 2024 Mid-Season Invitational (MSI).

The finals took place on 2 November at The O2 Arena in London, where T1 of the League of Legends Champions Korea (LCK) successfully defended their title after defeating Bilibili Gaming of the League of Legends Pro League (LPL) 3–2 to win the organization's record-extending fifth World Championship.

== Qualification ==
The League of Legends Champions Korea (LCK) and League of Legends Pro League (LPL) had three directly qualified teams to the Swiss stage, while the League of Legends EMEA Championship (LEC) and League Championship Series (LCS) had two directly qualified teams. The 2024 Mid-Season Invitational champion, Gen.G, earned automatic qualification to the Swiss stage, (Note: This qualification was activated when Gen.G qualified for the 2024 LCK Summer playoffs.) also counting as the additional seed for the LCK. The LPL, as the runner-up region, also earned an additional spot. Four teams from the play-in stage qualified to the Swiss stage.

Eight teams qualified for the play-in stage: The top two teams of the Pacific Championship Series (PCS) 2024 Summer playoffs, the top two teams of the Vietnam Championship Series (VCS) 2024 Summer playoffs, the third place teams in the LCS Championship and LEC Season Finals, the Campeonato Brasileiro de League of Legends (CBLOL) 2024 Split 2 champion, and the Liga Latinoamérica (LLA) 2024 Closing Split champion.

This was the final World Championship where teams from the PCS and VCS qualified for the tournament individually, as they merged (alongside the League of Legends Japan League (LJL) and League of Legends Circuit Oceania (LCO)) to form a new Asia-Pacific league in 2025 called League of Legends Championship Pacific (LCP). Additionally, the LCS, CBLOL and LLA merged under the newly formed League of Legends Championship of The Americas (LTA) for 2025, which had separated North (LTA North) and South (LTA South) Conferences. The LCS and CBLOL will return to the World Championship starting in 2026 after the LTA was discontinued following the 2025 season, however as of now this was the final World Championship where teams from the LLA qualified individually.

The following tables show qualified teams and their respective qualification paths:

Region	League	Qualification Path	Team	Pool
Started from Swiss Stage
South Korea	LCK	Summer Champion	Hanwha Life Esports	1
South Korea	LCK	Championship Points	Gen.G (Note: Gen.G automatically qualified for the tournament by winning the 2024 Mid-Season Invitational and qualifying for the 2024 LCK Summer Playoffs. Their pool is decided by placement in both LCK Summer Playoffs and Regional Championship Points)	2
South Korea	LCK	Regional Finals Winner	Dplus KIA	3
South Korea	LCK	Regional Finals Runner-Up	T1	3
China	LPL	Summer Champion	Bilibili Gaming	1
China	LPL	Championship Points	Top Esports	2
China	LPL	Regional Finals Winner	LNG Esports	3
China	LPL	Regional Finals Runner-Up	Weibo Gaming	3
EMEA	LEC	Season Finals Champion	G2 Esports (Note: G2 Esports automatically qualified for the tournament by winning the 2024 LEC Summer Split. As such, their slot for being the 2024 LEC Season Finals Champion was instead given to the third-place team in LEC 2024 Season Finals.)	1
EMEA	LEC	Season Finals Runner-Up	Fnatic	2
North America	LCS	Championship Winner	FlyQuest	1
North America	LCS	Championship Runner-Up	Team Liquid	2
Started from Play-in Stage
EMEA	LEC	Season Finals 3rd Place	MAD Lions KOI	1
North America	LCS	Championship 3rd Place	100 Thieves	1
Asia-Pacific	PCS	Summer Champion	PSG Talon	1
Asia-Pacific	PCS	Summer Runner-Up	SoftBank Hawks (Note: The team's official name is Fukuoka SoftBank Hawks Gaming, the esports division of Japanese baseball team Fukuoka SoftBank Hawks. SoftBank Hawks qualified for the PCS Summer Playoffs by winning the LJL 2024 Summer Split.)	2
Vietnam	VCS	Summer Champion	GAM Esports	1
Vietnam	VCS	Summer Runner-Up	Vikings Esports	2
Brazil	CBLOL	Split 2 Champion	PaiN Gaming	2
Latin America	LLA	Closing Champion	Movistar R7 (Note: The team's official name is Rainbow7 and is owned by Just Toys International. It competed with "Movistar R7" due to being sponsored by Movistar.)	2

=== Pre-tournament rankings ===
Riot Games unveiled its global power ranking ahead of the 2024 League of Legends World Championship. According to Riot Games, Gen.G ranked first with 1,663 points, and Bilibili Gaming ranked second with 1,602 points. Hanwha Life Esports, Top Esports, and G2 Esports followed. T1, the defending champion, was ranked sixth with 1,467 points. These pre-tournament rankings were known as Global Power Rankings and were powered by Amazon Web Services. These were based on an Elo model that evaluated the overall strength of the team. The goal was to ensure each ranking reflected how well a team would perform and the difficulty of the competition.

== Venues ==
Berlin, Paris, and London were chosen to host the competition. The O2 Arena was announced as the finals venue during the 2023 League of Legends World Championship final in Seoul, South Korea. The Riot Games Arena, and the Adidas Arena were announced as the venues for the play-in/Swiss stage and the quarterfinals/semifinals on 5 January 2024, respectively.

Berlin, Germany	Paris, France	London, England
Play-in and Swiss Stage	Quarterfinals and Semifinals	Final
Riot Games Arena	Adidas Arena	The O2 Arena
Capacity: 210	Capacity: 9,000	Capacity: 20,000
2024 League of Legends World Championship is located in Germany	2024 League of Legends World Championship is located in France	2024 League of Legends World Championship is located in England

== Play-in stage ==
The play-in stage was held from 25 to 29 September at the Riot Games Arena in Berlin. Eight teams were placed into a double-elimination bracket, with Pool 1 teams facing Pool 2 teams in the opening matches. No two teams from the same region were placed in the same half of the bracket. All matches were contested as best-of-three series. Four teams advanced to the Swiss stage as Pool 4, while the remaining teams were eliminated.

Opening Matches
Match 1
MAD Lions KOI	2
Vikings Esports	0
Match 2
PSG Talon	2
PaiN Gaming	1
Match 3
GAM Esports	2
SoftBank Hawks	0
Match 4
100 Thieves	1
Movistar R7	2
Elimination Matches
Match 5
L1	Vikings Esports	0
L2	PaiN Gaming	2
Match 6
L3	SoftBank Hawks	0
L4	100 Thieves	2

Winner's Match
Match 7
W1	MAD Lions KOI	2
W2	PSG Talon	1
Match 8
W3	GAM Esports	2
W4	Movistar R7	0
Decider Matches
Match 9
L8	Movistar R7	1
W5	PaiN Gaming	2
Match 10
L7	PSG Talon	2
W6	100 Thieves	0

Advance to Swiss stage
MAD Lions KOI
GAM Esports
Advance to Swiss stage
PaiN Gaming
PSG Talon

Source: LoL Esports

== Swiss stage ==
The Swiss stage was held from 3 to 7 and 10 to 13 October at the Riot Games Arena in Berlin, with matches starting at 14:00 CEST (UTC+2). Sixteen teams competed in a Swiss-system format over five rounds. In the first round, Pool 1 teams faced Pool 4 teams, while Pool 2 teams faced Pool 3 teams, with teams from the same region not playing against each other. From the second round onward, teams with identical records played each other, with matchups determined by draw after each round. Teams from the same region could face each other, and for the first time, no team was placed in a rematch against a previous opponent. Teams that achieved three wins advanced to the knockout stage, while those with three losses were eliminated. All advancement and elimination matches were contested as best-of-three, while all other matches were best-of-one.

=== Bracket ===
Advance to knockouts
2–0	LNG Esports
1–0	Hanwha Life Esports	1	Gen.G
0–0	G2 Esports	0	Gen.G	2	Advance to knockouts
Hanwha Life Esports	1	Hanwha Life Esports	1	Dplus KIA	0	2–1	T1
PSG Talon	0	Dplus KIA	1	LNG Esports	2	Dplus KIA	0	Top Esports
FlyQuest	1	FlyQuest	0	Top Esports	2	Hanwha Life Esports
GAM Esports	0	Gen.G	1	1–1	G2 Esports	0	Advance to knockouts
G2 Esports	1	Top Esports	0	Bilibili Gaming	0	T1	2	2–2	Bilibili Gaming
PaiN Gaming	0	Bilibili Gaming	0	T1	1	Hanwha Life Esports	2	Dplus KIA	1	Weibo Gaming
Bilibili Gaming	1	LNG Esports	1	PSG Talon	0	FlyQuest	1	Weibo Gaming	2	FlyQuest
MAD Lions KOI	0	FlyQuest	1	FlyQuest	2
Top Esports	1	0–1	Top Esports	1	1–2	Team Liquid	1	Eliminated
T1	0	T1	1	Fnatic	0	Team Liquid	2	G2 Esports	1	G2 Esports
Team Liquid	0	PaiN Gaming	0	Weibo Gaming	0	GAM Esports	1	Bilibili Gaming	2	Dplus KIA
LNG Esports	1	PSG Talon	1	G2 Esports	1	Weibo Gaming	2	Team Liquid
Fnatic	0	MAD Lions KOI	0	Fnatic	1	Eliminated
Dplus KIA	1	Weibo Gaming	1	0–2	Bilibili Gaming	2	Fnatic
Gen.G	1	Team Liquid	0	PaiN Gaming	0	PSG Talon	0	GAM Esports
Weibo Gaming	0	Fnatic	1	Team Liquid	2	PSG Talon
GAM Esports	0	MAD Lions KOI	1	Eliminated
GAM Esports	2	MAD Lions KOI
PaiN Gaming

Source: LoL Esports

== Knockout stage ==
The knockout stage took place from 17 to 20 and 26 to 27 October, and on 2 November, with matches starting at 14:00 CEST (UTC+2). Eight teams that advanced from the Swiss stage were drawn into a single-elimination bracket. The two teams that finished the Swiss stage with a 3–0 record were placed on opposite sides of the bracket and faced teams with a 3–2 record in the quarterfinals, while all remaining teams were seeded randomly. The quarterfinals and semifinals were held at the Adidas Arena in Paris, and the finals took place at the O2 Arena in London. All matches were contested as best-of-five series. The members of the winning team lifted the Summoner's Cup, earning the title of 2024 League of Legends World Champions.

=== Qualified teams ===
Eight teams qualify for the playoff portion of the tournament from the Swiss stage.

Pools	Teams
Pool 1 (3–0)	LNG Esports
Pool 1 (3–0)	Gen.G
Pool 2 (3–1)	Top Esports
Pool 2 (3–1)	Hanwha Life Esports
Pool 2 (3–1)	T1
Pool 3 (3–2)	Weibo Gaming
Pool 3 (3–2)	Bilibili Gaming
Pool 3 (3–2)	FlyQuest

=== Bracket ===
Quarterfinals
17 October, 14:00 CEST – Paris
LNG Esports	1
Weibo Gaming	3
18 October, 14:00 CEST – Paris
Hanwha Life Esports	1
Bilibili Gaming	3
19 October, 14:00 CEST – Paris
Top Esports	0
T1	3
20 October, 14:00 CEST – Paris
Gen.G	3
FlyQuest	2

Semifinals
26 October, 14:00 CEST – Paris
Weibo Gaming	0
Bilibili Gaming	3
27 October, 14:00 CET – Paris
T1	3
Gen.G	1

Final
2 November, 15:00 CET – London
Bilibili Gaming	2
T1	3

Source: LoL Esports

== Ranking ==
A base prize pool of US$2,250,000 was offered for the tournament. This pool was to be further increased based on sales of an event pass within the League of Legends store. The prize pool was spread among the teams as seen below:

Place	Team	PI	SS	QF	SF	Finals	Prize (%)	Prize (USD)
1st	T1	–	3–1	3–0	3–1	3–2	20%	$450,000
2nd	Bilibili Gaming	–	3–2	3–1	3–0	2–3	16%	$360,000
3rd–4th	Gen.G	–	3–0	3–2	1–3		8%	$180,000
3rd–4th	Weibo Gaming	–	3–2	3–1	0–3		8%	$180,000
5th–8th	LNG Esports	–	3–0	1–3			4.5%	$101,250
5th–8th	Hanwha Life Esports	–	3–1	1–3			4.5%	$101,250
5th–8th	FlyQuest	–	3–2	2–3			4.5%	$101,250
5th–8th	Top Esports	–	3–1	0–3			4.5%	$101,250
9th–11th	G2 Esports	–	2–3				3.5%	$78,750
9th–11th	Dplus KIA	–	2–3				3.5%	$78,750
9th–11th	Team Liquid	–	2–3				3.5%	$78,750
12th–14th	Fnatic	–	1–3				3%	$67,500
12th–14th	GAM Esports	2–0	1–3				3%	$67,500
12th–14th	PSG Talon	2–1	1–3				3%	$67,500
15th–16th	MAD Lions KOI	2–0	0–3				2.5%	$56,250
15th–16th	PaiN Gaming	2–1	0–3				2.5%	$56,250
17th–18th	Movistar R7	1–2					1.75%	$39,375
17th–18th	100 Thieves	1–2					1.75%	$39,375
19th–20th	SoftBank Hawks	0–2					1%	$22,500
19th–20th	Viking Esports	0–2					1%	$22,500
Place	Team	PI	SS	QF	SF	Finals	Prize (%)	Prize (USD)

== Marketing ==
=== Official song ===
"Heavy Is the Crown", performed by Linkin Park, was announced as the tournament's theme song on 24 September 2024. A day later, Riot Games and Linkin Park released the song's music video, featuring the most recent champions T1 of the LCK, consisting of reigning Finals MVP Choi "Zeus" Woo-je, Mun "Oner" Hyeon-jun, Lee "Faker" Sang-hyeok, Lee "Gumayusi" Min-hyeong, and Ryu "Keria" Min-seok. The video also featured players from the winners of major professional regions during the Spring and Summer Splits, such as Gen.G's Jeong "Chovy" Ji-hoon of the LCK, Bilibili Gaming's Chen "Bin" Zebin of the LPL, G2 Esports's Rasmus "Caps" Winther of the LEC, and FlyQuest's Fahad "Massu" Abdulmalek of the LCS. Diego "Brance" Amaral of the CBLOL's Red Canids was also included, despite the team not qualifying for the tournament.

Despite being on tour for their at-the-time upcoming album From Zero, Linkin Park performed the song as part of the opening ceremony for the final between Bilibili Gaming and T1. They previously performed at the O2 Arena for their album tour, during which they performed the same track.

=== Slogan ===
The tournament's official slogan, Make Them Believe, was unveiled on 31 August 2024 alongside a format explainer video on YouTube.

== Sponsorship ==
Riot Games Esports Partners	LoL Esports Partners
HP Omen; Amazon Web Services; Verizon; Secretlab; Mastercard; HyperX; Red Bull	Opera GX; Mercedes-Benz; Oppo; Cisco
