= Zeus (gamer) =

South Korean esports player (born 2004)

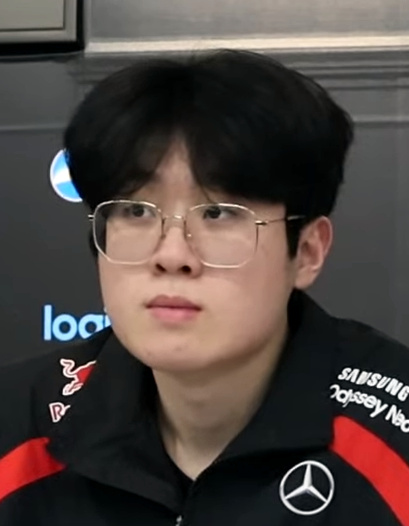
- Zeus in 2024

Personal information
- Name: 최우제 (Choi Woo-je)
- Nickname: God of Thunder
- Born: January 31, 2004 (age 22)

Current team
- Team: Unspecified
- Role: Top
- Game: League of Legends
- League: LCK

Career information
- Playing career: 2019–present

Team history
- 2019–2020: T1 Academy
- 2021–2024: T1
- 2025–2026: Hanwha Life Esports

Career highlights and awards
- 2× World champion (2023, 2024); Worlds Finals MVP (2023); MSI champion (2026); MSI Finals MVP (2026); First Stand champion (2025); Esports World Cup champion (2024); LCK champion; 3× LCK Top Laner of the Year; 4× LCK First All-Pro Team; LCK Second All-Pro Team; LCK Third All-Pro Team; LCK Cup champion; LCK Cup Finals MVP
Medal record
Esports
Representing South Korea
Asian Games
Gold medal – first place	2026 Aichi-Nagoya	League of Legends
Gold medal – first place	2022 Hangzhou	League of Legends

Choi Woo-je (Korean: 최우제; born January 31, 2004), better known as Zeus (Note: Korean: 제우스, pronounced "Je-woo-s"), is a South Korean professional League of Legends player currently playing for Hanwha Life Esports. Throughout his career, he has won one League of Legends Champions Korea (LCK) title, two League of Legends World Championship titles, one Mid-Season Invitational (MSI) title and one First Stand title. He also represented the South Korean national team at the Asian Games, earning two gold medals in 2022 and 2026.

Zeus began his career in 2019 as a member of T1 Academy, the developmental team of T1. He was promoted to the main roster for the 2021 LCK season. While he received some playing time in the 2021 Spring Split, Zeus did not become the main starter for the team until 2022. Since then, Zeus reached LCK Finals five times, winning once in the 2022 Spring Split. He reached the finals of the World Championship in his first year as a starter, and the following two years, he won the 2023 and 2024 World Championships. In 2024, Zeus left T1 to join Hanwha Life.

Zeus's individual accomplishments include accolades such as a World Championship Finals MVP award, two LCK Top Laner of the Year awards, and three LCK First All-Pro Team designations.

== Professional career ==
In 2019, Zeus was signed to T1 Academy, the developmental team of T1. On November 26, 2020, T1 promoted Zeus to its main roster, replacing Kim "Roach" Kang-hee, who was sent to the academy team. After turning 17 on January 31, 2021, he made his LCK debut on February 3 in a win over Nongshim RedForce in the 2021 LCK Spring Split regular season, replacing Kim "Canna" Chang-dong in the starting lineup. He split time with Canna throughout the split, competing for the starting position. In the regular season, Zeus played a total of 19 games, totaling 12 wins and seven losses with a KDA average of 3.11, with his final match being in March against KT Rolster. Zeus lost the starting position to Canna, and did not play throughout the rest of the year.

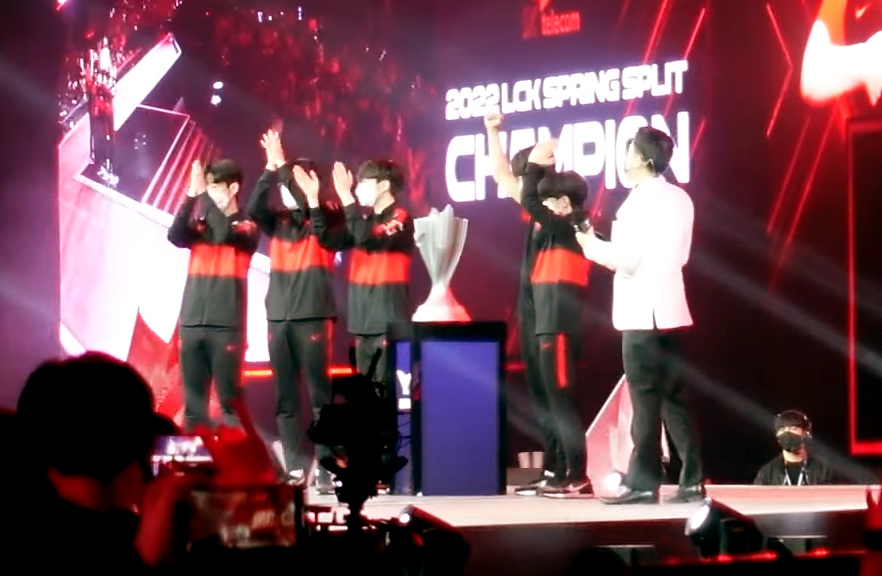
Zeus winning his 1st LCK title

Heading into the 2022 LCK Spring Split regular season, Canna transferred to Nongshim RedForce, and Zeus became the team's starting top laner. T1 went undefeated with an 18–0 record, marking the first time in LCK history that a team had gone undefeated. Zeus recorded 36 wins and seven losses. He had the most kills and the highest KDA average of 3.64 throughout the regular season among all top laners in the LCK and secured a spot on the 2022 LCK Spring First All-Pro team. In the playoffs, T1 advanced to the 2022 LCK Spring Finals, where they faced Gen.G on April 2. Throughout the match, Zeus pressured Choi "Doran" Hyun-jun in the laning phase. In particular, in game four, Zeus neutralized Doran by using his Flash and Lightning Rush abilities in response to a gank with Oner to take the lead. With Doran falling early in the game, Gen.G's composition lost strength from the early stages, and T1 went on to win the game. With a final score of 3–1, T1 won the final, marking Zeus's first LCK championship. With the Spring Split title, Zeus participated in his inaugural Mid-Season Invitational (MSI) as T1 qualified for the 2022 MSI as the LCK representative. Zeus had the second-most damage among all top laners in the MSI. Although the team reached the finals, they lost Royal Never Give Up, securing a second-place finish. On June 14, T1 announced that Zeus had signed a one-year extension with the team. In the 2022 LCK Summer Split regular season, Zeus was named to the LCK First All-Pro Team. In the playoffs, T1 lost to Gen.G in the finals, finishing the split in second place.

T1 entered the 2022 World Championship as the LCK's second seed. In the group stage, T1 and Edward Gaming were both in the running to take the top seed in their group. T1 took the leading position in the group after defeating Edward Gaming on October 14, with Zeus being named the MVP of the game, and finished the group stage with a 5–1 record to advance to the knockout quarterfinals. Zeus reached the Worlds finals for the first time in his career after T1 defeated JD Gaming in the semifinals. However, T1 lost to DRX in the finals by a score of 2–3. At the 2022 LCK Awards ceremony, Zeus was named the LCK Top Laner of the Year.

In the 2023 LCK Spring Split, T1 finished the regular season in first place with a 17–1 record, and alongside the entire starting T1 roster, Zeus was named to the 2023 LCK Spring First All-Pro Team. Despite their regular season performance, T1 reached the Spring Split playoff finals but once again fell short against Gen.G, finishing in second place. With the second-place finish, T1 qualified for the 2023 Mid-Season Invitational. At MSI, T1 reached the upper bracket finals but faced defeat against JD Gaming, sending them to the lower bracket finals, where they lost to Bilibili Gaming by a score of 1–3. In July 2023, during the 2023 LCK Summer Split, T1 encountered challenges as mid laner Lee "Faker" Sang-hyeok was sidelined due to a wrist injury. Zeus's, as well as the entire team's, performance dipped during this period. Upon Faker's return, T1 won their final two matches, concluding the regular season in fifth place with a 9–9 record. On August 20, 2023, Zeus made his fifth LCK finals appearance, but T1 faced another defeat against Gen.G in the finals.

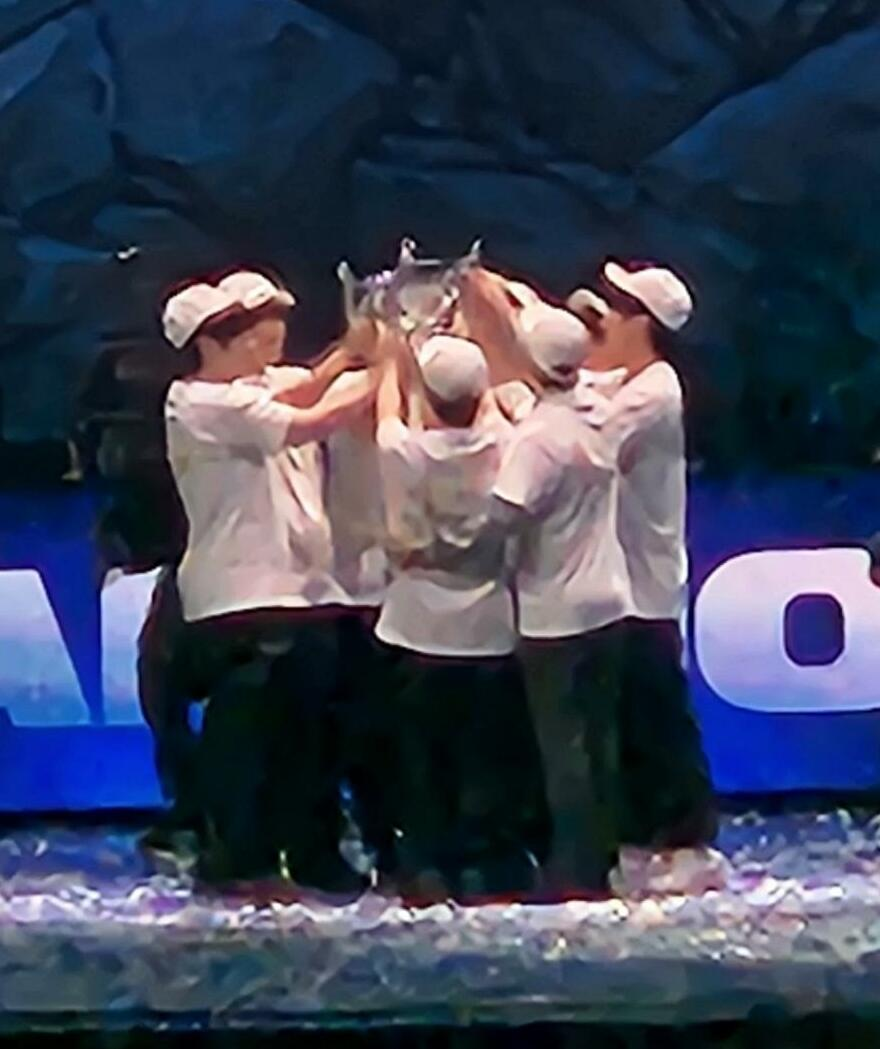
Zeus celebrating after winning the 2023 World Championship

T1 entered the 2023 World Championship as the LCK's second seed. Zeus reached his second consecutive appearance in the Worlds finals after T1 secured a victory over JD Gaming in the semifinals. In the finals against Weibo Gaming, the first game saw both teams evenly matched until the 18-minute mark, when Keria executed a move called "Hostile Takeover". The play allowed Zeus and Faker to secure kills that enabling T1 to establish a significant lead and ultimately secure the victory in the game. T1 went on to win the following two games as well, resulting in a 3–0 victory and giving Zeus his first World Championship title. Zeus was also named the MVP of the Finals. On November 23, 2023, T1 announced that Zeus had re-signed with the team. At the 2023 LCK Awards ceremony, Zeus received his second consecutive Top Laner of the Year award.

On November 19, 2024, Zeus parted ways with T1. The next day, he was announced as the newest member of Hanwha Life Esports.

== National team career ==
Zeus represented South Korea in the 2022 Asian Games one of the six members in the League of Legends division of the South Korea national esports team. Zeus clinched a gold medal as South Korea emerged victorious against Saudi Arabia, China, and Chinese Taipei in the quarterfinals, semifinals, and finals, respectively. With the gold medal, Zeus received an exemption from mandatory military service.

== Seasons overview ==
Year	Team	Domestic					International		
Year	Team	League	Split				First Stand	Mid-Season Invitational	World Championship
Year	Team	League	Cup	Spring	Summer	Season Playoffs	First Stand	Mid-Season Invitational	World Championship
2021	T1	LCK	—N/a	4th	2nd (Note: Subtitute)	—N/a	—N/a	Did not qualify	—
2022	T1	LCK	—N/a	1st	2nd	—N/a	—N/a	2nd	2nd
2023	T1	LCK	—N/a	2nd	2nd	—N/a	—N/a	3rd	1st
2024	T1	LCK	—N/a	2nd	3rd	—N/a	—N/a	3rd	1st
2025	Hanwha Life Esports	LCK	1st	—N/a	—N/a	2nd	1st	Did not qualify	5th–8th
2026	Hanwha Life Esports	LCK	10th	—N/a	—N/a	2nd	Did not qualify	1st	9th–11th

== Awards and honors ==
International

- Two-time Worlds champion – 2023, 2024
  - One-time Worlds Finals MVP – 2023
- One-time Mid-Season Invitational champion – 2026
  - One-time Mid-Season Invitational Finals MVP – 2026
- One-time First Stand champion – 2025
- One-time Esports World Cup champion – 2024

LCK

- One-time LCK champion – Spring 2022
- One-time LCK Cup champion – 2025
  - One-time LCK Cup Finals MVP – 2025
- Three-time Top-laner of the Year – 2022, 2023, 2024
- Four-time LCK All-Pro 1st Team – Spring 2022, Summer 2022, Spring 2023, 2026 Season
- One-time LCK All-Pro 2nd Team – Spring 2024
- One-time LCK All-Pro 3rd Team – Summer 2023

South Korea Esports

- Two-time Asian Games gold medal winner – 2022, 2026

== Personal life ==
Zeus was born on January 31, 2004. In his youth, he and his family watched esports matches such as KartRider and League of Legends on the Korean esports channel OGN. He and his brother began playing League of Legends not because they enjoyed the game, but because they wanted to understand what was happening in professional matches. In 2018, his interest in League of Legends esport grew more, becoming a fan of SK Telecom T1. That same year, he reached the number one rank of the Korean solo queue ladder.
