= Esports at the 2026 Asian Games – League of Legends =

League of Legends at the 2026 Asian Games
- Dates: 29 September – 2 October 2026
- Competitors: 48 from 8 nations

Medalists
gold medal	South Korea
silver medal	Chinese Taipei
bronze medal	Saudi Arabia
bronze medal	Vietnam

The League of Legends tournament at the 2026 Asian Games was held at the Aichi Sky Expo in Tokoname, Aichi Prefecture, Japan, from 29 September to 2 October 2026.

South Korea won the gold medal, defeating Chinese Taipei 3–0 in the final, defending the title they had won in 2022 and finishing the tournament undefeated.

== Qualification ==
The qualification tournament was held in Kuala Lumpur, Malaysia, from 12 to 14 June 2026. Fourteen teams were drawn into four groups and competed for six berths in the main tournament, joining South Korea and Chinese Taipei, the gold and silver medalists from the 2022 Asian Games, who had secured direct qualification.

== Format ==
Eight teams took part in the tournament. They were drawn into two groups of four and played a single round-robin within their group, with the top two teams from each group advancing to the knockout stage. The knockout stage was a single-elimination bracket contested by four teams. Group stage matches were played as best-of-one, the semifinals as best-of-three, and the final as best-of-five.

== Rosters ==
Hong Kong	India	South Korea	Saudi Arabia
Chau Shu Tak; Leung Ka Kit; Li Sau Nam; Ling Kai Wing; Ng Cheuk Lun Jason; Tsang Tak Lam	Ahmed Shahid Israr; Rahul Bisht; Sanindhya Malik; Mihir Ranjan; Aakash Shandilya; Akshaj Shenoy	Choi Woo-je; Kim Geon-woo; Kim Geon-bu; Lee Min-hyung; Lee Sang-hyeok; Ryu Min-seok	Nawaf Al-Juaid; Nawaf Al-Khowaiter; Abdolaziz Al-Mubarak; Khalid Al-Zahrani; Sahal Waggass; Ajwad Wazzan
Malaysia	Chinese Taipei	United Arab Emirates	Vietnam
Ang Jing En; Khairul Amirin Kamarulnizam; Lim Alvin Ming Siang; Lim Yew Siang; Sia Eric Sze Pin; Soh Jireh	Chen Yi-chin; Chiu Tzu-chuan; Lin Yu-en; Liu Jia-hao; Tsai Ming-hung; Yu Jun-jia	Harib Al-Mentheri; Khalifa Al-Dhaheri; Butti Al-Mansoori; Mohammed Al-Matrooshi; Fares Al-Mazrouei; Ahmed Al-Suwaidi	Đinh Anh Tài; Hoàng Công Nghĩa; Lê Văn Hoàng Hải; Nguyễn Đăng Khoa; Trần Duy Đức; Trần Duy Sang

== Group stage ==
=== Group A ===
Pos	Team	Pld	W	L	GF	GA	GD	Qualification
1	Vietnam	3	3	0	3	0	+3	Advance to knockout stage
2	Saudi Arabia	3	2	1	2	1	+1	Advance to knockout stage
3	United Arab Emirates	3	1	2	1	2	−1	
4	Malaysia	3	0	3	0	3	−3	

Source: Asian Games 2026

Date	Time		Score		Game 1
29 September	9:00	Saudi Arabia	0–1	Vietnam	0–1
29 September	9:00	United Arab Emirates	1–0	Malaysia	1–0
29 September	11:30	Saudi Arabia	1–0	United Arab Emirates	1–0
29 September	11:30	Vietnam	1–0	Malaysia	1–0
29 September	14:00	Saudi Arabia	1–0	Malaysia	1–0
29 September	14:00	Vietnam	1–0	United Arab Emirates	1–0

=== Group B ===
Pos	Team	Pld	W	L	GF	GA	GD	Qualification
1	South Korea	3	3	0	3	0	+3	Advance to knockout stage
2	Chinese Taipei	3	2	1	2	1	+1	Advance to knockout stage
3	Hong Kong	3	1	2	1	2	−1	
4	India	3	0	3	0	3	−3	

Source: Asian Games 2026

Date	Time		Score		Game 1
30 September	9:00	India	0–1	Hong Kong	0–1
30 September	9:00	South Korea	1–0	Chinese Taipei	1–0
30 September	11:30	India	0–1	South Korea	0–1
30 September	11:30	Hong Kong	0–1	Chinese Taipei	0–1
30 September	14:00	India	0–1	Chinese Taipei	0–1
30 September	14:00	Hong Kong	0–1	South Korea	0–1

== Knockout stage ==
Semifinals
A1	Vietnam	0
B2	Chinese Taipei	2
B1	South Korea	2
A2	Saudi Arabia	0

Finals
B2	Chinese Taipei	0
B1	South Korea	3

=== Semifinals ===
Date	Time		Score		Game 1	Game 2	Game 3
1 October	9:00	Vietnam	0–2	Chinese Taipei	0–1	0–1	—N/a
1 October	13:30	South Korea	2–0	Saudi Arabia	1–0	1–0	—N/a

=== Final ===
Date	Time		Score		Game 1	Game 2	Game 3	Game 4	Game 5
2 October	12:00	Chinese Taipei	0–3	South Korea	0–1	0–1	0–1	—N/a	

== External Link ==
- Results Book
