= The Dreamer (TV series) =

- Genre: Entertainment
- Starring: Kim Hee-chul; Park So-hyeon
- Country of origin: South Korea
- Original language: Korean
- No. of episodes: 1

Production
- Running time: 60 minutes

Original release
- Network: KBS2
- Release: January 20, 2020

The Dreamer (Korean: 더 드리머) is a variety show program that aired by KBS2 that talks about esports with popular esports players.

== Broadcast time ==
Broadcast channel	Broadcast period	Airtime
KBS2	January 20, 2020	Monday 23:40 – 00:40

== Performer ==
=== Host ===
- Kim Hee-chul
- Park So-hyeon (Announcer)

=== Appearance ===
- Jeon Yong-joon
- Lee Hyunwoo
- Faker
- Moon Ho Joon

== Viewership ratings ==
Round	Broadcast	AGB ratings
Round	Broadcast	South Korea (nationwide)
1	January 20, 2020	1.2%
