= 2016 Mid-Season Invitational =

League of Legends tournament

Tournament information
- Sport: League of Legends
- Location: China
- Dates: 4 May–15 May
- Administrator: Riot Games
- Venue(s): Shanghai Oriental Sports Center (Pudong New Area, Shanghai)
- Teams: 6

Final positions
- Champions: SK Telecom T1
- Runner-up: Counter Logic Gaming
- MVP: Lee "Faker" Sang-hyeok (SK Telecom T1)

The 2016 Mid-Season Invitational was the second event of the Mid-Season Invitational (MSI), a League of Legends tournament by Riot Games. It took place from March 4 to March 15, 2016, in Shanghai Oriental Sports Center, Pudong, Shanghai, China. The participants were 6 winning teams of the Spring Seasons in their respective regions: 5 teams from North America (NA LCS), Europe (EU LCS), China (LPL), South Korea (LCK), Taiwan/Hong Kong/Macau (LMS) and a team from Wildcard regions (Brazil, CIS, Japan, Latin America, Oceania, Southeast Asia) that won the Mid-Season International Wildcard Invitational (IWCI).

SK Telecom T1 from South Korea won their first MSI title after defeating Counter Logic Gaming from North America 3–0 in the final.

== Qualified teams ==
| Region | League | Path | Team |
Starting in the bracket stage
| China | LPL | Spring champion | Royal Never Give Up |
| South Korea | LCK | Spring champion | SK Telecom T1 |
| Europe | EU LCS | Spring champion | G2 Esports |
| North America | NA LCS | Spring champion | Counter Logic Gaming |
| TW/HK/MO | LMS | Spring champion | Flash Wolves |
| Turkey | TCL | IWCI winner | SuperMassive eSports |

== Venue ==
Shanghai was the city chosen to host the competition.

Shanghai, China
Shanghai Oriental Sports Center
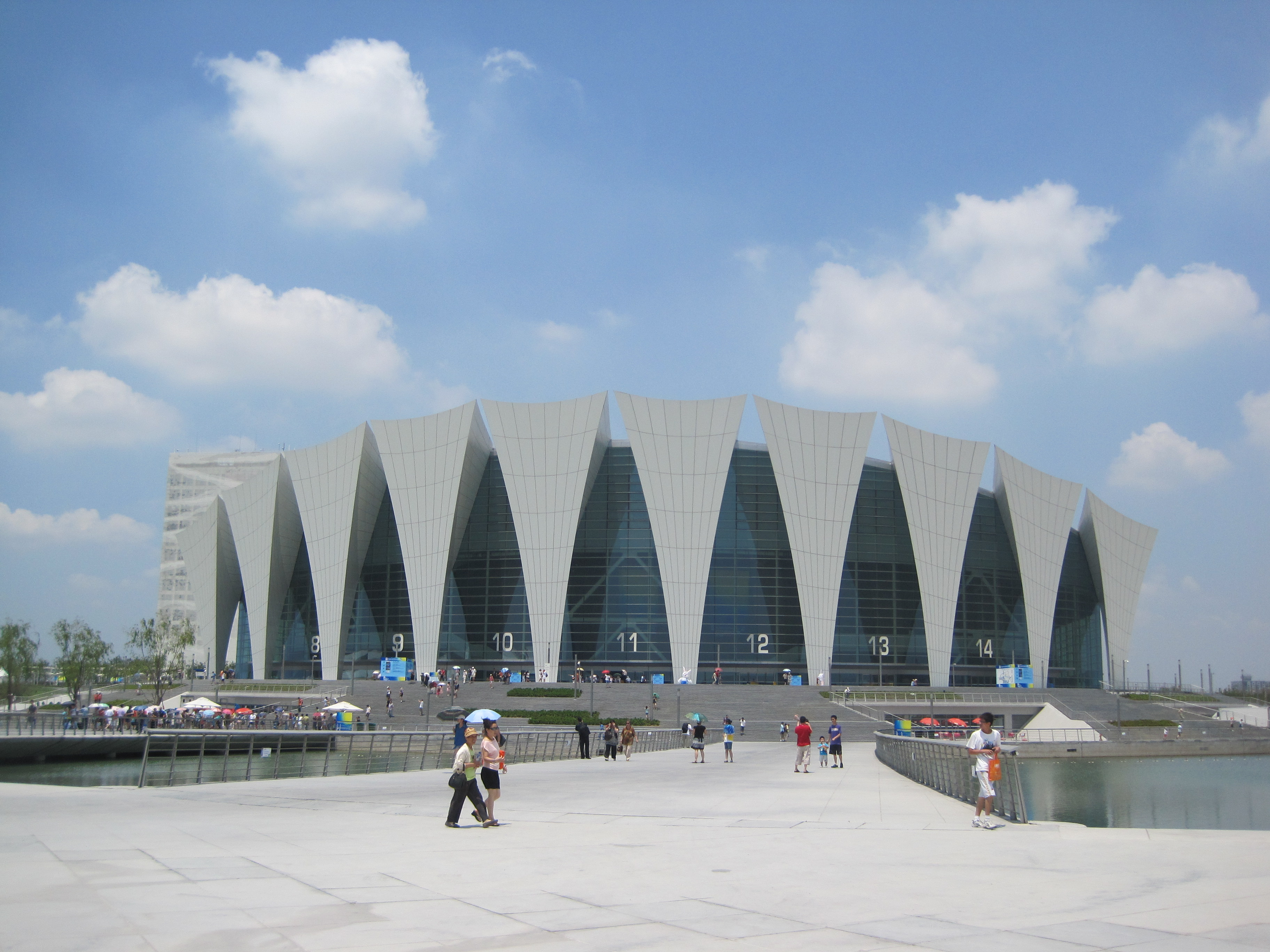

== Group stage ==
- Double Round Robin, all matches are Best-of-one.
- Top 4 teams advance to Play-off. Bottom 2 teams are eliminated.

| Pos | Team | Pld | W | L | PCT | Qualification |
|---|---|---|---|---|---|---|
| 1 | Royal Never Give Up | 10 | 8 | 2 | 0.800 | Advance to Knockout Stage |
| 2 | Counter Logic Gaming | 10 | 7 | 3 | 0.700 | Advance to Knockout Stage |
| 3 | Flash Wolves | 10 | 6 | 4 | 0.600 | Advance to Knockout Stage |
| 3 | SK Telecom T1 | 10 | 6 | 4 | 0.600 | Advance to Knockout Stage |
| 5 | G2 Esports | 10 | 2 | 8 | 0.200 | |
| 6 | SuperMassive eSports | 10 | 1 | 9 | 0.100 | |

Source: LoL Esports (Archived 2017-05-21 at the Wayback Machine)

== Knockout stage ==
- The 1st-place team plays with the 4th-place team, The 2nd-place team plays with the 3rd-place team in semifinals.
- Matches are Best-of-five

Semifinals
1 | Royal Never Give Up | 1
4 | SK Telecom T1 | 3
3 | Flash Wolves | 1
2 | Counter Logic Gaming | 3

Final
SK Telecom T1 | 3
Counter Logic Gaming | 0

== Final standings ==
| Place | Team | Prize money |
|---|---|---|
| 1st | SK Telecom T1 | $250,000 |
| 2nd | Counter Logic Gaming | $100,000 |
| 3rd–4th | Flash Wolves | $50,000 |
| 3rd–4th | Royal Never Give Up | $50,000 |
| 5th–6th | G2 Esports | |
| 5th–6th | SuperMassive eSports | |
