= 2020 LCK season =

Ninth season of South Korea's League of Legends Champions Korea

- League: LCK
- Sport: League of Legends
- Duration: 5 February – 25 April (Spring); 17 June – 5 September (Summer)
- Teams: 10

Spring
- Season champions: T1
- Runners-up: Gen.G
- Top seed: Gen.G
- Season MVP: Gwak "Bdd" Bo-seong (Gen.G)

Summer
- Season champions: DAMWON Gaming
- Runners-up: DRX
- Top seed: DAMWON Gaming
- Season MVP: Heo "ShowMaker" Su (DAMWON Gaming)

LCK seasons
- ← 2019 2021 →

The 2020 LCK season was the ninth year of South Korea's LCK, a professional esports league for the MOBA PC game League of Legends.

The spring split began on 5 February and was scheduled to end with the spring finals on 13 April; however, the regular season was suspended for two weeks due to the COVID-19 pandemic in South Korea, and the split instead concluded on 25 April.

The summer split began on 17 June and concluded with the summer finals on 5 September.

== Spring ==
=== Promotion ===
Round 1
LCK	Hanwha Life Esports	1
CK	APK Prince	2
Winner's bracket
LCK	Jin Air Green Wings	2
CK	Team Dynamics	0
L1	Hanwha Life Esports	3
L2	Team Dynamics	1
Loser's bracket

Qualifying matches
W1	APK Prince	3
W2	Jin Air Green Wings	1
L3	Jin Air Green Wings	0
W3	Hanwha Life Esports	3

=== Regular season ===
Pos	Team	W	L	Pts	Qualification
1	Gen.G	14	4	10	Advance to Finals
2	T1	14	4	10	Advance to Playoffs Round 2
3	DragonX	14	4	10	Advance to Playoffs Round 1
4	KT Rolster	10	8	2	Advance to Wild Card
5	DAMWON Gaming	9	9	0	Advance to Wild Card
6	Afreeca Freecs	7	11	−4	
7	APK Prince	6	12	−6	
8	Hanwha Life Esports	6	12	−6	
9	SANDBOX Gaming	5	13	−8	Drop to promotion tournament
10	Griffin	5	13	−8	Drop to promotion tournament

=== Playoffs ===
Wild Card
4	KT Rolster	1
5	DAMWON Gaming	2

Playoffs Round 1
3	DragonX	3
5	DAMWON Gaming	2

Playoffs Round 2
2	T1	3
3	DragonX	1

Finals
1	Gen.G	0
2	T1	3

== Summer ==
=== Promotion ===
Round 1
LCK	SANDBOX Gaming	0
CK	Team Dynamics	2
Winner's bracket
LCK	Griffin	1
CK	Seorabeol Gaming	2
L1	SANDBOX Gaming	2
L2	Griffin	0
Loser's bracket

Qualifying matches
W1	Team Dynamics	2
W2	Seorabeol Gaming	0
L3	Seorabeol Gaming	0
W3	SANDBOX Gaming	3

=== Regular season ===
Pos	Team	W	L	Pts	Qualification
1	DAMWON Gaming	16	2	14	Advance to Finals
2	DRX	15	3	12	Advance to Playoffs Round 2
3	Gen.G	14	4	10	Advance to Playoffs Round 1
4	T1	13	5	8	Advance to Wild Card
5	Afreeca Freecs	10	8	2	Advance to Wild Card
6	KT Rolster	7	11	−4	
7	SANDBOX Gaming	7	11	−4	
8	Team Dynamics	5	13	−8	
9	Hanwha Life Esports	2	16	−14	
10	SeolHaeOne Prince	1	17	−16	

=== Playoffs ===
Wild Card
4	T1	1
5	Afreeca Freecs	2

Playoffs Round 1
3	Gen.G	3
5	Afreeca Freecs	0

Playoffs Round 2
2	DRX	3
3	Gen.G	2

Finals
1	DAMWON Gaming	3
2	DRX	0
