= South Korea national esports team =

South Korea
- Full name: South Korea national esports team
- Nicknames: Team Korea
- Sport: Esports
- National association: Korea e-Sports Association

The South Korea national esports team represents South Korea in international esports tournaments. It is organized under the Korea e-Sports Association.

== History ==
South Korea has been known for its significant role in esports. The country has been hosting amateur esports tournaments as early as the late 1990s. In 1999, Korea e-Sports Association (KeSPA) would be established. South Korea would host the first World Cyber Games.

The KeSPA would become a semi-member of the Korean Sport & Olympic Committee (KSOC) at a undetermined date until August 2017, when it failed to meet tighter membership standards introduced in December 2015.

At the 2018 Asian Games in Jakarta and Palembang, esports would be held as a demonstration event. South Korea looked to join the event but their non-membership with the KSOC at the time became an obstacle. KeSPA was able to regain semi-membership after Daejeon recognized the organization as a sporting affiliate. They were able to send a delegation to the games.

Esports would become a regular event at the 2022 Asian Games which was held in Hangzhou. South Korea sent an esports delegation once again. Now that esports is an official medal event, this also meant that Korean players would get exemption from military service if they clinch a gold medal at the games.

== Titles ==
The South Korean esports team has fielded teams and/or players for the following titles.

- EA Sports FC Online – 2022 Asiad
- League of Legends – 2018 Asiad*, 2022 Asiad
- PUBG Mobile / Peacekeeper Elite – 2022 Asiad
- StarCraft II – 2018 Asiad*

(*) Demonstration event

== Current roster ==
South Korea national esports team – 2022 Asian Games roster
Players
Coaches

Name	Game	Team
Kwak Jun-hyuk	EA Sports FC Online	—
Park Ki-young	EA Sports FC Online	—
Choi Woo-je	League of Legends	(South Korea) T1
Seo Jin-hyeok	League of Legends	(China) JD Gaming
Lee Sang-hyeok	League of Legends	(South Korea) T1
Jeong Ji-hoon	League of Legends	(South Korea) Gen.G
Park Jae-hyuk	League of Legends	(China) JD Gaming
Ryu Min-seok	League of Legends	(South Korea) T1
Kwon Soon-bin	Peacekeeper Elite	(South Korea) DUKSAN Esports
Kim Dong-hyun	Peacekeeper Elite	(South Korea) Nongshim RedForce
Kim Seong-hyeon	Peacekeeper Elite	(South Korea) Nongshim RedForce
Park Sang-cheol	Peacekeeper Elite	(South Korea) Dplus
Choi Young-jae	Peacekeeper Elite	(South Korea) zz
Kim Kwan-woo	Street Fighter V	—
Yeon Je-gil	Street Fighter V	—

Head coach

- Shin Bo-seok (FC Online)
- Kim "kkOma" Jeong-gyun (LoL)
- Yoon Sang-hoon (Peacekeeper)
- Kang Seong-hoon (Street Fighter)

Legend

- Team – describes last
  team before the tournament

Roster

== Competitive record ==
=== Asian Games ===
Host/Year	Total			
Host/Year	Gold medal	Silver medal	Bronze medal	Total
(China) 2022	2	0	1	3
Total	2	0	1	3
