= 2024 Esports World Cup – League of Legends =

League of Legends tournament at the 2024 Esports World Cup

League of Legends at the 2024 Esports World Cup
Tournament information
- Sport: League of Legends
- Location: Saudi Arabia
- Dates: July 4–7
- Administrator: Esports World Cup Foundation; Supervised by ESL and sanctioned by Riot Games
- Tournament format: 8 team single-elimination bracket
- Venue: 1 (in 1 host city)
- Teams: 8

Final positions
- Champion: T1
- Runner-up: Top Esports
- MVP: Lee "Faker" Sang-hyeok (T1)

The multiplayer online battle arena (MOBA) video game League of Legends had a tournament at the 2024 Esports World Cup, held in Riyadh, Saudi Arabia, from July 4 to 7, 2024. Eight teams took part in this tournament, marketed as Esports World Cup presenting League of Legends, two each from the four major competitive regions – LCS (North America), LEC (EMEA), LCK (Korea) and LPL (China). T1 of the League of Legends Champions Korea (LCK) would win the tournament, defeating Top Esports of the League of Legends Pro League (LPL) 3–1 in the final.

== Format ==
The eight teams that participate in the tournament were put into a single-elimination bracket, not unlike the one used at the League of Legends World Championship. The only difference to the Worlds bracket was that the quarter-finals and semi-finals were best-of-3 games; the final was a traditional best-of-5 series.

Due to the top 8 teams at each EWC tournament gaining Club Championship points, all 8 teams participating will earn points, with each organization able to qualify for the Club Championship itself (or win the Club Championship should they win the League tournament) if they place in the top 8 in another EWC event.

== Invited teams ==
The eight teams that were invited to the tournament were announced on May 24, 2024. Each of the 4 major competitive regions in League, the LCS, LEC, LCK and LPL, had two teams invited. All eight teams that were invited competed in the 2024 Mid-Season Invitational, having qualified by finishing among the top two teams in their domestic leagues for their spring splits (the LEC had winter and spring splits, with the winners of both splits qualifying for MSI and therefore being invited for the League event at the EWC).

Region	League	Position	Team
China	LPL	Spring champion	Bilibili Gaming
China	LPL	Spring runner-up	Top Esports
South Korea	LCK	Spring champion	Gen.G
South Korea	LCK	Spring runner-up	T1
EMEA	LEC	Spring champion	G2 Esports
EMEA	LEC	Championship points (Note: Due to G2 Esports winning both the LEC Winter and Spring splits, Fnatic qualified for MSI (and were ultimately invited to the EWC tournament) by being the next highest LEC team in terms of championship points after the Spring split.)	Fnatic
North America	LCS	Spring champion	Team Liquid
North America	LCS	Spring runner-up	FlyQuest

== Venue ==
The Qiddiya Arena, a purpose-built esports stadium for the Esports World Cup in Riyadh's Boulevard City, will host all matches during the tournament.

Saudi Arabia
Riyadh; Boulevard City
All stages
Qiddiya Arena
Capacity: 5,155
2024 Esports World Cup – League of Legends is located in Saudi Arabia

== Bracket ==
All start times are listed in Arabia Standard Time (AST, UTC+03:00).

Quarterfinals (Best-of-3)
July 4, 6:00 pm
Bilibili Gaming	1
T1	2
July 4, 9:00 pm
Team Liquid	2
Fnatic	0
July 5, 6:00 pm
Gen.G	0
Top Esports	2
July 5, 9:00 pm
G2 Esports	2
FlyQuest	1

Semifinals (Best-of-3)
July 6, 6:00 pm
T1	2
Team Liquid	1
July 6, 9:00 pm
Top Esports	2
G2 Esports	0

Finals (Best-of-5)
July 7, 7:00 pm
T1	3
Top Esports	1

== Ranking ==
Place	Team	QF	SF	Finals	Prize (%)	Prize (USD)	EWC Points
1st	T1	2–1	2–1	3–1	40%	$400,000	1000
2nd	Top Esports	2–0	2–0	1–3	20%	$200,000	600
3rd–4th	G2 Esports	2–1	0–2		10%	$100,000	275
3rd–4th	Team Liquid	2–0	1–2		10%	$100,000	275
5th–8th	FlyQuest	1–2			5%	$50,000	60
5th–8th	Gen.G	0–2			5%	$50,000	60
5th–8th	Fnatic	0–2			5%	$50,000	60
5th–8th	Bilibili Gaming	1–2			5%	$50,000	60
Place	Team	QF	SF	Finals	Prize (%)	Prize (USD)	EWC Points
