= 2023 League of Legends World Championship =

13th competition of the League of Legends World Championship

Tournament information
- Game: League of Legends
- Location: South Korea
- Dates: October 10–November 19
- Administrator: Riot Games
- Tournament formats: 8 team GSL-style double-elimination bracket play-in stage; 16 team swiss stage; 8 team single-elimination bracket from quarterfinals onward
- Venues: 4 (in 2 host cities): Seoul (play-ins, swiss stage, final); Busan (quarterfinals, semifinals)
- Teams: 22

Final positions
- Champion: T1
- Runner-up: Weibo Gaming

Tournament statistics
- Attendance: 18,000 (Finals)
- MVP: Choi "Zeus" Woo-je (T1)
- Highest KDA: Lee "Gumayusi" Min-hyeong (10.6) (T1)
- Highest Kills: Kim "Aiming" Ha-ram (14) (Gen.G)

The 2023 League of Legends World Championship (Korean: 2023 리그 오브 레전드 월드 챔피언십) was an esports tournament for the multiplayer online battle arena video game League of Legends. It was the thirteenth iteration of the League of Legends World Championship, an annual international tournament organized by the game's developer, Riot Games. The tournament began in South Korea on October 10 until November 19. Twenty-two teams from nine regions qualified for the tournament based on their placement in regional circuits; defending champions DRX failed to do so after losing to Dplus KIA in the 2023 LCK Regional Finals. JD Gaming were in contention to become the first team to complete the "Golden Road" (Note: When a team wins all four major League of Legends titles in a single season (Spring and Summer domestic titles, Mid-Season Invitational and the World Championship).), but lost to eventual champions T1 in the semifinals of the knockout stage.

"Gods" (stylized in all caps), performed by NewJeans, was announced as the tournament's theme song. A virtual boyband named "Heartsteel" (stylized in all caps) was unveiled by Riot Games during the event, with Baekhyun from Exo and SuperM, ØZI, Tobi Lou and Cal Scruby representing the group as its human counterpart and in the live performance of their debut song, "Paranoia".

The final took place on 19 November 2023 at the Gocheok Sky Dome, where T1 defeated Weibo Gaming by a 3–0 score, marking the organization's record-extending fourth World Championship. The event's concurrent viewership reached a peak of 6.4 million viewers, breaking the all-time viewership record for a single esports event, not accounting for Chinese viewership.

== Format changes ==
Starting from 2023, teams from LCL (CIS), TCL (Turkey), and LCO (Oceania) region no longer qualified directly for Worlds due to their leagues being cancelled (LCL, by the ongoing Russian invasion of Ukraine) and downgraded (TCL became a regional league for EMEA Masters, LCO was merged into PCS).

The number of teams was decreased from 24 to 22 compared to 2022. For seedings, first-seeded teams from PCS (Asia-Pacific) and VCS (Vietnam) were relegated to start in the play-in stage, while fourth-seeded teams from LCK (South Korea), LPL (China) and third-seeded from LEC (EMEA) and LCS (North America) were promoted to the main event. Prior to the kick off of the tournament, a "Worlds Qualifying Series" match between the fourth-seeded teams from LEC and LCS was played to decide the last team for the play-in stage.

Play-in groups were changed to a GSL-style double-elimination format, while main event's first stage was changed from a double round-robin group stage to a Swiss format.

== Qualified teams ==
The following teams qualified for the event:

Region	League	Qualification Path	Team	Pool
Started from Swiss Stage
South Korea	LCK	Summer Champion	Gen.G	1
South Korea	LCK	Most Championship Points	T1	2
South Korea	LCK	Regional Finals Winner	KT Rolster	3
South Korea	LCK	Regional Finals Runner-Up	Dplus KIA	4
China	LPL	Summer Champion	JD Gaming	1
China	LPL	Most Championship Points	Bilibili Gaming	2
China	LPL	Regional Finals Winner	LNG Esports	3
China	LPL	Regional Finals Runner-Up	Weibo Gaming	4
EMEA	LEC	Season Finals Champion	G2 Esports	1
EMEA	LEC	Season Finals Runner-Up	Fnatic	2
EMEA	LEC	Season Finals Place	MAD Lions	3
North America	LCS	Championship Champion	NRG Esports	1
North America	LCS	Championship Runner-Up	Cloud9	2
North America	LCS	Championship Third Place	Team Liquid	3
Started from Play-in Stage
EMEA	LEC	Worlds Qualifying Series Winner	Team BDS	1
Asia-Pacific	PCS	Summer Champion	PSG Talon	1
Asia-Pacific	PCS	Summer Runner-Up	CTBC Flying Oyster	1
Vietnam	VCS	Summer Champion	GAM Esports	1
Vietnam	VCS	Summer Runner-Up	Team Whales	2
Japan	LJL	Summer Champion	DetonatioN FocusMe	2
Brazil	CBLOL	Split 2 Champion	LOUD	2
Latin America	LLA	Closing Champion	Movistar R7	2

== Venues ==
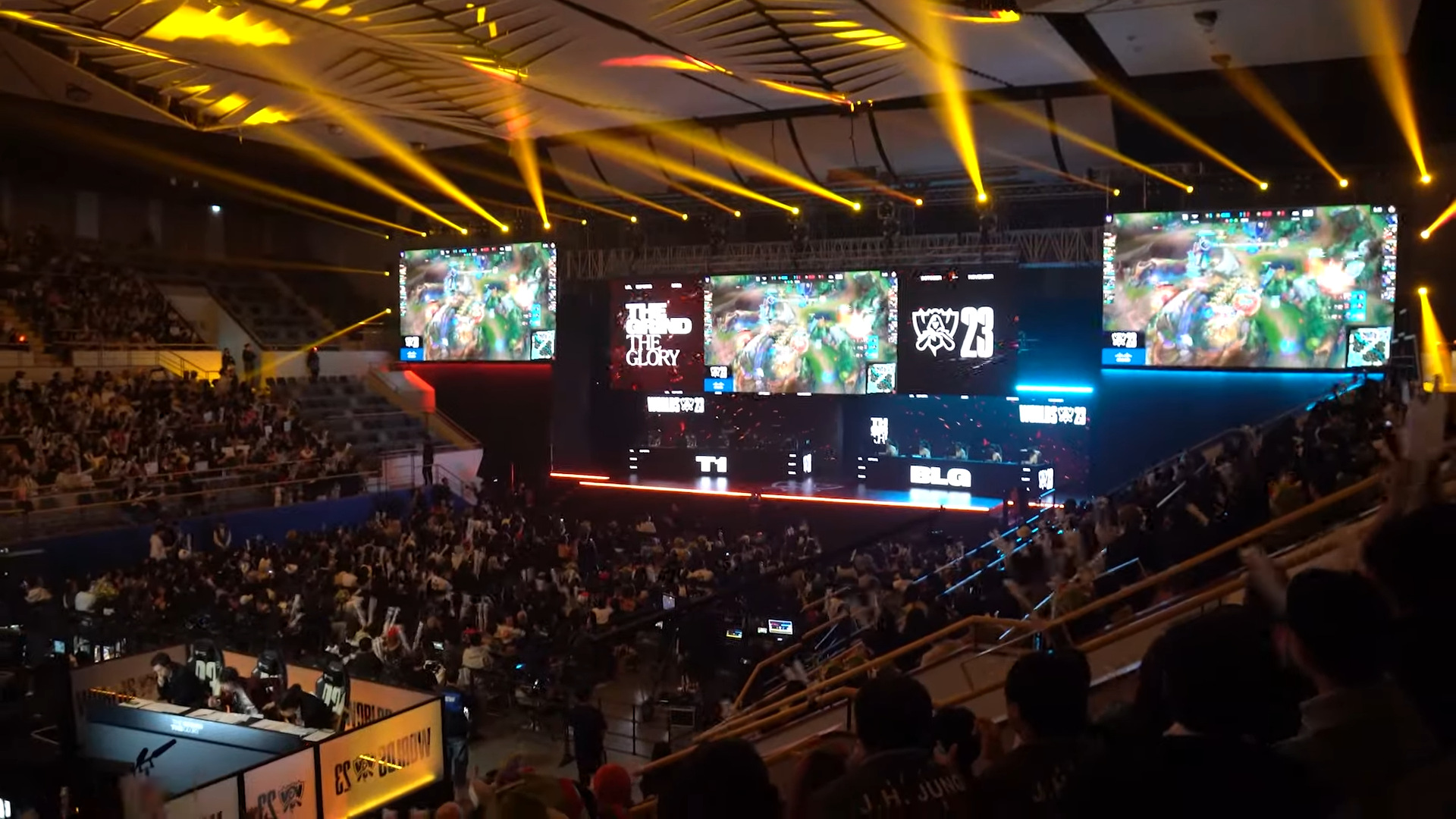
The Swiss Stage was played at KBS Arena (pictured above is the match between T1 and BLG)

Seoul and Busan were the two cities chosen to host the tournament. The LoL Park, which hosted the play-in stage of the tournament, is the only venue that hosted a Worlds tournament, having hosted the same phase during the 2018 League of Legends World Championship.

South Korea
Seoul		Busan	Seoul
Play-in Stage (Note: Including the Worlds Qualifying Series)	Swiss Stage	Quarterfinals and Semifinals	Finals
LoL Park	KBS Arena	Sajik Indoor Gymnasium	Gocheok Sky Dome
Capacity: 450	Capacity: 1,824	Capacity: 14,099	Capacity: 16,744
2023 League of Legends World Championship is located in South Korea

== Worlds Qualifying Series ==
- Date and time: October 9, start time at 13:00 (KST) (UTC+9)
- The fourth-seeded teams from LEC (Team BDS) and LCS (Golden Guardians) faced off in a best-of-five series to determine the last team that would qualify for the play-in stage.

Qualifying Match
October 9, 1:00 pm
Team BDS	3
Golden Guardians	0

== Play-in stage ==
=== Groups ===
- Date and time: October 10–14, start time at 16:00 KST (UTC+9)
- 8 teams were divided into 2 groups of four teams each playing in a GSL-style double-elimination format. Teams from same region could not be placed in the same group.
- All matches were best-of-three.

Group A

Opening Matches
October 10, 7:00 pm
LOUD	2
GAM Esports	0
October 10, 4:00 pm
Movistar R7	0
PSG Talon	2
Elimination Match
October 13, 4:00 pm
GAM Esports	2
Movistar R7	0

Winner's Match
October 12, 4:00 pm
LOUD	0
PSG Talon	2
Decider Match
October 14, 4:00 pm
LOUD	0
GAM Esports	2

Advance to Qualifiers
A1	PSG Talon
A2	GAM Esports

Group B

Opening Matches
October 11, 7:00 pm
Team BDS	1
Team Whales	2
October 11, 4:00 pm
DetonatioN FocusMe	0
CTBC Flying Oyster	2
Elimination Match
October 13, 7:00 pm
Team BDS	2
DetonatioN FocusMe	0

Winner's Match
October 12, 7:00 pm
Team Whales	2
CTBC Flying Oyster	1
Decider Match
October 14, 7:00 pm
CTBC Flying Oyster	0
Team BDS	2

Advance to Qualifiers
B1	Team Whales
B2	Team BDS

=== Qualifiers ===
- Date and time: October 15, start time at 12:00 KST (UTC+9)
- Upper bracket winner of one group faced the lower bracket winner of the other group.
- Qualifiers were best-of-five.
- Two winners of the qualifiers advanced to the swiss stage as Pool 4.

Qualifying Matches
October 15, 12:00 pm
A1	PSG Talon	2
B2	Team BDS	3
October 15, 5:00 pm
B1	Team Whales	1
A2	GAM Esports	3

Qualified
Q	Team BDS
Q	GAM Esports

== Swiss stage ==
- Date and time: October 19–29, start time at 14:00 KST (UTC+9)
- 16 teams play in Swiss-system format with five rounds.
  - In Round 1, Pool 1 teams will play against Pool 4 teams, and Pool 2 teams will play against Pool 3 teams. Teams from the same region do not play against each other.
  - From Round 2 onward, teams with the same record will play each other. Match up will be determined by draw after each round and teams from the same region can play each other.
  - Teams had matched each other in previous rounds will not matched again until last round (score 2–2).
- Teams with three wins advance to knockout stage, while teams with three losses are eliminated.
- All advancement and elimination are best-of-three, with all other matches being best-of-one.

=== Bracket ===
Advance to knockouts
2–0	Gen.G
1–0	G2 Esports	0	JD Gaming
0–0	Weibo Gaming	0	Gen.G	2	Advance to knockouts
T1	1	G2 Esports	1	JD Gaming	2	2–1	T1
Team Liquid	0	Bilibili Gaming	0	LNG Esports	1	KT Rolster	1	NRG Esports
Cloud9	1	JD Gaming	1	LNG Esports	2	LNG Esports
MAD Lions	0	LNG Esports	1	1–1	T1	2	Advance to knockouts
Gen.G	1	Cloud9	0	NRG Esports	1	Bilibili Gaming	0	2–2	KT Rolster
GAM Esports	0	Gen.G	1	MAD Lions	0	NRG Esports	2	KT Rolster	2	Weibo Gaming
Team BDS	0	T1	0	T1	1	G2 Esports	0	Dplus KIA	0	Bilibili Gaming
JD Gaming	1	Cloud9	0	G2 Esports	1
G2 Esports	1	0–1	KT Rolster	1	1–2	Bilibili Gaming	2	Eliminated
Dplus KIA	0	Team Liquid	0	Weibo Gaming	0	Cloud9	1	Fnatic	1	G2 Esports
Weibo Gaming	1	NRG Esports	1	Bilibili Gaming	1	Fnatic	2	Weibo Gaming	2	Fnatic
NRG Esports	0	Dplus KIA	0	Fnatic	0	Dplus KIA	2	Dplus KIA
LNG Esports	1	KT Rolster	1	GAM Esports	0	Eliminated
Fnatic	0	Team BDS	0	0–2	Weibo Gaming	2	Cloud9
Bilibili Gaming	1	MAD Lions	1	Dplus KIA	2	MAD Lions	0	MAD Lions
KT Rolster	0	Fnatic	1	Team BDS	0	GAM Esports
GAM Esports	0	Team Liquid	1	Eliminated
GAM Esports	2	Team Liquid
Team BDS

== Knockout stage ==
- Date and time: November 2–19, all games start time at 17:00 KST (UTC+9)
- Eight teams from Swiss stage are drawn into a single-elimination bracket.
  - Two teams with a 3–0 record in the swiss stage are on opposite sides of the bracket and face those with a 3–2 record, while all remaining teams will be seeded randomly.
- All matches are best-of-five.
- The members of the winning team will lift the Summoner's Cup, earning their title as the League of Legends 2023 World Champions.

=== Qualified teams ===
Eight teams qualified for the playoff portion of the tournament from the swiss stage.

Pools	Teams
Pool 1 (3–0)	JD Gaming
Pool 1 (3–0)	Gen.G
Pool 2 (3–1)	LNG Esports
Pool 2 (3–1)	NRG Esports
Pool 2 (3–1)	T1
Pool 3 (3–2)	KT Rolster
Pool 3 (3–2)	Weibo Gaming
Pool 3 (3–2)	Bilibili Gaming

=== Bracket ===
Quarterfinals
2 November, 17:00 KST – Busan
NRG Esports	0
Weibo Gaming	3
3 November, 17:00 KST – Busan
Gen.G	2
Bilibili Gaming	3
4 November, 17:00 KST – Busan
JD Gaming	3
KT Rolster	1
5 November, 17:00 KST – Busan
LNG Esports	0
T1	3

Semifinals
11 November, 17:00 KST – Busan
Weibo Gaming	3
Bilibili Gaming	2
12 November, 17:00 KST – Busan
JD Gaming	1
T1	3

Final
19 November, 17:00 KST – Seoul
Weibo Gaming	0
T1	3

== Ranking ==
=== Team ranking ===
Place	Team	PG	PQ	SS	QF	SF	Finals	Prize (%)	Prize (USD)
1st	T1	–	–	3–1	3–0	3–1	3–0	20%	$445,000
2nd	Weibo Gaming	–	–	3–2	3–0	3–2	0–3	15%	$333,750
3rd–4th	JD Gaming	–	–	3–0	3–1	1–3		8%	$178,000
3rd–4th	Bilibili Gaming	–	–	3–2	3–2	2–3		8%	$178,000
5th–8th	Gen.G	–	–	3–0	2–3			4.5%	$100,125
5th–8th	KT Rolster	–	–	3–2	1–3			4.5%	$100,125
5th–8th	NRG Esports	–	–	3–1	0–3			4.5%	$100,125
5th–8th	LNG Esports	–	–	3–1	0–3			4.5%	$100,125
9th–11th	G2 Esports	–	–	2–3				3.25%	$72,312.50
9th–11th	Fnatic	–	–	2–3				3.25%	$72,312.50
9th–11th	Dplus KIA	–	–	2–3				3.25%	$72,312.50
12th–14th	Cloud9	–	–	1–3				2.75%	$61,187.50
12th–14th	MAD Lions	–	–	1–3				2.75%	$61,187.50
12th–14th	GAM Esports	2–1	3–1	1–3				2.75%	$61,187.50
15th–16th	Team Liquid	–	–	0–3				2.25%	$50,062.50
15th–16th	Team BDS	2–1	3–2	0–3				2.25%	$50,062.50
17th–18th	PSG Talon	2–0	2–3					1.75%	$38,937.50
17th–18th	Team Whales	2–0	1–3					1.75%	$38,937.50
19th–20th	CTBC Flying Oyster	1–2						1.5%	$33,375
19th–20th	LOUD	1–2						1.5%	$33,375
21st–22nd	DetonatioN FocusMe	0–2						1%	$22,250
21st–22nd	Movistar R7	0–2						1%	$22,250
Place	Team	PG	PQ	SS	QF	SF	Finals	Prize (%)	Prize (USD)
