= Esports at the 2022 Asian Games =

- Venue: Hangzhou Esports Center
- Dates: 24 September – 2 October 2023
- Competitors: 475 from 30 nations

Esports at the 2022 Asian Games were held at Hangzhou Esports Center in Hangzhou, China from 24 September to 2 October 2023.

This was the first edition of the Asian Games that featured esports as a medal event, after debuting as a demonstration sport in 2018, and the second major multi-sport event to do so after the SEA Games since 2019. AliSports, the sports arm of Chinese multinational technology company, Alibaba Group, partnered with the Olympic Council of Asia to bring esports to the Asian Games.

A qualification tournament called AESF Road to Asian Games 2022 was played earlier for all titles featured. The results of this tournament were also used to determine the countries' seedings for the upcoming Games, with no participants being eliminated through this event.

A total of 8 medal events in esports were planned along with 2 demonstration events focused in robotics and VR, all of them within the mind sports category. But in March 2023, the Olympic Council of Asia approved a decision to remove Hearthstone from the announced list of events due to the closure of Blizzard service in mainland China.

Two demonstration events AIES Robot Sports – Ultimate Battle Robots and AIES XR Sports – Steelraid were held after the Asian Games on 11 and 12 November 2023.

== Schedule ==
P	Preliminary rounds	¼	Quarterfinals	½	Semifinals	F	Finals

Event↓/Date →	24th Sun		25th Mon		26th Tue	27th Wed		28th Thu		29th Fri	30th Sat	1st Sun	2nd Mon
EA Sports FC Online	P		P	½		½	F						
Street Fighter V					P	P	½	½	F				
Arena of Valor	P	¼	½		F								
Dota 2										P	¼	½	F
Dream Three Kingdoms 2						P		¼		½	F		
League of Legends			P		P	¼		½		F			
PUBG Mobile						P		P		¼	½	F	

== Medalists ==
Event	Gold	Silver	Bronze
EA Sports FC Online	Teedech Songsaisakul; Thailand	Phatanasak Varanan; Thailand	Kwak Jun-hyouk; South Korea
Street Fighter V	Kim Gwan-woo; South Korea	Hsiang Yu-lin; Chinese Taipei	Lin Li-wei; Chinese Taipei
Arena of Valor	China; Sun Linwei; Lin Heng; Chi Xiaoming; Xu Bicheng; Jiang Tao; Luo Siyuan	Malaysia; Nicholas Ng; Yong Zhan Quan; Lai Chia Chien; Ong Jun Yang; Chong Han Hui; Eng Jun Hao	Thailand; Vatcharanan Thaworn; Chayut Suebka; Kawee Wachiraphas; Anusak Manpdong; Sorawat Boonphrom
Dota 2	China; Wang Chunyu; Lu Yao; Yang Shenyi; Zhao Zixing; Yu Yajun; Xiong Jiahan	Mongolia; Altanginjiin Bilgüün; Otgondavaagiin Sükhbat; Battsoojiin Mönkh-Erdene; Narankhandyn Batbayasgalan; Dashzevegiin Tögstör	Malaysia; Daniel Chan; Cheng Jin Xiang; Thiay Jun Wen; Ng Wei Poong; Yap Jian Wei; Tue Soon Chuan
Dream Three Kingdoms 2	China; Cheng Long; Cheng Hu; Fu Haojie; Yao Xing; Zhou Ke; Guo Runmin	Hong Kong; Law Hing Lung; Chan Cheuk Kit; Yip Ho Lam; Yuen Pak Lam; Yip Wai Lam	Thailand; Chatchapon Chanthorn; Werit Popan; Pachara Thongeiam; Walunchai Sukarin; Teerapat Supasdetch; Attakit Samattakitwanich
League of Legends	South Korea; Choi Woo-je; Seo Jin-hyeok; Jung Ji-hun; Park Jae-hyeok; Ryu Min-seok; Lee Sang-hyeok	Chinese Taipei; Xu Shi-Jie; Hung Hao-hsuan; Chu Jun-lan; Chiu Tzu-chuan; Hu Shuo-chieh; Su Chia-hsiang	China; Chen Zebin; Zhao Lijie; Zhuo Ding; Zhao Jiahao; Tian Ye; Peng Lixun
PUBG Mobile	China; Liu Yunyu; Zhu Bocheng; Zhang Jianhui; Chen Yumeng; Huang Can	South Korea; Choi Young-jae; Kim Dong-hyeon; Kwon Soon-bin; Kim Sung-hyun; Park Sang-cheol	Chinese Taipei; Chiang Chien-ting; Wang Bo-zhi; Tsai Cheng-fu; Wang Chin-hung; Chen Hung-ming

== Medal table ==
Rank	Nation	Gold	Silver	Bronze	Total
1	China (CHN)	4	0	1	5
2	South Korea (KOR)	2	1	1	4
3	Thailand (THA)	1	1	2	4
4	Chinese Taipei (TPE)	0	2	2	4
5	Malaysia (MAS)	0	1	1	2
6	Hong Kong (HKG)	0	1	0	1
6	Mongolia (MGL)	0	1	0	1
Totals (7 entries)		7	7	7	21

== Participating nations ==
A total of 475 athletes from 30 nations competed in esports at the 2022 Asian Games:

- Bahrain (4)
- China (31)
- Chinese Taipei (19)
- Hong Kong (31)
- India (15)
- Indonesia (13)
- Japan (12)
- Jordan (7)
- Kazakhstan (28)
- Kuwait (1)
- Kyrgyzstan (15)
- Laos (15)
- Macau (19)
- Malaysia (19)
- Maldives (13)
- Mongolia (10)
- Myanmar (16)
- Nepal (22)
- Palestine (12)
- Philippines (25)
- Qatar (4)
- Saudi Arabia (21)
- Singapore (1)
- South Korea (15)
- Sri Lanka (4)
- Tajikistan (12)
- Thailand (32)
- United Arab Emirates (10)
- Uzbekistan (23)
- Vietnam (26)
