= League of Legends in esports =

League of Legends Esports
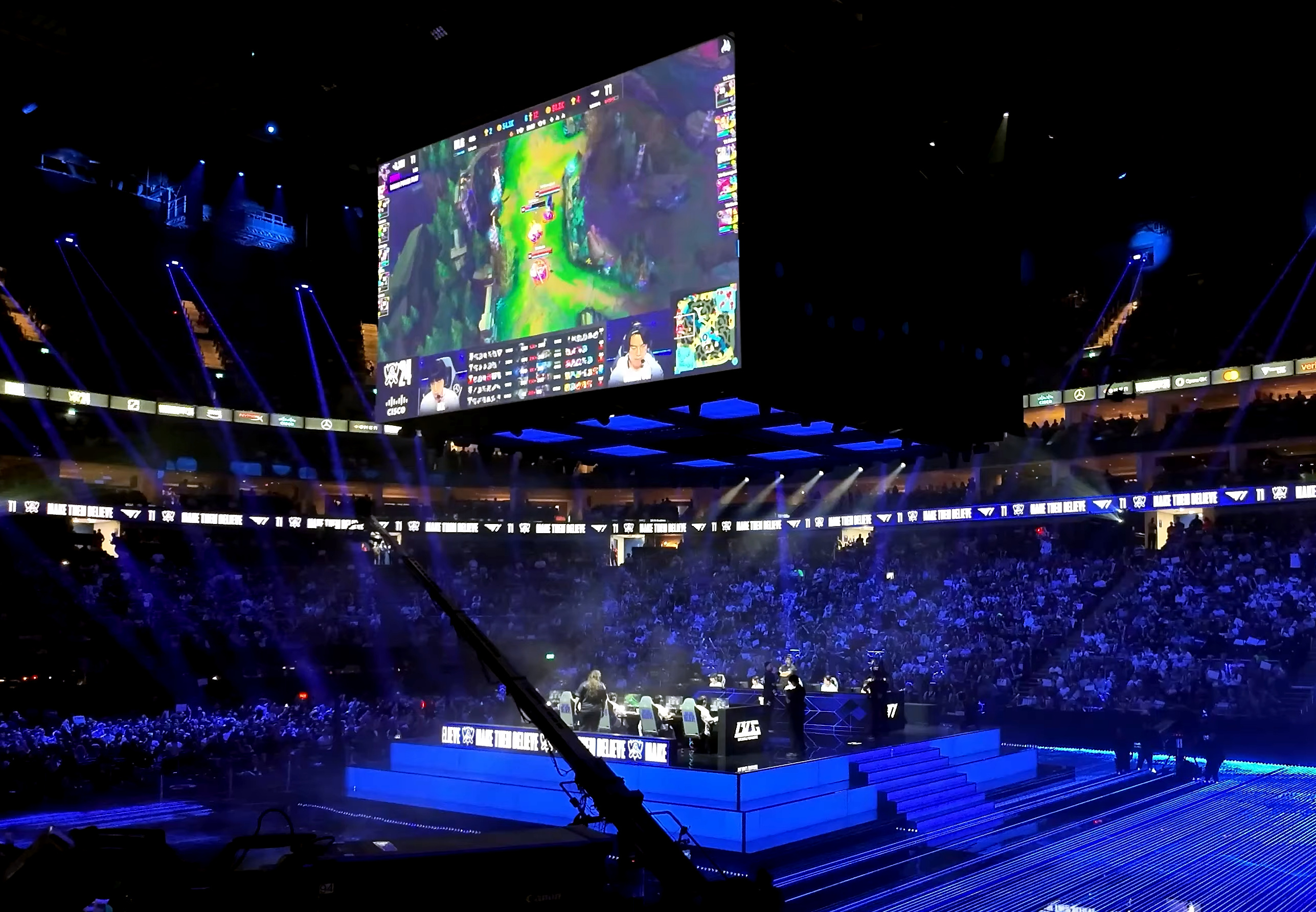
- The stage for the 2024 League of Legends World Championship Finals in the O2 Arena
- Game: League of Legends
- Founded: 2010; 16 years ago
- First season: 2012; 14 years ago
- Owner: Riot Games
- Director: Chris Greeley
- Country: Global
- Website: lolesports.com

League of Legends esports (stylized as LoL Esports) is the professional competition of the multiplayer online battle arena video game League of Legends. The game, released in 2009, was the first to be developed and published by Riot Games. Esports tournaments for the game began as early as 2010, most notably with the 2010 World Cyber Games when it was featured as a promotion game. In 2011, the first edition of the League of Legends World Championship was held at DreamHack in Jönköping, Sweden, which was won by Fnatic.

League of Legends is one of the largest esports with various annual tournaments taking place worldwide. In terms of esports professional gaming as of June 2016, League of Legends has had US$29,203,916 in prize money, 4,083 Players, and 1,718 tournaments, compared to Dota 2's US$64,397,286 of prize money, 1,495 players, and 613 tournaments.

Former League Championship Series commissioner Chris Greeley is the current Global Head of League of Legends Esports (LoL Esports) for Riot Games since 2024.

== History ==
=== 2011–2012: Early years ===
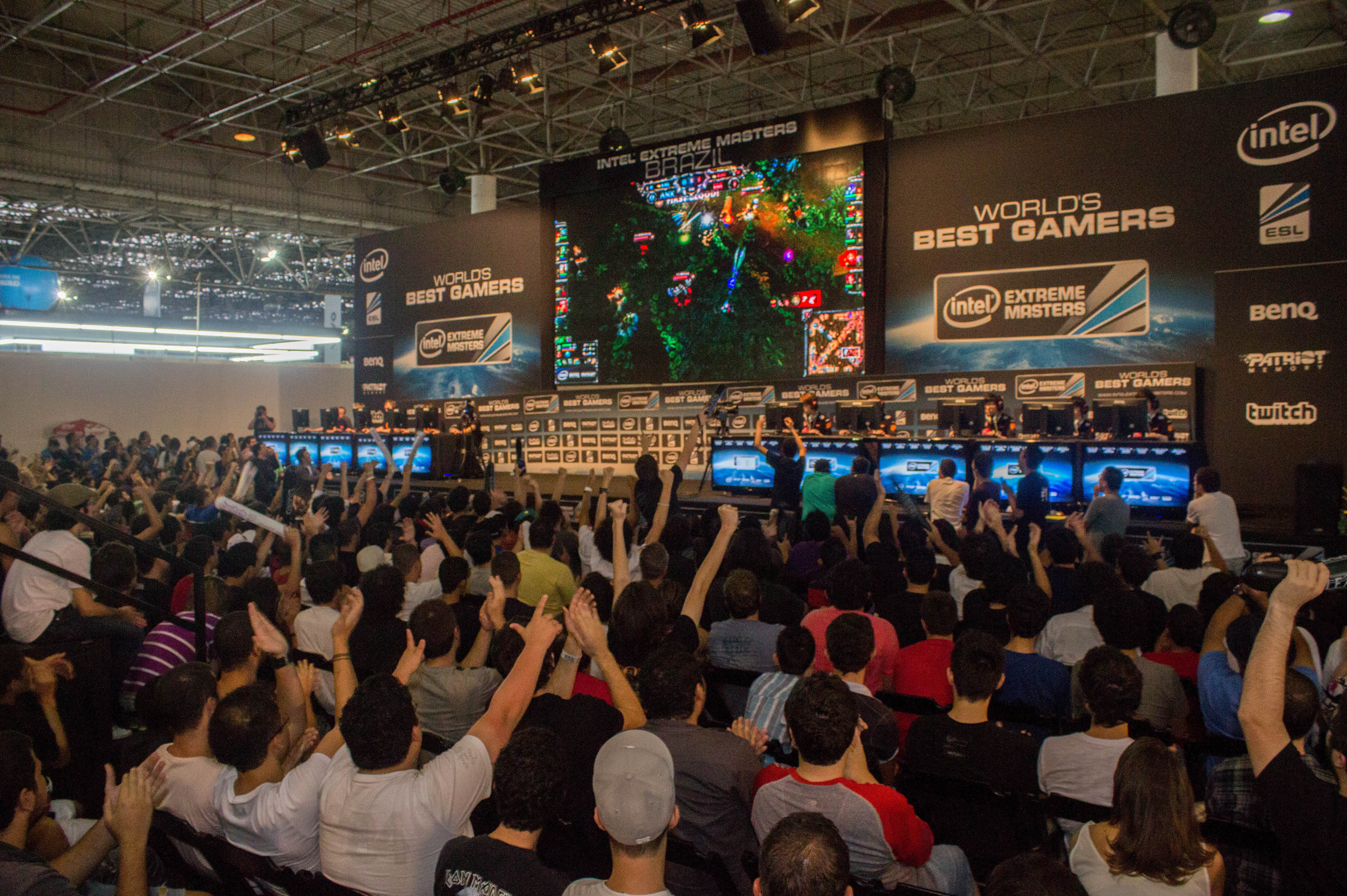
A match at Final Intel Extreme Masters World Best Gamers League Of Legends in Brazil in 2013

League of Legends has 16 years of competitive history, with competitions beginning in 2010. On 30 June of that year, Riot Games, the game's developer, and World Cyber Games Inc., announced that it would be featured at the 2010 World Cyber Games in Los Angeles, United States as one of the promotional game titles, with representatives from China, Europe, North America, and Southeast Asia forming teams of five players. American team Counter Logic Gaming won the tournament, defeating European representatives SK Gaming. Prior to the World Cyber Games, League of Legends has built a strong player base, but the introduction of drafts and ranked mode brought competitive experience to the game. As Riot Games was seeing growing viewership, it decided to enter the competitive scene with the first World Championship in 2011, which would be hosted by DreamHack in Jönköping, Sweden. The inaugural tournament saw players bringing their own computers and competing in front of fans, while networking with other fellow players Eight teams competed - three each from North America and Europe, and one team each from Singapore and the Philippines. European representative Fnatic would win the inaugural World Championship, which saw over 1.6 million accumulated viewers, with a peak viewership of 210,000 concurrent viewers.

In 2012, the first two regional leagues would be established - the League Championship Series of both North America (NA LCS) and Europe (EU LCS). Both leagues would have their inaugural seasons the following year in 2013. The EU LCS would later be renamed as the League of Legends European Championship (LEC) in 2019, later as EMEA Championship in 2023 to incorporate teams from Turkey, the Commonwealth of Independent States and the MENA region. The Riot Brazilian Champion League (Brazil) and The Champions (South Korea) would also be established, with both tournaments later becoming professional leagues, renaming as the Campeonato Brasileiro de League of Legends (CBLOL) and the League of Legends Champions Korea (LCK), respectively. The same year also saw Taiwanese team Taipei Assassins winning the second edition of the World Championship - the only team so far to win the title outside teams from China, Europe, and South Korea. Viewership also improved from the first edition at 1.1 million concurrent viewers during the final. A special LAN-based client was also developed as a response to delayed matches caused by network issues during the Season 2 World Playoffs, designed for use in tournament environments where the effects of lag and other network issues can be detrimental to the proper organization of an event. The LAN client was deployed for the first time during the first quarter-final and semi-final matches played following the rescheduled matches, and was in use during the finals.

=== 2013–2017: Regional leagues, first Korean dominance, and franchising ===
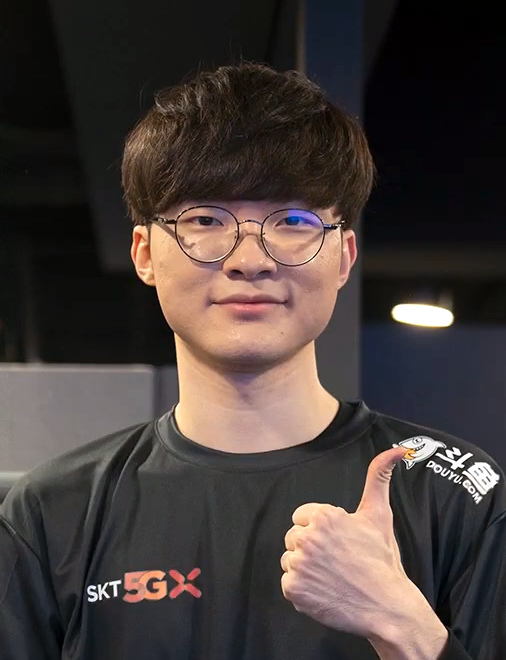
Lee "Faker" Sang-hyeok is widely regarded as one of the greatest esports players of all time.

2013 saw the establishment of the League of Legends Pro League (LPL) in China, which began with eight teams, and the first Asian team to win the World Championship, with South Korea's SK Telecom T1, which featured then-rookie Lee "Faker" Sang-hyeok, defeating China's Royal Club in the 2013 edition, with the final taking place at the Staples Center in Los Angeles. This would also start a five-year streak of Korean World Championship winners.

On 11 July 2013, Riot Games announced that the United States Citizenship and Immigration Services recognized League of Legends pro-players as professional athletes and that the P visa application process would be more simplified for them. These changes allowed professional players to stay in the United States for up to five years. Despite these reforms, there have still been a number of visa problems that have occurred for players in the LCS and other LoL tournaments entering the United States.

The 2014 World Championship was the first edition to be hosted for the first time in multiple countries (Taiwan, Singapore, and South Korea). This would become a model for future World Championship hostings, specifically in Europe and North America. In the same year, Riot Games introduced the concept of "Championship points", which teams would earn based on performance across both splits and playoffs in order to qualify for the tournament. Between 2014 and 2017, SK Telecom T1 won two world titles, and both Samsung Galaxy White and Samsung Galaxy winning one. (Note: Samsung Galaxy White won the World Championship as a sister team of Samsung Galaxy Blue in 2014. The inclusion of sister teams was discontinued in 2017.) 2015 also saw the creation of a new international tournament - the Mid-Season Invitational. The first tournament was held in 2015 in Tallahassee, Florida in the United States, and was won by Chinese team Edward Gaming, becoming the first Chinese team to win an international League of Legends title. The 2017 League of Legends World Championship was the first edition to be held in China and the first to feature a play-in stage.

Franchising in League of Legends esports also began in 2017, when the LPL announced in April of that year that it would become a franchised league, removing the promotion and relegation system. Months later, Riot Games announced that the NA LCS would follow suit with ten permanent teams beginning in 2018. Each of the ten teams would have guaranteed spots, which would encourage owners to make substantial investments, including the creation of training facilities and improvements in coaching, scouting, and player well-being. Each team was also mandated to maintain an academy squad for emerging talent development. Riot Games also raised the minimum salary for players to US$75,000, with an average annual income for League pros around $150,000. Additionally, a players' association was established to offer financial, legal, and career-building support to players. This franchising model would follow suit in the LEC (2019), CBLOL (2020), and LCK (2021).

=== 2018–2021: Growing popularity, Chinese dominance, and COVID-19 impact ===
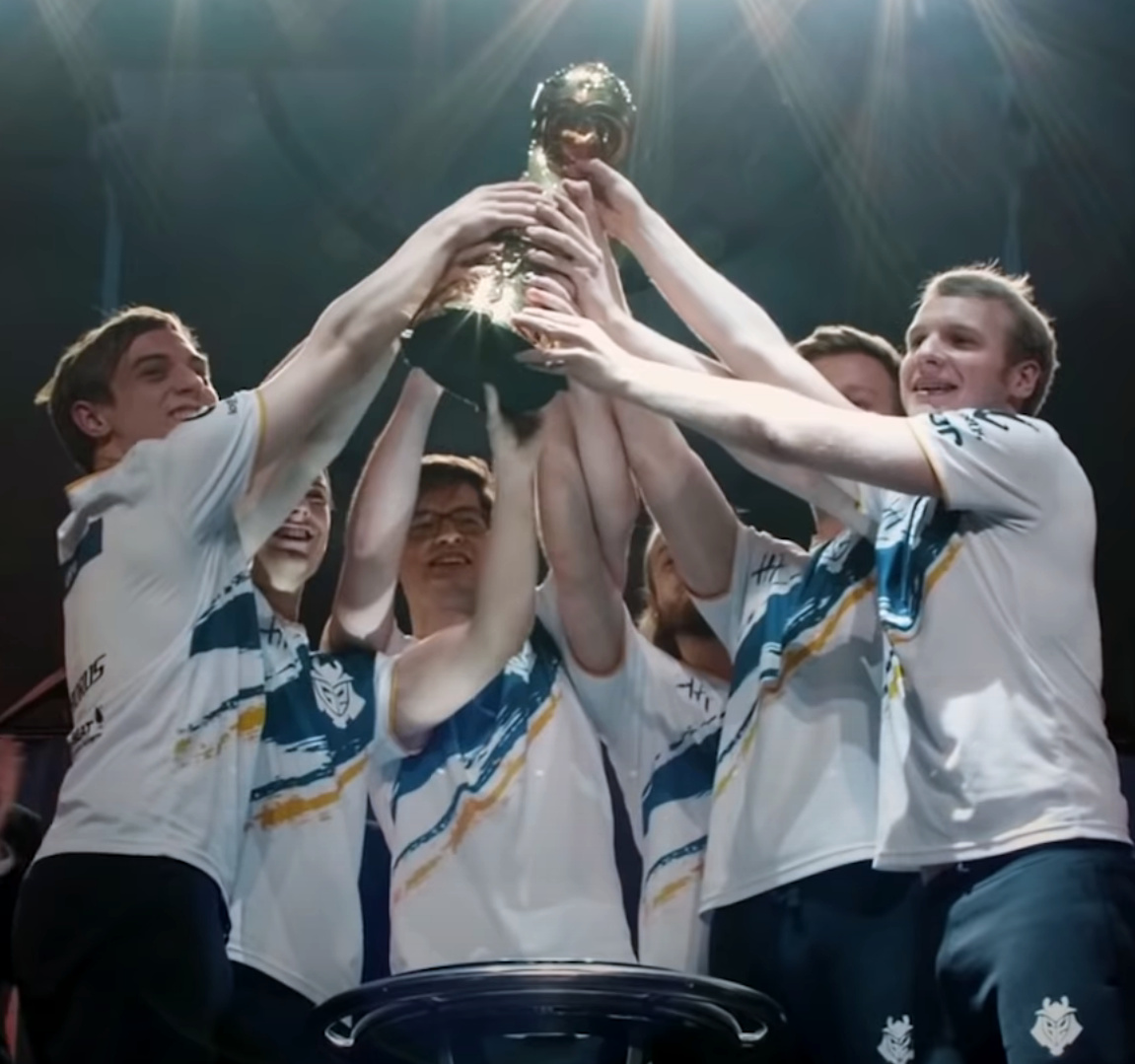
The players of G2 Esports lifting the 2019 Mid-Season Invitational trophy. Pictured left to right: Caps, Perkz, Mikyx, Promisq, Wunder, Jankos

In 2018, the LPL won its first World Championship, with Chinese team Invictus Gaming winning against European representatives Fnatic in a 3-0 sweep. The 2018 edition of the tournament also had a prize pool of $6,450,000, which remains the highest for any international League of Legends competition to date. By December 2018, each major region had its unique name, logo, and brand identities following the re-branding of the NA LCS to simply the LCS alongside an updated logo. 2018 also saw the creation of the Liga Latinoamérica (LLA), which was a merger between the Liga Latinoamérica Norte (LLN, North Latin America League) and Copa Latinoamérica Sur (CLS, South Latin America Cup). The league would cease operations six years later in 2024.

In 2019, it was announced that alongside its shift to a franchised league, the LEC's secondary league, the EU Challenger Series (EUCS), was discontinued and replaced with an independent tournament named European Masters (later EMEA Masters), which features the top teams from Europe's many regional leagues. Riot Games and Tencent also created a joint venture called "TJ Sports" to oversee all League of Legends esports operations in China, including tournament organizing, talent management, and venues. The same year would also see European team G2 Esports have major international success - winning the 2019 Mid-Season Invitational, becoming the first European team to win the tournament, and reaching the final of the 2019 League of Legends World Championship, hosted in Germany, Spain, and France. The team notably beat SK Telecom T1 in the semifinals, and were on the verge of achieving a "golden road" after winning MSI and both regional splits, but they would lose to the LPL's FunPlus Phoenix, who won the region's second consecutive world title.

The global COVID-19 pandemic had a significant impact in League of Legends esports, as the 2020 Mid-Season Invitational was cancelled and the 2020 League of Legends World Championship in China was held in an "isolation bubble" environment in Shanghai, as opposed to a previously planned multi-city hosting of the tournament. MSI was replaced by the 2020 Mid-Season Streamathon, a live stream event for a cause, with proceeds going to COVID-19 relief efforts. Regionally, leagues had to temporarily suspend operations, eventually shift to online play, and to hold games behind closed doors as opposed to having roadshows. For instance, the LCS Spring Finals weekend of the said year were planned to take place at the Ford Center in Frisco, Texas, but the event was moved to the LCS's Los Angeles studio. The final of the 2020 World Championship, however, was held with limited fans in attendance at the Pudong Football Stadium in Shanghai, with the LCK's Damwon Gaming defeating the LPL's Suning to win its first world title. Regional and international play behind closed doors continued in 2021, with all games of the Mid-Season Invitational and the World Championship being held at the Laugardalshöll in Reykjavík, Iceland, the latter of which was originally scheduled to take place in China, with Shanghai, Qingdao, Wuhan, Chengdu, and Shenzhen serving as host cities. Regional leagues also had to continue play with no spectators in attendance.

=== 2022–2024: Return to touring, Korean resurgence, and influencer teams ===
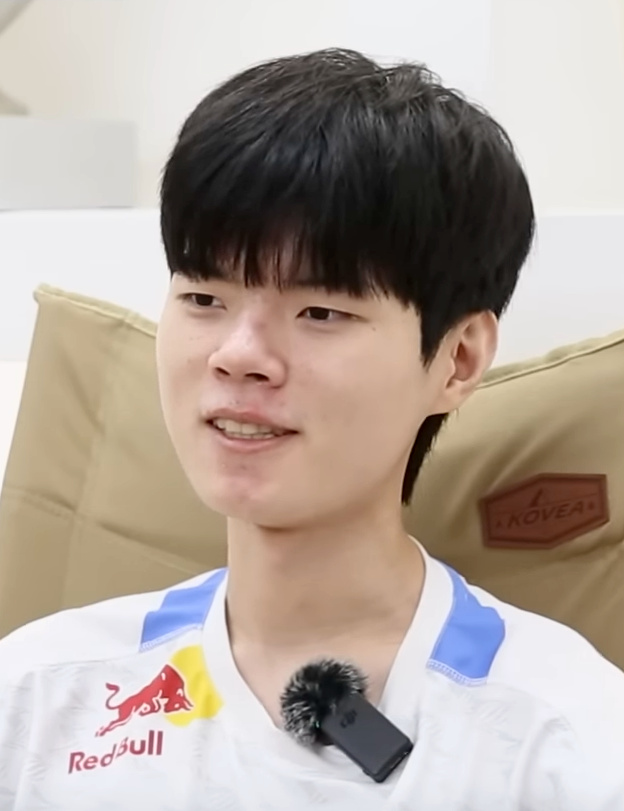
Kim "Deft" Hyuk-kyu won the 2022 World Championship with DRX, regarded as one of the greatest upsets in League of Legends history.

Spectators returned to live events beginning in 2022, with regional leagues offering limited capacities each game day. The 2022 Mid-Season Invitational was held in Busan, South Korea, which was won by the LPL's Royal Never Give Up despite competing remotely in the team's training facility due to the COVID-19 pandemic in mainland China. Mexico would host its first League of Legends World Championship in 2022 alongside the United States. Canada was originally slated to host the semi-final stage of the tournament at the Scotiabank Arena, Toronto. However, due to the impact of the COVID-19 pandemic in Canada on securing multi-entry visas, Riot Games announced the State Farm Arena in Atlanta, United States as its replacement venue. The World Championship was won by DRX, defeating T1, who went 18-0 during the LCK's Spring split of that year, with a 3-2 scoreline and is considered of a Cinderella run by commentators, with many regarding it as one of the greatest finals in the history of League of Legends. DRX also became the first team to win the world title as a fourth seed and after starting the tournament in the play-in stage. The following year's Mid-Season Invitational was the first international tournament to be held in Europe after the COVID-19 pandemic, and was won by JD Gaming after defeating Bilibili Gaming in an all-LPL final. T1 would bounce back from their 2022 defeat, winning the 2023 League of Legends World Championship on home soil, and would be the start of another streak of international victories for the LCK.

Around this time, teams associated with online influencers began to surface. One example is Disguised, a team formed by content creator Jeremy Wang, also known as Disguised Toast. The team competed in the North American Challengers League (NACL) in 2023 before being selected as a guest team for the 2025 competitive season in the LTA and in the following year for the LCS. In late 2024, former professional player and caster Marc "Caedrel" Lamont, who began full-time streaming in 2023, formed Los Ratones, a team that competed in EMEA Masters and the LEC.

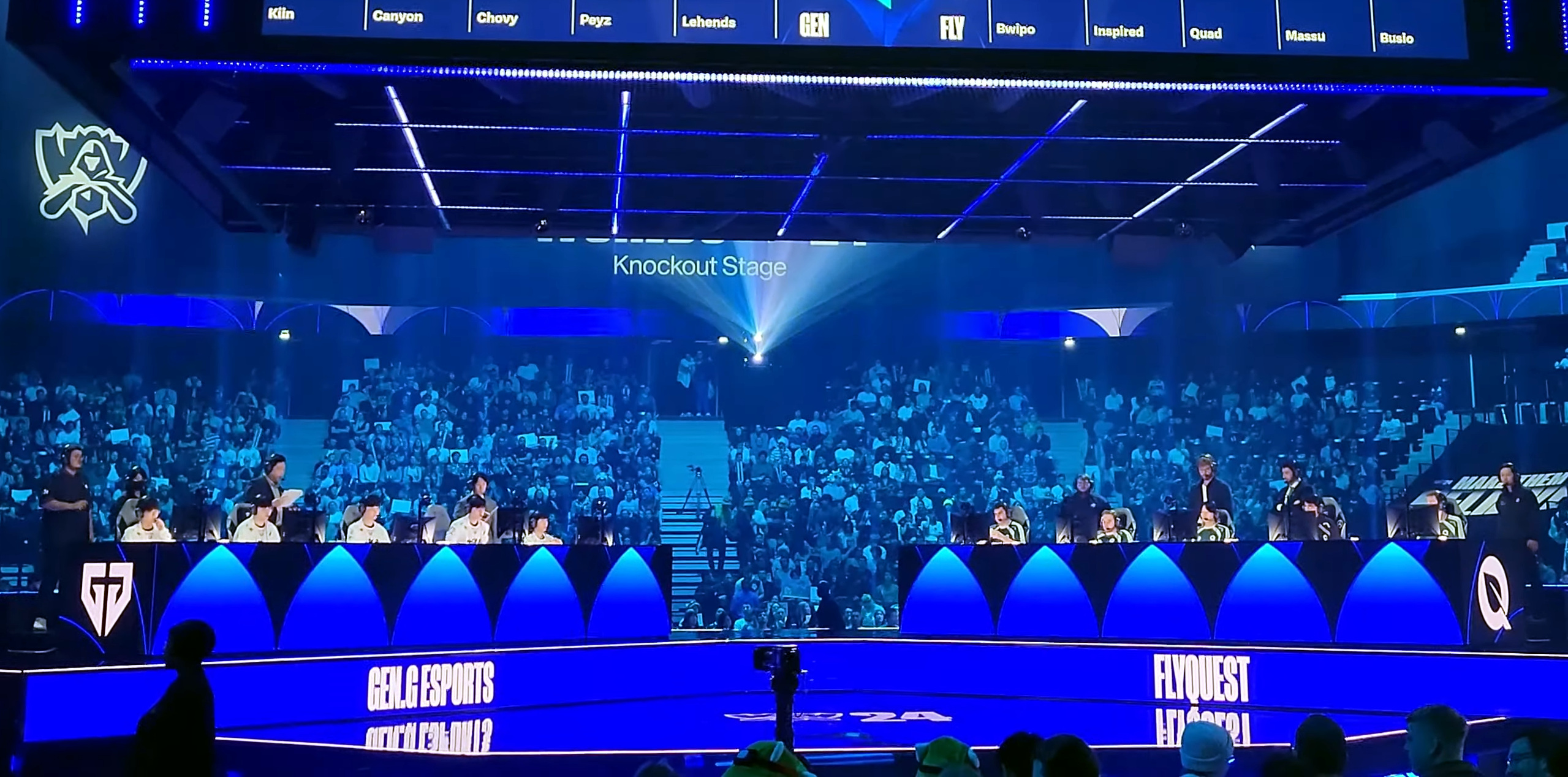
The 2024 World Championship was the most-watched event in esports history, with nearly 7 million peak viewers.

In 2024, Korean team Gen.G would win its first international title, that being the 2024 Mid-Season Invitational. Meanwhile, T1 would win back-to-back world championships for the first time since 2016, with Faker winning his fifth world title and second Finals MVP honors. In between MSI and Worlds, League of Legends was included in the Esports World Cup, a multi-title tournament series held primarily in Riyadh, Saudi Arabia, for the first time; it was the first non-Riot major tournament since the Intel Extreme Masters Season XI World Championship in 2017. The inaugural EWC tournament for the game was won by T1 over the LPL's Top Esports.

The same year also saw a major announcement from Riot Games in a blog post entitled "LoL Esports: Building Towards A Brighter Future", that a new split structure and competitive calendar would be introduced starting with the 2025 competitive season, which includes a three-split structure for all Tier 1 leagues, and a third international competition later known as the First Stand Tournament. The announcement also unveiled plans to merge the LCS, CBLOL and LLA into a Pan-American league that would begin play in 2025, which would eventually be known as the League of Legends Championship of The Americas or LTA. A merger between the Pacific Championship Series (PCS), Vietnam Championship Series (VCS), League of Legends Japan League (LJL) and League of Legends Circuit Oceania (LCO) was also planned, later to be known as the League of Legends Championship Pacific (LCP).

=== 2025–present: Restructuring and draft changes ===
2025 saw the introduction of Fearless Draft. Inspired by China's League of Legends Developmental League (LDL), it is a draft format where teams cannot pick a champion that they've already played in a series, even if the opposing team already picked that champion. This was initially planned only for the first split of the 2025 season, but was later announced to be implemented for the rest of the competitive calendar. It was later confirmed that Fearless Draft would also remain for the 2026 season.

The inaugural First Stand Tournament (FST) was held in March 2025 in Seoul, South Korea, with Hanwha Life Esports of the LCK winning the tournament and its first international title, while Gen.G would win back-to-back MSI titles. The 2025 edition of MSI was the first international League of Legends competition to be held in Canada - at the Pacific Coliseum in Vancouver. Both the LCP and LTA would launch their leagues with their first season in 2025, introducing promotion and relegation to League of Legends esports for the first time since the start of franchising, with guest teams competing. However, only the LCP is guaranteed to continue in 2026, as on 28 September 2025, Riot Games announced that the LCS and CBLOL would be returning as independent leagues beginning with the 2026 competitive season, discontinuing the LTA. Promotion and relegation will remain in both leagues in 2026, as guest teams will continue to fill up one spot per league. The 2025 League of Legends World Championship saw the first time a team win three consecutive World Championships for the first time in tournament history, with T1 winning its sixth world championship.

Riot Games introduced a new draft system called "First Selection" in 2026, where the team that usually chooses either blue or red side would now have a choice to either select a side or have either the first or second pick in the picking phase of the draft. The system took effect at the first split of all six regional leagues for the said year.

Bilibili Gaming won the second edition of FST, marking the organization's first international title and the LPL's first since the 2023 edition of MSI, and the end of the LCK's streak of six consecutive international titles since the 2023 World Championship. It was also the second international tournament to be held in Brazil after MSI 2017. Hanwha Life Esports won MSI 2026 on home soil in Daejeon, winning its second international title and LCK's 5th MSI title, tying the LPL for the most wins all-time. The 2026 League of Legends World Championship in the United States was won by Bilibili Gaming - the first World Championship for the LPL since 2021, and was the first time an international League of Legends competition was held in the state of Texas and the first finals to be staged on the East Coast of the United States in New York City.

In 2027, China will host the third First Stand Tournament dubbed as "First Stand: All In", while Valencia in Spain will host the 2027 Mid-Season Invitational. The 2027 League of Legends World Championship will be held in Japan and South Korea, the first international League of Legends competition to be held in Japan and South Korea's fourth hosting of the tournament.

Southeast Asia will host the 2028 First Stand Tournament.

== Tournaments ==
=== World Championship ===
The League of Legends World Championship is the season-ending tournament of the competitive League of Legends calendar. It is considered the most important tournament of the entire season, with its first edition being held in 2011 at DreamHack in Sweden. The tournament is considered one of the biggest esports events of the year, attracting millions of viewers in every edition. Bilibili Gaming of the LPL are the defending champions, having won the 2026 edition.

The next edition of Worlds will take place in 2027 in Nagoya, Japan, and in Suwon and Seoul, South Korea.

=== Mid-Season Invitational ===
The Mid-Season Invitational (MSI) is an annual League of Legends tournament hosted by publisher Riot Games since 2015. It is the second most important international League of Legends tournament aside from the World Championship. Hanwha Life Esports of the LCK are the defending champions, having won the 2026 edition.

The next edition of MSI will take place in 2027 in Valencia, Spain.

=== First Stand Tournament ===
The First Stand Tournament is third international tournament in the competitive League of Legends calendar. The inaugural edition took place on 10–16 March 2025 at LoL Park in Seoul, South Korea at the conclusion of the first split. This tournament utilizes Fearless Draft (which was popularized by China's LoL Development League), where Champions selected during a game cannot be selected again during the remainder of the series. Bilibili Gaming of the LPL are the defending champions, having won the 2026 edition.

The next two editions of First Stand will take place in 2027 in China, and in 2028 in Southeast Asia.

=== Regional leagues ===
On February 7, 2013, Riot Games created the League of Legends Championship Series (LCS), separate professional leagues for Europe and North America, where initially 8 teams would compete in a league structure similar to those found in other professional sports leagues (Particularly Liga MX and other Latin American association football leagues that have split seasons) with promotion and relegation with a second-tier Challengers Series; each LCS soon expanded to 10 teams to accommodate demand. In 2018, the NA LCS dropped promotion and relegation in favor of a franchising system similar to American professional sports leagues like the NFL; the European league followed suit in 2019. In late 2018, the European League of Legends Championship Series (EU LCS) was renamed to the League of Legends European Championship (LEC). The North American League of Legends Championship Series (NA LCS) also dropped "North American" from its name, and was renamed to simply the League Championship Series ahead of the 2019 season. In October 2024, the LCS would cease to exist and consolidate with regional leagues in Brazil and Latin America to form the Championship of The Americas (LTA).

Equivalent leagues, run by Riot and local publishers, also exist in other regions. This includes the Pro League (LPL) in China by Tencent, Champions Korea (LCK) in South Korea (Originally run by television channel Ongamenet (OGN) with its own group stage and knockout format before being run by Riot), and the Championship Pacific (LCP) run by Carry International.

The Continental League (LCL) in the Commonwealth of Independent States and Turkish Championship League (TCL) in Turkey were also separate leagues that qualified teams for major international events but have since become EMEA regional leagues within the LEC ecosystem, who qualify teams for EMEA Masters alongside other leagues from across Europe, the Middle East and Africa. Similarly, the Pacific Championship Series (PCS) in Taiwan/Hong Kong/Macau/Southeast Asia, Vietnam Championship Series (VCS) in Vietnam, Japan League (LJL) in Japan and the Circuit Oceania (LCO) by ESL Australia and Guinevere Capital also sent teams to Worlds but were consolidated into domestic leagues that can promote teams to the LCP; the LCO no longer exists as of 2024.

== Music ==
Music in League of Legends esports tournaments have been used to promote both regional and international competitions. Both the World Championship and the Mid-Season Invitational have had official songs to promote the tournament, with Worlds having a theme song since 2014 and MSI having official songs for the 2019, 2021, 2022, and 2023 editions.

In every best-of-5 series, whenever Game 5 is reached, a song known as "Silver Scrapes" is played. This tradition began during the 2012 World Championship, when it was played repeatedly whenever a technical delay occurred, and fans have since grown to enjoy the music. When the song plays, fans at the venue often wave their mobile phone flashlights to the melody. An orchestral version of the song was released before the 2025 World Championship knockout stages. It was recorded by the Hungarian Studio Orchestra at the Italian Institute in Budapest, Hungary.

World Championship songs

Year	Song	Performers	Writer(s) and producer(s)	Notes
2014	Warriors	Imagine Dragons	Imagine Dragons, Alex da Kid, Ben McKee, Josh Mosser, Daniel Platzman, Dan Reynolds, Wayne Sermon	Included in the band's deluxe version of its Smoke + Mirrors album in 2015.
2015	Worlds Collide	Nicki Taylor	Christian Linke, Sebastien Najand, Edouard Brenneisen, Jason Willey, Alexander Temple	
2016	Ignite	Zedd, Tim James	Zedd, Antonina Armato, Anton Zaslavski, Tim James, Thomas Armato Sturges	
2017	Legends Never Die	Against the Current	Riot Games Music Team, Alex Seaver, Justin Tranter, Oliver	A remix featuring Alan Walker was also released.
2018	Rise	The Glitch Mob, Mako, The Word Alive	Riot Games Music Team, Alex Seaver, The Glitch Mob	A remix featuring Bobby from IKON was also released.
2019	Phoenix	Chrissy Costanza, Cailin Russo	Riot Games Music Team, Alex Seaver, Stevie Aiello	
2020	Take Over	Jeremy McKinnon, Henry Lau, Max Schneider	Riot Games Music Team, Alex Seaver, Cal Scruby	
2021	Burn It All Down	PVRIS	Riot Games Music Team, Alex Seaver	
2022	Star Walkin'	Lil Nas X	Montero Hill, Omer Fedi, Henry Walter, Atia "Ink" Boggs	
2023	Gods	NewJeans	Alex Seaver, Sebastien Najand	
2024	Heavy Is the Crown	Linkin Park	Emily Armstrong, Colin Brittain, Brad Delson, Dave Farrell, Joe Hahn, Mike Shinoda, Mike Elizondo	Included in the band's eighth studio album From Zero, released in 2024. An abridged version of the song with newly-recorded vocals by Armstrong and Shinoda appears in the soundtrack for the second season of Arcane.
2025	Sacrifice	G.E.M.	Alex Seaver, Sebastien Najand, Jayson DeZuzio, Madalin Rosioru	
2026	Know My Name	True Damage (Coco Jones, Sofía Reyes, Soyeon, and Vic Mensa)		First time one of Riot's virtual artists performs a Worlds anthem.

== Hall of Legends ==
In January 2024, Riot Games announced the "Hall of Legends", a hall of fame that commemorates active and retired players once a year who have contributed to the game, whilst recognizing their achievements throughout their careers with a trophy and in-game items. The criteria for induction includes a player having played in tier-one leagues for five cumulative years, and a group of panelists deciding a players' induction based on their accolades in and out of the game. The first induction in 2024 to the hall was South Korea's Lee "Faker" Sang-hyeok, whilst China's Jian "Uzi" Zihao was the inductee in 2025. In 2026, Denmark's Rasmus "Caps" Winther became the first Western inductee into the Hall of Legends.

Inductee	Nationality	Year	Notable achievements	Ref.
Lee "Faker" Sang-hyeok	South Korea	2024	6× World champion (2013, 2015, 2016, 2023–2025); 2× Worlds MVP (2016, 2024); 2× MSI champion (2016, 2017); MSI MVP (2016); 10× LCK champion 2× LCK Season MVP; LCK Finals MVP; 2× Asian Games gold medalist (2022, 2026); Asian Games silver medalist (2018)	
Jian "Uzi" Zihao	China	2025	MSI champion (2018); MSI MVP (2018); 2× LPL champion LPL MVP of the Year; 2× LPL Playoffs MVP; Asian Games gold medalist (2018)	
Rasmus "Caps" Winther	Denmark	2026	MSI champion (2019); MSI MVP (2019); 1× TCL champion TCL Finals MVP; 18× LEC champion LEC Season MVP; 7× LEC Finals MVP; 3× LEC Split MVP	
