= Uzi (gamer) =

Chinese professional League of Legends player

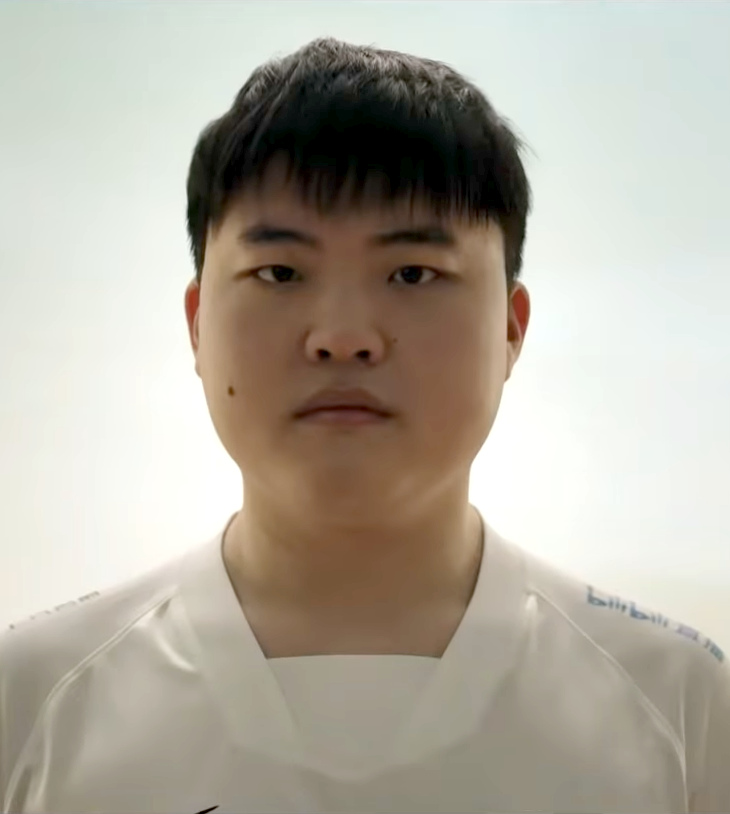
- Jian in 2022

Personal information
- Name: 简自豪 (Jian Zihao)
- Born: April 5, 1997 (age 29); Yichang, Hubei, China

Career information
- Game: League of Legends
- Playing career: 2012–2023
- Role: Bot Laner

Team history
- 2012–2014: Royal Club
- 2014: Star Horn Royal Club
- 2014–2015: OMG
- 2015–2016: Qiao Gu Reapers
- 2016: Newbee
- 2016–2020: Royal Never Give Up
- 2021–2022: Bilibili Gaming
- 2023: Edward Gaming

Career highlights and awards
- MSI champion (2018); MSI MVP (2018); 2× LPL champion; 2× LPL Playoffs MVP; LPL MVP of the Year (2014); 4× LPL Best ADC (2014, 2017, 2018, 2019); 2× LPL First All-Pro Team; 2× LPL Second All-Pro Team; LPL Third All-Pro Team; Rift Rivals champion (2018); 2× All-Star Invitational champion (2016, 2017)

Chinese name
- Traditional Chinese: 簡自豪
- Simplified Chinese: 简自豪
Transcriptions
Southern Min
- Hokkien POJ: Jiǎn Zìháo
Medal record
Esports
Representing China
Asian Games
Gold medal – first place	2018 Jakarta–Palembang	League of Legends

Jian Zihao (Chinese: 简自豪, born April 5, 1997), better known as Uzi, is a Chinese former professional League of Legends player. Renowned for his mechanical prowess and influence on the metagame, Uzi is widely regarded as one of the greatest bot laners in League of Legends history despite never winning a World Championship.

He was well known as the franchise player for Royal Never Give Up (RNG) and its predecessors, with whom he won two League of Legends Pro League (LPL) titles and played the World Championship six times, finishing as runner-up twice in 2013 and 2014. He won his first and only international title at the 2018 Mid-Season Invitational after defeating the LCK champions Kingzone DragonX. He also represented the Chinese national team at the 2018 Asian Games, earning a gold medal.

In 2025, he was inducted into the LoL Esports Hall of Legends alongside Faker as the second inductee.

== Professional career ==
Uzi began his professional career on the Chinese team Royal Club. Widely considered as one of the best AD carries during 2013, Uzi demonstrated his great mechanic prowess and carried his team to a second-place finish at the League of Legends World Championship. Despite their success at the Season 3 Worlds, the departure of Wong "Tabe" Pak Kan prompted Uzi to switch to the mid lane at the start of the 2014 season before returning to the AD carry role during the summer. Renamed to Star Horn Royal Club, Uzi rose to the challenge along with Korean imports Choi "inSec" In-seok and Yoon "zero" Kyung-sup and finished second at Worlds once again after a 1–3 series defeat against Samsung White. Following this, he left Star Horn Royal Club due to the communication problems with their imports.

The 2015 season proved to be a slump in Uzi's career after moving to OMG. Despite being touted as one of the biggest talent transfers of the offseason, OMG incurred difficulties integrating Uzi to the team, coupled with the declining performance of teammates Gao "Gogoing" Di-Ping and Yin "LoveLing" Le. Leading to 2016, Uzi was picked up by Qiao Gu Reapers. QG was invited to the IEM World Championship in March 2016 where they beat Fnatic in their first match but were subsequently eliminated in the group stage following a loss to SK Telecom T1 and then losing to Fnatic 1–2.

In May 2016, Qiao Gu Reapers was acquired by Newbee. However, four days later Uzi's contract was bought out by RNG. Jumping back to his debuting team, Uzi led RNG to the 2016 World Championship quarterfinals where they were defeated again by SK Telecom T1.

After a successful four-year tenure with RNG, Uzi announced his first retirement from professional play on Weibo in June 2020, due to personal health issues. He stated that he had developed type-2 diabetes as "a result of staying up late for years, a fatty diet and being under insurmountable stress" and that his mental state was "not as good as it was before". In an effort to recover, he took medication and made changes to his work schedule and exercise habits, but his situation did not change. His doctor told him there could be "serious complications" if he continued playing competitively.

Following a brief stint with Bilibili Gaming between 2021 and 2022, he went on to sign with Edward Gaming in June 2023 to play competitively again during the summer split. However, the team ended up at 5th-6th place at playoffs and failed to qualify for Worlds through the LPL Regional Finals. In November 2023, Uzi announced his final retirement on stream, stating that he felt defeated by reality, and that he had lost the desire to play competitively.

== National team career ==
Uzi represented China in the League of Legends demonstration event at the 2018 Asian Games. The tournament took place at BritAma Arena at Mahaka Square in Jakarta, Indonesia, from August 27 to 29, 2018. The Chinese team earned a gold medal after a 3–1 win to South Korea in the finals.

== Legacy ==
Riot Games announced on May 19, 2025, that Uzi was chosen as their second entry into the Hall of Legends, an honor reserved for the most legendary players in League of Legends esports history.

He was officially inducted in a private ceremony in Shanghai, China on June 6, 2025. A documentary on his career was released on June 11, 2025, in partnership with Mercedes-Benz.

== Seasons overview ==
Year	Team	Domestic			Regional	International	
Year	Team	League	Split		Rift Rivals	Mid-Season Invitational	World Championship
Year	Team	League	Spring	Summer	Rift Rivals	Mid-Season Invitational	World Championship
2013	Royal Club	LPL	5th	4th	—N/a	—N/a	2nd
2014	Royal Club	LPL	6th	—N/a	—N/a	—N/a	—N/a
2014	Star Horn Royal Club	LPL	—N/a	3rd	—N/a	—N/a	2nd
2015	OMG	LPL	5th-8th	7th	—N/a	Did not qualify	
2016	Qiao Gu Reapers	LPL	4th	—N/a	—N/a	Did not qualify	—N/a
2016	Royal Never Give Up	LPL	—N/a	2nd	—N/a	—N/a	5th-8th
2017	Royal Never Give Up	LPL	2nd	2nd	Did not play	Did not qualify	3rd-4th
2018	Royal Never Give Up	LPL	1st	1st	1st	1st	5th-8th
2019	Royal Never Give Up	LPL	5th-6th	2nd	Did not qualify		9th-12th
2022	Bilibili Gaming	LPL	7th-8th	—N/a	—N/a	Did not qualify	—N/a
2023	Edward Gaming	LPL	—N/a	5th-6th	—N/a	—N/a	Did not qualify

== Awards and honors ==
International

- One-time Mid-Season Invitational champion – 2018
- One-time Mid-Season Invitational Finals MVP – 2018

Regional

- One-time Rift Rivals champion – 2018

LPL

- Two-time LPL champion – Spring 2018, Summer 2018
- Two-time LPL Playoffs MVP – Spring 2018, Summer 2018
- One-time LPL MVP of the Year – 2014
- Four-time LPL Best ADC – 2014, 2017, 2018, 2019
- Two-time LPL Most Popular Player – 2016, 2017
- Two-time LPL First All-Pro Team – Spring 2017, Spring 2018
- Two-time LPL Second All-Pro Team – Summer 2018, Summer 2019
- One-time LPL Third All-Pro Team – Spring 2019
- Top 10 Greatest Players of the LPL – 2023

Chinese national team

- Asian Games gold medal winner – 2018

Halls of Fame

- LoL Esports Hall of Legends inductee – 2025

Media

- Weibo Person of the Year – 2019
