= 2018 Mid-Season Invitational =

League of Legends tournament

Tournament information
- Sport: League of Legends
- Location: Germany; France
- Dates: 3 May–20 May
- Administrator: Riot Games
- Venue: EU LCS Studio (Berlin, Play-in stage & Main Group stage); Zénith Paris (Paris, Main Playoffs Stage)
- Teams: 14

Final positions
- Champions: Royal Never Give Up
- Runner-up: Kingzone DragonX
- MVP: Jian "Uzi" Zihao (Royal Never Give Up)

The 2018 Mid-Season Invitational was the fourth edition of the Mid-Season Invitational, a Riot Games-organised tournament for League of Legends, the multiplayer online battle arena video game. The tournament is the culmination of the 2018 spring split, the first part of 8th season of the game competitive scene.

Each of 14 premier League of Legends leagues have a team representing them; Europe (EU LCS), South Korea (LCK), North America (NA LCS) and China (LPL) had their teams automatically admitted into the main event whereas the other 10 leagues will compete among each other in a "play-in" with the top 2 teams advancing to join the main event.

The tournament was hosted in Germany and France from 3 to 20 May 2018. Matches of the play-in and group stages were held in EU LCS Studio in Berlin, while playoffs took place in multi-purpose indoor arena Zénith Paris. Royal Never Give Up are the champions of the 2018 MSI, after taking down Kingzone DragonX in the finals. Jian "Uzi" Zihao was named the MVP of the entire tournament, due to his outstanding performances. The results of the tournament have received numerous international debates and reactions.

The event's finals, where LPL (China)'s Royal Never Give Up took on LCK (South Korea)'s Kingzone DragonX, became one of the most watched eSports matches in history, greatly attributed to China's viewership. The finals were watched by over 127 million unique viewers, while the entire event boasted a total viewing time of over 2 billion hours. The event also became one of the greatest League of Legends' tournaments in history, as well as one of its historical milestones, as a South Korean team was thwarted by a non-South Korean team in a major match for the first time in 3 years.

== Qualified teams ==
Last year, team from Vietnam had qualified for MSI via Southeast Asian league. From 2018, Vietnam region will be separated from Southeast Asia region. The Spring split Champion team from Vietnamese league will qualify for MSI without take part in the Southeast Asian league. Number of regions up to 14.

Based on the result of the MSI and World Championship in 2 years before (2016–2017), 4 teams from Europe (EU LCS), North America (NA LCS), South Korea (LCK), and China (LPL) are started in Main Group Stage, 2 teams from Taiwan/Hong Kong/Macau (LMS) and Vietnam (VCS) are started in Play-in round 2, 10 remaining teams are started in Play-in round 1. Unlike last year, loser at round 2 will be eliminated because there's no round 3 in Play-in Stage.

| Region | League | Teams | ID |
Start in Main event's Group stage
| China | LPL | Royal Never Give Up | RNG |
| Europe | EU LCS | Fnatic | FNC |
| North America | NA LCS | Team Liquid | TL |
| South Korea | LCK | Kingzone DragonX | KZ |
Start in 2nd play-in round
| TW/HK/MO | LMS | Flash Wolves | FW |
| Vietnam | VCS | EVOS Esports | EVS |
Start in 1st play-in round
| Brazil | CBLOL | KaBuM! e-Sports | KBM |
| CIS | LCL | Gambit Esports | GMB |
| Japan | LJL | Pentagram | PGM |
| Latin America North | LLN | Rainbow7 | R7 |
| Latin America South | CLS | Kaos Latin Gamers | KLG |
| Oceania | OPL | Dire Wolves | DW |
| Southeast Asia | GPL | Ascension Gaming | ASC |
| Turkey | TCL | SuperMassive e-Sports | SUP |

== Venues ==
Berlin, Paris were the two cities chosen to host the competition.

| Berlin, Germany | Paris, France |
|---|---|
| Play-in Stage & Main Group Stage | Playoffs Stage |
| EU LCS Studio | Zénith Paris |
| Capacity: 174 | Capacity: 9,000 |
| 2018 Mid-Season Invitational is located in Germany | 2018 Mid-Season Invitational is located in France |

== Play-In Stage ==
=== Groups ===
First place teams of each group advance to round 2 of the stage

Group A

| Pos | Team | Pld | W | L | PCT | Qualification |
|---|---|---|---|---|---|---|
| 1 | Gambit Esports | 6 | 5 | 1 | 0.833 | Advance to Play-In Knockouts |
| 2 | Rainbow7 | 6 | 3 | 3 | 0.500 | |
| 3 | Kaos Latin Gamers | 6 | 2 | 4 | 0.333 | |
| 4 | Ascension Gaming | 6 | 2 | 4 | 0.333 | |

Source: LoL Esports

Group B

| Pos | Team | Pld | W | L | PCT | Qualification |
|---|---|---|---|---|---|---|
| 1 | Bahçeşehir SuperMassive | 6 | 5 | 1 | 0.833 | Advance to Play-In Knockouts |
| 2 | KaBuM! e-Sports | 6 | 4 | 2 | 0.667 | |
| 3 | Dire Wolves | 6 | 2 | 4 | 0.333 | |
| 4 | PENTAGRAM | 6 | 1 | 5 | 0.167 | |

Source: LoL Esports

=== Knockouts ===
Random draw. Winners of the series advance to group stage. Losers will be eliminated.

As the highest ranking emerging region in the 2018 Mid-Season Invitational, Vietnam (VCS) was given a direct spot in the main event at the 2018 World Championship, which was awarded to their summer champions.

Semifinals
Winner to Group Stage
1 | EVOS Esports | 3
2 | SuperMassive eSports | 1
Winner to Group Stage
1 | Flash Wolves | 3
2 | Gambit eSports | 0

== Group stage ==
Double Round Robin. Top 4 teams advance to Knock-out stage.

China, Europe, South Korea and TW/HK/MO will get pool 1 in 2018 World Championship Main Group Stage for Summer split Champion. North America and Vietnam will get pool 2.

| Pos | Team | Pld | W | L | PCT | Qualification |
|---|---|---|---|---|---|---|
| 1 | Royal Never Give Up | 11 | 8 | 3 | 0.727 | Advance to Knockout Stage |
| 2 | Flash Wolves | 11 | 7 | 4 | 0.636 | Advance to Knockout Stage |
| 3 | King-Zone DragonX | 10 | 6 | 4 | 0.600 | Advance to Knockout Stage |
| 4 | Fnatic | 11 | 5 | 6 | 0.455 | Advance to Knockout Stage |
| 5 | Team Liquid | 11 | 4 | 7 | 0.364 | |
| 6 | EVOS Esports | 10 | 2 | 8 | 0.200 | |

Source: LoL Esports

== Knockout stage ==
- 1st place team of Group Stage chooses between 3rd and 4th place to be their semifinal opponent (RNG chose FNC)
- Matches are best of five

Semifinals
1 | Royal Never Give Up | 3
4 | Fnatic | 0
2 | Flash Wolves | 1
3 | King-Zone DragonX | 3

Final
Royal Never Give Up | 3
King-Zone DragonX | 1

=== Semifinals ===
| Semifinals | May 18 | Royal Never Give Up | 3 | – | 0 | Fnatic | Paris, France |
| | 11:00 UTC | Recap | | | | | Zénith Paris |
| | | 1 | Game 1 | | | 0 | |
| | | 1 | Game 2 | | | 0 | |
| | | 1 | Game 3 | | | 0 | |

| Semifinals | May 19 | Flash Wolves | 1 | – | 3 | King-Zone DragonX | Paris, France |
| | 11:00 UTC | Recap | | | | | Zénith Paris |
| | | 0 | Game 1 | | | 1 | |
| | | 1 | Game 2 | | | 0 | |
| | | 0 | Game 3 | | | 1 | |
| | | 0 | Game 4 | | | 1 | |

=== Finals ===
| Final | May 20 | Royal Never Give Up | 3 | – | 1 | King-Zone DragonX | Paris, France |
| | 11:00 UTC | Recap | | | | | Zénith Paris |
| | | 1 | Game 1 | | | 0 | |
| | | 0 | Game 2 | | | 1 | |
| | | 1 | Game 3 | | | 0 | |
| | | 1 | Game 4 | | | 0 | |

== Ranking ==
| Place | League | Teams | PS1 | PS2 | GS | SF | Final |
|---|---|---|---|---|---|---|---|
| 1st | LPL | Royal Never Give Up | | | 7–3 | 3–0 | 3–1 |
| 2nd | LCK | King-Zone DragonX | | | 6–4 | 3–1 | 1–3 |
| 3rd–4th | LMS | Flash Wolves | | 3–0 | 7–3 | 1–3 | |
| 3rd–4th | EU LCS | Fnatic | | | 4–6 | 0–3 | |
| 5th | NA LCS | Team Liquid | | | 4–6 | | |
| 6th | VCS | EVOS Esports | | 3–1 | 2–8 | | |
| 7th–8th | TCL | SuperMassive e-Sports | 5–1 | 1–3 | | | |
| 7th–8th | LCL | Gambit Esports | 5–1 | 0–3 | | | |
| 9th–10th | CBLOL | KaBuM! e-Sports | 4–2 | | | | |
| 9th–10th | LLN | Rainbow7 | 3–3 | | | | |
| 11th | OPL | Dire Wolves | 2–4 | | | | |
| 12th–13th | CLS | Kaos Latin Gamers | 2–4 | | | | |
| 12th–13th | GPL | Ascension Gaming | 2–4 | | | | |
| 14th | LJL | PENTAGRAM | 1–5 | | | | |
