= Slate Esports =

Singaporean esports organization

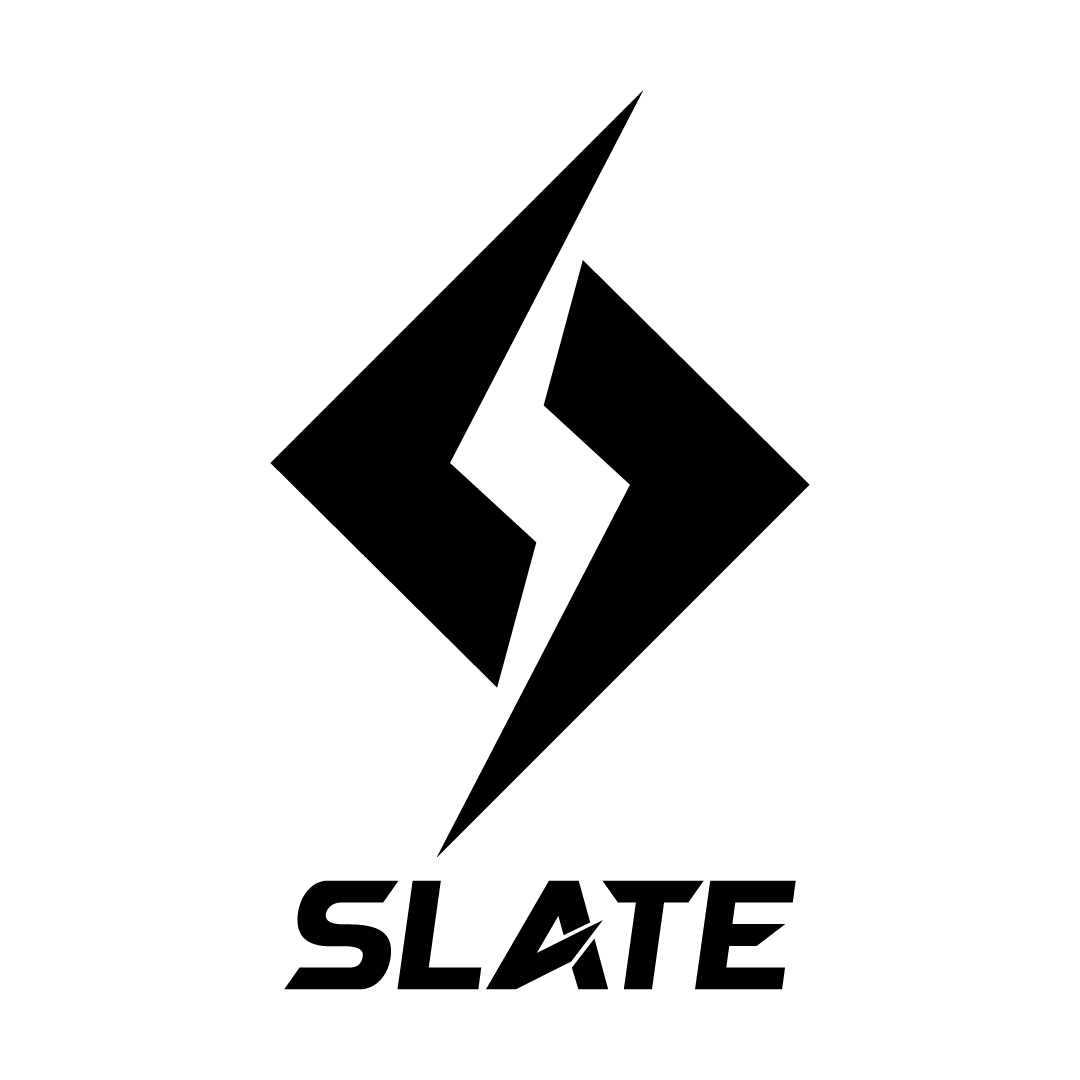
- Short name: SLT
- Divisions: Mobile Legends: Bang Bang
- Founded: 27 August 2022
- Based in: Singapore
- Location: Southeast Asia
- Colours: Black; White
- Owner: Akihiro ‘JPL’ Furusawa; Daryl ‘Youngin” Ng
- Manager: ScoutJLY
- Division titles: MPL-SG S4 2nd Place
- Main sponsor: The Alley; The Gym
- Website: twitter.com/AviumEsports

Slate Esports (abbreviated as SLT) is a Singaporean esports organization under Avium Esports. It has competitive team in Mobile Legends: Bang Bang. Slate Esports consists of former members of EVOS SG, who competed in M3 and achieved top 4 in global standings.

== Mobile Legends: Bang Bang ==
=== MPL Singapore ===
==== Season 4 ====
Previously known as EVOS SG, Slate lineup included Adammir, Gear, JPLand Seilah. Joxx and Nick were replaced by FMM and Jae. The team went on to place 2nd in the Regular Season. They subsequently finished 2nd in the Playoffs, after a 3-4 defeat to rivals RSG SG.

== Roster ==
SLT Mobile Legends: Bang Bang roster
Players
Coaches

Role	Handle	Name	Nationality
Jungler	Adammir	Adam Chong	Singapore
Offlane	Gear	Tristan Christopher Nathanael	Singapore
Mid Lane	Seilah	Basil Lim Dao Ze	Singapore
Roam	JPL	Akihiro Furusawa	Singapore
Gold Lane	FMM	Ng Bi De	Singapore
Offlane	Jae	Jaeden Tan	Singapore

Head coach

Daryl Ng "Youngin" Jun Da

Legend:
- (I) Inactive
- (S) Suspended
- Substitute
- (injured) Injury / Illness

Latest roster transaction: 27 August 2022.

== Tournament results ==
=== Mobile Legends: Bang Bang Professional League (MPL) ===
Years	Event	Season	Pl.	Last match	Result
2022	MPL Singapore	Season 4	SLT vs. RSG SG	3–4	2nd
