= Ankur (given name) =

Ankur is an Indian masculine given name:

== Athletes ==
- Ankur Diwakar (born 1991), Indian eSports athlete
- Ankur Julka (born 1987), Indian cricketer
- Ankur Mittal (born 1992), Indian shooter
- Ankur Poseria (born 1987), American swimmer
- Ankur Vasishta (born 1982), Hong Kong cricketer

== Entrepreneurs ==
- Ankur Jain (born c. 1990), American entrepreneur

== Actors ==
- Ankur Bhatia (born 1982), Indian actor
- Ankur Nayyar (born 1967), Indian actor
- Ankur Vikal, Indian actor

== Other ==
- Ankur Betageri (born 1983), Indian poet/writer
- Ankur Sharma, Indian politician

== See also ==
- Ankur (disambiguation)
