= 2018 Spring Vietnam Championship Series =

League of Legends League

2018 VCS Spring
- 2018

Tournament information
- Sport: League of Legends
- Dates: 18 January–7 April
- Administrator: Garena Vietnam
- Host: Vietnam
- Teams: 8

Final positions
- Champions: EVOS Esports
- Runner-up: GIGABYTE Marines

The 2018 Vietnam Championship Series Spring Season was the first split of the sixth season of Vietnam's fully professional League of Legends league. Eight teams competed in a round robin group stage, with the top four teams continuing to offline playoffs.

On 21st February 2018, it was announced that Vietnam was now an independent competitive region and would no longer participate in the Garena Premier League.

== Format ==
- 8 teams participate

- 6 teams from 2017 VCS A Summer
- 2 teams from Spring Promotion

- Group Stage

- 7 weeks, League play
- Double Round Robin
- Each match is best of three
- Advancement:

- Top 4 teams advance to the playoffs.
- Bottom 2 teams drop to 2018 Summer Promotion.
- Each team has 10 players who can be registered in the team's line-up at the same time.

- Playoffs

- Top four teams from Spring Season participate
- King of the Hill single elimination bracket
- Matches are best of five
- Winner qualifies for the 2018 Mid-Season Invitational

== Participants ==
Team(s)	ID
(Vietnam) Cherry Esports	CR
(Vietnam) EVOS Esports	EVS
(Vietnam) Hall of Fame	HoL
(Vietnam) Friends Forever Gaming	FFQ
(Vietnam) GIGABYTE Marines	GAM
(Vietnam) FTV Esports	FTV
(Vietnam) Young Generation	YG
(Vietnam) Ultimate	UTM

=== Rosters ===
Teams	Players					
Teams	Top	Jungle	Mid	ADC	Support	Coach
Cherry Esports	(Vietnam) Boong (Vietnam) Rika (Vietnam) Ikaros	(Vietnam) Potm	(Vietnam) Artifact	(Vietnam) Clear	(Vietnam) Kidz	(Vietnam) BaRoiBeo
EVOS Esports	(Vietnam) Stark	(Vietnam) YiJin	(Vietnam) Warzone (Vietnam) Beyond	(Vietnam) Slay	(Vietnam) RonOP	(Vietnam) Violet
GIGABYTE Marines	(Vietnam) Zeros (Vietnam) Nevan	(Vietnam) KrissKyle (Vietnam) Sena (Vietnam) Ciel	(Vietnam) Zeroday (Vietnam) Petland	(Vietnam) Noway	(Vietnam) Sya (Vietnam) Archie	(Vietnam) Tinikun
Friends Forever	(Vietnam) KingJ (Vietnam) SunSieu	(Vietnam) Haeven (Vietnam) Sena (Vietnam) DNK	(Vietnam) Lies (Vietnam) QTV (Vietnam) ChiChi	(Vietnam) Celebrity	(Vietnam) Sergh	(Vietnam) Junie
FTV Esports	(Vietnam) Taurus (Vietnam) SunSieu	(Vietnam) Knight	(Vietnam) Victory	(Vietnam) Slayder	(Vietnam) Akeno	
Ultimate	(Vietnam) Calm	(Vietnam) Spot	(Vietnam) BlazeS	(Vietnam) Zin	(Vietnam) CBL (Vietnam) Tear	(Vietnam) Hope
Young Generation	(Vietnam) Ren (Vietnam) yT	(Vietnam) Venus	(Vietnam) Naul	(Vietnam) Bigkoro	(Vietnam) Palette	
Hall of Fame	(Vietnam) LL	(Vietnam) Sorn (Vietnam) Xuhao	(Vietnam) Pake	(Vietnam) Minas (Vietnam) EasyLove	(Vietnam) Shaoran (Vietnam) Bie	(Vietnam) Greentea

== Results ==
=== Group stage ===
- 30 March - 7 April
- Round robin format.

#	Team	~	EVS	UTM	GAM	YG	CR	FTV	FFQ	HoL	W	L	±
1	EVOS Esports	EVS	~	2−0	2−0	1−1	1−1	2−0	2−0	2−0	12	2	+10
2	Ultimate	UTM	0−2	~	1−1	1−1	2−0	2−0	1−1	2−0	9	5	+4
3	GIGABYTE Marines	GAM	0−2	1−1	~	1−1	1−1	2−0	2−0	2−0	9	5	+4
4	Young Generation	YG	1−1	1−1	1−1	~	1−1	2−0	1−1	1−1	8	6	+2
5	Cherry Esports	CR	1−1	0−2	1−1	1−1	~	0−2	2−0	2−0	7	7	+0
6	FTV Esports	FTV	0−2	0−2	0−2	0−2	2−0	~	1−1	2−0	5	9	−4
7	Friends Forever Gaming	FFQ	0−2	1−1	0−2	1−1	0−2	1−1	~	2−0	5	9	−4
8	Hall of Fame	HoL	0−2	0−2	0−2	1−1	0−2	0−2	0−2	~	1	13	−12

=== Playoffs ===
- 9 August - 13 August
Rosters

Teams	Players					
Teams	Top	Jungle	Mid	ADC	Support	Coach
GIGABYTE Marines	(Vietnam) Zeros	(Vietnam) KrissKyle	(Vietnam) Zeroday	(Vietnam) Noway	(Vietnam) Archie	(Vietnam) Tinikun
EVOS Esports	(Vietnam) Stark	(Vietnam) YiJin	(Vietnam) Warzone	(Vietnam) Slay	(Vietnam) RonOP	(Vietnam) Violet
Young Generation	(Vietnam) Ren (Vietnam) yT	(Vietnam) Venus	(Vietnam) Naul	(Vietnam) Bigkoro	(Vietnam) Palette	(Vietnam) JackieWind
Ultimate	(Vietnam) Calm	(Vietnam) Spot	(Vietnam) Blazes	(Vietnam) Zin	(Vietnam) Tear	(Vietnam) Hope

Results

Round 1
3	Young Generation	1
4	GIGABYTE Marines	3

Round 2
2	Ultimate	1
GIGABYTE Marines	3

Finals
1	EVOS Esports	3
GIGABYTE Marines	2

== Final standings ==
₫ 800,000,000 Vietnamese Dong are spread among the teams as seen below:

Place	Prize	Team	Qualification
1st	₫500,000,000	EVOS Esports	2018 MSI Play-in; 2018 Rift Rivals
2nd	₫200,000,000	GIGABYTE Marines	2018 Rift Rivals
3rd	₫150,000,000	Ultimate	2018 Rift Rivals
4th	₫125,000,000	Young Generation	
5th	₫100,000,000	Cherry Esports	
6th	₫85,000,000	FTV Esports	
7th	₫75,000,000	Friends Forever	Summer Promotion
8th	₫65,000,000	Hall of Fame	Summer Promotion
