= First Stand Tournament =

Esports tournament

- Upcoming season or competition: 2027 First Stand Tournament
- Game: League of Legends
- Founded: March 10, 2025; 20 months ago
- Administrator: Riot Games
- No. of teams: 8 teams (2026)
- Venue: Rotating locations (most recent location: Brazil)
- Most recent champion: Bilibili Gaming (2026)
- Qualification: Regional leagues (list)
- Related competitions: Mid-Season Invitational; World Championship
- Website: lolesports.com

The First Stand Tournament (FST, also simply as First Stand) is an annual League of Legends international tournament hosted by Riot Games at the conclusion of the first of three splits of the game's professional esports scene. It is the third international tournament under the new split structure and competitive calendar by Riot Games since 2025.

== History ==
=== 2025 ===
On 11 June 2024, Riot Games announced the creation of a new split structure and competitive calendar for the League of Legends esports scene, including a three-split calendar similar to that of the League of Legends EMEA Championship (LEC) to be applied to all major regions and the creation of a new international tournament to conclude the first split. During the media day for the 2024 League of Legends World Championship Final at The O2 Arena in London, United Kingdom on 1 November 2024, Riot Games announced that the new international tournament would be named "First Stand Tournament" (FST), with the inaugural edition set to take place from 10 to 16 March 2025 in Seoul, South Korea.

Hanwha Life Esports of the League of Legends Champions Korea (LCK) won the tournament by defeating League of Legends EMEA Championship (LEC) representatives Karmine Corp with a score 3–1, marking the organization's first international title.

=== 2026 ===
In November 2025, Riot Games announced that FST 2026 would take place from 16–22 March 2026, in São Paulo, Brazil. It will be the second international League of Legends competition to be hosted in Latin America after the 2017 Mid-Season Invitational, which was also held in Brazil. Differing from last year, the format is set to involve two double-elimination groups and a single-elimination knockout stage. All series will be best-of-five.

Bilibili Gaming of the League of Legends Pro League (LPL) won the tournament by defeating League of Legends EMEA Championship (LEC) representatives G2 Esports with a score 3–1, marking the organization's first international title.

=== First Stand: All In (2027) ===
The same video that announced the hosts of the 2026 edition of the tournament also announced that FST in 2027 would be hosted in Southeast Asia (including Taiwan), which will be the first time an international League of Legends tournament would be hosted in the region since Vietnam and Taiwan's hosting of the 2019 Mid-Season Invitational. However, in November 2026, Riot Games announced a special edition of the tournament for 2027, entitled "First Stand: All In", which would be held in China. First Stand: All In is slated to be the biggest esports tournament produced by Riot.

=== 2028 ===
As a result of First Stand: All In being held in China for 2027, Southeast Asia would instead be announced to host the 2028 First Stand Tournament.

== Format and Qualification ==
As of 2026, the tournament features eight qualified teams, including the winners of the first competitive split from the League of Legends Champions Korea (LCK), League of Legends Pro League (LPL), League of Legends EMEA Championship (LEC), League Championship Series (LCS), Campeonato Brasileiro de League of Legends (CBLOL), and the League of Legends Championship Pacific (LCP). The following is a breakdown of the qualified teams per region:

- LCK: LCK Cup finalists
- LPL: Split 1 finalists
- LEC: LEC Versus winners
- LCS: Lock-In champions
- CBLOL: CBLOL Cup champions
- LCP: Season Kickoff Qualifying Series Winner

In each series played in the tournament, the "Fearless Draft" format is implemented. Fearless Draft pertains to a draft format in League of Legends popularized by China's LoL Development League where teams cannot pick a champion that they've already played in a series. For instance, when one team picks a champion in any stage of the series, they and their opponents may not pick said champion for the succeeding games. Hence, for every game of a best-of series, there will be ten additional bans, narrowing teams' champion pools.

== Results ==
=== By year ===
Year	Final location	Final				No.
Year	Final location	Champion	Score		Runner-up	No.
2025	Seoul	Hanwha Life Esports	3	1	Karmine Corp	5
2026	São Paulo	Bilibili Gaming	3	1	G2 Esports	8
2027	TBA, China					
2028	TBA, Southeast Asia					

=== By region ===
Region	Titles	Runner-up	Total
South Korea (LCK)	1	0	1
China (LPL)	1	0	1
EMEA (LEC)	0	2	2

=== By team ===
Team	League	Titles	Runner-up	Total
Hanwha Life Esports	LCK	1	0	1
Bilibili Gaming	LPL	1	0	1
Karmine Corp	LEC	0	1	1
G2 Esports	LEC	0	1	1
