= 2028 First Stand Tournament =

League of Legends esports tournament

Tournament information
- Sport: League of Legends
- Location: Southeast Asia
- Administrator: Riot Games

The 2028 First Stand Tournament will be the fourth edition of the First Stand Tournament (FST) – a League of Legends tournament organized by publisher Riot Games organized in the first third of the competitive calendar. The tournament will be held in Southeast Asia.

It will be the third international League of Legends competition to be staged in Southeast Asia (including Taiwan) after the 2014 League of Legends World Championship and the 2019 Mid-Season Invitational.

== Host selection ==
In a development update video published by Riot Games on 8 January 2025 to begin that year's competitive season, Riot Games initially announced that Southeast Asia would host the 2027 edition of First Stand.

During the media day for the 2026 League of Legends World Championship Final in New York City, United States, on 13 November 2026, Riot Games pushed back Southeast Asia's hosting to 2028, following its announcement of a one-time expanded tournament for the 2027 edition, with China acquiring hosting rights.

No specific country or location has been announced for the tournament.

== Qualification ==
The Campeonato Brasileiro de League of Legends (CBLOL), League of Legends Champions Korea (LCK), League of Legends Championship Pacific (LCP), League Championship Series (LCS), League of Legends EMEA Championship (LEC), and League of Legends Pro League (LPL) will send qualified teams each.
