= Ankur =

Ankur may refer to:

- Ankur (film), a 1974 Indian Hindi-language film by Shyam Benegal
- Ankur (food), edible sprouts
- Ankur (name), an Indian given name
- Ankuram, 1993 Indian film
- Anguram 1982 Indian film
