= Garudaku =

Company of Indonesia

- Type: Private
- Industry: Game, esports
- Founded: November 27, 2021 (age 4)
- Headquarters: Jakarta, Indonesia
- Area served: Indonesia
- Website: www.garudaku.com

Garudaku is the official platform of the Indonesian Esports Association (PBESI) to support the growth of the esports ecosystem in Indonesia. The platform was established to serve as a hub connecting athletes, teams, coaches, and other stakeholders within the Indonesian esports industry, as well as a tool to promote and enhance professional standards in esports.

Garudaku provides services such as game voucher top-ups, organizes official Esports leagues, and offers extracurricular and student activity units (UKM) in schools and universities across Indonesia.

== History ==
Garudaku was launched by PBESI as part of an initiative to strengthen the foundation of esports in Indonesia. Through this platform, PBESI aims to provide comprehensive facilities for the esports community, ranging from amateur to professional players, and to ensure that all esports activities in Indonesia are conducted according to international standards.

== IESF World Esports Championship 2022 ==
The IESF World Esports Championship 2022 was held in Bali, Indonesia, with the main event taking place from December 2 to 11, 2022. This was the 14th edition of the annual tournament organized by the International Esports Federation (IESF). The championship's theme, "Unity in Diversity," aligns with Indonesia's national motto, "Bhinneka Tunggal Ika" ("Unity in Diversity"). The tournament was attended by more than one million esports athletes from 120 countries, divided into five major regions: Oceania, Europe, Asia, Pan America, and Africa. Six games were contested in the event: Tekken 7, DOTA 2, Mobile Legends: Bang Bang, PUBG Mobile, eFootball 2022, and Counter-Strike: Global Offensive. The total prize pool for the championship was US$500,000.

== Esports leagues ==
As part of its efforts to develop the national esports ecosystem, Garudaku functions as the coordinating center and organizer of various officially recognized esports tournaments and leagues in Indonesia, from amateur to professional levels.

=== National Esports League ===
The National Esports League is an open esports competition organized by the Indonesian Esports Association (PB ESI) through the official Garudaku.com platform. The National Esports League is an open league held by the Indonesian Esports Association (PB ESI) and Garudaku to achieve the highest achievements in the country's esports scene.

The National Esports League system consists of several tiers, starting from League 3, League 2, and League 1 National Esports. PB ESI and Garudaku will also regulate all forms of competition, including format, timeline, and league participants. The National Esports League system has a hierarchical format with promotions and relegations. Successful teams in the league can move higher up in the pyramid, while those at the bottom may be relegated to lower levels. The 2023 National Esports League was won by the team Pajajaran Esports Bogor. The 2024 National Esports League was held in Jakarta.

=== National Student Esports League ===
The National Student Esports League is an esports competition organized by the Indonesian Esports Association (PB ESI) through the official Garudaku platform. This league is specifically designed for students across Indonesia, aiming to develop esports talent from an early age and promote esports as a positive and constructive extracurricular activity among students.

This league is part of PBESI's initiative to strengthen the foundation of esports at the grassroots level and prepare the younger generation for careers in esports. The competition also aims to enhance the recognition of esports as a positive sporting activity and integrate esports into extracurricular activities in schools across Indonesia. The 2024 National Student Esports League was attended by more than 3,000 teams from various schools in Indonesia.

== See also ==
- Komite Olahraga Nasional Indonesia
