= 2018 League of Legends World Championship =

Esports tournament

League of Legends World Championship
- 2018

Tournament information
- Location: South Korea
- Dates: October 1–November 3
- Tournament format(s): 12 team double round-robin play-in stage 16 team double round-robin group stage 8 team single-elimination bracket
- Venues: 4 (in 4 host cities): Seoul (play-in stage); Busan (group stage & quarterfinals); Gwangju (semifinals); Incheon (finals)
- Teams: 24
- Purse: $6.450.000

Final positions
- Champion: Invictus Gaming
- Runner-up: Fnatic

Tournament statistics
- Attendance: Peak viewership: 43.997.815
- MVP: Gao "Ning" Zhenning (Invictus Gaming)

The 2018 League of Legends World Championship was an esports tournament for the multiplayer online battle arena video game League of Legends. It was the eighth iteration of the League of Legends World Championship, an annual international tournament organized by the game's developer, Riot Games. It was held from October 1 to November 3, 2018, in cities across South Korea. Twenty four teams qualified for the tournament based on their placement in regional circuits such as those in China, South Korea, Europe, and North America, with twelve of those teams having to reach the group stage via a play-in round. The tournament became known for its very surprising results, numerous upsets, and has often been considered the most unpredictable worlds in League of Legends' history. The tournament also became the most watched esports event in history, reaching a peak of over 200 million concurrent viewers during the finals. It surpassed the viewership of the 2017 League of Legends World Championship, as well as the peak viewership of numerous worldwide sporting events including the Super Bowl.

The tournament's opening ceremony received significant attention, with over 90 million concurrent viewers tuning in for the performance. A virtual K-pop group named K/DA was unveiled by Riot Games during the ceremony, with Soyeon and Miyeon from (G)I-dle, Madison Beer and Jaira Burns representing the group as its human counterpart and in the live performance of the finals. K/DA topped global music charts after the initial release of their debut song "Pop/Stars", receiving considerable attention online and raking in one of the fastest viewership records for its music video on YouTube. A dance practice video of "Pop/Stars", as popular in the K-pop scene, was also released. "RISE" is the tournament's theme song, put together by The Glitch Mob, Mako and The Word Alive. A remix version of "RISE" featuring Bobby from IKON was also released shortly after, with the song being performed on the tournament's finals by all the involved music groups and artists. The song would be performed again when Korea hosted the tournament for the second time in 2023.

The victory of China's Invictus Gaming over Europe's Fnatic in the tournament's finals marked the first time in League of Legends history that the LPL (China) as a region won the world championship, as well as the first time a non-LCK (Korean) team has won after five consecutive years of prior Korean winners. The final series is also the fastest world championship finals in history at 85 minutes total game time. Gao “Ning” Zhenning was awarded the MVP of the finals due to his outstanding performance and contributions during the series, marking the first time a jungle position player has won a world championship MVP.

== Qualified teams ==
Although the South Korea (LCK) representative, Kingzone DragonX, lost to China's (LPL) representative Royal Never Give Up (LPL) in 2018 Mid-Season Invitational (MSI) Finals, all three teams from South Korea (LCK) started in the Main Group Stage, having won the 2017 Mid-Season Invitational and the previous two World Championships. With the results of 2018 MSI and following their separation from the rest of the Southeast Asian (SEA) region, Vietnam (VCS) had a direct seed into the Main Group Stage for the summer split victor in their region, but unlike the previous year, Vietnam had no additional slots in the Play-In Stage for their summer runner-up team, because of the 24 team limit. The North American (NA LCS) summer split champion team was seeded to Pool 2 due to their performance at the 2018 Mid-Season Invitational.

Region	League	Path	Team	ID	Pool
Start in Group stage
South Korea	LCK	Summer Champion	KT Rolster	KT	1
South Korea	LCK	Most Championship Points	Afreeca Freecs	AF	2
South Korea	LCK	Regional Finals Winner	Gen.G	GEN	2
China	LPL	Summer Champion	Royal Never Give Up	RNG	1
China	LPL	Most Championship Points	Invictus Gaming	IG	2
Europe	EU LCS	Summer Champion	Fnatic	FNC	1
Europe	EU LCS	Most Championship Points	Team Vitality	VIT	2
North America	NA LCS	Summer Champion	Team Liquid	TL	2
North America	NA LCS	Most Championship Points	100 Thieves	100	2
TW/HK/MO	LMS	Summer Champion	Flash Wolves	FW	1
TW/HK/MO	LMS	Most Championship Points	MAD Team	MAD	2
Vietnam	VCS	Summer Champion	Phong Vũ Buffalo	PVB	2
Start in Play-in stage
China	LPL	Regional Finals Winner	EDward Gaming	EDG	1
Europe	EU LCS	Regional Finals Winner	G2 Esports	G2	1
North America	NA LCS	Regional Finals Winner	Cloud9	C9	1
TW/HK/MO	LMS	Regional Finals Winner	G-Rex	GRX	1
Brazil	CBLOL	Summer Champion	KaBuM! e-Sports	KBM	2
CIS	LCL	Summer Champion	Gambit Esports	GMB	2
Latin America North	LLN	Summer Champion	Infinity eSports CR	INF	2
Turkey	TCL	Summer Champion	SuperMassive e-Sports	SUP	2
Japan	LJL	Summer Champion	DetonatioN FocusMe	DFM	3
Latin America South	CLS	Summer Champion	Kaos Latin Gamers	KLG	3
Oceania	OPL	Summer Champion	Dire Wolves	DW	3
Southeast Asia	SEA	Summer Champion	Ascension Gaming	ASC	3

== Venues ==
Seoul, Busan, Gwangju, Incheon were the four cities chosen to host the competition.

South Korea
Seoul	Busan	Gwangju	Incheon
Play-in Stage	Group Stage and Quarterfinals	Semifinals	Finals
LoL Park	BEXCO Auditorium	Gwangju Women's University	Incheon Munhak Stadium
Capacity: 450	Capacity: 4,002	Capacity: 8,327	Capacity: 50,256
2018 League of Legends World Championship is located in South Korea

== Play-in stage ==
- Venue: LOL PARK, Gran Seoul 3F, Seoul.
- Date and time: October 1–4, started from 17:00 KST (UTC+09:00)

=== Groups ===
- Twelve teams are drawn in four groups, with three teams each group.
- Double round robin, all matches are best-of-one.
- If teams have same win–loss record and head to head, they will play a tiebreaker match for 1st or 2nd place.
- The top two teams of each group advance to round 2. The 3rd-place team is eliminated.

Group A

Pos	Team	Pld	W	L	PCT	Qualification
1	Edward Gaming	4	3	1	.750	Advance to play-in knockouts
2	Infinity Esports	4	2	2	.500	Advance to play-in knockouts
3	Dire Wolves	4	1	3	.250	

Source: LoL Esports (Archived 2018-12-18 at the Wayback Machine)

Group B

Pos	Team	Pld	W	L	PCT	Qualification
1	G2 Esports	5	4	1	.800	Advance to play-in knockouts
2	Bahçeşehir SuperMassive	5	3	2	.600	Advance to play-in knockouts
3	Ascension Gaming	4	0	4	.000	

Source: LoL Esports (Archived 2018-12-18 at the Wayback Machine)

Group C

Pos	Team	Pld	W	L	PCT	Qualification
1	Cloud9	4	4	0	1.000	Advance to play-in knockouts
2	DetonatioN FocusMe	5	2	3	.400	Advance to play-in knockouts
3	KaBuM! e-Sports	5	1	4	.200	

Source: LoL Esports (Archived 2018-12-18 at the Wayback Machine)

Group D

Pos	Team	Pld	W	L	PCT	Qualification
1	G-Rex	4	4	0	1.000	Advance to play-in knockouts
2	Gambit Esports	4	2	2	.500	Advance to play-in knockouts
3	Kaos Latin Gamers	4	0	4	.000	

Source: LoL Esports (Archived 2018-12-18 at the Wayback Machine)

=== Knockouts ===
- Eight teams are drawn randomly into a single-elimination match, with 1st-place teams of each group facing 2nd-place teams of another group.
- All matches are best-of-five.
- The 1st-place team chooses the side for all odd-numbered games, while the 2nd-place team chooses the side of even-numbered games.
- The winner advances to the main group stage.

Round 1
October 6, 13:00 KST
B1	G2 Esports	3
A2	Infinity Esports	1
October 6, 17:00 KST
D1	G-Rex	3
B2	Bahçeşehir SuperMassive	1
October 7, 13:00 KST
A1	Edward Gaming	3
C2	DetonatioN FocusMe	0
October 7, 17:00 KST
C1	Cloud9	3
D2	Gambit Esports	2

Source: LoL Esports (Archived 2018-12-18 at the Wayback Machine)

== Group stage ==
The group stage was held at the BEXCO Auditorium in Busan from 10 to 17 October, with matches beginning at 17:00 KST (UTC+09:00). Sixteen teams were drawn into four groups of four, with teams from the same region not permitted to be placed in the same group. The stage was played in a double round-robin format, with all matches contested as best-of-one. In cases where teams finished with identical win–loss and head-to-head records, a tiebreaker match was held. The top two teams from each group advanced to the Knockout Stage, while the bottom two were eliminated.

Group A

Pos	Team	Pld	W	L	PCT	Qualification
1	Afreeca Freecs	6	4	2	.667	Advance to knockouts
2	G2 Esports	7	4	3	.571	Advance to knockouts
3	Flash Wolves	7	3	4	.429	
4	Phong Vũ Buffalo	6	2	4	.333	

Source: LoL Esports (Archived 2018-12-18 at the Wayback Machine)

Group B

Pos	Team	Pld	W	L	PCT	Qualification
1	Royal Never Give Up	7	5	2	.714	Advance to knockouts
2	Cloud9	7	4	3	.571	Advance to knockouts
3	Team Vitality	6	3	3	.500	
4	Gen.G	6	1	5	.167	

Source: LoL Esports (Archived 2018-12-18 at the Wayback Machine)

Group C

Pos	Team	Pld	W	L	PCT	Qualification
1	KT Rolster	6	5	1	.833	Advance to knockouts
2	Edward Gaming	6	4	2	.667	Advance to knockouts
3	Team Liquid	6	3	3	.500	
4	MAD Team	6	0	6	.000	

Source: LoL Esports (Archived 2018-12-18 at the Wayback Machine)

Group D

Pos	Team	Pld	W	L	PCT	Qualification
1	Fnatic	7	6	1	.857	Advance to knockouts
2	Invictus Gaming	7	5	2	.714	Advance to knockouts
3	100 Thieves	6	2	4	.333	
4	G-Rex	6	0	6	.000	

Source: LoL Esports (Archived 2018-12-18 at the Wayback Machine)

== Knock-out stage ==
The knock-out stage featured eight teams drawn into a single-elimination bracket. Each first-place team from the group stage was matched against a second-place team from another group, with teams from the same group kept on opposite sides of the bracket to ensure that they could not meet until the final. All matches were played as best-of-five series.

Quarterfinals
October 20
C1	KT Rolster	2
D2	Invictus Gaming	3
October 20
B1	Royal Never Give Up	2
A2	G2 Esports	3
October 21
A1	Afreeca Freecs	0
B2	Cloud9	3
October 21
D1	Fnatic	3
C2	EDward Gaming	1

Semifinals
October 27
Invictus Gaming	3
G2 Esports	0
October 28
Cloud9	0
Fnatic	3

Final
November 3
Invictus Gaming	3
Fnatic	0

Source: LoL Esports (Archived 2018-12-18 at the Wayback Machine)

=== Quarterfinals ===
Quarterfinals	October 20	KT Rolster	2	–	3	Invictus Gaming	Busan, South Korea
	13:00 KST	Source					Busan Exhibition and Convention Center
		0	Game 1			1	
		0	Game 2			1	
		1	Game 3			0	
		1	Game 4			0	
		0	Game 5			1	

Quarterfinals	October 20	Royal Never Give Up	2	–	3	G2 Esports	Busan, South Korea
	17:00 KST	Source					Busan Exhibition and Convention Center
		0	Game 1			1	
		1	Game 2			0	
		0	Game 3			1	
		1	Game 4			0	
		1	Game 5			0	

Quarterfinals	October 21	Afreeca Freecs	0	–	3	Cloud9	Busan, South Korea
	13:00 KST	Source					Busan Exhibition and Convention Center
		0	Game 1			1	
		0	Game 2			1	
		0	Game 3			1	

Quarterfinals	October 21	Fnatic	3	–	1	Edward Gaming	Busan, South Korea
	17:00 KST	Source					Busan Exhibition and Convention Center
		0	Game 1			1	
		1	Game 2			0	
		1	Game 3			0	
		1	Game 4			0	

=== Semifinals ===
Semifinals	October 27	Invictus Gaming	3	–	0	G2 Esports	Gwangju, South Korea
	17:00 KST	Source					Gwangju Women's University Universiade Gymnasium
		1	Game 1			0	
		1	Game 2			0	
		1	Game 3			0	

Semifinals	October 28	Cloud9	0	–	3	Fnatic	Gwangju, South Korea
	17:00 KST	Source					Gwangju Women's University Universiade Gymnasium
		0	Game 1			1	
		0	Game 2			1	
		0	Game 3			1	

=== Final ===
Final	November 3	Invictus Gaming	3	–	0	Fnatic	Incheon, South Korea
	17:00 KST	Source					Incheon Munhak Stadium
		1	Game 1			0	
		1	Game 2			0	
		1	Game 3			0	

== Ranking ==
=== Team ranking ===
- (*) Does not include tiebreaker games.

Place	Region	Team	PS1	PS2	GS	QF	SF	Finals	Prize (USD)
1st	LPL	Invictus Gaming*			5–1	3–2	3–0	3–0	$2,418,750
2nd	EU LCS	Fnatic*			5–1	3–1	3–0	0–3	$870,750
3rd–4th	NA LCS	Cloud9*	4–0	3–2	4–2	3–0	0–3		$451,500
3rd–4th	EU LCS	G2 Esports*	3–1	3–1	3–3	3–2	0–3		$451,500
5th–6th	LCK	KT Rolster			5–1	2–3			$258,000
5th–6th	LPL	Royal Never Give Up*			4–2	2–3			$258,000
7th	LPL	EDward Gaming	3–1	3–0	4–2	1–3			$258,000
8th	LCK	Afreeca Freecs			4–2	0–3			$258,000
9th–11th	LMS	Flash Wolves*			3–3				$145,125
9th–11th	EU LCS	Team Vitality			3–3				$145,125
9th–11th	NA LCS	Team Liquid			3–3				$145,125
12th	NA LCS	100 Thieves			2–4				$145,125
13th	VCS	Phong Vũ Buffalo			2–4				$80,625
14th	LCK	Gen.G			1–5				$80,625
15th–16th	LMS	G-Rex	4–0	3–1	0–6				$80,625
15th–16th	LMS	MAD Team			0–6				$80,625
17th	LCL	Gambit Esports	2–2	2–3					$48,375
18th–19th	TCL	Super Massive e-Sports*	3–1	1–3					$48,375
18th–19th	LLN	Infinity eSports CR	2–2	1–3					$48,375
20th	LJL	DetonatioN FocusMe*	1–3	0–3					$48,375
21st–22nd	CBLOL	KaBuM! e-Sports*	1–3						$32,250
21st–22nd	OPL	Dire Wolves	1–3						$32,250
23rd–24th	CLS	Kaos Latin Gamers	0–4						$32,250
23rd–24th	SEA	Ascension Gaming	0–4						$32,250
Place	Region	Team	PS1	PS2	GS	QF	SF	Finals	Prize (USD)
