= Ankur Diwakar =

Indian esports player

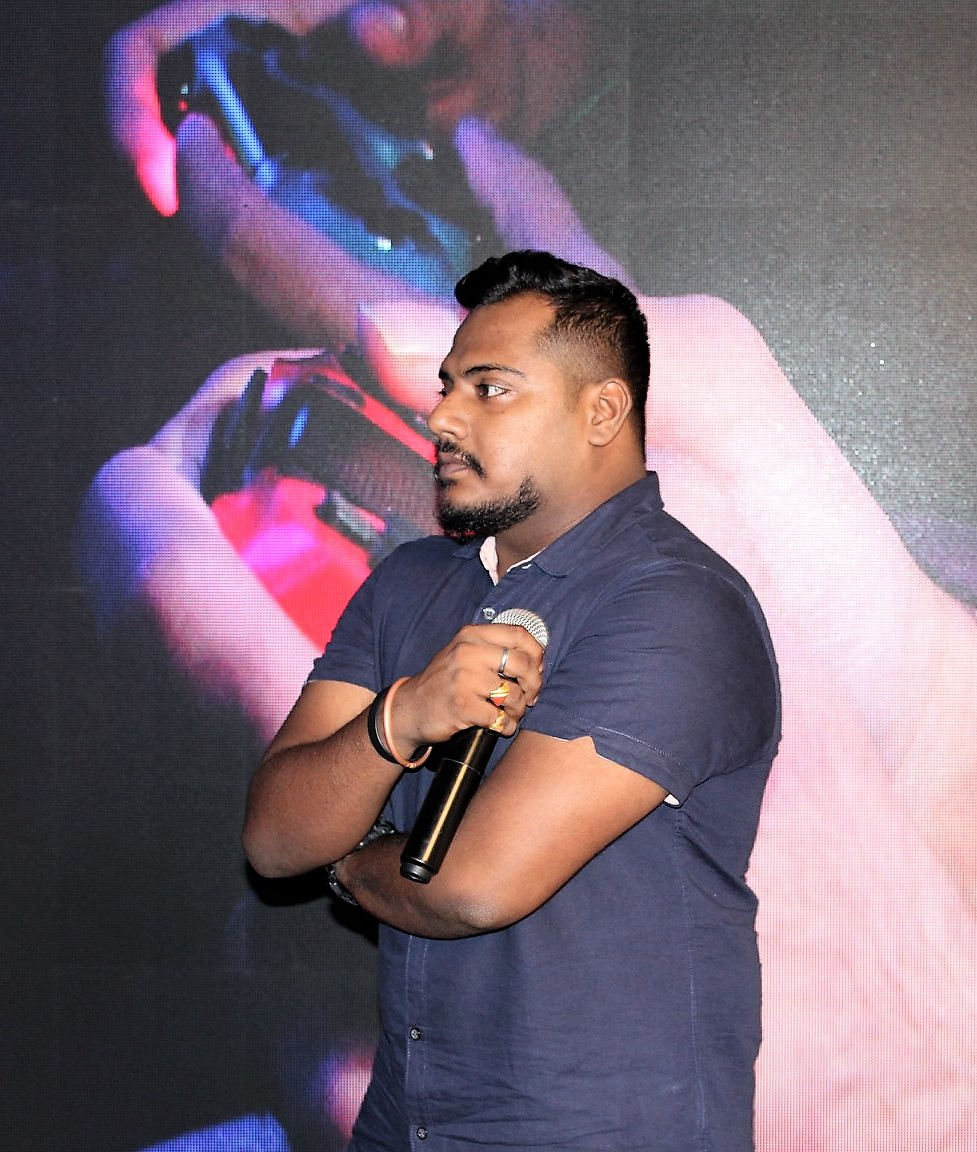
- Diwakar in 2019
- Born: 19 April 1991 (age 35); Bombay, India
- Other name: JauntyTank
- Occupation: Esports Athlete

Ankur Diwakar (born 19 April 1991) better known by his alias Jauntytank, is an Indian professional esports player. He is the winner of UCypher MTV India Season 1 tournament in India. He represented India in Asian Games 2018 and won the South Asian Championship.

== Esports career ==
Diwakar plays FIFA, Pro Evolution Soccer, and other games on consoles. Ankur Diwakar entered the esports scene in 2007. He started playing in local competitions. He won three majors in three different games in one year.

Diwakar was the winner of MTV India Ucypher Season 1, India's first televised multi-platform, multi-game, esports tournament where six veteran teams competed over a prize pool of Rs. 51 lakhs.

== Awards and honors ==
- 2018 MTV India UCypher Season 1 Winner.
- Indian Representative at Asian Games 2018 (esports) Indian Team
- South Asian Champion PES 2018
