= EVOS Esports =

Indonesian esports organisation

- Short name: EVOS
- Divisions: Active (8): Crossfire (2025–present); Delta Force (2025–present) eFootball (2025–present); Free Fire (2019–present); Magic Chess: Go Go (2025–present); Mobile Legends: Bang Bang (2017–present); Tekken (?–present); Valorant (2025–present) Past (12): Apex Legends (2024–2025); Arena of Valor (2017–2022); Call of Duty: Mobile (2019–2020); Call of Duty: Warzone (2025–present); Counter-Strike (2018–2019); Dota 2 (2016–2019); Fortnite (2018–2019); League of Legends (2017–2020); Point Blank (2018–2019); Pokémon Unite (2024–present); PUBG Mobile (2018–2023); Wild Rift (2021–2023)
- Founded: 21 August 2016; 10 years ago
- Based in: Jakarta, Indonesia
- Location: Southeast Asia
- Colors: Blue White
- CEO: Ivan Yeo
- Official fan club: EVOS Fams
- Partners: Axis; Pop Mie
- Website: www.evos.gg

EVOS Esports (briefly known as Zero Latitude) is an Indonesian esports organisation based in Jakarta. It currently has competitive teams in Free Fire, Mobile Legends: Bang Bang, and Pokémon Unite.

The organisation previously had teams in Arena of Valor, Call of Duty: Mobile, Counter-Strike, Dota 2, Fortnite, League of Legends, Wild Rift, Point Blank, and PUBG Mobile.

Their League of Legends team previously competed in the Vietnam Championship Series (VCS), the highest level of competitive League of Legends in the country. The team became VCS champions (a title held only by the GIGABYTE Marines at the time) on 7 April 2018, in their first appearance in the league. This qualified them for the 2018 Mid-Season Invitational (MSI), where they performed above expectations against other more well-known international teams.

== Mobile Legends: Bang Bang ==
=== Starting in MPL Indonesia ===
EVOS Esports was created in September 2016, starting with their Dota division; the team began to form another division on other games such as Mobile Legends: Bang Bang. The team did well on the small tournaments and after their consecutive losses, they started to re-organize. From there, they started to get traction in the tournaments after finishing in 2nd place in the first MPL and the succeeding season. In the next season, the team failed to qualify in the play-offs after their 8th position ranking. Consequently, the team had to re-organize once again, recruiting seasoned veterans of MPL such as Yurino "Donkey" Angkawidjaja, and new players Ihsan "Luminaire" Kusudana and Muhammad "Wannn" Ridwan. From the newly organized team, EVOS finished top seed in the regular season of MPL Season 4, and defeated the RRQ in the grand finals, winning their first championship. EVOS continued the momentum, resulting in the first M1 World Title in 2019 in Kuala Lumpur.

=== Entering the MPL Malaysia and Singapore scene ===
With the success of EVOS Legends in MPL Indonesia Season 1, EVOS Esports opted to enter the Malaysian and Singaporean scene. They were met with similar success, finishing 2nd in MPL MY/SG Season 2 and 3, before winning the tournament in Season 4.

=== Expanding to MPL Philippines ===
The EVOS organization tried to enter the Philippine scene by acquiring the MPL Philippines season 2 team SxC Imbalance. They were able to reach the playoffs, but, due to alleged corruption in the Philippine franchise organization, the team departures on MPL-PH. The remaining players of former EVOS Philippines were acquired by Tier One Entertainment team Blacklist International.

In June 2021, EVOS Esports and Nexplay Esports announced a new collaboration to form Nexplay EVOS, a competitive esports team for Mobile Legends MPL PH Season 8 tournament. Their collaboration continued until the end of season 11, when Nexplay EVOS was acquired by Minana, forming Minana EVOS. At the end of season 13, both Minana and EVOS decided to disband their team.

=== Tournament history ===
==== Mobile Legends: Bang Bang Professional League ====
Mobile Legends: Bang Bang Professional League results
EVOS Esports / EVOS Legends / EVOS Glory/ EVOS
Year		MPL Indonesia								Moonton international competitions			ESL competitions	
Year		P	W	L	Match W-L	W-L%	Match W-L%	Seed	Playoffs	MLBB Mid-Season Cup	MPL Invitational	MLBB World Championship	APAC/SEA Challenge Finals	Mobile Masters
2018	Season 1	9	7	1	15–3	.875	.833	2nd	2nd place 2–3; Team NXL	7th–8th place Group Stage	Not held		Not held	
2018	Season 2	9	6	3	13–8	.667	.619	4th	2nd place 0–3; RRQ.O2	7th–8th place Group Stage	Not held		Not held	
2019	Season 3	11	5	6	13–14	.455	.481	6th	7th–8th place 0–2; Alter Ego	Did not qualify	Not held	1st place 4–3; RRQ Hoshi	Not held	
2019	Season 4	14	11	3	23–9	.786	.719	1st	1st place 3–1; RRQ Hoshi	Did not qualify	Not held	1st place 4–3; RRQ Hoshi	Not held	
2020	Season 5	14	9	5	20–13	.643	.606	3rd	2nd place 2–3; RRQ Hoshi	Cancelled due to the COVID–19 pandemic	4th place 0–2; Burmese Ghouls	Did not qualify	Not held	
2020	Season 6	14	7	7	15–16	.500	.484	6th	5th–6th place 1–2; ONIC Esports	Cancelled due to the COVID–19 pandemic	13th–20th place 0–2; Alter Ego	Did not qualify	Not held	
2021	Season 7	14	9	5	22–14	.643	.611	2nd	1st place 4–2; Bigetron Alpha	3rd place 1–3; Execration	13th–20th place 0–2; RRQ Hoshi	Did not qualify	Not held	
2021	Season 8	14	8	6	18–14	.571	.563	4th	3rd place 2–3; ONIC Esports	3rd place 1–3; Execration	13th–20th place 0–2; RRQ Hoshi	Did not qualify	Not held	
2022	Season 9	14	8	6	18–17	.571	.514	4th	4th place 1–3; AURA Fire	Did not qualify	9th–12th place 1–2; BREN Esports	Did not qualify	Not held	
2022	Season 10	14	5	9	14–19	.357	.424	7th	Did not qualify	Did not qualify	9th–12th place 1–2; BREN Esports	Did not qualify	Not held	
2023	Season 11	14	7	7	18–17	.500	.514	5th	2nd place 0–4; ONIC Esports	5th–8th place 0–3; ONIC Esports	9th–13th place Group Stage; 1–2	Did not qualify	9th–10th place Group Stage; 2–3 (S3)	Not held
2023	Season 12	16	6	10	17–19	.375	.389	7th	Did not qualify	5th–8th place 0–3; ONIC Esports	9th–13th place Group Stage; 1–2	Did not qualify	9th–10th place Group Stage; 2–3 (S3)	Not held
2024	Season 13	16	8	8	20–23	.500	.465	5th	2nd place 2–4; Fnatic ONIC	9th–12th place Group Stage; 0–2–1	Defunct	Did not qualify	Did not qualify (S5)	Not held
2024	Season 14	16	3	13	12–29	.188	.293	9th	Did not qualify	9th–12th place Group Stage; 0–2–1	Defunct	Did not qualify	Did not qualify (S5)	Not held
2025	Season 15	16	7	9	19–21	.438	.475	7th	Did not qualify	Did not qualify	Defunct	Did not qualify	Eliminated in Challenge Season (S6)	Did not qualify
2025	Season 16	16	8	8	20-19	.500	.513	4th	3rd place 2–4; Alter Ego	Did not qualify	Defunct	Did not qualify	Eliminated in Challenge Season (S6)	Did not qualify
All-time stats		221	114	106	277–265	.518	.511	–	2 MPL titles	0 MSC titles	0 MPLI titles	1 Worlds title	0 Finals titles	0 Masters titles
EVOS Singapore (disbanded)
Year		MPL Malaysia/Singapore								Moonton international competitions			ESL competitions	
Year		P	W	L	Match W-L	W-L%	Match W-L%	Seed	Playoffs	MLBB Mid-Season Cup	MPL Invitational	MLBB World Championship	APAC/SEA Challenge Finals	Mobile Masters
2018	Season 2	9	6	3	13–6	.667	.684	2nd	2nd place 1–3; Saiyan Reborn	Did not qualify	Not held		Not held	
2019	Season 3	9	4	5	12–11	.444	.522	5th	2nd place 1–3; Geek Fam	5th–6th place 0–2; ArkAngel	Not held	9th–12th place Group Stage; 1–2	Not held	
2019	Season 4	9	7	2	16–5	.778	.516	1st	1st place 3–2; TODAK	5th–6th place 0–2; ArkAngel	Not held	9th–12th place Group Stage; 1–2	Not held	
2020	Season 5	9	7	2	15–6	.778	.714	3rd	4th place 0–2; Orange Reborn	Cancelled due to the COVID–19 pandemic	9th–11th place Group Stage; 2–1	7th–8th place 0–2; TODAK	Not held	
2020	Season 6	9	6	3	15–7	.667	.682	1st	2nd place 1–3; TODAK	Cancelled due to the COVID–19 pandemic	9th–12th place 1–2; Ronin Squad	7th–8th place 0–2; TODAK	Not held	
Year		MPL Singapore								Moonton international competitions			ESL competitions	
Year		P	W	L	Match W-L	W-L%	Match W-L%	Seed	Playoffs	MLBB Mid-Season Cup	MPL Invitational	MLBB World Championship	APAC/SEA Challenge Finals	Mobile Masters
2021	Season 1	7	6	1	13–4	.857	.765	2nd	1st place 3–0; RSG Singapore	7th–8th place 0–2; Impunity KH	5th–8th place 0–2; Alter Ego	4th place 0–3; Blacklist Int.	Not held	
2021	Season 2	7	5	2	12–5	.714	.706	1st	1st place 4–1; RSG Singapore	7th–8th place 0–2; Impunity KH	5th–8th place 0–2; Alter Ego	4th place 0–3; Blacklist Int.	Not held	
2022	Season 3	6	4	2	9–6	.667	.600	3rd	2nd place 1–4; RSG Singapore	7th–8th place 0–3; Omega Esports	Did not qualify	Did not qualify	Not held	
All-time stats		65	45	20	105–50	.692	.677	–	3 MPL titles	0 MSC titles	0 MPLI titles	0 Worlds titles	0 Finals titles	0 Masters titles
EVOS Esports PH / Nexplay EVOS / Minana EVOS (disbanded)
Year		MPL Philippines								Moonton international competitions			ESL competitions	
Year		P	W	L	Match W-L	W-L%	Match W-L%	Seed	Playoffs	MLBB Mid-Season Cup	MPL Invitational	MLBB World Championship	APAC/SEA Challenge Finals	Mobile Masters
2019	Season 3	9	5	4	13–8	.556	.619	3rd	4th place 1–2; Cignal Ultra	Did not qualify	Not held	Did not qualify	Not held	
2019	Season 4	9	3	6	9–14	.333	.391	6th	7th–8th place 1–2; BREN Esports	Did not qualify	Not held	Did not qualify	Not held	
2021	Season 8	14	7	7	18–16	.500	.529	3rd	4th place 0–3; Blacklist Int.	Did not qualify	13th–20th place 0–2; Rebellion Esports	Did not qualify	Not held	
2022	Season 9	14	6	8	15–18	.429	.455	4th	5th–6th place 2–3; ONIC Philippines	Did not qualify	Did not qualify	Did not qualify	Not held	
2022	Season 10	14	2	12	9–25	.077	.265	7th	Did not qualify	Did not qualify	Did not qualify	Did not qualify	Not held	
2023	Season 11	14	4	10	13–22	.286	.371	7th	Did not qualify	Did not qualify	Did not qualify	Did not qualify	Eliminated in Open Finals (S3)	Not held
2023	Season 12	14	6	8	14–17	.429	.452	7th	Did not qualify	Did not qualify	Did not qualify	Did not qualify	Eliminated in Open Finals (S3)	Not held
2024	Season 13	14	6	8	15–17	.429	.469	6th	6th place 2–3; Blacklist Int.	Did not qualify	Did not qualify	Did not qualify	Did not qualify (S5)	Not held
All-time stats		112	39	63	106–137	.382	.436	–	0 MPL titles	0 MSC titles	0 MPLI titles	0 Worlds titles	0 Finals titles	0 Masters titles

==== Mobile Legends: Bang Bang Development League ====
Mobile Legends: Bang Bang Development League
EVOS Icon
Year		MDL Indonesia									ESL competitions
Year		Stage	P	W	L	Match W-L	W-L%	Match W-L%	Seed	Playoffs	APAC/SEA Challenge Finals
2020	1	Group	11	3	8	11–17	.273	.393	9th	Did not qualify	Not held
2020	2	Group	10	6	4	14–13	.600	.519	4th	3rd–4th place 0–2; RRQ Sena	Not held
2021	3	Group	13	9	4	21–9	.692	.700	2nd	3rd–4th place 0–2; Victim Esports	Not held
2021	4	Group	13	10	3	22–12	.769	.647	2nd	2nd place 1–3; Alter Ego X	Not held
2022	5	Group	13	9	4	22–12	.692	.647	1st	1st place 3–1; Alter Ego X	Not held
2022	6	Group	13	11	2	24–6	.846	.800	1st	2nd place 0–3; Bigetron Beta	Not held
2023	7	Group	15	10	5	23–14	.667	.622	2nd	1st place 4–2; Dewa United	7th–8th place Group Stage; 2–3 (S3)
2023	8	Group	16	11	5	24–15	.688	.632	4th	5th–8th place 0–3; ONIC Prodigy	7th–8th place Group Stage; 2–3 (S3)
2024	9	Group	3	3	0	6–3	1.000	.667	1st	Did not qualify	Eliminated in Indonesia Qualifier (S5)
2024	9	Swiss	4	1	3	8–9	.250	.471	12th	Did not qualify	Eliminated in Indonesia Qualifier (S5)
2024	10	Group	3	3	0	6–1	1.000	.857	1st	5th–8th place 0–3; Pendekar Esports	Eliminated in Indonesia Qualifier (S5)
2024	10	Swiss	3	3	0	9–4	1.000	.692	1st	5th–8th place 0–3; Pendekar Esports	Eliminated in Indonesia Qualifier (S5)
2025	11	Group	3	2	1	5–2	.667	.714	1st	5th–8th place 0–3; ONIC Prodigy	Did not qualify (S6)
2025	11	Swiss	5	3	2	12–12	.600	.500	8th	5th–8th place 0–3; ONIC Prodigy	Did not qualify (S6)
2025	12	Group	3	3	0	6–2	1.000	.750	1st	Did not qualify	Did not qualify (S6)
2025	12	Swiss	4	1	3	4–9	.250	.308	12th	Did not qualify	Did not qualify (S6)
All-time stats			132	88	44	217–142	.667	.604	–	2 MDL titles	0 Finals titles

==== Mobile Legends: Bang Bang: Indonesia National Esports League ====
Mobile Legends: Bang Bang: Indonesia National Esports League results
EVOS Holy
Year	Indonesia National Esports League										ESL competitions
Year	Division	P	W	D	L	Match W-L	W-L%	Match W-L%	Seed	Playoffs	APAC/SEA Challenge Finals
2023	Liga 1	11	2	4	5	8–14	.182	.364	10th	Did not qualify	Did not qualify (S3)
2024	Liga 1	13	10	3	0	23–3	.769	.885	2nd	2nd place 0–3; ONIC Miracle	Eliminated in Challenge Season (S5)
2025	Liga 1	10	4	5	1	13-7	.400	.650	3rd	2nd place 1–3; Dewa United Osiris	11th–12th place Group Stage; 2–3 (S6)
All-time stats		24	12	7	5	31–17	.500	.646	–	0 Lignas titles	0 Finals titles

=== Honours ===
Background shading indicates that the tournament is organized by Moonton.
Background shading indicates that the tournament is a national tournament.
Background shading indicates that the tournament is organized by ESL.

Indonesia EVOS Legends / Evos Glory
Tournament	Champions	Runners-up	Finals	Season won	Season runners-up	Best results
MPL Indonesia	2	5	7	S4, S7	S1, S2, S5, S11, S13	Champions
Mobile Legends: Bang Bang Mid Season Cup	0	0	0	–	–	3rd place (2021)
M World Championship	1	0	1	M1	–	Champions
President's Cup	0	0	0	–	–	3rd place (2023)
Indonesia Evos Icon
Tournament	Champions	Runners-up	Finals	Season won	Season runners-up	Best results
MDL Indonesia	2	2	4	S5, S7	S4, S6	Champions
President's Cup	0	0	0	–	–	5th–6th place (2022)
Indonesia Evos Holy
Tournament	Champions	Runners-up	Finals	Season won	Season runners-up	Best results
National Esports League (1st Division)	0	2	2	–	NL 2024, NL 2025	Runners-up
Singapore Evos Singapore (disbanded)
Tournament	Champions	Runners-up	Finals	Season won	Season runners-up	Best results
MPL MY/SG (defunct)	1	3	4	S4	S2, S3, S6	Champions
MPL Singapore	2	1	3	S1, S2	S3	Champions

== Pokemon Unite ==
In June 2024, EVOS entered the Pokemon Unite esports scene by acquiring the Onyx roster.

=== Tournament history ===
Pokemon Unite Professional League results
EVOS Onyx (disbanded)
Year	Asia Champions League										Championship Series Indonesia	World Championship
Year	P	W	L	Match W-L	W-L%	Match W-L%	Seed	Playoffs (SEA)	Winter Tournament SEA West	Finals	Championship Series Indonesia	World Championship
2024	Played under Onyx											17th–24th place Group Stage
2025	9	4	5	12–11	.444	.522	5th	7th–8th place 0–2 vs ONIC Rise	2nd place 0–2 vs ONIC Rise	Did not qualify	Played under Onyx	
EVOS (disbanded)
Year	Asia Champions League										Championship Series Taiwan and Hong Kong	World Championship
Year	P	W	L	Match W-L	W-L%	Match W-L%	Seed	Playoffs (SEA)	Winter Tournament SEA East	Finals	Championship Series Taiwan and Hong Kong	World Championship
2026	Different format						5th	6th place 1–2 vs Team Nemesis	2th place 0-2 vs Team Nemesis	Did not qualify	Played under Deep Cross Gaming	
EVOS
Year	Asia Champions League										Championship Series Indonesia	World Championship
Year	P	W	L	Match W-L	W-L%	Match W-L%	Seed	Playoffs (SEA)	Winter Tournament SEA East	Finals	Championship Series Indonesia	World Championship
2026	Did Not Participate										Played under TryHard	25th-29th Place; Group Stage; 0-3

=== Honours ===
EVOS Onyx
Tournament	Champions	Runners-up	3rd place	Best results
Pokémon UNITE; Winter Tournament SEA West	0	1 (2025)	0	2nd place
EVOS
Tournament	Champions	Runners-up	3rd place	Best results
Pokémon UNITE; Winter Tournament SEA East	0	1 (2026)	0	2nd place

== Disbanded teams ==
=== League of Legends ===
EVOS Esports' League of Legends team competes in the Vietnam Championship Series (VCS), the highest level of competitive League of Legends in Vietnam. In the VCS 2018 Spring Split, EVOS finished first in the regular season, ending with a 12–2 record. Their placement in the regular season secured EVOS a finals bye in the playoffs, where they beat GIGABYTE Marines 3–2, qualifying them for the 2018 Mid-Season Invitational (MSI).

In the MSI 2018 main event qualifiers, EVOS beat SuperMassive eSports 3–1 to secure a spot in the main event. EVOS ended the main event at MSI 2018 with a 2–8 record, failing to qualify for the playoffs.

EVOS' longtime mid-laner Đoàn "Warzone" Văn Ngọc Sơn retired from professional play on 15 September 2018 and became a streamer for the organisation. He was replaced by Võ "Petland" Huỳnh Quang Huy and Lê "Dia1" Phú Quý in preparation for the VCS 2019 Spring Split.

EVOS placed third in the regular season with a 9–5 record, qualifying for the playoffs. In the first round of the playoffs, EVOS defeated Friends Forever 3–2 in a close series, and in the second round EVOS defeated Sky Gaming 3–1, moving on to face Phong Vũ Buffalo in the finals, which they lost 1–3. EVOS disbanded its League of Legends division on 7 December 2020.

==== Tournament history ====
League of Legends Vietnam Championship Series results
EVOS Esports (disbanded)
Year		Vietnam Championship Series								International competitions	
Year		P	W	L	Match W-L	W-L%	Match W-L%	Seed	Playoffs	LOL Mid-Season Invitational	LOL Worlds
2018	Spring	14	12	2	26–7	.857	.788	1st	1st place 3–2; GAM Esports	7th–8th place Group Stage	Did not qualify
2018	Summer	14	8	6	20–14	.571	.588	3rd	4th place 2–3; Adonis Esports	7th–8th place Group Stage	Did not qualify
2019	Spring	14	9	5	18–11	.643	.621	3rd	2nd place 1–3; Phong Vũ Buffalo	Did not qualify	
2019	Summer	14	6	8	16–17	.429	.485	5th	Failed to qualify	Did not qualify	
2020	Spring	14	8	6	19–17	.571	.528	4th	3rd place 1–3; Team Flash	Did not qualify	
2020	Summer	14	7	7	17–15	.500	.531	6th	3rd place 2–3; GAM Esports	Did not qualify	
All-time stats		84	50	34	116–81	.595	.589	–	1 VCS title	0 MSC titles	0 Worlds titles

==== Honours ====
Vietnam EVOS Esports (disbanded)
Tournament	Champions	Runners-up	Finals	Season won	Season runners-up
Vietnam Championship Series	1	1	2	VCS Spring 2018	VCS Spring 2019

=== Arena of Valor ===
EVOS Esports entered the competitive Arena of Valor scene in 2017 with its acquisition of an all-Indonesian roster. In August 2018, Hartawan "WyvorZ" Muliadi, Sultandyo "MythR" Raihan, and Hartanto "POKKA" Lius joined the team. EVOS won AOV Star League Season 2 on 16 February 2019, qualifying for the 2019 Arena of Valor World Cup as Indonesia's representative. EVOS disbanded its Arena of Valor Vietnam division on 4 December 2020.

==== Honours ====
Indonesia EVOS Esports (disbanded)
Tournament	Champions	Runners-up	Finals	Season won	Season runners-up
AOV Star League	4	0	4	S1, S2, S3, S4	–

== Performance in Esports World Cup (EWC) ==
=== History ===
In March 2025, EVOS was officially selected as one of 40 esports organizations worldwide to join the Esports World Cup Foundation's Club Partner Program. EVOS was joined by RRQ and ONIC Esports as the only representatives from Indonesia and Southeast Asia to be selected to the program.

=== Results ===
Key – result
Colour	Meaning
Gold	Winner
Silver	Second place
Bronze	Third place or equivalent
Green	Other points position
Blue	Other classified position
Red	Did not qualify (DNQ)
White	Did not enter (DNE)
Tan	Game not featured

Key – team status
Colour	Meaning
Light green	Active
Light pink	Disbanded

Key – symbols
Symbol	Meaning
†	Not eligible for EWC points

EVOS performance by game
Game		Team	2024	2025	2026
Apex Legends		EVOS	36	27^{†}	DNE
Call of Duty: Warzone		EVOS	DNE	11^{†}	DNE
Cross Fire		EVOS	N/A	13-16	DNE
Free Fire		EVOS Divine	2	1	10
Mobile Legends: Bang Bang	Men's	EVOS	9-12	DNQ	DNQ
Mobile Legends: Bang Bang	Women's	EVOS Eclipse	DNE	DNQ	DNQ
Teamfight Tactics		EVOS	DNE	5-8^{†}	DNE
Valorant		EVOS ARF	N/A	DNQ	DNE
Total points			600	1000	0

== Rosters ==
EVOS Esports rosters

Mobile Legends: Bang Bang
Handle	Name	Nationality
Vell	Kenley Nathaniel Zefanya	Indonesia
Alberttt	Albert Neilsen Iskandar	Indonesia
Erlan	Erland Saputra	Indonesia
Egatzy	Ega Raka Putra Pratama	Indonesia
Rendyy	Rendy Chandra Wijaya	Indonesia
DrianW	N/A	Indonesia

Mobile Legends: Bang Bang Icon
Handle	Name	Nationality
Zixee	Rizki Salusi Pakpahan	Indonesia
Reyna	Febryan Alphareza	Indonesia
Sense	Rendi Hidayat	Indonesia
Daniel	Daniel Ibel Ferdinand Wagey	Indonesia
Xzorr	Triyadhi Kusuma	Indonesia
Alevaa	E. Bela Nusa Ardhaleva	Indonesia
Iyekk	N/A	Indonesia

Mobile Legends: Bang Bang Eclipse
Handle	Name	Nationality
Namira	Ira Kusnindi	Indonesia
Ash	Delvia Ivana	Indonesia
Mikasa	Najla Dhia Gunawan	Indonesia
Neyyy	Neyla Felicia	Indonesia
Mavis	Fitriyani	Indonesia
Pou	Salsabila Mia	Indonesia

Free Fire Divine
Handle	Name	Nationality
Yuda	Wahyuda wijaya	Indonesia
Rasyah	Rasyah Rasyid	Cambodia
AimGOD	Aji Apri Wicaksono	Indonesia
Reyyy	Rayandra Eka	Indonesia
Koceel	M.Excel Verilyan Putra	Indonesia

Free Fire Icy
Handle	Name	Nationality
Merc	Melani Harly	Indonesia
Nune	Nuraini	Indonesia
Bella	Ariella Levina Bella	Indonesia
Jenna	Jenna Leboni	Thailand
Minwi (L)	N/A	Thailand

Legend:
- (I) Inactive
- (S) Suspended
- (L) On loan
- (2W) Two-way player
- Substitute
- (injured) Injury / Illness

Awards and achievements
Preceded by Inaugural	MLBB World Championship winner 2019	Succeeded by Bren Esports
Preceded by ONIC Esports; RRQ Hoshi	MPL Indonesia champions 2019 – Season 4; 2021 – Season 7	Succeeded by RRQ Hoshi; ONIC Esports
