= Esports at the 2018 Asian Games =

- Venue: The BritAma Arena
- Dates: 26 August – 1 September 2018
- Competitors: 131 from 18 nations

Esports were featured at the 2018 Asian Games as a demonstration sport, meaning medals won in this sport would not be counted in the official overall medal tally. It was held from 26 August to 1 September 2018. Six video games were featured in the demonstration event, Arena of Valor, Clash Royale, Hearthstone, League of Legends, Pro Evolution Soccer 2018, and StarCraft II.

== Medalists ==
Event	Gold	Silver	Bronze
Clash Royale	Ridel Yesaya Sumarandak; Indonesia	Huang Chenghui; China	Huỳnh Đức Huy; Vietnam
Hearthstone	Lo Tsz Kin; Hong Kong	Hendry Koentarto Handisurya; Indonesia	Tirth Mehta; India
StarCraft II	Cho Seong-ju; South Korea	Huang Yu-shiang; Chinese Taipei	Trần Hồng Phúc; Vietnam
Pro Evolution Soccer 2018	Japan; Tsubasa Aihara; Naoki Sugimura	Iran; Reza Nobakht; Hassan Pajani	Vietnam; Đỗ Thái Thiên Phúc; Lê Đoàn Thanh Tâm
Arena of Valor	China; Zhang Yuchen; Liu Mingjie; Pan Jiadong; Wang Tianlong; Xiang Yang; Xie Tao	Chinese Taipei; Lin Chun-ting; Cheng Ming-jen; Cheng Yu-hsiang; Huang Chien-wei; Yen Hao-che; Chen Po-cheng	Vietnam; Phạm Hồng Quân; Vương Trung Khiên; Trần Xuân Bách; Nguyễn Quân Nam; Trần Quang Hiệp; Nguyễn Trí Hùng
League of Legends	China; Yan Junze; Liu Shiyu; Su Hanwei; Jian Zihao; Tian Ye; Shi Senming	South Korea; Kim Ki-in; Go Dong-bin; Lee Sang-hyeok; Park Jae-hyuk; Jo Yong-in; Han Wang-ho	Chinese Taipei; Hsieh Yu-ting; Wang You-chun; Huang Yi-tang; Lu Yu-hung; Hu Shuo-chieh; Chen Kuan-ting

== Medal table ==
Rank	Nation	Gold	Silver	Bronze	Total
1	China (CHN)	2	1	0	3
2	Indonesia (INA)	1	1	0	2
2	South Korea (KOR)	1	1	0	2
4	Hong Kong (HKG)	1	0	0	1
4	Japan (JPN)	1	0	0	1
6	Chinese Taipei (TPE)	0	2	1	3
7	Iran (IRI)	0	1	0	1
8	Vietnam (VIE)	0	0	4	4
9	India (IND)	0	0	1	1
Totals (9 entries)		6	6	6	18

== Participating nations ==
A total of 131 athletes from 18 nations competed in esports at the 2018 Asian Games:

- China (13)
- Chinese Taipei (13)
- Hong Kong (9)
- India (9)
- Indonesia (17)
- Iran (3)
- Japan (3)
- Kazakhstan (9)
- Kyrgyzstan (1)
- Laos (6)
- Malaysia (2)
- Pakistan (6)
- Saudi Arabia (7)
- South Korea (7)
- Sri Lanka (1)
- Thailand (7)
- Uzbekistan (1)
- Vietnam (17)

== Qualification ==
Qualification for the six video game title events took place from 6–20 June 2018. Among 45 member nation invited, only 27 NOCs participated in the qualifiers. There were five qualification zones for the regional qualifiers (East Asia, Southeast Asia, South Asia, Central Asia, and West Asia) except for Arena of Valor which only had three regional qualifiers (East Asia, Southeast Asia, and South Asia). Qualification took place either through online matches, offline competitions, or a mix of both formats. Indonesia qualifies for all titles automatically.

Qualification berths

Title	Hosts	East Asia	Southeast Asia	South Asia	Central Asia	West Asia
Clash Royale	1	2	2	1	1	1
Hearthstone	1	2	2	1	1	1
StarCraft II	1	2	2	1	1	1
Pro Evolution Soccer 2018	1	2	2	1	1	1
Arena of Valor	1	3	3	1	0	0
League of Legends	1	3	1	1	1	1

== Results ==
=== Clash Royale ===
27 August

==== Winner group ====
Round 1		Round 2		Round 3
Chirasit Phongpadith (LAO)	2
Aaron Ho (HKG)	3	Aaron Ho (HKG)	1
Ridel Yesaya Sumarandak (INA)	3	Ridel Yesaya Sumarandak (INA)	3
Huang Chenghui (CHN)	1			Ridel Yesaya Sumarandak (INA)	3
Huỳnh Đức Huy (VIE)	3			Huỳnh Đức Huy (VIE)	2
Sanjar Usmonov (UZB)	0	Huỳnh Đức Huy (VIE)	3
Solaiman Al-Mbrek (KSA)	0	Karan Manganani (IND)	1
Karan Manganani (IND)	3

==== Loser group ====
Round 2
Chirasit Phongpadith (LAO)	1
Huang Chenghui (CHN)	3
Sanjar Usmonov (UZB)	0
Solaiman Al-Mbrek (KSA)	3

Round 3
Aaron Ho (HKG)	0
Huang Chenghui (CHN)	3
Karan Manganani (IND)	3
Solaiman Al-Mbrek (KSA)	0

Round 3
Huang Chenghui (CHN)	3
Karan Manganani (IND)	0

==== Finals ====
Semifinal		Final
		Ridel Yesaya Sumarandak (INA)	3	0	3
Huỳnh Đức Huy (VIE)	2	Huang Chenghui (CHN)	1	3	0
Huang Chenghui (CHN)	3

- The first match between Indonesia and China in the first round was also counted in the final series.

=== Hearthstone ===
31 August

Round 1
Tirth Mehta (IND)	3
Tetsuro Akasaka (JPN)	2
Lo Tsz Kin (HKG)	3
Artur Mukashov (KGZ)	0
Werit Popan (THA)	1
Hendry Koentarto Handisurya (INA)	3
Mosa Al-Kaltham (KSA)	1
Nguyễn Anh Tuấn (VIE)	3

Semifinals
Tirth Mehta (IND)	2
Lo Tsz Kin (HKG)	3
Hendry Koentarto Handisurya (INA)	3
Nguyễn Anh Tuấn (VIE)	2

Final
Lo Tsz Kin (HKG)	3
Hendry Koentarto Handisurya (INA)	1
3rd place match
Tirth Mehta (IND)	3
Nguyễn Anh Tuấn (VIE)	2

=== StarCraft II ===
30 August

Round 1
Cho Seong-ju (KOR)	3
Pichayut Prasertwit (THA)	0
Shahriar Shaki (IRI)	3
Nyoman Arie Pranasakti (INA)	0
Huang Yu-shiang (TPE)	3
Amruth Alfred (SRI)	0
Trần Hồng Phúc (VIE)	3
Adlet Satybaldin (KAZ)	0

Semifinals
Cho Seong-ju (KOR)	3
Shahriar Shaki (IRI)	0
Huang Yu-shiang (TPE)	3
Trần Hồng Phúc (VIE)	1

Final
Cho Seong-ju (KOR)	4
Huang Yu-shiang (TPE)	0
3rd place match
Shahriar Shaki (IRI)	0
Trần Hồng Phúc (VIE)	3

=== Pro Evolution Soccer 2018 ===
1 September

==== Preliminary round ====
Group A
Pos	Team	Pld	W	L	Pts	IRI	MAS	HKG	KAZ
1	Reza Nobakht (IRI) Hassan Pajani (IRI)	3	3	0	9	—	2–0	2–0	2–0
2	Khairul Abdul Aziz (MAS) Nor Haikal Noh (MAS)	3	2	1	6	0–2	—	2–0	2–0
3	Lam Wing Cheung (HKG) Charles Ng (HKG)	3	1	2	3	0–2	0–2	—	2–0
4	Kanysh Abykenov (KAZ) Rinat Utepov (KAZ)	3	0	3	0	0–2	0–2	0–2	—

Group B
Pos	Team	Pld	W	L	Pts	JPN	VIE	INA	IND
1	Tsubasa Aihara (JPN) Naoki Sugimura (JPN)	3	3	0	9	—	2–0	2–0	2–0
2	Đỗ Thái Thiên Phúc (VIE) Lê Đoàn Thanh Tâm (VIE)	3	2	1	6	0–2	—	2–0	2–0
3	Elga Cahya Putra (INA) Setia Widianto (INA)	3	1	2	3	0–2	0–2	—	2–0
4	Ankur Diwakar (IND) Navaneetha Krishnan (IND)	3	0	3	0	0–2	0–2	0–2	—

Source: AESF

==== Knockout round ====
Semifinals
Tsubasa Aihara (JPN); Naoki Sugimura (JPN)	2
Khairul Abdul Aziz (MAS); Nor Haikal Noh (MAS)	0
Reza Nobakht (IRI); Hassan Pajani (IRI)	2
Đỗ Thái Thiên Phúc (VIE); Lê Đoàn Thanh Tâm (VIE)	1

Final
Tsubasa Aihara (JPN); Naoki Sugimura (JPN)	2
Reza Nobakht (IRI); Hassan Pajani (IRI)	1
3rd place match
Khairul Abdul Aziz (MAS); Nor Haikal Noh (MAS)	1
Đỗ Thái Thiên Phúc (VIE); Lê Đoàn Thanh Tâm (VIE)	2

=== Arena of Valor ===
26 August

==== Winner group ====
Round 1		Round 2		Round 3
Hong Kong	2
Laos	0	Hong Kong	1
Vietnam	2	Vietnam	2
India	0			Vietnam	1
Indonesia	0			China	2
Chinese Taipei	2	Chinese Taipei	0
Thailand	0	China	2
China	2

==== Loser group ====
Round 2
Laos	2
India	0
Indonesia	1
Thailand	2

Round 3
Hong Kong	2
Laos	0
Chinese Taipei	2
Thailand	1

Round 3
Hong Kong	0
Chinese Taipei	2

==== Finals ====
Semifinal		Final
		China	2
Vietnam	0	Chinese Taipei	0
Chinese Taipei	2

=== League of Legends ===
==== Preliminary round ====
27–28 August

Group A
Pos	Team	Pld	W	L	KOR	CHN	VIE	KAZ
1	South Korea	6	6	0	—	1–0	1–0	1–0
2	China	6	4	2	0–1	—	1–0	1–0
3	Vietnam	6	2	4	0–1	0–1	—	1–0
4	Kazakhstan	6	0	6	0–1	0–1	0–1	—

Group B
Pos	Team	Pld	W	L	TPE	KSA	PAK	INA
1	Chinese Taipei	6	6	0	—	1–0	1–0	1–0
2	Saudi Arabia	6	4	2	0–1	—	1–0	1–0
3	Pakistan	6	2	4	0–1	0–1	—	1–0
4	Indonesia	6	0	6	0–1	0–1	0–1	—

Source: AESF

==== Knockout round ====
Semifinals; 28 August
South Korea	2
Saudi Arabia	0
Chinese Taipei	1
China	2

Final; 28–29 August
South Korea	1
China	3
3rd place match
Saudi Arabia	1
Chinese Taipei	3
