= 2027 First Stand Tournament =

Riot Games esports tournament in China

Tournament information
- Sport: League of Legends
- Location: China
- Administrator: Riot Games

The 2027 First Stand Tournament, branded as First Stand: All In, will be the third edition of the First Stand Tournament (FST) – a League of Legends tournament organized by publisher Riot Games organized in the first third of the competitive calendar. The tournament will be held in China and is set to feature the most teams of any League of Legends tournament.

Bilibili Gaming of China's League of Legends Pro League (LPL) are the tournament's defending champions.

== Background and host selection ==
On 4 March 2026, following criticism over the venue selection of the 2026 First Stand Tournament, Riot Games' global head of League of Legends esports Chris Greeley, stated that the purpose of FST in the competitive calendar would reviewed for 2027.

During the media day for the 2026 World Championship Final in New York City, United States, on 13 November 2026, Riot Games announced the event as First Stand: All In, with the focus being that it will have the most teams of any League of Legends tournament. The event will also move from Southeast Asia to China, with the former hosting the 2028 tournament instead. It has been announced previously on 8 January 2025 that Southeast Asia would host the tournament.

== Qualification ==
It is expected that teams from the Campeonato Brasileiro de League of Legends (CBLOL), League of Legends Champions Korea (LCK), League of Legends Championship Pacific (LCP), League Championship Series (LCS), League of Legends EMEA Championship (LEC), and League of Legends Pro League (LPL) will qualify, but the quota distribution has not been determined.
