= Royal Never Give Up =

Chinese esports organization

- Short name: RNG
- Games: Honor of Kings; League of Legends; League of Legends: Wild Rift; PlayerUnknown's Battlegrounds
- Founded: Royal Club founded: May 2012; RNG rebrand: 15 May 2015
- League: League of Legends Pro League
- Championships: 3× Mid-Season Invitational; 5× LPL
- Website: www.royalgroups.cn

Royal Never Give Up (RNG) is a Chinese esports organization. It began as a professional League of Legends team named Royal Club competing in the League of Legends Pro League (LPL), the game's top level of competition in China. To reflect its titular sponsor, the team was known as Star Horn Royal Club from 2014 until 2015, when the team took on its current name. At the same time, the Royal Club name was relegated to the organization's then newly formed academy team.

RNG's League of Legends division disbanded at the end of the 2025 season. During its decade-long history, the team won three international titles (2018, 2021, and 2022 Mid-Season Invitationals) and four domestic titles (2016 LPL spring, 2018 LPL spring and Summer, and 2021 and 2022 LPL spring).

The organization also previously had a Dota 2 team which competed in The International 2019 and a tier-one Overwatch team named the Chengdu Hunters.

== League of Legends ==
=== 2013 ===
Royal Club started off the year with their participation in the G-League 2012 Season 2, finished at 3–4th place after losing against Team WE 1–4. They then attended GIGABYTE StarsWar League/Season 2 in March but got knocked out in the group stage. In June, Royal Club finished fifth in 2013 LPL Spring, went 15–13 in the group stage and did not qualify for playoffs. One day after, they participated in the NVIDIA Game Festival 2013 and placed second after losing against Team WE in the finals. In July, Royal HZ took part in StarsWar 8 tournament. They got knocked out in the semifinals, lost 0–2 to iG. At the end of July, they once again lost 0–2 to iG in the semifinals of IEM Season VIII – Shanghai and finished 3–4th. In September, Royal HZ qualified for the Season 3 China Regional Finals after finishing second in the 2013 LPL Summer/Regular Season with a 13–8 record over the season. In the Season 3 China Regional Finals, Royal HZ made an amazing comeback, went from the Loser's bracket to defeat OMG in the Grand Finals, claimed the first place and not only a spot in the Season 3 World Championship but the huge advantage of being seeded directly into the quarterfinals past the group stages.

At the S3 Championship, Royal Club would be a dark horse team in the quarterfinals as they were not as well known outside the Asian scene, and Worlds was their first major tournament in North America. Their first match would be against a team they were exceptionally familiar with from the Chinese league, OMG. In the first match of bracket stage, the two Chinese teams would re-enact the Chinese Regional Finals to see who would advance and who would be eliminated from the tournament. OMG had been seen as one of the strongest teams in the group stage, losing only once to the eventual champions SK Telecom T1, but Royal Club were well prepared going into the match. They defeated their Chinese compatriots in a 2–0 victory, advancing to face Europe's top seed, Fnatic. The series would lead to a back and forth heavy hitting battle between the regions, with Royal able to win the final game, 3–1. Royal Club found themselves in the ultimate spotlight in the grand finals against favored Korean team SK Telecom T1. The anticipated match led to Royal Club being overwhelmed by SK T1, losing 0–3, but taking home a very respectable second place.

After the S3 Championship, Tabe and Wh1t3zZ retired while Lucky became a sub. Uzi then became team captain and briefly tried out other positions such as jungle and mid. In order to prepare for the 2014 IPL Spring, Royal Club significantly changed most of their roster, with many new faces joining the team, including the former LMQ Tian Ci top laner Yao and support Bao.

=== 2014 ===
On 17 May 2014, the previous Owner of Royal Club announced he was stepping down as CEO of the team and giving ownership over to Li Yande (eNO), where the team would be re-branded as Star Horn and take Royal Club's place for the LPL Summer Season.

Royal Club beat LPL team OMG 3–2 in the semi-finals. Royal Club reached the finals of the 2014 League of Legends World Championship and lost to Samsung Galaxy White 3–1.

=== 2015 ===
Star Horn finished tenth in the 2015 LPL Spring Round Robin, eliminating them from the playoffs.

=== 2016 ===
By winning a champion and a second in the spring and summer, RNG qualified for the 2016 World Championship.

=== 2017 ===
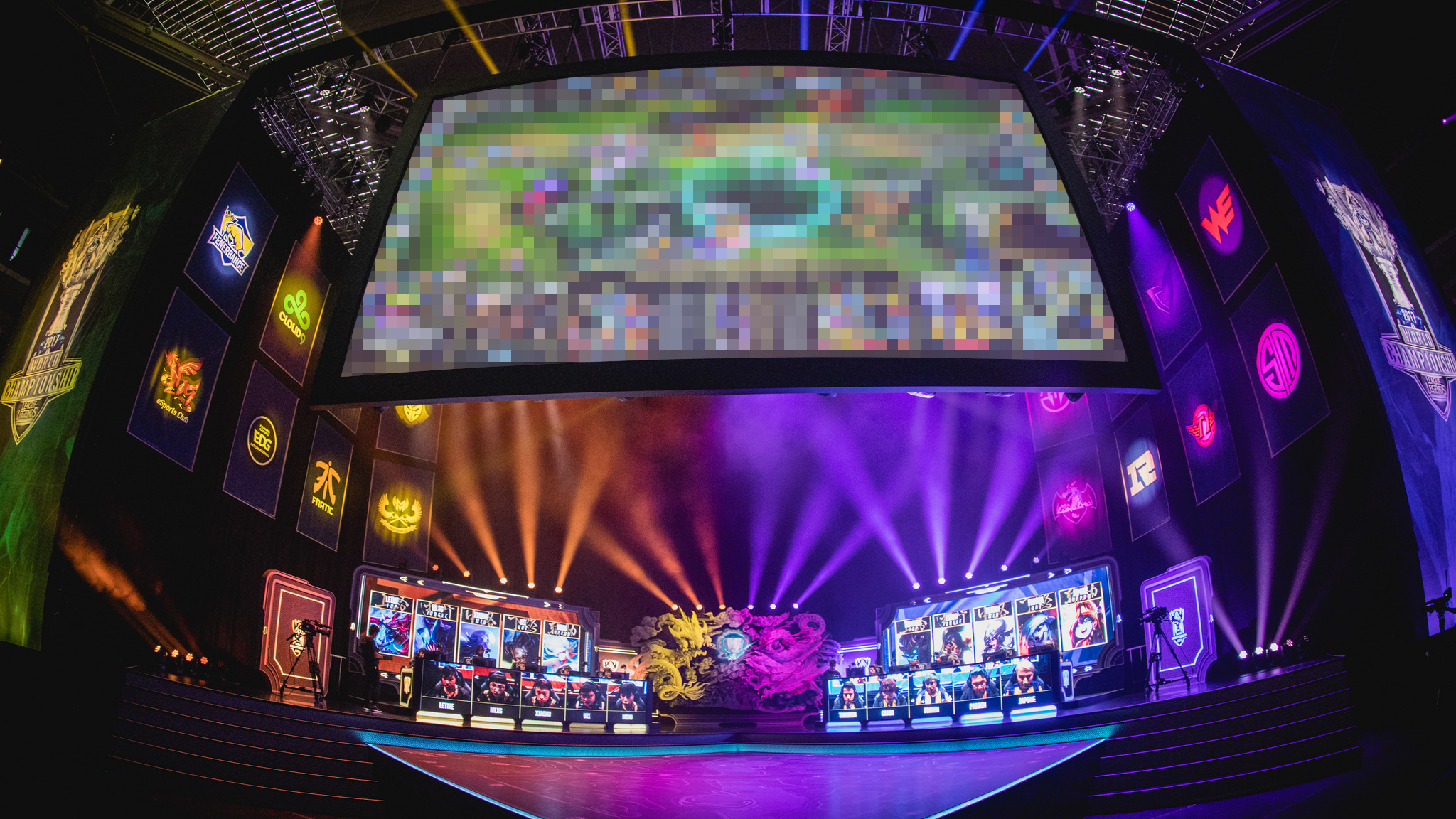
2017 League of Legends World Championship match at the Wuhan Sports Center Gymnasium between RNG and 1907 Fenerbahçe

In the 2017 LPL Spring Season, RNG was placed in the Group A and won first place. In the 2017 LPL Spring Playoffs, RNG defeated EDG in semifinals with a score of 3:1. However, they were beaten by WE in finals with a score of 0:3. They lost the ticket to 2017 Mid-Season Invitational.

In June, RNG won the Demacia Cup Summer 2017 Playoffs in Changsha. In July, RNG helped LPL get its first championship of Rift Rivals. In the 2017 LPL Summer Playoffs, RNG defeated Team WE with a score of 3–2 in semifinals. They were defeated again in the finals by EDG with a score of 2–3.

Although RNG got two runner-ups in spring and summer season, they gained enough points and got the ticket to the 2017 World Championship. RNG was placed in Group C and won first place in the group stage. During their quarterfinals, they defeated FNC with a score of 3–1, and was defeated by SK Telecom T1 in the semifinals.

=== 2018 ===
In the 2018 LPL Spring Playoffs, RNG defeated WE in two rounds. They defeated Invictus Gaming in the semifinals and EDG in the finals. In the 2018 Mid-Season Invitational, the team won first place in the group stage. During the first-place tiebreaker, RNG defeated KZ from LCK with a score of 3–1.

In June, RNG won the championship of Demacia Cup Summer 2018 Playoffs in Zhuhai. In July, RNG helped LPL get the championship of 2018 Rift Rivals. In the 2018 LPL Summer Playoffs, RNG defeated TOP with a score of 3–1.

After summer season, RNG won enough points to become eligible to participate in the 2018 World Championship, and placed first in the group stage. In the knockout stage, RNG lost the quarterfinals against G2.

== Overwatch ==
Awards and achievements
Preceded by LGD Gaming; EDward Gaming; Top Esports	League of Legends Pro League winner Spring 2016; Spring 2018, Summer 2018; Spring 2021	Succeeded by EDward Gaming; Invictus Gaming; EDward Gaming
Preceded by SK Telecom T1; G2 Esports	Mid-Season Invitational winner 2018; 2021; 2022	Succeeded by G2 Esports; JD Gaming
