= Ruler (gamer) =

South Korean esports player (born 1998)

- Ruler in 2026

Personal information
- Name: 박재혁 (Park Jae-hyuk)
- Born: December 29, 1998 (age 27)
- Nationality: South Korean

Current team
- Team: Gen.G
- Role: Bot
- Game: League of Legends
- League: LCK

Career information
- Playing career: 2016–present

Team history
- 2016: Stardust
- 2016–2017: Samsung Galaxy
- 2018–2022: Gen.G (Note: Originally KSV Esports, later rebranded to Gen.G.)
- 2023–2024: JD Gaming
- 2025–present: Gen.G

Career highlights and awards
- World champion (2017); Worlds MVP (2017); 2× MSI champion (2023, 2025); Esports World Cup champion (2025); 3× LCK champion; 2x LCK Finals MVP; LCK Season MVP; 3× LCK All-Pro First Team; 2× LCK Bot Laner of the Year; LCK Cup champion (2026); 2× LPL champion; LPL Finals MVP; 2× LPL All-Pro First Team; No. 1 retired by Gen.G
Medal record
Esports
Representing South Korea
Asian Games
Gold medal – first place	2022 Hangzhou	League of Legends
Silver medal – second place	2018 Jakarta – Palembang	League of Legends

Park Jae-hyuk (Korean: 박재혁; born December 29, 1998), better known as Ruler, is a South Korean professional League of Legends player for Gen.G. Throughout his career, he has won three League of Legends Champions Korea (LCK) titles, two League of Legends Pro League (LPL) titles, two Mid-Season Invitational (MSI) titles, and one World Championship title. He is considered one of the greatest marksman players of all time.

His career began in 2016 when he joined LCK Challengers League team Stardust. Later that year, he joined Samsung Galaxy of the LCK. He reached the 2016 League of Legends World Championship Final in his rookie season, and the following year, he won the 2017 World Championship. Ruler was picked up by KSV Esports, which was later rebranded to Gen.G, for the 2018 LCK season. From 2018 to 2022, he won one LCK title, in 2022 and made four World Championship appearances. He left the LCK to join LPL team JD Gaming for the 2023 season. In his first year, he won back-to-back LPL titles, won the 2023 Mid-Season Invitational, and made another Worlds appearance. Ruler parted ways with JD Gaming and signed back with Gen.G for the 2025 season in which he won the 2025 Mid-Season Invitational. He also represented the South Korean national team at the 2018 Asian Games, earning a silver medal, and the 2022 Asian Games, earning a gold. Ruler is the only other player aside from Deft that has won the LCK, LPL, MSI and Worlds.

Ruler's individual accomplishments include accolades such as a World Championship Most Valuable Player (MVP) award, an LCK season MVP award, three LCK First All-Pro Team designations, an LPL Finals MVP award, and two LPL First All-Pro Team designations. He also became the 11th player in the LCK to reach 1,000 kills, and the third to reach 2,000.

== Professional career ==
=== Early career (2016) ===
Ruler began his playing career in 2016 when he joined Stardust of Challengers Korea, a developmental league for the League of Legends Champions Korea (LCK).

=== Samsung Galaxy (2016–2017) ===
Ruler was signed by Samsung Galaxy (SSG) for the 2016 LCK Summer Split. SSG finished the split in fourth place in the standings. In the first round of the playoffs, SSG defeated Afreeca Freecs. Their opponents in the next round was KT Rolster, whom they lost to 0 games to 3, ending their playoff run. Accumulating 50 championship points, SSG entered the LCK regional qualifier for the 2016 World Championship. They secured the third LCK seed for Worlds by defeating KT Rolster in the finals. After advancing as the top seed from their group, SSG swept both Cloud9 and H2k-Gaming in the playoffs, earning a spot in the final against SK Telecom T1 (SKT). In the best-of five series, SKT won the first two games. After 25 minutes into in game three, SSG was losing 0–7, but four minutes later, SSG won a 3–0 fight due in part to Ruler's high damage output. Samsung went on to win the game 19–17 after 71 minutes. Following a win in game four, the match went to a decisive fifth game. Eight minutes in, Ruler killed SKT's Bae "Bengi" Sung-woong after a bad invade. However, SSG ultimately lost the game 8–13, finishing Worlds in second place.

After securing third- and fourth-place finishes in the 2017 LCK Spring and Summer splits, respectively, SSG qualified for the 2017 League of Legends World Championship. In the World Championship group stage, Samsung finished with a 4–2 record, with both losses coming from Royal Never Give Up. Progressing to the knockouts, they defeated Longzhu Gaming and Team WE in the quarterfinals and semifinals, respectively, SSG advance to the World Championship finals, where they once again faced SK Telecom T1. In game one of the final, Ruler played Xayah and had no deaths and 100% kill participation, contributing two kills and five assists. This trend continued in the second game, playing as Xayah, he maintained zero deaths, four kills, and five assists. Switching to Varus in the third game, a pivotal moment occurred at the 39-minute mark, when Ruler used a move called Flash, propelling himself toward SKT mid laner Lee "Faker" Sang-hyeok, creating a chaotic situation. However, SKT's players were positioned in a way that created a brief opening, and Ruler took advantage of the opportunity and killed Faker. Although this left Ruler exposed to attack, Jo "CoreJJ" Yong-in used all of his abilities to keep Ruler alive, and with a miscalculated attack by SKT's Kang "Blank" Sun-gu, Ruler survived. While falling just short of 100% kill participation in the third game, Ruler concluded with four kills, two deaths, and 11 assists. With a 3-game-to-0 series victory, Ruler won his first World Championship. Throughout the series, Ruler adeptly managed minion waves, secured kills, and contributed to tower takedowns. Despite occasional mistakes, Ruler's team collaborated effectively to rectify them, and Ruler earned the MVP title for the series.

=== Gen.G (2018–2022) ===
In November 2017, KSV Esports, later rebranded as Gen.G in May 2018, acquired the roster of Samsung Galaxy. The team finished with a 9–9 record, securing qualification for the 2018 LCK Spring playoffs. However, they faced an early exit in the first round, losing to SK Telecom T1. In the subsequent summer split, Gen.G finished with a 13–5 record, earning another playoff berth. Their first playoff opponent was Afreeca Freecs, and despite their efforts, Gen.G faced a 0–2 defeat, with Afreeca effectively limiting Ruler's production throughout the match. Following a victory against Kingzone DragonX in the 2018 LCK regional qualifier finals, Ruler and the team qualified for the 2018 World Championship. However, they were unable to advance beyond the group stage, marking the end of their journey in the tournament. However, the team was eliminated in the group stage.

Gen.G struggled throughout the 2019 LCK season. They finished the spring split in seventh place with a 5–13 record, followed by a sixth-place finish in the summer with a 10–8 record. They failed to reach the playoffs in either split. In a 2022 interview, Ruler expressed that the 2019 season marked the most challenging period in his career as a player. During this time, he contemplated the possibility of retirement.

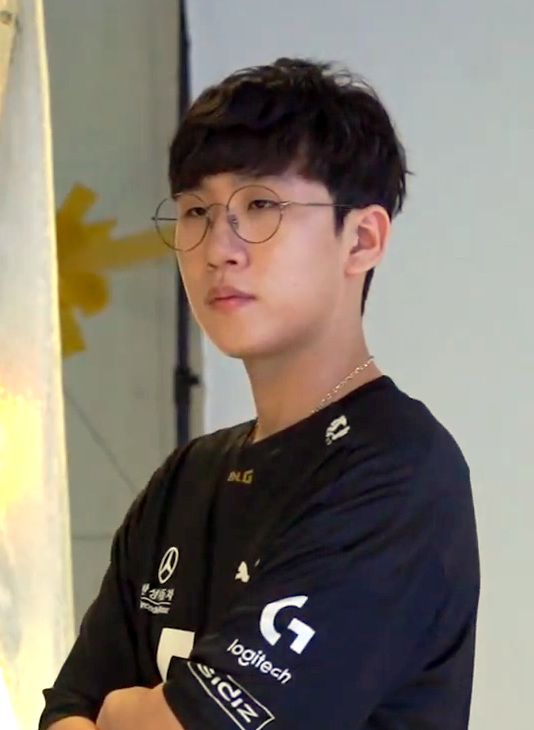
Ruler in 2020

Following a challenging year, Gen.G made significant changes by releasing eight of their ten players. However, they retained Ruler, signing him to a three-year contract extension on September 22, 2019. The team built their 2020 roster around Ruler, who played a pivotal role in attracting top free agent Kim "Clid" Tae-min to join the team in the offseason. On April 1, 2020, during a match against T1, Ruler achieved a milestone by becoming the 11th player in LCK history to secure 1,000 kills. Gen.G performed well in the regular season, finishing atop the standings with a 14–4 record and advancing directly to the 2020 LCK Spring Finals. Despite a strong regular season, Gen.G faced T1 in the final but lost by a score of 0–3. In the summer split, Gen.G maintained their momentum with another 14–4 record, securing a third-place standing. Ruler's performance throughout the season earned him a spot on the 2020 Summer LCK First All-Pro team. During the playoffs, the team reached the semifinals but were defeated by DRX. To qualify for the 2020 World Championship, Gen.G competed in the LCK regional qualifiers, making it to the final against T1. Ruler's contributions, including playing as Senna in the first match and Ezreal in the second with a quadra-kill late in the game, helped secure victories. Gen.G went on to win the third match and clinched the third LCK seed for the World Championship. The team advanced past the group stage of the event and faced G2 Esports in the quarterfinals. After losing the first game, Gen.G got off to a quick start in game two, with Ruler getting a double kill right after Martin "Wunder" Nordahl Hansen claimed first blood. However, G2 quickly took over and won the game. The team showed signs of life in game three, with Ruler visibly trying to bring the match to a fourth game. However, G2 won the game and the match, ending Gen.G's run.

In the 2021 LCK Spring Split regular season, Gen.G secured a second-place finish with a 13–5 record. Ruler was named to the 2021 Spring LCK First All-Pro team, leading all bot laners in damage per minute, KDA, and gold per minute. Additionally, he led in damage share, with an average contribution of 31.3% to Gen.G's overall damage per game. Despite their impressive regular-season performance, Gen.G fell short in the playoff final, losing to DWG KIA. In the subsequent summer split, Gen.G continued their solid performance, finishing in second place with a 12–6 record. While they lost to T1 in the playoff semifinals, the team had already secured qualification for the 2021 World Championship, marking Ruler's fifth appearance. While the team successfully advanced out of the group stage and into the knockouts, Gen.G fell to EDward Gaming in the semifinals.

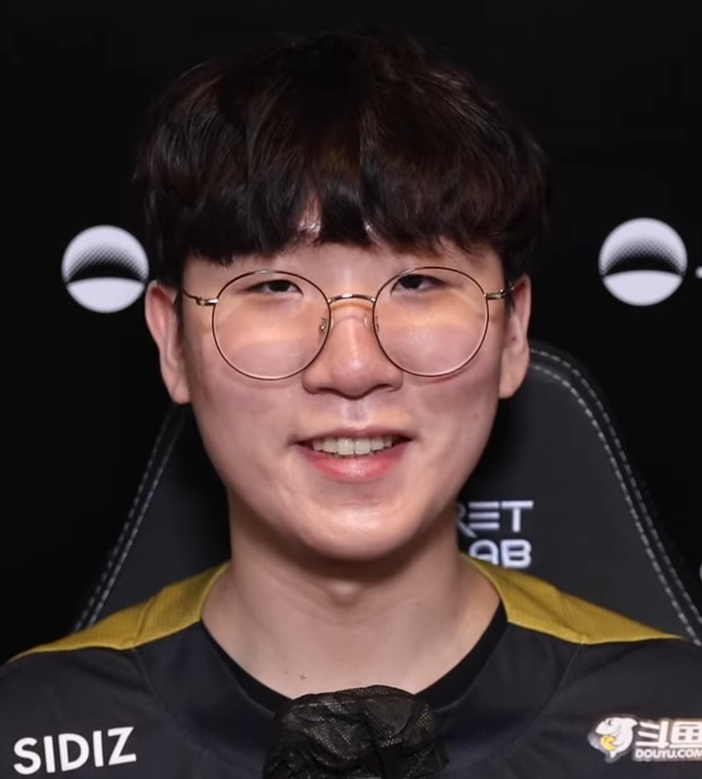
Ruler in a 2022 interview

In the 2022 LCK Spring Split, Gen.G finished with a 15–3 record. They reached the 2022 LCK Spring Finals but were defeated by T1 with a score of 1–3. In July 2022, during a match against Liiv Sandbox in the 2022 Summer Split, Ruler achieved his 2,000th kill in the LCK, becoming the third player in LCK history to reach this milestone, behind Lee "Faker" Sang-hyeok and Kim "Deft" Hyuk-kyu. During the 2022 LCK Summer Split, Gen.G performed well with a 17–1 record, becoming the third team in LCK history to win 17 or more matches in a single split. Moreover, the team had an 87.5% game record record — the highest percentage in LCK history. Ruler was named the MVP of the 2022 LCK Summer Split, earning 21 of the 40 first-place votes cast by LCK commentators, players, coaches, and affiliated media members. He had the highest KDA among all LCK players at 7.6 and tied Liiv Sandbox's Lee "Prince" Chae-hwan for the most kills at 213. He was also tied with Prince for the most "Player of the Game" awards. Ruler, along with three of his teammates, earned a spot on the 2022 Summer LCK All-Pro First Team. Gen.G secured a spot in the 2022 LCK Summer Finals, where they faced T1 on August 28. In the first game, Ruler had 16 kills, contributing to Gen.G's victory with a final kill score of 19 to 6. The team went on to win the series 3–0, granting Ruler his first LCK title and securing Gen.G the top LCK seed in the 2022 World Championship. In the World Championship, Gen.G advanced past the group stage and faced DWG KIA in the knockout quarterfinals. Gen.G won the first two games of the match, but DWG came back to win the following two, bringing the match to a decisive fifth game. Late into game five, the game was tied. In the final teamfight, Ruler secured a game-winning quadra-kill, pushing Gen.G to the win and advancing them to the semifinals. They faced DRX in the semifinals, a team they had not lost to all year. However, DRX won the match, 3 games to 1, ending Gen.G's Worlds run.

On November 10, 2022, Ruler mutually parted ways with Gen.G. Following his departure, Gen.G retired Ruler's uniform number 1.

=== JD Gaming (2023–2024) ===
Ruler joined JD Gaming (JDG) of the Chinese League of Legends Pro League (LPL) for the 2023 season. In his debut LPL match on January 14, 2023, against Bilibili Gaming, Ruler achieved a pentakill, marking his seventh in his career. The play involved Ruler initiating the skirmish by eliminating top laner Bin. Subsequently, he cornered the support player, ON, near his team's inhibitor, securing the fifth kill for the pentakill. ON conceded to Ruler in a gesture of sportsmanship. Ruler's performance throughout the regular season earned him a spot on the 2023 Spring LPL First All-Pro Team. In the playoffs, JDG reached the 2023 LPL Spring Split Final, where they faced Bilibili Gaming. JDG won the match, 3 games to 0, earning Ruler his first LPL title. Throughout the series, Ruler contributed with 19 kills, 4 deaths, and 26 assists, and was named the MVP of the finals. In the 2023 Mid-Season Invitational, JDG won their upper bracket quarterfinals against Bilibili Gaming on May 14. Ruler played a pivotal role, securing 10 kills in game one and 15 kills in game three, contributing to JDG's 3–0 victory. The team continued their success by defeating T1 in the upper bracket semifinals with a 3–2 score. Ruler finished the match with 28 kills and 17 assists. JDG went on to win the 2023 MSI Final against BiliBili, securing Ruler his first MSI title. At the end of the 2023 LPL Summer Split regular season, Ruler earned a spot on the 2023 Summer LPL First All-Pro Team. In the playoffs, JDG secured a 3–2 victory over LNG Esports in the 2023 LPL Summer Finals, achieving back-to-back LPL titles. With this win, JDG qualified as the top seed LPL representative in the 2023 World Championship. Having won both LPL titles, the MSI, and the 2023 Asian Games, Ruler and teammate Seo "Kanavi" Jin-hyeok had the opportunity to become the first players in history to win every event they had attended in a calendar year, should they win the 2023 World Championship. However, JDG were eliminated in the Worlds semifinals by T1, losing by a score of 1–3.

In November 2023, JDG re-signed Ruler on a two-year contract.

=== Return to Gen.G (2025–present) ===
On November 20, 2024 it was announced that Ruler would be returning to Gen.G for the 2025 season on a three-year contract. Upon his return, he was appointed captain of the team for the 2025 season due to his experience and long history with Gen.G. Ruler went on to win his second 2025 Mid-Season Invitational title making him the first player in history to win an MSI titles with two different teams from two different regions. In the same season he won his first Esports World Cup title and his second LCK championship. With his performance in the LCK finals, he earned his first LCK finals MVP.

== National team career ==
Ruler represented South Korea in the League of Legends demonstration event at the 2018 Asian Games. Held at the BritAma Arena at Mahaka Square in Jakarta, Indonesia, from August 27 to 29, 2018, the South Korean team secured a silver medal following a 1–3 loss to China in the finals.

Ruler once again represented South Korea in the 2022 Asian Games one of the six members in the League of Legends division of the South Korea national esports team. Ruler clinched a gold medal as South Korea emerged victorious against Saudi Arabia, China, and Chinese Taipei in the quarterfinals, semifinals, and finals, respectively. With the gold medal, Ruler received an exemption from mandatory military service.

== Player profile ==
Upon joining the LCK in 2016, Ruler faced criticism for his limited champion pool. While he excelled on his signature picks, such as Varus, Jhin and Ezreal, traditional AD carry champions, he appeared to struggle when stepping outside of his comfort zone. In 2018, ESPN highlighted his willingness to learn, citing facing Uzi as key moments in his career.

Over the course of his career, Ruler evolved into a player recognized for his prowess on late-game scaling carry champions, including Aphelios, Jhin, and Jinx. His playstyle centered around prioritizing farm and reaching the late game, where he emerged as the linchpin of Gen.G's damage output in crucial victories. Despite being a prime target for opponents, Ruler showcased exceptional ability in handling dives and gained a reputation for turning teamfights in his team's favor, even when at a deficit. In situations where other ADC players might struggle, Ruler consistently delivered significant damage. Rather than focusing on winning the lane, he prioritized maximizing farm to carry games in the late stages. Ruler's strength lay in his capacity to impact teamfights from a distance, providing him an advantage over most ADCs who adopt a more upfront approach. While occasionally labeled as selfish due to his late-game focus, Ruler's predictable yet effective strategy was a key component of his success.

== Seasons overview ==
Year	Team	Domestic					Regional	International		
Year	Team	League	Split				Rift Rivals	First Stand	Mid-Season Invitational	World Championship
Year	Team	League	Cup	Spring	Summer	Season Playoffs	Rift Rivals	First Stand	Mid-Season Invitational	World Championship
2016	Stardust	CK	—N/a	4th	—	—N/a	—N/a	—N/a	—	—
2016	Samsung Galaxy	LCK	—N/a	—	4th	—N/a	—N/a	—N/a	—	2nd
2017	Samsung Galaxy	LCK	—N/a	3rd	4th	—N/a	2nd	—N/a	Did not qualify	1st
2018	Gen.G	LCK	—N/a	5th	5th	—N/a	Did not qualify	—N/a	Did not qualify	13th–16th
2019	Gen.G	LCK	—N/a	7th	6th	—N/a	Did not qualify	—N/a	Did not qualify	Did not qualify
2020	Gen.G	LCK	—N/a	2nd	3rd	—N/a	—N/a	—N/a	None held (Note: Cancelled due to the COVID-19 pandemic.)	5th–8th
2021	Gen.G	LCK	—N/a	2nd	3rd	—N/a	—N/a	—N/a	Did not qualify	3rd–4th
2022	Gen.G	LCK	—N/a	2nd	1st	—N/a	—N/a	—N/a	Did not qualify	3rd–4th
2023	JD Gaming	LPL	—N/a	1st	1st	—N/a	—N/a	—N/a	1st	3rd–4th
2024	JD Gaming	LPL	—N/a	3rd	7th–8th	—N/a	—N/a	—N/a	Did not qualify	Did not qualify
2025	Gen.G	LCK	2nd	—N/a	—N/a	1st	—N/a	Did not qualify	1st	3rd–4th
2026	Gen.G	LCK	1st	—N/a	—N/a	1st	—N/a	3rd–4th	Did not qualify	2nd

== Awards and honors ==
International

- One-time Worlds champion – 2017
  - One-time Worlds Finals MVP – 2017
- Two-time Mid-Season Invitational champion – 2023, 2025
- One-time Esports World Cup champion – 2025

LCK

- Three-time LCK champion – Summer 2022, Season 2025, Season 2026
- One-time LCK Cup champion – 2026
- Two-time LCK Finals MVP – Season 2025, Season 2026
- One-time LCK Season MVP – Summer 2022
- Two-time LCK Bot Laner of the Year – 2021, 2022
- Three-time LCK All-Pro 1st Team – Summer 2020, Spring 2021, Summer 2022
- Two-time LCK All-Pro 2nd Team – Summer 2021, Spring 2022

LPL

- Two-time LPL champion – Spring 2023, Summer 2023
- One-time LPL Finals MVP – Spring 2023
- Two-time LPL All-Pro 1st Team – Spring 2023, Summer 2023

South Korea Esports

- Asian Games gold medal winner – 2022

== Personal life ==
Ruler was born on December 29, 1998. Initially opposed to Ruler pursuing a career in professional gaming, his father, Park Won-hee, was concerned about Ruler's ability to plan for his future, including a college education. However, he eventually came around and supported Ruler's chosen career path.
