= 2024 League of Legends World Championship final =

League of Legends esports series

2024 League of Legends World Championship Final
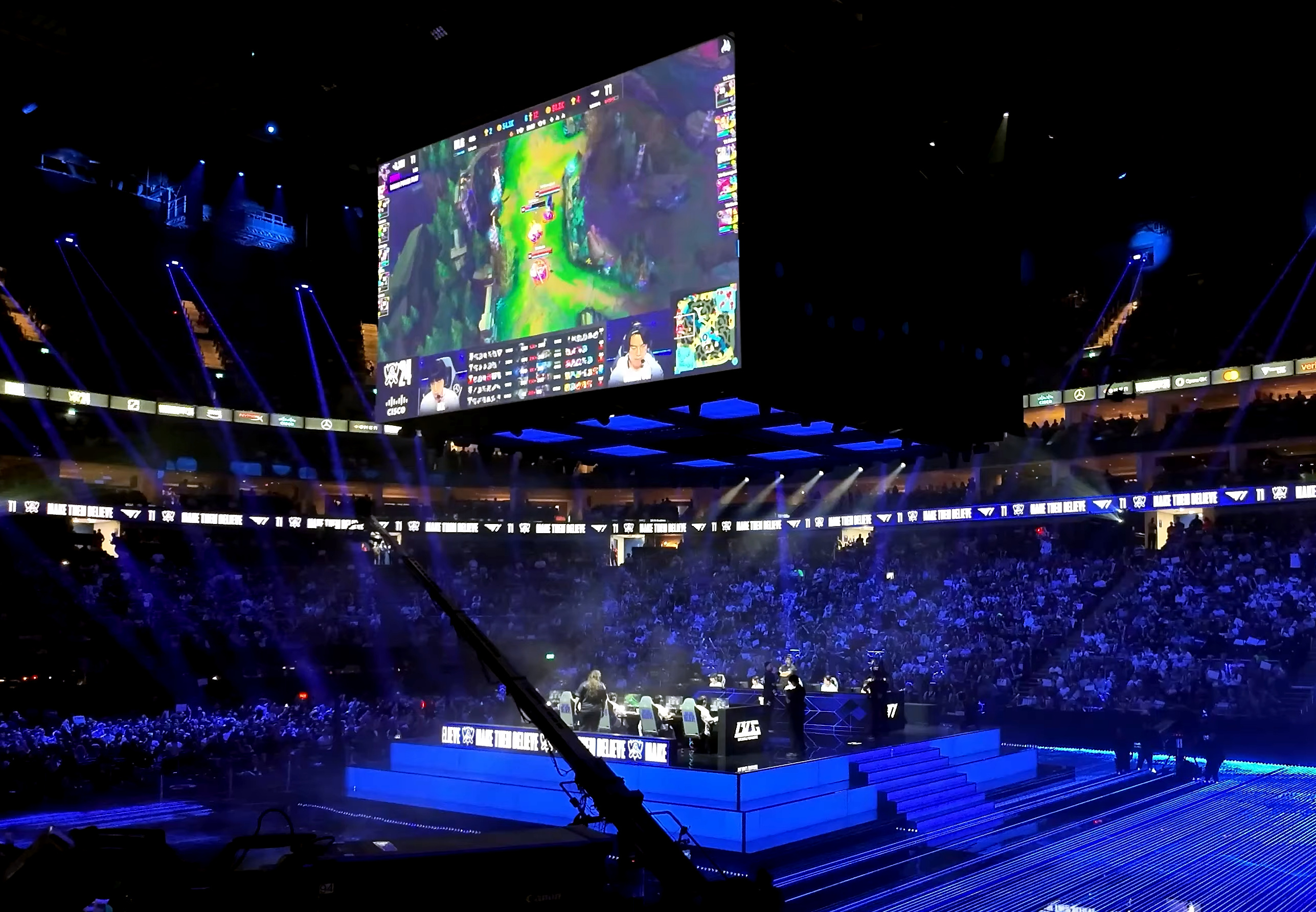
- A scene at The O2 Arena during the match.
T1	BLG
3	2
- Date: 2 November 2024
- Venue: The O2 Arena, London, United Kingdom
- Attendance: 14,700
- MVP: Lee "Faker" Sang-hyeok

Live Broadcast
- Announcers: English; Aaron "Medic" Chamberlain; Andrew "Vedius" Day; Sam "Kobe" Hartman-Kenzler; Korean; Chun "Caster Jun" Yong-jun; Lee "CloudTemplar" Hyun-woo; Jeong "NoFe" No-chul; Chinese; Guan "Zeyuan" Zeyuan; Wang "Remember" Chi-te; Qian "Mile" Chen
- Viewers: 6.9 million (peak excluding China)

The 2024 League of Legends World Championship Final was a League of Legends (LoL) esports series between Bilibili Gaming and T1 on 2 November 2024 at The O2 Arena in London, England, marking the fourteenth final of a LoL World Championship and the final championship series to take place under the two-split competitive calendar as a new split structure and competitive calendar for the game's esports ecosystem was implemented by the game's developer Riot Games since 2025.

It was the third straight final for T1, who entered the series as defending champions, having won the 2023 edition on home soil. T1 were one of four Korean representatives from the League of Legends Champions Korea at the 2024 tournament, the others being 2024 Mid-Season Invitational champions Gen.G, Hanwha Life Esports, and Dplus Kia. Bilibili Gaming were one of four Chinese representatives from the League of Legends Pro League alongside Top Esports, LNG Esports, and 2023 finalists Weibo Gaming.

The series was a best of five and was played in front of 14,700 spectators, with 6.9 million peak viewers excluding China, the highest in the tournament's and in esports history. That also made it just the second esports tournament to pass the 6 million peak viewer mark. The series ended 3–2 in favor of T1, who mounted a comeback of two consecutive victories after facing a 1–2 series deficit after three games.

Lee "Faker" Sang-hyeok earned his fifth World Championship and his second Most Valuable Player honors. The series also marked the fifth World Championship for T1, having won previously in 2013, 2015, 2016, and 2023. It also marked the first successful championship defense of a defending world champion since 2016 when then-SK Telecom T1 clinched back-to-back titles, and the second time the LCK's fourth seed clinched the world championship since DRX in 2022.

== Route to the final ==
=== T1 ===
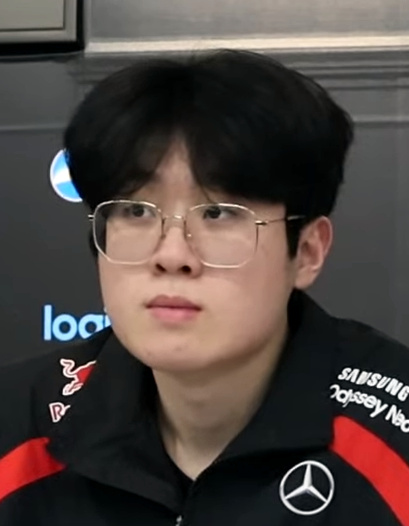
2023 Worlds Finals MVP Zeus in a January 2024 interview.

Prior to the 2023 League of Legends World Championship, T1 was in the midst of an international title drought since the 2017 Mid-Season Invitational, with their last world championship having been their 3–2 victory over Samsung Galaxy in the 2016 edition, when they were then known as SK Telecom T1. However, the organization would return to a world championship final in 2022—their first being known as T1, where they went up against fellow League of Legends Champions Korea representatives DRX. After having a 2–1 series lead, T1 would lose the next two games, ending in a 2–3 defeat to DRX, whom many consider to have completed a "cinderella run," having qualified for the tournament's main stage through the play-in phase. Following the defeat, T1 kept the same roster for the 2023 LCK season, finishing as runners-up in both Spring and Summer Splits and making the semifinals of the 2023 Mid-Season Invitational in London. The organization had the most championship points, securing qualification for the 2023 edition of Worlds despite not having a domestic title.

During the 2023 World Championship, T1 finished their Swiss stage campaign with a 3–1 record, losing only to the LCK's first seed, Gen.G in the 1–0 bracket. Having qualified for the knockout stage, T1 went through teams from the LPL, winning against LNG Esports in a 3–0 sweep in the quarterfinals, defeating 2023 Mid-Season Invitational champions JD Gaming in the semifinals, 3–1, in a rematch from the 2022 edition, and scoring a 3–0 sweep against Weibo Gaming in the finals to win their record-extending fourth world championship in their sixth finals appearance. Top-laner Choi "Zeus" Woo-je would earn Finals MVP honors, being the second straight top-laner to win the award after Hwang "Kingen" Seong-hoon achieved the feat in 2022. Additionally, T1 was also famously the only team from the LCK to qualify for the semifinals, as fellow quarterfinalists Gen.G and KT Rolster failed to advance, losing to Bilibili Gaming and JD Gaming, respectively.

Heading into the 2024 LCK season, T1 retained the same group of players for its world championship defense. Despite losing their opening series to Gen.G, T1 ended up being one of the top teams during the Spring Split, finishing with a 15–3 win-loss slate. In the playoffs, T1 began in the upper bracket, but suffered a 0–3 sweep against Hanwha Life Esports, relegating them to the lower bracket. In the said phase, T1 went 6–1 in games (winning 3–0 against Dplus Kia and 3–1 against Hanwha Life Esports) to advance to the Spring Finals against Gen.G, securing qualification for the 2024 Mid-Season Invitational in the process. In the finals, T1 secured match point after three games with a 2–1 advantage, but would drop the next two games, losing 2–3 to Gen.G, who clinched their fourth consecutive LCK championship dating back to their Spring and Summer titles during the 2023 LCK season and the Summer title during the 2022 campaign. The finals defeat meant that T1 were the LCK's #2 seed at MSI and would have to start the tournament in the play-in stage. In the 2024 Mid-Season Invitational in Chengdu, T1 would qualify for the bracket stage from the play-in stage with 2–0 wins against Estral Esports and FlyQuest. Having qualified for the main stage of the competition, the team secured a nail-biting 3–2 victory over G2 Esports but suffered a 1–3 loss to Bilibili Gaming (BLG) to relegate them to the lower bracket. T1 would secure a 3–1 win over Team Liquid and a 3–0 sweep against G2. BLG were also relegated to lower bracket after their 1–3 loss to Gen.G, which meant that both T1 and BLG would face each other in the lower bracket final with a spot in the MSI Finals on the line. Despite equalizing the series at two games apiece to force a deciding fifth game, T1 eventually lost to BLG and finished third in the standings.

After MSI 2024, the Summer Split commenced. Here, T1 would have a 5–5 win-loss slate after the first five weeks but would go on to have a 6–2 record in their last eight games to finish the split, 11–7, placing fourth upon the completing of the regular season. The squad would win their first playoff best-of-five series against KT Rolster, but suffered another 0–3 loss to Hanwha Life Esports, relegating them to the lower bracket in a similar situation as the previous split. After winning their first lower bracket series against Dplus Kia, T1 faced Hanwha Life once more in the lower bracket final, which ended in a 1–3 defeat for T1. Hanwha Life Esports would secure their qualification for the 2024 edition of Worlds and eventually win the LCK Summer Split title, defeating Gen.G, 3–2, to deny the latter's fifth consecutive title. After the domestic season, T1 still had a chance to make it to the 2024 World Championship through the LCK Regional Finals, which determined the third and fourth seeds from the LCK to qualify for Worlds. The team was drawn into the upper-bracket semifinal against Dplus Kia, and secured match point after three games. However, Dplus Kia would win the next two games, securing the third LCK seed for Worlds. T1 now had to face KT Rolster, who had defeated FearX in the lower bracket semifinals. The final matchup would see T1 become the final team to qualify for the World Championship after a 3–2 series win that saw every blue side team win.

T1 lost its first best-of-one Swiss stage assignment of the tournament to Top Esports but got their first win of the tournament against paiN Gaming to improve their record at 1–1. The team would then be drawn to face BLG in the next round, and secured a best-of-one victory, putting them one win away from the quarterfinals. T1 would meet G2 in the 2–1 bracket and won the series, 2–0, to qualify for the quarterfinals. In the knockout stage, they would avenge their first round defeat to Top Esports with a 3–0 sweep, before beating Gen.G for the first time all year in the semifinals to end their losing streak against them and to book their third consecutive trip to the League of Legends World Championship Final.

T1's route to the final
Round	Opponent	Result
Swiss round 1	Top Esports	0–1
Swiss round 2	PaiN Gaming	1–0
Swiss round 3	Bilibili Gaming	1–0
Swiss round 4	G2 Esports	2–0
Quarterfinals	Top Esports	3–0
Semifinals	Gen.G	3–1

=== BLG ===
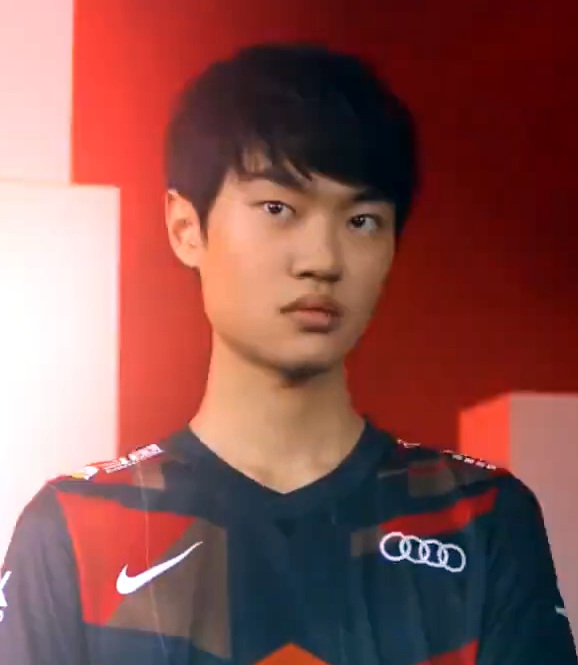
Knight was the 2024 LPL Spring MVP

Bilibili Gaming was founded in 2017 and entered the League of Legends Pro League in the same year, with their acquisition of LPL team I May. The organization's first LPL split saw the team winning its first two matches, before delivering mixed results to finish the Spring split with an 11–8 in the West Region, when the LPL was split into two regions at the time. BLG's first playoff appearance saw them winning their first best-of-five series against JD Gaming, but would lose in five games to Rogue Warriors (now known as Anyone's Legend). Since then, the team has constantly stayed in the middle of the standings and would struggle to go deeper into the playoffs.

Following the 2022 LPL season, the team saw major roster changes, with jungler Peng "Xun" Lixun transferring from Invictus Gaming, ADC Zhao "Elk" Jiahao joining as its new midlaner from Ultra Prime Esports, and support Luo "ON" Wenjun switching teams after his brief stint with Weibo Gaming. Prior to these changes, toplaner Chen "Bin" Zebin had already joined the team for its 2022 Summer Split campaign, transferring from Royal Never Give Up. The newly revamped roster would have immediate success in the 2023 Spring Split, as despite finishing the regular season with a 10–6 win-loss slate, the team would go on a deep run in the playoffs, including a victory against 2021 World Champions Edward Gaming (3–0) in the semifinals to make their first-ever domestic final and qualification for the 2023 Mid-Season Invitational. However, they would suffer a 1–3 loss to JD Gaming in the Spring Finals. During MSI 2023, BLG secured a semifinal win against eventual world champions T1, but would lose in the Final to JD Gaming with a similar scoreline as their last domestic finals, 1–3.

In the Summer Split, BLG had a dominant 15–1 record to place atop the standings, with their only loss coming against JD Gaming during the third week of competition. With their record, the team started their playoff run in the fourth round, securing a 3–1 series win against Top Esports to advance to the upper bracket final. However, they would lose to eventual champions JD Gaming in a 0–3 sweep and suffered a 1–3 defeat to LNG Esports in the lower bracket final. Despite the two losses, BLG secured qualification to its first World Championship. During the 2023 edition of Worlds, BLG won their first matchup against KT Rolster, but lost to JD Gaming in the second round to put them at a 1–1 slate after two games. The team would secure another victory against Fnatic, improving to 2–1 with one series win away from the quarterfinals, but they would lose to eventual champions T1 in the next round. However, BLG would go on to make the quarterfinals after their 2–1 victory over G2 in their final Swiss stage series. In the knockout stage, the team was drawn against LCK champions Gen.G and secured a five-game victory, 3–2. However, BLG would suffer a five-game defeat in the semi-finals to Weibo Gaming.

Heading into the 2024 LPL season, BLG signed midlaner Zhuo "knight" Ding from JD Gaming. Throughout the Spring and Summer Splits, BLG was the best team in the league. In Spring, the team finished the regular season with a 15–1 win-loss record and went undefeated in the playoffs, defeating Ninjas in Pyjamas, 3–1, in the fourth round, and secured a 3–2 victory over Top Esports to book their Finals berth and qualification for the 2024 Mid-Season Invitational. The latter team would beat JD Gaming in the lower bracket finals, setting up a rematch against BLG, who would repeat as victors with a 3–1 win to nab their first LPL championship. During MSI 2024 in Chengdu, BLG began their tournament in the bracket stage, defeating PSG Talon in a nail-biting 3–2 series before winning against T1 with a 3–1 scoreline to advance to the upper bracket final against Gen.G. Despite BLG losing in the upper bracket final, they would repeat their victory against T1, this time with a 3–2 scoreline, to set up a rematch against Gen.G in the Final. However, the squad suffered a 1–3 loss to Gen.G, who would win their first international title.

In the Summer Split, BLG finished with a 7–1 win-loss slate in Group Ascend, placing joint-first alongside LNG Esports who also finished with a similar record. The team commenced the playoffs in the fourth round, much like the Spring Split, and went undefeated on their road to the Summer championship, with victories over Top Esports in the upper bracket finals and Weibo Gaming in both the fourth round and the Final itself to win their second domestic title and the LPL's first seed at the 2024 World Championship.

BLG won their first game against MAD Lions KOI in the first round of the tournament's Swiss stage. However, they would suffer two consecutive defeats against LNG Esports and T1, putting their record at 1–2 with a one series loss away from elimination. Staving off such a situation, BLG secured two best-of-three series wins against PSG and G2 to advance to the knockout stage. In the quarterfinals, the team nailed an upset against LCK Summer champions Hanwha Life Esports, 3–1, and secured a 3–0 sweep against 2023 finalists Weibo Gaming to advance to their first League of Legends World Championship Final.

BLG's route to the final
Round	Opponent	Result
Swiss round 1	MAD Lions KOI	1–0
Swiss round 2	LNG Esports	0–1
Swiss round 3	T1	0–1
Swiss round 4	PSG Talon	2–0
Swiss round 5	G2 Esports	2–1
Quarterfinals	Hanwha Life Esports	3–1
Semifinals	Weibo Gaming	3–0

== Background and pre-series ==
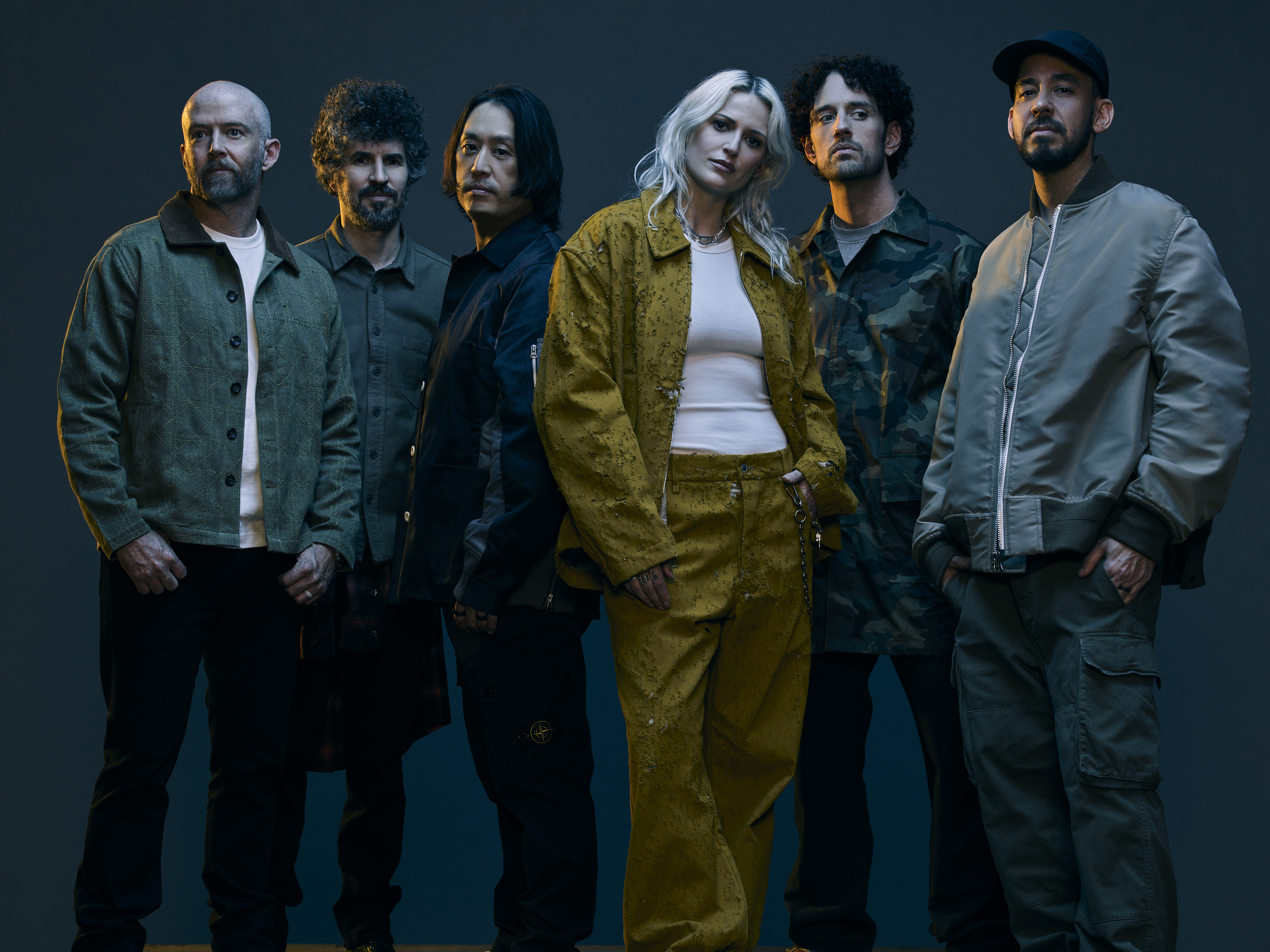
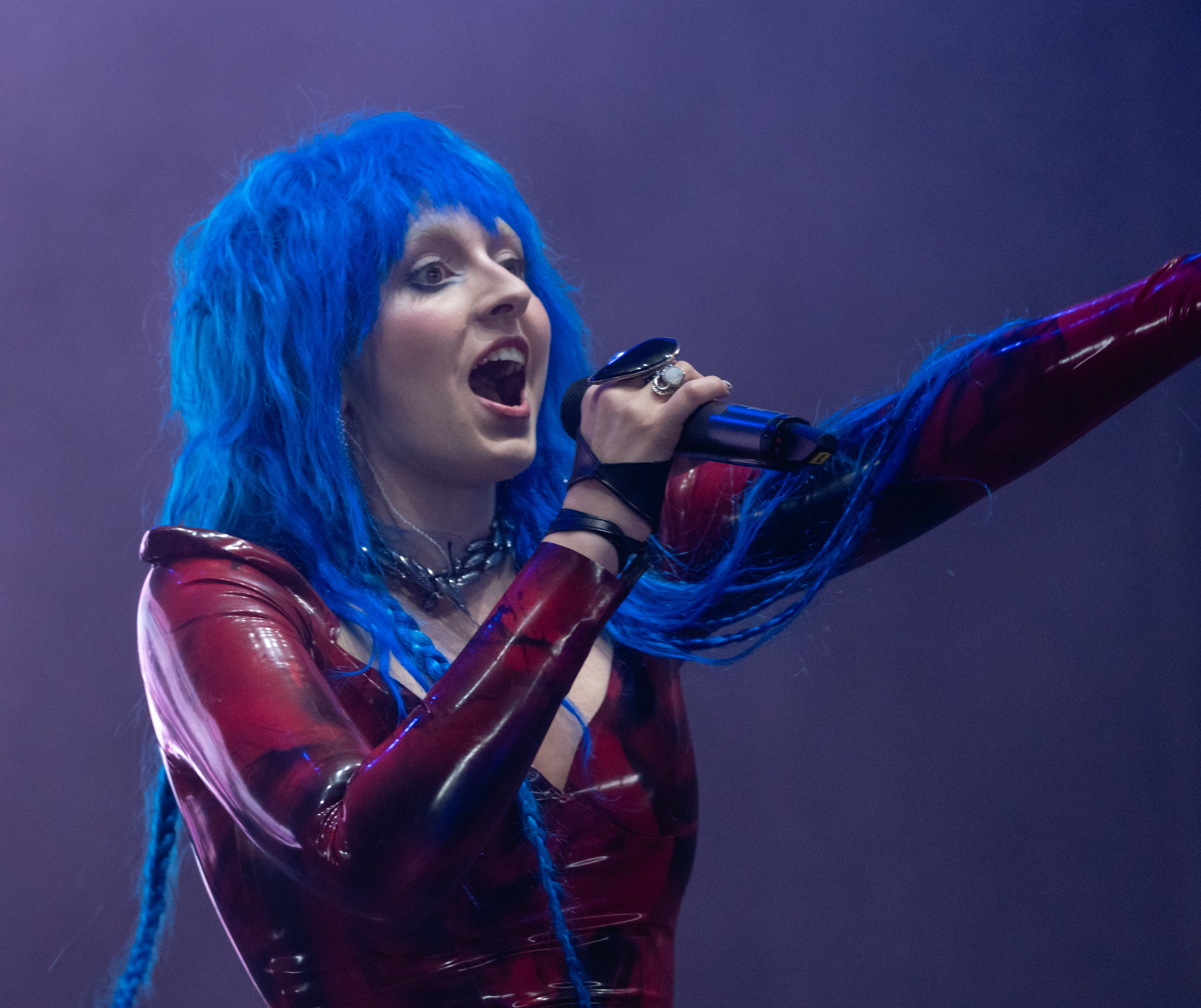
Linkin Park and Ashnikko performed during the opening ceremony.

T1 and BLG were representatives of the LCK and LPL, respectively. This series marked the third time both teams met in a best-of-five series during an international competition in 2024, having faced each other twice during the 2024 Mid-Season Invitational's bracket stage. This was T1's third consecutive Worlds Finals appearance dating back to the 2022 edition, while this was BLG's first as an organization, despite having made two-straight MSI Finals in 2023 and 2024. Moreover, this was the second Finals appearance for Chen "Bin" Zebin, who made his first appearance during the 2020 League of Legends World Championship Final in Shanghai as part of Suning (now known as Weibo Gaming).

The series was held on 2 November 2024 at The O2 Arena in London, United Kingdom. On 19 November 2023, Riot Games announced during the finals' broadcast of the 2023 World Championship, that the Final of Worlds 2024 would take place at the venue. The event was livestreamed via Twitch.tv and YouTube, as well as through the official LoL Esports website. Prior to the commencement of the games, Riot held an opening ceremony featuring performances from musical artists who had collaborated with League of Legends throughout the year. This began at 14:00 local time (UTC+01:00). The ceremony began with a performance of "Paint the Town Blue" by American singer Ashnikko, released as the lead single for the soundtrack to the second and final season of Arcane, which was released on Netflix on 9 November 2024, and ended on 23 November. German singer Tiffany Aris and Mars Atlas of American-based band Forts then followed with a rendition of "Still Here", which was released in conjunction with the start of the game's fourteenth season (the players were first presented to the crowd midway into the song). Linkin Park were the last to take the stage with a performance of "Heavy Is the Crown", the official theme song of the tournament. In between the song, the Summoner's Cup was unveiled at centre stage, with Mike Shinoda introducing the players from BLG and T1 according to their roles. This was Linkin Park's second time performing the song at the O2 Arena, having held a stop of the band's current concert tour a day after the song was released.

The English language streams were cast by Aaron "Medic" Chamberlain and Andrew "Vedius" Day of the League of Legends EMEA Championship and Sam "Kobe" Hartman-Kenzler of the League Championship Series (then known as League of Legends Championship of The Americas before the revert to LCS in September 2025). The Korean language streams were cast by Chun "Caster Jun" Yong-jun, Lee "CloudTemplar" Hyun-woo, and Jeong "NoFe" No-chul of the League of Legends Champions Korea. Chinese commentary was provided by Guan "Zeyuan" Zeyuan, Wang "Remember" Chi-te, and Qian "Mile" Chen of the League of Legends Pro League.

=== Team line-ups ===
Neither team made any line-up changes going into the finals. T1's coach was Kim "KkOma" Jeong-gyun, while BLG's coach was Fu "BigWei" Chien-wei.

Role	T1	BLG
Top-Lane	Choi "Zeus" Woo-je	Chen "Bin" Zebin
Jungle	Mun "Oner" Hyeon-jun	Peng "Xun" Lixun
Mid-Lane	Lee "Faker" Sang-hyeok	Zhuo "knight" Ding
Bottom-Lane	Lee "Gumayusi" Min-hyeong	Zhao "Elk" Jiahao
Support	Ryu "Keria" Min-seok	Luo "ON" Wenjun

== Series ==
=== Game 1 ===
Game 1 Team Compositions
Role	T1	BLG
Top	Gnar	Rumble
Jungle	Sejuani	Skarner
Middle	Yone	Sylas
ADC	Caitlyn	Ashe
Support	Braum	Rell

The champion selection phase for the first game commenced shortly after the conclusion of the opening ceremony. T1 were on blue side which gave them the opportunity to ban and pick the first champions of the game. In the first banning phase, T1 opted to ban Jax, Bin's best champion in the tournament with a 7–1 win-loss game record prior, Kai'Sa, and Kalista, while BLG banned Aurora, Vi, which was Oner's best champion at this point in the tournament with an undefeated game record leading up to the final, and Varus. Following the first ban phase, T1 first picked Yone for Faker. BLG responded by selecting Ashe for Elk, and Skarner for Xun. Prior to the first game, Skarner was a champion that was picked 38 times in the tournament, 27 of which resulted in a win. For the remaining picks of the first pick phase, T1 chose Gnar for Zeus, and Sejuani for Oner, with BLG's last pick of the first selection phase being Sylas for Knight, a pick meant to counter T1's first three picks. Before the second pick phase, BLG banned Ziggs and Jhin, while T1 banned Renata Glasc and Rakan. As BLG were on red side, they got the first pick of the second pick phase, selecting Rumble for Bin. For their last two draft selections, T1 selected Caitlyn for Gumayusi and Braum for Keria; while BLG's final pick was Rell for ON.

Game 1 ended with a game time of 27:09 minutes, with a final kill scoreline of 18–3 in favor of BLG.

Game 1	27:09	T1	3	–	18	Bilibili Gaming	London, United Kingdom
		BLG leads series 1–0					The O2 Arena
		K/D/A: 3/18/3; Gold: 46.8K; Turrets: 5 Drakes: 1 Elder Dragons: 0 Barons: 0 Voidgrubs: 2	Game Stats			K/D/A: 18/3/46; Gold: 55.9K; Turrets: 11; Drakes: 3 Elder Dragons: 0 Barons: 1 Voidgrubs: 4	

=== Game 2 ===
Game 2 Team Compositions
Role	T1	BLG
Top	Ornn	Rumble
Jungle	Nocturne	Xin Zhao
Middle	Sylas	Galio
ADC	Kalista	Ashe
Support	Renata Glasc	Rakan

For the first banning phase of the second game, T1 chose to ban Jax and Varus, both for the second time, and Yone; while BLG opted to ban Aurora and Vi, both also for the second consecutive game, and Skarner. Similar to the first game, T1 were on blue side, giving them the chance to select the first champion in the first picking phase, selecting Kalista for Gumayusi, a pick that was deemed questionable considering that Ashe was open, a champion used by Elk in the first game and got the highest number of kills at eight. Ashe was eventually chosen by BLG for Elk once more, followed by Rumble for Bin. In response, T1 selected Renata Glasc for Keria, a champion they banned in the first game; and Sylas for Faker, a pick meant to deny Knight a champion whom he had a statline of four kills and 11 assists with no deaths. BLG concluded the first selection phase by picking Galio for Knight. In the second banning phase, BLG banned Gnar in response to the denial of Sylas, and Sejuani; while T1 chose to ban Kindred in response to the selection of Galio, and Wukong. Still on red side, BLG selected Xin Zhao for Xun and Rakan for ON; and T1 picked Ornn, a champion that has not been selected all throughout the tournament up to that point, and Nocturne to round out their picks.

Game 2 ended with a game time of 27:25 minutes, with a final kill scoreline of 18–3 in favor of T1, a reversal of the first game in terms of kill count.

Game 2	27:25	T1	18	–	3	Bilibili Gaming	London, United Kingdom
		Series tied 1–1					The O2 Arena
		K/D/A: 18/3/45; Gold: 56.0K; Turrets: 9 Drakes: 2 Elder Dragons: 0 Barons: 1 Voidgrubs: 6	Game Stats			K/D/A: 3/18/6; Gold: 40.6K; Turrets: 0 Drakes: 1 Elder Dragons: 0 Barons: 0 Voidgrubs: 0	

=== Game 3 ===
Game 3 Team Compositions
Role	BLG	T1
Top	Rumble	Jax
Jungle	Kindred	Vi
Middle	Galio	Sylas
ADC	Kalista	Xayah
Support	Blitzcrank	Renata Glasc

Now on blue side for the third game, BLG banned Varus, Ashe, and Skarner; while T1 banned Aurora, Yone, and Neeko on red side. BLG's first two bans were meant to target Gumayusi, who had an 8/2/4 K/D/A with Kalista in the second game. The first selection phase of the game saw BLG eventually take Kalista for Elk, denying Gumayusi his best champion in the series by this point but also gave an opportunity for T1 to select Renata Glasc; the latter of which was eventually selected for Keria after Jax's selection for Zeus, marking the first time the said champion was chosen in the series. In response, BLG picked Rumble for Bin for the third consecutive time and Blitzcrank for ON, a pick meant to complement the earlier Kalista selection in the bottom lane. T1's final pick of the first selection phase was Sylas for Faker, which marked the third consecutive time the champion was selected in the series. T1 then banned Akali and Wukong, and BLG banned Sejuani and Draven in response to a potential Draven-Renata Glasc pairing. Beginning the second picking phase, T1 selected Vi for Oner, to which BLG would respond by picking Kindred for Xun, and Galio for Knight. T1 then locked in Xayah for Gumayusi.

Game 3 ended with a game time of 27:35 minutes, with a final kill scoreline of 17–3 in favor of BLG, putting them at one win away from securing the series victory.

Game 3	27:35	Bilibili Gaming	17	–	3	T1	London, United Kingdom
		BLG leads series 2–1					The O2 Arena
		K/D/A: 17/3/45; Gold: 58.1K; Turrets: 11; Drakes: 3 Elder Dragons: 0 Barons: 1 Voidgrubs: 5	Game Stats			K/D/A: 3/17/8; Gold: 44.0K; Turrets: 2 Drakes: 1 Elder Dragons: 0 Barons: 0 Voidgrubs: 1	

=== Game 4 ===
Game 4 Team Compositions
Role	T1	BLG
Top	Rumble	Gnar
Jungle	Poppy	Sejuani
Middle	Sylas	Smolder
ADC	Ashe	Ziggs
Support	Renata Glasc	Rakan

BLG were at match point and a win would seal their first World championship and first international title. Returning to blue side, T1 again had the opportunity to ban and pick the first champions of the game. In the first banning phase, T1 banned Jax, Yone, and Varus, a champion that has been banned for the fourth straight time by this point. For BLG, they opted to ban Aurora, also for the fourth consecutive time; Skarner, and Kalista. T1 began the first picking phase, selecting Ashe for Gumayusi, a champion he used during T1's match-point clinching victory in the semifinal series against Gen.G in the third game, with his highest kill count in a single game in the tournament at seven, along with nine assists. BLG responded by locking in Gnar for Bin, a champion he had a 2–0 game record in the World Championship prior to the finals and was the first time a different championship was selected for him other than Rumble, whom he used for the first three games of the series. Their next pick was Ziggs for Elk. In response, T1 selected Renata Glasc for Keria and for the third consecutive time for Faker, Sylas. BLG ended the first picking phase by selecting Smolder for Knight. Before the second pick phase, BLG banned Vi and Nocturne, a champion Oner had a 6/0/8 KDA in their Game 2 victory; while T1 chose to ban Blitzcrank and Xin Zhao. Beginning the second picking phase, BLG selected Sejuani for Xun, with T1 rounding out their last two picks with Rumble for Zeus and Poppy for Oner. Rakan was BLG's final selection for ON.

Game 4 ended with a game time of 31:42 minutes, with a final kill scoreline of 14–9 in favor of T1, forcing a deciding fifth and final game.

Game 4	31:42	T1	14	–	10	Bilibili Gaming	London, United Kingdom
		Series tied 2–2					The O2 Arena
		K/D/A: 14/10/36; Gold: 60.4K; Turrets: 9 Drakes: 4 Elder Dragons: 0 Barons: 2 Voidgrubs: 6	Game Stats			K/D/A: 10/14/20; Gold: 52.5K; Turrets: 2 Drakes: 0 Elder Dragons: 0 Barons: 0 Voidgrubs: 0	

=== Game 5 ===
Game 5 Team Compositions
Role	BLG	T1
Top	Jax	Gragas
Jungle	Jarvan	Xin Zhao
Middle	Ahri	Galio
ADC	Kai'sa	Xayah
Support	Rell	Poppy

Heading into Game 5, the team on blue side had won three consecutive games with the last time a team on red side won was during the first game. BLG were on blue side whilst T1 was in red. The first banning phase saw BLG and T1 opting to ban Varus and Aurora, marking them the only two champions to be banned five times in the series. BLG's other bans were Ashe and Skarner, whilst for T1, it was Yone and Kalista. In the first picking phase, BLG selected Jax for Bin, marking the first time in the series that he would play the champion. In response, T1 selected Gragas for Zeus, a champion whom he has an undefeated record before the Finals; and Galio for Faker. For their next two picks, BLG selected Kai'Sa for Elk and Ahri for Knight, denying Faker his best champion of his career despite Knight having a 1–2 record with the champion in the tournament heading into the finals. Concluding the first picking phase was T1 picking Xayah for Gumayusi. For their final two bans, T1 banned Wukong and Kindred, while BLG banned Rakan and Renata Glasc. In the final picking phase of the series, T1 locked in Poppy for Keria. In their final two picks, BLG selected Jarvan for Xun, a champion that was only used once during the World Championship up to that point; and Rell for ON. The final selection of the series was Xin Zhao for Oner.

Game 5 had the longest game time of the series at 32:13 minutes, with a final kill scoreline of 12–6 in favor of T1, winning their fifth World Championship.

Game 5	32:13	Bilibili Gaming	6	–	12	T1	London, United Kingdom
		T1 wins series 3–2					The O2 Arena
		K/D/A: 6/12/17; Gold: 55.3K; Turrets: 3 Drakes: 1 Elder Dragons: 0 Barons: 0 Voidgrubs: 1	Game Stats			K/D/A: 12/6/24; Gold: 62.5K; Turrets: 7 Drakes: 3 Elder Dragons: 0 Barons: 1 Voidgrubs: 5	

== Post-series ==
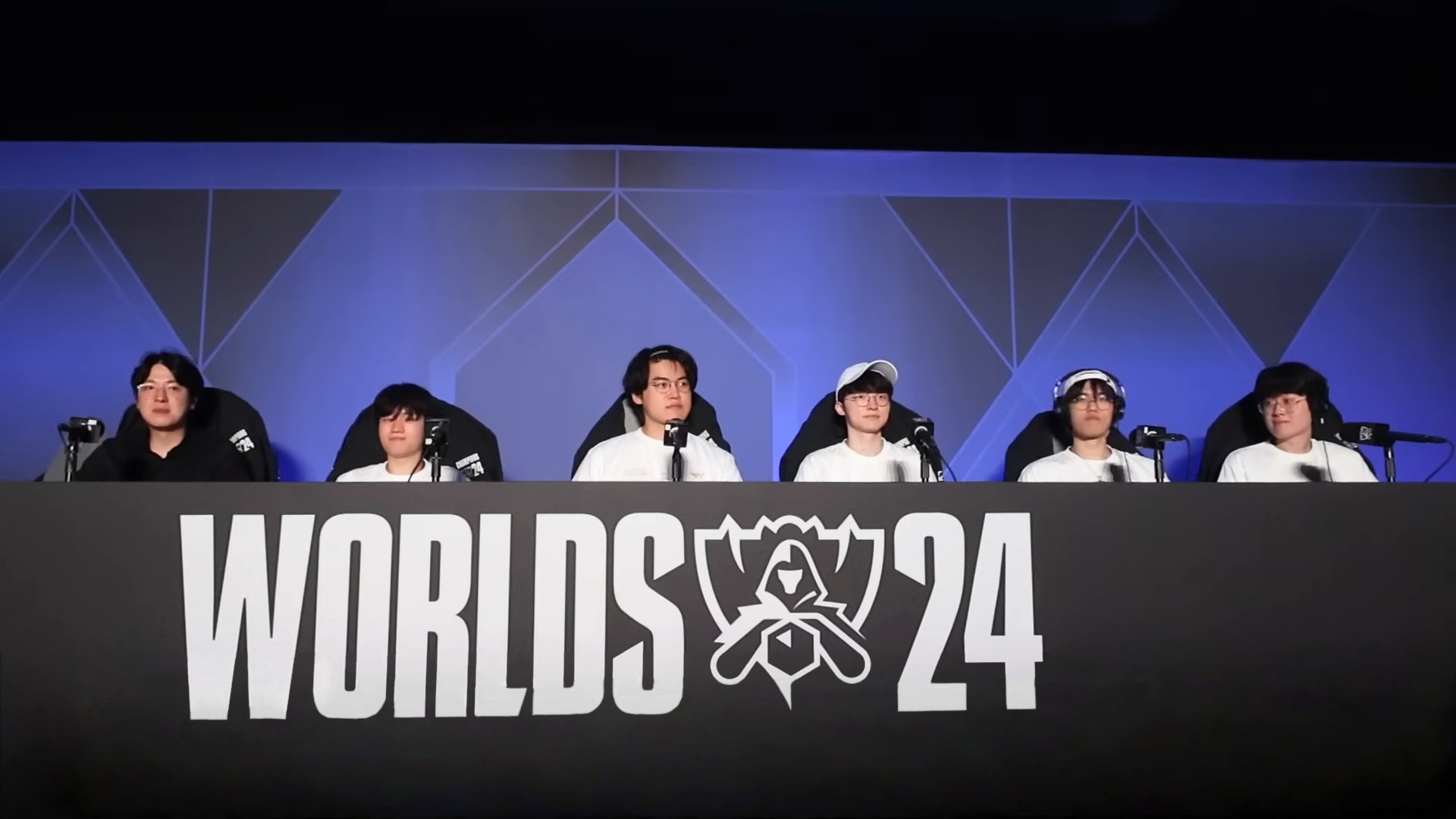
T1 during the postgame press conference

T1's victory marked the first back-to-back world championship feat by a team since the 2016 edition, coincidentally also by the same organization who were then known as SK Telecom T1. The tournament had a base prize pool of US$2.25 million. Of this, the winners, T1, received 20% ($450,000) of the pool. For coming second, BLG was rewarded 16% ($360,000). As with previous world champions, T1 is expected to work directly with Riot's visual department to release skins for their chosen champions, with one skin per player except for Faker's, who will receive two after being voted the Finals MVP.

The final was the last to be held under the two-split structure of the League of Legends professional esports scene, with a new three-split format to be applied to all regions and competitive calendar which took effect at the start of the 2025 competitive season, retaining both the Mid-Season Invitational and the World Championship and creating a new international event, "First Stand", which became the first international event to implement the "Fearless Draft" format.

Four players from T1's roster had their contracts expiring on 18 November 2024, with three of them renewing their stints with the squad for the 2025 competitive season. Oner and Keria re-signed on two-year contracts until 2026, while Gumayusi extended his contract for one more competitive season. With Faker having extended his contract until 2025 at the end of the 2022 season, Zeus would be the only player on the roster to switch teams, as he signed with Hanwha Life Esports for the 2025 campaign. T1 then announced the signing of Choi "Doran" Hyeon-joon as his replacement on 19 November 2024, transferring from the same team Zeus joined, and marking the 2024 Worlds Final the last international series and the regional qualifier against KT Rolster the last domestic series for the "ZOFGK" (Zeus-Oner-Faker-Gumayusi-Keria) era of T1, after debuting the roster during the 2022 season.

BLG's contracts for Bin, Xun, Knight, Elk, and ON all have expired on 20 November 2024. Four of the five players that featured in the Finals re-signed with the team, with Bin and Elk signing on two-year contracts until 2026 and Knight and ON signing solely for the 2025 season. Xun was the only player to leave the organization, signing with JD Gaming. The team's substitute jungler Yan "Wei" Yangwei, who appeared in three Swiss stage matches for BLG during the 2024 World Championship, became Xun's replacement for the 2025 competitive season, signing on a two-year deal. Wei, however, would part ways with the team days before the 2025 Mid-Season Invitational, with Yang “Beichuan” Ling replacing him as the starting jungler.
