= Kanavi (gamer) =

South Korean esports player (born 2000)

- Kanavi in 2026

Personal information
- Name: 서진혁 (Seo Jin-hyeok)
- Born: November 2, 2000 (age 26); Daegu, South Korea

Current team
- Team: Dplus KIA
- Role: Jungler
- Game: League of Legends
- League: LCK

Career information
- Playing career: 2019–present

Team history
- 2019: Griffin
- 2019: JD Gaming (Loan)
- 2020–2024: JD Gaming
- 2025: Top Esports
- 2026: Hanwha Life Esports
- 2027: Dplus KIA

Career highlights and awards
- 2× MSI champion (2023, 2026); 5× LPL champion; LPL MVP of the Split; 2× LPL Jungler of the Year; LPL Import Player of the Year; 4× LPL First All-Pro Team
Medal record
Esports
Representing South Korea
Asian Games
Gold medal – first place	2022 Hangzhou	League of Legends

Seo Jin-hyeok (Korean: 서진혁; born November 2, 2000), better known as Kanavi, is a South Korean professional League of Legends player for Dplus KIA of the League of Legends Champions Korea (LCK). Throughout his career, he has won four League of Legends Pro League (LPL) titles and two Mid-Season Invitational (MSI) titles. He also represented the South Korean national team at the 2022 Asian Games, earning a gold medal.

Kanavi's career began in 2019 when he joined LCK team Griffin as a substitute. He joined LPL team JD Gaming on a loan from Griffin later that year. However, after an investigation by Riot Games and KeSPA that revealed Griffin was in violation of tampering rules, contract length regulations, and undue pressure on Kanavi, he was released from his contract at the end of the year. Kanavi chose to sign with JD Gaming in 2020 and won his first LPL title that year. He went on to win three consecutive LPL championships with the team from Summer 2022 to Summer 2023 and won the 2023 Mid-Season Invitational.

Kanavi's individual accomplishments include accolades such as a World Championship Most Valuable Player (MVP) award, an LPL split MVP award, two LPL Jungler of the Year awards, an LPL Import Player of the Year award, and four LPL First All-Pro Team designations. He also became the fifth jungler in the LPL to reach 1,000 kills.

== Professional career ==
=== 2019: Griffin and JD Gaming loan ===
Kanavi signed a three-year contract with League of Legends Champions Korea (LCK) team Griffin on February 16, 2019. He did not play in any matches in the 2019 LCK Spring Split.

Kanavi joined League of Legends Pro League (LPL) team JD Gaming on loan from Griffin on May 22, 2019. Griffin and their director Cho Gyu-nam received ₩600 million (US$503,975) for the transaction, and according to former Griffin head coach Kim "cvMax" Dae-ho, Kanavi's annual salary, originally set at ₩200 million ($167,989), was lowered for the first four months of the loan period. He and the team finished in 10th place in the 2019 LPL Summer Split and third in the LPL 2019 regional qualifiers.

==== Contract investigation ====
After spending several months on loan with JD Gaming, Kanavi was approached by the team's management, expressing a desire for the jungler to commit to a five-year contract, fully transferring from Griffin to JD Gaming. In an interview with Kukmin Ilbo, cvMax stated that due to this direct approach by JD Gaming, Cho accused Kanavi of tampering and issued a threat to terminate his playing career unless he adhered to Cho's demands. Consequently, Kanavi proceeded to sign a five-year agreement with JD Gaming. This deal stipulated that Griffin and Cho would receive ₩1 billion ($839,941), while Kanavi accepted the league-minimum salary.

On October 29, 2019, a committee formed Riot Games and KeSPA released a report indicating that Kanavi and JD Gaming were not found in violation of tampering rules. However, the committee ruled that Griffin did breach regulations, specifically related to the maximum number of players loaned to other teams. Additionally, Griffin was found to have violated Riot regulations by exceeding the maximum contract length of three years in Kanavi's contract. A month later, Riot and KeSPA reported that Cho exerted undue pressure on Kanavi to enter into a contractual agreement while he was still a minor. Furthermore, they alleged that Cho included a clause in Kanavi's contract when he was loaned to JD Gaming, ensuring that the time spent away with JD Gaming would not impact the overall term of his contract with Griffin. On November 21, 2019, Kukmin Ilbo released a copy of the contract between Kanavi and Griffin, revealing several clauses that diverged from industry norms. Notably, one provision allowed the team to terminate the contract if the player was hospitalized or faced a severe health issue and barred the player from contracting with another team for a year. Another clause imposed a fine of ₩5 million ($42,900) and mandated the return of all paid salary if the player lost contact with the team for an extended period. Shortly after, Griffin released Kanavi from his contract.

The Kanavi and Griffin case had a significant impact on esports regulation in South Korea. After consultations with esports stakeholders, the Korean government introduced several standardized contracts: the Esports Player Standard Contract, the Esports Trainee Standard Contract, and the Teenage Esports Player Standard Affiliated Agreement.

=== 2020–2024: JD Gaming ===
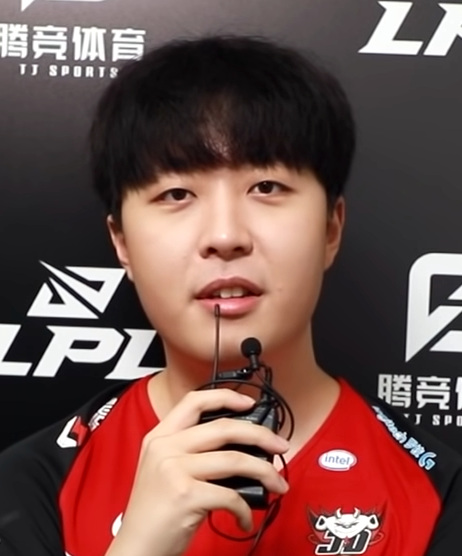
Kanavi in a 2020 interview

On November 28, 2019, Kanavi signed a one-year deal with JD Gaming. Kanavi expressed relief following the signing, stating in an interview, "When I first heard about the contract that would transfer me to China's JDG for four years, five years, I felt stuck. I wondered if I could try hard for four, five years. Now, I've become a free agent, then made a new contract with JDG. It's a single-year contract and the package I'm satisfied with. I'm relieved."

JD Gaming finished the 2020 LPL Spring Split regular season in second place with 12–4 game record, and Kanavi was named the LPL MVP of the Split. He had a total of 151 kills and 68 deaths throughout the season and led all junglers in terms of damage dealt. He played a total of 11 different champions over the split and participated in 76% of his teams' kills. He was also named to the 2020 LPL Spring Split First All-Pro Team. Kanavi won his first LPL title in May 2020, after JD Gaming defeated Top Esports in the 2020 LPL Spring Finals. In the 2020 LPL Summer Split, Kanavi was again selected to the LPL First All-Pro Team. He reached the LPL Finals, for the second consecutive split, in August 2020, but JD Gaming was defeated by Top Esports and finished in second place. On September 20, 2020, Kanavi extended his contract with JD Gaming.

Kanavi was named to the 2022 LPL Spring First All-Pro Team. On July 18, 2022, in a match against Invictus Gaming during the 2022 LPL Summer Split regular season, Kanavi achieved his 1,000th kill in the LPL, becoming the fifth jungler in LPL history to do so. Throughout the split, Kanavi led all junglers in kills and had the third-most among all players. He won his second LPL title in September 2022, defeating Top Esports in the 2022 LPL Summer Split Finals. Kanavi renewed his contract with JD Gaming on November 23, 2022. At the 2022 LPL Annual Awards Ceremony, Kavavi was named the Import Player of the Year and the Jungler of the Year.

In the 2023 LPL Spring Split, Kanavi registered the highest damager per minute and KDA among all LPL junglers, as well as the second highest damage share percentage. In the playoffs, JDG reached the 2023 LPL Spring Split Final, where they faced Bilibili Gaming. JDG won the match, 3 games to 0, giving Kanavi his third LPL title. In the 2023 Mid-Season Invitational, JDG went on to win the 2023 MSI Final against BiliBili, giving Kanavi his first MSI title. At the end of the 2023 LPL Summer Split regular season, Kanavi earned a spot on the 2023 Summer LPL First All-Pro Team. In the playoffs, JDG secured a 3–2 victory over LNG Esports in the 2023 LPL Summer Finals, achieving back-to-back LPL titles, and giving Kanavi his fourth. With this win, JDG qualified as the top seed LPL representative in the 2023 World Championship. Having won both LPL titles, the MSI, and the 2023 Asian Games, Kanavi and teammate Park "Ruler" Jae-hyuk had the opportunity to become the first players in history to win every event they had attended in a calendar year, should they win the 2023 World Championship. However, JDG were eliminated in the Worlds semifinals by T1, losing by a score of 1–3. Kanavi received his second Jungler of the Year award at the 2023 LPL Annual Awards Ceremony in December 2023.

On December 4, 2023, JD Gaming announced that Kanavi had re-signed with the team for the 2024 season.

== National team career ==
Kanavi represented South Korea in the 2022 Asian Games one of the six members in the League of Legends division of the South Korea national esports team. Kanavi clinched a gold medal as South Korea emerged victorious against Saudi Arabia, China, and Chinese Taipei in the quarterfinals, semifinals, and finals, respectively. With the gold medal, Kanavi received an exemption from mandatory military service.

== Seasons overview ==
Year	Team	Domestic				Mid-Season Invitational	World Championship
Year	Team	League	Spring		Summer	Mid-Season Invitational	World Championship
2019	Griffin	LCK	2nd		—N/a	Did not qualify	—N/a
2019	JD Gaming (L)	LPL	—N/a		10th	—N/a	Did not qualify
2020	JD Gaming	LPL	1st		2nd	None held (Note: Cancelled due to the COVID-19 pandemic.)	5th–8th
2021	JD Gaming	LPL	5th–6th		12th	Did not qualify	Did not qualify
2022	JD Gaming	LPL	4th		1st	Did not qualify	3rd–4th
2023	JD Gaming	LPL	1st		1st	1st	3rd–4th
2024	JD Gaming	LPL	3rd		7th–8th	Did not qualify	Did not qualify
			Split 1	Split 2	Split 3		
2025	Top Esports	LPL	1st	5th–6th	2nd	Did not qualify	3rd–4th

== Awards and honors ==
International

- Two-time Mid-Season Invitational champion – 2023, 2026

LCK

- One-time LCK First All-Pro Team - 2026 Season

LPL

- Four-time LPL champion – Spring 2020, Summer 2022, Spring 2023, Summer 2023
- One-time LPL MVP of the Split – Spring 2020
- Two-time LPL Jungler of the Year – 2022, 2023
- One-time LPL Import Player of the Year – 2022
- Four-time LPL First All-Pro Team – Spring 2020, Summer 2020, Spring 2022, Summer 2023
- Two-time LPL Second All-Pro Team – Summer 2022, Spring 2023

South Korea Esports

- Asian Games gold medal winner – 2022

== Personal life ==
Kanavi was born on November 12, 2000, in Daegu, South Korea.
