= 2023 LPL season =

- League: LPL
- Sport: League of Legends
- Duration: January 14 – April 15 (Spring); May 29 – August 5 (Summer)
- Teams: 17

Spring Split
- Champions: JD Gaming
- Runners-up: Bilibili Gaming
- Season MVP: Lee "Scout" Ye-chan

Summer Split
- Champions: JD Gaming
- Runners-up: LNG Esports
- Season MVP: Lee "Scout" Ye-chan

LPL seasons
- ← 2022 2024 →

The 2023 LPL season was the 11th season of the League of Legends Pro League (LPL), a Chinese professional esports league for the video game League of Legends. The season was divided into two splits: Spring and Summer. The Spring Split began on January 14, 2023, and culminated with the Spring Split Finals on April 15, 2023. The Summer Split began on May 29, 2023, and culminated with the LCS Championship Final on August 5, 2023.

JD Gaming won the Spring Split playoffs, directly qualifying them for the 2023 Mid-Season Invitational (MSI), while Bilibili Gaming finished as the runners-up, qualifying them for the MSI play-in stage. JD Gaming also won the Summer Split playoffs, earning a direct qualification to the 2023 World Championship. Bilibili Gaming qualified for the 2023 World Championship via Championship Points, and both LNG Esports and Weibo Gaming also qualified for the 2023 World Championship through the Regional Finals.

== Spring ==
The Spring Split regular season ran from January 14 to March 25, 2023. The 17 teams competed in a single round-robin tournament, where all matches were best-of-three. The top 10 teams from the regular season secured spots in the playoffs. The top two teams automatically progressed to a four-team double-elimination tournament. Meanwhile, the next six teams competed in a single-elimination king-of-the-hill tournament, with the top two teams advancing to join the initial top two in the four-team double-elimination tournament. The top two teams from the Spring Split playoffs qualified for the 2023 Mid-Season Invitational.

=== Regular season ===
Pos	Team	Pld	W	L	PCT	Qualification
1	JD Gaming	16	13	3	.813	Advance to Upper Semifinals
2	Edward Gaming	16	13	3	.813	Advance to Upper Semifinals
3	LNG Esports	16	13	3	.813	Advance to Round 3
4	Weibo Gaming	16	11	5	.688	Advance to Round 3
5	Bilibili Gaming	16	10	6	.625	Advance to Round 2
6	Oh My God	16	10	6	.625	Advance to Round 2
7	Top Esports	16	9	7	.563	Advance to Round 1
8	ThunderTalk Gaming	16	9	7	.563	Advance to Round 1
9	Royal Never Give Up	16	8	8	.500	Advance to Round 1
10	Team WE	16	8	8	.500	Advance to Round 1
11	Invictus Gaming	16	7	9	.438	
12	Rare Atom	16	5	11	.313	
13	Ninjas in Pyjamas	16	5	11	.313	
14	LGD Gaming	16	5	11	.313	
15	FunPlus Phoenix	16	4	12	.250	
16	Anyone's Legend	16	3	13	.188	
17	Ultra Prime Esports	16	3	13	.188	

Source: LoL Esports

=== Playoffs ===
==== Bracket ====
Round 1
8	ThunderTalk Gaming	1
9	Royal Never Give Up	3
7	Top Esports	3
10	Team WE	1

Round 2
5	Bilibili Gaming	3
9	Royal Never Give Up	1
6	Oh My God	3
7	Top Esports	2

Round 3
4	Weibo Gaming	0
5	Bilibili Gaming	3
3	LNG Esports	1
6	Oh My God	3

Upper semifinals
1	JD Gaming	3
5	Bilibili Gaming	2
2	Edward Gaming	3
6	Oh My God	1
Lower semifinal
5	Bilibili Gaming	3
6	Oh My God	2

Upper final
1	JD Gaming	3
2	Edward Gaming	0
Lower final
2	Edward Gaming	2
5	Bilibili Gaming	3

Final
1	JD Gaming	3
5	Bilibili Gaming	1

Source: LoL Esports

== Summer ==
=== Regular season ===
Pos	Team	Pld	W	L	PCT	Qualification
1	Bilibili Gaming	16	15	1	.938	Advance to Upper Semifinals
2	JD Gaming	16	14	2	.875	Advance to Upper Semifinals
3	LNG Esports	16	12	4	.750	Advance to Round 3
4	Top Esports	16	12	4	.750	Advance to Round 3
5	Oh My God	16	11	5	.688	Advance to Round 2
6	Weibo Gaming	16	10	6	.625	Advance to Round 2
7	Royal Never Give Up	16	8	8	.500	Advance to Round 1
8	Edward Gaming	16	8	8	.500	Advance to Round 1
9	Team WE	16	7	9	.438	Advance to Round 1
10	Ninjas in Pyjamas	16	7	9	.438	Advance to Round 1
11	FunPlus Phoenix	16	6	10	.375	
12	Invictus Gaming	16	6	10	.375	
13	ThunderTalk Gaming	16	5	11	.313	
14	Ultra Prime Esports	16	5	11	.313	
15	Rare Atom	16	4	12	.250	
16	Anyone's Legend	16	4	12	.250	
17	LGD Gaming	16	2	14	.125	

Source: LoL Esports

=== Playoffs ===
==== Bracket ====
Round 1
8	Edward Gaming	3
9	Team WE	1
7	Royal Never Give Up	1
10	Ninjas in Pyjamas	3

Round 2
5	Oh My God	2
8	Edward Gaming	3
6	Weibo Gaming	3
10	Ninjas in Pyjamas	1

Round 3
4	Top Esports	3
8	Edward Gaming	2
3	LNG Esports	3
6	Weibo Gaming	2

Upper semifinals
1	Bilibili Gaming	3
4	Top Esports	1
2	JD Gaming	3
3	LNG Esports	2
Lower semifinal
4	Top Esports	1
3	LNG Esports	3

Upper final
1	Bilibili Gaming	0
2	JD Gaming	3
Lower final
1	Bilibili Gaming	1
3	LNG Esports	3

Final
2	JD Gaming	3
3	LNG Esports	2

Source: LoL Esports

== Championship Points ==
Pos	Team	Spr	Sum	Total	Qualification
1	JD Gaming	90	AQ	AQ	2023 World Championship
2	Bilibili Gaming	70	80	150	2023 World Championship
3	LNG Esports	20	110	130	Advance to Regional Finals Upper Final
4	Edward Gaming	50	40	90	Advance to Regional Finals Upper Final
5	Top Esports	10	60	70	Advance to Regional Finals Lower Semifinal
6	Weibo Gaming	20	40	60	Advance to Regional Finals Lower Semifinal
7	Oh My God	30	10	40	
8	Ninjas in Pyjamas	0	10	10	
9	Royal Never Give Up	10	0	10	
10	Team WE	0	0	0	
11	FunPlus Phoenix	0	0	0	
12	Invictus Gaming	0	0	0	
13	ThunderTalk Gaming	0	0	0	
14	Ultra Prime Esports	0	0	0	
15	Rare Atom	0	0	0	
16	Anyone's Legend	0	0	0	
17	LGD Gaming	0	0	0	

Source: 2023 LPL Rulebook

== Regional Finals ==
The Regional Finals was a tournament consisting of the top four teams in the LPL based on championship points that had not directly qualified for the 2023 World Championship. The top two teams faced off, and the winner earned a spot in the World Championship. Simultaneously, the bottom two teams played against each other, with the losing team being eliminated. The remaining two teams then competed for the last LPL spot in the 2023 World Championship.

Upper final	Advance to World Championship
3	LNG Esports	3
LNG Esports
4	Edward Gaming	1
Lower semifinal	Lower final	Advance to World Championship
4	Edward Gaming	1
Weibo Gaming
5	Top Esports	2	6	Weibo Gaming	3
6	Weibo Gaming	3

Source: LoL Esports

== Awards ==
Spring

- Most Valuable Player: Scout, LNG Esports
- Most Outstanding Rookie: Leave, Edward Gaming
- 1st Team All-Pro:
  - T 369, JD Gaming
  - J Jiejie, Edward Gaming
  - M Scout, LNG Esports
  - B Ruler, JD Gaming
  - S Meiko, Edward Gaming
- 2nd Team All-Pro:
  - T Ale, Edward Gaming
  - J Kanavi, JD Gaming
  - M Knight, JD Gaming
  - B Elk, Bilibili Gaming
  - S Missing, JD Gaming
- 3rd Team All-Pro:
  - T Shanji, Oh My God
  - J Tarzan, LNG Esports
  - M FoFo, Edward Gaming
  - B Leave, Edward Gaming
  - S Hang, LNG Esports

Summer

- Most Valuable Player: Scout, LNG Esports
- Most Outstanding Rookie: Tangyuan, Royal Never Give Up
- 1st Team All-Pro:
  - T Bin, Bilibili Gaming
  - J Kanavi, JD Gaming
  - M Knight, JD Gaming
  - B Ruler, JD Gaming
  - S ON, Bilibili Gaming
- 2nd Team All-Pro:
  - T 369, JD Gaming
  - J Xun, Bilibili Gaming
  - M Scout, LNG Esports
  - B Elk, Bilibili Gaming
  - S Missing, JD Gaming
- 3rd Team All-Pro:
  - T Shanji, Oh My God
  - J Tian, Top Esports
  - M Yagao, Bilibili Gaming
  - B JackeyLove, Top Esports
  - S Crisp, Weibo Gaming

Season

- Most Valuable Player: Knight, JD Gaming
- Rookie of the Year: Heng, Team WE
- Best Coaching Staff: JD Gaming
- Best Import Player: Ruler, JD Gaming
- Manager of the Year Hou Lin, JD Gaming
