= 2024 Mid-Season Invitational =

League of Legends esports tournament

Tournament information
- Sport: League of Legends
- Location: Chengdu, China
- Dates: May 1–19, 2024
- Administrator: Riot Games
- Venue: Chengdu Financial City Performing Arts Center
- Teams: 12

Final positions
- Champions: Gen.G
- Runner-up: Bilibili Gaming
- MVP: Son "Lehends" Si-woo (Gen.G)

The 2024 Mid-Season Invitational was the ninth Mid-Season Invitational (MSI), a Riot Games-organised tournament for League of Legends, a multiplayer online battle arena video game. The tournament was hosted in Chengdu, China, from May 1 to 19, 2024. All stages of the tournament were played at the Chengdu Financial City Performing Arts Center.

JD Gaming from China were the reigning champions, but failed to qualify for the event after losing to Top Esports in the lower bracket final of the 2024 LPL Spring Playoffs.

The event was won by Gen.G of South Korea after defeating the previous years' finalist, Bilibili Gaming of China, in the final with a score of 3–1. Gen.G became the second Korean team (after T1) to win an MSI title, and their win marked the first time a non-LPL (Chinese) team has won the event after three consecutive years of prior Chinese winners. (Note: There was no MSI event held in 2020 due to the COVID-19 pandemic.)

== Format ==
Eight of the twelve teams started in the play-in stage, with the second seeds from the League of Legends Pro League (LPL), League of Legends Champions Korea (LCK), League of Legends EMEA Championship (LEC), and League Championship Series (LCS) facing the top seeds from Liga Latinoamérica (LLA), Campeonato Brasileiro de League of Legends (CBLOL), Vietnam Championship Series (VCS), and Pacific Championship Series (PCS). The play-in stage is split into two double-elimination brackets, where each match is in a best-of-three format. The top four teams from the play-in stage advance to the bracket stage, where they will face off against the top seeds from the LCS, LEC, LCK, and LPL. This stage will consist of four matches, each being a best-of-five series, forming a double-elimination bracket.

For the first time, the winner of the MSI will automatically qualify for the 2024 World Championship, provided that they qualify for the playoffs during the 2024 Summer Split in their respective domestic league.

== Qualified teams ==
A total of twelve teams have qualified for the event. The LPL, LCK, LEC and LCS have two teams each represented in event, with one team from each league qualifying directly to the bracket stage. The remaining four teams have qualified for the play-in stage, along with one team each from the PCS, VCS, LLA, and CBLOL.

Region	League	Path	Team	Pool
Starting in the bracket stage
China	LPL	Spring champion	Bilibili Gaming	1
South Korea	LCK	Spring champion	Gen.G	1
EMEA	LEC	Spring champion	G2 Esports	2
North America	LCS	Spring champion	Team Liquid	2
Starting in the play-in stage
China	LPL	Spring runner-up	Top Esports	1
South Korea	LCK	Spring runner-up	T1	1
EMEA	LEC	Championship points (Note: Due to G2 Esports winning both the LEC Winter and Spring splits, Fnatic qualified by having the second-highest number of championship points after the LEC Spring split.)	Fnatic	2
North America	LCS	Spring runner-up	FlyQuest	2
Asia-Pacific	PCS	Spring champion	PSG Talon	3
Vietnam	VCS	Spring champion	GAM Esports	3
Brazil	CBLOL	Split 1 champion	LOUD	4
Latin America	LLA	Opening Split champion	Estral Esports	4

== Venue ==
Chengdu was the city chosen to host the competition, marking the second time that China will host the tournament, having held the event in 2016. All stages of the tournament will be held at the Chengdu Financial City Performing Arts Center.

Chengdu, China
Chengdu Financial City Performing Arts Center
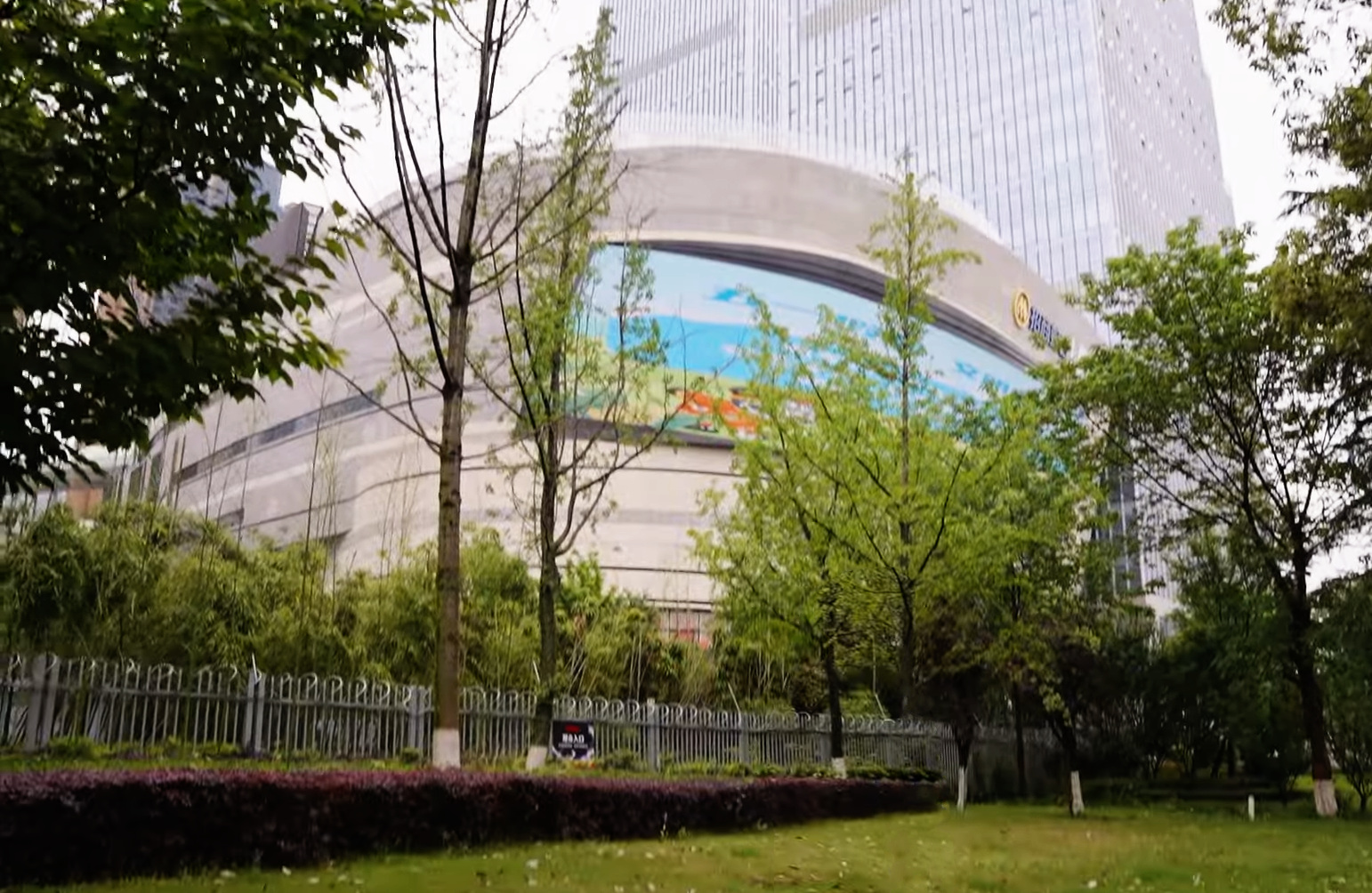

== Play-in stage ==
- Date and time: 1–5 May, began at 16:00 CST (08:00 UTC)
- Eight teams would be drawn into two groups.
- Pool 1 team would play with pool 4 team, while pool 2 team would play with pool 3 team in upper bracket round 1.
- Double elimination; all matches are best-of-three.
- The four teams consisting of the winners and runners-up of each group advance to the Bracket Stage as pool 3 and pool 4. Remaining four teams are eliminated.

=== Brackets ===
Group A

Upper round 1
Match 1 – 1 May
PSG Talon	1
FlyQuest	2
Match 2 – 1 May
Estral Esports	0
T1	2
Lower round 1
Match 4 – 4 May
PSG Talon	2
Estral Esports	0

Upper final
Match 3 – 3 May
FlyQuest	0
T1	2
Lower final
Match 5 – 5 May
FlyQuest	0
PSG Talon	2

Advance to bracket stage
T1
PSG Talon

Source: LoL Esports

Group B

Upper round 1
Match 1 – 2 May
Fnatic	2
GAM Esports	0
Match 2 – 2 May
Top Esports	2
LOUD	0
Lower round 1
Match 4 – 4 May
GAM Esports	2
LOUD	1

Upper final
Match 3 – 3 May
Fnatic	1
Top Esports	2
Lower final
Match 5 – 5 May
Fnatic	2
GAM Esports	0

Advance to bracket stage
Top Esports
Fnatic

Source: LoL Esports

== Bracket stage ==
- Date and time: 7–19 May, began at 17:00 CST (09:00 UTC).
  - Exlcuding games played on 11–12 May, which began at 12:00 CST (04:00 UTC).
- Teams from the same pool will be drawn into different sides of the bracket, with pool 1 teams facing pool 4 teams, and pool 2 teams playing against pool 3 teams in upper quarterfinals.
- Teams of the same region could not face each other in upper quarterfinals.
- Double elimination; matches are best-of-five.
- Notation: "W1" and "L1" indicate the winner and loser from Match 1, respectively. "W2" and "L2" indicate the winner and loser from Match 2, respectively, and so on.

Upper quarterfinals	Upper semifinals	Upper final	Final
Match 1 – 7 May
Team Liquid	0
Match 6 - 11 May
Top Esports	3
W1	Top Esports	2
Match 2 – 8 May
W2	Gen.G	3
Gen.G	3
Match 11 - 16 May
Fnatic	0
W6	Gen.G	3
Match 3 – 9 May
W8	Bilibili Gaming	1
Bilibili Gaming	3
Match 8 - 12 May
PSG Talon	2
W3	Bilibili Gaming	3
Match 4 – 10 May
W4	T1	1
G2 Esports	2	Match 14 - 19 May
T1	3	W11	Gen.G	3
W13	Bilibili Gaming	1
Lower round 1	Lower quarterfinals	Lower semifinal	Lower final
Match 9 - 15 May
Match 5 - 11 May	L8	T1	3	Match 13 - 18 May
L1	Team Liquid	3	W5	Team Liquid	1	Match 12 - 17 May	L11	Bilibili Gaming	3
L2	Fnatic	1	W9	T1	3	W12	T1	2
Match 10 - 14 May	W10	G2 Esports	0
Match 7 - 12 May	L6	Top Esports	0
L3	PSG Talon	0	W7	G2 Esports	3
L4	G2 Esports	3

Source: LoL Esports

== Ranking ==
=== Team ranking ===
Place	League	Team	Prize (%)	Prize (USD)
1st	LCK	Gen.G	20%	$50,000
2nd	LPL	Bilibili Esports	16%	$40,000
3rd	LCK	T1	12%	$30,000
4th	LEC	G2 Esports	10%	$25,000
5th–6th	LCS	Team Liquid	8%	$20,000
5th–6th	LPL	Top Esports	8%	$20,000
7th–8th	PCS	PSG Talon	6%	$15,000
7th–8th	LEC	Fnatic	6%	$15,000
9th–10th	VCS	GAM Esports	4%	$10,000
9th–10th	LCS	FlyQuest	4%	$10,000
11th–12th	CBLOL	LOUD	3%	$7,500
11th–12th	LLA	Estral Esports	3%	$7,500
