= Victory Five =

Esports organisation in China (2018–2023)

- Short name: V5
- Games: League of Legends; PlayerUnknown's Battlegrounds
- Founded: 2018
- Folded: 6 January 2023
- League: League of Legends Pro League
- Based in: Macau (2018–2020); Shenzhen (2021–2023)
- Location: China
- Stadium: Shenzhen Media Group Longgang Production Center
- Owner: Mario Ho

Victory Five was a Chinese professional esports organisation based in Shenzhen. It was owned by Mario Ho, head of Macau's esports association and son of the late Stanley Ho. It had teams competing in League of Legends and PlayerUnknown's Battlegrounds.

Plans to merge Victory Five and Ninjas in Pyjamas (NiP) were announced on 9 July 2020 by the teams' respective owners. The merger was completed on 10 August 2021, and, on 6 January 2023, Victory Five was dissolved and its teams were rebranded as NiP China.

== League of Legends ==
=== History ===
Victory Five entered the professional League of Legends scene on 30 November 2018, when their application to the League of Legends Pro League (LPL), China's top-level league for the game, was accepted. Along with SinoDragon Gaming, Victory Five joined the league as part of its expansion from 14 to 16 teams. Victory Five's inaugural roster consisted of top laner Lim "Jinoo" Jin-woo, junglers Tu "Ben4" Xincheng and Hu "Pepper" Zhiwei, mid laner Lei "Corn" Wen, bot laner Wang "y4" Nongmo, and supports Le "Ley" Yi and Yun "Road" Han-gil, with Tsai "DOG8" Hsueh-yu as head coach. The team finished 13th in the 2019 LPL Spring Split with a 4–11 record.

Victory Five replaced almost their entire roster for the 2019 LPL Summer Split, except for Ben4 and y4. Jinoo was traded to Edward Gaming in exchange for mid laner Li "Mole" Haoyan on 23 May 2019. Two days later on 25 May 2019, it was announced that top laner Huang "Aliez" Hao, mid laner Tao "Windy" Xiang, and support Li "Max" Xiaoqiang would be promoted from Victory Five's academy roster, V5 87. Despite the late addition of Hou "Otto" Guoyu, Victory Five finished 12th in the regular season with a 5–10 record.

In the 2020 LPL Spring Split the team set a league record for most consecutive losses, failing to win a single series and winning only one game against the second-last team, LNG Esports. The team's performance was hindered throughout the season by the COVID-19 pandemic in China, as several of their players lived within quarantine zones and were forbidden from leaving.

Victory Five revamped their roster prior to the 2020 LPL Summer Split; top laner Yu "Biubiu" Leixin, jungler Wei "Weiwei" Bohan, and bot laner Lee "Samd" Jae-hoon were acquired from Suning, while prospective rookie Guo "ppgod" Peng joined from FunPlus Blaze as the team's new support.

=== Tournament results ===
Placement	Event	Final result (W–L)
13th	2019 LPL Spring Split	4–11
12th	2019 LPL Summer Split	5–10
17th	2020 LPL Spring Split	0–16
5th	2020 LPL Summer Split	11–5
5th	2020 LPL Summer Playoffs	1–3 (against Suning)
5th–8th	2020 Demacia Cup	1–3 (against JD Gaming)
12th	2021 LPL Spring Split	6–10
17th	2021 LPL Summer Split	0–16

== Organisation ==
The Swedish esports organisation Ninjas in Pyjamas (NIP) announced on 9 July 2020 that it planned to merge with ESV5, a joint venture between eStar Gaming and Victory Five, to establish a new entity which would be listed on the Nasdaq Stock Market. The merger was actualised on 10 August 2021, with plans for Victory Five to rebrand under the NIP name by the end of 2022.

Hong Kong rapper Jackson Wang joined Victory Five as an investor in September 2020. Victory Five also partnered with Team Holding, owned by Wang.
