= Esports at the 2022 Asian Games – League of Legends =

League of Legends at the 2022 Asian Games
- Venue: Hangzhou Esports Center
- Date: 25–29 September 2023
- Competitors: 86 from 15 nations

Medalists
gold medal	South Korea; Choi Woo-je, Seo Jin-hyeok, Jung Ji-hun, Park Jae-hyeok, Ryu Min-seok, Lee Sang-hyeok
silver medal	Chinese Taipei; Xu Shi-Jie, Hung Hao-hsuan, Chu Jun-lan, Chiu Tzu-chuan, Hu Shuo-chieh, Su Chia-hsiang
bronze medal	China; Chen Zebin, Zhao Lijie, Zhuo Ding, Zhao Jiahao, Tian Ye, Peng Lixun

The League of Legends event at the 2022 Asian Games took place from 25 to 29 September 2023 in Hangzhou, China.

== Schedule ==
All times are China Standard Time (UTC+08:00)

Date	Time	Event
Monday, 25 September 2023	09:00	Group round
Tuesday, 26 September 2023	09:00	Group round
Wednesday, 27 September 2023	09:00	Quarterfinals
Thursday, 28 September 2023	09:00	Semifinals
Friday, 29 September 2023	14:00	Bronze medal match
Friday, 29 September 2023	19:00	Final

== Seeding ==
A qualification tournament called AESF Road to Asian Games 2022 was played in Macau, China from 15 to 22 June 2023. The results of this tournament were used to determine the seedings for the Games. Vietnam withdrew from the qualification tournament due to visa issues; each of their opponents were consequently given a free win.

Central & South Asia	East Asia	Southeast Asia	West Asia
India (3–0)	China (3–0)	Malaysia (4–0)	Saudi Arabia (5–0)
Kazakhstan (2–1)	Chinese Taipei (2–1)	Singapore (3–1)	Jordan (3–2)
Sri Lanka (1–2)	Hong Kong (1–2)	Thailand (2–2)	Oman (3–2)
Kyrgyzstan (0–3)	Macau (0–3)	Philippines (1–3)	Kuwait (3–2)
		Vietnam (0–4)	Palestine (1–4)
			Bahrain (0–5)

India, China, Malaysia and Saudi Arabia qualified directly to the quarterfinal stage.

== Squads ==
China	Chinese Taipei	Hong Kong	India
Chen Zebin; Zhao Lijie; Zhuo Ding; Zhao Jiahao; Tian Ye; Peng Lixun	Xu Shi-Jie; Hung Hao-hsuan; Chu Jun-lan; Chiu Tzu-chuan; Hu Shuo-chieh; Su Chia-hsiang	Wong Ka Chun; Mak Fu Keung; Chan Chi Yung; Li Ka Yuen; Ling Kai Wing; Chau Shu Tak	Sanindhya Malik; Aakash Shandilya; Akshaj Shenoy; Mihir Ranjan; Samarth Arvind Trivedi; Aditya Selvaraj
Japan	Kazakhstan	Macau	Malaysia
Minato Shinohara; Dai Takai; Norifumi Yamazaki; Yuta Sugiura; Ryosei Tanioka; Fumiya Ando	Alisher Khojayev; Chingiz Abishev; Shyngys Chokushev; Gibrat Akhmetov; Anuar Khalykbergenov	Sou Ka Fu; Yau U Son; Sit Chong Fai; Yeung Hou Leong; Leung Sze Yuen	Tam See Kheing; Ang Jing En; Lee Kaiwen; Lim Yew Siang; Alvin Lim; Lim Wei Lun
Maldives	Palestine	Saudi Arabia	South Korea
Ziyad Ahzam; Umar Thaib Hashim; Thynum Ahmed; Mohamed Zain Adam; Mohamed Naahil Naahid	Adli Arafat; Ghaleb Fatayer; Saif Aghbar; Rami Ghanayem; Yousef Shakhshir	Nawaf Al-Khowaiter; Ajwad Wazzan; Abdolaziz Al-Mubarak; Nawaf Al-Salem; Meshal Al-Barrak; Nawaf Al-Juaid	Choi Woo-je; Seo Jin-hyeok; Jung Ji-hun; Park Jae-hyeok; Ryu Min-seok; Lee Sang-hyeok
Thailand	United Arab Emirates	Vietnam	
Phumiphat Boonta; Nutthanon Bumrungchawkasem; Chirapat Eyesong; Chayutphong Sukkamart; Nut Palanan; Karun Changpu	Khalifa Al-Dhaheri; Butti Al-Mansoori; Mohamed Al-Matrooshi; Fares Al-Mazrouei; Harib Al-Mentheri; Ahmed Al-Suwaidi	Trần Duy Sang; Đỗ Duy Khánh; Đặng Thanh Phê; Trần Quốc Hưng; Trần Đức Hiếu; Lê Ngọc Vinh	

== Results ==
=== Group round ===
==== Group A ====
Pos	Team	Pld	W	L	Pts	Qualification
1	South Korea	2	2	0	2	Quarterfinals
2	Hong Kong	2	1	1	1	
3	Kazakhstan	2	0	2	0	

Source: OCA

	Score	
Hong Kong	0–1	South Korea
Hong Kong	1–0	Kazakhstan
South Korea	1–0	Kazakhstan

==== Group B ====
Pos	Team	Pld	W	L	Pts	Qualification
1	Vietnam	2	2	0	2	Quarterfinals
2	Japan	2	1	1	1	
3	Palestine	2	0	2	0	

Source: OCA

	Score	
Japan	1–0	Palestine
Japan	0–1	Vietnam
Palestine	0–1	Vietnam

==== Group C ====
Pos	Team	Pld	W	L	Pts	Qualification
1	Chinese Taipei	2	2	0	2	Quarterfinals
2	United Arab Emirates	2	1	1	1	
3	Maldives	2	0	2	0	

Source: OCA

	Score	
United Arab Emirates	0–1	Chinese Taipei
United Arab Emirates	1–0	Maldives
Chinese Taipei	1–0	Maldives

==== Group D ====
Pos	Team	Pld	W	L	Pts	Qualification
1	Macau	1	1	0	1	Quarterfinals
2	Thailand	1	0	1	0	

Source: OCA

	Score	
Thailand	0–1	Macau

=== Knockout round ===
Quarterfinals
Saudi Arabia	0
South Korea	2
Macau	0
China	2
Malaysia	0
Chinese Taipei	2
Vietnam	2
India	0

Semifinals
South Korea	2
China	0
Chinese Taipei	2
Vietnam	0

Final
South Korea	2
Chinese Taipei	0
Bronze medal match
China	2
Vietnam	1
