= 2024 LPL season =

- League: LPL
- Sport: League of Legends
- Duration: 22 January – 20 April (Spring); 1 June – 30 August (Summer)
- Teams: 17

Spring Split
- Champions: Bilibili Gaming
- Runners-up: Top Esports
- Season MVP: Zhuo "knight" Ding (Bilibili Gaming)

Summer Split
- Champions: Bilibili Gaming
- Runners-up: Weibo Gaming
- Season MVP: Gao "Tian" Tianliang (Top Esports)

LPL seasons
- ← 2023 2025 →

The 2024 LPL season was the 12th season of the League of Legends Pro League (LPL), a Chinese professional esports league for the video game League of Legends. Similar to its previous yearly splits, the 2024 LPL season will be divided into two splits: Spring and Summer. The Spring Split began on 22 January and will end on 20 April 2024 for the Grand Finals. Meanwhile, the Summer Split began on 1 June and ended with the Summer Grand Finals on 30 August.

Bilibili Gaming was crowned the 2024 Spring Champions after defeating Top Esports 3–1 in the Grand Finals rematch of the Upper Bracket Finals. This was Bilibili Gaming's first organizational title under the name Bilibili Gaming in the LPL., and both Bilibili Gaming and Top Esports qualified for the 2024 Mid-Season Invitational. Bilibili Gaming once again led the Summer regular season and won their second consecutive domestic title over Weibo Gaming in a 3–0 sweep.

Bilibili Gaming directly qualified to the 2024 World Championship by winning the Summer split, while Top Esports qualified via Championship Points. Through the regional finals, LNG Esports and Weibo Gaming also qualified, as the third and fourth LPL seeds respectively.

== Format ==
The Spring Split will have seventeen (17) competing teams during the Regular Season. Each team will participate in the single Round-robin tournament where all matches will be played in best-of-threes. Similarly to its previous seasons, the top ten (10) teams will advance to the playoff bracket with the Top 2 seeded teams advancing to the four-team Double-elimination tournament bracket while the remaining eight (8) teams will be competing in a single-elimination king-of-the hill tournament with only the top two teams from these competitions advancing to complete the four-team double elimination bracket. The champion for Spring 2024 will qualify for the 2024 Mid-Season Invitational's group stage while the runner-up will qualify for the 2024 Mid-Season Invitational's play-in stage.

The Summer split's format is split into three stages. The first stage will consist of a double round-robin group stage where all seventeen (17) teams are split into three groups of 4 and a group of 5. This first stage will implement the "Fearless Draft", a drafting format seen in China's LDL developmental league where Champions from previous games in the best-of-three series are banned from the remaining games. The top two teams in each group and the third place team in the five-team group qualify for the "ascend" group in the second stage, while the rest qualify for the "nirvana" group. The second stage will see the teams in each of the groups face each other in single round-robin regular draft competition in best-of-threes. The top two seeded teams in the ascend group advance to the four-team double elimination tournament bracket as usual, while the remaining ascend group teams and the top four nirvana group teams advance to the single-elimination, king-of-the hill tournament. The bottom two ascend group teams and the top four nirvana group teams will have to contest an additional match. As per usual, the champion for Summer 2024 will qualify for the 2024 World Championship as China's number one seed.

== Spring ==
=== Regular season ===
Spring 2024 is the second-consecutive season where the Top seed only lost one game during the entirety of the regular season. Moreover, Bilibili Gaming is the first organization thus far to go back-to-back 15-1 records in two different splits. BLG went 15–1 in the Summer Split and finished Spring 2024 with another 15–1 record.

Pos	Team	Pld	W	L	PCT	GW	GL	+/-	Qualification
1	Bilibili Gaming	16	15	1	0.938	30	5	+25	Advance to Upper Semifinals
2	Top Esports	16	13	3	0.813	29	8	+21	Advance to Upper Semifinals
3	JD Gaming	16	13	3	0.813	27	12	+15	Advance to Round 3
4	FunPlus Phoenix	16	11	5	0.688	24	16	+8	Advance to Round 3
5	Ninjas in Pyjamas	16	10	6	0.625	21	15	+6	Advance to Round 2
6	LNG Esports	16	9	7	0.563	23	18	+5	Advance to Round 2
7	Weibo Gaming	16	8	8	0.500	20	17	+3	Advance to Round 1
8	Oh My God	16	8	8	0.500	19	18	+1	Advance to Round 1
9	Team WE	16	8	8	0.500	19	19	0	Advance to Round 1
10	Invictus Gaming	16	8	8	0.500	19	20	−1	Advance to Round 1
11	Anyone's Legend	16	7	9	0.438	18	23	−5	
12	LGD Gaming	16	6	10	0.375	17	23	−6	
13	ThunderTalk Gaming	16	6	10	0.375	15	22	−7	
14	Royal Never Give Up	16	5	11	0.313	12	24	−12	
15	Rare Atom	16	4	12	0.250	10	28	−18	
16	Edward Gaming	16	3	13	0.188	11	27	−16	
17	Ultra Prime Esports	16	2	14	0.125	10	29	−19	

Source: LoL Esports

=== Playoffs ===
Defending Mid-Season Invitational champions JD Gaming was eliminated during the Lower Bracket Finals over Top Esports and will not be able to defend their title in London. However, two of their former players, 369 and knight, will defend their title when MSI comes to Chengdu. Furthermore, Bilibili Gaming will return to MSI 2024 as one of the four group-stage qualifying teams. Top Esports' defeat means their qualification to MSI 2024 will be through the Play-In stage where they are group alongside the 2023 League of Legends World Champions T1.

==== Bracket ====
Round 1
8	Oh My God	1
9	Team WE	3
7	Weibo Gaming	3
10	Invictus Gaming	2

Round 2
5	Ninjas in Pyjamas	3
9	Team WE	2
6	LNG Esports	2
7	Weibo Gaming	3

Round 3
4	FunPlus Phoenix	1
5	Ninjas in Pyjamas	3
3	JD Gaming	3
7	Weibo Gaming	0

Upper semifinals
1	Bilibili Gaming	3
5	Ninjas in Pyjamas	1
2	Top Esports	3
3	JD Gaming	0
Lower semifinal
5	Ninjas in Pyjamas	2
3	JD Gaming	3

Upper final
1	Bilibili Gaming	3
2	Top Esports	2
Lower final
2	Top Esports	3
3	JD Gaming	1

Final
1	Bilibili Gaming	3
2	Top Esports	1
