= 2023 Mid-Season Invitational =

League of Legends esports tournament

Tournament information
- Sport: League of Legends
- Location: London, England
- Dates: 2 May–21 May
- Administrator: Riot Games
- Venue: Copper Box Arena
- Teams: 13

Final positions
- Champions: JD Gaming
- Runner-up: Bilibili Gaming
- MVP: Zhuo "knight" Ding (JD Gaming)

The 2023 Mid-Season Invitational was the eighth Mid-Season Invitational (MSI), a Riot Games-organised tournament for League of Legends, a multiplayer online battle arena video game. The tournament was the culmination of the 2023 Spring Split (Note: For the 2023 season, the Winter and Spring champion from EMEA (LEC) qualified for the event, as a result of the introduction of three splits to the LEC season.) and the first interregional competition of Season 13.

The event marked the first time a double elimination format would be applied to a League of Legends esports event, as the event was split into two stages, that being the play-in stage and the bracket stage.

The tournament was hosted in London, England, from 2 to 21 May 2023. All stages of the tournament were played in the Copper Box Arena.

"Rules (Are Meant to Break)" was the tournament's theme song, put together by Che Lingo.

Royal Never Give Up from China were the two-time reigning champions, but failed to qualify for the event after losing to Bilibili Gaming in the 2023 LPL Spring Playoffs.

JD Gaming and Bilibili Gaming, both from China, faced off in the finals, with JD Gaming defeating Bilibili Gaming 3–1 and winning their first MSI title.

== Format ==
8 of the 13 teams started from the play-in stage. Three final surviving teams from the play-in stage then proceeded to the bracket stage, where they would meet with the other five teams. For the event, the teams were unable to use champions Yuumi and Milio as both were deemed unsuitable by Riot Games for competitive play at the time.

=== Play-in stage ===
All teams were drawn into two groups, with all groups having four teams. Excluding the Last Chance Qualifier (LCQ) match that was a best-of five match, all the other matches of the stage had a best-of-three double elimination format.

=== Bracket stage ===
The three surviving teams from previous stage joined the other five teams to compete in the bracket stage. All matches of the bracket stage had a best-of-five double elimination format.

== Qualified teams ==
Four of the nine premier League of Legends leagues had two teams representing them, including the LCK, LPL, LEC and LCS, with both LCK teams will start in the bracket stage due to a team from the region winning the 2022 World Championship. Team from LCL (CIS), TCL (Turkey), LCO (Oceania) have been no longer qualified directly for MSI since 2023. The number of teams taking part in this tournament would be increased from eleven to thirteen.

Region	League	Path	Team	ID	Pool
Starting in the bracket stage
South Korea	LCK	Spring champion	Gen.G	GEN	1
South Korea	LCK	Spring runner-up	T1	T1	3
China	LPL	Spring champion	JD Gaming	JDG	1
EMEA	LEC	Spring champion	MAD Lions	MAD	2
North America	LCS	Spring champion	Cloud9	C9	2
Starting in the play-in stage
China	LPL	Spring runner-up	Bilibili Gaming	BLG	1
EMEA	LEC	Winter champion	G2 Esports	G2	1
North America	LCS	Spring runner-up	Golden Guardians	GG	2
Asia-Pacific	PCS	Spring champion	PSG Talon	PSG	2
Vietnam	VCS	Spring champion	GAM Esports	GAM	3
Japan	LJL	Spring champion	DetonatioN FocusMe	DFM	3
Latin America	LLA	Spring champion	Movistar R7	R7	4
Brazil	CBLOL	Spring champion	LOUD	LLL	4

== Venue ==
London was the city chosen to host the competition. Both Play-In Stage and Bracket Stage would be held at the Copper Box Arena.

London, England
Copper Box Arena
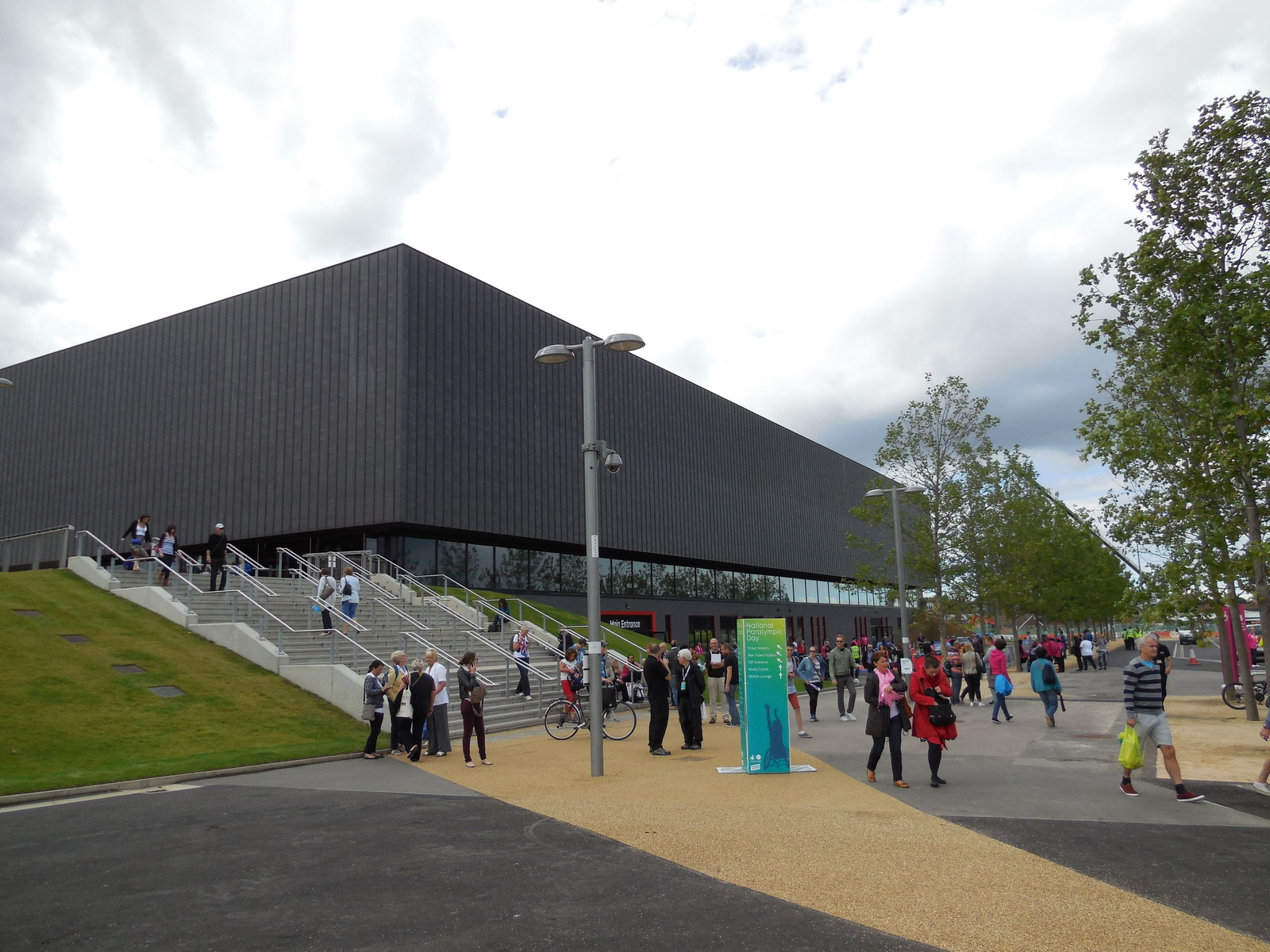

== Play-in stage ==
- Date and time: 2–7 May, begins at 13:00 GMT on weekdays and 12:00 GMT on weekends
- Eight teams would be drawn into two groups
- Pool 1 team would play with pool 4 team, while pool 2 team would play with pool 3 team in upper bracket round 1
- Double elimination; all matches are best-of-three, excluding match between two group runners-up is best-of-five
- The three teams consisting of the winners of each group and winner of match between two group runners-up advanced to the Bracket Stage as pool 3; five teams would be eliminated

=== Bracket ===
Round 1	Round 2
Match 1 – 2 May
A3	DetonatioN FocusMe	0
Match 7 – 4 May
A2	PSG Talon	2
W1	PSG Talon	0
Match 2 – 2 May
W2	G2 Esports	2
A1	G2 Esports	2
A4	LOUD	0
Match 3 – 3 May
B1	Bilibili Gaming	2
Match 8 – 4 May
B4	Movistar R7	0
W3	Bilibili Gaming	2
Match 4 – 3 May
W4	Golden Guardians	1
B3	GAM Esports	0
B2	Golden Guardians	2
Lower round 1	Lower round 2	Lower Final
Match 9 – 6 May
Match 5 – 5 May	L7	PSG Talon	2
L1	DetonatioN FocusMe	0	W5	LOUD	0	Match 11 – 7 May
L2	LOUD	2	W9	PSG Talon	0
Match 10 – 6 May	W10	Golden Guardians	3
Match 6 – 5 May	L8	Golden Guardians	2
L3	Movistar R7	2	W6	Movistar R7	0
L4	GAM Esports	1

== Bracket stage ==
- Date and time: 9–21 May, begins at 13:00 GMT on weekdays and 12:00 GMT on weekends
- Teams of same pool 1 or same pool 2 would be on opposite sides of the upper bracket. All four teams could not face each other in upper bracket round 1.
- Teams of the same region could not face each other in upper bracket round 1 too.
- Double elimination; matches are best-of-five
- The members of the winning team will lift the MSI trophy, earning their title as the League of Legends 2023 Mid-Season Invitational Champions.

Round 1	Round 2	Round 3	Finals
Match 1 – 9 May
Gen.G	3
Match 7 – 13 May
G2 Esports	1
W1	Gen.G	2
Match 2 – 10 May
W2	T1	3
MAD Lions	0
Match 11 – 18 May
T1	3
W7	T1	2
Match 3 – 11 May
W8	JD Gaming	3
Cloud9	0
Match 8 – 14 May
Bilibili Gaming	3
W3	Bilibili Gaming	0
Match 4 – 12 May
W4	JD Gaming	3
JD Gaming	3	Match 14 – 21 May
Golden Guardians	0	W11	JD Gaming	3
W13	Bilibili Gaming	1
Lower round 1	Lower round 2	Lower round 3	Lower round 4
Match 9 – 16 May
Match 5 – 13 May	L8	Bilibili Gaming	3	Match 13 – 20 May
L1	G2 Esports	3	W5	G2 Esports	1	Match 12 – 19 May	L11	T1	1
L2	MAD Lions	0	W9	Bilibili Gaming	3	W12	Bilibili Gaming	3
Match 10 – 17 May	W10	Gen.G	0
Match 6 – 14 May	L7	Gen.G	3
L3	Cloud9	3	W6	Cloud9	0
L4	Golden Guardians	1

== Ranking ==
=== Team ranking ===
Place	League	Team	Prize (%)	Prize (USD)
1st	LPL	JD Gaming	20%	$50,000
2nd	LPL	Bilibili Gaming	15%	$37,500
3rd	LCK	T1	12%	$30,000
4th	LCK	Gen.G	10%	$25,000
5th–6th	LCS	Cloud9	8%	$20,000
5th–6th	LEC	G2 Esports	8%	$20,000
7th–8th	LCS	Golden Guardians	6%	$15,000
7th–8th	LEC	MAD Lions	6%	$15,000
9th	PCS	PSG Talon	5%	$12,500
10th–11th	CBLOL	LOUD	3%	$7,500
10th–11th	LLA	Movistar R7	3%	$7,500
12th–13th	VCS	GAM Esports	2%	$5,000
12th–13th	LJL	DetonatioN FocusMe	2%	$5,000
Place	Region	Team	Prize (%)	Prize (USD)
