= Bilibili Gaming =

Chinese esports organization

- Short name: BLG
- Sport: Esports
- Founded: 17 December 2017; 8 years ago
- Based in: Hangzhou, China
- Owner: Bilibili
- Divisions: League of Legends; Overwatch; Valorant
- Affiliation: Hangzhou Spark
- Partners: Alienware; Logitech G
- Main sponsor: Ping An Bank

Bilibili Gaming (BLG) is a professional esports organisation based in China. It was formed in December 2017, when Bilibili, a Chinese video sharing website, acquired the I May League of Legends roster. The team expanded into Overwatch in March 2019 with the formation of an Overwatch Contenders academy team for the Hangzhou Spark, an Overwatch League team owned by Bilibili. Later that year, BLG's Overwatch team won the LanStory Cup 2019 Summer tournament. In 2026, the BLG League of Legends team won the 2026 League of Legends World Championship.

== League of Legends ==
=== History ===
Bilibili entered the professional League of Legends scene on 17 December 2017 with their acquisition of LPL team I May. The team was rebranded as Bilibili Gaming.

After a top two finish in the 2023 LPL Spring Split, the team qualified for MSI for the first time in their history. Bilibili Gaming won their first LPL title in Spring 2024 after winning over Top Esports, 3–1. Bilibili Gaming qualifies in back-to-back MSI series.

=== Current roster ===
Bilibili Gaming League of Legends roster
Players
Coaches

Role	Handle	Name	Nationality
Top	Bin	Chen Ze-Bin	China
Top	Flandre	Li Xuan-Jun	China
Jungle	Xun	Peng Li-Xun	China
Mid	Knight	Zhuo Ding	China
Bot	Viper	Park Do-hyeon	South Korea
Support	ON	Luo Wen-Jun	China
Top	Wenbo (I)	Yang Wen-Bo	China

Head coach

- Yang "Daeny" Dae-in

Assistant coach(es)

- Li "Chieh" Chieh
- Zhuang "zyb" Yi-Bin
- Nam "Ben" Dong-hyun

Legend:
- (I) Inactive
- (S) Suspended
- Substitute
- (injured) Injury / Illness

Roster updated 19 October 2026.

=== Seasons overview ===
Year		League of Legends Pro League					First Stand	Mid-Season Invitational	World Championship
Year		W	L	GW	GL	Finish	First Stand	Mid-Season Invitational	World Championship
2018	Spring	11	8	25	18	5th–6th	—N/a	Did not qualify	Did not qualify
2018	Summer	6	13	18	30	11th–12th	—N/a	Did not qualify	Did not qualify
2019	Spring	8	7	20	17	9th	—N/a	Did not qualify	Did not qualify
2019	Summer	11	4	23	12	4th	—N/a	Did not qualify	Did not qualify
2020	Spring	7	9	20	22	10th	—N/a	Did not qualify	Did not qualify
2020	Summer	6	10	17	22	12th	—N/a	Did not qualify	Did not qualify
2021	Spring	6	10	15	23	11th	—N/a	Did not qualify	Did not qualify
2021	Summer	10	6	24	17	7th–8th	—N/a	Did not qualify	Did not qualify
2022	Spring	9	7	25	19	7th–8th	—N/a	Did not qualify	Did not qualify
2022	Summer	7	9	19	23	9th–10th	—N/a	Did not qualify	Did not qualify
2023	Spring	10	6	25	17	2nd	—N/a	2nd	3rd–4th
2023	Summer	15	1	30	7	3rd	—N/a	2nd	3rd–4th
2024	Spring	15	1	30	5	1st	—N/a	2nd	2nd
2024	Summer	7	1	15	7	1st	—N/a	2nd	2nd
2025	Split 1	2	1	8	3	4th	Did not qualify	4th	9th–11th
2025	Split 2	12	6	28	17	2nd	Did not qualify	4th	9th–11th
2025	Split 3	10	4	22	14	1st	Did not qualify	4th	9th–11th
2026	Split 1	6	4	15	10	1st	1st	2nd	1st
2026	Split 2	12	2	24	8	1st	1st	2nd	1st
2026	Split 3	12	2	25	10	2nd	1st	2nd	1st

== Valorant ==
=== Current roster ===
Bilibili Gaming Valorant roster
Players
Coaches

Handle	Name	Nationality
whzy	Wang Haozhe	China
Levius	Lu Yinzhong	China
knight	Liu Yuxiang	China
nephh	Marcus Tan Kai Wen	Singapore
rushia	Wang Xiaojie	China

Head coach

- "bail" Lee Sung-jae

Assistant coach(es)

- "JeXen" Wang Linxiao
  "YaoXie" Zhang Jihang

Legend:
- (I) Inactive
- (S) Suspended
- Substitute
- (injured) Injury / Illness

== Overwatch ==
=== History ===
On 12 March 2019, Bilibili announced that they would field an academy team in Overwatch Contenders China under the name Bilibili Gaming for their Overwatch League team Hangzhou Spark.

BLG's first season in Contenders China was 2019 Season 1, where the team posted a 4–1 record in the group stages. The team qualified for the regional playoffs, and in their first playoff matchup, they defeated the Shanghai Dragons' academy team Team CC. They then faced the Chengdu Hunters' academy team LGE.Huya in the semifinals; BLG lost by a score of 1–3. Following their first Contenders season, BLG competed in the LanStory Cup 2019 Summer, a tournament consisting of the top ten Chinese Overwatch teams. BLG placed second in the group stages with a 3–1 record to move on to the playoffs, where they defeated The One Winner in the semifinals and LGD Gaming in the finals to claim their first tournament championship.

=== Seasons overview ===
Overwatch Contenders

Year	Season	Region	OWC regular season				Regional playoffs	Interregional events
Year	Season	Region	Finish (Note: Placements reflect standings in the team's respective group and not the entire region.)	Wins	Losses	Win %	Regional playoffs	Interregional events
2019	1	China	2nd	4	1	.800	Semifinals	Did not qualify
2019	2	China	1st	5	0	1.000	Semifinals	Did not qualify
2020	1	China	2nd	9	5	.643	Semifinals	None held
Regular season record				18	6	.750		
Playoff record				4	4	.500		

Other tournaments

- LanStory Cup 2019 Summer – 1st
