= JD Gaming =

Chinese esports organization

- Short name: JDG
- Games: League of Legends; League of Legends: Wild Rift; Valorant; Arena of Valor; PUBG; Teamfight Tactics; Mobile Legends
- Founded: April 2017
- League: LPL (League of Legends); VCT China (Valorant)
- Based in: Beijing, China
- Stadium: JDG Esports Centre
- CEO: Shao "Choice" Xiao-Hang
- Championships: 1× Mid-Season Invitational (2023); 4× LPL champion
- Parent group: JD.com

Chinese name
- Simplified Chinese: 京东电子竞技俱乐部
- Traditional Chinese: 京東電子競技俱樂部
- Literal meaning: Jingdong Esports Club
Transcriptions
Standard Mandarin
- Hanyu Pinyin: Jīngdōng Diànzǐ Jìngjì Jùlèbù

JD Gaming (JDG) is a Chinese professional esports organization based in Beijing.

It has two League of Legends teams: a main roster, officially Beijing JDG Intel Esports Club, that competes in the League of Legends Pro League (LPL), the top-level league for the game in China, and an academy roster named Joy Dream that competes in the League of Legends Developmental League (LDL), China's secondary league. Both teams were formed on 20 May 2017 after e-commerce company JD.com acquired the LPL spot of the QG Reapers and the LSPL (now LDL) spot of the esports team Now or Never.

JD Gaming is also a Valorant's franchising partner and competing in VCT China. It had an all-female League of Legends team and an Overwatch team, both of which saw only minor success and were disbanded.

== League of Legends ==
=== History ===
==== Roster Evolution and Early Competitive Endeavors (2017) ====
Most of the QG Reapers' players and staff joined JD Gaming after their organization's acquisition by JD.com on 20 May 2017. JD Gaming's first roster consisted of top laner Kan "Kabe" Ho-man, junglers Kim "Clid" Tae-min and Chang "Xinyi" Ping, mid laner Kim "Doinb" Tae-sang, bot laners Xu "Barrett" Qiubin and Lee "LokeN" Dong-wook, and supports Hu "Cloud" Zhenwei and Zuo "LvMao" Minghao. The team's first tournament was the 2017 Demacia Cup, which they placed ninth to twelfth after losing 0–2 to LGD Gaming.

JD Gaming was placed in Group B for the 2017 LPL Summer Split, placing fifth in their group with a 6–10 record. The team qualified for the 2017 National Electronic Sports Tournament (NEST) after defeating Edward Gaming 2–0 in the qualifiers. JD Gaming was able to make it to the NEST finals, where they lost 0–2 to Invictus Gaming. Following NEST, JD Gaming underwent several roster changes: Kabe, Xinyi, Doinb, Barrett, and Cloud left the team, while top laner Zhang "Zoom" Xingran and mid laner Zeng "YaGao" Qo joined to replace the vacant positions. The newly revised roster of Zoom, Clid, YaGao, LokeN, and LvMao placed fourth in the 2017 Demacia Championship after losing 0–2 to Invictus Gaming once again.

During the 2018 LPL Spring Split, JD Gaming was a member of the league's eastern conference, where they placed fourth with a 10–9 record. This placement qualified them for playoffs, where they placed seventh to eighth overall after losing 0–3 to Bilibili Gaming. JD Gaming placed third in the 2018 LPL Summer Split eastern conference with a 13–6 record and qualified for playoffs, where they placed third again after defeating Rogue Warriors 3–0 in the third place match. The team was unable to qualify for the 2018 World Championship after Edward Gaming knocked them out of the 2018 LPL Regional Finals with a close 3–2 victory. JD Gaming took first place at NEST 2018 after defeating Topsports Gaming 2–1 in the finals.

Clid and LokeN left JD Gaming during the offseason on 20 November 2018. In December 2018, junglers Sung "Flawless" Yeon-jun and Đỗ "Levi" Duy Khánh were acquired from Rogue Warriors and 100 Thieves respectively, while bot laners Ju "Bvoy" Yeong-hoon and Gu "Imp" Seung-bin joined from Young Miracles and Team WE respectively to complete the roster. The new roster placed seventh to eighth in the 2018 Demacia Cup.

JD Gaming placed eighth in the regular season of the 2019 LPL Spring Split, barely qualifying for playoffs as the last seed. The team went on to exceed many analysts' expectations by making it to the grand finals after taking upset victories over Team WE, Royal Never Give Up, and FunPlus Phoenix, who were fifth, fourth, and first respectively in the regular season. However, JD Gaming was ultimately swept 3–0 by Invictus Gaming in the grand finals.

It was announced on 13 May 2019 that Levi and Bvoy had left JD Gaming, with the former returning to his former team, GAM Esports. On 23 May 2019, jungler Seo "Kanavi" Jin-hyeok joined JD Gaming from Griffin.

JD Gaming placed tenth in the regular season of the 2019 LPL Summer Split, missing playoffs. The team was unable to qualify for the 2019 World Championship after narrowly losing to Invictus Gaming in the first round of the regional finals. Imp retired and left JD Gaming at the end of 2019, and was replaced with former Top Esports bot laner Lee "LokeN" Dong-wook. With this new roster, JD Gaming took third place at the 2019 Demacia Cup, defeating Vici Gaming in the third-place match.

JD Gaming did not make any additional roster changes going into the 2020 LPL Spring Split, and finished second in the regular season. This placement gave JD Gaming a bye to the semifinals, where they swept defending world champions FunPlus Phoenix in an upset result. JD Gaming then defeated Top Esports in a close series at the grand finals, earning their first LPL title.

==== 2022–2023 ====
JD Gaming defeated Top Esports 3–2 in the 2022 LPL Summer finals to take the league's first seed for the 2022 World Championship. At the World Championship, the team reached the semifinals, where they lost 1–3 to T1. In May 2023, JD Gaming won the 2023 Mid-Season Invitational, defeating Bilibili Gaming 3–1 in the final; mid laner Zhuo "Knight" Ding was named finals most valuable player.

==== 2024–2026 ====
Following a disappointing 2024 season, JD Gaming rebuilt its roster in December 2024, signing ADC Kim "Peyz" Su-hwan from Gen.G in a swap that sent Park "Ruler" Jae-hyuk the other way, and adding top laner Ale, while Kanavi, Yagao and Flandre left the team. In July 2025, with Ming "Clearlove" Kai newly arrived as head coach, the team replaced top laner Ale and support Missing with Xu "Xiaoxu" Xing-zu and Zhang "Wink" Rui ahead of the third split of the season.

Ahead of the 2026 season, the team signed jungler Yu "JunJia" Chun-chia and mid laner Tsai "HongQ" Ming-hong from CTBC Flying Oyster and support Zhao "Vampire" Zhe-can, with Wong "Tabe" Pak Kan as head coach, while Peng "Xun" Li-xun returned to Bilibili Gaming and Lee "Scout" Ye-chan joined Nongshim RedForce.

== Current roster ==
JD Gaming League of Legends roster
Players
Coaches

Role	Handle	Name	Nationality
Top	Xiaoxu	Xu Xing-zu	China
Jungle	JunJia	Yu Chun-chia	Taiwan
Mid	HongQ	Tsai Ming-hong	Taiwan
Bot	GALA	Chen Wei	China
Support	Vampire	Zhao Zhe-can	China

Head coach

Wong "Tabe" Pak Kan

Legend:
- (I) Inactive
- (S) Suspended
- Substitute
- (injured) Injury / Illness

Roster updated 7 October 2026.

== Tournament results ==
Placement	Event	Final result (W–L)
9th–12th	2017 Demacia Cup	0–2 (against LGD Gaming)
5th	2017 LPL Summer Split (Group B)	6–10
Qualified	NEST 2017 Qualifiers	2–0 (against Edward Gaming)
2nd	NEST 2017	0–2 (against Invictus Gaming)
4th	2017 Demacia Championship	0–2 (against Invictus Gaming)
4th	2018 LPL Spring Split (East)	10–9
7th–8th	2018 LPL Spring Playoffs	0–3 (against Bilibili Gaming)
3rd	2018 LPL Summer Split (East)	13–6
3rd	2018 LPL Summer Playoffs	3–0 (against Rogue Warriors)
3rd	2018 LPL Regional Finals	2–3 (against Edward Gaming)
1st	NEST 2018	2–1 (against Topsports Gaming)
7th–8th	2018 Demacia Cup	1–2 (against Edward Gaming)
8th	2019 LPL Spring Split	9–6
2nd	2019 LPL Spring Playoffs	0–3 (against Invictus Gaming)
5th–8th	NEST 2019	1–2 (against Invictus Gaming)
2nd	Rift Rivals 2019 LCK-LPL-LMS-VCS	1–3 (against LCK)
10th	2019 LPL Summer Split	6–9
3rd	2019 LPL Regional Finals	2–3 (against Invictus Gaming)
3rd	2019 Demacia Cup	3–0 (against Vici Gaming)
1st	2020 LPL Scrims League	3–0
2nd	2020 LPL Spring Split	12–4
1st	2020 LPL Spring Playoffs	3–2 (against Top Esports)
1st	2020 LPL Summer Split	13–3
2nd	2020 LPL Summer Playoffs	2–3 (against Top Esports)
5th–8th	2020 World Championship	1–3 (against Suning)
3rd–4th	2020 Demacia Cup	2–3 (against Team WE)
4th	2021 LPL Spring Split	12–4
5th–6th	2021 LPL Spring Playoffs	1–3 (against FunPlus Phoenix)
12th	2021 LPL Summer Split	7–9
5th–15th	NEST 2021	2–4
21st–24th	2021 Demacia Cup	0–4
3rd	2022 LPL Spring Split	11–5
4th	2022 LPL Spring Playoffs	1–3 (against Victory Five)
2nd	2022 LPL Summer Split	14–2
1st	2022 LPL Summer Playoffs	3–2 (against Top Esports)
3rd–4th	2022 World Championship	1–3 (against T1)
9th–14th	NEST 2022	2–4
5th–8th	2022 Demacia Cup	0–3 (against TT)
1st	2023 LPL Spring Split	13–3
1st	2023 LPL Spring Playoffs	3–1 (against Bilibili Gaming)
1st	2023 Mid-Season Invitational	3–1 (against Bilibili Gaming)
2nd	2023 LPL Summer Split	14–2
1st	2023 LPL Summer Playoffs	3–2 (against LNG Esports)
3rd–4th	2023 World Championship	3–1 (against T1)

== Valorant ==
=== Current roster ===
JD Gaming Valorant roster
Players
Coaches

Handle	Name	Nationality
jkuro	Yeung Ho-chung	Hong Kong
stew	Park Young-chan	South Korea
Link7	Chen Yu-han	Taiwan
Z1yan	Yang Bowan	China
Babyblue	Geng Haoran	China
riyabtw	Freddie Liu Cho-ming	Hong Kong
kklin	Zhang Zilin	China

Head coach

Yang "Ego" Haozun

Assistant coach(es)

Ashton Thomas "Wendler" Wendler

Legend:
- (I) Inactive
- (S) Suspended
- Substitute
- (injured) Injury / Illness
